= 2019 MPBL finals =

Championship series of the Maharlika Pilipinas Basketball League's 2018–19 season

| Team | Coach | Wins |
|---|---|---|
| San Juan Knights | Randy Alcantara | 3 |
| Davao Occidental Tigers | Don Dulay | 2 |
- Dates: April 11–25, 2019
- MVP: Mike Ayonayon
- Northern finals: San Juan def. Manila, 2–1
- Southern finals: Davao Occidental def. Batangas City, 2–1

The 2019 MPBL finals, also known as the MPBL Datu Cup finals, was the championship series of the Maharlika Pilipinas Basketball League's (MPBL) 2018–19 season and the conclusion of the season's playoffs. The North Division champion San Juan Knights defeated the South Division champion Davao Occidental Tigers, 3–2, as they were crowned the league's second champions. Mike Ayonayon is also named the season's Finals MVP. This finals matchup would go on to ignite a rivalry between the two teams.

Both the first-seeded Davao Occidental and third-seeded San Juan held the same regular season record (20–5), but the former held homecourt advantage as they beat San Juan in their regular season match-up. It is the first of back-to-back finals between the two teams.

== Background ==
=== San Juan Knights ===
The San Juan Knights entered the season as heavy favorites to win the national championship, as they are loaded with a mix of ex-pro players, collegiate players and homegrown players. They finished the regular season with a 20–5 win–loss record, tying with the Manila Stars for third place as both teams had an identical record. The Knights were able to clinch the third seed as they defeated the Stars in the eliminations. In the first two rounds of the playoffs, The Knights easily dealt the Navotas Clutch and the Quezon City Capitals both in just two games each series. The division finals saw their sister team, Manila Stars battling them for the Northern Division title. The series went to a decider, where the team would eventually defeat the Stars in Game 3 to clinch North Division title and move to their first ever MPBL finals appearance.

=== Davao Occidental Tigers ===
Davao Occidental Tigers came in to the tournament as the 2018 Preseason Champions winning over the Manila Stars in the finals. The Tigers ended their regular season with 20–5 win–loss record, to become the top seed in the South Division and clinch homecourt advantage for the division playoffs. They easily defeated the Cebu City Sharks and the Bacoor City Strikers in the first round and in the division semifinals, both sweeping in two games each series. In the division finals, they faced the defending champions Batangas City Athletics but were pushed to the limits, even forcing a Game 3 decider before escaping the Athletics, to claim its division title and advance to its first ever MPBL finals appearance.

== Road to the finals ==
| San Juan Knights (Northern Division Champion) | | Davao Occidental Tigers (Southern Division Champion) |
|---|---|---|
| Pos / Team / Pld / W / L / PCT / GB / Qualification; 1 / Bataan Risers / 25 / 23 / 2 / .920 / — / Playoffs; 2 / Makati Super Crunch / 25 / 21 / 4 / .840 / 2 / Playoffs; 3 / San Juan Knights / 25 / 20 / 5 / .800 (Note: San Juan wins tiebreaker over Manila by head-to-head victory.) / 3 / Playoffs; 4 / Manila Stars / 25 / 20 / 5 / .800 / 3 / Playoffs; 5 / Bulacan Kuyas / 25 / 14 / 11 / .560 / 9 / Playoffs; 6 / Navotas Clutch / 25 / 12 / 13 / .480 (Note: Navotas wins tiebreaker over Quezon City by head-to-head victory.) / 11 / Playoffs; 7 / Quezon City Capitals / 25 / 12 / 13 / .480 / 11 / Playoffs; 8 / Caloocan Supremos / 25 / 11 / 14 / .440 (Note: Caloocan wins tiebreaker over Pampanga by head-to-head victory.) / 12 / Playoffs; 9 / Pampanga Lanterns / 25 / 11 / 14 / .440 / 12; 10 / Valenzuela Classic / 25 / 10 / 15 / .400 / 13; 11 / Mandaluyong El Tigre / 25 / 8 / 17 / .320 (Note: Mandaluyong wins tiebreaker over Pasay by head-to-head victory.) / 15; 12 / Pasay Voyagers / 25 / 8 / 17 / .320 / 15; 13 / Pasig Pirates / 25 / 4 / 21 / .160 / 19; Source: Standings; Notes: 3rd seed in the North, 4th best league record | Regular season | Pos / Team / Pld / W / L / PCT / GB / Qualification; 1 / Davao Occidental Tigers / 25 / 20 / 5 / .800 / — / Playoffs; 2 / Batangas City Athletics / 25 / 15 / 10 / .600 (Note: Batangas City wins tiebreaker over Muntinlupa by head-to-head victory.) / 5 / Playoffs; 3 / Muntinlupa Cagers / 25 / 15 / 10 / .600 / 5 / Playoffs; 4 / GenSan Warriors / 25 / 14 / 11 / .560 / 6 / Playoffs; 5 / Bacoor City Strikers / 25 / 13 / 12 / .520 / 7 / Playoffs; 6 / Zamboanga Family's Brand Sardines / 25 / 12 / 13 / .480 / 8 / Playoffs; 7 / Imus Bandera / 25 / 11 / 14 / .440 (Note: Imus wins tiebreaker over Cebu City by head-to-head victory.) / 9 / Playoffs; 8 / Cebu City Sharks / 25 / 11 / 14 / .440 / 9 / Playoffs; 9 / Laguna Heroes / 25 / 10 / 15 / .400 / 10; 10 / Parañaque Patriots / 25 / 8 / 17 / .320 (Note: Parañaque wins tiebreaker over Marikina by head-to-head victory.) / 12; 11 / Marikina Shoemasters / 25 / 8 / 17 / .320 / 12; 12 / Basilan Steel / 25 / 7 / 18 / .280 (Note: Basilan wins tiebreaker over Rizal by head-to-head victory.) / 13; 13 / Rizal Crusaders / 25 / 7 / 18 / .280 / 13; Source: Standings; Notes: 1st seed in the South, 3rd best league record |
| Defeated 6th-seeded Navotas Clutch, 2–0 | First Round | Defeated 8th-seeded Cebu City Sharks, 2–0 |
| Defeated 7th-seeded Quezon City Capitals, 2–0 | Division semifinals | Defeated 5th-seeded Bacoor City Strikers, 2–0 |
| Defeated 4th-seeded Manila Stars, 2–1 | Division finals | Defeated 2nd-seeded Batangas City Athletics, 2–1 |

=== Head-to-head matchup ===
Since both teams have an identical 20–5 win–loss record, the Davao Occidental Tigers will hold the homecourt advantage for the title series as they defeated the San Juan Knights in the eliminations.

S+A
Fox Sports

December 18
09:00 pm

Boxscore

| Davao Occidental Tigers | 87–75 | San Juan Knights |
Scoring by quarter: 19–17, 21–17, 24–17, 23–24
| Pts: Emman Calo 23; Rebs: Calo, Raymundo 9 each Asts: Terso, Robles 5 each | | Pts: Larry Rodriguez 14; Rebs: Larry Muyang 10; Asts: Larry Rodriguez 5 |

Rizal Memorial College Gymnasium, Davao City
Referees: Dan Marabe, Julius Tiquio, Jojo Belnas

== Series summary ==
| Game | Date | Away team | Result | Home team | Venue |
|---|---|---|---|---|---|
| 1 | April 11 | San Juan Knights | 84–74 (1–0) | Davao Occidental Tigers | Davao City Recreation Center |
| 2 | April 13 | San Juan Knights | 60–67 (1–1) | Davao Occidental Tigers | Rizal Memorial College Gym |
| 3 | April 16 | Davao Occidental Tigers | 62–67 (1–2) | San Juan Knights | Filoil Flying V Centre |
| 4 | April 22 | Davao Occidental Tigers | 77–66 (2–2) | San Juan Knights | Filoil Flying V Centre |
| 5 | April 25 | San Juan Knights | 87–86 (3–2) | Davao Occidental Tigers | Rizal Memorial College Gym |

== Game summaries ==
=== Game 1 ===
S+A
Fox Sports
iWant Sports

April 11
9:00 pm

Boxscore

| Davao Occidental Tigers | 74–84 | San Juan Knights |
Scoring by quarter: 17–25, 15–24, 24–17, 18–18
| Pts: Emman Calo 27; Rebs: Yee 8 Asts: Custodio 6 | | Pts: Wilson 21; Rebs: Wilson, Clarito 8 each Asts: Cardona 5 |
San Juan leads series, 1–0

Davao City Recreation Center, Davao City
Referees: Jovet Ocfemia, Dan Marabe, Michael Quinay

=== Game 2 ===
ABS-CBN
Fox Sports
iWant Sports

April 13
3:30 pm

| Davao Occidental Tigers | 67–60 | San Juan Knights |
Scoring by quarter: 21–13, 16–16, 16–11, 14–20
| Pts: Billy Robles 17; Rebs: Bogs Raymundo, Yee 10; Asts: Yee 5 | | Pts: Ayonayon 17; Rebs: Rodriguez 8 Asts: Wilson 4 |
Series tied, 1–1

Rizal Memorial College Gymnasium, Davao City

=== Game 3 ===
S+A
Fox Sports
iWant Sports

April 15
9:00 pm

Boxscore

| San Juan Knights | 67–62 | Davao Occidental Tigers |
Scoring by quarter: 13–20, 18–9, 20–24, 16–9
| Pts: Ayonayon 15; Rebs: Jhonard Clarito 18; Asts: Cardona, Isit 3 each | | Pts: Bogs Raymundo 15; Rebs: Yee 13; Asts: Custodio 4 |
San Juan leads series, 2–1

Filoil Flying V Centre, San Juan

=== Game 4 ===
S+A
Fox Sports
iWant Sports

April 22
9:00pm

Boxscore

| San Juan Knights | 66–77 | Davao Occidental Tigers |
Scoring by quarter: 17–12, 17–17, 19–16, 13–32
| Pts: Orlan Wamar 19; Rebs: Wilson 12; Asts: Ayonayon 5 | | Pts: Billy Robles 22; Rebs: Billy Robles 18; Asts: BIlly Robles 3 |
Series tied, 2–2

Filoil Flying V Centre, San Juan
Referees: Bert Gica, Jay Castroverde, Carol Guay

=== Game 5 ===
S+A
Fox Sports
iWant Sports

April 25
9:00 pm

Boxscore

| Davao Occidental Tigers | 86–87 | San Juan Knights |
Scoring by quarter: 15–21, 20–28, 33–14, 18–24
| Pts: Yee 27; Rebs: Yee 7 Asts: Robles 4 | | Pts: Ayonayon 33; Rebs: Larry Rodriguez 13; Asts: Cardona, Wamar 5 each |
San Juan wins series, 3–2

Rizal Memorial College Gymnasium, Davao City
Referees: Jay Castroverde, Michael Quinay, Carol Guay

== Broadcast notes ==
ABS-CBN Sports and ABS-CBN Regional Network Group is the official broadcaster of the Datu Cup finals that were aired via S+A, ABS-CBN and on Fox Sports Philippines.

Fox Sports Philippines provided the English-language coverage of the title series.

| Game | S+A & Fox Sports Philippines | | |
| Game | Play-by-play | Analyst | Courtside reporter |
|---|---|---|---|
| Game 1 | Martin Antonio | Christian Luanzon | Shiela Salaysay |
| Game 2 | Martin Antonio | Christian Luanzon | Shiela Salaysay |
| Game 3 | Cedelf Tupas | Rodney Santos | Sel Guevara |
| Game 4 | Martin Javier | Christian Luanzon | Nikki Viola |
| Game 5 | Cedelf Tupas | Jayvee Gayoso | Sel Guevara |

- Additional Game 5 crew:
  - Trophy presentation: Dyan Castillejo

== Prizes ==
The San Juan Knights won the P10 million pesos worth of 18-karat gold trophy, similar to that NBA's Larry O'Brien Trophy, and ball rings which will await the National Champions as per league founder Sen. Manny Pacquiao and Commissioner Kenneth Duremdes.
