= 2019 MPBL playoffs =

MPBL Datu Cup playoffs

Tournament details
- Country: Philippines
- Dates: March 12 – April 25, 2019
- Teams: 16
- Defending champions: Batangas City Athletics

Final positions
- Champions: San Juan Knights
- Runner-up: Davao Occidental Tigers
- Semifinalists: Manila Stars; Batangas City Athletics

Tournament statistics
- Matches played: 39

The 2019 MPBL playoffs, also known as the MPBL Datu Cup playoffs, was the postseason tournament of the Maharlika Pilipinas Basketball League's 2018–19 season, the league's second overall, and the first under the 16-team playoff format. The postseason tournament began on March 12, day after the end of regular season on March 11, 2019, and ended at the conclusion of the 2019 MPBL finals. The 2019 MPBL finals saw the Davao Occidental Tigers battled San Juan Knights for the national championship, with the Knights winning in five games, 3 games to 2.

== Overview ==
- The Bataan Risers entered the playoffs for the second consecutive season, and clinched the best record in the league for the first time in team history.
- The Davao Occidental Tigers entered the playoffs for the first time, and clinched the best record in the South Division for the first time in team history.
- The Batangas City Athletics, Bulacan Kuyas, Muntinlupa Cagers, Navotas Clutch, and Quezon City Capitals entered the playoffs for the second consecutive season.
- The Bacoor City Strikers, Caloocan Supremos, Cebu City Sharks, GenSan Warriors, Imus Bandera, Makati Super Crunch, Manila Stars, San Juan Knights, and Zamboanga Family's Brand Sardines entered the playoffs for the first time in team history.

== Format ==
Due to the league's expansion, the playoff was expanded to feature sixteen teams instead of eight. The top eight teams from each division advanced to the playoffs. Seeding was based on winning percentage, with tiebreaker rules applied should multiple teams have the same record. The single-elimination bracket consists of four rounds with no reseeding. The first three rounds were best-of-three series and the national finals was a best-of-five series.

During the first two rounds, two games within the same division were played in a gameday, with homecourt advantage alternating between the higher-seeded teams of each series. A traditional homecourt format was then used for the last two rounds, with the division finals using a 1-1-1 format and the national finals using a 2-2-1 format. The designated home team may not be able to play within its home locality. Should it occur, the gameday may take place elsewhere.

== Division standings ==
North Division

| Pos | Team | Pld | W | L | PCT | GB | Qualification |
|---|---|---|---|---|---|---|---|
| 1 | Bataan Risers | 25 | 23 | 2 | .920 | — | Playoffs |
| 2 | Makati Super Crunch | 25 | 21 | 4 | .840 | 2 | Playoffs |
| 3 | San Juan Knights | 25 | 20 | 5 | .800 (Note: San Juan wins tiebreaker over Manila by head-to-head victory.) | 3 | Playoffs |
| 4 | Manila Stars | 25 | 20 | 5 | .800 | 3 | Playoffs |
| 5 | Bulacan Kuyas | 25 | 14 | 11 | .560 | 9 | Playoffs |
| 6 | Navotas Clutch | 25 | 12 | 13 | .480 (Note: Navotas wins tiebreaker over Quezon City by head-to-head victory.) | 11 | Playoffs |
| 7 | Quezon City Capitals | 25 | 12 | 13 | .480 | 11 | Playoffs |
| 8 | Caloocan Supremos | 25 | 11 | 14 | .440 (Note: Caloocan wins tiebreaker over Pampanga by head-to-head victory.) | 12 | Playoffs |

Source: Standings
Notes:

South Division

| Pos | Team | Pld | W | L | PCT | GB | Qualification |
|---|---|---|---|---|---|---|---|
| 1 | Davao Occidental Tigers | 25 | 20 | 5 | .800 | — | Playoffs |
| 2 | Batangas City Athletics | 25 | 15 | 10 | .600 (Note: Batangas City wins tiebreaker over Muntinlupa by head-to-head victory.) | 5 | Playoffs |
| 3 | Muntinlupa Cagers | 25 | 15 | 10 | .600 | 5 | Playoffs |
| 4 | GenSan Warriors | 25 | 14 | 11 | .560 | 6 | Playoffs |
| 5 | Bacoor City Strikers | 25 | 13 | 12 | .520 | 7 | Playoffs |
| 6 | Zamboanga Family's Brand Sardines | 25 | 12 | 13 | .480 | 8 | Playoffs |
| 7 | Imus Bandera | 25 | 11 | 14 | .440 (Note: Imus wins tiebreaker over Cebu City by head-to-head victory.) | 9 | Playoffs |
| 8 | Cebu City Sharks | 25 | 11 | 14 | .440 | 9 | Playoffs |

Source: Standings

=== Playoff qualifying ===
On January 7, 2019, the Manila Stars clinched the first playoff berth of the season.

==== North Division ====
| Seed | Team | Record | Clinched | | |
| Seed | Team | Record | Playoff berth | Best record in division | Best record in league |
|---|---|---|---|---|---|
| 1 | Bataan Risers | 23–2 | January 17 | February 28 | February 28 |
| 2 | Makati Super Crunch | 21–4 | January 7 | — | — |
| 3 | San Juan Knights | 20–5 | January 12 | — | — |
| 4 | Manila Stars | 20–5 | January 8 | — | — |
| 5 | Bulacan Kuyas | 14–11 | February 2 | — | — |
| 6 | Navotas Clutch | 13–12 | | — | — |
| 7 | Quezon City Capitals | 12–13 | | — | — |
| 8 | Caloocan Supremos | 11–14 | | — | — |

==== South Division ====
| Seed | Team | Record | Clinched | | |
| Seed | Team | Record | Playoff berth | Best record in division | Best record in league |
|---|---|---|---|---|---|
| 1 | Davao Occidental Tigers | 20–5 | January 26 | February 9 | — |
| 2 | Batangas City Athletics | 15–10 | February 8 | — | — |
| 3 | Muntinlupa Cagers | 15–10 | January 31 | — | — |
| 4 | General Santos Warriors | 14–11 | March 4 | — | — |
| 5 | Bacoor Strikers | 13–12 | February 27 | — | — |
| 6 | Zamboanga Family's Brand Sardines | 12–13 | March 5 | — | — |
| 7 | Imus Bandera | 11–14 | March 9 | — | — |
| 8 | Cebu City Sharks | 11–14 | March 9 | — | — |

== Bracket ==
Teams in bold advanced to the next round. The numbers to the left of each team indicate the team's seeding in its division, and the numbers to the right indicate the number of games the team won in that round. Teams with home court advantage, the higher seeded team, are shown in italics.

Division quarterfinals (best-of-3) | Division semifinals (best-of-3)
N1 | **Bataan** | **2**
N8 | Caloocan | 0
N1 | Bataan | 1
N4 | **Manila** | **2**
N4 | **Manila** | **2**
N5 | Bulacan | 0
**North Division**
N2 | Makati | 0
N7 | **Quezon City** | **2**
N7 | Quezon City | 0
N3 | **San Juan** | **2**
N3 | **San Juan** | **2**
N6 | Navotas | 0
S1 | **Davao Occidental** | **2**
S8 | Cebu City | 0
S1 | **Davao Occidental** | **2**
S5 | Bacoor City | 0
S4 | General Santos | 0
S5 | **Bacoor City** | **2**
**South Division**
S2 | **Batangas City** | **2**
S7 | Imus | 1
S2 | **Batangas City** | **2**
S6 | Zamboanga | 1
S3 | Muntinlupa | 1
S6 | **Zamboanga** | **2**

Division finals (best-of-3)
N4 | Manila | 1
N3 | **San Juan** | **2**
S1 | **Davao Occidental** | **2**
S2 | Batangas City | 1

National finals (best-of-5)
N3 | **San Juan** | **3**
S1 | Davao Occidental | 2

== First round ==
=== Northern Division ===
==== (N1) Bataan Risers vs. (N8) Caloocan Supremos ====
S+A
iWant Sports

March 12
09:00 pm

Boxscore

| Bataan Risers | 91–71 | Caloocan Supremos |
Scoring by quarter: 28–9, 22–24, 30–17, 11–21
| Pts: John Byron Villarias 18; Rebs: Alfred Batino 11; Asts: Raymundo 11 | | Pts: Damian Lasco 14; Rebs: Pacquiao, Custodio 9 each Asts: Pedrosa, Labing-isa 5 each |

Bataan People's Center, Balanga, Bataan
Referees: Bert Gica, Rommel Alcoran, Mark Suba

S+A
iWant Sports

March 20
07:00 pm

Boxscore

| Caloocan Supremos | 71–83 | Bataan Risers |
Scoring by quarter: 8–20, 19–20, 22–22, 22–21
| Pts: Rene Pacquiao 14; Rebs: Sarangay, Pacquiao 9 each Asts: Vosotros 8 | | Pts: Russel Escoto 17; Rebs: Batino, Escoto 9 each Asts: Raymundo 6 |
Bataan wins series, 2–0

San Andres Sports Complex, Malate, Manila

Head-to-head matchup

S+A

November 27
07:00 pm

Boxscore

| Caloocan Supremos | 81–94 | Bataan Risers |
Scoring by quarter: 15–27, 11–20, 28–20, 27–27
| Pts: Vosotros 16; Rebs: Mark Sarangay 10; Asts: Vosotros 11 | | Pts: Raymundo 20; Rebs: Alfred Batino 7 Asts: Villarias, Raymundo 6 each |

Batangas City Coliseum, Batangas City

This is the first playoff meeting between the Bataan Risers and the Caloocan Supremos.

==== (N2) Makati Super Crunch vs. (N7) Quezon City Capitals ====
S+A
iWant Sports

March 13
09:00 pm

Boxscore

| Makati Super Crunch | 77–88 | Quezon City Capitals |
Scoring by quarter: 13–23, 23–18, 21–22, 20–25
| Pts: Cedric Ablaza 19; Rebs: Joseph Sedurifa 15; Asts: Lingganay 9 | | Pts: Jay Collado 27; Rebs: Jay Collado 7 Asts: Andrew Estrella 8 |

Ynares Sports Arena, Pasig
Referees: Jhovet Ocfemia, Michael Quinay, Jonald Belnas

S+A
Fox Sports
iWant Sports

March 18
07:00 pm

Boxscore

| Quezon City Capitals | 77–74 | Makati Super Crunch |
Scoring by quarter: 15–20, 27–15, 14–14, 21–25
| Pts: Andrew Estrella 19; Rebs: Jay Collado 11; Asts: Andrew Estrella 6 | | Pts: Ablaza, Asuncion 15 each Rebs: Jeckster Apinan 10; Asts: Lingganay 9 |
Quezon City wins series, 2–0

Filoil Flying V Centre, San Juan
Referees: Julius Tiquio, Rey Gabriel, Rommel Alcoran

Head-to-head matchup

S+A

February 25
07:00 pm

Boxscore

| Quezon City Capitals | 78–102 | Makati Super Crunch |
Scoring by quarter: 20–16, 18–31, 17–30, 23–25
| Pts: Jay Collado 15; Rebs: Ramon Mabayo 7 Asts: Hesed Gabo 6 | | Pts: John Rey Villanueva 20; Rebs: John Rey Villanueva 8 Asts: Lingganay, Apinan 4 each |

Filoil Flying V Centre, San Juan

This is the first playoff meeting between the Makati and the Quezon City.

==== (N3) San Juan Knights vs. (N6) Navotas Clutch ====
S+A
iWant Sports

March 13
07:00 pm

Boxscore

| San Juan Knights | 81–76 | Navotas Clutch |
Scoring by quarter: 23–21, 19–10, 24–23, 15–22
| Pts: Mike Ayonayon 16; Rebs: Larry Rodriguez 10; Asts: Cardona, Ayonayon 5 each | | Pts: Donald Gumaru 19; Rebs: Marlon Gomez 8 Asts: Marlon Gomez 6 |

Ynares Sports Arena, Pasig
Referees: Rey Dillena, Jay Castroverde, Dan Marabe

S+A
Fox Sports
iWant Sports

March 18
09:00 pm

Boxscore

| Navotas Clutch | 69–75 | San Juan Knights |
Scoring by quarter: 11–18, 15–17, 18–21, 25–19
| Pts: Michael Sorela 14; Rebs: Marlon Gomez 20; Asts: Gumaru, Reyes 4 each | | Pts: Wilson, Cardona 13 each Rebs: Larry Muyang 10; Asts: Cardona 5 |
San Juan wins series, 2–0

Filoil Flying V Centre, San Juan
Referees: Pablo Bracero, Rey Dellina, Bert Gica

Head-to-head matchup

S+A

September 25
07:00 pm

Boxscore

| Navotas Clutch | 74–81 | San Juan Knights |
Scoring by quarter: 17–10, 19–22, 25–18, 13–31
| Pts: Kris Porter 18; Rebs: Javelosa, Sorela 6 each Asts: Joe Trinidad 3 | | Pts: Wilson 28; Rebs: Wilson; Asts: Rodriguez, Jeruta 4 each |

Strike Gymnasium, Bacoor, Cavite

This is the first playoff meeting between the San Juan Knights and the Navotas Clutch.

==== (N4) Manila Stars vs. (N5) Bulacan Kuyas ====
S+A
iWant Sports

March 12
07:00 pm

Boxscore

| Manila Stars | 69–65 | Bulacan Kuyas |
Scoring by quarter: 19–12, 5–13, 23–22, 22–18
| Pts: Aris Dionisio 11; Rebs: Aris Dionisio 17; Asts: Chris Bitoon 5 | | Pts: Gwyne Capacio 23; Rebs: JR Taganas 16; Asts: Stephen Siruma 5 |

Bataan People's Center, Balanga, Bataan
Referees: Gerry Gabriel, Rey Gabriel, Jojo Belnas

S+A
iWant Sports

March 20
09:00 pm

Boxscore

| Bulacan Kuyas | 83–92 | Manila Stars |
Scoring by quarter: 20–22, 6–15, 32–30, 25–25
| Pts: Dela Cruz, Melano 17 each Rebs: JR Taganas 10; Asts: Stephen Siruma 9 | | Pts: Christopher Bitoon 20; Rebs: Aris Dionisio 12; Asts: Marcy Arellano 9 |
Manila wins series, 2–0

San Andres Sports Complex, Malate, Manila
Referees: Pablo Bracero, Emilio Trangia, Julius Tiquio

Head-to-head matchup

S+A

August 16
09:00 pm

Boxscore

| Manila Stars | 84–62 | Bulacan Kuyas |
Scoring by quarter: 26–4, 20–20, 20–19, 18–19
| Pts: Cervantes 19; Rebs: Maclean Sabellina 11; Asts: Roger Yap 8 | | Pts: Hernal Escosio 12; Rebs: Escosio, Babilonia 5 each Asts: JR Taganas 8 |

San Andres Sports Complex, Malate, Manila

This is the first playoff meeting between Kuyas and Stars.

=== Southern Division ===
==== (S1) Davao Occidental Tigers vs. (S8) Cebu City Sharks ====
S+A
iWant Sports

March 14
09:00 pm

Boxscore

| Davao Occidental Tigers | 82–67 | Cebu City Sharks |
Scoring by quarter: 12–18, 22–11, 27–22, 21–16
| Pts: Yee 20; Rebs: Yee 12; Asts: Custodio 5 | | Pts: Rhaffy Octobre 16; Rebs: Rhaffy Octobre 7 Asts: Enrico Llanto 4 |

Rizal Memorial College Gymnasium, Davao City
Referees: Gerry Gabriel, Jay Castroverde, Bert Gica

S+A
iWant Sports

March 16
07:00 pm

Boxscore

| Cebu City Sharks | 69–76 | Davao Occidental Tigers |
Scoring by quarter: 13–19, 23–18, 24–14, 9–25
| Pts: McAloney, Rodriguez 13 each Rebs: William McAloney 14; Asts: Rhaffy Octobre 5 | | Pts: Emman Calo 27; Rebs: Yee 19; Asts: Custodio 6 |
Davao Occidental wins series, 2–0

Lagao Gymnasium, General Santos
Referees: Jhovet Ocfemia, Jay Castroverde, Rommel Alcoran

Head-to-head matchup

S+A

August 14
07:00 pm

Boxscore

| Cebu City Sharks | 64–71 | Davao Occidental Tigers |
Scoring by quarter: 17–13, 19–18, 16–21, 12–19
| Pts: Cabahug 14; Rebs: Cesar Catli 11; Asts: John Michael Abad 6 | | Pts: Billy Robles 14; Rebs: Yee 11; Asts: Custodio 4 |

Strike Gymnasium, Bacoor, Cavite

This is the first playoff meeting between the Davao Occidental Tigers and Cebu City Sharks.

==== (S2) Batangas City Athletics vs. (S7) Imus Bandera ====
S+A

March 19
09:00 pm

Boxscore

| Batangas City Athletics | 77–69 | Imus Bandera |
Scoring by quarter: 15–20, 20–12, 23–16, 19–21
| Pts: Alvarez 16; Rebs: Jhaymo Eguilos 12; Asts: Alvarez 8 | | Pts: James Castro 15; Rebs: Raniel Diwa 6 Asts: Manansala, Bustos 4 each |

Batangas City Coliseum, Batangas City
Referees: Gerry Gabriel, Dan Marabe, Jay Castroverde

S+A

March 21
07:00 pm

Boxscore

| Imus Bandera | 75–69 | Batangas City Athletics |
Scoring by quarter: 13–21, 12–8, 24–14, 26–26
| Pts: James Castro 21; Rebs: Raniel Diwa 7 Asts: Dan Alberto 6 | | Pts: Jeff Viernes 21; Rebs: Jhaymo Eguilos 14; Asts: Three players 3 each |

Muntinlupa Sports Center, Muntinlupa
Referees: Julius Tiquio, Benjie Estroga, Jonald Belnas

S+A

March 25
09:00 pm

Boxscore

| Batangas City Athletics | 92–65 | Imus Bandera |
Scoring by quarter: 19–17, 20–13, 25–18, 28–17
| Pts: Jeff Viernes 18; Rebs: Adrian Santos 13; Asts: Moncrief Rogado 7 | | Pts: James Castro 20; Rebs: Bragais, Bustos 4 each Asts: Sarao, Melencio 4 each |
Batangas wins series, 2–1

Batangas City Coliseum, Batangas City
Referees: Pablo Bracero, Julius Tiquio, Jonald Belnas

Head-to-head matchup

S+A

January 15
09:00 pm

Boxscore

| Batangas City Athletics | 96–93 | Imus Bandera |
Scoring by quarter: 27–22, 27–18, 22–29, 20–24
| Pts: Jeff Viernes 19; Rebs: Jhaymo Eguilos 10; Asts: Alvarez 7 | | Pts: Jonathan Rivera 23; Rebs: Jonathan Rivera 10; Asts: Alberto, Castro 4 each |

Batangas State University Gymnasium, Batangas City

This is the first playoff meeting between the Batangas City Athletics and the Imus Bandera.

==== (S3) Muntinlupa Cagers vs. (S6) Zamboanga Family's Brand Sardines ====
S+A

March 19
07:00 pm

Boxscore

| Muntinlupa Cagers | 89–78 | Zamboanga Family's Brand Sardines |
Scoring by quarter: 16–13, 26–18, 21–19, 26–28
| Pts: Ryusei Koga 19; Rebs: Dhon Reverente 8 Asts: Allan Mangahas 17 | | Pts: Robin Roño 22; Rebs: Robin Roño 8 Asts: Arboleda 6 |

Batangas City Coliseum, Batangas City
Referees: Pablo Bracero, Mark Rancudo, Benjie Estroga

Allan Mangahas who earned 17 assists in the game, broke the previous record of 15 assists previously held jointly by Mikee Reyes and Bobby Ray Parks Jr. to become the league's newest record holder for most assists made in a single game.

S+A

March 21
09:00 pm

Boxscore

| Zamboanga Family's Brand Sardines | 84–73 | Muntinlupa Cagers |
Scoring by quarter: 15–15, 27–20, 19–21, 23–17
| Pts: Juntilla 26; Rebs: Arboleda 17; Asts: Arboleda 13 | | Pts: Dhon Reverente 27; Rebs: Felix Apreku 12; Asts: Mangahas, Koga 7 each |

Muntinlupa Sports Center, Muntinlupa
Referees: Jovet Ocfemia, Michael Quinay, Rommel Alcoran

S+A

March 25
07:00 pm

Boxscore

| Muntinlupa Cagers | 83–87 | Zamboanga Family's Brand Sardines |
Scoring by quarter: 21–27, 24–13, 21–27, 17–20
| Pts: Dhon Reverente 14; Rebs: Felix Apreku 12; Asts: Allan Mangahas 10 | | Pts: Joseph Nalos 19; Rebs: Arboleda 13; Asts: Joseph Nalos 10 |
Zamboanga wins series, 2–1

Batangas City Coliseum, Batangas City
Referees: Rey Gabriel, Emilio Trangia, Carol Guay

Head-to-head matchup

S+A

July 4
07:00 pm

Boxscore

| Zamboanga Valientes | 69–85 | Muntinlupa Cagers |
Scoring by quarter: 16–23, 11–23, 20–17, 22–22
| Pts: Berame, Parreño 10 each Rebs: Rino Berame 11; Asts: Reed Juntilla 3 | | Pts: Allan Mangahas 18; Rebs: Felix Apreku 12; Asts: Allan Mangahas 9 |

Marist School Gymnasium, Marikina

This is the first playoff meeting between the Muntinlupa Cagers and the Zamboanga Valientes.

==== (S4) General Santos Warriors vs. (S5) Bacoor City Strikers ====
S+A

March 14
07:00 pm

Boxscore

| General Santos Warriors | 80–90 | Bacoor City Strikers |
Scoring by quarter: 26–30, 17–14, 23–25, 14–21
| Pts: Jorem Morada 19; Rebs: Christopher Masaglang 10; Asts: Jorem Morada 8 | | Pts: Gabriel Banal 31; Rebs: Mark Montuano 9 Asts: Gabriel Banal 8 |

Rizal Memorial College Gymnasium, Davao City
Referees: Jhovet Ocfemia, Dan Marabe, Rey Dillena

S+A

March 16
09:00 pm

Boxscore

| Bacoor City Strikers | 92–78 | General Santos Warriors |
Scoring by quarter: 30–25, 25–14, 17–22, 20–17
| Pts: Gabriel Banal 19; Rebs: King Destacamento 6 Asts: Gabriel Banal 10 | | Pts: Jorem Morada 19; Rebs: Marlon Basco 8 Asts: Jorem Morada 5 |
Bacoor wins series, 2–0

Lagao Gymnasium, General Santos
Referees: Gerry Gabriel, Dan Marabe, Bert Gica

Head-to-head matchup

S+A

March 4
09:00 pm

Boxscore

| Bacoor City Strikers | 71–82 | General Santos Warriors |
Scoring by quarter: 19–22, 21–20, 15–19, 16–21
| Pts: King Destacamento 16; Rebs: Gabriel Banal 14; Asts: Rocky Acidre 7 | | Pts: John Orbeta 23; Rebs: John Orbeta 11; Asts: Leomer Losentes 5 |

Strike Gymnasium, Bacoor, Cavite

This is the first playoff meeting between Bacoor City Strikers and the General Santos Warriors.

== Divisional semifinals ==
=== Northern Division semifinals ===
==== (N1) Bataan Risers vs. (N4) Manila Stars ====
S+A

March 26
09:00 pm

Boxscore

| Bataan Risers | 73–72 | Manila Stars |
Scoring by quarter: 25–19, 16–13, 24–15, 8–25
| Pts: Raymundo 12; Rebs: Alfred Batino 10; Asts: Three players 3 each | | Pts: Aris Dionisio 21; Rebs: Aris Dionisio 12; Asts: Bitoon, Arellano 5 each |

Bataan People's Center, Balanga, Bataan
Referees: Julius Tiquio, Benjie Estroga, Emilio Trangia

S+A

March 28
07:00 pm

Boxscore

| Manila Stars | 80–76 | Bataan Risers |
Scoring by quarter: 25–16, 15–17, 17–22, 23–21
| Pts: Aris Dionisio 23; Rebs: Marcy Arellano 10; Asts: Marcy Arellano 10 | | Pts: Gabriel Dagangon 28; Rebs: Gabriel Dagangon 10; Asts: Yvan Ludovice 5 |

Filoil Flying V Centre, San Juan
Referees: Pablo Bracero, Jay Castroverde, Rey Gabriel

S+A

April 1
07:00 pm

Boxscore

| Bataan Risers | 51–56 | Manila Stars |
Scoring by quarter: 11–12, 17–9, 11–17, 12–18
| Pts: John Villarias 12; Rebs: Alfred Batino 12; Asts: Three players 3 each | | Pts: Cervantes 20; Rebs: Marvin Hayes 16; Asts: Aris Dionisio 5 |
Manila wins series, 2–1

Bataan People's Center, Balanga, Bataan
Referees: Pablo Bracero, Michael Quinay, Emilio Tranguia

Head-to-head matchup

S+A

June 16, 2018
09:00 pm

Boxscore

| Manila Stars | 89–82 | Bataan Risers |
Scoring by quarter: 19–20, 23–22, 27–22, 20–18
| Pts: Aris Dionisio 21; Rebs: Aris Dionisio 7 Asts: Roger Yap 11 | | Pts: John Villarias 17; Rebs: Alfred Batino 14; Asts: Raymundo 4 |

San Andres Sports Complex, Malate, Manila

This is the first playoff meeting between the Manila Stars and the Bataan Risers.

==== (S7) Quezon City Capitals vs. (S3) San Juan Knights ====
S+A

March 26
07:00 pm

Boxscore

| Quezon City Capitals | 86–94 | San Juan Knights |
Scoring by quarter: 21–27, 18–22, 17–20, 30–25
| Pts: Hesed Gabo 21; Rebs: Three players 7 each Asts: Three players 3 each | | Pts: Cardona 25; Rebs: Larry Rodriguez 13; Asts: Cardona 9 |

Bataan People's Center, Balanga, Bataan
Referees: Rey Dillena, Dan Marabe, Bert Gica

S+A

March 28
09:00 pm

Boxscore

| San Juan Knights | 106–81 | Quezon City Capitals |
Scoring by quarter: 22–21, 21–23, 34–22, 29–15
| Pts: Cardona 26; Rebs: Larry Rodriguez 10; Asts: Cardona 8 | | Pts: Andrew Estrella 14; Rebs: Ramon Mabayo 8 Asts: Andrew Estrella 7 |
San Juan wins series, 2–0

Filoil Flying V Centre, San Juan
Referees: Julius Tiquio, Romil Alcoran, Emilio Tranguia

Head-to-head matchup

S+A

February 11
09:00 pm

Boxscore

| San Juan Knights | 68–50 | Quezon City Capitals |
Scoring by quarter: 17–13, 19–8, 14–10, 18–19
| Pts: Wilson 13; Rebs: Larry Muyang 9 Asts: CJ Isit 5 | | Pts: Kim Medina 11; Rebs: Ramon Mabayo 11; Asts: Jomar Santos 4 |

Filoil Flying V Centre, San Juan

This is the first playoff meeting between San Juan Knights and Quezon City Capitals.

=== Southern Division semifinals ===
==== (S1) Davao Occidental Tigers vs. (S5) Bacoor City Strikers ====
S+A

March 27
09:00 pm

Boxscore

| Davao Occidental Tigers | 79–71 | Bacoor City Strikers |
Scoring by quarter: 13–16, 18–19, 26–27, 22–9
| Pts: Mark Yee 21; Rebs: Mark Yee 13; Asts: Custodio 6 | | Pts: Gabriel Banal 32; Rebs: Gabriel Banal 7 Asts: Gabriel Banal 9 |

Rizal Memorial College Gymnasium, Davao City
Referees: Julius Tiquio, Jhovet Ocfemia, Michael Quinay

S+A

March 30
07:00 pm

Boxscore

| Bacoor City Strikers | 67–87 | Davao Occidental Tigers |
Scoring by quarter: 20–19, 20–21, 17–27, 10–20
| Pts: Gabriel Banal 17; Rebs: Gabriel Banal 7 Asts: Rocky Acidre 7 | | Pts: Calo, Terso 14 each Rebs: Yee 11; Asts: Yee, Robles 6 each |
Davao Occidental wins series, 2–0

Batangas City Coliseum, Batangas City
Referees: Dan Marabe, Rey Dellina, Rey Gabriel

Head-to-head matchup

S+A

December 13
09:00 pm

Boxscore

| Bacoor City Strikers | 50–69 | Davao Occidental Tigers |
Scoring by quarter: 16–23, 8–10, 13–18, 13–18
| Pts: Gabriel Banal 11; Rebs: Leo de Vera 7 Asts: 5 players tied at 2 each | | Pts: Yee 17; Rebs: Yee 11; Asts: Yee, Custodio 5 each |

Strike Gymnasium, Bacoor, Cavite

This is the first playoff meeting between the Bacoor City Strikers and the Davao Occidental Tigers.

==== (S2) Batangas City Athletics vs. (S6) Zamboanga Family's Brand Sardines ====
S+A

March 27
07:00 pm

Boxscore

| Batangas City Athletics | 58–72 | Zamboanga Family's Brand Sardines |
Scoring by quarter: 17–10, 17–16, 10–29, 14–17
| Pts: Jeff Viernes 23; Rebs: Jhaymo Eguilos 14; Asts: Mark Olayon 5 | | Pts: Roño, Juntilla 19 each Rebs: Arboleda 15; Asts: Robin Roño 6 |

Rizal Memorial College Gymnasium, Davao City
Referees: Rey Gabriel, Pablo Bracero, Carol Guay

S+A

March 30
09:00 pm

Boxscore

| Zamboanga Family's Brand Sardines | 57–67 | Batangas City Athletics |
Scoring by quarter: 18–12, 11–20, 14–16, 14–19
| Pts: Robin Roño 16; Rebs: Arboleda 10; Asts: Arboleda 10 | | Pts: Jeff Viernes 16; Rebs: Jhaymo Eguilos 10; Asts: Jeff Viernes 8 |

Batangas City Coliseum, Batangas City
Referees: Jay Castroverde, Jovet Ocfemia, Romil Alcoran

S+A

April 2
07:00 pm

| Batangas City Athletics | 80–72 | Zamboanga Family's Brand Sardines |
Scoring by quarter: 22–14, 19–18, 19–20, 20–20
| Pts: Acuña 17; Rebs: Adrian Santos 9 Asts: Jeff Viernes 9 | | Pts: Arboleda 17; Rebs: Juntilla 7 Asts: Joseph Nalos 9 |
Batangas wins series, 2–1

Batangas City Coliseum, Batangas City

Head-to-head matchup

S+A

November 27, 2018
09:00 pm

Boxscore

| Batangas City Athletics | 104–93 | Zamboanga Valientes |
Scoring by quarter: 33–25, 18–20, 28–21, 25–27
| Pts: Jeff Viernes 26; Rebs: Villamor, Viernes 8 each Asts: Jeff Viernes 11 | | Pts: Juntilla 18; Rebs: Berame, de Leon 6 each Asts: Joemari Lacastesantos 7 |

Batangas City Coliseum, Batangas City

This is the first playoff meeting between the Zamboanga Valientes and the Batangas City Athletics.

== Divisional finals ==
=== Northern Division finals: (N4) Manila Stars vs. (N3) San Juan Knights ===
S+A
Fox Sports

April 4
09:00 pm

Boxscore

| Manila Stars | 91–88 | San Juan Knights |
Scoring by quarter: 22–23, 20–21, 27–27, 22–17
| Pts: Aris Dionisio 18; Rebs: Aris Dionisio 11; Asts: Aris Dionisio 7 | | Pts: Wilson 19; Rebs: Wilson, Larry Muyang 8 each Asts: Wilson 6 |

Filoil Flying V Centre, San Juan
Referees: Jonald Belnas, Michael Quinay, Emilio Trangia

S+A
Fox Sports

April 6
07:00 pm

Boxscore

| San Juan Knights | 92–90 | Manila Stars |
Scoring by quarter: 14–18, 30–19, 24–31, 24–22
| Pts: Wilson 18; Rebs: Larry Rodriguez 8 Asts: Aaron Jeruta 7 | | Pts: Aris Dionisio 28; Rebs: Aris Dionisio 14; Asts: Marcy Arellano 10 |

San Andres Sports Complex, Malate, Manila
Referees: Jovet Ocfemia, Ceazar Jaramillo, Rey Gabriel

S+A
Fox Sports

April 8
09:00 pm

Boxscore

| Manila Stars | 74–85 | San Juan Knights |
Scoring by quarter: 16–11, 17–22, 12–31, 29–21
| Pts: Adrian Celada 17; Rebs: Aris Dionisio 9 Asts: Marcy Arellano 5 | | Pts: Cardona 18; Rebs: Wilson 9 Asts: Wilson 5 |
San Juan wins series, 2–1

Filoil Flying V Centre, San Juan
Referees: Dan Marabe, Emilio Trangia, Carol Guay

Head-to-head matchup

S+A
Fox Sports

November 21
09:00pm

| Manila Stars | 80–84 (OT) | San Juan Knights |
Scoring by quarter: –, –, –, –

Filoil Flying V Centre, San Juan

This is the first playoff meeting between the Manila Stars and the San Juan Knights.

=== Southern Division finals: (S1) Davao Occidental Tigers vs. (S2) Batangas City Athletics ===
S+A
Fox Sports

April 4
07:00 pm

Boxscore

| Davao Occidental Tigers | 66–48 | Batangas City Athletics |
Scoring by quarter: 22–7, 18–20, 11–13, 15–6
| Pts: Custodio 13; Rebs: Custodio, Yee 9 each Asts: 4 players 3 each | | Pts: Jayson Grimaldo 13; Rebs: Jeff Viernes 8 Asts: Jeff Viernes 4 |

Davao City Recreation Center, Davao City

S+A
Fox Sports

April 6
09:00 pm

Boxscore

| Batangas City Athletics | 76–74 (OT) | Davao Occidental Tigers |
Scoring by quarter: 14–21, 22–10, 14–21, 18–16, Overtime: 8–6
| Pts: Jeff Viernes 20; Rebs: Jhaymo Eguilos 17; Asts: Jeff Viernes 9 | | Pts: Emman Calo 20; Rebs: Yee 14; Asts: Custodio 8 |

De La Salle Lipa Gymnasium, Lipa, Batangas
Referees: Gerry Gabriel, Emilio Trangia, Rey Dellina

S+A
Fox Sports

April 8
07:00 pm

Boxscore

| Davao Occidental Tigers | 66–51 | Batangas City Athletics |
Scoring by quarter: 16–4, 22–17, 10–21, 18–9
| Pts: Yee 11; Rebs: Yee 12; Asts: Billy Robles 6 | | Pts: Jeff Viernes 24; Rebs: Jhaymo Eguilos 8 Asts: Jeff Viernes 5 |
Davao Occidental wins series, 2–1

Davao City Recreation Center, Davao City
Referees: Pablo Bracero, Jay Castroverde, Michael Quinay

Head-to-head matchup

S+A
Fox Sports

February 9
09:00 pm

| Davao Occidental Tigers | 71–70 | Batangas City Athletics |
Scoring by quarter: 19–19, 31–39, 55–56, 70–71

Batangas City Coliseum

This is the first playoff meeting between Davao Occidental Tigers and Batangas City Athletics.

== MPBL finals: (S1) Davao Occidental Tigers vs. (N3) San Juan Knights ==
The San Juan Knights and the Davao Occidental Tigers will battle for the national championship to become the first ever Datu Cup Champion and the second MPBL Champions.

S+A
Fox Sports
iWant Sports

April 11
9:00 pm

Boxscore

| Davao Occidental Tigers | 74–84 | San Juan Knights |
Scoring by quarter: 17–25, 15–24, 24–17, 18–18
| Pts: Emman Calo 27; Rebs: Yee 8 Asts: Custodio 6 | | Pts: Wilson 21; Rebs: Wilson, Clarito 8 each Asts: Cardona 5 |
San Juan leads series, 1–0

Davao City Recreation Center, Davao City
Referees: Jovet Ocfemia, Dan Marabe, Michael Quinay

ABS-CBN
Fox Sports
iWant Sports

April 13
3:30 pm

| Davao Occidental Tigers | 67–60 | San Juan Knights |
Scoring by quarter: 21–13, 16–16, 16–11, 14–20
| Pts: Billy Robles 17; Rebs: Bogs Raymundo, Yee 10; Asts: Yee 5 | | Pts: Ayonayon 17; Rebs: Rodriguez 8 Asts: Wilson 4 |
Series tied, 1–1

Rizal Memorial College Gymnasium, Davao City

S+A
Fox Sports
iWant Sports

April 15
9:00 pm

Boxscore

| San Juan Knights | 67–62 | Davao Occidental Tigers |
Scoring by quarter: 13–20, 18–9, 20–24, 16–9
| Pts: Ayonayon 15; Rebs: Jhonard Clarito 18; Asts: Cardona, Isit 3 each | | Pts: Bogs Raymundo 15; Rebs: Yee 13; Asts: Custodio 4 |
San Juan leads series, 2–1

Filoil Flying V Centre, San Juan

S+A
Fox Sports
iWant Sports

April 22
9:00pm

Boxscore

| San Juan Knights | 66–77 | Davao Occidental Tigers |
Scoring by quarter: 17–12, 17–17, 19–16, 13–32
| Pts: Orlan Wamar 19; Rebs: Wilson 12; Asts: Ayonayon 5 | | Pts: Billy Robles 22; Rebs: Billy Robles 18; Asts: BIlly Robles 3 |
Series tied, 2–2

Filoil Flying V Centre, San Juan
Referees: Bert Gica, Jay Castroverde, Carol Guay

S+A
Fox Sports
iWant Sports

April 25
9:00 pm

Boxscore

| Davao Occidental Tigers | 86–87 | San Juan Knights |
Scoring by quarter: 15–21, 20–28, 33–14, 18–24
| Pts: Yee 27; Rebs: Yee 7 Asts: Robles 4 | | Pts: Ayonayon 33; Rebs: Larry Rodriguez 13; Asts: Cardona, Wamar 5 each |
San Juan wins series, 3–2

Rizal Memorial College Gymnasium, Davao City
Referees: Jay Castroverde, Michael Quinay, Carol Guay
