= 2018–19 Manila Stars season =

- Head coach: Philip Cezar

Results
- Record: 20–5 (.800)
- Place: Division: 4th (North)
- Playoff finish: Division finals (lost vs. San Juan, 1–2)

Manila Stars seasons

The 2018–19 Manila Stars season was the inaugural season of the franchise in the Maharlika Pilipinas Basketball League (MPBL).

The Stars finished the regular season with a 20–5 record, ranking fourth in the North Division. In the playoffs, Manila first swept the Bulacan Kuyas in the division quarterfinals. They were behind one game against the first-seeded Bataan Risers, but they came back to win the next two games of the division semifinals. In the division finals against the San Juan Knights, the Stars ended up in the opposite end of their division semifinals run, winning game 1 but losing the next two games, ending their hopes of making the national finals, which San Juan would go on to win.

== Regular season ==
=== Standings ===
Pos	Team	Pld	W	L	PCT	GB	Qualification
2	Makati Super Crunch	25	21	4	.840	2	Playoffs
3	San Juan Knights	25	20	5	.800 (Note: San Juan wins tiebreaker over Manila by head-to-head victory.)	3	Playoffs
4	Manila Stars	25	20	5	.800	3	Playoffs
5	Bulacan Kuyas	25	14	11	.560	9	Playoffs
6	Navotas Clutch	25	12	13	.480 (Note: Navotas wins tiebreaker over Quezon City by head-to-head victory.)	11	Playoffs

Source: Standings
Rules for classification: 1) Wins; 2a) If two teams are tied, head-to-head match-up; 2b) If three or more teams are tied, head-to-head point quotient; 3) overall point quotient; 4) coin toss.

=== Schedule ===
2018–19 Manila Stars season schedule
Game	Date	Opponent	Score	Location	Record	Recap
1	June 16	Bataan	W 89–82	San Andres Sports Complex	1–0	
2	June 28	Makati	L 98–99	Ynares Center	1–1	
3	July 11	Valenzuela	W 89–84	Filoil Flying V Centre	2–1	
4	July 24	Cebu City	W 107–76	Cuneta Astrodome	3–1	
5	August 4	Pampanga	W 100–75	Angeles University Foundation	4–1	
6	August 16	Bulacan	W 84–62	San Andres Sports Complex	5–1	
7	August 29	Pasay	W 115–85	San Andres Sports Complex	6–1	
8	September 11	Caloocan	W 95–68	Ynares Center	7–1	
9	September 19	Laguna	L 68–74	Cuneta Astrodome	7–2	
10	September 26	Mandaluyong	W 92–73	San Andres Sports Complex	8–2	
11	October 10	Muntinlupa	W 100–86	Muntinlupa Sports Center	9–2	
12	October 27	Zamboanga	W 60–59	Mayor Vitaliano D. Agan Coliseum	10–2	
13	November 6	Parañaque	W 98–88	Valenzuela Astrodome	11–2	
14	November 14	Quezon City	W 76–71	JCSGO Christian Academy	12–2	
15	November 21	San Juan	L 80–84 (OT)	Filoil Flying V Centre	12–3	
16	November 29	Basilan	W 79–67	San Andres Sports Complex	13–3	
17	December 10	General Santos	W 63–57	Bataan People's Center	14–3	
18	December 19	Batangas City	W 80–79	Batangas City Coliseum	15–3	
19	January 7	Rizal	W 71–70	Bataan People's Center	16–3	
20	January 14	Bacoor City	L 86–92	Olivarez College	16–4	
21	January 22	Pasig	W 111–98	San Andres Sports Complex	17–4	
22	February 1	Imus	W 69–68	San Andres Sports Complex	18–4	
23	February 7	Marikina	W 91–89	Muntinlupa Sports Center	19–4	
24	February 19	Navotas	L 92–96	San Andres Sports Complex	19–5	
25	February 26	Davao Occidental	W 89–88	San Andres Sports Complex	20–5	
Source: Schedule

== Playoffs ==
=== Schedule ===
2019 Manila Stars playoffs schedule
Round	Game	Date	Opponent	Score	Location	Series	Recap
Division quarterfinals	1	March 12	Bulacan	W 69–65	Bataan People's Center	1–0	
Division quarterfinals	2	March 20	Bulacan	W 92–83	San Andres Sports Complex	2–0	
Division semifinals	1	March 26	Bataan	L 72–73	Bataan People's Center	0–1	
Division semifinals	2	March 28	Bataan	W 80–76	Filoil Flying V Centre	1–1	
Division semifinals	3	April 1	Bataan	W 56–51	Bataan People's Center	2–0	
Division finals	1	April 4	San Juan	W 91–88	Filoil Flying V Centre	1–0	
Division finals	2	April 6	San Juan	L 90–92	San Andres Sports Complex	1–1	
Division finals	3	April 8	San Juan	L 74–85	Filoil Flying V Centre	1–2	
Source: Schedule
