= 2018–19 Cebu City Sharks season =

- Head coach: Gilbert Castillo; Norberto Manalili

Results
- Record: 11–14 (.440)
- Place: Division: 8th (South)
- Playoff finish: Division Quarterfinals (lost vs. Davao Occidental, 0–2)

Cebu City Sharks seasons

The 2018–19 Cebu City Sharks season was the inaugural season of the franchise in the Maharlika Pilipinas Basketball League (MPBL).

The Sharks started the season 1–8 but went on to win 10 of the next 14 games, eventually finishing the season 11–14. As the eighth seed in the South Division, Cebu City faced the Davao Occidental Tigers in the Division Quarterfinals, but would lose in two games.

The team only played two home games season, the first was on October 6 at the University of San Jose–Recoletos and the other was on November 17 at the Hoops Dome in Lapu-Lapu City.

== Regular season ==
=== Standings ===
Pos	Team	Pld	W	L	PCT	GB	Qualification
6	Zamboanga Family's Brand Sardines	25	12	13	.480	8	Playoffs
7	Imus Bandera	25	11	14	.440 (Note: Imus wins tiebreaker over Cebu City by head-to-head victory.)	9	Playoffs
8	Cebu City Sharks	25	11	14	.440	9	Playoffs
9	Laguna Heroes	25	10	15	.400	10	
10	Parañaque Patriots	25	8	17	.320 (Note: Parañaque wins tiebreaker over Marikina by head-to-head victory.)	12	

Source: Standings
Rules for classification: 1) Wins; 2a) If two teams are tied, head-to-head match-up; 2b) If three or more teams are tied, head-to-head point quotient; 3) overall point quotient; 4) coin toss.

=== Schedule ===
2018–19 Cebu City Sharks season schedule
Game	Date	Opponent	Score	Location	Record	Recap
1	June 21	Bacoor City	L 71–76	Muntinlupa Sports Complex	0–1	
2	July 3	Parañaque	L 73–81	Olivarez College	0–2	
3	July 12	Basilan	L 76–86	Strike Gymnasium	0–3	
4	July 24	Manila	L 76–107	Cuneta Astrodome	0–4	
5	August 2	Batangas City	W 72–66	Batangas City Coliseum	1–4	
6	August 14	Davao Occidental	L 64–71	Strike Gymnasium	1–5	
7	August 23	General Santos	L 66–70	Strike Gymnasium	1–6	
8	September 4	Imus	L 61–90	Imus City Sports Complex	1–7	
9	September 22	Bataan	L 69–76	Ynares Sports Arena	1–8	
10	October 6	Makati	W 70–66	University of San Jose–Recoletos	2–8	
11	October 16	Valenzuela	W 78–75	Ynares Center	3–8	
12	October 27	Marikina	W 78–74	Mayor Vitaliano D. Agan Coliseum	4–8	
13	November 3	Pasig	W 56–53	Bataan People's Center	5–8	
14	November 10	San Juan	L 62–71	Filoil Flying V Centre	5–9	
15	November 17	Laguna	W 77–75 (2OT)	Hoops Dome	6–9	
16	November 26	Rizal	L 57–80	Ynares Sports Arena	6–10	
17	December 8	Navotas	L 73–83	San Andres Sports Complex	6–11	
18	December 13	Pasay	W 76–61	Strike Gymnasium	7–11	
19	December 18	Caloocan	W 71–70	Rizal Memorial Colleges	8–11	
20	January 12	Pampanga	W 69–68	Angeles University Foundation	9–11	
21	January 19	Muntinlupa	W 80–73	Marist School	10–11	
22	January 26	Mandaluyong	L 67–75	Angeles University Foundation	10–12	
23	February 2	Bulacan	W 70–54	Angeles University Foundation	11–12	
24	February 18	Zamboanga	L 58–61	Marist School	11–13	
25	February 28	Quezon City	L 68–75	Bataan People's Center	11–14	
Source: Schedule

== Playoffs ==
=== Schedule ===
2019 Cebu City Sharks playoffs schedule
Round	Game	Date	Opponent	Score	Location	Series	Recap
Division Quarterfinals	1	March 14	Davao Occidental	L 67–82	Rizal Memorial Colleges	0–1	
Division Quarterfinals	2	March 16	Davao Occidental	L 69–76	Lagao Gymnasium	0–2	
Source: Schedule
