= 2018–19 Pasay Voyagers season =

- Head coach: Cholo Martin

Results
- Record: 8–17 (.320)
- Place: Division: 12th (North)

Pasay Voyagers seasons

The 2018–19 Pasay Voyagers season was the inaugural season of the franchise in the Maharlika Pilipinas Basketball League (MPBL).

All of their home games were played at Cuneta Astrodome.

== Regular season ==
=== Standings ===
Pos	Team	Pld	W	L	PCT	GB
9	Pampanga Lanterns	25	11	14	.440 (Note: Caloocan wins tiebreaker over Pampanga by head-to-head victory.)	12
10	Valenzuela Classic	25	10	15	.400	13
11	Mandaluyong El Tigre	25	8	17	.320 (Note: Mandaluyong wins tiebreaker over Pasay by head-to-head victory.)	15
12	Pasay Voyagers	25	8	17	.320	15
13	Pasig Pirates	25	4	21	.160	19

Source: Standings
Rules for classification: 1) Wins; 2a) If two teams are tied, head-to-head match-up; 2b) If three or more teams are tied, head-to-head point quotient; 3) overall point quotient; 4) coin toss.

=== Schedule ===
2018–19 Pasay Voyagers season schedule
Game	Date	Opponent	Score	Location	Record	Recap
1	June 16	Navotas	L 75–83	San Andres Sports Complex	0–1	
2	June 28	Rizal	W 87–81	Ynares Center	1–1	
3	July 11	San Juan	L 66–89	Filoil Flying V Centre	1–2	
4	July 24	Bacoor City	L 86–90	Cuneta Astrodome	1–3	
5	August 4	Parañaque	L 69–73	Angeles University Foundation	1–4	
6	August 16	Basilan	W 69–66	San Andres Sports Complex	2–4	
7	August 29	Manila	L 85–115	San Andres Sports Complex	2–5	
8	September 6	Batangas City	L 57–60	Cuneta Astrodome	2–6	
9	September 19	Davao Occidental	L 61–68	Cuneta Astrodome	2–7	
10	October 2	General Santos	W 70–64	Cuneta Astrodome	3–7	
11	October 10	Imus	W 79–75	Muntinlupa Sports Complex	4–7	
12	October 20	Quezon City	W 83–81	Rizal Memorial Colleges	5–7	
13	November 3	Bataan	L 60–77	Bataan People's Center	5–8	
14	November 13	Mandaluyong	W 74–70	Cuneta Astrodome	6–8	
15	November 22	Bulacan	L 70–73	Bulacan Capitol Gymnasium	6–9	
16	December 4	Pampanga	L 83–86	Strike Gymnasium	6–10	
17	December 13	Cebu City	L 61–76	Strike Gymnasium	6–11	
18	December 19	Makati	L 59–67	Batangas City Coliseum	6–12	
19	January 3	Muntinlupa	L 67–80	Alonte Sports Arena	6–13	
20	January 10	Caloocan	L 63–85	Caloocan Sports Complex	6–14	
21	January 21	Laguna	W 76–72	Cuneta Astrodome	7–14	
22	January 29	Valenzuela	L 80–93	Valenzuela Astrodome	7–15	
23	February 5	Zamboanga	L 74–91	Cuneta Astrodome	7–16	
24	February 13	Marikina	L 69–71	Cuneta Astrodome	7–17	
25	February 27	Pasig	W 84–71	Bulacan Capitol Gymnasium	8–17	
Source: Schedule
