= 2018–19 Bulacan Kuyas season =

- Head coach: Britt Reroma

Results
- Record: 14–11 (.560)
- Place: Division: 5th (North)
- Playoff finish: Division Quarterfinals (lost vs. Manila, 0–2)

Bulacan Kuyas seasons

The 2018–19 Bulacan Kuyas season was the second season of the franchise in the Maharlika Pilipinas Basketball League (MPBL).

Bulacan entered this season coming off a stunning upset loss against the Parañaque Patriots in the 2018 playoffs. After finishing as the second seed, the Kuyas only managed to place fifth with a 14–11 record, a lower win percentage compared to their previous campaign. They would then get swept by the Manila Stars in the Division Quarterfinals.

The Kuyas played most of their home games this season at Bulacan Capitol Gymnasium in Malolos. The team also played at Baliwag Star Arena in Baliwag for their first home game of the season.

== Regular season ==
=== Standings ===
Pos	Team	Pld	W	L	PCT	GB	Qualification
3	San Juan Knights	25	20	5	.800 (Note: San Juan wins tiebreaker over Manila by head-to-head victory.)	3	Playoffs
4	Manila Stars	25	20	5	.800	3	Playoffs
5	Bulacan Kuyas	25	14	11	.560	9	Playoffs
6	Navotas Clutch	25	12	13	.480 (Note: Navotas wins tiebreaker over Quezon City by head-to-head victory.)	11	Playoffs
7	Quezon City Capitals	25	12	13	.480	11	Playoffs

Source: Standings
Rules for classification: 1) Wins; 2a) If two teams are tied, head-to-head match-up; 2b) If three or more teams are tied, head-to-head point quotient; 3) overall point quotient; 4) coin toss.

=== Schedule ===
2018–19 Bulacan Kuyas season schedule
Game	Date	Opponent	Score	Location	Record	Recap
1	June 19	Rizal	W 80–61	Baliwag Star Arena	1–0	
2	June 30	San Juan	L 76–94	Valenzuela Astrodome	1–1	
3	July 12	Bacoor City	W 77–76	Strike Gymnasium	2–1	
4	July 25	Parañaque	W 77–58	Bulacan Capitol Gymnasium	3–1	
5	August 1	Davao Occidental	W 88–85 (OT)	Filoil Flying V Centre	4–1	
6	August 7	Basilan	W 59–57	Marist School	5–1	
7	August 16	Manila	L 62–84	San Andres Sports Complex	5–2	
8	August 28	Batangas City	W 63–54	Bulacan Capitol Gymnasium	6–2	
9	September 18	General Santos	L 43–56	José Rizal University	6–3	
10	September 27	Imus	W 117–113 (OT)	Bulacan Capitol Gymnasium	7–3	
11	October 9	Quezon City	W 61–55	Trinity University of Asia	8–3	
12	October 23	Bataan	L 49–63	Bataan People's Center	8–4	
13	October 30	Makati	L 94–99	Batangas City Coliseum	8–5	
14	November 12	Pampanga	W 67–65	Angeles University Foundation	9–5	
15	November 22	Pasay	W 73–70	Bulacan Capitol Gymnasium	10–5	
16	December 3	Mandaluyong	L 91–102	Ynares Sports Arena	10–6	
17	December 12	Laguna	W 87–70	Caloocan Sports Complex	11–6	
18	December 22	Zamboanga	L 72–75	Bulacan Capitol Gymnasium	11–7	
19	January 5	Navotas	L 89–98	Bulacan Capitol Gymnasium	11–8	
20	January 15	Pasig	W 102–96	Batangas State University	12–8	
21	January 24	Caloocan	W 86–82	Strike Gymnasium	13–8	
22	February 2	Cebu City	L 54–70	Angeles University Foundation	13–9	
23	February 12	Valenzuela	L 75–84	Valenzuela Astrodome	13–10	
24	February 21	Muntinlupa	L 66–86	Muntinlupa Sports Center	13–11	
25	February 27	Marikina	W 79–72	Bulacan Capitol Gymnasium	14–11	
Source: Schedule

== Playoffs ==
=== Schedule ===
2019 Bulacan Kuyas playoffs schedule
Round	Game	Date	Opponent	Score	Location	Series	Recap
Division Quarterfinals	1	March 12	Manila	L 65–69	Bataan People's Center	0–1	
Division Quarterfinals	2	March 20	Manila	L 83–92	San Andres Sports Complex	0–2	
Source: Schedule
