= 2018–19 Davao Occidental Tigers season =

- Division champions
- Head coach: Don Dulay

Results
- Record: 20–5 (.800)
- Place: Division: 1st (South)
- Playoff finish: National finals (lost vs. San Juan, 2–3)

Davao Occidental Tigers seasons

The 2018–19 Davao Occidental Tigers season was the inaugural season of the franchise in the Maharlika Pilipinas Basketball League (MPBL).

The Tigers had a slow start, beginning the season 2–3, before winning 18 of the remaining 20 games, which included a 13-game winning streak. Finishing the season 20–5, Davao Occidental finished as the top seed in the South Division. In the playoffs, they first swept both Cebu City and Bacoor City before beating the defending champion Batangas City Athletics in a three-game South Division finals series to face the San Juan Knights in the national finals. Both teams alternated wins in the series, with the Tigers winning in game 4 to force a deciding game 5. Davao Occidental's championship hopes ended after a late push by San Juan took their lead, losing the series in five games.

Most of the team's home games were played at Rizal Memorial Colleges, though three games took place at the Davao City Recreation Center and one game at the University of Southeastern Philippines.

== Regular season ==
=== Standings ===
Pos	Team	Pld	W	L	PCT	GB	Qualification
1	Davao Occidental Tigers	25	20	5	.800	—	Playoffs
2	Batangas City Athletics	25	15	10	.600 (Note: Batangas City wins tiebreaker over Muntinlupa by head-to-head victory.)	5	Playoffs
3	Muntinlupa Cagers	25	15	10	.600	5	Playoffs
4	GenSan Warriors	25	14	11	.560	6	Playoffs
5	Bacoor City Strikers	25	13	12	.520	7	Playoffs

Source: Standings
Rules for classification: 1) Wins; 2a) If two teams are tied, head-to-head match-up; 2b) If three or more teams are tied, head-to-head point quotient; 3) overall point quotient; 4) coin toss.

=== Schedule ===
2018–19 Davao Occidental Tigers season schedule
Game	Date	Opponent	Score	Location	Record	Recap
1	June 14	Imus	W 75–71	Alonte Sports Arena	1–0	
2	June 26	Quezon City	W 90–78	Pasig Sports Center	2–0	
3	July 6	Bataan	L 88–91	Navotas Sports Complex	2–1	
4	July 19	Makati	L 77–79	Alonte Sports Arena	2–2	
5	August 1	Bulacan	L 85–88 (OT)	Filoil Flying V Centre	2–3	
6	August 14	Cebu City	W 71–64	Strike Gymnasium	3–3	
7	August 25	Pampanga	W 82–77	Alonte Sports Arena	4–3	
8	August 30	Valenzuela	W 92–85	University of Southeastern Philippines	5–3	
9	September 19	Pasay	W 68–61	Cuneta Astrodome	6–3	
10	September 29	Caloocan	W 82–68	Caloocan Sports Complex	7–3	
11	October 13	Laguna	W 72–66	Marist School	8–3	
12	October 20	Mandaluyong	W 86–63	Rizal Memorial Colleges	9–3	
13	November 10	Navotas	W 72–59	Filoil Flying V Centre	10–3	
14	November 20	Zamboanga	W 93–68	Valenzuela Astrodome	11–3	
15	November 24	Basilan	W 86–61	Lamitan Capitol Gymnasium	12–3	
16	December 5	Pasig	W 88–82	Marist School	13–3	
17	December 13	Bacoor City	W 69–50	Strike Gymnasium	14–3	
18	December 18	San Juan	W 87–75	Rizal Memorial Colleges	15–3	
19	January 9	General Santos	L 83–84	Valenzuela Astrodome	15–4	
20	January 19	Marikina	W 80–68	Marist School	16–4	
21	January 29	Parañaque	W 92–82	Valenzuela Astrodome	17–4	
22	February 9	Batangas City	W 71–70	Batangas City Coliseum	18–4	
23	February 21	Rizal	W 84–74	Muntinlupa Sports Complex	19–4	
24	February 26	Manila	L 88–89	San Andres Sports Complex	19–5	
25	March 6	Muntinlupa	W 88–82	Muntinlupa Sports Complex	20–5	
Source: Schedule

== Playoffs ==
=== Schedule ===
2019 Davao Occidental Tigers playoffs schedule
Round	Game	Date	Opponent	Score	Location	Series	Recap
Division quarterfinals	1	March 14	Cebu City	W 82–67	Rizal Memorial Colleges	1–0	
Division quarterfinals	2	March 16	Cebu City	W 76–69	Lagao Gymnasium	2–0	
Division semifinals	1	March 27	Bacoor City	W 79–71	Rizal Memorial Colleges	1–0	
Division semifinals	2	March 30	Bacoor City	W 87–67	Batangas City Coliseum	2–0	
Division finals	1	April 4	Batangas City	W 66–48	Davao City Recreation Center	1–0	
Division finals	2	April 6	Batangas City	L 76–74	De La Salle Lipa	1–1	
Division finals	3	April 8	Batangas City	W 66–51	Davao City Recreation Center	2–1	
National finals	1	April 11	San Juan	L 74–84	Davao City Recreation Center	0–1	
National finals	2	April 13	San Juan	W 67–60	Rizal Memorial Colleges	1–1	
National finals	3	April 16	San Juan	L 62–67	Filoil Flying V Centre	1–2	
National finals	4	April 22	San Juan	W 77–66	Filoil Flying V Centre	2–2	
National finals	5	April 25	San Juan	L 86–87	Rizal Memorial Colleges	2–3	
Source: Schedule
