= 2018–19 Laguna Heroes season =

- Head coach: Alex Angeles; Nath Gregorio

Results
- Record: 10–15 (.400)
- Place: Division: 9th (South)

Laguna Heroes seasons

The 2018–19 Laguna Heroes season was the inaugural season of the franchise in the Maharlika Pilipinas Basketball League (MPBL).

Despite starting the season 6–4 in their first ten games, the team would only win four out of the fifteen remaining games. This resulted in the team only finishing ninth with a 10–15 record.

The team played all of their home games this season at the Alonte Sports Arena in Biñan.

== Regular season ==
=== Standings ===
Pos	Team	Pld	W	L	PCT	GB	Qualification
7	Imus Bandera	25	11	14	.440 (Note: Imus wins tiebreaker over Cebu City by head-to-head victory.)	9	Playoffs
8	Cebu City Sharks	25	11	14	.440	9	Playoffs
9	Laguna Heroes	25	10	15	.400	10	
10	Parañaque Patriots	25	8	17	.320 (Note: Parañaque wins tiebreaker over Marikina by head-to-head victory.)	12	
11	Marikina Shoemasters	25	8	17	.320	12	

Source: Standings
Rules for classification: 1) Wins; 2a) If two teams are tied, head-to-head match-up; 2b) If three or more teams are tied, head-to-head point quotient; 3) overall point quotient; 4) coin toss.

=== Schedule ===
2018–19 Laguna Heroes season schedule
Game	Date	Opponent	Score	Location	Record	Recap
1	June 14	Zamboanga	L 80–86	Alonte Sports Arena	0–1	
2	June 26	Pasig	W 83–75	Pasig Sports Center	1–1	
3	July 6	Navotas	W 74–61	Navotas Sports Complex	2–1	
4	July 19	Rizal	L 79–80	Alonte Sports Arena	2–2	
5	August 1	San Juan	L 56–81	Filoil Flying V Centre	2–3	
6	August 14	Bacoor City	L 86–91	Strike Gymnasium	2–4	
7	August 25	Parañaque	W 76–52	Alonte Sports Arena	3–4	
8	September 6	Basilan	W 80–62	Cuneta Astrodome	4–4	
9	September 19	Manila	W 74–68	Cuneta Astrodome	5–4	
10	October 2	Batangas City	W 61–54	Cuneta Astrodome	6–4	
11	October 13	Davao Occidental	L 66–72	Marist School	6–5	
12	October 18	General Santos	L 66–69	Lagao Gymnasium	6–6	
13	October 31	Mandaluyong	W 76–72	Alonte Sports Arena	7–6	
14	November 8	Imus	L 65–67	Ynares Sports Arena	7–7	
15	November 17	Cebu City	L 75–77 (2OT)	Hoops Dome	7–8	
16	November 22	Pampanga	L 58–75	Bulacan Capitol Gymnasium	7–9	
17	December 1	Muntinlupa	W 95–94	Alonte Sports Arena	8–9	
18	December 12	Bulacan	L 70–87	Caloocan Sports Complex	8–10	
19	December 20	Quezon City	L 80–85	Blue Eagle Gym	8–11	
20	January 10	Marikina	W 63–61	Caloocan Sports Complex	9–11	
21	January 21	Pasay	L 72–76	Cuneta Astrodome	9–12	
22	January 28	Bataan	L 70–77	Alonte Sports Arena	9–13	
23	February 4	Valenzuela	W 74–66	Bataan People's Center	10–13	
24	February 11	Caloocan	L 62–76	Filoil Flying V Centre	10–14	
25	February 20	Makati	L 65–76	Blue Eagle Gym	10–15	
Source: Schedule
