= 2018–19 Basilan Steel season =

- Head coach: Joseph Romarate; Jerson Cabiltes

Results
- Record: 7–18 (.280)
- Place: Division: 12th (South)

Basilan Steel seasons

The 2018–19 Basilan Steel season was the inaugural season of the franchise in the Maharlika Pilipinas Basketball League (MPBL).

The team only played one home game this season, which was their 14th game on November 24 in Lamitan Capitol Gymnasium.

== Regular season ==
=== Standings ===
| Pos | Team | Pld | W | L | PCT | GB |
|---|---|---|---|---|---|---|
| 9 | Laguna Heroes | 25 | 10 | 15 | .400 | 10 |
| 10 | Parañaque Patriots | 25 | 8 | 17 | .320 (Note: Parañaque wins tiebreaker over Marikina by head-to-head victory.) | 12 |
| 11 | Marikina Shoemasters | 25 | 8 | 17 | .320 | 12 |
| 12 | Basilan Steel | 25 | 7 | 18 | .280 (Note: Basilan wins tiebreaker over Rizal by head-to-head victory.) | 13 |
| 13 | Rizal Crusaders | 25 | 7 | 18 | .280 | 13 |

Source: Standings
Rules for classification: 1) Wins; 2a) If two teams are tied, head-to-head match-up; 2b) If three or more teams are tied, head-to-head point quotient; 3) overall point quotient; 4) coin toss.

=== Schedule ===
2018–19 Basilan Steel season schedule
| Game | Date | Opponent | Score | Location | Record | Recap |
|---|---|---|---|---|---|---|
| 1 | June 19 | Makati | L 65–77 | Baliwag Star Arena | 0–1 | |
| 2 | June 30 | Valenzuela | L 94–96 | Valenzuela Astrodome | 0–2 | |
| 3 | July 12 | Cebu City | W 86–76 | Strike Gymnasium | 1–2 | |
| 4 | July 25 | Pampanga | W 88–78 | Bulacan Capitol Gymnasium | 2–2 | |
| 5 | August 7 | Bulacan | L 57–59 | Marist School | 2–3 | |
| 6 | August 16 | Pasay | L 66–69 | San Andres Sports Complex | 2–4 | |
| 7 | August 28 | Caloocan | W 92–84 | Bulacan Capitol Gymnasium | 3–4 | |
| 8 | September 6 | Laguna | L 62–80 | Cuneta Astrodome | 3–5 | |
| 9 | September 18 | Mandaluyong | W 70–68 | José Rizal University | 4–5 | |
| 10 | September 27 | Muntinlupa | L 75–99 | Bulacan Capitol Gymnasium | 4–6 | |
| 11 | October 6 | Zamboanga | L 80–94 | University of San Jose–Recoletos | 4–7 | |
| 12 | October 25 | Pasig | L 77–102 | Strike Gymnasium | 4–8 | |
| 13 | November 12 | Bataan | L 77–108 | Angeles University Foundation | 4–9 | |
| 14 | November 24 | Davao Occidental | L 61–86 | Lamitan Capitol Gymnasium | 4–10 | |
| 15 | November 29 | Manila | L 67–79 | San Andres Sports Complex | 4–11 | |
| 16 | December 5 | Marikina | L 82–85 | Marist School | 4–12 | |
| 17 | December 14 | Parañaque | W 89–84 | Olivarez College | 5–12 | |
| 18 | January 5 | Batangas City | W 94–89 | Bulacan Capitol Gymnasium | 6–12 | |
| 19 | January 12 | San Juan | L 84–95 | Angeles University Foundation | 6–13 | |
| 20 | January 21 | General Santos | L 81–83 | Cuneta Astrodome | 6–14 | |
| 21 | January 30 | Navotas | L 97–102 | Navotas Sports Complex | 6–15 | |
| 22 | February 6 | Quezon City | L 68–74 | Navotas Sports Complex | 6–16 | |
| 23 | February 26 | Imus | L 108–113 | San Andres Sports Complex | 6–17 | |
| 24 | March 5 | Rizal | W 94–90 | Angeles University Foundation | 7–17 | |
| 25 | March 9 | Bacoor City | L 67–79 | Angeles University Foundation | 7–18 | |
Source: Schedule
