= 2018–19 Marikina Shoemasters season =

- Head coach: Elvis Tolentino

Results
- Record: 8–17 (.320)
- Place: Division: 11th (South)

Marikina Shoemasters seasons

The 2018–19 Marikina Shoemasters season was the inaugural season of the franchise in the Maharlika Pilipinas Basketball League (MPBL). The team concluded the season ranked 11th in the South Division after finishing with an 8–17 record.

The team plays all of their home games this season at Marikina. It is the only season in which the team didn't utilize the Marikina Sports Center.

== Regular season ==
=== Standings ===
Pos	Team	Pld	W	L	PCT	GB
9	Laguna Heroes	25	10	15	.400	10
10	Parañaque Patriots	25	8	17	.320 (Note: Parañaque wins tiebreaker over Marikina by head-to-head victory.)	12
11	Marikina Shoemasters	25	8	17	.320	12
12	Basilan Steel	25	7	18	.280 (Note: Basilan wins tiebreaker over Rizal by head-to-head victory.)	13
13	Rizal Crusaders	25	7	18	.280	13

Source: Standings
Rules for classification: 1) Wins; 2a) If two teams are tied, head-to-head match-up; 2b) If three or more teams are tied, head-to-head point quotient; 3) overall point quotient; 4) coin toss.

=== Schedule ===
2018–19 Marikina Shoemasters season schedule
Game	Date	Opponent	Score	Location	Record	Recap
1	June 12	General Santos	W 88–81	Smart Araneta Coliseum	1–0	
2	June 21	Muntinlupa	L 76–85	Muntinlupa Sports Complex	1–1	
3	July 4	Imus	L 71–72	Marist School	1–2	
4	July 16	Zamboanga	L 80–87	Angeles University Foundation	1–3	
5	July 26	Quezon City	W 78–74	Pasig Sports Center	2–3	
6	August 7	Pasig	W 71–67	Marist School	3–3	
7	August 29	Navotas	W 80–76	San Andres Sports Complex	4–3	
8	September 8	Makati	L 71–90	Ynares Sports Arena	4–4	
9	September 20	Rizal	L 69–75	Batangas City Coliseum	4–5	
10	October 4	Valenzuela	L 99–102 (2OT)	Valenzuela Astrodome	4–6	
11	October 13	San Juan	L 65–77	Marist School	4–7	
12	October 27	Cebu City	L 74–78	Mayor Vitaliano D. Agan Coliseum	4–8	
13	November 19	Batangas City	L 52–62	Marist School	4–9	
14	November 28	Parañaque	L 68–71	Muntinlupa Sports Complex	4–10	
15	December 5	Basilan	W 85–82	Marist School	5–10	
16	December 15	Mandaluyong	W 76–62	Lagao Gymnasium	6–10	
17	January 4	Bacoor City	W 87–85	Imus City Sports Complex	7–10	
18	January 10	Laguna	L 61–63	Caloocan Sports Complex	7–11	
19	January 19	Davao Occidental	L 68–80	Marist School	7–12	
20	January 31	Caloocan	L 91–94	Caloocan Sports Complex	7–13	
21	February 7	Manila	L 89–91	Muntinlupa Sports Complex	7–14	
22	February 13	Pasay	W 71–69	Cuneta Astrodome	8–14	
23	February 18	Bataan	L 64–81	Marist School	8–15	
24	February 27	Bulacan	L 72–79	Bulacan Capitol Gymnasium	8–16	
25	March 5	Pampanga	L 76–91	Angeles University Foundation	8–17	
Source: Schedule
