= 2018–19 Bacoor City Strikers season =

- Head coach: Jonathan Reyes; Leo Isaac

Results
- Record: 13–12 (.520)
- Place: Division: 5th (South)
- Playoff finish: Division Semifinals (lost vs. Davao Occidental, 0–2)

Bacoor City Strikers seasons

The 2018–19 Bacoor City Strikers season was the inaugural season of the franchise in the Maharlika Pilipinas Basketball League (MPBL).

The Strikers finished the season ranked fifth in the South Division under extraordinary circumstances. Due to a scoring error, their game against the Parañaque Patriots had to be replayed, which was originally a loss for Bacoor City. Parañaque didn't show up in the replay, giving Bacoor City the win. Should the original result remain, Bacoor City would place sixth instead.

Nevertheless, Bacoor City advanced to the playoffs and faced against the GenSan Warriors in the Division Quarterfinals, which the Strikers beat in two games. They would unfortunately be swept by the Davao Occidental Tigers in the Division Semifinals.

The team played all of their home games this season at the Strike Gymnasium.

== Regular season ==
=== Standings ===
| Pos | Team | Pld | W | L | PCT | GB | Qualification |
|---|---|---|---|---|---|---|---|
| 3 | Muntinlupa Cagers | 25 | 15 | 10 | .600 (Note: Batangas City wins tiebreaker over Muntinlupa by head-to-head victory.) | 5 | Playoffs |
| 4 | GenSan Warriors | 25 | 14 | 11 | .560 | 6 | Playoffs |
| 5 | Bacoor City Strikers | 25 | 13 | 12 | .520 | 7 | Playoffs |
| 6 | Zamboanga Family's Brand Sardines | 25 | 12 | 13 | .480 | 8 | Playoffs |
| 7 | Imus Bandera | 25 | 11 | 14 | .440 (Note: Imus wins tiebreaker over Cebu City by head-to-head victory.) | 9 | Playoffs |

Source: Standings
Rules for classification: 1) Wins; 2a) If two teams are tied, head-to-head match-up; 2b) If three or more teams are tied, head-to-head point quotient; 3) overall point quotient; 4) coin toss.

=== Schedule ===
2018–19 Bacoor City Strikers season schedule
| Game | Date | Opponent | Score | Location | Record | Recap |
|---|---|---|---|---|---|---|
| 1 | June 21 | Cebu City | W 76–71 | Muntinlupa Sports Complex | 1–0 | |
| 2 | July 3 | Pampanga | L 80–81 | Olivarez College | 1–1 | |
| 3 | July 12 | Bulacan | L 76–77 | Strike Gymnasium | 1–2 | |
| 4 | July 24 | Pasay | W 90–86 | Cuneta Astrodome | 2–2 | |
| 5 | August 2 | Caloocan | W 86–68 | Batangas City Coliseum | 3–2 | |
| 6 | August 14 | Laguna | W 91–86 | Strike Gymnasium | 4–2 | |
| 7 | August 23 | Mandaluyong | L 61–83 | Strike Gymnasium | 4–3 | |
| 8 | September 4 | Muntinlupa | L 83–97 | Imus City Sports Complex | 4–4 | |
| 9 | September 25 | Pasig | W 84–59 | Strike Gymnasium | 5–4 | |
| 10 | October 3 | Navotas | W 81–75 | Strike Gymnasium | 6–4 | |
| 11 | October 16 | Rizal | W 74–63 | Ynares Center | 7–4 | |
| 12 | October 25 | San Juan | L 63–74 | Strike Gymnasium | 7–5 | |
| 13 | November 6 | Valenzuela | W 88–81 | Valenzuela Astrodome | 8–5 | |
| 14 | November 26 | Makati | L 67–73 | Ynares Sports Arena | 8–6 | |
| 15 | December 4 | Bataan | L 75–84 | Strike Gymnasium | 8–7 | |
| 16 | December 13 | Davao Occidental | L 50–69 | Strike Gymnasium | 8–8 | |
| 17 | January 4 | Marikina | L 85–87 | Imus City Sports Complex | 8–9 | |
| 18 | January 14 | Manila | W 92–86 | Olivarez College | 9–9 | |
| 19 | January 24 | Quezon City | W 90–87 | Strike Gymnasium | 10–9 | |
| 20 | February 13 | Imus | W 90–79 | Cuneta Astrodome | 11–9 | |
| 21 | February 16 | Batangas City | L 62–70 | Strike Gymnasium | 11–10 | |
| 22 | February 23 | Zamboanga | L 63–72 | Mayor Vitaliano D. Agan Coliseum | 11–11 | |
| 23 | March 4 | General Santos | L 71–82 | Strike Gymnasium | 11–12 | |
| 24 | March 9 | Basilan | W 79–67 | Angeles University Foundation | 12–12 | |
| 25 | March 11 (Note: Originally played on November 15, the game originally was an 81–82 loss. Due to a scoring error, the game would have been replayed at 81–81 in overtime, but Parañaque did not show up during the replay. Thus, the win was awarded to Bacoor City by forfeit.) | Parañaque | W by forfeit | Strike Gymnasium | 13–12 | |
Source: Schedule

== Playoffs ==
=== Schedule ===
2019 Bacoor City Strikers playoffs schedule
| Round | Game | Date | Opponent | Score | Location | Series | Recap |
|---|---|---|---|---|---|---|---|
| Division Quarterfinals | 1 | March 14 | General Santos | L 90–80 | Rizal Memorial Colleges | 1–0 | |
| Division Quarterfinals | 2 | March 16 | General Santos | L 92–78 | Lagao Gymnasium | 2–0 | |
| Division Semifinals | 1 | March 27 | Davao Occidental | L 71–79 | Rizal Memorial Colleges | 0–1 | |
| Division Semifinals | 2 | March 30 | Davao Occidental | L 67–87 | Batangas City Coliseum | 0–2 | |
Source: Schedule
