= 2018–19 GenSan Warriors season =

- Head coach: Jesus Ramon Pido

Results
- Record: 14–11 (.560)
- Place: Division: 4th (South)
- Playoff finish: Division Quarterfinals (lost vs. Bacoor City, 0–2)

GenSan Warriors seasons

The 2018–19 GenSan Warriors season was the inaugural season of the franchise in the Maharlika Pilipinas Basketball League (MPBL).

The Warriors finished the regular season 14–11, enough to claim the fourth seed in the South Division. In the Division Quarterfinals, they faced against the Bacoor City Strikers. General Santos would lose to Bacoor City in two games.

The team played all of their home games this season at Lagao Gymnasium.

== Regular season ==
=== Standings ===
Pos	Team	Pld	W	L	PCT	GB	Qualification
2	Batangas City Athletics	25	15	10	.600 (Note: Batangas City wins tiebreaker over Muntinlupa by head-to-head victory.)	5	Playoffs
3	Muntinlupa Cagers	25	15	10	.600	5	Playoffs
4	GenSan Warriors	25	14	11	.560	6	Playoffs
5	Bacoor City Strikers	25	13	12	.520	7	Playoffs
6	Zamboanga Family's Brand Sardines	25	12	13	.480	8	Playoffs

Source: Standings
Rules for classification: 1) Wins; 2a) If two teams are tied, head-to-head match-up; 2b) If three or more teams are tied, head-to-head point quotient; 3) overall point quotient; 4) coin toss.

=== Schedule ===
2018–19 GenSan Warriors season schedule
Game	Date	Opponent	Score	Location	Record	Recap
1	June 12	Marikina	L 81–88	Smart Araneta Coliseum	0–1	
2	June 23	Imus	W 79–73	Imus City Sports Complex	1–1	
3	July 5	Quezon City	L 72–77	Blue Eagle Gym	1–2	
4	July 18	Bataan	L 58–62	Bataan People's Center	1–3	
5	July 31	Makati	L 71–86	Ynares Center	1–4	
6	August 23	Cebu City	W 70–66	Strike Gymnasium	2–4	
7	September 1	Pampanga	W 72–64	Lagao Gymnasium	3–4	
8	September 18	Bulacan	W 56–43	José Rizal University	4–4	
9	October 2	Pasay	L 64–70	Cuneta Astrodome	4–5	
10	October 11	Caloocan	L 75–84	José Rizal University	4–6	
11	October 18	Laguna	W 69–66	Lagao Gymnasium	5–6	
12	November 5	Muntinlupa	L 60–61	Caloocan Sports Complex	5–7	
13	November 14	Rizal	W 65–58	JCSGO Christian Academy	6–7	
14	November 24	Pasig	W 116–72	Lamitan Capitol Gymnasium	7–7	
15	November 29	San Juan	L 76–86	San Andres Sports Complex	7–8	
16	December 10	Manila	L 57–63	Bataan People's Center	7–9	
17	December 15	Navotas	W 80–73	Lagao Gymnasium	8–9	
18	January 9	Davao Occidental	W 84–83	Valenzuela Astrodome	9–9	
19	January 21	Basilan	W 83–81	Cuneta Astrodome	10–9	
20	January 30	Zamboanga	W 78–69	Navotas Sports Complex	11–9	
21	February 5	Parañaque	W 80–76	Cuneta Astrodome	12–9	
22	February 23	Valenzuela	L 72–79	Mayor Vitaliano D. Agan Coliseum	12–10	
23	March 4	Bacoor City	W 82–71	Strike Gymnasium	13–10	
24	March 6	Mandaluyong	W 93–89	Muntinlupa Sports Complex	14–10	
25	March 11	Batangas City	L 86–92	Batangas City Coliseum	14–11	
Source: Schedule

== Playoffs ==
=== Schedule ===
2019 GenSan Warriors playoffs schedule
Round	Game	Date	Opponent	Score	Location	Series	Recap
Division Quarterfinals	1	March 14	Bacoor City	L 80–90	Rizal Memorial Colleges	0–1	
Division Quarterfinals	2	March 16	Bacoor City	L 78–92	Lagao Gymnasium	0–2	
Source: Schedule
