= 2018–19 Imus Bandera season =

Basketball season

- Head coach: Jerry Codiñera; Mike Orquillas; Noynoy Falcasantos

Results
- Record: 11–14 (.440)
- Place: Division: 7th (South)
- Playoff finish: Division Quarterfinals (lost vs. 2018–19 Batangas City Athletics season

Imus Bandera seasons

The 2018–19 Imus Bandera season was the second season of the franchise in the Maharlika Pilipinas Basketball League (MPBL).

Imus finished the regular season 11–14, despite having gone 9–8 in the first 17 games. The Bandera were able to improve their 2–7 record from the previous season and clinched the South Division's seventh seed. They would face the defending champion Batangas City Athletics in the Division Quarterfinals. Although Imus was able to tie the series in game 2, they would lose the deciding game 3 in opposing grounds.

The team played all of their home games this season at Imus City Sports Complex.

== Regular season ==
=== Standings ===
Pos	Team	Pld	W	L	PCT	GB	Qualification
5	Bacoor City Strikers	25	13	12	.520	7	Playoffs
6	Zamboanga Family's Brand Sardines	25	12	13	.480	8	Playoffs
7	Imus Bandera	25	11	14	.440 (Note: Imus wins tiebreaker over Cebu City by head-to-head victory.)	9	Playoffs
8	Cebu City Sharks	25	11	14	.440	9	Playoffs
9	Laguna Heroes	25	10	15	.400	10	

Source: Standings
Rules for classification: 1) Wins; 2a) If two teams are tied, head-to-head match-up; 2b) If three or more teams are tied, head-to-head point quotient; 3) overall point quotient; 4) coin toss.

=== Schedule ===
2018–19 Imus Bandera season schedule
Game	Date	Opponent	Score	Location	Record	Recap
1	June 14	Davao Occidental	L 71–75	Alonte Sports Arena	0–1	
2	June 23	General Santos	L 73–79	Imus City Sports Complex	0–2	
3	July 4	Marikina	W 72–71	Marist School	1–2	
4	July 28	Bataan	L 85–95	Navotas Sports Complex	1–3	
5	August 9	Makati	W 79–76	Imus City Sports Complex	2–3	
6	August 22	Valenzuela	W 81–71	Muntinlupa Sports Complex	3–3	
7	September 4	Cebu City	W 90–61	Imus City Sports Complex	4–3	
8	September 13	Pampanga	W 88–76	Imus City Sports Complex	5–3	
9	September 27	Bulacan	L 113–117 (OT)	Bulacan Capitol Gymnasium	5–4	
10	October 10	Pasay	L 75–79	Muntinlupa Sports Complex	5–5	
11	October 24	Caloocan	L 69–74	Imus City Sports Complex	5–6	
12	November 8	Laguna	W 67–65	Ynares Sports Arena	6–6	
13	November 17	San Juan	L 50–77	Hoops Dome	6–7	
14	November 21	Navotas	W 79–78	Filoil Flying V Centre	7–7	
15	December 6	Muntinlupa	L 74–80	Imus City Sports Complex	7–8	
16	December 14	Pasig	W 117–87	Olivarez College	8–8	
17	January 4	Parañaque	W 95–77	Imus City Sports Complex	9–8	
18	January 15	Batangas City	L 93–96	Batangas State University	9–9	
19	January 23	Rizal	L 73–85	Filoil Flying V Centre	9–10	
20	February 1	Manila	L 68–69	San Andres Sports Complex	9–11	
21	February 13	Bacoor City	L 79–90	Cuneta Astrodome	9–12	
22	February 20	Quezon City	L 71–80	Blue Eagle Gym	9–13	
23	February 26	Basilan	W 113–108	San Andres Sports Complex	10–13	
24	March 4	Zamboanga	L 78–83	Strike Gymnasium	10–14	
25	March 11	Mandaluyong	W 107–90	Batangas City Coliseum	11–14	
Source: Schedule

== Playoffs ==
=== Schedule ===
2019 Imus Bandera playoffs schedule
Round	Game	Date	Opponent	Score	Location	Series	Recap
Division Quarterfinals	1	March 19	Batangas City	L 69–77	Batangas City Coliseum	0–1	
Division Quarterfinals	2	March 21	Batangas City	W 75–69	Muntinlupa Sports Complex	1–1	
Division Quarterfinals	3	March 25	Batangas City	L 65–92	Batangas City Coliseum	1–2	
Source: Schedule
