= 2018–19 Rizal Crusaders season =

- Head coach: Braulio Lim Jr.

Results
- Record: 7–18 (.280)
- Place: Division: 13th (South)

Rizal Crusaders seasons

The 2018–19 Rizal Crusaders season was the inaugural season of the franchise in the Maharlika Pilipinas Basketball League (MPBL). The Crusaders finished the season tied with the Basilan Steel for the worst record in the South Division, finishing with a 7–18 record.

The team played all of their home games this season at Ynares Center in Antipolo.

== Regular season ==
=== Standings ===
| Pos | Team | Pld | W | L | PCT | GB |
|---|---|---|---|---|---|---|
| 9 | Laguna Heroes | 25 | 10 | 15 | .400 | 10 |
| 10 | Parañaque Patriots | 25 | 8 | 17 | .320 (Note: Parañaque wins tiebreaker over Marikina by head-to-head victory.) | 12 |
| 11 | Marikina Shoemasters | 25 | 8 | 17 | .320 | 12 |
| 12 | Basilan Steel | 25 | 7 | 18 | .280 (Note: Basilan wins tiebreaker over Rizal by head-to-head victory.) | 13 |
| 13 | Rizal Crusaders | 25 | 7 | 18 | .280 | 13 |

Source: Standings
Rules for classification: 1) Wins; 2a) If two teams are tied, head-to-head match-up; 2b) If three or more teams are tied, head-to-head point quotient; 3) overall point quotient; 4) coin toss.

=== Schedule ===
2018–19 Rizal Crusaders season schedule
| Game | Date | Opponent | Score | Location | Record | Recap |
|---|---|---|---|---|---|---|
| 1 | June 19 | Bulacan | L 61–80 | Baliwag Star Arena | 0–1 | |
| 2 | June 28 | Pasay | L 81–87 | Ynares Center | 0–2 | |
| 3 | July 10 | Caloocan | L 80–92 | Batangas City Coliseum | 0–3 | |
| 4 | July 19 | Laguna | W 80–79 | Alonte Sports Arena | 1–3 | |
| 5 | July 31 | Mandaluyong | L 51–65 | Ynares Center | 1–4 | |
| 6 | August 9 | Muntinlupa | L 80–84 | Imus City Sports Complex | 1–5 | |
| 7 | August 21 | Zamboanga | W 77–73 | Pasig Sports Center | 2–5 | |
| 8 | August 30 | Pasig | L 78–81 | University of Southeastern Philippines | 2–6 | |
| 9 | September 11 | Navotas | L 81–87 | Ynares Center | 2–7 | |
| 10 | September 20 | Marikina | W 75–69 | Batangas City Coliseum | 3–7 | |
| 11 | October 9 | San Juan | W 85–77 | Trinity University of Asia | 4–7 | |
| 12 | October 16 | Bacoor City | L 63–74 | Ynares Center | 4–8 | |
| 13 | October 23 | Parañaque | L 47–59 | Bataan People's Center | 4–9 | |
| 14 | November 7 | Batangas City (OT) | L 90–92 | Ynares Center | 4–10 | |
| 15 | November 14 | General Santos | L 58–65 | JCSGO Christian Academy | 4–11 | |
| 16 | November 26 | Cebu City | W 80–57 | Ynares Sports Arena | 5–11 | |
| 17 | December 11 | Valenzuela | L 74–76 | Ynares Center | 5–12 | |
| 18 | December 20 | Bataan | L 74–88 | Blue Eagle Gym | 5–13 | |
| 19 | January 7 | Manila | L 70–71 | Bataan People's Center | 5–14 | |
| 20 | January 16 | Makati | L 55–66 | Bataan People's Center | 5–15 | |
| 21 | January 23 | Imus | W 85–73 | Filoil Flying V Centre | 6–15 | |
| 22 | February 1 | Quezon City | L 79–81 | San Andres Sports Complex | 6–16 | |
| 23 | February 9 | Pampanga | W 85–76 | Batangas City Coliseum | 7–16 | |
| 24 | February 21 | Davao Occidental | L 74–84 | Muntinlupa Sports Complex | 7–17 | |
| 25 | March 5 | Basilan | L 90–94 | Angeles University Foundation | 7–18 | |
Source: Schedule
