= 2018–19 Quezon City Capitals season =

- Head coach: Vis Valencia

Results
- Record: 12–13 (.480)
- Place: Division: 7th (North)
- Playoff finish: Division Semifinals (lost vs. San Juan, 0–2)

Quezon City Capitals seasons

The 2018–19 Quezon City Capitals season was the second season of the franchise in the Maharlika Pilipinas Basketball League (MPBL). The team concluded their season in the Division Semifinals, where they were swept by the eventual champion San Juan Knights.

Heading into the playoffs, Quezon City finished one game below .500 with a 12–13 record after stating the season 3–8. This was a decrease from their 5–4 record in the previous season. The Capitals claimed the seventh seed in the North Division and were matched with the second-seeded Makati Super Crunch in the Division Quarterfinals. They would go on to beat Makati in two games in a playoff upset and advanced to the Division Semifinals against third-seed San Juan. This time around, Quezon City lost to the Knights in two games.

The team played their most of their home games at the Blue Eagle Gym in the campus of Ateneo de Manila University. Other venues include JCSGO Christian Academy, returning from the previous season, and the Henry Noble Gymnasium in the campus of the Trinity University of Asia.

== Regular season ==
=== Standings ===
Pos	Team	Pld	W	L	PCT	GB	Qualification
5	Bulacan Kuyas	25	14	11	.560	9	Playoffs
6	Navotas Clutch	25	12	13	.480 (Note: Navotas wins tiebreaker over Quezon City by head-to-head victory.)	11	Playoffs
7	Quezon City Capitals	25	12	13	.480	11	Playoffs
8	Caloocan Supremos	25	11	14	.440 (Note: Caloocan wins tiebreaker over Pampanga by head-to-head victory.)	12	Playoffs
9	Pampanga Lanterns	25	11	14	.440	12	

Source: Standings
Rules for classification: 1) Wins; 2a) If two teams are tied, head-to-head match-up; 2b) If three or more teams are tied, head-to-head point quotient; 3) overall point quotient; 4) coin toss.

=== Schedule ===
2018–19 Quezon City Capitals season schedule
Game	Date	Opponent	Score	Location	Record	Recap
1	June 13	Batangas City	L 90–95	Caloocan Sports Complex	0–1	
2	June 26	Davao Occidental	L 78–90	Pasig Sports Center	0–2	
3	July 5	General Santos	W 77–72	Blue Eagle Gym	1–2	
4	July 26	Marikina	L 74–78	Pasig Sports Center	1–3	
5	August 8	Bataan	L 68–101	Blue Eagle Gym	1–4	
6	September 8	Valenzuela	W 76–72	Ynares Sports Arena	2–4	
7	September 26	Pampanga	L 94–97	San Andres Sports Complex	2–5	
8	October 9	Bulacan	L 55–61	Trinity University of Asia	2–6	
9	October 20	Pasay	L 81–83	Rizal Memorial Colleges	2–7	
10	November 5	Caloocan	W 81–79	Caloocan Sports Complex	3–7	
11	November 14	Manila	L 81–83	JCSGO Christian Academy	3–8	
12	November 28	Muntinlupa	W 100–97 (OT)	Muntinlupa Sports Complex	4–8	
13	December 8	Zamboanga	W 109–81	San Andres Sports Complex	5–8	
14	December 20	Laguna	W 85–80	Blue Eagle Gym	6–8	
15	January 3	Pasig	L 95–98	Alonte Sports Arena	6–9	
16	January 8	Mandaluyong	W 86–76	Pasig Sports Center	7–9	
17	January 14	Parañaque	W 65–64	Olivarez College	8–9	
18	January 24	Bacoor City	L 87–90	Strike Gymnasium	8–10	
19	February 1	Rizal	W 91–79	San Andres Sports Complex	9–10	
20	February 6	Basilan	W 74–68	Navotas Sports Complex	10–10	
21	February 11	San Juan	L 50–68	Filoil Flying V Centre	10–11	
22	February 20	Imus	W 80–71	Blue Eagle Gym	11–11	
23	February 25	Makati	L 78–102	Filoil Flying V Centre	11–12	
24	February 28	Cebu City	W 75–68	Bataan People's Center	12–12	
25	March 7	Navotas	L 105–120	Navotas Sports Complex	12–13	
Source: Schedule

== Playoffs ==
=== Schedule ===
2019 Quezon City Capitals playoffs schedule
Round	Game	Date	Opponent	Score	Location	Series	Recap
Division Quarterfinals	1	March 13	Makati	W 88–77	Ynares Sports Arena	1–0	
Division Quarterfinals	2	March 18	Makati	W 77–74	Filoil Flying V Centre	2–0	
Division Semifinals	1	March 26	San Juan	L 86–94	Bataan People's Center	0–1	
Division Semifinals	2	March 28	San Juan	L 81–106	Filoil Flying V Centre	0–2	
Source: Schedule
