= 2018–19 Pampanga Lanterns season =

Basketball season

- Head coach: Isaiah Dueñas; Aldrin Morante

Results
- Record: 11–14 (.440)
- Place: Division: 9th (North)

Pampanga Lanterns seasons

The 2018–19 Pampanga Lanterns season was the inaugural season of the franchise in the Maharlika Pilipinas Basketball League (MPBL).

Pampanga finished the regular season tied with the Caloocan Supremos for 8th place as both teams finished 11–14. Unfortunately, Pampanga lost the tiebreaker due to the team's head-to-head defeat against Caloocan. As of 2023, it was the only time the Pampanga franchise missed the playoffs.

All of their games were played at Angeles University Foundation in Angeles City. It was also the only season in which the team used the name Pampanga Lanterns, as they would switch to the Pampanga Giant Lanterns next season.

== Regular season ==
=== Standings ===
Pos	Team	Pld	W	L	PCT	GB	Qualification
7	Quezon City Capitals	25	12	13	.480 (Note: Navotas wins tiebreaker over Quezon City by head-to-head victory.)	11	Playoffs
8	Caloocan Supremos	25	11	14	.440 (Note: Caloocan wins tiebreaker over Pampanga by head-to-head victory.)	12	Playoffs
9	Pampanga Lanterns	25	11	14	.440	12	
10	Valenzuela Classic	25	10	15	.400	13	
11	Mandaluyong El Tigre	25	8	17	.320 (Note: Mandaluyong wins tiebreaker over Pasay by head-to-head victory.)	15	

Source: Standings
Rules for classification: 1) Wins; 2a) If two teams are tied, head-to-head match-up; 2b) If three or more teams are tied, head-to-head point quotient; 3) overall point quotient; 4) coin toss.

=== Schedule ===
2018–19 Pampanga Lanterns season schedule
Game	Date	Opponent	Score	Location	Record	Recap
1	June 20	San Juan	L 70–93	Angeles University Foundation	0–1	
2	July 3	Bacoor City	W 81–80	Olivarez College	1–1	
3	July 16	Parañaque	W 82–79	Angeles University Foundation	2–1	
4	July 25	Basilan	L 79–88	Bulacan Capitol Gymnasium	2–2	
5	August 4	Manila	L 75–100	Angeles University Foundation	2–3	
6	August 15	Batangas City	W 80–75	Olivarez College	3–3	
7	August 25	Davao Occidental	L 77–82	Alonte Sports Arena	3–4	
8	September 1	General Santos	L 64–72	Lagao Gymnasium	3–5	
9	September 13	Imus	L 76–88	Imus City Sports Complex	3–6	
10	September 26	Quezon City	W 97–84	San Andres Sports Complex	4–6	
11	October 4	Bataan	L 74–87	Valenzuela Astrodome	4–7	
12	October 17	Makati	L 67–69	Angeles University Foundation	4–8	
13	October 24	Valenzuela	L 82–90	Imus City Sports Complex	4–9	
14	October 31	Navotas	W 89–88	Alonte Sports Arena	5–9	
15	November 12	Bulacan	L 65–67	Angeles University Foundation	5–10	
16	November 22	Laguna	W 75–58	Bulacan Capitol Gymnasium	6–10	
17	December 4	Pasay	W 86–83	Strike Gymnasium	7–10	
18	December 12	Caloocan	L 62–78	Caloocan Sports Complex	7–11	
19	January 12	Cebu City	L 68–69	Angeles University Foundation	7–12	
20	January 26	Muntinlupa	W 87–80	Angeles University Foundation	8–12	
21	February 2	Mandaluyong	W 90–85	Angeles University Foundation	9–12	
22	February 9	Rizal	L 76–85	Batangas City Coliseum	9–13	
23	February 14	Pasig	L 67–69	Pasig Sports Center	9–14	
24	March 5	Marikina	W 91–76	Angeles University Foundation	10–14	
25	March 9	Zamboanga	W 87–85	Angeles University Foundation	11–14	
Source: Schedule
