= 2018–19 Pasig Pirates season =

- Head coach: James Machate; Ronjay Enrile

Results
- Record: 4–21 (.160)
- Place: Division: 13th (North)

Pasig Pirates seasons

The 2018–19 Pasig Pirates season was the inaugural season of the franchise in the Maharlika Pilipinas Basketball League (MPBL). The team finished the regular season 4–21, which was the worst overall record that season.

All of their home games this season were played at Pasig Sports Center.

== Regular season ==
=== Standings ===
Pos	Team	Pld	W	L	PCT	GB
9	Pampanga Lanterns	25	11	14	.440 (Note: Caloocan wins tiebreaker over Pampanga by head-to-head victory.)	12
10	Valenzuela Classic	25	10	15	.400	13
11	Mandaluyong El Tigre	25	8	17	.320 (Note: Mandaluyong wins tiebreaker over Pasay by head-to-head victory.)	15
12	Pasay Voyagers	25	8	17	.320	15
13	Pasig Pirates	25	4	21	.160	19

Source: Standings
Rules for classification: 1) Wins; 2a) If two teams are tied, head-to-head match-up; 2b) If three or more teams are tied, head-to-head point quotient; 3) overall point quotient; 4) coin toss.

=== Schedule ===
2018–19 Pasig Pirates season schedule
Game	Date	Opponent	Score	Location	Record	Recap
1	June 13	Caloocan	L 81–91	Caloocan Sports Complex	0–1	
2	June 26	Laguna	L 75–83	Pasig Sports Center	0–2	
3	July 5	Mandaluyong	L 55–98	Blue Eagle Gym	0–3	
4	July 26	Zamboanga	L 78–92	Pasig Sports Center	0–4	
5	August 7	Marikina	L 67–71	Marist School	0–5	
6	August 21	Navotas	L 70–97	Pasig Sports Center	0–6	
7	August 30	Rizal	W 81–78	University of Southeastern Philippines	1–6	
8	September 12	San Juan	L 60–87	Bataan People's Center	1–7	
9	September 25	Bacoor City	L 59–84	Strike Gymnasium	1–8	
10	October 3	Parañaque	L 69–87	Strike Gymnasium	1–9	
11	October 25	Basilan	W 102–77	Strike Gymnasium	2–9	
12	November 3	Cebu City	L 53–56	Bataan People's Center	2–10	
13	November 13	Valenzuela	L 88–95	Cuneta Astrodome	2–11	
14	November 24	General Santos	L 72–116	Lamitan Capitol Gymnasium	2–12	
15	December 5	Davao Occidental	L 82–88	Marist School	2–13	
16	December 14	Imus	L 87–117	Olivarez College	2–14	
17	January 3	Quezon City	W 98–95	Alonte Sports Arena	3–14	
18	January 8	Makati	L 71–76	Pasig Sports Center	3–15	
19	January 15	Bulacan	L 96–102	Batangas State University	3–16	
20	January 22	Manila	L 98–111	San Andres Sports Complex	3–17	
21	January 31	Batangas City	L 62–69	Caloocan Sports Complex	3–18	
22	February 7	Muntinlupa	L 62–69 (OT)	Muntinlupa Sports Complex	3–19	
23	February 14	Pampanga	W 69–67	Pasig Sports Center	4–19	
24	February 27	Pasay	L 84–71	Bulacan Capitol Gymnasium	4–20	
25	March 7	Bataan	L 87–105	Navotas Sports Complex	4–21	
Source: Schedule
