= 2018–19 Mandaluyong El Tigre season =

- Head coach: Mac Cuan; Arlene Rodriguez

Results
- Record: 8–17 (.320)
- Place: Division: 11th (North)

Mandaluyong El Tigre seasons

The 2018–19 Mandaluyong El Tigre season was the inaugural and currently the only active season of the franchise in the Maharlika Pilipinas Basketball League (MPBL).

Noted for the acquisition of Bobby Ray Parks Jr., the El Tigre began the season 6–1 before only winning two of their remaining eighteen games that season, ending with a record of 8–17.

The El Tigre played all of their home games at José Rizal University. They were also the designated home team for their 15th game at Ynares Sports Arena in Pasig.

== Roster ==
2018–19 Mandaluyong El Tigre roster
Players

Pos.	No.	Name	Height	Weight	DOB	From
	0	John Arthur Vidal			1994–10–24
	2	Xian Lim	6 ft 2 in (1.88 m)		1989–07–09	UE
F	3	Gian Lloyd Abrigo (HG)			1990–08–03
	5	Jopet Quiro (HG)			1991–01–15
	6	Timoteo Gatchalian (HG)			1983–03–03	De La Salle
	7	Kirk Jan Vista (HG)			1996–06–15
F/C	9	Prince Rivero	6 ft 3 in (1.91 m)		1995–02–19	De La Salle
F/C	11	Bernzon Franco (EP)	6 ft 4 in (1.93 m)			Philippine Christian
	12	Antonio Bonsubre Jr.			1993–10–26	San Beda
	13	Jonathan Boholano (HG)			1996–12–19	RTU
F	15	Jeff Javillonar (EP)	6 ft 3 in (1.91 m)		1993–01–01	National-U
	18	John Paul Caulilan			1996–09–18
G	23	Josan Nimes (EP)	6 ft 3 in (1.91 m)	175 lb (79 kg)	1991–05–11	Mapúa
	24	Axel Torres			1993–08–17	De La Salle
G	27	Thomas Torres (injured)	5 ft 9 in (1.75 m)		1994–10–27	De La Salle
	30	Jojo Cunanan			1984–06–14
	33	Rogie Santiago			1990–06–23
C	63	JR Alabanza (EP)				UE

Coaches

Head coach

- Arlene Rodriguez

Assistant coach(es)

- Mac Cuan

Legend

- (HG) Homegrown
- (FF) Filipino-foreigner
- (SGL) Special Guest Licensee
- (RS) Reserve player
- Injured

== Regular season ==
=== Standings ===
Pos	Team	Pld	W	L	PCT	GB
9	Pampanga Lanterns	25	11	14	.440 (Note: Caloocan wins tiebreaker over Pampanga by head-to-head victory.)	12
10	Valenzuela Classic	25	10	15	.400	13
11	Mandaluyong El Tigre	25	8	17	.320 (Note: Mandaluyong wins tiebreaker over Pasay by head-to-head victory.)	15
12	Pasay Voyagers	25	8	17	.320	15
13	Pasig Pirates	25	4	21	.160	19

Source: Standings
Rules for classification: 1) Wins; 2a) If two teams are tied, head-to-head match-up; 2b) If three or more teams are tied, head-to-head point quotient; 3) overall point quotient; 4) coin toss.

=== Schedule ===
2018–19 Mandaluyong El Tigre season schedule
Game	Date	Opponent	Score	Location	Record	Recap
1	June 12	Muntinlupa	L 74–86	Smart Araneta Coliseum	0–1	
2	June 23	Zamboanga	W 71–61	Imus City Sports Complex	1–1	
3	July 5	Pasig	W 98–55	Blue Eagle Gym	2–1	
4	July 18	Navotas	W 59–55	Bataan People's Center	3–1	
5	July 31	Rizal	W 65–51	Ynares Center	4–1	
6	August 23	Bacoor City	W 83–61	Strike Gymnasium	5–1	
7	September 5	Parañaque	W 77–75	Filoil Flying V Centre	6–1	
8	September 18	Basilan	L 68–70	José Rizal University	6–2	
9	September 26	Manila	L 73–92	San Andres Sports Complex	6–3	
10	October 11	Batangas City	L 57–61	José Rizal University	6–4	
11	October 20	Davao Occidental	L 63–86	Rizal Memorial Colleges	6–5	
12	October 31	Laguna	L 72–76	Alonte Sports Arena	6–6	
13	November 13	Pasay	L 70–74	Cuneta Astrodome	6–7	
14	November 20	Valenzuela	L 64–78	Valenzuela Astrodome	6–8	
15	December 3	Bulacan	W 102–91	Ynares Sports Arena	7–8	
16	December 11	Makati	L 63–79	Ynares Center	7–9	
17	December 15	Marikina	L 62–76	Lagao Gymnasium	7–10	
18	January 8	Quezon City	L 76–86	Pasig Sports Center	7–11	
19	January 17	Caloocan	L 77–83	Caloocan Sports Complex	7–12	
20	January 26	Cebu City	W 75–67	Angeles University Foundation	8–12	
21	February 2	Pampanga	L 85–90	Angeles University Foundation	8–13	
22	February 12	Bataan	L 65–109	Valenzuela Astrodome	8–14	
23	February 19	San Juan	L 60–76	San Andres Sports Complex	8–15	
24	March 6	General Santos	L 89–93	Muntinlupa Sports Center	8–16	
25	March 11	Imus	L 90–107	Batangas City Coliseum	8–17	
Source: Schedule
