= 2018–19 San Juan Knights season =

- MPBL champions
- Division champions
- Head coach: Randy Alcantara

Results
- Record: 20–5 (.800)
- Place: Division: 3rd (North)
- Playoff finish: MPBL champions (won vs. Davao Occidental, 3–2)

San Juan Knights seasons

The 2018–19 San Juan Knights season was the inaugural season of the franchise in the Maharlika Pilipinas Basketball League (MPBL).

The Knights finished the season third in the North Division, after a 20–5 campaign. San Juan swept both Navotas and Quezon City in the first two rounds before meeting the Manila Stars in the division finals. The Stars, who also finished 20–5, took the first game of the series. San Juan, however, fought back, and won the next two games, including the deciding game at home to advance to the national finals against the Davao Occidental Tigers. The series went back-and-forth, leading to a deciding game 5 that would be played on opposing grounds. After gaining the lead late in the fourth quarter, San Juan claimed their first MPBL championship.

The team played all of their home games this season at the Filoil Flying V Centre.

== Regular season ==
=== Standings ===
Pos	Team	Pld	W	L	PCT	GB	Qualification
1	Bataan Risers	25	23	2	.920	—	Playoffs
2	Makati Super Crunch	25	21	4	.840	2	Playoffs
3	San Juan Knights	25	20	5	.800 (Note: San Juan wins tiebreaker over Manila by head-to-head victory.)	3	Playoffs
4	Manila Stars	25	20	5	.800	3	Playoffs
5	Bulacan Kuyas	25	14	11	.560	9	Playoffs

Source: Standings
Rules for classification: 1) Wins; 2a) If two teams are tied, head-to-head match-up; 2b) If three or more teams are tied, head-to-head point quotient; 3) overall point quotient; 4) coin toss.

=== Schedule ===
2018–19 San Juan Knights season schedule
Game	Date	Opponent	Score	Location	Record	Recap
1	June 20	Pampanga	W 93–70	Angeles University Foundation	1–0	
2	June 30	Bulacan	W 94–76	Valenzuela Astrodome	2–0	
3	July 11	Pasay	W 89–66	Filoil Flying V Centre	3–0	
4	July 21	Caloocan	W 81–77	Caloocan Sports Complex	4–0	
5	August 1	Laguna	W 81–56	Filoil Flying V Centre	5–0	
6	August 22	Muntinlupa	L 71–77	Muntinlupa Sports Complex	5–1	
7	September 5	Zamboanga	W 80–59	Filoil Flying V Centre	6–1	
8	September 12	Pasig	W 87–60	Bataan People's Center	7–1	
9	September 25	Navotas	W 81–74	Strike Gymnasium	8–1	
10	October 9	Rizal	L 77–85	Trinity University of Asia	8–2	
11	October 13	Marikina	W 77–65	Marist School	9–2	
12	October 25	Bacoor City	W 74–63	Strike Gymnasium	10–2	
13	October 30	Batangas City	L 78–85	Batangas City Coliseum	10–3	
14	November 10	Cebu City	W 71–62	Filoil Flying V Centre	11–3	
15	November 17	Imus	W 77–50	Hoops Dome	12–3	
16	November 21	Manila (OT)	W 84–80	Filoil Flying V Centre	13–3	
17	November 29	General Santos	W 86–76	San Andres Sports Complex	14–3	
18	December 10	Bataan	W 67–61	Bataan People's Center	15–3	
19	December 18	Davao Occidental	L 75–87	Rizal Memorial Colleges	15–4	
20	January 12	Basilan	W 95–84	Angeles University Foundation	16–4	
21	January 23	Parañaque	W 87–77	Filoil Flying V Centre	17–4	
22	January 28	Makati	L 73–78	Alonte Sports Arena	17–5	
23	February 11	Quezon City	W 68–50	Filoil Flying V Centre	18–5	
24	February 19	Mandaluyong	W 76–60	San Andres Sports Complex	19–5	
25	February 25	Valenzuela	W 102–83	Filoil Flying V Centre	20–5	
Source: Schedule

== Playoffs ==
=== Schedule ===
2019 San Juan Knights playoffs schedule
Round	Game	Date	Opponent	Score	Location	Series	Recap
Division quarterfinals	1	March 13	Navotas	W 81–76	Ynares Sports Arena	1–0	
Division quarterfinals	2	March 18	Navotas	W 75–69	Filoil Flying V Centre	2–0	
Division semifinals	1	March 26	Quezon City	W 94–86	Bataan People's Center	1–0	
Division semifinals	2	March 28	Quezon City	W 106–81	Filoil Flying V Centre	2–0	
Division finals	1	April 4	Manila	L 88–91	Filoil Flying V Centre	0–1	
Division finals	2	April 6	Manila	W 92–90	San Andres Sports Complex	1–1	
Division finals	3	April 8	Manila	W 85–74	Filoil Flying V Centre	2–1	
National finals	1	April 11	Davao Occidental	W 84–74	Davao City Recreation Center	1–0	
National finals	2	April 13	Davao Occidental	L 60–67	Rizal Memorial Colleges	1–1	
National finals	3	April 16	Davao Occidental	W 67–62	Filoil Flying V Centre	2–1	
National finals	4	April 22	Davao Occidental	L 66–77	Filoil Flying V Centre	2–2	
National finals	5	April 25	Davao Occidental	W 87–86	Rizal Memorial Colleges	3–2	
Source: Schedule
