= 2018–19 Valenzuela Classic season =

- Head coach: Chris Gavina; Eric Samson; Juven Formacil

Results
- Record: 10–15 (.400)
- Place: Division: 10th (North)

Valenzuela Classic seasons

The 2018–19 Valenzuela Classic season was the second season of the franchise in the Maharlika Pilipinas Basketball League (MPBL).

The Classic failed to improve their 6–3 record in the previous season, as they would only finish 10–15. They would miss the playoffs, after placing 10th in the North Division.

== Regular season ==
=== Standings ===
| Pos | Team | Pld | W | L | PCT | GB | Qualification |
|---|---|---|---|---|---|---|---|
| 8 | Caloocan Supremos | 25 | 11 | 14 | .440 (Note: Caloocan wins tiebreaker over Pampanga by head-to-head victory.) | 12 | Playoffs |
| 9 | Pampanga Lanterns | 25 | 11 | 14 | .440 | 12 | |
| 10 | Valenzuela Classic | 25 | 10 | 15 | .400 | 13 | |
| 11 | Mandaluyong El Tigre | 25 | 8 | 17 | .320 (Note: Mandaluyong wins tiebreaker over Pasay by head-to-head victory.) | 15 | |
| 12 | Pasay Voyagers | 25 | 8 | 17 | .320 | 15 | |

Source: Standings
Rules for classification: 1) Wins; 2a) If two teams are tied, head-to-head match-up; 2b) If three or more teams are tied, head-to-head point quotient; 3) overall point quotient; 4) coin toss.

=== Schedule ===
2018–19 Valenzuela Classic season schedule
| Game | Date | Opponent | Score | Location | Record | Recap |
|---|---|---|---|---|---|---|
| 1 | June 20 | Parañaque | L 73–76 | Angeles University Foundation | 0–1 | |
| 2 | June 30 | Basilan | W 96–94 | Valenzuela Astrodome | 1–1 | |
| 3 | July 11 | Manila | L 84–89 | Filoil Flying V Centre | 1–2 | |
| 4 | July 21 | Batangas City | W 78–66 | Caloocan Sports Complex | 2–2 | |
| 5 | August 22 | Imus | L 71–81 | Muntinlupa Sports Complex | 2–3 | |
| 6 | August 30 | Davao Occidental | L 85–92 | University of Southeastern Philippines | 2–4 | |
| 7 | September 8 | Quezon City | L 72–76 | Ynares Sports Arena | 2–5 | |
| 8 | September 12 | Bataan | L 55–59 | Bataan People's Center | 2–6 | |
| 9 | September 22 | Makati | L 64–67 | Ynares Sports Arena | 2–7 | |
| 10 | October 4 | Marikina | W 102–99 (2OT) | Valenzuela Astrodome | 3–7 | |
| 11 | October 16 | Cebu City | L 75–78 | Ynares Center | 3–8 | |
| 12 | October 24 | Pampanga | W 90–82 | Imus City Sports Complex | 4–8 | |
| 13 | November 6 | Bacoor City | L 81–88 | Valenzuela Astrodome | 4–9 | |
| 14 | November 13 | Pasig | W 95–88 | Cuneta Astrodome | 5–9 | |
| 15 | November 20 | Mandaluyong | W 78–64 | Valenzuela Astrodome | 6–9 | |
| 16 | December 1 | Navotas | L 70–72 | Alonte Sports Arena | 6–10 | |
| 17 | December 11 | Rizal | W 76–74 | Ynares Center | 7–10 | |
| 18 | December 22 | Caloocan | L 87–90 | Bulacan Capitol Gymnasium | 7–11 | |
| 19 | January 9 | Muntinlupa | L 86–90 | Valenzuela Astrodome | 7–12 | |
| 20 | January 17 | Zamboanga | L 71–79 | Caloocan Sports Complex | 7–13 | |
| 21 | January 29 | Pasay | W 93–80 | Valenzuela Astrodome | 8–13 | |
| 22 | February 4 | Laguna | L 66–74 | Bataan People's Center | 8–14 | |
| 23 | February 12 | Bulacan | W 84–75 | Valenzuela Astrodome | 9–14 | |
| 24 | February 23 | General Santos | W 79–72 | Mayor Vitaliano D. Agan Coliseum | 10–14 | |
| 25 | February 25 | San Juan | L 83–102 | Filoil Flying V Centre | 10–15 | |
Source: Schedule
