= 2018–19 Makati Super Crunch season =

- Head coach: Pocholo Villanueva

Results
- Record: 21–4 (.840)
- Place: Division: 2nd (North)
- Playoff finish: Division Quarterfinals (lost vs. Quezon City, 0–2)

Makati Super Crunch seasons

The 2018–19 Makati Super Crunch season was the inaugural season of the franchise in the Maharlika Pilipinas Basketball League (MPBL).

The expansion franchise, originally named the Makati Skyscrapers, finished the regular season with the best record among expansion teams with a 21–4 record, capping off with a 15-game winning streak after starting the season 6–4. Unfortunately, their playoff run would be cut short via an upset loss against the seventh-seeded Quezon City Capitals. The Super Crunch would lose in two games.

The Super Crunch did not play any home games within Makati this season. All of their designated home games were instead played at Ynares Sports Arena in Pasig with the exception of their 16th game in which Mandaluyong was the host team.

== Regular season ==
=== Standings ===
Pos	Team	Pld	W	L	PCT	GB	Qualification
1	Bataan Risers	25	23	2	.920	—	Playoffs
2	Makati Super Crunch	25	21	4	.840	2	Playoffs
3	San Juan Knights	25	20	5	.800 (Note: San Juan wins tiebreaker over Manila by head-to-head victory.)	3	Playoffs
4	Manila Stars	25	20	5	.800	3	Playoffs
5	Bulacan Kuyas	25	14	11	.560	9	Playoffs

Source: Standings
Rules for classification: 1) Wins; 2a) If two teams are tied, head-to-head match-up; 2b) If three or more teams are tied, head-to-head point quotient; 3) overall point quotient; 4) coin toss.

=== Schedule ===
2018–19 Makati Super Crunch season schedule
Game	Date	Opponent	Score	Location	Record	Recap
1	June 19	Basilan	W 77–65	Baliwag Star Arena	1–0	
2	June 28	Manila	W 99–98	Ynares Center	2–0	
3	July 10	Batangas City	L 65–72	Batangas City Coliseum	2–1	
4	July 19	Davao Occidental	W 79–77	Alonte Sports Arena	3–1	
5	July 31	General Santos	W 86–71	Ynares Center	4–1	
6	August 9	Imus	L 76–79	Imus City Sports Complex	4–2	
7	September 1	Bataan	L 70–72	Lagao Gymnasium	4–3	
8	September 8	Marikina	W 90–71	Ynares Sports Arena	5–3	
9	September 22	Valenzuela	W 67–64	Ynares Sports Arena	6–3	
10	October 6	Cebu City	L 66–70	University of San Jose–Recoletos	6–4	
11	October 17	Pampanga	W 69–67	Angeles University Foundation	7–4	
12	October 30	Bulacan	W 99–94	Batangas City Coliseum	8–4	
13	November 7	Zamboanga	W 77–65	Ynares Center	9–4	
14	November 19	Muntinlupa	W 52–50	Marist School	10–4	
15	November 26	Bacoor City	W 73–67	Ynares Sports Arena	11–4	
16	December 3	Caloocan	W 79–57	Ynares Sports Arena (Note: Mandaluyong El Tigre was the designated home team on December 3.)	12–4	
17	December 11	Mandaluyong	W 79–63	Ynares Center	13–4	
18	December 19	Pasay	W 67–59	Batangas City Coliseum	14–4	
19	January 8	Pasig	W 76–71	Pasig Sports Center	15–4	
20	January 16	Rizal	W 66–55	Bataan People's Center	16–4	
21	January 28	San Juan	W 78–73	Alonte Sports Arena	17–4	
22	February 6	Navotas	W 96–87	Navotas Sports Complex	18–4	
23	February 10	Parañaque	W 75–50	Pasig Sports Center	19–4	
24	February 20	Laguna	W 76–65	Blue Eagle Gym	20–4	
25	February 25	Quezon City	W 102–78	Filoil Flying V Centre	21–4	
Source: Schedule

== Playoffs ==
=== Schedule ===
2019 Makati Super Crunch playoffs schedule
Round	Game	Date	Opponent	Score	Location	Series	Recap
Division Quarterfinals	1	March 13	Quezon City	L 77–88	Ynares Sports Arena	0–1	
Division Quarterfinals	2	March 18	Quezon City	L 74–77	Filoil Flying V Centre	0–2	
Source: Schedule
