= 2018–19 Parañaque Patriots season =

- Head coach: Eric Samson; Richie Melencio; Monel Kallos

Results
- Record: 8–17 (.320)
- Place: Division: 10th (South)

Parañaque Patriots seasons

The 2018–19 Parañaque Patriots season was the second season of the franchise in the Maharlika Pilipinas Basketball League (MPBL).

Parañaque started the season 9–7, but would go on to lose the remaining nine games. One of their wins then turned into a forfeit loss after failing to show up in a replay of their game against the Bacoor City Strikers. Their final record would end up at 8–17, missing the playoffs after making the Semifinals in the previous season.

The team played all of their home games this season at Olivarez College.

== Regular season ==
=== Standings ===
Pos	Team	Pld	W	L	PCT	GB	Qualification
8	Cebu City Sharks	25	11	14	.440 (Note: Imus wins tiebreaker over Cebu City by head-to-head victory.)	9	Playoffs
9	Laguna Heroes	25	10	15	.400	10	
10	Parañaque Patriots	25	8	17	.320 (Note: Parañaque wins tiebreaker over Marikina by head-to-head victory.)	12	
11	Marikina Shoemasters	25	8	17	.320	12	
12	Basilan Steel	25	7	18	.280 (Note: Basilan wins tiebreaker over Rizal by head-to-head victory.)	13	

Source: Standings
Rules for classification: 1) Wins; 2a) If two teams are tied, head-to-head match-up; 2b) If three or more teams are tied, head-to-head point quotient; 3) overall point quotient; 4) coin toss.

=== Schedule ===
2018–19 Parañaque Patriots season schedule
Game	Date	Opponent	Score	Location	Record	Recap
1	June 20	Valenzuela	W 76–73	Angeles University Foundation	1–0	
2	July 3	Cebu City	W 81–73	Olivarez College	2–0	
3	July 16	Pampanga	L 79–82	Angeles University Foundation	2–1	
4	July 25	Bulacan	L 58–77	Bulacan Capitol Gymnasium	2–2	
5	August 4	Pasay	W 73–69	Angeles University Foundation	3–2	
6	August 15	Caloocan	W 94–87	Olivarez College	4–2	
7	August 25	Laguna	L 52–76	Alonte Sports Arena	4–3	
8	September 5	Mandaluyong	L 75–77	Filoil Flying V Centre	4–4	
9	September 13	Muntinlupa	L 76–77	Imus City Sports Complex	4–5	
10	September 29	Zamboanga	W 68–58	Caloocan Sports Complex	5–5	
11	October 3	Pasig	W 87–69	Strike Gymnasium	6–5	
12	October 17	Navotas	L 83–90	Angeles University Foundation	6–6	
13	October 23	Rizal	W 59–47	Bataan People's Center	7–6	
14	November 6	Manila	L 88–98	Valenzuela Astrodome	7–7	
15	November 28	Marikina	W 71–68	Muntinlupa Sports Complex	8–7	
16	December 6	Batangas City	L 57–71	Imus City Sports Complex	8–8	
17	December 14	Basilan	L 84–89	Olivarez College	8–9	
18	January 4	Imus	L 77–95	Imus City Sports Complex	8–10	
19	January 14	Quezon City	L 64–65	Olivarez College	8–11	
20	January 23	San Juan	L 77–87	Filoil Flying V Centre	8–12	
21	January 29	Davao Occidental	L 82–92	Valenzuela Astrodome	8–13	
22	February 5	General Santos	L 76–80	Cuneta Astrodome	8–14	
23	February 14	Makati	L 50–75	Pasig Sports Center	8–15	
24	February 28	Bataan	L 73–102	Bataan People's Center	8–16	
25	March 11 (Note: Originally played on November 15, the game originally was an 82–81 win. Due to a scoring error, the game would have been replayed at 81–81 in overtime, but Parañaque did not show up during the replay, forfeiting the game.)	Bacoor City	L by forfeit	Strike Gymnasium	8–17	
Source: Schedule
