= 2018–19 Bataan Risers season =

- Head coach: Jojo Lastimosa

Results
- Record: 23–2 (.920)
- Place: Division: 1st (North)
- Playoff finish: Division Semifinals (lost vs. Manila, 1–2)

Bataan Risers seasons

The 2018–19 Bataan Risers season was the second season of the franchise in the Maharlika Pilipinas Basketball League (MPBL). The team finished with a league-best 23–2 record, but lost in the Division Semifinals to the Manila Stars in three games.

Bataan was able to improve from their 2–7 record in the previous season with their sixth win against the Makati Skyscrapers on September 1, surpassing their previous campaign in win percentage. On November 27, they clinched their first ever winning season with their 13th win against the Caloocan Supremos. Both wins were part of the team's 14-game winning streak. By the end of the regular season, the Bataan Risers finished 23–2, only losing to Manila and San Juan during the season. With a .920 winning percentage, they hold the highest such in the league's semi-professional era.

The Risers entered the playoffs with the league's best record at the first seed in the North Division. They first swept Caloocan in the Division Quarterfinals before stumbling upon Manila in the Division Semifinals. After winning game 1, Bataan would lose the next two games, ending their campaign. As of 2023, the 2018–19 Bataan Risers are currently the only first-seeded team to have not won a championship.

The Risers played all of their home games this season at the Bataan People's Center in Balanga.

== Regular season ==
=== Standings ===
Pos	Team	Pld	W	L	PCT	GB	Qualification
1	Bataan Risers	25	23	2	.920	—	Playoffs
2	Makati Super Crunch	25	21	4	.840	2	Playoffs
3	San Juan Knights	25	20	5	.800 (Note: San Juan wins tiebreaker over Manila by head-to-head victory.)	3	Playoffs
4	Manila Stars	25	20	5	.800	3	Playoffs
5	Bulacan Kuyas	25	14	11	.560	9	Playoffs

Source: Standings
Rules for classification: 1) Wins; 2a) If two teams are tied, head-to-head match-up; 2b) If three or more teams are tied, head-to-head point quotient; 3) overall point quotient; 4) coin toss.

=== Schedule ===
2018–19 Bataan Risers season schedule
Game	Date	Opponent	Score	Location	Record	Recap
1	June 16	Manila	L 82–89	San Andres Sports Complex	0–1	
2	June 27	Batangas City	W 81–67	Bataan People's Center	1–1	
3	July 6	Davao Occidental	W 91–88	Navotas Sports Complex	2–1	
4	July 18	General Santos	W 62–58	Bataan People's Center	3–1	
5	July 28	Imus	W 95–85	Navotas Sports Complex	4–1	
6	August 8	Quezon City	W 101–68	Blue Eagle Gym	5–1	
7	September 1	Makati	W 72–70	Lagao Gymnasium	6–1	
8	September 12	Valenzuela	W 59–55	Bataan People's Center	7–1	
9	September 22	Cebu City	W 76–69	Ynares Sports Arena	8–1	
10	October 4	Pampanga	W 87–74	Valenzuela Astrodome	9–1	
11	October 23	Bulacan	W 63–49	Bataan People's Center	10–1	
12	November 3	Pasay	W 77–60	Bataan People's Center	11–1	
13	November 12	Basilan	W 108–77	Angeles University Foundation	12–1	
14	November 27	Caloocan	W 94–81	Batangas City Coliseum	13–1	
15	December 4	Bacoor City	W 84–75	Strike Gymnasium	14–1	
16	December 10	San Juan	L 67–61	Bataan People's Center	14–2	
17	December 20	Rizal	W 88–74	Blue Eagle Gym	15–2	
18	January 7	Zamboanga	W 76–74	Bataan People's Center	16–2	
19	January 16	Navotas	W 84–78	Bataan People's Center	17–2	
20	January 28	Laguna	W 77–70	Alonte Sports Arena	18–2	
21	February 4	Muntinlupa	W 67–63	Bataan People's Center	19–2	
22	February 12	Mandaluyong	W 109–65	Valenzuela Astrodome	20–2	
23	February 18	Marikina	W 81–64	Marist School	21–2	
24	February 28	Parañaque	W 102–73	Bataan People's Center	22–2	
25	March 7	Pasig	W 105–87	Navotas Sports Complex	23–2	
Source: Schedule

== Playoffs ==
=== Schedule ===
2019 Bataan Risers playoffs schedule
Round	Game	Date	Opponent	Score	Location	Series	Recap
Division Quarterfinals	1	March 12	Caloocan	W 91–71	Bataan People's Center	1–0	
Division Quarterfinals	2	March 20	Caloocan	W 83–71	San Andres Sports Complex	2–0	
Division Semifinals	1	March 26	Manila	W 73–72	Bataan People's Center	1–0	
Division Semifinals	2	March 28	Manila	L 76–80	Filoil Flying V Centre	1–1	
Division Semifinals	3	April 1	Manila	L 51–56	Bataan People's Center	1–2	
Source: Schedule
