= 2018–19 Caloocan Supremos season =

- Head coach: John Kallos

Results
- Record: 11–14 (.440)
- Place: Division: 8th (North)
- Playoff finish: Division Quarterfinals (lost vs. Bataan, 0–2)

Caloocan Supremos seasons

The 2018–19 Caloocan Supremos season was the second season of the franchise in the Maharlika Pilipinas Basketball League (MPBL).

Caloocan improved from their one-win season in win percentage with their third win against the GenSan Warriors. After going 4–12 in their first sixteen games, the team would win seven of the remaining nine games, finishing the regular season with an 11–14 record. This includes a win against Pampanga Lanterns, which helped the team clinch the final playoff spot as both teams were tied for 8th. They would lose in the Division Quarterfinals to the Bataan Risers in two games.

== Regular season ==
=== Standings ===
Pos	Team	Pld	W	L	PCT	GB	Qualification
6	Navotas Clutch	25	12	13	.480 (Note: Navotas wins tiebreaker over Quezon City by head-to-head victory.)	11	Playoffs
7	Quezon City Capitals	25	12	13	.480	11	Playoffs
8	Caloocan Supremos	25	11	14	.440 (Note: Caloocan wins tiebreaker over Pampanga by head-to-head victory.)	12	Playoffs
9	Pampanga Lanterns	25	11	14	.440	12	
10	Valenzuela Classic	25	10	15	.400	13	

Source: Standings
Rules for classification: 1) Wins; 2a) If two teams are tied, head-to-head match-up; 2b) If three or more teams are tied, head-to-head point quotient; 3) overall point quotient; 4) coin toss.

=== Schedule ===
2018–19 Caloocan Supremos season schedule
Game	Date	Opponent	Score	Location	Record	Recap
1	June 13	Pasig	W 91–81	Caloocan Sports Complex	1–0	
2	June 27	Navotas	L 55–59	Bataan People's Center	1–1	
3	July 10	Rizal	W 92–80	Batangas City Coliseum	2–1	
4	July 21	San Juan	L 77–81	Caloocan Sports Complex	2–2	
5	August 2	Bacoor City	L 68–86	Strike Gymnasium	2–3	
6	August 15	Parañaque	L 87–94	Olivarez College	2–4	
7	August 28	Basilan	L 84–92	Bulacan Capitol Gymnasium	2–5	
8	September 11	Manila	L 68–95	Ynares Center	2–6	
9	September 20	Batangas City	L 69–81	Batangas City Coliseum	2–7	
10	September 29	Davao Occidental	L 68–82	Caloocan Sports Complex	2–8	
11	October 11	General Santos	W 84–75	José Rizal University	3–8	
12	October 24	Imus	W 74–69	Imus City Sports Complex	4–8	
13	November 5	Quezon City	L 79–81	Caloocan Sports Complex	4–9	
14	November 15	Zamboanga	L 67–72	Strike Gymnasium	4–10	
15	November 27	Bataan	L 81–94	Batangas City Coliseum	4–11	
16	December 3	Makati	L 57–79	Ynares Sports Arena	4–12	
17	December 12	Pampanga	W 78–62	Caloocan Sports Complex	5–12	
18	December 18	Cebu City	L 70–71	Rizal Memorial College	5–13	
19	December 22	Valenzuela	W 90–87	Bulacan Capitol Gymnasium	6–13	
20	January 10	Pasay	W 85–63	Caloocan Sports Complex	7–13	
21	January 17	Mandaluyong	W 83–77	Caloocan Sports Complex	8–13	
22	January 24	Bulacan	L 82–86	Strike Gymnasium	8–14	
23	January 31	Marikina	W 94–91	Caloocan Sports Complex	9–14	
24	February 11	Laguna	W 76–62	Caloocan Sports Complex	10–14	
25	February 16	Muntinlupa	W 79–72	Strike Gymnasium	11–14	
Source: Schedule

== Playoffs ==
=== Schedule ===
2019 Caloocan Supremos playoffs schedule
Round	Game	Date	Opponent	Score	Location	Series	Recap
Division Quarterfinals	1	March 12	Bataan	L 71–91	Bataan People's Center	0–1	
Division Quarterfinals	2	March 20	Bataan	L 71–83	San Andres Sports Complex	0–2	
Source: Schedule
