= 2018–19 Navotas Clutch season =

- Head coach: Richie Ticzon; Gabby Severino

Results
- Record: 13–12 (.520)
- Place: Division: 6th (North)
- Playoff finish: Division Quarterfinals (lost vs. San Juan, 0–2)

Navotas Clutch seasons

The 2018–19 Navotas Clutch season was the second season of the franchise in the Maharlika Pilipinas Basketball League (MPBL).

The Clutch finished the regular season as the sixth seed in the North Division, the same position as they were in the previous season. In the Division Quarterfinals, they would be swept by the eventual champion San Juan Knights.

== Regular season ==
=== Standings ===
| Pos | Team | Pld | W | L | PCT | GB | Qualification |
|---|---|---|---|---|---|---|---|
| 4 | Manila Stars | 25 | 20 | 5 | .800 (Note: San Juan wins tiebreaker over Manila by head-to-head victory.) | 3 | Playoffs |
| 5 | Bulacan Kuyas | 25 | 14 | 11 | .560 | 9 | Playoffs |
| 6 | Navotas Clutch | 25 | 12 | 13 | .480 (Note: Navotas wins tiebreaker over Quezon City by head-to-head victory.) | 11 | Playoffs |
| 7 | Quezon City Capitals | 25 | 12 | 13 | .480 | 11 | Playoffs |
| 8 | Caloocan Supremos | 25 | 11 | 14 | .440 (Note: Caloocan wins tiebreaker over Pampanga by head-to-head victory.) | 12 | Playoffs |

Source: Standings
Rules for classification: 1) Wins; 2a) If two teams are tied, head-to-head match-up; 2b) If three or more teams are tied, head-to-head point quotient; 3) overall point quotient; 4) coin toss.

=== Schedule ===
2018–19 Navotas Clutch season schedule
| Game | Date | Opponent | Score | Location | Record | Recap |
|---|---|---|---|---|---|---|
| 1 | June 16 | Pasay | W 83–75 | San Andres Sports Complex | 1–0 | |
| 2 | June 27 | Caloocan | W 59–55 | Bataan People's Center | 2–0 | |
| 3 | July 6 | Laguna | L 61–74 | Navotas Sports Complex | 2–1 | |
| 4 | July 18 | Mandaluyong | L 55–59 | Bataan People's Center | 2–2 | |
| 5 | August 8 | Zamboanga | L 78–89 | Blue Eagle Gym | 2–3 | |
| 6 | August 21 | Pasig | W 97–70 | Pasig Sports Center | 3–3 | |
| 7 | August 29 | Marikina | L 76–80 | San Andres Sports Complex | 3–4 | |
| 8 | September 11 | Rizal | W 87–81 | Ynares Center | 4–4 | |
| 9 | September 25 | San Juan | L 74–81 | Strike Gymnasium | 4–5 | |
| 10 | October 3 | Bacoor City | L 75–81 | Strike Gymnasium | 4–6 | |
| 11 | October 17 | Parañaque | W 90–83 | Angeles University Foundation | 5–6 | |
| 12 | October 31 | Pampanga | L 88–89 | Alonte Sports Arena | 5–7 | |
| 13 | November 10 | Davao Occidental | L 59–72 | Filoil Flying V Centre | 5–8 | |
| 14 | November 21 | Imus | L 78–79 | Filoil Flying V Centre | 5–9 | |
| 15 | December 1 | Valenzuela | W 72–70 | Alonte Sports Arena | 6–9 | |
| 16 | December 8 | Cebu City | W 83–73 | San Andres Sports Complex | 7–9 | |
| 17 | December 15 | General Santos | L 73–80 | Lagao Gymnasium | 7–10 | |
| 18 | January 5 | Bulacan | W 98–89 | Bulacan Capitol Gymnasium | 8–10 | |
| 19 | January 16 | Bataan | L 78–84 | Bataan People's Center | 8–11 | |
| 20 | January 22 | Batangas City | W 101–98 (2OT) | San Andres Sports Complex | 9–11 | |
| 21 | January 30 | Basilan | W 102–97 | Navotas Sports Complex | 10–11 | |
| 22 | February 6 | Makati | L 87–96 | Navotas Sports Complex | 10–12 | |
| 23 | February 19 | Manila | W 96–92 | San Andres Sports Complex | 11–12 | |
| 24 | March 7 | Quezon City | W 120–105 | Navotas Sports Complex | 12–12 | |
| 25 | March 9 (Note: Originally played on July 29, the game was suspended at 95–98 due to a broken rim. Play continued on March 9 and concluded with a score of 95–101.) | Muntinlupa | L 95–101 | Navotas Sports Complex | 12–13 | |
Source: Schedule

== Playoffs ==
=== Schedule ===
2019 Navotas Clutch playoffs schedule
| Round | Game | Date | Opponent | Score | Location | Series | Recap |
|---|---|---|---|---|---|---|---|
| Division Quarterfinals | 1 | March 13 | San Juan | L 76–81 | Ynares Sports Arena | 0–1 | |
| Division Quarterfinals | 2 | March 18 | San Juan | L 69–75 | Filoil Flying V Centre | 0–2 | |
Source: Schedule
