= 2018–19 Zamboanga Family's Brand Sardines season =

- Head coach: Ednie Morones; Raymund Valenzona

Results
- Record: 12–13 (.480)
- Place: Division: 6th (South)
- Playoff finish: Division semifinals (lost vs. Batangas City, 1–2)

Zamboanga Family's Brand Sardines seasons

The 2018–19 Zamboanga Family's Brand Sardines season was the inaugural season of the franchise in the Maharlika Pilipinas Basketball League (MPBL).

Initially under the Zamboanga Valientes banner, the team ended the 2018 calendar year with a 7–10 record. After the relaunch as the Zamboanga Family's Brand Sardines, the team would improve to a 12–13 record, claiming the South Division's sixth seed. Their division quarterfinals opponent was the third-seeded Muntinlupa Cagers, where despite losing the first game of the series, would win the next two to accomplish an upset win and advance to the division semifinals against the defending champion Batangas City Athletics. They would win the first game, but lost the next two games in opposing grounds.

== Regular season ==
=== Standings ===
Pos	Team	Pld	W	L	PCT	GB	Qualification
4	GenSan Warriors	25	14	11	.560	6	Playoffs
5	Bacoor City Strikers	25	13	12	.520	7	Playoffs
6	Zamboanga Family's Brand Sardines	25	12	13	.480	8	Playoffs
7	Imus Bandera	25	11	14	.440 (Note: Imus wins tiebreaker over Cebu City by head-to-head victory.)	9	Playoffs
8	Cebu City Sharks	25	11	14	.440	9	Playoffs

Source: Standings
Rules for classification: 1) Wins; 2a) If two teams are tied, head-to-head match-up; 2b) If three or more teams are tied, head-to-head point quotient; 3) overall point quotient; 4) coin toss.

=== Schedule ===
2018–19 Zamboanga Family's Brand Sardines season schedule
Game	Date	Opponent	Score	Location	Record	Recap
1	June 14	Laguna	W 86–80	Alonte Sports Arena	1–0	
2	June 23	Mandaluyong	L 61–71	Imus City Sports Complex	1–1	
3	July 4	Muntinlupa	L 69–85	Marist School	1–2	
4	July 16	Marikina	W 87–80	Angeles University Foundation	2–2	
5	July 26	Pasig	W 92–78	Pasig Sports Center	3–2	
6	August 8	Navotas	W 89–78	Blue Eagle Gym	4–2	
7	August 21	Rizal	L 73–77	Pasig Sports Center	4–3	
8	September 5	San Juan	L 59–80	Filoil Flying V Centre	4–4	
9	September 29	Parañaque	L 58–68	Caloocan Sports Complex	4–5	
10	October 6	Basilan	W 94–80	University of San Jose–Recoletos	5–5	
11	October 27	Manila	L 59–60	Mayor Vitaliano D. Agan Coliseum	5–6	
12	November 7	Makati	L 65–77	Ynares Center	5–7	
13	November 15	Caloocan	W 72–67	Strike Gymnasium	6–7	
14	November 20	Davao Occidental	L 68–93	Valenzuela Astrodome	6–8	
15	November 27	Batangas City	L 93–104	Batangas City Coliseum	6–9	
16	December 8	Quezon City	L 81–109	San Andres Sports Complex	6–10	
17	December 22	Bulacan	W 75–72	Bulacan Capitol Gymnasium	7–10	
18	January 7	Bataan	L 74–76	Bataan People's Center	7–11	
19	January 17	Valenzuela	W 79–71	Caloocan Sports Complex	8–11	
20	January 30	General Santos	L 69–78	Navotas Sports Complex	8–12	
21	February 5	Pasay	W 91–74	Cuneta Astrodome	9–12	
22	February 18	Cebu City	W 61–58	Marist School	10–12	
23	February 23	Bacoor City	W 72–63	Mayor Vitaliano D. Agan Coliseum	11–12	
24	March 4	Imus	W 83–78	Strike Gymnasium	12–12	
25	March 9	Pampanga	L 85–87	Angeles University Foundation	12–13	
Source: Schedule

== Playoffs ==
=== Schedule ===
2019 Zamboanga Family's Brand Sardines playoffs schedule
Round	Game	Date	Opponent	Score	Location	Series	Recap
Division quarterfinals	1	March 19	Muntinlupa	L 78–89	Batangas City Coliseum	0–1	
Division quarterfinals	2	March 21	Muntinlupa	W 84–73	Muntinlupa Sports Complex	1–1	
Division quarterfinals	3	March 25	Muntinlupa	W 87–83	Batangas City Coliseum	2–1	
Division semifinals	1	March 27	Batangas City	W 72–58	Rizal Memorial Colleges	1–0	
Division semifinals	2	March 30	Batangas City	L 57–67	Batangas City Coliseum	1–1	
Division semifinals	3	April 2	Batangas City	L 72–80	Batangas City Coliseum	1–2	
Source: Schedule

== Split from the Valientes ==
In December 2018, the team management announced that they would be splitting from the Zamboanga Valientes at the start of the 2019 calendar year, essentially making the MPBL side independent. According to operations head Nini Arquiza, undisclosed management issues is what caused the reshuffling and that the former management wanted the team to "go for the championship". The team would later be relaunched as the Zamboanga Family's Brand Sardines.

In the aftermath, the new franchise would make the playoffs in every season since the relaunch, even making the 2022 national finals, where they would lose to the Nueva Ecija Rice Vanguards in four games. The Valientes continued to compete in other leagues such as the PBA 3x3 and the ASEAN Basketball League. In 2023, the Valientes would win in the Pilipinas VisMin Super Cup's Open Championship.
