= Gab Banal =

Filipino basketball player (born 1990)

No. 77 – Quezon Huskers
- Position: Small forward / power forward
- League: MPBL

Personal information
- Born: September 9, 1990 (age 36)
- Listed height: 6 ft 3 in (1.91 m)
- Listed weight: 200 lb (91 kg)

Career information
- High school: Xavier School (San Juan)
- College: De La Salle; Mapua
- PBA draft: 2014: 2nd round, 22nd overall pick
- Drafted by: San Miguel Beermen
- Playing career: 2015–present

Career history
- 2015–2017: GlobalPort Batang Pier
- 2018–2020: Bacoor City Strikers
- 2021: Alaska Aces
- 2021–2022: TNT Tropang Giga
- 2022–2024: Blackwater Bossing
- 2024–present: Quezon Huskers

Career highlights
- MPBL Most Valuable Player (2019); 2× MPBL All-Star (2019, 2020); All-MPBL First Team (2019); All-MPBL Second Team (2020); PBA D-League champion (2018); PBA D-League Finals MVP (2018)

Gabriel Banal (born September 9, 1990) is a Filipino professional basketball player for the Quezon Huskers of the Maharlika Pilipinas Basketball League (MPBL). He was drafted 22nd overall pick in the 2nd round of the 2014 PBA Draft. After spending time with the GlobalPort Batang Pier, he played in the PBA D-League, the MPBL and the Chooks-to-Go Pilipinas 3x3 league before returning to the PBA in 2021. He is the son of former basketball player and coach Joel Banal.

== College career ==
After finishing high school at Xavier School in 2008 and winning a title with Jeric Teng in the now defunct Tiong Lian Basketball Association, Banal played for two years with the De La Salle Green Archers.

Banal was then recruited by Chito Victolero to join the Mapúa Cardinals. He was initially suspended due to residency issues. The NCAA then allowed him to play, where he established himself as a solid small forward with averages of 7.8 points, 5.9 rebounds, and three assists in 25.3 minutes per game.

In 2013, Banal returned to DLSU, not to play for the Archers, but to finish his information systems degree.

== Amateur career ==
=== Cebuana Lhuillier Gems ===
In 2013, Banal played in the PBA D-League where he first played for the Cebuana Lhuillier Gems. In 2014, they reached the semifinals of the Foundation Cup, where they were defeated by the NLEX Road Warriors. He also played for the Tanduay Light Rhum Masters that year.

=== Flying V Thunder ===
In 2017, Banal joined the Flying V Thunder for that year's Foundation Cup. In his debut, he had 11 points, eight rebounds, and three assists in a win over the Cignal HD Hawkeyes. In their third game, he had 29 points, 11 rebounds, and four assists as they got their third straight win of the conference. He then got 12 points in a win over the Marinerong Pilipino Skippers, which was coached by his father and his uncle. In a win over Racal Motors Alibaba, he had 17 points (with 11 coming in the fourth quarter), six rebounds, and two steals. They got into the playoffs with a win over the CEU Scorpions, in which he had 11 points, seven rebounds, and seven assists. They went on to secure the top seed, but they lost to CEU in an upset in the semis.

=== Marinerong Pilipino Skippers ===
In the 2018 D-League Aspirants' Cup, Banal played for Marinerong Pilipino, with his father as team consultant and his uncle as head coach. In his first game, he had 14 points, 14 rebounds, six assists, and four steals as they got their first win of the conference. He then had 17 points, nine rebounds, and four steals in a win over the EAC Generals, followed by 20 points, 14 rebounds, and four assists in their next win. Marinerong Pilipino got to the semis, where they lost to Zark's Burger-Lyceum.

=== Go For Gold Scratchers ===
Banal went on to play for the Go For Gold Scratchers. In a close win over the AMA Online Education Titans, he scored his team's last six points and finished with 28 points, 15 rebounds, four assists, and two blocks. He then followed up that performance with 21 points, 10 rebounds, three assists, and two blocks. In a matchup against his former team in Marinerong Pilipino, he scored 24 points, five rebounds, three assists, and three steals as they got their fourth straight win. Their streak was broken in a loss to the Che'Lu Revellers. Go for Gold then got into the Finals as he completed a triple-double with 24 points, 19 rebounds and 10 assists against Marinerong Pilipino. After winning the 2018 PBA D-League Foundation Cup Finals in five games, he was given the Finals MVP award. He and CJ Perez were the first players to receive this award. He dedicated the award to his father, who suffered a heart attack two days before Game 5.

=== Return to Marinerong Pilipino ===
Banal returned to Marinerong Pilipino for their final games as they were trying to make one last run at the playoffs. With him, the Skippers were able to win their last two games. However, it wasn't enough, as they were eliminated by the Chadao-FEU Tamaraws, who had one more win than Marinerong Pilipino.

=== Return to Go For Gold ===
Soon after the Skippers were eliminated, Banal was brought back to Go For Gold from the free agent pool for the playoffs where they faced CEU. He was able to extend the series to a do-or-die game with a game-winning triple. He then dropped 18 points, six boards and six assists in the do-or-die game but they still lost, despite CEU going down to a seven-man rotation due to most of its players being dropped from the team for game-fixing.

== Professional career ==
=== Barako Bull ===
In 2014, he and his cousins Jonathan Banal and Frank Golla applied for the 2014 PBA Draft. Shortly after he got drafted by the San Miguel Beermen, he was traded to the Barako Bull Energy along with Jojo Duncil, Chico Lañete and a 2016 first-round pick (Jeoffrey Javillonar was later selected), for the draft rights of third pick Ronald Pascual. However, he was not signed by Barako.

=== GlobalPort Batang Pier ===
In 2016, Banal played for Mighty Sports in various tournaments. He then played for GlobalPort Batang Pier, averaging limited minutes. He did get to play against his brother Ael during the 2016–17 Philippine Cup, making them the first second generation brothers to play in the league. Several weeks later, GlobalPort released him.

=== Bacoor City Strikers ===
Banal then played for the Bacoor City Strikers of the Maharlika Pilipinas Basketball League, beginning in the Rajah Cup. Before the following season, he spent time in the PBA D-League and with the iECO Green Warriors, a team that represented the Philippines in the Asia League's Terrific 12 tournament. After the 2018–19 MPBL Datu Cup, he received the honors of being the MVP for that season as he led them to the semifinals and averaged 18.2 points, 8.9 rebounds, and 6.4 assists. He also made the All-MPBL First Team that season.

In 2019, Banal also played for Bacoor's 3x3 team in the Chooks-to-Go Pilipinas 3x3 league. He made his 3x3 debut in the second leg of the President's Cup. In the Lakan Cup, he helped Bacoor get its third straight win of the season with clutch triples and finished the game with 17 points, six rebounds, and four assists. He then had a double-double of 10 points and 11 rebounds in a blowout win over the Zamboanga Family's Brand Sardines. In a win over the Rizal Golden Coolers, he led the team with 16 points. He then put together one of his best performances in an overtime win over Bacolod Master Sardines with 29 points (10 scored in overtime), 11 assists and seven rebounds. Bacoor then went on a winning streak, which included a win over the Biñan City Heroes in which he had 21 points and eight rebounds. Their winning streak got to seven games, with him scoring 21 points in Bacoor's seventh straight win. He then missed Bacoor's next three games due to dengue and in that span, Bacoor lost two straight before getting a win over the Cebu Sharks.

Against the Makati Super Crunch, Banal almost put up another triple-double with 11 points, 14 rebounds, and eight assists. In Bacoor's sixth straight win, he got a triple-double with 11 points, 12 rebounds, and 10 assists. He almost got another triple-double the following game with 10 points, 11 assists, and seven rebounds, but they still managed to win their seventh straight game. He then had to miss a game as he was with the Mighty Sports team that won the Dubai Invitational Tournament. In the game that he missed, Bacoor lost to the Manila Stars. Bacoor ended the elimination rounds at second in their division. He was an All-Star that season, and played a major role in the South All-Stars' win over the North.

In the Game 1 of the quarterfinals against the GenSan Warriors, Banal led his team to the win with 20 points, 11 assists, three rebounds, and two steals. They were able to move on to the semifinals with a win in the following game. In Game 1 of the semifinals against Basilan Steel, he injured his knee and couldn't finish the game. Bacoor won Game 2 without him, but were eliminated in Game 3. For his performance that season, he was awarded a spot on the All-MPBL Second Team.

=== Alaska Aces ===
Banal then returned to the Philippine Basketball Association, signing a one conference deal with the Alaska Aces. In his debut for Alaska during the 2021 Philippine Cup, he had eight points, six rebounds, three assists, and a block in 22 minutes as he led Alaska's bench unit to a win over Blackwater. He then led the team with 17 points in a loss to the Phoenix Super LPG Fuel Masters, and 20 points in a loss to the Meralco Bolts. At the end of the conference, he led the league in three-point field goal percentage. Alaska gave him a one conference extension which he rejected.

=== TNT Tropang Giga ===
After securing his release from the Aces, Banal signed a two-year deal with the TNT Tropang Giga. In his first conference with TNT, the 2021 Governors' Cup, he had impressive scoring outputs and averaged 15.7 minutes per game. The following conference however, his minutes went down to 5.6 per game as he logged more DNPs (Did Not Play - Coach's Decision) than games played.

=== Blackwater Bossing ===
On September 19, 2022, Banal was traded to the Blackwater Bossing in a three-team trade involving Blackwater, TNT, and the NLEX Road Warriors. He made his debut during the 2022–23 Commissioner's Cup, in which he missed all his shots in 17 minutes in a loss to the Bay Area Dragons. He bounced back the following game and contributed 10 points, five rebounds, and both career-high tying 5 assists and 4 steals in a win over Phoenix. In a Governors' Cup game against the Batang Pier, he scored 19 points off the bench.

=== Quezon Huskers ===
On February 1, 2024, it was announced that Banal would return to the Maharlika Pilipinas Basketball League, this time with the Quezon Huskers.

== Career statistics ==
Legend
GP	Games played	MPG	Minutes per game
FG%	Field-goal percentage	3P%	3-point field-goal percentage	FT%	Free-throw percentage
RPG	Rebounds per game	APG	Assists per game	SPG	Steals per game
BPG	Blocks per game	PPG	Points per game	**Bold**	Career high

As of the end of 2023–24 season

=== PBA ===
Year	Team	GP	MPG	FG%	3P%	FT%	RPG	APG	SPG	BPG	PPG
2015–16	GlobalPort	2	14.0	.333	.500	—	1.0	—	—	—	3.0
2016–17	GlobalPort	2	5.6	.333	.000	.000	.5	—	.5	—	1.0
2021	Alaska	21	**18.5**	.451	.466	.615	**2.6**	1.4	**.8**	.1	**7.6**
2021	TNT	21	**18.5**	.451	.466	.615	**2.6**	1.4	**.8**	.1	**7.6**
2022–23	TNT	**33**	17.5	.350	.306	**.810**	2.1	**1.6**	.5	**.2**	4.2
2022–23	Blackwater	**33**	17.5	.350	.306	**.810**	2.1	**1.6**	.5	**.2**	4.2
2023–24	Blackwater	7	11.2	**.462**	**.556**	.667	1.7	.7	.3	.1	2.7
Career		65	16.7	.398	.396	.686	2.1	1.4	.6	.1	5.0

=== MPBL ===
Legend
GP	Games played	GS	Games started	MPG	Minutes per game
FG%	Field-goal percentage	3P%	3-point field-goal percentage	FT%	Free-throw percentage
RPG	Rebounds per game	APG	Assists per game	SPG	Steals per game
BPG	Blocks per game	PPG	Points per game	**Bold**	Career high

Year	Team	GP	GS	MPG	FG%	3P%	FT%	RPG	APG	SPG	BPG	PPG
2018–19	Bacoor City	27	**24**	**33.1**	**.385**	.272	**.732**	**8.9**	**6.4**	0.9	**0.6**	**18.2**
2019–20	Bacoor City	**28**	23	27.1	.372	**.304**	.692	5.9	5.9	**1.0**	0.3	13.9
Source: Gab Banal via Genius Sports (MPBL)

=== NCAA ===
Year	Team	GP	MPG	FG%	3P%	FT%	RPG	APG	SPG	BPG	PPG
2012–13	Mapúa	14	25.3	.270	.220	.638	5.9	3.0	.5	.1	7.8

== National team career ==
In 2008, Banal was recruited by Franz Pumaren to play on the national under-18 team. Playing alongside RR Garcia and Ian Sangalang, they won the 2008 SEABA Under-18 championship and placed fourth in that year's FIBA Asia U-18 championship.

In 2017, Banal got to practice with the Philippine team that would compete in the 2017 FIBA Asia Champions Cup. He would eventually be placed on the reserves list. In 2020, he was a part of the national pool for the Philippine 3x3 team that competed at the FIBA 3x3 Olympic Qualifying Tournament (OQT). In 2022, he was set to play against South Korea, but when they pulled out of the qualifying window, he didn't get to play.

== Personal life ==
Banal comes from a basketball family. He is the third youngest son in the family, with his older brothers Juan and Miguel playing for Ateneo's Team B in college. The fourth youngest son, Raphael, played for the national under-18 team in 2010. Their father, Joel Banal, is a former PBA player and champion coach with Talk 'N Text, and Joel's brother Koy is also a former head coach with Barako Bull and the Phoenix Fuel Masters. Their cousin Jonathan played five seasons at Mapúa, while another cousin, Frank Golla, played on four UAAP title teams with the Ateneo Blue Eagles.
