= North Division (MPBL) =

Division of the Maharlika Pilipinas Basketball League

- League: Maharlika Pilipinas Basketball League
- Sport: Basketball
- Founded: 2018
- No. of teams: 14
- Most recent champions: Abra Weavers (1st title)
- Most titles: Pampanga Giant Lanterns; San Juan Knights (2 titles each)

The North Division is one of two divisions in the Maharlika Pilipinas Basketball League (MPBL), the other being the South Division. Both divisions were formed as a result of the league's national expansion in the 2018–19 season. As of 2026, the North Division consists of 14 teams.

The most recent realignment occurred in the 2026 season. The Nueva Ecija Rice Vanguards, Pampanga Giant Lanterns and Pangasinan Heatwaves all departed. The Meycauayan Marilao Gems, which relocated from Muntinlupa, were realigned to the North and so do the Parañaque Patriots to even the divisions.

== 2026 standings ==
Pos	Team	Pld	W	L	GB
1	Caloocan Batang Kankaloo	15	14	1	—
2	Abra Weavers	12	11	1	1.5
3	San Juan Knights	11	10	1	2
4	Meycauayan Marilao Gems	13	8 (Note: Meycauayan Marilao (1.069) wins tiebreaker over Ilagan Isabela (1.019) based on overall point quotient.)	5	5
5	Ilagan Isabela Cowboys	13	8	5	5
6	Pasay Voyagers	14	8	6	5.5
7	Pasig City	11	7	4	5
8	Quezon City Black Bulls	13	7	6	6
9	Valenzuela City Darkhorse	14	7	7	6.5
10	Bataan Risers	13	5	8	8
11	Marikina Shoemasters	14	5	9	8.5
12	Bulacan Kuyas	13	4	9	9
13	Manila Batang Quiapo	14	2	12	11.5
14	Parañaque Patriots	15	1	14	13

Updated to match(es) played on June 23, 2026. Source: Standings
Rules for classification: 1) Wins; 2a) If two teams are tied, head-to-head match-up; 2b) If three or more teams are tied, head-to-head point quotient; 3) overall point quotient; 4) coin toss.

== Teams ==
=== Current ===
Team	Location	Years in division
Abra Weavers	Bangued, Abra	2024–present
Bataan Risers	Orion, Bataan	2018–present
Bulacan Kuyas	Baliwag, Bulacan	2018–2020; 2023–present
Caloocan Batang Kankaloo	Caloocan	2018–present
Ilagan Isabela Cowboys	Ilagan, Isabela	2025–present
Manila Batang Quiapo	Manila	2018–present
Meycauayan Marilao Gems	Meycauayan, Bulacan; Marilao, Bulacan	2026–present
Marikina Shoemasters	Marikina	2019–present
Parañaque Patriots	Parañaque	2019–2020; 2023; 2026–present
Pasay Voyagers	Pasay	2018–2020; 2023–present
Pasig City MPBL team	Pasig	2018–2023; 2025–present
Quezon City Black Bulls	Quezon City	2018–present
San Juan Knights	San Juan	2018–present
Valenzuela City Darkhorse	Valenzuela	2018–present

=== Former ===
Team	Location	Years in division	Current division
Makati Skyscrapers	Makati	2018–2023	Inactive
Mandaluyong El Tigre	Mandaluyong	2018–2019	Inactive
Navotas Clutch	Navotas	2018–2020	Inactive
Nueva Ecija Rice Vanguards	Palayan, Nueva Ecija	2019–2025	Inactive
Pampanga Giant Lanterns	San Fernando, Pampanga	2018–2025	Inactive
Pangasinan Heatwaves	Rosales, Pangasinan	2024–2025	Inactive
Rizal Golden Coolers	Antipolo, Rizal	2019–2020; 2023–2024	South Division
Tarlac United Force	Tarlac City, Tarlac	2024 (Note: The Tarlac United Force withdrew before their first game of the 2024 season due to not being able to fulfill the league's financial obligations to join the following season.)	Inactive

=== Timeline ===
Denotes team that is currently in the division
Denotes team that has left the division
Denotes period in which the team is/was in the opposing division

== North Division finals history ==
Numbers in parentheses indicate the number of times that team has appeared in the North Division finals, as well as each respective teams' North Division finals record up to date.

Won MPBL finals

Season	Champion	Series	Runner-up
2018–19; Datu Cup	San Juan (1, 1–0)	2–1	Manila (1, 0–1)
2019–20; Lakan Season	San Juan (2, 2–0)	2–1	Makati (1, 0–1)
2022	Nueva Ecija (1, 1–0)	2–1	San Juan (3, 2–1)
2023	Pampanga (1, 1–0)	2–0	San Juan (4, 2–2)
2024	Pampanga (2, 2–0)	2–0	San Juan (5, 2–3)
2025	Abra (1, 1–0)	3–0	Pangasinan (1, 0–1)

== Season results ==
Legend
Won MPBL finals
Won division finals, but lost the MPBL finals
Qualified for the playoffs
Qualified for the play-in, but failed to reach playoffs

Season	Team															
Season	1st	2nd	3rd	4th	5th	6th	7th	8th	9th	10th	11th	12th	13th	14th	15th	16th
2018: The North Division was formed with thirteen member teams.
2018–19; Datu Cup	BAN (23–2)	MKT (21–4)	SJ (20–5)	MNL (20–5)	BUL (14–11)	NAV (13–12)	QC (12–13)	CAL (11–14)	PAM (11–14)	VAL (10–15)	MDL (8–17)	PSY (8–17)	PSG (4–21)	—N/a	—N/a	—N/a
2019: Expansion side Nueva Ecija was placed in the North Division while Mandaluyong departed from the league. Marikina, Parañaque, and Rizal joined from the South Division.
2019–20; Lakan Season	SJ (26–4)	MNL (25–5)	MKT (22–8)	PAM (21–9)	BAN (20–10)	BUL (19–11)	PSG (18–12)	PSY (17–13)	CAL (16–14)	VAL (11–19)	NE (10–20)	QC (10–20)	MAR (8–22)	PAR (8–22)	NAV (7–22)	RZL (6–23)
2022: Bulacan, Navotas, Parañaque, and Pasay departed from the league. Rizal was realigned back to the South Division.
2022	NE (21–0)	PSG (14–7)	SJ (14–7)	PAM (14–7)	BAN (13–8)	VAL (10–11)	QC (9–12)	MAR (8–13)	CAL (6–15)	MNL (6–15)	MKT (2–19)	—N/a	—N/a	—N/a	—N/a	—N/a
2023: Returning sides Bulacan, Parañaque, and Pasay were placed in the North Division. Rizal rejoined from the South Division.
2023	PAM (26–2)	NE (23–5)	MKT (21–7)	CAL (20–8)	PSG (19–9)	SJ (19–9)	PSY (17–11)	MAR (16–12)	BAN (13–15)	RZL (12–16)	PAR (11–17)	BUL (7–21)	MNL (4–23)	QC (3–25)	VAL (3–25)	—N/a
2024: Expansion sides Abra, Pangasinan, and Tarlac were placed in the North Division while Makati and Pasig departed from the league. Parañaque was realigned back to the South Division. Tarlac was pulled out before playing their first game of the season.
2024	SJ (26–2)	PAM (26–2)	NE (24–4)	MNL (20–8)	CAL (19–9)	PSY (18–10)	ABR (18–10)	RZL (15–13)	QC (15–13)	VAL (14–14)	PGS (12–16)	BAN (9–19)	MAR (7–21)	BUL (2–26)	TAR (WD)	—N/a
2025: Expansion side Ilagan Isabela was placed in the North Division alongside returning side Pasig. Rizal was realigned back once again to the South Division.
2025	ABR (28–1)	NE (27–2)	SJ (26–3)	CAL (21–8)	PAM (21–8)	PSY (21–8)	PGS (20–9)	ILA (15–14)	BAN (13–16)	PSG (12–17)	VAL (7–22)	QC (7–22)	MNL (4–25)	MAR (4–25)	BUL (3–26)	—N/a
2026: Nueva Ecija, Pampanga, and Pangasinan departed from the league. Relocated side Meycauayan Marilao realigned from the South Division alongside Parañaque.
