= Pasay Voyagers =

Professional basketball team in Pasay, Philippines

- 2026 Pasay Voyagers season
- League: MPBL
- Founded: 2018; 8 years ago
- History: Pasay Voyagers; 2018–present
- Arena: Cuneta Astrodome
- Location: Pasay
- Team colors
- Head coach: Marlon Martin

The Pasay Voyagers are a Filipino professional basketball team based in Pasay. The team competes in the Maharlika Pilipinas Basketball League (MPBL) as a member of the league's North Division. The team plays its home games at Cuneta Astrodome.

The team began play in the 2018–19 MPBL season. The team has also played in the Chooks-to-Go Pilipinas 3x3.

The Voyagers are one of two teams based in the Southern Manila District of Metro Manila alongside the Parañaque Patriots.

== History ==
As part of the Maharlika Pilipinas Basketball League's national expansion, the league awarded Pasay with an expansion team for the 2018–19 season. In their inaugural season, despite having eventual all-star Jaypee Belencion, the Voyagers only managed to win eight out of 25 games, tied with Mandaluyong. The team ranked 12th in the North Division. In the 2019–20 season, Pasay acquired Dhon Reverente, who would lead the Voyagers to a 17–13 record and an 8th-place finish, clinching them a playoff spot. In the playoffs, the team would be swept by the defending champion San Juan Knights. Reverente would be declared an all-star and be placed onto the All-MPBL Second Team that season.

Pasay then opted out of the 2021 Invitational and later the entire 2022 season, but would return in 2023, with both Belencion and Reverente returning to the team. In their returning season, they managed to improve on previous performance. Yet again, they faced another defending champion in the playoffs, this time being the Nueva Ecija Rice Vanguards. The team was once again swept out of the First Round.

== Home venues ==
The Cuneta Astrodome has been the Voyagers' only home venue to date. Outside of neutral-site venues, it is tied with Mayor Vitaliano D. Agan Coliseum as the highest-capacity MPBL venue.

Venue	Location	Capacity	2018–19	2019–20	2023	2024	2025
Cuneta Astrodome	Pasay	12,000	✓	✓	✓	✓	✓

== Current roster ==
Pasay Voyagers roster
Players

Pos.	No.	Name	Height	Weight	DOB	From
F	0	Gyle Montaño	6 ft 4 in (1.93 m)		2000–07–31	Lyceum
G	1	TJ Abdullah	5 ft 10 in (1.78 m)		2004–04–06	Mapúa
G	2	Bobby Mark Parks (FF)	6 ft 5 in (1.96 m)		2000–11–06	National-U
G	3	Kris Kelly Gurtiza	6 ft 1 in (1.85 m)		1999–05–12	Emilio Aguinaldo
G/F	5	Eric Joseph Pili (HG)	6 ft 3 in (1.91 m)		1998–03–05	St. Benilde
F	7	Denniel Jay Aguirre	6 ft 1 in (1.85 m)		1997–01–10	Mapúa
G	9	Darrel Manliguez	5 ft 7 in (1.70 m)		1995–04–03	MATS
G/F	10	Rence Alcoriza	6 ft 0 in (1.83 m)			Arellano
G	13	Steve Nash Enriquez	5 ft 9 in (1.75 m)		2003–02–05	National-U
G	14	Cyril Gonzales	6 ft 0 in (1.83 m)		2000–06–27	Mapúa
G	15	Dave Paolo	6 ft 0 in (1.83 m)		2000–10–23	Lyceum
G	16	Lennard Santiago	6 ft 1 in (1.85 m)		2000–11–16	National-U
F	17	Gamaliel Evangelista Jr.,	6 ft 5 in (1.96 m)		1999–04–01	UST
G	18	Nico Quinal (HG)	5 ft 9 in (1.75 m)		2002–02–27	Emilio Aguinaldo
F	23	Brian Hilario (HG)	6 ft 2 in (1.88 m)		1997–07–26	PMMS
G	24	Joshua Diño	5 ft 10 in (1.78 m)		2000–01–30	Philippine Christian
F	25	Edmund Dela Cruz	6 ft 2 in (1.88 m)		2000–10–01	National-U
F	42	Lean Martel	6 ft 4 in (1.93 m)		1998–06–27	UPHSD
C	45	Christian Fajarito	6 ft 7 in (2.01 m)		1996–01–27	Letran
F	71	John Jabonete (HG)	6 ft 4 in (1.93 m)		2000–11–04	Mapúa

Coaches

Head coach

- Marlon Martin

Assistant coach(es)

- Victor Escudero
- Joel Grasgasin
- Hubert delos Santos
- Adrian Bucal
- Bryle Orog
- Katherine Ann Tenorio

Team consultant

- Cholo Martin

Legend

- (HG) Homegrown
- (FF) Filipino-foreigner
- (EA) EASL player
- (RS) Reserve player
- (S) Suspended
- Injured

- Roster – via Genius Sports
Updated as of: June 22, 2026

=== Head coaches ===
Pasay Voyagers head coaches
#	Name	Start	End	Achievements	Ref.
1	Cholo Martin	2018	2018–19	—	
2	Marlon Martin	2019–20	current	—	

== Notable players ==
=== Individual award winners ===
MPBL Most Improved Player

- Laurenz Victoria – 2024

All-MPBL First Team

- Christian Fajarito – 2025

All-MPBL Second Team

- Dhon Reverente – 2020

=== MPBL All-Star Day ===
All-Star selections

- Jaypee Belencion – 2019
- Dhon Reverente – 2020
- Warren Bonifacio – 2024
- Laurenz Victoria – 2024

=== PBA players ===
Ex-PBA players

- Jeff Chan
- Brian Ilad

== Season-by-season records ==
Note: Statistics are correct as of the end of the 2026 MPBL season.

League champions
Division champions
Qualified for playoffs
Best regular season record

Season	League	Division	Regular season						Playoffs	
Season	League	Division	Finish	Played	Wins	Losses	Win %	GB	Round	Results
Pasay Voyagers
2018–19; Datu Cup	MPBL	North	12th	25	8	17	.320	15	Did not qualify	
2019–20; Lakan Season	MPBL	North	8th	30	17	13	.567	9	Division quarterfinals	lost vs. San Juan, 0–2
Did not participate in 2022
2023	MPBL	North	7th	28	17	11	.607	9	Division quarterfinals	lost vs. Nueva Ecija, 0–2
2024	MPBL	North	6th	28	18	10	.643	8	Division quarterfinals	lost vs. Nueva Ecija, 0–2
2025	MPBL	North	6th	29	21	8	.724	7	Division quarterfinals	lost vs. San Juan, 0–2
2026	MPBL	North	5th	25	14	11	.560	9	Division quarterfinals Division semifinals	won vs. Meycauayan Marilao, 2–1 lost vs. Abra, 0–2
Regular season record				165	95	70	.576		5 playoff appearances	
Playoff record				13	2	11	.154		0 finals appearances	
Cumulative record				178	97	81	.545		0 championships	
