= Jay-R Taganas =

Filipino basketball player (born 1987)

No. 3 – Parañaque Patriots
- Position: Power forward / Center
- League: MPBL

Personal information
- Born: September 1, 1987 (age 39) San Mateo, Isabela, Philippines
- Listed height: 6 ft 3 in (1.91 m)

Career information
- College: San Beda

Career history
- 2015–2016: Jumbo Plastic Linoleum Giants
- 2018–2020: Bulacan Kuyas
- 2021: Basilan Peace Riders / Jumbo Plastic
- 2022–2023: Nueva Ecija Capitals / Rice Vanguards
- 2024–2025: Pangasinan Heatwaves / Abono Reapers
- 2026–present: Parañaque Patriots

Career highlights
- MPBL champion (2022); 2× MPBL All-Star (2019, 2020); 3× MPBL Sportsmanship award (2019, 2022, 2023); FilBasket champion (Summer 2022); PBA D-League champion (2011 Foundation); 3× NCAA Philippines champion (2006–2008)

Jay-R Taganas (born September 1, 1987) is a Filipino professional basketball former player for the Parañaque Patriots of the Maharlika Pilipinas Basketball League (MPBL).

In his college career, Taganas played for San Beda College and has played in stints in the Pilipinas Commercial Basketball League (PCBL) and the PBA D-League. In 2011, he won a PBA D-League title with the NLEX Road Warriors, and from 2015 to 2016, he was part of the Jumbo Plastic Linoleum Giants team that won back-to-back PCBL championships.

In 2018, he joined the Bulacan Kuyas of the Maharlika Pilipinas Basketball League in its inaugural season, where he earned two all-star selections before moving to the Basilan Peace Riders of the Pilipinas VisMin Super Cup, which itself returned to the MPBL as part of the 2021 MPBL Invitational. In 2022, he would move to the Nueva Ecija Rice Vanguards franchise where he won two championships, one in FilBasket and one in the MPBL. In 2024, Jay-R joined the expansion Pangasinan Heatwaves. Taganas also won the MPBL Sportsmanship award three times.

== Career statistics ==
=== MPBL ===
Legend
GP	Games played	GS	Games started	MPG	Minutes per game
FG%	Field-goal percentage	3P%	3-point field-goal percentage	FT%	Free-throw percentage
RPG	Rebounds per game	APG	Assists per game	SPG	Steals per game
BPG	Blocks per game	PPG	Points per game	**Bold**	Career high

Year	Team	GP	GS	MPG	FG%	3P%	FT%	RPG	APG	SPG	BPG	PPG
2018	Bulacan	12	8	23.8	.494	.273	.513	10.8	3.6	0.8	**0.3**	8.6
2018–19	Bulacan	27	23	**25.8**	.547	.250	.444	**12.7**	3.3	0.7	**0.3**	**7.9**
2019–20	Bulacan	**32**	**30**	22.6	.435	.293	**.517**	10.3	**3.7**	**1.1**	0.2	5.7
2022	Nueva Ecija	31	5	13.1	**.628**	**.308**	.405	5.4	1.1	0.5	0.1	3.8
2023	Nueva Ecija	29	8	13.4	.527	.267	.321	6.0	1.1	0.5	0.1	3.1
