= Alfonzo Gotladera =

Filipino basketball player

Free agent
- Position: Center / power forward

Personal information
- Born: February 16, 1992 (age 34) San Juan City, Philippines
- Listed height: 6 ft 5 in (1.96 m)
- Listed weight: 240 lb (109 kg)

Career information
- High school: Claret School of Quezon City; San Beda (Taytay, Rizal)
- College: De La Salle (2011–2012); Ateneo (2014–2015)
- PBA draft: 2016: Special draft
- Drafted by: NLEX Road Warriors
- Playing career: 2016–present

Career history
- 2016–2018: NLEX Road Warriors
- 2019–2020: Bataan Risers
- 2020: Pasig Sta. Lucia Realtors
- 2021: San Miguel Beermen
- 2024: Valenzuela Classic

Career highlights
- PBA All-Star (2017)

Alfonzo Feliciano Gotladera (born February 16, 1992) is a Filipino professional basketball player who last played for the Valenzuela Classic of the Maharlika Pilipinas Basketball League (MPBL). He was selected by the NLEX Road Warriors in the 2016 PBA draft.

== High school career ==
In high school, Gotladera played for the San Beda Red Cubs. Together with Baser Amer and Chris Javier, they won back to back NCAA Jrs titles.

Gotladera was recruited by both Ateneo and DLSU. Eventually, he chose to play for the DLSU Green Archers.

== College career ==
=== DLSU Green Archers ===
However, Gotladera had limited minutes in his time there as he shared a frontcourt alongside Norbert Torres, Yutien Andrada, Arnold Van Opstal, and other veterans. In two seasons with DLSU, he scored a total of only two points.

=== Ateneo Blue Eagles ===
Gotladera decided to transfer from DLSU. With La Salle choosing to release him, he only had to serve one year of residency. During his residency, he spent time with Ateneo's Team B.

In one of the first games of Season 77, a match against his former team, Gotladera put up career-highs of 17 points and eight rebounds to help claim the win for Ateneo. That season, Ateneo secured the first seed and a twice-to-beat advantage. However, they lost twice in the first round to the NU Bulldogs. In his final year with Ateneo, he averaged around four points and six rebounds a game.

== Professional career ==
=== NLEX Road Warriors ===
In 2016, Gotladera and other Gilas Pilipinas players were placed in a special draft. He was selected by the NLEX Road Warriors in the 2016 PBA draft.

As a member of Gilas, Gotladera got to play as an All-Star during the 2017 All-Star Week. There were times during his time at NLEX that he was relegated to a reserve role. At the start of 2019, he was released by the team.

=== San Miguel Beermen ===
In between PBA stints, Gotladera played in the MPBL for the Pasig Sta. Lucia Realtors and the Bataan Risers. He also played in the PBA D-League for the Enderun Titans. In 2021, he was signed to a one-season deal with the San Miguel Beermen, marking a return to the PBA.

=== Valenzuela Classic ===
In 2024, Gotladera joined the Valenzuela Classic. A few months later, he was released by the team.

=== Iloilo United Royals ===
Several days after he was released from Valenzuela, Gotladera was signed by the Iloilo United Royals.

== Career statistics ==
Legend
GP	Games played	MPG	Minutes per game
FG%	Field-goal percentage	3P%	3-point field-goal percentage	FT%	Free-throw percentage
RPG	Rebounds per game	APG	Assists per game	SPG	Steals per game
BPG	Blocks per game	PPG	Points per game	**Bold**	Career high

=== PBA season-by-season averages ===
As of the end of 2021 season

Year	Team	GP	MPG	FG%	3P%	FT%	RPG	APG	SPG	BPG	PPG
2016–17	NLEX	9	**7.6**	**.467**	—	.200	1.0	.2	.1	**.1**	1.7
2017–18	NLEX	**20**	6.9	.439	.000	.500	**2.0**	**.5**	**.2**	**.1**	**1.9**
2021	San Miguel	12	3.5	.333	—	**.750**	1.0	.2	.0	.0	.6
Career		41	6.0	.435	.000	.455	1.5	.3	.1	.0	1.4

=== UAAP ===
Year	Team	GP	MPG	FG%	3P%	FT%	RPG	APG	SPG	BPG	PPG
2011–12	La Salle	8	3.8	.167	.000	.000	1.3	.0	.0	.3	.3
2012–13	La Salle	5	3.6	.000	.000	.000	1.0	.0	.0	.0	.0
2014–15	Ateneo	**16**	16.6	**.523**	.000	**.486**	5.3	.4	.2	**1.0**	**5.3**
2015–16	Ateneo	13	**17.0**	.510	.000	.412	**6.0**	**.9**	**.1**	.1	4.4
Career		42	12.7	.484	.000	.453	4.2	.4	.1	.5	3.4

== International career ==
Gotladera was first invited to play for the Philippine national team in 2010 when he was in his junior year of high school. He couldn't accept the invite due to scheduling conflicts.

He made his national team debut as part of the Gilas 5.0 team that competed in the 2016 FIBA Asia Challenge. In 2017, he played in the William Jones Cup.
