= MPBL Defensive Player of the Year award =

Annual Maharlika Pilipinas Basketball League award

The MPBL Defensive Player of the Year award is an annual Maharlika Pilipinas Basketball League award given to the player with the best defensive performance in the regular season. It was first awarded during the 2018–19 MPBL season.

As of 2025, five players have won the award, with Mark Yee being the only recipient to have won the award more than once. Yee is also the only recipient who has also won Finals Most Valuable Player. The most recent recipient was Antonio Bonsubre Jr.

== Winners ==
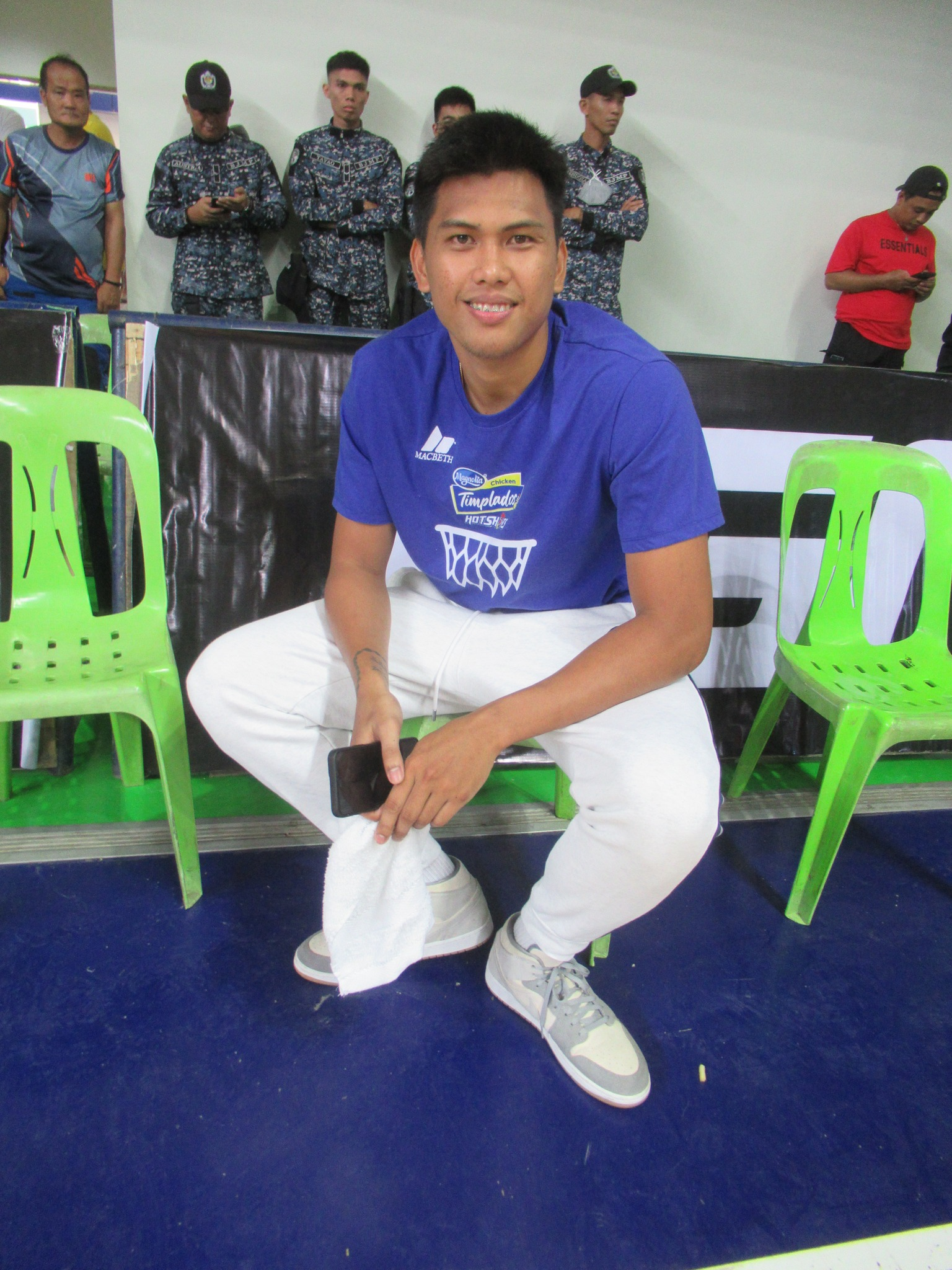
Aris Dionisio was the inaugural recipient of the DPOY award in the 2018–19 season.

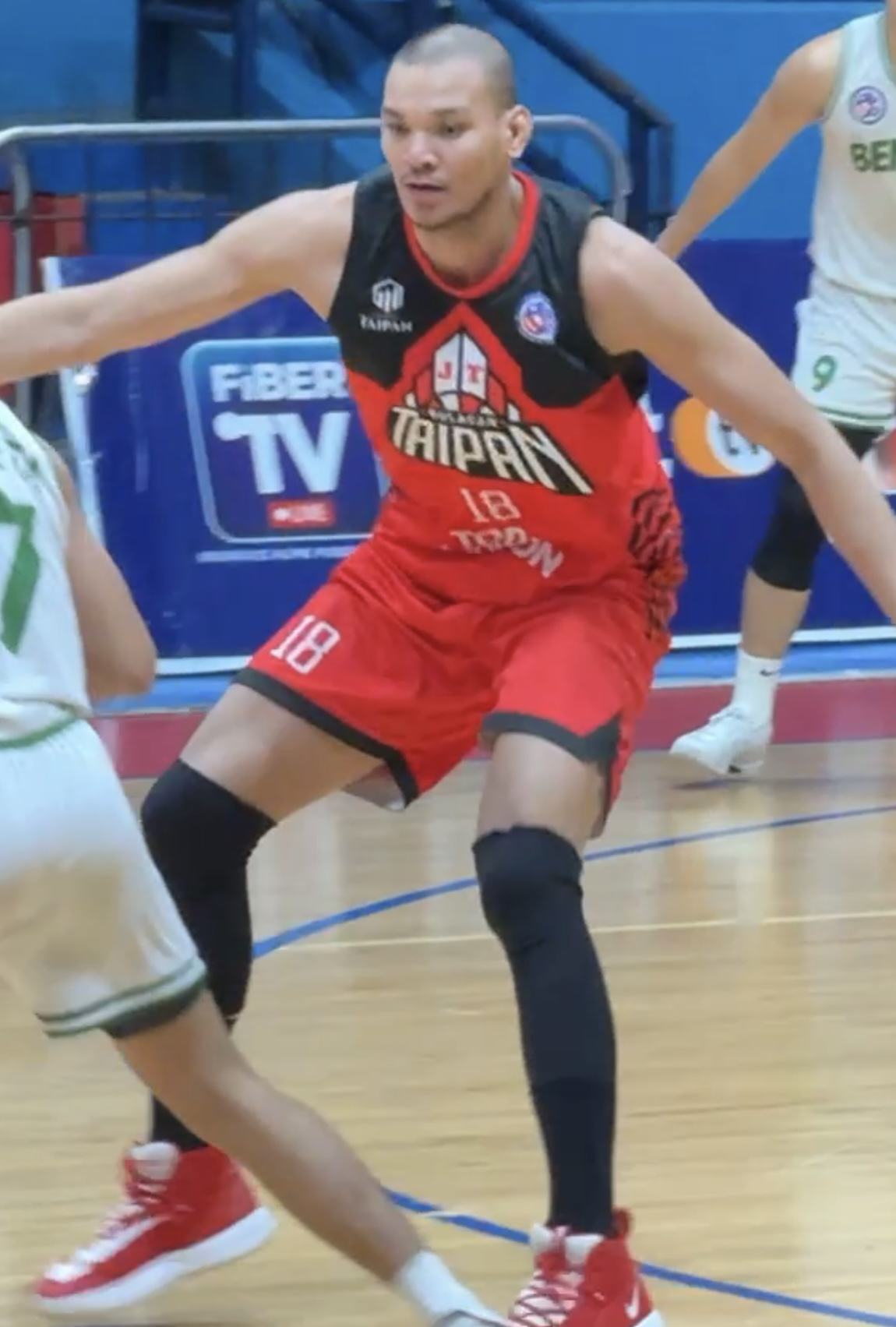
Jason Ballesteros was the 2023 recipient of the award.

^	Denotes player who is still active in the MPBL
†	Denotes player who is still active outside of the MPBL
Player (#)	Denotes the number of times the player had been named DPOY at that time

Season	Player	Pos.	Team	Ref.
2018–19	Aris Dionisio^{†}	F	Manila Stars	
2019–20	Mark Yee^	C	Davao Occidental Tigers	
2022	Mark Yee^ (2)	C	Bacolod Bingo Plus	
2023	Jason Ballesteros^	C	Pasig City MCW Sports	
2024	Dawn Ochea^	F	Batangas City Tanduay Rum Masters	
2025	Antonio Bonsubre Jr.^	F	Caloocan Batang Kankaloo	
