= Billy Robles =

Filipino basketball player

No. 10 – Rizal Golden Coolers
- Position: Point guard
- League: MPBL

Personal information
- Born: May 30, 1992 (age 34)
- Listed height: 6 ft 0 in (1.83 m)

Career information
- College: NIPSC
- PBA draft: 2016: undrafted
- Playing career: 2016–present

Career history
- 2016–2017: Rain or Shine Elasto Painters
- 2018–2021: Davao Occidental Tigers
- 2022–2023: Phoenix Super LPG Fuel Masters
- 2023: Makati OKBet Kings
- 2023–2025: Nueva Ecija Capitals / Rice Vanguards
- 2026–present: Rizal Golden Coolers

Career highlights
- MPBL champion (2021); MPBL All-Star (2026); MPBL Sportsmanship award (2020)

Billy Ray Robles (born May 30, 1992) is a Filipino professional basketball player for the Rizal Golden Coolers of the Maharlika Pilipinas Basketball League (MPBL).

Robles played his college career at Northern Iloilo Polytechnic State College before trying out in the PBA D-League and Pilipinas Commercial Basketball League (PCBL). He went undrafted in the 2016 PBA draft but later signed a deal with the Rain or Shine Elasto Painters, although he didn't get any significant playing time. In 2018, he joined the expansion Davao Occidental Tigers of the then-amateur Maharlika Pilipinas Basketball League (MPBL) and won a championship with the team in 2021.

After a short stint with Davao Occidental in FilBasket, Robles returned to the PBA in 2022, this time with the Phoenix Super LPG Fuel Masters. In 2023, Billy moved back to the now-professional MPBL with the Makati OKBet Kings, but later that year, he moved to the Nueva Ecija Rice Vanguards franchise.

== Career statistics ==
=== PBA ===
Legend
| GP | Games played | MPG | Minutes per game |
| FG% | Field-goal percentage | 3P% | 3-point field-goal percentage | FT% | Free-throw percentage |
| RPG | Rebounds per game | APG | Assists per game | SPG | Steals per game |
| BPG | Blocks per game | PPG | Points per game | **Bold** | Career high |

As of the end of 2022–23 season

=== Season-by-season averages ===
| Year | Team | GP | MPG | FG% | 3P% | FT% | RPG | APG | SPG | BPG | PPG |
|---|---|---|---|---|---|---|---|---|---|---|---|
| 2016–17 | Rain or Shine | 6 | 5.2 | **.412** | **.333** | — | 1.2 | **1.0** | — | — | 2.5 |
| 2021 | Phoenix Super LPG | 7 | **12.6** | .333 | .167 | **.750** | **2.7** | .6 | **.7** | **.4** | **3.9** |
| 2022–23 | Phoenix Super LPG | **10** | 5.8 | .389 | .000 | .600 | 1.5 | .3 | .3 | — | 1.7 |
| Career | | 23 | 7.7 | .368 | .143 | .667 | 1.8 | .6 | .3 | .1 | 2.6 |

=== MPBL ===
Legend
| GP | Games played | GS | Games started | MPG | Minutes per game |
| FG% | Field-goal percentage | 3P% | 3-point field-goal percentage | FT% | Free-throw percentage |
| RPG | Rebounds per game | APG | Assists per game | SPG | Steals per game |
| BPG | Blocks per game | PPG | Points per game | **Bold** | Career high |

| Year | Team | GP | GS | MPG | FG% | 3P% | FT% | RPG | APG | SPG | BPG | PPG |
|---|---|---|---|---|---|---|---|---|---|---|---|---|
| 2018–19 | Davao Occidental | 35 | 35 | **27.2** | .399 | .086 | **.697** | 6.5 | **3.1** | 0.9 | **1.0** | 10.6 |
| 2019–20 | Davao Occidental | **40** | **40** | 25.6 | .409 | .247 | .661 | 6.9 | 2.8 | 0.9 | 0.9 | 10.0 |
| 2023 | Makati | 27 | 27 | 25.8 | **.486** | **.270** | .610 | **8.6** | 3.0 | **1.2** | 0.9 | **11.6** |
