= MPBL sportsmanship award =

Annual Maharlika Pilipinas Basketball League award

The MPBL sportsmanship award is an annual Maharlika Pilipinas Basketball League award given to the player who has shown sportsmanlike behavior throughout the season. It was first awarded during the 2018–19 MPBL season.

As of 2025, three players have won the award with Jay-R Taganas receiving the award three times. Nikko Panganiban with two and Billy Ray Robles was the only other recipient, having won the award in 2020.

== Winners ==
^	Denotes player who is still active in the MPBL
†	Denotes player who is still active outside of the MPBL
Player (#)	Denotes the number of times the player had been named MVP at that time
Team (#)	Denotes the number of times a player from this team had won at that time

Season	Player	Pos.	Team	Ref.
2018–19	Jay-R Taganas^	F	Bulacan Kuyas	
2019–20	Billy Ray Robles^	F	Davao Occidental Tigers	
2022	Jay-R Taganas^ (2)	F	Nueva Ecija Rice Vanguards (1)	
2023	Jay-R Taganas^ (3)	F	Nueva Ecija Rice Vanguards (2)	
2024	Nikko Panganiban^	G	San Juan Knights	
2025	Nikko Panganiban^ (2)	G	San Juan Knights (2)	
