= 2018–19 Muntinlupa Cagers season =

Results
- Record: 15–10 (.600)
- Place: Division: 3rd (South)
- Playoff finish: Division Quarterfinals (lost vs. Zamboanga, 1–2)

Muntinlupa Cagers seasons

The 2018–19 Muntinlupa Cagers season was the second season of the franchise in the Maharlika Pilipinas Basketball League (MPBL).

Muntinlupa started the season strong by winning eight straight games, but would only win six out of the sixteen remaining games. Still, by finishing 15–10, the Cagers managed to clinch the third seed in the South Division, the same seed they claimed in their previous campaign. In the playoffs, they met the Zamboanga Family's Brand Sardines in the Division Quarterfinals. The Cagers would win game 1, but would lose the next two games, cutting their playoff run short in an upset.

All of the team's home games were played at Muntinlupa Sports Complex.

== Regular season ==
=== Standings ===
Pos	Team	Pld	W	L	PCT	GB	Qualification
1	Davao Occidental Tigers	25	20	5	.800	—	Playoffs
2	Batangas City Athletics	25	15	10	.600 (Note: Batangas City wins tiebreaker over Muntinlupa by head-to-head victory.)	5	Playoffs
3	Muntinlupa Cagers	25	15	10	.600	5	Playoffs
4	GenSan Warriors	25	14	11	.560	6	Playoffs
5	Bacoor City Strikers	25	13	12	.520	7	Playoffs

Source: Standings
Rules for classification: 1) Wins; 2a) If two teams are tied, head-to-head match-up; 2b) If three or more teams are tied, head-to-head point quotient; 3) overall point quotient; 4) coin toss.

=== Schedule ===
2018–19 Muntinlupa Cagers season schedule
Game	Date	Opponent	Score	Location	Record	Recap
1	June 12	Mandaluyong	W 86–74	Smart Araneta Coliseum	1–0	
2	June 21	Marikina	W 85–76	Muntinlupa Sports Complex	2–0	
3	July 4	Zamboanga	W 85–69	Marist School	3–0	
4	August 9	Rizal	W 84–80	Imus City Sports Complex	4–0	
5	August 22	San Juan	W 77–71	Muntinlupa Sports Complex	5–0	
6	September 4	Bacoor City	W 97–83	Imus City Sports Complex	6–0	
7	September 13	Parañaque	W 77–76	Imus City Sports Complex	7–0	
8	September 27	Basilan	W 99–75	Bulacan Capitol Gymnasium	8–0	
9	October 10	Manila	L 86–100	Muntinlupa Sports Complex	8–1	
10	October 18	Batangas City	L 71–82	Lagao Gymnasium	8–2	
11	November 5	General Santos	W 61–60	Caloocan Sports Complex	9–2	
12	November 19	Makati	L 50–52	Marist School	9–3	
13	November 28	Quezon City	L 97–100 (OT)	Muntinlupa Sports Complex	9–4	
14	December 1	Laguna	L 94–95	Alonte Sports Arena	9–5	
15	December 6	Imus	W 80–74	Imus City Sports Complex	10–5	
16	January 3	Pasay	W 80–67	Alonte Sports Arena	11–5	
17	January 9	Valenzuela	W 90–86	Valenzuela Astrodome	12–5	
18	January 19	Cebu City	L 73–80	Marist School	12–6	
19	January 26	Pampanga	L 80–87	Angeles University Foundation	12–7	
20	February 4	Bataan	L 63–67	Bataan People's Center	12–8	
21	February 7	Pasig	W 98–92 (OT)	Muntinlupa Sports Complex	13–8	
22	February 16	Caloocan	L 72–79	Strike Gymnasium	13–9	
23	February 21	Bulacan	W 86–66	Muntinlupa Sports Complex	14–9	
24	March 6	Davao Occidental	L 82–88	Muntinlupa Sports Complex	14–10	
25	March 9 (Note: Originally played on July 29, the game was suspended at 98–95 due to a broken rim. Play continued on March 9 and concluded with a score of 101–95.)	Navotas	W 101–95	Navotas Sports Complex	15–10	
Source: Schedule

== Playoffs ==
=== Schedule ===
2019 Muntinlupa Cagers playoffs schedule
Round	Game	Date	Opponent	Score	Location	Series	Recap
Division Quarterfinals	1	March 19	Zamboanga	W 89–78	Batangas City Coliseum	1–0	
Division Quarterfinals	2	March 21	Zamboanga	L 73–84	Muntinlupa Sports Complex	1–1	
Division Quarterfinals	3	March 25	Zamboanga	L 83–87	Batangas City Coliseum	1–2	
Source: Schedule
