= Aris Dionisio =

Filipino basketball player

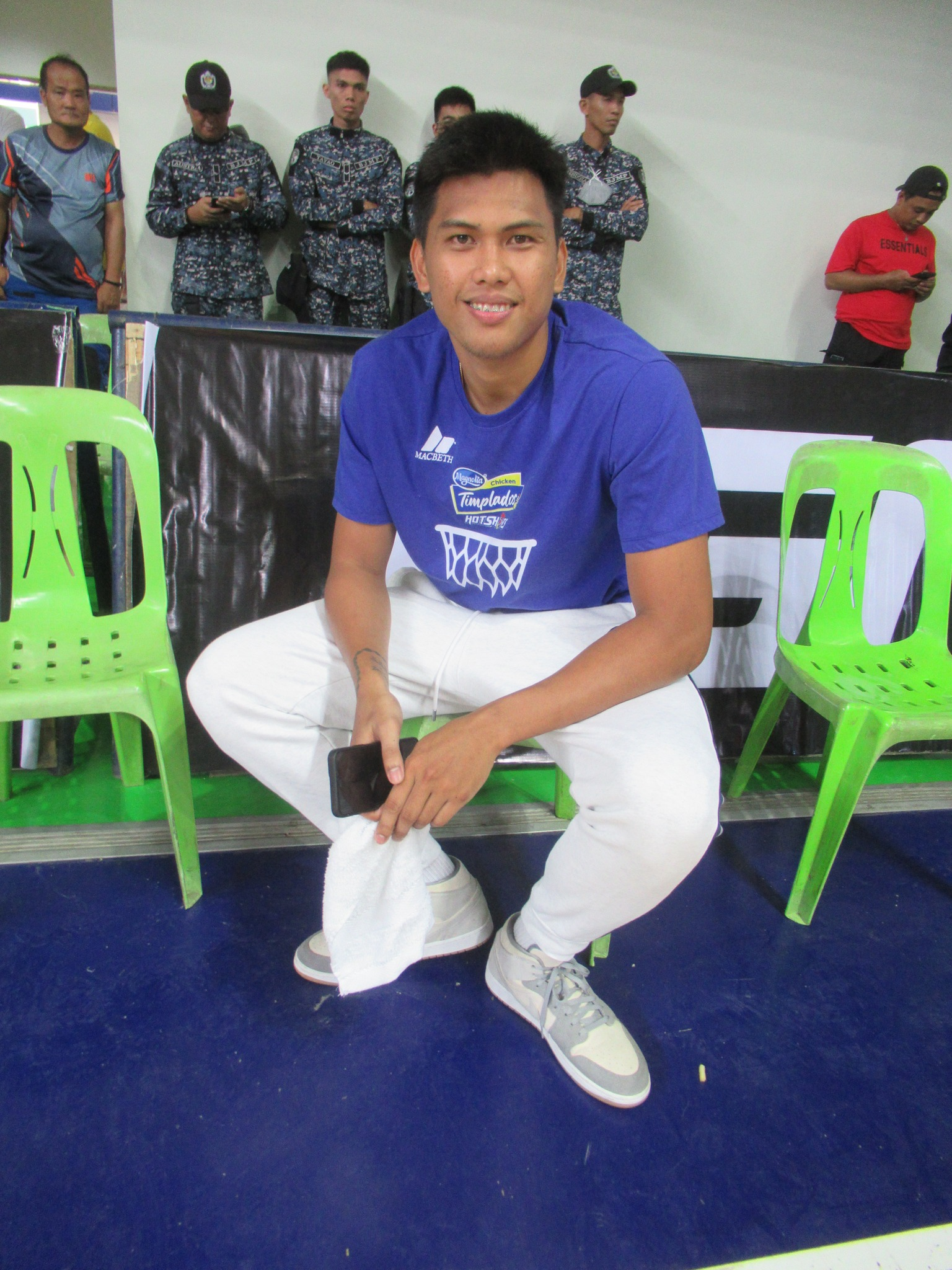
- Dionisio in 2023

No. 21 – Titan Ultra Giant Risers
- Position: Small forward / power forward
- League: PBA

Personal information
- Born: July 21, 1995 (age 31) Bustos, Bulacan, Philippines
- Listed height: 6 ft 4 in (1.93 m)

Career information
- College: Saint Clare College of Caloocan
- PBA draft: 2019: 1st round, 9th overall pick
- Drafted by: Magnolia Hotshots Pambansang Manok
- Playing career: 2018–present

Career history
- 2018–2020: Manila Stars
- 2020–2025: Magnolia Hotshots Pambansang Manok/Magnolia Pambansang Manok Hotshots/Magnolia Chicken Timplados Hotshots
- 2025–present: Titan Ultra Giant Risers

Career highlights
- PBA All-Star (2024); All-MPBL First Team (2019); All-MPBL Second Team (2020); MPBL Defensive Player of the Year (2019); 2× MPBL All-Star (2019, 2020)

Aristotle Dionisio (born July 21, 1995) is a Filipino professional basketball player for the Titan Ultra Giant Risers of the Philippine Basketball Association (PBA). He was selected 9th overall in the 2019 PBA draft by Magnolia Hotshots.

== Amateur career ==
=== Manila Stars (2018–2020) ===
Dionisio first played with the Manila Stars of the Maharlika Pilipinas Basketball League (MPBL). During his two-year stint with the Stars, he made two all-star appearances, won a Defensive Player of the Year award, and earned two All-MPBL selections.

== Professional career ==
=== Magnolia Hotshots (2020–2025) ===
On December 8, 2019, Dionisio was selected ninth overall by the Magnolia Hotshots in the 2019 PBA draft.

In 2024, Dionisio would make his first PBA all-star appearance as a replacement for Scottie Thompson, who was injured at the time.

On March 12, 2024, he signed a three-year contract extension with the Hotshots.

=== Titan Ultra Giant Risers (2025–present) ===
On October 28, 2025, Dionisio was traded to the Titan Ultra Giant Risers in exchange for Chris Koon.

== PBA career statistics ==
Legend
GP	Games played	MPG	Minutes per game	FG%	Field-goal percentage
3FG%	3-point field-goal percentage	4P%	4-point field-goal percentage	FT%	Free-throw percentage
RPG	Rebounds per game	APG	Assists per game	SPG	Steals per game
BPG	Blocks per game	PPG	Points per game	127	Career high

As of the end of 2025–26 season

=== Season-by-season averages ===
Year	Team	GP	MPG	FG%	3P%	4P%	FT%	RPG	APG	SPG	BPG	PPG
2020	Magnolia	9	12.9	.442	.500	—	.571	2.6	.3	.3	.8	5.8
2021	Magnolia	36	12.0	.382	.325	—	.680	2.3	.3	.5	.4	4.1
2022–23	Magnolia	47	16.6	.466	.409	—	.723	3.7	.4	.6	.5	6.3
2023–24	Magnolia	31	17.0	.411	.427	—	.852	3.6	.5	.7	.5	6.0
2024–25	Magnolia	42	17.5	.350	.346	.077	.813	3.5	.6	.9	.5	5.4
2025–26	Magnolia	33	21.1	.379	.360	.100	.769	4.6	.8	.9	.7	7.0
2025–26	Titan Ultra	33	21.1	.379	.360	.100	.769	4.6	.8	.9	.7	7.0
Career		198	16.6	.402	.378	.087	.762	3.5	.5	.7	.5	5.7
