= Marikina Shoemasters =

Professional basketball team in Marikina, Philippines

- 2026 Marikina Shoemasters season
- League: MPBL; PSL
- Founded: 2018; 8 years ago
- History: Marikina Shoemasters; 2018, 2020, 2022–2024, 2025–present Marikina Shoelanders; 2019; Marikina Shoe City; 2021; Verdiamonds Jewelry Incorp; 2024–2025; Marikina Verdiamonds Jewellers; 2025
- Arena: Marikina Sports Center
- Location: Marikina
- Team colors
- Main sponsor: BigZ Burger
- Head coach: Angelo Nebres

The Marikina Shoemasters, also known as Marikina BigZ Burger for sponsorship reasons, are a Filipino professional basketball team based in Marikina. The team competes in the Maharlika Pilipinas Basketball League (MPBL) as a member of the league's North Division. The team most recently played its home games at the indoor arena of the Marikina Sports Center.

The Marikina franchise began play as an expansion team for the 2018–19 season. The mame references Marikina's moniker as the "Shoe Capital of the Philippines".

In 2023, the franchise launched its junior side, the Marikina Junior Shoemasters, for the inaugural season of the Junior MPBL. Later that year, their women's volleyball counterpart, the Marikina Lady Shoemasters, began play in the Maharlika Pilipinas Volleyball Association (MPVA).

The Marikina franchise is one of four teams based in the Eastern Manila District of Metro Manila. The team has also participated in the Chooks-to-Go Pilipinas 3x3.

== History ==
=== 2018–2020 ===
The Marikina Shoemasters were established in 2018, as part of the MPBL's expansion lineup for the 2018–19 season. As part of the South Division, the Shoemasters, led by Yves Sazon and Erwin Sta. Maria, only managed to win eight games out of 25, putting the team at 11th place in the South.

Heading into the 2019–20 season, Marikina was realigned to the North Division, and despite keeping the same core players, the team still only won eight games in the 30-game season, putting the team at 13th in the North and missing the playoffs once again.

=== 2022–present ===
The Shoemasters entered the 2022 season with a rebuilt roster led by Lorenzo Joson. Although the team only finished with an 8–13 record, it was enough to give Marikina its first playoff appearance. The team would then be swept by the undefeated Nueva Ecija Rice Vanguards in the First Round. Although Joson would leave the team for General Santos in 2023, Marikina would add Felipe Chavez and collegiate player Marwin Dionisio alongside Joe Gomez de Liaño to its roster. Marikina went on to have a tough playoff race against the Bataan Risers, which Marikina won in the final week as they claimed the eighth seed once again. On top of that, Marikina finished 16–12, their first winning record in franchise history. In the playoffs, the Shoemasters would be swept by the top seed Pampanga Giant Lanterns in the First Round.

Marikina would also broaden its venture into sports development around this time. The Marikina Junior Shoemasters joined as part of the founding lineup of the youth-oriented Junior MPBL. Its women's volleyball counterpart, the Marikina Lady Shoemasters, was also established and will play in the inaugural season of the Maharlika Pilipinas Volleyball Association (MPVA).

After the 2023 season, Elvis Tolentino departed Marikina after four seasons with the team, bringing his coaching duties to South Cotabato. Rysal Castro succeeded his role beginning in 2024. The team, however, would fall to 13th after finishing with a 7–21 record.

In 2025, the franchise was acquired by Verdiamonds Jewelry Inc., which had owned a Malabon-based team in the Pilipinas Super League during its 2024–25 season. The team was then known as the Marikina Verdiamonds Jewellers before reverting later in the season.

== Home venues ==
The Marikina franchise first played their home games in the city's Marist School in the 2018–19 season. Starting with the 2019–20 season, the team began playing at the Marikina Sports Center, which would become their primary venue from 2022 onwards.

| Venue | Location | 2018–19 | 2019–20 | 2022 | 2023 | 2024 | 2025 |
|---|---|---|---|---|---|---|---|
| Marist School (Marist School Gymnasium) | Marikina | ✓ | ✓ | ✗ | ✗ | ✗ | ✗ |
| Marikina Sports Center | Marikina | ✗ | ✓ | ✓ | ✓ | ✗ | ✓ |

== Personnel ==
=== Current roster ===
Marikina Shoemasters roster
Players

| Pos. | No. | Name | Height | Weight | DOB | From |
|---|---|---|---|---|---|---|
| F | 00 | Jason Strait | 6 ft 4 in (1.93 m) | | 1996–07–22 | UE |
| C | 4 | RV Berjay | 6 ft 5 in (1.96 m) | | | Ateneo |
| G | 5 | Regie Boy Basibas | 6 ft 4 in (1.93 m) | | 1994–01–09 | UST |
| F | 6 | Ridge Luciano (HG) | 5 ft 10 in (1.78 m) | | | OLFU |
| G | 7 | John Jordan Sta. Ana | 6 ft 1 in (1.85 m) | | | Arellano |
| F | 8 | Alvin Pasaol | 6 ft 2 in (1.88 m) | 200 lb (91 kg) | 1995–05–06 | UE |
| G | 12 | Silas Zabale (HG) | 5 ft 10 in (1.78 m) | | 2000-10-30 | Centro Escolar |
| G | 14 | Jethro Escoto (HG) | 5 ft 9 in (1.75 m) | | | Philippine Christian |
| C | 15 | Jeepy Faundo | 6 ft 6 in (1.98 m) | | 1995—09—21 | UST |
| F/C | 19 | Eroll Soriano (HG) | 6 ft 3 in (1.91 m) | | | ICC |
| G | 20 | Jomel Landayan (HG) | 5 ft 7 in (1.70 m) | | 1998-09-01 | PLMar |
| F | 21 | Jacob Ubaldo (HG) | 6 ft 3 in (1.91 m) | | | OLFU |
| G | 22 | Ranzel Casajeros (HG) | 5 ft 11 in (1.80 m) | | 2000-08-22 | Philippine Christian |
| G | 23 | Deo Timajo (HG) | 5 ft 11 in (1.80 m) | | | De Ocampo |
| G | 27 | Gjerard Wilson (FF) | 6 ft 1 in (1.85 m) | | | UE |
| F | 33 | Rhon Bonifacio | 6 ft 2 in (1.88 m) | | 2003-08-21 | PLMar |
| C | 55 | Tsutomu Tateishi (FF) | 6 ft 10 in (2.08 m) | | 1997-12-29 | St. Benilde |
| G | 77 | Felix Villarente (HG) | 5 ft 9 in (1.75 m) | | 2001-04-01 | Emilio Aguinaldo |
| F | 78 | John Ray Alabanza | 6 ft 5 in (1.96 m) | | 1987-10-14 | UE |
| G | — | David Licauco | 5 ft 11 in (1.80 m) | | 1994-06-15 | St. Benilde |

Coaches

Head coach

- Angelo Nebres

Assistant coach(es)

- Carlo Tomacas
- Mong Basco
- Robin Zapanta
- Mel Gador

Team consultant

- Bam Ledesma

Team manager

- Michael Gonzalez

Legend

- (HG) Homegrown
- (FF) Filipino-foreigner
- (EA) EASL player
- (RS) Reserve player
- (S) Suspended
- Injured

- Roster – via Genius Sports
Updated as of: June 22, 2026

=== Head coaches ===
Marikina Shoemasters head coaches
| # | Name | Start | End | Achievements | Ref. |
|---|---|---|---|---|---|
| 1 | Elvis Tolentino | 2018 | 2023 | — | |
| 2 | Rysal Castro | 2024 | 2024 | — | |
| 3 | Eric Sy | 2025 | 2025 | — | |
| 4 | Angelo Nebres | 2025 | current | — | |

== Notable players ==
=== MPBL All-Star Day ===
All-Star selections

- Gerald Anderson – 2019
- Ato Ular – 2019, 2020
- Lorenzo Joson – 2022
- Felipe Chavez – 2023

=== PBA players ===
Ex-PBA players

- Ed Daquioag
- Jondan Salvador
- Louie Vigil
- Warren Ybañez

Drafted to PBA

- Ato Ular – 13th overall, season 47
- Miguel Corteza – 20th overall, season 49

=== Other notable players ===
- Gerald Anderson

== Season-by-season records ==
Note: Statistics are correct as of the end of the 2026 MPBL season.

| MPBL champions | Division champions | Playoff berth |

| Season | League | Division | Regular season | | | | | | Playoffs | |
| Season | League | Division | Finish | Played | Wins | Losses | Win % | GB | Round | Results |
|---|---|---|---|---|---|---|---|---|---|---|
Marikina Shoemasters
| 2018–19 | MPBL | South | 11th | 25 | 8 | 17 | .320 | 12 | Did not qualify | |
| 2019–20 | MPBL | North | 13th | 30 | 8 | 22 | .267 | 18 | Did not qualify | |
| 2022 | MPBL | North | 8th | 21 | 8 | 13 | .381 | 13 | Division quarterfinals | lost vs. Nueva Ecija, 0–2 |
| 2023 | MPBL | North | 8th | 28 | 16 | 12 | .571 | 10 | Division quarterfinals | lost vs. Pampanga, 0–2 |
| 2024 | MPBL | North | 13th | 28 | 7 | 21 | .250 | 19 | Did not qualify | |
| 2025 | MPBL | North | 14th | 29 | 4 | 25 | .138 | 24 | Did not qualify | |
| 2026 | MPBL | North | 12th | 25 | 6 | 19 | .240 | 17 | Did not qualify | |
| Regular season record | | | | 186 | 57 | 129 | .306 | | 2 playoff appearances | |
| Playoff record | | | | 4 | 0 | 4 | .000 | | 0 finals appearances | |
| Cumulative record | | | | 190 | 57 | 133 | .300 | | 0 championships | |
