= Manila Batang Quiapo =

Professional basketball team in Manila, Philippines

- 2026 Manila Batang Quiapo season
- League: MPBL (2018–present); PSL (2022–2024)
- Founded: 2018; 8 years ago
- History: Manila Stars; 2018–2024 (MPBL); Manila CityStars; 2022–2024 (PSL); Manila SV Batang Sampaloc; 2024; Manila Batang Quiapo; 2025–present
- Arena: San Andres Sports Complex; Paco Arena; Rizal Memorial Coliseum
- Location: Quiapo, Manila
- Team colors
- Head coach: Max Dayandante

The Manila Batang Quiapo are a Filipino professional basketball team based in Manila and representing the district of Quiapo. The team competes in the Maharlika Pilipinas Basketball League (MPBL) as a member of the league's North Division. The team splits its home games between San Andres Sports Complex in Malate and Paco Arena in Paco.

The Manila franchise was founded as an expansion team for the 2018–19 MPBL season as the Manila Stars and saw early success in its first two seasons with Chris Bitoon and Aris Dionisio leading the team, making the division finals in 2019. The team is also noted for its acquisition of Greg Slaughter in 2024, during which the team gained the backing of businessman Sam Verzosa and the Strong Group Athletics organization and were renamed the Manila SV Batang Sampaloc. The team also competed in the Pilipinas Super League from 2022 to 2024 as the Manila CityStars.

The Batang Quiapo are currently the only team based in the Capital District of Metro Manila.

== History ==
=== Maharlika Pilipinas Basketball League ===
==== 2019–2020: The Bitoon–Dionisio era ====
The nation's capital joined the MPBL for the 2018–19 season, and in its first season, made an instant impact. Led by the duo of Chris Bitoon and Aris Dionisio, the team finished 20–5, tying with San Juan and Davao Occidental for the league's third-best record, as the Stars clinch the fourth seed in the 2019 playoffs. After getting past Caloocan in the First Round, they met with the league-leading Bataan Risers in the North Division Semifinals. Although Bataan won game 1, Manila pushed through the next two games to finish the upset and advance to the North Division Finals against San Juan. The series went in a similar way but in the opposite manner, as Manila won game 1 but with San Juan winning the next two to advance to the National Finals and eventually win the championship. At the end of the season, Dionisio won MPBL Defensive Player of the Year. He and Bitoon were also selected to the All-MPBL First Team and declared all-stars.

Manila came back stronger for the 2019–20 season, finishing 25–5, clinching the second seed in the 2020 playoffs. The team first beat Pasig in the First Round, but feel short in the Division Semifinals against Makati. Once again, Manila won game 1, yet Makati won the rest of the series. Dionisio became a two-time all-star while he and Bitoon both made the All-MPBL Second Team.

==== 2021–2023: Out of contention ====
For the 2021 Invitational, Manila tapped Pocholo Villanueva as their head coach, but only finished third in Group D, failing to make the playoffs. Villanueva would later depart for the Batangas City Embassy Chill. Following the departures of both Bitoon and Dionisio, Manila spent the next two seasons missing the playoffs, finishing 6–15 and 4–23 in the 2022 and 2023 seasons, respectively.

==== 2024–present: Return to form ====
Logo used in 2024 under the backing of Sam Verzosa and Strong Group Athletics.

In the 2024 season, the team gained the backing of the Strong Group Athletics organization, and would later be renamed as the Manila Batang Sampaloc, or officially, the Manila SV Batang Sampaloc SGA. Their 2024 campaign is noted for their acquisition of four-time PBA champion Greg Slaughter among other ex-PBA players. With their new acquisitions, the team finished the season 20–8 for their best output since 2020 and once again claiming a top-4 position. Slaughter and Rabeh Al-Hussaini were declared all-stars in the 2024 MPBL All-Star Game.

However, despite that, Manila fell short in the playoffs, losing to the Caloocan Batang Kankaloo in a division quarterfinals sweep, with both games being separated by one point. After the series, the organization stated that they are unsure if they will return for the 2025 MPBL season, citing financial difficulties and "uneven officiating".

=== Pilipinas Super League ===
The Stars came to the PSL for the 2022 DUMPER Cup during the MPBL's off-season. Finishing 9–6 in the conference, Manila tied with Boracay and Bulacan for seventh. The team managed to settle for eighth but lost to the San Juan Kings in the quarterfinals.

== Team identity ==
The original Stars name can be traced back to the Manila Metrostars of the now-defunct Metropolitan Basketball Association. The team's logos until 2023 featured silhouettes of some of Manila's historic landmarks, such as the Rizal Monument and Manila Cathedral. Manila's color scheme has always used blue as the primary color.

== Home venues ==
The Manila franchise has played most of their home games at San Andres Sports Complex since joining the MPBL. In 2022 and 2024, a portion of their home slate was played at Paco Arena. In 2025, the team began playing games at the historic Rizal Memorial Coliseum.

Venue	Location	Capacity	2018–19	2019–20	2022	2023	2024	2025	2026
San Andres Sports Complex	Manila	3,000	✓	✓	✓	✓	✓	✓	✗
Paco Arena	Manila	1,000	✗	✗	✓	✗	✓	✓	✓
Rizal Memorial Coliseum	Manila	6,100	✗	✗	✗	✗	✗	✓	✗

== Current roster ==
Manila Batang Quiapo roster
Players

Pos.	No.	Name	Height	Weight	DOB	From
G	1	Kenneth Pagkalinawan (HG)	6 ft 3 in (1.91 m)			José Rizal
F	2	Jason Vincent Mancao	5 ft 9 in (1.75 m)			San Sebastian
G	3	Joe Gomez de Liaño	6 ft 2 in (1.88 m)		2000–08–24	Philippines
G	4	Jose Marcell Canlas	5 ft 11 in (1.80 m)			PCCr
G	5	Karlo Christopher Lazaro	6 ft 3 in (1.91 m)			PCCr
G	6	Mon Rogado	6 ft 0 in (1.83 m)			Cebu
F	9	Chester Saldua	6 ft 5 in (1.96 m)		1994–05–19	Philippine Christian
G	10	Ivann Salinel	6 ft 0 in (1.83 m)		2002–12–01	WCC-ATC
G	11	Arius Soriano	6 ft 1 in (1.85 m)			PCCr
G	13	John Ashley Faa	5 ft 11 in (1.80 m)			PCCr
C	14	John Derico Lopez	6 ft 4 in (1.93 m)			José Rizal
F	17	Alfred Sedillo	6 ft 3 in (1.91 m)			San Beda
G	18	Jed Salaveria (HG)	6 ft 3 in (1.91 m)			José Rizal
F	19	Lawrence Joshua Siapco	5 ft 8 in (1.73 m)			PCCr
F	23	Terrence Tumalip	6 ft 1 in (1.85 m)	190 lb (86 kg)	1990–05–13	TIP
F	24	Mark Anthony Doligon	6 ft 3 in (1.91 m)			Arellano
F	25	Redgimir Eusebio	5 ft 11 in (1.80 m)			PCCr
F	27	John Matthew Sibug	5 ft 9 in (1.75 m)			RTU
G	29	Ralph Nelson De Guzman	5 ft 9 in (1.75 m)			WCC-ATC
F	73	Jan Baltazar	6 ft 2 in (1.88 m)			SCT
G	77	Alexandrine Testado	5 ft 8 in (1.73 m)			PCCr
F	81	Bryle Caraballos	6 ft 2 in (1.88 m)			PATTS
F	89	Rancer Serrano	6 ft 2 in (1.88 m)			RTU

Coaches

Head coach

- Max Dayandante

Assistant coach(es)

- Clint Guzarin
- Arjay Dionero
- Fernando Bunag
- Jerson Torres
- Rajay Chandumal

Team manager

- Raymond Ang
- Emilio Tiu

Legend

- (HG) Homegrown
- (FF) Filipino-foreigner
- (EA) EASL player
- (RS) Reserve player
- (S) Suspended
- Injured

- Roster – via Genius Sports
Updated as of: June 22, 2026

=== Head coaches ===
Manila Batang Quiapo head coaches
#	Name	Start	End	Achievements	Ref.
1	Philip Cezar	2018	2019	—	
2	Tino Pinat	2019	2020	—	
3	Pocholo Villanueva	2021	2021	—	
4	Max Dayandante	2022	2022	—	
5	Tylon Darjuan	2023	2023	—	
6	Bam Ledesma	2023	2023	—	
7	Bimbot Anquilo	2023	2023	—	
8	Gabby Severino	2024	2024	—	
9	Ariel Vanguardia	2024	2024	—	
10	Max Dayandante	2025	current	—	

== Notable players ==
=== Individual award winners ===
MPBL Defensive Player of the Year

- Aris Dionisio – 2019

All-MPBL First Team

- Chris Bitoon – 2019
- Aris Dionisio – 2019

All-MPBL Second Team

- Chris Bitoon – 2020
- Aris Dionisio – 2020
- Greg Slaughter – 2024

=== MPBL All-Star Day ===
All-Star selections

- Chris Bitoon – 2019
- Aris Dionisio – 2019, 2020
- Ronnie Matias – 2022
- Rabeh Al-Hussaini – 2024
- Greg Slaughter – 2024

=== PBA players ===
Ex-PBA players

- Marcy Arellano
- JR Cawaling
- Reil Cervantes
- Gabby Espinas
- Jeric Fortuna
- Marvin Hayes
- Carlo Lastimosa
- Ronnie Matias
- Greg Slaughter
- Mac Tallo
- Roger Yap

Drafted to PBA

- Aris Dionisio – 9th overall, 2019
- Rey Mark Acuno – 14th overall, season 46
- Mark Dyke – 11th overall, season 47
- Jollo Go – 27th overall, season 47
- Francis Escandor – 13th overall, season 49
- Didat Hanapi – 17th overall, season 49
- DJ Mitchell – 26th overall, season 49

== Season-by-season records ==
League champions
Division champions
Qualified for playoffs
Best regular season record

=== Maharlika Pilipinas Basketball League ===
Season	Regular season							Playoffs	
Season	Division	Finish	GP	W	L	PCT	GB	Stage	Results
Manila Stars
2018–19; Datu Cup	North	4th	25	20	5	.800	3	Division quarterfinals Division semifinals Division finals	won vs. Bulacan, 2–0 won vs. Bataan, 2–1 lost vs. San Juan, 1–2
2019–20; Lakan Season	North	2nd	30	25	5	.833	1	Division quarterfinals Division semifinals	won vs. Pasig, 2–0 lost vs. Makati, 1–2
2022	North	10th	21	6	15	.286	15	Did not qualify	
2023	North	13th	27	4	23	.148	21.5	Did not qualify	
Manila SV Batang Sampaloc
2024	North	4th	28	20	8	.714	6	Division quarterfinals	lost vs. Caloocan, 0–2
Manila Batang Quiapo
2025	North	14th	29	4	25	.138	24	Did not qualify	
2026	North	14th	25	1	24	.040	22	Did not qualify	
All-time regular season record			185	80	105	.432		3 playoff appearances	
All-time playoff record			15	8	7	.533		0 finals appearances	
All-time overall record			200	88	112	.440		0 championships	

=== Pilipinas Super League ===
Season	Elimination round				Playoffs	
Season	Finish	W	L	PCT	Stage	Results
Manila CityStars
2022–23; DUMPER Cup	8th	9	6	.600	Quarterfinals	lost vs. San Juan, 0–1
2023–24; President's Cup	14th	5	13	.278	First Round	lost vs. Nueva Ecija, 0–1
All-time elimination round record		14	19	.424	2 playoff appearances	
All-time playoff record		0	1	.000	0 Finals appearances	
All-time overall record		9	7	.400	0 championships	
