= 2018 PBA D-League Foundation Cup =

Philippine basketball tournament

- The 8th PBA Foundation Cup
- Duration: June 4, 2018 – August 23, 2018
- Number of teams: 6
- TV partner(s): AksyonTV (ESPN 5) and Youtube (Livestreams)

PBA D-League Foundation Cup chronology
- < 2017 2019 >

The 2018 PBA D-League Foundation Cup is the second conference of the 2018 PBA Developmental League season. The tournament opened on June 4, 2018, at the Ynares Sports Arena, Pasig.

== Teams ==
PBA Development League current teams
Team	Company	Colors	Joined D-League	PBA Affiliate	Titles	Head coach
Centro Escolar University Scorpions	Centro Escolar University	Pink, Gray and White	2017 Foundation	Rain or Shine Elasto Painters	0	Derrick Pumaren
Che'Lu Bar and Grill Revellers	Hydra Connection Entertainment Corporation	Blue and White	2018 Aspirants	None	0	Stevenson Tiu
Go for Gold Scratchers	Powerball Marketing & Logistics Corporation	Orange and White	2018 Aspirants	Blackwater Elite	0	Charles Tiu
AMA Online Education Titans	AMA University	Crimson Red, Blue and White	2014 Aspirants	None	0	Mark Herrera
Batangas EAC Generals	Province of Batangas; Emilio Aguinaldo College	Red and White	2017 Aspirants	Globalport Batang Pier	0	Oliver Bunyi
Marinerong Pilipino Skippers - Technological Institute of the Philippines	Marinerong Pilipino Group; Technological Institute of the Philippines	Sky Blue and White	2017 Foundation	Alaska Aces	0	Koy Banal

== Tournament format ==
- Six teams will play in a single round-robin elimination phase.
- Only the top four teams will only make it to the playoffs after the elimination round.
- Top 2 teams will get a twice-to-beat semifinals incentives.
- The Semifinals and the Championship will both be contested in a best-of-3 series.

== Team standings ==
These are the team standings at the end of the elimination round:

Team	Win	Loss	PCT	Qualification
Chelu Bar & Grill Revellers	8	2	0.800	Twice-to-beat advantage in the semifinals
Go For Gold Scratchers	7	3	0.700	Twice-to-beat advantage in the semifinals
Marinerong Pilipino Skippers	6	4	0.600	Twice-to-win disadvantage in the semifinals
CEU Scorpions	5	5	0.500	Twice-to-win disadvantage in the semifinals
Batangas EAC Generals	4	6	0.400	Eliminated
AMA Online Education Titans	0	10	0.000	Eliminated

== Playoffs ==
Semifinals
CEU	1
Chelu	2
Marinerong Pilipino	0
Go for Gold	2

Finals
Chelu	2
Go for Gold	3

== Awards ==
2018 PBA D-League Foundation Cup Champions
Go For Gold Scratchers
First title
