= 2018–19 MPBL season =

2nd season of the Maharlika Pilipinas Basketball League

- League: Maharlika Pilipinas Basketball League
- Sport: Basketball
- Duration: Regular season: June 12, 2018 – March 11, 2019; Playoffs: March 12 – April 8, 2019; Finals: April 11–25, 2019
- Games: 364 (regular season)
- Teams: 26
- TV partner(s): S+A; Fox Sports

Regular season
- Top seed: Bataan Risers
- Season MVP: Gab Banal (Bacoor City)

Playoffs
- North Division champions: San Juan Knights
- North Division runners-up: Manila Stars
- South Division champions: Davao Occidental Tigers
- South Division runners-up: Batangas City Athletics

Finals
- Champions: San Juan Knights
- Runners-up: Davao Occidental Tigers
- Finals MVP: Mike Ayonayon (San Juan)

MPBL seasons
- ← 2018 2019–20 →

The 2018–19 MPBL season, also known as the MPBL Datu Cup, was the second season of the Maharlika Pilipinas Basketball League. The regular season began on June 12, 2018 with the opening ceremonies Smart Araneta Coliseum in Quezon City, and ended on March 11, 2019. The league also held its first ever All-Star Game at the SM Mall of Asia Arena in Pasay on March 2, 2019. The playoffs then began on March 12, 2019 and ended on April 25, 2019 when the San Juan Knights defeated the Davao Occidental Tigers in five games in the 2019 MPBL finals.

This season saw sixteen expansion teams, nearly tripling its size from 10 to 26 teams. It also marked the league's national expansion, with five of those teams coming from Visayas and Mindanao. This resulted in the league dividing into the North and South Divisions, although this only affected playoff seeding and not the overall format of the season, with the playoffs itself expanding to sixteen teams, eight per division.

== Teams ==
=== Expansion ===
After a successful inaugural season, sixteen teams joined the league, its biggest expansion to date, bringing the a total of 26 teams. Metro Manila is the region with the most expansion teams at seven, those being the Makati Skyscrapers, Mandaluyong El Tigre, Manila Stars, Marikina Shoemasters, Pasay Voyagers, Pasig Pirates, and San Juan Knights. The Pampanga Lanterns joined from Central Luzon while the Bacoor City Strikers, Laguna Heroes, and Rizal Golden Coolers, joined from Calabarzon.

As part of the league's national expansion, the five remaining expansion teams came from either Visayas or Mindanao. The Cebu City Sharks from Central Visayas are the only expansion team from Visayas. The four teams from Mindanao are the Zamboanga Valientes representing the Zamboanga Peninsula, the Davao Occidental Tigers from the Davao Region, the GenSan Warriors from Soccsksargen, and the Basilan Steel from the Autonomous Region in Muslim Mindanao (which later became Bangsamoro).

Mid-season, the MPBL side of the Zamboanga Valientes was relaunched and became the Zamboanga Family's Brand Sardines following undisclosed management issues.

=== Introduction of divisions ===
Due to the much bigger size of the league, divisions were introduced to divide the teams into the North and South Divisions. Teams still play a single round-robin tournament as part of the regular season, but the playoff format was changed to accommodate the new divisions. The top eight teams from each division would advance to an expanded playoff tournament. Similar to the National Basketball Association (NBA), the champions from each division would face once another in what is dubbed the "national finals".

=== Arenas ===
Expansion team
New arena

Team	Arena	Capacity
North Division
Bataan Risers	Bataan People's Center	4,000
Bulacan Kuyas	Baliwag Star Arena	5,000
Bulacan Kuyas	Bulacan Capitol Gymnasium	5,000
Caloocan Supremos	Caloocan Sports Complex	3,000
Makati Super Crunch	Ynares Sports Arena	3,000
Mandaluyong El Tigre	Jose Rizal University Gymnasium	1,000
Mandaluyong El Tigre	Ynares Sports Arena	3,000
Manila Stars	San Andres Sports Complex	3,000
Navotas Clutch	Navotas Sports Complex	1,000
Pampanga Lanterns	AUF Sports and Cultural Center	3,000
Pasay Voyagers	Cuneta Astrodome	12,000
Pasig Pirates	Pasig Sports Center	2,500
Quezon City Capitals	Blue Eagle Gym	7,500
Quezon City Capitals	Henry Noble Gymnasium	980
Quezon City Capitals	JCSGO Seed Dome	1,000
San Juan Knights	Filoil Flying V Centre	5,500
Valenzuela Classic	Valenzuela Astrodome	3,000
South Division
Bacoor City Strikers	Strike Gymansium	1,500
Basilan Steel	Lamitan Capitol Gymansium	3,000
Batangas City Athletics	Batangas City Sports Coliseum	4,000
Batangas City Athletics	Batangas State University Gymnasium	2,500
Batangas City Athletics	De La Salle Lipa SENTRUM	1,000
Cebu City Sharks	USJ–R Basak Coliseum	4,000
Cebu City Sharks	Hoops Dome	6,500
Davao Occidental Tigers	USeP Gymnasium and Cultural Center	6,000
Davao Occidental Tigers	Rizal Memorial Colleges Gymnasium	2,000
GenSan Warriors	Lagao Gymnasium	6,000
Imus Bandera	Imus City Sports Complex	1,000
Laguna Heroes	Alonte Sports Arena	6,500
Marikina Shoemasters	Marist School Gymnasium	2,500
Muntinlupa Cagers	Muntinlupa Sports Center	3,000
Parañaque Patriots	Olivarez College Gymnasium	3,500
Rizal Crusaders	Ynares Center	7,400
Zamboanga Family's Brand Sardines	Mayor Vitaliano D. Agan Coliseum	12,000
Neutral
Opening ceremonies	Smart Araneta Coliseum	25,000
All-Star Game	SM Mall of Asia Arena	15,000

=== Name changes ===
- The Bataan Defenders changed its name to Bataan Risers before the start of the season.
- The Makati Skyscrapers changed their team name to Makati Super Crunch in November 2018.
- The Valenzuela Classic its team name to Valenzuela Idol Cheesedogs in July 2018, but was later reverted back in November 2018.
- The Zamboanga Valientes changed its team name to Zamboanga Family's Brand Sardines in 2019.

=== Coaching changes ===
Off-season
Team	Outgoing coach	Incoming coach
Bulacan Kuyas	Chris Baluyot	Britt Reroma
Navotas Clutch	Elvis Tolentino	Richie Ticzon
Parañaque Patriots	Aric del Rosario	Eric Samson
Mid-season
Team	Outgoing coach	Incoming coach
Basilan Steel	Joseph Romarate	Jerson Cabiltes
Cebu City Sharks	Gilbert Castillo	Norberto Manalili
Imus Bandera	Jerry Codiñera; Mike Orquillas	Mike Orquillas; Noynoy Falcasantos
Laguna Heroes	Alex Angeles	Nath Gregorio
Mandaluyong El Tigre	Mac Cuan	Arlene Rodriguez
Muntinlupa Cagers	Aldrin Morante; Aldin Ayo	Aldin Ayo; Jack Azcueta
Navotas Clutch	Richie Ticzon	Gabby Severino
Pampanga Lanterns	Isaiah Duenas	Aldrin Morante
Bacoor Strikers	Budds Reyes	Leo Isaac
Pasig Pirates	James Machate	Ronjay Enrile
Parañaque Patriots	Eric Samson; Richie Melencio	Richie Melencio; Monel Kallos
Valenzuela Classic	Chris Gavina; Eric Samson	Eric Samson; Juven Formacil
Zamboanga Valientes	Ednie Morones	Raymund Valenzona

=== Roster regulation changes ===
To ensure that the league remains balanced, a new rule was added so that teams were limited to only one Filipino-foreigner per roster, that player must also not be taller than 6'4" (193 cm). The player is classified as Filipino-foreigner if the player is a Filipino of foreign descent, regardless of being a Philippine passport holder. The new rule, however, caused some criticism from fans and players alike.

== Regular season ==
=== Format ===
The 26 teams played in a single round-robin format, playing one game against all other teams in the league for a total of 25 games. In each gameday, a series of games is played in a designated home arena, with the home team usually playing in the final game.

The playoffs were expanded from eight teams to sixteen teams in this season. The top eight teams in each division advanced to a four-round, single-elimination playoffs, playing in best-of-three series in the first three rounds, and a best-of-five series in the national finals, with homecourt advantage alternating between the higher seeds of each series in the first two rounds.

=== Standings ===
==== North Division ====
Pos	Team	Pld	W	L	PCT	GB	Qualification
1	Bataan Risers	25	23	2	.920	—	Playoffs
2	Makati Super Crunch	25	21	4	.840	2	Playoffs
3	San Juan Knights	25	20	5	.800 (Note: San Juan wins tiebreaker over Manila by head-to-head victory.)	3	Playoffs
4	Manila Stars	25	20	5	.800	3	Playoffs
5	Bulacan Kuyas	25	14	11	.560	9	Playoffs
6	Navotas Clutch	25	12	13	.480 (Note: Navotas wins tiebreaker over Quezon City by head-to-head victory.)	11	Playoffs
7	Quezon City Capitals	25	12	13	.480	11	Playoffs
8	Caloocan Supremos	25	11	14	.440 (Note: Caloocan wins tiebreaker over Pampanga by head-to-head victory.)	12	Playoffs
9	Pampanga Lanterns	25	11	14	.440	12	
10	Valenzuela Classic	25	10	15	.400	13	
11	Mandaluyong El Tigre	25	8	17	.320 (Note: Mandaluyong wins tiebreaker over Pasay by head-to-head victory.)	15	
12	Pasay Voyagers	25	8	17	.320	15	
13	Pasig Pirates	25	4	21	.160	19	

Source: Standings
Rules for classification: 1) Wins; 2a) If two teams are tied, head-to-head match-up; 2b) If three or more teams are tied, head-to-head point quotient; 3) overall point quotient; 4) coin toss.

==== South Division ====
Pos	Team	Pld	W	L	PCT	GB	Qualification
1	Davao Occidental Tigers	25	20	5	.800	—	Playoffs
2	Batangas City Athletics	25	15	10	.600 (Note: Batangas City wins tiebreaker over Muntinlupa by head-to-head victory.)	5	Playoffs
3	Muntinlupa Cagers	25	15	10	.600	5	Playoffs
4	GenSan Warriors	25	14	11	.560	6	Playoffs
5	Bacoor City Strikers	25	13	12	.520	7	Playoffs
6	Zamboanga Family's Brand Sardines	25	12	13	.480	8	Playoffs
7	Imus Bandera	25	11	14	.440 (Note: Imus wins tiebreaker over Cebu City by head-to-head victory.)	9	Playoffs
8	Cebu City Sharks	25	11	14	.440	9	Playoffs
9	Laguna Heroes	25	10	15	.400	10	
10	Parañaque Patriots	25	8	17	.320 (Note: Parañaque wins tiebreaker over Marikina by head-to-head victory.)	12	
11	Marikina Shoemasters	25	8	17	.320	12	
12	Basilan Steel	25	7	18	.280 (Note: Basilan wins tiebreaker over Rizal by head-to-head victory.)	13	
13	Rizal Crusaders	25	7	18	.280	13	

Source: Standings
Rules for classification: 1) Wins; 2a) If two teams are tied, head-to-head match-up; 2b) If three or more teams are tied, head-to-head point quotient; 3) overall point quotient; 4) coin toss.

=== Results ===
Teams	BCR	BAS	BAN	BTG	BUL	CAL	CEB	DVO	GS	IMS	LAG	MKT	MDL	MNL	MAR	MUN	NAV	PAM	PAR	PSY	PSG	QC	RZL	SJ	VAL	ZAM
Bacoor City		79–67	75–84	62–70	76–77	86–68	76–71	50–69	71–82	90–79	91–86	67–73	61–83	92–86	85–87	83–97	81–75	80–81	81–82 (forfeited) (Note: Originally played on November 15, the game originally was an 82–81 Parañaque win. Due to a scoring error, the game would have been replayed at 81–81 in overtime, but Parañaque did not show up during the replay. Thus, the win was awarded to Bacoor City by forfeit.)	90–86	84–59	90–87	74–63	63–74	88–81	63–72
Basilan	—		77–108	94–89	57–59	92–84	86–76	61–86	81–83	108–113	62–80	65–77	70–68	67–79	82–85	75–99	97–102	88–78	89–84	66–69	77–102	68–74	94–90	84–95	94–96	80–94
Bataan	—	—		81–67	63–49	94–81	76–69	91–88	62–58	95–85	77–70	72–70	109–65	82–89	81–64	67–63	84–78	87–74	102–73	77–60	105–87	101–68	88–74	61–67	59–55	76–74
Batangas City	—	—	—		54–63	81–69	66–72	70–71	92–86	96–93	54–61	72–65	61–57	79–80	62–52	82–71	98–101**	75–80	71–57	60–57	69–62	95–90	92–90*	85–78	66–78	104–93
Bulacan	—	—	—	—		86–82	54–70	88–85*	43–56	117–113*	87–70	94–99	91–102	62–84	79–72	66–86	89–98	67–65	77–58	73–70	102–96	61–55	80–61	76–94	75–84	72–75
Caloocan	—	—	—	—	—		70–71	68–82	84–75	74–69	76–62	57–79	83–77	68–95	94–91	79–72	55–59	78–62	87–94	85–63	91–81	79–81	92–80	77–81	90–87	67–72
Cebu City	—	—	—	—	—	—		64–71	66–70	61–90	77–75**	70–66	63–72	76–107	78–74	80–73	73–83	69–68	73–81	76–61	56–53	68–75	57–80	62–71	78–75	58–61
Davao Occidental	—	—	—	—	—	—	—		83–84	75–71	72–66	77–79	86–63	88–89	80–68	88–82	72–59	82–77	92–82	68–61	88–82	90–78	84–74	87–75	92–85	93–68
General Santos	—	—	—	—	—	—	—	—		79–73	69–66	71–86	93–89	57–63	81–88	60–61	80–73	72–64	80–76	64–70	116–72	72–77	65–58	76–86	72–79	78–69
Imus	—	—	—	—	—	—	—	—	—		67–65	79–76	107–90	68–69	72–71	74–80	79–78	88–76	95–77	75–79	117–87	71–80	73–85	50–77	81–71	78–83
Laguna	—	—	—	—	—	—	—	—	—	—		65–76	76–72	74–68	63–61	95–94	74–61	58–75	76–52	72–76	83–75	80–85	79–80	56–81	74–66	80–86
Makati	—	—	—	—	—	—	—	—	—	—	—		79–63	99–98	90–71	52–50	96–87	69–67	75–50	67–59	76–71	102–78	66–55	78–73	67–64	77–65
Mandaluyong	—	—	—	—	—	—	—	—	—	—	—	—		73–92	62–76	74–86	59–55	85–90	77–75	70–74	98–55	76–86	65–51	60–76	64–78	71–61
Manila	—	—	—	—	—	—	—	—	—	—	—	—	—		91–89	100–86	92–96	100–75	98–88	115–85	111–98	76–71	71–70	80–84*	89–84	60–59
Marikina	—	—	—	—	—	—	—	—	—	—	—	—	—	—		76–85	80–76	76–91	68–71	71–69	71–67	78–74	69–75	65–77	99–102**	80–87
Muntinlupa	—	—	—	—	—	—	—	—	—	—	—	—	—	—	—		101–95	80–87	77–76	80–67	98–92*	97–100*	84–80	77–71	90–86	85–69
Navotas	—	—	—	—	—	—	—	—	—	—	—	—	—	—	—	—		88–89	90–83	83–75	97–70	120–105	87–81	74–81	72–70	78–89
Pampanga	—	—	—	—	—	—	—	—	—	—	—	—	—	—	—	—	—		82–79	86–83	67–69	97–94	76–85	70–93	82–90	87–85
Parañaque	—	—	—	—	—	—	—	—	—	—	—	—	—	—	—	—	—	—		73–69	87–69	64–65	59–47	77–87	76–73	68–58
Pasay	—	—	—	—	—	—	—	—	—	—	—	—	—	—	—	—	—	—	—		84–71	83–81	87–81	66–89	80–93	74–91
Pasig	—	—	—	—	—	—	—	—	—	—	—	—	—	—	—	—	—	—	—	–		98–95	81–78	60–87	88–95	78–92
Quezon City	—	—	—	—	—	—	—	—	—	—	—	—	—	—	—	—	—	—	—	—	—		81–79	50–68	76–72	109–81
Rizal	—	—	—	—	—	—	—	—	—	—	—	—	—	—	—	—	—	—	—	—	—	—		85–77	74–76	77–73
San Juan	—	—	—	—	—	—	—	—	—	—	—	—	—	—	—	—	—	—	—	—	—	—	—		102–83	80–59
Valenzuela	—	—	—	—	—	—	—	—	—	—	—	—	—	—	—	—	—	—	—	—	—	—	—	—		71–79
Zamboanga	—	—	—	—	—	—	—	—	—	—	—	—	—	—	—	—	—	—	—	—	—	—	—	—	—	

Source: Schedule
Legend: Blue = left column team win; Red = top row team win.
Matches with lighter background shading were decided after overtime.
Notes:

Not all games are in home–away format. Each team plays every team once. Number of asterisks after each score denotes number of overtimes played.

== Playoffs ==
Teams in bold advanced to the next round. The numbers to the left of each team indicate the team's seeding in its division, and the numbers to the right indicate the number of games the team won in that round. Teams with home court advantage, the higher seeded team, are shown in italics.

Division quarterfinals (best-of-3)	Division semifinals (best-of-3)
N1	**Bataan**	**2**
N8	Caloocan	0
N1	Bataan	1
N4	**Manila**	**2**
N4	**Manila**	**2**
N5	Bulacan	0
**North Division**
N2	Makati	0
N7	**Quezon City**	**2**
N7	Quezon City	0
N3	**San Juan**	**2**
N3	**San Juan**	**2**
N6	Navotas	0
S1	**Davao Occidental**	**2**
S8	Cebu City	0
S1	**Davao Occidental**	**2**
S5	Bacoor City	0
S4	General Santos	0
S5	**Bacoor City**	**2**
**South Division**
S2	**Batangas City**	**2**
S7	Imus	1
S2	**Batangas City**	**2**
S6	Zamboanga	1
S3	Muntinlupa	1
S6	**Zamboanga**	**2**

Division finals (best-of-3)
N4	Manila	1
N3	**San Juan**	**2**
S1	**Davao Occidental**	**2**
S2	Batangas City	1

National finals (best-of-5)
N3	**San Juan**	**3**
S1	Davao Occidental	2

=== First round ===
In the first round, the first- and second-seeded teams host games 1 and 3 of its respective division, while the third- and fourth-seeded teams host game 2.

==== North Division first round ====
Team 1	Series	Team 2	Game 1	Game 2	Game 3
**(1) Bataan Risers**	2–0	(8) Caloocan Supremos	**91**–71	**83**–71	—
(2) Makati Super Crunch	0–2	**(7) Quezon City Capitals**	77–**88**	74–**77**	—
**(3) San Juan Knights**	2–0	(6) Navotas Clutch	**81**–76	**75**–69	—
**(4) Manila Stars**	2–0	(5) Bulacan Kuyas	**69**–65	**92**–83	—

==== South Division first round ====
Team 1	Series	Team 2	Game 1	Game 2	Game 3
**(1) Davao Occidental Tigers**	2–0	(8) Cebu City Sharks	**82**–67	**76**–69	—
**(2) Batangas City Athletics**	2–1	(7) Imus Bandera	**77**–69	69–**75**	**92**–65
(3) Muntinlupa Cagers	1–2	**(6) Zamboanga Family's Brand Sardines**	**89**–78	73–**84**	83–**87**
(4) General Santos Warriors	0–2	**(5) Bacoor Strikers**	80–**90**	78–**92**	—

=== Division semifinals ===
In the Division Semifinals, the highest seeded team hosts games 1 and 3, while the second-highest seeded team hosts game 2.

==== North Division semifinals ====
Team 1	Series	Team 2	Game 1	Game 2	Game 3
(1) Bataan Risers	1–2	**(4) Manila Stars**	**73**–72	76–**80**	51-**56**
**(3) San Juan Knights**	2–0	(7) Quezon City Capitals	**94**–86	**106**–81	—

==== South Division semifinals ====
Due to Davao Occidental advancing after game 2, Batangas City instead hosted game 3.

Team 1	Series	Team 2	Game 1	Game 2	Game 3
**(1) Davao Occidental Tigers**	2–0	(5) Bacoor Strikers	**79**–71	**87**–67	—
**(2) Batangas City Athletics**	2–1	(6) Zamboanga Family's Brand Sardines	58–**72**	**67**–57	**80**–72

=== Division finals ===
In the Division Finals, the higher-seeded team hosts games 1 and 3 in its respective division, while the lower-seeded team hosts game 2.

==== North Division finals ====
Team 1	Series	Team 2	Game 1	Game 2	Game 3
**(3) San Juan Knights**	2–1	(4) Manila Stars	88–**91**	**92**–90	**83**–74

==== South Division finals ====
Team 1	Series	Team 2	Game 1	Game 2	Game 3
**(1) Davao Occidental Tigers**	2–1	(2) Batangas City Athletics	**66**–48	74–**76**	**66**–51

=== MPBL finals ===
In the MPBL finals, the higher-seeded team hosts games 1, 2, and 5, while the lower-seeded team hosts games 3 and 4.

Both teams finished the season 20–5, but the Davao Occidental Tigers held the homecourt advantage for the finals, as they have defeated San Juan in their regular season matchup, but the San Juan Knights eventually won the championship in 5 games.

Team 1	Series	Team 2	Game 1	Game 2	Game 3	Game 4	Game 5
(S1) Davao Occidental Tigers	2–3	**(N3) San Juan Knights**	74–**84**	**67**–60	62–**67**	**77**–66	86–**87**

== All-Star Game ==
2019 MPBL All-Star Game
North All-Stars	South All-Stars
84	109
Head coach: Jojo Lastimosa (Bataan Risers)	Head coach: Don Dulay (Davao Occidental Tigers)
	1	2	3	4	Total
North All-Stars	21	23	20	20	84
South All-Stars	21	20	38	30	109
- Date: March 2, 2019
- Venue: SM Mall of Asia Arena, Pasay
- MVP: Jeff Viernes

The 2019 MPBL All-Star Game was an exhibition game played on March 2, 2019. It was the inaugural edition of the MPBL All-Star Game, which took place at SM Mall of Asia Arena in Pasay.

The South Division prevailed over the North Division with a score of 109–84. Jeff Viernes was declared the All-Star Game MVP.

=== Lineups ===
North All-Stars
Pos	Player	Team
Starters
	Cedric Ablaza	Makati Super Crunch
	Mark Andaya	Pasig Pirates
	Mike Ayonayon	San Juan Knights
	Gary David	Bataan Risers
	Aris Dionisio	Manila Stars
Reserves
	Gian Abrigo	Mandaluyong El Tigre
	Jaypee Belencion	Pasay Voyagers
	Chris Bitoon	Manila Stars
	Jay Collado	Quezon City Capitals
	Marlon Gomez	Navotas Clutch
	Levi Hernandez	Pampanga Lanterns
	Paulo Hubalde	Valenzuela Classic
	Larry Rodriguez	San Juan Knights
	Jay-R Taganas	Bulacan Kuyas
	Almond Vosotros	Caloocan Supremos
Head coach: Jojo Lastimosa (Bataan Risers)

South All-Stars
Pos	Player	Team
Starters
	Gerald Anderson	Marikina Shoemasters
	Gab Banal	Bacoor City Strikers
	Jhaymo Eguilos	Batangas City Athletics
	Allan Mangahas	Muntinlupa Cagers
	Mark Yee	Davao Occidental Tigers
Reserves
	Marco Balagtas	Rizal Crusaders
	Patrick Cabahug	Cebu City Sharks
	Cris Masaglang	GenSan Warriors
	Paulo Castro	Parañaque Patriots
	Reed Juntilla	Zamboanga Family's Brand Sardines
	Michael Mabulac	Laguna Heroes
	Ian Melencio	Imus Bandera
	Leo Najorda	Davao Occidental Tigers
	Jojo Tangkay	Basilan Steel
	Jeff Viernes	Batangas City Athletics
Head coach: Don Dulay (Davao Occidental)

=== Game ===
S+A

March 2, 2019

North All-Stars	84–109	South All-Stars
Scoring by quarter: 21–21, 23–20, 20–38, 20–30
Pts: Chris Bitoon 11		Pts: Jeff Viernes 19

Mall of Asia Arena, Pasay

=== Pre-game events ===
Before the game itself, multiple pre-game events were held. These include the Executives' Game, 2-Ball Challenge, Three-Point Shootout, and Slam Dunk Competition. The champions of these events are as follows:

- Executives' Game Champions: North Division Executives
- 2-Ball Challenge Champions: Pamboy Raymundo and Byron Villarias (Bataan Risers)
- Three-Point Shootout Champion: Gary David (Bataan Risers)
- Slam Dunk Competition Champion: David Carlos (Makati Super Crunch)

== Statistics ==
=== Individual statistic leaders ===
Category	Player	Team	Statistic
Points per game	Almond Vosotros	Caloocan Supremos	20.33
Total Rebounds per game	JR Taganas	Bulacan Kuyas	12.64
Assists per game	Paolo Hubalde	Valenzuela Classic	8.48
Steals per game	Paolo Hubalde	Valenzuela Classic	2.8
Blocks per game	Aris Dionisio	Manila Stars	2.17
Turnovers per game	Bonbon Custodio	Davao Occidental Tigers	4.4
Fouls per game	Chad Alonzo	Bacoor City Strikers	3.57
Minutes per game	Paolo Castro	Parañaque Patriots	33.58
FG%	Art Patrick Aquino	San Juan Knights	59.0%
FT%	Eric Dela Cuesta	Rizal Crusaders	91.0%
3FG%	Nico Abatayo	Batangas City Athletics	67.0%
Double-doubles	Harold Miguel Arboleda	Parañaque Patriots	7
Triple-doubles	Gab Banal	Bacoor Strikers	3

=== Individual game highs ===
Category	Player	Team	Statistic
Points	Leomer Losentes	GenSan Warriors	41
Rebounds	JR Taganas	Bulacan Kuyas	26
Assists	Allan Mangahas	Muntinlupa Cagers	17
Steals	Warren Ybanez	Marikina Shoemasters	8
Blocks	Eduardo Doroteo	Pasig Pirates	7
Three-pointers	Yves Sazon	Marikina Shoemasters	7

== Awards ==
=== Individual season awards ===
Most of the league's individual awards made their debut this season, which were given out before game 4 of the 2019 national finals at the Filoil Flying V Centre in San Juan. The Finals Most Valuable Player and Coach of the Year were given out at the conclusion of the series.

Award	Recipient	Team
Most Valuable Player	Gab Banal	Bacoor City Strikers
Finals Most Valuable Player	Mike Ayonayon	San Juan Knights
Defensive Player of the Year	Aris Dionisio	Manila Stars
Coach of the Year	Randy Alcantara	San Juan Knights
Executive of the Year	Oscar Malapitan	Caloocan Supremos
Sportsmanship award	Jay-R Taganas	Bulacan Kuyas

=== All-MPBL teams ===
This was the first season in which the league honored its best players with All-MPBL Teams.

All-MPBL First Team
Player	Team
Mark Yee	Davao Occidental Tigers
Gab Banal	Bacoor City Strikers
Aris Dionisio	Manila Stars
Chris Bitoon	Manila Stars
Allan Mangahas	Muntinlupa Cagers

All-MPBL Second Team
Player	Team
John Wilson	San Juan Knights
Michael Mabulac	Laguna Heroes
Jai Reyes	Navotas Clutch
Harold Arboleda	Zamboanga Valientes
Leo Najorda	Davao Occidental Tigers

=== Players of the Week ===
Alongside the multitude of new awards, the league also began honoring its best players for each week of the regular season.

Week	Player	Ref.
June 12−16, 2018	Reed Juntilla (Zamboanga Valientes)	
June 19−23, 2018	Christopher Sumalinog (Bacoor City Strikers)	
June 26–30, 2018	Jai Reyes (Laguna Heroes)	
July 3–6, 2018	Bobby Ray Parks Jr. (Mandaluyong El Tigre)	
July 10–12, 2018	Mar Villahermosa (Caloocan Supremos)	
July 16–21, 2018	Michael Juico (Pampanga Lanterns)	
July 31 – August 4, 2018	Mikee Reyes (Bacoor City Strikers)	
August 7–11, 2018	Reed Juntilla (Zamboanga Valientes)	
August 14–16, 2018	Gab Banal (Bacoor City Strikers)	
August 21–25, 2018	Allan Mangahas (Muntinlupa Cagers)	
August 28 – September 1, 2018	Billy Ray Robles (Davao Occidental Tigers)	
September 4–8, 2018	Allan Mangahas (Muntinlupa Cagers)	
September 11–13, 2018	Aris Dionisio (Manila Stars)	
September 19–23, 2018	Mark Yee (Davao Occidental Tigers)	
September 25–29, 2018	Mark Yee (Davao Occidental Tigers)	
October 2–6, 2018	Gab Banal (Bacoor City Strikers)	
October 9–13, 2018	Jan Jamon (Pasay Voyagers)	
October 16–20, 2018	Bobby Balucanag (Pasay Voyagers)	
October 22–27, 2018	Paulo Hubalde (Valenzuela Idol Cheesedogs)	
October 30 – November 3, 2018	Jeff Viernes (Batangas City Athletics)	
January 3–5, 2019	Renato Ular (Marikina Shoemasters)	
January 7–12, 2019	Mac Cardona (San Juan Knights)	
February 11–16, 2019	Mark Andaya (Pasig Pirates)	

== Notable events ==
=== Events ===
- March 11, 2019 – The Bacoor City–Parañaque replay was forfeited in Bacoor City's favor, marking the first time in which a game was forfeited in any manner.

== Media ==
This season marked the second of three years of ABS-CBN's broadcasting rights of the league, as games were aired on S+A channel. In addition, Fox Sports Philippines started broadcasting games this season. The league also began streaming all of its games on its official Facebook page.
