= 2022 MPBL season =

4th season of the Maharlika Pilipinas Basketball League

- League: Maharlika Pilipinas Basketball League
- Sport: Basketball
- Duration: Regular season: April 25 – October 13, 2022; Playoffs: October 15 – November 26, 2022; Finals: December 2 – 12, 2022
- Games: 231 (regular season)
- Teams: 22
- TV partner(s): Cignal TV (One PH, One Sports+) iWantTFC

Regular season
- Top seed: Nueva Ecija Rice Vanguards
- Season MVP: Jaycee Marcelino (Zamboanga)

Playoffs
- North Division champions: Nueva Ecija Rice Vanguards
- North Division runners-up: San Juan Knights
- South Division champions: Zamboanga Family's Brand Sardines
- South Division runners-up: Batangas City Embassy Chill

Finals
- Champions: Nueva Ecija Rice Vanguards
- Runners-up: Zamboanga Family's Brand Sardines
- Finals MVP: Byron Villarias (Nueva Ecija)

MPBL seasons
- ← 2019–20 2023 →

The 2022 MPBL season was the fourth season of the Maharlika Pilipinas Basketball League (MPBL) and the first as a professional league. The regular season began on April 25, 2022, with opening ceremonies at the Batangas City Sports Coliseum in Batangas City, Batangas, and ended on October 13. The 2022 MPBL All-Star Game was also held at the Batangas City Coliseum on October 2. The playoffs then began on October 15 and ended on December 12 when the Nueva Ecija Rice Vanguards defeated the Zamboanga Family's Brand Sardines in four games in the 2022 MPBL finals.

This season featured 22 teams, the first time the number of teams decreased from the previous season, as nine teams departed from the league.

This season also marked the first season of a partnership with sports betting platform OKBet as title sponsor of the league.

== Background ==
This was the MPBL's first full season following the events of the COVID-19 pandemic in the Philippines, which caused the league's year-long suspension last season. Before the pandemic, the league was going to schedule a 2020–21 season for its fourth running beginning on June 12, 2020, but those plans were cancelled, and the fourth season was then moved to June 12, 2021. The June 2021 opening, however, didn't push through due to the prevailing restrictions, and the opening was postponed to the third quarter of 2021.

On November 9, 2021, the MPBL announced that the league would be given professional status, which was granted by the Games and Amusement Board one month later. League commissioner Kenneth Duremdes then announced that the season opener is once again postponed to 2022. To make up for the long gap, Duremdes also announced that an invitational tournament would be held in December 2021 to help teams prepare for the then-upcoming season.

== Teams ==
=== Team changes ===
This season saw the departure of nine teams. The Basilan Steel and Davao Occidental Tigers moved to other leagues while the Bicol Volcanoes, Bulacan Kuyas, Cebu Casino Ethyl Alcohol, Navotas Uni-Pak Sardines, Iloilo United Royals, Parañaque Patriots, and Pasay Voyagers all became inactive. The Negros Muscovados took part in the 2021 Invitational, but did not return for the regular season. This brought the team lineup down to 22 teams, the first time the league has contracted in size. It was also the first time there were no expansion teams. To balance the divisions, the Rizal Golden Coolers were realigned back to the South Division.

=== Arenas ===
Team switched divisions
New arena

Team	Arena	Capacity
North Division
Bataan Risers	Orion Sports Complex	N/A
Caloocan Excellence	Caloocan Sports Complex	3,000
Makati × MNL Kingpin	No home games	
Manila Stars	Paco Arena	1,000
Manila Stars	San Andres Sports Complex	3,000
Marikina Shoemasters	No home games	
Nueva Ecija Rice Vanguards	Nueva Ecija Coliseum	3,000
Pampanga Giant Lanterns	Bren Z. Guiao Convention Center	3,000
Pasig City MCW Sports	Ynares Sports Arena	3,000
Quezon City MG	No home games	
San Juan Knights	Filoil EcoOil Centre	6,000
Valenzuela XUR Homes Realty Inc.	Bahayang Pag-asa Sports Complex	N/A
South Division
Bacolod Bingo Plus	La Salle Coliseum	8,000
Bacoor City Strikers	Strike Gymansium	1,500
Batangas City Embassy Chill	Batangas City Sports Coliseum	4,000
GenSan Warriors	Lagao Gymnasium	6,000
Imus City Bandera	No home games	
Laguna Heroes	Alonte Sports Arena	6,500
Laguna Heroes	Laguna Sports Complex	2,500
Mindoro Tamaraws	No home games	
Muntinlupa Cagers	Muntinlupa Sports Center	3,000
Rizal Golden Coolers	Ynares Center	7,400
Sarangani Marlins	Sarangani Capitol Gymnasium	N/A
Zamboanga Family's Brand Sardines	Mayor Vitaliano D. Agan Coliseum	12,000
Neutral
–	Marikina Sports Center^{[N]}	7,000
–	San Jose del Monte Sports Complex	N/A

Notes

- ^{N} Despite the presence of the Marikina Shoemasters, the arena was not used by the team during the season.

=== Name changes ===
- The Biñan City Luxxe White changed its name back to Laguna Heroes during the 2021 Invitational.
- The Caloocan Supremos changed its team name to Caloocan Excellence during the 2021 Invitational.
- The Bacolod Master Sardines changed its name to Bacolod Bingo Plus before the start of the season.
- The Batangas City Athletics changed its name to Batangas City Embassy Chill before the start of the season.
- The Imus Bandera - Luxxe Slim changed its name to Imus City Bandera before the start of the season.
- The Makati Super Crunch changed its name to Makati × MNL Kingpin before the start of the season.
- The Mindoro Tamaraws changed its name to Mindoro Tams before the start of the season.
- The Valenzuela Classic changed its name to Valenzuela XUR Homes Realty Inc. before the start of the season.
- The Pasig Sta. Lucia Realtors changed its name to Pasig City before the start of the season, then later as Pasig City MCW Sports before the playoffs.

=== Coaching changes ===
Off-season / Mid-season
Team	Outgoing coach	Incoming coach
1Bataan Risers	Jonas Villanueva; JR Villanueva	JR Villanueva; Ricky Dandan
Bacolod Bingo Plus	Vic Ycasiano	Alexander Angeles
Bacoor City Strikers	Chris Gavina; Rey Mendez	Rey Mendez; Willie Generalao
Batangas City Embassy Chill	Woody Co	Pocholo Villanueva
Caloocan Excellence	John Kallos; Rene Baena	Rene Baena; Ronnie Dojillo
GenSan Warriors	Ronnie Dojillo	Marlon Martin
Imus Bandera	Raymund Valenzona; Manuel Torralba Jr.	Manuel Torralba Jr. Renniel Cabrera
Laguna Heroes	Dennis Miranda	Nath Gregorio
Makati × MNL Kingpin	Beaujing Acot	Vis Valencia
Manila Stars	Tino Pinat	Maximino Dayandante Jr.
Mindoro Tams	Justin Tan; Drake Santos	Drake Santos; Jonathan Reyes
Muntinlupa Cagers	Bonnie Garcia; Jules Hidalgo	Jules Hidalgo; Vincent Salvador
Nueva Ecija Rice Vanguards	Charles Tiu	Jerson Cabiltes
Pampanga Giant Lanterns	Bong Ramos; Jordan Viray	Jordan Viray; Dennis Pineda
Pasig City MCW Sports	Bong Dela Cruz	Ogie Gumatay
Quezon City MG	Christian Coronel	Alvin Grey
Rizal Golden Coolers	Jayvee Gayoso	Jonathan Banal
Sarangani Marlins	Manuel Torralba	John Kallos
Valenzuela XUR Homes Realty Inc.	Ronjay Enrile; Aldrin Morante	Aldrin Morante; Lester Alvarez
Zamboanga Family's Brand Sardines	Britt Reroma	Vic Ycasiano

=== Roster regulation changes ===
Since the MPBL became a professional league, multiple changes were made to the roster regulations:

- Teams are now allowed to sign up to five collegiate players into the roster. The only requirement is for the player to be given a Special Guest License from the Games and Amusement Board (GAB).
- The ex-professional player limit was replaced by an ex-PBA player limit. Still, teams are only allowed to sign seven players with previous experience in the Philippine Basketball Association.
- The classification for Filipino-foreigners was changed, with the only requirement is for the player to be a holder of a Philippine passport. The 6'4" height limit was also removed.
- The maximum number of players per roster was increased from 20 to 24 to accommodate the bigger pool of players.

== Pre-season ==
The 2022 MPBL season was preceded by the 2021 MPBL Invitational which ran from December 11 to 23, 2021, at the SM Mall of Asia Arena in Pasay. The tournament was won by the Basilan Jumbo Plastic. Philip Manalang was awarded the Finals MVP after making a game-winning buzzer beater to lift Basilan over the Nueva Ecija Rice Vanguards, 83–80.

== Regular season ==
=== Opening ceremony ===
The opening ceremony was held on April 25, 2022, at the Batangas City Coliseum in Batangas City, Batangas, the home arena of the Batangas City Embassy Chill.

=== Format ===
The 22 teams played in a single round-robin format, playing one game against all other teams in the league for a total of 21 games. In each gameday, a series of games is played in a designated home arena, with the home team usually playing in the final game.

The top eight teams in each division advanced to a four-round, single-elimination playoffs, playing in best-of-three series in the first three rounds, and a best-of-five series in the national finals, with homecourt advantage alternating between the higher seeds of each series in the first two rounds.

The league also changed the ranking system this season, using wins instead of win percentage.

=== Standings ===
==== North Division ====
Pos	Team	Pld	W	L	GB	Qualification
1	Nueva Ecija Rice Vanguards	21	21	0	—	Playoffs
2	Pasig City MCW Sports	21	14 (Note: Pasig (1.193), San Juan (0.993), and Pampanga (0.850) are ranked based on head-to-head point quotient.)	7	7	Playoffs
3	San Juan Knights	21	14	7	7	Playoffs
4	Pampanga Giant Lanterns	21	14	7	7	Playoffs
5	Bataan Risers	21	13	8	8	Playoffs
6	Valenzuela XUR Homes Realty Inc.	21	10	11	11	Playoffs
7	Quezon City MG	21	9	12	12	Playoffs
8	Marikina Shoemasters	21	8	13	13	Playoffs
9	Caloocan Excellence	21	6 (Note: Caloocan wins tiebreaker over Manila by head-to-head victory.)	15	15	
10	Manila Stars	21	6	15	15	
11	Makati × MNL Kingpin	21	2	19	19	

Source: Standings
Rules for classification: 1) Wins; 2a) If two teams are tied, head-to-head match-up; 2b) If three or more teams are tied, head-to-head point quotient; 3) overall point quotient; 4) coin toss.

==== South Division ====
Pos	Team	Pld	W	L	GB	Qualification
1	Zamboanga Family's Brand Sardines	21	18	3	—	Playoffs
2	Batangas City Embassy Chill	21	17	4	1	Playoffs
3	Sarangani Marlins	21	16	5	2	Playoffs
4	GenSan Warriors	21	15	6	3	Playoffs
5	Bacolod Bingo Plus	21	14	7	4	Playoffs
6	Rizal Golden Coolers	21	10	11	8	Playoffs
7	Bacoor City Strikers	21	9	12	9	Playoffs
8	Muntinlupa Cagers	21	6	15	12	Playoffs
9	Imus City Bandera	21	5	16	13	
10	Laguna Heroes	21	3	18	15	
11	Mindoro Tams	21	1	20	17	

Source: Standings
Rules for classification: 1) Wins; 2a) If two teams are tied, head-to-head match-up; 2b) If three or more teams are tied, head-to-head point quotient; 3) overall point quotient; 4) coin toss.

=== Results ===
Teams	BCD	BCR	BAN	BTG	CAL	GS	IMS	LAG	MKT	MNL	MAR	MDR	MUN	NE	PAM	PSG	QC	RZL	SJ	SAR	VAL	ZAM
Bacolod		69–58	56–60	66–72	95–84	73–76	67–57	77–57	77–69	76–59	76–66	94–68	93–83	74–81***	70–72	71–70	79–64	57–67	67–66	89–74	68–67	71–74
Bacoor			76–74	86–87	85–82	74–75	73–68	69–57	84–56	102–65	82–89	65–70	64–65	76–87	58–70	78–82	96–77	77–81	69–66	83–92	93–83	67–71
Bataan				70–68	66–65	81–76	74–67	79–70	81–77	109–102	84–68	112–76	91–83	65–79	83–86	69–71	89–91	69–65	74–90	80–92	99–96**	59–78
Batangas City					82–86	68–62	76–56	96–55	93–59	67–61	99–91	86–62	85–81	72–84	57–62	67–60	85–60	68–65	70–69	75–66	77–62	87–83*
Caloocan						62–71	85–88	82–76	74–82	80–69	88–92	71–63	79–69	86–103	78–95	82–96	78–81	95–87	68–73	76–81	78–87	70–91
General Santos							73–65	84–49	89–65	96–83	78–77	105–64	96–87	83–95	77–73	61–51	114–83	80–67	79–69	77–79*	69–80	73–75
Imus City								68–70	72–44	97–91	76–89	104–61	84–94	81–107	62–83	55–63	56–60	91–74	57–86	78–79	84–85	67–82
Laguna									80–49	74–85	83–90	82–74	67–82	79–109	68–75	58–74	92–113	76–96	68–78	59–69	73–92	46–81
Makati										74–80	70–81	82–78	79–90	43–84	54–91	76–78	72–103	73–95	85–95	59–70	52–56	61–99
Manila											77–78	84–67	103–74	58–85	70–72	70–75	86–76	61–66	73–94	55–74	70–79	87–79
Marikina												101–60	64–69	77–99	77–95	79–81	79–92	86–85	67–81	69–73	48–66	76–91
Mindoro													55–91	68–98	54–88	75–87	83–88	82–100	64–146	74–125	67–79	70–110
Muntinlupa														85–102	76–110	89–92	77–79	67–71	56–84	55–67	80–85	77–80
Nueva Ecija															80–74	77–66	93–77	83–64	81–75	87–79	68–61	81–76
Pampanga																71–93	107–103*	65–76	71–74	65–68	84–62	72–83
Pasig City																	73–76	89–87	68–64	76–93	71–58	71–98
Quezon City																		70–71	69–78	67–90	74–90	71–96
Rizal																			79–89	83–94	82–79	73–74
San Juan																				86–74	90–74	89–95*
Sarangani																					77–73	86–89*
Valenzuela																						82–86*
Zamboanga																						

Source: Standings
Legend: Blue = left column team win; Red = top row team win.
Matches with lighter background shading were decided after overtime.

Not all games are in home–away format. Each team plays every team once. Number of asterisks after each score denotes number of overtimes played.

== Playoffs ==
Teams in bold advanced to the next round. The numbers to the left of each team indicate the team's seeding in its division, and the numbers to the right indicate the number of games the team won in that round. Teams with home-court advantage, the higher-seeded team, are shown in italics.

=== Bracket ===
Division quarterfinals (best-of-3)	Division semifinals (best-of-3)
N1	**Nueva Ecija**	**2**
N8	Marikina	0
N1	**Nueva Ecija**	**2**
N4	Pampanga	0
N4	**Pampanga**	**2**
N5	Bataan	1
**North Division**
N2	**Pasig**	**2**
N7	Quezon City	0
N2	Pasig	0
N3	**San Juan**	**2**
N3	**San Juan**	**2**
N6	Valenzuela	0
S1	**Zamboanga**	**2**
S8	Muntinlupa	0
S1	**Zamboanga**	**2**
S5	Bacolod	1
S4	General Santos	1
S5	**Bacolod**	**2**
**South Division**
S2	**Batangas City**	**2**
S7	Bacoor City	1
S2	**Batangas City**	**2**
S6	Rizal	0
S3	Sarangani	0
S6	**Rizal**	**2**

Division finals (best-of-3)
N1	**Nueva Ecija**	**2**
N3	San Juan	1
S1	**Zamboanga**	**2**
S2	Batangas City	1

National finals (best-of-5)
N1	**Nueva Ecija**	**3**
S1	Zamboanga	1

=== First Round ===
In the First Round, the first- and second-seeded teams host games 1 and 3 of its respective division, while the third- and fourth-seeded teams host game 2.

==== North Division First Round ====
Due to Nueva Ecija, Pasig City, and San Juan all advancing after game 2, Pampanga instead hosted game 3.

Team 1	Series	Team 2	Game 1	Game 2	Game 3
**(1) Nueva Ecija Rice Vanguards**	2–0	(8) Marikina Shoemasters	**103**–71	**82**–71	—
**(2) Pasig City MCW Sports**	2–0	(7) Quezon City MG	**84**–80 (OT)	**101**–83	—
**(3) San Juan Knights**	2–0	(6) Valenzuela XUR Homes Realty Inc.	**90**–82	**90**–79	—
**(4) Pampanga Giant Lanterns**	2–1	(5) Bataan Risers	**82**–75	83–**85** (OT)	**66**–62

==== South Division First Round ====
Team 1	Series	Team 2	Game 1	Game 2	Game 3
**(1) Zamboanga Family's Brand Sardines**	2–0	(8) Muntinlupa Cagers	**79**–50	**77**–71	—
**(2) Batangas City Embassy Chill**	2–1	(7) Bacoor City Strikers	**69**–55	75–**78**	**70**–57
(3) Sarangani Marlins	0–2	**(6) Rizal EMKAI Xentromall**	45–**73**	79–**82** (OT)	—
(4) GenSan Warriors	1–2	**(5) Bacolod Bingo Plus**	77–**81**	**77**–72	73–**77**

=== Division semifinals ===
In the division semifinals, the highest seeded team hosts games 1 and 3, while the second-highest seeded team hosts game 2.

==== North Division semifinals ====
Team 1	Series	Team 2	Game 1	Game 2	Game 3
**(1) Nueva Ecija Rice Vanguards**	2–0	(4) Pampanga Giant Lanterns	**104**–89	**89**–84	—
(2) Pasig City MCW Sports	0–2	**(3) San Juan Knights**	68–**88**	70–**81**	—

==== South Division semifinals ====
Team 1	Series	Team 2	Game 1	Game 2	Game 3
**(1) Zamboanga Family's Brand Sardines**	2–1	(5) Bacolod Bingo Plus	**71**–65	58–**61**	**77**–65
**(2) Batangas City Embassy Chill**	2–0	(6) Rizal EMKAI Xentromall	**70**–60	**72**–66	—

=== Division finals ===
In the division finals, the higher-seeded team hosts games 1 and 3 in its respective division, while the lower-seeded team hosts game 2.

==== North Division finals ====
Team 1	Series	Team 2	Game 1	Game 2	Game 3
**(1) Nueva Ecija Rice Vanguards**	2–1	(3) San Juan Knights	72–**79**	**89**–83 (OT)	**84**–68

==== South Division finals ====
Team 1	Series	Team 2	Game 1	Game 2	Game 3
**(1) Zamboanga Family's Brand Sardines**	2–1	(2) Batangas City Embassy Chill	71–**80**	**63**–53	**67**–66

=== MPBL finals ===
In the MPBL finals, the higher-seeded team hosts games 1, 2, and 5, while the lower-seeded team hosts games 3 and 4.

Team 1	Series	Team 2	Game 1	Game 2	Game 3	Game 4	Game 5
**(N1) Nueva Ecija Rice Vanguards**	3–1	(S1) Zamboanga Family's Brand Sardines	**81**–75	**75**–74	65–**75**	**69**–56	—

== All-Star Game ==
2022 MPBL All-Star Game
North All-Stars	South All-Stars
92	109
Head coach: Jerson Cabiltes (Nueva Ecija Rice Vanguards)	Head coach: Cholo Villanueva (Batangas City Embassy Chill)
	1	2	3	4	Total
North All-Stars	28	26	21	17	92
South All-Stars	21	22	33	33	109
- Date: October 2, 2022
- Venue: Batangas City Coliseum, Batangas City, Batangas
- MVP: Jaycee Marcelino

The 2022 MPBL All-Star Game was an exhibition game played on October 2, 2022. It was the third edition of the MPBL All-Star Game, which took place at the Batangas City Coliseum in Batangas City, Batangas, the home venue of the Batangas City Embassy Chill, making it the first All-Star Game to be held in a team's designated home venue.

For the third consecutive season, South Division won against the North Division with a score of 109–92. Jaycee Marcelino was declared the All-Star Game MVP.

=== Lineups ===
Due to the league's contraction to 22 teams, the league only placed thirteen players on each division's roster instead of fifteen. 15-man rosters would be used again in the following edition.

Cedric Ablaza of the Batangas City Embassy Chill and Mark Yee of Bacolod Bingo Plus earned their third all-star selections while Michael Mabulac of the Nueva Ecija Rice Vanguards, Cris Masaglang of the GenSan Warriors, and Leo Najorda of the Imus City Bandera made their second all-star appearances.

North All-Stars
Pos	Player	Team	No. of selections
Starters
F	Arvie Bringas	Bataan Risers	1
F	Archie Concepcion	Pampanga Giant Lanterns	1
G	Judel Fuentes	San Juan Knights	1
G	Carlo Lastimosa	Pasig City	1
C	Michael Mabulac	Nueva Ecija Rice Vanguards	2
Reserves
F	Bobby Balucanag	Nueva Ecija Rice Vanguards	1
G	Genmar Bragais	Quezon City MG	1
G	James Castro	Bataan Risers	1
F	Jaymar Gimpayan	Valenzuela XUR Homes Realty Inc.	1
G	Lorenzo Joson	Marikina Shoemasters	1
F	Damian Lasco	Caloocan Excellence	1
F	Ronnie Matias	Manila Stars	1
G	Carlos Morales	Makati × MNL Kingpin	1
Head coach: Jerson Cabiltes (Nueva Ecija Rice Vanguards)

South All-Stars
Pos	Player	Team	No. of selections
Starters
F	Cedrick Ablaza	Batangas City Embassy Chill	3
G	Kyt Jimenez	Sarangani Marlins	1
G	Jaycee Marcelino	Zamboanga Family's Brand Sardines	1
F	Nikko Panganiban	GenSan Warriors	1
C	Mark Yee	Bacolod Bingo Plus	3
Reserves
G	VJ Alarcon	Batangas City Embassy Chill	1
G	Biboy Enguio	Muntinlupa Cagers	1
F	Troy Mallillin	Rizal Golden Coolers	1
G	Cris Masaglang	GenSan Warriors	2
F	Mark Montuano	Bacoor City Strikers	1
F	Leo Najorda	Imus City Bandera	2
F	Khen Osicos	Mindoro Tams	1
G	Paolo Pontejos	Laguna Heroes	1
Head coach: Cholo Villanueva (Batangas City Embassy Chill)

=== Game ===
One PH

October 2

North All-Stars	92–109	South All-Stars
Scoring by quarter: 28–21, 26–22, 21–33, 17–33

Batangas City Coliseum, Batangas City

=== Pre-game events ===
Before the game itself, a series of pre-game events was held. Returning events include the Three-Point Shootout and Slam Dunk Contest. The Executives' Game also returns after the event's absence last season.

- Executives' Game Champion: N/A (tied game)
- Three-point Shootout Champion: Domark Matillano (Muntinlupa Cagers)
- Slam Dunk Contest Champion: Garex Puerto (Imus City Bandera)

== Records and Milestones ==
=== Records ===
- October 7, 2022 – The Nueva Ecija Rice Vanguards beat the Batangas City Embassy Chill to become the first team in league history to go undefeated in the regular season.
- October 10, 2022 – Kyt Jimenez of the Sarangani Marlins completed a quadruple-double against the Mindoro Tams with 33 points, 13 rebounds, 11 assists, and 11 steals at Paco Arena in Manila, thus becoming the first player in league history to record such a statistic.

=== Milestones ===
- July 26, 2022:
  - Michael Juico becomes the 5th player to reach 1,000 MPBL career points.
  - Jay Collado becomes the 6th player to reach 1,000 MPBL career points.
- August 2, 2022 - Mark Yee becomes the 1st ever player to reach 1,000 MPBL career rebounds.
  - Mark Yee also becomes the 1st ever player to reach 1,000 MPBL career points and rebounds.
- August 29, 2022 - Byron Villarias becomes the 7th player to reach 1,000 MPBL career points.
- October 7, 2022 - Cedric Ablaza becomes the 8th player to reach 1,000 MPBL career points.
- October 13, 2022 - Jeckster Apinan becomes the 9th player to reach 1,000 MPBL career points.
- October 19, 2022 - Jason Melano becomes the 10th player to reach 1,000 MPBL career points.
- October 28, 2022 - Levi Hernandez becomes the 11th player to reach 1,000 MPBL career points.
- November 18, 2022 - Will McAloney becomes the 12th player to reach 1,000 MPBL career points.
- December 2, 2022 - Michael Mabulac becomes the 13th player to reach 1,000 MPBL career points.

== Statistics ==
=== Individual statistical leaders ===
Category	Player	Team	Statistic
Points per game	Antonio Joson	Marikina Shoemasters	17.7
Rebounds per game	Cedric Ablaza	Batangas City Embassy Chill	11.8
Assists per game	Marcy Arellano	Quezon City MG	9.3
Steals per game	Kyt Jimenez	Sarangani Marlins	2.8
Blocks per game	Jason Ballesteros	Pasig City	2.0
Fouls per game	Arvie Bringas	Bataan Risers	3.3
Minutes per game	Antonio Joson	Marikina Shoemasters	31.0
FG%	Daniel Bayla	Mindoro Tams	52.0%
FT%	Antonio Joson	Marikina Shoemasters	84.0%
3FG%	Jolo Mendoza	Rizal Golden Coolers Xentromall	40.2%

=== Team statistical leaders ===
Category	Team	Statistic
Points per game	Nueva Ecija Rice Vanguards	86.8
Rebounds per game	Batangas City Embassy Chill	50.5
Assists per game	Nueva Ecija Rice Vanguards	26.5
Steals per game	Zamboanga Family's Brand Sardines	10.2
Blocks per game	Sarangani Marlins	4.4
Turnovers per game	Pampanga Giant Lanterns	19.0

== Awards ==
=== Individual season awards ===
Most of the league's individual awards were given out before game 2 of the 2022 national finals at the Nueva Ecija Coliseum in Palayan, Nueva Ecija. The Most Valuable Player was later given out in game 3 at the Mayor Vitaliano D. Agan Coliseum in Zamboanga City while the Finals Most Valuable Player and Coach of the Year were awarded at the conclusion of the series.

This season introduced two new awards, those being the Homegrown Player of the Year and the Rookie of the Year. In addition, the league only honored one All-MPBL Team this season.

Award	Recipient(s)	Team
Most Valuable Player	Jaycee Marcelino	Zamboanga Family's Brand Sardines
Finals Most Valuable Player	Byron Villarias	Nueva Ecija Rice Vanguards
Defensive Player of the Year	Mark Yee	Bacolod Bingo Plus
Rookie of the Year	Kyt Jimenez	Sarangani Marlins
Homegrown Player of the Year	Archie Concepcion	Pampanga Giant Lanterns
Sportsmanship award	Jay-R Taganas	Nueva Ecija Rice Vanguards
All-MPBL First Team	Cedric Ablaza	Batangas City Embassy Chill
All-MPBL First Team	Judel Fuentes	San Juan Knights
All-MPBL First Team	Hesed Gabo	Nueva Ecija Rice Vanguards
All-MPBL First Team	Jaycee Marcelino	Zamboanga Family's Brand Sardines
All-MPBL First Team	Will McAloney	Nueva Ecija Rice Vanguards

=== Players of the Week ===
Week	Player	Ref.
May 2−6, 2022	Jaymar Gimpayan (Valenzuela XUR Homes Realty Inc.)	
May 21–27, 2022	Jayson Apolonio (Pampanga Giant Lanterns)	
May 28 – June 3, 2022	Jhan Nermal (Bacolod Bingo Plus)	
June 4–10, 2022	Jaycee Marcelino (Zamboanga Family's Brand Sardines) (1/2)	
June 11–17, 2022	Cedrick Ablaza (Batangas City Embassy Chill) (1/2)	
June 18–24, 2022	Archie Concepcion (Pampanga Giant Lanterns)	
June 25 – July 1, 2022	Mitchelle Maynes (Pampanga Giant Lanterns)	
July 2–9, 2022	Arvie Bringas (Bataan Risers)	
July 25–30, 2022	Judel Fuentes (San Juan Knights) (1/2)	
August 1–7, 2022	Mark Montuano (Bacoor City Strikers)	
August 8–14, 2022	Paul Sanga (Sarangani Marlins)	
August 15–20, 2022	Cedrick Ablaza (Batangas City Embassy Chill) (2/2)	
August 22–27, 2022	Mark Cruz (GenSan Warriors)	
August 29 – September 3, 2022	Judel Fuentes (San Juan Knights) (2/2)	
September 5–11, 2022	Mark Yee (Bacolod Bingo Plus)	
September 12–17, 2022	Orlan Wamar (San Juan Knights)	
September 19–25, 2022	Jaycee Marcelino (Zamboanga Family's Brand Sardines) (2/2)	
October 3–8, 2022	Dexter Maiquez (San Juan Knights)	

== Media ==
Due to the expiration of ABS-CBN's franchise, the league had to award the television broadcast rights to another network.

Thus, this season marked the first year of the league's ongoing broadcast rights with Cignal TV, as the games were split between the free-to-air One PH and cable channel One Sports+. Cignal Play handled local streaming, while ABS-CBN's iWantTFC still handled international streaming.

The league continued to stream all of its games on Facebook, but this season saw the league expand to YouTube and Kumu for social media streaming.
