= Mandaluyong El Tigre =

- League: MPBL
- Founded: 2018
- Dissolved: 2019
- History: Mandaluyong El Tigre; 2018–2019
- Arena: José Rizal University
- Location: Mandaluyong
- Team colors

The Mandaluyong El Tigre was a Filipino amateur basketball team based in Mandaluyong. The team last competed in the Maharlika Pilipinas Basketball League (MPBL) and played their home games at José Rizal University.

The team was founded for the 2018–19 season. The name was chosen as a nod to Mandaluyong's moniker being the "Tiger City". That season would go on to be the team's only season to date.

== History ==
Mandaluyong joined the MPBL for the 2018–19 season as part of the league's major expansion. The Mandaluyong franchise was noted for acquiring Bobby Ray Parks Jr., who was coming off stints in the NBA Developmental League and ASEAN Basketball League. In their only season, they finished with a record of 8-17, third-worst in the North Division. The team would depart right after, making them the first team to depart from the MPBL. To date, the Mandaluyong franchise are the shortest-lived team in league history.

== Personnel ==
=== Head coaches ===
Mandaluyong El Tigre head coaches
#	Name	Start	End	Achievements	Ref.
1	Mac Cuan	2018–19	2018–19	—	
2	Arlene Rodriguez	2018–19	2018–19	—	

=== Notable players ===
Mandaluyong El Tigre notable players
Player	Position	Tenure	Awards	All-Star
Gian Abrigo		2018–2019	—	1 (2019)

== Season-by-season records ==
League champions
Division champions
Qualified for playoffs
Best regular season record

Season	Regular season					Playoffs	
Season	Division	Finish	W	L	PCT	Stage	Results
Mandaluyong El Tigre
2018–19; Datu Cup	North	11th	8	17	.320	Did not qualify	
Did not participate from 2019–20 to 2026
All-time regular season record			8	17	.320	0 playoff appearances	
All-time playoff record			0	0	–	0 Finals appearances	
All-time overall record			8	17	.320	0 championships	
