= Pasig City MPBL team =

Professional basketball team in Pasig, Philippines

- 2026 Pasig City MPBL team season
- League: MBA (1998–2000); MPBL (2018–2023, 2025–present); FilBasket (2021–2022)
- Founded: 1998; 28 years ago (first incarnation); 2018; 8 years ago (second incarnation)
- History: Pasig Blue Pirates; 1998; Pasig-Rizal Pirates; 1999–2000; Pasig Pirates; 2018–2019; Pasig Sta. Lucia Realtors; 2019–2021; Pasig City; 2022, 2025–present Pasig City MCW Sports; 2022–2023
- Arena: Ynares Sports Arena
- Location: Pasig
- Team colors
- Head coach: Arvin Guinto

The Pasig City MPBL team is a Filipino professional basketball team based in Pasig. The team competes in the Maharlika Pilipinas Basketball League (MPBL) as a member of the league's North Division. The team plays its home games at Ynares Sports Arena.

The team's first incarnation was established in 1998 with the Pasig Blue Pirates of the Metropolitan Basketball Association (MBA), which ran until 2000. The Pirates would later be revived with an MPBL expansion team for the 2018–19 season. Pasig then took a leave of absence in 2024 before returning in 2025.

The Pasig franchise is one of four teams based in the Eastern Manila District of Metro Manila. They also took part in FilBasket and in the Chooks-to-Go Pilipinas 3x3.

== History ==
=== First incarnation (1998–2000) ===
Pasig's basketball franchise was established in 1998 with the Pasig Blue Pirates of the Metropolitan Basketball Association. In 1999, the team was renamed as the Pasig-Rizal Pirates and would remain in the league until 2000.

=== Second incarnation (2018–present) ===
Logo of the Pasig City MCW Sports from late 2022 to 2023.

The Pasig Pirates were revived in 2018, when they became one of sixteen teams that were part of the Maharlika Pilipinas Basketball League's national expansion for its 2018–19 season. The Mark Andaya-led Pirates finished with a league-worst 4–21 record.

In the 2019–20 season, Sta. Lucia Land became the title sponsors of the Pasig franchise, becoming the Pasig Sta. Lucia Realtors, reviving the Realtors moniker used in the Philippine Basketball Association and Pilipinas Commercial Basketball League.

Ahead of the 2022 MPBL playoffs, the team gained the sponsorship of MCW Sports, an online sports news portal in the Philippines.

== Personnel ==
Pasig City MPBL team roster
Players

Pos.	No.	Name	Height	Weight	DOB	From
G	0	Marc Plamenco	6 ft 0 in (1.83 m)			Lyceum
G	1	Warlo James Batac	6 ft 1 in (1.85 m)			Bulacan State
G	2	Loren Brill	6 ft 0 in (1.83 m)		1997–01–14	Old Dominion
F	2	Mark Maloles	5 ft 10 in (1.78 m)			UE
F/C	4	Jonjon Gabriel	6 ft 6 in (1.98 m)		1993–01–06	San Lorenzo
G	8	Ahron Estacio	5 ft 10 in (1.78 m)		1999-09-08	La Consolacion College
G	11	Keith Pido	5 ft 10 in (1.78 m)			UPHSD
G	12	Michael Lambino	5 ft 10 in (1.78 m)			UPHSD
G	13	Jhomel Sansano	5 ft 10 in (1.78 m)			UPHSD
G	15	Esteven Santos	5 ft 10 in (1.78 m)			UPHSD
F	14	Marc Lester Tamayo (HG)	6 ft 2 in (1.88 m)			PCC
G	16	Andrei Romenez	5 ft 11 in (1.80 m)
G/F	17	Jerald Bautista	6 ft 2 in (1.88 m)			STI
G	18	Marc Paul Lopez	5 ft 10 in (1.78 m)			UPHSD
F	26	JR Raflores	6 ft 4 in (1.93 m)		1994–09–17	Mapúa
G	27	Aljien Paul Gadin	6 ft 3 in (1.91 m)			UE
F	29	Jacob Galicia	6 ft 2 in (1.88 m)			PMMS
F	31	Jared Loi Vento	6 ft 4 in (1.93 m)			ICC
F	35	John Felix Corpuz	6 ft 1 in (1.85 m)			ICC
G/F	44	Jerome Garcia (HG)	6 ft 0 in (1.83 m)			Emilio Aguinaldo
G	73	Erwin Van Peña (HG)	5 ft 7 in (1.70 m)			De La Salle Araneta

Coaches

Head coach

- Arvin Guinto

Assistant coach(es)

- Richard Rosales
- Reyner Sadsad

Legend

- (HG) Homegrown
- (FF) Filipino-foreigner
- (EA) EASL player
- (RS) Reserve player
- (S) Suspended
- Injured

- Roster – via Genius Sports
Updated as of: June 21, 2026

=== Head coaches ===
Pasig City MPBL team head coaches
#	Name	Start	End	Achievements	Ref.
1	Joel Banal	1998	2001	—	
2	James Machate	2018	2019	—	
3	Ronjay Enrile	2019	2019	—	
4	Bong Dela Cruz	2019	2022	—	
5	Ogie Gumatay	2022	2023	—	
6	Boyet Fernandez	2023	2023	—	
7	Aldrin Morante	2025	2025	—	
8	Ryan De Ramos	2026	2026	—	
9	Arvin Guinto	2026	current	—	

== Notable players ==
=== PBA players ===
Ex-PBA players

- Josan Nimes

==== Metropolitan Basketball Association ====
- Paul Alvarez
- Bong Ravena
- Jonathan De Guzman
- Jay Magat
- Dorian Peña
- John Dumont

==== Maharlika Pilipinas Basketball League ====
Pasig City MPBL team notable players
Player	Position	Tenure	Awards	All-Star
Mark Andaya		2018–2019	—	1 (2019)
Jeric Teng		2019–2020	1x All-MPBL First Team (2020)	1 (2020)
Carlo Lastimosa		2022	—	1 (2022)
Jason Ballesteros		2022–2023	1x Defensive Player of the Year (2023)	1 (2023)
Ryan Costelo		2022–2023	1x All-MPBL Second Team (2023)	1 (2023)

== Season-by-season records ==
League champions
Division champions
Qualified for playoffs
Best regular season record

=== Maharlika Pilipinas Basketball League ===
Season	Regular season							Playoffs	
Season	Division	Finish	GP	W	L	PCT	GB	Stage	Results
Pasig Pirates
2018–19; Datu Cup	North	13th	25	4	21	.160	19	Did not qualify	
Pasig Sta. Lucia Realtors
2019–20; Lakan Season	North	7th	30	18	12	.600	8	First Round	lost vs. Manila, 0–2
Pasig City MCW Sports
2022	North	2nd	21	14	7	.667	7	Division quarterfinals Division semifinals	won vs. Quezon City, 2–0 lost vs. San Juan, 0–2
2023	North	5th	28	19	9	.679	7	Division quarterfinals	lost vs. Caloocan, 1–2
Did not participate in 2024
Pasig City MPBL team
2025	North	10th	29	12	17	.414	16	Clinched play-in; did not qualify playoffs	
2026	North	8th	25	11	14	.440	12	Clinched play-in; To be determined	
All-time regular season record			158	78	80	.494		3 playoff appearances	
All-time playoff record			9	3	6	.333		0 finals appearances	
All-time overall record			167	81	86	.485		0 championships	
