= Timeline of the Maharlika Pilipinas Basketball League =

The following is a timeline of the Maharlika Pilipinas Basketball League (MPBL) and its member teams. Founded in 2017 and later beginning play in 2018, the league currently features 30 member teams as of 2025.

== Pre-MPBL history (1998–2011) ==
Some teams predate the MPBL's establishment in 2017, particularly with the former incarnations of those teams. These include:

- Pasig City: Founded in 1998 as the Pasig Blue Pirates of the Metropolitan Basketball Association (MBA).
- Sarangani Gripper Motorcycle Tire: Founded in 1998 as the SocSarGen Marlins of the MBA.
- San Juan Knights: Founded in 1999 as a member of the MBA.
- Quezon Huskers: Founded in 2004 as the Quezon Coco Huskers of the United Regional Basketball League (URBL).
- GenSan Warriors: Founded in 2005 as a member of the Mindanao Visayas Basketball Association (MVBA).
- Zamboanga Sikat: Should one also consider the Zamboanga Valientes, whose MPBL side split from the team in 2019, the team's lineage can be dated back to 2006 as members of the MVBA and National Basketball Conference (NBC).

== Amateur era (2018–2020) ==
=== 2018 season: First season ===
The league was established in 2017 and began its inaugural season in January 2018. This season featured ten teams, all of which are based in Luzon.

2018 MPBL teams
Bataan Defenders	Muntinlupa Cagers
Batangas City Athletics	Navotas Clutch
Bulacan Kuyas	Parañaque Patriots
Caloocan Supremos	Quezon City Capitals
Imus Bandera	Valenzuela Classic

=== 2018–19 season: National expansion ===
This season featured 26 teams, with all ten charter teams returning while the league added sixteen expansion teams. With the league marking its national expansion, the teams were split into two geographical divisions: the North and South Divisions. Mid-season, the MPBL side of the Zamboanga Valientes split to become the Zamboanga Family's Brand Sardines.

2018–19 name changes
2018 team name	2018–19 team name(s)
Bataan Defenders	Bataan Risers
Makati Skyscrapers*	Makati Super Crunch
Valenzuela Classic	Valenzuela Idol Cheesedogs Valenzuela Classic (reverted)
(*) Expansion team

Joined this season	Joined and departed this season, last active season

2018–19 MPBL teams
North		South	
Bataan Risers	Pampanga Lanterns	Bacoor City Strikers	Laguna Heroes
Bulacan Kuyas	Pasay Voyagers	Basilan Steel	Marikina Shoemasters
Caloocan Supremos	Pasig Pirates	Batangas City Athletics	Muntinlupa Cagers
Makati Super Crunch	Quezon City Capitals	Cebu City Sharks	Parañaque Patriots
Mandaluyong El Tigre	San Juan Knights	Davao Occidental Tigers	Rizal Crusaders
Manila Stars	Valenzuela Classic	GenSan Warriors	Zamboanga Family's Brand Sardines
Navotas Clutch		Imus Bandera	

=== 2019–20 season ===
This season featured 31 teams, which is the biggest the league has ever gotten. Six expansion teams were admitted into the league: Bacolod Master Sardines, Bicol Volcanoes, Iloilo United Royals, Mindoro Tamaraws, Nueva Ecija MiGuard, and Soccsksargen Marlins. One team, the Mandaluyong El Tigre became the first team to depart from the league. The league also did its first realignment with the Marikina Shoemasters, Parañaque Patriots, and Rizal Golden Coolers moving to the North Division.

2019–20 name changes
2018–19 team name	2019–20 team name(s)
Cebu City Sharks	Cebu Sharks Cebu Casino Ethyl Alcohol
Imus Bandera	Imus Khaleb Shawarma Imus Bandera (reverted)
Laguna Heroes	Biñan City Heroes Biñan City Luxxe White
Navotas Clutch	Navotas Uni-Pak Sardines
Nueva Ecija MiGuard*	Nueva Ecija ForestLake Nueva Ecija Rice Vanguards
Pampanga Lanterns	Pampanga Giant Lanterns
Pasig Pirates	Pasig Sta. Lucia Realtors
Rizal Crusaders	Rizal Golden Coolers
Soccsksargen Marlins*	Sarangani Marlins
Valenzuela Classic	Valenzuela SPV TOP Marketplace Val City Carga Backload Solution
(*) Expansion team

Joined this season	Joined and departed this season	Departed after this season	Last active season

2019–20 MPBL teams
North		South	
Bataan Risers	Pampanga Giant Lanterns	Bacolod Master Sardines	GenSan Warriors
Bulacan Kuyas	Parañaque Patriots	Bacoor City Strikers	Iloilo United Royals
Caloocan Supremos	Pasay Voyagers	Basilan Steel	Imus Bandera
Makati Super Crunch	Pasig Sta. Lucia Realtors	Batangas City Athletics	Mindoro Tamaraws
Manila Stars	Quezon City Capitals	Bicol Volcanoes	Muntinlupa Cagers
Marikina Shoemasters	Rizal Golden Coolers	Biñan City Luxxe White	Sarangani Marlins
Navotas Uni-Pak Sardines	San Juan Knights	Cebu Casino Ethyl Alcohol	Zamboanga Family's Brand Sardines
Nueva Ecija Rice Vanguards	Val City Carga Backload Solution	Davao Occidental Tigers	

== Professional era (2022–present) ==
=== 2022 season ===
This season featured 22 teams after nine teams from the previous season all departed from the league, marking the first time the league contracted in size. This season would have seen the full-time debut of the Negros Muscovados, but was postponed to the following season. The Rizal Golden Coolers were realigned back to the South Division.

2022 name changes
2019–20 team name	2022 team name(s)
Bacolod Master Sardines	Bacolod Bingo Plus
Batangas City Athletics	Batangas City Embassy Chill
Biñan City Luxxe White	Laguna Heroes
Caloocan Supremos	Caloocan Excellence
Imus Bandera	Imus City Bandera
Makati Super Crunch	Makati × MNL Kingpin
Mindoro Tamaraws	Mindoro Tams
Pasig Sta. Lucia Realtors	Pasig City Pasig City MCW Sports
Quezon City Capitals	Quezon City MG
Val City Carga Backload Solution	Valenzuela MJAS Zenith Valenzuela XUR Homes Realty Inc.

2022 MPBL teams
North		South	
Bataan Risers	Pampanga Giant Lanterns	Bacolod Bingo Plus	Mindoro Tams
Caloocan Excellence	Pasig City MCW Sports	Bacoor City Strikers	Muntinlupa Cagers
Makati × MNL Kingpin	Quezon City MG	Batangas City Embassy Chill	Rizal Golden Coolers
Manila Stars	San Juan Knights	GenSan Warriors	Sarangani Marlins
Marikina Shoemasters	Valenzuela XUR Homes Realty Inc.	Imus City Bandera	Zamboanga Family's Brand Sardines
Nueva Ecija Rice Vanguards		Laguna Heroes	

=== 2023 season ===
This season featured 29 teams. Two expansion teams joined the league: the Negros Muscovados and the Quezon Huskers. Five teams also made their return: the Bulacan Kuyas, Bicol Volcanoes, Iloilo United Royals, Parañaque Patriots, and Pasay Voyagers. The Rizal Golden Coolers were realigned for the third straight season, moving back to the North Division.

2023 name changes
2022 team name	2023 team name(s)
Bacolod Bingo Plus	Bacolod City of Smiles
Caloocan Excellence	Caloocan Batang Kankaloo
Imus City Bandera	Imus SV Squad
Laguna Heroes	Laguna Krah Asia
Makati × MNL Kingpin	Makati OKBet Kings
Mindoro Tams	Oriental Mindoro Disiplinados Mindoro Disiplinados
Quezon City MG	Quezon City Gaz N Go Quezon City Toda Aksyon

Joined this season	Returned this season	Departed after this season	Last active season

2023 MPBL teams
North		South	
Bataan Risers	Parañaque Patriots	Bacolod City of Smiles	Laguna Krah Asia
Bulacan Kuyas	Pasay Voyagers	Bacoor City Strikers	Mindoro Disiplinados
Caloocan Batang Kankaloo	Pasig City MCW Sports	Batangas City Embassy Chill	Muntinlupa Cagers
Makati OKBet Kings	Quezon City Toda Aksyon	Bicol Volcanoes	Negros Muscovados
Manila Stars	Rizal Golden Coolers	GenSan Warriors	Quezon Huskers
Marikina Shoemasters	San Juan Knights	Iloilo United Royals	Sarangani Marlins
Nueva Ecija Rice Vanguards	Valenzuela XUR Homes Realty Inc.	Imus SV Squad	Zamboanga Family's Brand Sardines
Pampanga Giant Lanterns			

=== 2024 season: Northern Luzon expansion ===
This season featured 29 teams and marked the league's expansion to Northern Luzon with two expansion teams: the Abra Weavers and the Pangasinan Heatwaves. A third expansion team, the Tarlac United Force, withdrew due to financial concerns. The Davao Occidental Tigers made their return after being absent the past two seasons while three teams departed from the league: the Bacoor City Strikers, Makati OKBet Kings, and Pasig City MCW Sports. The Parañaque Patriots were realigned back to the South Division.

2023 team name	2024 team name(s)
Batangas City Embassy Chill	Batangas City Athletics (Invitational only) Batangas City Tanduay Rum Masters
Bicol Volcanoes	Bicolandia Oragons
GenSan Warriors	South Cotabato Warriors
Imus SV Squad	Imus Agimat
Laguna Krah Asia	Biñan Tatak Gel
Manila Stars	Manila SV Batang Sampaloc
Mindoro Disiplinados	Mindoro Tamaraws
Valenzuela XUR Homes Realty Inc.	Valenzuela Classic
Zamboanga Family's Brand Sardines	Zamboanga Master Sardines

Joined this season	Returned this season	Last active season	Withdrew mid-season

2024 MPBL teams
North		South	
Abra Weavers	Pangasinan Heatwaves	Bacolod City of Smiles	Muntinlupa Cagers
Bataan Risers	Pasay Voyagers	Batangas City Tanduay Rum Masters	Negros Muscovados
Bulacan Kuyas	Quezon City Toda Aksyon	Bicolandia Oragons	Parañaque Patriots
Caloocan Batang Kankaloo	Rizal Golden Coolers	Biñan Tatak Gel	Quezon Huskers
Manila SV Batang Sampaloc	San Juan Knights	Davao Occidental Tigers	Sarangani Marlins
Marikina Shoemasters	~~Tarlac United Force~~	Iloilo United Royals	South Cotabato Warriors
Nueva Ecija Rice Vanguards	Valenzuela Classic	Imus Agimat	Zamboanga Master Sardines
Pampanga Giant Lanterns		Mindoro Tamaraws	

=== 2025 season ===
The Ilagan Isabela Cowboys joined the league as an expansion team. Basilan's team returned as the Basilan Viva Portmasters as well as Cebu's team with the Cebu Classic, both coming off three-season absences. The Pasig City MPBL team also returned after taking a leave of absence last season. Three other teams left: the Bicolandia Oragons, Iloilo United Royals, and Negros Muscovados. The Rizal Golden Coolers were realigned back again to the South Division.

Previous team name	New team name
Abra Weavers	Abra Solid North Weavers
Bacolod City of Smiles	Bacolod Tubo Slashers
Basilan Steel (2019–20)	Basilan Starhorse; Basilan Viva Portmasters
Cebu Casino Ethyl Alcohol (2019–20)	Cebu Classic; Cebu Greats
Imus Agimat	Imus Braderhood
Manila SV Batang Sampaloc	Manila Batang Quiapo
Marikina Shoemasters	Marikina Verdiamonds Jewellers; Marikina Shoemasters (reverted)
Pasig City MCW Sports (2023)	Pasig City
Quezon City Toda Aksyon	Quezon City Galeries Taipan
Sarangani Marlins	Sarangani Gripper Motorcycle Tire
South Cotabato Warriors	GenSan Warriors
Valenzuela Classic	Val City Magic
Zamboanga Master Sardines	Zamboanga Sikat

Joined this season	Returned this season

2025 MPBL teams
North		South	
Abra Solid North Weavers	Pampanga Giant Lanterns	Bacolod Tubo Slashers	Mindoro Tamaraws
Bataan Risers	Pangasinan Heatwaves	Basilan Viva Portmasters	Muntinlupa Cagers
Bulacan Kuyas	Pasay Voyagers	Batangas City Tanduay Rum Masters	Parañaque Patriots
Caloocan Batang Kankaloo	Pasig City	Biñan Tatak Gel	Quezon Huskers
Ilagan Isabela Cowboys	Quezon City Galeries Taipan	Cebu Classic	Rizal Golden Coolers
Manila Batang Quiapo	San Juan Knights	Davao Occidental Tigers	Sarangani Gripper Motorcycle Tire
Marikina Shoemasters	Val City Magic	GenSan Warriors	Zamboanga Sikat
Nueva Ecija Rice Vanguards		Imus Braderhood	
