= Philip Manalang =

Filipino basketball player

No. 18 – Rizal Golden Coolers
- Position: Point guard
- League: MPBL

Personal information
- Born: March 1, 1997 (age 29)

Career information
- High school: NU (Manila)
- College: UE
- PBA draft: 2020: 5th round, 50th overall pick
- Drafted by: Rain or Shine Elasto Painters
- Playing career: 2019–present

Career history
- 2019–2021: Basilan Steel/Peace Riders/Jumbo Plastic
- 2022–2023: Nueva Ecija Capitals/Rice Vanguards
- 2024: Parañaque Patriots
- 2025: Ilagan Isabela Cowboys
- 2026–present: Rizal Golden Coolers

Career highlights
- MPBL champion (2022); VisMin champion (2021 – 1st); 2× FilBasket champion (Subic 2021, Summer 2022)

Philip Manalang (born March 1, 1997) is a Filipino professional basketball player for the Rizal Golden Coolers of the Maharlika Pilipinas Basketball League (MPBL).

Manalang played for the National University (NU) Bullpups in high school, before moving to the University of the East afterwards. He played for the UE Red Warriors in his college years.

Manalang entered regional basketball in 2019 as he joined the Basilan Steel of the Maharlika Pilipinas Basketball League. He then moved to the Nueva Ecija Rice Vanguards in 2022 for two seasons before moving to the Parañaque Patriots in 2024 and the Ilagan Isabela Cowboys in 2025.

== Career ==
=== High school and college career ===
In high school, Manalang played for the NU Bullpups. He last played for the Bullpups during UAAP Season 77 in 2015, after which he was released by NU. He then moved to the UE Red Warriors, where he would go on to play until UAAP Season 82 in 2019.

=== Basilan Steel ===
After his Manalang's college career ended, he joined the regional Basilan Steel of the Maharlika Pilipinas Basketball League.

On March 14, 2021, during the PBA season 46 draft, Manalang was selected by the Rain or Shine Elasto Painters in the fifth round with the 50th pick. He didn't get an offer from the team and thus became an unrestricted free agent. As the now-Basilan Peace Riders moved to the Pilipinas VisMin Super Cup, so did Manalang, marking his first professional stint. He then won his first league championship after Basilan won the 2021 VisMin 1st Conference. Manalang then became part of the AICC Manila team that won FilBasket's Subic Championship, itself composed of Basilan Peace Riders players.

Basilan was then invited to compete in the 2021 MPBL Invitational and made the finals against the Nueva Ecija Rice Vanguards. The game went into overtime and was tied while approaching its end. Manalang didn't score once until the final possession with 1.9 seconds remaining. He received the ball from Michael Juico and attempted a three-point shot. He made the shot and by 83–80, Basilan won the tournament. Manalang was awarded the Finals MVP nod.

=== Nueva Ecija Rice Vanguards (2022–2023) ===
In 2022, he moved to the Nueva Ecija Rice Vanguards franchise. He first played for the team in the 2022 FilBasket Summer Championship. He later played in the 2022 MPBL season, becoming part of the 2022 Nueva Ecija Rice Vanguards season. In 2022, he won two championships with Nueva Ecija.

=== Parañaque Patriots (2024) ===
After two years with the Nueva Ecija franchise, he moved to the Parañaque Patriots for the 2024 MPBL season.

=== Ilagan Isabela Cowboys (2025) ===
After one year in Parañaque he moved to the Expansion team Ilagan Isabela Cowboys for the following 2025 MPBL season.

=== Rizal Golden Coolers(2026–present) ===
After one year in Ilagan, Isabela he moved to the Rizal Golden Coolers for the following 2026 MPBL season.

== Career statistics ==
=== MPBL ===
Legend
GP	Games played	GS	Games started	MPG	Minutes per game
FG%	Field-goal percentage	3P%	3-point field-goal percentage	FT%	Free-throw percentage
RPG	Rebounds per game	APG	Assists per game	SPG	Steals per game
BPG	Blocks per game	PPG	Points per game	**Bold**	Career high

==== Season-by-season averages ====
Year	Team	GP	GS	MPG	FG%	3P%	FT%	RPG	APG	SPG	BPG	PPG
2019–20	Basilan	18	4	13.9	.247	.103	**.632**	1.6	2.6	.5	.0	2.8
2022	Nueva Ecija	32	7	13.3	**.306**	.152	.429	2.2	2.6	.7	.0	2.4
2023	Nueva Ecija	23	10	11.7	.193	.188	.467	1.9	2.6	.5	.0	1.5
2024	Parañaque	**33**	**26**	**25.9**	.295	**.191**	.528	**3.5**	**6.2**	**1.1**	.0	**5.3**
