= Jeff Manday =

Filipino basketball player

No. 30 – Caloocan Batang Kankaloo
- Position: Point guard
- League: MPBL

Personal information
- Born: March 29, 1995 (age 31)
- Listed height: 6 ft 0 in (1.83 m)
- Listed weight: 177 lb (80 kg)

Career information
- College: Santa Ana de Victorias
- PBA draft: 2020: 6th round, 58th overall pick
- Drafted by: San Miguel Beermen
- Playing career: 2021–present

Career history
- 2021–2022: San Miguel Beermen 3x3
- 2022–2024: Meralco Bolts 3x3
- 2024–present: Caloocan Supremos/Batang Kankaloo

Career highlights
- MPBL All-Star (2025); PSL champion (2025)

Jeffrey Lim Manday (born March 29, 1995) is a Filipino professional basketball player for the Caloocan Batang Kankaloo of the Maharlika Pilipinas Basketball League (MPBL).

== Early life and education ==
Hailing from Bacolod, Manday grew up in poverty and was unable to attend out-of-town PBA games held in his home province. He was originally a marathoner before transitioning to basketball in his third year in high school.

He graduated with a degree in office administration at the Colegio de Santa Ana de Victorias in 2019.

== Collegiate career ==
Manday was invited by Colegio de San Agustin in Bacolod. While playing for San Agustin at the NOPSSCEA, Manday was scouted by Colegio de Santa Ana de Victorias. He accepted the school's offers out of financial incentives with Manday requesting his brother be also accepted to the team. With the CSAV Titans, Manday helped the team win three NOPSSCEA titles from 2017 to 2019.

== Professional career ==
=== Marinerong Pilipino (2020) ===
Manday played two games for the Marinerong Pilipino Skippers in the 2020 PBA D-League Aspirants' Cup which was cancelled by the COVID-19 pandemic.

=== San Miguel Beermen 3x3 (2021–present) ===
Manday was selected in the sixth round of the 2020 PBA draft with the 58th overall pick by the San Miguel Beermen but was not signed. In July 2021, he signed with the Beermen's 3x3 team.
