= Eric Camson =

Filipino basketball player

No. 13 – Caloocan Batang Kankaloo
- Position: Power forward
- League: MPBL

Personal information
- Born: June 12, 1990 (age 36) Lemery, Batangas, Philippines
- Listed height: 6 ft 4 in (1.93 m)
- Listed weight: 228 lb (103 kg)

Career information
- College: Adamson
- PBA draft: 2013: 2nd round, 16th overall pick
- Drafted by: Air21 Express
- Playing career: 2013–present

Career history
- 2013–2014: Air21 Express
- 2014–2017: NLEX Road Warriors
- 2017–2024: Terrafirma Dyip
- 2025: Rizal Golden Coolers
- 2026–present: Caloocan Batang Kankaloo

Career highlights
- All-MPBL Second Team (2025); MPBL All-Star (2025)

Eric James Mandanas Camson (born June 12, 1990) is a Filipino professional basketball player for the Caloocan Batang Kankaloo of the Maharlika Pilipinas Basketball League (MPBL). He was drafted 16th overall in the 2013 PBA draft by the Air21 Express.

== College career ==
Camson played for the Adamson Soaring Falcons while he was in college. He significantly improved in his final two years of college, averaging 40% shooting from three and was among the top five rebounders in the UAAP. In his senior year, he led the Falcons in scoring and rebounding with averages of 14.5 points and 9.1 rebounds a game.

== Professional career ==
=== Air 21 Express/NLEX Road Warriors ===
Camson was drafted 16th overall in the 2013 PBA draft by the Air21 Express. In his rookie year, he had eight points and ten rebounds in a loss to Barangay Ginebra San Miguel. He then made the lineup for the Rookie vs Sophomores game in his sophomore year. He didn't get much playing time in his first three years in the league but that changed with the arrival of coach Yeng Guiao and a MCL injury to big man Enrico Villanueva. He scored 14 points in a loss to the Rain or Shine Elasto Painters.

=== Mahindra Floodbuster/Terrafirma franchise ===
During the 2017 Commissioner's Cup, Camson was traded to the Mahindra Floodbuster along with Glenn Khobuntin and a 2020 second-round pick in exchange for Alex Mallari and Kenneth Ighalo. In his first game for Mahindra, he had nine points, three rebounds, and two assists in 18 minutes in a win over the Blackwater Elite. During the 2017 Governors' Cup, he was fined P5,000 for committing a flagrant foul in their games versus the TNT Katropa.

In the 2017–18 Philippine Cup, Camson had a career-high 24 points in a loss to his former team. He got into an elbow match against Raymond Almazan of Rain or Shine, and was ejected from the game. He was then fined P30K and suspended for one game.

The Dyip fell short of making the playoffs thrice the following season. Camson was re-signed at the end of their season.

In the 2021 Philippine Cup, Camson had 15 points (including the game-sealing score) and 13 rebounds to help Terrafirma score an upset win over Ginebra.

On August 5, 2024, Camson was released by Terrafirma.

== PBA career statistics ==
Legend
GP	Games played	MPG	Minutes per game
FG%	Field-goal percentage	3P%	3-point field-goal percentage	FT%	Free-throw percentage
RPG	Rebounds per game	APG	Assists per game	SPG	Steals per game
BPG	Blocks per game	PPG	Points per game	**Bold**	Career high

As of the end of 2023–24 season

=== Season-by-season averages ===
Year	Team	GP	MPG	FG%	3P%	FT%	RPG	APG	SPG	BPG	PPG
2013–14	Air21	**35**	10.9	.434	.000	.545	3.5	.2	.3	.1	3.5
2014–15	NLEX	19	5.9	.303	.000	.571	1.7	.3	.4	.1	1.3
2015–16	NLEX	9	6.9	**.571**	.000	.667	1.6	.3	.2	.2	3.1
2016–17	NLEX	31	12.8	.365	.299	.714	3.1	.5	.4	.2	6.0
2016–17	Mahindra / Kia	31	12.8	.365	.299	.714	3.1	.5	.4	.2	6.0
2017–18	Kia / Columbian	25	18.4	.397	.262	.667	4.8	1.0	**.8**	.1	9.9
2019	Columbian	29	12.6	.347	.250	**.808**	3.0	.6	.4	.2	6.0
2020	Terrafirma	10	18.6	.457	.313	.769	3.2	**1.3**	.5	—	8.4
2021	Terrafirma	20	14.7	.385	.150	.727	3.8	.8	.3	**.3**	5.1
2022–23	Terrafirma	33	**20.3**	.444	**.333**	.701	**5.3**	.9	.5	.1	**10.0**
2023–24	Terrafirma	23	7.2	.442	.294	.727	1.6	.5	.1	.1	3.9
Career		234	13.2	.404	.267	.705	3.4	.6	.4	.1	5.9
