= 2025 MPBL season =

7th season of the Maharlika Pilipinas Basketball League

- League: Maharlika Pilipinas Basketball League
- Sport: Basketball
- Duration: Regular season: March 8 – September 30, 2025; Play-In Tournament: October 2 – 8, 2025; Playoffs: October 10 – December 6, 2025; Finals: December 11 – 16, 2025
- Games: 435 (regular season, total); 29 (regular season, per team)
- Teams: 30
- TV partner: Solar Sports
- Streaming partner(s): Facebook; YouTube

Regular season
- Top seed: Abra Solid North Weavers
- Season MVP: Dave Ildefonso (Abra)

Playoffs
- North Division champions: Abra Solid North Weavers
- North Division runners-up: Pangasinan Heatwaves
- South Division champions: Quezon Huskers
- South Division runners-up: Biñan Tatak Gel

Finals
- Champions: Abra Solid North Weavers
- Runners-up: Quezon Huskers
- Finals MVP: Jason Brickman (Abra)

MPBL seasons
- ← 2024 2026 →

The 2025 MPBL season was the seventh season of the Maharlika Pilipinas Basketball League (MPBL) and its fourth under professional status. The regular season began on March 8, 2025 with the opening ceremony at the Capital Arena in Ilagan, Isabela. The season ended on December 16, 2025 with the 2025 MPBL finals between Abra Solid North Weavers and Quezon Huskers.

This season features 30 teams. The league expanded to the Cagayan Valley region for the first time with the addition of the Ilagan Isabela Cowboys. Three teams (Basilan Viva Portmasters, Cebu Classic, and Pasig City) made their comebacks. This season will also see the introduction of the league's play-in tournament to be held in between the regular season and playoffs.

The Pampanga Giant Lanterns are two-time defending champions and reigning North Division champions, while the Quezon Huskers are the reigning South Division champions.

This season also marked the first of what would have been a new two-year title sponsorship deal with gambling company 1xBet. However, the sponsorship was dropped midway through the season.

== Format changes ==
=== Postseason changes ===
On February 2, 2025, the league announced a couple of changes to its playoff format, the biggest being the addition of a play-in tournament similar to the NBA's play-in round, which will be contested by teams ranked seventh through tenth in their respective divisions. The seventh and eighth-ranked teams will play for the seventh seed in the playoffs. The losing team will face the winner of the game between the ninth and tenth-ranked teams for the eighth seed and the final playoff spot. Due to this change, only the top six teams will directly advance to the playoffs.

In addition, the division finals is made a best-of-five series from the best-of-three series in previous seasons. These changes mark the first since the league expanded the playoffs to a 16-team pool due to the league's national expansion in 2019.

=== Preseason Invitational cancellation ===
On January 22, the league announced that it will not host a Preseason Invitational tournament this season, so that the competing teams can focus on building their rosters. This will mark the first time in the professional era that the league will not host such a tournament.

== Teams ==
Teams were given until February 1 to submit their intent to compete, although some were given extensions. This season, 30 teams will compete, one more than the 29 teams of the previous two seasons. This makes it the second-biggest team pool in league history, only behind the 2019–20 season, which had 31 teams compete.

=== Expansions, returnees, and contractions ===
On January 16, commissioner Kenneth Duremdes announced that an expansion team based in Ilagan, Isabela will join the regional league this season. The team, later named the Ilagan Isabela Cowboys, was formally established on February 1, marking the first time the league has a team based in the Cagayan Valley region and will continue the expansion into Northern Luzon, following additions of the Pangasinan Heatwaves and the Abra Weavers in the last season.

Three teams also made their return. After being absent in the last three seasons, the Basilan's MPBL team returned as the Basilan Viva Portmasters (initially the Basilan Starhorse), having competed in the 2019–20 season as the Basilan Steel, and as a guest team in the 2021 Preseason Invitational as the Basilan Jumbo Plastic. Similarly, Cebu's MPBL team will also return for the first time since 2020, now known as the Cebu Classic. The Pasig City MPBL team is the last team to make its return, after not competing in the previous season.

On the other hand, three teams made their departures. The Bicolandia Oragons and Iloilo United Royals left the league after competing in three of the last four seasons while the Negros Muscovados depart after two seasons. This means that Bicol Region and Western Visayas won't have any representatives for their respective regions.

=== Realignment ===
The Ilagan Isabela Cowboys were placed in the North Division alongside Pasig City while the Basilan Viva Portmasters and Cebu Classic were placed in the South Division. To balance both divisions, the Rizal Golden Coolers were realigned back to the South, its fourth realignment in history and first since 2023.

=== Team name changes ===
Previous team name	New team name
Abra Weavers	Abra Solid North Weavers
Bacolod City of Smiles	Bacolod Tubo Slashers
Basilan Steel (2019–20)	Basilan Starhorse; Basilan Viva Portmasters
Cebu Casino Ethyl Alcohol (2019–20)	Cebu Classic; Cebu Greats
Imus Agimat	Imus Braderhood
Manila SV Batang Sampaloc	Manila Batang Quiapo
Marikina Shoemasters	Marikina Verdiamonds Jewellers; Marikina Shoemasters (reverted)
Pasig City MCW Sports (2023)	Pasig City
Quezon City Toda Aksyon	Quezon City Galeries Taipan
Sarangani Marlins	Sarangani Gripper Motorcycle Tire
South Cotabato Warriors	GenSan Warriors
Valenzuela Classic	Val City Magic
Zamboanga Master Sardines	Zamboanga Sikat

== Transactions ==
=== Player transactions ===
Rookie signings

- The Abra Solid North Weavers signed CJ Austria and Joshua David (De La Salle), and Jack Cruz-Dumont (UE).

Free agent signings

- The Abra Solid North Weavers signed two-time all-star and former All-MPBL Team selection Leo Najorda. He last played for the Koponang Lakan ng Bulacan of the Pilipinas Super League (PSL) in 2023.
- The Pangasinan Heatwaves signed 2018 PBA Mr. Quality Minutes Vic Manuel. He last played for the Terrafirma Dyip of the Philippine Basketball Association (PBA) in 2025.
- The Sarangani Marlins signed two-time all-star and 2022 Rookie of the Year Kyt Jimenez. He last played for the San Miguel Beermen of the PBA in 2024. Notably, Jimenez also recorded the elusive quadruple-double while playing for Sarangani in 2022.

Transfers

- The Abra Solid North Weavers signed all-star Encho Serrano from the Pampanga Giant Lanterns.
- The Basilan Starhorse signed two-time All-Star Game MVP Jeff Viernes (from Pampanga) alongside fellow all-stars Rabeh Al-Hussaini (from Manila) and Emman Calo (from Nueva Ecija). Basilan also signed PBA great Arwind Santos from the Pampanga Giant Lanterns.
- The Cebu Classic signed two-time all-star Paulo Hubalde from the Valenzuela Classic.
- The Nueva Ecija Rice Vanguards signed the Marcelino twins, Jaycee and Jayvee, from the Zamboanga Master Sardines. The former won Most Valuable Player in 2022 and was selected to three All-MPBL First Teams while with Zamboanga.

Departures

- Two-time season MVP and two-time finals MVP Justine Baltazar departed the league after two seasons, both with the Pampanga Giant Lanterns, to sign with the Converge FiberXers of the PBA.

=== Coaching changes ===
Off-season changes
Team	Departing coach	Incoming coach
Bacolod Tubo Slashers	RJ Argamino	Paolo Javelona
Basilan Starhorse	—N/a	Mac Tan
Bulacan Kuyas	Jonathan Reyes	Elgin Espina
Caloocan Batang Kankaloo	Alexander Angeles	Gabby Espinas
Cebu Greats	—N/a	Voltaire Ora
Davao Occidental Tigers	Manu Iñigo	Arvin Bonleon
Ilagan Isabela Cowboys	—N/a	Louie Gonzalez
Imus Braderhood	Eric Sy	Britt Reroma
Manila Batang Quiapo	Ariel Vanguardia	Max Dayandante
Marikina Shoemasters	Rysal Castro	Eric Sy
Mindoro Tamaraws	JR Cawaling	Rodney Santos
Muntinlupa Cagers	Mixson Ramos	Giovanni Ludovice
Pasig City	—N/a	Aldrin Morante
Quezon City Galeries Taipan	Egay Macaraya	Jeff Perlas
San Juan Knights	Randy Alcantara	Alexander Angeles
Val City Magic	Eric Martinez	Raymond Valenzona
Zamboanga Sikat	Louie Alas	Bong Ramos

Mid-season changes
Team	Departing coach	Incoming coach
Basilan Starhorse	Mac Tan	Rich Alvarez
Bulacan Kuyas	Elgin Espina	Terence Reyes
Caloocan Batang Kankaloo	Gabby Espinas	Myk Saguiguit
Cebu Greats	Voltaire Ora	Junthy Valenzuela
Davao Occidental Tigers	Arvin Bonleon; Clive Castillo	Clive Castillo; Arvin Bonleon
Marikina Shoemasters	Eric Sy	Angelo Nebres
Mindoro Tamaraws	Rodney Santos	Bengie Teodoro
Parañaque Patriots	Myk Saguiguit; Stephen Mopera	Stephen Mopera; Melquiades Villanueva
Sarangani Gripper Motorcycle Tire	John Kallos	Ronnie Dojillo

== Arenas ==
=== Arena changes ===
- The Capital Arena in Ilagan, Isabela became the primary home venue of the expansion Ilagan Isabela Cowboys.
- The Ynares Center in Rodriguez, Rizal became the new permanent home venue of the Rizal Golden Coolers. The team played at the Ynares Center for the past five seasons in Antipolo, since the 2018–19 season.
- The Rizal Memorial Coliseum in Malate, Manila became a new alternate venue for the Manila Batang Quiapo.
- The Robert B. Estrella Sr. Memorial Stadium in Rosales, Pangasinan became a new alternate venue for the Pangasinan Heatwaves.
- The Marikina Sports Center returned as the primary home venue of the Marikina Shoemasters. It was last used in the 2023 season.
- The Filoil EcoOil Center in San Juan, home of the San Juan Knights, was renamed to the Playtime Filoil Centre in May 2025.
- The Quezon City District 2 Gymnasium in Quezon City became a new alternate venue for the Quezon City Galeries Taipan.
- The Batangas Province Events Center in Batangas City, Batangas became a new alternate venue for the Batangas City Tanduay Rum Masters.

=== Regular arenas ===
New venues for this season are indicated with bold text.

Abra Solid North Weavers	Bataan Risers		Batangas City Tanduay Rum Masters	
University of Abra (Gov. Andres B. Bernos Memorial Gymnasium); Bangued, Abra	Bataan People's Center; Balanga, Bataan	Orion Sports Complex; Orion, Bataan	Batangas City Coliseum; Batangas City, Batangas	Batangas Province Events Center; Batangas City, Batangas
Capacity: 2,000	Capacity: 4,000	Capacity: 2,000	Capacity: 4,000	Capacity: 6,000

Batangas City Tanduay Rum Masters	Biñan Tatak Gel	Caloocan Batang Kankaloo	Ilagan Isabela Cowboys	Manila Batang Quiapo
FPJ Arena; San Jose, Batangas	Alonte Sports Arena; Biñan, Laguna	Caloocan Sports Complex; Caloocan	Capital Arena; Ilagan, Isabela	Paco Arena; Manila
Capacity: 3,000	Capacity: 6,500	Capacity: 3,000	Capacity: 10,000	Capacity: 1,000

Manila Batang Quiapo		Marikina Shoemasters	Mindoro Tamaraws	Nueva Ecija Rice Vanguards
Rizal Memorial Coliseum; Manila	San Andres Sports Complex; Manila	Marikina Sports Center; Marikina	Pola Gymnasium; Pola, Oriental Mindoro	Nueva Ecija Coliseum; Palayan, Nueva Ecija
Capacity: 6,100	Capacity: 3,000	Capacity: 7,000	Capacity: N/A	Capacity: 3,000

Pampanga Giant Lanterns	Pangasinan Heatwaves		Parañaque Patriots	Pasay Voyagers
Bren Z. Guiao Convention Center; San Fernando, Pampanga	Calasiao Sports Complex; Calasiao, Pangasinan	Robert B. Estrella Sr. Memorial Stadium; Rosales, Pangasinan	Olivarez College (Olivarez College Gymnasium); Parañaque	Cuneta Astrodome; Pasay
Capacity: 3,000	Capacity: 3,000	Capacity: 3,000	Capacity: 3,500	Capacity: 12,000

Pasig City MPBL team	Quezon Huskers		Quezon City Galeries Taipan	Rizal Golden Coolers
Ynares Sports Arena; Pasig	Lucena Convention Center; Lucena	Quezon Convention Center; Lucena	Quezon City District 2 Gymnasium (MRB Gymnasium); Quezon City	Ynares Center Montalban; Rodriguez, Rizal
Capacity: 3,000	Capacity: 4,000	Capacity: 7,000	Capacity: 2,000	Capacity: 8,000

San Juan Knights	Val City Magic	Zamboanga Sikat
Playtime Filoil Centre; San Juan	WES Arena; Valenzuela	Mayor Vitaliano D. Agan Coliseum; Zamboanga City
Capacity: 6,000	Capacity: 2,000	Capacity: 10,000

=== Other arenas ===
Neutral	2025 MPBL playoffs
Villar Coliseum; Las Piñas	Malolos Sports & Convention Center; Malolos, Bulacan
Capacity: 4,000	Capacity: 5,000

== Regular season ==
=== Opening ceremony ===
The regular season began on March 8, 2025. As has been the case since 2023, the season opener and opening ceremony was hosted by an expansion team from the current season, this time being the Ilagan Isabela Cowboys at the Capital Arena in Ilagan, Isabela. The opening doubleheader will feature the Biñan Tatak Gel and the Abra Weavers in the first game, followed by the Sarangani Marlins and the home team Cowboys in the second game.

=== Format ===
Similar to previous seasons, all participating teams will play in a single round-robin tournament for the regular season, playing one game against every other team. The league's 30 teams will each play 29 games. In each gameday, a series of games is played in a designated home arena, with the home team usually playing in the final game.

Under the new postseason format, the top six teams in each division will advance directly to the 2025 MPBL playoffs, while teams ranked seventh through tenth will compete in a play-in tournament for the final two spots.

=== Standings ===
North Division

Pos	Team	Pld	W	L	GB
1	Abra Solid North Weavers	29	28	1	—
2	Nueva Ecija Rice Vanguards	29	27	2	1
3	San Juan Knights	29	26	3	2
4	Caloocan Batang Kankaloo	29	21 (Note: Caloocan (1.133) wins tiebreaker over Pampanga (1.029), and Pasay (0.886) based on head-to-head point quotient.)	8	7
5	Pampanga Giant Lanterns	29	21	8	7
6	Pasay Voyagers	29	21	8	7
7	Pangasinan Heatwaves	29	20	9	8
8	Ilagan Isabela Cowboys	29	15	14	13
9	Bataan Risers	29	13	16	15
10	Pasig City	29	12	17	16
11	Val City Magic	29	7 (Note: Valenzuela wins tiebreaker over Quezon City based on head-to-head match-up.)	22	21
12	Quezon City Galeries Taipan	29	7	22	21
13	Manila Batang Quiapo	29	4 (Note: Manila wins tiebreaker over Marikina based on head-to-head match-up.)	25	24
14	Marikina Shoemasters	29	4	25	24
15	Bulacan Kuyas	29	3	26	25

Source: Standings
Rules for classification: 1) Wins; 2a) If two teams are tied, head-to-head match-up; 2b) If three or more teams are tied, head-to-head point quotient; 3) overall point quotient; 4) coin toss.
Notes:

South Division

Pos	Team	Pld	W	L	GB
1	Quezon Huskers	29	25	4	—
2	Batangas City Tanduay Rum Masters	29	20	9	5
3	Rizal Golden Coolers	29	19	10	6
4	Basilan Starhorse	29	18 (Note: Basilan wins tiebreaker over General Santos based on head-to-head match-up.)	11	7
5	GenSan Warriors	29	18	11	7
6	Biñan Tatak Gel	29	17 (Note: Biñan wins tiebreaker over Zamboanga based on head-to-head match-up.)	12	8
7	Zamboanga Sikat	29	17	12	8
8	Mindoro Tamaraws	29	15	14	10
9	Davao Occidental Tigers	29	12	17	13
10	Cebu Greats	29	11	18	14
11	Sarangani Gripper Motorcycle Tire	29	10 (Note: Sarangani wins tiebreaker over Muntinlupa based on head-to-head match-up.)	19	15
12	Muntinlupa Cagers	29	10	19	15
13	Imus Braderhood	29	9	20	16
14	Bacolod Tubo Slashers	29	4	25	21
15	Parañaque Patriots	29	1	28	24

Source: Standings
Rules for classification: 1) Wins; 2a) If two teams are tied, head-to-head match-up; 2b) If three or more teams are tied, head-to-head point quotient; 3) overall point quotient; 4) coin toss.

==== Results table ====
Team	Game																												
Team	1	2	3	4	5	6	7	8	9	10	11	12	13	14	15	16	17	18	19	20	21	22	23	24	25	26	27	28	29
Abra (ABR)	BIÑ; 69–60	MAR; 97–74	PSY; 60–70	BUL; 114–69	GS; 73–53	RZL ^{(A)} 85–70	BAS; 75–64	CEB; 76–72	BAN; 96–74	SAR; 103–75	BCD; 108–77	PAR; 97–81	QZN ^{(H)} 63–53	IMS; 103–80	PGS ^{(H)} 75–68	QC; 99–77	CAL; 78–66	VAL; 132–76	NE ^{(A)} 82–71	ZAM ^{(A)} 80–60	MNL; 117–63	PAM; 94–80	ILA; 76–59	MUN; 126–70	BTG; 74–58	SJ; 84–77	PSG; 101–77	DVO; 92–56	MDR; 104–82
Bacolod (BCD)	PSG; 54–64	MUN; 73–96	MAR; 70–69	ZAM; 63–87	PAM; 91–100	DVO; 79–95	PAR; 82–65	CAL; 68–74	ABR; 77–108	SJ; 77–83	MDR; 63–76	VAL; 82–86	BUL; 63–69	SAR; 75–77	PGS; 30–50	IMS; 68–86	NE; 87–116	ILA; 73–99	QZN; 74–85	QC; 73–85	BAS; 76–73	BTG ^{(A)} 58–60	GS; 71–104	PSY ^{(A)} 84–95	MNL; 102–58	BIÑ ^{(A)} 71–82	BAN ^{(A)} 76–89	CEB; 71–80	RZL; 72–78
Basilan (BAS)	RZL; 62–76	NE ^{(A)} 66–71	VAL; 82–80*	BTG ^{(A)} 68–74	SJ; 62–72	BUL; 102–80	ABR; 64–75	CAL; 92–82	PSY ^{(A)} 74–78	BIÑ ^{(A)} 66–68	GS; 75–72	CEB; 87–55	MDR; 84–77	PSG; 84–90*	PAR; 76–65	BAN; 84–70	PGS ^{(A)} 71–83	MNL; 117–84	PAM; 89–82	BCD; 73–76	QZN ^{(A)} 54–91	DVO; 82–63	SAR; 86–79	ILA; 67–61	IMS; 106–78	ZAM; 76–64	MUN; 92–80	MAR ^{(A)} 70–51	QC; 94–81
Bataan (BAN)	PGS ^{(A)} 86–95	GS ^{(H)} 74–77	CEB; 79–69	CAL; 70–84	BTG; 65–70	SJ; 67–82	IMS; 94–77	MUN ^{(H)} 77–76*	BUL ^{(H)} 73–48	ABR; 74–96	MAR; 103–69	PSG; 85–88*	ILA ^{(H)} 67–69	RZL ^{(A)} 71–82	PSY ^{(A)} 86–84	QC; 88–95	ZAM; 82–84	BAS; 70–84	DVO ^{(H)} 74–64	MDR ^{(H)} 84–86	NE; 78–94	BIÑ ^{(H)} 73–62	MNL; 144–82	PAM ^{(H)} 90–97	PAR ^{(H)} 132–83	QZN; 65–91	SAR ^{(H)} 90–62	BCD ^{(H)} 89–76	VAL ^{(H)} 90–56
Batangas City (BTG)	QZN ^{(H)} 46–70	IMS; 90–68	RZL; 86–87	BAS ^{(H)} 74–68	BAN; 70–65	PGS ^{(H)} 79–85	SJ ^{(A)} 63–72	PSY; 82–79	ILA ^{(A)} 75–82	PAR; 92–53	SAR; 75–60	PSG; 93–86	NE; 54–71	ZAM; 82–87	CEB; 131–65	VAL ^{(H)} 92–56	BIÑ ^{(A)} 74–68	QC; 73–66	PAM ^{(H)} 65–64	CAL ^{(H)} 68–72	MUN; 89–68	BCD ^{(H)} 60–58	MAR; 108–88	MNL ^{(H)} 103–59	GS; 65–60	DVO; 66–62	ABR; 58–74	BUL ^{(H)} 81–69	MDR ^{(H)} 73–66
Biñan (BIÑ)	ABR; 60–69	MDR ^{(H)} 69–73	PGS ^{(H)} 85–71	QZN ^{(A)} 64–79	ILA ^{(H)} 87–77	VAL ^{(A)} 69–66	BUL; 86–48	SAR ^{(H)} 87–73	PSG ^{(H)} 79–72	BAS ^{(H)} 68–66	RZL ^{(H)} 66–63	GS; 69–75	PAR ^{(H)} 92–73	DVO ^{(H)} 113–118*	PAM ^{(A)} 57–60	BTG ^{(H)} 68–74	CEB ^{(H)} 81–78	MNL; 99–62	MUN; 55–47	MAR; 75–52	BAN ^{(A)} 62–73	NE ^{(A)} 64–81	CAL ^{(H)} 71–74	SJ ^{(A)} 75–80	IMS ^{(H)} 106–75	BCD ^{(H)} 82–71	ZAM; 60–56	QC ^{(A)} 101–72	PSY; 68–75
Bulacan (BUL)	QC; 80–100	PGS; 51–91	ILA; 82–109	ABR; 69–114	ZAM; 56–99	MUN; 78–104	BAS; 80–102	PSG; 88–111	BIÑ; 48–86	BAN ^{(A)} 48–73	SAR; 111–148	NE; 50–98	MAR ^{(A)} 90–100	PAR; 71–69	DVO; 62–74	BCD; 69–63	QZN; 61–91	MDR; 72–103	SJ; 75–97	CAL; 85–83	VAL; 84–88	IMS; 83–92	CEB; 71–87	MNL; 98–115	RZL ^{(A)} 59–95	PSY ^{(A)} 70–101	BTG ^{(A)} 69–81	GS; 62–106	PAM; 58–114
Caloocan (CAL)	CEB; 76–77	MDR ^{(H)} 80–67	BAN; 84–70	PSY ^{(H)} 63–48	GS; 75–72	NE ^{(H)} 53–73	RZL; 76–75	BAS; 82–92	DVO; 79–76	SJ; 61–76	BCD; 74–68	PAM; 90–87	IMS ^{(H)} 58–52	QC; 84–71	QZN ^{(A)} 71–83	MAR; 93–47	MNL; 110–92	ABR; 66–78	PSG; 82–67	BUL; 83–85	BTG ^{(A)} 72–68	PAR; 133–76	VAL; 69–55	BIÑ ^{(A)} 74–71	MUN ^{(H)} 81–58	ILA ^{(H)} 63–76	ZAM; 74–66	SAR; 93–79	PGS ^{(H)} 77–74
Cebu (CEB)	CAL; 77–76	QZN; 45–58	BAN; 69–79	SJ; 61–63	MNL ^{(A)} 79–51	MUN; 70–77	QC; 69–54	ABR; 72–76	PAR ^{(A)} 54–69	RZL; 80–91	MDR; 85–73	PSY ^{(A)} 80–107	BAS; 55–87	SAR; 95–119	BTG; 65–131	NE; 78–108	PAM ^{(A)} 66–69	BIÑ ^{(A)} 78–81	IMS; 76–63	ILA; 66–80	GS; 100–94	MAR; 104–86	PSG; 76–70	BUL; 87–71	VAL; 97–93	ZAM; 70–74	PGS ^{(A)} 77–83	DVO; 59–64	BCD; 80–71
Davao Occidental (DVO)	PAR; 70–66	NE; 60–74	PSG; 79–78*	CAL; 76–79	BCD; 95–79	MDR; 79–101	GS; 86–107	MUN; 80–89	PGS; 68–76	ZAM; 66–88	BUL; 74–62	BIÑ ^{(A)} 118–113*	PSY ^{(A)} 64–72	MAR; 72–71	RZL; 81–79*	BAN ^{(A)} 64–74	QZN; 60–91	SAR; 54–66	IMS; 88–65	ILA; 73–88	SJ; 79–95	BAS; 63–82	VAL; 84–83	BTG; 62–66	CEB; 64–59	PAM; 83–102	MNL; 124–93	ABR; 56–92	QC; 97–91
General Santos (GS)	SAR; 73–58	BAN ^{(A)} 77–74	PAM; 73–76	ABR; 53–73	CAL; 72–75	VAL; 91–96*	IMS; 74–64	ILA ^{(A)} 90–83	NE; 76–83	PGS; 88–79	DVO; 107–86	BAS; 72–75	BIÑ; 75–69	RZL; 96–89	MUN; 90–72	MNL; 99–45	PSY ^{(A)} 79–73	QZN ^{(A)} 82–86	PAR; 106–59	MAR; 101–72	CEB; 94–100	MDR; 72–76	BCD; 104–71	ZAM; 71–70	BTG; 60–65	QC; 76–61	SJ; 66–74	BUL; 106–62	PSG; 20–0
Ilagan Isabela (ILA)	SAR ^{(H)} 74–54	PSY ^{(A)} 52–56	BUL; 109–82	PGS; 94–96	BIÑ ^{(A)} 77–87	QC; 80–72	PAM; 72–77	PAR ^{(A)} 77–62	GS ^{(H)} 83–90	BTG ^{(H)} 82–75	ZAM; 62–63	BAN ^{(A)} 69–67	QZN ^{(A)} 78–96	MNL ^{(A)} 123–87	MDR; 78–86	VAL ^{(H)} 78–55	IMS; 98–72	BCD; 99–73	CEB; 80–66	SJ; 79–87	DVO; 88–73	RZL ^{(A)} 63–71	ABR; 59–76	MUN; 75–63	BAS; 61–67	NE ^{(A)} 65–89	PSG; 67–76	MAR; 106–79	CAL ^{(A)} 76–63
Imus (IMS)	MDR; 83–75	PAM; 74–79	BTG; 68–90	ZAM; 81–79	QC; 69–62	SAR; 94–89	BAN; 77–94	GS; 64–74	SJ; 83–89	VAL; 78–60	MUN; 57–64	MNL; 122–111	CAL ^{(A)} 52–58	MAR; 101–104*	ABR; 80–103	PAR; 82–60	RZL; 77–114	BCD; 86–68	ILA; 72–98	CEB; 63–76	DVO; 65–88	BUL; 92–83	NE; 62–76	PSG; 81–82*	BAS; 78–106	BIÑ ^{(A)} 75–106	QZN; 56–85	PSY; 50–87	PGS; 72–108
Manila (MNL)	MAR; 93–89	RZL; 81–111	NE ^{(H)} 83–113	PSY ^{(A)} 75–107	CEB ^{(H)} 51–79	PAM ^{(H)} 95–127	ZAM; 84–106	QZN; 82–123	MUN; 89–112	QC ^{(H)} 79–91	IMS; 111–122	MDR; 56–95	SAR ^{(H)} 87–111	ILA ^{(H)} 87–123	GS; 45–99	CAL; 92–110	PSG; 92–89	BIÑ; 62–99	BAS; 84–117	SJ ^{(A)} 61–88	ABR; 63–117	BAN; 82–144	BTG ^{(A)} 59–103	BUL; 115–98	BCD; 58–102	PGS; 66–111	VAL ^{(H)} 104–122	DVO ^{(H)} 93–124	PAR; 20–0
Marikina (MAR)	MNL; 89–93	ABR; 74–97	PAM; 66–68	VAL; 82–85	QZN; 54–74	ZAM; 74–75	MUN; 63–72	BCD; 69–70	QC; 70–67	MDR; 80–101	BAN; 69–103	BUL ^{(H)} 100–90	NE; 52–88	IMS; 104–101*	PGS; 79–108	CAL; 47–93	DVO; 71–72	PAR; 92–87	SAR; 83–96	GS; 72–101	BIÑ; 52–75	CEB; 86–104	BTG; 88–108	RZL; 78–92	PSG; 72–76	ILA; 79–106	PSY ^{(A)} 89–95	BAS; 51–70	SJ ^{(H)} 61–78
Mindoro (MDR)	IMS; 75–83	BIÑ ^{(A)} 73–69	CAL ^{(A)} 67–80	NE ^{(A)} 72–104	SJ; 72–77	RZL ^{(A)} 61–77	PAR ^{(H)} 68–58	ZAM; 81–79	PAM; 90–94	MAR; 101–80	DVO; 101–79	CEB; 73–85	MNL; 95–56	BCD; 76–63	BAS; 77–84	SAR; 79–65	ILA; 86–77	MUN ^{(H)} 94–76	BUL; 103–72	QC; 85–96	BAN ^{(A)} 86–84	PSY ^{(A)} 75–108	GS; 76–72	QZN; 72–88	VAL; 100–74	PSG; 78–81	PGS; 89–79	BTG ^{(A)} 66–73	ABR; 82–104
Muntinlupa (MUN)	BUL; 104–78	CEB; 77–70	MAR; 72–63	BCD; 96–73	BAN ^{(A)} 76–77*	VAL; 72–63	MNL; 112–89	ZAM; 75–82	IMS; 64–57	PAR; 83–60	DVO; 89–80	QC; 75–68	PGS; 59–66	GS; 72–90	SJ; 43–77	MDR ^{(A)} 76–94	NE; 74–86	PSY ^{(A)} 64–81	BIÑ; 47–55	PSG; 71–79	BTG; 68–89	SAR; 68–72	ILA; 63–75	ABR; 70–126	CAL ^{(A)} 58–81	BAS; 80–92	RZL; 84–89	QZN; 0–20	PAM; 0–20
Nueva Ecija (NE)	PSY; 84–72	BAS ^{(H)} 71–66	MNL ^{(A)} 113–83	MDR ^{(H)} 104–72	VAL; 100–84	DVO; 74–60	CAL ^{(A)} 73–53	PGS ^{(A)} 101–94*	GS; 83–76	BUL; 98–50	SJ ^{(H)} 97–86	MAR; 88–52	BTG; 71–54	PAM ^{(A)} 82–74	ZAM ^{(H)} 84–83	CEB; 108–78	MUN; 86–74	BCD; 116–87	ABR ^{(H)} 71–82	BAN; 94–78	PSG; 91–67	BIÑ ^{(H)} 81–64	IMS; 76–62	QZN ^{(H)} 77–78	ILA ^{(H)} 89–65	SAR; 115–67	QC; 94–38	PAR; 138–72	RZL ^{(A)} 79–67
Pampanga (PAM)	IMS; 79–74	MAR; 68–66	GS; 76–73	PGS; 77–81	MNL ^{(A)} 127–95	ILA; 77–72	MDR; 94–90	BCD; 100–91	PSG; 91–55	QZN ^{(A)} 88–82	CAL; 87–90	ZAM; 63–76	PSY; 86–78	NE ^{(H)} 74–82	RZL ^{(H)} 74–71	BIÑ ^{(H)} 60–57	CEB ^{(H)} 69–66	SAR; 95–85	BTG ^{(A)} 64–65	VAL ^{(H)} 69–64	BAS; 82–89	ABR; 80–94	QC; 90–73	BAN ^{(A)} 97–90	SJ; 68–73	PAR ^{(H)} 135–78	DVO; 102–83	MUN; 20–0	BUL; 114–58
Pangasinan (PGS)	BAN ^{(H)} 95–86	BUL; 91–51	BIÑ ^{(A)} 71–85	ILA; 96–94	PAM; 81–77	BTG ^{(A)} 85–79	NE ^{(H)} 94–101*	QZN ^{(H)} 74–92	GS; 79–88	PSY; 91–78	DVO; 76–68	MUN; 66–59	MAR; 108–79	ABR ^{(A)} 68–75	BCD; 50–30	SJ ^{(A)} 66–73	BAS ^{(H)} 83–71	VAL; 114–90	SAR; 81–55	QC; 91–77	PAR; 135–76	ZAM; 93–98*	PSG; 82–72	CEB ^{(H)} 83–77	MNL; 111–66	MDR; 79–89	RZL ^{(H)} 75–67	IMS; 108–72	CAL ^{(A)} 74–77
Parañaque (PAR)	DVO; 66–70	MDR ^{(A)} 58–68	ILA ^{(H)} 62–77	PSY ^{(H)} 62–76	CEB ^{(H)} 69–54	BCD; 65–82	BTG; 53–92	MUN; 60–83	PSG ^{(H)} 70–85	ABR; 81–97	BUL; 69–71	BIÑ ^{(A)} 73–92	SJ; 56–110	IMS; 60–82	BAS; 65–76	QZN; 68–96	MAR; 87–92	GS; 59–106	ZAM; 74–128	CAL; 76–133	PGS; 76–135	VAL; 105–113	BAN ^{(A)} 83–132	QC; 75–90	RZL ^{(A)} 74–121	PAM ^{(A)} 78–135	SAR; 89–103	NE; 72–138	MNL; 0–20
Pasay (PSY)	NE; 72–84	ILA ^{(H)} 56–52	ABR; 70–60	MNL ^{(H)} 107–75	CAL ^{(A)} 48–63	QZN; 83–81	SAR ^{(H)} 91–83	PAR ^{(A)} 76–62	BTG; 79–82	BAS ^{(H)} 78–74	SJ ^{(H)} 74–75	PGS; 78–91	CEB ^{(H)} 107–80	PAM ^{(H)} 78–86	BAN ^{(H)} 84–86	VAL; 81–66	DVO ^{(H)} 72–64	GS ^{(H)} 73–79	ZAM ^{(H)} 75–63	MUN ^{(H)} 81–64	PSG ^{(H)} 91–83	MDR ^{(H)} 108–75	QC ^{(H)} 87–74	RZL ^{(A)} 96–89**	BCD ^{(H)} 95–84	BUL ^{(H)} 101–70	MAR ^{(H)} 95–89	IMS; 87–50	BIÑ; 75–68
Pasig City (PSG)	BCD; 64–54	BUL; 111–88	QZN; 56–75	DVO; 78–79*	ZAM; 76–92	PAM; 55–91	BIÑ ^{(A)} 72–79	BAN; 88–85*	PAR ^{(A)} 85–70	BTG; 86–93	QC; 85–79	VAL; 62–58	BAS; 90–84*	SJ ^{(H)} 64–77	SAR; 95–96	MNL; 89–92	CAL; 67–82	RZL; 88–94	PSY ^{(A)} 83–91	MUN; 79–71	NE; 67–91	CEB; 70–76	PGS; 72–82	IMS; 82–81*	MAR; 76–72	ILA; 76–67	MDR; 81–78	ABR; 77–101	GS; 0–20
Quezon (QZN)	BTG ^{(A)} 70–46	CEB; 58–45	BIÑ ^{(H)} 79–64	MAR; 74–54	PSY; 81–83	QC; 79–66	PSG; 75–56	MNL; 123–82	PGS ^{(A)} 92–74	PAM ^{(H)} 82–88	VAL; 75–55	ILA ^{(H)} 96–78	ABR ^{(A)} 53–63	CAL ^{(H)} 83–71	BUL; 91–61	PAR; 96–68	GS ^{(H)} 86–82	DVO; 91–60	BCD; 85–74	RZL ^{(A)} 77–83	BAS ^{(H)} 91–54	SJ ^{(H)} 84–83	NE ^{(A)} 78–77	SAR; 94–77	MDR; 88–72	BAN; 91–65	IMS; 85–56	ZAM; 64–54	MUN; 20–0
Quezon City (QC)	BUL; 100–80	VAL; 66–74	SAR; 84–76	IMS; 62–69	ILA; 72–80	QZN; 66–79	CEB; 54–69	MAR; 67–70	RZL; 67–77	MNL ^{(A)} 91–79	ZAM; 77–82	MUN; 68–75	CAL; 71–84	PSG; 79–85	BAN; 95–88	ABR; 77–99	BTG; 66–73	MDR; 96–85	SJ; 68–92	BCD; 85–73	PGS; 77–91	PSY ^{(A)} 74–87	PAM; 73–90	PAR; 90–75	GS; 61–76	NE; 38–94	BIÑ ^{(H)} 72–101	BAS; 81–94	DVO; 91–97
Rizal (RZL)	BAS; 76–62	MNL; 111–81	BTG; 87–86	SAR; 106–77	MDR ^{(H)} 77–61	ABR ^{(H)} 70–85	CAL; 75–76	SJ ^{(H)} 78–79	QC; 77–67	CEB; 91–80	VAL ^{(H)} 101–76	BIÑ ^{(A)} 63–66	BAN ^{(H)} 82–71	GS; 89–96	PAM ^{(A)} 71–74	IMS; 114–77	DVO; 79–81*	ZAM ^{(H)} 69–61	PSG; 94–88	QZN ^{(H)} 83–77	ILA ^{(H)} 71–63	PSY ^{(H)} 89–96**	MAR; 92–78	BUL ^{(H)} 95–59	PAR ^{(H)} 121–74	MUN; 89–84	PGS ^{(A)} 67–75	NE ^{(H)} 67–79	BCD; 78–72
San Juan (SJ)	CEB; 63–61	MDR; 77–72	BAS; 72–62	BAN; 82–67	BTG ^{(H)} 72–63	RZL ^{(A)} 79–78	IMS; 89–83	CAL; 76–61	PSY ^{(A)} 75–74	NE ^{(A)} 86–97	BCD; 83–77	VAL; 90–67	PAR; 110–56	MUN; 77–43	PSG ^{(A)} 77–64	PGS ^{(H)} 73–66	BUL; 97–75	QC; 92–68	MNL ^{(A)} 88–61	ILA; 87–79	ZAM ^{(H)} 80–69	DVO; 95–79	QZN ^{(A)} 83–84	BIÑ ^{(H)} 80–75	PAM; 73–68	SAR; 114–68	GS; 74–66	ABR; 77–84	MAR ^{(A)} 78–61
Sarangani (SAR)	ILA ^{(A)} 54–74	GS; 58–73	ZAM; 67–82	QC; 76–84	RZL; 77–106	IMS; 89–94	PSY ^{(A)} 83–91	VAL ^{(A)} 102–93	BIÑ ^{(A)} 73–87	BUL; 148–111	ABR; 75–103	BTG; 60–75	MNL ^{(A)} 111–87	CEB; 119–95	MDR; 65–79	BCD; 77–75	PSG; 96–95	PAM; 85–95	MAR; 96–83	DVO; 66–54	PGS; 55–81	MUN; 72–68	BAS; 79–86	QZN; 77–94	NE; 67–115	SJ; 68–114	BAN ^{(A)} 62–90	PAR; 103–89	CAL; 79–93
Valenzuela (VAL)	ZAM; 57–77	QC; 74–66	BAS; 80–82*	MAR; 85–82	NE; 84–100	BIÑ ^{(H)} 66–69	GS; 96–91*	SAR ^{(H)} 93–102	MUN; 63–72	IMS; 60–78	RZL ^{(A)} 76–101	QZN; 55–75	SJ; 67–90	BCD; 86–82	PSG; 58–62	PSY; 66–81	BTG ^{(A)} 56–92	ILA ^{(A)} 55–78	ABR; 76–132	PGS; 90–114	PAM ^{(A)} 64–69	BUL; 88–84	CAL; 55–69	PAR; 113–105	CEB; 93–97	DVO; 83–84	MDR; 74–100	MNL ^{(A)} 122–104	BAN ^{(A)} 56–90
Zamboanga (ZAM)	VAL; 77–57	SAR; 82–67	IMS; 79–81	BUL; 99–56	MAR; 75–74	MNL; 106–84	MDR; 79–81	BCD; 87–63	PSG; 92–76	MUN; 82–75	ILA; 63–62	QC; 82–77	PAM; 76–63	DVO; 88–66	BTG; 87–82	NE ^{(A)} 83–84	BAN; 84–82	PSY ^{(A)} 63–75	RZL ^{(A)} 61–69	PAR; 128–74	ABR ^{(H)} 60–80	SJ ^{(A)} 69–80	PGS; 98–93*	GS; 70–71	CEB; 74–70	BAS; 64–76	BIÑ; 56–60	QZN; 54–64	CAL; 66–74

Source: Schedule
Legend: Blue = win; Red = loss; Matches with lighter background shading were decided after overtime. (*) Number of asterisks denotes number of overtime periods

Notes

- Any game details are subject to change. The full schedule is revealed over time as the season progresses.
- Games that are played home or away are indicated by the superscript after the opposing team's abbreviation (H for home and A for away). Games with no superscript are neutral-site.
- The Bacolod-Pangasinan game was stopped before the opening of the second half due to the report of three players having no Special Guest Athlete (SGA) license from Games and Amusements Board. The final score was 50–30 in favor of Pangasinan via default.
- The Muntinlupa Cagers decided to forfeit their last two games due to multiple player injuries and commitment to play in 2025–26 PBA season.
- Pasig City decided to forfeit the game against the GenSan Warriors.
- The Parañaque Patriots decided to forfeit the game against Manila Batang Quiapo. Thus, both teams were eliminated.

Postponed games

- All games scheduled from July 21 to 24 were postponed due to heavy rains affecting Greater Manila Area and nearby areas.
- All games scheduled on August 22 and 26 were postponed due to heavy rains affecting Greater Manila Area and nearby areas.

=== Home-and-away records ===
Team	Division	Home		Neutral		Away	
Team	Division	GP	Record	GP	Record	GP	Record
Abra Solid North Weavers	North	2	2–0 (1.000)	24	23–1 (.958)	3	3–0 (1.000)
Bacolod Tubo Slashers	South	—N/a		25	4–21 (.160)	3	0–3 (.000)
Basilan Starhorse	South	—N/a		23	18–5 (.783)	7	0–7 (.000)
Bataan Risers	North	12	8–4 (.667)	14	4–10 (.286)	3	1–2 (.333)
Batangas City Tanduay Rum Masters	South	11	8–3 (.727)	15	11–4 (.733)	1	1–2 (.333)
Biñan Tatak Gel	South	14	10–4 (.714)	8	5–3 (.625)	7	2–5 (.286)
Bulacan Kuyas	North	—N/a		24	3–21 (.125)	5	0–5 (.000)
Caloocan Batang Kankaloo	North	6	4–2 (.667)	18	13–5 (.722)	3	2–1 (.667)
Cebu Greats	South	—N/a		23	9–14 (.391)	7	2–5 (.286)
Davao Occidental Tigers	South	—N/a		25	10–15 (.400)	4	2–2 (.500)
GenSan Warriors	South	—N/a		25	15–10 (.600)	4	3–1 (.750)
Ilagan Isabela Cowboys	North	4	3–1 (.750)	16	8–8 (.500)	9	4–5 (.444)
Imus Braderhood	South	1	0–1 (.000)	25	9–16 (.360)	2	0–2 (.000)
Manila Batang Quiapo	North	9	1–8 (.111)	18	4–14 (.222)	2	0–2 (.000)
Marikina Shoemasters	North	2	1–1 (.500)	26	3–23 (.115)	1	0–1 (.000)
Mindoro Tamaraws	South	2	2–0 (1.000)	20	11–9 (.550)	8	3–5 (.375)
Muntinlupa Cagers	South	—N/a		25	10–15 (.400) (Note: The remaining two games of Muntinlupa were decided to forfeit against Pampanga and Quezon.)	4	0–4 (.000)
Nueva Ecija Rice Vanguards	North	8	6–2 (.750)	16	16–0 (1.000)	5	5–0 (1.000)
Pampanga Giant Lanterns	North	5	4–1 (.800)	19	13–6 (.684)	5	4–1 (.800)
Pangasinan Heatwaves	North	7	4–3 (.571)	18	15–3 (.833)	4	1–3 (.250)
Parañaque Patriots	South	4	1–3 (.250)	21	0–21 (.000)	4	0–4 (.000)
Pasay Voyagers	North	18	14–4 (.778)	8	5–3 (.625)	3	2–1 (.667)
Pasig City	North	—N/a		23	11–12 (.478)	5	0–5 (.000)
Quezon Huskers	South	7	6–1 (.857)	17	16–1 (.941)	5	3–2 (.600)
Quezon City Galeries Taipan	North	1	0–1 (.000)	26	6–20 (.231)	2	1–1 (.500)
Rizal Golden Coolers	South	12	9–3 (.750)	14	11–3 (.786)	3	0–3 (.000)
San Juan Knights	North	5	5–0 (1.000)	18	17–1 (.944)	6	4–2 (.667)
Sarangani Gripper Motorcycle Tire	South	—N/a		22	7–15 (.318)	6	2–4 (.333)
Val City Magic	North	2	0–2 (.000)	22	7–15 (.318)	6	0–6 (.000)
Zamboanga Sikat	South	1	0–1 (.000)	24	17–7 (.708)	4	0–4 (.000)

== Play-in tournament ==
In each division, the seventh-place team will play against the eighth-place team with the winning team clinching the seventh seed in the playoffs. On the other hand, the ninth-place team will play against the tenth-place team with the losing team being eliminated from playoff contention. The loser of the 7–8 game will then face-off against the winner of the 9–10 game for the eighth seed in the playoffs, with the losing team being eliminated. The first two play-in games in each division are hosted by the seventh-place team in each division, while the final play-in gameday will be hosted by the highest-ranked play-in team remaining.

Teams in bold won the game indicated. Teams in italics have homecourt advantage under the aforementioned rules. The numbers to the left of each team indicate the team's regular season ranking in its division, while the numbers to the right indicate the number of points the team scored in that game.

=== North Division ===
**Play-in games**
7	**Pangasinan** (**OT**)	**98**
8	Ilagan Isabela	91
9	**Bataan**	**99**
10	Pasig City	78

**No. 8 seed game**
8	**Ilagan Isabela**	**74**
9	Bataan	71

**Final seeds**
7	Pangasinan	No. 7 seed
8	Ilagan Isabela	No. 8 seed

=== South Division ===
**Play-in games**
7	**Zamboanga**	**71**
8	Mindoro	62
9	Davao Occidental	57
10	**Cebu**	**65**

**No. 8 seed game**
8	**Mindoro**	**92**
10	Cebu	89

**Final seeds**
7	Zamboanga	No. 7 seed
8	Mindoro	No. 8 seed

== Playoffs ==
The 2025 MPBL playoffs started in October 2025. The first two rounds, the division quarterfinals and semifinals, are best-of-three series, while the last two rounds, the division finals and national finals, are best-of-five series.

=== Bracket ===
Teams in bold advanced to the next round. Teams in italics have homecourt advantage for the series. The numbers to the left of each team indicate the team's seeding in its division, while the numbers to the right indicate the number of games the team won in that round.

Division quarterfinals (best-of-3)	Division semifinals (best-of-3)
N1	**Abra**	**2**
N8	Ilagan Isabela	0
N1	**Abra**	**2**
N4	Caloocan	0
N4	**Caloocan**	**2**
N5	Pampanga	0
**North Division**
N2	Nueva Ecija	1
N7	**Pangasinan**	**2**
N7	**Pangasinan**	**2**
N3	San Juan	1
N3	**San Juan**	**2**
N6	Pasay	0
S1	**Quezon**	**2**
S8	Mindoro	0
S1	**Quezon**	**2**
S5	General Santos	0
S4	Basilan	1
S5	**General Santos**	**2**
**South Division**
S2	**Batangas City**	**2**
S7	Zamboanga	1
S2	Batangas City	1
S6	**Biñan**	**2**
S3	Rizal	0
S6	**Biñan**	**2**

Division finals (best-of-5)
N1	**Abra**	**3**
N7	Pangasinan	0
S1	**Quezon**	**3**
S6	Biñan	2

National finals (best-of-5)
N1	**Abra**	**3**
S1	Quezon	0

=== Division quarterfinals ===
==== North Division ====
Team 1	Series	Team 2	Game 1	Game 2	Game 3
**(1) Abra Solid North Weavers**	**2**–0	(8) Ilagan Isabela Cowboys	**98**–58	**73**–69	—
(2) Nueva Ecija Rice Vanguards	1–**2**	**(7) Pangasinan Heatwaves**	85–**86**	**82**–72	80–**82**
**(3) San Juan Knights**	**2**–0	(6) Pasay Voyagers	**94**–89 (2OT)	**77**–66	—
**(4) Caloocan Batang Kankaloo**	**2**–0	(5) Pampanga Giant Lanterns	**65**–61	**81**–71	—

==== South Division ====
Team 1	Series	Team 2	Game 1	Game 2	Game 3
**(1) Quezon Huskers**	**2**–0	(8) Mindoro Tamaraws	**83**–74	**104**–102 (2OT)	—
**(2) Batangas City Tanduay Rum Masters**	**2**–1	(7) Zamboanga Sikat	**70**–61	72–**78**	**95**–87
(3) Rizal Golden Coolers	0–**2**	**(6) Biñan Tatak Gel**	68–**77**	72–**81**	—
(4) Basilan Starhorse	1–**2**	**(5) GenSan Warriors**	78–**85**	**116**–114 (2OT)	67–**79**

=== Division semifinals ===
==== North Division ====
Team 1	Series	Team 2	Game 1	Game 2	Game 3
**(1) Abra Solid North Weavers**	**2**–0	(4) Caloocan Batang Kankaloo	**80**–54	**74**–62	—
(3) San Juan Knights	1–**2**	**(7) Pangasinan Heatwaves**	57–**67**	**83**–66	80–**83**

==== South Division ====
Team 1	Series	Team 2	Game 1	Game 2	Game 3
**(1) Quezon Huskers**	**2**–0	(5) GenSan Warriors	**103**–75	**95**–85	—
(2) Batangas City Tanduay Rum Masters	1–**2**	**(6) Biñan Tatak Gel**	67–**72**	**70**–62	75–**80**

=== Division finals ===
==== North Division ====
Team 1	Series	Team 2	Game 1	Game 2	Game 3	Game 4	Game 5
**(1) Abra Solid North Weavers**	**3**–0	(7) Pangasinan Heatwaves	**77**–58	**66**–59	**99**–74	—	—

==== South Division ====
Team 1	Series	Team 2	Game 1	Game 2	Game 3	Game 4	Game 5
**(1) Quezon Huskers**	**3**–2	(6) Biñan Tatak Gel	**57**–55	65–**68**	**66**–56	53–**57**	**56**–49

=== National finals ===
Team 1	Series	Team 2	Game 1	Game 2	Game 3	Game 4	Game 5
**(N1) Abra Solid North Weavers**	**3**–0	(S1) Quezon Huskers	**81**–80 (OT)	**62**–58	**94**–85 (OT)	—	—

== All-Star Game ==
2025 MPBL All-Star Game
North All-Stars	South All-Stars
81	82
Head coach: Yong Garcia (Abra Solid North Weavers)	Head coach: Eric Gonzales (Quezon Huskers)
	1	2	3	4	Total
North All-Stars	22	18	24	17	81
South All-Stars	27	12	23	20	82
- Date: September 6, 2025
- Venue: Alonte Sports Arena, Biñan, Laguna
- MVP: Judel Fuentes (Quezon Huskers)
- Network: Solar Sports

The 2025 MPBL All-Star Game, the league's sixth overall, took place on September 6 at Alonte Sports Arena in Biñan, Laguna, the home arena of the Biñan Tatak Gel.

=== Coaches ===
A head coach from each division, usually from a higher-ranked team, is selected to represent their respective divisions. On August 26, Yong Garcia of the Abra Solid North Weavers and Eric Gonzales of the Quezon Huskers were announced as this season's all-star coaches. The latter was coached his second all-star team.

=== Lineups ===
The starters were announced on August 25, 2025. In the North Division, Jaycee Marcelino was selected as an all-star starter for the third time and his first with the Nueva Ecija Rice Vanguards. Orlan Wamar of the San Juan Knights made his third appearance as an all-star starter. Abra's Dave Ildefonso, Jeff Manday of the Caloocan Batang Kankaloo, and Larry Muyang of the Pampanga Giant Lanterns made their all-star debuts.

In the South Division, Levi Hernandez of the Batangas City Tanduay Rum Masters made his third All-Star appearance and his first as a starter, while Quezon's Ljay Gonzales made his second appearance as a starter. Making their debut in the All-Star Game was Eric Camson of the Rizal Golden Coolers, Abdul Sawat of the Zamboanga Sikat, and Kyle Tolentino of the GenSan Warriors.

The reserves were announced two days before the event on September 4, 2025. In the North Division, Robby Celiz of the Nueva Ecija Rice Vanguards made his fourth all-star appearance and his third as a reserve, while Archie Concepcion of the Pampanga Giant Lanterns made his third all-star appearance and his second as a reserve. Christian Fajarito of the Pasay Voyagers made his second all-star appearance and his first as a reserve. Arth Dela Cruz of the Ilagan Isabela Cowboys was selected as an all-star reserve for the second straight season. Making their All-Star debuts are Raven Gonzales and Marwin Taywan of the Abra Solid North Weavers, Michael Calisaan of the San Juan Knights, Vic Manuel of the Pangasinan Heatwaves, Mitchelle Maynes of the Bataan Risers, and Warlo Batac of Pasig City.

In the South Division, Judel Fuentes and Ximone Sandagon of the Quezon Huskers made their second all-star appearances and their first as reserves. Making their All-Star debuts are Rizal's Samboy de Leon, Basilan's Alex Cabagnot, Biñan's Marc Pingris and Warren Bonifacio, Zamboanga's JP Cauilan, Mindoro's Ino Comboy, Cebu's Jun Manzo, and Muntinlupa's Marvin Hayes.

North All-Stars
Pos.	Player	Team	No. of selections
Starters
	Dave Ildefonso	Abra Weavers	1
	Jaycee Marcelino	Nueva Ecija Rice Vanguards	3
	Orlan Wamar Jr.	San Juan Knights	3
	Jeff Manday	Caloocan Batang Kankaloo	1
	Larry Muyang	Pampanga Giant Lanterns	1
Reserves
	Robby Celiz	Nueva Ecija Rice Vanguards	4
	Archie Concepcion	Pampanga Giant Lanterns	3
	Christian Fajarito	Pasay Voyagers	2
	Arth Dela Cruz	Ilagan Isabela Cowboys	2
	Raven Gonzales	Abra Weavers	1
	Marwin Taywan	Abra Weavers	1
	Michael Calisaan	San Juan Knights	1
	Vic Manuel	Pangasinan Heatwaves	1
	Mitchelle Maynes	Bataan Risers	1
	Warlo Batac	Pasig City	1
Head coach: Yong Garcia (Abra Solid North Weavers)

South All-Stars
Pos.	Player	Team	No. of selections
Starters
	Levi Hernandez	Batangas City Tanduay Rum Masters	3
	Ljay Gonzales	Quezon Huskers	2
	Eric Camson	Rizal Golden Coolers	1
	Abdul Sawat	Zamboanga Sikat	1
	Kyle Tolentino	GenSan Warriors	1
Reserves
	Judel Fuentes	Quezon Huskers	2
	Ximone Sandagon	Quezon Huskers	2
	Samboy de Leon	Rizal Golden Coolers	1
	Alex Cabagnot	Basilan Starhorse	1
	Marc Pingris	Biñan Tatak Gel	2
	Warren Bonifacio	Biñan Tatak Gel	1
	JP Cauilan	Zamboanga Sikat	1
	Wendelino Comboy	Mindoro Tamaraws	1
	Jun Manzo	Cebu Greats	1
	Marvin Hayes	Muntinlupa Cagers	1
Head coach: Eric Gonzales (Quezon Huskers)

=== Game ===
Solar Sports

September 6, 2025
8:00 pm

Boxscore

North All-Stars	81–82	South All-Stars
Scoring by quarter: 22–27, 18–12, 24–23, 17–20
Pts: Jaycee Marcelino 21; Rebs: Michael Calisaan 10; Asts: Orlan Wamar Jr. 10		Pts: Judel Fuentes 18; Rebs: Samboy de Leon 10; Asts: Ljay Gonzales 6

Alonte Sports Arena, Biñan, Laguna

== Statistics ==
=== Individual leaders ===
End of Regular season

Category	Player	Team	Statistic
Points per game	Dave Ildefonso	Abra Weavers	18.2
Rebounds per game	Larry Muyang	Pampanga Giant Lanterns	10.5
Assists per game	Orlan Wamar Jr.	San Juan Knights	7.6
Steals per game	Jaycee Marcelino	Nueva Ecija Rice Vanguards	2.4
Blocks per game	Raven Gonzales	Abra Weavers	1.8

=== Team leaders ===
As of September 13, 2025

Category	Team	Statistic
Points per game	Abra Weavers	90.1
Rebounds per game	Abra Weavers	52.5
Assists per game	Nueva Ecija Rice Vanguards	27.0
Steals per game	Nueva Ecija Rice Vanguards	10.8
Blocks per game	Abra Weavers	5.0
Turnovers per game	Cebu Classic	16.5

== Awards ==
=== Individual season awards ===
The league's individual awards were given out on December 16, 2025 before game 3 of the national finals series at the Quezon Convention Center in Lucena. The Finals Most Valuable Player and Coach of the Year will be awarded at the conclusion of the national finals.

Award	Recipient	Team
Most Valuable Player	Dave Ildefonso	Abra Weavers
Finals Most Valuable Player	Jason Brickman	Abra Weavers
Defensive Player of the Year	Antonio Bonsubre, Jr.	Caloocan Batang Kankaloo
Rookie of the Year	Raven Gonzales	Abra Weavers
Homegrown Player of the Year	Prince Casin	Caloocan Batang Kankaloo
Most Improved Player	Warlo Batac	Pasig City
Coach of the Year	Yong Garcia	Abra Weavers
Executive of the Year	Angelo Alonte	Biñan Tatak Gel
Sportsmanship award	Nikko Panganiban	San Juan Knights

=== All-MPBL teams ===
All-MPBL First Team
Player	Team
Dave Ildefonso	Abra Weavers
Vic Manuel	Pangasinan Heatwaves
Ljay Gonzales	Quezon Huskers
Christian Fajarito	Pasay Voyagers
Kenny Rocacurva	Biñan Tatak Gel

All-MPBL Second Team
Player	Team
Larry Muyang	Pampanga Giant Lanterns
Jaycee Marcelino	Nueva Ecija Rice Vanguards
Eric Camson	Rizal Golden Coolers
Orlan Wamar, Jr.	San Juan Knights
Levi Hernandez	Batangas City Tanduay Rum Masters

=== Player of the Week ===
Week	Player	Ref.
March 8–15, 2025	Jaycee Marcelino (Nueva Ecija Rice Vanguards) (1/2)	
March 17–22, 2025	Eric Camson (Rizal Golden Coolers)	
March 24–29, 2025	Vic Manuel (Pangasinan Heatwaves)	
March 31 – April 5, 2025	Michael Calisaan (San Juan Knights)	
April 7–12, 2025	Dave Ildefonso (Abra Weavers) (1/4)	
April 14–15, 2025	Not awarded	
April 22–26, 2025	Sherwin Concepcion (Basilan Viva Portmasters)	
April 28 – May 3, 2025	Arth dela Cruz (Ilagan Isabela Cowboys)	
May 14–17, 2025	Not awarded	
May 19–24, 2025	Dave Ildefonso (Abra Weavers) (2/4)	
May 26–31, 2025	Nemesis dela Cruz (Marikina Shoemasters)	
June 2–7, 2025	Alex Cabagnot (Basilan Starhorse)	
June 9–14, 2025	Philip Paniamogan (Batangas City Tanduay Rum Masters)	
June 16–21, 2025	Axel Iñigo (Mindoro Tamaraws)	
June 23–28, 2025	Marwin Taywan (Abra Weavers)	
June 30 – July 5, 2025	Ljay Gonzales (Quezon Huskers)	
July 7–12, 2025	Dave Ildefonso (Abra Weavers) (3/4)	
July 14–19, 2025	Not awarded	
July 21–26, 2025	Not awarded	
July 28 – August 2, 2025	Mark Meneses (Cebu Greats)	
August 4–9, 2025	Dave Ildefonso (Abra Weavers) (4/4)	
August 11–16, 2025	JP Cauilan (Zamboanga Sikat)	
August 18–23, 2025	Diego Dario (Quezon Huskers)	
August 25–30, 2025	Levi Hernandez (Batangas City Tanduay Rum Masters)	
September 1–5, 2025	Jan Pastias (Bacolod Tubo Slashers)	
September 8–13, 2025	Warlo Batac (Pasig City)	
September 15–20, 2025	Encho Serrano (Abra Weavers)	
September 22–27, 2025	Jaycee Marcelino (Nueva Ecija Rice Vanguards) (2/2)	

== Notable events ==
- On March 8, 2025, the league held its first games at the Capital Arena in Ilagan, Isabela. It was also the first home venue used by the Ilagan Isabela Cowboys.
- On March 10, 2025, the league held its first games at Robert B. Estrella Sr. Memorial Stadium in Rosales, Pangasinan. It was also the second home venue used by the Pangasinan Heatwaves.
- On March 20, 2025, the league held its first games at Rizal Memorial Coliseum in Manila. It was the third home venue used by the Manila Batang Quiapo.
- On April 1, 2025, the league held its first games at Ynares Center Montalban in Rodriguez, Rizal. It was the third home venue used by the Rizal Golden Coolers.
- On April 14, 2025, the Bacolod Tubo Slashers won against the Marikina Verdiamonds Jewellers, 80–79, ending the longest losing streak in league history at 27 games dating back to the previous season.
- On April 28, 2025, the Bulacan Kuyas lost to the Bataan Risers, 48–73, tying Bacolod's 27-game losing streak, also dating back to the previous season.
- On August 12, 2025, Michole Sorela of GenSan Warriors was permanently banned and fined ₱200,000 due to assaulting Jonas Tibayan of Mindoro Tamaraws during the August 11 game in which resulted in serious physical injuries.
- During the PBA season 50 draft on September 7, 2025, Geo Chiu became the second MPBL player to be selected first overall in the PBA draft after Justine Baltazar last season.
- On September 22, 2025, the league held its first games at the Quezon City District 2 Gymnasium in Quezon City. It was also the fifth home venue used by the Quezon City Galeries Taipan.
- On October 30, 2025, the league held its first games at the Batangas Province Events Center in Batangas City. It was also the fifth home venue used by the Batangas City Tanduay Rum Masters.

== Records and milestones ==
=== Records ===
- May 5, 2025:
  - The Sarangani Gripper Motorcycle Tire broke the record for most points scored by a single team in a game with 148 points, surpassing the previous record set by the San Juan Knights (146) on September 13, 2022.
  - In the same game, Sarangani and the Bulacan Kuyas combined for 259 points, which is the most combined points scored between two teams in a game. The previous record was 257, which was shared between two pairings: Sarangani–Nueva Ecija on June 3, 2023, and Bacolod–Imus on September 27, 2024.
  - In the same game, Bulacan Kuyas' loss to the Sarangani Gripper Motorcycle Tire broke the record for longest overall losing streak at 28 games. The streak was eventually ended on 29 games after Bulacan won over Parañaque.
- September 10, 2025 – Orlan Wamar of San Juan Knights sets an all-time assist record in league's history with 25 assists against Sarangani Gripper Motorcycle Tire.
- September 22, 2025 – The Abra Solid North Weavers broke the record for the longest regular season winning streak, surpassing the previous record set by the Pampanga Giant Lanterns with 23 straight wins.
- September 30, 2025 – The Abra Solid North Weavers set the record for the longest regular season winning streak with 26 straight wins.

=== Milestones ===
- March 10, 2025 – John Wilson became the first player to reach 2,000 MPBL career points.
- March 15, 2025 – Marco Balagtas became the 50th player to reach 1,000 MPBL career points.
- April 9, 2025 – Ryan Costelo became the 51st player to reach 1,000 MPBL career points.
- April 10, 2025 – Yves Sazon became the second player to reach 2,000 MPBL career points.
- May 15, 2025 – Domark Matillano became the 52nd player to reach 1,000 MPBL career points.
- May 22, 2025 – Axel Iñigo became the 53rd player to reach 1,000 MPBL career points.
- June 3, 2025 – Val Acuña became the 54th player to reach 1,000 MPBL career points.
- July 30, 2025 – Michael Cañete became the 55th player to reach 1,000 MPBL career points.
- July 31, 2025 - Gabby Espinas became the 56th player to reach 1,000 MPBL career points.
- August 14, 2025 – Gab Dagangon became the 57th player to reach 1,000 MPBL career points.
- August 23, 2025 - Jan Jamon became the 58th player to reach 1,000 MPBL career points.
- September 1, 2025 - Encho Serrano became the 59th player to reach 1,000 MPBL career points.
- September 22, 2025 - Kenny Rocacurva became the 60th player to reach 1,000 MPBL career points.
- November 27, 2025 - Mike Ayonayon became the 61st player to reach 1,000 MPBL career points.

== Junior MPBL tournaments ==
The third season of the MPBL's youth league, the Junior MPBL, is expected to begin in April 2025.

== Media ==
This season was the first of a new television deal with Solar Entertainment Corporation, succeeding Cignal TV, which was the league's television partner from 2022 to 2024. Solar aired a selection of "over 200 games" on Mondays, Thursdays, and Saturdays on its Solar Sports channel throughout the season. The league continued to stream all games on its social media platforms.
