= Don Dulay =

Filipino basketball player

Rizal Golden Coolers
- Title: Head coach
- League: MPBL

Personal information
- Born: October 17, 1980 (age 46) Los Angeles, California, U.S.
- Listed height: 5 ft 8 in (1.73 m)
- Listed weight: 150 lb (68 kg)

Career information
- High school: Carson (Carson, California)
- College: El Camino College
- PBA draft: 2006: Undrafted
- Playing career: 2007–2013
- Position: Point guard
- Coaching career: 2017–present

Career history

Playing
- 2007–2010: Rain or Shine Elasto Painters
- 2011: Alaska Aces
- 2012–2013: Singapore Slingers

Coaching
- 2017–2018: Rain or Shine Elasto Painters (assistant)
- 2018–2021: Davao Occidental Tigers
- 2023: Makati OKBet Kings
- 2024–2025: Nueva Ecija Rice Vanguards / Capitals
- 2026–present: Rizal Golden Coolers

Career highlights
- MPBL champion (2021 Lakan)

Donald Isidro Merza Dulay (born October 17, 1980, in Los Angeles, California) is a Filipino-American former professional basketball player. He is currently serving as a head coach for the Rizal Golden Coolers of the Maharlika Pilipinas Basketball League (MPBL). He was an undrafted player but was later signed by Rain or Shine in 2007. He is also given the moniker "Double D" because of the D's in his first name and surname.

== Professional career ==
Born and raised in Los Angeles, California, Dulay was raised by Isidro and Filomena Dulay, who are both full-blooded Filipinos. He played basketball at Carson High School alongside Mike Cortez and Tony dela Cruz. He then moved to the Philippines to pursue a basketball career. Playing guard at 5’8″, he first declared for the PBA draft in 2005, but then withdrew his application. He then played for Cebuana Lhuillier and Welcoat Dragons in the Philippine Basketball League (PBL) before declaring for the 2006 PBA draft. Although no team drafted him, he was signed by the Welcoat Dragons as a free agent during the 2007–08 PBA season. In 2009, he contributed to Rain or Shine making its first PBA playoffs appearance and participated in the Three-Point Shootout during All-Star Week. In 2010, Rain or Shine released him. He then played for the Alaska Aces and the Singapore Slingers in the ABL.

== Coaching career ==
Dulay started as an assistant coach with Rain or Shine. In 2018, he became the head coach of the Davao Occidental Tigers of the MPBL. In 2019, they made the finals, but lost to the San Juan Knights. In 2020, he got to coach the South All-Stars during the All-Star Game. They advanced to the finals once again, and this time beat San Juan for the championship. He then left the team to return to the US.

In 2023, Dulay returned to coaching with the Makati OKBet Kings. In 2024, he then coached the Nueva Ecija Rice Vanguards. That year, they made it to the division semifinals. In 2025, they started the season 15–0. However, in the playoffs, they lost to the Pangasinan Heatwaves in the playoffs.

== PBA career statistics ==
Legend
GP	Games played	MPG	Minutes per game
FG%	Field-goal percentage	3P%	3-point field-goal percentage	FT%	Free-throw percentage
RPG	Rebounds per game	APG	Assists per game	SPG	Steals per game
BPG	Blocks per game	PPG	Points per game	**Bold**	Career high

=== Season-by-season averages ===
Year	Team	GP	MPG	FG%	3P%	FT%	RPG	APG	SPG	BPG	PPG
2007–08	Welcoat	33	13.9	.321	.256	.583	1.2	**2.0**	**.3**	.0	3.8
2008–09	Rain or Shine	**40**	**14.7**	.333	.328	.656	**1.4**	1.6	.2	.0	4.4
2009–10	Rain or Shine	16	10.1	**.403**	**.350**	**.733**	**1.4**	1.3	.2	.0	**4.7**
2010–11	Alaska	3	5.7	.000	.000	—	.0	.0	.0	.0	.0
Career		92	13.3	.335	.305	.639	1.3	1.6	.2	.0	4.1
