= Batangas City Athletics–Zamboanga Sikat rivalry =

Filipino basketball rivalry

Batangas City Tanduay Rum Masters–Zamboanga Sikat rivalry
- Teams: Batangas City Tanduay Rum Masters; Zamboanga Sikat (2019 onward); Zamboanga Valientes (2018)
- First meeting: November 27, 2018 (MPBL); Batangas City 104, Zamboanga Valientes 93
- Latest meeting: August 4, 2026 (MPBL); Batangas City 72, Zamboanga 62

Statistics
- Total meetings: 20
- All-time series: Batangas City 12–8 Zamboanga
- Longest win streak: Batangas City / Zamboanga W3
- Current win streak: Batangas City W2

Postseason history
- 2019 MPBL South Division semifinals: Batangas City won, 2–1; 2020 MPBL South Division quarterfinals: Zamboanga won, 2–1; 2022 MPBL South Division finals: Zamboanga won, 2–1; 2025 MPBL South Division quarterfinals: Batangas City won, 2–1

The Batangas City Athletics and Zamboanga Sikat have consistently fought for contention in the South Division of the Maharlika Pilipinas Basketball League, finishing in the top six across all seasons in the league. From 2019 to 2022, both teams met in the playoffs in three consecutive seasons, all of their match-ups going the full three games, culminating in a division finals series in 2022. The rivalry previously featured the Zamboanga Valientes, the predecessor to the current Zamboanga franchise, as they first met Batangas City during their first meeting in 2018.

As of August 4, 2026, Batangas City currently leads the all-time series, 12–8.

== History ==
=== 2018: First meeting ===
The first meeting between the two teams first happened on November 27, 2018, at Batangas City Coliseum. The home team Batangas City Athletics won the game against Zamboanga (who were then under the Zamboanga Valientes banner) with a score of 104–93.

=== 2019–2022: Playoff contention ===
The two teams first met in the playoffs in 2019. Despite being the sixth seed and having a losing record in the regular season, the now-Zamboanga Family's Brand Sardines won game 1 of the series. However, they weren't able to complete the upset, as Batangas City won the next two games at home to advance to the division finals. They then met again in 2020, this time in the division quarterfinals. Once again, both teams tied the series after two games, but this time around, it was Zamboanga who came away with the win. As of 2023, it marked the only time in which Batangas City was eliminated before the last two rounds of the playoffs.

In 2022, both Batangas City and Zamboanga took up the top two positions in the South Division, setting up a potential South Division finals series. Both teams were able to reach the penultimate round. Game 1 of the series was held at the Mayor Vitaliano D. Agan Coliseum, making it the first game in which Zamboanga was the home team. Batangas City were able to win, 80–71. Zamboanga then tied the series in Batangas City's home grounds with a 63–53 victory of their own, forcing a game 3 in Zamboanga City. In game 3, Batangas City led by as much as 19 points, but Zamboanga were able to close the gap throughout the fourth quarter. Within the last minute, Jaycee Marcelino successfully made a shot that gave Zamboanga their first lead in the game with 40 seconds remaining. Zamboanga were able to hold on to clinch the South Division crown.

=== 2023–2024: Cooldown period ===
After their 2022 South Division finals series, they haven't met again in the playoffs for two years, only played in the regular season. In 2024, both teams tied in regular season record for the first time.

=== 2025: Playoff contention ===
For the first time in three years, Batangas City and Zamboanga met again in the playoffs, this time in the first round, with Batangas City finishing second with a 20–9 record while Zamboanga clinched seventh with a 17–12 record. Game 1 of the series was held at the Batangas City Coliseum with the home team drawing first blood of the series, 70–61. Zamboanga was able to tie the series in a neutral ground at the Ynares Center Montalban, 78–72. Game 3 was held at a new venue in Batangas City in Batangas Province Events Center. Zamboanga led as much as 14 points before Batangas City erased the deficit to win the series, 95–87.

== Annual finishes ==
NOTE: Preseason games are not included.

League	Season	Batangas City Athletics/Embassy Chill/Tanduay Rum Masters				Zamboanga Family's Brand Sardines/Master Sardines/Sikat				Series
League	Season	W	L	PCT	Playoff finish	W	L	PCT	Playoff finish	Series
MPBL	2018–19	15	10	.600	Lost division finals	12	13	.480	Lost division semifinals	BTG 3–1
MPBL	2019–20	19	11	.633	Lost division quarterfinals	18	12	.600	Lost division semifinals	2–2
FilBasket	Summer 2022	11	0	1.000	Lost semifinals	5	6	.455	Did not qualify	BTG 1–0
MPBL	2022	17	4	.810	lost division finals	18	3	.857	Lost national finals	2–2
MPBL	2023	22	6	.786	lost division finals	20	8	.714	Lost division semifinals	ZAM 1–0
MPBL	2024	20	8	.714	lost division finals	20	8	.714	Lost division quarterfinals	BTG 1–0
MPBL	2025	20	9	.690	lost division semifinals	17	12	.586	lost division quarterfinals	2–2

== Game summaries ==
Legend
Batangas City win
Zamboanga win
**Bold** indicates home team

League	Type	Date	Winning team	Score	Losing team	Location	Recap
MPBL	Regular season	November 27, 2018	**Batangas City**	104–93	Zamboanga Valientes	Batangas City Coliseum	Recap
MPBL	Playoffs	March 27, 2019	Zamboanga	72–58	Batangas City	Rizal Memorial Colleges	Recap
MPBL	Playoffs	March 30, 2019	**Batangas City**	67–57	Zamboanga	Batangas City Coliseum	Recap
MPBL	Playoffs	April 2, 2019	**Batangas City**	80–72	Zamboanga	Batangas City Coliseum	Recap
MPBL	Regular season	August 26, 2019	Batangas City	77–67	Zamboanga	San Andres Sports Complex	Recap
MPBL	Playoffs	February 17, 2020	Zamboanga	78–74	Batangas City	Davao City Recreation Center	Recap
MPBL	Playoffs	February 21, 2020	**Batangas City**	84–75	Zamboanga	Batangas City Coliseum	Recap
MPBL	Playoffs	February 26, 2020	Zamboanga	69–52	**Batangas City**	Batangas City Coliseum	Recap
FilBasket	Regular season	April 20, 2022	Batangas City	72–71	Zamboanga	San Jose del Monte Sports Complex	Recap
MPBL	Regular season	August 1, 2022	**Batangas City**	87–83	Zamboanga	Batangas City Coliseum	Recap
MPBL	Playoffs	November 19, 2022	Batangas City	80–71	**Zamboanga**	Mayor Vitaliano D. Agan Coliseum	Recap
MPBL	Playoffs	November 22, 2022	Zamboanga	63–53	**Batangas City**	Batangas City Coliseum	Recap
MPBL	Playoffs	November 26, 2022	**Zamboanga**	67–66	Batangas City	Mayor Vitaliano D. Agan Coliseum	Recap
MPBL	Regular season	April 25, 2023	Zamboanga	81–74	Batangas City	Cuneta Astrodome	Recap
MPBL	Regular season	August 10, 2024	Batangas City	93–80	Zamboanga	Nueva Ecija Coliseum	Recap
MPBL	Regular season	June 6, 2025	Zamboanga	87–82	Batangas City	Bren Z. Guiao Convention Center	Recap
MPBL	Playoffs	October 16, 2025	**Batangas City**	70–61	Zamboanga	Batangas City Coliseum	Recap
MPBL	Playoffs	October 23, 2025	Zamboanga	78–72	Batangas City	Ynares Center II	Recap
MPBL	Playoffs	October 30, 2025	**Batangas City**	95–87	Zamboanga	Batangas Province Events Center	Recap
MPBL	Regular season	August 4, 2026	Batangas City	72–62	Zamboanga	Ynares Center II	Recap
