= Gabby Espinas =

Filipino basketball player (born 1982)

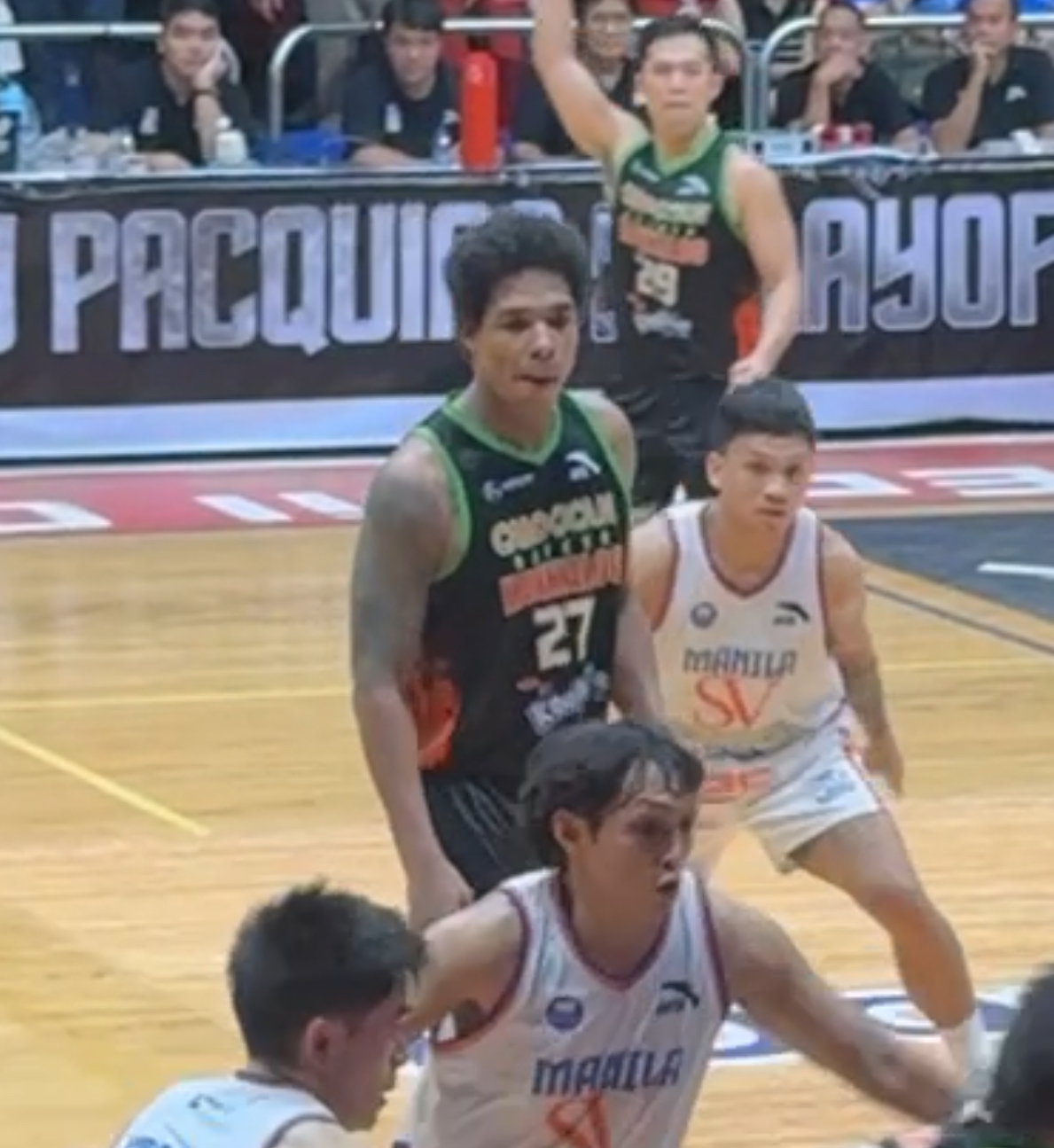
- Espinas (middle) with the Caloocan Batang Kankaloo in 2024

Personal information
- Born: January 3, 1982 (age 44) Olongapo, Philippines
- Listed height: 6 ft 4 in (1.93 m)
- Listed weight: 208 lb (94 kg)

Career information
- College: PCU
- PBA draft: 2006: 1st round, 5th overall pick
- Drafted by: San Miguel Beermen
- Playing career: 2006–present
- Position: Power forward

Career history

Playing
- 2006–2007: San Miguel Beermen
- 2007–2008: Air21 Express
- 2008–2009: Barako Bull Energy Boosters
- 2009–2010: Sta. Lucia Realtors
- 2010–2012: Meralco Bolts
- 2012–2015: Alaska Aces
- 2015: GlobalPort Batang Pier
- 2015–2018: San Miguel Beermen
- 2018–2019: NorthPort Batang Pier
- 2019: Meralco Bolts
- 2019–2020: Manila Stars
- 2021: JPS Zamboanga City
- 2021: Sarangani Marlins
- 2022: Ormoc – OCCCI Sheer Masters
- 2022: Sarangani Marlins
- 2022–2025: Caloocan Batang Kankaloo / Supremos

Coaching
- 2024–2025: Caloocan Supremos

Career highlights
- 6× PBA champion (2013 Commissioner's, 2015 Governors', 2015–16 Philippine, 2016–17 Philippine, 2017 Commissioner's, 2017–18 Philippine); PBA All-Star (2009); PSL champion (2025); All-PSL Super Five (2023); NCAA Philippines Most Valuable Player (2004); NCAA Philippines Rookie of the Year (2004)

Gabriel Espinas (born January 3, 1982) is a Filipino professional basketball former player and former head coach for the Caloocan Batang Kankaloo franchise of the Maharlika Pilipinas Basketball League (MPBL) and Pilipinas Super League (PSL). A 6'4" forward, he was drafted fifth overall by the San Miguel Beermen in the 2006 PBA draft. He made a name in the amateur ranks as the first-ever Rookie of the Year-Most Valuable Player of the NCAA while playing for the PCU Dolphins.

== Amateur career ==
Espinas began to play for PCU in the NCAA in the 2004 season. With Espinas, Robert Sanz, Jayson Castro, and Ian Garrido playing together with head coach Loreto Tolentino, the Dolphins made it to the Final Four for the first time since 2002.

After defeating the defending champion Letran Knights, PCU defeated the UPHSD Altas in the finals with Espinas scoring double-double numbers in the Final Four and the championship series.

He became the first NCAA player to be named as the Rookie of the Year and the Most Valuable Player in the same season. San Beda's Sam Ekwe followed suit in the 2006 season.

From 2005 to 2006, he led the Dolphins to the finals only to lose to Letran and San Beda, respectively. However, he was still named to the Mythical Five in both seasons.

He debuted in the Philippine Basketball League in 2005 for the Harbour Centre Portmasters playing alongside Mark Cardona, LA Tenorio, Magnum Membrere, and PCU teammates Castro and Sanz.

After a stint with Harbour, he played his final two conferences with the Hapee-PCU squad, leading them to the semifinals in the Heroes Cup.

== Professional career ==
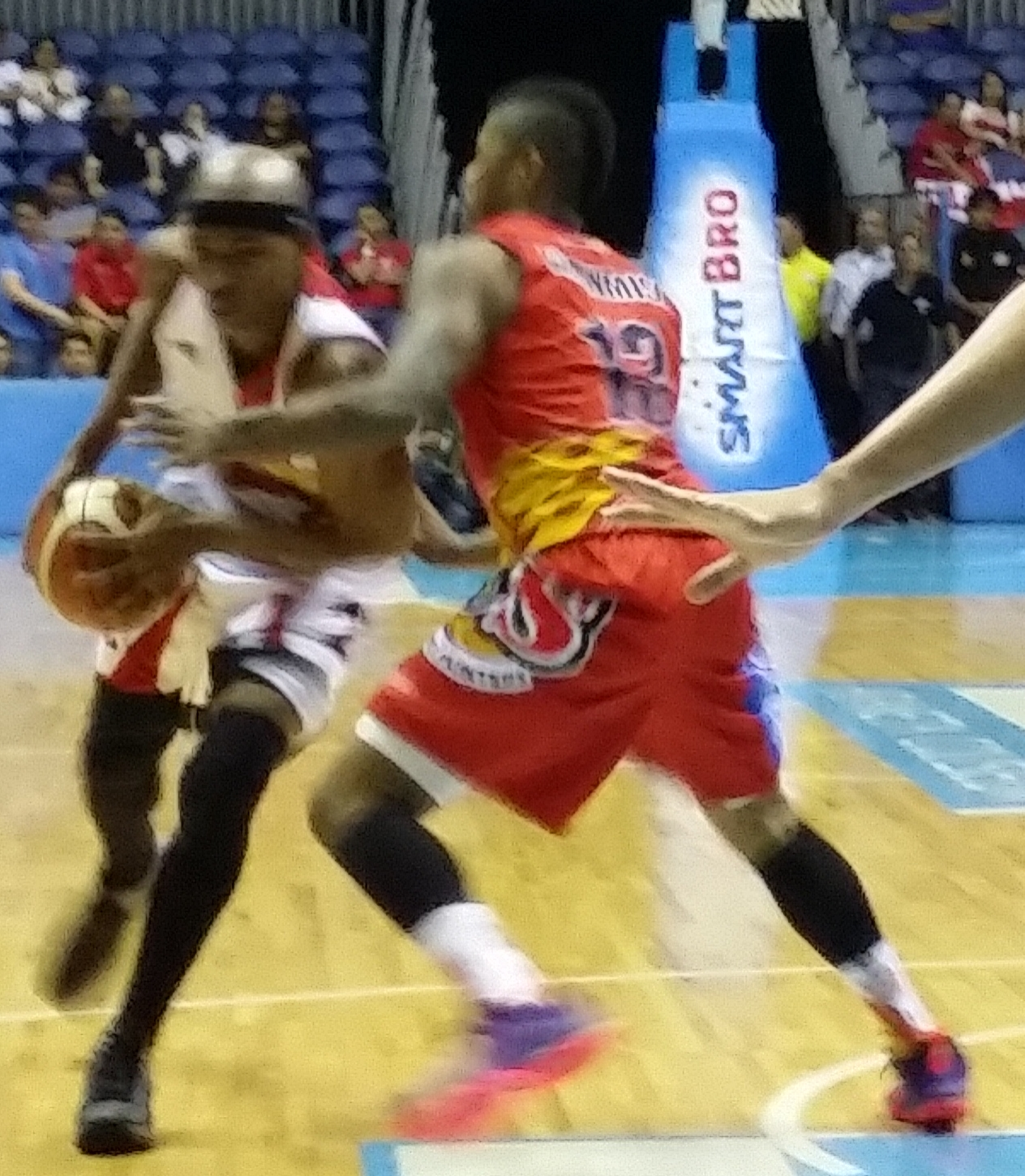
Espinas with the San Miguel Beermen in 2016

In the 2006 PBA Draft, Espinas was drafted fifth overall by the San Miguel Beermen. After his time with PCU, he was quickly signed by San Miguel to a rookie contract. He made his PBA debut in a game against Red Bull and played an impressive performance despite the loss.

He then played the reserve role for the Beermen after the team acquired the services of Rommel Adducul and Lordy Tugade plus the return from injury of Danny Ildefonso.

The San Miguel Beermen traded Espinas for the Air21 Express' first-round pick in the 2008 PBA draft.

He was then traded by the Air21 Express to the Red Bull Barako for a first-round pick in the 2009 PBA Draft. The pick was then used to draft Japeth Aguilar as the first overall in 2009 by the Whoopers.

In 2009, he was again traded to the Sta. Lucia Realtors, his fourth team, for Sta. Lucia's 2009 first-round pick.

In 2012, he was traded to the Alaska Aces in exchange for Jay-R Reyes.

On March 14, 2015, he was traded to GlobalPort Batang Pier in exchange for Nonoy Baclao and a 2017 first-round draft pick.

On April 6, 2015, Espinas was traded back to the Beermen as part of a 4-team, 6-player trade.

== PBA career statistics ==
Legend
GP	Games played	MPG	Minutes per game
FG%	Field-goal percentage	3P%	3-point field-goal percentage	FT%	Free-throw percentage
RPG	Rebounds per game	APG	Assists per game	SPG	Steals per game
BPG	Blocks per game	PPG	Points per game	**Bold**	Career high

Correct as of October 4, 2016

=== Season-by-season averages ===
Year	Team	GP	MPG	FG%	3P%	FT%	RPG	APG	SPG	BPG	PPG
2006–07	San Miguel	47	9.9	.519	.000	.582	2.9	.4	.2	.3	3.6
2007–08	Magnolia / Air21	20	9.2	.412	.143	.643	1.7	.3	.2	.2	2.6
2008–09	Red Bull / Barako Bull	33	27.9	.482	.212	.634	8.4	**1.2**	**.4**	.5	**12.4**
2009–10	Sta. Lucia	37	20.3	.516	.000	.616	5.3	.7	.2	.4	7.2
2010–11	Meralco	32	**31.1**	.487	.000	**.691**	**8.6**	**1.2**	**.4**	**.7**	12.1
2011–12	Meralco	34	27.8	.465	**.500**	.643	6.8	.9	**.4**	.6	11.2
2012–13	Alaska	**54**	17.6	.515	.000	.673	4.0	.6	.1	.3	7.5
2013–14	Alaska	43	24.5	.538	.000	.628	6.7	1.1	**.4**	.2	10.2
2014–15	Alaska / GlobalPort / San Miguel	32	11.8	**.573**	.000	.620	2.3	.4	.2	.1	3.7
2015–16	San Miguel	47	14.3	.540	**.500**	.689	3.4	.5	.2	.2	5.4
Career		379	19.3	.504	.220	.646	5.0	.7	.3	.3	7.6

== Personal life ==
Espinas was born to an African-American father, who was once stationed in Subic but died when Gabby was only five years old, and to a Filipina mother.
