= Michael Calisaan =

Filipino basketball player

No. 2 – San Juan Knights
- Position: Power forward / small forward
- League: MPBL

Personal information
- Born: February 27, 1995 (age 31) Pampanga, Philippines
- Listed height: 6 ft 4 in (1.93 m)

Career information
- College: San Sebastian
- PBA draft: 2018: 1st round, 10th overall pick
- Drafted by: Magnolia Hotshots
- Playing career: 2019–present

Career history
- 2019–2020: Magnolia Hotshots
- 2021: Phoenix Super LPG Fuel Masters
- 2022–present: San Juan Knights / Kings

Career highlights
- PSL Most Valuable Player (2025); PSL Mythical Five (2025)

Michael Calisaan is a Filipino professional basketball player for the San Juan Knights of the Maharlika Pilipinas Basketball League (MPBL). He was selected 10th overall in the 2018 PBA draft by Magnolia Hotshots.

== Professional career ==
=== Magnolia Hotshots (2018–2020) ===
On December 16, 2018, Calisaan was selected with the tenth overall by the Magnolia Hotshots in the 2018 PBA draft.

== PBA career statistics ==
Legend
GP	Games played	MPG	Minutes per game
FG%	Field-goal percentage	3P%	3-point field-goal percentage	FT%	Free-throw percentage
RPG	Rebounds per game	APG	Assists per game	SPG	Steals per game
BPG	Blocks per game	PPG	Points per game	**Bold**	Career high

As of the end of 2021 season

=== Season-by-season averages ===
Year	Team	GP	MPG	FG%	3P%	FT%	RPG	APG	SPG	BPG	PPG
2019	Magnolia	7	4.8	**.556**	.200	**.167**	1.6	.0	.0	.0	**3.1**
2020	Magnolia	**9**	6.2	.385	.000	.000	**1.7**	**.2**	.0	.0	1.1
2021	Phoenix Super LPG	**9**	**7.4**	.286	**.250**	.000	1.6	**.2**	.0	.0	1.6
Career		25	6.2	.404	.214	.100	1.6	.2	.0	.0	1.9
