= Caloocan Batang Kankaloo =

Professional basketball team in the Philippines

- 2026 Caloocan Batang Kankaloo season
- League: MPBL (2018–present); PSL (2022–2025)
- Founded: 2017; 9 years ago
- History: Caloocan Supremos; 2017–2021 (MPBL); 2023–2025 (PSL); Caloocan Excellence; 2021–2022; Caloocan Batang Kankaloo; 2022–2023 (PSL); 2023–present (MPBL)
- Arena: Caloocan Sports Complex
- Location: Caloocan
- Team colors
- Main sponsor: Victory Liner
- Head coach: Jerson Cabiltes
- Championships: PSL: 1 (2025)

The Caloocan Batang Kankaloo (also known as Caloocan Batang Kankaloo-Victory Liner for sponsorship reasons) are a Filipino professional basketball team based in Caloocan. The team competes in the Maharlika Pilipinas Basketball League (MPBL) as a member of the league's North Division. The team plays its home games at Caloocan Sports Complex, located on the northern portion of the city.

The team began play in the 2018 MPBL season as one of the MPBL's charter teams. They also compete in the Pilipinas Super League (PSL) and currently go by the Caloocan Supremos, the team's original name.

The Caloocan franchise is one of two teams based in the Northern Manila District of Metro Manila, the other being the Valenzuela City Darkhorse. Since its founding, the team is owned by the City Government of Caloocan.

== History ==
=== Maharlika Pilipinas Basketball League ===
In 2017, the Caloocan Supremos joined the Maharlika Pilipinas Basketball League as one of the ten charter teams for its inaugural season. The team played in the league's inaugural game against the Parañaque Patriots, but lost, 60–70. The team only won one game in their inaugural season, giving them the worst record that season.

In the 2018–19 season, despite finishing with a losing record, Caloocan was tied with the Pampanga Lanterns for the final playoff spot, which Caloocan would clinch because of their victory in the teams' head-to-head matchup. The team was then swept in the First Round by the first-seeded Bataan Risers. In the 2019–20 season, even though the team finished with a winning record, they only finished ninth in the Northern Division.

For the 2021 Invitational, the team changed their name to the Caloocan Excellence. In the following 2022 season, Caloocan would once again fall short, finishing ninth in the Northern Division.

In 2023, the veteran-led Caloocan squad managed to finish with the team's best record thus far, a 20–8 record, and clinched top four in its division for the first time. Despite a massive improvement from the previous season, none of its players were selected for that season's All-Star Game. In the First Round, the team had a tough matchup against Pasig City MCW Sports, but made it through in a close series that went to game 3. Unfortunately, they would go on to be swept by the Pampanga Giant Lanterns in the Division Semifinals.

=== Pilipinas Super League ===
In 2022, the team joined the Pilipinas Super League for the 2022–23 DUMPER Cup, and subsequently changed its name to the Batang Kankaloo. Batang Kankaloo would also be used as the name of its under-18 team. The team tied for the fourth-best record alongside the Pampanga G Lanterns and Santa Rosa, but settled for the sixth-seed. In the playoffs, the Batang Kankaloo lost to the Pampanga Royce in the Quarterfinals.

During the 2023–24 MPBL off-season, the team returned to the PSL, this time going by its original name, the Caloocan Supremos.

== Team identity ==
From 2018 until 2020, the Caloocan Supremos used an orange and blue color scheme. The logo showed a graphic of the Bonifacio Monument on top of a basketball. An outline of a Victory Liner bus, the team's sponsor at the time, is also shown.

In 2021, upon renaming to the Caloocan Excellence, blue was replaced with green, forming an orange and green color scheme. The logo was a simple text with the team name, but with the Bonifacio Monument replacing the "L" in Caloocan. The simple text logo would carry over with the name change to Batang Kankaloo in 2022.

In 2023, during the team's second PSL stint, the team returned to the original Supremos name, now with the orange and green color scheme.

== Home venues ==
The only venue the Caloocan franchise played in was the Caloocan Sports Complex, located on the city's north side.

Venue	Location	2018	2018–19	2019–20	2022	2023	2024	2025	2026
Caloocan Sports Complex	Caloocan	✓	✓	✓	✓	✓	✓	✓	✓

== Current roster ==
Caloocan Batang Kankaloo roster
Players

Pos.	No.	Name	Height	Weight	DOB	From
G	0	Kean Baclaan	5 ft 7 in (1.70 m)		2003–01–02	De La Salle
F	1	Rommel Calahat	6 ft 2 in (1.88 m)		1998–12–25	San Sebastian
F/C	2	Jammer Jamito	6 ft 5 in (1.96 m)	170 lb (77 kg)	1990–09–01	St. Clare
G/F	3	Jhygruz Vence Laude	6 ft 1 in (1.85 m)		1989–10–29	Lyceum
F	4	Kymani Ladi (FF)	6 ft 8 in (2.03 m)		2000–09–13	Ateneo
F/C	5	Ronnie Matias	6 ft 4 in (1.93 m)	180 lb (82 kg)	1983–11–29	Manila
G	7	Jeramer Cabanag	6 ft 0 in (1.83 m)		1993–08–07	San Beda
G	9	Jielo Razon	5 ft 11 in (1.80 m)		1999–06–09	UPHSD
G	12	Kris Harvey Pagsanjan	6 ft 1 in (1.85 m)		1999-01-02	Emilio Aguinaldo
F	13	Eric Camson	6 ft 4 in (1.93 m)	228 lb (103 kg)	1990–06–12	Adamson
F	14	Nhomer Gonzales	6 ft 3 in (1.91 m)		1997–09–11	Letran
G	16	Irven Palencia (HG)	5 ft 8 in (1.73 m)		1996–12–16	St. Clare
F	18	Antonio Bonsubre Jr.	6 ft 4 in (1.93 m)		1993–10–26	San Beda
G/F	19	Paul Hendrix Casin (HG)	6 ft 3 in (1.91 m)		1996–07–13
G/F	24	Dominic Escobar (FF)	6 ft 5 in (1.96 m)		2002–02–06	Ateneo
G	27	Chris Bitoon	5 ft 9 in (1.75 m)		1994–10–15	St. Clare
G	29	Joco Tayongtong	5 ft 9 in (1.75 m)		1994–03–31	Emilio Aguinaldo
G	30	Jeff Manday	6 ft 0 in (1.83 m)	177 lb (80 kg)	1995–03–29	CSAV
G	31	Jayjay Manlangit (HG)	6 ft 1 in (1.85 m)		1993–08–31	Centro Escolar

Coaches

Head coach

- Jerson Cabiltes

Assistant coach(es)

- Noy Catalan
- Harold Ng
- Bong Pineda
- Joseph Guion
- Ariel Sison
- Dands Javier
- Jun Medina
- Ric Sison

Legend

- (HG) Homegrown
- (FF) Filipino-foreigner
- (EA) EASL player
- (RS) Reserve player
- (S) Suspended
- Injured

- Roster – Genius Sports
Updated as of: April 26, 2026

=== Head coaches ===
Caloocan Batang Kankaloo head coaches
#	Name	Start	End	Achievements	Ref.
1	John Kallos	2018	2020	—	
2	Rene Baena	2021	2022	—	
3	Ronnie Dojillo	2022	2023	—	
4	Robert Sison	2023	2023	—	
5	Alexander Angeles	2024	2024	—	
6	Gabby Espinas	2025	2025	—	
7	Michael Saguiguit	2025	2025	—	
8	Jerson Cabiltes	2026	current	—	

== Notable players ==
=== Individual award winners ===
MPBL Defensive Player of the Year

- Antonio Bonsubre Jr. – 2025

MPBL Homegrown Player of the Year

- Prince Casin – 2025

PSL Mythical Team

- Gabby Espinas – 2023

=== All-Stars ===
MPBL All-Star selections

- Almond Vosotros – 2019
- Paul Sanga – 2020, 2024
- Damian Lasco – 2022
- Jeff Manday – 2025

PSL All-Star selections

- Gabby Espinas – 2023
- John Marco Tayongtong – 2023

=== PBA players ===
Ex-PBA players

- Mac Baracael
- Philip Butel
- Eric Camson
- JR Cawaling
- Reil Cervantes
- Gabby Espinas
- Jammer Jamito
- A. J. Mandani
- Ronnie Matias
- Jielo Razon
- Dennice Villamor
- Almond Vosotros (returned to PBA)

== Season-by-season records ==
=== Maharlika Pilipinas Basketball League ===
Note: Statistics are correct as of the end of the 2026 MPBL season.

League champions
Division champions
Qualified for playoffs
Best regular season record

Season	League	Division	Regular season						Playoffs	
Season	League	Division	Finish	Played	Wins	Losses	Win %	GB	Round	Results
Caloocan Supremos
2018; Rajah Cup	MPBL	—	10th	9	1	8	.111	7	Did not qualify	
2018–19; Datu Cup	MPBL	North	8th	25	11	14	.440	12	Division quarterfinals	lost vs. Bataan, 0–2
2019–20; Lakan Season	MPBL	North	9th	30	16	14	.533	10	Did not qualify	
Caloocan Excellence
2022	MPBL	North	9th	21	6	15	.286	15	Did not qualify	
Caloocan Batang Kankaloo
2023	MPBL	North	4th	28	20	8	.714	6	Division quarterfinals Division semifinals	won vs. Pasig City, 2–1 lost vs. Pampanga, 0–2
2024	MPBL	North	5th	28	19	9	.679	7	Division quarterfinals Division semifinals	won vs. Manila, 2–0 lost vs. San Juan, 0–2
2025	MPBL	North	4th	29	21	8	.724	7	Division quarterfinals Division semifinals	won vs. Pampanga, 2–0 lost vs. Abra, 0–2
2026	MPBL	North	3rd	25	20	5	.800	3	Division quarterfinals Division semifinals	won vs. Ilagan Isabela, 2–0 lost vs. San Juan, 0–2
Regular season record				195	114	81	.585		5 playoff appearances	
Playoff record				19	8	11	.421		0 finals appearances	
Overall record				214	122	92	.570		0 championships	

=== Pilipinas Super League ===
Note: Statistics are correct as of the end of the 2024–25 Pilipinas Super League season.

PSL champions	PSL runners-up	Playoff berth

Season	League	Regular season						Playoffs	
Season	League	Finish	Played	Wins	Losses	Win %	GB	Round	Results
Batang Kankaloo Koolers
2022–23	PSL	6th	15	10	5	.667	5	Quarterfinals	lost vs. Pam. Royce, 77–91
Caloocan Supremos
2023–24	PSL	4th	18	14	4	.778	3	First round Quarterfinals	won vs. Indanan, 115–69 lost vs. Quezon, 0–2
2024–25	PSL	1st	10	9	1	.900	—	Semifinals; Finals	won vs. Pangasinan, 2–1 won vs. San Juan, 2–1
Regular season record				43	33	10	.767		3 playoff appearances
Playoff record				10	5	5	.500		1 finals appearance
Cumulative record				53	38	15	.717		1 championship

=== Combined ===
Note: Statistics are correct as of the end of the 2024–25 Pilipinas Super League season.

Statistic	Played	Wins	Losses	Win %
MPBL regular season record	141	73	68	.518
PSL regular season record	43	33	10	.767
All-time regular season record	184	106	78	.576
MPBL playoff record	11	4	7	.364
PSL playoff record	10	5	5	.500
All-time playoff record	21	9	12	.429
All-time cumulative record	205	115	90	.561
