= Rizal Golden Coolers =

Professional basketball team in Rizal, Philippines

- 2026 Rizal Golden Coolers season
- League: MPBL
- Founded: 2018; 8 years ago
- History: Rizal Crusaders; 2018–2019; Rizal Golden Coolers; 2019–present
- Arena: Ynares Center Antipolo; Ynares Center Montalban; One Arena
- Location: Rizal
- Team colors
- Main sponsor: PTC Foodsphere Asia Corp. AMRC Holdings Company, Inc. EMKAI Non-Specialized Wholesale Trading
- Head coach: Don Dulay

The Rizal Golden Coolers (also known as the Rizal Golden Coolers-Xentromall for sponsorship reasons) are a Filipino professional basketball team based in the province of Rizal. The team competes in the Maharlika Pilipinas Basketball League (MPBL) as a member of the league's South Division. The team have its home games in Ynares Center Montalban.

The Rizal franchise began play during the 2018–19 season as the Rizal Crusaders. Team ownership said that the name was chosen as the province of Rizal is known for "crusades, mountaineering, and other stuff". Originally, the team was going to be called the Rizal Ankle Breakers, but was changed due to criticism that the name didn't have any relation to the province of Rizal.

The Golden Coolers are one of five teams based in Calabarzon.

== History ==
Logo of the Rizal Golden Coolers used during the 2022 season.

Rizal struggled during its first two seasons, ending up with the worst record of the division in both instances. In the 2018–19 season, the team finished 7–18, last place in the Southern Division. In the 2019–20 season, the team finished 7-22, last place in the Northern Division.

Despite struggling in the 2021 Invitational, with a record of 1–4, the team rose up in the 2022 season. The Golden Coolers finished the season 10–11, earning a playoff appearance for the first time. As the sixth seed, they upset the third-seed Sarangani in the First Round, but would go on to be swept by Batangas City in the Division Semifinals,

== Home arenas ==
The Rizal-based team's main arena is the Ynares Center Montalban, located in Montalban

== Current roster ==
Rizal Golden Coolers roster
Players

Pos.	No.	Name	Height	Weight	DOB	From
G	1	Laurenz Paul Victoria	5 ft 11 in (1.80 m)		1996–09–08	Mapúa
G	2	Felipe Chavez	6 ft 8 in (2.03 m)
G	3	Keanu Caballero	5 ft 5 in (1.65 m)		1995–12–15	Centro Escolar
G	4	Jolo Mendoza	5 ft 10 in (1.78 m)		1998–01–31	Ateneo
G	5	Jonix Rosales	5 ft 10 in (1.78 m)			OLFU
G	7	CJ Arboleda (HG)	5 ft 7 in (1.70 m)
G/F	9	AJ Coronel	6 ft 2 in (1.88 m)		1997–03–14	UPHSD
G	10	Billy Robles	6 ft 0 in (1.83 m)	175 lb (79 kg)	1992–05–30	NIPSC
F	11	John Paul Maguliano	6 ft 4 in (1.93 m)		1998–11–28	Emilio Aguinaldo
G	14	Ryann Louis Panganiban (HG)	5 ft 11 in (1.80 m)
G	15	Bonbon Batiller	6 ft 0 in (1.83 m)		1994–04–23	Letran
G	17	Alwyn Alday	5 ft 11 in (1.80 m)		1990–04–18	LCCM
G	18	Philip Manalang	5 ft 10 in (1.78 m)		1997–03–01	UE
F	19	John Paul Sarao	6 ft 3 in (1.91 m)	220 lb (100 kg)	1995–02–23	Saint Francis of Assisi
G	20	Joel Lee Yu (HG)	5 ft 10 in (1.78 m)			Far Eastern
F	24	Jake Gaspay	6 ft 4 in (1.93 m)		2001–07–15	St. Benilde
F	26	Lervin Flores	6 ft 5 in (1.96 m)	185 lb (84 kg)	1992–09–26	Arellano
F	28	Marco Balagtas	6 ft 3 in (1.91 m)		1994–09–17	José Rizal
G	29	Jerro Adam Zaldivar (HG)	5 ft 4 in (1.63 m)
G/F	42	John Aviso	6 ft 3 in (1.91 m)		1999–02–10	Columbia Bible College
F/C	83	Mark Yee	6 ft 3 in (1.91 m)	170 lb (77 kg)	1982–01–04	San Sebastian (Cavite)

Coaches

Head coach

- Don Dulay

Assistant coach(es)

- Jonathan Uyloan
- Rey Paul Javier
- Rob Wainwright

Team manager

- Kyle Cruz

Legend

- (HG) Homegrown
- (FF) Filipino-foreigner
- (EA) EASL player
- (RS) Reserve player
- (S) Suspended
- Injured

- Roster – via Genius Sports
Updated as of: June 22, 2026

=== Head coaches ===
Rizal Golden Coolers head coaches
#	Name	Start	End	Achievements	Ref.
1	Braulio Lim Jr.	2018–19	2018–19	—	
2	Jayvee Gayoso	2019–20	2019–20	—	
3	Rodney Santos	2021	2021	—	
4	Jonathan Banal	2022	2023	—	
5	Ralph Emerson Rivera	2024	2025	—	
6	Mark Dandan	2026	2026	—	
7	Don Dulay	2026	present	—	

== Notable players ==
=== Individual award winners ===
All-MPBL Second Team

- Eric Camson – 2025

=== MPBL All-Star Day ===
All-Star selections

- Marco Balagtas – 2019
- Mark Benitez – 2020
- Troy Mallillin – 2022, 2023
- Jboy Gob – 2023
- Eric Camson – 2025

=== PBA players ===
Ex-PBA players

- Chad Alonzo
- Philip Butel
- Philip Manalang
- Jolo Mendoza
- Billy Robles
- Mark Yee

== Season-by-season records ==
League champions
Division champions
Qualified for playoffs
Best regular season record

Season	Regular season							Playoffs	
Season	Division	Finish	GP	W	L	PCT	GB	Stage	Results
Rizal Crusaders
2018–19; Datu Cup	South	13th	25	7	18	.280	13	Did not qualify	
Rizal Golden Coolers
2019–20; Lakan Season	North	16th	29	6	23	.207	19.5	Did not qualify	
2022	South	6th	21	10	11	.476	8	Division quarterfinals Division Semifinals	won vs. Sarangani, 2–0 lost vs. Batangas City, 0–2
2023	North	10th	28	12	16	.429	14	Did not qualify	
2024	North	8th	28	15	13	.536	11	Division quarterfinals	lost vs. San Juan, 0–2
2025	South	3rd	29	19	10	.655	6	Division quarterfinals	lost vs. Biñan, 0–2
2026	South	6th	25	16	9	.640	5	Division quarterfinals Division semifinals	won vs. General Santos, 2–0; TBD vs. Biñan
All-time regular season record			185	85	100	.459		4 playoff appearances	
All-time playoff record			10	4	6	.400		0 Finals appearances	
All-time overall record			195	89	106	.456		0 championships	
