= Biñan Tatak Gel =

Professional basketball team in Laguna, Philippines

- 2026 Biñan Tatak Gel season
- League: MPBL (2018–present); PSL (2023–present); The Asian Tournament (2024–present)
- Founded: 2018; 8 years ago
- History: Laguna Heroes; 2018–2019, 2021–2022; Biñan City Heroes; 2019; Biñan City Luxxe White; 2019–2020; Laguna Krah Asia; 2023; Biñan Tatak Gel; 2023–present
- Arena: Alonte Sports Arena
- Location: Biñan, Laguna
- Team colors
- Main sponsor: Beast Motorcycle Tires; MegaWagi
- Head coach: Boyet Fernandez
- Ownership: Monching Talisayon; Gel Alonte

The Biñan Tatak Gel (also known as Biñan Tatak Gel–Beast Motorcycle Tires MegaWagi for sponsorship reasons) is a Filipino professional basketball team based in Biñan, Laguna. The team primarily competes in the Maharlika Pilipinas Basketball League (MPBL) as a member of the league's South Division. The team plays its home games at Alonte Sports Arena.

The team began play during the 2018–19 season as the Laguna Heroes. The team has also played in the Pilipinas Super League since 2023 as well as in The Asian Tournament since 2024.

The Laguna/Biñan franchise is tied with the Mindoro Tamaraws for the longest playoff drought in the MPBL, having missed the playoffs in its first four seasons before clinching a spot in 2024.

The Tatak Gel is one of five teams based in Calabarzon.

== History ==
=== 2018–2023: Original franchise ===
The Laguna Heroes joined the MPBL as one of sixteen expansion teams for the 2018–19 season. The team finished with a 10-15 record, finishing ninth in the South Division.

For the 2019–20 season, the team was renamed as the BIñan City Krah Heroes and later as Biñan City Luxxe White. The team finished in tenth with a 12-18 record, matching their winning percentage from last season.

Entering the 2021 Invitational, the team was renamed as Laguna Heroes Krah Asia, bringing back the team's old name. In the Invitational, the team lost in all of their group stage games. In the 2022 season, the team only won three of their 21 games, giving them the second-worst record in the division and third-worst in the league.

In 2023, the team was renamed to Laguna Krah Asia.

=== 2023: Current franchise ===
In November 2023, a new team under the name Biñan Tatak Gel joined the Pilipinas Super League during the 2023–24 President's Cup. The team is mainly composed of the former Imus SV Squad organization alongside members of the departing Pasig City MCW Sports team, including head coach Boyet Fernandez. With a 17–1 record, Biñan held the top seed that season. Despite making through the first two rounds, Biñan would eventually lose to the eventual champion Quezon Titans in the semifinals.

As the 2024 MPBL season began, the Tatak Gel team took over the Krah Asia's spot as Laguna's MPBL representatives.

== Team identity ==
The original name, Laguna Heroes, references the national hero of the Philippines, Jose Rizal, who was born in Calamba. Meanwhile their current name, Biñan Tatak Gel, is a name that is shared with multiple Biñan-based teams in the grassroots level, including its volleyball counterpart in the Maharlika Pilipinas Volleyball Association and its homegrown team in NBL–Pilipinas. The moniker itself is a nod to the city's incumbent mayor, Angelo "Gel" Alonte.

== Home venues ==
With the exception of 2022 and 2023, the Laguna franchise's primary venue has been the Alonte Sports Arena in Biñan. Other venues the team has used are the Santa Rosa Sports Complex in Santa Rosa and the Laguna Sports Complex in Santa Cruz.

Venue	Location	Capacity	2018–19	2019–20	2022	2023	2024	2025
Alonte Sports Arena	Biñan, Laguna	6,500	✓	✓	✗	✗	✓	✓
Santa Rosa Sports Complex	Santa Rosa, Laguna	5,700	✗	✓	✓	✓	✗	✗
Laguna Sports Complex	Santa Cruz, Laguna	2,500	✗	✗	✓	✓	✗	✗

== Current roster ==
Biñan Tatak Gel roster
Players

Pos.	No.	Name	Height	Weight	DOB	From
G	0	Pamboy Raymundo	5 ft 10 in (1.78 m)	170 lb (77 kg)	1989–05–30	San Sebastian
G	1	Renzo Subido	5 ft 9 in (1.75 m)	135 lb (61 kg)	1996–02–17	UST
G	2	John Barba (HG)	6 ft 2 in (1.88 m)			Lyceum
G	3	Nicael Dominie Cabañero	6 ft 3 in (1.91 m)			UST
F	4	Warren Bonifacio	6 ft 5 in (1.96 m)			Mapúa
G	5	Jeymark Mallari (HG)	5 ft 9 in (1.75 m)
G	7	Damian Lasco	6 ft 1 in (1.85 m)			NCBA
G	8	Bam Lopez	5 ft 10 in (1.78 m)		1999–07–09	St. Clare
G/F	10	Poypoy Actub	6 ft 0 in (1.83 m)
F/C	11	Kristian Hernandez	6 ft 6 in (1.98 m)		1998–07–11	SDCA
F	15	Marc Pingris	6 ft 4 in (1.93 m)	210 lb (95 kg)	1981–10–16	PSBA
C	18	Jason Ballesteros	6 ft 6 in (1.98 m)	220 lb (100 kg)	1985–10–07	San Sebastian
G	22	Carlo Lastimosa	5 ft 11 in (1.80 m)	182 lb (83 kg)	1990–09–03	St. Benilde
G	24	Jonah Jacob	5 ft 10 in (1.78 m)		1994–04–12
F/C	28	Michael Mabulac (HG)	6 ft 4 in (1.93 m)	218 lb (99 kg)	1991–10–31	José Rizal
F	29	Jopet Soriano	6 ft 4 in (1.93 m)			Mapúa
F	31	Jaymar Gimpayan	6 ft 2 in (1.88 m)			Lyceum
G	44	Ryan Sual (HG)	5 ft 10 in (1.78 m)			St. Clare
G	77	Jeric James Pido	5 ft 10 in (1.78 m)			Mapúa
G	88	Kenny Rocacurva	6 ft 2 in (1.88 m)			Letran
G	95	Michael Joseph Homo (HG)	5 ft 8 in (1.73 m)			UPHSL

Coaches

Head coach

- Boyet Fernandez

Assistant coach(es)

- Gyno Manuel
- Jinino Manansala
- Eleazar Cabutotan
- JR Manansala
- Mac Cardona
- Patrick Gabriel Añonuevo
- KG Canaleta

Team manager

- Jhon Ray Gañola

Legend

- (HG) Homegrown
- (FF) Filipino-foreigner
- (EA) EASL player
- (RS) Reserve player
- (S) Suspended
- Injured

- Roster via Genius Sports
Updated as of: April 10, 2026

=== Head coaches ===
Biñan Tatak Gel head coaches
#	Name	Start	End	Achievements	Ref.
1	Alexander Angeles	2018	2018	—	
2	Nath Gregorio	2018–19	2018–19	—	
3	Alexander Angeles	2019	2019	—	
4	Denok Miranda	2019–20	2019–20	—	
5	Victor Escudero	2021	2021	—	
5	Nath Gregorio	2022	2023	—	
6	Boyet Fernandez	2024	current	—	

== Notable players ==
=== Individual award winners ===
All-MPBL Second Team

- Michael Mabulac – 2019

=== MPBL All-Star Day ===
All-Star selections

- Michael Mabulac – 2019
- Allan Mangahas – 2020
- Paolo Pontejos – 2022
- Marc Pingris – 2024
- Kenny Rocacurva – 2024

=== PBA players ===
Ex-PBA players

- Jason Ballesteros
- KG Canaleta
- Mark Cardona
- Marvin Hayes
- Jayjay Helterbrand
- Carlo Lastimosa
- Michael Mabulac
- Denok Miranda
- Josan Nimes
- Marc Pingris
- Pamboy Raymundo
- Jai Reyes
- Renzo Subido

=== Other notable players ===
- Ronnie Alonte

== Season-by-season records ==
League champions
Division champions
Qualified for playoffs
Best regular season record

=== Maharlika Pilipinas Basketball League ===
Season	Regular season							Playoffs	
Season	Division	Finish	GP	W	L	PCT	GB	Stage	Results
Laguna Heroes
2018–19; Datu Cup	South	9th	25	10	15	.400	10	Did not qualify	
Biñan City Luxxe White
2019–20; Lakan Season	South	10th	30	12	18	.400	14	Did not qualify	
Laguna Heroes
2022	South	10th	21	3	18	.143	15	Did not qualify	
Laguna Krah Asia
2023	South	13th	27	4	23	.148	18.5	Did not qualify	
Biñan Tatak Gel
2024	South	3rd	28	20	8	.714	1	Division quarterfinals	lost vs. South Cotabato, 1–2
2025	South	6th	29	17	12	.586	8	Division quarterfinals Division semifinals Division finals	won vs. Rizal, 2–0 won vs. Batangas City, 2–1 lost vs. Quezon, 2–3
2026	South	2nd	25	21	4	.840	–	Division quarterfinals Division semifinals Division finals	won vs. Mindoro, 2–0 won vs. Rizal, 2–0 lost vs. Quezon, 1–3
All-time regular season record			185	87	98	.470		3 playoff appearances	
All-time playoff record			21	12	9	.571		0 finals appearances	
All-time overall record			206	99	107	.481		0 championships	

=== Pilipinas Super League ===
Season	Regular season						Playoffs	
Season	Finish	GP	W	L	PCT	GB	Stage	Results
Biñan Tatak Gel
2023–24; President's Cup	1st	18	17	1	.944	—	First round Quarterfinals; Semifinals	won vs. RCP–Shawarma Shack, 1–0 won vs. Muntinlupa, 1–0 lost vs. Quezon, 0–2
2024–25; President's Cup 2024–2025	5th	10	7	3	.700	2	Quarterfinals 1 Quarterfinals 2	won vs. Pilipinas Navy, 1–0 lost vs. Pangasinan, 0–1
All-time regular season record		28	24	4	.857		2 playoff appearances	
All-time playoff record		6	3	3	.500		0 finals appearances	
All-time overall record		34	27	7	.794		0 championships	
