= 2024–25 Pilipinas Super League season =

4th tournament of the Pilipinas Super League

- League: Pilipinas Super League
- Sport: Basketball
- Duration: Regular season: December 21, 2024 – February 11, 2025; Playoffs: February 14–25, 2025; Finals: February 27 – March 3, 2025
- Games: 55 (regular season); 14 (playoffs)
- Teams: 11

Regular season
- Top seed: Caloocan Supremos
- Season MVP: Michael Calisaan

Finals
- Champions: Caloocan Supremos
- Runners-up: San Juan Kings
- Finals MVP: Jeramer Cabanag

PSL seasons
- ← 2023–24 2026–27 →

The 2024–25 Pilipinas Super League season, also known as the President's Cup, was the fourth season of the Pilipinas Super League (PSL) Pro Division. The regular season began on December 21, 2024 and ended on February 11, 2025.

== Teams ==
In the lead-up to the President's Cup 2024–2025, the league gradually revealed the teams that would take part in the season. Only three teams made their return from previous seasons: the Biñan Tatak Gel, Caloocan Supremos, and San Juan Kings. The reigning league champions, the Quezon Titans are not among the teams competing.

List of 2024–25 Pilipinas Super League teams
Team	Locality	Overall statistics			2023–24 season statistics	
Team	Locality	Apps.	Last	Best result	Record	Playoff result
Biñan Tatak Gel	Biñan, Laguna	2	2023–24	Fourth place (2023–24)	17–1 (.944)	Fourth place
Caloocan Supremos	Caloocan	3	2023–24	Quarterfinals (2022–23, 2023–24)	14–4 (.778)	Quarterfinals
Chichi Albayanos Wild Catz	Albay	1	New team		—N/a	
Davao del Norte – Pablo Valiant Kings	Davao del Norte	1	New team		—N/a	
GenSan Warriors	General Santos	1	New team		—N/a	
Lipa Batangas Stallions	Lipa, Batangas	1	New team		—N/a	
Malabon Verdiamonds Jewellers (Note: Competed as Verdiamonds Jewellers. The new location identifier was made midseason.)	Malabon (Note: Location identifier was originally Marikina.)	1	New team		—N/a	
Pangasinan Abono Reapers	Pangasinan	1	New team		—N/a	
Pilipinas Navy Aguilas	Philippine Navy	1	New team		—N/a	
Pureblends Similan Black Fox	—N/a	1	New team		—N/a	
San Juan Kings	San Juan	3	2023–24	Third place (2023–24)	16–2 (.889)	Third place

== Regular season ==
The regular season began on December 21, 2024.

=== Format ===
Like the previous tournament, every team will compete in a single round-robin format, playing against all other teams once. The top ten teams will advance to the playoffs.

=== Standings ===
Pos	Team	Pld	W	L	PCT	GB	Qualification
1	Caloocan Supremos	10	9	1	.900	—	Semifinals
2	GenSan Warriors	10	8	2	.800 (Note: General Santos (2–0) wins tiebreaker over San Juan (1–1), and Pangasinan (0–2) based on head-to-head record.)	1	Semifinals
3	San Juan Kings	10	8	2	.800	1	Quarterfinal Round 1
4	Pangasinan Abono Reapers	10	8	2	.800	1	Quarterfinal Round 1
5	Biñan Tatak Gel	10	7	3	.700	2	Quarterfinal Round 1
6	Malabon Verdiamonds Jewellers	10	5	5	.500	4	Quarterfinal Round 1
7	Davao del Norte – Pablo Valiant Kings	10	4	6	.400	5	Quarterfinal Round 1
8	Pilipinas Navy Aguilas	10	3	7	.300	6	Quarterfinal Round 1
9	Pureblends Similar Black Fox	10	2	8	.200	7	Quarterfinal Round 1
10	Top Tier Athletics – Lipa Batangas Stallions	10	1	9	.100	8	Quarterfinal Round 1
11	Chichi Albayanos Wild Catz	10	0	10	.000	9	

Updated to match(es) played on February 7, 2025. Source: Standings – via Genius Sports
Rules for classification: 1) Winning percentage; 2) Head-to-head standings; 3) Head-to-head point differential; 4) Head-to-head points scored; 5) Overall point differential; 6) Overall points scored.

=== Results table ===
Team	Game									
Team	1	2	3	4	5	6	7	8	9	10
Biñan (BIÑ)	GS; 70–64	PUR; 94–72	PIL; 89–72	CAL; 67–70	PGS; 78–90	LIP; 133–86	CHI; 20–0	DVN; 83–65	SJ; 71–79	MAL; 97–87
Caloocan (CAL)	CHI; 108–84	DVN; 96–77	PUR; 83–72	PIL; 90–77	BIÑ; 70–67	LIP; 126–91	SJ; 78–75	MAL; 92–75	PGS; 63–65	GS; 100–79
Chichi Albayanos (CHI)	CAL; 84–108	PUR; 92–114	GS; 61–102	MAL; 87–100	LIP; 107–123	SJ; 75–116	PIL; 120–127	PGS; 65–129	BIÑ; 0–20	DVN; 0–20
Davao del Norte (DVN)	PUR; 97–75	CAL; 77–96	SJ; 63–69	MAL; 77–94	PIL; 102–78	GS; 75–90	LIP; 96–59	PGS; 74–86	BIÑ; 65–83	CHI; 20–0
General Santos (GS)	BIÑ; 64–70	LIP; 109–106	CHI; 102–61	SJ; 89–86*	PGS; 74–72	MAL; 86–76	DVN; 90–75	PUR; 91–81	PIL; 104–95	CAL; 79–100
Lipa Batangas (LIP)	GS; 106–109	MAL; 76–96	PGS; 71–88	CHI; 123–107	CAL; 91–126	DVN; 59–96	BIÑ; 86–133	SJ; 85–140	PIL; 97–100	PUR; 101–107
Malabon (MAL)	PGS; 57–80	LIP; 96–76	CHI; 100–87	DVN; 94–77	GS; 76–86	PUR; 100–96	PIL; 112–104	CAL; 72–95	SJ; 83–96	BIÑ; 87–97
Pangasinan (PGS)	MAL; 80–57	PIL; 110–92	LIP; 88–71	GS; 72–74	SJ; 83–86	BIÑ; 90–78	CHI; 129–65	DVN; 86–74	PUR; 109–90	CAL; 65–63
Pilipinas Navy (PIL)	SJ; 71–100	PGS; 92–110	BIÑ; 72–89	CAL; 77–90	PUR; 79–74	DVN; 78–102	CHI; 127–120	MAL; 104–112	GS; 95–104	LIP; 100–97
Pureblends (PUR)	DVN; 75–97	CHI; 114–92	BIÑ; 72–94	CAL; 72–83	SJ; 64–94	PIL; 74–79	MAL; 96–100	GS; 81–91	PGS; 90–109	LIP; 107–101
San Juan (SJ)	PIL; 100–71	DVN; 69–63	GS; 86–89*	PUR; 94–64	PGS; 86–83	CHI; 116–75	CAL; 75–78	LIP; 140–85	MAL; 96–83	BIÑ; 79–71

Source: Schedule
Legend: Blue = win; Red = loss; Matches with lighter background shading were decided after overtime. (*) Number of asterisks denotes number of overtime periods

Notes

- The final two games of the Chichi Albayanos Wild Cats were forfeited due to unforeseen circumstances.

== Playoffs ==
Quarterfinals 1 (twice-to-beat)
4	Pangasinan	108
9	Pureblends	85
5	Biñan	105
8	Pilipinas Navy	63
3	San Juan	117
10	Lipa Batangas	82
6	Malabon	84
7	Davao del Norte	81

Quarterfinals 2 (twice-to-beat)
4	Pangasinan	79
5	Biñan	59
3	San Juan	79
6	Malabon	74

Semifinals (best-of-three)
1	Caloocan	69	79	71
4	Pangasinan	60	85*	64
2	GenSan	51	78
3	San Juan	80	90

Finals (best-of-three)
1	Caloocan	68	64	61
3	San Juan	72	55	59

== Awards ==
The league's individual season awards were handed out during halftime of Game 2 of the Finals series on March 1, 2025 at the Filoil EcoOil Centre in San Juan, Metro Manila. The Finals Most Valuable Player was later awarded at the conclusion of the series.

Awards	Recipient	Team
Most Valuable Player	Michael Calisaan	San Juan Kings
Finals Most Valuable Player	Jeramer Cabanag	Caloocan Supremos
PSL Mythical Team	Michael Calisaan	San Juan Kings
PSL Mythical Team	Orlan Wamar Jr.	San Juan Kings
PSL Mythical Team	Chris Bitoon	Caloocan Supremos
PSL Mythical Team	Michael Mabulac	Pangasinan Abono Reapers
PSL Mythical Team	Jorey Napoles	Pangasinan Abono Reapers
