= 2024 MPVA season =

Women's volleyball season in the Philippines

Tournament details
- Dates: Preliminary round: August 11 – November 13, 2024; Final round: November 18 – 27, 2024
- Teams: 9
- Venue: 6

Final positions
- Champions: Quezon Tangerines (1st title)
- Runners-up: Biñan Tatak Gel Volley Angels
- Third place: Rizal St. Gerrard Charity Foundation
- Fourth place: Bacoor City Strikers

Tournament awards
- MVP: Rhea Mae Densing (Quezon)
- Best Setter: Chenae Basarte (Quezon)
- Best OH: Erika Deloria (Biñan); Johna Dolorito (Rizal)
- Best MB: Cristy Ondangan (Quezon); Zenneth Perolino (Biñan)
- Best OPP: Rhea Mae Densing (Quezon)
- Best Libero: Angelica Blue Guzman (Rizal)

Tournament statistics
- Matches played: 78

The 2024 MPVA season, also referred to as MPVA Season 1, was the first full-length season of the Maharlika Pilipinas Volleyball Association (MPVA) and its second overall. The preliminary round began on August 11, 2024. This season will see two new teams: the Quezon Tangerines and Valenzuela Classy.

The Bacoor City Strikers enter this season as defending champions.

== Teams ==
This season features nine teams, including two expansion teams. The Valenzuela Classy was first announced on July 10, 2024 while the Quezon Tangerines were announced two weeks later on July 24. Of the eight teams that took part in the inaugural season, the Nasipit Lady Spikers are the only team that did not return to the league.

== Venues ==
Preliminary round
Alonte Sports Arena; Biñan, Laguna	Marikina Sports Center; Marikina	Paco Arena; Manila
Capacity: 6,500	Capacity: 7,000	Capacity: 1,000
Quezon Convention Center; Lucena, Quezon	Strike Gymnasium; Bacoor, Cavite	Ynares Sports Arena; Pasig
Capacity: 7,000	Capacity: 1,500	Capacity: 3,000

== Preliminary round ==
The preliminary round began on August 11, 2024, with the opening gameday held at Strike Gymnasium in Bacoor, Cavite. The opening game that day is a rematch of last season's finals between the runner-up Negros Blue Hawks and the defending champion Bacoor City Strikers in their home venue.

The preliminary round will now utilize a double round-robin tournament format, where each team will play two games against all other teams. Each team is expected to play sixteen games this season. Only the top four teams will advance to the final round, which is halved from the previous season's eight teams.

=== Pool standing procedure ===
- First, teams are ranked by the number of match points, wherein:
  - Match won 3–0 or 3–1: 3 match points for the winner, 0 match points for the loser.
  - Match won 3–2: 2 match points for the winner, 1 match point for the loser.
- If the number of match points is tied, the tied teams are then ranked by match wins.
- In case of any further ties, the following criteria shall be used:
1. Set ratio: number of sets won divided by number of sets lost.
2. Setpoint ratio: number of points scored divided by number of points allowed.
3. Head-to-head standings: any remaining tied teams are ranked based on the results of head-to-head matches involving the teams in question.

=== Standings ===
Pos	Team	Pld	W	L	Pts	SW	SL	SR	SPW	SPL	SPR	Qualification
1	Quezon Tangerines	16	14	2	42	44	15	2.933	1406	1126	1.249	Twice-to-beat in semifinals
2	Bacoor City Strikers	16	12	4	36	41	16	2.563	1343	1124	1.195	Twice-to-beat in semifinals
3	Biñan Tatak Gel Volley Angels	16	11	5	35	39	18	2.167	1277	1145	1.115	Twice-to-win in semifinals
4	Rizal St. Gerrard Charity Foundation	16	11	5	30	36	21	1.714	1315	1204	1.092	Twice-to-win in semifinals
5	Caloocan AM Spikers	16	8	8	24	28	30	0.933	1309	1254	1.044	
6	San Juan Lady Knights	16	6	10	18	26	36	0.722	1194	1345	0.888	
7	Negros Blue Hawks	16	5	11	16	21	36	0.583	1204	1256	0.959	
8	Valenzuela Classy	16	4	12	12	19	40	0.475	1160	1360	0.853	
9	Marikina Lady Shoemasters	16	0	16	0	1	48	0.021	734	1200	0.612	

Updated to match(es) played on November 13, 2024. Source:
Rules for classification: Pool standing procedure

=== Match results ===
The team abbreviation in parentheses indicates the designated host team for that gameday.

==== Round 1 ====
Date	Time	Venue		Score		Set 1	Set 2	Set 3	Set 4	Set 5	Total	Report
Aug. 11	04:00 pm	Strike Gymnasium (BCR)	Bacoor City Strikers	3–0	Negros Blue Hawks	25–17	25–19	25–17			75–53	
Aug. 13	02:00 pm	Strike Gymnasium (BCR)	Bacoor City Strikers	2–3	Rizal Golden Coolers	25–18	20–25	25–21	21–25	20–22	111–111	
Aug. 13	04:00 pm	Strike Gymnasium (BCR)	San Juan Lady Knights	1–3	Negros Blue Hawks	26–24	18–25	20–25	25–27		89–101	
Aug. 14	02:00 pm	Strike Gymnasium (BCR)	Valenzuela Classy	0–3	Quezon Tangerines	19–25	21–25	22–25			62–75	
Aug. 14	04:00 pm	Strike Gymnasium (BCR)	San Juan Lady Knights	0–3	Bacoor City Strikers	11–25	21–25	18–25			50–75	
Aug. 19	11:30 am	Alonte Sports Arena (BIÑ)	Quezon Tangerines	3–1	Rizal Golden Coolers	25–14	27–29	25–19	25–14		102–76	
Aug. 19	02:00 pm	Alonte Sports Arena (BIÑ)	San Juan Lady Knights	3–1	Valenzuela Classy	22–25	25–21	25–22	25–18		97–86	
Aug. 19	04:00 pm	Alonte Sports Arena (BIÑ)	Biñan Tatak Gel Volley Angels	3–1	Caloocan AM Spikers	25–20	25–23	23–25	26–24		99–92	
Aug. 22	02:00 pm	Alonte Sports Arena (BIÑ)	Caloocan AM Spikers	2–3	Negros Blue Hawks	25–17	23–25	18–25	25–20	8–15	99–102	
Aug. 22	04:00 pm	Alonte Sports Arena (BIÑ)	Rizal Golden Coolers	3–2	Biñan Tatak Gel Volley Angels	25–21	25–22	18–25	23–25	15–12	106–105	
Aug. 26	11:30 am	Strike Gymnasium (SJ)	Negros Blue Hawks	0–3	Biñan Tatak Gel Volley Angels	18–25	15–25	17–25			50–75	
Aug. 26	02:00 pm	Strike Gymnasium (SJ)	San Juan Lady Knights	3–0	Marikina Lady Shoemasters	25–17	25–14	25–22			75–53	
Aug. 26	04:00 pm	Strike Gymnasium (SJ)	Valenzuela Classy	1–3	Bacoor City Strikers	25–23	18–25	17–25	17–25		77–98	
Aug. 27	11:30 am	Strike Gymnasium (SJ)	Biñan Tatak Gel Volley Angels	2–3	Quezon Tangerines	30–28	23–25	18–25	25-18	9–15	105–93	
Aug. 27	02:00 pm	Strike Gymnasium (SJ)	Marikina Lady Shoemasters	0–3	Negros Blue Hawks	23–25	23–25	19–25			65–75	
Aug. 27	04:00 pm	Strike Gymnasium (SJ)	Caloocan AM Spikers	3–1	San Juan Lady Knights	25–21	20–25	25–22	25–18		95–86	
Sept. 5	02:00 pm	Paco Arena (NEG)	Biñan Tatak Gel Volley Angels	3–0	Valenzuela Classy	25–17	26–24	25–17			76–58	
Sept. 5	04:00 pm	Paco Arena (NEG)	Quezon Tangerines	3–0	Marikina Lady Shoemasters	25–6	25–23	25–21			75–50	
Sept. 9	02:00 pm	Paco Arena (NEG)	Caloocan AM Spikers	0–3	Bacoor City Strikers	17–25	13–25	20–25			50–75	
Sept. 9	04:00 pm	Paco Arena (NEG)	Valenzuela Classy	3–2	Negros Blue Hawks	22–25	25–20	18–25	26–24	16–14	107–108	
Sept. 10	02:00 pm	Paco Arena (NEG)	Bacoor City Strikers	3–0	Biñan Tatak Gel Volley Angels	25–19	25–23	25–20			75–62	
Sept. 10	04:00 pm	Paco Arena (NEG)	Negros Blue Hawks	1–3	Quezon Tangerines	27–25	20–25	11–25	16–25		74–100	
Sept. 12	11:30 am	Paco Arena (VAL)	Biñan Tatak Gel Volley Angels	3–0	Marikina Lady Shoemasters	25–14	25–11	25–10			75–35	
Sept. 12	02:00 pm	Paco Arena (VAL)	Caloocan AM Spikers	0–3	Quezon Tangerines	16–25	18–25	19–25			53–75	
Sept. 12	04:00 pm	Paco Arena (VAL)	Rizal St. Gerrard Charity Foundation	3–0	Valenzuela Classy	25–14	25–17	25–20			75–51	
Sept. 16	11:30 am	Paco Arena (VAL)	Quezon Tangerines	3–1	San Juan Lady Knights	25–18	25–16	12–25	25–20		87–79	
Sept. 16	02:00 pm	Paco Arena (VAL)	Valenzuela Classy	1–3	Caloocan AM Spikers	14–25	21–25	25–17	18–25		78–92	
Sept. 16	04:00 pm	Paco Arena (VAL)	Marikina Lady Shoemasters	0–3	Rizal St. Gerrard Charity Foundation	14–25	17–25	15–25			46–75	
Sept. 17	02:00 pm	Strike Gymnasium (CAL)	Biñan Tatak Gel Volley Angels	3–0	San Juan Lady Knights	25–21	25–16	25–15			75–52	
Sept. 17	04:00 pm	Strike Gymnasium (CAL)	Caloocan AM Spikers	0–3	Rizal St. Gerrard Charity Foundation	25–27	22–25	21–25			68–77	
Sept. 17	06:00 pm	Strike Gymnasium (CAL)	Marikina Lady Shoemasters	0–3	Bacoor City Strikers	11–25	10–25	15–25			36–75	
Sept. 18	04:00 pm	Strike Gymnasium (CAL)	Negros Blue Hawks	0–3	Rizal St. Gerrard Charity Foundation18–25	21–25	15–25				36–50	
Sept. 18	06:00 pm	Strike Gymnasium (CAL)	Marikina Lady Shoemasters	1–3	Valenzuela Classy	16–25	18–25	25–17	12–25		71–92	
Sept. 20	02:00 pm	Paco Arena (CAL)	Quezon Tangerines	3–1	Bacoor City Strikers	25–17	25–18	20–25	30–28		100–88	
Sept. 20	04:00 pm	Paco Arena (CAL)	San Juan Lady Knights	2–3	Rizal St. Gerrard Charity Foundation	25–19	14–25	20–25	25–20	12–15	96–104	
Sept. 20	06:00 pm	Paco Arena (CAL)	Caloocan AM Spikers	3–0	Marikina Lady Shoemasters	25–18	25–13	25–22			75–53	

==== Round 2 ====
Date	Time	Venue		Score		Set 1	Set 2	Set 3	Set 4	Set 5	Total	Report
Sept. 23	04:00 pm	Paco Arena (MAR)	Bacoor City Strikers	3–0	Rizal St. Gerrard Charity Foundation	25–18	26–24	25–23			76–65	
Sept. 23	06:00 pm	Paco Arena (MAR)	Quezon Tangerines	3–0	Marikina Lady Shoemasters	25–13	25–8	25–8			75–29	
Sept. 26	02:00 pm	Marikina Sports Center (MAR)	Biñan Tatak Gel Volley Angels	3–2	Quezon Tangerines	14–25	14–25	25–23	34–32	15–8	102–113	
Sept. 26	04:00 pm	Marikina Sports Center (MAR)	San Juan Lady Knights	2–3	Caloocan AM Spikers	23–25	25–20	25–22	17–25	13–15	103–107	
Sept. 26	06:00 pm	Marikina Sports Center (MAR)	Rizal St. Gerrard Charity Foundation	3–0	Marikina Lady Shoemasters	25–23	25–18	25–19			75–60	
Oct. 1	02:00 pm	Ynares Sports Arena (RZL)	Marikina Lady Shoemasters	0–3	San Juan Lady Knights	12–25	11–25	22–25			45–75	
Oct. 1	04:00 pm	Ynares Sports Arena (RZL)	Valenzuela Classy	1–3	Quezon Tangerines	16–25	25–22	18–25	19–25		78–97	
Oct. 1	06:00 pm	Ynares Sports Arena (RZL)	Rizal St. Gerrard Charity Foundation	3–0	Biñan Tatak Gel Volley Angels	25–21	25–18	25–18			75–57	
Oct. 2	02:00 pm	Ynares Sports Arena (RZL)	Negros Blue Hawks	3–0	Marikina Lady Shoemasters	25–9	25–13	25–15			75–37	
Oct. 2	04:00 pm	Ynares Sports Arena (RZL)	San Juan Lady Knights	3–1	Rizal St. Gerrard Charity Foundation	25–19	21–25	25–23	26–24		97–91	
Oct. 3	11:30 pm	Ynares Sports Arena (RZL)	Bacoor City Strikers	3–2	Biñan Tatak Gel Volley Angels	20–25	25–22	25–16	21–25	15–3	106–91	
Oct. 3	02:00 pm	Ynares Sports Arena (RZL)	Caloocan AM Spikers	3–1	Valenzuela Classy	25–15	22–25	25–17	25–19		97–76	
Oct. 3	04:00 pm	Ynares Sports Arena (RZL)	Rizal St. Gerrard Charity Foundation	3–0	Negros Blue Hawks	25–17	25–14	28–26			78–57	
Oct. 12	02:00 pm	Quezon Convention Center (QZN)	Bacoor City Strikers	3–0	Negros Blue Hawks	25–20	27–25	25–23			77–68	
Oct. 12	04:00 pm	Quezon Convention Center (QZN)	Quezon Tangerines	3–1	Caloocan AM Spikers	23–25	25–14	25–21	25–12		98–72	
Oct. 13	02:00 pm	Quezon Convention Center (QZN)	Marikina Lady Shoemasters	0–3	Biñan Tatak Gel Volley Angels	15–25	17–25	12–25			44–75	
Oct. 13	04:00 pm	Quezon Convention Center (QZN)	Quezon Tangerines	3–0	Rizal St. Gerrard Charity Foundation	25–21	25–20	25–23			75–64	
Oct. 15	02:00 pm	Alonte Sports Arena (BIÑ)	San Juan Lady Knights	3–2	Negros Blue Hawks	22–25	22–25	25–24	25–14	15–12	109–100	
Oct. 15	04:00 pm	Alonte Sports Arena (BIÑ)	Biñan Tatak Gel Volley Angels	3–0	Valenzuela Classy	25–14	25–17	25–22			75–53	
Oct. 16	02:00 pm	Alonte Sports Arena (BIÑ)	San Juan Lady Knights	3–2	Valenzuela Classy	25–8	25–10	19–25	15–25	15–10	99–78	
Oct 16	04:00 pm	Alonte Sports Arena (BIÑ)	Biñan Tatak Gel Volley Angels	3–0	Negros Blue Hawks	25–16	25–16	26–24			76–56	
Oct. 22	02:00 pm	Alonte Sports Arena (BIÑ)	Quezon Tangerines	3–1	Bacoor City Strikers	25–18	23–25	25–16	25–18		98–77	
Oct. 22	04:00 pm	Alonte Sports Arena (BIÑ)	Biñan Tatak Gel Volley Angels	3–0	Caloocan AM Spikers	25–23	26–24	25–16			76–63	
Nov. 3	02:00 pm	Strike Gymnasium (BCR)	Negros Blue Hawks	0–3	Caloocan AM Spikers	15–25	15–25	26–28			56–78	
Nov. 3	04:00 pm	Strike Gymnasium (BCR)	Bacoor City Strikers	3–0	Valenzuela Classy	25–14	25–18	25–22			75–54	
Nov. 4	11:30 am	Strike Gymnasium (BCR)	San Juan Lady Knights	0–3	Quezon Tangerines	19–25	14–25	19–25			52–75	
Nov. 4	02:00 pm	Strike Gymnasium (BCR)	Valenzuela Classy	3–1	Negros Blue Hawks	25–21	8–25	25–20	25–14		83–80	
Nov. 4	04:00 pm	Strike Gymnasium (BCR)	Marikina Lady Shoemasters	0–3	Bacoor City Strikers	10–25	14–25	19–25			43–75	
Nov. 6	11:30 am	Strike Gymnasium (BCR)	Valenzuela Classy	3–0	Marikina Lady Shoemasters	25–19	26–24	27–25			78–68	
Nov. 6	02:00 pm	Strike Gymnasium (BCR)	San Juan Lady Knights	0–3	Biñan Tatak Gel Volley Angels	23–25	21–25	18–25			62–75	
Nov. 6	04:00 pm	Strike Gymnasium (BCR)	Bacoor City Strikers	1–3	Caloocan AM Spikers	25–18	22–25	17–25	23–25		87–93	
Nov. 11	02:00 pm	Strike Gymnasium (BCR)	Quezon Tangerines	0–3	Negros Blue Hawks	22–25	22–25	12–25			56–75	
Nov. 11	04:00 pm	Strike Gymnasium (BCR)	Caloocan AM Spikers	3–1	Rizal St. Gerrard Charity Foundation	25–22	25–21	22–25	28–26		100–94	
Nov. 11	06:00 pm	Strike Gymnasium (BCR)	Bacoor City Strikers	3–1	San Juan Lady Knights	25–8	23–25	25–21	25–19		98–73	
Nov. 13	02:00 pm	Strike Gymnasium (BCR)	Marikina Lady Shoemasters	0–3	Caloocan AM Spikers	5–25	7–25	7–25			19–75	
Nov. 13	04:00 pm	Strike Gymnasium (BCR)	Valenzuela Classy	0–3	Rizal St. Gerrard Charity Foundation	23–25	14–25	12–25			49–75	

== Final round ==
In the semifinals, the top two teams will gain a twice-to-beat advantage over their opponents. The losers of the semifinals series will compete in a single bronze medal match while the winners compete in a best-of-three finals series. If a team goes undefeated in the preliminary round, the final round will switch to a stepladder format similar to collegiate sports.

=== Bracket ===
Semifinals (Twice-to-beat)
1	Quezon Tangerines	3	–
4	Rizal St. Gerrard Charity Foundation	2	–
2	Bacoor City Strikers	0	0
3	Biñan Tatak Gel Volley Angels	3	3

Finals (Best-of-three)
1	Quezon Tangerines	3	3	–
3	Biñan Tatak Gel Volley Angels	2	1	–
Bronze Medal Match (single match)
4	Rizal St. Gerrard Charity Foundation	3
2	Bacoor City Strikers	0

=== Semifinals ===
(1) Quezon Tangerines vs. (4) Rizal St. Gerrard Charity Foundation

Date	Time	Venue		Score		Set 1	Set 2	Set 3	Set 4	Set 5	Total	Report
Nov. 18	02:00 pm	Strike Gymnasium (BCR)	Quezon Tangerines	3–2	Rizal St. Gerrard Charity Foundation	25–22	25–22	23–25	19–25	15–10	107–104	

(2) Bacoor City Strikers vs. (3) Biñan Tatak Gel Volley Angels

Date	Time	Venue		Score		Set 1	Set 2	Set 3	Set 4	Set 5	Total	Report
Nov. 18	04:00 pm	Strike Gymnasium (BCR)	Biñan Tatak Gel Volley Angels	3–0	Bacoor City Strikers	25–18	25–18	25–16			75–52	
Nov. 20	04:30 pm	Alonte Sports Arena (BIÑ)	Bacoor City Strikers	0–3	Biñan Tatak Gel Volley Angels	21–25	24–26	21–25			66–76	

=== Bronze Medal Match ===
Date	Time	Venue		Score		Set 1	Set 2	Set 3	Set 4	Set 5	Total	Report
Nov. 25	04:00 pm	Alonte Sports Arena (BIÑ)	Rizal St. Gerrard Charity Foundation	3–0	Bacoor City Strikers	25–21	25–19	25–22			75–62	

=== Finals ===
Date	Time	Venue		Score		Set 1	Set 2	Set 3	Set 4	Set 5	Total	Report
Nov. 25	06:00 pm	Alonte Sports Arena (BIÑ)	Quezon Tangerines	3–2	Biñan Tatak Gel Volley Angels	25–19	23–25	25–18	21–25	17–15	111–102	
Nov. 27	06:00 pm	Quezon Convention Center (QZN)	Biñan Tatak Gel Volley Angels	1–3	Quezon Tangerines	19–25	26–24	18–25	15–25		78–99	

== Final standings ==
Rank	Team
1st place, gold medalist(s)	Quezon Tangerines
2nd place, silver medalist(s)	Biñan Tatak Gel Volley Angels
3rd place, bronze medalist(s)	Rizal St. Gerrard Charity Foundation
4	Bacoor City Strikers
5	Caloocan AM Spikers
6	San Juan Lady Knights
7	Negros Blue Hawks
8	Valenzuela Classy
9	Marikina Lady Shoemasters

2024 MPVA season champions
Quezon Tangerines
1st title

Team roster
Jessa Dorog (c), Chenae Basarte, Shekaina Rhedge Lleses, Shahanna Rheign Lleses, Fiona Marie Getigan, Zen Reina Basilio, Rhea Mae Densing, Mycah Ramos Go, Sophia Margarette Badion, Amaka Tan, Fiona Marie Innocentes, Alyzandrianne Limpot, Cristy Ondangan, Mary Grace Borromeo, Lenie Rose Sapallo, Kim Alison Estenzo, Francis Mae Flores, Franceska Faye Delgado, Corrine Allyson Apostol
Head coach
Rogelio Getigan

== Awards and medalists ==
=== Individual awards ===
Award	Player	Team	Ref.
Most Valuable Player	Rhea Mae Densing	Quezon	
1st Best Outside Spiker	Erika Deloria	Biñan	
2nd Best Outside Spiker	Johna Dolorito	Rizal	
1st Best Middle Blocker	Cristy Ondangan	Quezon	
2nd Best Middle Blocker	Zenneth Perolino	Biñan	
Best Opposite Spiker	Rhea Mae Densing	Quezon	
Best Setter	Chenae Basarte	Quezon	
Best Libero	Angelica Blue Guzman	Rizal	
Best Homegrown Player	May Ann Nuique	Biñan	

=== Medalists ===
Gold	Silver	Bronze
Quezon Tangerines: Jessa Dorog (c); Chenae Basarte; Shekaina Rhedge Lleses; Shahanna Rheign Lleses; Fiona Marie Getigan; Zen Reina Basilio; Rhea Mae Densing; Mycah Go; Sophia Margarette Badion; Amaka Tan; Fiona Marie Inocentes; Alyzandrianne Limpot; Cristy Ondangan; Mary Grace Borromeo; Lenie Rose Sapallo; Kim Alison Estenzo; Francis Mae Flores; Franceska Faye Delgado; Corrine Allyson Apostol Head Coach: Rogelio Getigan	Biñan Tatak Gel Volley Angels: Erika Jin Deloria (c); Madieson Gonzales; Rhean Almendralejo; Abby Gail Eusebio; Chreizel Aguilar; Shane Carmona; Althea Botor; Aurea Claudette Alvero; Zenneth Irene Perolino; Alyssa Ashley Santos; Honey Grace Cordero; Ashanti Quiocho; Jen Kylene Villegas; Dana Gabrielle Del Rosario; Lyka Platino; Stephanie Joyce Barilla; Ma. Michaela Ma; Chumcee Caole; May Ann Nuique; Marilla Alberto Head Coach: Ariel Dela Cruz	Rizal St. Gerrard Charity Foundation: Venice Puzon (c); Angelica Blue Guzman; Vanessa Martin; Joanne De Guzman; Angelica Cruz; Janeth Tulang; Marcela Rivas; Stacey Lopez; Roxie Dela Cruz; Katrina Galedo; Joan Doguna; Johna Denise Dolorito; Hiromi Osada; Heart Bio; Ma. Cleofe Lopez; Angelica Cerna; Anamarie Perez; Ma. Arabella Borbon; Ashley Muschillas; Joana Marie Palarca; Andrea Jardio Head Coach: Cromwell Garcia

== Media coverage ==
This will be the season season in which games are aired on Media Pilipinas TV (MPTV) on television. The league will continue to stream all of the games on its social media channels.
