= Mary Rhose Dapol =

Filipino volleyball player

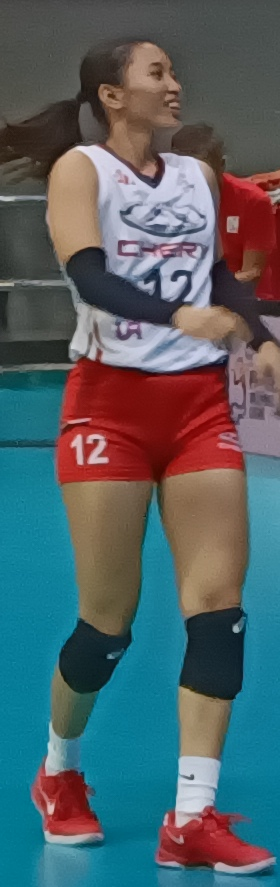
- Dapol in 2025

Personal information
- Nationality: Filipino
- Born: December 1, 2000 (age 25)
- Home town: Lucena, Quezon
- Education: San Sebastian; Perpetual Help
- Height: 1.70 m (5 ft 7 in)

Volleyball information
- Position: Outside Hitter
- Current team: Akari Chargers

Career
- Years: Team
- 2023: Foton Tornadoes
- 2023: Bacoor City Strikers
- 2024–2025: Chery Tiggo Crossovers
- 2026: L. Maabaidhoo
- 2026–present: Akari Chargers

Mary Rhose Dapol (born December 1, 2000) is a Filipino professional volleyball player. She is currently playing for the Akari Chargers in the Premier Volleyball League (PVL).

== Career ==
=== Collegiate ===
Dapol played for the Lady Stags of the San Sebastian College – Recoletos in the National Collegiate Athletic Association (NCAA).

After a year playing for the Lady Stags, she decided to transfer to University of Perpetual Help System Dalta and played for the Perpetual Lady Altas.

=== Club ===
Dapol first joined the Premier Volleyball League (PVL) through the Foton Tornadoes and played for them in the 2023 Invitational Conference under a special guest license.

She later played for the Bacoor City Strikers in the Maharlika Pilipinas Volleyball Association (MPVA) helping the team win the 2023 inaugural championship.

Despite the institution of the PVL draft in July 2024, Dapol was signed directly by Chery Tiggo Crossovers in June 2024 bypassing the inaugural draft having already played for Foton. She stayed with the Crossovers until the club's disbandment in December 2025.

Dapol went to the Maldives to play for Laamu Maabaidhoo of the Raajje Super League, helping the club win the inaugural season held in early January 2026. Shortly after, Dapol returned to the PVL and joined the Akari Chargers.

== Clubs ==
- (Philippines) Foton Tornadoes (2023)
- (Philippines) Bacoor City Strikers (2023)
- (Philippines) Chery Tiggo Crossovers (2024–2025)
- (Maldives) L. Maabaidhoo (2026)
- (Philippines) Akari Chargers (2026–present)

== Awards ==
=== Individual ===
| Year | League | Season/Conference | Award | Ref |
|---|---|---|---|---|
| 2023 | NCAA | 98 | Most Valuable Player (Season) | |
| 2023 | NCAA | 98 | 1st Best Outside Hitter | |
| 2023 | V-League | Collegiate | Most Valuable Player (Conference) | |

=== Collegiate ===
| Year | NCAA Season | Title | Ref |
|---|---|---|---|
| 2023 | 98 | 3rd place | |

=== Clubs ===
| Year | League | Season/Conference | Club | Title | Ref |
|---|---|---|---|---|---|
| 2023 | MPVA | Inaugural | Bacoor City Strikers | Champions | |
| 2026 | Raajje Super League | Inaugural | Laamu Maabaidhoo | Champions | |
