= Negros Blue Hawks =

Filipino women's volleyball team

- Founded: 2023
- Owner: Marcelino Agana
- Head coach: Jessie Barroga
- Captain: Charlotte Tutanes
- League: Maharlika Pilipinas Volleyball Association
- 2024 MPVA season: 7th place

The Negros Lady Blue Hawks, also referred to as the Negros–ICC Blue Hawks or the Negros Oriental Blue Hawks, is a Filipino women's developmental volleyball team based in Negros Oriental and representing the Negros island. The team currently competes in the Maharlika Pilipinas Volleyball Association (MPVA) as one of its charter teams in its inaugural season.

The team is owned by the Immaculada Concepcion College with Marcelino Agana as the team owner and backed by the provincial government of Negros Oriental.

== History ==
In September 2023, the team was first announced as one of the charter teams of the MPVA. At the time, they were simply known as the "Blue Hawks", as the team didn't have a designated home locality. Later on, it was announced that the team will be based in Negros Oriental. The team also appointed Edgar Barroga as the team's first head coach, Barroga was also appointed as the coach for San Beda's women's volleyball team earlier in the year.

=== First season ===
With 27 points and a 9–1 record, Negros clinched the best record of the preliminary round, only losing to Bacoor City in five sets in their second game. Despite a straight sets victory against San Juan in the quarterfinals, they started the Semifinals 0–1 against the Marikina Lady Shoemasters, Negros then won the next two matches to clinch a Finals berth against Bacoor City. Negros lost match 1 but won match 2 on visiting grounds. In match 3, Negros fell to the Strikers in straight sets, ending the season with a silver medal finish.

== Current roster ==
Negros Blue Hawks
Number	Player	Position	Height	Birth date	School
2	(Philippines) Andrea Caparal	Outside Hitter			
3	(Philippines) Irish Besmonte	Libero			
5	(Philippines) Lalaine Arizapa	Middle Blocker			
6	(Philippines) Christa Lynn Collado	Opposite Hitter			
7	(Philippines) Ivy Lhyn Aquino	Middle Blocker			
8	(Philippines) Charlotte Tutanes (C)	Setter			
9	(Philippines) Gelah Marie Lopez	Opposite Hitter			
10	(Philippines) Angeliz Cate Cosme	Outside Hitter			
11	(Philippines) Marjorie Orpilla	Outside Hitter			
12	(Philippines) Jennifer Bacud	Libero			
13	(Philippines) Ednelle Maniquis	Outside Hitter			
15	(Philippines) Rose Mary Tagaca	Middle Blocker			
17	(Philippines) Jehiel Moraga	Middle Blocker			
18	(Philippines) Cara Tamon	Setter			
20	(Philippines) Hannah Louise Ollina	Middle Blocker			
22	(Philippines) Ana Marie Hain	Libero			
	(Philippines) Samantha Catamora	Middle Blocker			
	(Philippines) Jem San Juan	Outside Hitter			
	(Philippines) Shekinah Barredo	Outside Hitter			
	(Philippines) Megan Gumban	Outside Hitter			
	(Philippines) Princess Maulana	Outside Hitter			
	(Philippines) Mariane Sarmiento	Middle Blocker			

== Previous roster ==
2024
Main article: 2024 MPVA season

Negros Blue Hawks
Number	Player	Position	Height	Birth date	School
2	(Philippines) Andrea Caparal	Outside Hitter			
3	(Philippines) Irish Besmonte	Libero			
5	(Philippines) Lalaine Arizapa	Middle Blocker			
6	(Philippines) Christa Lynn Collado	Opposite Hitter			
7	(Philippines) Ivy Lhyn Aquino	Middle Blocker			
8	(Philippines) Charlotte Tutanes (C)	Setter			
9	(Philippines) Gelah Marie Lopez	Opposite Hitter			
10	(Philippines) Angeliz Cate Cosme	Outside Hitter			
11	(Philippines) Marjorie Orpilla	Outside Hitter			
12	(Philippines) Jennifer Bacud	Libero			
13	(Philippines) Ednelle Maniquis	Outside Hitter			
15	(Philippines) Rose Mary Tagaca	Middle Blocker			
17	(Philippines) Jehiel Moraga	Outside Hitter			
18	(Philippines) Cara Tamon	Setter			
20	(Philippines) Hannah Louise Ollina	Middle Blocker			
22	(Philippines) Ana Marie Hain	Libero			
	(Philippines) Samantha Catamora	Middle Blocker			
	(Philippines) Jem San Juan	Outside Hitter			
	(Philippines) Shekinah Barredo	Outside Hitter			
	(Philippines) Megan Gumban	Outside Hitter			
	(Philippines) Princess Maulana	Outside Hitter			
	(Philippines) Mariane Sarmiento	Middle Blocker			

2023
Main article: 2023 MPVA season

Negros–ICC Blue Hawks
Number	Player	Position	Height	Birth date	School
2	(Philippines) Andrea Caparal	Outside Hitter			
3	(Philippines) Irish Besmonte	Libero			
4	(Philippines) Reyann Canete	Opposite Hitter			SSC–R
5	(Philippines) Christine Joy Apan	Middle Blocker			
7	(Philippines) Ma. Audrei Pagayanan	Middle Blocker			
8	(Philippines) Charlotte Tutanes (C)	Setter			
9	(Philippines) Gelah Marie Lopez	Opposite Hitter			
10	(Philippines) Angeliz Cate Cosme	Outside Hitter			
12	(Philippines) Jennifer Bacud	Libero			
13	(Philippines) Ednelle Maniquis	Outside Hitter			
14	(Philippines) Angel Mae Habacon	Outside Hitter			
15	(Philippines) Andrea Bernal	Middle Blocker			
18	(Philippines) Gina Espina	Setter			
19	(Philippines) Sophie Cagalawan	Outside Hitter			
	(Philippines) Samantha Catamora	Middle Blocker			
	(Philippines) Jem San Juan	Outside Hitter			
	(Philippines) Marjorie Orpilla	Outside Hitter			
	(Philippines) Jara Aleya Catoto	Outside Hitter			
	(Philippines) Cara Leunice Tamon	Setter			
	(Philippines) Jan Erika Morillo	Setter			

== Honors ==
=== Team ===
MPVA season	Title	Ref.
2023	Runner-Up	
2024	7th place	

=== Individual ===
MPVA Season	Award	Name	Ref.
2023	2nd Best Outside Spiker	Angel Mae Habacon	
2023	2nd Best Middle Blocker	Christine Joy Apan	
2023	Best Opposite Spiker	Reyann Cañete	

== Team captain ==
- (Philippines) Charlotte Tutanes (2023-present)

== Head coach ==
- (Philippines) Edgar Barroga (2023)
- (Philippines) Jessie Barroga (2024-present)
