= Rizal St. Gerrard Charity Foundation =

Filipino women's volleyball team

- Short name: Rizal
- Nickname: St. Gerrard Dragons
- Founded: 2023
- Dissolved: 2024
- Owner: Local Government of Rizal
- League: Maharlika Pilipinas Volleyball Association
- 2024 MPVA season: 3rd place

Rizal St. Gerrard Charity Foundation is a Filipino developmental women's volleyball team based in the province of Rizal. The team competes in the Maharlika Pilipinas Volleyball Association (MPVA) as one of four teams based in the Calabarzon region. The team plays their home games at Ynares Center in Antipolo.

The team was established in 2023 as one of the MPVA's charter teams and initially went by the Rizal Golden Coolers, being the women's volleyball counterpart of the men's basketball team of the same name.

The team is owned by the Local Government of Rizal.

== History ==
The Rizal Golden Coolers were first announced as one of the charter teams of the MPVA. For the inaugural 2023 season, the Rizal Golden Coolers was captained by Venice Puzon.

Despite a second-place finish in the preliminary round, Rizal only managed to place 4th, losing to the eventual champion Bacoor City Strikers in the semifinals and later to the fifth-seeded Marikina Lady Shoemasters in the bronze medal match.

On September 12, 2024, the league announced the team's name change to Rizal St. Gerrard Charity Foundation, formally separating the team from its men's basketball counterpart.

== Final roster ==
Rizal St. Gerrard Charity Foundation
Number	Player	Position	Height	Birth date	High School
2	Angelica Blue Guzman	Libero			LPU
3	Vannesa Martin	Middle Blocker			LPU
4	Joanne De Guzman	Outside Hitter			LPU
5	Angelica Cruz	Middle Blocker			LPU
6	Janeth Tulang	Opposite Hitter			LPU
7	Marcela Rivas	Libero			LPU
8	Stacey Lopez	Outside Hitter			LPU
9	Roxie Dela Cruz	Outside Hitter			LPU
10	Venice Puzon (C)	Setter			LPU
11	Katrina Galedo	Setter			LPU
12	Joan Doguna	Outside Hitter			LPU
15	Johna Denise Dolorito	Outside Hitter			LPU
16	Hiromi Osada	Middle Blocker			LPU
19	Heart Bio	Middle Blocker			LPU
22	Ma. Cleofe Lopez	Outside Hitter			LPU
24	Angelica Cerna	Outside Hitter			
	Anamarie Perez	Outside Hitter			LPU
	Ma. Arabella Borbon	Middle Blocker			LPU
	Ashley Muschillas	Opposite Hitter			LPU
	Joana Marie Palarca				
	Andrea Jardio				

== Honors ==
=== Team ===
MPVA Season	Title	Ref.
2023	4th place	
2024	3rd place	

=== Individual ===
MPVA Season	Award	Name	Ref.
2023	Best Setter	Venice Puzon	
2023	Best Homegrown Player	Janeth Tulang	
2024	2nd Best Outside Spiker	Johna Dolorito	
2024	Best Libero	Angelica Blue Guzman	

== Team captain ==
- (Philippines) Venice Puzon (2023–2024)

== Head coach ==
- (Philippines) Cromwell Garcia (2023–2024)
