= MPVA =

MPVA may refer to:

- Ministry of Patriots and Veterans Affairs in South Korea
- Maharlika Pilipinas Volleyball Association
