= 2023 MPVA season =

Inaugural season of the Maharlika Pilipinas Volleyball Association

- Dates: Preliminary round: October 22 – November 30, 2023; Playoffs: December 2 – 21, 2023
- Teams: 8

Final positions
- Champions: Bacoor City Strikers (1st title)
- Runners-up: Negros–ICC Blue Hawks
- Third place: Marikina Lady Shoemasters
- Fourth place: Rizal Golden Coolers

Tournament awards
- MVP: Shaila Omipon (Bacoor City)
- Best Setter: Venice Puzon (Rizal)
- Best OH: Shaila Omipon (Bacoor City); Angel Habacon (Negros)
- Best MB: Razel Aldea (Bacoor City); Christine Apan (Negros)
- Best OPP: Reyann Cañete (Negros)
- Best Libero: Alyssa Eroa (Marikina)

Tournament statistics
- Matches played: 57

The 2023 MPVA season was the first overall season of the Maharlika Pilipinas Volleyball Association (MPVA). The preliminary round began on October 22, 2023, and ended on November 30, 2023. The playoffs then ran from December 2 to 21, 2023. This season featured eight teams from across the country.

The opening ceremony took place at Ynares Center in Antipolo, Rizal with a doubleheader featuring the Caloocan AM Spikers and Negros–ICC Blue Hawks in the first match, followed by the San Juan Lady Knights and Rizal Golden Coolers in the second match.

The Bacoor City Strikers won the league's inaugural championship, after defeating the Negros–ICC Blue Hawks in three matches in the Finals.

The succeeding 2024 season would be the league's first full-length season and is referred to as Season 1. To differentiate the two seasons, the 2023 season is retroactively referred to as the MPVA Inaugural Season.

== Teams ==
The inaugural season feature eight teams: six from Luzon, one from Visayas, and one from Mindanao. The league had previously announced teams based in Bulacan, Manila, and Quezon City, but all three deferred due to time constraints. Each team's roster was revealed on October 21, 2023.

=== Arenas ===
At least one gameday is played in a team's designated home arena, usually located within the home locality of the team. Nasipit, Negros, and San Juan are exceptions, as these teams are assigned home venues in non-MPVA markets.

| Arena | Team | Location | Capacity |
|---|---|---|---|
| Strike Gymnasium | Bacoor City Strikers | Bacoor, Cavite | 1,500 |
| Santa Rosa Sports Complex | Biñan Tatak Gel | Santa Rosa, Laguna | 5,700 |
| Caloocan Sports Complex | Caloocan AM Spikers | Caloocan | 2,500 |
| Marikina Sports Center | Marikina Lady Shoemasters | Marikina | 7,000 |
| Baliwag Star Arena | Nasipit Lady Spikers | Baliwag, Bulacan | 5,000 |
| Ynares Sports Arena | Negros–ICC Blue Hawks | Pasig | 3,000 |
| Ynares Center | Rizal Golden Coolers | Antipolo, Rizal | 7,400 |
| University of Perpetual Help System DALTA | San Juan Lady Knights | Las Piñas | N/A |
| Arellano University School of Law | —N/a | Manila | N/A |
| Lyceum of the Philippines University | —N/a | Manila | N/A |

=== Roster regulations ===
The league has a set of roster regulations, putting restrictions on which and how many players and which players each team can place onto its roster. The initial roster regulations are as follows:

- All players must at least eighteen (18) years old or above to be able to join a team.
- Each team must have at least three homegrown players – local players who are native to their team's home locality.
- Each team is limited to three ex-professional players – players with prior participation in professional leagues such as the defunct Philippine Super Liga or Premier Volleyball League.

== Preliminary round ==
The preliminary round began on October 22, 2023, with the opening ceremonies at the Ynares Center in Antipolo, Rizal. It was divided into two stages: the round-robin stage and the group stage. In the round-robin stage, all eight teams play one game against all other teams. In the group stage, two groups of four teams were formed, from there a round-robin format is then used for each group. In each gameday, a set of games are played in a team's homecourt, with the final game often featuring the designated home team.

=== Pool standing procedure ===
- First, teams are ranked by the number of match points, wherein:
  - Match won 3–0 or 3–1: 3 match points for the winner, 0 match points for the loser.
  - Match won 3–2: 2 match points for the winner, 1 match point for the loser.
- In case of any ties, the following criteria shall be used:
1. Win-loss record
2. Set ratio: number of sets won divided by number of sets lost.
3. Setpoint ratio: number of points scored divided by number of points allowed.
4. Head-to-head standings: any remaining tied teams are ranked based on the results of head-to-head matches involving the teams in question.

=== Standings ===
| Pos | Grp | Team | Pld | W | L | Pts | SW | SL | SR | SPW | SPL | SPR | Qualification |
|---|---|---|---|---|---|---|---|---|---|---|---|---|---|
| 1 | A | Negros–ICC Blue Hawks | 10 | 9 | 1 | 27 | 29 | 8 | 3.625 | 871 | 659 | 1.322 | Twice-to-beat in Quarterfinals |
| 2 | B | Rizal Golden Coolers | 10 | 8 | 2 | 23 | 26 | 12 | 2.167 | 989 | 797 | 1.241 | Twice-to-beat in Quarterfinals |
| 3 | A | Bacoor City Strikers | 10 | 6 | 4 | 17 | 23 | 18 | 1.278 | 914 | 854 | 1.070 | Twice-to-beat in Quarterfinals |
| 4 | B | Nasipit Lady Spikers | 10 | 4 | 6 | 14 | 17 | 21 | 0.810 | 855 | 823 | 1.039 | Twice-to-beat in Quarterfinals |
| 5 | A | Marikina Lady Shoemasters | 10 | 4 | 6 | 13 | 19 | 23 | 0.826 | 901 | 918 | 0.981 | Twice-to-win in Quarterfinals |
| 6 | B | Caloocan AM Spikers | 10 | 3 | 7 | 10 | 14 | 25 | 0.560 | 805 | 889 | 0.906 | Twice-to-win in Quarterfinals |
| 7 | A | Biñan Tatak Gel | 10 | 3 | 7 | 9 | 14 | 25 | 0.560 | 780 | 908 | 0.859 | Twice-to-win in Quarterfinals |
| 8 | B | San Juan Lady Knights | 10 | 3 | 7 | 7 | 15 | 25 | 0.600 | 880 | 946 | 0.930 | Twice-to-win in Quarterfinals |

Rules for classification: Pool standing procedure

=== Results table ===
Legend
| Won in 3/4 sets | Lost in 3/4 sets |
| Won in 5 sets | Lost in 5 sets |
**Bold** indicates home match

2023 MPVA season results table
| Team | Match | | | | | | | | | |
| Team | 1 | 2 | 3 | 4 | 5 | 6 | 7 | 8 | 9 | 10 |
|---|---|---|---|---|---|---|---|---|---|---|
| Bacoor City (BCR) | **NAS**; **1–3** | **RZL**; **2–3** | **NEG**; **3–2** | **BIN**; **3–1** | MAR; 3–1 | SJ; 3–0 | CAL; 3–1 | BIN; 3–2 | NEG; 1–3 | MAR; 1–3 |
| Biñan (BIN) | CAL; 3–2 | BCR; 1–3 | **NAS**; **0–3** | RZL; 0–3 | NEG; 1–3 | MAR; 1–3 | SJ; 3–1 | BCR; 2–3 | MAR; 3–1 | NEG; 0–3 |
| Caloocan (CAL) | NEG; 0–3 | MAR; 3–2 | BIN; 2–3 | SJ; 0–3 | NAS; 1–3 | RZL; 2–3 | BCR; 0–3 | **RZL**; **0–3** | **NAS**; **3–1** | SJ; 3–1 |
| Marikina (MAR) | CAL; 2–3 | NAS; 3–2 | SJ; 3–1 | BCR; 1–3 | **RZL**; **1–3** | **BIN**; **3–1** | NEG; 0–3 | NEG; 2–3 | BIN; 1–3 | BCR; 3–1 |
| Nasipit (NAS) | BCR; 3–1 | MAR; 2–3 | SJ; 2–3 | BIN; 3–0 | **NEG**; **0–3** | **CAL**; **3–1** | RZL; 0–3 | SJ; 3–1 | CAL; 1–3 | RZL; 0–3 |
| Negros (NEG) | CAL; 3–0 | BCR; 2–3 | RZL; 3–0 | NAS; 3–0 | BIN; 3–1 | SJ; 3–1 | MAR; 3–0 | MAR; 3–2 | **BCR**; **3–1** | BIN; 3–0 |
| Rizal (RZL) | **SJ**; **3–1** | BCR; 3–2 | NEG; 0–3 | BIN; 3–0 | MAR; 3–1 | CAL; 3–2 | **NAS**; **3–0** | CAL; 3–0 | SJ; 2–3 | NAS; 3–0 |
| San Juan (SJ) | RZL; 1–3 | NAS; 3–2 | MAR; 1–3 | CAL; 3–0 | BCR; 0–3 | NEG; 1–3 | BIN; 1–3 | NAS; 1–3 | RZL; 3–2 | **CAL**; **1–3** |

=== Match results ===
The team abbreviation in parentheses indicate the designated home team for that gameday. Arenas in italics indicate games that are played in non-MPVA markets.

==== Round-robin stage ====
| Date | Time | Venue | | Score | | Set 1 | Set 2 | Set 3 | Set 4 | Set 5 | Total | Report |
|---|---|---|---|---|---|---|---|---|---|---|---|---|
| Oct. 22 | 03:30 pm | Ynares Center (RZL) | Caloocan AM Spikers | 0–3 | **Negros–ICC Blue Hawks** | 23–25 | 16–25 | 19–25 | — | — | 58–75 | |
| Oct. 22 | 06:00 pm | Ynares Center (RZL) | San Juan Lady Knights | 1–3 | **Rizal Golden Coolers** | 27–29 | 25–23 | 19–25 | 24–26 | — | 95–103 | |
| Oct. 25 | 03:30 pm | Strike Gymnasium (BCR) | **Caloocan AM Spikers** | 3–2 | Marikina Lady Shoemasters | 23–25 | 25–19 | 25–20 | 23–25 | 15–13 | 111–102 | |
| Oct. 25 | 06:00 pm | Strike Gymnasium (BCR) | **Nasipit Lady Spikers** | 3–1 | Bacoor City Strikers | 25–21 | 25–19 | 23–25 | 25–16 | — | 98–81 | |
| Oct. 26 | 03:30 pm | Strike Gymnasium (BCR) | **Marikina Lady Shoemasters** | 3–2 | Nasipit Lady Spikers | 22–25 | 25–21 | 25–18 | 28–30 | 15–12 | 115–106 | |
| Oct. 26 | 06:00 pm | Strike Gymnasium (BCR) | Bacoor City Strikers | 2–3 | **Rizal Golden Coolers** | 25–23 | 25–15 | 27–29 | 24–26 | 9–15 | 110–108 | |
| Nov. 4 | 01:00 pm | Strike Gymnasium (BCR) | **Biñan Tatak Gel** | 3–2 | Caloocan AM Spikers | 19–25 | 21–25 | 25–23 | 25–22 | 15–10 | 105–105 | |
| Nov. 4 | 03:30 pm | Strike Gymnasium (BCR) | Nasipit Lady Spikers | 2–3 | **San Juan Lady Knights** | 26–28 | 25–16 | 26–24 | 23–25 | 13–15 | 113–108 | |
| Nov. 4 | 06:00 pm | Strike Gymnasium (BCR) | Negros–ICC Blue Hawks | 2–3 | **Bacoor City Strikers** | 25–17 | 25–23 | 16–25 | 20–25 | 14–16 | 100–106 | |
| Nov. 5 | 03:30 pm | Strike Gymnasium (BCR) | **Marikina Lady Shoemasters** | 3–1 | San Juan Lady Knights | 24–26 | 25–17 | 25–17 | 25–19 | — | 99–79 | |
| Nov. 5 | 06:00 pm | Strike Gymnasium (BCR) | Biñan Tatak Gel | 1–3 | **Bacoor City Strikers** | 15–25 | 20–25 | 26–24 | 14–25 | — | 75–99 | |
| Nov. 8 | 10:00 am | Santa Rosa Sports Complex (BIN) | Caloocan AM Spikers | 0–3 | **San Juan Lady Knights** | 24–26 | 24–26 | 14–25 | — | — | 62–77 | |
| Nov. 8 | 12:30 pm | Santa Rosa Sports Complex (BIN) | Marikina Lady Shoemasters | 1–3 | **Bacoor City Strikers** | 17–25 | 16–25 | 25–16 | 21–25 | — | 79–91 | |
| Nov. 8 | 03:00 pm | Santa Rosa Sports Complex (BIN) | Rizal Golden Coolers | 0–3 | **Negros–ICC Blue Hawks** | 24–26 | 26–28 | 22–25 | — | — | 72–79 | |
| Nov. 8 | 05:30 pm | Santa Rosa Sports Complex (BIN) | Biñan Tatak Gel | 0–3 | **Nasipit Lady Spikers** | 10–25 | 15–25 | 11–25 | — | — | 36–75 | |
| Nov. 11 | 03:30 pm | Baliwag Star Arena (NAS) | **Rizal Golden Coolers** | 3–0 | Biñan Tatak Gel | 25–16 | 25–16 | 25–20 | — | — | 75–52 | |
| Nov. 11 | 06:00 pm | Baliwag Star Arena (NAS) | **Negros–ICC Blue Hawks** | 3–0 | Nasipit Lady Spikers | 25–21 | 25–16 | 25–20 | — | — | 75–57 | |
| Nov. 12 | 03:30 pm | Baliwag Star Arena (NAS) | San Juan Lady Knights | 0–3 | **Bacoor City Strikers** | 15–25 | 22–25 | 15–25 | — | — | 52–75 | |
| Nov. 12 | 06:00 pm | Baliwag Star Arena (NAS) | **Nasipit Lady Spikers** | 3–1 | Caloocan AM Spikers | 25–17 | 25–16 | 22–25 | 25–13 | — | 97–71 | |
| Nov. 15 | 03:30 pm | Marikina Sports Center (MAR) | Biñan Tatak Gel | 1–3 | **Negros–ICC Blue Hawks** | 14–25 | 25–23 | 23–25 | 24–26 | — | 86–99 | |
| Nov. 15 | 06:00 pm | Marikina Sports Center (MAR) | Marikina Lady Shoemasters | 1–3 | **Rizal Golden Coolers** | 25–16 | 16–25 | 24–26 | 18–25 | — | 83–92 | |
| Nov. 16 | 01:00 pm | Marikina Sports Center (MAR) | **Negros–ICC Blue Hawks** | 3–1 | San Juan Lady Knights | 25–22 | 25–23 | 21–25 | 25–21 | — | 96–91 | |
| Nov. 16 | 03:30 pm | Marikina Sports Center (MAR) | **Rizal Golden Coolers** | 3–2 | Caloocan AM Spikers | 25–27 | 25–22 | 25–17 | 21–25 | 15–11 | 111–102 | |
| Nov. 16 | 06:00 pm | Marikina Sports Center (MAR) | Biñan Tatak Gel | 1–3 | **Marikina Lady Shoemasters** | 25–21 | 14–25 | 16–25 | 20–25 | — | 75–96 | |
| Nov. 19 | 10:30 am | Ynares Center (RZL) | **Bacoor City Strikers** | 3–0 | Caloocan AM Spikers | 25–19 | 25–15 | 25–15 | — | — | 75–49 | |
| Nov. 19 | 01:00 pm | Ynares Center (RZL) | **Biñan Tatak Gel** | 3–1 | San Juan Lady Knights | 14–25 | 25–21 | 32–30 | 26–24 | — | 97–100 | |
| Nov. 19 | 03:30 pm | Ynares Center (RZL) | **Negros–ICC Blue Hawks** | 3–0 | Marikina Lady Shoemasters | 25–20 | 25–18 | 25–21 | — | — | 75–59 | |
| Nov. 19 | 06:00 pm | Ynares Center (RZL) | Nasipit Lady Spikers | 0–3 | **Rizal Golden Coolers** | 12–25 | 19–25 | 25–27 | — | — | 56–77 | |

==== Group stage ====
| Date | Time | Venue | | Score | | Set 1 | Set 2 | Set 3 | Set 4 | Set 5 | Total | Report |
|---|---|---|---|---|---|---|---|---|---|---|---|---|
| Nov. 22 | 01:00 pm | Caloocan Sports Complex (CAL) | **Nasipit Lady Spikers** | 3–1 | San Juan Lady Knights | 25–20 | 25–22 | 24–26 | 25–17 | — | 99–85 | |
| Nov. 22 | 03:30 pm | Caloocan Sports Complex (CAL) | Marikina Lady Shoemasters | 2–3 | **Negros–ICC Blue Hawks** | 25–14 | 17–25 | 25–21 | 17–25 | 12–15 | 96–100 | |
| Nov. 22 | 06:00 pm | Caloocan Sports Complex (CAL) | **Rizal Golden Coolers** | 3–0 | Caloocan AM Spikers | 25–20 | 25–17 | 25–9 | — | — | 75–46 | |
| Nov. 23 | 01:00 pm | Caloocan Sports Complex (CAL) | **Bacoor City Strikers** | 3–2 | Biñan Tatak Gel | 25–21 | 25–22 | 18–25 | 22–25 | 15–10 | 105–103 | |
| Nov. 23 | 03:30 pm | Caloocan Sports Complex (CAL) | **San Juan Lady Knights** | 3–2 | Rizal Golden Coolers | 21–25 | 25–22 | 20–25 | 25–16 | 15–11 | 106–99 | |
| Nov. 23 | 06:00 pm | Caloocan Sports Complex (CAL) | **Caloocan AM Spikers** | 3–1 | Nasipit Lady Spikers | 25–18 | 23–25 | 25–21 | 25–22 | — | 98–86 | |
| Nov. 26 | 01:00 pm | Ynares Sports Arena (NEG) | **Rizal Golden Coolers** | 3–0 | Nasipit Lady Spikers | 25–22 | 25–21 | 27–25 | — | — | 77–68 | |
| Nov. 26 | 03:30 pm | Ynares Sports Arena (NEG) | **Biñan Tatak Gel** | 3–1 | Marikina Lady Shoemasters | 23–25 | 25–18 | 25–15 | 25–21 | — | 98–79 | |
| Nov. 26 | 06:00 pm | Ynares Sports Arena (NEG) | **Negros–ICC Blue Hawks** | 3–1 | Bacoor City Strikers | 22–25 | 25–20 | 25–14 | 25–22 | — | 97–81 | |
| Nov. 30 | 01:00 pm | UPHSD Las Piñas (SJ) | Bacoor City Strikers | 1–3 | **Marikina Lady Shoemasters** | 20–25 | 22–25 | 25–17 | 24–26 | — | 91–93 | |
| Nov. 30 | 03:30 pm | UPHSD Las Piñas (SJ) | Biñan Tatak Gel | 0–3 | **Negros–ICC Blue Hawks** | 17–25 | 22–25 | 14–25 | — | — | 53–75 | |
| Nov. 30 | 06:00 pm | UPHSD Las Piñas (SJ) | **Caloocan AM Spikers** | 3–1 | San Juan Lady Knights | 28–30 | 25–17 | 25–17 | 25–20 | — | 103–84 | |

== Playoffs ==
The playoffs began on December 2, 2023.

All eight teams automatically qualify for a three-round, single-elimination playoffs. In the Quarterfinals, the top four teams are given a twice-to-beat advantage, requiring them to only win one game to advance while their opponents must win two games. A best-of-three format will then be used for the Semifinals and Finals. Alongside the Finals for the winning teams of the Semifinals, there will also be a best-of-three Bronze Medal Match between the losing teams of the Semifinals.

=== Bracket ===
Quarterfinals (Twice-to-beat)
1 | Negros | 3 | –
8 | San Juan | 0 | –
4 | Nasipit | 2 | 1
5 | Marikina | 3 | 3
2 | Rizal | 3 | –
7 | Biñan | 0 | –
3 | Bacoor City | 3 | –
6 | Caloocan | 1 | –

Semifinals (Best-of-3)
1 | Negros | 1 | 3 | 3
5 | Marikina | 3 | 2 | 0
2 | Rizal | 3 | 0 | 1
3 | Bacoor City | 2 | 3 | 3

Finals (Best-of-3)
1 | Negros | 1 | 3 | 0
3 | Bacoor City | 3 | 1 | 3
Bronze Medal Match (Best-of-3)
5 | Marikina | 3 | 2 | 3
2 | Rizal | 0 | 3 | 2

=== Quarterfinals ===
(1) Negros–ICC Blue Hawks vs. (8) San Juan Lady Knights

| Date | Time | Venue | | Score | | Set 1 | Set 2 | Set 3 | Set 4 | Set 5 | Total | Report |
|---|---|---|---|---|---|---|---|---|---|---|---|---|
| Dec. 2 | 06:00 pm | UPHSD Las Piñas | (1) Negros–ICC Blue Hawks | 3–0 | (8) San Juan Lady Knights | 25–22 | 25–20 | 25–22 | — | — | 75–64 | |

(2) Rizal Golden Coolers vs. (7) Biñan Tatak Gel

| Date | Time | Venue | | Score | | Set 1 | Set 2 | Set 3 | Set 4 | Set 5 | Total | Report |
|---|---|---|---|---|---|---|---|---|---|---|---|---|
| Dec. 2 | 01:00 pm | UPHSD Las Piñas | (2) Rizal Golden Coolers | 3–0 | (7) Biñan Tatak Gel | 25–22 | 25–19 | 25–16 | — | — | 75–57 | |

(3) Bacoor City Strikers vs. (6) Caloocan AM Spikers

| Date | Time | Venue | | Score | | Set 1 | Set 2 | Set 3 | Set 4 | Set 5 | Total | Report |
|---|---|---|---|---|---|---|---|---|---|---|---|---|
| Dec. 2 | 03:30 pm | UPHSD Las Piñas | (3) Bacoor City Strikers | 3–1 | (6) Caloocan AM Spikers | 25–15 | 25–22 | 20–25 | 25–14 | — | 95–76 | |

(4) Nasipit Lady Spikers vs. (5) Marikina Lady Shoemasters

| Date | Time | Venue | | Score | | Set 1 | Set 2 | Set 3 | Set 4 | Set 5 | Total | Report |
|---|---|---|---|---|---|---|---|---|---|---|---|---|
| Dec. 2 | 10:00 am | UPHSD Las Piñas | (4) Nasipit Lady Spikers | 2–3 | (5) Marikina Lady Shoemasters | 25–27 | 23–25 | 25–21 | 25–21 | 12–15 | 110–109 | |
| Dec. 6 | 01:00 pm | AU School of Law | (4) Nasipit Lady Spikers | 1–3 | (5) Marikina Lady Shoemasters | 25–22 | 21–25 | 17–25 | 21–25 | — | 84–97 | |

=== Semifinals ===
(1) Negros–ICC Blue Hawks vs. (5) Marikina Lady Shoemasters

| Date | Time | Venue | | Score | | Set 1 | Set 2 | Set 3 | Set 4 | Set 5 | Total | Report |
|---|---|---|---|---|---|---|---|---|---|---|---|---|
| Dec. 9 | 03:30 pm | LPU Manila | (1) Negros–ICC Blue Hawks | 1–3 | (5) Marikina Lady Shoemasters | 19–25 | 25–27 | 25–15 | 25–27 | — | 94–94 | |
| Dec. 10 | 06:00 pm | UPHSD Las Piñas | (5) Marikina Lady Shoemasters | 2–3 | (1) Negros–ICC Blue Hawks | 24–26 | 25–23 | 19–25 | 27–25 | 12–15 | 107–114 | |
| Dec. 13 | 03:30 pm | Ynares Center | (1) Negros–ICC Blue Hawks | 3–0 | (5) Marikina Lady Shoemasters | 25–21 | 25–16 | 25–19 | — | — | 75–56 | |

(2) Rizal Golden Coolers vs. (3) Bacoor City Strikers

| Date | Time | Venue | | Score | | Set 1 | Set 2 | Set 3 | Set 4 | Set 5 | Total | Report |
|---|---|---|---|---|---|---|---|---|---|---|---|---|
| Dec. 9 | 06:00 pm | LPU Manila | (2) Rizal Golden Coolers | 3–2 | (3) Bacoor City Strikers | 26–28 | 16–25 | 25–22 | 25–21 | 15–11 | 107–107 | |
| Dec. 10 | 03:30 pm | UPHSD Las Piñas | (3) Bacoor City Strikers | 3–0 | (2) Rizal Golden Coolers | 25–18 | 25–12 | 25–22 | — | — | 75–52 | |
| Dec. 13 | 06:00 pm | Ynares Center | (2) Rizal Golden Coolers | 1–3 | (3) Bacoor City Strikers | 25–20 | 17–25 | 22–25 | 15–25 | – | 79–95 | |

=== Bronze Medal Match ===
| Date | Time | Venue | | Score | | Set 1 | Set 2 | Set 3 | Set 4 | Set 5 | Total | Report |
|---|---|---|---|---|---|---|---|---|---|---|---|---|
| Dec. 16 | 02:00 pm | Ynares Sports Arena | (5) Marikina Lady Shoemasters | 3–0 | (2) Rizal Golden Coolers | 25–19 | 25–16 | 25–21 | — | — | 75–56 | |
| Dec. 19 | 02:00 pm | Strike Gymnasium | (2) Rizal Golden Coolers | 3–2 | (5) Marikina Lady Shoemasters | 25–21 | 19–25 | 22–25 | 25–17 | 15–13 | 106–101 | |
| Dec. 21 | 02:00 pm | Ynares Center | (5) Marikina Lady Shoemasters | 3–2 | (2) Rizal Golden Coolers | 18–25 | 25–9 | 22–25 | 25–22 | 15–13 | 105–94 | |

=== Finals ===
| Date | Time | Venue | | Score | | Set 1 | Set 2 | Set 3 | Set 4 | Set 5 | Total | Report |
|---|---|---|---|---|---|---|---|---|---|---|---|---|
| Dec. 16 | 05:00 pm | Ynares Sports Arena | (3) Bacoor City Strikers | 3–1 | (1) Negros–ICC Blue Hawks | 25–17 | 25–13 | 23–25 | 25–22 | — | 98–77 | |
| Dec. 19 | 05:00 pm | Strike Gymnasium | (1) Negros–ICC Blue Hawks | 3–1 | (3) Bacoor City Strikers | 25–18 | 12–25 | 25–22 | 25–23 | — | 87–88 | |
| Dec. 21 | 05:00 pm | Ynares Center | (3) Bacoor City Strikers | 3–0 | (1) Negros–ICC Blue Hawks | 28–26 | 25–14 | 25–23 | — | — | 78–63 | |

== Final standings ==
| Rank | Team |
|---|---|
| 1st place, gold medalist(s) | Bacoor City Strikers |
| 2nd place, silver medalist(s) | Negros–ICC Blue Hawks |
| 3rd place, bronze medalist(s) | Marikina Lady Shoemasters |
| 4 | Rizal Golden Coolers |
| 5 | Nasipit Lady Spikers |
| 6 | Caloocan AM Spikers |
| 7 | Biñan Tatak Gel |
| 8 | San Juan Lady Knights |

2023 MPVA season champions
Bacoor City Strikers
1st title

Team roster
Razel Paula Aldea (c), Mary Rhose Dapol, Daizerlyn Uy, Winnie Bedana, Shaila Omipon, Mikayla Mindanao, Fianne Ariola, Cyrielle Alemeniana, Maria Theresa Salvador, Charmaine Ocado, Krisha Cordero, Maxine Abliter, Alexandra Rafael, Charisse Enrico, Jhasmine Sapin, Joanne Lozano, Nicollete Gaa, Jazhryl Lagmay, Krimillen Villar
Head coach
Sandy Rieta

== Awards and medalists ==
=== Individual awards ===
| Award | Player | Team | Ref. |
|---|---|---|---|
| Most Valuable Player | Shaila Omipon | Bacoor City | |
| 1st Best Outside Spiker | Shaila Omipon | Bacoor City | |
| 2nd Best Outside Spiker | Angel Mae Habacon | Negros | |
| 1st Best Middle Blocker | Razel Aldea | Bacoor City | |
| 2nd Best Middle Blocker | Christine Joy Apan | Negros | |
| Best Opposite Spiker | Reyann Cañete | Negros | |
| Best Setter | Venice Puzon | Rizal | |
| Best Libero | Alyssa Eroa | Marikina | |
| Best Homegrown Player | Janeth Tulang | Rizal | |

=== Medalists ===
| Gold | Silver | Bronze |
|---|---|---|
| Bacoor City Strikers: Razel Paula Aldea (c); Mary Rhose Dapol; Daizerlyn Uy; Winnie Bedana; Shaila Omipon; Mikayla Mindanao; Fianne Ariola; Cyrielle Alemeniana; Maria Theresa Salvador; Charmaine Ocado; Krisha Cordero; Maxine Abliter; Alexandra Rafael; Charisse Enrico; Jhasmine Sapin; Joanne Lozano; Nicollete Gaa; Jazhryl Lagmay; Krimillen Villar Head Coach: Sandy Rieta | Negros–ICC Blue Hawks: Charlotte Tutanes (c); Andrea Caparal; Irish Besmonte; Reyann Cañete; Christine Joy Apan; Ma. Audrei Pagayanan; Gelah Marie Lopez; Angeli Cate Cosme; Jennifer Bacud; Ednelle Maniquis; Angel Mae Habacon; Andrea Bernal; Gina Espina; Sophie Cagalawan; Samantha Catamora; Jem San Juan; Marjorie Orpilla; Jara Aleya Catoto; Cara Leunice Tamon; Jan Erika Morillo Head Coach: Edgar Barroga | Marikina Lady Shoemasters: Shannen Palec (c); Toni Rose Nitura; Jeulyanna Ferrer; Maria Victoria Pascual; Vira May Guillema; Angelica Dacaymat; Melanie Romero; Sheena Mae Copitea; Justine Rebleza; Ankhrisia Lero; Alyza Desiderio; Caryl Sandoval; Sydney Niegos; Karla Concepcion; Alyssa Eroa; Mary Joy Onofre; Grenlen Malapit; Eloiza Balmedina Head Coach: Andy Fiel |

== Media coverage ==
All games are aired on Media Pilipinas TV (MPTV) on television. For streaming, Cignal TV streams all of the games on its Pilipinas Live service. On social media, Plus Network broadcasts the games across all of its pages as well as on the MPVA's Facebook page.

== See also ==
- 2023 Premier Volleyball League season
- 2023 Spikers' Turf season
