= Mycah Go =

Filipino volleyball player (born 2002)

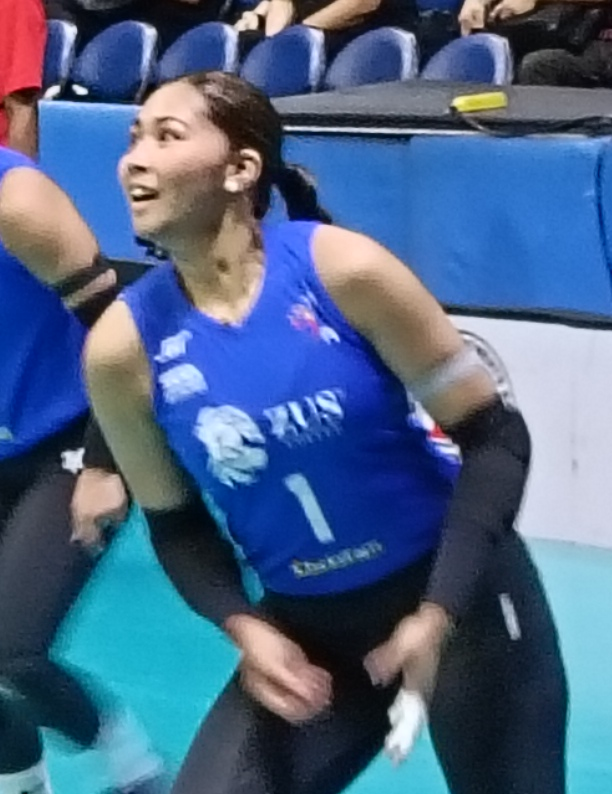
- Go in 2025

Personal information
- Full name: Francis Mycah Go
- Nationality: Filipino
- Born: April 15, 2002 (age 24)
- Hometown: Bogo City, Cebu, Philippines
- Height: 1.70 m (5 ft 7 in)
- Education: De La Salle College of Saint Benilde

Volleyball information
- Position: Outside Hitter
- Current club: Zus Coffee Thunderbelles

Career
| Years | Teams |
|---|---|
| 2024 | Quezon Tangerines |
| 2025–present | Zus Coffee Thunderbelles |

Francis Mycah Go (born April 15, 2002) is a Filipino professional volleyball player. She played for the Benilde Lady Blazers in the NCAA. She is currently playing for the Zus Coffee Thunderbelles in the Premier Volleyball League (PVL).

== Career ==
=== College ===
Go played for the Lady Blazers of the De La Salle College of Saint Benilde in the National Collegiate Athletic Association (NCAA).

She didn't play for the Lady Blazers in NCAA Season 98 after she suffered an injury in the practice before the tournament started.

She came back to play with the Lady Blazers in NCAA Season 99, where she helped the team reached their 3 peat championship crown.

She ended her stint with Lady Blazers in Season 100, where they get their 4 peat championship crown and she bagged her Season and Finals MVP award.

=== Clubs ===
Before the conclusion NCAA Season 100, she applied to join the 2025 PVL rookie draft where she was picked by Zus Coffee Thunderbelles in the in 2nd round of draft.

== Awards ==
=== Individual ===
| Year | League | Season/Conference | Award | Ref |
|---|---|---|---|---|
| 2022 | NCAA | 97 | Season's MVP | |
| 2022 | NCAA | 97 | 1st Best OH | |
| 2025 | NCAA | 100 | Season's MVP | |
| 2025 | NCAA | 100 | Finals MVP | |
| 2025 | NCAA | 100 | 1st Best OH | |

=== Collegiate ===
==== Benilde Lady Blazers ====
| Year | League | Season/Conference | Title | Ref |
|---|---|---|---|---|
| 2022 | NCAA | 97 | Champions | |
| 2022 | V-League | Collegiate | 3rd place | |
| 2024 | NCAA | 99 | Champions | |
| 2025 | NCAA | 100 | Champions | |

=== Clubs ===
| Year | League | Season/Conference | Club | Title | Ref |
|---|---|---|---|---|---|
| 2024 | MPVA | | Quezon Tangerines | Champions | |
| 2025 | PVL | Reinforced | Zus Coffee Thunderbelles | Runner-up | |
