= 2022 V-League Collegiate Challenge squads =

This article shows the team roster of all participating teams at the 2022 V-League Collegiate Challenge.

== Men's division ==
=== Pool A ===
==== Adamson Soaring Falcons ====
Head Coach: George Pascua

- 1 Alegre, Grant Carlo S
- 2 Canlas, Lorence L
- 4 Takeda, Jhon Maru L
- 5 Mirador, Aaron MB (c)
- 6 Pacquing, Ned Calvert OH
- 7 Gudoy, Jadewin OH
- 8 Coguimbal, Mark Leo MB
- 9 De Lare, Mar Angelo MB
- 10 Canlas, Francis OH
- 11 Tropia, JM OH
- 12 Paulino, Marc Kenneth OH
- 13 Aguilar, Jude Christian OP
- 14 Gay, John Eugenio OP
- 15 Magalaman, Joshua MB
- 16 Novillo, Evander OH

==== Arellano Chiefs ====
Head Coach: Sherwin Meneses

- 1 Encila, Ivan OH
- 2 Guinto, Arman Clarence OH
- 3 Tuazon, John Marphi OP
- 4 Curamen, Anfernee MB
- 5 Berdal, Carl Justin OH
- 6 Villados, Adrian S
- 7 Lapuz, Demy Freedom OP
- 8 Cabillan, Jethro Jasper MB (c)
- 9 Saksena, Ismael OH
- 10 Delos Santos, James Paul OP
- 11 Datu, Joshua L
- 12 Caunan, Christopher Mark OH
- 13 Tan, Kim Vincent OH
- 14 Domingo, Ralph MB
- 15 Dela Paz, Christian OH
- 16 Orpilla, Exequel MB
- 17 Aure, Dan Mapy L
- 18 Bustillo, Melchor S

==== Benilde Blazers ====
Head Coach: Ajian Dy

- 1 Fajardo, Jericho Paolo S
- 2 Adviento, Roniey OH
- 3 Tero, John Carlo MB
- 5 Daculan, Ryan MB
- 6 Valera, Reiven Kyle OP
- 7 Aguilar, Arnel Christian OH
- 8 Jordan, Gio Ronald MB
- 11 Gabuyan, Baron OH
- 12 Montimor, Deon Fitzgerald L
- 13 Dumaran, Bryan L
- 15 Guani, Georgie OH
- 16 Gomez, Alvin Bryle S
- 17 Laguit James Paul MB
- Colesio, Harold OH
- Ilano, Diego Felipe OP

==== De La Salle Green Spikers ====
Head Coach: Arnold Laniog

- 1 Ronquillo, John Mark OP
- 2 Javier, Joaquin Antonio L
- 3 Anima, Billi Jean-Henri MB
- 4 Sumalinog, John Raphael L
- 5 Marata, Von OP
- 6 Guerrero, Menard L
- 7 Encarnacion, Simon Joseph S
- 8 Poquita III, Diogenes S
- 9 Kampton, Noel Michael OH
- 10 Espejo, Andre OH
- 11 Rodriguez, Joshua Jamiel MB
- 13 Del Pilar, Nathaniel MB
- 14 Maglinao, Vince Gerard OH (c)
- 15 Layug, Eric Paolo MB
- 16 De Jesus, Jules Carlo OH

==== NU Bulldogs ====
Head Coach: Dante Alinsunurin

- 1 Almendras, Angelo Nicolas OH
- 2 Belostrino, Clarenz S
- 5 Ramones, Kyle Adrien MB
- 6 Buddin, Michaelo OH
- 8 Sumagui, Jann Mariano L
- 9 Lumanlan, Louis MB
- 10 Mukaba, Obed MB
- 11 Malinis, Kennry OP
- 13 Retamar, Ave Joshua S (c)
- 15 Maclang, Marco Ely L
- 18 Aringo, Leo JR OH
- 20 Bello, Joseph Phillip S
- 22 Fortuna, Michael Jhon OP
- 23 Diao, Jenngerard Arnfranz MB

==== UST Tiger Spikers ====
Head Coach: Arthur Alan Mamon

- 1 De Vega, Rey Miguel OH
- 2 Borra, Lawrence S
- 3 Magpayo, Charlee MB
- 4 Taman, Abdul Aziz OH
- 5 Cruz, Lorence S (c)
- 6 Dedoroy, John Emmanuel OP
- 7 Yambao, Dux Euan S
- 8 Señoron, Jhun Lorenz OP
- 9 Avila, Joshua S
- 10 Flor, Rainier MB
- 11 Umandal, Joshua OH
- 12 Sison, Rayven Camerone MB
- 13 Ybañez, Josh OH
- 14 Tajanlangit, Jesse Emmanuel L
- 15 Umandal, Sherwin OP
- 16 Colinares, Edlyn Paul MB
- 18 Prudenciado, Van Tracy L
- 21 Gupiteo, Alche OH
- 23 Kassouin, Patrick MB
- 24 Dela Noche, Jay Rack OP

=== Pool B ===
==== Ateneo Blue Eagles ====
Head Coach: Timothy Sto. Tomas Jr.

- 1 Magadia, Lawrence Gil S
- 2 Crisostomo, Leinuel OH
- 4 Gopio, Jettlee MB
- 5 Batas, Kennedy OP
- 6 Taneo, Lutrelle Andre OH
- 7 Licauco, James Daniel S
- 8 Pacinio, Amil Jr. OH
- 10 Trinidad, Paulo Lorenzo L
- 11 Llenos, Canciano OH
- 13 De Castro, Lance Andrei L (c)
- 14 Go, Emmanuel S
- 16 Almadro, Andrei John OH
- 17 Sendon, Jeric MB
- 18 Salarzon, Jian Matthew OH
- 19 Sy, Justin Jacob OP
- 21 Blomstedt, Kalle Johann Lennart OH
- 22 Absin, Charles David MB

==== FEU Tamaraws ====
Head Coach: Rey Diaz

- 1 DOMINGO, Herald MB
- 2 CODILLA, Jomel OH
- 3 CACAO, Ariel S
- 4 DE GUZMAN, Raymond Bryce L
- 6 CALADO, Mark Frederick OH
- 7 JAVELONA, Jose Magdalino OH
- 8 SABANAL, Reymond MB
- 9 SAAVEDRA, Zhydryx OP
- 10 BANAC, Mabel Jesus L
- 12 MENESES, Victor MB
- 13 SABADO, Mark Vergel OP
- 14 MARTINEZ, Benny S
- 16 ABUNIAWAN, Jefferson MB
- 23 RACAZA, France Lander OH

==== Perpetual Altas ====
Head Coach: Sinfronio Acaylar

- 1 TEODORO, Arianne Paul L
- 2 MATEO, Klint Michael OP
- 3 ENGAY, Renz OH
- 4 ZARENO, Joshua OH
- 5 MEDALLA, Michael MB
- 6 ANDRADE, Kc MB
- 7 COLANGO, Emman OP
- 8 BAGGAYAN, Jay Rick MB
- 9 CODENIERA, Sean Archer Noel OP
- 10 RAMIREZ, Leo OH
- 11 ENARCISO, John Christian S
- 12 LITUANIA, John Exequiel S
- 13 GELOGO, Kylle Andre OH
- 14 RAMIREZ, Louie OH
- 15 SIMANGAN, Bryle
- 16 ROSOS, Kirth Patrick MB
- 18 PEPITO, John Philip L
- 19 AUSTRIA, Hero OH

==== San Beda Red Spikers ====
Head Coach: Ariel dela Cruz

- 2 UMALI, John Frederico S
- 3 CALAYAG, Lorenz MB
- 4 BOOK, Axel Van OH
- 5 BAKIL, Andrie MB
- 6 LOPEZ, Jerome S (c)
- 7 MUNSING, Alener Grieg OH/MB
- 9 UMALI, Kenrod Benedict OH
- 10 CABALSA, Ralp OH
- 13 MONTEMAYOR, Mark Kevin OP
- 14 RUS, Aidjien Josh L
- 15 BUHAY, Jiacomo Ken MB
- 16 TAHILUDDIN, Mohammad Shaif Ali OP
- 17 LABRADOR, Sean Andrie Jeremy MB
- 18 ROSMAN, Ryan OH
- 21 MILJANI, Alsenal OH

==== San Sebastian Stags ====
Head Coach: Norvie Laubga

- 1 MARTIN, Marc Dominic OH
- 2 BIHAG, Marvin John L
- 3 CAGANG, Jerick S
- 4 ARAÑO, Jan Kerk S
- 5 VILLAMOR, Kyle Angelo OH
- 6 ABULENCIA, Angelo MB
- 7 MENDOZA, Mikel Rovin MB (c)
- 8 YAPE, Lheann Andrei OP
- 9 LEAL, Lorenzo Miguel L
- 10 MARCOS, Jezreel Franz OH
- 11 ESPENIDA, Joshua OP
- 12 DUGUEN, Jilbert MB
- 13 BINONDO, Frants Einstene Aaron MB
- 18 LIM, Cedric Resty OH
- 21 ALBA, Rhenmart Christian MB

==== UP Fighting Maroons ====
Head Coach: Rald Ricafort

- 1 IJIRAN, Ruskin Joss MB
- 2 GAMBAN, Louis Gaspar OH (c)
- 4 CORDERO, Dominic Ronald L
- 5 NICOLAS, Daniel MB
- 7 VELASQUEZ, Redhen Jade S
- 8 LAURETA, Shem Lois MB
- 9 LAGANDO, Angelo OH
- 10 ALBA, Angelu Leonard OP
- 11 EUSEBIO, Erl Klint OH
- 12 CAJOLO, Ranz Wesley OP
- 13 ADVINCULA, Emmanuel Izus MB
- 14 JUNTILLA, Johnlee L
- 15 MALABANAN, Jaivee OH
- 16 CHAVEZ, Brian OP
- 17 SAMANIEGO, Gian Carlo S
- 19 TUQUERO, Neuford L
- 21 LIPATA, Angelo MB
- 22 SANTIAGO, Clarence S
- 23 MERCADO, Jairo Israel L
- 24 CHENILLA, Ravanne Zhimond S

== Women's division ==
=== Pool A ===
==== Adamson Lady Falcons ====
Head Coach: Jerry Yee

- 2 LAZO, Cae Jelean L
- 4 ALCANTARA, Angelica S
- 6 NUIQUE, May Ann MB
- 7ROMERO, Louie S (c)
- 8 ADOLFO, Antonette OH
- 9 SANTIAGO, Kate NhorrylleOH
- 10 VERDEFLOR, Ma. Joahna Karen L
- 11 CRUZ, Rizza Andrea MB
- 12 TUBU, Trisha Gayle OP
- 13 TAGSIP, Aprylle Ckyle MB
- 15 JUEGOS, Ayesha Tara OP
- 16 LALONGISIP, Ma. Rochelle OH
- 17 ALMONTE, Lucille May OH
- 18 TORING, Lorene Grace MB

==== Ateneo Blue Eagles ====
Head Coach: Oliver Almadro

- 1 HORA, Gena OP
- 3 CANE, Jana MB
- 4 LICAUCO, Jean L
- 5 GANDLER, Vanessa OH
- 6 KOWALSKI, Makana S
- 7 CRUZ, Kiara L
- 8 SULIT, Yvana MB
- 9 FUJIMOTO, Takako S
- 11 TSUNASHIMA, Geezel OH
- 12 NARIT, Joan MB
- 14 MINER, Alexis MB
- 15 ILDEFONSO, Sofia OP/MB
- 16 DE GUZMAN, Lyann OH/OP
- 17 NISPEROS, Faith Shirley OH (c)
- 18 LOMOSCO, Beautiliza S
- 19 DORORMAL, Roma Mae L
- 20 NG, Briana S
- 21 BUENA, Sophia OH/OP
- 24 NISPEROS, Ysabelle OH

==== FEU Lady Tamaraws ====
Head Coach: Tina Salak

- 1 ZERNA, Shianly Colyn MB
- 2 KISEO, Shiela Mae OH/L
- 4 FERNANDEZ, Jovelyn OP
- 5 UBALDO, Christine S (c)
- 6 JUANGCO, Alexandra Maxine L
- 7 ASIS, Ann Roselle MB
- 8 GUZMAN, Angelica Blue L
- 9 TAGAOD, Chenie OH
- 10 PAPA, Florize Anne S
- 11 GALLO, Gillianne Heinz S
- 12 SAPIENZA, Maria Ysabella Francesca S
- 13 DEVOSORA, Alyzza Gaile OP
- 14 FAMULAGAN, Keshia Marie MB
- 16 TRUZ, Karyme Isabella MB
- 17 JAMILI, Jimy Jean OH
- 18 PANANGIN, Mitzi OH
- 19 ASIS, Jean MB
- 20 MONARES, Julianne OH
- 22 ENCARNACION, Margarett Louise L
- 23 REFUGIA, Maria Isabelle L

==== San Sebastian Lady Stags ====
Head Coach: Rogelio Gorayeb

- 1 SANTOS, Katherina OH
- 2 CAÑETE, Reyann OP
- 3 BERMILLO, Jewelle L
- 4 MARASIGAN, Christina OH
- 5 RAMOS, Carmella Juiliann OP
- 6 TAN, Roxanne
- 7 DOMINGO, Jasmyn L
- 8 DIONISIO, Kristine Joy MB
- 9 SISON, Alexia Vea S
- 10 TAN, Kamille Josephine Amaka MB
- 11 STA. MARIA, Hayvenae MB
- 12 LUMIBAO, Jassy Lei MB
- 14 ORDOÑA, Bianca OH
- 15 BORJA, Clarence Claire L

=== Pool B ===
==== Benilde Lady Blazers ====
Head Coach: Jerry Yee

- 1 BASARTE, Chenae S
- 2 DIZON, Cathrina MB
- 3 GAMIT, Michelle MB
- 4 ESTENZO, Kim Alison L
- 5 GETIGAN, Fiona Mae L
- 6 MONDEJAR, Angelika L
- 7 GENTAPA, Jade OH
- 8 MONDOÑEDO, Cloanne S
- 9 PASCUAL, Gayle OP
- 10 GO, Mycah OH
- 11 AVILA, Camill MB
- 12 APOSTOL, Corrine OH
- 14 ESTOQUE, Wielyn OH
- 15 MAGPATOC, Abigail MB
- 16 CATARIG, Clydel Mae OP
- 17 DOROG, Jessa OH
- 18 ONDANGAN, Cristy OP
- 19 LIMPOT, Alyzandrianne L
- 21 NOLASCO, Zamantha MB

==== San Beda Lady Red Spikers ====
Head Coach: Nemesio Gavino Jr.

- ABRAHAM, Kleineross OP
- BINONDO, Aryanna S
- CASTILLO, Chynna Allyson OH
- CASUGOD, Jaschryl MB
- CENZON, Patricia S
- FLORES, Milcah L
- GALBADORES, Koulinne
- HABACON, Angel Mae
- HADLOCON, Rea Mae
- MOLINA, Katleya OP
- PARAS, Trisha Mae MB
- SALANGSANG, Francesca MB
- TAYAG, Marianne OH
- TAYAG, Maxinne MB

==== UP Fighting Maroons ====
Head Coach: Kirk Beliran

- 1 SOTOMIL, Marianne S
- 3 YTANG, Niña MB
- 4 ALTOMEA, Remelyn L
- 5 VERGEIRE, Maria Celina OH
- 6 ARCE Ethan Lainne MB
- 7 CELIS Ma. Dannica MB
- 8 MONARES Joan Marie OH
- 9 BONAFE Theo Bea S
- 12 ENCARNACION, Jewel Hannah Ysabelle OH
- 13 OJEDA, Kirstin Louise MB
- 16 BUSTRILLO, Stephanie OP
- 18 JABONETA, Irah Anika OH
- 21 CABASAC, Kryzten Annika OP
- 25 GOC, Abilaine Ann OH

==== UST Golden Tigresses ====
Head Coach: Emilio Reyes Jr.

- 1 CORDORA, Kyla Elvi Dale OH
- 2 TAPIA, Ypril Jyrhine OH
- 3 JIMENEZ, Ysabel Jamie OH/OP
- 4 PEPITO, Ma. Bernadett L
- 5 HERNANDEZ, Imee Kim Grabriella MB
- 6 ECALLA, Mary Christine OP
- 7 VERNAIZ, Mary Grace MB
- 10 VICTORIA, Camille OP
- 11 ABBU, Athena Sopia MB
- 12 GALDONES, Kecelyn MB
- 14 ABELLANA, Pierre Angeli OH
- 16 MANGULABNAN, Ma. Regina Agatha S
- 17 DELERIO, Janel L
- 22 ALBERTO, Marilla Issabel S
- 23 HILONGO, Maribeth OP
- BACALSO, Angeli MB
- CARBALLO, Ma. Cassandra Rae S
- PERDIDO, Jonna Chris OP
