= Mayang Nuique =

Filipino volleyball player

May Ann Nuique

Personal information
- Nickname: Mayang
- Nationality: Filipino
- Born: July 20, 2002 (age 24)
- Hometown: San Pedro, Laguna, Philippines
- Height: 1.73 m (5 ft 8 in)

Volleyball information
- Position: Opposite spiker
- Current team: Nxled Chameleons

Career
Years	Teams
2024	Biñan Tatak Gel Volley Angels
2025–present	Nxled Chameleons

May Ann "Mayang" Nuique (born July 20, 2002) is a Filipino professional volleyball player who is an opposite hitter for the Capital1 Solar Spikers of the Premier Volleyball League (PVL). She played for the Adamson Lady Falcons of the University Athletic Association of the Philippines before getting picked 13th overall by the Nxled Chameleons in the 2nd round of the Premier Volleyball League draft on June 8, 2025.

== Personal life ==
Nuique attended early schooling at Mater Ecclesiae School in San Pedro City and finished senior high as a student-athlete at Adamson University in Manila.

== Volleyball career ==
=== UAAP ===
Nuique played girls' volleyball for the Adamson Lady Baby Falcons and won the First Best Middle Blocker award in Season 81.

For college volleyball, Nuique stayed in Adamson and is now a senior spiker for the rookie-laden Lady Falcons of head coach JP Yude in Season 87.

=== MPVA ===
The Maharlika Pilipinas Volleyball Association (MPVA) honored Nuique as the Best Homegrown Player on November 27, 2024. She led Biñan Tatak Gel 1 for a silver finish.

== Awards ==
=== Individuals ===
- 2024 MPVA season "Best Homegrown Player"
- 2018-2019 UAAP Season 81 Girls' Volleyball "First Best Middle Blocker"
