= Bacoor City Strikers (volleyball) =

Filipino women's volleyball team

- Short name: Bacoor City
- Nickname: Strikers
- Founded: 2023
- Dissolved: 2024
- Owner: Local Government of Bacoor
- League: Maharlika Pilipinas Volleyball Association
- 2024 MPVA season: 4th place
- Championships: Maharlika Pilipinas Volleyball Association: 1 (2023)

Uniforms
Home	Away

The Bacoor City Strikers, also known as Bacoor City Strikers – Metro Land Builders Corp. for sponsorship reasons, are a Filipino women's developmental volleyball team based in Bacoor, Cavite. The team currently competes in the Maharlika Pilipinas Volleyball Association (MPVA). The team playing their home games at Strike Gymnasium.

Owned by the Local Government of Bacoor, the team is one the league's charter teams, beginning play in the 2023 season. The team shares its name with its basketball counterpart in the Maharlika Pilipinas Basketball League (MPBL).

== History ==
=== Background ===
The Bacoor City Strikers were first announced as one of the charter teams of the MPVA. For the inaugural 2023 season, the Bacoor City Strikers is captained by Razel Paula Aldea.

=== Immediate success and first championship ===
After a slow one-point start in its first two games, Bacoor City went on to win the next six games out of the eight remaining, Led by Shaila Omipon and Razel Aldea, the Strikers clinched the third seed with 17 points on a 6–4 record to earn twice-to-beat advantage in the Quarterfinals.

In the playoffs, Bacoor City eliminated Caloocan in one match then faced second-seeded Rizal in the Semifinals. The Strikers lost match 1 in five sets but came back to win the next to matches, earning them a Finals berth against the first-seeded Negros–ICC Blue Hawks, who are ahead by 10 points. Despite the big disparity, Bacoor City took the first match with Negros taking the second. Bacoor City then won the third match in straight sets to be declared the MPVA's inaugural champions.

Despite the departure of the basketball Strikers from the MPBL, the volleyball Strikers are set to continue competing in 2024.

== Team identity ==
Like its former basketball counterpart, the team is named after Bacoor City Mayor Strike Revilla. The logo is the also the same as the basketball team.

== Final roster ==
Bacoor City Strikers roster
Number	Player	Position	Height	Birth date	High School
1	Joanne Lozano	Libero			UPHSD
2	Charisse Enrico	Middle Blocker			UPHSD
3	Winnie Bedana	Middle Blocker			UPHSD
4	Shaila Omipon	Outside Hitter			UPHSD
5	Pauline Reyes	Outside Hitter			UPHSD
6	Fianne Ariola	Setter			UPHSD
7	Cyrielle Alemeniana	Outside Hitter			UPHSD
8	Jazhryl Lagmay	Middle Blocker			
10	Ynna Nicole Hatulan	Middle Blocker			DLSU
11	Camille Bustamante	Opposite Hitter			UPHSD
12	Marian Tracy Andal (C)	Libero			UPHSD
14	Daizerlyn Uy	Middle Blocker			UPHSD
15	Jemalyn Menor	Outside Hitter			UPHSD
16	Jhasmine Sapin	Setter			UPHSD
17	Patrisha Salgado	Outside Hitter			UPHSD
18	Nicollete Gaa	Setter			
19	Maria Theresa Salvador	Opposite Hitter			
20	Maxine Abliter	Outside Hitter			UPHSD
22	Ma. Criselda Alvarez	Libero			
	Ivy Aquino	Middle Blocker			UST

== Honors ==
=== Team ===
MPVA Season	Title	Ref.
2023	Champions	
2024	4th place	

=== Individual ===
MPVA Season	Award	Name	Ref.
2023	Most Valuable Player	Shaila Omipon	
2023	1st Best Outside Spiker	Shaila Omipon	
2023	1st Best Middle Blocker	Razel Paula Aldea	

== Team captain ==
- (Philippines) Razel Paula Aldea (2023)
- (Philippines) Marian Tracy Andal (2024)

== Head coach ==
- (Philippines) Sandy Rieta (2023–2024)
