= Quezon Tangerines =

Filipino women's volleyball team

- Short name: Quezon
- Nickname: Tangerines
- Founded: 2024
- Owner: Local Government of Quezon
- Head coach: Rogelio Getigan
- Captain: Jessa Dorog
- League: Maharlika Pilipinas Volleyball Association
- 2025 MPVA season: 3rd place

Championships
- Maharlika Pilipinas Volleyball Association: 1 (2024)

The Quezon Tangerines are a Filipino women's developmental volleyball team based in the province of Quezon. As the volleyball counterpart of the Quezon Huskers, the team will compete in the Maharlika Pilipinas Volleyball Association (MPVA) beginning with the 2024 season.

== History ==
=== Background ===
The Quezon Tangerines, alongside the Valenzuela Classy, are one of two expansion teams that will join the MPVA for the league's second season. The team's inaugural roster is mostly composed of players from the Benilde Lady Blazers. Rogelio Getigan will be the team's first head coach.

== Current roster ==
Quezon Tangerines
Number	Player	Position	Height	Birth date	High School
1	Chenae Basarte	Setter			CSB
2	Shekaina Rhedge Lleses	Outside Hitter			CSB
3	Shahanna Rheign Lleses	Outside Hitter			CSB
5	Fiona Marie Getigan	Libero			CSB
6	Zen Reina Basilio	Setter			CSB
9	Rhea Mae Densing	Outside Hitter			CSB
10	Mycah Ramos Go	Outside Hitter			CSB
11	Sophia Margarette Badion	Middle Blocker			CSB
14	Amaka Tan	Middle Blocker			
15	Fionna Marie Inocentes	Middle Blocker			CSB
16	Alyzandrianne Limpot	Outside Hitter			
17	Jessa Dorog (C)	Libero			CSB
18	Cristy Ondangan	Opposite Hitter			CSB
19	Mary Grace Borromeo	Outside Hitter			CSB
20	Lenie Rose Sapallo	Outside Hitter			
	Kim Alison Estenzo	Libero			CSB
	Francis Mae Flores	Outside Hitter			CSB
	Franceska Faye Delgado	Middle Blocker			CSB
	Corrine Allyson Apostol	Outside Hitter			CSB

== Honors ==
=== Team ===
MPVA Season	Title	Ref.
2024	Champions	
2025	3rd place	

=== Individual ===
MPVA Season	Award	Name	Ref.
2024	Most Valuable Player	Rhea Mae Densing	
2024	Best Opposite Spiker	Rhea Mae Densing	
2024	1st Best Middle Blocker	Cristy Ondangan	
2024	Best Setter	Chenae Basarte	
2025	1st Best Middle Blocker	Zamantha Nolasco	

== Team captain ==
- (Philippines) Jessa Dorog (2024–present)

== Head coach ==
- (Philippines) Rogelio Getigan (2024–present)
