= Nasipit Lady Spikers =

Filipino women's volleyball team

- Founded: 2023
- Dissolved: 2023
- Owner: Roscoe Plaza
- League: Maharlika Pilipinas Volleyball Association
- 2023 MPVA season: 5th place

The Nasipit Lady Spikers, also known as Nasipit Lady Spikers – Agusan del Norte, is a Filipino women's developmental volleyball team based in Nasipit, Agusan del Norte. The team competes in the Maharlika Pilipinas Volleyball Association (MPVA) and began play during its inaugural season in 2023.

The team is owned by the municipal government of Nasipit and its mayor, Roscoe Plaza.

== History ==
The Nasipit Lady Spikers were first announced as one of the ten charter teams of the MPVA. For the inaugural 2023 season, the Nasipit Lady Spikers was captained by Maricar Nepomuceno-Baloaloa. Jayvee Sumagaysay, coming from the AMC Cotabato Spikers, took the role of team manager.

== 2023 roster ==
Nasipit Lady Spikers
Number	Player	Position	Height	Birth date	School
1	(Philippines) Princess Babiera	Middle Blocker			MU
2	(Philippines) Jewel Lai	Setter			CSB
3	(Philippines) Noheli Cerdeña	Middle Blocker			UPSHD
6	(Philippines) Chumcee Ann Caole	Setter	1.68 m (5 ft 6 in)		EC
7	(Philippines) Janel Delerio	Libero			UST
8	(Philippines) Maricar Nepomuceno-Baloaloa (C)	Outside Hitter	1.75 m (5 ft 9 in)	February 10, 1990 (age 36)	NU
9	(Philippines) Shereena Urmeneta	Opposite Hitter			CSJL
10	(Philippines) Ayena Gwen Espiritu	Setter	1.62 m (5 ft 4 in)		MU
11	(Philippines) Sheeka Gin Espinosa	Outside Hitter	1.68 m (5 ft 6 in)	August 26, 1996 (age 29)	TIP
12	(Philippines) Therese Manalo	Outside Hitter			MU
14	(Philippines) Jana Katrina Sta. Maria	Outside Hitter/ Opposite Hitter	1.72 m (5 ft 8 in)	August 12, 1996 (age 30)	UE
16	(Philippines) Zonxi Jane Dahab	Opposite Hitter/ Middle Blocker	1.70 m (5 ft 7 in)		LPU
18	(Philippines) Rica Jane Rivera	Libero	1.70 m (5 ft 7 in)	October 4, 1997 (age 28)	UST

Coaching staff'
Position	Name
Head Coach	(Philippines) Benjamin Mape
Team Manager	(Philippines) Jayvee Sumagaysay

== Honors ==
MPVA Season	Title	Source
2023	5th place	
