= Ynares Sports Arena =

Public indoor arena in Pasig, Philippines

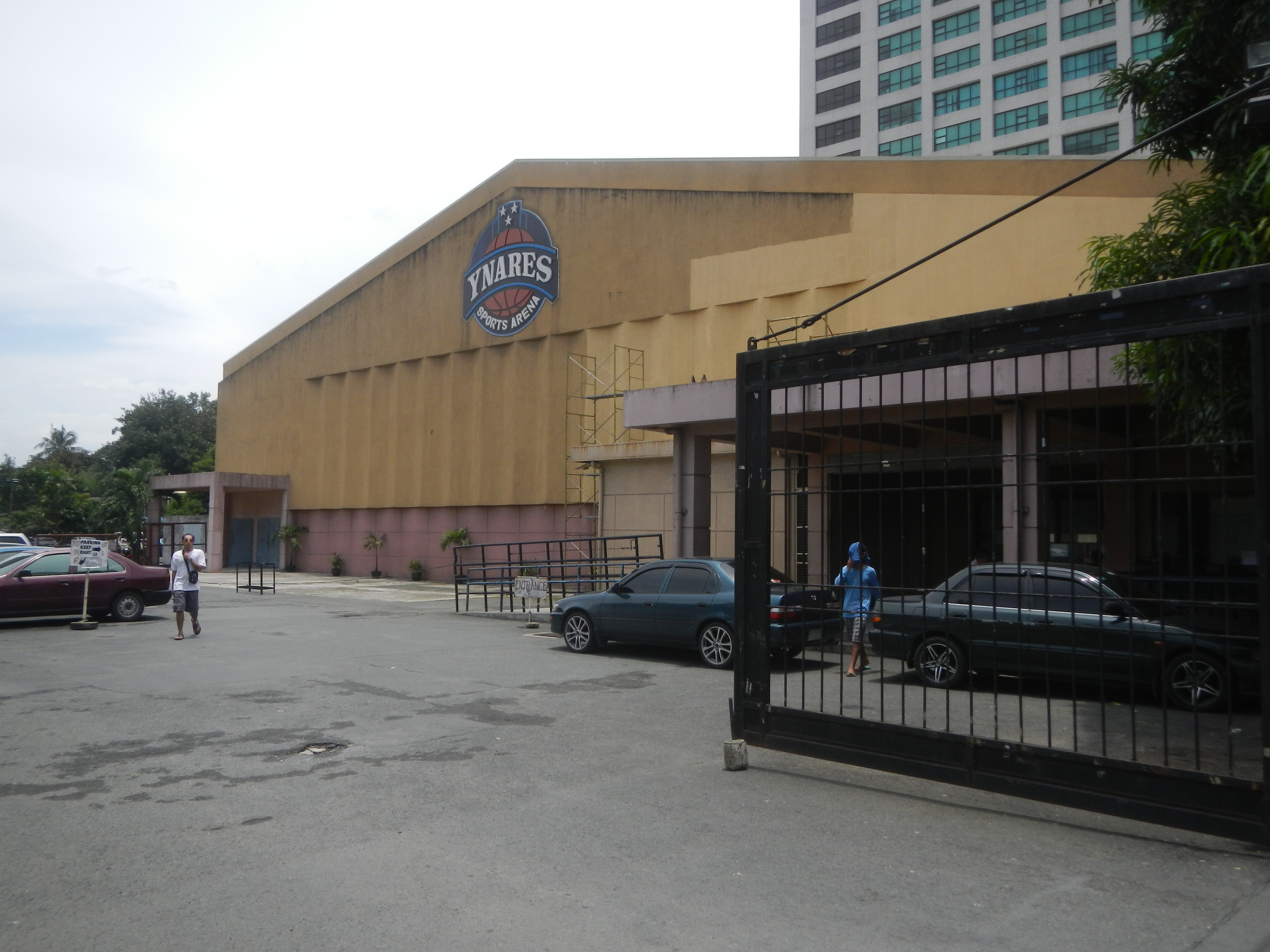
- Interactive map of Ynares Sports Arena
- Location: Shaw Boulevard, Pasig, Metro Manila, Philippines
- Coordinates: 14°34′25″N 121°03′47″E
- Owner: Rizal Provincial Government
- Operator: Rizal Provincial Government
- Capacity: 3,000

Construction
- Groundbreaking: 2006
- Opened: 2008

Tenants
- Philippine Basketball Association (2008–2010, 2021–present); PBA D-League (2011–present); Maharlika Pilipinas Basketball League (2022–present); Women's Maharlika Pilipinas Basketball League (2025–present); Philippine Patriots (2009–2012); San Miguel Beermen (2012–2014); UNTV Cup (2013–2016); Philippine Super Liga (2013–2019); Makati Super Crunch (2018–2019); Pasig City MPBL team (2022–2023, 2025–present)

The Ynares Sports Arena is an indoor arena located in Pasig, Metro Manila, Philippines. The stadium has hosted the basketball games of the Philippine Basketball Association, Philippine Basketball League, and Maharlika Pilipinas Basketball League, as well as college basketball tournaments. The arena was built in the former location of Rizal's provincial capitol (since redeveloped by Ortigas Land as Capitol Commons), just nearby the location of former Rizal Provincial Jail Facility.

== Events and tenants ==
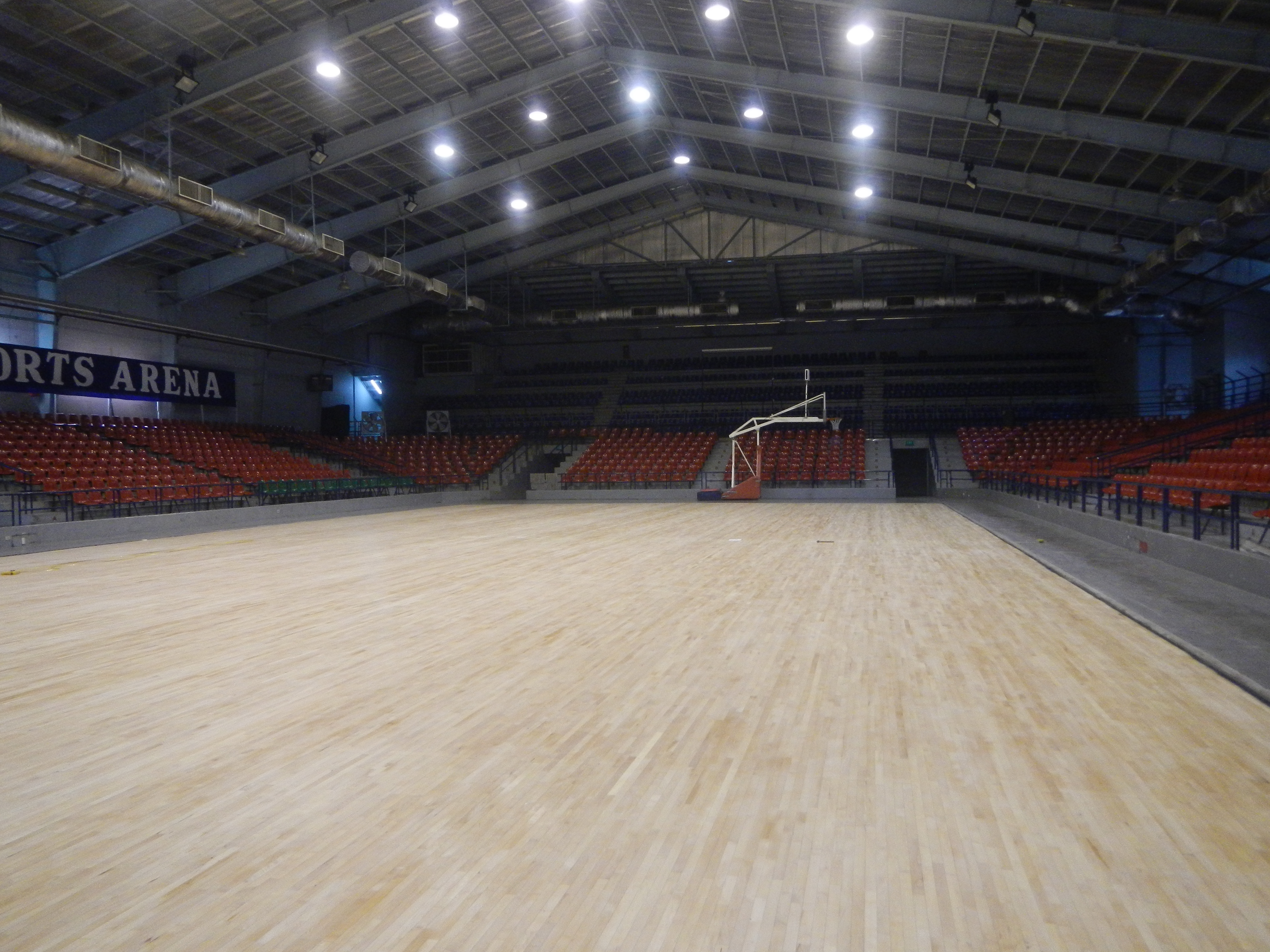
The interior of Ynares Sports Arena.

It is the primary home venue of the Maharlika Pilipinas Basketball League's Pasig City MCW Sports, playing in the arena since 2022. It was also the home of the Makati Super Crunch from 2018 until 2019. In 2023, it was the designated home arena of the Negros–ICC Blue Hawks of the Maharlika Pilipinas Volleyball Association.

ASEAN Basketball League (ABL) teams Philippine Patriots and the San Miguel Beermen also played home games in the arena. The Beermen notably lost the deciding game of the 2012 ABL finals to the Indonesia Warriors in the arena. It also has hosted games of the UNTV Cup.

The Philippine Basketball Association was meant to play exclusively in the arena during the 2021 PBA Philippine Cup due to COVID-19 restrictions. However, when Metro Manila, where Pasig is a part of, was put in a more restricted quarantine, games were transferred to a venue outside of Metro Manila.

== Notable events at Ynares Sports Arena ==
- Philippine Collegiate Champions League (2008, 2013, 2014, 2018, 2019)
- Star Factor finale (2010)
- ASEAN Basketball League (2009–10, 2011, 2012; home courts of the AirAsia Philippine Patriots and San Miguel Beermen)
- The Biggest Loser Pinoy Edition 1st season finale (2011)
- PBA Developmental League (2013 Foundation Cup, 2016 Foundation Cup, 2016 Aspirants' Cup, 2017 Asiprants' Cup, 2018 Foundation Cup, 2018 Aspirants' Cup, 2019 Aspirants', 2020 Aspirants')
- Philippine Super Liga (2013 Grand Prix, 2018 Grand Prix, 2018 Collegiate Grand Slam, 2018 Invitational, 2019 Grand Prix, 2019 Invitational)
- Icons of PInoy Rock concert (2015)
- UNTV Cup (Seasons 1, 2, 3, 4)
- Maharlika Pilipinas Basketball League (2018–19; home court of the Makati Super Crunch, 2022–2023, 2025–present; home court of the Pasig City MPBL team)
- Spikers' Turf (2nd Season 2nd Conference)
- Philippine Basketball Association (2021 Philippine Cup)
- Women's Maharlika Pilipinas Basketball League

=== Upcoming events ===
- Premier Volleyball League

Tenants
Preceded by first venue	Home of the Makati OKBet Kings; 2018–2019	Succeeded by Makati Coliseum
Preceded by Pasig Sports Center	Home of the Pasig City MPBL team 2022–2023, 2025–present	Succeeded by current
