= Marikina Sports Center =

Sports venue in Marikina, Philippines

- Marikina Sports Park; Marikina Sports Complex
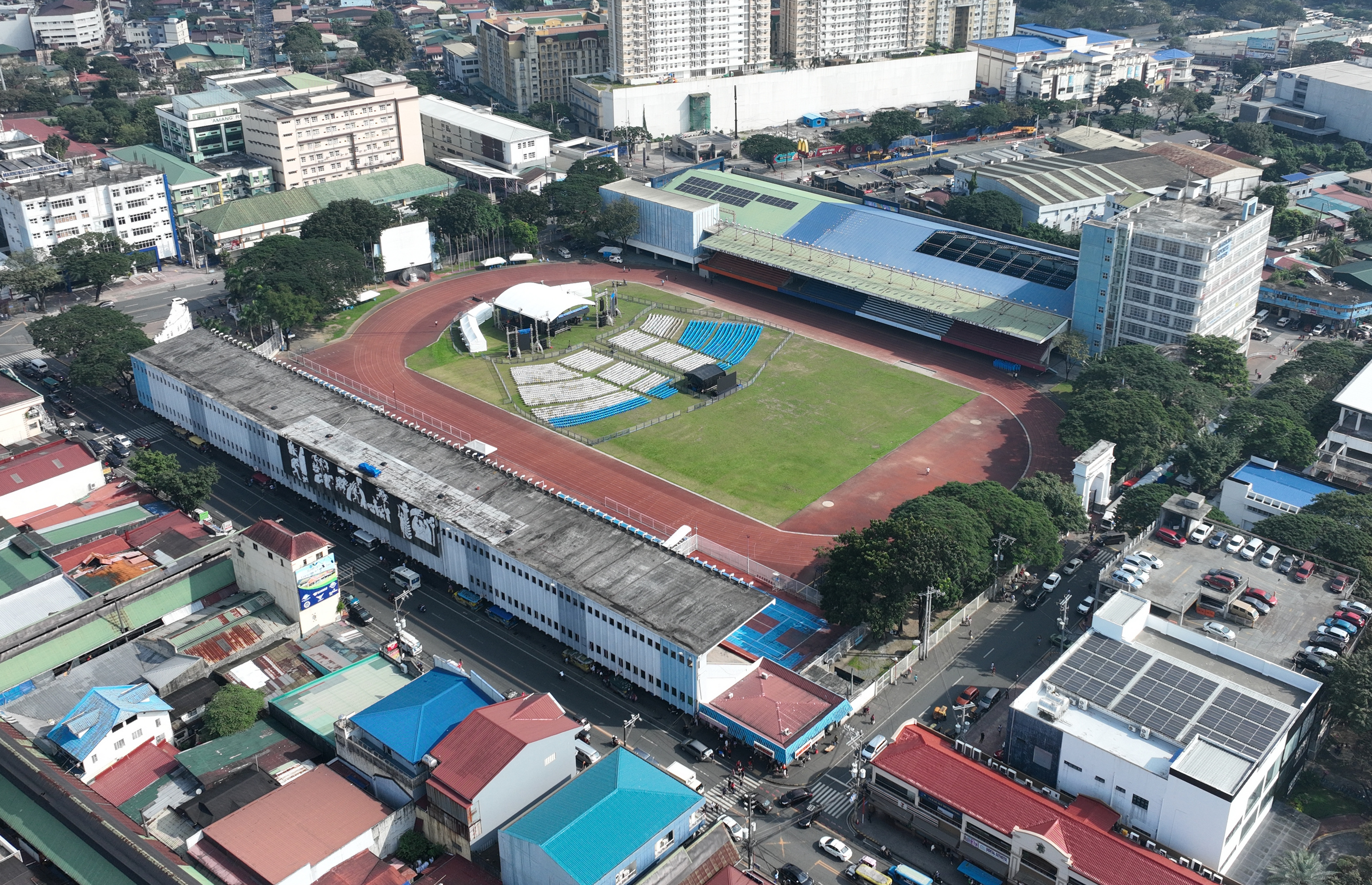
- Aerial view of the sports complex
- Interactive map of Marikina Sports Center
- Full name: Marikina Sports Center
- Former names: Rizal Provincial Sports Complex; Rodriguez Sports Center
- Location: Marikina, Metro Manila, Philippines
- Coordinates: 14°38′04.6″N 121°05′54.3″E
- Owner: Marikina City Government
- Main venue: Main Stadium; Capacity: 15,000
- Facilities: Aquatics Center, Indoor Gymnasium

Construction
- Opened: 1969
- Renovated: 2001, 2017, 2023

Tenants
- JPV Marikina F.C. (2017–2018); Marikina Shoemasters (2022–2023, 2025–present); Marikina Lady Shoemasters (2023–present)

The Marikina Sports Center, also known as Marikina Sports Park and formerly known as Rodriguez Sports Center, is a sports complex located in Marikina, at the corner of Shoe Avenue and Sumulong Highway in Metro Manila, Philippines.

It is the current home venue of the Marikina Verdiamonds Jewellers in the Maharlika Pilipinas Basketball League (MPBL) and the Pilipinas Super League, and its volleyball counterpart, the Marikina Lady Shoemasters of the Maharlika Pilipinas Volleyball Association (MPVA). It also served as the home venue of the JPV Marikina F.C. until 2018.

It also has hosted other sporting events, such as the Palarong Pambansa in 2023.

== History ==
Prior to its current sports facilities, the area is a site of PNR Mariquina Station back in the early 1900s. The Rodriguez Sports Center was built in 1969 under the Rizal Governor Isidro Rodriguez Sr. on a 3 hectares (7.4 acres) land owned by Marikina, then a municipality of Rizal. It is turned over to the Marikina municipal government under Mayor Bayani Fernando in 1995 and was renovated in 2001 under Mayor Maria Lourdes Carlos-Fernando. and was renamed the Marikina Sports Park.

Following the designation of the facility as the home ground of Philippines Football League sides, JPV Marikina F.C. in 2017, the facility's football pitch underwent renovations to meet league standards.

== Facilities ==
The Main Stadium, the football and athletics stadium of the Marikina Sports Center, consists of an athletics track, a 64 meters (210 ft) wide natural grass pitch, and two grandstands; the West and East Stands. The grandstands have a total seating capacity of 15,000 people. Between the West Stand and the athletics track are basketball and tennis courts. The West Stand is situated along Shoe Avenue. Prior to hosting its first Philippines Football League match, the football pitch hosted a bicycle track.

It also hosts an Olympic-size swimming pool inside an aquatics center which can accommodate 2,000 spectators, a sports building, and an indoor gymnasium with 7,000 seats.

The MSC hosts facilities for football, tennis, basketball, swimming, and martial arts. Its athletics tracks is open to the public in most nights for a small fee which is used for maintenance expenses of the sports center.

== Events ==
The area has been host to several sports competitions, including the 3rd ISF Men's World Championship 1972, the 1st Asian Athletics Championships 1973, and the 2014 ASEAN School Games which serves as the main venue. It also serves as the venue for women's football at the 2005 Southeast Asian Games and the venue of 2023 Palarong Pambansa, prior to that, it was supposed to be the main venue of 2020 Palarong Pambansa but canceled due to coronavirus pandemic. The venue also hosted religious events and several entertainment shows such as grand concerts, finals night and live television shows.

Aside from hosting events, Marikina Sports Center also hosts sports clinics for the residents of Marikina during the summer season yearly, dubbed the "Summer Sports Camp".

The main stadium of the facility has hosted Philippines Football League matches as the designated home venue of JPV Marikina F.C. since 2018. The facility has been named the home venue of the JPV Marikina since the inaugural 2017 PFL season though the club didn't play a single home game in the venue due to renovation works. The club started playing their home games at the venue on March 3, 2018, with a 2-1 win over Global Cebu.

== Gallery ==
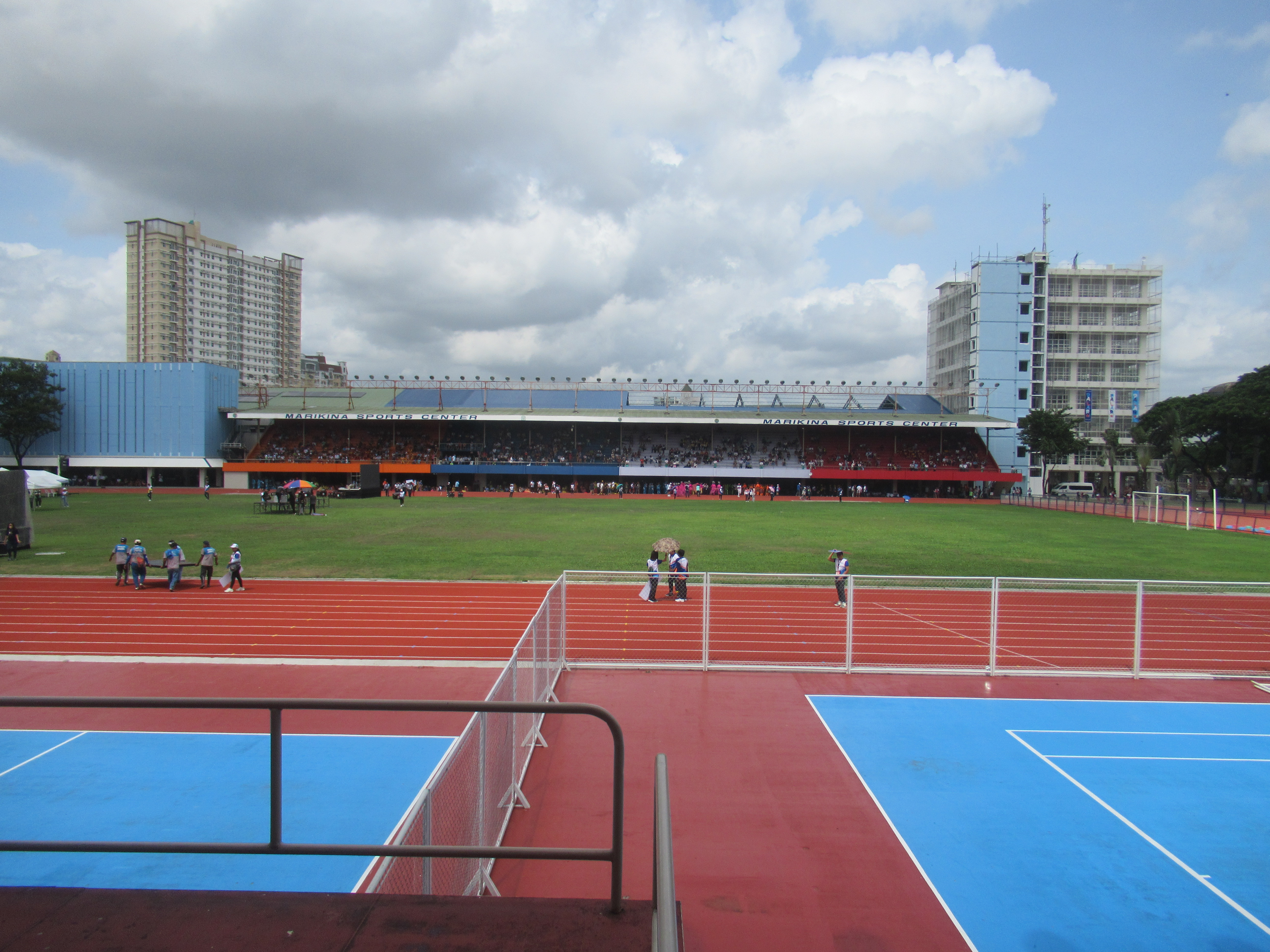
Grandstand, pitch, and open courts

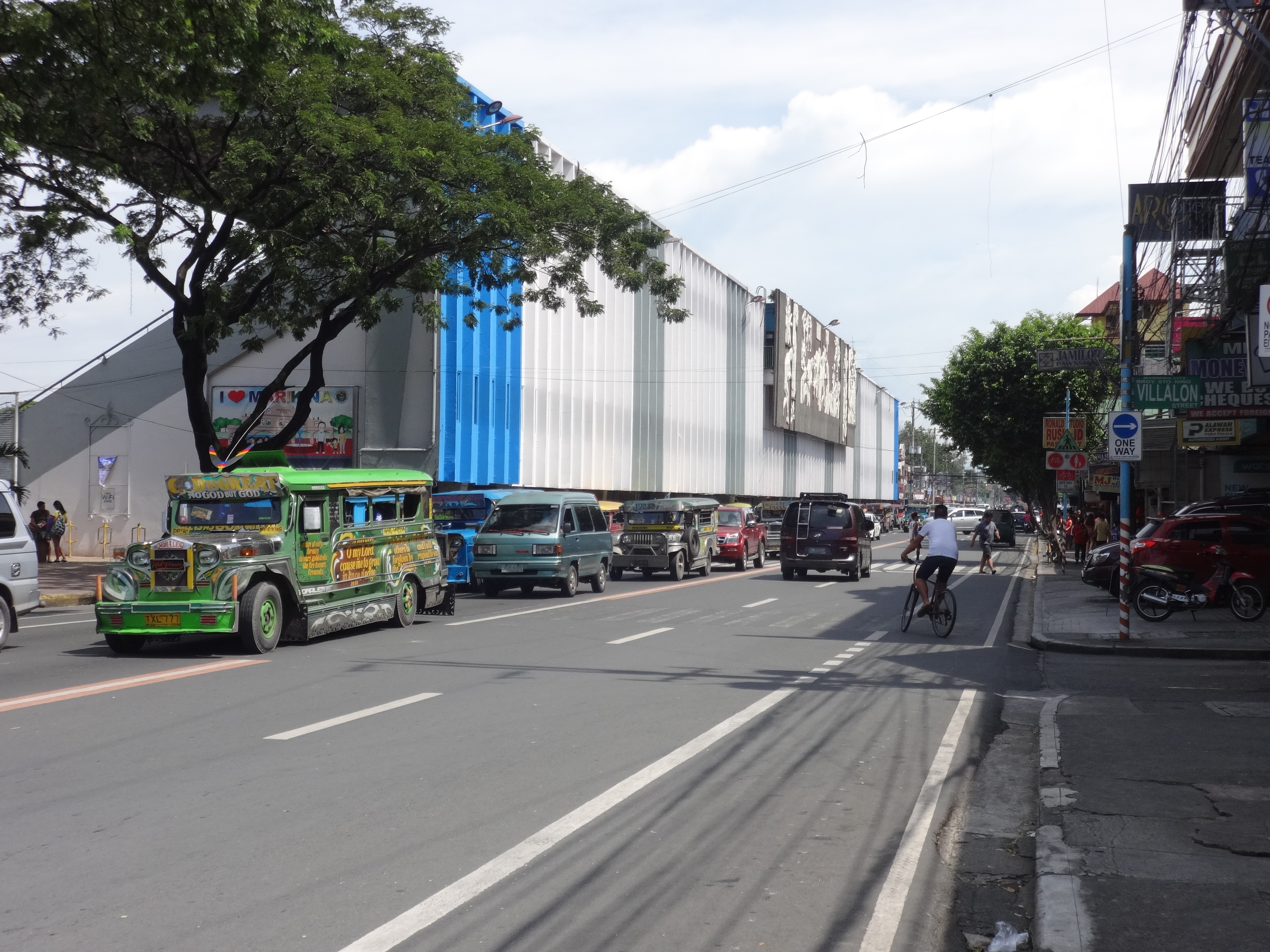
Grandstand

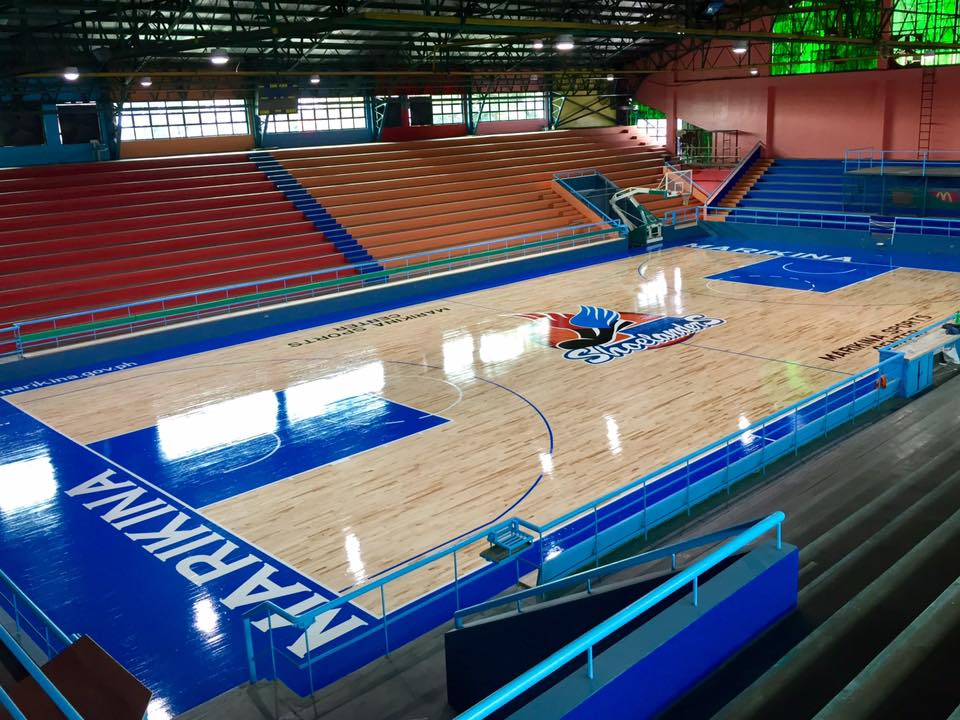
Indoor arena

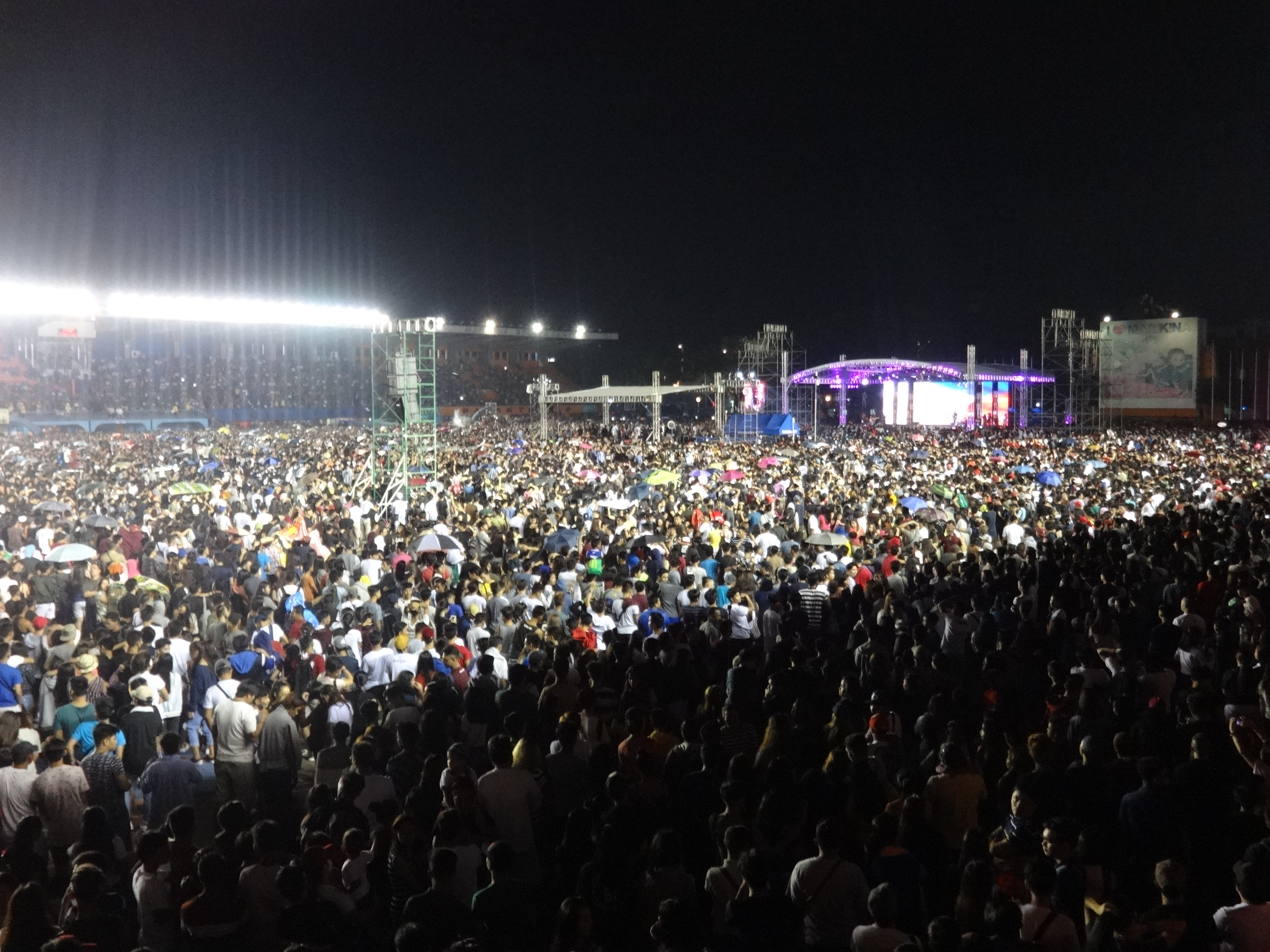
The venue during a year-end concert in 2017

Preceded by Marist School	Home of the Marikina Shoemasters; 2022–2023, 2025–present 2019–2020 (secondary)	Succeeded by current venue
