= Marikina Lady Shoemasters =

Filipino women's volleyball team

- Founded: 2023
- Owner: Elvis Tolentino
- Associate Coaches: Revie Ediliza Pioquinto; Andy Fiel
- Captain: Bien Elaine Juanillo
- League: Maharlika Pilipinas Volleyball Association
- 2025 MPVA season: 8th place

The Marikina Lady Shoemasters is a Filipino women's developmental volleyball team based in Marikina. The team plays in the Maharlika Pilipinas Volleyball Association (MPVA), since its inaugural season in 2023. The team plays their home matches at Marikina Sports Center.

The team is owned by city councilor Elvis Tolentino representing the City Government of Marikina.

== History ==
The Marikina Lady Shoemasters were first announced as one of the ten charter teams of the MPVA. For the inaugural 2023 season, the Lady Shoemasters will be captained by Shannen Palec.

== Team identity ==
Much like its older basketball counterpart, the name Shoemasters references Marikina's moniker as the "Shoe Capital of the Philippines".

== Current roster ==
Marikina Lady Shoemasters
Number	Player	Position	Height	Birth date	School
1	Asha Chastin Mangaring				WCC
2	Cassandra Nasol				WCC
3	Kyla Claire Dumaran				WCC
4	Juztine Jeica Olmedo	Middle Blocker			WCC
5	Jerlyn Mae Catalan	Outside Hitter			WCC
6	Sarah Princess Verutiao	Setter			AU
7	Bien Elaine Juanillo (C)	Opposite Hitter			LPU
8	Karla Concepcion	Libero			UP
9	Juliana Marie Abulon				WCC
10	Precious Lumiere Cruz	Opposite Hitter			WCC
11	Chritine Miralles	Middle Blocker			LPU
12	Iriis Oliveros	Outside Hitter			
13	Leila Pasco				
14	Bea Criselda Florentino	Opposite Hitter			WCC
15	Carla Donato	Middle Blocker			AU
16	Brigitte Martinez	Outside Hitter			WCC
17	Gabraelle Borja				WCC
18	Julia Balanquit				WCC
19	Pia Gabrielle Sarmiento	Libero			LPU
20	Graiza Asne	Libero			WCC
21	Mhikaela James Javier	Middle Blocker			WCC
22	Jazmyn Domingo	Libero			WCC
23	Khimberly Bandal				WCC
24	Thetys Taneo	Outside Hitter			UP

Coaching staff
Position	Name
Associate Coach	Andy Fiel
Associate Coach	Revie Ediliza Pioquinto
Physical Therapist	Justin Acob OurCare Physical Therapy
Trainer	Jandre Pete Lucero
Trainer	Jayvie Magana

== Previous roster ==
2024
Main article: 2024 MPVA season

Marikina Lady Shoemasters
Number	Player	Position	Height	Birth date	School
1	Asha Chastin Mangaring				WCC
2	Cassandra Nasol				WCC
3	Kyla Claire Dumaran				WCC
4	Juztine Jeica Olmedo	Middle Blocker			WCC
5	Jerlyn Mae Catalan	Outside Hitter			WCC
6	Sarah Princess Verutiao	Setter			AU
7	Bien Elaine Juanillo (C)	Opposite Hitter			LPU
8	Karla Concepcion	Libero			UP
9	Juliana Marie Abulon				WCC
10	Precious Lumiere Cruz	Opposite Hitter			WCC
11	Chritine Miralles	Middle Blocker			LPU
12	Iriis Oliveros	Outside Hitter			
13	Leila Pasco				
14	Bea Criselda Florentino	Opposite Hitter			WCC
15	Carla Donato	Middle Blocker			AU
16	Brigitte Martinez	Outside Hitter			WCC
17	Gabraelle Borja				WCC
18	Julia Balanquit				WCC
19	Pia Gabrielle Sarmiento	Libero			LPU
20	Graiza Asne	Libero			WCC
21	Mhikaela James Javier	Middle Blocker			WCC
22	Jazmyn Domingo	Libero			WCC
23	Khimberly Bandal				WCC
24	Thetys Taneo	Outside Hitter			UP

Coaching staff
Position	Name
Associate Coach	Andy Fiel
Associate Coach	Revie Ediliza Pioquinto
Physical Therapist	Justin Acob OurCare Physical Therapy
Trainer	Jandre Pete Lucero
Trainer	Jayvie Magana

2023
Main article: 2023 MPVA season

Marikina Lady Shoemasters
Number	Player	Position	Height	Birth date	School
1	Toni Rose Nitura	Middle Blocker			PSBA
2	Jeulyanna Ferrer	Outside Hitter			UP
3	Maria Victoria Pascual	Setter			WCC
4	Vira May Guillema	Setter	1.62 m (5 ft 4 in)	September 5, 1995 (age 30)	SSC–R
5	Angelica Dacaymat	Outside Hitter	1.67 m (5 ft 6 in)		UE
6	Melanie Romero	Outside Hitter			CSB
7	Sheena Mae Copitea	Middle Blocker			UP
8	Justine Rebleza	Outside Hitter			FEU
9	Ankhrisia Lero	Setter			UE
10	Alyza Desiderio	Opposite Hitter			WCC
11	Caryl Sandoval	Outside Hitter			UP
12	Sydney Niegos	Middle Blocker			JRU
13	Karla Concepcion	Libero			UP
15	Shannen Palec (C)	Opposite Hitter	1.75 m (5 ft 9 in)	September 28, 1996 (age 29)	UST
16	Alyssa Eroa	Libero	1.50 m (4 ft 11 in)	September 6, 1996 (age 29)	SSC–R
17	Mary Joy Onofre	Middle Blocker	1.80 m (5 ft 11 in)		LPU
18	Grenlen Malapit	Middle Blocker			LPU
19	Eloiza Balmedina	Middle Blocker			Sta. Elena HS, Marikina City

Coaching staff
Position	Name
Associate Coach	Andy Fiel
Associate Coach	Revie Ediliza Pioquinto
Strength and Conditioning Coach	Diane Ong
Trainer	Jandre Pete Lucero
Trainer	Jayvie Magana

== Honors ==
=== Team ===
MPVA Season	Title	Ref.
2023	3rd place	
2024	9th place	
2025	8th place	

=== Individual ===
MPVA Season	Award	Name	Ref.
2023	Best Libero	Alyssa Eroa	

== Team captains ==
- (Philippines) Shannen Palec (2023)
- (Philippines) Bien Elaine Juanillo (2024–present)

== Coaches ==
- (Philippines) Andy Fiel (2023–present)
- (Philippines) Revie Ediliza Pioquinto (2023–present)
