= San Juan Lady Knights =

The San Juan Lady Knights may refer to:

- San Juan Lady Knights (basketball)
- San Juan Lady Knights (volleyball)
