= Maharlika Pilipinas Volleyball Association =

Developmental volleyball league in the Philippines

Maharlika Pilipinas Volleyball Association (MPVA)
- Upcoming season or competition: 2026 MPVA season
- Sport: Volleyball
- Founded: September 15, 2023; 3 years ago
- Founder: Manny Pacquiao
- First season: 2023
- Commissioner: Michael Tavera
- Motto: Ang Liga Para Sa Lahat (The League for All)
- No. of teams: 8 (Women's Division); 7 (Men's Division)
- Country: Philippines
- Most recent champions: Women's: Dasmariñas City Monarchs (2025)
- Most titles: Women’s: Bacoor City Strikers; Quezon Tangerines; Dasmariñas City Monarchs (1 title each); Men's: TBD
- Broadcaster: Solar Sports

The Maharlika Pilipinas Volleyball Association (MPVA) is a semi-professional regional volleyball league in the Philippines consisting of seven teams.

The MPVA was founded in 2023 by eight-division boxing world champion Manny Pacquiao, who also founded the similarly-named Maharlika Pilipinas Basketball League (MPBL) in 2017. Similar to its basketball counterpart, it is meant to be a grassroots league with a focus on showcasing local, homegrown talents. It is the third league under the Maharlika Pilipinas name, following the MPBL and the Junior MPBL.

In 2026, it was announced that the league is set to hold its first-ever men's tournament, thru the help of Strong Group Athletics of Frank Lao, and the organizing Volleyball Masters of the Philippines (VMP) led by Dr. Ian Laurel.

The Dasmariñas City Monarchs are the current defending champions, after defeating the Biñan Tatak Gel Arellano Lady Chiefs in the finals of the 2025 MPVA season.

== History ==
=== Background ===
On August 29, 2017, Manny Pacquiao founded the Maharlika Pilipinas Basketball League, a semi-professional basketball league that uses a home-and-away system with a focus on showcasing local talents. By 2023, the league was promoted to a professional league and has run for five seasons. On June 15, 2023, Pacquiao shared his intent to create a home-and-away volleyball league similar to the MPBL that will cater to women athletes.

=== Launch ===
On September 15, 2023, Pacquiao formally launched the MPVA in a press conference with commissioner Michael Tavera. Announced in the press conference was a list of ten teams that were set to compete in the inaugural season, with all but one of them having a set locality. The league's future plans include a men's division in 2024 as well as its own junior's division. One month later, in another press conference, the lineup was decreased to eight teams, with three teams deferring and one team joining.

The MPVA's inaugural season began on October 22, 2023 at the Ynares Center in Antipolo, Rizal with the opening ceremonies followed by a doubleheader of matches. The inaugural season was won by the Bacoor City Strikers.

The league's 2024 season is set to begin on August 11, 2024, which is referred to by the league as its first season of full length. It featured nine teams, one more than last season.

== Teams ==
In its first season, the MPVA consisted of eight teams. For its second season in 2024, the league expanded to nine teams.

Metro Manila and Calabarzon both have the most teams out of any region with four each. The Negros Blue Hawks are the only outlier, being the only team based in the Negros Island Region. In terms of island groups, Luzon has eight while Visayas has one.

| Locations of teams based in Metro Manila | Locations of teams based in Calabarzon | Locations of teams based in Visayas |

Overview of MPVA teams
| Team | Location | Home venue(s) | Capacity | First season | Head coach | Team captain |
|---|---|---|---|---|---|---|
| Biñan Tatak Gel Arellano Lady Chiefs | Biñan, Laguna | Alonte Sports Arena | 6,500 | 2023 | Roberto Javier | Alona Nicole Caguicla |
| Caloocan AM Spikers | Caloocan | Caloocan Sports Complex | 2,500 | 2023 | Michael Paleramo | Sheeka Gin Espinosa |
| Dasmariñas City Monarchs | Dasmariñas, Cavite | City of Dasmariñas Arena | 5,000 | 2025 | Regine Diego | Evangeline Alinsug |
| Marikina Lady Shoemasters | Marikina | Marikina Sports Center | 7,000 | 2023 | Andy Fiel | Bien Elaine Juanillo |
| Negros Blue Hawks | Negros Island | Ynares Sports Arena (Note: Used as a designated home arena; not located within the team's home locality.) | 3,000 | 2023 | Jessie Barroga | Charlotte Tutanes |
| Pasay Lady Voyagers | Pasay | Cuneta Astrodome | 5,000 | 2025 | Anna Cammile Abanto | Jozza Mae Cabalsa |
| Quezon Tangerines | Lucena | Quezon Convention Center | 7,000 | 2024 | Rogelio Getigan | Jessa Dorog |
| San Juan Lady Knights | San Juan | Playtime Filoil Centre | 6,000 | 2023 | Bernie Crisologo | Therese Angeli Manalo |

=== Former teams ===
| Team | Locality | First season | Last season |
|---|---|---|---|
| Bacoor City Strikers | Bacoor, Cavite | 2023 | 2024 |
| Nasipit Lady Spikers | Nasipit, Agusan del Norte | 2023 | |
| Rizal St. Gerrard Charity Foundation | Antipolo, Rizal | 2023 | 2024 |
| Valenzuela Classy | Valenzuela | 2024 | |

== Roster regulations ==
The league has a set of roster regulations, putting restrictions on which and how many players each team can place onto its roster. As of 2023, the roster regulations are as follows:

- All players must be at least eighteen (18) years old to be able to join a team.
- Each team must have at least three homegrown players – players who are native to the team's home locality.
- Each team is limited to three players with prior participation in professional leagues such as the Premier Volleyball League.

== Format ==
=== Current ===
The current season format involves all participating teams competing in a double round-robin tournament during the preliminary round, meaning each team plays two matches against all other teams. The league's pool standing procedure prioritizes match points over wins. The top four teams of the prelims advance to a two-round playoff tournament where the top two get twice-to-beat advantage in the semifinals. Meanwhile, the finals is a best-of-three series.

=== Previous ===
During the 2023 season, the preliminary round was divided into two stages. After the traditional single round-robin, the teams were reorganized into two groups where they would play one match against other teams within the same group. All eight teams then took part in a three-round playoff tournament with the top four getting twice-to-beat advantage during the quarterfinals. The all other rounds were best-of-three.

== Result summary ==
| Season | Champions | Runner-up | 3rd place |
|---|---|---|---|
| 2023 | Bacoor City Strikers | Negros–ICC Blue Hawks | Marikina Lady Shoemasters |
| 2024 | Quezon Tangerines | Biñan Tatak Gel Volley Angels | Rizal St. Gerrard Charity Foundation |
| 2025 | Dasmariñas City Monarchs | Biñan Tatak Gel Arellano Lady Chiefs | Quezon Tangerines |

== Medal summary ==
| Rank | Team | Gold | Silver | Bronze | Total |
|---|---|---|---|---|---|
| 1 | Bacoor City | 1 | 0 | 0 | 1 |
| 1 | Dasmariñas | 1 | 0 | 0 | 1 |
| 2 | Quezon | 1 | 0 | 1 | 2 |
| 2 | Biñan | 0 | 2 | 0 | 2 |
| 3 | Negros | 0 | 1 | 0 | 1 |
| 3 | Marikina | 0 | 0 | 1 | 1 |
| 3 | Rizal | 0 | 0 | 1 | 1 |

== Media coverage ==
For the first two seasons, the league's broadcast rights was aired every game via Cignal TV on television through Media Pilipinas TV (MPTV), with One PH served as an additional TV broadcaster and Pilipinas Live for streaming. In April 2025, Media Pilipinas TV (MPTV) ceased its broadcast following the contract's expiration of its sister sports league and transferred to Solar Sports, leaving MPVA's broadcasting rights uncertain.

During the inaugural season, the Plus Network also streamed the games on its social channels.

The league also streams the games on its social media channels. Similar to the MPBL, the MPVA has its own broadcast feed that is used across all platforms.

== See also ==
- Volleyball in the Philippines
