= List of all-time MPBL win–loss records =

The Maharlika Pilipinas Basketball League (MPBL) is a men's professional basketball league in the Philippines. Since its first season in 2018, it saw a total of 37 teams (27 active and 10 former) compete across six seasons. This list shows the overall win–loss records of each MPBL team that competed (excluding play-in tournament introduced in 2025 season).

In the regular season, every team plays every other team once, regardless of division alignment. The top eight teams in each division advance to a four-round playoff bracket to determine the MPBL champion for the season.

== Team records ==
Records as of the 2025 MPBL season:

=== All-Time Regular season ===
Key
⁂	Best win–loss record in division

italic indicates former team

Rank	Team	GP	Won	Lost	PCT	First season	Last season	Seasons	Division
1	San Juan Knights	161	121	30	.814	2018–19		6	North ⁂
2	Abra Weavers	57	46	11	.807	2024		2	North
3	Nueva Ecija Rice Vanguards	136	105	31	.772	2019–20	2025	5	North
4	Quezon Huskers	85	65	20	.765	2023		3	South
5	Pampanga Giant Lanterns	161	119	42	.739	2018–19	2025	6	North
6	Batangas City Tanduay Rum Masters	170	121	49	.711	2018		7	South ⁂
7	Bacoor City Strikers	104	69	35	.663	2018–19	2023	4	South
8	Davao Occidental Tigers	112	73	49	.652	2018–19	2025	3	South
9	Zamboanga Master Sardines	161	105	56	.652	2018–19		5	South
10	GenSan Warriors	161	103	58	.640	2018–19		6	South
11	Makati Skyscrapers	104	66	38	.635	2018–19	2023	4	North
12	Pasay Voyagers	149	81	59	.579	2018–19		5	North
13	Pangasinan Heatwaves	57	32	25	.561	2024	2025	2	North
14	Caloocan Batang Kankaloo	170	94	76	.553	2018		7	North
15	Bataan Risers	170	93	77	.547	2018		7	North
16	Basilan Steel	84	45	39	.536	2018–19		3	South
17	Ilagan Isabela Cowboys	29	15	14	.517	2025		1	North
18	Pasig City	133	67	66	.504	2018–19		5	North
19	Manila Batang Quiapo	160	79	81	.494	2018–19		6	North
20	Iloilo United Royals	86	41	45	.477	2019–20		3	South
21	Cebu Greats	84	37	47	.440	2018-19		3	South
22	Rizal Golden Coolers	160	69	91	.431	2018–19		6	North
23	Biñan Tatak Gel	160	66	94	.413	2018–19		6	South
24	Muntinlupa Cagers/Meycauayan Marilao Gems	170	67	103	.394	2018		7	South
25	Negros Hacienderos	56	22	34	.393	2023		2	South
26	Navotas Clutch	63	24	39	.381	2018	2019–20	3	North
27	Quezon City Black Bulls	170	61	109	.359	2018		7	North
28	Valenzuela City Darkhorse	170	61	109	.359	2018		7	North
29	Bulacan Kuyas	152	51	101	.336	2018		6	North
30	Parañaque Patriots	149	49	100	.329	2018		6	South
31	Mandaluyong El Tigre	25	8	17	.321	2018–19	2018–19	1	North
32	Marikina Shoemasters	161	51	110	.317	2018–19		6	North
33	Sarangani Marlins	107	33	74	.308	2019–20		4	South
34	Bacolod Masskara	136	41	95	.301	2019–20		5	South
35	Mindoro Tamaraws	136	41	95	.301	2019–20		5	South
36	Imus Agimat	170	50	120	.294	2018		7	South
37	Bicol Volcanoes	86	20	66	.233	2019–20	2024	3	South

=== Playoffs ===
Records as of the 2025 MPBL finals:

Key
⁂	Best win–loss record in division
★	Current defending champions
	Qualified for most recent playoffs

Rank	Team	App.	GP	Won	Lost	PCT	Last appearance	Titles	Division
1	Abra Weavers	2	12	10	2	.833	2025 ★	1	North ⁂
2	Pampanga Giant Lanterns	5	29	22	7	.739	2025	2	North
3	Nueva Ecija Rice Vanguards	3	19	13	6	.684	2025	1	North
4	San Juan Knights	6	47	32	15	.681	2025	1	North
5	Davao Occidental Tigers	3	26	17	9	.654	2024	1	South ⁂
6	Batangas City Tanduay Rum Masters	7	49	30	19	.612	2025	1	South
7	Quezon Huskers	3	25	14	11	.560	2025	0	South
8	Basilan Steel	2	11	6	5	.545	2025	0	
9	Bacoor City Strikers	22	22	12	19	.545	2023	0	
10	Biñan Tatak Gel	2	3	7	6	.538	2025	0	South
11	Manila Batang Quiapo	3	15	8	7	.533	2024	0	North
12	Bacolod Masskara	1	6	3	3	.500	2022	0	South
13	Zamboanga Sikat	5	34	16	18	.471	2025	0	South
14	Parañaque Patriots	2	11	5	6	.455	2024	0	South
15	Pangasinan Heatwaves	1	9	4	5	.444	2025	0	North
16	Makati Skyscrapers	3	12	5	7	.417	2023	0	North
17	Caloocan Batang Kankaloo	4	15	6	9	.400	2025	0	North
18	Muntinlupa Cagers/Meycauayan Marilao Gems	4	17	7	10	.370	2023	0	South
19	South Cotabato Warriors	6	24	9	15	.375	2025	0	South
20	Bataan Risers	4	12	4	8	.333	2022	0	North
21	Quezon City Toda Aksyon	3	9	3	6	.333	2022	0	North
22	Bicol Volcanoes	1	3	1	2	.333	2020–21	0	South
23	Pasig City	3	9	3	6	.333	2023	0	North
24	Valenzuela City Darkhorse	2	7	2	5	.286	2022	0	North
25	Rizal Golden Coolers	3	8	2	6	.250	2025	0	North
26	Iloilo United Royals	2	5	1	4	.200	2023	0	South
27	Imus Agimat	2	5	1	4	.200	2023	0	South
28	Bulacan Kuyas	3	7	1	6	.143	2020–21	0	North
29	Sarangani Marlins	1	2	0	2	.000	2022	0	South
30	Cebu Greats	1	2	0	2	.000	2019	0	South
31	Negros Hacienderos	1	2	0	2	.000	2024	0	South
32	Mindoro Tamaraws	1	2	0	2	.000	2025	0	South
33	Ilagan Isabela Cowboys	1	2	0	2	.000	2025	0	North
34	Marikina Shoemasters	2	4	0	4	.000	2023	0	North
35	Navotas Clutch	2	4	0	4	.000	2019	0	North
36	Pasay Voyagers	4	8	0	8	.000	2025	0	North

- As of 2025, the Mandaluyong El Tigre are the only former team that did not qualify for any playoff series.

== MPBL Finals ==
Rank	Team	GP	Won	Lost	PCT	Last Appearance	Titles	Division
1	Pampanga Giant Lanterns	6	6	0	1.000	2024	2	North
2	Abra Weavers	3	3	0	1.000	2025	1	North
3	Batangas City Tanduay Rum Masters	4	3	1	.750	2018	1	South
4	Nueva Ecija Rice Vanguards	4	3	1	.750	2022	1	North
5	Davao Occidental Tigers	9	5	4	.556	2021	1	South
6	San Juan Knights	9	4	5	.444	2021	1	North
7	Muntinlupa Cagers/Meycauayan Marilao Gems	4	1	3	.250	2018	0	North
8	Zamboanga Sikat	4	1	3	.250	2022	0	South
9	Bacoor City Strikers	3	0	3	.000	2023	0	South
10	Quezon Huskers	6	0	6	.000	2025	0	South

== See also ==
- List of MPBL seasons
- List of MPBL records
