= 2026 MPBL Preseason Invitational =

Preseason tournament for the Maharlika Pilipinas Basketball League's 2026 season

Tournament details
- Country: Philippines
- Venue: Various
- Dates: February 7 – March 21, 2026
- Teams: 18

Final positions
- Champions: Abra Solid North Weavers
- Runners-up: Quezon Huskers

Tournament statistics
- Matches played: 77

The 2026 MPBL Preseason Invitational was the preseason tournament for the Maharlika Pilipinas Basketball League's 2026 season and the fourth edition of the MPBL Preseason Invitational. The tournament started on February 7, 2026, and ended on March 21.

This is the first preseason tournament since 2021 that the tournament will be held outside General Santos City. The last two editions were held at the Lagao Gymnasium, and this will be the first time in the pocket tournament that the league will be using multiple venues.

The 2026 edition will return to a bigger-scale tournament similar to the 2021 Invitational, with 18 teams set to compete in this tournament, including 17 member teams and a selection team from the Junior MPBL D-League.

The Abra Solid North Weavers were the tournament champions after defeating the Quezon Huskers with a score of 67–47 in the final tournament.

== Teams ==
A total of eighteen teams competed in the tournament, the second-most behind the 2021 edition's 22 teams. These include seventeen MPBL teams, as well as the Junior MPBL D-League Team, the league's second-ever guest team after Gensan Bulalakaw. Making their first Invitational appearances are the Abra Solid North Weavers, Quezon Huskers, Pasay Voyagers, and the Ilagan Isabela Cowboys. With the exit of the Valenzuela franchise in the preseason tournament, the GenSan Warriors remain the only team to never miss a preseason appearance.

List of 2026 MPBL Preseason Invitational teams
Team	Invitational statistics			2025 season statistics	
Team	Apps.	Last	Best result	Record	Playoff result
Abra Solid North Weavers	1	—N/a		28–1 (.966)	Champion
Bacolod Masskara	2	2021	Group stage	4–25 (.138)	–
Bataan Risers	2	2024	Group stage	13–16 (.448)	Clinched play-in; did not make playoffs
Batangas City Tanduay Rum Masters	3	2024	Third Place	20–9 (.690)	Division semifinals
Biñan Tatak Gel	2	2024	Group Stage	17–12 (.586)	Division finals
Caloocan Batang Kankaloo	2	2021	Group stage	21–8 (.724)	Division semifinals
Ilagan Isabela Cowboys	1	—N/a		15–14 (.517)	Division quarterfinals
GenSan Warriors	4	2024	Runner-up	18–11 (.621)	Division semifinals
Junior MPBL D-League Team (guest team)	1	—N/a			
Marikina Shoemasters	2	2021	Group Stage	4–25 (.138)	–
Mindoro Tamaraws	2	2021	Quarterfinals	15–14 (.517)	Division quarterfinals
Muntinlupa Cagers	2	2021	Group Stage	10–19 (.345)	–
Pasay Voyagers	1	—N/a		21–8 (.724)	Division quarterfinals
Quezon Huskers	1	—N/a		25–4 (.862)	National finals
Quezon City Black Bulls	2	2024	Fourth Place	7–22 (.241)	–
San Juan Knights	2	2021	Quarterfinals	26–3 (.897)	Division semifinals
Sarangani 10Act	3	2023	Fourth Place	11–18 (.379)	–
Zamboanga Sikat	2	2023	Runner-up	17–12 (.586)	Division quarterfinals

== Format ==
The tournament will be divided into two stages: the group stage and the playoffs. The eighteen participating teams were divided into two groups of nine. Both groups play in a single round-robin format, wherein each team plays one game against all other teams within the same group. The top three teams in each group advance to a six-team, three-round, single-elimination playoff consisting of all knockout games.

For the first time in the Preseason Invitational, the Battle for Third will not be held.

Teams that will advance to the preseason finals will have their tournament fee waived for the 2026 MPBL season. Those who will advance to the playoffs will receive a 50 percent discount.

== Venues ==
Group Stage	Group Stage and Semifinals	Group Stage		
Bataan Risers	Biñan Tatak Gel	Caloocan Batang Kankaloo	Marikina Shoemasters	Pasay Voyagers
Orion Sports Complex; Orion, Bataan	Alonte Sports Arena; Biñan, Laguna	Caloocan Sports Complex; Caloocan	Marikina Sports Center; Marikina	Cuneta Astrodome; Pasay
Capacity: 2,000	Capacity: 6,500	Capacity: 3,000	Capacity: 7,000	Capacity: 12,000

Knockout Round
San Juan Knights
Playtime Filoil Centre
San Juan
Capacity: 6,000
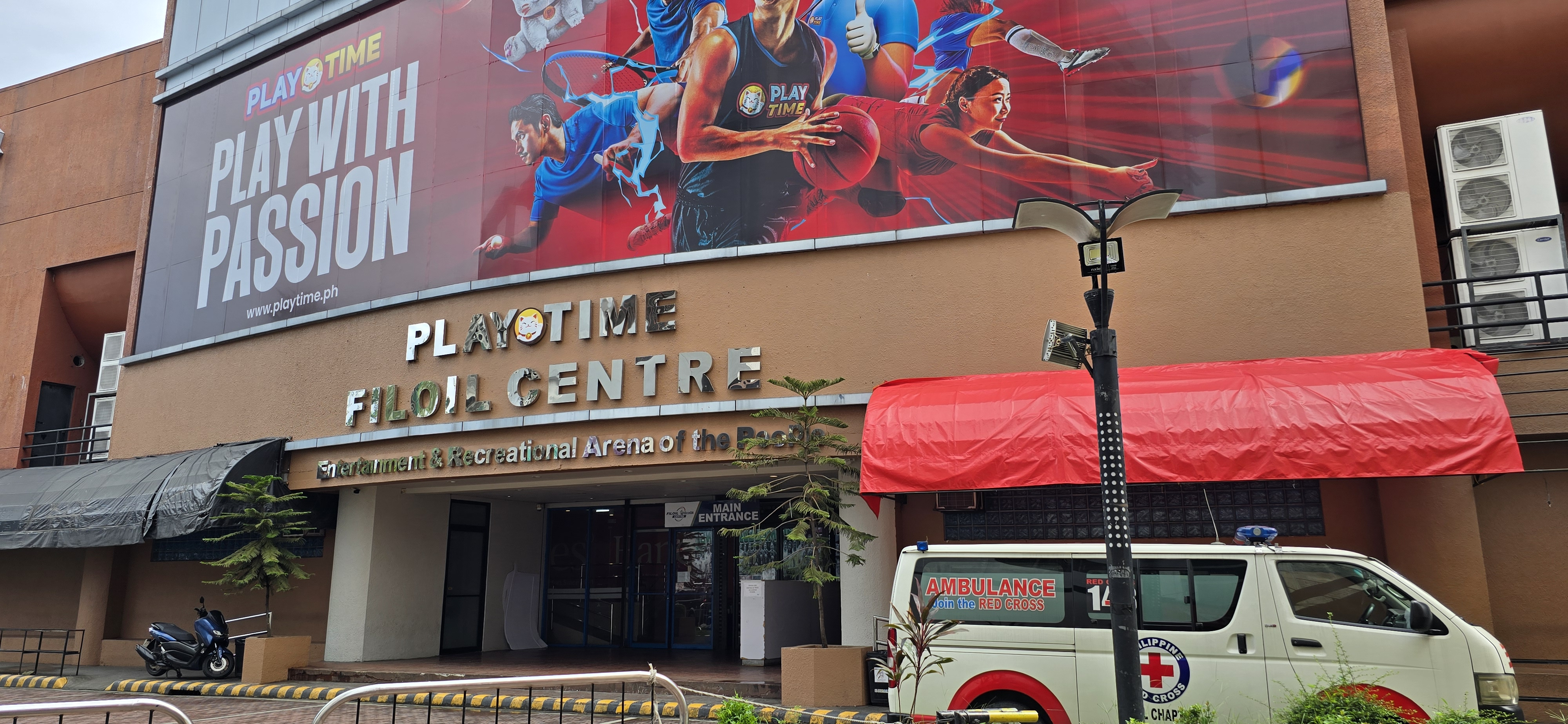

Finals	Group Stage	
Neutral
Bren Z. Guiao Convention Center; San Fernando, Pampanga	One Arena; Cainta, Rizal	Paco Arena; Manila
Capacity: 3,000	Capacity: 3,000	Capacity: 1,000

== Group stage ==
=== Group A ===
Pos	Team	Pld	W	L	GB	Qualification
1	Abra Solid North Weavers	8	8	0	—	Semifinals
2	Batangas City Tanduay Rum Masters	8	6	2	2	Knockout Round
3	Mindoro Tamaraws	8	5 (Note: Mindoro (1.050) wins tiebreaker over Gensan (0.993) and Biñan (0.967) based on head-to-head point quotient.)	3	3	Knockout Round
4	GenSan Warriors	8	5	3	3	
5	Biñan Tatak Gel	8	5	3	3	
6	Quezon City Black Bulls	8	4	4	4	
7	Bataan Risers	8	2	6	6	
8	Bacolod Masskara	8	1	7	7	
9	Sarangani 10Act	8	0	8	8	

Rules for classification: 1) Wins; 2a) If two teams are tied, head-to-head match-up; 2b) If three or more teams are tied, head-to-head point quotient; 3) overall point quotient; 4) coin toss.

==== Results table ====
Team	Game							
Team	1	2	3	4	5	6	7	8
Abra (ABR)	SAR; 102–88	BAN; 81–69	BCD; 93–69	QC; 88–73	MDR; 111–98	BIÑ ^{(A)} 73–70*	BTG; 77–69	GSW; 81–67
Bacolod (BCD)	ABR; 69–93	BTG; 49–106	QC; 66–77	SAR; 82–74	GSW; 74–112	MDR; 70–90	BIÑ; 74–128	BAN; 82–129
Bataan (BAN)	BTG; 60–77	ABR; 69–81	MDR; 78–86	GSW; 79–94	SAR ^{(H)} 95–80	QC; 79–80	BIÑ ^{(A)} 68–75	BCD; 129–82
Batangas City (BTG)	BAN; 77–60	MDR; 88–58	GSW; 100–80	BCD; 106–49	SAR; 106–78	QC; 69–70	BIÑ ^{(A)} 74–58	ABR; 69–77
Biñan (BIÑ)	MDR; 65–79	GSW; 83–74	SAR; 101–78	QC ^{(H)} 74–65	ABR ^{(H)} 70–73*	BTG ^{(H)} 58–74	BAN ^{(H)} 75–68	BCD; 128–74
General Santos (GSW)	BIÑ; 74–83	BTG; 80–100	BAN; 94–79	MDR; 74–67	BCD; 112–74	SAR; 113–81	QC; 70–66	ABR; 67–81
Mindoro (MDR)	BIÑ; 79–65	BTG; 58–88	BAN; 86–78	ABR; 98–111	GSW; 67–74	SAR; 112–92	QC; 69–67	BCD; 90–70
Quezon City (QC)	SAR; 78–74	ABR; 73–88	BIÑ ^{(A)} 65–74	BCD; 77–66	BTG; 70–69	BAN; 80–79	MDR; 67–69	GSW; 66–70
Sarangani (SAR)	ABR; 88–102	QC; 74–78	BIÑ; 78–101	BTG; 78–106	BAN ^{(A)} 80–95	BCD; 74–82	MDR; 92–112	GSW; 81–113

Legend: Blue = win; Red = loss; Matches with lighter background shading were decided after overtime. (*) Number of asterisks denotes number of overtime periods

Notes

- Games that are played home or away are indicated by the superscript after the opposing team's abbreviation (H for home and A for away). Games with no superscript are neutral-site.

=== Group B ===
Pos	Team	Pld	W	L	GB	Qualification
1	Quezon Huskers	8	7 (Note: Quezon wins tiebreaker over San Juan based on head-to-head matchup.)	1	—	Semifinals
2	San Juan Knights	8	7	1	—	Knockout Round
3	Caloocan Batang Kankaloo	8	6	2	1	Knockout Round
4	Muntinlupa Cagers	8	4 (Note: Muntinlupa (1.052) wins tiebreaker over Pasay (1.000) and Zamboanga (0.954) based on head-to-head point quotient.)	4	3	
5	Pasay Voyagers	8	4	4	3	
6	Zamboanga Sikat	8	4	4	3	
7	Ilagan Isabela Cowboys	8	3	5	4	
8	Marikina Shoemasters	8	1	7	6	
9	Junior MPBL D-League Team	8	0	8	7	

Rules for classification: 1) Wins; 2a) If two teams are tied, head-to-head match-up; 2b) If three or more teams are tied, head-to-head point quotient; 3) overall point quotient; 4) coin toss.

==== Results table ====
Team	Game							
Team	1	2	3	4	5	6	7	8
Caloocan (CAL)	MUN ^{(H)} 74–66	SJK; 59–65	PSY ^{(A)} 71–63	MAR ^{(A)} 100–89	ILA; 85–65	QZN; 74–60	ZAM ^{(H)} 76–81	DLG ^{(H)} 80–63
D-League (DLG)	QZN; 80–116	MUN; 67–94	ILA; 72–90	SJK; 59–122	PSY; 60–79	MAR; 79–84	CAL ^{(A)} 63–80	ZAM; 75–104
Ilagan Isabela (ILA)	PSY; 69–76	SJK; 82–85	MAR ^{(A)} 99–95*	DLG; 90–72	QZN; 64–85	CAL; 65–85	ZAM; 78–63	MUN; 73–75
Marikina (MAR)	SJK; 75–86	QZN; 79–85	ZAM; 84–89	ILA ^{(H)} 95–99*	CAL ^{(H)} 89–100	DLG; 84–79	MUN; 79–87	PSY; 69–75
Muntinlupa (MUN)	CAL ^{(A)} 66–74	DLG; 94–67	QZN; 76–90	ZAM; 86–73	PSY; 56–62	SJK; 73–81	MAR; 87–79	ILA; 75–73
Pasay (PSY)	ILA; 76–69	CAL ^{(H)} 63–71	MUN; 62–56	DLG; 79–60	QZN; 68–74	MAR; 75–69	SJK ^{(H)} 64–86	ZAM; 67–73
Quezon (QZN)	DLG; 116–80	MAR; 85–79	MUN; 90–76	ILA; 85–64	CAL; 60–74	PSY; 74–68	ZAM; 83–73	SJK; 72–69
San Juan (SJK)	MAR; 86–75	CAL; 65–59	ILA; 85–82	ZAM; 116–73	DLG; 122–59	MUN; 81–73	QZN; 69–72	PSY ^{(A)} 86–64
Zamboanga (ZAM)	MAR; 89–84	MUN; 73–86	SJK; 73–116	ILA; 63–78	CAL ^{(A)} 81–76	QZN; 73–83	DLG; 104–75	PSY; 73–67

Legend: Blue = win; Red = loss; Matches with lighter background shading were decided after overtime. (*) Number of asterisks denotes number of overtime periods

Notes

- Games that are played home or away are indicated by the superscript after the opposing team's abbreviation (H for home and A for away). Games with no superscript are neutral-site.

== Playoffs ==
The playoffs started on March 17 with knockout games and the semifinals on March 19. The finals was held on March 21.

=== Bracket ===
Knockout Round
B2	San Juan	68
B3	Caloocan	66
A2	Batangas City	85
A3	Mindoro	74

Semifinals
A1	Abra	76
B2	San Juan	72
B1	Quezon	76
A2	Batangas City	69

Finals
A1	Abra	67
B1	Quezon	47

=== Knockout Round ===
NOTE: All times are Philippine Standard Time (UTC+8:00).

YouTube

March 17
5:00 p.m.

Boxscore

Batangas City Tanduay Rum Masters	85–74	Mindoro Tamaraws
Scoring by quarter: 18–20, 22–17, 22–10, 23–27
Pts: Jhan Nermal 19; Rebs: Dawn Ochea 11; Asts: Abdul Sawat 5		Pts: JC Recto 21; Rebs: JJ Caspe 10; Asts: JC Recto 5

Playtime Filoil Centre, San Juan

YouTube

March 17
7:00 p.m.

Boxscore

Caloocan Batang Kankaloo	66–68	San Juan Knights
Scoring by quarter: 25–11, 18–25, 9–15, 14–17
Pts: Jeramer Cabanag, Joco Tayongtong 10; Rebs: Jielo Razon 10; Asts: Kean Baclaan 5		Pts: Harold Alarcon 23; Rebs: Michael Calisaan 10; Asts: Patrick Sleat 4

Playtime Filoil Centre, San Juan

=== Semifinals ===
YouTube

March 19
5:00 p.m.

Boxscore

Batangas City Tanduay Rum Masters	69–76	Quezon Huskers
Scoring by quarter: 15–30, 31–15, 15–15, 8–16
Pts: Wendelino Comboy 23; Rebs: Kraniel Villoria 9 Asts: three players 3		Pts: Michael Cañete, Judel Fuentes 15; Rebs: Cedrick Manzano 12; Asts: Judel Fuentes 4

Alonte Sports Arena, Biñan, Laguna

YouTube

March 19
7:00 p.m.

Boxscore

San Juan Knights	72–76	Abra Solid North Weavers
Scoring by quarter: 11–15, 26–11, 21–32, 14–18
Pts: Patrick Sleat 19; Rebs: Patrick Sleat 7 Asts: Orlan Wamar Jr. 7		Pts: Encho Serrano 18; Rebs: Dave Ildefonso 10; Asts: Mike Ayonayon 6

Alonte Sports Arena, Biñan, Laguna

=== Finals ===
YouTube

March 21
7:00 p.m.

Boxscore

Quezon Huskers	47–67	Abra Solid North Weavers
Scoring by quarter: 17–17, 9–11, 16–24, 5–15
Pts: Michael Cañete, Cedrick Manzano 12; Rebs: Cedrick Manzano 16; Asts: Christian Pagaran 4		Pts: Raven Gonzales 14; Rebs: Raven Gonzales 9 Asts: Dave Ildefonso 5

Bren Z. Guiao Convention Center, San Fernando, Pampanga
