= 2024 MPBL Preseason Invitational =

Preseason tournament for the Maharlika Pilipinas Basketball League's 2024 season

Tournament details
- Country: Philippines
- City: General Santos
- Venue: Lagao Gymnasium
- Dates: February 21–27, 2024
- Teams: 8

Final positions
- Champions: Pampanga Giant Lanterns
- Runners-up: South Cotabato Warriors
- Third place: Batangas City Athletics
- Fourth place: Quezon City Toda Aksyon

Tournament statistics
- Matches played: 16

The 2024 MPBL Preseason Invitational was the preseason pocket tournament for the Maharlika Pilipinas Basketball League's 2024 season and the third edition of the MPBL Preseason Invitational. The tournament began on February 21, 2024 and ended with the final game on February 27, 2024. The Pampanga Giant Lanterns were the tournament champions after defeating the South Cotabato Warriors with a score of 93–75.

Similar to the previous edition, the tournament was held at the Lagao Gymnasium in General Santos and used the same eight-team format as before. The tournament coincided with the city's Kalilangan Festival.

This is currently the most recent edition of the MPBL's preseason tournament, as the 2025 edition was cancelled in January of that year.

== Teams ==
A total of eight teams competed in the tournament. These include seven MPBL teams, as well as returning guest team GenSan Bulalakaw. Making their first Invitational appearances were the Bataan Risers, Pampanga Giant Lanterns, and Quezon City Toda Aksyon.

List of 2024 MPBL Preseason Invitational teams
Team	Invitational statistics			2023 season statistics	
Team	Apps.	Last	Best result	Record	Playoff result
Bataan Risers	1	—N/a		13–15 (.464)	–
Batangas City Athletics (Note: Competed as Batangas City Embassy Chill during the 2023 season. The name was later changed to Batangas City Tanduay Rum Masters for the 2024 season.)	2	2023	Group stage (2023)	22–6 (.786)	Division Finals
GenSan Bulalakaw (guest team)	2	2023	Group stage (2023)	—N/a	
Manila Stars (Note: The name was later changed to Manila Batang Sampaloc for the 2024 season.)	2	2021	Group stage (2021)	4–23 (.148)	–
Pampanga Giant Lanterns	1	—N/a		26–2 (.929)	Champion
Quezon City Toda Aksyon	1	—N/a		3–25 (.107)	–
South Cotabato Warriors (Note: Competed as GenSan Warriors during the 2023 season. The new name would remain for the 2024 season.)	3	2023	Group stage (2021, 2023)	21–7 (.750)	Division Semifinals
Valenzuela Classic (Note: Competed as Valenzuela XUR Homes Realty Inc. during the 2023 season. The new name would remain for the 2024 season.)	3	2023	Group stage (2021, 2023)	3–25 (.107)	–

== Format ==
The tournament was divided into two stages: the group stage and the playoffs. The eight participating teams were divided into two groups of four. Both groups play in a single round-robin format, wherein each team plays one game against all other teams within the same group. The top two teams in each group advance to a two-round, single-elimination playoffs consisting of all knockout games.

Every team was given prize money based on their standings: ₱1.5 million for the champion, ₱500,000 for the runner-up, ₱300,000 for the third-place team, ₱200,000 for the fourth-place team, and ₱125,000 for all non-playoff teams.

== Group stage ==
=== Group A ===
Pos	Team	Pld	W	L	PF	PA	PD	Qualification	SOC	BTG	BAN	MNL
1	South Cotabato Warriors	3	3	0	260	238	+22	Playoffs	—	81–79	88–75	91–84
2	Batangas City Athletics	3	2	1	259	215	+44	Playoffs	79–81	—	86–75	94–59
3	Bataan Risers	3	1	2	256	253	+3		75–88	75–86	—	106–79
4	Manila Stars	3	0	3	222	291	−69		84–91	59–94	79–106	—

Source: Schedule – via Genius Sports
Rules for classification: 1) Wins; 2a) If two teams are tied, head-to-head match-up; 2b) If three or more teams are tied, head-to-head point quotient; 3) overall point quotient; 4) coin toss.

Games

MPTV

February 21
4:00 pm

Boxscore

Manila Stars	79–106	Bataan Risers
Scoring by quarter: 11–26, 25–19, 17–33, 26–28
Pts: Peter Rosillo 18; Rebs: Anthony Umali 13; Asts: Peter Rosillo 7		Pts: Yves Sazon 20; Rebs: Jamil Gabawan 12; Asts: Kristoffer Torrado 8

Lagao Gymnasium, General Santos

MPTV

February 21
6:00 pm

Boxscore

South Cotabato Warriors	81–79	Batangas City Athletics
Scoring by quarter: 20–15, 20–17, 23–26, 18–21
Pts: Kyle Tolentino 21; Rebs: Felix Apreku 10; Asts: Felix Apreku 6		Pts: Juneric Baloria 17; Rebs: Jeckster Apinan 10; Asts: MJ dela Virgen 7

Lagao Gymnasium, General Santos

MPTV

February 22
6:00 pm

Boxscore

Batangas City Athletics	94–59	Manila Stars
Scoring by quarter: 31–12, 23–17, 23–11, 17–19
Pts: Cedric Ablaza 17; Rebs: Oliver Arim 14; Asts: CJ Isit 7		Pts: Shawn Umali 20; Rebs: Shawn Umali 13; Asts: Mark Yu, Peter Rosillo 3

Lagao Gymnasium, General Santos

MPTV

February 22
8:00 pm

Boxscore

Bataan Risers	75–88	South Cotabato Warriors
Scoring by quarter: 20–16, 12–23, 20–36, 23–13
Pts: Rhaffy Octubre 13; Rebs: Alex Ramos, Carl Bringas 8 Asts: Edrian Ramirez 5		Pts: John Wilson 28; Rebs: Christian Fajarito 14; Asts: Nico Elorde 8

Lagao Gymnasium, General Santos

MPTV

February 23
6:00 pm

Boxscore

South Cotabato Warriors	91–84	Manila Stars
Scoring by quarter: 27–19, 13–18, 26–21, 25–26
Pts: Jammer Jamito 21; Rebs: Christian Fajarito 9 Asts: Nico Elorde 7		Pts: Shawn Umali 29; Rebs: Shawn Umali 9 Asts: Peter Rosillo 6

Lagao Gymnasium, General Santos

MPTV

February 24
6:00 pm

Boxscore

Batangas City Athletics	86–75	Bataan Risers
Scoring by quarter: 19–31, 24–16, 19–8, 24–20
Pts: Levi Hernandez 22; Rebs: Cedric Ablaza 9 Asts: MJ dela Virgen 7		Pts: Mitchelle Maynes 23; Rebs: Mitchelle Maynes 10; Asts: Kristoffer Torrado 4

Lagao Gymnasium, General Santos

=== Group B ===
Pos	Team	Pld	W	L	PF	PA	PD	Qualification	PAM	QC	VAL	GSB
1	Pampanga Giant Lanterns	3	3	0	285	223	+62	Playoffs	—	73–68	103–80	109–75
2	Quezon City Toda Aksyon	3	1 (Note: Quezon City (1.119), Valenzuela (1.063), and GenSan (0.832) are ranked based on head-to-head point quotient.)	2	247	233	+14	Playoffs	68–73	—	99–77	80–83
3	Valenzuela Classic	3	1	2	250	263	−13		80–103	77–99	—	93–61
4	GenSan Bulalakaw	3	1	2	219	282	−63		75–109	83–80	61–93	—

Source: Schedule – via Genius Sports
Rules for classification: 1) Wins; 2a) If two teams are tied, head-to-head match-up; 2b) If three or more teams are tied, head-to-head point quotient; 3) overall point quotient; 4) coin toss.
Notes:

Games

MPTV

February 21
8:00 pm

Boxscore

Valenzuela Classic	93–61	GenSan Bulalakaw
Scoring by quarter: 29–21, 23–9, 19–16, 22–15
Pts: Nhazer Mohammad 15; Rebs: Bryan Boliver 15; Asts: Darell Manliguez 4		Pts: Manny Pacquiao 19; Rebs: Victor Nguidjol 10; Asts: Victor Nguidjol, David Sisson 3

Lagao Gymnasium, General Santos

MPTV

February 22
4:00 pm

Boxscore

Quezon City Toda Aksyon	68–73	Pampanga Giant Lanterns
Scoring by quarter: 13–14, 17–16, 18–21, 20–22
Pts: Jonas Tibayan 13; Rebs: Jason Ballesteros 8 Asts: Rafael Are 4		Pts: Jhaymo Eguilos 13; Rebs: Justine Baltazar 21; Asts: Encho Serrano 8

Lagao Gymnasium, General Santos

MPTV

February 23
4:00 pm

Boxscore

Pampanga Giant Lanterns	103–80	Valenzuela Classic
Scoring by quarter: 25–25, 30–20, 24–11, 24–24
Pts: Jeff Viernes 22; Rebs: Justine Baltazar 11; Asts: MJ Garcia 5		Pts: Dennis Santos 18; Rebs: Bryan Boliver 8 Asts: Darrell Manliguez 5

Lagao Gymnasium, General Santos

MPTV

February 23
8:00 pm

Boxscore

Quezon City Toda Aksyon	80–83	GenSan Bulalakaw
Scoring by quarter: 11–23, 24–9, 17–26, 28–25
Pts: Rhinwill Yambing 18; Rebs: Kenji Roman 11; Asts: Camillus Altamirano 9		Pts: Victor Nguidjol 31; Rebs: Don Diamante 13; Asts: David Sisson 5

Lagao Gymnasium, General Santos

MPTV

February 24
4:00 pm

Boxscore

Valenzuela Classic	77–99	Quezon City Toda Aksyon
Scoring by quarter: 25–30, 7–20, 21–22, 24–27
Pts: Ryan Trazona 18; Rebs: Dennis Santos 8 Asts: Darrell Manliguez 6		Pts: Rhinwill Yambing 24; Rebs: Kenji Roman 10; Asts: Kenji Roman 6

Lagao Gymnasium, General Santos

MPTV

February 24
8:00 pm

Boxscore

Pampanga Giant Lanterns	109–75	GenSan Bulalakaw
Scoring by quarter: 23–21, 23–24, 31–14, 32–16
Pts: Rence Alcoriza 16; Rebs: Justine Baltazar 15; Asts: Kurt Reyson 8		Pts: Victor Nguidjol 27; Rebs: Victor Nguidjol 8 Asts: Manny Pacquiao 5

Lagao Gymnasium, General Santos

== Playoffs ==
=== Bracket ===
Semifinals
A1	South Cotabato	84
B2	Quezon City	79
B1	Pampanga	78
A2	Batangas City	59

Finals
A1	South Cotabato	75
B1	Pampanga	93
Battle for Third
B2	Quezon City	60
A2	Batangas City	68

=== Semifinals ===
MPTV

February 25
6:00 pm

Boxscore

Pampanga Giant Lanterns	78–59	Batangas City Athletics
Scoring by quarter: 15–11, 18–15, 16–22, 29–11
Pts: Justine Baltazar 17; Rebs: Justine Baltazar 17; Asts: Encho Serrano 4		Pts: Cedric Ablaza 14; Rebs: Jeckster Apinan 11; Asts: CJ Isit 4

Lagao Gymnasium, General Santos

MPTV

February 25
8:00 pm

Boxscore

South Cotabato Warriors	84–79	Quezon City Toda Aksyon
Scoring by quarter: 13–22, 22–13, 20–14, 29–30
Pts: John Wilson 23; Rebs: Christian Fajarito 9 Asts: Nico Elorde 8		Pts: Rafael Are 20; Rebs: Jason Ballesteros 10; Asts: Camillus Altamirano 6

Lagao Gymnasium, General Santos

=== Battle for Third ===
MPTV

February 27
6:00 pm

Boxscore

Batangas City Athletics	68–60	Quezon City Toda Aksyon
Scoring by quarter: 20–12, 10–19, 20–24, 18–15
Pts: RJ Ramirez 11; Rebs: Jeckster Apinan 13; Asts: MJ dela Virgen 5		Pts: Rhinwill Yambing 15; Rebs: Jason Ballesteros 9 Asts: Rafael Are 3

Lagao Gymnasium, General Santos

=== Finals ===
MPTV

February 27
8:00 pm

Boxscore

Pampanga Giant Lanterns	93–75	South Cotabato Warriors
Scoring by quarter: 20–13, 27–20, 32–15, 14–27
Pts: Encho Serrano 29; Rebs: Justine Baltazar 17; Asts: Kurt Reyson 8		Pts: John Wilson 26; Rebs: Christian Fajarito 8 Asts: Mark Cruz 5

Lagao Gymnasium, General Santos

The Pampanga Giant Lanterns became the first Luzon-based team to win an MPBL Invitational championship, as the previous two (Basilan and Zamboanga) were all based in Mindanao.

Unlike previous Invitational tournaments, no Most Valuable Player award was given out at the conclusion of the tournament. Pampanga's Encho Serrano was declared the Player of the Game in the Finals.

== Media ==
This is the second MPBL Invitational under Cignal TV's ongoing broadcast partnership with the league. The games are broadcast on Media Pilipinas TV (MPTV) on television and are streamed live via Pilipinas Live. The league continues to stream all of the games online on Facebook and YouTube.
