= Renz Palma =

Filipino basketball player

No. 77 – Nueva Ecija Granary Buffalos
- Position: Shooting guard / Small forward

Personal information
- Born: March 16, 1992 (age 34)
- Listed height: 6 ft 1 in (1.85 m)

Career information
- College: UE
- PBA draft: 2017: 2nd round, 15th overall pick
- Drafted by: Blackwater Elite
- Playing career: 2017–present

Career history
- 2017–2019: Blackwater Elite
- 2021: Kapatagan Buffalo Braves
- 2021–2023: Nueva Ecija Rice Vanguards / Capitals
- 2024: Negros Muscovados
- 2025: Pampanga Giant Lanterns
- 2026: Nueva Ecija Granary Buffalos

Career highlights
- MPBL champion (2022); MPBL All-Star (2024); FilBasket champion (Summer 2022)

Emil Renz Palma (born March 16, 1992) is a Filipino professional basketball player who last played for Pampanga Giant Lanterns of the Maharlika Pilipinas Basketball League (MPBL).

A UE Red Warrior in college, Palma was selected with the 15th overall pick by the Blackwater Elite in the 2017 PBA draft. In 2021, Palma moved to the Pilipinas VisMin Super Cup and played for the Kapatagan Buffalo Braves before moving to the Nueva Ecija Rice Vanguards franchise later that year. He won two professional championships with the team. In 2024, he moved to the Negros Muscovados.

== College career ==
In college, Palma played for the UE Red Warriors.

== Professional career ==
=== Blackwater Elite (2017–2019) ===
In 2017, after playing for the Tanduay Light Rhum Masters in the PBA D-League, Palma was selected by the Blackwater Elite with the 15th pick of the 2017 PBA draft. He played with the Blackwater franchise for two seasons.

=== Kapatagan Buffalo Braves (2021) ===
In 2021, he played for the Kapatagan Buffalo Braves of the newly founded Pilipinas VisMin Super Cup.

=== Nueva Ecija Rice Vanguards franchise (2021–2023) ===
On March 3, 2020, Renz Palma signed a deal with the Nueva Ecija Rice Vanguards of the Maharlika Pilipinas Basketball League (MPBL). The COVID-19 pandemic suspended league play for over a year and Palma wouldn't make his debut with his hometown team until the 2021 MPBL Invitational. During his time with Nueva Ecija, Palma won two championships, one during FilBasket's 2022 Summer Championship and the other during the 2022 MPBL finals.

=== Negros Muscovados (2024) ===
In 2024, Palma moved to the Negros Muscovados.

== Career statistics ==
=== PBA ===
Legend
GP	Games played	MPG	Minutes per game
FG%	Field-goal percentage	3P%	3-point field-goal percentage	FT%	Free-throw percentage
RPG	Rebounds per game	APG	Assists per game	SPG	Steals per game
BPG	Blocks per game	PPG	Points per game	**Bold**	Career high

As of the end of 2019 season

==== Season-by-season averages ====
Year	Team	GP	MPG	FG%	3P%	FT%	RPG	APG	SPG	BPG	PPG
2017–18	Blackwater	**21**	**0.9**	**.436**	**.333**	**.696**	**1.8**	**.7**	.8	**.3**	**3.3**
2019	Blackwater	6	7.0	.348	.000	.000	1.3	—	**1.0**	.2	2.7

=== MPBL ===
Legend
GP	Games played	GS	Games started	MPG	Minutes per game
FG%	Field-goal percentage	3P%	3-point field-goal percentage	FT%	Free-throw percentage
RPG	Rebounds per game	APG	Assists per game	SPG	Steals per game
BPG	Blocks per game	PPG	Points per game	**Bold**	Career high

As of the end of 2023 season

==== Season-by-season averages ====
Year	Team	GP	GS	MPG	FG%	3P%	FT%	RPG	APG	SPG	BPG	PPG
2022	Nueva Ecija	**31**	8	**14.5**	.387	.156	.552	2.6	2.6	**1.4**	.1	4.5
2023	Nueva Ecija	24	**11**	13.7	**.523**	**.290**	**.615**	**2.9**	**1.9**	.8	**.3**	**5.4**
