= Teytey Teodoro =

Filipino basketball player (born 1993)

Free agent
- Position: Point guard / Shooting guard

Personal information
- Born: August 21, 1993 (age 33)
- Listed height: 5 ft 10 in (1.78 m)
- Listed weight: 185 lb (84 kg)

Career information
- College: JRU
- PBA draft: 2018: 3rd round, 23rd overall pick
- Drafted by: Columbian Dyip
- Playing career: 2018–present

Career history
- 2018: Batangas City Athletics
- 2019: Barangay Ginebra San Miguel
- 2020: Batangas City Athletics
- 2021: Kapatagan Buffalo Braves
- 2021: Bulacan Kuyas
- 2022–2023: Mindoro Tams / Disiplinados
- 2023–2024: RCP–Shawarma Shack Demigods
- 2024: Mindoro Tamaraws

Career highlights
- PBA champion (2019 Governors'); MPBL champion (2018)

Bernabe "Teytey" Teodoro (born August 21, 1993) is a Filipino professional basketball player who last played for the Mindoro Tamaraws of the Maharlika Pilipinas Basketball League (MPBL).

== College and pre-PBA career ==
=== JRU Heavy Bombers ===
Teodoro played for the JRU Heavy Bombers during his college career.

=== Batangas City Athletics (2018) ===
In 2018, Teodoro joined the Batangas City Athletics, where he was a key player in the team's 2018 championship run.

== PBA career ==
=== Barangay Ginebra San Miguel (2019) ===
In the 2018 PBA draft, Teytey was drafted by the Columbian Dyip with the 23rd pick, but didn't sign with the team. Instead, he would attempt at making the roster of the Barangay Ginebra San Miguel, and on January 10, 2019, he signed a one-conference deal to play for Ginebra.

On May 13, 2019, he signed a deal that would keep him with Ginebra for the rest of the 2019 PBA season, after which Ginebra decided not to renew him. Teodoro won a championship with Ginebra after their win in the 2019 PBA Governors' Cup finals.

== Post-PBA career ==
=== Return to Batangas City (2020) ===
Teytey then returned to the MPBL, once again playing for the Batangas City Athletics.

=== Kapatagan Buffalo Braves (2021) ===
In 2021, Teodoro signed with the Kapatagan Buffalo Braves of the Pilipinas VisMin Super Cup, thus returning to the professional ranks.

=== Bulacan Kuyas (2021) ===
After his VisMin stint, he would then move back to the MPBL where he played for the Bulacan Kuyas during the 2021 MPBL Invitational.

=== Mindoro Tamaraws (2022–present) ===
In 2022, Teodoro moved to the Mindoro Tams.

== Career statistics ==
=== PBA ===
Legend
GP	Games played	MPG	Minutes per game
FG%	Field-goal percentage	3P%	3-point field-goal percentage	FT%	Free-throw percentage
RPG	Rebounds per game	APG	Assists per game	SPG	Steals per game
BPG	Blocks per game	PPG	Points per game	**Bold**	Career high

As of the end of 2019 season

==== Season-by-season averages ====
Year	Team	GP	MPG	FG%	3P%	FT%	RPG	APG	SPG	BPG	PPG
2019	Barangay Ginebra	20	4.3	.324	.292	1.000	.4	.3	.1	—	1.7
Career		20	4.3	.324	.292	1.000	.4	.3	.1	—	1.7

=== MPBL ===
Legend
GP	Games played	GS	Games started	MPG	Minutes per game
FG%	Field-goal percentage	3P%	3-point field-goal percentage	FT%	Free-throw percentage
RPG	Rebounds per game	APG	Assists per game	SPG	Steals per game
BPG	Blocks per game	PPG	Points per game	**Bold**	Career high

As of the end of 2023 season

==== Season-by-season averages ====
Year	Team	GP	GS	MPG	FG%	3P%	FT%	RPG	APG	SPG	BPG	PPG
2018	Batangas City	17	0	22.3	.378	.321	.652	2.6	**2.5**	.5	**.1**	10.7
2018–19	Batangas City	18	3	20.6	.341	.299	**.737**	**2.9**	1.6	.2	**.1**	9.3
2019–20	Batangas City	5	3	18.8	**.357**	.278	.500	2.0	.8	.4	—	5.4
2022	Mindoro	12	7	23.5	.328	.259	.667	2.8	2.3	**.7**	—	9.4
2023	Mindoro	**21**	**19**	**24.7**	.348	**.367**	.667	2.8	1.8	**.7**	**.1**	**11.5**
