= MPBL Preseason Invitational =

Preseason tournament of the Maharlika Pilipinas Basketball League

- Founded: 2021
- Number of teams: varies
- Current champions: Abra Solid North Weavers (2026)
- Most championships: four teams (1 title each)
- 2026 MPBL Preseason Invitational

The MPBL Preseason Invitational is a preseason tournament held before the Maharlika Pilipinas Basketball League (MPBL) regular season. The tournament was first held in 2021, intended to make up for the long gap between the 2019–20 and 2022 seasons. The Preseason Invitational returned with a smaller eight-team format in 2023 and 2024. After a hiatus in 2025, the event is set to make a comeback in 2026, returning to a bigger-scale tournament.

== History ==
The COVID-19 pandemic forced the league to temporarily suspend league play on March 12, 2020, in the midst of its 2020 playoffs. The league also cancelled its plans to start its fourth season in June of that year and instead aimed for a return in June 2021, which also didn't push through.

As the league began its transition to professional status, it also looked to start an invitational tournament in December. On November 16, 2021, during the online Philippine Sportswriters Association Forum, league commissioner Kenneth Duremdes formally announced the Invitational as the league settled on starting its fourth season in 2022. The tournament would also be supervised by the Games and Amusements Board (GAB) and monitored by FIBA.

The 2021 MPBL Invitational went underway on December 11, 2021. It was the first event of the MPBL under professional status. The entire tournament was held at SM Mall of Asia Arena in Pasay and fans were allowed in the arena at 50-percent capacity, though tickets were only provided to the participating teams to give to fans. The inaugural tournament featured 22 teams and was won by Basilan Jumbo Plastic.

The Invitational has since become the league's preseason tournament in the seasons that followed. The next two editions of the Invitational (2023 and 2024) took place at Lagao Gymnasium in General Santos. The tournament is now held every February to align with the city's Kalilangan Festival. This is also the only event in the league's calendar to feature guest teams. Since 2023, the GenSan Bulalakaw, a General Santos-based club, have become a regular competitors at the tournament. Now renamed as the MPBL Preseason Invitational, the Zamboanga Family's Brand Sardines won the 2023 edition while the Pampanga Giant Lanterns won the 2024 edition.

On January 23, 2025, the league announced that it would cancel plans to hold a preseason tournament for the 2025 season. Exactly one year later, on January 23, 2026, the league announced the event's comeback with the 2026 Preseason Invitational, returning to a bigger-scale format with 18 teams expected to compete from February 7 to March 21. Unlike previous Invitationals, games during the 2026 edition are set to be held in venues across Mega Manila, rather than a single venue throughout.

== Format ==
The format of the Preseason Invitational follows that of traditional FIBA tournaments. Since 2023, each tournament consists of eight teams that are divided into two groups of four teams. Each team plays one game against each team from within the same group. The top two teams advance to the single-elimination playoffs, where the top four positions are settled.

=== Prize pot ===
The Preseason Invitational also features a prize pot, which is included in every tournament to date. In 2021, only the top three teams were given prize money. This was changed in 2023 so that every team is given prize money.

In 2026, instead of a prize pot, the six teams that will make the playoffs will have their entry fees for the 2026 MPBL season cut in half. The two teams that will make the finals will have their entry fees waived by the league.

Rank	2021	2023	2024
1st	₱2,000,000	₱3,000,000	₱1,500,000
2nd	₱500,000		
3rd	₱250,000	₱300,000	
4th	—N/a	₱200,000	
5th–8th	—N/a	₱100,000	₱125,000

== List of tournaments ==
Year	City	Venue	Finalists			Semifinalists			Ref.
Year	City	Venue	Champion	Score	Runner-up	Third place	Score	Fourth place	Ref.
2021	Pasay	SM Mall of Asia Arena	Basilan Jumbo Plastic	83–80 (OT)	Nueva Ecija Rice Vanguards	Pasig Sta. Lucia Realtors	100–80	Imus Buracai de Laiya	
2023	General Santos	Lagao Gymnasium	Zamboanga Family's Brand Sardines	88–80	Nueva Ecija Rice Vanguards	Imus SV Squad	93–76	Sarangani Marlins	
2024	General Santos	Lagao Gymnasium	Pampanga Giant Lanterns	93–75	South Cotabato Warriors	Batangas City Athletics	68–60	Quezon City Toda Aksyon	
2026	Mega Manila	Various venues	Abra Solid North Weavers	67–47	Quezon Huskers	Not held			
