= Dennice Villamor =

Filipino basketball player (born 1990)

Free agent
- Position: Power forward

Personal information
- Born: July 1, 1990 (age 36) San Pablo, Laguna, Philippines
- Listed height: 6 ft 4 in (1.93 m)
- Listed weight: 195 lb (88 kg)

Career information
- College: NU
- PBA draft: 2015: 3rd round, 28th overall pick
- Drafted by: Barangay Ginebra San Miguel
- Playing career: 2015–present

Career history
- 2015–2016: Barangay Ginebra San Miguel
- 2018–2019: Batangas City Athletics
- 2024: Pangasinan Heatwaves
- 2024: Caloocan Batang Kankaloo

Career highlights
- PBA champion (2016 Governors'); MPBL champion (2018)

Lee Dennice Alimagno Villamor (born July 1, 1990) is a Filipino professional basketball player who last played for the Caloocan Batang Kankaloo of the Maharlika Pilipinas Basketball League (MPBL). He was drafted as the 28th overall pick by the Barangay Ginebra San Miguel in the 2015 PBA draft. In 2018, he would then join the Batangas City Athletics for the MPBL's inaugural season.
