= List of MPBL champions =

The MPBL finals is the championship series of the Maharlika Pilipinas Basketball League held at the conclusion of the league's postseason. Since its inception, the national finals is a best-of-five series. Since the 2019 edition, it is contested between the champions of the North Division and the South Division. The finals is structured in a 2–2–1 format, where the team with the better regular season record is given homecourt advantage and hosts games 1, 2, and 5.

Six different teams have won the national championship with the Pampanga Giant Lanterns being the only team to win it multiple times. Since the introduction of divisions, four teams did so as a member of the North Division, while one did so as a member of the South Division.

== Champions ==
=== Season ===
The first parenthesis indicate the teams' playoff seed within their division. The second parenthesis indicate the number of times that team has appeared in the MPBL finals, as well as each respective teams' MPBL finals record up to date.

Additionally, the winning coach of each series is awarded the league's Coach of the Year award.

North Division champion	South Division champion

Year	Winning team	Coach	Series	Losing team	Coach	Finals MVP	Ref.
2018; Rajah Cup	Batangas City Athletics (1) (1, 1–0)	Mac Tan	3–1	Muntinlupa Cagers (3) (1, 0–1)	Aldrin Morante	Val Acuña	
2019; Datu Cup	San Juan Knights (3) (1, 1–0)	Randy Alcantara	3–2	Davao Occidental Tigers (1) (1, 0–1)	Don Dulay	Mike Ayonayon	
2021 (Note: Postponed from 2020 due to the COVID-19 pandemic.); Lakan Season	Davao Occidental Tigers (1) (2, 1–1)	Don Dulay	3–1	San Juan Knights (1) (2, 1–1)	Randy Alcantara	Mark Yee	
2022	Nueva Ecija Rice Vanguards (1) (1, 1–0)	Jerson Cabiltes	3–1	Zamboanga Family's Brand Sardines (1) (1, 0–1)	Vic Ycasiano	Byron Villarias	
2023	Pampanga Giant Lanterns (1) (1, 1–0)	Dennis Pineda	3–0	Bacoor City Strikers (1) (1, 0–1)	Alex Angeles	Justine Baltazar (1)	
2024	Pampanga Giant Lanterns (2) (2, 2–0)	Dennis Pineda	3–0	Quezon Huskers (1) (1, 0–1)	Eric Gonzales	Justine Baltazar (2)	
2025	Abra Solid North Weavers (1) (1, 1–0)	Yong Garcia	3–0	Quezon Huskers (1) (2, 0–2)	Eric Gonzales	Jason Brickman	

=== Preseason Invitational ===
The league's annual Preseason Invitational culminates in a single game to determine the champion of the tournament.

Year	Winning team	Coach	Score	Losing team	Coach	Ref.
2021	Basilan Jumbo Plastic (1, 1–0)	Jerson Cabiltes	83–80 (OT)	Nueva Ecija Rice Vanguards (1, 0–1)	Carlo Tan	
2023	Zamboanga Family's Brand Sardines (1, 1–0)	Vic Ycasiano	88–80	Nueva Ecija Rice Vanguards (2, 0–2)	Jerson Cabiltes	
2024	Pampanga Giant Lanterns (1, 1–0)	Dennis Pineda	93–75	South Cotabato Warriors (1, 0–1)	Elvis Tolentino	
2026	Abra Solid North Weavers (1, 1–0)	Yong Garcia	67–47	Quezon Huskers (1, 0–1)	Eric Gonzales	

== Results by franchise ==
†	Team has since departed the league

=== Season ===
Team	W	L	Apps.	PCT	Year(s) won	Year(s) lost
Pampanga†	2	0	2	1.000	2023, 2024	–
Davao Occidental†	1	1	2	.500	2021	2019
San Juan	1	1	2	.500	2019	2021
Batangas City	1	0	1	1.000	2018	–
Nueva Ecija†	1	0	1	1.000	2022	–
Abra	1	0	1	1.000	2025	–
Muntinlupa	0	1	1	.000	–	2018
Zamboanga	0	1	1	.000	–	2022
Bacoor City†	0	1	1	.000	–	2023
Quezon	0	2	2	.000	–	2024, 2025

=== Preseason Invitational ===
Team	W	L	Apps.	PCT	Year(s) won	Year(s) lost
Basilan	1	0	1	1.000	2021	–
Zamboanga	1	0	1	1.000	2023	–
Pampanga†	1	0	1	1.000	2024	–
Abra	1	0	1	1.000	2026	–
Nueva Ecija†	0	2	2	.000	–	2021, 2023
South Cotabato	0	1	1	.000	–	2024
Quezon	0	1	1	.000	–	2026

== Championships by player ==
The teams provided were the teams that the player were part of the championship roster. Bold denotes active player in the MPBL.

Player	Total	Team
**Encho Serrano**	3	Pampanga (2), Abra (1)

== See also ==
- MPBL Finals Most Valuable Player award
