= 2023 MPBL Preseason Invitational =

Preseason tournament for the Maharlika Pilipinas Basketball League's 2023 season

2023 OKBet MPBL Preseason Invitational

Tournament details
- Country: Philippines
- City: General Santos
- Venue(s): Lagao Gymnasium
- Dates: February 21–27, 2023
- Teams: 8

Final positions
- Champions: Zamboanga Family's Brand Sardines
- Runner-up: Nueva Ecija Rice Vanguards
- Third place: Imus SV Squad
- Fourth place: Sarangani Marlins

Tournament statistics
- Matches played: 16

The 2023 MPBL Preseason Invitational was the preseason pocket tournament for the Maharlika Pilipinas Basketball League's 2023 season and the second edition of the MPBL Preseason Invitational. The tournament began February 21, 2023 and ended with the final game on February 27, 2023 when the Zamboanga Family's Brand Sardines beat the Nueva Ecija Rice Vanguards, 88–80. Dexter Maiquez was crowned the tournament's MVP.

The tournament was once again held at a single venue, this time being the Lagao Gymnasium in General Santos, home of the GenSan Warriors, with a format is similar to that of the previous edition, albeit downsized to accommodate the smaller pool of teams.

== Teams ==
A total of eight teams competed in the tournament. These include seven MPBL teams, as well as Bulalakaw, a local team based in General Santos, as the league’s first-ever guest team. Making their first Invitational appearances were the Batangas City Embassy Chill (competing as the Batangas City Tanduay Rum Masters) and Zamboanga Family's Brand Sardines.

List of 2023 MPBL Preseason Invitational teams
Team	Invitational statistics			2022 season statistics	
Team	Apps.	Last	Best result	Record	Playoff result
Batangas City Tanduay Rum Masters (Note: Competed as Batangas City Embassy Chill during the 2022 season. The name change was only made temporary for the Preseason Invitational.)	1	—		17–4 (.810)	Division Finals
Bulalakaw (guest team)	1	—		—	
GenSan Warriors	2	2021	Group stage (2021)	15–6 (.714)	Division Quarterfinals
Imus SV Squad (Note: Competed as Imus City Bandera during the 2022 season. The new name would remain for the 2023 season.)	2	2021	Fourth place (2021)	5–16 (.238)	–
Nueva Ecija Rice Vanguards	2	2021	Runner-up (2021)	21–0 (1.000)	Champion
Sarangani Marlins	2	2021	Group stage (2021)	16–5 (.762)	Division Quarterfinals
Valenzuela XUR Homes Realty Inc.	2	2021	Group stage (2021)	10–11 (.476)	Division Quarterfinals
Zamboanga Family's Brand Sardines	1	—		18–3 (.857)	National Finals

== Format ==
The tournament is divided into two stages: the group stage and the playoffs. The eight participating teams are divided into two groups of four. Both groups play in a single round-robin format, wherein each team plays one game against all other teams within the same group. The top two teams in each group advance to a two-round, single-elimination playoffs consisting of all knockout games.

This time around, every team was given prize money based on their standings: ₱3 million for the champion, ₱500,000 for the runner-up, ₱300,000 for the third-place team, ₱200,000 for the fourth-place team, and ₱100,000 for all non-playoff teams.

== Group stage ==
=== Group A ===
Pos	Team	Pld	W	L	PF	PA	PD	Qualification	ZAM	SAR	BLL	BTG
1	Zamboanga Family's Brand Sardines	3	2 (Note: Zamboanga wins tiebreaker over Sarangani by head-to-head victory.)	1	277	248	+29	Playoffs	—	92–85	102–75	83–88
2	Sarangani Marlins	3	2	1	284	268	+16	Playoffs	85–92	—	106–86	93–90
3	Bulalakaw	3	1 (Note: Bulalakaw wins tiebreaker over Batangas City by head-to-head victory.)	2	233	278	−45		75–102	86–106	—	72–70
4	Batangas City Tanduay Rum Masters	3	1	2	248	248	0		88–83	90–93	70–72	—

Source: Schedule – via Genius Sports
Rules for classification: 1) Wins; 2a) If two teams are tied, head-to-head match-up; 2b) If three or more teams are tied, head-to-head point quotient; 3) overall point quotient; 4) coin toss.

=== Group B ===
Pos	Team	Pld	W	L	PF	PA	PD	Qualification	NE	IMS	GS	VAL
1	Nueva Ecija Rice Vanguards	3	3	0	255	209	+46	Playoffs	—	88–78	73–67	94–64
2	Imus SV Squad	3	2	1	244	214	+30	Playoffs	78–88	—	78–61	88–65
3	GenSan Warriors	3	1	2	210	224	−14		67–73	61–78	—	82–73
4	Valenzuela XUR Homes Realty Inc.	3	0	3	202	264	−62		64–94	65–88	73–82	—

Source: Schedule – via Genius Sports
Rules for classification: 1) Wins; 2a) If two teams are tied, head-to-head match-up; 2b) If three or more teams are tied, head-to-head point quotient; 3) overall point quotient; 4) coin toss.

== Playoffs ==
=== Bracket ===
Semifinals
A1	Zamboanga	89
B2	Imus	82
B1	Nueva Ecija	112
A2	Sarangani	89

Finals
A1	Zamboanga	88
B1	Nueva Ecija	80
Battle for Third
B2	Imus	93
A2	Sarangani	76

=== Semifinals ===
One PH
One Sports+

February 25
7:00 pm

Boxscore

Zamboanga Family's Brand Sardines	89–82	Imus SV Squad
Scoring by quarter: 21–23, 22–20, 24–28, 22–11
Pts: Judel Fuentes 21; Rebs: Judel Fuentes 9 Asts: Judel Fuentes, Jayvee Marcelino 6		Pts: Mark Cardona 24; Rebs: Jaymar Gimpayan 16; Asts: Mark Cardona, Jaymar Gimpayan 5

Lagao Gymnasium, General Santos, South Cotabato

One PH
One Sports+

February 25
9:00 pm

Boxscore

Nueva Ecija Rice Vanguards	112–89	Sarangani Marlins
Scoring by quarter: 21–16, 32–25, 28–20, 31–28
Pts: John Villarias 18; Rebs: William McAloney 7 Asts: Four players 4		Pts: Nemesis Dela Cruz 18; Rebs: Anthony Sistoza 8 Asts: Alex Desoyo 5

Lagao Gymnasium, General Santos, South Cotabato

=== Battle for Third ===
One PH
One Sports+

February 27
7:00 pm

Boxscore

Imus SV Squad	93–76	Sarangani Marlins
Scoring by quarter: 18–11, 24–20, 27–14, 24–31
Pts: Jaymar Gimpayan 22; Rebs: Jaymar Gimpayan 20; Asts: Jayjay Helterbrand 11		Pts: Orin Catacutan 17; Rebs: Marc Poole 7 Asts: Rafael Are 5

Lagao Gymnasium, General Santos, South Cotabato

=== Finals ===
One PH
One Sports+

February 27
9:00 pm

Boxscore

Nueva Ecija Rice Vanguards	80–88	Zamboanga Family's Brand Sardines
Scoring by quarter: 13–30, 21–20, 23–19, 23–19
Pts: Michael Juico 15; Rebs: Michael Juico 8 Asts: Chris Bitoon 5		Pts: Dexter Maiquez 29; Rebs: three players 7 Asts: Jerald Bautista, Judel Fuentes 5

Lagao Gymnasium, General Santos, South Cotabato

== Media ==
This was the first MPBL Invitational under Cignal TV's ongoing broadcast partnership with the league. The games were broadcast on One PH and One Sports+ on television. The league streamed all of the games online on Facebook and YouTube.
