= Jeff Viernes =

Filipino basketball player and coach

Personal information
- Born: May 18, 1989 (age 37) Isabela, Philippines
- Listed height: 5 ft 7 in (1.70 m)
- Listed weight: 143 lb (65 kg)

Career information
- College: Metro Manila College (2009); University of Manila (2009–2013); St. Claire College–Caloocan (2012–2013)
- PBA draft: 2013: Undrafted
- Playing career: 2016–present
- Position: Point guard

Career history

Playing
- 2016: Singapore Slingers
- 2017: Phoenix Fuel Masters
- 2017: NS Matrix
- 2018: Hi-Tech Bangkok City
- 2018: GlobalPort Batang Pier
- 2018–2020: Batangas City Athletics
- 2022–2023: NS Matrix
- 2023: Sarangani Marlins
- 2024: Pampanga Giant Lanterns
- 2025: Basilan Viva Portmasters
- 2025: Sarangani Gripper Motorcycle Tire

Coaching
- 2022–2023: NS Matrix
- 2022–2023: Malaysia

Career highlights
- MPBL champion (2024); 2× MPBL All-Star (2019, 2020); 2× MPBL All-Star Game MVP (2019, 2020); PBA D-League MVP (2018 Foundation Cup)

Jeff Alvin Dumelod Viernes (born May 18, 1989) is a Filipino professional basketball player who last played for the Sarangani Gripper Motorcycle Tire of the Maharlika Pilipinas Basketball League (MPBL). He also served as head coach from 2022 to 2023.

== Early life ==
Viernes was born on May 18, 1989, in the province of Isabela. He hails from the town of Delfin Albano. He was inspired to take up basketball after watching Michael Jordan figure for the Chicago Bulls against the Utah Jazz in the Game 6 of the 1998 NBA Finals.

== Playing career ==
=== Collegiate career ===
Viernes started his playing career for Metro Manila College in 2009 before moving to the University of Manila to play for the UM Hawks of the National Athletic Association of Schools, Colleges and Universities (NAASCU). In 2009, Viernes was named Rookie of the Year. In 2011, he was named season MVP. However Viernes moved to St. Claire College in Caloocan the following year after UM's decision to take a leave of absence from the NAASCU. He then suited up for the St. Clare College Saints. He would graduate from St. Clare by 2013.

=== Amateur career ===
After graduation, Viernes played for the Boracay Rum Waves in the PBA D-League in 2013. He would enter the November draft for the Philippine Basketball Association (PBA) but withdrew. He would return to the D-League and play for Racal Motors (later renamed KeraMix Mixers) He would also play for the Jumbo Plastic Linoleum Giants helping the team win the 2016 PCBL title. The Singapore Slingers would include him in their roster on a trial basis for the 2016 Merlion Cup, potentially signing him for the upcoming 2016–17 ABL season.

=== Professional career ===
==== Phoenix Fuel Masters ====
Viernes would break into the PBA, joining the Phoenix Fuel Masters in 2017. However his stint was cut short after he took part in a ligang labas. He played under Hobe Macway Travel in the Republica Cup under a pseudonym and without sanction from his PBA club. He was fined and requested his release from the team. He only played one game for Phoenix.

==== NS Matrix and Hi-Tech Bangkok City ====
Malaysian club NS Matrix would invite Viernes to play for them in the 2017 Seri Mutiara Cup. He would return to play in the 2018 edition although Matrix failed to progress to the semifinal with Viernes sustaining an injury. He would also ply his trade in Thailand as part of Hi-Tech Bangkok City.

==== Return to the PBA D-League ====
After his stint in Thailand, Viernes would return to the Philippines to play for the Che'Lu Bar & Grill Revellers of the PBA D-League. He would aid the team in reaching the 2018 PBA D-League Aspirants' Cup finals. However he would not take part in the final series against Zark's–Lyceum after he was signed by a PBA team.

==== GlobalPort Batang Pier ====
Viernes would return to the PBA after GlobalPort Batang Pier signed him in the lead up to the 2018 PBA Commissioner's Cup which started in April. However he was quickly replaced after featuring in two games after GlobalPort brought in Paolo Javelona to the team in May 8.

==== Return to Che'Lu ====
After his brief second PBA stint, Viernes would return to the Revellers. He would lead the team to a runner-up finish in the 2018 PBA D-League Foundation Cup. Despite his team losing to the Go For Gold Scratchers in the final, Viernes was named as conference MVP becoming the first ex-professional to be given the distinction.

==== MPBL (2018–present) ====
From 2018 to 2020, Viernes played in the Maharlika Pilipinas Basketball League (MPBL). He played for the Batangas City Athletics at the 2018–19 and the 2019–20 season. During this time, he is already concurrently serving as a coach for the Malaysia national team. He was named as part of Team South for the 2020 Lakan All-Star Game. He was instrumental in Team South's 126–122 win over Team North. He forced the game into overtime and scored the last points for the South via free throw which led to him being named as the All-Star Game MVP. On June 3, 2023, Viernes would score 50 points against the Nueva Ecija Rice Vanguards, breaking the single-game scoring record. The record would stay until 2026 when Nic Cabañero scored 53 points for the Biñan Tatak Gel in a game against Pasig City.

== Coaching career ==
Viernes' stint as coach traces back to his playing time with Malaysian club NS Matrix in 2017. NS Matrix tapped his service the following year in the same tournament. He later became the team's skills coach. He started from being part of the coaching staff of Matrix's second team before rising to the first team. He was part of the Matrix squad which won the 2018 MABA/Matrix Agong Cup. Upon recommendation of NS Matrix, Viernes was made an assistant coach for the Malaysia national team under Australian head coach Brian Lester. The team played at the 2019 Southeast Asian Games where it finished sixth.

Viernes would become the head coach of Malaysia. His coaching debut was at the 2022 FilBasket International Championship, an international club tournament where the team played under the name "Harimau Malaysia". The team won all of its six games in that tournament and defeated fellow Malaysian team Kuala Lumpur Aseel to clinch the title.

His first FIBA stint with Malaysia was at the 2025 FIBA Asia Cup pre-qualifiers in November 2022. He resigned in March 2023.

== PBA career statistics ==
Legend
GP	Games played	MPG	Minutes per game
FG%	Field-goal percentage	3P%	3-point field-goal percentage	FT%	Free-throw percentage
RPG	Rebounds per game	APG	Assists per game	SPG	Steals per game
BPG	Blocks per game	PPG	Points per game	**Bold**	Career high

=== Season-by-season averages ===
Year	Team	GP	MPG	FG%	3P%	FT%	RPG	APG	SPG	BPG	PPG
2016–17	Phoenix	**3**	6.2	**.750**	**.500**	**.500**	.0	**1.0**	.0	.0	**2.7**
2017–18	NorthPort	**3**	**11.3**	.200	–	–	**.7**	**1.0**	**.3**	.0	.7
Career		6	8.8	.475	.250	.250	.4	1.0	.2	.0	1.7
