= La Salle Coliseum =

University sports arena in Bacolod, Philippines

USLS Coliseum
- La Salle Coliseum
- The arena façade
- Interactive map of USLS Coliseum
- Location: Bacolod, Negros Occidental, Philippines
- Coordinates: 10°40′43″N 122°57′41″E
- Owner: University of St. La Salle
- Operator: University of St. La Salle
- Capacity: 8,000

Tenants
- Philippine Basketball Association (out-of-town games); Negros Slashers (MBA) (1998–2002); Bacolod City of Smiles (MPBL) (2019–2022); Negros Hacienderos (MPBL) (2023–present)

The La Salle Coliseum (also called the USLS Coliseum) is an indoor sporting arena located inside the campus of the University of St. La Salle in Bacolod, Philippines and hosts sporting and entertainment events in the province.

The Coliseum played host to a number of basketball games, serves as the home arena of the Maharlika Pilipinas Basketball League's Bacolod City of Smiles and Negros Muscovados. The Coliseum hosted the Negros Slashers of the defunct Metropolitan Basketball Association and some of Philippine Basketball Association's out-of-town games.

The USLS Coliseum in 2006

Negros Occidental Private Schools Sports Cultural Educational Association (NOPSSCEA) sports opening ceremony are usually held in the coliseum and was the official venue during the 2005 Southeast Asian Games particularly the Boxing event where 11 countries participated the competition. The coliseum hosted two major karatedo championships, the 1996 Philippine Karatedo Federation National Championship headed by Pocholo Veguillas and Cristina Ramos-Jalasco, former Philippine Olympic Committee chairman and daughter of former president Fidel V. Ramos and the 2007 20th PKF National Open. Both tournaments were held at the USLS Coliseum. The tournaments were contested by hundreds of karatekas all over the country.

Events and tenants
Preceded by first venue	Home of the Bacolod City of Smiles; 2019–2022	Succeeded by N/A
Preceded by first venue	Home of the Negros Muscovados; 2023	Succeeded by last venue
Preceded by City of Passi Arena	Host of the PBA All-Star Game; 2024	Succeeded by Candon City Arena
