= Negros Hacienderos =

Basketball team in the Philippines

- 2026 Negros Hacienderos season
- League: MPBL (2021–2024, 2026–present)
- Founded: 2021; 5 years ago
- History: Negros Muscovados; 2021–2024; Negros Hacienderos; 2026–present
- Arena: La Salle Coliseum
- Location: Bacolod, Negros Occidental
- Team colors
- Head coach: Kim Cinco

The Negros Hacienderos, formerly the Negros Muscovados, are a Philippine professional basketball team based in Bacolod, a highly urbanized city in the province of Negros Occidental. The team competes in the Maharlika Pilipinas Basketball League (MPBL). The team most recently played its home games at La Salle Coliseum, a venue they used to share with the Bacolod Masskara, their Negros Island Region rivals.

The team was established in 2021 and began competing full-time starting with the 2023 MPBL season alongside the Quezon Huskers. The team last competed in the 2024 MPBL season.

== History ==
=== Entering the league ===
The Negros island was first introduced to the MPBL in the 2019–20 season, when the city of Bacolod was awarded one of six expansion teams that season. On February 8, 2021, the Negros Muscovados formally entered the league, becoming the second team to represent the island and the third team from Western Visayas. The team was initially going to make their debut in the 2021 MPBL season before it got postponed to 2022. The Muscovados would instead make their league debut in that year's Invitational tournament. In the Invitational, the team lost all five games of their games in the group stage and didn't advance to the playoffs.

=== Competing full-time ===
Whilst the team did not participate in the 2022 season, the team's first full-time stint with the league would come the following season. The Muscovados were one of two expansion teams that season, the other being the Quezon Huskers. In its first full-time season with the MPBL, Negros finished with a 10–18 record and ranked 11th in the South Division, two games behind the eighth-seeded team and region rivals Iloilo United Royals.

== Team identity ==
The name alludes to the Negros island being a major producer of muscovados.

Prior to its regular season debut in 2023, the team replaced their colors, replacing blue and yellow with green, gold, and black. The color green is meant to represent the land of Negros. The logo includes a masskara, itself a reference to Bacolod's MassKara Festival. There are also six sugar canes and granules to represent Western Visayas, designated as Region VI, which is where Negros Occidental was based in before the re-establishment of the Negros Island Region in 2024.

== Personnel ==
Negros Hacienderos roster
Players

Pos.	No.	Name	Height	Weight	DOB	From
G	2	Flever Dignadice (FF)	6 ft 0 in (1.83 m)		2002-07-08	Adamson
G	3	DJ Howe (FF)	6 ft 3 in (1.91 m)
F	6	Wilson Baltazar	6 ft 3 in (1.91 m)			Lyceum
G	7	Anthony White (FF)	6 ft 3 in (1.91 m)			SBU
G	8	Jan Formento (HG)	5 ft 10 in (1.78 m)
F	10	Paul Razalan (HG)	6 ft 3 in (1.91 m)
F	11	Jebb Bulawan	6 ft 4 in (1.93 m)			Lyceum
F	12	Ramon Tang II	6 ft 8 in (2.03 m)
F	14	Cerwin Laran	6 ft 3 in (1.91 m)			ICC
F	15	Chezter Josef	6 ft 4 in (1.93 m)			San Sebastian
G	16	Reymar Caduyac	6 ft 0 in (1.83 m)			Lyceum
G	19	Jeric Cinco	6 ft 2 in (1.88 m)			Lyceum
G	21	Achie Iñigo	5 ft 9 in (1.75 m)	160 lb (73 kg)	1991–06–28	Far Eastern
G	23	Michael Alvarez	6 ft 3 in (1.91 m)			José Rizal
G	25	Adven Diputado (HG)	5 ft 9 in (1.75 m)			National-U
G	44	Jervin Deduyo	5 ft 11 in (1.80 m)
F	55	Nhomer Gonzales	6 ft 3 in (1.91 m)			Letran
C	71	John Lee Valin	6 ft 6 in (1.98 m)			Arellano
F	77	Rey Bienes	6 ft 3 in (1.91 m)			Far Eastern
G	88	Peter Marc Manalang	5 ft 11 in (1.80 m)			Letran
F	98	Lorenz Viajar	6 ft 5 in (1.96 m)			UE
F	99	Dan Enrile	6 ft 5 in (1.96 m)		1999-01-14	Centro Escolar

Coaches

Head coach

- Kim Cinco

Assistant coach(es)

- Ronnie Dojillo
- Joseph Abaya

Team manager

- Joseph Abaya

Legend

- (HG) Homegrown
- (FF) Filipino-foreigner
- (EA) EASL player
- (RS) Reserve player
- (S) Suspended
- Injured

- Roster – via Genius Sports
Updated as of: June 21, 2026

=== Head coaches ===
Negros Haccienderos head coaches
#	Name	Start	End	Achievements	Ref.
1	Rolando Aledron Jr.	2021	2023	—	
2	Bonnie Garcia	2023	2024	—	
3	Kim Cinco	2026	current	—	

== Notable players ==
=== MPBL All-Star Day ===
All-Star selections

- Renz Palma – 2024

=== PBA players ===
Ex-PBA players

- Renz Palma

== Season-by-season records ==
League champions
Division champions
Qualified for playoffs
Best regular season record

Season	Regular season							Playoffs	
Season	Division	Finish	GP	W	L	PCT	GB	Stage	Results
Negros Muscovados
2023	South	11th	28	10	18	.357	13	Did not qualify	
2024	South	8th	28	12	16	.429	9	Division quarterfinals	lost vs. Quezon, 0–2
Did not participate from 2025
Negros Hacienderos
2026	South	12th	25	2	23	.080	19	Did not qualify	
All-time regular season record			81	24	57	.296		1 playoff appearance	
All-time playoff record			2	0	2	.000		0 finals appearances	
All-time overall record			83	24	59	.289		0 championships	
