= 2023 MPBL season =

5th season of the Maharlika Pilipinas Basketball League

- League: Maharlika Pilipinas Basketball League
- Sport: Basketball
- Duration: Regular season: March 11 – October 3, 2023; Playoffs: October 6 – November 17, 2023; Finals: November 25 – December 2, 2023
- Games: 405 (regular season); 28 (playoffs)
- Teams: 29
- TV partner(s): Cignal TV (One PH, One Sports+, MPTV, Cignal Play, Pilipinas Live)

Regular season
- Top seed: Pampanga Giant Lanterns
- Season MVP: Justine Baltazar (Pampanga)

Playoffs
- North Division champions: Pampanga Giant Lanterns
- North Division runners-up: San Juan Knights
- South Division champions: Bacoor City Strikers
- South Division runners-up: Batangas City Embassy Chill

Finals
- Champions: Pampanga Giant Lanterns
- Runners-up: Bacoor City Strikers
- Finals MVP: Justine Baltazar (Pampanga)

MPBL seasons
- ← 2022 2024 →

The 2023 MPBL season was the fifth season of the Maharlika Pilipinas Basketball League (MPBL) and the second as a professional league. The regular season began on March 11, 2023, with the opening ceremonies at the Quezon Convention Center in Lucena. The 2023 MPBL All-Star Game was held at Bataan People's Center in Balanga, Bataan on September 16. The league took two breaks during the regular season, during Holy Week and during the Philippines' co-hosting of the 2023 FIBA Basketball World Cup. The playoffs then began on October 6 and ended on December 2 when the Pampanga Giant Lanterns defeated the Bacoor City Strikers in three games in the 2023 MPBL finals.

This season featured 29 teams, which included two expansion teams: the Negros Muscovados and the Quezon Huskers.

OKBet continued to be the league's title sponsor throughout the regular season.

== Teams ==
=== Expansion ===
This season featured two new expansion teams. After competing in the 2021 Invitational, the Negros Muscovados marked their full-time arrival this season. The Quezon Huskers also made their league debut, giving every province in the Calabarzon region at least one team. Five teams also made their return to the league, which includes the Bicol Volcanoes, Bulacan Kuyas, Iloilo United Royals, Parañaque Patriots and Pasay Voyagers. This increased the total number of teams from 22 to 29.

Every returning team is allocated to its previous division, with both Negros and Quezon being placed in the South Division. The Rizal Golden Coolers were realigned back to the North Division.

=== Arenas ===
Expansion team
Returning team
Team switched divisions
New arena

North Division
Team	Arena	Capacity
Bataan Risers	Bataan People's Center	4,000
Bulacan Kuyas	Baliwag Star Arena	5,000
Caloocan Batang Kankaloo	Caloocan Sports Complex	3,000
Makati OKBet Kings	No home games	
Manila Stars	San Andres Sports Complex	3,000
Marikina Shoemasters	Marikina Sports Center	7,000
Nueva Ecija Rice Vanguards	Nueva Ecija Coliseum	3,000
Pampanga Giant Lanterns	Bren Z. Guiao Convention Center	3,000
Parañaque Patriots	Olivarez College Gymnasium	3,500
Pasay Voyagers	Cuneta Astrodome	12,000
Pasig City MCW Sports	Ynares Sports Arena	3,000
Quezon City Toda Aksyon	No home games	
Rizal Golden Coolers	Ynares Center	7,400
Rizal Golden Coolers	One Arena	N/A
San Juan Knights	Filoil EcoOil Centre	6,000
Valenzuela XUR Homes Realty Inc.	WES Arena	N/A

South Division
Team	Arena	Capacity
Bacolod City of Smiles	No home games	
Bacoor City Strikers	Strike Gymansium	1,500
Batangas City Embassy Chill	Batangas City Sports Coliseum	2,500
Batangas City Embassy Chill	Batangas State University Gymnasium	4,000
Bicol Volcanoes	No home games	
GenSan Warriors	Lagao Gymnasium^{[I]}	6,000
Iloilo United Royals	Passi City Arena	2,000
Imus SV Squad	Imus City Sports Complex	1,000
Laguna Heroes	Santa Rosa Sports Complex	5,700
Laguna Heroes	Laguna Sports Complex	2,500
Mindoro Disiplinados	Sentrong Pangkabataan	N/A
Muntinlupa Cagers	Muntinlupa Sports Center	3,000
Negros Muscovados	La Salle Coliseum	8,000
Quezon Huskers	Quezon Convention Center	8,000
Sarangani Marlins	No home games	
Zamboanga Family's Brand Sardines	Mayor Vitaliano D. Agan Coliseum	12,000

Neutral
Event	Arena	Capacity
–	Paco Arena^{[N]}	1,000

Notes

- ^{I} Only used for the 2023 Preseason Invitational.
- ^{N} Despite the presence of the Manila Stars, the arena was not used by the team during the season.

=== Name changes ===
- The Batangas City Embassy Chill temporarily changed its name to Batangas City Tanduay Rum Masters during the 2023 Preseason Invitational.
- The Imus City Bandera changed its name to Imus SV Squad before the 2023 Preseason Invitational.
- The Bacolod Bingo Plus changed its name to Bacolod City of Smiles before the start of the season. The team is alternatively known as the Bacolod Maskaras.
- The Caloocan Excellence changed its name to Caloocan Batang Kankaloo before the start of the season.
- The Laguna Heroes Krah Asia changed its name to Laguna Krah Asia before the start of the season.
- The Makati × MNL Kingpin changed its name to Makati OKBet Kings before the start of the season.
- The Mindoro Tams changed its name to Oriental Mindoro Disiplinados before the start of the season, then later changed to Mindoro Disiplinados in June 2023.
- The Quezon City MG changed its name to Quezon City Gaz N Go before the start of the season, then later changed to Quezon City Toda Aksyon in June 2023.

=== Coaching changes ===
Off-season
Team	Outgoing coach	Incoming coach
Bacolod City of Smiles	Alexander Angeles	Monel Kallos
Bulacan Kuyas	Kerwin McCoy	Alvin Grey
Bacoor City Strikers	Willie Generalao	Alexander Angeles
Bicol Volcanoes	Monel Kallos	Vis Valencia
GenSan Warriors	Marlon Martin	Jesus Ramon Pido
Imus SV Squad	Renniel Cabrera	Jinino Manansala
Iloilo United Royals	Eric Gonzales	Manu Inigo
Makati OKBet Kings	Vis Valencia	Don Dulay
Manila Stars	Maximino Dayandante Jr.	Tylon Darjuan
Muntinlupa Cagers	Vincent Salvador	Jack Azcueta
Pasig City MCW Sports	Ogie Gumatay	Boyet Fernandez
Quezon City Toda Aksyon	Alvin Grey	Teng Torcuator
Valenzuela XUR Homes Realty Inc.	Lester Alvarez	Jhon Velasquez
Mid-season
Bacolod City of Smiles	Monel Kallos	Vincent Salvador
Bataan Risers	Ricky Dandan	Alex Callueng
Bicol Volcanoes	Vis Valencia	Jason Santiago
Bulacan Kuyas	Alvin Grey; Jerry Codinera	Jerry Codinera; Joseph Mabagos
Caloocan Batang Kankaloo	Ronnie Dojillo	Robert Sison
GenSan Warriors	Jesus Ramon Pido	Rich Alvarez
Iloilo United Royals	Manu Inigo	MC Abolucion
Manila Stars	Tylon Darjuan; Bam Ledesma	Bam Ledesma; Bimbot Anquilo
Muntinlupa Cagers	Jack Azcueta	Aldrin Morante
Negros Pau Muscovados	Rolando Aledron Jr.	Bonnie Garcia
Quezon City Toda Aksyon	Teng Torcuator; Weng Adina	Weng Adina; Egay Macaraya
San Juan Knights	Randy Alcantara	Jinggoy Estrada
Valenzuela XUR Homes Realty Inc.	Jhon Velasquez	Eric Martinez
Zamboanga Family's Brand Sardines	Vic Ycasiano	Louie Alas

== Pre-season ==
This season was preceded by the 2023 MPBL Preseason Invitational, which used a similar format to the 2021 Invitational, but downsized because of the smaller eight-team pool. The tournament ran for one week from February 21–27, 2023 at the Lagao Gymnasium in General Santos, the home arena of the GenSan Warriors.

The tournament was won by the Zamboanga Family's Brand Sardines after beating the Nueva Ecija Rice Vanguards in the final game with a score of 88–80, with Dexter Maiquez winning MVP honors.

== Regular season ==
=== Opening ceremony ===
The opening ceremony was held on March 11, 2023, at Quezon Convention Center in Lucena, Quezon. Rapper Andrew E. and singer Marcelito Pomoy were both among the performers to kick off the regular season. Like previous seasons, a muse contest followed wherein some teams took part in.

The first game was between the Rizal Golden Coolers and the Bataan Risers, while the first home game featured the two expansion teams this season, with the Quezon Huskers hosting the Negros Muscovados.

=== Format ===
The 29 teams play in a single round-robin format, playing one game against all other teams in the league for a total of 28 games. In each gameday, a series of games is played in a designated home arena, with the home team usually playing in the final game.

The top eight teams in each division will advance to a four-round, single-elimination playoffs, playing in best-of-three series in the first three rounds, and a best-of-five series in the National Finals, with homecourt advantage alternating between the higher seeds of each series in the first two rounds.

=== Postponed and cancelled games ===
- The Bacoor City–Bataan and Quezon–Marikina games, originally scheduled for September 22, 2023 at Marikina Sports Center, were postponed due to health concerns brought by volcanic smog. Both were then postponed to October 3, 2023, while the venue remained unchanged.
  - The Laguna–Manila game, also originally scheduled for September 22, 2023, was later cancelled due to it having no effect on playoff standings.

=== Standings ===
North Division

Pos	Team	Pld	W	L	GB
1	Pampanga Giant Lanterns	28	26	2	—
2	Nueva Ecija Rice Vanguards	28	23	5	3
3	Makati OKBet Kings	28	21	7	5
4	Caloocan Batang Kankaloo	28	20	8	6
5	Pasig City MCW Sports	28	19 (Note: Pasig wins tiebreaker over San Juan based on head-to-head victory.)	9	7
6	San Juan Knights	28	19	9	7
7	Pasay Voyagers	28	17	11	9
8	Marikina Shoemasters	28	16	12	10
9	Bataan Risers	28	13	15	13
10	Rizal Golden Coolers	28	12	16	14
11	Parañaque Patriots	28	11	17	15
12	Bulacan Kuyas	28	7	21	19
13	Manila Stars	27	4	23	21.5
14	Quezon City Toda Aksyon	28	3 (Note: Quezon City wins tiebreaker over Valenzuela based on head-to-head victory.)	25	23
15	Valenzuela XUR Homes Realty Inc.	28	3	25	23

Source: Standings
Rules for classification: 1) Wins; 2a) If two teams are tied, head-to-head match-up; 2b) If three or more teams are tied, head-to-head point quotient; 3) overall point quotient; 4) coin toss.
Notes:

South Division

Pos	Team	Pld	W	L	GB
1	Bacoor City Strikers	28	23	5	—
2	Batangas City Embassy Chill	28	22	6	1
3	GenSan Warriors	28	21	7	2
4	Zamboanga Family's Brand Sardines	28	20	8	3
5	Quezon Huskers	28	19	9	4
6	Muntinlupa Cagers	28	16	12	7
7	Imus SV Squad	28	15	13	8
8	Iloilo United Royals	28	12	16	11
9	Bacolod City of Smiles	28	11 (Note: Bacolod wins tiebreaker over Sarangani based on head-to-head victory.)	17	12
10	Sarangani Marlins	28	11	17	12
11	Negros Muscovados	28	10	18	13
12	Mindoro Disiplinados	28	6	22	17
13	Laguna Krah Asia	27	4	23	18.5
14	Bicol Volcanoes	28	1	27	22

Source: Standings
Rules for classification: 1) Wins; 2a) If two teams are tied, head-to-head match-up; 2b) If three or more teams are tied, head-to-head point quotient; 3) overall point quotient; 4) coin toss.

=== Results ===
Each team plays every team once. Number of asterisks after each score denotes number of overtimes played.

Teams	BCD	BCR	BAN	BTG	BCL	BUL	CAL	GS	ILO	IMS	LAG	MKT	MNL	MAR	MDR	MUN	NEG	NE	PAM	PAR	PSY	PSG	QZN	QC	RZL	SJ	SAR	VAL	ZAM
Bacolod		86–91	73–69	74–105	93–82	85–84	62–67	80–87	73–80	68–74	84–66	58–63	90–86	67–79	69–60	73–72	88–102	72–90	86–103	77–71	63–67	55–61	56–63	91–75	63–72	69–80	95–91	102–98	77–89
Bacoor City			93–65	71–64	113–75	78–69	75–84**	74–68	74–69*	60–52	75–65	81–77	76–62	75–55	95–76	74–73	88–72	75–83	70–78	83–58	79–65	72–79	75–43	93–58	86–69	73–49	85–70	76–68	81–92
Bataan				60–72	101–58	65–73	71–77	65–99	89–77	68–75	20–0 (Note: The Bataan–Laguna game was forfeited due to Laguna's late arrival. As per FIBA rules, Bataan won the game and was awarded a score of 20–0.)	68–65	60–62	76–73	72–66	85–90	67–64	69–72	72–74	92–56	76–77	67–70	64–61	80–68	70–61	84–86	95–77	80–76	55–74
Batangas City					114–66	76–60	80–67	75–58	78–55	70–71	97–62	80–82	94–79	82–56	98–70	90–84*	83–62	56–68	95–92	92–58	69–54	80–73	84–80*	111–63	78–70	76–91	63–56	104–55	74–81
Bicol						107–115	81–109	80–121	77–109	66–107	80–89	56–73	104–113	59–100	96–93	58–84	76–121	86–129	87–132	55–75	68–75	75–115	74–96	81–85	78–82	63–82	65–73	78–82	64–93
Bulacan							58–70	69–87	85–76	66–125	105–114	76–72	68–72	73–118	73–86	61–78	64–66	67–76	88–121	56–69	56–84	79–110	60–73	100–84	70–87	68–108	75–73	75–71	90–111
Caloocan								90–95	91–87*	80–71	101–81	76–72	79–75	67–75	99–74	81–80	84–82	60–67	68–76	86–80	79–62	74–82	64–67	81–49	108–82	68–76	138–59	83–72	93–74
General Santos									86–84	68–64	89–77	72–79	82–70	85–80	87–78	60–67	88–74	93–97	81–83*	89–82	89–55	91–76	89–71	118–77	80–78	83–88	114–92	109–86	74–71
Iloilo										58–61	57–55	80–87	70–66	71–83	86–79	80–72	78–82	74–80	66–93	79–92	84–85	63–75	73–64	77–51	78–75	73–75	100–98	82–79	86–80
Imus											64–48	83–84*	72–66	103–89	96–74	90–80	88–83*	63–84	72–93	81–86	68–74	60–79	75–77	79–58	65–71	82–93	90–87	80–66	54–71
Laguna												67–72	— (Note: The Laguna–Manila game, originally scheduled for September 22, 2023, was going to be postponed due to health concerns brought by volcanic smog. It was later cancelled due to it having no effect on playoff standings.)	87–94	74–78	62–70	72–76*	70–97	85–109	74–68	78–88	72–84	76–101	102–94	71–75	63–110	85–101	69–73	62–92
Makati													86–64	73–71	77–60	66–67	75–86	68–61	102–97*	76–65	76–61	75–70	72–80	92–70	81–73	95–84	113–88	86–60	95–75
Manila														77–79	78–80	74–85	60–69	98–107	63–91	72–74	70–77	77–89	62–73	90–100*	94–98	85–109	64–81	93–83	80–105
Marikina															96–90	75–79*	69–58	86–88*	75–83	95–89	72–75*	66–71	73–70	89–50	90–70	75–73	103–105*	81–68	74–71
Mindoro																75–84	77–92	69–84	70–91	80–84	86–89*	79–88	80–85	79–77	68–75	100–116	107–97	110–93	83–102
Muntinlupa																	77–71	67–71	73–87	73–63	71–72	87–84*	78–85	76–43	64–69	91–90	105–104*	89–79	67–89
Negros																		72–94	66–79	74–78	73–79	76–85	80–82	77–61	69–78	66–73	103–109*	94–75	71–72
Nueva Ecija																			64–76	91–74	88–79	69–65	86–87*	95–53	87–70	99–97*	123–134**	107–78	65–67
Pampanga																				88–82	108–89	81–66	83–60	115–79	93–80	89–73	99–92	79–55	77–71
Parañaque																					79–98	58–96	61–75	87–73	79–80	82–88	77–75	84–75	86–77*
Pasay																						64–77	49–64	72–64	65–59	75–74	69–84	89–60	66–77
Pasig City																							58–74	96–72	82–64	90–75	65–82	85–62	93–95*
Quezon																								81–63	74–73	69–98	87–92*	89–77	70–66
Quezon City																									66–102	77–113	68–94	88–79	66–99
Rizal																										65–79	77–71	80–85	57–74
San Juan																											103–87	115–86	66–80
Sarangani																												107–98	63–83
Valenzuela																													54–98
Zamboanga																													

Source: Standings
Legend: Blue = left column team win; Red = top row team win.
Matches with lighter background shading were decided after overtime.

== Playoffs ==
The 2023 MPBL playoffs began on October 6, 2023.

=== Bracket ===
Teams in bold advanced to the next round. The numbers to the left of each team indicate the team's seeding in its division, and the numbers to the right indicate the number of games the team won in that round. Teams with homecourt advantage, the higher-seeded team, are shown in italics.

Division quarterfinals (best-of-3)	Division semifinals (best-of-3)
N1	**Pampanga**	**2**
N8	Marikina	0
N1	**Pampanga**	**2**
N4	Caloocan	0
N4	**Caloocan**	**2**
N5	Pasig City	1
**North Division**
N2	**Nueva Ecija**	**2**
N7	Pasay	0
N2	Nueva Ecija	0
N6	**San Juan**	**2**
N3	Makati	0
N6	**San Juan**	**2**
S1	**Bacoor City**	**2**
S8	Iloilo	1
S1	**Bacoor City**	**2**
S4	Zamboanga	0
S4	**Zamboanga**	**2**
S5	Quezon	1
**South Division**
S2	**Batangas City**	**2**
S7	Imus	0
S2	**Batangas City**	**2**
S3	General Santos	1
S3	**General Santos**	**2**
S6	Muntinlupa	1

Division finals (best-of-3)
N1	**Pampanga**	**2**
N6	San Juan	0
S1	**Bacoor City**	**2**
S2	Batangas City	0

National finals (best-of-5)
N1	**Pampanga**	**3**
S1	Bacoor City	0

=== Division quarterfinals ===
==== North Division ====
Team 1	Series	Team 2	Game 1	Game 2	Game 3
**(1) Pampanga Giant Lanterns**	**2**–0	(8) Marikina Shoemasters	**82**–70	**81**–61	—
**(2) Nueva Ecija Rice Vanguards**	**2**–0	(7) Pasay Voyagers	**85**–81	**71**–62	—
(3) Makati OKBet Kings	0–**2**	**(6) San Juan Knights**	84–**95**	92–**95** (2OT)	—
**(4) Caloocan Batang Kankaloo**	**2**–1	(5) Pasig City MCW Sports	**71**–69	61–**65**	**68**–60

==== South Division ====
Team 1	Series	Team 2	Game 1	Game 2	Game 3
**(1) Bacoor City Strikers**	**2**–1	(8) Iloilo United Royals	86–**89**	**92**–52	**72**–61
**(2) Batangas City Embassy Chill**	**2**–0	(7) Imus SV Squad	**78**–71	**61**–59	—
**(3) GenSan Warriors**	**2**–1	(6) Muntinlupa Cagers	**79**–70	91–**99**	**85**–78
**(4) Zamboanga Family's Brand Sardines**	**2**–1	(5) Quezon Huskers	**77**–68	58–**65**	**88**–76

=== Division semifinals ===
==== North Division ====
Team 1	Series	Team 2	Game 1	Game 2	Game 3
**(1) Pampanga Giant Lanterns**	**2**–0	(4) Caloocan Batang Kankaloo	**74**–63	**93**–77	—
(2) Nueva Ecija Rice Vanguards	0–**2**	**(6) San Juan Knights**	82–**86**	80–**88**	—

==== South Division ====
Team 1	Series	Team 2	Game 1	Game 2	Game 3
**(1) Bacoor City Strikers**	**2**–0	(4) Zamboanga Family's Brand Sardines	**61**–56	**78**–72	—
**(2) Batangas City Embassy Chill**	**2**–1	(3) GenSan Warriors	**81**–75	55–**61**	**66**–62

=== Division finals ===
==== North Division ====
Team 1	Series	Team 2	Game 1	Game 2	Game 3
**(1) Pampanga Giant Lanterns**	**2**–0	(6) San Juan Knights	**86**–82	**82**–76	—

==== South Division ====
Team 1	Series	Team 2	Game 1	Game 2	Game 3
**(1) Bacoor City Strikers**	**2**–0	(2) Batangas City Embassy Chill	**89**–68	**54**–49	—

=== MPBL finals ===
Team 1	Series	Team 2	Game 1	Game 2	Game 3	Game 4	Game 5
**(N1) Pampanga Giant Lanterns**	**3**–0	(S1) Bacoor City Strikers	**71**–58	**68**–65	**82**–77	—	—

== All-Star Game ==
The 2023 MPBL All-Star Game, the league's fourth overall, took place on September 16, 2023, at the Bataan People's Center in Balanga, Bataan, the home arena of the Bataan Risers. The North Division finally won against the South Division after three seasons, with a score of 99–91, with All-Star MVP honors going to Justine Baltazar.

== Records and milestones ==
=== Records ===
- May 30, 2023 – Justine Baltazar of the Pampanga Giant Lanterns broke the single-game rebounding record, with 27 rebounds against the Bataan Risers.
- June 3, 2023:
  - Jeff Viernes of the Sarangani Marlins broke the single-game scoring record, with 50 points against the Nueva Ecija Rice Vanguards, beating the previous record held by John Wilson in 2019.
  - Sarangani won 134–123, putting an end to Nueva Ecija's 32-game regular season winning streak, which began at the start of the 2022 season. The 257 total points scored between the two teams is also the most such in a single game.
- August 2, 2023 – Poypoy Actub of the Imus SV Squad broke the single-game dunking record, with 7 dunks against the Bulacan Kuyas.
- September 30, 2023 – The Pampanga Giant Lanterns tied the record for most wins in a single season, earning its 26th win against the San Juan Knights. The San Juan Knights and Davao Occidental Tigers both had 26 wins in the 2019–20 season.

=== Milestones ===
- March 11, 2023 – James Castro becomes the 14th player to reach 1,000 MPBL career points.
- March 20, 2023 – Chito Jaime becomes the 15th player to reach 1,000 MPBL career points.
- March 25, 2023 – Allan Mangahas becomes the 16th player to reach 1,000 MPBL career points.
- March 27, 2023 – Alwyn Alday becomes the 17th player to reach 1,000 MPBL career points.
- March 30, 2023 – Felix Apreku becomes the 2nd player to reach 1,000 MPBL career rebounds.
- April 14, 2023 - Jay-R Taganas becomes the 3rd player to reach 1,000 MPBL career rebounds.
- May 6, 2023 – Chris Bitoon becomes the 18th player to reach 1,000 MPBL career points.
- May 10, 2023 – Dhon Reverente becomes the 19th player to reach 1,000 MPBL career points.
- May 22, 2023 – Mark Montuano becomes the 20th player to reach 1,000 MPBL career points.
- June 7, 2023:
  - Paul Sanga becomes the 21st player to reach 1,000 MPBL career points.
  - Reil Cervantes becomes the 22nd player to reach 1,000 MPBL career points.
- June 8, 2023 - James Martinez becomes the 23rd player to reach 1,000 MPBL career points.
- June 21, 2023 - Dhon Reverente becomes the 4th player to reach 1,000 MPBL career rebounds.
  - Dhon Reverente also becomes the second player to reach 1,000 MPBL career points and rebounds.
- July 5, 2023 – Jeff Viernes becomes the 24th player to reach 1,000 MPBL career points.
- August 14, 2023 – Robin Roño becomes the 25th player to reach 1,000 MPBL career points.
- September 18, 2023 – Paolo Hubalde becomes the 26th player to reach 1,000 MPBL career points.
- October 24, 2023 – Dave Moralde becomes the 27th player to reach 1,000 MPBL career points.
- October 28, 2023:
  - Jeckster Apinan becomes the 5th player to reach 1,000 MPBL career rebounds.
    - Jeckster Apinan also becomes the third player to reach 1,000 MPBL career points and rebounds.
  - Jhaymo Eguilos becomes the 28th player to reach 1,000 MPBL career points.

== Statistics ==
=== Individual statistical leaders ===
Category	Player	Team	Statistic
Points per game	Jeff Viernes	Sarangani Marlins	17.7
Rebounds per game	Justine Baltazar	Pampanga Giant Lanterns	16.9
Assists per game	Paulo Hubalde	Mindoro Disiplinados	8.3
Steals per game	Jeckster Apinan	Batangas City Embassy Chill	2.3
Blocks per game	Jason Ballesteros	Pasig City MCW Sports	1.5
Fouls per game	Jamil Gabawan; Ryan Ongteco	Bataan Risers; Iloilo United Royals	3.2
Minutes per game	Justine Baltazar	Pampanga Giant Lanterns	31.3
FG%	Justine Baltazar	Pampanga Giant Lanterns	54.4%
FT%	Rafael Are	Sarangani Marlins	83.1%
3FG%	Rodel Vaygan	Mindoro Disiplinados	43.7%

=== Team statistical leaders ===
Category	Team	Statistic
Points per game	Pampanga Giant Lanterns	88.9
Rebounds per game	Pampanga Giant Lanterns	55.8
Assists per game	Nueva Ecija Rice Vanguards	25.7
Steals per game	Nueva Ecija Rice Vanguards	10.4
Blocks per game	Marikina Shoemasters	3.9
Turnovers per game	Bicol Volcanoes	17.8

== Awards ==
=== Individual season awards ===
Most of the league's individual awards were given out on November 28, 2023, before game 2 of the National Finals series at the Bren Z. Guiao Convention Center in San Fernando, Pampanga. The Finals Most Valuable Player and Coach of the Year were awarded at the conclusion of the national finals on December 2, 2023, at Strike Gymnasium in Bacoor, Cavite.

Two new awards were introduced this season, those being the Most Improved Player and the Impact Player of the Year.

Award	Recipient	Team
Most Valuable Player	Justine Baltazar	Pampanga Giant Lanterns
Finals Most Valuable Player	Justine Baltazar	Pampanga Giant Lanterns
Defensive Player of the Year	Jason Ballesteros	Pasig City MCW Sports
Rookie of the Year	Adrian Nocum	San Juan Knights
Homegrown Player of the Year	Cris Masaglang	GenSan Warriors
Most Improved Player	Jhan Nermal	Bacoor City Strikers
Impact Player of the Year	Poypoy Actub	Imus SV Squad
Coach of the Year	Dennis Pineda	Pampanga Giant Lanterns
Executive of the Year	Manuel Carlos Ilagan Jr.	Bataan Risers
Sportsmanship award	Jay-R Taganas	Nueva Ecija Rice Vanguards

=== All-MPBL teams ===
All-MPBL First Team
Player	Team
Justine Baltazar	Pampanga Giant Lanterns
Jaycee Marcelino	Zamboanga Family's Brand Sardines
Will McAloney	Nueva Ecija Rice Vanguards
Jhan Nermal	Bacoor City Strikers
Orlan Wamar Jr.	San Juan Knights

All-MPBL Second Team
Player	Team
Jeckster Apinan	Batangas City Embassy Chill
Robby Celiz	Makati OKBet Kings
Archie Concepcion	Pampanga Giant Lanterns
Ryan Costelo	Pasig City MCW Sports
James Kwekuteye	Bacoor City Strikers

=== Players of the Week ===
This is the first season in which the league awarded the Player of the Week award during the playoffs, during which it is called the Playoffs Performer of the Week. It is only given out during the first two rounds of the playoffs.

Week	Player	Ref.
Regular season
March 11–18, 2023	Jerick Nacpil (Bulacan Kuyas)	
March 20–26, 2023	Jimboy Estrada (Imus SV Squad)	
March 27 – April 1, 2023	Shane Menina (Pasig City MCW Sports)	
April 3–4, 2023	Not awarded	
April 13–15, 2023	Troy Mallillin (Rizal Golden Coolers)	
April 17–22, 2023	Laurenz Victoria (Pasay Voyagers)	
April 24–29, 2023	Agem Miranda (Oriental Mindoro Disiplinados)	
May 1–6, 2023	Justine Baltazar (Pampanga Giant Lanterns) (1/6)	
May 8–13, 2023	Justine Baltazar (Pampanga Giant Lanterns) (2/6)	
May 15–20, 2023	Justine Baltazar (Pampanga Giant Lanterns) (3/6)	
May 22–27, 2023	Jhan Nermal (Bacoor City Strikers) (1/2)	
May 29 – June 3, 2023	Jeff Viernes (Sarangani Marlins)	
June 5–10, 2023	Justine Baltazar (Pampanga Giant Lanterns) (4/6)	
June 12–17, 2023	Jhan Nermal (Bacoor City Strikers) (2/2)	
June 19–24, 2023	Jaymar Gimpayan (Imus SV Squad)	
June 26 – July 1, 2023	Justine Baltazar (Pampanga Giant Lanterns) (5/6)	
July 3–8, 2023	Ryan Costelo (Pasig City MCW Sports)	
July 10–15, 2023	Omar Larupay (Iloilo United Royals)	
July 17–22, 2023	Justine Baltazar (Pampanga Giant Lanterns) (6/6)	
July 24–29, 2023	Mark Sarangay (Bacolod Maskaras)	
July 31 – August 5, 2023	Keith Agovida (Makati OKBet Kings)	
August 7–12, 2023	Poypoy Actub (Imus SV Squad)	
August 14–19, 2023	Yves Sazon (Bataan Risers)	
August 21–24, 2023	Not awarded	
September 11–14, 2023	Ian Melencio (Muntinlupa Cagers)	
September 18–23, 2023	Rodel Gravera (Quezon Huskers)	
September 25–30, 2023	Not awarded	
Playoffs
October 6–7, 2023	Gabby Espinas (Caloocan Batang Kankaloo)	
October 9–14, 2023	Robbie Manalang (Pasig City MCW Sports)	
October 16–21, 2023	Ian Melencio (Muntinlupa Cagers)	
October 24–28, 2023	Orlan Wamar Jr. (San Juan Knights)	
November 3–4, 2023	Michael Calisaan (San Juan Knights)	

== Notable events ==
- August 8, 2023 – The Bataan–Laguna game was forfeited in Bataan's favor, marking the first time in league history that a game was forfeited in its entirety. (The Basilan–Davao Occidental playoff game in 2021 was classified as "defaulted".)
- September 17, 2023 – Over 30 MPBL players were drafted during the PBA season 48 draft, a big increase from the seven drafted in Season 47. Nueva Ecija's Kemark Cariño was the first MPBL player and first local player drafted, picked 13th overall by the Terrafirma Dyip during the second round.

== Junior MPBL tournaments ==
The league's youth-oriented counterpart, the Junior MPBL, began its inaugural 2023 season on July 9, 2023, at the Filoil EcoOil Centre in San Juan. The following tournaments took place during the 2023 professional season.

Age Group	Division	Champion	Series	Runner-up
14-Under	North	Mindoro Junior Disiplinados	2–1	Quezon City 828 Junior Giants
14-Under	South	Cavite City Aces Solar	2–1	Leyte XUR Homes
14-Under	Overall	Cavite City Aces Solar	2–0	Mindoro Junior Disiplinados
16-Under	North	Quezon City 828 Junior Giants	2–1	Pampanga Giant Lanterns
16-Under	South	Davao Red Cubs	2–1	Bauan Cafe Uno
16-Under	Overall	Davao Red Cubs	2–0	Quezon City 828 Junior Giants
18-Under	North	Mandaluyong Junior Microsmith	2–1	Rizal Switch Fiber
18-Under	South	Davao Red Cubs	2–0	Bauan Cafe Uno
18-Under	Overall	Mandaluyong Junior Microsmith	2–1	Davao Red Cubs

== Media ==
This season marked the second year of Cignal TV's ongoing television broadcast rights with the league. Carrying over from the previous season, games were also broadcast on One PH and One Sports+, the latter was only used for the Invitational tournament. Since April 13, Media Pilipinas TV (MPTV) began broadcasting all games.

This season saw an expansion of the league's streaming portfolio. Cignal's Pilipinas Live began streaming games in June 2023, while Bola.TV began in August 2023. The league continued to broadcast its games on Facebook, YouTube, and Cignal Play.
