= Jeckster Apinan =

Filipino basketball player

No. 43 – Batangas City Athletics
- Position: Small forward
- League: MPBL

Personal information
- Born: January 9, 1987 (age 39) Roxas City, Capiz, Philippines
- Listed height: 6 ft 3 in (1.91 m)
- Listed weight: 190 lb (86 kg)

Career information
- College: JRU (2009–2014)
- PBA draft: 2013: Undrafted
- Playing career: 2014–present

Career history
- 2014–2016: NLEX Road Warriors
- 2016–2017: Kia Picanto
- 2017: Cignal HD Hawkeyes
- 2018–2020: Makati Super Crunch
- 2021: Pasig Sta. Lucia Realtors
- 2022–present: Batangas City Embassy Chill/Tanduay Rum Masters/Athletics

Career highlights
- All-MPBL First Team (2020); All-MPBL Second Team (2023); MPBL All-Star (2023)

Jeckster Apinan is a Filipino professional player for the Batangas City Athletics of the Maharlika Pilipinas Basketball League (MPBL). He was born and raised in Roxas City, Capiz. He played college ball for JRU Heavy Bombers before entering the Philippine Basketball Association (PBA).
