= Batangas City Tanduay Rum Masters =

Professional basketball team in Batangas City, Batangas, Philippines

Batangas City Athletics
- 2026 Batangas City Athletics season
- League: MPBL
- Founded: 2018; 8 years ago
- History: Batangas City Athletics; 2018–2021, 2024, 2026–present Tanduay Rum Masters; 2022; Batangas City Embassy Chill; 2022–2023; Batangas City Tanduay Rum Masters; 2023, 2024–2025
- Arena: Batangas Province Events Center; Batangas City Sports Coliseum; FPJ Arena (San Jose)
- Location: Batangas City, Batangas
- Team colors
- Main sponsor: Tanduay Distillers
- Head coach: Pocholo Villanueva
- Championships: MPBL: 1 (2018)

The Batangas City Athletics (also known as Batangas City Tanduay Athletics for sponsorship reasons) are a professional basketball team based in Batangas City, Batangas. The team competes in the Maharlika Pilipinas Basketball League (MPBL) as a member of the league's South Division. The team splits its home games between Batangas City Sports Coliseum and FPJ Arena in San Jose.

They joined in 2018 as one of the founding teams of the MPBL. The team first went by the Batangas City Athletics, before changing to Batangas City Embassy Chill in 2022. They then renamed to the Tanduay Rum Masters in 2024. They clinched the inaugural championship in 2018. The Rum Masters are based in Calabarzon and since its establishment have been backed by the Tanduay Distillers as part of the company's athletics program. The Batangas City franchise has also played in the FilBasket.

== History ==
=== Tanduay's prior involvement ===
Tanduay's involvement with basketball can be traced back to the Tanduay Rhum Masters that played in the Philippine Basketball Association (PBA) from 1975 to 1987 and again from 1999 to 2001.

=== Maharlika Pilipinas Basketball League ===
In 2018, the Batangas City Athletics were founded as one of the league's ten charter teams. With a record of 8-1, Batangas City captured the league's best record and made it to the 2018 MPBL Rajah Cup finals, where they beat the Muntinlupa Cagers, three games to one, to become the inaugural MPBL champions.

In the 2018–19 season, Batangas City ended the season with a record of 13-10 to claim the second seed in the Southern Division. The team failed to defend their championship, after they lost to the Davao Occidental Tigers in the division finals in three games.

In the 2019–20 season, Batangas City made their third straight playoff appearance with a record of 19-11, but lost to the Zamboanga Family's Brand Sardines in the First Round in three games.

Logo of the Batangas City Embassy Chill used from 2022 until 2023.

Logo of the Batangas City Embassy Chill used from 2022 until 2025.

The team opted out of the 2021 Invitational before returning in 2022, in which the team was renamed to Batangas City Embassy Chill. With a 17-4 record, the team made their fourth straight playoff appearance, once again making a run to the division finals, where they would once again fall to Zamboanga in three games.

For the 2023 Preseason Invitational, the team was temporarily renamed as the Batangas City Tanduay Rum Masters.

For the 2026 season, the team reverted back the name as the Batangas City Athletics.

=== FilBasket ===
As the MPBL postponed its fourth season to 2022, the Tanduay-backed franchise were among the teams that took part in FilBasket. The team first took part in the 2021 Subic Championship. The Athletics finished 8th, but lost to eventual champions AICC Manila.

Right before the 2022 MPBL season, the franchise took part in the succeeding 2022 Summer Championship, marking the franchise's first professional outing. As the Tanduay Rum Masters, the team finished the elimination round 11–0, winning every game. During the playoffs, they first beat Muntinlupa in the quarterfinals but would get swept by the fifth-seeded San Juan Knights in the semifinals.

== Home arenas ==
The franchise has played most of its home slate at Batangas City Sports Coliseum, making it their primary venue. The team also played some games at other venues across the province, including Batangas State University, Batangas Province Events Center,De La Salle Lipa in Lipa, and FPJ Arena in San Jose.

Venue	Location	Capacity	2018	2018–19	2019–20	2022	2023	2024	2025
Batangas City Coliseum	Batangas City, Batangas	4,000	✓	✓	✓	✓	✓	✓	✓
Batangas State University	Batangas City, Batangas	2,500	✗	✓	✓	✗	✓	✗	✗
Batangas Province Events Center	Batangas City, Batangas	6,000	✗	✗	✗	✗	✗	✗	✓
De La Salle Lipa	Lipa, Batangas	1,000	✗	✓	✗	✗	✗	✗	✗
FPJ Arena	San Jose, Batangas	3,000	✗	✗	✗	✗	✗	✓	✓

== Rivalries ==
=== Zamboanga Sikat ===
Zamboanga and Batangas City have faced each other in the playoffs in three consecutive occasions from 2019 to 2022, all of which went the full three games. Batangas City won the series in 2019. As of 2023, the two teams have met a total of thirteen times in the MPBL.

== Current roster ==
Batangas City Athletics roster
Players

Pos.	No.	Name	Height	Weight	DOB	From
G/F	1	Kraniel Villoria	6 ft 1 in (1.85 m)		1995–07–14	Arellano
G	3	Wendel Comboy	6 ft 0 in (1.83 m)	170 lb (77 kg)	1997–07–21	Far Eastern
G	4	Paul Zamar	5 ft 10 in (1.78 m)	179 lb (81 kg)	1987–10–20	UE
F	5	Rhinwil Yambing	6 ft 3 in (1.91 m)		1998–10–19	San Sebastian
G/F	7	Oliver Neal Arim (HG)	6 ft 2 in (1.88 m)		1995–04–19	Centro Escolar
G	8	Arturo Oliva III (HG)	5 ft 10 in (1.78 m)		2000–06–01	Arellano
F	9	Nikki Perez (HG)	6 ft 3 in (1.91 m)		1999–01–11	UB
G	10	Carlos Isit Jr.	5 ft 9 in (1.75 m)		1991–02–21	Mapúa
F	11	Mark Anthony Olayon	6 ft 2 in (1.88 m)	188 lb (85 kg)	1994–10–30	UE
F	12	Darwin Lunor	6 ft 3 in (1.91 m)		1990–10–08	St. Clare of Caloocan
F	15	Dawn Ochea	6 ft 3 in (1.91 m)	175 lb (79 kg)	1996–07–04	Adamson
C	17	Abdul Sawat	6 ft 6 in (1.98 m)		1998–06–13	UE
C	24	Mark Neil Cruz	6 ft 5 in (1.96 m)		1995–03–01	José Rizal
C	26	John Ambulodto	6 ft 5 in (1.96 m)	195 lb (88 kg)	1990–09–25	St. Clare
G	27	King Importante	6 ft 2 in (1.88 m)		1988–01–27	Adamson
F	29	Jhan Nermal	6 ft 3 in (1.91 m)	172 lb (78 kg)	1993–05–19	STI WNU
G	30	Aljay Sigarra (HG)	5 ft 8 in (1.73 m)		2003–10–04	CLB
F	42	John Grospe	6 ft 4 in (1.93 m)		1994–05–02	José Rizal
F	43	Jeckster Apinan	6 ft 3 in (1.91 m)	190 lb (86 kg)	1987–01–09	José Rizal
F	53	Cedric Ablaza	6 ft 3 in (1.91 m)		1991–05–19	STI
G	—	VJ Alarcon (HG)	6 ft 0 in (1.83 m)		1998–12–07	OLFU

Coaches

Head coach

- Pocholo Villanueva

Assistant coach(es)

- Jay-R Aquino
- Warren Capitan
- John Mark Arenas
- Jimwell Gican

Team manager

- Jean Michael Alabanza
- Gullbert Alea

Legend

- (HG) Homegrown
- (FF) Filipino-foreigner
- (EA) EASL player
- (RS) Reserve player
- (S) Suspended
- Injured

- Roster – via Genius Sports
Updated as of: June 22, 2026

=== Head coaches ===
Batangas City Athletics head coaches
#	Name	Start	End	Achievements	Ref.
1	Mac Tan	2018	2019	—	
2	Goldwin Monteverde	2019	2019	—	
3	Woody Co	2019	2019–20	—	
4	Pocholo Villanueva	2022	current	—	

== Notable players ==
=== Individual award winners ===
Finals Most Valuable Player

- Val Acuña – 2018

All-MPBL First Team

- Cedric Albaza – 2022

All-MPBL Second Team

- Jeckster Apinan – 2023

=== MPBL All-Star Day ===
All-Star selections

- Jhaymo Eguilos – 2019
- Jeff Viernes – 2019, 2020
- Cedric Ablaza – 2022, 2024
- Jeckster Apinan – 2023
- Mark Niel Cruz – 2023
- Levi Hernandez – 2024

All-Star Game head coaches

- Pocholo Villanueva – 2022

=== PBA players ===
Ex-PBA players

- Val Acuña
- Lester Alvarez
- Jeckster Apinan
- Juneric Baloria
- Bong Galanza
- Rudy Lingganay
- Philip Paniamogan
- Kris Porter
- Teytey Teodoro
- Jeff Viernes
- Dennice Villamor

Drafted to PBA

- Paul Varilla – 13th overall, 2018
- Bong Quinto – 14th overall, 2018
- Teytey Teodoro – 23rd overall, 2018
- Arvin Tolentino – 10th overall, 2019
- Simon Camacho – 34th overall, 2019

=== Other notable players ===
- Derek Ramsay

== Season-by-season records ==
League champions
Division champions
Qualified for playoffs
Best regular season record

=== Maharlika Pilipinas Basketball League ===
Season	Regular season							Playoffs	
Season	Division	Finish	GP	W	L	PCT	GB	Stage	Results
Batangas City Athletics
2018; Rajah Cup	—	1st	9	8	1	.889	—	Quarterfinals; Semifinals; Finals	won vs. Bataan, 2–0 won vs. Valenzuela, 2–0 won vs. Muntinlupa, 3–1
2018–19; Datu Cup	South	2nd	25	15	10	.600	5	Division quarterfinals Division semifinals Division finals	won vs. Imus, 2–1 won vs. Zamboanga, 2–1 lost vs. Davao Occidental, 1–2
2019–20; Lakan Season	South	4th	30	19	11	.633	7	Division quarterfinals	lost vs. Zamboanga, 1–2
Batangas City Embassy Chill
2022	South	2nd	21	17	4	.810	1	Division quarterfinals Division semifinals Division finals	won vs. Bacoor City, 2–1 won vs. Rizal, 2–0 lost vs. Zamboanga, 1–2
2023	South	2nd	28	22	6	.786	1	Division quarterfinals Division semifinals Division finals	won vs. Imus, 2–0 won vs. General Santos, 2–1 lost vs. Bacoor City, 0–2
Batangas City Tanduay Rum Masters
2024	South	2nd	28	20	8	.714	1	Division quarterfinals Division semifinals Division finals	won vs. Davao Occidental, 2–0 won vs. South Cotabato, 2–1 lost vs. Quezon, 1–2
2025	South	2nd	29	20	9	.690	5	Division quarterfinals Division semifinals	won vs. Zamboanga, 2–1 lost vs. Biñan, 1–2
Batangas City Athletics
2026	South	4th	25	19	6	.760	2	Division quarterfinals	lost vs. Cebu, 0–2
All-time regular season record			195	140	55	.718		8 playoff appearances	
All-time playoff record			51	30	21	.588		1 finals appearance	
All-time overall record			246	170	76	.691		1 championship	

== See also ==
- Tanduay Rhum Masters
- Tanduay Light Rhum Masters
