= GenSan Warriors =

Professional basketball team in General Santos, Philippines

- 2026 GenSan Warriors season
- League: MVBA (2005–2008); NBC (2007–2008); Liga Pilipinas (2008–2011); MPBL (2018–present); PSL (2024–2025)
- Founded: 2005; 21 years ago (first incarnation); 2018; 8 years ago (second incarnation)
- History: GenSan MP PacMan Warriors; 2005–2008; MP–GenSan Warriors; 2008–2011; GenSan Warriors; 2018–2023, 2024–present South Cotabato Warriors; 2024
- Arena: Polomolok Gymnasium; Lagao Gymnasium (last used in 2023)
- Location: General Santos
- Team colors
- Head coach: Elvis Tolentino

The GenSan Warriors are a Filipino professional basketball team based in General Santos. The team competes in the Maharlika Pilipinas Basketball League (MPBL) as a member of the league's South Division. The team most recently played their home games at Polomolok Gymnasium.

The team's first incarnation began play in the Mindanao Visayas Basketball Association (MVBA) as the GenSan MP PacMan Warriors from 2005 to 2008 while also playing in the National Basketball Conference (NBC) from 2007 to 2008. The team played in Liga Pilipinas from 2008 to 2011 as the MP–GenSan Warriors following the merger of the two former leagues.

In 2018, the team was revived as part of the MPBL's national expansion during the 2018–19 season. The team name was simplified as the GenSan Warriors, keeping the location identifier and moniker. In 2024, the team name was changed to South Cotabato Warriors, representing the entire province, before going back to their previous moniker when they joined the Pilipinas Super League (PSL) in late 2024.

The Warriors are one of five teams based in Mindanao and one of two based in the Soccsksargen region, the other team being the Sarangani Marlins.

== History ==
=== First incarnation (2005–2011) ===
The team was founded in 2005 as the GenSan MP PacMan Warriors, originally as part of the Mindanao Visayas Basketball Association (MVBA) and later the National Basketball Conference (NBC) in 2007. General Santos then became part of Liga Pilipinas in 2008 following the merger of both leagues and renamed to the MP–GenSan Warriors. Liga Pilipinas ceased operations in 2011, ending the team's first incarnation.

=== Second incarnation (2018–present) ===
The team was revived in 2018 as part of the Maharlika Pilipinas Basketball League's national expansion in the 2018–19 season, becoming the league's first representative from the Soccsksargen region. Led by homegrown player Cris Masaglang, the team finished 4th in the South Division with 14–11 record. In the playoffs, the Warriors would be swept by the fifth-seeded Bacoor City Strikers in the First Round. General Santos then added Robby Celiz and John Raymundo into the roster for the 2019–20 MPBL season. Despite those additions and improving to 18–12, GenSan only finished seventh. Once again, the team was swept by second-seeded Bacoor City.

Both Celiz and Raymundo would depart from the team before the 2022 season, while also adding Nikko Panganiban. Panganiban would be declared an all-star as the Warriors once again improved, going 15–6 and finishing 4th in the South. The team would unfortunately suffer its third straight first-round exit after losing in three games to the Mark Yee-led Bacolod Bingo Plus. Panganiban would leave for San Juan, while the team added 2020 MVP John Wilson from the Pilipinas Super League's Davao Occidental Tigers. Alongside Wilson is Kyt Jimenez, coming off his rookie season with region rivals Sarangani. The 2023 season would be the team's most successful as it stands, finishing 21–7, improving their record yet again and breaking into the top three in its division for the first time. Wilson and Jimenez were both declared all-stars while Masaglang would win the Homegrown Player of the Year award. That season also saw the team's first-ever playoff series win, beating the Muntinlupa Cagers in three games in the First Round before losing to the Batangas City Embassy Chill in three during the Division Semifinals.

Heading into the 2024 season, the team will be without Jimenez, who was drafted and signed by the San Miguel Beermen in the PBA season 48 draft. The Warriors also changed its location identifier to South Cotabato to represent the entire region.

== Current roster ==
GenSan Warriors roster
Players

Pos.	No.	Name	Height	Weight	DOB	From
G	0	Ashon Andrews (FF)	6 ft 4 in (1.93 m)			UST
F	5	Larry Rodriguez	6 ft 5 in (1.96 m)	210 lb (95 kg)	1983–05–05	PMI
G	6	Eloie Tan	5 ft 11 in (1.80 m)		1999–06–08	PLMar
F	7	Kyle Dominic Tolentino	6 ft 4 in (1.93 m)		2001–09–25	Letran
G	8	Christopher Masaglang (HG)	5 ft 8 in (1.73 m)		1990–09–08	Holy Trinity
G	9	Mark Cruz	5 ft 6 in (1.68 m)	150 lb (68 kg)	1992–07–27	Letran
F	10	RJ Minerva	6 ft 5 in (1.96 m)		1999–07–10	National-U
F	12	Marwin Dionisio	6 ft 3 in (1.91 m)		1999–11–13	José Rizal
C	14	Kris Porter	6 ft 5 in (1.96 m)	195 lb (88 kg)	1994–09–02	Ateneo
F	16	Adrian Santos	6 ft 3 in (1.91 m)	200 lb (91 kg)	1992–04–18	UE
G/F	21	Val Acuña	6 ft 3 in (1.91 m)	180 lb (82 kg)	1986–08–08	UE
F	22	Anton Eusebio (FF)	6 ft 5 in (1.96 m)		2000–10–11	St. Benilde
F	23	JM Versoza	6 ft 3 in (1.91 m)		2000–02–04	Lyceum
G	24	Joshua Fontanilla	5 ft 10 in (1.78 m)			UST
C	25	Ryan Jay Arenal	6 ft 5 in (1.96 m)		2000–02–10	José Rizal
F	30	Nelo Santos	6 ft 2 in (1.88 m)			UMak
G	35	Hesed Gabo	5 ft 9 in (1.75 m)		1992-03-21	Mapúa
F	41	CJ Gonzales (HG)	6 ft 4 in (1.93 m)			José Rizal
G	66	Ashven Glodove Ortega (HG)	6 ft 8 in (2.03 m)			Holy Trinity
F/C	67	Rene Pacquiao	6 ft 5 in (1.96 m)		1986–09–12	Southwestern-U
G	77	Karl Patrick Gloria (FF, HG)	6 ft 4 in (1.93 m)			National-U
F	88	Arex Tacoloy (HG)	6 ft 3 in (1.91 m)			National-U
F	99	Samboy de Leon	6 ft 3 in (1.91 m)		1992–03–09	Centro Escolar

Coaches

Head coach

- Elvis Tolentino

Assistant coach(es)

- Boying Diloy
- Apple Coronado
- Peter Deligero
- Jesus Ramon Pido
- Rysal Castro
- Delfin Dagcutan
- Jess James Bartolome
- Roderick Tolentino

Team manager

- Mermann Flores
- Valerie Flores

Legend

- (HG) Homegrown
- (FF) Filipino-foreigner
- (EA) EASL player
- (RS) Reserve player
- (S) Suspended
- Injured

- Roster – via Genius Sports
Updated as of: June 22, 2026

=== Head coaches ===
GenSan Warriors head coaches
#	Name	Start	End	Achievements	Ref.
1	Jesus Ramon Pido	2018	2019	—	
2	Rich Alvarez	2019–20	2020	—	
3	Ronnie Dojillo	2021	2021	—	
4	Marlon Martin	2022	2022	—	
5	Jesus Ramon Pido	2023	2023	—	
6	Rich Alvarez	2023	2023	—	
7	Elvis Tolentino	2024	current	—	

== Notable players ==
=== Individual award winners ===
MPBL Homegrown Player of the Year

- Cris Masaglang – 2023

All-MPBL Second Team

- Pamboy Raymundo – 2020

=== MPBL All-Star Day ===
All-Star selections

- Cris Masaglang – 2019, 2022
- Robby Celiz – 2020
- Nikko Panganiban – 2022
- Kyt Jimenez – 2023
- John Wilson – 2023
- Christian Fajarito – 2024
- Larry Rodriguez – 2024

=== PBA players ===
Ex-PBA players

- Val Acuña
- Ronjay Buenafe
- Mark Cardona
- Robby Celiz
- Jervy Cruz
- Mark Cruz
- Nico Elorde
- Jammer Jamito
- Khasim Mirza
- Pamboy Raymundo
- Larry Rodriguez
- Ervic Vijandre
- John Wilson

Drafted to PBA

- Mikey Williams – 4th overall, season 46
- Kyt Jimenez – 76th overall, season 48

=== Other notable players ===
- Gerald Anderson
- Bobby Pacquiao
- Manny Pacquiao

== Season-by-season records ==
=== Maharlika Pilipinas Basketball League ===
League champions
Division champions
Qualified for playoffs
Best regular season record

Season	Regular season							Playoffs	
Season	Division	Finish	GP	W	L	PCT	GB	Stage	Results
GenSan Warriors
2018–19; Datu Cup	South	4th	25	14	11	.560	6	Division quarterfinals	lost vs. Bacoor City, 0–2
2019–20; Lakan Season	South	7th	30	18	12	.600	8	Division quarterfinals	lost vs. Bacoor City, 0–2
2022	South	4th	21	15	6	.714	3	Division quarterfinals	lost vs. Bacolod, 1–2
2023	South	3rd	28	21	7	.750	2	Division quarterfinals Division semifinals	won vs. Muntinlupa, 2–1 lost vs. Batangas City, 1–2
South Cotabato Warriors
2024	South	6th	28	17	11	.607	4	Division quarterfinals Division semifinals	won vs. Biñan, 2–1 lost vs. Batangas City, 1–2
GenSan Warriors
2025	South	5th	29	18	11	.621	7	Division quarterfinals Division semifinals	won vs. Basilan, 2–1 lost vs. Quezon, 0–2
2026	South	3rd	25	19	6	.760	2	Division quarterfinals	lost vs. Rizal, 0–2
All-time regular season record			186	122	64	.656		7 playoff appearances	
All-time playoff record			26	9	17	.346		0 finals appearances	
All-time overall record			212	131	81	.618		0 championships	

=== Pilipinas Super League ===
Season	Regular season						Playoffs	
Season	Finish	GP	W	L	PCT	GB	Stage	Results
GenSan Warriors
2024–25; President's Cup	2nd	10	8	2	.800	1	Semifinals	lost vs. San Juan, 0–2
All-time regular season record		10	8	2	.800		1 playoff appearance	
All-time playoff record		2	0	2	.000		0 finals appearances	
All-time overall record		12	8	4	.667		0 championships	
