= 2021 MPBL Invitational =

Preseason tournament for the Maharlika Pilipinas Basketball League's 2022 season

Chooks-to-Go MPBL Invitational powered by TM

Tournament details
- Country: Philippines
- City: Pasay
- Venue(s): SM Mall of Asia Arena
- Dates: December 11–23, 2021
- Teams: 22

Final positions
- Champions: Basilan Jumbo Plastic
- Runners-up: Nueva Ecija Rice Vanguards
- Third place: Pasig Sta. Lucia Realtors
- Fourth place: Imus Buracai de Laiya

Tournament statistics
- Matches played: 57

The 2021 MPBL Invitational was the preseason tournament for the Maharlika Pilipinas Basketball League's 2022 season and the first edition of what would become the MPBL Preseason Invitational. The tournament began on December 11, 2021 and ended on December 23, 2021 when the Basilan Jumbo Plastic beat the Nueva Ecija Rice Vanguards in overtime, 83–80. Philip Manalang, who hit the championship-winning buzzer beater for Basilan, was adjudged as the tournament Finals MVP.

All games were played at the SM Mall of Asia Arena in Pasay at 50% capacity, making it the first pro sports event in the Philippines to allow live spectators since the onset of the COVID-19 pandemic. The tournament was contested by 22 teams, which is currently the most for a Preseason Invitational.

Chooks-to-Go continued to be the league's title sponsor after taking over the league's basketball operations in October 2021 while TM became the league's presenting sponsor, hence the tournament is officially known as the Chooks-to-Go MPBL Invitational powered by TM.

== Background ==
After culminating its 2019–20 season in March 2021, the league looked to start the next season on June 12, 2021. However, the continuing restrictions posed by the COVID-19 pandemic in the Philippines caused the league to postpone it to the third quarter of 2021. After postponing again to 2022, Duremdes announced the Invitational tournament to help "reignite" the league.

Although it wasn't the league's first preseason tournament, it was the league's first event as a professional league, being granted professional status by the Games and Amusements Board earlier in the year.

== Entertainment ==
For the first time since the level of restriction for live musical events were relaxed, Filipino pop and R&B band South Border performed their reunion concert at the pregame ceremony of the Invitational finals, while rock band MOJOFLY performed during the halftime show.

== Teams ==
Of the 31 teams that participated in the previous season, 21 took part in the Invitational. In addition, the Invitational also featured the first appearance of the Negros Muscovados, bringing the total to 22 teams.

List of 2021 MPBL Invitational teams
| Team | 2019–20 season statistics | |
| Team | Record | Playoff result |
|---|---|---|
| All-Star Bacolod Ballers (Note: Competed as Bacolod Master Sardines during the 2019–20 season. The name was later changed to Bacolod Bingo Plus for the 2022 season.) | 11–19 (.367) | – |
| Bacoor City Strikers | 24–6 (.800) | Division Semifinals |
| Basilan Jumbo Plastic (Note: Competed as Basilan Steel during the 2019–20 season.) | 20–10 (.667) | Division Finals |
| Bicol Volcanoes | 16–14 (.533) | Division Quarterfinals |
| Bulacan Kuyas | 19–11 (.633) | Division Quarterfinals |
| Caloocan Excellence (Note: Competed as Caloocan Supremos during the 2019–20 season. The new name would remain for the 2022 season.) | 16–14 (.533) | – |
| GenSan Warriors | 18–12 (.600) | Division Quarterfinals |
| Iloilo United Royals | 18–12 (.600) | Division Quarterfinals |
| Imus Buracai de Laiya (Note: Competed as Imus Bandera during the 2019–20 season. The name change was only made temporary but was slightly changed to Imus City Bandera for the 2022 season.) | 6–24 (.200) | – |
| Laguna Heroes (Note: Competed as Biñan City Heroes/Luxxe White during the 2019–20 season. The new name would remain for the 2022 season.) | 12–18 (.400) | – |
| Makati FSD Blazers (Note: Competed as Makati Super Crunch during the 2019–20 season. The name was later changed to Makati × MNL Kingpin for the 2022 season.) | 22–8 (.733) | Division Finals |
| Manila Stars | 25–5 (.833) | Division Semifinals |
| Marikina Shoe City (Note: Competed as Marikina Shoemasters during the 2019–20 season. The name change was only made temporary for the Invitational.) | 8–22 (.267) | – |
| Mindoro EOG Burlington (Note: Competed as Mindoro Tamaraws during the 2019–20 season. The name change was only made temporary but was slightly changed to Mindoro Tams for the 2022 season.) | 9–21 (.300) | – |
| Muntinlupa Cagers | 7–23 (.233) | – |
| Negros Muscovados (Note: The Negros Muscovados wouldn't compete full-time until the 2023 season.) | — | |
| Nueva Ecija Rice Vanguards | 10–20 (.333) | – |
| Pasig Sta. Lucia Realtors (Note: The name was later changed to Pasig City for the 2022 season.) | 18–12 (.600) | Division Quarterfinals |
| Rizal Emkai Xentromall (Note: Competed as Rizal Golden Coolers during the 2019–20 season. The name change was only made temporary for the Invitational.) | 6–23 (.207) | – |
| San Juan Knights | 26–4 (.867) | National Finals |
| Sarangani Marlins | 1–29 (.033) | – |
| Valenzuela MJAS Zenith (Note: Competed as Val City Carga Backload Solution during the 2019–20 season. The name was later changed to Valenzuela XUR Homes Realty Inc. for the 2022 season.) | 11–19 (.367) | – |

=== Draw ===
The draw for the group stage took place on November 26, 2021 at the Crowne Plaza in Pasig, hosted by Mark Zambrano and Christian Luanzon. The 22 teams were drawn into four groups, two groups of six teams (Groups A and D) and two groups of five teams (Groups B and C).

Two teams were immediately allocated, the Basilan Jumbo Plastic was placed in Group B by virtue of winning the 2021 Pilipinas VisMin Super Cup 1st Conference. The San Juan Knights were placed in Group C as last season's finalists. The remaining 20 teams were drawn at random into the four groups.

== Format ==
The tournament is divided into two stages: the group stage and the playoffs. Each of the four groups play in a single round-robin format, wherein each team plays one game against all other teams within the same group. The top two teams in each group advance to a three-round, single-elimination playoffs consisting of all knockout games. For this tournament only, all roster regulations were lifted.

The top three teams were given prize money based on their standings: ₱2 million for the champion, ₱500,000 for the runner-up, and ₱250,000 for the third-place team.

== Group stage ==
=== Group A ===
| Pos | Team | Pld | W | L | PF | PA | PD | Qualification | PSG | ILO | BCD | BCR | CAL | NEG |
|---|---|---|---|---|---|---|---|---|---|---|---|---|---|---|
| 1 | Pasig Sta. Lucia Realtors | 5 | 5 | 0 | 424 | 330 | +94 | Playoffs | — | 90–69 | 86–61 | 76–67 | 87–60 | 85–73 |
| 2 | Iloilo United Royals | 5 | 4 | 1 | 388 | 364 | +24 | Playoffs | 69–90 | — | 85–62 | 71–66 | 80–69 | 83–77 |
| 3 | All-Star Bacolod Ballers | 5 | 3 | 2 | 349 | 374 | −25 | | 61–86 | 62–85 | — | 73–71 | 85–65 | 68–67 |
| 4 | Bacoor City Strikers | 5 | 2 | 3 | 363 | 356 | +7 | | 67–76 | 66–71 | 71–73 | — | 72–50 | 87–86 |
| 5 | Caloocan Excellence | 5 | 1 | 4 | 324 | 403 | −79 | | 60–87 | 69–80 | 65–85 | 50–72 | — | 80–79 |
| 6 | Negros Muscovados | 5 | 0 | 5 | 382 | 403 | −21 | | 73–85 | 77–83 | 67–68 | 86–87 | 79–80 | — |

Source: Schedule – via Genius Sports
Rules for classification: 1) Wins; 2a) If two teams are tied, head-to-head match-up; 2b) If three or more teams are tied, head-to-head point quotient; 3) overall point quotient; 4) coin toss.

=== Group B ===
| Pos | Team | Pld | W | L | PF | PA | PD | Qualification | BAS | BCL | MKT | MAR | LAG |
|---|---|---|---|---|---|---|---|---|---|---|---|---|---|
| 1 | Basilan Jumbo Plastic | 4 | 4 | 0 | 346 | 322 | +24 | Playoffs | — | 70–65 | 80–79 | 98–83 | 98–95 |
| 2 | Bicol Volcanoes | 4 | 3 | 1 | 317 | 274 | +43 | Playoffs | 65–70 | — | 86–71 | 86–65 | 80–68 |
| 3 | Makati FSD Blazers | 4 | 2 | 2 | 337 | 341 | −4 | | 79–80 | 71–86 | — | 95–89 | 92–86 |
| 4 | Marikina Shoe City | 4 | 1 | 3 | 316 | 352 | −36 | | 83–98 | 65–86 | 89–95 | — | 79–73 |
| 5 | Laguna Heroes | 4 | 0 | 4 | 322 | 349 | −27 | | 95–98 | 68–80 | 86–92 | 73–79 | — |

Source: Schedule – via Genius Sports
Rules for classification: 1) Wins; 2a) If two teams are tied, head-to-head match-up; 2b) If three or more teams are tied, head-to-head point quotient; 3) overall point quotient; 4) coin toss.

=== Group C ===
| Pos | Team | Pld | W | L | PF | PA | PD | Qualification | NE | SJ | VAL | SAR | MUN |
|---|---|---|---|---|---|---|---|---|---|---|---|---|---|
| 1 | Nueva Ecija Rice Vanguards | 4 | 4 | 0 | 371 | 326 | +45 | Playoffs | — | 88–85 | 100–77 | 99–92 | 84–72 |
| 2 | San Juan Knights | 4 | 3 | 1 | 344 | 291 | +53 | Playoffs | 85–88 | — | 97–64 | 91–72 | 71–67 |
| 3 | Valenzuela MJAS Zenith | 4 | 2 | 2 | 294 | 342 | −48 | | 77–100 | 64–97 | — | 77–73 | 76–72 |
| 4 | Sarangani Marlins | 4 | 1 | 3 | 312 | 333 | −21 | | 92–99 | 72–91 | 73–77 | — | 75–66 |
| 5 | Muntinlupa Cagers | 4 | 0 | 4 | 277 | 306 | −29 | | 72–84 | 67–71 | 72–76 | 66–75 | — |

Source: Schedule – via Genius Sports
Rules for classification: 1) Wins; 2a) If two teams are tied, head-to-head match-up; 2b) If three or more teams are tied, head-to-head point quotient; 3) overall point quotient; 4) coin toss.

=== Group D ===
| Pos | Team | Pld | W | L | PF | PA | PD | Qualification | IMS | MDR | MNL | BUL | RZL | GS |
|---|---|---|---|---|---|---|---|---|---|---|---|---|---|---|
| 1 | Imus Buracai de Laiya | 5 | 4 (Note: Imus wins tiebreaker over Mindoro by head-to-head victory.) | 1 | 393 | 363 | +30 | Playoffs | — | 77–70 | 77–83 | 75–65 | 90–79 | 74–66 |
| 2 | Mindoro EOG Burlington | 5 | 4 | 1 | 402 | 382 | +20 | Playoffs | 70–77 | — | 80–77 | 79–72 | 86–83 | 87–73 |
| 3 | Manila Stars | 5 | 3 | 2 | 413 | 379 | +34 | | 83–77 | 77–80 | — | 89–98 | 89–59 | 75–65 |
| 4 | Bulacan Kuyas | 5 | 2 | 3 | 404 | 412 | −8 | | 65–75 | 72–79 | 98–89 | — | 87–79 | 82–90 |
| 5 | Rizal Emkai Xentromall | 5 | 1 (Note: Rizal wins tiebreaker over General Santos by head-to-head victory.) | 4 | 373 | 418 | −45 | | 79–90 | 83–86 | 59–89 | 79–87 | — | 73–66 |
| 6 | GenSan Warriors | 5 | 1 | 4 | 360 | 391 | −31 | | 66–74 | 73–87 | 65–75 | 90–82 | 66–73 | — |

Source: Schedule – via Genius Sports
Rules for classification: 1) Wins; 2a) If two teams are tied, head-to-head match-up; 2b) If three or more teams are tied, head-to-head point quotient; 3) overall point quotient; 4) coin toss.

== Playoffs ==
=== Bracket ===
Quarterfinals
A1 | Pasig | 70
C2 | San Juan | 66
B1 | Basilan | 77
D2 | Mindoro | 72
C1 | Nueva Ecija | 80
A2 | Iloilo | 67
D1 | Imus | 74
B2 | Bicol | 57

Semifinals
A1 | Pasig | 72
B1 | Basilan | 77
C1 | Nueva Ecija | 82
D1 | Imus | 76

Finals
B1 | Basilan (OT) | 83
C1 | Nueva Ecija | 80
Battle for Third
A1 | Pasig | 100
D1 | Imus | 80

(*) denotes number of overtime periods

=== Quarterfinals ===
IBC

December 21
2:30 pm

Box score

| Pasig Sta. Lucia Realtors | 70–66 | San Juan Knights |
Scoring by quarter: 17–20, 23–19, 14–15, 16–12
| Pts: Jerald Bautista 12; Rebs: Justin Arana 11; Asts: Rudy Lingganay, Jeric Teng 3 | | Pts: John Michael Calma 13; Rebs: Jhonard Clarito 13; Asts: Orlan Wamar Jr. 4 |

SM Mall of Asia Arena, Pasay

IBC

December 21
5:00 pm

Box score

| Basilan Jumbo Plastic | 77–72 | Mindoro EOG Burlington |
Scoring by quarter: 17–16, 19–15, 26–17, 15–24
| Pts: Jeric Encho Serrano 22; Rebs: JR Taganas 12; Asts: Philip Manalang 7 | | Pts: Nathaniel Cosejo 22; Rebs: Nathaniel Cosejo 11; Asts: Ryusei Koga 7 |

SM Mall of Asia Arena, Pasay

IBC

December 21
7:30 pm

Box score

| Imus Buracai de Laiya | 74–57 | Bicol Volcanoes |
Scoring by quarter: 21–19, 17–18, 18–14, 18–6
| Pts: Leo Najorda 23; Rebs: Jhaymo Eguilos 15; Asts: Christian Ian Melencio 6 | | Pts: Zachary Huang 12; Rebs: Zachary Huang, Mark Yee 7 Asts: Mac Tallo, Jayvee Marcelino 3 |

SM Mall of Asia Arena, Pasay

IBC

December 21
10:00 pm

Box score

| Nueva Ecija Rice Vanguards | 84–67 | Iloilo United Royals |
Scoring by quarter: 20–16, 23–16, 27–24, 14–11
| Pts: Michael Mabulac 17; Rebs: Michael Mabulac 11; Asts: Christopher Bitoon 9 | | Pts: Levi Hernandez 26; Rebs: Jayson David 7 Asts: Aaron Jeruta 6 |

SM Mall of Asia Arena, Pasay

=== Semifinals ===
IBC

December 22
7:30 pm

Box score

| Pasig Sta. Lucia Realtors | 72–77 | Basilan Jumbo Plastic |
Scoring by quarter: 16–24, 19–25, 18–16, 19–12
| Pts: Fran Yu 22; Rebs: Cedric Ablaza 9 Asts: Fran Yu 4 | | Pts: Michael Juico 23; Rebs: JR Taganas 10; Asts: Philip Manalang 8 |

SM Mall of Asia Arena, Pasay

IBC

December 22
10:00 pm

Box score

| Imus Buracai de Laiya | 76–82 | Nueva Ecija Rice Vanguards |
Scoring by quarter: 16–18, 19–19, 18–16, 23–29
| Pts: Leo Najorda 24; Rebs: Jhaymo Eguilos 9 Asts: Christian Ian Melencio 3 | | Pts: Michael Mabulac 17; Rebs: Michael Mabulac 15; Asts: Justin Gutang, Michael Mabulac 5 |

SM Mall of Asia Arena, Pasay

=== Battle for Third ===
IBC

December 23
1:00 pm

Box score

| Pasig Sta. Lucia Realtors | 100–80 | Imus Buracai de Laiya |
Scoring by quarter: 23–19, 30–22, 24–15, 23–24
| Pts: Jeckster Apinan 16; Rebs: Jeckster Apinan 9 Asts: Jeric Teng 5 | | Pts: Genmar Bragais 23; Rebs: Genmar Bragais, Christian Ian Melencio 6 Asts: Jhaymo Eguilos, Christian Ian Melencio 4 |

SM Mall of Asia Arena, Pasay

=== Finals ===
IBC

December 23
8:30 pm

Box score

| Basilan Jumbo Plastic | 83–80 (OT) | Nueva Ecija Rice Vanguards |
Scoring by quarter: 17–20, 18–16, 18–16, 21–22, Overtime: 9–6
| Pts: Four players 15; Rebs: JR Taganas 17; Asts: Jay Collado 7 | | Pts: Michael Mabulac 24; Rebs: Michael Mabulac 11; Asts: Diego Dario 5 |

SM Mall of Asia Arena, Pasay

In the final possession of the game, Philip Manalang would attempt a three-point shot which, if successful, Basilan would win the Invitational tournament, otherwise the game would go into double overtime. The shot ended up being successful, giving Basilan the lead as they won the 2021 MPBL Invitational. For his championship-winning buzzer beater, Manalang was declared the Finals MVP of the tournament.

== Statistics ==
=== Individual statistical leaders ===
| Category | Player | Team | Statistic |
|---|---|---|---|
| Points per game | James Martinez | Bulacan Kuyas | 20.5 |
| Rebounds per game | Renato Ular | Marikina Shoe City | 16.0 |
| Assists per game | Andrey Armenion | Valenzuela MJAS Zenith | 6.5 |
| Steals per game | Marte Gil | Caloocan Excellence | 3.6 |
| Blocks per game | Ramon Mabayo | Caloocan Excellence | 2.0 |
| Fouls per game | Vincent Importante | Manila Stars | 4.0 |
| Minutes per game | Ramon Mabayo | Caloocan Excellence | 33.6 |
| FG% | John Ambulodto | Manila Stars | 77.8% |
| FT% | Ronjay Buenafe | GenSan Warriors | 91.7% |
| 3FG% | Ronjay Buenafe | GenSan Warriors | 52.4% |

=== Team statistical leaders ===
| Category | Team | Statistic |
|---|---|---|
| Points per game | Nueva Ecija Rice Vanguards | 88.1 |
| Rebounds per game | Basilan Jumbo Plastic | 54.0 |
| Assists per game | Nueva Ecija Rice Vanguards | 22.9 |
| Steals per game | Negros Muscovados | 11.4 |
| Blocks per game | All-Star Bacolod Ballers | 4.8 |
| Turnovers per game | All-Star Bacolod Ballers | 20.2 |
| Fouls per game | Negros Muscovados | 23.8 |

== Awards ==
The individual league awards was given during the Semifinals of the 2021 MPBL Invitational at the Mall of Asia Arena in Pasay. The Finals Most Valuable Player was given out after the final game.

| Awards | Winner (s) | Team |
|---|---|---|
| Most Valuable Player | Michael Mabulac | Nueva Ecija Rice Vanguards |
| Finals Most Valuable Player | Philip Manalang | Basilan Jumbo Plastic |
| Defensive Player of the Year | Renato Ular | Marikina Shoe City |
| All-MPBL First Team | Michael Mabulac | Nueva Ecija Rice Vanguards |
| All-MPBL First Team | Mac Tallo | Bicol Volcanoes |
| All-MPBL First Team | Adi Santos | Imus Buracai de Laiya |
| All-MPBL First Team | Fran Yu | Pasig Sta. Lucia Realtors |
| All-MPBL First Team | Michael Juico | Basilan Jumbo Plastic |

== Media coverage ==
While the league was looking for a new broadcast partner as a result of the shutdown of ABS-CBN broadcasting, the television broadcast rights for the inaugural Preseason Invitational were handled by the Intercontinental Broadcasting Corporation (IBC). The streaming rights went to TAP Digital Media Ventures Corporation, which streamed the games on its TAP Go service. The league continued to broadcast all of the games online on its Facebook page.
