= 2018 MPBL playoffs =

Playoffs for the Maharlika Pilipinas Basketball League's 2018 season

MPBL Anta–Rajah Cup Playoffs

Tournament details
- Country: Philippines
- Dates: March 20 – April 19, 2018
- Teams: 8

Final positions
- Champions: Batangas City Athletics
- Runners-up: Muntinlupa Cagers
- Semifinalists: Valenzuela Classic; Parañaque Patriots

Tournament statistics
- Matches played: 19

The 2018 MPBL playoffs, also known as the MPBL Anta–Rajah Cup playoffs, was the postseason tournament of the Maharlika Pilipinas Basketball League's inaugural 2018 season. This was the league's first postseason tournament, and the only tournament under the eight-team format. It began on March 20, 2018, three days after the regular season, and ended on April 10, 2018 where the Batangas City Athletics beat the Muntinlupa Cagers in the 2018 MPBL finals.

== Overview ==
- The Batangas City Athletics entered the playoffs for the first time in team history and clinched the best record in the league for the first time.
- All other qualified teams entered the playoffs for the first time.

== Format ==
The top eight teams overall advanced to the playoffs. Seeding was based on winning percentage, with tiebreaker rules applied should multiple teams have the same record. The single-elimination bracket consists of three rounds with no reseeding. The first two rounds were best-of-three series and the finals was a best-of-five series.

During the first two rounds, two games were played in a gameday, with homecourt advantage alternating between the higher-seeded teams of each series. A traditional homecourt format was then used for the national finals using a 2-2-1 format.

== Standings ==
Pos	Team	Pld	W	L	PCT	GB	Qualification
1	Batangas City Athletics	9	8	1	.889	—	Playoffs
2	Bulacan Kuyas	9	6	3	.667 (Note: Bulacan (1.032), Muntinlupa (1.006), Valenzuela (0.965) are ranked by head-to-head point quotient.)	2	Playoffs
3	Muntinlupa Cagers	9	6	3	.667	2	Playoffs
4	Valenzuela Classic	9	6	3	.667	2	Playoffs
5	Quezon City Capitals	9	5	4	.556 (Note: Quezon City wins tiebreaker over Navotas by head-to-head victory.)	3	Playoffs
6	Navotas Clutch	9	5	4	.556	3	Playoffs
7	Parañaque Patriots	9	4	5	.444	4	Playoffs
8	Bataan Defenders	9	2	7	.222 (Note: Bataan wins tiebreaker over Imus by head-to-head victory.)	6	Playoffs

Source: Standings

== Bracket ==
Quarterfinals (best-of-3)
1	Batangas City	2
8	Bataan	0
4	Valenzuela	2
5	Quezon City	1
2	Bulacan	1
7	Parañaque	2
3	Muntinlupa	2
6	Navotas	0

Semifinals (best-of-3)
1	Batangas City	2
4	Valenzuela	0
7	Parañaque	1
3	Muntinlupa	2

Finals (best-of-5)
1	Batangas City	3
3	Muntinlupa	1

== Quarterfinals ==
=== (1) Batangas City Athletics vs. (8) Bataan Defenders ===
S+A

March 20
09:00 pm

Box score

Bataan Defenders	75–88	Batangas City Tanduay Athletics
Scoring by quarter: 14–21, 19–28, 16–23, 26–16
Pts: Gary David 24; Rebs: Arvie Bringas 8 Asts: James Castro 5		Pts: Val Acuña 16; Rebs: Jaymo Eguilos 8 Asts: Lester Alvarez 10

Batangas City Coliseum, Batangas City

S+A

March 24
07:00 pm

Box score

Batangas City Tanduay Athletics	95–82	Bataan Defenders
Scoring by quarter: 21–23, 25–19, 26–16, 23–24
Pts: Lester Alvarez 17; Rebs: Jaymo Eguilos 8 Asts: Lester Alvarez 6		Pts: James Castro 21; Rebs: James Castro 7 Asts: James Castro 7
Batangas wins series, 2–0

Valenzuela City Astrodome, Valenzuela City

=== (2) Bulacan Kuyas vs. (7) Parañaque Patriots ===
S+A

March 22
09:00 pm

Box score

Parañaque Patriots	73–83	Bulacan Kuyas
Scoring by quarter: 13–27, 22–8, 16–24, 22–24
Pts: Juneric Baloria 16; Rebs: Harold Arboleda 13; Asts: Harold Arboleda 5		Pts: Stephen Siruma 24; Rebs: Jay-R Taganas 16; Asts: Stephen Siruma 8

Bulacan Capitol Gymnasium, Malolos City, Bulacan

S+A

March 27
07:00 pm

Box score

Bulacan Kuyas	54–81	Parañaque Patriots
Scoring by quarter: 11–20, 16–20, 12–23, 15–18
Pts: Jorey Napoles 12; Rebs: Jorey Napoles 7 Asts: Jay-R Taganas 3		Pts: Juneric Baloria 26; Rebs: Harold Arboleda 13; Asts: Mark Montilla 6

Muntinlupa Sports Center, Muntinlupa

S+A

April 3
09:00 pm

Boxscore

Parañaque Patriots	77–70	Bulacan Kuyas
Scoring by quarter: 23–16, 16–25, 25–9, 13–20
Pts: Juneric Baloria 16; Rebs: Harold Arboleda 11; Asts: Ryusei Koga and Juneric Baloria 3 each		Pts: Hernal Escosio 13; Rebs: Jorey Napoles 11; Asts: Mark Monte 3
Parañaque wins series, 2–1

Bulacan Capitol Gymnasium, Malolos City, Bulacan

=== (3) Muntinlupa Cagers vs. (6) Navotas Clutch ===
S+A

March 22
07:00 pm

Box score

Muntinlupa Cagers	83–77	Navotas Clutch
Scoring by quarter: 13–22, 20–14, 20–20, 30–21
Pts: Chito Jaime 19; Rebs: Felix Apreku 11; Asts: Allan Mangahas 5		Pts: JP Calvo 12; Rebs: Chester Saldua 13; Asts: JP Calvo 7

Bulacan Capitol Gymnasium, Malolos City, Bulacan

S+A

March 27
09:00 pm

Navotas Clutch	69–72	Muntinlupa Cagers
Scoring by quarter: 16–16, 12–21, 20–14, 21–21
Pts: JP Calvo 20; Rebs: Jamil Gabawan 17; Asts: Ron Dennison 4		Pts: Allan Mangahas 23; Rebs: Felix Apreku 14; Asts: Allan Mangahas 6
Muntinlupa wins series, 2–0

Muntinlupa Sports Center, Muntinlupa

=== (4) Valenzuela Classic vs. (5) Quezon City Capitals ===
S+A

March 20
07:00 pm

Box score

Quezon City Capitals	89–96	Valenzuela Classic
Scoring by quarter: 27–14, 19–24, 26–29, 17–29
Pts: James Collado 19; Rebs: Gian Abrigo 13; Asts: Hesed Gabo 9		Pts: Rocky Acidre 21; Rebs: Henryford Ruaya 7 Asts: Rocky Acidre 5

Batangas City Coliseum, Batangas City

S+A

March 24
09:00 pm

Box score

Valenzuela Classic	68–76	Quezon City Capitals
Scoring by quarter: 17–14, 15–21, 14–19, 22–22
Pts: Henryford Ruaya 17; Rebs: Jeff Javillonar 10; Asts: RJ Argamino 4		Pts: Hesed Gabo 17; Rebs: James Collado 10; Asts: Gian Abrigo 3

Valenzuela City Astrodome, Valenzuela City

S+A

April 3
07:00 pm

Boxscore

Quezon City Capitals	72–74	Valenzuela Classic
Scoring by quarter: 26–23, 15–18, 20–18, 11–15
Pts: PeeJay Barua 23; Rebs: James Collado 8 Asts: Hesed Gabo 7		Pts: Paolo Hubalde 21; Rebs: Henryford Ruaya 10; Asts: Paolo Hubalde 6
Valenzuela wins series, 2–1

Bulacan Capitol Gymnasium, Malolos City, Bulacan

== Semifinals ==
=== (1) Batangas City Athletics vs. (4) Valenzuela Classic ===
S+A

April 5
09:00 pm

Boxscore

Batangas City Tanduay Athletics	80–75	Valenzuela Classic
Scoring by quarter: 30–8, 10–27, 17–16, 23–24
Pts: Paul Varilla 17; Rebs: John Quinto 7 Asts: Lester Alvarez 6		Pts: Adrian Celada 23; Rebs: Adrian Celada 10; Asts: Adrian Celada 5

Batangas City Coliseum, Batangas City

S+A

April 7
07:00 pm

Boxscore

Valenzuela Classic	64–89	Batangas City Tanduay Athletics
Scoring by quarter: 15–24, 21–16, 18–28, 10–21
Pts: Paolo Hubalde 12; Rebs: Mark Andaya 11; Asts: RJ Argamino 5		Pts: Val Acuña 16; Rebs: Dennice Villamor 10; Asts: Bernabe Teodoro 3
Batangas wins series, 2–0

Muntinlupa Sports Center, Muntinlupa

=== (3) Muntinlupa Cagers vs. (7) Parañaque Patriots ===
S+A

April 5
07:00 pm

Boxscore

Parañaque Patriots	84–59	Muntinlupa Cagers
Scoring by quarter: 27–12, 23–16, 12–18, 22–13
Pts: Ryusei Koga 24; Rebs: Harold Arboleda 9 Asts: Ryusei Koga 8		Pts: Dave Moralde 16; Rebs: Felix Apreku 11; Asts: Al Vergara 3

Batangas City Coliseum, Batangas City

S+A

April 7
09:00 pm

Boxscore

Muntinlupa Cagers	66–56	Parañaque Patriots
Scoring by quarter: 19–13, 16–21, 11–6, 20–16
Pts: Chito Jaime 26; Rebs: Felix Apreku 14; Asts: Allan Mangahas 7		Pts: Juneric Baloria 17; Rebs: Harold Arboleda 14; Asts: Ryusei Koga 4

Muntinlupa Sports Center, Muntinlupa

S+A

April 10
07:00 pm

Boxscore

Parañaque Patriots	70–81	Muntinlupa Cagers
Scoring by quarter: 24–14, 16–17, 11–26, 19–24
Pts: Harold Arboleda 18; Rebs: Harold Arboleda 14; Asts: Harold Arboleda 7		Pts: Chito Jaime 22; Rebs: Felix Apreku 16; Asts: Allan Mangahas 5
Muntinlupa wins series, 2–1

Muntinlupa Sports Center, Muntinlupa

== MPBL finals: (1) Batangas City Athletics vs. (3) Muntinlupa Cagers ==
S+A

April 12
08:00 pm

Boxscore

Batangas City Athletics	70–64	Muntinlupa Cagers
Scoring by quarter: 16–14, 10–16, 22–14, 22–20
Pts: Bernabe Teodoro 20; Rebs: Mark Olayon 9 Asts: Bernabe Teodoro 4		Pts: Dave Moralde 12; Rebs: Felix Apreku 9 Asts: Allan Mangahas 4
Batangas leads series, 1–0

Batangas City Coliseum, Batangas City
Referees: Geraldo Gabriel, Don Al De Dios, Julius Tiquio

S+A

April 14
08:00 pm

Boxscore

Batangas City Athletics	78–74	Muntinlupa Cagers
Scoring by quarter: 13–14, 25–10, 22–22, 18–28
Pts: Jaymo Eguilos 16; Rebs: John Quinto 9 Asts: Lester Alvarez 7		Pts: Chito Jaime 18; Rebs: Felix Apreku 10; Asts: Allan Mangahas 4
Batangas leads series, 2–0

Batangas City Coliseum, Batangas City
Referees: Jorge Serapia, Jhovet Ocfemia, Rommel Alcoran

S+A

April 17
08:00 pm

Boxscore

Muntinlupa Cagers	82–77	Batangas City Athletics
Scoring by quarter: 27–14, 17–22, 20–15, 18–26
Pts: Allan Mangahas 23; Rebs: Felix Apreku 13; Asts: Allan Mangahas 8		Pts: John Quinto 14; Rebs: Jaymo Eguilos 12; Asts: Mark Olayon 5
Batangas leads series, 2–1

Muntinlupa Sports Center, Muntinlupa
Referees: Dan Marabe, Geraldo Gabriel, Bert Gica

S+A

April 19
08:00 pm

Boxscore

Muntinlupa Cagers	66–68	Batangas City Athletics
Scoring by quarter: 12–16, 16–27, 19–11, 11–14
Pts: Pari Llagas 19; Rebs: Pari Llagas 14; Asts: Allan Mangahas 3		Pts: Moncrief Rogado 14; Rebs: Paul Varilla 9 Asts: Mark Olayon, Bernabe Teodoro 4 each
Batangas wins series, 3–1

Muntinlupa Sports Center, Muntinlupa
Referees: Geraldo Gabriel, Don Al De Dios, Rey Dillena

== Media ==
All playoff games this season were aired on ABS-CBN's S+A channel as part of its broadcast rights with the league.
