= 2018 MPBL finals =

Championship series of the Maharlika Pilipinas Basketball League's 2018 season

Team	Coach	Wins
Batangas City Athletics	Michael Tan	3
Muntinlupa Cagers	Aldrin Morante	1
- Dates: April 12–19
- MVP: Val Acuña

The 2018 MPBL finals, also known as the MPBL Anta-Rajah Cup finals, was the championship series of the Maharlika Pilipinas Basketball League's (MPBL) inaugural 2018 season and the conclusion of the season's playoffs. In the best-of-five playoff, the Batangas City Athletics defeated the Muntinlupa Cagers, 3–1, as they were crowned the inaugural MPBL champions. Val Acuña is also named the inaugural MPBL Finals MVP.

First-seeded Batangas City (8–1) had homecourt advantage heading into the finals, having the better record as opposed to third-seeded Muntinlupa (6–3). As of 2023, it is the only finals appearance for either team.

== Road to the finals ==
Batangas City Athletics		Muntinlupa Cagers
Pos / Team / Pld / W / L / PCT / GB / Qualification; 1 / Batangas City Athletics / 9 / 8 / 1 / .889 / — / Playoffs; 2 / Bulacan Kuyas / 9 / 6 / 3 / .667 (Note: Bulacan (1.032), Muntinlupa (1.006), Valenzuela (0.965) are ranked by head-to-head point quotient.) / 2 / Playoffs; 3 / Muntinlupa Cagers / 9 / 6 / 3 / .667 / 2 / Playoffs; 4 / Valenzuela Classic / 9 / 6 / 3 / .667 / 2 / Playoffs; 5 / Quezon City Capitals / 9 / 5 / 4 / .556 (Note: Quezon City wins tiebreaker over Navotas by head-to-head victory.) / 3 / Playoffs; 6 / Navotas Clutch / 9 / 5 / 4 / .556 / 3 / Playoffs; 7 / Parañaque Patriots / 9 / 4 / 5 / .444 / 4 / Playoffs; 8 / Bataan Defenders / 9 / 2 / 7 / .222 (Note: Bataan wins tiebreaker over Imus by head-to-head victory.) / 6 / Playoffs; 9 / Imus Bandera / 9 / 2 / 7 / .222 / 6; 10 / Caloocan Supremos / 9 / 1 / 8 / .111 / 7; Source: Standings; Notes:	Regular season	Pos / Team / Pld / W / L / PCT / GB / Qualification; 1 / Batangas City Athletics / 9 / 8 / 1 / .889 / — / Playoffs; 2 / Bulacan Kuyas / 9 / 6 / 3 / .667 (Note: Bulacan (1.032), Muntinlupa (1.006), Valenzuela (0.965) are ranked by head-to-head point quotient.) / 2 / Playoffs; 3 / Muntinlupa Cagers / 9 / 6 / 3 / .667 / 2 / Playoffs; 4 / Valenzuela Classic / 9 / 6 / 3 / .667 / 2 / Playoffs; 5 / Quezon City Capitals / 9 / 5 / 4 / .556 (Note: Quezon City wins tiebreaker over Navotas by head-to-head victory.) / 3 / Playoffs; 6 / Navotas Clutch / 9 / 5 / 4 / .556 / 3 / Playoffs; 7 / Parañaque Patriots / 9 / 4 / 5 / .444 / 4 / Playoffs; 8 / Bataan Defenders / 9 / 2 / 7 / .222 (Note: Bataan wins tiebreaker over Imus by head-to-head victory.) / 6 / Playoffs; 9 / Imus Bandera / 9 / 2 / 7 / .222 / 6; 10 / Caloocan Supremos / 9 / 1 / 8 / .111 / 7; Source: Standings; Notes:
Defeated 8th-seeded Bataan Defenders, 2–0	Quarterfinals	Defeated 6th-seeded Navotas Clutch, 2–0
Defeated 4th-seeded Valenzuela Classic, 2–0	Semifinals	Defeated 7th-seeded Parañaque Patriots, 2–1

=== Head-to-head matchup ===
S+A

February 27
07:00 pm

Boxscore

Batangas City Tanduay Athletics	82–77	Muntinlupa Cagers
Scoring by quarter: 23–21, 18–25, 27–13, 14–18
Pts: Bernabe Teodoro 24; Rebs: Jaymo Eguilos 13; Asts: John Quinto, Lester Alvarez 4 each		Pts: Chito Jaime 18; Rebs: Chito Jaime 9 Asts: Allan Mangahas 4

Navotas Sports Complex, Navotas

== Series summary ==
Game	Date	Away team	Result	Home team	Venue
1	April 12	Muntinlupa Cagers	64–70; 0–1	Batangas City Athletics	Batangas City Coliseum
2	April 14	Muntinlupa Cagers	74–78; 0–2	Batangas City Athletics	Batangas City Coliseum
3	April 17	Batangas City Athletics	77–82; 2–1	Muntinlupa Cagers	Muntinlupa Sports Center
4	April 19	Batangas City Athletics	68–66; 3–1	Muntinlupa Cagers	Muntinlupa Sports Center

== Game summaries ==
=== Game 1 ===
S+A

April 12
08:00 pm

Boxscore

Batangas City Athletics	70–64	Muntinlupa Cagers
Scoring by quarter: 16–14, 10–16, 22–14, 22–20
Pts: Bernabe Teodoro 20; Rebs: Mark Olayon 9 Asts: Bernabe Teodoro 4		Pts: Dave Moralde 12; Rebs: Felix Apreku 9 Asts: Allan Mangahas 4
Batangas leads series, 1–0

Batangas City Coliseum, Batangas City
Referees: Geraldo Gabriel, Don Al De Dios, Julius Tiquio

Tey Teodoro made 20 points to pave the way for the Batangas City Athletics to claim the finals opener, as Val Acuna also added 14 points to help the team in the win. With the game tied at 64-all, Teodoro hit a free throw before scoring on a jump shot with 25 seconds left in the fourth period to give the Athletics a three-point lead. As the Cagers were unable to convert a basket, Teodoro managed to draw a foul from an Athletic and split his two charities given, which gave them a four-point lead in the final 14 seconds. And from there on, they were able to seal the victory and draw the first blood in the title series.

=== Game 2 ===
S+A

April 14
08:00 pm

Boxscore

Batangas City Athletics	78–74	Muntinlupa Cagers
Scoring by quarter: 13–14, 25–10, 22–22, 18–28
Pts: Jaymo Eguilos 16; Rebs: John Quinto 9 Asts: Lester Alvarez 7		Pts: Chito Jaime 18; Rebs: Felix Apreku 10; Asts: Allan Mangahas 4
Batangas leads series, 2–0

Batangas City Coliseum, Batangas City
Referees: Jorge Serapia, Jhovet Ocfemia, Rommel Alcoran

Jaymo Eguilos of the Athletics scored a jumper to extend their lead to 9, 74–65, with the final 1:14 left on the clock. After that shot, the Cagers went on to storm a 9-2 scoring run to cut the deficit to 2 points, 76–74, going in to the final 17 seconds. With Batangas holding to their tight defense, Teytey Teodoro was able to draw a foul on Chito Jaime, resulting to two charities being made as they hold on to their four-point victory, extending the series lead to 2–0 and one more win gives them the inaugural league championship and the possible first-ever finals sweep in the history of the league.

=== Game 3 ===
S+A

April 17
08:00 pm

Boxscore

Muntinlupa Cagers	82–77	Batangas City Athletics
Scoring by quarter: 27–14, 17–22, 20–15, 18–26
Pts: Allan Mangahas 23; Rebs: Felix Apreku 13; Asts: Allan Mangahas 8		Pts: John Quinto 14; Rebs: Jaymo Eguilos 12; Asts: Mark Olayon 5
Batangas leads series, 2–1

Muntinlupa Sports Center, Muntinlupa
Referees: Dan Marabe, Geraldo Gabriel, Bert Gica

This game marked the first loss of the Athletics since losing to the Bulacan Kuyas in the elimination round last March 3, also marks the team's first loss of the playoffs. In the fourth quarter, Batangas scared Muntinlupa with an 11-5 scoring run after being down by 15 points, 64–49, in the 1:04 mark of third quarter, with this run, the deficit was cut down to 9, 69–60, in the 6:38 mark of fourth quarter. But as Athletics not giving up to the fight, they would eventually cut down further the Cagers lead as close as 2, 79–77, in the final 49 seconds of the game. Dave Moralde had an answer to stop the bleeding, to reextend the lead to 4 with a one-hand jumper. As they were able to hold to their defense, they would eventually spoil the possible championship celebration and extend the series to a Game 4.

=== Game 4 ===
S+A

April 19
08:00 pm

Boxscore

Muntinlupa Cagers	66–68	Batangas City Athletics
Scoring by quarter: 12–16, 16–27, 19–11, 11–14
Pts: Pari Llagas 19; Rebs: Pari Llagas 14; Asts: Allan Mangahas 3		Pts: Moncrief Rogado 14; Rebs: Paul Varilla 9 Asts: Mark Olayon, Bernabe Teodoro 4 each
Batangas wins series, 3–1

Muntinlupa Sports Center, Muntinlupa
Referees: Geraldo Gabriel, Don Al De Dios, Rey Dillena

The Muntinlupa Cagers entered the match facing a do-or-die situation, with a 1–2 series deficit. In the early minutes of the fourth period, the Athletics led by 9 points, 57–48. However, a 10-0 run was blasted by the Cagers to regain the lead, 58–57, which all of the 10 points in the run came from Pari Llagas. Then the succeeding minutes, it was a seesaw battle where no team led more than 4 points. In the final 3.6 seconds of the game, Muntinlupa had a chance to send the game to an overtime coming off a foul from Mark Olayon. However, Llagas missed both charities that sealed the victory and the first MPBL Championship for the Batangas City Athletics.

== Broadcast notes ==
The Rajah Cup finals were aired on ABS-CBN's sports channel, ABS-CBN Sports and Action. The league aired its S+A broadcasts online via livestreaming through Facebook Live on the official MPBL page.

Game	S+A		
Game	Play-by-play	Analyst(s)	Courtside reporters
Game 1	Martin Antonio	Christian Luanzon	Gianna Llanes
Game 2	Cedelf Tupas	Jayvee Gayoso	Shiela Salaysay
Game 3	Cedelf Tupas	Christian Luanzon	Gianna Llanes
Game 4	Martin Antonio	Jayvee Gayoso	Gianna Llanes

- Additional Game 4 crew:
  - Trophy presentation and Awarding Ceremonies: Kyla Realubit
