= 2018 Parañaque Patriots season =

- Head coach: Aric del Rosario

Results
- Record: 4–5 (.444)
- Place: Overall: 7th
- Playoff finish: Semifinals (lost vs. Muntinlupa, 1–2)

Parañaque Patriots seasons

The 2018 Parañaque Patriots season was the inaugural season of the franchise in the Maharlika Pilipinas Basketball League (MPBL). Despite having a losing record in the regular season, Parañaque went on to advance to the Semifinals. The team lost to Muntinlupa in three games.

This would be the team's only appearance thus far, missing the playoffs for the next four seasons in what is tied for the longest active playoff drought in the MPBL.

== Regular season ==
=== Standings ===
Pos	Team	Pld	W	L	PCT	GB	Qualification
5	Quezon City Capitals	9	5	4	.556 (Note: Quezon City wins tiebreaker over Navotas by head-to-head victory.)	3	Playoffs
6	Navotas Clutch	9	5	4	.556	3	Playoffs
7	Parañaque Patriots	9	4	5	.444	4	Playoffs
8	Bataan Defenders	9	2	7	.222 (Note: Bataan wins tiebreaker over Imus by head-to-head victory.)	6	Playoffs
9	Imus Bandera	9	2	7	.222	6	

Source: Standings
Rules for classification: 1) Wins; 2a) If two teams are tied, head-to-head match-up; 2b) If three or more teams are tied, head-to-head point quotient; 3) overall point quotient; 4) coin toss.

=== Schedule ===
2018 Parañaque Patriots season schedule
Game	Date	Opponent	Score	Location	Record	Recap
1	January 25	Caloocan	W 70–60	Smart Araneta Coliseum	1–0	Recap
2	February 1	Muntinlupa	L 60–67	Caloocan Sports Complex	1–1	Recap
3	February 8	Bulacan	W 74–72	Valenzuela Astrodome	2–1	Recap
4	February 15	Quezon City	L 54–64	Olivarez College	2–2	Recap
5	February 22	Batangas City	L 79–87 (OT)	Batangas City Coliseum	2–3	Recap
6	March 1	Valenzuela	L 75–80	JCSGO Christian Academy	2–4	Recap
7	March 6	Bataan	W 74–71	Bataan People's Center	3–4	Recap
8	March 10	Imus	W 79–77	Olivarez College	4–4	Recap
9	March 15	Navotas	L 74–78	Valenzuela Astrodome	4–5	Recap
Source: Schedule

== Playoffs ==
=== Bracket ===
Quarterfinals (best-of-3)
1	Batangas City	2
8	Bataan	0
4	Valenzuela	2
5	Quezon City	1
2	Bulacan	1
7	Parañaque	2
3	Muntinlupa	2
6	Navotas	0

Semifinals (best-of-3)
1	Batangas City	2
4	Valenzuela	0
7	Parañaque	1
3	Muntinlupa	2

Finals (best-of-5)
1	Batangas City	3
3	Muntinlupa	1

=== Schedule ===
2018 Parañaque Patriots playoffs schedule
Round	Game	Date	Opponent	Score	Location	Series	Recap
Quarterfinals	1	March 22	Bulacan	L 73–83	Bulacan Capitol Gymnasium	1–0	Recap
Quarterfinals	2	March 27	Bulacan	W 81–54	Muntinlupa Sports Complex	1–1	Recap
Quarterfinals	3	April 3	Bulacan	W 77–70	Bulacan Capitol Gymnasium	1–2	Recap
Semifinals	1	April 5	Muntinlupa	W 84–59	Batangas City Coliseum	1–0	Recap
Semifinals	2	April 7	Muntinlupa	L 56–66	Muntinlupa Sports Complex	1–1	Recap
Semifinals	3	April 10	Muntinlupa	L 70–81	Muntinlupa Sports Complex	1–2	Recap
Source: Schedule
