= 2018 Valenzuela Classic season =

- Head coach: Chris Gavina

Results
- Record: 6–3 (.667)
- Place: Overall: 4th
- Playoff finish: Semifinals (lost vs. Batangas City, 0–2)

Valenzuela Classic seasons

The 2018 Valenzuela Classic season was the inaugural season of the franchise in the Maharlika Pilipinas Basketball League (MPBL). The team concluded the season in the Semifinals before losing to the eventual champion Batangas City Athletics in two games.

== Regular season ==
=== Standings ===
Pos	Team	Pld	W	L	PCT	GB	Qualification
2	Bulacan Kuyas	9	6	3	.667 (Note: Bulacan (1.032), Muntinlupa (1.006), Valenzuela (0.965) are ranked by head-to-head point quotient.)	2	Playoffs
3	Muntinlupa Cagers	9	6	3	.667	2	Playoffs
4	Valenzuela Classic	9	6	3	.667	2	Playoffs
5	Quezon City Capitals	9	5	4	.556 (Note: Quezon City wins tiebreaker over Navotas by head-to-head victory.)	3	Playoffs
6	Navotas Clutch	9	5	4	.556	3	Playoffs

Source: Standings
Rules for classification: 1) Wins; 2a) If two teams are tied, head-to-head match-up; 2b) If three or more teams are tied, head-to-head point quotient; 3) overall point quotient; 4) coin toss.

=== Schedule ===
2018 Valenzuela Classic season schedule
Game	Date	Opponent	Score	Location	Record	Recap
1	January 27	Batangas City	L 65–73	Muntinlupa Sports Complex	0–1	Recap
2	February 1	Caloocan	W 79–78	Caloocan Sports Complex	1–1	Recap
3	February 8	Bataan	W 97–80	Valenzuela Astrodome	2–1	Recap
4	February 15	Imus	W 81–77	Olivarez College	3–1	Recap
5	February 22	Navotas	L 77–82	Batangas City Coliseum	3–2	Recap
6	March 1	Parañaque	W 80–75	JCSGO Christian Academy	4–2	Recap
7	March 6	Muntinlupa	W 83–80	Bataan People's Center	5–2	Recap
8	March 10	Bulacan	L 83–92	Olivarez College	5–3	Recap
9	March 15	Quezon City	W 84–79	Valenzuela Astrodome	6–3	Recap
Source: Schedule

== Playoffs ==
=== Bracket ===
Quarterfinals (best-of-3)
1	Batangas City	2
8	Bataan	0
4	Valenzuela	2
5	Quezon City	1
2	Bulacan	1
7	Parañaque	2
3	Muntinlupa	2
6	Navotas	0

Semifinals (best-of-3)
1	Batangas City	2
4	Valenzuela	0
7	Parañaque	1
3	Muntinlupa	2

Finals (best-of-5)
1	Batangas City	3
3	Muntinlupa	1

=== Schedule ===
2018 Valenzuela Classic playoffs schedule
Round	Game	Date	Opponent	Score	Location	Series	Recap
Quarterfinals	1	March 20	Quezon City	W 96–89	Batangas City Coliseum	1–0	Recap
Quarterfinals	2	March 24	Quezon City	L 68–76	Valenzuela Astrodome	1–1	Recap
Quarterfinals	3	April 3	Quezon City	W 74–72	Bulacan Capitol Gymnasium	2–1	Recap
Semifinals	1	April 5	Batangas City	L 75–80	Batangas City Coliseum	0–1	Recap
Semifinals	2	April 7	Batangas City	L 64–89	Muntinlupa Sports Complex	0–2	Recap
Source: Schedule
