= 2018 Bataan Defenders season =

- Head coach: Kerwin McCoy; Jay Sierra

Results
- Record: 2–7 (.222)
- Place: Overall: 8th
- Playoff finish: Quarterfinals (lost vs. Batangas City, 0–2)

Bataan Defenders seasons

The 2018 Bataan Defenders season was the inaugural season of the franchise in the Maharlika Pilipinas Basketball League (MPBL). The team concluded their season in the Quarterfinals, after losing to the eventual champion Batangas City Athletics in two games.

== Regular season ==
=== Standings ===
Pos	Team	Pld	W	L	PCT	GB	Qualification
6	Navotas Clutch	9	5	4	.556 (Note: Quezon City wins tiebreaker over Navotas by head-to-head victory.)	3	Playoffs
7	Parañaque Patriots	9	4	5	.444	4	Playoffs
8	Bataan Defenders	9	2	7	.222 (Note: Bataan wins tiebreaker over Imus by head-to-head victory.)	6	Playoffs
9	Imus Bandera	9	2	7	.222	6	
10	Caloocan Supremos	9	1	8	.111	7	

Source: Standings
Rules for classification: 1) Wins; 2a) If two teams are tied, head-to-head match-up; 2b) If three or more teams are tied, head-to-head point quotient; 3) overall point quotient; 4) coin toss.

=== Schedule ===
2018 Bataan Defenders season schedule
Game	Date	Opponent	Score	Location	Record	Recap
1	January 30	Quezon City	L 69–87	Bulacan Capitol Gymnasium	0–1	Recap
2	February 3	Batangas City	L 73–88	Batangas City Coliseum	0–2	Recap
3	February 8	Valenzuela	L 80–97	Valenzuela Astrodome	0–3	Recap
4	February 13	Caloocan	L 69–76	Bataan People's Center	0–4	Recap
5	February 20	Imus	W 91–87	Muntinlupa Sports Complex	1–4	Recap
6	February 27	Navotas	W 96–88	Navotas Sports Complex	2–4	Recap
7	March 6	Parañaque	L 71–74	Bataan People's Center	2–5	Recap
8	March 13	Muntinlupa	L 78–87	Batangas City Coliseum	2–6	Recap
9	March 17	Bulacan	L 74–81	Bulacan Capitol Gymnasium	2–7	Recap
Source: Schedule

== Playoffs ==
=== Bracket ===
Quarterfinals (best-of-3)
1	Batangas City	2
8	Bataan	0
4	Valenzuela	2
5	Quezon City	1
2	Bulacan	1
7	Parañaque	2
3	Muntinlupa	2
6	Navotas	0

Semifinals (best-of-3)
1	Batangas City	2
4	Valenzuela	0
7	Parañaque	1
3	Muntinlupa	2

Finals (best-of-5)
1	Batangas City	3
3	Muntinlupa	1

=== Schedule ===
2018 Bataan Defenders playoffs schedule
Round	Game	Date	Opponent	Score	Location	Series	Recap
Quarterfinals	1	March 20	Batangas City	L 75–88	Batangas City Coliseum	0–1	Recap
Quarterfinals	2	March 24	Batangas City	L 82–95	Valenzuela Astrodome	0–2	Recap
Source: Schedule
