= 2018 Navotas Clutch season =

- Head coach: Elvis Tolentino

Results
- Record: 5–4 (.556)
- Place: Overall: 6th
- Playoff finish: Quarterfinals (lost vs. Muntinlupa, 0–2)

Navotas Clutch seasons

The 2018 Navotas Clutch season was the inaugural season of the franchise in the Maharlika Pilipinas Basketball League (MPBL). The team concluded their season in the Quarterfinals, after getting swept by the Muntinlupa Cagers.

== Regular season ==
=== Standings ===
Pos	Team	Pld	W	L	PCT	GB	Qualification
4	Valenzuela Classic	9	6	3	.667 (Note: Bulacan (1.032), Muntinlupa (1.006), Valenzuela (0.965) are ranked by head-to-head point quotient.)	2	Playoffs
5	Quezon City Capitals	9	5	4	.556 (Note: Quezon City wins tiebreaker over Navotas by head-to-head victory.)	3	Playoffs
6	Navotas Clutch	9	5	4	.556	3	Playoffs
7	Parañaque Patriots	9	4	5	.444	4	Playoffs
8	Bataan Defenders	9	2	7	.222 (Note: Bataan wins tiebreaker over Imus by head-to-head victory.)	6	Playoffs

Source: Standings
Rules for classification: 1) Wins; 2a) If two teams are tied, head-to-head match-up; 2b) If three or more teams are tied, head-to-head point quotient; 3) overall point quotient; 4) coin toss.

=== Schedule ===
2018 Navotas Clutch season schedule
Game	Date	Opponent	Score	Location	Record	Recap
1	January 27	Muntinlupa	W 82–76	Muntinlupa Sports Complex	1–0	Recap
2	February 3	Bulacan	W 77–76 (OT)	Batangas City Coliseum	2–0	Recap
3	February 10	Quezon City	L 78–87	Imus City Sports Complex	2–1	Recap
4	February 17	Batangas City	L 71–80	Navotas Sports Complex	2–2	Recap
5	February 22	Valenzuela	W 82–77	Batangas City Coliseum	3–2	Recap
6	February 27	Bataan	L 88–96	Navotas Sports Complex	3–3	Recap
7	March 3	Imus	L 67–70	Imus City Sports Complex	3–4	Recap
8	March 8	Caloocan	W 66–56	Caloocan Sports Complex	4–4	Recap
9	March 15	Parañaque	W 78–74	Valenzuela Astrodome	5–4	Recap
Source: Schedule

== Playoffs ==
=== Bracket ===
Quarterfinals (best-of-3)
1	Batangas City	2
8	Bataan	0
4	Valenzuela	2
5	Quezon City	1
2	Bulacan	1
7	Parañaque	2
3	Muntinlupa	2
6	Navotas	0

Semifinals (best-of-3)
1	Batangas City	2
4	Valenzuela	0
7	Parañaque	1
3	Muntinlupa	2

Finals (best-of-5)
1	Batangas City	3
3	Muntinlupa	1

=== Schedule ===
2018 Navotas Clutch playoffs schedule
Round	Game	Date	Opponent	Score	Location	Series	Recap
Quarterfinals	1	March 22	Muntinlupa	L 77–83	Bulacan Capitol Gymnasium	0–1	Recap
Quarterfinals	2	March 27	Muntinlupa	L 69–72	Muntinlupa Sports Complex	0–2	Recap
Source: Schedule
