= 2018 Bulacan Kuyas season =

- Head coach: Ogie Gumatay; Chris Baluyot

Results
- Record: 6–3 (.667)
- Place: Overall: 2nd
- Playoff finish: Quarterfinals (lost vs. Parañaque, 1–2)

Bulacan Kuyas seasons

The 2018 Bulacan Kuyas season was the inaugural season of the franchise in the Maharlika Pilipinas Basketball League (MPBL). The team concluded their season in the Quarterfinals in an upset against the Parañaque Patriots. The Kuyas lost in three games.

Despite finishing the season ranked second with a 6–3 record, Bulacan struggled in its Quarterfinal series against Parañaque. After winning game 1 at home, the team lost game 2 in a 27-point blowout. In the deciding game 3, the Kuyas would lose to the Patriots, 70–77, making them the first team in league history to lose to a lower-seeded team in the playoffs.

== Regular season ==
=== Standings ===
Pos	Team	Pld	W	L	PCT	GB	Qualification
1	Batangas City Athletics	9	8	1	.889	—	Playoffs
2	Bulacan Kuyas	9	6	3	.667 (Note: Bulacan (1.032), Muntinlupa (1.006), Valenzuela (0.965) are ranked by head-to-head point quotient.)	2	Playoffs
3	Muntinlupa Cagers	9	6	3	.667	2	Playoffs
4	Valenzuela Classic	9	6	3	.667	2	Playoffs
5	Quezon City Capitals	9	5	4	.556 (Note: Quezon City wins tiebreaker over Navotas by head-to-head victory.)	3	Playoffs

Source: Standings
Rules for classification: 1) Wins; 2a) If two teams are tied, head-to-head match-up; 2b) If three or more teams are tied, head-to-head point quotient; 3) overall point quotient; 4) coin toss.

=== Schedule ===
2018 Bulacan Kuyas season schedule
Game	Date	Opponent	Score	Location	Record	Recap
1	January 30	Imus	W 93–79	Bulacan Capitol Gymnasium	1–0	Recap
2	February 3	Navotas	L 76–77 (OT)	Batangas City Coliseum	1–1	Recap
3	February 8	Parañaque	L 72–74	Valenzuela Astrodome	1–2	Recap
4	February 13	Muntinlupa	L 71–75	Bataan People's Center	1–3	Recap
5	February 17	Caloocan	W 92–74	Navotas Sports Complex	2–3	Recap
6	February 24	Quezon City	W 95–81	Bulacan Capitol Gymnasium	3–3	Recap
7	March 3	Batangas City	W 80–72	Imus City Sports Complex	4–3	Recap
8	March 10	Valenzuela	W 92–83	Olivarez College	5–3	Recap
9	March 17	Bataan	W 81–74	Bulacan Capitol Gymnasium	6–3	Recap
Source: Schedule

== Playoffs ==
=== Bracket ===
Quarterfinals (best-of-3)
1	Batangas City	2
8	Bataan	0
4	Valenzuela	2
5	Quezon City	1
2	Bulacan	1
7	Parañaque	2
3	Muntinlupa	2
6	Navotas	0

Semifinals (best-of-3)
1	Batangas City	2
4	Valenzuela	0
7	Parañaque	1
3	Muntinlupa	2

Finals (best-of-5)
1	Batangas City	3
3	Muntinlupa	1

=== Schedule ===
2018 Bulacan Kuyas playoffs schedule
Round	Game	Date	Opponent	Score	Location	Series	Recap
Quarterfinals	1	March 22	Parañaque	W 83–73	Bulacan Capitol Gymnasium	1–0	Recap
Quarterfinals	2	March 27	Parañaque	L 54–81	Muntinlupa Sports Complex	1–1	Recap
Quarterfinals	3	April 3	Parañaque	L 70–77	Bulacan Capitol Gymnasium	1–2	Recap
Source: Schedule
