= 2018 Quezon City Capitals season =

- Head coach: Vis Valencia

Results
- Record: 5–4 (.556)
- Place: Overall: 5th
- Playoff finish: Quarterfinals (lost vs. Valenzuela, 1–2)

Quezon City Capitals seasons

The 2018 Quezon City Capitals season was the inaugural season of the franchise in the Maharlika Pilipinas Basketball League (MPBL). The team concluded their season in the Quarterfinals, losing to the Valenzuela Classic in three games.

== Regular season ==
=== Standings ===
Pos	Team	Pld	W	L	PCT	GB	Qualification
3	Muntinlupa Cagers	9	6	3	.667 (Note: Bulacan (1.032), Muntinlupa (1.006), Valenzuela (0.965) are ranked by head-to-head point quotient.)	2	Playoffs
4	Valenzuela Classic	9	6	3	.667	2	Playoffs
5	Quezon City Capitals	9	5	4	.556 (Note: Quezon City wins tiebreaker over Navotas by head-to-head victory.)	3	Playoffs
6	Navotas Clutch	9	5	4	.556	3	Playoffs
7	Parañaque Patriots	9	4	5	.444	4	Playoffs

Source: Standings
Rules for classification: 1) Wins; 2a) If two teams are tied, head-to-head match-up; 2b) If three or more teams are tied, head-to-head point quotient; 3) overall point quotient; 4) coin toss.

=== Schedule ===
2018 Quezon City Capitals season schedule
Game	Date	Opponent	Score	Location	Record	Recap
1	January 30	Bataan	W 87–69	Bulacan Capitol Gymnasium	1–0	Recap
2	February 6	Imus	W 84–75	JCSGO Christian Academy	2–0	Recap
3	February 10	Navotas	W 87–78	Imus City Sports Complex	3–0	Recap
4	February 15	Parañaque	W 64–54	Olivarez College	4–0	Recap
5	February 20	Muntinlupa	L 87–103	Muntinlupa Sports Complex	4–1	Recap
6	February 24	Bulacan	L 81–95	Bulacan Capitol Gymnasium	4–2	Recap
7	March 1	Caloocan	W 90–89	JCSGO Christian Academy	5–2	Recap
8	March 8	Batangas City	L 68–77	Caloocan Sports Complex	5–3	Recap
9	March 15	Valenzuela	L 79–84	Valenzuela Astrodome	5–4	Recap
Source: Schedule

== Playoffs ==
=== Bracket ===
Quarterfinals (best-of-3)
1	Batangas City	2
8	Bataan	0
4	Valenzuela	2
5	Quezon City	1
2	Bulacan	1
7	Parañaque	2
3	Muntinlupa	2
6	Navotas	0

Semifinals (best-of-3)
1	Batangas City	2
4	Valenzuela	0
7	Parañaque	1
3	Muntinlupa	2

Finals (best-of-5)
1	Batangas City	3
3	Muntinlupa	1

=== Schedule ===
2018 Quezon City Capitals playoffs schedule
Round	Game	Date	Opponent	Score	Location	Series	Recap
Quarterfinals	1	March 20	Valenzuela	L 89–96	Batangas City Coliseum	0–1	Recap
Quarterfinals	2	March 24	Valenzuela	W 76–68	Valenzuela Astrodome	1–1	Recap
Quarterfinals	3	April 3	Valenzuela	L 72–74	Bulacan Capitol Gymnasium	1–2	Recap
Source: Schedule
