= 2018 Muntinlupa Cagers season =

- Head coach: Aldrin Morante

Results
- Record: 6–3 (.667)
- Place: Overall: 3rd
- Playoff finish: Finals (lost vs. Batangas City, 1–3)

Muntinlupa Cagers seasons

The 2018 Muntinlupa Cagers season was the inaugural season of the franchise in the Maharlika Pilipinas Basketball League (MPBL). The team concluded their season as the season runner-up. Reaching the 2018 MPBL finals but lost to the Batangas City Athletics in four games.

== Regular season ==
=== Standings ===
| Pos | Team | Pld | W | L | PCT | GB | Qualification |
|---|---|---|---|---|---|---|---|
| 1 | Batangas City Athletics | 9 | 8 | 1 | .889 | — | Playoffs |
| 2 | Bulacan Kuyas | 9 | 6 | 3 | .667 (Note: Bulacan (1.032), Muntinlupa (1.006), Valenzuela (0.965) are ranked by head-to-head point quotient.) | 2 | Playoffs |
| 3 | Muntinlupa Cagers | 9 | 6 | 3 | .667 | 2 | Playoffs |
| 4 | Valenzuela Classic | 9 | 6 | 3 | .667 | 2 | Playoffs |
| 5 | Quezon City Capitals | 9 | 5 | 4 | .556 (Note: Quezon City wins tiebreaker over Navotas by head-to-head victory.) | 3 | Playoffs |

Source: Standings
Rules for classification: 1) Wins; 2a) If two teams are tied, head-to-head match-up; 2b) If three or more teams are tied, head-to-head point quotient; 3) overall point quotient; 4) coin toss.

=== Schedule ===
2018 Muntinlupa Cagers season schedule
| Game | Date | Opponent | Score | Location | Record | Recap |
|---|---|---|---|---|---|---|
| 1 | January 27 | Navotas | L 76–82 | Muntinlupa Sports Complex | 0–1 | Recap |
| 2 | February 1 | Parañaque | W 67–60 | Caloocan Sports Complex | 1–1 | Recap |
| 3 | February 6 | Caloocan | W 89–76 | JCSGO Christian Academy | 2–1 | Recap |
| 4 | February 13 | Bulacan | W 75–71 | Bataan People's Center | 3–1 | Recap |
| 5 | February 20 | Quezon City | W 103–87 | Muntinlupa Sports Complex | 4–1 | Recap |
| 6 | February 27 | Batangas City | L 77–82 | Navotas Sports Complex | 4–2 | Recap |
| 7 | March 6 | Valenzuela | L 80–83 | Bataan People's Center | 4–3 | Recap |
| 8 | March 13 | Bataan | W 87–78 | Batangas City Coliseum | 5–3 | Recap |
| 9 | March 17 | Imus | W 81–69 | Bulacan Capitol Gymnasium | 6–3 | Recap |
Source: Schedule

== Playoffs ==
=== Bracket ===
Quarterfinals (best-of-3)
1 | Batangas City | 2
8 | Bataan | 0
4 | Valenzuela | 2
5 | Quezon City | 1
2 | Bulacan | 1
7 | Parañaque | 2
3 | Muntinlupa | 2
6 | Navotas | 0

Semifinals (best-of-3)
1 | Batangas City | 2
4 | Valenzuela | 0
7 | Parañaque | 1
3 | Muntinlupa | 2

Finals (best-of-5)
1 | Batangas City | 3
3 | Muntinlupa | 1

=== Schedule ===
2018 Muntinlupa Cagers playoffs schedule
| Round | Game | Date | Opponent | Score | Location | Series | Recap |
|---|---|---|---|---|---|---|---|
| Quarterfinals | 1 | March 22 | Navotas | W 83–77 | Bulacan Capitol Gymnasium | 1–0 | Recap |
| Quarterfinals | 2 | March 27 | Navotas | W 72–69 | Muntinlupa Sports Complex | 2–0 | Recap |
| Semifinals | 1 | April 5 | Parañaque | L 59–84 | Batangas City Coliseum | 0–1 | Recap |
| Semifinals | 2 | April 7 | Parañaque | W 66–56 | Muntinlupa Sports Complex | 1–1 | Recap |
| Semifinals | 3 | April 10 | Parañaque | W 81–70 | Muntinlupa Sports Complex | 2–1 | Recap |
| Finals | 1 | April 12 | Batangas City | L 64–70 | Batangas City Coliseum | 0–1 | Recap |
| Finals | 2 | April 14 | Batangas City | L 74–78 | Batangas City Coliseum | 0–2 | Recap |
| Finals | 3 | April 17 | Batangas City | W 82–77 | Muntinlupa Sports Complex | 1–2 | Recap |
| Finals | 4 | April 19 | Batangas City | L 66–68 | Muntinlupa Sports Complex | 1–3 | Recap |
Source: Schedule
