= 2018 Batangas City Athletics season =

- MPBL champions
- Head coach: Mac Tan

Results
- Record: 8–1 (.889)
- Place: Overall: 1st
- Playoff finish: MPBL champions (won vs. Muntinlupa, 3–1)

Batangas City Athletics seasons

The 2018 Batangas City Athletics season was the inaugural season of the franchise in the Maharlika Pilipinas Basketball League (MPBL). The team concluded their season as the league's inaugural champions, after defeating the Muntinlupa Cagers in four games during the 2018 MPBL finals.

Led by Val Acuña, Batangas City finished with the league's best record, winning eight out of nine games. The only loss came against the Bulacan Kuyas on March 3, 2018. The Athletics then swept its playoff opponents in the quarterfinals and semifinals before meeting Muntinlupa in the inaugural finals series. After winning the first two games at home, they lost the following game 3 as the visiting team. On April 19, 2018, the Athletics would beat the Cagers by two points, claiming their first and only MPBL championship.

== Regular season ==
=== Standings ===
Pos	Team	Pld	W	L	PCT	GB	Qualification
1	Batangas City Athletics	9	8	1	.889	—	Playoffs
2	Bulacan Kuyas	9	6	3	.667 (Note: Bulacan (1.032), Muntinlupa (1.006), Valenzuela (0.965) are ranked by head-to-head point quotient.)	2	Playoffs
3	Muntinlupa Cagers	9	6	3	.667	2	Playoffs
4	Valenzuela Classic	9	6	3	.667	2	Playoffs
5	Quezon City Capitals	9	5	4	.556 (Note: Quezon City wins tiebreaker over Navotas by head-to-head victory.)	3	Playoffs

Source: Standings
Rules for classification: 1) Wins; 2a) If two teams are tied, head-to-head match-up; 2b) If three or more teams are tied, head-to-head point quotient; 3) overall point quotient; 4) coin toss.

=== Schedule ===
2018 Batangas City Athletics season schedule
Game	Date	Opponent	Score	Location	Record	Recap
1	January 27	Valenzuela	W 73–65	Muntinlupa Sports Complex	1–0	Recap
2	February 3	Bataan	W 88–73	Batangas City Coliseum	2–0	Recap
3	February 10	Imus	W 74–56	Imus City Sports Complex	3–0	Recap
4	February 17	Navotas	W 80–71	Navotas Sports Complex	4–0	Recap
5	February 22	Parañaque	W 87–79 (OT)	Batangas City Coliseum	5–0	Recap
6	February 27	Muntinlupa	W 82–77	Navotas Sports Complex	6–0	Recap
7	March 3	Bulacan	L 72–80	Imus City Sports Complex	6–1	Recap
8	March 8	Quezon City	W 77–68	Caloocan Sports Complex	7–1	Recap
9	March 13	Caloocan	W 86–75	Batangas City Coliseum	8–1	Recap
Source: Schedule

== Playoffs ==
=== Bracket ===
Quarterfinals (best-of-3)
1	Batangas City	2
8	Bataan	0
4	Valenzuela	2
5	Quezon City	1
2	Bulacan	1
7	Parañaque	2
3	Muntinlupa	2
6	Navotas	0

Semifinals (best-of-3)
1	Batangas City	2
4	Valenzuela	0
7	Parañaque	1
3	Muntinlupa	2

Finals (best-of-5)
1	Batangas City	3
3	Muntinlupa	1

=== Schedule ===
2018 Batangas City Athletics playoffs schedule
Round	Game	Date	Opponent	Score	Location	Series	Recap
Quarterfinals	1	March 20	Bataan	W 88–75	Batangas City Coliseum	1–0	Recap
Quarterfinals	2	March 24	Bataan	W 95–82	Valenzuela Astrodome	2–0	Recap
Semifinals	1	April 5	Valenzuela	W 80–75	Batangas City Coliseum	1–0	Recap
Semifinals	2	April 7	Valenzuela	W 89–64	Muntinlupa Sports Complex	2–0	Recap
Finals	1	April 12	Muntinlupa	W 70–64	Batangas City Coliseum	1–0	Recap
Finals	2	April 14	Muntinlupa	W 78–74	Batangas City Coliseum	2–0	Recap
Finals	3	April 17	Muntinlupa	L 77–82	Muntinlupa Sports Complex	2–1	Recap
Finals	4	April 19	Muntinlupa	W 68–66	Muntinlupa Sports Complex	3–1	Recap
Source: Schedule
