= Chito Jaime =

Filipino basketball player (born 1983)

No. 28 – Bataan Risers
- Position: Power forward
- League: MPBL

Personal information
- Born: October 21, 1983 (age 43) Balanga, Bataan, Philippines
- Listed height: 6 ft 4 in (1.93 m)
- Listed weight: 200 lb (91 kg)

Career information
- College: Colegio de San Lorenzo; AMA Computer University
- PBA draft: 2008: 2nd round, 14th overall pick
- Drafted by: Sta. Lucia Realtors
- Playing career: 2008–present

Career history
- 2008–2010: Sta. Lucia Realtors
- 2010–2011: AirAsia Philippine Patriots
- 2011: Ilocos Sur CS Tigers (Liga Pilipinas)
- 2011–2013: Rain or Shine Elasto Painters
- 2013–2014: Air21 Express
- 2014–2017: Kia Picanto
- 2018–2019: Muntinlupa Cagers
- 2019–2020: Bataan Risers
- 2021: Iloilo United Royals
- 2022–2023: Zamboanga Family's Brand Sardines
- 2023: Bacoor City Strikers
- 2024: Zamboanga Master Sardines
- 2024: GenSan Warriors
- 2025: Pasig City
- 2026–present: Bataan Risers

Career highlights
- PBA champion (2012 Governors'); PBL Most Improved Player (2007–08); NAASCU champion (2006); NAASCU MVP (2006)

Chito Montemayor Jaime (born October 21, 1983) is a Filipino professional basketball player for Bataan Risers of the Maharlika Pilipinas Basketball League (MPBL). He also previously played in the Philippine Basketball Association (PBA).

== College career ==
Jaime first played for the Colegio De San Lorenzo Griffins in the National Capital Region Athletic Association (NCRAA). In 2005, he helped lead them to the NCRAA finals against the EAC Generals. In the title game, he had 19 points and what could have been the game-winning score with 27 minutes remaining, but the team committed a dribbling violation, sending the game into overtime. From there Ronjay Buenafe and Nino Songco put the title out of reach for CDSL.

Jaime then played for the AMA Titans in the National Athletic Association of Schools, Colleges and Universities (NAASCU). He also led them to the NAASCU finals in 2006. In the championship-clinching game, he was limited to five points, but his teammates stepped up to get AMA the NAASCU title. For the season, Jaime was awarded MVP, a spot on the Mythical Team, and was the top rebounder in the league.

== Professional career ==
=== Sta. Lucia Realtors (2008–10) ===
Jaime was drafted 14th overall by the Sta. Lucia Realtors in the 2008 PBA draft.

=== AirAsia Philippine Patriots (2010–11) ===
In 2010, Jaime joined the AirAsia Philippine Patriots in the ASEAN Basketball League (ABL). That season, the Patriots reached the finals.

=== Ilocos Sur CS Tigers (2011) ===
Jaime then played for the Ilocos Sur CS Tigers in the Liga Pilipinas.

=== Rain or Shine Elasto Painters (2011–13) ===
Jaime was on the Rain or Shine Elasto Painters team that won its first championship during the 2012 Governors' Cup.

=== Air21 Express (2013–14) ===
Jaime then found himself in a bench role for the Air21 Express.

=== Kia Picanto (2014–17) ===
In 2014, Jaime was placed into the dispersal draft. The Kia Picanto were able to select him, and he made the opening night roster. In a 2016 Commissioner's Cup win over the NLEX Road Warriors, he had PBA career-highs of 15 points and 11 rebounds. This was his first double-double in the league. In the 2016 offseason, he and Bradwyn Guinto were dealt to NLEX for Rob Reyes, Jeckster Apinan, and Reden Celda. He did not play for NLEX. By the 2017 Governors' Cup, he was back with Kia. He scored 13 points in a loss to NLEX that conference.

=== Muntinlupa Cagers (2018–19) ===
Jaime then spent time in the semi-pro Marikina City Basketball League in 2017. He debuted at the Maharlika Pilipinas Basketball League with the Muntinlupa Cagers in February 2018. With Muntinlupa, he had a bigger role, averaging 15.6 points and 7.9 rebounds per game. He scored a team-high 19 points in a win over the Navotas Clutch. In Game 3 of the semis, he scored 22 points to lead Muntinlupa to the 2018 finals. There, they lost to the Batangas City Athletics 3–1.

Jaime returned for the Datu Cup, scoring 17 points in a win over the Mandaluyong El Tigre. He helped lead them to an eight-game winning streak to start the season. In a win over the Pasay Voyagers, he and Allan Mangahas became the league's first members of the MPBL's 500 points club.

=== Bataan Risers (2019–20) ===
In February 2019, Jaime took his talents to the 3x3 scene and played for his native Bataan Risers in the Chooks-to-Go Pilipinas 3x3. He helped the team win the third leg of the President's Cup.

Jaime then returned to playing 5-on-5 basketball for Bataan's MPBL team. He scored 13 points in a loss to the Valenzuela Classic as they started the season 1–1. Against the Manila Stars, he scored the game-winning post shot and boosted the team's record to 16–9. They went on to win three straight games from there. In the semis, they lost to the Pampanga Giant Lanterns.

=== Iloilo United Royals (2021) ===
In 2021, Jaime played in the regional Pilipinas VisMin Super Cup for the Roxas Vanguards. He also played for Batangas City in the 2021 FilBasket Subic Championship. In November 2021, he joined the Iloilo United Royals for the 2021 MPBL Invitational. They opened the tournament with a win over the Negros Muscovados, with him scoring 18 points on 7-of-13 shooting from the field. He then scored a tournament-high 28 points in a win over the All-Star Bacolod Ballers. In a win over the Bacoor City Strikers, he had 16 points and 12 rebounds. Iloilo was eliminated in the quarterfinals by the Nueva Ecija Rice Vanguards.

=== Zamboanga Family's Brand Sardines (2022–23) ===
Jaime then played for the Zamboanga Family's Brand Sardines, beginning in the 2022 Filbasket Summer Championship. He also played for them in the MPBL, helping them reach the 2022 MPBL finals.

=== Bacoor City Strikers (2023) ===
In 2023, Jaime played for the Bacoor City Strikers. With Bacoor, he became the 15th player to reach the 1,000 points milestone. In a win over Bacolod, he scored 12 of his 15 points in the third quarter. In a loss to Zamboanga, he had 20 points and made six three-pointers. Once again, his team made the MPBL finals, but this time lost to Pampanga.

=== Return to Zamboanga (2024–present) ===
For the 2024 MPBL season, Jaime returned to Zamboanga's team. Against the Biñan Tatak Gel, he scored the game-winning basket as he helped his team overcome a 10-point deficit in the last two minutes of the game. They were eliminated in the North division quarterfinals by the Parañaque Patriots.

== Player profile ==
Jaime combines strength and power and a nose for the ball. He can also shoot from long range and plays the forward positions. A fast break finisher and back court defender, Jaime is competitive and plays offensively and defensively. During his college tenure with the AMA Titans, he averaged a near 20-10 (points and rebounds).

== PBA career statistics ==
Legend
GP	Games played	MPG	Minutes per game
FG%	Field-goal percentage	3P%	3-point field-goal percentage	FT%	Free-throw percentage
RPG	Rebounds per game	APG	Assists per game	SPG	Steals per game
BPG	Blocks per game	PPG	Points per game	**Bold**	Career high

Correct as of September 22, 2017

=== Season-by-season averages ===
Year	Team	GP	MPG	FG%	3P%	FT%	RPG	APG	SPG	BPG	PPG
2008–09	Sta. Lucia	15	4.3	.353	.250	.400	.5	.1	.0	.0	1.1
2009–10	Sta. Lucia	8	6.1	.294	.000	.833	.9	.0	.1	.0	1.9
2011–12	Rain or Shine	13	6.1	.364	.250	.667	1.1	.5	.2	.0	1.5
2012–13	Rain or Shine	16	7.1	.128	.087	.500	1.4	.3	**.3**	.0	1.1
2013–14	Air21	18	7.1	.343	.167	.714	1.6	.2	.1	.0	2.1
2014–15	Kia	4	**13.5**	**.400**	.222	.250	**2.8**	**.8**	**.3**	.0	**5.8**
2015–16	Mahindra	**23**	10.2	.340	**.302**	.522	2.4	.2	.2	.0	3.9
2016–17	Kia	10	7.8	.238	.211	**.875**	2.2	.4	.1	.3	3.1
Career		107	7.8	.308	.186	.595	1.4	.3	.1	.0	2.6

== Personal life ==
Jaime is married and has a daughter.
