= Lester Alvarez =

Filipino basketball player

Personal information
- Born: September 18, 1988 (age 38)
- Listed height: 5 ft 9 in (1.75 m)
- Listed weight: 154 lb (70 kg)

Career information
- High school: Letran (Manila)
- College: Adamson
- PBA draft: 2012: 2nd round, 15th overall pick
- Drafted by: Barako Bull Energy Cola
- Playing career: 2012–2025
- Position: Point guard
- Coaching career: 2022–present

Career history

Playing
- 2012–2013: Barako Bull Energy Cola
- 2013–2015: San Mig Super Coffee Mixers / Star Hotshots
- 2016–2017: Thai General Equipment
- 2017: Kabayan Pilipinas
- 2018–2019: Batangas City Athletics
- 2019–2020: Bulacan Kuyas
- 2021: MJAS Zenith–Talisay Aquastars
- 2021–2022: Valenzuela MJAS Zenith / XUR Homes Realty Inc.
- 2024–2025: Chichi Albayanos Wild Catz
- 2025: Val City Magic

Coaching
- 2022: Valenzuela XUR Homes Realty Inc.
- 2025–2026: Titan Ultra Giant Risers (assistant)

Career highlights
- 2× PBA Champion (2013 Governors', 2013–14 PBA Philippine); MPBL champion (2018 Rajah); MPBL Three-Point Shootout winner (2020); PCCL Mythical Team (2010)

Lester Andrew F. Alvarez (born September 18, 1988) is a Filipino professional coach and basketball player. He served as the assistant coach for the Titan Ultra Giant Risers of the Philippine Basketball Association (PBA). Alvarez played college basketball for the Adamson Soaring Falcons. In UAAP Seasons 73 and 74, he was one of the key pieces to the Falcons squad alongside Alex Nuyles and Jerick Cañada, as they led the Falcons back to relevance in the UAAP.

Alvarez was drafted 15th overall by the Barako Bull Energy Cola. Although he played limited minutes, he was still able to win two PBA titles before playing in the MPBL.

== High school and college career ==
Alvarez played for the Letran Squires in high school. In 2005, Letran made the NCAA Final Four. However, Alvarez had played in an inter-city league while the Final Four was ongoing. As a result, they were disqualified from the rest of the tournament.

Alvarez then joined the Adamson Soaring Falcons in 2007. He spent two weeks on their Team B before he was promoted to Adamson's main roster.

In UAAP Season 73, against the Ateneo Blue Eagles, Alvarez suffered a bloodied nose when Eric Salamat swiped at him to steal the ball. In a rematch against them, he scored 22 points, but missed a potential game-tying triple. That season, with coach Leo Austria at the helm, Alvarez, Alex Nuyles, and team captain Jerick Cañada were able to lead Adamson to its first Final Four in four years. Adamson and Ateneo then faced each other in the Final Four with Adamson as the 3rd seed and Ateneo as the 2nd seed. Ateneo won 68–55 to send Adamson home and eventually win the UAAP title for a third straight year.

In the offseason, Adamson competed in the PCCL. They lost to Ateneo in the finals, but Alvarez and teammate Alex Nuyles were named to the PCCL Mythical Team. UAAP Season 74 was Alvarez's last season in college. Adamson began their season with another loss to Ateneo in which Alvarez's layup was blocked in the clutch. In a win over the UE Red Warriors, he led the team with 16 points. In a rematch against Ateneo, he contributed 14 points as the Falcons snapped a 13-year losing streak against Ateneo to deny them of a step-ladder Final Four and a sweep of the elimination rounds. In the Final Four, they faced the FEU Tamaraws, who prevented them from reaching the finals.

== Professional career ==
Alvarez applied for the 2012 PBA draft. There, he was picked 15th overall in the second round by the Barako Bull Energy Cola. He made his debut against the Petron Blaze Boosters.

In January 2013, Alvarez was traded from Barako Bull to San Mig Super Coffee Mixers. The trade was a part of a 5-team, 10-player trade that also involved Barako Bull, San Mig Coffee, Petron Blaze, Barangay Ginebra San Miguel, and Alaska. He was placed on the reserve list for the 2013–14 season. At the end of the season, he was among four players San Mig left unprotected during the 2014 expansion draft, but was allowed to return to the team once no team signed him. He was again inserted on the active roster after an injury sustained by Ian Sangalang, during the 2014–15 PBA season.

In 2015, Alvarez was released by the Hotshots, but was signed by Euro Med Laboratories of the Pilipinas Commercial Basketball League.

In June 2016, Alvarez was signed by Thai General Equipment of the Thailand Basketball League as an import.

After his stint in Thailand, Alvarez returned home and signed with the PBA D-League team Tanduay Light Rhum Masters, joining Mark Cruz in their backcourt for the 2017 PBA D-League Aspirants’ Cup playoffs. He was able to lead them to the semifinals before they eventually fell to the Cignal HD - San Beda Hawkeyes. He also played for Tanduay in the D-League Foundation Cup, where they were eliminated in the quarterfinals.

In February 2018, Alvarez and former Star Hotshots teammate Val Acuña joined the Batangas City Athletics in the Maharlika Pilipinas Basketball League (MPBL). They helped lead the team to become the inaugural MPBL champions. In the MPBL's third season, Alvarez was named the team's captain. He was two rebounds shy of a triple-double in a win over the Quezon City Capitals.

During the 2019–20 season, Alvarez transferred to the Bulacan Kuyas. During All-Star Weekend, he won the Three-Point Shootout contest with 24 points in the final round.

In 2021, Alvarez joined the MJAS Zenith–Talisay Aquastars that competed in the Pilipinas VisMin Super Cup.

== Coaching career ==
In 2025, it was announced that Alvarez would be one of the assistant coaches for the Titan Ultra Giant Risers.

== Career statistics ==
=== PBA ===
Legend
GP	Games played	MPG	Minutes per game
FG%	Field-goal percentage	3P%	3-point field-goal percentage	FT%	Free-throw percentage
RPG	Rebounds per game	APG	Assists per game	SPG	Steals per game
BPG	Blocks per game	PPG	Points per game	**Bold**	Career high

==== Season-by-season averages ====
Year	Team	GP	MPG	FG%	3P%	FT%	RPG	APG	SPG	BPG	PPG
2012–13	Barako Bull	**19**	**7.0**	**.324**	**.375**	**.500**	**.8**	**.4**	**.2**	.0	**1.8**
2012–13	San Mig Coffee	**19**	**7.0**	**.324**	**.375**	**.500**	**.8**	**.4**	**.2**	.0	**1.8**
2013–14	San Mig Super Coffee	1	3.0	—	—	—	.0	.0	.0	.0	.0
2014–15	Purefoods / Star	7	3.9	.250	.333	—	.4	.0	.0	.0	.9
2015–16	Star	1	1.0	—	—	—	.0	.0	.0	.0	.0
Career		28	5.8	.310	.367	.500	.7	.3	.2	.0	1.5

=== MPBL ===
Legend
GP	Games played	GS	Games started	MPG	Minutes per game
FG%	Field-goal percentage	3P%	3-point field-goal percentage	FT%	Free-throw percentage
RPG	Rebounds per game	APG	Assists per game	SPG	Steals per game
BPG	Blocks per game	PPG	Points per game	**Bold**	Career high

==== Season-by-season averages ====
Year	Team	GP	GS	MPG	FG%	3P%	FT%	RPG	APG	SPG	BPG	PPG
2018	Batangas City	17	17	21.9	**.366**	.258	.741	2.8	4.0	**1.1**	.1	9.2
2018–19	Batangas City	**33**	**23**	21.6	.309	.316	.761	**3.7**	3.3	1.0	.0	7.7
2019–20	Batangas City	10	9	**24.1**	.359	**.396**	.794	3.6	**4.6**	.5	**.2**	**10.2**
2019–20	Bulacan	17	15	22.1	.324	.310	.840	2.4	3.2	**1.1**	.0	8.2
2022	Valenzuela	12	4	14.7	.172	.157	**.867**	1.8	1.9	.8	.0	3.6
