= Rey Publico =

Filipino basketball player

No. 31 – Quezon City Black Bulls
- Position: Power forward
- League: MPBL

Personal information
- Born: November 29, 1992 (age 33) Batangas City, Batangas, Philippines
- Listed height: 6 ft 4 in (1.93 m)
- Listed weight: 201 lb (91 kg)

Career information
- College: Letran
- PBA draft: 2019: 2nd round, 16th overall pick
- Drafted by: Alaska Aces
- Playing career: 2018–present

Career history
- 2018–2019: Navotas Clutch
- 2019–2020: Iloilo United Royals
- 2020–2022: Alaska Aces
- 2022: Blackwater Bossing
- 2024: Zamboanga Master Sardines
- 2025: Basilan Viva Portmasters
- 2026–present: Quezon City Black Bulls

Career highlights
- NCAA Philippines champion (2015)

Reynaldo Jacinto Publico Jr. (born November 29, 1992) is a Filipino basketball player for the Quezon City Black Bulls of the Maharlika Pilipinas Basketball League (MPBL). He was drafted 4th in the 2nd round of the 2019 PBA draft.

== Professional career ==
Publico was drafted by the Alaska Aces in the 2nd round (4th) of the 2019 PBA draft.

On May 23, 2022, he signed one-year deal with the Blackwater Bossing.

== PBA career statistics ==
Legend
GP	Games played	MPG	Minutes per game
FG%	Field-goal percentage	3P%	3-point field-goal percentage	FT%	Free-throw percentage
RPG	Rebounds per game	APG	Assists per game	SPG	Steals per game
BPG	Blocks per game	PPG	Points per game	**Bold**	Career high

As of the end of 2022–23 season

=== Season-by-season averages ===
Year	Team	GP	MPG	FG%	3P%	FT%	RPG	APG	SPG	BPG	PPG
2020	Alaska	7	6.2	.250	.200	.750	1.0	.0	.0	.0	1.4
2021	Alaska	7	4.5	.100	.000	**1.000**	.7	.1	.0	.0	.6
2022–23	Blackwater	**12**	**8.4**	**.357**	**.220**	.750	**1.4**	**.3**	**.1**	**.2**	**2.3**
Career		26	6.8	.280	.150	.786	1.1	.2	.0	.1	1.6
