= 2018 Imus Bandera season =

- Head coach: Nandy Garcia; Jerry Codiñera

Results
- Record: 2–7 (.222)
- Place: Overall: 9th

Imus Bandera seasons

The 2018 Imus Bandera season was the inaugural season of the franchise in the Maharlika Pilipinas Basketball League (MPBL). The team finished the season with a 2–7 record, tied with the Bataan Defenders. Imus would miss the playoffs by head-to-head defeat against Bataan.

== Regular season ==
=== Standings ===
Pos	Team	Pld	W	L	PCT	GB	Qualification
6	Navotas Clutch	9	5	4	.556 (Note: Quezon City wins tiebreaker over Navotas by head-to-head victory.)	3	Playoffs
7	Parañaque Patriots	9	4	5	.444	4	Playoffs
8	Bataan Defenders	9	2	7	.222 (Note: Bataan wins tiebreaker over Imus by head-to-head victory.)	6	Playoffs
9	Imus Bandera	9	2	7	.222	6	
10	Caloocan Supremos	9	1	8	.111	7	

Source: Standings
Rules for classification: 1) Wins; 2a) If two teams are tied, head-to-head match-up; 2b) If three or more teams are tied, head-to-head point quotient; 3) overall point quotient; 4) coin toss.

=== Schedule ===
2018 Imus Bandera season schedule
Game	Date	Opponent	Score	Location	Record	Recap
1	January 30	Bulacan	L 79–93	Bulacan Capitol Gymnasium	0–1	Recap
2	February 6	Quezon City	L 75–84	JCSGO Christian Academy	0–2	Recap
3	February 10	Batangas City	L 56–74	Imus City Sports Complex	0–3	Recap
4	February 15	Valenzuela	L 77–81	Olivarez College	0–4	Recap
5	February 20	Bataan	L 87–91	Muntinlupa Sports Complex	0–5	Recap
6	February 24	Caloocan	W 70–61	Bulacan Capitol Gymnasium	1–5	Recap
7	March 3	Navotas	W 70–67	Imus City Sports Complex	2–5	Recap
8	March 10	Parañaque	L 77–79	Olivarez College	2–6	Recap
9	March 17	Muntinlupa	L 69–81	Bulacan Capitol Gymnasium	2–7	Recap
Source: Schedule
