= Martin Antonio =

Ghanaian biologist and researcher

- Education: Queen Mary University of London
- Scientific career
- Workplaces: Warwick Medical School
- Thesis: Molecular biological studies on Staphylococcus aureus (1997)

Martin Antonio is a Ghanaian biologist who is Principal Investigator at the Medical Research Council Unit (The Gambia) at London School of Hygiene and Tropical Medicine. He is Director of the World Health Organization Centre for New Vaccines Surveillance and leads the West and Central Africa Regional Reference Laboratory for Invasive Bacterial Diseases.

== Early life and education ==
Antonio is from Ghana. He moved to Queen Mary University of London for his doctoral research, where he studied Staphylococcus aureus. He moved to the University of Birmingham as a research fellow in 2001.

== Research and career ==
Antonio joined the Medical Research Council (the Gambia, MRCG) in 2005, where he set up the molecular biology research group. His research develops molecular diagnostics for tropical infections. He has led several multi-national research projects to better understand the causes and prevalence of pneumonia and diarrhoea. His research group developed large disease surveillance platforms across Africa, and became the World Health Organization Reference Laboratory for Pneumococcal Disease.

In 2016, Antonio started working with the WHO on an outbreak of meningitis in Ghana. He leveraged the Medical Research Council (the Gambia) to identify the causative pathogens. In 2020 he was elected Fellow of the African Academy of Sciences.

== Selected publications ==
- Catherine Satzke; Turner, Paul; Anni Virolainen-Julkunen; et al. (2013). "Standard method for detecting upper respiratory carriage of Streptococcus pneumoniae: updated recommendations from the World Health Organization Pneumococcal Carriage Working Group". Vaccine. 32 (1): 165–179. doi:10.1016/j.vaccine.2013.08.062. PMID 24331112. Wikidata Q38170603.
- F. Gibson; J. Walsh; P. Mburu; A. Varela; K. A. Brown; Antonio, Martin; K. W. Beisel; K. P. Steel; S. D. Brown (1995). "A type VII myosin encoded by the mouse deafness gene shaker-1". Nature. 374 (6517): 62–64. doi:10.1038/374062a0. PMID 7870172. Wikidata Q28512902.
- de Jong, Bouke C; Antonio, Martin; Gagneux, Sebastien (2010). "Mycobacterium africanum--review of an important cause of human tuberculosis in West Africa". PLoS Neglected Tropical Diseases. 4 (9): e744. doi:10.1371/journal.pntd.0000744. PMC 2946903. PMID 20927191. Wikidata Q21144526.
