= 2018 MPBL season =

Inaugural season of the Maharlika Pilipinas Basketball League

- League: Maharlika Pilipinas Basketball League
- Sport: Basketball
- Duration: Regular season: January 25 – March 17, 2018; Playoffs: March 20 – April 10, 2018; Finals: April 12–19, 2018
- Games: 45 (regular season); 19 (playoffs)
- Teams: 10
- TV partner: ABS-CBN Sports (S+A)

Regular season
- Top seed: Batangas City Athletics

Playoffs

Finals
- Champions: Batangas City Athletics
- Runners-up: Muntinlupa Cagers
- Finals MVP: Val Acuña (Batangas City)

MPBL seasons
- 2018–19 →

The 2018 MPBL season, also known as the MPBL Rajah Cup or the MPBL Anta–Rajah Cup for sponsorship reasons, was the inaugural season of the Maharlika Pilipinas Basketball League. The regular season began on January 25, 2018 with the opening ceremonies at the Smart Araneta Coliseum in Quezon City, and ended on March 17. The playoffs began on March 20 and ended on April 19 when the Batangas City Athletics defeated the Muntinlupa Cagers in four games in the 2018 MPBL finals.

The inaugural season featured ten teams, all based in Luzon, making it the only season to not have divisions nor feature teams from Visayas or Mindanao. It is also, to date, the smallest season in terms of size.

== Teams ==
The inaugural season featured ten teams, all based in Luzon, with no division alignment.

=== Arenas ===
Team	Arena	Capacity
Bataan Defenders	Bataan People's Center	4,000
Batangas City Athletics	Batangas City Sports Coliseum	4,000
Bulacan Kuyas	Bulacan Capitol Gymnasium	5,000
Caloocan Supremos	Caloocan Sports Complex	3,000
Imus Bandera	Imus City Sports Complex	1,000
Muntinlupa Cagers	Muntinlupa Sports Center	3,000
Navotas Clutch	Navotas Sports Complex	1,000
Parañaque Patriots	Olivarez College Gymnasium	3,500
Quezon City Capitals	JCSGO Seed Dome	1,000
Valenzuela Classic	Valenzuela Astrodome	3,000
Opening ceremonies	Smart Araneta Coliseum	25,000

=== Roster regulations ===
Since the MPBL was a semi-professional league at the time, its initial set of roster regulations are made to help promote local talents:

- Teams are required to sign three homegrown players into the roster. These players must be native to the locality in which the team is based in.
- A limit of five ex-professional (or ex-pro) players is placed on each team. Any player who has had experience in professional basketball is considered an ex-professional player.

== Regular season ==
=== Opening ceremony ===
The regular season began on January 25, 2018 with the opening ceremony at the Smart Araneta Coliseum in Quezon City. It featured the inaugural game which saw the Parañaque Patriots beating the Caloocan Supremos with a score of 70–60. Daniel San Juan de Guzman of the Parañaque Patriots made the league's first basket in that game.

=== Format ===
The ten teams played in a single round-robin format, playing one game against all other teams in the league. In each gameday, a series of games is played in a designated home arena, with the home team usually playing in the final game.

The top eight teams overall advanced to a three-round, single-elimination playoffs, playing in best-of-three series in the quarterfinals and semifinals, and a best-of-five series in the finals, with homecourt advantage alternating between the higher seeds of each series (excluding the finals).

=== Standings ===
Pos	Team	Pld	W	L	PCT	GB	Qualification
1	Batangas City Athletics	9	8	1	.889	—	Playoffs
2	Bulacan Kuyas	9	6	3	.667 (Note: Bulacan (1.032), Muntinlupa (1.006), Valenzuela (0.965) are ranked by head-to-head point quotient.)	2	Playoffs
3	Muntinlupa Cagers	9	6	3	.667	2	Playoffs
4	Valenzuela Classic	9	6	3	.667	2	Playoffs
5	Quezon City Capitals	9	5	4	.556 (Note: Quezon City wins tiebreaker over Navotas by head-to-head victory.)	3	Playoffs
6	Navotas Clutch	9	5	4	.556	3	Playoffs
7	Parañaque Patriots	9	4	5	.444	4	Playoffs
8	Bataan Defenders	9	2	7	.222 (Note: Bataan wins tiebreaker over Imus by head-to-head victory.)	6	Playoffs
9	Imus Bandera	9	2	7	.222	6	
10	Caloocan Supremos	9	1	8	.111	7	

Source: Standings
Rules for classification: 1) Wins; 2a) If two teams are tied, head-to-head match-up; 2b) If three or more teams are tied, head-to-head point quotient; 3) overall point quotient; 4) coin toss.

=== Schedule ===
Bold indicates home game; Italics indicate away game

Team ╲ Game	1	2	3	4	5	6	7	8	9
Bataan	QC	BTG	VAL	**CAL**	IMS	NAV	**PAR**	MUN	BUL
Batangas	VAL	**BAN**	IMS	NAV	**PAR**	MUN	BUL	QC	**CAL**
Bulacan	**IMS**	NAV	PAR	MUN	CAL	**QC**	BTG	VAL	**BAN**
Caloocan	PAR	**VAL**	MUN	BAN	BUL	IMS	QC	**NAV**	BTG
Imus	BUL	QC	**BTG**	VAL	BAN	CAL	**NAV**	PAR	MUN
Muntinlupa	**NAV**	PAR	CAL	BUL	**QC**	BTG	VAL	BAN	IMS
Navotas	MUN	BUL	QC	**BTG**	VAL	**BAN**	IMS	CAL	PAR
Parañaque	CAL	MUN	BUL	**QC**	BTG	VAL	BAN	**IMS**	NAV
Quezon City	BAN	**IMS**	NAV	PAR	MUN	BUL	**CAL**	BTG	VAL
Valenzuela	BTG	CAL	**BAN**	IMS	NAV	PAR	MUN	BUL	**QC**

Source: Schedule
= Win; = OT win; = Loss; = OT loss

=== Results ===
Team	BAN	BTG	BUL	CAL	IMS	MUN	NAV	PAR	QC	VAL
Bataan		73–88	74–81	69–76	91–87	78–87	96–88	71–74	69–87	80–97
Batangas			72–80	86–75	74–56	82–77	80–71	87–79*	77–68	73–65
Bulacan				92–74	93–79	71–75	76–77*	72–74	95–81	92–83
Caloocan					61–70	76–89	56–66	60–70	89–90	78–79
Imus						69–81	70–67	77–78	75–84	77–81
Muntinlupa							76–82	67–60	103–87	80–83
Navotas								78–74	78–87	82–77
Parañaque									54–64	75–80
Quezon City										79–84
Valenzuela										

Source: Schedule
Legend: Blue = left column team win; Red = top row team win.
Matches with lighter background shading were decided after overtime.

Not all games are in home–away format. Each team plays every team once. Number of asterisks after each score denotes number of overtimes played.

== Playoffs ==
Teams in bold advanced to the next round. The numbers to the left of each team indicate the team's seeding in its division, and the numbers to the right indicate the number of games the team won in that round. Teams with home court advantage, the higher seeded team, are shown in italics.

Quarterfinals (best-of-3)
1	**Batangas City**	**2**
8	Bataan	0
4	**Valenzuela**	**2**
5	Quezon City	1
2	Bulacan	1
7	**Parañaque**	**2**
3	**Muntinlupa**	**2**
6	Navotas	0

Semifinals (best-of-3)
1	**Batangas City**	**2**
4	Valenzuela	0
7	Parañaque	1
3	**Muntinlupa**	**2**

Finals (best-of-5)
1	**Batangas City**	**3**
3	Muntinlupa	1

=== Quarterfinals ===
In the quarterfinals, the first- and second-seeded teams host games 1 and 3, while the third- and fourth-seeded teams host game 2.

Team 1	Series	Team 2	Game 1	Game 2	Game 3
**(1) Batangas City Athletics**	2–0	(8) Bataan Defenders	**88**–75	**95**–82	—
(2) Bulacan Kuyas	1–2	**(7) Parañaque Patriots**	**83**–73	54–**81**	70–**77**
**(3) Muntinlupa Cagers**	2–0	(6) Navotas Clutch	**83**–77	**72**–69	—
**(4) Valenzuela Classic**	2–1	(5) Quezon City Capitals	**96**–89	68–**76**	**74**–72

=== Semifinals ===
In the semifinals, the highest seeded team hosts games 1 and 3, while the second-highest seeded team hosts game 2.

Due to Batangas City advancing after game 2, Muntinlupa instead hosted game 3.

Team 1	Series	Team 2	Game 1	Game 2	Game 3
**(1) Batangas City Athletics**	2–0	(4) Valenzuela Classic	**80**–75	**89**–64	—
**(2) Muntinlupa Cagers**	2–1	(7) Parañaque Patriots	59–**84**	**66**–56	**81**–70

=== Finals ===
In the MPBL finals, the higher-seeded team hosts games 1, 2, and 5, while the lower-seeded team hosts games 3 and 4.

Team 1	Series	Team 2	Game 1	Game 2	Game 3	Game 4	Game 5
**(1) Batangas City Athletics**	3–1	(2) Muntinlupa Cagers	**70**–64	**78**–74	77–**82**	**68**–66	—

== Records ==
- On February 20, 2018, The Muntinlupa Cagers became the first team in league history to score at least 100 points in a single game, doing so against the Quezon City Capitals. It was also the only such occurrence throughout the entire season.

== Statistics ==
=== Individual statistic leaders ===
Category	Player	Team	Statistic
Points per game	Gary David	Bataan Defenders	34.4
Rebounds per game	Felix Apreku	Muntinlupa Cagers	11.1
Assists per game	Allan Mangahas	Muntinlupa Cagers	5.3
Steals per game	Allan Mangahas	Muntinlupa Cagers	1.78
Blocks per game	Jay Collado	Quezon City Capitals	1.92
Turnovers per game	Chestern Ian Melencio	Imus Bandera	3.44
Fouls per game	Daniel De Guzman	Parañaque Patriots	3.64
Minutes per game	Harold Miguel Arboleda	Parañaque Patriots	33.2
FG%	Mark San Jose	Parañaque Patriots	100.0%
FT%	ten players		100.0%
3FG%	two players		100.0%
Double-doubles	Felix Apreku	Muntinlupa Cagers	6
Double-doubles	Harold Miguel Arboleda	Parañaque Patriots	6
Triple-doubles	Andrew Estrella	Quezon City Capitals	1

=== Individual game highs ===
Category	Player	Team	Statistic
Points	Gary David	Bataan Defenders	29
Rebounds	Gian Abrigo	Quezon City Capitals	20
Assists	Paolo Hubalde	Valenzuela Classic	14
Steals	six players		4
Blocks	Jayson Grimaldo	Batangas City Athletics	5
Blocks	Jeff Morillo	Quezon City Capitals	5
Three-pointers	Val Acuña	Batangas City Athletics	7

=== Team statistic leaders (regular season) ===
Category	Team	Statistic
Points per game	Bulacan Kuyas	83.6
Rebounds per game	Quezon City Capitals	49.0
Assists per game	Bulacan Kuyas	22.2
Steals per game	Muntinlupa Cagers	9.0
Blocks per game	Bulacan Kuyas	6.6
Turnovers per game	Bataan Defenders	18.4
Fouls per game	Imus Bandera	20.8
FG%	Bulacan Kuyas	45.39%
FT%	Batangas City Athletics	70.63%
3FG%	Valenzuela Classic	35.07%
+/−	Batangas City Athletics	+8.3

== Media ==
This season marked the first of three years of ABS-CBN's broadcast rights with the league. Games were aired on the S+A channel in both SD and HD quality.
