= Juneric Baloria =

Filipino basketball player

Personal information
- Born: June 3, 1990 (age 36) Tubod, Lanao del Norte, Philippines
- Listed height: 5 ft 11 in (1.80 m)
- Listed weight: 180 lb (82 kg)

Career information
- College: Perpetual
- PBA draft: 2014: 3rd round, 30th overall pick
- Drafted by: Blackwater Elite
- Playing career: 2014–present
- Position: Shooting guard

Career history
- 2014–2015: NLEX Road Warriors
- 2015: Mahindra Enforcer
- 2018: Parañaque Patriots
- 2018–2019: Pampanga Lanterns
- 2019–2020: Makati Super Crunch
- 2021: Basilan Peace Riders
- 2021–2022: Blackwater Bossing
- 2022–2025: Batangas City Embassy Chill/Tanduay Rum Masters

Career highlights
- NCAA Philippines Rookie of the Year (2013)

Juneric "Jong" Davalos Baloria (born June 3, 1990) is a Filipino professional basketball player for the Batangas City Tanduay Rum Masters of the Maharlika Pilipinas Basketball League (MPBL). He was drafted 30th overall pick by the Blackwater Elite in the 2014 PBA draft. He was traded to the NLEX Road Warriors along with 2016 and 2017 second-round picks for Jason Ballesteros and Sunday Salvacion.

== Amateur career ==
Baloria was a member of the UPHSD Altas, the men's varsity basketball team of the University of Perpetual Help System DALTA (UPHSD) started at the NCAA Season 89 basketball tournaments in 2013. He was named NCAA Player of the Week after leading the Altas to winning both of their games of the week in July 2013. Perpetual Help finished fourth after the elimination round, scoring a semifinal match-up against the #1 seed San Beda Red Lions. Baloria scored only six points in the game, to see the Altas lose by 19 points to be eliminated. Baloria was named 2013 NCAA Rookie of the Year after finishing 11th in statistical points. After the 2013 NCAA season, Baloria suited up for the Big Chill Super Chargers PBA D-League team, scoring 22 points on his debut game. In the 2013 Philippine Collegiate Championship, the Altas were eliminated by the NU Bulldogs in the Sweet 16 round, with Baloria scoring 24 points; Baloria could've sent the game into overtime but his shot missed the rim completely.

As part of the warm-ups for the NCAA Season 90 basketball tournaments, the Altas participated in the 2014 Filoil Flying V Preseason Hanes Cup. Baloria scored 43 points in a win against the De La Salle Green Archers, but were still eliminated from playoff contention. The Altas wounded up fourth after the elimination round of the 2014 NCAA season to face the San Beda Red Lions in the semifinals, but they lost against them for the second consecutive year, with Baloria scoring 20 points in the semifinal.

== Professional career ==
On August 27, Baloria was picked 30th overall in the 2014 PBA draft by expansion team Blackwater Sports. On September, Blackwater dealt Baloria to fellow expansion club NLEX Road Warriors. Baloria was prohibited to sign with any PBA team while the NCAA season was ongoing. After the Altas were eliminated, UPHSD coach Aric del Rosario that Baloria is ready for the PBA after he led the NCAA in scoring.

Baloria debuted in NLEX's win against the GlobalPort Batang Pier, but scored no points. Baloria scored three points in NLEX's next game, a loss against the Talk 'N Text Tropang Texters. He was traded to the Enforcer in a deal that sent Sean Anthony to NLEX (from Meralco via Mahindra) which gave up 2016 and 2017 second-round picks.

== PBA career statistics ==
Legend
GP	Games played	MPG	Minutes per game
FG%	Field-goal percentage	3P%	3-point field-goal percentage	FT%	Free-throw percentage
RPG	Rebounds per game	APG	Assists per game	SPG	Steals per game
BPG	Blocks per game	PPG	Points per game	**Bold**	Career high

As of the end of 2021 season

=== Season-by-season averages ===
Year	Team	GP	MPG	FG%	3P%	FT%	RPG	APG	SPG	BPG	PPG
2014–15	NLEX	**17**	6.4	.345	.100	.739	.8	.1	**.1**	**.1**	3.5
2015–16	Mahindra	1	2.7	.000	—	—	1.0	.0	.0	.0	.0
2021	Blackwater	7	**10.6**	**.385**	**.308**	**.778**	**2.4**	**.7**	**.1**	.0	**4.4**
Career		25	7.4	.353	.182	.750	1.3	.3	.1	.1	3.6
