= Val Acuña =

Filipino basketball player

No. 21 – GenSan Warriors
- Position: Small forward / shooting guard
- League: MPBL

Personal information
- Born: August 8, 1986 (age 40) Ilagan, Isabela, Philippines
- Listed height: 6 ft 3 in (1.91 m)
- Listed weight: 180 lb (82 kg)

Career information
- College: UE
- PBA draft: 2010: 2nd round, 13th overall pick
- Drafted by: B-Meg Derby Ace Llamados
- Playing career: 2010–present

Career history
- 2009–2010: Philippine Patriots
- 2010–2013: Purefoods Tender Juicy Giants / B-Meg Derby Ace Llamados / B-Meg Llamados
- 2013: San Miguel Beermen (ABL)
- 2013–2014: San Mig Coffee Mixers / San Mig Super Coffee Mixers
- 2014: GlobalPort Batang Pier
- 2014–2015: Blackwater Elite
- 2015–2016: Pacquiao Powervit Pilipinas Aguilas / Pilipinas MX3 Kings
- 2016–2017: Alab Pilipinas
- 2018–2019: Batangas City Athletics
- 2019–2020: Valenzuela Classic
- 2021: MJAS Zenith–Talisay Aquastars
- 2022–2023: Sta. Rosa Laguna Lions
- 2023: Muntinlupa Cagers
- 2024–present: South Cotabato / GenSan Warriors

Career highlights
- 4× PBA champion (2012 Commissioner's, 2013 Governors', 2013–14 Philippine, 2014 Commissioner's); 2× ABL champion (2010, 2013); MPBL champion (2018); MPBL Finals MVP (2018)

Hezy Val B. Acuña II (born August 8, 1986) is a Filipino professional basketball player for the GenSan Warriors franchise of the Maharlika Pilipinas Basketball League (MPBL) and Pilipinas Super League (PSL).

Acuña is a six-time professional champion in both the Philippine Basketball Association (PBA) and ASEAN Basketball League (ABL). He also earned a championship in the MPBL during its amateur era, earning a Finals MVP nod in 2018.

== Collegiate career ==
Acuña played straight out of the University of the East Red Warriors in the University Athletic Association of the Philippines, where he played for five seasons (2004 and 2006 to 2009). He was also part of the Warriors team that finished runner-up to the Ateneo de Manila Blue Eagles in the 2009 season, where he averaged 19.2 points 7.2 assist and 11.2 rebounds in almost 32 minutes.

== Professional career ==
Acuña was selected in the 2010 PBA draft by the B-Meg Derby Ace Llamados third overall in the second round over Ford Arao and Jai Reyes. He previously played for the Philippine Patriots in the ABL.

In 2015, Acuña returned to the ABL after signing a contract with the Pacquiao Powervit Pilipinas Aguilas (now the Pilipinas MX3 Kings).

== Career statistics ==
Legend
GP	Games played	MPG	Minutes per game
FG%	Field-goal percentage	3P%	3-point field-goal percentage	FT%	Free-throw percentage
RPG	Rebounds per game	APG	Assists per game	SPG	Steals per game
BPG	Blocks per game	PPG	Points per game	**Bold**	Career high

=== PBA ===
Year	Team	GP	MPG	FG%	3P%	FT%	RPG	APG	SPG	BPG	PPG
2010–11	B-Meg Derby Ace	6	6.7	.200	**.364**	.833	.7	.3	.0	**.2**	2.8
2011–12	B-Meg	14	1.6	.273	.286	—	.3	.0	.0	.0	.6
2012–13	San Mig Coffee	11	4.7	**.467**	.300	**1.000**	.5	.0	.0	.0	1.7
2013–14	San Mig Super Coffee	13	7.2	.326	.231	.571	.5	.6	.2	.0	3.1
2014–15	Blackwater	**22**	**13.8**	.289	.304	.565	**2.0**	**.6**	**.5**	.0	**4.7**
Career		66	7.7	.303	.293	.632	1.0	.4	.2	.0	2.8

=== MPBL ===
Year	Team	GP	GS	MPG	FG%	3P%	FT%	RPG	APG	SPG	BPG	PPG
2018	Batangas City	17	17	**23.9**	**.407**	**.379**	.700	2.9	1.2	0.4	0.1	**13.4**
2018–19	Batangas City	**29**	**24**	17.5	.326	.301	.563	2.1	0.9	0.5	0.1	8.0
2019–20	Batangas City	13	12	23.4	.286	.256	.714	**3.3**	1.1	0.6	0.0	7.7
2019–20	Valenzuela	13	7	23.3	.374	.342	.762	2.9	0.9	**0.9**	**0.3**	13.1
2023	Muntinlupa	15	8	17.4	.338	.317	**.870**	1.9	**1.5**	0.3	0.1	9.7
