= Meycauayan Marilao Gems =

Professional basketball team in southern Bulacan, Philippines

- 2026 Meycauayan Marilao Gems season
- League: MPBL (2018–present)
- Founded: 2018; 8 years ago
- History: Muntinlupa Cagers; 2018–2025; Meycauayan Marilao Gems; 2026–present
- Arena: Meycauayan Sports Complex; San Jose Del Monte Sports Complex
- Location: Meycauayan, Bulacan; Marilao, Bulacan
- Team colors
- Head coach: Jonathan Banal
- Championships: 0

The Meycauayan Marilao Gems are a Philippine professional basketball team based in the southern portion of Bulacan, representing both Meycauayan and Marilao. The team competes in the Maharlika Pilipinas Basketball League (MPBL) as a member of the North Division. The team plays their home games at San Jose del Monte Sports Complex.

The team was originally known as the Muntinlupa Cagers as one of the league's founding teams, first established for the 2018 season, where they also made their only finals appearance to date. The team also took part in FilBasket.

In 2026, new ownership acquired the franchise and brought the team to southern Bulacan ahead of the 2026 season, therefore making them the first team in the league to relocate. The Gems became the second team to represent Bulacan, after the Bulacan Kuyas.

== History ==
=== Muntinlupa Cagers ===
The Muntinlupa Cagers were founded in 2018 as one of the MPBL's ten charter teams for the 2018 season. The Cagers experienced immediate success, finishing with a 6–3 record. Muntinlupa claimed the third seed and first swept Navotas in the Quarterfinals. They then had the Parañaque Patriots, who were coming off an upset against second-seeded Bulacan. Parañaque won the first game of the series, but Muntinlupa, who were led by the likes Chito Jaime, Felix Apreku, and Allan Mangahas, took the next two games to advance to the 2018 MPBL finals against the Batangas City Athletics. Muntinlupa went on to lose the series in four games, making Batangas City the league's inaugural champions.

Muntinlupa continued winning in the 2018–19 season, keeping the same core players and once again claiming third seed in the South Division with a 15–10 record. Their playoff run was cut short, however, as the Cagers lost to sixth-seeded Zamboanga in the first round.

Heading into the 2019–20 season, most of its core players left the team, with Jaime moving to Bataan, Apreku moving to Pampanga, and Mangahas moving to Biñan City. The Cagers, now led by GJ Ylagan, win only seven games in the 30-game season, which ranked the team 13th in the South. In 2022 Muntinlupa finished with a 6–15 record, and barely made the playoff picture, by ranking 8th in the South. The team then lost to Zamboanga once again in the first round.

Muntinlupa then rebuilt its roster for the 2023 season. With the acquisitions of collegiate players John Amores and JL Delos Santos, as well as former Davao Occidental member Marco Balagtas, the Cagers rose to a 16–12 record, ranking sixth in the South. Muntinlupa faces the third-seeded GenSan Warriors in the first round.

=== Meycauayan Marilao Gems ===
In 2026, after new ownership acquired the Muntinlupa franchise, the team relocated to southern Bulacan. The team was originally going to be named the Marilao Gems, before adding Meycauayan to its location identifier. The Gems would become the second team hailing from the province of Bulacan.

== Home arenas ==
From 2018 to 2023, the Muntinlupa Cagers have always played their home games in Muntinlupa Sports Center. Starting in 2026, the team will play their home games in San Jose del Monte Sports Complex.

Venue	Location	2018	2018–19	2019–20	2022	2023	2024	2025	2026
Muntinlupa Sports Center	Muntinlupa	✓	✓	✓	✓	✓	✗	✗	—N/a
San Jose del Monte Sports Complex	San Jose del Monte, Bulacan	—N/a							✓

== Current roster ==
Meycauayan Marilao Gems roster
Players

Pos.	No.	Name	Height	Weight	DOB	From
G	0	MJ Dela Virgen	5 ft 10 in (1.78 m)		1997–03–31	José Rizal
G	3	Patrick Ramos	6 ft 0 in (1.83 m)		1999–04–05	José Rizal
G	4	Agem Miranda	6 ft 1 in (1.85 m)		1999–09–04	José Rizal
F	5	Joshua Guiab	6 ft 2 in (1.88 m)			José Rizal
F	7	Jeric Serrano (HG)	6 ft 3 in (1.91 m)		1996–11–26	Lyceum
G	8	Robi Nayve	5 ft 11 in (1.80 m)		1999–09–23	St. Benilde
G	9	Shawn Argente	5 ft 9 in (1.75 m)		2001–10–31	José Rizal
F	10	Nat Cosejo	6 ft 3 in (1.91 m)			Emilio Aguinaldo
G	11	Al Gemotra (HG)	5 ft 10 in (1.78 m)			NCBA
F	12	Vince Tolentino	6 ft 3 in (1.91 m)	190 lb (86 kg)	1993–08–27	Ateneo
G	13	Renz De Vera (HG)	6 ft 0 in (1.83 m)			NCBA
F	14	Jayson Apolonio	6 ft 3 in (1.91 m)		1995–06–15	DMMMSU
F/C	15	Felix Apreku	6 ft 4 in (1.93 m)		1991–12–06	Letran
F	16	CJ Catapusan	6 ft 3 in (1.91 m)		1997–01–29	Philippines
G	17	Arvin Emeterio (HG)	6 ft 0 in (1.83 m)			STI
F	19	Ivan Santos (HG)	5 ft 11 in (1.80 m)		1997–08–14	TIP
G	20	Russell Ogana (HG)	5 ft 11 in (1.80 m)			STI
G	24	Jimboy Pasturan	5 ft 10 in (1.78 m)		1997–10–24	St. Benilde
C	25	Miles Cañal	6 ft 5 in (1.96 m)
G	28	Bing Cervantes (HG)	5 ft 11 in (1.80 m)			STI
G	32	Brix Ramos	6 ft 2 in (1.88 m)			UP Diliman
F	44	Dean Degamo (HG)	6 ft 2 in (1.88 m)			NCBA

Coaches

Head coach

- Jonathan Banal

Assistant coach(es)

- Dexter Rosales
- Nate Santos
- Isaiah Banal
- Brian Monday
- Kian Caratay
- Francis Amores

Team manager

- Kaizer Galvez

Legend

- (HG) Homegrown
- (FF) Filipino-foreigner
- (EA) EASL player
- (RS) Reserve player
- (S) Suspended
- Injured

- Roster – via Genius Sports
Updated as of: June 22, 2026

=== Head coaches ===
Muntinlupa Cagers / Meycauayan Marilao Gems head coaches
#	Name	Start	End	Achievements	Ref.
1	Aldrin Morante	2018	2018–19	—	
2	Aldin Ayo	2018–19	2018–19	—	
3	Jack Azcueta	2018–19	2018–19	—	
4	Richie Melencio	2019	2019	—	
5	Dave Moralde	2019	2019–20	—	
6	Bonnie Garcia	2019–20	2019–20	—	
7	Louie Gonzalez	2021	2021	—	
8	Jules Hidalgo	2022	2022	—	
9	Vincent Salvador	2022	2022	—	
10	Jack Azcueta	2023	2023	—	
11	Aldrin Morante	2023	2023	—	
12	Mixson Ramos	2024	2024	—	
13	Giovanni Ludovice	2025	2025	—	
14	Jonathan Banal	2026	current	—	

== Notable players ==
=== Individual award winners ===
All-MPBL First Team

- Allan Mangahas – 2019

=== MPBL All-Star Day ===
All-Star selections

- Allan Mangahas – 2019
- GJ Ylagan – 2020
- Biboy Enguio – 2022
- John Amores – 2023
- Marco Balagtas – 2023
- JL Delos Santos – 2023

Pre-game event winners

- Domark Matillano – 2022

=== PBA players ===
Ex-PBA players

- Val Acuña
- Chad Alonzo
- Harold Arboleda
- Egay Billones
- Miguel Corteza
- Biboy Enguio
- Rey Guevarra
- Chito Jaime
- Al Vergara

Drafted to PBA

- Kemark Cariño – 13th overall, season 48

=== Other notable players ===
- Bong Go

== Season-by-season records ==
League champions
Division champions
Qualified for playoffs
Best regular season record

Season	Regular season							Playoffs	
Season	Division	Finish	GP	W	L	PCT	GB	Stage	Results
Muntinlupa Cagers
2018; Rajah Cup	— (Note: The 2018 season had no division alignment.)	3rd	9	6	3	.667	2	Quarterfinals; Semifinals; Finals	won vs. Navotas, 2–0 won vs. Parañaque, 2–1 lost vs. Batangas City, 1–3
2018–19; Datu Cup	South	3rd	25	15	10	.600	5	Division quarterfinals	lost vs. Zamboanga, 1–2
2019–20; Lakan Season	South	13th	30	7	23	.233	19	Did not qualify	
2022	South	8th	21	6	15	.286	12	Division quarterfinals	lost vs. Zamboanga, 0–2
2023	South	6th	28	16	12	.571	7	Division quarterfinals	lost vs. General Santos, 1–2
2024	South	11th	28	7	21	.250	14	Did not qualify	
2025	South	12th	29	10	19	.345	15	Did not qualify	
Meycauayan Marilao Gems
2026	North	4th	25	14	11	.560	9	Division quarterfinals	lost vs. Pasay, 1–2
All-time regular season record			195	81	114	.415		5 playoff appearances	
All-time playoff record			20	8	12	.400		1 finals appearance	
All-time overall record			215	89	126	.414		0 championships	
