= Quezon City Black Bulls =

Professional basketball team in Quezon City, Philippines

- 2026 Quezon City Black Bulls season
- League: MPBL
- Founded: 2018; 8 years ago
- History: Quezon City Capitals; 2018–2020; Quezon City MG/MG Cars; 2022; Quezon City Gaz N Go; 2023; Quezon City Toda Aksyon; 2023–2024; Quezon City Galeries Taipan; 2025; Quezon City Black Bulls; 2026–present
- Arena: Quezon City District 2 Gymnasium
- Location: Quezon City
- Team colors
- Head coach: Jayv Olea

The Quezon City Black Bulls are a Philippine professional basketball team based in Quezon City. The team competes in the Maharlika Pilipinas Basketball League (MPBL) as a member of the league's North Division. The team plays its home games at Quezon City District 2 Gymnasium.

The Quezon City franchise began play in the 2018 season, going by the Quezon City Capitals. The original name references Quezon City's status as the national capital of the Philippines from 1949 until 1976. It may also reference Quezon City being the biggest and most populous city in Metro Manila.

The Quezon City franchise is one of four teams based in the Eastern Manila District of Metro Manila.

== History ==
The Quezon City Capitals and Imus Bandera were the last teams to join the inaugural season of the MPBL. The team was represented by City Councilor Onyx Crisologo during the contract signing with the League headed by Commissioner Kenneth Duremdes. During the team's inaugural season, Andrew Estrella recorded the league's first triple-double against the Bataan Defenders. The team finished with a 5–4 to clinch the fifth seed in the playoffs, where the Capitals would lose 1–2 to the Valenzuela Classic.

In the 2018–19 season, the team fell one game below .500 with a 12–13 record. Despite that, the team still ranked seventh in the regular season, earning them a playoff berth. The team would pull off a major upset as they swept the second-seeded Makati Super Crunch, before falling to the eventual champion San Juan Knights. In the 2019–20 season, the Capitals didn't perform well compared to the previous two seasons and finished 10–20, finishing 12th in the North and failed to make the playoffs for the first time.

Logo of the Quezon City Toda Aksyon used in 2023, under the sponsorship of VFresh.

Entering the 2022 season, the team acquired a title sponsorship with MG Motor and became Quezon City MG. Although the team finished 9–12, they still ranked seventh to advance to the playoffs, losing to Pasig City MCW Sports. The team then found a new title sponsor in Gaz N Go entering the 2023 season, becoming Quezon City Gaz N Go. Mid-season, the team underwent new management as it has gained the backing of the Toda Aksyon Partylist, thus renaming the team Quezon City Toda Aksyon.

For the 2026 season, the team changed their name as the Quezon City Black Bulls.

== Home venues ==
The Quezon City franchise has played in three home venues thus far, all of them are on-campus venues. Their first home venue in the 2018 season was the Seed Dome at JCSGO Christian Academy. The other two, introduced in the 2018–19 season, were Ateneo de Manila University's Blue Eagle Gym and Trinity University of Asia's Henry Noble Gymnasium.

After not being able to play at home in 2022 and 2023, the team played at Amoranto Arena in the 2024 season. It was the first venue that wasn't on-campus.

In the 2025 season, the team found its primary venue in Commonwealth, at the Quezon City District 2 Gymnasium.

In the 2026 season, the team played its home games at a new alternate primary venue in Novaliches, at the Novadeci Convention Center.

Venue	Location	2018	2018–19	2019–20	2022	2023	2024	2025	2026
JCSGO Christian Academy (JCSGO Seed Dome)	Quezon City	✓	✓	✓	✗	✗	✗	✗	✗
Blue Eagle Gym	Quezon City	✗	✓	✓	✗	✗	✗	✗	✗
Trinity University of Asia (Henry Noble Gymnasium)	Quezon City	✗	✓	✗	✗	✗	✗	✗	✗
Amoranto Arena	Quezon City	✗	✗	✗	✗	✗	✓	✗	✗
Quezon City District 2 Gymnasium	Quezon City	✗	✗	✗	✗	✗	✗	✓	✗
Novadeci Convention Center	Quezon City	✗	✗	✗	✗	✗	✗	✗	✓

== Current roster ==
Quezon City Black Bulls roster
Players

Pos.	No.	Name	Height	Weight	DOB	From
G	3	Kenz Rei Diokno	5 ft 10 in (1.78 m)		2002–11–20	Gardner College
G	4	Ryan Costelo	5 ft 6 in (1.68 m)		1995–05–16	San Sebastian
G	5	Val Chauca	5 ft 10 in (1.78 m)		1994–10–11	Adamson
G	6	Gab Salazar (HG)	5 ft 11 in (1.80 m)			Gardner College
G	7	Patrick Buena (HG)	5 ft 8 in (1.73 m)		2000–05–31	Gardner College
G/F	8	Aldave Canoy	6 ft 3 in (1.91 m)		2000–10–25	CSAV
G/F	10	Carmel Espinosa	6 ft 4 in (1.93 m)			Gardner College
F	11	Clark Derige	6 ft 3 in (1.91 m)		1994–07–06	UE
F	15	Aeron Bagunu	6 ft 4 in (1.93 m)			Far Eastern
F/C	17	Jessie Sumoda	6 ft 5 in (1.96 m)		1997–07–24	San Sebastian
G	20	Joshua Roque (HG)	5 ft 11 in (1.80 m)		1995–09–20	San Sebastian
G	22	Joeben Loria (HG)	6 ft 2 in (1.88 m)			Gardner College
F/C	23	Jay Gadon	6 ft 5 in (1.96 m)			TIP
G/F	24	Christian Jake Agoncillo	6 ft 3 in (1.91 m)		2002–11–24	Gardner College
G/F	26	Joe Joven	6 ft 4 in (1.93 m)			Gardner College
G	27	MJ Joson	5 ft 11 in (1.80 m)		2001–12–11	MCU
F	31	Rey Publico (HG)	6 ft 4 in (1.93 m)		1992–11–29	Letran
F	34	Costudio Lastra Jr. (HG)	6 ft 0 in (1.83 m)			Gardner College
G/F	39	Kobe Bryan Monje	6 ft 4 in (1.93 m)		2000–11–23	Letran
F/C	72	Ammar Cosari	6 ft 5 in (1.96 m)			San Sebastian
G	76	Brian Rosalin	6 ft 1 in (1.85 m)		2000–09–07	Arellano
F	88	Jeff Morillo	6 ft 5 in (1.96 m)			TIP
G	91	Charles Dela Cruz (HG)	6 ft 0 in (1.83 m)		2000–04–29	OLFU

Coaches

Head coach

- Jayv Olea

Assistant coach(es)

- Biboy Santiago
- Mico Santos
- Marco Asa
- Zinno Gudez
- Jeff Morillo
- Aeron Bgas
- Aong Wong

Team manager

- JC Tan
- Rico Estrada

Legend

- (HG) Homegrown
- (FF) Filipino-foreigner
- (EA) EASL player
- (RS) Reserve player
- (S) Suspended
- Injured

- Roster – via Genius Sports
Updated as of: June 22, 2026

=== Head coaches ===
Quezon City Black Bulls head coaches
#	Name	Start	End	Achievements	Ref.
1	Vis Valencia	2018	2019	—	
2	Christian Coronel	2019	2020	—	
3	Alvin Grey	2022	2022	—	
4	Teng Torcuator	2023	2023	—	
5	Weng Adina	2023	2023	—	
6	Edgar Macaraya	2023	2024	—	
7	Jeff Perlas	2025	2025	—	
8	Jayv Olea	2026	current	—	

== Notable players ==
=== MPBL All-Star Day ===
All-Star selections

- Jay Collado – 2019
- Clark Derige – 2020
- Genmar Bragais – 2022
- Jason Ballesteros – 2024
- Rhinwill Yambing – 2024

=== PBA players ===
Ex-PBA players

- Marcy Arellano
- Jason Ballesteros
- Jojo Duncil
- Hesed Gabo
- James Martinez
- Josan Nimes
- Rey Publico
- Magi Sison

== Season-by-season records ==
Note: Statistics are correct as of the end of the 2026 MPBL season.

MPBL champions	Division champions	Playoff berth

Season	League	Division	Regular season						Playoffs	
Season	League	Division	Finish	Played	Wins	Losses	Win %	GB	Round	Results
Quezon City Capitals
2018	MPBL	—	5th	9	5	4	.556	3	Quarterfinals	lost vs. Valenzuela, 1–2
2018–19	MPBL	North	7th	25	12	13	.480	11	Division quarterfinals Division semifinals	won vs. Makati, 2–0 lost vs. San Juan, 0–2
2019–20	MPBL	North	12th	30	10	20	.333	16	Did not qualify	
Quezon City MG
2022	MPBL	North	7th	21	9	12	.429	12	Division quarterfinals	lost vs. Pasig City, 0–2
Quezon City Toda Aksyon
2023	MPBL	North	14th	28	3	25	.107	23	Did not qualify	
2024	MPBL	North	9th	28	15	13	.536	11	Did not qualify	
Quezon City Galeries Taipan
2025	MPBL	North	12th	29	7	22	.241	21	Did not qualify	
Quezon City Black Bulls
2026	MPBL	North	9th	25	11	14	.440	12	Division quarterfinals	lost vs. Abra, 0–2
Regular season record				195	72	123	.369		4 playoff appearances	
Playoff record				11	3	8	.273		0 finals appearances	
Cumulative record				206	75	131	.364		0 championships	
