= Parañaque Patriots =

Professional basketball team in Parañaque, Philippines

- 2026 Parañaque Patriots season
- League: MPBL (2018–present)
- Founded: 2017; 9 years ago
- History: Parañaque Patriots; 2017–present
- Arena: Olivarez College Coliseum; Parañaque Coliseum; Villar Coliseum (Las Piñas)
- Location: Parañaque
- Team colors
- Main sponsor: Okada Manila
- Head coach: JR Villanueva

The Parañaque Patriots are a Filipino professional basketball team based in Parañaque. The team competes in the Maharlika Pilipinas Basketball League (MPBL) as a member of the league's North Division. The team plays its home games at the gymnasium of Olivarez College.

The team is one of the MPBL's charter teams during the league's 2018 season. The team is currently owned by the City Government of Parañaque and its vice mayor Joan Villafuerte.

Despite a successful inaugural season where the Patriots reached the semifinals as the seventh seed, the Parañaque-based franchise didn't make the playoffs in the next four seasons from 2019 to 2023 (the team did not play in 2022), which is tied with the Biñan Tatak Gel and Mindoro Tamaraws for the longest playoff drought in the MPBL including non-playing seasons.

The Patriots are one of two teams based in the Southern Manila District of Metro Manila, alongside the Pasay Voyagers.

== History ==
The Patriots were one of the ten charter teams in the MPBL as part of the 2018 season. On January 25, 2018, Parañaque played in the inaugural game against the Caloocan Supremos, where they won, 70-60. Despite finishing the season with a losing record, Parañaque made the playoffs as the seventh seed. They went against the second-seeded Bulacan Kuyas in the Quarterfinals where they would pull off an upset, beating Bulacan in three games. In the Semifinals against the Muntinlupa Cagers, Parañaque won game 1, but fell in the next 2 games to be eliminated.

Despite the Cinderella run, Parañaque would not perform well in the next three seasons, finishing 9-16 (10th) and 8-22 (14th) in the 2018–19 and 2019–20 seasons, respectively. When the team then returned in 2023 after taking a hiatus the previous season, they missed the playoffs for a third consecutive season with an 11th place finish and an 11–17 record.

In 2024, the team acquired former Finals MVP Mark Yee from the departing Bacoor City Strikers, but was later released during the free agency window in June.

== Home venues ==
In every season the team took part in, the Parañaque Patriots have always played their home games in Olivarez College. In 2024, the Patriots played a home game at Villar Coliseum, which is located in the adjacent Las Piñas.

Venue	Location	2018	2018–19	2019–20	2022	2023	2024
Olivarez College (Olivarez College Gymnasium)	Parañaque	✓	✓	✓	DNP	✓	✓
Villar Coliseum	Las Piñas	✗	✗	✗	DNP	✗	✓

== Current roster ==
Parañaque Patriots roster
Players

Pos.	No.	Name	Height	Weight	DOB	From
G	0	Paolo Castro (HG)	5 ft 11 in (1.80 m)		1994–09–18	Olivarez
F	1	James Mangahas	6 ft 3 in (1.91 m)		1986–10–08	De La Salle
F	3	Jay-R Taganas	6 ft 3 in (1.91 m)	191 lb (87 kg)	1987–09–01	San Beda
G	4	Allan Mangahas	6 ft 2 in (1.88 m)		1987–11–14	Mapúa
G	6	John Michael Cruz	5 ft 10 in (1.78 m)
F	7	Dennies Ombao	5 ft 10 in (1.78 m)
G	8	Domark Legario Matillano	5 ft 11 in (1.80 m)		1993–05–28	PL Muntinlupa
G	9	Ronilo Castro	5 ft 10 in (1.78 m)
G	11	Ryusei Koga (FF, HG)	5 ft 9 in (1.75 m)		1992–06–21	San Beda
G	13	John Emmanuel Labastida	5 ft 10 in (1.78 m)
G/F	16	Kurt Lojera	6 ft 1 in (1.85 m)	188 lb (85 kg)	1995–10–16	De La Salle
G	17	Bryan Dela Rosa	5 ft 10 in (1.78 m)
G	18	Paolo Miguel Andres	5 ft 10 in (1.78 m)
F	19	Jomar Santos	6 ft 2 in (1.88 m)		1985–11–19	St. Clare of Caloocan
G	21	Art Cosa (HG)	5 ft 10 in (1.78 m)		2000–11–03	Emilio Aguinaldo
F	22	Samuel Peralta	6 ft 5 in (1.96 m)		1998–09–24	Enderun
G	24	Marlon Monte	6 ft 1 in (1.85 m)		1988–08–24	PUP
G	25	Janfil Jusayan	6 ft 0 in (1.83 m)			STI
F/C	26	Mark Sarangay (HG)	6 ft 6 in (1.98 m)		1987–01–07	Mapúa
G	71	Roldan Sara	5 ft 9 in (1.75 m)		1993–01–20	San Beda
G	77	Jobert Medina	6 ft 1 in (1.85 m)		1995–06–07	De La Salle Araneta
G	81	Joseph Laslee Terso	5 ft 10 in (1.78 m)	162 lb (73 kg)	1990–05–18	National-U

Coaches

Head coach

- JR Villanueva

Assistant coach(es)

- RJ Mojica
- Darwin Santos
- Marvin Mijares
- Paul Dela Cruz

Team manager

- Jason Dela Cruz
- Joel Mendoza

Legend

- (HG) Homegrown
- (FF) Filipino-foreigner
- (EA) EASL player
- (RS) Reserve player
- (S) Suspended
- Injured

- Roster – via Genius Sports
Updated as of: June 22, 2026

=== Head coaches ===
Parañaque Patriots head coaches
#	Name	Start	End	Achievements	Ref.
1	Aric del Rosario	2018	2018	—	
2	Eric Samson	2018	2018	—	
3	Richie Melencio	2018	2018–19	—	
4	Monel Kallos	2018–19	2018–19	—	
5	Michael Saguiguit	2019–20	2025	—	
6	Stephen Mopera	2025	2025	—	
7	Melquiades Villanueva	2025	2025	—	
8	JR Villanueva	2026	current	—	

== Notable players ==
=== Individual award winners ===
MPBL Homegrown Player of the Year

- JR Olegario – 2024

All-MPBL Second Team

- JP Sarao – 2024

=== MPBL All-Star Day ===
All-Star selections

- Paolo Castro – 2019
- Jayboy Solis – 2020
- Jielo Razon – 2024
- JP Sarao – 2024

=== PBA players ===
Ex-PBA players

- Harold Arboleda
- Juneric Baloria
- Alvin Pasaol
- Mark Yee

Drafted to PBA

- Jielo Razon – Undrafted, 2024

== Season-by-season records ==
League champions
Division champions
Qualified for playoffs
Best regular season record

Season	Regular season							Playoffs	
Season	Division	Finish	GP	W	L	PCT	GB	Stage	Results
Parañaque Patriots
2018; Rajah Cup	None	7th	9	4	5	.444	4	Quarterfinals; Semifinals	won vs. Bulacan, 2–1 lost vs. Muntinlupa, 1–2
2018–19; Datu Cup	South	12th	25	8	17	.360	12	Did not qualify	
2019–20; Lakan Season	North	14th	30	8	22	.267	18	Did not qualify	
Did not participate in 2022
2023	North	11th	28	11	17	.393	15	Did not qualify	
2024	South	5th	28	17	11	.607	4	Division quarterfinals Division semifinals	won vs. Zamboanga, 2–1 lost vs. Quezon, 0–2
2025	South	15th	29	1	28	.034	24	Did not qualify	
2026	North	13th	25	2	23	.080	21	Did not qualify	
All-time regular season record			174	51	123	.293		2 playoff appearances	
All-time playoff record			11	5	6	.455		0 finals appearances	
All-time overall record			185	56	129	.303		0 championships	
