= Valenzuela City Darkhorse =

Professional basketball team in Valenzuela, Philippines

- 2026 Valenzuela City Darkhorse season
- League: MPBL
- Founded: 2017; 9 years ago
- History: Valenzuela Classic; 2018–2019, 2024; Valenzuela Idol Cheesedogs; 2018; Valenzuela SPV TOP Marketplace; 2019; Val City Carga Backload Solution; 2019–2020; Valenzuela MJAS Zenith; 2021; Valenzuela XUR Homes Realty Inc. 2022–2023; Val City Magic; 2025; Valenzuela City Darkhorse; 2026–present
- Arena: WES Arena
- Location: Valenzuela
- Team colors
- Head coach: Estong Ballesteros

The Valenzuela City Darkhorse is a Filipino professional basketball team based in Valenzuela. The team competes in the Maharlika Pilipinas Basketball League (MPBL) as a member of the league's North Division. The team plays its home games at WES Arena.

The team joined as the Valenzuela Classic in 2018 as one of the league's charter teams and has gone under multiple names, mostly integrating the title sponsor. The team is currently owned by the local government of Valenzuela. The Valenzuela-based franchise also took part in the Chooks-to-Go Pilipinas 3x3 and also has a Maharlika Pilipinas Volleyball Association counterpart, the Valenzuela Classy.

The Valenzuela franchise is one of two teams based in the Northern Manila District of Metro Manila, the other team being the Caloocan Batang Kankaloo.

== History ==
The Valenzuela Classic were one of the MPBL's ten charter teams, one of six based in Metro Manila, and one of three Valenzuela finished as one of three teams with a 6-3 record, claiming the fourth seed in the playoffs. They beat the Quezon City Capitals in the Quarterfinals before losing to the first-seeded Batangas City Athletics.

In the 2018–19 season, the team went 10-15, failing to make the playoffs as they ranked 10th in the North Division. In the following season, the team ranked at 10th once again with a record of 11-19.

Valenzuela then participated in the 2021 Invitational and failed to make the playoffs, ranking third in Group C after finishing 2-2. In the 2022 season, the team began playing home games at the Bahayang Pag-asa Sports Complex. The team finished 10-11, one game short of a winning record. Despite the losing record, the team still made the playoffs as the sixth seed, but were swept by the San Juan Knights in the First Round.

== Home venues ==
Through the history of the Valenzuela franchise, it has only used one venue per season. They first started at the Valenzuela Astrodome from 2018 to 2020, followed by the Bahayang Pag-asa Sports Complex in 2022, and currently the WES Arena since 2023.

Venue	Location	Capacity	2018	2018–19	2019–20	2022	2023	2024	2025
Valenzuela Astrodome	Valenzuela	3,000	✓	✓	✓	✗	✗	✗	✗
Bahayang Pag-asa Sports Complex	Valenzuela	N/A	✗	✗	✗	✓	✗	✗	✗
WES Arena	Valenzuela	N/A	✗	✗	✗	✗	✓	✓	✓

== Personnel ==
=== Current roster ===
Valenzuela City Darkhorse roster
Players

Pos.	No.	Name	Height	Weight	DOB	From
F	0	Lordy Casajeros	6 ft 1 in (1.85 m)		1989–10–30	UE
G	1	JR Olegario	5 ft 7 in (1.70 m)		1996–09–28	PL Muntinlupa
G	2	Nick Baluyot (HG)	5 ft 11 in (1.80 m)			MCU
F	4	Michael De Veyra	6 ft 3 in (1.91 m)			LCCM
F/C	5	Jay Collado	6 ft 4 in (1.93 m)			LSB
F	6	Lester Reyes	6 ft 4 in (1.93 m)		1991–09–18	SJIT
G	8	CJ Luengo (HG)	5 ft 11 in (1.80 m)		1994–12–17	VCTC
G	9	Michael Macaballug	5 ft 11 in (1.80 m)		1989–10–23	UE
G	11	Ian Melencio	5 ft 8 in (1.73 m)		1989–05–11	AIMS
F	13	JR Ongteco	6 ft 5 in (1.96 m)		1991-07-21	St. Benilde
F	15	Justin Alano	6 ft 2 in (1.88 m)			UPHSD
F	16	Carl Joshua Alattica	6 ft 8 in (2.03 m)
F	17	Nico Mamaradio	6 ft 1 in (1.85 m)			Arellano
G	18	Christian Rios (HG)	6 ft 2 in (1.88 m)		2000–10–07	Diliman
G	23	Geremy Robinson Jr. (FF)	6 ft 1 in (1.85 m)			UST
F	24	Angelo Obuyes	6 ft 0 in (1.83 m)			PL Muntinlupa
F/C	34	King Destacamento	6 ft 4 in (1.93 m)		1995–12–17	San Beda Alabang
G	39	Shaq Alanes	5 ft 11 in (1.80 m)		1992–08–17	Lyceum
G	71	Vincent Ralph Alba	5 ft 11 in (1.80 m)			PMMS
G	88	Yuan Pasumbal	5 ft 8 in (1.73 m)

Coaches

Head coach

- Estong Ballesteros

Assistant coach(es)

- June Dizon
- Oliver San Pedro

Team consultant

- Mark Dee

Team manager

- Ron Carambas

Legend

- (HG) Homegrown
- (FF) Filipino-foreigner
- (EA) EASL player
- (RS) Reserve player
- (S) Suspended
- Injured

- Roster – via Genius Sports
Updated as of: June 22, 2026

=== Head coaches ===
Valenzuela City Darkhorse head coaches
#	Name	Start	End	Achievements	Ref.
1	Chris Gavina	2018	2018–2019	—	
2	Eric Samson	2018–2019	2018–2019	—	
3	Juven Formacil	2018–2019	2018–2019	—	
4	Gerry Esplana	2019	2019	—	
5	Ronjay Enrile	2019	2021	—	
6	Aldrin Morante	2022	2022	—	
7	Lester Alvarez	2022	2022	—	
8	Jhon Velasquez	2023	2023	—	
9	Eric Martinez	2023	2023	—	
10	Aldrin Morante	2024	2024	—	
11	Raymond Valenzona	2025	2025	—	
12	Estong Ballesteros	2026	current	—	

== Notable players ==
=== MPBL All-Star Day ===
All-Star selections

- Paulo Hubalde – 2019, 2020
- Lester Alvarez – 2020
- Jaymar Gimpayan – 2022
- Carl Bryan Lacap – 2024
- JJ Gesalem – 2024

=== PBA players ===
Ex-PBA players

- Val Acuña
- Chad Alonzo
- Lester Alvarez
- Mark Andaya
- Cyrus Baguio
- Ronjay Buenafe
- Alfonzo Gotladera
- Paulo Hubalde
- Louie Vigil

Drafted to PBA

- CJ Payawal – 28th overall, 2024

== Season-by-season records ==
Note: Statistics are correct as of the end of the 2026 MPBL season.

League champions
Division champions
Qualified for playoffs
Best regular season record

Season	League	Division	Regular season						Playoffs	
Season	League	Division	Finish	Played	Wins	Losses	Win %	GB	Round	Results
Valenzuela Classic
2018; Rajah Cup	MPBL	—	4th	9	6	3	.667	2	Quarterfinals; Semifinals	won vs. Quezon City, 2–1 lost vs. Batangas City, 0–2
2018–19; Datu Cup	MPBL	North	10th	25	10	15	.400	13	Did not qualify	
Val City Carga Backload Solution
2019–20; Lakan Season	MPBL	North	10th	30	11	19	.367	15	Did not qualify	
Valenzuela XUR Homes Realty Inc.
2022	MPBL	North	6th	21	10	11	.476	11	Division quarterfinals	lost vs. San Juan, 1–2
2023	MPBL	North	15th	28	3	25	.107	23	Did not qualify	
Valenzuela Classic
2024	MPBL	North	10th	28	14	14	.500	12	Did not qualify	
Val City Magic
2025	MPBL	North	11th	29	7	22	.241	21	Did not qualify	
Valenzuela City Darkhorse
2026	MPBL	North	10th	25	10	15	.400	13	Clinched play-in, did not qualify	
Regular season record				195	71	124	.364		2 playoff appearances	
Playoff record				7	2	5	.286		0 finals appearances	
Cumulative record				202	73	129	.361		0 championships	
