= Bataan Risers =

Professional basketball team in Bataan, Philippines

- 2026 Bataan Risers season
- League: MPBL
- Founded: 2018; 8 years ago
- History: Bataan Defenders; 2018; Bataan Risers; 2018–present
- Arena: Bataan People's Center; Orion Sports Complex
- Location: Bataan
- Team colors
- Main sponsor: Camaya Coast
- Head coach: Goody Ilagan

The 1Bataan Risers, more commonly known as the Bataan Risers, are a Filipino professional basketball team based in the province of Bataan. The team competes in the Maharlika Pilipinas Basketball League (MPBL) as a member of the league's North Division. The team splits its home games between Bataan People's Center in Balanga and Orion Sports Complex in Orion.

The Bataan franchise began play in 2018 as one of the MPBL's charter teams, originally going by the Bataan Defenders before switching to its current name the following season. Bataan also fielded a team in 3x3 basketball in the Chooks-to-Go Pilipinas 3x3 and has also participated in the 2019 FIBA 3x3 World Tour as the Balanga Chooks.

The team made the playoffs in its first four seasons in the league and held the league's best record in the 2018–19 season under homegrown player Gary David and coach Jojo Lastimosa.

The Risers are one of four teams based in Central Luzon. Since its founding, the team is owned by the Provincial Government of Bataan. The team is also sponsored by Camaya Coast, a Bataan-based residential development, hence the team is also known as the 1Bataan Risers–Camaya Coast.

== History ==
=== 2018–2020: The Gary David era ===
Bataan joined the Maharlika Pilipinas Basketball League as one of the ten charter teams for the league's inaugural season. The Defenders were one of two Central Luzon teams at the time, the other being the Bulacan Kuyas. In their inaugural season, as the Bataan Defenders, the team barely made the playoffs as it shared a 2–7 record with the Imus Bandera, but was able to clinch the last spot as they beat Imus in their head-to-head matchup. The team was swept in the Quarterfinals to the eventual champion Batangas City Athletics.

For the 2018–19 season, the team changed its name to the Bataan Risers. Coincidentally, that season saw the team rise to the league's best record that season with a record of 23–2. After sweeping the Caloocan Supremos in the First Round, they would fall in an upset against the Manila Stars in the Division Semifinals.

In the 2019–20 season, Bataan made the playoffs for the third consecutive season but lost to the Pampanga Giant Lanterns in the First Round.

=== 2022–present: The post-David era ===
The team then opted out of participating in the 2021 Invitational before returning in 2022. During the 2022 season, all of the team's home games were placed at Orion Sports Complex in Orion. where they made the playoffs for a fourth consecutive year, but once again lost to Pampanga in the First Round.

In the 2023 season, Bataan returned to the Bataan People's Center. It also saw the team host that season's All-Star Game. Bataan's race to the playoffs has been close, but unfortunately, they finished the season one game below .500 with a 13–15 record. Placing ninth in the North Division, Bataan missed the playoffs for the first time in the team's history, leaving the Batangas City Embassy Chill as the only founding member to never miss the playoffs.

In the 2024 season, despite keeping their previous all-stars in Arvie Bringas and Yzes Sazon, the Risers only recorded nine wins in 28 games and placing 12th in the North Division. This resulted in the team's worst season since 2018.

== Home venues ==
The Bataan franchise used the Bataan People's Center as their home venue in every season they played in except 2022, when they exclusively used the Orion Sports Complex (also referred to as Kamalig Sports Complex), which they would later utilize in 2024.

Venue	Location	2018	2018–19	2019–20	2022	2023	2024	2025	2026
Bataan People's Center	Balanga, Bataan	✓	✓	✓	✗	✓	✓	✓	✓
Orion Sports Complex	Orion, Bataan	✗	✗	✗	✓	✗	✓	✓	✓

== Personnel ==
=== Current roster ===
Bataan Risers roster
Players

Pos.	No.	Name	Height	Weight	DOB	From
F	0	Miguel Corteza	6 ft 4 in (1.93 m)		1998–02–23	St. Benilde
G	1	Robbi Darang	5 ft 9 in (1.75 m)		1999–02–16	Diliman College
F	2	Carl Bringas	6 ft 3 in (1.91 m)		2000–09–02	TUP
G	3	Alfred Flores	5 ft 8 in (1.73 m)		2000–12–15	Immaculada Concepcion
F	4	Omar Larupay	6 ft 2 in (1.88 m)			Lyceum
G	7	Hubert Cani	5 ft 11 in (1.80 m)		1995–12–09	Far Eastern
G	8	Rey Joey Barcuma	6 ft 1 in (1.85 m)			UPHSD
G/F	9	Jeff Santos	6 ft 0 in (1.83 m)		1996–03–04	Lyceum
F	11	Rhaffy Octobre	6 ft 4 in (1.93 m)	185 lb (84 kg)	1992–01–27	Visayas
F	12	Dante Paguio Jr. (HG)	6 ft 2 in (1.88 m)		1992–06–07	New Era University
G	13	Gary David (HG)	6 ft 2 in (1.88 m)	180 lb (82 kg)	1978–07–13	Lyceum
F/C	14	Alex Ramos	6 ft 4 in (1.93 m)		1994–07–31	TIP
F	16	Hance Lleva	6 ft 2 in (1.88 m)			Philippine Christian
G	18	Edrian Mark Ramirez	5 ft 11 in (1.80 m)		2000–01–07	Immaculada Concepcion
C	21	Christian Balagasay (HG)	6 ft 5 in (1.96 m)		1996–10–28	Letran
G/F	22	Yves Sazon (HG)	6 ft 1 in (1.85 m)		1995–05–23	Philippine Christian
F	23	Joshua Gallano	6 ft 2 in (1.88 m)		1999–09–23	Olivarez
F/C	27	Chris Javier	6 ft 5 in (1.96 m)	200 lb (91 kg)	1992–12–06	UE
F	28	Chito Jaime (HG)	6 ft 4 in (1.93 m)	200 lb (91 kg)	1983–10–21	AMA
F	39	Jamil Gabawan (HG)	6 ft 3 in (1.91 m)		1990–03–19	Letran
F	45	Mitchelle Maynes	6 ft 4 in (1.93 m)		1996–03–28	UB

Coaches

Head coach

- Goody Ilagan

Assistant coach(es)

- Myk Saguiguit
- Al Vergara
- Louie Cortina
- Frederick Francisco
- Prinz Cruz
- Marvin Molines
- Erwin Lozada

Team manager

- Gary Palmero

Legend

- (HG) Homegrown
- (FF) Filipino-foreigner
- (EA) EASL player
- (RS) Reserve player
- (S) Suspended
- Injured

- Roster – via Genius Sports
Updated as of: June 22, 2026

=== Head coaches ===
Bataan Risers head coaches
#	Name	Start	End	Achievements	Ref.
1	Jay Sierra	2018	2018	—	
2	Kerwin McCoy	2018	2018	—	
3	Jojo Lastimosa	2018	2019	Best regular season record (2018–19)	
4	Jong Uichico	2019	2019	—	
5	Jonas Villanueva	2019	2020	—	
6	JR Villanueva	2022	2022	—	
7	Ricky Dandan	2022	2023	—	
8	Alex Callueng	2023	2023	—	
9	Rene Baena	2024	2024	—	
10	Goody Ilagan	2024	current	—	

== Notable players ==
=== MPBL All-Star Day ===
All-Star selections

- Gary David – 2019
- Alfred Batino – 2020
- Arvie Bringas – 2022
- Yves Sazon – 2023

All-Star Game head coaches

- Jojo Lastimosa – 2019

Pre-game event winners

- Gary David – Three-Point Shootout (2019)
- Byron Villarias – Two-Ball Challenge (2019)
- Pamboy Raymundo – Two-Ball Challenge (2019)

=== PBA players ===
Ex-PBA players

- Christian Balagasay
- Robby Celiz
- Gary David
- Alfonzo Gotladera
- Chito Jaime
- Chris Javier
- Reed Juntilla
- Leo Najorda
- Pamboy Raymundo
- Jai Reyes
- Byron Villarias

Drafted to PBA

- Sean Manganti – 8th overall, 2019
- Leonard Santillan – 5th overall, season 46
- Alvin Pasaol – 9th overall, season 46
- Anton Asistio – 22nd overall, season 46
- Robbi Darang – 48th overall, season 49

== Season-by-season records ==
Note: Statistics are correct as of the end of the 2026 MPBL season.

MPBL champions	Division champions	Playoff berth

Season	League	Division	Regular season						Playoffs	
Season	League	Division	Finish	Played	Wins	Losses	Win %	GB	Round	Results
Bataan Defenders
2018	MPBL	—	8th	9	2	7	.222	6	Quarterfinals	lost vs. Batangas City, 0–2
Bataan Risers
2018–19	MPBL	North	1st	25	23	2	.920	—	Division quarterfinals Division semifinals	won vs. Caloocan, 2–0 lost vs. Manila, 1–2
2019–20	MPBL	North	5th	30	20	10	.667	6	Division quarterfinals	lost vs. Pampanga, 0–2
2022	MPBL	North	5th	21	13	8	.619	8	Division quarterfinals	lost vs. Pampanga, 1–2
2023	MPBL	North	9th	28	13	15	.464	13	Did not qualify	
2024	MPBL	North	12th	28	9	19	.321	17	Did not qualify	
2025	MPBL	North	9th	29	13	16	.448	15	Clinched play-in; did not qualify playoffs	
2026	MPBL	North	7th	25	11	14	.440	12	Division quarterfinals	lost vs. San Juan, 0–2
Regular season record				195	104	91	.533		5 playoff appearances	
Playoff record				14	4	10	.286		0 finals appearances	
Cumulative record				209	108	101	.517		0 championships	
