= Navotas Clutch =

Amateur basketball team in Navotas, Philippines

- League: MPBL (2018–2020)
- Founded: 2018
- Dissolved: 2020
- History: Navotas Clutch; 2018–2019; Navotas Uni-Pak Sardines; 2019–2020
- Arena: Navotas Sports Complex
- Location: Navotas
- Team colors

The Navotas Clutch is a Philippine professional basketball team based in Navotas. The team competes in the Maharlika Pilipinas Basketball League (MPBL) from 2018 to 2020 and played its home games at Navotas Sports Complex. The team was known as the Navotas Uni-Pak Sardines during its final season.

The team joined the league as a founding member for the 2018 season. The team departed after the 2019–20 season, and as of 2026 is the only founding team that remains inactive.

== History ==
Logo of the Navotas Uni-Pak Sardines used during its last season from 2019 to 2020.

The Navotas Clutch joined the Maharlika Pilipinas Basketball League as one of ten charter teams during its inaugural season. The team made the playoffs that season, but lost to the Muntinlupa Cagers in the quarterfinals. In the 2018–19 season, the team once again made the playoffs, but once again lost in the first round to the San Juan Knights.

The team changed its name to the Navotas Uni-Pak Sardines for the 2019-20 season, but ended up with a record of 7-22, the second-worst in the Northern Division. As of the 2023 season, Navotas is the only charter team that is currently inactive in the league.

== Personnel ==
=== Head coaches ===
Navotas Clutch/Uni-Pak Sardines head coaches
#	Name	Start	End	Achievements	Ref.
1	Elvis Tolentino	2018	2018	—	
2	Richie Ticzon	2018	2019	—	
3	Gabby Severino	2018–19	2019–20	—	

=== Notable players ===
Navotas Clutch/Uni-Pak Sardines notable players
Player	Position	Tenure	Awards	All-Star
Marlon Gomez		2018–2019	—	1 (2019)
Jai Reyes		2018–2019	1x All-MPBL Second Team (2019)	—
Marwin Taywan		2019–2020	—	1 (2020)

== Season-by-season records ==
Note: Statistics are correct as of the end of the 2019–20 MPBL season.

League champions
Division champions
Qualified for playoffs
Best regular season record

Season	League	Division	Regular season						Playoffs	
Season	League	Division	Finish	Played	Wins	Losses	Win %	GB	Round	Results
Navotas Clutch
2018; Rajah Cup	MPBL	—	6th	9	5	4	.556	3	Quarterfinals	lost vs. Muntinlupa, 0–2
2018–19; Rajah Cup	MPBL	North	6th	25	12	13	.480	11	Division quarterfinals	lost vs. San Juan, 0–2
Navotas Uni-Pak Sardines
2019–20; Lakan Season	MPBL	North	15th	30	7	22	.667	18.5	Did not qualify	
Did not participate from 2022 to 2026
Regular season record				63	24	39	.381		2 playoff appearances	
Playoff record				4	0	4	.000		0 finals appearances	
Cumulative record				67	24	43	.358		0 championships	
