= Bulacan Kuyas =

Professional basketball team in Bulacan, Philippines

- 2026 Bulacan Kuyas season
- Division: North Division
- League: MPBL
- Founded: 2017; 9 years ago
- History: Bulacan Kuyas; 2018–present
- Arena: Bulacan Capitol Gymnasium; Malolos Sports and Convention Center; Baliwag Star Arena; Victory Coliseum
- Location: Bulacan
- Team colors
- Head coach: Allan Salangsang

The Bulacan Kuyas are a Filipino professional basketball team based in Baliwag, Bulacan. The team competes in the Maharlika Pilipinas Basketball League (MPBL) as a member of the league's North Division. The team most recently played its home games at Baliwag Star Arena.

The Kuyas were founded as one of the MPBL's charter teams in its inaugural season and are currently one of four teams based in Central Luzon. The team took a leave of absence from the league in 2022 before returning the following season. They have also taken part in the Chooks-to-Go Pilipinas 3x3.

== History ==
=== Founding ===
The Bulacan Kuyas are among the ten charter teams featured in the inaugural season of the Maharlika Pilipinas Basketball League. They were also the champions of the pre-season tournament the league held prior to the season. Throughout the 2018 season, the team played their home games at the Bulacan Capitol Gymnasium in Malolos. The team inked a partnership with the Ligo Sardines for the 2018 season.

=== 2018–2021: The Taganas era ===
In their first season, Bulacan were one of three teams with a 6–3 record and claimed the second seed with a tiebreaker on point differential. The team, however, would fall in an upset against the Panañaque Patriots in the Quarterfinals.

Entering the 2018–19 season, the team signed a deal with Mighty Sports to become the team's new major sponsor. The team once again made the playoffs, but once again lost in the First Round to the Manila Stars. Then in the 2019–20 season, they made the playoffs for the third straight season, but lost to the Makati Super Crunch. After competing in the 2021 Invitational, the team opted out of the 2022 season.

=== 2023–present: Return and sudden decline ===
The team would make a return in 2023. Since then, the team has failed to return to their amateur era form. After starting the 2023 season 6–4, the team went on to win only one out of their remaining 18 games to finish the season 7–21. In 2024, the Kuyas only won two games out of 28 and ended up as the worst team in the North Division that season.

== Team identity ==
The team is named after former Bulacan First District Representative Jose Antonio Sy-Alvarado, whose nickname is "Kuya". He served as the team's owner and backer during its foundation.

During the team's first three seasons, it used a color scheme that primarily revolves around the color pink, with purple or blue-green as the secondary color. When the team returned in 2023, the primary color was switched to green.

== Home venues ==
Most of the Bulacan Kuyas' home games are played at the Bulacan Capitol Gymnasium alongside secondary venues Baliwag Star Arena and Malolos Sports and Convention Center. In 2023, the team played all of their home games at Baliwag Star Arena.

In 2026, the team returned to play their home games in Malolos and Baliwag.

On May 15, 2026, the team played its home game at the Victory Coliseum in San Rafael.

Venue	Location	2018	2018–19	2019–20	2022	2023	2024	2025	2026
Bulacan Capitol Gymnasium	Malolos, Bulacan	✓	✓	✓	DNP	✗	✗	✗	✗
Malolos Sports and Convention Center	Malolos, Bulacan	✗	✗	✓	DNP	✗	✗	✗	✓
Baliwag Star Arena	Baliwag, Bulacan	✗	✓	✓	DNP	✓	✗	✗	✓
Victory Coliseum	San Rafael, Bulacan	✗	✗	✗	DNP	✗	✗	✗	✓

== Current roster ==
Bulacan Kuyas roster
Players

Pos.	No.	Name	Height	Weight	DOB	From
G	1	Mart Barrera	6 ft 2 in (1.88 m)			José Rizal
G	2	Joseph Barredo	5 ft 7 in (1.70 m)			RTU
G	3	CJ Ibe (HG)	5 ft 9 in (1.75 m)			RTU
G	4	Jeff Lorenzo	5 ft 8 in (1.73 m)			De La Salle Araneta
G	6	Kyle Salen				STI
G	7	William Sy	5 ft 8 in (1.73 m)		2002–12–22	Lyceum
G	8	Penny Limpo (HG)	6 ft 2 in (1.88 m)			Centro Escolar
G	10	Airohn Paul Acop (HG)	5 ft 11 in (1.80 m)		2000-07-31	BSAU
F	11	Kenneth Castillo (HG)	6 ft 3 in (1.91 m)		2003-06-26	LCCM
G	12	Joshua Moralejo (HG)	5 ft 10 in (1.78 m)		2000–04–20	Lyceum
G	13	Andrei Acop (HG)	5 ft 11 in (1.80 m)		2002-06-02	Arellano
F	15	Vince Sarmiento	6 ft 3 in (1.91 m)		2002-04-08	José Rizal
F	16	Jerick Sumampong (HG)	6 ft 5 in (1.96 m)			Mapúa
G	19	Jose Gabriel Espinosa (HG)	6 ft 1 in (1.85 m)			Bulacan State
C	20	Kent Montalvo (HG)	6 ft 5 in (1.96 m)			Bulacan State
F	21	Jeremy Cruz (HG)	6 ft 3 in (1.91 m)			UE
G	23	JP Magalong (FF)	6 ft 0 in (1.83 m)		1999-09-03	St. Clare
G	24	Marz Rupinta (HG)	6 ft 0 in (1.83 m)			Bulacan State
G	25	Herrald Benedictos (HG)	6 ft 2 in (1.88 m)			Bulacan State
G	26	Jonathan Medina	6 ft 0 in (1.83 m)			José Rizal
F/C	31	Marj De Leon	6 ft 4 in (1.93 m)			José Rizal
F	35	Eugene Gonzales	6 ft 3 in (1.91 m)			Letran
F	44	Jaspher Delos Reyes (HG)	6 ft 0 in (1.83 m)			DLSU–Dasma
G/F	66	Mico Dizon (HG)	6 ft 2 in (1.88 m)			Centro Escolar
F/C	73	Gyllien Esguerra	6 ft 6 in (1.98 m)			José Rizal

Coaches

Head coach

- Allan Salangsang

Assistant coach(es)

- Pao Pagkalinawan
- Jervi Glorioso
- Rafong Tumale
- Char Lee
- Jeromy Noarin
- Terence Reyes
- Jhonn Rivera
- Joshua Benedick Tan

Team manager

- Rolly Barredo

Legend

- (HG) Homegrown
- (FF) Filipino-foreigner
- (EA) EASL player
- (RS) Reserve player
- (S) Suspended
- Injured

- Roster – via Genius Sports
Updated as of: June 22, 2026

=== Head coaches ===
Bulacan Kuyas head coaches
#	Name	Start	End	Achievements	Ref.
1	Ogie Gumatay	2018	2018	—	
2	Chris Baluyot	2018	2018	—	
3	Britt Reroma	2018	2019	—	
4	Kerwin McCoy	2019	2021	—	
5	Ralph Emerson Rivera	2021	2021	—	
6	Alvin Grey	2023	2023	—	
7	Jerry Codiñera	2023	2023	—	
8	Joseph Mabagos	2023	2023	—	
9	Jonathan Reyes	2024	2024	—	
10	Elgin Espina	2025	2025	—	
11	Terence Reyes	2025	2025	—	
12	Allan Salangsang	2026	current	—	

== Notable players ==
=== MPBL All-Star Day ===
All-Star selections

- Jay-R Taganas – 2019, 2020
- Renzo Alcoriza – 2023

Pre-game event winners

- Lester Alvarez – Three-Point Shootout (2020)

=== PBA players ===
Ex-PBA players

- Lester Alvarez
- Marlou Aquino
- Bryan Faundo
- Paulo Hubalde
- James Martinez
- Ogie Menor
- Hans Thiele

== Season-by-season records ==
Note: Statistics are correct as of the end of the 2025 MPBL season.

League champions
Division champions
Qualified for playoffs
Best regular season record

Season	League	Division	Regular season						Playoffs	
Season	League	Division	Finish	Played	Wins	Losses	Win %	GB	Round	Results
Bulacan Kuyas
2018; Rajah Cup	MPBL	—	2nd	9	6	3	.667	2	Quarterfinals	lost vs. Parañaque, 1–2
2018–19; Datu Cup	MPBL	North	5th	25	14	11	.560	9	Division quarterfinals	lost vs. Manila, 0–2
2019–20; Lakan Season	MPBL	North	6th	30	19	11	.633	7	Division quarterfinals	lost vs. Makati, 0–2
Did not participate in 2022
2023	MPBL	North	12th	28	7	21	.250	19	Did not qualify	
2024	MPBL	North	14th	28	2	26	.071	14	Did not qualify	
2025	MPBL	North	15th	29	3	26	.103	25	Did not qualify	
2026	MPBL	North	11th	25	6	19	.240	17	Did not qualify	
Regular season record				177	57	120	.322		3 playoff appearances	
Playoff record				7	1	6	.143		0 finals appearances	
Cumulative record				165	58	126	.315		0 championships	
