= 2021 MPBL finals =

Championship series of the Maharlika Pilipinas Basketball League's 2019–20 season

| Team | Coach | Wins |
|---|---|---|
| Davao Occidental Tigers | Don Dulay | 3 |
| San Juan Knights | Randy Alcantara | 1 |
- Dates: March 17–21, 2021
- MVP: Mark Yee
- Northern finals: San Juan def. Makati, 2–1
- Southern finals: Davao Occidental def. Basilan, 2–1

The 2021 MPBL finals, originally called the 2020 MPBL finals and also known as the MPBL Lakan Cup finals, was the championship series of the Maharlika Pilipinas Basketball League's (MPBL) 2019–20 MPBL season, and the conclusion of the season's playoffs. Due to the COVID-19 pandemic, the league held the entire series in a bubble in Subic, Zambales. In the best-of-five playoff that saw a rematch of the previous season's finals, the South Division champion Davao Occidental Tigers beat the North Division champion San Juan Knights, 3–1, as they were crowned the league's third champions. Mark Yee was also named the season's Finals MVP.

Both teams finished with the first seed in their respective divisions with a record of 26–4, but San Juan beat Davao Occidental in their regular season match-up. As of 2023, it is the last finals appearance for both teams.

== Background ==
The league stopped play on March 11, 2020, midway through the division finals, after the outbreak of the COVID-19 pandemic spread throughout the country, thus shelving the remaining games of the playoffs. A year later, after the league got an approval from the government and the IATF, allowing the league to resume play inside a bubble starting March 10, which featured the final games of the division finals. The series did not feature a home-and-away format due to the threat of the ongoing pandemic. All games were played at the Subic Bay Gymnasium, the venue of the sepak takraw event that was used in the 2019 Southeast Asian Games.

=== San Juan Knights ===
The San Juan Knights entered the season as the defending champions, winning the 2019 MPBL finals against the Davao Occidental Tigers. They started the season with a 10-game winning streak and eventually finishing the regular season with a 26–4 win-loss card to hold the league's best record, a tiebreaker that was broken as the Knights have defeated the Tigers in the regular-season game. In the playoffs, they easily defeated 8th-seeded Pasay Voyagers and 4th-seeded Pampanga Giant Lanterns in the first two rounds, both in just two games. The division finals saw the 3rd-seeded Makati Super Crunch, who have qualified for their first division finals appearance. Both teams split the first two games, and the series went to a decider. The decider game three saw only 5 players play from the Makati side, as the Knights overpowered the other team in a record-setting match, 131–54, and eventually clinch the North Division championship for the second consecutive season and advance for their second straight MPBL finals appearance.

=== Davao Occidental Tigers ===
The Davao Occidental Tigers entered the season as the runners-up, losing to the San Juan Knights in the 2019 MPBL finals. They have started the season with a 10–1 win-loss record and eventually finishing the regular season with a 26–4 win-loss record, identical to that of the Knights, but only held the second-best record in the league as they fell to San Juan in the regular-season matchup. In the first round, the team were pushed to the limits by Bicol Volcanoes, forcing a decider, and eventually won the series in three games. The division semifinals saw themselves making an easy sweep of the Zamboanga Family's Brand Sardines in two games, and facing the Basilan Steel in the division finals. The Steel shocked the Tigers in the first game, and the Tigers even the series at one-apiece before the stoppage, forcing a decider. But the decider game three was not played and gave a default win for the team as the league gave an ultimatum to the Basilan team that should another member of the Basilan team catch the virus, a default win would be awarded. On March 16, the league gave the default 2–0 win to the Tigers to become the two-time South Division Champions to advance to their second straight MPBL finals appearance, setting up a finals rematch against the very team in San Juan Knights.

== Road to the finals ==
| San Juan Knights (Northern Division Champion) | | Davao Occidental Tigers (Southern Division Champion) |
|---|---|---|
| Pos / Team / Pld / W / L / PCT / GB / Qualification; 1 / San Juan Knights / 30 / 26 / 4 / .867 / — / Playoffs; 2 / Manila Stars / 30 / 25 / 5 / .833 / 1 / Playoffs; 3 / Makati Super Crunch / 30 / 22 / 8 / .733 / 4 / Playoffs; 4 / Pampanga Giant Lanterns / 30 / 21 / 9 / .700 / 5 / Playoffs; 5 / Bataan Risers / 30 / 20 / 10 / .667 / 6 / Playoffs; 6 / Bulacan Kuyas / 30 / 19 / 11 / .633 / 7 / Playoffs; 7 / Pasig Sta. Lucia Realtors / 30 / 18 / 12 / .600 / 8 / Playoffs; 8 / Pasay Voyagers / 30 / 17 / 13 / .567 / 9 / Playoffs; 9 / Caloocan Supremos / 30 / 16 / 14 / .533 / 10; 10 / Valenzuela Classic / 30 / 11 / 19 / .367 / 15; 11 / Nueva Ecija Rice Vanguards / 30 / 10 / 20 / .333 (Note: Nueva Ecija wins tiebreaker over Quezon City by head-to-head victory.) / 16; 12 / Quezon City Capitals / 30 / 10 / 20 / .333 / 16; 13 / Marikina Shoemasters / 30 / 8 / 22 / .267 (Note: Marikina wins tiebreaker over Parañaque by head-to-head victory.) / 18; 14 / Parañaque Patriots / 30 / 8 / 22 / .267 / 18; 15 / Navotas Uni-Pak Sardines / 29 / 7 / 22 / .241 / 18.5; 16 / Rizal Golden Coolers / 29 / 6 / 23 / .207 / 19.5; Source: Standings; Notes: 1st seed in the North, best league record | Regular season | Pos / Team / Pld / W / L / PCT / GB / Qualification; 1 / Davao Occidental Tigers / 30 / 26 / 4 / .867 / — / Playoffs; 2 / Bacoor City Strikers / 30 / 24 / 6 / .800 / 2 / Playoffs; 3 / Basilan Steel / 30 / 20 / 10 / .667 / 6 / Playoffs; 4 / Batangas City Athletics / 30 / 19 / 11 / .633 / 7 / Playoffs; 5 / Zamboanga Family's Brand Sardines / 30 / 18 / 12 / .600 (Note: Zamboanga (1.071), Iloilo (0.976), and General Santos (0.960) are ranked based on head-to-head point quotient.) / 8 / Playoffs; 6 / Iloilo United Royals / 30 / 18 / 12 / .600 / 8 / Playoffs; 7 / GenSan Warriors / 30 / 18 / 12 / .600 / 8 / Playoffs; 8 / Bicol Volcanoes / 30 / 16 / 14 / .533 / 10 / Playoffs; 9 / Cebu Casino Ethyl Alcohol / 30 / 15 / 15 / .500 / 11; 10 / Biñan City Luxxe White / 30 / 12 / 18 / .400 / 14; 11 / Bacolod Master Sardines / 30 / 11 / 19 / .367 / 15; 12 / Mindoro Tamaraws / 30 / 9 / 21 / .300 / 17; 13 / Muntinlupa Cagers / 30 / 7 / 23 / .233 / 19; 14 / Imus Bandera / 30 / 6 / 24 / .200 / 20; 15 / Sarangani Marlins / 30 / 1 / 29 / .033 / 25; Source: Standings; Notes: 1st seed in the South, 2nd best league record |
| Defeated 8th-seeded Pasay Voyagers, 2–0 | First Round | Defeated 8th-seeded Bicol Volcanoes, 2–1 |
| Defeated 4th-seeded Pampanga Giant Lanterns, 2–0 | Division semifinals | Defeated 5th-seeded Zamboanga Family's Brand Sardines, 2–0 |
| Defeated 3rd-seeded Makati Super Crunch, 2–1 | Division finals | Defeated 3rd-seeded Basilan Steel, 2–1 |

=== Head-to-head matchup ===
S+A
Liga

January 18, 2020
06:30 pm

Boxscore

| Davao Occidental Tigers | 65–84 | San Juan Knights |
Scoring by quarter: 13–26, 18–23, 20–14, 14–21
| Pts: Yvan Ludovice, Mark Yee 14 each Rebs: Yee, Robles 14 each Asts: June Kenneth Mocon 7 | | Pts: Orlan Wamar 15; Rebs: Larry Rodriguez 8 Asts: Andrew Estrella 6 |

USeP Gymnasium and Cultural Center, Davao City

== Series summary ==
Due to the series being held in a bubble, no team had homecourt advantage, as all games were played at the Subic Bay Gymnasium.

| Game | Date | Result | | | Venue |
|---|---|---|---|---|---|
| 1 | March 17 | San Juan Knights | 75–77 (OT) (0–1) | Davao Occidental Tigers | Subic Bay Gymnasium |
| 2 | March 18 | San Juan Knights | 70–65 (1–1) | Davao Occidental Tigers | Subic Bay Gymnasium |
| 3 | March 20 | San Juan Knights | 58–66 (1–2) | Davao Occidental Tigers | Subic Bay Gymnasium |
| 4 | March 21 | San Juan Knights | 88–89 (OT) (1–3) | Davao Occidental Tigers | Subic Bay Gymnasium |

== Game summaries ==
=== Game 1 ===
A2Z
Facebook

March 17, 2021
4:00 pm

Boxscore

| San Juan Knights | 75–77 (OT) | Davao Occidental Tigers |
Scoring by quarter: 15–15, 15–15, 19–13, 19–25, Overtime: 7–9
| Pts: Mike Ayonayon 27; Rebs: Jhonard Clarito 11; Asts: Mike Ayonayon 5 | | Pts: Emman Calo, Mark Yee 15 each Rebs: Billy Ray Robles 11; Asts: Billy Ray Robles 4 |
Davao Occiental leads series, 1–0

Subic Bay Gymnasium, Subic
Referees: J. Castroverde, E. Avis, R. Brila

=== Game 2 ===
A2Z
Facebook

March 18, 2021
4:00 pm

Boxscore

| San Juan Knights | 70–65 | Davao Occidental Tigers |
Scoring by quarter: 15–15, 23–22, 14–13, 18–15
| Pts: John Wilson 17; Rebs: Jhonard Clarito 11; Asts: Mike Ayonayon 9 | | Pts: Emman Calo 26; Rebs: Mark Yee, Billy Ray Robles 10 each Asts: Mark Yee, Yvan Ludovice 3 each |
Series tied, 1–1

Subic Bay Gymnasium, Subic
Referees: B. Estroga, R. Brila, G. Villanueva

=== Game 3 ===
A2Z
Facebook

March 20, 2021
3:00 pm

Boxscore

| San Juan Knights | 58–66 | Davao Occidental Tigers |
Scoring by quarter: 14–15, 13–26, 15–11, 16–14
| Pts: Mike Ayonayon 16; Rebs: John Wilson 9 Asts: Mike Ayonayon 3 | | Pts: Billy Ray Robles 13; Rebs: Mark Yee 11; Asts: Yvan Ludovice, Bonbon Custodio 3 each |
Davao Occidental leads series, 2–1

Subic Bay Gymnasium, Subic

=== Game 4 ===
A2Z
Facebook

March 21, 2021
4:00 pm

Boxscore

| San Juan Knights | 88–89 (OT) | Davao Occidental Tigers |
Scoring by quarter: 18–24, 13–16, 29–16, 20–24, Overtime: 8–9
| Pts: Larry Rodriguez 19; Rebs: Jhonard Clarito 11; Asts: Carlos Isit Jr. 10 | | Pts: Emman Calo 22; Rebs: Mark Yee 12; Asts: Billy Ray Robles 6 |
Davao Occidental wins series, 3–1

Subic Bay Gymnasium, Subic

== Broadcast notes ==
This marked the third and currently final year of ABS-CBN's broadcast rights of the MPBL finals, at least on television. Due to the expiration of the network's franchise, the series was broadcast on A2Z and Kapamilya Channel on television, the former coming as part of a blocktime partnership between ABS-CBN and ZOE Broadcasting Network. The finals was also streamed on the league's official Facebook page.
