= List of 2024 MPBL season transactions =

This is a list of transactions that have taken place during the 2023–24 MPBL off-season and the 2024 MPBL season.

== Coaching changes ==
=== Off-season ===
Team	Departing coach	Incoming coach
Abra Weavers	—	Jonathan Banal
Bacolod City of Smiles	Vincent Salvador	Alex Cabagnot
Bataan Risers	Alex Callueng	Rene Baena
Bicolandia Oragons	Jason Santiago	Raymond Valenzona
Biñan Tatak Gel	Nath Gregorio	Boyet Fernandez
Bulacan Kuyas	Joseph Mabagos	Jonathan Reyes
Caloocan Batang Kankaloo	Robert Sison	Alexander Angeles
Davao Occidental Tigers	Don Dulay	Manu Iñigo
Imus Agimat	Jinino Manansala	Jun Da Jose
Manila Batang Sampaloc	Bimbot Anquilo	Gabby Severino
Marikina Shoemasters	Elvis Tolentino	Rysal Castro
Mindoro Tamaraws	Jonathan Reyes	JR Cawaling
Muntinlupa Cagers	Aldrin Morante	Mixson Ramos
Nueva Ecija Rice Vanguards	Jerson Cabiltes	Don Dulay
Pampanga Giant Lanterns	Dennis Pineda	Frederick Dimatulac
Pangasinan Heatwaves	—	Jerson Cabiltes
Rizal Golden Coolers	Jonathan Banal	Ralph Rivera
South Cotabato Warriors	Rich Alvarez	Elvis Tolentino

== Player movements ==
=== Trades ===
June
June 26	To Nueva Ecija Rice Vanguards: Ed Daquioag; Jeff Javillonar; Chester Saldua	To Pangasinan Heatwaves: Nat Cosejo; Michael Juico; JP Maguliano

=== Transfers ===
Player	New team	Former team	Ref.
Rey Mark Acuño	Bataan Risers	Quezon Huskers	
Keith Agovida	Davao Occidental Tigers	Rizal Golden Coolers	
Jayson Apolonio	Zamboanga Master Sardines	Pampanga Giant Lanterns	
RV Berjay	Iloilo United Royals	Marikina Shoemasters	
John Cantimbuhan	Manila Batang Sampaloc	Bacolod City of Smiles	
Felipe Chavez	Abra Weavers	Marikina Shoemasters	
Judel Fuentes	Quezon Huskers	Zamboanga Family's Brand Sardines	
Rodney Fuentes	Zamboanga Master Sardines	Rizal Golden Coolers	
Jayson Grimaldo	Bataan Risers	Zamboanga Family's Brand Sardines	
Chito Jaime	Zamboanga Master Sardines	Bacoor City Strikers	
Jammer Jamito	South Cotabato Warriors	Bacoor City Strikers	
Aaron Jeruta	Iloilo United Royals	Bacoor City Strikers	
Mitchelle Maynes	Bataan Risers	Pampanga Giant Lanterns	
Rhaffy Octobre	Bataan Risers	Batangas City Embassy Chill	
Jayboy Solis	Zamboanga Master Sardines	Parañaque Patriots	
Jason Strait	Zamboanga Master Sardines	Marikina Shoemasters	
Mac Tallo	Davao Occidental Tigers	Abra Weavers	
Joshua Torralba	Manila Batang Sampaloc	Goyang Sono Skygunners (KBL)	
John Wilson	Nueva Ecija Rice Vanguards	South Cotabato Warriors	
Mark Yee	Abra Weavers	Parañaque Patriots	

=== From college ===
Denotes Special Guest Licensee during the previous season

Player	MPBL team	College team	Association	Ref.
Joshua Abastillas	Bataan Risers	Arellano Chiefs	NCAA	
Rey Barcuma	Zamboanga Master Sardines	Perpetual Altas	NCAA	
Carl Bringas	Bataan Risers	TUP Gray Hawks	NAASCU	
CJ Cansino	Iloilo United Royals	UP Fighting Maroons	UAAP	
Jason Credo	Iloilo United Royals	Ateneo Blue Eagles	UAAP	
Ljay Gonzales	Quezon Huskers	FEU Tamaraws	UAAP	
Will Gozum	Quezon Huskers	Benilde Blazers	NCAA	
Cyrus Llarena	Bicolandia Oragons	San Beda Red Lions	NCAA	
Mark Nonoy	Iloilo United Royals	De La Salle Green Archers	UAAP	
Edrian Mark Ramirez	Bataan Risers	ICC Blue Hawks	ISAA	
Jeremiah Soriano	Bataan Risers	UE Red Warriors	UAAP	

==== Special Guest Licensees ====
NOTE: Effective June 1, 2024, the association will no longer allow its Special Guest Licensees to play in professional leagues.

Player	MPBL team	College team	Association	Ref.
William Dimo Oftana	Sarangani Marlins	Arellano Chiefs	NCAA	
Mark Omega	Zamboanga Master Sardines	Perpetual Altas	NCAA	
Felix Eligio Villarente	Sarangani Marlins	Arellano Chiefs	NCAA	

=== From PBA ===
Player	MPBL team	PBA team	Ref.
Gab Banal	Quezon Huskers	Blackwater Bossing	
Mac Tallo	Abra Weavers	Converge FiberXers	

=== Other additions ===
Player	Team	Ref.
Justin Alfonso	Bicolandia Oragons	
Jan Formento	Bataan Risers	
Jomar Magdayag	Sarangani Marlins	
Joshua Roque	Sarangani Marlins	
Renzo Subido	Zamboanga Master Sardines	

=== Going to PBA ===
Denotes former Special Guest Licensee

Player	PBA team	MPBL team	Ref.
John Amores	NorthPort Batang Pier	Muntinlupa Cagers	
King Caralipio	Converge FiberXers	Zamboanga Family's Brand Sardines	
Kemark Cariño	Terrafirma Dyip	Nueva Ecija Rice Vanguards	
Archie Concepcion	Blackwater Bossing	Pampanga Giant Lanterns	
Sherwin Concepcion	Rain or Shine Elasto Painters	Nueva Ecija Rice Vanguards	
JL Delos Santos	Converge FiberXers	Muntinlupa Cagers	
Inand Fornilos	Converge FiberXers	Marikina Shoemasters	
Kyt Jimenez	San Miguel Beermen	GenSan Warriors	
James Kwekuteye	Blackwater Bossing	Bacoor City Strikers	
Troy Mallillin	San Miguel Beermen	Rizal Golden Coolers	
Jhan Nermal	NLEX Road Warriors	Bacoor City Strikers	
Adrian Nocum	Rain or Shine Elasto Painters	San Juan Knights	
Louie Sangalang	Terrafirma Dyip	Pampanga Giant Lanterns	
Raffy Verano	Phoenix Super LPG Fuel Masters	Quezon Huskers	
Fran Yu	NorthPort Batang Pier	San Juan Knights	
