= List of MPBL records =

This list consists of the records set in the Maharlika Pilipinas Basketball League (MPBL).

== Individual game records ==
- Quadruple-double:
  - 33 points, 13 rebounds, 11 assists, and 11 steals by Kyt Jimenez, Sarangani Marlins vs. Mindoro Tams on October 10, 2022
- Most points in a game:
  - 53 by Nic Cabañero, Biñan Tatak Gel vs. Pasig City on September 10, 2026
- Most rebounds in a game:
  - 27 by Justine Baltazar, Pampanga Giant Lanterns vs. Bataan Risers on May 30, 2023
- Most assists in a game:
  - 25 by Orlan Wamar, San Juan Knights vs. Sarangani Gripper Motorcycle Tire on September 10, 2025
- Most steals in a game:
  - 11 by Kyt Jimenez, Sarangani Marlins vs. Mindoro Tams on October 10, 2022
- Most blocks in a game:
  - 8 by Jayson Grimaldo, Batangas City Athletics vs. Cebu City Sharks on July 15, 2019
- Most three-point field goals made in a game:
  - 15 by Philip Paniamogan, Batangas City Tanduay Rum Masters vs. Cebu Classic on June 12, 2025

== Team game records ==
- Most points by a team in a game:
  - 148 by Sarangani Gripper Motorcycle Tire vs. Bulacan Kuyas on May 5, 2025
- Most assists by a team in a game:
  - 48 by Manila SV Batang Sampaloc vs. Bicolandia Oragons on August 22, 2024
- Largest margin of victory:
  - 84 by Abra Solid North Weavers (129) vs. Bacolod Masskara (45) on July 20, 2026
- Most combined points in a game:
  - 259 by Sarangani Gripper Motorcycle Tire (148) and Bulacan Kuyas (111) on May 5, 2025
- Least combined points in a game:
  - 75 by Davao Occidental Tigers (47) and Zamboanga Family's Brand Sardines (28) on March 2, 2020
- Least combined points in a half:
  - 30 by Davao Occidental Tigers (19) and Zamboanga Family's Brand Sardines (11) on March 2, 2020

== Team season records ==
- Undefeated regular seasons:
  - Nueva Ecija Rice Vanguards (21–0), 2022
- Most regular season wins:
  - 28 by the Abra Solid North Weavers, 2025
- Longest overall winning streak:
  - 36 by the Abra Solid North Weavers (26 in the regular season, 10 in the playoffs; March 24 – December 16, 2025)
- Longest regular season winning streak (single season):
  - 26 by the Abra Solid North Weavers (March 24 – September 30, 2025)
- Longest overall losing streak:
  - 29 by the Bulacan Kuyas (June 4, 2024 – May 16, 2025)
- Longest regular season losing streak (single season):
  - 25 by the Bacolod City of Smiles (April 23 – September 27, 2024)

== All-Star Game records ==
- Most points by a team in a game:
  - 126 by South All-Stars vs. North All-Stars (122) on February 13, 2020
