= 2020–21 MPBL playoffs =

Playoffs for the Maharlika Pilipinas Basketball League's 2019–20 season

MPBL Lakan Cup playoffs

Tournament details
- Country: Philippines
- Dates: February 15–March 11, 2020 (before suspension); March 10–21, 2021 (after suspension)
- Teams: 16
- Defending champions: San Juan Knights

Final positions
- Champions: Davao Occidental Tigers
- Runners-up: San Juan Knights
- Semifinalists: Makati Super Crunch; Basilan Steel

Tournament statistics
- Matches played: 35 (1 defaulted)

The 2020–21 MPBL playoffs, originally billed as the 2020 MPBL playoffs and also known as the MPBL Lakan Cup playoffs, was the postseason tournament of the Maharlika Pilipinas Basketball League's 2019–20 season, the league's third overall, and the second under the 16-team format. The postseason tournament began on February 15, 2020, and concluded on March 21, 2021, after the fourth game of the 2021 MPBL finals. The league suspended all the playoffs due to the COVID-19 outbreak on March 12, 2020. After a year of stoppage of play, the league got an approval from the IATF-EID and resumed the playoffs on March 10, 2021, inside a bubble hosted by Subic.

The 2021 MPBL finals saw the Northern Division champions San Juan Knights competed against the Southern Division champion Davao Occidental Tigers. The Tigers eventually won the championship after beating the Knights in four games, avenging their last season's finals loss in 2019. Mark Yee was named the Finals MVP for that finals series.

== Overview ==
=== Updates to playoff appearances ===
- The San Juan Knights entered the playoffs for the second consecutive season and clinched the best record in the league for the first time in team history.
- The Davao Occidental Tigers entered the playoffs for the second consecutive season and clinched the best record in the South Division for the second consecutive season.
- The Bataan Risers, Batangas City Athletics, and Bulacan Kuyas entered the playoffs for the third consecutive season.
- The Bacoor City Strikers, GenSan Warriors, Makati Super Crunch, Manila Stars, and Zamboanga Family's Brand Sardines entered the playoffs for the second consecutive season.
- The Basilan Steel, Bicol Volcanoes, Iloilo United Royals, Pampanga Giant Lanterns, Pasay Voyagers, and Pasig Sta. Lucia Realtors entered the playoffs for the first time in team history.
- The Muntinlupa Cagers, Navotas Uni-Pak Sardines, and Quezon City Capitals missed the playoffs for the first time since entering the league and making the playoffs since then.

=== Division semifinals ===
- Davao Occidental beat Zamboanga in game 1 with a score of 47–28. At just 75 points, it is the least combined points scored by both teams in a single game.
  - Zamboanga's 28 points is also least points scored by a team in a single game.
- After the first half, the score was 19–11, the 30 combined points is also the least combined points scored by both teams in a single half.

== Format ==
The top eight teams from each division advanced to the playoffs. Seeding was based on winning percentage, with tiebreaker rules applied should multiple teams have the same record. The single-elimination bracket consists of four rounds with no reseeding. The first three rounds were best-of-three series and the national finals was a best-of-five series.

During the first two rounds, two games within the same division were played in a gameday, with homecourt advantage alternating between the higher-seeded teams of each series. A traditional homecourt format was then used for the last two rounds, with the division finals using a 1-1-1 format and the national finals using a 2-2-1 format. The designated home team may not be able to play within its home locality. Should it occur, the gameday may take place elsewhere.

== Division standings ==
North Division

Pos	Team	Pld	W	L	PCT	GB	Qualification
1	San Juan Knights	30	26	4	.867	—	Playoffs
2	Manila Stars	30	25	5	.833	1	Playoffs
3	Makati Super Crunch	30	22	8	.733	4	Playoffs
4	Pampanga Giant Lanterns	30	21	9	.700	5	Playoffs
5	Bataan Risers	30	20	10	.667	6	Playoffs
6	Bulacan Kuyas	30	19	11	.633	7	Playoffs
7	Pasig Sta. Lucia Realtors	30	18	12	.600	8	Playoffs
8	Pasay Voyagers	30	17	13	.567	9	Playoffs

Source: Standings

South Division

Pos	Team	Pld	W	L	PCT	GB	Qualification
1	Davao Occidental Tigers	30	26	4	.867	—	Playoffs
2	Bacoor City Strikers	30	24	6	.800	2	Playoffs
3	Basilan Steel	30	20	10	.667	6	Playoffs
4	Batangas City Athletics	30	19	11	.633	7	Playoffs
5	Zamboanga Family's Brand Sardines	30	18	12	.600 (Note: Zamboanga (1.071), Iloilo (0.976), and General Santos (0.960) are ranked based on head-to-head point quotient.)	8	Playoffs
6	Iloilo United Royals	30	18	12	.600	8	Playoffs
7	GenSan Warriors	30	18	12	.600	8	Playoffs
8	Bicol Volcanoes	30	16	14	.533	10	Playoffs

Source: Standings

== Bracket ==
Teams in bold advanced to the next round. The numbers to the left of each team indicate the team's seeding in its division, and the numbers to the right indicate the number of games the team won in that round. Teams with home court advantage, the higher seeded team, are shown in italics.

Division quarterfinals (best-of-3)	Division semifinals (best-of-3)
N1	**San Juan**	**2**
N8	Pasay	0
N1	**San Juan**	**2**
N4	Pampanga	0
N4	**Pampanga**	**2**
N5	Bataan	0
**North Division**
N2	**Manila**	**2**
N7	Pasig	0
N2	Manila	1
N3	**Makati**	**2**
N3	**Makati**	**2**
N6	Bulacan	0
S1	**Davao Occidental**	**2**
S8	Bicol	1
S1	**Davao Occidental**	**2**
S5	Zamboanga	0
S4	Batangas City	1
S5	**Zamboanga**	**2**
**South Division**
S2	**Bacoor City**	**2**
S7	General Santos	0
S2	Bacoor City	1
S3	**Basilan**	**2**
S3	**Basilan**	**2**
S6	Iloilo	0

Division finals (best-of-3)
N1	**San Juan**	**2**
N3	Makati	1
S1	**Davao Occidental**	**2**
S3	Basilan	1

National finals (best-of-5)
N1	San Juan	1
S1	**Davao Occidental**	**3**

== First round ==
=== Northern Division ===
==== (1) San Juan Knights vs. (8) Pasay Voyagers ====
S+A
LIGA
iWant

February 15
08:30 pm

Boxscore

San Juan Knights	75–74	Pasay Voyagers
Scoring by quarter: 13–24, 15–12, 25–24, 22–14
Pts: Mike Ayonayon 15; Rebs: Rodriguez, Jhonard Clarito 9 each Asts: CJ Isit, Mike Ayonayon 5 each		Pts: Axel Inigo 24; Rebs: Dhon Reverente 11; Asts: Gio Lasquety 4

Filoil Flying V Centre, San Juan
Referees: E. Villarosa, J. Santiago, Jay Castroverde

S+A
LIGA
iWant

February 20
06:30 pm

Boxscore

Pasay Voyagers	67–74	San Juan Knights
Scoring by quarter: 10–17, 12–15, 20–12, 25–30
Pts: Dhon Reverente 23; Rebs: Dhon Reverente 14; Asts: Axel Inigo 7		Pts: Wilson 17; Rebs: Wilson 16; Asts: CJ Isit 4
San Juan wins series, 2–0

Angeles University Foundation Gym, Angeles City
Referees: Julius Tiquio, Jay Castroverde, Rommel Alcoran

This is the first playoff meeting between the Knights and the Voyagers.

==== (2) Manila Stars vs. (7) Pasig Sta. Lucia Realtors ====
S+A
LIGA
iWant

February 18
08:30 pm

Boxscore

Manila Stars	91–88	Pasig Sta. Lucia Realtors
Scoring by quarter: 19–26, 35–24, 18–18, 19–20
Pts: Lastimosa 23; Rebs: Hayes and Chris Bitoon 6 each Asts: Chris Bitoon 6		Pts: Teng 30; Rebs: Gotladera 8 Asts: Teng 5

San Andres Sports Complex, Malate, Manila
Referees: Emilio Trangia, J. Santiago, Jay Castroverde

S+A
LIGA
iWant

February 22
06:30 pm

Boxscore

Pasig Sta. Lucia Realtors	80–82	Manila Stars
Scoring by quarter: 22–14, 20–18, 22–30, 18–18
Pts: Teng 25; Rebs: Nimes 10; Asts: Nimes 4		Pts: Lastimosa 21; Rebs: Dyke 10; Asts: Bitoon 6
Manila wins series, 2–0

Malolos Sports and Convention Center, Malolos City, Bulacan

This is the first playoff meeting between the Stars and the Realtors.

==== (3) Makati Super Crunch vs. (6) Bulacan Kuyas ====
S+A
LIGA
iWant

February 18
06:30 pm

Boxscore

Makati Super Crunch	94–88	Bulacan Kuyas
Scoring by quarter: 15–24, 22–20, 25–22, 32–22
Pts: Baloria 20; Rebs: Lingganay 10; Asts: Lingganay 9		Pts: Jovit Dela Cruz and Jess Diputado 17 each Rebs: Jhan Nermal and JR Taganas 9 each Asts: Alvarez and JR Taganas 5 each
Makati leads series, 1–0

San Andres Sports Complex, Malate, Manila
Referees: Julius Tiquio, Carol Guay, Michael Quinay

S+A
LIGA
iWant

February 22
08:30 pm

Boxscore

Bulacan Kuyas	78–86	Makati Super Crunch
Scoring by quarter: 22–25, 19–14, 24–20, 21–19
Pts: S. Siruma 16; Rebs: J. dela Cruz 12; Asts: J. Alabanza 11		Pts: C. Ablaza 22; Rebs: J. Sedurifa 13; Asts: J. Apinan 7
Makati wins series, 2–0

Malolos Sports and Convention Center, Malolos City, Bulacan

This is the first playoff meeting between the Kuyas and the Super Crunch.

==== (4) Pampanga Giant Lanterns vs. (5) Bataan Risers ====
S+A
LIGA
iWant

February 15
06:30 pm

Boxscore

Pampanga Giant Lanterns	71–64	Bataan Risers
Scoring by quarter: 25–8, 23–15, 8–17, 17–22
Pts: Levi Hernandez 18; Rebs: Felix Apreku 11; Asts: Mark Cruz 6		Pts: Alfred Batino 19; Rebs: Alfred Batino 10; Asts: Gino Jumao-as 4
Pampanga leads series, 1–0

Filoil Flying V Centre, San Juan

S+A
LIGA
iWant

February 20
08:30 pm

Boxscore

Bataan Risers	80–83	Pampanga Giant Lanterns
Scoring by quarter: 13–23, 12–24, 29–21, 19–22
Pts: Reed Juntilla 22; Rebs: Alfred Batino 6 Asts: Jerome Ortega 5		Pts: Dexter Maiquez 19; Rebs: Larry Muyang 11; Asts: Mark Cruz 9
Pampanga wins series, 2–0

Angeles University Foundation Gym, Angeles City

This is the first playoff meeting between the Giant Lanterns and the Risers.

=== Southern Division ===
==== (1) Davao Occidental Tigers vs. (8) Bicol Volcanoes ====
S+A
LIGA
iWant

February 17
08:30 pm

Boxscore

Davao Occidental Tigers	77–71	Bicol Volcanoes
Scoring by quarter: 14–20, 13–16, 28–17, 22–18
Pts: Yee 20; Rebs: Yee 12; Asts: Three players 4 each		Pts: Jerome Garcia 15; Rebs: Jolas Guerrero 6 Asts: Alwyn Alday 5

Rizal Memorial College Gymnasium, Davao City
Referees: J. Ocfemia, J. Castroverde, H. Benjo Estroga

S+A
LIGA
iWant

February 21
06:30 pm

Boxscore

Bicol Volcanoes	84–81	Davao Occidental Tigers
Scoring by quarter: 21–16, 13–25, 20–22, 30–18
Pts: Alwin Alday 18; Rebs: Jerome Garcia 18; Asts: Ronjay Buenafe 14		Pts: Emanuel Calo 15; Rebs: Emanuel Calo 10; Asts: Bonbon Custodio 5

Batangas State University Gym, Batangas City

S+A
LIGA
iWant

February 26
08:30 pm

Boxscore

Davao Occidental Tigers	64–56 (OT)	Bicol Volcanoes
Scoring by quarter: 11–9, 15–15, 16–19, 14–13, Overtime: 8–0
Pts: Bonbon Custodio 14; Rebs: Jerwin Gaco 8 Asts: Emanuel Calo 4		Pts: Jefferson Ongteco 16; Rebs: Alwin Alday 9 Asts: Ronjay Buenafe 2
Davao Occidental wins series, 2–1

Rizal Memorial College Gymnasium, Davao City

This is the first playoff meeting between the Tigers and the Volcanoes.

==== (2) Bacoor City Strikers vs. (7) GenSan Warriors ====
S+A
LIGA
iWant

February 19
08:30 pm

Boxscore

Bacoor City Strikers	95–72	GenSan Warriors
Scoring by quarter: 24–9, 21–17, 24–28, 26–18
Pts: Gabriel Banal 20; Rebs: Michael Mabulac 12; Asts: Gabriel Banal 11		Pts: Celiz 17; Rebs: Raymundo 9 Asts: Mike Williams 8

Strike Gymnasium, Bacoor, Cavite
Referees: G. Gabriel, M. Quinay, B. Estroga

S+A
LIGA
iWant

February 24
06:30 pm

Boxscore

GenSan Warriors	60–69	Bacoor City Strikers
Scoring by quarter: 17–16, 16–17, 24–19, 12–8
Pts: Robby Celiz 22; Rebs: Daryl Goloran 10; Asts: Mikey Williams 5		Pts: Chris Sumalinog 16; Rebs: Gabriel Banal 7 Asts: RJ Ramirez 7
Bacoor wins series, 2–0

Lamitan Capitol Gym, Lamitan City, Basilan

Head-to-head matchup

S+A
LIGA
iWant

January 20
8:30 pm

Boxscore

Bacoor City Strikers	87–75	GenSan Warriors
Scoring by quarter: 16–18, 22–7, 19–29, 30–21
Pts: Michael Mabulac 17; Rebs: Michael Mabulac 10; Asts: Gabriel Banal 11		Pts: Mikey Williams 17; Rebs: Robby Celiz 9 Asts: Pamboy Raymundo 8

Strike Gymnasium, Bacoor, Cavite

This is the second playoff meeting between these two teams, with the Strikers winning the first one.

Previous playoffs series
Bacoor leads 1–0 in all-time playoff series

2019

Bacoor City Strikers 2, GenSan Warriors 0

2019 Southern Division First Round

==== (3) Basilan Steel vs. (6) Iloilo United Royals ====
S+A
LIGA
iWant

February 19
06:30 pm

Boxscore

Basilan Steel	83–68	Iloilo United Royals
Scoring by quarter: 22–10, 20–26, 19–17, 22–15
Pts: Jerald Bautista 21; Rebs: Cris Dumapig 9 Asts: Hesed Gabo 5		Pts: JR Parker 11; Rebs: Rey Publico 6 Asts: JR Parker 3

Strike Gymnasium, Bacoor, Cavite
Referees: J. Belnas, S. Pingol, A. Manzano

S+A
LIGA
iWant

February 24
08:30 pm

Boxscore

Iloilo United Royals	63–70	Basilan Steel
Scoring by quarter: 24–18, 12–17, 18–15, 16–13
Pts: Alfrancis Tamsi 16; Rebs: Richard Escoto 8 Asts: Aaron Jeruta 4		Pts: Jay Collado 18; Rebs: Cris Dumapig 11; Asts: Hesed Gabo 4
Basilan wins series, 2–0

Lamitan Capitol Gym, Lamitan City, Basilan

This is the first playoff meeting between the Steel and United Royals.

==== (4) Batangas City Athletics vs. (5) Zamboanga Family's Brand Sardines ====
S+A
LIGA
iWant

February 17
06:30 pm

Boxscore

Batangas City Athletics	74–78	Zamboanga Family's Brand Sardines
Scoring by quarter: 25–22, 7–18, 22–17, 20–21
Pts: Jeff Viernes 18; Rebs: Jhaymo Eguilos 9 Asts: Jeff Viernes 5		Pts: Alvin Pasaol 17; Rebs: Robin Roño 8 Asts: Raffy Reyes 6

Rizal Memorial College Gymnasium, Davao City
Referees: Jonald Belnas, Julius Tiquio, S. Pingol

S+A
LIGA
iWant

February 21
08:30 pm

Boxscore

Zamboanga Family's Brand Sardines	75–84	Batangas City Athletics
Scoring by quarter: 18–23, 21–10, 23–11, 22–31
Pts: Santi Santillan 23; Rebs: Santi Santillan 11; Asts: Harold Arboleda 5		Pts: Jhaymo Eguilos 17; Rebs: Jhaymo Eguilos 11; Asts: Jeff Viernes 8

Batangas State University Gym, Batangas City

S+A
LIGA
iWant

February 26
06:30 pm

Boxscore

Batangas City Athletics	52–69	Zamboanga Family's Brand Sardines
Scoring by quarter: 15–17, 13–12, 22–14, 19–9
Pts: Jeff Viernes 13; Rebs: Jhaymo Eguilos 10; Asts: Jason Melano 3		Pts: Harold Arboleda 15; Rebs: Harold Arboleda 9 Asts: Harold Arboleda 3
Zamboanga wins series, 2–1

Rizal Memorial College Gymnasium, Davao City

This is the second playoff meeting between these two teams, with the Athletics winning the first one.

Previous playoffs series
Batangas City leads 1–0 in all-time playoff series

2019

Batangas City Athletics 2, Zamboanga Family's Brand Sardines 1

2019 Southern Division semifinals

== Division semifinals ==
=== Northern Division ===
==== (1) San Juan Knights vs. (4) Pampanga Giant Lanterns ====
LIGA
iWant

February 28
9:00 pm

Boxscore

San Juan Knights	86–84	Pampanga Giant Lanterns
Scoring by quarter: 20–20, 30–23, 17–22, 19–19
Pts: John Wilson 21; Rebs: Larry Rodriguez 9 Asts: Larry Rodriguez 6		Pts: Michael Juico 18; Rebs: Larry Muyang 11; Asts: Mark Cruz 7

Filoil Flying V Centre, San Juan

S+A
LIGA
iWant

March 4
6:30 pm

Boxscore

Pampanga Giant Lanterns	83–91	San Juan Knights
Scoring by quarter: 25–26, 25–22, 14–21, 19–22
Pts: J. Maiquez 18; Rebs: J. Maiquez 11; Asts: Mark Cruz 8		Pts: John Wilson 26; Rebs: Jhonard Clarito 14; Asts: John Wilson 6
San Juan wins series, 2–0

San Andres Sports Complex, Malate, Manila

This is the first playoff meeting between the Knights and Lanterns.

==== (2) Manila Stars vs. (3) Makati Super Crunch ====
LIGA
iWant

February 28
6:30 pm

Boxscore

Manila Stars	77–74	Makati Super Crunch
Scoring by quarter: 18–10, 26–18, 18–24, 18–22
Pts: Carlo Lastimosa 25; Rebs: Mark Dyke 9 Asts: Christopher Bitoon 6		Pts: Jeckster Apinan 17; Rebs: Jeckster Apinan 11; Asts: Joseph Sedurifa 6

Filoil Flying V Centre, San Juan

S+A
LIGA
iWant

March 4
9:00 pm

Boxscore

Makati Super Crunch	75–59	Manila Stars
Scoring by quarter: 19–8, 18–13, 10–20, 28–18
Pts: Joshua Torralba 23; Rebs: Jeckster Apinan 17; Asts: Rudy Lingganay 4		Pts: Marvin Hayes 11; Rebs: Ronnie Matias 11; Asts: Christopher Bitoon 8

San Andres Sports Complex, Malate, Manila

S+A
LIGA
iWant

March 6
6:30 pm

Boxscore

Manila Stars	75–78 (OT)	Makati Super Crunch
Scoring by quarter: 18–23, 21–10, 15–23, 11–13, Overtime: 11–8
Pts: Christopher Bitoon 16; Rebs: Mark Dyke 10; Asts: Christopher Bitoon 6		Pts: Jhong Baloria 16; Rebs: Jeckster Apinan 9 Asts: Jeckster Apinan 3
Makati wins series, 2–1

San Andres Sports Complex, Malate, Manila

This is the first playoff meeting between the Stars and the Super Crunch.

=== Southern Division ===
==== (1) Davao Occidental Tigers vs. (5) Zamboanga Family's Brand Sardines ====
S+A
LIGA
iWant

March 2
9:00 pm

Boxscore

Davao Occidental Tigers	47–28	Zamboanga Family's Brand Sardines
Scoring by quarter: 11–5, 8–6, 16–12, 12–5
Pts: Eman Calo 12; Rebs: Chester Saldua 12; Asts: Joseph Terso 4		Pts: Santi Santillan 8 Rebs: Santi Santillan 8 Asts: Harold Arboleda 1

Rizal Memorial College Gymnasium, Davao City

S+A
LIGA
iWant

March 5
6:30 pm

Boxscore

Zamboanga Family's Brand Sardines	58–62	Davao Occidental Tigers
Scoring by quarter: 14–11, 12–14, 15–19, 17–18
Pts: Robin Rono 15; Rebs: Harold Arboleda and Leonard Santillan 8 each Asts: Harold Arboleda 7		Pts: J. Mocon 14; Rebs: Billy Ray Robles 8 Asts: Bonbon Custodio 4
Davao Occidental wins series, 2–0

Strike Gymnasium, Bacoor, Cavite

This is the first playoff meeting between the Tigers and the Valientes.

==== (2) Bacoor City Strikers vs. (3) Basilan Steel ====
S+A
LIGA
iWant

March 2
6:30 pm

Boxscore

Bacoor City Strikers	63–77	Basilan Steel
Scoring by quarter: 16–14, 19–12, 19–25, 23–12
Pts: Chris Sumalinog 10; Rebs: Michael Mabulac 8 Asts: Gabriel Banal 4		Pts: Allyn Bulanadi 22; Rebs: Arvie Bringas 14; Asts: Hessed Gabo 6

Rizal Memorial College Gymnasium, Davao City

S+A
LIGA
iWant

March 5
9:00 pm

Boxscore

Basilan Steel	69–80	Bacoor City Strikers
Scoring by quarter: 6–20, 15–23, 23–23, 14–25
Pts: Allyn Bulanadi 16; Rebs: Cris Dumapig 7 Asts: Irven Palencia 4		Pts: Ian Melencio 17; Rebs: Michael Mabulac 19; Asts: Eric Acuña 8

Strike Gymnasium, Bacoor, Cavite

S+A
LIGA
iWant

March 7
6:30 pm

Boxscore

Bacoor City Strikers	76–84	Basilan Steel
Scoring by quarter: 19–22, 22–13, 19–21, 24–20
Pts: Ian Melencio 22; Rebs: Michael Mabulac 13; Asts: Ian Melencio 4		Pts: Allyn Bulanadi 35; Rebs: Jay Collado 15; Asts: Chris Dumapig 4
Basilan wins series, 2–1

Strike Gymnasium, Bacoor, Cavite

This is the first playoff meeting between the Steel and the Strikers.

== Division finals ==
=== North Division finals ===
==== (1) San Juan Knights vs. (3) Makati Super Crunch ====
S+A
LIGA
iWant

March 9, 2020
6:30 pm

Boxscore

San Juan Knights	76–60	Makati Super Crunch
Scoring by quarter: 24–11, 24–14, 18–16, 20–9
Pts: Jhonard Clarito 19; Rebs: Jhonard Clarito 18; Asts: Jamil Gabawan 4		Pts: Cedrick Ablaza 11; Rebs: Joseph Sedurifa 7 Asts: Rudy Lingganay 3

Filoil Flying V Centre, San Juan
Referees: Rommel Alcoran, H. Scott, Julius Tiquio

S+A
LIGA
iWant

March 11, 2020
9:00 pm

Boxscore

Makati Super Crunch	91–88	San Juan Knights
Scoring by quarter: 18–18, 20–17, 24–19, 29–34
Pts: Jeckster Apinan 20; Rebs: Jeckster Apinan 12; Asts: Rudy Lingganay 7		Pts: John Wilson 21; Rebs: Jhonard Clarito 11; Asts: Orlan Wamar 3

Filoil Flying V Centre, San Juan
Attendance: 0 (behind closed doors) (Note: Game was played behind closed doors due to concerns over the COVID-19.)
Referees: Jovet Ocfemia, E. Avis, J. Francisco

A2Z

March 10, 2021
4:00 pm

Boxscore

San Juan Knights	131–54	Makati Super Crunch
Scoring by quarter: 38–11, 26–6, 30–19, 37–18
Pts: John Wilson 22; Rebs: Jhonard Clarito 13; Asts: Mike Ayonayon 11		Pts: Edwin Asoro 21; Rebs: Carlos Jay Lloren 8 Asts: Mark Lester Sta. Maria 5
San Juan wins series, 2–1

Subic Bay Gymnasium, Subic
Attendance: 0 (behind closed doors)
Referees: J. Castroverde, E. Avis, R. Brila

Game 3 of the North Division finals was heavily affected in the San Juan Knights' favor as the Makati Super Crunch entered this game with only a five-man roster. Financial troubles amid the COVID-19 pandemic caused key players of the Makati side to not play for the team in the crucial do-or-die game.

=== South Division finals ===
==== (1) Davao Occidental Tigers vs. (3) Basilan Steel ====
S+A
LIGA
iWant

March 9, 2020
8:30 pm

Boxscore

Davao Occidental Tigers	72–74	Basilan Steel
Scoring by quarter: 16–16, 20–20, 20–20, 16–18
Pts: Billy Ray Robles 15; Rebs: Chester Saldua and Billy Ray Robles 10 each Asts: Billy Ray Robles 5		Pts: Allyn Bulanadi 15; Rebs: Allyn Bulanadi 9 Asts: Hesed Gabo 12

RDR Gymnasium, Tagum City, Davao del Norte

S+A
LIGA
iWant

March 11, 2020
6:30 pm

Boxscore

Basilan Steel	76–81	Davao Occidental Tigers
Scoring by quarter: 15–18, 21–19, 28–18, 17–21
Pts: Japs Bautista 24; Rebs: Jay Collado 8 Asts: Hesed Gabo 11		Pts: Eman Calo 17; Rebs: Eman Calo 8 Asts: Joseph Terso 4

Lamitan Capitol Gym, Lamitan City, Basilan
Referees: J. Castroverde, B. Estroga, E. Villaroza

March 16, 2021

Davao Occidental Tigers	2–0	Basilan Steel
Davao Occidental won Game 3 by default.
Davao Occidental wins series, 2–1

Subic Bay Gymnasium, Subic

This game was originally going to be postponed after a player from the Basilan Steel tested positive from COVID-19. The league decided that should another member of the Basilan delegation test positive, the game would be defaulted and Davao Occidental would win the series and the division title. On March 16, the league announced that an additional two members of the Basilan delegation were also tested positive from the virus. As a result, the game, the series, and the division title were all awarded in favor of Davao Occidental by default. As per FIBA rules, the game was ruled as a 2–0 victory for Davao Occidental.

== 2021 MPBL finals: (N1) San Juan Knights vs. (S1) Davao Occidental Tigers ==
The San Juan Knights and the Davao Occidental Tigers competed in the MPBL finals to determine the third MPBL Champions. This was the first championship series to be held entirely inside a bubble, hosted by Subic. The series was a rematch of the last season's finals between both teams, with San Juan winning last year's championship in five games. The Tigers avenged their last season's finals loss against the Knights, defeating them in four games to win the title.

A2Z
Facebook

March 17, 2021
4:00 pm

Boxscore

San Juan Knights	75–77 (OT)	Davao Occidental Tigers
Scoring by quarter: 15–15, 15–15, 19–13, 19–25, Overtime: 7–9
Pts: Mike Ayonayon 27; Rebs: Jhonard Clarito 11; Asts: Mike Ayonayon 5		Pts: Emman Calo, Mark Yee 15 each Rebs: Billy Ray Robles 11; Asts: Billy Ray Robles 4
Davao Occiental leads series, 1–0

Subic Bay Gymnasium, Subic
Referees: J. Castroverde, E. Avis, R. Brila

A2Z
Facebook

March 18, 2021
4:00 pm

Boxscore

San Juan Knights	70–65	Davao Occidental Tigers
Scoring by quarter: 15–15, 23–22, 14–13, 18–15
Pts: John Wilson 17; Rebs: Jhonard Clarito 11; Asts: Mike Ayonayon 9		Pts: Emman Calo 26; Rebs: Mark Yee, Billy Ray Robles 10 each Asts: Mark Yee, Yvan Ludovice 3 each
Series tied, 1–1

Subic Bay Gymnasium, Subic
Referees: B. Estroga, R. Brila, G. Villanueva

A2Z
Facebook

March 20, 2021
3:00 pm

Boxscore

San Juan Knights	58–66	Davao Occidental Tigers
Scoring by quarter: 14–15, 13–26, 15–11, 16–14
Pts: Mike Ayonayon 16; Rebs: John Wilson 9 Asts: Mike Ayonayon 3		Pts: Billy Ray Robles 13; Rebs: Mark Yee 11; Asts: Yvan Ludovice, Bonbon Custodio 3 each
Davao Occidental leads series, 2–1

Subic Bay Gymnasium, Subic

A2Z
Facebook

March 21, 2021
4:00 pm

Boxscore

San Juan Knights	88–89 (OT)	Davao Occidental Tigers
Scoring by quarter: 18–24, 13–16, 29–16, 20–24, Overtime: 8–9
Pts: Larry Rodriguez 19; Rebs: Jhonard Clarito 11; Asts: Carlos Isit Jr. 10		Pts: Emman Calo 22; Rebs: Mark Yee 12; Asts: Billy Ray Robles 6
Davao Occidental wins series, 3–1

Subic Bay Gymnasium, Subic

This is the second finals meeting between the Knights and the Tigers, with the Knights winning the first one.

Previous playoffs series
San Juan leads 1–0 in all-time playoff series

2019

San Juan Knights 3, Davao Occidental Tigers 2

2019 MPBL finals

== Broadcast notes ==
As part of the broadcast deal, ABS-CBN held the broadcast rights for the entire playoff series. Prior to the suspension, all games were split between the network's sports channels, S+A and Liga. During the midst of the suspension, ABS-CBN's franchise expired, thus all post-suspension games were aired on A2Z, formed via a blocktime agreement with ZOE Broadcasting Network.
