= South Division (MPBL) =

Division of the Maharlika Pilipinas Basketball League

- League: Maharlika Pilipinas Basketball League
- Sport: Basketball
- Founded: 2018
- No. of teams: 12
- Most recent champions: Quezon Huskers (2nd title)
- Most titles: Davao Occidental Tigers; Quezon Huskers (2 titles each)

The South Division is one of two divisions in the Maharlika Pilipinas Basketball League (MPBL), the other being the North Division. Both divisions were formed as a result of the league's national expansion in the 2018–19 season. As of July 2026, the South Division consists of 12 teams.

At the start of the 2026 season, the South Division had 14 teams. The Iloilo United Royals and Negros Hacienderos returned to the league while the Davao Occidental Tigers departed. The Muntinlupa Cagers, who relocated to southern Bulacan and became the Meycauayan Marilao Gems, were realigned to the North as well as the Parañaque Patriots in order to even the two divisions.

In June 2026, Iloilo had its franchise revoked by the league due to team management's failure in abiding by the league's regulations. The following month, Bacolod was disqualified from the season due to game-fixing allegations.

== 2026 standings ==
Pos	Team	Pld	W	L	GB
1	q – Biñan Tatak Gel	19	16	3	—
2	q – Cebu Greats	21	16	5	1
3	q – Batangas City Athletics	18	15	3	0.5
4	q – Quezon Huskers	16	14	2	0.5
5	q – GenSan Warriors	18	14	4	1.5
6	q – Rizal Golden Coolers	19	12	7	4
7	Basilan Steel	21	10	11	7
8	Mindoro Tamaraws	18	9	9	6.5
9	Zamboanga Sikat	19	8	11	8
10	e – Sarangani Marlins	20	4	16	12.5
11	e – Imus Bandera	19	3	16	13
12	e – Bacolod Masskara	22	3	19	14.5
13	e – Negros Hacienderos	18	1	17	14.5
DQ	~~Iloilo United Royals~~ (Note: The Iloilo United Royals were disqualified by the league due to the team's failure to comply with financial obligations.)	0	~~2~~	~~12~~	6.5

Updated to match(es) played on July 30, 2026. Source: Standings
Rules for classification: 1) Wins; 2a) If two teams are tied, head-to-head match-up; 2b) If three or more teams are tied, head-to-head point quotient; 3) overall point quotient; 4) coin toss.
e – Eliminated from direct playoff qualification; can still clinch play-in berth; q – Qualified for postseason; can clinch playoff berth

== Teams ==
=== Current ===
Team	Location	Years in division
Bacolod Masskara	Bacolod	2019–present
Basilan Steel	Lamitan, Basilan	2018–2020; 2025–present
Batangas City Athletics	Batangas City, Batangas	2018–present
Biñan Tatak Gel	Biñan, Laguna	2018–present
Cebu Greats	Cebu City	2018–2020; 2025–present
GenSan Warriors	General Santos	2018–present
Iloilo United Royals	Passi, Iloilo	2019–2020; 2023–2024; 2026–present
Imus Bandera	Imus, Cavite	2018–present
Mindoro Tamaraws	Pola, Oriental Mindoro	2019–present
Negros Hacienderos	Bacolod	2023–2024; 2026–present
Quezon Huskers	Lucena, Quezon	2023–present
Rizal Golden Coolers	Antipolo, Rizal	2018–2019; 2022; 2025–present
Sarangani Marlins	Alabel, Sarangani	2019–present
Zamboanga Sikat	Zamboanga City	2018–present

=== Former ===
Team	Locality	Years in division	Current division
Bacoor City Strikers	Bacoor, Cavite	2018–2023	Inactive
Bicol Volcanoes	Legazpi, Albay	2019–2020; 2023–2024	Inactive
Davao Occidental Tigers	Davao Occidental	2018–2020; 2024–2025	Inactive
Marikina Shoemasters	Marikina	2018–2019	North Division
Muntinlupa Cagers (now Meycauayan Marilao Gems)	Muntinlupa	2018–2025	North Division
Parañaque Patriots	Parañaque	2018–2020; 2024–2025	North Division

=== Timeline ===
Denotes team that is currently in the division
Denotes team that has left the division
Denotes period in which the team is/was in the opposing division

== South Division finals history ==
Numbers in parentheses indicate the number of times that team has appeared in the South Division finals, as well as each respective teams' South Division finals record up to date.

Won MPBL finals

Season	Champion	Series	Runner-up
2018–19; Datu Cup	Davao Occidental (1, 1–0)	2–1	Batangas City (1, 0–1)
2019–20; Lakan Season	Davao Occidental (2, 2–0)	2–1	Basilan (1, 0–1)
2022	Zamboanga (1, 1–0)	2–1	Batangas City (2, 0–2)
2023	Bacoor City (1, 1–0)	2–0	Batangas City (3, 0–3)
2024	Quezon (1, 1–0)	2–1	Batangas City (4, 0–4)
2025	Quezon (2, 2–0)	3–2	Biñan (1, 0–1)

== Season results ==
Legend
Won MPBL finals
Won division finals, but lost the MPBL finals
Qualified for the playoffs
Qualified for the play-in, but failed to reach playoffs

Season	Team														
Season	1st	2nd	3rd	4th	5th	6th	7th	8th	9th	10th	11th	12th	13th	14th	15th
2018: The South Division was formed with thirteen member teams.
2018–19; Datu Cup	DVO (20–5)	BTG (15–10)	MUN (15–10)	GS (14–11)	BCR (13–12)	ZAM (12–13)	IMS (11–14)	CEB (11–14)	LAG (10–15)	PAR (9–16)	MAR (8–17)	BAS (7–18)	RZL (7–18)	—N/a	—N/a
2019: Expansion sides Bacolod, Bicol, Iloilo, Mindoro and Soccsksargen joined the South Division. Marikina, Parañaque, and Rizal were realigned to the North Division. Cebu City, Laguna, and Soccsksargen changed its location identifiers to Cebu, Biñan, and Sarangani, respectively.
2019–20; Lakan Season	DVO (26–4)	BCR (24–6)	BAS (20–10)	BTG (19–11)	ZAM (18–12)	ILO (18–12)	GS (18–12)	BCL (16–14)	CEB (15–15)	BIÑ (12–18)	BCD (11–19)	MDR (9–21)	MUN (7–23)	IMS (6–24)	SAR (1–29)
2022: Basilan, Bicol, Cebu, Davao Occidental, and Iloilo departed from the league. Rizal rejoined from the North Division. Biñan reverted its location identifier back to Laguna.
2022	ZAM (18–3)	BTG (17–4)	SAR (16–5)	GS (15–6)	BCD (14–7)	RZL (10–11)	BCR (9–12)	MUN (6–15)	IMS (5–16)	LAG (3–18)	MDR (1–20)	—N/a	—N/a	—N/a	—N/a
2023: Expansion sides Negros and Quezon joined the South Division alongside returning sides Bicol and Iloilo. Rizal was realigned back to the North Division. Mindoro briefly changed its location identifier to Oriental Mindoro before reverting.
2023	BCR (23–5)	BTG (22–6)	GS (21–7)	ZAM (20–8)	QZN (19–9)	MUN (16–12)	IMS (15–13)	ILO (12–16)	BCD (11–17)	SAR (11–17)	NEG (10–18)	MDR (6–22)	LAG (4–23)	BCL (1–27)	—N/a
2024: Returning side Davao Occidental was placed in the South Division while Bacoor City departed from the league. Parañaque rejoined from the North Division. General Santos and Laguna changed its location identiers to South Cotabato and Biñan, respectively.
2024	QZN (21–7)	BTG (20–8)	BIÑ (20–8)	ZAM (20–8)	PAR (17–11)	SOC (17–11)	DVO (15–13)	NEG (12–16)	ILO (11–17)	MDR (10–18)	MUN (7–21)	SAR (5–23)	BCL (3–25)	IMS (2–26)	BCD (1–27)
2025: Returning sides Basilan and Cebu were placed in the South Division while Bicol, Iloilo, and Negros departed from the league. Rizal once again rejoined from the North Division. South Cotabato reverted its location identifier back to General Santos.
2025	QZN (25–4)	BTG (20–9)	RZL (19–10)	BAS (18–11)	GS (18–11)	BIÑ (17–12)	ZAM (17–12)	MDR (15–14)	DVO (12–17)	CEB (11–18)	SAR (10–19)	MUN (10–19)	IMS (9–20)	BCD (4–25)	PAR (1–28)
2026: Returning sides Iloilo and Negros were placed in the South Division while Davao Occidental departed from the league. Muntinlupa was realigned to the North Division following their relocation to southern Bulacan. Parañaque also realigned to the North. The Iloilo franchise was revoked midseason.
2026														ILO (WD)	—N/a
