= 2019 MPBL season =

2019 MPBL season may refer to:

- 2018–19 MPBL season
- 2019–20 MPBL season
