= Mac Cuan =

Filipino basketball coach

Personal information
- Born: March 26, 1978 (age 48)
- Listed height: 5 ft 11 in (1.80 m)

Career information
- High school: Claret School of Quezon City
- College: De La Salle
- PBA draft: 2004: 2nd round, 17th overall pick
- Drafted by: Sta. Lucia Realtors
- Playing career: 2004–2006
- Position: Guard
- Coaching career: 2011–2024

Career history

Playing
- 2004–2006: Sta. Lucia Realtors

Coaching
- 2011–2012: De La Salle (assistant)
- 2013–2014: San Miguel Beermen (ABL) (assistant)
- 2014–2016: GlobalPort Batang Pier (assistant)
- 2016–2017: Alab Pilipinas
- 2017–2020: San Miguel Alab Pilipinas (assistant)
- 2018–2019: Mandaluyong El Tigre
- 2019: Imus Bandera
- 2023–2024: Iloilo United Royals (assistant)

Career highlights
- As player: 4x UAAP champion (1998, 1999, 2000, 2001); As assistant coach: ABL champion (2018)

Ronald "Mac" Cuan is a Filipino professional basketball coach and former collegiate player who is formerly an assistant coach for the Iloilo United Royals in the MPBL.

== Playing ==
A former De La Salle Green Archer, he drafted and played for Sta. Lucia Realtors for two seasons.

== Coaching ==
=== Early career ===
He served as an assistant coach for his alma mater La Salle specializing on video coordinator, and for San Miguel Beermen in the ABL.

=== PBA ===
Cuan was the lead assistant of the GlobalPort Batang Pier in 2014 to 2016.

=== Alab Pilipinas ===
Cuan became the head coach of Alab Pilipinas for its founding season in 2016. He was later demoted and replaced by Jimmy Alapag.

=== MPBL ===
Cuan served as head coach for the sole season of Mandaluyong El Tigre, but replaced in mid-season. He was later hired by Imus Bandera to be their head coach but was replaced early.

He served as an assistant coach for the Iloilo United Royals.

== Personal ==
He is the older brother of former UST Growling Tiger and UAAP champion, Japs Cuan.
