= Cebu Greats =

Basketball team in Cebu, Philippines

- 2026 Cebu Greats season
- League: MPBL
- Founded: 2018; 8 years ago
- History: Cebu City Sharks; 2018–2019; Cebu Sharks; 2019; Cebu Casino Ethyl Alcohol; 2019–2020; Cebu Classic; 2025; Cebu Greats; 2025–present
- Arena: Hoops Dome; Southwestern University; University of San Jose–Recoletos; Cebu Coliseum
- Location: Cebu, Philippines
- Team colors
- Head coach: Aldrin Morante

The Cebu Greats is a Filipino professional basketball team based in the Cebu metropolitan area. The team competes in the Maharlika Pilipinas Basketball League (MPBL) as a member of the league's South Division. The team has played its home games across multiple venues across Metro Cebu.

The team began play in the 2018–19 season as the Cebu City Sharks, then renamed as the Cebu Sharks the following season. Midway through the season, the team was renamed as the Cebu Casino Ethyl Alcohol, named after Casino Ethyl Alcohol from owners International Pharmaceuticals Incorporated.

The team then went on hiatus for five years before making a return for the 2025 MPBL season as the Cebu Classic, before an ownership change in the middle of that season saw the franchise rebrand as the Cebu Greats. The Cebu franchise is one of four teams based in Visayas, the teams are Bacolod Masskara, Negros Hacienderos and Iloilo United Royals and the lone team based in the Central Visayas region.

== History ==
=== 2018–2020: First stint ===
The Cebu City Sharks were one of sixteen expansion teams in the 2018–19 MPBL season, as well as the first team based in Visayas. That season saw Cebu make the playoffs despite having a losing record, they eventually lost to the Davao Occidental Tigers. In the 2019–20 season, the team finished ninth, one game behind the eighth-place team in the South Division, the Bicol Volcanoes. The Cebu franchise also had an all-star selection in each of its first two seasons: Patrick Cabahug in 2019 and Will McAloney in 2020.

=== 2025–present: Second stint ===
The Cebu franchise was mentioned as among the teams that were set to return for the league's 2023 season, however its return did not materialize for unknown reasons. Two years later in 2025, another attempt at Cebu's return to the MPBL was first reported by journalist Snow Badua, stating from his source that the franchise was bought by new management and that it is "finalizing details” for its revival. The revival will be managed by Voltaire Ora, who was previously the team manager of the Valenzuela Classic. Among the players joining the revived team are Paulo Hubalde and Rashawn McCarthy. Greg Slaughter was also set to join, but eventually turned away from the team.

== Team roster ==
=== Current roster ===
Cebu Greats roster
Players

Pos.	No.	Name	Height	Weight	DOB	From
G	1	Andrey Armenion (HG)	5 ft 11 in (1.80 m)			UE
G/F	2	Isaiah Blanco-Hontiveros (HG)	6 ft 3 in (1.91 m)			De La Salle
G/F	3	Al Francis Tamsi	6 ft 1 in (1.85 m)	158 lb (72 kg)	1992–03–25	Far Eastern
F	4	CJ Payawal (FF)	6 ft 5 in (1.96 m)	190 lb (86 kg)	1997–06–02	UE
F	6	Wowie Escosio	6 ft 4 in (1.93 m)	202 lb (92 kg)	1991–10–16	Visayas
G	7	Ron Dennison (HG)	6 ft 1 in (1.85 m)			Far Eastern
G	8	Brylle Meca (HG)	6 ft 0 in (1.83 m)		1993–05–21	Arellano
F/C	9	Dolan Adlawan (HG)	6 ft 5 in (1.96 m)			San Carlos
F/C	15	Alvin Baetiong	6 ft 5 in (1.96 m)	242 lb (110 kg)	1996–01–26	Lyceum
F	17	Kint Devone Ariar (HG)	6 ft 3 in (1.91 m)			Letran
G	18	Paul Desiderio (HG)	6 ft 1 in (1.85 m)	168 lb (76 kg)	1997–02–02	Philippines
G	19	Elmer Echavez (HG)	5 ft 9 in (1.75 m)			USJ–R
PG	20	Christian Coronel	5 ft 11 in (1.80 m)	165 lb (75 kg)	1980–03–03	San Sebastian
G	21	Ichie Altamirano	5 ft 11 in (1.80 m)			San Sebastian
F	22	Simon Camacho	6 ft 5 in (1.96 m)			Adamson
G	23	Jun Manzo	5 ft 9 in (1.75 m)		1997–02–14	Philippines
F	24	Dhon Reverente	6 ft 1 in (1.85 m)	175 lb (79 kg)	1989–04–24	PMI
G/F	25	Dondon Hontiveros (HG)	6 ft 3 in (1.91 m)	175 lb (79 kg)	1977–06–01	Cebu
F	31	Mark Meneses	6 ft 4 in (1.93 m)		1998–01–13	Luzon
G	33	Limuel Tampus	6 ft 2 in (1.88 m)			Emilio Aguinaldo
F/C	48	J. R. Quiñahan (HG)	6 ft 6 in (1.98 m)	235 lb (107 kg)	1984–05–08	Visayas
G	77	Jonathan Ralf Gesalem (HG)	6 ft 1 in (1.85 m)			UST
G	89	Jancork Cabahug (HG)	6 ft 2 in (1.88 m)			Visayas

Coaches

Head coach

- Aldrin Morante

Assistant coach(es)

- Willie Generalao
- Angelo Lance Ingco
- Ronjay Enrile
- Corvi Concepcion
- Dondon Hontiveros

Team consultant

- Junthy Valenzuela

Team manager

- John Santos

Legend

- (HG) Homegrown
- (FF) Filipino-foreigner
- (EA) EASL player
- (RS) Reserve player
- (S) Suspended
- Injured

- Roster – Genius Sports (MPBL)
Updated as of: June 22, 2026

=== Head coaches ===
Cebu Greats head coaches
#	Name	Start	End	Achievements	Ref.
1	Gilbert Castillo	2018	2018	—	
2	Norberto Manalili	2018	2019	—	
3	Expedito Falcasantos	2019	2020	—	
4	Mike Reyes	2025		—	
5	Junthy Valenzuela	2025	2025	—	
6	Aldrin Morante	2026	current	—	

== Notable players ==
=== MPBL All-Star Day ===
All-Star selections

- Patrick Cabahug – 2019
- Will McAloney – 2020

=== PBA players ===
Ex-PBA players

- Simon Camacho
- Paul Desiderio
- Brian Heruela
- Dondon Hontiveros
- Paulo Hubalde
- Rashawn McCarthy
- CJ Payawal
- J. R. Quiñahan
- Eric Rodriguez
- Mac Tallo

== Season-by-season records ==
Note: Statistics are correct as of the end of the 2026 MPBL season.

League champions
Division champions
Qualified for playoffs
Best regular season record

Season	League	Division	Regular season						Playoffs	
Season	League	Division	Finish	Played	Wins	Losses	Win %	GB	Round	Results
Cebu City Sharks
2018–19	MPBL	South	8th	25	11	14	.440	9	Division quarterfinals	lost vs. Davao Occidental, 0–2
Cebu Casino Ethyl Alcohol
2019–20	MPBL	South	9th	30	15	15	.500	11	Did not qualify	
Did not participate from 2022 to 2024
Cebu Greats
2025	MPBL	South	10th	29	11	18	.379	14	Clinched play-in; did not qualify playoffs	
2026	MPBL	South	5th	25	19	6	.760	2	Division quarterfinals Division semifinals	won vs. Batangas City, 2–0 lost vs. Quezon, 0–2
Regular season record				109	56	53	.514		2 playoff appearances	
Playoff record				6	2	4	.333		0 finals appearances	
Cumulative record				115	58	57	.504		0 championships	
