= Makati Skyscrapers =

Professional basketball team in Metro Manila, Philippines

- League: MPBL (2018–2023); Filbasket (2021–2022); Chooks-to-Go Pilipinas 3x3
- Founded: 2018
- Dissolved: 2023
- History: Makati Skyscrapers; 2018; Makati Super Crunch; 2018–2021; Makati FSD Blazers; 2021; Makati × MNL Kingpin; 2022; Makati OKBet Kings; 2023
- Arena: Makati Coliseum
- Location: Makati
- Team colors: Makati Skyscrapers/Super Crunch Makati × MNL Kingpin Makati OKBet Kings

The Makati Skyscrapers were a Philippine professional basketball team based in Makati. The team last competed in the Maharlika Pilipinas Basketball League (MPBL) from 2018 to 2023 and played its home games at Makati Coliseum.

The team began play in the 2018–19 season and has since gone under multiple names under a title sponsor. In the 2023 season, the team was acquired owned and sponsored by sports betting platform and former MPBL title sponsor OKBet.

The team also competed in Filbasket as the AFP–FSD Makati Cavaliers, and in the Chooks-to-Go Pilipinas 3x3.

== History ==
=== 2018–2020: Initial success ===
On April 10, 2018, the City Government of Makati launched the Makati Skyscrapers as one of 16 expansion teams for the MPBL's 2018–19 season. Out of those 16 expansion teams, Makati was the team with the best record, finishing 21–4, only behind the league-leading Bataan Risers. This success, however, cannot be matched in the playoffs, as the second-seeded team in the North were swept by the seventh-seeded Quezon City Capitals in the First Round.

The team was able to continue their winning prowess in the 2019–20 season, finishing 22–8 and claiming the North Division's third seed. In the playoffs, the team first swept Bulacan in the First Round and beat Manila in a close series in the Division Semifinals.

Makati made its first appearance in the Division Finals, and were challenged to face against the defending champion San Juan Knights. After losing to San Juan in game 1 as the visiting team, the team was set to host game 2 at home. However, due to the COVID-19 pandemic in the Philippines, game 2 would be moved to San Juan to be played Behind closed doors. Still, Makati persevered and forced a game 3 by a close margin. Later on, the league suspended play as the pandemic continuously affected the country, forcing the Division Finals to be halted after game 2.

=== 2021–2022: Abrupt fallout ===
One year later, the league continued play under a bio-secure bubble at the Subic Bay Gymnasium. The pandemic brought a financial crisis to the Makati team, which led to a major scuffle as core players decided to not play for the team in the deciding game 3. By game 3, Makati only fielded a five-man roster, which caused San Juan to eliminate Makati by a wide 77-point margin.

The fallout of Makati continued on as the team failed to make the playoffs of the 2021 Invitational, and as the 2022 season came around, the team only captured two wins in the 21-game season, making them the worst team in the North Division and missing the playoffs for the first time.

=== 2023: Returning to the winning column ===
Logo of the Makati OKBet Kings used in 2023.

Prior to the 2023 season, gaming company and MPBL title sponsor OKBet acquired the franchise of the team. The team was completely rebuilt as the team went back to where they were three years ago, once again claiming the third seed in the North with a record of 21–7, which includes wins against Pampanga, Nueva Ecija, and Batangas City.

In the First Round, the team will once again face against the San Juan Knights, the team that last eliminated them in 2021.

== Team identity ==
The team first went by the Makati Skyscrapers in its inaugural season, alluding to the numerous tall buildings across the city. Mid-season, the team's name was changed to the Makati Super Crunch as part of a sponsorship with Prifood Corporation, and has since then taken on the name of its title sponsor.

For most of its time, Makati has used a color scheme that uses black as the primary color. In 2023, blue was made the primary color in its uniforms.

== Home arenas ==
Unlike other Metro Manila-based teams, the Makati franchise has had a rough history with playing within its home locality. In the 2018–19 season, the team played all of its home games at Ynares Sports Arena in Pasig.

In the 2019–20 season, the team began using the Makati Coliseum on a regular basis, but concerns regarding the venue forced the team to play elsewhere during the 2020 playoffs. Since then, the team has yet to return to Makati Coliseum.

== Personnel ==
=== Head coaches ===
Makati Skyscrapers head coaches
#	Name	Start	End	Achievements	Ref.
1	Pocholo Villanueva	2018	2019	—	
2	Beaujing Acot	2019	2021	—	
3	Jocas Castillo	2021	2021	—	
4	Vis Valencia	2022	2022	—	
5	Don Dulay	2023	2023	—	

=== Notable players ===
Makati Skyscrapers notable players
Player	Position	Tenure	Awards	All-Star
Cedric Ablaza		2018–2020	—	2 (2019, 2020)
Jeckster Apinan		2018–2020	1x All-MPBL First Team (2020)	—
Carlos Morales		2018–2023	—	1 (2022)
Emman Calo		2023	—	1 (2023)
Robby Celiz		2023	1x All-MPBL Second Team (2023)	1 (2023)

== Season-by-season records ==
League champions
Division champions
Qualified for playoffs
Best regular season record

Season	Regular season							Playoffs	
Season	Division	Finish	GP	W	L	PCT	GB	Stage	Results
Makati Super Crunch
2018–19; Datu Cup	North	2nd	25	21	4	.840	2	First Round	lost vs. Quezon City, 0–2
2019–20; Lakan Season	North	3rd	30	22	8	.733	4	First Round; Division Semifinals; Division Finals	won vs. Bulacan, 2–0 won vs. Manila, 2–1 lost vs. San Juan, 1–2
Makati × MNL Kingpin
2022	North	11th	21	2	19	.095	19	Did not qualify	
Makati OKBet Kings
2023	North	3rd	28	21	7	.750	5	First Round	lost vs. San Juan, 0–2
Did not participate from 2024 to 2026
Total elimination round			104	66	38	.635		3 playoff appearances	
Total playoffs			12	5	7	.417		0 Finals appearances	
Total franchise			116	71	45	.612		0 championships	
