= Jonathan Reyes =

Filipino basketball coach

Mindoro Tamaraws
- Position: Team consultant
- League: MPBL

Career information
- College: San Beda

Career history

Coaching
- 2002–2003: San Beda
- 2018–2019: Bacoor City Strikers
- 2019: Imus Bandera
- 2022–2023: Mindoro Tamaraws
- 2024: Bulacan Kuyas
- 2026–present: Mindoro Tamaraws (consultant)

Jonathan Reyes is a Filipino professional basketball coach. He currently serves as a team consultant for the Mindoro Tamaraws. He was also known by his nickname Budds. He is the father of One Sports analyst and former UP Fighting Maroon Mikee Reyes.

== Career ==
Reyes played for San Beda Red Lions in his collegiate days. He also coached the Red Lions in 2002 until 2003, but his two seasons did not produced a title, even a final four appearance, and replaced by Nash Racela.

Reyes returned to coaching, this time with the Foton Pampanga Toplanders.

With the formation of the Maharlika Pilipinas Basketball League, he joined Bacoor Strikers from 2018, with Marlou Aquino as assistant. He also recruited his son Mikee to the team. In October 2018, he stepped down as head coach and replaced by Leo Isaac, citing differences with management. He then coached the Imus Bandera in 2019. But after a month, he was replaced by Mac Cuan.

He later coached the Mindoro Tamaraws in 2022 until 2023, and the Bulacan Kuyas from 2024.
