= 2019–20 MPBL season =

3rd season of the Maharlika Pilipinas Basketball League

- League: Maharlika Pilipinas Basketball League
- Sport: Basketball
- Duration: Regular season: June 12, 2019 – February 12, 2020; Playoffs: February 15 – March 11, 2020 (before suspension); March 10–16, 2021 (resumption); Finals: March 17–21, 2021
- Games: 464 (regular season); 35 (playoffs)
- Teams: 31
- TV partner(s): ABS-CBN (S+A, Liga, A2Z, The Filipino Channel, iWantTFC); Fox Sports

Regular season
- Top seed: San Juan Knights
- Season MVP: John Wilson (San Juan)

Playoffs
- North Division champions: San Juan Knights
- North Division runners-up: Makati Super Crunch
- South Division champions: Davao Occidental Tigers
- South Division runners-up: Basilan Steel

Finals
- Champions: Davao Occidental Tigers
- Runners-up: San Juan Knights
- Finals MVP: Mark Yee (Davao Occidental)

MPBL seasons
- ← 2018–19 2022 →

The 2019–20 MPBL season, also known as the MPBL Lakan Season or the Chooks-to-Go MPBL Lakan Season for sponsorship reasons, was the third season of the Maharlika Pilipinas Basketball League. It was also the last season of the league's amateur era, as they would turn professional in December 2021. The regular season began June 12, 2019 with the opening ceremonies at the SM Mall of Asia Arena in Pasay, and ended on February 12, 2020. The 2020 MPBL All-Star Game was also held at the same venue on February 13, 2020. The playoffs then began on February 15, 2020.

This season was affected by the COVID-19 pandemic in the Philippines as the season had to be suspended on March 11, 2020, midway through the division finals. Nearly one year later, the playoffs resumed on March 10, 2021 with a bubble in the Subic Bay Gymnasium in Subic, Zambales before finally ending on March 21, 2021 when the Davao Occidental Tigers defeated the defending champion San Juan Knights in four games in the 2021 MPBL finals.

This season featured 31 teams, which is currently the biggest the league has gotten, with six expansion teams joining and one team departing from the league.

== Teams ==
=== Expansion ===
This season saw six expansion teams make their debut in the league. The Nueva Ecija MiGuard join from Central Luzon, while the Mindoro Tamaraws and Bicol Volcanoes became the first teams based in Mimaropa and the Bicol Region, respectively. Western Visayas is the only region with two expansion teams in the Bacolod Master Sardines and Iloilo United Royals. The last expansion team was the Soccsksargen Marlins representing the Soccsksargen region.

Despite the departure of the Mandaluyong El Tigre, which marked the first time a team didn't return to compete, the number of participating teams increased from 26 to 31, currently the most for a single season in league history.

Nueva Ecija was allocated to the North Division, with the other five expansion teams being placed in the South Division. To balance the divisions, the Marikina Shoemasters, Parañaque Patriots, and Rizal Golden Coolers moved to the North Division.

=== Arenas ===
Expansion team
Team switched divisions
New arena

Team	Arena	Capacity
North Division
Bataan Risers	Bataan People's Center	4,000
Bulacan Kuyas	Bulacan Capitol Gymnasium	5,000
Bulacan Kuyas	Baliwag Star Arena	5,000
Bulacan Kuyas	Malolos Sports and Convention Center	5,000
Caloocan Supremos	Caloocan Sports Complex	3,000
Makati Super Crunch	Makati Coliseum	12,000
Manila Stars	San Andres Sports Complex	3,000
Marikina Shoemasters	Marist School Gymnasium	2,500
Marikina Shoemasters	Marikina Sports Center	7,000
Navotas Uni-Pak Sardines	Navotas Sports Complex	1,000
Nueva Ecija Rice Vanguards	No home games	
Pampanga Giant Lanterns	AUF Sports and Cultural Center	3,000
Parañaque Patriots	Olivarez College Gymnasium	3,500
Pasay Voyagers	Cuneta Astrodome	12,000
Pasig Sta. Lucia Realtors	Pasig Sports Center	2,500
Quezon City Capitals	Blue Eagle Gym	7,500
Quezon City Capitals	JCSGO Seed Dome	1,000
Rizal Golden Coolers	Ynares Center	7,400
San Juan Knights	Filoil Flying V Centre	5,500
Val City Carga Backload Solution	Valenzuela Astrodome	3,000
South Division
Bacolod Master Sardines	La Salle Coliseum	8,000
Bacoor City Strikers	Strike Gymansium	1,500
Basilan Steel	Lamitan Capitol Gymansium	3,000
Batangas City Athletics	Batangas City Sports Coliseum	4,000
Batangas City Athletics	Batangas State University Gymnasium	2,500
Bicol Volcanoes	Ibalong Centrum for Recreation	8,000
Bicol Volcanoes	Albay Astrodome	8,000
Biñan City Luxxe White	Alonte Sports Arena	6,500
Biñan City Luxxe White	Santa Rosa Sports Complex	5,700
Cebu Casino Ethyl Alcohol	Hoops Dome	6,500
Cebu Casino Ethyl Alcohol	Aznar Coliseum	7,000
Davao Occidental Tigers	Rizal Memorial Colleges Gymnasium	2,000
Davao Occidental Tigers	Davao City Recreation Center	2,500
Davao Occidental Tigers	USeP Gymnasium and Cultural Center	6,000
Davao Occidental Tigers	RDR Gymnasium	N/A
GenSan Warriors	Lagao Gymnasium	6,000
Iloilo United Royals	University of San Agustin Gymnasium	5,000
Iloilo United Royals	Passi City Arena	2,000
Imus Bandera	Imus City Sports Complex	1,000
Mindoro Tamaraws	No home games	
Muntinlupa Cagers	Muntinlupa Sports Center	3,000
Sarangani Marlins	Sarangani Capitol Gymnasium	N/A
Zamboanga Family's Brand Sardines	Mayor Vitaliano D. Agan Coliseum	12,000
Neutral
Opening ceremonies	SM Mall of Asia Arena	15,000
All-Star Game	SM Mall of Asia Arena	15,000
International Invasion	Hamdan Sports Complex	15,000
International Invasion	Winsport Arena	N/A
Mindanao Invasion	El Salvador City Gymnasium	N/A
2020–21 MPBL playoffs	Subic Bay Gymnasium	N/A^{1}

Notes

1. During the latter part of the 2020–21 MPBL playoffs, all playoff games at the Subic Bay Gymnasium were held behind closed doors due to the COVID-19 pandemic in the Philippines.

=== Name changes ===
- The Cebu City Sharks changed their team name to Cebu Sharks before the start of the season, then later as Cebu Casino Ethyl Alcohol in October 2019
- The Imus Bandera changed their team name to Imus Khaleb Shawarma before the start of the season, then later as Imus Bandera-Luxxe Slim in December 2019
- The Laguna Heroes changed their team name to Biñan City Krah Heroes before the start of the season, then later as Biñan City Luxxe White in November 2019
- The Navotas Clutch changed their team name to Navotas Uni-Pak Sardines in June 2019
- The Valenzuela Classic changed their team name to Valenzuela SPVTOP Marketplace in June 2019, then later as Val City-Carga Backload Solution in November 2019
- The Nueva Ecija MiGuard changed their team name to Nueva Ecija ForestLake in August 2019, then later as Nueva Ecija Rice Vanguards in October 2019
- The Soccsksargen Marlins-Armor On changed their team name to Sarangani Marlins in November 2019

=== Coaching changes ===
Off-season
Team	Outgoing coach	Incoming coach
Bataan Risers	Jojo Lastimosa	Jong Uichico
Batangas City Athletics	Mac Tan	Goldwyn Monteverde
Bacoor Strikers	Leo Issac	Chris Gavina
Imus Khaleb Shawarma	Mike Orquillas	Budds Reyes
Manila Stars	Philip Cezar	Tino Pinat
Muntinlupa Cagers	Jack Azcueta	Richie Melencio
Parañaque Patriots	Monel Kallos	Michael Saguiguit
Pasay Voyagers	Cholo Martin	Marlon Martin
Pasig Sta. Lucia Realtors	Ronjay Enrile	Bong Dela Cruz
Rizal Golden Coolers	Braulio Lim Jr.	Jayvee Gayoso
Valenzuela SPVTOP Marketplace	Juven Formacil	Gerry Esplana
Mid-season
Team	Outgoing coach	Incoming coach
1Bataan Risers	Jong Uichico	Jonas Villanueva
Batangas City Athletics	Goldwyn Monteverde	Woody Co
Binan City Luxxe White	Alex Angeles	Dennis Miranda
Bulacan Kuyas	Britt Reroma	Kerwin McCoy
Cebu Casino Ethyl Alcohol	Titing Manalili	Noynoy Falcasantos
Imus Bandera - Luxxe Slim	Buddz Reyes; Mac Cuan; Eugene Tan	Mac Cuan; Eugene Tan; Raymund Valenzona
GenSan Warriors	Jesus Ramon Pido	Rich Alvarez
Makati Super Crunch	Pocholo Villanueva	Beaujing Acot
Mindoro Tamaraws	Bengie Teodoro	Justin Tan
Muntinlupa Cagers	Richie Melencio; Dave Moralde	Dave Moralde; Bonnie Garcia
Nueva Ecija Rice Vanguards	Eric Gascon; Alvin Grey	Alvin Grey; Charles Tiu
Quezon City Capitals	Vis Valencia	Christian Coronel
Zamboanga Family's Brand Sardines	Raymund Valenzona; Bai Cristobal	Bai Cristobal; Britt Reroma
Sarangani Marlins	Biboy Simon; Bong Melocoton	Bong Melocoton; Manuel Torralba
Val City - Carga Backload Solution	Gerry Esplana	Ronjay Enrile

=== Roster regulation changes ===
After receiving criticism for its previous set of changes, the player limits were increased to allow more players to join the league.

- The Filipino-foreigner player limit was increased from one to two, with the height limit of 6'4" remaining intact. However, only one of them can play at a time.
- The ex-professional player limit was increased from five to seven. However, only five of them can play at a time.

== Opening ceremony ==
The opening ceremony took place on June 12, 2019 at the SM Mall of Asia Arena in Pasay. Some teams had a muse to represent the team, who are as follows:

Team	Muse
Basilan Steel	Sharifa Akeel
Bataan Risers	Rolyn Angela Tungol
Batangas City Athletics	Jeanette Reyes
Davao Occidental Tigers	Vickie Rushton
GenSan Warriors	Pamela Sue
Manila Stars	Ahtisa Manalo
Marikina Shoemasters	Sophie Albert
Mindoro Tamaraws	Princess Legaspi
Navotas Clutch	Anne Tenorio
Pampanga Giant Lanterns	Zara Carbonell
Parañaque Patriots	Nikka Castro
Pasay Voyagers	Rachel May Libres
Pasig Sta. Lucia Realtors	Mikaela Gabrielle Bañares
Quezon City Capitals	Samantha Bernardo
Rizal Golden Coolers	Patricia Reyes
San Juan Knights	Nadine Lustre
Valenzuela Classic	Abby Dizor
Zamboanga Family's Brand Sardines	Joana Tan-Pe

== Regular season ==
=== Format ===
The 31 teams played in a single round-robin format, playing one game against all other teams in the league for a total of 30 games. In each gameday, a series of games is played in a designated home arena, with the home team usually playing in the final game.

The top eight teams in each division advanced to a four-round, single-elimination playoffs, playing in best-of-three series in the first three rounds, and a best-of-five series in the national finals, with homecourt advantage alternating between the higher seeds of each series in the first two rounds.

=== International games ===
For the first time in MPBL history, the league held regular season games in international venues under its existing Invasion series.

Date	Teams	Arena	Location	Ref.
MPBL Dubai Invasion
September 27, 2019	Davao Occidental Tigers vs. Batangas City Athletics	Hamdan Sports Complex	Dubai, United Arab Emirates	
September 28, 2019	Batangas City Athletics vs. Imus Bandera	Hamdan Sports Complex	Dubai, United Arab Emirates	
MPBL Canada Invasion
December 27, 2019	Zamboanga Family's Brand Sardines vs. Imus Bandera	Winsport Arena	Calgary, Alberta, Canada	

=== Standings ===
==== North Division ====
Pos	Team	Pld	W	L	PCT	GB	Qualification
1	San Juan Knights	30	26	4	.867	—	Playoffs
2	Manila Stars	30	25	5	.833	1	Playoffs
3	Makati Super Crunch	30	22	8	.733	4	Playoffs
4	Pampanga Giant Lanterns	30	21	9	.700	5	Playoffs
5	Bataan Risers	30	20	10	.667	6	Playoffs
6	Bulacan Kuyas	30	19	11	.633	7	Playoffs
7	Pasig Sta. Lucia Realtors	30	18	12	.600	8	Playoffs
8	Pasay Voyagers	30	17	13	.567	9	Playoffs
9	Caloocan Supremos	30	16	14	.533	10	
10	Valenzuela Classic	30	11	19	.367	15	
11	Nueva Ecija Rice Vanguards	30	10	20	.333 (Note: Nueva Ecija wins tiebreaker over Quezon City by head-to-head victory.)	16	
12	Quezon City Capitals	30	10	20	.333	16	
13	Marikina Shoemasters	30	8	22	.267 (Note: Marikina wins tiebreaker over Parañaque by head-to-head victory.)	18	
14	Parañaque Patriots	30	8	22	.267	18	
15	Navotas Uni-Pak Sardines	29	7	22	.241	18.5	
16	Rizal Golden Coolers	29	6	23	.207	19.5	

Source: Standings
Rules for classification: 1) Wins; 2a) If two teams are tied, head-to-head match-up; 2b) If three or more teams are tied, head-to-head point quotient; 3) overall point quotient; 4) coin toss.

==== South Division ====
Pos	Team	Pld	W	L	PCT	GB	Qualification
1	Davao Occidental Tigers	30	26	4	.867	—	Playoffs
2	Bacoor City Strikers	30	24	6	.800	2	Playoffs
3	Basilan Steel	30	20	10	.667	6	Playoffs
4	Batangas City Athletics	30	19	11	.633	7	Playoffs
5	Zamboanga Family's Brand Sardines	30	18	12	.600 (Note: Zamboanga (1.071), Iloilo (0.976), and General Santos (0.960) are ranked based on head-to-head point quotient.)	8	Playoffs
6	Iloilo United Royals	30	18	12	.600	8	Playoffs
7	GenSan Warriors	30	18	12	.600	8	Playoffs
8	Bicol Volcanoes	30	16	14	.533	10	Playoffs
9	Cebu Casino Ethyl Alcohol	30	15	15	.500	11	
10	Biñan City Luxxe White	30	12	18	.400	14	
11	Bacolod Master Sardines	30	11	19	.367	15	
12	Mindoro Tamaraws	30	9	21	.300	17	
13	Muntinlupa Cagers	30	7	23	.233	19	
14	Imus Bandera	30	6	24	.200	20	
15	Sarangani Marlins	30	1	29	.033	25	

Source: Standings
Rules for classification: 1) Wins; 2a) If two teams are tied, head-to-head match-up; 2b) If three or more teams are tied, head-to-head point quotient; 3) overall point quotient; 4) coin toss.

=== Results ===
Teams	BCD	BCR	BAS	BAN	BTG	BCL	BIÑ	BUL	CAL	CEB	DVO	GS	ILO	IMS	MKT	MNL	MAR	MDR	MUN	NAV	NE	PAM	PAR	PSY	PSG	QC	RZL	SJ	SAR	VAL	ZAM
Bacolod		100–107**	96–89	64–84	54–63	76–72**	69–68	76–69	74–89	80–85	74–85	68–87	81–89	68–59	74–84	70–87	67–66	87–83	98–86**	69–78	76–82	65–82	78–82	50–61	68–87	68–63	84–89	71–95	89–80	83–78	84–82
Bacoor City			90–92	93–66	67–68	84–80	78–70	78–76	95–94**	88–71	73–70	87–75	79–68	79–57	86–63	74–78	100–88	76–59	98–67	87–78	90–80	69–76	109–56	78–83	73–64	111–79	87–84	76–77	65–60	78–74	83–75
Basilan				83–91	89–101**	83–94	78–94	55–65	82–70	86–78	71–76	85–79	78–74	98–85	80–86	65–66	86–83	105–89	90–79	113–94	93–81	83–74**	89–71	74–59	89–83**	86–78	103–85	86–89	85–82	87–78	78–83
Bataan					69–73	76–72	75–62	79–81**	90–77	65–75	75–83	74–66	78–84	65–61	69–76	76–77	82–76	97–87	86–53	81–78	71–60	77–76	75–56	72–71	63–64	79–73	78–57	79–87**	102–71	86–92**	92–79
Batangas City						71–76	85–95	81–82	80–67	68–56	57–67	85–79	65–59	86–85**	94–89**	50–73	70–66	106–99	79–70	72–68	81–85	79–82**	57–61	61–72	67–62	105–80	76–78	93–88	76–54	77–66	77–67
Bicol							80–75	81–83	73–81	77–67	76–88	65–63	74–77	81–78**	75–83	73–76	86–67	70–74	90–87	88–73	70–58	82–70	79–68	73–68	73–75	89–87	77–79	69–98	86–72	90–81**	84–80
Biñan City								82–87	72–68	85–81**	66–72	76–100	63–67	88–83	87–92	93–106	82–72	95–82	90–102	98–110	98–90	86–96	70–73	57–68	75–82	85–110	92–82	84–89	94–72	89–84	74–72
Bulacan									81–79	75–71	75–91	77–81	73–83	75–70	76–74	72–93	81–79	74–69	77–62	105–104**	78–85	63–69	76–69	100–98**	72–77	78–70	75–61	88–90	76–69	95–79	59–60
Caloocan										70–54	69–76	79–70	63–90	75–78**	77–119	72–65	76–74	93–90	63–62	97–96	92–90	70–76	90–75	78–72	87–89	84–87	92–78	89–111	93–77	76–65	83–74
Cebu											61–65	72–66	69–68	101–76	67–73	91–86**	50–42	73–94	79–62	83–71	77–73	77–88	79–70	74–82	68–78	95–89	89–59	69–88	89–57	66–69	74–70
Davao Occidental												84–75	89–76	94–78	101–79	79–76	85–83	99–84	106–90	94–74	86–79	62–65	78–70	69–67	75–71	90–82	86–55	65–84	104–75	65–67	84–82
General Santos													69–64	75–73	90–91**	72–79	96–89	88–80	84–61	87–76	80–75	85–94	78–67	76–69	91–82	124–103	70–69	97–91	104–87	93–87	52–62
Iloilo														73–69**	71–78	88–85	70–55	68–70	92–96	72–67	92–90	76–70	67–64	52–56	79–65	80–84	71–65	67–70	96–86	73–67	60–58
Imus															64–69	58–85	86–89	88–86	86–90	86–71	75–73	82–99	77–81	65–82	88–93	93–105	79–77**	68–97	82–70	67–73	72–88
Makati																56–64	85–70	97–65	81–68	67–62	74–80	96–94	91–71	61–79	101–87	85–91	73–51	86–88	106–70	78–61	111–106**
Manila																	107–95	133–101	76–57	96–91	96–86	92–76	106–78	73–72	69–56	85–86	116–89	75–70	104–89	71–66	74–71
Marikina																		75–80	85–75	88–80	76–78	69–95	89–82	66–70	63–69	76–77**	87–86	73–87	99–95	70–65	62–74
Mindoro																			76–85	57–72	79–78	78–85	63–61	72–84	76–75	62–72	74–73	68–114	91–87	59–67	64–84
Muntinlupa																				83–89	82–85	66–77	87–78	75–76**	76–98	106–100	66–70	63–91	58–55	83–97	63–75
Navotas																					125–97	74–83	71–82	68–70	100–107	97–98*	– (Note: The Navotas–Rizal game was stopped at halftime for player safety. The game was not resumed due to it having no effect on playoff standings. Final score was 56–39 in favor of Rizal.)	95–112	88–82	88–83	65–80
Nueva Ecija																						75–81	85–81	69–75	72–85	92–74	84–71	95–109	89–50	116–119**	85–109
Pampanga																							82–63	75–65	71–62	75–81	90–70	97–102**	115–71	77–74	59–73
Parañaque																								60–79	87–100	83–85	101–70	65–81	73–70	89–83	65–74
Pasay																									68–71	92–89	74–69	72–74	70–54	61–77	82–83
Pasig																										92–81	78–72	99–109	89–77	90–72	69–82
Quezon City																											62–72	71–89	74–78	65–70	60–71
Rizal																												86–101	77–73	77–81	76–95
San Juan																													100–77	78–68	64–69
Sarangani																														84–89	75–100
Valenzuela																															78–85
Zamboanga																															

Source: Schedule
Legend: Blue = left column team win; Red = top row team win.
Matches with lighter background shading were decided after overtime.
Notes:

Not all games are in home–away format. Each team plays every team once. Number of asterisks after each score denotes number of overtimes played.

== Playoffs ==
Teams in bold advanced to the next round. The numbers to the left of each team indicate the team's seeding in its division, and the numbers to the right indicate the number of games the team won in that round. Teams with home court advantage, the higher seeded team, are shown in italics.

Division quarterfinals (best-of-3)	Division semifinals (best-of-3)
N1	**San Juan**	**2**
N8	Pasay	0
N1	**San Juan**	**2**
N4	Pampanga	0
N4	**Pampanga**	**2**
N5	Bataan	0
**North Division**
N2	**Manila**	**2**
N7	Pasig	0
N2	Manila	1
N3	**Makati**	**2**
N3	**Makati**	**2**
N6	Bulacan	0
S1	**Davao Occidental**	**2**
S8	Bicol	1
S1	**Davao Occidental**	**2**
S5	Zamboanga	0
S4	Batangas City	1
S5	**Zamboanga**	**2**
**South Division**
S2	**Bacoor City**	**2**
S7	General Santos	0
S2	Bacoor City	1
S3	**Basilan**	**2**
S3	**Basilan**	**2**
S6	Iloilo	0

Division finals (best-of-3)
N1	**San Juan**	**2**
N3	Makati	1
S1	**Davao Occidental**	**2**
S3	Basilan	1

National finals (best-of-5)
N1	San Juan	1
S1	**Davao Occidental**	**3**

=== First Round ===
In the First Round, the first- and second-seeded teams host games 1 and 3 of its respective division, while the third- and fourth-seeded teams host game 2.

==== North Division First Round ====
Team 1	Series	Team 2	Game 1	Game 2	Game 3
**(1) San Juan Knights**	2–0	(8) Pasay Voyagers	**75**–74	**74**–67	—
**(2) Manila Stars**	2–0	(7) Pasig Sta. Lucia Realtors	**91**–88	**82**–80	—
**(3) Makati Super Crunch**	2–0	(6) Bulacan Kuyas	**94**–88	**86**–78	—
**(4) Pampanga Giant Lanterns**	2–0	(5) Bataan Risers	**71**–64	**83**–80	—

==== South Division first round ====
Team 1	Series	Team 2	Game 1	Game 2	Game 3
**(1) Davao Occidental Tigers**	2–1	(8) Bicol Volcanoes	**77**–71	81–**84**	**64**–56 (OT)
**(2) Bacoor City Strikers**	2–0	(7) GenSan Warriors	**95**–72	**69**–60	—
**(3) Basilan Steel**	2–0	(6) Iloilo United Royals	**83**–68	**70**–63	—
(4) Batangas City Athletics	1–2	**(5) Zamboanga Family's Brand Sardines**	74–**78**	**84**–75	52–**69**

=== Division semifinals ===
In the Division Semifinals, the highest seeded team hosts games 1 and 3, while the second-highest seeded team hosts game 2.

==== North Division semifinals ====
Due to San Juan advancing after game 2, Manila instead hosted game 3.

Team 1	Series	Team 2	Game 1	Game 2	Game 3
**(1) San Juan Knights**	2–0	(4) Pampanga Giant Lanterns	**86**–84	**91**–83	—
(2) Manila Stars	1–2	**(3) Makati Super Crunch**	**77**–74	59–**75**	75–**78** (OT)

==== South Division semifinals ====
Team 1	Series	Team 2	Game 1	Game 2	Game 3
**(1) Davao Occidental Tigers**	2–0	(5) Zamboanga Family's Brand Sardines	**47**–28	**62**–58	—
(2) Bacoor City Strikers	1–2	**(3) Basilan Steel**	63–**77**	**80**–69	76–**84**

=== Division finals ===
Under standard rules, in the division finals, the higher-seeded team hosts games 1 and 3 in its respective division, while the lower-seeded team hosts game 2.

Due to the COVID-19 pandemic, the playoffs had to be suspended after both game 2s were played. The suspension lasted for a year, until the league were cleared by the Inter-Agency Task Force for the Management of Emerging Infectious Diseases (IATF-EID) to host a bubble at the Subic Bay Gymnasium in Olongapo, Zambales, where all remaining games were played.

==== North Division finals ====
Due to the COVID-19 pandemic, San Juan ended up hosting games 1 and 2, the latter being held behind closed doors. Game 3 was held at a neutral site in the Subic Bay Gymnasium.

Team 1	Series	Team 2	Game 1	Game 2	Game 3
**(1) San Juan Knights**	2–1	(3) Makati Super Crunch	**76**–60	88–**91**	**131**–54

==== South Division finals ====
Due to the COVID-19 pandemic, game 3 would've been held at a neutral site in the Subic Bay Gymnasium.

However, game 3 was defaulted because multiple Basilan Steel members were tested positive for COVID-19 inside the bubble. Thus the game and the series was won by Davao Occidental as the Tigers advanced to the MPBL finals.

Team 1	Series	Team 2	Game 1	Game 2	Game 3
**(1) Davao Occidental Tigers**	2–1	(3) Basilan Steel	72–**74**	**81**–76	**2**–0 (default)

=== MPBL finals ===
Neither team had homecourt advantage due to all games being held at the Subic Bay Gymnasium.

Team 1	Series	Team 2	Game 1	Game 2	Game 3	Game 4	Game 5
(N1) San Juan Knights	1–3	**(S1) Davao Occidental Tigers**	75–**77** (OT)	**70**–65	58–**66**	88–**89** (OT)	—

== All-Star Game ==
2020 MPBL All-Star Game
North All-Stars	South All-Stars
122	126
Head coach: Randy Alcantara (San Juan Knights)	Head coach: Don Dulay (Davao Occidental Tigers)
	1	2	3	4	OT	Total
North All-Stars	23	28	28	33	10	122
South All-Stars	28	23	29	32	14	126
- Date: February 13, 2020
- Venue: SM Mall of Asia Arena, Pasay
- MVP: Jeff Viernes

The 2020 MPBL All-Star Game was an exhibition game played on February 13, 2020. It was the second edition of the MPBL All-Star Game, which took place at SM Mall of Asia Arena in Pasay, the same venue as the previous edition.

For the second consecutive season, South Division won against the North Division with a score of 126–122 in overtime. Jeff Viernes was also declared the All-Star Game MVP for the second time in a row.

=== Lineups ===
Out of the 30 players selected, eight of them made their second all-star appearance. Those being Cedric Ablaza of the Makati Super Crunch, Gerald Anderson of the Imus Bandera, Gab Banal of the Bacoor City Strikers, Aris Dionisio of the Manila Stars, Paulo Hubalde of Val City Carga Backload Solution, Jay-R Taganas of the Bulacan Kuyas, Jeff Viernes of the Batangas City Athletics, and Mark Yee of the Davao Occidental Tigers.

North All-Stars
Pos	Player	Team	No. of selections
Starters
	Alfred Batino	Bataan Risers	1
	Aris Dionisio	Manila Stars	2
	Michael Juico	Pampanga Giant Lanterns	1
	Jai Reyes	Nueva Ecija Rice Vanguards	1
	John Wilson	San Juan Knights	1
Reserves
	Cedric Ablaza	Makati Super Crunch	2
	Mark Benitez	Rizal Golden Coolers	1
	Clark Derige	Quezon City Capitals	1
	Paulo Hubalde	Val City Carga Backload Solution	2
	Dhon Reverente	Pasay Voyagers	1
	Paul Sanga	Caloocan Supremos	1
	Jayboy Solis	Parañaque Patriots	1
	Jay-R Taganas	Bulacan Kuyas	2
	Marwin Taywan	Navotas Uni-Pak Sardines	1
	Jeric Teng	Pasig Sta. Lucia Realtors	1
	Ato Ular	Marikina Shoemasters	1
Head coach: Randy Alcantara (San Juan Knights)

South All-Stars
Pos	Player	Team	No. of selections
Starters
	Gab Banal	Bacoor City Strikers	2
	Allyn Bulanadi	Basilan Steel	1
	Will McAloney	Cebu Casino Ethyl Alcohol	1
	Jeff Viernes	Batangas City Athletics	2
	Mark Yee	Davao Occidental Tigers	2
Reserves
	Gerald Anderson	Imus Bandera	2
	Ronjay Buenafe	Bicol Volcanoes	1
	Robby Celiz	GenSan Warriors	1
	Richard Escoto	Iloilo United Royals	1
	Pao Javelona	Bacolod Master Sardines	1
	Pari Llagas	Sarangani Marlins	1
	Allan Mangahas	Biñan City Luxxe White	1
	Alvin Pasaol	Zamboanga Family's Brand Sardines	1
	Rodel Vaygan	Mindoro Tamaraws	1
	GJ Ylagan	Muntinlupa Cagers	1
Head coach: Don Dulay (Davao Occidental)

=== Game ===
S+A

February 13

North All-Stars	122–126 (OT)	South All-Stars
Scoring by quarter: 23–28, 28–23, 28–29, 33–32, Overtime: 10–14
Pts: Michael Juico 23		Pts: Jeff Viernes 28

Mall of Asia Arena, Pasay

=== Pre-game events ===
Before the game itself, a series of pre-game events were held. Returning events include the executives' Game, Three-Point Shootout and the Slam Dunk Contest.

- Three-Point Shootout Champion: Lester Alvarez (Bulacan Kuyas)
- Slam Dunk Contest Champion: David Carlos (Makati Super Crunch)

== Impact of the COVID-19 pandemic ==
On March 12, 2020, the league announced the suspension of the 2019–20 season due to the impending COVID-19 pandemic. The league had just concluded with the second games of both division finals series, with both series being forced into a do-or-die third game. Commissioner Kenneth Duremdes stated in June that the suspended playoffs would continue once restrictions on contact sports have been lifted by the government. The suspension lasted nearly one year, as the league announced on March 6, 2021 that it would finally resume its 2020 playoffs in a bio-secure bubble at the Subic Bay Gymnasium on March 10. The 2020–21 season was also cancelled, with the league instead intending to start its fourth season in June 2021 before ultimately settling for 2022.

== Awards ==
=== Individual season awards ===
Most of the league's individual awards were given out before game 4 of the national finals at the Subic Bay Gymnasium. The Finals Most Valuable Player and Coach of the Year were awarded at the conclusion of the series.

Award	Recipient	Team
Most Valuable Player	John Wilson	San Juan Knights
Finals Most Valuable Player	Mark Yee	Davao Occidental Tigers
Defensive Player of the Year	Mark Yee	Davao Occidental Tigers
Sportsmanship award	Billy Ray Robles	Davao Occidental Tigers

=== All-MPBL teams ===
All-MPBL First Team
Player	Team
John Wilson	San Juan Knights
Mike Ayonayon	San Juan Knights
Mark Yee	Davao Occidental Tigers
Jeric Teng	Pasig Sta. Lucia Realtors
Jeckster Apinan	Makati Super Crunch

All-MPBL Second Team
Player	Team
Gab Banal	Bacoor City Strikers
John Raymundo	GenSan Warriors
Aris Dionisio	Manila Stars
Chris Bitoon	Manila Stars
Dhon Reverente	Pasay Voyagers

=== Players of the Week ===
Week	Player	Ref.
June 12−15, 2019	Mark Cruz (Pampanga Giant Lanterns)	
June 17−22, 2019	Aris Dionisio (Manila Stars)	
June 24−29, 2019	Aaron Black (Quezon City Capitals)	
July 1–6, 2019	Allan Mangahas (Biñan City Heroes)	
July 8–13, 2019		
July 15–20, 2019	Mark Yee (Davao Occidental Tigers)	
July 22–27, 2019		
July 29 – August 3, 2019	Edzel Mag-isa (Muntinlupa Cagers)	
August 5–10, 2019	Jeric Teng (Pasig Sta. Lucia Realtors)	
August 12–17, 2019		
August 19–24, 2019		
August 26–31, 2019		
September 2–7, 2019	Michael Juico (Pampanga Giant Lanterns)	
September 9–14, 2019		
September 16–21, 2019		
September 23–28, 2019		
September 30 – October 5, 2019		
October 7–12, 2019	RJ Ramirez (Bacoor City Strikers)	

== Notable events ==
- On November 4, 2019, the league suspended the Soccsksargen Marlins team due to allegations of game-fixing, as part of the league's greater crackdown on the issue. The team was later turned over to new management and was renamed to the Sarangani Marlins. Two years later, criminal charges were filed against the members involved.

== Records and milestones ==
=== Milestones ===
- January 11, 2020 – John Wilson becomes the 1st ever player to reach 1,000 MPBL career points.
- February 12, 2020 – Yves Sazon becomes the 2nd player to reach 1,000 MPBL career points.
- March 9, 2020 – Mark Yee becomes the 3rd player to reach 1,000 MPBL career points.
- March 11, 2020 – Juneric Baloria becomes the 4th player to reach 1,000 MPBL career points.

== Media ==
This season marked the third and final year of both ABS-CBN's and Fox Sports Asia's broadcast rights with the league.

For ABS-CBN, games were broadcast on S+A, Liga, and The Filipino Channel, while iWantTFC served as the network's international streaming platform. A2Z also broadcast the bubble games of the 2020–21 playoffs. The network's broadcast rights came to an end after the network's franchise was expired. On the other hand, Fox Sports Asia continued to broadcast Monday games as the league's cable partner. The network itself shut down on October 1, 2021.

IBC and TAP DMV would take over the television rights in the 2021 Invitational, while Cignal TV acquired the rights beginning with the succeeding 2022 season.

The league continued to broadcast all of the games on its official Facebook page.
