= Mark Yee =

Filipino basketball player

No. 83 – Rizal Golden Coolers
- Position: Power forward / center
- League: MPBL

Personal information
- Born: January 4, 1982 (age 44) Sagay City, Negros Occidental, Philippines
- Listed height: 6 ft 3 in (1.91 m)
- Listed weight: 170 lb (77 kg)

Career information
- College: San Sebastian College (Cavite)
- PBA draft: 2008: Undrafted
- Playing career: 2008–present

Career history
- 2008–2009: Burger King Whoppers
- 2009–2011: Talk 'N Text Tropang Texters
- 2011–2012: Meralco Bolts
- 2012–2014: GlobalPort Batang Pier
- 2015–2018: Kia Carnival / Mahindra Enforcer / Mahindra Floodbuster / Kia Picanto / Columbian Dyip
- 2018–2021: Davao Occidental Tigers
- 2021: Bicol Volcanoes
- 2022: All-Star Bacolod Ballers / Bacolod Bingo Plus
- 2022–2023: Sta. Rosa Laguna Lions
- 2023: Bacoor City Strikers
- 2024: Parañaque Patriots
- 2024–2025: Abra Solid North Weavers
- 2026–present: Rizal Golden Coolers

Career highlights
- 2× PBA champion (2010–11 Philippine, 2011 Commissioner's); 2× MPBL champion (2020, 2025); MPBL Finals MVP (2020); 2× MPBL Defensive Player of the Year (2020, 2022); 2× All-MPBL First Team (2019, 2020); 3× MPBL All-Star (2019, 2020, 2022)

Mark Yee (born January 4, 1982) is a Filipino professional basketball player for the Rizal Golden Coolers of the Maharlika Pilipinas Basketball League (MPBL).

A two-time Philippine Basketball Association champion, Yee has seen much success after joining the MPBL in 2018, where he won Finals MVP with the Davao Occidental Tigers in 2021. He is also the only player in MPBL history to notch two Defensive Player of the Year awards. He also has three all-star selections on top of his two appearances in the All-MPBL First Team.

== PBA career ==
Mark Yee declared for the PBA draft in 2008, but wasn't picked. He would still take part in PBA action after joining the Burger King Whoppers. He would continue to play in the PBA until 2018 where he last played with the Columbian Dyip.

== Post-PBA career ==
=== Davao Occidental Tigers (2018–2021) ===
In 2018, Yee joining the Davao Occidental Tigers of the Maharlika Pilipinas Basketball League (MPBL), and immediately became a key player for the team in the 2018–19 season, earning an all-star appearance and an All-MPBL First Team selection. He led the team to a national finals appearance in 2019 where they lost to the San Juan Knights in 2019. In the following season, Yee continued to lead the way for Davao Occidental. That season, Yee earned his second all-star selection, second All-MPBL First Team selection, and also won the MPBL Defensive Player of the Year award as he led the team back to the national finals. Once again facing the rival San Juan, Davao Occidental led the series 2–1 after the first three games. In game 4, with the Tigers trailing by two points, Yee scored a three-pointer from the left wing that would clinch the title for Davao Occidental.

=== All-Star Bacolod Ballers / Bacolod Bingo Plus (2022) ===
After a brief stint with the Bicol Volcanoes in the 2021 MPBL Invitational, Yee then joined the All-Star Bacolod Ballers, who at the time, are set to take part in FilBasket's Summer Championship. He stayed with the team in time for their entry in the 2022 MPBL season. In August that year, Yee would become the first player in MPBL history to record 1,000 rebounds. He also claimed his third all-star selection and also became the first player to earn two Defensive Player of the Year awards after leading Bacolod to their playoff series win against the GenSan Warriors.

=== Bacoor City Strikers (2023) ===
After yet another short stint with the Santa Rosa Laguna Lions of Pilipinas Super League's (PSL) DUMPER Cup, Yee made another move in the MPBL by joining the Bacoor City Strikers. Despite the lack of an all-star selection, he still played a role in Bacoor's run to the 2023 MPBL finals against the Pampanga Giant Lanterns, the same team Yee lost to whilst with Santa Rosa in the PSL. The Strikers would end up getting swept by PGL in three games.

=== Parañaque Patriots and Abra Weavers (2024) ===
As the Strikers departed from the MPBL, Yee joined the Parañaque Patriots for the 2024 MPBL season. In June 2024, Yee was released by the team and later signed with the Abra Weavers.

== PBA career statistics ==
Legend
GP	Games played	MPG	Minutes per game
FG%	Field-goal percentage	3P%	3-point field-goal percentage	FT%	Free-throw percentage
RPG	Rebounds per game	APG	Assists per game	SPG	Steals per game
BPG	Blocks per game	PPG	Points per game	**Bold**	Career high

Correct as of September 24, 2016

=== Season-by-season averages ===
Year	Team	GP	MPG	FG%	3P%	FT%	RPG	APG	SPG	BPG	PPG
2008–09	Burger King	15	**19.5**	.483	**.387**	.800	3.9	**1.4**	.1	.4	**8.8**
2009–10	Burger King / Talk 'N Text	**42**	14.1	.392	.343	.627	2.5	.7	.3	.4	5.2
2010–11	Talk 'N Text	23	5.0	.469	.273	.750	.7	.4	.0	.0	2.7
2011–12	Meralco	18	11.4	.377	.231	.875	1.4	.7	.1	.2	3.3
2012–13	GlobalPort	31	14.7	.420	.250	.727	3.1	.5	.2	.1	4.2
2013–14	GlobalPort	19	13.6	.397	.333	**.909**	2.5	.6	.2	.2	3.2
2014–15	Kia	20	16.9	**.500**	.286	.684	4.3	.6	.2	.1	5.0
2015–16	Mahindra	35	16.1	.442	.231	.831	**4.9**	.7	**.7**	**.6**	6.7
Career		203	13.9	.432	.301	.759	3.0	.7	.3	.3	4.9
