= Imus Bandera =

Professional basketball team in Imus, Cavite, Philippines

- 2026 Imus Bandera season
- League: MPBL (2018–present)
- Founded: 2018; 8 years ago
- History: Imus Bandera; 2018–2022, 2026–present Imus Khaleb Shawarma; 2019; Boracay Islanders; 2022–2023; Imus SV Squad; 2023; Imus Agimat; 2024; Imus Braderhood; 2025
- Arena: Imus Sports Complex
- Location: Imus, Cavite
- Team colors
- Main sponsor: Yang Kee Logistics
- Head coach: Yani Magpantay

The Imus Bandera (also known as Imus Bandera–Yang Kee Logistics for sponsorship reasons) is a Philippine professional basketball team based in Imus, Cavite. The team currently competes in the Maharlika Pilipinas Basketball League (MPBL) as a member of the league's South Division. The team most recently played its home games at Imus Sports Complex.

The team joined in 2018 as a charter team of the MPBL. The name is a reference to Imus being known as the "flag capital of the Philippines". The Agimat is one of five teams and based in Calabarzon and previously shared the province of Cavite with the Bacoor City Strikers from 2018 to 2023.

== History ==
=== 2018–2023: Original franchise ===
Logo of the Imus SV Squad used in 2023.

The team began play in 2018 as one of the ten founding teams of the Maharlika Pilipinas Basketball League. The team lost a tiebreaker to the Bataan Defenders that would have given it the final playoff spot. In the 2018–19 season, Imus would make its first playoff appearance, but lost to the Batangas City Athletics in the First Round. In the 2019–20 season, the team ended the season with a record of 6-24, the second-worst in the league.

The team saw potential in the 2021 Invitational, after leading 4-1 in Group D, they would go on to finish in fourth place. However, in the following 2022 season, the team finished ninth in the Southern Division, once again failing to make the playoffs.

During the 2023 season, Imus have acquired nine-time PBA champion Marc Pingris, making it his first stint in professional basketball since he announced his retirement. The SV Squad finished 7th in the South Division with a 15–13, their best season by win percentage, but would fall once again to Batangas City Embassy Chill in the Division Quarterfinals.

=== 2024: Current franchise ===
Logo of the Imus Agimat used in 2024.

After the 2023 season, the SV Squad organization would leave Imus for Biñan to form a new team, the Biñan Tatak Gel. Imus' slot in the MPBL would be filled in with a new team, known as the Imus Agimat.

=== 2025-present ===
For the 2025 season, the team changed their name as the Imus Braderhood due to sponsorship reason.

For the 2026 season, the team reverted back the name as the Imus Bandera.

== Home venues ==
In their four of the first five seasons, the Imus Braderhood have always played their home games in Imus Sports Complex.

Venue	Location	2018	2018–19	2019–20	2022	2023	2024	2025
Imus Sports Complex	Imus	✓	✓	✓	✗	✓	✗	✗

== Current roster ==
Imus Bandera roster
Players

Pos.	No.	Name	Height	Weight	DOB	From
F	1	Joewish Garcia	6 ft 4 in (1.93 m)			Centro Escolar
F	4	Jackson Corpuz	6 ft 4 in (1.93 m)	180 lb (82 kg)	1989–02–08	Philippine Christian
F	6	Joseph Marquez	6 ft 2 in (1.88 m)			OLFU
G	7	Miguel Magpantay	5 ft 9 in (1.75 m)			Philippine Christian
G	11	John Jezer Calma	6 ft 3 in (1.91 m)			MLQU
G	13	Meray Yamada	5 ft 8 in (1.73 m)			Philippine Christian
G	14	Noel Santos	5 ft 8 in (1.73 m)			Philippine Christian
F	15	John Russell Fuentes	5 ft 9 in (1.75 m)			St. Clare
G	17	Jethro Sombrero	6 ft 3 in (1.91 m)		1996–05–13	Diliman
F	18	Dylan Darbin	5 ft 8 in (1.73 m)			Philippine Christian
G	20	Jordan Rios	6 ft 0 in (1.83 m)		1991–01–14	St. Clare
G	22	John Michael Malones	5 ft 6 in (1.68 m)			AMA
G	23	Harold Lomtong	5 ft 8 in (1.73 m)			Centro Escolar
G	27	Justine Padua	5 ft 8 in (1.73 m)			José Rizal
G	30	Ian Pardo	5 ft 9 in (1.75 m)			Far Eastern
G	41	Patrick Alindoy	5 ft 8 in (1.73 m)			Philippine Christian
G	55	Ghed Ong	5 ft 9 in (1.75 m)		1987–04–23	Lyceum
F	61	Jaypee Belencion	6 ft 2 in (1.88 m)	176 lb (80 kg)	1986–01–02	Letran
F	66	Janjan Salazar	6 ft 3 in (1.91 m)			St. Clare
F	76	Patrick Dale Beltran	6 ft 10 in (2.08 m)
F	83	Paul Christian Ferrer	6 ft 9 in (2.06 m)
F	91	John Ryan Pascual	5 ft 8 in (1.73 m)			Philippine Christian

Coaches

Head coach

- Yani Magpantay

Assistant coach(es)

- Albert Rabe
- Mike Orquillas
- Abelard Macaray
- Maui Bernabe
- R.J. Rizada

Team manager

- Yani Magpantay

Legend

- (HG) Homegrown
- (FF) Filipino-foreigner
- (EA) EASL player
- (RS) Reserve player
- (S) Suspended
- Injured

- Roster – via Genius Sports
Updated as of: June 22, 2026

=== Head coaches ===
Imus Bandera head coaches
#	Name	Start	End	Achievements	Ref.
1	Nandy Garcia	2018	2018	—	
2	Jerry Codiñera	2018	2018	—	
3	Mike Orquillas	2018	2019	—	
4	Noynoy Falcasantos	2019	2019	—	
5	Jonathan Reyes	2019	2019	—	
6	Mac Cuan	2019	2019	—	
7	Eugene Tan	2019	2020	—	
8	Raymund Valenzona	2019–20	2020	—	
9	Manuel Torralba, Jr.	2021	2022	—	
10	Renniel Cabrera	2022	2022	—	
11	Jinino Manansala	2023	2023	—	
12	Jun Da Jose	2024	2024	—	
13	Eric Sy	2024	2024	—	
14	Brit Reroma	2025	2025	—	
15	Michael Calomot	2026	2026	—	
16	Yani Magpantay	2026	current	—	

== Notable players ==
=== MPBL All-Star Day ===
All-Star selections

- Ian Melencio – 2019
- Gerald Anderson – 2020
- Leo Najorda – 2022
- Poypoy Actub – 2023
- Jimboy Estrada – 2023

Pre-game event winners

- Garex Puerto – Slam Dunk Contest (2022)

=== PBA players ===
Ex-PBA players

- Chad Alonzo
- M.C. Caceres
- JR Cawaling
- Andrian Celada
- Jackson Corpuz
- Barkley Eboña
- Bryan Faundo
- Jerwin Gaco
- Marvin Hayes
- Jayjay Helterbrand
- Carlo Lastimosa
- James Martinez
- Khasim Mirza
- Leo Najorda
- Marc Pingris

Drafted to PBA

- Simon Camacho – 34th overall, 2019
- Andre Paras – 27th overall, season 47

=== Other notable players ===
- Gerald Anderson

== Season-by-season records ==
League champions
Division champions
Qualified for playoffs
Best regular season record

Season	Regular season							Playoffs	
Season	Division	Finish	GP	W	L	PCT	GB	Stage	Results
Imus Bandera
2018; Rajah Cup	None	9th	9	2	7	.222	6	Did not qualify	
2018–19; Datu Cup	South	7th	25	11	14	.440	9	Division quarterfinals	lost vs. Batangas City, 1–2
2019–20; Lakan Season	South	14th	30	6	24	.200	20	Did not qualify	
Imus City Bandera
2022	South	9th	21	5	16	.238	13	Did not qualify	
Imus SV Squad
2023	South	7th	28	15	13	.536	8	Division quarterfinals	lost vs. Batangas City, 0–2
Imus Agimat
2024	South	14th	28	2	26	.071	19	Did not qualify	
Imus Braderhood
2025	South	13th	29	9	20	.310	19	Did not qualify	
Imus Bandera
2026	South	10th	25	4	21	.160	17	Clinched play-in; did not qualify playoffs	
All-time regular season record			195	54	141	.277		2 playoff appearances	
All-time playoff record			5	1	4	.200		0 Finals appearances	
All-time overall record			200	55	145	.275		0 championships	
