= Bacolod Masskara =

Basketball team in Bacolod, Philippines

- 2026 Bacolod Masskara season
- League: MPBL (2019–present); FilBasket (2022)
- Founded: 2019; 7 years ago
- History: Bacolod Master Sardines; 2019–2020; All-Star Bacolod Ballers; 2021–2022; Bacolod Bingo Plus; 2022; Bacolod City of Smiles; 2023–2024; Bacolod Tubo Slashers; 2025; Bacolod Masskara; 2026–present
- Arena: La Salle Coliseum (last used in 2022)
- Location: Bacolod
- Team colors
- Head coach: Lency Aransazo

The Bacolod Masskara are a Filipino professional basketball team based in Bacolod. The team competes in the Maharlika Pilipinas Basketball League (MPBL) as a member of the league's South Division. The team most recently played its home games at La Salle Coliseum.

The team was founded as the Bacolod Master Sardines when it began play in the 2019–20 season and has since undergone multiple monikers. They also took part in FilBasket during the 2022 Summer Championship.

The Bacolod franchise is one of four teams based in Visayas, the other being the Cebu Greats and Iloilo United Royals, and were one of the two MPBL teams representing the Negros Island Region along with the Negros Hacienderos.

== History ==
=== Maharlika Pilipinas Basketball League ===
The Bacolod Master Sardines joined the MPBL as an expansion team for the 2019–20 season, becoming one of the first two teams from Western Visayas alongside fellow expansion side Iloilo United Royals. In its inaugural season, Bacolod finished 11–19, 11th in the South Division.

In the 2021 MPBL Invitational, the team entered as the All-Star Bacolod Ballers and was drawn into Group A alongside future expansion team Negros Muscovados. In the group stage, the All-Star Ballers finished 3–2, finishing third in the group, failing to make the playoffs.

In the 2022 season, reigning Finals MVP Mark Yee joined Bacolod. Yee helped bring the team to its first playoff appearance, finished 5th in the South Division with a 14–7 record. Yee went on to win Defensive Player of the Year honors. The team beat fourth-seeded GenSan in the First Round, and forced a Game 3 against first-seeded Zamboanga in the Division Semifinals but ended up losing that game. Before the 2023 season, some of its players, including Yee and Jhan Nermal left the team to join the Bacoor City Strikers. Bacolod dropped to 9th, one game behind 8th-seeded Iloilo to once again miss the playoffs with an 11–17 record.

In 2024, nine-time PBA champion Alex Cabagnot joined as head coach of the team, but ended up not playing for the team and left for the Converge FiberXers mid-season.

On January 3, 2025, amid reports of tryouts happening for a new Bacolod team for the upcoming 2025 season, the league clarified that it does not recognize such team for next season. The Bacolod franchise would continue competing for the 2025 season.

For the 2026 season, the team changed their name to Bacolod Masskara. On July 30, the MPBL suspended the team's franchise for the rest of the season following allegations of game manipulation during a July 28 game against the Bulacan Kuyas. It also issued a permanent ban on Bacolod Masskara players and coaches involved in the incident.

=== FilBasket ===
The team was invited to FilBasket for its 2022 Summer Championship before beginning its 2022 MPBL campaign. Bacolod finished third in the elimination round with seven wins and made the semifinals before losing to the Nueva Ecija Capitals in two games.

== Team identity ==
The team's current identity derives from Bacolod's moniker as the "City of Smiles" in the country. The alternate name, Maskaras, alludes to the MassKara Festival which is held in Bacolod city.

== Roster ==
Bacolod Masskara roster
Players

Pos.	No.	Name	Height	Weight	DOB	From
G	1	John Edward Veloso (HG)	5 ft 8 in (1.73 m)		2000–02–12	Philippine Christian
G	2	Emman Galman	6 ft 2 in (1.88 m)		2002-03-20	UST
G	5	Marjun Wahing	6 ft 0 in (1.83 m)		1999–04–20	PATTS
G	7	Kobe Dalisay (HG)	6 ft 0 in (1.83 m)			Mapúa
G	8	RR Garcia	5 ft 11 in (1.80 m)	165 lb (75 kg)	1990-01-12	Far Eastern
F	9	Kurt Lactaotao	6 ft 2 in (1.88 m)		2002-09-12	Guang Ming
F	10	Miguel Villarete (HG)	6 ft 2 in (1.88 m)			Centro Escolar
F/C	11	Harley Ching (FF)	6 ft 4 in (1.93 m)			Grace Christian
G	12	Cade Ronzone (FF)	6 ft 2 in (1.88 m)		2001–01–09	Adamson
F	13	Jeremy Monton	6 ft 2 in (1.88 m)			Lyceum
F	15	Ram Mesqueriola	6 ft 4 in (1.93 m)		2002–09–18	Philippine Christian
G	16	Vong Dangiwan	6 ft 0 in (1.83 m)			USLS
F	17	Adrian Lopez (HG)	6 ft 2 in (1.88 m)			Centro Escolar
G	22	Joshua Bongon	5 ft 8 in (1.73 m)			UE
G	23	Desmond Price (FF)	6 ft 3 in (1.91 m)		1998–11–10	Illinois Tech
G/F	24	Miguel Laban (HG)	6 ft 2 in (1.88 m)			USLS
F/C	26	Khenth Guiab	6 ft 2 in (1.88 m)		1998-09-14	Calayan Educational Foundation
F	27	Hance Lleva	6 ft 2 in (1.88 m)			Philippine Christian
G	28	Joshua Jamias	6 ft 1 in (1.85 m)		2003-08-30	Guang Ming College
G	29	Louis Lim (HG)	5 ft 9 in (1.75 m)			USLS
G	32	Austin Ronzone (FF)	6 ft 2 in (1.88 m)		2001–01–09	Adamson
F/C	33	Jethro Ting (HG)	6 ft 4 in (1.93 m)			USLS
C	35	Lex Teruel	6 ft 6 in (1.98 m)			San Beda
F	55	Rafael Go	6 ft 4 in (1.93 m)			Letran
G	66	Christopher Paul Rivas	5 ft 11 in (1.80 m)			Trace

Coaches

Head coach

- Lency Aransazo

Assistant coach(es)

- Leo Mampusti
- Ted Alamarez
- Aldrich Lopez
- Bong Sangalang

Team manager

- Lance Tan

Legend

- (HG) Homegrown
- (FF) Filipino-foreigner
- (EA) EASL player
- (RS) Reserve player
- (S) Suspended
- Injured

- Roster – via Genius Sports
Updated as of: June 22, 2026

=== Head coaches ===
Bacolod Masskara head coaches
	Name	Start	End	Achievements	Ref.
1	Vic Ycasiano	2019–20	2019–20	—	
2	Alexander Angeles	2021	2022	—	
3	Monel Kallos	2023	2023	—	
4	Vincent Salvador	2023	2023	—	
5	Alex Cabagnot	2024	2024	—	
6	RJ Argamino	2024	2024	—	
7	Paolo Javelona	2025	2025	—	
8	Lency Aransazo	2026	current	—	

== Notable players ==
=== Individual award winners ===
MPBL Defensive Player of the Year

- Mark Yee – 2022

=== MPBL All-Star Day ===
All-Star selections

- Paolo Javelona – 2020
- Mark Yee – 2022
- Louie Vigil – 2024

=== PBA players ===
Ex-PBA players

- Harold Arboleda
- RR Garcia
- Mac Tallo
- Mark Yee
- Louie Vigil

Drafted to PBA

- Simon Camacho – 34th overall, 2019

== Season-by-season records ==
=== MPBL ===
Note: Statistics are correct as of the end of the 2026 MPBL season.

MPBL champions	Division champions	Playoff berth

Season	League	Division	Regular season						Playoffs	
Season	League	Division	Finish	Played	Wins	Losses	Win %	GB	Round	Results
Bacolod Master Sardines
2019–20	MPBL	South	11th	30	11	19	.367	15	Did not qualify	
Bacolod Bingo Plus
2022	MPBL	South	5th	21	14	7	.667	4	Division quarterfinals Division semifinals	won vs. General Santos, 2–1 lost vs. Zamboanga, 1–2
Bacolod City of Smiles
2023	MPBL	South	9th	28	11	17	.393	12	Did not qualify	
2024	MPBL	South	15th	28	1	27	.036	20	Did not qualify	
Bacolod Tubo Slashers
2025	MPBL	South	14th	29	4	25	.138	21	Did not qualify	
Bacolod Masskara
2026	MPBL	South	Banned						Did not qualify	
Regular season record				136	41	95	.301		1 playoff appearance	
Playoff record				6	3	3	.500		0 finals appearances	
Cumulative record				142	44	98	.310		0 championships	
