= Mindoro Tamaraws =

Professional basketball team in Mindoro island in the Philippines

- 2026 Mindoro Tamaraws season
- League: MPBL
- Founded: 2019; 7 years ago
- History: Mindoro Tamaraws; 2019–2021, 2024–present Mindoro Tams; 2022 (Oriental) Mindoro Disiplinados; 2023
- Arena: Pola Gymnasium
- Location: Mindoro
- Team colors
- Head coach: Edgar Macaraya

The Mindoro Tamaraws are a Filipino professional basketball team based in the province of Oriental Mindoro. The team primarily competes in the Maharlika Pilipinas Basketball League (MPBL) as a member of the league's South Division. The team splits its home games between the Sentrong Pangkabataan in Calapan and the Pola Gymnasium in Pola.

The team began play during the 2019–20 season. The franchise also competed in NBL–Pilipinas as the Mindoro Tamaraws Disiplinados (stylized as Disipl-Ina-dos) during the 2021 Chairman's Cup. The Tamaraws are the lone team based in the Mimaropa region.

== History ==
=== Maharlika Pilipinas Basketball League ===
The Mindoro Tamaraws joined the MPBL as an expansion team for the 2019–20 season, backed by 7A Sports and with Justin Tan as the team owner In the Tamaraws' inaugural season, the team finished 12th in the South with a 9-21 record. In April 2020, actress and Pola mayor Jennifer "Ina Alegre" Cruz became co-owner of the team.

In the 2021 MPBL Invitational, Mindoro was able to make the playoff tournament by placing second in Group D. The team would go on to lose to the eventual Invitational champion Basilan Jumbo Plastic in the quarterfinals. Despite the great performance, in the 2022 season, the Tams finished with the worst record in the league, only getting one win in 21 games.

Heading into the 2023 season, the team was renamed the Oriental Mindoro Disiplinados; it would be changed partially to Mindoro Disiplinados in June 2023. On July 4, 2023, the Disiplinados played its first-ever home game in the Sentrong Pangkabataan. Later in the month, the team joined the Junior MPBL with the Mindoro Junior Disiplinados, the team was previously the junior team of the Caloocan Batang Kankaloo.

=== National Basketball League ===
In 2021, a second team dubbed as the Mindoro Tamaraws Disiplinados was formed for the NBL–Pilipinas which is meant to a more homegrown-oriented team as opposed to the MPBL team which is intended to be the "showcase team".

=== Scheduled Pilipinas Super League participation ===
In October 2023, the Disiplinados were announced as one of the new teams for the Pilipinas Super League's 2023–24 President's Cup, where team would supposedly participate under the name RCP Pola Disiplinados–Shawarma Shack.

During the opening ceremonies, however, there was no mention of the Disiplinados. The team would move forward as the RCP–Shawarma Shack Demigods.

== Home venues ==
When mayor Cruz joined the team's ownership, it was also reported that a new arena was under construction in Calapan. The arena became known as the Sentrong Pangkabataan and opened its doors in 2023. In 2024, the Mindoro franchise moved to the Pola Gymnasium in Pola.

Venue	Location	2019–20	2022	2023	2024	2025
Sentrong Pangkabataan	Calapan, Oriental Mindoro	✗	✗	✓	✗	✗
Pola Gymnasium	Pola, Oriental Mindoro	✗	✗	✗	✓	✓

== Current roster ==
Mindoro Tamaraws roster
Players

Pos.	No.	Name	Height	Weight	DOB	From
G	0	Aaron Jeruta	5 ft 10 in (1.78 m)		1994–10–16	Centro Escolar
G	1	Jon Ivan Cudiamat (HG)	5 ft 11 in (1.80 m)		2001–10–27	Emilio Aguinaldo
G	4	Drick Acosta	5 ft 11 in (1.80 m)		2000–06–14	Saint Clare College
F	5	JC Recto (HG)	6 ft 4 in (1.93 m)			Mapúa
G/F	6	Riego Gamalinda	6 ft 3 in (1.91 m)	184 lb (83 kg)	1986–05–25	San Beda
F	7	Ericson Parreño (HG)	6 ft 3 in (1.91 m)
F	9	Joshua Ramirez	6 ft 3 in (1.91 m)		1994–05–27	UPHSD
G	11	Joshua Tagala	6 ft 0 in (1.83 m)			San Beda
F	12	JJ Caspe (HG)	5 ft 11 in (1.80 m)			Batangas
G	13	Brian Heruela	5 ft 10 in (1.78 m)	195 lb (88 kg)	1989–04–13	Cebu
F	15	Ronrei Tolentino	6 ft 3 in (1.91 m)		2000–03–27	San Beda
G	16	RJ Ramirez (FF)	6 ft 0 in (1.83 m)			Far Eastern
G	17	Joseph Sedurifa	6 ft 1 in (1.85 m)	175 lb (79 kg)	1990–09–04	Centro Escolar
G/F	18	Rodel Vaygan (HG)	5 ft 11 in (1.80 m)			PMI
G	21	Jayvee Dela Cruz	6 ft 0 in (1.83 m)		1997–04–28	CUPasay
F/C	22	Marion Magat	6 ft 7 in (2.01 m)	180 lb (82 kg)	1989–10–22	National-U
G	23	Clint Doliguez	6 ft 1 in (1.85 m)	188 lb (85 kg)	1994–05–27	San Beda
F/C	25	Ken Bono	6 ft 5 in (1.96 m)	280 lb (127 kg)	1984-06-19	Adamson
F	27	Jonas Tibayan	6 ft 3 in (1.91 m)			National-U
F	31	Josh Flores	6 ft 5 in (1.96 m)
G	32	Hanz Philip Maycong	6 ft 0 in (1.83 m)		2002-04-06	Olivarez
G	71	Jeco Bancale	5 ft 10 in (1.78 m)		2001-09-07	Mapúa
F	77	John Apacible (HG)	6 ft 4 in (1.93 m)		1996–02–07	UE

Coaches

Head coach

- Edgar Macaraya

Assistant coach(es)

- Bong Ramos
- Bengie Teodoro
- JC Libunao
- Melo Banua
- Gab Mallari

Team consultant

- Budds Reyes

Team manager

- Zhandra Norte

Legend

- (HG) Homegrown
- (FF) Filipino-foreigner
- (EA) EASL player
- (RS) Reserve player
- (S) Suspended
- Injured

- Roster – via Genius Sports
Updated as of: June 22, 2026

=== Head coaches ===
Mindoro Tamaraws head coaches
#	Name	Start	End	Achievements	Ref.
1	Bengie Teodoro	2019	2019	—	
2	Justin Tan	2019	2020	—	
3	Britt Reroma	2021	2021	—	
4	Drake Santos	2022	2022	—	
5	Jonathan Reyes	2022	2023	—	
6	JR Cawaling	2024	2024	—	
7	Rodney Santos	2025	2025	—	
8	Bengie Teodoro	2025	2026	—	
9	Edgar Macaraya	2026	current	—	

== Notable players ==
=== MPBL All-Star Day ===
All-Star selections

- Rodel Vaygan – 2020
- Khen Osicos – 2022
- JJ Caspe – 2024

=== PBA players ===
Ex-PBA players

- Mac Baracael
- Brian Heruela
- Paulo Hubalde
- Ronnie Matias
- Magi Sison
- Teytey Teodoro
- Ken Bono
- Marion Magat
- Riego Gamalinda

== Season-by-season records ==
League champions
Division champions
Qualified for playoffs
Best regular season record

Season	Regular season							Playoffs	
Season	Division	Finish	GP	W	L	PCT	GB	Stage	Results
Mindoro Tamaraws
2019–20; Lakan Season	South	12th	30	9	21	.300	17	Did not qualify	
Mindoro Tams
2022	South	11th	21	1	20	.048	17	Did not qualify	
Mindoro Disiplinados
2023	South	12th	28	6	22	.214	17	Did not qualify	
Mindoro Tamaraws
2024	South	10th	28	10	18	.357	11	Did not qualify	
2025	South	8th	29	15	14	.517	10	Division quarterfinals	lost vs. Quezon, 0–2
2026	South	7th	25	13	12	.520	8	Division quarterfinals	lost vs. Biñan, 0–2
All-time regular season record			161	54	107	.335		2 playoff appearances	
All-time playoff record			4	0	4	.000		0 Finals appearances	
All-time overall record			165	54	111	.327		0 championships	
