= Iloilo United Royals =

Professional basketball team in Iloilo, Philippines

- League: MPBL (2019–2020, 2023–2024, 2026)
- Founded: 2019; 7 years ago
- History: Iloilo United Royals; 2019–present
- Arena: Passi City Arena
- Location: Passi, Iloilo
- Team colors
- Main sponsor: Jerm Waste Transport
- Head coach: RJ Patricio

The Iloilo United Royals are a Philippine professional basketball team based in Passi, Iloilo. The team competes in the Maharlika Pilipinas Basketball League (MPBL) as a member of the league's South Division. The team most recently played its home games at Passi City Arena.

The team joined the league in the 2019–20 season.

== History ==
JJ Javelosa, who would later own the team, and basketball coach Nash Racela conceived of an idea for an Iloilo team in the Maharlika Pilipinas Basketball League (MPBL) while playing golf. Racela brought in his co-coach Eric Gonzales to the nascent team. Javelosa, would have tapped his son Jay, who was then playing college basketball for the Ateneo Blue Eagles, while Racela would have recruited from his varsity FEU Tamaraws team. MPBL founder Manny Pacquiao approved of the plan, but was almost shelved when a sponsor backed out. The elder Javelosa eventually found new sponsors, and named the team the Iloilo United Royals.

In the Royals' inaugural season, the team qualified to the playoffs in its debut season, finishing 18–12, claiming the sixth seed in the South. In the First Round, the team was eliminated by the Basilan Steel in the South Division First Round.

In the 2021 MPBL Invitational, the team was drawn into Group A alongside the other Visayas teams – Bacolod and Negros – and finished second, placing them into the playoff tournament. The team would go on to lose to the Nueva Ecija Rice Vanguards in the Quarterfinals. Iloilo then opted out of the 2022 MPBL season, with Javelosa stating that they took a leave of absence as they were uncertain that the MPBL will hold a tournament due to the COVID-19 pandemic in the Philippines.

The Royals were announced to be one of the teams returning to the MPBL in time for the 2023 season. Manu Inigo replaced Eric Gonzales as coach, with Cocolife as the principal sponsor.

The Royals didn't take part in the 2025 season but returned in the 2026 season. However their franchise was revoked by the MPBL management mid-season after abandoning a June 17, 2026 game and remained non-committal for future fixtures.

== Personnel ==
Iloilo United Royals roster
Players

Pos.	No.	Name	Height	Weight	DOB	From
G	1	Richard Movida (FF)	6 ft 1 in (1.85 m)			UPHSD
G	8	Leo Guion II (HG)	5 ft 8 in (1.73 m)			UE
F	10	Ryan Reyes	6 ft 3 in (1.91 m)		2000–03–26	Centro Escolar
F	13	Michael Jay Javelosa (HG)	6 ft 5 in (1.96 m)			Ateneo
F	15	Jorey Napoles	6 ft 4 in (1.93 m)		1993–11–27	TIP
F	18	Richard Velchez	6 ft 3 in (1.91 m)		1995–04–07	NEU
G	20	Joshua Devara (HG)	5 ft 9 in (1.75 m)			Emilio Aguinaldo
G	45	Alexis Himan	5 ft 9 in (1.75 m)			PWU
G	49	Carl Kenneth Sumalacay (HG)	5 ft 9 in (1.75 m)			Philippine Christian
F	87	Vic Manuel	6 ft 4 in (1.93 m)	231 lb (105 kg)	1987–06–18	PSBA
G	8	Jessiry Pedrosa (HG)	5 ft 8 in (1.73 m)
G	–	Shean Jackson	6 ft 2 in (1.88 m)	170 lb (77 kg)		Cheyenne HS (NV)
G	–	Daniel Atienza	5 ft 8 in (1.73 m)			Centro Escolar
F	–	John Patrick Gonzales				Centro Escolar

Coaches

Head coach

- RJ Patricio

Assistant coach(es)

- Bryant Bautista
- Thirdy Canaya
- Phelps Martinez
- Albert Olaya

Team manager

- Jay Javelosa

Legend

- (HG) Homegrown
- (FF) Filipino-foreigner
- (EA) EASL player
- (RS) Reserve player
- (S) Suspended
- Injured

- Roster – via Genius Sports
Updated as of: May 6, 2026

=== Head coaches ===
Iloilo United Royals head coaches
#	Name	Start	End	Achievements	Ref.
1	Eric Gonzales	2019	2021	—	
2	Manu Inigo	2023	2023	—	
3	MC Abolucion	2023	2024	—	
4	Sherwin Cantos	2026	2026	—	
5	RJ Patricio	2026	2026	—	

== Notable players ==
=== MPBL All-Star Day ===
All-Star selections

- Richard Escoto – 2020
- CJ Catapusan – 2023
- Josh Flores – 2023
- Renzo Navarro – 2023

=== PBA players ===
Ex-PBA players

- Samboy de Leon
- Frank Golla (returned to PBA)
- Chito Jaime
- Eric Rodriguez
- Kyt Jimenez
- Vic Manuel
- James Sena
- Reil Cervantes

Drafted to PBA

- Rey Publico – 16th overall, 2019
- Mark Nonoy – 10th overall, season 49
- CJ Cansino – 11th overall, season 49

== Season-by-season records ==
League champions
Division champions
Qualified for playoffs
Best regular season record

Season	Regular season							Playoffs	
Season	Division	Finish	GP	W	L	PCT	GB	Stage	Results
Iloilo United Royals
2019–20; Lakan Season	South	6th	30	18	12	.600	8	Division quarterfinals	lost vs. Basilan, 0–2
Did not participate in 2022
2023	South	8th	28	12	16	.429	11	Division quarterfinals	lost vs. Bacoor City, 1–2
2024	South	9th	28	11	17	.393	10	Did not qualify	
Did not participate in 2025
2026	South	Banned						Did not qualify	
All-time regular season record			86	41	45	.477		2 playoff appearances	
All-time playoff record			5	1	4	.200		0 Finals appearances	
All-time overall record			91	42	49	.462		0 championships	
