= Bicol Volcanoes =

Basketball team in the Philippines

- League: MPBL (2019–2024)
- Founded: 2019
- Folded: 2024
- History: Bicol Volcanoes; 2019–2023; Bicolandia Oragons; 2024
- Arena: Ibalong Centrum for Recreation; Albay Astrodome
- Location: Legazpi, Albay
- Team colors

The Bicol Volcanoes were a Philippine professional basketball team based in Legazpi, Albay. The team last completed in the Maharlika Pilipinas Basketball League (MPBL) from 2019 to 2020 and again from 2023 to 2024. The team played its home games at Ibalong Centrum for Recreation and Albay Astrodome.

The team was founded as one of six expansion teams for the league's 2019–20 season.

== History ==
Founded in 2019, the Bicol franchise joined the Maharlika Pilipinas Basketball League as an expansion team for its 2019–20 season. The franchise was originally going to named the Albay Volcanoes, but changed its location identifier to Bicol to represent the entire region.

Led by ex-PBA cager Ronjay Buenafe, the Volcanoes finished with a 16–14 record, clinching the eighth seed in the playoffs. Bicol faced the first-seeded Davao Occidental Tigers in the First Round. The team won game 2 to tie the series, marking the first time that an 8-seed won a playoff game against a 1-seed. Unfortunately, Bicol would lose the deciding game 3 in overtime. Bicol was one of the 22 teams that took part in the 2021 Invitational. After finishing second place in Group B, the team would lose to Imus in the Quarterfinals.

Logo of the Bicolandia Oragons used in 2024.

After opting out of the 2022 season, the team returned for the succeeding 2023 season. The team would go on to win only one game in the 28-game season, which came against Mindoro in the 17th game.

On March 2, 2024, the team formally announced a name change to the Bicolandia Oragons, with Shawarma Shack as their main sponsor.

== Home venues ==
The Bicol franchise has used two venues in the 2019–20 season: the Ibalong Centrum for Recreation and the Albay Astrodome, both located in Legazpi, Albay.

Venue	Location	2019–20	2022	2023	2024
Ibalong Centrum for Recreation	Legazpi, Albay	✓	DNP	✗	✗
Albay Astrodome	Legazpi, Albay	✓	DNP	✗	✗

== Personnel ==
=== Head coaches ===
Bicol Volcanoes/Bicolandia Oragons head coaches
#	Name	Start	End	Achievements	Ref.
1	Monel Kallos	2019–20	2019–20	—	
2	Aldin Ayo	2021	2021	—	
3	Vis Valencia	2023	2023	—	
4	Jason Santiago	2023	2023–2024	—	
5	Raymond Valenzona	2024	2024	—	

== Notable players ==
=== MPBL All-Star Day ===
All-Star selections

- Ronjay Buenafe – 2020

=== PBA players ===
Ex-PBA players

- Ronjay Buenafe
- Mark Cruz
- Brian Ilad
- Chris Javier
- James Martinez
- Alex Nuyles
- Raphy Reyes
- Mac Tallo (returned to PBA)
- Mark Yee
- Raphy Reyes
- Chris Javier

== Season-by-season records ==
League champions
Division champions
Qualified for playoffs
Best regular season record

Season	Regular season							Playoffs	
Season	Division	Finish	GP	W	L	PCT	GB	Stage	Results
Bicol Volcanoes
2019–20; Lakan Season	South	8th	30	16	14	.533	10	Division quarterfinals	lost vs. Davao Occidental, 1–2
Did not participate from 2022
2023	South	14th	28	1	27	.036	22	Did not qualify	
Bicolandia Oragons
2024	South	13th	28	3	25	.107	18	Did not qualify	
Did not participate from 2025 to 2026
All-time regular season record			86	20	66	.233		1 playoff appearance	
All-time playoff record			3	1	2	.333		0 Finals appearances	
All-time overall record			89	21	68	.236		0 championships	
