= NLEX Road Warriors all-time roster =

The following is a list of players, both past and current, who appeared at least in one game for the NLEX Road Warriors PBA franchise. Statistics are accurate as of the 2024 PBA Philippine Cup.

== Players ==
^	Denotes player who is currently on the Road Warriors roster								
^{+}	Denotes player who played as an import for the Road Warriors								
G	Guard	G/F	Guard-forward	F	Forward	F/C	Forward-center	C	Center

Player	Place of birth	Pos.	From	Yrs.	Seasons	Statistics					Ref.
Player	Place of birth	Pos.	From	Yrs.	Seasons	GP	MP	PTS	REB	AST	Ref.
Rodrigue Akl^{+}	Lebanon	G	Lebanon	1	2016	12	211	29	25	28	
Rabeh Al-Hussaini	Philippines	C	Ateneo	2	2017–2018	33	578	218	110	21	
Kevin Alas^	Philippines	G	Letran	8	2015–present	171	4,613	2,050	693	532	
Kwame Alexander^{+}	United States	F	Cal State San Bernardino	1	2015	11	425	223	154	22	
Baser Amer^	Philippines	G	San Beda	1	2024–present	12	230	63	19	22	
Sean Anthony^	Canada	F	McGill	4	2015–2017; 2023–present	78	2,047	893	573	170	
Jeckster Apinan	Philippines	F	José Rizal	2	2014–2016	26	177	43	39	5	
Harold Arboleda	Philippines	G/F	UPHSD	2	2014–2016	36	310	47	55	14	
Wynne Arboleda	Philippines	G	MLQU	1	2014–2015	20	157	31	15	9	
Olu Ashaolu^{+}	Nigeria	F	Louisiana Tech	2	2018–2019	12	445	299	163	39	
Mike Ayonayon	Philippines	G	Philippine Christian	2	2020–2021	16	245	61	31	29	
Cyrus Baguio	Philippines	G/F	UST	3	2017–2019	68	1,065	280	153	126	
Juneric Baloria	Philippines	G	UPHSD	1	2014–2015	17	109	59	14	2	
Mac Baracael	Philippines	F	Far Eastern	2	2016–2017	37	475	141	58	30	
Robert Bolick^	Philippines	G	San Beda	1	2023–present	16	619	404	84	120	
Mark Borboran	Philippines	F	UE	2	2014–2016	57	1,058	253	162	32	
Ronjay Buenafe	Philippines	G	Emilio Aguinaldo	1	2018	7	76	23	10	5	
Eric Camson	Philippines	F	Adamson	3	2014–2017	46	413	170	115	21	
KG Canaleta	Philippines	F	UE	1	2014–2015	36	721	291	120	20	
Mark Cardona	Philippines	G	De La Salle	2	2014–2016	50	1,066	451	191	61	
Reden Celda	Philippines	G	National-U	1	2022–2023	7	73	12	6	9	
Stokley Chaffee Jr.^{+}	United States	F	Memphis	1	2024	5	204	114	65	11	
Edgar Charcos^	Philippines	G	UPHSD	1	2024–present	1	5	3	1	1	
Wayne Chism^{+}	United States	F/C	Tennessee	1	2017	11	412	259	159	28	
Justin Chua	Philippines	F/C	Ateneo	2	2022, 2022	33	638	317	162	31	
Cameron Clark^{+}	United States	F	Oklahoma	1	2022	6	236	149	71	10	
Earl Clark^{+}	United States	F	Louisville	1	2022	13	542	420	207	52	
Jericho Cruz	Philippines	G	Adamson	3	2019–2022	52	1,328	558	184	183	
Clint Doliguez	Philippines	G	San Beda	2	2023, 2023	6	46	17	9	3	
Simon Enciso	United States	G	Notre Dame de Namur	1	2015–2016	24	550	150	43	53	
Poy Erram	Philippines	C	Ateneo	1	2019	33	850	386	269	59	
Dominick Fajardo^	Philippines	F	Bulacan State	1	2023–present	14	218	82	37	15	
Larry Fonacier	Philippines	G/F	Ateneo	4	2017–2019; 2022	84	1,814	606	251	171	
Adrian Forbes^{+}	Jamaica	C	Auburn	1	2018	1	41	26	17	1	
James Forrester	Canada	G/F	Arellano	1	2016	3	18	3	0	0	
Aaron Fuller^{+}	United States	F	USC	2	2017–2018	21	841	562	364	62	
Hesed Gabo	Philippines	G	Mapúa	2	2023, 2023	10	103	12	2	11	
Bong Galanza	Philippines	G/F	UE	4	2018–2022	55	1,009	381	97	66	
Brandon Ganuelas-Rosser	United States	F/C	UC Riverside	2	2022–2023	28	810	348	167	30	
Alfonzo Gotladera	Philippines	C/F	Ateneo	2	2016–2018	28	205	52	47	11	
Bradwyn Guinto	Philippines	C/F	San Sebastian	1	2016–2017	19	368	127	92	15	
Manny Harris^{+}	United States	G	Michigan	1	2019	8	320	247	72	52	
Borgie Hermida	Philippines	G	San Beda	1	2014–2015	7	51	12	7	3	
Robbie Herndon^	United States	G/F	San Francisco State	1	2023–present	22	468	190	87	37	
Kenneth Ighalo	Philippines	F	Mapúa	6	2017–2023	124	1,882	602	334	92	
Glenn Khobuntin	Philippines	F	National-U	2	2015–2017	53	773	212	93	34	
Garvo Lanete	Philippines	G	San Beda	2	2015–2017	49	896	344	77	45	
Kyles Lao	Philippines	G	Philippines	1	2019	22	204	61	29	27	
Carlo Lastimosa	Philippines	G	St. Benilde	1	2016–2017	33	543	280	45	56	
Rudy Lingganay	Philippines	G	UE	1	2014–2015	25	409	114	43	34	
Michael Madanly^{+}	Syria	G/F	Syria	1	2015	10	304	197	30	24	
Marion Magat	Philippines	F/C	National-U	3	2019; 2021–2022	32	397	119	120	17	
Alex Mallari	United States	G/F	Lewis–Clark State	2	2017–2018	47	1,098	434	219	136	
Dave Marcelo^	Philippines	F/C	San Beda	2	2018; 2023–present	30	361	76	85	28	
Will McAloney	Philippines	F/C	San Carlos	2	2020–2021	14	157	57	47	3	
K. J. McDaniels^{+}	United States	G/F	Clemson	1	2021–2022	11	437	334	126	36	
Michael Miranda^	Philippines	F/C	San Sebastian	6	2017–2018; 2019–present	130	2,191	625	413	109	
Tony Mitchell^{+}	United States	F	North Texas	1	2019	6	216	164	76	16	
Emman Monfort	Philippines	G	Ateneo	4	2016–2019	58	718	169	105	94	
Arnett Moultrie^{+}	United States	F	Mississippi State	1	2018	9	342	269	132	30	
David Murrell	United States	F	Philippines	1	2022	4	34	13	10	0	
Jorey Napoles^	Philippines	F	TIP	1	2024–present	1	4	1	0	0	
Jhan Nermal^	Philippines	F	STI WNU	1	2023–present	15	253	143	41	3	
Matt Nieto^	Philippines	G	Ateneo	3	2022–present	54	1,317	335	123	179	
Calvin Oftana	Philippines	F	San Beda	2	2021–2022	33	881	435	222	71	
Philip Paniamogan	Philippines	G	José Rizal	5	2018–2023	96	1,412	543	187	154	
Philip Paredes	Philippines	F/C	De La Salle	1	2019	11	93	11	19	2	
Jake Pascual^	Philippines	F	San Beda	2	2023–present	24	247	39	55	10	
Kris Porter	Philippines	F/C	Ateneo	3	2019–2022	30	531	147	86	25	
J. R. Quiñahan	Philippines	F/C	Visayas	6	2017–2023	138	3,609	1,561	652	321	
Aldrech Ramos	Philippines	F	Far Eastern	1	2014–2015	36	711	221	116	14	
Kiefer Ravena	Philippines	G	Ateneo	4	2017–2021	51	1,541	846	221	301	
Pamboy Raymundo	Philippines	G	San Sebastian	1	2014–2015	24	184	43	25	21	
Rob Reyes	United States	F/C	Flagler	1	2015–2016	27	228	49	54	3	
Jansen Rios	Philippines	G/F	Adamson	4	2015–2019	65	738	245	120	72	
Thomas Robinson^{+}	United States	C/F	Kansas	1	2023	4	149	138	53	14	
Richie Rodger^	New Zealand	G	UE	1	2023–present	21	442	109	47	32	
Kris Rosales	United States	G	Hope International	3	2021–2023	57	1,275	459	127	140	
Kent Salado	Philippines	G	Arellano	1	2024	1	2	0	0	0	
Wayne Selden Jr.^{+}	United States	F	Kansas	1	2023	7	312	223	46	47	
Anthony Semerad^	Australia	F	San Beda	4	2020–present	80	1,923	572	274	49	
Jonathon Simmons^{+}	United States	G/F	Houston	1	2023	4	170	148	36	20	
Raul Soyud	Philippines	C	Philippines	8	2015–2022	144	1,842	729	589	66	
Yousef Taha^	Kuwait	C	Mapúa	1	2024–present	2	14	2	7	0	
Mac Tallo	Philippines	G	Southwestern-U	2	2018–2019	30	495	160	53	88	
Asi Taulava	Tonga	C	BYU–Hawaii	9	2014–2023	158	3,025	1,227	948	194	
Al Thornton^{+}	United States	F	Florida State	2	2015–2016	25	1,054	833	303	51	
Juami Tiongson	Philippines	G	Ateneo	3	2017–2019	83	1,341	515	145	197	
Don Trollano	Philippines	G/F	Adamson	3	2021–2023	73	2,241	1,021	378	160	
Ato Ular^	Philippines	F	Letran	1	2024–present	4	57	21	14	1	
Jonathan Uyloan	Philippines	G	Golden West	1	2018	10	139	23	22	23	
Enoch Valdez^	Philippines	G	Lyceum	1	2023–present	18	394	161	78	7	
Paul Varilla	United States	G/F	UE	4	2019–2022	59	802	124	89	42	
Enrico Villanueva	Philippines	F/C	Ateneo	4	2014–2017	74	1,208	339	201	58	
Jonas Villanueva	Philippines	G	Far Eastern	4	2014–2017	100	2,583	782	285	311	
Henry Walker^{+}	United States	G/F	Kansas State	1	2016	12	508	385	134	33	
Curtis Washington^{+}	United States	F/C	Georgia Tech	1	2019	1	32	18	16	1	
DeAndre Williams-Baldwin^{+}	United States	F	Memphis	1	2024	2	88	49	29	12	
John Wilson	Philippines	G	José Rizal	2	2015–2016	9	137	41	18	18	
