= List of 2015–16 PBA season transactions =

== List of transactions ==
=== Retirement ===
Date	Name	Team(s) played (years)	Age	Notes	Ref.
August 23	Danny Ildefonso	San Miguel Beermen (1998–2013); Meralco Bolts (2013–2015)	38	Ildefonso retired after a meeting with Meralco head coach Norman Black who told him that Meralco will revamp at the center position.	
August 25	Tyrone Tang	Rain or Shine Elasto Painters (2008–2015)	30	TY Tang retired as he is focusing on their family business.	
October 13	Mark Andaya	Talk 'N Text Phone Pals (2006–2007); Air21 Express (2007); Red Bull Barako (2007–2008); Rain or Shine Elasto Painters (2008–2009); Barako Bull Energy Boosters (2010–2011); Barako Bull Energy (2012); Air21 Express (2012)	34	Andaya ran for councilor of Manila in the 2016 elections.	
October 14	Paul Artadi	Purefoods Tender Juicy Giants (2004–2007, 2009–2010); Barangay Ginebra Kings (2007–2009); San Miguel Beermen (2011–2012); Air21 Express/Barako Bull Energy (2011–2012); Meralco Bolts (2012–2014); Blackwater Elite (2014–2015)	34	Artadi ran for councilor of San Juan, Metro Manila in the 2016 elections.	
November 25	Don Allado	Alaska Milkmen/Alaska Aces (1999–2006); Talk 'N Text Phone Pals/Talk 'N Text Tropang Texters (2006–2008); Air21 Express (2008–2009); Purefoods Tender Juicy Giants/B-Meg Derby Ace Llamados (2009–2011); Barako Bull Energy/Barako Bull Energy Cola (2011–2013); Meralco Bolts (2013–2014); Star Hotshots (2014–2015)	38	Allado retired after 16 years playing in the PBA.	

=== Front office movements ===
==== Head coach changes ====
Hire date	Team	Outgoing head coach	Reason for departure	Incoming head coach	Last coaching position	Ref.
July 20, 2015	Ginebra	Frankie Lim	Fired	Tim Cone	Star Hotshots head coach (2011–2015)	
July 20, 2015	Star	Tim Cone	Assigned to Ginebra	Jason Webb	Star Hotshots assistant coach (2015)	
April 8, 2016	GlobalPort	Eric Gonzales	Demoted to assistant coach	Johnedel Cardel	GlobalPort Batang Pier assistant coach	
April 29, 2016	Mahindra	Chito Victolero (Interim)	Resigned	Chris Gavina (Interim)		
May 31, 2016	Phoenix	Koy Banal	End of contract	Ariel Vanguardia	Westports Malaysia Dragons head coach	
October 5, 2016	NLEX	Boyet Fernandez	Fired	Yeng Guiao	Rain or Shine Elasto Painters head coach (2011–2016)	
October 5, 2016	Rain or Shine	Yeng Guiao	Signed by NLEX	Caloy Garcia	Rain or Shine Elasto Painters assistant coach	
October 14, 2016	Star	Jason Webb	Demoted to consultant role	Chito Victolero	Mahindra Enforcer assistant coach (2014–2016)	

==== Team Manager ====
Hire date	Team	Outgoing Team Manager	Reason for departure	Incoming Team Manager	Ref.
August 7	Talk 'N Text	Jimmy Alapag	Traded to Meralco	Magnum Membrere	

=== Player movement ===
==== Trades ====
August
August 7	Three-team trade
August 7	To Talk 'N Text: Larry Rodriguez (from Blackwater)	To Meralco: Jimmy Alapag (from Talk 'N Text)
August 7	To Blackwater: Mike Cortez(from Meralco); James Sena (from Meralco)
August 18
August 18	To GlobalPort: Jervy Cruz	To Rain or Shine: Jewel Ponferada; 2015 2nd Round Draft Pick (from GlobalPort)
August 20
August 20	To GlobalPort: Jay Washington	To Talk 'N Text: Dennis Miranda
August 25	Three-team trade
August 25	To Talk 'N Text: Troy Rosario (from Mahindra)	To NLEX: Kevin Alas (from Talk 'N Text)
August 25	To Mahindra: Niño Canaleta (from NLEX); Aldrech Ramos (from NLEX); Rob Reyes (from Talk 'N Text)
August 25	To Ginebra: Nico Salva; 2016 First Round Draft Pick	To Barako Bull: Josh Urbiztondo; Emman Monfort; Jens Knuttel
August 25	To San Miguel: Brian Heruela	To Barako Bull: Jeric Fortuna
August 27
August 27	To NLEX: Simon Enciso	To Rain or Shine: 2018 2nd Round Draft Pick (from NLEX)
September
September 19
September 19	To Barako Bull: Mick Pennisi	To Star: 2017 2nd Round Draft Pick
September 24	Three-team trade
September 24	To Barako Bull: Ronald Pascual (from San Miguel)	To San Miguel: Ryan Araña (from Rain or Shine)
September 24	To Rain or Shine: 2016 Second Round Pick (from Barako Bull via Star Hotshots)
September 28	Four-team trade
September 28	To Barako Bull: Prince Caperal (from Ginebra via Globalport); Mac Baracael (from Ginebra)	To Ginebra: Joe Devance (from Barako Bull via Star Hotshots)
September 28	To Star: Jake Pascual (from Barako Bull); Ronald Pascual (from Barako Bull)	To GlobalPort: Dorian Peña (from Ginebra)
October
October 7	Three-team trade
October 7	To Meralco: 2016 and 2017 Second Round Picks (from Mahindra)	To Mahindra: Juneric Baloria; 2016 and 2017 Second Round Picks (from NLEX)
October 7	To NLEX: Sean Anthony (from Mahindra via Meralco)
October 8
October 8	To Talk 'N Text: Dylan Ababou	To Barako Bull: 2016 Second Round Pick
October 13
October 13	To Barako Bull: Jervy Cruz	To GlobalPort: Rico Maierhofer
November
November 16
November 16	To Ginebra: Jervy Cruz	To Barako Bull: Rodney Brondial; 2018 2nd Round Draft Pick
March
March 1
March 1	To GlobalPort: Jeric Fortuna	To Phoenix: 2018 2nd Round Draft Pick
May
May 5
May 5	To NLEX: Mac Baracael; Emman Monfort; 2018 2nd Round Draft Pick	To Phoenix: Simon Enciso; Mark Borboran
May 6	Three-team trade
May 6	To Blackwater: Roi Sumang (from GlobalPort via Mahindra)	To Mahindra: Paolo Taha (from GlobalPort); Keith Agovida (from Blackwater)
May 6	To GlobalPort: Karl Dehesa (from Mahindra); 2018 2nd Round Draft pick (from Mahindra)
May 11	Three-team trade
May 11	To Star: Keith Jensen (from GlobalPort); Rodney Brondial; RR Garcia (from Phoenix)	To GlobalPort: Yousef Taha (from Star); Ronald Pascual (from Star)
May 11	To Phoenix: Jonathan Uyloan (from GlobalPort via Star); Mark Cruz (from Star); Norbert Torres (from Star)
May 31
May 31	To NLEX: James Forrester	To Phoenix: John Wilson
July
July 12
July 12	To Meralco: Jonathan Uyloan	To Phoenix: Ronjay Buenafe
July 13
July 13	To Alaska: Cyrus Baguio 2017 Second Round Pick	To Phoenix: 2017 and 2018 Second Round Picks
September (2016)
September 1
September 1	To Blackwater: Ronald Pascual	To GlobalPort: Mike Cortez
October (2016)
October 13, 2016	To GlobalPort: JR Quiñahan	To Rain or Shine: Jay Washington
October 13, 2016	To Rain or Shine: James Yap	To Star: Paul Lee
October 14
October 14	To Mahindra: Josan Nimes	To Rain or Shine: 2018 2nd round draft pick

==== Free Agency Signings ====
Player	Pos	Signed	Contract Amount	Contract Length	New Team	Former Team	Ref
(Philippines) Alex Cabagnot	G	August 20	15.1 M	3 yrs	San Miguel	San Miguel	
(Philippines) Arwind Santos	F	August 20	15.1 M	3 yrs	San Miguel	San Miguel	
(Philippines) Ian Sangalang	F/C		15 M	3 yrs	Star	Star	
(Philippines) Dondon Hontiveros	G/F		5.04 M	1 yr	Alaska	Alaska	
(Philippines) Vic Manuel	F/C			2 yrs	Alaska	Alaska	
(United States) Willy Wilson	G/F			1 yr	Barako Bull	Barako Bull	
(Philippines) Dave Marcelo	F/C		2.4 M	1 yr	Ginebra	Ginebra	
(Philippines) LA Revilla^{[a]}	PG		1.2 M	1 yr	Mahindra	Mahindra	
(Philippines) Mark Yee^{[a]}	F		1.2 M	1 yr	Mahindra	Mahindra	
(Philippines) Jason Ballesteros	C		1.44 M	1 yr	Blackwater	Blackwater	
(Philippines) Bambam Gamalinda	F		1.2 M	1 yr	Blackwater	Blackwater	
(Philippines) Ronnie Matias	F	August 26	Not Disclosed	Not Disclosed	Rain or Shine	Barako Bull	
(Philippines) Chris Tiu^{[b]}	G	August 27		3 yrs	Rain or Shine	Rain or Shine	
(Philippines) Paolo Hubalde	G				Mahindra	Barako Bull	
(Philippines) Jonathan Uyloan	G	September 4			Globalport	Rain or Shine	
(Philippines) Gary David	SG	April 7	2 M	6 mos.	San Miguel	Meralco	
(Philippines) Denok Miranda	PG	August 15			Blackwater	TNT	
(Philippines) Sunday Salvacion	SF	August 18			GlobalPort	Pilipinas MX3	
(Philippines) Asi Taulava	C	August 22		2 yrs	NLEX	NLEX	
(Philippines) Paolo Taha	G	August 26		2 yrs	Mahindra	Mahindra	

- ^{a} Signing packages that included a car and a condominium unit.
- ^{b} Option to retire after his first year of contract.

==== Rookie signings ====
Player	Pos	Signed	Contract Amount	Contract Years	New Team	Former Team	Ref
(Tonga) Moala Tautuaa	F/C	August 28	8.5 M	3 Yrs	Talk 'N Text	Cebuana (PBA D-League)	
(Philippines) Troy Rosario	F/C	August 28	8.5 M	3 Yrs	Talk 'N Text	Hapee (PBA D-League)	
(Nigeria) Maverick Ahanmisi	G	August 28	4.5 M	2 Yrs	Rain or Shine	Cafe France (PBA D-League)	
(Philippines) Norbert Torres	F/C	September 5	4.2 M	2 Yrs	Star Hotshots	Cebuana (PBA D-League)	
(Philippines) Garvo Lanete	SG	September 5	8.55 M	3 Yrs	NLEX		
(Philippines) Glenn Khobuntin	F	September 5	4.5 M	2 Yrs	NLEX	Jumbo Plastic (PBA D-League)	
(Philippines) Jansen Rios	G	September 5	Not Disclosed	1 Yr	NLEX		
(United States) Simon Enciso	G	September 5	Not Disclosed	2 Yrs	NLEX	Cebuana (PBA D-League)	
(Philippines) Michael Mabulac	F	October 1	Not Disclosed	Not Disclosed	San Miguel Beermen		
(United States) Kris Rosales	G	April 29			TNT Katropa		
(Philippines) Gab Banal	F				GlobalPort Batang Pier		
(Philippines) Bong Galanza	G	August 30			Mahindra Enforcer	Euro-Med (PCBL)	

=== Released ===
==== Waived ====
Player	Date Waived	Former Team	Ref
(Philippines) Jonathan Uyloan	September 4	Rain or Shine	
(Philippines) Gary David	March 17	Meralco Bolts	
(Philippines) Denok Miranda		Tropang TNT	
(Philippines) Dorian Peña	July 15	GlobalPort Batang Pier	
(Philippines) Jeckster Apinan	July 26	NLEX Road Warriors	
(Philippines) Hyram Bagatsing	August 11	Mahindra Enforcer	
