= Byron Villarias =

Filipino basketball player

No. 51 – Basilan Steel
- Position: Shooting guard / Small forward
- League: MPBL

Personal information
- Born: February 25, 1988 (age 38) Silay, Negros Occidental, Philippines
- Listed height: 6 ft 0 in (1.83 m)

Career information
- College: JRU
- PBA draft: 2013: 5th round, 41st overall pick
- Drafted by: Talk 'N Text Tropang Texters
- Playing career: 2014–present

Career history
- 2014–2015: NLEX Road Warriors
- 2018–2020: Bataan Risers
- 2021–2025: Nueva Ecija Rice Vanguards / Capitals
- 2026–present: Basilan Steel

Career highlights
- MPBL champion (2022); MPBL Finals MVP (2022); FilBasket champion (Summer 2022)

John Byron "Toto" Villarias (born February 25, 1988) is a Filipino professional basketball player for the Basilan Steel of the Maharlika Pilipinas Basketball League (MPBL).

After playing college ball with José Rizal University, he was selected with the 41st pick of the 2013 PBA draft by the Talk 'N Text Tropang Texters, but didn't get much playing time throughout his stint in the Philippine Basketball Association (PBA).

After playing for multiple teams in the PBA D-League, he joined the Bataan Risers of the MPBL in 2018. In 2021, he moved to the Nueva Ecija Rice Vanguards franchise, where he won two championships, one in FilBasket and one in the MPBL, and earned Finals MVP in the latter.

== Career statistics ==
Legend
GP	Games played	MPG	Minutes per game
FG%	Field-goal percentage	3P%	3-point field-goal percentage	FT%	Free-throw percentage
RPG	Rebounds per game	APG	Assists per game	SPG	Steals per game
BPG	Blocks per game	PPG	Points per game	**Bold**	Career high

=== PBA ===
Year	Team	GP	MPG	FG%	3P%	FT%	RPG	APG	SPG	BPG	PPG
2014–15	NLEX	1	4.4	.000	.000	.500	.0	.0	.0	.0	1.0
Career		1	4.4	.000	.000	.500	.0	.0	.0	.0	1.0

=== MPBL ===
Year	Team	GP	GS	MPG	FG%	3P%	FT%	RPG	APG	SPG	BPG	PPG
2018–19	Bataan	30	13	22.1	.436	.345	.609	**6.2**	2.5	1.2	**0.8**	11.1
2019–20	Bataan	**32**	20	**25.1**	.393	.359	**.758**	4.8	**2.9**	1.2	0.4	**13.9**
2022	Nueva Ecija	**32**	**28**	20.3	**.444**	**.385**	.720	2.7	1.7	**1.8**	0.5	13.4
2023	Nueva Ecija	29	24	21.5	.354	.281	.519	3.6	2.2	**1.8**	0.7	9.6
