= 2022 MPBL playoffs =

Playoffs for the Maharlika Pilipinas Basketball League's 2022 season

2022 OKBet-MPBL Playoffs presented by Xtreme Appliances

Tournament details
- Country: Philippines
- Dates: October 15 – December 12, 2022
- Teams: 16
- Defending champions: Davao Occidental Tigers (Did not participate in the season)

Final positions
- Champions: Nueva Ecija Rice Vanguards
- Runners-up: Zamboanga Family's Brand Sardines
- Semifinalists: San Juan Knights; Batangas City Embassy Chill

Tournament statistics
- Matches played: 36

The 2022 MPBL playoffs was the postseason tournament of the Maharlika Pilipinas Basketball League's 2022 season, the league's fourth overall, and the third under the 16-team format. The postseason tournament began on October 15, 2022, two days after the end of the regular season on October 13, 2022, and concluded on December 12, 2022, following the conclusion of the 2022 MPBL finals.

The finals saw North Division champions Nueva Ecija Rice Vanguards face against South Division champions Zamboanga Family's Brand Sardines. Nueva Ecija beat Zamboanga in four games to win the championship series. Byron Villarias was crowned MPBL Finals MVP.

For sponsorship reasons, this playoff series was also known as the 2022 OKBet-MPBL Playoffs presented by Xtreme Appliances.

== Overview ==
- The Nueva Ecija Rice Vanguards entered the playoffs for the first time in franchise history and also clinched the best record in the league for the first time.
- The Zamboanga Family's Brand Sardines entered the playoffs for the third consecutive season and clinched the best record in the South Division for the first time.
- The Bataan Risers and Batangas City Embassy Chill entered the playoffs for the fourth consecutive season, tied for the longest playoff streak in the MPBL at the time.
- The Bacoor City Strikers, GenSan Warriors, and San Juan Knights entered the playoffs for the third consecutive season.
- The Pampanga Giant Lanterns and Pasig City MCW Sports entered the playoffs for the second consecutive season.
- The Bacolod Bingo Plus, Marikina Shoemasters, Rizal Golden Coolers, and Sarangani Marlins entered the playoffs for the first time in franchise history.
- The Muntinlupa Cagers and Quezon City MG entered the playoffs for the first time since 2019.
- The Valenzuela XUR Homes Realty Inc. entered the playoffs for the first time since 2018.
- The Makati × MNL Kingpin and Manila Stars missed the playoffs for the first time in their franchises' history, both having made the postseason since 2019.
- Due to their departures from the league:
  - Bicol, Bulacan, Davao Occidental, and Iloilo also missed the playoffs for the first time their franchises' history. Bicol and Iloilo made the postseason last season, while Bulacan and Davao Occidental made the playoffs since 2018 and 2019, respectively.
  - Basilan and Pasay also missed the playoffs after making the postseason last season.
- The Laguna Heroes missed the playoffs for the third consecutive season, which was the longest playoff drought in the MPBL at the time.
  - Including non-playing seasons, Parañaque also missed the playoffs for the third consecutive season, tying Laguna's playoff drought.

== Format ==
The top eight teams from each division advanced to the playoffs. Seeding was changed in this season, in that teams are seeded by wins and not winning percentage. Tiebreaker rules were applied with teams that have the same record. The single-elimination bracket consisted of four rounds with no reseeding. The first three rounds were best-of-three series and the national finals was a best-of-five series.

During the first two rounds, two games within the same division were played in a gameday, with homecourt advantage alternating between the higher-seeded teams of each series. A traditional homecourt format was then used for the last two rounds, with the division finals using a 1-1-1 format and the national finals using a 2-2-1 format. The designated home team may not be able to play within its home locality. Should it occur, the gameday may take place elsewhere.

== Division standings ==
North Division

Pos	Team	Pld	W	L	GB	Qualification
1	Nueva Ecija Rice Vanguards	21	21	0	—	Playoffs
2	Pasig City MCW Sports	21	14 (Note: Pasig (1.193), San Juan (0.993), and Pampanga (0.850) are ranked based on head-to-head point quotient.)	7	7	Playoffs
3	San Juan Knights	21	14	7	7	Playoffs
4	Pampanga Giant Lanterns	21	14	7	7	Playoffs
5	Bataan Risers	21	13	8	8	Playoffs
6	Valenzuela XUR Homes Realty Inc.	21	10	11	11	Playoffs
7	Quezon City MG	21	9	12	12	Playoffs
8	Marikina Shoemasters	21	8	13	13	Playoffs

Source: Standings
Notes:

South Division

Pos	Team	Pld	W	L	GB	Qualification
1	Zamboanga Family's Brand Sardines	21	18	3	—	Playoffs
2	Batangas City Embassy Chill	21	17	4	1	Playoffs
3	Sarangani Marlins	21	16	5	2	Playoffs
4	GenSan Warriors	21	15	6	3	Playoffs
5	Bacolod Bingo Plus	21	14	7	4	Playoffs
6	Rizal Golden Coolers	21	10	11	8	Playoffs
7	Bacoor City Strikers	21	9	12	9	Playoffs
8	Muntinlupa Cagers	21	6	15	12	Playoffs

Source: Standings

== Bracket ==
Teams in bold advanced to the next round. The numbers to the left of each team indicate the team's seeding in its division, and the numbers to the right indicate the number of games the team won in that round. Teams with home-court advantage, the higher-seeded team, are shown in italics.

Division quarterfinals (best-of-3)	Division semifinals (best-of-3)
N1	**Nueva Ecija**	**2**
N8	Marikina	0
N1	**Nueva Ecija**	**2**
N4	Pampanga	0
N4	**Pampanga**	**2**
N5	Bataan	1
**North Division**
N2	**Pasig**	**2**
N7	Quezon City	0
N2	Pasig	0
N3	**San Juan**	**2**
N3	**San Juan**	**2**
N6	Valenzuela	0
S1	**Zamboanga**	**2**
S8	Muntinlupa	0
S1	**Zamboanga**	**2**
S5	Bacolod	1
S4	General Santos	1
S5	**Bacolod**	**2**
**South Division**
S2	**Batangas City**	**2**
S7	Bacoor City	1
S2	**Batangas City**	**2**
S6	Rizal	0
S3	Sarangani	0
S6	**Rizal**	**2**

Division finals (best-of-3)
N1	**Nueva Ecija**	**2**
N3	San Juan	1
S1	**Zamboanga**	**2**
S2	Batangas City	1

National finals (best-of-5)
N1	**Nueva Ecija**	**3**
S1	Zamboanga	1

== First round ==
=== Northern Division ===
==== (1) Nueva Ecija Rice Vanguards vs. (8) Marikina Shoemasters ====
One PH
One Sports+

October 15
09:00 pm

Boxscore

Nueva Ecija Rice Vanguards	103–71	Marikina Shoemasters
Scoring by quarter: 27–17, 16–11, 30–20, 30–23
Pts: Renz Palma 16; Rebs: Michael Mabulac, William McAloney 7 Asts: Hesed Gabo 8		Pts: three players 13; Rebs: Normer Gonzales 11; Asts: Jexter Tolentino 4

Nueva Ecija Coliseum, Palayan, Nueva Ecija
Referees: E. Alejo, A. Dasal, B. Estroga,

One PH
One Sports+

October 22
05:30 pm

Boxscore

Nueva Ecija Rice Vanguards	82–71	Marikina Shoemasters
Scoring by quarter: 23–21, 14–19, 32–9, 13–22
Pts: William McAloney 19; Rebs: Jay Collado 12; Asts: Hesed Gabo 6		Pts: Jason Opiso 18; Rebs: Mark Atabay 12; Asts: Mark Atabay 5
Nueva Ecija wins series, 2–0

Bren Guiao Convention Center, San Fernando, Pampanga
Referees: J. Ocfemia, R. Agbalo, J. Macailo,

This is the first playoff meeting between the Rice Vanguards and the Shoemasters.

Head-to-head matchup

One PH
IWantTFC

August 15
5:00 pm

Boxscore

Nueva Ecija Rice Vanguards	99–77	Marikina Shoemasters
Scoring by quarter: 17–23, 28–22, 25–7, 29–25
Pts: John Villarias 25; Rebs: Michael Juico 9 Asts: John Raymundo 10		Pts: Nhomer Gonzales 23; Rebs: Nhomer Gonzales 9 Asts: Antonio Joson 8

Bren Guiao Convention Center,
San Fernando, Pampanga
Referees: Jonald Belnas, Hyram Scott, Reynaldo Gabriel

==== (2) Pasig City MCW Sports vs. (8) Quezon City MG ====
One PH
One Sports+

October 18
09:00 pm

Boxscore

Pasig City MCW Sports	84–80 (OT)	Quezon City MG
Scoring by quarter: 21–19, 18–22, 24–16, 15–21, Overtime: 6–2
Pts: Carlo Lastimosa 19; Rebs: Jason Melano 15; Asts: Ryan Costelo 6		Pts: Levi dela Cruz 18; Rebs: Levi dela Cruz 10; Asts: Marcy Arellano 9

Ynares Sports Arena, Pasig
Referees: R. Brila, B. Estroga, J. Dela Cruz,

One PH
One Sports+

October 25
06:30 pm

Boxscore

Pasig City MCW Sports	101–83	Quezon City MG
Scoring by quarter: 22–13, 25–21, 18–28, 36–21
Pts: Carlo Lastimosa 24; Rebs: Jason Ballesteros 13; Asts: Jason Melano, Robbie Manalang 5		Pts: Kentoy Segura 20; Rebs: Jerick Nacpil 10; Asts: Marcy Arellano 14
Pasig wins series, 2–0

Filoil EcoOil Centre, San Juan
Referees: J. Ocfemia, D. Dela Cruz, B. Estroga,

This is the first playoff meeting between Pasig City and Quezon City MG.

Head-to-head matchup

One PH
IWantTFC

August 13
7:00 pm

Boxscore

Pasig City	73–76	Quezon City MG
Scoring by quarter: 22–22, 16–10, 23–23, 12–21
Pts: Robbie Manalang 21; Rebs: Jason Melano 12; Asts: Jason Melano 5		Pts: Kent Lao 15; Rebs: Jerick Nacpil 6 Asts: Marcy Arellano 10

STRIKE Gymnasium, Bacoor, Cavite

==== (3) San Juan Knights vs. (8) Valenzuela XUR Homes Realty Inc. ====
One PH
One Sports+

October 18
06:30 pm

Boxscore

San Juan Knights	90–82	Valenzuela XUR Homes Realty Inc.
Scoring by quarter: 20–14, 25–18, 22–22, 23–28
Pts: Judel Fuentes 36; Rebs: Orlan Wamar 8 Asts: Dexter Maiquez, Orlan Wamar 5		Pts: Patrick Cabahug 23; Rebs: Jaymar Gimpayan 13; Asts: Andrey Armenion 6

Ynares Sports Arena, Pasig
Referees: J. Santiago, E. Avis, E. Villarosa,

One PH
One Sports+

October 25
09:00 pm

Boxscore

San Juan Knights	90–79	Valenzuela XUR Homes Realty Inc.
Scoring by quarter: 23–14, 24–21, 17–19, 26–25
Pts: Dexter Maiquez 20; Rebs: Joseph Celso 9 Asts: Judel Fuentes 6		Pts: Jaymar Gimpayan 17; Rebs: Jaymar Gimpayan 14; Asts: four players 3
San Juan wins series, 2–0

Filoil EcoOil Centre, San Juan
Referees: E. Alejo, S. Pingol, R. Agbalo,

This is the first playoff meeting between the Knights and Valenzuela.

Head-to-head matchup

One PH
IWantTFC

May 30
9:00 pm

Boxscore

San Juan Knights	90–74	Valenzuela XUR Homes Realty Inc.
Scoring by quarter: 17–12, 24–20, 27–20, 22–22
Pts: Mark Acosta 18; Rebs: Jammer Jamito 7 Asts: Mon Abundo 6		Pts: Patrick Cabahug 15; Rebs: Felix Apreku 19; Asts: three players 2

Filoil EcoOil Centre, San Juan

==== (4) Pampanga Giant Lanterns vs. (5) Bataan Risers ====
One PH
One Sports+

October 15
05:30 pm

Boxscore

Pampanga Giant Lanterns	82–75	Bataan Risers
Scoring by quarter: 21–14, 13–21, 19–21, 29–19
Pts: Archie Concepcion 21; Rebs: Jammer Jamito 10; Asts: three players 4		Pts: Gio Espuelas 18; Rebs: Gio Espuelas, James Castro 6 Asts: Kristoffer Torrado 8

Nueva Ecija Coliseum, Palayan, Nueva Ecija
Referees: J. Belnas, R. Agbalo, J. Medillo,

One PH
One Sports+

October 22
09:00 pm

Boxscore

Pampanga Giant Lanterns	83–85 (OT)	Bataan Risers
Scoring by quarter: 20–22, 24–19, 14–14, 16–21, Overtime: 9–11
Pts: MJ Garcia 23; Rebs: Alex Ramos 11; Asts: Alex Ramos 4		Pts: Kristoffer Torrado 22; Rebs: Arvie Bringas 13; Asts: James Castro 8

Bren Guiao Convention Center,
San Fernando, Pampanga
Referees: J. Belnas, A. Dasal, B. Estroga,

One PH
One Sports+

November 4
6:30 pm

Boxscore

Pampanga Giant Lanterns	66–62	Bataan Risers
Scoring by quarter: 22–12, 12–18, 16–13, 16–19
Pts: Archie Concepcion, Christopher Lagrama 13; Rebs: Jammer Jamito 12; Asts: three players 4		Pts: James Castro 14; Rebs: Ric Gallardo 11; Asts: Ronjay Lastimosa 5
Pampanga wins series, 2–1

Bren Guiao Convention Center,
San Fernando, Pampanga
Referees: J. Belnas, R. Agbalo, R. Brila,

This is the second playoff meeting between the Giant Lanterns and Risers with the Giant Lanterns winning the first one in the 2020–21 playoffs.

Head-to-head matchup

One PH
IWantTFC

September 12
9:00 pm

Boxscore

Pampanga Giant Lanterns	86–83	Bataan Risers
Scoring by quarter: 25–13, 15–15, 30–28, 16–27
Pts: Alex Ramos 17; Rebs: Alex Ramos 11; Asts: Christopher Lagrama 8		Pts: James Castro 24; Rebs: Jethro Sombero 11; Asts: Kristoffer Torrado 11

Bren Guiao Convention Center,
San Fernando, Pampanga
Referees: Ramon Santiago Jr., Edmar Avis, Benjie Estroga

Previous playoffs series
Pampanga leads 1–0 in all-time playoff series

2020

Pampanga Giant Lanterns 2, Bataan Risers 0

2020 Northern Division First Round

=== Southern Division ===
==== (1) Zamboanga Family's Brand Sardines vs. (8) Muntinlupa Cagers ====
One PH
One Sports+

October 17
09:00 pm

Boxscore

Zamboanga Family's Brand Sardines	79–50	Muntinlupa Cagers
Scoring by quarter: 18–11, 13–8, 23–14, 25–17
Pts: Jul-Ashri Ignacio 15; Rebs: Jaycee Marcelino 8 Asts: Jayvee Marcelino 8		Pts: Domark Matillano 10; Rebs: Ivan Villanueva 6 Asts: John Catimbuhan Jr. 4

Mayor Vitaliano D. Agan Coliseum, Zamboanga City
Referees: A. Manzano, E. Alejo, R. Agbalo,

One PH
One Sports+

October 24
06:30 pm

Boxscore

Zamboanga Family's Brand Sardines	77–71	Muntinlupa Cagers
Scoring by quarter: 25–14, 18–17, 17–19, 17–21
Pts: Jaycee Marcelino 24; Rebs: Jaycee Marcelino 11; Asts: Jaycee Marcelino 11		Pts: Biboy Enguio, Domark Matillano 16; Rebs: Harold Arboleda 7 Asts: Domark Matillano 4
Zamboanga wins series, 2–0

Batangas City Coliseum, Batangas City
Referees: A. Manzano, S. Pingol Jr, E. Villarosa,

This is the second playoff meeting between Zamboanga and the Cagers with Zamboanga winning the first one in the 2019 playoffs.

Head-to-head matchup

One PH
IWantTFC

August 29
5:00 pm

Boxscore

Zamboanga Family's Brand Sardines	80–77	Muntinlupa Cagers
Scoring by quarter: 8–22, 23–23, 30–15, 19–17
Pts: Chito Jaime 18; Rebs: Jayson Grimaldo 10; Asts: Jaycee Marcelino 6		Pts: Domark Matillano 18; Rebs: Harold Arboleda 9 Asts: John Catimbuhan, Jr. 8

Bren Guiao Convention Center,
San Fernando, Pampanga
Referees: Jonald Belnas, Eduardo Villarosa, Jun Macalio

Previous playoffs series
Zamboanga leads 1–0 in all-time playoff series

2019

Muntinlupa Cagers 1, Zamboanga Valientes 2

2019 Southern Division First Round

==== (2) Batangas City Embassy Chill vs. (7) Bacoor City Strikers ====
One PH
One Sports+

October 21
09:00 pm

Boxscore

Batangas City Embassy Chill	69–55	Bacoor City Strikers
Scoring by quarter: 19–10, 11–21, 20–10, 19–14
Pts: Juneric Baloria 19; Rebs: Cedric Ablaza 15; Asts: Rudy Lingganay 5		Pts: Mark Pangilinan 11; Rebs: Mark Montuano 13; Asts: Ian Melencio, RJ Jimenez 4

Batangas City Coliseum, Batangas City
Referees: A. Manzano, S. Pingol Jr, J. Medillo,

One PH
One Sports+

October 28
06:30 pm

Boxscore

Batangas City Embassy Chill	75–78	Bacoor City Strikers
Scoring by quarter: 21–24, 16–11, 17–25, 21–18
Pts: Levi Hernandez 22; Rebs: Cedric Ablaza 19; Asts: Justine dela Virgen, Rudy Lingganay 6		Pts: RJ Ramirez 19; Rebs: Mark Montuano 8 Asts: Dave Moralde 9

Ynares Sports Arena, Pasig
Referees: J. Castroverde, E. Avis, S. Pingol Jr,

One PH
One Sports+

November 5
9:00 pm

Boxscore

Batangas City Embassy Chill	70–57	Bacoor City Strikers
Scoring by quarter: 17–10, 16–15, 21–9, 16–23
Pts: Cedric Ablaza 13; Rebs: Jeckster Apinan 14; Asts: Rudy Lingganay 5		Pts: Jan Jamon 18; Rebs: Mark Montuano 11; Asts: RJ Ramirez 3
Batangas City wins series, 2–1

Batangas City Coliseum, Batangas City
Referees: J. Ocfemia, E. Avis, B. Estroga,

This is the first playoff meeting between Batangas City and the Strikers.

Head-to-head matchup

One PH
IWantTFC

August 30
7:00 pm

Boxscore

Batangas City Embassy Chill	87–86	Bacoor City Strikers
Scoring by quarter: 21–21, 12–12, 23–20, 31–33
Pts: Levi Hernandez 25; Rebs: Jeckster Apinan, John Rey Villanueva 9 Asts: Jeckster Apinan 7		Pts: RJ Ramirez 18; Rebs: Mark Montuano 14; Asts: Ian Melencio 7

Orion Sports Complex, Orion, Bataan

==== (3) Sarangani Marlins vs. (6) Rizal EMKAI Xentromall ====
One PH
One Sports+

October 21
06:30 pm

Boxscore

Sarangani Marlins	45–73	Rizal EMKAI Xentromall
Scoring by quarter: 16–17, 3–20, 9–17, 17–19
Pts: Jonjon Gabriel 5 Rebs: Danny Marilao 7 Asts: Kyt Jimenez 3		Pts: Jolo Mendoza 17; Rebs: Jolo Mendoza, Troy Mallillin 9 Asts: Keanu Caballero 5

Batangas City Coliseum, Batangas City
Referees: H. Scott, B. Estroga, R. Agbalo,

One PH
One Sports+

October 28
09:00 pm

Boxscore

Sarangani Marlins	79–84 (OT)	Rizal EMKAI Xentromall
Scoring by quarter: 15–12, 25–14, 15–24, 18–23, Overtime: 6–11
Pts: Kyt Jimenez 24; Rebs: Gabby Espinas 11; Asts: Yvan Ludovice 5		Pts: Jolo Mendoza 26; Rebs: Troy Mallillin 9 Asts: Keanu Caballero 5
Rizal wins series, 2–0

Ynares Sports Arena, Pasig
Referees: M. De Luna, H. Alejo, R. Brila,

This is the first playoff meeting between the Marlins and Rizal.

Head-to-head matchup

One PH
IWantTFC

May 21
9:00 pm

Boxscore

Sarangani Marlins	94–83	Rizal EMKAI Xentromall
Scoring by quarter: 20–16, 24–15, 26–24, 24–28
Pts: Kyt Jimenez 20; Rebs: Gabby Espinas 12; Asts: Yvan Ludovice 9		Pts: Laurenz Victoria 24; Rebs: Mark Benitez, Marwin Dionisio 6 Asts: Keanu Caballero 5

Ynares Center, Antipolo, Rizal
Referees: Gerry Gabriel, Norberto Gica, Severino Pingol

==== (4) GenSan Warriors vs. (5) Bacolod Bingo Plus ====
One PH
One Sports+

October 17
06:30 pm

Boxscore

GenSan Warriors	77–81	Bacolod Bingo Plus
Scoring by quarter: 14–17, 20–14, 15–26, 28–24
Pts: Christopher Magsaglang 13; Rebs: Christian Fajarito 10; Asts: Mark Cruz 4		Pts: Alwin Alday, Jhan Nermal 20; Rebs: Mark Yee 12; Asts: Aaron Jeruta 6

Mayor Vitaliano D. Agan Coliseum, Zamboanga City
Referees: M. De Luna, A. Dasal, J. Medillo,

One PH
One Sports+

October 24
09:00 pm

Boxscore

GenSan Warriors	77–72	Bacolod Bingo Plus
Scoring by quarter: 23–16, 21–14, 11–17, 22–25
Pts: Nikko Panganiban 24; Rebs: Dhon Reverente 11; Asts: Mark Cruz 9		Pts: Jhan Nermal 25; Rebs: Jhan Nermal 11; Asts: Aaron Jeruta 4

Batangas City Coliseum, Batangas City
Referees: E. Avis, R. Brila, R. Santiago,

One PH
One Sports+

November 5
5:30 pm

Boxscore

GenSan Warriors	73–77	Bacolod Bingo Plus
Scoring by quarter: 19–16, 13–20, 23–22, 18–19
Pts: Christian Pajarito 17; Rebs: Dhon Reverente 9 Asts: Mark Cruz 5		Pts: Jhan Nermal 21; Rebs: Mark Yee 13; Asts: Joel Yu 5
Bacolod wins series, 2–1

Batangas City Coliseum, Batangas City
Referees: J. Castroverde, S. Pingol Jr, R. Gabriel,

This is the first playoff meeting between the Warriors and Bacolod.

Head-to-head matchup

One PH
IWantTFC

September 5
9:00 pm

Boxscore

GenSan Warriors	76–73	Bacolod Bingo Plus
Scoring by quarter: 15–8, 28–29, 15–16, 18–20
Pts: Nikko Panganiban 16; Rebs: Marlon Gomez 13; Asts: Mark Cruz, Marlon Gomez 5		Pts: Mark Yee 22; Rebs: Mark Yee, Jhan Nermal 10; Asts: Aaron Jeruta 6

General Santos City Gym,
General Santos
Referees: Edmar Avis, Eduardo Villarosa, Benjie Estroga

== Division semifinals ==
=== Northern Division ===
==== (1) Nueva Ecija Rice Vanguards vs. (4) Pampanga Giant Lanterns ====
One PH
One Sports+

November 7
9:00 pm

Boxscore

Nueva Ecija Rice Vanguards	104–89	Pampanga Giant Lanterns
Scoring by quarter: 25–14, 26–28, 22–28, 31–19
Pts: John Villarias 20; Rebs: Michael Mabulac 9 Asts: Hesed Gabo 13		Pts: Jammer Jamito 17; Rebs: Jammer Jamito 9 Asts: Archie Concepcion, MJ Garcia 4

Nueva Ecija Coliseum, Palayan, Nueva Ecija
Referees: J. Belnas, R. Brila, E. Villarosa,

One PH
One Sports+

November 11
6:30 pm

Boxscore

Nueva Ecija Rice Vanguards	89–84	Pampanga Giant Lanterns
Scoring by quarter: 21–15, 21–22, 24–30, 23–17
Pts: Michael Mabulac 23; Rebs: Michael Mabulac 10; Asts: Hesed Gabo 8		Pts: Archie Concepcion 20; Rebs: Earnest Reyes 9 Asts: Archie Concepcion 4
Nueva Ecija wins series, 2–0

Filoil EcoOil Centre, San Juan
Referees: E. Alejo, J. Dela Cruz, B. Estroga,

This is the first playoff meeting between the Rice Vanguards and the Giant Lanterns.

Head-to-head matchup

One PH
IWantTFC

September 23
9:00 pm

Boxscore

Nueva Ecija Rice Vanguards	80–74	Pampanga Giant Lanterns
Scoring by quarter: 19–23, 12–23, 25–16, 24–12
Pts: Hesed Gabo 17; Rebs: Bobby Balucanag 9 Asts: Hesed Gabo 5		Pts: Archie Concepcion 16; Rebs: Earnest Reyes, Michael Garcia 6 Asts: Christopher Lagrama 4

Nueva Ecija Coliseum, Palayan, Nueva Ecija

==== (2) Pasig City MCW Sports vs. (3) San Juan Knights ====
One PH
One Sports+

November 7
6:30 pm

Boxscore

Pasig City MCW Sports	68–88	San Juan Knights
Scoring by quarter: 11–22, 21–21, 16–19, 20–26
Pts: Jason Melano 26; Rebs: Jason Ballesteros 11; Asts: Aldeo Lucero 5		Pts: Dexter Maiquez 19; Rebs: Michael Calisaan 8 Asts: Orlan Wamar 10

Nueva Ecija Coliseum, Palayan, Nueva Ecija
Referees: A. Manzano, B. Estroga, R. Agbalo,

One PH
One Sports+

November 11
9:00 pm

Boxscore

Pasig City MCW Sports	70–81	San Juan Knights
Scoring by quarter: 15–21, 17–25, 16–17, 22–18
Pts: Jason Melano 19; Rebs: Jason Melano, Jason Ballesteros 10; Asts: Aldeo Lucero, Ryan Costelo 4		Pts: Michael Calisaan 18; Rebs: Dexter Maiquez 10; Asts: Orlan Wamar 13
San Juan wins series, 2–0

Filoil EcoOil Centre, San Juan
Referees: J. Belnas, A. Manzano, R. Brila,

This is the first playoff meeting between Pasig City and the Knights.

Head-to-head matchup

One PH
IWantTFC

August 13
7:00 pm

Boxscore

Pasig City MCW Sports	68–64	San Juan Knights
Scoring by quarter: 15–21, 22–12 37 33, 9–14 46 47, 24–17
Pts: Carlo Lastimosa 22; Rebs: Jason Melano 13; Asts: Robbie Manalang 5		Pts: Jammer Jamito 18; Rebs: Mon Abundo 11; Asts: Orlan Wamar 9

Batangas City Coliseum, Batangas City

=== Southern Division ===
==== (1) Zamboanga Family's Brand Sardines vs. (5) Bacolod Bingo Plus ====
One PH
One Sports+

November 8
9:00 pm

Boxscore

Zamboanga Family's Brand Sardines	71–65	Bacolod Bingo Plus
Scoring by quarter: 11–19, 14–14, 19–17, 27–15
Pts: Jaycee Marcelino 21; Rebs: Jaycee Marcelino 13; Asts: Jayvee Marcelino 8		Pts: Jeramer Cabanag 14; Rebs: Mark Yee 11; Asts: Kraniel Villoria 5

Mayor Vitaliano Agan Coliseum, Zamboanga City
Referees: E. Avis, R. Agbalo, H. Alejo,

One PH
One Sports+

November 12
6:30 pm

Boxscore

Zamboanga Family's Brand Sardines	58–61	Bacolod Bingo Plus
Scoring by quarter: 12–13, 10–14, 22–18, 14–16
Pts: Jhaymo Enguilos 14; Rebs: Jhaymo Enguilos 8 Asts: Jaycee Marcelino 8		Pts: Alwyn Alday 21; Rebs: Mark Yee 13; Asts: Mark Yee 5

Batangas City Coliseum, Batangas City
Referees: J. Ocfemia, E. Villarosa, J. Macailo,

One PH
One Sports+

November 15
6:30 pm

Boxscore

Zamboanga Family's Brand Sardines	77–65	Bacolod Bingo Plus
Scoring by quarter: 26–12, 16–17, 16–16, 19–20
Pts: Jaycee Marcelino 21; Rebs: Chris Dumapig 9 Asts: three players 6		Pts: Jhan Nermal 14; Rebs: Mark Yee 11; Asts: Mark Yee, Alwyn Alday 2
Zamboanga wins series, 2–1

Mayor Vitaliano D. Agan Coliseum, Zamboanga City
Referees: S. Pingol, J. Medillo, J. Ocfemia,

This is the first playoff meeting between Zamboanga and Bacolod.

Head-to-head matchup

One PH
IWantTFC

July 19
9:00 pm

Boxscore

Zamboanga Family's Brand Sardines	74–71	Bacolod Bingo Plus
Scoring by quarter: 24–15, 16–17, 15–24, 19–15
Pts: Jaycee Marcelino 18; Rebs: Jaycee Marcelino, Chito Jaime 12; Asts: Jaycee Marcelino 5		Pts: Mark Yee 16; Rebs: Mark Yee 12; Asts: Aaron Jeruta 5

USLS Coliseum, Bacolod

==== (2) Batangas City Embassy Chill vs. (6) Rizal Golden Coolers Xentromall ====
One PH
One Sports+

November 8
6:30 pm

Boxscore

Batangas City Embassy Chill	70–60	Rizal Golden Coolers Xentromall
Scoring by quarter: 16–13, 17–7, 23–23, 14–17
Pts: Levi Hernandez 20; Rebs: Cedric Ablaza 12; Asts: Mark dela Virgen 6		Pts: Troy Mallillin 13; Rebs: John Gob 9 Asts: Alvin Capobres 5

Mayor Vitaliano Agan Coliseum, Zamboanga City
Referees: J. Ocfemia, E. Villarosa, S. Pingol Jr,

One PH
One Sports+

November 12
9:00 pm

Boxscore

Batangas City Embassy Chill	72–66	Rizal Golden Coolers Xentromall
Scoring by quarter: 14–17, 20–18, 19–16, 19–15
Pts: Cedric Ablaza 19; Rebs: Cedric Ablaza 12; Asts: Mark dela Virgen 5		Pts: Jolo Mendoza 18; Rebs: John Gob, Mark Benitez 6 Asts: Keanu Caballero 9
Batangas City wins series 2–0

Batangas City Coliseum, Batangas City
Referees: E. Avis, S. Pingol, Jr A. Dasal,

This is the first playoff meeting between Batangas City and the Golden Coolers.

Head-to-head matchup

One PH
IWantTFC

September 12
5:00 pm

Boxscore

Batangas City Embassy Chill	68–65	Rizal Golden Coolers Xentromall
Scoring by quarter: 25–8, 19–14, 14–17, 10–26
Pts: Cedric Ablaza 13; Rebs: Jeckster Apinan 14; Asts: Jeckster Apinan, Joshua Gonzales 5		Pts: Laurenz Victoria 16; Rebs: Troy Mallillin 9 Asts: Keanu Caballero 8

Bren Guiao Convention Center, San Fernando, Pampanga

== Division finals ==
=== Northern Division ===
==== (1) Nueva Ecija Rice Vanguards vs. (3) San Juan Knights ====
One PH
One Sports+

November 18
6:30 pm

Boxscore

Nueva Ecija Rice Vanguards	72–79	San Juan Knights
Scoring by quarter: 16–26, 20–10, 20–14, 16–29
Pts: Michael Juico 13; Rebs: William McAloney 11; Asts: Hesed Gabo 5		Pts: Michael Calisaan 19; Rebs: Michael Calisaan 13; Asts: Orlan Wamar 9

Nueva Ecija Coliseum, Palayan, Nueva Ecija
Referees: R. Santiago, R. Agbalo, R. Brila,

One PH
One Sports+

November 21
6:30 pm

Boxscore

Nueva Ecija Rice Vanguards	89–83 (OT)	San Juan Knights
Scoring by quarter: 29–14, 20–16, 15–28, 12–18, Overtime: 13–7
Pts: JR Taganas 19; Rebs: JR Taganas 15; Asts: Michael Juico 4		Pts: Judel Fuentes 27; Rebs: Dexter Maiquez 10; Asts: Marwin Taywan 5

Filoil EcoOil Centre, San Juan
Referees: J Belnas, B Estroga, E. Villarosa,

One PH
One Sports+

November 25
6:30 pm

Boxscore

Nueva Ecija Rice Vanguards	84–68	San Juan Knights
Scoring by quarter: 19–15, 22–24, 23–14, 20–15
Pts: John Villarias 19; Rebs: Michael Mabulac 11; Asts: Chris Bitoon, John Villarias 6		Pts: Orlan Wamar 16; Rebs: three players 6 Asts: Judel Fuentes 4
Nueva Ecija wins series, 2–1

Nueva Ecija Coliseum, Palayan, Nueva Ecija
Referees: J. Belnas, J. Ocfemia, J. Castroverde,

This is the first playoff meeting between the Rice Vanguards and the Knights.

Head-to-head matchup

One PH
IWantTFC

July 12
9:00 pm

Boxscore

Nueva Ecija Rice Vanguards	81–75	San Juan Knights
Scoring by quarter: 18–23, 18–19, 18–21, 27–12
Pts: William McAloney 24; Rebs: Michael Juico 10; Asts: John Raymundo 6		Pts: Mark Anthony Acosta 13; Rebs: Jammer Jamito 8 Asts: Justin Gutang, Orlan Wamar 5

Nueva Ecija Coliseum, Palayan, Nueva Ecija

=== Southern Division ===
==== (1) Zamboanga Family's Brand Sardines vs. (2) Batangas City Embassy Chill ====
One PH
One Sports+

November 19
6:30 pm

Boxscore

Zamboanga Family's Brand Sardines	71–80	Batangas City Embassy Chill
Scoring by quarter: 16–17, 13–20, 17–29, 25–14
Pts: Jaycee Marcelino 22; Rebs: Chris Dumapig 8 Asts: Jayvee Marcelino, Jerald Bautista 5		Pts: Juneric Baloria 19; Rebs: three players 8 Asts: Mark dela Virgen 6

Mayor Vitaliano D. Agan Coliseum, Zamboanga City
Referees: A. Manzano, E. Villarosa, B. Estroga,

One PH
One Sports+

November 22
6:30 pm

Boxscore

Zamboanga Family's Brand Sardines	63–53	Batangas City Embassy Chill
Scoring by quarter: 24–14, 6–20, 18–10, 15–9
Pts: Jerald Bautista 17; Rebs: Jhaymo Enguilos 10; Asts: Jaycee Marcelino 7		Pts: Cedric Ablaza 13; Rebs: Dawn Ochea 11; Asts: Mark dela Virgen 6

Batangas City Coliseum, Batangas City
Referees: H. Scott, D. Dela Cruz, E. Macailo,

One PH
One Sports+

November 26
5:30 pm

Boxscore

Zamboanga Family's Brand Sardines	67–66	Batangas City Embassy Chill
Scoring by quarter: 16–23, 14–21, 16–13, 21–9
Pts: Jerald Bautista 15; Rebs: Jaycee Marcelino 7 Asts: Jaycee Marcelino 5		Pts: Juneric Baloria 16; Rebs: Cedric Ablaza 10; Asts: Mark dela Virgen 6
Zamboanga wins series, 2–1

Mayor Vitaliano D. Agan Coliseum, Zamboanga City
Referees: E. Villarosa, B. Estroga, E. Macailo,

This is the third playoff meeting between Zamboanga and Batangas City with Zamboanga tied in first two meetings.

Head-to-head matchup

One PH
IWantTFC

August 1
9:00 pm

Boxscore

Zamboanga Family's Brand Sardines	83–87	Batangas City Embassy Chill
Scoring by quarter: 20–21, 18–9, 22–27, 23–30
Pts: Jaycee Marcelino 26; Rebs: Chris Dumapig 9 Asts: Jayvee Marcelino 6		Pts: Levi Hernandez 36; Rebs: Cedric Ablaza 21; Asts: Mark dela Virgen, Vincent Importante 3

Batangas City Coliseum,
Batangas City
Referees: Severino Pingol, Benjie Estroga, Allan Manzano

Previous playoffs series
Tied in all-time playoff series, 1–1

2019

Batangas City Athletics 2, Zamboanga Family's Brand Sardines 1

2019 Southern Division semifinals

2020

Batangas City Athletics 1, Zamboanga Family's Brand Sardines 2

2020 Southern Division First Round

== 2022 MPBL finals: (N1) Nueva Ecija Rice Vanguards vs. (S1) Zamboanga Family's Brand Sardines ==
The Nueva Ecija Rice Vanguards and the Zamboanga Family's Brand Sardines competed in the MPBL finals to determine the fourth MPBL champion.

One PH
One Sports+

December 2
6:30 pm

Boxscore

Nueva Ecija Rice Vanguards	81–75	Zamboanga Family's Brand Sardines
Scoring by quarter: 15–14, 14–16, 27–18, 25–27
Pts: Hesed Gabo 22; Rebs: Michael Juico 11; Asts: Hesed Gabo 6		Pts: Chris Dumapig 15; Rebs: Jhaymo Enguilos 8 Asts: Jaycee Marcelino 8
Nueva Ecija lead series, 1–0

Nueva Ecija Coliseum, Palayan, Nueva Ecija
Referees: J. Belnas, R. Brila, J. Castroverde,

One PH
One Sports+

December 5
6:30 pm

Boxscore

Nueva Ecija Rice Vanguards	75–74	Zamboanga Family's Brand Sardines
Scoring by quarter: 13–20, 24–18, 21–12, 17–24
Pts: Jay Collado 13; Rebs: Michael Juico, Will McAloney 9 Asts: Michael Mabulac 4		Pts: Jaycee Marcelino 26; Rebs: Jaycee Marcelino 7 Asts: three players 4
Nueva Ecija lead series, 2–0

Nueva Ecija Coliseum, Palayan, Nueva Ecija
Referees: S. Pingolz, J. Ocfemia, B. Estroga,

One PH
One Sports+

December 9
9:00 pm

Boxscore

Nueva Ecija Rice Vanguards	65–75	Zamboanga Family's Brand Sardines
Scoring by quarter: 16–16, 12–22, 20–15, 17–22
Pts: Michael Mabulac 15; Rebs: Michael Mabulac, Will McAloney 8 Asts: Chris Bitoon 6		Pts: Jaycee Marcelino 22; Rebs: Jaycee Marcelino 10; Asts: Jaycee Marcelino 9
Nueva Ecija lead series 2–1

Mayor Vitaliano D. Agan Coliseum, Zamboanga City
Referees: A. Manzano, J. Macailo, E. Villarosa,

One PH
One Sports+

December 12
6:30 pm

Boxscore

Nueva Ecija Rice Vanguards	69–56	Zamboanga Family's Brand Sardines
Scoring by quarter: 15–15, 25–9, 9–16, 20–16
Pts: John Villarias 14; Rebs: John Villarias, JR Taganas 10; Asts: Hesed Gabo 9		Pts: Jaycee Marcelino 17; Rebs: Jhaymo Enguilos, Ralph Tansingco 8 Asts: Jayvee Marcelino 3
Nueva Ecija wins series 3–1

Mayor Vitaliano D. Agan Coliseum, Zamboanga City

This was the first championship meeting between the Rice Vanguards and Zamboanga.

Head-to-head matchup

One PH
IWantTFC

August 8
9:00 pm

Boxscore

Nueva Ecija Rice Vanguards	81–76	Zamboanga Family's Brand Sardines
Scoring by quarter: 11–13, 27–16, 21–27, 22–20
Pts: Michael Juico 16; Rebs: Michael Mabulac 7 Asts: Hesed Gabo 13		Pts: Jaycee Marcelino, Jerald Bautista 15; Rebs: Chris Dumapig 12; Asts: Irven Palencia 5
