= Michael Juico =

Filipino basketball player (born 1989)

Free agent
- Position: Shooting guard / point guard

Personal information
- Born: September 24, 1989 (age 37) Pampanga, Philippines
- Listed height: 6 ft 0 in (1.83 m)
- Listed weight: 140 lb (64 kg)

Career information
- College: Olivarez (2007); San Sebastian (2012)
- PBA draft: 2017: 3rd round, 30th overall pick
- Drafted by: Rain or Shine Elasto Painters
- Playing career: 2017–present

Career history
- 2017–2018: GlobalPort Batang Pier
- 2018–2020: Pampanga Giant Lanterns
- 2020: Pampanga Delta
- 2021: Basilan Peace Riders / Jumbo Plastic
- 2022–2024: Nueva Ecija Capitals / Rice Vanguards
- 2024–2025: Pangasinan Heatwaves / Abono Reapers

Career highlights
- MPBL champion (2022); 2x MPBL All-Star (2020, 2024); VisMin champion (2021 – 1st); NBL champion (2020); FilBasket champion (2022); FilBasket Finals MVP (2022); FilBasket All-Defensive Team (2022)

Michael Vincent Galang Juico (born September 24, 1989) is a Filipino professional basketball former player who last played for the Pangasinan Heatwaves franchise of the Maharlika Pilipinas Basketball League (MPBL) and Pilipinas Super League (PSL).

He was drafted 30th overall in the 2017 PBA draft by the Rain or Shine Elasto Painters. Although he had a short PBA career, he has since won titles in other leagues, both in the amateur and professional level.

== College career ==
Juico started his college career by playing for the Olivarez College Sea Lions in the Universities and Colleges Athletic Association (UCAA). He then played for the San Sebastian Stags. In 2012, in a preseason match against the EAC Generals, he was thrown out of the game for getting into a fight with the other team. His best game was in Season 88 against the Perpetual Altas in which he scored 15 points. He left the team after that season.

== Amateur career ==
Juico joined Wang's Basketball in the PBA D-League in the 2013–14 Aspirants' Cup. In the 2014 Foundation Cup, he played for the Derulo Accelero Oilers. He then applied for the 2014 PBA Draft. However, he backed out. He returned to Wang's Basketball in the 2014–15 Aspirants' Cup.

Juico stopped playing basketball from 2015 until 2017. In 2017, he returned to Wang's Basketball for the 2017 Foundation Cup.

== Professional career ==
=== GlobalPort Batang Pier ===
After his time in the PBA D-League, Juico applied for the 2017 PBA draft. There, he was drafted in the third round by the Rain or Shine Elasto Painters. However, he wasn't signed by them. Instead, he was signed by the GlobalPort Batang Pier on a one-conference deal. On June 1, 2018, he was waived by the team.

=== Pampanga Giant Lanterns ===
Not long after he was waived, Juico joined the Pampanga Lanterns. On July 17, 2018, he scored a career-high 35 points with seven rebounds and three steals in a win over the Parañaque Patriots. The 35 points was also the most points scored in the MPBL, breaking the record set by Yves Sason. In a win over the Navotas Clutch, he led with 25 points, six boards and three assists. In a win over the Muntinlupa Cagers, he led with 26 points, 12 boards and seven assists. He then scored 29 points, seven rebounds, three assists, three steals, and a block win over the Mandaluyong El Tigre. That season, they didn't qualify for the playoffs.

In a loss to the Bicol Volcanoes during the 2019–20 season, Juico led the team with 14 points and seven rebounds. He then got a double-double of 13 points and 10 rebounds in a win over the Biñan City Heroes. In a win over the Valenzuela Classic, he contributed 17 points. He got another double-double of 16 points and 16 rebounds in a win over Muntinlupa that helped them get the fifth seed. He got a season-high 26 points with 12 rebounds in a win over the Nueva Ecija Rice Vanguards. In an overtime win over the Batangas City Athletics, he got a double-double of 13 points and 12 rebounds. He then scored 19 points with eight rebounds and two assists in a win over the Rizal Golden Coolers that sealed Pampanga's slot in the playoffs. He followed it up with an all-around performance of 15 points and 13 rebounds alongside four assists, two steals, and a block in a win over the Cebu Casino Ethyl Alcohol. Pampanga secured the fourth seed with a win over the Pasig Sta. Lucia Realtors in which he scored 20 points and six rebounds. In the All-Star Game (which he started), he led the North All-Stars with 23 points, nine rebounds, and four assists. In Game 2 of the first round of the playoffs, he had 14 points, seven rebounds, and blocked Reed Juntilla's game-tying three pointer attempt to book Pampanga into the division semifinals. Against the San Juan Knights in Game 1 of the division semifinals, he led with 18 points, eight rebounds, and five assists, but turned the ball over five times as they lost. He only played in the first quarter of the following game which Pampanga lost, as he was disqualified for hitting a San Juan player. A week later, he and his teammate Mark Cruz were investigated for game-fixing. Due to the COVID-19 pandemic, the case against them was not developed.

=== Pampanga Delta ===
In 2020, Juico joined the Pampanga Delta of the National Basketball League (NBL) in their finals series against the La Union Paower. He debuted in a Game 1 win with 14 points, five rebounds, and five assists. In Game 3, he led all scorers with 26 points, as they took a 2–1 lead. Pampanga won the next game, making them champions of the league.

=== Basilan Peace Makers and AICC Manila ===
In 2021, Juico signed with the Basilan Peace Riders in the Pilipinas VisMin Super Cup for the 1st conference. In a win over the Iligan City Archangels, he contributed 13 points, seven rebounds, and three assists. They constantly routed their opponents, including a 66-point rout of JPS Zamboanga City in which he led with 21 points on 10-of-12 shooting from the field to go with five rebounds in just 13 points. The Peace Riders went on to sweep the elimination round, advancing straight to the finals. They also swept the finals, meaning from the start of the eliminations to when they won the championship, they had won 13 straight games.

The core of the Basilan Peace Makers, including Juico, then formed the Almerial International Construction Corporation (AICC) Manila team, which competed in the 2021 FilBasket Subic Championship, an amateur preseason tournament. After losing their first game of the tournament, they went on to win their next five games, including a win over 7A Primus in which he scored 19 points. AICC Manila then went on to win the championship in three games.

After that, they returned to the MPBL to compete in that year's Invitational, a preseason tournament. In the first game of the tournament, he led Basilan to a win over the Bicol with 24 points, six rebounds, four assists, and three steals. He then picked up 25 points, nine rebounds and two assists in a win over the Marikina Shoe City. They swept their group 4–0. In the semis, he led with an all-around 23 points, five assists, five rebounds, and four steals to send Basilan to the finals. He made it to the Mythical Five with averages of 19.0 points, 3.8 assists, 6.5 rebounds, and a steal. However, he felt that he deserved MVP, which he lost to Michael Mabulac, and motivated him in the finals. In the finals, he scored 15 points, an assist and had just gotten his fifth rebound of the game when both his calves cramped up with three minutes remaining in overtime. He was subbed out, but returned to the game in the final minute. There, he made the game-winning assist to Philip Manalang, who made the game-winning three-pointer.

=== Nueva Ecija Rice Vanguards ===
In 2022, Juico started playing for the Nueva Ecija Rice Vanguards. He first played for them in the 2022 FilBasket Summer Championship, now a professional tournament. He made the All-Defensive Team for that tournament. He also got Finals MVP, as he led Nueva Ecija to the title with 17 points, nine rebounds, four assists, two steals, and a block.

Juico started the 2022 MPBL season with 13 points and nine rebounds in a win over the Mindoro Tamaraws. On July 26, 2022, he became the 5th member of the MPBL's 1,000 points club when he scored 17 points along with five rebounds and five assists in a win over the Bacoor City Strikers. He had 18 points, six rebounds, and five assists in a win over the Quezon City Capitals. That season, Nueva Ecija swept the regular season, winning 21 straight games. They then swept the semis as well. Their winning streak ended at 25 games in game 1 of the finals. In Game 3, he led the team to the win with 12 points, nine rebounds, and three steals. Nueva Ecija won the next game and they claimed the championship.

In 2023, Nueva Ecija renewed Juico's contract. They started the season 12–1. In a win over Batangas, although he only scored 10 points, he contributed eight rebounds, six assists, and four steals. In an upset loss to the Quezon Huskers, he had 16 points and 13 rebounds. That season, they failed to defend their title, as they were defeated in the division semifinals by San Juan.

=== Pangasinan Heatwaves ===
On June 26, 2024, Juico was traded to the Pangasinan Heatwaves alongside Nat Cosejo, and JP Maguilano for Ed Daquioag, Jeff Javillonar, and Chester Saldua.

On January 7, 2026, it was announced that the Heatwaves would be taking a leave of absence from the league, leaving him without a team to play for.

== Career statistics ==
Legend
GP	Games played	MPG	Minutes per game
FG%	Field-goal percentage	3P%	3-point field-goal percentage	FT%	Free-throw percentage
RPG	Rebounds per game	APG	Assists per game	SPG	Steals per game
BPG	Blocks per game	PPG	Points per game	**Bold**	Career high

=== PBA ===
==== Season-by-season averages ====
Year	Team	GP	MPG	FG%	3P%	FT%	RPG	APG	SPG	BPG	PPG
2017–18	GlobalPort	12	6.1	.625	.000	.600	.5	.2	.2	.1	1.9
Career		12	6.1	.625	.000	.600	.5	.2	.2	.1	1.9

=== NCAA ===
Year	Team	GP	MPG	FG%	3P%	FT%	RPG	APG	SPG	BPG	PPG
2012–13	San Sebastian	19	17.3	.423	.167	.636	3.2	1.5	.3	.2	6.2
Career		19	17.3	.423	.167	.636	3.2	1.5	.3	.2	6.2
