= Hesed Gabo =

Filipino basketball player (born 1992)

No. 35 – GenSan Warriors
- Position: Point guard / Shooting guard
- League: MPBL

Personal information
- Born: March 21, 1992 (age 34)
- Listed height: 5 ft 9 in (1.75 m)

Career information
- College: Mapúa
- PBA draft: 2019: undrafted
- Playing career: 2018–present

Career history
- 2018–2019: Quezon City Capitals
- 2019–2021: Basilan Steel / Peace Riders
- 2022: Nueva Ecija Rice Vanguards
- 2023: NLEX Road Warriors
- 2024: Nueva Ecija Capitals
- 2024–2025: Pangasinan Heatwaves / Abono Reapers
- 2026–present: GenSan Warriors

Career highlights
- MPBL champion (2022); All-MPBL First Team (2022); 2× MPBL All-Star (2024, 2026); VisMin champion (2021 – 1st); 2× FilBasket champion (Subic 2021, Summer 2022)

Hesed Leo Jose Gabo (born March 21, 1992) is a Filipino professional basketball player for the GenSan Warriors of the Maharlika Pilipinas Basketball League (MPBL).

Gabo has won multiple championships in the grassroots level, including one in the MPBL, one in the Pilipinas VisMin Super Cup, and two in FilBasket. He also earned an All-MPBL First Team selection as well as an all-star selection.

He also had a stint with the NLEX Road Warriors of the Philippine Basketball Association (PBA).

== Amateur career ==
=== Quezon City Capitals (2018–2019) ===
The Mapúa product first began his amateur career with the Quezon City Capitals of the Maharlika Pilipinas Basketball League in its inaugural season. He stayed with Quezon City for one more season, averaging 11.3 points, 3.7 rebounds, and 7.0 assists in his second season with the team.

=== Basilan Steel (2019–2020) ===
In 2019, Gabo would move to the Basilan Steel. Despite scoring less, he still helped his team through their division finals run, averaging 7.7 points, 3.3 rebounds, and 7.6 assists. Mid-season, he would also declare for the 2019 PBA draft, but ended up getting undrafted.

== Professional career ==
=== Staying with Basilan (2021) ===
As the Basilan franchise moved to the Pilipinas VisMin Super Cup, so did Gabo, who has now entered the professional ranks for the first time. During the 1st Conference, he became a key player in Basilan's VisMin championship run, winning MVP honors during the Mindanao leg of the tournament. He also won the 2021 MPBL Invitational championship later that year.

In between, he also played for the AICC Manila team that won the inaugural FilBasket championship, itself composed of Basilan's core players.

=== Nueva Ecija Rice Vanguards franchise (2022) ===
In 2022, Gabo made the move to the Nueva Ecija Rice Vanguards franchise beginning with the 2022 FilBasket Summer Championship. With Nueva Ecija, Gabo won two more professional championships and was also selected to the All-MPBL First Team after averaging 7.1 points, 2.5 rebounds, and 5.8 assists.

=== NLEX Road Warriors (2023) ===
After five years in the grassroots level, Gabo would finally make his way to the Philippine Basketball Association. On January 17, 2023, he signed a one-year deal with the NLEX Road Warriors. Despite getting some playing time, Gabo wasn't able to contribute as much, only averaging 1.5 points per game in his first season with NLEX.

=== Return to Nueva Ecija (2024) ===
In January 2024, Gabo returned to the Nueva Ecija franchise midway through the 2023–24 Pilipinas Super League President's Cup.

=== Pangasinan Heatwaves (2024–2025) ===
Later that year, Gabo is one of many Rice Vanguards players who made the move to the expansion Pangasinan Heatwaves under his long-time coach, Jerson Cabiltes.

=== GenSan Warriors (2026–present) ===
In 2026, with the exit of the Pangasinan Heatwaves, Gabo joined the GenSan Warriors.

On July 29, 2026, Gabo became the first player in MPBL history to reach 1,000 career assists in their game against the Rizal Golden Coolers.

== Career statistics ==
=== PBA ===
Legend
GP	Games played	MPG	Minutes per game
FG%	Field-goal percentage	3P%	3-point field-goal percentage	FT%	Free-throw percentage
RPG	Rebounds per game	APG	Assists per game	SPG	Steals per game
BPG	Blocks per game	PPG	Points per game	**Bold**	Career high

As of the end of 2023–24 season

==== Season-by-season averages ====
Year	Team	GP	MPG	FG%	3P%	FT%	RPG	APG	SPG	BPG	PPG
2022–23	NLEX	**8**	**10.5**	**.250**	**.200**	**1.000**	**.3**	**1.1**	**.4**	—	**1.5**
2023–24	NLEX	2	9.3	.000	.000	—	—	1.0	—	—	—
Career		10	9.9	.125	.100	.500	.2	1.1	.2	.0	.8

=== MPBL ===
Legend
GP	Games played	GS	Games started	MPG	Minutes per game
FG%	Field-goal percentage	3P%	3-point field-goal percentage	FT%	Free-throw percentage
RPG	Rebounds per game	APG	Assists per game	SPG	Steals per game
BPG	Blocks per game	PPG	Points per game	**Bold**	Career high

As of the end of 2022 season

==== Season-by-season averages ====
Year	Team	GP	GS	MPG	FG%	3P%	FT%	RPG	APG	SPG	BPG	PPG
2018	Quezon City	12	12	29.5	**.464**	**.350**	.667	3.4	4.3	1.1	.1	9.8
2018–19	Quezon City	27	25	**29.2**	.424	.259	.593	**3.7**	7.0	**1.5**	**.2**	**11.3**
2019–20	Basilan	**36**	**30**	27.2	.381	.306	**.676**	3.3	**7.6**	.9	.1	7.7
2022	Nueva Ecija	31	17	20.0	.406	.346	**.676**	2.5	5.8	.8	—	7.1
