= MPBL finals =

Annual championship series of the Maharlika Pilipinas Basketball League

- Status: Active
- Genre: Sporting event
- Date: Late November – December (since 2022) (Note: Previously held in April (2018 and 2019) and March (2021).)
- Frequency: Annual
- Country: Philippines
- Inaugurated: 2018
- Most titles: Pampanga Giant Lanterns (2 titles)

The MPBL national finals or MPBL finals is the annual championship series of the Maharlika Pilipinas Basketball League (MPBL). The North and South Division champions compete in a best-of-five series to determine the league champion.

The MPBL finals is structured in a 2–2–1 format, where the first two games and, if necessary, the fifth and final game are hosted by the team with homecourt advantage, being the team with the better regular season record.

Five teams have won the MPBL finals with the Pampanga Giant Lanterns being the only team to win two titles, having won the most recent series in 2024. Since the introduction of divisions in the 2018–19 season, the North Division claimed four of the five titles.

== History ==
=== 2018–2021: Amateur era and Davao Occidental–San Juan rivalry ===
The first finals series was played in April 2018 between the Batangas City Athletics and Muntinlupa Cagers. Batangas City won the series, beating Muntinlupa in four games.

The 2019 and 2021 series mark the only back-to-back matchup between the same two teams to date: the Davao Occidental Tigers and San Juan Knights. The 2019 series is currently the only such to go the full five games with both teams alternating wins leading to a winner-take-all game 5. In the final minute of the game with the Davao Occidental Tigers leading by three, Jhonard Clarito made two crucial shots that lifted the San Juan Knights up by one point. San Juan would go on to win the championship.

Due to the COVID-19 pandemic, the 2020 series ended up being postponed to 2021. For safety measures, the entire 2021 series took place at the MPBL's bubble at the Subic Bay Gymnasium. Davao Occidental and San Juan met once again, but this time with the Tigers getting their revenge, beating San Juan in four games. In a similar fashion to the previous series, Mark Yee helped clinch the title with a three-pointer in the final moments of game 4, removing a two-point San Juan lead.

=== 2022–present: Central Luzon dominance ===
As the league gained professional status, the next three final series would feature dominance from Central Luzon-based teams. In the 2022 series, the Nueva Ecija Rice Vanguards came off a 21–0 regular season and beat the Zamboanga Family's Brand Sardines in four games while the following 2023 series saw the first-ever national finals sweep, with the Pampanga Giant Lanterns defeating the Bacoor City Strikers in three games. In the succeeding 2024 finals, Pampanga would make their way back to the finals, this time against the Quezon Huskers. The first two games of the series were played in international grounds for the first time in national finals history, having taken place at the Rashid Bin Hamdan Indoor Hall in Dubai, United Arab Emirates. Pampanga once against swept their opponents to become the first team in the league to win two championships and to do so in back-to-back seasons.

== Team records ==
=== Appearances ===
Team	No.	W	L	PCT	Most recent appearance	Most recent title	Notes
Pampanga Giant Lanterns	2	2	0	1.000	2024	2024	In 2024, Pampanga became the first team to win two championships.
San Juan Knights	2	1	1	.500	2021	2019	In 2019, San Juan became the first non-first seed to win a championship.
Davao Occidental Tigers	2	1	1	.500	2021	2021	Team did not participate in 2022 and 2023.
Batangas City Tanduay Rum Masters	1	1	0	1.000	2018	2018	
Nueva Ecija Rice Vanguards	1	1	0	1.000	2022	2022	
Abra Weavers	1	1	0	1.000	2025	2025	
Quezon Huskers	2	0	2	.000	2025	—	
Muntinlupa Cagers	1	0	1	.000	2018	—	
Zamboanga Master Sardines	1	0	1	.000	2022	—	
Bacoor City Strikers	1	0	1	.000	2023	—	Team departed after the 2023 season.

=== Games ===
Team	GP	W	L	PCT	Notes
Davao Occidental Tigers	9	5	4	.556	Won 3–1 in their last national finals appearance in 2021.
San Juan Knights	9	4	5	.444	Lost 1–3 in their last national finals appearance in 2021.
Pampanga Giant Lanterns	6	6	0	1.000	In 2023, Pampanga recorded the first national finals sweep in league history; won 3–0 in their last national finals appearance in 2024.
Abra Weavers	3	3	0	1.000	Won 3–0 in their last national finals appearance in 2025.
Batangas City Tanduay Rum Masters	4	3	1	.750	Won 3–1 in their last national finals appearance in 2018.
Nueva Ecija Rice Vanguards	4	3	1	.750	Won 3–1 in their last national finals appearance in 2022.
Muntinlupa Cagers	4	1	3	.250	Lost 1–3 in their last national finals appearance in 2018.
Zamboanga Master Sardines	4	1	3	.250	Lost 1–3 in their last national finals appearance in 2022.
Bacoor City Strikers	3	0	3	.000	Lost 0–3 in their last national finals appearance in 2023. Team departed after the 2023 season.
Quezon Huskers	6	0	6	.000	Lost 0–3 in their last national finals appearance in 2025.
