= Nueva Ecija Rice Vanguards–San Juan Knights rivalry =

Filipino basketball rivalry

- Teams: Nueva Ecija Rice Vanguards; San Juan Knights
- First meeting: August 12, 2019 (MPBL); San Juan 109, Nueva Ecija 95
- Latest meeting: May 17, 2025 (MPBL); Nueva Ecija 97, San Juan 86

Statistics
- Total meetings: 17
- All-time series: 10–7 (Nueva Ecija)
- Longest win streak: Nueva Ecija / San Juan W3
- Current win streak: Nueva Ecija W1

Postseason history
- 2022 FilBasket Summer Championship finals: Nueva Ecija won, 2–1; 2022 MPBL North Division finals: Nueva Ecija won, 2–1; 2023 MPBL North Division semifinals: San Juan won, 2–0; 2024 Pilipinas Super League semifinals: Nueva Ecija won, 2–0

The Nueva Ecija Rice Vanguards and San Juan Knights first met in 2019 in the Maharlika Pilipinas Basketball League, but the rivalry began getting fierce as both teams became contenders. Following their title clash in the 2022 FilBasket Summer Championship, both teams have fought for North Division contention in the MPBL, playing each other in back-to-back playoff series (2022 and 2023).

== History ==
=== 2019: First meeting ===
The first meeting between the two teams happened in the Maharlika Pilipinas Basketball League's 2019–20 season. The defending champion San Juan Knights hosted the expansion Nueva Ecija Rice Vanguards on August 12, 2019, at the Filoil Flying V Centre. San Juan would win the game 109–95.

=== 2021–present: Contenders ===
==== Fighting for contention ====
In the draw for the 2021 MPBL Invitational, the Nueva Ecija Rice Vanguards were then drawn into Group C with the San Juan Knights, setting up the next meeting between both teams. On December 19, 2021, the two would clash once again as Nueva Ecija prevented San Juan's group stage sweep with a 88–85 victory over the Knights. Nueva Ecija would beat Imus in their next game to sweep the group and clinch first place in Group C. While the Rice Vanguards reached the finals, the Knights were eliminated in the quarterfinals.

The team's battle for contention continued as both teams entered FilBasket for the 2022 Summer Championship. Nueva Ecija, competing as the Capitals, would win the head-to-head match-up in overtime, 95–92. Both teams made the playoffs and went all the way to the finals for their first playoff meeting. In the best-of-three series, Nueva Ecija won game 1 while San Juan won game 2. In the winner-takes-all game 3, the game became close as the fourth quarter went on and eventually bringing the game into overtime. In the end, Nueva Ecija would win the game and the championship with a score of 90–88.

==== The rivalry intensifies ====
Returning to the MPBL for the 2022 season, both teams continued to show their winning prowess. Nueva Ecija showed their dominance all-season with an undefeated 21–0 record while San Juan settled for a 14–7 record. Both teams would meet in the North Division Finals. In game 1, the Knights gave the Rice Vanguards their first loss of the entire season in a 79–72 win. Nueva Ecija would win in overtime in the succeeding game 2 as they returned home to win the series in game 3. Nueva Ecija would go on to win their first championship. They would meet in the playoffs again in the following season, Nueva Ecija and San Juan were once again fighting for North Division contention, with both teams finishing with 23–5 and 19–9 records, respectively. Despite Nueva Ecija winning the regular season match-up, San Juan would sweep Nueva Ecija in the Division Semifinals to advance to their fourth straight Division Finals series.

San Juan and Nueva Ecija met again in the Pilipinas Super League's President's Cup. In the final game of the elimination round, San Juan would beat Nueva Ecija on March 16, 2024, with a score of 86–83. The win would lead to San Juan clinching the second seed in the playoffs via head-to-head victory over Nueva Ecija. The two teams would meet again in the semifinals for their fourth playoff meeting. Nueva Ecija would sweep the best-of-three series on their way to a finals matchup against the Quezon Titans. During the free agency window of the 2024 MPBL season in June, John Wilson, who won the MPBL Most Valuable Player award with SJK, joined Nueva Ecija after being released by the South Cotabato Warriors.

== Annual finishes ==
NOTE: Preseason games are not included.

League	Season	Nueva Ecija Rice Vanguards/Capitals				San Juan Knights/Kings				Series
League	Season	W	L	PCT	Playoff finish	W	L	PCT	Playoff finish	Series
MPBL	2019–20	10	20	.333	Did not qualify	26	4	.867	Lost National Finals	SJ 1–0
FilBasket	Summer 2022	10	1	.909	Won Finals	6	5	.545	Lost Finals	NE 3–1
MPBL	2022	21	0	1.000	Won National Finals	14	7	.667	Lost Division Finals	NE 3–1
MPBL	2023	23	5	.821	Lost Division Semifinals	19	9	.679	Lost Division Finals	SJ 2–1
PSL	2023–24	16	2	.889	Lost Finals	16	2	.889	Lost Semifinals	NE 2–1
MPBL	2024	24	4	.857	Lost Division Semifinals	26	2	.929	Lost Division Finals	SJ 1–0
MPBL	2025	27	2	.931	Lost Division Quarterfinals	26	3	.897	Lost Division Semifinals	NE 1–0

== Game summaries ==
Legend
Nueva Ecija win
San Juan win
**Bold** indicates home team

League	Type	Date	Winning team	Score	Losing team	Location	Recap
MPBL	Regular season	August 12, 2019	**San Juan**	109–95	Nueva Ecija	Filoil Flying V Centre	Recap
FilBasket	Regular season	April 20, 2022	Nueva Ecija	95–92	San Juan	San Jose del Monte Sports Complex	Recap
FilBasket	Playoffs	May 4, 2022	Nueva Ecija	77–61	San Juan	Muntinlupa Sports Center	Recap
FilBasket	Playoffs	May 6, 2022	San Juan	71–65	Nueva Ecija	Muntinlupa Sports Center	Recap
FilBasket	Playoffs	May 8, 2022	Nueva Ecija	90–88	San Juan	Muntinlupa Sports Center	Recap
MPBL	Regular season	July 12, 2022	**Nueva Ecija**	81–75	San Juan	Nueva Ecija Coliseum	Recap
MPBL	Playoffs	November 18, 2022	San Juan	79–72	**Nueva Ecija**	Nueva Ecija Coliseum	Recap
MPBL	Playoffs	November 21, 2022	Nueva Ecija	89–83	**San Juan**	Filoil EcoOil Centre	Recap
MPBL	Playoffs	November 25, 2022	**Nueva Ecija**	84–68	San Juan	Nueva Ecija Coliseum	Recap
MPBL	Regular season	September 21, 2023	**Nueva Ecija**	99–97	San Juan	Nueva Ecija Coliseum	Recap
MPBL	Playoffs	October 27, 2023	San Juan	86–82	Nueva Ecija	Bren Z. Guiao Convention Center	Recap
MPBL	Playoffs	November 3, 2023	San Juan	88–80	**Nueva Ecija**	Nueva Ecija Coliseum	Recap
PSL	Regular season	March 16, 2024	**San Juan**	83–73	Nueva Ecija	Filoil EcoOil Centre	Recap
PSL	Playoffs	April 2, 2024	Nueva Ecija	95–86	San Juan	Alonte Sports Arena	Recap
PSL	Playoffs	April 4, 2024	Nueva Ecija	86–83	**San Juan**	Filoil EcoOil Centre	Recap
MPBL	Regular season	July 5, 2024	**San Juan**	78–66	Nueva Ecija	Filoil EcoOil Centre	Recap
MPBL	Regular season	May 17, 2025	**Nueva Ecija**	97–86	San Juan	Nueva Ecija Colliseum	Recap

== See also ==
- Nueva Ecija Rice Vanguards–Pampanga Giant Lanterns rivalry
- Pampanga Giant Lanterns–San Juan Knights rivalry
