= Pangasinan Heatwaves =

Professional basketball team in Pangasinan, Philippines

- League: MPBL
- Founded: February 7, 2024; 2 years ago
- History: Pangasinan Heatwaves (2024–2025) (MPBL); Pangasinan Abono Reapers (2024-2025) (PSL)
- Arena: Calasiao Sports Complex; Robert B. Estrella Sr. Memorial Stadium
- Location: Calasiao, Pangasinan
- Team colors

The Pangasinan Heatwaves were a Philippine professional basketball team based in the province of Pangasinan. The team last competed in the Maharlika Pilipinas Basketball League (MPBL). The team last played their home games at Robert B. Estrella Sr. Memorial Stadium in Rosales.

The team began play in the 2024 MPBL season as part of the league's Northern Luzon expansion. They also compete in the Pilipinas Super League under the name Pangasinan Abono Reapers.

== History ==
=== Background and founding ===
The province of Pangasinan has previously been involved in professional basketball in the country. For three seasons, the Pangasinan Presidents in 1998 to 1999 season, and changed its club name to Pangasinan Waves in 1999 & 2002 season in the Metropolitan Basketball Association. The province also hosted the PBA All-Star Weekend in 2019, which was held at the Calasiao Sports Complex.

The team was first announced on January 17, 2024, when Alaminos mayor Bryan Celeste posted a tryout for the Pangasinan-based team. On February 7, 2024, the team formally signed as expansion team and was initially named the Pangasinan Heat. They are one of two expansion teams admitted for the MPBL's 2024 season, the other being the Abra Weavers. Former Bayambang mayor Cezar Quiambao was named as team owner. Jerson Cabiltes took on the role of head coach for their inaugural season coming off a two-year stint with the Nueva Ecija Rice Vanguards franchise. Cabiltes' presence also brought in players from the Rice Vanguards, such as Hesed Gabo and Michael Mabulac to go alongside ex-PBA cagers Ed Daquioag and Dennice Villamor.

=== First season ===
Their first game was played on April 6, 2024, as part of the season's opening gameday. In their inaugural game, the Heatwaves lost at home in an expansion battle against the Abra Weavers. Their first franchise win came on April 17 against the Bulacan Kuyas at Paco Arena while their first home win was achieved on April 27 against the Marikina Shoemasters.

== Team identity ==
According to Quiambao, the name references the province's solar power supply and its aim to become the country's "Solar Capital".

== Home venues ==
In 2024, the Heatwaves played all of their home games at the Calasiao Sports Complex in Calasiao, including that season's opening day. In 2025, the team began playing at Robert B. Estrella Sr. Memorial Stadium in Rosales.

Venue	Location	Capacity	2024	2025
Calasiao Sports Complex	Calasiao, Pangasinan	3,000	✓	✓
Robert B. Estrella Sr. Memorial Stadium	Rosales, Pangasinan	N/A	✗	✓

== Personnel ==
=== 2025 roster ===
Pangasinan Heatwaves roster
Players

Pos.	No.	Name	Height	Weight	DOB	From
G/F	1	Harvey Pagsanjan				Emilio Aguinaldo
F	3	Jay-R Taganas	6 ft 3 in (1.91 m)	191 lb (87 kg)	1987–09–01	San Beda
G/F	5	Vince Tolentino	6 ft 3 in (1.91 m)		1993–08–27	Ateneo
G	6	Ian Melencio	5 ft 8 in (1.73 m)		1989–05–11	AIMS
G	7	Joshua Fontanilla	5 ft 10 in (1.78 m)			UST
F	8	Raymond Capin
G	10	Ralph Robin	5 ft 10 in (1.78 m)			Emilio Aguinaldo
G	11	Mac Tallo	6 ft 0 in (1.83 m)	187 lb (85 kg)	1994–01–02	Southwestern
	13	JR Cassi (HG)
F	15	Jorey Napoles	6 ft 4 in (1.93 m)		1993–11–27	TIP
	17	Jerald Bautista
F	19	Nat Cosejo	6 ft 3 in (1.91 m)			Emilio Aguinaldo
G/F	20	FJ Dylim
F/C	23	Jay Collado	6 ft 4 in (1.93 m)			LSB
F/C	28	Michael Mabulac	6 ft 4 in (1.93 m)	218 lb (99 kg)	1991–10–31	José Rizal
F	29	Michael Juico	6 ft 0 in (1.83 m)	140 lb (64 kg)	1989–09–24	San Sebastian
F	33	King Gurtiza				Emilio Aguinaldo
F	36	Arth Bryan Celeste
G/F	54	Bong Galanza	6 ft 2 in (1.88 m)	185 lb (84 kg)	1992-12-21	UE
G	—	Michael DiGregorio	6 ft 1 in (1.85 m)	180 lb (82 kg)	1991–12–12	McKendree
F	—	Lervin Flores	6 ft 5 in (1.96 m)	185 lb (84 kg)	1992–09–26	Arellano

Coaches

Head coach

- Jerson Cabiltes

Assistant coach(es)

- Noy Catalan
- Jun Marzan
- Joseph Guion
- Harold Ng
- Ariel Sison
- Jun Medina
- Bong Pineda

Team consultant

- Marlou Aquino

Legend

- (HG) Homegrown
- (FF) Filipino-foreigner
- (SGL) Special Guest Licensee
- (RS) Reserve player
- Injured

- Roster via Genius Sports
Updated as of: March 4, 2025

=== Head coaches ===
Pangasinan Heatwaves head coaches
#	Name	Start	End	Achievements	Ref.
1	Jerson Cabiltes	2024	2025	—	

== Notable players ==
=== MPBL All-Star Day ===
All-Star selections

- Hesed Gabo – 2024
- Michael Juico – 2024

=== PBA players ===
Ex-PBA players

- Mac Baracael
- Michael DiGregorio (returned to PBA)
- Hesed Gabo
- Bong Galanza
- Michael Juico
- Michael Mabulac
- Jay-R Taganas
- Mac Tallo
- Dennice Villamor

== Season-by-season records ==
League champions
Division champions
Qualified for playoffs
Best regular season record

=== Maharlika Pilipinas Basketball League ===
Season	Regular season							Playoffs	
Season	Division	Finish	GP	W	L	PCT	GB	Stage	Results
Pangasinan Heatwaves
2024	North	11th	28	12	16	.429	14	Did not qualify	
2025	North	7th	29	20	9	.690	8	Division quarterfinals Division semifinals Division finals	won vs. Nueva Ecija, 2–1 won vs. San Juan, 2–1 lost vs. Abra, 0–3
Did not participate from 2026
All-time regular season record			57	32	25	.561		1 playoff appearances	
All-time playoff record			9	4	5	.444		0 finals appearances	
All-time overall record			66	36	30	.545		0 championships	

=== Pilipinas Super League ===
Season	Regular season						Playoffs	
Season	Finish	GP	W	L	PCT	GB	Stage	Results
Pangasinan Abono Reapers
2024–25; President's Cup	4th	10	8	2	.800	1	Quarterfinals 1 Quarterfinals 2 Semifinals	won vs. Pureblends, 1–0 won vs. Biñan, 1–0 lost vs. Caloocan, 1–2
All-time regular season record		10	8	2	.800		1 playoff appearance	
All-time playoff record		5	3	2	.600		0 finals appearances	
All-time overall record		15	11	4	.733		0 championships	
