= Michael Mabulac =

Filipino basketball player (born 1991)

No. 28 – Biñan Tatak Gel
- Position: Power forward / Center
- League: MPBL

Personal information
- Born: October 31, 1991 (age 35) Makati, Philippines
- Listed height: 6 ft 4 in (1.93 m)
- Listed weight: 218 lb (99 kg)

Career information
- College: JRU
- PBA draft: 2015: 3rd round, 32nd overall pick
- Drafted by: San Miguel Beermen
- Playing career: 2015–present

Career history
- 2015–2018: San Miguel Beermen
- 2018–2019: Laguna Heroes
- 2019–2020: Bacoor City Strikers
- 2021: Basilan Peace Riders
- 2021–2024: Nueva Ecija Rice Vanguards / Capitals
- 2024–2025: Pangasinan Heatwaves / Abono Reapers
- 2026–present: Biñan Tatak Gel

Career highlights
- 3× PBA champion (2015–16 Philippine, 2016–17 Philippine, 2017 Commissioner's); MPBL champion (2022); All-MPBL Second Team (2019); 2× MPBL All-Star (2019, 2022); PSL Mythical Five (2025); VisMin champion (2021 – 1st); VisMin Finals MVP (2021 – 1st); FilBasket champion (Summer 2022)

Michael Mabulac (born October 31, 1991) is a Filipino professional basketball player for the Biñan Tatak Gel of the Maharlika Pilipinas Basketball League (MPBL).

After playing for the JRU Heavy Bombers and multiple teams in the PBA D-League, Mabulac was drafted 32nd overall by the San Miguel Beermen of the Philippine Basketball Association (PBA), but didn't get significant playing time. In 2018, he moved to the MPBL and played with the Laguna Heroes and Bacoor City Strikers before going back to the professional ranks with the Basilan Peace Riders of the Pilipinas VisMin Super Cup in 2021. Later that year, he joined the Nueva Ecija Rice Vanguards franchise and stayed there until 2024 when we moved to the expansion Pangasinan Heatwaves.

Across all leagues, Mabulac has won six professional championships (three in the PBA, and one each in the MPBL, VisMin, and FilBasket) as well as a Finals MVP nod in VisMin. He also has two MPBL all-star selections as well as an All-MPBL Second Team selection.

== Career statistics ==
=== PBA ===
Legend
GP	Games played	MPG	Minutes per game
FG%	Field-goal percentage	3P%	3-point field-goal percentage	FT%	Free-throw percentage
RPG	Rebounds per game	APG	Assists per game	SPG	Steals per game
BPG	Blocks per game	PPG	Points per game	**Bold**	Career high

==== Season-by-season averages ====
Year	Team	GP	MPG	FG%	3P%	FT%	RPG	APG	SPG	BPG	PPG
2015–16	San Miguel	**7**	1.7	**.429**	.000	**.500**	**0.3**	—	—	—	**1.0**
2016–17	San Miguel	2	**1.9**	.000	.000	.000	—	—	—	—	—
2017–18	San Miguel	1	.7	.000	.000	.000	—	—	—	—	—

=== MPBL ===
Legend
GP	Games played	GS	Games started	MPG	Minutes per game
FG%	Field-goal percentage	3P%	3-point field-goal percentage	FT%	Free-throw percentage
RPG	Rebounds per game	APG	Assists per game	SPG	Steals per game
BPG	Blocks per game	PPG	Points per game	**Bold**	Career high

==== Season-by-season averages ====
Year	Team	GP	GS	MPG	FG%	3P%	FT%	RPG	APG	SPG	BPG	PPG
2018–19	Laguna	25	22	**27.9**	.444	.000	.527	**11.3**	1.3	**1.0**	**1.5**	**14.3**
2019–20	Bacoor City	**31**	**23**	21.7	.496	**1.000**	**.589**	8.5	2.1	.5	.4	9.7
2022	Nueva Ecija	30	**23**	22.6	**.553**	.000	.528	7.1	**2.2**	.9	.2	11.4
2023	Nueva Ecija	26	15	19.4	.461	.000	.514	6.1	**2.2**	.8	.4	8.4
2024	Pangasinan Heatwaves	26	13	20.7	.489	.000	.549	7	**1.7**	.8	.5	8.7
2025	Pangasinan Heatwaves	35	28	19.7	.539	.000	.539	7.9	**1.9**	1.1	.1	8.7
