= MPBL finals Most Valuable Player award =

Annual Maharlika Pilipinas Basketball League award

The MPBL finals Most Valuable Player award is an annual Maharlika Pilipinas Basketball League award given to the best player of each season's national finals series. It was first awarded after the 2018 MPBL finals, making it the league's oldest award and the only one that is given out in every season since its establishment.

As of 2025, six players have won the award with the most recent recipient Abra's Jason Brickman, Justine Baltazar (formerly of Pampanga), being the only winner of multiple Finals MVPs and to do so in back-to-back finals. Baltazar is also the only recipient to have also won Most Valuable Player while Mark Yee is the only recipient who has also won Defensive Player of the Year.

== Winners ==
| ^ | Denotes player who is still active in the MPBL |
| † | Denotes player who is still active outside of the MPBL |
| Player (#) | Denotes the number of times the player had been named MVP at that time |
| Team (#) | Denotes the number of times a player from this team had won at that time |

| Year | Player | Pos. | Team | Ref. |
|---|---|---|---|---|
| 2018 | Val Acuña^ | G | Batangas City Athletics | |
| 2019 | Mike Ayonayon^ | G | San Juan Knights | |
| 2021 | Mark Yee^ | F | Davao Occidental Tigers | |
| 2022 | Byron Villarias^ | G | Nueva Ecija Rice Vanguards | |
| 2023 | Justine Baltazar^{†} | F/C | Pampanga Giant Lanterns | |
| 2024 | Justine Baltazar^{†} (2) | F/C | Pampanga Giant Lanterns (2) | |
| 2025 | Jason Brickman ^{†} | G | Abra Solid North Weavers | |
