= Jonathan Uyloan =

Filipino-American basketball player

Personal information
- Born: November 26, 1983 (age 42)
- Listed height: 6 ft 0 in (1.83 m)
- Listed weight: 185 lb (84 kg)

Career information
- College: Golden West College
- PBA draft: 2009: Undrafted
- Playing career: 2010–present
- Position: Point guard / shooting guard

Career history
- 2010–2015: Rain or Shine Elasto Painters
- 2015–2016: GlobalPort Batang Pier
- 2016–2017: Meralco Bolts
- 2018: NLEX Road Warriors
- 2019–2021: Basilan Steel / Peace Riders / Jumbo Plastic
- 2022–2025: Nueva Ecija Capitals / Rice Vanguards

Career highlights
- PBA champion (2012 Governors'); 2× MPBL champion (2021, 2022)

Jonathan Uyloan (born November 26, 1983) is a Filipino-American professional basketball player who last played for the Nueva Ecija Rice Vanguards of the Maharlika Pilipinas Basketball League (MPBL). He was undrafted and signed by the Rain or Shine Elasto Painters in 2010.

== PBA career statistics ==
Legend
GP	Games played	MPG	Minutes per game
FG%	Field-goal percentage	3P%	3-point field-goal percentage	FT%	Free-throw percentage
RPG	Rebounds per game	APG	Assists per game	SPG	Steals per game
BPG	Blocks per game	PPG	Points per game	**Bold**	Career high

Correct as of October 19, 2016

=== Season-by-season averages ===
Year	Team	GP	MPG	FG%	3P%	FT%	RPG	APG	SPG	BPG	PPG
2010–11	Rain or Shine	9	5.1	.105	.125	.000	1.0	.8	.0	.1	.5
2011–12	Rain or Shine	8	5.0	**.533**	**.375**	**1.000**	.8	1.3	.5	.0	2.6
2012–13	Rain or Shine	16	8.8	.410	**.375**	.579	1.6	.8	.6	.2	3.1
2013–14	Rain or Shine	21	9.4	.443	**.375**	.538	1.5	1.2	**1.3**	**.3**	3.3
2014–15	Rain or Shine	**52**	**17.8**	.371	.323	.652	**2.2**	**2.1**	1.1	.2	**5.1**
2015–16	GlobalPort / Meralco	41	12.3	.329	.354	.500	1.2	1.0	.7	.2	3.4
Career		147	12.6	.366	.336	.600	1.6	1.4	.9	.2	3.7
