= Nueva Ecija Rice Vanguards =

Professional basketball team in Nueva Ecija, Philippines

- League: MPBL (2019–2025); FilBasket (2022); PSL (2023–2024)
- Founded: 2019; 7 years ago
- History: Nueva Ecija MiGuard; 2019; Nueva Ecija ForestLake; 2019; Nueva Ecija Rice Vanguards; 2019–2025 (MPBL); Nueva Ecija Capitals; 2022 (FilBasket); 2023–2024 (PSL)
- Arena: Nueva Ecija Coliseum
- Location: Nueva Ecija
- Team colors
- Championships: MPBL: 1 (2022); FilBasket: 1 (Summer 2022)
- Conference titles: MPBL: 1 (2022)

The Nueva Ecija Rice Vanguards (shortened as NERV) were a Philippine professional basketball team based in Palayan, Nueva Ecija. The team last competed in the Maharlika Pilipinas Basketball League (MPBL). The team played its home games at Nueva Ecija Coliseum.

The team began play as an expansion team for the 2019–20 MPBL season, though they would only begin using the Rice Vanguards moniker later on. The team also plays in the Pilipinas Super League under the name Nueva Ecija Capitals. The team also competed in FilBasket as well as in the Chooks-to-Go Pilipinas 3x3.

The Nueva Ecija franchise is the holder of the only regular season sweep in the MPBL, recording 21 wins with no losses during the 2022 MPBL season, where they would go on to win their first MPBL championship.

== History ==
=== 2019–2020: First MPBL season ===
In May 2019, Nueva Ecija formally joined the Maharlika Pilipinas Basketball League as an expansion team for the league's 2019–20 season. Alvin Grey was the team's first head coach before being replaced by Charles Tiu mid-season. Nueva Ecija finished 11th in the North with a 10–20 record.

=== 2022–2026 ===
In the lead-up to the 2022 season, Nueva Ecija took part in the 2021 Invitational. After sweeping Group C, the Rice Vanguards reached the finals against Basilan Jumbo Plastic, but lost due to Philip Manalang's championship-winning buzzer beater in overtime, thus settling for the runner-up spot. The team would later take part in FilBasket's 2022 Summer Championship. Competing as the Nueva Ecija Capitals, they finished the elimination round with a 10–1 record and made the finals against the San Juan Knights as the series went into three games. The Capitals won the final game in overtime to clinch their first ever league championship, making way for a rivalry with the San Juan franchise.

==== Regular season sweep ====
With additions such as Hesed Gabo, Will McAloney, and Michael Mabulac, together with their new head coach in Jerson Cabiltes, Nueva Ecija then dominated the 2022 MPBL season with the league's first-ever regular season sweep, winning all 21 games. Mabulac was declared an all-star together with Bobby Balucanag, while Gabo and McAloney were both part of the All-MPBL First Team that season. The Rice Vanguards then swept the first two rounds of the playoffs against Marikina and intraregional rivals Pampanga. A challenge then rose for the team in the North Division finals against the defending division champion San Juan Knights, as they would lose game 1 of the series. The Rice Vanguards fought back and won game 2 in overtime before ultimately defeating the Knights in game 3. In the 2022 finals, Nueva Ecija met the Marcelino-led Zamboanga Family's Brand Sardines. The Rice Vanguards won the first two games at home but lost game 3 as the visiting team. The team then went on to win game 4 to bring Nueva Ecija and Central Luzon its first-ever MPBL championship. The Finals MVP was awarded to Byron Villarias.

Despite Gabo moving to the Philippine Basketball Association, signing with the NLEX Road Warriors during the off-season, Nueva Ecija kept most of its key players for the 2023 season. The team continued to win in the regular season, starting with an 11–0 record, but would suffer its first regular season loss since 2020 against the Viernes-led Sarangani Marlins. Nueva Ecija still proved to be contenders in 2023, finishing 2nd with a 23–5 record. After eliminating Pasay in the first round, the Rice Vanguards once again met with the San Juan Knights. This time around, San Juan ended up sweeping the rematch, ending Nueva Ecija's repeat hopes.

During the 2023–24 MPBL off-season, the team took part in the Pilipinas Super League as part of its 2023–24 President's Cup, where they once again competed under the Capitals moniker. During which, Jerson Cabiltes parted ways with the franchise as he would later become the head coach of expansion side Pangasinan Heatwaves. Don Dulay, who won an MPBL title with the Davao Occidental Tigers, took on the head coaching job for the rest of the President's Cup and for the 2024 MPBL season.

=== Departure from the MPBL ===
However by the end of 2025, Rice Vanguards released all of its players and members of the coaching staff. In January 2026, they announced they are filing a leave on absence effectively departing from the MPBL.

== Rivalries ==
=== San Juan Knights ===
Both Nueva Ecija and the San Juan Knights have become constant contenders across the multiple leagues they have taken part in. It began in FilBasket when both teams met in the finals of the 2022 Summer Championship and later fought for North Division contention in the MPBL, with both teams meeting in the playoffs in 2022 and 2023. Across all leagues, both teams have met each other twelve times.

== Home venues ==
The Nueva Ecija franchise has always played their home games at Nueva Ecija Coliseum in Palayan. The only season in which the team did not play at home was during their inaugural season.

Venue	Location	2019–20	2022	2023	2024	2025
Nueva Ecija Coliseum	Palayan, Nueva Ecija	✗	✓	✓	✓	✓

== Current roster ==
Nueva Ecija Rice Vanguards roster
Players

Pos.	No.	Name	Height	Weight	DOB	From
F	1	Jonathan Uyloan	6 ft 0 in (1.83 m)	185 lb (84 kg)	1983–11–26	Golden West
G	4	Ryan Costelo	5 ft 6 in (1.68 m)			San Sebastian
G	10	Don-Don Arenas (HG)	5 ft 10 in (1.78 m)			Gloria Lacson
G	13	Kenneth Mocon	5 ft 10 in (1.78 m)	185 lb (84 kg)	1993–10–13	San Beda
F	15	Bobby Balucanag (HG)	6 ft 0 in (1.83 m)			San Sebastian
G		John Wilson	6 ft 2 in (1.88 m)	185 lb (84 kg)	1987–01–18	José Rizal
F	21	Chester Saldua	6 ft 5 in (1.96 m)		1994–05–19	Philippine Christian
G	24	JC Cullar	5 ft 10 in (1.78 m)			St. Benilde
G/F	25	Jesper Ayaay	6 ft 3 in (1.91 m)			Lyceum
F	26	Billy Robles	6 ft 0 in (1.83 m)	175 lb (79 kg)	1992–05–30	NIPSC
F	31	Jeff Javillonar	6 ft 3 in (1.91 m)		1993–01–01	National-U
F	77	Clark Derige (HG)	6 ft 3 in (1.91 m)	220 lb (100 kg)		UE
G/F	—	Tyron Chan	6 ft 2 in (1.88 m)			Centro Escolar
F	—	Jammer Jamito	6 ft 5 in (1.96 m)	170 lb (77 kg)	1990–09–01	St. Clare
	—	Christian Manaytay	6 ft 5 in (1.96 m)			UST
G	—	Jaycee Marcelino	5 ft 9 in (1.75 m)		1995–10–19	Lyceum
G	—	Jayvee Marcelino	5 ft 9 in (1.75 m)			Lyceum
G	—	Dexter Maiquez	6 ft 3 in (1.91 m)	220 lb (100 kg)	1991-06-09
F	—	Ralph Tansingco	6 ft 4 in (1.93 m)			Lyceum

Coaches

Head coach

- Don Dulay

Assistant coach(es)

- Rob Wainwright
- Matt Makalintal
- Arnold Oliveros
- Jonathan Uyloan
- Ric Sison

Team manager

- Ivan Cuevas

Legend

- (HG) Homegrown
- (FF) Filipino-foreigner
- (SGL) Special Guest Licensee
- (RS) Reserve player
- Injured

- Roster – via Genius Sports
Updated as of: March 8, 2025

=== Head coaches ===
Nueva Ecija Rice Vanguards head coaches
#	Name	Start	End	Achievements	Ref.
1	Eric Gascon	2019	2019	—	
2	Alvin Grey	2019	2019	—	
3	Charles Tiu	2019	2020	—	
4	Carlo Tan	2021	2021	—	
5	Jerson Cabiltes	2022	2023	MPBL Coach of the Year (2022)	
6	Don Dulay	2024	2025	—	

== Notable players ==
=== Individual award winners ===
MPBL finals Most Valuable Player

- Byron Villarias – 2022

All-MPBL First Team

- Will McAloney – 2022, 2023, 2024
- Hesed Gabo – 2022

All-MPBL Second Team

- Robby Celiz – 2024
- Jaycee Marcelino – 2025

=== MPBL All-Star Day ===
All-Star selections

- Jai Reyes – 2020
- Bobby Balucanag – 2022
- Michael Mabulac – 2022
- Will McAloney – 2023, 2024
- Roi Sumang – 2023
- Robby Celiz – 2024
- Jaycee Marcelino – 2025

All-Star Game head coaches

- Jerson Cabiltes – 2022

=== PBA players ===
Ex-PBA players

- Jimbo Aquino
- Anthony Bringas
- JR Cawaling
- Robby Celiz
- Hesed Gabo
- Jerwin Gaco
- Michael Juico
- Michael Mabulac
- Will McAloney
- Renz Palma
- Pamboy Raymundo
- Jai Reyes
- Billy Robles
- Roi Sumang
- Byron Villarias
- John Wilson

Drafted to PBA

- Kemark Cariño – 13th overall, season 48
- Christian Manaytay – 10th overall, season 50

== Season-by-season records ==
League champions
Division champions
Qualified for playoffs
Best regular season record

=== Maharlika Pilipinas Basketball League ===
Season	Regular season							Playoffs	
Season	Division	Finish	GP	W	L	PCT	GB	Stage	Results
Nueva Ecija Rice Vanguards
2019–20; Lakan Season	North	11th	30	10	20	.333	16	Did not qualify	
2022	North	1st	21	21	0	1.000	—	Division quarterfinals Division semifinals Division finals National finals	won vs. Marikina, 2–0 won vs. Pampanga, 2–0 won vs. San Juan, 2–1 won vs. Zamboanga, 3–1
2023	North	2nd	28	23	5	.821	3	Division quarterfinals Division semifinals	won vs. Pasay, 2–0 lost vs. San Juan, 0–2
2024	North	3rd	28	24	4	.857	2	Division quarterfinals Division semifinals	won vs. Pasay, 2–0 lost vs. Pampanga, 0–2
2025	North	2nd	29	27	2	.931	1	Division quarterfinals	lost vs. Pangasinan, 1–2
Did not participate from 2026
All-time regular season record			136	105	31	.772		4 playoff appearances	
All-time playoff record			22	14	8	.636		1 finals appearance	
All-time overall record			158	119	39	.753		1 championship	

=== Pilipinas Super League ===
Tournament	Elimination round						Playoffs	
Tournament	Finish	GP	W	L	PCT	GB	Stage	Results
Nueva Ecija Capitals
2023–24; President's Cup	3rd	18	16	2	.889	1	First round Quarterfinals; Semifinals; Finals	won vs. Manila, 1–0 won vs. Davao Occidental, 1–1 won vs. San Juan, 2–0 lost vs. Quezon, 1–3
All-time elimination round record		18	16	2	.889		1 playoff appearances	
All-time playoff record		9	5	4	.556		1 finals appearances	
All-time overall record		27	21	6	.778		0 championships	
