= Bong Galanza =

Filipino basketball player

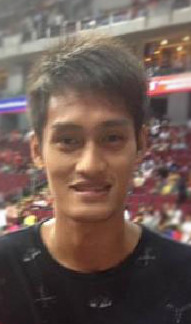
- Galanza in 2015

Personal information
- Born: December 21, 1992 (age 33) Isabela, Philippines
- Listed height: 6 ft 2 in (1.88 m)
- Listed weight: 185 lb (84 kg)

Career information
- College: UM; UE
- PBA draft: 2015: 4th round, 46th overall pick
- Drafted by: GlobalPort Batang Pier
- Playing career: 2016–present
- Position: Shooting guard / small forward
- Number: 54, 77

Career history
- 2016–2018: Mahindra Enforcer/Floodbuster / Kia Picanto
- 2018: Batangas City Athletics
- 2018–2023: NLEX Road Warriors
- 2024: Zamboanga Master Sardines
- 2025: Pangasinan Abono Reapers/Heatwaves

Career highlights
- PBA D-League champion (2015 Aspirant's)

Pedrito "Bong" de Guzman Galanza Jr. (born December 21, 1992) is a Filipino professional basketball player who last played for Pangasinan Heatwaves franchise of the Maharlika Pilipinas Basketball League (MPBL) and Pilipinas Super League (PSL). He played college basketball at the University of the East, where became team captain during his senior year. He was drafted with the 46th pick of the 2015 PBA draft by the GlobalPort Batang Pier.

== College career ==
Galanza first played for the UM Hawks in the NAASCU for one year. He then joined the UE Red Warriors in the UAAP in 2012 beginning in Season 75. He was seldom-used in his first two years with UE, as he struggled to make UE's rotation, but he broke out in 2013 with 17 points in a win over the Adamson Soaring Falcons.

For his final season, Galanza was named team captain. He helped UE get its second win of the season with 16 points against the Adamson. He then had 19 points and five rebounds in a loss to the Ateneo Blue Eagles. In the second round, he led UE to a five-game winning streak to close out the elimination round. This included a win over Adamson in which he had 20 points on 4-of-7 shooting from three, and a win over the top-seeded FEU Tamaraws in which he scored a college career-high of 26 points. In a play-off game against the NU Bulldogs for the last Final Four slot, he attempted what could have been the game-winning shot, but missed, ending his college career.

== Professional career ==
=== Mahindra / Kia franchise ===
Galanza was drafted in the fifth round with the 46th pick of the 2015 PBA draft by the GlobalPort Batang Pier. However, he never got to play for them. Instead he first played in the PBA in 2016 for the Mahindra Enforcer. He played only three games for them in the 2015–16 season before he was made a free agent to make way for Gary David.

Galanza made it back to Mahindra during the 2016–17 Philippine Cup, scoring 13 points in a win over the NLEX Road Warriors. In the 2017 Governors' Cup, he led the locals in scoring with 15 points in a loss to the Phoenix Fuel Masters. Before the 2018 Commissioner's Cup, his contract was renewed.

=== Batangas City Athletics ===
In 2018, Galanza was added to the roster of the Batangas City Athletics in the MPBL. In his first game with them, he scored 28 points in a win over the Quezon City Capitals.

=== NLEX Road Warriors ===
On August 11, 2018, Galanza was signed by the NLEX Road Warriors before the start of the 2018 Governors' Cup, making his PBA return. He made his NLEX debut in a win over the TNT KaTropa with nine points and three rebounds. He then had 13 points in a loss to Phoenix.

In 2019, Galanza played the most minutes of his PBA career as NLEX dealt with Kevin Alas's injury and Kiefer Ravena's suspension. This led to him getting the ball in crunch time situations, but he wasn't able to make those shots. He also scored a career-high 19 points in a loss to TNT. He was able to follow up that performance with 14 points and 18 points (on six three-pointers) in back-to-back wins over the Alaska Aces and Blackwater Elite.

On January 21, 2021, Galanza's contract with NLEX was extended. In 2022, he was assigned to the Cavitex Braves in the PBA 3x3.

=== Zamboanga Master Sardines ===
In 2024, Galanza returned to the MPBL by joining the Zamboanga City Family Brand Sardines. He had 17 points in a loss to the Pangasinan Heatwaves. He was able to match that performance in a win over the Bulacan Kuyas. He then helped force overtime and scored 19 points in a win over the Abra Weavers. They made it to the quarterfinals that season where in Game 2, he scored three straight three-pointers in the fourth quarter to force an extra game and finish with 20 points. However, in the next game, the Parañaque Patriots were able to prevent them from moving on to the semis, as he missed a crucial three-pointer and made a costly turnover as well.

=== Pangasinan Abono Reapers / Heatwaves ===
In 2025, Galanza joined the Pangasinan Heatwaves. Against the Ilagan Isabela Cowboys, he led with a game-high 23 points with four rebounds to send Pangasinan to the MPBL playoffs.

== Career statistics ==
Legend
GP	Games played	MPG	Minutes per game
FG%	Field-goal percentage	3P%	3-point field-goal percentage	FT%	Free-throw percentage
RPG	Rebounds per game	APG	Assists per game	SPG	Steals per game
BPG	Blocks per game	PPG	Points per game	**Bold**	Career high

=== PBA season-by-season averages ===
As of the end of 2021 season

Year	Team	GP	MPG	FG%	3P%	FT%	RPG	APG	SPG	BPG	PPG
2015–16	Mahindra	3	11.0	.200	.000	—	1.3	.3	.3	**.3**	1.3
2016–17	Mahindra / Kia	18	10.2	.393	**.421**	.455	.9	.5	.2	.1	3.6
2017–18	Kia	23	16.8	.385	.296	.737	1.5	.9	**.5**	.1	6.0
2017–18	NLEX	23	16.8	.385	.296	.737	1.5	.9	**.5**	.1	6.0
2019	NLEX	**33**	**21.2**	**.404**	.328	.730	**2.2**	**1.2**	.4	.2	**7.8**
2020	NLEX	7	9.2	.320	.250	**1.000**	.9	.7	.0	.0	3.4
2021	NLEX	3	5.0	.222	.400	—	.7	.0	.0	.1	2.0
Career		87	15.9	.385	.321	.708	1.6	.9	.3	.1	5.7

=== College ===
Season	Team	GP	MP	FG%	3P%	FT%	TREB	AST	STL	BLK	PTS
2012	UE	13	13.0	.298	.263	75.0	1.6	.6	.2	.1	3.6
2013	UE	8	5.8	.346	.313	0.0	0.5	.4	.1	.0	2.9
2014	UE	**14**	**24.5**	**.426**	**.343**	**87.0**	**2.6**	**1.1**	**.6**	**.3**	**12.5**
Career		35	16.0	.387	.314	.852	1.8	.8	.3	.1	7.0
