= 2022 FilBasket Summer Championship =

Second tournament of FilBasket; first in 2022

2022 Filbasket Summer Championship

Tournament details
- Country: Philippines
- Venue(s): Muntinlupa Sports Center
- Dates: March 18 – May 8, 2022
- Teams: 12

Final positions
- Champions: Nueva Ecija Capitals
- Runner-up: San Juan Knights
- Semifinalists: All-Star Bacolod Ballers; Tanduay Rum Masters

The 2022 FilBasket Summer Championship, officially known as the Puregold – FilBasket 2022 Summer Championship for sponsorship reasons, was the second tournament of FilBasket, now known as AsiaBasket, the first tournament of 2022, and the first as a professional league, being granted professional status by the Games and Amusement Board (GAB) in February 2022. The tournament began on March 18, 2022, with the playoffs running from April 25 until May 8, 2022.

The Nueva Ecija Capitals defeated the San Juan Knights in the Finals, which ignited a rivalry between the two teams that would extend into other leagues.

The 2022 Summer Championship is the first and currently only tournament to take place across multiple cities, with San Jose del Monte, Bulacan, Quezon City, and Muntinlupa hosting the games, with the latter also hosting the Finals series.

== Teams ==
On top of the eleven Filipino teams taking part, the Kuala Lumpur Aseel based in Kuala Lumpur, Malaysia, served as the league's first international team, putting the total to twelve teams.

Name	Locality / College	Last appearance	Best result
AFP-FSD Makati Cavaliers	Makati	Subic 2021	Elimination round (1x)
All-Star Bacolod Ballers	Bacolod	Debut	
AMA Online Education Titans	AMA University	Debut	
Danao City MJAS Zenith	Danao, Cebu	Debut	
ICC Blue Hawks	Immaculada Concepcion College	Debut	
Kuala Lumpur Aseel (guest team)	(Malaysia) Kuala Lumpur	Debut	
Muntinlupa Angelis Resort - EOG Cooly	Muntinlupa	Subic 2021	Quarterfinalist (1x)
Nueva Ecija Capitals	Nueva Ecija	Debut	
Pasig Sta. Lucia Realtors	Pasig	Subic 2021	Semifinalist (1x)
San Juan Knights	San Juan	Subic 2021	Runner-up (1x)
Tanduay Rum Masters	Batangas City	Subic 2021	Quarterfinalist (1x)
Zamboanga Family's Brand Sardines	Zamboanga Peninsula	Debut	

== Format ==
All participating teams played in a single round-robin format, where each team plays one game against all other teams, for a total of 11 games.

The top eight teams then advanced to a three-round, single-elimination playoff bracket. The Quarterfinals gives the top three a twice-to-beat advantage, needing them only one win to advance while their opponents need to win twice. The 4–5 match would instead be a single game affair. The Semifinals and Finals are both best-of-three series.

== Elimination round ==
=== Standings ===
Pos	Team	Pld	W	L	PCT	GB	Qualification
1	Tanduay Rum Masters	11	11	0	1.000	—	Twice-to-beat in Quarterfinals
2	Nueva Ecija Capitals	11	10	1	.909	1	Twice-to-beat in Quarterfinals
3	All-Star Bacolod Ballers Bingo Plus	11	7	4	.636	4	Twice-to-beat in Quarterfinals
4	Pasig Sta. Lucia Realtors	11	6	5	.545 (Note: PSG (2–1) and SJK (2–1) win tiebreaker over AFMC (1–2) and KLA (1–2) based on head-to-head standings; PSG (1–0) wins tiebreaker over SJK (0–1) based on head-to-head matchup; AFP (1–0) wins tiebreaker over KLA (0–1) based on head-to-head matchup.)	5	Single-game knockout in Quarterfinals
5	San Juan Knights	11	6	5	.545	5	Single-game knockout in Quarterfinals
6	AFP-FSD Makati Cavaliers	11	6	5	.545	5	Twice-to-win in Quarterfinals
7	Kuala Lumpur Aseel	11	6	5	.545	5	Twice-to-win in Quarterfinals
8	Muntinlupa Angelis Resort - EOG Sports	11	5	6	.455 (Note: MUN (1–0) wins tiebreaker over ZAM (0–1) based on head-to-head matchup.)	6	Twice-to-win in Quarterfinals
9	Zamboanga Family's Brand Sardines	11	5	6	.455	6	
10	Danao City MJAS Zenith	11	3	8	.273	8	
11	AMA Online Education Titans	11	1	10	.091	10	
12	ICC Blue Hawks	11	0	11	.000	11	

Source: Standings – via Genius Sports

=== Results ===
Teams	AFMC	ASBB	AMA	DAN	ICC	KLA	MUN	NEC	PSG	SJK	TAN	ZAM
AFP-FSD Makati Cavaliers		69–77	98–81	89–86	104–86	83–76	104–102	63–93	74–79	63–80	60–106	78–74
All-Star Bacolod Ballers			94–91	84–75	99–89	80–77	77–80	74–86	69–62	77–73	59–66	70–79
AMA Online Education Titans				85–97	99–94	71–90	87–112	80–91	76–99	76–105	80–122	65–98
Danao City MJAS Zenith					89–80	67–80	66–73	77–84	80–90	90–88	70–77	64–76
ICC Blue Hawks						87–115	91–109	82–116	83–95	84–95	80–90	74–101
Kuala Lumpur Aseel							90–79	69–95	84–83	64–92	59–66	91–84
Muntinlupa Angelis Resort								88–102	78–91	83–86	67–81	80–73
Nueva Ecija Capitals									92–81	95–92	82–86	99–76
Pasig Sta. Lucia Realtors										72–71	74–82	65–84
San Juan Knights											76–78	98–82
Tanduay Rum Masters												72–71
Zamboanga Family's Brand Sardines												

Source: Schedule – via Genius Sports
Legend: Blue = left column team win; Red = top row team win.
Matches with lighter background shading were decided after overtime.

== Playoffs ==
=== Bracket ===
Quarterfinals (Twice-to-beat / single game)
1	Tanduay Rum Masters	89	–
8	Muntinlupa Angelis Resort	74	–
4	Pasig Sta. Lucia Realtors	91	–
5	San Juan Knights	93	–
2	Nueva Ecija Capitals	101	–
7	Kuala Lumpur Aseel	83	–
3	All-Star Bacolod Ballers	83	–
6	AFP-FSD Makati Cavaliers	78	–

Semifinals (Single game)
1	Tanduay Rum Masters	75	81	–
5	San Juan Knights	101	92	–
2	Nueva Ecija Capitals	88	88	–
3	All-Star Bacolod Ballers	77	72	–

Finals (Best-of-3)
5	San Juan Knights	61	71	88
2	Nueva Ecija Capitals	77	65	90

=== Quarterfinals ===
==== (1) Tanduay Rum Masters vs. (8) Muntinlupa Angelis Resort ====
April 25
1:00PM

Boxscore

Tanduay Rum Masters 89, Muntinlupa Angelis Resort - EOG Sports 74
Scoring by quarter: 20–12, 19–20, 26–24, 24–18
Pts: Ablaza 16; Rebs: Apinan 10; Asts: Lingganay 7	Pts: Neypes 17; Rebs: Neypes 11; Asts: Dennison 4
Tanduay wins series in one game

San Jose Del Monte Sports Complex

==== (2) Nueva Ecija Capitals vs. (3) Kuala Lumpur Aseel ====
April 25
7:00PM

Boxscore

Nueva Ecija Capitals 101, Kuala Lumpur Aseel 83
Scoring by quarter: 19–23, 26–9, 36–32, 20–19
Pts: Villarias 18; Rebs: McAloney 10; Asts: two players 5	Pts: Chang 15; Rebs: Kuek 7 Asts: Teo 5
Nueva Ecija wins series in one game

San Jose Del Monte Sports Complex

==== (3) All-Star Bacolod Ballers vs. (6) AFP-FSD Makati Cavaliers ====
April 25
3:00PM

Boxscore

All-Star Bacolod Ballers Bingo Plus 83, AFP-FSD Makati Cavaliers 78 (OT)
Scoring by quarter: 23–15, 12–26, 22–16, 18–18, Overtime: 8–3
Pts: Yee 22; Rebs: Yee 15; Asts: Lee Yu 6	Pts: Formento 21; Rebs: Colina 7 Asts: Colina 4
All-Star Bacolod wins series in one game

San Jose Del Monte Sports Complex

==== (4) Pasig Sta. Lucia Realtors vs. (5) San Juan Knights ====
April 25
5:00PM

Boxscore

Pasig Sta. Lucia Realtors 91, San Juan Knights 93 (OT)
Scoring by quarter: 27–23, 16–18, 22–24, 15–15, Overtime: 11–13
Pts: Manzo 22; Rebs: Tamayo 10; Asts: two players 4	Pts: Clarito 23; Rebs: Clarito 18; Asts: Wamar 5
San Juan wins series in one game

San Jose Del Monte Sports Complex

=== Semifinals ===
==== (1) Tanduay Rum Masters vs. (5) San Juan Knights ====
April 29
5:00PM

Boxscore

Tanduay Rum Masters 75, San Juan Knights 101
Scoring by quarter: 20–30, 11–24, 27–21, 17–26
Pts: Villanueva 17; Rebs: Ablaza 6 Asts: Lingganay 4	Pts: two players 19; Rebs: Clarito 8 Asts: Clarito 6

San Jose Del Monte Sports Complex

May 1
5:00PM

Boxscore

Tanduay Rum Masters 81, San Juan Knights 92
Scoring by quarter: 25–23, 21–24, 24–21, 11–24
Pts: two players 20; Rebs: Apinan 14; Asts: two players 4	Pts: two players 15; Rebs: Clarito 14; Asts: Isit 7
San Juan wins series, 2–0

San Jose Del Monte Sports Complex

==== (2) Nueva Ecija Capitals vs. (3) All-Star Bacolod Ballers ====
April 29
7:00PM

Boxscore

Nueva Ecija Capitals 88, All-Star Bacolod Ballers Bingo Plus 77
Scoring by quarter: 19–20, 24–19, 26–18, 19–20
Pts: Mabulac 13; Rebs: Juico 9 Asts: Bitoon 6	Pts: two players 15; Rebs: two players 9 Asts: Villoria 6

San Jose Del Monte Sports Complex

May 1
7:00PM

Boxscore

Nueva Ecija Capitals 88, All-Star Bacolod Ballers Bingo Plus 72
Scoring by quarter: 24–14, 21–26, 20–19, 23–13
Pts: Mabulac 14; Rebs: Mabulac 7 Asts: Gabo 11	Pts: Garcia 12; Rebs: Alday 5 Asts: Casino 6
Nueva Ecija wins series, 2–0

San Jose Del Monte Sports Complex

=== Finals: (2) Nueva Ecija Capitals vs. (5) San Juan Knights ===
==== Game 1 ====
May 4
6:00PM

Boxscore

Nueva Ecija Capitals 77, San Juan Knights 61
Scoring by quarter: 24–12, 14–13, 22–14, 17–22
Pts: McAloney 15; Rebs: Juico 7 Asts: two players 4	Pts: Gutang 14; Rebs: two players 7 Asts: two players 4

Muntinlupa Sports Complex

==== Game 2 ====
May 6
5:00PM

Boxscore

San Juan Knights 71, Nueva Ecija Capitals 65
Scoring by quarter: 10–15, 19–15, 19–20, 23–15
Pts: Fuentes 16; Rebs: Ular 10; Asts: Wamar 5	Pts: Mabulac 14; Rebs: two players 7 Asts: Gabo 6

Muntinlupa Sports Complex

==== Game 3 ====
May 8
6:00PM

Boxscore

Nueva Ecija Capitals 90, San Juan Knights 88 (OT)
Scoring by quarter: 17–20, 12–19, 28–22, 22–18, Overtime: 11–9
Pts: Juico 17; Rebs: Mabulac 13; Asts: three players 4	Pts: two players 16; Rebs: Gutang 13; Asts: Wamar 6
Nueva Ecija wins the series, 2–1

Muntinlupa Sports Complex
