= 2022 MPBL finals =

Championship series of the Maharlika Pilipinas Basketball League's 2022 season

Team	Coach	Wins
Nueva Ecija Rice Vanguards	Jerson Cabiltes	3
Zamboanga Family's Brand Sardines	Vic Ycasiano	1
- Dates: December 2–12, 2022
- MVP: Byron Villarias
- Northern finals: Nueva Ecija def. San Juan, 2–1
- Southern finals: Zamboanga def. Batangas City, 2–1

The 2022 MPBL finals was the championship series of the Maharlika Pilipinas Basketball League's (MPBL) 2022 season and the conclusion of the season's playoffs. In the best-of-five playoff, the North Division champion Nueva Ecija Rice Vanguards defeated the South Division champion Zamboanga Family's Brand Sardines, as they won the league's fourth championship. Byron Villarias named as the season's Finals MVP.

First-seeded Nueva Ecija (21–0) held homecourt advantage for the series, having a better record than Zamboanga (18–3). This marks the first finals appearance for both teams.

This was the first finals series in which neither team is based in Metro Manila.

== Background ==
=== Nueva Ecija Rice Vanguards ===
The Nueva Ecija Rice Vanguards finished the 2021 MPBL Invitational as runner-up after being defeated by the Basilan Peace Riders on a championship-winning basket in overtime. They finished the regular season with a 21–0 win–loss record, making them the first team to go undefeated in the regular season. Because of this, the Rice Vanguards were able to clinch the first seed overall and homecourt advantage throughout the playoffs. In the first two rounds of the playoffs, The Rice Vanguards easily won against the Marikina Shoemasters and the Pampanga Giant Lanterns both in two games each. In the Northern Division finals, they met the 2021 season runner-up San Juan Knights, battling for the Northern Division title. In Game 1, the Rice Vanguards was defeated by the Knights for the first time this season, but they managed to win the next two games, bringing the Rice Vanguards to their first North Division title and first finals appearance.

=== Zamboanga Family's Brand Sardines ===
The Zamboanga Family's Brand Sardines ended their regular season with 18–3 win–loss record to become the top seed in the South Division and clinch homecourt advantage for the division playoffs. They easily defeated the Muntinlupa Cagers in the first round and then forced a Game 3 against the Bacolod Bingo Plus in the division semifinals. In the division finals, they faced the 2018 MPBL champion Batangas City Embassy Chill, where they lost the first game, but forced Game 3 and won, to claim the South Division title and bring Zamboanga to their first finals appearance.

== Road to the finals ==
Nueva Ecija Rice Vanguards (Northern Division Champion)		Zamboanga Family's Brand Sardines (Southern Division Champion)
Pos / Team / Pld / W / L / GB / Qualification; 1 / Nueva Ecija Rice Vanguards / 21 / 21 / 0 / — / Playoffs; 2 / Pasig City MCW Sports / 21 / 14 (Note: Pasig (1.193), San Juan (0.993), and Pampanga (0.850) are ranked based on head-to-head point quotient.) / 7 / 7 / Playoffs; 3 / San Juan Knights / 21 / 14 / 7 / 7 / Playoffs; 4 / Pampanga Giant Lanterns / 21 / 14 / 7 / 7 / Playoffs; 5 / Bataan Risers / 21 / 13 / 8 / 8 / Playoffs; 6 / Valenzuela XUR Homes Realty Inc. / 21 / 10 / 11 / 11 / Playoffs; 7 / Quezon City MG / 21 / 9 / 12 / 12 / Playoffs; 8 / Marikina Shoemasters / 21 / 8 / 13 / 13 / Playoffs; 9 / Caloocan Excellence / 21 / 6 (Note: Caloocan wins tiebreaker over Manila by head-to-head victory.) / 15 / 15; 10 / Manila Stars / 21 / 6 / 15 / 15; 11 / Makati × MNL Kingpin / 21 / 2 / 19 / 19; Source: Standings; Notes: 1st seed in the North, 1st best league record	Regular season	Pos / Team / Pld / W / L / GB / Qualification; 1 / Zamboanga Family's Brand Sardines / 21 / 18 / 3 / — / Playoffs; 2 / Batangas City Embassy Chill / 21 / 17 / 4 / 1 / Playoffs; 3 / Sarangani Marlins / 21 / 16 / 5 / 2 / Playoffs; 4 / GenSan Warriors / 21 / 15 / 6 / 3 / Playoffs; 5 / Bacolod Bingo Plus / 21 / 14 / 7 / 4 / Playoffs; 6 / Rizal Golden Coolers / 21 / 10 / 11 / 8 / Playoffs; 7 / Bacoor City Strikers / 21 / 9 / 12 / 9 / Playoffs; 8 / Muntinlupa Cagers / 21 / 6 / 15 / 12 / Playoffs; 9 / Imus City Bandera / 21 / 5 / 16 / 13; 10 / Laguna Heroes / 21 / 3 / 18 / 15; 11 / Mindoro Tams / 21 / 1 / 20 / 17; Source: Standings 1st seed in the South, 2nd best league record
Defeated 8th-seeded Marikina Shoemasters, 2–0	First Round	Defeated 8th-seeded Muntinlupa Cagers, 2–0
Defeated 4th-seeded Pampanga Giant Lanterns, 2–0	Division semifinals	Defeated 5th-seeded Bacolod Bingo Plus, 2–1
Defeated 3rd-seeded San Juan Knights, 2–1	Division finals	Defeated 2nd-seeded Batangas City Embassy Chill, 2–1

=== Head-to-head matchup ===
One PH
IWantTFC

August 8
9:00 pm

Boxscore

Nueva Ecija Rice Vanguards	81–76	Zamboanga Family's Brand Sardines
Scoring by quarter: 11–13, 27–16, 21–27, 22–20
Pts: Michael Juico 16; Rebs: Michael Mabulac 7 Asts: Hesed Gabo 13		Pts: Jaycee Marcelino, Jerald Bautista 15; Rebs: Chris Dumapig 12; Asts: Irven Palencia 5

Nueva Ecija Coliseum, Palayan, Nueva Ecija

== Series summary ==
Game	Date	Away team	Result	Home team	Venue
1	December 2	Zamboanga Family's Brand Sardines	75–81 (0–1)	Nueva Ecija Rice Vanguards	Nueva Ecija Coliseum
2	December 5	Zamboanga Family's Brand Sardines	74–75 (0–2)	Nueva Ecija Rice Vanguards	Nueva Ecija Coliseum
3	December 9	Nueva Ecija Rice Vanguards	65–75 (2–1)	Zamboanga Family's Brand Sardines	Mayor Vitaliano D. Agan Coliseum
4	December 12	Nueva Ecija Rice Vanguards	69–56 (3–1)	Zamboanga Family's Brand Sardines	Mayor Vitaliano D. Agan Coliseum

== Game summaries ==
=== Game 1 ===
One PH
One Sports+

December 2
6:30 pm

Boxscore

Nueva Ecija Rice Vanguards	81–75	Zamboanga Family's Brand Sardines
Scoring by quarter: 15–14, 14–16, 27–18, 25–27
Pts: Hesed Gabo 22; Rebs: Michael Juico 11; Asts: Hesed Gabo 6		Pts: Chris Dumapig 15; Rebs: Jhaymo Enguilos 8 Asts: Jaycee Marcelino 8
Nueva Ecija lead series, 1–0

Nueva Ecija Coliseum, Palayan, Nueva Ecija
Referees: J. Belnas, R. Brila, J. Castroverde,

=== Game 2 ===
One PH
One Sports+

December 5
6:30 pm

Boxscore

Nueva Ecija Rice Vanguards	75–74	Zamboanga Family's Brand Sardines
Scoring by quarter: 13–20, 24–18, 21–12, 17–24
Pts: Jay Collado 13; Rebs: Michael Juico, Will McAloney 9 Asts: Michael Mabulac 4		Pts: Jaycee Marcelino 26; Rebs: Jaycee Marcelino 7 Asts: three players 4
Nueva Ecija lead series, 2–0

Nueva Ecija Coliseum, Palayan, Nueva Ecija
Referees: S. Pingolz, J. Ocfemia, B. Estroga,

=== Game 3 ===
One PH
One Sports+

December 9
9:00 pm

Boxscore

Nueva Ecija Rice Vanguards	65–75	Zamboanga Family's Brand Sardines
Scoring by quarter: 16–16, 12–22, 20–15, 17–22
Pts: Michael Mabulac 15; Rebs: Michael Mabulac, Will McAloney 8 Asts: Chris Bitoon 6		Pts: Jaycee Marcelino 22; Rebs: Jaycee Marcelino 10; Asts: Jaycee Marcelino 9
Nueva Ecija lead series 2–1

Mayor Vitaliano D. Agan Coliseum, Zamboanga City
Referees: A. Manzano, J. Macailo, E. Villarosa,

=== Game 4 ===
One PH
One Sports+

December 12
6:30 pm

Boxscore

Nueva Ecija Rice Vanguards	69–56	Zamboanga Family's Brand Sardines
Scoring by quarter: 15–15, 25–9, 9–16, 20–16
Pts: John Villarias 14; Rebs: John Villarias, JR Taganas 10; Asts: Hesed Gabo 9		Pts: Jaycee Marcelino 17; Rebs: Jhaymo Enguilos, Ralph Tansingco 8 Asts: Jayvee Marcelino 3
Nueva Ecija wins series 3–1

Mayor Vitaliano D. Agan Coliseum, Zamboanga City

== Broadcast notes ==
This marked the first year of Cignal TV's rights to the MPBL finals. The series was broadcast on One PH and One Sports+ on television, and was also streamed via Facebook, YouTube, and Kumu.

Game	One PH and One Sports+ (Delayed Telecast)		
Game	Play-by-play	Analyst	Courtside reporter
Game 1	Cedelf Tupas	Jayvee Gayoso	Mica Abesamis
Game 2	Cedelf Tupas	Louie Gonzalez	Gianna Lianes
Game 3	Migs Gomez	Javi Palaña	Sel Guevara and Sydney Crespo
Game 4	Migs Gomez	Javi Palaña	Mica Abesamis and Sydney Crespo

== Prizes ==
This season featured a new design for the championship trophy, steering away from a design modelled after the National Basketball Association's (NBA) Larry O'Brien Championship Trophy. Alongside the trophy, rings were given to the players of the championship-winning team.

The MPBL Finals Most Valuable Player award and Coach of the Year awards are also given out during the trophy ceremony.
