= 2026 MPBL playoffs =

Playoffs for the Maharlika Pilipinas Basketball League's 2026 season

2026 SportsPlus MPBL Playoffs presented by Xtreme Manny Pay

Tournament details
- Country: Philippines
- Dates: September 25, 2026 – December 2026
- Teams: 20
- Defending champions: Abra Weavers

The 2026 MPBL playoffs is the upcoming postseason tournament of the Maharlika Pilipinas Basketball League's 2026 season, the league's eighth overall, and second under play-in tournament format. The postseason tournament began in September, after the conclusion of the regular season.

== Overview ==
=== Updates to playoff appearances ===
- The Abra Weavers entered the playoffs for the third consecutive season and also clinch the best record in the league for the second consecutive season.
- The Quezon Huskers entered the playoffs for the fourth consecutive season and also clinch the best record in the South Division for the third consecutive season.
- The Batangas City Tanduay Rum Masters entered the playoffs for the eighth consecutive season, currently the longest playoff streak in the MPBL.
- The San Juan Knights, GenSan Warriors and Zamboanga Sikat entered the playoffs for the seventh consecutive season.
- The Caloocan Batang Kankaloo and Pasay Voyagers entered the playoffs for the fourth consecutive season.
- The Rizal Golden Coolers and Biñan Tatak Gel entered the playoffs for the third consecutive season.
- The Ilagan Isabela Cowboys and Mindoro Tamaraws entered the playoffs for the second consecutive season.
- The Meycauayan Marilao Gems entered the playoffs for the first time after relocating from Muntinlupa. Their last playoff appearance was in 2023 when they were still known as the Muntinlupa Cagers.
- The Cebu Greats entered the playoffs for the first time since 2019 playoffs.
- The Bataan Risers and Quezon City Black Bulls entered the playoffs for the first time since 2022 playoffs.

=== Division Quarterfinals ===
- The Zamboanga Sikat became the third team in MPBL playoffs history to force Game 3 in Division Quarterfinals as the #8 seed.

=== Division Semifinals ===
- The San Juan Knights entered the Division Semifinals for the record-extending seventh straight time. They are the only team in MPBL Playoffs history to never miss a Division Semifinal appearance in the current playoff format.
- The Caloocan Batang Kankaloo entered the Division Semifinals for the fourth straight time.
- The Quezon Huskers enter the Division Semifinals for the third straight time.
- The Abra Weavers and Biñan Tatak Gel enter the Division Semifinals for the second straight time.
- The Rizal Golden Coolers enter the Division Semifinals for the first time since 2022.
- The Cebu Greats and Pasay Voyagers entered the Division Semifinals for the first time.
- The Batangas City Tanduay Rum Masters will miss the Division Semifinals for the first time since 2020-21 MPBL Playoffs.
- The GenSan Warriors will miss the Division Semifinals for the first time since 2022 MPBL Playoffs.

=== Division Finals ===
- The San Juan Knights entered the Division Finals for the first time since 2024. They are also the only team to reach the Division Finals six times.
- The Quezon Huskers entered the Division Finals for the third straight time.
- The Biñan Tatak Gel and Abra Weavers entered the Division Finals for the second straight time.
- San Juan's Game 1 defeat over Abra make their first loss against a fellow North Division team this season. In addition, they were 18-0 against fellow North Division opponents this season and prior to North Division Finals.

=== National Finals ===
- The Quezon Huskers became the first MPBL team to appear in three National Finals, also the first to do it consecutively. In addition, they also have the most losses in MPBL Finals history (0-6 overall).
- The matchup between Abra Solid North Weavers and the Quezon Huskers became the second time that there has been a rematch in the National Finals after San Juan-Davao Occidental in 2019 and 2021.

=== Notable events ===
- For the third straight playoffs, both #3 and #4 seeds in South Division didn't advance to Division Semifinals.
- This marked the first playoffs since the introduction of the Play-In Tournament that none of the teams seeded #8 of both divisions made the playoffs. Also, this is the first playoffs that a 9th-seeded team made the playoffs.
- This marked the first MPBL Playoffs that no Game 3 has been played in Division Semifinals.

== Format ==
The top six teams from each division advance to the playoffs, while The seventh and eighth-ranked teams will play for the seventh seed in the playoffs. The losing team will face the winner of the game between the ninth and tenth-ranked teams for the eighth seed and the final playoff spot. Due to this change, only the top six teams will directly advance to the playoffs. Seeding is based on wins, with tiebreaker rules applied should multiple teams have the same record. The single-elimination bracket consists of four rounds with no reseeding. The first two rounds being a best-of-three series; the division finals being a best-of-five series; and the national finals being a best-of-seven series for the first time.

During the first two rounds, two games within the same division are played in a gameday, with homecourt advantage alternating between the higher-seeded teams of each series. A traditional homecourt format is then used for the last two rounds, with the division finals using a 2–2–1 format and the national finals using a 2–2–1–1–1 format. The designated home team may not be able to play within its home locality. Should it occur, the gameday may take place elsewhere.

== Division standings ==
North Division

Pos	Team	Pld	W	L	GB
1	z – Abra Weavers	25	23	2	—
2	x – San Juan Knights	25	22	3	1
3	x – Caloocan Batang Kankaloo	25	20	5	3
4	x – Meycauayan Marilao Gems	25	14 (Note: Meycauayan Marilao wins tiebreaker over Pasay based on head-to-head match-up.)	11	9
5	x – Pasay Voyagers	25	14	11	9
6	x – Ilagan Isabela Cowboys	25	13	12	10
7	x – Bataan Risers	25	11 (Note: Bataan (1.049) wins tiebreaker over Pasig (1.028), and Quezon City (0.927) based on head-to-head point quotient.)	14	12
8	p – Pasig City	25	11	14	12
9	x – Quezon City Black Bulls	25	11	14	12
10	p – Valenzuela City Darkhorse	25	10	15	13

Source: Standings
p – Clinched play-in berth, but failed to reach playoffs; x – Clinched playoff berth; z – Clinched best record in league
Notes:

South Division

Pos	Team	Pld	W	L	GB
1	y – Quezon Huskers	25	21 (Note: Quezon wins tiebreaker over Biñan based on head-to-head match-up.)	4	—
2	x – Biñan Tatak Gel	25	21	4	—
3	x – GenSan Warriors	25	19 (Note: General Santos (1.051) wins tiebreaker over Batangas City (1.013), and Cebu (0.942) based on head-to-head point quotient.)	6	2
4	x – Batangas City Athletics	25	19	6	2
5	x – Cebu Greats	25	19	6	2
6	x – Rizal Golden Coolers	25	16	9	5
7	x – Mindoro Tamaraws	25	13 (Note: Mindoro wins tiebreaker over Basilan based on head-to-head match-up.)	12	8
8	p – Basilan Steel	25	13	12	8
9	x – Zamboanga Sikat	25	11	14	10
10	p – Imus Bandera	25	4	21	17

Source: Standings
p – Clinched play-in berth, but failed to reach playoffs; x – Clinched playoff berth; y – Clinched best record in division

== Play-in tournament ==
=== North Division ===
Play-in games
7	Bataan	83
8	Pasig City	75
9	Quezon City	76
10	Valenzuela	71

No. 8 seed game
8	Pasig City	81
9	Quezon City	95

Final seeds
7	Bataan	No. 7 seed
9	Quezon City	No. 8 seed

Solar Sports

September 25
5:00 p.m.

Boxscore

Quezon City Black Bulls	76–71	Valenzuela City Darkhorse
Scoring by quarter: 28–14, 16–20, 13–21, 19–16
Pts: Kobe Monje 23; Rebs: MJ Joson, Joeben Loria 9 Asts: Ryan Costelo 9		Pts: Jay Collado, CJ Alattica 15; Rebs: Jay Collado, Geremy Robinson Jr. 11; Asts: Geremy Robinson Jr. 6

Camaya Coast Events Play Center, Mariveles, Bataan
Referees: Edmar Avis, Richard Carpio, Edrick Chico

Solar Sports

September 25
7:00 p.m.

Boxscore

Pasig City	75–83	Bataan Risers
Scoring by quarter: 23–17, 21–19, 8–24, 23–23
Pts: Jacob Galicia 21; Rebs: Jacob Galicia 12; Asts: Warlo Batac 5		Pts: Miggy Corteza 18; Rebs: Robbi Darang 9 Asts: Tutoy Ramirez 5
Bataan wins the 7th seed.

Camaya Coast Events Play Center, Mariveles, Bataan
Referees: Allan Manzano, Rafael Del Mar, Eduardo Villarosa

Solar Sports

September 30
5:00 p.m.

Boxscore

Quezon City Black Bulls	95–81	Pasig City
Scoring by quarter: 29–13, 18–10, 30–31, 18–27
Pts: Ryan Costelo 22; Rebs: Jessie Sumoda, MJ Joson 9 Asts: Val Chauca, MJ Joson 9		Pts: Warlo Batac 20; Rebs: Jacob Galicia 11; Asts: Warlo Batac 7
Quezon City wins the 8th seed.

One Arena, Cainta, Rizal
Referees: Mollie De Luna, Severino Pingol, Alvin Sosongco

=== South Division ===
Play-in games
7	Mindoro	77
8	Basilan	72
9	Zamboanga	86
10	Imus	61

No. 8 seed game
8	Basilan	59
9	Zamboanga	83

Final seeds
7	Mindoro	No. 7 seed
9	Zamboanga	No. 8 seed

Solar Sports

September 28
5:00 p.m.

Boxscore

Zamboanga Sikat	86–61	Imus Bandera
Scoring by quarter: 27–20, 29–11, 11–14, 19–16
Pts: Brandon Wilson 12; Rebs: Joseph Gabayni 8 Asts: Rafael Are 12		Pts: Dylan Darbin 17; Rebs: Justine Padua 8 Asts: Ian Pardo 5

Calapan City Coliseum, Calapan, Oriental Mindoro
Referees: Maynard Centeno, Ronn Ivan Baluyot, Danilo Rivera

Solar Sports

September 28
7:00 p.m.

Boxscore

Basilan Steel	72–77	Mindoro Tamaraws
Scoring by quarter: 10–10, 22–32, 17–15, 25–18
Pts: Byron Villarias 17; Rebs: Byron Villarias 7 Asts: Gab Cometa 6		Pts: JJ Caspe 23; Rebs: JJ Caspe 11; Asts: Brian Heruela 6
Mindoro wins the 7th seed.

Calapan City Coliseum, Calapan, Oriental Mindoro
Referees: Ian Borbe, Rowen Inductivo, Edgar Orpilla

Solar Sports

September 30
7:00 p.m.

Boxscore

Zamboanga Sikat	83–59	Basilan Steel
Scoring by quarter: 16–13, 16–11, 25–17, 26–18
Pts: Brandon Wilson 21; Rebs: Brandon Wilson 14; Asts: Forthsky Padrigao 7		Pts: Byron Villarias 12; Rebs: Byron Villarias 5 Asts: Gab Cometa 5
Zamboanga wins the 8th seed.

One Arena, Cainta, Rizal
Referees: Jay Castroverde, Edmar Avis, Mark Quilinguen

== Bracket ==
Teams in bold advanced to the next round. Teams in italics have homecourt advantage for the series. The numbers to the left of each team indicate the team's seeding in its division, while the numbers to the right indicate the number of games the team won in that round.

Division quarterfinals (best-of-3)	Division semifinals (best-of-3)
N1	**Abra**	**2**
N8	Quezon City	0
N1	**Abra**	**2**
N5	Pasay	0
N4	Meycauayan Marilao	1
N5	**Pasay**	**2**
**North Division**
N2	**San Juan**	**2**
N7	Bataan	0
N2	**San Juan**	**2**
N3	Caloocan	0
N3	**Caloocan**	**2**
N6	Ilagan Isabela	0
S1	**Quezon**	**2**
S8	Zamboanga	1
S1	**Quezon**	**2**
S5	Cebu	0
S4	Batangas City	0
S5	**Cebu**	**2**
**South Division**
S2	**Biñan**	**2**
S7	Mindoro	0
S2	**Biñan**	**2**
S6	Rizal	0
S3	General Santos	0
S6	**Rizal**	**2**

Division finals (best-of-5)
N1	**Abra**	**3**
N2	San Juan	0
S1	**Quezon**	**3**
S2	Biñan	1

National finals (best-of-7)
N1	Abra
S1	Quezon

== Division quarterfinals ==
NOTE: All times are Philippine Standard Time (UTC+8:00).

=== North Division quarterfinals ===
==== (1) Abra Weavers vs. (8) Quezon City Black Bulls ====
Solar Sports

October 9
7:00 p.m.

Boxscore

Quezon City Black Bulls	54–106	Abra Weavers
Scoring by quarter: 15–34, 9–18, 12–31, 18–23
Pts: Kobe Monje 14; Rebs: three players 5 Asts: Val Chauca 4		Pts: DJ Fenner 19; Rebs: Drex Delos Reyes 12; Asts: Dave Ildefonso 5
Abra leads series, 1–0

University of Bangued Gymnasium, Bangued, Abra

Solar Sports

October 15
5:00 p.m.

Boxscore

Abra Weavers	84–70	Quezon City Black Bulls
Scoring by quarter: 24—9, 20–10, 22–26, 18–25
Pts: DJ Fenner 13; Rebs: Drex Delos Reyes, DJ Fenner 6 Asts: Encho Serrano 5		Pts: Val Chauca 19; Rebs: Jessie Sumoda, Aeron Baganu 8 Asts: Rey Publico, Val Chauca 4
Abra wins series, 2–0

Bulacan Capitol Gymnasium, Malolos, Bulacan
Referees: Jay Castroverde, Alvin Sosongco, Richard Carpio

Head-to-head matchup

Solar Sports

August 27
3:00 p.m.

Boxscore

Abra Weavers	79–51	Quezon City Black Bulls
Scoring by quarter: 16–10, 15–13, 21–11, 27–17
Pts: Dave Ildefonso 16; Rebs: Encho Serrano 6 Asts: Dave Ildefonso 10		Pts: MJ Joson 16; Rebs: Clark Derige 6 Asts: Val Chauca 5

Caloocan Sports Complex, Caloocan

This is the first playoff meeting between Abra and Quezon City.

==== (2) San Juan Knights vs. (7) Bataan Risers ====
Solar Sports

October 5
7:00 p.m.

Boxscore

Bataan Risers	84–94	San Juan Knights
Scoring by quarter: 28–29, 19–21, 16–29, 21–15
Pts: Yves Sazon 30; Rebs: Miggy Corteza 7 Asts: Alfred Flores 4		Pts: Michael Calisaan 18; Rebs: Dexter Maiquez 12; Asts: Patrick Sleat 10
San Juan leads series, 1–0

Ynares Sports Arena, Pasig
Referees: Edmar Avis, Severino Pingol Jr, Richard Carpio

Solar Sports

October 13
5:00 p.m.

Boxscore

San Juan Knights	82–77	Bataan Risers
Scoring by quarter: 17–9, 17–14, 27–25, 21–29
Pts: Orlan Wamar Jr. 16; Rebs: Patrick Sleat, Harold Alarcon 8 Asts: Harold Alarcon 8		Pts: Miggy Corteza, Alfred Flores 13; Rebs: Jamil Gabawan, Miggy Corteza 6 Asts: Alfred Flores
San Juan wins series, 2–0

Caloocan Sports Complex, Caloocan
Referees: Allan Manzano, Alvin Sosongco, E. Michael Santos

Head-to-head matchup

Solar Sports

June 30
6:00 p.m.

Boxscore

San Juan Knights	102–95	Bataan Risers
Scoring by quarter: 23–20, 26–22, 26–24, 27–29
Pts: Patrick Sleat 21; Rebs: Patrick Sleat 8 Asts: Orlan Wamar Jr. 9		Pts: Hubert Cani 18; Rebs: Chris Javier 7 Asts: Hubert Cani 6

Ynares Sports Arena, Pasig
Referees: John Abobo, Mark Quilinguen, R. Robles

This is the first playoff meeting between San Juan and Bataan.

==== (3) Caloocan Batang Kankaloo vs. (6) Ilagan Isabela Cowboys ====
Solar Sports

October 5
5:00 p.m.

Boxscore

Caloocan Batang Kankaloo	81–76	Ilagan Isabela Cowboys
Scoring by quarter: 20–16, 24–13, 21–22, 16–25
Pts: Kean Baclaan 16; Rebs: Kymani Ladi 10; Asts: Kean Baclaan 5		Pts: Robby Celiz 20; Rebs: Robby Celiz 12; Asts: Allen Mina, MJ Ayaay 3
Caloocan leads series, 1–0

Ynares Sports Arena, Pasig
Referees: Allan Manzano, Hallyric Damicog, Ian Borbe

Solar Sports

October 13
7:00 p.m.

Boxscore

Ilagan Isabela Cowboys	72–83	Caloocan Batang Kankaloo
Scoring by quarter: 21–20, 18–26, 14–17, 19–20
Pts: Donald Gumaru, Allen Mina 14; Rebs: Arth Dela Cruz 8 Asts: Arth Dela Cruz, MJ Ayaay 5		Pts: Chris Bitoon, Kean Baclaan 17; Rebs: Kymani Ladi 11; Asts: Chris Bitoon 5
Caloocan wins series, 2–0

Caloocan Sports Complex, Caloocan
Referees: Bennette Francisco Jr., Ronn Ivan Baluyot, Emel Carace

Head-to-head matchup

Solar Sports

May 23
4:00 p.m.

Boxscore

Ilagan Isabela Cowboys	91–100	Caloocan Batang Kankaloo
Scoring by quarter: 15—34, 28—24, 24—28, 24—14
Pts: Jerie Pingoy 19; Rebs: Arthur Dela Cruz 7 Asts: Arthur Dela Cruz 9		Pts: Jeff Manday 23; Rebs: Jammer Jamito 7 Asts: Irven Palencia 5

One Arena, Cainta, Rizal
Referees: Manuel Binondo, Maynard Centeno, Alvin Sosongco

This is the first playoff meeting between Caloocan and Ilagan Isabela.

==== (4) Meycauayan Marilao Gems vs. (5) Pasay Voyagers ====
Solar Sports

October 9
5:00 p.m.

Boxscore

Meycauayan Marilao Gems	64–66 (OT)	Pasay Voyagers
Scoring by quarter: 12–16, 12–13, 18–21, 17–9, Overtime: 5–7
Pts: Agem Miranda 15; Rebs: Jayson Apolonio 17; Asts: Jimboy Pasturan, Agem Miranda 6		Pts: Christian Fajarito, Gelo Santiago 12; Rebs: Christian Fajarito 9 Asts: Christian Fajarito 3
Pasay leads series, 1–0

University of Bangued Gymnasium, Bangued, Abra
Referees: Hallyric Damicog, Jhay Francisco, Michael Quinay

Solar Sports

October 15
7:00 p.m.

Boxscore

Pasay Voyagers	53–57	Meycauayan Marilao Gems
Scoring by quarter: 13–14, 18–17, 7–11, 15–15
Pts: Cyril Gonzales 13; Rebs: Gelo Santiago 10; Asts: Cyril Gonzales 3		Pts: Agem Miranda 14; Rebs: Jayson Apolonio 13; Asts: Felix Apreku Jr, 4
Series tied, 1–1

Bulacan Capitol Gymnasium, Malolos, Bulacan
Referees: Severino Pingol Jr., Edgar Orpilla, Jhay Francisco

Solar Sports

October 19
6:00 p.m.

Boxscore

Pasay Voyagers	61–59	Meycauayan Marilao Gems
Scoring by quarter: 19–12, 13–19, 21–20, 8–8
Pts: Christian Fajarito, Cyril Gonzales 15; Rebs: Christian Fajarito 15; Asts: Agem Miranda 4		Pts: Joshua Guiab 14; Rebs: Jayson Apolonio 15; Asts: Darell Manliguez, Cyril Gonzales 3
Pasay wins series, 2–1

Bulacan Capitol Gymnasium, Malolos, Bulacan
Referees: Allan Manzano, Danilo Rivera, Eduardo Villarosa

Head-to-head matchup

Solar Sports

July 8
8:00 p.m.

Boxscore

Meycauayan Marilao Gems	82–77	Pasay Voyagers
Scoring by quarter: 20—15, 27—21, 14—23, 21—18
Pts: Shawn Argente 19; Rebs: Felix Apreku Jr. 11; Asts: Agem Miranda 7		Pts: Rence Alcoriza 26; Rebs: Rence Alcoriza, Gelo Santiago 5 Asts: Rence Alcoriza 5

Cuneta Astrodome, Pasay
Referees: J. Santiago, Bennete Francisco, S. Mina

This is the first playoff meeting between Meycauayan Marilao and Pasay.

=== South Division quarterfinals ===
==== (1) Quezon Huskers vs. (8) Zamboanga Sikat ====
Solar Sports

October 7
7:00 p.m.

Boxscore

Zamboanga Sikat	55–88	Quezon Huskers
Scoring by quarter: 17–18, 6–23, 16–26, 16–21
Pts: three players 11; Rebs: John Mahari 7 Asts: Rafael Are 4		Pts: Jolo Manansala 15; Rebs: Cholo Anonuevo 8 Asts: Cyrus Tabi 6
Quezon leads series, 1–0

Quezon Convention Center, Lucena
Referees: Michael Quinay, Hallyric Damicog, Mark Quilinguen

Solar Sports

October 14
5:00 p.m.

Boxscore

Quezon Huskers	64–67	Zamboanga Sikat
Scoring by quarter: 19–23, 14–13, 18–15, 13–16
Pts: Jason Opiso 12; Rebs: Jason Opiso 9 Asts: Cyrus Tabi 6		Pts: Forthsky Padrigao 15; Rebs: John Mahari, Brandon Wilson 8 Asts: Forthsky Padrigao 7
Series tied, 1–1

Batangas City Coliseum, Batangas City
Referees: Jay Castroverde, Edgar Orpilla, Alvin Sosongco, Edric Villarosa

Solar Sports

October 17
6:00 p.m.

Boxscore

Zamboanga Sikat	85–99	Quezon Huskers
Scoring by quarter: 18–28, 17–19, 20–28, 30–24
Pts: Brandon Wilson 23; Rebs: Brandon Wilson 9 Asts: Rafael Are 5		Pts: Joshua Yerro 22; Rebs: Jolo Manansala 8 Asts: Cyrus Tabi 5
Quezon wins series, 2–1

Quezon Convention Center, Lucena
Referees: Allan Manzano, Jay Castroverde, Ronn Ivan Baluyot, Michael Santos, Hallyric Damicog

Head-to-head matchup

Solar Sports

September 15
5:00 p.m.

Boxscore

Zamboanga Sikat	67–86	Quezon Huskers
Scoring by quarter: 16–22, 17–16, 7–22, 27–26
Pts: Levi Hernandez 14; Rebs: Brandon Wilson 7 Asts: Forthsky Padrigao 7		Pts: Joshua Yerro 15; Rebs: Jolo Manansala, Cholo Anonuevo 7 Asts: Cyrus Tabi 6

Paco Arena, Manila
Referees: Ian Borbe, Hallyric Damicog, Karina Martin

This is the second playoff meeting between Quezon and Zamboanga, with Zamboanga leads the recent all-time playoff series.

Previous playoffs series
Zamboanga 1–0 in all-time playoff series

2023

Zamboanga Family's Brand Sardines 2, Quezon Huskers 1

2023 Southern Division quarterfinals

==== (2) Biñan Tatak Gel vs. (7) Mindoro Tamaraws ====
Solar Sports

October 2
7:00 p.m.

Boxscore

Mindoro Tamaraws	70–78	Biñan Tatak Gel
Scoring by quarter: 16–16, 13–18, 18–20, 23–24
Pts: JJ Caspe 16; Rebs: JJ Caspe 9 Asts: three players 3		Pts: Nic Cabañero 23; Rebs: Nic Cabañero, Michael Mabulac 9 Asts: Pamboy Raymundo 7
Biñan leads series, 1–0

Caloocan Sports Complex, Caloocan
Referees: Jay Castroverde, E. Michael Santos, Allan Manzano

Solar Sports

October 12
5:00 p.m.

Boxscore

Biñan Tatak Gel	91–77	Mindoro Tamaraws
Scoring by quarter: 27–27, 25–17, 18–13, 21–20
Pts: Nic Cabañero 25; Rebs: Nic Cabañero 10; Asts: Pamboy Raymundo 10		Pts: Bambam Gamalinda 30; Rebs: JC Recto 11; Asts: JC Recto, Brian Heruela 4
Biñan wins series, 2–0

Paco Arena, Manila
Referees: Ian Borbe, Hallyric Damicog, Damilo Rivera, Mark Quilinguen

Head-to-head matchup

Solar Sports

May 11
6:00 p.m.

Boxscore

Biñan Tatak Gel	100–75	Mindoro Tamaraws
Scoring by quarter: 31–14, 24–18, 21–25, 24–18
Pts: Nic Cabañero, Kenny Rocacurva 19; Rebs: Nic Cabañero 10; Asts: four players 3		Pts: JJ Caspe 15; Rebs: JJ Caspe 6 Asts: JJ Caspe 5

Paco Arena, Manila
Referees: Manuel Binondo, Maynard Centeno, P. Tugab

This is the first playoff meeting between Biñan and Mindoro.

==== (3) GenSan Warriors vs. (6) Rizal Golden Coolers ====
Solar Sports

October 2
5:00 p.m.

Boxscore

GenSan Warriors	73–78	Rizal Golden Coolers
Scoring by quarter: 21–16, 11–20, 23–20, 18–22
Pts: Hesed Gabo 16; Rebs: Marwin Dionisio, Anton Eusebio 10; Asts: three players 6		Pts: Jolo Mendoza 17; Rebs: Laurenz Victoria 8 Asts: Laurenz Victoria 5
Rizal leads series, 1–0

Caloocan Sports Complex, Caloocan
Referees: Maynard Centeno, Alvin Sosongco, Michael Quinay

Solar Sports

October 12
7:00 p.m.

Boxscore

Rizal Golden Coolers	96–74	GenSan Warriors
Scoring by quarter: 23–18, 18–13, 25–19, 30–24
Pts: Laurenz Victoria 18; Rebs: Billy Ray Robles 9 Asts: Philip Manalang 6		Pts: Hesed Gabo 14; Rebs: three players 5 Asts: Hesed Gabo 6
Rizal wins series, 2–0

Paco Arena, Manila
Referees: Maynard Centeno, Edric Villarosa, Karina Martin, Mollie De Luna

Head-to-head matchup

Solar Sports

July 29
7:00 p.m.

Boxscore

GenSan Warriors	71–81	Rizal Golden Coolers
Scoring by quarter: 18–25, 13–18, 17–22, 20–16
Pts: Mark Cruz 12; Rebs: Anton Eusebio, Marwin Dionisio 7 Asts: Hesed Gabo, Anton Eusebio 5		Pts: Laurenz Victoria, Jolo Mendoza 13; Rebs: Billy Robles 11; Asts: three players 3

Ynares Center Montalban, Rodriguez, Rizal
Referees: Ronn Ivan Baluyot, Emel Carace, S. Mina

This is the first playoff meeting between General Santos and Rizal.

==== (4) Batangas City Athletics vs. (5) Cebu Greats ====
Solar Sports

October 7
5:00 p.m.

Boxscore

Batangas City Athletics	77–78	Cebu Greats
Scoring by quarter: 18–22, 18–22, 19–15, 22–19
Pts: Rhinwil Yambing 23; Rebs: Cedric Ablaza 10; Asts: CJ Isit 7		Pts: Jun Manzo 21; Rebs: Mark Meneses 10; Asts: Andrey Armenion 5
Cebu leads series, 1–0

Quezon Convention Center, Lucena
Referees: Edgar Orpilla, Jhay Francisco, Ronn Ivan Baluyot

Solar Sports

October 14
7:00 p.m.

Boxscore

Cebu Greats	70–67	Batangas City Athletics
Scoring by quarter: 21–18, 11–12, 12–20, 26–17
Pts: Limuel Tampus 14; Rebs: Mark Meneses 16; Asts: Ron Dennison, Ichie Altamirano 3		Pts: Wendelino Comboy 15; Rebs: Cedric Ablaza 12; Asts: Wendelino Comboy 4
Cebu wins series, 2–0

Batangas City Coliseum, Batangas City
Referees: Maynard Centeno, Ian Borbe, Mollie De Luna, Rowen Inductivo

Head-to-head matchup

Solar Sports

April 22
6:00 p.m.

Boxscore

Batangas City Athletics	83–84	Cebu Greats
Scoring by quarter: 19–26, 23–16, 25–25, 17–16
Pts: Jhan Nermal 18; Rebs: Mark Niel Cruz 9 Asts: Wendelino Comboy 6		Pts: Paul Desiderio 21; Rebs: Mark Meneses 11; Asts: Brian Heruela 6

Cuneta Astrodome, Pasay
Referees: Lester Arcega, Jhay Francisco, C. Martin

This is the first playoff meeting between Batangas City and Cebu.

== Division semifinals ==
NOTE: All times are Philippine Standard Time (UTC+8:00).

Note: Potential games are marked by an asterisk if necessary.

=== North Division semifinals ===
==== (1) Abra Weavers vs. (5) Pasay Voyagers ====
Solar Sports

October 24
7:00 p.m.

Boxscore

Pasay Voyagers	71–81	Abra Weavers
Scoring by quarter: 17–18, 10–26, 20–19, 24–18
Pts: Bryan Hilario 15; Rebs: Edmund Dela Cruz 7 Asts: Darell Manliguez, King Gurtiza 4		Pts: Dave Ildefonso 14; Rebs: Mike Ayonayon, John Uduba 6 Asts: Dave Ildefonso 7
Abra leads series, 1–0

Ynares Sports Arena, Pasig City
Referees: Jay Castroverde, Alvin Sosongco, Ronn Ivan Baluyot, Rowen Inductivo, Maynard Centeno

Solar Sports

October 28
5:00 p.m.

[ Boxscore]

Abra Weavers	77–69	Pasay Voyagers
Scoring by quarter: 23–23, 22–11, 19–19, 13–16
Pts: Dave Ildefonso 23; Rebs: Jake Figueroa 9 Asts: Tucker Molina, Jake Figueroa 4		Pts: Christian Fajarito 12; Rebs: Steve Nash Enriquez 11; Asts: Steve Nash Enriquez 8
Abra wins series, 2–0

Ynares Center Montalban, Rodriguez, Rizal
Referees: Ian Borbe, Jay Francisco, Ronn Ivan Baluyot, Maynard Centeno, Michael Santos

Head-to-head matchup

Solar Sports

July 3
8:00 p.m.

Boxscore

Abra Weavers	68–51	Pasay Voyagers
Scoring by quarter: 18–10, 11–15, 19–10, 20–16
Pts: three players 11; Rebs: John Uduba 11; Asts: Mike Ayonayon 6		Pts: Lean Martel 8 Rebs: Christian Fajarito 8 Asts: Steve Nash Enriquez 3

Cuneta Astrodome, Pasay City

This is the first playoff meeting between Abra and Pasay.

==== (2) San Juan Knights vs. (3) Caloocan Batang Kankaloo ====
Solar Sports

October 24
5:00 p.m.

Boxscore

San Juan Knights	73–71 (OT)	Caloocan Batang Kankaloo
Scoring by quarter: 15–19, 20–19, 24–19, 6–8, Overtime: 8–6
Pts: Terrence Fortea, Harold Alarcon 11; Rebs: JP Borla 9 Asts: Harold Alarcon 5		Pts: Kymani Ladi 14; Rebs: Jeff Manday 9 Asts: Jeff Manday 9
San Juan leads series, 1–0

Ynares Sports Arena, Pasig City
Referees: Allan Manzano, Hallyric Damicog, Severino Pingol Jr., Rafael Del Mar, Michael Quinay

Solar Sports

October 28
7:00 p.m.

[ Boxscore]

Caloocan Batang Kankaloo	78–82 (OT)	San Juan Knights
Scoring by quarter: 16–16, 16–24, 15–10, 23–20, Overtime: 8–12
Pts: Kymani Ladi 21; Rebs: Jeff Manday 15; Asts: Kean Baclaan 5		Pts: AC Soberano 15; Rebs: Harold Alarcon 9 Asts: Harold Alarcon 7
San Juan wins series, 2–0

Ynares Center Montalban, Rodriguez, Rizal
Referees: Alvin Sosongco, Fevyboy Galiga, Danilo Rivera, Richard Carpio, Edmar Avis

Head-to-head matchup

Solar Sports

June 10
8:00 p.m.

Boxscore

San Juan Knights	68–60	Caloocan Batang Kankaloo
Scoring by quarter: 16–19, 21–15, 19–12, 12–14
Pts: Orlan Wamar Jr. 15; Rebs: Mike Phillips 15; Asts: Orlan Wamar Jr. 8		Pts: Kean Baclaan 16; Rebs: Kean Baclaan 7 Asts: three players 3

Caloocan Sports Complex, Caloocan
Referees: Lester Arcega, Hallyric Damicog, Alvin Sosongco

This is the second playoff meeting between San Juan and Caloocan, with San Juan leads the recent all-time playoff series.

Previous playoffs series
San Juan leads 1–0 in all-time playoff series

2024

San Juan Knights 2, Caloocan Batang Kankaloo 0

2024 Northern Division semifinals

=== South Division semifinals ===
==== (1) Quezon Huskers vs. (5) Cebu Greats ====
Solar Sports

October 21
7:00 p.m.

Boxscore

Cebu Greats	67–77	Quezon Huskers
Scoring by quarter: 14–23, 22–21, 13–17, 18–16
Pts: Mark Meneses 27; Rebs: Simon Camacho, Mark Meneses 10; Asts: Dhon Reverente 3		Pts: Alvin Abundo, Christian Pagaran 11; Rebs: Cholo Anonuevo 10; Asts: Cyrus Tabi 9
Quezon leads series, 1–0

Quezon Convention Center, Lucena
Attendance: 6,433
Referees: Edmar Avis, Maynard Centeno, Jhay Francisco, Edric Villarosa, Fevy Boy Galiga

Solar Sports

October 27
5:00 p.m.

Boxscore

Quezon Huskers	83–55	Cebu Greats
Scoring by quarter: 16–18, 19–20, 21–13, 27–4
Pts: Judel Fuentes 20; Rebs: Cholo Anonuevo 13; Asts: Cyrus Tabi 7		Pts: Edmar Echavez 9 Rebs: Simon Camacho 12; Asts: Ichie Altamirano, Mark Meneses 4
Quezon wins series, 2–0

Alonte Sports Arena, Biñan, Laguna
Referees: Ian Borbe, Hallyric Damicog, Jhay Francisco, Edgar Orpilla, Michael Quinay

Head-to-head matchup

Solar Sports

August 3
5:00 p.m.

Boxscore

Cebu Greats	80–79	Quezon Huskers
Scoring by quarter: 13–22, 24–26, 28–17, 15–14
Pts: Alfrancis Tamsi 25; Rebs: Mark Meneses 14; Asts: Andrey Armenion 9		Pts: Cedrick Manzano 17; Rebs: Cedrick Manzano 8 Asts: Cyrus Tabi 7

Mandaluyong City College of Science and Technology Gym, Mandaluyong
Referees: Alvin Sosongco, J. Santiago Jr., A. Mamaril

This is the first playoff meeting between Quezon and Cebu.

==== (2) Biñan Tatak Gel vs. (6) Rizal Golden Coolers ====
Solar Sports

October 21
5:00 p.m.

Boxscore

Biñan Tatak Gel	72–70	Rizal Golden Coolers
Scoring by quarter: 26–18, 10–13, 16–20, 20–19
Pts: Nic Cabañero 20; Rebs: Kenny Rocacurva 11; Asts: Pamboy Raymundo, Kenny Rocacurva 4		Pts: Jolo Mendoza 18; Rebs: Jake Gaspay 8 Asts: Laurenz Victoria 6
Biñan leads series, 1–0

Quezon Convention Center, Lucena
Referees: Jay Castroverde, Ian Borbe, Alvin Sosongco, Ronn Ivan Baluyot, Edgar Orpilla

Solar Sports

October 27
7:00 p.m.

Boxscore

Rizal Golden Coolers	67–81	Biñan Tatak Gel
Scoring by quarter: 13–19, 21–10, 14–27, 19–25
Pts: Billy Ray Robles 14; Rebs: Laurenz Victoria 8 Asts: Joel Lee Yu 6		Pts: Nic Cabañero 32; Rebs: Kenny Rocacurva 11; Asts: Pamboy Raymundo 13
Biñan wins series, 2–0

Alonte Sports Arena, Biñan, Laguna
Referees: Jay Castroverde, Allan Manzano, Ronn Ivan Baluyot, Mark Quilinguen, Michael Santos

Head-to-head matchup

Solar Sports

August 31
7:00 p.m.

Boxscore

Biñan Tatak Gel	65–61	Rizal Golden Coolers
Scoring by quarter: 20–10, 12–19, 17–14, 16–18
Pts: Nic Cabañero 14; Rebs: Nic Cabañero 14; Asts: Pamboy Raymundo 4		Pts: Mark Yee 10; Rebs: Mark Yee 10; Asts: Joel Lee Yu 4

Ynares Center Montalban, Rodriguez, Rizal
Referees: Allan Manzano, Michael Quinay, Zen Manansala

This is the second playoff meeting between Biñan and Rizal, with Biñan leads the recent all-time playoff series.

Previous playoffs series
Biñan leads 1–0 in all-time playoff series

2025

Biñan Tatak Gel 2, Rizal Golden Coolers 0

2025 Southern Division quarterfinals

== Division finals ==
NOTE: All times are Philippine Standard Time (UTC+8:00).

Note: Potential games are marked by an asterisk if necessary.

=== North Division ===
==== (1) Abra Weavers vs. (2) San Juan Knights ====
Solar Sports

November 7
6:30 p.m.

Boxscore

San Juan Knights	58–59	Abra Weavers
Scoring by quarter: 15–15, 16–11, 14–25, 13–8
Pts: Michael Calisaan 12; Rebs: Harold Alarcon 8 Asts: Patrick Sleat, Royce Alforque 5		Pts: Encho Serrano, DJ Fenner 11; Rebs: Drex delos Reyes 8 Asts: Mike Ayonayon 4
Abra leads series, 1–0

University of Bangued Gymnasium, Bangued, Abra
Referees: Jhay Francisco, Ronn Ivan Baluyot, Fevy Boy Caliga, Danilo Rivera, Mark Quiliguen

Solar Sports

November 9
6:30 p.m.

Boxscore

San Juan Knights	65–76	Abra Weavers
Scoring by quarter: 12–16, 16–19, 9–19, 28–22
Pts: Michael Calisaan 20; Rebs: four players 7 Asts: Royce Alforque 6		Pts: DJ Fenner 20; Rebs: Dave Ildefonso 11; Asts: JD Cagulangan 6
Abra leads series, 2–0

University of Bangued Gymnasium, Bangued, Abra
Referees: Maynard Centeno, Michael Quinay, Mark Quilinguen, Edric Villarosa, Jay Francisco

Solar Sports

November 14
6:30 p.m.

Boxscore

Abra Weavers	76–68	San Juan Knights
Scoring by quarter: 18–13, 23–17, 16–16, 19–22
Pts: Dave Ildefonso, Jake Figueroa 17; Rebs: three players 9 Asts: Dave Ildefonso 4		Pts: three players 11; Rebs: Michael Calisaan, Orlan Wamar Jr., 6 Asts: Orlan Wamar Jr. 6
Abra wins series, 3–0

Playtime Filoil Centre, San Juan
Referees: Allan Manzano, Jay Castroverde, Hallyric Damicog, Maynard Centeno, Alvin Sosongco

Head-to-head matchup

Solar Sports

May 2
8:00 p.m.

Boxscore

Abra Weavers	58–66	San Juan Knights
Scoring by quarter: 12–14, 12–13, 11–13, 23–26
Pts: DJ Fenner 18; Rebs: Raven Gonzales 10; Asts: Drex Delos Reyes, DJ Fenner 2		Pts: Aldrech Ramos 12; Rebs: Mike Phillips 11; Asts: Harold Alarcon 6

Playtime Filoil Centre, San Juan
Referees: Hallyric Damicog, Zen Manansala, Mark Quilinguen

This is the first playoff meeting between Abra and San Juan.

=== South Division ===
==== (1) Quezon Huskers vs. (2) Biñan Tatak Gel ====
Solar Sports

November 3
6:30 p.m.

Boxscore

Biñan Tatak Gel	83–74	Quezon Huskers
Scoring by quarter: 18–12, 17–22, 21–26, 27–14
Pts: Nic Cabañero 16; Rebs: Nic Cabañero 10; Asts: Pamboy Raymundo 6		Pts: Cholo Anonuevo 14; Rebs: Cedrick Manzano 15; Asts: Cyrus Tabi 9
Biñan leads series, 1–0

Ynares Sports Arena, Pasig City
Referees: Jay Castroverde, Maynard Centeno, Edric Villarosa, Jay Francisco, Hallyric Damicog

After trailing 60–65 with 7:32 left in the fourth quarter, Biñan went on a 20–2 run to lead 80–67 and cruise to a Game 1 win.

Solar Sports

November 5
6:30 p.m.

Boxscore

Biñan Tatak Gel	54–74	Quezon Huskers
Scoring by quarter: 11–16, 19–17, 16–25, 8–16
Pts: Nic Cabañero 15; Rebs: Kenny Rocacurva 6 Asts: Pamboy Raymundo, Kenny Rocacurva 3		Pts: Alvin Abundo 14; Rebs: Cholo Anonuevo 9 Asts: Cyrus Tabi, Judel Fuentes 3
Series tied, 1–1

Quezon Convention Center, Lucena
Referees: Allan Manzano, Alvin Sosongco, Mark Quiliguen, Ian Borbe, Ronn Ivan Baluyot

Solar Sports

November 11
6:30 p.m.

Boxscore

Quezon Huskers	81–67	Biñan Tatak Gel
Scoring by quarter: 24–14, 20–23, 25–22, 12–8
Pts: Judel Fuentes 15; Rebs: Jolo Manansala 10; Asts: Cyrus Tabi 18		Pts: Nic Cabañero 19; Rebs: Nic Cabañero 8 Asts: Nic Cabañero 5
Quezon leads series, 2–1

Alonte Sports Arena, Biñan, Laguna
Referees: Ian Borbe, Maynard Centeno, Edric Villarosa, Edgar Orpilla, Michael Quinay

Solar Sports

November 13
6:30 p.m.

Boxscore

Quezon Huskers	69–68	Biñan Tatak Gel
Scoring by quarter: 23–20, 18–11, 13–4, 15–33
Pts: Christian Pagaran 12; Rebs: Jason Opiso 8 Asts: Cyrus Tabi 7		Pts: Nic Cabañero 27; Rebs: Nic Cabañero 14; Asts: Nic Cabañero, Marc Pingris 3
Quezon wins series, 3–1

Alonte Sports Arena, Biñan, Laguna
Referees: Hallyric Damicog, Richard Carpio, Karina Martin, Alvin Sosongco, Allan Manzano

Head-to-head matchup

Solar Sports

April 21
4:00 p.m.

Boxscore

Quezon Huskers	66–59	Biñan Tatak Gel
Scoring by quarter: 12–12, 19–17, 17–15, 18–15
Pts: Michael Cañete 14; Rebs: Will McAloney 7 Asts: Cyrus Tabi 8		Pts: Nic Cabañero 16; Rebs: Kenny Rocacurva 7 Asts: Michael Mabulac 3

Caloocan Sports Complex, Caloocan
Referees: Benjie Estroga, Rodel Brila, R. Cay

This is the second playoff meeting between Quezon and Biñan, with Quezon leads the recent all-time playoff series.

Previous playoffs series
Quezon leads 1–0 in all-time playoff series

2025

Quezon Huskers 3, Biñan Tatak Gel 2

2025 Southern Division finals
