= 2026 MPBL season =

8th season of the Maharlika Pilipinas Basketball League

- League: Maharlika Pilipinas Basketball League
- Sport: Basketball
- Duration: Regular season: April 10 – September 22, 2026; Play-in tournament: September 25 – 30, 2026; Playoffs: October 2 – November 14, 2026; Finals: November 24 – December 16, 2026
- Games: 351 (total); 26 (per team)
- Teams: 28 (26 after disqualifications)
- TV partner(s): Solar Sports; TAP Sports
- Streaming partner(s): Facebook; YouTube; Blast TV

Regular season
- Top seed: Abra Weavers

Playoffs

Finals

MPBL seasons
- ← 2025 2027 →

The 2026 MPBL season is the eighth season of the Maharlika Pilipinas Basketball League (MPBL) and fifth as a professional league. The season began on April 10.

The league contracted to 28 teams this season, down from 30 in 2025. This will also be the first season with Kenneth Duremdes as league president and Emmerson Oreta league commissioner. SportsPlus will be the title sponsor for this season.

== League changes ==
=== Leadership changes ===
On January 17, 2026, the league underwent its first significant leadership change since beginning play in 2018. After eight years as commissioner of the MPBL, Kenneth Duremdes transitioned into a new role as league president. In his place, former head of operations Emmerson Oreta was appointed as the league's third commissioner.

=== Format changes ===
The MPBL finals is being expanded to a best-of-seven series, continuing the league's postseason expansion from the previous season.

== Teams ==
=== Team changes ===
This season will feature one expansion team, the Meycauayan Marilao Gems, who will replace the Muntinlupa Cagers. Two returning team are also confirmed in the Iloilo United Royals and the Negros Hacienderos (formerly the Negros Muscovados). On the other hand, four teams departed from the league, which includes three former champions: Davao Occidental Tigers, Nueva Ecija Rice Vanguards and Pampanga Giant Lanterns. Alongside the aforementioned Muntinlupa, the Pangasinan Heatwaves are the other departure from this season.

A number of returning teams have also changed their names:

| Old name | New name(s) |
|---|---|
| Bacolod Tubo Slashers | Bacolod Masskara |
| Batangas City Tanduay Rum Masters | Batangas City Athletics |
| Basilan Starhorse | Basilan Steel |
| Imus Braderhood | Imus Bandera |
| Negros Muscovados | Negros Hacienderos |
| Quezon City Galeries Taipan | Quezon City Black Bulls |
| Sarangani Gripper Motorcycle Tires | Sarangani Marlins |
| Val City Magic | Valenzuela City Darkhorse |

== Transactions ==
=== Coaching changes ===
Off-season changes
| Team | Departing coach | Incoming coach |
|---|---|---|
| Bacolod Masskara | Paolo Javelona | Lency Aransazo |
| Basilan Steel | Rich Alvarez | Arnold Oliveros |
| Bulacan Kuyas | Terence Reyes | Allan Salangsang |
| Caloocan Batang Kankaloo | Myk Saguiguit | Jerson Cabiltes |
| Cebu Greats | Junthy Valenzuela | Aldrin Morante |
| Imus Bandera | Britt Reroma | Michael Calomot |
| Iloilo United Royals | —N/a | Sherwin Cantos |
| Parañaque Patriots | Melquiades Villanueva | JR Villanueva |
| Pasig City | Aldrin Morante | Ryan De Ramos |
| Rizal Golden Coolers | Ralph Emerson Rivera | Mark Dandan |
| Quezon City Black Bulls | Jeff Perlas | Javy Olea |
| Sarangani Marlins | Ronnie Dojillo | John Kallos |
| Valenzuela City Darkhorse | Raymond Valenzona | Estong Ballesteros |
| Zamboanga Sikat | Bong Ramos | John Sia |

Mid-season changes
| Team | Departing coach | Incoming coach |
|---|---|---|
| Imus Bandera | Michael Calomot | Albert Rabe |
| Iloilo United Royals | Sherwin Cantos | RJ Patricio |
| Mindoro Tamaraws | Bengie Teodoro | Edgar Macaraya |
| Rizal Golden Coolers | Mark Dandan | Don Dulay |
| Pasig City | Ryan De Ramos | Arvin Guinto |
| Sarangani Marlins | John Kallos | Gilbert Cole |
| Zamboanga Sikat | John Sia | JR Carlos |

== Playing venues ==
=== Arena changes ===
- The Bulacan Kuyas returned to its primary home venues in Baliwag Star Arena in Baliwag, Bulacan, Malolos Sports & Convention Center, and Bulacan Capitol Gymnasium both in Malolos, Bulacan. Bulacan played in Baliwag for the first time since 2023, while they returned to both Malolos venues for the first time since the 2019-20 season.
- The Victory Coliseum in San Rafael, Bulacan became a new alternative venue for the Bulacan Kuyas.
- The Novadeci Convention Center became a new alternative venue for the Quezon City Black Bulls.
- The San Jose del Monte Sports Complex in San Jose del Monte, Bulacan became the primary home venue of the Meycauayan Marilao Gems.
- The Polomolok Gymnasium in Polomolok, South Cotabato became the alternate venue for the GenSan Warriors.
- The Camaya Coast Events Place Center in Mariveles, Bataan became a new alternate venue for the Bataan Risers.
- The Calapan City Coliseum in Calapan, Oriental Mindoro became a new alternate venue for the Mindoro Tamaraws.

=== Regular arenas ===
New venues for this season are indicated with bold text.

| Abra Solid North Weavers | Bataan Risers | | | Batangas City Athletics |
|---|---|---|---|---|
| University of Abra (Gov. Andres B. Bernos Memorial Gymnasium); Bangued, Abra | Bataan People's Center; Balanga, Bataan | Camaya Coast (Camaya Coast Events Place Center); Mariveles, Bataan | Orion Sports Complex; Orion, Bataan | Batangas City Coliseum; Batangas City, Batangas |
| Capacity: 2,000 | Capacity: 4,000 | Capacity: N/A | Capacity: 2,000 | Capacity: 4,000 |

| Biñan Tatak Gel | Bulacan Kuyas | | | Caloocan Batang Kankaloo |
|---|---|---|---|---|
| Alonte Sports Arena; Biñan, Laguna | Baliwag Star Arena; Baliwag, Bulacan | Malolos Sports & Convention Center; Malolos, Bulacan | Victory Coliseum; San Rafael, Bulacan | Caloocan Sports Complex; Caloocan |
| Capacity: 6,500 | Capacity: 5,000 | Capacity: 5,000 | Capacity: N/A | Capacity: 3,000 |

| Cebu Greats | | GenSan Warriors | Ilagan Isabela Cowboys | Manila Batang Quiapo |
|---|---|---|---|---|
| Cebu Coliseum; Cebu City | Hoops Dome; Lapu-Lapu City | Polomolok Gymnasium; Polomolok, South Cotabato | Capital Arena; Ilagan, Isabela | Paco Arena; Manila |
| Capacity: 5,000 | Capacity: 4,600 | Capacity: 6,000 | Capacity: 10,000 | Capacity: 1,000 |

| Meycauayan Marilao Gems | | Mindoro Tamaraws | | Parañaque Patriots |
|---|---|---|---|---|
| Bulacan Capitol Gymnasium; Malolos, Bulacan | San Jose del Monte Sports Complex; San Jose del Monte, Bulacan | Calapan City Coliseum; Calapan, Oriental Mindoro | Pola Gymnasium; Pola, Oriental Mindoro | Olivarez College (Olivarez College Gymnasium); Parañaque |
| Capacity: 3,000 | Capacity: 5,000 | Capacity: 3,500 | Capacity: N/A | Capacity: 3,500 |

| Pasay Voyagers | Pasig City MPBL team | Quezon Huskers | Quezon City Black Bulls | Rizal Golden Coolers |
|---|---|---|---|---|
| Cuneta Astrodome; Pasay | Ynares Sports Arena; Pasig | Quezon Convention Center; Lucena | Novadeci Convention Center; Quezon City | One Arena; Cainta, Rizal |
| Capacity: 12,000 | Capacity: 3,000 | Capacity: 7,000 | Capacity: 2,000 | Capacity: 3,000 |

| Rizal Golden Coolers | San Juan Knights |
|---|---|
| Ynares Center Montalban; Rodriguez, Rizal | Playtime Filoil Centre; San Juan |
| Capacity: 8,000 | Capacity: 6,000 |

=== Other arenas ===
Neutral
| Strike Gymnasium; Bacoor, Cavite | Villar Coliseum; Las Piñas | Mandaluyong City College of Science and Technology (MCST Gymnasium); Mandaluyong | San Andres Sports Complex; Manila | Navotas Convention Center; Navotas |
| Capacity: 1,500 | Capacity: 4,000 | Capacity: N/A | Capacity: 3,000 | Capacity: 2,633 |

Neutral
Quezon City District 2 Gymnasium
(MRB Gymnasium)
Quezon City
Capacity: 2,000

== Preseason ==
After a hiatus in 2025, the MPBL Preseason Invitational returned in 2026, this time with sixteen teams competing. The tournament ran from February 7 to March 21, 2026 and saw the Abra Weavers win the tournament. The Quezon Huskers finished as runners-up.

== Regular season ==
The regular season opened on April 10. Unlike previous seasons, the season opener will be split into two, with a team from each division hosting a doubleheader of games in their respective home arenas. The North Division season opener will be hosted by the Caloocan Batang Kankaloo at Caloocan Sports Complex while the South Division opener will be hosted by Biñan Tatak Gel at Alonte Sports Arena in Biñan, Laguna.

The regular season will follow the traditional round-robin tournament format. Each team will play 27 games, one against each team.

=== Standings ===
North Division

| Pos | Team | Pld | W | L | GB |
|---|---|---|---|---|---|
| 1 | z – Abra Weavers | 25 | 23 | 2 | — |
| 2 | x – San Juan Knights | 25 | 22 | 3 | 1 |
| 3 | x – Caloocan Batang Kankaloo | 25 | 20 | 5 | 3 |
| 4 | x – Meycauayan Marilao Gems | 25 | 14 (Note: Meycauayan Marilao wins tiebreaker over Pasay based on head-to-head match-up.) | 11 | 9 |
| 5 | x – Pasay Voyagers | 25 | 14 | 11 | 9 |
| 6 | x – Ilagan Isabela Cowboys | 25 | 13 | 12 | 10 |
| 7 | x – Bataan Risers | 25 | 11 (Note: Bataan (1.049) wins tiebreaker over Pasig (1.028), and Quezon City (0.927) based on head-to-head point quotient.) | 14 | 12 |
| 8 | p – Pasig City | 25 | 11 | 14 | 12 |
| 9 | x – Quezon City Black Bulls | 25 | 11 | 14 | 12 |
| 10 | p – Valenzuela City Darkhorse | 25 | 10 | 15 | 13 |
| 11 | o – Bulacan Kuyas | 25 | 6 (Note: Bulacan wins tiebreaker over Marikina based on head-to-head match-up.) | 19 | 17 |
| 12 | o – Marikina Shoemasters | 25 | 6 | 19 | 17 |
| 13 | o – Parañaque Patriots | 25 | 2 | 23 | 21 |
| 14 | o – Manila Batang Quiapo | 25 | 1 | 24 | 22 |

Source: Standings
Rules for classification: 1) Wins; 2a) If two teams are tied, head-to-head match-up; 2b) If three or more teams are tied, head-to-head point quotient; 3) overall point quotient; 4) coin toss.
o – Eliminated from postseason contention; p – Clinched play-in berth, but failed to reach playoffs; x – Clinched playoff berth; z – Clinched best record in league
Notes:

South Division

| Pos | Team | Pld | W | L | GB |
|---|---|---|---|---|---|
| 1 | y – Quezon Huskers | 25 | 21 (Note: Quezon wins tiebreaker over Biñan based on head-to-head match-up.) | 4 | — |
| 2 | x – Biñan Tatak Gel | 25 | 21 | 4 | — |
| 3 | x – GenSan Warriors | 25 | 19 (Note: General Santos (1.051) wins tiebreaker over Batangas City (1.013), and Cebu (0.942) based on head-to-head point quotient.) | 6 | 2 |
| 4 | x – Batangas City Athletics | 25 | 19 | 6 | 2 |
| 5 | x – Cebu Greats | 25 | 19 | 6 | 2 |
| 6 | x – Rizal Golden Coolers | 25 | 16 | 9 | 5 |
| 7 | x – Mindoro Tamaraws | 25 | 13 (Note: Mindoro wins tiebreaker over Basilan based on head-to-head match-up.) | 12 | 8 |
| 8 | p – Basilan Steel | 25 | 13 | 12 | 8 |
| 9 | x – Zamboanga Sikat | 25 | 11 | 14 | 10 |
| 10 | p – Imus Bandera | 25 | 4 | 21 | 17 |
| 11 | o – Sarangani Marlins | 25 | 3 | 22 | 18 |
| 12 | o – Negros Hacienderos | 25 | 2 | 23 | 19 |
| DQ | ~~Bacolod Masskara~~ (Note: The Bacolod Masskaras were disqualified by the league due to the team's allegation of game manipulation.) | 0 | ~~3~~ | ~~19~~ | 8.5 |
| DQ | ~~Iloilo United Royals~~ (Note: The Iloilo United Royals were disqualified by the league due to the team's failure to comply with financial obligations.) | 0 | ~~2~~ | ~~12~~ | 8.5 |

Source: Standings
Rules for classification: 1) Wins; 2a) If two teams are tied, head-to-head match-up; 2b) If three or more teams are tied, head-to-head point quotient; 3) overall point quotient; 4) coin toss.
o – Eliminated from postseason contention; p – Clinched play-in berth, but failed to reach playoffs; x – Clinched playoff berth; y – Clinched best record in division

=== Results table ===
| Team | Game | | | | | | | | | | | | | | | | | | | | | | | | | | |
| Team | 1 | 2 | 3 | 4 | 5 | 6 | 7 | 8 | 9 | 10 | 11 | 12 | 13 | 14 | 15 | 16 | 17 | 18 | 19 | 20 | 21 | 22 | 23 | 24 | 25 | 26 | 27 |
|---|---|---|---|---|---|---|---|---|---|---|---|---|---|---|---|---|---|---|---|---|---|---|---|---|---|---|---|
| Abra (ABR) | PAR; 115–81 | BTG; 98–91 | SJ ^{(A)} 58–66 | MAR; 89–53 | IMS; 113–75 | SAR; 105–79 | ZAM; 71–60 | MNL ^{(A)} 114–77 | GS; 107–94 | NEG; 122–81 | MYM; 101–75 | QZN; 82–77 | BAS; 111–70 | PSY ^{(A)} 68–51 | RZL ^{(H)} 89–60 | ~~BCD~~; ~~129–45~~ | MDR; 97–81 | PSG; 130–76 | BIÑ ^{(A)} 63–53 | BAN; 74–71 | BUL; 110–84 | VAL; 106–70 | QC; 79–51 | CEB; 70–74 | ILA; 94–67 | CAL; 81–59 | ILO; No game |
| ~~Bacolod~~ (BCD) | ~~IMS~~; ~~111–105~~ | ~~SAR~~; ~~94–96~~ | ~~MNL~~; ~~67–73~~ | ~~GS~~; ~~77–108~~ | ~~QC~~; ~~83–93~~ | ~~CAL~~; ~~52–99~~ | ~~QZN~~; ~~61–113~~ | ~~SJ~~; ~~85–128~~ | ~~PAR~~; ~~86–85~~ | ~~BTG~~; ~~78–111~~ | ~~NEG~~; ~~99–87~~ | ~~RZL~~; ~~72–107~~ | ~~PSG~~; ~~84–96~~ | ~~BAN~~; ~~62–113~~ | ~~VAL~~; ~~80–92~~ | ~~PSY~~; ~~74–100~~ | ~~ZAM~~; ~~80–117~~ | ~~ILA~~; ~~90–107~~ | ~~CEB~~; ~~67–97~~ | ~~MAR~~; ~~100–107~~ | ~~ABR~~; ~~45–129~~ | ~~BUL~~; ~~64–100~~ | BAS; No game | BIÑ; No game | MDR; No game | MYM; No game | ILO; No game |
| Basilan (BAS) | VAL; 99–86 | ILA; 56–57 | PSY ^{(A)} 82–76* | CEB; 80–75 | BIN ^{(A)} 70–80 | PSG; 73–75 | BUL; 88–78 | MDR; 75–83 | RZL ^{(A)} 76–73 | SJ; 79–97 | BAN ^{(A)} 84–109 | QC; 80–83 | GS; 82–79 | IMS; 98–88 | ABR; 70–111 | ZAM; 74–82 | MAR; 106–93 | BTG; 71–87 | SAR; 93–86 | CAL; 71–103 | MNL; 102–89 | PAR; 75–74 | NEG; 97–86 | QZN; 76–97 | MYM; 81–76 | ILO; No game | BCD; No game |
| Bataan (BAN) | ~~ILO~~; ~~92–82~~ | VAL ^{(H)} 75–63 | BUL ^{(H)} 102–68 | PSY ^{(A)} 78–93 | CEB; 84–91 | PSG; 91–97* | BIÑ ^{(H)} 79–89 | MDR; 81–83 | MYM; 69–75 | RZL ^{(H)} 93–100 | BAS ^{(H)} 109–84 | ~~BCD~~; ~~113–62~~ | CAL; 81–100 | QC; 103–88 | SJ; 95–102 | IMS; 98–50 | ILA; 76–80 | QZN; 73–86 | PAR ^{(H)} 139–88 | NEG ^{(H)} 114–82 | MNL; 110–97 | ABR; 71–74 | SAR; 90–73 | ZAM ^{(H)} 87–94 | BTG ^{(A)} 65–63 | MAR; 99–78 | GS ^{(H)} 89–96 |
| Batangas City (BTG) | ILA ^{(H)} 82–68 | BUL; 85–75 | CEB; 83–84 | ABR; 91–98 | PSG ^{(H)} 98–68 | BIÑ; 73–60 | PAR; 91–53 | MAR ^{(H)} 79–62 | ~~BCD~~; ~~111–78~~ | MDR; 77–71 | ~~ILO~~; ~~102–67~~ | NEG; 119–92 | SAR ^{(H)} 111–64 | QZN ^{(A)} 65–62 | MYM ^{(H)} 75–61 | VAL ^{(H)} 91–83 | BAS; 87–71 | RZL ^{(H)} 76–66 | PSY ^{(A)} 67–85 | ZAM; 72–62 | IMS ^{(H)} 88–80 | SJ ^{(H)} 71–78 | BAN ^{(H)} 63–65 | MNL ^{(A)} 126–74 | QC; 70–54 | CAL; 63–79 | GS ^{(H)} 76–73 |
| Biñan (BIÑ) | GS ^{(H)} 67–71 | QC; 75–63 | QZN; 59–66 | NEG; 72–64 | BAS ^{(H)} 80–70 | BTG; 60–73 | MDR; 100–75 | BAN ^{(A)} 89–79 | IMS ^{(H)} 131–76 | SAR; 103–84 | ~~ILO~~; ~~114–64~~ | MAR; 103–73 | ZAM; 72–53 | MYM; 70–64 | PSY ^{(A)} 77–74 | BUL; 95–75 | MNL; 129–85 | CEB ^{(A)} 78–77 | ILA; 90–69 | VAL; 102–74 | ABR ^{(H)} 53–63 | PAR; 110–86 | SJ ^{(H)} 71–64 | RZL ^{(A)} 65–61 | CAL; 20–0 | PSG ^{(H)} 121–79 | BCD; No game |
| Bulacan (BUL) | PAR; 102–96 | BTG; 75–85 | BAN ^{(A)} 68–102 | IMS ^{(H)} 85–86 | SAR; 80–76 | BAS; 78–88 | MNL ^{(H)} 85–78 | QC ^{(A)} 83–92 | CAL ^{(H)} 84–91 | ZAM; 73–83 | NEG; 83–70 | ILA; 78–82 | CEB; 80–85* | RZL; 70–84 | BIÑ; 75–95 | PSY ^{(A)} 84–89 | QZN ^{(H)} 63–88 | ~~BCD~~; ~~100–64~~ | VAL; 82–87 | MDR; 79–97 | PSG; 110–105* | ABR; 84–110 | MYM; 80–91 | SJ; 67–120 | MAR; 84–77 | GS ^{(H)} 82–102 | ILO; No game |
| Caloocan (CAL) | QC ^{(H)} 89–63 | RZL ^{(A)} 68–65 | NEG ^{(H)} 77–49 | MYM ^{(A)} 97–79 | MAR; 84–71 | ~~BCD~~; ~~99–52~~ | ~~ILO ^{(H)}~~; ~~121–49~~ | VAL ^{(H)} 97–58 | ILA; 100–91 | BUL ^{(A)} 91–84 | PSY ^{(A)} 82–74 | SJ ^{(H)} 60–68 | MDR; 91–88* | BAN; 100–81 | MNL; 130–91 | PAR; 127–91 | QZN ^{(H)} 67–72 | IMS; 122–90 | CEB ^{(A)} 89–76 | BAS; 103–71 | SAR; 113–83 | GS ^{(H)} 82–85 | PSG ^{(H)} 96–87 | BIÑ; 0–20 | ABR; 59–81 | BTG; 79–63 | ZAM; 82–78 |
| Cebu (CEB) | RZL; 81–65 | SJ; 73–81 | BTG; 84–83 | BAS; 75–80 | BAN; 91–84 | IMS; 91–77 | SAR; 109–94 | ZAM; 96–77 | MNL; 128–93 | GS; 80–91 | VAL; 89–70 | PAR; 100–51 | PSY ^{(A)} 82–72 | BUL; 85–80* | QC; 74–61 | NEG; 124–77 | ~~BCD~~; ~~97–67~~ | BIÑ ^{(H)} 77–78 | CAL ^{(H)} 76–89 | PSG; 108–86 | MAR; 87–74 | QZN; 80–79 | ILA; 80–52 | MDR; 70–69 | ABR; 74–70 | MYM; 79–80 | ILO; No game |
| General Santos (GS) | BIÑ ^{(A)} 71–67 | MDR; 87–70 | MAR; 81–64 | ~~BCD~~; ~~108–77~~ | ~~ILO~~; ~~120–68~~ | VAL; 83–79 | ILA; 91–83 | NEG; 102–74 | PSY; 98–93 | CEB; 91–80 | ABR; 94–107 | PAR; 126–86 | MNL; 118–71 | BAS; 79–82 | ZAM; 75–70 | PSG; 80–79 | IMS; 124–94 | SJ; 79–81 | RZL ^{(A)} 71–81 | QC; 88–72 | CAL ^{(A)} 85–82 | MYM ^{(A)} 82–88 | QZN ^{(H)} 84–67 | BAN ^{(A)} 96–89 | SAR; 108–89 | BTG ^{(A)} 73–76 | BUL ^{(A)} 102–82 |
| Ilagan Isabela (ILA) | BTG ^{(A)} 68–82 | BAS; 57–56 | IMS; 92–75 | SAR; 104–75 | ZAM; 81–77 | MNL; 99–91 | GS; 83–91 | QC; 83–96 | CAL; 91–100 | QZN; 64–89 | PSG; 100–84 | MDR; 89–79 | BUL; 82–78 | PAR; 104–79 | PSY; 66–75 | ~~BCD~~; ~~107–90~~ | BAN; 80–76 | MAR; 97–85 | BIÑ; 69–90 | NEG; 101–89 | MYM ^{(H)} 80–73 | CEB; 52–80 | RZL; 72–77 | ABR; 67–94 | VAL; 90–98 | SJ; 76–80 | ILO; No game |
| ~~Iloilo~~ (ILO) | ~~BAN~~; ~~82–92~~ | ~~IMS~~; ~~63–71~~ | ~~ZAM~~; ~~74–92~~ | ~~MNL~~; ~~101–96~~ | ~~GS~~; ~~68–120~~ | ~~QC~~; ~~70–102~~ | ~~CAL ^{(A)}~~; ~~49–121~~ | ~~QZN~~; ~~50–87~~ | ~~SJ~~; ~~60–102~~ | ~~PAR~~; ~~81–75~~ | ~~BIÑ~~; ~~64–114~~ | ~~BTG~~; ~~67–102~~ | ~~MAR~~; ~~0–20~~ | ~~NEG~~; ~~0–20~~ | PSG; No game | MDR; No game | RZL; No game | MYM; No game | SAR; No game | ILA; No game | BAS; No game | ABR; No game | BCD; No game | BUL; No game | CEB; No game | PSY; No game | VAL; No game |
| Imus (IMS) | ~~BCD~~; ~~105–111~~ | ~~ILO~~; ~~71–63~~ | ILA; 75–92 | BUL ^{(A)} 86–85 | PSY ^{(A)} 70–109 | CEB; 77–91 | ABR; 75–113 | PSG; 69–82 | BIÑ ^{(A)} 76–131 | MDR; 81–104 | ZAM; 92–102 | PAR; 96–102 | MYM; 75–120 | BAS; 88–98 | MNL; 74–64 | GS; 94–124 | BAN; 50–98 | CAL; 90–122 | VAL; 97–129 | MAR; 110–108 | BTG ^{(A)} 80–88 | SJ; 77–120 | QC; 94–111 | NEG; 84–85 | RZL; 85–102 | QZN; 73–121 | SAR; 89–84 |
| Manila (MNL) | MDR; 93–109 | MYM; 67–82 | ~~BCD~~; ~~73–67~~ | ~~ILO~~; ~~96–101~~ | VAL ^{(H)} 98–108 | ILA; 91–99 | BUL ^{(A)} 78–85 | PSY; 82–126 | CEB; 93–128 | ABR ^{(H)} 77–114 | NEG; 103–109 | GS; 71–118 | PAR; 106–100 | CAL; 91–130 | IMS; 64–74 | BIÑ; 85–129 | QC; 68–122 | RZL; 86–115 | SAR; 92–113 | BAS; 89–102 | BAN; 97–110 | SJ ^{(H)} 75–124 | MAR; 84–108 | PSG; 99–108 | QZN; 65–107 | BTG ^{(H)} 74–126 | ZAM; 0–20 |
| Marikina (MAR) | SAR; 75–66 | ZAM; 68–65 | GS; 64–81 | QC; 79–85 | CAL; 71–84 | ABR; 53–89 | NEG; 96–75 | PAR; 94–69 | BTG ^{(A)} 62–79 | RZL; 74–97 | MYM; 76–92 | BIÑ; 73–103 | ~~ILO~~; ~~20–0~~ | QZN; 67–93 | SJ; 78–106 | VAL; 88–83 | BAS; 93–106 | ~~BCD~~; ~~107–100~~ | ILA; 85–97 | IMS; 108–110 | CEB; 74–87 | MDR; 69–71 | MNL; 108–84 | PSY ^{(A)} 69–87 | PSG; 80–92 | BAN; 78–99 | BUL; 77–84 |
| Meycauayan Marilao (MYM) | ZAM; 94–76 | MNL; 82–67 | QC; 69–78 | CAL ^{(H)} 79–97 | QZN; 75–84 | NEG; 97–73 | RZL; 91–81 | BAN; 75–69 | MAR; 92–76 | SAR; 70–66 | ABR; 75–101 | IMS; 120–75 | BIÑ; 64–70 | VAL; 81–85 | BTG; 61–75 | PSY ^{(A)} 82–77 | SJ; 78–88 | PSG; 105–100 | MDR; 82–84 | PAR; 91–80 | ILA ^{(A)} 73–80 | GS ^{(H)} 88–82 | BUL; 91–80 | CEB; 80–79 | BAS; 76–81 | ILO; No game | BCD; No game |
| Mindoro (MDR) | MNL; 109–93 | GS; 70–87 | QZN; 60–81 | PAR; 119–71 | RZL ^{(A)} 78–84 | BIÑ; 75–100 | BAS; 83–75 | BAN; 83–81 | IMS; 104–81 | BTG; 71–77 | ILA; 79–89 | CAL; 88–91* | VAL ^{(H)} 93–91 | SAR; 110–81 | PSG ^{(A)} 68–69 | ZAM; 83–80 | ABR; 81–97 | MYM; 84–82 | BUL; 97–79 | MAR; 71–69 | CEB; 69–70 | NEG; 120–74 | SJ; 62–74 | QC; 65–61 | PSY; 61–63 | ILO; No game | BCD; No game |
| Negros (NEG) | CAL ^{(A)} 49–77 | BIN; 64–72 | VAL; 67–85 | MYM; 73–97 | MAR; 75–96 | GS; 74–102 | ~~BCD~~; ~~87–99~~ | MNL; 109–103 | ABR; 81–122 | BUL; 70–83 | BTG; 92–119 | ~~ILO~~; ~~20–0~~ | RZL; 78–108 | SAR; 102–108 | CEB; 77–124 | PAR; 94–95 | PSY; 85–118 | BAN ^{(A)} 82–114 | QC; 87–120 | ILA; 89–101 | SJ; 96–120 | PSG; 90–100 | BAS; 86–97 | MDR; 74–120 | IMS; 85–84 | QZN; 70–114 | ZAM; 82–96 |
| Parañaque (PAR) | BUL; 96–102 | PSY ^{(A)} 48–83 | ABR; 81–115 | PSG ^{(A)} 66–76 | RZL; 79–117 | MDR; 71–119 | BTG; 53–91 | MAR; 69–94 | ~~BCD~~; ~~85–86~~ | ~~ILO~~; ~~75–81~~ | VAL; 72–76 | GS; 86–126 | CEB; 51–100 | IMS; 102–96 | MNL; 100–106 | ILA; 79–104 | CAL; 91–127 | QC; 74–106 | SAR; 74–84 | NEG; 95–94 | BAN ^{(A)} 88–139 | ZAM; 76–130 | MYM; 80–91 | BAS; 74–75 | BIÑ; 86–110 | QZN; 66–116 | SJ ^{(H)} 72–145 |
| Pasay (PSY) | SJ; 61–90 | PAR ^{(H)} 83–48 | BAS ^{(H)} 76–82* | BAN ^{(H)} 93–78 | IMS ^{(H)} 109–70 | SAR; 75–58 | ZAM; 81–67 | MNL; 126–82 | GS; 93–98 | QC; 78–76 | CAL ^{(H)} 74–82 | VAL; 85–88 | CEB ^{(H)} 72–82 | ~~BCD~~; ~~100–74~~ | BIÑ ^{(H)} 74–77 | ILA; 75–66 | ABR ^{(H)} 51–68 | MYM ^{(H)} 77–82 | BUL ^{(H)} 89–84 | NEG; 118–85 | BTG ^{(H)} 85–67 | RZL; 61–67 | MAR ^{(H)} 87–69 | QZN ^{(H)} 59–67 | MDR; 63–61 | PSG ^{(H)} 78–69 | ILO; No game |
| Pasig (PSG) | PAR ^{(H)} 76–66 | BTG ^{(A)} 68–98 | BAS; 75–73 | BAN; 97–91* | IMS; 82–69 | SAR; 96–93* | ZAM; 89–91 | ILA; 84–100 | ~~BCD~~; ~~96–84~~ | RZL; 92–65 | SJ; 79–114 | GS; 79–80 | QZN ^{(H)} 55–93 | MDR ^{(H)} 69–68 | VAL; 102–100 | MYM; 100–105 | CEB; 86–108 | ABR; 76–130 | BUL; 105–110* | NEG; 100–90 | MNL; 108–99 | CAL ^{(A)} 87–96 | MAR; 92–80 | BIÑ ^{(A)} 79–121 | QC; 88–89 | PSY ^{(A)} 69–78 | ILO; No game |
| Quezon (QZN) | BIÑ; 66–59 | MDR; 81–60 | MYM; 84–75 | ~~BCD~~; ~~113–61~~ | ~~ILO~~; ~~87–50~~ | VAL; 95–84 | ILA; 89–64 | SAR; 89–59 | MAR; 93–67 | ABR; 77–82 | BTG ^{(H)} 62–65 | PSG ^{(A)} 93–55 | CAL ^{(A)} 72–67 | QC; 93–52 | BAN; 86–73 | BUL ^{(A)} 88–63 | SJ ^{(A)} 78–71 | CEB; 79–80 | PAR; 116–66 | PSY ^{(A)} 67–59 | MNL; 107–65 | GS ^{(A)} 67–84 | NEG; 114–70 | BAS; 97–76 | IMS; 121–73 | ZAM; 86–67 | RZL; 90–74 |
| Quezon City (QC) | CAL ^{(A)} 63–89 | BIÑ; 63–75 | MYM; 78–69 | MAR; 85–79 | ~~BCD~~; ~~93–83~~ | ~~ILO~~; ~~102–70~~ | VAL ^{(H)} 83–90 | ILA; 96–83 | BUL ^{(H)} 92–83 | PSY; 76–78 | SJ; 89–110 | BAS; 83–80 | RZL ^{(A)} 80–90 | BAN; 88–103 | CEB; 61–74 | PAR; 106–74 | QZN; 52–93 | MNL; 122–68 | ZAM; 84–85 | NEG; 120–87 | GS; 72–88 | IMS; 111–94 | ABR; 51–79 | SAR; 107–95 | MDR; 61–65 | BTG; 54–70 | PSG; 89–88 |
| Rizal (RZL) | CEB; 65–81 | CAL ^{(H)} 65–68 | SJ; 94–89* | PAR; 117–79 | MDR ^{(H)} 84–78 | MYM; 81–91 | BAS ^{(H)} 73–76 | MAR; 97–74 | BAN ^{(A)} 100–93 | ~~BCD~~; ~~107–72~~ | PSG; 65–92 | QC ^{(H)} 90–80 | NEG; 108–78 | BUL; 84–70 | ZAM; 91–83 | ABR ^{(A)} 60–89 | MNL; 115–86 | BTG ^{(A)} 66–76 | GS ^{(H)} 81–71 | SAR ^{(H)} 93–65 | PSY; 67–61 | ILA; 77–72 | VAL; 81–71 | BIÑ ^{(H)} 61–65 | IMS; 102–85 | QZN; 74–90 | ILO; No game |
| San Juan (SJ) | PSY; 90–61 | CEB; 81–73 | RZL; 89–94* | ABR ^{(H)} 66–58 | ZAM; 80–73 | ~~BCD~~; ~~128–85~~ | ~~ILO~~; ~~102–60~~ | BAS; 97–79 | QC; 110–89 | CAL ^{(A)} 68–60 | PSG; 114–79 | MAR; 106–78 | BAN; 102–95 | SAR; 110–76 | GS; 81–79 | MYM; 88–78 | VAL; 124–112* | QZN ^{(H)} 71–78 | NEG; 120–96 | MNL ^{(A)} 124–75 | IMS; 120–77 | BIÑ ^{(A)} 64–71 | BTG ^{(A)} 78–71 | MDR; 74–62 | PAR ^{(A)} 145–72 | ILA; 80–76 | BUL; 120–67 |
| Sarangani (SAR) | MAR ^{(A)} 66–75 | ~~BCD~~; ~~96–94~~ | VAL; 72–77 | ILA; 75–104 | BUL; 76–80 | PSY; 58–75 | CEB; 94–109 | ABR; 79–105 | PSG; 93–96* | BIÑ; 84–103 | QZN; 59–89 | MYM ^{(A)} 66–70 | BTG ^{(A)} 64–111 | MDR; 81–110 | NEG; 108–102 | SJ; 76–110 | PAR; 84–74 | ZAM; 77–104 | BAS; 86–93 | MNL; 113–92 | CAL; 83–113 | RZL ^{(A)} 65–93 | BAN; 73–90 | QC; 95–107 | GS; 89–108 | IMS; 84–89 | ILO; No game |
| Valenzuela (VAL) | BAS; 86–99 | BAN ^{(A)} 63–75 | SAR; 77–72 | NEG; 85–67 | MNL ^{(A)} 108–98 | GS; 79–83 | QC ^{(A)} 90–83 | CAL ^{(A)} 58–97 | QZN; 84–95 | PAR; 76–72 | CEB; 70–89 | PSY; 88–85 | ~~BCD~~; ~~92–80~~ | MDR ^{(A)} 91–93 | MYM; 85–81 | MAR; 83–88 | BTG ^{(A)} 83–91 | PSG; 100–102 | IMS; 129–97 | SJ; 112–124* | BIÑ; 74–102 | BUL; 87–82 | ZAM; 73–76 | ABR; 70–106 | RZL; 71–81 | ILA; 98–90 | ILO; No game |
| Zamboanga (ZAM) | MYM; 76–94 | MAR; 65–68 | ~~ILO~~; ~~92–74~~ | ILA; 77–81 | BUL; 73–80 | PSY; 67–81 | CEB; 77–96 | ABR; 60–71 | PSG; 91–89 | BUL; 83–73 | IMS; 102–92 | BIÑ; 53–72 | GS; 70–75 | ~~BCD~~; ~~117–80~~ | BAS; 82–74 | RZL; 83–91 | SAR; 104–77 | MDR; 80–83 | QC; 85–84 | PAR; 130–76 | BTG; 62–72 | VAL; 76–73 | BAN ^{(A)} 94–87 | MNL; 20–0 | NEG; 96–82 | QZN; 67–86 | CAL; 78–82 |

Source: Genius Sports
Legend: Blue = win; Red = loss; Matches with lighter background shading were decided after overtime. (*) Number of asterisks denotes number of overtime periods

Notes

- Any game details are subject to change. The full schedule is revealed over time as the season progresses.
- Games that are played home or away are indicated by the superscript after the opposing team's abbreviation (H for home and A for away). Games with no superscript are neutral-site.
- All Bacolod and Iloilo games were revoked due to the team's disqualification.
- The Caloocan Batang Kankaloo decided to forfeit their game against the Biñan Tatak Gel.
- The Manila Batang Quiapo decided to forfeit their game against the Zamboanga Sikat.

Postponed games

- All games scheduled on August 14, 17, 18, and 20 were postponed due to heavy rains affecting Greater Manila Area and nearby areas.

=== Home-and-away records ===
| Team | Division | Home | | Neutral | | Away | |
| Team | Division | GP | Record | GP | Record | GP | Record |
|---|---|---|---|---|---|---|---|
| Abra Weavers | North | 1 | 1–0 (1.000) | 20 | 19–1 (.950) | 4 | 3–1 (.750) |
| ~~Bacolod Masskara~~ | ~~South~~ | —N/a | | ~~22~~ | ~~3–19 (.136)~~ | —N/a | |
| Basilan Steel | South | —N/a | | 22 | 11–11 (.500) | 4 | 2–2 (.500) |
| Bataan Risers | North | 9 | 5–4 (.556) | 14 | 7–7 (.500) | 2 | 1–1 (.500) |
| Batangas City Athletics | South | 11 | 9–2 (.818) | 11 | 8–3 (.727) | 3 | 2–1 (.667) |
| Biñan Tatak Gel | South | 6 | 4–2 (.667) | 15 | 13–2 (.867) | 4 | 4–0 (1.000) |
| Bulacan Kuyas | North | 5 | 1–4 (.200) | 17 | 5–12 (.294) | 3 | 0–3 (.000) |
| Caloocan Batang Kankaloo | North | 7 | 4–3 (.571) | 13 | 11–2 (.846) | 5 | 5–0 (1.000) |
| Cebu Greats | South | 2 | 0–2 (.000) | 22 | 18–4 (.818) | 1 | 1–0 (1.000) |
| GenSan Warriors | South | 1 | 1–0 (1.000) | 16 | 13–3 (.813) | 7 | 4–3 (.571) |
| Ilagan Isabela Cowboys | North | 1 | 1–0 (1.000) | 23 | 12–11 (.522) | 1 | 0–1 (.000) |
| ~~Iloilo United Royals~~ | ~~South~~ | —N/a | | ~~13~~ | ~~2–11 (.154)~~ | ~~1~~ | ~~0–1 (.000)~~ |
| Imus Bandera | South | —N/a | | 21 | 3–18 (.143) | 4 | 1–3 (.250) |
| Manila Batang Quiapo | North | 4 | 0–4 (.000) | 20 | 1–19 (.050) | 1 | 0–1 (.000) |
| Marikina Shoemasters | North | —N/a | | 25 | 6–19 (.240) | 2 | 0–2 (.000) |
| Meycauayan Marilao Gems | North | 2 | 1–1 (.500) | 20 | 11–9 (.550) | 3 | 1–2 (.333) |
| Mindoro Tamaraws | South | 1 | 1–0 (1.000) | 22 | 12–10 (.545) | 2 | 0–2 (.000) |
| Negros Hacienderos | South | —N/a | | 23 | 2–21 (.087) | 2 | 0–2 (.000) |
| Parañaque Patriots | North | 1 | 0–1 (.000) | 21 | 2–19 (.095) | 3 | 0–3 (.000) |
| Pasay Voyagers | North | 14 | 7–7 (.500) | 11 | 7–4 (.636) | —N/a | |
| Pasig City | North | 3 | 2–1 (.667) | 18 | 9–9 (.500) | 4 | 0–4 (.000) |
| Quezon Huskers | South | 1 | 0–1 (.000) | 17 | 15–2 (.882) | 6 | 5–1 (.833) |
| Quezon City Black Bulls | North | 2 | 1–1 (.500) | 21 | 10–11 (.476) | 2 | 0–2 (.000) |
| Rizal Golden Coolers | South | 7 | 4–3 (.571) | 15 | 11–4 (.733) | 3 | 1–2 (.333) |
| San Juan Knights | North | 2 | 1–1 (.500) | 18 | 17–1 (.944) | 5 | 4–1 (.800) |
| Sarangani Marlins | South | —N/a | | 22 | 3–19 (.136) | 3 | 0–3 (.000) |
| Valenzuela City Darkhorse | North | —N/a | | 19 | 8–11 (.421) | 6 | 2–4 (.333) |
| Zamboanga Sikat | South | —N/a | | 24 | 10–14 (.417) | 1 | 1–0 (1.000) |

== Play-in tournament ==
In each division, the seventh-place team will play against the eighth-place team with the winning team clinching the seventh seed in the playoffs. On the other hand, the ninth-place team will play against the tenth-place team with the losing team being eliminated from playoff contention. The loser of the 7–8 game will then face-off against the winner of the 9–10 game for the eighth seed in the playoffs, with the losing team being eliminated. The first two play-in games in each division are hosted by the seventh-place team in each division, while the final play-in gameday will be hosted by the highest-ranked play-in team remaining.

Teams in bold won the game indicated. Teams in italics have homecourt advantage under the aforementioned rules. The numbers to the left of each team indicate the team's regular season ranking in its division, while the numbers to the right indicate the number of points the team scored in that game.

=== North Division ===
**Play-in games**
7 | **Bataan** | **83**
8 | Pasig City | 75
9 | **Quezon City** | **76**
10 | Valenzuela | 71

**No. 8 seed game**
8 | Pasig City | 81
9 | **Quezon City** | **95**

**Final seeds**
7 | Bataan | No. 7 seed
9 | Quezon City | No. 8 seed

=== South Division ===
**Play-in games**
7 | **Mindoro** | **77**
8 | Basilan | 72
9 | **Zamboanga** | **86**
10 | Imus | 61

**No. 8 seed game**
8 | Basilan | 59
9 | **Zamboanga** | **83**

**Final seeds**
7 | Mindoro | No. 7 seed
9 | Zamboanga | No. 8 seed

== Playoffs ==
The 2026 MPBL playoffs started on October 2, 2026. The first two rounds, the division quarterfinals and semifinals, are best-of-three series, while the division finals are best-of-five series. The national finals will be a best-of-seven series.

=== Bracket ===
Teams in bold advanced to the next round. Teams in italics have homecourt advantage for the series. The numbers to the left of each team indicate the team's seeding in its division, while the numbers to the right indicate the number of games the team won in that round.

Division quarterfinals (best-of-3) | Division semifinals (best-of-3)
N1 | **Abra** | **2**
N8 | Quezon City | 0
N1 | **Abra** | **2**
N5 | Pasay | 0
N4 | Meycauayan Marilao | 1
N5 | **Pasay** | **2**
**North Division**
N2 | **San Juan** | **2**
N7 | Bataan | 0
N2 | **San Juan** | **2**
N3 | Caloocan | 0
N3 | **Caloocan** | **2**
N6 | Ilagan Isabela | 0
S1 | **Quezon** | **2**
S8 | Zamboanga | 1
S1 | **Quezon** | **2**
S5 | Cebu | 0
S4 | Batangas City | 0
S5 | **Cebu** | **2**
**South Division**
S2 | **Biñan** | **2**
S7 | Mindoro | 0
S2 | **Biñan** | **2**
S6 | Rizal | 0
S3 | General Santos | 0
S6 | **Rizal** | **2**

Division finals (best-of-5)
N1 | **Abra** | **3**
N2 | San Juan | 0
S1 | **Quezon** | **3**
S2 | Biñan | 1

National finals (best-of-7)
N1 | Abra
S1 | Quezon

=== Division quarterfinals ===
==== North Division ====
| Team 1 | Series | Team 2 | Game 1 | Game 2 | Game 3 |
|---|---|---|---|---|---|
| **(1) Abra Weavers** | **2**–0 | (8) Quezon City Black Bulls | **106**–54 | **84**–70 | — |
| **(2) San Juan Knights** | **2**–0 | (7) Bataan Risers | **94**–84 | **82**–77 | — |
| **(3) Caloocan Batang Kankaloo** | **2**–0 | (6) Ilagan Isabela Cowboys | **81**–76 | **83**–72 | — |
| (4) Meycauayan Marilao Gems | 1–**2** | **(5) Pasay Voyagers** | 64–**66** (OT) | **57**–53 | 59–**61** |

==== South Division ====
| Team 1 | Series | Team 2 | Game 1 | Game 2 | Game 3 |
|---|---|---|---|---|---|
| **(1) Quezon Huskers** | **2**–1 | (8) Zamboanga Sikat | **88**–55 | 64–**67** | **99**–85 |
| **(2) Biñan Tatak Gel** | **2**–0 | (7) Mindoro Tamaraws | **78**–70 | **91**–77 | — |
| (3) GenSan Warriors | 0–**2** | **(6) Rizal Golden Coolers** | 73–**78** | 74–**96** | — |
| (4) Batangas City Athletics | 0–**2** | **(5) Cebu Greats** | 77–**78** | 67–**70** | — |

=== Division semifinals ===
==== North Division ====
| Team 1 | Series | Team 2 | Game 1 | Game 2 | Game 3 |
|---|---|---|---|---|---|
| **(1) Abra Weavers** | **2**–0 | (5) Pasay Voyagers | **81**–71 | **77**–69 | — |
| **(2) San Juan Knights** | **2**–0 | (3) Caloocan Batang Kankaloo | **73**–71 (OT) | **82**–78 (OT) | — |

==== South Division ====
| Team 1 | Series | Team 2 | Game 1 | Game 2 | Game 3 |
|---|---|---|---|---|---|
| **(1) Quezon Huskers** | **2**–0 | (5) Cebu Greats | **77**–67 | **83**–55 | — |
| **(2) Biñan Tatak Gel** | **2**–0 | (6) Rizal Golden Coolers | **72**–70 | **82**–67 | — |

=== Division finals ===
==== North Division ====
| Team 1 | Series | Team 2 | Game 1 | Game 2 | Game 3 | Game 4 | Game 5 |
|---|---|---|---|---|---|---|---|
| **(1) Abra Weavers** | **3**–0 | (2) San Juan Knights | **59**–58 | **76**–65 | **76**–68 | — | — |

==== South Division ====
| Team 1 | Series | Team 2 | Game 1 | Game 2 | Game 3 | Game 4 | Game 5 |
|---|---|---|---|---|---|---|---|
| **(1) Quezon Huskers** | **3**–1 | (2) Biñan Tatak Gel | 74–**83** | **74**–54 | **81**–67 | **69**–68 | — |

=== National finals ===
| Team 1 | Series | Team 2 | Game 1 | Game 2 | Game 3 | Game 4 | Game 5 | Game 6 | Game 7 |
|---|---|---|---|---|---|---|---|---|---|
| (N1) Abra Weavers | – | (S1) Quezon Huskers | Nov. 24 | Nov. 27 | Nov. 30 | Dec. 2 | Dec. 5* | Dec. 14* | Dec. 16* |

== All-Star Game ==
2026 MPBL All-Star Game
| North All-Stars | South All-Stars |
|---|---|
| 89 | 89 |
| Head coach: Yong Garcia (Abra Solid North Weavers) | Head coach: Pocholo Villanueva (Batangas City Athletics) |
| | 1 | 2 | 3 | 4 | Total |
|---|---|---|---|---|---|
| North All-Stars | 17 | 24 | 28 | 20 | 89 |
| South All-Stars | 20 | 22 | 16 | 31 | 89 |
- Date: September 19, 2026
- Venue: Ynares Center Montalban, Rodriguez, Rizal
- MVP: Dave Ildefonso and Judel Fuentes
- Network: Solar Sports

The 2026 MPBL All-Star Game, the league's seventh overall, was supposed to take place on August 29 at the Ynares Center Montalban in Rodriguez, Rizal, the home arena of the Rizal Golden Coolers. Due to inclement weather affecting Greater Manila Area, the annual All-Star weekend was postponed and moved to September 19.

=== Coaches ===
A head coach from each division, usually from a higher-ranked team, is selected to represent their respective divisions. On August 8, 2026, Yong Garcia of the Abra Solid North Weavers and Pocholo Villanueva of the Batangas City Athletics were announced as this season's all-star coaches.

Garcia will be coaching the North All-Stars for the second straight season, while Villanueva will lead the South All-Stars for the second time, having coached in 2022.

=== Lineups ===
The starters were announced on July 30, 2026. In the North Division, Orlan Wamar Jr. of the San Juan Knights was selected as an all-star starter for the fourth consecutive season. Abra's Dave Ildefonso was selected as an all-star starter for the second consecutive season. Raven Gonzales of Abra and Warlo Batac of Pasig City will make their second all-star appearance and their first as an all-star starter. Kymani Ladi of the Caloocan Batang Kankaloo will make his all-star debut.

In the South Division, Hesed Gabo of the GenSan Warriors and Jhan Nermal of the Batangas City Athletics will make their second all-star appearance. Biñan's Nic Cabañero, Quezon's Cedrick Manzano, and Cebu's Mark Meneses will make their all-star debuts.

The reserves were announced a week later on August 6. In the North Division, Christian Fajarito of the Pasay Voyagers and Arth Dela Cruz of the Ilagan Isabela Cowboys will make their third straight all-star appearance, and the second in their respective teams. Caloocan's Kean Baclaan, San Juan's Harold Alarcon, Meycauayan's Agem Miranda, Quezon City's MJ Joson, and Valenzuela's Jay Collado will make their all-star debuts.

In the South Division, John Wilson of the Basilan Steel and Judel Fuentes of the Quezon Huskers will make their third all-star appearance. Batangas City's Ino Comboy was selected as an all-star reserve for the second consecutive season. Gensan's Anton Eusebio, Cebu's Simon Camacho, Rizal's Billy Robles, and Mindoro's Bambam Gamalinda will make their all-star debuts.

The coach's picks were announced on August 13. In the North Division, Michael Calisaan of the San Juan Knights will make his second all-star appearance. Abra's DJ Fenner and Caloocan's Dominic Escobar will make their all-star debuts.

In the South Division, Cedric Ablaza of Batangas City will make his fifth all-star appearance, the most of any player in MPBL All-Star history. Zamboanga's Brandon Wilson and Mindoro's JC Recto will make their all-star debuts.

The replacement for the South Division were announced on September 15. Marc Pingris of the Biñan Tatak Gel replaced Manzano, who opted out of the event due to injury that he sustained in their game against the GenSan Warriors last September 5. Pingris will make his third straight all-star appearance and his second as an all-star starter.

North All-Stars
| Pos. | Player | Team | No. of selections |
Starters
| | Dave Ildefonso | Abra Weavers | 2 |
| | Raven Gonzales | Abra Weavers | 2 |
| | Orlan Wamar Jr. | San Juan Knights | 4 |
| | Kymani Ladi | Caloocan Batang Kankaloo | 1 |
| | Warlo Batac | Pasig City | 2 |
Reserves
| | Christian Fajarito | Pasay Voyagers | 3 |
| | Arth Dela Cruz | Ilagan Isabela Cowboys | 3 |
| | Michael Calisaan | San Juan Knights | 2 |
| | DJ Fenner | Abra Weavers | 1 |
| | Harold Alarcon | San Juan Knights | 1 |
| | Kean Baclaan | Caloocan Batang Kankaloo | 1 |
| | Dominic Escobar | Caloocan Batang Kankaloo | 1 |
| | Agem Miranda | Meycauayan Marilao Gems | 1 |
| | Jay Collado | Valenzuela City Darkhorse | 1 |
| | MJ Joson | Quezon City Black Bulls | 1 |
Head coach: Yong Garcia (Abra Solid North Weavers)

South All-Stars
| Pos. | Player | Team | No. of selections |
Starters
| | Hesed Gabo | GenSan Warriors | 2 |
| | Jhan Nermal | Batangas City Athletics | 2 |
| | Marc Pingris (Note: Cedrick Manzano was initially announced as a starter but was replaced by Marc Pingris due to injury.) | Biñan Tatak Gel | 3 |
| | Nic Cabañero | Biñan Tatak Gel | 1 |
| | Mark Meneses | Cebu Greats | 1 |
Reserves
| | Cedric Ablaza | Batangas City Athletics | 5 |
| | Judel Fuentes | Quezon Huskers | 3 |
| | John Wilson | Basilan Steel | 3 |
| | Wendelino Comboy | Mindoro Tamaraws | 2 |
| | Anton Eusebio | GenSan Warriors | 1 |
| | Simon Camacho | Cebu Greats | 1 |
| | Billy Robles | Rizal Golden Coolers | 1 |
| | JC Recto | Mindoro Tamaraws | 1 |
| | Brandon Wilson | Zamboanga Sikat | 1 |
Head coach: Pocholo Villanueva (Batangas City Athletics)

=== Game ===
Solar Sports

September 19, 2026
8:30 p.m.

Boxscore

| North All-Stars | 89–89 | South All-Stars |
Scoring by quarter: 17–20, 24–22, 28–16, 20–31
| Pts: Dave Ildefonso 15; Rebs: Raven Gonzales 7 Asts: Orlan Wamar Jr. 7 | | Pts: Judel Fuentes 14; Rebs: Bambam Gamalinda 8 Asts: Hesed Gabo 8 |

Ynares Center Montalban, Rodriguez, Rizal
Referees: Allan Manzano, Bennette Francisco Jr., Hallyric Damicog

== Statistics ==
=== Individual leaders ===
As of August 28, 2026

| Category | Player | Team | Statistic |
|---|---|---|---|
| Points per game | John Wilson | Basilan Steel | 18.7 |
| Rebounds per game | Arth Dela Cruz | Ilagan Isabela Cowboys | 10.1 |
| Assists per game | Ian Melencio | Valenzuela City Darkhorse | 7.2 |
| Steals per game | MJ Joson | Quezon City Black Bulls | 2.9 |
| Blocks per game | King Destacamento | Valenzuela City Darkhorse | 2.2 |

=== Team leaders ===
As of September 12, 2026

| Category | Team | Statistic |
|---|---|---|
| Points per game | San Juan Knights | 96.6 |
| Rebounds per game | Cebu Greats | 50.9 |
| Assists per game | San Juan Knights | 28.9 |
| Steals per game | Caloocan Batang Kankaloo | 9.7 |
| Blocks per game | Abra Weavers | 4.7 |
| Turnovers per game | Marikina Shoemasters | 15.1 |

== Awards ==
=== Player of the Week ===
| Week | Player | Ref. |
|---|---|---|
| April 10–18, 2026 | Louie Vigil (Marikina Shoemasters) | |
| April 20–25, 2026 | Paul Desiderio (Cebu Greats) | |
| April 7 – May 2, 2026 | Mark Meneses (Cebu Greats) (1/2) | |
| May 4–9, 2026 | Mike Phillips (San Juan Knights) | |
| May 11–16, 2026 | Nic Cabañero (Biñan Tatak Gel) (1/2) | |
| May 18–23, 2026 | Jeff Manday (Caloocan Batang Kankaloo) | |
| May 25–30, 2026 | Hesed Gabo (GenSan Warriors) | |
| June 1–6, 2026 | Jake Figueroa (Abra Weavers) | |
| June 8–13, 2026 | Jay Collado (Valenzuela City Darkhorse) | |
| June 15–20, 2026 | Dom Escobar (Caloocan Batang Kankaloo) | |
| June 22–27, 2026 | DJ Fenner (Abra Weavers) | |
| June 29 – July 4, 2026 | Cedrick Manzano (Quezon Huskers) | |
| July 6–11, 2026 | Shawn Argente (Meycauayan Marilao Gems) | |
| July 13–18, 2026 | Warlo Batac (Pasig City) | |
| July 20–25, 2026 | Ino Comboy (Batangas City Athletics) | |
| July 27 – August 1, 2026 | Dave Ildefonso (Abra Weavers) | |
| August 3–8, 2026 | Al Francis Tamsi (Cebu Greats) | |
| August 10–15, 2026 | Joshua Fontanilla (GenSan Warriors) | |
| August 17–22, 2026 | Not awarded | |
| August 24–29, 2026 | Kymani Ladi (Caloocan Batang Kankaloo) | |
| August 31 – September 5, 2026 | Mark Meneses (Cebu Greats) (2/2) | |
| September 7–12, 2026 | Nic Cabañero (Biñan Tatak Gel) (2/2) | |
| September 14–19, 2026 | Gab Cometa (Basilan Steel) | |

== Notable events ==
- On May 14, 2026, the league held its first games at the Novadeci Convention Center in Quezon City. It was also the sixth home venue used by the Quezon City Black Bulls.
- On May 15, 2026, the league held its first games at the Victory Coliseum in San Rafael, Bulacan. It was also the fourth home venue used by the Bulacan Kuyas.
- On June 23, 2026, the league revoked Iloilo United Royals' franchise following the abandonment of its obligations and participation in the league. It also issued a permanent ban on the officers involved.
- On July 18, 2026, the league held its first games at the Cebu Coliseum in Cebu City. It was also the second home venue used by the Cebu Greats.
- On July 30, 2026, the league suspended Bacolod Masskara's franchise for the rest of the season following allegations of game manipulation during a July 28 game against the Bulacan Kuyas. It also issued a permanent ban on Bacolod Masskara players and coaches involved in the incident.

== Records and milestones ==
=== Records ===
- July 20, 2026 - The Abra Solid North Weavers set the record for the largest margin of victory with 84 points, surpassing the previous record made by the San Juan Knights with 82 points in 2022.
- September 10, 2026 - Nic Cabañero of the Biñan Tatak Gel set the record for the most points scored in a game with 53 points, surpassing the previous record made by Jeff Viernes of 50 points in 2023.

=== Milestones ===
- April 20, 2026 - JP Sarao became the 62nd player to reach 1,000 MPBL career points.
- May 2, 2026 - Rodel Vagyan became the 63rd player to reach 1,000 MPBL career points.
- May 5, 2026 - Shaq Alanes became the 64th player to reach 1,000 MPBL career points.
- May 26, 2026 - Alwin Alday became the third player to reach 2,000 MPBL career points.
- July 15, 2026 - Marlon Monte became the 65th player to reach 1,000 MPBL career points.
- July 21, 2026 - Joel Lee Yu became the 66th player to reach 1,000 MPBL career points.
- July 23, 2026 - Dexter Maiquez became the 67th player to reach 1,000 MPBL career points.
- July 25, 2026 - Jacob Galicia became the 68th player to reach 1,000 MPBL career points.
- July 29, 2026 - Hesed Gabo became the first player to reach 1,000 MPBL career assists.
- July 30, 2026 - Michael Calisaan became the 70th player to reach 1,000 MPBL career points.
- August 3, 2026 - Hesed Gabo became the 71st player to reach 1,000 MPBL career points.
  - Hesed Gabo also became the first player to reach 1,000 MPBL career points and assists.
- August 4, 2026 - Nikko Panganiban became the 72nd player to reach 1,000 MPBL career points.
- August 11, 2026 - Adi Santos became the 73rd player to reach 1,000 MPBL career points.
- August 25, 2026 - Jerome Garcia became the 74th player to reach 1,000 MPBL career points.
- September 11, 2026 - Cedric Ablaza became the fourth player to reach 2,000 MPBL career points.
- October 15, 2026 - Dave Ildefonso became the 75th player to reach 1,000 MPBL career points.

== Media coverage ==
This will be the second consecutive season of Solar Sports' broadcast partnership with the league. The network signed a renewed agreement ahead of the regular season. As part of the new agreement, Solar Sports will air twelve games per week across four gamedays, doubled from six in the 2025 agreement. This also allows the network to air all games of the 2026 MPBL playoffs instead of being limited to a selection.

TAP Sports' broadcast has returned as well Blast TV to allows shared Solar Sports under sub-licensing.
