= Ilagan Isabela Cowboys =

Basketball team in Ilagan City, Isabela, Philippines

- 2026 Ilagan Isabela Cowboys season
- Division: North
- League: The Asian Tournament; Maharlika Pilipinas Basketball League
- Founded: February 1, 2025; 20 months ago
- History: Ilagan Isabela Cowboys; 2025–present
- Arena: The Capital Arena
- Location: Ilagan City, Isabela
- Team colors
- Main sponsor: Five Star Chicken
- Head coach: Alex Cabagnot
- Championships: 0
- Division titles: 0

The Ilagan Isabela Cowboys (also known as Ilagan Isabela-Five Star Cowboys for sponsorship reasons) is a Filipino professional basketball team based in Ilagan, Isabela. The team competes in The Asian Tournament (TAT) and mainly in the Maharlika Pilipinas Basketball League (MPBL) as a member of the league's North Division. The team plays its home games at the Capital Arena.

The Ilagan-based franchise began play in the 2025 season as the league's newest expansion team to date. The Cowboys are the lone team based in the Cagayan Valley region and one of two teams based in Northern Luzon, alongside the Abra Weavers.

== History ==
=== Basketball in Cagayan Valley ===
The Cagayan Valley was first represented by the Cagayan Rising Suns of the PBA D-League and Pilipinas Commercial Basketball League (PCBL), playing from 2012 to 2015. In 2022, the Cagayan Valley Golden Eagles represented the region during the inaugural season of the Pilipinas Super League (PSL).

=== Establishment ===
In 2024, the MPBL began expanding into the northern regions of Luzon for its sixth season of play. It added two expansion teams: the Pangasinan Heatwaves from the Ilocos Region and the Abra Weavers from Cordillera, leaving Cagayan Valley behind. On January 16, 2025, league commissioner Kenneth Duremdes announced that the city of Ilagan will acquire an expansion team for the 2025 season. The expansion team was formally established on February 1 in Parañaque, with the league also announcing the name of the team as the Ilagan Isabela Cowboys. Former JRU Heavy Bombers head coach Louie Gonzalez was appointed as head coach of the Ilagan-based team after parting ways with JRU a month prior.

The team played its first-ever game at home at the Capital Arena as part of opening day, where they defeated the Sarangani Gripper Motorcycle Tire, 74–54.

== Home venues ==
The team uses the Capital Arena as its primary home venue, which opened in November 2024 and has capacity of 10,000.

Venue	Location	Capacity	2025
Capital Arena	Ilagan, Isabela	10,000	✓

== Personnel ==
=== Current roster ===
Ilagan Isabela Cowboys roster
Players

Pos.	No.	Name	Height	Weight	DOB	From
G	0	Roed Aggarao (HG)	5 ft 11 in (1.80 m)
G	1	Kyle Brandon Paranada	5 ft 9 in (1.75 m)			UST
G	2	Donald Gumaru (HG)	5 ft 11 in (1.80 m)	160 lb (73 kg)	1992–09–20	Arellano
G	3	TJ Felebrico (HG)	6 ft 2 in (1.88 m)			San Sebastian
G	5	Alex Cabagnot	6 ft 0 in (1.83 m)	185 lb (84 kg)	1982–12–08	Hawaiʻi–Hilo
F	7	John Paul Cauilan (HG)	6 ft 4 in (1.93 m)			National-U
G/F	8	Robby Celiz	6 ft 3 in (1.91 m)	217 lb (98 kg)	1988–09–07	National-U
F	9	Prince Rivero (HG)	6 ft 3 in (1.91 m)		1995–02–19	De La Salle
G	10	Shan Bautista (HG)	5 ft 9 in (1.75 m)
F	11	Miguel Ona	6 ft 5 in (1.96 m)			Far Eastern
F	12	Gabriel Martin Capacio	6 ft 2 in (1.88 m)			De La Salle
G	13	Guilmer Dela Torre (HG)	5 ft 10 in (1.78 m)		1997-11-25	Arellano
C	15	Allan Santos	6 ft 4 in (1.93 m)			Lyceum
F	17	Victor Buraga (HG)	6 ft 3 in (1.91 m)			St. Jude
F	18	Arthur dela Cruz	6 ft 4 in (1.93 m)	210 lb (95 kg)	1992–01–09	San Beda
G	22	Chino Mosqueda	6 ft 0 in (1.83 m)		1996–05–13	National-U
G	24	Aldrin Adorio (HG)	6 ft 0 in (1.83 m)
G/F	25	Jesper Ayaay	6 ft 3 in (1.91 m)			Lyceum
G	29	Allen Mina (HG)	6 ft 3 in (1.91 m)	185 lb (84 kg)	1996–09–22	Letran
F	30	Efrain Boado (HG)	6 ft 3 in (1.91 m)
C	41	Jayboy Solis	6 ft 5 in (1.96 m)			Olivarez
F/C	88	Barkley Eboña	6 ft 6 in (1.98 m)	194 lb (88 kg)	1996–11–29	Far Eastern

Coaches

Head coach

- Louie Gonzalez

Assistant coach(es)

- Glenn Capacio
- Alex Callueng
- Eric Dela Cuesta
- Mixson Ramos
- Ethel Tacorda

Team manager

- Joji Fournier

Legend

- (HG) Homegrown
- (FF) Filipino-foreigner
- (EA) EASL player
- (RS) Reserve player
- (S) Suspended
- Injured

- Roster – via Genius Sports
Updated as of: June 21, 2026

=== Head coaches ===
Ilagan Isabela Cowboys head coaches
#	Name	Start	End	Achievements	Ref.
1	Louie Gonzalez	2025	2026	—	
2	Alex Cabagnot	2026	current	-	

== Season-by-season records ==
=== Maharlika Pilipinas Basketball League ===
Season	Regular season							Playoffs	
Season	Division	Finish	GP	W	L	PCT	GB	Stage	Results
Ilagan Isabela Cowboys
2025	North	8th	29	15	14	.517	13	Division quarterfinals	lost vs. Abra, 0–2
2026	North	6th	25	13	12	.517	10	Division quarterfinals	lost vs. Caloocan, 0–2
All-time regular season record			54	28	26	.519		2 playoff appearances	
All-time playoff record			4	0	4	.000		0 finals appearance	
All-time overall record			58	28	30	.483		0 championships	

== Notable players ==
=== PBA players ===
Ex-PBA players

- Alex Cabagnot
- Arthur dela Cruz
- Barkley Eboña

Drafted to PBA

- Dave Ando – 14th overall, season 50
