= Lagangilang =

Municipality in Abra, Philippines

- Municipality
- Municipality of Lagangilang
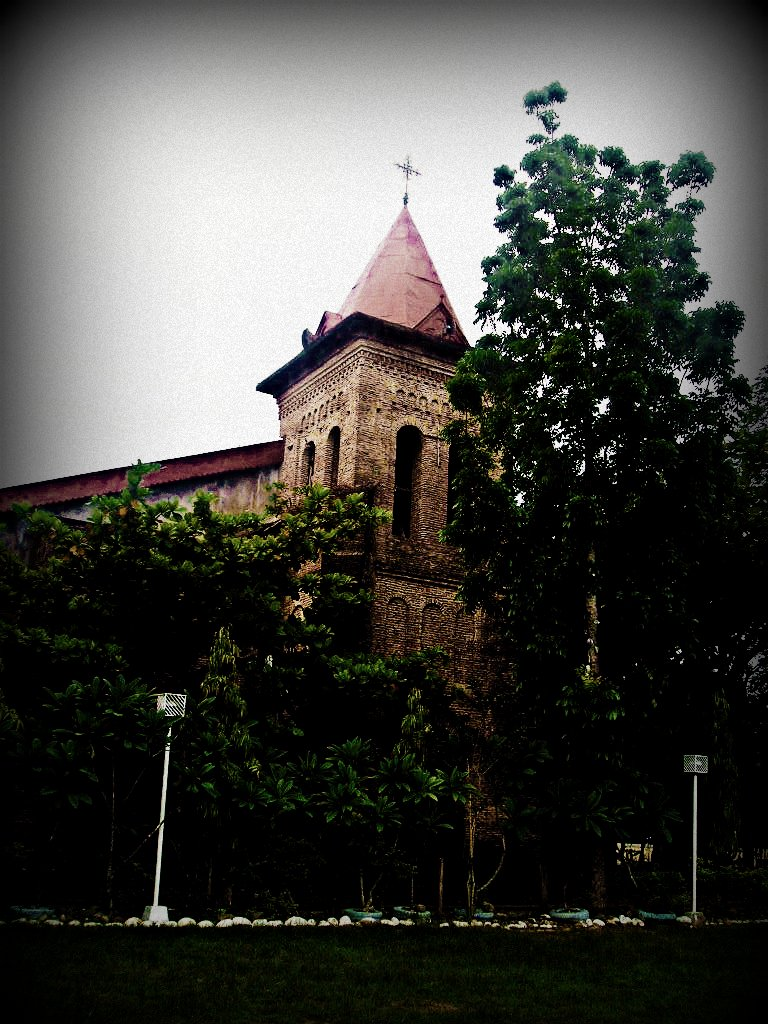
- Holy Cross Parish Church of Lagangilang

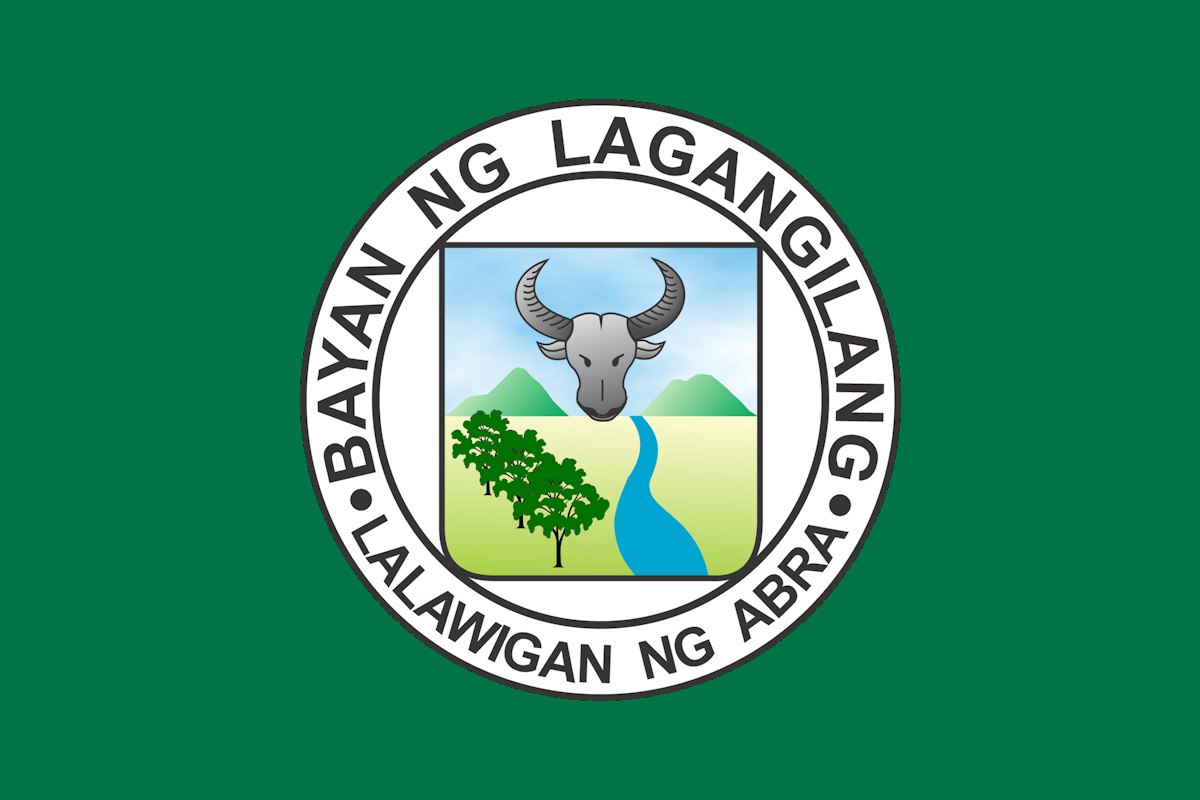
- Flag Seal

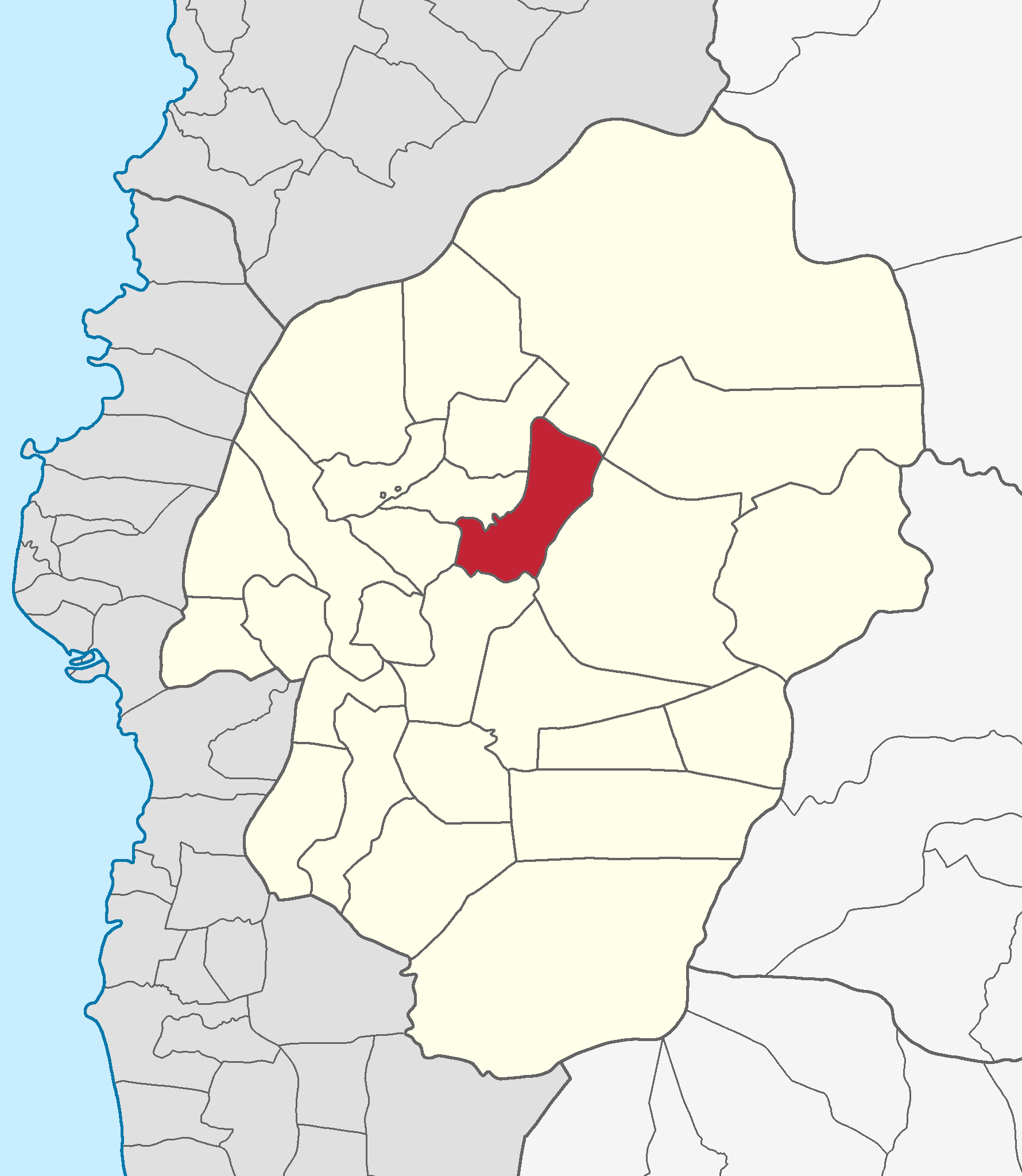
- Map of Abra with Lagangilang highlighted
- Interactive map of Lagangilang
- Location within the Philippines
- Coordinates: 17°37′N 120°44′E
- Country: Philippines
- Region: Cordillera Administrative Region
- Province: Abra
- District: Lone district
- Barangays: 17 (see Barangays)

Government
  - Type: Sangguniang Bayan
  - Mayor: Rovelyn E. Villamor
  - Vice Mayor: Roderick T. Atmosfera
  - Representative: Joseph Santo Niño B. Bernos
  - Municipal Council: Members: Rodney D. Omli; Charles A. Claustro; Romeo A. Atmosfera; Maryzoul B. Alvis; Tito B. Tuzon; Joseph T. Flores; Reynante P. Alvarade; Edna B. Caliboso
  - Electorate: 11,101 voters (2025)

Area
  - Total: 101.44 km^{2} (39.17 sq mi)
- Elevation: 111 m (364 ft)
- Highest elevation: 343 m (1,125 ft)
- Lowest elevation: 49 m (161 ft)

Population (2024 census)
  - Total: 14,577
  - Density: 143.70/km^{2} (372.18/sq mi)
  - Households: 3,415

Economy
  - Income class: 3rd municipal income class
  - Poverty incidence: 11.88% (2023)
  - Revenue: ₱ 163.4 million (2022)
  - Assets: ₱ 302.5 million (2022)
  - Expenditure: ₱ 162.9 million (2022)
  - Liabilities: ₱ 71.27 million (2022)

Service provider
  - Electricity: Abra Electric Cooperative (ABRECO)
- Time zone: UTC+8 (PST)
- ZIP code: 2802
- PSGC: 1400110000
- IDD : area code: +63 (0)74
- Native languages: Itneg, Ilocano, Filipino

Lagangilang, officially the Municipality of Lagangilang (Ilocano: Ili ti Lagangilang; Filipino: Bayan ng Lagangilang), is a municipality in the province of Abra, Philippines. According to the 2024 census, it has a population of 14,577 people.

== Geography ==
According to the Philippine Statistics Authority, the municipality has a land area of 101.44 square kilometres (39.17 sq mi) constituting 2.44% of the 4,165.25-square-kilometre- (1,608.21 sq mi) total area of Abra. Lagangilang is located at 17°37′N 120°44′E.

Lagangilang is situated 17.90 kilometres (11.12 mi) from the provincial capital Bangued, and 423.75 kilometres (263.31 mi) from the country's capital city of Manila.

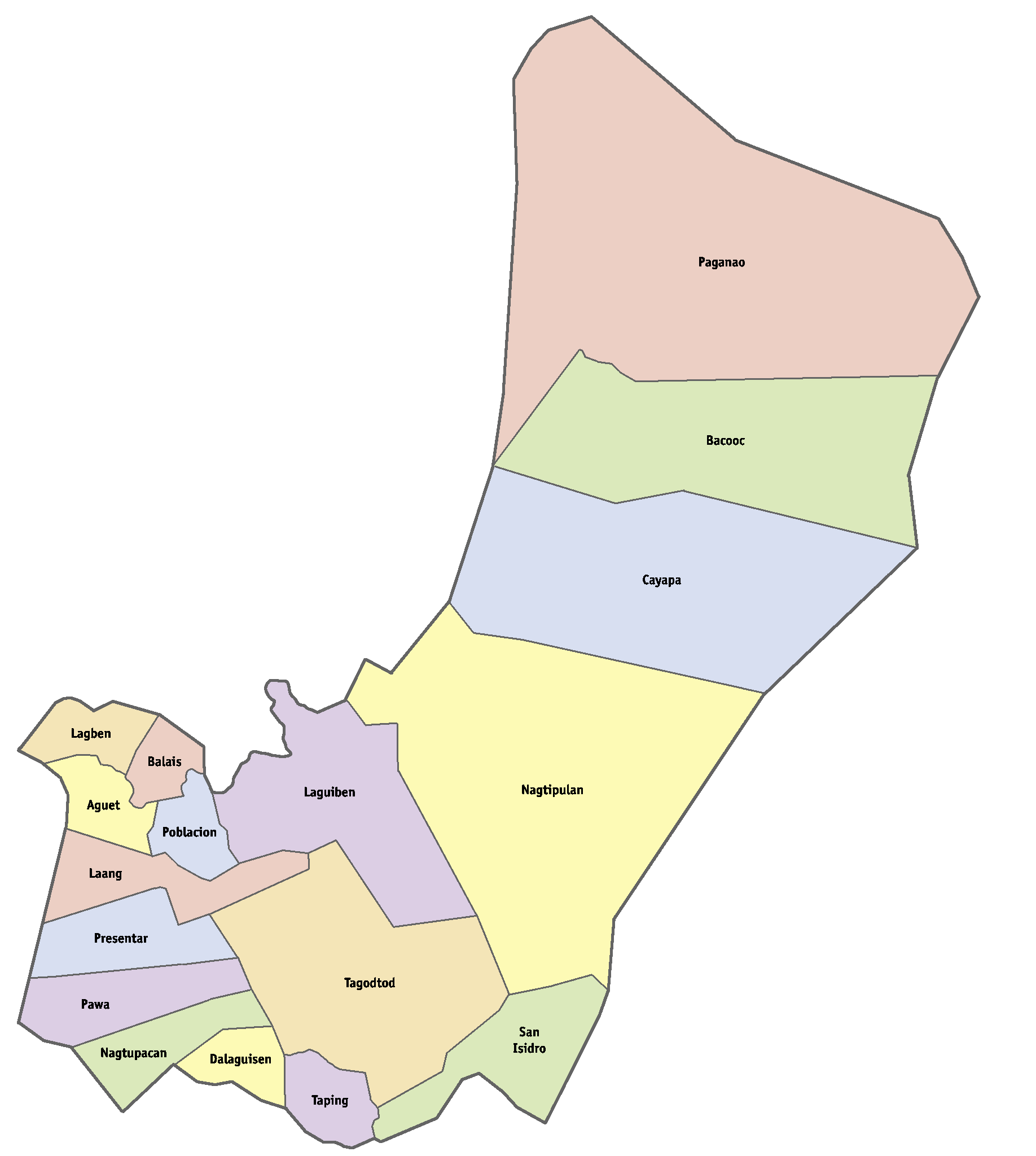
Political map of Lagangilang

=== Barangays ===
Lagangilang is politically subdivided into 17 barangays. Each barangay consists of puroks and some have sitios.

PSGC	Barangay	Population			±% p.a.	
		2024		2010		
140110001	Aguet	1.7%	246	288	▾	−1.09%
140110002	Bacooc	3.0%	440	379	▴	1.04%
140110003	Balais	3.2%	460	533	▾	−1.02%
140110004	Cayapa	6.1%	896	992	▾	−0.70%
140110005	Dalaguisen	5.7%	829	840	▾	−0.09%
140110006	Laang	4.5%	652	797	▾	−1.38%
140110007	Lagben	2.6%	377	397	▾	−0.36%
140110008	Laguiben	8.2%	1,191	944	▴	1.62%
140110009	Nagtipulan	10.2%	1,488	1,209	▴	1.45%
140110010	Nagtupacan	8.1%	1,184	1,059	▴	0.78%
140110011	Paganao	2.4%	343	342	▴	0.02%
140110012	Pawa	2.7%	396	360	▴	0.66%
140110013	Poblacion	9.4%	1,369	1,473	▾	−0.51%
140110014	Presentar	5.8%	842	725	▴	1.04%
140110015	San Isidro	11.4%	1,668	1,415	▴	1.15%
140110016	Tagodtod	14.2%	2,074	1,617	▴	1.74%
140110017	Taping	3.1%	459	454	▴	0.08%
	Total		14,577	13,824	▴	0.37%

=== Climate ===
Climate data for Lagangilang, Abra
Month	Jan	Feb	Mar	Apr	May	Jun	Jul	Aug	Sep	Oct	Nov	Dec	Year
Mean daily maximum °C (°F)	27 (81)	28 (82)	30 (86)	32 (90)	31 (88)	31 (88)	30 (86)	30 (86)	30 (86)	29 (84)	29 (84)	27 (81)	30 (85)
Mean daily minimum °C (°F)	19 (66)	20 (68)	21 (70)	23 (73)	24 (75)	25 (77)	24 (75)	25 (77)	24 (75)	22 (72)	22 (72)	20 (68)	22 (72)
Average precipitation mm (inches)	24 (0.9)	26 (1.0)	25 (1.0)	43 (1.7)	159 (6.3)	180 (7.1)	204 (8.0)	207 (8.1)	183 (7.2)	185 (7.3)	91 (3.6)	67 (2.6)	1,394 (54.8)
Average rainy days	8.2	8.7	10.1	13.7	22.3	24.3	25.3	23.5	22.2	16.4	14.1	12.7	201.5
Source: Meteoblue

== Demographics ==
Population census of Lagangilang
Year	Pop.	±% p.a.
1918	4,851	—
1939	5,135	+0.27%
1948	5,450	+0.66%
1960	6,762	+1.81%
1970	8,905	+2.79%
1975	8,532	−0.85%
1980	9,466	+2.10%
1990	11,248	+1.74%
1995	12,023	+1.26%
2000	12,073	+0.09%
2007	13,490	+1.54%
2010	13,824	+0.89%
2015	14,255	+0.59%
2020	14,914	+0.96%
2024	14,577	−0.55%
Source: Philippine Statistics Authority

In the 2024 census, Lagangilang had a population of 14,577 people. The population density was 140 inhabitants per square kilometre (360/sq mi).

== Economy ==
Poverty incidence of Lagangilang (%)

Source: Philippine Statistics Authority

The municipality is known for agriculture, farming, livestock, and food security. In the agricultural aspect, Lagangilang focuses on rice, corn, and root vegetables. Lagangilang built a multiplier farm project hosted at the University of Abra.

== Government ==
=== Local government ===
Lagangilang, belonging to the lone congressional district of the province of Abra, is governed by a mayor designated as its local chief executive and by a municipal council as its legislative body in accordance with the Local Government Code. The mayor, vice mayor, and the councilors are elected directly by the people through an election which is being held every three years.

=== Elected officials ===
Members of the Municipal Council (2025–2028)
Position	Name
Congressman	Joseph Santo Niño B. Bernos
Mayor	Rovelyn E. Villamor
Vice-Mayor	Roderick T. Atmosfera
Councilors	Rodney D. Omli
Councilors	Maryzoul B. Alvis
Councilors	Charles A. Claustro
Councilors	Romeo A. Atmosfera
Councilors	Edna B. Caliboso
Councilors	Tito B. Tuzon
Councilors	Reynante P. Alvarade
Councilors	Mauro R. Bringas

== Education ==
The Lagangilang Schools District Office governs all educational institutions within the municipality. It oversees the management and operations of all private and public, from primary to secondary schools.

=== Primary and elementary schools ===
- Bacooc Elementary School
- Bright Kid Guided Development School
- Caridad Azares Elementary School
- Cayapa Elementary School
- Dalaguisen Elementary School
- Gaddani Elementary School
- Lagangilang Central School
- Lagben Primary School
- Metodio Elementary School
- Nagtipulan Elementary School
- Paganao Elementary School
- Presentar Elementary School
- Tagodtod Elementary School
- Villa San Isidro Elementary School
- Willy Castillo Primary School
- Taping Primary School

=== Secondary schools ===
- Cayapa National High School
- Tagodtod National High School

=== Higher educational institution ===
- University of Abra (formerly Abra State Institute of Sciences and Technology)-Main Campus
