= Nic Cabañero =

Filipino basketball player (born 2003)

Personal information
- Born: October 3, 2003 (age 23)
- Listed height: 6 ft 3 in (191 cm)

Career information
- High school: Ateneo de Cebu (Mandaue); San Beda (Taytay, Rizal)
- College: UST
- Playing career: 2026–present

Career history
- 2026: Biñan Tatak Gel

Career highlights
- MPBL All-Star (2026); UAAP 3x3 champion (2021); UAAP Mythical Team (2024, 2025)

Nicael Dominie Cabañero is a Filipino professional basketball player who last played for the Biñan Tatak Gel of the Maharlika Pilipinas Basketball League.

== Early life and education ==
Nic Cabañero was born on October 3, 2003, to Dominic and Annalene Cabañero. His father, Dominic is a basketball coach. While Nic Cabañero considers Lapu-Lapu City as his hometown, his parents traces their roots to Inabanga, Bohol.

Nic Cabañero was convinced to study at the University of San Carlos North Campus for elementary by its sports coordinator coach Largo Galimar in 2014. He became part of USC–NC's elementary boys' basketball team.

For high school, he entered the Sacred Heart School – Ateneo de Cebu (SHS-AdC) before moving to the San Beda University in 2018. In 2020, he moved to the University of Santo Tomas High School.

At the collegiate level, he attended the University of Santo Tomas, obtaining a degree in marketing management in 2025.

== Career ==
=== High school ===
In high school, Cabañero first suited up for the SHS-AdC Magis Eagles. He later became part of the San Beda Red Cubs of the National Collegiate Athletic Association (NCAA) in 2018. He was a part of the Red Cubs who won the NCAA Season 95 championship in 2019.

In 2020, Cabañero moved to the University of Santo Tomas High School. He was to suit up for the UST Tiger Cubs Season 83 in the University Athletic Association of the Philippines (UAAP) but the junior tournament was cancelled due to the COVID-19 pandemic.

=== Collegiate ===
Cabañero eventually played at the collegiate level in the UAAP. His team, the UST Growling Tigers, struggled in his first two years with UST. In his rookie year in Season 84 in 2021, the Tigers under coach Jino Manansala ended with 3–11 win-lose record. In Season 85 in 2022, UST mentored by Bal David only won one out of 14 games. Pido Jarencio took over UST as coach for Season 86. However the team ended with a 2–12 record.

Cabañero however was able to help UST reach the Final Four in his last two years in Seasons 87 and 88 (2024 and 2025). He was named part of the Mythical Team for both seasons.

He also played 3x3 basketball in the UAAP, helping UST win Season 84.

=== Club ===
After graduating from UST, Cabañero looked to join the Korean Basketball League (KBL) or the Maharlika Pilipinas Basketball League (MPBL). He also plans to play in the Philippine Basketball Association (PBA) but the next PBA draft he can join is still in 2027.

Cabañero eventually joined the Biñan Tatak Gel of the MPBL in January 2026. His first stint with Binan was at the 2026 MPBL Preseason Invitational. He later made his debut in the 2026 regular season in April. On September 10, Cabañero scored 53 points in a game against Pasig City, breaking the record for most points scores in a single MPBL game, surpassing Jeff Viernes' 50-point game from 2023.

On November 13, 2026, following Biñan's elimination after the 2026 MPBL South Division finals, Cabañero confirmed his declaration for the PBA season 51 draft.

=== 3x3 national team ===
Cabañero is also a 3x3 basketball player and he has been part of the Philippine national 3x3 team. He was part of the youth team which played in the 2025 FIBA 3×3 Youth Nations League – Asia Pacific in Qatar. He is part of the senior squad which took part in the 2026 Asian Beach Games in Sanya, China.

== Personal life ==
Cabañero's younger brother Andwele is also a basketball player.
