= Abra Weavers =

Professional basketball team in Abra, Philippines

- 2026 Abra Weavers season
- League: MPBL; EASL
- Founded: 2024; 2 years ago
- History: Abra Weavers; 2024–present
- Arena: Gov. Andres Bernos Memorial Gym (MPBL); SM Seaside Cebu Arena (EASL)
- Location: Bangued
- Team colors
- Main sponsor: Solid North Partylist
- Head coach: Yong Garcia
- Championships: 1 (2025)
- Conference titles: 2 (2025, 2026)

The Abra Weavers (known as the Abra Solid North Weavers for sponsorship reasons) are a Philippine professional basketball team based in Bangued, Abra. The team competes in the Maharlika Pilipinas Basketball League (MPBL) as a member of the league's North Division. The Weavers plays its home games at the Gov. Andres Bernos Memorial Gym on the campus of the University of Abra.

The Weavers won the MPBL championship in 2025 with a roster led by players such as Dave Ildefonso and Jason Brickman. In 2026, the Weavers became the first MPBL representative in the East Asia Super League.

== History ==
The Cordillera region as a whole did not have much history in terms of hosting pro basketball. Their only notable hosting was the 2007 PBA All-Star Weekend, where the main game was hosted at the University of Baguio in Baguio.

On February 2, 2024, then-La Paz mayor and former congressman Joseph Bernos announced on social media that the province of Abra would enter the Maharlika Pilipinas Basketball League for the 2024 season. On February 20, the team's name was announced as the 'Abra Weavers'. The Weavers are one of two expansion teams that season, the other being the Pangasinan Heatwaves.

=== 2024–present: Immediate success ===
To begin their inaugural season, the team acquired the likes of Mac Tallo and Mark Yee. Abra faced Pangasinan in their inaugural game on April 6, 2024 as the visiting team. They beat the home team Heatwaves, 83–75. The team's organization was involved in an altercation with game officials on April 18 following the team's loss to the home team Pasay Voyagers at Cuneta Astrodome. The league launched an investigation on the matter, though the verdict remains undisclosed. On June 15, the team played their first home game at the University of Abra, a win against the Rizal Golden Coolers.

The Weavers finished their inaugural season 18–10, ranked 7th in the North Division, and thus clinching a playoff berth in their inaugural season. Unfortunately, they would end up getting swept in the division quarterfinals to the eventual back-to-back champion Pampanga Giant Lanterns.

For the 2025 season, the Weavers acquired Encho Serrano from the Pampanga Giant Lanterns as well as Dave Ildefonso, who was left unsigned after getting drafted by the NorthPort Batang Pier. Multiple college recruits were also signed to the Weavers. In June 2025, the team added former MPBL Finals MVP Mike Ayonayon alongside Simon Camacho and Geo Chiu, but also released Paul Desiderio.

Following the East Asia Super League's (EASL) announcement of its new partnership with the MPBL in August 2026, the Abra Weavers were slotted as the Philippines' representatives for the 2026–27 EASL season. The MPBL replaces the Philippine Basketball Association in the EASL.

== Current roster ==
Abra Weavers roster
Players

Pos.	No.	Name	Height	Weight	DOB	From
G/F	0	Shaun Idlefonso	6 ft 2 in (1.88 m)	198 lb (90 kg)	1997–09–30	National-U
G/F	1	Dave Ildefonso	6 ft 2 in (1.88 m)		2000–04–14	Ateneo
G	2	Encho Serrano	6 ft 0 in (1.83 m)	176 lb (80 kg)	1999–09–18	De La Salle
G	3	Harley Baldo (HG)	5 ft 9 in (1.75 m)
G	4	Nico Elorde	5 ft 10 in (1.78 m)	155 lb (70 kg)	1991–10–04	Ateneo
G	4	Marwin Taywan	5 ft 9 in (1.75 m)		1988–07–08	Emilio Aguinaldo
F	5	Tucker Molina (FF, HG)	6 ft 6 in (1.98 m)			Arizona Christian
G	6	Kascius Small-Martin (FF)	6 ft 1 in (1.85 m)		1998–02–28	Brock
G	8	Mike Ayonayon	6 ft 0 in (1.83 m)	170 lb (77 kg)	1992–12–08	Philippine Christian
F	9	Raven Gonzales	6 ft 7 in (2.01 m)		2002-10-23	De La Salle
F	11	Joshua Asuncion (HG)	6 ft 3 in (1.91 m)
G	12	Will Keane Lee (HG)	6 ft 0 in (1.83 m)
G	13	Georell Gonzales (HG)	6 ft 1 in (1.85 m)
F	15	DJ Fenner (FF)	6 ft 6 in (1.98 m)	210 lb (95 kg)	1993–12–07	Nevada
G/F	17	Jay Yutuc (HG)	6 ft 2 in (1.88 m)
G	21	Ernest Felicilda	5 ft 7 in (1.70 m)			UP
F	23	Redel Fabro (HG)	6 ft 1 in (1.85 m)			Olivarez
F	24	John Uduba	6 ft 4 in (1.93 m)			Olivarez
G/F	25	Jake Figueroa	6 ft 3 in (1.91 m)		2002–04–20	National-U
F/C	30	Alfred Batino	6 ft 5 in (1.96 m)			Cebu
G	33	JD Cagulangan	5 ft 8 in (1.73 m)		2000–01–24	UP
C	88	Drex Delos Reyes	6 ft 8 in (2.03 m)		2004–06–24	Mapúa
C	–	Malick Diouf (EA)	6 ft 11 in (2.11 m)		1999–02–25	UP
C	–	Michael Eric (EA)	6 ft 11 in (2.11 m)		1988–06–24	Temple

Coaches

Head coach

- Yong Garcia

Assistant coach(es)

- Denok Miranda
- Don Urro
- Nani Epondulan
- Joaqui Garcia
- Jerry Andaleon
- Edsel Vallena
- Carl Reyes

Team manager

- Christopher Conwi
- Waylon Nibaten (assistant)

Legend

- (HG) Homegrown
- (FF) Filipino-foreigner
- (EA) EASL player
- (RS) Reserve player
- (S) Suspended
- Injured

=== Head coaches ===
Abra Solid North Weavers head coaches
#	Name	Start	End	Achievements	Ref.
1	Jonathan Banal	2024	2024	—	
2	Yong Garcia	2024	current	1x MPBL Coach of the Year (2025)	

== Notable players ==
=== Award winners ===
Most Valuable Player

- Dave Ildefonso – 2025

Finals Most Valuable Player

- Jason Brickman – 2025

=== PBA players ===
Ex-PBA players

- Mike Ayonayon
- Anthony Bringas
- Simon Camacho
- Prince Caperal (returned to PBA)
- Paul Desiderio
- Nico Elorde
- Leo Najorda
- Encho Serrano
- Yousef Taha
- Mark Yee

Drafted to PBA

- Geo Chiu – 1st overall, season 50
- Jason Brickman – 7th overall, season 50
- CJ Austria – 16th overall, season 50
- Joshua David – 24th overall, season 50
- Jack Cruz-Dumont – 27th overall, season 50

== Season-by-season records ==
League champions
Division champions
Qualified for playoffs
Best regular season record

Season	Regular season							Playoffs	
Season	Division	Finish	GP	W	L	PCT	GB	Stage	Results
Abra Weavers
2024	North	7th	28	18	10	.517	8	Division quarterfinals	lost vs. Pampanga, 0–2
Abra Solid North Weavers
2025	North	1st	29	28	1	.966	—	Division quarterfinals Division semifinals Division finals National finals	won vs. Ilagan Isabela, 2–0 won vs. Caloocan, 2–0 won vs. Pangasinan, 3–0 won vs. Quezon, 3–0
2026	North	1st	25	23	2	.920	—	Division quarterfinals Division semifinals Division finals National finals	won vs. Quezon City, 2–0 won vs. Pasay, 2–0 won vs. San Juan, 3–0; TBD vs. Quezon
All-time regular season record			82	69	13	.841		3 playoff appearances	
All-time playoff record			19	17	2	.895		2 finals appearance	
All-time overall record			101	86	15	.851		1 championships	
