= University of Abra =

Public university in Abra, Philippines

- Former names: Lagangilang Farm School; Lagangilang Agricultural School; Lagangilang National Agricultural School; Lagangilang Agricultural College; Abra State Institute of Sciences and Technology (1983–2021)
- Type: State university
- Established: 1908; 118 years ago
- President: Gregorio T. Turqueza Jr.
- Vice-president: Noel B. Begnalen (Academic Affairs)
- Location: Lagangilang, Abra, Philippines; 17°36′42″N 120°43′56″E
- Campus: Lagangilang; Bangued
- Nickname: Buffaloes
- Mascot: Buffalo
- Website: www.asist.edu.ph
- Location within Luzon Location within Philippines

The University of Abra (UAbra), formerly the Abra State Institute of Sciences and Technology (ASIST), is a public state-funded university in Abra, Philippines. Its main campus is located in Lagangilang, with satellite campuses in La Paz and the provincial capital, Bangued.

ASIST was converted into a university through Republic Act No. 11574, also known as the University of Abra Law, which was approved on July 23, 2021.

The Gov. Andres B. Bernos Memorial Gymnasium at the Bangued campus serves as the home venue of the Maharlika Pilipinas Basketball League (MPBL) team Abra Weavers.

Previous badge used until 2021 while under the name ASIST.
