= Jake Figueroa =

Filipino basketball player

No. 25 – Abra Weavers
- Position: Small forward / shooting guard
- League: MPBL

Personal information
- Born: April 20, 2002 (age 24) Minalin, Pampanga, Philippines
- Listed height: 6 ft 3 in (1.91 m)

Career information
- High school: Adamson (Manila)
- College: NU (2021–2025)
- Playing career: 2025–present

Career history
- 2025–2026: Ulsan Hyundai Mobis Phoebus
- 2026–present: Abra Weavers

Career highlights
- UAAP Elite Team (2025); AsiaBasket champion (2024 International); AsiaBasket First Team (2024 International)

Johnkimwell "Jake" Figueroa (born April 20, 2002) is a Filipino professional basketball player for the Abra Weavers in the Maharlika Pilipinas Basketball League (MPBL). He played college basketball for the National University (NU) Bulldogs in the University Athletic Association of the Philippines (UAAP). Before his collegiate career, he was named the UAAP Juniors Most Valuable Player (MVP) in Season 82 while playing for Adamson University.

== Early life and high school ==
Figueroa is from Minalin, Pampanga. He played high school basketball for the Adamson University Baby Falcons. In UAAP Season 82, he was awarded the Juniors Most Valuable Player award.

== Collegiate career ==
Figueroa committed to play for the National University (NU) Bulldogs under head coach Jeff Napa. In UAAP Season 87, the team finished in seventh place.

=== UAAP Season 88 ===
In UAAP Season 88, Figueroa served as the team captain for the Bulldogs. He led the team to an 11–3 record in the elimination round, securing the number one seed and a twice-to-beat advantage for the Final Four.

During the season opener, Figueroa recorded 16 points, six rebounds, five steals, and two blocks in a 72–57 win against University of the East (UE). Against the University of Santo Tomas (UST) on October 1, 2025, he scored a season-high 22 points, including a crucial three-pointer in the final minute to secure a 76–69 victory. In a game against De La Salle University on October 12, Figueroa scored 18 points and grabbed eight rebounds in an 82–78 win, handing La Salle their third loss in four games. On October 26, despite feeling ill, he tallied 17 points and 15 rebounds to help NU defeat Ateneo de Manila University 66–50.

Figueroa made several game-winning plays in the second round of eliminations. He scored the winning basket with 10.9 seconds left against Adamson University to win 66–65, confirming NU's Final Four berth. In a subsequent match against Far Eastern University, he scored 17 points and hit a clutch three-pointer with 73 seconds remaining to secure a 70–64 victory. Due to his performance in the critical stages of the eliminations, he was named the Collegiate Press Corps Player of the Week for the period of November 5 to 16.

In the Final Four, the top-seeded Bulldogs held a twice-to-beat advantage but were eliminated by the fourth-seeded De La Salle Green Archers after losing two consecutive games. Figueroa recorded a double-double of 20 points and 10 rebounds in the first game, which NU lost 87–77. In his final collegiate game, he posted 21 points, six rebounds, and five assists in a 78–73 loss. He finished the season with averages of 13.9 points, 7.2 rebounds, 3.9 assists, 2.1 steals, and 1.0 block per game. He was subsequently named to the UAAP Season 88 Mythical Team.

== Professional career ==
Following the conclusion of his collegiate career, Figueroa attracted interest from overseas scouts. On December 12, 2025, it was announced that he signed with the Ulsan Hyundai Mobis Phoebus in the Korean Basketball League (KBL). He joined the team as an Asian Quota player, replacing Miguel "Migs" Oczon.

== Player profile ==
Figueroa is a 6-foot-3 forward known for his versatility and two-way play. He has been described as a "do-it-all" player who contributes in scoring, rebounding, assists, and defense.
