= Dave Ildefonso =

Filipino basketball player

No. 1 – Abra Weavers
- Position: Shooting guard / small forward
- League: MPBL

Personal information
- Born: April 14, 2000 (age 26)
- Listed height: 6 ft 2 in (188 cm)
- Listed weight: 190 lb (86 kg)

Career information
- High school: Ateneo (Quezon City)
- College: NU; Ateneo
- PBA draft: 2024: 1st round, 5th overall pick
- Drafted by: NorthPort Batang Pier
- Playing career: 2023–present

Career history
- 2023–2024: Suwon KT Sonicboom
- 2025–present: Abra Solid North Weavers

Career highlights
- MPBL champion (2025); MPBL Most Valuable Player (2025); All-MPBL First Team (2025); MPBL All-Star Game Most Valuable Player (2026); 2× MPBL All-Star (2025, 2026); UAAP champion (2022)

Sean Dave Geroy Ildefonso (born April 14, 2000) is a Filipino professional basketball player for the Abra Weavers of the Maharlika Pilipinas Basketball League (MPBL). He is the younger child of PBA great Danny Ildefonso, thus he is nicknamed "Dave I" in reference to "Danny I".

Ildefonso played for the Ateneo de Manila University Blue Eaglets in high school before transferring to National University in 2018 to play for the Bulldogs. In 2020, he went back to Ateneo where we would play the rest of his collegiate career.

He then began his professional career in 2023 in the Korean Basketball League (KBL), playing for the Suwon KT Sonicboom. In 2024, he was selected with the fifth overall pick by the NorthPort Batang Pier in the Philippine Basketball Association (PBA) season 49 draft. Ildefonso and NorthPort weren't able to agree on a contract, which eventually left Dave unsigned and getting picked up by the MPBL's Abra Weavers.

He also played for the Philippines national team in international competitions at both the youth and senior level.

== High school and college career ==
In high school, Ildefonso was a member of the Ateneo Blue Eaglets, where he won the UAAP juniors championship in 2018 during Season 80, defeating National University's NU Bullpups in three games.

Afterwards, he committed to playing for NU to begin his college career, where he joined his father, Danny Ildefonso, who is NU's assistant coach. Two years later, in 2020, he went back to Ateneo where he won a championship in Season 85 in 2022, his final season with the Blue Eagles. Ateneo coach Tab Baldwin praised Dave I for his defensive performance after the culminating game 3.

== Professional career ==
=== Suwon KT Sonicboom (2023–2024) ===
Before Ildefonso played his final year with Ateneo, he was contacted by teams from the B.League and Korean Basketball League to play overseas, but he declined any interest of playing for them at the time. He was ready the following year, however, as Ildefonso entered the professional level with the KBL's Suwon KT Sonicboom in 2023. He was later replaced by Filipino-Italian Dalph Panopio as the team's Asian import.

=== Contract issues with NorthPort Batang Pier (2024) ===
On July 2, 2024, Ildefonso declared for the PBA season 49 draft, where he would go on to be selected by the NorthPort Batang Pier with the fifth pick. Despite optimism between both Ildefonso and NorthPort, they weren't able to agree to a deal, despite being initially offered a two-year max contract by the team. NorthPort head coach Bonnie Tan also denied of the possibility of the team trading him out. Danny I, who became an assistant coach for the Converge FiberXers, commented on a Facebook discussion regarding his son's contract situation, specifically mentioning "farm team" in his comments. The older Ildefonso would later be fined ₱20,000 by commissioner Willie Marcial.

=== Abra Solid North Weavers (2025–present) ===
Ildefonso's fallout with NorthPort meant that he was left unsigned, and on February 7, 2025, he signed a deal with the Abra Weavers of the Maharlika Pilipinas Basketball League, with his contract reported to be worth ₱420,000 per month for three years. Dave, in an interview with SPIN.ph, stated that he still wanted to play in the PBA, hoping that he can settle on a deal with NorthPort after his MPBL stint due to the team still having his PBA rights. Ildefonso made his debut for Abra on March 9, 2025, the opening day of the 2025 MPBL season.

On October 24, his PBA signing rights (now held by NorthPort's successor, Titan Ultra Giant Risers) were traded to the Converge FiberXers in exchange for Kobe Monje and Converge's second-round pick in season 51 and first-round pick in season 52.

== Personal life ==
Dave is also the younger brother of Shaun Ildefonso, who previously played for the Rain or Shine Elasto Painters.
