= Kean Baclaan =

Filipino basketball player (born 2003)

No. 0 – Caloocan Batang Kankaloo
- Position: Point guard
- League: MPBL

Personal information
- Born: January 2, 2003 (age 23) Muntinlupa, Philippines
- Listed height: 5 ft 7 in (1.70 m)

Career information
- High school: De La Salle Zobel (Muntinlupa)
- College: NU; De La Salle
- Playing career: 2026–present

Career history
- 2026–present: Caloocan Batang Kankaloo

Career highlights
- MPBL All-Star (2026); AsiaBasket champion (College Campus Tour 2025); UAAP champion (2025)

Kean Baclaan (born January 2, 2003) is a Filipino professional basketball player for the Caloocan Batang Kankaloo of the Maharlika Pilipinas Basketball League (MPBL).

Baclaan played for the De La Salle Zobel Junior Archers in high school, before joining the National University (NU) Bulldogs in 2022 to start his college career. After two years, he moved to De La Salle University, where he won a championship with the Green Archers in UAAP Season 88 (2025).

In 2026, he turned pro after signing with the Caloocan Batang Kankaloo of the Maharlika Pilipinas Basketball League.

== College career ==
On August 21, 2022, Baclaan committed to play for the NU Bulldogs to start his college career, coming off his high school career with the Zobel Junior Archers. He previously played for the UST Growling Tigers in the PBA D-League and the Filoil EcoOil Preseason Cup, but never enrolled at UST, allowing him to play for NU in UAAP Season 85. On January 25, 2024, Baclaan departed NU after two seasons in Jhocson.

On February 3, Baclaan moved to the De La Salle Green Archers, where he would begin play starting in UAAP Season 88 in 2025. The move marked his return to the De La Salle Philippines system after his high school days at Zobel. On October 16, 2025, in his sixth game with the Green Archers, Baclaan suffered a medial collateral ligament (MCL) injury following an accident with Wello Lingolingo of the UE Red Warriors during the fourth quarter. Originally declared a season-ending injury, on November 28, Baclaan confirmed that he would return in time for De La Salle's Final Four run, which came on December 3 against his former team at NU. This would culminate with him winning his first and only UAAP championship.

On January 28, 2026, Baclaan announced that he would forgo his final year of eligibility with De La Salle to enter the professional scene. The decision came from his need to support his family.

== Professional career ==
=== Caloocan Batang Kankaloo (2026–present) ===
On February 2, 2026, Baclaan signed with the Caloocan Batang Kankaloo of the regional Maharlika Pilipinas Basketball League. He previously played for the organization during his time in the 21-under Junior MPBL D-League.
