= Jacob Cortez =

Filipino basketball player (born 2002)

No. 11 – De La Salle Green Archers
- Position: Point guard
- League: UAAP

Personal information
- Born: June 8, 2002 (age 24)
- Listed height: 5 ft 11 in (1.80 m)

Career information
- High school: La Salle Green Hills (Mandaluyong); UST (Manila)
- College: San Beda (2021–2023); De La Salle (2025–present)

Career highlights
- UAAP men's champion (2025); NCAA men's champion (2023); NCAA men's Mythical Team (2023)

Jacob Zion Refuerzo Cortez (born June 8, 2002) is a Filipino college basketball player who plays for the De La Salle Green Archers of the University Athletic Association of the Philippines (UAAP). He has won a championship in the NCAA with the San Beda Red Lions, and similar to his father Mike, in the UAAP with La Salle.

== Early life and high school career ==
Cortez was born to Joy Refuerzo and Mike Cortez, a Filipino-American PBA basketball player.

Cortez first played for the La Salle Green Hills Greenies in the NCAA Juniors division. In a game against the Letran Squires, he made the game-winning triple as the Greenies finished as the first seed for the Season 94 (2018) Final Four. The Greenies made it to the finals, where they lost to the Mapua Red Robins.

In order to gain attention from UAAP schools, Cortez then played for the UST Tiger Cubs in the UAAP juniors division. Playing for them only in Season 82 (2019), the Tiger Cubs did not make the playoffs. In his lone season with the team, he was their second leading scorer with averages of 15.9 points, 5.7 rebounds, and 3.1 assists. He was also ranked 15th on the NBTC 24 high school rankings in 2020.

During the COVID-19 pandemic, the Cortez family moved back to the States. He decided not to play college basketball in the States, but instead return to the Philippines. However, the UST Growling Tigers were embroiled in their own controversy so he decided to commit to another school. He tried to commit to the De La Salle Green Archers, but their coach at the time, Derrick Pumaren, chose to recruit another player over him. On August 4, 2021, he committed to the San Beda Red Lions in the NCAA. He also promised to bring San Beda a championship.

== College career ==
=== San Beda Red Lions ===
Cortez started as a reserve player on the Red Lions' roster for Season 97. He joined the Red Lions' roster later in the elimination rounds, and debuted with seven points and two assists over the Benilde Blazers. He also contributed in the playoffs as he scored 13 points and four rebounds in a Game One win over the Mapúa Cardinals. The Cardinals then won the following game and prevented the Lions from making the finals. The following season, Season 98, Cortez had his breakout game with an NCAA career-high 15 points, four rebounds, and two assists in a win over the JRU Heavy Bombers. However, San Beda lost in the Final Four to Benilde that season.

In the offseason, Cortez led San Beda to the 2023 AsiaBasket International Championship finals, where they lost to Kuala Lumpur Aseel. San Beda also played in the 2023 PBA D-League Aspirants' Cup. However, before the start of Season 99, San Beda lost all of their starters for various reasons, with three transferring to a different school. This made Cortez San Beda's starting point guard. DLSU was also trying to recruit him, but he stayed for another season to fulfill his promise to San Beda.

In the first game of Season 99, Cortez led with 16 points on four three-pointers, dished out five assists, and recorded two steals in a win over the Arellano Chiefs. He scored less the following game, but bounced back with 20 points, six rebounds, and three assists in a win over Benilde. Against the Lyceum Pirates, he scored 23 points (with 11 coming in the fourth quarter), but they still lost and head coach Yuri Escueta was also ejected from the game. Without their head coach, Cortez led them to a bounce back win over JRU with 24 points. He then contributed with a game-high three blocks alongside 10 points, five rebounds, and four assists in a win over the San Sebastian Stags. After starting the season in the top four in the standings, San Beda lost four of its next five games, dropping to fifth. San Beda snapped their losing streak against Benilde, in which he contributed 15 points, four rebounds, and eight assists despite suffering from an illness. They went on to finish third overall with a 12–6 record.

In the Final Four, San Beda faced second seed Lyceum, who had a twice-to-beat advantage. In Game 1, Cortez extended San Beda's season with a win over Lyceum, in which he scored a career-high 28 points alongside eight assists, four rebounds, and three steals. For Game 2, Lyceum's defense limited him to seven points, but his teammates stepped up to upset Lyceum. This win brought San Beda back into the finals, this time against Mapúa. In Game 1, he struggled with his shooting, going 3-for-17 with 12 points as Mapúa won a close game. He and the team bounced back in Game 2, with him leading with 21 points, nine rebounds, three assists, and two steals to force a deciding Game 3. On December 17, 2023, San Beda won Game 3, claiming the title. This was San Beda's first title since 2018. For that season, he averaged 15.4 points, 3.7 rebounds, 3.7 assists, and 1.2 steals.

=== De La Salle Green Archers ===
After winning the NCAA title, DLSU once again recruited him. This time, he accepted their offer, having completed his promise to the San Beda community. On January 11, 2024, Cortez announced on social media that he would be leaving San Beda and switching to DLSU. This time, he would be playing for head coach Topex Robinson. He joined a recruiting class that also included transferees Kean Baclaan, Mason Amos, and Luis Pablo. With all of them undergoing residency, they watched as the UP Fighting Maroons won Season 87, motivating them to try to reclaim the championship the following season. They also played together in the preseason, winning the 2025 AsiaBasket College Campus Tour.

Cortez debuted for DLSU in Season 88 with 16 points, four rebounds, four assists, and two steals, with the go-ahead bucket and the game-winning assist against the Adamson Soaring Falcons. He wore the same jersey his father wore for DLSU, #11. In a game against the UE Red Warriors, Baclaan went down with an injury late in the fourth quarter and DLSU down five. Cortez then stepped up for Baclaan and led a come-from-behind win over UE. He scored 26 points (16 coming after Baclaan's injury), five assists, four steals, and two rebounds. He then had 12 points, six assists, five rebounds, and two steals in a win over the UP Fighting Maroons, stepping up for Baclaan and Amos, who had also gotten injured during the season. For his performances, he was awarded as the UAAP's Player of the Week. DLSU finished with an 8–6 win-loss record in the eliminations after he led a clutch win over the Ateneo Blue Eagles.

In Game 2 of the Final Four, Cortez scored a career-high 29 points against the top-seeded NU Bulldogs, sending DLSU to the finals against UP. In Game 1 of the finals, he made a clutch three pointer that sealed DLSU's win. On December 17, 2025, two years after he won in the NCAA, La Salle won Game 3, 80–72, making DLSU Season 88 champions. This made him one of the few players to win a title in both the UAAP and the NCAA.

== Personal life ==
Cortez has a younger brother, Mikey, who is also a player of the DLSU Green Archers.
