= Mon Jose =

Filipino basketball player and coach

Magnolia Chicken Timplados Hotshots
- Title: Assistant coach
- League: PBA

Personal information
- Listed height: 6 ft 1 in (1.85 m)

Career information
- College: De La Salle
- PBA draft: 2001: 3rd round, 24th overall pick
- Drafted by: Pop Cola Panthers
- Playing career: 2001–2001
- Position: Point guard / shooting guard
- Number: 22
- Coaching career: 2002–present

Career history

Playing
- 2001: Pop Cola Panthers

Coaching
- 2003–2005: De La Salle (women)
- 2005–2008: Benilde (assistant)
- 2005–2007: Coca-Cola Tigers (assistant)
- 2008–2010: Hapee Fresh Fighters (assistant)
- 2009–2011: CEU (women)
- 2009: Philippines U-17 youth (assistant)
- 2010: Philippines 3x3 youth
- 2010–2016: NU (men) (assistant)
- 2002; 2014–present: Magnolia Chicken Timplados Hotshots (assistant)
- 2021–present: De La Salle (men) (assistant)

Career highlights
- As assistant coach: 3x PBA champion (2002 Governors', 2014 Governors', 2018 Governors'); 3x PBA D-League champion (2022 Aspirants' Cup, 2023 Aspirants' Cup, 2024 Aspirants' Cup); AsiaBasket champion (2025 College Campus Tour); 3x UAAP champion (2014, 2023, 2025); As player: 3x UAAP champion (1998, 1999, 2000)

Ramon "Mon" Jose is a Filipino basketball coach who serving as one of the three assistant coaches under Chito Victolero of the Magnolia Chicken Timplados Hotshots in the PBA.

== Education ==
He also played for the De La Salle Green Archers from 1997 to 2000 under Franz Pumaren. Coached by Franz Pumaren, he played with Renren Ritualo, future San Juan Mayor Francis Zamora, Don Allado, and Dino Aldeguer who made a famous crucial shot in 1999 UAAP Basketball finals game 3.

== Playing career ==
Jose was drafted by Pop Cola Panthers in the PBA, but only played for one season after Panthers was disbanded. He tried to try-out a spot for Purefoods, but failed.

== Coaching career ==
Jose coached a lot of teams, including the De La Salle Women’s Team, Centro Escolar University Men’s Basketball Team and the RP Youth Team (3 on 3 Basketball) which participated in the 1st Youth Olympic Games in 2010.

He also served as an assistant College of Saint Benilde Blazers as well as Hapee Toothpaste for the Philippine Basketball League and Coca-Cola Tigers under Binky Favis at the PBA.

From 2010, became an assistant coach for National University Bulldogs and won a UAAP championship on 2014.

In 2014, he was tapped as assistant coach for the Star Hotshots, with another former Green Archers Jason Webb and Tonyboy Espinosa.

When Derrick Pumaren returned to La Salle, Jose was one of the assistant coaches tapped in.
