= Gian Nazario =

Filipino basketball coach

De La Salle Green Archers
- Position: Assistant coach
- League: UAAP

Career information
- High school: De La Salle Zobel
- College: DLSU
- Coaching career: 2019–present

Career history

Coaching
- 2019–2020: De La Salle
- 2020–present: De La Salle (assistant)
- 2021–2023: Terrafirma Dyip (assistant)
- 2025–present: DLSZ HS

Career highlights
- As assistant coach: 3x PBA D-League champion (2022 Aspirants's Cup, 2023 Aspirants' Cup, 2024 Aspirants' Cup); AsiaBasket champion (2025 College Campus Tour); 2× UAAP men's champion (2023, 2025)

Gian Nazario is a Filipino professional basketball coach who currently serves as an assistant coach for the De La Salle Green Archers of the University Athletic Association of the Philippines (UAAP).

== Career ==
Nazario is the head coach the De La Salle Green Archers for two seasons, with Jermaine Byrd as active consultant. After Byrd left, he was demoted to assistant coach.

Nazario also worked for Terrafirma Dyip as an assistant coach since 2021.
