= Mike Phillips (basketball, born 2002) =

Filipino basketball player

Kyoto Hannaryz
- Position: Power forward / center
- League: B.League

Personal information
- Born: July 5, 2002 (age 24) United States
- Listed height: 6 ft 8 in (2.03 m)

Career information
- High school: Creekside (St. Johns County, Florida)
- College: De La Salle (2022–2025)
- Playing career: 2026–present

Career history
- 2026: San Juan Knights
- 2026–present: Kyoto Hannaryz

Career highlights
- 3x PBA D-League champion (2022 Aspirants' Cup, 2023 Aspirants' Cup, 2024 Aspirants' Cup); PBA D-League Aspirants' Cup MVP (2024); AsiaBasket champion (2025 College Campus Tour); AsiaBasket MVP (2025 College Campus Tour); 2× UAAP champion (2023, 2025); UAAP Mythical Team (2022); UAAP Finals MVP (2025)
Medals
Men's basketball
Representing Philippines
SEA Games
Gold medal – first place	2023 Cambodia	Team

Michael Phillips (born July 5, 2002) is a Filipino-American professional basketball player for the Kyoto Hannaryz of the Japan B.League. He played his entire college career with the De La Salle Green Archers, where he won two UAAP men's basketball championships. From his college career, Mike was given the moniker "Motor Mike".

== Early life and education ==
Mike Phillips was born on July 5, 2002, in Fairfield, Ohio, a suburb of Cincinnati, Ohio. He grew up in Fairfield until his high school years when he moved to Florida in the United States. He attended Creekside High School. He moved to the Philippines in 2019 to attend the De La Salle University pursuing a degree in marketing management.

== High school and college career ==
Phillips played 19 games for the Creekside Knights, averaging 12.9 points, 11.2 rebounds, 1.7 assists, 1.6 steals, and 1.4 blocks.

Phillips played for the De La Salle Green Archers in the University Athletic Association of the Philippines (UAAP) and was known by the moniker "Motor Mike". He debuted in Season 84 in 2022. He was named to the UAAP Mythical Team for that season. He later helped his school win two UAAP men's basketball championships in Season 86 (2023) and Seasons 88 (2025). He was also named Finals MVP in Season 88.

He also led La Salle in the 2025 World University Basketball Series in Japan.

== Professional career ==
=== San Juan Knights (2026) ===
On April 1, 2026, Phillips signed with the San Juan Knights of the regional Maharlika Pilipinas Basketball League.

On July 11, older brother Ben disclosed that Mike has stepped down from San Juan to focus on recovery following his call-up in the 2027 FIBA Basketball World Cup Asia qualifiers. He also stated that Mike received multiple opportunities from other professional teams. His departure was confirmed the following day. Phillips activated an opt-opt clause to terminate his contract. San Juan team manager Jun Usman says his departure came out as a surprise learning the move from Mike's brother and did not give the San Juan Knights management a chance to convince Mike to stay.

=== Kyoto Hannaryz (2026–present) ===
On July 21, 2026, Phillips signed with Kyoto Hannaryz of the Japanese B.League for the 2026–27 season.

== National team career ==
Phillips has publicly expressed his availability to play for the Philippine national team as early as 2022. However he reportedly was unable to obtain a Philippine passport by age 16 rendering him a restricted or "naturalized" player under FIBA eligibility rules. He played for the Philippine national team which won the gold medal at the men's basketball tournament of the 2023 SEA Games in Cambodia. In February 2026, FIBA has reclassified Phillips as a local or unrestricted player. On June 18, 2026, Phillips got his first call-up to the national team for the third window of Asia qualifiers for the 2027 FIBA Basketball World Cup.

== Personal life ==
Phillips traces his Filipino heritage from his grandmother Carmelita Colina who hails from Cebu City. He is also vocal about his Christian faith which guides his basketball career. Despite being born abroad, he is noted for his fluency in speaking the Filipino language. His older brothers Benjamin and Isaiah are also basketball players and have also suited up for the Green Archers.
