= Ferdinand Damanik =

Indonesian basketball player

Personal information
- Born: April 15, 1988 (age 38) Bekasi, Indonesia
- Listed height: 6 ft 5 in (1.96 m)
- Listed weight: 220 lb (100 kg)

Career information
- High school: La Salle Green Hills (Mandaluyong, Philippines)
- College: De La Salle
- Playing career: 2012–2017
- Position: Center
- Number: 24

Career history
- 2012–2013: Pelita Jaya Esia
- 2013–2016: Dell Aspac Jakarta
- 2016–2017: JNE Bandung Utama

Career highlights
- NBL Indonesia champion (2014); IBL All-Star (2017); UAAP champion (2007)
Medals
Men's basketball
Representing Indonesia
Islamic Solidarity Games
| Bronze medal – third place | 2013 Palembang | Team |

Ferdinand Damanik (born April 15, 1988) is a former Indonesian professional basketball player. He played college basketball for the De La Salle Green Archers of the University Athletic Association of the Philippines (UAAP).

== College ==
After a standout high school career at La Salle Green Hills, Ferdinand joined the De La Salle Green Archers. Under the direction of Coach Franz Pumaren, in his first year in the UAAP Basketball Championship he won the 2007-2008 season.

== First season NBL ==
In his first season in the NBL Indonesia 2012–2013 season, Damanik played for Pelita Jaya Esia. He managed to make his team the runner-up in the NBL Indonesia 2012–2013 season. In 2013 Damanik entered the NBL Indonesia slam dunk contest. But still not a champion. In this season Damanik decided to exchange with the players in the Dell Aspac Jakarta Anggi Arizki because of an internal problem with coach Nathaniel Canson.

In February of the 2014-2015 NBL Season, Damanik scored a career high 23 points and 7 rebound to help Aspac beat Satria Muda 85–76. Aspac qualified for the championship series, but lost to Stadium Jakarta 65–67. Damanik had a double-double – 10 points and grab 10 rebounds but wasn't enough to take Aspac to the final four.

Damanik's contract expired before the start of 2017 season. He chose to sign with JNE Bandung Utama and was selected to participate at the All Star game that season.

In 2017, Damanik was banned from the Indonesian Basketball League after allegedly being involved in match-fixing.

== Walikota Cup ==
Joined Familia BC in the 2016 Walikota cup, he managed to bring his team was runner-up in the tournament after losing to Mawar Sharon Eagles.

== International ==
Ferdinand debuted with the Indonesian national basketball team in 2013. In that same year, Ferdinand participated in the Islamic Solidarity Games where his team managed to win a bronze medal. Ferdinand was also part of the national team that participated in the 2013 SEA Games in Myanmar.
