= Jermaine Byrd =

American basketball coach

Career information
- College: University of Sioux Falls
- Coaching career: 2011–2020

Career history

Coaching
- 2011–2012: Tulsa 66ers (assistant)
- 2012–2013: Sioux Falls Skyforce (assistant)
- 2014–2016: Los Angeles D-Fenders (assistant)
- 2016: Seoul Samsung Thunders (player development)
- 2019–2020: De La Salle (consultant)

Jermaine Byrd is an American former professional basketball coach.

== Career ==
Byrd started his coaching career at Tulsa 66ers as an assistant. He later worked as an assistant coach for Sioux Falls Skyforce, and Los Angeles D-Fenders. He also worked as player development for Seoul Samsung Thunder.

In 2019, he was tapped as an active consultant for Gian Nazario for De La Salle Green Archers. He was replaced in the next season by Derrick Pumaren.
