= 2024 PBA D-League Aspirants' Cup =

Philippine minor-league basketball season

2024 PBA D-League Aspirant's Cup
- The 11th PBA Aspirant's Cup
- Duration: March 14, 2024 – May 9, 2024
- Number of teams: 6
- TV partner(s): RPTV, PBA Rush, Pilipinas Live

Finals
- Champions: EcoOil–La Salle Green Archers
- Runners-up: CEU Scorpions

Awards
- Best Player: Michael Philips

PBA D-League Aspirant's Cup chronology
- < 2023

The 2024 PBA D-League Aspirants' Cup is the 11th edition the Aspirants' Cup of the PBA D-League, the Philippine Basketball Association's (PBA) official minor league.

== Format ==
- All participating teams play in a single round-robin elimination, with each team playing five games throughout the duration of the tournament.
- Teams are ranked by win-loss records with the top two teams advancing directly to the semifinals, with the remaining four teams taking part in the quarterfinals.
- All playoff series are best-of-three.

== Teams ==
Six teams will compete in this tournament, including five college-backed teams and a team owned by Keanzel Basketball.

Team	Company / College	Head coach
CCI–Yengskivel Crusaders	Cornerstone College (SJDM, Bulacan); Yengskivel Sportswear	Arwin Villamor Adina
CEU Scorpions	Centro Escolar University	Jeff Perlas
EcoOil–La Salle Green Archers	EcoOil Ltd. De La Salle University	Topex Robinson
Keanzel Believers	Keanzel Basketball	Mark Herrera
Marinerong Pilipino Skippers–San Beda	Marinerong Pilipino Group; San Beda University	Yuri Escueta
GoTorakku–St. Clare Saints	Torakku Motor Assembly; St. Clare College of Caloocan	Jinino Manansala

== Venues ==
Filoil EcoOil Centre	Ynares Center
Capacity: 6,000	Capacity: 7,400

== Elimination round ==
The elimination round began on March 14, 2024, at the Filoil EcoOil Centre in San Juan.

=== Standings ===
Pos	Team	Pld	W	L	PF	PA	PR	PCT	GB	Qualification
1	EcoOil–La Salle Green Archers	5	5	0	506	340	1.488	1.000	—	Advance to semifinals
2	CEU Scorpions	5	4	1	430	381	1.129	.800	1	Advance to semifinals
3	Marinerong Pilipino–San Beda	5	3	2	461	348	1.325	.600	2	Twice-to-beat in quarterfinals
4	GoTorakku–St. Clare Saints	5	2	3	433	429	1.009	.400	3	Twice-to-beat in quarterfinals
5	CCI–Yengskivel Crusaders	5	1	4	394	523	0.753	.200	4	Twice-to-win in quarterfinals
6	Keanzel Believers	5	0	5	388	591	0.657	.000	5	Twice-to-win in quarterfinals

Updated to match(es) played on April 18, 2024. Source: Standings
Rules for classification: 1) Winning percentage; 2a) If two teams are tied, head-to-head record; 2b) If three or more teams are tied, head-to-head point quotient; 3) Overall point quotient; 4) Coin toss

=== Results table ===
Legend
Won in regulation	Lost in regulation
Won in overtime	Lost in overtime
(*) Number of asterisks denotes number of overtime periods

2024 PBA D-League Aspirants' Cup results table
Team	Game				
Team	1	2	3	4	5
CCI–Yengskivel (CCI)	ECO; 68–110	KEA; 88–73	MAR; 76–126	GOT; 84–118	CEU; 78–96
CEU	ECO; 63–80	KEA; 126–91	GOT; 73–69	MAR; 72–63	CCI; 96–78
EcoOil–La Salle (ECO)	CCI; 110–68	GOT; 90–63	CEU; 80–63	KEA; 144–75	MAR; 82–71
GoTorakku–St. Clare (GOT)	MAR; 59–92	ECO; 63–90	CEU; 69–73	CCI; 118–84	KEA; 124–90
Keanzel (KEA)	MAR; 59–109	CCI; 73-88	CEU; 91–126	ECO; 75–144	GOT; 90–124
Marinerong Pilipino–San Beda (MAR)	GOT; 92–59	KEA; 109–59	CCI; 126–76	CEU; 63–72	ECO; 71–82
Source: Standings | Updated as of: March 14, 2024

== Playoffs ==
Quarterfinals (Higher seeds twice-to-beat)
4	GoTorakku–St. Clare	114
5	CCI–Yengskivel	106
3	Marinerong Pilipino–San Beda	127
6	Keanzel	67

Semifinals (Best-of-three playoff)
1	EcoOil–La Salle Green Archers	2
4	GoTorakku–St. Clare	0
2	CEU Scorpions	2
3	Marinerong Pilipino–San Beda	1

Finals (Best-of-three playoff)
1	EcoOil–La Salle Green Archers	2
2	CEU Scorpions	0

=== Quarterfinals ===
The third and fourth-seeded teams have the twice-to-beat advantage against the sixth and fifth-seeded teams, respectively.

==== (3) Marinerong Pilipino vs. (6) Keanzel ====
RPTV, PBA Rush

April 22
4:30 p.m.

Recap

Marinerong Pilipino-San Beda	127–67	Keanzel Believers
Scoring by quarter: 25–7, 18−26, 40–19, 44–15
Marinerong Pilipino wins series in one game

Filoil EcoOil Centre, San Juan

==== (4) Go Torakku vs. (5) CCI ====
RPTV, PBA Rush

April 22
7:30 p.m.

Recap

Go Torakku-St. Clare	114–106	CCI-Yengskivel
Scoring by quarter: 27−16, 27−23, 33−44, 27−23
Go Torakku wins series in one game

Filoil EcoOil Centre, San Juan

=== Semifinals ===
==== (1) Ecooil - DLSU vs. (4) Go Torakku - St. Clare ====
RPTV, PBA Rush

April 25
4:30 p.m.

Recap

EcoOil - DLSU	85–65	Go Torakku - St. Clare
Scoring by quarter: 11−13, 25−21, 34−13, 15−18

Ynares Sports Arena, Pasig

RPTV, PBA Rush

April 30
7:30 pm

Recap

EcoOil - DLSU	105–70	Go Torakku - St. Clare
Scoring by quarter: 20−18, 27−11, 25−20, 33−21
EcoOil-DLSU wins series, 2–0

Ynares Sports Arena, Pasig

==== (2) CEU Scorpions vs. (3) Marinerong Pilipino - San Beda ====
RPTV, PBA Rush

April 25
7:30 p.m.

Recap

CEU Scorpions	75–71	Marinerong Pilipino - San Beda
Scoring by quarter: 17−20, 22−13, 15−13, 21−25

Ynares Sports Arena, Pasig

RPTV, PBA Rush

April 30
4:30 p.m.

Recap

Marinerong Pilipino - San Beda	84–76	CEU Scorpions
Scoring by quarter: 27−19, 31−19, 8−15, 18−23

Ynares Sports Arena, Pasig

RPTV, PBA Rush

May 2
7:30 p.m.

Recap

CEU Scorpions	78–56	Marinerong Pilipino - San Beda
Scoring by quarter: 19−11, 24−11, 13−20, 22−14
CEU wins series, 2−1

Ynares Sports Arena, Pasig

=== Finals ===
RPTV, PBA Rush

May 6
7:30 p.m.

Recap

EcoOil - DLSU	98–72	CEU Scorpions
Scoring by quarter: 23−9, 31−19, 25−17, 19−27

Filoil EcoOil Centre, San Juan

RPTV, PBA Rush

May 9
7:30 p.m.

Recap

CEU Scorpions	66–96	EcoOil - DLSU
Scoring by quarter: 7−18, 23−29, 17−19, 19−30
EcoOil-DLSU wins series, 2–0

Ynares Sports Arena, Pasig
