= Topex Robinson =

Filipino basketball player and coach

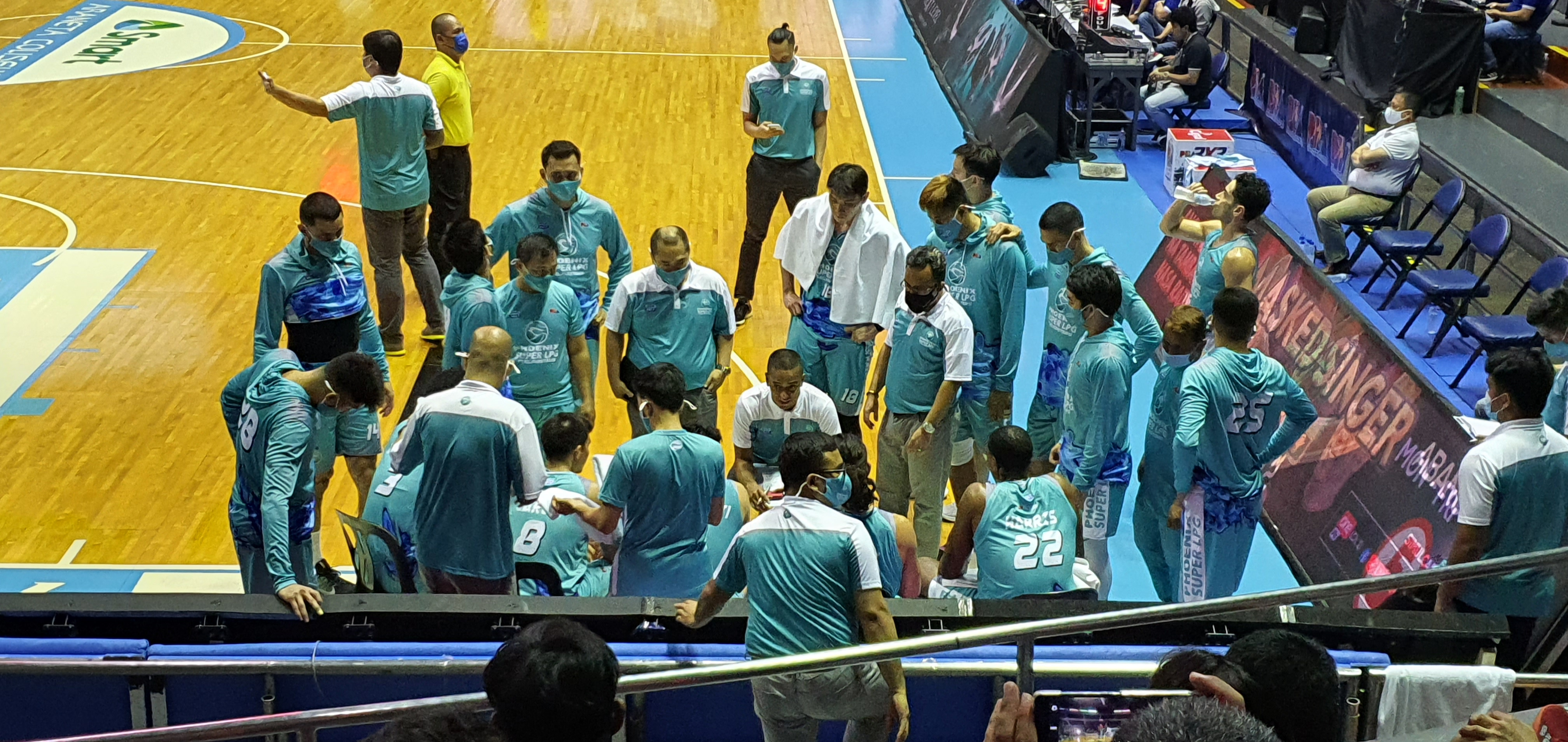
- Robinson (center) and the Phoenix Super LPG Fuel Masters during a timeout.

De La Salle Green Archers
- Title: Head coach
- League: UAAP

Personal information
- Born: December 25, 1976 (age 49) Olongapo, Philippines
- Listed height: 5 ft 7 in (1.70 m)
- Listed weight: 155 lb (70 kg)

Career information
- College: San Sebastian
- PBA draft: 2001: 3rd round, 44th overall pick
- Drafted by: Tanduay Rhum Masters
- Playing career: 1999–2011
- Position: Point guard
- Number: 5, 11
- Coaching career: 2011–present

Career history

Playing
- 1999–2000: San Juan Knights
- 2003–2008: Red Bull Barako
- 2008–2009: Purefoods Tender Juicy Giants
- 2010–2011: Alaska Aces

Coaching
- 2011–2012, 2013–2014: San Sebastian
- 2011–2017: Alaska Aces (assistant)
- 2015–2019: Lyceum
- 2017–2020: Phoenix Super LPG Fuel Masters (assistant)
- 2020–2022: Phoenix Super LPG Fuel Masters
- 2023–present: De La Salle

Career highlights
- As player: 2× PBA champion (2005–06 Fiesta, 2010 Fiesta); PBA All-Defensive Team (2006); 2× NCAA champion (1996, 1997); As head coach: 2× UAAP champion (2023, 2025); 2× PCCL champion (2011, 2017); 3× PBA D-League champion (2018, 2023, 2024); 2× UAAP Men's Basketball Coach of the Year (2023, 2025); As assistant coach: PBA champion (2013 Commissioner's)

Michael Christopher "Topex" Robinson (born December 25, 1976) is a Filipino professional basketball coach and former player who is the head coach for the De La Salle Green Archers of the University Athletic Association of the Philippines (UAAP). He previously coached the Phoenix Super LPG Fuel Masters of the Philippine Basketball Association (PBA). He was drafted 44th overall by the Tanduay Rhum Masters.

== Playing career ==
Robinson was a member of the San Sebastian Stags team that won several titles in 1990s.

He also first played for the San Juan Knights in the MBA.

Robinson played point guard. He played for Montaña in the PBL and was then signed as a free agent by Yeng Guiao in 2003 to play for Red Bull Thunder as a backup point guard.

After the 2008 PBA Fiesta Conference ended, the Red Bull waived him. He was immediately signed by the Purefoods Tender Juicy Giants for the 2008–09 PBA season. After one season with Purefoods, he worked as a caregiver in the US for eight months to support his family. During the 2010 PBA Fiesta Conference, he was signed by Alaska. Alaska won the championship that season.

== Coaching career ==
Robinson started as an assistant under Tim Cone in Alaska Aces, his last played team in the middle of 2010–11 season.

Robinson was named coach of the RnW Pacific Pipes team in the PBA D-League during the 2011 PBA D-League Foundation Cup, leading the team to the quarterfinals. In June 2011, Robinson was named coach of the San Sebastian Stags. After the Stags lost to the San Beda Red Lions in the Finals of NCAA Season 87, Robinson led the Stags to the 2011 Philippine Collegiate Championship, beating the Ateneo Blue Eagles in two games.

In 2011, he returned to the PBA as he joined the Alaska Aces as an assistant coach to Joel Banal, Luigi Trillo, and Alex Compton from 2011 to 2017. Robinson also served as the head coach of the Lyceum Pirates from 2015 to 2019. He led the Pirates to winning the title in the 2017 PCCL National Collegiate Championship, beating the San Beda Red Lions. In 2018, Robinson led Zark's-Lyceum to the championship in the 2018 PBA D-League Aspirants' Cup. He became the head coach of the Phoenix Super LPG Fuel Masters in 2020.

Robinson left Phoenix in January 2023. In the same month, he was named as the new head coach of the De La Salle Green Archers. In his first year, he led the Green Archers to their first UAAP Finals appearance since 2017, and ended a seven-year title drought. Robinson joined a group of La Salle mentors who reached the UAAP finals in their first year as head coach and won the championship. This includes coaches Franz Pumaren, Juno Sauler, and Aldin Ayo. In June 2024, he was recognized by the Collegiate Press Corps as the UAAP Men's Basketball Coach of the Year for the 2023–24 season. In August 2024, he led the Green Archers to sweep the 2024 World University Basketball Series in Tokyo, Japan.

In May 2025, Robinson and the Green Archers won against the Ateneo Blue Eagles to claim the championship of the 2025 AsiaBasket College Campus Tour. In UAAP Season 88, Robinson and the Green Archers entered the Final Four as the fourth seed. They swept the top-seeded NU Bulldogs to return to the finals to face the then defending champions, the UP Fighting Maroons, for the third consecutive year. The De La Salle Green Archers dethroned the UP Fighting Maroons during the best-of-three series, having lost Game 2 but won Games 1 and 3 to claim their 11th UAAP championship and their second title under Robinson. The Green Archers became the second fourth seed team to win the title after the NU Bulldogs from UAAP Season 77 in 2014.

In February 2026, Robinson joined the Benilde Blazers as a team consultant. In June 2026, he was recognized by the Collegiate Press Corps as the UAAP Men's Basketball Coach of the Year for the 2025–26 season. In August 2026, Robinson and the Green Archers swept the University Top League (UTL) tournament in Japan to win the title.

== Personal life ==
Robinson studied in San Sebastian College – Recoletos, and played for the San Sebastian Stags in the NCAA. Aside from being the head coach of the De La Salle Green Archers in the UAAP, Robinson is taking up Sports Management at De La Salle University. He is currently the only UAAP student-coach to lead a team from a school where he is also studying.

== PBA career statistics ==
Legend
GP	Games played	MPG	Minutes per game
FG%	Field-goal percentage	3P%	3-point field-goal percentage	FT%	Free-throw percentage
RPG	Rebounds per game	APG	Assists per game	SPG	Steals per game
BPG	Blocks per game	PPG	Points per game	**Bold**	Career high

=== Season-by-season averages ===
Year	Team	GP	MPG	FG%	3P%	FT%	RPG	APG	SPG	BPG	PPG
2003	Red Bull	16	15.4	**.575**	**.571**	.474	2.2	**3.4**	1.0	.0	3.7
2004–05	Red Bull	**70**	17.0	.353	.179	.488	3.3	2.8	1.0	.1	3.6
2005–06	Red Bull	65	**19.4**	.439	.192	.481	**3.9**	2.8	.8	**.2**	5.1
2006–07	Red Bull	51	16.4	.417	.100	.448	3.1	2.3	1.0	.0	4.4
2007–08	Red Bull	45	17.7	.407	.184	.545	**3.9**	**3.4**	**1.3**	.1	**5.9**
2008–09	Purefoods	30	**19.4**	.435	.250	**.591**	3.8	2.3	1.2	.0	3.2
2009–10	Alaska	8	5.0	.500	—	—	.9	.6	.0	.0	.8
2010–11	Alaska	2	8.0	—	—	—	2.0	1.5	.0	.0	.0
Career		287	17.3	.413	.191	.502	3.4	2.7	1.0	.1	4.3

== Coaching record ==
=== Collegiate record ===
Season	Team	Elimination round					Playoffs				
Season	Team	Finish	GP	W	L	PCT	GP	W	L	PCT	Results
2011	SSC-R	2nd	18	16	2	.888	4	1	3	.667	Runner-up
2012	SSC-R	2nd	10	7	3	.700	—	—	—	—	(Resigned)
2013	SSC-R	3rd	18	11	7	.611	2	1	1	.500	Semifinals
2014	SSC-R	8th	18	5	13	.277	—	—	—	—	Eliminated
2015	LPU	9th	18	4	14	.222	—	—	—	—	Eliminated
2016	LPU	9th	18	6	12	.333	—	—	—	—	Eliminated
2017	LPU	1st	18	18	0	1.000	2	0	2	.000	Runner-up
2018	LPU	2nd	18	15	3	.833	3	1	2	.333	Runner-up
2019	LPU	2nd	18	13	5	.722	1	0	1	.000	Semifinals
2023	DLSU	2nd	14	11	3	.786	4	3	1	.750	Champion
2024	DLSU	1st	14	12	2	.857	4	2	2	.500	Runner-up
2025	DLSU	4th	14	8	6	.571	5	4	1	.800	Champion
SSC-R totals			46	34	12	.739	6	2	4	.333	0 championships
LPU totals			90	56	34	.622	6	1	5	.200	0 championships
DLSU totals			42	31	11	.738	13	9	4	.692	2 championships
Totals			196	126	70	.641	20	8	12	.400	2 championships

=== Professional career ===
Season	Conference	Team	Elimination round					Playoffs				
Season	Conference	Team	Finish	GP	W	L	PCT	GP	W	L	PCT	Results
2020	Philippine Cup	Phoenix Super LPG	2nd	11	8	3	.727	6	3	3	.500	Semifinals
2021	Philippine Cup	Phoenix Super LPG	9th	11	4	7	.364	—	—	—	—	Eliminated
2021	Governors' Cup	Phoenix Super LPG	8th	11	5	6	.445	1	0	1	.000	Quarterfinals
2022–23	Philippine Cup	Phoenix Super LPG	11th	11	3	8	.273	—	—	—	—	Eliminated
2022–23	Commissioner's Cup	Phoenix Super LPG	7th	12	6	6	.500	1	0	1	.000	Quarterfinals
Totals				56	26	30	.464	8	3	5	.375	0 championships

Preceded by Turo Valenzona	San Sebastian Stags men's basketball head coach 2011–2012	Succeeded by Allan Trinidad
Preceded by Allan Trinidad	San Sebastian Stags men's basketball head coach 2013–2014	Succeeded by Rodney Santos
Preceded by Bonnie Tan	Lyceum Pirates men's basketball head coach 2015–2019	Succeeded by Gilbert Malabanan
Preceded by Derrick Pumaren	De La Salle Green Archers head coach 2023–present	Succeeded by Incumbent
