= Juno Sauler =

Filipino basketball player and coach

Magnolia Chicken Timplados Hotshots
- Position: Assistant coach
- League: PBA

Personal information
- Born: March 5, 1973 (age 53) Baguio, Philippines

Career information
- College: De La Salle
- Coaching career: 1998–present

Career history

Coaching
- 1998–1999: De La Salle (men) (assistant)
- 1999–2001: De La Salle (women)
- 1999-2001: DLSZ
- 2002–2015: Barangay Ginebra San Miguel (assistant)
- 2013–2015: De La Salle (men)
- 2015–present: Magnolia Chicken Timplados Hotshots (assistant)
- 2024–present: UST (men) (assistant)

Career highlights
- As head coach: UAAP champion (2013); 3x UAAP Women's Champion (1999, 2000, 2001); As assistant coach: 5x PBA champion (2004 Fiesta, 2004–05 Philippine, 2006–07 Philippine, 2008 Fiesta, 2018 Governors'); 5x UAAP champion (1998, 1999, 2000, 2001, 2007)

Marco Januz "Juno" Sauler (born March 5, 1973) is a basketball coach and former basketball player from the Philippines. He was a former head coach of the De La Salle University Green Archers, a collegiate team in the UAAP. Sauler is currently part of coaching staff of the Magnolia Chicken Timplados Hotshots in the Philippine Basketball Association (PBA) and the University of Santo Tomas Men's Basketball Team in the University Athletic Association of the Philippines (UAAP).

== Early years and playing career ==
Sauler was born in Baguio on March 5, 1973. His father, Jun, had also played collegiate varsity basketball and is credited with teaching his son the game. Sauler studied in De La Salle Santiago Zobel School from the Preparatory level to High School. In his junior and senior years he played power forward / center in varsity basketball for the Golden Bengals (now known as the Junior Archers) from 1988 to 1990 in the UAAP. In his senior year, he was recruited by a rival UAAP university for its collegiate team but he chose to enroll and try out for De La Salle University instead.

Sauler attended De La Salle University, where he majored in economics. While in college, he played power forward for the De La Salle Green Archers from 1992 to 1994 and led as team captain from 1993 to 1994. On his last year as team captain, the Green Archers reached the finals but lost the championship to UST. Aside from Sauler's varsity presence, his academic performance was also recognized with his thesis paper vying for Best Thesis in Economics. He was conferred a Bachelor of Arts degree majoring in economics and was also granted a Loyalty award for being a La Salle student from Preparatory school to college, and a Gawad Magaaral award, specifically the Gawad Br. John Lynam FSC, for sportsmanship and leadership. In 1997, Sauler played for Wilkins Distillery in the Philippine Basketball League through two conferences. In his second conference, he was simultaneously assistant coach of the team.

== Coaching career ==
Sauler became assistant to Jong Uichico for the De La Salle Green Archers in May 1998 but 6 weeks before the start of the UAAP season, Franz Pumaren took over as head coach. Sauler was in Pumaren's coaching staff for a year.

In October 1998, he moved on to coach the De La Salle collegiate women's basketball team, the Lady Archers. He directed them to win three straight UAAP championships (1999–2001) and four straight NCRAA titles. Concurrently, Sauler was head coach of the De La Salle – Zobel Junior Archers which would finish in the top 3 for those seasons.

From 2001 to 2002 he was a volunteer coach for the Philippine National Men's Basketball Team in the Asian games under Uichico.

In 2002, he moved on to the professional league where he was hired as assistant to Allan Caidic of the Barangay Ginebra Kings.

Sauler rejoined the De La Salle Green Archers as assistant to Gee Abanilla in October 2011.

He took over as head coach on June 8, 2013, just three weeks before the start of the UAAP season 76. In his rookie season at the helm of the Green Archers, Sauler led the team to sweep the second round eliminations and make it to the finals. He subsequently led the team to win the championship against the University of Santo Tomas Growling Tigers in a final deciding game in overtime.

After UAAP season 76, Sauler and deputy coaches Caidic and Jun Limpot observed the training camp of the San Antonio Spurs and practices of the University of Texas Longhorns. This was followed by a 5-day comprehensive development program in the New South Wales Institute of Sport in Australia.

After the UAAP the Green Archers won the National Championship in Philippine Collegiate Basketball after defeating SWU in the finals of the 2013–2014 season of the Philippine Collegiate Champions League (PCCL).

More recently, the Green Archers won the 2014 FilOil Flying V Hanes Premier Cup preseason tournament by defeating NCAA champions, the San Beda Red Lions.

At various times since starting coaching, Sauler attended seminars and observerships under Mike D'Antoni (Phoenix Suns 2005), Mike Dunleavy, Sr. (Los Angeles Clippers 2005), Bill Guthridge (University of North Carolina 1999), Phil Jackson (Los Angeles Lakers 2005), Bob Knight (Indiana University 1999), Mike Krzyzewski (Duke University 1999), Lute Olson (University of Arizona 2005), Paul Westphal (Pepperdine University 2005), Ben Howland (UCLA 2005), Larry Brown (South Methodist University 2014), Johnny Dawkins (Stanford University 2014), and Steve Kerr (Golden State Warriors 2014).

On November 24, 2015, La Salle confirmed the resignation of Sauler as head coach of the Green Archers.

Shortly after his resignation, Sauler was immediately hired by Coach Jason Webb to join the Purefoods franchise, which was carrying the name Star Hotshots at the time. Webb, who was Sauler's former teammate at De La Salle Zobel and De La Salle University, brought him onto the coaching staff as an assistant. This move also marked the end of Sauler's 13-year tenure with Barangay Ginebra. During his time with the Hotshots, the team made multiple finals appearances and eventually won the 2018 PBA Governors' Cup championship with Romeo Travis as their import.

In 2024, Sauler was hired by the UST Growling Tigers as part of the coaching staff, the team he defeated in 2013 UAAP finals as the head coach of De La Salle. Despite his new role with UST, he continues to serve as an assistant coach for the Magnolia Chicken Timplados Hotshots, a team under the Purefoods franchise in the PBA.

In his first season, he led UST to a 3rd place finish after the team had finished last in the previous season. The UST Tigers returned to the Final Four but were eliminated by the UP Fighting Maroons in the semifinals.

== Awards ==
After the UAAP and NCAA seasons, Sauler together with Coach Boyet Fernandez of the San Beda Red Lions, shared the Coach of the Year award of the 2013 Collegiate Basketball Awards hosted by the UAAP-NCAA Press Corps and SMART telecommunications.

Sauler also won the Best Coach award for PCCL 2013.

In 2023, Sauler was inducted into the Sports Hall of Fame by the De La Salle Alumni Association, recognizing his contributions to La Salle Basketball, particularly his role in leading the Green Archers to the 2013 UAAP Championship and his earlier success with the Lady Archers from 1999-2001.

== Advocacy Against Zone Defense ==
In early 2023, Sauler began conducting research on the Philippines' FIBA ranking compared to other countries. His findings revealed that many top-ranked basketball nations prohibit zone defense at the youth level, allowing young players to develop stronger individual defensive skills, decision making and overall basketball IQ.

As a result, Sauler has actively campaigned against the use of zone defense in youth basketball across the Philippines. He has been traveling across the country, conducting basketball clinics and engaging with youth leagues and training camps, advocating for a ban on zone defense for players aged 15 and below.

His advocacy has influenced several club organizers and leagues to adopt this rule. Prominent youth basketball leagues such as Batang PBA, Batang Pilipino Basketball League, NBL-Pilipinas, MILCU and others have implemented restrictions on zone defense, impacting over 1,000 youth teams and 15,000 young players nationwide.

== Personal life ==
Sauler met his wife, Agnes Apostol, while they were classmates in De La Salle Zobel. They have two children, Lauren Marie and Santiago Mari. His wife Agnes, was formerly an assistant lecturer at the DLSU School of Economics but is currently working as a VP of HSBC. His daughter Lauren is with the De La Salle Zobel Softball team, and his son Santi plays basketball in the De La Salle Zobel Grade School division. Sauler is second of four children. His sister Rhia is a doctor at the De La Salle University Medical Center. His sister Rica is a professor with the School of Economics of De La Salle University. His brother Nino also played power forward for De La Salle – Zobel. Sauler's sister-in-law, Aissa, is a teacher in De La Salle Zobel and her husband Adonis Santa Maria is a former professional basketball player who also suited up for the DLSU Green Archers.

== Coaching record ==
Season	Team	Elimination round						Playoffs			
Season	Team	Finish	GP	W	L	PCT	PG	W	L	PCT	Results
2013	DLSU	2nd	14	10	4	.714	5	4	1	.800	Champion
2014	DLSU	3rd	14	10	4	.714	3	1	2	.333	Semifinals
2015	DLSU	5th	14	6	8	.429	—	—	—	—	Eliminated
Totals			42	26	16	.619	8	5	3	0.625	1 championship

Preceded by Gee Abanilla	De La Salle Green Archers head coach 2013-2015	Succeeded by Aldin Ayo
