= Mike Cortez =

Filipino-American basketball player

Blackwater Bossing
- Title: Assistant coach
- League: PBA

Personal information
- Born: November 10, 1980 (age 46) San Jose, California
- Listed height: 6 ft 0 in (1.83 m)
- Listed weight: 170 lb (77 kg)

Career information
- High school: Carson (Carson, California)
- College: De La Salle
- PBA draft: 2003: 1st round1st overall
- Drafted by: Alaska Aces
- Playing career: 2003–2019
- Position: Point guard
- Coaching career: 2023–present

Career history

Playing
- 2003–2008: Alaska Aces
- 2008–2010: San Miguel Beermen
- 2010: Air21 Express
- 2010–2012: Barangay Ginebra San Miguel
- 2012–2013: Air21 Express
- 2013–2015: Meralco Bolts
- 2015–2016: Blackwater Elite
- 2016–2017: GlobalPort Batang Pier
- 2017–2019: Blackwater Elite

Coaching
- 2023–present: Blackwater Bossing (assistant)

Career highlights
- 3× PBA champion (2003 Invitational, 2007 Fiesta, 2009 Fiesta); PBA All-Star (2003); PBA Mythical Second Team (2006); PBA Comeback Player of the Year (2009); 2× UAAP champion (2000, 2001); 2× UAAP Mythical Five (2000, 2002); UAAP Rookie of the Year (2000)

Mike Salonga Cortez (born November 10, 1980) is a Filipino-American professional basketball coach and former player. He is an assistant coach for the Blackwater Bossing of the Philippine Basketball Association (PBA). He played for eight franchises during his career in the PBA. Cortez gained prominence in the amateur ranks for the De La Salle Green Archers in the UAAP and the ICTSI Archers in the Philippine Basketball League. In 2003, he was the first overall pick of Alaska Aces in the 2003 PBA draft.

== Amateur career ==
In 2000, Cortez debuted for the De La Salle Green Archers. With him, veterans Ren-Ren Ritualo and later Mark Cardona, the Green Archers won two of the three UAAP titles from 2000 to 2002.

He also played in the PBL for the ICTSI Archers, a team composed mostly of DLSU players alongside then University of the East star James Yap. With the two playing together, ICTSI almost won a PBL title in 2001 only to be defeated by the veteran-laiden Shark Energy Drink.

By 2002, Cortez's performance had quickly led to him being considered the top prospect for the PBA. He was included in the Mythical 5 in the 2000 and 2002 UAAP season.

== Professional career ==
After the 2002 UAAP season, Cortez applied for the 2003 PBA draft and was quickly drafted by the Alaska Aces as the top overall pick. By then, he was considered as the successor to Johnny Abarrientos as the team's next big star at the point guard position, and signed a ₱8,700,000 three-year contract.

However, he struggled in his first season in the pros with inconsistent performances due to Tim Cone's triangle offense system, and the emphasis on Ali Peek, Don Allado and fellow rookie Brandon Cablay. Despite this development, he was a member of the 2003 PBA Invitational Champions defeating the Coca-Cola Tigers.

He lost race to fellow point guard Jimmy Alapag of the Talk 'N Text Phone Pals in the Rookie of the Year.

By the 2004–05 PBA season, he was starting to increase his role as Alaska added young players such as Sonny Thoss, and veterans Reynel Hugnatan and Jeffrey Cariaso.

The next season, he played probably his best season in the league, playing in a consistent level while forming a two-man tandem with Willie Miller as Alaska almost went to the PBA Philippine Cup finals, but they lost to the eventual champion Purefoods Chunkee Giants 4–3.

He missed most of the 2006–07 PBA Philippine Cup following a season-ending ACL injury in the third game of the conference.

On March 19, 2008, he was traded along with big man Ken Bono to the Magnolia Beverage Masters (now renamed back to San Miguel Beermen) for LA Tenorio and Larry Fonacier.

In 2009, after recuperating from his second ACL injury in his pro career, he received the Comeback Player of the Year award for his role in the 2009 PBA Fiesta Conference title of the San Miguel Beermen. His second conference title and third overall in the PBA.

On June 11, 2010, he played his last game with Air21 as he was traded after that game for Ginebra's Billy Mamaril.

Although he helped Alaska and San Miguel win a single title each, the Cool Cat did not win a crown with the Barangay Ginebra. But he recorded his first triple-double in his pro career with the Kings on Game 3 of the 2012 PBA Commissioner's Cup Quarterfinals against B-Meg Llamados when he registered 17 points, 11 rebounds and 10 assists earning Best Player of the Game honors.

On November 7, 2012, he was traded back to the Express, in exchange for rookie Yousef Taha, where he reunited with coach Franz Pumaren, Ren-Ren Ritualo and Cholo Villanueva — all members of the 2001 La Salle four-peat squad.

On September 6, 2013, he was traded to Meralco Bolts in exchange for the rights of Asi Taulava, who at that time was coming off a successful campaign in the ASEAN Basketball League with San Miguel Beermen.

On August 7, 2015, Cortez and James Sena were traded by Meralco to the Blackwater Elite in exchange for Larry Rodriguez, who was also traded by the Bolts to the Talk 'N Text Tropang Texters via the Elite in exchange for Jimmy Alapag.

On September 1, 2016, he was traded by the Blackwater Elite to the GlobalPort Batang Pier in exchange for Ronald Pascual.

== Personal life ==
Cortez is married to Joy Refuerzo. They have two sons: Jacob and Mikey. Both sons committed to playing for DLSU, beginning with Season 88.

== PBA career statistics ==
Legend
GP	Games played	MPG	Minutes per game
FG%	Field-goal percentage	3P%	3-point field-goal percentage	FT%	Free-throw percentage
RPG	Rebounds per game	APG	Assists per game	SPG	Steals per game
BPG	Blocks per game	PPG	Points per game	**Bold**	Career high

=== Season-by-season averages ===
Year	Team	GP	MPG	FG%	3P%	FT%	RPG	APG	SPG	BPG	PPG
2003	Alaska	56	**34.9**	.401	.262	.782	**4.4**	4.2	**1.5**	**.4**	11.4
2004–05	Alaska	**57**	34.4	.391	.382	.774	4.1	**5.5**	1.1	.3	12.3
2005–06	Alaska	46	33.4	.408	.313	.708	4.0	4.8	.9	.2	**12.8**
2006–07	Alaska	23	27.7	.437	.270	.716	3.4	3.6	1.4	.1	11.3
2007–08	Alaska	55	29.6	.416	.349	.765	3.8	4.4	1.0	**.4**	10.8
2007–08	Magnolia	55	29.6	.416	.349	.765	3.8	4.4	1.0	**.4**	10.8
2008–09	San Miguel	19	20.4	.392	.328	.679	2.6	2.3	.5	.3	8.9
2009–10	San Miguel	49	23.4	.429	.325	.782	3.4	3.4	.9	.2	9.4
2009–10	Air21	49	23.4	.429	.325	.782	3.4	3.4	.9	.2	9.4
2009–10	Barangay Ginebra	49	23.4	.429	.325	.782	3.4	3.4	.9	.2	9.4
2010–11	Barangay Ginebra	**57**	23.4	.396	.340	.735	3.1	2.9	.6	.3	6.8
2011–12	Barangay Ginebra	45	27.9	.395	**.414**	.740	3.9	3.8	.9	.2	9.4
2012–13	Barangay Ginebra	42	28.1	.414	.338	.644	**4.4**	4.3	1.3	.2	9.3
2012–13	Air21	42	28.1	.414	.338	.644	**4.4**	4.3	1.3	.2	9.3
2013–14	Meralco	15	31.6	**.481**	.404	.793	3.3	5.3	.7	**.4**	11.5
2014–15	Meralco	41	26.3	.374	.316	.594	2.8	2.9	.8	.1	6.6
2015–16	Blackwater	27	31.9	.410	.304	.851	3.7	4.3	1.0	.2	9.9
2016–17	GlobalPort	36	23.3	.444	.388	.778	3.2	2.1	.9	.1	6.9
2017–18	Blackwater	23	14.0	.380	.350	.692	2.0	1.7	.6	.1	3.3
2019	Blackwater	30	16.4	.426	.237	**1.000**	1.9	1.7	.9	.0	3.1
Career		621	27.5	.408	.338	.747	3.5	3.7	1.0	.2	9.3
