= Batang Pilipino Basketball League =

Inter-municipality basketball league

Batang Pilipino Basketball League (BPBL)
- Sport: Basketball
- Founded: October 2020
- First season: January 27, 2023
- President: Jun Ebdane
- Commissioner: Ron Camara
- No. of teams: 14 (boys); 11 (girls)
- Country: Philippines
- Continent: FIBA Asia (Asia)
- Most recent champions: Davao (Boys); Cebu (Girls)
- Broadcaster: ABS-CBN Sports

The Batang Pilipinas Basketball League (lit. 'Filipino Youth Basketball League') is a national inter-city and inter-municipality grassroots basketball league established during the time of the COVID-19 pandemic.

Founded by Jun Ebdane and Commissioner Ron Camara, the league holds its inaugural National Finals from January 27–29, 2023 in San Juan City which was participated in by 14 teams in boys Under-18 and 11 teams in girls Under-18 division, which were qualified from the regional elimination phases late last 2022.

The league provides an equal and inclusive opportunity to showcase the Filipino young talents, specifically the underprivileged and out-of-school-youth in the field of basketball, to be discovered and scouted by different colleges and universities from the UAAP and NCAA and to help the local government units in their grassroots development in sports.
