= Kevin Quiambao =

Filipino basketball player (born 2001)

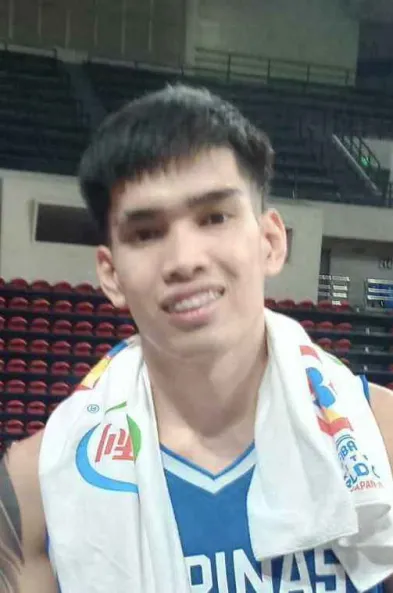
- Quiambao in 2024

No. 28 – Goyang Sono Skygunners
- Position: Small forward / power forward
- League: KBL

Personal information
- Born: April 22, 2001 (age 25) Muntinlupa, Philippines
- Listed height: 6 ft 4 in (1.94 m)
- Listed weight: 205 lb (93 kg)

Career information
- High school: Lyceum–Cavite (General Trias, Cavite); NSNU (Manila)
- College: De La Salle (2022–2024)
- Playing career: 2024–present

Career history
- 2024–present: Goyang Sono Skygunners

Career highlights
- KBL Rookie of the Year (2026); 2x PBA D-League champion (2022 Aspirants' Cup, 2023 Aspirants' Cup); PBA D-League Most Valuable Player (2023 Aspirants' Cup); PBA D-League Finals MVP (2023 Aspirants' Cup); Filoil EcoOil Preseason Cup Most Valuable Player (2024); Filoil EcoOil Preseason Cup Mythical Five (2024); UAAP champion (2023); UAAP Most Valuable Player (2023, 2024); UAAP Finals MVP (2023); UAAP Mythical Team (2023, 2024); UAAP Rookie of the Year (2022)

Karl Kevin Argana Quiambao (born April 22, 2001), also known by his initials KQ, is a Filipino professional basketball player for the Goyang Sono Skygunners of the Korean Basketball League (KBL).

Quiambao won back-to-back UAAP high school championships with the NU Bullpups before playing for the De La Salle Green Archers in the league's collegiate level. He was named Rookie of the Year in season 85 (2022). He then led the Green Archers to the UAAP championship in season 86 (2023) in which he also won both the Most Valuable Player (MVP) and Finals MVP awards. He is also the first to have logged multiple triple-doubles in a season during the Final Four era (since 1993). In Season 87 (2024), he won his second consecutive MVP award but failed to defend their championship in the finals rematch with the UP Fighting Maroons.

Quiambao has been playing for the Philippine national team since 2022, notably in that year's FIBA Asia Cup.

== Early life ==
Quiambao's father and grandfather taught him how to play basketball, and he also looked up to the likes of Ryan Buenafe and Marc Pingris. He played in leagues in his barangay of Bayanan growing up.

== High school career ==
=== Lyceum Junior Pirates ===
Quiambao was recruited to play for the Lyceum Junior Pirates after he was noticed at a barangay league. He didn't make the roster for two years, instead spending time with Lyceum's Team B. During this time, coach LA Mumar encouraged him to pattern his game after Nikola Jokić.

=== NU Bullpups ===
In 2016, Quiambao tried out for the Bullpups, where coach Goldwin Monteverde took him in. He often had workouts with NU Lady Bulldogs star player Jack Animam.

==== Season 81: First championship ====
Before the start of Season 81, NU successfully captured the ASEAN School Games title, in which they swept the competition in four games.

In a Season 81 win over the UST Tiger Cubs, Quiambao led the team with 13 points, eight rebounds, two assists and two blocks. In the second round of eliminations, he had 10 points and seven rebounds in a win over the Ateneo Blue Eaglets. He then had a double-double of 10 points and 11 rebounds in a 51-point win over the UPIS Junior Maroons. They went on to sweep the second round. They met Ateneo again in the Finals, where in Game 1, he had 14 points and 13 rebounds to lead NU to the win. With Carl Tamayo, they combined for 29 points and 25 rebounds and limited Ateneo's star center Kai Sotto to just 16 points. In Game 2, he had an all-around performance of eight points, six boards, five assists, and two blocks, and NU won the juniors' championship for the first time since 2016.

==== Season 82: Second championship ====
Before the start of Season 82, NU successfully defended its ASEAN School Games title, in which they defeated Indonesia for the gold medal. During the season, they swept the elimination rounds, earning an outright spot in the Finals. The Bullpups then swept the FEU Baby Tamaraws in the Finals, with Quiambao contributing in Game 2 with eight points and seven rebounds. He was the only Bullpup on the Season 82 Mythical Team. He also finished third in the NBTC 24 rankings, with only San Beda forward Rhayyan Amsali and Tamayo ahead of him. His averages that season were 12.3 points, 9.8 rebounds (including 4.0 offensive rebounds per game), and 1.4 blocks per game in just under 23 minutes a game.

== College career ==
On August 1, 2020, he committed to play for the De La Salle Green Archers. He was also recruited by UP, which would have reunited him with his high school teammates as most of them had committed there. Since there was no UAAP basketball during the COVID-19 pandemic, Quiambao stayed in shape by playing in Filipino basketball leagues in Dubai. Prior to Season 85, he got to play with DLSU in the PBA D-League and in the Filoil EcoOil Preseason Cup.

=== Season 85: Rookie of the Year ===
Quiambao had an ugly start to his UAAP career, as he only had five points on 2-of-13 shooting and three steals in a loss to the UP Fighting Maroons. He bounced back with 11 points, three rebounds, three assists, and two steals against the UST Growling Tigers. In a loss to the UE Red Warriors, he had 15 points and six rebounds. The Archers bounced back from the loss with a win over the FEU Tamaraws, in which he had 16 points, eight rebounds, and four assists. Against NU, he had 15 points and six rebounds, but missed a corner triple in the clutch, leading to their first loss to NU in seven years. He then had 20 points and nine rebounds in an overtime loss to the Adamson Falcons. They then lost a rematch with FEU in which he had 12 points, eight rebounds, and four assists. After spending time with Gilas, he returned to help La Salle break UP's seven-game winning streak with 18 points (13 in the fourth quarter alone) and nine rebounds. For that performance, he was voted Player of the Week. He was unable to play in a crucial game against Adamson as he had tested positive for COVID-19, and La Salle did not make it to the Final Four. He was awarded Rookie of the Year with averages of 11.2 points, 6.5 rebounds, 3.2 assists, and 1.1 steals. That season, he also competed in the 3x3 basketball event, and helped La Salle win the championship for that event.

=== Season 86: First championship ===
On October 28, 2023, in a win over NU, Quiambao recorded his first triple-double with 17 points, 11 rebounds and 14 assists while also contributing four steals. He became the first UAAP player since CJ Cansino in 2018 to record a triple-double, the first non-guard to do so, and the first Green Archer to ever record one. In a win over UE, he became the first player in the UAAP men's basketball Final Four era to have logged multiple triple-doubles in one season, as he recorded 17 points, 19 rebounds, and 12 assists while also providing four steals and two blocks. In Game 3 of the Finals, he put up 24 points, nine rebounds, four assists, and two blocks to lead DLSU to its first championship since 2016. He won Finals MVP with averages of 14.7 points, 9.3 rebounds, 2.3 assists, and two blocks, becoming the first player since Arwind Santos in 2005 to win both the Season and Finals MVP in the same season.

=== Season 87: Last season with DLSU ===
On April 3, 2024, Quiambao confirmed that he would play one more season for DLSU. During the preseason, he was awarded as the MVP of the Filoil EcoOil Preseason Cup despite losing to UP in the cup finals. He also helped DLSU win the 2024 World University Basketball Series.

DLSU began Season 87 with a clutch win over NU thanks to Quiambao's 22 points, eight rebounds, seven assists, and a game-winning triple with 9.8 seconds remaining. He then had 21 points, five rebounds, four assists, two steals, and one block in a win over Adamson. DLSU lost its first game of the season against UE, in which he missed two free throws that could have tied the game with 15.8 seconds left. They bounced back from the loss by winning the rest of the first elimination round and went on to claim the lead in the standings.

In a win over UST, Quiambao scored a personal best 29 points along with nine rebounds and three assists. He then reset his college career-high to 33 points in a rout of Ateneo. At the end of the elimination rounds, he was the league's leading scorer with 16.6 points, while also being second in free throw percentage (77.8%), and fourth in assists (4.1). Once again, he was awarded as the league's MVP, with averages of 16.6 points, 8.6 rebounds, 4.1 assists, and one block in 14 games. This made him the fifth Archer to win consecutive MVP titles after Jun Limpot (1987–88), Mark Telan (1996–97), Don Allado (1998–99), and Ben Mbala (2016–17). He also made the Mythical Team, and received special citations worth ₱190,000 from the league's sponsors.

Quiambao led DLSU to its second straight Finals appearance for a rematch against UP. In the first half of Game 1, he scored 18 points. However, in the second half, he only scored one point as UP denied him the ball and held him to zero field goals made the rest of the way to take Game 1. He bounced back the next game, coming off the bench and made three clutch three-pointers to tie the series. In Game 3, he was limited to 13 points on 4-of-11 shooting and failed to record an assist and UP won the championship. Despite losing the title, Quiambao was seen as one of the greatest players in UAAP history. After the season, he decided to forgo his remaining two years of eligibility and turned professional.

== Professional career ==
=== Goyang Sono Skygunners (2024–present) ===
On December 16, 2024, Quiambao confirmed that he had signed with the Goyang Sono Skygunners in the Korean Basketball League (KBL). He debuted for Goyang on January 13, 2025, in a game against the Seoul SK Knights. However he sustained an injury in that game.

Initially thought to miss a month, Quiambao returned two weeks after the injury in a loss to the Anyang Red Boosters. He experienced his first win with the team against Wonju DB Promy in which he scored a career-high 36 points with 12 rebounds. He then had a career-high 18 assists in an upset win over Busan KCC Egis, also the most in the KBL in five years. That season, Goyang finished eighth in the standings as he averaged 16.9 points, 6.3 rebounds, 3.9 assists, and 1.3 steals per game. In June 2025, Quiambao signed a three-year extension with Goyang.

With Goyang's full support, Quiambao went to Sacramento, California in July 2025 to join a training camp for a chance to play in the 2025 NBA Summer League. However, he was named in neither the Sacramento Kings' roster nor any other teams'. Instead, he played scrimmages which include participation in the Drew League.

Quiambao then returned to Goyang for his first full season. In the 2025–26 season, he led Goyang to its first-ever KBL playoffs appearance with a 28–26 record. For his performance, he won the Rookie of the Year award with averages of 15.2 points, 6.5 rebounds, 1.1 steals, 4.0 assists and close to a block per game. He also became the third Filipino to win the award after RJ Abarrientos and JD Cagulangan. They went on to make the finals that season, but lost 1–4 to Busan.

== National team career ==
=== Junior national team ===
Quiambao made his 3x3 debut during the 2019 FIBA 3x3 U-18 Asia Cup. They were eliminated in the quarterfinals by China.

=== Senior national team ===
In 2021, Quiambao was invited to the Philippine national team training pool, but he declined the invitation to fulfill requirements needed for his Grade 12 studies. He accepted the invite the following year as Gilas was preparing for the third window of qualifying for the 2023 FIBA World Cup. He played two games in the third window and four games in the 2022 FIBA Asia Cup, averaging a team-high 4.2 assists, with 6.0 points and 3.5 rebounds. He was also on the roster for the fifth and sixth windows.

While playing for Strong Group Athletics at the 2024 Dubai International Basketball Championship, Quiambao received an offer to play for the United Arab Emirates national team as a naturalized player. Later that year, he played in the first and second windows of the 2025 FIBA Asia Cup qualifiers. Against Hong Kong, he finished with 15 points on 7-of-12 shooting to go along with three rebounds, two assists and a steal in 17 minutes of action, while in a win over Chinese Taipei, he had eight points, five rebounds, and four assists. He also played in the FIBA OQT, his first major tournament as a member of the senior national team.

In 2025, Quiambao played in the 2025 FIBA Asia Cup. Against Saudi Arabia, he contributed 17 points to bring Gilas back into the quarterfinals for the first time since 2017. In a crucial win over Jordan during the second round of qualifying for the 2027 FIBA World Cup, he scored 14 points with five rebounds and made the game-winning three-pointer.

== Player profile ==
In high school, he became known as a player who did not need the ball to be effective, and a solid defender with his size. His biggest strengths are his three-point shooting, ball-handling, defense, and conditioning. He has patterned his playing style after Nikola Jokić's as a playmaking big man, and has said that his goal is to become capable of playing not just the five position, but the four and three positions as well. He previously weighed in at 103 kilograms, but slimmed down to 93 kg to play better at the three. Philippines head coach Tim Cone has lauded his versatility, as he could play more positions for the national team. In 2026, he tried Quiambao at shooting guard in a game against New Zealand, in which he scored 23 points and was able to display his size, ball-handling, perimeter shooting, and ability to get to the rim.

== Career statistics ==
=== KBL ===
Year	Team	GP	MPG	FG%	3P%	FT%	RPG	APG	SPG	BPG	PPG
2024–25	Goyang	23	31.3	.407	.319	.813	6.3	3.9	1.3	0.3	16.9
Career		23	31.3	.407	.319	.813	6.3	3.9	1.3	0.3	16.9

== Endorsements ==
Quiambao is one of several Filipino ambassadors for Adidas. In 2024, he became the first Filipino athlete to receive a player edition sneaker, the adizero Select 3.0 “KQ63”, which was created in collaboration with toy designer and street artist Quiccs Marquez. It was also worn by Jalen Green in a game during Filipino Heritage Night. He is also the main endorser for ChickyFam, a roasted chicken business.

== Personal life ==
Quiambao is in a relationship with Faye Aguila. They have a son who was born in 2024.

Quiambao is an avid gamer, specifically on Mobile Legends: Bang Bang, which he picked up in 2020. He once expressed interest to join DLSU's esports team.
