= 2023 PBA D-League Aspirants' Cup =

2023 PBA D-League Aspirant's Cup
- The 10th PBA Aspirant's Cup
- Duration: April 27 – June 26, 2023
- Number of teams: 7
- TV partner(s): One Sports; PBA Rush

Finals
- Champions: EcoOil - DLSU Green Archers
- Runners-up: Marinerong Pilipino - San Beda

PBA D-League Aspirant's Cup chronology
- < 2022 2024 >

The 2023 PBA D-League Aspirants' Cup is the tenth Aspirants' Cup of the PBA D-League, the official minor league basketball organization owned by the Philippine Basketball Association (PBA).

== Tournament format ==
Each team will play the other teams once in the elimination round. The top two teams advance to the semifinals outright. The next two teams have the twice-to-beat advantage against the next two teams in the quarterfinals. One team is eliminated. Both the semifinals and finals are best-of-three series.

== Teams ==
There are seven teams in the tournament, with six college-backed teams, and a team by the Philippine Sports Performance (PSP). An eighth team, from Saint Clare College of Caloocan, withdrew days prior to the opening due to budget issues.

Team	Company	Head coach	
AMA Online Education Kings	AMA University	Mark Herrera	
CEU Scorpions	Centro Escolar University	Jeff Perlas	
EcoOil - DLSU Green Archers	Ecology Energy Corporation	Topex Robinson	Gian Nazario (acting)
Marinerong Pilipino - San Beda	Marinerong Pilipino Group	Yuri Escueta	
Wang's Basketball @ 27 Strikers - Letran	PRC Courier & Maintenance Services	Rensy Bajar	
University of Perpetual Help System - Dalta	University of Perpetual Help System DALTA	Myk Saguiguit	
PSP Gymers	Philippine Sports Performance Fitness Centre	John Paolo Lao	

== Venues ==
The FilOil EcoOil Centre in San Juan and the Ynares Sports Arena in Pasig are the host venues of the tournament.

== Elimination round ==
=== Team standings ===
Pos	Team	W	L	PCT	GB	Qualification
1	Marinerong Pilipino - San Beda	5	1	.833 (Note: Head-to-head record: Marinerong Pilipino 1–0 EcoOil)	—	Advance to the semifinals
2	EcoOil - DLSU Green Archers	5	1	.833	—	Advance to the semifinals
3	University of Perpetual Help System - Dalta	3	3	.500 (Note: Head-to-head quotient: Perpetual 1.165, Wangs 0.948, CEU 0.921)	2	Twice-to-beat in the quarterfinals
4	Wangs Basketball @27 Strikers - Letran	3	3	.500	2	Twice-to-beat in the quarterfinals
5	CEU Scorpions	3	3	.500	2	Twice-to-win in the quarterfinals
6	PSP Gymers	2	4	.333	3	Twice-to-win in the quarterfinals
7	AMA Online Education Kings	0	6	.000	5	

Rules for classification: 1) winning percentage; 2) if two teams are tied, head-to-head record; if three or more teams are tied, head-to-head goal average (quotient); 3) overall quotient 4) coin toss

=== Results ===
Teams	AMA	CEU	ECO	MAR	WAN	UPH	PSP
AMA Online Education Kings	—	68–107	43–126	70–119	57–71	57–101	70–108
CEU Scorpions		—	62–84	72–81	92–85*	72–93	109–107**
EcoOil - DLSU Green Archers			—	82–79	102–79	80–73	108–67
Marinerong Pilipino - San Beda				—	90–87	66–64	92–94
Wangs Basketball @27 Strikers - Letran					—	62–61	100–92
University of Perpetual Help System - Dalta						—	93–82
PSP Gymers							—

Source: PBA.ph
Legend: Blue = left column team win; Red = top row team win.
Matches with lighter background shading were decided after overtime.

== Bracket ==
Quarterfinals (Higher seeds twice-to-beat)
4	Wangs-Letran	94 (OT)
5	CEU	87
3	Perpetual	97
6	PSP	90

Semifinals (Best-of-three playoff)
1	Marinerong Pilipino-San Beda	2
4	Wangs-Letran	1
2	EcoOil-DLSU	2
3	Perpetual	0

Finals (Best-of-three playoff)
1	Marinerong Pilipino-San Beda	0
2	EcoOil-DLSU	2

*Overtime

== Quarterfinals ==
The third- and fourth-seeded teams have the twice-to-beat advantage against the sixth- and fifth-seeded teams, respectively.

=== (3) Perpetual vs. (6) PSP ===
June 6
2:00 p.m.

University of Perpetual Help System - Dalta	97–90	PSP Gymers
Perpetual wins series in one game

Paco Arena, Paco, Manila

=== (4) Wangs-Letran vs. (5) CEU ===
June 6
4:00 p.m.

Wangs Basketball @27 Strikers - Letran	94–87 (OT)	CEU Scorpions
Wangs-Letran wins series in one game

Paco Arena, Paco, Manila

== Semifinals ==
The first-seeded team will play the winner between the fourth- and fifth-seeded team, while the second-seeded team will play the winner between the third- and sixth-seeded team. Both series are best-of-three playoffs.

=== (1) Marinerong Pilipino-San Beda vs. (4) Wangs-Letran ===
June 8
2:00 p.m.

Marinerong Pilipino - San Beda	87–93 (OT)	Wangs Basketball @27 Strikers - Letran

Ynares Sports Arena, Pasig

June 13
4:00 p.m.

Marinerong Pilipino - San Beda	74–51	Wangs Basketball @27 Strikers - Letran

Filoil EcoOil Centre, San Juan

June 15
3:00 p.m.

Marinerong Pilipino - San Beda	79–65	Wangs Basketball @27 Strikers - Letran
Marinerong Pilipino-San Beda wins series 2–1

Ynares Sports Arena, Pasig

=== (2) EcoOil-DLSU vs. (3) Perpetual ===
June 8
4:00 p.m.

EcoOil - DLSU Green Archers	107–78	University of Perpetual Help System - Dalta

Ynares Sports Arena, Pasig

June 13
2:00 p.m.

EcoOil - DLSU Green Archers	108–91	University of Perpetual Help System - Dalta
EcoOil-DLSU wins series 2–0

Filoil EcoOil Centre, San Juan

== Finals ==
The finals is a best-of-three playoff.

June 22
3:00 p.m.

Marinerong Pilipino - San Beda	82–108	EcoOil - DLSU Green Archers

Ynares Sports Arena, Pasig

June 26
3:00 p.m.

Marinerong Pilipino - San Beda	74–89	EcoOil - DLSU Green Archers
EcoOil-DLSU wins series 2–0

Ynares Sports Arena, Pasig

- Finals MVP: Kevin Quiambao (EcoOil-DLSU)
