= 2025 AsiaBasket College Campus Tour =

Eighth tournament of AsiaBasket; first in 2025

- Official promotional poster for the finals

Tournament details
- Country: Philippines
- Cities: Las Piñas; Manila; Quezon City
- Venue(s): Ateneo de Manila University; De La Salle–College of Saint Benilde; University of Perpetual Help System DALTA; University of the East
- Dates: March 16 – May 11, 2025
- Teams: 14

Final positions
- Champions: De La Salle Green Archers
- Runners-up: Ateneo Blue Eagles
- Third place: NU Bulldogs
- Fourth place: San Beda Red Lions

The 2025 AsiaBasket College Campus Tour was the eighth tournament under the AsiaBasket. The tournament began on March 16 and ended on May 11. It featured fourteen colleges and universities from four different associations. It is also the first tournament since the 2022 Summer Championship to be held across multiple venues, with games taking place across multiple campuses.

The NU Bulldogs entered this tournament as defending champions. The tournament was won by the De La Salle Green Archers, after they defeated rivals Ateneo Blue Eagles in the finals.

== Teams ==
This tournament featured the most teams in FilBasket/AsiaBasket history with fourteen teams, all from the Philippines at the collegiate level. It was the second AsiaBasket tournament to feature an all-Filipino cast, after the 2023 Las Piñas Championship.

The teams themselves came from four different associations: six from both the University Athletic Association of the Philippines (UAAP) and National Collegiate Athletic Association (NCAA), and one from both the National Athletic Association of Schools, Colleges and Universities (NAASCU) and Universities and Colleges Athletic League (UCAL).

Team	College	Association	Last appearance	Best result
Adamson Soaring Falcons	Adamson University	UAAP	International 2024	Runner-up (1x)
Ateneo Blue Eagles	Ateneo de Manila University	UAAP	Las Piñas 2023	Champion (1x)
Benilde Blazers	De La Salle–College of Saint Benilde	NCAA	International 2024	Champion (1x)
De La Salle Green Archers	De La Salle University	UAAP	Debut	
EAC Generals	Emilio Aguinaldo College	NCAA	Debut	
FEU Tamaraws	Far Eastern University	UAAP	International 2024	Fourth place (1x)
Lyceum Pirates	Lyceum of the Philippines University	NCAA	Debut	
Mapúa Cardinals	Mapúa University	NCAA	International 2024	Quarterfinalist (1x)
NU Bulldogs	National University	UAAP	International 2024	Champion (1x)
PCU–Dasmariñas Dolphins	Philippine Christian University Dasmariñas	UCAL	Dasmariñas 2023	Group stage (1x)
Perpetual Altas	University of Perpetual Help System DALTA	NCAA	Las Piñas 2023	Group stage (1x)
San Beda Red Lions	San Beda University	NCAA	International 2024	Runner-up (1x)
St. Clare Saints	St. Clare College of Caloocan	NAASCU	Debut	
UE Red Warriors	University of the East	UAAP	Debut	

== Group stage ==
This tournament used the same two-group format used since the 2022 International Championship, with the fourteen teams divided into two groups of seven. From there, each team played one game against all other teams from the same group, with each team playing six games. The top four teams advanced to the single-elimination knockout stage, as has been the case since the 2023 Las Piñas Championship.

=== Group A ===
==== Standings ====
Pos	Team	Pld	W	L	PF	PA	PD	PCT	Qualification
1	De La Salle Green Archers	6	6	0	555	464	+91	1.000	Quarterfinals
2	Ateneo Blue Eagles	6	5	1	537	436	+101	.833	Quarterfinals
3	St. Clare Saints	6	3	3	436	508	−72	.500 (Note: St. Clare wins tiebreaker over San Beda by head-to-head victory (81–77).)	Quarterfinals
4	San Beda Red Lions	6	3	3	460	444	+16	.500	Quarterfinals
5	UE Red Warriors	6	2	4	421	452	−31	.333 (Note: UE wins tiebreaker over EAC by head-to-head victory (73–70).)	
6	EAC Generals	6	2	4	468	478	−10	.333	
7	PCU–Dasmariñas Dolphins	6	0	6	451	546	−95	.000	

Source: Standings via Genius Sports (FilBasket)
Rules for classification: 1) Win percentage; 2) Head-to-head record; 3) Head-to-head point differential; 4) Head-to-head points scored; 5) Overall point differential; 6) Overall points scored.

==== Results ====
Team	Game					
Team	1	2	3	4	5	6
Ateneo Blue Eagles (ADMU)	SCC; 107–48	SBU; 87–68	DLSU; 92–95	EAC; 89–73	PCU–D; 93–89	UE; 69–63
De La Salle Green Archers (DLSU)	UE; 85–67	ADMU; 95–92	SBU; 79–77	SCC; 104–75	EAC; 100–82	PCU–D; 92–71
EAC Generals (EAC)	SCC; 80–69	SBU; 60–68	ADMU; 73–89	UE; 70–73	PCU–D; 103–79	DLSU; 82–100
PCU–Dasmariñas Dolphins (PCU–D)	UE; 69–84	ADMU; 89–93	EAC; 79–103	SBU; 72–94	SCC; 71–80	DLSU; 71–92
San Beda Red Lions (SBU)	UE; 76–65	ADMU; 68–87	EAC; 68–60	DLSU; 77–79	PCU–D; 94–72	SCC; 77–81
St. Clare Saints (SCC)	EAC; 69–80	ADMU; 48–107	UE; 83–69	DLSU; 75–104	PCU–D; 80–71	SBU; 81–77
UE Red Warriors (UE)	DLSU; 67–85	SBU; 65–76	PCU–D; 84–69	EAC; 73–70	SCC; 69–83	ADMU; 63–69

Source: Schedule
Legend: Blue = win; Red = loss

=== Group B ===
==== Standings ====
Pos	Team	Pld	W	L	PF	PA	PD	PCT	Qualification
1	Benilde Blazers	6	6	0	462	392	+70	1.000	Quarterfinals
2	NU Bulldogs	6	5	1	469	430	+39	.833	Quarterfinals
3	Adamson Soaring Falcons	6	3	3	431	419	+12	.500	Quarterfinals
4	Perpetual Altas	6	2	4	346	371	−25	.333 (Note: Perpetual (2–0), Mapúa (1–1), and FEU (0–2) are ranked based on head-to-head record.)	Quarterfinals
5	Mapúa Cardinals	6	2	4	409	429	−20	.333	
6	FEU Tamaraws	6	2	4	422	435	−13	.333	
7	Lyceum Pirates	6	1	5	408	471	−63	.167	

Source: Standings via Genius Sports (FilBasket)
Rules for classification: 1) Win percentage; 2) Head-to-head record; 3) Head-to-head point differential; 4) Head-to-head points scored; 5) Overall point differential; 6) Overall points scored.

==== Results ====
Team	Game					
Team	1	2	3	4	5	6
Adamson Soaring Falcons (AdU)	FEU; 53–55	UPHSD; 55–51	CSB; 61–79	NU; 91–94	MU; 93–74	LPU; 78–66
Benilde Blazers (CSB)	MU; 66–64	AdU; 79–61	LPU; 78–74	NU; 85–62	UPHSD; 68–54	FEU; 86–77
FEU Tamaraws (FEU)	MU; 60–69	AdU; 55–53	LPU; 94–62	NU; 69–86	UPHSD; 67–79	CSB; 77–86
Lyceum Pirates (LPU)	UPHSD; 67–60	FEU; 62–94	MU; 72–79	CSB; 74–78	AdU; 66–78	NU; 67–82
Mapúa Cardinals (MU)	FEU; 69–60	UPHSD; 53–54	CSB; 64–66	LPU; 79–72	NU; 70–84	AdU; 74–93
NU Bulldogs (NU)	UPHSD; 61–48	FEU; 86–69	MU; 84–70	AdU; 94–91	CSB; 62–85	LPU; 82–67
Perpetual Altas (UPHSD)	LPU; 60–67	NU; 48–61	AdU; 51–55	MU; 54–53	FEU; 79–67	CSB; 54–68

Source: Schedule
Legend: Blue = win; Red = loss

== Knockout stage ==
In the quarterfinals, the first-seeded teams will be matched with the fourth-seeded teams from the opposing group. The same process will follow for the second- and third-seeded teams. Being single-elimination, the winner of each game advances to the next round. In the semifinals, the losing teams will compete in a third place game.

Quarterfinals
A1	De La Salle	20
B4	Perpetual	0
B2	NU	83
A3	St. Clare	53
B1	Benilde	76
A4	San Beda	83
A2	Ateneo	79
B3	Adamson	68

Semifinals
A1	De La Salle	102
B2	NU	100
A4	San Beda	88
A2	Ateneo	89

Finals
A1	De La Salle	89
A2	Ateneo	77
Third place
B2	NU	77
A4	San Beda	75

=== Quarterfinals ===
May 4
8:00 am

Boxscore

De La Salle Green Archers	20–0	Perpetual Altas
Game forfeited in favor of De La Salle

De La Salle–College of Saint Benilde

May 4
10:00 am

Boxscore

St. Clare Saints	53–83	NU Bulldogs
Scoring by quarter: 9–19, 20–20, 12–21, 12–23
Pts: Gazzingan, Mandiria 11; Rebs: Mandiria 10; Asts: Lim 5		Pts: Padrones 17; Rebs: John 12; Asts: Garcia 7

De La Salle–College of Saint Benilde

May 4
12:00 pm

Boxscore

Ateneo Blue Eagles	79–68	Adamson Soaring Falcons
Scoring by quarter: 22–17, 19–24, 26–10, 12–17
Pts: Adili 20; Rebs: Ladi 14; Asts: Espinosa, Tuano 5		Pts: Montebon 14; Rebs: Ojarikre 11; Asts: Montebon 7

De La Salle–College of Saint Benilde

May 4
2:00 pm

Boxscore

San Beda Red Lions	83–76	Benilde Blazers
Scoring by quarter: 23–20, 18–16, 21–16, 21–24
Pts: Miller 33; Rebs: Etulle 6 Asts: three players 4		Pts: Ancheta 18; Rebs: Liwag 6 Asts: Torres 3

De La Salle–College of Saint Benilde

=== Semifinals ===
May 10
2:00 pm

Boxscore

NU Bulldogs	100–102	De La Salle Green Archers
Scoring by quarter: 21–24, 36–29, 18–27, 25–22
Pts: Manansala 21; Rebs: John 9 Asts: Enriquez 10		Pts: Baclaan 20; Rebs: Phillips 14; Asts: Baclaan 4

Ateneo de Manila University

May 10
4:00 pm

Boxscore

San Beda Red Lions	88–89	Ateneo Blue Eagles
Scoring by quarter: 24–21, 29–22, 17–20, 18–26
Pts: Miller 20; Rebs: Miller 10; Asts: Sajonia 6		Pts: Tuano 22; Rebs: Ladi 12; Asts: Bahay 9

Ateneo de Manila University

=== Battle for third ===
May 11
2:00 pm

Boxscore

San Beda Red Lions	75–77	NU Bulldogs
Scoring by quarter: 14–22, 26–10, 15–23, 20–22
Pts: Miller 20; Rebs: Puno 6 Asts: Puno, Reyes 3		Pts: Santiago 15; Rebs: John 15; Asts: Jumamoy 5

Ateneo de Manila University

=== Finals ===
May 11
4:00 pm

Boxscore

De La Salle Green Archers	89–77	Ateneo Blue Eagles
Scoring by quarter: 29–16, 13–19, 21–18, 26–24
Pts: Cortez 21; Rebs: Phillips 14; Asts: Cortez 6		Pts: Ladi 22; Rebs: Adili 13; Asts: Bahay Espinosa 6

Ateneo de Manila University

== Awards ==
Awards	Winner (s)	Team
Most Valuable Player	Mike Phillips	(Philippines) De La Salle Green Archers
Finals MVP	Jacob Cortez	(Philippines) De La Salle Green Archers
All-AsiaBasket First Team	Ajanti Miller	(Philippines) San Beda Red Lions
All-AsiaBasket First Team	Kymani Ladi	(Philippines) Ateneo Blue Eagles
All-AsiaBasket First Team	Mike Phillips	(Philippines) De La Salle Green Archers
All-AsiaBasket First Team	Omar John	(Senegal) NU Bulldogs
All-AsiaBasket First Team	Ian Espinosa	(Philippines) Ateneo Blue Eagles
Coach(es) of the Tournament	Topex Robinson and Oliver Bunyi	(Philippines) De La Salle Green Archers
