= De La Salle Green Archers basketball =

Men's basketball team of De La Salle University

De La Salle Green Archers
| 2026 De La Salle Green Archers basketball team |
- University: De La Salle University
- Founded: Early 20th century
- History: De La Salle Green and White (until 1938); De La Salle Green Archers (since 1939)
- Head coach: Topex Robinson (4th season)
- Location: Taft Avenue, Manila
- Nickname: Green Archers
- Colors: Green and white

UAAP Championships (11)
- 1989; 1990; 1998; 1999; 2000; 2001; 2007; 2013; 2016; 2023; 2025

NCAA Championships (5)
- 1939; 1947; 1956; 1971; 1974

The De La Salle Green Archers are the collegiate men's basketball team of De La Salle University, which play in the University Athletic Association of the Philippines (UAAP), a collegiate athletic league composed of major universities in the Philippines.

== History ==
La Salle was a pre-war founding member of the National Collegiate Athletic Association (NCAA) in 1924. La Salle participated in the NCAA for 57 years from 1924 to 1981. The La Salle basketball players were first referred to as the Green Archers during the basketball games of NCAA Season 16 (1939–40), where La Salle made its way to the finals and won against their eventual archrival Ateneo in an upset for its first basketball championship title in the seniors' division of the NCAA. Accordingly, the news reporters who were covering La Salle games at that time coined the team the "Green Archers" due in part to the La Salle players' accurate shooting skills.

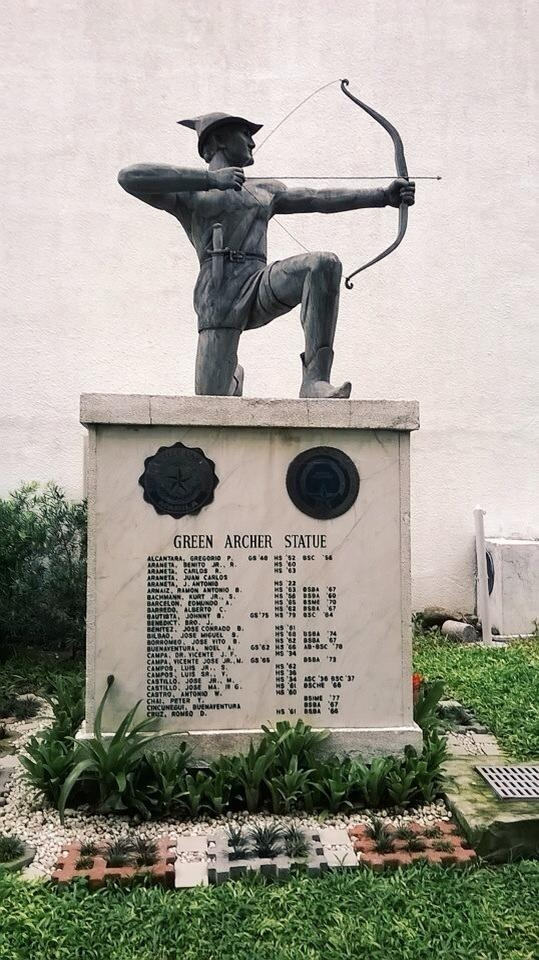
The Green Archer statue

La Salle won five NCAA basketball titles – 1939, 1947, 1956, 1971, and 1974. The Green Archers won the coveted National Seniors Open Championship, a league participated by top commercial and college teams, twice in 1939 and 1949. In September 1980, La Salle announced its decision to leave the NCAA in a press conference effective after the then ongoing 1980–81 NCAA Season due to a violent basketball game against their archrivals at the time, the Letran Knights.

After bolting out of the NCAA in 1981, the team participated in various tournaments. The Green Archers won the 1983 Philippine Amateur Basketball League (PABL) Championship and 1983 National Open title. La Salle has won three inter-collegiate titles. The school won the 1988 Philippine Intercollegiate Championship. This was later reformatted to become the Collegiate Champions League (CCL), which then became the current Philippine Collegiate Championship League (PCCL) with La Salle winning the championship in 2008 and 2013.

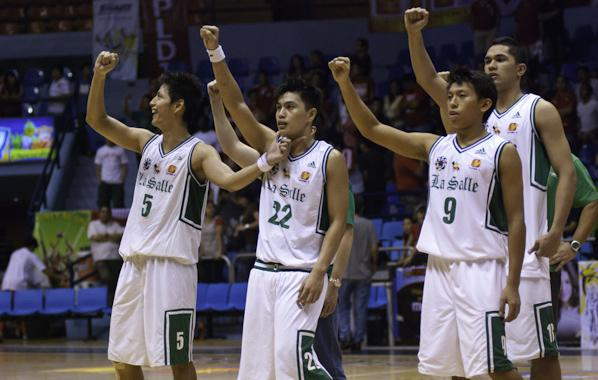
The De La Salle Green Archers in 2010

In 1986, La Salle was accepted as a member of the University Athletic Association of the Philippines (UAAP). Since joining the UAAP in 1986, the Green Archers have won 11 UAAP basketball titles – 1989, 1990, 1998, 1999, 2000, 2001, 2007, 2013, 2016, 2023, and 2025. La Salle's basketball program is known for having the most finals appearance with 19, as well as the longest consecutive finals appearance with nine from 1994 to 2002. The program is also known for having won four straight UAAP championship titles from 1998 to 2001. The Green Archers are also known for sharing a rivalry with other competitive teams in the UAAP, especially with the Ateneo Blue Eagles, UST Growling Tigers, and FEU Tamaraws. In UAAP Season 88, the Green Archers became the second fourth seed team to win the title after the NU Bulldogs from UAAP Season 77 in 2014. La Salle dethroned the UP Fighting Maroons during the best-of-three series, having lost Game 2 but won Games 1 and 3.

The Green Archers won the UAAP Season 85 3x3 basketball tournament in 2023. They retained the title the following year in UAAP Season 86. They won their third consecutive title in UAAP Season 87. In UAAP Season 88, the Green Archers swept the tournament en route to their fourth consecutive championship.

Prior to the start of the UAAP season, the Green Archers participate in multiple preseason tournaments. In the Filoil EcoOil Preseason Cup they have won four titles, the latest being the 2016 championship. The Green Archers participated in the Buddha Light International Association (BLIA) Cup, where they last won the championship in 2017. The Green Archers have also participated in the PBA D-League Aspirants' Cup as EcoOil–La Salle, where they have won three straight championships. In the Pinoyliga Collegiate Cup, the Green Archers won their first title in 2024. In August 2024, the Green Archers swept the 2024 World University Basketball Series in Tokyo, Japan. La Salle has also participated in the AsiaBasket tournaments. In May 2025, the Green Archers won against the Ateneo Blue Eagles to claim the championship of the 2025 AsiaBasket College Campus Tour. In August 2026, the Green Archers swept the University Top League (UTL) tournament in Japan to win the title.

The team is currently managed by Raffy Villavicencio, Terry Capistrano, Andres Reyes Jr., and Mans Carpio, with International Container Terminal Services (ICTSI) chairman and president Enrique K. Razon as the main patron. Topex Robinson serves as the head coach since 2023, with Caloy Garcia as the lead assistant coach. Other assistant coaches include Marlon Celis, Oliver Bunyi, Mon Jose, Gian Nazario, and JB Sison. Marco Villanueva, Miguel Aytona, and Gelo Vito serve as strength and conditioning coaches with Timothy Ting as head nutrionist.

== Current roster ==
De La Salle Green Archers roster
Players
Coaches

| Pos. | No. | Nat. | Name | Height | Year | High School |
|---|---|---|---|---|---|---|
| G | 0 | (Philippines) | Guillian Quines | 6'0" (1.83m) | 2nd | La Salle Green Hills |
| G/F | 1 | (Philippines) | Jan Clement Macalalag | 6'2" (1.88m) | 5th | La Salle Green Hills |
| G/F | 2 | (Philippines) | Vhoris Marasigan | 6'2" (1.88m) | 3rd | San Beda University |
| G | 3 | (Philippines) | Kyle Sardon | 5'10" (1.78m) | 1st | St. Roberts International College |
| C | 6 | (South Sudan) | Moses Mandiria Kulang | 6'10" (2.08m) | 1st | St. Clare College |
| G/F | 7 | (Australia) | Earl Jared Abadam (C) | 6'4" (1.93m) | 5th | Westfield Sports High School |
| F | 8 | (Philippines) | Ram Sharma | 6'6" (1.98m) | 1st | La Salle Green Hills |
| PF/C | 9 | (Philippines) | Luis Pablo | 6'8" (2.03m) | 4th | La Salle Green Hills |
| G | 11 | (United States) | Jacob Cortez | 5'11" (1.8m) | 5th | La Salle Green Hills |
| C | 12 | (Nigeria) | Henry Agunanne | 6'11" (2.11m) | 5th | Centro Escolar University |
| G | 13 | (United States) | Joaquin Tovera | 5'10" (1.78m) | 1st | Chino Hills High School |
| G/F | 19 | (Philippines) | Andrei Dungo | 6'3" (1.91m) | 3rd | University of Santo Tomas |
| PF/C | 21 | (Australia) | Mason Amos | 6'7" (2.01m) | 5th | Brisbane State High School |
| G | 30 | (United States) | Michael Cortez | 5'11" (1.8m) | 1st | St. Anthony High School |
| F | 34 | (Philippines) | Lebron Daep | 6'7" (2.01m) | 2nd | University of Perpetual Help System DALTA |
| C | 77 | (Philippines) | Seven Gagate | 6'8" (2.03m) | 3rd | La Salle Green Hills |
| G | 99 | (Philippines) | Gian Gomez | 5'6" (1.68m) | 2nd | La Salle Green Hills |

Head coach

- (Philippines) Topex Robinson

Assistant coach(es)

- (Philippines) Caloy Garcia (Lead Assistant Coach)
- (Philippines) Oliver Bunyi
- (Philippines) John Pelotos
- (Philippines) Mon Jose
- (Philippines) Gian Nazario
- (Philippines) Marlon Celis
- (Philippines) JB Sison
- (Philippines) Patrick Melencio
- (Philippines) Osmund Ng
- (Philippines) Joe Gabriel (Skills Coach)

Team manager

- (Philippines) Raffy Villavicencio
- (Philippines) Terry Capistrano
- (Philippines) Andres Reyes Jr.
- (Philippines) Mans Carpio

Legend

- (C) Team captain
- Injured

== Head coaches ==
- 1964–1978: Tito Eduque
- 1978–1986: Joaqui Trillo
- 1986–1991: Derrick Pumaren
- 1992: Gabby Velasco
- 1993–1995: Virgil Villavicencio
- 1996–1997: Jong Uichico
- 1998–2009: Franz Pumaren
- 2010–2011: Dindo Pumaren
- 2012: Gee Abanilla
- 2013–2015: Juno Sauler
- 2016–2017: Aldin Ayo
- 2018: Louie Gonzales
- 2019: Gian Nazario
- 2020–2022: Derrick Pumaren
- 2023–present: Topex Robinson

== Season-by-season records ==
Until 1997, the UAAP primarily ranked the teams by tournament points using FIBA's method. Starting in 1998, the UAAP primarily ranked by winning percentage. There's no difference in ranking once all games were played, but in the middle of the season, rankings made by these two methods may differ.

=== Until 1997 ===
| Season | League | Elimination round | | | | | Playoffs | | | |
| Season | League | Pos | GP | W | L | Pts | GP | W | L | Results |
|---|---|---|---|---|---|---|---|---|---|---|
| 1987 | UAAP | 5th/8 | 14 | 6 | 8 | 20 | Did not qualify | | | |
| 1988 | UAAP | 2nd/8 | 14 | 11 | 3 | 25 | 1 | 0 | 1 | Lost Finals vs Ateneo |
| 1989 | UAAP | 2nd/8 | 14 | 11 | 3 | 25 | 2 | 0 | 2 | Won Finals vs FEU |
| 1990 | UAAP | 1st/8 | 14 | 11 | 3 | 25 | 2 | 1 | 1 | Won Finals vs UE |
| 1991 | UAAP | 1st/8 | 14 | 12 | 2 | 26 | 1 | 0 | 1 | Lost Finals vs FEU (Note: La Salle originally won Game 1 of the Finals, but FEU immediately put the game under protest as disqualified player Tonyboy Espinosa still played for a few seconds after being called for his fifth foul. The UAAP granted FEU's protest and ordered a replay, but La Salle did not show up in the replayed game. The UAAP then awarded FEU the game, and the title, by forfeit.) |
| 1992 | UAAP | 1st/8 | 14 | 11 | 3 | 25 | 2 | 0 | 2 | Lost Finals vs FEU |
| 1993 | UAAP | 3rd/8 | 14 | 8 | 6 | 22 | No playoffs held (Note: UST won all elimination round games. Based on the rules at that time, they were then named automatic champions, and other teams were ranked by elimination round finish.) | | | |
| 1994 | UAAP | 1st/7 | 12 | 10 | 2 | 22 | 4 | 2 | 2 | Lost Finals vs UST |
| 1995 | UAAP | 2nd/8 | 14 | 10 | 4 | 24 | 4 | 2 | 2 | Lost Finals vs UST |
| 1996 | UAAP | 1st/8 | 14 | 11 | 3 | 25 | 3 | 1 | 2 | Lost Finals vs UST |
| 1997 | UAAP | 3rd/8 | 14 | 10 | 4 | 24 | 4 | 2 | 2 | Lost Finals vs FEU |

=== Since 1998 ===
| Season | League | Elimination round | | | | | | Playoffs | | | |
| Season | League | Pos | GP | W | L | PCT | GB | GP | W | L | Results |
|---|---|---|---|---|---|---|---|---|---|---|---|
| 1998 | UAAP | 1st/8 | 14 | 13 | 1 | .929 | — | 4 | 3 | 1 | Won Finals vs FEU |
| 1999 | UAAP | 1st/8 | 14 | 11 | 3 | .786 | — | 5 | 4 | 1 | Won Finals vs UST |
| 2000 | UAAP | 1st/8 | 14 | 12 | 2 | .857 | — | 3 | 3 | 0 | Won Finals vs FEU |
| 2001 | UAAP | 1st/8 | 14 | 12 | 2 | .857 | — | 4 | 3 | 1 | Won Finals vs Ateneo |
| 2002 | UAAP | 1st/8 | 14 | 13 | 1 | .929 | — | 4 | 2 | 2 | Lost Finals vs Ateneo |
| 2003 (Note: La Salle fielded two ineligible players from 2003 to 2005, which it claimed to do so unknowingly. However, the admission was made months after learning about the ineligibility. The UAAP Board forfeited their 2004–05 championship title and had to return their trophy. As a result, FEU was awarded the men's basketball championship for the 2004–05 season. The Green Archers' team standings from 2003 to 2005 were revoked and La Salle was suspended in the 2006–07 season from all UAAP events.) | UAAP | ~~4th/8~~ | ~~14~~ | ~~7~~ | ~~7~~ | ~~.500~~ | ~~4~~ | ~~2~~ | ~~1~~ | ~~1~~ | ~~Lost semifinals vs Ateneo~~ |
| 2004 | UAAP | ~~2nd/8~~ | ~~14~~ | ~~10~~ | ~~4~~ | ~~.714~~ | ~~1~~ | ~~5~~ | ~~4~~ | ~~1~~ | ~~Won Finals vs FEU~~ |
| 2005 | UAAP | ~~2nd/8~~ | ~~14~~ | ~~10~~ | ~~4~~ | ~~.714~~ | ~~2~~ | ~~3~~ | ~~1~~ | ~~2~~ | ~~Lost Finals vs FEU~~ |
| 2006 | UAAP | Suspended | | | | | | | | | |
| 2007 | UAAP | 2nd/8 | 14 | 9 | 5 | .643 | 5 | 5 | 4 | 1 | Won Finals vs UE |
| 2008 | UAAP | 2nd/8 | 14 | 10 | 4 | .714 | 3 | 4 | 2 | 2 | Lost Finals vs Ateneo |
| 2009 | UAAP | 6th/8 | 14 | 5 | 9 | .357 | 8 | Did not qualify | | | |
| 2010 | UAAP | 4th/8 | 14 | 8 | 6 | .571 | 4 | 1 | 0 | 1 | Lost semifinals vs FEU |
| 2011 | UAAP | 6th/8 | 14 | 5 | 9 | .357 | 8 | Did not qualify | | | |
| 2012 | UAAP | 4th/8 | 14 | 9 | 5 | .643 | 3 | 2 | 1 | 1 | Lost semifinals vs Ateneo |
| 2013 | UAAP | 2nd/8 | 14 | 10 | 4 | .714 | — | 5 | 4 | 1 | Won Finals vs UST |
| 2014 | UAAP | 3rd/8 | 14 | 10 | 4 | .714 | 1 | 3 | 1 | 2 | Lost semifinals vs FEU |
| 2015 | UAAP | 5th/8 | 14 | 6 | 8 | .429 | 5 | Did not qualify | | | |
| 2016 | UAAP | 1st/8 | 14 | 13 | 1 | .929 | — | 3 | 3 | 0 | Won Finals vs Ateneo |
| 2017 | UAAP | 2nd/8 | 14 | 12 | 2 | .857 | 1 | 4 | 2 | 2 | Lost Finals vs Ateneo |
| 2018 | UAAP | 5th/8 | 14 | 8 | 6 | .571 | 4 | 1 | 0 | 1 | Lost 4th seed playoff vs FEU |
| 2019 | UAAP | 5th/8 | 14 | 7 | 7 | .500 | 7 | Did not qualify | | | |
| 2020 (Note: Season cancelled due to the COVID-19 pandemic.) | UAAP | Season canceled | | | | | | | | | |
| 2022 (S84) | UAAP | 3rd/8 | 14 | 9 | 5 | .643 | 4 | 2 | 1 | 1 | Lost semifinals vs UP |
| 2022 (S85) | UAAP | 5th/8 | 14 | 7 | 7 | .500 | 4 | 1 | 0 | 1 | Lost 4th seed playoff vs Adamson |
| 2023 | UAAP | 2nd/8 | 14 | 11 | 3 | .786 | 1 | 4 | 3 | 1 | Won Finals vs UP |
| 2024 | UAAP | 1st/8 | 14 | 12 | 2 | .857 | — | 4 | 2 | 2 | Lost Finals vs UP |
| 2025 | UAAP | 4th/8 | 14 | 8 | 6 | .571 | 3 | 5 | 4 | 1 | Won Finals vs UP |
| UAAP totals since 1987 | | | 516 | 358 | 158 | .694 | — | 97 | 58 | 41 | 11 UAAP championships |

== Honors ==
=== Team awards ===
- University Athletic Association of the Philippines (UAAP)
  - Champions (11): 1989, 1990, 1998, 1999, 2000, 2001, 2007, 2013, 2016, 2023, 2025
- National Colleagiate Athletic Association (NCAA)
  - Champions (5): 1939, 1947, 1956, 1971, 1974
- National Seniors Open Championship
  - Champions (2): 1939, 1949
- Philippine Amateur Basketball League (1):
  - Champions (1): 1983
- Basketball Association of the Philippines National Open
  - Champions (1) 1983
- Basketball Association of the Philippines Inter-Collegiate Championship
  - Champions (1): 1988
- Philippine Collegiate Champions League (PCCL)
  - Champions (2): 2008, 2013
- Filoil EcoOil Preseason Cup
  - Champions (4): 2006, 2007 , 2014, 2016

=== Individual awards ===
- NCAA Most Valuable Player:
  - Lim Eng Beng (1): 1974
  - Alex Marquez (1): 1978
- UAAP Most Valuable Player:
  - Jun Limpot (3): 1989, 1990, 1992
  - Mark Telan (2): 1996, 1997
  - Don Allado (2): 1997, 1998
  - Ben Mbala (2): 2016, 2017
  - Kevin Quiambao (2): 2023, 2024
- UAAP Finals Most Valuable Player
  - Don Allado (2): 1998, 1999
  - Renren Ritualo (1): 2001
  - Mark Cardona (1): 2004
  - JVee Casio (1): 2007
  - Pocholo Villanueva (1): 2007
  - Jeron Teng (2): 2013, 2016
  - Kevin Quiambao (1): 2023
  - Mike Phillips (1): 2025
- UAAP Rookie of the Year:
  - Mark Telan (1993)
  - Renren Ritualo (1997)
  - Mike Cortez (2000)
  - Mark Cardona (2001)
  - JVee Casio (2003)
  - Jeron Teng (2012)
  - Andrei Caracut (2015)
  - Aljun Melecio (2016)
  - Kevin Quiambao (2022)

=== Retired numbers ===
La Salle had retired the numbers of three of their men's basketball players:

- #33, Kurt Bachmann
- #14, Lim Eng Beng
- #4, Renren Ritualo

== Notable players ==
- (Philippines) (United States) Abu Tratter
- (Philippines) Adonis Santa Maria
- (Philippines) Alfie Almario
- (Philippines) Alfonzo Gotladera
- (Philippines) Almond Vosotros
- (Philippines) (Germany) Arnold Van Opstal
- (Cameroon) Ben Mbala
- (Philippines) Brian Ilad
- (Philippines) Carlo Sharma
- (Philippines) Chris Tan
- (Philippines) Derrick Pumaren
- (Philippines) Dickie Bachmann
- (Philippines) Dindo Pumaren
- (Philippines) Dominic Uy
- (Philippines) Don Allado
- (Philippines) Dong Vergeire
- (Philippines) Dwight Lago
- (Philippines) Eduardo Decena
- (Philippines) (United States) Edu Manzano
- (Philippines) Elmer Lago
- (Philippines) Ervic Vijandre
- (Philippines) (United States) Evan Nelle
- (Indonesia) Ferdinand Damanik
- (Philippines) Francis Zamora
- (Philippines) Franz Pumaren
- (Philippines) Gab Banal
- (Philippines) Gee Abanilla
- (Philippines) (United States) Hyram Bagatsing
- (Philippines) (United States) Jacob Cortez
- (Philippines) (United States) Jamie Malonzo
- (Philippines) (United States) Jason Perkins
- (Philippines) Jason Webb
- (Philippines) Jeron Teng
- (Philippines) Jerwin Gaco
- (Philippines) Joaqui Trillo
- (Philippines) Jonnel Policarpio
- (Philippines) Johnedel Cardel
- (Philippines) Jong Uichico
- (Philippines) Joseph Yeo
- (Philippines) Jun Limpot
- (Philippines) Junjun Cabatu
- (Philippines) Juno Sauler
- (Philippines) Justine Baltazar
- (Philippines) JVee Casio
- (Philippines) Kean Baclaan
- (Philippines) Kevin Quiambao
- (Philippines) Kib Montalbo
- (Philippines) Kurt Bachmann
- (Philippines) LA Revilla
- (Philippines) Leonard Santillan
- (Philippines) Leo Prieto
- (Philippines) (China) Lim Eng Beng
- (Philippines) Luigi Trillo
- (Philippines) Mac Cuan
- (Philippines) Mac Tallo
- (Philippines) Manuel Araneta, Jr.
- (Philippines) Mark Cardona
- (Philippines) Mark Telan
- (Philippines) Martin Urra
- (Philippines) (United States) Mike Cortez
- (Philippines) (United States) Mike Phillips
- (Philippines) Mikee Romero
- (Philippines) Mon Jose
- (Philippines) Nico Elorde
- (Philippines) Noli Locsin
- (Philippines) (Canada) Norbert Torres
- (Philippines) Oliver Agapito
- (Philippines) Pocholo Villanueva
- (Philippines) Ramon Campos Jr.
- (Philippines) Renren Ritualo
- (Philippines) (United States) Ricardo Brown
- (Philippines) Ricci Rivero
- (Philippines) Richard del Rosario
- (Philippines) Rico Maierhofer
- (Philippines) Robert Bolick
- (Philippines) Ryan Arana
- (Philippines) Simon Atkins
- (Philippines) Teddy Alfarero
- (Philippines) Thomas Torres
- (Philippines) Tonyboy Espinosa
- (Philippines) TY Tang
- (Philippines) Valentin Eduque
- (Philippines) (United States) Willy Wilson
- (Philippines) Yves Dignadice

== Uniform ==
=== Manufacturer ===
- 1996–1997: Reebok
- 1998–2002: Fila
- 2003: Adidas
- 2004: K-Swiss
- 2005–2007: Accel
- 2008–2010: Adidas
- 2011–present: Nike

== See also ==
- De La Salle University
  - De La Salle Green Archers and Lady Archers
    - De La Salle Green Spikers volleyball
    - De La Salle Lady Spikers volleyball
    - De La Salle Lady Booters football
