= De La Salle Green Archers and Lady Archers =

Varsity teams representing De La Salle University

- School: De La Salle University
- League: UAAP
- Joined: 1986 (NCAA founding member – 1924)
- Location: College (DLSU) – 2401 Taft Avenue, Manila, Metro Manila, Philippines; High School (DLSZ) – University Avenue, Ayala Alabang Village, Muntinlupa, Metro Manila, Philippines
- Team colors: Green and white
- Juniors' team: Zobel Junior Archers and Lady Junior Archers

Seniors' general championships
- UAAP: 3 2012–13, 2013–14, 2015–16; NCAA: 5 1972–73, 1974–75, 1976–77, 1977–78, 1980–81

Juniors' general championships
- UAAP: none; NCAA: 10 1965–66, 1966–67 (DLSC High School) 1971–72, 1973–74, 1974–75, 1975–76, 1977–78, 1978–79, 1979–80, 1980–81 (LSGH)

The De La Salle Green Archers and Lady Archers are the varsity teams representing De La Salle University in the University Athletic Association of the Philippines, among other leagues. The "Green Archer" is the traditional university mascot. While the university's teams are collectively referred to as the Green Archers and Lady Archers, each team carries a specific moniker that references the sport that they play. At the high school level, the university is represented by De La Salle Santiago Zobel School's varsity program called the Zobel Junior Archers and Lady Junior Archers.

== Athletic history ==
=== Team identity ===
In 1924, De La Salle College (DLSC) became a pre-war founding member of the National Collegiate Athletic Association (NCAA). Irish-American Br. Celba John Lynam, FSC, organized the first La Salle sports teams. The colors of green and white were chosen as the official La Salle colors; green was inspired by the national color of Ireland, where the original founding fathers of the De La Salle Christian Brothers originated from, while white represents the Philippines as the Pearl of the Orient Seas. The pre-war NCAA was the first and oldest collegiate athletic association in the Philippines composed of De La Salle College, San Beda College, University of the Philippines, University of Santo Tomas, Institute of Accounts (now Far Eastern University), National University, Ateneo de Manila, and University of Manila.

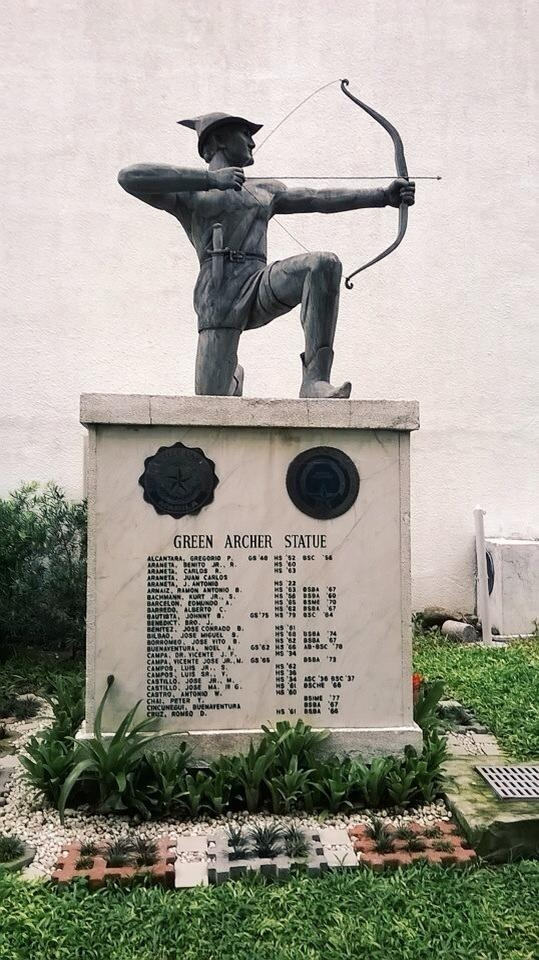
The Green Archer statue

La Salle student athletes were first referred to as the Green Archers during the basketball games of NCAA Season 16 (1939–40), where La Salle made its way to the finals and won against their eventual archrival Ateneo in an upset for its first basketball championship title in the seniors' division of the NCAA. Accordingly, the news reporters who were covering La Salle games at that time coined the team the "Green Archers" due in part to the La Salle players' accurate shooting skills. The first Green Archer symbol then appeared in the school's student yearbook publication, Green and White, in 1940, officially becoming the school mascot. The De La Salle Alumni Association (DLSAA) has three official Green Archer mascots – Gordo, Flaco, and Sally. The Green Archer statue standing in the central plaza was done by Ed Castrillo in 1985. It was first exhibited during the celebration of the Diamond Jubilee in 1986.

==== Monikers ====
While the university's athletic programs uses the Green Archer, each team has differing monikers corresponding to the sport and gender. In addition, for the Zobel Junior Archers, the word junior is added for their teams. The names are listed below.

| Sport | Men | Women | Boys | Girls |
|---|---|---|---|---|
| Basketball | Green Archers | Lady Archers | Junior Archers | Junior Lady Archers |
| Volleyball | Green Spikers | Lady Spikers | Junior Green Spikers | Junior Lady Spikers |
| Beach volleyball | Green Spikers | Lady Spikers | Junior Green Spikers | Junior Lady Spikers |
| Football | Green Booters | Lady Booters | Junior Archers | No team |
| Baseball | Green Batters | No team | Junior Archers | No team |
| Softball | No team | Lady Batters | No team | |
| Judo | Green Judokas | Lady Judokas | Junior Green Judokas | Junior Lady Judokas |
| Taekwondo | Green Jins | Lady Jins | Junior Green Jins | No team |
| Fencing | Green Fencers | Lady Fencers | Junior Green Fencers | Junior Lady Fencers |
| Swimming | Green Tankers | Lady Tankers | Junior Green Tankers | Junior Lady Tankers |
| Track and field | Green Tracksters | Lady Tracksters | Junior Green Tracksters | Junior Lady Tracksters |
| Badminton | Green Shuttlers | Lady Shuttlers | No team | |
| Tennis | Green Tennisters | Lady Tennisters | No team | |
| Table tennis | Green Paddlers | Lady Paddlers | No team | |
| Chess | Green Woodpushers | Lady Woodpushers | No team | |
| Cheerleading | Animo Squad | | No team | |
| Streetdance | Dance Company | | Dance Crew | |
| Esport | Green Aces; Competes as Viridis Arcus Esports (VA) outside the UAAP | | No team | |
| Golf | Green Golfers | Lady Golfers | No team | |

=== Participation history ===
La Salle participated in the NCAA for 57 years from 1924 to 1981, winning five NCAA General Championships in the process (1972–73, 1974–75, 1976–77, 1977–78, and 1980–81). La Salle announced its decision to leave the NCAA in a press conference in September 1980, effective after the then ongoing 1980–81 NCAA Season due to a violent basketball game against their archrivals at the time, the Letran Knights. The high school (juniors' division) counterparts were the Greenies from De La Salle College High School until 1967 when the then-high school in Taft Avenue, Manila was phased out and transferred to the La Salle Green Hills (LSGH) campus in Ortigas Avenue, Mandaluyong City, Metro Manila. The Greenies had won two General Championships under DLSC. La Salle Green Hills was established in 1959 and was eventually made the high school counterpart of De La Salle College in 1968 and inherited the Greenies moniker. LSGH won eight NCAA General Championships until 1981 when La Salle withdrew from the NCAA.

From 1981 through 1985, the school participated in the Philippine Integrated Colleges and Universities Athletic Association (PICUAA), invitational meets, interclub tournaments, and the National Open. De La Salle University (DLSU) then joined the University Athletic Association of the Philippines (UAAP) in 1986. La Salle chose the newly established De La Salle Santiago Zobel School (DLSZ) as their UAAP Junior counterpart and adopted the Junior Archers moniker. LSGH was later asked by De La Salle–College of Saint Benilde to compete as their high school junior team in the NCAA when it applied and was accepted in 1998. Ever since joining the UAAP in 1986, DLSU has won three UAAP General Championships – Season 75 (2012–13), Season 76 (2013–14), and Season 78 (2015–16), giving the university a combined eight General Championship titles in the seniors' division in the NCAA and UAAP. Notable Lasallian athletes and alumni are inducted into the DLSAA Sports Hall of Fame.

== Sports ==
=== Basketball ===
La Salle has a total of 29 basketball championship titles in the NCAA and UAAP combined. Under its membership stint in the NCAA, La Salle won 11 championship titles – five under the men's division and six under the juniors' division. In the UAAP, the school has 18 championship titles – 11 in the men's division, five in the women's division, and two in the juniors' division.

==== Men's basketball ====
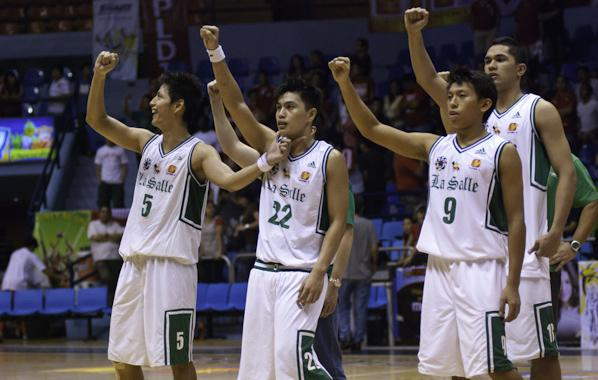
The De La Salle Green Archers in 2010

La Salle has five NCAA basketball titles – in 1939, 1947, 1956, 1971, and 1974. The Green Archers won the coveted National Seniors Open Championship, a league participated by top commercial and college teams, twice in 1939 and 1949. After bolting out of the NCAA in 1981, it participated in various tournaments. The Green Archers won the 1983 Philippine Amateur Basketball League (PABL) Championship and the 1983 National Open title. La Salle has won three inter-collegiate titles. The school won the 1988 Philippine Intercollegiate Championship. This was later reformatted to become the Collegiate Champions League (CCL), which then became the current Philippine Collegiate Championship League (PCCL), with La Salle winning the championship in 2008 and 2013.

The Green Archers have won 11 UAAP basketball titles – 1989, 1990, 1998, 1999, 2000, 2001, 2007, 2013, 2016, 2023, and 2025. La Salle's basketball program is known for having the most finals appearance with 19, as well as the longest consecutive finals appearance with nine from 1994 to 2002. The program is also known for having won four straight UAAP championship titles from 1998 to 2001. The Green Archers are also known for sharing a rivalry with other competitive teams in the UAAP, especially with the Ateneo Blue Eagles, UST Growling Tigers, and FEU Tamaraws. In UAAP Season 88, the Green Archers became the second fourth seed team to win the title after the NU Bulldogs from UAAP Season 77 in 2014. La Salle dethroned the UP Fighting Maroons during the best-of-three series, having lost Game 2 but won Games 1 and 3.

Before the start of the UAAP season, the Green Archers participate in multiple preseason tournaments. In the Filoil EcoOil Preseason Cup they have won four titles, the latest being the 2016 championship. The Green Archers participated in the Buddha Light International Association (BLIA) Cup, where they last won the championship in 2017. The Green Archers have also participated in the PBA D-League Aspirants' Cup as EcoOil–La Salle, where they have won three straight championships. In the Pinoyliga Collegiate Cup, the Green Archers won their first title in 2024. In August 2024, the Green Archers swept the 2024 World University Basketball Series in Tokyo, Japan. La Salle has also participated in the AsiaBasket tournaments. In May 2025, the Green Archers won against the Ateneo Blue Eagles to claim the championship of the 2025 AsiaBasket College Campus Tour. In August 2026, the Green Archers swept the University Top League (UTL) tournament in Japan to win the title.

La Salle's basketball program has produced a crop of national players and coaches. Its notable players include Leo Prieto, Ramoncito Campos, Manuel Araneta, Martin Urra, Kurt Bachmann, Lim Eng Beng, Ricardo Brown, Franz Pumaren, Dindo Pumaren, Jun Limpot, Johnedel Cardel, Richard del Rosario, Tonyboy Espinosa, Mark Telan, Jason Webb, Don Allado, Renren Ritualo, Mon Jose, Adonis Santa Maria, Mike Cortez, Willy Wilson, Mark Cardona, Joseph Yeo, Carlo Sharma, Jerwin Gaco, Ryan Arana, TY Tang, JVee Casio, Rico Maierhofer, Simon Atkins, LA Revilla, Almond Vosotros, Arnold Van Opstal, Norbert Torres, Jeron Teng, Thomas Torres, Kib Montalbo, Jason Perkins, Abu Tratter, Ben Mbala, Justine Baltazar, Leonard Santillan, Jamie Malonzo, Evan Nelle, and Kevin Quiambao. Its homegrown Lasallian coaches have included Chito Calvo, Leo Prieto, Tito Eduque, Jong Uichico, Virgil Villavicencio, Gee Abanilla, Juno Sauler, Topex Robinson, and the Pumaren brothers – Derrick, who won DLSU's first back-to-back UAAP basketball championship, Dindo, and Franz, who holds the distinction of having won five UAAP basketball championship titles with his Green Archer teams.

==== Women's basketball ====
The Lady Archers have won a total of five championship titles. They were UAAP title holders from 1999 through 2002. Their most recent championship was in UAAP Season 76 in 2013.

=== 3x3 basketball ===
The Green Archers won the UAAP Season 85 3x3 basketball tournament in 2023. They retained the title the following year in UAAP Season 86. They won their third consecutive title in UAAP Season 87. In UAAP Season 88, the Green Archers swept the tournament en route to their fourth consecutive championship.

=== Football ===
La Salle has a total of 67 football championship titles in the NCAA and UAAP combined. Under its membership stint in the NCAA, La Salle won 51 championship titles – 21 under the men's division and 30 under the juniors' division. In the UAAP, the school has 16 championship titles – four in the men's division, 11 in the women's division, and one in the juniors' division.

==== Men's football ====
De La Salle has the most football championships in Philippine NCAA history, totaling 21 collegiate championships. The high school team has 30 championship trophies. The school's golden era of football was from 1932 through 1940 when La Salle won nine consecutive championships. La Salle was also the NCAA Senior Division champion from 1971 through 1977. Notable players include Roderico Reyes, Joey Veloso, Johnny Sun, Julian "Julep" Lao, Inaki Vicente, Mike Moran, Danny Moran, Dicky Moran, Robs Delfino, Iñaki Alvarez, Ike Monserrat, Babes Tan, Christian Lozano, Alvin Ocampo, Jose Pons, and Albe Aparilla. The Juniors team was champion from 1937 to 1941 and from 1971 through 1976. The school was NCAA double champions in both Junior and Senior divisions from 1937 through 1940. La Salle was also the NCAA double champion in both Junior and Senior divisions from 1971 through 1976. DLSU left the NCAA after the 1980–81 Season and eventually transferred to the UAAP.

In the UAAP, the men's team has won four titles. The DLSU men's football team captured its first-ever solo UAAP championship via a sweep in UAAP Season 57. The team was coached by Hans Smit.

In UAAP Season 54, DLSU was declared joint UAAP champions with UST.

In UAAP Season 56, La Salle lost to UST 4–0 in the championship game. The following year, in UAAP Season 57, La Salle dethroned UST to win its second UAAP championship title.

In UAAP Season 58, the team lost to Ateneo de Manila University in the Finals.

In UAAP Season 59, DLSU won the Finals against Ateneo 5–1.

DLSU successfully defended its crown in UAAP Season 60 and captured back-to-back championships.

=== Volleyball ===
La Salle has a total of 44 volleyball championship titles in the NCAA and UAAP combined. Under its membership stint in the NCAA, La Salle won 12 championship titles – four under the men's division, seven under the juniors' division, and one under the women's division. In the UAAP, the school has 32 championship titles – two in the men's division, 13 in the women's division, seven in the boys' division, and 10 in the girls' division.

=== Beach volleyball ===
The Lady Green Spikers were champions of the UAAP Season 78 Beach Volleyball tournament after defeating FEU in two final games.

=== Softball ===
La Salle has a total of 11 softball championship titles during their membership stint in the NCAA. In the seniors' division, La Salle won three titles. The Green Archers won their first NCAA softball championship in 1974 and were also back-to-back champions in 1976 and 1977. In the juniors' division, La Salle won eight titles. DLSC High School were back-to-back champions in 1966 and 1967. La Salle Green Hills then won five straight championships from 1970 to 1974. The last championship from LSGH came in 1980 before La Salle left the NCAA in 1981. The sport was discontinued in the NCAA in 1986.

=== Baseball ===
La Salle has a total of 10 championship titles in UAAP Baseball. In UAAP Season 78, La Salle ended a 13-year title drought and beat Ateneo, who were the defending champions. La Salle won their fifth championship title after defeating Ateneo in three games in the UAAP Season 81 Finals. The Green Batters won their sixth title after sweeping UP in the finals of UAAP Season 85. In the juniors' division, the De La Salle Zobel baseball team has won four titles. They won their first title in UAAP Season 74 when baseball was introduced in the junior' division. They also won back-to-back titles in UAAP Season 76 and UAAP Season 77. Their last championship was in UAAP Season 79.

=== Tennis ===
La Salle has a total of 29 tennis championship titles in the NCAA and UAAP. Since 1953, when the school won its first NCAA trophy, the men's team has won 14 titles. The Green Archers last won the championship in 2012 (UAAP Season 74). They defeated the NU Bulldogs 3–2 in the finals, completed a tournament sweep, and posted an 11–0 win-loss record.

The women's team has won six titles since the introduction of tennis in the women's division in UAAP Season 64. They won their first title in 2003 (UAAP Season 65) and were champions from 2003 through 2005. In 2005 (UAAP Season 67), the Lady Archers defeated Ateneo in the finals. The Lady Archers were also back-to-back champions in UAAP Season 72 and UAAP Season 73, where they defeated the UST Tigresses. In UAAP Season 75, DLSU regained the championship from UST and completed their bid for a sixth overall title. In the juniors' division, La Salle won nine NCAA championship titles.

=== Table tennis ===
La Salle has a total of 18 championship titles in UAAP Table Tennis. In the seniors' division, La Salle has won 13 table tennis championships and posted a back-to-back double championship in 2014 and 2015. In the men's division, the school took home their first trophy in 1997. The Green Paddlers were also champions in UAAP Seasons 76 to 78 (2013–2015). In the women's division, La Salle won their first title in 2004 and were champions in UAAP Seasons 77 to 80 (2014–2017). Ian Lariba led the Lady Paddlers to multiple UAAP titles and won multiple MVPs. She competed in the 2016 Summer Olympics and was the Philippine Olympic Team flag bearer. In April 2019, Lariba's jersey was retired and raised to the La Salle rafters at the Enrique M. Razon Sports Center, the first time that DLSU retired a jersey of an athlete from a non-team sport. The Lady Paddlers won their seventh championship in UAAP Season 85. They retained the title the following season. In the juniors' division, La Salle has won five titles, including double championships in UAAP Season 78 and UAAP Season 82. The Junior Green Paddlers won their third title in UAAP Season 85. La Salle holds the distinction of being the first team to win the gold in all four gender groups of a particular UAAP sport through its table tennis teams in 2015.

=== Badminton ===
La Salle has a total of six championship titles in collegiate badminton. The men's badminton team captured their first and only championship title in UAAP Season 70. The women's badminton team were title holders in UAAP Season 65 and back-to-back champions in UAAP Season 67 and UAAP Season 68. They secured their fourth championship in UAAP Season 72, and their fifth championship in UAAP Season 80.

=== Swimming ===
La Salle has a total of 30 swimming championship titles in the NCAA and UAAP. In the seniors' division, La Salle has won 12 men's titles and five women's titles. The school won its first and only title in the NCAA in 1935. The last title of the men's team came in UAAP Season 74 in 2011. The men's team were twice 3-peat champions from UAAP Seasons 53 to 55 (1990–1992) and UAAP Season 63 to 65 (2000–2002). They were also back-to-back champions in UAAP Season 57 and UAAP Season 58. The women's team won their first title in UAAP Season 53 and were back-to-back champions in UAAP Season 65 and UAAP Season 66. In UAAP Season 85, the Lady Green Tankers ended their 19-year championship drought and won their fifth title.

La Salle had swimming champions in the 1930s, featuring the Von Giese brothers. Eric Buhain was an accomplished swimmer at an early age. He was a multiple gold medalist in the 1985, 1991, and 1993 SEA Games and represented the Philippines in the 1992 Summer Olympics. Actor and model Enchong Dee led the Green Archers to the UAAP Season 72 title and, in the process, won seven gold medals in the 800 and 1,500-meter freestyle, 200 and 400-meter individual medley, as well as 50, 100, and 200-meter butterfly. He is also a 3-time UAAP MVP. In the juniors' division, La Salle has nine NCAA titles and four UAAP titles.

=== Track and field ===
La Salle has a total of 28 track and field championship titles in the NCAA and UAAP. La Salle has won 13 men's track and field collegiate titles. From 1972 through 1978, the school won seven consecutive championships. During that run, Arthur Pons, the Philippine Decathlon champion, was a member of the 1972–1973 track teams. The last title came in 2004. In the women's division, the Lady Tracksters won their first championship in 2023. The championship marks DLSU's first track and field title since 2004 and the second athletics title since joining the UAAP in 1986. In the juniors' division, La Salle won 14 titles in the NCAA.

=== Taekwondo Kyorugi and Poomsae ===
La Salle has a total of 10 championship titles in UAAP Taekwondo Kyorugi. The men's taekwondo kyorugi team has won five titles – 1998, 1999, 2011, 2013, and 2024. The women's taekwondo kyorugi team has won five titles – 1998, 1999, 2001, 2002, and 2012. Stephen Fernandez won the taekwondo bronze medal during the 1992 Barcelona Olympics. In UAAP Taekwondo Poomsae, La Salle has won three championship titles. The first championship came in UAAP Season 79. La Salle then won back-to-back titles in UAAP Season 81 and UAAP Season 82.

=== Judo ===
The men's team won their first UAAP Judo title in 1992. In 2013, the women's team won their first championship and ended the school's 21-year title drought.

=== Chess ===
La Salle has a total of 20 championship titles in chess. In the seniors' division, La Salle has won seven men's titles and nine women's titles. The school holds the longest winning streak in UAAP Chess Championship history. La Salle was men's UAAP Chess 6-peat champion from 1999 through 2004. John Paul Gomez was a Grandmaster in the 2008 World Chess Olympiad. Gomez won five MVP awards for chess and was also the 2009 UAAP Athlete of the Year. The women's team were 4-peat champions from UAAP Seasons 73 to 76. In the juniors' division, La Salle won four consecutive championships in NCAA Seasons 53 to 56 (1977–1980).

=== Esports ===
Esports was introduced in UAAP Season 87. La Salle won the first semester Season 87 Valorant tournament in 2024. They retained the title in the second semester in 2025. La Salle also won the UAAP Season 87 MLBB championship in the second semester.

=== Golf ===
Golf was introduced in UAAP Season 88. La Salle won both the men's and women's tournament of that season.

=== Seniors division ===
As of 2026, De La Salle University has 201 collegiate championships in the men's and women's divisions combined. This includes championships while competing in the NCAA from 1924 through 1981 and UAAP from 1986 through the present. La Salle also has a total of eight General Championship titles, having won five in the NCAA and three in the UAAP.

==== Men's sports ====
- 3x3 Basketball (4) – 2022–23, 2023–24, 2024–25, 2025–26
- Badminton (1) – 2007–08
- Baseball (6) – 1995–96, 1999–00, 2002–03, 2015–16, 2018–19, 2022–23
- Basketball (16) – 1939–40, 1947–48, 1956–57, 1971–72, 1974–75, 1989–90, 1990–91, 1998–99, 1999–00, 2000–01, 2001–02, 2007–08, 2013–14, 2016–17, 2023–24, 2025–26
- Chess (7) – 1999–00, 2000–01, 2001–02, 2002–03, 2003–04, 2004–05, 2014–15
- Football (25) – 1932–33, 1933–34, 1934–35, 1935–36, 1936–37, 1937–38, 1938–39, 1939–40, 1940–41, 1947–48, 1949–50, 1951–52, 1952–53, 1965–66, 1966–67, 1971–72, 1972–73, 1974–75, 1975–76, 1976–77, 1977–78, 1991–92, 1994–95, 1996–97, 1997–98
- Golf (1) – 2025–26
- Judo (1) – 1991–92
- Softball (3) – 1974–75, 1976–77, 1977–78
- Swimming (12) – 1935–36, 1988–89, 1990–91, 1991–92, 1992–93, 1994–95, 1995–96, 2000–01, 2001–02, 2002–03, 2009–10, 2011–12
- Table Tennis (5) – 1997–98, 2000–01, 2013–14, 2014–15, 2015–16
- Taekwondo Kyorugi (5) – 1997–98, 1998–99, 2010–11, 2013–14, 2024–25
- Tennis (14) – 1953–54, 1954–55, 1956–57, 1957–58, 1958–59, 1965–66, 1980–81, 1990–91, 1994–95, 1995–96, 2003–04, 2005–06, 2008–09, 2011–12
- Track and Field (13) – 1925–26, 1926–27, 1933–34, 1935–36, 1972–73, 1973–74, 1974–75, 1975–76, 1976–77, 1977–78, 1978–79, 1980–81, 2004–05
- Volleyball (6) – 1977–78, 1978–79, 1979–80, 1980–81, 2001–02, 2003–04

==== Women's sports ====
- Badminton (5) – 2002–03, 2004–05, 2005–06, 2009–10, 2017–18
- Basketball (5) – 1999–00, 2000–01, 2001–02, 2002–03, 2013–14
- Beach Volleyball (1) – 2015–16
- Chess (9) – 2002–03, 2008–09, 2010–11, 2011–12, 2012–13, 2013–14, 2015–16, 2017–18, 2018–19
- Football (11) – 1995–96, 1998–99, 1999–00, 2002–03, 2003–04, 2004–05, 2005–06, 2009–10, 2016–17, 2017–18, 2018–19
- Golf (1) – 2025–26
- Judo (1) – 2013–14
- Swimming (5) – 1990–91, 1996–97, 2002–03, 2003–04, 2022–23
- Table Tennis (8) – 2004–05, 2012–13, 2014–15, 2015–16, 2016–17, 2017–18, 2022–23, 2023–24
- Taekwondo Kyorugi (5) – 1997–98, 1998–99, 2000–01, 2001–02, 2012–13
- Tennis (6) – 2002–03, 2003–04, 2004–05, 2009–10, 2010–11, 2012–13
- Track and Field (1) – 2023–24
- Volleyball (14) – 1975–76, 1999–00, 2003–04, 2004–05, 2005–06, 2008–09, 2010–11, 2011–12, 2012–13, 2015–16, 2016–17, 2017–18, 2022–23, 2025–26

==== Coed sports ====
- Taekwondo Poomsae (3) – 2016–17, 2018–19, 2019–20
- Street dance (4) – 2010–11, 2011–12, 2016–17, 2018–19
- Esports
  - First Semester
    - Valorant (1) – 2024–25
  - Second Semester
    - Valorant (1) – 2024–25
    - MLBB (1) – 2024–25

=== Juniors division ===
The junior teams representing La Salle have won 120 high school championships, including 10 NCAA General Championship titles. DLSC High School won the first two General Championships, and the other eight were won by La Salle Green Hills (LSGH). During their membership stint in the NCAA, La Salle's juniors team was represented first by DLSC High School from 1924 to 1967, followed by La Salle Green Hills from 1968 to 1981, when La Salle withdrew from the league. Presently in the UAAP, La Salle is represented by De La Salle Santiago Zobel School (DLSZ) ever since it was admitted into the league in 1986.

==== Boys' sports ====
- Baseball (4) – 2011–12, 2013–14, 2014–15, 2016–17
- Basketball (8) – 1924–25, 1931–32, 1934–35, 1939–40, 1951–52, 1955–56, 2005–06, 2007–08
- Chess (4) – 1977–78, 1978–79, 1979–80, 1980–81
- Football (31) – 1924–25, 1926–27, 1927–28, 1928–29, 1929–30, 1932–33, 1933–34, 1934–35, 1935–36, 1937–38, 1938–39, 1939–40, 1940–41, 1941–42, 1948–49, 1949–50, 1955–56, 1957–58, 1960–61, 1966–67, 1967–68, 1968–69, 1969–70, 1971–72, 1972–73, 1974–75, 1975–76, 1976–77, 1979–80, 1980–81, 2007–08
- Softball (8) – 1966–67, 1967–68, 1970–71, 1971–72, 1972–73, 1973–74, 1974–75, 1980–81
- Swimming (10) – 1934–35, 1935–36, 1938–39, 1974–75, 1976–77, 1977–78, 1978–79, 1979–80, 1980–81, 2018–19
- Table Tennis (3) – 2015–16, 2019–20, 2022–23
- Tennis (9) – 1949–50, 1951–52, 1952–53, 1953–54, 1956–57, 1959–60, 1960–61, 1965–66, 1979–80
- Track and Field (14) – 1925–26, 1926–27, 1933–34, 1935–36, 1955–56, 1956–57, 1957–58, 1958–59, 1959–60, 1969–70, 1975–76, 1976–77, 1977–78, 1978–79
- Volleyball (14) – 1965–66, 1966–67, 1971–72, 1977–78, 1978–79, 1979–80, 1980–81, 1994–95, 1995–96, 1996–97, 1997–98, 1998–99, 1999–00, 2003–04

==== Girls' sports ====
- Swimming (3) – 2016–17, 2017–18, 2018–19
- Table Tennis (2) – 2015–16, 2019–20
- Volleyball (10) – 1994–95, 1995–96, 1996–97, 1997–98, 1998–99, 2002–03, 2010–11, 2011–12, 2012–13, 2018–19

== Other notable athletic alumni ==
- Paeng Nepomuceno – Six-time World Bowling Champion. International Bowling Hall of Fame; IOC (International Olympic Committee) President's Trophy; International Bowling Athlete of the Millenium (1999); 4-time Guinness World Records; Philippine Sportswriters Athlete of the Century (1999)
- Hidilyn Diaz – Weightlifting Gold medalist in the 2020 Tokyo Summer Olympics (first Filipino to win Gold in Summer Olympics). She is also an Olympic weightlifting record-holder by winning the women's 55 kg category for weightlifting at the 2020 Summer Olympics.
- Luis Gabriel Moreno – Archery Gold medalist – 2014 Nanjing Summer Youth Olympics (first Filipino to win Gold in IOC Youth Olympics)
- Stephen Fernandez – Taekwondo Bronze medalist – 1992 Barcelona Olympics; Taekwondo Gold – 1987 SEA Games
- John Paul Gomez – Chess grandmaster, Filipino Chess Champion (2008), 5-time Filipino World Chess Olympiad team member (2008–2018), 5-time UAAP MVP Award winner for chess and Season 71 (2008–09) UAAP Athlete of the Year
- Edna Ledesma-Asano – Dance Sport Blackpool World Champion – 2005; DLSAA Sports Achievement Awardee
- Ian Lariba – 2016 London Summer Olympics Philippine Flagbearer; Philippine National Games: 1st (2013, 2014, 2016); Multiple UAAP Table Tennis Championships and MVP; UAAP Athlete of the Year (2014 and 2015)
- Marcus Araneta Valda – Individual Gold in Greco-Roman Wrestling – 2003 SEA Games; Individual Gold Freestyle Wrestling – 2003 and 2005 SEA Games; DLSAA Sports Achievement Awardee
- John Paul Lizardo – Men's TKD Finweight gold; DLSAA Sports Achievement Awardee
- Eric Buhain – Multiple Swimming Gold – 1985, 1991, and 1993 SEA Games; Olympian – 1992 Summer Olympics; Chairman, Philippine Sports Commission; Chairman, Philippine Games and Amusement Board
- Joseph Orillana – 2007 Baseball Philippines MVP and Best Pitcher; Baseball Team Gold; DLSAA Sports Achievement Awardee
- Liza del Rosario – Bowling Gold – 2005 SEA Games
- Poch Juinio – Alaska – 1996 PBA Grand Slam Champions; 2000 PBA All-Filipino Finals MVP
- Yeng Guiao – 2009 and 2019 Philippine National Basketball Team Head Coach; Multi-titled PBA championship coach
- Perry Ronquillo – 1998–99 PBA championship coach
- Manilla Santos – UAAP Season 71 Women's Volleyball Season MVP and Best Receiver
- Cha Cruz-Behag – UAAP Season 73 and 74 Women's Volleyball Finals MVP, 2015 Philippine Super Liga All-Filipino Conference 1st Best Outside Spiker
- Melissa Gohing – UAAP Season 71 Women's Volleyball Rookie of the Year
- Michele Gumabao – UAAP Season 73 and 74 Women's Volleyball Best Blocker, UAAP Season 75 Women's Volleyball Finals MVP, 2016 Shakey's V-League Reinforced Open Conference Finals MVP
- Aby Maraño – UAAP Season 74 and 75 Women's Volleyball Season MVP, UAAP Season 75 Women's Volleyball Best Blocker, Philippine Volleyball Women's National Team Captain (2018–2023)
- Mika Reyes – 2014 Philippine National Games Best Blocker, 2015 Philippine National Games 1st Best Middle Blocker
- Ara Galang – UAAP Season 74 Women's Volleyball Rookie of the Year and Best Server, UAAP Season 75 Women's Volleyball Season MVP
- Mary Joy Baron – UAAP Season 78 Women's Volleyball Best Blocker, UAAP Season 79 Women's Volleyball Season MVP, Philippine Volleyball Women's National Team Main Stay, 2019 ASEAN Grand Prix Best Middle Blocker (Leg 1 and Leg 2)
- Kim Kianna Dy – UAAP Season 78 Women's Volleyball Finals MVP, Philippine Volleyball Women's National Team Main Stay
- Kim Fajardo – UAAP Season 76, 78, and 79 Women's Volleyball Best Setter, UAAP Season 79 Women's Volleyball Best Server
- Dawn Macandili – UAAP Season 78 Women's Volleyball Best Digger and Receiver, UAAP Season 79 Women's Volleyball Best Receiver, UAAP Season 80 Women's Volleyball Finals MVP, 2017 Asian Women's Volleyball Championship 2nd Best Libero
- Desiree Cheng – UAAP Season 79 Women's Volleyball Finals MVP; UAAP Season 80 Women's Volleyball Best Server
- Thea Gagate – UAAP Season 84, 85, and 86 Women's Volleyball 1st Best Middle Blocker

== Enrique M. Razon Sports Center ==
The Enrique M. Razon Sports Center is a 10-story building that is the main sports facility of De La Salle University. The Sports Center was built in 1998 to replace the old Brother Athanasius Sports Complex which was demolished in 2000 to give way for the construction of the Don Enrique T. Yuchengco Hall. The Sports Center stands on a 3,155-square-meter (33,960 sq ft) lot located at the corner of Fidel Reyes (formerly named Agno) and Noli Streets. It has an Olympic-sized pool and track and field oval with a balcony. It has basketball and volleyball courts, table tennis courts, a dance and martial arts studio, and weight training rooms. The sixth floor of the building is the location of the George T. Yang Performing Arts Studios. The sixth floor also houses the Gold's Gym Taft branch, which opened in late 2016.

== Rivalry with Ateneo de Manila University ==
The school rivalry between Ateneo de Manila University and De La Salle University began when both educational institutions participated in the National Collegiate Athletic Association (NCAA) and has carried over to the University Athletic Association of the Philippines (UAAP) where both universities compete in currently.

Beginning with UAAP Season 84 in May 2022, Ateneo de Manila University decided to unify student-athletes and varsity teams under the "Blue Eagles" moniker moving forward, regardless of sport, gender, or age group. Meanwhile, the Green Archer is the traditional mascot of De La Salle University and the varsity teams are collectively referred to as the "Green Archers", however, each team carries a specific moniker that references the sport that they play.

Ateneo and La Salle were both co-founders of the NCAA in 1924, until Ateneo left the league in 1978 to join the UAAP in the same year while La Salle announced its decision to leave the NCAA in a press conference in September 1980, effective after the then ongoing 1980–81 NCAA Season. Both Catholic private schools in the Metro Manila area have been competing against each other in the UAAP ever since La Salle was also admitted to join the league in 1986.

== Rivalry with University of Santo Tomas ==
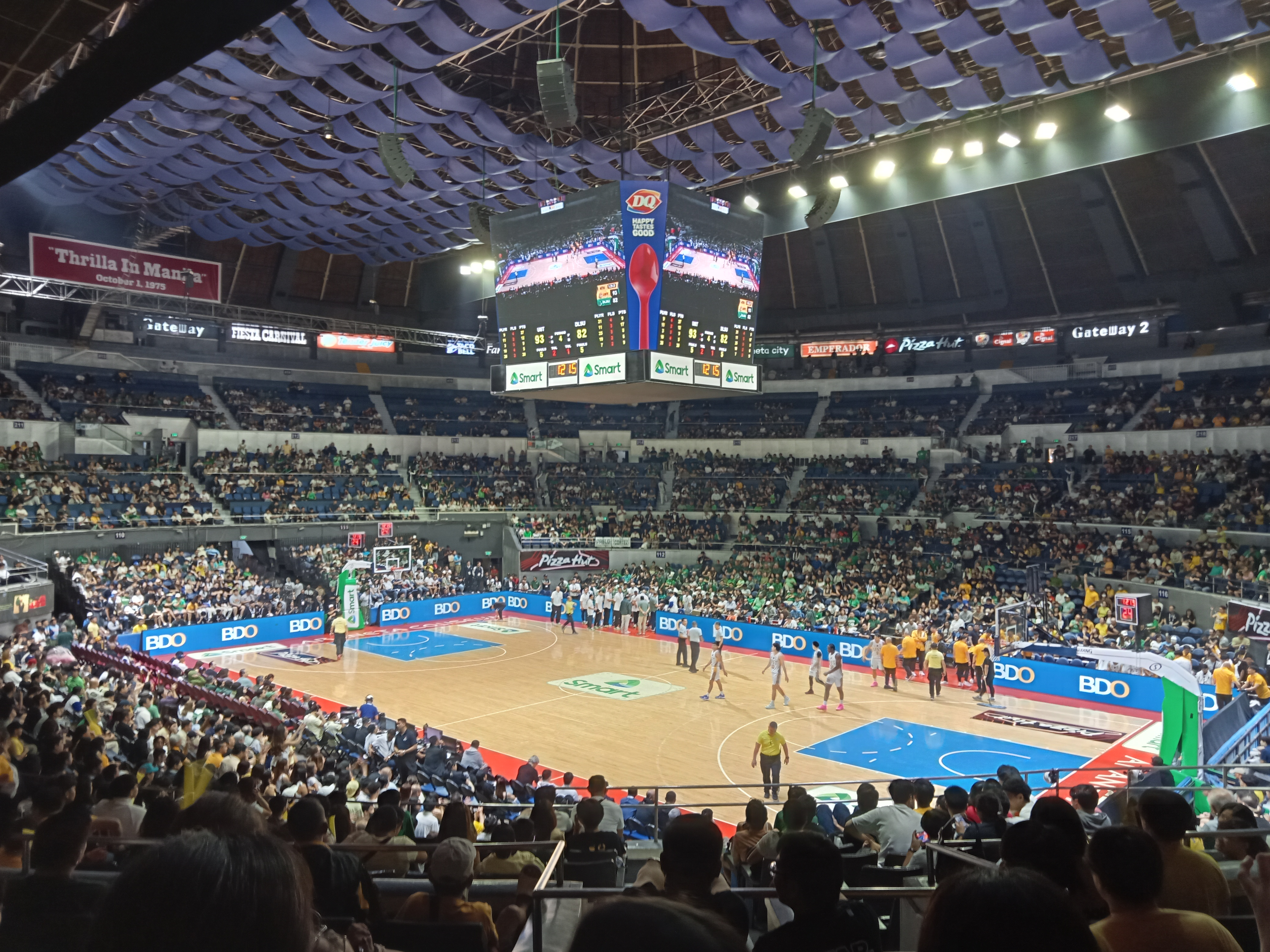
UAAP Season 88 basketball tournaments men's 1st round game between UST and La Salle.

The rivalry between the De La Salle University (DLSU) Green Archers and the University of Santo Tomas (UST) Growling Tigers is contested at the University Athletic Association of the Philippines (UAAP). Although the men's basketball rivalry had died down after the 1990s, it returned in 2013 as both schools again met in the UAAP basketball championship series. The rivalry had also been apparent in women's volleyball where the two teams are frequent finalists in the UAAP volleyball championships and the Shakey's V-League.
