= UAAP Season 89 basketball tournaments =

Filipino collegiate basketball season

UAAP Season 89
- "For Everyone, UAAP"
- Host school: Far Eastern University

Men's tournament
- Semifinalists: NU Bulldogs; UP Fighting Maroons
JHS Finals	G1	Wins
NUNS Bullpups		0
		0
- Semifinalists: FEU–D Baby Tamaraws; Zobel Junior Archers; UE Junior Red Warriors

UAAP Season 89 basketball tournaments are the University Athletic Association of the Philippines (UAAP) basketball tournaments for its 89th season. Far Eastern University (FEU) are the season hosts, with the opening ceremony to be held at the SM Mall of Asia Arena on September 12, 2026.

The UAAP is expected to hold five tournaments: the men's and women's tournament in the collegiate division, and the under-16 boys' tournament in the high school division during the first semester, and the under-19 boys' and girls' tournament in the second semester.

== Tournament format ==
The UAAP is expected to use the UAAP Final Four format for tournaments with 7 teams or more. There are five tournaments in two divisions: the collegiate division tournaments and the 16-under tournament of the high school division are being held in the first semester of the academic year. Meanwhile, the 19-under boys' and 19-under girls' tournaments will be held in the second semester.

The under-19 girls' tournament, which only has 4 teams, will see the top two teams qualify to the best-of-three finals.

In order to accommodate UAAP players who are participating in 3x3 basketball at the 2026 Asian Games and the 2026 FIBA 3x3 U23 World Cup, only five (instead of the expected eight) game days will be held between September 13 to 30, 2026.

== Teams ==
Men's basketball is a mandatory event in the UAAP, where all 8 universities are required to field in teams. The 19-under girls' tournament is a demonstration sport and is not mandatory.

University	Men		Women		Uniform manufacturer
University	Team	Coach	Team	Coach	Uniform manufacturer
Adamson University (AdU)	Soaring Falcons	(Philippines) Nash Racela	Lady Falcons	(Philippines) Jed Colonia	Anta
Ateneo de Manila University (ADMU (Note: Since 2017, Ateneo de Manila University is the only member school that does not use an acronym for official communications and graphics, according to their branding guide. Third parties still routinely use the "ADMU" acronym to refer to Ateneo such as One Sports and the LaSallian.))	Blue Eagles	(Philippines) Louie Alas	Blue Eagles	(Philippines) PJ Navarro	Jordan Brand (Nike)
De La Salle University (DLSU)	Green Archers	(Philippines) Topex Robinson	Lady Archers	(Philippines) Pocholo Villanueva	Nike
Far Eastern University (FEU)	Tamaraws	(United States) Sean Chambers	Lady Tamaraws	(Philippines) Raiza Palmera-Dy	Puma (Men's); Jersey Haven (Women's)
National University (NU)	Bulldogs	(Philippines) Jeff Napa	Lady Bulldogs	(Philippines) D.A. Olan	Adidas
University of the East (UE)	Red Warriors	(Philippines) Paolo Hubalde	Lady Warriors	(Philippines) Ian Valdez	Logo Unlimited (Men's); Jersey Haven (Women's)
University of the Philippines (UP)	Fighting Maroons	(Philippines) Goldwin Monteverde	Fighting Maroons	(Philippines) Eric Altamirano	Puma (Men's); Titan 22 (Women's)
University of Santo Tomas (UST)	Growling Tigers	(Philippines) Pido Jarencio	Tigresses	(Philippines) Haydee Ong	Delta Sportswear (Men's); World Balance (Women's)

=== Coaching changes ===
Team	Outgoing coach	Manner of departure	Date	Replaced by	Date
UP Fighting Maroons (women)	(Philippines) Paul Ramos	Mutual consent	November 22, 2025	(Philippines) Eric Altamirano	March 4, 2026
Ateneo Blue Eagles (men)	(United States) Tab Baldwin	Resignation	June 15, 2026	(Philippines) Louie Alas (interim (Note: Alas was previously appointed as temporary coach on June 19, 2026.))	July 10, 2026
UE Red Warriors	(Philippines) Chris Gavina	Resignation	September 26, 2026	(Philippines) Paulo Hubalde (interim)	September 26, 2026

=== Ateneo's participation ===
On June 8, 2026, Ateneo Blue Eagles men's basketball players Divine Adili and Rene Baterbonia's deaths were announced by the Ateneo de Manila University. Ateneo announced that Adili, who had already played in the UAAP, and Baterbonia, a new recruit in the team, drowned in a team building activity off the waters of Dipaculao, Aurora.

Two days later, the UAAP issued a statement saying they "will go where the evidence leads" in response to the drownings. After their deaths, there was speculation on what the UAAP would do. Comparisons were made to UST's "Sorsogon bubble", La Salle's ineligiblity scandal, and Marlou Aquino's academic deficiencies but was still allowed to play by Adamson. UST's Aldin Ayo was (and still is) banned for life in the UAAP for "endangering the health and well-being of the student athletes under his charge", while both La Salle and Adamson were meted with one-season suspensions on all sports programs, not just basketball. Almost two weeks later, the UAAP announced that members of the Ateneo coaching staff that were present in Aurora were banned from joining any UAAP-sanctioned activities. Ateneo coach Tab Baldwin had earlier resigned as head coach.

On August 7, the UAAP announced the perpetual ban on Tab Baldwin and certain Ateneo men's basketball staff, but allowed Ateneo's teams to participate.

== Venues ==
Venues in Metro Manila

SM Mall of Asia Arena hosted the opening ceremonies. The Araneta Coliseum then hosted the actual opening games a day later, with it sharing the games with the SM Mall of Asia Arena, the PhilSports Arena, the Blue Eagle Gym and the Quadricentennial Pavilion.

The 16U tournament is played on member schools' gymnasiums.

Arena	Location	Tournament					Capacity
Arena	Location	M	W	B	G	16U	Capacity
Araneta Coliseum	Quezon City	check	check			check	14,429
Blue Eagle Gym (BEG)	Quezon City	check	check			check	7,500
DLSZ Sports Pavillon	Muntinlupa					check	
FEU Diliman Gym	Quezon City					check	
Gameville Central Park	Mandaluyong					check	
Lucio K. Tan Jr. Gym (UE)	Manila					check	
Ninoy Aquino Stadium (NAS)	Manila					check	6,000
Quadricentennial Pavilion (QPav)	Manila	check	check			check	5,792
SM Mall of Asia Arena (MOA)	Pasay	check	check			check	15,000
PhilSports Arena (ULTRA)	Pasig	check	check				10,000
St. Vincent Gymnasium (AdU)	Manila					check	

== Squads ==
Each team has a roster of up to 17 players. Only one "foreign student-athlete", non-Filipinos enrolled in the school and are otherwise known as "imports" elsewhere, is allowed to be used per game, but a maximum of two could be registered in the roster.

Starting this season, the UAAP will allow up to two imports in their pool, with still one allowed on the active roster, while another is available on the reserve list. The change is to provide teams with "roster security".

Men's squads
AdU	ADMU	DLSU	FEU	NU	UE	UP	UST
(Philippines) Mathew Montebon	(Philippines) Kieffer Alas	(Philippines) Earl Abadam	(Philippines) Jorick Bautista	(Philippines) Reinhard Jumamoy	(Philippines) Toper Lagat	(Philippines) Rey Remogat	(Philippines) Amiel Acido
(Philippines) Ray Allen Torres	(Philippines) Jared Bahay	(Philippines) Mason Amos	(Philippines) Kirby Mongcopa	(Philippines) PJ Palacielo	(Philippines) Cole Cruz-Dumont	(Philippines) Veejay Pre	(Philippines) Kirk Cañete
(Philippines) Earl Medina	(Philippines) Andrew Bongo	(Philippines) Jacob Cortez	(Philippines) Janrey Pasaol	(Philippines) Kenshin Padrones	(Philippines) Nurjadden Datumalim	(Philippines) LA Andres	(Philippines) Landyn Jumawan
(Philippines) AJ Fransman	(Philippines) Michael Asoro Jr.	(Philippines) Joaquin Tovera	(Philippines) Jedric Daa	(Philippines) Kurl Figueroa	(Philippines) Lance Sabroso	(Philippines) Sean Alter	(Philippines) Mark Llemit
(Philippines) Matty Erolon	(Philippines) Travis Roberts	(Philippines) Lebron Daep	(Philippines) Paolo Galvez	(Philippines) Dwyne Miranda	(Philippines) Dexter Santos	(Philippines) Jacob Bayla	(Philippines) Koji Buenaflor
(Philippines) Emmanuel Anabo	(Philippines) EJ Kapihe	(Philippines) Kyle Sardon	(Philippines) Elias Gish	(Philippines) Kurt Perciano	(Philippines) Darryl Robles	(Philippines) James Payosing	(Philippines) Andrew Chio
(Philippines) Hunter Cruz-Dumont	(Philippines) Matthew De Luna	(Philippines) Doy Dungo	(Philippines) Rojan Montemayor	(Philippines) Edson Serrano	(Philippines) Gene Carillo	(Philippines) Chicco Briones	(Philippines) Mur Alao
(Philippines) Joshua Barcelona	(Philippines) Ian Espinosa	(Philippines) Gian Gomez	(Philippines) Luke Felipe	(Philippines) Tebol Garcia	(Philippines) Colby Vazquez	(Philippines) Elliot Dimaculangan	(Philippines) Gelo Crisostomo
(Philippines) Kenji Cañete	(Philippines) Jay-M Leal	(Philippines) Mikey Cortez	(Philippines) Adam Nakai	(Philippines) Vince Reyes	(Philippines) Sigfrid Apostol	(Philippines) Rainer Maga	(Philippines) Ice Danting
(Philippines) Noah Pacquiao	(Philippines) Grayson Rogers	(Philippines) Vhoris Marasigan	(Philippines) Sam Hall	(Philippines) Carl Alfanta	(Philippines) Axlerose Javier	(Philippines) Arvie Poyos	(Philippines) Donovan Sevilla
(Philippines) Allen Perez	(Philippines) Chris Urbina	(Philippines) Ram Sharma	(Philippines) Yosef Rañeses	(Philippines) Paul Francisco	(Philippines) Johndrew Jimenez	(Philippines) Miguel Palanca	(Philippines) Jiro Sevilla
(Philippines) Jireh Tumaneng	(Philippines) Waki Espina	(Philippines) JC Macalalag	(Philippines) Alcen Macapagal	(Philippines) Chad Cartel	(Philippines) Bryle Mascariñas	(Philippines) Miguel Yniguez	(Philippines) Carl Manding
(Philippines) Kobe Demisana	(Philippines) Alden Cainglet	(Philippines) Luis Pablo	(Philippines) Stephen Cabigting	(Philippines) Jedric Solomon	(Philippines) Mariano Tañedo	(Philippines) Gani Stevens	(Philippines) Kris Porter
(Philippines) Mat Edding	(Philippines) Sam Reyes	(Philippines) Seven Gagate	(Philippines) Wil Cabonilas	(Philippines) Nat Tulabut	(Philippines) Kyle Perez	(Philippines) Russell Ogana	(Philippines) Charles Bucsit
(Philippines) Lance Mangaron	(Philippines) Shawn Tuano	(Philippines) Guillian Quines	(Philippines) Marc Burgos	(Philippines) Dennis Laconsay	(Philippines) Kean Dungca	(Philippines) Seann Franco	(Philippines) Charles Esteban
(Nigeria) Mudiaga Ojarikre	(Nigeria) Sultan Baruwa	(Nigeria) Henry Agunnane	(The Gambia) Mohamed Konateh	(Mali) Mo Diassana	(Ivory Coast) JM Edoukou	(Nigeria) Francis Nnoruka	(Nigeria) Collins Akowe
(Nigeria) Precious Jonah		(South Sudan) Moses Kulang	(United States) Montell Shelton		(Nigeria) Ola Ajani	(Nigeria) Dikachi Ududo	(Nigeria) Peter Osang

== Men's tournament ==
The men's tournament began on September 13, 2026, with the Adamson Soaring Falcons defeating the FEU Tamaraws.

=== Elimination round ===
The UE Red Warriors ended their 30-game losing streak on November 7, 2026 with a win against Adamson. It was UE's first win since October 26, 2024 (Season 87).

==== Team standings ====
Pos	Team	W	L	PCT	GB	Qualification
1	NU Bulldogs (T)	9	4	.692 (Note: Head-to-head record: NU 1–0 UP)	—	Twice-to-beat in the semifinals
2	UP Fighting Maroons (T)	9	4	.692	—	Twice-to-beat in the semifinals
3	FEU Tamaraws (H)	8	5	.615 (Note: Head-to-head record: FEU 1–0 La Salle)	1	Twice-to-win in the semifinals
4	De La Salle Green Archers	8	5	.615	1	Twice-to-win in the semifinals
5	UST Growling Tigers	7	6	.538	2	
6	Adamson Soaring Falcons (E)	5	8	.385 (Note: Head-to-head record: Adamson 1–1 Ateneo (Adamson +2))	4	
7	Ateneo Blue Eagles (E)	5	8	.385	4	
8	UE Red Warriors (E)	1	12	.077	8	

Updated to match(es) played on November 22, 2026. Source: Philippine Daily Inquirer
Rules for classification: 1) winning percentage; 2) if tied for #2 or #4, one-game playoff; 3) head-to-head record; 4) head-to-head point differential; 5) overall point differential:
(E) Eliminated; (H) Hosts; (T) Qualified, but not yet for the particular phase indicated

==== Match-up results ====
	Round 1							Round 2						
Team ╲ Game	1	2	3	4	5	6	7	8	9	10	11	12	13	14
Adamson	FEU school colors	Ateneo school colors	UST school colors	NU school colors	UE school colors	UP school colors	La Salle school colors	NU school colors	FEU school colors	UP school colors	UE school colors	Ateneo school colors	La Salle school colors	UST school colors
Ateneo	UE school colors	UP school colors	Adamson school colors	NU school colors	La Salle school colors	FEU school colors	UST school colors	FEU school colors	NU school colors	La Salle school colors	UP school colors	Adamson school colors	UST school colors	UE school colors
La Salle	NU school colors	UST school colors	FEU school colors	UE school colors	Ateneo school colors	UP school colors	Adamson school colors	UE school colors	UST school colors	Ateneo school colors	NU school colors	Adamson school colors	UP school colors	FEU school colors
FEU	Adamson school colors	UE school colors	La Salle school colors	UP school colors	Ateneo school colors	UST school colors	NU school colors	Ateneo school colors	Adamson school colors	UE school colors	UST school colors	UP school colors	NU school colors	La Salle school colors
NU	La Salle school colors	UE school colors	UP school colors	Ateneo school colors	Adamson school colors	UST school colors	FEU school colors	Adamson school colors	Ateneo school colors	UST school colors	La Salle school colors	UE school colors	FEU school colors	UP school colors
UE	Ateneo school colors	NU school colors	FEU school colors	UST school colors	La Salle school colors	Adamson school colors	UP school colors	La Salle school colors	UP school colors	FEU school colors	Adamson school colors	UST school colors	NU school colors	Ateneo school colors
UP	UST school colors	Ateneo school colors	NU school colors	FEU school colors	La Salle school colors	Adamson school colors	UE school colors	UST school colors	UE school colors	Adamson school colors	Ateneo school colors	FEU school colors	La Salle school colors	NU school colors
UST	UP school colors	La Salle school colors	UE school colors	Adamson school colors	NU school colors	FEU school colors	Ateneo school colors	UP school colors	La Salle school colors	NU school colors	FEU school colors	UE school colors	Ateneo school colors	Adamson school colors

Updated to match(es) played on November 22, 2026. Source: UAAP on Livestats
= Win; = OT win; = Loss; = OT loss

==== Scores ====
Results on top and to the right of the grey cells are for first-round games; those to the bottom and to the left are second-round games.

Teams	AdU	ADMU	DLSU	FEU	NU	UE	UP	UST
Adamson Soaring Falcons		68–73	63–60	56–53	66–85	71–64	67–69	85–57
Ateneo Blue Eagles	55–62		76–83	70–93	87–76	101–74	75–94	68–80
De La Salle Green Archers	84–69	76–73*		78–90	89–87	112–87	76–80	75–80
FEU Tamaraws	73–66	72–75			65–69	93–70	90–79	69–81
NU Bulldogs	79–43	65–69	84–80	63–85		76–56	72–64	87–85*
UE Red Warriors	53–47		88–97*	83–94	74–91		81–91	87–98
UP Fighting Maroons	82–70	82–74	80–88	68–71		101–70		92–85
UST Growling Tigers		89–84	80–92	86–85	71–75	97–70	101–103**	

Updated to match(es) played on November 22, 2026. Source: UAAP on Livestats
Legend: Blue = left column team win; Red = top row team win.
Matches with lighter background shading were decided after overtime.

=== Second seed playoff ===
The loser of the NU vs UP game, and the winner of the FEU vs. La Salle game will be tied with 9–5 records; this will require a one-game playoff to break the tie.

December 2, 2026

Team A	vs.	Team B

PhilSports Arena, Pasig

=== Bracket ===
Semifinals (Top 2 twice-to-beat)
1	*
4	*
2	^
3	^

Finals (Best-of-three playoff)
^
^

^If necessary

=== Semifinals ===
The top two teams have the twice-to-beat advantage in the semifinals, where they have to be beaten twice, while their opponents just once, to advance.

The UP Fighting Maroons become the first team to clinch a semifinal berth, with their win against Ateneo.. The NU Bulldogs became the second team to clinch a semifinal berth, after beating the UE Red Warriors.

==== #1 vs #4 ====
The winner of the NU vs. UP game, and the #4 seed will play in this match-up.

December 6, 2026

Team #1	vs.	Team #4

Araneta Coliseum, Quezon City

December 10, 2026

Team #1	vs.	Team #4

Araneta Coliseum, Quezon City

==== #2 vs #3 ====
The loser of the NU vs. UP game, and the winner of the FEU vs. La Salle game will play in this match-up.

December 6, 2026

Team #2	vs.	Team #3

Araneta Coliseum, Quezon City

December 10, 2026

Team #2	vs.	Team #3

Araneta Coliseum, Quezon City

=== Finals ===
The finals shall be a best-of-three playoff.

December 13, 2026

Higher-seeded team	vs.	Lower-seeded team

Araneta Coliseum, Quezon City

December 16, 2026

Higher-seeded team	vs.	Lower-seeded team

Araneta Coliseum, Quezon City

December 19, 2026

Higher-seeded team	vs.	Lower-seeded team

SM Mall of Asia Arena, Pasay

=== Awards ===
==== Players of the Week ====
The Collegiate Press Corps awards a "player of the week" throughout the season:

Week	Player	Team
Week 1	(Nigeria) Francis Nnoruka	UP Fighting Maroons
Week 2	(Philippines) Kirby Mongcopa	FEU Tamaraws
Week 3	(Philippines) Reinhard Jumamoy	NU Bulldogs
Week 4	(Philippines) Mark Llemit	UST Growling Tigers
Week 5	(Philippines) JC Macalalag	De La Salle Green Archers
Week 6	(Philippines) Joaquin Tovera	De La Salle Green Archers
Week 7	(Philippines) Toper Lagat	UE Red Warriors
Week 8	(Philippines) Amiel Acido	UST Growling Tigers

=== Discipline ===
The following were the issued suspensions for this season:

- Louie Alas, coach of the Ateneo Blue Eagles, for accumulating three infractions, two latest at their game against the De La Salle Green Archers, during the course of the tournament by then. He served his suspension against the FEU Tamaraws.
- John Dexter Santos of the UE Red Warriors, for committing a disqualifying foul against Dikachi Udodo of the UP Fighting Maroons. He served his suspension against the De La Salle Green Archers.
- Jay-M Leal of the Ateneo Blue Eagles, for two unsportsmanlike fouls, the second for elbowing Ice Danting of the UST Growling Tigers; the infraction was not called in-game but was upgraded to an unsportsmanlike foul after a post-game review by the commissioner's office. He served his suspension against the FEU Tamaraws.
- Louie Alas, coach of the Ateneo Blue Eagles, for his actions after their game against the UP Fighting Maroons. He served his 2-game suspension against the Adamson Soaring Falcons and the UST Growling Tigers.
- Shawn Tuano of the Ateneo Blue Eagles, for accumulating two infractions, the latest at their game against the UST Growling Tigers, during the course of the tournament by then. He will serve his suspension against the UE Red Warriors.

== Women's tournament ==
The women's tournament started on September 26, 2026, with the UST Growling Tigresses defeating the UE Lady Warriors.

=== Elimination round ===
The UE Lady Warriors ended their 31-game losing streak on October 28, 2026 after winning against the De La Salle Lady Archers. This marked UE's first win since September 22, 2024, coincidentally also against La Salle.

==== Team standings ====
Pos	Team	W	L	PCT	GB	Qualification
1	UST Growling Tigresses (Z)	13	0	1.000	—	Twice-to-beat in the semifinals
2	NU Lady Bulldogs	8	5	.615 (Note: Head-to-head record: NU 2–0 Adamson)	5	Twice-to-beat in the semifinals
3	Adamson Lady Falcons	8	5	.615	5	Twice-to-win in the semifinals
4	Ateneo Blue Eagles	6	6	.500 (Note: Head-to-head record: Ateneo 2–1, UP 2–2, FEU 1–2)	6.5	Twice-to-win in the semifinals
5	UP Fighting Maroons	6	6	.500	6.5	
6	FEU Lady Tamaraws (H)	6	6	.500	6.5	
7	De La Salle Lady Archers (E)	2	11	.154	11	
8	UE Lady Warriors (E)	1	11	.083	11.5	

Updated to match(es) played on November 22, 2026. Source: Philippine Daily Inquirer
Rules for classification: 1) winning percentage; 2) if tied for #2 or #4, one-game playoff; 3) head-to-head record; 4) head-to-head point differential; 5) overall point differential:
(E) Eliminated; (H) Hosts; (Z) Clinched twice-to-beat in the semifinals, can still clinch outright finals

==== Match-up results ====
	Round 1							Round 2						
Team ╲ Game	1	2	3	4	5	6	7	8	9	10	11	12	13	14
Adamson	NU school colors	UST school colors	UP school colors	UE school colors	La Salle school colors	Ateneo school colors	FEU school colors	FEU school colors	Ateneo school colors	UP school colors	UE school colors	NU school colors	La Salle school colors	UST school colors
Ateneo	UP school colors	NU school colors	La Salle school colors	FEU school colors	UST school colors	Adamson school colors	UE school colors	NU school colors	Adamson school colors	UP school colors	La Salle school colors	UST school colors	FEU school colors	UE school colors
La Salle	FEU school colors	UE school colors	Ateneo school colors	UP school colors	Adamson school colors	UST school colors	NU school colors	UE school colors	UST school colors	NU school colors	Ateneo school colors	Adamson school colors	UP school colors	FEU school colors
FEU	La Salle school colors	UP school colors	Ateneo school colors	UST school colors	NU school colors	UE school colors	Adamson school colors	Adamson school colors	NU school colors	UE school colors	UST school colors	UP school colors	Ateneo school colors	La Salle school colors
NU	Adamson school colors	Ateneo school colors	UST school colors	UE school colors	FEU school colors	UP school colors	La Salle school colors	Ateneo school colors	FEU school colors	La Salle school colors	Adamson school colors	UE school colors	UST school colors	UP school colors
UE	UST school colors	La Salle school colors	Adamson school colors	NU school colors	UP school colors	FEU school colors	Ateneo school colors	La Salle school colors	FEU school colors	Adamson school colors	UST school colors	NU school colors	UP school colors	Ateneo school colors
UP	Ateneo school colors	FEU school colors	Adamson school colors	La Salle school colors	UE school colors	NU school colors	UST school colors	UST school colors	Adamson school colors	Ateneo school colors	FEU school colors	La Salle school colors	UE school colors	NU school colors
UST	UE school colors	Adamson school colors	NU school colors	FEU school colors	Ateneo school colors	La Salle school colors	UP school colors	UP school colors	La Salle school colors	FEU school colors	UE school colors	Ateneo school colors	NU school colors	Adamson school colors

Updated to match(es) played on November 22, 2026. Source: UAAP on Livestats
= Win; = OT win; = Loss; = OT loss

==== Scores ====
Results on top and to the right of the grey cells are for first-round games; those to the bottom and to the left are second-round games.

Teams	AdU	ADMU	DLSU	FEU	NU	UE	UP	UST
Adamson Lady Falcons		79–70	70–68	48–50	51–71	67–50	67–60	65–83
Ateneo Blue Eagles	70–52		79–66	88–66	77–87	73–56	82–89	67–90
De La Salle Lady Archers	57–76	83–85		71–76	71–75	70–55	58–63	62–83
FEU Lady Tamaraws	75–79				60–66	73–53	74–67*	42–88
NU Lady Bulldogs	84–77	84–60	83–84	81–85		76–63	71–82	66–90
UE Lady Warriors	77–94		68–65	63–81	40–94		43–57	58–103
UP Fighting Maroons	59–66	64–76	92–74	82–80				66–75
UST Growling Tigresses		87–80	97–74	95–48	92–80	106–48	93–65	

Updated to match(es) played on November 22, 2026. Source: UAAP on Livestats
Legend: Blue = left column team win; Red = top row team win.
Matches with lighter background shading were decided after overtime.

=== Semifinals ===
If no team wins all elimination round games, the top two teams have the twice-to-beat advantage in the semifinals, where they have to be beaten twice, while their opponents just once, to advance.

If a team wins all elimination round games, the third and fourth ranked teams play in the first round of the single-elimination stepladder playoffs, with the second ranked team awaiting in the second round.

=== Finals ===
The finals shall be a best-of-three playoff.

=== Awards ===
==== Players of the Week ====
The Collegiate Press Corps awards a "player of the week" throughout the season.

The women's tournament started almost a full two weeks after the men's tournament. The first winner was named a week after the men's tournament.

Week	Player	Team
Week 2	(Philippines) Cielo Pagdulagan	NU Lady Bulldogs
Week 3	(Philippines) Kacey dela Rosa	Ateneo Blue Eagles
Week 4	(Philippines) Karylle Sierba	UST Growling Tigresses
Week 5	(Australia) Erinn McAlary	UST Growling Tigresses
Week 6	(Philippines) Sy Oñate	UE Lady Warriors
Week 7	(Nigeria) Bukky Ojo	De La Salle Lady Archers
Week 8	(Philippines) Bridgette Santos	UST Growling Tigresses

=== Discipline ===
The following were the issued suspensions for this season:

- Paul Du, assistant coach of the NU Lady Bulldogs, for elbowing UST assistant coach Arsenio Dysangco in the post-game handshakes. Du was suspended for the rest of the season, beginning at their first round game against UE Lady Warriors.
- Haydee Ong, coach of the UST Growling Tigresses, for accumulating three infractions during the course of the tournament by then. She served her suspension against the FEU Lady Tamaraws.

== 16U tournament ==
The 16U tournament started on August 15, 2026.

The games scheduled for August 29 and September 5 were postponed by the UAAP after the city governments of Manila and Quezon City postponed classes due to inclement weather.

=== Elimination round ===
==== Team standings ====
Pos	Team	W	L	PCT	GB	Qualification
1	NUNS Bullpups	14	0	1.000	—	Advance to the Finals (Note: As NUNS won all of their elimination round games, the stepladder format was used instead of the regular Final Four format.)
2	FEU–D Baby Tamaraws (H)	11	3	.786	3	Advance to stepladder semifinal
3	Zobel Junior Archers	9	5	.643	5	Proceed to stepladder quarterfinal
4	UE Junior Red Warriors	8	6	.571	6	Proceed to stepladder quarterfinal
5	UST Tiger Cubs	7	7	.500	7	
6	Adamson Baby Falcons	3	11	.214	11	
7	Ateneo Blue Eagles	2	12	.143 (Note: Head-to-head record: Ateneo 1–1 UPIS (Ateneo +17))	12	
8	UPIS Junior Fighting Maroons	2	12	.143	12	

Rules for classification: 1) winning percentage; 2) if tied for #2 or #4, one-game playoff; 3) head-to-head record; 4) head-to-head point differential; 5) overall point differential:
(H) Hosts

==== Match-up results ====
	Round 1							Round 2						
Team ╲ Game	1	2	3	4	5	6	7	8	9	10	11	12	13	14
Adamson	FEU school colors	La Salle school colors	Ateneo school colors	UP school colors	UST school colors	NU school colors	UE school colors	UE school colors	UST school colors	La Salle school colors	NU school colors	UP school colors	FEU school colors	Ateneo school colors
Ateneo	La Salle school colors	FEU school colors	Adamson school colors	UST school colors	UE school colors	UP school colors	NU school colors	FEU school colors	UP school colors	UST school colors	UE school colors	La Salle school colors	NU school colors	Adamson school colors
DLSZ	Ateneo school colors	Adamson school colors	NU school colors	FEU school colors	UP school colors	UE school colors	UST school colors	FEU school colors	UP school colors	UE school colors	Adamson school colors	Ateneo school colors	UST school colors	NU school colors
FEU–D	Adamson school colors	Ateneo school colors	La Salle school colors	UE school colors	NU school colors	UST school colors	UP school colors	La Salle school colors	Ateneo school colors	UST school colors	UP school colors	NU school colors	Adamson school colors	UE school colors
NUNS	UST school colors	UE school colors	La Salle school colors	UP school colors	FEU school colors	Adamson school colors	Ateneo school colors	UE school colors	UST school colors	UP school colors	Adamson school colors	FEU school colors	Ateneo school colors	La Salle school colors
UE	UP school colors	NU school colors	UST school colors	FEU school colors	Ateneo school colors	La Salle school colors	Adamson school colors	NU school colors	Adamson school colors	La Salle school colors	Ateneo school colors	UST school colors	UP school colors	FEU school colors
UPIS	UE school colors	UST school colors	NU school colors	Adamson school colors	La Salle school colors	Ateneo school colors	FEU school colors	La Salle school colors	Ateneo school colors	NU school colors	FEU school colors	Adamson school colors	UE school colors	UST school colors
UST	NU school colors	UP school colors	UE school colors	Ateneo school colors	Adamson school colors	FEU school colors	La Salle school colors	NU school colors	Adamson school colors	Ateneo school colors	FEU school colors	UE school colors	La Salle school colors	UP school colors

Updated to match(es) played on November 17, 2026. Source: UAAP on Livestats
= Win; = OT win; = Loss; = OT loss

==== Scores ====
Results on top and to the right of the grey cells are for first-round games; those to the bottom and to the left are second-round games.

Teams	AdU	ADMU	DLSZ	FEU	NU	UE	UPIS	UST
Adamson Baby Falcons		78–56	69–86	60–84	73–107	74–99	69–76	76–82
Ateneo Blue Eagles	79–70		83–101	55–77	71–114	76–84	61–64	78–90
Zobel Junior Archers	90–60	84–55		76–86	88–92	77–69	86–57	91–81
FEU–D Baby Tamaraws	90–66	77–34	82–76		68–85	65–83	95–51	77–69
NUNS Bullpups	96–57	85–70	86–56	75–67		83–79	100–45	100–75
UE Junior Red Warriors	80–84	105–83	80–89	67–84	90–95		91–66	94–81
UPIS Junior Fighting Maroons	83–99	80–100	64–79	30–98	42–87	67–96		77–86
UST Tiger Cubs	112–56	84–79	98–91	60–67	75–86	87–96	71–61	

Updated to match(es) played on November 17, 2026. Source: UAAP on Livestats
Legend: Blue = left column team win; Red = top row team win.
Matches with lighter background shading were decided after overtime.

=== Bracket ===
Stepladder quarterfinal (Single-elimination)
3	DLSZ
4	UE

Stepladder semifinal (Single-elimination)
2	FEU–D

Finals (Best-of-three playoff)
1	NUNS	^
^

^If necessary

=== Stepladder playoffs ===
If a team wins all elimination round games, the third and fourth ranked teams play in the first round of the single-elimination stepladder playoffs, with the second ranked team awaiting in the semifinal.

===== (3) DLSZ vs. (4) UE =====
DLSZ and UE will play in the quarterfinal.

November 25, 2026
8:00 a.m.

Zobel Junior Archers	vs.	UE Junior Red Warriors

SM Mall of Asia Arena, Pasay

===== (2) FEU vs. quarterfinal winner =====
FEU awaits in the semifinal the winner of the quarterfinal.

November 28, 2026
8:00 a.m.

FEU–D Baby Tamaraws	vs.	Quarterfinal winner

Araneta Coliseum, Quezon City

=== Finals ===
The finals shall be a best-of-three playoff.

The NUNS Bullpups clinched a finals berth with a 14–0 elimination round sweep. This was coincidentally their 30th consecutive win, dating from UAAP Season 88.

December 2, 2026

NUNS Bullpups	vs.	Semifinal winner

PhilSports Arena, Pasig

December 6, 2026

NUNS Bullpups	vs.	Semifinal winner

Araneta Coliseum, Quezon City

December 13, 2026

NUNS Bullpups	vs.	Semifinal winner

SM Mall of Asia Arena, Pasay

=== Discipline ===
The following were the issued suspensions for this season:

- Hyram Bagatsing, coach of the Zobel Junior Archers, for accumulating three infractions during the course of the tournament by then. He will serve his suspension against the UE Junior Warriors.

== See also ==
- NCAA Season 102 basketball tournaments
