= UAAP Season 86 basketball tournaments =

Basketball season

UAAP Season 86
- "Fueling the Future"
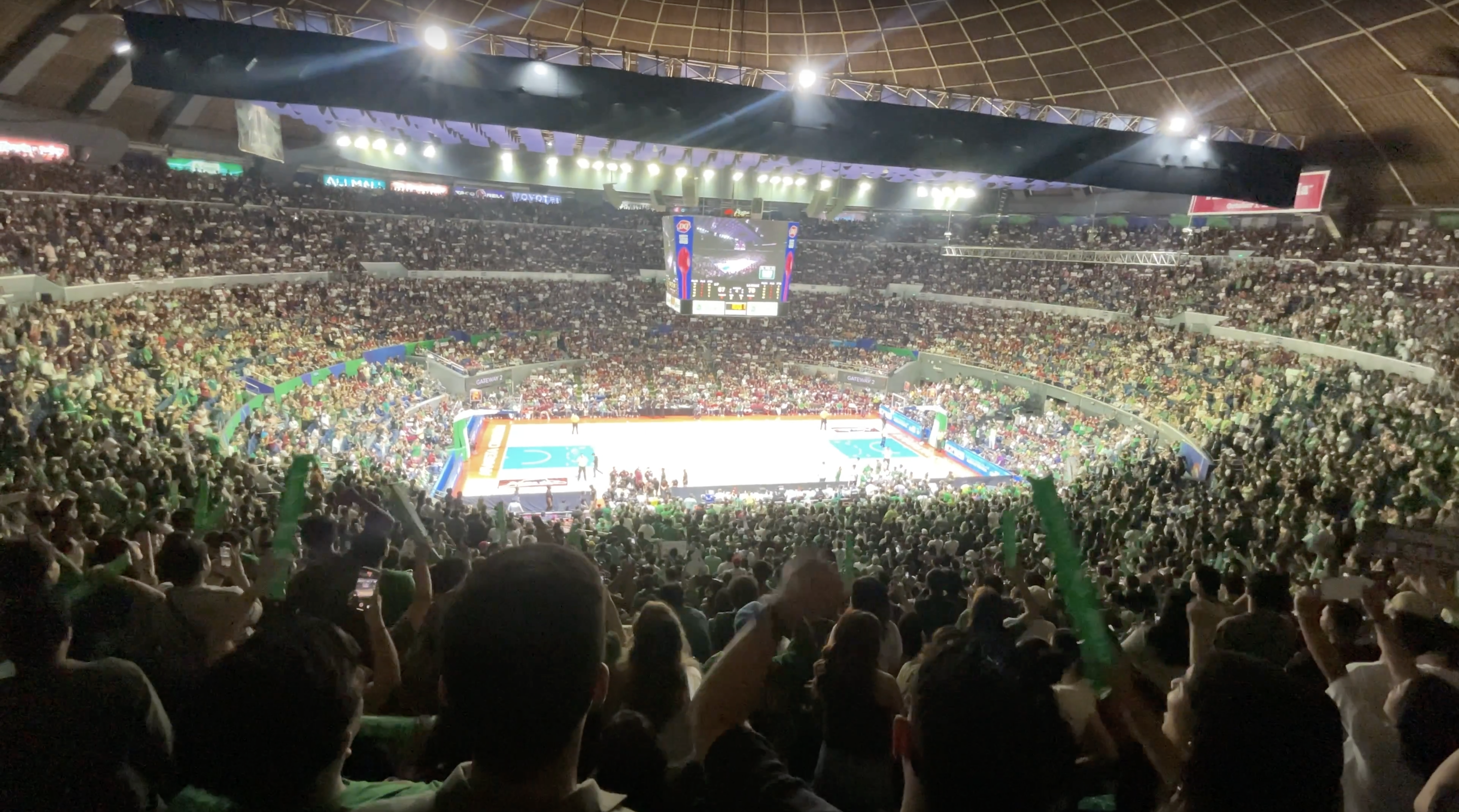
- Game 3 of the men's finals between La Salle and UP
- Host school: University of the East (Collegiate division); De La Salle Santiago Zobel School (High School division)
Men's Finals	G1	G2	G3	Wins
UP Fighting Maroons	97	60	69	1
De La Salle Green Archers	67	82	73	2
- Duration: November 29 – December 6, 2023
- Arena(s): SM Mall of Asia Arena (Game 1); Araneta Coliseum (Games 2 and 3)
- Finals MVP: Kevin Quiambao
- Winning coach: Topex Robinson (1st title)
- Semifinalists: NU Bulldogs; Ateneo Blue Eagles
- TV network(s): One Sports; UAAP Varsity Channel
Women's Finals	G1	G2	G3	Wins
NU Lady Bulldogs	72	72	69	1
UST Growling Tigresses	76	70	71	2
- Duration: November 29 – December 6, 2023
- Arena(s): SM Mall of Asia Arena (Game 1); Araneta Coliseum (Games 2 and 3)
- Finals MVP: Tantoy Ferrer
- Winning coach: Haydee Ong (1st title)
- Semifinalists: UP Fighting Maroons; Ateneo Blue Eagles
- TV network(s): One Sports; UAAP Varsity Channel
Juniors' Finals	G1	G2	G3	Wins
Adamson Baby Falcons	77	64	90	2
NUNS Bullpups	71	67	73	1
- Duration: February 4–11, 2024
- Arena(s): Filoil EcoOil Centre
- Finals MVP: Mark Esperanza
- Winning coach: Mike Fermin (1st title)
- Semifinalists: FEU–D Baby Tamaraws; UST Tiger Cubs
- TV network(s): One Sports; UAAP Varsity Channel

The UAAP Season 86 basketball tournaments are the University Athletic Association of the Philippines (UAAP) basketball tournaments for the 2023–24 school year. The University of the East are the hosts.

The collegiate tournaments began on September 30, 2023, while the high school boys' tournament commenced on November 21, 2023.

In the men's tournament, the UP Fighting Maroons finished the elimination round in first place. Defending champions Ateneo Blue Eagles finished tied for fourth with the Adamson Soaring Falcons, and eliminated the latter in a playoff. UP then defeated Ateneo in the semifinals. In the other semifinal match-up, #2 seed De La Salle Green Archers eliminated the NU Bulldogs. The Green Archers then defeated the UP in the finals, 2 games to one.

In the women's tournament, the 7-time defending champions NU Lady Bulldogs finished first after the elimination round, and eliminated the Ateneo Blue Eagles in the semifinals. The UST Tigresses finished second, and faced the UP Fighting Maroons in the other semifinal, a match-up that needed all two games to be finished. The Tigresses then defeated the Lady Bulldogs in the finals, 2 games to one.

In the boys' tournament, the Adamson Baby Falcons finished first, ahead of the NUNS Bullpups. Adamson eliminated the UST Tiger Cubs in the semifinals, while the Bullpups eliminated the defending champions FEU Diliman Baby Tamaraws. In the finals, the Baby Falcons won their ninth UAAP title after defeating NUNS in 3 games.

== Tournament format ==
The UAAP continued to use the UAAP Final Four format.

The league announced that it shall allow players who have played with a special guest license from the Games and Amusements Board to participate in its tournaments, except for licenses where the player participated in the Philippine Basketball Association.

Xavy Nunag reprised his role as commissioner from Season 85. Assisting him are Mariana Lopa, deputy commissioner for women's and girls' basketball, and Marvin Bienvenida, deputy commissioner for boys' basketball. Nunag took a leave of absence on mid-November, citing a health crisis within his family. Lopa was named acting commissioner during his absence.

Starting Season 86, teams customarily assigned to wear light jerseys during certain games would be allowed to wear dark uniforms instead as long as Commissioner's Office permits. However this privilege was not exercised.

== Teams ==
Basketball is a mandatory event in the UAAP, where all 8 universities are required to field in teams.

The girls' tournament is a demonstration sport last held in 2020, and is not mandatory.

Collegiate division
University	Men		Women		Uniform manufacturer
University	Team	Coach	Team	Coach	Uniform manufacturer
Adamson University (AdU)	Soaring Falcons	(Philippines) Nash Racela	Lady Falcons	(Philippines) Ryan Monteclaro	Anta
Ateneo de Manila University (ADMU)	Blue Eagles	(United States) Tab Baldwin	Blue Eagles	(Philippines) LA Mumar	Jordan Brand (Nike)
De La Salle University (DLSU)	Green Archers	(Philippines) Topex Robinson	Lady Archers	(Philippines) Pocholo Villanueva	Nike
Far Eastern University (FEU)	Tamaraws	(Philippines) Denok Miranda	Lady Tamaraws	(Philippines) Bert Flores	Puma
National University (NU)	Bulldogs	(Philippines) Jeff Napa	Lady Bulldogs	(Philippines) Aries Dimaunahan	
University of the East (UE)	Red Warriors	(Philippines) Jack Santiago	Lady Warriors	(Philippines) Aileen Lebornio	Anta
University of the Philippines (UP)	Fighting Maroons	(Philippines) Goldwin Monteverde	Fighting Maroons	(Philippines) Paul Ramos	STATS (Men's); Titan 22 (Women's)
University of Santo Tomas (UST)	Growling Tigers	(Philippines) Pido Jarencio	Tigresses	(Philippines) Haydee Ong	Delta Sportswear

High school division
High schools	Team	Coach
Adamson University (AdU)	Baby Falcons	(Philippines) Mike Fermin
Ateneo de Manila University High School (ADMU)	Blue Eagles	(Philippines) Reggie Varilla
De La Salle Santiago Zobel School (DLSZ)	Junior Archers	(Philippines) Boris Aldeguer
Far Eastern University Diliman (FEU-D)	Baby Tamaraws	(Philippines) Allan Albano
National University Nazareth School (NUNS)	Bullpups	(Philippines) Kevin De Castro
University of the East (UE)	Junior Warriors	(Philippines) Karl Santos
University of the Philippines Integrated School (UPIS)	Junior Fighting Maroons	(Philippines) Paolo Mendoza
University of Santo Tomas Senior High School (UST)	Tiger Cubs	(Philippines) Manu Iñigo

=== Coaching changes ===
Team	Outgoing coach	Manner of departure	Date	Replaced by	Date
FEU Tamaraws	(Philippines) Olsen Racela	Resignation	December 22, 2022	(Philippines) Denok Miranda	January 18, 2023
De La Salle Green Archers	(Philippines) Derrick Pumaren	End of contract	December 27, 2022	(Philippines) Topex Robinson	January 19, 2023
UST Growling Tigers	(Philippines) Bal David	Resignation	January 26, 2023	(Philippines) Pido Jarencio	February 3, 2023
Adamson Lady Falcons	(Philippines) Brian Gorospe	End of interim spell	February 27, 2023	(Philippines) Ryan Monteclaro	February 27, 2023

== Venues ==
Venues in Metro Manila.

The men's tournament will be primarily held at the SM Mall of Asia Arena in Pasay. The Araneta Coliseum in Quezon City will host a quadruple header, and the Quadricentennial Pavilion in Manila shall host a doubleheader. For the women's tournament. the SM Mall of Asia Arena and Quadricentennial Pavilion will host the games.

The Adamson Gym in Manila will host also quadruple headers for the women's tournament.

For the boys' tournament, Amoranto Sports Complex in Quezon City hosted opening day, with succeeding games scheduled to be held at Adamson Gym, Quadicentennial Pavilion, SM Mall of Asia Arena and the Araneta Coliseum. The Filoil EcoOil Centre in San Juan hosted all second round games.

For the junior high school tournament, all participating schools shall take turns in hosting the tournament.

Arena	Location	Tournament			Capacity
Arena	Location	M	W	B	Capacity
Amoranto Sports Complex	Quezon City			check	
Araneta Coliseum	Quezon City	check	check	check	14,429
Filoil EcoOil Centre	San Juan			check	6,000
Quadricentennial Pavilion (UST Gym)	Manila	check	check	check	5,792
SM Mall of Asia Arena	Pasay	check	check	check	15,000
St. Vincent Gym (Adamson Gym)	Manila		check	check	

== Squads ==
Each team has a 16-player roster. Only one "foreign student-athlete", non-Filipinos who are otherwise known as "imports" elsewhere, is allowed to be on the active roster.

=== Men's tournament ===
Adamson	Ateneo	De La Salle	FEU	NU	UE	UP	UST
Emman Anabo	Kai Ballungay	EJ Abadam	Royce Alforque	Kean Baclaan	Josiah Alcantara	Gerry Abadiano	Nic Cabanero
Mario Barasi	Andrew Bongo	Cyrus Austria	Cholo Anonuevo	LA Casinillo	Mark Joseph Cabero	Harold Alarcon	Ivanne Calum
Joshua Barcelona	Jared Brown	Raven Cortez	Aeron Bagunu	Drex delos Reyes	Jack Cruz-Dumont	Sean Alter	Mark Crisostomo
Jhon Calisay	Raffy Celis	Joshua David	Jorick Bautista	Steve Nash Enriquez	Devin Fykes	Mark Belmonte	Kenji Duremdes
Kenji Canete	Geo Chiu	Francis Escandor	Angelo Beato	Jake Figueroa	Ethan Galang	Lowell Chan	Adrian Esmenia
Jed Colonia	Jason Credo	EJ Gollena	Leyton Buenaventura	Joemaiko Gulapa	Ryzel Guillena	Joel Cagulangan	Adama Faye
Matty Erolon	Mason Dulieu-Amos	JC Macalalag	Lorenzo Competente	John Martin Galinato	MJ Langit	CJ Cansino	Jonathan Gesalem
Didat Hanapi	Ian Espinosa	Joaqui Manuel	Mouhamed Faty	Omar John	Vlair Lingolingo	Malick Diouf	Ivan Lazarte
Jerom Lastimosa	Kyle Gamber	Evan Nelle	Luke Felipe	Reinhard Jumamoy	Ray Allen Maglupay	Ernest Felicilda	Echo Laure
Vince Magbuhos	Vince Gomez	Mark Nonoy	LJ Gonzales	Donn Lim	Matthew Manalang	Terrence Fortea	Mark Llemit
Cedrick Manzano	Chris Koon	Bright Nwanko	Alcen Macapagal	Michael Malonzo	Precious Momowei	Seven Gagate	Kyle Magdangal
Mathew Montebon	Joshua Lazaro	Ben Phillips	Rojan Montemayor	Jolo Manansala	Rey Remogat	Cyril Gonzales	Paul Manalang
Mudiaga Akpofure Ojarikre	LeBron Nieto	Isiah Phillips	Miguel Ona	Kenshin Padrones	Abdul Sawat	Francis Lopez	Christian Manaytay
Eli Ramos	Joseph Obasa	Mike Phillips	Patrick Sleat	Justin Palacielo	Keian Spandonis	Luis Pablo	SJ Moore
Joem Sabandal	Anton Quitevis	Jonnel Policarpio	James Tempra	Bobby Mark Parks	Miguel Tulabut	Sean Torculas	Miguel Pangilinan
Joshua Yerro	Shawn Tuano	Kevin Quiambao	Xyrus Torres	Patrick Wilson Yu	Gjerard Wilson	Reyland Torres	Vincent Ventulan

=== Foreign student-athletes ===
Every university had one foreigner in both tournaments in the college division.

College division
University	Men's tournament		Women's tournament	
University	Name	Nationality	Name	Nationality
Adamson	Mudiaga Ojarikre	Nigeria	Victoria Adeshina	Nigeria
Ateneo	Joseph Obasa	Nigeria	Sarah Makanjuola	Nigeria
La Salle	Bright Nwankwo	Nigeria	Aji Bojang	Zambia
FEU	Mo Faty	Senegal	Josee Kaputu	Congo
NU	Omar John	Senegal	Jainaba Konateh	Gambia
UE	Precious Momowei	Senegal	Kamba Kone	Mali
UP	Malick Diouf	Senegal	Favour Onoh	Nigeria
UST	Adama Faye	Senegal	Awa Ly	Senegal

Only NUNS has a foreigner on its roster in the boys' tournament.

High school division
High school	Boys' tournament	
High school	Name	Nationality
NUNS	Collins Akowe	Cameroon

== Men's tournament ==
=== Elimination round ===
==== Team standings ====
Pos	Team	W	L	PCT	GB	Qualification
1	UP Fighting Maroons	12	2	.857	—	Twice-to-beat in the semifinals
2	De La Salle Green Archers	11	3	.786	1	Twice-to-beat in the semifinals
3	NU Bulldogs	10	4	.714	2	Twice-to-win in the semifinals
4	Ateneo Blue Eagles	7	7	.500 (Note: Fourth seed playoff: Ateneo 70–48 Adamson)	5	Twice-to-win in the semifinals
5	Adamson Soaring Falcons	7	7	.500	5	
6	UE Red Warriors (H)	4	10	.286	8	
7	FEU Tamaraws	3	11	.214	9	
8	UST Growling Tigers	2	12	.143	10	

Source: UAAP on Livestats
Rules for classification: 1) winning percentage; 2) if tied for #2 or #4, one-game playoff; 3) head-to-head record; 4) head-to-head point differential; 5) overall point differential
(H) Hosts

==== Match-up results ====
	Round 1							Round 2						
Team ╲ Game	1	2	3	4	5	6	7	8	9	10	11	12	13	14
Adamson	UP school colors	UST school colors	Ateneo school colors	La Salle school colors	UE school colors	FEU school colors	NU school colors	UP school colors	FEU school colors	UST school colors	La Salle school colors	Ateneo school colors	NU school colors	UE school colors
Ateneo	NU school colors	La Salle school colors	Adamson school colors	UE school colors	FEU school colors	UST school colors	UP school colors	FEU school colors	UP school colors	NU school colors	UST school colors	Adamson school colors	UE school colors	La Salle school colors
La Salle	FEU school colors	Ateneo school colors	UST school colors	Adamson school colors	NU school colors	UP school colors	UE school colors	UST school colors	NU school colors	UP school colors	Adamson school colors	UE school colors	FEU school colors	Ateneo school colors
FEU	La Salle school colors	NU school colors	UE school colors	UP school colors	Ateneo school colors	Adamson school colors	UST school colors	Ateneo school colors	Adamson school colors	UE school colors	NU school colors	UP school colors	La Salle school colors	UST school colors
NU	Ateneo school colors	FEU school colors	UP school colors	UST school colors	La Salle school colors	UE school colors	Adamson school colors	UE school colors	La Salle school colors	Ateneo school colors	FEU school colors	UST school colors	Adamson school colors	UP school colors
UE	UST school colors	UP school colors	FEU school colors	Ateneo school colors	Adamson school colors	NU school colors	La Salle school colors	NU school colors	UST school colors	FEU school colors	UP school colors	La Salle school colors	Ateneo school colors	Adamson school colors
UP	Adamson school colors	UE school colors	NU school colors	FEU school colors	UST school colors	La Salle school colors	Ateneo school colors	Adamson school colors	Ateneo school colors	La Salle school colors	UE school colors	FEU school colors	UST school colors	NU school colors
UST	UE school colors	Adamson school colors	La Salle school colors	NU school colors	UP school colors	Ateneo school colors	FEU school colors	La Salle school colors	UE school colors	Adamson school colors	Ateneo school colors	NU school colors	UP school colors	FEU school colors

Source: UAAP on Livestats
= Win; = OT win; = Loss; = OT loss

==== Scores ====
Results on top and to the right of the grey cells are for first-round games; those to the bottom and to the left of it are second-round games.

Teams	AdU	ADMU	DLSU	FEU	NU	UE	UP	UST
Adamson Soaring Falcons		74–71*	58–71	46–49	66–69	72–65	51–68	79–76*
Ateneo Blue Eagles	62–58		77–72	61–66*	64–77	76–69	99–89*	97–77
De La Salle Green Archers	69–57	72–69		87–76	77–80*	83–75	64–67	91–71
FEU Tamaraws	54–63	62–59	70–80		65–71	58–65	76–80*	62–68
NU Bulldogs	62–68	65–61	78–88	68–57		68–49	60–78	87–69
UE Red Warriors	61–63	74–80	76–86	87–86*	61–64		69–84	80–70
UP Fighting Maroons	77–51	65–60	79–88	81–64	79–57	79–72		110–79
UST Growling Tigers	53–61	59–67	69–100	57–53	65–76	73–86	61–86	

Source: UAAP on Livestats
Legend: Blue = left column team win; Red = top row team win.
Matches with lighter background shading were decided after overtime.

=== Fourth seed playoff ===
Ateneo and Adamson finished the elimination round tied for fourth. This was a one-game playoff to determine the #4 seed.

One Sports, UAAP Varsity Channel

November 22, 2023
2:00 p.m.

Box score

Ateneo Blue Eagles	70–48	Adamson Soaring Falcons
Scoring by quarter: 24–16, 16–10, 16–13, 14-9
Pts: Jared Brown 20; Rebs: Joseph Obasa 16; Asts: 3 players, 4 each		Pts: Matt Erolon 9 Rebs: Ced Manzano 6 Asts: Jed Colonia 3
Ateneo advances to the Final Four

SM Mall of Asia Arena, Pasay
Attendance: 7,088

=== Bracket ===
Semifinals (Top 2 twice-to-beat)
1	UP	57
4	Ateneo	46
2	La Salle	97
3	NU	73

Finals (Best-of-three playoff)
1	UP	97	60	69
2	La Salle	67	82	73

=== Semifinals ===
UP and La Salle has the twice-to-beat advantage which means they have to win only once, and their opponents twice in the semifinals to advance to the Finals.

==== (1) UP vs. (4) Ateneo ====
This was the first Battle of Katipunan, so called after the street that rans in between Ateneo's and UP's campuses in Quezon City, in the semifinals of UAAP men's basketball. The UP Fighting Maroons clinched their first-ever #1 seed of the league, with fifth consecutive Final Four appearance and fourth consecutive tournament's twice-to-beat advantage. Ateneo was in its ninth straight Final Four appearance, and also the first time that they are the #4 seed. This is also rematch of three of the last four UAAP men's basketball Finals.

One Sports
UAAP Varsity Channel

November 25, 2023
2:00 p.m.

Box score

UP Fighting Maroons	57–46	Ateneo Blue Eagles
Scoring by quarter: 7–11, 15–14, 20–12, 15–9
Pts: Diouf, Lopez 12; Rebs: Malick Diouf 16; Asts: Felicilda, Cagulangan 3		Pts: Chris Koon 10; Rebs: Joseph Obasa 10; Asts: Sean Quitevis 3
UP wins series in one game

Araneta Coliseum, Quezon City
Attendance: 14,505

==== (2) La Salle vs. (3) NU ====
The last time La Salle and NU faced each other in the Final Four was in 2001. The De La Salle Green Archers returned to the semifinals with the twice-to-beat advantage after missing out last season. NU qualified for their second consecutive postseason appearance.

One Sports
UAAP Varsity Channel

November 25, 2023
6:00 p.m.

Box score

De La Salle Green Archers	97–73	NU Bulldogs
Scoring by quarter: 20–14, 25–22, 25–14, 27–23
Pts: Mark Nonoy 20; Rebs: Michael Phillips 10; Asts: Evan Nelle 8		Pts: Jake Figueroa 19; Rebs: Jake Figueroa 9 Asts: Kean Baclaan 6
La Salle wins series in one game

Araneta Coliseum, Quezon City
Attendance: 12,254

=== Finals ===
The Finals is a best-of-three playoff.

UP was on its third straight Finals appearance, and fourth in the last five seasons, while La Salle entered its 17th Finals appearance, their first since 2017. This will also be the first time that the Fighting Maroons and the Green Archers face each other in the championship round.

One Sports
UAAP Varsity Channel

November 29, 2023
6:00 p.m.

Box score

UP Fighting Maroons	97–67	De La Salle Green Archers
Scoring by quarter: 28–24, 25–17, 24–14, 20–12
Pts: Harold Alarcon 21; Rebs: Malick Diouf 15; Asts: Cagulangan, Felicilda 3		Pts: Michael Phillips 19; Rebs: Michael Phillips 9 Asts: Kevin Quiambao 3

SM Mall of Asia Arena, Pasay
Attendance: 17,129

One Sports
UAAP Varsity Channel

December 3, 2023
4:00 p.m.

Box score

UP Fighting Maroons	60–82	De La Salle Green Archers
Scoring by quarter: 27–24, 11–20, 11–21, 11–17
Pts: Cansino, Diouf 11; Rebs: Francis Lopez 13; Asts: JD Cagulangan 3		Pts: Francis Escandor 14; Rebs: Quiambao, M. Phillips 13; Asts: Evan Nelle 10

Araneta Coliseum, Quezon City
Attendance: 20,863

One Sports
UAAP Varsity Channel

December 6, 2023
6:00 p.m.

Box score

UP Fighting Maroons	69–73	De La Salle Green Archers
Scoring by quarter: 21–22, 22–17, 15–16, 11–18
Pts: Malick Diouf 21; Rebs: Malick Diouf 14; Asts: Janjan Felicilda 5		Pts: Kevin Quiambao 24; Rebs: Michael Phillips 16; Asts: Evan Nelle 7
La Salle wins series, 2–1

Araneta Coliseum, Quezon City
Attendance: 25,192

- Finals Most Valuable Player: Kevin Quiambao (De La Salle Green Archers)

=== Awards ===
UAAP Season 86 men's basketball champions
De La Salle Green Archers
Tenth title

The awards were handed out prior to Game 2 of the Finals at the Araneta Coliseum.

- Most Valuable Player: Kevin Quiambao (De La Salle Green Archers)
- Rookie of the Year: Francis Lopez (UP Fighting Maroons)
- Mythical Five:
  - Kevin Quiambao (De La Salle Green Archers)
  - Rey Remogat (UE Red Warriors)
  - Evan Nelle (De La Salle Green Archers)
  - Malick Diouf (UP Fighting Maroons)
  - LJ Gonzales (FEU Tamaraws)

==== Players of the Week ====
The Collegiate Press Corps awards a "player of the week" on Tuesdays for performances on the preceding week.

Week	Player	Team
Week 1	(Senegal) Malick Diouf	UP Fighting Maroons
Week 2	(Philippines) Jake Figueroa	NU Bulldogs
Week 3	(Philippines) Mason Amos	Ateneo Blue Eagles
Week 4	(Philippines) Kevin Quiambao	De La Salle Green Archers
Week 5	none awarded	
Week 6	(Philippines) Kevin Quiambao	De La Salle Green Archers
Week 7	(Philippines) Mathew Montebon	Adamson Soaring Falcons

=== Statistical leaders ===
==== Statistical points leaders ====
#	Player	Team	SP
1	(Philippines) Kevin Quiambao	De La Salle Green Archers	97.0
2	(Philippines) Rey Remogat	UE Red Warriors	85.929
3	(Philippines) Evan Nelle	De La Salle Green Archers	77.536
4	(Senegal) Malick Diouf	UP Fighting Maroons	74.769
5	(Philippines) LJ Gonzales	FEU Tamaraws	66.857

==== Season player highs ====
Statistic	Player	Team	Average
Points per game	(Philippines) Nic Cabanero	UST Growling Tigers	16.79
Rebounds per game	(Senegal) Precious Momowei	UE Red Warriors	13.92
Assists per game	(Philippines) Rey Remogat	UE Red Warriors	7.86
Steals per game	(Philippines) Evan Nelle	De La Salle Green Archers	2.0
Blocks per game	(Nigeria) Joseph Obasa	Ateneo Blue Eagles	3.21
Field goal percentage	(Senegal) Malick Diouf	UP Fighting Maroons	58.72%
Three-point field goal percentage	(Philippines) Raven Cortez	De La Salle Green Archers	66.0%
Free throw percentage	(Philippines) Rey Remogat	UE Red Warriors	88.0%
Turnovers per game	(Philippines) Rey Remogat	UE Red Warriors	3.93

==== Game player highs ====
Statistic	Player	Team	Total	Opponent
Points	(Philippines) Rey Remogat	UE Red Warriors	34 (Note: Game went into overtime)	FEU Tamaraws
Points	(Philippines) Rey Remogat	UE Red Warriors	27	Adamson Soaring Falcons
Rebounds	(Senegal) Precious Momowei	UE Red Warriors	22	UP Fighting Maroons
Assists	(Philippines) Kevin Quiambao	De La Salle Green Archers	14	NU Bulldogs
Steals	(Philippines) Rey Remogat	UE Red Warriors	8	NU Bulldogs
Blocks	(Nigeria) Joseph Obasa	Ateneo Blue Eagles	6	UE Red Warriors
Turnovers	(Philippines) Rey Remogat	UE Red Warriors	8	FEU Tamaraws
Turnovers	(Philippines) Nic Cabanero	UST Growling Tigers	8	De La Salle Green Archers

==== Season team highs ====
Category	Team	Average
Points per game	De La Salle Green Archers	80.57
Rebounds per game	De La Salle Green Archers	47.93
Assists per game	De La Salle Green Archers	22.86
Steals per game	UP Fighting Maroons	9.86
Blocks per game	UP Fighting Maroons	4.71
Field goal percentage	NU Bulldogs	42.94%
Three point field goal percentage	UE Red Warriors	31.65%
Free throw percentage	Ateneo Blue Eagles	66.18%
Turnovers per game	FEU Tamaraws	14.07

==== Game team highs ====
Statistic	Team	Total	Opponent
Points	UP Fighting Maroons	110	UST Growling Tigers
Rebounds	Ateneo Blue Eagles	66	De La Salle Green Archers
Assists	De La Salle Green Archers	31	UE Red Warriors
Steals	UP Fighting Maroons	15	NU Bulldogs
Steals	UE Red Warriors	15	NU Bulldogs
Steals	UP Fighting Maroons	15	UST Growling Tigers
Blocks	Adamson Soaring Falcons	9	UST Growling Tigers
Field goal percentage	NU Bulldogs	56.0%	Adamson Soaring Falcons
Three-point field goal percentage	Ateneo Blue Eagles	52.0%	UST Growling Tigers
Free throw percentage	FEU Tamaraws	92%	UP Fighting Maroons
Turnovers	UST Growling Tigers	24	UP Fighting Maroons

=== Discipline ===
The following were suspended throughout the course of the season:

- CJ Austria of the De La Salle Green Archers for a disqualifying foul against the UST Growling Tigers. Served a one-game suspension against the Adamson Soaring Falcons.
- Referees Allan Dasal, Allan Baria, and Dennis Escaros were suspended for three weeks for "failure to enforce the rules of the game" and conduct "disruptive to the integrity of the game" on the first round games between UP vs. FEU, La Salle vs. Adamson, and Ateneo vs. UE. All three referees also failed their respective referee game report cards.
- Precious Momowei of the UE Red Warriors for a second unsportsmanlike foul in the season on their game against the De La Salle Green Archers. Will serve a one-game suspension against the Ateneo Blue Eagles.

== Women's tournament ==
=== Elimination round ===
==== Team standings ====
Pos	Team	W	L	PCT	GB	Qualification
1	NU Lady Bulldogs	13	1	.929	—	Twice-to-beat in the semifinals
2	UST Growling Tigresses	11	3	.786	2	Twice-to-beat in the semifinals
3	UP Fighting Maroons	10	4	.714	3	Twice-to-win in the semifinals
4	Ateneo Blue Eagles	8	6	.571	5	Twice-to-win in the semifinals
5	De La Salle Lady Archers	7	7	.500	6	
6	Adamson Lady Falcons	4	10	.286	9	
7	FEU Lady Tamaraws	3	11	.214	10	
8	UE Lady Warriors (H)	0	14	.000	13	

Source: UAAP on Livestats
Rules for classification: 1) winning percentage; 2) if tied for #2 or #4, one-game playoff; 3) head-to-head record; 4) head-to-head point differential; 5) overall point differential
(H) Hosts

==== Match-up results ====
	Round 1							Round 2						
Team ╲ Game	1	2	3	4	5	6	7	8	9	10	11	12	13	14
Adamson	UP school colors	UST school colors	Ateneo school colors	La Salle school colors	UE school colors	FEU school colors	NU school colors	La Salle school colors	UP school colors	UE school colors	Ateneo school colors	UST school colors	NU school colors	FEU school colors
Ateneo	NU school colors	La Salle school colors	Adamson school colors	UE school colors	FEU school colors	UST school colors	UP school colors	NU school colors	UE school colors	UP school colors	Adamson school colors	FEU school colors	La Salle school colors	UST school colors
La Salle	FEU school colors	Ateneo school colors	UST school colors	Adamson school colors	NU school colors	UP school colors	UE school colors	Adamson school colors	UST school colors	FEU school colors	NU school colors	UP school colors	Ateneo school colors	UE school colors
FEU	La Salle school colors	NU school colors	UE school colors	UP school colors	Ateneo school colors	Adamson school colors	UST school colors	UE school colors	NU school colors	La Salle school colors	UP school colors	Ateneo school colors	UST school colors	Adamson school colors
NU	Ateneo school colors	FEU school colors	UP school colors	UST school colors	La Salle school colors	UE school colors	Adamson school colors	Ateneo school colors	FEU school colors	UST school colors	La Salle school colors	UE school colors	Adamson school colors	UP school colors
UE	UST school colors	UP school colors	FEU school colors	Ateneo school colors	Adamson school colors	NU school colors	La Salle school colors	FEU school colors	Ateneo school colors	Adamson school colors	UST school colors	NU school colors	UP school colors	La Salle school colors
UP	Adamson school colors	UE school colors	NU school colors	FEU school colors	UST school colors	La Salle school colors	Ateneo school colors	UST school colors	Adamson school colors	Ateneo school colors	FEU school colors	La Salle school colors	UE school colors	NU school colors
UST	UE school colors	Adamson school colors	La Salle school colors	NU school colors	UP school colors	Ateneo school colors	FEU school colors	UP school colors	La Salle school colors	NU school colors	UE school colors	Adamson school colors	FEU school colors	Ateneo school colors

Source: UAAP on Livestats
= Win; = OT win; = Loss; = OT loss

==== Scores ====
Results on top and to the right of the grey cells are for first-round games; those to the bottom and to the left of it are second-round games.

Teams	AdU	ADMU	DLSU	FEU	NU	UE	UP	UST
Adamson Lady Falcons		59–69	55–63	71–50	65–95	71–41	61–92	65–84
Ateneo Blue Eagles	69–61		87–80*	72–64	57–77	72–62	85–76	67–90
De La Salle Lady Archers	68–57	67–61		68–75	53–91	80–62	61–65	57–91
FEU Lady Tamaraws	60–71	66–79	70–73**		58–95	63–53	61–64	66–82
NU Lady Bulldogs	76–61	84–74	73–64	76–55		72–50	69–72	76–64
UE Lady Warriors	66–71	66–81	45–58	47–64	57–75		48–66	46–63
UP Fighting Maroons	57–45	71–48	71–75	70–55	59–81	70–55		73–69*
UST Tigresses	76–70	80–68	93–67	106–85	76–77*	103–54	74–72	

Source: UAAP on Livestats
Legend: Blue = left column team win; Red = top row team win.
Matches with lighter background shading were decided after overtime.

=== Bracket ===
Semifinals (Top 2 twice-to-beat)
1	NU	58
4	Ateneo	43
2	UST	80	87
3	UP	88	83

Finals (Best-of-three playoff)
1	NU	72	72	69
2	UST	76	70	71

=== Semifinals ===
The top 2 teams have the twice-to-beat advantage over their opponents, where they only have to win once, or be beaten twice by their opponents, to progress.

==== (1) NU vs. (4) Ateneo ====
NU clinched the #1 seed and the twice-to-beat advantage, while the Ateneo the #4 seed and qualified to the playoffs.

One Sports
UAAP Varsity Channel

November 22, 2023
9:00 a.m.

Box scores

NU Lady Bulldogs	58–43	Ateneo Blue Eagles
Scoring by quarter: 13–11, 18–16, 17–10, 10–6
Pts: Camille Clarin 12; Rebs: Gypsy Canuto 9 Asts: Camille Clarin 4		Pts: Junize Calago 12; Rebs: Sarah Makanjuola 16; Asts: Calago, Joson 3
NU wins series in one game

SM Mall of Asia Arena, Pasay

==== (2) UST vs. (3) UP ====
This series involved UST and UP, with the former holding the twice-to-beat advantage.

One Sports
UAAP Varsity Channel

November 22, 2023
11:00 a.m.

Box score

UST Growling Tigresses	80–88 (OT)	UP Fighting Maroons
Scoring by quarter: 22–21, 23–17, 9–21, 18–13, Overtime: 8–16
Pts: Jane Pastrana 29; Rebs: Jane Pastrana 11; Asts: Brigette Santos 6		Pts: Louna Ozar 25; Rebs: Favour Onoh 30; Asts: Onoh, Bariquit 4

SM Mall of Asia Arena, Pasay

One Sports
UAAP Varsity Channel

November 25, 2023
11:00 a.m.

Box score

UST Growling Tigresses	87–83	UP Fighting Maroons
Scoring by quarter: 36–27, 20–20, 18–19, 13–17
Pts: Kent Pastrana 18; Rebs: Tantoy Ferrer 12; Asts: Tantoy Ferrer 7		Pts: Favour Onoh 21; Rebs: Favour Onoh 14; Asts: Christie Bariquit 6
UST wins series in two games

Araneta Coliseum, Quezon City

=== Finals ===
The Finals is a best-of-three playoff.

The NU Lady Bulldogs enter their ninth consecutive Finals appearance hoping to defend their 7-peat title, while the UST Tigresses make a return appearance since 2019, where these two teams also last met each other in the championship round.

One Sports
UAAP Varsity Channel

November 29, 2023
12:00 p.m.

Box score

NU Lady Bulldogs	72–76	UST Growling Tigresses
Scoring by quarter: 12–20, 19–16, 20–18, 21–22
Pts: Camille Clarin 18; Rebs: Angelica Surada 11; Asts: Camille Clarin 6		Pts: Kent Pastrana 15; Rebs: Tantoy Ferrer 14; Asts: Tantoy Ferrer 5

SM Mall of Asia Arena, Pasay

One Sports
UAAP Varsity Channel

December 3, 2023
12:00 p.m.

Box score

NU Lady Bulldogs	72–70	UST Growling Tigresses
Scoring by quarter: 21– 26, 19–17, 19–14, 13–13
Pts: Camille Clarin 18; Rebs: Surada, Berberabe 10; Asts: Camille Clarin 8		Pts: 3 players, 15; Rebs: Rocel Dionisio 8 Asts: Brigette Santos 7

Araneta Coliseum, Quezon City

One Sports
UAAP Varsity Channel

December 6, 2023
12:00 p.m.

Box score

NU Lady Bulldogs	69–71	UST Growling Tigresses
Scoring by quarter: 19–19, 25–13, 17–25, 8–25
Pts: Kristine Cayabyab 18; Rebs: Angelica Surada 12; Asts: Gypsy Canuto 4		Pts: Tantoy Ferrer 19; Rebs: Tantoy Ferrer 14; Asts: Rocel Dionisio
UST wins series, 2–1

Araneta Coliseum, Quezon City

- Finals Most Valuable Player: Tantoy Ferrer (UST Growling Tigresses)

=== Awards ===
UAAP Season 86 women's basketball champions
UST Growling Tigresses
12th title

The awards were handed out prior to Game 2 of the Finals at the Araneta Coliseum.

- Most Valuable Player: Kacey Dela Rosa (Ateneo Blue Eagles)
- Rookie of the Year: Favour Onoh (UP Fighting Maroons)
- Mythical Five:
  - Kacey Dela Rosa (Ateneo Blue Eagles)
  - Josee Kaputo (FEU Lady Tamaraws)
  - Kent Pastrana (UST Growling Tigresses)
  - Junize Calago (Ateneo Blue Eagles)
  - Tantoy Ferrer (UST Growling Tigresses)

==== Players of the Week ====
The Collegiate Press Corps awards a "player of the week" on Tuesdays for performances from the preceding week.

Week	Player	Team
Week 1	(Nigeria) Favour Onoh	UP Fighting Maroons
Week 2	(Philippines) Louna Ozar	UP Fighting Maroons
Week 3	(Philippines) Kent Pastrana	UST Growling Tigresses
Week 4	(Philippines) Tantoy Ferrer	UST Growling Tigresses
Week 6	(The Gambia) Jainaba Konateh	NU Lady Bulldogs
Week 7	(Philippines) Nikki Villasin	UST Growling Tigresses

- Note: No winner was named for week 5.

=== Statistical leaders ===
==== Statistical points leaders ====
#	Player	Team	SP
1	(Philippines) Kacey dela Rosa	Ateneo Blue Eagles	83.857
2	(Republic of the Congo) Josee Kaputu	FEU Lady Tamaraws	82.0
3	(Philippines) Jane Pastrana	UST Growling Tigresses	77.714
4	(Nigeria) Favour Onoh	UP Fighting Maroons	72.714
5	(Philippines) Junize Calago	Ateneo Blue Eagles	70.714

==== Season player highs ====
Statistic	Player	Team	Average
Points per game	(Republic of the Congo) Josee Kaputu	FEU Lady Tamaraws	21.93
Rebounds per game	(Republic of the Congo) Josee Kaputu	FEU Lady Tamaraws	14.5
Assists per game	(Philippines) Jhazmin Jhoson	Ateneo Blue Eagles	7.86
Steals per game	(Philippines) Stefanie Berberabe	NU Lady Bulldogs	2.0
Blocks per game	(Nigeria) Favour Onoh	UP Fighting Maroons	3.21
Field goal percentage	(Philippines) Karl Pingol	NU Lady Bulldogs	54.21%
Three-point field goal percentage	(Philippines) Agatha Bron	UST Growling Tigresses	40.0%
Free throw percentage	(Philippines) Karl Pingol	NU Lady Bulldogs	82.05%
Turnovers per game	(Philippines) Shane Salvani	FEU Lady Tamaraws	5.36

==== Game player highs ====
Statistic	Player	Team	Total	Opponent
Points	(Republic of the Congo) Josee Kaputo	FEU Lady Tamaraws	37	UST Growling Tigresses
Rebounds	(Nigeria) Favour Onoh	UP Fighting Maroons	24	De La Salle Lady Archers
Assists	(Philippines) Jhazmin Jhoson	Ateneo Blue Eagles	12	UE Lady Warriors
Steals	(Philippines) Arabela dela Rosa	UE Lady Warriors	7	Ateneo Blue Eagles
Steals	(Philippines) Angelika Soriano	UST Growling Tigresses	7	UP Fighting Maroons
Blocks	(Nigeria) Favour Onoh	UP Fighting Maroons	6	NU Lady Bulldogs
Turnovers	(Philippines) Paulina Anastacio	UE Red Warriors	14	UP Fighting Maroons

==== Season team highs ====
Category	Team	Average
Points per game	UST Growling Tigresses	82.21
Rebounds per game	Ateneo Blue Eagles	54.07
Assists per game	NU Lady Bulldogs	21.57
Steals per game	UST Growling Tigresses	16.5
Blocks per game	Ateneo Blue Eagles	5.14
Field goal percentage	NU Lady Bulldogs	47.12%
Three point field goal percentage	UST Growling Tigresses	28.48%
Free throw percentage	Ateneo Blue Eagles	56.06%
Turnovers per game	UST Growling Tigresses	20.5

==== Game team highs ====
Statistic	Team	Total	Opponent
Points	UST Growling Tigresses	106	FEU Lady Tamaraws
Rebounds	De La Salle Lady Archers	72	UE Lady Warriors
Assists	NU Lady Bulldogs	30	De La Salle Lady Archers
Steals	UP Fighting Maroons	23	Ateneo Blue Eagles
Blocks	Ateneo Blue Eagles	10	De La Salle Lady Archers
Blocks	Ateneo Blue Eagles	10	UE Lady Warriors
Field goal percentage	UST Growling Tigresses	52.0%	FEU Lady Tamaraws
Three-point field goal percentage	Ateneo Blue Eagles	52.0%	UP Fighting Maroons
Free throw percentage	NU Lady Bulldogs	100%	Adamson Lady Falcons
Turnovers	Ateneo Blue Eagles	38	UP Fighting Maroons

== Boys' tournament ==
The boys' tournament began on November 21, 2023.

=== Elimination round ===
==== Team standings ====
Pos	Team	W	L	PCT	GB	Qualification
1	Adamson Baby Falcons	13	1	.929	—	Twice-to-beat in the semifinals
2	NUNS Bullpups	11	3	.786	2	Twice-to-beat in the semifinals
3	FEU–D Baby Tamaraws	9	5	.643	4	Twice-to-win in the semifinals
4	UST Tiger Cubs	8	6	.571	5	Twice-to-win in the semifinals
5	UE Junior Red Warriors (H)	6	8	.429	7	
6	Zobel Junior Archers	4	10	.286 (Note: Head-to-head record: DLSZ 1–1 Ateneo (DLSZ +9))	9	
7	Ateneo Blue Eagles	4	10	.286	9	
8	UPIS Junior Fighting Maroons	1	13	.071	12	

Source: UAAP on Livestats
Rules for classification: 1) winning percentage; 2) if tied for No. 2 or 4, one-game playoff; 3) head-to-head record; 4) head-to-head point differential; 5) overall point differential
(H) Hosts

==== Match-up results ====
	Round 1							Round 2						
Team ╲ Game	1	2	3	4	5	6	7	8	9	10	11	12	13	14
Adamson	UST school colors	Ateneo school colors	NU school colors	UE school colors	La Salle school colors	UP school colors	FEU school colors	UST school colors	UE school colors	FEU school colors	Ateneo school colors	La Salle school colors	UP school colors	NU school colors
Ateneo	UP school colors	Adamson school colors	UE school colors	NU school colors	FEU school colors	UST school colors	La Salle school colors	UP school colors	NU school colors	La Salle school colors	Adamson school colors	FEU school colors	UST school colors	UE school colors
DLSZ	UE school colors	FEU school colors	UP school colors	UST school colors	Adamson school colors	NU school colors	Ateneo school colors	UE school colors	UST school colors	Ateneo school colors	NU school colors	Adamson school colors	FEU school colors	UP school colors
FEU–D	NU school colors	La Salle school colors	UST school colors	UP school colors	Ateneo school colors	UE school colors	Adamson school colors	NU school colors	UP school colors	Adamson school colors	UE school colors	Ateneo school colors	La Salle school colors	UST school colors
NUNS	FEU school colors	UE school colors	Adamson school colors	Ateneo school colors	UP school colors	La Salle school colors	UST school colors	FEU school colors	Ateneo school colors	UST school colors	La Salle school colors	UP school colors	UE school colors	Adamson school colors
UE	La Salle school colors	NU school colors	Ateneo school colors	Adamson school colors	UST school colors	FEU school colors	UP school colors	La Salle school colors	Adamson school colors	UP school colors	FEU school colors	UST school colors	NU school colors	Ateneo school colors
UPIS	Ateneo school colors	UST school colors	La Salle school colors	FEU school colors	NU school colors	Adamson school colors	UE school colors	Ateneo school colors	FEU school colors	UE school colors	NU school colors	UST school colors	Adamson school colors	La Salle school colors
UST	Adamson school colors	UP school colors	FEU school colors	La Salle school colors	UE school colors	Ateneo school colors	NU school colors	Adamson school colors	La Salle school colors	NU school colors	UP school colors	UE school colors	Ateneo school colors	FEU school colors

Source: UAAP on Livestats
= Win; = OT win; = Loss; = OT loss

==== Scores ====
Results on top and to the right of the grey cells are for first-round games; those to the bottom and to the left of it are second-round games.

Teams	AdU	ADMU	DLSZ	FEU-D	NUNS	UE	UPIS	UST
Adamson Baby Falcons		81–64	83–70	68–57	63–59	66–51	103–72	95–81
Ateneo Blue Eagles	74–87		71–67	68–70	73–81	70–73	93–86	74–59
DLSZ Junior Archers	59–74	92–79		72–76	53–99	79–76	100–76	62–75
FEU-D Baby Tamaraws	66–76	67–65	86–64		56–70	66–58	84–82	81–82
NUNS Bullpups	75–87	62–61	70–61	82–70*		78–61	84–76	78–85
UE Junior Warriors	54–78	77–61	84–78	62–66	52–67		93–77	80–64
UPIS Junior Fighting Maroons	62–77	55–70	64–75	61–87	65–90	80–71		84–90
UST Tiger Cubs	67–64	80–68	78–66	78–84	75–85	73–76	93–64	

Source: UAAP on Livestats
Legend: Blue = left column team win; Red = top row team win.
Matches with lighter background shading were decided after overtime.

=== Bracket ===
Semifinals (Top 2 twice-to-beat)
1	Adamson	80
4	UST	66
2	NUNS	80
3	FEU–D	69

Finals (Best-of-three playoff)
1	Adamson	77	64	90
2	NUNS	71	67	73

=== Semifinals ===
Both Adamson and NUNS clinched the twice-to-beat advantage, while both FEU Diliman and UST settled for the twice-to-win disadvantage.

==== (1) Adamson vs. (4) UST ====
One Sports
UAAP Varsity Channel

January 31, 2024
2:00 p.m.

Adamson Baby Falcons	80–66	UST Tiger Cubs
Scoring by quarter: 23–17, 14–10, 24–23, 19–16
Pts: Vince Reyes 23; Rebs: Reyes, Bonzalida 11; Asts: Mark Esperanza 8		Pts: Wacky Ludovice 19; Rebs: Carl Manding 8 Asts: JB Lim 5
Adamson wins series in one game

Filoil EcoOil Centre, San Juan

==== (2) NUNS vs. (3) FEU Diliman ====
One Sports
UAAP Varsity Channel

January 31, 2024
4:00 p.m.

NUNS Bullpups	80–69	FEU–D Baby Tamaraws
Scoring by quarter: 26–16, 21–24, 14–12, 19–17
Pts: Collins Akowe 24; Rebs: Collins Akowe 14; Asts: Akowe, Reroma 5		Pts: Veejay Pre 23; Rebs: Pre, Miller 10; Asts: Dwyne Miranda 10
NUNS wins series in one game

Filoil EcoOil Centre, San Juan

=== Finals ===
The finals will be a best-of-three playoff.

One Sports
UAAP Varsity Channel

February 4, 2024
4:00 p.m.

Adamson Baby Falcons	77–71	NUNS Bullpups
Scoring by quarter: 16–13, 21–26, 14–20, 26–12
Pts: Vince Reyes 17; Rebs: Vince Reyes 6 Asts: Tebol Garcia 7		Pts: Collins Akowe 26; Rebs: Akowe, Alfanta 11; Asts: Akowe, Cartel 4

Filoil EcoOil Centre, San Juan

One Sports
UAAP Varsity Channel

February 7, 2024
4:00 p.m.

Adamson Baby Falcons	64–67	NUNS Bullpups
Scoring by quarter: 17–14, 21–18, 15–22, 11–13
Pts: Earl Medina 23; Rebs: Garcia, Reyes 5 Asts: Tebol Garcia 6		Pts: Tagotongan, Akowe 16; Rebs: Collins Akowe 13; Asts: Mac-Mac Alfanta 5

Filoil EcoOil Centre, San Juan

One Sports
UAAP Varsity Channel

February 11, 2024
4:00 p.m.

Adamson Baby Falcons	90–73	NUNS Bullpups
Scoring by quarter: 24–15, 19–17, 19–21, 28–20
Pts: Bonzalida, Garcia 15; Rebs: JC Bonzalida 10; Asts: 3 players, 4		Pts: Collins Akowe 18; Rebs: Collins Akowe 13; Asts: Klein Tagotongan 5
Adamson wins series, 2–1

Filoil EcoOil Centre, San Juan

- Finals Most Valuable Player: Mark Esperanza (Adamson Baby Falcons)

=== Awards ===
UAAP Season 86 juniors' basketball champions
Adamson Baby Falcons
Ninth title

The awards were handed out prior to Game 2 of the Finals at the Filoil EcoOil Centre.

- Most Valuable Player: Collins Akowe (NUNS Bullpups)
- Rookie of the Year: Nathan Egea (UPIS Junior Fighting Maroons)
- Mythical Five:
  - Collins Akowe (NUNS Bullpups)
  - Kieffer Alas (Zobel Junior Archers)
  - Kristian Porter (Ateneo Blue Eagles)
  - Andrei Dungo (UST Tiger Cubs)
  - Tebol Garcia (Adamson Baby Falcons)

==== Statistical points leaders ====
#	Player	Team	SP
1	(Cameroon) Collins Akowe	NUNS Bullpups	96.714
2	(Philippines) Kieffer Alas	Zobel Junior Archers	89.727
3	(Philippines) Kris Porter	Ateneo Blue Eagles	85.786
4	(Philippines) Andrei Dungo	UST Tiger Cubs	81.286
5	(Philippines) Tebol Garcia	Adamson Baby Falcons	81.286

==== Season player highs ====
Statistic	Player	Team	Average
Points per game	(Philippines) Kieffer Alas	Zobel Junior Archers	20.36
Rebounds per game	(Cameroon) Collins Akowe	NUNS Bullpups	21.07
Assists per game	(Philippines) Kieffer Alas	Zobel Junior Archers	5.27
Steals per game	(Philippines) JB Lim	UST Tiger Cubs	3.38
Blocks per game	(Cameroon) Collins Akowe	NUNS Bullpups	2.21
Field goal percentage	(Cameroon) Collins Akowe	NUNS Bullpups	58.39%
Three-point field goal percentage	(Cameroon) Collins Akowe	NUNS Bullpups	58.75%
Free throw percentage	(Philippines) Wacky Ludovice	UST Tiger Cubs	95.24%
Turnovers per game	(Philippines) Lans Lagdamen	Ateneo Blue Eagles	3.46

==== Game player highs ====
Statistic	Player	Team	Total	Opponent
Points	(Philippines) Kris Porter	Ateneo Blue Eagles	34	Adamson Baby Falcons
Rebounds	(Cameroon) Collins Akowe	NUNS Bullpups	29	UPIS Junior Fighting Maroons
Assists	(Philippines) Kieffer Alas	Zobel Junior Archers	13	UPIS Junior Fighting Maroons
Steals	(Philippines) JB Lim	UST Tiger Cubs	8	Zobel Junior Archers
Blocks	(Cameroon) Collins Akowe	NUNS Bullpups	6	Adamson Baby Falcons
Turnovers	(Philippines) Nathan Egea	UPIS Junior Fighting Maroons	14	UST Tiger Cubs

==== Season team highs ====
Category	Team	Average
Points per game	Adamson Baby Falcons	78.71
Rebounds per game	NUNS Bullpups	55.86
Assists per game	Adamson Baby Falcons	23.14
Steals per game	UST Tiger Cubs	11.5
Blocks per game	NUNS Bullpups	5.14
Field goal percentage	Adamson Baby Falcons	45.41%
Three point field goal percentage	Adamson Baby Falcons	32.66%
Free throw percentage	NUNS Bullpups	59.28%
Turnovers per game	UPIS Junior Fighting Maroons	13.64

==== Game team highs ====
Statistic	Team	Total	Opponent
Points	Adamson Baby Falcons	103	UPIS Junior Fighting Maroons
Rebounds	NUNS Bullpups	77	UPIS Junior Fighting Maroons
Assists	Adamson Baby Falcons	33	UPIS Junior Fighting Maroons
Steals	Zobel Junior Archers	18	Ateneo Blue Eagles
Steals	Adamson Baby Falcons	18	UE Junior Red Warriors
Blocks	NUNS Bullpups	10	FEU–D Baby Tamaraws
Field goal percentage	NUNS Bullpups	56.0%	Zobel Junior Archers
Three-point field goal percentage	UST Tiger Cubs	45.0%	UPIS Junior Fighting Maroons
Free throw percentage	FEU–D Baby Tamaraws	88.0%	UST Tiger Cubs
Turnovers	Ateneo Blue Eagles	29	Zobel Junior Archers

== Junior high school tournament ==
A demonstration event for junior high school students, boys under 16 years old was inaugurated. Each UAAP member school will take turns in hosting games.

== Overall championship points ==
Pts.	Ranking
15	Champion
12	2nd
10	3rd
8	4th
6	5th
4	6th
2	7th
1	8th
—	Did not join
WD	Withdrew

=== Collegiate division ===
Rank	Team	Men	Women	Total
1st	NU	10	12	22
1st	UP	12	10	22
3rd	La Salle	15	6	21
4th	UST	1	15	16
4th	Ateneo	8	8	16
6th	Adamson	6	4	12
7th	UE	4	1	5
8th	FEU	2	2	4

=== High school division ===
Rank	Team	Total
1st	Adamson	15
2nd	NUNS	12
3rd	FEU–D	10
4th	UST	8
5th	UE	6
6th	DLSZ	4
7th	Ateneo	2
8th	UPIS	1

In case of a tie, the team with the higher position in any tournament is ranked higher. If both are still tied, they are listed by alphabetical order.

How rankings are determined:

- Ranks fifth to eighth determined by elimination round standings.
- Semifinal losers ranked by elimination round standings.
  - If stepladder: Loser of stepladder semifinals round 1 is ranked fourth
  - If stepladder: Loser of stepladder semifinals round 2 is ranked third
- Loser of the finals is ranked second
- Champion is ranked first

== See also ==
- NCAA Season 99 basketball tournaments
