= 2025–26 Oklahoma State Cowgirls basketball team =

American college basketball season

2025–26 Oklahoma State Cowgirls basketball

NCAA tournament, Second Round
- Conference: Big 12 Conference
- Record: 24–10 (12–6 Big 12)
- Head coach: Jacie Hoyt (4th season)
- Assistant coaches: Kelby Jones; Mandi Carver; Ashley Davis; Robyne Bostick; Terran Hoyt
- Home arena: Gallagher-Iba Arena

2025–26 Big 12 women's basketball standings
| | Conf. | | | | Overall |
| Team | W | | L | PCT | W | | L | PCT |
|---|---|---|---|---|---|---|---|---|
| No. 6 TCU | 15 | – | 3 | .833 | 32 | – | 6 | .842 |
| No. 18 West Virginia † | 14 | – | 4 | .778 | 28 | – | 7 | .800 |
| No. 23 Baylor | 13 | – | 5 | .722 | 25 | – | 9 | .735 |
| Oklahoma State | 12 | – | 6 | .667 | 24 | – | 10 | .706 |
| Texas Tech | 12 | – | 6 | .667 | 26 | – | 8 | .765 |
| Colorado | 11 | – | 7 | .611 | 22 | – | 12 | .647 |
| Iowa State | 10 | – | 8 | .556 | 22 | – | 10 | .688 |
| Utah | 10 | – | 8 | .556 | 19 | – | 13 | .594 |
| BYU | 9 | – | 9 | .500 | 26 | – | 12 | .684 |
| Arizona State | 9 | – | 9 | .500 | 24 | – | 11 | .686 |
| Kansas | 8 | – | 10 | .444 | 22 | – | 14 | .611 |
| Kansas State | 8 | – | 10 | .444 | 19 | – | 18 | .514 |
| Cincinnati | 6 | – | 12 | .333 | 11 | – | 20 | .355 |
| UCF | 3 | – | 15 | .167 | 11 | – | 19 | .367 |
| Arizona | 3 | – | 15 | .167 | 12 | – | 18 | .400 |
| Houston | 1 | – | 17 | .056 | 7 | – | 23 | .233 |
† 2026 Big 12 tournament winner Rankings from AP poll

The 2025–26 Oklahoma State Cowgirls basketball team represents Oklahoma State University during the 2025–26 NCAA Division I women's basketball season. The Cowgirls, led by fourth-year head coach Jacie Hoyt, played their home games at the Gallagher-Iba Arena in Stillwater, Oklahoma as members of the Big 12 Conference.

== Previous season ==
The Cowgirls finished the 2024–25 season 25–7, 14–4 in Big 12 play, to finish in third place. They defeated Texas Tech in the quarterfinals of the Big 12 women's tournament before losing to Baylor in the semifinals. They received an at-large bid to the NCAA tournament as a No. 7 seed in the Spokane Region 4, where they lost in the first round to South Dakota State.

== Offseason ==
=== Departures ===
| Name | Number | Pos. | Height | Year | Hometown | Reason for departure |
|---|---|---|---|---|---|---|
| Anna Gret Asi | 4 | G | 5'8" | Senior | Tartu, Estonia | Graduated |
| Maria Anis Rodriguez | 7 | F | 6'1" | Freshman | Barcelona, Spain | Transferred to Arkansas |
| Rylee Langerman | 11 | G | 5'9" | Graduate student | Del City, OK | Graduated |
| Brenna Butler | 15 | G | 5'6" | Sophomore | Gruver, TX | Transferred to Oklahoma Baptist |
| Stacie Jones | 20 | F | 6'1" | Graduate student | Kathleen, GA | Graduated |
| Kennedy Evans | 21 | G | 5'10" | Freshman | Little Elm, TX | Transferred to Louisiana Tech |
| Alexis Smith | 25 | G | 5'8" | Graduate student | Columbus, OH | Graduated |
| Landry Williams | 30 | G | 5'9" | Senior | Tulsa, OK | Graduated |
| Ténin Magassa | 34 | C | 6'6" | Graduate student | Morsang-sur-Orge, France | Graduated |

=== Incoming transfers ===
| Name | Number | Pos. | Height | Year | Hometown | Previous school |
|---|---|---|---|---|---|---|
| Amari Whiting | 1 | G | 5'10" | Junior | Boise, ID | BYU |
| Favour Onoh | 10 | C | 6'5" | Sophomore | Enugu, Nigeria | University of Philippines |
| Achol Akot | 11 | F | 6'1" | Junior | Ottawa, ON | UCF |
| Haleigh Timmer | 13 | G | 5'11" | (redshirt) Senior | Rapid City, SD | South Dakota State |
| Tyla Heard | 33 | G/F | 5'11" | Sophomore | Sapulpa, OK | Oral Roberts |
| Wilnie Joseph | 35 | C | 6'5" | Graduate student | Greenwood, IN | McNeese |
| Faith Acker | 55 | C | 6'2" | Junior | Winnsboro, TX | Tarleton State |

==== Recruiting ====
College recruiting
| Name | Hometown | School | Height | Weight | Commit date |
|---|---|---|---|---|---|
| Lena Girardi; G | Fort Lauderdale, FL | Grandview Prep School | 6 ft 0 in (1.83 m) | N/A | |
| Lena Girardi; G | Recruit ratings: ESPN: (93) | | | | |
Overall recruit ranking:
Note: In many cases, Scout, Rivals, 247Sports, On3, and ESPN may conflict in their listings of height and weight.; In these cases, the average was taken. ESPN grades are on a 100-point scale.; Sources: "2025 Player Commits". ESPN. Archived from the original on October 30, 2025.

== Roster ==
2025–26 Oklahoma State Cowgirls women's basketball team
Players
Coaches

| Pos. | # | Name | Height | Year | Previous school | Hometown |
|---|---|---|---|---|---|---|
| G | 1 | Amari Whiting | 5 ft 10 in (1.78 m) | Jr | Burley High School; BYU | Boise, ID |
| G | 2 | Lena Girardi | 5 ft 11 in (1.8 m) | Fr | Grandview Preparatory School | Purchase, NY |
| G | 3 | Micah Gray | 5 ft 8 in (1.73 m) | Sr | Classen SAS; Seton Hall | Oklahoma City, OK |
| G | 6 | Jadyn Wooten | 5 ft 6 in (1.68 m) | So | Blue Valley High School | Overland Park, KS |
| C | 10 | Favour Onoh | 6 ft 5 in (1.96 m) | So | University of Philippines | Enugu, Nigeria |
| F | 11 | Achol Akot | 6 ft 1 in (1.85 m) | Jr | Capital Courts Academy; UCF | Ottawa, ON |
| G | 13 | Haleigh Timmer | 5 ft 11 in (1.8 m) | RS Sr | St. Thomas More High School; South Dakota State | Rapid City, SD |
| G | 22 | Macey Huard | 6 ft 2 in (1.88 m) | Jr | Valor Christian High School; Montana | Highlands Ranch, CO |
| F | 24 | Praise Egharevba | 6 ft 3 in (1.91 m) | RS Jr | Nottingham Academy | Papenburg, Germany |
| G | 32 | Stailee Heard | 5 ft 11 in (1.8 m) | Jr | Sapulpa High School | Sapulpa, OK |
| G/F | 33 | Tyla Heard | 5 ft 11 in (1.8 m) | So | Sapulpa High School; Oral Roberts | Sapulpa, OK |
| C | 35 | Wilnie Joseph | 6 ft 5 in (1.96 m) | GS | Whiteland High School; McNeese | Atlanta, GA |
| C | 55 | Faith Acker | 6 ft 2 in (1.88 m) | Jr | Winnsboro High School; Tarleton State | Winnsboro, TX |

Head coach

- Jacie Hoyt (Wichita State)

Assistant coach(es)

- Kelby Jones (North Texas)
- Mandi Carver (Idaho State)
- Ashley Davis (TCU)
- Robyne Bostick (Saint Joseph's)
- Terran Hoyt (Nebraska–Kearney)

Legend

- (C) Team captain
- (S) Suspended
- (I) Ineligible
- (W) Walk-on
- Injured
- Current redshirt

Roster

== Schedule and results ==
| Date time, TV | Rank^{#} | Opponent^{#} | Result | Record | High points | High rebounds | High assists | Site (attendance) city, state |
Exhibition
| October 28, 2025*; 6:30 p.m. | No. 22 | Oklahoma Christian | W 104–51 | | – | – | – | Gallagher-Iba Arena; Stillwater, OK |
Non-conference regular season
| November 3, 2025*; 6:30 p.m., ESPN+ | No. 22 | New Orleans | W 109–48 | 1–0 | 24 – Gray | 12 – Egharevba | 6 – Timmer | Gallagher-Iba Arena (2,193); Stillwater, OK |
| November 5, 2025*; 6:30 p.m., ESPN+ | No. 22 | East Texas A&M | W 97–59 | 2–0 | 22 – Timmer | 9 – Whiting | 4 – Tied | Gallagher-Iba Arena (2,096); Stillwater, OK |
| November 6, 2025*; 6:30 p.m., ESPN+ | No. 22 | Langston | W 105–35 | 3–0 | 29 – Girardi | 7 – S. Heard | 7 – Wooten | Gallagher-Iba Arena (2,402); Stillwater, OK |
| November 9, 2025*; 5:00 p.m., ESPN+ | No. 22 | Oral Roberts | W 112–62 | 4–0 | 23 – Akot | 10 – Akot | 9 – Tied | Gallagher-Iba Arena (7,501); Stillwater, OK |
| November 11, 2025*; 11:00 a.m., ESPN+ | No. 20 | Prairie View A&M | W 105–55 | 5–0 | 25 – Gray | 11 – Akot | 8 – Wooten | Gallagher-Iba Arena (3,056); Stillwater, OK |
| November 19, 2025*; 6:30 p.m., ESPN+ | No. 18 | at St. John's | L 67–74 | 5–1 | 15 – S. Heard | 6 – Akot | 4 – Tied | Carnesecca Arena (726); Queens, NY |
| November 24, 2025*; 6:30 p.m., ESPN+ | No. 24 | Texas A&M–Corpus Christi | W 98–45 | 6–1 | 25 – Timmer | 6 – Wooten | 8 – Wooten | Gallagher-Iba Arena (2,536); Stillwater, OK |
| November 28, 2025*; 10:00 a.m., FloCollege | No. 24 | vs. Charlotte; Cayman Islands Classic Little Cayman Division | W 74–65 | 7–1 | 16 – Akot | 8 – Akot | 5 – Heard | John Gray Gymnasium; George Town, Cayman Islands |
| November 29, 2025*; 10:00 a.m., FloCollege | No. 24 | vs. Miami (FL); Cayman Islands Classic Little Cayman Division | W 87–84 | 8–1 | 23 – Whiting | 6 – Tied | 8 – Whiting | John Gray Gymnasium (475); George Town, Cayman Islands |
| December 3, 2025*; 6:00 p.m., ESPN+ | No. 24 | at North Texas | W 73–55 | 9–1 | 23 – Timmer | 14 – Akot | 4 – Whiting | The Super Pit (1,819); Denton, TX |
| December 6, 2025*; 2:00 p.m., ESPN+ | No. 24 | Mississippi Valley State | W 133–46 | 10–1 | 26 – S. Heard | 8 – Whiting | 13 – Wooten | Gallagher-Iba Arena (2,674); Stillwater, OK |
| December 13, 2025*; 3:00 p.m., ESPNU | No. 23 | vs. No. 9 Oklahoma; Bedlam Series | L 70–92 | 10–2 | 22 – Gray | 7 – Tied | 4 – Wooten | Paycom Center (10,552); Oklahoma City, OK |
| December 15, 2025*; 6:30 p.m., ESPN+ | | Tulsa | W 90–58 | 11–2 | 20 – Gray | 6 – Tied | 7 – Wooten | Gallagher-Iba Arena (2,021); Stillwater, OK |
Big 12 regular season
| December 21, 2025; 1:00 p.m., ESPN+ | | at Cincinnati | W 91–63 | 12–2 (1–0) | 35 – Timmer | 12 – Akot | 7 – Wooten | Fifth Third Arena (1,184); Cincinnati, OH |
| December 31, 2025; 2:00 p.m., ESPN+ | | No. 22 Baylor | L 68–77 | 12–3 (1–1) | 16 – Wooten | 10 – Akot | 3 – Akot | Gallagher-Iba Arena (4,259); Stillwater, OK |
| January 3, 2026; 3:00 p.m., ESPN+ | | Houston | W 83–52 | 13–3 (2–1) | 21 – Tied | 9 – Akot | 8 – Wooten | Gallagher-Iba Arena (2,771); Stillwater, OK |
| January 7, 2026; 6:30 p.m., ESPN+ | | at No. 13 TCU | L 61–69 | 13–4 (2–2) | 25 – Wooten | 9 – Akot | 2 – Tied | Schollmaier Arena (2,827); Fort Worth, TX |
| January 11, 2026; 1:00 p.m., ESPN+ | | Colorado | W 63–56 | 14–4 (3–2) | 21 – S. Heard | 8 – S. Heard | 4 – Wooten | Gallagher-Iba Arena (2,597); Stillwater, OK |
| January 14, 2026; 6:30 p.m., ESPN+ | | at Kansas | W 85–76 | 15–4 (4–2) | 21 – S. Heard | 9 – S. Heard | 4 – Wooten | Allen Fieldhouse (3,346); Lawrence, KS |
| January 18, 2026; 12:00 p.m., FOX | | No. 19 Iowa State | W 86–58 | 16–4 (5–2) | 18 – S. Heard | 17 – S. Heard | 10 – S. Heard | Gallagher-Iba Arena (3,941); Stillwater, OK |
| January 25, 2026; 2:00 p.m., ESPN+ | | at Colorado | L 65–79 | 16–5 (5–3) | 22 – Akot | 9 – Akot | 4 – Wooten | CU Events Center (3,152); Boulder, CO |
| January 28, 2026; 6:30 p.m., ESPN+ | | BYU | W 67–51 | 17–5 (6–3) | 25 – Gray | 14 – Akot | 7 – S. Heard | Gallagher-Iba Arena (2,596); Stillwater, OK |
| February 1, 2026; 3:00 p.m., ESPN+ | | at Arizona | W 88–69 | 18–5 (7–3) | 23 – Tied | 11 – S. Heard | 8 – Wooten | McKale Center (7,802); Tucson, AZ |
| February 4, 2026; 7:30 p.m., ESPN+ | | at Arizona State | L 69–74 | 18–6 (7–4) | 18 – Akot | 9 – Akot | 4 – Wooten | Desert Financial Arena (3,138); Tempe, AZ |
| February 7, 2026; 1:00 p.m., ESPN+ | | UCF | W 81–58 | 19–6 (8–4) | 15 – Whiting | 8 – S. Heard | 8 – Wooten | Gallagher-Iba Arena (2,678); Stillwater, OK |
| February 10, 2026; 6:30 p.m., ESPN+ | | at Kansas State | L 61–70 | 19–7 (8–5) | 16 – Tied | 9 – Whiting | 4 – S. Heard | Bramlage Coliseum (3,856); Manhattan, KS |
| February 14, 2026; 2:00 p.m., ESPN+ | | No. 16 Texas Tech | W 75–65 | 20–7 (9–5) | 16 – Wooten | 11 – Whiting | 7 – Wooten | Gallagher-Iba Arena (7,098); Stillwater, OK |
| February 16, 2026; 1:00 p.m., FOX | | Utah | W 73–55 | 21–7 (10–5) | 17 – Gray | 7 – Timmer | 4 – Tied | Gallagher-Iba Arena (2,746); Stillwater, OK |
| February 21, 2026; 1:00 p.m., ESPN+ | | at No. 19 West Virginia | L 40–72 | 21–8 (10–6) | 13 – S. Heard | 8 – Tied | 2 – Akot | Hope Coliseum (5,052); Morgantown, WV |
| February 25, 2026; 6:30 p.m., ESPN+ | | at Iowa State | W 88–77 | 22–8 (11–6) | 25 – Akot | 14 – Heard | 5 – Wooten | Hilton Coliseum (9,686); Ames, IA |
| February 28, 2026; 5:00 p.m., FS1 | | Kansas | W 70–56 | 23–8 (12–6) | 18 – Akot | 9 – Akot | 7 – Wooten | Gallagher-Iba Arena (3,091); Stillwater, OK |
Big 12 Conference tournament
| March 6, 2026; 11:00 a.m., ESPNU | (4) | vs. (12) Kansas State; Quarterfinals | L 73–74 | 23–9 | 18 – S. Heard | 10 – Whiting | 5 – Wooten | T-Mobile Center; Kansas City, MO |
NCAA Tournament
| March 21, 2026*; 6:30 p.m., ESPN2 | (8 S2) | vs. (9 S2) No. 23 Princeton; First round | W 82–68 | 24–9 | 28 – Akot | 10 – Akot | 10 – Wooten | Pauley Pavilion (7,250); Los Angeles, CA |
| March 23, 2026*; 9:00 p.m., ESPN | (8 S2) | at (1 S2) No. 2 UCLA; Second round | L 68–87 | 24–10 | 23 – Akot | 6 – Heard | 6 – Wooten | Pauley Pavilion (6,114); Los Angeles, CA |
*Non-conference game. ^{#}Rankings from AP poll. (#) Tournament seedings in parentheses. S2=Sacramento 2. All times are in Central.

== Rankings ==
Ranking movements Legend: ██ Increase in ranking ██ Decrease in ranking — = Not ranked RV = Received votes
| | Week | | | | | | | | | | | | | | | | | | | | |
| Poll | Pre | 1 | 2 | 3 | 4 | 5 | 6 | 7 | 8 | 9 | 10 | 11 | 12 | 13 | 14 | 15 | 16 | 17 | 18 | 19 | Final |
|---|---|---|---|---|---|---|---|---|---|---|---|---|---|---|---|---|---|---|---|---|---|
| AP | 22 | 20 | 18 | 24 | 24 | 23 | RV | RV | RV* | RV | — | RV | RV | RV | — | — | — | RV | | | |
| Coaches | 22 | 22 | 21 | 25 | 23 | 22 | RV | RV | RV | RV | RV | RV | RV | RV | — | RV | — | RV | | | |

*AP did not release a week 8 poll.

== See also ==
- 2025–26 Oklahoma State Cowboys basketball team
