= Mathew Montebon =

Filipino basketball player (born 2003)

No. 3 – Adamson Soaring Falcons
- Position: Shooting guard
- League: UAAP

Personal information
- Born: January 25, 2003 (age 23) Newark, California, U.S.
- Listed height: 6 ft 0 in (1.83 m)

Career information
- High school: Newark Memorial (Newark, California)
- College: Paul Smith's College (2021–2022); Adamson (2023–present)

Career highlights
- AsiaBasket champion (2025 International)

Mathew Jacob "Monty" Montilla Montebon (born January 25, 2003) is a Filipino-American college basketball player for the Adamson Soaring Falcons of the University Athletic Association of the Philippines (UAAP).

== High school career ==
Montebon played varsity basketball for the Newark Memorial High School Cougars.

== College career ==
=== Paul Smith's College Bobcats (2021–22) ===
Montebon started his college career with a stint with the Paul Smith's College Bobcats. In his time there, he averaged just 3.8 points.

=== Adamson Soaring Falcons (2023–present) ===
Montebon has quickly been known for his big shots in Philippine collegiate basketball, playing for the Adamson Soaring Falcons in his first year as senior teammate Jerom Lastimosa was not available. In a pre-season game on June 4, 2023, the Soaring Falcons came back from a 27-point deficit and leaned on Montebon's buzzer-beating three-point shot to shock the Ateneo Blue Eagles, 61–60.

Montebon debuted in the UAAP with 13 points, three rebounds, two assists, and two steals to step up for Adamson in a 51–68 loss to the UP Fighting Maroons on October 1, 2023. On October 7, 2023, the same Ateneo team lost to Adamson in the first round of the UAAP Season 86 basketball championship despite leading by as much as 19 points thanks to the Falcon rookie's three-point shot from the left corner in regulation, 69-all, and senior teammate Vince Magbuhos' buzzer-beater triple in overtime, 74–71.

On November 19, 2023, the Soaring Falcons won a tough fight against the UE Red Warriors to earn a playoff for the last spot in the Final Four, with Montebon demonstrating why he is said to be the heir apparent to the outgoing King Falcon Jerom Lastimosa. With 2.7 seconds left, Montebon hit another left-corner triple for the win, edging UE, 63–61.

Adamson lost to defending champion Ateneo in the playoff held a few days before Montebon was honored as the Collegiate Press Corps' Player of the Week.

For Season 87, Montebon continued being a scorer, such as when he scored 15 points, five rebounds, four assists and two steals, in a win over the UST Growling Tigers. Despite his high-scoring numbers, Adamson went on a losing streak with that began with close losses to UE and the FEU Tamaraws, and ended at five games with a blowout loss to UP. With their season on the line, he became more of a playmaker, with seven assists in a win over Ateneo to force a playoff against UE for the fourth seed. He then had six assists in that playoff alongside 13 points as Adamson secured the fourth seed in the Final Four. In the Final Four, their season ended with a blowout loss to the De La Salle Green Archers.

== Personal life ==
Montebon said he plans out his schedule early in the week to balance his time for Marketing studies with basketball and ties with parents Robert Montebon and Regina Montilla, among others.

== Awards ==
- Most Valuable Player, 2024 Mayor Kirk Asis Invitational Basketball Tournament
