= Asian College =

Private college in the Philippines

- Former names: Asian Institute of Electronics; Asian College of Science and Technology (ACSAT)
- Motto in English: Developing Leaders in IT and Management
- Type: Private, Nonsectarian, Co-educational
- Established: 1972; 54 years ago
- Founders: Constancio A. Sia; Gloria Durano-Sia
- Location: 8F/ 1013 Aurora Blvd., Project 3, Quezon City, Metro Manila, Philippines (head office); 14°37′46″N 121°04′08″E
- Campus: Main Quezon City Satellite: Dumaguete
- Website: www.asiancollege.edu.ph

Asian College (formerly Asian Institute of Electronics and Asian College of Science and Technology) is a CHED and TESDA-accredited private tertiary educational institution in the Philippines founded in 1972. It has campuses in Quezon City and Dumaguete. It also offers DepEd and TESDA-certified senior high school.

== History ==
Asian College was founded as the Asian Institute of Electronics (AIE) in 1972 by Dr. Constancio A. Sia and his wife, Gloria Durano-Sia. Within 15 years, it managed to expand campuses outside Metro Manila. The Baliuag branch was opened in 1988, followed by Dumaguete in 1991, and then Cagayan de Oro in 1994. In the succeeding years, it opened campuses in different locations across the country specifically on: Novaliches, Caloocan, and Alabang in National Capital Region; Masinag and Antipolo in Region 4; and Cabanatuan in Region 3. Six franchised campuses were subsequently established, namely Carriedo, Manila and Mandaluyong in National Capital Region; Sta Maria, Bulacan and Pampanga in Region 3; Calamba, Laguna in Region 4 and Sorsogon in Region 5. Student population mainly determine the longevity of the campuses.

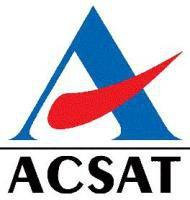
Asian College's previous logo under the Asian College of Science and Technology name from 1995 to 2012

In June 1995, AIE was accredited by then-DECS (Department of Education Culture and Sports), as a full-fledged college, thus a change in name to Asian College of Science and Technology (ACSAT).

In 2012, the board of trustees decided to change the short name of the school to “Asian College” to emphasize that the institution does not merely cater on science and technology courses alone, but also focuses on developing professionals in the fields of business and management.

== Current campuses ==
- Quezon City campus (Main Campus)
  - 8F/ 1013 Aurora Blvd., Project 3, Quezon City
- Dumaguete campus
  - Dr. V. Locsin Street, Dumaguete

== Alumni ==
- Jerom Lastimosa - basketball player
- Calvin Oftana - basketball player
