= Chris Gavina =

Filipino basketball player and coach

Personal information
- Born: January 27, 1979 (age 47)
- Listed height: 5 ft 11 in (1.80 m)

Career information
- College: Stevens Institute of Technology
- Playing career: 2016–present
- Position: Head coach

Career history

Coaching
- 2016–2017: Mahindra Enforcer/Kia Picanto (assistant)
- 2017–2018: Kia Picanto
- 2018: Valenzuela Classic
- 2018–2020: Rain or Shine Elasto Painters (assistant)
- 2019–2021: Bacoor Strikers
- 2021–2022: Rain or Shine Elasto Painters
- 2022: Rain or Shine Elasto Painters (assistant)
- 2022–2023: Taichung Suns
- 2025–2026: UE

Christian Gavina (born January 27, 1979) is a Filipino professional basketball coach.

== Early life and college career ==
Gavina was born in the Philippines and migrated to Jersey City, New Jersey when he was three years old. He played college basketball for the Stevens Institute of Technology in Hoboken, New Jersey. He finished second in all-time scoring for the school and have his jersey number retired after his graduation in 2001.

After graduation, he tried to apply for PBA draft in 2003, but his application were denied due to lack of proper documents

He worked as a formulation chemist for L'Oreal from 2004 to 2008 and then moved back to the Philippines to pursue a career in basketball. He first played for the Quezon Red Oilers and the Mandaue-Cebu Landmasters of the defunct Liga Pilipinas.

== Coaching career ==
After his contract expired with Mandaue, he returned to the United States and earned a strength and conditioning coach certification at the Institute of Sports and Science. He returned to Manila and got a job for ABL's AirAsia Philippine Patriots' as their strength and conditioning coach in 2011. When the Patriots were disbanded in 2012, he then moved to GlobalPort Batang Pier of the PBA.

In 2016, Gavina was named as the first assistant coach of Manny Pacquiao for the Mahindra Floodbuster, replacing Chito Victolero. Although Pacquiao is named as the head coach of the Floodbuster, Gavina ran the day-to-day practices and acted as the head coach in Pacquiao's absence.

After Pacquiao's contract as player-coach in Mahindra (later renamed as Kia Picanto in 2017) expired after the 2016–17 season, Gavina was named as the head coach of the Picanto.

On 2018, Gavina returned to PBA after being tapped as an assistant coach of the Rain or Shine Elasto Painters.

On October 25, 2022, Gavina signed with the Taichung Suns of the T1 League for head coach. On June 29, 2023, Gavina left the Taichung Suns.

Gavina was named as the head coach of the UE Red Warriors on February 13, 2025. On his first UAAP season, Gavina, after a loss against the De La Salle Green Archers, launched an expletive-riddled rant at the post-game press conference. The UAAP then suspended Gavina for four games. UE finished the season winless after 14 games. In 2026, UE started the season on a 0–2 record. Gavina then resigned prior to their third game, being replaced by Paulo Hubalde. The Warriors were in the midst of a 22-game losing streak when he resigned.

== Coaching record ==
=== PBA ===
Season	Team	Conference	Elimination round					Playoffs				
Season	Team	Conference	GP	W	L	PCT	Finish	PG	W	L	PCT	Results
2017–18	Columbian	Philippine Cup	2	0	2	.000	–	—	—	—	—	Resigned
2021	Rain or Shine	Philippine Cup	11	6	5	.545	6th/12	2	0	2	.000	Lost in the Quarterfinals
2021	Rain or Shine	Governors' Cup	11	3	8	.273	10th/12	—	—	—	—	Did not qualify
Career Total			24	9	15	.375	—	2	0	2	.000	0 championship

=== T1 League ===
Season	Team	Regular season				Postseason			
Season	Team	W	L	PCT	Finish	W	L	PCT	Result
2022–23	Taichung Suns	8	22	.267	5th/6	2	3	.400	Won Play-in vs TaiwanBeer HeroBears, 2–1; Lost Semifinals to New Taipei CTBC DEA, 0–3
Totals		8	22	.267	—	2	3	.400	1 playoff appearance

=== Collegiate ===
Season	Team	Elimination round					Playoffs				
Season	Team	GP	W	L	PCT	Finish	GP	W	L	PCT	Results
2025	UE	10	0	10	.000	8th/8	Did not qualify				
2026	UE	2	0	2	.000	8th/8	Resigned midseason				
Totals		12	0	12	.000	—	0	0	0	—	0 championships
