= Mike Fermin =

Filipino basketball coach

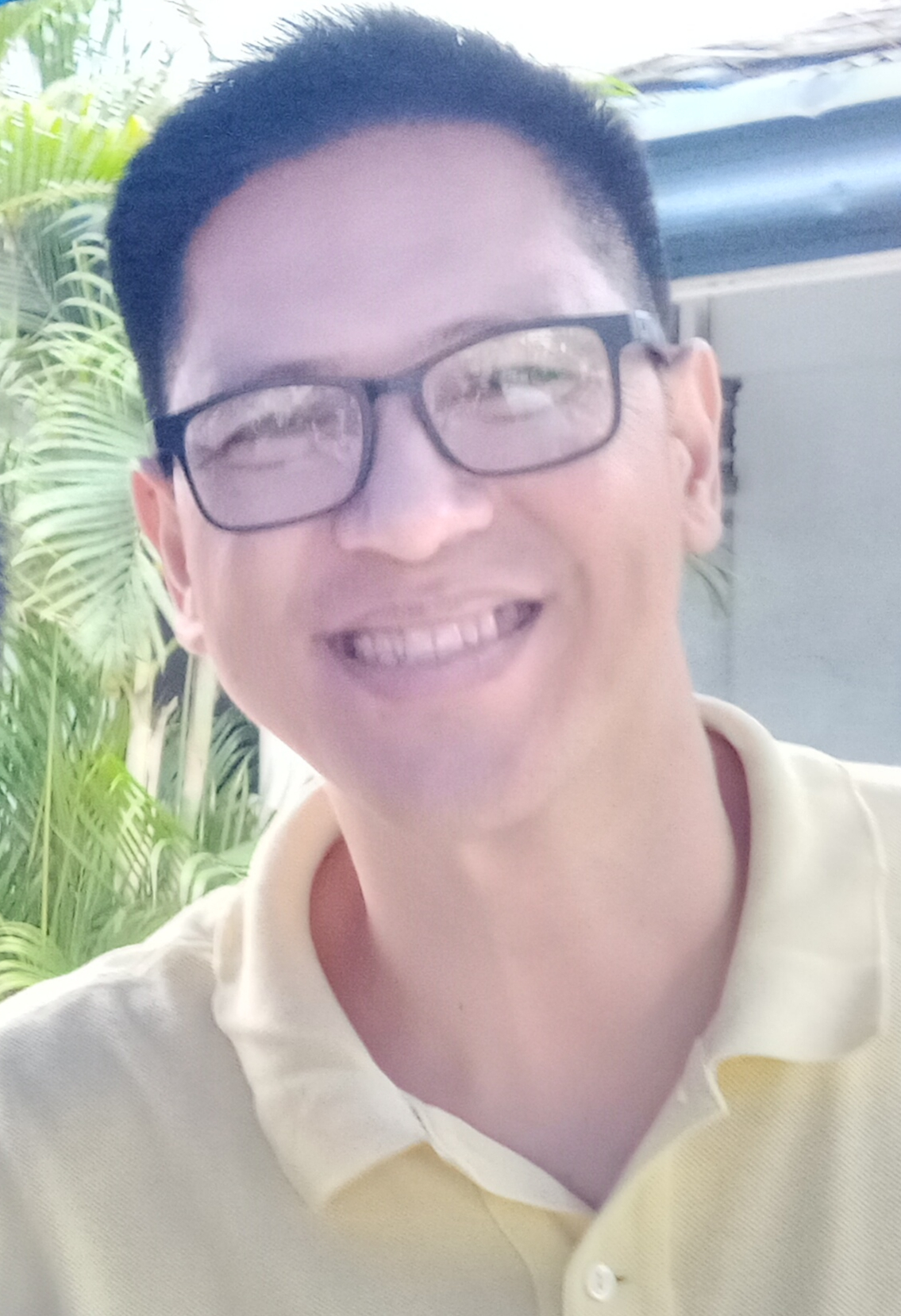
- Fermin in 2024

Adamson Baby Falcons
- Position: Head coach
- League: UAAP

Career information
- High school: Letran (Manila)
- College: UP

Career history

Coaching
- 2015: Adamson (men)
- 2016–2021: Adamson (men) (assistant)
- 2016–2017: Adamson (women)
- 2018–present: Adamson HS
- 2023–present: Adamson (men) (assistant)
- 2026–present: Titan Ultra Giant Risers (assistant)

Career highlights
- As head coach: UAAP Juniors champions (2023–24)

Michael A. Fermin is a Filipino coach.

== Career ==
Fermin played for the Letran Squires in high school and for the UP Fighting Maroons in college.

Fermin served as head coach of the Adamson Soaring Falcons in an interim basis in 2015. He would later be named head coach for the Adamson women's team from 2016 to 2017, and later with the Baby Falcons juniors' team.

He steered the Baby Falcons into championship in 2023.
