= Adamson Soaring Falcons basketball =

Philippine collegiate varsity team

Adamson Soaring Falcons
2026 Adamson Soaring Falcons basketball team
- University: Adamson University
- History: Adamson Falcons (until 2005); Adamson Soaring Falcons (since 2006)
- Head coach: Nash Racela (6th season)
- Location: Ermita, Manila
- Nickname: Soaring Falcons
- Colors: Navy blue, Baby blue, and White

UAAP Champion (1)
- 1977

The Adamson Soaring Falcons are the collegiate men's basketball team representing Adamson University. The team competes in the University Athletic Association of the Philippines (UAAP) men's basketball tournament.

== History ==
Adamson University along with Manila Central University (MCU), University of Manila and University of the East (UE) were admitted in 1952 on a two-year probationary membership status. Only UE and MCU retained as permanent member. However, MCU pulled-out in 1962. Adamson was readmitted into the association in 1970.

Adamson Soaring Falcons won its first Championship in the UAAP in UAAP Season 40 (1977–1978).

== Roster ==
Adamson Soaring Falcons roster
Players
Coaches

Pos.	No.	Nat.	Name	Height	Year	High School
C	1	(United States)	Lance Mangaron	6'0" (1.83m)	1st	–
G	3	(United States)	Mathew Montebon	6'0" (1.83m)	5th	Newark Memorial High School
F/C	5	(Nigeria)	Jonah Precious	6'8" (2.03m)	1st	–
F	6	(Australia)	Noah Miles Pacquiao	6'3" (1.91m)	1st	–
F/C	8	(Philippines)	Henjz Gabriel Demisana	6'8" (2.03m)	2nd	UP Integrated School
F/C	9	(Philippines)	Louis Allen Perez	6'7" (2.01m)	5th	Adamson High School
F	11	(Philippines)	Joshua Barcelona	6'6" (1.98m)	5th	Adamson High School
F/C	13	(United States)	Hunter Cruz-Dumont	6'8" (2.03m)	1st	Vancouver College
SG	16	(Philippines)	Ray Allen Torres	6'0" (1.83m)	5th	UP Integrated School
G	18	(Philippines)	John Mattroven N. Erolon	6'2" (1.88m)	5th	Adamson High School
SF	20	(Philippines)	Emmanuel Anabo	6'4" (1.93m)	5th	Colegio de San Juan de Letran
SG	21	(Philippines)	John Earl Medina	6'2" (1.88m)	1st	Adamson High School
F/C	23	(Nigeria)	Mudiaga Ojarikre	6'11" (2.11m)	4th	Federal University of Technology Minna
PG	24	(Philippines)	Mahathir Edding	6'1" (1.85m)	1st	Adamson High School
G	25	(Philippines)	Kenji Cañete	6'2" (1.88m)	4th	Colegio de San Juan de Letran
F	27	(Philippines)	AJ Fransman	6'3" (1.91m)	3rd	Enderun College
C	33	(Philippines)	Jireh Tumaneng	6'8" (2.03m)	2nd	Westlake Boys High School

Head coach

- (Philippines) Nash Racela

Assistant coach(es)

- (Philippines) Rommel Adducul (Lead Assistant Coach)
- (Philippines) Gilbert Lao
- (Philippines) Mike Fermin
- (Philippines) Jem Ryan Betia
- (Philippines) Allan Albano
- (Philippines) Ed Dela Torre
- (Philippines) Benjamin Sipin
- (Philippines) Jonathan de Guzman
- (Philippines) Wilfrey Magbuhos
- (Philippines) Michael Oliver

Team manager

- (Philippines) Gilbert Cruz

Legend

- (C) Team captain
- Injured

== Head coaches ==
- 1977: Moises Urbiztondo
- 1989–1992: Orlando Bauzon
- 1993: Hector Hipolito
- 1995–1996: Antonio Guinto
- 1997–1999: Moises Urbiztondo
- 2000–2004: Luigi Trillo
- 2005: Mel Alas
- 2006: Leo Austria
- 2007: Bogs Adornado
- 2008–2013: Leo Austria
- 2014: Kenneth Duremdes
- 2015: Mike Fermin
- 2016–2020: Franz Pumaren
- 2021–present: Nash Racela

== Season-by-season records ==
Until 1997, the UAAP primarily ranked the teams by tournament points using FIBA's method. Starting in 1998, the UAAP primarily ranked by winning percentage. There's no difference in ranking once all games were played, but in the middle of the season, rankings made by these two methods may differ.

=== Until 1997 ===
Season	League	Elimination round					Playoffs			
Season	League	Pos	GP	W	L	Pts	GP	W	L	Results
1987	UAAP	6th/8	14	5	9	19	Did not qualify			
1988	UAAP	4th/8	14	7	7	21	Did not qualify			
1989	UAAP	6th/8	14	6	8	20	Did not qualify			
1990	UAAP	6th/8	14	6	8	20	Did not qualify			
1991	UAAP	6th/8					Did not qualify			
1992	UAAP	1st/8	14	11	3	25	2	0	2	Lost Finals vs FEU
1993	UAAP	2nd/8	14	11	3	25	No playoffs held (Note: UST won all elimination round games. Based on the rules at that time, they were then named automatic champions, and other teams were ranked by elimination round finish.)			
1994	UAAP	Suspended (Note: Adamson was found to have an ineligible player in the previous seasons, which caused them to be suspended by the UAAP for the 1994 season.)								
1995	UAAP	6th/8	14	4	10	18	Did not qualify			
1996	UAAP	8th/8	14	3	11	17	Did not qualify			
1997	UAAP	7th/8	14	4	10	18	Did not qualify			

=== Since 1998 ===
Season	League	Elimination round						Playoffs			
Season	League	Pos	GP	W	L	PCT	GB	GP	W	L	Results
1998	UAAP	8th/8	14	1	13	.071	12	Did not qualify			
1999	UAAP	8th/8	14	1	13	.071	10	Did not qualify			
2000	UAAP	8th/8	14	0	14	.000	12	Did not qualify			
2001	UAAP	8th/8	14	0	14	.000	12	Did not qualify			
2002	UAAP	7th/8	14	3	11	.214	10	Did not qualify			
2003	UAAP	5th/8	14	5	9	.357	6	Did not qualify			
2004	UAAP	6th/8	14	5	9	.357	6	Did not qualify			
2005	UAAP	7th/8	14	3	11	.214	9	Did not qualify			
2006	UAAP	4th/7	12	6	6	.500	4	2	0	2	Lost semifinals vs Ateneo
2007	UAAP	7th/8	14	2	12	.143	12	Did not qualify			
2008	UAAP	7th/8	14	3	11	.214	10	Did not qualify			
2009	UAAP	5th/8	14	5	9	.357	8	Did not qualify			
2010	UAAP	3rd/8	14	9	5	.643	3	1	0	1	Lost semifinals vs Ateneo
2011	UAAP	2nd/8	14	10	4	.714	3	2	0	2	Lost semifinals vs FEU
2012	UAAP	6th/8	14	3	11	.214	9	Did not qualify			
2013	UAAP	7th/8	14	4	10	.286	6	Did not qualify			
2014	UAAP	8th/8	14	1	13	.071	10	Did not qualify			
2015	UAAP	8th/8	14	3	11	.214	8	Did not qualify			
2016	UAAP	4th/8	14	8	6	.571	3	1	0	1	Lost semifinals vs La Salle
2017	UAAP	3rd/8	14	9	5	.643	4	1	0	1	Lost semifinals vs La Salle
2018	UAAP	2nd/8	14	10	4	.714	2	2	0	2	Lost semifinals vs UP
2019	UAAP	6th/8	14	4	10	.286	10	Did not qualify			
2020 (Note: Season cancelled due to the COVID-19 pandemic.)	UAAP	Season canceled									
2022 (S84)	UAAP	5th/8	14	6	8	.429	7	Did not qualify			
2022 (S85)	UAAP	4th/8	14	7	7	.500	4	2	1	1	Lost semifinals vs Ateneo
2023	UAAP	5th/8	14	7	7	.500	5	1	0	1	Lost 4th seed playoff vs Ateneo
2024	UAAP	4th/8	14	6	8	.429	6	2	1	1	Lost semifinals vs La Salle
2025	UAAP	7th/8	14	6	8	.429	5	Did not qualify			

== Honors ==
=== Team awards ===
- University Athletic Association of the Philippines (UAAP)
  - Champions (1): 1977

=== Individual awards ===
- UAAP Most Valuable Player:
  - Ken Bono (1): 2006

== Notable players ==
- Jerrick Ahanmisi
- Louie Alas
- Chad Alonzo
- Lester Alvarez
- Marlou Aquino
- Matthew Aquino
- Ken Bono
- Rodney Brondial
- Ryan Monteclaro
- Hector Calma
- Simon Camacho
- Eric Camson
- Jericho Cruz
- Kenneth Duremdes
- Gherome Ejercito
- E.J. Feihl
- Jerom Lastimosa
- Eddie Laure
- Melvin Mamaclay
- Sean Manganti
- Cedrick Manzano
- Alex Nuyles
- Jansen Rios
- Ompong Segura
- Don Trollano
- Keith Zaldivar
- Joshua Yerro
- Jed Colonia
- Royce Mantua

== See also ==
- Adamson University
- Adamson Soaring Falcons
