= Ryan Monteclaro =

Filipino basketball player and coach

Personal information
- Listed height: 5 ft 7 in (1.70 m)

Career information
- High school: San Beda (Manila); UE (Manila)
- College: Adamson
- PBA draft: 2018: 3rd round31st overall pick
- Drafted by: San Miguel Beermen
- Position: Point guard

Career history

Coaching
- 2023–2025: Adamson (women)

Ryan Christopher Monteclaro is a Filipino basketball player and coach.

Monteclaro played for the Adamson Soaring Falcons in the University Athletic Association of the Philippines (UAAP) before winning championships when he called the shots as chief tactician or assistant coach for various teams in the Philippines, Singapore, Italy, and Vietnam. He is the former head coach of the Lady Falcons.

== Playing career ==
=== Varsity ===
Playing either point or shooting guard, Monteclaro went to San Beda University and University of the East for his high school education.

=== College / Amateur ===
Monteclaro played college basketball for the Adamson Soaring Falcons in the UAAP. He was a member of the Soaring Falcons who were runners-up to the Ateneo Blue Eagles in a pre-season tournament that was decided in Game 3.

Monteclaro, Alex Nuyles, and Eric Camson also helped Adamson earn the top 2 seed at the end of the 2-round elimination before taking home the 2nd-runner trophy in the UAAP Season 74 (2011) men's basketball tournament under head coach Leo Austria. Coach Austria and Monteclaro reunited in the pro ranks when the latter was drafted by the San Miguel Beermen in the 3rd round of the 2013 PBA Draft.

Before turning pro, Monteclaro played in the PBA Developmental League.

=== Professional ===
The Saigon Aces picked up Monteclaro as their playmaker and would later ask him to coach this Vietnam team.

== Coaching career ==
=== Collegiate coach ===
Monteclaro has been coaching the Adamson Lady Falcons since 2023 in the UAAP.

On November 30, 2024, Monteclaro and the Lady Falcons won in overtime over the Ateneo Blue Eagles in the stepladder semis. They later bagged bronze.

== Personal details ==
On the anniversary of the birthday of his late father, Resty, Monteclaro tries to keep a winning tradition every October 19.
