= Favour Onoh =

Nigerian basketball player (born 2005)

No. 10 – Oklahoma State Cowgirls
- Position: Center
- League: NCAA

Personal information
- Born: November 22, 2005 (age 20) Enugu State, Nigeria
- Listed height: 1.96 m (6 ft 5 in)

Career information
- College: UP (Philippines); OSU (Oklahama, US)

Favour Ogechukwu Onoh (born November 22, 2005) is a Nigerian basketball player who plays as a center at for the Oklahoma State Cowgirls in the National Collegiate Athletic Association.

== Early life ==
Favour Ogechukwu Onoh was born on November 22, 2005 in Enugu State, Nigeria. She started playing basketball in secondary school. She is a product of the Discover I'm Alive Basketball Academy of Nigeria.

== Career ==
=== Collegiate ===
==== UP Fighting Maroons ====
Onoh played for the women's team of the UP Fighting Maroons in the basketball championships of the University Athletic Association of the Philippines (UAAP) in 2024. She helped her school reach the Final Four for the first time since 2008 and was named Rookie of the Year for Season 86.

However she was unable to play in Season 87 due to an injury.

==== OSU Cowgirls ====
Onoh left the Philippines after she was recruited to play for the Oklahoma State Cowgirls in the US National Collegiate Athletic Association

=== National team ===
Onoh is being considered for naturalization as a Philippine citizen which could enable her to play for the Philippine national team.
