= Jed Colonia =

Filipino basketball player & coach (born 1999)

Personal information
- Born: February 23, 1999 (age 27)
- Listed height: 6 ft 2 in (1.88 m)

Career information
- High school: SHS-AdC (Mandaue)
- College: Adamson
- Position: Point guard

Career history

Coaching
- 2025: Adamson Lady Falcons

Career highlights
- 2x MVP, CESAFI Jrs. (2015-2016)
Medals
Boys basketball
Representing Philippines
SEABA Under-16 Championship
Gold medal – first place	2015 Cagayan de Oro	Team

Jed Cedrick Colonia is a Filipino basketball player and coach.

Colonia played for the Adamson Soaring Falcons in the University Athletic Association of the Philippines (UAAP) before calling the shots as head coach of the Lady Falcons.

== Playing career ==
=== High school ===
Colonia bagged back-to-back MVP honors when the Sacred Heart School – Ateneo de Cebu won the CESAFI juniors basketball championships in 2015 and 2016.

=== College ===
Then Adamson coach Franz Pumaren recruited Colonia, who would later play the point for the Soaring Falcons in the UAAP from 2018 to 2023.

=== National team ===
Colonia played for the Philippine national under-16 team at the 2015 SEABA Under-16 Championship.

== Coaching career ==
=== Collegiate coach ===
Colonia succeeded Ryan Monteclaro as head coach of the Adamson Lady Falcons in 2025.

On October 5, 2025, Colonia and the Lady Falcons grabbed their first win in UAAP Season 88 at the expense of the FEU Lady Tamaraws, 57–56.
