= Jerom Lastimosa =

Filipino basketball player

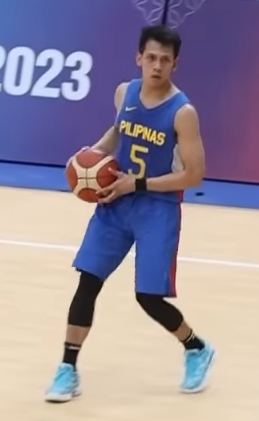

No. 30 – Magnolia Chicken Timplados Hotshots
- Position: Point guard
- League: PBA

Personal information
- Born: July 1, 1998 (age 28) Dumaguete, Negros Oriental, Philippines
- Listed height: 5 ft 11 in (1.80 m)

Career information
- High school: Asian College - Dumaguete
- College: Adamson (2018–2023)
- PBA draft: 2024: 1st round, 9th overall pick
- Drafted by: Magnolia Chicken Timplados Hotshots
- Playing career: 2024–present

Career history
- 2024–present: Magnolia Chicken Timplados Hotshots

Career highlights
- No. 7 retired by the Adamson Soaring Falcons
Medals
Men's basketball
Representing Philippines
SEA Games
Gold medal – first place	2023 Phnom Penh	Team

Jerom Rusiana Lastimosa (born July 1, 1998) is a Filipino professional basketball player for the Magnolia Chicken Timplados Hotshots of the Philippine Basketball Association (PBA). He played college basketball for the Adamson Soaring Falcons of the University Athletic Association of the Philippines (UAAP) from Seasons 81 to 86. He has also played for the Philippines men's national basketball team.

== Early life ==
Lastimosa was born in Dumaguete as the fifth out of six children. His mother is a wet market vendor while his father is a tricycle driver. When he was younger, Lastimosa would play in panalay tournaments. These would be tournaments in which he would play basketball against other amateurs or even ex-pros for an agreed-upon fee, depending on the player's experience and talent level. A scout saw him in the 2017 Unigames (an annual sporting competition for nationwide schools) and recruited him to play for Adamson in Manila. After playing for Asian College - Dumaguete, he committed to Adamson and promised his parents that he would obtain a degree (sports management) in Manila.

== College career ==
=== UAAP Seasons 81–82: Promising seasons ===
Lastimosa first played for the Adamson Soaring Falcons in UAAP Season 81. He started as a backup to Jerie Pingoy. He debuted with six points, three rebounds, and four assists to help Adamson upset the Ateneo Blue Eagles. In their rematch with Ateneo, he led the team with 13 points, but Ateneo won over them. That season, Adamson was second in the standings. He rose to prominence as a player when he converted a clutch triple to force overtime against the UP Fighting Maroons which Adamson survived for a few minutes in the semifinals. However, they lost their twice-to-beat advantage, and UP moved on the Finals.

Lastimosa had more playing time the following season, but still came off the bench for Val Chauca. Against the NU Bulldogs, he had 10 points and the game-winning assist for Lenda Douanga's game-winning three. In a win over the UE Red Warriors, he contributed 16 points, eight rebounds, and six assists. Against UP, he had some turnovers and missed a three with 2.8 seconds left in overtime that led to the Adamson loss. In their rematch against NU, he had an all-around performance of 10 points, nine assists, six rebounds, and four steals. He had a costly offensive foul against UP when he stuck out his leg on a three-ball attempt in their final possession, allowing UP to seal another win over them. They were eliminated from playoff contention in a loss to the FEU Tamaraws. His final averages that season were 8.5 points and 4.1 assists, which was less than what he had expected of himself.

=== Seasons 84–85: Breakout seasons ===
During the COVID-19 pandemic, when there was no UAAP season, Lastimosa stayed in the Adamson dorms and kept in shape by playing pickup basketball with other athletes who had opted to stay in Adamson. He gained the trust of their new head coach Nash Racela and started trusting his own teammates more as well. In his first game of Season 84, he had 18 points, but got into foul trouble as Adamson lost. He made 11 out of his 14 points in the first quarter, including a three-point shot that gave Adamson a commanding 16–2 cushion halfway through the period that they never looked back from. Against the UST Growling Tigers, he had a near double-double of 16 points and nine rebounds, but it wasn't enough as UST took the win. In their game against UP, he had 18 points, six rebounds, and three assists but missed the game-winning three pointer as the Falcons lost their third straight. At the end of the first round, Adamson had a record of 1–6. In their second round match against FEU, he led Adamson with 17 points, eight rebounds, and had the game-winning assist to rookie teammate Matty Erolon, who made the game-winning three. Against NU, he tallied 17 points on an efficient 6-of-8 shooting clip with five rebounds, four assists, a career-high three blocks, and two steals. In their rematch against UP, he hit a clutch three-pointer and two free throws as Adamson got revenge for losing to UP in the first round. He then set a then career-high of 24 points to go with six rebounds, three assists, and three steals. He led all scorers in the league at the end of the two-round elimination that season. He was also in the top five for free throw percentage. The Falcons however, did not make the Final Four.

Despite getting offers from Korean Basketball League (KBL) teams, Lastimosa opted to stay with Adamson for another year. In a win against UE, he had 11 points, seven rebounds, and no turnovers. He dropped a career-high of 29 points when the Soaring Falcons edged the De La Salle Green Archers in an overtime win in the first round of Season 85 on October 22, 2022. In a loss to UP, he had 19 points, three rebounds, three assists and three steals. He didn't finish the game though, as he stepped on the foot of UP guard JD Cagulangan and had to be subbed out of the game. The injury, which was a dislocated right foot, caused him to miss most of their games in the second round. He returned to playing action against UE. In the next game, he made five of his eight threes for 23 points as Adamson kept its playoff hopes. Against NU, he hit a game-winning three-point shot with 5.5 seconds remaining. He was named co-UAAP Player of the Week along with La Salle's Bettina Binaohan, a women's basketball player. In a do-or-die contest for the last spot in the Final Four, he scored 11 straight points in the third quarter to help the Falcons take the lead against the Archers. He then made two clutch free throws with 12 seconds left in the game as Adamson held on for the win, and got their Final Four spot and a matchup with Ateneo. He finished the game with 22 points (on 4-of-10 shooting from three), and six assists. In their Final Four game against Ateneo, Ateneo's defense limited him to just 10 points on 4-of-15 shooting as Ateneo moved on to the Finals, and their season ended.

A UAAP special award—PSBankable Player of the Season—was given to Lastimosa during Season 85 awarding ceremonies on December 14, 2022, after winning four Player of the Game honors.

=== UAAP Season 86: Final season ===
Lastimosa continued to play for the team in his final year in UAAP Season 86. Before the start of the season, his jersey #7 was retired by Adamson, becoming the first Adamson athlete to have that honor.

Lastimosa suffered a partial ACL tear in his left knee in the weeks leading up to the start of UAAP Season 86. This caused him to miss the entire first elimination round of the season. He made his comeback in a game against the UP Fighting Maroons on October 25, 2023, but unfortunately suffered another injury to the same knee just eight minutes into the game. Lastimosa was accidentally hit in the knee by UP's Gerry Abadiano and had to be carried off the court by his teammates. This time, the injury was diagnosed as a full ACL tear. He decided to delay surgery until Adamson's final game of the season. In Adamson's final game of the season, a loss to Ateneo, he ended his collegiate career with a buzzer-beating three-pointer when Ateneo gave away their final possession to give him one more shot. He underwent successful surgery for his torn ACL on December 8, 2023.

== Professional career ==
Lastimosa was drafted by the Magnolia Hotshots with the 9th overall pick of the first round during the PBA season 49 draft. On July 26, 2024, he signed a three-year rookie contract with the team.

After a solid debut game in the Hotshots' convincing win over the Blackwater Bossing in the 2024–25 PBA Commissioner's Cup on November 28, Lastimosa performed his best night of 27 points, eight rebounds, and eight assists in a losing cause against the NorthPort Batang Pier on December 4.

Lastimosa was named MVP of the Blitz Game at the All-Star Weekend held at the Candon City Arena in Ilocos Sur on March 6, 2026, after leading the Rookies and Sophomores Team in beating the Juniors with 27 points, 10 assists, three rebounds, and a steal.

Lastimosa topscored for the Chicken Timplados Hotshots with 28 points in a do-or-die quarterfinals loss against the Meralco Bolts at the Ynares Center in overtime, 102–105, on May 16, 2026.

On August 12, 2026, at the Ynares Center, Lastimosa set a career-high 30 points on 11-out-of-14 shooting as the Hotshots won over the Phoenix Super LPG Fuel Masters.

== PBA career statistics ==
Legend
GP	Games played	MPG	Minutes per game	FG%	Field-goal percentage
3FG%	3-point field-goal percentage	4P%	4-point field-goal percentage	FT%	Free-throw percentage
RPG	Rebounds per game	APG	Assists per game	SPG	Steals per game
BPG	Blocks per game	PPG	Points per game	127	Career high

As of the end of 2025–26 season

=== Season-by-season averages ===
Year	Team	GP	MPG	FG%	3P%	4P%	FT%	RPG	APG	SPG	BPG	PPG
2024–25	Magnolia	27	25.2	.412	.257	.292	.754	3.3	2.8	.7	.3	10.3
2025–26	Magnolia	38	28.4	.518	.364	.167	.763	3.1	4.1	.9	.1	13.8
Career		65	27.0	.476	.315	.250	.760	3.2	3.6	.8	.2	12.3

== International career ==
Having played abroad in several events, the Adamson star set foot in the 12-man Gilas Pilipinas for the 32nd Southeast Asian Games. Coach Chot Reyes used Lastimosa many times as a backup point/shooting guard during the elims and semis.

On May 16, 2023, the national team went up once again against host Cambodia for the gold medal match after ousting defending champion Indonesia, 84–76, behind the heroic efforts of Justin Brownlee, Brandon Ganuelas-Rosser, Arvin Tolentino, and Lastimosa. Against Cambodia, Gilas reclaimed the SEA Games medal.

== Off the court ==
Lastimosa is a brand endorser of Anta Philippines. In 2023, he confirmed that he is in a relationship with UAAP Season 85 FEU correspondent and now PVL courtside reporter Kylla Castillo.
