= Cedrick Manzano =

Filipino basketball player

No. 10 – Quezon Huskers
- Position: Center / power forward
- League: MPBL

Personal information
- Born: March 5, 2003 (age 23) Cajidiocan, Romblon, Philippines
- Listed height: 6 ft 5 in (1.96 m)

Career information
- High school: Hua Siong College of Iloilo (Iloilo City)
- College: Adamson (2022–2025)
- Playing career: 2026–present

Career history
- 2026–present: Quezon Huskers

Career highlights
- MPBL All-Star (2026); AsiaBasket champion (International 2025)

Cedrick R. Manzano (born March 5, 2003), nicknamed "Ced" or "Baby Boy", is a Filipino professional basketball player for the Quezon Huskers of the Maharlika Pilipinas Basketball League (MPBL). He was a member of the Adamson Soaring Falcons who won three playoff spots in the University Athletic Association of the Philippines (UAAP) and Gilas Pilipinas that won gold over host Thailand in the 2025 Southeast Asian Games.

== Early life ==
Initially a Palarong Pambansa volleyball player during elementary school days, Manzano shifted to basketball and played for the Hua Siong College of Iloilo Red Phoenix.

== Collegiate career ==
Manzano and the Adamson Soaring Falcons figured in three straight UAAP Final Four playoffs, winning over the De La Salle Green Archers and the UE Red Warriors under head coach Nash Racela and assistant coach Gilbert Lao from 2022 to 2024.

Three days before facing the defending champs in the semis, Manzano was the Soaring Falcons' best player, with an efficient, double-double performance of 17 points and 10 rebounds in the fourth-seed tiebreaker.

Manzano averaged 9 points, 7 rebounds, 1 assist, and 1 block in UAAP Season 87.

He was the team captain in Season 88.

== Professional career ==
On January 21, 2026, he entered the professional ranks after signing a one-year deal with the Quezon Huskers of the regional Maharlika Pilipinas Basketball League (MPBL).

== National team ==
Manzano was included in the Philippine national team roster for the 2025 SEA Games.

== Personal life ==
On November 21, 2023, Manzano's father died a day before the Ateneo-Adamson playoff which he played nonetheless.

== Awards and recognition ==
- 2025 Gold Medalist, SEA Games
- 2025 Most Valuable Player, Pinoyliga Collegiate Cup Season 4
