= Matty Erolon =

Filipino basketball player (born 2002)

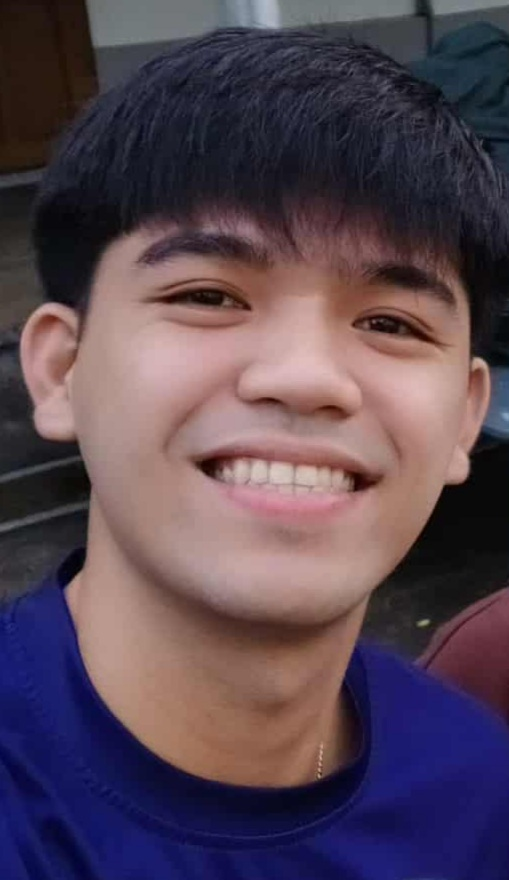

No. 24 – Adamson Soaring Falcons
- Position: Shooting guard
- League: UAAP

Personal information
- Born: June 24, 2002 (age 24) Dumaguete City, Negros Oriental, Philippines
- Listed height: 6 ft 2 in (1.88 m)

Career information
- High school: Adamson (Manila)
- College: Adamson

Career highlights
- AsiaBasket champion (2025 International)

John Mattroven N. Erolon (born June 24, 2002), nicknamed "Matty" or "Matt," is a Filipino college basketball player for the Adamson Soaring Falcons of the University Athletic Association of the Philippines (UAAP).

== High school career ==
Erolon played varsity basketball for the Adamson Baby Falcons.

== College career ==
Erolon opted to continue playing for Adamson when he entered college. He would later team up with Jerom Lastimosa to form a backcourt duo and be added to the shooting guards for the Soaring Falcons.

With the departure of senior teammates, Erolon was asked by Coach Nash Racela to take leadership roles.

The FEU Tamaraws and the UST Growling Tigers suffered setbacks in Seasons 84 and 88 with Erolon's clutch triples.

== Awards and recognition ==
- 2025 Most Valuable Player, Mayor Kirk Asis Open Invitational
