= UAAP Season 88 basketball tournaments =

Basketball season

UAAP Season 88
- "Strength in Motion, Hope in Action"
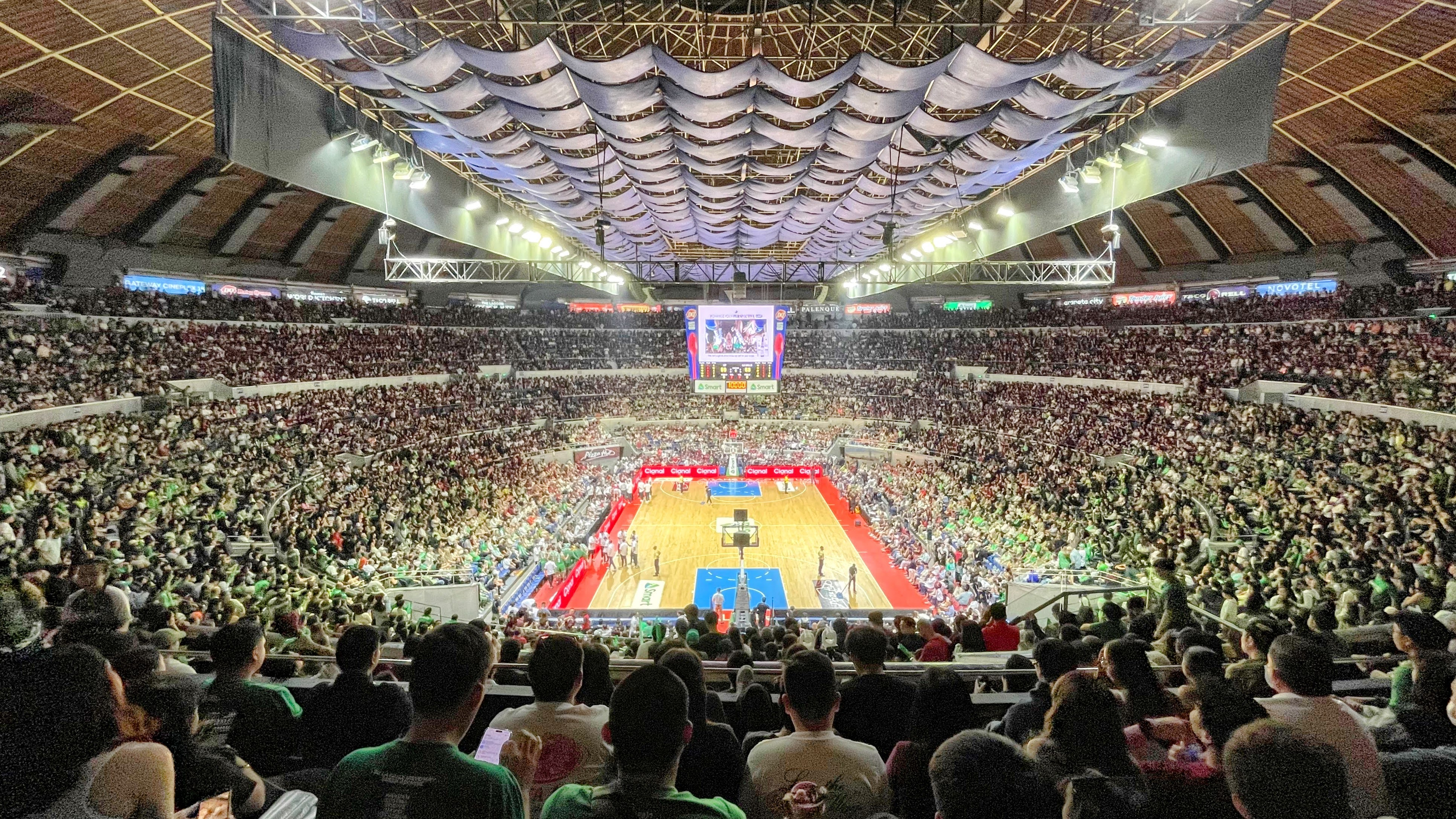
- Game 3 of the men's finals between La Salle and UP
- Host school: University of Santo Tomas
Men's Finals	G1	G2	G3	Wins
UP Fighting Maroons	70	66	72	1
De La Salle Green Archers	74	63	80	2
- Duration: December 10–17, 2025
- Arenas: SM Mall of Asia Arena (Games 1 & 2); Araneta Coliseum (Game 3)
- Finals MVP: Michael Phillips
- Winning coach: Topex Robinson (2nd title)
- Semifinalists: NU Bulldogs; UST Growling Tigers
- TV networks: One Sports; UAAP Varsity Channel
Women's Finals	G1	G2	G3	Wins
UST Growling Tigresses	79	95	79	2
NU Lady Bulldogs	84	70	64	1
- Duration: December 6–14, 2025
- Arenas: Araneta Coliseum (Game 1); SM Mall of Asia Arena (Games 2 & 3)
- Finals MVP: Kent Pastrana
- Winning coach: Haydee Ong (2nd title)
- Semifinalists: Ateneo Blue Eagles; Adamson Lady Falcons
- TV networks: One Sports; UAAP Varsity Channel
Boys' Finals	G1	G2	G3 (OT)	Wins
NUNS Bullpups	73	80	102	1
FEU–D Baby Tamaraws	77	59	106	2
- Duration: March 18–30, 2026
- Arena: Blue Eagle Gym
- Finals MVP: Wilhalm Cabonilas
- Winning coach: Mike Reyes
- Semifinalists: Zobel Junior Archers; Ateneo Blue Eagles
- TV network: UAAP Varsity Channel
Girls' Finals	G1	G2	Wins
UST Junior Tigresses	96	76	2
NUNS Lady Bullpups	87	74	0
- Duration: March 16–22, 2026
- Arena: Blue Eagle Gym
- Finals MVP: Rhiane Perez
- Winning coach: Arsenio Dysangco (2nd title)
- TV network: UAAP Varsity Channel
JHS Finals	G1	G2	Wins
NUNS Bullpups	79	82	2
FEU–D Baby Tamaraws	49	72	0
- Duration: December 6–10, 2025
- Arenas: Araneta Coliseum (Game 1); SM Mall of Asia Arena (Game 2)
- Finals MVP: David Sabareza
- Winning coach: Leo Pujante (1st title)
- Semifinalists: UST Tiger Cubs; Adamson Baby Falcons
- TV network: UAAP Varsity Channel

UAAP Season 88 basketball tournaments are the University Athletic Association of the Philippines (UAAP) basketball tournaments for its 88th season. The University of Santo Tomas (UST) are the season hosts, with the opening ceremony held at the University of Santo Tomas Field on September 19, 2025. The collegiate men's and high school men's tournament started on September 20 while the collegiate women's tournament started on September 24.

== Tournament format ==
Starting this season, the high school division tournaments were rebranded into "16U tournament" from last season's junior high school tournament, while the boys' and girls' tournaments were rebranded into "19U boys' tournament" and "19U girls' tournament", respectively.

The UAAP is expected to use the UAAP Final Four format for tournaments with 7 teams or more. There are five tournaments in two divisions: the collegiate division tournaments and the 16-under tournament of the high school division are being held in the first semester of the academic year. Meanwhile, the 19-under boys' and 19-under girls' tournaments will be held in the second semester.

The under-19 girls' tournament, which only has 4 teams, will see the top two teams qualify to the best-of-three finals.

Former Ateneo varsity player Jai Reyes has been named commissioner, with Jong Uichico as consultant, and Dino Lee, Mikko Abello and Ginny Velarde as deputy commissioners.

The Philippine Basketball Association (PBA) requested the UAAP to allow their players to apply for the PBA season 50 draft while the UAAP season is ongoing. The UAAP rejected the PBA's request, citing the need to consistently apply their eligibility rules across all events, not just men's basketball.

The UAAP rebranded the Mythical Five award (in basketball) as the "Elite Team" across all sports.

== Referee compensation ==
This season, the UAAP introduced a tiered system for compensation for its referees. Referees officiating men's tournaments matches get ₱3,000 per game, ₱2,500 for boys' tournaments matches and ₱2,000 for girls' and women's tournaments matches. In the previous season, referees are paid ₱2,500 per game regardless of tournament. This caused backlash insisting that pay either should be equal or the female tournaments should have not been reduced. Reyes argued that referees in the men's tournaments have to contend with faster pace of play for men's games, justifying higher compensation.

Women's tournaments participants such as coaches and players said that they were offended by the UAAP's actions By October 22, the UAAP's commissioner's office revised the referees' compensation, basing it on the referees' status, instead of the tournament, with pay not based on the sex of the participants of the game that is being officiated.

== Teams ==
Men's basketball is a mandatory event in the UAAP, where all 8 universities are required to field in teams.

The 19-under girls' tournament is a demonstration sport and is not mandatory.

Collegiate division
University	Men		Women		Uniform manufacturer
University	Team	Coach	Team	Coach	Uniform manufacturer
Adamson University (AdU)	Soaring Falcons	(Philippines) Nash Racela	Lady Falcons	(Philippines) Jed Colonia	Anta
Ateneo de Manila University (ADMU (Note: Since 2017, Ateneo de Manila University is the only member school that does not use an acronym for official communications and graphics, according to their branding guide. Third parties still routinely use the "ADMU" acronym to refer to Ateneo such as One Sports and the LaSallian.))	Blue Eagles	(United States) Tab Baldwin	Blue Eagles	(Philippines) LA Mumar	Jordan Brand (Nike)
De La Salle University (DLSU)	Green Archers	(Philippines) Topex Robinson	Lady Archers	(Philippines) Pocholo Villanueva	Nike
Far Eastern University (FEU)	Tamaraws	(United States) Sean Chambers	Lady Tamaraws	(Philippines) Raiza Palmera-Dy	Puma (Men's); Jersey Haven (Women's)
National University (NU)	Bulldogs	(Philippines) Jeff Napa	Lady Bulldogs	(Philippines) D.A. Olan	Adidas
University of the East (UE)	Red Warriors	(Philippines) Chris Gavina	Lady Warriors	(Philippines) Ian Valdez	Anta
University of the Philippines (UP)	Fighting Maroons	(Philippines) Goldwin Monteverde	Fighting Maroons	(Philippines) Paul Ramos	Puma (Men's); Titan 22 (Women's)
University of Santo Tomas (UST)	Growling Tigers	(Philippines) Pido Jarencio	Tigresses	(Philippines) Haydee Ong	Delta Sportswear (Men's); World Balance (Women's)

High school division
High schools	19U Boys/16U			19U Girls	
High schools	Team	Boys' coach	16U coach	Team	Coach
Adamson University (AdU)	Baby Falcons	(Philippines) Mike Fermin	(Philippines) Alex Barerra	—N/a	
Ateneo de Manila University High School (ADMU)	Blue Eagles	(Philippines) Bacon Austria	(Philippines) Ford Arao	Blue Eagles	(Philippines) PJ Navarro
De La Salle Santiago Zobel School (DLSZ)	Junior Archers	(Philippines) Gian Nazario	(Philippines) Penny Laureaga	Junior Lady Archers	(Philippines) Louie Fernandez
Far Eastern University Diliman (FEU-D)	Baby Tamaraws	(Philippines) Mike Reyes	(Philippines) Muriel Garcia	—N/a	
National University Nazareth School (NUNS)	Bullpups	(Philippines) Kevin De Castro	(Philippines) Leo Pujante	Lady Bullpups	(Philippines) Aileen Lebornio
University of the East (UE)	Junior Warriors	(Philippines) Karl Santos	(Philippines) Matthew Sia	—N/a	
University of the Philippines Integrated School (UPIS)	Junior Fighting Maroons	(Philippines) King Vergeire		—N/a	
University of Santo Tomas Senior High School (UST)	Tiger Cubs	(Philippines) Manu Iñigo	(Philippines) Noli Mejos	Junior Tigresses	(Philippines) Arsenio Dysangco

=== Coaching changes ===
Team	Outgoing coach	Manner of departure	Date	Replaced by	Date
UE Red Warriors	(Philippines) Jack Santiago	Mutual consent	January 14, 2025	(Philippines) Chris Gavina	February 13, 2025
UE Lady Warriors	(Philippines) Aileen Lebornio	Mutual consent	January 14, 2025	(Philippines) Ian Valdez	February 13, 2025
NU Lady Bulldogs	(Philippines) Aris Dimaunahan	Mutual consent	July 31, 2025	(Philippines) D.A. Olan	July 31, 2025
Adamson Lady Falcons	(Philippines) Ryan Monteclaro	Replaced	July 8, 2025	(Philippines) Jed Colonia	August 23, 2025
UE Junior Warriors (16U)	(Philippines) Andrew Estrella	Signed by Letran Squires	July 4, 2025	(Philippines) Matthew Sia	September 18, 2025

== Venues ==
Venues in Metro Manila

The University of Santo Tomas Field in Manila hosted the opening ceremonies. The main venues for the basketball tournament are the SM Mall of Asia Arena in Pasay City and Smart Araneta Coliseum in Quezon City. Due to Metro Manila hosting the 2025 FIVB Men's Volleyball World Championship, several venues are unavailable during the first week, forcing UST to host games at the on-campus Quadricentennial Pavilion.

The UAAP's return to the newly-renovated Blue Eagle Gym is its first after 20 years for the men's tournament and 6 years for the women's tournament.

Arena	Location	Tournament					Capacity
Arena	Location	M	W	B	G	16U	Capacity
Araneta Coliseum	Quezon City	check	check			check	14,429
Blue Eagle Gym (BEG)	Quezon City	check	check	check	check	check	7,500
Filoil EcoOil Centre	San Juan			check	check		6,000
Quadricentennial Pavilion (QPav)	Manila	check	check			check	5,792
SM Mall of Asia Arena (MOA)	Pasay	check	check			check	15,000

== Squads ==
Each team has a roster of up to 16 players. Only one "foreign student-athlete", non-Filipinos who are otherwise known as "imports" elsewhere, is allowed to be on the active roster.

Starting next season, the UAAP will allow up to two imports in their pool, with still one allowed on the active roster, while another is available on the reserve list. The change is to provide teams with "roster security".

Men's squads
Adamson	Ateneo	La Salle	FEU	NU	UE	UP	UST
(Philippines) Mathew Montebon	(Nigeria) Divine Adili	(Philippines) Earl Abadam	(Philippines) Jorick Bautista	(Philippines) Steve Nash Enriquez	(Philippines) Nicolo Mulingtapang	(Philippines) Gerry Abadiano	(Philippines) Leonardo Acido
(Philippines) John Erolon	(Philippines) Jared Bahay	(Philippines) Mason Amos	(The Gambia) Mohamed Konateh	(Philippines) Jake Figueroa	(Philippines) Reynaldo Malaga III	(Philippines) Harold Alarcon	(Nigeria) Collins Akowe
(Philippines) Cedrick Manzano	(Philippines) Andrew Bongo	(Philippines) Kean Baclaan	(Philippines) Janrey Pasaol	(Philippines) Jolo Manansala	(Philippines) Nurjadden Datumalim	(Philippines) LA Andres	(Philippines) Lorenzo Bangco
(Philippines) Emmanuel Anabo	(Philippines) Alden Cainglet	(Philippines) Jacob Cortez	(Philippines) Jedric Daa	(Philippines) PJ Palacielo	(Philippines) Drayton Caoile	(Philippines) Sean Alter	(Philippines) Charles Bucsit
(Philippines) Joshua Barcelona	(Philippines) Romeo Ebdane III	(Philippines) Lebron Daep	(Philippines) Miguel Ona	(Senegal) Omar John	(Philippines) Cole Cruz-Dumont	(Philippines) Jacob Bayla	(Philippines) Koji Buenaflor
(Philippines) Kenjo Canete	(Philippines) Dominic Escobar	(Philippines) Denzel Dagdag	(Philippines) Aeron Bagunu	(Philippines) Kenshin Padrones	(Philippines) Dylan Despi	(Philippines) Mark Belmonte	(Philippines) Nicael Cabañero
(Philippines) Henjz Demisana	(Philippines) Waki Espina	(Philippines) Doy Dungo	(Philippines) Rojan Montemayor	(Philippines) Reinhard Jumamoy	(Philippines) Jax Distrito	(Philippines) Chicco Briones	(Philippines) Bevir Calum
(Philippines) AJ Fransman	(Philippines) Ian Espinosa	(Philippines) Gian Gomez	(Philippines) Luke Felipe	(Philippines) Tebol Garcia	(Philippines) Jhondrew Jimenez	(Philippines) Joshua Coronel	(Philippines) Gelo Crisostomo
(Philippines) Joaqin Jaymalin	(Philippines) Lars Fjellavang	(Philippines) EJ Gollena	(Philippines) Adam Nakai	(Philippines) Vince Reyes	(Philippines) John Abate	(Philippines) Terrence Fortea	(Philippines) Isaac Danting
(Philippines) John Earl Medina	(Philippines) Kyle Gamber	(Philippines) Vhoris Marasigan	(Philippines) Jayden Jones	(Philippines) Munmun dela Cruz	(Philippines) Kristopher Lagat	(Nigeria) Francis Nnoruka	(Philippines) Leland Estacio
(Nigeria) Mudiaga Ojarikre	(Philippines) Joshua Lazaro	(Philippines) Rhyle Melencio	(Philippines) Nick Duque	(Philippines) Paul Francisco	(Philippines) Wello Lingolingo	(Philippines) Miguel Palanca	(Philippines) Joachim Laure
(Philippines) Louis Allen Perez	(Philippines) Jaden Lazo	(Nigeria) Bright Nwankwo	(Philippines) Aicen Macapagal	(Philippines) Gelo Santiago	(Philippines) Mark Cabero	(Philippines) Rey Remogat	(Philippines) Carl Manding
(Philippines) Austin Ronzone	(Philippines) Lebron Nieto	(Philippines) Luis Pablo	(Philippines) Kirby Mongcopa	(Philippines) Jedric Solomon	(Nigeria) Precious Momowei	(Philippines) Gani Stevens	(Philippines) Mark Llemit
(Philippines) Cade Ronzone	(Philippines) Kyle Ong	(Philippines) Michael Phillips	(Philippines) Liam Salangsang	(Philippines) Nat Tulabut	(Philippines) Daryll Robles	(Philippines) Reyland Torres	(Philippines) Forthsky Padrigao
(Philippines) Ray Allen Torres	(Philippines) Shawn Tuano	(Philippines) Guillian Quines	(Philippines) CJ Amos	(Philippines) Mark Parks	(Philippines) Reymark Rosete	(Philippines) Ernest Felicilda	(Philippines) Kyle Paranada
(Philippines) Jireh Tumaneng		(Philippines) JC Macalalag	(Philippines) Neil Owens	(Philippines) Jolo Navarro	(Philippines) Mariano Tanedo	(Philippines) Miguel Yniguez	(Philippines) Jiro Sevilla

Women's squads
Adamson	Ateneo	La Salle	FEU	NU	UE	UP	UST
(Nigeria) Oluwakemi Adeshina	(Philippines) Kacey dela Rosa	(Philippines) Paulina Anastacio	(Philippines) Maxine dela Torre	(Philippines) Cielo Pagdulagan	(Philippines) Kezza Buscar	(Philippines) Alliyah Castro	(Philippines) Rachelle Ambos
(Philippines) Charlene Carcallas	(Philippines) Sandra Villacruz	(Philippines) Stephanie Villapando	(Philippines) Lorelie Gavaran	(Philippines) Margarett Villanueva	(Philippines) Kristine Dalguntas	(Philippines) Kaye Pesquera	(Philippines) Agatha Bron
(Philippines) Crisnalyn Padilla	(Philippines) Grace Batongbakal	(Philippines) Elizabeth delos Reyes	(Philippines) Elaine Patio	(Philippines) Daniella Alterado	(Philippines) Princess Delig	(Philippines) Shanina Tapawan	(Philippines) Barby Dajao
(Philippines) Elaine Etang	(Philippines) Monique Fetalvero	(Philippines) Mica Camba	(Philippines) Erica Lopez	(Philippines) Karl Pingol	(Philippines) Kayla Gomez	(Philippines) Bjeanx Barba	(Philippines) Erika Danganan
(Philippines) Angela Alaba	(Philippines) Rishelle Olivenza	(Philippines) Sofia Catalan	(Philippines) Julienne Manguiat	(Philippines) Aloha Betanio	(Philippines) Mhariko Gullim	(Philippines) Ahcrissa Maw	(Philippines) Nicole Danganan
(Philippines) Jamanah Meniano	(Philippines) Erica de Luna	(Philippines) Luisa dela Paz	(Philippines) Vvette Villanueva	(Philippines) Marylene Solis	(Philippines) Rachel Lacayanga	(Philippines) Louna Ozar	(Philippines) Vergen Maglupay
(Philippines) Hazel Mazo	(Philippines) Kate Cancio	(Philippines) Aiesha Dizon	(Philippines) Joann Nagma	(Philippines) Angela Garcia	(Philippines) Heaven Lituania	(Philippines) Danielle Santos	(Philippines) Erinn McAlary
(Philippines) Brianna Bajo	(Philippines) Gwen Chan	(Philippines) Edel Araza	(Philippines) Victoria Pasilang	(Philippines) Angelica Surada	(Philippines) Roshelle Lumibao	(Philippines) Trisha Catequista	(Nigeria) Isioma Onianwa
(Philippines) Novie Ornopia	(Philippines) Sophia Cruza	(Philippines) Shantei Dizon	(Philippines) Shane Salvani	(Philippines) Kristine Cayabyab	(Philippines) Sybil Onate	(Philippines) Camille Nolasco	(Philippines) Kent Pastrana
(Philippines) Zyryll Cortez	(Philippines) Hannah Lopez	(Philippines) Devina Go	(Philippines) Amyah Espanol	(Philippines) Nicole Pring	(Philippines) Jean Ramos	(Philippines) Rebekkah Pascua	(Philippines) Ayesha Pescador
(Philippines) Kemberly Limbago	(Philippines) Kailah Oani	(Philippines) Razzyla Lubrico	(Philippines) Allison Casais	(Philippines) Sophia Canindo	(Philippines) Rizza Salise	(Philippines) Marielle Vingno	(Philippines) Breana Pineda
(Philippines) Nadine Munoz	(Philippines) Lauren Lopez	(Philippines) Patricia Mendoza	(Philippines) Shane Agcambot	(Philippines) Samantha Medina	(Philippines) Aicel Solomon	(Philippines) Shane Cunanan	(Philippines) Gin Relliquette
(Philippines) Niclen Manlimos	(Philippines) Camille Malagar	(Nigeria) Jimoh Nosifat	(Philippines) Shemaiah Abatayo	(Philippines) Ellaine Medina	(Philippines) Ashley Trinidad	(Philippines) Cris Mejasco	(Philippines) Bridgette Santos
(Philippines) Cheska Apag	(Nigeria) Sarah Makanjoula	(Philippines) Aleigha Salado	(Philippines) Rea Fe Ong	(Philippines) Gheralyn Ico	(Philippines) Moana Vacalarez	(Philippines) Rachel Evangelista	(Philippines) Chille Serrano
		(Philippines) Kyla Sunga			(Philippines) Ivy Yanez	(Philippines) Rhea Solitario	(Philippines) Karylle Sierba
		(Philippines) Princess Villarin				(Philippines) Alexandra Mendoza	(Philippines) Angelika Soriano

== Men's tournament ==
The tournament began on September 20, 2025 with Ateneo defeating FEU in overtime, and ended on December 17, 2025.

=== Elimination round ===
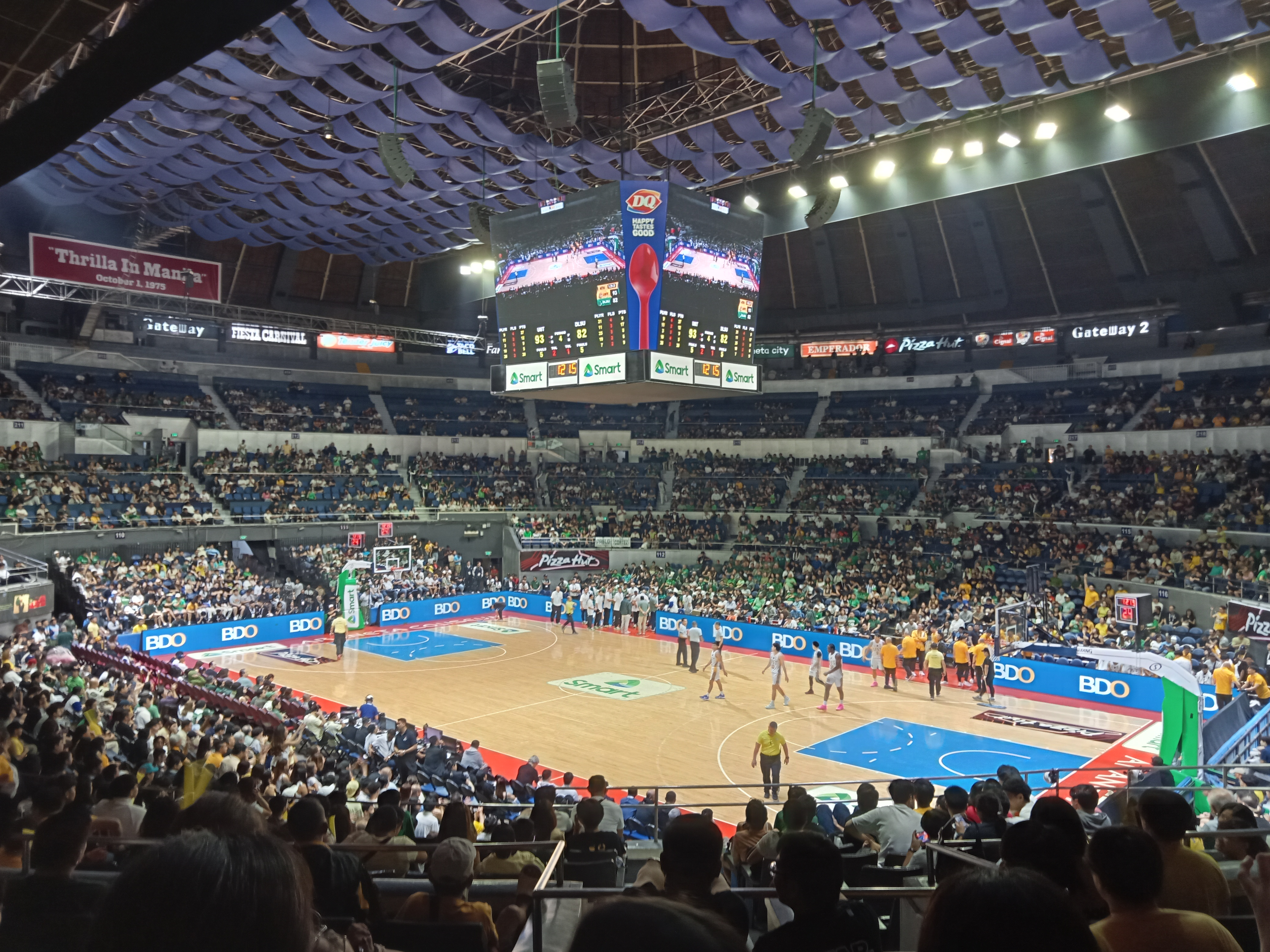
First round game between UST and La Salle at the Araneta Coliseum

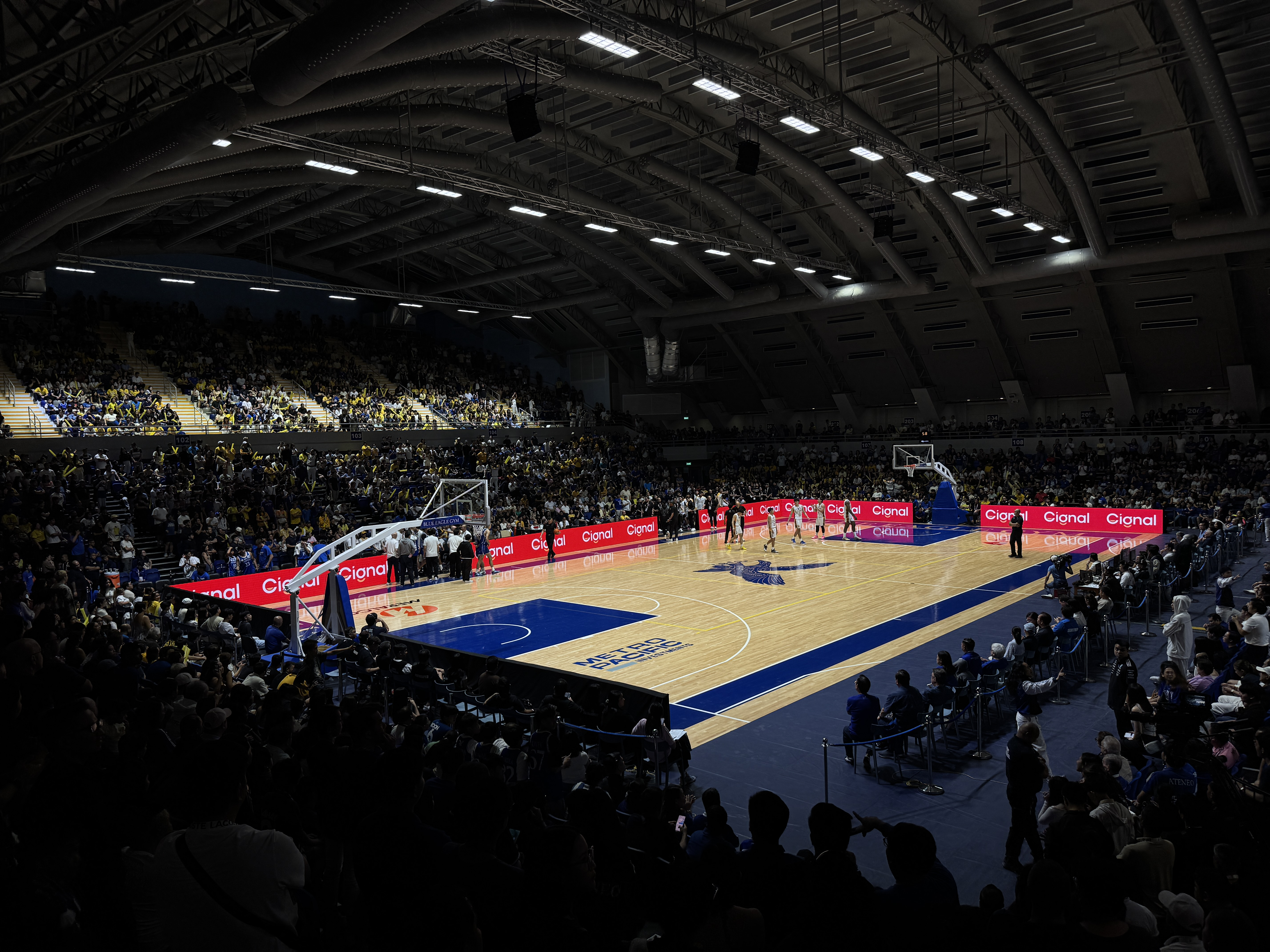
First round game between Ateneo and UST at the Blue Eagle Gym

The UAAP postponed the November 9 games due to the predicted effects of Typhoon Uwan (Fung-wong).The games were rescheduled on November 26.

==== Team standings ====
Pos	Team	W	L	PCT	GB	Qualification
1	NU Bulldogs	11	3	.786	—	Twice-to-beat in the semifinals
2	UP Fighting Maroons	10	4	.714	1	Twice-to-beat in the semifinals
3	UST Growling Tigers (H)	8	6	.571 (Note: Head-to-head record: La Salle 1–1 UST (0 point differential); overall point differential: UST +61, La Salle +10)	3	Twice-to-win in the semifinals
4	De La Salle Green Archers	8	6	.571	3	Twice-to-win in the semifinals
5	FEU Tamaraws	7	7	.500	4	
6	Ateneo Blue Eagles	6	8	.429 (Note: Head-to-head record: Ateneo 2–0 Adamson)	5	
7	Adamson Soaring Falcons	6	8	.429	5	
8	UE Red Warriors	0	14	.000	11	

Source: Rappler
Rules for classification: 1) winning percentage; 2) if tied for #2 or #4, one-game playoff; 3) head-to-head record; 4) head-to-head point differential; 5) overall point differential:
(H) Hosts

==== Match-up results ====
	Round 1							Round 2						
Team ╲ Game	1	2	3	4	5	6	7	8	9	10	11	12	13	14
Adamson	La Salle school colors	UP school colors	Ateneo school colors	FEU school colors	NU school colors	UE school colors	UST school colors	UE school colors	UST school colors	FEU school colors	NU school colors	UP school colors	La Salle school colors	Ateneo school colors
Ateneo	FEU school colors	UE school colors	Adamson school colors	La Salle school colors	UP school colors	UST school colors	NU school colors	FEU school colors	NU school colors	UE school colors	UST school colors	UP school colors	Adamson school colors	La Salle school colors
La Salle	Adamson school colors	UST school colors	FEU school colors	Ateneo school colors	NU school colors	UE school colors	UP school colors	UST school colors	UE school colors	NU school colors	FEU school colors	Adamson school colors	UP school colors	Ateneo school colors
FEU	Ateneo school colors	NU school colors	La Salle school colors	Adamson school colors	UP school colors	UST school colors	UE school colors	Ateneo school colors	UP school colors	Adamson school colors	NU school colors	La Salle school colors	UE school colors	UST school colors
NU	UE school colors	FEU school colors	UST school colors	UP school colors	Adamson school colors	La Salle school colors	Ateneo school colors	UP school colors	Ateneo school colors	La Salle school colors	Adamson school colors	FEU school colors	UE school colors	UST school colors
UE	NU school colors	Ateneo school colors	UP school colors	UST school colors	Adamson school colors	La Salle school colors	FEU school colors	Adamson school colors	La Salle school colors	Ateneo school colors	UP school colors	UST school colors	NU school colors	FEU school colors
UP	UST school colors	Adamson school colors	UE school colors	NU school colors	Ateneo school colors	FEU school colors	La Salle school colors	NU school colors	FEU school colors	UST school colors	UE school colors	Adamson school colors	Ateneo school colors	La Salle school colors
UST	UP school colors	La Salle school colors	NU school colors	UE school colors	Ateneo school colors	FEU school colors	Adamson school colors	La Salle school colors	Adamson school colors	UP school colors	UE school colors	Ateneo school colors	NU school colors	FEU school colors

Source: UAAP on Livestats
= Win; = OT win; = Loss; = OT loss

==== Scores ====
Results on top and to the right of the grey cells are for first-round games; those to the bottom and to the left are second-round games.

Teams	AdU	ADMU	DLSU	FEU	NU	UE	UP	UST
Adamson Soaring Falcons		58–77	58–60	58–64	54–56	77–62	62–59	69–59
Ateneo Blue Eagles	72–61		81–74	86–83*	66–71*	62–60	69–83	89–98***
De La Salle Green Archers	60–61	78–72		74–72	78–82	111–110*	72–69	84–93
FEU Tamaraws	73–70*	75–68	84–83		68–84	95–76	66–69	80–92
NU Bulldogs	66–65	66–50	75–67	70–64		72–57	59–66	76–69
UE Red Warriors	53–56	74–78	72–84	77–84	74–83		75–92	99–111
UP Fighting Maroons	70–65	79–75	72–77	89–75	78–74	70–61		67–87
UST Growling Tigers	96–97*	67–59	77–86	79–81	80–71	109–97	88–89	

Source: UAAP on Livestats
Legend: Blue = left column team win; Red = top row team win.
Matches with lighter background shading were decided after overtime.

=== Bracket ===
Semifinals (Top 2 twice-to-beat)
1	NU	77	73
4	La Salle	87	78
2	UP	82
3	UST	81

Finals (Best-of-three playoff)
4	La Salle	74	63	80
2	UP	70	66	72

=== Semifinals ===
The top two seeds have the twice-to-beat advantage where they have to win just once, while their opponents twice, to progress.

==== (1) NU vs. (4) La Salle ====
The NU Bulldogs become the first team to clinch a semifinals berth after their victory against Adamson. They then clinched the twice-to-beat advantage with their win against UE. UP's loss to La Salle gave the #1 seed to NU. La Salle's elimination round finale win against Ateneo gave them the #4 seed.

One Sports, UAAP Varsity Channel

December 3, 2025
1:30 p.m.

NU Bulldogs	77–87	De La Salle Green Archers
Scoring by quarter: 17–28, 29–20, 8–19, 23–20
Pts: Jake Figueroa 20; Rebs: Jake Figueroa 10; Asts: Reinhard Jumamoy 5		Pts: Jacob Cortez 13; Rebs: Mike Phillips 17; Asts: Cortez, Abadam 4

Araneta Coliseum, Quezon City
Referees: A. Regino, G. Alap, J. Garcia

One Sports, UAAP Varsity Channel

December 6, 2025
3:30 p.m.

NU Bulldogs	73–78	De La Salle Green Archers
Scoring by quarter: 20–14, 16–16, 18–23, 19–25
Pts: Jake Figueroa 21; Rebs: Omar John 7 Asts: Jake Figueroa 5		Pts: Jacob Cortez 29; Rebs: Phillips, Pablo 10; Asts: Phillips,Cortez 4
La Salle wins series in two games

Araneta Coliseum, Quezon City
Referees: R. Moreto, G. Cornelio, A. Canete

==== (2) UP vs. (3) UST ====
The UP Fighting Maroons clinched the semifinal berth after winning against Adamson. With UP's loss to La Salle, they settled for the #2 seed. The UST Growling Tigers clinched a Final Four berth after winning against top-seeded NU. UST clinched the #3 seed after La Salle's defeat of Ateneo in the elimination round finale.

One Sports, UAAP Varsity Channel

December 3, 2025
4:30 p.m.

UP Fighting Maroons	82–81	UST Growling Tigers
Scoring by quarter: 19–11, 24–25, 22–26, 17–19
Pts: Harold Alarcon 22; Rebs: Francis Nnoruka 9 Asts: Terrence Fortea 6		Pts: Nic Cabañero 24; Rebs: Collins Akowe 11; Asts: Collins Akowe 6
UP wins series in one game

Araneta Coliseum, Quezon City
Referees: J. Talledo, G. Cornelio, N. Cortez

=== Finals ===
The finals is a best-of-three playoff.

The UP Fighting Maroons clinched their fifth consecutive Finals berth after winning against UST. Meanwhile, the De La Salle Green Archers clinched their third consecutive Finals berth. This is the third consecutive time La Salle and UP met in the finals.

One Sports, UAAP Varsity Channel

December 10, 2025
4:00 p.m.

UP Fighting Maroons	70–74	De La Salle Green Archers
Scoring by quarter: 24–25, 12–8, 22–20, 12–21
Pts: Harold Alarcon 34; Rebs: Three Players 6 Asts: Rey Remogat 4		Pts: Jacob Cortez 21; Rebs: Mike Phillips 9 Asts: Kean Baclaan 6

SM Mall of Asia Arena, Pasay
Attendance: 18,210
Referees: R. Moreto, J. Talledo, J. Garcia

One Sports, UAAP Varsity Channel

December 14, 2025
4:00 p.m.

UP Fighting Maroons	66–63	De La Salle Green Archers
Scoring by quarter: 13–20, 22–13, 14–14, 17–16
Pts: Gerry Abadiano 17; Rebs: Francis Nnoruka 13; Asts: Harold Alarcon 5		Pts: Jacob Cortez 16; Rebs: Mike Phillips 14; Asts: Pablo, Marasigan 2

SM Mall of Asia Arena, Pasay
Attendance: 22,412
Referees: J. Celeste, G. Cornelio, N. Cortez

One Sports, UAAP Varsity Channel

December 17, 2025
4:00 p.m.

UP Fighting Maroons	72–80	De La Salle Green Archers
Scoring by quarter: 16–19, 25–21, 18–18, 13–22
Pts: Rey Remogat 21; Rebs: Francis Nnoruka 15; Asts: Jacob Bayla 4		Pts: Mike Phillips 25; Rebs: Mike Phillips 18; Asts: Jacob Cortez 5
La Salle wins series, 2–1

Araneta Coliseum, Quezon City
Attendance: 24,339

- Finals Most Valuable Player: Mike Phillips (De La Salle Green Archers)

La Salle won against UP to claim the championship. It was the first time since 2014 that a team has won a championship from being the lowest seed in the elimination round, 4th.

=== Awards ===
UAAP Season 88 men's basketball champions
De La Salle Green Archers
11th title

The end-of-season awards were handed out prior to game 2 of the finals at the SM Mall of Asia Arena.

- Most Valuable Player: Janrey Pasaol (FEU Tamaraws)
- Rookie of the Year: Collins Akowe (UST Growling Tigers)
- Elite Team:
  - Janrey Pasaol (FEU Tamaraws)
  - Mike Phillips (De La Salle Green Archers)
  - Collins Akowe (UST Growling Tigers)
  - Jake Figueroa (NU Bulldogs)
  - Nic Cabanero (UST Growling Tigers)

==== Player of the Week ====
The Collegiate Press Corps awards a "player of the week" throughout the season:

Week	Player	Team
Week 1	(Nigeria) Collins Akowe	UST Growling Tigers
Week 2	(The Gambia) Mohamed Konateh	FEU Tamaraws
Week 3	(Philippines) Gelo Crisostomo	UST Growling Tigers
Week 4	(Philippines) Jacob Cortez	De La Salle Green Archers
Week 5	(Philippines) Jake Figueroa	NU Bulldogs
Week 6	(Philippines) Kirby Mongcopa	FEU Tamaraws
Week 7	(Philippines) Jake Figueroa	NU Bulldogs
Week 8	(Philippines) Jacob Cortez	De La Salle Green Archers

=== Statistical leaders ===
FEU's Janrey Pasaol topped the statistical points race after the elimination round.

==== Statistical points leaders ====
#	Player	Team	SP
1	(Philippines) Janrey Pasaol	FEU Tamaraws	81.5
2	(Philippines) Mike Phillips	De La Salle Green Archers	80.429
3	(Nigeria) Collins Akowe	UST Growling Tigers	79.286
4	(Philippines) Jake Figueroa	NU Bulldogs	77.286
5	(Nigeria) Precious Momowei	UE Red Warriors	75.214

==== Season player highs ====
Statistic	Player	Team	Average
Points per game	(Philippines) Nic Cabanero	UST Growling Tigers	16.79
Points per game	(Nigeria) Precious Momowei	UE Red Warriors	16.79
Rebounds per game	(Philippines) Mike Philips	De La Salle Green Archers	14.93
Assists per game	(Philippines) Janrey Pasaol	FEU Tamaraws	7.5
Steals per game	(Philippines) Janrey Pasaol	FEU Tamaraws	2.14
Blocks per game	(The Gambia) Mohamed Konateh	FEU Tamaraws	2.07
Field goal percentage	(Nigeria) Collins Akowe	UST Growling Tigers	54.42%
Three-point field goal percentage	(Philippines) Paul Francisco	NU Bulldogs	44.44%
Free throw percentage	(Philippines) Wello Lingolingo	UE Red Warriors	88.1%
Turnovers per game	(Nigeria) Precious Momowei	UE Red Warriors	3.71

==== Game player highs ====
Statistic	Player	Team	Total	Opponent
Points	(Nigeria) Precious Momowei	UE Red Warriors	42 (Note: Game went into overtime)	De La Salle Green Archers
Points	(Nigeria) Collins Akowe	UST Growling Tigers	29	UP Fighting Maroons
Rebounds	(The Gambia) Mohamed Konateh	FEU Tamaraws	23	Ateneo Blue Eagles
Rebounds	(The Gambia) Mohamed Konateh	FEU Tamaraws	21	Adamson Soaring Falcons
Assists	(Philippines) Janrey Pasaol	FEU Tamaraws	13	Ateneo Blue Eagles
Steals	(Philippines) Forthsky Padrigao	UST Growling Tigers	6	UE Red Warriors
Steals	(Philippines) Jake Figueroa	NU Bulldogs	6	De La Salle Green Archers
Blocks	11 instances	various	4	various
Turnovers	4 instances	various	7	various

==== Season team highs ====
Category	Team	Average
Points per game	UST Growling Tigers	86.07
Rebounds per game	UST Growling Tigers	48.07
Assists per game	FEU Tamaraws	17.5
Steals per game	NU Bulldogs	9.0
Blocks per game	FEU Tamaraws	4.36
Field goal percentage	NU Bulldogs	42.91%
Three point field goal percentage	NU Bulldogs	32.64%
Free throw percentage	Adamson Soaring Falcons	67.47%
Turnovers per game	NU Bulldogs	16.14

==== Game team highs ====
Statistic	Team	Total	Opponent
Points	De La Salle Green Archers	111	UE Red Warriors
Points	UST Growling Tigers	111	UE Red Warriors
Rebounds	UST Growling Tigers	76	Ateneo Blue Eagles
Rebounds	UP Fighting Maroons	55	UE Red Warriors
Assists	UP Fighting Maroons	27	UE Red Warriors
Steals	UST Growling Tigers	17	FEU Tamaraws
Blocks	UST Growling Tigers	8	Ateneo Blue Eagles
Blocks	7 instances	7	various
Field goal percentage	NU Bulldogs	55.0%	De La Salle Green Archers
Three-point field goal percentage	NU Bulldogs	50.0%	De La Salle Green Archers
Free throw percentage	Adamson Soaring Falcons	94.0%	UST Growling Tigers
Turnovers	NU Bulldogs	22	De La Salle Green Archers
Turnovers	Adamson Soaring Falcons	22	Ateneo Blue Eagles

=== Discipline ===
- The referees of the Adamson vs. UP first round game were suspended for three game days after they allowed Adamson to play with four players, one less the required five, for twenty seconds late in the fourth quarter.
- Wello Lingolingo of UE was suspended for 3 games after incurring an unsportsmanlike foul against La Salle's Kean Baclaan. Lingolingo served out UE's first round game with FEU, and the first two games of the second round.
- Coach Chris Gavina of UE was suspended for 4 games after an expletive-ridden rant on the postgame press conference after their loss against La Salle. Gavina served out UE's first round game with FEU, and the first three games of the second round. RJ Argamino coached UE against FEU, and on the rest of the games Gavina was suspended.
- Gelo Santiago of NU was suspended for 5 games after incurring a disqualifying foul against Ateneo's Waki Espina. Santiago served out his suspension against La Salle, Adamson, FEU, UE, and UST.
- Vhoris Marasigan of La Salle was suspended for 1 game after incurring a disqualifying foul against NU's Omar John. Marasigan will supposedly serve his suspension against Ateneo, but with the postponement of that game, he served out his suspension on their game against FEU.
- EJ Gollena of La Salle was suspended for 1 game after incurring a disqualifying foul against UP's Francis Nnoruka. Gollena will serve his suspension against Ateneo.

== Women's tournament ==
The tournament started on September 24 with UP winning over Adamson. And ended on December 14, 2025.

=== Elimination round ===
The UAAP postponed the November 9 games due to the predicted effects of Typhoon Uwan (Fung-wong). These games were then rescheduled to November 26.

==== Team standings ====
Pos	Team	W	L	PCT	GB	Qualification
1	UST Growling Tigresses (H)	14	0	1.000	—	Advance to the Finals (Note: As UST won all of their elimination round games, the stepladder format was used instead of the regular Final Four format.)
2	NU Lady Bulldogs	12	2	.857	2	Advance to stepladder semifinal
3	Ateneo Blue Eagles	8	6	.571	6	Proceed to stepladder quarterfinal
4	Adamson Lady Falcons	7	7	.500	7	Proceed to stepladder quarterfinal
5	FEU Lady Tamaraws	6	8	.429	8	
6	De La Salle Lady Archers	6	8	.429	8	
7	UP Fighting Maroons	3	11	.214	11	
8	UE Lady Warriors	0	14	.000	14	

Source: Rappler
Rules for classification: 1) winning percentage; 2) if tied for #2 or #4, one-game playoff; 3) head-to-head record; 4) head-to-head
(H) Hosts

==== Match-up results ====
	Round 1							Round 2						
Team ╲ Game	1	2	3	4	5	6	7	8	9	10	11	12	13	14
Adamson	UP school colors	Ateneo school colors	FEU school colors	NU school colors	UE school colors	UST school colors	La Salle school colors	UE school colors	UST school colors	FEU school colors	NU school colors	UP school colors	La Salle school colors	Ateneo school colors
Ateneo	UE school colors	Adamson school colors	La Salle school colors	UP school colors	UST school colors	NU school colors	FEU school colors	NU school colors	FEU school colors	UE school colors	UST school colors	UP school colors	Adamson school colors	La Salle school colors
La Salle	UST school colors	FEU school colors	Ateneo school colors	NU school colors	UE school colors	UP school colors	Adamson school colors	UST school colors	UE school colors	NU school colors	FEU school colors	Adamson school colors	UP school colors	Ateneo school colors
FEU	NU school colors	La Salle school colors	Adamson school colors	UP school colors	UST school colors	UE school colors	Ateneo school colors	UP school colors	Ateneo school colors	Adamson school colors	NU school colors	La Salle school colors	UE school colors	UST school colors
NU	FEU school colors	UST school colors	UP school colors	Adamson school colors	La Salle school colors	Ateneo school colors	UE school colors	Ateneo school colors	UP school colors	La Salle school colors	Adamson school colors	FEU school colors	UE school colors	UST school colors
UE	Ateneo school colors	UP school colors	UST school colors	Adamson school colors	La Salle school colors	FEU school colors	NU school colors	Adamson school colors	La Salle school colors	Ateneo school colors	UP school colors	UST school colors	NU school colors	FEU school colors
UP	Adamson school colors	UE school colors	NU school colors	Ateneo school colors	FEU school colors	La Salle school colors	UST school colors	FEU school colors	NU school colors	UST school colors	UE school colors	Adamson school colors	Ateneo school colors	La Salle school colors
UST	La Salle school colors	NU school colors	UE school colors	Ateneo school colors	FEU school colors	Adamson school colors	UP school colors	La Salle school colors	Adamson school colors	UP school colors	UE school colors	Ateneo school colors	NU school colors	FEU school colors

Source: UAAP on Livestats
= Win; = OT win; = Loss; = OT loss

==== Scores ====
Results on top and to the right of the grey cells are for first-round games; those to the bottom and to the left are second-round games.

Teams	AdU	ADMU	DLSU	FEU	NU	UE	UP	UST
Adamson Lady Falcons		60–70	52–53	57–56	51–69	54–43	63–66	55–79
Ateneo Blue Eagles	71–77		77–58	84–77	79–83	81–52	78–65	66–75
De La Salle Lady Archers	70–78	73–72		72–73	68–86	73–62	88–59	56–105
FEU Lady Tamaraws	39–67	70–82	64–62		64–89	81–59	94–66	66–104
NU Lady Bulldogs	86–57	69–47	97–67	95–63		84–53	95–58	62–76
UE Lady Warriors	49–75	57–81	72–82	53–70	48–81		75–84*	42–99
UP Fighting Maroons	65–69	68–94	73–75	75–79	61–82	81–67		61–75
UST Growling Tigresses	95–66	92–79	94–50	101–84	105–85	125–50	104–54	

Source: UAAP on Livestats
Legend: Blue = left column team win; Red = top row team win.
Matches with lighter background shading were decided after overtime.

=== Bracket ===
Stepladder quarterfinal (Single-elimination)
3	Ateneo	66
4	Adamson	56

Stepladder semifinal (Single-elimination)
2	NU	67
3	Ateneo	66

Finals (Best-of-three playoff)
1	UST	79	95	79
2	NU	84	70	64

=== Stepladder playoffs ===
==== (3) Ateneo vs. (4) Adamson ====
Adamson and Ateneo qualified to the stepladder semifinals.

One Sports, UAAP Varsity Channel

November 30, 2025
10:30 a.m.

Ateneo Blue Eagles	66–56	Adamson Lady Falcons
Scoring by quarter: 20–14, 12–17, 22–17, 12–8
Pts: Kacey dela Rosa 17; Rebs: Kacey dela Rosa 20; Asts: Sarah Makanjoula 5		Pts: Elaine Etang 18; Rebs: Oluwakemi Adeshina 9 Asts: Elaine Etang 6
Ateneo advances to the stepladder round 2

SM Mall of Asia Arena, Pasay

==== (2) NU vs. (3) Ateneo ====
NU awaits the winner of Ateneo vs. Adamson playoff.

One Sports, UAAP Varsity Channel

December 3, 2025
10:30 a.m.

NU Lady Bulldogs	67–66	Ateneo Blue Eagles
Scoring by quarter: 12–12, 22–24, 14–13, 19–17
Pts: Marga Villanueva 16; Rebs: Angel Surada 8 Asts: Aloha Betanio 8		Pts: dela Rosa, Malagar 18; Rebs: Kacey dela Rosa 22; Asts: Kacey dela Rosa 6
NU advances to the Finals

Araneta Coliseum, Quezon City
Referees: E. Mendoza, R. Moreto, J. Celeste

=== Finals ===
The finals is a best-of-three playoff.

The UST Growling Tigresses, by virtue of winning all 14 elimination round games, qualified to their third consecutive finals. The NU Lady Bulldogs, for their part, clinched their 11th consecutive finals berth, and will face the Tigresses for the third consecutive finals.

One Sports, UAAP Varsity Channel

December 6, 2025
11:30 a.m.

Report

UST Growling Tigresses	79–84	NU Lady Bulldogs
Scoring by quarter: 13–16, 22–26, 25–19, 19–23
Pts: Eka Soriano 20; Rebs: Kent Pastrana 10; Asts: Kent Pastrana 8		Pts: Angel Surada 19; Rebs: Aloha Betanio 8 Asts: Aloha Betanio 5

Araneta Coliseum, Quezon City
Referees: G. Alap, N. Cortez, J. Garcia

One Sports, UAAP Varsity Channel

December 10, 2025
1:00 p.m.

Report

UST Growling Tigresses	95–70	NU Lady Bulldogs
Scoring by quarter: 26–17, 22–23, 27–13, 20–17
Pts: Karylle Sierba 17; Rebs: Vergen Maglupay 15; Asts: Eka Soriano 8		Pts: Kristine Cayabyab 22; Rebs: Karl Pingol 10; Asts: Aloha Betanio 4

SM Mall of Asia Arena, Pasay

One Sports, UAAP Varsity Channel

December 14, 2025
1:00 p.m.

Report

UST Growling Tigresses	79–64	NU Lady Bulldogs
Scoring by quarter: 11–17, 26–13, 34–23, 8–11
Pts: Kent Pastrana 16; Rebs: Kent Pastrana 9 Asts: Eka Soriano 6		Pts: Kristine Cayabyab 21; Rebs: Angel Surada 16; Asts: Aloha Betanio 7
UST wins series 2–1

SM Mall of Asia Arena, Pasay

=== Awards ===
UAAP Season 88 women's basketball champions
UST Growling Tigresses
13th title

The end-of-season awards were handed out prior to game 2 of the finals at the SM Mall of Asia Arena.

- Most Valuable Player: Ann Pingol (NU Lady Bulldogs)
- Rookie of the Year: Erica De Luna (Ateneo Blue Eagles)
- Elite Team:
  - Ann Pingol (NU Lady Bulldogs)
  - Kacey Dela Rosa (Ateneo Blue Eagles)
  - Kent Pastrana (UST Growling Tigresses)
  - Kristine Cayabyab (NU Lady Bulldogs)
  - Angel Surada (NU Lady Bulldogs)

==== Player of the Week ====
The Collegiate Press Corps awards a "player of the week" throughout the season:

Week	Player	Team
Week 1	(Philippines) Kacey dela Rosa	Ateneo Blue Eagles
Week 2	(Nigeria) Isioma Onianwa	UST Growling Tigresses
Week 3	(Philippines) Kent Pastrana	UST Growling Tigresses
Week 4	(Philippines) Karylle Sierba	UST Growling Tigresses
Week 5	(Philippines) Angel Surada	NU Lady Bulldogs
Week 6	(Philippines) Karl Pingol	NU Lady Bulldogs
Week 7	(Philippines) Kent Pastrana	UST Growling Tigresses
Week 8	(Philippines) Kyla Go	De La Salle Lady Archers

=== Discipline ===
- Coach Haydee Ong of UST was suspended after being called for two technical fouls on their game against Adamson. Ong will serve out her suspension on their game against Ateneo. Sen Dysangco coached the Tigresses against the Blue Eagles.

== 19U boys' tournament ==
The 19U boys' tournament started on January 11, 2026, with Ateneo defeating UE.

=== Elimination round ===
==== Team standings ====
Pos	Team	W	L	PCT	GB	Qualification
1	NUNS Bullpups	12	2	.857	—	Twice-to-beat in the semifinals
2	FEU–D Baby Tamaraws (H)	11	3	.786 (Note: Second seed playoff: FEU 111–73 Ateneo)	1	Twice-to-beat in the semifinals
3	Ateneo Blue Eagles	11	3	.786	1	Twice-to-win in the semifinals
4	Zobel Junior Archers	8	6	.571	4	Twice-to-win in the semifinals
5	UE Junior Red Warriors	5	9	.357 (Note: Head-to-head record: UE 1–1 (+2) UST)	7	
6	UST Tiger Cubs	5	9	.357	7	
7	Adamson Baby Falcons	4	10	.286	8	
8	UPIS Junior Fighting Maroons	0	14	.000	12	

Rules for classification: 1) winning percentage; 2) if tied for #2 or #4, one-game playoff; 3) head-to-head record; 4) head-to-head point differential; 5) overall point differential:
(H) Hosts

==== Match-up results ====
	Round 1							Round 2						
Team ╲ Game	1	2	3	4	5	6	7	8	9	10	11	12	13	14
Adamson	NU school colors	UP school colors	UST school colors	UE school colors	La Salle school colors	Ateneo school colors	FEU school colors	UP school colors	FEU school colors	UST school colors	Ateneo school colors	La Salle school colors	NU school colors	UE school colors
Ateneo	UE school colors	FEU school colors	La Salle school colors	NU school colors	UST school colors	Adamson school colors	UP school colors	NU school colors	UE school colors	La Salle school colors	Adamson school colors	UST school colors	UP school colors	FEU school colors
DLSZ	UP school colors	NU school colors	Ateneo school colors	UST school colors	Adamson school colors	FEU school colors	UE school colors	FEU school colors	UP school colors	Ateneo school colors	UE school colors	Adamson school colors	UST school colors	NU school colors
FEU–D	UST school colors	Ateneo school colors	NU school colors	UP school colors	UE school colors	La Salle school colors	Adamson school colors	La Salle school colors	Adamson school colors	NU school colors	UST school colors	UP school colors	UE school colors	Ateneo school colors
NUNS	Adamson school colors	La Salle school colors	FEU school colors	Ateneo school colors	UP school colors	UE school colors	UST school colors	Ateneo school colors	UST school colors	FEU school colors	UP school colors	UE school colors	Adamson school colors	La Salle school colors
UE	Ateneo school colors	UST school colors	UP school colors	Adamson school colors	FEU school colors	NU school colors	La Salle school colors	UST school colors	Ateneo school colors	UP school colors	La Salle school colors	NU school colors	FEU school colors	Adamson school colors
UPIS	La Salle school colors	Adamson school colors	UE school colors	FEU school colors	NU school colors	UST school colors	Ateneo school colors	Adamson school colors	La Salle school colors	UE school colors	NU school colors	FEU school colors	Ateneo school colors	UST school colors
UST	FEU school colors	UE school colors	Adamson school colors	La Salle school colors	Ateneo school colors	UP school colors	NU school colors	UE school colors	NU school colors	Adamson school colors	FEU school colors	Ateneo school colors	La Salle school colors	UP school colors

Source: UAAP on Livestats
= Win; = OT win; = Loss; = OT loss

==== Scores ====
Results on top and to the right of the grey cells are for first-round games; those to the bottom and to the left of it are second-round games.

Teams	AdU	ADMU	DLSZ	FEU-D	NUNS	UE	UPIS	UST
Adamson Baby Falcons		77–73	45–71	76–83	74–76	68–67	71–47	70–79
Ateneo Blue Eagles	88–65		80–65	90–71	86–63	91–84	96–70	100–88
DLSZ Junior Archers	71–59	80–72		61–79	50–60	60–64	98–42	72–67
FEU-D Baby Tamaraws	84–65	82–86	69–61		79–78	96–73	93–75	82–78
NUNS Bullpups	86–68	81–78	83–66	80–72		84–78	124–41	78–74
UE Junior Warriors	77–73	58–67	47–59	62–71	73–80		92–72	102–107*
UPIS Junior Fighting Maroons	64–72	57–103	47–83	103–52	60–92	61–94		57–112
UST Tiger Cubs	75–73	83–90	80–84	81–84	72–92	60–57	83–24	

Source: UAAP on Livestats
Legend: Blue = left column team win; Red = top row team win.
Matches with lighter background shading were decided after overtime.

=== Bracket ===
Semifinals (Top 2 twice-to-beat)
1	NUNS	72
4	DLSZ	70
2	FEU–D	90
3	Ateneo	89

Finals (Best-of-three playoff)
1	NUNS	73	80	102
2	FEU–D	77	59	106*

=== Semifinals ===
FEU Diliman denied NUNS an unbeaten elimination round record, allowing for the usage of the regular Final Four format. NUNS and UST will have the twice-to-beat advantage in the semifinals against Ateneo and DLSZ, respectively.

==== (1) NUNS vs. (4) DLSZ ====
UAAP Varsity Channel

March 15, 2026
1:00 p.m.

NUNS Bullpups	75–70	Zobel Junior Archers
Scoring by quarter: 17–21, 16–17, 21–16, 21–16
Pts: Moussa Diakite 14. Rebs: Moussa Diakite 15. Asts: Rhon-j Matias 5.		Pts: Maco Dabao 23. Rebs: Yusuf Mikailu 12. Asts: Yusuf Mikailu 5.
NUNS wins series in one game

Blue Eagle Gym, Quezon City

==== (2) FEU Diliman vs. (3) Ateneo ====
UAAP Varsity Channel

March 15, 2025
12:00 p.m.

FEU–D Baby Tamaraws	90–89	Ateneo Blue Eagles
Scoring by quarter: 13–21, 29–15, 22–30, 25–24
Pts: JB Cagurungan 22. Rebs: Cabs Cabonilas 8. Asts: Khean Esperanza 6.		Pts: Jude Eriobu 36; Rebs: Jude Eriobu 22; Asts: Jay M Leal 5
FEU Diliman wins series in one game

Blue Eagle Gym, Quezon City

=== Finals ===
The finals will be a best-of-three playoff.

UAAP Varsity Channel

March 22, 2026
3:00 p.m.

FEU–D Baby Tamaraws	77–73	NUNS Bullpups
Scoring by quarter: 23–23, 16–15, 23–25, 8–14
Pts: Collins Akowe 25. Rebs: Collins Akowe 22. Asts: Roje Matias 5.		Pts: Racine Kane 24. Rebs: Racine Kane 12. Asts: Kirk Canete 7.

Blue Eagle Gym, Quezon City

UAAP Varsity Channel

March 20, 2025
12:00 p.m.

FEU–D Baby Tamaraws	85–89	NUNS Bullpups
Scoring by quarter: 17–22, 19–26, 25–24, 24–17
Pts: Collins Akowe 28. Rebs: Collins Akowe 26. Asts: Carl Alfanta 5.		Pts: Koji Buenaflor 24. Rebs: Kirk Canete 6. Asts: Kirk Canete 5.

Blue Eagle Gym, Quezon City

UAAP Varsity Channel

March 27, 2025
12:00 p.m.

FEU–D Baby Tamaraws	106–102 (OT)	NUNS Bullpups
Scoring by quarter: 18–24, 17–22, 14–14, 25–14, Overtime: 3–9
Pts: Collins Akowe 23. Rebs: Collins Akowe 24. Asts: Chad Cartel 6.		Pts: Racine Kane 28. Rebs: Racine Kane 17. Asts: Kirk Canete 10.
FEU Diliman wins series, 2–1

Blue Eagle Gym, Quezon City

- Finals Most Valuable Player: Wilhalm Cabonilas (FEU–D Baby Tamaraws)

=== Awards ===
UAAP Season 88 boys' basketball champions
FEU–D Baby Tamaraws
Tenth title

The end-of-season were handed out prior to Game 2 of the Finals at the Blue Eagle Gym.https://tiebreakertimes.com.ph/tbt/cabs-cabonilas-rhianne-perez-crowned-mvps-of-uaap-hs-basketball/369495

- Most Valuable Player: Wilhalm Cabonilas (FEU–D Baby Tamaraws)
- Best Foreign Student-Athlete: Jude Eriobu (Ateneo Blue Eagles)
- Rookie of the Year: Moussa Diakite (NUNS Bullpups)
- Elite Team:
  - Jude Eriobu (Ateneo Blue Eagles)
  - Wilhalm Cabonilas (FEU–D Baby Tamaraws)
  - Maco Dabao (Zobel Junior Archers)
  - Kirk Cañete (UST Tiger Cubs)
  - Jay-M Leal (Ateneo Blue Eagles)

== 19U girls' tournament ==
The 19U girls' tournament started on January 11, 2026, with NUNS defeating Ateneo.

=== Elimination round ===
==== Team standings ====
Pos	Team	W	L	PCT	GB	Qualification
1	NUNS Lady Bullpups	5	1	.833 (Note: Head-to-head record: NUNS 1–1 (+10) UST)	—	Advance to the Finals
2	UST Junior Tigresses	5	1	.833	—	Advance to the Finals
3	Zobel Junior Lady Archers	2	4	.333	3	
4	Ateneo Blue Eagles	0	6	.000	5	

Rules for classification: 1) winning percentage; 2) if tied for #2 or #4, one-game playoff; 3) head-to-head record; 4) head-to-head point differential; 5) overall point differential

==== Match-up results ====
	Round 1			Round 2		
Team ╲ Game	1	2	3	4	5	6
Ateneo	NU school colors	UST school colors	La Salle school colors	UST school colors	La Salle school colors	NU school colors
DLSZ	UST school colors	NU school colors	Ateneo school colors	NU school colors	UST school colors	Ateneo school colors
NUNS	Ateneo school colors	La Salle school colors	UST school colors	La Salle school colors	Ateneo school colors	UST school colors
UST	La Salle school colors	Ateneo school colors	NU school colors	Ateneo school colors	La Salle school colors	NU school colors

Source: UAAP on Livestats
= Win; = OT win; = Loss; = OT loss

==== Scores ====
Results on top and to the right of the grey cells are for first-round games; those to the bottom and to the left are second-round games.

Teams	ADMU	DLSZ	NUNS	UST
Ateneo Blue Eagles		21–101	29–155	32–136
Zobel Junior Lady Archers	100–47		45–95	59–90
NUNS Lady Bullpups	107–49	82–62		74–62
UST Junior Tigresses	146–36	81–56	73–71	

Source: UAAP on Livestats
Legend: Blue = left column team win; Red = top row team win.
Matches with lighter background shading were decided after overtime.

=== Finals ===
UST and NUNS qualified to the best-of-three Finals after finishing in the top two places after the elimination round.

UAAP Varsity Channel

March 13, 2025
10:00 a.m.

UST Junior Tigresses	85–57	NUNS Lady Bullpups
Scoring by quarter: 27–19, 17–17, 18–13, 23–8
Pts: Barby Dajao 25. Rebs: Barby Dajao 14. Asts: Barby Dajao 5.		Pts: Marielle Avila 15. Rebs: Aubrey Lapasaran 7. Asts: KJ Badajos

Filoil EcoOil Centre, San Juan

UAAP Varsity Channel

March 20, 2025
10:00 a.m.

UST Junior Tigresses	63–57	NUNS Lady Bullpups
Scoring by quarter: 21–23, 21–16, 8–14, 13–4
Pts: Barby Dajao 22. Rebs: Barby Dajao 15. Asts: Rhiane Perez 5.		Pts: Aubrey Lapasaran 22. Rebs: Abong, Rosano, 14. Asts: Aubrey Lapasaran 3.
UST wins series, 2–0

Filoil EcoOil Centre, San Juan

- Finals Most Valuable Player: Rhiane Perez (UST Junior Tigresses)

=== Awards ===
UAAP Season 88 girls' basketball champions
UST Junior Tigresses
Third title, third consecutive title

The end-of-season were handed out prior to Game 2 of the Finals at the Blue Eagle Gym

- Most Valuable Player: Rhiane Perez (UST Junior Tigresses)
- Rookie of the Year: Rhiane Perez (UST Junior Tigresses)
- Elite Team:
  - Barby Dajao (UST Junior Tigresses)
  - Erica De Luna (Zobel Junior Lady Archers)
  - Rhiane Perez (UST Junior Tigresses)
  - Aubrey Lapasaran (NUNS Lady Bullpups)
  - Katrina Insoy (UST Junior Tigresses)

== 16U tournament ==
The tournament began on September 20, 2025 with FEU Diliman defeating Ateneo.

=== Elimination round ===
The UAAP postponed the November 9 games due to the predicted effects of Typhoon Uwan (Fung-wong).

==== Team standings ====
Pos	Team	W	L	PCT	GB	Qualification
1	NUNS Bullpups	14	0	1.000	—	Advance to the Finals (Note: As NUNS won all of their elimination round games, the stepladder format was used instead of the regular Final Four format.)
2	UST Tiger Cubs (H)	10	4	.714	4	Advance to stepladder semifinal
3	FEU–D Baby Tamaraws	9	5	.643 (Note: Head-to-head record: FEU-Diliman 2–0 Adamson)	5	Proceed to stepladder quarterfinal
4	Adamson Baby Falcons	9	5	.643	5	Proceed to stepladder quarterfinal
5	UE Junior Red Warriors	8	6	.571	6	
6	Ateneo Blue Eagles	4	10	.286	10	
7	UPIS Junior Fighting Maroons	2	12	.143	12	
8	Zobel Junior Archers	0	14	.000	14	

Source: Rappler
Rules for classification: 1) winning percentage; 2) if tied for #2 or #4, one-game playoff; 3) head-to-head record; 4) head-to-head point differential; 5) overall point differential
(H) Hosts

==== Match-up results ====
	Round 1							Round 2						
Team ╲ Game	1	2	3	4	5	6	7	8	9	10	11	12	13	14
Adamson	La Salle school colors	UP school colors	Ateneo school colors	FEU school colors	NU school colors	UE school colors	UST school colors	UE school colors	UST school colors	FEU school colors	NU school colors	UP school colors	La Salle school colors	Ateneo school colors
Ateneo	FEU school colors	UE school colors	Adamson school colors	La Salle school colors	UP school colors	UST school colors	NU school colors	FEU school colors	NU school colors	UE school colors	UST school colors	UP school colors	Adamson school colors	La Salle school colors
DLSZ	Adamson school colors	UST school colors	FEU school colors	Ateneo school colors	NU school colors	UE school colors	UP school colors	UST school colors	UE school colors	NU school colors	FEU school colors	Adamson school colors	UP school colors	Ateneo school colors
FEU–D	Ateneo school colors	NU school colors	La Salle school colors	Adamson school colors	UP school colors	UST school colors	UE school colors	Ateneo school colors	UP school colors	Adamson school colors	NU school colors	La Salle school colors	UE school colors	UST school colors
NUNS	UE school colors	FEU school colors	UST school colors	UP school colors	Adamson school colors	La Salle school colors	Ateneo school colors	UP school colors	Ateneo school colors	La Salle school colors	Adamson school colors	FEU school colors	UE school colors	UST school colors
UE	NU school colors	Ateneo school colors	UP school colors	UST school colors	Adamson school colors	La Salle school colors	FEU school colors	Adamson school colors	La Salle school colors	Ateneo school colors	UP school colors	UST school colors	NU school colors	FEU school colors
UPIS	UST school colors	Adamson school colors	UE school colors	NU school colors	Ateneo school colors	FEU school colors	La Salle school colors	NU school colors	FEU school colors	UST school colors	UE school colors	Adamson school colors	Ateneo school colors	La Salle school colors
UST	UP school colors	La Salle school colors	NU school colors	UE school colors	Ateneo school colors	FEU school colors	Adamson school colors	La Salle school colors	Adamson school colors	UP school colors	UE school colors	Ateneo school colors	NU school colors	FEU school colors

Source: UAAP on Livestats
= Win; = OT win; = Loss; = OT loss

==== Scores ====
Results on top and to the right of the grey cells are for first-round games; those to the bottom and to the left are second-round games.

Teams	AdU	ADMU	DLSZ	FEU-D	NUNS	UE	UPIS	UST
Adamson Baby Falcons		80–75	85–69	73–82	82–93	83–82*	85–60	86–87
Ateneo Blue Eagles	69–86		93–67	80–91	74–99	77–87	87–40	74–84
Zobel Junior Archers	38–84	63–82		65–80	56–77	66–89	59–70	70–91
FEU-D Baby Tamaraws	71–65	98–74	100–79		66–78	72–68	86–37	82–92
NUNS Bullpups	83–71	85–61	95–55	72–68		72–57	81–46	85–63
UE Junior Warriors	71–84	96–69	72–69	98–90**	64–83		88–56	87–78
UPIS Junior Fighting Maroons	41–76	60–76	86–77	46–85	39–107	29–76		61–114
UST Tiger Cubs	76–87	100–81	97–82	108–70	79–92	102–93	121–54	

Source: UAAP on Livestats
Legend: Blue = left column team win; Red = top row team win.
Matches with lighter background shading were decided after overtime.

=== Bracket ===
Stepladder quarterfinal (Single-elimination)
3	FEU–D	90
4	Adamson	76

Stepladder semifinal (Single-elimination)
2	UST	75
3	FEU–D	82

Finals (Best-of-three playoff)
1	NUNS	79	82
3	FEU–D	49	72

=== Stepladder playoffs ===
The stepladder playoffs are sudden-death games.

==== (3) FEU Diliman vs. (4) Adamson ====
FEU Diliman secured a semifinals berth after their win over DLSZ. Adamson's victory against UE clinched the playoffs berth for the former, and eliminated the latter. Adamson qualified to the stepladder quarterfinals. FEU's defeat by UST in their elimination round finale relegated them to the stepladder quarterfinals.

UAAP Varsity Channel

November 30, 2025
8:30 a.m.

FEU–D Baby Tamaraws	90–76	Adamson Baby Falcons
Scoring by quarter: 24–11, 22–23, 23–26, 21–16
Pts: Dwyne Enriquez 29; Rebs: Cariño, Pineda 12; Asts: Prince Pineda 7		Pts: Fran Flores 31; Rebs: Keefy Iledan 8 Asts: Fran Flores 5
FEU Diliman advances to the stepladder round 2

SM Mall of Asia Arena, Pasay

==== (2) UST vs. (3) FEU Diliman ====
UST clinched a semifinals berth after winning against Ateneo. The Tiger Cubs clinched the #2 seed with their defeat of FEU Diliman in the elimination round finale.

UAAP Varsity Channel

December 3, 2025
8:30 a.m.

UST Tiger Cubs	75–82	FEU–D Baby Tamaraws
Scoring by quarter: 21–11, 18–26, 20–20, 16–25
Pts: Rowie Cabañero 18; Rebs: CJ Tabbuga 14; Asts: Rowie Cabañero 8		Pts: Dwyne Enriquez 22; Rebs: Prince Cariño 22; Asts: Dwayne Cañete 6
FEU Diliman advances to the Finals

Araneta Coliseum, Quezon City
Referees: R. del Mar, R. Dionson, A. Talplacido

=== Finals ===
The finals is a best-of-three playoff.

The NUNS Bullpups were the first team to clinch a semifinals berth after their win against the Adamson Baby Falcons. They then clinched the twice-to-beat advantage after winning against FEU Diliman. After winning all elimination round games, including the finale against UST, the Bullpups clinched an outright finals berth. The FEU Diliman Baby Tamaraws qualified to its first 16U finals after defeating previous season's finalists UST.

UAAP Varsity Channel

December 6, 2025
9:30 a.m.

Report

NUNS Bullpups	79–49	FEU–D Baby Tamaraws
Scoring by quarter: 23–9, 24–20, 14–6, 18–14
Pts: David Sabareza 30; Rebs: Moussa Diakite 15; Asts: Ian Manalo 5		Pts: Prince Pineda 13; Rebs: Prince Pineda 9 Asts: Dwyne Enriquez 3

Araneta Coliseum, Quezon City
Referees: J. Celeste, J. Talledo, I. Sanoan

UAAP Varsity Channel

December 10, 2025
11:00 a.m.

Report

NUNS Bullpups	82–72	FEU–D Baby Tamaraws
Scoring by quarter: 21–16, 16–28, 8–17, 27–21
Pts: Prince Cariño 19; Rebs: Prince Cariño 11; Asts: Kyle Mojica 6		Pts: Moussa Diakite 21; Rebs: Moussa Diakite 17; Asts: Mark Arzola 10
NUNS wins series 2–0

SM Mall of Asia Arena, Pasay

- Finals Most Valuable Player: David Sabareza (NUNS Bullpups)

=== Awards ===
UAAP Season 88 juniors' basketball champions
NUNS Bullpups
First title

The end-of-season awards were handed out prior to game 2 of the finals at the SM Mall of Asia Arena.

- Most Valuable Player: Goodluck Okebata (UE Junior Red Warriors)
- Rookie of the Year: Rowie Cabañero (UST Tiger Cubs)
- Elite Team:
  - Goodluck Okebata (UE Junior Red Warriors)
  - Rowie Cabañero (UST Tiger Cubs)
  - Dwyne Enriquez (FEU–D Baby Tamaraws)
  - Moussa Diakite (NUNS Bullpups)
  - Prince Cariño (FEU–D Baby Tamaraws)

== Overall championship points ==
Pts.	Ranking
15	Champion
12	2nd
10	3rd
8	4th
6	5th
4	6th
2	7th
1	8th
—	Did not join
WD	Withdrew

=== Collegiate division ===
Rank	Team	Men	Women	Total
1st	UST	10	12	22
2nd	UP	15	6	21
3rd	Adamson	8	10	18
4th	NU	2	15	17
5th	La Salle	12	4	16
6th	Ateneo	1	8	9
7th	UE	6	1	7
8th	FEU	4	2	6

=== High school division ===
Rank	Team	Boys	Girls	JHS	Total
1st	UST	15	15	12	42
2nd	NUNS	12	12	8	32
3rd	FEU–D	10	–	10	20
4th	UE	6	–	15	21
5th	DLSZ	4	10	6	20
6th	Ateneo	2	8	4	14
7th	Adamson	8	–	2	10
8th	UPIS	1	–	1	2

In case of a tie, the team with the higher position in any tournament is ranked higher. If both are still tied, they are listed by alphabetical order.

How rankings are determined:

- Ranks fifth to eighth determined by elimination round standings.
- Semifinal losers ranked by elimination round standings.
  - If stepladder: Loser of stepladder semifinals round 1 is ranked fourth
  - If stepladder: Loser of stepladder semifinals round 2 is ranked third
- Loser of the finals is ranked second
- Champion is ranked first

== See also ==
- NCAA Season 101 basketball tournaments
