= Harold Alarcon =

Filipino basketball player (born 2002)

No. 81 – San Juan Knights
- Position: Shooting guard
- League: MPBL

Personal information
- Born: March 18, 2002 (age 24) Silay, Negros Occidental, Philippines
- Listed height: 6 ft 1 in (1.85 m)

Career information
- High school: Bacolod Tay Tung (Bacolod, Philippines); NSNU (Manila, Philippines)
- College: UP (2022–2025)
- Playing career: 2026–present

Career history
- 2026–present: San Juan Knights

Career highlights
- MPBL All-Star (2026); 2× UAAP champion (2021, 2024); 3× Filoil EcoOil Preseason Cup champion (2023–2025); Filoil EcoOil Preseason Cup Most Valuable Player (2023)

Harold Reparo Alarcon (born March 18, 2002) is a Filipino professional basketball player for the San Juan Knights of the Maharlika Pilipinas Basketball League (MPBL). He has won championships in the juniors and seniors divisions of the University Athletic Association of the Philippines (UAAP) for the NU Bullpups and UP Fighting Maroons.

== Early life ==
Alarcon was born in Silay City, Negros Occidental. At a young age, he was inspired to play basketball because of his aunts and his father, who played in barangay leagues.

== High school career ==
=== Bacolod Tay Tung High School ===
For three years, Alarcon attended Bacolod Tay Tung High School. At 13 years old, he also attended Jr. NBA camps in Cebu and Shanghai.

Alarcon started getting more national attention during the 2017–18 NBTC season. In the Bacolod qualifiers, he posted a triple-double of 51 points, 10 rebounds, and 10 assists in a rout of Trinity Christian School. He went on to lead them to a spot in the 2018 NBTC National Finals. There, they lost in the first round to the NU Bullpups. He also played in the 2018 Palarong Pambansa.

=== NU Bullpups ===
During the summer of 2018, Alarcon transferred to NSNU. With NU, he helped them win the 2018 ASEAN School Games. He also was a part of NU's back-to-back PSSBC titles and their UAAP Season 81 championship. In 2019, he got to participate in the Basketball Without Borders Asia camp, where he was named its All-Star MVP. In Season 82, he played a key role off the bench as he helped NU win that season's title. However, he was not able to play for NU in his senior season as Season 83 was cancelled due to the COVID-19 pandemic. After high school, he was recruited by Ateneo, DLSU, NU, and UP.

== College career ==
=== UP Fighting Maroons ===
On September 28, 2021, Alarcon committed to the UP Fighting Maroons. The move reunited him with coach Goldwin Monteverde and several of his high school teammates from NU such as Carl Tamayo, Gerry Abadiano, and batchmate Terrence Fortea.

==== Rookie season and first UAAP seniors' championship ====
Alarcon made his UAAP seniors' debut in Season 84. He did not play heavy minutes in his rookie season due to UP's talented backcourt. Still he was able to contribute as one of the team's most efficient shooters from three-point range. In the Final Four against the De La Salle Green Archers, with guards Fortea and CJ Cansino out due to injuries, he stepped with 14 points on three made triples along with six rebounds, two steals, an assist, and a block as he helped UP get over a 14-point margin and reach the finals. UP went on to win its first title in 36 years. He also competed in the UAAP 3x3 competition that season.

==== 2022–23: Runner-up finishes ====
In Season 85, Alarcon was UP's seventh-leading scorer. In Game 2 of the finals, he supplied 11 points, four rebounds, two assists, and one steal as the Ateneo Blue Eagles tied the series. In Game 3, he was fouled taking a three pointer with UP down 63–70 in the final minute of the game. He made the first, missed the second, then missed the third in a way that allowed him to get an offensive rebound and make a three pointer that brought UP to within three, 63–70. After Ateneo made two free throws on the other end, he missed a three-pointer and Ateneo hung on to win the championship over UP.

In the preseason, Alarcon helped UP win its first Filoil EcoOil Preseason Cup title and was named the tournament's MVP. UP started Season 86 5–0 with a win over the UST Growling Tigers in which he had 21 points, four rebounds, and four assists. He then followed it up with a near double-double of 10 points and eight rebounds in a win over DLSU. Once again, UP made the finals, this time against DLSU. In Game 1, he tied his season-high of 21 points as they won by 30 points over DLSU. He also helped hold DLSU's MVP and former teammate at NU Kevin Quiambao to 11 points on 40% shooting. However, DLSU won the next two games, making UP runners-up once again.

==== 2024: Second UAAP seniors' championship ====
Once again, Alarcon was key in UP defending its Filoil preseason title. In the first game of Season 87, he helped UP come back from being down by 22 in the first quarter against the Adamson Soaring Falcons with 14 points and eight rebounds. Against UST, he scored 16 points on 50% shooting to give UP a 6–0 start to the season. Their winning streak was snapped against DLSU despite his 19 points, five rebounds, and three steals. On November 20, 2024, he scored his college career-high of 33 points in a win over the UE Red Warriors. In the Final Four, he led with 16 points against UST as they reached the finals for the fourth straight season. This time, UP was able to reclaim the championship.

==== 2025: Final season ====
Right after winning the Season 87 title, Alarcon confirmed that he would return for his final season. Also playing alongside him in their final seasons were Abadiano, Fortea and NU transferees Janjan Felicilda and Reyland Torres. With their NU connections, they became known as the "Maroon 5".

After UP started Season 88 0–2, Alarcon led them to back to back wins. He then came off the bench for 17 points, five rebounds, and four assists in a win over Ateneo for UP's third straight win. He scored 24 points in a win over NU. Against UST in the elimination round, he hit seven clutch points including the go-ahead jumper with only 22 seconds left to lead UP to the win. In the Final Four against UST, he led the team with 22 points as UP returned to the finals for the fifth straight season.

Once again, UP faced DLSU in the finals. In Game 1 of the finals, he had a college career-high 34 points on 12-of-22 shooting, however DLSU won 74–70. DLSU eventually won the finals in three games.

== Professional career ==
On January 17, 2026, Alarcon, along with college teammates Abadiano, Torres, and Fortea, all signed with the San Juan Knights in the MPBL.

== National team career ==
=== Junior national team ===
Alarcon was invited to be part of the Philippines' training pool for the 2018 FIBA Under-17 Basketball World Cup.

== Personal life ==
Alarcon is currently dating Roma Doromal, a professional volleyball player. He has a sister, Hannah May Alarcon.
