= Evan Nelle =

Filipino basketball player (born 1998)

No. 0 – NLEX Road Warriors
- Position: Point guard
- League: PBA

Personal information
- Born: June 8, 1998 (age 28) Muntinlupa, Philippines
- Listed height: 5 ft 11 in (1.80 m)

Career information
- High school: San Beda–Rizal (Taytay, Rizal)
- College: San Beda (2018–2019); De La Salle (2022–2023)
- PBA draft: 2024: 2nd round, 14th overall pick
- Drafted by: NorthPort Batang Pier
- Playing career: 2024–present

Career history
- 2024–2025: NorthPort Batang Pier
- 2025–2026: Phoenix Fuel Masters / Phoenix Super LPG Fuel Masters
- 2026–present: NLEX Road Warriors

Career highlights
- UAAP champion (2023); NCAA Philippines champion (2018); 2× PBA D-League champion (2022 Aspirants' Cup, 2023 Aspirants' Cup); Filoil Flying V Preseason Cup champion (2019); 2× Filoil Flying V Preseason Cup Mythical Five (2019, 2023)

Evan Heinrich Nikolai Nelle (born June 8, 1998) is a Filipino basketball player for the NLEX Road Warriors of the Philippine Basketball Association (PBA). He played for the De La Salle Green Archers and San Beda Red Lions. He has won championships in the NCAA and in the UAAP.

== Early life ==
When he was in grade school, Nelle studied at De La Salle-Zobel. He started playing basketball in Grade 3. His father taught him how to play basketball and he was inspired to play after seeing Derek Fisher's "0.4 shot".

== High school career ==
In high school, Nelle transferred to San Beda–Rizal. In his first year on the team, he led the San Beda Red Cubs to a 20–1 record in NCAA Season 91 including the playoffs, and won Finals MVP as the Red Cubs won their seventh straight championship. He also led San Beda to the NBTC Division 1 Finals, where they lost to the NU Bullpups. He then played in the NBTC All-Star Game (in which he won the All-Star Game MVP), and in the SLAM Rising Stars Classic.

Due to the implementation of K-12 in the country, Nelle and most of his teammates got to play for the Red Cubs for two more seasons. In his second season, he started Season 92 with averages of 7.9 points on 34% shooting in the first round of eliminations. He was able to break out of that slump with 27 points, four assists, and three rebounds in a win over the La Salle Greenies, earning a Player of the Week award in the process. Although they lost to the Malayan Red Robins in the Finals, he was second in the league in assists. He got to play in the NBTC All-Star Game once again, and led the Red Cubs to a NBTC Division 1 title.

In NCAA Season 93, Nelle scored 27 points with five triples, and also made six assists in a win over the Red Robins. In a game against the JRU Light Bombers, he made two clutch free throws and a fastbreak layup with .3 seconds remaining to finish with 19 points and a one-point win. The Red Cubs didn't make the Finals after they were upset by the Greenies in triple overtime, despite his 26 points, 11 rebounds, eight assists and all while battling cramps. His cramps affected several of his shots which could have won that game for the Red Cubs. For that season, he averaged 14.2 points, 6.8 assists, 5.0 rebounds and 1.3 steals per game while also leading the league in three-pointers made. He finished 16th out of 24 players in the NBTC rankings, earning him another NBTC All-Star Game selection. He also played in his final SLAM Rising Stars Classic, winning co-MVP honors with a younger Kai Sotto.

== College career ==
=== San Beda Red Lions ===
In 2018, Nelle stayed with the San Beda program, and joined the San Beda Red Lions. He originally wanted to go to DLSU, but they didn't recruit him. He joined a recruiting class that also included James Kwekuteye and Damie Cuntapay. In his rookie season, although he had little playing time, he served as Robert Bolick's backup, and was part of the San Beda squad that won the NCAA Season 94 title.

==== Season 95: Breakout season ====
In the preseason before Season 95, Nelle and Kwekuteye helped San Beda win the 2019 Filoil Flying V Preseason Cup, finishing the tournament undefeated. The duo, along with teammate Donald Tankoua, were named to the Mythical Team. During the tournament, the duo was referred to as the "Bandana Bros" due to the bandanas they started wearing.

Nelle started San Beda's title defense with a win over the Arellano Chiefs in which he had nine points, five rebounds, and five assists. He then put up a career-high 14 assists in a win over the JRU Heavy Bombers, the most in the league since Jio Jalalon have 16 assists in 2015. The following game, he scored a then college career-high 15 points and added seven assists in a win over the EAC Generals, while Kwekuteye had a season-high 21 points in that win. He then had a double-double of 14 points and a career-high 14 rebounds in a win over the San Sebastian Stags. He broke his career-high with 18 points, seven rebounds, and three assists in a win over the Letran Knights, although he did have eight turnovers, got into foul trouble and missed clutch free throws that almost gave Letran the win. In San Beda's sixth straight win of the season, he scored 12 points and four assists against the Perpetual Altas. In San Beda's seventh straight win, he scored nine of his 14 points in the fourth, along with seven assists and four rebounds to prevent the Lyceum Pirates from breaking the streak. San Beda then won their 10th straight game of the season against EAC in which he had a double-double of 14 points and 11 assists. They extended the streak in a win over the Mapúa Cardinals in which he and Kwekuteye combined for 30 points. They kept winning until the end of the eliminations, completing 18 games without a loss. By that point, he led the league in assists with 6.7 per game, and also averaged 10.2 points, 4.5 rebounds, and 1.6 steals. He joined teammates Kwekuteye and Calvin Oftana (who was awarded as that season's MVP) on the NCAA Mythical Team.

In Game 1 of the Finals against Letran, Nelle scored an NCAA seniors career-high of 20 points, but only had one assist as Letran took the win. In Game 2, he only had five points, but made a clutch rebound that led to two clutch free throws from Kwekuteye and San Beda won by three. With the championship on the line in Game 3, he exchanged clutch shots with Letran's Fran Yu, including a three-pointer that brought San Beda to within two points with 11.5 seconds remaining. San Beda then forced a jump ball, giving him another shot to win the game. However, his three pointer was blocked, and Letran won the championship. In that game, he and Kwekuteye had combined to shoot a combined 7-of-29 from the field. Afterwards, their head coach Boyet Fernandez took the blame for the loss.

In 2020, Nelle decided to transfer. Later that year, he revealed that he transferred because Coach Fernandez had singled him out right after Game 3 as the reason why they lost. He also revealed that the coaching staff also didn't contact him for a month, and that he had also gotten into an argument with the team manager when practices resumed. In his time at San Beda, he averaged 10.5 points, 4.6 rebounds, 6.3 assists, and 1.4 steals in 31.5 minutes of playing time.

=== De La Salle Green Archers ===
On January 21, 2020, Nelle confirmed that he was going to transfer to the DLSU Green Archers of the UAAP. Mark Nonoy, a UAAP Rookie of the Year winner from the UST Growling Tigers, joined him to form a new backcourt tandem. Both were eligible to play beginning in UAAP Season 84.

==== UAAP Season 84: First Final Four appearance ====
In his UAAP debut, Nelle had 11 points and three assists in a win over the UE Red Warriors. They lost their first game of Season 84 against the Ateneo Blue Eagles in which he had 10 points, two boards, and two assists, but was a minus-15 on the court. He then had 13 points in a loss to the UP Fighting Maroons. In his first six games with the Green Archers, he struggled with averages of 7.8 points on 23% shooting from threes, to go with 2.8 assists, 1.8 rebounds, and 1.5 steals. Against the Adamson Soaring Falcons, he made a clutch three-pointer that helped La Salle seal the win. In a rematch against Ateneo, he scored 20 points, but Ateneo won once again. In a rematch against UE, he contributed 16 points, and six assists as they won by 29 points. Then they lost to UP once again in which he and Nonoy combined to shoot 5-of-19 from the field and had four of the team's 12 turnovers. In a loss to the FEU Tamaraws, he led with 15 points on four three-pointers along with seven rebounds and five assists. La Salle was able to get back into the Final Four after five seasons with a win over Adamson in which he produced 11 points, five rebounds, two assists, and two steals while limiting Adamson's main scorer Jerom Lastimosa to just 11 points. Entering as the third seed against UP, he led La Salle to a Game One win with a UAAP career-high 26 points on five triples and clutch free throws, plus seven rebounds, six assists, and three steals. However, he struggled the following game with six points on 2-of-12 shooting from the field, four rebounds, four steals and three assists. He still had a chance to tie the game with 21.5 seconds remaining, but he missed his floater and UP went on to the Finals.

==== UAAP Season 85: Missing out on the Final Four ====
In the offseason, Nelle was originally gonna miss DLSU's inaugural campaign in the 2022 PBA D-League Aspirants' Cup for personal reasons. However, he was able to make his return to the team in a win over FEU. He also got to faceoff against former teammate James Kwekuteye in a win over San Beda. They went on to win the title over the Marinerong Pilipino Skippers.

Season 85 saw DLSU bolstered by the addition of Kevin Quiambao, who had led them in their PBA D-League title campaign. Nelle missed a game in the first weeks of the elimination rounds due to a fever. He made his return with 10 points in a win over Ateneo. However, he missed another game, this time with Mark Nonoy also joining him on the sidelines. Nelle returned with an all-around eight points, 12 assists, six rebounds, and six steals in a win over FEU. Against Adamson, he had a near triple-double of nine points, eight boards, and nine assists, but got his third unsportsmanlike foul of the season and missed a game-winning layup in double OT. With his third unsportsmanlike foul, he was suspended for one game. La Salle got its fourth straight loss of the season against Ateneo as he was the only one in double-figures in that game with 15 points. They bounced back with a comeback win over UP, with him contributing nine points and seven assists. He then scored eight of his 10 points in the fourth quarter of a win over the NU Bulldogs that evened their record to 6–6. They closed out the elimination rounds 7–7 with a win over UST in which he scored a season-high 25 points along with four rebounds and four assists.

In their playoff game against Adamson for the last spot in the Final Four, Nelle battled Jerom Lastimosa, with Nelle scoring most of his points in the first half to give La Salle the lead, then Lastimosa going on a personal 11–0 run to bring the momentum back to Adamson. Adamson eventually took a three-point lead into the final seconds of the game, but Nelle made a clutch lay-up with 15.4 seconds remaining. After Lastimosa made two free throws, he had a chance to tie the game, but he rushed his three-pointer and the ball hit the side of the backboard. With that, La Salle missed out on the Final Four once again. Lastimosa had 22 points and six assists, while Nelle had 25 points and seven assists, but committed seven turnovers as well.

For that season, Nelle led the league in assists with 5.9, while also leading in free throw percentage with 95.7%. He also had averages of 11.1 points, 4.9 rebounds, and 1.7 steals in 28.1 minutes. Although he finished in the top 5 in statistical points and could have made the Mythical Team, he was disqualified due to his one-game suspension. His teammate Quiambao though, won Rookie of the Year.

==== UAAP Season 86: Championship season ====
After La Salle announced that they would have a new head coach with Topex Robinson replacing Derrick Pumaren, Nelle decided to stay for his final season. In the preseason, he led them to the 2023 Filoil EcoOil Preseason Cup finals, where they lost to UP. He and Quiambao made the tournament's Mythical Team. He also led them to another PBA D-League title despite getting injured with 16 points, 5 rebounds, 7 assists, and 6 steals in the championship game against his former team San Beda.

Nelle started Season 86 with 15 points, 12 assists and eight rebounds in a win over FEU. He got 15 points again against Ateneo, but shot 4-of-16 from the field as they got their first loss of the season. Against Adamson he scored six of his 12 points in a 23–0 third quarter run that led to the Archers' third win of the season and the second seed. Aside from his 12 points, he also contributed 15 rebounds and five assists. He missed a game that season due to a quad contusion. He quickly made his return in a win over UE with 14 points, four rebounds, and four assists but also committed six turnovers. In a win over UST, he had a double-double of 11 points and 10 assists alongside his four steals. In a win over NU, he had 14 points and seven assists, while Quiambao got a triple-double with 17 points, 14 assists, and 11 rebounds. Against UP, he made a clutch triple that sealed the win and finished with 17 points, six rebounds, and four assists. Although he struggled in a rematch with UE, his teammates Quiambao and Nonoy stepped up as the former grabbed his 2nd triple-double of the season while the latter scored a season-high 25 points to win their sixth straight game. They closed out the elimination rounds on an eight-game winning streak with a win over Ateneo in which he made two clutch free throws. As he averaged 11.3 points, 6.9 assists, 5.0 rebounds, and 2.0 steals, he was awarded a spot on the UAAP's Mythical Team alongside Quiambao, who won MVP.

In Game 1 of the Finals against UP, they lost by 30 points as he was held to eight points. He shot a poor 2-of-12 from the field for just four points in Game 2, but still made an impact with 12 rebounds, 10 assists while also getting five steals and was also a plus-20 on the court as DLSU bounced back. In Game 3, he made a deep three-pointer in the last six minutes of the game to cut UP's lead to one before Quiambao took over to get DLSU a lead they never gave up. He finished with 12 points, seven assists, six rebounds, and two steals as he finally won a championship with DLSU.

== Professional career ==
Nelle was drafted by the NorthPort Batang Pier with the second pick of the second round (14th overall pick) during the Season 49 draft. On July 19, 2024, he signed a two-year rookie contract with the team.

== PBA career statistics ==
Legend
GP	Games played	MPG	Minutes per game	FG%	Field-goal percentage
3FG%	3-point field-goal percentage	4P%	4-point field-goal percentage	FT%	Free-throw percentage
RPG	Rebounds per game	APG	Assists per game	SPG	Steals per game
BPG	Blocks per game	PPG	Points per game	127	Career high

As of the end of 2024–25 season

=== Season-by-season averages ===
Year	Team	GP	MPG	FG%	3P%	4P%	FT%	RPG	APG	SPG	BPG	PPG
2024–25	NorthPort	39	18.1	.390	.373	.241	.824	2.2	2.7	.9	.1	5.1
Career		39	18.1	.390	.373	.241	.824	2.2	2.7	.9	.1	5.1

== National team career ==
In 2016, Nelle joined the Philippines' men's national u-19 team that competed in the 10th SEABA Under-18 Championship. They swept that tournament to win their fifth straight title.
