= Naitou (l'orpheline) =

- Directed by: Moussa Kémoko Diakité
- Written by: Moussa Kémoko Diakité
- Cinematography: Laalioui Mohamed
- Edited by: Ahmed Bouanani
- Release date: 1982
- Running time: 120 minutes
- Country: Guinea

Naitou, l'orpheline (English: Naitou The Orphan) is a 1982 Guinean film directed by Moussa Kémoko Diakité. The film, based on a West African folktale, is unique in the fact that it is narrated musically by the Ballet National de Guinée.

== Synopsis ==
In a fit of jealousy, a woman poisons her co-wife. Not limiting herself to this one crime, she sets her sights on Naitou, the only daughter of the deceased. Eventually the "conscience" of the village, symbolized by an old woman, drives her crazy.
