= Gerry Abadiano =

Filipino basketball player (born 2001)

Ulsan Hyundai Mobis Phoebus
- Position: Point guard / shooting guard
- League: KBL

Personal information
- Born: March 8, 2001 (age 25) Iloilo City, Philippines
- Listed height: 5 ft 11 in (1.80 m)

Career information
- High school: Adamson (Manila); NSNU (Manila)
- College: UP (2022–2025)
- Playing career: 2026–present

Career history
- 2026: San Juan Knights
- 2026–present: Ulsan Hyundai Mobis Phoebus

Career highlights
- 2× UAAP champion (2021, 2024); 3× Filoil EcoOil Preseason Cup champion (2023–2025); 2× Filoil EcoOil Preseason Cup Finals Most Valuable Player (2024, 2025)

Gerry Austin T. Abadiano (born March 8, 2001) is a Filipino professional basketball player for the Ulsan Hyundai Mobis Phoebus of the Korean Basketball League (KBL).

He has won championships in the juniors and seniors division of the University Athletic Association of the Philippines (UAAP) with the NU Bullpups and UP Fighting Maroons respectively, and has played for the Philippine national under-19 team and under-17 team.

He made his professional debut in 2026 with the San Juan Knights of the Maharlika Pilipinas Basketball League and plans to go overseas later that year, joining the Ulsan Hyundai Mobis Phoebus of the Korean Basketball League.

== High school career ==
=== Adamson Baby Falcons ===
As a Grade 6 student coming from St. Roberts International Academy who had just competed in the Palarong Pambansa, Abadiano was discovered by Coach Goldwin Monteverde, who recruited him to play for Adamson High School beginning in UAAP Season 79 (2016–17 season). Unfortunately, most of their wins that season were forfeited as they fielded an ineligible player in guard Encho Serrano. In his final game for them, he had 11 points.

=== NU Bullpups ===
==== Red-shirt season ====
After that season, Abadiano, along with his teammate Carl Tamayo, followed Coach Monteverde in transferring from Adamson to Nazareth School of National University. Him and Tamayo had to serve residency for Season 80. The NU Bullpups then won tournaments such as the NBTC League (in which he was named Finals Most Outstanding Player), the 2018 Palarong Pambansa (in which he made the Mythical Five along with his teammates Tamayo and Terrence Fortea), and the 2018 ASEAN School Games.

==== Season 81: First championship ====
The Bullpups opened their Season 81 campaign in 2018 with a win over the FEU Baby Tamaraws, in which Abadiano scored 10 points and three assists. In a 50-point blowout win over the UPIS Junior Maroons, he had 14 points, five assists, two rebounds and two steals. He followed that up with 17 points in a 72-point win over the UE Junior Warriors. Against the Ateneo Blue Eaglets, he had 16 points, five rebounds, and two assists to close out the first round of eliminations.

In their rematch against Ateneo in the second round of eliminations, Abadiano scored 16 points and they eventually won again. His performance in that game put him on top of the NBTC UAAP 24 high school rankings. He had a double-double of 20 points and 15 rebounds in a win over the Zobel Junior Archers. They went on to sweep the second round and finished fourth in the NBTC rankings. They met Ateneo again in the Finals, where in Game 2, he was ejected from the game late in the fourth quarter with eight points and nine rebounds. Despite his absence, NU held on to win the juniors' championship for the first time since 2016.

==== Season 82: Second championship ====
Before the start of Season 82, NU successfully defended its NBTC League title, becoming the first back-to-back champions in league history. They also successfully defended their ASEAN School Games title, in which they defeated Indonesia for the gold medal. NU swept the elimination rounds, earning an outright spot in the Finals. NU then swept the Baby Tamaraws in the Finals, with Abadiano contributing in Game 2 with 20 points, five rebounds, five steals and four assists. He finished his high school career with averages of 11.3 points, 3.2 rebounds, 2.3 assists, and 1.1 steals. He also finished 16th in the NBTC 24 rankings.

== College career ==
=== UP Fighting Maroons ===
On August 1, 2020, it was announced that both Abadiano and Tamayo had committed to the UP Fighting Maroons. Several weeks later, their high school coach Monteverde resigned from NU, who was supposed to be the head coach for the senior team of NU. Another former teammate, Cyril Gonzales, left Mapúa to join them at UP. In 2021, two more of Abadiano's former teammates reunited with him at UP, with guards Fortea and Harold Alarcon also committing to UP. That year, Coach Monteverde was named head coach for the Maroons, reuniting him with many of his former players.

==== Rookie season and first UAAP seniors' championship ====
Abadiano made his UAAP seniors' debut in Season 84. In his rookie season, he was the backup point guard to JD Cagulangan, and often played the role of a defensive specialist. He played a crucial role in their semis win over the DLSU Green Archers. This set them up for a best-of-three Finals match against defending champions Ateneo. In Game 3 of the finals, UP won the game with Cagulangan making the game-winning shot. This ended UP's 36-year title drought and made him a champion once again. He also competed in the UAAP 3x3 competition that season.

==== 2022–23: Runner-up finishes ====
Abadiano continued in his role as a defensive stopper and backup to Cagulangan in Season 85. He would occasionally have higher scoring games, such as when he scored 13 points in a win over UE Red Warriors while limiting UE's Kyle Paranada to 4-of-11 shooting. In their semis win over NU, he scored a go-ahead basket, then Cagulangan sealed the win with another three pointer the following play. UP would lose in a finals rematch to Ateneo that season.

Abadiano had offers to transfer to other schools, but he stayed with UP. In Season 86, after missing two games due to concussion protocol, he returned with 13 points, four rebounds, and two assists in a clutch win over DLSU. His midrange jumper with 1:01 left in the game gave UP the lead. In a loss to Ateneo, he had 12 points. A week later, they rematched, this time without lead guards Cagulangan and CJ Cansino due to a hamstring injury and an illness respectively. Abadiano stepped up, and scored a career-high 22 points to lead UP past Ateneo. Once again, UP made the finals, but lost to DLSU.

==== 2024: Second UAAP seniors' championship ====
In the preseason, Abadiano helped UP defend its Filoil EcoOil Preseason Cup title and was also named the tournament's Finals MVP. For Season 87, he was named the team's captain.

UP started the season 6–0. In a win over FEU, he scored a season-high 19 points on six triples while also grabbing four rebounds. That season, he helped UP reach its sixth straight Final Four appearance, and another finals rematch against DLSU. In Game 1 of the finals, he made a clutch midrange jumper and three-pointer to seal the win for UP. He finished that game with nine points and eight rebounds. In Game 2, he scored 16 points, but missed a three-pointer at the buzzer that could have ended the series early, instead setting up a do-or-die game. In Game 3, he had a clutch offensive rebound in the last 44 seconds of the game, and UP hung on to win its second title in four seasons.

==== 2025: Final season ====
In the preseason, Abadiano helped UP win its third straight FilOil EcoOil Preseason Cup title and was also named the tournament's MVP. He was named team captain once again. He, along with Fortea, Alarcon, and NU transferees Janjan Felicilda and Reyland Torres, would be in his final season. With their NU connections, they became known as the "Maroon 5".

Once again UP made the Final Four, guaranteeing their return with a win over Adamson in which he had 16 points. Abadiano then scored 16 of his 18 points in the fourth quarter of their win over Ateneo, mostly on midrange jumpers. The win also gave UP a twice-to-beat advantage for the playoffs. Once again, they faced DLSU in the finals. In Game 2, he had 17 points and scored three clutch midrange jumpers to help UP tie the series and force a deciding Game 3. However, they lost Game 3 as both him and Alarcon were limited by DLSU's defense.

== Professional career ==
On January 17, 2026, Abadiano, along with college teammates Alarcon, Torres, and Fortea, all signed with the San Juan Knights in the MPBL.

On July 8, 2026, the Ulsan Hyundai Mobis Phoebus of the Korean Basketball League (KBL) announced that they have signed in Abadiano for the 2026–27 KBL season.

== National team career ==
=== Junior national team ===
Abadiano first played for the Philippines in the 2018 FIBA Under-17 Basketball World Cup. He had 17 points each in losses to France and Argentina. Against Canada, he led the team with 19 points on 7-of-11 shooting, but they lost by 40 and were relegated to the classification phase. In the Philippines' first win of the tournament, he contributed 15 points as they won over Egypt. He also played in the 2018 FIBA Under-18 Asian Championship.

In 2019, Abadiano played in that year's FIBA Under-19 World Cup. He averaged 8.4 points and 2.1 assists in that tournament. He also represented the Philippines in the 2019 FIBA 3x3 U-18 Asia Cup.
