= Moussa Diakité =

Moussa Diakité may refer to:

- Moussa Diakité (politician) (1927–1985), Guinean politician
- Moussa Kemoko Diakité (born 1940), Guinean film director
- Moussa Diakité (footballer, born 1998), Malian football midfielder
- Moussa Diakité (footballer, born 2003), Malian football midfielder
