= Moussa Kemoko Diakité =

Guinean cinematographer and film director

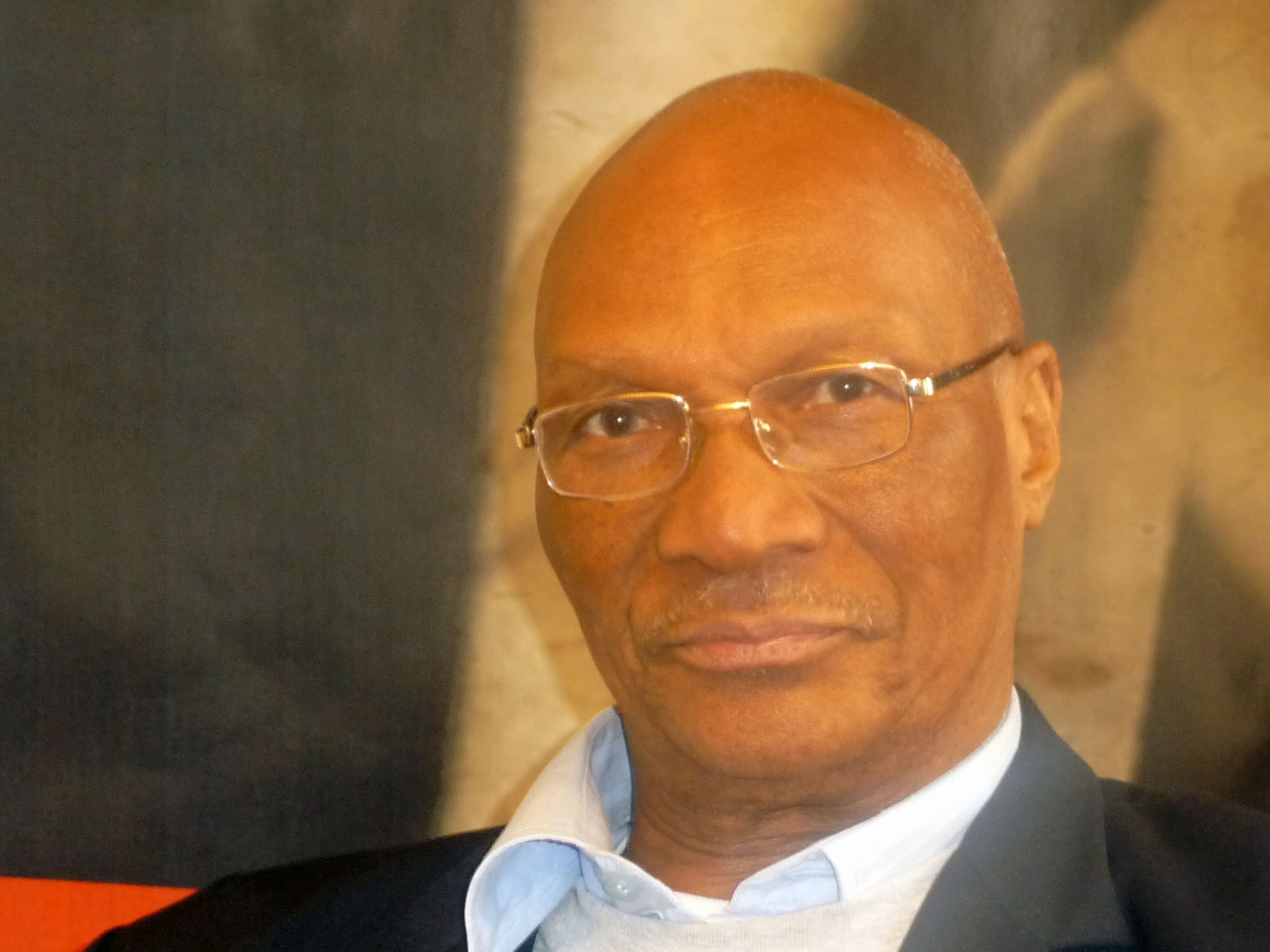
- Moussa Kemoko Diakite in 2011
- Born: 1940 (age 85–86); Mamou
- Occupations: cinematographer and film director

Moussa Kemoko Diakité (born 1940) is a Guinean cinematographer and film director.

== Life ==
Moussa Kemoko Diakité was born in Mamou, and studied drama in Germany. He started by making short documentaries, and his 1970 documentary Hydre dyama won second prize at the 1972 Panafrican Film and Television Festival of Ouagadougou. In 1982 Diakité directed a feature film, Naitou, featuring the Guinean national ballet company.

== Filmography ==
Director

- (with Gerhard Jeutz) Hydre dyama, 1970.
- Les funérailles de Kwame Nkrumah, 1972.
- Hafia, triple champion d'Afrique, 1978.
- Naitou l'orpheline, 1982.

Photography

- (assistant photographer) Wênd Kûuni, 1982.
- (assistant photographer) Issa Le Tisserand, 1984.
- (assistant photographer) yam daabo, 1986.
- (director of photography) Laada, 1991.
- (assistant photographer) Samba Traoré, 1992.
- (director of photography) Vacances au Pays, 2000.

Camera

- (camera assistant) Yaaba, 1989.
- (camera crew) Idrissa Ouedraogo BURKINA-FASO, 2002.
- (2nd camera) Moolaadé, 2004.
- (assistant camera) La Nuit de la Vérité, 2005.

Producer

- L'Enfant noir, 1995.
