= 2025 Filoil EcoOil Preseason Cup =

18th preseason collegiate basketball tournament organized by Filoil EcoOil Sports

18th Filoil EcoOil Preseason Cup

Tournament details
- Country: Philippines
- City: San Juan
- Venue: Playtime Filoil Centre
- Dates: May 18 – July 27, 2025
- Teams: 17
- Defending champions: UP Fighting Maroons

Final positions
- Champions: UP Fighting Maroons (3rd title)
- Runners-up: NU Bulldogs

The 2025 Filoil EcoOil Preseason Cup (also known as the 18th Filoil EcoOil Preseason Cup presented by ABC Tile Adhesive due to sponsorship reasons) was the eighteenth edition of the college basketball tournament organized by Filoil EcoOil Sports. The tournament began on May 18 and ended on July 27, with all games taking place at the Playtime Filoil Centre (formerly known as Filoil EcoOil Centre) in San Juan.

The tournament featured 17 teams from the University Athletic Association of the Philippines (UAAP) and the National Collegiate Athletic Association (NCAA), with the Ateneo Blue Eagles being the only team from either association absent.

The UP Fighting Maroons entered this tournament as the two-time defending Preseason Cup champions.

== Elimination round ==
In the elimination round, the teams are grouped by association. From there, the teams play in a single round-robin tournament. UAAP teams will play six games while NCAA teams play nine. Teams are ranked by win-loss records with the top four teams from each association group advancing to the playoffs.

=== UAAP group ===
==== Team standings ====
| Pos | Team | Pld | W | L | PF | PA | PD | PCT | GB |
|---|---|---|---|---|---|---|---|---|---|
| 1 | De La Salle Green Archers | 6 | 6 | 0 | 171 | 146 | +25 | 1.000 | — |
| 2 | UST Growling Tigers | 6 | 4 | 2 | 207 | 205 | +2 | .667 (Note: UST wins tiebreaker over UP by head-to-head match-up (90–81).) | 2 |
| 3 | UP Fighting Maroons | 6 | 4 | 2 | 345 | 316 | +29 | .667 | 2 |
| 4 | NU Bulldogs | 6 | 3 | 3 | 217 | 224 | −7 | .500 (Note: NU wins tiebreaker over FEU by head-to-head match-up (91–77).) | 3 |
| 5 | FEU Tamaraws | 6 | 3 | 3 | 211 | 195 | +16 | .500 | 3 |
| 6 | Adamson Soaring Falcons | 6 | 1 | 5 | 109 | 134 | −25 | .167 | 5 |
| 7 | UE Red Warriors | 6 | 0 | 6 | 195 | 235 | −40 | .000 | 6 |

Updated to match(es) played on June 2, 2025. Source: Standings via StatsHub PH

==== Results ====
| Team | Game | | | | | |
| Team | 1 | 2 | 3 | 4 | 5 | 6 |
|---|---|---|---|---|---|---|
| Adamson Soaring Falcons (AdU) | DLSU; 47–65 | UST; 62–69 | FEU; 66–68 | UE; 71–67 | NU; 46–61 | UP; 54–63 |
| De La Salle Green Archers (DLSU) | AdU; 65–47 | UP; 106–99 | NU; 69–64 | FEU; 90–66 | UE; 100–91 | UST; 94–86 |
| FEU Tamaraws (FEU) | UE; 74–57 | UST; 72–63 | UP; 65–75 | AdU; 68–66 | DLSU; 66–90 | NU; 77–91 |
| NU Bulldogs (NU) | UST; 71–75 | UP; 74–82 | UE; 72–67 | DLSU; 64–69 | AdU; 61–46 | FEU; 91–77 |
| UE Red Warriors (UE) | FEU; 57–74 | UP; 71–89 | NU; 67–72 | AdU; 67–71 | UST; 65–71 | DLSU; 91–100 |
| UP Fighting Maroons (UP) | NU; 82–74 | UE; 89–71 | DLSU; 99–106 | UST; 81–90 | FEU; 75–65 | AdU; 63–54 |
| UST Growling Tigers (UST) | NU; 75–71 | AdU; 69–62 | FEU; 63–72 | UP; 90–81 | UE; 71–65 | DLSU; 86–94 |

Updated to match(es) played on June 2, 2025. Source: Standings via StatsHub PH
Legend: Blue = win; Red = loss

=== NCAA group ===
==== Team standings ====
| Pos | Team | Pld | W | L | PF | PA | PD | PCT | GB |
|---|---|---|---|---|---|---|---|---|---|
| 1 | Letran Knights | 9 | 8 | 1 | 222 | 206 | +16 | .889 (Note: Letran wins tiebreaker over Benilde by head-to-head match-up (68–58).) | — |
| 2 | Benilde Blazers | 9 | 8 | 1 | 308 | 277 | +31 | .889 | — |
| 3 | EAC Generals | 9 | 6 | 3 | 150 | 134 | +16 | .667 (Note: EAC wins tiebreaker over Arellano by head-to-head match-up (66–64).) | 2 |
| 4 | Arellano Chiefs | 9 | 6 | 3 | 141 | 151 | −10 | .667 | 2 |
| 5 | Perpetual Altas | 9 | 5 | 4 | 139 | 150 | −11 | .556 | 3 |
| 6 | San Beda Red Lions | 9 | 4 | 5 | 125 | 121 | +4 | .444 (Note: San Beda wins tiebreaker over Mapúa by head-to-head match-up (73–72).) | 4 |
| 7 | Mapúa Cardinals | 9 | 4 | 5 | 196 | 182 | +14 | .444 | 4 |
| 8 | JRU Heavy Bombers | 9 | 3 | 6 | 146 | 138 | +8 | .333 | 5 |
| 9 | Lyceum Pirates | 9 | 1 | 8 | 206 | 242 | −36 | .111 | 7 |
| 10 | San Sebastian Stags | 9 | 0 | 9 | 173 | 205 | −32 | .000 | 8 |

Updated to match(es) played on June 2, 2025. Source: Standings via StatsHub PH

==== Results ====
| Team | Game | | | | | | | | |
| Team | 1 | 2 | 3 | 4 | 5 | 6 | 7 | 8 | 9 |
|---|---|---|---|---|---|---|---|---|---|
| Arellano Chiefs (AU) | CSJL; 68–72 | CSB; 73–79 | UPHSD; 68–66 | EAC; 64–66 | MU; 76–73 | SBU; 73–70 | LPU; 78–76 | SSC–R; 92–76 | JRU; 82–60 |
| Letran Knights (CSJL) | AU; 72–68 | LPU; 89–69 | MU; 61–69 | EAC; 81–72 | UPHSD; 80–65 | CSB; 68–58 | JRU; 84–73 | SSC–R; 75–68 | SBU; 75–68 |
| Benilde Blazers (CSB) | MU; 58–56 | AU; 79–73 | UPHSD; 92–72 | JRU; 79–76 | SSC–R; 81–52 | CSJL; 58–68 | SBU; 102–64 | EAC; 86–85 | LPU; 100–93 |
| EAC Generals (EAC) | SSC–R; 68–60 | LPU; 82–74 | CSJL; 72–81 | MU; 71–64 | JRU; 75–71 | UPHSD; 77–52 | AU; 66–64 | SBU; 66–70 | CSB; 85–86 |
| JRU Heavy Bombers (JRU) | SSC–R; 70–59 | CSB; 76–79 | EAC; 71–75 | CSJL; 73–84 | MU; 68–76 | UPHSD; 64–65 | LPU; 71–64 | SBU; 75–74 | AU; 60–82 |
| Lyceum Pirates (LPU) | MU; 63–71 | CSJL; 69–89 | EAC; 74–82 | SSC–R; 84–70 | JRU; 64–71 | AU; 76–78 | UPHSD; 79–94 | SBU; 70–76 | CSB; 93–100 |
| Mapúa Cardinals (MU) | CSB; 56–58 | LPU; 71–63 | CSJL; 69–61 | EAC; 64–71 | SSC–R; 77–70 | JRU; 76–68 | AU; 73–76 | SBU; 72–73 | UPHSD; 55–63 |
| San Beda Red Lions (SBU) | UPHSD; 58–67 | SSC–R; 67–54 | AU; 70–73 | JRU; 74–75 | MU; 73–72 | CSB; 64–102 | EAC; 70–66 | LPU; 76–70 | CSJL; 68–75 |
| San Sebastian Stags (SSC–R) | JRU; 59–70 | EAC; 60–68 | SBU; 54–67 | LPU; 70–84 | CSB; 52–81 | MU; 70–77 | UPHSD; 61–75 | CSJL; 68–75 | AU; 76–92 |
| Perpetual Altas (UPHSD) | CSB; 72–92 | SBU; 67–58 | CSJL; 65–80 | AU; 66–68 | EAC; 52–77 | SSC–R; 75–61 | JRU; 65–64 | LPU; 94–79 | MU; 63–55 |

Updated to match(es) played on June 2, 2025. Source: Standings via StatsHub PH
Legend: Blue = win; Red = loss

== Playoffs ==
The playoffs began on July 11, 2025 with the crossover quarterfinals, where the first-seeded teams play the fourth-seeded team from the opposing association group, same goes for the second-seeded and third-seeded teams.

Quarterfinals
U1 | La Salle | 95
N4 | Arellano | 77
N2 | Benilde | 80
U3 | UP | 82
N1 | Letran | 77
U4 | NU | 79
U2 | UST | 82
N3 | EAC | 73

Semifinals
U1 | La Salle | 78
U3 | UP | 83
U4 | NU | 96
U2 | UST | 84

Finals
U3 | UP | 79
U4 | NU | 65

Legend

- U1, U2, U3, U4 – The teams from the UAAP group
- N1, N2, N3, N4 – The teams from the NCAA group

=== Quarterfinals ===
July 11
10:00 am

Boxscore

| Benilde Blazers | 80–82 | UP Fighting Maroons |
Scoring by quarter: 19–21, 22–29, 20–15, 19–17
| Pts: Allen Liwag 22; Rebs: Allen Liwag 12; Asts: three players 3 | | Pts: Gerry Abadiano 24; Rebs: Jalen Stevens 10; Asts: three players 3 |

Playtime Filoil Centre, San Juan

July 11
12:00 pm

Boxscore

| Letran Knights | 77–79 | NU Bulldogs |
Scoring by quarter: 20–28, 19–21, 21–15, 17–15
| Pts: Jonathan Manalili 18; Rebs: Jonathan Manalili 7 Asts: Jonathan Manalili 8 | | Pts: Jake Figueroa 21; Rebs: Kenshin Pardones 8 Asts: Reinhard Jumamoy 4 |

Playtime Filoil Centre, San Juan

July 11
2:00 pm

Boxscore

| UST Growling Tigers | 82–73 | EAC Generals |
Scoring by quarter: 25–14, 21–26, 16–10, 20–23
| Pts: Angelo Crisostomo 17; Rebs: Angelo Crisostomo 13; Asts: Kyle Paranada 5 | | Pts: EJ Castillo 14; Rebs: Gelo Loristo 7 Asts: Joshua Tolentino 6 |

Playtime Filoil Centre, San Juan

July 11
4:00 pm

Boxscore

| De La Salle Green Archers | 95–77 | Arellano Chiefs |
Scoring by quarter: 24–25, 29–23, 19–14, 23–15
| Pts: Mason Amos 15; Rebs: Kean Baclaan 10; Asts: Jacob Cortez 6 | | Pts: T-Mc Ongotan 17; Rebs: King Vinoya, Troy Valencia 7 Asts: Yuan Camay 5 |

Playtime Filoil Centre, San Juan

=== Semifinals ===
July 13
2:00 pm

Boxscore

| NU Bulldogs | 96–84 | UST Growling Tigers |
Scoring by quarter: 22–28, 21–25, 34–18, 19–13
| Pts: Jake Figueroa 24; Rebs: PJ Palacielo, Reinhard Jumamoy 7 Asts: Jake Figueroa 5 | | Pts: Angelo Crisostomo 21; Rebs: Angelo Crisostomo, Peter Osang 9 Asts: Nicael Cabañero 4 |

Playtime Filoil Centre, San Juan

July 13
4:00 pm

Boxscore

| UP Fighting Maroons | 83–78 | De La Salle Green Archers |
Scoring by quarter: 15–21, 16–24, 25–11, 27–22
| Pts: Ray-Adrian Remogat 14; Rebs: Francis Nnoruka 16; Asts: Harold Alarcon 5 | | Pts: Jacob Cortez 16; Rebs: Michael Phillips 14; Asts: Kean Baclaan 8 |

Playtime Filoil Centre, San Juan

=== Finals ===
July 27
5:30 pm

Boxscore

| NU Bulldogs | 65–79 | UP Fighting Maroons |
Scoring by quarter: 21–27, 16–21, 12–22, 16–9
| Pts: Jake Figueroa 12; Rebs: Jake Figueroa, Omar John 6 Asts: Reinhard Jumamoy, Steve Nash Enriquez 3 | | Pts: Francis Nnoruka 15; Rebs: Francis Nnoruka 12; Asts: TJ Fortea 5 |

Playtime Filoil Centre, San Juan
