= 2023 Filoil EcoOil Preseason Cup =

16th preseason collegiate basketball tournament organized by Filoil EcoOil Sports

16th Filoil EcoOil ECJ Preseason Cup

Tournament details
- Country: Philippines
- City: San Juan
- Venue: Filoil EcoOil Centre
- Teams: 20
- Defending champions: NU Bulldogs

Final positions
- Champions: UP Fighting Maroons (1st title)
- Runners-up: De La Salle Green Archers
- Third place: NU Bulldogs
- Fourth place: Perpetual Altas

The 2023 Filoil EcoOil Preseason Cup, officially referred to as the 16th Filoil EcoOil Preseason Cup, is the sixteenth edition of the collegiate basketball tournament organized by Filoil EcoOil Sports. The tournament was contested by seven teams from the University Athletic Association of the Philippines (UAAP), ten from the National Collegiate Athletic Association (NCAA), and one each from National Athletic Association of Schools, Colleges and Universities (NAASCU), Universities and Colleges Basketball League (UCBL), and National Collegiate Athletic Association – South (NCAA South). All games were held at the Filoil EcoOil Centre in San Juan.

The NU Bulldogs entered this tournament as the defending Preseason Cup champions.

== Elimination round ==
In the elimination round, the teams are grouped by association. From there, the teams play in a single round-robin tournament. Teams in both brackets play nine games each. Teams are ranked by win-loss records with the top four teams from each association group advancing to the playoffs.

=== UAAP group ===
==== Team standings ====
Pos	Team	Pld	W	L	PF	PA	PD	PCT	GB
1	De La Salle Green Archers	9	9	0	0	0	0	1.000	—
2	UP Fighting Maroons	9	7	2	0	0	0	.778	2
3	NU Bulldogs	9	7	2	0	0	0	.778	2
4	FEU Tamaraws	9	5	4	0	0	0	.556	4
5	Adamson Soaring Falcons	9	5	4	0	0	0	.556	4
6	Ateneo Blue Eagles	9	4	5	0	0	0	.444	5
7	St. Clare Saints	9	4	5	0	0	0	.444	5
8	UE Red Warriors	9	3	6	0	0	0	.333	6
9	CEU Scorpions	9	1	8	0	0	0	.111	8
10	FAITH Bravehearts	9	0	9	0	0	0	.000	9

Source: Standings

===== Schedule =====
Team ╲ Game	1	2	3	4	5	6	7	8	9
Adamson	St. Clare school colors	NU school colors	UE school colors	La Salle school colors	UP school colors	CEU school colors	FEU school colors	Ateneo school colors	UV school colors
Ateneo	UP school colors	NU school colors	La Salle school colors	FEU school colors	Adamson school colors	CEU school colors	UE school colors	UV school colors	St. Clare school colors
CEU	UV school colors	UP school colors	La Salle school colors	Adamson school colors	St. Clare school colors	UE school colors	NU school colors	FEU school colors	Ateneo school colors
La Salle	FEU school colors	CEU school colors	Adamson school colors	UP school colors	UE school colors	NU school colors	UV school colors	Ateneo school colors	St. Clare school colors
FAITH	CEU school colors	St. Clare school colors	UP school colors	UE school colors	La Salle school colors	FEU school colors	NU school colors	Adamson school colors	Ateneo school colors
FEU	UP school colors	La Salle school colors	UE school colors	St. Clare school colors	UV school colors	Adamson school colors	Ateneo school colors	CEU school colors	NU school colors
NU	Adamson school colors	La Salle school colors	UE school colors	Ateneo school colors	UP school colors	CEU school colors	St. Clare school colors	UV school colors	FEU school colors
St. Clare	Adamson school colors	UV school colors	UE school colors	FEU school colors	CEU school colors	La Salle school colors	NU school colors	UP school colors	Ateneo school colors
UE	St. Clare school colors	Adamson school colors	UV school colors	FEU school colors	La Salle school colors	NU school colors	CEU school colors	Ateneo school colors	UP school colors
UP	FEU school colors	CEU school colors	UV school colors	Adamson school colors	La Salle school colors	Ateneo school colors	NU school colors	St. Clare school colors	UE school colors

= Win; = OT win; = Win by forfeit; = Loss; = OT loss; = Loss by forfeit

=== NCAA group ===
==== Team standings ====
Pos	Team	Pld	W	L	PF	PA	PD	PCT	GB
1	Perpetual Altas	9	7	2	0	0	0	.778	—
2	Benilde Blazers	9	6	3	0	0	0	.667	1
3	Lyceum Pirates	9	6	3	0	0	0	.667	1
4	Letran Knights	9	6	3	0	0	0	.667	1
5	JRU Heavy Bombers	9	5	4	0	0	0	.556	2
6	Mapúa Cardinals	9	5	4	0	0	0	.556	2
7	San Sebastian Stags	9	4	5	0	0	0	.444	3
8	San Beda Red Lions	9	3	6	0	0	0	.333	4
9	EAC Generals	9	3	6	0	0	0	.333	4
10	Arellano Chiefs	9	0	9	0	0	0	.000	7

Source: Standings

===== Schedule =====
Team ╲ Game	1	2	3	4	5	6	7	8	9
Arellano	EAC school colors	Letran school colors	CSB school colors	Lyceum school colors	UPHD school colors	Mapua school colors	San Beda school colors	SSC-R school colors	JRU school colors
Benilde	SSC-R school colors	EAC school colors	UPHD school colors	Letran school colors	Mapua school colors	Arellano school colors	San Beda school colors	JRU school colors	Lyceum school colors
Letran	SSC-R school colors	CSB school colors	JRU school colors	Arellano school colors	San Beda school colors	Lyceum school colors	EAC school colors	Mapua school colors	UPHD school colors
EAC	CSB school colors	JRU school colors	Arellano school colors	Mapua school colors	San Beda school colors	Lyceum school colors	Letran school colors	SSC-R school colors	UPHD school colors
JRU	Lyceum school colors	EAC school colors	Letran school colors	UPHD school colors	SSC-R school colors	CSB school colors	Mapua school colors	San Beda school colors	Arellano school colors
Lyceum	JRU school colors	Mapua school colors	UPHD school colors	SSC-R school colors	Arellano school colors	Letran school colors	EAC school colors	San Beda school colors	CSB school colors
Mapúa	UPHD school colors	Lyceum school colors	San Beda school colors	CSB school colors	EAC school colors	Arellano school colors	SSC-R school colors	Letran school colors	JRU school colors
San Beda	UPHD school colors	SSC-R school colors	Mapua school colors	Letran school colors	EAC school colors	CSB school colors	Arellano school colors	Lyceum school colors	JRU school colors
San Sebastian	CSB school colors	Letran school colors	San Beda school colors	UPHD school colors	Lyceum school colors	JRU school colors	Mapua school colors	EAC school colors	Arellano school colors
Perpetual	Mapua school colors	San Beda school colors	Lyceum school colors	CSB school colors	SSC-R school colors	JRU school colors	Arellano school colors	EAC school colors	Letran school colors

= Win; = OT win; = Win by forfeit; = Loss; = OT loss; = Loss by forfeit

== Play-in ==
To seal the fourth seed in both the UAAP and NCAA brackets, both Far Eastern University and Colegio de San Juan de Letran had to play a two-game play-in tournament against Jose Maria College Foundation and Guang Ming College, respectively, with the highest aggregate score from each matchup earning the No. 4 seed in the quarterfinals and taking on top seeds University of Perpetual Help System DALTA and De La Salle University.

Both the JMC Kings and Guang Ming Flying Dragons qualified from Luzon and VisMin qualifiers.

UAAP Bracket
U4	FEU	96	90	186
VMQ	JMC	65	80	145

NCAA Bracket
N4	Letran	85	79	164
LQ	Guang Ming	73	84	157

== Playoffs ==
The single-elimination playoffs started on June 14, 2023, with the crossover quarterfinals, where the first-seeded teams play the fourth-seeded team from the opposing association group, same goes for the second-seeded and third-seeded teams.

Quarterfinals
U1	La Salle	101
N4	Letran	79
N2	Benilde	72
U3	NU	88
N1	Perpetual	74
U4	FEU	73
U2	UP	86
N3	Lyceum	66

Semifinals
U1	La Salle	86
U3	NU	73
N1	Perpetual	69
U2	UP	104

Championship game
U1	La Salle	76
U2	UP	87
Battle for Third
U3	NU	85
N1	Perpetual	77

Legend

- U1, U2, U3, U4 – The teams from the UAAP group
- N1, N2, N3, N4 – The teams from the NCAA group
