= Davao Occidental Tigers–San Juan Knights rivalry =

Filipino basketball rivalry

- Teams: Davao Occidental Tigers; San Juan Knights
- First meeting: December 18, 2018 (MPBL); Davao Occidental 87, San Juan 75
- Latest meeting: August 8, 2025 (MPBL); San Juan 95, Davao Occidental 79
- Next meeting: TBA

Statistics
- Total meetings: 17
- All-time series: 9–8 (San Juan)
- Longest win streak: Davao Occidental W3
- Current win streak: San Juan W2

Postseason history
- 2019 MPBL finals: San Juan won, 3–2; 2021 MPBL finals: Davao Occidental won, 3–1; 2021 FilBasket Subic Championship semifinals: San Juan won, 1–0

The rivalry between the Davao Occidental Tigers and San Juan Knights has stretched across multiple leagues in the Philippines, most prominently in the Maharlika Pilipinas Basketball League, where the two teams met in the national finals twice in back-to-back seasons (2019 and 2021). The two teams have also faced against each other in other leagues such as FilBasket and the Pilipinas Super League.

As of August 2025, the two teams have played against each other seventeen times, with the Knights leading the series 9–8.

== History ==
=== Maharlika Pilipinas Basketball League ===
The rivalry began during the Maharlika Pilipinas Basketball League's 2018–19 season, when both the Davao Occidental Tigers and San Juan Knights joined as expansion teams. Their first regular season match-up came on December 18, 2018, at Rizal Memorial Colleges in Davao City, with the host Tigers winning the game 87–75. Both teams went on to finish the season with identical 20–5 records as they would meet in that season's national finals. The series went back-and-forth as both teams alternated wins leading to a game 5 at RMC. Heading into the final minute, Davao Occidental was leading by three points, but then Jhonard Clarito scored four consecutive points to give San Juan the lead with only eight seconds left. Emman Calo then attempted a two-point field goal that unfortunately missed, giving San Juan their first MPBL championship.

In the following 2019–20 season, their regular season match-up would come January 18, 2020 at the University of Southeastern Philippines. This time around, it was San Juan who won the game 84–65. Following, a one-year suspension of league play due to the COVID-19 pandemic, the two teams would meet in a rematch for the national finals. In game 4, with Davao Occidental leading 2–1, Mark Yee would make a three-pointer to give Davao Occidental the lead and eventually winning the championship, exacting their revenge against their rivals.

=== Other leagues ===
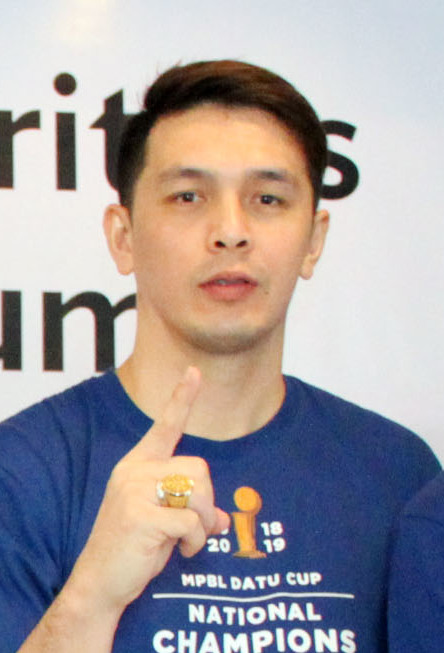
John Wilson is among the players who played for both Davao Occidental and San Juan.

In time for FilBasket's inaugural tournament, the 2021 Subic Championship, the Tigers would sign John Wilson, who won the 2020 MPBL Most Valuable Player award with San Juan. When both teams met in the elimination round on November 8, 2021, the game went to double overtime as Davao Occidental would win the game 120–115. Heading into the playoffs, both teams once again had identical records (7–3) and would even meet in the semifinals of the tournament. San Juan would win in the knockout game, 85–84, to advance to the finals.

The Davao Occidental Tigers would join the Pilipinas Super League in 2022 for the Pearl of the Orient Cup. In the 2022–23 DUMPER Cup, multiple MPBL teams took part during the league's off-season, including the San Juan Knights, who competed as the San Juan Kings. On February 9, 2023, both teams would play in their first professional meeting at RMC, with San Juan winning the game, 76–71. San Juan would go 15–0 while Davao Occidental went 12–3, marking the first time one team had the lead over the other. Both teams wouldn't meet in the playoffs, however, as the Tigers advanced to the finals while the Kings were eliminated in the semifinals by the Pampanga G Lanterns. Their most recent meeting came on February 29, 2024, in the PSL's 2023–24 President's Cup, with Davao Occidental beating San Juan yet again, 75–73.

== Annual finishes ==
League	Season	Davao Occidental				San Juan				Series
League	Season	W	L	PCT	Playoff finish	W	L	PCT	Playoff finish	Series
MPBL	2018–19	20	5	.800	Lost national finals	20	5	.800	Won national finals	3–3
MPBL	2019–20	26	4	.867	Won national finals	26	4	.867	Lost national finals	DVO 3–2
FilBasket	Subic 2021	7	3	.700	Lost semifinals	7	3	.700	Lost finals	1–1
PSL	2022–23	12	3	.800	Lost finals	15	0	1.000	Lost semifinals	SJ 1–0
PSL	2023–24	16	2	.889	Lost quarterfinals	13	5	.722	Lost semifinals	DVO 1–0
MPBL	2024	15	13	.536	Lost division quarterfinals	26	2	.929	Lost division finals	SJ 1–0
MPBL	2025	TBA								

== Game summaries ==
Legend
Davao Occidental win
San Juan win
**Bold** indicates home team

League	Type	Date	Winning team	Score	Losing team	Location	Recap
MPBL	Regular season	December 18, 2018	**Davao Occidental**	87–75	San Juan	Rizal Memorial Colleges	Recap
MPBL	Playoffs	April 11, 2019	San Juan	84–74	**Davao Occidental**	Davao City Recreation Center	Recap
MPBL	Playoffs	April 13, 2019	**Davao Occidental**	67–60	San Juan	Rizal Memorial Colleges	Recap
MPBL	Playoffs	April 16, 2019	**San Juan**	67–62	Davao Occidental	Filoil Flying V Centre	Recap
MPBL	Playoffs	April 22, 2019	Davao Occidental	77–66	**San Juan**	Filoil Flying V Centre	Recap
MPBL	Playoffs	April 25, 2019	San Juan	87–86	**Davao Occidental**	Rizal Memorial Colleges	Recap
MPBL	Regular season	January 18, 2020	San Juan	84–65	**Davao Occidental**	University of Southeastern Philippines	Recap
MPBL	Playoffs	March 17, 2021	Davao Occidental	77–75	San Juan	Subic Bay Gymnasium	Recap
MPBL	Playoffs	March 18, 2021	San Juan	70–65	Davao Occidental	Subic Bay Gymnasium	Recap
MPBL	Playoffs	March 20, 2021	Davao Occidental	66–58	San Juan	Subic Bay Gymnasium	Recap
MPBL	Playoffs	March 21, 2021	Davao Occidental	89–88	San Juan	Subic Bay Gymnasium	Recap
FilBasket	Regular season	November 8, 2021	Davao Occidental	120–115	San Juan	Subic Bay Gymnasium	Recap
FilBasket	Playoffs	November 19, 2021	San Juan	85–84	Davao Occidental	Subic Bay Gymnasium	Recap
PSL	Regular season	February 9, 2023	San Juan	76–71	**Davao Occiental**	Rizal Memorial Colleges	Recap
PSL	Regular season	February 29, 2024	Davao Occidental	75–73	**San Juan**	Filoil EcoOil Centre	Recap
MPBL	Regular season	July 29, 2024	**San Juan**	87–65	Davao Occiental	Filoil EcoOil Centre	Recap
MPBL	Regular season	August 8, 2025	San Juan	95–79	Davao Occidental	Ynares Center	Recap
