= John Wilson (basketball) =

Filipino basketball player

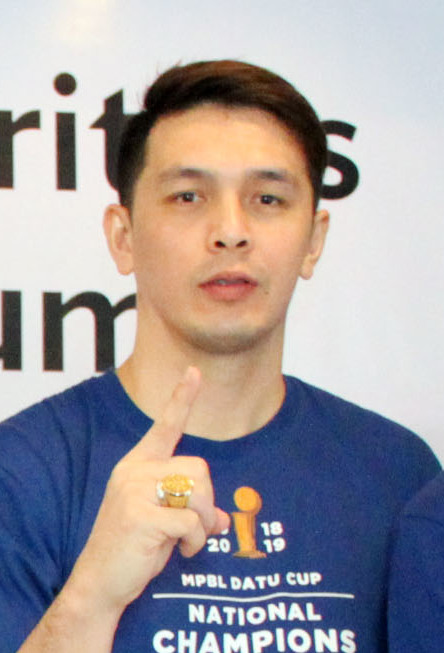

No. 11 – Basilan Steel
- Position: Shooting guard
- League: MPBL

Personal information
- Born: January 18, 1987 (age 39) Binangonan, Rizal, Philippines
- Listed height: 6 ft 2 in (1.88 m)
- Listed weight: 185 lb (84 kg)

Career information
- College: JRU
- PBA draft: 2010: 1st round, 7th overall pick
- Drafted by: Barangay Ginebra Kings
- Playing career: 2010–present

Career history
- 2010–2012: Barangay Ginebra Kings
- 2012–2013: Air21 Express
- 2013–2015: Meralco Bolts
- 2015–2016: NLEX Road Warriors
- 2016–2017: Phoenix Fuel Masters
- 2018: Barangay Ginebra San Miguel
- 2018−2021: San Juan Knights
- 2021: Clarin Sto. Niño
- 2021–2023: Davao Occidental Tigers
- 2023–2024: GenSan / South Cotabato Warriors
- 2024–2025: Nueva Ecija Rice Vanguards
- 2026–present: Basilan Steel

Career highlights
- PBA All-Defensive Team (2011); PBA All-Rookie Team (2011); MPBL champion (2019); MPBL Most Valuable Player (2020); All-MPBL First Team (2020); All-MPBL Second Team (2019); 3x MPBL All-Star (2020, 2023, 2026); PSL champion (2022); PSL Most Valuable Player (2023); All-PSL Super Five (2023); NCAA Philippines MVP (2009)

John Marion Raymundo Wilson (born January 18, 1987) is a Filipino professional basketball player for the Basilan Steel of the Maharlika Pilipinas Basketball League (MPBL).

Wilson played college ball with José Rizal University where he won MVP honors in 2009 (Season 85). He was then drafted by the Barangay Ginebra Kings in 2010 PBA draft where he was selected into both the All-Defensive and All-Rookie Teams in 2011. He would play in the PBA until 2018.

He earned much success in his post-PBA career, after joining the second incarnation of the San Juan Knights in the Maharlika Pilipinas Basketball League (MPBL). He won Most Valuable Player in 2020, two All-MPBL Team selections, and two all-star appearances. He also won MVP honors in the Pilipinas Super League in 2023 as well as a Super Five selection.

== PBA career ==
Wilson was drafted by the Barangay Ginebra Kings seventh overall in the 2010 PBA draft.

On August 23, 2012, Wilson was traded to the Air21 Express. The trade was a part of a three team trade that involved Barangay Ginebra, Air21, and San Miguel Beermen.

On July 17, 2013, he, along with Nonoy Baclao, were traded Air21 to the Meralco Bolts in exchange for Carlo Sharma and Vic Manuel.

On May 22, 2015, he was traded by Meralco to GlobalPort Batang Pier in exchange for Kelly Nabong and then he shipped to the NLEX Road Warriors in exchange for NLEX's 2016 second-round pick.

== Post-PBA career ==
=== San Juan Knights (2018–2021) ===
On June 20, 2018, Wilson would make the move to the Maharlika Pilipinas Basketball League, where he would play for the San Juan Knights. During his first stint in the MPBL, Wilson would become the first player in the league to reach the 1,000-point milestone. This goes alongside his two All-MPBL team selections, an all-star appearance in 2020. He also won the MPBL Most Valuable Player award for the 2019–20 season. Wilson is also a key player to both of San Juan's National Finals appearances in 2019 and 2020/21, where he won a championship during the former season.

=== Davao Occidental Tigers (2021–2023) ===
After two seasons with SJK and a short stint with Clarin Sto. Niño of VisMin, Wilson would transfer to the Davao Occidental Tigers, one of San Juan's rival teams. As the Tigers joined the Pilipinas Super League, so did Wilson, who in his two seasons with the team, won a championship in the Pearl of the Orient Cup, win Most Valuable Player in the succeeding DUMPER Cup, as well as a selection to the PSL's Super Five that same season.

=== GenSan/South Cotabato Warriors (2023–2024) ===
Wilson rejoined the MPBL for the 2023 season, this time with the GenSan Warriors. He would earn his second all-star selection and lead the team to its first playoff series win in the North Division quarterfinals against the Muntinlupa Cagers.

=== Nueva Ecija Rice Vanguards (2024–2026) ===
During the free agency and trade window of the 2024 MPBL season, the now-South Cotabato Warriors released Wilson. On June 14, 2024, he would sign with the Nueva Ecija Rice Vanguards.

== Career statistics ==
Legend
GP	Games played	MPG	Minutes per game
FG%	Field-goal percentage	3P%	3-point field-goal percentage	FT%	Free-throw percentage
RPG	Rebounds per game	APG	Assists per game	SPG	Steals per game
BPG	Blocks per game	PPG	Points per game	**Bold**	Career high

As of the 2024 MPBL season, May 22, 2024

=== PBA ===
Year	Team	GP	MPG	FG%	3P%	FT%	RPG	APG	SPG	BPG	PPG
2010–11	Barangay Ginebra	33	14.3	.412	**.364**	.588	2.9	.8	.3	.1	5.3
2011–12	Barangay Ginebra	30	9.7	.281	.172	.875	1.5	.6	.2	.1	2.1
2012–13	Air21 / Meralco	**43**	**20.4**	.412	.331	.670	3.6	1.1	.6	**.2**	8.3
2013–14	Meralco	31	19.5	**.434**	.359	.680	**3.9**	1.3	.7	**.2**	**8.5**
2014–15	Meralco / NLEX	35	18.7	.359	.311	.811	2.9	**1.7**	**.9**	.0	5.9
2015–16	NLEX / Phoenix	13	11.5	.424	.361	.333	1.5	.5	.2	**.2**	4.9
2016–17	Phoenix	28	10.1	.385	.333	.714	2.0	.3	.4	.0	4.0
2017–18	Barangay Ginebra	5	4.6	.000	.000	**1.000**	.4	.0	.0	.0	.4
Career		218	13.6	.338	.279	.709	2.3	.8	.5	.1	4.9

=== MPBL ===
Year	Team	GP	GS	MPG	FG%	3P%	FT%	RPG	APG	SPG	BPG	PPG
2018–19	San Juan	36	28	24.1	.399	.307	.809	**6.6**	2.4	1.4	0.3	13.8
2019–20	San Juan	**41**	**39**	**27.6**	**.421**	**.381**	**.813**	6.5	**2.5**	**2.4**	**0.4**	**19.3**
2023	General Santos	32	32	26.6	.387	.321	.797	5.5	**2.5**	1.2	0.2	16.1
2024	South Cotabato	9	7	19.2	.388	.362	.774	4.9	1.7	0.9	0.1	11.9
Source: John Wilson via Genius Sports (MPBL)
