= 2023–24 Pilipinas Super League season =

3rd tournament of the Pilipinas Super League

- League: Pilipinas Super League
- Sport: Basketball
- Duration: Regular season: November 9, 2023 – March 16, 2024; Playoffs: March 18 – April 4, 2024; Finals: April 9–16, 2024
- Number of games: 171 (regular season)
- Number of teams: 19
- TV partner(s): Television: IBC; TAP Sports; Blast Sports; Streaming: FiberTV, Blast TV; Online: Bola.TV, Pilipinas Super League (Facebook), PSL TV (YouTube)

Regular season
- Top seed: Biñan Tatak Gel

Finals
- Champions: Quezon Titans
- Runners-up: Nueva Ecija Capitals
- Finals MVP: Judel Fuentes

PSL seasons
- ← 2022–23 2024–25 →

The 2023–24 Pilipinas Super League season, also known as the President's Cup, was the third season of the Pilipinas Super League (PSL) Pro Division. The regular season began on November 9, 2023 with the opening ceremonies at the Smart Araneta Coliseum in Quezon City and ended on March 16, 2024. The playoffs then began two days later on March 18, 2024 and ended on April 16, 2024 with the Quezon Titans winning their first league championship against the Nueva Ecija Capitals in a four-game series, with Judel Fuentes was named as the Finals MVP.

This is the first professional tournament with Cris Bautista as president and Allan Caidic as commissioner. The former previously served as commissioner of the Pilipinas VisMin Super Cup.

== Teams ==
In the lead-up to the President's Cup, the league gradually revealed the teams that would take part in the tournament. The Benilde Blazers, backed by Strong Group Athletics, are the league's first collegiate representatives.

Team	Locality	Previous tournament	Best result
AO Jikiri Indanan Sulu Kings (Note: Entered the tournament as AO Kings; originally lacking a locality.)	Indanan, Sulu	New team	
Bicol Spicy Oragons	Bicol Region	2022–23 DUMPER Cup	7th place (2022)
Biñan Tatak Gel	Biñan, Laguna	New team	
Caloocan Supremos	Caloocan	2022–23 DUMPER Cup (Note: Participated as the Batang Kankaloo Koolers.)	Quarterfinalist (2022–23)
Cam Norte Warriors	Camarines Norte	New team	
CV Siniloan Daruma Dragons	Siniloan, Laguna	New team	
Davao Occidental Tigers	Davao Occidental	2022–23 DUMPER Cup	Champion (2022)
JT Bulacan Taipan	Bulacan	New team	
Manila CityStars	Manila	2022–23 DUMPER Cup	Quarterfinalist (2022–23)
MisOr Mustangs	Misamis Oriental	New team	
1Munti XUR Homes	Muntinlupa	2022–23 DUMPER Cup	12th place (2022–23)
NKT Sniper (Note: Entered the tournament as Cainta NKT Sniper; originally based in Cainta, Rizal.)	—	New team	
Novaliches QC Warriors	Novaliches, Quezon City	New team	
Nueva Ecija Capitals	Nueva Ecija	New team	
Quezon Titans	Quezon	New team	
RCP–Shawarma Shack Demigods (Note: Entered the tournament as Pola Disipliandos; originally based in Pola, Oriental Mindoro.)	—	New team	
San Juan Kings	San Juan	2022–23 DUMPER Cup	Semifinalist (2022–23)
San Pedro – Pablo EscoBets (Note: Entered the tournament as Kyusi Pablo EscoBets; originally based in Quezon City.)	San Pedro, Laguna	New team	
Strong Group Athletics – Benilde Blazers	Manila	New team	

== Venues ==
Locations of venues within Metro Manila (Special venues are marked by a yellow pog)	Locations of venues outside Metro Manila (Special venues are marked by a yellow pog)

Regular venues
Venue	Location	Capacity
Alonte Sports Arena	Biñan, Laguna	6,500
Caloocan Sports Complex	Caloocan	2,500
Central Recreation and Fitness Center	Quezon City	N/A
Filoil EcoOil Centre	San Juan	6,000
Novadeci Convention Center	Quezon City	N/A
Paco Arena	Manila	1,000
PhilSports Arena	Pasig	10,000
Ynares Sports Arena	Pasig	3,000

Special venues
Venue	Location	Capacity
Opening ceremonies
Smart Araneta Coliseum	Quezon City	20,000
Out-of-town venues
Nueva Ecija Coliseum	Palayan, Nueva Ecija	3,000
Quezon Convention Center	Lucena, Quezon	7,000

== Opening ceremonies ==
The opening ceremonies took place at the Smart Araneta Coliseum in Quezon City. Bamboo headlined the special performance with guest Yukii Takahashi. The opening game saw the Manila CityStars beating the Cainta NKT Sniper.

== Regular season ==
The regular season began on November 9, 2023.

=== Format ===
Like the previous tournament, every team will compete in a single round-robin format, playing against all other teams once. The top sixteen teams will advance to the playoffs.

=== Standings ===
Pos	Team	Pld	W	L	PCT	GB	Qualification
1	Biñan Tatak Gel	18	17	1	.944	—	Twice-to-beat in First Round
2	San Juan Kings	18	16	2	.889 (Note: San Juan wins tiebreaker over Nueva Ecija by head-to-head victory.)	1	Twice-to-beat in First Round
3	Nueva Ecija Capitals	18	16	2	.889	1	Twice-to-beat in First Round
4	Caloocan Supremos	18	14	4	.778 (Note: Caloocan wins tiebreaker over Quezon by head-to-head victory.)	3	Twice-to-beat in First Round
5	Quezon Titans	18	14	4	.778	3	Twice-to-beat in First Round
6	Davao Occidental Tigers	18	13	5	.722	4	Twice-to-beat in First Round
7	Strong Group Athletics – Benilde Blazers	18	12	6	.667	5	Twice-to-beat in First Round
8	1Munti XUR Homes	18	11	7	.611	6	Twice-to-beat in First Round
9	San Pedro Pablo Escobets	18	9	9	.500	8	Twice-to-win in First Round
10	JT Bulacan Taipan	18	8	10	.444 (Note: Bulacan wins tiebreaker over Misamis Oriental by head-to-head victory.)	9	Twice-to-win in First Round
11	MisOr Mustangs	18	8	10	.444	9	Twice-to-win in First Round
12	Novaliches QC Warriors	18	7	11	.389	10	Twice-to-win in First Round
13	AO Kings – Jikiri Indanan Sulu	18	6	12	.333	11	Twice-to-win in First Round
14	Manila CityStars	18	5	13	.278 (Note: Manila wins tiebreaker over Camarines Norte by head-to-head victory.)	12	Twice-to-win in First Round
15	Cam Norte Warriors	18	5	13	.278	12	Twice-to-win in First Round
16	RCP–Shawarma Shack Demigods	18	4	14	.222	13	Twice-to-win in First Round
17	CV Siniloan Daruma Dragons	18	3	15	.167	14	
18	NKT Sniper	18	2	16	.111	15	
19	Bicol Spicy Oragons	18	1	17	.056	16	

Source: Standings – via Genius Sports
Rules for classification: 1) Winning percentage; 2) Head-to-head standings; 3) Head-to-head point differential; 4) Head-to-head points scored; 5) Overall point differential; 6) Overall points scored.

=== Results table ===
Team	Game																	
Team	1	2	3	4	5	6	7	8	9	10	11	12	13	14	15	16	17	18
Benilde Blazers (CSB)	IND; 69–55	QZN; 75–77	CMN; 113–97	CAL; 57–71	SP; 86–78	MSO; 68–62*	NKT; 107–77	SJ; 66–89	SIN; 112–90	BCL; 86–66	NE; 81–86	MUN; 97–74	RCP; 76–64	BIN; 46–67	MNL; 95–84	BUL; 70–66	DVO; 76–82	NOV; 95–73
Bicol (BCL)	SIN; 98–100	BIN; 62–84	MNL; 85–80	SJ; 75–92	MUN; 93–95	DVO; 96–110	NE; 81–123	SP; 76–114	MSO; 63–82	IND; 80–81	CSB; 66–86	QZN; 81–98	CMN; 105–115	BUL; 64–78	CAL; 72–119	NKT; 81–98	RCP; 92–106	NOV; 79–102
Biñan (BIN)	BUL; 64–48	CMN; 95–66	MUN; 86–67	BCL; 84–62	MSO; 84–70	SIN; 92–61	RCP; 105–77	SP; 92–54	MNL; 110–75	QZN; 66–63	IND; 85–56	NE; 96–90	NKT; 125–79	SJ; 74–78	CSB; 67–46	NOV; 101–76	CAL; 84–69	DVO; 93–79
Bulacan (BUL)	RCP; 71–66	IND; 72–58	BIN; 48–64	NE; 67–109	NOV; 65–69	QZN; 53–81	CAL; 73–75	NKT; 104–61	MSO; 76–56	SIN; 92–56	SJ; 72–77	MNL; 65–51	DVO; 73–75	MUN; 73–84	BCL; 78–64	CMN; 82–85	CSB; 66–70	SP; 83–77
Caloocan (CAL)	CMN; 82–74	IND; 73–59	RCP; 71–61	NE; 63–76	SP; 96–67	BUL; 75–73	SJ; 77–69	CSB; 71–57	NOV; 66–69	DVO; 89–81	MNL; 88–84	MUN; 69–76	MSO; 96–74	SIN; 116–93	BCL; 119–72	BIN; 69–84	NKT; 100–69	QZN; 68–66
Camarines Norte (CMN)	MNL; 77–80	NKT; 98–92	CAL; 74–82	BIN; 66–95	SJ; 84–98	MSO; 80–88	SIN; 94–98	CSB; 97–113	NE; 90–111	MUN; 75–76	IND; 85–88	NOV; 102–100	BCL; 115–105	DVO; 88–122	BUL; 85–82	RCP; 86–78	QZN; 75–105	SP; 120–132
Davao Occidental (DVO)	IND; 87–88	MUN; 85–78	MNL; 75–71	QZN; 68–90	NE; 91–102*	RCP; 79–72	BCL; 110–96	SP; 101–79	CAL; 81–89	NOV; 86–71	SIN; 104–79	NKT; 114–80	BUL; 75–73	CMN; 122–88	SJ; 75–73	CSB; 82–76	MSO; 75–68	BIN; 79–93
Indanan (IND)	DVO; 88–87	NOV; 68–66	BUL; 58–72	NKT; 76–73	CAL; 59–73	NE; 77–81	SP; 70–75	MUN; 81–87	CSB; 55–69	SJ; 64–86	BIN; 56–85	BCL; 81–80	CMN; 88–85	QZN; 78–87	SIN; 106–102	MSO; 83–95	RCP; 89–99	MNL; 118–121
Manila (MNL)	NKT; 68–67	CMN; 80–77	DVO; 71–75	QZN; 61–67	MSO; 60–69	BCL; 80–85	SP; 84–92	NOV; 72–92	BIN; 75–110	NE; 62–85	SIN; 72–67	RCP; 68–66	BUL; 51–65	CAL; 84–88	SJ; 64–88	CSB; 84–95	MUN; 81–87*	IND; 121–118
Misamis Oriental (MSO)	MUN; 69–82	MNL; 69–60	NOV; 75–74	SP; 86–89	BIN; 70–84	CMN; 88–80	RCP; 124–111**	BUL; 56–76	SIN; 101–84	BCL; 82–63	CSB; 62–68*	NE; 79–105	NKT; 75–65	CAL; 96–74	IND; 95–83	SJ; 77–84	QZN; 63–87	DVO; 68–75
Muntinlupa (MUN)	NKT; 79–72	DVO; 78–85	MSO; 82–69	RCP; 77–76	BIN; 67–86	NE; 73–92	NOV; 79–73	BCL; 95–93	IND; 87–81	SJ; 71–59	CMN; 76–75	SP; 71–75	CAL; 76–69	CSB; 74–97	BUL; 84–73	QZN; 50–90	SIN; 97–93	MNL; 87–81*
NKT Sniper (NKT)	MNL; 67–68	MUN; 72–79	CMN; 92–98	IND; 73–76	QZN; 72–93	SJ; 85–109	NOV; 76–96	BUL; 61–104	SIN; 95–97	RCP; 76–77	CSB; 77–107	BIN; 79–125	MSO; 65–75	DVO; 80–114	NE; 81–90	BCL; 98–81	SP; 118–116*	CAL; 69–100
Novaliches (NOV)	RCP; 69–58	IND; 66–68	BUL; 69–65	MSO; 74–75	NKT; 96–76	MUN; 73–79	NE; 74–96	MNL; 92–72	SIN; 81–73	SJ; 62–85	CAL; 69–66	SP; 73–98	DVO; 76–81	CMN; 100–102	QZN; 71–78	BIN; 76–101	CSB; 73–95	BCL; 102–79
Nueva Ecija (NE)	BUL; 109–67	IND; 81–77	DVO; 102–91*	CAL; 76–63	MUN; 92–73	SIN; 100–85	NOV; 96–74	RCP; 100–73	BCL; 123–81	MNL; 85–62	CMN; 111–90	BIN; 90–96	MSO; 105–79	CSB; 86–81	SP; 127–86	NKT; 90–81	QZN; 87–85	SJ; 73–83
Quezon (QZN)	MNL; 67–61	NKT; 93–72	DVO; 90–68	SP; 88–70	SIN; 102–76	BUL; 81–53	SJ; 88–92	CSB; 77–75	BIN; 63–66	RCP; 66–57	IND; 87–78	BCL; 98–81	NOV; 78–71	MUN; 90–50	NE; 85–87	MSO; 87–63	CMN; 105–75	CAL; 66–68
RCP–Shawarma Shack (RCP)	NOV; 58–69	BUL; 66–71	CAL; 61–71	MUN; 76–77	SJ; 57–121	SIN; 94–87	DVO; 72–79	BIN; 77–105	NE; 73–100	MSO; 111–124**	NKT; 77–76	MNL; 66–68	QZN; 57–66	CSB; 73–64	SP; 78–85	CMN; 78–86	IND; 99–89	BCL; 106–92
San Juan (SJ)	RCP; 121–57	NKT; 109–85	CMN; 98–84	BCL; 92–75	QZN; 92–88	CAL; 69–77	IND; 86–64	NOV; 85–62	MUN; 71–59	BUL; 77–72	SIN; 111–82	CSB; 89–66	SP; 98–64	MNL; 88–64	BIN; 78–74	DVO; 73–75	MSO; 84–77	NE; 83–73
San Pedro (SP)	QZN; 70–88	MSO; 89–86	CAL; 67–96	IND; 75–70	MNL; 92–84	SIN; 77–74	BIN; 54–92	DVO; 79–101	BCL; 114–79	CSB; 78–86	NOV; 98–73	MUN; 75–71	SJ; 64–98	NE; 86–127	RCP; 85–78	NKT; 116–118*	BUL; 77–83	CMN; 132–120
Siniloan (SIN)	BCL; 100–98	QZN; 76–102	RCP; 87–94	NE; 85–100	BIN; 61–92	SP; 74–77	NOV; 73–81	CMN; 98–94	NKT; 97–95	MSO; 84–101	BUL; 56–92	MNL; 67–72	SJ; 82–111	CSB; 90–112	DVO; 79–104	ND; 102–106	CAL; 93–116	MUN; 93–97

Source: Schedule – via Genius Sports
Legend: Blue = win; Red = loss; Matches with lighter background shading were decided after overtime. (*) Number of asterisks denotes number of overtime periods

=== Postponed games ===
The Novaliches–Manila game, originally scheduled for November 18, 2023, was initially cancelled due to technical issues at the Novadeci Convention Center. The game was later rescheduled to January 8, 2024 and moved to the Filoil EcoOil Centre.

== Playoffs ==
The playoffs began on March 18, 2024. The playoffs expanded for the second consecutive time, doubling its size to sixteen teams. The First Round and Quarterfinals give twice-to-beat advantage to the higher-seeded team. The Semifinals will be a best-of-three series and the Finals will utilize a best-of-five format.

=== Bracket ===
Teams in bold advanced to the next round. Teams in italics have twice-to-beat advantage (only for the First Round and Quarterfinals). The numbers to the left indicate team's seeding. Number of asterisks denotes number of overtime periods.

First Round (twice-to-beat)
**1**	**Biñan**	**93**
16	RCP–Shawarma Shack	62
**8**	**1Munti**	**97**
9	San Pedro	91
**4**	**Caloocan**	**115**
13	AO–Indanan	69
**5**	**Quezon**	**107**
12	Novaliches	72
**2**	**San Juan**	**122**
15	Camarines Norte	81
**7**	**SGA–CSB**	64	**87**
10	Bulacan	**66**	83
**3**	**Nueva Ecija**	**89**
14	Manila	77
**6**	**Davao Occidental**	**92**
11	Misamis Oriental	78

Quarterfinals (twice-to-beat)
**1**	**Biñan**	**63**
8	1Munti	58
4	Caloocan	74	54
**5**	**Quezon**	80**	**56**
**2**	**San Juan**	**85**
7	SGA–CSB	77
**3**	**Nueva Ecija**	86	**89**
6	Davao Occidental	**90**	82

Semifinals (best-of-three)
1	Biñan	61	67
**5**	**Quezon**	**85**	**86**
2	San Juan	86	83
**3**	**Nueva Ecija**	**95**	**86**

Finals (best-of-five)
**5**	**Quezon**	91	**83**	**75**	**77**
3	Nueva Ecija	**94**	75	68	64
Third place playoff
1	Biñan	56
**2**	**San Juan**	**76**

==== First round ====
Team 1	Agg.	Team 2	1st leg	2nd leg
(1) Biñan Tatak Gel	**1**–0	(16) RCP–Shawarma Shack Demigods	**93**–62	—
(2) San Juan Kings	**1**–0	(15) Cam Norte Warriors	**122**–81	—
(3) Nueva Ecija Capitals	**1**–0	(14) Manila CityStars	**89**–77	—
(4) Caloocan Supremos	**1**–0	(13) AO Jikiri Indanan Sulu Kings	**115**–69	—
(5) Quezon Titans	**1**–0	(12) Novaliches QC Warriors	**107**–72	—
(6) Davao Occidental Tigers	**1**–0	(11) MisOr Mustangs	**92**–78	—
(7) Strong Group Athletics–Benilde Blazers	**1**–1	(10) JT Bulacan Taipan	64–**66**	**87**–83
(8) 1Munti XUR Homes	**1**–0	(9) San Pedro Pablo Esobets	**97**–91	—

==== (1) Biñan vs. (16) RCP–Shawarma Shack ====
IBC

March 18
4:00pm

Boxscore

**Biñan Tatak Gel**	**93**–62	RCP–Shawarma Shack Demigods
Scoring by quarter: **23**–15, **29**–16, **15**–12, **24**–19
Pts: Michael Maestre 13; Rebs: KG Canaleta, Michael Maestre 7 Asts: JJ Pido 10		Pts: Khenn Osicos 16; Rebs: Khenn Osicos 9 Asts: Paulo Hubalde 9

Filoil EcoOil Centre, San Juan

==== (2) San Juan vs. (15) Camarines Norte ====
IBC

March 19
8:00pm

Boxscore

**San Juan Kings**	**122**–81	Cam Norte Warriors
Scoring by quarter: **23**–12, **35**–19, **23**–18, **41**–32
Pts: Joseph Ubalde 20; Rebs: Agem Miranda 7 Asts: Agem Miranda 11		Pts: James Martinez 37; Rebs: Wowie Escosio 4 Asts: James Martinez 8

Paco Arena, Manila

==== (3) Nueva Ecija vs. (14) Manila ====
IBC

March 19
4:00pm

Boxscore

**Nueva Ecija Capitals**	**89**–77	Manila CityStars
Scoring by quarter: **20**–19, 23–**27**, **22**–19, **24**–12
Pts: Will McAloney 15; Rebs: Michael Juico 9 Asts: Christopher Bitoon 7		Pts: Macky Acosta 22; Rebs: Kyle Neypes 7 Asts: Marcy Arellano 11

Paco Arena, Manila

==== (4) Caloocan vs. (13) AO–Indanan ====
IBC

March 21
4:00pm

Boxscore

AO Jikiri Indanan Sulu Kings	69–**115**	**Caloocan Supremos**
Scoring by quarter: 21–**24**, 20–**33**, 18–**32**, 10–**26**
Pts: Andrian Celada 22; Rebs: Mark Doligon 7 Asts: Mark Doligon 7		Pts: Romel Calahat 17; Rebs: Jessie Sumoda 7 Asts: Joco Tayongtong 9

Filoil EcoOil Centre, San Juan

==== (5) Quezon vs. (12) Novaliches ====
IBC

March 21
6:00pm

Boxscore

Novaliches QC Warriors	72–**107**	**Quezon Titans**
Scoring by quarter: 20–**34**, 19–**20**, 20–**29**, 13–**24**
Pts: Deo Timajo 17; Rebs: Chrisjohn Dabbay, Paolo Galvez 7 Asts: Paolo Galvez 6		Pts: Rodel Gravera 20; Rebs: three players 4 Asts: LJ Gonzales 7

Filoil EcoOil Centre, San Juan

==== (6) Davao Occidental vs. (11) Misamis Oriental ====
IBC

March 19
6:00pm

Boxscore

MisOr Mustangs	78–**92**	**Davao Occidental Tigers**
Scoring by quarter: 19–**24**, 16–**19**, 17–**23**, 26–26
Pts: Reynel Hugnatan 17; Rebs: Kint Ariar 13; Asts: Kint Ariar, Paul Desiderio 6		Pts: Ryan Costelo 18; Rebs: Reigo Gamalinda 6 Asts: Tony Ynot 7

Paco Arena, Manila

==== (7) SGA–CSB vs. (10) JT Bulacan ====
March 18
6:00pm

Boxscore

**JT Bulacan Taipan**	**66**–64	Strong Group Athletics–Benilde Blazers
Scoring by quarter: 12–**18**, **23**–15, 10–**16**, **21**–15
Pts: Kenji Roman 12; Rebs: Jason Ballesteros 11; Asts: Alex Desoyo 4		Pts: Paul Turco 11; Rebs: Paul Turco 9 Asts: Gab Cometa 5
**Bulacan forces do-or-die**

Filoil EcoOil Centre, San Juan

IBC

March 21
8:00pm

Boxscore

**Strong Group Athletics–Benilde Blazers**	**87**–83	JT Bulacan Taipan
Scoring by quarter: **19**–17, **27**–19, 17–**22**, 24–**25**
Pts: Anton Eusebio, Matthew Oli 19; Rebs: Anton Eusebio, Paul Turco 8 Asts: Ian Torres 7		Pts: Camillus Altamirano 21; Rebs: Jonas Tibayan 8 Asts: Camillus Altamirano 4
**SGA–CSB wins series in two games**

Filoil EcoOil Centre, San Juan

==== (8) 1Munti vs. (9) San Pedro ====
IBC

March 18
8:00pm

Boxscore

San Pedro Pablo Escobets	91–**97**	**1Munti XUR Homes**
Scoring by quarter: 17–**25**, **31**–21, 14–**28**, **29**–23
Pts: Andrew Estrella 24; Rebs: three players 7 Asts: Allan Mangahas 6		Pts: John Catimbuhan 32; Rebs: Harold Arboleda 12; Asts: Harold Arboleda 9

Filoil EcoOil Centre, San Juan

==== Quarterfinals ====
Team 1	Agg.	Team 2	1st leg	2nd leg
**(1) Biñan Tatak Gel**	**1**–0	(8) 1Munti XUR Homes	**63**–58	—
**(2) San Juan Kings**	**1**–0	(7) Strong Group Athletics–Benilde Blazers	**85**–77	—
**(3) Nueva Ecija Capitals**	**1**–1	(6) Davao Occidental Tigers	86–**90**	**89**–82
(4) Caloocan Supremos	0–**2**	**(5) Quezon Titans**	74–**80** (2OT)	54–**56**

==== (1) Biñan vs. (8) 1Munti ====
IBC

March 25
6:00pm

Boxscore

**Biñan Tatak Gel**	**63**–58	1Munti XUR Homes
Scoring by quarter: **22**–15, **18**–17, 15–**21**, **8**–5
Pts: Kenny Rocacurva 12; Rebs: KG Canaleta 12; Asts: JJ Pido 4		Pts: John Catimbuhan 16; Rebs: Harold Arboleda 8 Asts: Harold Arboleda 8

Paco Arena, Manila

==== (2) San Juan vs. (7) SGA–CSB ====
IBC

March 23
8:00pm

Boxscore

**San Juan Kings**	**85**–77	Strong Group Athletics–Benilde Blazers
Scoring by quarter: **27**–15, **23**–18, 17–**23**, 18–**21**
Pts: Orlan Wamar 16; Rebs: Zach Huang 6 Asts: three players 5		Pts: Joshua Cajucom 15; Rebs: Paul Turco 6 Asts: Mark Sangco 6

Filoil EcoOil Centre, San Juan

==== (3) Nueva Ecija vs. (6) Davao Occidental ====
IBC

March 23
6:00pm

Boxscore

**Davao Occidental Tigers**	**90**–86	Nueva Ecija Capitals
Scoring by quarter: **29**–25, 15–**24**, **24**–14, 22–**23**
Pts: Theo Flores 14; Rebs: Kelly Nabong 9 Asts: Ryan Costelo 7		Pts: Will McAloney 17; Rebs: Will McAloney 12; Asts: Chris Bitoon, Michael Juico 6
**Davao Occidental forces do-or-die**

Filoil EcoOil Centre, San Juan

IBC

March 26
6:00pm

Boxscore

**Nueva Ecija Capitals**	**89**–82	Davao Occidental Tigers
Scoring by quarter: **23**–21, 21–**24**, **26**–19, **19**–18
Pts: Robby Celiz 24; Rebs: Robby Celiz 11; Asts: Chris Bitoon 9		Pts: Kurt Lojera 15; Rebs: Michael Cañete, Tony Ynot 6 Asts: Tony Ynot 5
**Nueva Ecija wins series in two games**

Filoil EcoOil Centre, San Juan

==== (4) Caloocan vs. (5) Quezon ====
IBC

March 25
8:00pm

Boxscore

**Quezon Titans**	**80**–74 (2OT)	Caloocan Supremos
Scoring by quarter: **19**–13, 12–**13**, 17–**20**, 12–**14**, Overtime: **20**–14
Pts: LJ Gonzales 18; Rebs: LJ Gonzales 10; Asts: Judel Fuentes, Thomas Torres 4		Pts: Damian Lasco 14; Rebs: Gabby Espinas, Reil Cervantes 9 Asts: Irven Palencia, Joco Tayongtong 3
**Quezon forces do-or-die**

Paco Arena, Manila

IBC

March 26
8:00pm

Boxscore

Caloocan Supremos	54–**56**	**Quezon Titans**
Scoring by quarter: **18**–17, **17**–12, 5–**17**, **13**–10
Pts: Reil Cervantes 10; Rebs: Gabby Espinas, Jeramer Cabanag 7 Asts: Joco Tayongtong 3		Pts: Judel Fuentes 12; Rebs: Ximone Sandagon 8 Asts: Judel Fuentes 3
**Quezon wins series**

Filoil EcoOil Centre, San Juan

==== Semifinals ====
Team 1	Series	Team 2	Game 1	Game 2	Game 3
(1) Biñan Tatak Gel	0–**2**	**(5) Quezon Titans**	61–**85**	67–**86**	—
(2) San Juan Kings	0–**2**	**(3) Nueva Ecija Capitals**	86–**95**	83–**86**	—

==== (1) Biñan vs. (5) Quezon ====
IBC

April 2
8:00pm

Boxscore

Biñan Tatak Gel	61–**85**	**Quezon Titans**
Scoring by quarter: 13–**24**, 15–**17**, 10–**21**, 23–23
Pts: Jumboy Estrada 14; Rebs: KG Canaleta 8 Asts: three players 3		Pts: Will Gozum 15; Rebs: Will Gozum 5 Asts: Christopher Lagrama 5
**Quezon leads series, 1–0**

Alonte Sports Arena, Biñan, Laguna

IBC

April 4
6:00pm

Boxscore

**Quezon Titans**	**86**–67	Biñan Tatak Gel
Scoring by quarter: **18**–8, **22**–19, **27**–21, 19–19
Pts: LJ Gonzales 18; Rebs: three players 4 Asts: Christopher Lagrama, Judel Fuentes 4		Pts: Kenny Rocacurva 14; Rebs: Kenny Rocacurva 8 Asts: Jaymark Mallari, Jimboy Estrada 4
**Quezon wins series, 2–0**

Filoil EcoOil Centre, San Juan

==== (2) San Juan vs. (3) Nueva Ecija ====
IBC

April 2
6:00pm

Boxscore

**Nueva Ecija Capitals**	**95**–86	San Juan Kings
Scoring by quarter: **23**–14, **24**–22, **35**–19, 13–**31**
Pts: Byron Villarias 15; Rebs: Billy Ray Robles 9 Asts: Emman Calo 6		Pts: JM Galinato 21; Rebs: Dexter Maiquez 10; Asts: Orlan Wamar 11
**Nueva Ecija leads series, 1–0**

Alonte Sports Arena, Biñan, Laguna

IBC

April 4
8:00pm

Boxscore

San Juan Kings	83–**86**	**Nueva Ecija Capitals**
Scoring by quarter: **33**–18, 15–**24**, 9–**28**, **26**–16
Pts: Michael Calisaan 15; Rebs: Michael Calisaan 14; Asts: Orlan Wamar 13		Pts: Will McAloney 18; Rebs: Will McAloney 9 Asts: Chris Bitoon 10
**Nueva Ecija wins series, 2–0**

Filoil EcoOil Centre, San Juan

=== Battle for Third ===
==== (1) Biñan vs. (2) San Juan ====
IBC

April 9
6:00pm

Boxscore

Biñan Tatak Gel	56–**76**	**San Juan Kings**
Scoring by quarter: 14–**15**, **24**–17, 10–**34**, 8–**10**
Pts: Jaymar Gimpayan 13; Rebs: Poypoy Actub 10; Asts: Jaymark Mallari 5		Pts: AC Soberano 17; Rebs: Mike Malonzo 10; Asts: Marwin Taywan 9
**San Juan wins Battle for Third**

Nueva Ecija Coliseum, Palayan, Nueva Ecija

=== Finals ===
Team 1	Series	Team 2	Game 1	Game 2	Game 3	Game 4	Game 5
(3) Nueva Ecija Capitals	1–**3**	**(5) Quezon Titans**	**94**–91	75–**83**	68–**75**	64–**77**	—

==== (3) Nueva Ecija vs. (5) Quezon ====
IBC

April 9
8:00pm

Boxscore

**Nueva Ecija Capitals**	**94**–91	Quezon Titans
Scoring by quarter: **27**–12, 20–**31**, 19–**21**, **28**–27
Pts: Robby Celiz 18; Rebs: Chris Bitoon 7 Asts: Chris Bitoon 12		Pts: Judel Fuentes, LJ Gonzales 19; Rebs: LJ Gonzales, RJ Minerva 7 Asts: Alvin Abundo 6
**Nueva Ecija leads series, 1–0**

Nueva Ecija Coliseum, Palayan, Nueva Ecija

IBC

April 11
7:30pm

Boxscore

**Quezon Titans**	**83**–75	Nueva Ecija Capitals
Scoring by quarter: 11–**20**, **25**–19, **31**–15, 16–**21**
Pts: Judel Fuentes 17; Rebs: RJ Minerva 9 Asts: LJ Gonzales 5		Pts: Nathaniel Cosejo 21; Rebs: Nathaniel Cosejo 11; Asts: Chris Bitoon 7
**Series tied, 1–1**

Nueva Ecija Coliseum, Palayan, Nueva Ecija

IBC

April 13
7:30pm

Boxscore

Nueva Ecija Capitals	68–**75**	**Quezon Titans**
Scoring by quarter: **19**–17, 18–**21**, 14–**19**, 17–**18**
Pts: Chris Bitoon 21; Rebs: Chris Bitoon 8 Asts: Chris Bitoon, Robby Celiz 5		Pts: Judel Fuentes 23; Rebs: LJ Gonzales 7 Asts: LJ Gonzales 6
**Quezon leads series, 2–1**

Quezon Convention Center, Lucena, Quezon

IBC

April 16
7:30pm

Boxscore

**Quezon Titans**	**77**–64	Nueva Ecija Capitals
Scoring by quarter: **22**–10, 12–**23**, **26**–21, **17**–10
Pts: Judel Fuentes 15; Rebs: RJ Minerva 8 Asts: Christopher Lagrama, LJ Gonzales 4		Pts: Emman Calo 14; Rebs: Michael Juico 10; Asts: Chris Bitoon 5
**Quezon wins series, 3–1**

Quezon Convention Center, Lucena, Quezon

== Awards ==
The league's feted the Best Player of the Conference before Game 3 of the Finals series on April 13, 2024 at the Quezon Convention Center in Lucena, Quezon. The Finals Most Valuable Player was later awarded at the conclusion of the series.

Awards	Recipient	Team
Best Player of the Conference	Will McAloney	Nueva Ecija Capitals
Finals Most Valuable Player	Judel Fuentes	Quezon Titans

== Records ==
- December 4, 2023 – The San Juan Kings defeated the RCP–Shawarma Shack Demigods with a score of 121–57. The 64-point margin of victory is the biggest such in PSL history.

== Statistics ==
=== Individual statistical leaders ===
Category	Player	Team	Statistic
Points per game	James Martinez	Cam Norte Warriors	20.7
Rebounds per game	Felix Apreku	San Pedro Pablo Escobets	12.2
Assists per game	Paolo Hubalde	RCP–Shawarma Shack Demigods	7.8
Steals per game	Paolo Hubalde	RCP–Shawarma Shack Demigods	2.3
Blocks per game	Jason Strait	Novaliches QC Warriors	1.9
Fouls per game	JR Olegario	Bicol Spicy Oragons	3.5
Minutes per game	Harold Arboleda	1Munti XUR Homes	32.4
FG%	Shaun Umali	CV Siniloan Daruma Dragons	50.0%
FT%	James Martinez	Cam Norte Warriors	89.5%
3FG%	AC Soberano	San Juan Kings	51.4%

=== Team statistical leaders ===
Category	Team	Statistic
Points per game	Nueva Ecija Capitals	91.8
Rebounds per game	Biñan Tatak Gel	43.0
Assists per game	Nueva Ecija Capitals	29.9
Steals per game	Davao Occidental Tigers	10.4
Blocks per game	Novaliches QC Warriors	4.4

== Junior Division ==
Following the President's Cup, the league will hold its usual Junior Division tournaments. There will be three age groups for the first time: 16-under (labelled as Born 2008), 18-under (labelled as Born 2006), and 14-under (labelled as Born 2004). The regional tournaments will be held throughout May and June, followed by the national championships in July. These tournaments will also double as qualifiers for the league's first Global Championship Challenge, set to begin in July.

== Media coverage ==
The Intercontinental Broadcasting Corporation (IBC) serves as the television broadcast partner for the tournament, succeeding Solar Sports. IBC previously broadcast the 2021 MPBL Invitational in December 2021. For streaming, the league partnered with Converge ICT to broadcast the league on FiberTV and Blast TV, the latter being part of a partnership with TAP DMV.

In addition to broadcasting all games on Facebook and YouTube, Bola.TV is added to the league's online portfolio, which features co-streaming with the platform's own sportscasters.
