= Robby Celiz =

Filipino basketball player (born 1988)

No. 8 – Ilagan Isabela Cowboys
- Position: Shooting guard / small forward

Personal information
- Born: September 7, 1988 (age 38) Cadiz, Negros Occidental, Philippines
- Listed height: 6 ft 3 in (1.91 m)
- Listed weight: 217 lb (98 kg)

Career information
- College: RTU; NU
- PBA draft: 2013: 2nd round, 17th overall pick
- Drafted by: Talk 'N Text Tropang Texters
- Playing career: 2013–present

Career history
- 2013–2014: Talk 'N Text Tropang Texters
- 2014–2015: Blackwater Elite
- 2016–2017: Alab Pilipinas
- 2017: GlobalPort Batang Pier
- 2017–2018: San Miguel Alab Pilipinas
- 2018–2019: Bataan Risers
- 2019–2020: GenSan Warriors
- 2021–2023: Davao Occidental Tigers
- 2023: Makati OKBet Kings
- 2023–2024: Nueva Ecija Capitals/Rice Vanguards
- 2025-2026: Caloocan Batang Kankaloo
- 2026-present: Ilagan Isabela Cowboys

Career highlights
- 2× All-MPBL Second Team (2023, 2024); 4× MPBL All-Star (2020, 2023–2025); PSL champion (2022); PSL Mythical Team (2022); ABL champion (2018)

Robby Cruz Celiz (born September 7, 1988) is a Filipino professional basketball player for the Ilagan Isabela Cowboys of the Maharlika Pilipinas Basketball League (MPBL). He was drafted 17th overall in the 2013 PBA draft by the Tropang Texters. He has played in multiple basketball leagues such as the ASEAN Basketball League (ABL), Maharlika Pilipinas Basketball League (MPBL), and Pilipinas Super League (PSL).

== College career ==
Celiz first played for Rizal Technological University. He didn't think that he would be playing basketball after college. His team won the silver medal in the 2009 Penang Unity Chief Basketball Minister Friendship Cup, with him scoring 31 points with eight threes in the final game of the tournament.

He was then discovered by Eric Altamirano, the coach of the NU Bulldogs at the time. He only played one season there.

== Professional career ==
=== Talk 'n Text Tropang Texters ===
Celiz was selected 17th overall in the 2013 PBA draft by Talk 'n Text. His team made the finals in the 2014 Commissioner's Cup. However, they lost to the San Mig Coffee Mixers, 3–1, despite going on a 13-game winning streak before the finals. He was left unprotected for the expansion draft.

=== Blackwater Elite ===
Celiz was then drafted by the Blackwater Elite in the expansion draft. He scored 11 points in a loss to the NLEX Road Warriors in the 2014–15 Philippine Cup. They had no wins that conference.

=== Alab Pilipinas ===
Celiz then joined other ex-PBA players such as Jeric Fortuna and JR Cawaling among others in playing for Alab Pilipinas. After struggling in his first few games, he found his stroke when he finished with 14 points on 4-of-7 shooting from three in Alab's 87–79 win over the Westports Malaysia Dragons.

Two days later, Celiz played his best game for Alab when he scored 23 points in a 79–77 road loss to Malaysia He scored 17 points on 8-of-14 shooting to lead the locals in a win over the Hong Kong Eastern Long Lions.

=== GlobalPort Batang Pier ===
After his stint with Alab and spending time in the PBA D-League, Celiz signed a deal with the GlobalPort Batang Pier for the rest of the 2017 Governors' Cup.

=== Return to ABL ===
Celiz, along with Ray Parks Jr., and Lawrence Domingo, returned to Alab. His team won the 2017–18 title over the Mono Vampire.

=== Bataan Risers ===
Celiz, along with Alab teammate Pamboy Raymundo, joined the Bataan Risers. In Bataan's 95–85 win over the Imus Bandera, he scored 15 points while hauling down seven rebounds and dishing three assists. His team went on to finish with a league-best 23–2 record. They beat the Caloocan Supremos in the quarterfinals, but lost to the Manila Stars in three games.

=== GenSan Warriors ===
Celiz then joined the GenSan Warriors the following season. He scored a career-high 27 points in an upset win over the previously unbeaten San Juan Knights. He then had 26 points (including the game-winner) in a close win over Imus. In a game against the Pasay Voyagers, he went on a personal 9–0 run which helped GenSan take control of the game and win after trailing for most of that game. He finished that game with 17 points, 11 rebounds, and five assists. In their final game of the regular season, he contributed 23 points and 16 rebounds as the Warriors ended with the 7th seed. Before the playoffs, he contributed 12 points and five rebounds in the South All-Stars' overtime win over the North. He led his team in scoring in both of their playoff games against the Bacoor City Strikers but they still lost.

=== Davao Occidental Tigers ===
In 2021, Celiz was signed by the Davao Occidental Tigers, his third team in the MPBL. During the FilBasket Subic Championship, he almost had a triple-double with 26 points, 14 rebounds and nine assists with three blocks in a double-overtime win over the San Juan Knights. He scored 10 points to help Davao get to the semifinals over Burlington EOG Sports. The Tigers then moved to the PSL.

In the inaugural game of the Pilipinas Super League (PSL), Celiz led his team with a stat line of 16 points, 10 rebounds, and three blocks in a win over the Roxas Vanguards. He then had 20 points, 6 rebounds, 4 assists and 3 blocks in a win over the Cagayan Valley Golden Eagles.

He was set to play for them once again as the rebranded Davao Pilipinas were originally picked to represent the Philippines in the ASEAN Basketball League (ABL). However, those plans fell through and the Zamboanga Valientes became the new Philippine representatives for the ABL.

== Career statistics ==
=== College ===
Year	Team	GP	MPG	FG%	3P%	FT%	RPG	APG	SPG	BPG	PPG
2011–12	NU	9	8.8	.324	.000	.667	1.8	.7	.2	.2	2.7
Career		9	8.8	.324	.000	.667	1.8	.7	.2	.2	2.7

=== PBA ===
Year	Team	GP	MPG	FG%	3P%	FT%	RPG	APG	SPG	BPG	PPG
2013–14	Talk 'N Text	5	4.0	.000	.000	1.000	.4	.2	–	.4	.8
2014–15	Blackwater	24	17.1	.293	.246	.686	1.4	1.2	.2	.3	4.6
2016–17	GlobalPort	5	2.2	.000	.000	.000	.2	.2	–	–	–
Career		34	13.0	.279	.241	.718	1.1	.9	.1	.1	3.4

== National team career ==
In 2013, Celiz, along with Kevin Ferrer, Bacon Austria, and Gio Ciriacruz, represented the Philippines in the 2013 FIBA Asia 3x3 Championship.

== Personal life ==
Celiz has a son, Rob, who currently plays for the NUNS Bullpups.
