= Philippine Super League =

The Philippine Super League may refer to:

- Philippine Super Liga, a non-professional volleyball league
- Pilipinas Super League, a professional basketball league
