= Kyt Jimenez =

Filipino basketball player

Free agent
- Position: Point guard / Shooting guard

Personal information
- Born: March 21, 1997 (age 29) Jeddah, Saudi Arabia
- Listed height: 5 ft 11 in (1.80 m)

Career information
- College: FEU; Perpetual
- PBA draft: 2023: 9th round, 76th overall pick
- Drafted by: San Miguel Beermen
- Playing career: 2022–present

Career history
- 2022: Sarangani Marlins
- 2022–2023: Davao Occidental Tigers
- 2023: GenSan Warriors
- 2023–2024: San Miguel Beermen
- 2025: Sarangani Gripper Motorcycle Tire
- 2026: Iloilo United Royals

Career highlights
- PBA champion (2023–24 Commissioner's); MPBL Rookie of the Year (2022); 2× MPBL All-Star (2022, 2023); PSL All-Star (2023)

Krystoffe "Kyt" Mauricio Jimenez (born March 21, 1997) is a Filipino professional basketball player who last played for the Iloilo United Royals of the Maharlika Pilipinas Basketball League (MPBL). Born in Saudi Arabia, Jimenez played college basketball for FEU and Perpetual before suffering multiple injuries. Jimenez subsequently joined, and gained notoriety, with Mavs Phenomenal Basketball, a basketball development program with a large online following, particularly in YouTube, which paved way for a professional career.

Jimenez made his professional debut in 2022 with the Sarangani Marlins of the Maharlika Pilipinas Basketball League (MPBL) before moving to the GenSan Warriors in 2023. During the PBA season 48 draft, Jimenez was drafted by San Miguel in the ninth round with the 76th overall pick. After signing a two-year deal with the team, he became the lowest draft pick to be signed by a PBA team. He won a championship with the team during his rookie season. However, he was relegated to the unrestricted free agent list, the following season.

Jimenez is just one of three players to achieve a rare quadruple-double in a Philippine professional basketball game, the others being Donbel Belano and Stefanie Berberabe.

== College career ==
In college, Kyt Jimenez first played for the FEU Tamaraws before moving to the Perpetual Altas. During his Perpetual stint, however, Jimenez suffered multiple injuries.

== Professional career ==
=== Sarangani Marlins and the quaruple-double (2022) ===
On April 25, 2022, he would make his professional debut during the opening gameday of the Maharlika Pilipinas Basketball League's 2022 season. Playing for the Sarangani Marlins, Jimenez scored 22 points on top of seven rebounds and four assists to give Sarangani the win over Valenzuela XUR Homes Realty Inc. Jimenez would go on to become an all-star starter during the 2022 MPBL All-Star Game.

On October 10, 2022, in a game against the Mindoro Tams, Jimenez recorded 33 points, 13 rebounds, 11 assists, and 11 steals, achieving the elusive quadruple-double. It was the first and currently only time that occurred in the MPBL and only the second time in all of Philippine professional basketball.

Jimenez led Sarangani to the third seed in the South, but the run was cut short by an upset sweep from the Rizal Golden Coolers during the division quarterfinals of the 2022 MPBL playoffs. Jimenez would go on to win the inaugural MPBL Rookie of the Year award after averaging 17.2 points, 7.9 rebounds, 4.7 assists, and 2.5 steals per game.

=== Davao Occidental Tigers (2022–2023) ===
Jimenez then made his way to the Pilipinas Super League, competing with the Davao Occidental Tigers.

=== GenSan Warriors (2023) ===
The following season, Jimenez returned to the MPBL, but now with the GenSan Warriors. He was selected for his second all-star appearance for the 2023 MPBL All-Star Game, also as a starter.

=== San Miguel Beermen (2023–2024) ===
On September 17, 2023, during the season 48 draft of the Philippine Basketball Association, Jimenez was selected with the 76th overall pick by the San Miguel Beermen. On September 27, he signed a two-year deal with San Miguel, making him the lowest drafted pick to sign a contract with a PBA team. In his first game against the Meralco Bolts, Jimenez suffered a fracture after getting hit, sidelining him indefinitely. He would still go on to win a championship following San Miguel's victory over the Magnolia Hotshots in the 2023–24 Commissioner's Cup finals. Before the start of the 2024 Philippine Cup, Jimenez suffered a freak accident causing an arm laceration, which rendered him unable to compete in the Greats vs. Stalwarts game of the 2024 PBA All-Star Weekend where he was set to be a team captain.

=== Zamboanga Valientes (2025) ===
In November 2024, Jimenez was relegated to the unrestricted free agent list ahead of the 2024–25 PBA Commissioner's Cup, but still had one year remaining in his contract. However, he ended up playing for the Zamboanga Valientes during the 34th Dubai International Basketball Championship and Gov. Hofer Invitational Tournament. Because of this, Jimenez was granted a ban from the PBA for playing in other leagues without clearance, though he is given the opportunity to appeal the ban.

=== Return to Sarangani (2025) ===
Following his ban from the PBA, Jimenez will make a return to the Sarangani Marlins for the 2025 MPBL season.

== Career statistics ==
=== PBA ===
Legend
GP	Games played	MPG	Minutes per game	FG%	Field-goal percentage
3FG%	3-point field-goal percentage	4P%	4-point field-goal percentage	FT%	Free-throw percentage
RPG	Rebounds per game	APG	Assists per game	SPG	Steals per game
BPG	Blocks per game	PPG	Points per game	**127**	Career high

As of the end of 2024–25 season

==== Season-by-season averages ====
Year	Team	GP	MPG	FG%	3P%	4P%	FT%	RPG	APG	SPG	BPG	PPG
2023–24	San Miguel	2	**8.1**	.000	.000	—	1.000	1.0	—	1.0	—	2.0
2024–25	San Miguel	**3**	5.0	**.300**	.000	.250	—	1.0	**.3**	—	—	**2.7**
Career		5	6.2	.214	.000	.250	1.000	1.0	.2	.4	—	2.4

=== MPBL ===
Legend
GP	Games played	GS	Games started	MPG	Minutes per game
FG%	Field-goal percentage	3P%	3-point field-goal percentage	FT%	Free-throw percentage
RPG	Rebounds per game	APG	Assists per game	SPG	Steals per game
BPG	Blocks per game	PPG	Points per game	**Bold**	Career high

As of the end of 2023 season

==== Season-by-season averages ====
Year	Team	GP	GS	MPG	FG%	3P%	FT%	RPG	APG	SPG	BPG	PPG
2022	Sarangani	20	**18**	**29.0**	.353	.294	**.763**	**7.9**	**4.7**	**2.8**	**0.5**	**17.2**
2023	General Santos	**23**	10	16.0	**.386**	**.301**	.588	4.8	3.4	1.4	0.3	6.7
