= 2023 MPBL All-Star Game =

4th edition of the MPBL All-Star Game

North All-Stars	South All-Stars
99	91
Head coach: Dennis Pineda (Pampanga Giant Lanterns)	Head coach: Alex Angeles (Bacoor City Strikers)
	1	2	3	4	Total
North All-Stars	31	24	15	29	99
South All-Stars	21	19	28	23	91
- Date: September 16, 2023
- Venue: Bataan People's Center, Balanga, Bataan
- MVP: Justine Baltazar
- Network: Cignal TV (One PH, MPTV)

The 2023 MPBL All-Star Game was an exhibition game played on September 16, 2023, during the 2023 season of the Maharlika Pilipinas Basketball League (MPBL). It was the fourth edition of the MPBL All-Star Game, which took place at the Bataan People's Center in Balanga, Bataan, the home arena of the Bataan Risers.

The North Division won against the South Division for the first time with a score of 99–91. Justine Baltazar was declared the All-Star Game MVP.

== All-Star Game ==
=== Coaches ===
The two coaches of each division's highest-ranked team up to that point coached the all-star rosters of their respective divisions. On September 1, 2023, it was revealed that Governor Dennis Pineda of the Pampanga Giant Lanterns would coach the North All-Stars, and Alex Angeles of the Bacoor City Strikers would coach the South All-Stars.

=== Lineups ===
The South Division reserves were announced on September 9, 2023. Former MVP John Wilson of the GenSan Warriors earned his second all-star selection alongside Marco Balagtas of the Muntinlupa Cagers, the latter joined teammate and first-time all-star JL Delos Santos. CJ Catapusan and Renzo Navarro both made their all-star debuts for Iloilo while Lucena mayor Mark Alcala earned his first selection for Quezon. Bacoor City's James Kwekuteye, Batangas City's Mark Neil Cruz, Imus's Jimboy Estrada, and Zamboanga's Joseph Gabayni also earned their first all-star selections.

The South Division starters were announced on September 10, 2023. Kyt Jimenez of the GenSan Warriors and reigning MVP Jaycee Marcelino of the Zamboanga Family's Brand Sardines started for the second straight season after earning their second all-star selections. Starters that also made their first appearance in the All-Star Game include Bacoor City's Michael Cañete, Batangas City's Jeckster Apinan, and Imus's Poypoy Actub.

The North Division reserves were announced on September 11, 2023. Troy Mallillin of the Rizal Golden Coolers made his second all-star appearance alongside teammate Jboy Gob, who made his first all-star appearance. Representing the hosting Bataan Risers was first-time all-star Yves Sazon. All joining the All-Star Game for the first time were Bulacan's Rence Alcoriza, Makati's Emman Calo, Marikina's Felipe Chavez, Nueva Ecija's Roi Sumang, Pasig City's Jason Ballesteros and Ryan Costello, and San Juan's Adrian Nocum.

The North Division starters were announced on September 12, 2023. Robby Celiz of the Makati OKBet Kings and Will McAloney of the Nueva Ecija Rice Vanguards made their second all-star appearance, with the former also earning his first starter selection. The Pampanga duo of Justine Baltazar and Encho Serrano made their all-star debuts alongside San Juan's Orlan Wamar Jr.

The South Division replacements were announced on September 15, 2023. Jhan Nermal of the Bacoor City Strikers started in place of injured teammate Michael Cañete. Iloilo's CJ Catapusan opted out for personal reasons and was replaced by teammate Josh Flores as a reserve. Muntinlupa's John Amores took the reserve spot of JL Delos Santos due to the latter's collegiate commitments with José Rizal University.

North All-Stars
Pos	Player	Team	No. of selections
Starters
	Justine Baltazar	Pampanga Giant Lanterns	1
	Robby Celiz	Makati OKBet Kings	2
	Will McAloney	Nueva Ecija Rice Vanguards	2
	Encho Serrano	Pampanga Giant Lanterns	1
	Orlan Wamar Jr.	San Juan Knights	1
Reserves
	Rence Alcoriza	Bulacan Kuyas	1
	Jason Ballesteros	Pasig City MCW Sports	1
	Emman Calo	Makati OKBet Kings	1
	Felipe Chavez	Marikina Shoemasters	1
	Ryan Costello	Pasig City MCW Sports	1
	Jboy Gob	Rizal Golden Coolers	1
	Troy Mallillin	Rizal Golden Coolers	2
	Adrian Nocum	San Juan Knights	1
	Yves Sazon	Bataan Risers	1
	Roi Sumang	Nueva Ecija Rice Vanguards	1
Head coach: Dennis Pineda (Pampanga Giant Lanterns)

South All-Stars
Pos	Player	Team	No. of selections
Starters
	Poypoy Actub	Imus SV Squad	1
	Jeckster Apinan	Batangas City Embassy Chill	1
	Kyt Jimenez	GenSan Warriors	2
	Jaycee Marcelino	Zamboanga Family's Brand Sardines	2
	Jhan Nermal (Note: Michael Cañete was initially announced as a starter but was replaced by Jhan Nermal due to injury.)	Bacoor City Strikers	1
Reserves
	Mark Alcala	Quezon Huskers	1
	John Amores (Note: JL Delos Santos was initially announced as a reserve but was replaced by John Amores due to collegiate commitments.)	Muntinlupa Cagers	
	Marco Balagtas	Muntinlupa Cagers	2
	Mark Neil Cruz	Batangas City Embassy Chill	1
	Jimboy Estrada	Imus SV Squad	1
	Josh Flores (Note: CJ Catapusan was initially announced as a reserve but was replaced by Josh Flores due to personal reasons.)	Iloilo United Royals	1
	Joseph Gabayni	Zamboanga Family's Brand Sardines	1
	James Kwekuteye	Bacoor City Strikers	1
	Renzo Navarro	Iloilo United Royals	1
	John Wilson	GenSan Warriors	2
Head coach: Alex Angeles (Bacoor City Strikers)

=== Game ===
One PH
MPTV

September 16

North All-Stars	99–91	South All-Stars
Scoring by quarter: 31–21, 24–19, 15–28, 29–23

Bataan People's Center, Balanga, Bataan

== Pre-game events ==
=== Executives' Game ===
MPBL founder Manny Pacquiao won his second Executives' Game MVP award as the South Executives defeated the North Executives, 114–63.

North Executives
Representative	Team
Lavin Castro	Pasay Voyagers
Xandrei Cruz	Rizal Golden Coolers
Ronnie Dojillo	Caloocan Batang Kankaloo
Don Dulay	Makati OKBet Kings
Jinggoy Estrada	San Juan Knights
Aurelio Gonzales III	Pampanga Giant Lanterns
Alfonso Kaw	Nueva Ecija Rice Vanguards
Cezar Mancao	Manila Stars
Jett Nisay	Bataan Risers
Voltaire Ora	Valenzuela XUR Homes Realty Inc.
Richard Rosales	Pasig City MCW Sports
JC Tan	Quezon City Toda Aksyon
Elvis Tolentino	Marikina Shoemasters
Jemal Vizcarra	Parañaque Patriots
Rhonz Yuzon	Bulacan Kuyas
Head coach: Francis Ocampo (Rizal Golden Coolers)

South Executives
Representative	Team
Ross Alvarez	Bacolod City of Smiles
Emmanuel Anonuevo	Laguna Krah Asia
Nini Arquiza	Zamboanga Family's Brand Sardines
Marlou Aquino	Bacoor City Strikers
Jojo Cunanan	Imus SV Squad
Mermann Flores	GenSan Warriors
Kaizer Galvez	Muntinlupa Cagers
John Gilbor	Negros Muscovados
Jay Javelosa	Iloilo United Royals
Ralph Lim	Quezon Huskers
Manny Pacquiao	N/A (MPBL founder)
Ruel Pacquiao	Sarangani Marlins
Gerry Tee	Batangas City Embassy Chill
Bengie Teodoro	Mindoro Disiplinados
Denzel Wong	Bicol Volcanoes
Head coach: Cris Conwi (Bacoor City Strikers)

Media Pilipinas TV

September 16

North Executives	63–114	South Executives

Bataan People's Center, Balanga, Bataan

=== Three-Point Shooutout ===
Contestants
Player	Team	First round	Final round
Orlan Wamar Jr.	San Juan Knights	21	20
Domark Matillano	Bacolod City of Smiles	17	18
Robbie Manalang	Pasig City MCW Sports	19	14
Levi Hernandez	Batangas City Embassy Chill	16	DNQ
Jonathan Uyloan	Nueva Ecija Rice Vanguards	16	DNQ
Al Francis Tamsi	Quezon Huskers	15	DNQ
Joshua Santos	Bataan Risers	14	DNQ
Enzo Joson	GenSan Warriors	13	DNQ
James Castro	Bataan Risers	12	DNQ
John Umali	Parañaque Patriots	12	DNQ
Jeramer Cabanag	Caloocan Batang Kankaloo	10	DNQ
Jayson Apolonio	Pampanga Giant Lanterns	7	DNQ
Val Acuña	Muntinlupa Cagers	DNP	

Notes

- Player highlighted in gold is the event's defending champion.
- Players highlighted in green are contestants from the hosting team.

=== Slam Dunk Showdown ===
Contestants
Player	Team	First round	Final round
CJ Gania	Pampanga Giant Lanterns	89 (41+48)	50
Justine Guevarra	Bulacan Kuyas	90 (48+42)	45
Poypoy Actub	Imus SV Squad	99 (50+49)	32
Ximone Sandagon	Quezon Huskers	85 (44+41)	DNQ
Mike Alvarez	GenSan Warriors	75 (38+37)	DNQ
Val Fornilos	Marikina Shoemasters	DNP	
Alex Ramos	Bataan Risers	DNP	
Rhinwil Yambing	San Juan Knights	DNP	

Notes

- Players highlighted in green are contestants from the hosting team.
