= San Juan Knights =

Professional basketball team in San Juan, Philippines

- 2026 San Juan Knights season
- Leagues: MBA (1999–2001); MPBL (2018–present); FilBasket (2021–2022); PSL (2022–2025)
- Founded: 1999; 27 years ago (first incarnation); 2018; 8 years ago (second incarnation)
- History: San Juan Knights; 1999–2001 (MBA); 2018–present (MPBL); San Juan Kings; 2022–2025 (PSL)
- Arena: Playtime Filoil Centre
- Capacity: 6,000
- Location: San Juan, Metro Manila
- Team colors
- Main sponsor: Powerball Marketing & Logistics Corporation; Almeria International Construction Corporation
- Head coach: Jinggoy Estrada (de facto); Alexander Angeles (acting)
- Championships: MBA: 1 (2000); MPBL: 1 (2019)
- Conference titles: MPBL: 2 (2019, 2020–21)

The San Juan Knights (also abbreviated as SJK) are a Filipino professional basketball team based in San Juan. The team competes in the Maharlika Pilipinas Basketball League (MPBL) as a member of the league's North Division. The team plays its home games at Playtime Filoil Centre.

The team's first incarnation was established in 1999 as a member of the Metropolitan Basketball Association (MBA) and played there until 2001. In 2018, the Knights were revived as they joined the MPBL for the 2018–19 season. The team's second incarnation has taken part in other leagues, including FilBasket, Chooks-to-Go Pilipinas 3x3, and Pilipinas Super League (PSL), the latter of which they compete under the name San Juan Kings. In 2023, their volleyball counterpart, the San Juan Lady Knights became one of the eight charter teams of the Maharlika Pilipinas Volleyball Association (MPVA).

The San Juan-based franchise is one of the most successful region basketball teams in the country. Across both incarnations, the Knights have clinched two championships: one in the MBA (2000) and one in the MPBL (2019). The Knights also made the MPBL's division finals five times in a row from 2019 to 2024, and the MPBL finals in back-to-back seasons (2019 and 2021).

The Knights are one of four teams based in the Eastern Manila District of Metro Manila. The team is also backed by the sports program Go For Gold Philippines, hence the team is also known as San Juan Knights–Go For Gold (SJK–G4G).

== History ==
=== First incarnation (1999–2001) ===
The San Juan Knights were founded in 1999 by then-mayor and current senator Jinggoy Estrada and businessman Sandy Javier. The team entered the Metropolitan Basketball Association as an expansion team for the league's 1999 season alongside the Surigao Miners and Nueva Ecija Patriots.

During the pre-season, the team acquired 6'9" Bonel Balingit from the Philippine Basketball Association to a three-year, P16 million contract. Joining Balangit are Gherome Ejercito from the Pampanga Dragons, a cousin of Estrada, 1998 NCAA Most Valuable Player Christian Calaguio, and Chito Victolero.

During the playoffs of the 2000 season, San Juan first swept the Laguna Lakers, 2–0, in the Northern Conference Semifinals and went past the Manila Metrostars, 3–1, in the Northern Conference Finals, bringing the Knights to the 2000 MBA National Championship. Game 5 of the championship series against the Negros Slashers had a debris-throwing incident at the La Salle Coliseum in Bacolod, Negros Occidental, as the Knights were way ahead, 87–65, with 11:38 left in the fourth quarter when play was stopped. The Negros Slashers conceded game 5, giving the San Juan Knights a 3–2 heading into game 6. San Juan would go on to win their first of back-to-back MBA championships.

Team	Game 1	Game 2	Game 3	Game 4	Game 5	Game 6	Wins
San Juan	76	88	84	85	W	104	4
Negros	75	77	90	89	L	91	2

=== Second incarnation (2018–present) ===
==== 2018–2020: The Ayonayon and Wilson era ====
In April 2018, San Juan Knights were revived as an expansion team in the Maharlika Pilipinas Basketball League. The return of the Knights brought in names such as Mark Cardona and John Wilson. The team finished its inaugural season with a 20–5 record and clinched the third seed in the playoffs. In the playoffs, San Juan swept both Navotas and Quezon City, and won 2–1 against Manila to advance to the 2019 MPBL finals against the Davao Occidental Tigers. The series went all the way to a game 5 as San Juan won its first MPBL championship and the third overall in franchise history. Their winning traditions continued into the 2019–20 season, after facing only four losses throughout the whole season, San Juan managed to finish the season as the North Division's first seed. With a 26–4 record and a .867 win percentage, they also tied for best record that season alongside the Davao Occidental Tigers. As the playoffs began, the team swept through Pasay and Pampanga before facing the Makati Super Crunch in the North Division Finals. The series was tied before the season's suspension but San Juan were able to win deciding game 3 against a depleted Super Crunch squad to make back-to-back National Finals appearances for a chance to repeat against the Davao Occicdental Tigers. This time around, San Juan failed to defend their title as Davao Occidental won 3–1.

==== 2022–present: The Orlan Wamar era ====
After the conclusion of the 2022 MPBL season, San Juan made their debut in the Pilipinas Super League, under the name San Juan Kings. In the 2022–23 DUMPER Cup, the team went undefeated in the regular season, winning all 15 games. After beating Manila in the Quarterfinals, the Kings met the Baltazar-led Pampanga G Lanterns in the Semifinals. Unfortunately, San Juan would lose to the G Lanterns in two games.

2026 - The Ilonggo Superman "Billy Robles

San Juan fell to RIZAL XentroMall, 94–89, in overtime during the MPBL 2026 Season at One Arena in Cainta, Rizal, after squandering a late lead and failing to score in the final minutes of the extra period.

Joining this 2026 season is Mike Phillips who has officially obtained his professional athlete’s license from the Games and Amusements Board (GAB), marking his transition from collegiate to professional basketball. The UAAP Finals MVP and former De La Salle University Green Archers captain is now eligible to compete professionally and has joined the San Juan Knights.

== Rivalries ==
=== Davao Occidental Tigers ===
The rivalry between San Juan and the Davao Occidental Tigers is most prominent in the MPBL when both teams played in the National Finals in back-to-back seasons (2019 and 2021). Even though Davao Occidental has since departed the MPBL, both teams would still clash with one another whenever they compete in the same league. As of February 2024, the San Juan franchise has met the Davao Occidental Tigers a total of fifteen times across all leagues.

=== Nueva Ecija Rice Vanguards ===
San Juan's rivalry against the Nueva Ecija Rice Vanguards began in FilBasket when both teams clashed in the finals of the 2022 Summer Championship. The rivalry grew more fierce in the MPBL as both teams fought for North Division contention, with both teams meeting in the playoffs in 2022 and 2023. As of March 2024, across all leagues, both teams have met each other thirteen times.

=== Pampanga Giant Lanterns ===
In the mid-2020s, both San Juan and the Pampanga Giant Lanterns competed for championship contention when they compete in the same league. Since 2020, both teams met in the playoffs a total of four times across the MPBL and PSL, three of them occurred at either the MPBL division finals or PSL semifinals.

== Home arenas ==
San Juan plays their home games at the Filoil EcoOil Centre in the MPBL and PSL. During their time in the MBA, they have played in the PhilSports Arena from 1999 to early 2000 and the San Juan Gym in 2000.

== Current roster ==
San Juan Knights roster
Players

Pos.	No.	Name	Height	Weight	DOB	From
G	1	Patrick Sleat	6 ft 2 in (1.88 m)		2001–08–07	UPHSD
F	2	Michael Calisaan	6 ft 4 in (1.93 m)		1995–02–27	San Sebastian
G	5	Orlan Wamar Jr.	5 ft 6 in (1.68 m)		1998–08–17	Centro Escolar
G	6	AC Soberano	5 ft 11 in (1.80 m)		1994–03–28	San Beda
C	8	Raul Soyud	6 ft 6 in (1.98 m)	222 lb (101 kg)	1991–01–14	Philippines
F	9	Dexter Maiquez	6 ft 4 in (1.93 m)	220 lb (100 kg)	1991–06–09	San Sebastian
G	10	Terrence Fortea (HG)	6 ft 1 in (1.85 m)		2001–07–03	Philippines
G	11	Reyland Torres	6 ft 1 in (1.85 m)		2001–07–11	Philippines
G	13	Royce Alforque	5 ft 11 in (1.80 m)		2000–06–16	Far Eastern
G	15	James Kwekuteye (FF)	6 ft 2 in (1.88 m)	95 lb (43 kg)	1998–08–15	San Beda
F	16	Jearico Nuñez	6 ft 5 in (1.96 m)		2002–07–15	UPHSD
F/C	16	Jhaymo Eguilos (RS)	6 ft 6 in (1.98 m)	190 lb (86 kg)	1986–08–27	Far Eastern
F/C	17	Aldrech Ramos	6 ft 6 in (1.98 m)	190 lb (86 kg)	1988–04–03	Far Eastern
G/F	18	Nikko Panganiban (HG)	6 ft 0 in (1.83 m)		1999–03–31	OLFU
F/C	21	Reynel Hugnatan	6 ft 4 in (1.93 m)	210 lb (95 kg)	1978–11–03	Manila
F	23	Kenneth Villapando	6 ft 2 in (1.88 m)		1998–10–21	San Sebastian
G	81	Harold Alarcon	6 ft 1 in (1.85 m)		2002–03–18	Philippines
F	91	JP Boral	6 ft 4 in (1.93 m)		2001–03–12	UPHSD
F	—	Jomel Puno (FF)	6 ft 6 in (1.98 m)		2002–03–08	San Beda

Coaches

Head coach

- Alexander Angeles

Assistant coach(es)

- Philip Cezar
- Arbie Mangahas
- Jigs Guadamor
- James Ongpin
- Paolo Gorospe
- Jeff Tajonera
- Dino Ponce Enrile
- Nath Gregorio
- PJ Manigan
- Kristlye Padua

Team manager

- Jun Usman

Legend

- (HG) Homegrown
- (FF) Filipino-foreigner
- (EA) EASL player
- (RS) Reserve player
- (S) Suspended
- Injured

- Roster – via Genius Sports
Updated as of: June 22, 2026

=== Head coaches ===
San Juan Knights head coaches
#	Name	Start	End	Achievements	Ref.
1	Philip Cezar	1999	2001	MBA champion (2000)	
2	Allan Pangarungan	2001	2001	—	
3	Randy Alcantara	2018	2023	1x MPBL Coach of the Year (2019)	
4	Jinggoy Estrada	2023	2024	—	
5	Alexander Angeles	2024–25	current	—	

== Notable players ==
=== Individual award winners ===
MPBL finals Most Valuable Player

- Mike Ayonayon – 2019

MPBL Most Valuable Player

- John Wilson – 2020

MPBL Rookie of the Year

- Adrian Nocum – 2023

All-MPBL First Team

- Mike Ayonayon – 2020
- John Wilson – 2020
- Judel Fuentes – 2022
- Orlan Wamar Jr. – 2023

All-MPBL Second Team

- John Wilson – 2020

PSL Mythical Team

- Orlan Wamar Jr. – 2023

=== All-Stars ===
MPBL All-Star selections

- Mike Ayonayon – 2019
- Larry Rodriguez – 2019
- John Wilson – 2020
- Judel Fuentes – 2022
- Adrian Nocum – 2023
- Orlan Wamar Jr. – 2023, 2024

MPBL All-Star Game head coaches

- Randy Alcantara – 2020

MPBL pre-game event winners

- Orlan Wamar Jr. – Three-Point Shootout (2023, 2024)

PSL All-Star selections

- Ron Dennison – 2023
- Paolo Javillonar – 2023
- Adrian Nocum – 2023
- Orlan Wamar Jr. – 2023
- Fran Yu – 2023

=== PBA players ===
Ex-PBA players

- Alvin Abundo
- Bonel Balingit
- Michael Calisaan
- Mark Cardona
- Rudy Distrito
- Samboy de Leon (returned to PBA)
- Reynel Hugnatan
- Jammer Jamito
- Chris Javier
- James Kwekuteye
- Aldrech Ramos
- Larry Rodriguez
- John Wilson
- Raul Soyud

Drafted to PBA

- Gherome Ejercito – undrafted, 2000 (signed later that year)
- Rafi Reavis – 2nd overall, 2002
- Chris Calaguio – 4th overall, 2002
- Mike Ayonayon – 3rd overall, 2019
- Renzo Subido – 24th overall, 2019
- Larry Muyang – 7th overall, season 46
- Jhonard Clarito – 17th overall, season 47
- Adrian Nocum – 24th overall, season 48
- Justine Baltazar – 1st overall, season 49
- Arvin Gamboa – 17th overall, season 50

== Season-by-season records ==
League champions
Division champions
Qualified for playoffs
Best regular season record

=== Maharlika Pilipinas Basketball League ===
Season	Regular season							Playoffs	
Season	Division	Finish	GP	W	L	PCT	GB	Stage	Results
San Juan Knights
2018–19; Datu Cup	North	3rd	25	20	5	.800	3	Division quarterfinals Division semifinals Division finals National finals	won vs. Navotas, 2–0 won vs. Quezon City, 2–0 won vs. Manila, 2–1 won vs. Davao Occidental, 3–2
2019–20; Lakan Season	North	1st	30	26	4	.867	—	Division quarterfinals Division semifinals Division finals National finals	won vs. Pasay, 2–0 won vs. Pampanga, 2–0 won vs. Makati, 2–1 lost vs Davao Occidental, 1–3
2022	North	3rd	21	14	7	.667	7	Division quarterfinals Division semifinals Division finals	won vs. Valenzuela, 2–0 won vs. Pasig City, 2–0 lost vs. Nueva Ecija, 1–2
2023	North	6th	28	19	9	.679	7	Division quarterfinals Division semifinals Division finals	won vs. Makati, 2–0 won vs. Nueva Ecija, 2–0 lost vs. Pampanga, 0–2
2024	North	1st	28	26	2	.929	–	Division quarterfinals Division semifinals Division finals	won vs. Rizal, 2–0 won vs. Caloocan, 2–0 lost vs. Pampanga, 0–2
2025	North	3rd	29	26	3	.897	2	Division quarterfinals Division semifinals	won vs. Pasay, 2–0 lost vs. Pangasinan, 1–2
2026	North	2nd	25	22	3	.880	1	Division quarterfinals Division semifinals Division finals	won vs. Bataan, 2–0 won vs. Caloocan, 2–0; TBD vs. Abra
All-time regular season record			186	153	33	.823		7 playoff appearances	
All-time playoff record			51	36	15	.706		2 finals appearances	
All-time league record			237	189	48	.797		1 championship	

=== FilBasket ===
Tournament	Elimination round						Playoffs	
Tournament	Finish	GP	W	L	PCT	GB	Stage	Results
San Juan Knights
Subic 2021	3rd	10	7	3	.700	1	Quarterfinals; Semifinals; Finals	won vs. Medical Depot, 88–73 won vs. Davao Occidental, 85–84 lost vs. AICC Manila, 1–2 (series)
Summer 2022	5th	11	6	5	.545	5	Quarterfinals; Semifinals; Finals	won vs. Pasig, 93–91 won vs. Tanduay, 2–0 (series) lost vs. Nueva Ecija, 1–2 (series)
All-time elimination round record		21	13	8	.619		2 playoff appearances	
All-time playoff record		11	7	4	.636		2 finals appearances	
All-time league record		32	20	12	.625		0 championships	

=== Pilipinas Super League ===
Tournament	Elimination round						Playoffs	
Tournament	Finish	GP	W	L	PCT	GB	Stage	Results
San Juan Kings
2022–23; DUMPER Cup	1st	15	15	0	1.000	—	Quarterfinals; Semifinals	won vs. Manila, 1–0 lost vs. Pampanga G Lanterns, 0–2
2023–24; President's Cup	2nd	18	16	2	.889	1	First Round; Quarterfinals; Semifinals; Battle for third	won vs. Camarines Norte, 1–0 won vs. SGA–CSB, 1–0 lost vs. Nueva Ecija, 0–2 won vs. Biñan, 1–0
2024–25; President's Cup	3rd	10	8	2	.800	1	Quarterfinals 1 Quarterfinals 2 Semifinals; Finals	won vs. Lipa Batangas, 1–0 won vs. Malabon, 1–0 won vs. General Santos, 2–0 lost vs. Caloocan, 1–2
All-time elimination round record		43	39	4	.907		3 playoff appearances	
All-time playoff record		15	9	6	.600		1 finals appearance	
All-time league record		58	48	10	.828		0 championships	
