= Davao Occidental Tigers =

Basketball team in the Philippines

- League: MPBL (2018–2020, 2024–2025); FilBasket (2021); PSL (2021–2024)
- Founded: 2018; 8 years ago
- History: Davao Occidental Tigers; 2018–2025
- Arena: University of Southeastern Philippines Gymnasium & Cultural Center; RMC–Petro Gazz Arena; Davao City Recreation Center; RDR Gymnasium (All last used in 2019–20)
- Location: Davao Occidental
- Team colors
- Main sponsor: United Coconut Planters Life Assurance Corporation
- Championships: MPBL: 1 (2021); PSL: 1 (2022)
- Conference titles: MPBL: 2 (2019, 2020–21)

The Davao Occidental Tigers (also known as Davao Occidental Tigers – Cocolife due to sponsorship reasons) were a Filipino professional basketball team based in the Davao metropolitan area and representing the province of Davao Occidental. The team last competed in the Maharlika Pilipinas Basketball League. The team did not play any home games in Davao Occidental, but played at a variety of venues across Metro Davao.

The franchise was founded as an expansion team in the Maharlika Pilipinas Basketball League (MPBL) for its 2018–19 season. Following their title in the 2021 MPBL finals, they moved to the Pilipinas Super League (PSL) and became one of its founding members, before returning to the MPBL in 2024.

The Tigers are one of four teams based in Mindanao and the only one from the Davao Region. They are also one of the more successful teams in Philippine regional basketball, with four finals appearances across both the MPBL and PSL. Of those four appearances, the Tigers won the 2021 MPBL finals and the 2022 Pilipinas Super League finals.

The Tigers are one of five teams based in Mindanao and the lone team based in Davao Region.

== History ==
=== 2018–2021: First MPBL stint ===
Davao Occidental Tigers were established in 2018 as an expansion team in the Maharlika Pilipinas Basketball League. The Tigers were one of three teams to be based in Mindanao at the time, alongside General Santos and Zamboanga. The team led by Mark Yee saw immediate success, clinching the South Division's top seed with a 20–5 record.

In the playoffs, Tigers swept Cebu City in the First Round, as well as Bacoor City in the division semifinals. In the South Division finals, they met the defending champion Batangas City Athletics. Although Batangas City forced a game 3 in overtime, the series was won by Davao Occidental and they faced San Juan Knights in the 2019 MPBL finals. The series went back-and-forth with both teams alternating wins, all coming down to a winner-take-all game in Davao City. Tigers led by three points heading into the last minute, however, Jhonard Clarito scored four consecutive points for San Juan as Davao Occidental lost the game and the series by a single point.

Looking to come back after a stunning finals loss, Davao Occidental kept the same core heading into the 2019–20 season. Once again the team clinched the top seed in the South Division with a record of 26–4. This made Davao Occidental Tigers the first, and currently only, MPBL team to clinch the best division record in back-to-back seasons.

To begin their 2020 playoff campaign, Tigers first beat Bicol in three games. They then met Zamboanga in the division semifinals, with the first game ending up as the lowest-scoring in the MPBL history. Davao Occidental then matched up with Basilan in the South Division finals. With the series tied 1–1, it saw an abrupt ending following the suspension of the playoffs due to the COVID-19 pandemic in the Philippines. When the playoffs continued the following year, multiple Basilan members were tested positive for the virus, thus the series was awarded to Davao Occidental, creating a finals rematch against San Juan. Davao Occidental got their revenge and won the series in four games, thus winning their first league championship in franchise history.

=== 2021–2024: FilBasket and Pilipinas Super League ===
Following their MPBL championship run, Davao Occidental Tigers took part in the inaugural tournament of FilBasket, the 2021 Subic Championship. The team clinched second place in the elimination round with a 7–3 record. After winning against Burlington EOG in the quarterfinals, Tigers experienced déjà vu when they lost to San Juan in the semifinals by a single point.

In 2021, the team became a founding member of the Pilipinas Super League, formally moving from the MPBL. Before their PSL debut, the Tigers secured to participation in the ASEAN Basketball League. Unfortunately, the 2022 season was cancelled due to the continuing effects of the COVID-19 pandemic in Southeast Asia. Much like their MPBL debut, the lead the PSL with the best record in the 2022 Pearl of the Orient Cup, finishing 13–1. The team then swept both Basilan and Cagayan de Oro on their way to the first PSL championship. In the following 2022–23 DUMPER Cup, Davao Occidental remained among the best teams with the second-best record of the elimination round. The team did suffer losses against Boracay and the Pampanga Royce, before ultimately meeting the Pampanga G Lanterns led by Justine Baltazar. Davao Occidental ended up getting swept as the Lanterns won their first league championship.

=== 2024: Second MPBL stint ===
On March 29, 2024, Davao Occidental announced that they would return to the MPBL for the 2024 season.

=== 2025: New Era ===
On May 20, 2025, after a 3-4 start to the Davao Occidental 2025 season announced that they would be transitioning into a new era. Under new management, announcing a new interim Head Coach Clive Castillo - an assistant at London Lions - to lead the team in the short term.

== Rivalries ==
=== San Juan Knights ===
Davao Occidental's rivalry against the San Juan Knights began in the MPBL when both teams met in back-to-back national finals series (2019 and 2021). Despite Davao Occidental competing in other leagues since then, both teams would still encounter each other whenever they compete in the same league. As of February 2024, the Davao Occidental Tigers have met the San Juan Knights a total of fifteen times across all leagues.

== Current roster ==
Davao Occidental Tigers roster
Players

Pos.	No.	Name	Height	Weight	DOB	From
F	7	Kenneth Ighalo	6 ft 2 in (1.88 m)	175 lb (79 kg)	1989–01–11	Mapúa
G	8	Peter June Simon	6 ft 0 in (1.83 m)	180 lb (82 kg)	1980–06–01	Mindanao
F	10	Terrence Tumalip	6 ft 1 in (1.85 m)	190 lb (86 kg)	1990–05–13	TIP
F	11	Dariel Bayla	6 ft 4 in (1.93 m)			Arellano
F	13	Bonbon Custodio	5 ft 11 in (1.80 m)	165 lb (75 kg)	1982–11–30	UE
G	27	James Martinez	5 ft 9 in (1.75 m)	170 lb (77 kg)	1987–01–31	UE
F	28	Dave Arana (HG)
G	31	Biboy Enguio	6 ft 0 in (1.83 m)	177 lb (80 kg)	1988–01–31	UE
C	32	Yutien Andrada	6 ft 5 in (1.96 m)		1990–11–18	De La Salle
F/C	33	Kelly Nabong	6 ft 6 in (1.98 m)	227 lb (103 kg)	1988–11–17	SRJC
G	40	John Karlo Casiño	5 ft 10 in (1.78 m)			Centro Escolar

Coaches

Head coach

- Manu Iñigo

Legend

- (HG) Homegrown
- (FF) Filipino-foreigner
- (EA) EASL player
- (RS) Reserve player
- (S) Suspended
- Injured

- Roster – via Genius Sports
Updated as of: March 4, 2025

=== Head coaches ===
Davao Occidental Tigers head coaches
#	Name	Start	End	Achievements	Ref.
1	Don Dulay	2018	2021	—	
2	Matt Makalintal	2021	2021	—	
3	Arvin Bonleon	2022	2023	—	
4	Jesse James Bartolome	2022–23	2023–24	—	
5	Manu Iñigo	2023–24	2025	—	
6	Clive Castillo	2025	2025	—	
7	Arvin Bonleon	2025	2025	—	

== Notable players ==
=== Individual award winners ===
MPBL finals Most Valuable Player

- Mark Yee – 2020–21

All-MPBL First Team

- Mark Yee – 2019, 2020

All-MPBL Second Team

- Leo Najorda – 2020

PSL Finals Most Valuable Player

- Emman Calo – 2022

PSL Most Valuable Player

- Gab Dagangon – 2022
- John Wilson – 2023

PSL Mythical Team

- Robby Celiz – 2022
- Gab Dagangon – 2022
- John Wilson – 2023

=== All-Stars ===
MPBL All-Star selections

- Leo Najorda – 2019
- Mark Yee – 2019, 2020
- Arthur dela Cruz – 2024
- Mac Tallo – 2024

MPBL All-Star head coaches

- Don Dulay – 2019, 2020

PSL All-Star selections

- Kyt Jimenez – 2023
- Michole Solera – 2023

=== PBA players ===
Ex-PBA players

- Alvin Abundo
- Robby Celiz
- Jervy Cruz
- Bonbon Custodio
- Arthur dela Cruz
- Biboy Enguio
- James Forrester
- Paulo Hubalde
- Brian Ilad
- James Martinez
- Leo Najorda
- Billy Robles
- Larry Rodriguez
- Renzo Subido
- Mac Tallo
- John Wilson
- Mark Yee

Drafted to PBA

- Kyt Jimenez – 76th overall, season 48

== Season-by-season records ==
League champions
Division champions
Qualified for playoffs
Best regular season record

=== Maharlika Pilipinas Basketball League ===
Season	Regular season							Playoffs	
Season	Division	Finish	GP	W	L	PCT	GB	Stage	Results
Davao Occidental Tigers
2018–19; Datu Cup	South	1st	25	20	5	.800	–	Division quarterfinals Division semifinals Division finals National finals	won vs. Cebu City, 2–0 won vs. Bacoor City, 2–0 won vs. Batangas City, 2–1 lost vs. San Juan, 2–3
2019–20; Lakan Season	South	1st	30	26	4	.867	–	Division quarterfinals Division semifinals Division finals National finals	won vs. Bicol, 2–1 won vs. Zamboanga, 2–0 won vs. Basilan, 2–1 won vs. San Juan, 3–1
Did not participate from 2022 to 2023
2024	South	7th	28	15	13	.536	6	Division quarterfinals	lost vs. Batangas City, 0–2
2025	South	9th	29	12	17	.414	13	Clinched play-in; did not qualify playoffs	
Did not participate from 2026
All-time regular season record			112	73	39	.652		3 playoff appearances	
All-time playoff record			26	17	9	.654		2 finals appearances	
All-time overall record			138	90	48	.652		1 championship	

=== Pilipinas Super League ===
Season	Elimination round						Playoffs	
Season	Finish	GP	W	L	PCT	GB	Stage	Results
Davao Occidental Tigers
2022; Pearl of the Orient Cup	1st	14	13	1	.929	–	Semifinals; Finals	won vs. Basilan, 2–0 won vs. Cagayan de Oro, 2–0
2022–23; DUMPER Cup	2nd	15	12	3	.800	3	Quarterfinals; Semifinals; Finals	won vs. Boracay, 1–1 won vs. Pampanga Royce, 2–1 lost vs. Pampanga G Lanterns, 0–2
2023–24; President's Cup	6th	18	13	5	.722	4	First round Quarterfinals	won vs. Misamis Oriental, 1–0 lost vs. Nueva Ecija, 1–1
All-time elimination round record		47	38	9	.809		3 playoff appearances	
All-time playoff record		14	9	5	.643		2 finals appearances	
All-time overall record		61	47	14	.770		1 championship	
