= 2022–23 Pilipinas Super League season =

2nd tournament of the Pilipinas Super League

- League: Pilipinas Super League
- Sport: Basketball
- Duration: Regular season: November 23, 2022 – March 11, 2023; Playoffs: March 13 – 24, 2023; Finals: March 27 – 30, 2023
- Games: 120 (regular season); 12 (playoffs)
- Teams: 16

Regular season
- Top seed: San Juan Kings
- Season MVP: John Wilson

Finals
- Champions: Pampanga G Lanterns
- Runners-up: Davao Occidental Tigers
- Finals MVP: Justine Baltazar

PSL seasons
- ← 2022 2023–24 →

The 2022–23 Pilipinas Super League season, also known as the DUMPER Cup, was the second season of the Pilipinas Super League (PSL) Pro Division. The regular season began on November 23, 2022, and ended on March 11, 2023. The playoffs then began on March 13, 2023, and ended on March 30, 2023. The entire tournament is sponsored by the DUMPER Partylist, hence the name.

The 2023 PSL All-Star Game took place on March 18, 2023 at the Bren Z. Guiao Convention Center in San Fernando, Pampanga.

The San Juan Kings finished the regular season with the first undefeated record in PSL history. Despite that, it was the Pampanga G Lanterns who were the champions of the tournament, earning their first league championship in franchise history. The G Lanterns defeated the defending champion Davao Occidental Tigers in two games in the Finals. Justine Baltazar was named as the Finals MVP.

== Teams ==
| Team | Locality | Previous tournament | Best result |
|---|---|---|---|
| ARS Warriors – San Pedro, Laguna | San Pedro, Laguna | New team | |
| Bagong Cabuyao Homelab Nation | Cabuyao, Laguna | New team | |
| Batang Kankaloo Koolers | Caloocan | New team | |
| Bicol Spicy Oragons | Bicol Region | 2022 Pearl of the Orient Cup | 7th place (2022) |
| Boracay Islanders | Boracay | New team | |
| Cagayan de Oro PSP | Cagayan de Oro, Misamis Oriental | New team | |
| Davao Occidental Tigers | Davao Occidental | 2022 Pearl of the Orient Cup | Champion (2022) |
| Koponang Lakan ng Bulacan | Bulacan | New team | |
| Manila CityStars | Manila | New team | |
| 1Munti Emeralds | Muntinlupa | New team | |
| Nueva Ecija Slashers | Nueva Ecija | New team | |
| Pampanga G Lanterns | Pampanga | New team | |
| Pampanga Royce | Pampanga | New team | |
| Quezon City Beacons | Quezon City | New team | |
| San Juan Kings | San Juan | New team | |
| Santa Rosa Laguna Lions | Santa Rosa, Laguna | New team | |

== Venues ==
| Locations of venues within Metro Manila (Special venues are marked by a yellow pog) | Locations of venues outside Metro Manila (Special venues are marked by a yellow pog) |

Regular venues
| Venue | Location | Capacity |
|---|---|---|
| AYSN Sports Center | Quezon City | N/A |
| Bren Z. Guiao Convention Center | San Fernando, Pampanga | 3,000 |
| Caloocan Sports Complex | Caloocan | 2,500 |
| Central Recreation and Fitness Center | Quezon City | N/A |
| Filoil EcoOil Centre | San Juan | 6,000 |
| Rizal Technological University | Mandaluyong | N/A |
| San Andres Sports Complex | Manila | 3,000 |
| Trinity University of Asia | Quezon City | 980 |

Special venues
| Venue | Location | Capacity |
Opening ceremonies
| Smart Araneta Coliseum | Quezon City | 20,000 |
Out-of-town venues
| Albay Astrodome | Legazpi, Albay | 5,000 |
| Bulacan Capitol Gymnasium | Malolos, Bulacan | 5,000 |
| Nagaño Gymnasium | San Leonardo, Nueva Ecija | N/A |
| RMC Petro Gazz Arena | Davao City, Davao del Sur | 2,000 |
| Santa Rosa Sports Complex | Santa Rosa, Laguna | 5,700 |

== Regular season ==
The regular season began on November 23, 2022.

=== Format ===
All participating teams played in a single round-robin format, unlike the double round-robin in the previous season. The top eight teams advance to a three-round, single-elimination playoff bracket. In the quarterfinals, the higher-seeded team is given twice-to-beat advantage. The semifinals and finals use standard best-of-three series.

=== Standings ===
| Pos | Team | Pld | W | L | PCT | GB | Qualification |
|---|---|---|---|---|---|---|---|
| 1 | z – San Juan Kings | 15 | 15 | 0 | 1.000 | — | Twice-to-beat in Quarterfinals |
| 2 | y – Davao Occidental Tigers | 15 | 12 | 3 | .800 | 3 | Twice-to-beat in Quarterfinals |
| 3 | y – Pampanga Royce | 15 | 11 | 4 | .733 | 4 | Twice-to-beat in Quarterfinals |
| 4 | y – Pampanga G Lanterns | 15 | 10 | 5 | .667 (Note: Pampanga G Lanterns (+6), Santa Rosa (0), and Caloocan (-6) are ranked by head-to-head point differential.) | 5 | Twice-to-beat in Quarterfinals |
| 5 | x – Santa Rosa Laguna Lions | 15 | 10 | 5 | .667 | 5 | Twice-to-win in Quarterfinals |
| 6 | x – Batang Kankaloo Koolers | 15 | 10 | 5 | .667 | 5 | Twice-to-win in Quarterfinals |
| 7 | x – Boracay Islanders | 15 | 9 | 6 | .600 (Note: Boracay (2–0), Manila (1–1), and Bulacan (0–2) are ranked by head-to-head standings.) | 6 | Twice-to-win in Quarterfinals |
| 8 | x – Manila CityStars | 15 | 9 | 6 | .600 | 6 | Twice-to-win in Quarterfinals |
| 9 | Koponang Lakan ng Bulacan | 15 | 9 | 6 | .600 | 6 | |
| 10 | Bicol Spicy Oragons | 15 | 5 | 10 | .333 (Note: Bicol wins tiebreaker over Quezon City based on head-to-head victory.) | 10 | |
| 11 | Quezon City Beacons | 15 | 5 | 10 | .333 | 10 | |
| 12 | 1Munti Emeralds | 15 | 4 | 11 | .267 (Note: Muntinlupa wins tiebreaker over Nueva Ecija based on head-to-head victory.) | 11 | |
| 13 | Nueva Ecija Slashers | 15 | 4 | 11 | .267 | 11 | |
| 14 | Cagayan de Oro PSP | 15 | 3 | 12 | .200 | 12 | |
| 15 | ARS Warriors – San Pedro, Laguna | 15 | 2 | 13 | .133 (Note: San Pedro wins tiebreaker over Cabuyao based on head-to-head victory.) | 13 | |
| 16 | Bagong Cabuyao Homelab Nation | 15 | 2 | 13 | .133 | 13 | |

Source: Standings
x – Clinched twice-to-win in Quarterfinals; y – Clinched twice-to-beat in Quarterfinals; z – Clinched best record overall

=== Results ===
Each team plays each other once. Number of asterisks after each score denotes number of overtimes played.

| Teams | BCL | BOR | BUL | CAB | CDO | CAL | DVO | MNL | MUN | NE | PGL | PMR | QC | SJ | SP | SR |
|---|---|---|---|---|---|---|---|---|---|---|---|---|---|---|---|---|
| Bicol | | 74–83 | 80–94 | 109–110 | 88–83 | 74–78 | 67–73 | 90–95 | 133–132* | 73–72 | 74–97 | 80–98 | 64–63 | 100–103 | 121–74 | 66–69 |
| Boracay | | | 78–74 | 95–79 | 89–82 | 96–111 | 85–88 | 87–80 | 79–62 | 81–70 | 84–81 | 70–79 | 49–61 | 70–83 | 91–73 | 65–68 |
| Bulacan | | | | 100–57 | 97–86 | 72–61 | 70–84 | 74–81 | 72–61 | 62–79 | 85–68 | 52–69 | 63–62 | 60–69 | 102–69 | 67–65 |
| Cabuyao | | | | | 73–88 | 80–107 | 75–94 | 86–95 | 79–88 | 72–71 | 83–103 | 52–74 | 68–100 | 80–95 | 56–59 | 72–90 |
| Cagayan de Oro | | | | | | 86–96 | 89–85 | 79–89 | 76–71 | 72–79 | 76–87 | 62–79 | 96–97 | 83–90 | 87–92 | 62–100 |
| Caloocan | | | | | | | 61–67 | 87–95 | 125–102 | 91–79 | 81–79 | 77–71 | 70–62 | 63–77 | 90–76 | 64–72 |
| Davao Occidental | | | | | | | | 105–91 | 87–66 | 78–76 | 84–87 | 90–87* | 81–79 | 71–76 | 108–64 | 82–68 |
| Manila | | | | | | | | | 111–109 | 91–85 | 69–78 | 80–88 | 81–77 | 89–93 | 112–105 | 66–82 |
| Muntinlupa | | | | | | | | | | 98–95 | 93–129 | 67–82 | 81–73 | 71–80 | 98–62 | 72–84 |
| Nueva Ecija | | | | | | | | | | | 72–71 | 61–82 | 65–111 | 70–73 | 118–85 | 86–102 |
| Pampanga G Lanterns | | | | | | | | | | | | 83–81 | 83–59 | 81–94 | 89–69 | 78–70 |
| Pampanga Royce | | | | | | | | | | | | | 72–65 | 77–86 | 99–57 | 85–61 |
| Quezon City | | | | | | | | | | | | | | 66–74 | 114–84 | 64–73 |
| San Juan | | | | | | | | | | | | | | | 94–61 | 71–70 |
| San Pedro | | | | | | | | | | | | | | | | 74–133 |
| Santa Rosa | | | | | | | | | | | | | | | | |

Source: Schedule
Legend: Blue = left column team win; Red = top row team win.
Matches with lighter background shading were decided after overtime.

== Playoffs ==
The playoffs began on March 13, 2023.

=== Bracket ===
Quarterfinals (Twice-to-beat)
1 | San Juan | 95 | –
8 | Manila | 84 | –
4 | Pampanga G Lanterns | 72 | –
5 | Santa Rosa | 71 | –
2 | Davao Occidental | 80 | 73
7 | Boracay | 91 | 71
3 | Pampanga Royce | 91 | –
6 | Caloocan | 77 | –

Semifinals (Best-of-3)
1 | San Juan | 83 | 61 | –
4 | Pampanga G Lanterns | 93 | 75 | –
2 | Davao Occidental | 74 | 82 | 88
3 | Pampanga Royce | 98 | 77 | 80

Finals (Best-of-3)
4 | Pampanga G Lanterns | 87 | 79 | –
2 | Davao Occidental | 84 | 72 | –

== All-Star Game ==
The PSL held its first ever All-Star Game on March 18, 2023 at the Bren Z. Guiao Convention Center in San Fernando, Pampanga. There were two teams, the Luzon All-Stars and the VisMin All-Stars. The team each all-star is placed is based on where the player is based in and not the team itself. Twelve players were placed in each team alongside one guest player.

The game ended in a tie, with both teams scoring 123 points each. Gabby Espinas of the Luzon All-Stars and Orlan Wamar Jr. of the VisMin All-Stars were declared co-MVPs.

=== Lineups ===
Luzon All-Stars
| Pos | Player | Team |
|---|---|---|
| | Jason Ballesteros^{[D]} | Koponang Lakan ng Bulacan |
| | Justine Baltazar | Pampanga G Lanterns |
| | Raymond Binuya | Pampanga G Lanterns |
| | Mark Cardona | Boracay Islanders |
| | Gabby Espinas | Batang Kankaloo Koolers |
| | Johnsherick Estrada | Boracay Islanders |
| | Jerwin Gaco | N/A (guest player) |
| | Paolo Javillonar | San Juan Kings |
| | Kyt Jimenez^{[D]} | Davao Occidental Tigers |
| | Jolo Mendoza^{[D]} | Pampanga Royce |
| | Adrian Nocum | San Juan Kings |
| | Louie Sangalang | Pampanga G Lanterns |
| | Fran Yu | San Juan Kings |
Head coach: Randy Alcantara (San Juan Kings)

VisMin All-Stars
| Pos | Player | Team |
|---|---|---|
| | Poypoy Actub^{[D]} | Koponang Lakan ng Bulacan |
| | Monbert Arong | Quezon City Beacons |
| | JB Bahio | Pampanga Royce |
| | Junjun Bonsubre | Santa Rosa Laguna Lions |
| | Ron Dennison | San Juan Kings |
| | Joshua Flores | Pampanga Royce |
| | Jaymar Gimpayan | Boracay Islanders |
| | Zachary Huang | Pampanga Royce |
| | Marc Pingris | N/A (guest player) |
| | Kurt Reyson | Pampanga G Lanterns |
| | Michole Solera | Davao Occidental Tigers |
| | John Marco Tayongtong | Batang Kankaloo Koolers |
| | Orlan Wamar Jr. | San Juan Kings |
Head coach: Britt Reroma (Santa Rosa Laguna Lions)

Notes

- ^{D} Did not play in the All-Star Game.

=== Game ===
March 18, 2023
06:00 pm

Boxscore

| Luzon All-Stars | 123–123 | VisMin All-Stars |
Scoring by quarter: 27–33, 31–20, 33–35, 32–25
| Pts: Gabby Espinas 29; Rebs: Gabby Espinas 17; Asts: Raymong Binuya 6 | | Pts: Kurt Reyson 18; Rebs: Marc Pingris 13; Asts: Orlan Wamar Jr. 7 |

Bren Z. Guiao Convention Center, San Fernando, Pampanga

== Awards ==
The league feted its Mythical Team aptly called the "Super Five" at halftime of Game 1 of the Finals series on March 28, 2023 at the Bren Z. Guiao Convention Center in San Fernando, Pampanga. The Most Valuable Player and Finals Most Valuable Player were handed out later at halftime and at the conclusion respectively of Game 2 of the Finals.

| Awards | Recipient | Team |
|---|---|---|
| Most Valuable Player | John Wilson | Davao Occidental Tigers |
| Finals Most Valuable Player | Justine Baltazar | Pampanga G Lanterns |
| Inspirational Player Award | Mac Cardona | Boracay Islanders |
| PSL Mythical Team | Gabby Espinas | Batang Kankaloo Koolers |
| PSL Mythical Team | Orlan Wamar | San Juan Kings |
| PSL Mythical Team | John Wilson | Davao Occidental Tigers |
| PSL Mythical Team | Jaymar Gimpayan | Boracay Islanders |
| PSL Mythical Team | Mac Cardona | Boracay Islanders |

== Junior Division ==
The following Junior Division tournaments took place in between the 2022–23 DUMPER Cup and the 2023–24 President's Cup.

18-Under Championship
| Leg | Champion | Series | Runner-up |
|---|---|---|---|
| NCR | Letran Farm Fresh Milkers | 2–1 | EZ Jersey Doc Boleros |
| Luzon | Pampanga Delta | 2–0 | Quezon Province |
| Visayas | Sherilin Unisol City of Naga | 2–0 | Consolacion Sarok Weavers |
| Mindanao North | Cagayan de Oro Higalas (B) | 2–0 | Meljohn's Tailoring |
| Mindanao South | Max Ballers | 2–0 | ISD Pacman |
| Overall | No championship^{[C]} | | |

21-Under Championship
| Leg | Champion | Score | Runner-up |
|---|---|---|---|
| Luzon^{[L]} | NEU Hunters | 63–61 | San Juan Kings |

Notes

- ^{C} Due to management changes, the 18U overall championship was cancelled. The two finalists, Pampanga Delta and Letran Farm Fresh Milkers were declared co-champions.
- ^{L} The Luzon leg is the only leg of the tournament, hence it is also considered the overall championship.
