= 2021 FilBasket Subic Championship =

Inaugural tournament of FilBasket; only tournament in 2021

Tournament details
- Country: Philippines
- Dates: October 28 – November 22, 2021
- Teams: 11

Final positions
- Champions: AICC Manila
- Runner-up: San Juan Knights

The FilBasket Subic Championship, also known as the FilBasket Subic Championship – Cocolife due to sponsorship reasons, was the inaugural tournament under FilBasket, now known as AsiaBasket. It was also the only tournament held in 2021. The tournament began on October 28, 2021, with the playoffs running from November 16 to 21, 2021. The entire tournament took place at the Subic Bay Gymnasium, located in the Subic Bay Freeport Zone.

The tournament was won by AICC Manila after defeating the San Juan Knights, two games to one, with Hesed Gabo winning Finals MVP honors.

Subic 2021 is also the only FilBasket / AsiaBasket tournament that is not under professional status, but that in itself has been disputed before and in the months after the tournament began by the Games and Amusements Board (GAB).

== Teams ==
Eleven teams participated in the inaugural FilBasket tournament:

| Name | Locality |
|---|---|
| 7A Primus | — |
| AICC Manila | — |
| Batangas City Athletics | Batangas City, Batangas |
| Burlington EOG Sports | — |
| Davao Occidental Tigers | Davao Occidental |
| FSD Makati Army | Makati |
| Medical Depot | — |
| Muntinlupa Defenders | Muntinlupa |
| Nueva Ecija Bespren | Nueva Ecija |
| Pasig Sta. Lucia Realtors | Pasig |
| San Juan Knights | San Juan |

== Format ==
All participating teams played in a single round-robin format, where each team plays one game against all other teams, for a total of ten games.

The top eight teams then advanced to a three-round, single-elimination playoff bracket. The Quarterfinals gives higher-seeded teams a twice-to-beat advantage, needing them only one win to advance. The Semifinals is a single game while the Finals is a best-of-three series.

== Elimination round ==
=== Standings ===
| Pos | Team | Pld | W | L | PCT | GB | Qualification |
|---|---|---|---|---|---|---|---|
| 1 | AICC Manila | 10 | 8 | 2 | .800 | — | Twice-to-beat in Quarterfinals |
| 2 | Davao Occidental Tigers | 10 | 7 | 3 | .700 (Note: Davao Occidental wins tiebreaker over San Juan by head-to-head victory.) | 1 | Twice-to-beat in Quarterfinals |
| 3 | San Juan Knights | 10 | 7 | 3 | .700 | 1 | Twice-to-beat in Quarterfinals |
| 4 | Nueva Ecija Bespren | 10 | 6 | 4 | .600 (Note: Nueva Ecija (2–1) and Pasig (2–1) win tiebreaker over Burlington (1–2) and Batangas City (1–2) based on head-to-head standings; Nueva Ecija wins tiebreaker over Pasig by head-to-head victory; Burlington wins tiebreaker over Batangas City by head-to-head victory.) | 2 | Twice-to-beat in Quarterfinals |
| 5 | Pasig Sta. Lucia Realtors | 10 | 6 | 4 | .600 | 2 | Twice-to-win in Quarterfinals |
| 6 | Medical Depot | 10 | 6 | 4 | .600 | 2 | Twice-to-win in Quarterfinals |
| 7 | Burlington EOG Sports | 10 | 6 | 4 | .600 | 2 | Twice-to-win in Quarterfinals |
| 8 | Batangas City Athletics | 10 | 5 | 5 | .500 | 3 | Twice-to-win in Quarterfinals |
| 9 | 7A Primus | 10 | 2 | 8 | .200 (Note: 7A Primus wins tiebreaker over FSD Makati by head-to-head victory.) | 6 | |
| 10 | FSD Makati Army | 10 | 2 | 8 | .200 | 6 | |
| 11 | Muntinlupa Defenders | 10 | 0 | 10 | .000 | 8 | |

Source: Standings – via Genius Sports

=== Results ===
| Teams | 7AP | AICC | BTG | BUR | DVO | FSD | MED | MUN | NEB | PSG | SJK |
|---|---|---|---|---|---|---|---|---|---|---|---|
| 7A Primus | | 108–117 | 75–82 | 79–102 | 83–86 | 84–79 | 72–86 | 84–74 | 92–95 | 53–80 | 59–81 |
| AICC Manila | | | 81–78 | 95–91 | 87–90 | 86–83 | 72–63 | 99–64 | 94–82 | 74–78 | 75–69 |
| Batangas City Athletics | | | | 83–86 | 101–96 | 102–88 | 93–99 | 90–77 | 87–93 | 87–72 | 77–83 |
| Burlington EOG Sports | | | | | 76–69 | 105–85 | 80–94 | 103–67 | 97–74 | 58–72 | 69–77 |
| Davao Occidental Tigers | | | | | | 82–69 | 70–58 | 108–50 | 73–74 | 68–66 | 120–115 |
| FSD Makati Army | | | | | | | 68–81 | 103–89 | 88–86 | 64–84 | 81–83 |
| Medical Depot | | | | | | | | 85–70 | 76–79 | 65–78 | 69–67 |
| Muntinlupa Defenders | | | | | | | | | 91–96 | 70–101 | 66–92 |
| Nueva Ecija Bespren | | | | | | | | | | 70–68 | 65–104 |
| Pasig Sta. Lucia Realtors | | | | | | | | | | | 70–72 |
| San Juan Knights | | | | | | | | | | | |

Source: Schedule – via Genius Sports
Legend: Blue = left column team win; Red = top row team win.
Matches with lighter background shading were decided after overtime.

== Playoffs ==
=== Bracket ===
Quarterfinals (Twice-to-beat)
1 | AICC Manila | 75 | –
8 | Batangas City Athletics | 65 | –
4 | Nueva Ecija | 79 | 66
5 | Pasig Sta. Lucia Realtors | 99 | 79
2 | Davao Occidental Tigers | 88 | –
7 | Burlington EOG Sports | 81 | –
3 | San Juan Knights | 88 | –
6 | Medical Depot | 81 | –

Semifinals (Single game)
1 | AICC Manila | 88
5 | Pasig Sta. Lucia Realtors | 68
2 | Davao Occidental Tigers | 84
3 | San Juan Knights | 85

Finals (Best-of-3)
1 | AICC Manila | 74 | 74 | 72
3 | San Juan Knights | 80 | 70 | 68

=== Quarterfinals ===
==== (1) AICC Manila vs. (8) Batangas City Athletics ====
November 16
4:30PM

Box Score

AICC Manila 75, Batangas City Athletics 65
Scoring by quarter: 23–21, 16–9, 14–14, 22–21
| Pts: Gabo 16; Rebs: Mabulac 11; Asts: Bitoon 5 | Pts: Viernes 20; Rebs: Arellano 9 Asts: Raymund 4 |
AICC wins series in one game

Subic Bay Gymnasium

==== (2) Davao Occidental Tigers vs. (7) Burlington EOG Sports ====
November 17
4:30PM

Box Score

Davao Occidental Tigers 88, Burlington EOG Sports 81
Scoring by quarter: 24–21, 17–19, 27–25, 23–16
| Pts: Wilson 23; Rebs: Robles 14; Asts: Palencia 5 | Pts: Castro 16; Rebs: Nermal 10; Asts: Castro 4 |
Davao Occidental wins series in one game

Subic Bay Gymnasium

==== (3) San Juan Knights vs. (6) Medical Depot ====
November 17
7:10PM

Box Score

San Juan Knights 88, Medical Depot 73
Scoring by quarter: 20–13, 18–11, 25–32, 25–17
| Pts: Abundo 28; Rebs: Gamboa 7 Asts: Abundo 10 | Pts: Cabahug 22; Rebs: two people 10; Asts: Melencio 4 |
San Juan wins series in one game

Subic Bay Gymnasium

==== (4) Nueva Ecija Bespren vs. (5) Sta. Lucia Realtors ====
November 16
7:10PM

Box Score

Nueva Ecija Bespren 79, Pasig Sta. Lucia Realtors 99
Scoring by quarter: 20–25, 25–26, 19 –26, 15–22
| Pts: Sarao 20; Rebs: Nacpil 10; Asts: Palma 9 | Pts: Arana 25; Rebs: Arana 11; Asts: Costelo 9 |

Subic Bay Gymnasium

November 18
5:30PM

Box Score

Pasig Sta. Lucia Realtors 79, Nueva Ecija Bespren 66
Scoring by quarter: 22–13, 18–13, 19–19, 20–21
| Pts: Costelo 18; Rebs: Ablaza 12; Asts: Bautista 4 | Pts: Sarao 14; Rebs: Sarao 10; Asts: Martin 5 |
Pasig wins series in two games

Subic Bay Gymnasium

=== Semifinals ===
==== (1) AICC Manila vs. (5) Pasig Sta. Lucia Realtors ====
November 19
4:30PM

Box Score

AICC Manila 88, Pasig Sta. Lucia Realtors 68
Scoring by quarter: 24–15, 25–17, 22–24, 17–12
| Pts: Mabulac 15; Rebs: Taganas 8 Asts: Gabo 7 | Pts: Apinan 14; Rebs: Apinan 11; Asts: Ablaza 4 |
AICC advances to the finals

Subic Bay Gymnasium

==== (2) Davao Occidental Tigers vs. (3) San Juan Knights ====
November 19
7:10PM

Box Score

Davao Occidental Tigers 84, San Juan Knights 85
Scoring by quarter: 15–16, 16–24, 27–22, 26–23
| Pts: Celiz 20; Rebs: Robles 14; Asts: Robles 8 | Pts: Wamar 26; Rebs: Ular 7 Asts: Abundo 7 |
San Juan advances to the finals

Subic Bay Gymnasium

=== Finals: (1) AICC Manila vs. (3) San Juan Knights ===
==== Game 1 ====
November 20
6:00PM

Box Score

AICC Manila 74, San Juan Knights 80
Scoring by quarter: 14–15, 15–25, 30–18, 15–22
| Pts: Gabo 22; Rebs: Mabulac 7 Asts: Gabo 4 | Pts: Abando 17; Rebs: Clarito 11; Asts: Abundo 6 |
San Juan leads series, 1–0

Subic Bay Gymnasium

==== Game 2 ====
November 21
6:00PM

Box Score

San Juan Knights 70, AICC Manila 74
Scoring by quarter: 16–11, 10–28, 19–15, 25–20
| Pts: Abando 16; Rebs: two people 8 Asts: Abundo 7 | Pts: Bitoon 13; Rebs: Mabulac 10; Asts: Manalang 3 |
Series tied, 1–1

Subic Bay Gymnasium

==== Game 3 ====
November 22
6:00PM

Box Score

AICC Manila 72, San Juan Knights 68
Scoring by quarter: 20–17, 16–14, 18–12, 21–25
| Pts: Mabulac 18; Rebs: Juico 8 Asts: Gabo 6 | Pts: Abando 17; Rebs: Calma 13; Asts: Abundo 4 |
AICC wins the series, 2–1

Subic Bay Gymnasium

Hesed Gabo was declared as the Finals MVP of the tournament.

== Statistical leaders ==
| Category | Player | Team | Statistic |
|---|---|---|---|
| Points | Orlan Wamar | San Juan Knights | 199 |
| Field Goals | Emil Renz Palma | Nueva Ecija Bespren | 72 |
| 3-Point Field Goals | Patrick Jan Cabahug | Medical Depot | 36 |
| Rebounds | Michael Mabulac | AICC Manila | 133 |
| Assists | Alvin Abundo | San Juan Knights | 84 |
| Blocks | Simon David Camacho | Medical Depot | 39 |
| Steals | Emil Renz Palma | Nueva Ecija Bespren | 28 |

== Professional status dispute ==
League organizers have stated that FilBasket at that time is amateur league and that there are plans to turn professional in future tournaments. This, however, has been disputed by the Games and Amusements Board (GAB), contending that FilBasket is a professional league hence it should fall under its jurisdiction. Although the organizers were able to push through with the Subic Championship, after the tournament concluded in November, the GAB issued a cease and desist order against FilBasket, once again contending the league's status and ruling the tournament as "unlawful".

=== Resolution ===
On January 19, 2022, the GAB declared it would not pursue legal action but noted that it will continue to monitor the league. FilBasket organizers then subsequently submitted its intention to start the transition to professional status, which would be granted on February 23, 2022, in time for the league's next tournament: the 2022 Summer Championship.
