= 2022 Pilipinas Super League season =

Inaugural tournament of the Pilipinas Super League

- League: Pilipinas Super League
- Sport: Basketball
- Duration: Regular season: March 18 – April 18, 2022; Playoffs: April 19 – 20, 2022; Finals: April 22 – 25, 2022
- Games: 56 (regular season); 6 (playoffs)
- Teams: 8

Regular season
- Top seed: Davao Occidental Tigers
- Season MVP: Gab Dagangon

Finals
- Champions: Davao Occidental Tigers
- Runners-up: Cagayan de Oro Higalas
- Finals MVP: Emman Calo

PSL seasons
- 2022–23 →

The 2022 Pilipinas Super League season, also known as the Pearl of the Orient Cup, was the inaugural season of the Pilipinas Super League (PSL) Pro Division. The regular season began on March 18, 2022, and ended on April 18, 2022. The postseason then ran from April 19 until 25, 2022.

The Davao Occidental Tigers won their first PSL title and second league championship overall after defeating the Cagayan de Oro Higalas in two games. Emman Calo was named as the Finals MVP.

== Teams ==
Locations of teams for the 2022 Pilipinas Super League Pearl of the Orient Cup

Team	Locality	Previous tournament	Best result
Basilan Peace Riders	Basilan	New team	
Bicol Spicy Oragons	Bicol Region	New team	
Cagayan de Oro Higalas	Cagayan de Oro, Misamis Oriental	New team	
Cagayan Valley Golden Eagles	Cagayan Valley	New team	
Davao Occidental Tigers	Davao Occidental	New team	
Lapu-Lapu Chiefs	Lapu-Lapu City, Cebu	New team	
Pagadian Explorers	Pagadian, Zamboanga del Sur	New team	
Roxas Vanguards	Roxas, Zamboanga del Norte	New team	

== Venues ==
Venue	Location	Capacity
Dipolog Sports Complex	Dipolog, Zamboanga del Norte	N/A
Manuel A. Roxas Sports Complex	Roxas, Zamboanga del Norte	N/A
University of Southeastern Philippines	Davao City, Davao del Sur	6,000

Locations of venues

== Regular season ==
The regular season began on March 18, 2022.

=== Format ===
All participating teams played in a double round-robin format, where every team plays each other twice for a total of 14 games. The top four teams advance to a two-round, single-elimination playoff bracket, with each round being best-of-three series.

=== Standings ===
Pos	Team	Pld	W	L	PCT	GB	Qualification
1	z – Davao Occidental Tigers	14	13	1	.929	—	Playoffs
2	x – Roxas Vanguards	14	11	3	.786	2	Playoffs
3	x – Cagayan de Oro Higalas	14	9	5	.643	4	Playoffs
4	x – Basilan Peace Riders	14	8	6	.571	5	Playoffs
5	Lapu-Lapu Chiefs	14	7	7	.500	6	
6	Pagadian Explorers	14	5	9	.357	8	
7	Bicol Spicy Oragons	14	3	11	.214	10	Suspended
8	Cagayan Valley Golden Eagles	14	0	14	.000	13	

Source: Standings
x – Clinched playoffs; z – Clinched best record overall

=== Results ===
Each team plays each other twice. Results on the top-right section are for first-round games; those on the bottom-left section are for second-round games. Number of asterisks after each score denotes number of overtimes played.

Teams	BAS	BCL	CDO	CGV	DVO	LPL	PAG	ROX
Basilan		58–57	89–93	63–62	50–86	75–68	80–70	58–76
Bicol	0–20 (Note: On April 12, 2022, the league suspended Bicol following the team's walkout in their last game against Cagayan de Oro. Every game after Bicol's suspension is considered a forfeit win for the opposing team. Bicol's records pre-suspension remain unaffected.)		82–85	71–59	64–70	81–85	73–67	60–61
Cagayan de Oro	67–73	67–63		69–67	70–83	69–74	80–78	81–89
Cagayan Valley	69–81	48–58	57–64		51–77	79–87	66–69	74–81
Davao Occidental	98–75	20–0	75–51	75–62		88–55	82–59	63–59
Lapu-Lapu	78–72	20–0	78–83	73–69	76–78		98–97	74–86
Pagadian	61–80	67–62	73–83	83–69	60–73	93–90		61–85
Roxas	76–71	20–0	74–79	72–63	79–77	75–70	56–71	

Source: Schedule
Legend: Blue = left column team win; Red = top row team win.
Matches with lighter background shading were decided after overtime.

== Playoffs ==
The playoffs began on April 19, 2022.

=== Bracket ===
Semifinals (Best-of-3)
1	Davao Occidental	74	70	–
4	Basilan	55	55	–
2	Roxas	64	80	–
3	Cagayan de Oro	72	82	–

Finals (Best-of-3)
1	Davao Occidental	95	76	–
3	Cagayan de Oro	59	62	–
Battle for Third (single game)
4	Basilan	59
2	Roxas	66

== Awards ==
The league's individual season awards were handed out before Game 1 of the Finals series on April 22, 2022, at the Manuel Roxas Sports Complex in Roxas, Zamboanga del Norte. The Finals Most Valuable Player was later awarded at the conclusion of series.

Awards	Recipient	Team
Most Valuable Player	Gab Dagangon	Davao Occidental Tigers
Finals Most Valuable Player	Emman Calo	Davao Occidental Tigers
Best Homegrown Player	Vincent Minguito	Lapu-Lapu Chiefs
PSL Mythical Team	Gab Dagangon	Davao Occidental Tigers
PSL Mythical Team	Robby Celiz	Davao Occidental Tigers
PSL Mythical Team	Jason Melano	Basilan Peace Riders
PSL Mythical Team	Mario Bonleon	Roxas Vanguards
PSL Mythical Team	Gin Mejares	Lapu-Lapu Chiefs
