= Shawarma Shack =

Philippine food franchise (e. 2015)

The Shawarma Shack
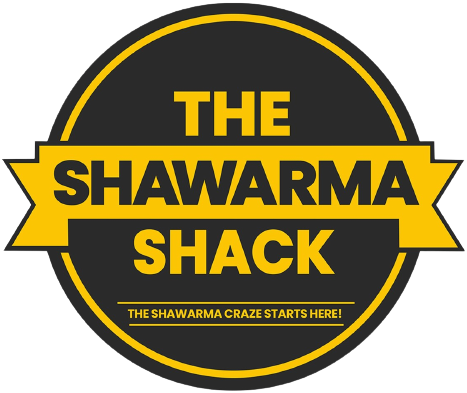
- Product type: Shawarma wraps outlet chain
- Current owner: Walther Uzi Buenavista; Patricia Collantes
- Country: Philippines
- Introduced: 2015; 11 years ago
- Website: https://www.shawarmashack.ph/

The Shawarma Shack is a Philippine food franchise known for its "buy one, get one free" shawarma wraps. It started on February 21, 2015, as a nightly ambulant food stand in Divisoria, Manila operated by Walther Uzi Buenavista and Patricia Collantes. As of 2024, it has over 800 outlets and 1000 employees throughout the Philippines.

== History ==
In 2015, 25-year old Walther Uzi Buenavista and his wife Patricia launched a food stand at the Tutuban Center night market in Manila selling shawarma wraps. Walther would make the pita bread while Patricia would help prepare the ingredients and recipe. The business was initially unsuccessful as daily sales were very low. The couple then decided to gradually close down the stand. In order to clear out the inventory, Walther offered a "buy one, get one free" promotion for his wraps. This proved successful for the business and for the first time, their average daily sales went up.

As the business grew, the couple incorporated the promotion as an integral part of their marketing strategy. One of their first expansions was an open air store in SM City North EDSA which they applied for and subsequently rejected 12 times. Most tenants in the area were short-lived except for the Shawarma Shack outlet which became a top seller, impressing the leasing management.

In October 2016, its first store outside Metro Manila was launched at SM City Dasmariñas in Cavite. Its first store in the Visayas was launched in May 2018 at Elizabeth Mall Cebu while its store in Zamboanga City opened in August 2018 was its first in Mindanao. Currently, the business' products are manufactured from a food facility in Quezon City.

The business contracts Daniel Padilla and Kathryn Bernardo as their brand endorsers.

On July 30, 2025, Shawarma Shack opened its first overseas branch in Singapore at its Toa Payoh location.

== Products ==
The franchise specializes in offering a range of beef and chicken shawarma, available in both spicy and non-spicy variations, served in pita bread. In addition to shawarma, the menu features tikka and kebab wraps, as well as rice meals, catering to a variety of customer preferences.
