= Pilipinas Super League =

Men's professional basketball league in the Philippines

- Most recent season or competition: 2024–25 Pilipinas Super League season
- Sport: Basketball
- Founded: 2021; 5 years ago
- First season: 2022 Pearl of the Orient Cup
- CEO: Cris Bautista
- Commissioner: Gerry Esplana
- Motto: Dito, Pinoy Ang Bida
- No. of teams: 11
- Country: Philippines; Thailand
- Continent: FIBA Asia (Asia)
- Most recent champion: Caloocan Supremos (1st title)
- Most titles: Four teams (1 title each)
- Broadcasters: PSL (Facebook, YouTube)

The Pilipinas Super League (PSL) is a men's professional basketball league in the Philippines.

== History ==
The Pilipinas Super League (PSL) was founded in December 2021 by former officials of the Pilipinas VisMin Super Cup, namely its former CEO Rocky Chan and former COO Chelito Caro. Chan assumed the post of PSL president and Caro the post of league commissioner. Former professional basketballer Marc Pingris was appointed as commissioner in January 2022, succeeding Caro. There are also under-21 and under-18 divisions.

Original logo of the Pilipinas Super League, used from 2022 until 2023.

The league then subsequently held its first Pro Division tournament: the Pearl of the Orient Cup, which saw eight teams compete in venues across Mindanao. Among the teams were two that moved from the Maharlika Pilipinas Basketball League (MPBL): the Basilan Peace Riders and Davao Occidental Tigers, the latter of which became the inaugural champions. The second Pro Division tournament then came later that year with the DUMPER Cup, which saw sixteen teams compete. It was eventually won by the Pampanga G Lanterns, after defeating the defending champion Tigers.

In mid-2023, PSL underwent new management changes with the entry of new president Cris Bautista and league commissioner Allan Caidic. After they left the PSL, the former management went on creating another basketball league, Sinag Liga Asya. The new management went on to start the third Pro Division tournament, the President's Cup. The President's Cup is the league's biggest to date, with 19 competing teams, eventually concluding with the Quezon Titans being crowned the champions.

On May 8, 2024, the PSL became a stakeholder in the country's national basketball federation, the Samahang Basketbol ng Pilipinas.

The PSL is set for the PSL President's Cup 2024–2025 which will begin on December 21, 2024 at Filoil EcoOil Centre in San Juan.

== Format ==
In the current format, all participating teams first play in a single round-robin tournament, wherein every team is expected to play one game against each of the other teams. In 2022, the PSL used a double round-robin format. Qualified teams then advance to the playoffs, which mostly involves best-of-three series, with the overall format varied across different tournaments.

== Pro Division teams ==
The following teams are confirmed to compete in the 2024–25 season.

Team	Locality	Sponsors	Joined	Head coach
Biñan Tatak Gel	Biñan, Laguna	Beast Motorcycle Tire; GameX Sports	2023–24	Boyet Fernandez
Caloocan Supremos	Caloocan	—N/a	2022–23	Gabby Espinas
Chichi Albayanos Wild Catz	Albay	—N/a	2024–25	Jade Padrigao
Davao del Norte – Pablo Valiant Kings	Davao del Norte	Pablo EscoBets	2024–25	Nel Prado
GenSan Warriors	General Santos	—N/a	2024–25	Elvis Tolentino
Pangasinan Abono Reapers	Pangasinan	Abono Partylist	2024–25	Jerson Cabiltes
Pilipinas Navy Aguilas	—N/a	Philippine Navy	2024–25	Winston Sergio
Pureblends Similan Black Fox	Similan Islands, Thailand	Pureblends Corporation	2024–25	Raymond Valenzona
San Juan Kings	San Juan	Powerball Marketing & Logistics Corporation	2022–23	Randy Alcantara
Top Tier Athletics – Lipa Batangas Stallions	Lipa, Batangas	Top Tier Athletics	2024–25	Mark Pangilinan
Verdiamonds Jewellers	Malabon	Verdiamonds Jewelry Incorporated	2024–25	Eric Sy

== Previous teams ==
Team	Locality	Sponsors	Joined	Last season
Alpha Omega Jikiri Indanan Sulu Kings	Indanan, Sulu	—N/a	2023–24	
ARS Warriors – San Pedro, Laguna	San Pedro, Laguna	ARS Warriors Sports Center	2022–23	
Bagong Cabuyao Homelab Nation	Cabuyao, Laguna	Aclan Group of Companies	2022–23	
Basilan BRT	Lamitan, Basilan	BRT Sumisip	2022	
Bicol Spicy Oragons	Bicol Region	Worthrand Petropower Corporation	2022	2023–24
Boracay Islanders	Boracay, Malay, Aklan	—N/a	2022–23	
Cagayan de Oro Higalas	Cagayan de Oro, Misamis Oriental	FSD Auto Insurance Services	2022	
Cagayan de Oro – PSP	Cagayan de Oro, Misamis Oriental	Philippine Sports Performance	2022–23	
Cagayan Valley Golden Eagles	Cagayan Valley	—N/a	2022	
Cam Norte Warriors	Camarines Norte	—N/a	2023–24	
CV Siniloan Daruma Dragons	Siniloan, Laguna	Pureblends Corporation	2023–24	
Davao Occidental Tigers	Davao Occidental	United Coconut Planters Life Assurance Corporation	2022	2023–24
JT Bulacan Taipan	Bulacan	—N/a	2023–24	
Koponang Lakan ng Bulacan	Bulacan	—N/a	2022–23	
Lapu-Lapu Chiefs	Lapu-Lapu City, Cebu	ARQ Builders	2022	
Manila CityStars	Manila	Czar Concept Solution	2022–23	2023–24
MisOr Mustangs	Misamis Oriental	Awesam Smile	2023–24	
1Munti XUR Homes	Muntinlupa	XUR Homes Realty Inc.	2022–23	2023–24
NKT Sniper	—N/a	—N/a	2023–24	
Novaliches QC Warriors	Novaliches, Quezon City	—N/a	2023–24	
Nueva Ecija Capitals	Nueva Ecija	—N/a	2023–24	
Nueva Ecija Slashers	Nueva Ecija	—N/a	2022–23	
Pagadian Explorers	Pagadian, Zamboanga del Sur	—N/a	2022	
Pampanga G Lanterns	Pampanga	AMG3 Construction	2022–23	
Pampanga Royce	Pampanga	Royce Hotel & Casino	2022–23	
Quezon City Beacons	Quezon City	—N/a	2022–23	
Quezon Titans	Quezon		2023–24	
RCP–Shawarma Shack Demigods	—N/a	Shawarma Shack	2023–24	
Roxas Vanguards	Roxas, Zamboanga del Norte	—N/a	2022	
San Pedro — Pablo EscoBets	San Pedro, Laguna	Pablo EscoBets	2023–24	
Santa Rosa Laguna Lions	Santa Rosa, Laguna	—N/a	2022–23	
Strong Group Athletics — Benilde Blazers	Manila	Strong Group Athletics	2023–24	

== Youth Division teams ==
=== 21-Under ===
2024 Global Championship Challenge
Team	Locality / Country	Sponsors
Davao NTB Wolves	Davao City	—N/a
FIL-NZ Nation Select	New Zealand	FIL-NZ Nation Select
GIGG Canada	Canada	GIGG Canada
Italy FilCom	Italy	FilCom Italy Basketball Association
NABA Intercity	United States	North American Basketball Association
UK KAMPI	United Kingdom	KAMPI Filipino-British Basketball

2023 National Championship
Team	Locality	Sponsors
Batang Kankaloo	Caloocan	—N/a
Luid Kapampangan	San Fernando, Pampanga	Endless Plus
Keanzel Basketball	—N/a	—N/a
NEU Hunters	Quezon City	New Era University
Phenom Aguilas	—N/a	Phenom Championship Clinic
San Juan Kings	San Juan	Powerball Marketing & Logistics Corporation
UMak Hardy Herons	Makati	University of Makati
UST Tiger Cubs	Manila	University of Santo Tomas

2022 National Championship
Team	Locality	Sponsors
Luzon
Immaculada Concepcion College Blue Hawks	Caloocan	Immaculada Concepcin College
Luid Kapampangan	San Fernando, Pampanga	—N/a
NBS Kris	Cainta, Rizal; Tawi-Tawi	—N/a
Pampanga Delta	San Fernando, Pampanga	—N/a
Parañaque Worthrand	Parañaque	Worthrand Petropower Corporation
Pasig Pirates	Pasig	United Coconut Planters Life Assurance Corporation
Prime C Forte Warriors	—N/a	Megaworks Corporation
QC-Bohol Dolphins	Quezon City; Bohol	—N/a
VisMin
Asturias (Cebu) Corn Ranchers	Asturias, Cebu	—N/a
City of Bogo (Cebu) Bogoys	Bogo, Cebu	—N/a
Bukidnon Cowboys	Bukidnon	IBA College of Mindanao
Cagayan de Oro Sealcor Kingfishers	Cagayan de Oro	—N/a
Consolacion Sarok Weavers	Consolacion, Cebu	—N/a
Davao Occidental Dreamers	Davao Occidental	—N/a
Lapu-Lapu Pantum	Lapu-Lapu City, Cebu	—N/a
Sherilin-Unisol Mandaue	Mandaue, Cebu	Cebu Sherilin Trading Corporation; Unisol Philippines
OCCCI Ormoc Sheer Masters	Ormoc, Leyte	Metro Ormoc Community Multi-Purpose Cooperative, Inc.
San Fernando (Cebu) Buffalos	San Fernando, Cebu	—N/a

2022 Aspirants' Cup
Team	Locality	Sponsors
Bukidnon Cowboys	Bukidnon	IBA College of Mindanao
Cagayan de Oro Sealcor Kingfishers	Cagayan de Oro	—N/a
Consolacion Sarok Weavers	Consolacion, Cebu	—N/a
Iligan Archangels	Iligan, Lanao del Norte	—N/a
KSB Iligan Crusaders	Iligan, Lanao del Norte	—N/a
BYB Kapatagan Buffalos	Kapatagan, Lanao del Norte	—N/a
ARQ Builders Lapu-Lapu Chiefs	Lapu-Lapu City, Cebu	ARQ Builders
Roxas Vanguards	Roxas, Zamboanga del Norte	—N/a

=== 18-Under ===
2024 Global Championship Challenge
Team	Locality / Country	Sponsors
FIL-NZ Nation Select	New Zealand	FIL-NZ Nation Select
GIGG Canada	Canada	GIGG Canada
NABA Intercity	United States	North American Basketball Association
Traill International School	Thailand	Traill International School
UK KAMPI	United Kingdom	KAMPI Filipino-British Basketball
USJR Jaguars	Cebu City	University of San Jose-Recoletos

2023 National Championship
Team	Locality	Sponsors
NCR
Batang Kankaloo	Caloocan	—N/a
EZ Jersey Doc Boleros	Quezon City	EZ Jersey
Farm Fresh Milkers - Letran	Manila	Farm Fresh Philippines; Colegio de San Juan de Letran
Fin & Claw Grill x Kalos PH	Quezon City	Fin & Claw Grill; Kalos PH Sportswear
Magnificent Manila	Manila	—N/a
Mandaluyong Namayan Tigre	Mandaluyong	—N/a
Mapua 521 Trading	Manila	521 Trading, Inc. Mapúa University
NBS Kris	Cainta, Rizal; Tawi-Tawi	—N/a
NEU Baby Hunters	Quezon City	New Era University
Taytay Builders	Taytay, Rizal	—N/a
Luzon
AGC Strong	—N/a	Aclan Group of Companies
Bagong Cabuyao Titans	Cabuyao, Laguna	—N/a
Batang Lakan ng Bulacan	Malolos, Bulacan	—N/a
Calamba City Patriots	Calamba, Laguna	—N/a
Datzlav x JA.VI - Sta. Cruz Builders	Santa Cruz, Laguna	Datzlav Construction; JA.VI Construction
LDG San Pedro	San Pedro, Laguna	Legend Dream Guild Academy
Luid Kapampangan	San Fernando, Pampanga	—N/a
Pampanga Delta	San Fernando, Pampanga	Pradera Islands Amusement Park
Quezon Province - 2nd District	Quezon	—N/a
Visayas
Consolacion Sarok Weavers	Consolacion, Cebu	—N/a
GM Seafront Splashers	Consolacion, Cebu	—N/a
Consolacion Black Shama	Consolacion, Cebu	—N/a
Sherilin Khalifa - City of Naga	Naga, Cebu	Cebu Sherilin Trading Corporation
Sidlak Danao	Danao, Cebu	—N/a
Basak Where I Belong	Lalu-Lapu City, Cebu	—N/a
Dea's Bakeshop x RAD	Cebu City, Cebu	RAD Chameleon Apparel; Dea's Bakeshop
Mindanao – North
Albion Knights	Ozamiz, Misamis Occiental	—N/a
Cagayan de Oro Higalas A	Cagayan de Oro, Misamis Oriental	—N/a
Cagayan de Oro Higalas B	Cagayan de Oro, Misamis Oriental	—N/a
Maanyag Maramag	Maramag, Bukidnon	—N/a
Meljohn's Tailoring	Malaybalay, Bukidnon	Meljohn's Tailoring
Rhilapz Notbalz	Cagayan de Oro, Misamis Oriental	—N/a
TUCP/Serbisyong Totoo - Cotabato	Kidapawan, Cotabato	—N/a
Uswag Magpet	Magpet, Cotabato	—N/a
Mindanao – South
Cantilan Gugmart Bravehearts	Cantilan, Surigao del Sur	Gugmart Trading
DavNor Future Legends	Tagum, Davao del Norte	—N/a
MP Pacman Davao	Davao City, Davao del Sur	Immanuel School of Davao
Max Ballers Davao	Davao City, Davao del Sur	—N/a
Timber City Academy Dragons	Butuan, Agusan del Norte	Timber City Academy

=== 16-Under ===
2024 Global Championship Challenge
Team	Locality / Country	Sponsors
FIL-NZ Nation Select	New Zealand	FIL-NZ Nation Select
GIGG Canada	Canada	GIGG Canada
Luid Kapampangan	Pampanga	—N/a
NABA Intercity	United States	North American Basketball Association

== Seasons ==
Regular season			Playoffs		No. of teams	No. of games	Ref.
Year	Top seed	Record	Champion	Runner-up	No. of teams	No. of games	Ref.
2022; Pearl of the Orient Cup	Davao Occidental Tigers	13–1 (.929)	Davao Occidental Tigers	Cagayan de Oro Higalas	8	14 (Note: The Bicol Spicy Oragons only played ten games in the 2022 season before getting suspended.)	
2022–23; DUMPER Cup	San Juan Kings	15–0 (1.000)	Pampanga G Lanterns	Davao Occidental Tigers	16	15	
2023–24; President's Cup	Biñan Tatak Gel	17–1 (.944)	Quezon Titans	Nueva Ecija Capitals	19	18	
2024–25; President's Cup	Caloocan Supremos	9–1 (.900)	Caloocan Supremos	San Juan Kings	11	10	

== Champions ==
=== Pro Division ===
Conference	Champion	Series	Runner-up
2022; Pearl of the Orient Cup	Davao Occidental Tigers	2–0	Cagayan de Oro Higalas
2022–23; DUMPER Cup	Pampanga G Lanterns	2–0	Davao Occidental Tigers
2023–24; President's Cup	Quezon Titans	3–1	Nueva Ecija Capitals
2024–25; President's Cup	Caloocan Supremos	2–1	San Juan Kings

=== 21-Under Division ===
Conference	Champion	Runner-up
2022; Aspirants Cup	Consolacion Sarok Weavers	Roxas Vanguards
2022; National Championship	Pampanga Delta	Consolacion Sarok Weavers
2023; National Championship	NEU Hunters	San Juan Kings
2024; Global Championship Challenge	Davao NTB Wolves	NABA Intercity (North America)

=== 18-Under Division ===
Conference	Champion	Runner-up
2023; National Championship	Pampanga Delta and Farm Fresh Milkers^{1}	
2024; Global Championship Challenge	Traill International School (Thailand)	GIGG (Canada)

=== 16-Under Division ===
Conference	Champion	Runner-up
2024; Global Championship Challenge	NABA Intercity (North America)	Luid Kapampangan

Notes

1. The championship series was delayed multiple times, but was eventually not played. Both Pampanga and Farm Fresh are declared co-champions.

=== Other tournaments ===
Tournament	Champion	Score	Runner-up
D2 Super Cup	Siomai King	83–76	Tiaong Meaksyon
