= 2024 MPBL playoffs =

Playoffs for the Maharlika Pilipinas Basketball League's 2024 season

2024 MPBL Playoffs presented by Xtreme and MPBL Partylist

Tournament details
- Country: Philippines
- Dates: October 5 – December 7, 2024
- Teams: 16
- Defending champions: Pampanga Giant Lanterns

Final positions
- Champions: Pampanga Giant Lanterns
- Runners-up: Quezon Huskers
- Semifinalists: San Juan Knights; Batangas City Tanduay Rum Masters

Tournament statistics
- Matches played: 35

The 2024 MPBL playoffs was the postseason tournament of the Maharlika Pilipinas Basketball League's 2024 season, the league's sixth overall, and the fifth under the 16-team format. The postseason tournament began on October 5, four days after the conclusion of the regular season, and ended on December 7, 2024. For sponsorship reasons, this year's playoffs is also known as the 2024 MPBL Playoffs presented by Xtreme and MPBL Partylist.

== Overview ==
=== Updates to playoff appearances ===
- The San Juan Knights entered the playoffs for the fifth consecutive season and also clinch the best record in the league for the first time since 2020.
- The Quezon Huskers entered the playoffs for the second consecutive season and also clinch the best record in the South Division for the first time in franchise history.
- The Batangas City Tanduay Rum Masters entered the playoffs for the sixth consecutive season, currently the longest playoff streak in the MPBL.
- The South Cotabato Warriors and Zamboanga Master Sardines entered the playoffs for the fifth consecutive season.
- The Pampanga Giant Lanterns entered the playoffs for the fourth consecutive season.
- The Nueva Ecija Rice Vanguards entered the playoffs for the third consecutive season.
- The Caloocan Batang Kankaloo and Pasay Voyagers entered the playoffs for the second consecutive season.
- The Rizal Golden Coolers entered the playoffs for the first time since 2022.
- The Davao Occidental Tigers and Manila Batang Sampaloc entered the playoffs for the first time since 2020.
- The Parañaque Patriots entered the playoffs for the first time since 2018.
- The Abra Weavers, Biñan Tatak Gel, and Negros Muscovados entered the playoffs for the first time in franchise history.
  - Biñan and Parañaque also ended the league's longest playoff droughts to date, after both teams missed the playoffs the last four seasons.
- The Iloilo United Royals and Imus Agimat missed the playoffs after making the postseason last season.
- The Marikina Shoemasters and Muntinlupa Cagers missed the playoffs for the first time since 2020.
- The Mindoro Tamaraws missed the playoffs for the fourth consecutive season, the longest active playoff drought in the league and tied for the longest playoff drought overall.
- Due to their departures from the league:
  - Makati missed the playoffs after making the postseason last season.
  - Pasig City missed the playoffs for the first time since 2019.
  - Bacoor City missed the playoffs for the first time in franchise history, having made the playoffs since 2019.

=== Notable events ===
- This marked the first time since 2018 and the second time overall that a Cavite team doesn't make the playoffs.
- The San Juan Knights, South Cotabato Warriors, and Zamboanga Master Sardines joined the Batangas City Tanduay Rum Masters as the only teams to have made at least five playoff appearances in the MPBL.
- This is the first time that Western Visayas doesn't have a team make the playoffs since the region's entry into the league in the 2019–20 season.
- The San Juan Knights became the first team in league history to clinch the top seed in two seasons, with the first coming in 2020.

==== Division finals ====
- The San Juan Knights and Batangas City Tanduay Rum Masters became the first teams to make the penultimate round of the playoffs five times.
  - Additionally, San Juan became the first team to make five division finals, as well as make five consecutive division finals.
- The San Juan–Pampanga matchup in the North Division finals marked the first division finals rematch in league history, having previously met in 2023.

==== National finals ====
- The Pampanga Giant Lanterns became the second team in league history to make two national finals and also the second to do so in back-to-back seasons, both following the 2020 San Juan Knights.
- The Quezon Huskers became the first expansion team from the professional era to reach the national finals.

== Format ==
The top eight teams from each division advance to the playoffs. Seeding is based on wins, with tiebreaker rules applied should multiple teams have the same record. The single-elimination bracket consists of four rounds with no reseeding. The first three rounds being best-of-three series and the national finals being a best-of-five series.

During the first two rounds, two games within the same division are played in a gameday, with homecourt advantage alternating between the higher-seeded teams of each series. A traditional homecourt format is then used for the last two rounds, with the division finals using a 1–1–1 format and the national finals using a 2–2–1 format. The designated home team may not be able to play within its home locality. Should it occur, the gameday may take place elsewhere.

== Division standings ==
**North Division**

Pos	Team	Pld	W	L	GB
1	San Juan Knights	28	26 (Note: San Juan wins tiebreaker over Pampanga based on head-to-head record.)	2	—
2	Pampanga Giant Lanterns	28	26	2	—
3	Nueva Ecija Rice Vanguards	28	24	4	2
4	Manila SV Batang Sampaloc	28	20	8	6
5	Caloocan Batang Kankaloo	28	19	9	7
6	Pasay Voyagers	28	18 (Note: Pasay wins tiebreaker over Abra based on head-to-head record.)	10	8
7	Abra Weavers	28	18	10	8
8	Rizal Golden Coolers	28	15 (Note: Rizal wins tiebreaker over Quezon City based on head-to-head record.)	13	11

Source: Standings
Notes:

**South Division**

Pos	Team	Pld	W	L	GB
1	Quezon Huskers	28	21	7	—
2	Batangas City Tanduay Rum Masters	28	20 (Note: Batangas City (1.132), Biñan (0.950), and Zamboanga (0.931) are ranked based on head-to-head point quotient.)	8	1
3	Biñan Tatak Gel	28	20	8	1
4	Zamboanga Master Sardines	28	20	8	1
5	Parañaque Patriots	28	17 (Note: Parañaque wins tiebreaker over South Cotabato based on head-to-head record.)	11	4
6	South Cotabato Warriors	28	17	11	4
7	Davao Occidental Tigers	28	15	13	6
8	Negros Muscovados	28	12	16	9

Source: Standings

=== Bracket ===
Teams in bold advanced to the next round. Teams in italics have homecourt advantage for the series. The numbers to the left of each team indicate the team's seeding in its division, while the numbers to the right indicate the number of games the team won in that round.

Division quarterfinals (best-of-3)	Division semifinals (best-of-3)
N1	**San Juan**	**2**
N8	Rizal	0
N1	**San Juan**	**2**
N5	Caloocan	0
N4	Manila	0
N5	**Caloocan**	**2**
**North Division**
N2	**Pampanga**	**2**
N7	Abra	0
N2	**Pampanga**	**2**
N3	Nueva Ecija	0
N3	**Nueva Ecija**	**2**
N6	Pasay	0
S1	**Quezon**	**2**
S8	Negros	0
S1	**Quezon**	**2**
S5	Parañaque	0
S4	Zamboanga	1
S5	**Parañaque**	**2**
**South Division**
S2	**Batangas City**	**2**
S7	Davao Occidental	0
S2	**Batangas City**	**2**
S6	South Cotabato	1
S3	Biñan	1
S6	**South Cotabato**	**2**

Division finals (best-of-3)
N1	San Juan	0
N2	**Pampanga**	**2**
S1	**Quezon**	**2**
S2	Batangas City	1

National finals (best-of-5)
N2	**Pampanga**	**3**
S1	Quezon	0

== Division quarterfinals ==
NOTE: All times are Philippine Standard Time (UTC+8:00).

=== North Division quarterfinals ===
==== (1) San Juan Knights vs. (8) Rizal Golden Coolers ====
MPTV

October 5
8:00 pm

Boxscore

San Juan Knights	79–64	Rizal Golden Coolers
Scoring by quarter: 17–16, 21–12, 24–22, 17–14
Pts: Michael Calisaan 16; Rebs: three players 5 Asts: Reynel Hugnatan 6		Pts: Alwyn Alday, Marco Balagtas 13; Rebs: Marco Balagtas 10; Asts: Kraniel Villoria, Val Chauca 5
San Juan leads series, 1–0

Filoil EcoOil Centre, San Juan

After a close first quarter, San Juan were able to outscore Rizal by nine to lead by ten points going to the second half. San Juan didn't back down since then, leading by as much as 22 points and eventually winning the game.

Michael Calisaan led all scorers with 16 out of 47 points coming off San Juan's bench. Dexter Maiquez and Reynel Hugnatan also scored double-digits for San Juan. Alwyn Alday and Marco Balagtas led Rizal's scoring with 13 points each, with the latter also recording a double-double with 10 rebounds.

MPTV

October 12
6:00 pm

Boxscore

Rizal Golden Coolers	70–82	San Juan Knights
Scoring by quarter: 18–25, 19–16, 20–17, 13–24
Pts: Val Chauca 14; Rebs: Chad Alonzo 9 Asts: Val Chauca 4		Pts: Michael Calisaan 22; Rebs: Michael Calisaan, Dexter Maiquez, 8 Asts: Agem Miranda 9
San Juan wins series, 2–0

Paco Arena, Manila

The end of the third quarter saw the game being separated by one point. After Valandre Chauca tied the game at 63, San Juan went on an eight-point scoring run as the Knights won by 12 points and advance to the division semifinals.

Michael Calisaan went 9-for-10 from the field to lead all scorers with 22 points alongside eight rebounds and two steals. Nikko Panganiban and Orlan Wamar Jr. also scored double digits while Agem Miranda led the assists department with 9. For Rizal, Val Chauca, Alwyn Alday, and Riego Gamalinda recorded double-digit scoring in the losing effort, with Alonzo also recording nine rebounds.

Head-to-head matchup

MPTV

June 10
8:00 pm

Boxscore

San Juan Knights	100–103 (3OT)	Rizal Golden Coolers
Scoring by quarter: 23–20, 17–14, 23–18, 6–17, Overtime: 31–35
Pts: Dexter Maiquez 21; Rebs: Dexter Maiquez 11; Asts: Orlan Wamar Jr. 9		Pts: Alwyn Alday 27; Rebs: John Apacible 15; Asts: Kraniel Villoria 10

Filoil EcoOil Centre, San Juan

This is the first playoff meeting between San Juan and Rizal.

==== (2) Pampanga Giant Lanterns vs. (7) Abra Weavers ====
MPTV

October 8
8:00 pm

Boxscore

Pampanga Giant Lanterns	79–64	Abra Weavers
Scoring by quarter: 11–16, 29–10, 24–18, 13–20
Pts: Justine Baltazar 24; Rebs: Justine Baltazar 16; Asts: Justine Baltazar, Kurt Reyson 7		Pts: Wendell Comboy 20; Rebs: Jappy Faundo 10; Asts: Roi Sumang 5
Pampanga leads series, 1–0

Bren Z. Guiao Convention Center, San Fernando, Pampanga

MPTV

October 16
6:00 pm

Boxscore

Abra Weavers	65–66	Pampanga Giant Lanterns
Scoring by quarter: 12–17, 21–12, 15–21, 17–16
Pts: Ryan Batino 16; Rebs: Ryan Batino 9 Asts: Keanu Caballero 6		Pts: Archie Concepcion 16; Rebs: Justine Baltazar 17; Asts: Encho Serrano 6
Pampanga wins series, 2–0

Nueva Ecija Coliseum, Palayan, Nueva Ecija

Head-to-head matchup

MPTV

September 10
6:00 pm

Boxscore

Abra Weavers	79–88	Pampanga Giant Lanterns
Scoring by quarter: 19–21, 20–23, 21–22, 19–22
Pts: Mark Yee 18; Rebs: Ryan Batino 7 Asts: Keanu Caballero 7		Pts: Archie Concepcion 18; Rebs: Justine Baltazar 13; Asts: Justine Baltazar 10

FPJ Arena, San Jose, Batangas

This is the first playoff meeting Pampanga and Abra.

==== (3) Nueva Ecija Rice Vanguards vs. (6) Pasay Voyagers ====
MPTV

October 8
6:00 pm

Boxscore

Pasay Voyagers	72–82	Nueva Ecija Rice Vanguards
Scoring by quarter: 19–28, 15–13, 19–19, 19–22
Pts: Laurenz Victoria 24; Rebs: Warren Bonifacio 15; Asts: Warren Bonifacio 5		Pts: Robby Celiz 23; Rebs: Will McAloney 8 Asts: Will McAloney, JC Cullar 5
Nueva Ecija leads series, 1–0

Bren Z. Guiao Convention Center, San Fernando, Pampanga

MPTV

October 16
8:00 pm

Boxscore

Nueva Ecija Rice Vanguards	75–72	Pasay Voyagers
Scoring by quarter: 13–21, 17–12, 24–13, 21–26
Pts: John Wilson 14; Rebs: Will McAloney 12; Asts: JC Cullar 4		Pts: Warren Bonifacio 19; Rebs: Warren Bonifacio 14; Asts: Paul Manalang 4
Nueva Ecija wins series, 2–0

Nueva Ecija Coliseum, Palayan, Nueva Ecija

Head-to-head matchup

MPTV

September 27
6:00 pm

Boxscore

Pasay Voyagers	64–63	Nueva Ecija Rice Vanguards
Scoring by quarter: 11–13, 7–12, 25–21, 21–17
Pts: Laurenz Victoria 14; Rebs: Warren Bonifacio 9 Asts: Warren Bonifacio 4		Pts: JB Bahio 13; Rebs: Chester Saldua 7 Asts: JK Mocon 5

Caloocan Sports Complex, Caloocan

This is the second playoff meeting Nueva Ecija and Pasay with Nueva Ecija winning the previous meeting.

Previous playoffs series
Nueva Ecija leads 1–0 in all-time playoff series

2023

Nueva Ecija Rice Vanguards 2, Pasay Voyagers 0

2023 Northern Division quarterfinals

==== (4) Manila Batang Sampaloc vs. (5) Caloocan Batang Kankaloo ====
MPTV

October 5
6:00 pm

Boxscore

Manila Batang Sampaloc	78–79	Caloocan Batang Kankaloo
Scoring by quarter: 13–19, 17–24, 22–17, 26–19
Pts: Greg Slaughter, Jorey Napoles 16; Rebs: Greg Slaughter, Jorey Napoles 10; Asts: Lorenzo Navarro 8		Pts: Jeramer Cabanag 22; Rebs: Gabby Espinas 9 Asts: Alejandrino Iñigo 5
Caloocan leads series, 1–0

Filoil EcoOil Centre, San Juan

Caloocan held a 20-point lead during the second quarter, but as the game went on, Manila began catching up, decreasing the Batang Kankaloo's lead to just one point. The latter part of the fourth quarter saw multiple ejections, including the leading scorers for both teams in Jeramer Cabanag and Greg Slaughter.

In the final moments, as Caloocan led by three, Jorey Napoles got fouled as Joco Tayongtong made one of two free throws to make it a two-possession game with 4.7 seconds remaining. Joshua Torralba hit a buzzer-beating three-pointer to end the game as Caloocan won game 1 by one point.

MPTV

October 12
8:00 pm

Boxscore

Caloocan Batang Kankaloo	67–66	Manila Batang Sampaloc
Scoring by quarter: 18–17, 9–15, 26–15, 14–19
Pts: Jeramer Cabanag 15; Rebs: Jun Bonsubre 11; Asts: Irven Palencia 5		Pts: Joshua Torralba 21; Rebs: Jorey Napoles 13; Asts: Lorenzo Navarro 4
Caloocan wins series, 2–0

Paco Arena, Manila

As Slaughter recorded two unsportsmanlike fouls in game 1, he will be suspended for game 2. Manila attempted to file an appeal but was rejected by the league.

Head-to-head matchup

MPTV

April 23
8:00 pm

Boxscore

Caloocan Batang Kankaloo	66–69	Manila Batang Sampaloc
Scoring by quarter: 19–14, 12–13, 16–14, 19–28
Pts: Gabby Espinas 12; Rebs: Antonio Bonsubre 10; Asts: Irven Palencia 7		Pts: Carl Bryan Cruz 18; Rebs: Carl Bryan Cruz 6 Asts: Paolo Javelona 6

San Andres Sports Complex, San Andres, Manila

This is the first playoff meeting Manila and Caloocan.

=== South Division quarterfinals ===
==== (1) Quezon Huskers vs. (8) Negros Muscovados ====
MPTV

October 7
8:00 pm

Boxscore

Quezon Huskers	73–60	Negros Muscovados
Scoring by quarter: 20–11, 17–16, 20–16, 16–17
Pts: Judel Fuentes 17; Rebs: LJ Gonzales 10; Asts: Judel Fuentes, LJ Gonzales 4		Pts: Renz Palma 12; Rebs: Renz Palma 11; Asts: Renz Palma 6
Quezon leads series, 1–0

Quezon Convention Center, Lucena

MPTV

October 14
6:00 pm

Boxscore

Negros Muscovados	66–94	Quezon Huskers
Scoring by quarter: 21–16, 10–28, 11–20, 24–30
Pts: Felipe Chavez 20; Rebs: Ryan Reyes 9 Asts: Felipe Chavez 8		Pts: RJ Minerva 16; Rebs: Robin Roño, Rodel Gravera 6 Asts: Gab Banal 5
Quezon wins series, 2–0

Mayor Vitaliano D. Agan Coliseum, Zamboanga City

Head-to-head matchup

MPTV

June 1
6:00 pm

Boxscore

Negros Muscovados	62–73	Quezon Huskers
Scoring by quarter: 18–18, 10–20, 24–18, 10–17
Pts: Hubert Cani 19; Rebs: Mark Atabay 10; Asts: Renz Palma 4		Pts: Rodel Gravera 18; Rebs: Rodel Gravera 12; Asts: LJ Gonzales 8

Bren Z. Guiao Convention Center, San Fernando, Pampanga

This is the first playoff meeting between Negros and Quezon.

==== (2) Batangas City Tanduay Rum Masters vs. (7) Davao Occidental Tigers ====
MPTV

October 10
8:00 pm

Boxscore

Batangas City Tanduay Rum Masters	76–66	Davao Occidental Tigers
Scoring by quarter: 16–14, 21–10, 28–24, 11–18
Pts: Levi Hernandez 21; Rebs: Jeckster Apinan 10; Asts: Philip Paniamogan 5		Pts: Keith Agovida 14; Rebs: Bonbon Custodio 7 Asts: Arth dela Cruz 6
Batangas City leads series, 1–0

Batangas City Coliseum, Batangas City, Batangas

MPTV

October 17
6:00 pm

Boxscore

Davao Occidental Tigers	86–89	Batangas City Tanduay Rum Masters
Scoring by quarter: 16–23, 25–18, 27–32, 18–16
Pts: Terrence Tumalip 19; Rebs: Arth dela Cruz 10; Asts: Arth dela Cruz 6		Pts: Levi Hernandez 20; Rebs: Cedric Ablaza 10; Asts: Jeckster Apinan 6
Batangas City wins series, 2–0

Alonte Sports Arena, Biñan, Laguna

Head-to-head matchup

MPTV

May 15
8:00 pm

Boxscore

Davao Occidental Tigers	59–71	Batangas City Tanduay Rum Masters
Scoring by quarter: 20–12, 13–21, 10–17, 16–21
Pts: Kenneth Ighalo 18; Rebs: Mark Sarangay, Yutien Andrada 6 Asts: Arth dela Cruz, Jun Manzo 3		Pts: Juneric Baloria 15; Rebs: Cedric Ablaza 11; Asts: MJ dela Virgen 7

Batangas City Coliseum, Batangas City

This is the second playoff meeting Batangas City and Davao Occidental with Davao Occidental winning the previous meeting.

Previous playoffs series
Davao Occidental leads 1–0 in all-time playoff series

2018–19

Davao Occidental Tigers 2, Batangas City Athletics 1

2019 Southern Division finals

==== (3) Biñan Tatak Gel vs. (6) South Cotabato Warriors ====
MPTV

October 10
6:00 pm

Boxscore

South Cotabato Warriors	85–82	Biñan Tatak Gel
Scoring by quarter: 17–21, 15–18, 26–25, 27–18
Pts: Mark Cruz 24; Rebs: Felix Apreku 9 Asts: Larry Rodriguez, Mark Cruz 3		Pts: Kenny Rocacurva 24; Rebs: Marc Pingris 8 Asts: Robbie Manalang 3
South Cotabato leads series, 1–0

Batangas City Coliseum, Batangas City, Batangas

Biñan led by as much as 12 points during the game and were leading by four points with 1:35 remaining. However, South Cotabato would go on a 7–0 run to take the lead and eventually win the game.

MPTV

October 17
8:00 pm

Boxscore

Biñan Tatak Gel	70–69	South Cotabato Warriors
Scoring by quarter: 24–23, 14–16, 12–23, 20–7
Pts: Marc Pingris 13; Rebs: Kenny Rocacurva 7 Asts: Kenny Rocacurva 4		Pts: Larry Rodriguez, Val Acuña 13; Rebs: Marwin Dionisio 8 Asts: Mark Cruz 6
Series tied, 1–1

Alonte Sports Arena, Biñan, Laguna

MPTV

October 23
7:00 pm

Boxscore

Biñan Tatak Gel	77–79	South Cotabato Warriors
Scoring by quarter: 21–13, 21–32, 18–21, 10–13
Pts: Carlo Lastimosa 29; Rebs: Carlo Lastimosa 10; Asts: Pamboy Raymundo 4		Pts: Jervy Cruz 18; Rebs: JP Calvo 6 Asts: Mark Cruz 10
South Cotabato wins series, 2–1

Alonte Sports Arena, Biñan, Laguna

Head-to-head matchup

MPTV

June 6
8:00 pm

Boxscore

South Cotabato Warriors	82–81	Biñan Tatak Gel
Scoring by quarter: 26–24, 18–19, 16–28, 22–10
Pts: Christian Fajarito 19; Rebs: Jammer Jamito 11; Asts: Nico Elorde 8		Pts: Jaymar Gimpayan 18; Rebs: Jaymar Gimpayan 11; Asts: Pamboy Raymundo 9

Alonte Sports Arena, Biñan, Laguna

This is the first playoff meeting Biñan and South Cotabato.

==== (4) Zamboanga Master Sardines vs. (5) Parañaque Patriots ====
MPTV

October 7
6:00 pm

Boxscore

Parañaque Patriots	83–79	Zamboanga Master Sardines
Scoring by quarter: 19–11, 17–25, 22–21, 25–22
Pts: JP Sarao 21; Rebs: John Uduba 11; Asts: Philip Manalang 6		Pts: Jaycee Marcelino 18; Rebs: Joseph Gabayni 8 Asts: Jaycee Marcelino, Renzo Subido 5
Parañaque leads series, 1–0

Quezon Convention Center, Lucena

MPTV

October 14
8:00 pm

Boxscore

Zamboanga Master Sardines	94–72	Parañaque Patriots
Scoring by quarter: 22–15, 20–26, 26–17, 26–14
Pts: Bong Galanza 20; Rebs: Joseph Gabayni 13; Asts: RJ Barcuma 6		Pts: JP Sarao 14; Rebs: John Uduba 7 Asts: four players 4
Series tied, 1–1

Mayor Vitaliano D. Agan Coliseum, Zamboanga City

MPTV

October 21
7:00 pm

Boxscore

Zamboanga Master Sardines	70–72	Parañaque Patriots
Scoring by quarter: 16–18, 17–16, 24–21, 13–17
Pts: Renz Subido 13; Rebs: Jaycee Marcelino 9 Asts: Jaycee Marcelino 5		Pts: Kristian Hernandez 17; Rebs: Philip Manalang 13; Asts: Philip Manalang 3
Parañaque wins series, 2–1

Mayor Vitaliano D. Agan Coliseum, Zamboanga City

Head-to-head matchup

MPTV

May 22
8:00 pm

Boxscore

Zamboanga Master Sardines	62–65	Parañaque Patriots
Scoring by quarter: 21–19, 13–15, 7–17, 21–14
Pts: Jaycee Marcelino 18; Rebs: John Mahari 8 Asts: Jaycee Marcelino, Kenneth Alas 4		Pts: JP Sarao 17; Rebs: John Oduba 8 Asts: Philip Manalang 7

Alonte Sports Arena, Biñan

This is the first playoff meeting Zamboanga and Parañaque.

== Division semifinals ==
NOTE: All times are Philippine Standard Time (UTC+8:00).

=== North Division semifinals ===
==== (1) San Juan Knights vs. (5) Caloocan Batang Kankaloo ====
MPTV

October 26
8:00 pm

Boxscore

San Juan Knights	71–65	Caloocan Batang Kankaloo
Scoring by quarter: 13–14, 18–16, 13–16, 27–19
Pts: Michael Calisaan 17; Rebs: Dexter Maiquez 14; Asts: Orlan Wamar Jr. 4		Pts: Joshua Flores 18; Rebs: Gabby Espinas 10; Asts: Irven Palencia, Marion Magat 5
San Juan leads series, 1–0

Filoil EcoOil Centre, San Juan

MPTV

October 30
6:00 pm

Boxscore

Caloocan Batang Kankaloo	80–86	San Juan Knights
Scoring by quarter: 19–24, 13–22, 19–15, 21–25
Pts: Jeramer Cabanag 17; Rebs: Gabby Espinas 7 Asts: Irven Palencia 5		Pts: Orlan Wamar Jr. 15; Rebs: Dexter Maiquez 9 Asts: Orlan Wamar Jr. 6
San Juan wins series, 2–0

Bren Z. Guiao Convention Center, San Fernando, Pampanga

Head-to-head matchup

MPTV

September 27
8:00 pm

Boxscore

San Juan Knights	78–79	Caloocan Batang Kankaloo
Scoring by quarter: 17–23, 19–21, 19–18, 23–17
Pts: Orlan Wamar Jr. 22; Rebs: Dexter Maiquez 12; Asts: Orlan Wamar Jr. 5		Pts: Joco Tayongtong 18; Rebs: Ronnie Matias 8 Asts: Gabby Espinas 4

Caloocan Sports Complex, Caloocan

This is the first playoff meeting between San Juan and Caloocan.

==== (2) Pampanga Giant Lanterns vs. (3) Nueva Ecija Rice Vanguards ====
MPTV

October 26
6:00 pm

Boxscore

Nueva Ecija Rice Vanguards	73–76	Pampanga Giant Lanterns
Scoring by quarter: 13–16, 23–18, 16–27, 21–15
Pts: Robby Celiz 21; Rebs: John Bryle Bahio 10; Asts: MJ Ayaay, Robby Celiz 4		Pts: Encho Serrano 19; Rebs: Justine Baltazar 26; Asts: Justine Baltazar 7
Pampanga leads series, 1–0

Filoil EcoOil Centre, San Juan

MPTV

October 30
8:00 pm

Boxscore

Pampanga Giant Lanterns	83–80 (OT)	Nueva Ecija Rice Vanguards
Scoring by quarter: 19–19, 14–16, 26–20, 11–15, Overtime: 13–10
Pts: Encho Serrano 23; Rebs: Justine Baltazar 25; Asts: three players 4		Pts: Will McAloney 13; Rebs: John Bryle Bahio 15; Asts: JC Cullar 8
Pampanga wins series, 2–0

Bren Z. Guiao Convention Center, San Fernando, Pampanga

Head-to-head matchup

MPTV

June 29
8:00 pm

Boxscore

Pampanga Giant Lanterns	91–85	Nueva Ecija Rice Vanguards
Scoring by quarter: 29–16, 12–30, 26–21, 24–18
Pts: Archie Concepcion 20; Rebs: Justine Baltazar 17; Asts: Kurt Reyson 7		Pts: Will McAloney 23; Rebs: Robby Celiz 8 Asts: JC Cullar 8

Nueva Ecija Coliseum, Palayan, Nueva Ecija

This is the second playoff meeting between Pampanga and Nueva Ecija with Nueva Ecija winning the previous meeting.

Previous playoffs series
Nueva Ecija leads 1–0 in all-time playoff series

2022

Nueva Ecija Rice Vanguards 2, Pampanga Giant Lanterns 0

2022 North Division semifinals

=== South Division semifinals ===
==== (1) Quezon Huskers vs. (5) Parañaque Patriots ====
MPTV

October 28
7:30 pm

Boxscore

Quezon Huskers	75–62	Parañaque Patriots
Scoring by quarter: 24–17, 14–14, 12–17, 25–14
Pts: Gab Banal, Ximone Sandagon 16; Rebs: Gab Banal 9 Asts: Christopher Lagrama 5		Pts: John Uduba 14; Rebs: John Uduba, Jielo Razon 8 Asts: Philip Manalang 8
Quezon leads series, 1–0

Quezon Convention Center, Lucena

MPTV

November 4
6:00 pm

Boxscore

Parañaque Patriots	69–76	Quezon Huskers
Scoring by quarter: 15–18, 19–22, 19–23, 16–13
Pts: JP Sarao 26; Rebs: John Uduba, Philip Manalang 10; Asts: Philip Manalang 6		Pts: Judel Fuentes 27; Rebs: LJ Gonzales 8 Asts: LJ Gonzales 7
Quezon wins series, 2–0

Batangas City Coliseum, Batangas City, Batangas

Head-to-head matchup

MPTV

May 16
8:00 pm

Boxscore

Quezon Huskers	81–75	Parañaque Patriots
Scoring by quarter: 16–14, 25–19, 19–28, 21–14
Pts: Christopher Lagrama 16; Rebs: Will Gozum 10; Asts: LJ Gonzales 5		Pts: Jielo Razon 19; Rebs: John Uduba 10; Asts: Jielo Razon 6

Olivarez College Gymnasium, Parañaque

This is the first playoff meeting between Quezon and Parañaque.

==== (2) Batangas City Tanduay Rum Masters vs. (6) South Cotabato Warriors ====
MPTV

October 28
5:30 pm

Boxscore

South Cotabato Warriors	87–76	Batangas City Tanduay Rum Masters
Scoring by quarter: 18–20, 27–15, 27–27, 15–14
Pts: Christian Fajarito 20; Rebs: Jammer Jamito 11; Asts: Mark Cruz 5		Pts: Levi Hernandez 16; Rebs: Dawn Ochea 7 Asts: Philip Paniamogan 7
South Cotabato leads series, 1–0

Quezon Convention Center, Lucena

MPTV

November 4
8:00 pm

Boxscore

Batangas City Tanduay Rum Masters	81–79	South Cotabato Warriors
Scoring by quarter: 23–21, 15–18, 29–12, 14–28
Pts: Levi Hernandez 15; Rebs: Levi Hernandez, Dawn Ochea 7 Asts: Cedric Ablaza 5		Pts: Nico Elorde 13; Rebs: Jammer Jamito 9 Asts: Marwin Dionisio, Nico Elorde 4
Series tied, 1–1

Batangas City Coliseum, Batangas City, Batangas

MPTV

November 7
7:00 pm

Boxscore

South Cotabato Warriors	63–73	Batangas City Tanduay Rum Masters
Scoring by quarter: 23–9, 17–21, 11–23, 12–20
Pts: Christian Fajarito 12; Rebs: Christian Fajarito 11; Asts: four players 3		Pts: John Ambulodto 18; Rebs: John Ambulodto, Cedric Ablaza 7 Asts: Jeckster Apinan, Carlos Isit 4
Batangas City wins series, 2–1

Batangas City Coliseum, Batangas City, Batangas

Head-to-head matchup

MPTV

August 21
8:00 pm

Boxscore

South Cotabato Warriors	82–91	Batangas City Tanduay Rum Masters
Scoring by quarter: 20–24, 16–22, 23–23, 23–22
Pts: Val Acuña 20; Rebs: Jammer Jamito, JP Calvo 7 Asts: Mark Cruz, Nico Elorde 6		Pts: Juneric Baloria 21; Rebs: Jeckster Apinan 10; Asts: Juneric Baloria 6

Batangas City Coliseum, Batangas City, Batangas

This is the second playoff meeting between Batangas City and South Cotabato with Batangas City winning the previous meeting.

Previous playoffs series
Batangas City leads 1–0 in all-time playoff series

2023

Batangas City Embassy Chill 2, GenSan Warriors 1

2023 South Division semifinals

== Division finals ==
NOTE: All times are Philippine Standard Time (UTC+8:00).

=== North Division finals: (1) San Juan Knights vs. (2) Pampanga Giant Lanterns ===
MPTV

November 8
7:00 pm

Boxscore

San Juan Knights	84–91	Pampanga Giant Lanterns
Scoring by quarter: 18–21, 20–17, 17–26, 29–27
Pts: Reynel Hugnatan 19; Rebs: Agem Miranda 9 Asts: Orlan Wamar Jr. 9		Pts: Encho Serrano 22; Rebs: Justine Baltazar 21; Asts: Justine Baltazar 7
Pampanga leads series, 1–0

Filoil EcoOil Centre, San Juan

MPTV

November 11
7:00 pm

Boxscore

Pampanga Giant Lanterns	81–73	San Juan Knights
Scoring by quarter: 20–21, 12–18, 28–20, 21–14
Pts: Justine Baltazar 24; Rebs: Justine Baltazar 18; Asts: MJ Garcia 6		Pts: Orlan Wamar Jr. 30; Rebs: Mike Malonzo 8 Asts: Orlan Wamar Jr. 5
Pampanga wins series, 2–0

Bren Z. Guiao Convention Center, San Fernando, Pampanga

Head-to-head matchup

MPTV

August 30
6:00 pm

Boxscore

San Juan Knights	86–82	Pampanga Giant Lanterns
Scoring by quarter: 26–20, 17–17, 22–26, 21–19
Pts: Orlan Wamar Jr. 22; Rebs: Dexter Maiquez 8 Asts: Orlan Wamar Jr. 10		Pts: Encho Serrano 23; Rebs: Justine Baltazar 17; Asts: Justine Baltazar 4

Cuneta Astrodome, Pasay

This is the third playoff meeting between San Juan and Pampanga with Pampanga winning the previous meeting.

Previous playoffs series
San Juan and Pampanga tied 1–1 in all-time playoff series

2020

San Juan Knights 2, Pampanga Giant Lanterns 0

2020 North Division semifinals

2023

Pampanga Giant Lanterns 2, San Juan Knights 0

2023 North Division finals

=== South Division finals: (1) Quezon Huskers vs. (2) Batangas City Tanduay Rum Masters ===
MPTV

November 9
7:00 pm

Boxscore

Quezon Huskers	69–75	Batangas City Tanduay Rum Masters
Scoring by quarter: 18–18, 18–18, 16–18, 17–21
Pts: Mon Abundo 15; Rebs: Jason Opiso 10; Asts: Gab Banal 4		Pts: Carlos Isit 17; Rebs: Dawn Ochea 11; Asts: Cedric Ablaza 6
Batangas City leads series, 1–0

Lucena City Convention Center, Lucena

MPTV

November 12
7:00 pm

Boxscore

Batangas City Tanduay Rum Masters	64–65	Quezon Huskers
Scoring by quarter: 20–18, 14–16, 15–11, 15–20
Pts: Levi Hernandez 18; Rebs: John Ambulodto 11; Asts: MJ dela Virgen 7		Pts: LJ Gonzales 17; Rebs: Ximone Sandagon 14; Asts: Christopher Lagrama 4
Series tied, 1–1

Batangas City Coliseum, Batangas City, Batangas

MPTV

November 14
7:00 pm

Boxscore

Quezon Huskers	65–60	Batangas City Tanduay Rum Masters
Scoring by quarter: 19–15, 11–19, 17–14, 18–12
Pts: LJ Gonzales 22; Rebs: LJ Gonzales 8 Asts: Gab Banal, Mon Abundo 3		Pts: Cedric Ablaza 16; Rebs: Jeckster Apinan 9 Asts: Jeckster Apinan 4
Quezon wins series, 2–1

Quezon Convention Center, Lucena

Head-to-head matchup

MPTV

May 25
6:00 pm

Boxscore

Batangas City Tanduay Rum Masters	89–91 (OT)	Quezon Huskers
Scoring by quarter: 18–18, 21–14, 15–18, 19–23, Overtime: 16–18
Pts: Cedric Ablaza 20; Rebs: Cedric Ablaza 10; Asts: Carlos Isit, MJ dela Virgen 7		Pts: Gab Banal 20; Rebs: Gab Banal 8 Asts: Gab Banal 6

Quezon Convention Center, Lucena

This is the first playoff meeting between Quezon and Batangas City.

== MPBL finals: (N2) Pampanga Giant Lanterns vs. (S1) Quezon Huskers ==
NOTE: All times are Philippine Standard Time (UTC+8:00). Games in the UAE are also listed in Gulf Standard Time (UTC+4:00).

MPTV

December 1
11:00 p.m. (7:00 p.m. GST)

Boxscore

Pampanga Giant Lanterns	88–71	Quezon Huskers
Scoring by quarter: 24–20, 23–15, 23–23, 18–13
Pts: Justine Baltazar 24; Rebs: Justine Baltazar 16; Asts: Michael John Garcia 8		Pts: Rodel Gravera 20; Rebs: Christian Buñag, Judel Ric Fuentes 6 Asts: Mon Abundo 7
Pampanga leads series, 1–0

Rashid Bin Hamdan Indoor Hall, Dubai
Referees: A. Manzano, C. Pingul Jr., M. Binay

MPTV

December 3
11:00 p.m. (7:00 p.m. GST)

Boxscore

Quezon Huskers	60–79	Pampanga Giant Lanterns
Scoring by quarter: 18–22, 14–25, 10–16, 18–16
Pts: Judel Ric Fuentes 12; Rebs: Rodel Gravera 11; Asts: Mon Abundo 4		Pts: Kurt Reyson 20; Rebs: Justine Baltazar 19; Asts: Kurt Reyson 7
Pampanga leads series, 2–0

Rashid Bin Hamdan Indoor Hall, Dubai

MPTV

December 7
7:00 p.m.

Boxscore

Pampanga Giant Lanterns	65–61	Quezon Huskers
Scoring by quarter: 12–8, 18–19, 16–20, 19–14
Pts: Justine Baltazar, Archie Concepcion 19; Rebs: Justine Baltazar 19; Asts: Michael John Garcia 5		Pts: Judel Ric Fuentes 21; Rebs: RJ Minerva 8 Asts: Ximone Sandagon, Alfrancis Tamsi 2
Pampanga wins series, 3–0

Bren Z. Guiao Convention Center, San Fernando, Pampanga

This is the first championship meeting between Pampanga and Quezon.

=== Head-to-head matchup ===
MPTV

September 14
08:00 pm

Boxscore

Pampanga Giant Lanterns	75–69	Quezon Huskers
Scoring by quarter: 21–14, 20–19, 18–24, 16–12
Pts: Archie Concepcion 30; Rebs: Justine Baltazar 17; Asts: Justine Baltazar, Kurt Reyson 3		Pts: LJ Gonzales 13; Rebs: LJ Gonzales 8 Asts: Niño Ibañez 6

AUF Sports and Cultural Center, Angeles City
