= 2024 MPBL season =

6th season of the Maharlika Pilipinas Basketball League

- League: Maharlika Pilipinas Basketball League
- Sport: Basketball
- Duration: Regular season: April 6 – October 1, 2024; Playoffs: October 5 – November 14, 2024; Finals: December 1 – 7, 2024
- Games: 406 (regular season)
- Teams: 29
- TV partner(s): Cignal TV (One PH, MPTV, Pilipinas Live)
- Streaming partner(s): Pilipinas Live; Facebook, YouTube

Regular season
- Top seed: San Juan Knights
- Season MVP: Justine Baltazar (Pampanga)

Playoffs
- North Division champions: Pampanga Giant Lanterns
- North Division runners-up: San Juan Knights
- South Division champions: Quezon Huskers
- South Division runners-up: Batangas City Tanduay Rum Masters

Finals
- Champions: Pampanga Giant Lanterns
- Runners-up: Quezon Huskers
- Finals MVP: Justine Baltazar (Pampanga)

MPBL seasons
- ← 2023 2025 →

The 2024 MPBL season was the sixth season of the Maharlika Pilipinas Basketball League (MPBL) and its third under professional status. The regular season began on April 6, 2024 with the opening ceremonies at the Calasiao Sports Complex in Calasiao, Pangasinan, and ended on October 1. The 2024 MPBL All-Star Game was held at the Mayor Vitaliano D. Agan Coliseum in Zamboanga City on September 7. The playoffs began on October 5 and ended on December 7 with the 2024 MPBL finals between the Pampanga Giant Lanterns and Quezon Huskers.

This season featured 29 teams, with two expansion teams making their debut: the Abra Weavers and the Pangasinan Heatwaves.

== Team changes ==
=== Expansion and contraction ===
The MPBL introduced two new expansion teams this season, both based in Northern Luzon: the Abra Weavers and the Pangasinan Heatwaves. Abra became the first team based in the Cordillera Administrative Region while Pangasinan became the first in the Ilocos Region. This season would have seen a third expansion team, the Tarlac United Force, however the league pulled the team out after failing to comply with the league's financial obligations.

The Davao Occidental Tigers made their return to the league after a two-season absence, during which they competed in the Pilipinas Super League. On the other hand, the Makati OKBet Kings, Pasig City MCW Sports, and the reigning South Division champion Bacoor City Strikers all departed after four seasons in the league.

The two expansion teams (Abra and Pangasinan) were all placed in the North Division. Davao Occidental was placed back into the South Division together with the Parañaque Patriots. Due to Tarlac's withdrawal, the league remains at 29 teams, with the North Division having 14 teams and the South having 15.

=== Name changes ===
2023 team name	2024 team name(s)
Batangas City Embassy Chill	Batangas City Athletics (Invitational only) Batangas City Tanduay Rum Masters
Bicol Volcanoes	Bicolandia Oragons
GenSan Warriors	South Cotabato Warriors
Imus SV Squad	Imus Agimat
Laguna Krah Asia	Biñan Tatak Gel
Manila Stars	Manila Batang Sampaloc
Mindoro Disiplinados	Mindoro Tamaraws
Valenzuela XUR Homes Realty Inc.	Valenzuela Classic
Zamboanga Family's Brand Sardines	Zamboanga Master Sardines

=== Regulation changes ===
Beginning with this season, the league has removed the ex-PBA player limit from its roster regulations, allowing teams to sign any number of fully professional players. The league was affected by the National Collegiate Athletic Association's (NCAA) decision to no longer allow its Special Guest Licensees to play in professional leagues, which came into effect on June 1, 2024.

== Transactions ==
=== Coaching changes ===
Offseason
Team	Departing coach	Incoming coach
Abra Weavers	—N/a	Jonathan Banal
Bacolod City of Smiles	Vincent Salvador	Alex Cabagnot
Bataan Risers	Alex Callueng	Rene Baena
Bicolandia Oragons	Jason Santiago	Raymond Valenzona
Biñan Tatak Gel	Nath Gregorio	Boyet Fernandez
Bulacan Kuyas	Joseph Mabagos	Jonathan Reyes
Caloocan Batang Kankaloo	Robert Sison	Alexander Angeles
Imus Agimat	Jinino Manansala	Jun Da Jose
Manila Batang Sampaloc	Bimbot Anquilo	Gabby Severino
Marikina Shoemasters	Elvis Tolentino	Rysal Castro
Mindoro Tamaraws	Jonathan Reyes	JR Cawaling
Muntinlupa Cagers	Aldrin Morante	Mixson Ramos
Nueva Ecija Rice Vanguards	Jerson Cabiltes	Don Dulay
Pampanga Giant Lanterns	Dennis Pineda	Frederick Dimatulac
Pangasinan Heatwaves	—N/a	Jerson Cabiltes
Rizal Golden Coolers	Jonathan Banal	Ralph Rivera
South Cotabato Warriors	Rich Alvarez	Elvis Tolentino

In season
Team	Departing coach	Incoming coach
Abra Weavers	Jonathan Banal	Yong Garcia
Bacolod City of Smiles	Alex Cabagnot	RJ Argamino
Bataan Risers	Rene Baena	Goody Ilagan
Imus Agimat	Jun Da Jose	Eric Sy
Iloilo United Royals	MC Abolucion	Japs Cuan
Manila Batang Sampaloc	Gabby Severino	Ariel Vanguardia

== Playing venues ==
New venues for this season are indicated with bold text.

=== Regular venues ===
Abra Weavers	Bataan Risers		Batangas City Tanduay Rum Masters	
University of Abra (Gov. Andres B. Bernos Memorial Gymnasium); Bangued, Abra	Bataan People's Center; Balanga, Bataan	Orion Sports Complex; Orion, Bataan	Batangas City Coliseum; Batangas City, Batangas	FPJ Arena; San Jose, Batangas
Capacity: 2,000	Capacity: 4,000	Capacity: 2,000	Capacity: 4,000	Capacity: 3,000

Biñan Tatak Gel	Caloocan Batang Kankaloo	Manila Batang Sampaloc		Mindoro Tamaraws
Alonte Sports Arena; Biñan, Laguna	Caloocan Sports Complex; Caloocan	Paco Arena; Manila	San Andres Sports Complex; Manila	Pola Gymnasium; Pola, Oriental Mindoro
Capacity: 6,500	Capacity: 3,000	Capacity: 1,000	Capacity: 3,000	Capacity: N/A

Nueva Ecija Rice Vanguards	Pampanga Giant Lanterns		Pangasinan Heatwaves	Parañaque Patriots
Nueva Ecija Coliseum; Palayan, Nueva Ecija	AUF Sports and Cultural Center; Angeles City	Bren Z. Guiao Convention Center; San Fernando, Pampanga	Calasiao Sports Complex; Calasiao, Pangasinan	Olivarez College (Olivarez College Gymnasium); Parañaque
Capacity: 3,000	Capacity: 2,000	Capacity: 3,000	Capacity: 3,000	Capacity: 3,500

Parañaque Patriots	Pasay Voyagers	Quezon Huskers		Quezon City Toda Aksyon
Villar Coliseum; Las Piñas	Cuneta Astrodome; Pasay	Lucena Convention Center; Lucena	Quezon Convention Center; Lucena	Amoranto Arena; Quezon City
Capacity: 4,000	Capacity: 12,000	Capacity: 4,000	Capacity: 7,000	Capacity: 3,500

Rizal Golden Coolers	San Juan Knights	Valenzuela Classic	Zamboanga Master Sardines
Ynares Center; Antipolo, Rizal	Filoil EcoOil Centre; San Juan	WES Arena; Valenzuela	Mayor Vitaliano D. Agan Coliseum; Zamboanga City
Capacity: 7,400	Capacity: 6,000	Capacity: 2,000	Capacity: 10,000

=== Other venues ===
Preseason Invitational	MPBL finals	Neutral venues	
Lagao Gymnasium; General Santos	(United Arab Emirates) Rashid Bin Hamdan Indoor Hall; Dubai	Strike Gymnasium; Bacoor, Cavite	Ynares Sports Arena; Pasig
Capacity: 6,000	Capacity: N/A	Capacity: 1,500	Capacity: 3,000

== Preseason ==
The Preseason Invitational ran from February 21 to 27, 2024. Similar to the previous edition, the tournament featured eight teams and took place at the Lagao Gymnasium in General Santos, in line with the city's Kalilangan Festival. Pampanga Giant Lanterns were crowned tournament champions after defeating South Cotabato Warriors in the final game, 93–75.

== Regular season ==
=== Opening ceremony ===
Originally scheduled for March 16, 2024, this season's opening gameday was postponed twice. First by a week to March 23 and the second by another two weeks to April 6, the latter being due in part to the observance of Holy Week in the country during the week after March 23.

The opening ceremony took place at the Calasiao Sports Complex in Calasiao, Pangasinan. Singer and Calasiao native Mitoy Yonting is one of the performers to kick off the season. The team and muse showcase then followed, with Barbie Imperial, representing the Abra Weavers, winning the Best Muse award.

The first game saw the Zamboanga Master Sardines beat the Valenzuela Classic in overtime, while the second saw the host Pangasinan Heatwaves fall to the Abra Weavers in a clash of the league's two Northern Luzon expansion teams.

=== Format ===
Similar to previous seasons, all participating teams play in a single round-robin tournament for the regular season, playing one game against every other team. This season, each of the 29 teams is expected to play 28 games. In each gameday, a series of games is played in a designated home arena, with the home team usually playing in the final game. The top eight teams in each division will advance to the 2024 MPBL playoffs.

=== Standings ===
North Division

Pos	Team	Pld	W	L	GB
1	San Juan Knights	28	26 (Note: San Juan wins tiebreaker over Pampanga based on head-to-head record.)	2	—
2	Pampanga Giant Lanterns	28	26	2	—
3	Nueva Ecija Rice Vanguards	28	24	4	2
4	Manila SV Batang Sampaloc	28	20	8	6
5	Caloocan Batang Kankaloo	28	19	9	7
6	Pasay Voyagers	28	18 (Note: Pasay wins tiebreaker over Abra based on head-to-head record.)	10	8
7	Abra Weavers	28	18	10	8
8	Rizal Golden Coolers	28	15 (Note: Rizal wins tiebreaker over Quezon City based on head-to-head record.)	13	11
9	Quezon City Toda Aksyon	28	15	13	11
10	Valenzuela Classic	28	14	14	12
11	Pangasinan Heatwaves	28	12	16	14
12	Bataan Risers	28	9	19	17
13	Marikina Shoemasters	28	7	21	19
14	Bulacan Kuyas	28	2	26	24
WD	Tarlac United Force (Note: The Tarlac United Force was pulled out by the league due to the team's failure to comply with financial obligations.)	0	0	0	12

Source: Standings
Rules for classification: 1) Wins; 2a) If two teams are tied, head-to-head match-up; 2b) If three or more teams are tied, head-to-head point quotient; 3) overall point quotient; 4) coin toss.
Notes:

South Division

Pos	Team	Pld	W	L	GB
1	Quezon Huskers	28	21	7	—
2	Batangas City Tanduay Rum Masters	28	20 (Note: Batangas City (1.132), Biñan (0.950), and Zamboanga (0.931) are ranked based on head-to-head point quotient.)	8	1
3	Biñan Tatak Gel	28	20	8	1
4	Zamboanga Master Sardines	28	20	8	1
5	Parañaque Patriots	28	17 (Note: Parañaque wins tiebreaker over South Cotabato based on head-to-head record.)	11	4
6	South Cotabato Warriors	28	17	11	4
7	Davao Occidental Tigers	28	15	13	6
8	Negros Muscovados	28	12	16	9
9	Iloilo United Royals	28	11	17	10
10	Mindoro Tamaraws	28	10	18	11
11	Muntinlupa Cagers	28	7	21	14
12	Sarangani Marlins	28	5	23	16
13	Bicolandia Oragons	28	3	25	18
14	Imus Agimat	28	2	26	19
15	Bacolod City of Smiles	28	1	27	20

Source: Standings
Rules for classification: 1) Wins; 2a) If two teams are tied, head-to-head match-up; 2b) If three or more teams are tied, head-to-head point quotient; 3) overall point quotient; 4) coin toss.

==== Results table ====
Team	Game																											
Team	1	2	3	4	5	6	7	8	9	10	11	12	13	14	15	16	17	18	19	20	21	22	23	24	25	26	27	28
Abra (ABR)	PGS ^{(A)} 83–75	MAR; 97–85	PSY ^{(A)} 72–78	BIÑ ^{(A)} 60–65	NEG; 69–57	CAL ^{(A)} 59–63	SJ ^{(A)} 82–95	MDR; 76–80*	MNL; 94–68	IMS; 94–57	BCD; 115–64	SAR; 82–60	RZL ^{(H)} 74–63	DVO; 74–92	BTG; 84–70	BUL; 89–57	QZN; 85–90	SOC; 73–64	ILO ^{(H)} 77–55	QC; 78–70	MUN; 88–59	VAL ^{(H)} 84–52	ZAM; 68–76*	PAM; 79–88	NE; 78–81	BAN; 93–74	BCL; 129–68	PAR ^{(A)} 84–80
Bacolod (BCD)	ILO; 67–85	BAN; 74–86	SAR; 84–81	DVO; 71–72	CAL; 73–80	MAR; 73–82	QZN; 55–76	ZAM; 62–77	NE; 77–95	BUL; 82–94	ABR; 64–115	MUN; 74–80	BCL; 61–62	PGS; 70–84	SJ; 85–91	VAL; 81–88	PSY; 67–77	SOC; 84–90	NEG; 92–96	BTG; 54–79	BIÑ ^{(A)} 77–87	RZL; 79–90	QC; 77–120	MDR; 103–114	PAM; 94–143	PAR; 82–111	MNL ^{(A)} 76–123	IMS; 127–130
Bataan (BAN)	SAR ^{(H)} 90–80	BCD; 86–74	MNL ^{(A)} 84–90	VAL; 87–91	BUL; 92–90	DVO ^{(H)} 89–90*	PAM ^{(A)} 75–86	MUN; 63–69	RZL; 85–87	BTG; 69–73	ZAM ^{(H)} 72–79	IMS; 93–61	MAR; 72–80	NE; 70–85	PSY; 78–82	SOC; 83–88	BIÑ ^{(A)} 68–79	PAR ^{(H)} 58–74	MDR; 103–96	SJ ^{(H)} 81–97	CAL ^{(A)} 52–60	BCL; 108–91	PGS ^{(H)} 102–88	QZN; 85–82	NEG ^{(H)} 84–62	QC; 60–76	ILO; 100–104	ABR; 74–93
Batangas City (BTG)	BUL; 76–68	ILO ^{(H)} 71–64	IMS; 108–79	PSY; 64–65	RZL ^{(H)} 70–63	NEG; 72–62	DVO ^{(H)} 71–59	QC; 76–73*	QZN ^{(A)} 89–91*	BAN; 73–69	MDR; 82–73	BIÑ ^{(H)} 79–72	CAL; 72–73	VAL ^{(H)} 91–74	ABR; 70–84	BCL; 107–94	SJ ^{(H)} 69–83	PAM ^{(A)} 62–88	PGS ^{(A)} 71–64	BCD; 79–54	MNL ^{(A)} 76–86	ZAM; 93–80	PAR ^{(H)} 80–72	SOC ^{(H)} 91–82	NE; 58–68	MAR ^{(H)} 92–77	MUN; 73–63	SAR; 112–87
Bicolandia (BCL)	MDR; 81–84	ZAM; 82–97	NEG; 68–75	RZL; 82–85	PAM; 93–128	NE; 65–76	ILO; 73–75	SJ; 58–99	CAL; 86–98	SOC; 68–82	MUN; 55–60	QZN; 86–115	BCD; 62–61	IMS; 107–104	SAR; 55–101	PAR; 90–110	BTG; 94–107	MAR; 93–120	PGS; 91–113	DVO; 107–123	BUL; 73–72	BAN; 91–108	MNL; 86–128	BIÑ; 56–75	PSY; 106–122	VAL; 54–98	ABR; 68–129	QC; 88–108
Biñan (BIÑ)	ABR ^{(H)} 65–60	QC ^{(H)} 72–53	IMS; 84–67	VAL; 88–77	MUN; 71–60	PGS ^{(A)} 75–72	MNL ^{(H)} 63–79	PSY; 65–76	SOC ^{(H)} 81–82	BTG ^{(A)} 72–79	BUL ^{(H)} 81–61	PAR ^{(A)} 71–65	SJ ^{(A)} 85–96	QZN ^{(H)} 54–58	BAN ^{(H)} 79–68	PAM ^{(H)} 74–91	RZL; 82–80	NEG; 91–72	ZAM ^{(H)} 81–82	BCD ^{(H)} 87–77	CAL; 73–61	NE ^{(H)} 99–82	SAR; 77–61	DVO ^{(H)} 75–66	BCL; 75–56	ILO ^{(H)} 97–67	MAR; 97–59	MDR ^{(H)} 82–59
Bulacan (BUL)	BTG; 68–76	MNL; 70–75	PGS; 55–87	SAR; 92–88	BAN; 90–92	PAR ^{(A)} 73–79	SOC; 82–85	DVO; 55–91	NE; 66–105	VAL ^{(A)} 70–98	BCD; 94–82	PSY; 69–90	MAR; 91–95	BIÑ ^{(A)} 61–81	PAM; 81–124	ILO; 67–92	ABR; 57–89	IMS; 88–94	RZL; 63–85	MUN; 60–64	QC ^{(A)} 65–87	BCL; 72–73	NEG; 64–83	QZN; 51–79	ZAM; 63–103	MDR; 69–75	SJ; 87–114	CAL; 71–91
Caloocan (CAL)	MNL ^{(A)} 66–69	BCD; 80–73	ABR ^{(H)} 63–59	PGS ^{(H)} 66–65	MAR; 64–38	BCL; 98–86	ZAM ^{(H)} 65–72	MDR; 90–76	PAR ^{(H)} 69–73	QZN ^{(H)} 56–66	BTG; 73–72	SOC ^{(H)} 71–80	DVO ^{(H)} 79–76*	PAM ^{(H)} 60–76	VAL ^{(H)} 84–78	ILO; 90–80	NE; 66–86	BAN ^{(H)} 60–52	BIÑ; 61–73	PSY; 77–71	RZL ^{(H)} 77–53	IMS; 138–94	QC; 72–77	NEG ^{(H)} 93–85	BUL; 91–71	MUN; 93–78	SJ ^{(H)} 79–78	SAR; 78–52
Davao Occidental (DVO)	PSY ^{(A)} 56–57	BCD; 72–71	IMS; 132–68	MUN; 82–66	BAN ^{(A)} 90–89*	BUL; 91–55	BTG ^{(A)} 59–71	RZL; 79–59	PGS; 64–62	VAL ^{(A)} 79–65	ILO; 78–85	PAM ^{(A)} 47–81	NEG; 67–64	ABR; 92–74	CAL ^{(A)} 76–79*	PAR ^{(A)} 75–73	MNL ^{(A)} 92–82	MDR; 82–59	SJ ^{(A)} 65–87	BCL; 123–107	MAR; 90–76	SAR; 61–67	NE; 57–65	ZAM; 65–67	BIÑ ^{(A)} 66–75	QZN ^{(A)} 85–92*	SOC; 74–84	QC; 63–65
Iloilo (ILO)	BCD; 85–67	BTG ^{(A)} 64–71	PAR; 66–72	SJ ^{(A)} 78–106	MDR; 70–77	BCL; 75–73	PSY ^{(A)} 77–81	NEG; 66–72	QC; 71–74	IMS; 95–82	DVO; 85–78	SOC; 89–83	MNL; 74–98	QZN; 61–71	BUL; 92–67	MAR; 93–77	ZAM; 68–81	NE; 73–78	CAL; 80–90	ABR ^{(A)} 55–77	MUN; 63–58	PAM ^{(A)} 49–88	RZL; 68–70	PGS; 78–100	BIÑ ^{(A)} 67–97	BAN; 104–100	VAL ^{(A)} 72–69	SAR; 72–69
Imus (IMS)	SOC; 65–105	QC; 70–91	BTG; 79–108	DVO; 68–132	BIÑ; 67–84	NE; 74–105	VAL; 88–107	SAR; 101–106	QZN; 73–100	ABR; 57–94	ILO; 82–95	BAN; 61–93	MNL; 58–96	BCL; 104–107	ZAM; 71–110	NEG; 68–75	MDR ^{(A)} 68–82	BUL; 94–88	MAR; 79–96	MUN; 63–76	PAM; 75–136	SJ; 61–100	PSY; 59–87	CAL; 94–138	RZL; 92–103	PGS; 83–112	PAR; 89–111	BCD; 130–127
Manila (MNL)	PAR ^{(A)} 78–82	BUL; 75–70	BAN ^{(H)} 90–84	CAL ^{(H)} 69–66	QZN ^{(H)} 65–70	SAR; 90–87	NE ^{(A)} 62–78	VAL ^{(H)} 90–76	ABR; 68–94	BIÑ ^{(A)} 79–63	RZL; 75–67	QC; 76–57	IMS; 96–58	ILO; 98–74	PSY; 90–87	SOC ^{(H)} 85–80	MUN; 83–80	DVO ^{(H)} 82–92	MAR; 91–76	BTG ^{(H)} 86–76	MDR; 77–78	NEG; 93–68	SJ ^{(A)} 78–80	BCL; 128–86	PAM; 63–92	BCD ^{(H)} 123–76	ZAM; 86–78	PGS ^{(H)} 82–77
Marikina (MAR)	NEG; 62–73	ABR; 85–97	PAM; 85–86	SJ; 73–101	PGS ^{(A)} 68–80	BCD; 82–73	ZAM; 54–78	CAL; 38–64	SOC; 72–76	SAR; 67–70	NE; 64–88	BUL; 95–91	BAN; 80–72	MUN; 56–67	QC; 88–84*	ILO; 77–93	BCL; 120–93	IMS; 96–79	MNL; 76–91	DVO; 76–90	MDR; 76–72	PAR; 78–88	PSY; 64–83	BTG ^{(A)} 77–92	BIÑ; 59–97	QZN; 66–78	VAL; 66–71	RZL; 73–88
Mindoro (MDR)	BCL; 84–81	SAR; 93–99	ZAM; 72–86	PAM; 72–96	NE; 68–79	ILO; 77–70	QC; 71–78	ABR; 80–76*	SJ; 65–95	PSY; 96–88	CAL; 76–90	BTG; 73–82	PGS; 62–81	SOC; 91–107	NEG; 64–68	RZL; 60–64	IMS ^{(H)} 82–68	PAR; 94–97	DVO; 59–82	BAN; 96–103	QZN; 66–61	MNL; 78–77	MAR; 72–76	BCD; 114–103	MUN; 79–76	BUL; 75–69	VAL; 63–64	BIÑ ^{(A)} 59–82
Muntinlupa (MUN)	QC; 74–81	RZL ^{(A)} 61–79	SOC; 62–103	PAR ^{(A)} 57–64	DVO; 66–82	PAM ^{(A)} 62–83	BIÑ; 60–71	BAN; 69–63	SAR; 75–71	NE; 57–86	BCL; 60–55	BCD; 80–74	SJ; 70–94	MAR; 67–56	PGS; 84–87	VAL; 71–73	MNL; 80–83	ZAM; 55–75	BUL; 64–60	IMS; 76–63	ILO; 58–63	PSY; 73–80*	ABR; 59–88	NEG; 77–80	MDR; 76–79	QZN; 31–88	BTG; 63–73	CAL; 78–93
Negros (NEG)	MAR; 73–62	PSY; 86–84**	BCL; 75–68	ZAM; 73–88	ABR; 57–69	VAL; 70–74	BTG; 62–72	SOC; 74–81	ILO; 72–66	SJ; 64–85	QZN; 62–73	PAM; 81–104	QC; 79–83	DVO; 64–67	MDR; 68–64	IMS; 75–68	RZL; 103–94	NE; 86–96	BCD; 96–92	PGS; 87–86	BIÑ; 72–91	SAR; 102–94	BUL; 83–64	MNL; 68–93	MUN; 80–77	PAR; 83–110	BAN ^{(A)} 62–84	CAL ^{(A)} 85–93
Nueva Ecija (NE)	QC ^{(H)} 80–74*	MDR; 79–68	BCL; 76–65	IMS; 105–74	MNL ^{(H)} 78–62	BUL; 105–66	BCD; 95–77	MUN; 86–57	MAR; 88–64	ZAM ^{(H)} 83–80	PAR; 90–79	BAN; 85–70	PAM ^{(H)} 85–91	SJ ^{(A)} 66–78	NEG; 96–86	ILO; 78–73	VAL; 93–80	CAL; 86–66	PGS ^{(H)} 99–93	DVO; 65–57	BIÑ ^{(A)} 82–99	BTG; 68–58	QZN ^{(A)} 81–68	SOC; 94–75	SAR; 117–80	ABR; 81–78	RZL; 88–67	PSY; 63–64
Pampanga (PAM)	RZL; 71–78	MAR; 86–85	MDR; 96–72	BCL; 128–93	QC ^{(H)} 63–44	MUN ^{(H)} 83–62	BAN ^{(H)} 86–75	PSY ^{(H)} 70–65	PAR ^{(H)} 77–59	SAR ^{(H)} 109–68	NEG; 104–81	DVO ^{(H)} 81–47	VAL ^{(H)} 85–56	BUL; 124–81	NE ^{(A)} 91–85	PGS ^{(H)} 74–50	CAL ^{(A)} 76–60	BIÑ ^{(A)} 91–74	BTG ^{(H)} 88–62	ZAM; 82–79	IMS; 136–75	SOC; 83–75	ILO ^{(H)} 88–49	MNL; 92–63	SJ; 82–86	BCD; 143–94	ABR; 88–79	QZN ^{(H)} 75–69
Pangasinan (PGS)	ABR ^{(H)} 75–83	VAL ^{(A)} 85–86	BUL; 87–55	QZN; 68–72	MAR ^{(H)} 80–68	SJ; 73–81	CAL ^{(A)} 65–66	BIÑ ^{(H)} 72–75	DVO; 62–64	PAR ^{(H)} 68–60	RZL; 74–76	MDR; 81–62	BCD; 84–70	QC ^{(H)} 74–78	MUN; 87–84	PAM ^{(A)} 50–74	PSY ^{(A)} 75–83	BCL; 113–91	NEG; 86–87	BTG ^{(H)} 64–71	SOC; 52–50	NE ^{(A)} 93–99	ZAM ^{(H)} 75–74	BAN ^{(A)} 88–102	ILO; 100–78	IMS; 112–83	SAR; 88–70	MNL ^{(A)} 77–82
Parañaque (PAR)	MNL ^{(H)} 82–78	SOC; 73–64	ILO; 72–66	MUN ^{(H)} 64–57	VAL ^{(H)} 68–70	BUL ^{(H)} 79–73	SAR; 100–67	QZN ^{(H)} 75–81	ZAM; 65–62	PAM ^{(A)} 59–77	PGS ^{(A)} 60–68	CAL ^{(A)} 73–69	NE; 79–90	BIÑ ^{(H)} 65–71	RZL ^{(H)} 82–73	BCL; 110–90	DVO ^{(H)} 73–75	MDR; 97–94	BAN ^{(A)} 74–58	PSY ^{(A)} 72–78	QC; 74–64	BTG ^{(A)} 72–80	MAR; 88–78	NEG; 110–83	SJ ^{(H)} 68–70	BCD; 111–82	IMS; 111–89	ABR ^{(H)} 80–84
Pasay (PSY)	NEG; 84–86**	ABR ^{(H)} 78–72	DVO ^{(H)} 57–56	BTG; 65–64	SOC; 70–77	RZL ^{(H)} 89–75	ILO ^{(H)} 81–77	PAM ^{(A)} 65–70	MDR; 88–96	BIÑ; 76–65	BUL; 90–69	VAL; 85–86	QC; 60–70	MNL; 87–90	BAN; 82–78	BCD; 77–67	PGS ^{(H)} 83–75	SAR; 65–60	QZN ^{(H)} 84–81	PAR ^{(H)} 78–72	SJ; 70–93	MUN; 80–73*	CAL; 71–77	IMS; 87–59	MAR; 83–64	BCL; 122–106	ZAM ^{(H)} 78–87	NE; 64–63
Quezon (QZN)	VAL; 88–81	PGS; 72–68	MNL ^{(A)} 70–65	ZAM; 82–77*	BCD; 76–55	PAR ^{(A)} 81–75	IMS; 100–73	BTG ^{(H)} 91–89*	NEG; 73–62	BCL; 115–86	CAL ^{(A)} 66–56	SAR; 72–68	ILO; 71–61	BIÑ ^{(A)} 58–54	QC; 70–59	ABR; 90–85	PSY ^{(A)} 81–84	MDR; 61–66	RZL ^{(H)} 83–78	SJ ^{(A)} 59–89	BUL; 79–51	BAN; 82–85	NE ^{(H)} 68–81	MUN; 88–31	DVO ^{(H)} 92–85*	PAM ^{(A)} 69–75	MAR; 78–66	SOC; 86–93
Quezon City (QC)	MUN; 81–74	IMS; 91–70	NE ^{(A)} 74–80*	BIÑ ^{(A)} 53–72	PAM ^{(A)} 44–63	MDR; 78–71	RZL; 59–71	BTG; 73–76*	ILO; 74–71	SOC; 62–65	MNL; 57–76	NEG; 83–79	PSY; 70–60	PGS ^{(A)} 78–74	MAR; 84–88*	SAR; 70–61	QZN; 59–70	SJ ^{(A)} 72–85	ZAM; 85–89	BUL ^{(H)} 87–65	PAR; 64–74	ABR; 70–78	BCD; 120–77	VAL; 73–67	CAL; 77–72	BAN; 76–60	DVO; 65–63	BCL; 108–88
Rizal (RZL)	PAM; 78–71	MUN ^{(H)} 79–61	BCL; 85–82	SOC; 92–81	BTG ^{(A)} 63–70	PSY ^{(A)} 75–89	QC; 71–59	DVO; 59–79	BAN; 87–85	MNL; 67–75	PGS; 76–74	SJ ^{(A)} 104–100***	ABR ^{(A)} 63–74	ZAM; 69–77	PAR ^{(A)} 73–82	MDR; 64–60	NEG; 94–103	BUL; 85–63	BIÑ; 80–82	SAR; 80–69	QZN ^{(A)} 78–83	BCD; 90–79	VAL; 73–76	ILO; 70–68	CAL ^{(A)} 53–77	IMS; 103–92	NE; 67–88	MAR; 88–73
San Juan (SJ)	MAR; 101–73	ILO ^{(H)} 106–78	SAR; 80–65	PGS; 81–73	ABR ^{(H)} 95–82	BCL; 99–58	MDR; 95–65	NEG; 85–64	VAL ^{(H)} 93–81	RZL ^{(H)} 100–104***	MUN; 94–70	BCD; 91–85	BIÑ ^{(H)} 96–85	NE ^{(H)} 78–66	QC ^{(H)} 85–72	BTG ^{(A)} 83–69	DVO ^{(H)} 87–65	BAN ^{(A)} 97–81	PSY; 93–70	QZN ^{(H)} 89–59	IMS; 100–61	MNL ^{(H)} 80–78	SOC ^{(H)} 88–79	PAM; 86–82	PAR ^{(A)} 70–68	BUL; 114–87	ZAM; 77–72	CAL ^{(A)} 78–79
Sarangani (SAR)	BAN ^{(A)} 80–90	MDR; 99–93	BCD; 81–84	BUL; 88–92	SJ; 65–80	MNL; 87–90	PAR; 67–100	IMS; 106–101	MUN; 71–75	MAR; 70–67	PAM ^{(A)} 68–109	ABR; 60–82	ZAM; 73–90	QZN; 68–72	BCL; 101–55	QC; 61–70	VAL; 64–79	PSY; 60–65	RZL; 69–80	NEG; 94–102	DVO; 67–61	SOC; 80–95	BIÑ; 61–77	NE; 80–117	BTG; 87–112	PGS; 70–88	ILO; 69–72	CAL; 52–78
South Cotabato (SOC)	IMS; 105–65	PAR; 64–73	MUN; 103–62	RZL; 81–92	ZAM; 83–85	PSY; 77–70	BUL; 85–82	NEG; 81–74	MAR; 76–72	BCL; 82–68	QC; 65–62	BIÑ ^{(A)} 82–81	ILO; 83–89	MDR; 107–91	CAL ^{(A)} 80–71	MNL ^{(A)} 80–85	BAN; 88–83	BCD; 90–84	ABR; 64–73	PGS; 50–52	VAL; 76–74	PAM; 75–83	SAR; 95–80	BTG ^{(A)} 82–91	SJ ^{(A)} 79–88	NE; 75–94	DVO; 84–74	QZN; 93–86
Valenzuela (VAL)	ZAM; 76–82*	PGS ^{(H)} 86–85	QZN; 81–88	BAN; 91–87	PAR ^{(A)} 70–68	NEG; 74–70	BIÑ; 77–88	IMS; 107–88	MNL ^{(A)} 76–90	BUL ^{(H)} 98–70	DVO ^{(H} 65–79	SJ ^{(A)} 81–93	PSY; 86–85	PAM ^{(A)} 56–85	BTG ^{(A)} 74–91	BCD; 88–81	MUN; 73–71	SAR; 79–64	CAL ^{(A)} 78–84	NE; 80–93	SOC; 74–76	RZL; 76–73	ABR ^{(A)} 52–84	QC; 67–73	MDR; 64–63	BCL; 98–54	ILO ^{(H)} 69–72	MAR; 71–66
Zamboanga (ZAM)	VAL; 82–76*	BCL; 97–82	MDR; 86–72	NEG; 88–73	SOC; 85–83	QZN; 77–82*	MAR; 78–54	BCD; 77–62	PAR; 62–65	CAL ^{(A)} 72–65	BAN ^{(A)} 79–72	NE ^{(A)} 80–83	SAR; 90–73	RZL; 77–69	IMS; 110–71	ILO; 81–68	MUN; 75–55	QC; 89–85	PAM; 79–82	BIÑ ^{(A)} 82–81	BTG; 80–93	PGS ^{(A)} 74–75	DVO; 67–65	BUL; 103–63	ABR; 76–68*	PSY ^{(A)} 87–78	SJ; 72–77	MNL; 78–86

Source: Schedule
Legend: Blue = win; Red = loss; Matches with lighter background shading were decided after overtime. (*) Number of asterisks denotes number of overtime periods

Notes

- Any game details are subject to change.
- Any games that are played home or away are indicated by the superscript after the team's abbreviation (H for home and A for away). Games with no superscript are neutral-site.

Postponed games

- All games scheduled from July 23 to 26 were postponed due to rains brought by Super Typhoon Carina.
  - The games on July 23 at San Andres Sports Complex were rescheduled to September 28 and moved to Olivarez College.
  - The games on July 25 at Caloocan Sports Complex were rescheduled to September 27.
  - The games on July 26 at Olivarez College were rescheduled to September 30.
- All games scheduled on September 2 at Ynares Sports Arena were postponed due to rains brought by Tropical Depression Enteng. They were later rescheduled to October 1 and moved to Paco Arena.
- Any postponed or suspended games will be rescheduled towards the end of the season and will be played or resumed should it have playoff implications.

==== Home-and-away records ====
Team	Division	Home		Neutral		Away	
Team	Division	GP	Record	GP	Record	GP	Record
Abra Weavers	North	3	3–0 (1.000)	19	13–6 (.684)	6	2–4 (.333)
Bacolod City of Smiles	South	—N/a		26	1–25 (.038)	2	0–2 (.000)
Bataan Risers	North	7	3–4 (.429)	17	6–11 (.353)	4	0–4 (.000)
Batangas City Tanduay Rum Masters	South	9 (Note: Batangas City's June 11 and September 10 home games were played in San Jose.)	8–1 (.889)	15	11–4 (.733)	4	1–3 (.250)
Bicolandia Oragons	South	—N/a		28	3–25 (.107)	—N/a	
Biñan Tatak Gel	South	13	8–5 (.615)	11	10–1 (.909)	4	2–2 (.500)
Bulacan Kuyas	North	—N/a		23	2–21 (.087)	4	0–4 (.000)
Caloocan Batang Kankaloo	North	13	8–5 (.615)	14	11–3 (.786)	1	0–1 (.000)
Davao Occidental Tigers	South	—N/a		17	11–6 (.647)	11	4–7 (.364)
Iloilo United Royals	South	—N/a		21	9–12 (.429)	7	1–6 (.143)
Imus Agimat	South	—N/a		27	2–25 (.074)	1	0–1 (.000)
Manila Batang Sampaloc	North	9	7–2 (.778)	15	12–3 (.800)	4	1–3 (.250)
Marikina Shoemasters	North	—N/a		25	7–18 (.280)	3	0–3 (.000)
Mindoro Tamaraws	South	1	1–0 (1.000)	26	9–17 (.346)	1	0–1 (.000)
Muntinlupa Cagers	South	—N/a		24	6–18 (.250)	4	0–4 (.000)
Negros Muscovados	South	—N/a		26	12–14 (.462)	2	0–2 (.000)
Nueva Ecija Rice Vanguards	North	5	4–1 (.800)	20	19–1 (.950)	3	1–2 (.333)
Pampanga Giant Lanterns	North	12 (Note: Pampanga's September 14 home game was played in Angeles.)	12–0 (1.000)	13	11–2 (.846)	3	3–0 (1.000)
Pangasinan Heatwaves	North	7	3–4 (.429)	14	8–6 (.571)	7	0–7 (.000)
Parañaque Patriots	South	10 (Note: Parañaque's April 9 home game was played in Las Piñas.)	4–6 (.400)	12	11–1 (.917)	6	2–4 (.333)
Pasay Voyagers	North	10	9–1 (.900)	17	9–8 (.529)	1	0–1 (.000)
Quezon Huskers	South	4	3–1 (.750)	17	14–3 (.824)	7	4–3 (.571)
Quezon City Toda Aksyon	North	2	2–0 (1.000)	21	12–9 (.571)	4	1–3 (.250)
Rizal Golden Coolers	North	1	1–0 (1.000)	20	13–7 (.650)	8	1–7 (.125)
San Juan Knights	North	11	10–1 (.909)	12	12–0 (1.000)	4	3–1 (.750)
Sarangani Marlins	South	—N/a		26	5–21 (.192)	2	0–2 (.000)
South Cotabato Warriors	South	—N/a		23	15–8 (.652)	5	2–3 (.400)
Valenzuela Classic	North	4	2–2 (.500)	16	11–5 (.688)	8	1–7 (.125)
Zamboanga Master Sardines	South	—N/a		22	16–6 (.727)	6	4–2 (.667)

== Playoffs ==
As it has been since 2019, the divisional rounds will utilize a best-of-three format, while the national finals will be best-of-five series.

=== Bracket ===
Teams in bold advanced to the next round. Teams in italics have homecourt advantage for the series. The numbers to the left of each team indicate the team's seeding in its division, while the numbers to the right indicate the number of games the team won in that round.

Division quarterfinals (best-of-3)	Division semifinals (best-of-3)
N1	**San Juan**	**2**
N8	Rizal	0
N1	**San Juan**	**2**
N5	Caloocan	0
N4	Manila	0
N5	**Caloocan**	**2**
**North Division**
N2	**Pampanga**	**2**
N7	Abra	0
N2	**Pampanga**	**2**
N3	Nueva Ecija	0
N3	**Nueva Ecija**	**2**
N6	Pasay	0
S1	**Quezon**	**2**
S8	Negros	0
S1	**Quezon**	**2**
S5	Parañaque	0
S4	Zamboanga	1
S5	**Parañaque**	**2**
**South Division**
S2	**Batangas City**	**2**
S7	Davao Occidental	0
S2	**Batangas City**	**2**
S6	South Cotabato	1
S3	Biñan	1
S6	**South Cotabato**	**2**

Division finals (best-of-3)
N1	San Juan	0
N2	**Pampanga**	**2**
S1	**Quezon**	**2**
S2	Batangas City	1

National finals (best-of-5)
N2	**Pampanga**	**3**
S1	Quezon	0

=== Division quarterfinals ===
==== North Division ====
Team 1	Series	Team 2	Game 1	Game 2	Game 3
**(1) San Juan Knights**	**2**–0	(8) Rizal Golden Coolers	**79**–64	**82**–70	—
**(2) Pampanga Giant Lanterns**	**2**–0	(7) Abra Weavers	**79**–64	**66**–65	—
**(3) Nueva Ecija Rice Vanguards**	**2**–0	(6) Pasay Voyagers	**82**–72	**75**–72	—
(4) Manila Batang Sampaloc	0–**2**	**(5) Caloocan Batang Kankaloo**	78–**79**	66–**67**	—

==== South Division ====
Team 1	Series	Team 2	Game 1	Game 2	Game 3
**(1) Quezon Huskers**	**2**–0	(8) Negros Muscovados	**73**–60	**94**–66	—
**(2) Batangas City Tanduay Rum Masters**	**2**–0	(7) Davao Occidental Tigers	**76**–66	**89**–86	—
(3) Biñan Tatak Gel	1–**2**	**(6) South Cotabato Warriors**	82–**85**	**70**–69	77–**79**
(4) Zamboanga Master Sardines	1–**2**	**(5) Parañaque Patriots**	79–**83**	**94**–72	70–**72**

=== Division semifinals ===
==== North Division ====
Team 1	Series	Team 2	Game 1	Game 2	Game 3
**(1) San Juan Knights**	**2**–0	(5) Caloocan Batang Kankaloo	**71**–65	**86**–80	—
**(2) Pampanga Giant Lanterns**	**2**–0	(3) Nueva Ecija Rice Vanguards	**76**–73	**83**–80 (OT)	—

==== South Division ====
Team 1	Series	Team 2	Game 1	Game 2	Game 3
**(1) Quezon Huskers**	**2**–0	(5) Parañaque Patriots	**75**–62	**76**–69	—
**(2) Batangas City Tanduay Rum Masters**	**2**–1	(6) South Cotabato Warriors	76–**87**	**81**–79	**73**–63

=== Division finals ===
==== North Division ====
Team 1	Series	Team 2	Game 1	Game 2	Game 3
(1) San Juan Knights	0–**2**	**(2) Pampanga Giant Lanterns**	84–**91**	73–**81**	—

==== South Division ====
Team 1	Series	Team 2	Game 1	Game 2	Game 3
**(1) Quezon Huskers**	**2**–1	(2) Batangas City Tanduay Rum Masters	69–**75**	**65**–64	**65**–60

=== National finals ===
Team 1	Series	Team 2	Game 1	Game 2	Game 3	Game 4	Game 5
**(N2) Pampanga Giant Lanterns**	**3**–0	(S1) Quezon Huskers	**88**–71	**79**–60	**65**–61	—	—

== All-Star Game ==
The 2024 MPBL All-Star Game, the league's fifth overall, took place on September 7, 2024 at the Mayor Vitaliano D. Agan Coliseum in Zamboanga City, the home arena of the Zamboanga Master Sardines. The North Division all-stars won against the South Division all-stars for the second consecutive year, 95–91. Will McAloney of the Nueva Ecija Rice Vanguards won All-Star Game MVP honors.

== Statistics ==
=== Individual leaders ===
End of regular season

Category	Player	Team	Statistic
Points per game	Jaycee Marcelino	Zamboanga Master Sardines	20.0
Rebounds per game	Justine Baltazar	Pampanga Giant Lanterns	14.8
Assists per game	Lorenzo Navarro	Manila Batang Sampaloc	7.7
Steals per game	Jaycee Marcelino	Zamboanga Master Sardines	2.5
Blocks per game	Jun Bonsubre; King Destacamento	Caloocan Batang Kankaloo; Muntinlupa Cagers	1.4

=== Team leaders ===
As of September 28, 2024

Category	Team	Statistic
Points per game	Pampanga Giant Lanterns	91.1
Rebounds per game	Pampanga Giant Lanterns	55.5
Assists per game	Pampanga Giant Lanterns	26.7
Steals per game	Marikina Shoemasters	10.8
Blocks per game	Negros Muscovados	4.0
Turnovers per game	Imus Agimat	15.9

== Awards ==
=== Individual season awards ===
Most of the league's individual awards were given out on December 7, 2024 before game 3 of the national finals series at the Bren Z. Guiao Convention Center in San Fernando, Pampanga. As per previous seasons, the Finals Most Valuable Player and Coach of the Year will be awarded at the conclusion of the national finals.

The Impact Player of the Year, which was first introduced last season, will not be awarded this season.

Award	Recipient	Team
Most Valuable Player	Justine Baltazar	Pampanga Giant Lanterns
Finals Most Valuable Player	Justine Baltazar	Pampanga Giant Lanterns
Defensive Player of the Year	Dawn Ochea	Batangas City Tanduay Rum Masters
Rookie of the Year	LJ Gonzales	Quezon Huskers
Homegrown Player of the Year	JR Olegario	Parañaque Patriots
Most Improved Player	Laurenz Victoria	Pasay Voyagers
Coach of the Year	Dennis Pineda	Pampanga Giant Lanterns
Executive of the Year	Oscar Malapitan	Caloocan Batang Kankaloo
Sportsmanship award	Nikko Panganiban	San Juan Knights

=== All-MPBL teams ===
All-MPBL First Team
Player	Team
Justine Baltazar	Pampanga Giant Lanterns
Jaycee Marcelino	Zamboanga Master Sardines
Will McAloney	Nueva Ecija Rice Vanguards
Orlan Wamar Jr.	San Juan Knights
Cedric Ablaza	Batangas City Tanduay Rum Masters

All-MPBL Second Team
Player	Team
Robby Celiz	Nueva Ecija Rice Vanguards
Archie Concepcion	Pampanga Giant Lanterns
LJay Gonzales	Quezon Huskers
JP Sarao	Parañaque Patriots
Greg Slaughter	Manila Batang Sampaloc

=== Player of the Week ===
Week	Player	Ref.
April 6–13, 2024	Mark Yee (Parañaque Patriots)	
April 15–20, 2024	Warren Bonifacio (Pasay Voyagers)	
April 22–27, 2024	Dennis Santos (Valenzuela Classic)	
April 29 – May 4, 2024	CJ Payawal (Valenzuela Classic)	
May 6–11, 2024	Michael Maestre (Biñan Tatak Gel)	
May 13–18, 2024	King Destacamento (Sarangani Marlins)	
May 20–25, 2024	Justine Baltazar (Pampanga Giant Lanterns) (1/2)	
May 27 – June 1, 2024	Greg Slaughter (Manila Batang Sampaloc)	
June 3–8, 2024	Christian Fajarito (South Cotabato Warriors)	
June 10–15, 2024	Roi Sumang (Abra Weavers)	
June 17–22, 2024	Rhinwill Yambing (Quezon City Toda Aksyon)	
June 24–29, 2024	Archie Concepcion (Pampanga Giant Lanterns) (1/2)	
July 1–6, 2024	CJ Cansino (Iloilo United Royals)	
July 8–13, 2024	Jason Opiso (Quezon Huskers)	
July 15–20, 2024	JR Olegario (Parañaque Patriots)	
July 22–27, 2024	Kenny Rocacurva (Biñan Tatak Gel)	
July 29 – August 3, 2024	Mike Malonzo (San Juan Knights)	
August 5–10, 2024	Jayvee Dela Cruz (Mindoro Tamaraws)	
August 12–17, 2024	Justine Baltazar (Pampanga Giant Lanterns) (2/2)	
August 19–24, 2024	Jaycee Marcelino (Zamboanga Master Sardines)	
August 26–31, 2024	Orlan Wamar Jr. (San Juan Knights)	
September 2–7, 2024	Not awarded	
September 9–14, 2024	Archie Concepcion (Pampanga Giant Lanterns) (2/2)	
September 16–21, 2024	Michael Calisaan (San Juan Knights)	
September 23–28, 2024	Richard Albo (Imus Agimat)	

== Notable events ==
- Ahead of the season, the MPBL banned 47 players and officials for allegedly being involved in game fixing.
- On April 16, 2024, an altercation took place following the Abra–Pasay game in which one of the game officials was attacked by bodyguards of the Abra Weavers' team owner. The league has since launched an investigation of the incident.
- On April 24, 2024, Germy Mahinay was fined and suspended indefinitely after undercutting Joey Barcuma during the Negros–Zamboanga game on April 22, which resulted in a Flagrant 2 foul leading to his ejection from the game.
- During the PBA season 49 draft on July 14, 2024, Justine Baltazar became the first MPBL player to be selected first overall in the PBA draft.

== Records and milestones ==
=== Records ===
- On June 3, 2024, the Bicolandia Oragons lost their 22nd straight game, surpassing the 2020 Soccsksargen/Sarangani Marlins for the longest overall losing streak in league history. The streak, which dates back to the 2023 season, eventually ended at 23 games following a win over the Bacolod City of Smiles on June 12.
- On August 16, the Pampanga Giant Lanterns won their 22nd straight game of the season, surpassing the 2022 Nueva Ecija Rice Vanguards for the longest single-season regular season winning streak in league history. The streak eventually ended at 23 games following a loss to the San Juan Knights on August 30.
- On August 22, the Manila Batang Sampaloc recorded 48 assists against the Bicolandia Oragons, the most assists by a team in a single game.
- On September 3, the Bacolod City of Smiles lost their 22nd straight game of the season, surpassing the 2020 Soccsksargen/Sarangani Marlins for the longest single-season losing streak in league history.
- On September 16, the Bacolod City of Smiles lost their 24th straight game, surpassing the aforementioned Bicolandia Oragons for the longest overall losing streak in league history.
- On September 19, Philip Manalang of the Parañaque Patriots broke the single-game assists record with 23 assists against the Imus Agimat, breaking the previous record held by Marwin Taywan (20) in 2022.
- On September 27, the Bacolod City of Smiles and Imus Agimat scored a combined 257 points, tying the record for the highest-scoring game between two teams alongside the 2023 Nueva Ecija–Sarangani game.
- The Pampanga Giant Lanterns and San Juan Knights both tied for the winningest regular season at 26 wins alongside the 2020 San Juan Knights, 2020 Davao Occidental Tigers, and the 2023 Pampanga Giant Lanterns.

=== Milestones ===
- April 6, 2024 – Jaycee Marcelino becomes the 29th player to reach 1,000 MPBL career points.
- April 12, 2024 – Ian Melencio becomes the 30th player to reach 1,000 MPBL career points.
- April 17, 2024 – Michael Mabulac becomes the 6th player to reach 1,000 MPBL career rebounds.
  - Michael Mabulac also becomes the 4th player to reach 1,000 MPBL career points and rebounds.
- April 20, 2024 – Robby Celiz becomes the 31st player to reach 1,000 MPBL career points.
- April 22, 2024:
  - Jhaymo Eguilos becomes the 7th player to reach 1,000 MPBL career rebounds.
    - Jhaymo Eguilos also becomes the 5th player to reach 1,000 MPBL career points and rebounds.
  - Carlo Lastimosa becomes the 32nd player to reach 1,000 MPBL career points.
- April 25, 2024 – Orlan Wamar Jr. becomes the 33rd player to reach 1,000 MPBL career points.
- April 29, 2024 – Mark Cruz becomes the 34th player to reach 1,000 MPBL career points.
- May 7, 2024 – Billy Ray Robles becomes the 35th player to reach 1,000 MPBL career points.
- May 17, 2024 – Emman Calo becomes the 36th player to reach 1,000 MPBL career points.
- June 19, 2024 – Paolo Javelona becomes the 37th player to reach 1,000 MPBL career points.
- June 21, 2024 - Jaymar Gimpayan becomes the 8th player to reach 1,000 MPBL rebounds points.
- July 11, 2024 – Larry Rodriguez becomes the 38th player to reach 1,000 MPBL career points.
- July 13, 2024 – Gab Banal becomes the 39th player to reach 1,000 MPBL career points.
- July 19, 2024 – Judel Fuentes becomes the 40th player to reach 1,000 MPBL career points.
- July 20, 2024 – Pamboy Raymundo becomes the 41st player to reach 1,000 MPBL career points.
- August 10, 2024 - Jhapz Bautista becomes the 42nd player to reach 1,000 MPBL career points.
- August 16, 2024 - Archie Concepcion becomes the 43rd player to reach 1,000 MPBL career points.
- August 26, 2024 – Yvan Ludovice becomes the 44th player to reach 1,000 MPBL career points.
- August 22, 2024 – Rhaffy Octobre becomes the 45th player to reach 1,000 MPBL career points.
- August 28, 2024 – Robbie Manalang becomes the 46th player to reach 1,000 MPBL career points.
- September 12, 2024 – Laurenz Victoria becomes the 47th player to reach 1,000 MPBL career points.
- October 8, 2024 - Justine Baltazar becomes the 48th player to reach 1,000 MPBL career points.
- October 16, 2024 - Justine Baltazar becomes the 9th player to reach 1,000 MPBL rebounds points.
  - Justine Baltazar also becomes the 6th player to reach 1,000 MPBL career points and rebounds.
- October 30, 2024 - Joco Tayongtong becomes the 49th player to reach 1,000 MPBL career points.

== Junior tournaments ==
Junior MPBL began its second season on May 5, 2024, retaining the same three age groups (14-under, 16-under, and 18-under). A new 21-under age group, billed as the Junior MPBL D-League, began its first season as well.

== Media ==
This season marked the third year of Cignal TV's broadcast partnership with the league. Media Pilipinas TV (MPTV) still handled all live television broadcasts while One PH continued to air the primetime game on a delayed basis. It was also the last season wherein Cignal held the broadcast rights as Solar Entertainment Corporation took over as the league's broadcast partner in 2025.

The games were streamed live via Pilipinas Live and online on Facebook and YouTube.
