= Pampanga Giant Lanterns =

Professional basketball team in Pampanga, Philippines

- League: MPBL (2018–2025); PSL (2022–2023)
- Founded: 2018; 8 years ago
- History: Pampanga Lanterns; 2018–2019; Pampanga Giant Lanterns; 2019–2025 (MPBL); Pampanga G Lanterns; 2022–2023 (PSL)
- Arena: Bren Z. Guiao Convention Center; AUF Sports and Cultural Center; Lapid Arena
- Location: Pampanga
- Team colors
- Main sponsor: AMG3 Construction
- Championships: MPBL: 2 (2023, 2024); PSL: 1 (2022–23)
- Conference titles: MPBL: 2 (2023, 2024)

The Pampanga Giant Lanterns (shortened as PGL and also known as Pampanga Giant Lanterns – AMG3 Construction for sponsorship reasons) were a Philippine professional basketball team based in San Fernando, Pampanga. The team last competed in the Maharlika Pilipinas Basketball League (MPBL). The team last played their home games at Bren Z. Guiao Convention Center. The Giant Lanterns are the first and only team in the MPBL to win two championships and to do so in back-to-back seasons (2023 and 2024).

The Lanterns began play in the 2018–19 season as an expansion team, and were initially based in Angeles City before moving to San Fernando in 2022. The team has also taken part in the Pilipinas Super League (PSL).

Despite barely missing the playoffs in their inaugural season, the team has since grown to prominence. Since then, the team finished top four in the North Division In late 2022, the team would have its biggest acquisition in Justine Baltazar, where he alongside head coach Dennis Pineda led PGL to three championships in a two-year span, two in the MPBL and one in the PSL. Alongside Balti, the team has also relied on its homegrown players, such as Archie Concepcion and Encho Serrano, becoming key players for the Pampanga franchise.

== History ==
=== 2018–2020: Beginnings in Angeles ===
Pampanga first joined the Maharlika Pilipinas Basketball League (MPBL) as one of sixteen expansion teams for the 2018–19 season. The team first played their first two seasons in Angeles City. The team tied with the Caloocan Supremos for the 8th seed in the playoffs, as both teams share a record of 11–14. The latter got ahead of Pampanga due to the head-to-head tiebreaker, causing the Lanterns to miss the playoffs.

Playoff hopes for Pampanga didn't stop there, as in the 2019–20 season, the team moved up to 4th with a record of 21–9, giving them their first playoff appearance. In the playoffs, the team first met with their Central Luzon neighbor Bataan Risers in the First Round, in which Pampanga beat in two games. Afterwards, they met the defending champion San Juan Knights in the division semifinals, where San Juan would beat Pampanga in two games.

=== 2022–present: Move to San Fernando ===
The 2022 season saw the team move to San Fernando. That season also saw Pampanga finish 4th, with a record of 14–7. Once again, the team met Bataan in the First Round, but this time, Bataan won game 2 in overtime to force a third game. Even then, Pampanga beat Bataan in game 3 to once again advance to the division semifinals. They then met another Central Luzon neighbor, this time being the undefeated Nueva Ecija Rice Vanguards, in which Nueva Ecija would sweep Pampanga out of the playoffs once again. Archie Concepcion would also win the Homegrown Player of the Year award that season.

==== 2022–2024: The Justine Baltazar era ====
In between the 2022 and 2023 MPBL seasons, the Pampanga Giant Lanterns franchise made its way to the Pilipinas Super League for the 2022 DUMPER Cup. It was at that time in which homegrown big man Justine Baltazar made his arrival to the team in December. The team finished with a 10–5 record, ending up in a three-way tie between them, Santa Rosa, and Caloocan. In the head-to-head tiebreaker, Pampanga finished ahead of both teams, claiming the 4th seed in the playoffs. Pampanga beat Santa Rosa and undefeated San Juan on their way to the finals against the Davao Occidental Tigers. Pampanga went on to beat Davao Occidental in two games to clinch their first-ever championship in franchise history.

Following their PSL championship, the team made its way back to the MPBL for the 2023 season. In May, the team acquired former Phoenix Super LPG Fuel Masters player Encho Serrano, which helped the team catapult to a league-leading 26–2 record, only losing to Batangas City and Makati during the regular season. The 26 wins is tied for the most regular season wins in a single season in the MPBL, together with San Juan and Davao Occidental in 2020. In time for the division quarterfinals, nine-time PBA champion Arwind Santos joined the Giant Lanterns. The team continued their dominance from the regular season by not losing a single game en route to the 2023 MPBL finals against the Bacoor City Strikers. In three games, they would go to win their first MPBL title on December 2, 2023. The Pampanga Giant Lanterns became the first MPBL team to go undefeated throughout the playoffs, winning nine straight games. Throughout their playoff run, Pampanga also clinched the first series sweeps in both the division finals and national finals.

The team then took part in the 2024 Preseason Invitational, with Jeff Viernes joining the preseason squad. After a sweep in the group stage, the Giant Lanterns would make the finals against the South Cotabato Warriors, which they would win 93–75, making them the first Luzon-based Invitational champions. On August 16, 2024, the Giant Lanterns broke the record for most regular season wins in a single season with their 22nd straight win, surpassing that of the 2022 Nueva Ecija Rice Vanguards.

== Team identity ==
The team is named after the Giant Lantern Festival which takes place in San Fernando., but the word "giant" was left out in their inaugural season, simply going by the Pampanga Lanterns. Once the 2019–20 season started, the team was renamed into its current form: the Pampanga Giant Lanterns. During its PSL stint, the team's name was shortened to the Pampanga G Lanterns.

== Home venues ==
During the team's Angeles City era, the team played their home games at AUF Sports and Cultural Center on the campus of Angeles University Foundation. Since their move to San Fernando in 2022, the team's home games are played at Bren Z. Guiao Convention Center. In 2024, the Giant Lanterns returned to AUF for one home game.

Venue	Location	2018–19	2019–20	2022	2023	2024	2025
AUF Sports and Cultural Center	Angeles, Pampanga	✓	✓	✗	✗	✓	✗
Bren Z. Guiao Convention Center	San Fernando, Pampanga	✗	✗	✓	✓	✓	✓

== Current roster ==
Pampanga Giant Lanterns roster
Players

Pos.	No.	Name	Height	Weight	DOB	From
C	1	Larry Muyang (HG, RS)	6 ft 6 in (1.98 m)	220 lb (100 kg)	1995–06–04	Letran
G/F	2	Archie Concepcion (HG)	6 ft 2 in (1.88 m)	189 lb (86 kg)		Arellano
G	6	Miguel Pangilinan	6 ft 2 in (1.88 m)			UST
F	6	Wilson Baltazar (HG)	6 ft 3 in (1.91 m)
F/C	8	Jhaymo Eguilos	6 ft 6 in (1.98 m)	190 lb (86 kg)	1986–08–27	Far Eastern
G	10	John Loyd Clemente (HG)	6 ft 3 in (1.91 m)			National-U
G	13	Donald Gumaru	5 ft 11 in (1.80 m)	160 lb (73 kg)	1992–09–20	Arellano
	14	Gholamreza Garcia				UST
G/F	15	Rence Alcoriza	6 ft 0 in (1.83 m)			Arellano
G	17	CJ Delfino (HG)	5 ft 10 in (1.78 m)			Letran
G	18	Andrey Armenion	5 ft 11 in (1.80 m)			UE
G/F	24	Joshua dela Cruz (HG)
C	25	Matt de Leon (HG)	6 ft 7 in (2.01 m)			Arellano
G	30	Raymond Binuya (HG)	5 ft 8 in (1.73 m)			San Sebastian
G	77	Renz Palma	6 ft 0 in (1.83 m)	187 lb (85 kg)	1993–01–03	UE
	98	Danico Pineda (RS)
	—	Sonny Estil (RS)
	—	Carlo Ferreras (RS)
G	—	Jhan Nermal (RS)	6 ft 3 in (1.91 m)			STI WNU
	—	Arthur Roque (RS)

Coaches

Head coach

- Frederick Dimatulac

Assistant coach(es)

- Luis Márquez
- Billy Bansil
- Jordan Viray
- Camille Istle Santos
- Jay Sierra

Legend

- (HG) Homegrown
- (FF) Filipino-foreigner
- (SGL) Special Guest Licensee
- (RS) Reserve player
- Injured

- Roster – via Genius Sports
Updated as of: March 4, 2025

=== Head coaches ===
Pampanga Giant Lanterns head coaches
#	Name	Start	End	Achievements	Ref.
1	Isaiah Duenas	2018	2018	—	
2	Aldrin Morante	2018	2019	—	
3	Bong Ramos	2019	2020	—	
4	Jordan Viray	2022	2022	—	
5	Dennis Pineda	2022	2024	2x MPBL Coach of the Year (2023, 2024)	
6	Frederick Dimatulac	2024	2025	—	

== Notable players ==
=== Individual award winners ===
MPBL finals Most Valuable Player

- Justine Baltazar – 2023, 2024

MPBL Most Valuable Player

- Justine Baltazar – 2023, 2024

MPBL All-Star Game Most Valuable Player

- Justine Baltazar – 2023

MPBL Homegrown Player of the Year

- Archie Concepcion – 2022

All-MPBL First Team

- Justine Baltazar – 2023, 2024

All-MPBL Second Team

- Archie Concepcion – 2023, 2024
- Larry Muyang – 2025

PSL Finals Most Valuable Player

- Justine Baltazar – 2023

=== All-Stars ===
MPBL All-Star selections

- Levi Hernandez – 2019
- Michael Juico – 2020
- Archie Concepcion – 2022
- Justine Baltazar – 2023, 2024
- Encho Serrano – 2023

MPBL All-Star Game head coaches

- Dennis Pineda – 2023, 2024

MPBL pre-game event winners

- CJ Gania – Slam Dunk Showdown (2023)
- Joe Gomez de Llaño – Slam Dunk Showdown (2024)

PSL All-Star selections

- Justine Baltazar – 2023
- Raymond Binuya – 2023
- Kurt Reyson – 2023
- Louie Sangalang – 2023

=== PBA players ===
Ex-PBA players

- Jimbo Aquino
- Juneric Baloria
- Reil Cervantes
- Mark Cruz
- Gary David
- Jammer Jamito
- Michael Juico
- Arwind Santos
- Jeff Viernes

Drafted to PBA

- Larry Muyang – 7th overall, season 46
- Justine Baltazar – 1st overall, season 49
- Miguel Corteza – 20th overall, season 49
- Sonny Estil – 11th overall, season 50

== Season-by-season records ==
League champions
Division champions
Qualified for playoffs
Best regular season record

=== Maharlika Pilipinas Basketball League ===
Season	Regular season							Playoffs	
Season	Division	Finish	GP	W	L	PCT	GB	Stage	Results
Pampanga Lanterns
2018–19; Datu Cup	North	9th	25	11	14	.440	12	Did not qualify	
Pampanga Giant Lanterns
2019–20; Lakan Season	North	4th	30	21	9	.700	5	Division quarterfinals Division semifinals	won vs. Bataan, 2–0 lost vs. San Juan, 0–2
2022	North	4th	21	14	7	.667	7	Division quarterfinals Division semifinals	won vs. Bataan, 2–1 lost vs. Nueva Ecija, 0–2
2023	North	1st	28	26	2	.929	—	Division quarterfinals Division semifinals Division finals National finals	won vs. Marikina, 2–0 won vs. Caloocan, 2–0 won vs. San Juan, 2–0 won vs. Bacoor City, 3–0
2024	North	2nd	28	26	2	.929	–	Division quarterfinals Division semifinals Division finals National Finals	won vs. Abra, 2–0 won vs. Nueva Ecija, 2–0 won vs. San Juan, 2–0 won vs. Quezon, 3–0
2025	North	5th	29	21	8	.724	7	Division quarterfinals	lost vs. Caloocan, 0–2
Did not participate from 2026
All-time regular season record			161	119	42	.739		5 playoff appearances	
All-time playoff record			29	22	7	.759		2 finals appearance	
All-time overall record			190	141	49	.742		2 championships	

=== Pilipinas Super League ===
Tournament	Elimination round						Playoffs	
Tournament	Finish	GP	W	L	PCT	GB	Stage	Results
Pampanga G Lanterns
2022–23; DUMPER Cup	4th	15	10	5	.667	5	Quarterfinals; Semifinals; Finals	won vs. Santa Rosa, 1–0 won vs. San Juan, 2–0 won vs. Davao Occidental, 2–0
All-time elimination round record		15	10	5	.667		1 playoff appearance	
All-time playoff record		5	5	0	1.000		1 finals appearance	
All-time overall record		20	15	5	.800		1 championship	
