= 2024 MPBL finals =

Championship series of the Maharlika Pilipinas Basketball League's 2024 season

Team	Coach	Wins
Pampanga Giant Lanterns	Dennis Pineda	3
Quezon Huskers	Eric Gonzales	0
- Dates: December 1–7, 2024
- MVP: Justine Baltazar
- Northern finals: Pampanga def. San Juan, 2–0
- Southern finals: Quezon def. Batangas City, 2–1

The 2024 MPBL finals was the championship series of the Maharlika Pilipinas Basketball League's (MPBL) 2024 season and the conclusion of the season's playoffs. In the best-of-five playoff, the North Division champion Pampanga Giant Lanterns defeated the South Division champion Quezon Huskers to become the first team in the league to win two championships and to do so in back-to-back seasons. The series began on December 1 and ended on December 7.

The league played the first two games of the series in Dubai, United Arab Emirates, marking the first time a Philippine basketball league will play its championship series overseas. The league then returned home for the remainder of the series, where Pampanga, being the team with the higher regular season record, had homecourt advantage.

For the second time in a row, both teams featured will be based in Luzon but not Metro Manila. In addition, this will also be second time overall that a returning finalist or former champion will be featured, as well as the second time that one of the finalists is not a first seed in their respective division.

== Background ==
=== International games ===
The first two games of the series will be played in Dubai, United Arab Emirates, aiming to attract the country's large Filipino population, particularly in Dubai. The MPBL previously played two regular season games in Dubai in 2019 for their inaugural International Invasion series at Hamdan Sports Complex. This time, the league's international games will take place at the Rashid Bin Hamdan Indoor Hall and will be organized by DJMC, the same group behind the previous leg of Dubai games.

=== Pampanga Giant Lanterns ===
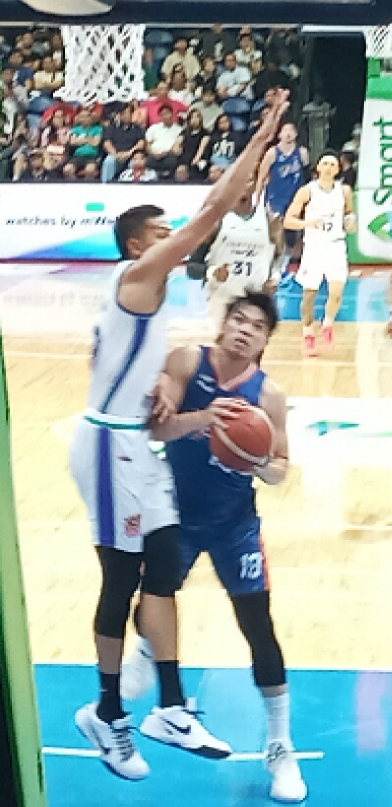
Pampanga star player Justine Baltazar was drafted by the Converge FiberXers mid-season, effectively making this his last stint with PGL before moving to the PBA.

The Pampanga Giant Lanterns entered the 2024 season as defending champions, having beaten the Bacoor City Strikers in last season's finals. The team kept their star players including Justine Baltazar, Encho Serrano, and Archie Concepcion heading into their title defense, and also won the Preseason Invitational in February. The Giant Lanterns suffered an early defeat when they lost to the Rizal Golden Coolers in their first game of the season, but were able to win a record 23 straight regular season games afterwards. The team was able to match their 26–2 record from last season, but only finished as the second seed due to having lost their regular season game against the San Juan Knights later down the line. In the playoffs, Pampanga once again swept their opponents on their way to the national stage, beating the expansion Abra Weavers in the division quarterfinals, their Central Luzon rival Nueva Ecija Rice Vanguards in the division semifinals, and ultimately defeating first-seeded San Juan all in two games to win their second division title.

Pampanga became the first team since the 2020 San Juan Knights to clinch back-to-back division championships. Should they win the series, the Giant Lanterns will become the first two-time champions and the first to do so in back-to-back seasons.

=== Quezon Huskers ===
The Quezon Huskers entered the 2024 season coming off a division quarterfinals loss to the Zamboanga Family's Brand Sardines last season. The team acquired the likes of Ljay Gonzales and former league MVP Gab Banal as the team managed to go undefeated for sixteen games, but then went on a slump, going 5–7 in their last twelve games of the season. Despite that, the Huskers held on to the top seed of the South Division after improving to a 21–7 record. The Huskers cruised through the first two rounds, beating both the Negros Muscovados and the Parañaque Patriots in two games before meeting the Batangas City Tanduay Rum Masters in the division finals. Quezon first lost game 1 and were on the verge of being eliminated in game 2 before going on a scoring run in the final minutes of the game, culminating in a game-winning tip-in by Jason Opiso to force game 3. The Huskers tied the series and went on to win the do-or-die game 3 to clinch their first division championship.

Quezon became the first professional era expansion team to reach the national finals and the third Calabarzon-based team to do so, after Batangas City in 2018 and Bacoor City in 2023. Should they win the series, the Huskers will become the second Calabarzon-based team to win the league title, also after Batangas City in 2018.

== Road to the finals ==
Pampanga Giant Lanterns (North Division champion)		Quezon Huskers (South Division champion)
Pos / Team / Pld / W / L / GB; 1 / San Juan Knights / 28 / 26 (Note: San Juan wins tiebreaker over Pampanga based on head-to-head record.) / 2 / —; 2 / Pampanga Giant Lanterns / 28 / 26 / 2 / —; 3 / Nueva Ecija Rice Vanguards / 28 / 24 / 4 / 2; 4 / Manila SV Batang Sampaloc / 28 / 20 / 8 / 6; 5 / Caloocan Batang Kankaloo / 28 / 19 / 9 / 7; 6 / Pasay Voyagers / 28 / 18 (Note: Pasay wins tiebreaker over Abra based on head-to-head record.) / 10 / 8; 7 / Abra Weavers / 28 / 18 / 10 / 8; 8 / Rizal Golden Coolers / 28 / 15 (Note: Rizal wins tiebreaker over Quezon City based on head-to-head record.) / 13 / 11; 9 / Quezon City Toda Aksyon / 28 / 15 / 13 / 11; 10 / Valenzuela Classic / 28 / 14 / 14 / 12; 11 / Pangasinan Heatwaves / 28 / 12 / 16 / 14; 12 / Bataan Risers / 28 / 9 / 19 / 17; 13 / Marikina Shoemasters / 28 / 7 / 21 / 19; 14 / Bulacan Kuyas / 28 / 2 / 26 / 24; WD / Tarlac United Force (Note: The Tarlac United Force was pulled out by the league due to the team's failure to comply with financial obligations.) / 0 / 0 / 0 / 12; Source: Standings; Notes:	Regular season	Pos / Team / Pld / W / L / GB; 1 / Quezon Huskers / 28 / 21 / 7 / —; 2 / Batangas City Tanduay Rum Masters / 28 / 20 (Note: Batangas City (1.132), Biñan (0.950), and Zamboanga (0.931) are ranked based on head-to-head point quotient.) / 8 / 1; 3 / Biñan Tatak Gel / 28 / 20 / 8 / 1; 4 / Zamboanga Master Sardines / 28 / 20 / 8 / 1; 5 / Parañaque Patriots / 28 / 17 (Note: Parañaque wins tiebreaker over South Cotabato based on head-to-head record.) / 11 / 4; 6 / South Cotabato Warriors / 28 / 17 / 11 / 4; 7 / Davao Occidental Tigers / 28 / 15 / 13 / 6; 8 / Negros Muscovados / 28 / 12 / 16 / 9; 9 / Iloilo United Royals / 28 / 11 / 17 / 10; 10 / Mindoro Tamaraws / 28 / 10 / 18 / 11; 11 / Muntinlupa Cagers / 28 / 7 / 21 / 14; 12 / Sarangani Marlins / 28 / 5 / 23 / 16; 13 / Bicolandia Oragons / 28 / 3 / 25 / 18; 14 / Imus Agimat / 28 / 2 / 26 / 19; 15 / Bacolod City of Smiles / 28 / 1 / 27 / 20; Source: Standings; Notes:
Defeated 7th-seeded Abra Weavers, 2–0	Division quarterfinals	Defeated 8th-seeded Negros Muscovados, 2–0
Defeated 3rd-seeded Nueva Ecija Rice Vanguards, 2–0	Division semifinals	Defeated 5th-seeded Parañaque Patriots, 2–0
Defeated 1st-seeded San Juan Knights, 2–0	Division finals	Defeated 2nd-seeded Batangas City Tanduay Rum Masters, 2–1

=== Head-to-head matchup ===
MPTV

September 14
08:00 pm

Boxscore

Pampanga Giant Lanterns	75–69	Quezon Huskers
Scoring by quarter: 21–14, 20–19, 18–24, 16–12
Pts: Archie Concepcion 30; Rebs: Justine Baltazar 17; Asts: Justine Baltazar, Kurt Reyson 3		Pts: LJ Gonzales 13; Rebs: LJ Gonzales 8 Asts: Niño Ibañez 6

AUF Sports and Cultural Center, Angeles City

== Series summary ==
For this year's national finals, the Pampanga Giant Lanterns will hold homecourt advantage for the series, as they hold a better regular season record compared to the Quezon Huskers (26–2 vs. 21–7).

Game	Date	Winning team	Result (Series)	Losing team	Venue
1	December 1	Pampanga Giant Lanterns	88–71 (1–0)	Quezon Huskers	(United Arab Emirates) Rashid Bin Hamdan Indoor Hall
2	December 3	Pampanga Giant Lanterns	79–60 (2–0)	Quezon Huskers	(United Arab Emirates) Rashid Bin Hamdan Indoor Hall
3	December 7	Pampanga Giant Lanterns	65–61 (3–0)	Quezon Huskers	Bren Z. Guiao Convention Center

== Game summaries ==
NOTE: All times are Philippine Standard Time (UTC+8:00). Games in the UAE are also listed in Gulf Standard Time (UTC+4:00).

=== Game 1 ===
MPTV

December 1
11:00 p.m. (7:00 p.m. GST)

Boxscore

Pampanga Giant Lanterns	88–71	Quezon Huskers
Scoring by quarter: 24–20, 23–15, 23–23, 18–13
Pts: Justine Baltazar 24; Rebs: Justine Baltazar 16; Asts: Michael John Garcia 8		Pts: Rodel Gravera 20; Rebs: Christian Buñag, Judel Ric Fuentes 6 Asts: Mon Abundo 7
Pampanga leads series, 1–0

Rashid Bin Hamdan Indoor Hall, Dubai
Referees: A. Manzano, C. Pingul Jr., M. Binay

=== Game 2 ===
MPTV

December 3
11:00 p.m. (7:00 p.m. GST)

Boxscore

Quezon Huskers	60–79	Pampanga Giant Lanterns
Scoring by quarter: 18–22, 14–25, 10–16, 18–16
Pts: Judel Ric Fuentes 12; Rebs: Rodel Gravera 11; Asts: Mon Abundo 4		Pts: Kurt Reyson 20; Rebs: Justine Baltazar 19; Asts: Kurt Reyson 7
Pampanga leads series, 2–0

Rashid Bin Hamdan Indoor Hall, Dubai

=== Game 3 ===
MPTV

December 7
7:00 p.m.

Boxscore

Pampanga Giant Lanterns	65–61	Quezon Huskers
Scoring by quarter: 12–8, 18–19, 16–20, 19–14
Pts: Justine Baltazar, Archie Concepcion 19; Rebs: Justine Baltazar 19; Asts: Michael John Garcia 5		Pts: Judel Ric Fuentes 21; Rebs: RJ Minerva 8 Asts: Ximone Sandagon, Alfrancis Tamsi 2
Pampanga wins series, 3–0

Bren Z. Guiao Convention Center, San Fernando, Pampanga

== Rosters ==
2024 Pampanga Giant Lanterns roster
Players

Pos.	No.	Name	Height	Weight	DOB	From
G/F	2	Archie Concepcion (HG)	6 ft 2 in (1.88 m)	189 lb (86 kg)		Arellano
G	3	Joe Gomez de Liaño	6 ft 2 in (1.88 m)
F	6	Wilson Baltazar (HG)	6 ft 3 in (1.91 m)
F/C	8	Jhaymo Eguilos	6 ft 6 in (1.98 m)	190 lb (86 kg)	1986–08–27	Far Eastern
G	11	MJ Garcia (HG)	6 ft 0 in (1.83 m)			SPCF
G	13	Kurt Reyson	5 ft 10 in (1.78 m)			Letran
G/F	15	Rence Luis Alcoriza	6 ft 0 in (1.83 m)			Arellano
G/F	18	Encho Serrano (HG)	6 ft 0 in (1.83 m)	176 lb (80 kg)	1999–09–18	De La Salle
F/C	19	Justine Baltazar (HG)	6 ft 8 in (2.03 m)	250 lb (113 kg)	1997–02–19	De La Salle
F	21	Martin Gozum (HG)	6 ft 2 in (1.88 m)
C	22	Ronan Santos (HG)	6 ft 7 in (2.01 m)			Arellano
C	25	Matt De Leon (HG)	6 ft 7 in (2.01 m)			Arellano
F	26	Lervin Flores	6 ft 5 in (1.96 m)	185 lb (84 kg)	1992–09–26	Arellano
F	29	Brandon Ramirez (HG)	6 ft 5 in (1.96 m)
G	30	Raymond Binuya (HG)	5 ft 8 in (1.73 m)			San Sebastian
G	74	Jeff Viernes	5 ft 7 in (1.70 m)	143 lb (65 kg)	1989–05–18	St. Clare

Coaches

Head coach

- Dennis Pineda
- Frederic Dimatulac

Assistant coach(es)

- Manuel Luis Marquez
- Billy Bansil
- Jordan Viray
- Camille Istle Santos
- Jay Sierra

Legend

- (HG) Homegrown
- (FF) Filipino-foreigner
- (SGL) Special Guest Licensee
- (RS) Reserve player
- Injured

- Roster – via Genius Sports
Updated as of: July 2, 2024

2024 Quezon Huskers roster
Players

Pos.	No.	Name	Height	Weight	DOB	From
G/F	1	Robin Roño				National-U
G/F	2	Judel Ric Fuentes	5 ft 10 in (1.78 m)			Centro Escolar
F	4	Rafael Salonga (HG)
F/C	5	Ximone Sandagon (HG)				Far Eastern
F	6	Bryant Placino (HG)
G/F	7	Domark Matillano
G/F	10	Mark Alcala (HG)				De La Salle
F	12	Rodel Gravera (HG)				Far Eastern
G	13	Ljay Gonzales	5 ft 11 in (1.80 m)			Far Eastern
G/F	14	Xyrus Torres	6 ft 0 in (1.83 m)		2000-09-23	Far Eastern
F/C	15	Will Gozum (injured)	6 ft 6 in (1.98 m)	205 lb (93 kg)	1999–04–08	St. Benilde
F	17	Jason Opiso				Centro Escolar
G	18	Thomas Torres	5 ft 9 in (1.75 m)		1994–10–27	De La Salle
G	20	Christopher Lagrama (HG)
F	24	RJ Minerva				National-U
G/F	25	Al Francis Tamsi	6 ft 1 in (1.85 m)	158 lb (72 kg)	1992–03–25	Far Eastern
G	29	Alvin Abundo	5 ft 8 in (1.73 m)	150 lb (68 kg)	1992–10–29	Centro Escolar
F/C	34	Lander Canon
F/C	41	Jessie Saitanan	6 ft 5 in (1.96 m)	200 lb (91 kg)	1992–10–07	Mapúa
F	44	Felipe Marasigan (HG)				St. Benilde
F/C	55	Christian Buñag
F	77	Gab Banal	6 ft 3 in (1.91 m)	200 lb (91 kg)	1990–09–09	Mapúa
G/F	99	Niño Ibañez

Coaches

Head coach

- Eric Gonzales

Assistant coach(es)

- Nash Racela
- Richie Ticzon
- Ed Dela Torre
- Luis Nolasco
- Jonathan de Guzman
- Bernard de Guia

Legend

- (HG) Homegrown
- (FF) Filipino-foreigner
- (SGL) Special Guest Licensee
- (RS) Reserve player
- Injured

- Roster – via Genius Sports
Updated as of: April 20, 2024

== Broadcasting ==
This will be the third national finals series under Cignal TV's broadcast deal. The games will be broadcast on television via Media Pilipinas TV (MPTV) and will also be streamed on Pilipinas Live and the league's social media channels.

Game	Media Pilipinas TV (MPTV)		
Game	Play-by-play	Analyst	Courtside reporters
1	Cedelf Tupas	Mike Perez	Andrea Endicio and Mica Abesamis
2	Cedelf Tupas	Mike Perez	Andrea Endicio and Mica Abesamis
3	Migs Gomez	Javi Palaña	Andrea Endicio and Mica Abesamis
