= MPBL Most Valuable Player award =

Annual Maharlika Pilipinas Basketball League award

The MPBL Most Valuable Player award is an annual Maharlika Pilipinas Basketball League award given to the best player of the regular season. It was first awarded during the 2018–19 MPBL season.

As of 2025, five players have won the award with the most recent recipient Abra's Dave Ildefonso. Justine Baltazar, being the only winner of multiple MVPs and also the only recipient who has also won Finals Most Valuable Player.

== Winners ==
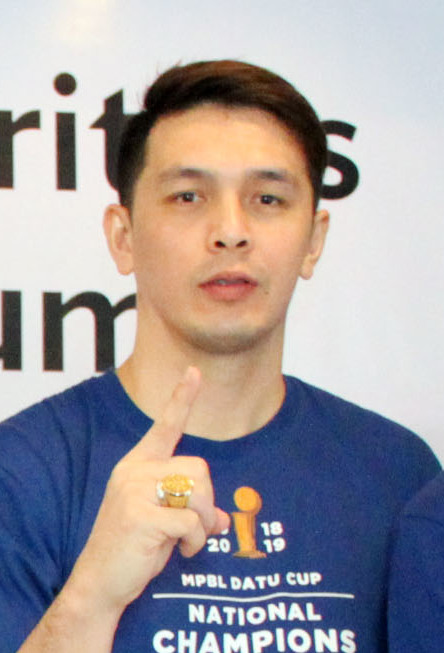
John Wilson was the recipient of the MVP award in the 2019–20 season.

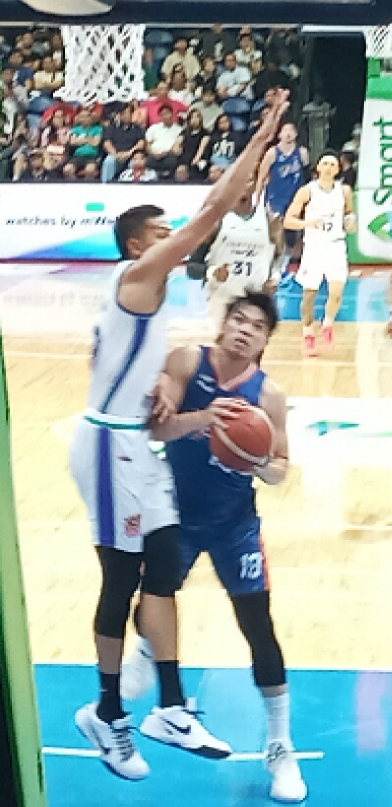
Justine Baltazar (pictured with the Converge FiberXers) is the most recent recipient and the only player to win the award multiple times (2023 and 2024).

^	Denotes player who is still active in the MPBL
†	Denotes player who is still active outside of the MPBL
Player (#)	Denotes the number of times the player had been named MVP at that time
Team (#)	Denotes the number of times a player from this team had won at that time

Season	Player	Pos.	Team	Ref.
2018–19	Gab Banal^	F	Bacoor City Strikers	
2019–20	John Wilson^	G	San Juan Knights	
2022	Jaycee Marcelino^	G	Zamboanga Family's Brand Sardines	
2023	Justine Baltazar^{†}	C	Pampanga Giant Lanterns	
2024	Justine Baltazar^{†} (2)	C	Pampanga Giant Lanterns (2)	
2025	Dave Ildefonso^	F	Abra Solid North Weavers	

== Players with most awards ==
Player	Editions	Notes
(Philippines) Justine Baltazar	2	2023, 2024
