= Mark Cruz =

Filipino basketball player

No. 9 – GenSan Warriors
- Position: Point guard
- League: MPBL

Personal information
- Born: July 27, 1992 (age 34) Quezon City, Philippines
- Listed height: 5 ft 6 in (1.68 m)
- Listed weight: 150 lb (68 kg)

Career information
- High school: Letran (Manila)
- College: Letran
- PBA draft: 2015: 3rd round, 30th overall pick
- Drafted by: Star Hotshots

Career history
- 2015–2016: Star Hotshots
- 2016: Phoenix Fuel Masters
- 2017–2018: Blackwater Elite
- 2019–2020: Pampanga Giant Lanterns
- 2021: Bicol Volcanoes
- 2022–present: GenSan / South Cotabato Warriors

Career highlights
- NCAA Philippines champion (2015); NCAA Philippines Finals Most Valuable Player (2015); NCAA Philippines Three-point Shootout champion (2015); MPBL Three-point Shootout champion (2025)

Mark Lu Cruz (born July 27, 1992) is a Filipino professional basketball player for the South Cotabato Warriors franchise of the Maharlika Pilipinas Basketball League (MPBL) and Pilipinas Super League (PSL). He earned the moniker Ant Man during his days in the NCAA.

== College career ==
Cruz studied at the Colegio de San Juan de Letran and played for the Letran Knights varsity squad. Teaming up with Kevin Alas and Raymond Almazan, and later Kevin Racal and Rey Nambatac, he propelled the Knights to the finals in 2012 and 2013, only to lose to the San Beda Red Lions on both occasions. After missing the Final Four the year before, he flourished under new coach Aldin Ayo, leading the Knights in his final collegiate year. In 2015, he led the Knights to an NCAA Championship against their nemesis San Beda, ending a 10-year title drought. He was awarded the Finals MVP.

== Professional career ==
=== Star Hotshots (2015–2016) ===
Cruz was drafted 30th overall in the 2015 PBA draft by the Star Hotshots. Unlike his fellow rookies, he signed a one-conference contract with the Hotshots. In his PBA debut he tallied seven points, two rebounds and a steal in a loss to the San Miguel Beermen. During the 2016 Commissioner's Cup, he helped Star qualify for the quarterfinals by scoring 15 of his 18 points in a win over the Mahindra Enforcers. This would be his last game with the team.

=== Phoenix Fuel Masters (2016) ===
In May 2016, Cruz was traded by Star to the Phoenix Fuel Masters in a three-team trade that also involved GlobalPort Batang Pier. Before the start of the 2016–17 season, he was released from the team.

=== Blackwater Elite (2017–2018) ===
Cruz then spent three months in the PBA D-League for the Tanduay Rhum Masters. He averaged 16.2 points, 3.6 rebounds, and 4.3 assists and led them to the semis of the 2017 D-League Aspirants' Cup. Right after, he was signed by the Blackwater Elite. In 2018, Blackwater lent him and James Sena to the iECO Green Warriors for the Terrific 12.

=== Pampanga Giant Lanterns (2019–2020) ===
After two years with Blackwater, Cruz was left unsigned by the team. This led him to sign with the Pampanga Giant Lanterns of the Maharlika Pilipinas Basketball League. He made his MPBL debut with a triple double of 16 points, 11 rebounds, and 12 assists in a win over the GenSan Warriors. He then had 14 points and 10 assists in a win over the Bulacan Kuyas. In a win over the Biñan Laguna Krah Heroes, he had a season-high 31 points. That season, they were able to secure the fourth seed. They were swept in the divisional semifinals by the San Juan Knights.

=== Bicol Volcanoes (2021) ===
On November 28, 2021, Cruz joined the Bicol Volcanoes for the 2021 MPBL Invitational tournament, reuniting with his college coach Aldin Ayo and college teammate McJour Luib.

=== GenSan / South Cotabato Warriors (2022–present) ===
In 2022, Cruz joined the GenSan Warriors. He contributed in their playoff run, in which they made the division quarterfinals. For the 2023 and 2024 seasons, they made it to the South division semifinals.

During the 2025 season, Cruz scored a career-high 32 points in a loss to Pampanga. In a 54-point blowout win over the Manila Batang Quiapo, he made nine three pointers for 27 points. He also won the three-point shootout during the 2025 MPBL All-Star Game. Once again, they lost in the South Division semifinals, this time to the Quezon Huskers.

== PBA career statistics ==
Legend
GP	Games played	MPG	Minutes per game
FG%	Field-goal percentage	3P%	3-point field-goal percentage	FT%	Free-throw percentage
RPG	Rebounds per game	APG	Assists per game	SPG	Steals per game
BPG	Blocks per game	PPG	Points per game	**Bold**	Career high

As of the end of 2017–18 season

=== Season-by-season averages ===
Year	Team	GP	MPG	FG%	3P%	FT%	RPG	APG	SPG	BPG	PPG
2015–16	Star	**25**	12.3	**.394**	**.353**	.650	1.0	1.4	.5	.0	4.2
2015–16	Phoenix	**25**	12.3	**.394**	**.353**	.650	1.0	1.4	.5	.0	4.2
2016–17	Blackwater	19	**18.8**	.381	.209	.650	**2.1**	**2.4**	**.6**	.1	**5.1**
2017–18	Blackwater	18	7.9	.170	.095	**.667**	.7	.7	.3	.0	1.1
Career		62	13.0	.346	.252	.651	1.3	1.5	.5	.0	3.6

== Personal life ==
Cruz is the younger brother of former UP Fighting Maroons star and PBA player Marvin Cruz. His first daughter was born when he was 17 years old. His favorite player growing up was Jimmy Alapag. He took up a degree in Operations Management and hopes to start a business someday.
