= Jammer Jamito =

Filipino basketball player

No. 2 – Caloocan Batang Kankaloo
- Position: Power forward / center
- League: MPBL

Personal information
- Born: September 1, 1990 (age 36) Basud, Camarines Norte, Philippines
- Listed height: 6 ft 5 in (1.96 m)
- Listed weight: 170 lb (77 kg)

Career information
- College: St. Clare College of Caloocan
- PBA draft: 2016: 2nd round, 3rd overall pick
- Drafted by: Barangay Ginebra San Miguel
- Playing career: 2019–present

Career history
- 2016–2018: Barangay Ginebra San Miguel
- 2018–2022: Meralco Bolts
- 2022: San Juan Knights
- 2022–2023: Pampanga Giant Lanters / G Lanterns
- 2023: Bacoor City Strikers
- 2024–2025: South Cotabato / GenSan Warriors
- 2025: Nueva Ecija Rice Vanguards
- 2026–present: Caloocan Batang Kankaloo

Career highlights
- PBA champion (2017 Governors')

Raymon "Jammer" Jamito (born September 1, 1990) is a Filipino professional basketball player for the Caloocan Batang Kankaloo of the Maharlika Pilipinas Basketball League (MPBL)..

== Professional career ==
=== Barangay Ginebra San Miguel ===
Jamito was the 3rd pick of the regular round in the 2016 PBA draft.

In 2017, Jamito was part of the Slam Dunk Contest during All-Star Week. The crowd expected him to jump over 6-foot-9 Japeth Aguilar. Instead, he side-stepped him and did a basic one-hand dunk, drawing laughs from the crowd. The stunt became viral, and was featured on the television show "The Starters." He also won a Governors' Cup title that year.

=== Meralco Bolts ===
In 2018, Ginebra made him an unrestricted free agent, allowing the Bolts to pick him up. He had his best game with 8 points, 4 rebounds, and one block in a loss to the Phoenix Fuel Masters.

In 2021, he was given a contract extension. He was not given another extension after that season and did not return for the 2022–23 PBA season.

=== San Juan Knights ===
Jamito then played for the San Juan Knights in the MPBL. He debuted with 14 points and seven rebounds in a win over the Valenzuela XUR Homes Realty Inc.

== PBA career statistics ==
Legend
GP	Games played	MPG	Minutes per game
FG%	Field-goal percentage	3P%	3-point field-goal percentage	FT%	Free-throw percentage
RPG	Rebounds per game	APG	Assists per game	SPG	Steals per game
BPG	Blocks per game	PPG	Points per game	**Bold**	Career high

As of the end of 2021 season

=== Season-by-season averages ===
Year	Team	GP	MPG	FG%	3P%	FT%	RPG	APG	SPG	BPG	PPG
2016–17	Barangay Ginebra	10	3.4	.471	—	—	1.4	**.4**	**.1**	.1	1.6
2017–18	Barangay Ginebra	12	6.6	.400	.000	.333	1.8	.2	—	.2	1.8
2017–18	Meralco	12	6.6	.400	.000	.333	1.8	.2	—	.2	1.8
2019	Meralco	14	2.3	**.727**	—	**.667**	.6	.1	–	.1	1.3
2020	Meralco	**16**	**9.5**	.481	.000	.636	**2.7**	.3	**.1**	.1	**3.6**
2021	Meralco	10	4.5	.421	—	**.667**	2.5	.1	—	**.4**	1.8
Career		62	5.5	.476	.000	.565	1.8	.2	.0	.1	2.1

== Personal life ==
Jamito is also known for his vlogs on YouTube, with around 20k subscribers.
