= Justine Baltazar =

Filipino basketball player (born 1997)

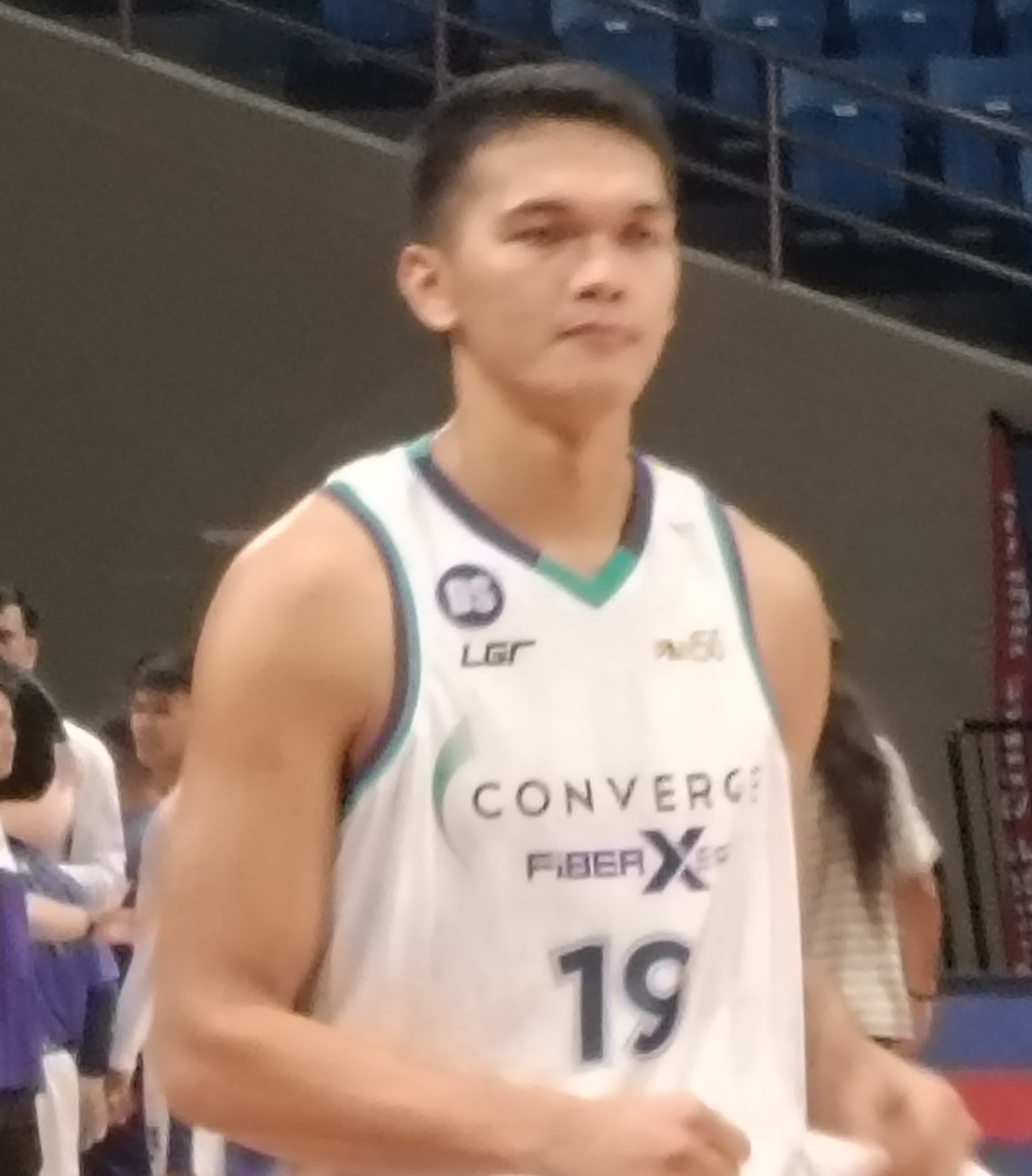
- Baltazar in 2025

No. 19 – Converge FiberXers
- Position: Power forward / center
- League: PBA

Personal information
- Born: February 19, 1997 (age 29) Mabalacat, Pampanga, Philippines
- Listed height: 6 ft 9 in (207 cm)
- Listed weight: 249 lb (113 kg)

Career information
- High school: NSNU (Manila)
- College: De La Salle
- PBA draft: 2024: 1st round, 1st overall pick
- Drafted by: Converge FiberXers
- Playing career: 2019–present

Career history
- 2019: San Juan Knights
- 2022: Pampanga Delta
- 2022: Hiroshima Dragonflies
- 2023–2024: Pampanga G Lanterns / Giant Lanterns
- 2024–present: Converge FiberXers

Career highlights
- PBA All-Star (2026); PBA All-Rookie Team (2025); 2× MPBL champion (2023, 2024); 2× MPBL Most Valuable Player (2023, 2024); 2× MPBL Finals MVP (2023, 2024); 2× All-MPBL First Team (2023, 2024); 2× MPBL All-Star (2023, 2024); MPBL All-Star Game MVP (2023); PSL champion (2023); PSL Finals MVP (2023); UAAP champion (2016); 3× UAAP Mythical Team (2018, 2019, 2021)

Justine Sagaya Baltazar (born February 19, 1997), nicknamed "Balti", is a Filipino professional basketball player for the Converge FiberXers of the Philippine Basketball Association (PBA). He is listed at 6 feet 9 ½ inches (2.07 m).

Baltazar played his college career with the De La Salle Green Archers and had a short stint with the San Juan Knights of the MPBL. In 2022, he would make his professional debut with the Pampanga Delta before moving to Japan's B.League to play for the Hiroshima Dragonflies.

In 2023, Baltazar returned to domestic basketball to once again play for his hometown, this time with the Pampanga Giant Lanterns in both the Pilipinas Super League (PSL) and later the Maharlika Pilipinas Basketball League (MPBL). During his stint with the Giant Lanterns, he won numerous accolades, including three championships, three finals MVPs, and two season MVPs across both leagues. He became the first player in the MPBL to win two finals MVPs and season MVPs, where he won in both 2023 and 2024.

He would later be selected first overall by the Converge FiberXers during the PBA season 49 draft in 2024. He was also selected to three UAAP Mythical Teams while playing for De La Salle.

== Early life and education ==
Baltazar was born on February 19, 1997 in Mabalacat, Pampanga. He moved to Metro Manila in 2012 to attend the Nazareth School of National University. In college, he attended De La Salle University.

== High school and college career ==
Baltazar played in the University Athletic Association of the Philippines (UAAP) in high school and college. In the juniors' (high school) division he played for the Nazareth School of National University Bullpups. Baltazar led the team to a runner-up finish in UAAP Season 77 in 2015 and to the title in UAAP Season 78 in 2016. He later transferred to De La Salle University to play for the De La Salle Green Archers, also of the UAAP, for college.

== Professional career ==
=== Pampanga Delta (2022) ===
Baltazar entered the PBA season 47 draft but later withdrew after an offer from a team from the Japanese B.League. He would later make his professional debut with his hometown team Pampanga Delta of the NBL–Philippines playing a game on the same day as the PBA draft. He played for Pampanga before in the 2019–20 season, when the NBL–Philippines was still an amateur league.

=== Hiroshima Dragonflies (2022) ===
In May 2022, Baltazar signed with the Hiroshima Dragonflies of the B.League for the 2022–23 season. He was set to join the team after the conclusion of his stint with the Delta in the 2022 NBL–Philippines season. However, he was released on December 20, 2022.

On January 4, 2023, Baltazar announced his commitment to play for the Seoul Samsung Thunders of the Korean Basketball League. However, he failed for show up for the team and the KBL would eventually ban him from the league for two years for a breach of contract.

=== Pampanga Giant Lanterns (2023–2024) ===
Baltazar then returned to representing his hometown, this time with the Pampanga Giant Lanterns franchise. In the Pilipinas Super League, he led the team to its first professional league title after defeating the Davao Occidental Tigers in the finals of the 2022–23 DUMPER Cup.

He stayed with the franchise for the 2023 season of the Maharlika Pilipinas Basketball League, helping the homegrown-laden team start the season 17–0 and going on to clinch the best record in the league that season at 26–2. He then went on to become season MVP and Finals MVP as the Giant Lanterns swept the Bacoor City Strikers in the 2023 MPBL finals.

In the succeeding 2024 season, Balti continued to lead Pampanga as they tied for the best regular season record and back-to-back berths into the national finals. He then went on to lead the team to back-to-back titles after sweeping the Quezon Huskers in the 2024 MPBL finals, earning his second MPBL Finals MVP nod, becoming the first team to do so. He also became the first player to win two regular season MVP nods.

=== Converge FiberXers (2024–present) ===
On July 3, 2024, Baltazar would declare for the PBA draft once again, this time for season 49. He was selected with the first overall pick by the Converge FiberXers, but committed to finished the 2024 MPBL season with the Giant Lanterns as per his contract with the team. On December 11, 2024, he officially signed with Converge.

== National team career ==
Baltazar has played for the Philippine national team. He suited up for the national team in the 2022 FIBA Asia Cup qualifiers and the 2020 FIBA Olympic Qualifying Tournament both in mid-2021.

Coach Tim Cone said, they reportedly tried to acquire the services of Baltazar for the national team in 2022 Asian Games and the in late 2023. This also included the 2023 FIBA Basketball World Cup under coach Chot Reyes. Cone at the time stated, Baltazar expressed "zero interest" to play. Baltazar and Pampanga Giant Lanterns governor Dennis Pineda insist that Baltazar never received a formal invite disputing the claim of the player's lack of interest to play.

Baltazar was named again as part of the pool for the 2027 FIBA Basketball World Cup Asian qualifiers in February 2026. He states he has put aside the misunderstanding three years ago to join the national team still coached by Cone.

== Personal life ==
Baltazar is married to Rizza with whom he has a son.

== Career statistics ==
=== PBA ===
Legend
GP	Games played	MPG	Minutes per game	FG%	Field-goal percentage
3FG%	3-point field-goal percentage	4P%	4-point field-goal percentage	FT%	Free-throw percentage
RPG	Rebounds per game	APG	Assists per game	SPG	Steals per game
BPG	Blocks per game	PPG	Points per game	**127**	Career high

As of the end of 2024–25 season

==== Season-by-season averages ====
Year	Team	GP	MPG	FG%	3P%	4P%	FT%	RPG	APG	SPG	BPG	PPG
2024–25	Converge	24	31.5	.511	.400	.000	.700	10.1	2.2	.9	1.0	12.2
Career		24	31.5	.511	.400	.000	.700	10.1	2.2	.9	1.0	12.2

=== MPBL ===
Legend
GP	Games played	GS	Games started	MPG	Minutes per game
FG%	Field-goal percentage	3P%	3-point field-goal percentage	FT%	Free-throw percentage
RPG	Rebounds per game	APG	Assists per game	SPG	Steals per game
BPG	Blocks per game	PPG	Points per game	**Bold**	Career high

As of the end of 2023 season

==== Season-by-season averages ====
Year	Team	GP	GS	MPG	FG%	3P%	FT%	RPG	APG	SPG	BPG	PPG
2019–20	San Juan	3	0	21.5	.520	.000	.500	12.3	2.0	0.3	**2.0**	11.0
2023	Pampanga	**36**	**31**	**31.3**	**.544**	**.250**	.635	**16.9**	4.6	**1.6**	1.1	**17.1**
2024	Pampanga	33	30	30.7	.505	.179	**.689**	16.1	**5.8**	1.2	1.2	15.7

=== B.League ===
Legend
GP	Games played	MPG	Minutes per game
FG%	Field-goal percentage	3P%	3-point field-goal percentage	FT%	Free-throw percentage
RPG	Rebounds per game	APG	Assists per game	SPG	Steals per game
BPG	Blocks per game	PPG	Points per game	**Bold**	Career high

Year	Team	GP	MPG	FG%	3P%	FT%	RPG	APG	SPG	BPG	PPG
2022–23	Hiroshima	8	1.7	.333	.000	—	.1	.1	.1	—	.3
Career		8	1.7	.333	.000	—	.1	.1	.1	—	.3
