= Bren Z. Guiao Convention Center =

Indoor arena in San Fernando, Pampanga, Philippines

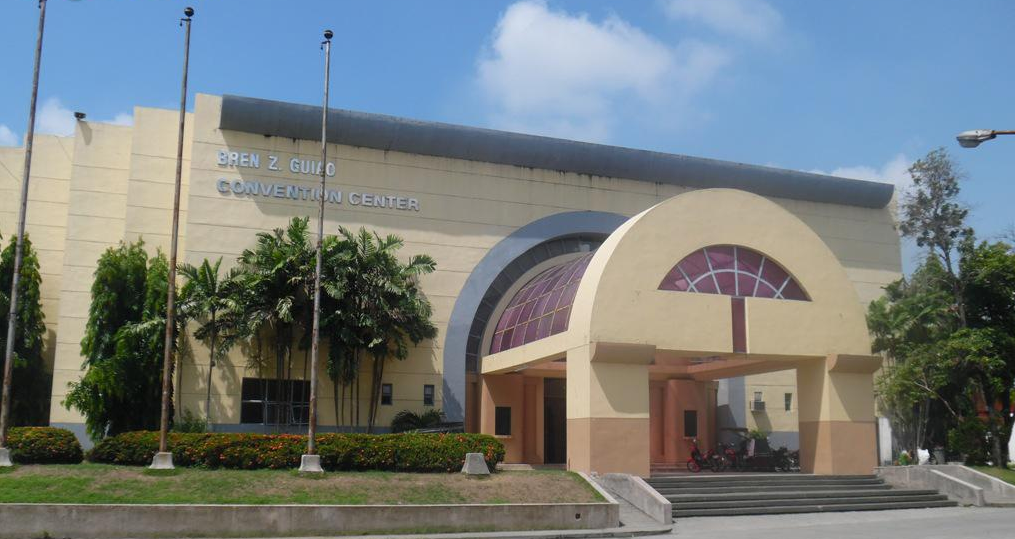
- Interactive map of Bren Z. Guiao Convention Center
- Location: San Fernando, Pampanga, Philippines
- Coordinates: 15°01′47.8″N 120°41′14.7″E
- Capacity: 3,000

Tenants
- Philippine Basketball Association (out-of-town games); Premier Volleyball League (Tour games); Pampanga Dragons (MBA); Pampanga Delta (NBL); Pampanga Giant Lanterns (MPBL/PSL); Pampanga Royce (PSL)

Bren Z. Guiao Convention Center is an indoor arena in San Fernando, Pampanga, Philippines. Located at the Bren Z. Guiao Sports Complex (formerly Pampanga Sports Complex), the arena is current home to the Pampanga Giant Lanterns of the Maharlika Pilipinas Basketball League (MPBL) and has also hosted out-of-town games for the Philippine Basketball Association (PBA) and Premier Volleyball League (PVL).

It also hosted games of the Pampanga Dragons of the Metropolitan Basketball Association (MBA), the Pampanga Delta of NBL–Pilipinas, and the Pampanga Royce of the Pilipinas Super League (PSL).

The arena and the entire sports complex is named after former Pampanga governor Bren Guiao, who oversaw the sports complex's construction.

== History ==
In March 25, 2018, the Premier Volleyball League hosted the preseason PVL on Tour with a doubleheader of games. The Petro Gazz Angels faced off against the Chooks-to-Go Tacloban Fighting Warays in the first game while the Creamline Cool Smashers and BPI Globe BanKo Perlas Spikers battled in the second game. On April 28 and 29, the arena hosted the grand finals of the sixth season of Pilipinas Got Talent.

In 2022, the Pampanga Giant Lanterns of the Maharlika Pilipinas Basketball League began playing their home games at the arena, marking their move to San Fernando after playing at AUF Sports and Cultural Center in Angeles City from 2018 to 2020. The team hosted the first two games of the 2023 MPBL finals and the third game of the 2024 MPBL finals at the venue. At the latter, they would also win the MPBL title on home soil.

On May 10, 2025, the arena hosted its first Philippine Basketball Association game with the Converge FiberXers facing off against the Barangay Ginebra San Miguel. From May 24 to 30, the 2025 SEABA Under-16 Cup will be held at the venue, serving as qualification for the 2025 FIBA Under-16 Asian Cup.

== Events ==
=== PBA out-of-town games ===
Date	Winning team	Result	Losing team	Ref.
May 10, 2025	Barangay Ginebra San Miguel	85–66	Converge FiberXers	

== Bren Z. Guiao Sports Complex ==
The arena is part of Bren Z. Guiao Sports Complex, which also includes a stadium with a single grandstand.

Preceded by AUF Sports and Cultural Center	Home of the Pampanga Giant Lanterns; 2022–present	Succeeded by current
