= 2026 Premier Volleyball League on Tour =

Preseason series of the 2026–27 PVL season

- Duration: July 8 – August 22, 2026
- Teams: 9
- Matches: 12
- TV partner(s): One Sports; One Sports+
- Streaming partner(s): Cignal Play; Pilipinas Live; One Sports YouTube Channel

PVL on Tour chronology
- < 2025

PVL conference chronology
- < 2026 All-Filipino 2026 Invitational >

The 2026 Premier Volleyball League on Tour, also known as the PVL on Tour Showdown, was a series of preseason matches ahead of the 2026–27 season of the Premier Volleyball League (PVL). The series started on July 8 and ended on August 22, with all matches to be played outside of Metro Manila. This was the third running of the PVL on Tour as its own series.

Unlike the 2025 edition, the Tour won't be its own tournament similar to the 2017 edition. Instead, the series features an experimental ruleset different from traditional play. There will also be a prize pot for all matches.

The Tour was supposed to run from July 4 to August 15, but was later adjusted with the July 4 matches shifted to July 8 and the July 18 matches postponed to August 22. On August 7, 2026, The PVL postponed the August 8 matches due to the effects of tropical depression 'Maymay'.

== Participating teams ==
2026 Premier Volleyball League on Tour teams
Abbr.	Team	Affiliation	Head coach	Team captain
AKA	Akari Chargers	Akari Lighting & Technology	(Philippines) Tina Salak	Justine Jazareno
CAP	Capital1 Solar Spikers	CapitalOne Energy Corp.	(Brazil) Jorge de Brito	Pauline Gaston
CMF	Choco Mucho Flying Titans	Republic Biscuit Corporation	(Philippines) Dante Alinsunurin	Desiree Cheng
CCS	Creamline Cool Smashers	Republic Biscuit Corporation	(Philippines) Sherwin Meneses	Alyssa Valdez
FFF	Farm Fresh Foxies	Farm Fresh Philippine International / Strong Group Athletics	(Japan) Koji Tsuzurabara	Louie Romero
GTH	Galeries Tower Highrisers	Grand Taipan Land Development	(Philippines) Aying Esteban	Julia Coronel
NXL	Nxled Chameleons	Akari Lighting & Technology	(Italy) Ettore Guidetti	Brooke Van Sickle
HSH	PLDT High Speed Hitters	PLDT Inc.	(Philippines) Rald Ricafort	Kath Arado
ZUS	Zus Coffee Thunderbelles	Zuspresso Sdn. Bhd. / Strong Group Athletics	(Philippines) Jerry Yee	Cloanne Mondoñedo

=== National team players ===
In preparation for the 2026 Asian Games, teams with players committed to the Philippines national team allowed them to prepare for the competition. This also means that national team players cannot compete in the Tour.

Team	Player(s)
Akari Chargers	Mars Alba; Justine Jazareno; Fifi Sharma
Capital1 Solar Spikers	Mhicaela Belen; Vanie Gandler; Erika Santos
Choco Mucho Flying Titans	Dawn Macandili-Catindig; Eya Laure
Creamline Cool Smashers	Jia de Guzman; Jen Nierva
PLDT High Speed Hitters	Dell Palomata
Zus Coffee Thunderbelles	Thea Gagate

== Venues ==
Matchday 1 (July 8)	Matchday 2 (July 11)	Matchday 3 (July 25) (Note: The Vigan stop was originally scheduled for July 18, but was later shifted to July 25, which in turn was originally matchday 4. The matches originally scheduled for July 18 were postponed to August 22.)	Matchday 4 (August 1)
Ilagan, Isabela	Batangas City, Batangas	Vigan, Ilocos Sur	Polomolok, South Cotabato
Capital Arena	Batangas City Sports Center	Chavit Coliseum	Polomolok Gymnasium
Capacity: 10,000	Capacity: 4,000	Capacity: 9,000	Capacity: 6,000

Matchday 5 (August 8) Cancelled (Note: The Santiago stop was originally scheduled to be played on August 8, but was cancelled the day prior due to weather conditions brought by Tropical Depression Maymay. To make up for the cancellation, a Santiago stop will be scheduled for the next All-Filipino Conference.)	Matchday 6 (August 15) (Note: The Lanao del Norte stop was originally scheduled for July 25, but was later shifted to August 15, which in turn was originally matchday 7.)	Matchday 7 (August 22)
Santiago, Isabela	Tubod, Lanao del Norte	Victorias, Negros Occidental
Santiago City Sports Arena	Mindanao Civic Center	Victorias City Coliseum
Capacity: 8,000	Capacity: 4,500	Capacity: 8,000

== Format ==
The 2026 Tour features an experimental ruleset that will only be used for this series.

- The winning team of each match is awarded ₱100,000 while the losing team is awarded ₱50,000.
- During the first two sets, all players must have participated in at least three rallies. The rule is similar to the "all-to-play" rule first used by the Philippine Super Liga in the 2017 Invitational Cup.
- All matches include the Premier Ball, first used during the 2026 Volleyball All-Star Showcase. The captain of the serving team can activate the Premier Ball as long as neither team has reached 22 points in the current set (12 in the fifth set). This will make the next rally score two points instead of one and can be done once per set per team.

== Results summary ==
Team	Game			
Team	1	2	3	4
Akari (AKA)	ZUS; 1–3	CMF; 3–1	HSH; 1–3	
Capital1 (CAP)	NXL; 0–3	CCS; *Aug. 8	FFF; 2–3	
Choco Mucho (CMF)	ZUS; 0–3	HSH; 1–3	AKA; 1–3	
Creamline (CCS)	NXL; 3–1	CAP; *Aug. 8	GTH; 3–0	
Farm Fresh (FFF)	GTH; 1–3	NXL; 3–0	CAP; 3–2	
Galeries Tower (GTH)	FFF; 3–1	NXL; 0–3	CCS; 0–3	
Nxled (NXL)	CCS; 1–3	CAP; 3–0	GTH; 3–0	FFF; 0–3
PLDT (HSH)	CMF; 3–1	ZUS; *Aug. 8	AKA; 3–1	
Zus Coffee (ZUS)	AKA; 3–1	CMF; 3–0	HSH; *Aug. 8	

Source: Premier Volleyball League
Legend: Blue = win; Red = loss
- August 8 matches were cancelled due to Tropical Depression Maymay.

== Matches ==
- All times are Philippine Standard Time (UTC+8:00).

July 8, 2026; 4:00 pm	Zus Coffee Thunderbelles	3–1	Akari Chargers	Capital Arena, Ilagan, Isabela; Attendance: 2,400; Referees: Joffer Educado (PHI), Val Basilio (PHI)
July 8, 2026; 4:00 pm	(25–11, 25–23, 26–28, 25–17); P2			Capital Arena, Ilagan, Isabela; Attendance: 2,400; Referees: Joffer Educado (PHI), Val Basilio (PHI)
July 8, 2026; 4:00 pm	Scoring leaders			Capital Arena, Ilagan, Isabela; Attendance: 2,400; Referees: Joffer Educado (PHI), Val Basilio (PHI)
Nolasco (15/61)		Total	Soyud (16/63)
Nolasco (11/27)		Attack	Soyud (14/42)
2 players, 4 each		Block	Ancheta (4/16)
Miner (2/9)		Serve	Soyud (2/8)

July 8, 2026; 6:30 pm	Creamline Cool Smashers	3–1	Nxled Chameleons	Capital Arena, Ilagan, Isabela; Attendance: 3,400; Referees: Joven Racelis (PHI), Joffer Educado (PHI)
July 8, 2026; 6:30 pm	(25–18, 25–23, 16–25, 25–19); P2			Capital Arena, Ilagan, Isabela; Attendance: 3,400; Referees: Joven Racelis (PHI), Joffer Educado (PHI)
July 8, 2026; 6:30 pm	Scoring leaders			Capital Arena, Ilagan, Isabela; Attendance: 3,400; Referees: Joven Racelis (PHI), Joffer Educado (PHI)
Gumabao (18/49)		Total	Phillips (13/46)
Gumabao (16/37)		Attack	Phillips (11/20)
6 players, 1 each		Block	Sabete-Escamillan (4/14)
Gumabao (1/7)		Serve	Sabete-Escamillan (2/16)

July 11, 2026; 4:00 pm	Galeries Tower Highrisers	3–1	Farm Fresh Foxies	Batangas City Sports Center, Batangas City, Batangas; Attendance: 3,313; Referees: Patrick Castillo (PHI), Marlon Macabenta (PHI)
July 11, 2026; 4:00 pm	(25–17, 24–26, 25–19, 26–24); P2			Batangas City Sports Center, Batangas City, Batangas; Attendance: 3,313; Referees: Patrick Castillo (PHI), Marlon Macabenta (PHI)
July 11, 2026; 4:00 pm	Scoring leaders			Batangas City Sports Center, Batangas City, Batangas; Attendance: 3,313; Referees: Patrick Castillo (PHI), Marlon Macabenta (PHI)
Deloria (24/75)		Total	Tubino (12/41)
Deloria (22/55)		Attack	Tubino (11/29)
2 players, 2 each		Block	Paat-Rezanova (2/11)
2 players, 2 each		Serve	3 players, 1 each

July 11, 2026; 6:30 pm	Choco Mucho Flying Titans	0–3	Zus Coffee Thunderbelles	Batangas City Sports Center, Batangas City, Batangas; Attendance: 3,509; Referees: Fernando Velarde (PHI), Erlindo Eusebio (PHI)
July 11, 2026; 6:30 pm	(14–25, 20–25, 23–25); P2			Batangas City Sports Center, Batangas City, Batangas; Attendance: 3,509; Referees: Fernando Velarde (PHI), Erlindo Eusebio (PHI)
July 11, 2026; 6:30 pm	Scoring leaders			Batangas City Sports Center, Batangas City, Batangas; Attendance: 3,509; Referees: Fernando Velarde (PHI), Erlindo Eusebio (PHI)
Viray (12/36)		Total	Arroyo (9/29)
Viray (11/24)		Attack	Arroyo (8/19)
4 players, 1 each		Block	2 players, 3 each
Encarnacion (1/9)		Serve	2 players, 1 each

July 25, 2026; 4:00 pm	Nxled Chameleons	3–0	Capital1 Solar Spikers	Chavit Coliseum, Vigan, Ilocos Sur; Attendance: 2,670; Referees: Ryan Vincent Corpuz (PHI), Francis Rabago (PHI)
July 25, 2026; 4:00 pm	(25–17, 25–23, 25–18); P2			Chavit Coliseum, Vigan, Ilocos Sur; Attendance: 2,670; Referees: Ryan Vincent Corpuz (PHI), Francis Rabago (PHI)
July 25, 2026; 4:00 pm	Scoring leaders			Chavit Coliseum, Vigan, Ilocos Sur; Attendance: 2,670; Referees: Ryan Vincent Corpuz (PHI), Francis Rabago (PHI)
Pablo (17/56)		Total	Adorador (6/39)
Pablo (12/38)		Attack	Genesis (5/13)
Pablo (4/12)		Block	Nunag (2/6)
Sabete-Escamillan (2/21)		Serve	Adorador (1/11)

July 25, 2026; 6:30 pm	PLDT High Speed Hitters	3–1	Choco Mucho Flying Titans	Chavit Coliseum, Vigan, Ilocos Sur; Attendance: 2,886; Referees: Erlindo Eusebio (PHI), Ryan Vincent Corpuz (PHI)
July 25, 2026; 6:30 pm	(25–21, 20–25, 29–27, 25–18); P2			Chavit Coliseum, Vigan, Ilocos Sur; Attendance: 2,886; Referees: Erlindo Eusebio (PHI), Ryan Vincent Corpuz (PHI)
July 25, 2026; 6:30 pm	Scoring leaders			Chavit Coliseum, Vigan, Ilocos Sur; Attendance: 2,886; Referees: Erlindo Eusebio (PHI), Ryan Vincent Corpuz (PHI)
Dy (17/71)		Total	Viray (16/72)
Dy (16/41)		Attack	Viray (15/60)
Davison (3/14)		Block	Madayag (2/17)
3 players, 1 each		Serve	Ubaldo (2/13)

August 1, 2026; 4:00 pm	Nxled Chameleons	3–0	Galeries Tower Highrisers	Polomolok Gymnasium, Polomolok, South Cotabato; Attendance: 2,651; Referees: Erlindo Eusebio (PHI), Joven Racelis (PHI)
August 1, 2026; 4:00 pm	(25–23, 25–23, 25–20); P2			Polomolok Gymnasium, Polomolok, South Cotabato; Attendance: 2,651; Referees: Erlindo Eusebio (PHI), Joven Racelis (PHI)
August 1, 2026; 4:00 pm	Scoring leaders			Polomolok Gymnasium, Polomolok, South Cotabato; Attendance: 2,651; Referees: Erlindo Eusebio (PHI), Joven Racelis (PHI)
Pablo (14/47)		Total	Deloria (13/49)
Pablo (13/30)		Attack	Deloria (13/37)
2 players, 2 each		Block	J. Asis (5/15)
Cayuna (1/11)		Serve	Victoria (1/5)

August 1, 2026; 6:30 pm	Akari Chargers	3–1	Choco Mucho Flying Titans	Polomolok Gymnasium, Polomolok, South Cotabato; Attendance: 2,990; Referees: Bobby Celso (PHI), Joven Racelis (PHI)
August 1, 2026; 6:30 pm	(27–25, 27–25, 21–25, 25–22); P2			Polomolok Gymnasium, Polomolok, South Cotabato; Attendance: 2,990; Referees: Bobby Celso (PHI), Joven Racelis (PHI)
August 1, 2026; 6:30 pm	Scoring leaders			Polomolok Gymnasium, Polomolok, South Cotabato; Attendance: 2,990; Referees: Bobby Celso (PHI), Joven Racelis (PHI)
Tagaod (19/44)		Total	Mendrez (16/67)
Lacsina (12/50)		Attack	Viray (14/44)
Tagaod (6/11)		Block	Madayag (3/18)
2 players, 2 each		Serve	Mendrez (3/17)

August 8, 2026; 4:00 pm	Zus Coffee Thunderbelles	v	PLDT High Speed Hitters	Santiago City Sports Arena, Santiago, Isabela

- August 8 matches were cancelled due to Tropical Depression Maymay:

August 8, 2026; 6:30 pm	Capital1 Solar Spikers	v	Creamline Cool Smashers	Santiago City Sports Arena, Santiago, Isabela

- August 8 matches were cancelled due to Tropical Depression Maymay:

August 15, 2026; 4:00 pm	Farm Fresh Foxies	3–0	Nxled Chameleons	Mindanao Civic Center, Tubod, Lanao del Norte; Attendance: 2,383; Referees: Ryan Vincent Corpuz (PHI), Marlon Macabenta (PHI)
August 15, 2026; 4:00 pm	(25–23, 25–13, 25–22); P2			Mindanao Civic Center, Tubod, Lanao del Norte; Attendance: 2,383; Referees: Ryan Vincent Corpuz (PHI), Marlon Macabenta (PHI)
August 15, 2026; 4:00 pm	Scoring leaders			Mindanao Civic Center, Tubod, Lanao del Norte; Attendance: 2,383; Referees: Ryan Vincent Corpuz (PHI), Marlon Macabenta (PHI)
Molina (16/43)		Total	Pablo (8/31)
Tubu (15/30)		Attack	Phillips (7/20)
2 players, 2 each		Block	2 players, 2 each
Meneses (2/13)		Serve	Cayuna (2/12)

August 15, 2026; 6:30 pm	PLDT High Speed Hitters	3–1	Akari Chargers	Mindanao Civic Center, Tubod, Lanao del Norte; Attendance: 2,907; Referees: Fernando Velarde (PHI), Ryan Vincent Corpuz (PHI)
August 15, 2026; 6:30 pm	(25–14, 26–24, 21–25, 25–20); P2			Mindanao Civic Center, Tubod, Lanao del Norte; Attendance: 2,907; Referees: Fernando Velarde (PHI), Ryan Vincent Corpuz (PHI)
August 15, 2026; 6:30 pm	Scoring leaders			Mindanao Civic Center, Tubod, Lanao del Norte; Attendance: 2,907; Referees: Fernando Velarde (PHI), Ryan Vincent Corpuz (PHI)
Davison (22/61)		Total	Nisperos (12/44)
Davison (19/39)		Attack	Nisperos (9/26)
2 players, 2 each		Block	2 players, 1 each
3 players, 1 each		Serve	2 players, 2 each

August 22, 2026; 4:00 pm	Capital1 Solar Spikers	2–3	Farm Fresh Foxies	Victorias City Coliseum, Victorias City, Negros Occidental; Attendance: 3,042; Referees: Joffer Educado (PHI), Justine Navidad (PHI)
August 22, 2026; 4:00 pm	(25–20, 19–25, 25–22, 12–25, 10–15); P2			Victorias City Coliseum, Victorias City, Negros Occidental; Attendance: 3,042; Referees: Joffer Educado (PHI), Justine Navidad (PHI)
August 22, 2026; 4:00 pm	Scoring leaders			Victorias City Coliseum, Victorias City, Negros Occidental; Attendance: 3,042; Referees: Joffer Educado (PHI), Justine Navidad (PHI)
Adorador (14/62)		Total	Tubu (24/64)
Adorador (14/44)		Attack	Tubu (21/44)
2 players, 3 each		Block	Galang (3/9)
Genesis (2/7)		Serve	Galang (3/15)

August 22, 2026; 6:30 pm	Galeries Tower Highrisers	0–3	Creamline Cool Smashers	Victorias City Coliseum, Victorias City, Negros Occidental; Attendance: 5,010; Referees: Patrick Castillo (PHI), Justine Navidad (PHI)
August 22, 2026; 6:30 pm	(21–25, 16–25, 21–25); P2			Victorias City Coliseum, Victorias City, Negros Occidental; Attendance: 5,010; Referees: Patrick Castillo (PHI), Justine Navidad (PHI)
August 22, 2026; 6:30 pm	Scoring leaders			Victorias City Coliseum, Victorias City, Negros Occidental; Attendance: 5,010; Referees: Patrick Castillo (PHI), Justine Navidad (PHI)
Asis J. (9/45)		Total	Valdez (10/34)
Asis J. (8/20)		Attack	Valdez (8/21)
3 players, 1 each		Block	Panaga (3/6)
4 players, 1 each		Serve	5 players, 1 each
