= List of Premier Volleyball League arenas =

The Premier Volleyball League (PVL) plays its matches across multiple venues. As the PVL's teams represent companies rather than locations, there is no need for a home-and-away format. Most matches are played in venues in Metro Manila, including the Smart Araneta Coliseum, SM Mall of Asia Arena, PhilSports Arena, and the Playtime Filoil Centre. There are also occasional matches played outside of the region, which are part of the PVL on Tour.

During the 2021 PVL season, the league held its first season as a professional league at PCV Socio-Civic & Cultural Center in Bacarra, Ilocos Norte. This was held in a bubble due to the height of the COVID-19 pandemic. In the following 2022 Open Conference, the preliminary round matches were held at Paco Arena in Manila in the same bubble format as the last conference. Starting from the playoffs of said conference, the league officially started reaccepting live audiences to watch the matches.

== Maps ==
Current PVL venues in Metro Manila	Current PVL on Tour venues in Northern and Central Luzon	Current PVL on Tour venues in Calabarzon	Current PVL on Tour venues in Visayas	Current PVL on Tour venues in Mindanao

== Main arenas ==
Image	Arena	Location	Capacity
	Smart Araneta Coliseum	Quezon City	25,000
	SM Mall of Asia Arena	Pasay	20,000
	Ynares Center	Antipolo, Rizal	12,000
	PhilSports Arena	Pasig	10,000
	Ninoy Aquino Stadium	Manila	6,000
	Playtime Filoil Centre	San Juan	5,000

== PVL on Tour ==
Image	Arena	Location	Capacity	Latest match
	Alonte Sports Arena	Biñan, Laguna	6,500	
	Aquilino Q. Pimentel Jr. International Convention Center	Cagayan de Oro	7,400	November 18, 2023 (PLDT High Speed Hitters vs. Creamline Cool Smashers)
	Batangas City Sports Coliseum	Batangas City, Batangas	4,000	June 29, 2025 (Choco Mucho Flying Titans vs. Nxled Chameleons)
	Bren Z. Guiao Convention Center	San Fernando, Pampanga	3,000	
	Candon City Arena	Candon, Ilocos Sur	5,000	July 29, 2025 (Choco Mucho Flying Titans vs. Petro Gazz Angels)
	Capital Arena	Ilagan, Isabela	10,000	July 13, 2025 (Choco Mucho Flying Titans vs. PLDT High Speed Hitters)
	Chavit Coliseum	Vigan, Ilocos Sur	9,000	June 23, 2025 (Creamline Cool Smashers vs. Akari Chargers)
	City of Dasmariñas Arena	Dasmariñas, Cavite	5,000	August 2, 2025 (Chery Tiggo Crossovers vs. Galeries Tower Highrisers)
	City of Passi Arena	Passi, Iloilo	2,000	February 22, 2025 (Chery Tiggo Crossovers vs. Choco Mucho Flying Titans)
	Iloilo Sports Complex	Iloilo City	7,000	
	Imus City Sports Complex	Imus, Cavite	1,000	
	La Salle Coliseum	Bacolod	8,000	October 13, 2019 (Petro Gazz Angels vs. Creamline Cool Smashers)
	Malolos Sports and Convention Center	Malolos, Bulacan	5,000	
	Minglanilla Sports Complex	Minglanilla, Cebu	4,000	December 7, 2024 (Capital1 Solar Spikers vs. Galeries Tower Highrisers)
	Santa Rosa Sports Complex	Santa Rosa, Laguna	5,700	September 6, 2024 (Cignal HD Spikers vs. Farm Fresh Foxies)
	Tuguegarao City People's Gym	Tuguegarao, Cagayan		
	University of San Agustin (University of San Agustin Gymnasium)	Iloilo City	3,000	December 2, 2023 (Creamline Cool Smashers vs. Cignal HD Spikers)
	University of San Jose–Recoletos (Basak Coliseum)	Cebu City	4,000	July 27, 2025 (Farm Fresh Foxies vs. Nxled Chameleons)

== PVL Bubble ==
Arena	Location	Capacity
PCV Socio-Civic & Cultural Center	Bacarra, Ilocos Norte	
Paco Arena	Manila	1,000

== See also ==
- List of Philippine Basketball Association arenas
- List of MPBL arenas
