= List of Philippine Basketball Association arenas =

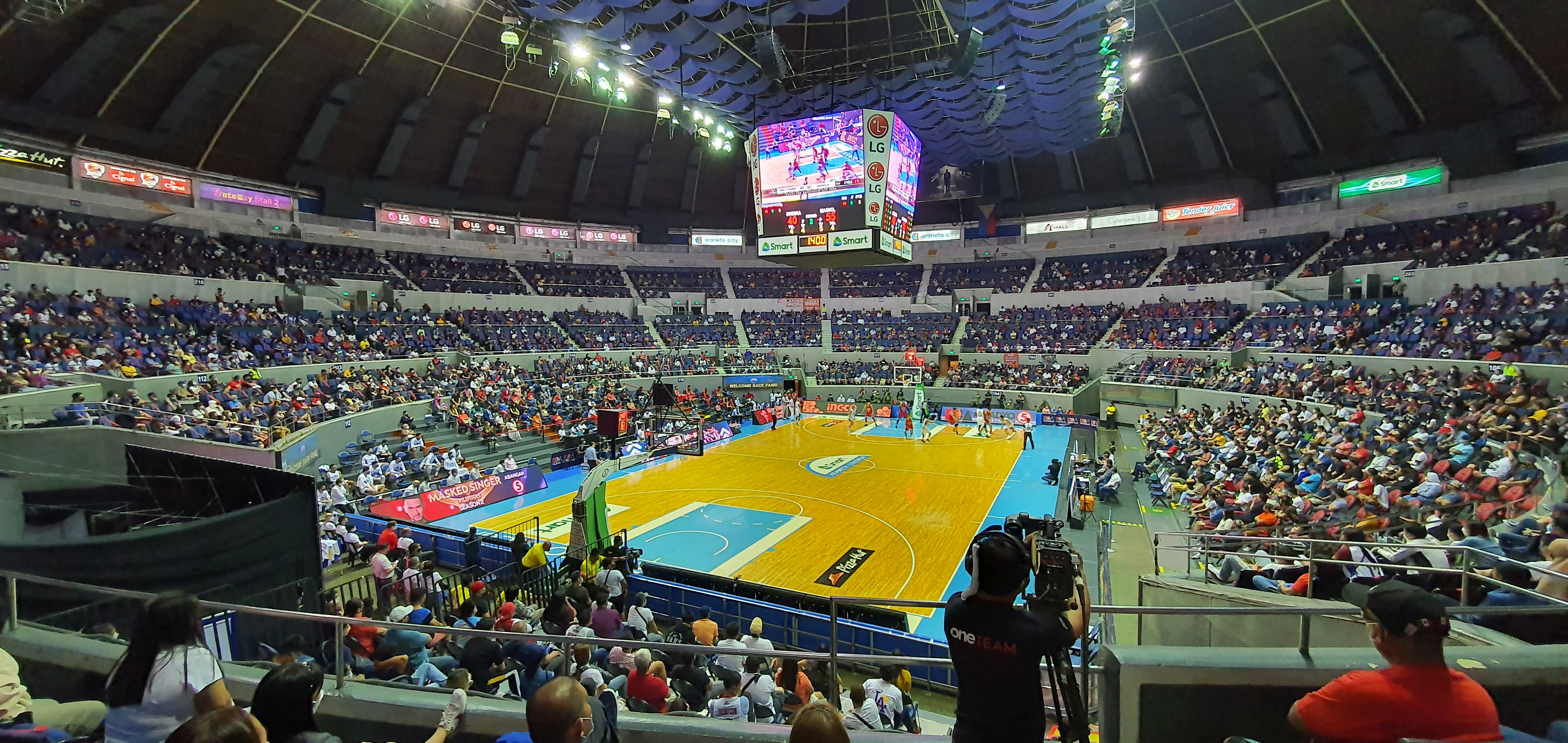
A PBA game held at Araneta Coliseum in 2021.

The Philippine Basketball Association (PBA) plays its games across multiple venues, a majority of which are played within Metro Manila. The PBA has two major venues: the Smart Araneta Coliseum in Quezon City and the SM Mall of Asia Arena in Pasay. There are also alternative venues within Metro Manila that used by the league whenever neither major venue is unavailable.

The league also occasionally schedules out-of-town games that are played outside of Metro Manila, mostly on Saturdays. The league's All-Star festivities are normally held out-of-town.

== Background ==
Unlike other leagues elsewhere, most sports leagues in the Philippines, with some recent exceptions, are held in a central location. PBA teams are company teams and represent companies and not localities. The PBA itself rents different arenas and gymnasiums in Metro Manila and Antipolo to play a great majority of its games. The PBA reserves a single playing day (usually Saturday) for games hosted by venues outside Metro Manila. The PBA has also sought to build its own arena, with plans dating back to the 2000s.

== Maps ==
Current PBA venues in Metro Manila.	PBA venues in Luzon since 2010.	PBA venues in Visayas since 2010.	PBA venues in Mindanao since 2010.

== Main arenas ==
Listed below are the frequently-used arenas in the PBA, which are mostly located in Metro Manila and Rizal.

Image	Arena	Location	Capacity
	SM Mall of Asia Arena	Pasay	15,000
	Araneta Coliseum	Quezon City	14,429
	PhilSports Arena	Pasig	10,000
	Ynares Center II	Rodriguez, Rizal	8,000
	Ynares Center	Antipolo, Rizal	7,400
	Ninoy Aquino Stadium	Manila	6,000

== Other Metro Manila arenas ==
Listed below are arenas located in Metro Manila that are used by the league occasionally, as well as arenas that had been frequently used in the past.

Image	Arena	Location	Latest game
	Caloocan Sports Complex	Caloocan	April 27, 2024 (Blackwater Bossing vs. NorthPort Batang Pier)
	Cuneta Astrodome	Pasay	November 6, 2019 (Phoenix Pulse Fuel Masters vs. Magnolia Hotshots Pambansang Manok)
	JCSGO Christian Academy (JCSGO Gym)	Quezon City	October 16, 2008 (Alaska Aces vs. Red Bull Barako)
	Muntinlupa Sports Center	Muntinlupa	March 14, 2009 (Talk 'N Text Tropang Texters vs. Burger King Whoppers)
	Olivarez College (Olivarez Sports Center)	Parañaque	November 27, 2008 (Barangay Ginebra Kings vs. Coca-Cola Tigers)
	Playtime Filoil Centre	San Juan	December 10, 2024 (San Miguel Beermen vs. Rain or Shine Elasto Painters)
	Quadricentennial Pavilion	Manila	November 16, 2025 (Phoenix Fuel Masters vs. Barangay Ginebra San Miguel)
	Rizal Memorial Coliseum	Manila	April 9, 2025 (Meralco Bolts vs. San Miguel Beermen)
	Ynares Sports Arena	Pasig	May 4, 2024 (Blackwater Bossing vs. Phoenix Fuel Masters)

== Luzon ==
=== Elimination round games ===
Image	Arena	Location	Latest game
	Alonte Sports Arena	Biñan, Laguna	October 27, 2018 (Rain or Shine Elasto Painters vs. San Miguel Beermen)
	Albay Astrodome	Legazpi, Albay	November 11, 2006 (Air21 Express vs. Red Bull Barako)
	AUF Sports and Cultural Center	Angeles City	November 11, 2020 (Phoenix Super LPG Fuel Masters vs. Rain or Shine Elasto Painters)
	Araullo University (Araullo Gym)	Cabanatuan, Nueva Ecija	March 24, 2007 (Talk 'N Text Phone Pals vs. Welcoat Dragons)
	Bataan People's Center	Balanga, Bataan	December 17, 2005 (Talk 'N Text Phone Pals vs. Alaska Aces)
	Batangas City Sports Center	Batangas City, Batangas	December 21, 2024 (Converge FiberXers vs. Barangay Ginebra San Miguel)
	Bren Z. Guiao Convention Center	San Fernando, Pampanga	May 10, 2025 (Converge FiberXers vs. Barangay Ginebra San Miguel)
	Calasiao Sports Complex	Calasiao, Pangasinan	January 26, 2019 (Barangay Ginebra San Miguel vs. Rain or Shine Elasto Painters)
	Candon City Arena	Candon, Ilocos Sur	May 24, 2025 (Magnolia Chicken Timplados Hotshots vs. NorthPort Batang Pier)
	Chavit Coliseum	Vigan, Ilocos Sur	October 18, 2025 (Converge FiberXers vs. TNT Tropang 5G)
	De La Salle Lipa (La Salle SENTRUM)	Lipa, Batangas	May 3, 2008 (Magnolia Beverage Masters vs. Red Bull Barako)
	Pampanga State University (formerly DHVSU) (Dr. Ernesto T. Nicdao Sports Center)	Bacolor, Pampanga	September 25, 2021 (Barangay Ginebra San Miguel vs. Phoenix Super LPG Fuel Masters)
	FPJ Arena	San Jose, Batangas	December 9, 2023 (Phoenix Super LPG Fuel Masters vs. Barangay Ginebra San Miguel)
	Ibalong Centrum for Recreation	Legazpi, Albay	January 13, 2024 (Barangay Ginebra San Miguel vs. NLEX Road Warriors)
	Ilocos Norte Centennial Arena	Laoag, Ilocos Norte	February 11, 2011 (Barangay Ginebra Kings vs. Meralco Bolts)
	Josefina T. Albano Sports Center	Cabagan, Isabela	October 26, 2006 (Coca-Cola Tigers vs. Barangay Ginebra Kings)
	Naga City Coliseum	Naga, Camarines Sur	March 2, 2013 (GlobalPort Batang Pier vs. San Mig Coffee Mixers)
	Pacoy Ortega Gym	San Fernando, La Union	October 21, 2006 (Purefoods Chunkee Giants vs. Sta. Lucia Realtors)
	Philippine Arena	Bocaue, Bulacan	February 18, 2018 (Meralco Bolts vs. Barangay Ginebra San Miguel)
	Puerto Princesa Coliseum	Puerto Princesa	April 9, 2016 (Tropang TNT vs. Mahindra Enforcer)
	Quezon Convention Center	Lucena	October 13, 2018 (Barangay Ginebra San Miguel vs. Rain or Shine Elasto Painters)
	San Sebastian College – Recoletos de Cavite (Recoletos 4th Centennial Gymnasium)	Cavite City, Cavite	December 8, 2007 (Red Bull Barako vs. Magnolia Beverage Masters)
	San Luis Gym	Santa Cruz, Laguna	November 26, 2004 (Shell Turbo Chargers vs. San Miguel Beermen)
	Santa Rosa Multi-Purpose Complex	Santa Rosa, Laguna	September 29, 2019 (Alaska Aces vs. San Miguel Beermen)
	Subic Gym	Subic, Zambales	April 1, 2007 (Alaska Aces vs. Purefoods Tender Juicy Giants)
	Tiaong Convention Center	Tiaong, Quezon	April 20, 2024 (Rain or Shine Elasto Painters vs. Magnolia Chicken Timplados Hotshots)
	University of the Assumption (University of the Assumption Gym)	San Fernando, Pampanga	October 28, 2006 (Sta. Lucia Realtors vs. Talk 'N Text Phone Pals)
	Urdaneta Sports Center	Urdaneta, Pangasinan	March 25, 2006 (San Miguel Beermen vs. Red Bull Barako)

=== Playoff games ===
Image	Arena	Location	Latest game
	AUF Sports and Cultural Center	Angeles City	December 9, 2020, 2020 PBA Philippine Cup finals (TNT Tropang Giga vs. Barangay Ginebra San Miguel)
	Batangas City Sports Center	Batangas City, Batangas	October 4, 2017, 2017 PBA Governors' Cup Semifinals (TNT KaTropa vs. Barangay Ginebra San Miguel)
	Dasmariñas Arena	Dasmariñas, Cavite	November 3, 2026, 2026 PBA Governors' Cup Quarterfinals (Barangay Ginebra San Miguel vs. San Miguel Beermen)
	Pampanga State University (formerly DHVSU) (Dr. Ernesto T. Nicdao Sports Center)	Bacolor, Pampanga	October 29, 2021, 2021 PBA Philippine Cup finals (Magnolia Pambansang Manok Hotshots vs. TNT Tropang Giga)
	FPJ Arena	San Jose, Batangas	May 31, 2024, 2024 PBA Philippine Cup Semifinals (Meralco Bolts vs. Barangay Ginebra San Miguel)
	Philippine Arena	Bocaue, Bulacan	January 15, 2023, 2022–23 PBA Commissioner's Cup finals (Barangay Ginebra San Miguel vs. Bay Area Dragons)
	Puerto Princesa Coliseum	Puerto Princesa	May 1, 2011, 2011 PBA Commissioner's Cup finals (Talk 'N Text Tropang Texters vs. Barangay Ginebra Kings)
	Quezon Convention Center	Lucena	January 10, 2020, 2019 PBA Governors' Cup finals (Barangay Ginebra San Miguel vs. Meralco Bolts)
	Santa Rosa Multi-Purpose Complex	Santa Rosa, Laguna	September 27, 2024, 2024 PBA Governors' Cup Quarterfinals (NLEX Road Warriors vs. TNT Tropang Giga)

== Visayas ==
=== Elimination round games ===
Image	Arena	Location	Latest game
	Calape Sports Center	Calape, Bohol	May 11, 2008 (Alaska Aces vs. Purefoods Tender Juicy Giants)
	Capiz Gymnasium	Roxas, Capiz	October 27, 2007 (Barangay Ginebra Kings vs. Welcoat Dragons)
	Cebu Coliseum	Cebu City	November 17, 2013 (Meralco Bolts vs. Talk 'N Text Tropang Texters)
	City of Passi Arena	Passi, Iloilo	September 22, 2018 (TNT KaTropa vs. Rain or Shine Elasto Painters)
	Hoops Dome	Lapu-Lapu City, Cebu	November 9, 2019 (San Miguel Beermen vs. Rain or Shine Elasto Painters)
	Lamberto Macias Sports and Cultural Center	Dumaguete, Negros Oriental	May 19, 2018 (Alaska Aces vs. San Miguel Beermen)
	Ormoc Superdome	Ormoc, Leyte	December 10, 2005 (Air21 Express vs. Barangay Ginebra Kings)
	Tacloban Convention Center	Tacloban, Leyte	March 3, 2012 (B-Meg Llamados vs.Air21 Express)
	University of San Agustin (University of San Agustin Gym)	Iloilo City, Iloilo	January 6, 2024 (Magnolia Chicken Timplados Hotshots vs. Meralco Bolts)
	USLS Coliseum	Bacolod	June 6, 2015 (Rain or Shine Elasto Painters vs. Talk 'N Text Tropang Texters)
	Victorias City Coliseum	Victorias, Negros Occidental	October 27, 2012 (Talk 'N Text Tropang Texters vs. Rain or Shine Elasto Painters)
	West Negros University (West Negros University Gym)	Bacolod	December 15, 2007 (Purefoods Tender Juicy Giants vs. Air21 Express)

=== Playoff games ===
Image	Arena	Location	Latest game
	Bago Cultural Center	Bago, Negros Occidental	May 19, 1999 1999 All-Filipino Cup Semifinals (Barangay Ginebra Kings vs. Formula Shell Zoom Masters)
	Ormoc Superdome	Ormoc, Leyte	May 30, 1999 1999 PBA All-Filipino Cup finals (Tanduay Rhum Masters vs. Formula Shell Zoom Masters)
	Victorias City Coliseum	Victorias, Negros Occidental	January 22, 2011 2010–11 PBA Philippine Cup finals (San Miguel Beermen vs. Talk 'N Text Tropang Texters)

== Mindanao ==
=== Elimination round games ===
Image	Arena	Location	Latest game
	Aquilino Q. Pimentel Jr. International Convention Center	Cagayan de Oro	November 15, 2025 (Rain or Shine Elasto Painters vs. TNT Tropang 5G)
	Arturo S. Lugod Gym	Gingoog, Misamis Oriental	March 27, 2010 (Coca-Cola Tigers vs. San Miguel Beermen)
	Davao del Sur Coliseum	Digos, Davao del Sur	February 9, 2019 (Barangay Ginebra San Miguel vs. Blackwater Elite)
	Dipolog Sports Center	Dipolog, Zamboanga del Norte	May 16, 2015 (Barangay Ginebra San Miguel vs. Blackwater Elite)
	Father Saturnino Urios University (Fr. Urios Gym)	Butuan	May 19, 2007 (Barangay Ginebra Kings vs. Talk 'N Text Phone Pals)
	Holy Cross of Davao Gym	Davao City	May 6, 2006 (Barangay Ginebra Kings vs. Sta. Lucia Realtors)
	Lagao Gymnasium	General Santos	April 8, 2005 (San Miguel Beermen vs. Purefoods Tender Juicy Hotdogs)
	Mayor Vitaliano D. Agan Coliseum	Zamboanga City	April 26, 2025 (Magnolia Chicken Timplados Hotshots vs. Phoenix Fuel Masters)
	Mindanao Civic Center	Tubod, Lanao del Norte	March 25, 2017 (Star Hotshots vs. GlobalPort Batang Pier)
	Panabo Multi-Purpose Tourism, Cultural, and Sports Center	Panabo, Davao del Norte	September 7, 2024 (Meralco Bolts vs. Magnolia Chicken Timplados Hotshots)
	Summit Centre	Zamboanga City	March 12, 2000 (Purefoods Tender Juicy Hotdogs vs. Barangay Ginebra Kings)
	University of Southeastern Philippines (USeP Gymnasium)	Davao City	November 16, 2019 (TNT KaTropa vs. Magnolia Hotshots Pambansang Manok)
	Xavier University – Ateneo de Cagayan (Xavier University Gym)	Cagayan de Oro	July 13, 2019 (Rain or Shine Elasto Painters vs. San Miguel Beermen)

=== Playoff games ===
Image	Arena	Location	Latest game
	Davao del Sur Coliseum	Digos, Davao del Sur	January 20, 2012 2011–12 PBA Philippine Cup finals (Powerade Tigers vs. Talk 'N Text Tropang Texters)
	Mindanao Civic Center	Tubod, Lanao del Norte	August 10, 2011 2011 PBA Governors' Cup finals (Petron Blaze Boosters vs. Talk 'N Text Tropang Texters)

== International ==
Image	Arena	Location	Latest game
	Khalifa Sports City Arena	(Bahrain) Isa Town	December 17, 2025 (Rain or Shine Elasto Painters vs. Barangay Ginebra San Miguel)
	University of Guam Fieldhouse	(Guam) Mangilao	September 29, 2006 (Alaska Aces vs. Red Bull Barako)
	Queen Elizabeth Stadium	Hong Kong	March 19, 2006 (Talk 'N Text Phone Pals vs. Purefoods Chunkee Giants)
	Britama Sports Mall	(Indonesia) Jakarta	March 8, 2005 (Talk 'N Text Phone Pals vs. Shell Turbo Chargers)
	Singapore Indoor Stadium	Singapore	November 30, 2008 (San Miguel Beermen vs. Talk 'N Text Tropang Texters)
	Al-Ahli Sports Club	(United Arab Emirates) Dubai	April 14, 2007 (Barangay Ginebra Kings vs. Purefoods Tender Juicy Giants)
	Al Shabab Al Arabi Sports Club	(United Arab Emirates) Dubai	May 22, 2015 (Rain or Shine Elasto Painters vs. Barangay Ginebra San Miguel)
	Al Wasl Sports Club	(United Arab Emirates) Dubai	November 7, 2015 (Alaska Aces vs. Barangay Ginebra San Miguel)
	Coca-Cola Arena	(United Arab Emirates) Dubai	October 26, 2025 (San Miguel Beermen vs. Barangay Ginebra San Miguel)

== See also ==
- List of MPBL arenas
- List of Premier Volleyball League arenas
