= Premier Volleyball League on Tour =

Series of out-of-town Premier Volleyball League games

- Upcoming season or competition: 2026 Premier Volleyball League on Tour
- Sport: Volleyball
- Founded: 2025; 1 year ago (as a distinct full tournament)
- First season: 2025
- Most recent champion: PLDT High Speed Hitters (2025)

The Premier Volleyball League on Tour (shortened as PVL on Tour and known since 2026 as the PVL on Tour Showdown) is a series of matches hosted by the Premier Volleyball League outside of Metro Manila.

The Tour was originally held as a series of exhibition games in 2017 before being integrated into the regular schedule. In 2025, it became its own tournament held as part of the league's preseason, before returning to its roots in 2026 with a more experimental ruleset.

== As a series ==
=== 2017 season (exhibition series) ===
From October 8 to 18, 2017, a series of eight exhibition games were played as part of the inaugural PVL on Tour. The series started at Tuguegarao City People's Gym followed by stops at Batangas City Sports Center and Iloilo Sports Complex before concluding at La Salle Coliseum. Another batch of matches were played in December 17 at the Santa Rosa Sports Complex.

Date	Time	Venue		Score		Set 1	Set 2	Set 3	Set 4	Set 5	Total	Report
Oct. 8, 2017	18:00	Tuguegarao People's Gym	Creamline Cool Smashers	3–1	Pocari Sweat Lady Warriors	25–19	29–27	23–25	25–22		102–93	
Oct. 8, 2017	19:30	Tuguegarao People's Gym	BanKo Perlas Spikers	3–2	BaliPure Purest Water Defenders	25–27	22–25	25–16	25–19	16–14	113–101	
Oct. 15, 2017	18:00	Batangas City Sports Center	BanKo Perlas Spikers	2–3	Creamline Cool Smashers	25–17	25–18	17–25	23–25	17–19	107–104	
Oct. 15, 2017	19:30	Batangas City Sports Center	BaliPure Purest Water Defenders	2–3	Pocari Sweat Lady Warriors	25–17	25–27	25–16	24–26	5–15	104–101	
Oct. 17, 2017	16:30	Iloilo Sports Complex	Pocari Sweat Lady Warriors	3–2	Philippine Air Force Jet Spikers	25–20	25–21	16–25	23–25	15–10	104–101	
Oct. 17, 2017	18:00	Iloilo Sports Complex	Creamline Cool Smashers	1–3	BanKo Perlas Spikers	21–25	25–22	7–25	14–25		67–97	
Oct. 18, 2017	16:30	La Salle Coliseum	Pocari Sweat Lady Warriors	1–3	Creamline Cool Smashers	23–25	25–23	16–25	16–25		80–98	
Oct. 18, 2017	18:00	La Salle Coliseum	BanKo Perlas Spikers	3–1	Philippine Air Force Jet Spikers	20–25	25–11	25–16	25–17		95–69	
Dec. 17, 2017	14:00	Santa Rosa Sports Complex	Adamson Lady Falcons	3–1	San Sebastian Lady Stags	18–25	25–21	25–23	25–23	–	93–92	
Dec. 17, 2017	16:00	Santa Rosa Sports Complex	Philippine Air Force Jet Spikers	3–2	Pocari Sweat Lady Warriors	25–18	22–25	20–25	25–16	15–9	107–93	
Dec. 17, 2017	18:00	Santa Rosa Sports Complex	BanKo Perlas Spikers	1–3	FEU Lady Tamaraws	26–24	24–26	22–25	23–25	–	95–100	

=== 2018 season ===
In the lead up to the 2018 Reinforced Conference, the league hosted another pair of Tour matches, this time taking place at the Bren Z. Guiao Convention Center in San Fernando, Pampanga.

Match results

- All times are in Philippines Standard Time (UTC+08:00)

Date	Time	Venue		Score		Set 1	Set 2	Set 3	Set 4	Set 5	Total	Report
Mar 25	18:00	Bren Z. Guiao Convention Center	Petro Gazz Angels	0–3	Chooks-to-Go Tacloban Fighting Warays	20–25	23–25	21–25	–	–	64–75	
Mar 25	18:30	Bren Z. Guiao Convention Center	Creamline Cool Smashers	3–0	BPI Globe BanKo Perlas Spikers	25–17	25–13	25–14	–	–	75–44	

=== 2019 season ===
Three stops were held for the Reinforced Conference with the University of San Agustin, Imus City Sports Complex, and Alonte Sports Arena serving as venues. Another three were made for the succeeding Open Conference, with stops at Malolos Sports and Convention Center, University of San Agustin, and La Salle Coliseum.

Date	Time	Venue		Score		Set 1	Set 2	Set 3	Set 4	Set 5	Total	Report
Jun. 15, 2019	16:00	University of San Agustin	BanKo Perlas Spikers	0–3	Creamline Cool Smashers	12–25	19–25	16–25			47–75	P2
Jun. 16, 2019	14:00	Imus City Sports Complex	BaliPure Purest Water Defenders	0–3	Petro Gazz Angels	19–25	22–25	18–25			59–75	P2
Jun. 16, 2019	16:00	Imus City Sports Complex	Motolite Power Builders	3–2	PacificTown–Army Lady Troopers	25–23	21–25	17–25	25–21	15–13	103–107	P2
Jun. 23, 2019	14:00	Alonte Sports Arena	BanKo Perlas Spikers	3–2	Motolite Power Builders	19–25	23–25	25–18	25–22	17–15	109–105	P2
Jun. 23, 2019	16:00	Alonte Sports Arena	PacificTown–Army Lady Troopers	0–3	Petro Gazz Angels	27–29	20–25	14–25			61–79	P2
Sep. 21, 2019	14:00	Malolos Convention Center	Chef's Classics Lady Red Spikers	2–3	Choco Mucho Flying Titans	34–32	12–25	25–23	18–25	11–15	100–120	P2
Sep. 21, 2019	16:00	Malolos Convention Center	BaliPure Purest Water Defenders	0–3	PacificTown-Army Lady Troopers	17–25	22–25	18–25			57–75	P2
Oct. 5, 2019	14:00	University of San Agustin	Petro Gazz Angels	3–2	PacificTown-Army Lady Troopers	25–15	20–25	14–25	25–13	15–7	99–85	P2
Oct. 5, 2019	16:00	University of San Agustin	Creamline Cool Smashers	3–0	Choco Mucho Flying Titans	25–15	25–15	25–16			75–46	P2
Oct. 13, 2019	14:00	La Salle Coliseum	PacificTown-Army Lady Troopers	2–3	BanKo Perlas Spikers	27–25	20–25	22–25	25–21	9–15	103–111	P2
Oct. 13, 2019	16:00	La Salle Coliseum	Petro Gazz Angels	1–3	Creamline Cool Smashers	21–25	24–26	25–19	18–25		88–95	P2

=== 2023 season ===
As COVID-19 pandemic restrictions eased, the PVL on Tour returned in the First All-Filipino Conference with a doubleheader at the University of San Agustin in Iloilo City.

In the Second All-Filipino Conference, the PVL on Tour featured four stops: Batangas City Sports Center, Candon City Arena, Aquilino Q. Pimentel Jr. International Convention Center, and ending with a return to the University of San Agustin.

Date	Time	Venue		Score		Set 1	Set 2	Set 3	Set 4	Set 5	Total	Report
Mar. 14, 2023	16:00	University of San Agustin	Chery Tiggo Crossovers	0–3	Petro Gazz Angels	21–25	26–28	21–25			68–78	P2
Mar. 14, 2023	18:00	University of San Agustin	Akari Power Chargers	1–3	Creamline Cool Smashers	17–25	22–25	29–27	8–25		76–102	P2
Oct. 21, 2023	16:00	Batangas City Sports Center	Petro Gazz Angels	3–0	Quezon City Gerflor Defenders	25–11	25–4	25–23			75–38	P2
Oct. 21, 2023	18:00	Batangas City Sports Center	Creamline Cool Smashers	3–0	Cignal HD Spikers	25–20	25–20	25–16			75–56	P2
Oct. 28, 2023	16:00	Candon City Arena	Galeries Tower Highrisers	0–3	F2 Logistics Cargo Movers	15–25	22–25	17–25			54–75	P2
Oct. 28, 2023	18:00	Candon City Arena	Nxled Chameleons	0–3	Petro Gazz Angels	23–25	21–25	22–25			66–75	P2
Nov. 18, 2023	14:00	CDO Convention Center	Quezon City Gerflor Defenders	0–3	Akari Chargers	18–25	15–25	19–25			52–75	P2
Nov. 18, 2023	16:00	CDO Convention Center	PLDT High Speed Hitters	0–3	Creamline Cool Smashers	23–25	21–25	19–25			63–75	P2
Dec. 2, 2023	16:00	University of San Agustin	Nxled Chameleons	3–1	Farm Fresh Foxies	25–22	17–25	25–20	25–17		92–84	P2
Dec. 2, 2023	18:00	University of San Agustin	Chery Tiggo Crossovers	0–3	Choco Mucho Flying Titans	16–25	19–25	23–25			58–75	P2

=== 2024–25 season ===
In the All-Filipino Conference, the PVL on Tour was held across three venues: Candon City Arena, City of Passi Arena, and Minglanilla Sports Complex.

Date	Time	Venue		Score		Set 1	Set 2	Set 3	Set 4	Set 5	Total	Report
Nov. 23, 2024	16:00	Candon City Arena	Petro Gazz Angels	3–0	Farm Fresh Foxies	25–21	25–17	25–19			75–57	P2
Nov. 23, 2024	18:30	Candon City Arena	Akari Chargers	0–3	Creamline Cool Smashers	24–26	17–25	16–25			57–76	P2
Dec. 07, 2024	16:00	Minglanilla Sports Complex	Nxled Chameleons	0–3	Cignal HD Spikers	18–25	22–25	23–25			63–75	P2
Dec. 07, 2024	18:30	Minglanilla Sports Complex	Capital1 Solar Spikers	0–3	Galeries Tower Highrisers	24–26	14–25	23–25			61–76	P2
Feb. 22, 2025	16:00	City of Passi Arena	Zus Coffee Thunderbelles	0–3	PLDT High Speed Hitters	20–25	16–25	15–25			51–75	P2
Feb. 22, 2025	18:30	City of Passi Arena	Chery Tiggo Crossovers	0–3	Choco Mucho Flying Titans	18–25	23–25	24–26			65–76	P2

=== 2026–27 season ===
The PVL on Tour preseason tournament will return for the 2026–27 season. The tour started on July 8, 2026 in Ilagan, Isabela. On August 7, 2026, the Santiago, Isabela matches were cancelled due to Tropical Depression Maymay.

Date	Time	Venue		Score		Set 1	Set 2	Set 3	Set 4	Set 5	Total	Report
Jul. 8, 2026	16:00	Capital Arena	Zus Coffee Thunderbelles	3–1	Akari Chargers	25–11	25–23	26–28	25–17		101–79	P2
Jul. 8, 2026	18:30	Capital Arena	Creamline Cool Smashers	3–1	Nxled Chameleons	25–18	25–23	16–25	25–19		91–85	P2
Jul. 11, 2026	16:00	BCSC	Galeries Tower Highrisers	3–1	Farm Fresh Foxies	25–17	24–26	25–19	26–24		100–86	P2
Jul. 11, 2026	18:30	BCSC	Choco Mucho Flying Titans	0–3	Zus Coffee Thunderbelles	14–25	20–25	23–25			57–75	P2
Jul. 25, 2026	16:00	Chavit Coliseum	Nxled Chameleons	3–0	Capital1 Solar Spikers	25–17	25–23	25–18			75–58	P2
Jul. 25, 2026	18:30	Chavit Coliseum	PLDT High Speed Hitters	3–1	Choco Mucho Flying Titans	25–21	20–25	29–27	25–18		99–91	P2
Aug. 1, 2026	16:00	Polomolok Gymnasium	Nxled Chameleons	3–0	Galeries Tower Highrisers	25–23	25–23	25–20			75–66	P2
Aug. 1, 2026	18:30	Polomolok Gymnasium	Akari Chargers	3–1	Choco Mucho Flying Titans	27–25	27–25	21–25	25–22		100–97	P2
Aug. 8, 2026	16:00	SCSA	Zus Coffee Thunderbelles	–	PLDT High Speed Hitters	–	–	–			0–0	
Aug. 8, 2026	18:30	SCSA	Capital1 Solar Spikers	–	Creamline Cool Smashers	–	–	–			0–0	
Aug. 15, 2026	16:00	Mindanao Civic Center	Farm Fresh Foxies	3–0	Nxled Chameleons	25–23	25–13	25–22			75–58	P2
Aug. 15, 2026	18:30	Mindanao Civic Center	PLDT High Speed Hitters	3–1	Akari Chargers	25–14	26–24	21–25	25–20		97–83	P2
Aug. 22, 2026	16:00	Victorias City Coliseum	Capital1 Solar Spikers	2–3	Farm Fresh Foxies	25–20	19–25	25–22	12–25	10–15	91–107	P2
Aug. 22, 2026	18:30	Victorias City Coliseum	Galeries Tower Highrisers	0–3	Creamline Cool Smashers	21–25	16–25	21–25			58–75	P2

== As a tournament ==
=== 2025–26 season ===
Due to the Philippines' hosting of the 2025 FIVB Men's Volleyball World Championship, the PVL on Tour returned to being an exhibition series and was expanded into its own preseason tournament, doubling as a qualifier for that season's Invitational Conference. The tournament featured games held at Chavit Coliseum, Batangas City Sports Center, Ynares Center II, Capital Arena, City of Passi Arena, University of San Jose–Recoletos, Candon City Arena, and City of Dasmariñas Arena.
