= 2025–26 Petro Gazz Angels season =

Seventh season of the Petro Gazz Angels

The 2025–26 Petro Gazz Angels season was the seventh and final season of the Petro Gazz Angels in the Premier Volleyball League (PVL).

Following from their All-Filipino title, the Angels had a subpar performance in the preseason PVL on Tour. They would only win two of their five preliminary round matches, giving them seven points in the process. During the conference, Koji Tsuzurabara resigned from his position as head coach, with Brian Esquibel taking over in an interim role. In the knockout round, the team lost to the Galeries Tower Highrisers, putting an end to their preseason journey.

For the Reinforced Conference, Petro Gazz brought back Lindsey Vander Weide from their 2022 Reinforced Conference title run to as their foreign guest player. Additionally, Gary and Lisa Van Sickle, the parents of Brooke Van Sickle, joined the Petro Gazz coaching staff. Gary would take on the role on head coach while Lisa would join as an assistant.

== Roster ==
Petro Gazz Angels roster
No.	Nat.	Player	Pos.	Height	DOB	From
1	(Philippines)	Antonette Adolfo	Opposite Hitter	1.70 m (5 ft 7 in)	March 23, 2001 (age 25)	Adamson
2	(Philippines)	Djanel Cheng	Setter	1.70 m (5 ft 7 in)	August 28, 1994 (age 31)	St. Benilde
4	(Philippines)	Julyana Tolentino	Setter	1.87 m (6 ft 2 in)	July 8, 2002 (age 24)	De La Salle
5	(Philippines)	Joy Dacoron	Middle Blocker	1.80 m (5 ft 11 in)	October 11, 1995 (age 30)	Adamson
7	(Philippines)	Jellie Tempiatura	Libero	1.57 m (5 ft 2 in)	July 24, 1997 (age 28)	Adamson
8	(Philippines)	Aiza Maizo-Pontillas	Opposite Hitter	1.78 m (5 ft 10 in)	February 29, 1988 (age 38)	UST
9	(Philippines)	Remy Palma (C)	Middle Blocker	1.77 m (5 ft 10 in)	September 8, 1995 (age 30)	Far Eastern
10	(Philippines) (United States)	Brooke Van Sickle	Outside Hitter	1.75 m (5 ft 9 in)	March 22, 1999 (age 27)	Hawaiʻi
11	(United States)	Lindsey Vander Weide	Outside Hitter	1.91 m (6 ft 3 in)	October 19, 1997 (age 28)	Oregon
13	(Philippines) (United States)	Mar-Jana Phillips	Middle Blocker	1.82 m (6 ft 0 in)	June 15, 1995 (age 31)	Juniata
15	(Philippines)	Myla Pablo	Outside Hitter	1.78 m (5 ft 10 in)	September 12, 1993 (age 32)	National-U
16	(Philippines)	Ranya Musa	Middle Blocker	1.80 m (5 ft 11 in)	February 13, 1997 (age 29)	St. Benilde
17	(Philippines)	Chie Saet	Setter	1.64 m (5 ft 5 in)	November 24, 1984 (age 41)	De La Salle
19	(Philippines)	Nicole Tiamzon	Outside Hitter	1.68 m (5 ft 6 in)	November 3, 1995 (age 30)	Philippines
20	(Philippines)	Jonah Sabete	Outside Hitter	1.70 m (5 ft 7 in)	January 29, 1994 (age 32)	Bulacan State
21	(Philippines)	Bang Pineda	Libero	1.60 m (5 ft 3 in)	January 21, 1991 (age 35)	Adamson

Coaching staff

- Head coach:
  Gary Van Sickle
- Assistant coach:
  Brian Esquibel
  Stephen James Patrona
  Jay Chua
  Ramona Bagatsing
  Cha Cruz-Behag
  Lisa Van Sickle
  Billie Anima
- Conditioning Coach:
  Paolo Rivero

Team staff

- Team Coordinator:
  Evelyn Dris
- Team Manager:
  David Dichupa

Medical staff

- Physical Therapist:
  Karen Cathleen Adubal
  Fe Marie Joy Accordon

=== National team players ===
Players who were part of the Philippines women's national team were excluded from playing with the team due to various commitments. This affected the team's roster for the PVL on Tour.

- MJ Phillips
- Brooke Van Sickle

== Draft ==
Round	Pick	Player	Pos.	School
1	11	Julyana Tolentino	S	De La Salle

== PVL on Tour ==
=== Preliminary round ===
==== Pool A standings ====
Pos	Team	Pld	W	L	Pts	SW	SL	SR	SPW	SPL	SPR	Qualification
2	Nxled Chameleons	5	4	1	11	12	6	2.000	408	381	1.071	Final round
3	Farm Fresh Foxies	5	3	2	9	9	7	1.286	359	371	0.968	Knockout round
4	Petro Gazz Angels	5	2	3	7	8	10	0.800	390	406	0.961	Knockout round
5	Choco Mucho Flying Titans	5	1	4	3	7	13	0.538	439	481	0.913	Knockout round
6	Galeries Tower Highrisers	5	0	5	0	1	15	0.067	335	386	0.868	Knockout round

Source: PVL.ph

==== Match log ====
2025 PVL on Tour preliminary round match log
Total: 2–3 (7 points)
June: 1–1 (4 points)

Match	Date	Opponent	Sets	Total	Location Attendance	Record	Pts	Report
1	June 28, 2025	Nxled	2–3	98–103	Batangas City Sports Center; 2,157	0–1	1	P2
2	June 29, 2025	Galeries Tower	3–0	76–68	Batangas City Sports Center; 2,345	1–1	4	P2

July: 1–2 (3 points)

Match	Date	Opponent	Sets	Total	Location Attendance	Record	Pts	Report
3	July 12, 2025	PLDT	0–3	53–75	Capital Arena; 6,448	1–2	4	P2
4	July 13, 2025	Farm Fresh	0–3	67–75	Capital Arena; 5,507	1–3	4	P2
5	July 29, 2025	Choco Mucho	3–1	96–85	Candon City Arena; 3,919	2–3	7	P2

=== Knockout round ===
==== Match log ====
2025 PVL on Tour knockout round match log
Total: 0–1 (0 points)
Knockout round: 0–1 (0 points)

Date	Opponent	Sets	Total	Location Attendance	Report
August 5, 2025	Akari	0–3	71–82	PhilSports Arena; 706	P2

== Reinforced Conference ==
=== Preliminary round ===
==== Standings ====
Pos	Team	Pld	W	L	Pts	SW	SL	SR	SPW	SPL	SPR	Qualification
3	PLDT High Speed Hitters	8	6	2	18	19	9	2.111	669	591	1.132	Quarterfinals
4	Creamline Cool Smashers	8	5	3	17	20	12	1.667	729	661	1.103	Quarterfinals
5	Petro Gazz Angels	8	5	3	14	17	14	1.214	718	669	1.073	Quarterfinals
6	Cignal Super Spikers	8	5	3	13	16	14	1.143	672	650	1.034	Quarterfinals
7	Capital1 Solar Spikers	8	4	4	13	16	14	1.143	660	688	0.959	Quarterfinals

Source: Premier Volleyball League

==== Match log ====
2025 PVL Reinforced Conference preliminary round match log
Total: 5–3 (14 points)
First round: 3–2 (8 points)

Match	Date	Opponent	Sets	Total	Location Attendance	Record	Pts	Report
1	October 9, 2025	Galeries Tower	3–0	75–54	City of Dasmariñas Arena; 461	1–0	3	P2
2	October 14, 2025	Creamline	1–3	86–92	Smart Araneta Coliseum; 2,085	1–1	3	P2
3	October 18, 2025	Chery Tiggo	3–1	95–84	Capital Arena; 6,000	2–1	6	P2
4	October 23, 2025	Akari	3–2	105–110	Filoil Centre; 1,241	3–1	8	P2
5	October 28, 2025	Zus Coffee	0–3	63–75	Filoil Centre; 1,200	3–2	8	P2

Second round: 2–1 (6 points)

Match	Date	Opponent	Sets	Total	Location Attendance	Record	Pts	Report
6	November 11, 2025	Farm Fresh	1–3	94–99	Filoil Centre; 387	3–3	8	P2
7	November 15, 2025	Capital1	3–1	100–63	Ynares Center Montalban; 810	4–3	11	P2
8	November 20, 2025	PLDT	3–1	100–92	SM Mall of Asia Arena; 1,274	5–3	14	P2

=== Final round ===
==== Bracket ====
Quarterfinals
November 24
Farm Fresh	0
Akari	3
November 24
Creamline	1
Petro Gazz	3
November 24
Zus Coffee	3
Capital1	0
November 24
PLDT	3
Cignal	1

Semifinals
November 27
Akari	2
Petro Gazz	3
November 27
Zus Coffee	3
PLDT	0

Championship
November 30
Petro Gazz	3
Zus Coffee	1
3rd-place match
November 30
Akari	3
PLDT	2

==== Match log ====
2024–25 PVL All-Filipino Conference final round match log
Total: 3–0 (6 points)
Quarterfinals: 1–0 (3 points)

Date	Opponent	Sets	Total	Location Attendance	Report
November 24, 2025	Creamline	3–1	91–81	Smart Araneta Coliseum	P2

Semifinals: 1–0 (3 points)

Date	Opponent	Sets	Total	Location Attendance	Report
November 27, 2025	Akari	3–2	102–99	Smart Araneta Coliseum	P2

Championship: 1–0 (3 points)

Date	Opponent	Sets	Total	Location Attendance	Report
November 30, 2025	Zus Coffee	3–1	99–94	Smart Araneta Coliseum	P2

== Transactions ==
=== Additions ===
Player	Date signed	Previous team	Ref.
Pauline de Guzman	June 26, 2025	Arellano Lady Chiefs (NCAA)	
Bang Pineda	July 28, 2025	Nxled Chameleons	

=== Subtractions ===
Player	New team	Ref.
Ethan Arce	Nxled Chameleons	
Kecelyn Galdones	Capital1 Solar Spikers	
Michelle Morente	Creamline Cool Smashers	
