= List of MPBL arenas =

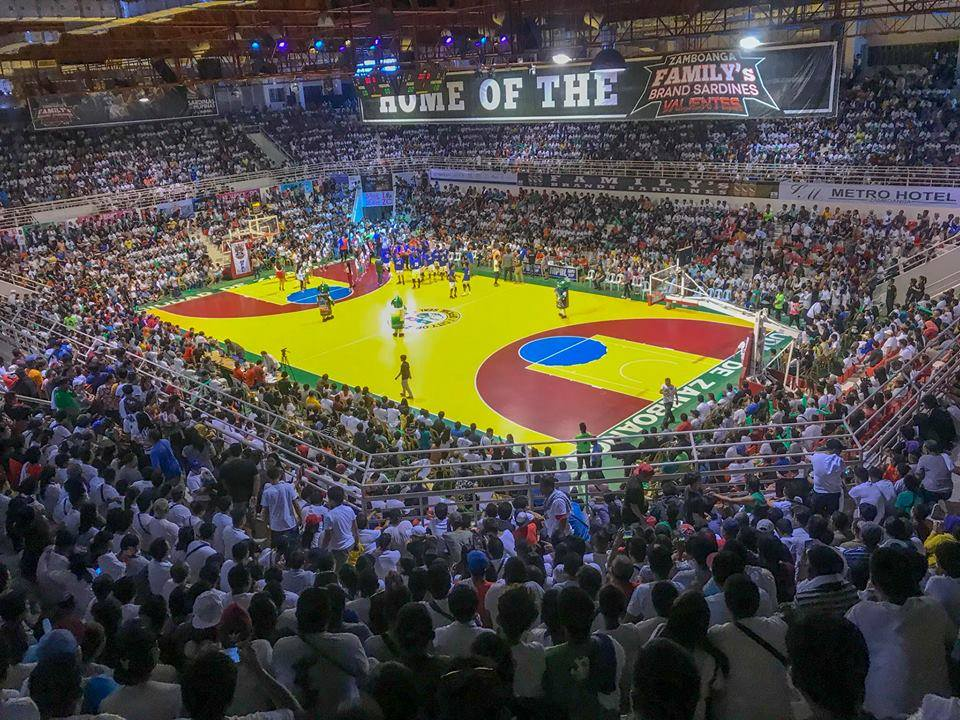
An MPBL game held at Mayor Vitaliano D. Agan Coliseum in 2018.

In the Maharlika Pilipinas Basketball League (MPBL), games are played in various venues across the country. This list includes all venues the MPBL has used for their games. Every team in the league has a designated home venue that is used throughout the season, and is where the team plays its home games. The final game of each gameday, the primetime game, usually has the host team participating in the game.

Similar to the Philippine Basketball Association (PBA), the MPBL schedules out-of-town gamedays as part of the Invasion series. These games are normally played in Visayas and Mindanao. Invasion games are also played in Luzon whenever the league plays far from the Greater Manila Area.

In this list, most on-campus venues are listed with the name of the institution it is based in, with the actual name of the venue being placed in parentheses. Additionally, for each venue, teams are listed under the name when they last used it.

== Maps ==
Locations of venues in Metro Manila	Locations of venues in Northern and Central Luzon	Locations of venues in Southern Luzon	Locations of venues in Mindanao

== 2025 season ==
The following venues are set to be used during the 2025 season. Bold indicates a new venue for this season. Italics indicate a former tenant.

Image	Venue	Location	Team(s)	Capacity	Ref.
	Bataan People's Center	Balanga, Bataan	Bataan Risers	4,000	
	Batangas City Sports Coliseum	Batangas City, Batangas	Batangas City Tanduay Rum Masters	4,000	
	FPJ Arena	San Jose, Batangas	Batangas City Tanduay Rum Masters	3,000	
	Alonte Sports Arena	Biñan, Laguna	Biñan Tatak Gel	6,500	
	Caloocan Sports Complex	Caloocan	Caloocan Batang Kankaloo	3,000	
	**Capital Arena**	Ilagan, Isabela	Ilagan Isabela Cowboys	10,000	
	Paco Arena	Manila	Manila Batang Quiapo	1,000	
	**Rizal Memorial Coliseum**	Manila	Manila Batang Quiapo	6,100	
	San Andres Sports Complex	Manila	Manila Batang Quiapo	3,000	
	Marikina Sports Center	Marikina	Marikina Shoemasters	7,000	
	Pola Gymnasium	Pola, Oriental Mindoro	Mindoro Tamaraws	N/A	
	Nueva Ecija Coliseum	Palayan, Nueva Ecija	Nueva Ecija Rice Vanguards	3,000	
	Bren Z. Guiao Convention Center	San Fernando, Pampanga	Pampanga Giant Lanterns	3,000	
	Calasiao Sports Complex	Calasiao, Pangasinan	Pangasinan Heatwaves	3,000	
	**Robert B. Estrella Sr. Memorial Stadium**	Rosales, Pangasinan	Pangasinan Heatwaves	N/A	
	Olivarez College (Olivarez College Gymnasium)	Parañaque	Parañaque Patriots	3,500	
	Cuneta Astrodome	Pasay	Pasay Voyagers	12,000	
	Ynares Sports Arena	Pasig	Pasig City; Makati Super Crunch	3,000	
	Quezon Convention Center	Lucena, Quezon	Quezon Huskers	7,000	
	Ynares Center Montalban	Rodriguez, Rizal	Rizal Golden Coolers	8,000	
	Playtime Filoil Centre	San Juan	San Juan Knights	6,000	
	WES Arena	Valenzuela	Val City Magic	N/A	

== 2024 season ==
The following venues were used during the 2024 season, the most recent completed season to date. Italics indicate a former tenant.

Image	Venue	Location	Team(s)	Capacity	Ref.
	University of Abra (Gov. Andres B. Bernos Memorial Gymnasium)	Bangued, Abra	Abra Solid North Weavers	N/A	
	Orion Sports Complex	Orion, Bataan	Bataan Risers	N/A	
	AUF Sports and Cultural Center	Angeles City	Pampanga Giant Lanterns	2,000	
	Villar Coliseum	Las Piñas	Parañaque Patriots	N/A	
	Lucena Convention Center	Lucena, Quezon	Quezon Huskers	N/A	
	Amoranto Arena	Quezon City	Quezon City Galeries Taipan	3,500	
	Ynares Center Antipolo	Antipolo, Rizal	Rizal Golden Coolers	7,400	
	Mayor Vitaliano D. Agan Coliseum	Zamboanga City	Zamboanga Sikat	12,000	
	Strike Gymnasium	Bacoor, Cavite	Bacoor City Strikers	1,500	

== Former venues ==
The following venues were used during previous seasons.

Image	Venue	Location	Team(s)	Capacity	Ref.
	La Salle Coliseum	Bacolod	Bacolod City of Smiles; Negros Muscovados	8,000	
	Lamitan Capitol Gym	Lamitan, Basilan	Basilan Starhorse	3,000	
	Batangas State University (Batangas State University Gymnasium)	Batangas City, Batangas	Batangas City Embassy Chill	2,500	
	De La Salle Lipa (De La Salle Lipa SENTRUM)	Lipa, Batangas	Batangas City Embassy Chill	1,000	
	Albay Astrodome	Legazpi, Albay	Bicol Volcanoes	5,000	
	Ibalong Centrum for Recreation	Legazpi, Albay	Bicol Volcanoes	8,000	
	Baliwag Star Arena	Baliwag, Bulacan	Bulacan Kuyas	5,000	
	Bulacan Capitol Gymnasium	Malolos, Bulacan	Bulacan Kuyas	5,000	
	Malolos Sports and Convention Center	Malolos, Bulacan	Bulacan Kuyas	5,000	
	Southwestern University (Aznar Coliseum)	Cebu City	Cebu Casino Ethyl Alcohol	7,000	
	University of San Jose–Recoletos (Basak Coliseum)	Cebu City	Cebu Casino Ethyl Alcohol	4,000	
	Hoops Dome	Lapu-Lapu City	Cebu Casino Ethyl Alcohol	6,500	
	University of Southeastern Philippines (USeP Gymnasium and Cultural Center)	Davao City	Davao Occidental Tigers	6,000	
	RMC Petro Gazz Arena	Davao City	Davao Occidental Tigers	2,000	
	Davao City Recreation Center	Davao City	Davao Occidental Tigers	2,500	
	Davao del Norte Sports Complex	Tagum, Davao del Norte	Davao Occidental Tigers	N/A	
	University of San Agustin (University of San Agustin Gymnasium)	Iloilo City	Iloilo United Royals	5,000	
	Passi City Arena	Passi, Iloilo	Iloilo United Royals	2,000	
	Imus Sports Complex	Imus, Cavite	Imus SV Squad	1,000	
	Laguna Sports Complex	Santa Cruz, Laguna	Laguna Krah Asia	2,500	
	Santa Rosa Sports Complex	Santa Rosa, Laguna	Laguna Krah Asia	5,700	
	Makati Coliseum	Makati	Makati Super Crunch	12,000	
	José Rizal University (José Rizal University Gymnasium)	Mandaluyong	Mandaluyong El Tigre	1,000	
	Ninoy Aquino Stadium	Manila	Manila Stars	6,000	
	Marist School (Marist School Gymnasium)	Marikina	Marikina Shoemasters	2,500	
	Sentrong Pangkabataan	Calapan, Oriental Mindoro	Mindoro Disiplinados	N/A	
	Muntinlupa Sports Center	Muntinlupa	Muntinlupa Cagers	3,000	
	Navotas Sports Complex	Navotas	Navotas Uni-Pak Sardines	1,000	
	Pasig Sports Center	Pasig	Pasig Sta. Lucia Realtors	2,500	
	Blue Eagle Gym	Quezon City	Quezon City Capitals	7,500	
	JCSGO Christian Academy (JCSGO Seed Dome)	Quezon City	Quezon City Capitals	1,000	
	Trinity University of Asia (Henry Noble Gymnasium)	Quezon City	Quezon City Capitals	980	
	One Arena	Cainta, Rizal	Rizal Golden Coolers	N/A	
	Sarangani Capitol Gymnasium	Alabel, Sarangani	Sarangani Marlins	N/A	
	Lagao Gymnasium	General Santos	GenSan Warriors	6,000	
	Bahayang Pag-asa Sports Complex	Valenzuela	Valenzuela XUR Homes Realty Inc.	N/A	
	Valenzuela Astrodome	Valenzuela	Valenzuela XUR Homes Realty Inc.	3,000	

== Other venues ==
The following venues have been used by the league, but don't have any primary tenants.

Image	Venue	Location	Capacity	Ref.
	El Salvador City Gymnasium	El Salvador, Misamis Oriental	N/A	
	San Jose del Monte Sports Complex	San Jose del Monte, Bulacan	N/A	
	SM Mall of Asia Arena	Pasay	15,000	
	Smart Araneta Coliseum	Quezon City	25,000	
	Subic Bay Gymnasium	Subic, Zambales	2,000	

== See also ==
- List of Philippine Basketball Association arenas
- List of Premier Volleyball League arenas
