= Maharlika Pilipinas =

Maharlika Pilipinas is a name used in multiple grassroots-based sports leagues in the Philippines founded by Manny Pacquiao, including:

- Maharlika Pilipinas Basketball League for men's basketball; founded in 2017
  - Junior Maharlika Pilipinas Basketball League for youth men's basketball; founded in 2023
  - Women's Maharlika Pilipinas Basketball League for women's basketball; founded in 2024
- Maharlika Pilipinas Volleyball Association for men's & women's volleyball; founded in 2023
- Maharlika Pilipinas Pickleball Tour for men's & women's pickleball; founded in 2026
