= FPJ Arena =

Indoor arena in San Jose, Batangas, Philippines

- Interactive map of FPJ Arena
- Location: San Jose, Batangas, Philippines
- Coordinates: 13°52′08″N 121°06′13″E
- Capacity: 3,000

Construction
- Opened: August 20, 2023

Tenants
- Philippine Basketball Association (out-of-town games); Batangas City Tanduay Rum Masters (MPBL) (2024–present)

FPJ Arena is an indoor arena located in San Jose, Batangas, Philippines. Opened in 2023, the arena named after Fernando Poe Jr. (FPJ) is one of the home venues for the Batangas City Tanduay Rum Masters of the Maharlika Pilipinas Basketball League (MPBL) and has also hosted its share of Philippine Basketball Association (PBA) games as an out-of-town venue.

== History ==
The arena opened on August 20, 2023, coinciding with the 84th birthday of deceased actor and National Artist Fernando Poe Jr., who the arena is named after. Senator Grace Poe, one of FPJ's daughters, was in attendance for the opening that day.

The arena hosted its first Philippine Basketball Association game on December 9, 2023 during the 2023–24 Commissioner's Cup, featuring the Barangay Ginebra San Miguel and Phoenix Super LPG Fuel Masters. On May 31, 2024, it hosted its first PBA playoff game, game 7 of the 2024 PBA Philippine Cup semifinals, which saw the Meralco Bolts win over Barangay Ginebra San Miguel on their way to their first-ever title. On June 11, 2024, the Batangas City Tanduay Rum Masters played their first home game in San Jose against the Biñan Tatak Gel, marking the first Maharlika Pilipinas Basketball League game at the venue and in the municipality.

On August 20, 2024, exactly one year after the arena opened, a statue of FPJ was erected in commemoration of the actor's 85th birthday with Senator Poe once again in attendance to present the statue. The statue itself was made by Jordan Mendoza from Pasig and has a height of approximately five feet and is painted in cast metal.
