= Home of the UAAP =

Indoor arena under construction in Pasig, Philippines

- Interactive map of Home of the UAAP
- Address: Amang Rodriguez Ave., Bridgetowne, Pasig, Philippines
- Coordinates: 14°35′33.9″N 121°05′16.9″E
- Owner: Akari Lighting & Technology
- Capacity: 8,074
- Type: Indoor arena

Construction
- Groundbreaking: October 24, 2025
- Opened: 2027 (projected)
- Architect: Asya Design Partner

Tenant
- University Athletic Association of the Philippines

The Home of the UAAP, also referred to as the UAAP Arena, is the tentative name for an indoor arena that is under construction in Amang Rodriguez Ave., Bridgetowne, Pasig, Philippines. The arena is part of a collaboration between the University Athletic Association of the Philippines (UAAP) and Akari Lighting & Technology, and is planned to be a "central hub" for events hosted by the UAAP.

The arena was first announced on August 20, 2024 with construction starting on October 24, 2025. Construction is expected to finish in 2027, in time for the UAAP's 90th season, and will have a capacity of 8,074.

== History ==
There have been plans to construct a neutral and dedicated venue for the University Athletic Association of the Philippines (UAAP) prior to the COVID-19 pandemic. The collegiate league initially considered a structure similar to the University of Santo Tomas' Quadricentennial Pavilion but was scrapped due to it being too expensive to fund independently.

Negotiations for venue began in March 2023 between the UAAP and Akari Lighting & Technology Corp, with Fr. Aldrin Suan, CM of Adamson University, then-president of Season 85, leading the project. The concept was made by Asya Design and was unveiled later that year in May.

The proposed venue was unveiled on August 20, 2024, at the University of the Philippines Diliman and is given the temporary name of the "Home of the UAAP". Construction of the venue was planned to begin in the fourth quarter of 2025 and is set to open in time for UAAP Season 90 in 2027.

The groundbreaking ceremony was held on October 24, 2025.

== Architecture and design ==
Asya Design Partner is responsible for the concept design of the Home of the UAAP, with Albert Yu as its principal architect. The indoor arena covers a total space of 18,000 square meters (190,000 sq ft) and is located at Bridgetowne in Pasig.

The structure of the indoor arena is inspired from an infinity symbol or an eight when turned sideways, which is a reference to the UAAP's eight member schools.

It was set to have a projected seating capacity of 6,000, which according to UAAP Executive Director Rene Saguisag Jr., is the average attendance for UAAP games. It will accommodate indoor sports but will not have facilities for aquatic sports. During the groundbreaking ceremony, it was announced that the arena's planned capacity was increased to 8,074.

== Tenants ==
As the name suggests, the Home of the UAAP will serve as the primary venue of the University Athletic Association of the Philippines (UAAP) for both the high school and collegiate level, although the league intends to use venues such as the Smart Araneta Coliseum and the SM Mall of Asia Arena for events drawing larger audiences. This includes rivalry games in men's basketball and women's basketball. The UAAP will also allow other leagues to rent the venue.

== See also ==
- Proposed Philippine Basketball Association arena
