= Proposed Philippine Basketball Association arena =

Proposed indoor arena for PBA games

Proposed PBA arena
- Address: Quezon City, Philippines
- Capacity: 8,000–10,000
- Type: Indoor arena

Construction
- Groundbreaking: To be announced

Tenant
- Philippine Basketball Association

The Philippine Basketball Association (PBA) has played its games across a variety of venues throughout its more than fifty-year long history, but the league has also sought to build an arena of its own, with proposals dating back to 2006. The current proposal, which began in 2026, will have the arena built at University of the Philippines Diliman in Quezon City.

The UP Diliman site will be five hectares in size with a seating capacity ranged between 8,000 and 10,000 spectators.

== History ==
=== Background ===
In the Philippine Basketball Association, teams are represented by the companies that own them, which differs from most leagues where teams represent locations, thus there isn't a need for each team to have a "home venue" since there is no home-and-away format. Although most games are played within Metro Manila, the venues themselves, particularly the Araneta Coliseum and SM Mall of Asia Arena, are still subject to availability due to other factors such as concerts and other leagues such as the University Athletic Association of the Philippines (UAAP) and Premier Volleyball League (PVL). It is also estimated the league spends ₱43–45 million annually in order to rent the arenas to be used for games.

=== Proposals ===
==== 2006 ====
Plans for the PBA to build its own arena were first brought up in 2006 by then-commissioner Noli Eala. In an interview with All-Star Magazine, Eala had multiple proposed locations, including Taguig (specifically the site where SM Aura would be built), Mandaluyong, and Quezon City where Eala had advanced discussions with the city government to build the arena at what is now part of Vertis North. Eala discussed with the PBA board about the arena's ownership, management, and design, but wasn't able to tackle the arena's seating capacity before he stepped down in 2007.

==== 2010 ====
Another proposal by Buddy Encarnado was brought up in 2010, though little information is known about it.

==== 2024 ====
On July 23, 2024, during a planning session for the 2024–25 PBA season, at Swissôtel Nankai Osaka in Osaka, Japan, the league once again revived plans of building its own arena. Board chairman Ricky Vargas stated that the league had found a partner to build the proposed venue while commissioner Willie Marcial added that the arena will be located in Metro Manila and be two to three hectares in size. Marcial also stated that the arena has a "70 to 75 percent chance" of it pushing through. Atty. Ogie Narvasa would lead negotiations regarding the arena.

On October 28, 2024, it was reported that Marcial began discussing with Chavit Singson, founder of LCS Holdings, for the potential site of the arena. LCS Holdings controls the Metrowalk commercial hub in Pasig at the site of the former Payanig sa Pasig amusement park. On November 16, in an interview with Eala on his Power Play radio program, Singson stated that he has "agreed in principle" for the league to build the arena at Metrowalk.

On April 11, 2025, during the league's 50th anniversary gala at Solaire Resort North. The league showed a video presentation for its plans for the coming year, during which San Miguel Beermen governor Robert Non stated that "hopefully, we would be able to hold a groundbreaking ceremony soon."

==== 2026 ====
In February 2026, Joaquin Henson of The Philippine Star reported that the PBA was seeking to build the arena within the campus of University of the Philippines Diliman, which is revealed to be five hectares in size. The goal would be for the Philippine Sports Commission and the University of the Philippines to enter a partnership for a sports and training center, with the PBA joining as a facilitator, constructing the venue and enter a revenue-sharing agreement with UP. The arena's capacity at the UP Diliman site is expected to be between 8,000 and 10,000 and will also be where UP can conduct its own events. By June 26, the league was “in serious talks” about the arena getting built, said league chairman Ricky Vargas in another interview with All-Star, adding that he was able to gain the support of PSC chairman Patrick Gregorio in the project. It was also revealed that the arena would include a practice gym, a fitness area, and a store for league merchandise.

== See also ==
- Home of the UAAP
