= Maharlika Pilipinas Basketball League =

Men's professional basketball league in the Philippines

- Current season, competition or edition: 2026 MPBL season
- Sport: Basketball
- Founded: August 29, 2017; 9 years ago
- Founder: Manny Pacquiao
- First season: 2018
- COO: Kenneth Duremdes
- Commissioner: Emmerson Oreta
- Motto: Ang Liga Ng Bawat Pilipino (The League of Every Filipino)
- No. of teams: 26
- Country: Philippines
- Headquarters: Pasig
- Continent: FIBA Asia (Asia)
- Most recent champion: Abra Solid North Weavers (1st title)
- Most titles: Pampanga Giant Lanterns (2 titles)
- Broadcasters: Solar Sports; TAP Sports
- Streaming partners: Facebook; YouTube; Blast TV
- Feeder to: East Asia Super League
- Website: https://mpbl.com.ph/

The Maharlika Pilipinas Basketball League (MPBL) is a men's regional professional basketball league in the Philippines. As of the 2026 season, the league is composed of 26 teams.

The MPBL was founded in 2017 by eight-division boxing world champion and then-Senator Manny Pacquiao to allow local players to take part in competitive basketball. The league is often referred to as a "regional league" due to its location-based format with home and away games. The league gained professional status in 2022.

Over time, the MPBL has attracted multiple prospects from the collegiate level who would go on to play in top-flight leagues such as the Philippine Basketball Association (PBA). The success of the league has also led to multiple spin-off leagues under the Maharlika Pilipinas banner. In 2026, the MPBL became the Philippines' partner league in the East Asia Super League.

The Abra Weavers are the current defending champions, beating the Quezon Huskers in three games during the 2025 MPBL finals. The Pampanga Giant Lanterns are currently the only team to win multiple championships, during so in 2023 and 2024.

== History ==
=== Background ===
Prior to the MPBL, the concept of a Philippine sports league using a home and away format had been done multiple times before. The most notable of these leagues was the Metropolitan Basketball Association of the late 1990s and early 2000s, which served as a direct competitor to the top-flight Philippine Basketball Association. High expenses and lack of funding led to the MBA ceasing operations in 2002. There was also Liga Pilipinas, formed by the merger of the Mindanao Visayas Basketball Association and National Basketball Conference. The league was part of a merger with the Philippine Basketball League to form the PBA's upcoming developmental league, but the plan fell through and the D-League launched independently.

Manny Pacquiao has pursued a professional basketball career for a few years, having played in and coached for the Kia/Mahindra franchise in the PBA. After his PBA career, he formally launched the MPBL on August 29, 2017, with the intent to feature both the commercial and barangay-level side, with teams on the commercial side to have a home locality in addition to a corporate sponsor. The plan was for the league to begin with Luzon-based teams only and then expand to Visayas and Mindanao later on. The expanded league would have two divisions, North and South, where one team from both divisions face in a finals series similar to the format of the National Basketball Association (NBA) in North America. The league was planned to start as early as September 23, 2017 with at least six teams. A preseason tournament was held with the Bulacan Kuyas finishing as champions. Snow Badua was the league's inaugural commissioner, but he did not take on the role when the first season eventually began as six-time PBA champion Kenneth Duremdes succeeded Badua as league commissioner on November 22, 2017.

=== 2018–2020: Amateur era ===
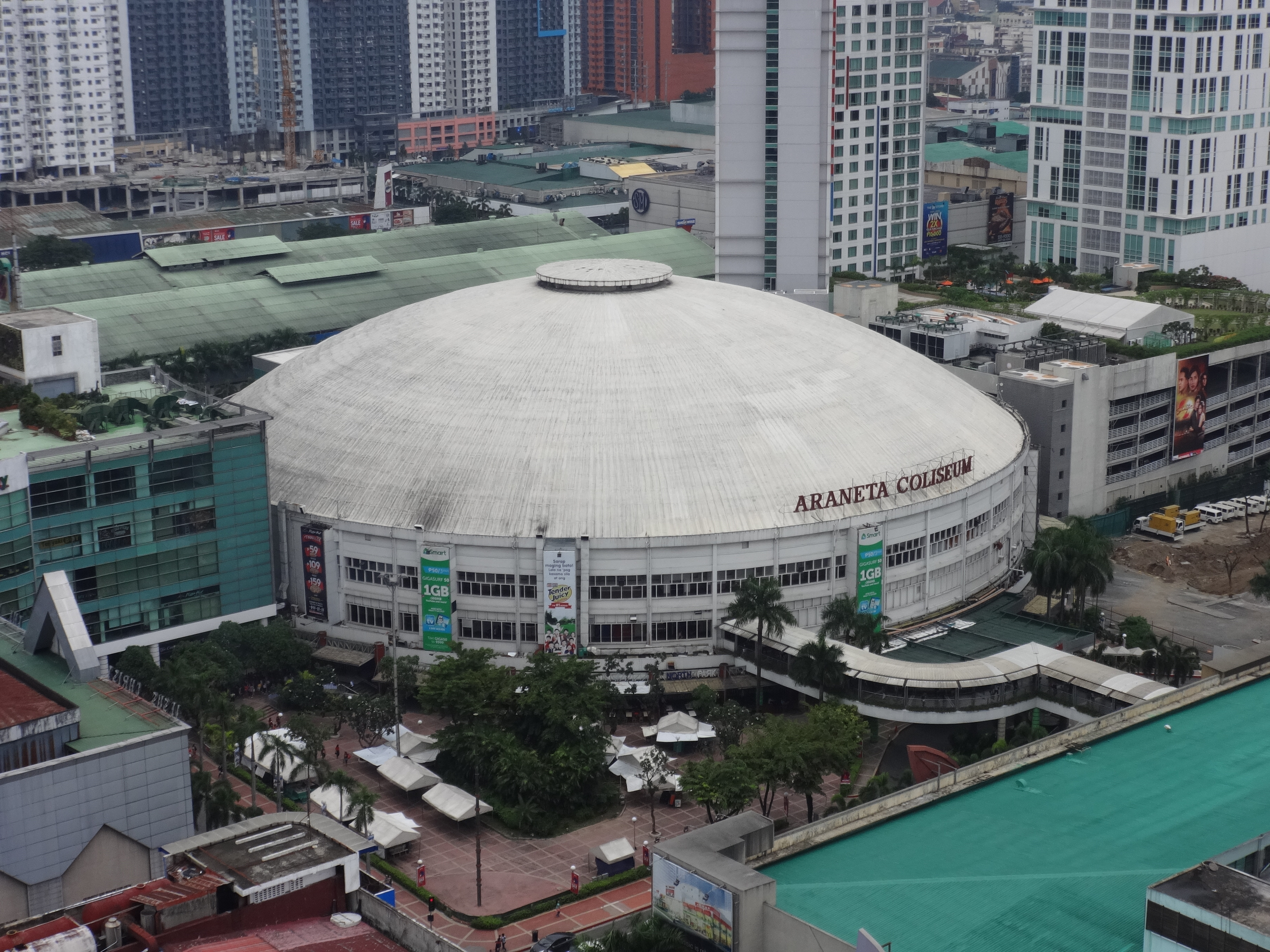
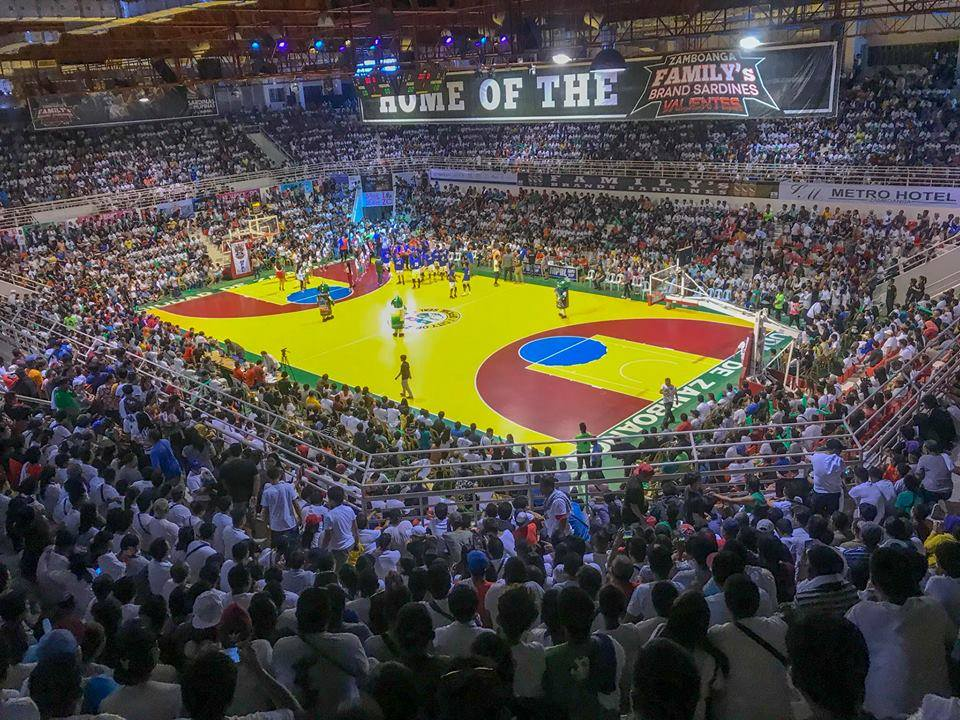
The Smart Araneta Coliseum (left) served as the venue for the league's inaugural gameday on January 25, 2018. The Mayor Vitaliano D. Agan Coliseum (right) is home to the Zamboanga Sikat, one of sixteen teams that joined during the league's national expansion.

The MPBL began its inaugural season on January 25, 2018, at the Smart Araneta Coliseum in Quezon City. The inaugural season featured ten teams, all based in Luzon, with the requirement of each team having three homegrown players. In the opening game, the Parañaque Patriots scored a 70–60 victory over the Caloocan Supremos. The playoffs only had eight teams due to the small size, concluding with the Batangas City Athletics winning the inaugural title in the 2018 finals against the Muntinlupa Cagers.

In the 2018–19 season, the league added sixteen expansion teams, bringing the total to 26 teams. Five of the sixteen expansions are based in Visayas and Mindanao, thus marking the league's national expansion. The North and South Divisions were introduced and the playoff pool doubled to sixteen teams, eight per division. The league also placed roster restrictions on teams, only allowing one Filipino-foreigner and up to five ex-professional players, intended to maintain parity and preserve the league's grassroots foundations. However, the classification of and restrictions on Filipino-foreigners was criticized by fans, coaches, and players, particularly other Filipino-foreigners including Rob Reyes and Abu Tratter. The rule would later be relaxed in future seasons. The 2018–19 season also saw the inaugural edition of the MPBL All-Star Game, which was held at the SM Mall of Asia Arena in Pasay. The San Juan Knights won the title that season against the Davao Occidental Tigers in the 2019 national finals, which is to date, the only series to go the full length of five games.

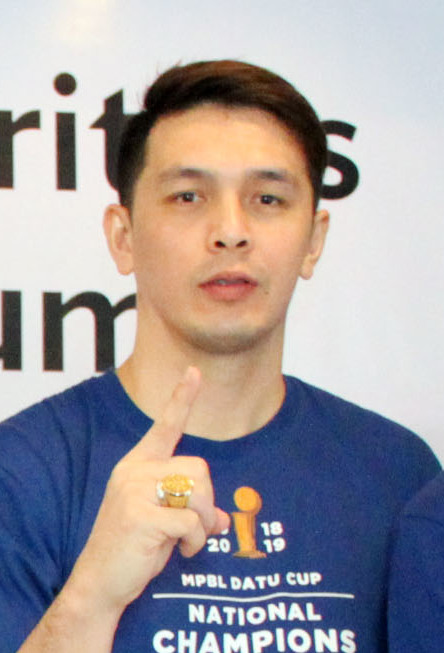
John Wilson was a key player in San Juan's 2019 championship run and, in 2020, became the first player in the league to score 1,000 points.

The following 2019–20 season featured 31 teams participating in the league, the most the league had in its history, adding six expansion teams but also saw its first departing team, the Mandaluyong El Tigre. Roster restrictions were also relaxed, allowing more Filipino-foreigners and ex-professional players to play in the league. This season also saw the debut of the International Invasion series, which saw games being played in the United Arab Emirates and in Canada.

==== 2020–2021: COVID-19 disruption ====
Due to the COVID-19 pandemic in the Philippines, the league suspended play on March 12, 2020. Nearly a year later, on March 6, 2021, the league announced the resumption of its playoffs. The remainder of the league's 2020 playoffs was held at a bubble at the Subic Bay Gymnasium. In a rematch of the 2019 national finals series, the Davao Occidental Tigers won the 2021 national finals against the San Juan Knights. Because of the restrictions imposed by the government due to the pandemic, the league's 2020–21 season would be cancelled. The league's fourth season would be postponed multiple times before it eventually began in 2022. In October 2021, Chooks-to-Go took over the league's basketball operations.

The continued suspension of league play led to some teams taking part in tournaments of the newly established FilBasket in an effort to remain competitive. This trend of teams competing in other regional leagues during the off-season continued into later seasons with the Pilipinas Super League (PSL).

=== 2021–2025: The start of the professional era ===
On November 9, 2021, it was announced that the MPBL would turn into a professional league. A month later, on December 9, 2021, the MPBL was granted professional status by the Games and Amusements Board (GAB). This also allowed the league to feature collegiate players on team rosters, as long as the player himself has a Special Guest License. The league's first professional event was the 2021 Invitational, during which all roster restrictions were lifted. The preseason tournament would later be developed with the MPBL Preseason Invitational in future seasons as a smaller pocket tournament.

As the league continued its recovery from the pandemic, it finally started its fourth season, the 2022 season, after multiple postponements and over a year after last season's conclusion. It only featured 22 teams, the smallest the league has gotten since its inaugural season. The Nueva Ecija Rice Vanguards became the first team to achieve a regular season sweep and subsequently won the 2022 national finals against the Zamboanga Family's Brand Sardines. The succeeding 2023 season featured 29 teams, which included the additions of the Negros Muscovados and Quezon Huskers. The season also marked the beginning of a trend where PBA prospects, such as Justine Baltazar, CJ Cansino, and Adrian Nocum would first play in the MPBL before eventually declaring for the draft. Similarly, PBA veterans such as the likes of Marc Pingris, Jayjay Helterbrand, and Arwind Santos also began playing in the regional league during the latter part of their playing careers. On November 7, 2023, the league launched its social arm, the MPBL Kalinga, with the goal of providing medical assistance to MPBL players, former and current, as well as league officials and staff. In October 2024, a party-list sharing the same acronym, the Maharlikang Pilipino sa Bagong Lipunan party-list, was created in an effort to extend their grassroots program into other sports. The season culminated with the homegrown-laden Pampanga Giant Lanterns sweeping the Bacoor City Strikers in the 2023 national finals.

The 2024 season also featured 29 teams and marked the start of the league's Northern Luzon expansion. The ex-professional player limit was removed, allowing teams to sign any number of professional players onto their rosters. The season culminated with the first back-to-back championship after Pampanga defeated the Quezon Huskers in three games in the 2024 MPBL finals, which also featured the league's first international games in five years.

The 2025 season features 30 teams and will see the introduction of the league's play-in tournament, a series of games to be held after the regular season and before the playoffs to determine which teams take up the final playoff spots similar to its NBA counterpart. The Northern Luzon expansion continued with the addition of the Ilagan Isabela Cowboys.

=== 2026–present: New leadership and EASL partnership ===
In January 2026, the league had its first major leadership change since starting play in 2018, with Kenneth Duremdes becoming MPBL president with Emmerson Oreta succeeding him as the league's third commissioner. The league contracted to 28 teams at the start of the season.

In April 2024, the league began exploring the possibility of joining the East Asia Super League. However, this was later refuted by EASL CEO Henry Kerins in October that year, stating that "there were no exploratory talks" while also sharing his respect for the league. Despite that, two years later on August 19, 2026, the MPBL became the EASL's new partner league in the Philippines for at least the 2026–27 EASL season. The league would be sending its most recent champions to compete.

=== Title sponsorship deals ===
In December 2019, Chooks-to-Go of Bounty Agro Ventures became the league's first title sponsor. The deal was initially set to last for five years (until December 2024), but only lasted until the 2021 Invitational. Sports betting platform OKBet, succeeded Chooks-to-Go as the league's new title sponsor in 2022 and continued into 2023. In 2025, the league signed a new title sponsorship deal with gambling company 1xbet, which supposed to last until 2026, however the sponsorship was eventually pulled out mid-season and be replaced with 747 Live during the 2025 Playoffs and all the way to the 2025 National Finals. In 2026, MPBL partners with SportsPlus as its latest title sponsor.

=== Game-fixing controversies ===
The league has been noted for its game-fixing problem, which has been one of its long-standing issues. The league began cracking down on game-fixing ahead of the 2019–20 season, a season that went on to have multiple such cases. Ahead of the 2024 season, the league banned 47 players and officials who were allegedly involved in such acts. The league has also told team owners to exclude any players and coaches who are suspected to be involved in this issue. The 2026 season saw two teams have their seasons terminated mid-season with ties to game-fixing. The returning Iloilo United Royals had their franchise revoked on June 23 after management abandoned their obligations to compete, with the league also alleging that the team had been involved in game-fixing. The Bacolod Masskara had their season cancelled on July 30 and its players and coached banned following an investigation on their scoreless run in a game against Bulacan the day prior.

== Teams ==
As of July 30, 2026, the league is composed of 26 teams. Teams are divided into two geographic divisions: the North Division and South Division. The most recent expansion team is the Ilagan Isabela Cowboys, who joined the league in 2025.

Overview of MPBL teams
Division	Team	Location			Arena	Capacity	Founded (lineage)	Joined	Head coach (Note: Teams may have two head coaches: a de facto head coach and an acting head coach. Both coaches are listed as such.)
Division	Team	Region	Province	City / Mun.	Arena	Capacity	Founded (lineage)	Joined	Head coach
North	Abra Weavers	Cordillera	Abra	Bangued	University of Abra	1,500	2024		Yong Garcia
North	Bataan Risers	Central Luzon	Bataan	Balanga; Orion	Bataan People's Center; Orion Sports Complex	4,000; 2,000	2018		Goody Ilagan
North	Bulacan Kuyas	Central Luzon	Bulacan	Baliwag; Malolos	Baliwag Star Arena Malolos Sports and Convention Center	5,000 5,000	2017	2018	Allan Salangsang
North	Caloocan Batang Kankaloo	Metro Manila	—N/a	Caloocan	Caloocan Sports Complex	3,000	2017	2018	Jerson Cabiltes
North	Ilagan Isabela Cowboys	Cagayan Valley	Isabela	Ilagan	Capital Arena	10,000	2025		Louie Gonzalez
North	Manila Batang Quiapo	Metro Manila	—N/a	Manila (Note: Despite representing the district of Quiapo, the Manila Batang Quiapo play their home games in Paco and Malate.)	San Andres Sports Complex Paco Arena	3,000 1,000	2018		Max Dayandante
North	Marikina Shoemasters	Metro Manila	—N/a	Marikina	Marikina Sports Center	7,000	2018		Angelo Nebres
North	Meycauayan Marilao Gems	Central Luzon	Bulacan	Meycauayan (Note: Despite representing Meycauayan and Marilao, the Meycauayan Marilao Gems play their home games within the Bulacan province.); Marilao	Bulacan Capitol Gymnasium San Jose del Monte Sports Complex	3,000 5,000	2018 (Note: Originally known as the Muntinlupa Cagers; relocated to southern Bulacan in 2026.)		Jonathan Banal
North	Parañaque Patriots	Metro Manila	—N/a	Parañaque	Olivarez College	3,500	2017	2018	JR Villanueva
North	Pasay Voyagers	Metro Manila	—N/a	Pasay	Cuneta Astrodome	12,000	2018		Marlon Martin
North	Pasig City	Metro Manila	—N/a	Pasig	Ynares Sports Arena	3,000	2018 (1998)	2018	Ryan De Ramos
North	Quezon City Black Bulls	Metro Manila	—N/a	Quezon City	MRB Gymnasium Novadeci Convention Center	2,000 2,000	2018		Javy Olea
North	San Juan Knights	Metro Manila	—N/a	San Juan	Playtime Filoil Centre	5,500	2018 (1999)	2018	Alexander Angeles
North	Valenzuela City Darkhorse	Metro Manila	—N/a	Valenzuela	WES Arena	1,100	2017	2018	Estong Ballesteros
South	Basilan Steel	Bangsamoro	Basilan	Lamitan	Lamitan Capitol Gymnasium	3,000	2018	2018	Arnold Oliveros
South	Batangas City Athletics	Calabarzon	Batangas	Batangas City	Batangas Province Events Center Batangas City Sports Coliseum	6,000 4,000	2018		Cholo Villanueva
South	Biñan Tatak Gel	Calabarzon	Laguna	Biñan	Alonte Sports Arena	6,500	2018		Boyet Fernandez
South	Cebu Greats	Central Visayas	Cebu (Note: The team is based in a highly urbanized city that is grouped with the listed province.)	Cebu City Lapu-Lapu	Cebu Coliseum Hoops Dome	5,000 4,600	2018	2018	Aldrin Morante
South	GenSan Warriors	Soccsksargen	South Cotabato	General Santos	Lagao Gymnasium	6,000	2018 (2005)	2018	Elvis Tolentino
South	Imus Bandera	Calabarzon	Cavite	Imus	Imus Sports Complex	1,000	2018		Britt Reroma
South	Mindoro Tamaraws	Mimaropa	Oriental Mindoro	Pola	Pola Gymnasium	N/A	2019		Bengie Teodoro
South	Negros Hacienderos	Negros Island Region	Negros Occidental	Bacolod	La Salle Coliseum	8,000	2021	2023	Kim Cinco
South	Quezon Huskers	Calabarzon	Quezon	Lucena	Quezon Convention Center Lucena Convention Center	7,000 4,000	2023 (2004)	2023	Eric Gonzales
South	Rizal Golden Coolers	Calabarzon	Rizal	Rodriguez	Ynares Center Montalban	8,000	2018		Don Dulay
South	Sarangani Marlins	Soccsksargen	Sarangani	Alabel	Sarangani Capitol Gymnasium	1,000	2019 (1998)	2019	John Kallos
South	Zamboanga Sikat	Zamboanga Peninsula	Zamboanga del Sur	Zamboanga City	Mayor Vitaliano D. Agan Coliseum	12,000	2019 (2018)	2018 (Note: The Zamboanga Sikat initially competed under the Zamboanga Valientes banner in 2018 before splitting from the latter in 2019. Should the Sikat be considered a successor to the Valientes, the team's lineage can be traced back to 2006.)	John Sia

=== Suspended teams in 2026 ===
Team	Location			Arena	Capacity	Founded	Joined
Team	Region	Province	City / Mun.	Arena	Capacity	Founded	Joined
Bacolod Masskara (Note: The Bacolod Masskara had its 2026 season cancelled due to game-fixing allegations. It is unknown if the team will return in 2027.)	Negros Island Region	Negros Occidental	Bacolod	La Salle Coliseum	8,000	2019	

=== Former teams ===
Team	Location			Arena	Capacity	Founded	Joined	Last season
Team	Region	Province	City / Mun.	Arena	Capacity	Founded	Joined	Last season
Bacoor City Strikers	Calabarzon	Cavite	Bacoor	Strike Gymnasium	1,500	2018		2023
Bicol Volcanoes	Bicol Region	Albay	Legazpi	Ibalong Centrum for Recreation	8,000	2019		2024
Davao Occidental Tigers	Davao Region	Davao del Sur (Note: Despite representing Davao Occidental, the Davao Occidental Tigers play their home games within the Metro Davao area.)	Davao City	Davao City Recreation Center	2,500	2018		2025
Iloilo United Royals	Western Visayas	Iloilo	Passi	Passi City Arena	2,000	2019		2026 (Note: The Iloilo United Royals had its franchise revoked by the league midseason due to team management's failure to abide by league regulations.)
Makati Skyscrapers	Metro Manila	—N/a	Makati	Makati Coliseum	12,000	2018		2023
Mandaluyong El Tigre	Metro Manila	—N/a	Mandaluyong	José Rizal University	1,000	2018		2019
Navotas Clutch	Metro Manila	—N/a	Navotas	Navotas Sports Complex	1,000	2018		2020
Nueva Ecija Rice Vanguards	Central Luzon	Nueva Ecija	Palayan	Nueva Ecija Coliseum	3,000	2019		2025
Pampanga Giant Lanterns	Central Luzon	Pampanga	San Fernando	Bren Z. Guiao Convention Center	3,000	2018		2025
Pangasinan Heatwaves	Ilocos Region	Pangasinan	Rosales	Robert B. Estrella Sr. Memorial Stadium	3,000	2024		2025
Tarlac United Force	Central Luzon	Tarlac	Tarlac City	Tarlac State University	N/A	2024 (Note: The Tarlac United Force were pulled by the league without playing a single game due to financial issues.)		

=== Teams per region ===
The table below shows how the league is spread across all regions in the country. As of 2025, Metro Manila has the most active teams out of any region with nine followed by Calabarzon with five, and Central Luzon with three. Negros Island Region and Soccsksargen each have two teams while every other representing region has one team. In terms of island groups, a majority of teams are based in Luzon, which has 20 teams, while Visayas and Mindanao have four each.

Eleven of the country's eighteen regions are currently being represented. Ilocos Region, Bicol Region, Western Visayas, and Davao Region had prior representation in the league. Eastern Visayas, Northern Mindanao, and Caraga are the only regions that haven't had any teams compete in the league.

Region	Season							
Region	2018	2018–19	2019–20	2022	2023	2024	2025	2026
Ilocos Region	0					1		0
Cordillera	0					1		
Cagayan Valley	0						1	
Central Luzon	2	3	4	3	4			3
Metro Manila	6	13	12	9	11	9	10	9
Calabarzon	2	5			6	5		
Mimaropa	0		1					
Bicol Region	0		1	0	1		0	
Western Visayas	0		2	1	3	1	0	0; ~~1~~
Negros Island Region	—N/a (Note: The region didn't exist during the season.)					2	1	1; ~~2~~
Central Visayas	0	1		0			1	
Zamboanga Peninsula	0	1						
Davao Region	0	1		0		1		0
Soccsksargen	0	1	2					
Bangsamoro	—N/a	1		0			1	

=== Team rivalries ===
Within just its first decade, the MPBL has already developed rivalries between its teams. Due to the league using a single round-robin format in every season thus far, the league’s rivalries mostly revolve around playoff series. Others may involve contention within the division and/or the league overall.

As of 2026, the league's only notable active rivalry is the Batangas City–Zamboanga rivalry. Both teams met in the playoffs four times in seven seasons, including three straight from 2019 to 2022 and a division finals series in 2022. Additionally, all four series went the full length. Historical rivalries include Davao Occidental–San Juan, Nueva Ecija–San Juan, Pampanga–San Juan, and Nueva Ecija–Pampanga.

== Season structure ==
=== Preseason ===
Before the regular season, the league holds a Preseason Invitational tournament, featuring a set number of teams. The tournament is divided into two phases: the group stage and the playoffs. In the group stage, the participating teams are divided into multiple groups, where each team will play against their group opponents once. The top two teams of each group advance to a single-elimination playoffs.

=== Regular season ===
The regular season utilizes a single round-robin tournament format, where each team plays against all of the other teams once, regardless of division alignment. The league uses FIBA rules for all of its games. The league uses the number of wins as its first metric for determining rankings and any ties are broken using the quotient system.

Two or three games are scheduled each day to be played in a single venue, thus a majority of the league's games are considered neutral-site games. In most cases, the home team typically plays in the final game. Should any games be postponed or suspended, most commonly due to natural disasters like typhoons, those will be moved towards the back end of the regular season and are only played if there are postseason implications.

Similar to the PBA, league also schedules series of out-of-town games throughout the regular season, known as Invasion series, where consecutive gamedays take place in areas far from the Greater Manila Area, such as Visayas and Mindanao. Invasion series also covers the league's international games.

=== All-Star Game ===
Near the end of the regular season, the league holds its seasonal All-Star Game. Two teams representing the North and South Divisions are composed of fifteen players from each division, all of whom are declared as the season's all-stars. Alongside the All-Star Game are the various festivities held at the same day, including the Executives' Game, Three-Point Shootout, and Slam Dunk Contest.

=== Play-in tournament ===
Beginning with the 2025 season, the league will feature a play-in tournament to be contested by teams ranked seventh through tenth in their respective divisions. The seventh and eighth-placed teams play to determine the seventh seed in the playoffs. The ninth and tenth-placed teams play to face the looser of the seventh place game for the last seed.

=== Playoffs ===
Since the 2018–19 season, sixteen teams advance to the playoffs, eight per division. These include the top six teams from each division as well as two qualifying teams from the play-in tournament.

In the first round or the division quarterfinals, the first seed is matched with the eighth seed, the second with the seventh, the third with the sixth, and the fourth with the fifth. The division semifinals will then have the winner of the 1–8 series match with the winner of the 4–5 series, and the winner of the 2–7 series with the winner of the 3–6 series. The winners of both series then meet in the division finals. The champions of each division will then meet in the final round, dubbed as the MPBL finals or the MPBL national finals, where the two teams play in one final series to determine the series champion. The first two rounds, the division quarterfinals and semifinals, are best-of-three series, both division finals are best-of-five, and the national finals is best-of-seven.

==== Homecourt advantage ====
During the first two rounds of the playoffs, two games from within the same division are played in the same gameday at the same venue. Because of this, a different system is used to determine homecourt advantage for those two rounds, shown in the table below. Both the division finals and national finals use a traditional 2–2–1 format, where the higher-seeded team hosts games 1, 2, and 5.

Seed		Court		
DQF	DSF	Game 1	Game 2	Game 3
1st	Highest	Home	Neutral	Home
2nd	Highest	Home	Neutral	Home or Neutral
3rd	Second-highest	Neutral	Home	Home or Neutral
4th	Second-highest	Neutral	Home	Home or Neutral
5th	Second-lowest	Neutral	Away	Away or neutral
6th	Second-lowest	Neutral	Away	Away or neutral
7th	Lowest	Away	Neutral	Away or neutral
8th	Lowest	Away	Neutral	Away

=== Awards ===
A majority of the league's awards are given out during the national finals, such as the Most Valuable Player and Defensive Player of the Year awards. Two awards, the Finals MVP and Coach of the Year, are given out after the finals.

=== Roster regulations ===
There is no draft held during the off-season, instead teams acquire their players through the signing of contracts. Teams must have a minimum of 15 players in their roster, with the maximum being 22. In each game, however, teams can only field a 15-man roster into the court. All local players are eligible, although teams can also sign up to two Filipino-foreigners. The league currently doesn't allow imports, but if a team is competing at an international competition, such as the East Asia Super League, that team will be able to sign imports as reinforcements for the competition.

Being based in the grassroots level, each team is required to have at least three homegrown players who come from the team's home locality. Since 2022, with the transition to professional status, the league has also allowed collegiate players to join as long as the player is granted a Special Guest License from the Games and Amusement Board. Since June 1, 2024, the NCAA no longer allows SGLs to play professionally. The league also had an ex-professional player limit, where teams were allowed to sign limited number of players with prior professional experience. This was replaced with an ex-PBA player limit in 2022, and in 2024 the limit was scrapped in its entirety. The league schedules a window during the middle of the season where teams can propose trades, all to be approved by the commissioner's office.

== Championships ==
As of 2025, six teams have won the championship, with the Pampanga Giant Lanterns being the only team to win two titles. Four teams have made two appearances in the national finals thus far.

†	Team has since departed the league

Team	Win	Loss	Total	Year(s) won	Year(s) lost
Pampanga Giant Lanterns†	2	0	2	2023, 2024	—
San Juan Knights	1	1	2	2019	2021
Davao Occidental Tigers†	1	1	2	2021	2019
Batangas City Athletics	1	0	1	2018	—
Nueva Ecija Rice Vanguards†	1	0	1	2022	—
Abra Weavers	1	0	1	2025	—
Quezon Huskers	0	2	2	—	2024, 2025
Muntinlupa Cagers†	0	1	1	—	2018
Zamboanga Sikat	0	1	1	—	2022
Bacoor City Strikers†	0	1	1	—	2023

=== Junior MPBL ===
Year	Season	Age group	Champion	Runner-up
2023	Season 1	U-14	Cavite City Aces Solar	Mindoro Junior Disiplinados
2023	Season 1	U-16	Davao Red Cubs	Quezon City 828 Junior Giants
2023	Season 1	U-18	Mandaluyong Junior Microsmith	Davao Red Cubs
2024	Season 2	U-14	Biñan Tatak Gel	Rizal Switch Fiber
2024	Season 2	U-16	San Pedro Spartans	Makabagong San Juan Mighty Warriors
2024	Season 2	U-18	Palawan Yurich Builders	Rizal Switch Fiber
2024	Season 2	D-League (U-21)	Pasig Servants	Caloocan JY Batang Kankaloo

== Impact ==
=== Player development and movement ===
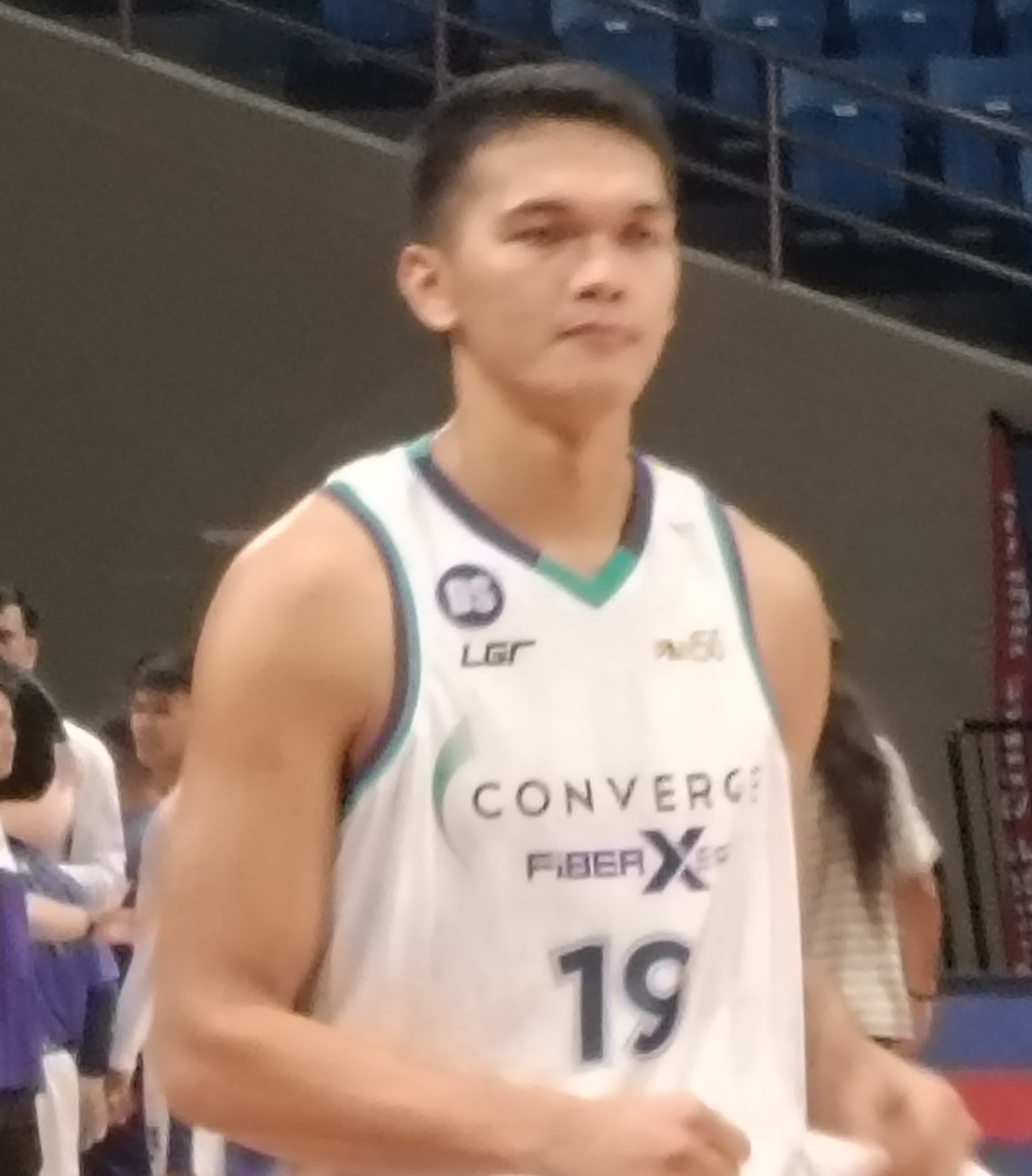
Justine Baltazar (pictured with the Converge FiberXers) led the Pampanga Giant Lanterns to back-to-back titles in 2023 and 2024 before joining the PBA.

Over time, the MPBL has grown to become a hub for collegiate players or prospects to play competitive basketball before joining top-flight leagues such as the Philippine Basketball Association. Its earliest prospects include former NBA D-League player Bobby Ray Parks Jr. and future two-time PBA Finals MVP Mikey Williams, both of whom went on to be drafted highly in the PBA. The PBA drafts in both season 49 (2024) and season 50 (2025) saw Justine Baltazar and Geo Chiu, respectively, selected with the first overall pick. Both players had stints in the MPBL prior to selection. Among other notable prospects include Aris Dionisio, Kemark Cariño, CJ Cansino, Jason Brickman, and Mike Phillips.

In recent years, the league has also positioned itself as an alternative to the PBA, with players such as Encho Serrano and Dave Ildefonso choosing to compete in the regional league instead of the top-flight. Some were reported to be earning salaries equivalent to or larger than the ₱420,000 maximum salary offered by the PBA. However, players are subject to bans from the PBA due to playing should it be considered ligang labas, including Kyt Jimenez and Larry Muyang.

The growth of the league also led to the PBA creating new regulations which aimed to further minimize player movement between the two leagues. In August 2025, the league began banning players under expiring contracts who decide move to other leagues, domestic or international. In January 2026, players must not have existing contractual obligations with other teams before the draft proper. At the time, the PBA draft is held around the same time as the MPBL reaches the back end of the regular season and into the postseason.

=== Spin-off leagues ===
Following the success of the MPBL, Pacquiao has made further developments in grassroots-based sports. On June 15, 2023, the Junior MPBL was unveiled in a press conference. The youth-oriented league's inaugural season began on July 9, 2023, with teams competing in 14-under, 16-under, and 18-under divisions. The junior league features a 21-under division, billed as the "Junior MPBL D-League". In the same press conference, Pacquiao also shared intent to create a volleyball counterpart similar to the MPBL that will cater to female players. That league would be known as the Maharlika Pilipinas Volleyball Association (MPVA) and began on October 22, 2023, with eight teams. On October 27, 2024, it was reported that a direct women's counterpart, the Women's Maharlika Pilipinas Basketball League is in development. UST Growling Tigers coach Haydee Ong was set to be the first commissioner of the women's league.

== Media coverage ==
Since 2025, Solar Entertainment Corporation has held the television broadcast rights to the league via Solar Sports. The current agreement, which took into effect in 2026, allows the network to air up to twelve games per week, in addition to all playoff games. The league has also streamed all games through its social media platforms and other online services.

In the past, the MPBL has also partnered with ABS-CBN Sports from 2018 to 2022, Fox Sports from 2018 to 2019, IBC and TAP DMV in 2021, and Cignal TV from 2022 to 2024.

== Leadership ==
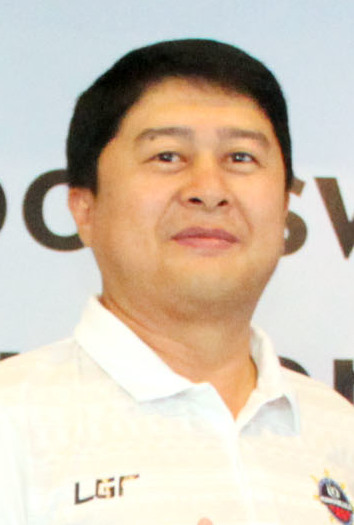
Kenneth Duremdes, incumbent MPBL president since 2026 and commissioner from 2017 to 2026.

The two highest executive roles in the league are the president and the commissioner. The commissioner of the MPBL was established from the start with Snow Badua appointed as the inaugural commissioner in 2017. but was succeeded by Kenneth Duremdes later in the year. In 2026, Duremdes was promoted to president of the MPBL after eight years as commissioner. Former head of operations Emmerson Oreta took over as the league's third commissioner.

=== Presidents ===
President	Tenure	
President	From	To
Kenneth Duremdes	January 17, 2026	Incumbent

=== Commissioners ===
Commissioner	Tenure	
Commissioner	From	To
Snow Badua	August 29, 2017	November 22, 2017
Kenneth Duremdes	November 22, 2017	January 17, 2026
Emmerson Oreta	January 17, 2026	Incumbent

== See also ==
- Maharlika Pilipinas Volleyball Association
- Women's Maharlika Pilipinas Basketball League
- List of MPBL champions
- List of MPBL records
- List of MPBL awards
- List of MPBL seasons
- List of MPBL rivalries
