= Akari Lighting & Technology =

Philippine lighting company

- Industry: Lighting
- Founded: 2002
- Headquarters: Quezon City, Philippines
- Key people: Chris Tiu (CEO)
- Products: Lamps, switch panels, lighting fixtures, automated light systems
- Owner: Carlson Group of Companies
- Website: akari.com.ph

Akari Lighting & Technology Corporation (stylized as AKARI) is a major Philippine manufacturing and distribution company specializing in energy-efficient consumer lighting, commercial LED systems, and electrical solutions. Headquartered in Quezon City, the company is a subsidiary of the Carlson Group of Companies and operates as one of the largest suppliers of residential and industrial lighting products in the Philippines.

== History ==
Akari is a lighting brand under the Carlson Group of Companies of the Tiu family. Tiu patriarch Carlos started the family business in the 1970s becoming a distributor of Japanese light bulbs and fixtures. The family became the exclusive distributor of Toshiba lighting and wiring products in the Philippines. Carlson Group manufactured Toshiba lamps at its factory in Cavite until the plant's closure in 2006 due to economic reasons.

Japanese products are reputed for its quality but the Tius accessed that it may be too expensive for a lower-income demographic. Christopher Tiu secured supply of Chinese manufactured light bulbs and equipment for less cost which became the basis of the Akari brand, which came from the Japanese word for light (明かり). Akari was introduced in 2002 and was promoted as an energy saving lamp (ESL) brand.

Akari Lighting & Technology Corp. was established in 2002 to address the growing domestic demand for energy-efficient consumer lighting and electrical products in the Philippines. The brand initially focused on distributing compact fluorescent lamps (CFLs) and standard electrical accessories before pivoting its core product catalog toward light-emitting diode (LED) technology and eco-friendly solar lighting systems.

Throughout the 2010s, the company transitioned from a localized supplier into a major national distributor by securing placement across the country's primary modern trade and DIY retail networks. By integrating its logistics with major hardware conglomerates, the company scaled its operations to encompass a catalog of over 1,000 distinct stock keeping units (SKUs) distributed across more than 1,000 retail storefronts nationwide.

To capture the emerging smart home and renewable sectors, the company expanded its portfolio to include rechargeable domestic appliances, emergency power devices, and residential solar arrays manufactured under international safety standards.

== Brands and product portfolio ==
The company categorizes its inventory across several specialized consumer and industrial segments:

- Akari Lighting: The core brand encompassing residential LED bulbs, compact fluorescent lamps (CFLs), downlights, and decorative lighting fixtures.
- NXLED: Launched in 2012 as the company's next-generation premium line, focusing on smart lighting systems, architectural lighting, and integrated home automation devices.
- Power and Electrical: A division manufacturing domestic electrical wiring devices, extension cords, surge protectors, and voltage regulators.
- Renewable Energy and Emergency Systems: Focuses on residential solar arrays, solar-powered floodlights, rechargeable emergency lanterns, and portable cooling fans.

== Products and brands ==
Akari operates as a primary market leader and high-volume distributor of consumer lighting and small domestic appliances in the Philippines, maintaining a portfolio of over 1,000 distinct stock keeping units (SKUs) nationwide. The company functions as the leading brand by retail presence and sales volume within major national hardware store chains, modern trade DIY centers, and independent electrical wholesale networks across the country. The company integrates global design aesthetics with local engineering, collaborating with Italian lighting designers to develop contemporary residential fixtures and architectural lighting solutions that cater to modern Filipino interior design trends.

The company's expanded product segments include:

- Consumer and Architectural Lighting: Comprises residential LED bulbs, downlights, panel lights, track lights, crystal chandeliers, pendant lamps, and decorative wall fixtures.
- NXLED: Launched in 2012, NXLED operates as the company's next-generation premium brand, focusing on high-end architectural lighting, smart lighting systems, dimmable smart bulbs, and integrated home automation devices.
- Power, Wiring, and Hardware Instruments: Includes domestic flush-type wall switches and outlets, heavy-duty extension cords, surge protectors, international travel adapters, step-down transformers, automatic voltage regulators (AVR), and digital circuit breakers.
- Energy, Solar, and Emergency Systems: Focuses on heavy-duty rechargeable emergency lights, automated exit signs, solar-powered floodlights, solar street lights, portable cooling equipment (such as misting fans and rechargeable desk fans), and residential solar panels.
- Domestic Utility and Pest Control: Features specialized electronic pest control devices, including high-voltage mosquito swatters and ultraviolet insect killers.

=== Market Position and Endorsements ===
As of its early expansion, the company established a top-three market share position for domestic lighting systems in the Philippines. To support its nationwide consumer hardware footprint, Akari utilizes high-profile brand ambassadors. In March 2025, the company signed an exclusive partnership with the Filipino pop group BINI to serve as the official endorsers for its portable and rechargeable fan lineup, targeting the youth and lifestyle market demographics. All distributed products carry official Philippine Standard (PS) and Import Commodity Clearance (ICC) quality seals.

== Distribution and market presence ==
Akari Lighting & Technology Corp. operates a nationwide distribution network within the Philippines, supplying over 1,000 lighting, electrical, and energy-saving products. The company's product line includes LED bulbs, emergency lights, solar floodlights, and domestic electrical wiring devices.

The brand's retail footprint spans more than 1,000 traditional and modern DIY hardware stores across the country, including major national home improvement chains such as ACE Hardware, Wilcon Depot, Citi Hardware, Handyman, and Robinsons Builders. To meet local regulatory and safety benchmarks, the company's distributed products carry Philippine Standard (PS) and Import Commodity Clearance (ICC) certifications, manufactured in compliance with International Electrotechnical Commission (IEC) standards.

== Involvement in sports ==
Akari is a prominent corporate sponsor and stakeholder in Philippine sports, particularly in volleyball and basketball, managed through its Akari Sports division. Akari has two women's volleyball teams in the Premier Volleyball League of the Philippines; the Akari Chargers which joined in 2022 and the Nxled Chameleons which followed suit in the following year. It is also funding the construction of the Home of the UAAP, a dedicated indoor arena for the collegiate University Athletic Association of the Philippines (UAAP).

=== Professional Volleyball ===
The company owns and operates two professional women's volleyball franchises competing in the Premier Volleyball League (PVL):

- Akari Chargers: Established and joined the PVL in 2022 as an expansion team.
- Nxled Chameleons: Launched in 2023 under Akari's next-generation LED brand portfolio to serve as the company's second professional franchise in the league.

=== Collegiate and National Basketball ===
In collegiate sports, Akari is the primary corporate benefactor funding the construction of the "Home of the UAAP," a dedicated, state-of-the-art indoor arena designed for the University Athletic Association of the Philippines (UAAP).

The company also extends corporate sponsorship to grassroots and international youth basketball, serving as a key partner for the Samahang Basketbol ng Pilipinas (SBP) and the Gilas Pilipinas Youth women's national program during major regional tournaments like the FIBA U18 Women's Asia Cup SEABA Qualifiers. Additionally, the brand partners with non-profit affiliates such as BPW Junior Philippines to organize youth developmental tournaments and community sports programs, including the annual Akari Cup and Type 1 Diabetes youth sports camps.
