= Aquilino Q. Pimentel International Convention Center =

Convention venue in Cagayan de Oro, Philippines

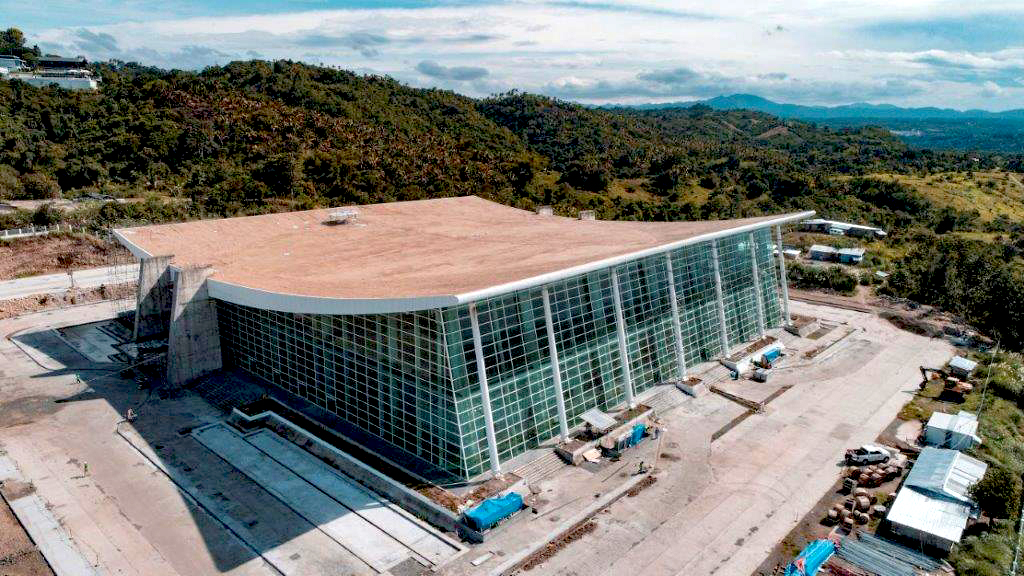
- Interactive map of Aquilino Q. Pimentel International Convention Center
- Former names: Cagayan de Oro Convention Center
- Location: Cagayan de Oro, Philippines
- Coordinates: 8°25′11″N 124°38′35″E

Construction
- Built: 2001–2021
- Cost: ₱1.335 billion

Tenant
- Philippine Basketball Association (out-of-town games)

The Aquilino Q. Pimentel Jr. International Convention Center (APICC) is a convention and exhibition venue complex and indoor arena in Cagayan de Oro, Philippines. Originally known as Cagayan de Oro Convention Center, the venue began construction in 2001, and for the next twenty years experienced a series of setbacks and disputes before its eventual completion in 2021.

Aquilino Pimentel Jr., a Misamis Oriental native and former CDO mayor, first created the project during his time in the Senate. In 2022, the facility was renamed after Pimentel under Republic Act No. 11485.

== Construction ==
The convention center project was conceptualized by then-Senator Aquilino Pimentel Jr., who hailed from Cagayan de Oro, at the start of his term in 1998. Construction of the facility began on June 30, 2001 and was projected to be complete in August 2003.

However the construction of the convention center was stalled in multiple occasions. During the administration of President Gloria Macapagal Arroyo, there was difficulty in securing funds for the project. Pimentel alleged that Arroyo was blocking the release of funds for projects initiated by legislators belonging to the opposition including the convention center project. The former senator had suggested naming the facility after Arroyo's father Diosdado Macapagal, due to her parent also being a former president, in a bid to secure her support for the project. By November 2009, only 45 percent of the project was completed.

Another setback was experienced in 2012 due to an ownership dispute over the site of the facility which was only resolved in late 2016. Construction work on the main building started in February 2018.

By July 2019, the convention center is already 56 percent complete; with the main building 88 percent finished.

The Department of Public Works and Highways announced the completion of the convention center's main building on September 8, 2021.

Pimentel has proposed the site to be named after Pablo P. Magtajas who was mayor of Cagayan de Oro from 1984 to 1998.

House Bill No. (HBN) 8842 renaming Cagayan de Oro (CDO) International Convention Center as Aquilino Q. Pimentel, Jr., was approved by the House of Representatives on the third and final reading on March 22, 2021, while the Senate passed it on January 31, 2022. This lapsed into law on June 18, 2022, without the signature of President Rodrigo Duterte in accordance with Article VI Section 27 (1) of the 1987 Constitution.

== Facilities ==
The CDO Convention Center's main building covers an area of 10,500 square meters (113,000 sq ft) and has a spectator capacity of 7,700 while it could host additional 700 people through its function rooms. The building complex will also host a dedicated building that will house offices of the Tourism Infrastructure and Enterprise Zone Authority (TIEZA), a multistory car park building, a viewing deck, a helipad, a pavilion, and an administrative building among other facilities.

== Events ==
=== PBA out-of-town games ===
Date	Winning team	Result	Losing team	Ref.
December 16, 2023	Rain or Shine Elasto Painters	113–110	Magnolia Chicken Timplados Hotshots	
April 27, 2024	Barangay Ginebra San Miguel	105–93	Converge FiberXers	
August 31, 2024	NLEX Road Warriors	112–108 (OT)	San Miguel Beermen	
June 7, 2025	San Miguel Beermen	120–111	Rain or Shine Elasto Painters	
November 15, 2025	Rain or Shine Elasto Painters	91–89	TNT Tropang 5G	
