= Victorias City Coliseum =

Arena in Negros Occidental, Philippines

- Inside the coliseum
- Interactive map of Victorias City Coliseum
- Full name: Victorias Sports and Amusement Center
- Location: Victorias, Negros Occidental, Philippines
- Coordinates: 10°53′35.3″N 123°02′50.8″E
- Capacity: 8,000

Tenant
- Philippine Basketball Association (out-of-town games)

The Victorias Sports and Amusement Center, commonly known as the Victorias City Coliseum, is an indoor arena in Victorias, Negros Occidental, Philippines.

== Background ==
The Victorias City Coliseum is an indoor arena in Victorias, a city in the province of Negros Occidental. It has a capacity of 8,000 seats.

The venue has been used for matches of the Philippine Basketball Association. It will also be one of the venues of the 2025 FIFA Futsal Women's World Cup. It is also used for events by the local government and political functions such as rallies.
