= Chavit Coliseum =

Indoor arena in Vigan, Ilocos Sur, Philippines

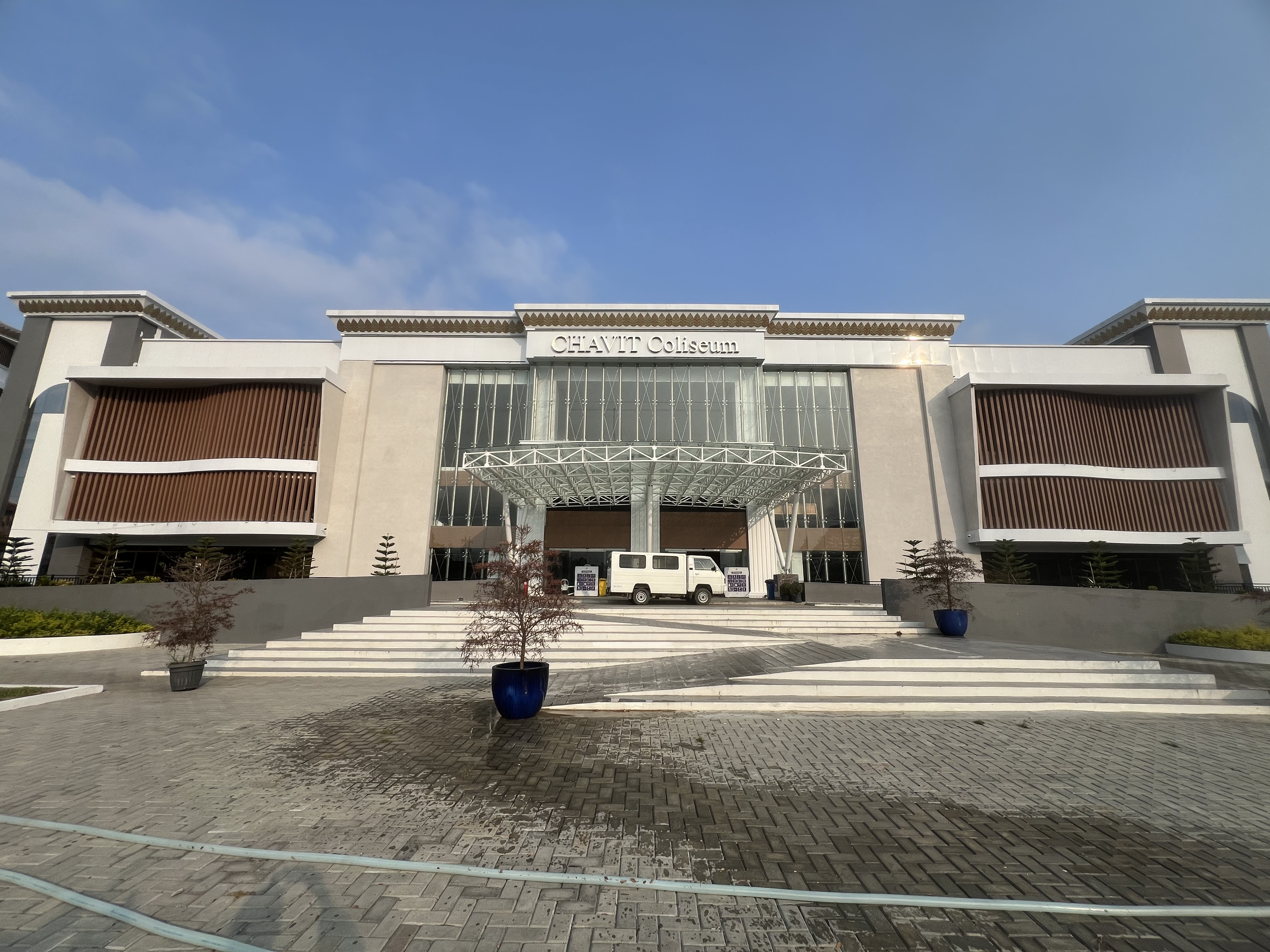
- Interactive map of Chavit Coliseum
- Full name: Center for Harvest Activities, Value Chain Development, Innovation, and Training Coliseum
- Location: Vigan, Ilocos Sur, Philippines
- Coordinates: 17°33′43″N 120°23′08″E
- Capacity: 9,000–10,000

Construction
- Opened: June 21, 2025

Tenants
- Premier Volleyball League (Tour games); Philippine Basketball Association (out-of-town games)

Center for Harvest Activities, Value Chain Development, Innovation, and Training Coliseum, commonly known as the Chavit Coliseum (stylized as CHAVIT) is an indoor arena located in Vigan, Ilocos Sur, Philippines. The arena opened on June 21, 2025 and has a capacity of 9,000. It is named after businessman and former Ilocos Sur governor Chavit Singson.

== History ==
Chavit Coliseum opened on June 21, 2025. The first event held at the arena was a launch event for Chavit: The Legend of the Philippines, a book written by Maciej Mikurda. Chavit Singson, the arena's namesake, was present at the arena alongside incumbent governor Jerry Singson.

During the two days following the arena's opening, on June 22 and 23, it hosted the first set of matches of the 2025 Premier Volleyball League on Tour.

== Events ==
=== PBA out-of-town games ===
Date	Winning team	Result	Losing team	Ref.
October 18, 2025	TNT Tropang 5G	110–103	Converge FiberXers	

== Facilities ==
The Chavit Coliseum is an indoor arena meant to host concerts, sporting events and other gatherings. It has a seating capacity of 9,000 to 10,000.
