= Capital Arena =

Largest indoor arena in Cagayan Valley, Philippines

The Capital Arena
- The Premier Event Destination in Ilagan
- The Capital Arena in 2024
- Interactive map of The Capital Arena
- Location: Civic Center, Alibagu, Ilagan, Isabela, Philippines
- Coordinates: 17°05′58″N 121°51′18″E
- Owner: City Government of Ilagan
- Operator: Local Economic Development and Investment Promotions Office
- Capacity: 10,000

Construction
- Opened: November 24, 2024; 21 months ago
- Cost: PH₱750 million

Tenants
- Premier Volleyball League (on Tour games); Ilagan Isabela Cowboys (MPBL) (2025–present); The Asian Tournament

Website
- cityofilagan.com/capitalarena/

The Capital Arena is an indoor arena located in Ilagan, Isabela, Philippines. The arena officially opened on November 24, 2024 and has a seating capacity of 10,000. It is the largest indoor arena in Cagayan Valley region, and serves as the home venue of the Ilagan Isabela Cowboys of the Maharlika Pilipinas Basketball League (MPBL). It has also hosted games of the Premier Volleyball League, East Asia Super League, and The Asian Tournament.

== History ==
The Capital Arena was inaugurated on November 24, 2024. It was built at the cost of ₱750 million.

== Tenants ==
The arena's primary tenant is the Ilagan Isabela Cowboys of the Maharlika Pilipinas Basketball League, who joined the league in 2025. The Meralco Bolts of the Philippine Basketball Association (PBA) will also play two of their 2025–26 East Asia Super League home games at the venue.

The venue has also hosted select games of the 2025 PVL on Tour of the Premier Volleyball League, as well as games of The Asian Tournament.

Preceded by first venue	Home of the Ilagan Isabela Cowboys; 2025–present	Succeeded by current
