= 2025 MPBL finals =

Championship series of the Maharlika Pilipinas Basketball League's 2025 season

Team	Coach	Wins
Abra Solid North Weavers	Yong Garcia	3
Quezon Huskers	Eric Gonzales	0
- Dates: December 11–16, 2025
- MVP: Jason Brickman
- Northern finals: Abra def. Pangasinan, 3–0
- Southern finals: Quezon def. Biñan, 3–2

The 2025 MPBL finals was the championship series of the Maharlika Pilipinas Basketball League's (MPBL) 2025 season and the conclusion of the season's playoffs. The best-of-five series concluded with the North Division champion Abra Solid North Weavers defeating the South Division champion Quezon Huskers. The series began on December 11, and ended on December 16. The North Weavers' Jason Brickman was named as the MPBL Finals MVP.

This is the third consecutive finals series that a sweep was completed after Pampanga went on to win back-to-back championships in 2023 and 2024. Abra held homecourt advantage, as they hold sole possession of the best regular season record in 2025.

This was the first finals in league history to feature a team from Northern Luzon, as the Weavers originate from Cordillera, and the first since 2021 to not feature a team from Central Luzon. For the third straight season, a team from Calabarzon was represented.

== Background ==
=== Abra Solid North Weavers ===
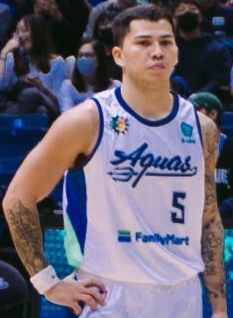
Jason Brickman was among the players signed by Abra during the off-season, becoming a key player during the playoffs. He will join the PBA after this series.

After losing to the eventual champion Pampanga Giant Lanterns in the North Division quarterfinals in their inaugural season, the team made numerous acquisitions leaning towards younger talent. The team signed Dave Ildefonso, Geo Chiu, Jason Brickman, and Encho Serrano among others.

Abra's rebuild towards youth ended up paying off big time as the Weavers dominated the regular season, going 28–1. The team put together a 26-game winning streak, surpassing Nueva Ecija Rice Vanguards' mark of 25 from 2022, and breaking a tie for most regular season wins in a season, which was shared by five different teams.

Their dominant form continued in the playoffs. They first swept expansion team Ilagan Isabela Cowboys in the division quarterfinals, and then eliminated the Caloocan Batang Kankaloo in the division semifinals with another two-game sweep. They then met an unlikely opponent in the North Division finals, as they faced the seventh-seeded Pangasinan Heatwaves, who joined the league alongside Abra in 2024. In the best-of-five Northern Luzon showdown, Abra beat Pangasinan in three games to reach their first MPBL finals after just two seasons.

After this series, multiple players, including Chiu and Brickman, will move up to the Philippine Basketball Association following their selections in the PBA season 50 draft.

== Road to the finals ==
Abra Solid North Weavers (North Division champion)		Quezon Huskers (South Division champion)
Pos / Team / Pld / W / L / GB; 1 / z – Abra Solid North Weavers / 29 / 28 / 1 / —; 2 / x – Nueva Ecija Rice Vanguards / 29 / 27 / 2 / 1; 3 / x – San Juan Knights / 29 / 26 / 3 / 2; 4 / x – Caloocan Batang Kankaloo / 29 / 21 (Note: Caloocan (1.133) wins tiebreaker over Pampanga (1.029), and Pasay (0.886) based on head-to-head point quotient.) / 8 / 7; 5 / x – Pampanga Giant Lanterns / 29 / 21 / 8 / 7; 6 / x – Pasay Voyagers / 29 / 21 / 8 / 7; 7 / x – Pangasinan Heatwaves / 29 / 20 / 9 / 8; 8 / x – Ilagan Isabela Cowboys / 29 / 15 / 14 / 13; 9 / p – Bataan Risers / 29 / 13 / 16 / 15; 10 / p – Pasig City / 29 / 12 / 17 / 16; 11 / Val City Magic / 29 / 7 (Note: Valenzuela wins tiebreaker over Quezon City based on head-to-head match-up.) / 22 / 21; 12 / Quezon City Galeries Taipan / 29 / 7 / 22 / 21; 13 / Manila Batang Quiapo / 29 / 4 (Note: Manila wins tiebreaker over Marikina based on head-to-head match-up.) / 25 / 24; 14 / Marikina Shoemasters / 29 / 4 / 25 / 24; 15 / Bulacan Kuyas / 29 / 3 / 26 / 25; Source: Standings p – Clinched play-in berth, but failed to reach playoffs; x – Clinched playoff berth; z – Clinched best record in league Notes:	Regular season	Pos / Team / Pld / W / L / GB; 1 / y – Quezon Huskers / 29 / 25 / 4 / —; 2 / x – Batangas City Tanduay Rum Masters / 29 / 20 / 9 / 5; 3 / x – Rizal Golden Coolers / 29 / 19 / 10 / 6; 4 / x – Basilan Starhorse / 29 / 18 (Note: Basilan wins tiebreaker over General Santos based on head-to-head match-up.) / 11 / 7; 5 / x – GenSan Warriors / 29 / 18 / 11 / 7; 6 / x – Biñan Tatak Gel / 29 / 17 (Note: Biñan wins tiebreaker over Zamboanga based on head-to-head match-up.) / 12 / 8; 7 / x – Zamboanga Sikat / 29 / 17 / 12 / 8; 8 / x – Mindoro Tamaraws / 29 / 15 / 14 / 10; 9 / p – Davao Occidental Tigers / 29 / 12 / 17 / 13; 10 / p – Cebu Greats / 29 / 11 / 18 / 14; 11 / Sarangani Gripper Motorcycle Tire / 29 / 10 (Note: Sarangani wins tiebreaker over Muntinlupa based on head-to-head match-up.) / 19 / 15; 12 / Muntinlupa Cagers / 29 / 10 / 19 / 15; 13 / Imus Braderhood / 29 / 9 / 20 / 16; 14 / Bacolod Tubo Slashers / 29 / 4 / 25 / 21; 15 / Parañaque Patriots / 29 / 1 / 28 / 24; Source: Standings p – Clinched play-in berth, but failed to reach playoffs; x – Clinched playoff berth; y – Clinched best record in division Notes:
Defeated 8th-seeded Ilagan Isabela Cowboys, 2–0	Division quarterfinals	Defeated 8th-seeded Mindoro Tamaraws, 2–0
Defeated 4th-seeded Caloocan Batang Kankaloo, 2–0	Division semifinals	Defeated 5th-seeded GenSan Warriors, 2–0
Defeated 7th-seeded Pangasinan Heatwaves, 3–0	Division finals	Defeated 6th-seeded Biñan Tatak Gel, 3–2

=== Head-to-head matchup ===
Solar Sports

May 31
08:00 pm

Boxscore

Abra Weavers	63–53	Quezon Huskers
Scoring by quarter: 11–11, 23–19, 17–10, 12–13
Pts: Dave Ildefonso 25; Rebs: Encho Serrano 11; Asts: Encho Serrano 4		Pts: Judel Fuentes 15; Rebs: Joseph Gabayni 9 Asts: LJay Gonzales, Diego Dario 3

University of Bangued Gymnasium, Bangued, Abra

== Series summary ==
For this year's national finals, the Abra Weavers will hold homecourt advantage for the series, as they hold a better regular season record compared to the Quezon Huskers (28–1 vs. 25–4).

Game	Date	Winning team	Result (Series)	Losing team	Venue
1	December 11	Abra Weavers	81–80 (OT) (1–0)	Quezon Huskers	Gov. Andres Bernos Memorial Gym
2	December 13	Abra Weavers	62–58 (2–0)	Quezon Huskers	Gov. Andres Bernos Memorial Gym
3	December 16	Abra Weavers	94–85 (OT) (3–0)	Quezon Huskers	Quezon Convention Center

== Game summaries ==
NOTE: All times are Philippine Standard Time (UTC+8:00).

=== Game 1 ===
Solar Sports

December 11
7:00 p.m.

Boxscore

Abra Weavers	81–80 (OT)	Quezon Huskers
Scoring by quarter: 19–22, 12–11, 23–20, 18–19, Overtime: 9–8
Pts: Jason Brickman 15; Rebs: John Uduba 8 Asts: Jason Brickman 6		Pts: Christian Pagaran 20; Rebs: Joseph Gabayni 10; Asts: LJay Gonzales 4
Abra leads series, 1–0

University of Bangued Gymnasium, Bangued, Abra

=== Game 2 ===
Solar Sports

December 13
7:00 p.m.

Boxscore

Quezon Huskers	58–62	Abra Weavers
Scoring by quarter: 14–14, 14–14, 15–20, 15–14
Pts: LJay Gonzales 15; Rebs: Vince Magbuhos 10; Asts: Gab Banal 4		Pts: Dave Ildefonso, Jason Brickman 14; Rebs: Dave Ildefonso 13; Asts: Encho Serrano 4
Abra leads series, 2–0

University of Bangued Gymnasium, Bangued, Abra

=== Game 3 ===
Solar Sports

December 16
7:00 p.m.

Boxscore

Quezon Huskers	85–94 (OT)	Abra Weavers
Scoring by quarter: 16–17, 19–21, 20–18, 20–19, Overtime: 10–19
Pts: Judel Fuentes 15; Rebs: Ximone Sandagon 9 Asts: LJay Gonzales 11		Pts: Dave Ildefonso 23; Rebs: Dave Ildefonso, John Uduba 10; Asts: Jason Brickman 5
Abra wins series, 3–0

Quezon Convention Center, Lucena

== Rosters ==
2025 Abra Solid North Weavers roster
Players

Pos.	No.	Name	Height	Weight	DOB	From
F	1	Dave Ildefonso	6 ft 2 in (1.88 m)	190 lb (86 kg)	2000–04–14	Ateneo
G	2	Encho Serrano	6 ft 0 in (1.83 m)	176 lb (80 kg)	1999–09–18	De La Salle
F	3	Harley Baldo
G	4	Marwin Taywan	5 ft 9 in (1.75 m)		1988–07–08	Emilio Aguinaldo
G	5	Joshua David				De La Salle
F	6	Jayson Apolonio	6 ft 3 in (1.91 m)			DMMMSU
F/C	9	Raven Gonzales	6 ft 7 in (2.01 m)			De La Salle
F	11	Enrico Joaquin Garcia
G/F	12	Will Keane Lee (HG)	6 ft 0 in (1.83 m)
F	13	Georell Gonzales (HG)	6 ft 1 in (1.85 m)
F	14	Leo Najorda	6 ft 3 in (1.91 m)	190 lb (86 kg)	1982–02–16	Ateneo
F	16	CJ Austria	6 ft 3 in (1.91 m)			De La Salle
F	23	Redel Fabro (HG)	6 ft 1 in (1.85 m)			Olivarez
F	24	John Uduba	6 ft 4 in (1.93 m)			Olivarez
F	83	Mark Yee	6 ft 3 in (1.91 m)	170 lb (77 kg)	1982–01–04	San Sebastian (Cavite)
C	92	Geo Chiu	6 ft 10 in (2.08 m)	249 lb (113 kg)	2001–05–18	Ateneo
G	95	Jason Brickman (FF)	6 ft 0 in (1.83 m)	165 lb (75 kg)	1991–11–19	LIU Brooklyn

Coaches

Head coach

- Yong Garcia

Assistant coach(es)

- Jerry Andaleon
- Denok Miranda
- Don Urro
- Edsel Vallena

Legend

- (HG) Homegrown
- (FF) Filipino-foreigner
- (SGL) Special Guest Licensee
- (RS) Reserve player
- Injured

- Roster – via Genius Sports
Updated as of: March 8, 2025

2025 Quezon Huskers roster
Players

Pos.	No.	Name	Height	Weight	DOB	From
G/F	1	Robin Roño				National-U
G/F	2	Judel Ric Fuentes	5 ft 10 in (1.78 m)			Centro Escolar
F	4	Rafael Salonga (HG)
F/C	5	Ximone Sandagon (HG)				Far Eastern
F	6	Bryant Placino (HG)
G/F	7	Domark Matillano
G/F	10	Mark Alcala (HG)				De La Salle
F	12	Rodel Gravera (HG)				Far Eastern
G	13	Ljay Gonzales	5 ft 11 in (1.80 m)			Far Eastern
G/F	14	Xyrus Torres	6 ft 0 in (1.83 m)		2000-09-23	Far Eastern
F/C	15	Will Gozum (injured)	6 ft 6 in (1.98 m)	205 lb (93 kg)	1999–04–08	St. Benilde
F	17	Jason Opiso				Centro Escolar
G	18	Thomas Torres	5 ft 9 in (1.75 m)		1994–10–27	De La Salle
G	20	Christopher Lagrama (HG)
F	24	RJ Minerva				National-U
G/F	25	Al Francis Tamsi	6 ft 1 in (1.85 m)	158 lb (72 kg)	1992–03–25	Far Eastern
G	29	Alvin Abundo	5 ft 8 in (1.73 m)	150 lb (68 kg)	1992–10–29	Centro Escolar
F/C	34	Lander Canon
F/C	41	Jessie Saitanan	6 ft 5 in (1.96 m)	200 lb (91 kg)	1992–10–07	Mapúa
F/C	55	Christian Buñag
F	77	Gab Banal	6 ft 3 in (1.91 m)	200 lb (91 kg)	1990–09–09	Mapúa
G/F	99	Niño Ibañez
G	—	Diego Dario	5 ft 8 in (1.73 m)	145 lb (66 kg)	1997–01–06	Philippines
C	—	Joseph Gabayni	6 ft 5 in (1.96 m)		1994–09–28	Lyceum
F/C	—	Vince Magbuhos	6 ft 5 in (1.96 m)		1999–10–07	Adamson
G/F	—	Christian Pagaran	6 ft 2 in (1.88 m)			UPHSD
F	—	JP Sarao	6 ft 3 in (1.91 m)	220 lb (100 kg)	1995–02–23	Saint Francis of Assisi
G	—	Emman Tagle (HG)	5 ft 10 in (1.78 m)			San Beda
G/F	—	Joshua Yerro	6 ft 1 in (1.85 m)	185 lb (84 kg)	2000–05–24	Adamson

Coaches

Head coach

- Eric Gonzales

Assistant coach(es)

- Nash Racela
- Richie Ticzon
- Ed Dela Torre
- Luis Nolasco
- Jonathan de Guzman
- Bernard de Guia

Legend

- (HG) Homegrown
- (FF) Filipino-foreigner
- (SGL) Special Guest Licensee
- (RS) Reserve player
- Injured

- Roster – via Genius Sports
Updated as of: February 26, 2025

== Broadcasting ==
This was the first MPBL finals under the league's partnership with Solar Entertainment Corporation, with games airing live on Solar Sports. Additionally, the league's YouTube channel and PusoP was also streamed the games.
