= 2025 MPBL playoffs =

Playoffs for the Maharlika Pilipinas Basketball League's 2025 season

2025 747 Live MPBL Playoffs presented by Xtreme

Tournament details
- Country: Philippines
- Dates: October 2 – December 16, 2025
- Teams: 20
- Defending champions: Pampanga Giant Lanterns

Final positions
- Champions: Abra Solid North Weavers
- Runners-up: Quezon Huskers
- Semifinalists: Pangasinan Heatwaves; Biñan Tatak Gel

Tournament statistics
- Matches played: 40

The 2025 MPBL playoffs is the postseason tournament of the Maharlika Pilipinas Basketball League's 2025 season, the league's seventh overall, and first under play-in tournament format. The postseason tournament began in October, after the conclusion of the regular season.

== Overview ==
=== Updates to playoff appearances ===
- The Abra Weavers entered the playoffs for the second consecutive season and also clinch the best record in the league for the first time in franchise history.
- The Quezon Huskers entered the playoffs for the third consecutive season and also clinch the best record in the South Division for the second consecutive season.
- The San Juan Knights and Zamboanga Sikat entered the playoffs for the sixth consecutive season.
- The Batangas City Tanduay Rum Masters entered the playoffs for the seventh consecutive season, currently the longest playoff streak in the MPBL.
- The GenSan Warriors entered the playoffs for the sixth consecutive season.
- The Pampanga Giant Lanterns entered the playoffs for the fifth consecutive season.
- The Nueva Ecija Rice Vanguards entered the playoffs for the fourth consecutive season.
- The Caloocan Batang Kankaloo and Pasay Voyagers entered the playoffs for the third consecutive season.
- The Rizal Golden Coolers and Biñan Tatak Gel entered the playoffs for the second consecutive season.
- The Basilan Starhorse entered the playoffs for the first time since 2020.
- The Mindoro Tamaraws, Ilagan Isabela Cowboys, and Pangasinan Heatwaves entered the playoffs for the first time in franchise history.

=== Division Finals ===
- This is the first playoffs that none of the teams seeded from #2 to #4 of both divisions had advanced to Division Finals. Also, this is the first playoffs not to feature either Batangas or San Juan in Division Finals.

== Format ==
The top six teams from each division advance to the playoffs, while The seventh and eighth-ranked teams will play for the seventh seed in the playoffs. The losing team will face the winner of the game between the ninth and tenth-ranked teams for the eighth seed and the final playoff spot. Due to this change, only the top six teams will directly advance to the playoffs. Seeding is based on wins, with tiebreaker rules applied should multiple teams have the same record. The single-elimination bracket consists of four rounds with no reseeding. The first two rounds being best-of-three series; and the division and national finals being a best-of-five series.

During the first two rounds, two games within the same division are played in a gameday, with homecourt advantage alternating between the higher-seeded teams of each series. A traditional homecourt format is then used for the last two rounds, with the division finals using a 1–1–1 format and the national finals using a 2–2–1 format. The designated home team may not be able to play within its home locality. Should it occur, the gameday may take place elsewhere.

== Division standings ==
North Division

| Pos | Team | Pld | W | L | GB |
|---|---|---|---|---|---|
| 1 | Abra Solid North Weavers | 29 | 28 | 1 | — |
| 2 | Nueva Ecija Rice Vanguards | 29 | 27 | 2 | 1 |
| 3 | San Juan Knights | 29 | 26 | 3 | 2 |
| 4 | Caloocan Batang Kankaloo | 29 | 21 (Note: Caloocan (1.133) wins tiebreaker over Pampanga (1.029), and Pasay (0.886) based on head-to-head point quotient.) | 8 | 7 |
| 5 | Pampanga Giant Lanterns | 29 | 21 | 8 | 7 |
| 6 | Pasay Voyagers | 29 | 21 | 8 | 7 |
| 7 | Pangasinan Heatwaves | 29 | 20 | 9 | 8 |
| 8 | Ilagan Isabela Cowboys | 29 | 15 | 14 | 13 |
| 9 | Bataan Risers | 29 | 13 | 16 | 15 |
| 10 | Pasig City | 29 | 12 | 17 | 16 |

Source: Standings
Notes:

South Division

| Pos | Team | Pld | W | L | GB |
|---|---|---|---|---|---|
| 1 | Quezon Huskers | 29 | 25 | 4 | — |
| 2 | Batangas City Tanduay Rum Masters | 29 | 20 | 9 | 5 |
| 3 | Rizal Golden Coolers | 29 | 19 | 10 | 6 |
| 4 | Basilan Starhorse | 29 | 18 (Note: Basilan wins tiebreaker over General Santos based on head-to-head match-up.) | 11 | 7 |
| 5 | GenSan Warriors | 29 | 18 | 11 | 7 |
| 6 | Biñan Tatak Gel | 29 | 17 (Note: Biñan wins tiebreaker over Zamboanga based on head-to-head match-up.) | 12 | 8 |
| 7 | Zamboanga Sikat | 29 | 17 | 12 | 8 |
| 8 | Mindoro Tamaraws | 29 | 15 | 14 | 10 |
| 9 | Davao Occidental Tigers | 29 | 12 | 17 | 13 |
| 10 | Cebu Greats | 29 | 11 | 18 | 14 |

Source: Standings

== Play-in tournament ==
=== North Division ===
Play-in games
7 | Pangasinan (OT) | 98
8 | Ilagan Isabela | 91
9 | Bataan | 99
10 | Pasig City | 78

No. 8 seed game
8 | Ilagan Isabela | 74
9 | Bataan | 71

Final seeds
7 | Pangasinan | No. 7 seed
8 | Ilagan Isabela | No. 8 seed

Solar Sports

October 2
4:00 p.m.

Boxscore

| Pasig City | 78–99 | Bataan Risers |
Scoring by quarter: 14–21, 16–30, 24–24, 24–24
| Pts: Jacob Galicia 21; Rebs: Warlo Batac 13; Asts: Warlo Batac 5 | | Pts: Yves Sazon 20; Rebs: CJ Javier 9 Asts: Hubert Cani 6 |

Robert B. Estrella Sr. Memorial Stadium, Rosales, Pangasinan
Referees: Jay Castroverde, Severino Pingol, Karina Martin

Solar Sports

October 2
6:00 p.m.

Boxscore

| Pangasinan Heatwaves | 98–91 (OT) | Ilagan Isabela Cowboys |
Scoring by quarter: 28–19, 17–19, 13–25, 24–19, Overtime: 16–9
| Pts: Pedrito Galanza 23; Rebs: JP Maguliano 11; Asts: Hesed Gabo 9 | | Pts: Arth dela Cruz 21; Rebs: Terrence Tumalip 8 Asts: Arth dela Cruz 8 |
Pangasinan wins the 7th seed.

Robert B. Estrella Sr. Memorial Stadium, Rosales, Pangasinan
Referees: Hallyric Damicog, Efren Aganan, Ronn Ivan Baluyot

Solar Sports

October 8
6:00 p.m.

Boxscore

| Ilagan Isabela Cowboys | 74–71 | Bataan Risers |
Scoring by quarter: 21–10, 15–26, 22–17, 16–18
| Pts: Donald Gumaru 19; Rebs: Terrence Tumalip 10; Asts: Agem Miranda 6 | | Pts: John Lorenz Capulong 16; Rebs: John Lorenz Capulong 10; Asts: Edrian Ramirez 6 |
Ilagan Isabela wins the 8th seed.

Capital Arena, Ilagan, Isabela
Referees: Allan Manzano, Jay Castroverde, Edmar Avis

=== South Division ===
Play-in games
7 | Zamboanga | 71
8 | Mindoro | 62
9 | Davao Occidental | 57
10 | Cebu | 65

No. 8 seed game
8 | Mindoro | 92
10 | Cebu | 89

Final seeds
7 | Zamboanga | No. 7 seed
8 | Mindoro | No. 8 seed

Solar Sports

October 4
4:00 p.m.

Boxscore

| Cebu Greats | 65–57 | Davao Occidental Tigers |
Scoring by quarter: 15–12, 13–15, 15–12, 22–18
| Pts: Paul Desiderio, Jun Manzo 15; Rebs: Mark Meneses 22; Asts: Paul Desiderio 6 | | Pts: Jefferson Comia 26; Rebs: Jefferson Comia 8 Asts: Joseph Terso 5 |

Pola Gymnasium, Pola, Oriental Mindoro

Solar Sports

October 4
6:00 p.m.

Boxscore

| Mindoro Tamaraws | 62–68 | Zamboanga Sikat |
Scoring by quarter: 14–13, 17–19, 14–19, 17–17
| Pts: Bambam Gamalinda 16; Rebs: Bambam Gamalinda 10; Asts: Axel Iñigo, Jeco Bancale 4 | | Pts: Abdul Sawat 17; Rebs: Abdul Sawat 12; Asts: Michael Are 6 |
Zamboanga wins the 7th seed.

Pola Gymnasium, Pola, Oriental Mindoro

Solar Sports

October 6
6:00 p.m.

Boxscore

| Mindoro Tamaraws | 92–89 | Cebu Greats |
Scoring by quarter: 28–20, 13–19, 21–23, 30–27
| Pts: Bambam Gamalinda, Wendel Comboy 18; Rebs: Jonas Tibayan 11; Asts: Jeffrey Ramirez 8 | | Pts: Andres Desiderio 15; Rebs: Mark Meneses 16; Asts: Jun Manzo 7 |
Mindoro wins the 8th seed.

Pola Gymnasium, Pola, Oriental Mindoro

== Bracket ==
Teams in bold advanced to the next round. Teams in italics have homecourt advantage for the series. The numbers to the left of each team indicate the team's seeding in its division, while the numbers to the right indicate the number of games the team won in that round.

Division quarterfinals (best-of-3) | Division semifinals (best-of-3)
N1 | **Abra** | **2**
N8 | Ilagan Isabela | 0
N1 | **Abra** | **2**
N4 | Caloocan | 0
N4 | **Caloocan** | **2**
N5 | Pampanga | 0
**North Division**
N2 | Nueva Ecija | 1
N7 | **Pangasinan** | **2**
N7 | **Pangasinan** | **2**
N3 | San Juan | 1
N3 | **San Juan** | **2**
N6 | Pasay | 0
S1 | **Quezon** | **2**
S8 | Mindoro | 0
S1 | **Quezon** | **2**
S5 | General Santos | 0
S4 | Basilan | 1
S5 | **General Santos** | **2**
**South Division**
S2 | **Batangas City** | **2**
S7 | Zamboanga | 1
S2 | Batangas City | 1
S6 | **Biñan** | **2**
S3 | Rizal | 0
S6 | **Biñan** | **2**

Division finals (best-of-5)
N1 | **Abra** | **3**
N7 | Pangasinan | 0
S1 | **Quezon** | **3**
S6 | Biñan | 2

National finals (best-of-5)
N1 | **Abra** | **3**
S1 | Quezon | 0

== Division quarterfinals ==
NOTE: All times are Philippine Standard Time (UTC+8:00).

=== North Division quarterfinals ===
==== (1) Abra Weavers vs. (8) Ilagan Isabela Cowboys ====
Solar Sports

October 10
6:00 p.m.

Boxscore

| Abra Weavers | 98–58 | Ilagan Isabela Cowboys |
Scoring by quarter: 22–11, 30–9, 31–17, 15–21
| Pts: Mike Ayonayon 16; Rebs: Geo Chiu 9 Asts: Jason Brickman 7 | | Pts: Jayboy Solis 18; Rebs: Agem Miranda, Terrence Tumalip 5 Asts: Terrence Tumalip 4 |
Abra leads series, 1–0

University of Bangued Gymnasium, Bangued, Abra

Solar Sports

October 18
6:00 p.m.

Boxscore

| Ilagan Isabela Cowboys | 69–73 | Abra Weavers |
Scoring by quarter: 12–11, 22–18, 18–17, 17–27
| Pts: Agem Miranda 15; Rebs: Donald Gumaru 8 Asts: Agem Miranda, Donald Gumaru 5 | | Pts: Dave Ildefonso 17; Rebs: Dave Ildefonso 9 Asts: Marwin Taywan 5 |
Abra wins series, 2–0

Caloocan Sports Complex, Caloocan

Head-to-head matchup

Solar Sports

August 16
6:00 p.m.

Boxscore

| Abra Weavers | 76–59 | Ilagan Isabela Cowboys |
Scoring by quarter: 22–15, 22–13, 20–12, 12–19
| Pts: Dave Ildefonso 20; Rebs: John Uduba 16; Asts: Marwin Taywan 6 | | Pts: Donald Gumaru 11; Rebs: Arth dela Cruz 8 Asts: Arth dela Cruz 6 |

Quezon Convention Center, Lucena

This is the first playoff meeting between Abra and Ilagan Isabela.

==== (2) Nueva Ecija Rice Vanguards vs. (7) Pangasinan Heatwaves ====
Solar Sports

October 15
8:00 p.m.

Boxscore

| Nueva Ecija Rice Vanguards | 85–86 | Pangasinan Heatwaves |
Scoring by quarter: 15–19, 22–21, 23–28, 25–18
| Pts: Will McAloney 17; Rebs: Will McAloney 10; Asts: Robby Celiz 6 | | Pts: Vic Manuel 16; Rebs: Michael Mabulac 10; Asts: Hesed Gabo 5 |
Pangasinan leads series, 1–0

Nueva Ecija Coliseum, Palayan, Nueva Ecija

Solar Sports

October 22
6:00 p.m.

Boxscore

| Pangasinan Heatwaves | 72–82 | Nueva Ecija Rice Vanguards |
Scoring by quarter: 27–17, 18–27, 19–21, 8–17
| Pts: Hesed Gabo 13; Rebs: Vic Manuel, Michael Mabulac 6 Asts: Michael Mabulac 9 | | Pts: Will McAloney 24; Rebs: John Wilson, Robby Celiz 11; Asts: three players 4 |
Series tied, 1–1

Ynares Sports Arena, Pasig

Solar Sports

October 28
7:00 p.m.

Boxscore

| Nueva Ecija Rice Vanguards | 80–82 | Pangasinan Heatwaves |
Scoring by quarter: 21–17, 21–23, 21–18, 17–24
| Pts: Will McAloney 14; Rebs: Will McAloney 16; Asts: Jaycee Marcelino 6 | | Pts: Vic Manuel, Hesed Gabo 15; Rebs: Jorey Napoles, Michael Mabulac 7 Asts: Hesed Gabo 5 |
Pangasinan wins series, 2–1

Nueva Ecija Coliseum, Palayan, Nueva Ecija

Head-to-head matchup

Solar Sports

April 25
8:00 p.m.

Boxscore

| Pangasinan Heatwaves | 94–101 (OT) | Nueva Ecija Rice Vanguards |
Scoring by quarter: 15– 26, 14–23, 32–24, 27–15, Overtime: 6–13
| Pts: Vic Manuel 27; Rebs: Michael Mabulac 10; Asts: Hesed Gabo 9 | | Pts: Robby Celiz 19; Rebs: Robby Celiz 11; Asts: Jaycee Marcelino 6 |

Calasiao Sports Complex, Calasiao, Pangasinan

This is the first playoff meeting between Nueva Ecija and Pangasinan

==== (3) San Juan Knights vs. (6) Pasay Voyagers ====
Solar Sports

October 15
4:00 p.m.

Boxscore

| Pasay Voyagers | 89–94 (2OT) | San Juan Knights |
Scoring by quarter: 13–30, 21–21, 23–11, 20–15, Overtime: 12–17
| Pts: Christian Fajarito 20; Rebs: Marc Sangco 12; Asts: Cyrus Tabi 7 | | Pts: AC Soberano 24; Rebs: Raul Soyud 11; Asts: Orlan Wamar Jr. 7 |
San Juan leads series, 1–0

Nueva Ecija Coliseum, Palayan, Nueva Ecija

Solar Sports

October 22
8:00 p.m.

Boxscore

| San Juan Knights | 77–66 | Pasay Voyagers |
Scoring by quarter: 17–11, 20–16, 21–22, 19–17
| Pts: Raul Soyud 17; Rebs: Raul Soyud 13; Asts: three players 4 | | Pts: Christian Fajarito 23; Rebs: Marc Sangco 13; Asts: Cyrus Tabi 5 |
San Juan wins series, 2–0

Ynares Sports Arena, Pasig

Head-to-head matchup

Solar Sports

May 8
8:00 p.m.

Boxscore

| Pasay Voyagers | 74–75 | San Juan Knights |
Scoring by quarter: 20–18, 14–16, 21–24, 19–17
| Pts: Laurenz Victoria 20; Rebs: Cyrus Tabi 7 Asts: Cyrus Tabi 6 | | Pts: Michael Calisaan 16; Rebs: Michael Calisaan 11; Asts: Orlan Wamar, Jr. 5 |

Cuneta Astrodome, Pasay

This is the second playoff meeting between San Juan and Pasay.

Previous playoffs series
San Juan 1–0 in all-time playoff series

2020

San Juan Knights 2, Pasay Voyagers 0

2020 Northern Division quarterfinals

==== (4) Caloocan Batang Kankaloo vs. (5) Pampanga Giant Lanterns ====
Solar Sports

October 10
4:00 p.m.

Boxscore

| Pampanga Giant Lanterns | 61–65 | Caloocan Batang Kankaloo |
Scoring by quarter: 8–20, 11–11, 26–15, 16–19
| Pts: Archie Concepcion 16; Rebs: Larry Muyang 15; Asts: Raymond Binuya 5 | | Pts: Rommel Calahat 18; Rebs: Antonio Bonsubre 11; Asts: three players 4 |
Caloocan leads series, 1–0

University of Bangued Gymnasium, Bangued, Abra

Solar Sports

October 18
8:00 p.m.

Boxscore

| Caloocan Batang Kankaloo | 81–71 | Pampanga Giant Lanterns |
Scoring by quarter: 16–25, 19–23 , 29–5, 17–18
| Pts: Jeff Manday 19; Rebs: Antonio Bonsubre Jr. 7 Asts: Antonio Bonsubre, Jr., Ronnie Matias 6 | | Pts: Jhan Nermal 15; Rebs: Larry Muyang 13; Asts: Raymond Binuya 6 |
Caloocan wins series, 2–0

Caloocan Sports Complex, Caloocan

Head-to-head matchup

Solar Sports

May 19
6:00 p.m.

Boxscore

| Pampanga Giant Lanterns | 87–90 | Caloocan Batang Kankaloo |
Scoring by quarter: 10–27, 23–20, 28–22, 26–21
| Pts: Larry Muyang 24; Rebs: Larry Muyang 12; Asts: Andrey Armenion, CJ Delfino 5 | | Pts: Paul Sanga 19; Rebs: Ronnie Matias 9 Asts: Joco Tayongtong 6 |

Orion Sports Complex, Orion, Bataan

This is the second playoff meeting Caloocan and Pampanga.

Previous playoffs series
Pampanga 1–0 in all-time playoff series

2023

Pampanga Giant Lanterns 2, Caloocan Batang Kankaloo 0

2023 Northern Division semifinals

=== South Division quarterfinals ===
==== (1) Quezon Huskers vs. (8) Mindoro Tamaraws ====
Solar Sports

October 13
6:00 p.m.

Boxscore

| Quezon Huskers | 83–74 | Mindoro Tamaraws |
Scoring by quarter: 10–12, 29–23, 23–21, 21–18
| Pts: Gab Banal 19; Rebs: LJay Gonzales 11; Asts: LJay Gonzales 13 | | Pts: Bambam Gamalinda 14; Rebs: Marion Magat 8 Asts: RJ Ramirez, Wendell Comboy 3 |
Quezon leads series, 1–0

Quezon Convention Center, Lucena

Solar Sports

October 20
5:00 p.m.

Boxscore

| Mindoro Tamaraws | 102–104 (2OT) | Quezon Huskers |
Scoring by quarter: 26–19, 20–20, 22–22, 16–23, Overtime: 20–18
| Pts: RJ Ramirez 25; Rebs: Ashon Andrews 13; Asts: Bambam Gamalinda 5 | | Pts: Judel Fuentes 21; Rebs: LJay Gonzales 12; Asts: LJay Gonzales 8 |
Quezon wins series, 2–0

Malolos Convention and Sports Center, Malolos, Bulacan

Head-to-head matchup

Solar Sports

September 1
6:00 p.m.

Boxscore

| Quezon Huskers | 88–72 | Mindoro Tamaraws |
Scoring by quarter: 18–17, 32–18, 22–12, 16–25
| Pts: Christopher Lagrama 14; Rebs: Jason Opiso 10; Asts: LJay Gonzales 6 | | Pts: Jeco Bancale 16; Rebs: four players 5 Asts: Joseph Sedurifa 4 |

Paco Arena, Paco, Manila

This is the first playoff meeting between Quezon and Mindoro.

==== (2) Batangas City Tanduay Rum Masters vs. (7) Zamboanga Sikat ====
Solar Sports

October 16
8:00 p.m.

Boxscore

| Batangas City Tanduay Rum Masters | 70–61 | Zamboanga Sikat |
Scoring by quarter: 15–17, 14–18, 21–11, 20–15
| Pts: Cedrick Ablaza 16; Rebs: Jeckster Apinan 12; Asts: Vincent Importante 4 | | Pts: Reggz Gabat 12; Rebs: Abdul Sawat 7 Asts: Abdul Sawat 4 |
Batangas City leads series, 1–0

Batangas City Coliseum, Batangas City

Solar Sports

October 23
6:00 p.m.

Boxscore

| Zamboanga Sikat | 78–72 | Batangas City Tanduay Rum Masters |
Scoring by quarter: 24–16, 18–16, 21–14, 15–26
| Pts: JP Cauilan 17; Rebs: Rafael Are 5 Asts: JP Cauilan 3 | | Pts: Levi Hernandez 21; Rebs: Cedric Ablaza 11; Asts: Vincent Importante 4 |
Series tied, 1–1

Ynares Center Montalban, Rodriguez, Rizal

Solar Sports

October 30
6:00 p.m.

Boxscore

| Batangas City Tanduay Rum Masters | 95–87 | Zamboanga Sikat |
Scoring by quarter: 15–23, 21–21, 31–26, 28–12
| Pts: Levi Hernandez 29; Rebs: Cedrick Alblaza 8 Asts: three players 5 | | Pts: Reggz Gabat 13; Rebs: Reggz Gabat 6 Asts: Chino Mosqueda 5 |
Batangas City wins series, 2–1

Batangas Province Events Center, Batangas City

Head-to-head matchup

Solar Sports

June 6
6:00 p.m.

Boxscore

| Zamboanga Sikat | 87–82 | Batangas City Tanduay Rum Masters |
Scoring by quarter: 19–21, 21–20, 25–14, 22–27
| Pts: Camillus Altamirano, Reggz Gabat 17; Rebs: Abdul Sawat 8 Asts: Abdul Sawat 7 | | Pts: Juneric Baloria 16; Rebs: Cedric Ablaza 8 Asts: Carlos Isit 8 |

Bren Z. Guiao Convention Center, San Fernando, Pampanga

This is the four playoff meeting between Zamboanga and Batangas City, with Zamboanga leads the last two all-time playoff series.

Previous playoffs series
Zamboanga leads 2–1 in all-time playoff series

2019

Batangas City Athletics 2, Zamboanga Family's Brand Sardines 1

2019 Southern Division semifinals

2020

Batangas City Athletics 1, Zamboanga Family's Brand Sardines 2

2020 Southern Division quarterfinals

2022

Zamboanga Family's Brand Sardines 2, Batangas City Embassy Chill 1

2022 Southern Division finals

==== (3) Rizal Golden Coolers vs. (6) Biñan Tatak Gel ====
Solar Sports

October 16
6:00 p.m.

Boxscore

| Biñan Tatak Gel | 77–68 | Rizal Golden Coolers |
Scoring by quarter: 18–15, 25–17, 14–17, 20–19
| Pts: Carlo Lastimosa 16; Rebs: Carlo Lastimosa 10; Asts: Kenny Rocacurva 5 | | Pts: Alwyn Alday 19; Rebs: Eric Camson 8 Asts: Keanu Caballero 6 |
Biñan leads series, 1–0

Batangas City Coliseum, Batangas City

Solar Sports

October 23
8:00 p.m.

Boxscore

| Rizal Golden Coolers | 72–81 | Biñan Tatak Gel |
Scoring by quarter: 21–21, 20–17, 11–23, 20–20
| Pts: Samboy de Leon 19; Rebs: Eric Camson 12; Asts: Philip Manalang 6 | | Pts: Kenny Rocacurva 21; Rebs: Marc Pingris 7 Asts: Pamboy Raymundo 4 |
Biñan wins series, 2–0

Ynares Center Montalban, Rodriguez, Rizal

Head-to-head matchup

Solar Sports

May 21
8:00 p.m.

Boxscore

| Biñan Tatak Gel | 66–63 | Rizal Golden Coolers |
Scoring by quarter: 16–13, 22–12, 16–20, 12–18
| Pts: Kenny Rocacurva 16; Rebs: Joseph Peñaredondo 8 Asts: Pamboy Raymundo 5 | | Pts: Michael Cañete 13; Rebs: Samboy de Leon 8 Asts: Keanu Caballero 3 |

Alonte Sports Arena, Biñan, Laguna

This is the first playoff meeting between Rizal and Biñan.

==== (4) Basilan Starhorse vs. (5) GenSan Warriors ====
Solar Sports

October 13
4:00 p.m.

Boxscore

| GenSan Warriors | 85–78 | Basilan Starhorse |
Scoring by quarter: 23–19, 15–22, 26–13, 21–24
| Pts: Kyle Tolentino 17; Rebs: Marwin Dionisio 9 Asts: Kyle Tolentino 6 | | Pts: Gab Dagangon 20; Rebs: Alex Cabagnot 11; Asts: Alex Cabagnot 7 |
General Santos leads series, 1–0

Quezon Convention Center, Lucena

Solar Sports

October 20
7:00 p.m.

Boxscore

| Basilan Starhorse | 116–114 (2OT) | GenSan Warriors |
Scoring by quarter: 17–24, 27–17, 22–13, 33–45, Overtime: 17–15
| Pts: Sherwin Concepcion 26; Rebs: Sherwin Concepcion 14; Asts: Emman Calo 12 | | Pts: Jack Corpuz 27; Rebs: Jack Corpuz 16; Asts: Eloie Tan 8 |
Series tied, 1–1

Malolos Convention and Sports Center, Malolos, Bulacan

Solar Sports

October 24
6:00 p.m.

Boxscore

| Basilan Starhorse | 67–79 | GenSan Warriors |
Scoring by quarter: 14–13, 23–21, 21–23, 9–21
| Pts: Alex Cabagnot 18; Rebs: Sherwin Concepcion 8 Asts: Emman Calo, Jimboy Pasturan 3 | | Pts: Mark Cruz, Jack Corpuz 15; Rebs: Jack Corpuz 13; Asts: Larry Rodriguez 7 |
General Santos wins series, 2–1

Olivarez College Gym, Parañaque

Head-to-head matchup

Solar Sports

May 21
6:00 p.m.

Boxscore

| Basilan Starhorse | 75–72 | GenSan Warriors |
Scoring by quarter: 22–11, 15–19, 21–16, 17–26
| Pts: Adrian Santos 20; Rebs: Gab Dagangon 9 Asts: Reymar Caduyac 8 | | Pts: Val Acuña 23; Rebs: Kyle Tolentino 9 Asts: three players 4 |

Alonte Sports Arena, Biñan, Laguna

This is the first playoff meeting between Basilan and General Santos.

== Division semifinals ==
NOTE: All times are Philippine Standard Time (UTC+8:00).

=== North Division semifinals ===
==== (1) Abra Weavers vs. (4) Caloocan Batang Kankaloo ====
Solar Sports

November 4
8:00 p.m.

Boxscore

| Abra Weavers | 80–54 | Caloocan Batang Kankaloo |
Scoring by quarter: 22–14, 16–16, 23–10, 19–14
| Pts: Jason Brickman 13; Rebs: Geo Chiu 10; Asts: Jason Brickman, Dave Ildefonso 5 | | Pts: Jeff Manday 14; Rebs: Antonio Bonsubre Jr. 16; Asts: Chris Bitoon 5 |
Abra leads series, 1–0

University of Bangued Gymnasium, Bangued, Abra

Solar Sports

November 7
4:00 p.m.

Boxscore

| Caloocan Batang Kankaloo | 62–74 | Abra Weavers |
Scoring by quarter: 14–24, 20–19, 13–16, 15–15
| Pts: three players 9 Rebs: Antonio Bonsubre Jr. 10; Asts: Chris Bitoon, Jeff Manday 4 | | Pts: Jason Brickman 18; Rebs: Geo Chiu 12; Asts: Jason Brickman, Dave Ildefonso 5 |
Abra wins series, 2–0

Ynares Sports Arena, Pasig

Head-to-head matchup

Solar Sports

June 28
6:00 p.m.

Boxscore

| Caloocan Batang Kankaloo | 66–78 | Abra Weavers |
Scoring by quarter: 22–24, 13–22, 19–19, 12–13
| Pts: Jeramer Cabanag 14; Rebs: Antonio Bonsubre, Jr., Reil Cervantes 9 Asts: Jeff Manday 5 | | Pts: Dave Ildefonso 20; Rebs: Ryan Batino 9 Asts: Marwin Taywan 5 |

Capital Arena, Ilagan, Isabela

This is the first playoff meeting between Abra and Caloocan.

==== (3) San Juan Knights vs. (7) Pangasinan Heatwaves ====
Solar Sports

November 4
4:00 p.m.

Boxscore

| San Juan Knights | 57–67 | Pangasinan Heatwaves |
Scoring by quarter: 17–17, 14–19, 11–13, 15–18
| Pts: Nikko Panganiban 15; Rebs: four players 5 Asts: Orlan Wamar Jr. 7 | | Pts: Jorey Napoles 16; Rebs: Allyn Bulanadi, Michael Mabulac 6 Asts: three players 4 |
Pangasinan leads series, 1–0

University of Bangued Gymnasium, Bangued, Abra

Solar Sports

November 7
6:00 p.m.

Boxscore

| Pangasinan Heatwaves | 66–83 | San Juan Knights |
Scoring by quarter: 17–22, 11–17, 7–30, 31–14
| Pts: Allyn Bulanadi 11; Rebs: Hesed Gabo 7 Asts: Hesed Gabo 5 | | Pts: Orlan Wamar Jr. 24; Rebs: Nikko Panganiban 8 Asts: Orlan Wamar Jr. 4 |
Series tied, 1–1

Ynares Sports Arena, Pasig

Solar Sports

November 13
7:00 p.m.

Boxscore

| San Juan Knights | 80–83 | Pangasinan Heatwaves |
Scoring by quarter: 17–30, 23–17, 22–15, 18–21
| Pts: Arvin Gamboa 16; Rebs: Arvin Gamboa 14; Asts: Arvin Gamboa 6 | | Pts: Vic Manuel 21; Rebs: Michael Mabulac 10; Asts: Ian Melencio, Hesed Gabo 5 |
Pangasinan wins series, 2–1

Playtime Filoil Centre, San Juan

Head-to-head matchup

Solar Sports

June 26
8:00 p.m.

Boxscore

| San Juan Knights | 73–66 | Pangasinan Heatwaves |
Scoring by quarter: 17–20, 19–11, 20–13, 17–22
| Pts: Michael Calisaan 11; Rebs: Dexter Maiquez 9 Asts: JC Cullar 5 | | Pts: Vic Manuel 18; Rebs: Jorey Napoles 10; Asts: Kris Pagsanjan 8 |

Playtime Filoil Centre, San Juan

This is the first playoff meeting between San Juan and Pangasinan.

=== South Division semifinals ===
==== (1) Quezon Huskers vs. (5) GenSan Warriors ====
Solar Sports

November 6
6:00 p.m.

Boxscore

| Quezon Huskers | 103–75 | GenSan Warriors |
Scoring by quarter: 30–10, 26–20, 23–27, 24–18
| Pts: Judel Fuentes 19; Rebs: LJay Gonzales 7 Asts: Gab Banal 8 | | Pts: Joel Lee Yu 18; Rebs: Nico Elorde 7 Asts: Nico Elorde 2 |
Quezon leads series, 1–0

Quezon Convention Center, Lucena

Solar Sports

November 11
6:00 p.m.

Boxscore

| GenSan Warriors | 85–95 | Quezon Huskers |
Scoring by quarter: 26–26, 20–20, 17–25, 22–24
| Pts: Jack Corpuz, Kyle Tolentino 14; Rebs: Marwin Dionisio 7 Asts: Jack Corpuz 5 | | Pts: LJay Gonzales 14; Rebs: Jason Opiso 7 Asts: LJay Gonzales, Vince Magbuhos 5 |
Quezon wins series, 2–0

Batangas City Coliseum, Batangas City

Head-to-head matchup

Solar Sports

July 1
8:00 p.m.

Boxscore

| Quezon Huskers | 86–82 | GenSan Warriors |
Scoring by quarter: 23–17, 28–23, 17–17, 18–25
| Pts: Judel Fuentes 22; Rebs: LJay Gonzales 10; Asts: Gab Banal, LJay Gonzales 5 | | Pts: Joel Lee Yu 17; Rebs: Kyle Tolentino 14; Asts: Kyle Tolentino 4 |

Quezon Convention Center, Lucena

This is the first playoff meeting between Quezon and General Santos.

==== (2) Batangas City Tanduay Rum Masters vs. (6) Biñan Tatak Gel ====
Solar Sports

November 6
6:00 p.m.

Boxscore

| Biñan Tatak Gel | 72–67 | Batangas City Tanduay Rum Masters |
Scoring by quarter: 17–9, 16–20, 25–20, 14–18
| Pts: Kenny Rocacurva 18; Rebs: Marc Pingris 8 Asts: Pamboy Raymundo 4 | | Pts: Juneric Baloria 15; Rebs: Levi Hernandez 6 Asts: five players 3 |
Biñan leads series, 1–0

Quezon Convention Center, Lucena

Solar Sports

November 14
8:00 p.m.

Boxscore

| Batangas City Tanduay Rum Masters | 70–62 | Biñan Tatak Gel |
Scoring by quarter: 11–12, 18–15, 18–20, 23–15
| Pts: Juneric Baloria 13; Rebs: Dawn Ochea 11; Asts: Philip Paniamogan 6 | | Pts: Carlo Lastimosa 14; Rebs: Kenny Rocacurva 8 Asts: Pamboy Raymundo 6 |
Series tied, 1–1

Batangas Province Events Center, Batangas City

Solar Sports

November 17
7:00 p.m.

Boxscore

| Batangas City Tanduay Rum Masters | 75–80 | Biñan Tatak Gel |
Scoring by quarter: 19–18, 18–14, 18–21, 20–27
| Pts: Juneric Baloria 15; Rebs: Cedric Ablaza 11; Asts: CJ Isit 7 | | Pts: Kenny Rocacurva 24; Rebs: Marc Pingris 10; Asts: Pamboy Raymundo, Jaymar Gimpayan 4 |
Biñan wins series, 2–1

Batangas Province Events Center, Batangas City

Head-to-head matchup

Solar Sports

June 25
8:00 p.m.

Boxscore

| Biñan Tatak Gel | 68–74 | Batangas City Tanduay Rum Masters |
Scoring by quarter: 11–11, 19–20, 20–21, 18–22
| Pts: Kenny Rocacurva 13; Rebs: Marc Pingris 8 Asts: Pamboy Raymundo 4 | | Pts: Levi Hernandez 21; Rebs: Jeckster Apinan 9 Asts: CJ Isit 10 |

Alonte Sports Arena, Biñan, Laguna

This is the first playoff meeting between Batangas City and Biñan.

== Division finals ==
NOTE: All times are Philippine Standard Time (UTC+8:00).

=== North Division finals: (1) Abra Weavers vs. (7) Pangasinan Heatwaves ===
The first division final playoff where doesn't feature San Juan Knights since entered the playoffs in 2019.

Solar Sports

November 19
6:30 p.m.

Boxscore

| Abra Weavers | 77–58 | Pangasinan Heatwaves |
Scoring by quarter: 10–11, 24–6, 17–19, 26–22
| Pts: Jason Brickman 15; Rebs: Dave Ildefonso 10; Asts: Jason Brickman, Mike Ayonayon 5 | | Pts: Vic Manuel 18; Rebs: Ian Melencio 8 Asts: Mike Digregorio 5 |
Abra leads series, 1–0

University of Bangued Gymnasium, Bangued, Abra

Solar Sports

November 21
6:30 p.m.

Boxscore

| Abra Weavers | 66–59 | Pangasinan Heatwaves |
Scoring by quarter: 16–16, 18–14, 15–8, 17–21
| Pts: Mike Ayonayon 12; Rebs: Dave Ildefonso 15; Asts: Jason Brickman 6 | | Pts: Jorey Napoles 14; Rebs: Michael Mabulac 11; Asts: Hesed Gabo 6 |
Abra leads series, 2–0

University of Bangued Gymnasium, Bangued, Abra

Solar Sports

November 27
6:30 p.m.

Boxscore

| Pangasinan Heatwaves | 74–99 | Abra Weavers |
Scoring by quarter: 17–25, 19–18, 15–29, 23–27
| Pts: Allyn Bulanadi, Jay Collado 10; Rebs: Allyn Bulanadi, JP Maguliano 5 Asts: Allyn Bulanadi, Hesed Gabo 5 | | Pts: Dave Ildefonso 18; Rebs: Dave Ildefonso 14; Asts: Jason Brickman, Marwin Taywan 7 |
Abra wins series, 3–0

Robert B. Estrella Sr. Memorial Stadium, Rosales, Pangasinan

Head-to-head matchup

Solar Sports

June 14
8:00 p.m.

Boxscore

| Abra Weavers | 75–68 | Pangasinan Heatwaves |
Scoring by quarter: 29–19, 14–19, 22–14, 10–16
| Pts: Dave Ildefonso 18; Rebs: CJ Austria 9 Asts: Marwin Taywan 9 | | Pts: Hesed Gabo 16; Rebs: Jorey Napoles 8 Asts: Hesed Gabo 5 |

University of Bangued Gymnasium, Bangued, Abra

This is the first playoff meeting between Abra and Pangasinan.

=== South Division finals: (1) Quezon Huskers vs. (6) Biñan Tatak Gel ===
The first Division Finals not to feature Batangas City Tanduay Rum Masters since 2021 (Season 3).

Solar Sports

November 24
6:30 p.m.

Boxscore

| Quezon Huskers | 57–55 | Biñan Tatak Gel |
Scoring by quarter: 19–12, 13–16, 18–10, 7–17
| Pts: Judel Fuentes 13; Rebs: Vince Magbuhos 12; Asts: LJay Gonzales 5 | | Pts: Warren Bonifacio 13; Rebs: Warren Bonifacio 9 Asts: three players 2 |
Quezon leads series, 1–0

Quezon Convention Center, Lucena

Solar Sports

November 26
6:30 p.m.

Boxscore

| Quezon Huskers | 65–68 | Biñan Tatak Gel |
Scoring by quarter: 18–19, 20–20, 7–16, 20–13
| Pts: Judel Fuentes 22; Rebs: Judel Fuentes 6 Asts: LJay Gonzales 11 | | Pts: Carlo Lastimosa 21; Rebs: Marc Pingris, Kenny Rocacurva 8 Asts: Renzo Subido 5 |
Series tied, 1–1

Lucena Convention Center, Lucena

Solar Sports

December 1
7:00 p.m.

Boxscore

| Biñan Tatak Gel | 56–66 | Quezon Huskers |
Scoring by quarter: 14–20, 24–18, 7–18, 11–10
| Pts: Pamboy Raymundo, Kenny Rocacurva 11; Rebs: Carlo Lastimosa, Kenny Rocacurva 7 Asts: Pamboy Raymundo 4 | | Pts: LJay Gonzales 26; Rebs: Joseph Gabayni 7 Asts: LJay Gonzales 6 |
Quezon leads series, 2–1

Alonte Sports Arena, Biñan, Laguna

Solar Sports

December 3
6:30 p.m.

Boxscore

| Biñan Tatak Gel | 57–53 | Quezon Huskers |
Scoring by quarter: 14–6, 13–10, 14–16, 16–21
| Pts: Kenny Rocacurva 11; Rebs: Marc Pingris, Jaymar Gimpayan 11; Asts: Warren Bonifacio 5 | | Pts: LJay Gonzales 15; Rebs: Vince Magbuhos 6 Asts: LJay Gonzales 5 |
Series tied, 2–2

Playtime Filoil Centre, San Juan

Solar Sports

December 6
6:30 p.m.

Boxscore

| Quezon Huskers | 56–49 | Biñan Tatak Gel |
Scoring by quarter: 14–16, 11–14, 13–6, 18–13
| Pts: LJay Gonzales 14; Rebs: Joseph Gabayni, Vince Magbuhos 9 Asts: Mon Abundo 4 | | Pts: Pamboy Raymundo 10; Rebs: Kenny Rocacurva 10; Asts: Kenny Rocacurva 3 |
Quezon wins series, 3–2

Quezon Convention Center, Lucena

Head-to-head matchup

Solar Sports

March 22
8:00 p.m.

Boxscore

| Quezon Huskers | 79–64 | Biñan Tatak Gel |
Scoring by quarter: 22–12, 26–18, 15–22, 16–12
| Pts: Al Francis Tamsi 16; Rebs: Joseph Gabayni 6 Asts: Christopher Lagrama 5 | | Pts: Pamboy Raymundo 12; Rebs: Kenny Rocacurva 8 Asts: Renzo Subido 7 |

Quezon Convention Center, Lucena

This is the first playoff meeting between Quezon and Biñan.

== MPBL finals: (N1) Abra Weavers vs. (S1) Quezon Huskers ==
NOTE: All times are Philippine Standard Time (UTC+8:00).

Solar Sports

December 11
7:00 p.m.

Boxscore

| Abra Weavers | 81–80 (OT) | Quezon Huskers |
Scoring by quarter: 19–22, 12–11, 23–20, 18–19, Overtime: 9–8
| Pts: Jason Brickman 15; Rebs: John Uduba 8 Asts: Jason Brickman 6 | | Pts: Christian Pagaran 20; Rebs: Joseph Gabayni 10; Asts: LJay Gonzales 4 |
Abra leads series, 1–0

University of Bangued Gymnasium, Bangued, Abra

Solar Sports

December 13
7:00 p.m.

Boxscore

| Quezon Huskers | 58–62 | Abra Weavers |
Scoring by quarter: 14–14, 14–14, 15–20, 15–14
| Pts: LJay Gonzales 15; Rebs: Vince Magbuhos 10; Asts: Gab Banal 4 | | Pts: Dave Ildefonso, Jason Brickman 14; Rebs: Dave Ildefonso 13; Asts: Encho Serrano 4 |
Abra leads series, 2–0

University of Bangued Gymnasium, Bangued, Abra

Solar Sports

December 16
7:00 p.m.

Boxscore

| Quezon Huskers | 85–94 (OT) | Abra Weavers |
Scoring by quarter: 16–17, 19–21, 20–18, 20–19, Overtime: 10–19
| Pts: Judel Fuentes 15; Rebs: Ximone Sandagon 9 Asts: LJay Gonzales 11 | | Pts: Dave Ildefonso 23; Rebs: Dave Ildefonso, John Uduba 10; Asts: Jason Brickman 5 |
Abra wins series, 3–0

Quezon Convention Center, Lucena

This is the first championship meeting between Abra and Quezon.

=== Head-to-head matchup ===
Solar Sports

May 31
08:00 pm

Boxscore

| Abra Weavers | 63–53 | Quezon Huskers |
Scoring by quarter: 11–11, 23–19, 17–10, 12–13
| Pts: Dave Ildefonso 25; Rebs: Encho Serrano 11; Asts: Encho Serrano 4 | | Pts: Judel Fuentes 15; Rebs: Joseph Gabayni 9 Asts: LJay Gonzales, Diego Dario 3 |

University of Bangued Gymnasium, Bangued, Abra
