= List of MPBL awards =

The Maharlika Pilipinas Basketball League (MPBL) presents ten annual awards to recognize its teams, players, and coaches for their accomplishments. This does not include the three team trophies the league gives out to division champions and league champions as well as the All-MPBL Teams.

The MPBL holds an awarding ceremony during the national finals of every season since 2019. This is where most of the awards are given out with the exclusion of the Finals MVP and Coach of the Year, which are presented at the conclusion of the finals.

== History ==
The MPBL has been presenting awards in every season since the league's establishment, but in the beginning there was only one, that being the Finals Most Valuable Player, first given out after the 2018 MPBL finals.

The 2018–19 season introduced a multitude of awards, with the first being the All-Star Game Most Valuable Player, first presented the inaugural All-Star Game. This is then followed by the Most Valuable Player, Defensive Player of the Year, Executive of the Year, and sportsmanship awards, which were all presented during the 2019 MPBL finals. At the conclusion of the series, it also introduced the Coach of the Year.

During the 2022 season, the league presented its first Rookie of the Year and Homegrown Player of the Year awards, while the Most Improved Player and Impact Player of the Year awards were introduced during the succeeding 2023 season.

== Individual awards ==
Award	First awarded	Description	Most recent winner	Ref.
Most Valuable Player	2019	Awarded to the best performing player of the regular season.	Justine Baltazar (Pampanga Giant Lanterns)	
All-Star Game Most Valuable Player	2019	Awarded to the best performing player of the MPBL All-Star Game.	Will McAloney (Nueva Ecija Rice Vanguards)	
Finals Most Valuable Player	2018	Awarded to the best performing player of the MPBL national finals.	Justine Baltazar (Pampanga Giant Lanterns)	
Defensive Player of the Year	2019	Awarded to the player with the best defensive performance during the regular season.	Dawn Ochea (Batangas City Tanduay Rum Masters)	
Rookie of the Year	2022	Awarded to best performing first-year player of the regular season.	Ljay Gonzales (Quezon Huskers)	
Homegrown Player of the Year	2022	Awarded to the player with the best performance of the regular season while playing for his hometown team.	JR Olegario (Parañaque Patriots)	
Most Improved Player	2023	Awarded to the player who has shown the biggest improvement from the previous season.	Laurenz Victoria (Pasay Voyagers)	
Sportsmanship award	2019	Awarded to the player who has shown sportsmanlike behavior throughout the season.	Nikko Panganiban (San Juan Knights)	
Coach of the Year	2019	Awarded to the coach of the winning team of the National Finals.	Dennis Pineda (Pampanga Giant Lanterns)	
Executive of the Year	2019	Awarded to the league's top executive; named after Lucio Tan Jr.	Oscar Malapitan (Caloocan Batang Kankaloo)	

== Defunct award ==
Award	First awarded	Last awarded	Description	Most recent winner	Ref.
Impact Player of the Year	2023		Awarded to the player who "draws large crowds" during the regular season.	Poypoy Actub (Imus SV Squad)	
