= United Regional Basketball League =

Filipino amateur basketball league

- Sport: Basketball
- Founded: 2004
- Folded: 2005
- No. of teams: 5
- Country: Philippines
- Continent: FIBA Asia (Asia)
- Last champion: M. Lhuillier Kwarta Padala-Cebu Niños

The United Regional Basketball League (URBL) was a community-based amateur basketball league in the Philippines that played only one season in 2004. The league was managed by persons identified with the old Metropolitan Basketball Association (MBA), a professional community-based league that suspended operations in the middle of 2002. Basketball legend and former MBA commissioner Ramon Fernandez reprised his role with the URBL.

== History ==
Sometime in February 2004, the Ilocos Sur Snipers of Gov. Luis “Chavit” Singson and M. Lhuillier Kwarta Padala-Cebu City of Michel Lhuillier ceded from the National Basketball League (NBL), which had just been renamed the National Basketball Conference (NBC). The two teams were not satisfied with the way the NBL/NBC was being managed and so opted to form their own league.

Three other teams later joined the fray – the Quezon Coco Huskers, Lactovitale-Cebu and Harbour Centre-Pampanga of Mikee Romero.

The opening ceremonies were held on September 25, 2004 at the New Cebu Coliseum. Forward Melchor Latoreno of the Huskers scored the first basket in league history in the opening game against Lactovitale. Lactovitale prevailed, 82-77, behind the 21 markers of Bonel Balingit.

Tournament format called for the five teams to play two round robins, with the top four advancing to the double round semifinals and their elimination round records set aside. The top two teams after the semifinals clashed in a best-of-five series for the title while the other two teams will disputed the third place in a one-game playoff.

M. Lhuillier topped the eliminations with a 7-1 record. The Snipers and Harbour Centre-Pampanga followed at 4-4. The Huskers (3-5) took the last semifinal slot by edging Lactovitale (2-6).

In the semifinals, the Snipers made their move and finished in a tie with M. Lhuillier at the top, 4-2. However, the Snipers earned the home court advantage in the championship series. The Huskers finished at 3-3, bungling a chance to force a triple-tie thanks to a loss to Harbour Centre on the final day of the semis. That was Harbour Centre's lone semifinal win.

M. Lhuillier defeated the Snipers to win the championship, 3-1. Both squads split the opening two games in Santo Domingo, Ilocos Sur. M. Lhuillier bounced back to take the next two meetings in Cebu City. Meanwhile, Huskers exacted revenge on Harbour Centre in San Fernando, Pampanga to take third place, by 88-84.

Despite a successful inaugural run, the URBL folded up after one season. The biggest blow came off the basketball court after commissioner Fernandez suddenly became scarce in order to attend to some family matters. Sans their leader, the preparations for the second season hit a major roadblock.

Still, the group helped to organize the 2005 Mayor Tomas Osmena Sinulog International Invitational Cup in Cebu City in January. M. Lhuillier won the tournament via a sweep. The Huskers, which were reinforced by stars from the other URBL teams, finished in second, ahead of guest entries from Konkuk University of South Korea, Fujian Province of China, Cotabato and the Philippine Training Team. As their final activity, the URBL tied up with the San Jose Sky Rockets of the American Basketball Association (ABA) and facilitated the team's search for possible Filipino recruits in October. That led to the Sky Rockets’ signing of guard Mark Magsumbol, a former national junior cager.

== Aftermath ==
In the aftermath of the URBL's closure, Harbour Centre accepted an offer to put up a new team in the Philippine Basketball League (PBL). M. Lhuillier coach Raul “Yayoy” Alcoseba then organized a similar community-based league exclusive for Southern Philippines, the Mindanao Visayas Basketball Association (MVBA). Soberano later signed up as one of the MVBA pioneers through his Cebu Landmaster quintet. The Quezon Coco Huskers would be resurrected in 2023 as the Quezon Huskers as an expansion team for the Maharlika Pilipinas Basketball League's (MPBL) 2023 season.

== Teams ==
- M. Lhuillier Kwarta Padala-Cebu Niños
- Ilocos Sur Snipers
- Quezon Coco Huskers
- Harbour Centre-Pampanga
- Lactovitale-Cebu

== Championship series ==
M. Lhuillier Kwarta Padala-Cebu City d. Ilocos Sur Snipers, 3-1

- Dec. 10: M. Lhuillier d. Ilocos Sur, 80-77
- Dec. 11: Ilocos Sur d. M. Lhuillier, 85-76 (OT)
- Dec. 15: M. Lhuillier d. Ilocos Sur, 74-70
- Dec. 16: M. Lhuillier d. Ilocos Sur, 95-83

== Notable players ==
Most Valuable Player

- Woodrow Enriquez, M. Lhuillier

Mythical Five

- Woodrow Enriquez, M. Lhuillier
- Bruce Dacia, M. Lhuillier
- Jerome Barbosa, Ilocos Sur
- Ariel Garcia, Harbour Centre (scoring leader, 13.9 PPG)
- Billy Bansil, Harbour Centre (rebounding leader, 8.2 RPG)

With the URBL's closure in 2005, many of its alumni managed to further their basketball careers, led by Dacia who was signed up by the Air21 Express as a rookie free agent. The other PBA call-ups were guard Nino Marquez (Air21) and center Mark Kong (Alaska) of the Huskers and the Snipers’ center Philip Butel (Sta. Lucia). Edgar Echavez of the Huskers, who played for Purefoods in 2003, also managed to return to the PBA via Barangay Ginebra in 2005.

== Coaches ==
- M. Lhuillier Kwarta Padala-Cebu Niños – Raul “Yayoy” Alcoseba
- Ilocos Sur Snipers – Mario Quitoriano
- Quezon Coco Huskers – Francis Rodriguez
- Harbour Centre-Pampanga – Alex Gonzalez (eliminations), Adriano “Bong” Go (semifinals)
- Lactovitale-Cebu – Rodesendo “Rhoel” Gomez

== Home venues ==
- Santo Domingo People's Center (Santo Domingo, Ilocos Sur)
- Archbishop Cinense Gym-University of the Assumption (San Fernando City)
- Quezon Convention Center (Lucena City)
- New Cebu Coliseum (Cebu City)
- Don Celestino Martinez Memorial Coliseum (Bogo)

== Media coverage ==
The URBL's opening ceremonies and doubleheader were covered live over ABC-5. Television coverage then took a break and returned during the championship series, on a delayed basis on NBN-4.

Aside from television, the URBL enjoyed good print coverage from both local and national newspapers, tabloids and magazines. Some of Lactovitale's home games saw time over local radio stations.
