= Ljay Gonzales =

Filipino basketball player

No. 13 – NLEX Road Warriors
- Position: Point guard
- League: PBA

Personal information
- Born: December 19, 1998 (age 27) San Mateo, Isabela, Philippines
- Listed height: 5 ft 11 in (1.80 m)

Career information
- High school: FEU Diliman (Quezon City)
- College: FEU
- PBA draft: 2025: 1st round, 5th overall pick
- Drafted by: NLEX Road Warriors
- Playing career: 2023–present

Career history
- 2023–2025: Quezon Huskers/Titans
- 2025–present: NLEX Road Warriors

Career highlights
- All-MPBL First Team (2025); All-MPBL Second Team (2024); MPBL Rookie of the Year (2024); 2× MPBL All-Star (2024, 2025); PSL champion (2024)

Louell Jay "Ljay" Gonzales (born December 19, 1998) is a Filipino professional basketball player for the NLEX Road Warriors of the Philippine Basketball Association (PBA).

Gonzales played his high school and collegiate career with the FEU Tamaraws, where he would stay until 2023. The following year, Gonzales made his professional debut with the Quezon Huskers franchise that played in both the Maharlika Pilipinas Basketball League (MPBL) and Pilipinas Super League (PSL), leading the Huskers to three finals appearances across both leagues, including a championship in the PSL. Gonzales also won the MPBL Rookie of the Year award, made two all-star appearances, and earned an All-MPBL Second Team selection.

In September 2025, Gonzales was selected fifth overall by the NLEX Road Warriors in the PBA season 50 draft.

== High school and college career ==
Gonzales played for the Far Eastern University (FEU) Tamaraws in high school and college. In 2017, in the juniors' (high school) division, he led Far Eastern University Diliman (FEU–D) to the UAAP Season 79 juniors' basketball title, earning finals MVP honors. The following year, in Season 80, Gonzales was selected to the Mythical Five.

Gonzales remained with FEU for the seniors' (college) division, playing for the Tamaraws for the entirety of his college career.

== Professional career ==
=== 2024–2025: Quezon Huskers franchise ===
Following his college career, Gonzales signed with the Quezon Huskers on November 23, 2023, reuniting him with former FEU assistant coach Eric Gonzales. During the 2024 MPBL season, Ljay averaged 9.8 points, 5.1 rebounds, and 3.8 assists per game while leading Quezon to the best record in the South Division and later on their first MPBL finals appearance. For his efforts, Ljay became an all-star starter, won the MPBL Rookie of the Year award, and was selected to the All-MPBL Second Team.

On August 15, 2025, Gonzales declared for the PBA season 50 draft as one of the earliest applicants in the draft class. He would go on to be selected fifth overall by the NLEX Road Warriors.

=== 2025–present: NLEX Road Warriors ===
On December 23, 2025, Gonzales signed a rookie contract with NLEX.

== Career statistics ==
=== MPBL ===
Legend
GP	Games played	GS	Games started	MPG	Minutes per game
FG%	Field-goal percentage	3P%	3-point field-goal percentage	FT%	Free-throw percentage
RPG	Rebounds per game	APG	Assists per game	SPG	Steals per game
BPG	Blocks per game	PPG	Points per game	**Bold**	Career high

==== Season-by-season averages ====
Year	Team	GP	GS	MPG	FG%	3P%	FT%	RPG	APG	SPG	BPG	PPG
2024	Quezon	35	25	20.3	.381	.221	**.681**	5.1	3.8	1.3	.3	9.8
2025	Quezon	**37**	**34**	**21.4**	**.462**	**.297**	.674	**6.0**	**4.7**	**1.6**	**.4**	**11.3**
