= 2017 FEU Tamaraws basketball team =

American college basketball season

2017 FEU Tamaraws men's basketball
- Conference: UAAP
- Record: 8-8 (7-7 Elimination Round)
- Head coach: Olsen Racela (1st season)
- Assistant coach: Eric Gonzales, Ryan Betia, Gilbert Lao, and Johnny Abarrientos
- Captain: Ron Dennison

The 2017 FEU Tamaraws Men's Basketball Team represented Far Eastern University during the University Athletic Association of the Philippines' 80th season in men's basketball division. The Tamaraws were led by their rookie head coach Olsen Racela who replaced his brother Nash, who took over professional team TNT KaTropa in the Philippine Basketball Association.

The Tamaraws were looking to reclaim the crown this season as they had an experienced lineup led by ex-Ateneo Blue Eagles Hubert Cani, Arvin Tolentino and Filipino-American Jasper Parker.

Name	Number	Pos.	Height	Weight	Year	Hometown	Notes
Monbert Arong	12	SG	6'0"	-	Senior	Cebu City, Cebu	Graduated and playing for Cignal Hawkeyes in the PBA D-League
Raymar Jose	6	PF	6'4"	-	Senior	Cebu City, Cebu	Graduated and playing for Cignal Hawkeyes in the PBA D-League
Ken Holmqvist	18	C	6'8"	-	Junior	Oslo, Norway	Opted not to return
Steve Holmqvist	11	SF	6'4"	-	Junior	Oslo, Norway	Opted not to return

== Current roster ==
FEU Tamaraws roster
Players
Coaches

Pos.	No.	Nat.	Name	Height	Year	High School
SF	0	(Philippines)	Escoto, Richard D.	6'4" (1.93m)	4th	FEU Diliman
SG	1	(Philippines)	Nunag, Joseph Gerald L.	6'0" (1.83m)	2nd	Rangitoto HS
F	2	(United States)	Stockton, Alec	6'3" (1.91m)	1st	Pacific High School
G	3	(United States)	Parker, Jasper	5'10" (1.78m)	1st	Sunny Hills High School
PG	4	(United States)	Trinidad, Jose Allen C.	5'11" (1.8m)	3rd	Orange Coast
PG	5	(Philippines)	Iñigo, Alejandrino	5'9" (1.75m)	4th-transfer	San Beda
SG	7	(Philippines)	Dennison, Ron Marvis C. (C)	5'11" (1.8m)	5th	UV
PF	8	(Philippines)	Ebona, Kevin Barkley C.	6'5" (1.96m)	3rd	Cebu-IT
SF	9	(Philippines)	Bayquin, Kim Lee	6'3" (1.91m)	3rd-transfer	Chiang Kai Shek
PG	10	(Philippines)	Comboy III, Wendelino T.	6'0" (1.83m)	3rd	FEU Diliman
F	13	(Philippines)	Tolentino, Arvin	6'4" (1.93m)	3rd-Transfer	San Beda
PF	15	(Philippines)	Bienes, Brandrey G.	6'5" (1.96m)	2nd	FEU Diliman
C	17	(Nigeria)	Orizu, Prince I.	6'9" (2.06m)	2nd	Ikeja High School
PG	18	(Philippines)	Cani, Hubert	5'11" (1.8m)	2nd-transfer	NU
PF	20	(New Zealand)	Tuffin, Kenneth James D.	6'4" (1.93m)	2nd	St Patrick's College
G	21	(Canada)	Ramirez, RJ	6'0" (1.83m)	1st	Humber

Head coach

- (Philippines) Olsen Racela

Assistant coach(es)

- (Philippines) Josh Reyes
- (Philippines) Johnny Abarrientos
- (Philippines) Jojo Lastimosa
- (Philippines) Eric Gonzales
- (Philippines) Gilbert Lao

Team manager

- (Philippines) Mark Molina
- (Philippines) Anton Montinola

Legend

- (C) Team captain
- Injured

- Roster
- Transactions
Updated: 2017–05–08

Team Depth Chart

Pos.	Starting 5	Bench 1	Bench 2	Bench 3
C	Prince Orizu	Kevin Ebona
PF	Ken Tuffin	Richard Escoto	Brandrey Bienes
SF	Ron Dennison	Arvin Tolentino	Kim Lee Bayquin
SG	Jojo Trinidad	Wendell Comboy	RJ Ramirez	Alec Stockton
PG	Axel Inigo	Jasper Parker	Hubert Cani	Joseph Nunag

== Schedule ==
Date time, TV	Rank^{#}	Opponent^{#}	Result	Record	High points	High rebounds	High assists	Site (attendance) city, state
UAAP Season 80 First Round
September 10*; 4:00 pm		La Salle	L 90–95	0-1	21 – Dennison	10 – Orizu	4 – Dennison	Mall of Asia Arena; Pasay, Philippines
September 13*; 2:00 pm		East	W 90–83	1-1	16 – Dennison	16 – Orizu	6 – Iñigo	Smart Araneta Coliseum; Quezon City, Philippines
September 14*; 4:00 pm		Ateneo	L 82–94	1-2	12 – Comboy	5 – Tied	5 – Parker	Smart Araneta Coliseum; Quezon City, Philippines
September 23*; 2:00 pm		UST	W 78-65	2-2	15 – Tied	10 – Tolentino	5 – Parker	Mall of Asia Arena; Pasay, Philippines
September 27*; 2:00 pm		NU	W 90-83	3-2	23 – Tolentino	8 – Tied	4 – Comboy	Smart Araneta Coliseum; Quezon City, Philippines
October 1*; 2:00 pm		UP	W 78-59	4-2	16 – Dennison	14 – Orizu	4 – Parker	Smart Araneta Coliseum; Quezon City, Philippines
October 7*; 4:00 pm		Adamson						Mall of Asia Arena; Pasay, Philippines
*Non-conference game. ^{#}Rankings from AP Poll. (#) Tournament seedings in parentheses. All times are in Philippine Time.

== Player stats ==
Legend
GP	Games played	GS	Games started	MPG	Minutes per game
FG%	Field-goal percentage	3P%	3-point field-goal percentage	FT%	Free-throw percentage
RPG	Rebounds per game	APG	Assists per game	SPG	Steals per game
BPG	Blocks per game	PPG	Points per game

Player	GP	MPG	PPG	DRPG	ORPG	RPG	APG	SPG	BPG	TPG
Ron Dennison	2	22.67	18.50	4.00	1.50	5.50	3.50	1.50	0.50	2.00
Prince Orizu	2	27.00	13.50	9.00	4.00	13.00	1.00	0.50	1.00	1.00
Arvin Tolentino	2	10.00	9.00	4.50	1.00	5.50	0.50	0.00	0.50	2.50
Richard Escoto	2	14.50	8.00	1.00	0.50	1.50	1.00	0.50	0.00	1.50
Wendell Comboy	2	21.00	7.50	0.50	1.00	1.50	2.50	0.50	0.00	1.50
RJ Ramirez	1	14.00	7.00	2.00	2.00	4.00	1.00	0.00	0.00	2.00
Axel Iñigo	2	23.00	6.50	1.00	0.50	1.50	4.50	0.00	0.00	2.00
Ken Tuffin	2	23.00	6.00	3.00	2.00	5.00	2.00	0.00	0.00	1.50
Barkley Eboña	2	6.50	5.50	1.50	1.50	3.00	0.00	0.00	0.00	1.00
Jasper Parker	2	13.00	5.50	2.50	0.00	2.50	3.50	0.00	0.00	2.00
Hubert Cani	2	13.00	3.50	1.00	0.00	1.00	1.00	0.50	0.00	2.50
Joe Allen Trinidad	2	13.50	3.00	1.00	0.00	1.00	2.00	0.50	0.00	2.50
Brandrey Bienes	2	3.00	0.00	0.00	0.00	0.00	0.50	0.00	0.00	0.00
Joseph Nunag	1	5.00	0.00	1.00	0.00	1.00	0.00	0.00	0.50	1.00
Kim Lee Bayquin	0	0	0.00	0.00	0.00	0.00	0.00	0.00	0.00	0.00
Alec Stockton	0	0	0.00	0.00	0.00	0.00	0.00	0.00	0.00	0.00

Statistics by PBA-Online.net
