= Jaycee Marcelino =

Filipino basketball player (born 1995)

Personal information
- Born: October 19, 1995 (age 31) Olongapo City, Philippines
- Listed height: 5 ft 9 in (1.75 m)

Career information
- College: Lyceum
- PBA draft: 2019: 2nd round, 17th overall pick
- Drafted by: Alaska Aces
- Playing career: 2020–present
- Position: Point guard

Career history
- 2020–2022: Alaska Aces
- 2022–2024: Zamboanga Family's Brand / Master Sardines
- 2025: Nueva Ecija Rice Vanguards

Career highlights
- MPBL Most Valuable Player (2022); 3× All-MPBL First Team (2022–2024); All-MPBL Second Team (2025); 4× MPBL All-Star (2022–2025); MPBL All-Star Game MVP (2022); NCAA Philippines Rookie of the Year (2017); NCAA Philippines Mythical Five (2019); PCCL Champion (2017); PCCL MVP (2017); PCCL Finals MVP (2017); PCCL Mythical Five (2017)

Jaycee Carlos Marcelino (born October 19, 1995) is a Filipino basketball player who last played for the Nueva Ecija Rice Vanguards of the Maharlika Pilipinas Basketball League (MPBL). He was drafted 17th overall pick in the 2nd round of the 2019 PBA draft.

== Early life ==
Jaycee was born in Olongapo City along with his twin brother, Jayvee. Their father died when they were four years old, so they were raised by their mother and their grandfather. Their mother worked as a domestic helper in Dubai. They couldn't always afford to eat three times a day, so they worked at a young age as vegetable sellers and as karagadors (porters). They learned basketball by playing against their friends in their barangay, as they lived near the barangay court, and also from their relatives.

== College career ==
When they got older, their basketball skills were discovered at an exhibition game in Orani, Bataan. Encouraged by the mayor of Orani, who knew personally the coach of the Adamson Falcons (which was Kenneth Duremdes at the time), the twins decided to move to Manila. In 2015, they joined the Falcons' Team B. However, when a new head coach took over the program, they decided to leave.

=== Lyceum Pirates ===
The twins made a phone call to Topex Robinson, who was the head coach of the Lyceum Pirates, and was also from Olongapo. He offered them spots on the team and they soon joined. Although Jaycee officially didn't play in 2016, he did get to join the NCAA's Slam Dunk contest.

==== Season 93 ====
In 2017, the twins joined a Lyceum recruiting class that also included transferee CJ Perez. In a win over the Arellano Chiefs, Jaycee had 13 points, six rebounds, two assists, and two steals while also limiting Arellano's main scorer Kent Salado to just 11 points on 5-of-15 shooting with four turnovers. He then had 17 points on 7-for-9 shooting to go along with seven rebounds and three assists in a win over the Benilde Blazers. Against the EAC Generals, he made a clutch steal and breakaway steal as he and Perez led the team to the win with 20 points each. In a win over the Mapúa Cardinals, he scored 19 points. On the twins' 20th birthday, they won over the San Beda Red Lions, ensuring an 18–0 sweep of the elimination rounds and an automatic Finals appearance. Jaycee was awarded as the league's Rookie of the Year, with averages of 10.7 points, 5.4 rebounds, 2.4 assists, and 1.4 steals. However, Lyceum did not win the title, as they lost to San Beda in the Finals.

==== Season 94 ====
In the preseason, Lyceum won the Philippine Collegiate Champions League (PCCL) title, with Jaycee winning Finals MVP. He was also awarded as the overall MVP and was named to the tournament's Mythical Team. In a Season 94 win over EAC, he scored 13 of his 24 points in the fourth quarter and also provided eight rebounds, five steals, and two assists as EAC nearly got the win after overcoming a 31-point deficit. For that performance, he won a Player of the Week award. In a win over Mapúa, he had 13 points, two rebounds, two assists, and two steals. He then had 20 points on 8-of 11 shooting in a win over the Perpetual Altas. Lyceum ended the first round of eliminations with no losses. That season, he and Jayvee got to play in that year's All-Star Game, where they teamed up to do a viral highlight in which Jayvee (also listed as 5′9") lifted him up for the dunk. Although he scored 15 points, their team lost the game.

In a win over the San Sebastian Stags, Jaycee contributed 17 points, six rebounds, three assists, and two steals as Lyceum won its 10th straight game of the season. In a rematch with EAC, he had 15 points, seven assists, and four steals as they made the Generals commit 38 turnovers for the Pirates' 12th straight win. The winning streak was snapped the following game as Lyceum lost in the elimination rounds for the first time since 2016 due to a buzzer-beating putback from Perpetual's Prince Eze. He bounced back the following game against Arellano with 21 points on 8-for-11 shooting with three rebounds, three assists, and four steals without his brother's help as Jayvee had been injured in the previous game. In his brother's return against the Letran Knights, he made a clutch three-pointer that could have tied the game with 40 seconds left in the game, however, it was ruled to be a two-pointer and Letran got a one-point win. They ended the elimination rounds with one more loss, this time to San Beda, as they finished 15–3 and with the no. 2 seed. Lyceum got back into the Finals against San Beda where in Game 1, he had 13 points, five rebounds, three assists, and a steal but Lyceum lost. They lost Game 2 and San Beda won another title.

==== Season 95 ====
Season 95 saw CJ Perez and team captain MJ Ayaay leave Lyceum to turn pro, giving more responsibility to Marcelino. In Lyceum's first game of the season against the Knights, he scored 24 points, six rebounds, five assists, and three steals while his brother supported him with 18 points, six rebounds, two assists, and the game-sealing layup with four seconds remaining. They lost by two points in their next game, which was against the Generals, despite him leading with 23 points, six rebounds, and four assists. He got the Pirates back into the winning column with a win over the Cardinals with 14 points, seven rebounds, two assists, two steals, and two blocks. In a win over the Blazers, he led with 23 points and five rebounds. They then lost once again to the Red Lions, in which he shot just 4-of-11 from the field and committed seven turnovers.

In a win over the Altas, Marcelino led with 21 points and five rebounds as they got into second place in the standings. In a rematch against the Blazers, he scored 15 of his 22 points in the second half to lead the Pirates to their ninth win of the season. Despite suffering from a flu before their game against the Knights, he put up a career-high 25 points to lead them to a win. For that performance, he earned a Player of the Week award. In a rematch against the Generals, he scored 13 of his 23 points in the fourth to prevent another loss to the Generals. He only missed one of his 11 attempts in that game. They then lost to the Stags despite his 21 points, six rebounds, and three assists. The Pirates officially claimed the second seed with a win over the JRU Heavy Bombers in which he had 23 points and five rebounds. They then closed out the elimination rounds with a loss to the Red Lions in which he had 17 points and four rebounds.

In the Final Four, despite Marcelino's career-high 26 points, the Pirates were upset by the Knights. He did get into the Mythical Team that season with averages of 18.6 points on 53% shooting, along with 5.1 rebounds, 2.8 assists, and 1.4 steals. Both he and his brother got to play in the All-Star Game as well. Despite both of them having one more year of eligibility, they decided to turn pro and declared for the PBA Draft.

== Professional career ==
=== Alaska Aces (2020–2022) ===
Marcelino was drafted by the Alaska Aces in the 2nd round (with the 5th pick) of the 2019 PBA draft. He was signed to a two-year deal. In his rookie season, he had little playing time as he only averaged 4.3 minutes and around two points per game.

In the 2021 Philippine Cup, Marcelino scored eight points in a win over Barangay Ginebra. He then scored nine points in a win over the TNT Tropang Giga.

=== Zamboanga Family's Brand / Master Sardines (2022–2024) ===
==== 2022 season ====
In 2022, he and his twin brother, Jayvee debuted in the Maharlika Pilipinas Basketball League with the Zamboanga Family's Brand Sardines. They started the season 5–0 with a win over the Pasig Sta. Lucia Realtors in which he had 20 points, six rebounds, six assists, and five steals. In a win over the Sarangani Marlins, he had a near triple-double with nine points, nine rebounds, and seven assists to go along with his three steals. He then scored 21 of his 26 points in the fourth quarter and overtime to lead his team to a come-from-behind win over Valenzuela XUR Homes Realty Inc. He got the MVP award in that year's MPBL All-Star Game, scoring 19 points, seven assists, and three rebounds as he led the South All-Stars to the win. For leading Zamboanga to an 18–3 record, Marcelino won the league MVP award and was also named to the Mythical Team.

In Game 1 of their first round series against the Muntinlupa Cagers, the Marcelino twins combined for 20 points, 10 rebounds, and 15 assists. Jaycee then delivered a triple-double in Game 2 with 24 points, 11 rebounds, 11 assists, plus six steals as they moved on to the division semis. In Game 1 of their semis against the Bacolod Bingo Plus, he led with a double-double of 21 points and 13 rebounds. They closed out the series in Game 2 in which he had 21 points, six rebounds, six assists, three steals, and one block. In the division finals, despite his 22 points and six rebounds, the Batangas City Embassy Chill won the first game. Zamboanga then won the next game and in Game 3, he put up 14 points, 7 rebounds, 6 assists, and 5 steals to give Zamboanga the South Division title.

In Game 1 of the National Finals, he was limited to just 12 points as the Nueva Ecija Rice Vanguards got the win. In Game 2, despite his 26 points, seven rebounds, four assists, and two steals, Zamboanga lost by one point. His brother Jayvee then stepped up in Game 3 with 22 points, seven rebounds and three assists, although he was able to make an impact with nine points, 10 rebounds, nine assists, and four steals, as they extended the series. Nueva Ecija then beat them in Game 4 to claim the national championship.

==== 2023 season ====
In the preseason, Zamboanga won the 2023 MPBL Preseason Invitational. In a win over Valenzuela, Marcelino scored 22 points, six assists, four steals and four rebounds. He then recorded 17 points, eight assists, five rebounds, three steals and one block in a win over the Pasay Voyagers. Against the Marikina Shoemasters, he scored 22 points (with the last five of those points tying the game in the clutch), six rebounds, and three steals, but they lost due to a buzzer-beater from Marikina. In a win over the Rizal Golden Coolers, he scored a career-high 27 points to go along with his five rebounds and four assists as they raised their record to 12–3. That season, he was an All-Star once again, contributing 16 points and eight rebounds as his team lost. In an overtime win over Pasig, he led with 21 points, four rebounds, two steals and two assists.

Once again, Zamboanga got into the playoffs. In Game 1 of their first round series against the Quezon Huskers, Marcelino almost put up a triple-double with 20 points, 10 rebounds, and seven assists to lead them to the win. They closed out that series in Game 3. In Game 1 of the division semifinals, he led with 18 points, eight rebounds, four assists and two steals, but also recorded six turnovers as they lost to the Bacoor City Strikers. They lost the next game, and were eliminated from contending for the South Division title. Once again, he was named to the Mythical Team.

==== 2024 Season ====
In the opening game win against the Valenzuela Classic, Marcelino tallied 26 points, eight rebounds, a steal, and 12 out of 21 from the field. In the same game, Marcelino achieved his 1,000th career points in his MPBL career in just 3 seasons, the 29th player to do so. In the next game, he recorded his new career-high with 31 points, along with four rebounds, three assists, and eight steals in a win over Bicolandia Oragons. Marcelino scored 20 points, seven rebounds, six assists, and four steals in an 18-point comeback win over South Cotabato Warriors. The next game, he scored 24 points, nine rebounds, three assists, and a block in an Overtime loss over the Quezon Huskers.

== Career statistics ==
=== PBA ===
Legend
GP	Games played	MPG	Minutes per game
FG%	Field-goal percentage	3P%	3-point field-goal percentage	FT%	Free-throw percentage
RPG	Rebounds per game	APG	Assists per game	SPG	Steals per game
BPG	Blocks per game	PPG	Points per game	**Bold**	Career high

As of the end of 2021 season

==== Season-by-season averages ====
Year	Team	GP	MPG	FG%	3P%	FT%	RPG	APG	SPG	BPG	PPG
2020	Alaska	5	4.3	**.571**	—	**1.000**	.4	.4	.2	.0	1.8
2021	Alaska	**10**	**8.2**	.467	.000	**1.000**	**1.2**	**.8**	**.5**	**.1**	**3.0**
Career		15	6.9	.486	.000	1.000	.9	.7	.4	.1	2.6

=== MPBL ===
Legend
GP	Games played	GS	Games started	MPG	Minutes per game
FG%	Field-goal percentage	3P%	3-point field-goal percentage	FT%	Free-throw percentage
RPG	Rebounds per game	APG	Assists per game	SPG	Steals per game
BPG	Blocks per game	PPG	Points per game	**Bold**	Career high

As of the end of 2023 season

==== Season-by-season averages ====
Year	Team	GP	GS	MPG	FG%	3P%	FT%	RPG	APG	SPG	BPG	PPG
2022	Zamboanga	30	15	26.4	**.507**	.225	**.708**	**6.3**	4.7	**2.7**	**.8**	**18.4**
2023	Zamboanga	**32**	**18**	**27.3**	.474	**.291**	.707	5.5	**5.5**	1.9	.5	15.1
