= 2017 PCCL National Collegiate Championship =

Men's Finals	G1	Wins
Lyceum Pirates	70	1
San Beda Red Lions	66	0
- Duration: February 8–15, 2018
- Arena(s): Filoil Flying V Arena
- Finals MVP: Jaycee Marcelino(LPU)
- Winning coach: Topex Robinson
- TV network(s): Basketball TV

The 2017 PCCL National Collegiate Championship is the ninth edition of the Philippine Collegiate Champions League (PCCL) in its current incarnation, the postseason tournament to determine the national collegiate champions in basketball. The tournament will be the ninth edition in its current incarnation, and the 14th edition overall.

== Format ==
Eight teams will compete in the national championship to be held in Metro Manila in February 2018. The finalists of the recently concluded NCAA and UAAP basketball championships, as well as the champion of the CESAFI basketball championship will automatically qualify in the tournament. Qualifying tournaments for the three remaining slots were held for Mindanao, Luzon and Metro Manila.

== Qualifying teams ==
=== Automatic qualifiers ===
Team	League	Elim. round finish	Playoff finish	Qualified as
Ateneo Blue Eagles	UAAP	1st (13–1)	Def. La Salle in finals	UAAP champion
De La Salle Green Archers	UAAP	2nd (12–2)	Def. by Ateneo in finals	UAAP runner-up
San Beda Red Lions	NCAA	2nd (16–2)	Def. Lyceum in finals	NCAA champion
Lyceum Pirates	NCAA	1st (18–0)	Def. by San Beda in finals	NCAA runner-up
University of the Visayas Green Lancers	CESAFI	1st (16–2)	Def. University of Cebu in finals	CESAFI champion

=== Regional qualifiers ===
Team	Qualified as	Regional tournament
Naga College Foundation Tigers	Luzon champion	North Luzon/South Luzon knockout game Def. Lyceum-Northwestern University (North Luzon champion)
Holy Trinity College Wildcats	Mindanao champion	Mindanao qualifiers Def. HCC Crusaders in finals
San Sebastian Stags	NCR qualifiers champion	NCR qualifiers Def. CDSL Griffins in finals

== Regional qualifiers results ==
=== South Luzon ===
November 18

Box score

NCF Tigers	vs.	UPHSL Saints
Scoring by quarter: 24–18, 25–20, 21–15, 28–21

UNC Sports Palace, Naga, Camarines Sur

=== North Luzon ===
November 29

LNU Dukes	vs.	MQC Legionnaires

Salvador Duque Fieldhouse (LNU Gymnasium), Dagupan

=== North Luzon/South Luzon knockout ===
November 30

Box score

LNU Dukes	vs.	NCF Tigers
Scoring by quarter: 15–21, 19–16, 29–30, 12–12

Salvador Duque Fieldhouse (LNU Gymnasium), Dagupan

=== Mindanao ===
November 25

Box score

HCC Crusaders	vs. (OT)	HTC Wildcats
Scoring by quarter: 32–21, 14–18, 17–20, 16–20, Overtime: 12–13

Almendras Gym, Davao

=== NCR ===
The NCR Regional Qualifiers were held at the Jose Rizal University (JRU) gymnasium from January 15 to 18.

==== Group A ====
Pos	Team	Pld	W	L	PCT	GB	Qualification	CDSL	SCC	JRU
1	CDSL Griffins	2	2	0	1.000	—	Qualified to the NCR Qualifiers finals		87–80	83–58
2	St. Clare Saints	2	1	1	.500	1				
3	JRU Heavy Bombers	2	0	2	.000	2			85–88	

==== Group B ====
Pos	Team	Pld	W	L	PCT	GB	Qualification	SSC-R	UP	PATTS
1	San Sebastian Stags	2	2	0	1.000	—	Qualified to the NCR Qualifiers finals			
2	UP Fighting Maroons	2	1	1	.500	1		84–93		84–79
3	PATTS Seahorses	2	0	2	.000	2		67–90		

==== Finals ====
January 18

boxscore

CDSL Griffins	vs.	San Sebastian Stags
Scoring by quarter: 17-21, 19-20, 28-19, 21-30

JRU Gymnasium, Mandaluyong

== Elite Eight ==
=== Group A ===
Pos	Team	Pld	W	L	PCT	GB	Qualification	LPU	ADMU	UV	NCF
1	Lyceum Pirates	3	3	0	1.000	—	Qualified to the crossover semifinals		—	88–80	94–82
2	Ateneo Blue Eagles	3	2	1	.667	1	Qualified to the crossover semifinals	65–69		91–81	84–69
3	UV Green Lancers	3	1	2	.333	2		—	—		85–82
4	NCF Tigers	3	0	3	.000	3		—	—	—	

=== Group B ===
Pos	Team	Pld	W	L	PCT	GB	Qualification	SBU	SSC-R	HTC	DLSU
1	San Beda Red Lions	3	3	0	1.000	—	Qualified to the crossover semifinals		70–67	85–46	79–35
2	San Sebastian Stags	3	2	1	.667	1	Qualified to the crossover semifinals	—		93–75	—
3	Holy Trinity Wildcats	3	1	2	.333	2		—	—		—
4	De La Salle Green Archers	3	0	3	.000	3		—	65–96	69–75	

== Final Four ==
=== Semifinals ===
February 12

boxscore

Lyceum Pirates	82–69	San Sebastian Stags
Scoring by quarter: 19–20, 16–10, 26–17, 21–22

Filoil Flying V Centre, San Juan

February 12

boxscore

San Beda Red Lions	57–52	Ateneo Blue Eagles
Scoring by quarter: 12–9, 15–11, 10–17, 20–15

Filoil Flying V Centre, San Juan

=== Finals ===
February 15
5:30pm

boxscore

Lyceum Pirates	70–66	San Beda Red Lions
Scoring by quarter: 13–21, 26–14, 15–22, 16–9

Filoil Flying V Centre, San Juan

== Awards ==
The awardees are:

- Most Valuable Player: Jaycee Marcelino (Lyceum)
- Mythical Five:
  - Jaycee Marcelino (Lyceum)
  - Javee Mocon (San Beda)
  - Pierre Donald Tankoua (San Beda)
  - CJ Perez (Lyceum)
  - Mike Nzeusseu (Lyceum)
