= Marion Magat =

Filipino basketball player

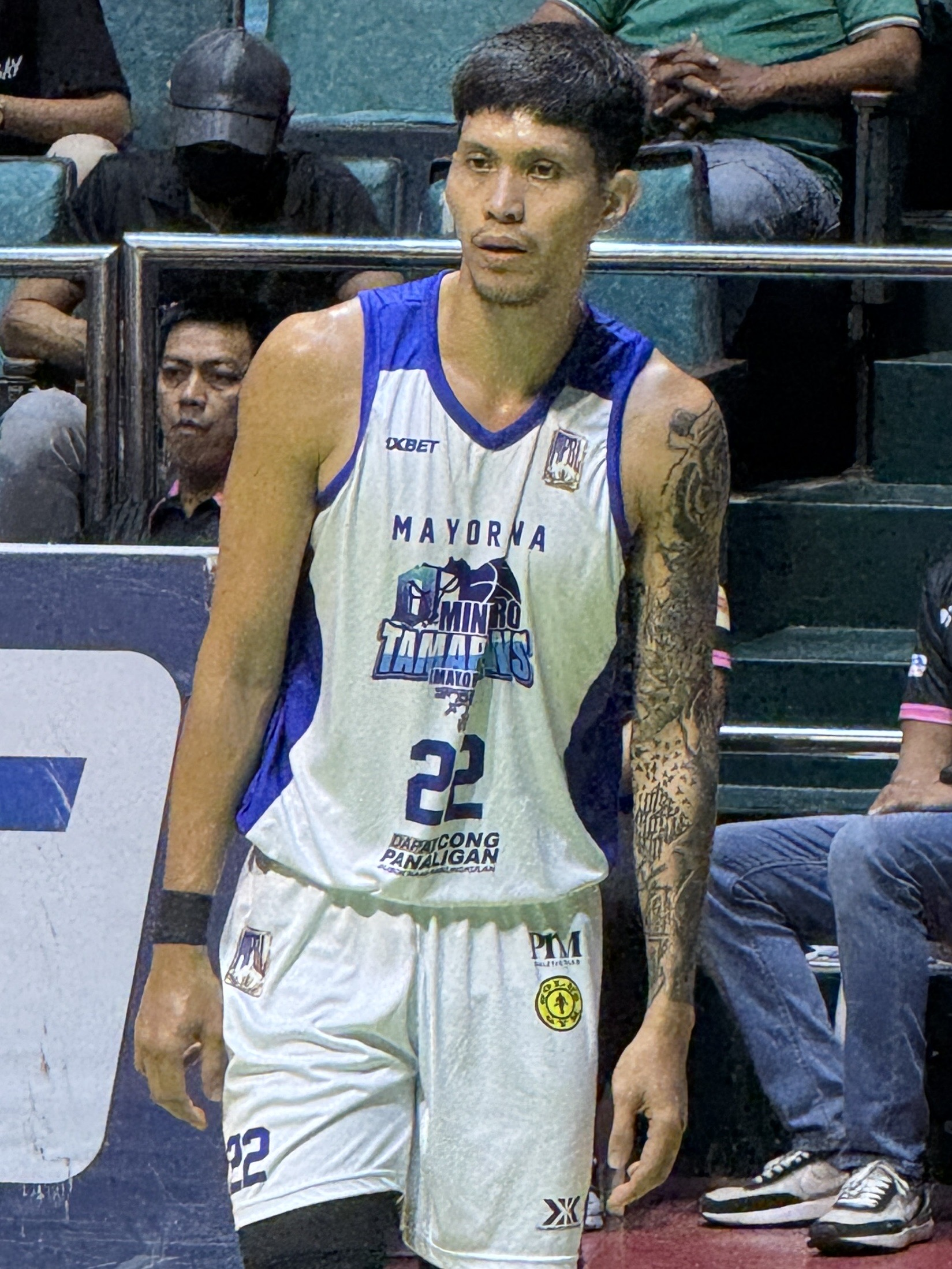
- Magat with the Mindoro Tamaraws in 2025

No. 22 – Mindoro Tamaraws
- Position: Power forward / center
- League: MPBL

Personal information
- Born: October 22, 1989 (age 37) Dagupan, Philippines
- Listed height: 6 ft 7 in (2.01 m)
- Listed weight: 180 lb (82 kg)

Career information
- College: NU
- PBA draft: 2015: 2nd round, 18th overall pick
- Drafted by: Alaska Aces
- Playing career: 2015–present

Career history
- 2015–2018: Alaska Aces
- 2019: NLEX Road Warriors
- 2019: TNT KaTropa
- 2020–2021: Blackwater Elite/Bossing
- 2021–2022: NLEX Road Warriors
- 2024: Abra Weavers
- 2025–present: Mindoro Tamaraws

Marion Evan Castillo Magat (born October 22, 1989) is a Filipino professional basketball player for the Mindoro Tamaraws of the Maharlika Pilipinas Basketball League (MPBL). He played college basketball for the NU Bulldogs of the University Athletic Association of the Philippines (UAAP).

== Professional career ==
Magat was drafted 16th overall by the Alaska Aces during the 2015 PBA draft.

During the 2019 offseason, he signed with the NLEX Road Warriors.

On June 10, 2019, he was traded to the TNT KaTropa in a three-team trade involving TNT, NLEX, and NorthPort Batang Pier.

On February 28, 2020, he was traded to the Blackwater Elite in a three-team trade involving TNT, NLEX, and Blackwater. On May 14, 2021, he signed a one-year extension with the Blackwater Bossing (formerly Elite).

On November 16, he was traded back to NLEX for Mike Ayonayon and Will McAloney.

On January 18, 2023, Magat was assigned to the Cavitex Braves, NLEX's affiliate 3x3 team.

== PBA career statistics ==
Legend
GP	Games played	MPG	Minutes per game
FG%	Field-goal percentage	3P%	3-point field-goal percentage	FT%	Free-throw percentage
RPG	Rebounds per game	APG	Assists per game	SPG	Steals per game
BPG	Blocks per game	PPG	Points per game	**Bold**	Career high

As of the end of 2022–23 season

=== Season-by-season averages ===
Year	Team	GP	MPG	FG%	3P%	FT%	RPG	APG	SPG	BPG	PPG
2015–16	Alaska	13	4.4	.190	**.333**	.286	.9	.1	.1	.4	.8
2016–17	Alaska	18	7.7	.275	.000	**.643**	1.8	.1	.1	.2	1.7
2017–18	Alaska	19	10.1	.444	.208	.444	2.5	.3	.2	.3	3.6
2019	NLEX	**32**	9.7	.460	.241	.529	3.0	.3	.1	.5	3.3
2019	TNT	**32**	9.7	.460	.241	.529	3.0	.3	.1	.5	3.3
2020	Blackwater	10	**18.3**	.447	.000	.412	4.0	.2	**.4**	**.7**	4.1
2021	Blackwater	17	14.1	**.582**	.143	.462	**4.2**	.5	.2	.6	**4.5**
2021	NLEX	17	14.1	**.582**	.143	.462	**4.2**	.5	.2	.6	**4.5**
2022–23	NLEX	9	9.4	.316	.000	.500	1.6	**.8**	.0	.1	1.6
Career		118	10.2	.437	.192	.483	2.7	.3	.1	.4	2.9
