= Mike Ayonayon =

Filipino basketball player (born 1992)

No. 8 – Abra Solid North Weavers
- Position: Shooting guard / point guard
- League: MPBL

Personal information
- Born: December 8, 1992 (age 33) Antipolo, Rizal, Philippines
- Listed height: 6 ft 0 in (1.83 m)
- Listed weight: 170 lb (77 kg)

Career information
- College: PCU
- PBA draft: 2019: 1st round, 3rd overall pick
- Drafted by: NLEX Road Warriors
- Playing career: 2019–present

Career history
- 2019–2020: San Juan Knights
- 2020–2021: NLEX Road Warriors
- 2021: San Juan Knights
- 2021–2025: Blackwater Bossing
- 2025–present: Abra Solid North Weavers

Career highlights
- 2× MPBL champion (2019, 2025); MPBL Finals MVP (2019); All-MPBL First Team (2020); MPBL All-Star (2019)

Rian Michael S. Ayonayon (born December 8, 1992) is a Filipino professional basketball player for the Abra Solid North Weavers of the Maharlika Pilipinas Basketball League (MPBL). He was drafted 3rd overall pick in the 1st round of the 2019 PBA draft.

== Professional career ==
=== NLEX Road Warriors (2020–2021) ===
Ayonayon was drafted third during the first round of the 2019 PBA draft.

=== Blackwater Bossing (2021–2025) ===
On November 16, 2021, he was traded to the Blackwater Bossing along with Will McAloney in exchange for Marion Magat.

=== Abra Solid North Weavers (2025–present) ===
On June 21, 2025, Ayonayon signed with the Abra Solid North Weavers.

== PBA career statistics ==
Legend
| GP | Games played | MPG | Minutes per game | FG% | Field-goal percentage |
| 3FG% | 3-point field-goal percentage | 4P% | 4-point field-goal percentage | FT% | Free-throw percentage |
| RPG | Rebounds per game | APG | Assists per game | SPG | Steals per game |
| BPG | Blocks per game | PPG | Points per game | 127 | Career high |

As of the end of 2023–24 season

=== Season-by-season averages ===
| Year | Team | GP | MPG | FG% | 3P% | 4P% | FT% | RPG | APG | SPG | BPG | PPG |
|---|---|---|---|---|---|---|---|---|---|---|---|---|
| 2020 | NLEX | 11 | 18.6 | .296 | .214 | — | .647 | 2.5 | 2.4 | .4 | .1 | 5.4 |
| 2021 | NLEX | 11 | 7.7 | .286 | .125 | — | .778 | 1.1 | .8 | .1 | .1 | 2.2 |
| 2021 | Blackwater | 11 | 7.7 | .286 | .125 | — | .778 | 1.1 | .8 | .1 | .1 | 2.2 |
| 2022–23 | Blackwater | 26 | 11.1 | .435 | .345 | — | .652 | 1.1 | 1.2 | .6 | — | 5.2 |
| 2023–24 | Blackwater | 8 | 17.8 | .500 | .367 | — | .583 | 1.9 | 1.6 | .3 | .1 | 9.0 |
| 2024–25 | Blackwater | 17 | 14.4 | .424 | .333 | .000 | .700 | 1.6 | 1.4 | .2 | .1 | 5.8 |
| Career | | 73 | 13.2 | .403 | .313 | .000 | .662 | 1.5 | 1.4 | .4 | .1 | 5.3 |
