= MPBL All-Star Game Most Valuable Player award =

Annual Maharlika Pilipinas Basketball League award

The MPBL All-Star Game Most Valuable Player award is an annual Maharlika Pilipinas Basketball League award given to the best performing player of the league's All-Star Game. It was first awarded after the 2019 All-Star Game, its inaugural edition.

As of 2024, four players have won the award with Jeff Viernes being the only two-time recipient. Two other recipients, Jaycee Marcelino and Justine Baltazar, have also won Most Valuable Player, with the latter also winning Finals Most Valuable Player. The most recent recipient is Will McAloney.

== Winners ==
^	Denotes player who is still active in the MPBL
†	Denotes player who is still active outside of the MPBL
Player (#)	Denotes the number of times the player had been named All-Star Game MVP at that time
Team (#)	Denotes the number of times a player from this team had won at that time

Year	Player	Pos.	Team	Ref.
2019	Jeff Viernes^	G	Batangas City Athletics	
2020	Jeff Viernes^ (2)	G	Batangas City Athletics (2)	
2022	Jaycee Marcelino^	G	Zamboanga Family's Brand Sardines	
2023	Justine Baltazar^{†}	C	Pampanga Giant Lanterns	
2024	Will McAloney^	F	Nueva Ecija Rice Vanguards	
