= Will McAloney =

Filipino-Canadian basketball player

No. 14 – Quezon Huskers
- Position: Power forward / center
- League: MPBL

Personal information
- Born: September 1, 1993 (age 33)
- Listed height: 6 ft 5 in (1.96 m)

Career information
- College: San Carlos
- PBA draft: 2019: 2nd round, 15th overall pick
- Drafted by: NLEX Road Warriors

Career history
- 2018–2020: Cebu City Sharks / Cebu Casino Ethyl Alcohol
- 2021: NLEX Road Warriors
- 2021–2022: Blackwater Bossing
- 2022–2025: Nueva Ecija Capitals / Rice Vanguards
- 2026–present: Quezon Huskers

Career highlights
- MPBL champion (2022); 3× All-MPBL First Team (2022–2024); MPBL All-Star Game MVP (2024); 3× MPBL All-Star (2020, 2023, 2024); PSL Best Player of the Conference (2024); FilBasket champion (Summer 2022); CESAFI champion (2015)

William Bill McAloney Jr. (born September 1, 1993) is a Filipino-Canadian professional basketball player for the Quezon Huskers of the Maharlika Pilipinas Basketball League (MPBL).

In his collegiate career, he played for Emilio Aguinaldo College–Cavite and University of San Carlos; the latter with which he won the Cebu Schools Athletic Foundation, Inc. (CESAFI) basketball championship in 2015.

In 2018, he joined the Maharlika Pilipinas Basketball League as a member of the expansion Cebu City Sharks. In 2019, after playing for the Marinerong Pilipino Skippers of the PBA D-League he was selected 15th overall in the 2019 PBA draft by the NLEX Road Warriors. In 2021, McAloney was traded to the Blackwater Bossing but parted ways in 2022. In 2022, he joined the Nueva Ecija Rice Vanguards franchise, where he won a FilBasket championship, an MPBL championship, and got two nods to the All-MPBL First Team. He also won All-Star Game MVP and was selected as an all-star in the MPBL three times, all as a starter.

== College and amateur career ==
McAloney first played college basketball for Emilio Aguinaldo College–Cavite. After finishing his undergraduate studies, he returned to Cebu to play for the University of San Carlos, where he would eventually win a CESAFI championship in 2015.

In 2018, he joined the Maharlika Pilipinas Basketball League in its second season, playing for the Cebu City Sharks. Although he averaged 9.4 points in the season, he would breakout in the following 2019–20 season. McAloney was selected as an all-starter for the 2020 MPBL All-Star Game, and averaged a double-double that season. During this time, McAloney was also tapped by the Marinerong Pilipino Skippers to compete with the team in the PBA D-League.

== Professional career ==
=== NLEX Road Warriors (2020–2021) ===
During the 2019 PBA draft, McAloney was selected with the 15th pick by the NLEX Road Warriors. He averaged 6.3 points per game during the 2020 PBA Philippine Cup.

=== Blackwater Bossing (2021–2022) ===
In November 2021, NLEX traded McAloney and Mike Ayonayon to the Blackwater Bossing in exchange for Marion Magat and a second-round draft pick. In January 2022, McAloney would part ways with Blackwater after contract disagreements.

== Personal life ==
Will McAloney was hired as an inspector for PLDT prior to the start of his MPBL stint.

== Career statistics ==
=== MPBL ===
Legend
GP	Games played	GS	Games started	MPG	Minutes per game
FG%	Field-goal percentage	3P%	3-point field-goal percentage	FT%	Free-throw percentage
RPG	Rebounds per game	APG	Assists per game	SPG	Steals per game
BPG	Blocks per game	PPG	Points per game	**Bold**	Career high

==== Season-by-season averages ====
Year	Team	GP	GS	MPG	FG%	3P%	FT%	RPG	APG	SPG	BPG	PPG
2018–19	Cebu City	25	**19**	24.0	.531	.200	.574	8.1	1.2	0.6	0.8	9.4
2019–20	Cebu	26	14	**29.5**	.515	.148	.614	**10.4**	**1.7**	**1.0**	0.9	**16.9**
2022	Nueva Ecija	**32**	10	19.0	.551	.250	**.739**	6.8	1.5	0.3	**1.2**	10.3
2023	Nueva Ecija	27	11	22.3	**.600**	**.500**	.699	7.7	1.5	0.8	0.9	13.4
