= Joshua Yerro =

Filipino basketball player (born 2000)

No. 41 – Quezon Huskers
- Position: Shooting guard / small forward
- League: MPBL

Personal information
- Born: May 24, 2000 (age 26) Ormoc, Leyte, Philippines
- Listed height: 6 ft 1 in (1.85 m)
- Listed weight: 185 lb (84 kg)

Career information
- High school: UV (Cebu City)
- College: Adamson (2019–2024)
- PBA draft: 2025: 4th round, 41st overall pick
- Drafted by: Magnolia Chicken Timplados Hotshots
- Playing career: 2025–present

Career history
- 2025-present: Quezon Huskers

Joshua "Wawa" Cabilin Yerro (born May 24, 2000) is a Filipino professional basketball player for the Quezon Huskers of the Maharlika Pilipinas Basketball League (MPBL). After making a name in high school basketball in the Visayas, he committed to play for Adamson University in Manila and finish college studies.

Yerro doubled as a fish vendor and lechon cook during his early years as a student-athlete.

== High school career ==
Yerro first played varsity basketball for Linao Elementary School before his stints at Palarong Pambansa, representing Central Visayas. He was a top high school player from the Cebu Schools Athletic Foundation, Inc. (CESAFI).

=== UV Baby Lancers ===
Yerro played twice in the CESAFI juniors' championship series under the University of the Visayas (UV) Baby Lancers.

== Collegiate career ==
Following his mother's advice, Yerro chose to play in the UAAP under then Adamson head coach Franz Pumaren as top forward Sean Manganti left the Soaring Falcons to join the pro league PBA.

Yerro would later be the team captain in his last playing year.

=== Adamson Soaring Falcons ===
Yerro played three straight UAAP Final Four playoffs, with the Soaring Falcons triumphing against the De La Salle Green Archers and the UE Red Warriors from 2022 to 2024.

In a crucial game against Final Four contender National University Bulldogs, Yerro received an alley-oop inbound pass from Jhon Arthur Calisay with 0.3 seconds left, warded off an opponent's defense in mid-air, and hit an almost impossible buzzer-beater layup to win, 60-58, in the final year of the two senior standouts of assistant coach Gilbert Lao and head coach Nash Racela in Season 87 of the UAAP at the Araneta Coliseum on September 25, 2024.

== Personal life ==
In October 2018, Yerro dedicated the best-of-three titular showdown of his high school team against the University of Cebu to his mother, who died that month.
