= All-MPBL Team =

Maharlika Pilipinas Basketball League honor

The All-MPBL Team is a Maharlika Pilipinas Basketball League (MPBL) honour given to the league's best players. It was first presented during the 2018–19 MPBL season. Two All-MPBL Teams are honoured in each season, with the exception of 2022, which only had the First Team.

As of 2025, only one player, Jaycee Marcelino have been selected to an All-MPBL Team four times.

== Selections ==
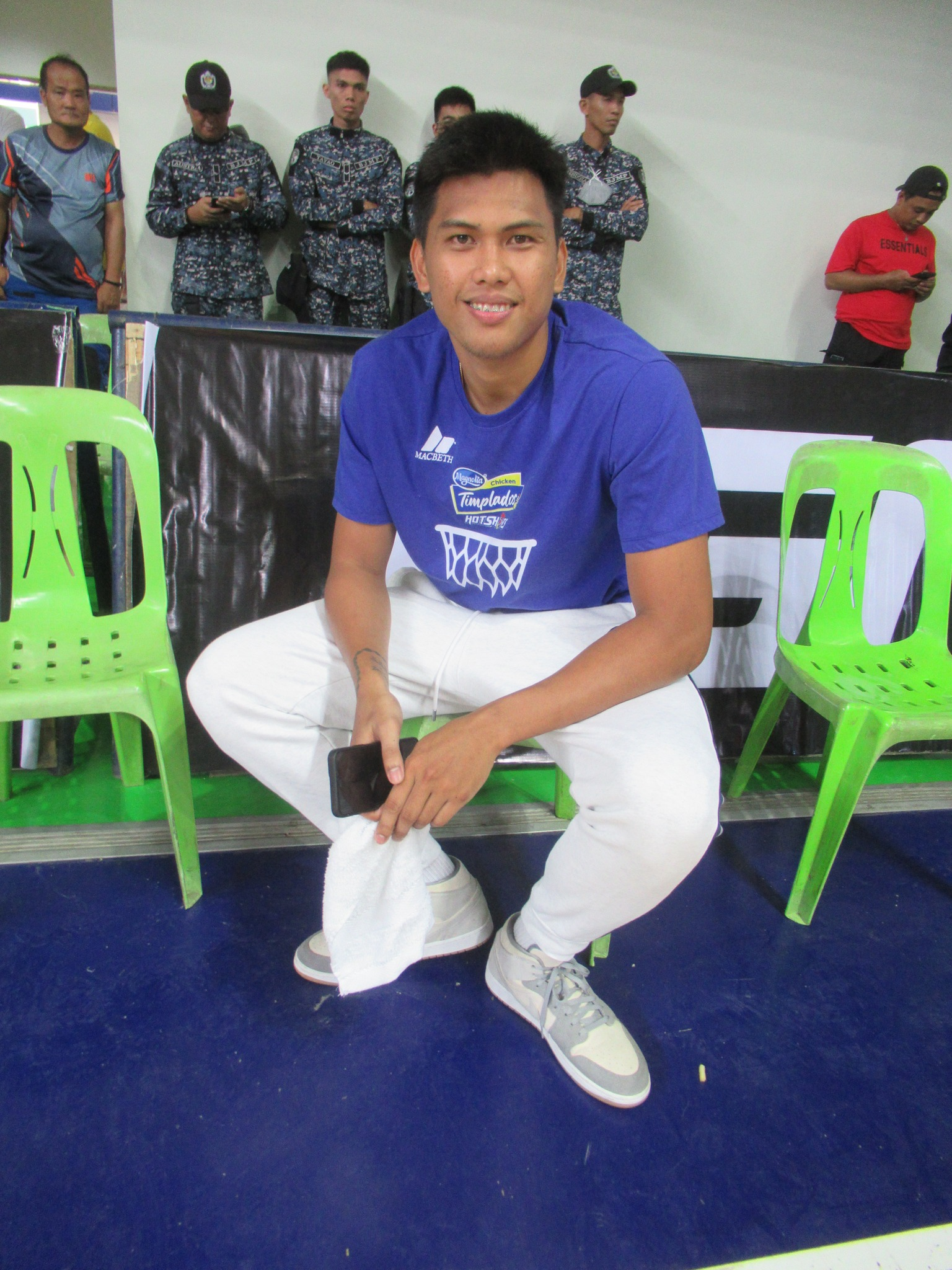
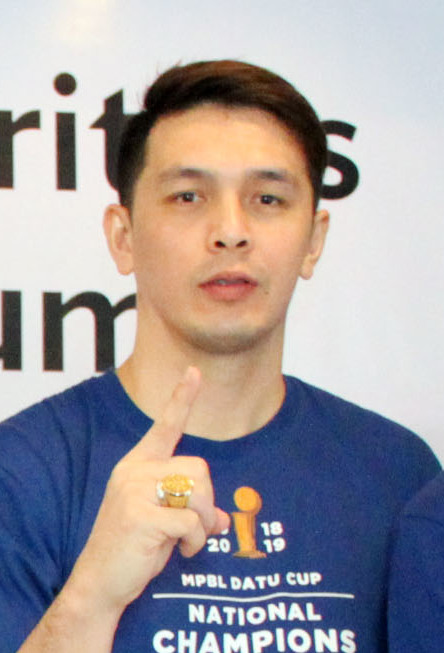
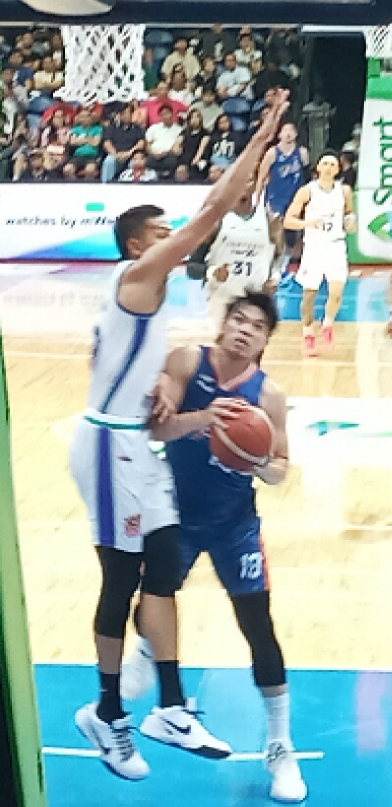
Aris Dionisio (top), John Wilson (middle), and Justine Baltazar (bottom) are among the players with at least two All-MPBL selections.

^	Denotes player who is still active in the MPBL
†	Denotes player who is still active outside of the MPBL
(#)	Denotes the number of times the player has been selected
**Bold**	Indicates the player who won the MPBL Most Valuable Player in the same year

Season	First team		Second team		Ref.
Season	Players	Teams	Players	Teams	Ref.
2018–19	**Gab Banal**^	Bacoor City Strikers	Harold Arboleda^{†}	Zamboanga Family's Brand Sardines	
2018–19	Chris Bitoon^	Manila Stars	Michael Mabulac^	Laguna Heroes	
2018–19	Aris Dionisio^{†}	Manila Stars	Leo Najorda^	Davao Occidental Tigers	
2018–19	Allan Mangahas	Muntinlupa Cagers	Jai Reyes	Navotas Clutch	
2018–19	Mark Yee^	Davao Occidental Tigers	John Wilson^	San Juan Knights	
2019–20	Jeckster Apinan^	Makati Super Crunch	Gab Banal^ (2)	Bacoor City Strikers	
2019–20	Mike Ayonayon^	San Juan Knights	Chris Bitoon^ (2)	Manila Stars	
2019–20	Jeric Teng	Pasig Sta. Lucia Realtors	Aris Dionisio^{†} (2)	Manila Stars	
2019–20	**John Wilson**^ (2)	San Juan Knights	John Raymundo^	GenSan Warriors	
2019–20	Mark Yee^ (2)	Davao Occidental Tigers	Dhon Reverente^	Pasay Voyagers	
2022	Cedric Ablaza^	Batangas City Embassy Chill	Not awarded		
2022	Judel Fuentes^	San Juan Knights	Not awarded		
2022	Hesed Gabo^	Nueva Ecija Rice Vanguards	Not awarded		
2022	**Jaycee Marcelino**^	Zamboanga Family's Brand Sardines	Not awarded		
2022	Will McAloney^	Nueva Ecija Rice Vanguards	Not awarded		
2023	**Justine Baltazar**^{†}	Pampanga Giant Lanterns	Jeckster Apinan^ (2)	Batangas City Embassy Chill	
2023	Jaycee Marcelino^ (2)	Zamboanga Family's Brand Sardines	Robby Celiz^	Makati OKBet Kings	
2023	Will McAloney^ (2)	Nueva Ecija Rice Vanguards	Archie Concepcion^{†}	Pampanga Giant Lanterns	
2023	Jhan Nermal^	Bacoor City Strikers	Ryan Costelo^	Pasig City MCW Sports	
2023	Orlan Wamar Jr.^	San Juan Knights	James Kwekuteye^	Bacoor City Strikers	
2024	Cedric Ablaza^ (2)	Batangas City Tanduay Rum Masters	Robby Celiz^ (2)	Nueva Ecija Rice Vanguards	
2024	**Justine Baltazar**^{†} (2)	Pampanga Giant Lanterns	Archie Concepcion^{†} (2)	Pampanga Giant Lanterns	
2024	Jaycee Marcelino^ (3)	Zamboanga Master Sardines	Ljay Gonzales ^{†}	Quezon Huskers	
2024	Will McAloney^ (3)	Nueva Ecija Rice Vanguards	JP Sarao^	Parañaque Patriots	
2024	Orlan Wamar Jr.^ (2)	San Juan Knights	Greg Slaughter	Manila Batang Sampaloc	
2025	Christian Fajarito^	Pasay Voyagers	Eric Camson^	Rizal Golden Coolers	
2025	Ljay Gonzales ^{†} (2)	Quezon Huskers	Levi Hernandez^	Batangas City Tanduay Rum Masters	
2025	**Dave Ildefonso**^	Abra Solid North Weavers	Jaycee Marcelino^ (4)	Nueva Ecija Rice Vanguards	
2025	Vic Manuel^	Pangasinan Heatwaves	Larry Muyang^{†}	Pampanga Giant Lanterns	
2025	Kenny Rocacurva	Biñan Tatak Gel	Orlan Wamar Jr.^ (3)	San Juan Knights	

== Most selections ==
The following table only lists players with at least two total selections.

^	Denotes player who is still active in the MPBL
†	Denotes player who is still active outside of the MPBL

Player	Total	First team	Second team	MVP	Seasons
Jaycee Marcelino^	4	3	1	1	4
Will McAloney^	3	3	0	0	5
Orlan Wamar Jr.^	3	2	1	0	6
Cedric Ablaza^	2	2	0	0	5
Justine Baltazar^{†}	2	2	0	2	2
Mark Yee^	2	2	0	0	3
Jeckster Apinan^	2	1	1	0	5
Gab Banal^	2	1	1	0	5
Chris Bitoon^	2	1	1	0	5
Aris Dionisio^{†}	2	1	1	0	2
Ljay Gonzales^{†}	2	1	1	0	2
John Wilson^	2	1	1	0	4
Robby Celiz^	2	0	2	0	4
Archie Concepcion^{†}	2	0	2	0	3
