= Quezon Huskers =

Professional basketball team in Quezon, Philippines

- 2026 Quezon Huskers season
- League: URBL (2004–2005); MPBL (2023–present); PSL (2023–2024)
- Founded: 2004; 22 years ago (first incarnation); 2023; 3 years ago (second incarnation)
- History: Quezon Coco Huskers; 2004–2005 (URBL); Quezon Huskers; 2023–present (MPBL); Quezon Titans; 2023–2024 (PSL)
- Arena: Quezon Convention Center; Lucena Convention Center
- Location: Lucena, Quezon
- Team colors
- Head coach: Eric Gonzales
- Championships: PSL: 1 (2024)
- Conference titles: MPBL: 3 (2024, 2025, 2026)

The Quezon Huskers are a Filipino professional basketball team based in Lucena, a highly urbanized city in the province of Quezon. The team competes in the Maharlika Pilipinas Basketball League (MPBL) as a member of the league's South Division. The team splits its home games between Quezon Convention Center and Lucena Convention Center.

The team's first incarnation was the Quezon Coco Huskers of the United Regional Basketball League (URBL). The team ran from 2004 until 2005. The Huskers were then revived as an expansion team for the MPBL's 2023 season alongside the Negros Muscovados. The team also competes Pilipinas Super League (PSL) under the name Quezon Titans. Owned by the Provincial Government of Quezon, the Huskers also have a volleyball counterpart in the Maharlika Pilipinas Volleyball Association in the Quezon Tangerines.

The Huskers are one of five teams based in the Calabarzon region. The Quezon franchise won one championship, during the PSL's President's Cup in 2024.

== History ==
=== First incarnation (2004–2005) ===
The team began play in 2004, when it was part of the now-defunct URBL.

=== Second incarnation (2023–present) ===
==== Maharlika Pilipinas Basketball League ====
In January 2023, the MPBL announced that the league would be getting a new expansion team for the 2023 season. Later that month, Quezon Governor Angelina Tan announced that the team would be based in the province of Quezon. The team's name was later revealed as the Quezon Huskers. With the Huskers joining, Quezon became the last province in Calabarzon to have an MPBL team.

The team hosted the 2023 season opener, where they faced off against fellow expansion team Negros Muscovados. The Huskers pulled off a comeback in the second half to beat the Muscovados, 82–80. The Huskers would then go on a seven-game winning streak to begin their inaugural season and eventually finish with a record of 19–9, clinching the fifth seed in the South Division. Quezon became the first team in the professional era to make the playoffs in its inaugural season. Despite forcing a game 3 in the First Round, the team would lose to the defending South champion Zamboanga Family's Brand Sardines.

==== Pilipinas Super League ====
In October 2023, Quezon announced its entry to the PSL during the MPBL offseason. The team will be referred to as the Quezon Titans.

== Team identity ==
The name Huskers alludes to Quezon Province's moniker as the "Coconut Capital of the Philippines'. It can also be a nod to the team's previous incarnation.

When the Huskers joined the MPBL in 2023, Governor Angelina Tan also announced a name-the-team contest, where anyone based in Quezon Province can submit a concept design of the team's identity. The contest was won by Ardocir Torio from Lucena, with an illustration of a carabao breaking the shell of a coconut. The same logo would be later used for the Quezon Junior Huskers. For their PSL debut later that year, the team used the Titans moniker.

== Current roster ==
Quezon Huskers roster
Players

Pos.	No.	Name	Height	Weight	DOB	From
G	1	Erl Bajal (HG)	6 ft 0 in (1.83 m)		2002-05-19	UST
G	2	Judel Ric Fuentes	5 ft 10 in (1.78 m)		1998–10–11	Centro Escolar
F	3	Michael Cañete	6 ft 4 in (1.93 m)		1993–08–14	Arellano
G	5	Dominick Vera (HG)	5 ft 11 in (1.80 m)		1993–08–15	San Sebastian
G	6	Diego Dario	5 ft 8 in (1.73 m)	145 lb (66 kg)	1997–01–06	UP
G/F	7	Joseph Peñaredondo	6 ft 3 in (1.91 m)		1998–07–01	St. Clare of Caloocan
G/F	8	Christian Pagaran	6 ft 2 in (1.88 m)		1999–04–07	UPHSD
G	9	Clint Escamis	5 ft 11 in (1.80 m)		2000-10-13	Mapúa
F	10	Cedrick Manzano	6 ft 5 in (1.96 m)	185 lb (84 kg)	2003–03–05	Adamson
G	11	John Abate (FF)	6 ft 1 in (1.85 m)		2000–12–24	UE
F/C	14	Will McAloney (FF)	6 ft 5 in (1.96 m)		1993–09–01	San Carlos
G	15	Cyrus Tabi	5 ft 8 in (1.73 m)		1995–02–03	RTU
G	16	Yvan Ludovice	5 ft 10 in (1.78 m)			San Beda
F	17	Jason Opiso	6 ft 2 in (1.88 m)		1994–03–17	Centro Escolar
G	20	Christopher Lagrama (HG)	5 ft 3 in (1.60 m)
F	21	Rodel Gravera (HG)	6 ft 4 in (1.93 m)		1996–05–12	Far Eastern
F	22	Jolo Manansala	6 ft 4 in (1.93 m)		2001–10–05	National-U
G	29	Alvin Abundo	5 ft 8 in (1.73 m)	150 lb (68 kg)	1992–10–29	Centro Escolar
F/C	31	Chris Lalata	6 ft 5 in (1.96 m)	198 lb (90 kg)	1995–01–09	Olivarez
F	34	Lander Canon	6 ft 4 in (1.93 m)		1999-11-20	PCC
G/F	41	Joshua Yerro	6 ft 1 in (1.85 m)	185 lb (84 kg)	2000–05–24	Adamson
G/F	44	Cholo Añonuevo	6 ft 4 in (1.93 m)			Far Eastern
F	77	Gab Banal	6 ft 3 in (1.91 m)	200 lb (91 kg)	1990–09–09	Mapúa

Coaches

Head coach

- Eric Gonzales

Assistant coach(es)

- Nash Racela
- Richie Ticzon
- Ed Dela Torre
- Luis Nolasco
- Jonathan de Guzman
- Bernard de Guia
- Jeric Teng

Team manager

- Donn Kapunan

Legend

- (HG) Homegrown
- (FF) Filipino-foreigner
- (EA) EASL player
- (RS) Reserve player
- (S) Suspended
- Injured

- Roster – via Genius Sports
Updated as of: June 22, 2026

=== Head coaches ===
Quezon Huskers head coaches
#	Name	Start	End	Achievements	Ref.
1	Eric Gonzales	2023	current	2x Division champion (2024, 2025)	

== Notable players ==
=== Individual award winners ===
MPBL Rookie of the Year

- LJay Gonzales – 2024

All-MPBL First Team

- LJay Gonzales – 2025

All-MPBL Second Team

- LJay Gonzales – 2024

=== MPBL All-Star Day ===
All-Star selections

- Mark Alcala – 2023
- Alfrancis Tamsi – 2023
- Ljay Gonzales – 2024, 2025
- Ximone Sandagon – 2024

All-Star Game head coaches

- Eric Gonzales – 2025

=== PBA players ===
Ex-PBA players

- Alvin Abundo
- Gab Banal
- Diego Dario
- Jeric Teng
- Will McAloney

Drafted to PBA

- Ljay Gonzales – 5th overall, season 50
- Will Gozum – 8th overall, season 50

== Season-by-season records ==
League champions
Division champions
Qualified for playoffs
Best regular season record

=== Maharlika Pilipinas Basketball League ===
Season	Regular season							Playoffs	
Season	Division	Finish	GP	W	L	PCT	GB	Stage	Results
Quezon Huskers
2023	South	5th	28	19	9	.679	4	Division quarterfinals	lost vs. Zamboanga, 1–2
2024	South	1st	28	21	7	.750	–	Division quarterfinals Division semifinals Division finals National finals	won vs. Negros, 2–0 won vs. Parañaque, 2–0 won vs. Batangas City, 2–1 lost vs. Pampanga, 0–3
2025	South	1st	29	25	4	.862	–	Division quarterfinals Division semifinals Division finals National finals	won vs. Mindoro, 2–0 won vs. General Santos, 2–0 won vs. Biñan, 3–2 lost vs. Abra, 0–3
2026	South	1st	25	21	4	.840	–	Division quarterfinals Division semifinals Division finals National finals	won vs. Zamboanga, 2–1 won vs. Cebu, 2–0 won vs. Biñan, 3–1; TBD vs. Abra
All-time regular season record			110	86	24	.782		4 playoff appearances	
All-time playoff record			34	21	13	.618		3 Finals appearances	
All-time overall record			144	107	37	.743		0 championships	

=== Pilipinas Super League ===
Season	Elimination round				Playoffs	
Season	Finish	W	L	PCT	Stage	Results
Quezon Titans
2023–24; President's Cup	5th	14	4	.778	First Round; Quarterfinals; Semifinals; Finals	won vs. Novaliches, 1–0 won vs. Caloocan, 2–0 won vs. Biñan, 2–0 won vs. Nueva Ecija, 3–1
All-time elimination round record		14	4	.778	1 playoff appearance	
All-time playoff record		8	1	.889	1 Finals appearance	
All-time overall record		22	5	.815	1 championship	
