= Eric Gonzales =

Filipino basketball coach (born 1972)

Quezon Huskers
- Position: Head coach
- League: MPBL

Personal information
- Born: September 3, 1972 (age 54)

Career information
- High school: RMHS (Manila)
- College: UST
- Coaching career: 2009–present

Career history

Coaching
- 2009–2010: NU (assistant)
- 2010–2011: NU
- 2011–2012: NU (assistant)
- 2014–2015: GlobalPort Batang Pier
- 2015–2022: FEU (assistant)
- 2015–2016: GlobalPort Batang Pier (assistant)
- 2016: GlobalPort Batang Pier
- 2016–2018: GlobalPort Batang Pier (assistant)
- 2018: TNT KaTropa (assistant)
- 2019–2021: Iloilo United Royals
- 2023–present: Quezon Huskers
- 2024–present: UP (assistant)

Career highlights
- As assistant coach: PCCL champion (2015); 2× UAAP seniors champion (2015, 2024)

Manolito "Eric" Gonzales Jr. (born September 3, 1972) is a Filipino professional basketball coach, currently serves as a head coach for the Quezon Huskers in the Maharlika Pilipinas Basketball League (MPBL).

== Coaching career ==
=== Early days ===
Gonzales is a former University of Santo Tomas track and field star from 1992 to 1994. He started his coaching career by serving as an assistant for Binky Favis in 1995 with the Tiger Cubs. There, he slowly built his résumé while coaching in the minor leagues for the St. Stephen High School with his brother Warren Gonzales, and would later spend time on the Purefoods and Coca-Cola benches.

=== NU Bulldogs ===
In 2009, he was tapped as an assistant coach for NU Bulldogs under Manny Dandan. He was later promoted as head coach in 2010, with Eric Altamirano as consultant. But after the season, Altamirano was promoted to head coach while Gonzales was demoted as an assistant.

=== GlobalPort Batang Pier ===
At GlobalPort, he served as an assistant to coaches Junel Baculi and Ritchie Ticzon. He was the longtime deputy coach to Nash Racela at Far Eastern University.

Prior to the 2014–15 PBA season, he was again called up to the Batang Pier bench by no less than team owner Mikee Romero, and acted as the lead assistant for coach Pido Jarencio. Nine games into the season, he was given the head coaching job on an interim basis after Romero decided to relieve Jarencio from his coaching duties.

In his head coaching debut, he won the game in a blowout fashion for GlobalPort against Barangay Ginebra on November 30, 2014.

On March 31, 2015, Gonzales was relegated as the team's assistant coach, while reappointing team consultant Pido Jarencio as the head coach.

In May 2016, GlobalPort reappointed Gonzales as their head coach, replacing Jarencio, following the appointment of Franz Pumaren as the team consultant.

=== FEU Tamaraws and TNT KaTropa ===
Since 2015, Gonzales served as an assistant coach for FEU Tamaraws under Nash Racela. He stayed even his older brother Olsen was replaced the latter.

Gonzales also served as TNT KaTropa assistant coach.

On September 2, 2018, TNT named Gonzales as interim head coach after previous coach Nash Racela went on indefinite leave after a poor 1–4 start to the 2018 Governors' Cup.

=== UP Fighting Maroons ===
As of 2024, Gonzales is also an assistant coach for the UP Fighting Maroons. He won a championship with them in Season 87.

| Preceded by Pido Jarencio | GlobalPort Batang Pier (interim) Head coach 2014-2015 | Succeeded by Pido Jarencio |
