= Quezon Convention Center =

Multi-purpose convention center in Quezon, Philippines

- QCC
- façade of the convention center

- Location within Luzon Location within Philippines
- Location: Lucena City, Quezon, Philippines
- Coordinates: 13°55′42″N 121°36′50″E
- Capacity: 7000

Construction
- Opened: 2001

Tenants
- Philippine Basketball Association (out-of-town games); Quezon Huskers (MPBL) (2023–); Liga Pilipinas; Philippine Basketball League (2002–2003)

The Quezon Convention Center is a multi-purpose convention center in Quezon located near the Provincial Capitol in Lucena, Quezon, Philippines. The venue has hosted local and regional basketball competitions, concerts, and conferences.

President Gloria Macapagal Arroyo led the inauguration rites of the facility on August 19, 2002. It was constructed using the savings of the Quezon provincial government.

The arena hosted a number of concerts and fine performances such as Sharon Cuneta, Gary Valenciano, Pops Fernandez, Martin Nievera, Regine Velasquez, Kyla, the Apo Hiking Society, Sam Milby and Kim Chiu, Wolfgang, and Aiza Seguerra. Even international artist gospel singer-songwriter Don Moen has performed in the arena.

The arena has also held games for various sports leagues, including the Philippine Basketball Association, Maharlika Pilipinas Basketball League, Liga Pilipinas, and Philippine Basketball League. It became the home arena of the expansion Quezon Huskers of the MPBL from 2023.

Events and tenants
Preceded by first venue	Home of the Quezon Huskers; 2023–present	Succeeded by current
Preceded by Smart Araneta Coliseum	Host of the PBA All-Star Game; 2017	Succeeded by Batangas City Sports Coliseum; Davao del Sur Coliseum; University of San Agustin
