= 2009–2010 ABL team rosters =

This is a list of ASEAN Basketball League team rosters for the inaugural season (2009-2010).

This list denotes the entire roster fielded in by ABL teams for the duration of the inaugural season. Flags denote the player's place of birth.

== Brunei Barracudas ==
Brunei Darussalam Barracudas roster
Players
Coaches

| Pos. | No. | Nat. | Name | Ht. | Wt. |
|---|---|---|---|---|---|
| SF | 0 | (Philippines) | Faundo, Bryan (I) | 1.98 m (6 ft 6 in) | 100 kg (220 lb) |
| C | 1 | (United States) | Garnett, Chris (I) | 2.05 m (6 ft 9 in) | 118 kg (260 lb) |
| SG | 3 | (Brunei) | Lim, Benjamin |
| PF | 6 | (Brunei) | Tan, Esmond (C) | 1.89 m (6 ft 2 in) |
| SG | 8 | (Philippines) | Tolomia, Chester (I) | 1.88 m (6 ft 2 in) | 77 kg (170 lb) |
| SG | 9 | (Brunei) | Lim, Ee Fu |
| SG | 11 | (Brunei) | Khalidi, Afif |
| PF | 12 | (Brunei) | Ho, Presley |
| PG | 18 | (Brunei) | Ramlee, Muhammad Jamri |
| SF | 19 | (Brunei) | Noordin, Mizi |
| F | 24 | (United States) | Commons, Chris (I) | 2.05 m (6 ft 9 in) | 100 kg (220 lb) |
| SF | 27 | (Brunei) | Suhaili, Hj. Mohammad Badri |
| PG | 35 | (Philippines) | Williams, Ramsey (I) | 1.85 m (6 ft 1 in) |

Head coach

- (Philippines) Geraldo "Bong" Ramos

Assistant coach(es)

- (Brunei) Wong Yee Chai
- (United States) Ozell Wells

Legend

- (C) Team captain
- (I) Import player
- Injured

- Roster
Updated: 2010-09-14

== Kuala Lumpur Dragons ==
Kuala Lumpur Dragons roster
Players
Coaches

| Pos. | No. | Nat. | Name | Ht. | Wt. |
|---|---|---|---|---|---|
| G | 12 | (Philippines) | Bandaying, Fhadzmir (I) | 1.80 m (5 ft 11 in) | 77 kg (170 lb) |
| F/C | 22 | (United States) | Brown, Jammal (I) | 1.98 m (6 ft 6 in) |
| SG | 24 | (Malaysia) | Chan, Chze Hian | 1.79 m (5 ft 10 in) | 69 kg (152 lb) |
| F/C | 33 | (Malaysia) | Chee, Li Wei | 1.97 m (6 ft 6 in) | 96 kg (212 lb) |
| G/F | 88 | (Malaysia) | Batumalai, Guganeswaran | 1.80 m (5 ft 11 in) | 83 kg (183 lb) |
| G/F | 5 | (Malaysia) | Ho, Yeow Loong | 1.78 m (5 ft 10 in) | 62 kg (137 lb) |
| F | 18 | (Philippines) | Hugnatan, Roel (I) | 1.93 m (6 ft 4 in) |
| F/C | 14 | (Malaysia) | Koh, Way Tek | 1.93 m (6 ft 4 in) | 92 kg (203 lb) |
| F | 3 | (Cameroon) | Kuete, Chris (I) | 1.93 m (6 ft 4 in) |
| G/F | 84 | (Malaysia) | Kwaan, Yoong Jing | 1.98 m (6 ft 6 in) | 85 kg (187 lb) |
| G | 10 | (Philippines) | Lingganay, Rudy (I) | 1.75 m (5 ft 9 in) | 70 kg (154 lb) |
| G | 20 | (Malaysia) | Loh, Shee Fai | 1.92 m (6 ft 4 in) | 85 kg (187 lb) |
| F/C | 30 | (United States) | Lynch, Chris (I) | 1.98 m (6 ft 6 in) |
| PF | 11 | (Malaysia) | Ng, Yeo Seng | 1.90 m (6 ft 3 in) | 91 kg (201 lb) |
| SG | 1 | (Malaysia) | Wee, Chuan Chin | 1.80 m (5 ft 11 in) | 70 kg (154 lb) |
| C | 13 | (Malaysia) | Yeow, Kee Aik | 1.95 m (6 ft 5 in) | 92 kg (203 lb) |

Head coach

- (Malaysia) Goh Cheng Huat

Assistant coach(es)

- (Malaysia) Soo Eng Heng

Legend

- (C) Team captain
- (I) Import player
- Injured

- Roster
Updated: 2009-10-27

== Philippine Patriots ==
Philippine Patriots roster
Players
Coaches

| Pos. | No. | Nat. | Name | Ht. | Wt. | Age |
|---|---|---|---|---|---|---|---|
| G/F | 8 | (Philippines) | Val Acuña | 6 ft 3 in (1.91 m) | 170 lb (77 kg) | | UE |
| G | 0 | (Philippines) | JP Alcaraz | 5 ft 11 in (1.80 m) | | | Letran |
| F/C | 7 | (Philippines) | Mark Andaya | 6 ft 10 in (2.08 m) | 220 lb (100 kg) | | Letran |
| F/C | 21 | (Philippines) | Nonoy Baclao | 6 ft 5 in (1.96 m) | 190 lb (86 kg) | | Ateneo |
| PG | 27 | (Philippines) | Froilan Baguion | 5 ft 11 in (1.80 m) | 170 lb (77 kg) | | National-U |
| PG | 4 | (Philippines) | Christian Coronel | 5 ft 8 in (1.73 m) | 160 lb (73 kg) | | San Sebastian |
| F | -- | (Philippines) | Nathaniel Cruz | 6 ft 7 in (2.01 m) | 200 lb (91 kg) | | Mapúa |
| F/C | 15 | (Philippines) | Dino Daa | 6 ft 6 in (1.98 m) | 190 lb (86 kg) | | Letran |
| C | 42 | (United States) | Jason Dixon (C / I) | 6 ft 10 in (2.08 m) | 242 lb (110 kg) | | Liberty |
| F/C | 9 | (Philippines) | Elmer Espiritu | 6 ft 3 in (1.91 m) | 175 lb (79 kg) | | UE |
| F | 25 | (United States) | Gabe Freeman (I) | 6 ft 6 in (1.98 m) | 205 lb (93 kg) | | Mesa CC |
| F | 16 | (Philippines) | Jerwin Gaco | 6 ft 3 in (1.91 m) | 180 lb (82 kg) | | De La Salle |
| G | 14 | (Philippines) | Khasim Mirza | 6 ft 5 in (1.96 m) | 195 lb (88 kg) | | UST |
| G | 19 | (Philippines) | Hafer Mondragon | 6 ft 7 in (2.01 m) | 190 lb (86 kg) | | Letran |
| G | 1 | (United States) | Brandon Powell (I) | 6 ft 6 in (1.98 m) | 190 lb (86 kg) | | Florida |
| F | 28 | (Philippines) | Neil Rañeses | 6 ft 4 in (1.93 m) | 190 lb (86 kg) | | Visayas |
| PG | -- | (Philippines) | Ricky Ricafuente | 5 ft 9 in (1.75 m) | 160 lb (73 kg) | | TIP |
| G | 34 | (Philippines) | Erwin Sta. Maria | 6 ft 6 in (1.98 m) | 190 lb (86 kg) | | Mapúa |
| G | 5 | (United States) | Wainwright, Rob (C) | 6 ft 7 in (2.01 m) | 200 lb (91 kg) | | Solano CC |
| G | 3 | (Philippines) | Warren Ybañez | 5 ft 7 in (1.70 m) | 155 lb (70 kg) | | PSBA |

Head coach
- (Philippines) Louie Alas (Adamson)
Assistant(s)
- (Philippines) Bogs Adornado (UST)
- (Philippines) Ryan Dy (SCSIT)
- (Philippines) Allan Gamboa (UP Diliman)

Legend
- (DP) Unsigned draft pick
- (FA) Free agent
- (S) Suspended
- *(I) = Import
- Injured

== Satria Muda ==
Satria Muda roster
Players
Coaches

| Pos. | No. | Nat. | Name | Ht. | Wt. |
|---|---|---|---|---|---|
| SF | 4 | (Philippines) | Bajar, Rensy (I) | 2.06 m (6 ft 9 in) |
| PG | 5 | (Indonesia) | Achmad, Faisal | 1.80 m (5 ft 11 in) |
| PG | 6 | (Indonesia) | Wijaya, Wendha | 1.80 m (5 ft 11 in) |
| SF | 7 | (Indonesia) | Prihantono, Amin | 1.87 m (6 ft 2 in) |
| PF | 8 | (United States) | Hartman, Alexander (I) | 2.02 m (6 ft 8 in) |
| F | 9 | (Indonesia) | Sondakh, Youbel | 1.90 m (6 ft 3 in) |
| C | 10 | (United States) | Little, Theo (I) | 2.11 m (6 ft 11 in) |
| C | 11 | (Indonesia) | Gunawan, Galang | 1.95 m (6 ft 5 in) |
| PF | 12 | (Indonesia) | Siregar, Bonanza |
| C | 13 | (Indonesia) | Gunawan, Ronny | 1.93 m (6 ft 4 in) | 90 kg (198 lb) |
| PF | 14 | (Indonesia) | Situmorang, Welyanson | 1.88 m (6 ft 2 in) |
| F/C | 15 | (Indonesia) | Sitepu, Christian | 2.01 m (6 ft 7 in) |
| PG | 18 | (Indonesia) | Wuysang, Mario (I) | 1.78 m (5 ft 10 in) |
| F/C | 43 | (United States) | Miller, Nakiea (I) | 2.05 m (6 ft 9 in) |

Head coach

- (Indonesia) Fictor Roring

Legend

- (C) Team captain
- (I) Import player
- Injured

- Roster
Updated: 2009-09-27

== Singapore Slingers ==
Singapore Slingers roster
Players
Coaches

| Pos. | No. | Nat. | Name | Ht. | Wt. |
|---|---|---|---|---|---|
| G | 10 | (Singapore) | Hong, Wei Jian | 1.80 m (5 ft 11 in) | 65 kg (143 lb) |
| C | 31 | (United States) | Jeffers, Kyle (C / I) | 2.06 m (6 ft 9 in) | 120 kg (265 lb) |
| F | 13 | (Singapore) | Khoo, Kian Huat | 1.88 m (6 ft 2 in) | 85 kg (187 lb) |
| F | 35 | (United States) | LeBlanc, Michael (I) | 2.02 m (6 ft 8 in) | 105 kg (231 lb) |
| F | 14 | (Singapore) | Lim, Wai Sian | 1.88 m (6 ft 2 in) | 85 kg (187 lb) |
| F | 15 | (Singapore) | Matialakan, Pathman | 2.02 m (6 ft 8 in) | 102 kg (225 lb) |
| G | 21 | (Australia) | Ng, Marcus (I) | 1.89 m (6 ft 2 in) | 76 kg (168 lb) |
| G | 2 | (Singapore) | Oh, Wei Jie | 1.76 m (5 ft 9 in) | 75 kg (165 lb) |
| - | 12 | (Singapore) | Sadasivan, Prasad |
| G | 19 | (Philippines) | Vergara, Al (I) | 1.70 m (5 ft 7 in) | 75 kg (165 lb) |
| G | 11 | (Singapore) | Wong, Soon Yuh (C) | 1.80 m (5 ft 11 in) | 80 kg (176 lb) |
| G | 5 | (Singapore) | Wong, Wei Long | 1.74 m (5 ft 9 in) | 77 kg (170 lb) |

Head coach

- (Australia) Frank Arsego

Assistant coach(es)

- (Singapore) Neo Beng Siang

Legend

- (C) Team captain
- Injured

- Roster
Updated: 2009-11-02

== Thailand Tigers ==
Thailand Tigers roster
Players
Coaches

| Pos. | No. | Nat. | Name | Ht. | Wt. | Age |
|---|---|---|---|---|---|---|
| PG | 69 | (Thailand) | Apiromvilaichai Jr, Darongpan | 1.85 m (6 ft 1 in) |
| SG | 96 | (Thailand) | Apiromvilaichai Sr, Darunpong | 1.95 m (6 ft 5 in) |
| F | 11 | (Philippines) | Bolocon, Glenn (I) | 1.91 m (6 ft 3 in) |
| - | 35 | (United States) | Briggs, Chaz (I) | 2.01 m (6 ft 7 in) | 95 kg (209 lb) |
| SF | 14 | (Philippines) | Doruelo, Axel (I) | 1.99 m (6 ft 6 in) |
| SG | 34 | (Thailand) | Ghogar, Sukdave (I) | 2.01 m (6 ft 7 in) | 95 kg (209 lb) |
| F | 24 | (Thailand) | Kaedum, Chaiwat | 1.95 m (6 ft 5 in) | 82 kg (181 lb) |
| SG | 12 | (Thailand) | Kruatiwa, Ratdech | 1.91 m (6 ft 3 in) | 82 kg (181 lb) |
| SG | 55 | (Thailand) | Lertmalaiporn, Attaporn | 2.01 m (6 ft 7 in) | 95 kg (209 lb) |
| PG | 6 | (Thailand) | Muangboon, Nappakarn |
| C | 35 | (United States) | Nwankwo, Ikenna (I) | 2.11 m (6 ft 11 in) |
| F | 23 | (Thailand) | Piroon, Piyapong | 2.01 m (6 ft 7 in) | 95 kg (209 lb) |
| SF | 19 | (Philippines) | Ricafuente, Ricky (I) | 1.99 m (6 ft 6 in) | 73 kg (161 lb) |
| C | 8 | (Thailand) | Ruankam, Chattipak | 2.01 m (6 ft 7 in) | 95 kg (209 lb) |
| PF | 17 | (Thailand) | Sirichumchai, Sorranut | 2.01 m (6 ft 7 in) | 95 kg (209 lb) |

Head coach

- (United States) Chuck Davisson
- (Thailand) Mawinporn Soonpornthont

Assistant coach(es)

Legend

- (C) Team captain
- (I) Import player
- Injured

- Roster
Updated: 2009-10-19
