= 2010 ABL playoffs =

The 2010 ASEAN Basketball League (ABL) playoffs was the first season of competition since its establishment. A total of four teams competed in the league. It started on 30 January 2010, after the 2009–10 ABL season ended.

The Philippine Patriots of the Philippines won the first ABL championship after defeating Satria Muda BritAma of Indonesia, 3-0, in their best-of-five championship series which ended on 21 February 2010.

The Kuala Lumpur Dragons had managed to secure a playoff berth after it improved in the later stages of the season.

== Bracket ==
Best-of-3 semifinals
1	Philippine Patriots	2
4	Kuala Lumpur Dragons	0
2	Singapore Slingers	1
3	SM BritAma	2

Best-of-5 finals
1	Philippine Patriots	3
3	SM BritAma	0

== Semifinals ==
=== Patriots vs. Dragons ===
31 January

Kuala Lumpur Dragons	43–77	Philippine Patriots

Ynares Sports Arena, Pasig
Referees: Andy Cheung (HKG), Lucky Adhi Nugroho (INA), Le Viet Duc (VIE)

3 February

Philippine Patriots	70–65	Kuala Lumpur Dragons
Patriots win series 2–0

MABA Stadium, Kuala Lumpur
Referees: Amarjot Singh Mavi (IND), Dwi Cahyo Kartiko (INA), Goh Poh Seng (SIN)

=== Slingers vs. Satria Muda ===
31 January

SM BritAma	68–87	Singapore Slingers

Singapore Indoor Stadium, Singapore
Referees: Atanu Banerjee (IND), Arnolfo Bermeo (PHI), Ng Cheng Hou (MAS)

3 February

Singapore Slingers	45–74	SM BritAma

The BritAma Arena, North Jakarta
Referees: Andy Cheung (HKG), Teerapong Yodsint (THA), Tan Chin Siong (MAS)

7 February

SM BritAma	86–76	Singapore Slingers
SM win series 2–1

Singapore Indoor Stadium, Singapore
Referees: Amarjot Singh Mavi (IND), Ferdinand Pascual (PHI), Teerapong Yodsint (THA)

== Finals ==
12 February

SM BritAma	68–78	Philippine Patriots

Ynares Sports Arena, Pasig
Referees: Lau Cheuk Fai (HKG), Ho Kok Yew (MAS), Wong Hwee Liak (SIN)

17 February

SM BritAma	53–72	Philippine Patriots

Filoil Flying V Arena, San Juan
Referees: Andy Cheung (HKG), Richard Sim (SIN), Teerapong Yodsint (THA)

21 February

Philippine Patriots	75–67	SM BritAma
Patriots win series 3–0

The BritAma Arena, North Jakarta
Referees: Andy Cheung (HKG), Goh Poh Seng (SIN), Tee Yen Sin (MAS)

== Awards ==
2009–10 ABL Champions
Philippine Patriots
1st title

== Statistics ==
=== Season leaders ===
Last update: end of round 11

Category	Player	Team	Stat
Points per game	Reggie Larry	Brunei Barracudas	21.0
Rebounds per game	Nakiea Miller	SM BritAma	15.3
Assists per game	Reggie Larry	Brunei Barracudas	4.0
Steals per game	Reggie Larry	Brunei Barracudas	2.0
Blocks per game	Nakiea Miller	SM BritAma	5.0

=== Season highs ===
Last update: end of round 11

Category	Player	Team	Stat
Points	Alex Hartman	SM BritAma	33
Rebounds	Nakiea Miller	SM BritAma	22
Assists	Jamal Brown	Kuala Lumpur Dragons	10
Steals	Reggie Larry	Brunei Barracudas	6
Blocks	Lonnie Jones; Nakiea Miller	Brunei Barracudas; SM BritAma	7
Field goals made	Reggie Larry; Rudy Lingganay; Michael LeBlanc; Chaz Briggs	Brunei Barracudas; Kuala Lumpur Dragons; Singapore Slingers; Thailand Tigers	11
Three-point field goals made	Alex Hartman	SM BritAma	6
Free throws made	Alex Hartman	SM BritAma	12

== Teams ==
See 2009-10 Asean Basketball League squads.

Preceded by (first)	ABL playoffs 2009–10	Succeeded by 2011
