= 2011 ABL playoffs =

The 2011 ASEAN Basketball League playoffs was the second season of competition since its establishment. A total of four teams competed. The playoffs started after the 2010–11 ABL regular season ended on 15 January 2011 and concluded with the finals.

The Chang Thailand Slammers defeated the defending champions AirAsia Philippine Patriots in the Finals 2 games to none to win their first title.

== Bracket ==
Best-of-3 semifinals
1	Chang Thailand Slammers	2
4	Singapore Slingers	1
2	AirAsia Philippine Patriots	2
3	Westports KL Dragons	0

Best-of-3 finals
1	Chang Thailand Slammers	2
2	AirAsia Philippine Patriots	0

== Semifinals ==
=== Slammers vs. Slingers ===
24 January

Chang Thailand Slammers	81–76	Singapore Slingers

Thai-Japanese Association Gym, Dindeang
Referees: Wing Hung Lee (HKG), Wai Seong Chan (MAS), Jessie Jarabejo (PHI)

1 February

Singapore Slingers	90–76	Chang Thailand Slammers

Singapore Indoor Stadium, Singapore
Referees: Chun Yip Yuen (HKG), Harja Jaladri (INA), Chin Siong Tan (MAS)

6 February

Chang Thailand Slammers	73–62	Singapore Slingers
Slammers win series 2–1

Thai-Japanese Association Gym, Dindeang
Referees: Andy Cheung (HKG), Ferdinand Pascual (PHI), Le Viet Duc (VIE)

The Chang Thailand Slammers held home court in the deciding game 3 and eliminated in the SIngapore Slingers in Dindeang. Jason Dixon led the Slammers in scoring in the win.

=== Patriots vs. Dragons ===
23 January

Air Asia Philippine Patriots	88–83	Westports KL Dragons

PhilSports Arena, Pasig
Referees: Andy Cheung (HKG), Lucky Adhi Nugroho (INA), Poh Seng Goh (SIN)

26 January

Westports KL Dragons	92–95	Air Asia Philippine Patriots
Patriots win series 2–0

MABA Stadium, Kuala Lumpur
Referees: Cheuk Fai Lau (HKG), Hwee Liak Wong (SIN), Sedyo Mukti Wibowo (INA)

The Philippine Patriots defeated the Westports KL Dragons on their home floor to clinch a finals berth. Egay Billones and Benedict Fernandez converted three point shots to give the Patriots enough cushion in the final minutes.

== Finals ==
13 February

Chang Thailand Slammers	66–58	AirAsia Philippine Patriots

Thai-Japanese Association Gym, Dindeang
Referees: Wing Hung Lee (HKG), Siong Chuan Sim (SIN), Dwi Cahyo Kartiko (INA)

19 February

AirAsia Philippine Patriots	68–75	Chang Thailand Slammers
Slammers win series 2–0

PhilSports Arena, Pasig
Referees: Andy Cheung (HKG), Chuen Wing Leong (SIN), Owe Shiong Chan (MAS)

The Chang Thailand Slammers defeated the AirAsia Philippine Patriots, sweeping the finals series in the Philsports Arena in Pasig. Froilan Baguion and Ardy Larong combined for 34 points to lead the Slammers to the title.

== Winners ==
2010–11 ABL Champions
Chang Thailand Slammers
(1st title)

Preceded by 2010	ABL playoffs 2011	Succeeded by 2012
