= 2013 ABL playoffs =

The 2013 ABL playoffs is the postseason of the 2013 ABL season, which began on Saturday, 23 May 2013, and concluded on 12 June 2013 when the San Miguel Beermen were crowned the 2013 ABL finals champions after sweeping the Indonesia Warriors in the 2013 ABL finals. The four teams with the best regular-season record qualified for the playoffs; the team with the higher seed was awarded the home court advantage.

The semifinals were in a best-of-5 format; the team that first won thrice advanced to the next round. The venues alternated between the opposing teams; the higher seed hosting Game 1, 2 and 5 (if necessary), while the lower seed hosted Game 3 and 4 (if necessary).

== Bracket ==
Semifinals
1	San Miguel	3
4	Sports Rev Thailand	1
2	Indonesia	3
3	Westports Malaysia	0

Finals
1	San Miguel	3
2	Indonesia	0

== Semifinals ==
=== Beermen vs. Slammers ===
23 May

San Miguel Beermen	60–62	Sports Rev Thailand Slammers

Ynares Center, Antipolo

25 May

San Miguel Beermen	91–60	Sports Rev Thailand Slammers

PhilSports Arena, Pasig

28 May

Sports Rev Thailand Slammers	62–70	San Miguel Beermen

Nimibutr Stadium, Bangkok

30 May

Sports Rev Thailand Slammers	61–77	San Miguel Beermen
Beermen win series, 3–1

Nimibutr Stadium, Bangkok

=== Warriors vs. Dragons ===
24 May

Indonesia Warriors	72–63	Westports Malaysia Dragons

Mahaka Square, North Jakarta

26 May

Indonesia Warriors	77–65	Westports Malaysia Dragons

Mahaka Square, North Jakarta

29 May

Westports Malaysia Dragons	64–81	Indonesia Warriors
Warriors win series, 3–0

MABA Stadium, Kuala Lumpur

== Finals ==
7 June

Box Scores

San Miguel Beermen	75–70	Indonesia Warriors
Scoring by quarter: 18-23, 20-15, 21-17, 16-15
Pts: Taulava 22; Rebs: Taulava 10; Asts: Williams 6		Pts: Thomas 20; Rebs: Thomas 17; Asts: Daniels 4

Ynares Sports Arena, Pasig

9 June

Box Scores

San Miguel Beermen	66–65	Indonesia Warriors
Scoring by quarter: 14-12, 23-22, 12-17, 17-14
Pts: Williams 17; Rebs: Williams 16; Asts: Banchero 5		Pts: Pringle 21; Rebs: Thomas 13; Asts: Pringle 6

Ynares Sports Arena, Pasig

12 June

Box Scores

Indonesia Warriors	55–70	San Miguel Beermen
Scoring by quarter: 10-14, 17-19, 16-20, 12-17
Pts: Wuysang 21; Rebs: Daniels 19; Asts: Pringle 4		Pts: Taulava 19; Rebs: Avenido 11; Asts: Banchero 4
Beermen win series, 3-0

Mahaka Square, North Jakarta

== Champions ==
Champions

San Miguel Beermen
1st title

Preceded by 2012	ABL playoffs 2013	Succeeded by 2014
