= 2012 ABL playoffs =

The 2012 ABL playoffs is the postseason of the 2012 ABL season. The four teams with the best regular season record qualify for the playoffs; the team with the higher seed is awarded the home court advantage.

The semifinals are in a best-of-3 format; the team that first wins twice advances to the next round. The venues alternate between the opposing teams; the higher seed hosts game 1 and 3 (if necessary), while the lower seed hosts game 2.

== Bracket ==
Best-of-3 semifinals
1	San Miguel Beermen	2
4	Westports Malaysia Dragons	1
2	AirAsia Philippine Patriots	0
3	Indonesia Warriors	2

Best-of-3 finals
1	San Miguel Beermen	1
3	Indonesia Warriors	2

== Semifinals ==
=== Beermen vs. Dragons ===
26 May

San Miguel Beermen	111–104 (OT)	Westports Malaysia Dragons

Olivarez College Gym, Parañaque

2 June

Westports Malaysia Dragons	100–77	San Miguel Beermen

MABA Stadium, Kuala Lumpur

9 June

San Miguel Beermen	90–56	Westports Malaysia Dragons
Beermen win series 2–1

Ynares Sports Arena, Pasig

=== Patriots vs. Warriors ===
27 May

AirAsia Philippine Patriots	63–74	Indonesia Warriors

Ynares Sports Arena, Pasig

3 June

Indonesia Warriors	72–51	AirAsia Philippine Patriots
Warriors win series 2–0

The BritAma Arena, North Jakarta

== Finals ==
16 June

San Miguel Beermen	86–83	Indonesia Warriors

Ynares Sports Arena, Pasig

23 June

Indonesia Warriors	81–61	San Miguel Beermen

The BritAma Arena, North Jakarta

30 June

San Miguel Beermen	76–78	Indonesia Warriors
Warriors win series 2–1

Ynares Sports Arena, Pasig

== Champions ==
Champions
Indonesia Warriors
1st title

Preceded by 2011	ABL playoffs 2012	Succeeded by 2013
