= Avery Scharer =

Filipino-American basketball player

Personal information
- Born: August 24, 1986 (age 40) Seattle, Washington
- Listed height: 6 ft 2 in (1.88 m)
- Listed weight: 190 lb (86 kg)

Career information
- High school: Garfield (Seattle, Washington)
- College: North Shore CC; Green River CC; Shoreline CC (2010–2012)
- NBA draft: 2012: undrafted
- Playing career: 2012–2023
- Position: Point guard / shooting guard

Career history
- 2012: BZD Ikh-Aravtuud Bulls
- 2012–2013: Seattle Mountaineers
- 2014: Seattle Flight
- 2013–2014: Westports Malaysia Dragons
- 2016: OSK Basketball Club
- 2016–2019: Hi-Tech Bangkok City
- 2018: IECO Green Warriors
- 2019–2020: Dunkin' Raptors
- 2022: New Taipei CTBC DEA
- 2022: Dunkin' Raptors
- 2022: Nha Trang Dolphins
- 2023: T-Rex Nakhon Ratchasima

Career highlights
- TBL Champion (2018); TBL Best Point Guard Award (2018); TBL Best Shooting Guard Award (2016, 2017)

Avery Roberto Scharer (born August 24, 1986), is a Filipino-American former professional basketball player.

== Early life ==
Scharer was born in Seattle, and is of half-African American and Filipino descent. His father is an African-American, while his mother is a Filipina, who hails from Bauang, La Union. His parents divorced when he was a child. At age seven, he first learned basketball in the tough community in Central District, Seattle through his uncle, who used to let him play against grown men. This experience made him a better rebounder and a physical defender he is today.

== High school and college career ==
Scharer went on to play four years of varsity basketball for Garfield High School in Seattle. During this time, he helped former University of Washington alum and current NBA player Tony Wroten develop his game. During his high school years, he was not heavily scouted to play college basketball, so he decided to take his basketball talents to North Shore Community College, and played there for a year. He then transferred to Green River Community College through a scholarship offer. However, his stint there did not last long as his grades started to dip and he came back home.

After being out of school for three years and spending a year in jail, he tried out for Shoreline Community College, where his talent was noticed by assistant basketball coach Adam Jose. It was Jose who mentored him and noticed a character chance in him. He went on to play for Shoreline Dolphins, averaging 16 points, 6.5 rebounds, 9.5 assists and 2.5 steals per game, while helping the school finish seventh in the Northwestern Athletic Association of Community Colleges (NWAACC), its best record in 10 years.

== Professional career ==
=== Being undrafted, Mongolia, and Seattle Mountaineers ===
Scharer applied for the 2012 NBA draft but was undrafted. In that same year, he then applied for the NBA D-League Draft along with current PBA player Japeth Aguilar, but was also undrafted. Yet, he did receive phone calls from NBA teams as well as in the overseas, particularly ABL teams, expressing their interest for his services. This made him decide to play professionally in the Philippines as he considered it as a step closer to his NBA dream. Scharer first played professionally in Mongolia, playing for the Aravtuud Bulls of the Mongolian National Basketball League. He then played for the Seattle Mountaineers in the ABA, a team mostly made up of basketball players from the Seattle area.

=== Westports Malaysia Dragons ===
In his second overseas stint, Scharer saw action in the Malaysia National Basketball League, suiting up for the Kuala Lumpur Dragons (now Westports Malaysia Dragons) and made an outstanding impression, entertaining the crowds with his crossover moves and court vision. He had an impressive MNBL campaign after averaging an impressive 19.5 points, 6.4 rebounds and 7.2 assists per game. He was rewarded a spot to play for the Dragons in the ASEAN Basketball League after another Filipino-American, Rashawn McCarthy, left the team to join the PBA draft.

On August 8, 2014, he made his much-anticipated debut for the Dragons in the ABL with a three pointer in the dying seconds to tie the game against Saigon Heat in regulation, which they eventually won. During the league's regular season, he posted averages of 15.1 points, 6 rebounds and 6.53 assist per game, while leading the league in assists (6.5) and steals (2.6) per game. He also helped the Dragons reach the finals to face the Hi-Tech Bangkok City, but was swept 0–2.

During his stint with the Dragons, he became teammates with current PBA players and fellow Fil-foreigners Moala Tautuaa and Justin Melton.

=== PBA D-League ===
On November 23, 2015, it was announced by Philippine Basketball Association commissioner Chito Narvasa that Scharer was one of the 215 aspirants for the 2015 PBA D-League Draft, which was to take place on December 1, 2015.

On December 1, 2015, he was drafted fifth overall by the Wang's Basketball Couriers in the PBA D-League rookie draft held at PBA Café in Metrowalk, Pasig. However, due to some undisclosed reasons, Scharer never played for the team.

=== Thailand ===
On May 2, 2016, it was reported that Scharer would sign with the OSK Basketball Club of the Thailand Basketball League.

On July 1, 2023, Scharer signed with T-Rex Nakhon Ratchasima of the Thailand Basketball League.

=== Taiwan ===
On March 17, 2022, Scharer signed with New Taipei CTBC DEA of the T1 League.

== Player profile ==
Scharer is a point guard who can score, dish out assists, collar rebounds, and defend all at the same time at any given night. He is also notable for his sick crossover moves, court vision and high basketball IQ.

== Personal life ==
Scharer became a father when he was 20 years old, and had to stop schooling and work for three years to support his son. During this time, he was affiliated with the Black Gangsters Disciples, a Seattle-based gang whose method of operation includes drug trafficking and other crimes.

In July 2009, he was arrested for conspiring to distribute BZP (a synthetic substance similar to ecstasy) with another gang member Dimitrius Tinsley. Both men pleaded guilty to drug charges related to the sale of BZP. On January 15, 2010, he was given an 18-month prison sentence by the US District Court, while Tinsley was given a six-year sentence.

During his time in prison, he dedicated himself to getting in shape and playing basketball. He then became a Christian while in jail.
