= 2014 ABL playoffs =

The 2014 ABL playoffs is the postseason of the 2014 ABL season. The regular season began on 16 July 2014 and ended 26 October 2014. The playoffs began in November 2014, with the top four teams (out of six).

All playoffs series are in a best-of-three format.

== Bracket ==
Semifinals
1	Malaysia	2
4	Saigon	0
2	Bangkok City	2
3	Singapore	0

Finals
1	Malaysia	0
2	Bangkok City	2

All times in UTC+8.

== Semifinals ==
=== Malaysia vs. Saigon ===
29 October
20:00

Westports Malaysia Dragons	108–90	Saigon Heat

MABA Stadium, Kuala Lumpur

2 November
17:00

Saigon Heat	92–102	Westports Malaysia Dragons
Malaysia wins series 2–0

CIS Arena, Saigon

=== Bangkok vs. Singapore ===
29 October
15:00

Hi-Tech Bangkok City	90–76	Singapore Slingers

Thai Japanese Stadium, Bangkok

31 October
20:00

Singapore Slingers	73–76	Hi-Tech Bangkok City
Bangkok wins series 2–0

OCBC Arena, Singapore

== Finals ==
8 November
15:00

Westports Malaysia Dragons	77–93	Hi-Tech Bangkok City

MABA Stadium, Kuala Lumpur

11 November
20:00

Hi-Tech Bangkok City	73–67	Westports Malaysia Dragons
Bangkok wins series 2–0

Thai Japanese Stadium, Bangkok

Preceded by 2013	ABL playoffs 2014	Succeeded by 2015
