= J. P. Alcaraz =

Filipino basketball player

JP Alcaraz
Personal information
- Born: Philippines
- Listed height: 5 ft 11 in (1.80 m)
- Listed weight: 106 lb (48 kg)

Career information
- College: Las Piñas College; Letran
- Playing career: 2009–2012
- Position: Point guard

Career history
- 2009–2011: Philippine Patriots
- 2012: Chang Thailand Slammers

Career highlights
- ABL champion (2009–2010); NCAA Philippines champion (2005)

John Paul "J. P." Alcaraz is a Filipino former professional basketball player. He last played for the Slammers in the ASEAN Basketball League (ABL). He first played in the ABL with the Philippine Patriots which won the 2009–10 ABL title. During his collegiate days with the Letran Knights he was a member of their championship team in 2005.

== College career ==
Alcaraz transferred from Las Piñas College to Letran in 2004. He was a contributor as a sophomore back-up point guard to the Letran Knights' title run in Season 81. The following year, they lost to the San Beda Red Lions in the finals.

== Professional career ==
=== Philippine Patriots (2009–2011) ===
In 2009, Alcaraz joined the Philippine Patriots in the inaugural season of the ASEAN Basketball League (ABL). The Patriots won the title that season.

Alcaraz returned for another season with the Patriots. That season, the 2010–11 season, they lost to the Thailand Slammers in the finals.

=== Chang Thailand Slammers (2012) ===
In 2012, Alcaraz joined the Chang Thailand Slammers halfway during the 2012 season.

After his ABL stints, Alcaraz played in barangay leagues and regional tournaments in Cebu.

== Personal life ==
Alcaraz's brother, Bembem, is a basketball coach who was an assistant coach for Letran and became the head coach of the Cebu Institute of Technology – University Wildcats.
