= Benedict Fernandez =

Filipino basketball player

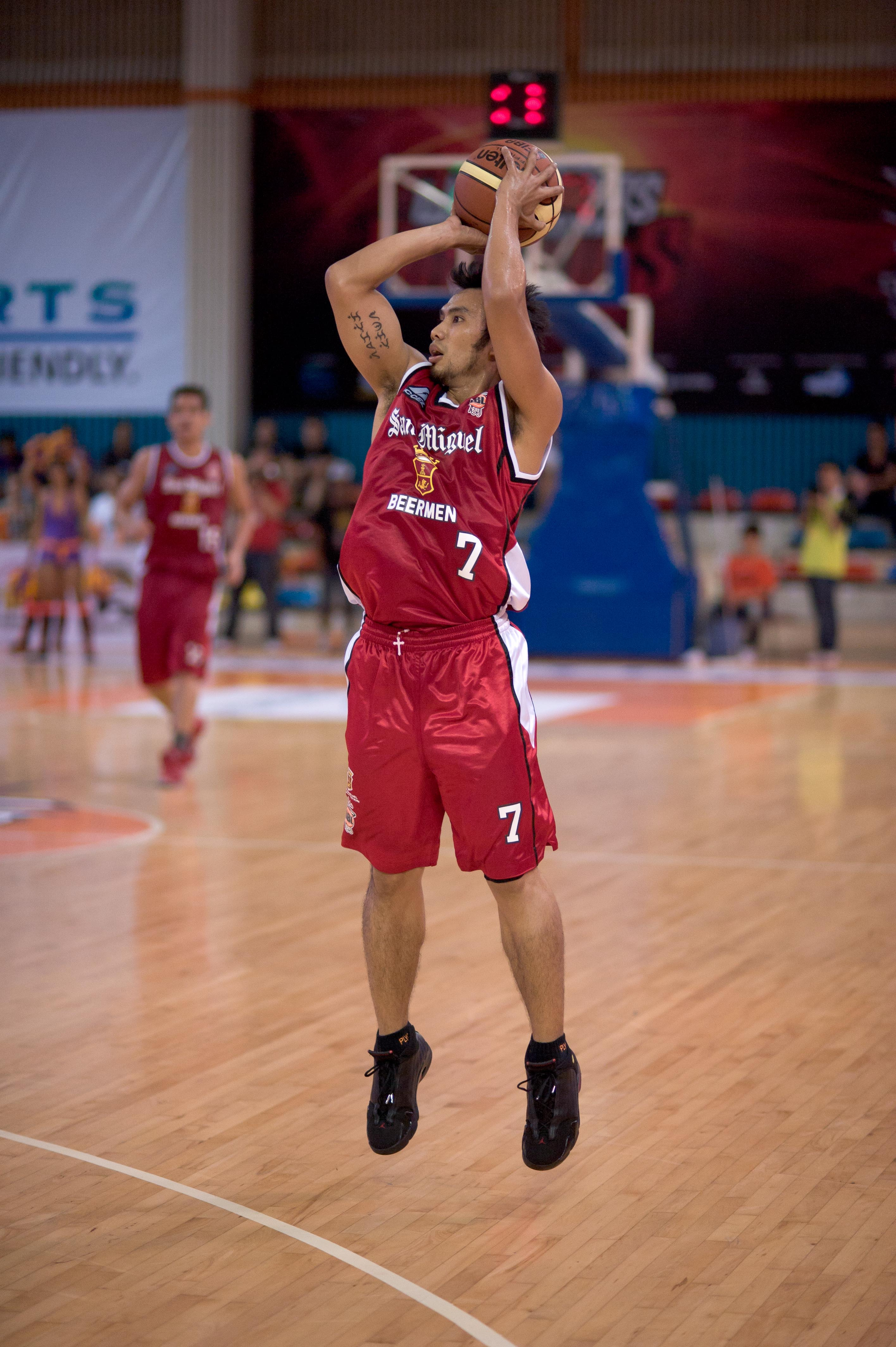
- Benedict Fernandez in 2012

Personal information
- Born: December 13, 1984 (age 41) Baguio, Philippines
- Listed height: 6 ft 0 in (1.83 m)
- Listed weight: 183 lb (83 kg)

Career information
- High school: Saint Louis University Laboratory High School (Baguio)
- College: FEU
- PBA draft: 2009: 2nd round11th overall
- Drafted by: Barako Bull Energy Boosters
- Playing career: 2009–2012
- Position: Point guard
- Number: 7

Career history
- ?: Harbour Centre Batang Pier
- 2009–2010: Barako Bull Energy Boosters
- 2010: Philippine Patriots
- 2011: Cebuana Lhuillier Gems
- 2012: San Miguel Beermen (ABL)

Benedict Tisbe Fernandez III (born December 13, 1984), is a Filipino professional basketball player who last played for San Miguel Beermen in the ASEAN Basketball League.

== Draft ==
Fernandez was drafted by Barako Bull Energy Boosters in 2009, 12th overall.

== Professional career ==
Fernandez played 9 games for the Barako Bull during the 2009–10 PBA Philippine Cup and averaged 3.78 points, 0.67 rebounds and 1 assist.

Fernandez then played for the Cebuana Lhuillier Gems in the PBA D-League, leading the team to a runner-up finish, losing to the NLEX Road Warriors in the finals. He then played for the Philippine Patriots in the ASEAN Basketball League, where he led the team to a team-high scoring effort in the title-clinching loss against the Chang Thailand Slammers in the 2011 ABL finals. Fernandez then suited up for the San Miguel Beermen in the 2012 ABL season.

== Personal life ==
Fernandez owns the Grumpy Joe restaurant, which has five branches.
