= Steve Thomas (basketball) =

American basketball player (born 1981)

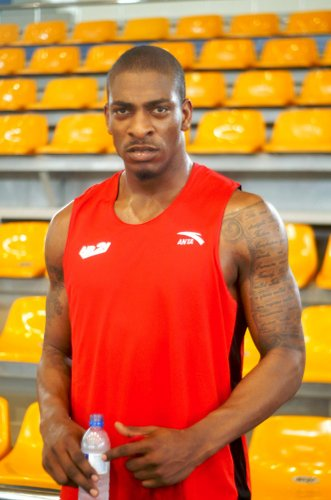
- Thomas in 2008

Personal information
- Born: March 14, 1981 (age 45)
- Listed height: 6 ft 9 in (2.06 m)
- Listed weight: 245 lb (111 kg)

Career information
- High school: Carrollton (Carrollton, Georgia)
- College: Georgia (2000–2003); Middle Tennessee (2004–2005)
- NBA draft: 2005: undrafted
- Playing career: 2005–2020
- Position: Power forward / center

Career history
- 2005: Correcaminos UAT Victoria
- 2005: Cocolos de San Pedro de Macoris
- 2005–2007: Polpak Świecie
- 2006–2007: Cimberio Aironi Novara
- 2007–2008: SKS Polpharma-Pakmet Starogard Gd.
- 2007–2008: Atlanta Krunk
- 2008: East Kentucky Miners
- 2008: Air21 Express
- 2008–2009: Busan KTF Magic Wings
- 2010–2011: AirAsia Philippine Patriots
- 2012–2013: Indonesia Warriors
- 2014–2016: Hi-Tech Bangkok City
- 2015: GlobalPort Batang Pier
- 2017: Hanoi Buffaloes
- 2019–2020: Macau Wolf Warriors

Career highlights
- ABL Defensive Player of the Year (2012); ABL champion (2012, 2014); All-CBA Second Team (2008); CBA All-Defensive Team (2008)

Steve Thomas (born March 14, 1981) is an American former professional basketball player who graduated from Middle Tennessee State. He was undrafted in the 2005 NBA Draft.

Thomas played for the Atlanta Krunk and East Kentucky Miners of the Continental Basketball Association (CBA) during the 2007–08 season. He was named to the All-CBA Second Team and All-Defensive Team.
