= 2009–10 ABL season =

ASEAN Basketball League
- Season: 2009–10
- Dates: 10 October 2009 – 24 January 2010 (regular season); 31 January 2010 – 21 February 2010 (playoffs)
- Games played: 45 (regular season); 8 (playoffs)
- Teams: 6

Finals
- Champions: (Philippines) Philippine Patriots
- Runners-up: (Indonesia) Satria Muda
- Semifinalists: Singapore Slingers (Malaysia) Kuala Lumpur Dragons

Awards
- MVP: Attaporn Lertmalaiporn
- Best Import: Jason Dixon
- Finals MVP: Warren Ybañez

Records
- Biggest home win: Satria Muda BritAma 97–62 Brunei Barracudas (8 November 2009)
- Biggest away win: Kuala Lumpur Dragons 76–94 Brunei Barracudas (14 October 2009)
- Highest scoring: Brunei Barracudas 89–95 Singapore Slingers (20 January 2010)
- Winning streak: 6 games Philippine Patriots
- Losing streak: 6 games Thailand Tigers

The 2009–10 ASEAN Basketball League season was the first season of competition since its establishment. A total of six teams competed in the league. The regular season began on 10 October 2009 and ended on 24 January 2010, which was followed by a post-season involving the top four teams.

The Philippine Patriots of Philippines had the #1 seed at the conclusion of the regular season.

== Teams ==
Team	City/Area	Arena / Capacity	Founded	Joined	Team Owners	Head coach
Kuala Lumpur Dragons	Kuala Lumpur, Malaysia	MABA Stadium (2,500); Putra Stadium (16,000)	2009	2009	Datuk Wira Dani Daim & Westport and Partners	(Malaysia) Goh Cheng Huat
Philippine Patriots	Metro Manila, Philippines	Filoil Flying V Arena (5,000); Ynares Sports Arena (3,000)	2009	2009	Mikee Romero and Tony Boy Cojuangco	(Philippines) Louie Alas
Satria Muda	Jakarta, Indonesia	The BritAma Arena (4,000)	1994	2009	Erick Thohir and Mahaka Foundation	(Indonesia) Fictor Roring
Singapore Slingers	Singapore	Singapore Indoor Stadium (8,126)	2006	2009	Basketball Enterprises Pte. Ltd.	(Australia) Frank Arsego
Thailand Tigers	Bangkok, Thailand	Nimibutr National Stadium (6,051)	2009	2009	Wim Reijnen/Entertainment Asia and partners	(Thailand) Soontornpong Mawintorn
Brunei Barracudas	Bandar Seri Begawan, Brunei Darussalam	Brunei Indoor Stadium (5,500)	2009	2009	Nadzaty Azma Azeez and Everwide SC	(Philippines) Geraldo Ramos

== Regular season ==
=== Standings ===
Pos	Team	Pld	W	L	PF	PA	PD	PCT	GB	Qualification
1	(Philippines) Philippine Patriots	15	11	4	1106	1023	+83	.733	—	Playoffs
2	Singapore Slingers	15	10	5	1133	1081	+52	.667	1	Playoffs
3	(Indonesia) Satria Muda	15	8	7	1119	1075	+44	.533	3	Playoffs
4	(Malaysia) Kuala Lumpur Dragons	15	7	8	1093	1154	−61	.467	4	Playoffs
5	Brunei Barracudas	15	6	9	1183	1234	−51	.400	5	
6	Thailand Tigers	15	3	12	1111	1178	−67	.200	8	

Source: Unknown
Rules for classification: 1) Points; 2) Goal difference; 3) Number of goals scored;

=== Results ===
Home \ Away	BRU	KLD	PHI	SAT	SGP	THA	BRU	KLD	PHI	SAT	SGP	THA
Brunei Barracudas	—	73–76	95–70	85–81	80–82	91–86	—	80–63			89–95	
Kuala Lumpur Dragons	76–94	—	63–73	57–69	78–71	79–78		—	77–59			88–69
Philippine Patriots	70–56	76–70	—	74–56	70–53	74–61	87–65		—	81–69		77–61
Satria Muda	97–62	91–67	69–76	—	59–61	77–71	98–84	67–70		—	67–58	
Singapore Slingers	87–69	74–86	74–69	91–67	—	62–65		92–74	67–59		—	69–66
Thailand Tigers	77–66	88–71	87–91	75–78	80–92	—	89–94			58–69		—

Legend: Blue = home team win; Red = away team win.

=== Matches ===
==== October ====
10 October 2009	Satria Muda (Indonesia)	69–76	(Philippines) Philippine Patriots	Jakarta
	Scoring by quarter: 17–16, 15–17, 14–23, 23–20
		Boxscore		Arena: The BritAma Arena

11 October 2009	Singapore Slingers	87–69	Brunei Barracudas	Singapore
		Boxscore		Arena: Singapore Indoor Stadium

14 October 2009	Kuala Lumpur Dragons (Malaysia)	76–94	Brunei Barracudas	Kuala Lumpur
		Boxscore		Arena: MABA Stadium

18 October 2009	Thailand Tigers	75–78	(Indonesia) Satria Muda	Bangkok
				Arena: Nimibutr Stadium

18 October 2009	Brunei Barracudas	73–76	(Malaysia) Kuala Lumpur Dragons	Bandar Seri Begawan
		Boxscore		Arena: Brunei Indoor Stadium

18 October 2009	Singapore Slingers	74–69	(Philippines) Philippine Patriots	Singapore
		Boxscore		Arena: Singapore Indoor Stadium

24 October 2009	Brunei Barracudas	80–82	Singapore Slingers	Bandar Seri Begawan
		Boxscore		Arena: Brunei Indoor Stadium

25 October 2009	Satria Muda (Indonesia)	91–67	(Malaysia) Kuala Lumpur Dragons	Jakarta
		Boxscore		Arena: The BritAma Arena

25 October 2009	Philippine Patriots (Philippines)	74–61	Thailand Tigers	Pasig
				Arena: Ynares Sports Arena

31 October 2009	Kuala Lumpur Dragons (Malaysia)	79–78	Thailand Tigers	Kuala Lumpur
		Boxscore		Arena: MABA Stadium

==== November ====
1 November 2009	Singapore Slingers	96–72	(Indonesia) Satria Muda	Singapore
		Boxscore		Arena: Singapore Indoor Stadium

7 November 2009	Philippine Patriots (Philippines)	70–53	Singapore Slingers	San Juan
		Boxscore		Arena: Filoil Flying V Arena

8 November 2009	Satria Muda (Indonesia)	97–62	Brunei Barracudas	Jakarta
		Boxscore		Arena: The BritAma Arena

9 November 2009	Thailand Tigers	88–71	(Malaysia) Kuala Lumpur Dragons	Bangkok
		Boxscore		Arena: Nimibutr Stadium

14 November 2009	Satria Muda (Indonesia)	59–61	Singapore Slingers	Jakarta
		Boxscore		Arena: The BritAma Arena

14 November 2009	Brunei Barracudas	91–86	Thailand Tigers	Bandar Seri Begawan
		Boxscore		Arena: Brunei Indoor Stadium

15 November 2009	Kuala Lumpur Dragons (Malaysia)	63–73	(Philippines) Philippine Patriots	Kuala Lumpur
		Boxscore		Arena: MABA Stadium

21 November 2009	Philippine Patriots (Philippines)	74–56	(Indonesia) Satria Muda	San Juan
		Boxscore		Arena: Filoil Flying V Arena

22 November 2009	Thailand Tigers	77–66	Brunei Barracudas	Bangkok
		Boxscore		Arena: Nimibutr Stadium

22 November 2009	Singapore Slingers	74–86	(Malaysia) Kuala Lumpur Dragons	Singapore
		Boxscore		Arena: Singapore Indoor Stadium

28 November 2009	Satria Muda (Indonesia)	77–71	Thailand Tigers	Jakarta
				Arena: The BritAma Arena

==== December ====
1 December 2009	Philippine Patriots (Philippines)	77–61	Thailand Tigers	Pasig
		Boxscore		Arena: Ynares Sports Arena

5 December 2009	Philippine Patriots (Philippines)	81–69	(Indonesia) Satria Muda	San Juan
				Arena: Filoil Flying V Arena

7 December 2009	Singapore Slingers	62–65	Thailand Tigers	Singapore
		Boxscore		Arena: Singapore Indoor Stadium

9 December 2009	Brunei Barracudas	80–63	(Malaysia) Kuala Lumpur Dragons	Bandar Seri Begawan
		Boxscore		Arena: Brunei Indoor Stadium

12 December 2009	Satria Muda (Indonesia)	67–58	Singapore Slingers	Jakarta
				Arena: The BritAma Arena

13 December 2009	Brunei Barracudas	95–70	(Philippines) Philippine Patriots	Bandar Seri Begawan
		Boxscore		Arena: Brunei Indoor Stadium

13 December 2009	Kuala Lumpur Dragons (Malaysia)	88–69	Thailand Tigers	Kuala Lumpur
		Boxscore		Arena: MABA Stadium

17 December 2009	Singapore Slingers	69–66	Thailand Tigers	Singapore
		Boxscore		Arena: Singapore Indoor Stadium

19 December 2009	Philippine Patriots (Philippines)	76–70	(Malaysia) Kuala Lumpur Dragons	Pasig
				Arena: Ynares Sports Arena

20 December 2009	Thailand Tigers	58–69	(Indonesia) Satria Muda	Bangkok
		Boxscore		Arena: Nimibutr Stadium

21 December 2009	Philippine Patriots (Philippines)	70–56	Brunei Barracudas	Pasig
				Arena: Ynares Sports Arena

==== January ====
4 January 2010	Thailand Tigers	89–94	Brunei Barracudas	Bangkok
		Boxscore		Arena: Nimibutr Stadium

5 January 2010	Kuala Lumpur Dragons (Malaysia)	57–69	(Indonesia) Satria Muda	Kuala Lumpur
		Boxscore		Arena: MABA Stadium

6 January 2010	Singapore Slingers	67–59	(Philippines) Philippine Patriots	Singapore
		Boxscore		Arena: Singapore Indoor Stadium

9 January 2010	Kuala Lumpur Dragons (Malaysia)	77–59	(Philippines) Philippine Patriots	Kuala Lumpur
		Boxscore		Arena: MABA Stadium

10 January 2010	Satria Muda (Indonesia)	98–84	Brunei Barracudas	Jakarta
		Boxscore		Arena: The BritAma Arena

11 January 2010	Singapore Slingers	92–74	(Malaysia) Kuala Lumpur Dragons	Singapore
		Boxscore		Arena: Singapore Indoor Stadium

16 January 2010	Brunei Barracudas	85–81	(Indonesia) Satria Muda	Bandar Seri Begawan
		Boxscore		Arena: Brunei Indoor Stadium

17 January 2010	Thailand Tigers	87–91	(Philippines) Philippine Patriots	Bangkok
		Boxscore		Arena: Nimibutr Stadium

17 January 2010	Kuala Lumpur Dragons (Malaysia)	78–71	Singapore Slingers	Kuala Lumpur
		Boxscore		Arena: MABA Stadium

20 January 2010	Brunei Barracudas	89–95	Singapore Slingers	Bandar Seri Begawan
				Arena: Brunei Indoor Stadium

23 January 2010	Satria Muda (Indonesia)	67–70	(Malaysia) Kuala Lumpur Dragons	Jakarta
		Boxscore		Arena: The BritAma Arena

24 January 2010	Thailand Tigers	80–92	Singapore Slingers	Bangkok
		Boxscore		Arena: Nimibutr Stadium

24 January 2010	Philippine Patriots (Philippines)	87–65	Brunei Barracudas	Pasig
				Arena: Ynares Sports Arena

== Playoffs ==
Semifinals best-of-three series
1	Philippine Patriots	2
4	Kuala Lumpur Dragons	0
2	Singapore Slingers	1
3	Satria Muda	2

Finals best-of-five championship series
1	Philippine Patriots	3
3	Satria Muda	0

=== Semifinals ===
The semifinals is a best-of-three series, with the higher seeded team hosting game 1, and 3 if necessary.

Team 1	Series	Team 2	Game 1	Game 2	Game 3
Philippine Patriots (Philippines)	2–0	(Malaysia) Kuala Lumpur Dragons	77–43	70–65	—
Singapore Slingers	1–2	(Indonesia) Satria Muda	88–67	45–74	76–86

=== Finals ===
The finals is a best-of-five series, with the higher seeded team hosting games 1 and 2, and 5 if necessary.

Semifinal 1 winner	Series	Semifinal 2 winner	Game 1	Game 2	Game 3	Game 4	Game 5
Philippine Patriots (Philippines)	3–0	(Indonesia) Satria Muda	78–68	72–53	75–67	–	–

== Statistics ==
=== Season leaders ===
Last update: End of Round 11

Category	Player	Team	Stat
Points per game	Reggie Larry	Brunei Barracudas	21.0
Rebounds per game	Nakiea Miller	SM BritAma	15.3
Assists per game	Reggie Larry	Brunei Barracudas	4.0
Steals per game	Reggie Larry	Brunei Barracudas	2.0
Blocks per game	Nakiea Miller	SM BritAma	5.0

=== Season highs ===
Last update: End of Round 11

Category	Player	Team	Stat
Points	Alex Hartman	SM BritAma	33
Rebounds	Nakiea Miller	SM BritAma	22
Assists	Jamal Brown	Kuala Lumpur Dragons	10
Steals	Reggie Larry	Brunei Barracudas	6
Blocks	Lonnie Jones; Nakiea Miller	Brunei Barracudas; SM BritAma	7
Field goals made	Reggie Larry; Rudy Lingganay; Michael LeBlanc; Chaz Briggs	Brunei Barracudas; Kuala Lumpur Dragons; Singapore Slingers; Thailand Tigers	11
Three-point field goals made	Alex Hartman	SM BritAma	6
Free throws made	Alex Hartman	SM BritAma	12

== Teams ==
See 2009–2010 ABL team rosters.
