= Chris Charles (basketball) =

American basketball player

Personal information
- Born: February 23, 1981 (age 45) Milwaukee, Wisconsin
- Listed height: 7 ft 0.25 in (2.14 m)
- Listed weight: 220 lb (100 kg)

Career information
- High school: Crispus Attucks (York, Pennsylvania)
- College: Villanova (2001–2006)
- NBA draft: 2006: undrafted
- Playing career: 2006–2020
- Position: Center

Career history
- 2006–2008: KK Novi Sad
- 2010–2011: Al-Jaish SC
- 2013: Thailand Slammers
- 2014–2015: Hi-Tech Bangkok City
- 2015: Blackwater Elite
- 2015–2016: Hi-Tech Bangkok City
- 2016–2017: Saigon Heat
- 2017–2018: Singapore Slingers
- 2018–2019: Mono Vampire
- 2019–2020: Saigon Heat
- 2020: Hi-Tech Bangkok City
- 2020: Chaophraya Thunders

Career highlights
- ABL champion (2014); 2× ABL World Import MVP (2013, 2014); 3× ABL Defensive Player of the Year (2013, 2015–16, 2017–18)

Christien Jermain Charles (born February 23, 1981) is an American former professional basketball player.

== Professional career ==
During the 2013-2014 ASEAN Basketball League season, Charles led Hi-Tech Bangkok City to the championship while winning the Most Valuable Player award.

In December 2014, Charles was signed by the Blackwater Bossing of the Philippine Basketball Association as their import for the PBA Commissioner's Cup. However, a left hamstring injury prevented him from suiting up in the PBA.

In 2016, Charles signed with the Saigon Heat for the 2016-17 ABL season.

In 2018, Charles signed with the Singapore Slingers for the 2017-18 ABL season.

In 2019, Charles was named to the ABL's Top 10 Players of All Time. At that time, Charles was a two-time MVP and three-time Defensive Player of the Year winner.
