= Doni Ristanto =

Indonesian basketball player

Donny Ristanto
Personal information
- Born: July 12, 1977 (age 49) Kediri, Indonesia
- Listed height: 6 ft 7 in (2.01 m)
- Listed weight: 240 lb (109 kg)

Career information
- High school: SMA Kristen Petra (Kediri, Indonesia)
- College: Kadiri University
- Playing career: 2008–2020
- Position: Center

Career history
- 2008-2011: CLS Knights
- 2011-2013: Indonesia Warriors
- 2011, 2013: Satria Muda Pertamina
- 2013-2020: Pacific Caesar

Career highlights
- ABL champion (2012)

Donny Ristanto (born July 12, 1977) is a former professional Indonesian basketball player who played for Pacific Caesar Surabaya. He was one of the oldest active player playing at age 43 in the 2020 IBL season.

== Professional career ==
Donny first team is CLS Knights Surabaya, then he moved to Indonesia Warriors (ABL), he also have played for Satria Muda Jakarta in the pre season tournament, and now he play for Pacific Caesar Surabaya.

Regular Seasons

Year/Seasons	League	Club	GP	RPG	APG	SPG	BPG	PPG
13-14	NBL Indonesia	PCF	32	5.1	1	0.3	0.6	5
14-15	NBL Indonesia	PCF	27	2.4	0.3	0.4	0.3	3.8
2016	IBL Indonesia	PCF	29	1.4	0.1	0.2	0.4	2.2
