= Chuan Chin Wee =

Wee Chuan Chin
Personal information
- Born: May 27, 1984 (age 42) Klang, Selangor, Malaysia
- Listed height: 178 cm (5 ft 10 in)
- Listed weight: 75 kg (165 lb)

Career information
- Playing career: 2003–2021
- Position: Guard

Career history
- WCT
- Westports Malaysia Dragons
- Farmco Touchup
- PDRM Basketball
Medals
Bronze medal – third place	2011 SEABA Championship	Men's Basketball

Wee Chuan Chin (born 27 May 1984) is a Malaysian former national basketball player from Klang, Selangor. A multi-talented athlete, he also competed in track and field at a national schools level before focusing on a professional basketball career that spanned from 2003 to 2021. He represented Malaysia in numerous international competitions, including the FIBA Asia Championship.

== Early Life and Athletic Career ==
Wee was a notable athlete during his school years, competing in both basketball and track and field. He excelled in the Majlis Sukan Sekolah Malaysia (MSSM) championships, a national-level school sports competition. In 2002, he won a gold medal in the 4x100m relay and a silver medal in the long jump with a distance of 7.12m.

== Club career ==
Throughout his professional career, Wee played for several prominent teams in Malaysian basketball. He was a key player for the KL Dragons in the ASEAN Basketball League (ABL). In domestic competitions, he also represented teams such as PDRM Basketball and Farmco Touchup.

== National Team Career ==
A long-time member of the Malaysia men's national basketball team, Wee represented the country in the 2005 FIBA Asia Championship and the 2011 FIBA Asia Championship. At the 2011 tournament, he averaged 3.6 points, 1.1 rebounds, and 0.4 assists per game.

One of his significant achievements was helping the national team secure a bronze medal at the 2011 SEABA Championship. He was also part of the squad for the 2011 Jones Cup.

== Post-playing career ==
After retiring, Wee has remained involved in the sport through coaching and player development. He is associated with the Legacy Basketball Academy.

== Awards and Achievements ==
=== Basketball ===
- SEABA Championship
  - 3rd Place (Bronze): 2011
- Agong's Cup (Malaysian National Championship)
  - Champion: 2008, 2009, 2010, 2011, 2013, 2014
  - Top Scorer: 2017
  - Slam Dunk Contest Champion: 2011

=== Track and Field (MSSM) ===
- 4x100m Relay
  - Gold Medalist: 2002
- Long Jump
  - Silver Medalist: 2002 (7.12m)

== See also ==
- Malaysia men's national basketball team
