= Jerwin Gaco =

Filipino basketball player

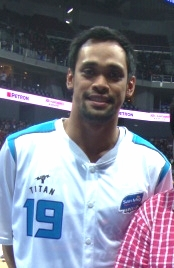

University of Makati
- Title: Assistant coach

Personal information
- Born: January 17, 1981 (age 45) Alabat, Quezon, Philippines
- Listed height: 6 ft 4 in (1.93 m)
- Listed weight: 180 lb (82 kg)

Career information
- High school: San Mateo National High School (San Mateo, Rizal)
- College: PUP (1998–2003); De La Salle (2003–2004)
- PBA draft: 2005: Undrafted
- Playing career: 2009–2022
- Position: Power forward

Career history

Playing
- 2009–2010: Philippine Patriots
- 2010: Barako Energy Coffee Masters
- 2010–2016: B-Meg Llamados / San Mig Coffee Mixers / San Mig Super Coffee Mixers / Purefoods Star Hotshots / Star Hotshots
- 2017: Tanduay Rum Masters
- 2018: Go for Gold Scratchers – College of Saint Benilde
- 2018: Imus Bandera
- 2018–2019: Pasig Pirates
- 2019–2020: Nueva Ecija MiGuard
- 2020–2021: Davao Occidental Tigers
- 2021: JPS Zamboanga City
- 2021–2022: Davao Occidental Tigers

Coaching
- 2026–present: University of Makati (assistant)

Career highlights
- 5× PBA champion (2012 Commissioner's, 2013 Governors' 2013–14 Philippine, 2014 Commissioner's, 2014 Governors'); UAAP champion (2004) (Note: Forfeited due to the scandal that leaked out the following season); ABL champion (2010); PBA D-League Foundation Cup champion (2018); MPBL champion (2021); PSL champion (2022); 7× PBL champion; PBL MVP; VisMin Mythical Five (2021 1st conference)

Jerwin A. Gaco (born January 17, 1981) is a Filipino former professional basketball player and current coach. He was an undrafted player in the 2005 PBA draft. He serves as an assistant coach for University of Makati Hardy Herons.

After playing in semi-professional leagues and in the ASEAN Basketball League (ABL), he was acquired by the Barako Energy Coffee Masters during the 2010 PBA Fiesta Conference before being signed by the B-Meg Derby Ace Llamados for the 2010–11 season. Since then, he has won championships in the PBA, PBA D-League, Maharlika Pilipinas Basketball League (MPBL), and Pilipinas Super League (PSL) .

== Early life ==
Gaco grew up the eldest of four children. Before he had turned 19, he had lost his father to cancer, and his mother to leukemia. With the family now orphaned, he became the breadwinner of that family, with his basketball earnings helping to send his sisters and brother to school.

== College career ==
After playing in Palarong Pambansa, Gaco got offers from different universities. He was given an invitation to try out for the UE Red Warriors, but since he did not know where the campus was, he was not able to go. Instead, he played for the PUP Maroons for three years.

After graduating college, Gaco still had two more playing years left. He spent his last two years with the De La Salle Green Archers in the UAAP. He joined a rookie class that included JVee Casio and Ryan Arana. They had a record of 7–7, allowing them to make the Final Four. In their first Final Four game against the Ateneo Blue Eagles, he was punched by Eagles guard LA Tenorio. He then nudged Tenorio, and La Salle's bench stormed the court. Tenorio was given a one-game suspension, while Gaco was given a technical foul. La Salle went on to win that game in overtime, but lost the next game to Ateneo. The following season, in 2004, the Archers won the championship.

== Semi-professional career ==
After going undrafted in 2005, he played for the Harbour Centre franchise in the Philippine Basketball League, where he honed his skills as an enforcer. He won multiple championships in his time there.

Gaco also saw action for the Laguna Stallions in the semi-professional Liga Pilipinas regional league.

== Professional career ==
=== Philippine Patriots ===
Gaco played for the Philippine Patriots in the ASEAN Basketball League (ABL), winning a championship with them in 2010.

=== Barako Energy Coffee Masters ===
After his time in the ABL, Gaco entered the Philippine Basketball Association (PBA) when Barako acquired him. This happened during the 2010 Fiesta Conference, when he was 29 years old and five years after he had gone undrafted. He had a PBA career-high 14 points in his time there.

=== Magnolia franchise ===
Gaco then signed a contract with the B-Meg Derby Aces Llamados. In his sophomore year, he played in the Rookie-Sophomore Blitz Game, scoring 19 points in that game. His first PBA championship came in the 2012 Commissioner's Cup. Despite being a bench player, he was seen by fans as the "lucky charm" of the team. These fans called themselves the "Gaconatics", after sportscaster Mico Halili gave them that nickname. Team governor Rene Pardo called him "the team's glue guy". He then went on to win a grand slam in 2014 with that franchise. He stayed with the team until 2016, when he was left unsigned by them.

=== Tanduay Rum Masters ===
After attempts to return to the PBA, Gaco signed with the Tanduay Rum Masters for the 2017 PBA D-League Aspirants' Cup, who had a two-game losing streak at the time. He had a double-double of 22 points and 11 rebounds in his winning debut over the Batangas EAC Generals, while his former teammate at Star, Mark Cruz, had 29 points. He became one of the team's leaders as they went on to claim a twice-to-beat advantage. In the quarterfinals, they beat the AMA Titans, with him scoring 16 points. In the semifinals, they lost to the Cignal-San Beda Hawkeyes in three games. Still, he credited his stint with them for helping him gain his confidence back.

=== Go for Gold Scratchers ===
Gaco, as a veteran role player, helped the young Go for Gold team win the 2018 PBA D-League Foundation Cup over the Che Lu Bar and Grill Revellers.

=== Imus Bandera ===
While Gaco was playing for Go for Gold in the D-League, he also played for Imus Bandera, starting from the 2018 Datu Cup. He was originally supposed to play for the Manila Stars, but they cut him before final rosters were submitted.

=== Pasig Pirates ===
Gaco was then placed into the dispersal draft, where he was picked first by the Pasig Pirates.

=== Nueva Ecija MiGuard ===
Gaco then played for the debuting Nueva Ecija MiGuard in the 2019 Lakandula Cup. In his first game for them, he had 17 points, nine rebounds, and five assists. He played seven games for them in the 2020 Lakan Cup before he and the team mutually agreed to part ways.

=== Davao Occidental Tigers ===
As a free agent, Gaco signed with the Davao Occidental Tigers. At 40 years old, he added another championship to his collection when the Tigers defeated the San Juan Knights in the finals of the 2020 MPBL Lakan Cup. Before the following season, he, along with eight other players, were cut from the team.

=== JPS Zamboanga City Valientes ===
In the 1st conference of the VisMin Super Cup, Gaco joined the Zamboanga City JPS. He had a double-double of 24 points and 12 rebounds in a win over the MisOr Brew AuthoriTea. He made that conference's Mythical Team, along with Hesed Gabo, Michael Mabulac, James Castro, and John Wilson.

=== Davao Occidental Tigers / Davao Pilipinas ===
Gaco rejoined the team for the FilBasket Subic Championship. That team made it to the semifinals.

The Tigers then moved to the PSL. He only played one game for them in the first conference. Davao won the conference championship, giving him his 17th championship overall.

He was set to play for them once again as the rebranded Davao Pilipinas were originally picked to represent the Philippines in the ABL. However, those plans fell through and the Zamboanga Valientes became the new Philippine representatives for the ABL.

== Coaching career ==
Gaco became an assistant coach for the University of Makati Herons under coach Mike Pacasio.

== Personal life ==
A single parent, Gaco has two daughters. He also invests in condominium units, and promotes small-time local businesses on his social media accounts.

== PBA career statistics ==
Legend
GP	Games played	MPG	Minutes per game
FG%	Field-goal percentage	3P%	3-point field-goal percentage	FT%	Free-throw percentage
RPG	Rebounds per game	APG	Assists per game	SPG	Steals per game
BPG	Blocks per game	PPG	Points per game	**Bold**	Career high

=== Season-by-season averages ===
Year	Team	GP	MPG	FG%	3P%	FT%	RPG	APG	SPG	BPG	PPG
2009–10	Barako Energy Coffee Masters	15	**13.9**	**.536**	.000	.541	**3.5**	.2	.1	**.1**	**5.3**
2010–11	B-Meg / San Mig Coffee / Purefoods / Star	**40**	12.1	.531	.000	.512	3.2	**.3**	.1	**.1**	4.0
2011–12	B-Meg / San Mig Coffee / Purefoods / Star	14	5.0	.375	.000	.500	2.0	.1	.1	.0	1.3
2012–13	B-Meg / San Mig Coffee / Purefoods / Star	24	5.7	.448	.000	.462	1.5	.2	.1	.0	1.3
2013–14	B-Meg / San Mig Coffee / Purefoods / Star	20	4.4	.524	.000	.500	1.0	.2	**.2**	.0	1.4
2014–15	B-Meg / San Mig Coffee / Purefoods / Star	7	3.6	.500	.000	**.750**	1.1	**.3**	**.2**	.0	1.9
2015–16	B-Meg / San Mig Coffee / Purefoods / Star	4	1.8	.000	.000	.150	.3	.0	.0	.0	.3
Career		124	8.2	.510	.000	.519	2.2	.2	.1	.1	2.7
