= Froilan Baguion =

Filipino basketball player (born 1980)

Personal information
- Born: March 7, 1980 (age 46) Navotas, Philippines
- Listed height: 5 ft 7 in (1.70 m)
- Listed weight: 150 lb (68 kg)

Career information
- College: NU
- PBA draft: 2005: Undrafted
- Playing career: 2006–2015
- Position: Point guard

Career history
- 2006–2008: Welcoat Dragons
- 2008: Coca-Cola Tigers
- 2008–2009: San Miguel Beermen
- 2009–2010: Philippine Patriots
- 2010–2011: Chang Thailand Slammers
- 2012: San Miguel Beermen (ABL)
- 2013: Chang Thailand Slammers
- 2014–2015: Saigon Heat
- 2015: Mono Vampire Basketball Club

Career highlights
- PBA champion (2009 Fiesta); ABL champion (2010)

Froilan C. Baguion (born March 7, 1980) is a Filipino former professional basketball player. He was signed by Welcoat of the Philippine Basketball Association in 2006 after not being drafted in the 2006 PBA draft.

== College career ==
Baguion was a varsity team player for the National University (NU) Bulldogs. During his stay at NU, he is a part of the team that went to their first UAAP Final Four in 2001 (a feat that won't be replicated until 2012), and a championship in the preseason Father Martin Cup in 2003. After the 2004 UAAP season, Baguion signed for the Philippine Basketball Association (PBA) Draft.

== Professional career ==
=== Welcoat Dragons/Rain or Shine Elasto Painters ===
Baguion went undrafted in the 2005 PBA Draft, but was signed from the waiver wires by the Welcoat Dragons. In November 2007, Baguion was selected by the PBA Press Corps as their player of the week. Baguion left the Dragons, by then known as the Rain or Shine Elasto Painters, after the 2007-08 PBA season, after the team qualified for their first semifinals appearance in the 2008 PBA Fiesta Conference, losing the Barangay Ginebra Kings.

=== Coca-Cola Tigers ===
Baguion played for the Coca-Cola Tigers. In one Tigers game at the Mindanao Civic Center in Tubod, Lanao del Norte, Baguion's split free-throws with less than 8.7 seconds left gave enough cushion against the Purefoods Tender Juicy Giants to earn the Tigers a win.

=== San Miguel Beermen ===
Baguion won his first PBA crown with San Miguel Beermen in 2009. The team had American Gabe Freeman as reinforcement. It also included notable PBA stars like Danny Ildefonso and Olsen Racela.

=== Philippine Patriots ===
Baguion won his first ABL crown with the Philippine Patriots when they clinched the 1st championship during the first season of the ASEAN Basketball League. They defeated the Satria Muda BritAma of Indonesia.

=== Chang Thailand Slammers ===
Baguion lead the Chang Thailand Slammers to its first ABL crown when they defeated the AirAsia Philippine Patriots. His play making skills and assists were too much for the Patriots. With the help of American import Jason Dixon, and Thai local superstar Attaporn Leitmalaiporn, they swept the Philippine team.

=== San Miguel Beermen ===
Froilan Baguion joined the San Miguel Beermen during the 3rd season of the Asean Basketball League. He was the starting point guard of the team until Chris Banchero arrived from injury and paper problems during the playoffs. The team reached the finals of the ABL wherein he was the main factor in their victory in game 1 when he shot that crucial 3 points and dished double digit assists. http://www.aseanbasketballleague.com/

=== Sports Rev Thailand Slammers ===
Seeking a point guard and playmaker to influence Thai basketball players, the Thailand Slammers, under new management, signed former star point guard Froilan Baguion. During that season, Baguion led the league in assists, averaging 11 per game. His playmaking abilities gained attention from Thai fans and Filipino supporters of the ABL. In a February game against the Saigon Heat, Baguion recorded 17 assists, setting an ABL record. He achieved multiple double-doubles in Season 4 of the ABL and recorded a triple-double in a game against the Saigon Heat, finishing with 10 points, 11 rebounds, and 11 assists—the first and only triple-double in ABL history.

His coach Joe Bryant were all praises for the Filipino point guard comparing him to NBA assists machines, Steve Nash and Chris Paul. He also believes that Baguion is an NBA material specially if he was younger.

With the help of American import 7'1" Chris Charles and Filipino import Tonino Gonzaga, the slammers reached the ABL playoffs but losing to eventual champions San Miguel Beermen from the Philippines.

=== Saigon Heat ===
Baguion played for Saigon Heat in the ABL, following the Slammers withdrawal from the league before the start of the 2014 season.

=== Mono Vampire Basketball Club ===
In December 2015, Baguion was signed by the Mono Vampire Basketball Club in the middle of the 2015–16 ABL season.

== PBA career statistics ==
Legend
GP	Games played	MPG	Minutes per game
FG%	Field-goal percentage	3P%	3-point field-goal percentage	FT%	Free-throw percentage
RPG	Rebounds per game	APG	Assists per game	SPG	Steals per game
BPG	Blocks per game	PPG	Points per game	**Bold**	Career high

=== Season-by-season averages ===
Year	Team	GP	MPG	FG%	3P%	FT%	RPG	APG	SPG	BPG	PPG
2006–07	Welcoat	**36**	**16.3**	**.426**	.258	.630	**2.0**	**2.9**	**.9**	.0	**3.6**
2007–08	Welcoat	23	13.5	.329	**.283**	**.696**	1.4	2.7	.8	.0	3.4
2008–09	Coca-Cola	18	9.0	.269	.071	.571	1.0	1.8	.6	.0	1.1
2008–09	San Miguel	18	9.0	.269	.071	.571	1.0	1.8	.6	.0	1.1
Career		77	13.8	.376	.242	.649	1.6	2.6	.8	.0	2.9
