= Ardy Larong =

Filipino basketball player

Personal information
- Born: December 14, 1980 (age 45) Butuan, Philippines
- Listed height: 6 ft 2 in (1.88 m)
- Listed weight: 185 lb (84 kg)

Career information
- College: USJ–R
- PBA draft: 2007: 2nd round, 16th overall pick
- Drafted by: Alaska Aces
- Playing career: 2007–2012
- Position: Small forward / shooting guard

Career history
- 2007–2008: Purefoods Tender Juicy Giants
- 2009–2010: Sta. Lucia Realtors
- 2010–2011: Chang Thailand Slammers
- 2011–2012: AirAsia Philippine Patriots

Ardy Larong (born December 14, 1980) is a Filipino former professional basketball player. He last played for the Philippine Patriots in the Asean Basketball League.

He was drafted by Alaska in the second round in the 2007 PBA draft but was left unsigned and the Purefoods Tender Juicy Giants tried him out and signed him. He is known for his defense and hustle. He was signed by the Sta. Lucia Realtors for the 35th PBA season. He played as an import for the Chang Thailand Slammers for the 2010–2011 season.

After the Slammers' successful run, Larong moved back to the Philippines to play for the Misamis Oriental Meteors of the Liga Pilipinas.
