= Jason Dixon =

American basketball player

Personal information
- Born: April 2, 1973 (age 53) Denver, Colorado, U.S.
- Listed height: 6 ft 11 in (2.11 m)
- Listed weight: 242 lb (110 kg)

Career information
- College: Eastern Wyoming (1991–1993); Liberty (1993–1995)
- NBA draft: 1995: undrafted
- Playing career: 1995–2011
- Position: Center

Career history
- 1995–1996: Antirblik
- 1996–1997: Hapoel Galil Elyon
- 1997–1998: Karşıyaka
- 1997–1998: Gimnasia y Esgrima
- 1998–2000: Guangdong Southern Tigers
- 2000: Södertälje
- 2000–2001: Guangdong Southern Tigers
- 2001: Keravnos
- 2001: Trotamundos de Carabobo
- 2001–2002: Keravnos
- 2001–2002: Huntsville Flight
- 2002: Fujian Xunxing
- 2002–2004: Guangdong Southern Tigers
- 2004: Al Sadd
- 2004–2009: Guangdong Southern Tigers
- 2009–2010: Philippine Patriots
- 2010–2011: Thailand Slammers

Career highlights
- No. 15 retired by Guangdong Southern Tigers; 6× CBA champion (2003–2006, 2008); 2× ABL champion (2010–2011); 1× ABL World Import MVP (2009–10)

Jason Dixon (born April 4, 1973) is an American retired professional basketball player.

Dixon played with teams in Turkey, Israel, Argentina, Sweden and Cyprus after his departure from Liberty in 1995. In 1998, he joined the Guangdong Southern Tigers, and was a member of their team which won five CBA league championships between 2004 and 2009. Following the conclusion of their championship 2009 season, Dixon retired from the Chinese Basketball Association (CBA). He would then play for the Philippine Patriots and the Thailand Tigers before retiring from basketball altogether.

On December 23, 2009, the Southern Tigers held a ceremony at Tigers Arena to retire his #15 jersey in honour of his contributions to the team. Dixon is only the second CBA player to have his jersey retired, with the first being Yao Ming. He was also the only international player to have their number retired for any team in the CBA before Tracy McGrady had his number retired by the Qingdao DoubleStar Eagles in 2014.
