= Ike Nwankwo =

Nigerian-American basketball player

Personal information
- Born: December 27, 1973 (age 52) Houston, Texas, U.S.
- Listed height: 6 ft 11 in (2.11 m)
- Listed weight: 257.4 lb (117 kg)

Career information
- High school: Cypress Creek (Houston, Texas)
- College: UCLA (1993–1995); Long Beach State (1996–1997)
- NBA draft: 1997: undrafted
- Playing career: 1998–2010
- Position: Power forward / center

Career history
- 1998: Cocodrilos de Caracas
- 1998: Piratas de Quebradillas
- 1998–1999: Tuborg Pilsener
- 1999: Prokom Trefl Sopot
- 1999: Piratas de Quebradillas
- 1999: Tuborg Pilsener
- 2000: Prokom Trefl Sopot
- 2000: Mets de Guaynabo
- 2000: Vaqueros de Bayamón
- 2000–2001: Sioux Falls Skyforce
- 2001: Marinos de Oriente
- 2001–2002: Dynamo Moscow
- 2002: Cocodrilos de Caracas
- 2003: Huntsville Flight
- 2003: Darüşşafaka
- 2004: Huntsville Flight
- 2004–2005: CAB Madeira
- 2005–2006: Ovarense Basquetebol
- 2006–2007: Queluz
- 2007: Club Ourense Baloncesto
- 2007–2008: Belenenses
- 2008–2009: Club Malvín
- 2009: Rotterdam Challengers
- 2009–2010: Thailand Tigers

Career highlights
- NCAA champion (1995)

Ikenna Nwankwo (born December 27, 1973) is a Nigerian-American former professional basketball player. From Houston, Texas, he played college basketball with the UCLA Bruins, winning a national championship in 1995.

== College career ==
Nwankwo played with the UCLA Bruins, and won a national championship on their 1994–95 team. In his second year as a reserve behind center George Zidek, he played in a career-high 23 games, averaging 2.7 points and 1.6 rebounds. After Zidek graduated, Nwankwo anticipated a larger role in 1995–96; however, freshman Jelani McCoy became the starting center instead. Seeking more playing time, Nwankwo transferred to Long Beach State in January 1996.

== Professional career ==
Nwankwo began his professional career in Venezuela with the Cocodrilos de Caracas. After a very successful stint where he was the league MVP he then moved to Puerto Rico where he was an MVP candidate in Puerto Rico, with Quebradillas Pirates of the Baloncesto Superior Nacional (BSN) from 1998 to 1999. In 1998 Nwankwo also played his first season in Turkey where he would play for the next two seasons. He played with Tuborg where he led the league in rebounds at 10. 1 per game. He returned to Tuborg the following year until a knee injury cut his season short. He then signed in Poland with Prokom Trefl Sopot. Nwankwo signed with the Miami Heat of the NBA in 2000, the following year he signed with the Houston Rockets. From 2001 to 2003, Nwankwo played for several European clubs including MBC Dynamo Moscow of the Russian Superleague. In 2003 Nwankwo joined the Huntsville Flight (now Albuquerque Thunderbirds) of the National Basketball Development League. 2004 saw Nwankwo return to Turkey, where he played with Darüşşafaka S.K. of the Turkish Basketball League (TBL). Since 2005, Nwankwo has played in the Portuguese Basketball League (LCB) (2005 with CAB Madeira and since 2006 with CA Queluz.

== NBA teams ==
Nwankwo signed to play with an NBA squad every year from 2000 to 2004 except 2003, with the Miami Heat (2000), Houston Rockets (2001), Cleveland Cavaliers (2002) and the Los Angeles Lakers (2004) seasons.

== International career ==
Although born in the United States, Nwankwo has represented the land of his ancestry, Nigeria, in international competition. He played for Nigeria at the FIBA Africa Championship 2003 and 2006 FIBA World Championship.

== Coaching career ==
After his playing career ended, Nwankwo started a basketball academy for kids in Bangkok in 2010, which he later launched in Hong Kong as well.

== Personal ==
His name "Ikenna" means "The Father's Strength" in Igbo

Nwankwo graduated from Harvard Law School in 2025.
