= 2010–11 ABL season =

- League: ASEAN Basketball League
- Sport: Basketball
- Duration: 2 October 2010–15 January 2011
- Number of teams: 6
- Season MVP: Mario Wuysang (Satria Muda)

2011 ABL finals
- Champions: Chang Thailand Slammers
- Runners-up: AirAsia Philippine Patriots

ABL seasons
- ← 2009–10 2012 →

The 2010–11 ASEAN Basketball League season was the second season of competition since its establishment. A total of six teams competed the league. The regular season began on 2 October 2010 and ended on 15 January 2011, which was followed by a post-season involving the top four teams.

The Chang Thailand Slammers had the #1 seed at the conclusion of the regular season.

== Teams ==
Team	City/Area	Arena / Capacity	Founded	Joined	Team Owners	Head coach
Kuala Lumpur Dragons	Kuala Lumpur, Malaysia	MABA Stadium (2,500); Putra Stadium (16,000)	2009	2009	Datuk Wira Dani Daim & Westport and Partners	(Malaysia) Goh Cheng Huat
Philippine Patriots	Metro Manila, Philippines	Filoil Flying V Arena (5,000); Ynares Sports Arena (3,000)	2009	2009	Mikee Romero and Tony Boy Cojuangco	(Philippines) Louie Alas
Satria Muda	Jakarta, Indonesia	The BritAma Arena (4,000)	1994	2009	Erick Thohir and Mahaka Foundation	(Indonesia) Octaviarro Romely Tamtelahitu
Singapore Slingers	Singapore	Singapore Indoor Stadium (8,126)	2006	2009	Basketball Enterprises Pte. Ltd.	(Singapore) Neo Beng Siang
Thailand Slammers	Bangkok, Thailand	Nimibutr National Stadium (6,051)	2010	2010	Pornsak Chinawongwatana, Nipondh Chawalitmontien and partners	(Thailand) Tongkiat Singhasene
Brunei Barracudas	Bandar Seri Begawan, Brunei Darussalam	Brunei Indoor Stadium (5,500)	2009	2009	Nadzaty Azma Azeez and Everwide SC	(Philippines) Geraldo Ramos

== Regular season ==
=== Standings ===
Pos	Team	W	L	PF	PA	PD	Qualification
1	Thailand Slammers	11	4	1075	1043	+32	Playoffs
2	(Philippines) Philippine Patriots	9	6	1084	1181	−97	Playoffs
3	(Malaysia) Kuala Lumpur Dragons	8	7	1201	1124	+77	Playoffs
4	Singapore Slingers	7	8	1183	1154	+29	Playoffs
5	(Indonesia) Satria Muda	6	9	1144	1163	−19	
6	Brunei Barracudas	4	11	1050	1152	−102	

=== Results ===
Home \ Away	PHI	BRU	THA	SAT	SGP	KLD	PHI	BRU	THA	SAT	SGP	KLD
Philippine Patriots	—	71–62	68–69	75–69	62–59	73–71	—				80–73	74–92
Brunei Barracudas	67–72	—	67–70	75–66	74–81	87–73	71–58	—	65–72	70–87		
Thailand Slammers	48–54	76–59	—	69–57	77–66	79–74	83–76		—		66–65	76–74
Satria Muda	82–78	70–87	63–84	—	88–83	72–77	74–77		91–68	—		
Singapore Slingers	85–87	74–70	87–81	94–93	—	74–61		102–61		74–83	—	
Kuala Lumpur Dragons	96–81	87–48	77–57	68–77	81–74	—		95–87		85–72	90–93	—

Legend: Blue = home team win; Red = away team win.

== Playoffs ==
Best-of-3 semifinals
1	Thailand Slammers	2
4	Singapore Slingers	1
2	Philippine Patriots	2
3	Westports KL Dragons	0

Best-of-3 finals
1	Thailand Slammers	2
2	Philippine Patriots	0

=== Semifinals ===
The semi-finals is a best-of-three series, with the higher seeded team hosting game 1, and 3 if necessary.

Team 1	Series	Team 2	Game 1	Game 2	Game 3
Thailand Slammers	2–1	Singapore Slingers	81–76	76–90	73–62
Philippine Patriots (Philippines)	2–0	(Malaysia) Westports KL Dragons	88–83	95–92	—

=== Finals ===
The Finals is a best-of-three series, with the higher seeded team hosting game 1, and 3 if necessary.

Semifinal 1 winner	Series	Semifinal 2 winner	Game 1	Game 2	Game 3
Thailand Slammers	2–0	(Philippines) Philippine Patriots	66–58	75–68	—
