= Allan Salangsang =

Filipino basketball player

Bulacan Kuyas
- Title: Head coach
- League: MPBL

Personal information
- Born: October 15, 1976 (age 50) Pampanga
- Listed height: 6 ft 5 in (1.96 m)
- Listed weight: 200 lb (91 kg)

Career information
- College: Letran
- PBA draft: 2001: 3rd round, 27th overall pick
- Drafted by: Tanduay Rhum Masters
- Playing career: 2004–2012
- Position: Small forward

Career history

Playing
- 2004–2006: Talk 'N Text Phone Pals
- 2006: Barangay Ginebra Kings
- 2006–2007: Coca-Cola Tigers
- 2008–2010: Rain or Shine Elasto Painters
- 2010–2011: Philippine Patriots
- 2011–2012: Indonesia Warriors

Coaching
- 2026–present: Bulacan Kuyas

Allan Salangsang (born October 15, 1976) is a Filipino professional basketball coach and former player who is the head coach for the Bulacan Kuyas of the Maharlika Pilipinas Basketball League (MPBL). He was drafted twenty-seventh overall by Tanduay in the 2001 PBA draft.

== Player profile ==
Salangsang was drafted 27th overall by Tanduay in the 2001 PBA season. He first played for the Talk 'N Text Phone Pals in the 2004-05 season. In 2006, he was acquired by the Barangay Ginebra Kings. Afterwards, he played for the Coca-Cola Tigers for one year. He was then acquired by the Welcoat Dragons in 2008 from free agency. After the 2009–10 PBA season, he was acquired by the Philippine Patriots for the ASEAN Basketball League (2010–11). He last played for Indonesia Warriors. However, he was released since the team folded in 2014. He is currently the HS men's basketball coach of Siena College of Taytay.

== PBA career statistics ==
Legend
GP	Games played	MPG	Minutes per game
FG%	Field-goal percentage	3P%	3-point field-goal percentage	FT%	Free-throw percentage
RPG	Rebounds per game	APG	Assists per game	SPG	Steals per game
BPG	Blocks per game	PPG	Points per game	**Bold**	Career high

=== Season-by-season averages ===
Year	Team	GP	MPG	FG%	3P%	FT%	RPG	APG	SPG	BPG	PPG
2004–05	Talk 'N Text	30	9.7	.341	.327	**.667**	2.1	.4	.2	.1	2.8
2005–06	Talk 'N Text	4	2.3	.000	.000	—	.5	.0	.0	.0	.0
2005–06	Barangay Ginebra	16	**20.3**	.351	.273	.500	**3.9**	**.9**	**.4**	.2	6.2
2006–07	Coca-Cola	19	19.7	**.388**	.286	.500	3.3	.5	.2	.2	**6.4**
2007–08	Welcoat	11	7.0	.381	.308	**.667**	1.4	.7	.2	.0	2.0
2008–09	Rain or Shine	**40**	16.0	.379	**.340**	.607	**3.9**	**.9**	**.4**	**.4**	6.0
2009–10	Rain or Shine	6	4.7	.000	.000	.500	.7	.2	.2	.2	.2
Career		126	13.9	.365	.310	.582	2.9	.6	.3	.2	4.5
