= Philippine Patriots =

- Leagues: ASEAN Basketball League
- Founded: 2009
- Withdrew: 2012
- History: Philippine Patriots (2009–2010); AirAsia Philippine Patriots (2010–2012)
- Arena: Ynares Sports Arena, Pasig (2009–2012); Filoil Flying V Arena, San Juan (2012)
- Team colors: Black, red, blue, white
- President: Mikee Romero; Tony Boy Cojuangco
- Head coach: Glenn Capacio
- Championships: 1 (2009-10)
Home	Away

The Philippine Patriots, known as the AirAsia Philippine Patriots from 2010 to 2012 due to sponsorship reasons with Philippines AirAsia, were a professional basketball team that played in the ASEAN Basketball League. It was the first team from the Philippines to play in the ASEAN Basketball League (ABL) and one of the teams that played in the inaugural season of the ABL. The team was co-owned by Michael "Mikee" Romero and businessman Antonio O. Cojuangco, Jr.

The Patriots played their home games at the Ynares Sports Arena in Pasig. During its first season, some games were held at the Filoil Flying V Arena in San Juan. Both are located in Metro Manila.

The Patriots were the first ABL champions, winning the 2010 ABL playoffs (playing as the Philippine Patriots). Shortly after, the "AirAsia" name was added to the team after Romero and Cojuangco became investors in Philippines AirAsia airline.

On July 30, 2012, Romero purchased the Powerade Tigers Philippine Basketball Association (PBA) franchise to be rechristened as the GlobalPort Batang Pier. Romero opted to focus on his new PBA team and the Patriots did not return for the 2013 ABL season.

== Season-by-season records ==
League	Season	Regular season					Playoffs	
League	Season	GP	W	L	Pts	Pos	Round	Result
ABL	2009–10	15	11	4	26	1st	Semifinals; Finals	Philippines 2, Kuala Lumpur 0 Philippines 3, Satria Muda 0
ABL	2010–11	15	9	6	18	2nd	Semifinals; Finals	Philippines 2, Kuala Lumpur 0 Thailand 2, Philippines 0
ABL	2012	21	16	5	32	2nd	Semifinals	Indonesia 2, Philippines 0
Total regular season		51	36	15	—	—	3 playoff appearances	
Total playoffs		10	6	4	—	—	2 finals appearances	
Overall total		61	42	19	—	—	1 ABL championship	

== Achievements ==
Year	ABL regular-season position	ABL grand-finals position
2009–10	#1 seed	Champions
2010–11	#2 seed	Runner-up

== Final roster ==
AirAsia Philippine Patriots roster
Players

Pos.	#	POB	Name	Height	Weight	DOB (YYYY–MM–DD)	From
G	3	(Philippines)	Warren Ybañez	5 ft 11 in (1.80 m)	155 lb (70 kg)		PSBA
C	4	(United States)	Nakiea Miller (I)	6 ft 10 in (2.08 m)	238 lb (108 kg)		Iona
G/F	5	(Philippines)	Rob Wainwright	6 ft 5 in (1.96 m)	200 lb (91 kg)		Solano CC
G/F	8	(Philippines)	Jonathan Fernandez	6 ft 3 in (1.91 m)	205 lb (93 kg)		National-U
G/F	9	(Philippines)	Francis Adriano	6 ft 2 in (1.88 m)	185 lb (84 kg)		Far Eastern
G/F	10	(Philippines)	Eder Saldua	6 ft 3 in (1.91 m)			Far Eastern
F	11	(Philippines)	Eddie Laure	6 ft 4 in (1.93 m)	195 lb (88 kg)		Adamson
F/C	17	(Philippines)	Aldrech Ramos	6 ft 5 in (1.96 m)	170 lb (77 kg)		Far Eastern
PG	18	(Philippines)	Marcy Arellano	5 ft 9 in (1.75 m)	175 lb (79 kg)		UE
PG	19	(Philippines)	Al Vergara	5 ft 8 in (1.73 m)	165 lb (75 kg)		Saint Francis of Assisi
G/F	23	(United States)	Anthony Johnson (I)	6 ft 6 in (1.98 m)	225 lb (102 kg)		Louisiana
F/C	31	(Philippines)	Erick Rodriguez	6 ft 4 in (1.93 m)	198 lb (90 kg)		Letran
F	33	(Philippines)	Bogs Raymundo	6 ft 5 in (1.96 m)	215 lb (98 kg)		UE
SG	38	(Philippines)	Reed Juntilla	6 ft 2 in (1.88 m)	180 lb (82 kg)		Visayas
G/F	45	(Philippines)	Ardy Larong	6 ft 2 in (1.88 m)	185 lb (84 kg)		USJ–R

Coaches
Head coach
- (Philippines) Glenn Capacio (Far Eastern)
Assistant(s)
- (Philippines) Bogs Adornado (UST)
- (Philippines) Ryan Dy (SCSIT)
- (Philippines) Allan Gamboa (UP Diliman)

Legend
- (DP) Unsigned draft pick
- (FA) Free agent
- (S) Suspended
- *(I) = Import
- Injured

== Notable players ==
=== Patriots in the PBA ===
Players that played first for the Patriots before playing in the PBA:

- Nonoy Baclao
- Junjun Cabatu
- Elmer Espiritu
- Jerwin Gaco
- Kelvin Gregorio
- Khasim Mirza

Patriots with prior PBA experience:

- Froilan Baguion
- Egay Billones
- Alex Crisano
- Christian Coronel
- Benedict Fernandez
- Jonathan Fernandez
- Allan Salangsang
- Rob Wainwright
- Warren Ybañez

=== Imports ===
- (United States) Jason Dixon
- (United States) Gabe Freeman
- (United States) Brandon Powell
- (United States) Steve Thomas
- (Jordan) Rasheim Wright
- (United States) Donald Little
- (United States) Nakiea Miller
- (United States) Anthony Johnson
- (United States) Chris Alexander

== See also ==
- Harbour Centre Batang Pier (Philippine Basketball League team)
- GlobalPort Batang Pier (Philippine Basketball Association team)
