= 2014 ABL season =

ASEAN Basketball League
- Season: 2014
- Dates: 16 July 2014 – 26 October 2014 (regular season); 29 October 2014 – 11 November 2014 (playoffs)
- Games played: 60 (regular season); 6 (playoffs)
- Teams: 6

Finals
- Champions: (Thailand) Hi-Tech Bangkok City
- Runners-up: Westports Malaysia Dragons
- Semi-finalists: Singapore Slingers (Vietnam) Saigon Heat

Awards
- Local MVP: Wei Long Wong
- World Import MVP: Chris Charles
- Coach of the Year: Ariel Vanguardia
- Finals MVP: Jerick Canada

Records
- Biggest home win: Westports Malaysia Dragons 100–58 Laskar Dreya South Sumatra (24 October 2014)
- Biggest away win: Laskar Dreya South Sumatra 58–92 Hi-Tech Bangkok City (3 September 2014)
- Highest scoring: Westports Malaysia Dragons 107–104 Hi-Tech Bangkok City (18 October 2014)

The 2014 ASEAN Basketball League Regular Season was the fifth season of competition of the ASEAN Basketball League (ABL). Hi-Tech Bangkok City won its second title in its franchise history after defeating Westports Malaysia Dragons in two games. Anthony Macri, the commissioner of the league for the past two years, resigned on 21 February 2014. The regular season began on 16 July 2014 and concluded on 26 October 2014. Two teams from the previous season, defending champions San Miguel Beermen and Sports Rev Thailand Slammers, did not return for the current season.

== Teams ==
| Team | Location | Arena | Head coach |
|---|---|---|---|
| Hi-Tech Bangkok City | Bangkok | Thai-Japanese Stadium | (Philippines) Jerry Ruiz |
| Laskar Dreya South Sumatra | Sumatra | Senayan Gym Hall 1 | (Indonesia) Tondi Radja Syailendra |
| Indonesia Warriors | North Jakarta | The BritAma Arena | (Indonesia) Cokorda Raka Satya Wibawa |
| Saigon Heat | Ho Chi Minh City | CIS Arena | (United Kingdom) Anthony Garbelotto |
| Singapore Slingers | Singapore | OCBC Arena | (Singapore) Neo Beng Siang |
| Westports Malaysia Dragons | Kuala Lumpur | MABA Stadium | (Philippines) Ariel Vanguardia |

== Standings ==
| Pos | Team | Pld | W | L | PF | PA | PD | Qualification |
|---|---|---|---|---|---|---|---|---|
| 1 | Westports Malaysia Dragons | 20 | 15 | 5 | 1784 | 1562 | +222 | Playoffs |
| 2 | (Thailand) Hi-Tech Bangkok City | 20 | 14 | 6 | 1603 | 1434 | +169 | Playoffs |
| 3 | Singapore Slingers | 20 | 12 | 8 | 1457 | 1408 | +49 | Playoffs |
| 4 | (Vietnam) Saigon Heat | 20 | 9 (Note: Saigon Heat 4–0; Indonesia Warriors 0–4) | 11 | 1517 | 1503 | +14 | Playoffs |
| 5 | Indonesia Warriors | 20 | 9 | 11 | 1385 | 1473 | −88 | |
| 6 | (Indonesia) Laskar Dreya South Sumatra | 20 | 1 | 19 | 1328 | 1694 | −366 | |

== Results ==
| Home \ Away | HBC | INA | LDS | SAI | SGP | WMD | HBC | INA | LDS | SAI | SGP | WMD |
|---|---|---|---|---|---|---|---|---|---|---|---|---|
| Hi-Tech Bangkok City | — | 88–50 | 100–91 | 75–59 | 59–51 | 88–82 | — | 61–53 | 72–65 | 61–57 | 75–96 | 80–88 |
| Indonesia Warriors | 73–70 | — | 100–63 | 61–72 | 65–63 | 88–72 | 61–78 | — | 62–82 | 73–75 | 91–74 | 89–88 |
| Laskar Dreya South Sumatra | 58–92 | 75–76 | — | 79–97 | 61–84 | 64–89 | 60–84 | 54–73 | — | 70–89 | 62–77 | 70–90 |
| Saigon Heat | 74–85 | 72–56 | 70–48 | — | 73–76 | 98–102 | 75–100 | 72–61 | 75–65 | — | 83–65 | 82–85 |
| Singapore Slingers | 78–75 | 80–59 | 62–46 | 77–74 | — | 57–65 | 75–100 | 72–61 | 75–65 | 83–65 | — | 82–85 |
| Westports Malaysia Dragons | 90–93 | 84–66 | 106–84 | 82–72 | 85–59 | — | 107–104 | 97–63 | 100–56 | 103–83 | 101–87 | — |

Legend: Blue = home team win; Red = away team win.

== Statistical leaders ==
| Category | Player | Team | Stat |
|---|---|---|---|
| Points per game | Dior Lowhorn | Singapore Slingers | 26.27 |
| Rebounds per game | Justin Williams | Saigon Heat | 17.65 |
| Assists per game | Avery Scharer | Westports Malaysia Dragons | 6.53 |
| Steals per game | Avery Scharer | Westports Malaysia Dragons | 2.59 |
| Blocks per game | Justin Williams | Saigon Heat | 4.40 |
| Turnovers per game | Justin Howard | Singapore Slingers | 3.88 |
| FT% | Nakorn Jaisanuk | Hi-Tech Bangkok City | 1.000 |
| 3FG% | Russel Low | Singapore Slingers | 1.000 |

== Playoffs ==
The 2014 ABL playoffs began on 29 October 2014.

Semifinals
1 | Malaysia | 2
4 | Saigon | 0
2 | Bangkok City | 2
3 | Singapore | 0

Finals
1 | Malaysia | 0
2 | Bangkok City | 2

All times in UTC+8.

=== Semifinals ===
The semifinals is a best-of-three series, with the higher seeded team hosting game 1, and 3 if necessary.

| Team 1 | Series | Team 2 | Game 1 | Game 2 | Game 3 |
|---|---|---|---|---|---|
| Westports Malaysia Dragons | 2–0 | (Vietnam) Saigon Heat | 108–90 | 102–92 | — |
| Hi-Tech Bangkok City (Thailand) | 2–0 | Singapore Slingers | 90–76 | 76–73 | — |

=== Finals ===
The finals is a best-of-three series, with the higher seeded team hosting game 1, and 3 if necessary.

| Semifinal 1 winner | Series | Semifinal 2 winner | Game 1 | Game 2 | Game 3 |
|---|---|---|---|---|---|
| Westports Malaysia Dragons | 0–2 | (Thailand) Hi-Tech Bangkok City | 77–93 | 67–73 | — |
