= Warren Ybañez =

Filipino basketball player

Personal information
- Born: September 14, 1979 (age 47) Cebu City, Philippines
- Listed height: 5 ft 8 in (1.73 m)
- Listed weight: 155 lb (70 kg)

Career information
- College: Philippine School of Business Administration
- PBA draft: 2004: 3rd round, 27th overall pick
- Drafted by: Coca-Cola Tigers
- Playing career: 2004–2012; 2018–2020
- Position: Point guard

Career history
- 2004–2009: Barako Bull Energy Boosters
- 2009–2012: AirAsia Philippine Patriots
- 2018–2020: Marikina Shoemasters

Career highlights
- PBA champion (2005–06 Fiesta); ABL champion (2010); ABL Finals MVP (2010)

Warren Ybañez (born September 14, 1979) is a Filipino former professional basketball player. He was drafted 27th overall by Coca-Cola in 2004.

He had stints in the Philippine Basketball Association, where he played for the Barako Bull Energy, in the ASEAN Basketball League, playing for the Philippine Patriots. Ybañez was an important piece to the team and a testament to that is him being awarded with the Finals MVP award in 2010.
