= Nakiea Miller =

American basketball player

Nakiea Jovon Miller (born May 15, 1979) is a retired American professional basketball player. He previously played in the ASEAN Basketball League for Satria Muda Pertamina Jakarta, Westports Malaysia Dragons, Philippine Patriots and Pilipinas MX3 Kings, and scored over 1,000 points during his time there. He has also played professionally in Argentina, Belgium, Canada, Chile, Colombia (Patriotas), Dominican Rep., France, Indonesia, Iraq (Al Kahraba), Lebanon (Bejjeh), Malaysia (KL Dragons), Mexico (La Ola Roja del Distrito Federal), Poland, Uruguay (Larre Borges, Goes, Montevideo BC and Maldonado), Venezuela (Toros), Dominican Republic (La Mattica), Philippines (Philippine Patriots) and Kosovo (Besa).

== High school career ==
Miller attended Bunnell High School in Stratford, Connecticut, and was named to the New Haven Register All-Area boys basketball team during the 1996–1997 season.

== College career ==
Miller played basketball at Iona College, where he played center. In 2001 became the all-time blocked shots leader, and is currently the record holder with 249. In 2001 he was named the Metro Atlantic Athletic Conference postseason tournament MVP.

=== College career statistics ===
Cited from Iona College Athletics official site

Year	Games	FG/FGA	FG%	FT/FTA	FT%	Points	Average
1997-98	18	34/50	.680	8/23	.348	76	4.2
1998-99	30	92/171	.538	41/55	.745	225	7.6
1999-00	30	151/291	.519	111/150	.740	413	13.8
2000-01	27	163/244	.668	80/125	.640	408	15.1
Totals	105	440/756	.582	240/353	.680	1,122	10.7

==== Iona Gaels individual career records ====
Rank	Record	Total
1st	Blocked shots	249
31st	Scoring	1,122
6th	Field goal %	.582
