= Indonesia Warriors =

- Leagues: ABL
- Founded: 2011
- Folded: 2014
- History: Indonesia Warriors (2011–2014)
- Arena: The BritAma Arena
- Capacity: 5,000
- Location: Jakarta, Indonesia
- President: Handy Soetedjo
- Head coach: Cokorda Raka Satrya Wibawa
- Championships: 1 (2012)
- Website: Indonesia Warriors
Away

The Indonesia Warriors was an Indonesian professional basketball team that last competed in the ASEAN Basketball League (ABL).

Based in Jakarta, Indonesia, the Warriors replaced Satria Muda BritAma as Indonesia's representative in ABL.

On 19 January 2015, team general manager Rudolph Tulus, the commercial and corporate partnership director of Indonesia Sport Venture, the company that owns and manages the Warriors, announced that management had decided to pull the Warriors out of the 2015–16 ABL season in order to focus on its team (Satria Muda BritAma) in the domestic league. Rudolph Tulus also cited the team's poor results in the 2014 season and its responsibility to its sponsors as contributing factors to the decision. He said that management had not ruled out rejoining the ABL, but he could not be sure when that might be.

== Roster ==
Indonesia Warriors roster
Players
Coaches

Pos.	No.	Nat.	Name	Ht.	Wt.
PG	2	(Indonesia)	Wuysang, Mario	1.80 m (5 ft 11 in)	79 kg (174 lb)
PG	8	(Philippines)	Cañada, Jerick	1.70 m (5 ft 7 in)
SF	9	(United States)	Daniels, Christoper	2.00 m (6 ft 7 in)
SF	12	(Netherlands)	de Ruijter, Swen	1.97 m (6 ft 6 in)
G	16	(Philippines)	Smith, John	1.88 m (6 ft 2 in)
G/F	17	(Indonesia)	Prihantono, Amin	1.87 m (6 ft 2 in)	85 kg (187 lb)
C	24	(Philippines)	Smith, Richard	2.01 m (6 ft 7 in)
C	27	(Indonesia)	Ristanto, Doni	2.00 m (6 ft 7 in)	107 kg (236 lb)
SF	35	(Indonesia)	Sitepu, Christian Ronald	2.00 m (6 ft 7 in)
F/C	55	(United States)	Thomas, Steven	2.04 m (6 ft 8 in)	107 kg (236 lb)
PG	77	(Indonesia)	Tjaswadi, Frans	1.84 m (6 ft 0 in)
PF	91	(Indonesia)	Indrajaya, Agustinus	1.91 m (6 ft 3 in)	74 kg (163 lb)

Head coach

- (Indonesia) Cokorda Raka Satrya Wibawa

Assistant coach(es)

- (Indonesia) Firman Muljono
- (Indonesia) Muchlis Mochamad Sidik

Legend

- (C) Team captain
- (I) Import player
- Injured

- Roster
Updated: 29 December 2013

== Notable players ==
- (Indonesia) Youbel Sondakh
- (Indonesia) Welyanson Situmorang
- (Indonesia) Mario Wuysang
- (Philippines) Stanley Pringle
- (United States) Steve Thomas
- (Philippines) John Smith
- (Philippines) Richard Smith
- (United States) Chris Daniels
- (Philippines) Jerick Canada
- (Philippines) Francis Adriano
- (Philippines) Ricky Ricafuente
- (Philippines) Marlon Legaspi
- (United States) Nakiea Miller
- (Indonesia) Achmad Adiyanto
- (Netherlands) Swen De Ruijter
- (Indonesia) Amin Prihantono
- (Indonesia) Christian Ronaldo Sitepu
- (Indonesia) Ronny Gunawan
- (Indonesia) Cokorda Raka
- (Philippines) J.R. Aquino
- (Indonesia) Ryan Febrian
- (Indonesia) Fattah Arifin
- (Philippines) Allan Salangsang
- (Indonesia) Arki Dikania Wisnu
- (Indonesia) Doni Ristanto
- (Indonesia) Frans Tjaswadi
- (United States) Evan Brock
- (United States) Jonathan Larry Smith
- (Philippines) Joey Mente
- (Philippines) Robert Sanz
- (United States) Marcus Morrison
- (Philippines) Ronald Capati
- (Philippines) Don Camaso
- (Philippines) Mark Magsumbol
- (United States) Alex Hartman
- (Philippines) Rensy Bajar
- (United States) Theo Little

== Coaches ==
- Fictor Roring (2009–10)
- Ocky Tamtelahitu (2010–11)
- (United States) John Todd Purves (2012–13)
- Cokorda Raka Satrya Wibawa (2014)
