= Mario Wuysang =

Indonesian-American basketball player

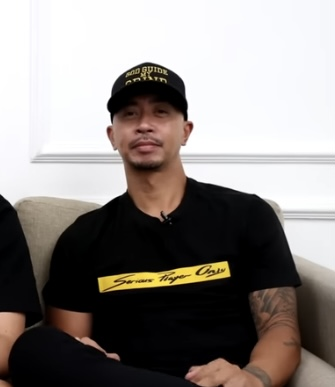
- Mario Wuysang in 2023

Personal information
- Born: May 5, 1979 (age 47) Sidoarjo, Indonesia
- Listed height: 177 cm (5 ft 10 in)
- Listed weight: 165 lb (75 kg)

Career information
- High school: Bloomington North (Bloomington, Indiana)
- College: Northland Pioneer (1997-1998); IPFW (1998–2002)
- Playing career: 2003–2018
- Position: Point guard

Career history
- 2003–2009: Aspac Jakarta
- 2009–2010: Garuda Flexi Bandung
- 2010–2011: Satria Muda BritAma
- 2011–2013: Indonesia Warriors
- 2013–2018: CLS Knights
- 2018: Macau Wolf Warriors

Career highlights
- ABL champion (2012); 3× IBL champion (2003, 2005, 2016); 2x IBL Top Assists (2016, 2017); SEABA Championship Top Assist (2017); IBL All-Star (2017); All-NBL Indonesia First Team (2015); All-NBL Indonesia Second Team (2014); 2× NBL Indonesia assists leader (2014, 2015); FIBA Asian Championship Top Assist (2011); ABL Local Player MVP (2011); 2x IBL All-Defensive Team (2005, 2006); IBL Rookie of the Year (2003)
Medals
Men's basketball
Representing Indonesia
SEABA Championship
Silver medal – second place	2005 Malaysia	Team
Silver medal – second place	2007 Thailand	Team
Silver medal – second place	2009 Indonesia	Team
Silver medal – second place	2011 Indonesia	Team
Silver medal – second place	2017 Manila	Team
SEA Games
Silver medal – second place	2007 Thailand	Team
Bronze medal – third place	2011 Indonesia	Team
Silver medal – second place	2015 Singapore	Team
Silver medal – second place	2017 Kuala Lumpur	Team

Mario Wuysang (born May 5, 1979), nicknamed "Uncle Roe", is an Indonesian-American basketball trainer and former professional player. He attended Indiana University–Purdue University Fort Wayne during his college years and is recognized as Indonesia's best point guard of all time, renowned for his passing and 3-point shooting abilities. Additionally, he has represented the Indonesia national team.

== Early life and career ==
Mario "Roe" Wuysang was born in Sidoarjo on May 5, 1979. Mario spent his childhood in the United States and began playing basketball at 12. Mario is considered one of Indonesia's best point guards. Mario models his game after Michael Jordan and Kobe Bryant, and he possesses exceptional ball control and teamwork.

Roe began actively playing basketball while still in high school and won a state championship at Bloomington North, Indiana. His achievements caught the attention of Irawan Haryono, the president of Aspac Jakarta, who encouraged Mario to return to Indonesia and join Aspac.

== Professional career ==
After winning the 2003 and 2005 IBL titles with Aspac, Mario joined Garuda Bandung in 2009. After just one season with the Garuda, he was recruited by Satria Muda to compete in the ASEAN Basketball League (ABL). Mario won the ABL championship in 2012 with the Indonesia Warriors. He later won the 2016 IBL championship with CLS Knights Surabaya. Mario remained with the Knights until 2018, when he played for the Macau Wolf Warriors in the ABL that year.

== Career statistics ==
=== Regular season ===
Year	Team	League	GP	MPG	FG%	3P%	FT%	RPG	APG	SPG	BPG	PPG
2009–10	Satria Muda	ABL	6	29.3	35%	37%	60%	3.0	1.8	0.8	0.0	8.6
2010–11	Satria Muda	ABL	7	34.9	43%	41%	50%	4.0	4.2	1.4	0.0	11.4
2011–12	Indonesia Warriors	ABL	16	29.2	34%	30%	26%	1.8	3.0	1.4	0.0	10.4
2012–13	Indonesia Warriors	ABL	10	29.2	43%	41%	94%	2.0	2.1	0.9	0.3	13.4
2013–14	CLS Knights	NBL Indonesia	33	-	38%	26%	66%	3.6	4.3	1.6	0.1	12.5
2014–15	CLS Knights	NBL Indonesia	33	-	38%	30%	69%	3.1	6.2	1.6	0.1	9.4
2016	CLS Knights	IBL	29	24.63	37%	36%	70%	3.41	6.86	1.48	0.00	7.69
2017	CLS Knights	IBL	14	25.49	35%	33%	53%	3.29	6.00	0.50	0.07	7.57
2017–18*	CLS Knights	ABL	13	28.7	24%	35%	74%	3.5	3.8	1.1	0.0	11.8

*As of 2/14/2018

=== Playoffs ===
Year	Team	League	GP	MPG	FG%	3P%	FT%	RPG	APG	SPG	BPG	PPG
2016	CLS Knights	IBL	6	31.65	46%	52%	83%	4.67	7.50	1.50	0.50	12.33
2017	CLS Knights	IBL	6	25.50	29%	24%	100%	3.17	3.67	1.33	0.00	9.00

=== International ===
Year	Competition	GP	MPG	FG%	3P%	FT%	RPG	APG	SPG	BPG	PPG
2017	Southeast Asia Basketball Association Championship	6	20.9	40.5%	36.7%	66.7%	2.7	5.3	1.5	0.0	7.8

== National team career ==
According to FIBA data, Wuysang has played in the FIBA Asia Cup three times, in 2005 FIBA Asia Championship in Doha, Qatar, in 2007 FIBA Asia Championship at Tokushima, Japan, and the 2011 FIBA Asia Championship in Wuhan, China. He led teams in assists at the 2011 FIBA Asia Championship and the 2017 SEA Games.
