= Goh Cheng Huat =

Malaysian basketball coach

Personal information
- Born: 2 August 1955 (age 71)
- Position: Head coach

Career history

Coaching
- 2009–2011: Malaysia
- 2009–2011: Westports KL Dragons
- c. 2014: Perak Farmcochem
- 2016–2017: Malaysia
- 2016–2017: Blustar Detergent Dragons

Goh Cheng Huat is a Malaysian former basketball coach who was the head coach of the Malaysia national basketball team from May 2016 to 2017. He also served the same position from 2009-2011.

Goh also served as coach for the Westports KL Dragons from 2009 to 2011, when Filipino coach Ariel Vanguardia replaced him as coach of the basketball team, so he can concentrate on the national team.

Goh was again appointed as the head coach of the KL Dragons, now renamed as Blustar Detergent Dragons, of the PBA D-League in 2016, following the appointment of Westports Malaysia Dragons consultant Ariel Vanguardia as the new mentor of Phoenix Fuel Masters.

In October 2025, Goh was involved in an on-court incident during a Malaysia U-23 Development League match between the Johor Southern Tigers and his team, Parkcity Heat. Near the end of the game on 24 October, Goh allegedly struck referee Mandy Ngieng in the face with a tactical clipboard, resulting in an injury to the official. He reportedly continued shouting at her following the altercation.

The Major Basketball League (MBL), the competition’s organizer, issued an official statement the following day expressing concern and announcing that Goh had been suspended pending a full investigation. The league stated it was “gathering comprehensive reports and statements” before forwarding the case to the Malaysia Basketball Association (MABA) Disciplinary Committee for final determination. The MBL emphasized its commitment to “transparency, fairness and integrity” and stated it takes any threat to the safety of officials “very seriously.”

The incident drew condemnation from the Malaysian basketball community, and based on video evidence, Goh faced a potentially severe penalty if found guilty of deliberately causing injury.
