= Michael LeBlanc =

Canadian sprinter

Personal information
- Born: February 25, 1987 (age 39) Riverview, New Brunswick, Canada

Sport
- Sport: Track and field
- Events: 60m, 100m, 200m
- College team: Syracuse Orange

Achievements and titles
- Personal bests: 60m: 6.61s (Toronto 2012); 100m: 10.17s (Sacramento 2007); 200m: 21.14s (Storrs 2007)

Michael LeBlanc (born February 25, 1987) is a Canadian track athlete specializing in the 100 metres.

LeBlanc specializes in the 100m and 200m for outdoor, and the 60m for indoor. He set his personal best in the 100m in Sacramento, California, in 2007 during the NCAA Division I Championships by running a time of 10.17 with a legal wind measurement of 1.8. On February 19, 2012, LeBlanc set his personal best for the 60m with a time of 6.61, earning him a spot on Team Canada for the 2012 IAAF World Indoor Championships in Istanbul, Turkey.

== Life ==
Michael LeBlanc was born in Riverview, New Brunswick, on February 25, 1987, and graduated from Riverview High School in 2005. Michael's brother Andre works for DreamWorks in visual effects, including in such movies as Shrek 2, Madagascar, and How To Train Your Dragon. LeBlanc only began running in 2003, at the age of 16, yet running impressive times in just his first few competitions and setting numerous provincial records which still stand today. LeBlanc claims to have only started seriously training in September 2004 at the age of 17. His best time as a junior in the 100m was a 10.59 set in Toronto in 2005.

In his collegiate career, LeBlanc ran for Syracuse University where he had a best result of a fourth-place finish at the 2007 NCAA Division I Track and Field Championships.

== Statistics ==
=== Personal bests ===
Event	Best	Location	Date
60 metres	6.61s	Toronto, ON Canada	19 February 2012
100 metres	10.17s	Sacramento, CA United States	6 June 2007
200 metres	21.14s	Storrs, CT United States	6 May 2007

== See also ==
- List of Canadian sports personalities
- List of people from Riverview, New Brunswick
