= Thailand Tigers =

- Leagues: ASEAN Basketball League
- Founded: 2009
- Folded: 2009
- Arena: Nimibutr Stadium
- Location: Bangkok, Thailand
- Team colors: Light blue, Royal blue, and yellow
- President: Wim Reijnen
- Head coach: Mawinporn "Joe" Soonpornthont

The Thailand Tigers was a professional basketball team in Thailand for the international basketball league in Southeast Asia, the ASEAN Basketball League. They played their home games at the Nimibutr Stadium in Bangkok. In 2010–11 season, Thailand Tigers were replaced by the Thailand Cobras.
