= Brunei Barracudas =

- Leagues: ASEAN Basketball League (2009–2012)
- Founded: 2009
- Folded: 2012
- Arena: Brunei Indoor Stadium
- Capacity: 5,500
- Location: Bandar Seri Begawan, Brunei Darussalam
- Team colours: Baby Blue, White
- President: Nadzaty Azma Azeez
- Head coach: Geraldo Ramos

The Brunei Barracudas, also known as Team Barracudas, was a professional basketball team based in Brunei Darussalam which saw action in the ASEAN Basketball League from 2009 to 2012. They played their home games at the Brunei Indoor Stadium in the Bruneian capital of Bandar Seri Begawan. The Barracudas folded in 2012 and did not see action in the following season.

== Final roster ==
Brunei Barracudas roster
Players
Coaches

Pos.	No.	Nat.	Name	Ht.	Wt.	Age
G	35	(United States)	Ramsey Williams	1.78 m (5 ft 10 in)
F/C	24	(United States)	Chris Commons	2.04 m (6 ft 8 in)
F/C		(United States)	Kenny Boyd	2.03 m (6 ft 8 in)
C	1	(United States)	Christopher Garnett	2.11 m (6 ft 11 in)
F	0	(Philippines)	Bryan Faundo	1.98 m (6 ft 6 in)
G	8	(Philippines)	Chester Tolomia	1.91 m (6 ft 3 in)
	6	(Brunei)	Esmond Tan
G	3	(Brunei)	Benjamin Lim	1.60 m (5 ft 3 in)
	21	(Brunei)	Yeh Leong Fong
		(Brunei)	Afif Khalidi (DP)
	19	(Brunei)	Mizi Noor Deen
	18	(Brunei)	Md Jamri Ramlee
G	9	(Brunei)	Aik Hock Lim	1.73 m (5 ft 8 in)
		(Brunei)	Hee Lee Ho (DP)
G	27	(Brunei)	Md Badri Suhaili	1.80 m (5 ft 11 in)
	36	(Brunei)	Chee Choun Lim
F	14	(Brunei)	Zainul Ashyraf	1.96 m (6 ft 5 in)

Head coach

- (Philippines) Geraldo Ramos

Assistant coach(es)

- (United States) Ozell Wells

Legend

- (C) Team captain
- (DP) Development player
- Injured

== Notable players ==
- (Philippines) Francis Adriano
- (Philippines) Leo Avenido
- (Philippines) Don Camaso
- (United States) Mike Pilgrim
- (United States) Lonnie Jones
- (United States) Reggie Larry
- (Australia) Simon Conn
- (Brunei) Md. Jamri Ramlee
- (Brunei) Benjamin N. Sim
- (Brunei) Esmond Tan
- (Philippines) Ramsey Williams
- (Philippines) Chester Tolomia
- (Philippines) Bryan Faundo
- (United States) Chris Commons
- (United States) Chris Garnett
- (Brunei) Md. Badri Suhaili
- (Brunei) Aik Hock Lim
- (Brunei) Mizi Noor Deen
- (Brunei) Afif Khalidi
- (Brunei) Benjamin Lim
- (Philippines) John Cayetano
