= The BritAma Arena =

Indoor sporting arena located in Jakarta, Indonesia

The BritAma Arena Kelapa Gading Sports Mall
- Interactive map of The BritAma Arena; Kelapa Gading Sports Mall
- Location: Kelapa Gading, Jakarta Utara, Indonesia
- Coordinates: 6°08′59″S 106°54′10″E
- Owner: Erick Thohir
- Capacity: 5,000

Tenant
- Satria Muda Pertamina (IBL)

The BritAma Arena (Indonesian: Arena BritAma), also known as Kelapa Gading Sports Mall or Mahaka Square, is an indoor sporting arena located in the affluent Kelapa Gading subdistrict in North Jakarta, Indonesia.

The arena plays host to the basketball games of Indonesia's most successful club basketball team Satria Muda BritAma in the Indonesian Basketball League and ASEAN Basketball League (ABL), and also serves as the venue of some sporting and trade events in the North Jakarta area. The arena hosted the third game of the 2010 ABL finals, and was the venue of the 2011 Southeast Asian basketball tournament, as well as the eSports exhibition event at the 2018 Asian Games.

As Bank Rakyat Indonesia, through its brand "Tabungan BritAma", is the main sponsor of what used to be known as the Satria Muda Mahaka Jakarta team, it also has the naming rights for the venue; therefore "The BritAma Arena".

== See also ==
- List of indoor arenas
- Beach City International Stadium
- Indonesia Arena
- Istora Gelora Bung Karno
- Jawa Pos Arena
- Palembang Sport and Convention Center
