= Kuala Lumpur Dragons =

- Leagues: ASEAN Basketball League
- Founded: 2009
- Dissolved: 2020
- History: List: KL Dragons (2009–2010) Westports KL Dragons (2010–2011) Westports Malaysia Dragons (2012–2019) Blustar Detergent Dragons (2016) Kuala Lumpur Dragons (2019–2020)
- Arena: MABA Stadium
- Capacity: 2,500
- Location: Kuala Lumpur, Malaysia
- Main sponsor: Westports Malaysia Sdn Bhd.
- President: Datuk Wira Dani Daim
- Championships: ABL (2016); MNBL (2010); MNBL Champions Cup (2010)
- Website: www.kldragons.com
Home	Away

The Kuala Lumpur Dragons are a professional basketball team based in Kuala Lumpur, Malaysia that last played in the ASEAN Basketball League. They also played as the Blustar Detergent Dragons in the Philippines' PBA Developmental League in 2016.

== History ==
In their first year of existence, they were known as the KL Dragons before becoming the Westports KL Dragons after a sponsorship deal with Westports. Before the 2012 season, the team became the Westports Malaysia Dragons.

Malaysia has made the ABL semifinals in all of its first four seasons in the league but lost all four times in the semi-finals: the AirAsia Philippine Patriots in its first two semi-finals appearances, the San Miguel Beermen in its third year, and to the Indonesia Warriors in its fourth semi-final appearance. But, in the 2014 season, the Dragons made it to the finals before losing to Hi-Tech Bangkok City in the finals.

In 2011, the Dragons was the ABL representative in the 2011 FIBA Asia Champions Cup held in the Philippines after the champion Chang Thailand Slammers failed to make it because of a suspension by FIBA. KL failed to win a single game in the tourney.

The team won the 2015–16 ASEAN Basketball League season and qualify for the 2016 FIBA Asia Champions Cup. They entered the 2016 PBA D-League Foundation Cup under the name Blustar Detergent Dragons. The Dragons again failed to win a single game in the tourney.

The team changed its name to the Kuala Lumpur Dragons for the 2019–20 ASEAN Basketball League season.

== Achievements ==
=== ASEAN Basketball League ===
Year	ABL Regular Season Position	ABL Grand Finals Position
2009–10	4th place	Semi-finals
2010–11	3rd place	Semi-finals
2012	4th place	Semi-finals
2013	3rd place	Semi-finals
2014	1st place	Runners-up
2015–16	1st place	Champion
2016–17	5th place	Did not qualify
2017–18	8th place	Did not qualify
2018–19	9th place	Did not qualify

=== FIBA Asia Champions Cup ===
Year	FIBA Asia Champions Cup Position
2011	9th place
2016	10th place

== Season by season ==
Season	ASEAN Basketball League						FIBA Asia Championships Cup			
Season	Regular season	Played	Wins	Losses	Win %	Postseason	Final position	Wins	Losses	Win %
2009–10	4th	15	7	8	.280	Lost in semi-finals to Philippine Patriots, 0–2 (series)	Did not qualify			
2010–11	3rd	15	8	7	.533	Lost in semi-finals to AirAsia Philippine Patriots, 0–2 (series)	9th	0	4	.000
2012	4th	21	11	10	.524	Lost in semi-finals to San Miguel Beermen, 1–2 (series)	Did not qualify			
2013	3rd	22	12	10	.545	Lost in Semi-finals to Indonesia Warriors, 0-3(series)	Did not qualify			
2014	1st	20	15	5	.750	Runner-up against Hi-Tech Bangkok City, 0–2 (series)	Did not qualify			
2015–16	1st	20	16	4	.800	Champion against Singapore Slingers, 3–2 (series)	10th	0	4	.000
2016–17	5th	20	7	13	.350	Did not qualify	Did not qualify			
2017–18	8th	20	5	15	.250	Did not qualify	Did not qualify			
2018–19	9th	26	8	18	.308	Did not qualify	Did not qualify			

== Team officials ==
Team owners:

- (Malaysia) Datuk Wira Dani Daim
- (Malaysia) Datuk Robin Tan Yeong Ching
- (Malaysia) Datuk Ruben Gnanalingam

Team President:

- (Malaysia) Datuk Wira Dani Daim

Team Commentator

- (Malaysia) Ben Ibrahim (Foxsports)

== Roster ==
Kuala Lumpur Dragons roster
Players
Coaches

Pos.	No.	Nat.	Name	Ht.	Wt.
F	0	(Malaysia)	Kuek, Tian Yuan	2.03 m (6 ft 8 in)	93 kg (205 lb)
G	2	(Malaysia)	Teoh, Yi Kang	1.82 m (6 ft 0 in)	68 kg (150 lb)
G	5	(United States)	Bell, Amir (WI)	1.95 m (6 ft 5 in)	90 kg (198 lb)
G	6	(Malaysia)	Sim, Benjamin	1.87 m (6 ft 2 in)	88 kg (194 lb)
G	7	(Malaysia)	Tem, Nicholas Zhen Jie	1.83 m (6 ft 0 in)	78 kg (172 lb)
F	9	(Malaysia)	Tan, Wei Long	1.98 m (6 ft 6 in)	85 kg (187 lb)
G	12	(Malaysia)	Wong, John Khai Chiek	1.86 m (6 ft 1 in)	80 kg (176 lb)
F	20	(Malaysia)	Loh, Shee Fai	1.92 m (6 ft 4 in)	95 kg (209 lb)
C	21	(Malaysia)	Lepichev, Simeon	2.08 m (6 ft 10 in)	103 kg (227 lb)
F	23	(Malaysia)	Thea, Zhong Shin	1.96 m (6 ft 5 in)	85 kg (187 lb)
F	27	(Malaysia)	Ting, Chun Hong	1.98 m (6 ft 6 in)	88 kg (194 lb)
C	31	(Chinese Taipei)	Artino, William (WI)	2.13 m (7 ft 0 in)	105 kg (231 lb)
G	34	(United States)	Davis, Cade (WI)	1.98 m (6 ft 6 in)	93 kg (205 lb)
G	44	(Malaysia)	Chin, Cheng Wah	1.91 m (6 ft 3 in)	80 kg (176 lb)

Head coach

Assistant coach(es)

- (Malaysia) Adrian Wong
- (Malaysia) Izran Edika Kamaruddin

Team manager

- (Malaysia) Yakub Hussaini

Legend

- (C) Team captain
- (WI) World import
- (AI) ASEAN heritage import
- Injured

- Roster
Updated: 15 October 2020

== Notable players ==
To appear in this section a player must have either:

- Set a club record or won an individual award as a professional player.
- Played at least one official international match for his senior national team at any time.

=== Imports ===
- (United States) (Chinese Taipei) Will Artino
- (United States) Calvin Godfrey - MVP
- (United States) Reggie Johnson - MVP
- (United States) Keefe Grimes - 6TH MAN OF THE YEAR
- (United States) Brian Williams - MVP
- (Republic of Ireland) Jason Killeen
- (United States) Kiwi Gardner
- (United States) (Philippines) Jason Brickman
- (United States) (Philippines) Joshua Munzon
- (Tonga) (Philippines) Moala Tautuaa
- (Australia) Shaun Bruce
- (Canada) (Philippines) Matthew Wright

=== Malaysians ===
- (Malaysia) Cheng Wah Chin
- (Malaysia) Zhi Shin Chin
- (Malaysia) Wei Hong Choo
- (Malaysia) Batumalai Guganeswaran
- (Malaysia) Yee Tong Heng
- (Malaysia) Tian Yuan Kuek
- (Malaysia) Satyaseelan Kuppusamy
- (Malaysia) Kwaan Yoong Jing
- (Malaysia) Shee Fai Loh
- (Malaysia) Chee Kheun Ma
- (Malaysia) Lok San Mak
- (Malaysia) Ban Sin Ooi
- (Malaysia) Ng Sing Tee
- (Malaysia) Kok Hou Teo
- (Malaysia) Chun Hong Ting
- (Malaysia) Wen Keong Tong
- (Malaysia) Chuan Chin Wee
- (Malaysia) Chee Li Wei
- (Malaysia) Yi Hou Wong
- (Malaysia) Wee Seng Wong
- (Malaysia) Ivan Yeo

== Coaches ==
- (Malaysia) Goh Cheng Huat (2009–11; 2016)
- (Philippines) Ariel Vanguardia (2011–16)
- (United States) Chris Thomas (2016–2018)
- (Australia) Jamie Pearlman (2018–2020)
