= Hi-Tech Basketball Club =

Hi-Tech
- Leagues: Thailand Basketball League (2012–2022); Basketball Thai League (2023–present)
- Founded: 1994
- History: Hi-Tech; Chonburi Hi-Tech; Hitech Assumption Thonburi; Hitech Bangkok City
- Location: Bangkok, Thailand
- Team colours: White, Blue and Red
- Head coach: Chris Daleo

Hi-Tech Basketball Club is a professional basketball team based in Bangkok, Thailand, founded in 1994, currently play in the Basketball Thai League (BTL).

== Trophies and honours ==
=== Domestic ===
- King's Cup
  - Champions (6): 2005, 2006, 2007, 2010, 2012, 2013
- Thailand Open
  - Champions (4): 2008, 2009, 2010, 2011
- Thailand Basketball League
  - Champions (4): 2013, 2018, 2020, 2021
- Basketball Thai League
  - Champions (2): 2023, 2024

=== International ===
- ASEAN Basketball League
  - Champions (2): 2011, 2014
- FIBA Asia Champions Cup
  - 8th Place (1): 2019

== Roster ==
Hi-Tech Basketball Club - 2024 BCL Asia qualifiers roster
Players
Coaches

| Pos. | No. | Nat. | Name | Ht. | Wt. |
|---|---|---|---|---|---|
| C | 0 | (United States) | Allen, Kevin | 2.11 m (6 ft 11 in) |
| G | 2 | (United States) | Elliott, Marcus | 1.91 m (6 ft 3 in) |
| G | 3 | (Thailand) | Lish, Freddie | 1.73 m (5 ft 8 in) |
| F | 5 | (Thailand) | Morgan, Moses | 1.95 m (6 ft 5 in) |
| C | 7 | (Thailand) | Ejesu, Emmanuel | 2.04 m (6 ft 8 in) |
| G | 8 | (Thailand) | Leelaphipatkul, Attapong | 1.85 m (6 ft 1 in) |
| G | 11 | (Thailand) | Booddoung, Manatsawe | 1.77 m (5 ft 10 in) |
| G | 18 | (Thailand) | Jaisanuk, Nakorn | 1.90 m (6 ft 3 in) |
| G | 27 | (Thailand) | Muangboon, Nattakarn | 1.83 m (6 ft 0 in) |
| C | 31 | (Thailand) | Jakrawan, Chanatip | 2.03 m (6 ft 8 in) |
| F | 32 | (Thailand) | Chungyampin, Chatpol | 1.90 m (6 ft 3 in) |
| C | 36 | (Thailand) | Klahan, Patiphan | 2.01 m (6 ft 7 in) | 100 kg (220 lb) |

Head coach

- (Thailand) Nontapob Vivattanapongpetch

Assistant coach(es)

- (Thailand) Pongchaiwat Nivijit

Legend

- (C) Team captain
- (I) Import player
- Injured

- Roster

== ASEAN Basketball League ==
Hi-Tech Bangkok City
- Leagues: ASEAN Basketball League
- History: Chang Thailand Slammers (2010–2012); SportsRev Thailand Slammers (2013); Hi-Tech Bangkok City (2014–2016)
- Arena: Thai Japanese Stadium (6,051); Hi-Tech Gym (2,000)
- Location: Bangkok, Thailand
- Team colours: Orange, Green and Black
- President: Pornsak Chinawongwatana, Nipondh Chawalitmontien
- Head coach: Chris Daleo
| Home | Away |

Logo as the Sports Rev Thailand Slammers.

Hi-Tech joined the Asean Basketball League as the Chang Thailand Slammers in 2010. Won second ASEAN Basketball League championships in 2014 as the Hi-Tech Bangkok City. It plays its games at the Thai-Japanese Stadium.

=== Notable players ===
==== Local players ====
- Piyapong Piroon
- Attaporn Lertmalaiporn
- Kannawat Lertlaokul
- Sukdave Gougar
- Montien Wongsawangtum
- Wattana Suttisin
- Bandit Lakhan
- Nakorn Jaisanuk
- Wutipong Dasom
- Chanon Aaron Seangsuwan

==== Foreign players ====
- (Cameroon) Chris Kuete
- (United States) Jason Dixon
- (Philippines) Ardy Larong
- (Philippines) Abby Santos
- (Philippines) Boyet Bautista
- (Philippines) Ricky Ricafuente
- (Philippines) Chester Tolomia
- (United States) Devon Sullivan
- (United States) Calvin Williams
- (United States) Justin Howard
- (United States) Michael Earl
- (United States) (Rwanda) Darrius Brannon
- (Philippines) Patrick Cabahug
- (United States) Steven Thomas
- (Philippines) Rex Leynes
- (Philippines) Alex Angeles
- (Philippines) JP Alcaraz
- (United States) DeAndre Thomas
- (United States) Chris Garnett
- (United States) Kenneth Walker
- (United States) Chaz Twan Briggs
- (Philippines) Froilan Baguion
- (Philippines) Jonathan Fernandez
- (United States) Chris Charles
- (Philippines) Luis "Tonino" Gonzaga
- (Philippines) Jeric Canada

=== Coaches ===
- (Philippines) Raha Mortel / (Thailand) Tongkiat Singhasene (2010–11)
- (Thailand) Manit Niyomyindee / (United States) Felton Sealey (2012)
- (United States) Joe Bryant (2013)
- (Philippines) Raha Mortel / (Philippines) Jing Ruiz (2014)

=== Miscellaneous ===
In 2011, former team captain Piyapong Piroon donated his team jacket, a number of his jerseys as well as official balls from the ABL in a charity bid to aid victims of the 2011 Thailand floods. Team owner Nipondh Chawalitmontien offered to double that amount.
