= ASEAN Basketball League =

East Asian basketball league

- Organising body: Tune Group
- Founded: 1 October 2009; 17 years ago
- First season: 2009–10
- Folded: 2023
- Country: Brunei; Taiwan; Hong Kong; Indonesia; Macau; Malaysia; Philippines; Singapore; Thailand; Vietnam
- Confederation: FIBA Asia
- Divisions: 1
- Number of teams: 6–10
- Last champions: (Hong Kong) Eastern (2nd title)
- Most championships: (Thailand) Hi-Tech (Hong Kong) Eastern (2 titles each)
- TV partners: Cable TV (Hong Kong); Singtel (Singapore); FPT (Vietnam); ABL (YouTube)

The ASEAN Basketball League (ABL) was an international professional men's basketball league in Southeast Asia, composed of eight teams from Southeast Asia (Indonesia, Malaysia, the Philippines, Singapore, Thailand, and Vietnam), in addition to Hong Kong and Macau. Earlier teams have included Taiwan and Brunei. The league was proposed in Kuala Lumpur, Malaysia and launched its inaugural season on 1 October 2009.

== History ==
=== Formation ===
Basketball officials from 6 ASEAN nations gathered in Metro Manila on 1 September 2009 to officially launch the new league. In its inaugural season, there were six participating teams from different nations in Southeast Asia:

Team	City	Region
Brunei Barracudas	Bandar Seri Begawan	Brunei
Kuala Lumpur Dragons	Kuala Lumpur	Malaysia
Philippine Patriots	San Juan	Philippines
Satria Muda BritAma	Jakarta	Indonesia
Singapore Slingers	Kallang	Singapore
Thailand Tigers	Bangkok	Thailand

=== League expansion ===
On 22 September 2011, the Brunei Barracudas announced that they were bowing out of the third season of ABL after participating for 2 seasons. On 20 October 2011, the Saigon Sports Academy officially announced the participation of Saigon Heat into the third season of ABL, making them the first ever international professional basketball team to represent Vietnam. In the same season, San Miguel Beermen and Bangkok Cobras joined the league along with Saigon Heat. Unfortunately, the Beermen left the ABL after winning the title in 2013. The Cobras also left the league after one season. Further, in 2014, Laskar Dreya South Sumatra (INA) joined and played for a season.

In 2015, Pilipinas MX3 Kings and Mono Vampire joined the league and both teams left in 2016. On 17 July 2016, Kaohsiung Truth from Kaohsiung, Taiwan announced that they will participate in the 2016–17 season. In the same year, the Eastern Basketball Club confirmed its participation in the league. The two teams were the first teams from outside Southeast Asia to compete in the league. The Philippines returned in the league with Alab Pilipinas on 6 August 2016. In September 2017, ABL confirmed four new teams for the 2017–18 season: CLS Knights Indonesia, Formosa Dreamers, the returning Mono Vampire Basketball Club, and the Nanhai Kung Fu after the Kaoshiung Truth disbanded after the seventh season of ABL.

After the 2018 season, the Kung Fu moved to Macau and became the Macau Black Bears, while the league announced the addition of the Zhuhai Wolf Warriors, based in Zhuhai in the Pearl River delta. On 9 September 2019, the league confirmed the entry of the third team from Taiwan, Taipei Fubon Braves situated in Taipei after Formosa Dreamers and disbanded Kaohsiung Truth. Fubon Braves secured the best record in the Super Basketball League and capped it off with the SBL championship after sweeping the Finals series in four games. They are also one of the eight teams to compete in the 2019 FIBA Asia Champions Cup.

=== COVID-19 pandemic and uncertainty ===
The 2019–20 ABL season was halted due to the COVID-19 pandemic in March 2020, placing the status of the ABL in uncertainty. The withdrawal of Mono Vampires, the reports of Taiwanese teams planning to join a domestic league, and the inactivity of the league's social media were among the factors that fuelled speculations that the ABL itself would fold. However, an ABL co-owner dispelled such rumours, stating that they planned to hold the eleventh season in 2021. Plans to resume the league were postponed again with the new starting date for the season initially being in February 2022. The start date was pushed back again a month later to September. The plan did not proceed, but in October the ABL announced its return.

An invitational tournament was held in 2023 and won by Hong Kong Eastern. On November 20, 2023, the league's uncertainty continued as FIBA had dropped support for the ABL. It is "unlikely to play for the foreseeable future", from statement made by the Singapore Slingers.

== Teams ==
Locations of former ABL teams.

Nation	Team(s)	Year(s)	
Nation	Team(s)	From	To
Brunei	Brunei Barracudas	2009	2011
Hong Kong	Hong Kong Eastern	2016	2023
Indonesia	CLS Knights Indonesia	2017	2019
Indonesia	Indonesia Warriors	2012	2014
Indonesia	Laskar Dreya South Sumatra	2014	
Indonesia	Louvre Surabaya	2023	
Indonesia	Satria Muda	2009	2011
Macau	Macau Wolf Warriors	2018	2020
Macau	Macau Black Bears	2017	2023
Malaysia	Kuala Lumpur Dragons	2009	2020
Malaysia	NS Matrix Deers	2023	
Philippines	AirAsia Philippine Patriots	2009	2012
Philippines	Pilipinas MX3 Kings	2015	2016
Philippines	San Miguel Alab Pilipinas	2016	2020
Philippines	San Miguel Beermen	2012	2013
Philippines	Zamboanga Valientes	2023	
Chinese Taipei (Taiwan)	Formosa Dreamers	2017	2020
Chinese Taipei (Taiwan)	Kaohsiung Truth	2016	2017
Chinese Taipei (Taiwan)	Taipei Fubon Braves	2019	2020
Singapore	Singapore Slingers	2009	2023
Thailand	Thailand Tigers	2009	
Thailand	Bangkok Cobras	2012	
Thailand	Bangkok Tigers	2023	
Thailand	Hi-Tech Bangkok City	2010	2016
Thailand	Mono Vampire	2015	2020
Vietnam	Saigon Heat	2012	2023

== Champions ==
The finals is a best-of-5 (2–2–1) series (2010, 2013, 2016–2019) and is a best-of-3 (1–1–1) series (2011, 2012, 2014, 2023)

Season	Finalists			Semi-finalists	
Season	Champions	Result	Runners-up	Semi-finalists	
2009–10	(Philippines) Philippine Patriots^	3–0	(Indonesia) Satria Muda	(Malaysia) Kuala Lumpur Dragons	Singapore Slingers
2010–11	Chang Thailand Slammers^	2–0	(Philippines) Philippine Patriots	Singapore Slingers	(Malaysia) Westports KL Dragons
2012	Indonesia Warriors	2–1	(Philippines) San Miguel Beermen^	(Philippines) Philippine Patriots	Westports Malaysia Dragons
2013	(Philippines) San Miguel Beermen^	3–0	Indonesia Warriors	Thailand Slammers	Westports Malaysia Dragons
2014	(Thailand) Hi-Tech Bangkok City	2–0	Westports Malaysia Dragons^	(Vietnam) Saigon Heat	Singapore Slingers
2015–16	Westports Malaysia Dragons^	3–2	Singapore Slingers	(Thailand) Hi-Tech Bangkok City	(Vietnam) Saigon Heat
2016–17	Hong Kong Eastern Long Lions^	3–1	Singapore Slingers	(Philippines) Alab Pilipinas	(Vietnam) Saigon Heat
2017–18	(Philippines) San Miguel Alab Pilipinas	3–2	(Thailand) Mono Vampire	(China) Chong Son Kung Fu^	Hong Kong Eastern
2018–19	CLS Knights Indonesia	3–2	Singapore Slingers	Hong Kong Eastern	(Thailand) Mono Vampire
2019–20	Cancelled due to the COVID-19 pandemic in Southeast Asia.				
2020–21	Not held due to the COVID-19 pandemic in Southeast Asia.				
2021–22	Not held due to the COVID-19 pandemic in Southeast Asia.				
2023	Hong Kong Eastern	2–1	(Vietnam) Saigon Heat^	(Malaysia) NS Matrix Deers	Singapore Slingers

- ^ finished regular season with the best win–loss record.

=== Championship table by club ===
This medal ranking is based on the club/team representation.

Team	Gold	Silver	Bronze	Total
(Thailand) Hi-Tech Bangkok City	2	0	2	4
Hong Kong Eastern	2	0	2	4
(Malaysia) Kuala Lumpur Dragons	1	1	4	6
(Philippines) AirAsia Philippine Patriots	1	1	1	3
Indonesia Warriors	1	1	0	2
(Philippines) San Miguel Beermen	1	1	0	2
(Philippines) Alab Pilipinas	1	0	1	2
CLS Knights Indonesia	1	0	0	1
Singapore Slingers	0	3	4	7
(Vietnam) Saigon Heat	0	1	3	4
(Thailand) Mono Vampire	0	1	1	2
(Indonesia) Satria Muda BritAma	0	1	0	1
Macau Black Bears	0	0	1	1
(Malaysia) NS Matrix Deers	0	0	1	1
Total	10	10	20	40

- Italic: teams from outside Southeast Asia

== Individual awards ==
ABL presented five individual awards to players: the Local MVP, World Import MVP, ASEAN Heritage MVP, and the Defensive Player of the Year. The Coach of the Year award was given to the league's best head coach of the season.

Prior to the 2015–16 ABL season, there was only one MVP award for imports and was called the Best Import award. It was divided into two for World Imports (for players hailing from outside Southeast Asia and to the ASEAN Heritage Imports (for players from other Southeast Asian countries or players with at least one Southeast Asian parent). Also, the Defensive Player of the Year and Coach of the Year awards were only awarded since the 2012 season.

=== Most Valuable Players ===
==== Locals ====
Season	Player	Nationality	Team
2009–10	Attaporn Lertmalaiporn	Thailand	Thailand Tigers
2010–11	Mario Wuysang	Indonesia	(Indonesia) Satria Muda
2012	Leo Avenido	Philippines	(Philippines) San Miguel Beermen
2013	Asi Taulava	Philippines	(Philippines) San Miguel Beermen
2014	Wei Long Wong	Singapore	Singapore Slingers
2015–16	Wei Long Wong	Singapore	Singapore Slingers
2016–17	Bobby Ray Parks Jr.	Philippines	(Philippines) Alab Pilipinas
2017–18	Bobby Ray Parks Jr.	Philippines	(Philippines) Alab Pilipinas
2018–19	Bobby Ray Parks Jr.	Philippines	(Philippines) Alab Pilipinas

==== World Imports ====
Season	Player	Nationality	Team
2009–10	Jason Dixon	United States	(Philippines) Philippine Patriots
2010–11	Nakiea Miller	United States	(Malaysia) Westports KL Dragons
2012	Anthony Johnson	United States	(Philippines) AirAsia Philippine Patriots
2013	Christien Charles	United States	Sports Rev Thailand Slammers
2014	Christien Charles	United States	(Thailand) Hi-Tech Bangkok City
2015–16	Reggie Johnson	United States	Westports Malaysia Dragons
2016–17	Marcus Elliott	United States	Hong Kong Eastern Long Lions
2017–18	Anthony Tucker	United States	(China) Chong Son Kung Fu
2018–19	Xavier Alexander	United States	Singapore Slingers

==== Heritage Imports ====
Season	Player	Nationality	Team
2015–16	Matthew Wright	Philippines	Westports Malaysia Dragons
2016–17	Tyler Lamb	Thailand	Hong Kong Eastern Long Lions
2017–18	Mikh McKinney	Philippines	(China) Chong Son Kung Fu

==== Finals ====
Season	Player	Nationality	Team
2009–10	Warren Ybañez	Philippines	(Philippines) Philippine Patriots
2010–11	Attaporn Lertmalaiporn	Thailand	Chang Thailand Slammers
2012	Evan Brock	United States	Indonesia Warriors
2013	Chris Banchero	Philippines	(Philippines) San Miguel Beermen
2014	Jerick Cañada	Philippines	(Thailand) Hi-Tech Bangkok City
2015–16	Jason Brickman	Philippines	Westports Malaysia Dragons
2016–17	Marcus Elliott	United States	Hong Kong Eastern Long Lions
2017–18	Bobby Ray Parks Jr.	Philippines	(Philippines) San Miguel Alab Pilipinas
2018–19	Maxie Esho	United States	CLS Knights Indonesia
2023	Tonny Trocha-Morelos	Colombia	Hong Kong Eastern

=== Special awards ===
==== Defensive Player of the Year ====
Season	Player	Nationality	Team
2012	Steven Thomas	United States	Indonesia Warriors
2013	Chris Charles	United States	Sports Rev Thailand Slammers
2014	Justin Williams	United States	(Vietnam) Saigon Heat
2015–16	Chris Charles	United States	(Thailand) Hi-Tech Bangkok City
2016–17	Justin Howard	United States	Singapore Slingers
2017–18	Renaldo Balkman	Puerto Rico	(Philippines) San Miguel Alab Pilipinas
2017–18	Chris Charles	United States	Singapore Slingers
2018–19	John Fields	United States	Singapore Slingers
2023	Chris McLaughlin	Canada	Hong Kong Eastern

==== Coach of the Year ====
Season	Coach	Nationality	Team
2012	Todd Purves	United States	Indonesia Warriors
2013	Leo Austria	Philippines	(Philippines) San Miguel Beermen
2014	Ariel Vanguardia	Philippines	Westports Malaysia Dragons
2015–16	Neo Beng Siang	Singapore	Singapore Slingers
2016–17	Edu Torres	Spain	Hong Kong Eastern Long Lions
2017–18	Charles Dubé-Brais	Canada	(China) Chong Son Kung Fu
2018–19	Dean Murray	United States	(Chinese Taipei) Formosa Dreamers
2023	Željko Pavličević	Croatia	Hong Kong Eastern

== See also ==
- ABL 3x3 International Champions Cup
- East Asia Super League
- West Asia Super League
- FIBA Asia Champions Cup
- AsiaBasket
