= 2007–08 Singapore Slingers season =

- Head coach: (Australia) Gordon McLeod
- Captain: (Australia) Ben Knight
- Arena: Singapore Indoor Stadium

NBL results
- Record: 6–24 (20%)
- Ladder: 12th
- Finals finish: Did not qualify
- Stats at NBL.com.au

Player records
- Points: (United States) Helms 20.9
- Rebounds: (Australia) Knight 9.5
- Assists: (United States) Helms 3.1

Uniforms
Home	Away
- All statistics correct as of 13 February 2008.

The 2007–08 Singapore Slingers season was the 2nd season of the franchise in the National Basketball League (NBL).

The Singapore Slingers were the only Asian team to compete in Australia's National Basketball League (NBL). The Slingers play their home games at the 10,000 seat Singapore Indoor Stadium in Kallang, Singapore. On 17 September 2007, the Singapore Slingers signed their main sponsorship with CLSA Asia-Pacific Markets on a 12-month deal, with an option to extend an additional year.

== Roster ==
=== Free agency ===
==== Re-signed ====
Player	Signed
Ben Knight	5 July
Mike Helms	24 August

==== Additions ====
Player	Signed	Former team
Rod Grizzard	15 August	Atomerőmű SE
Blagoj Janev	3 May	University of New Hampshire
Chris Cameron	3 May	Louisiana-Lafayette

==== Subtractions ====
Player	Reason left	New team
Ben Melmeth	Unrestricted Free Agent	Gold Coast Blaze
Bradley Davidson	Unrestricted Free Agent	Adelaide 36ers
Larry Davidson	Unrestricted Free Agent	Wollongong Hawks
Jeremy Kench	Unrestricted Free Agent	Wollongong Hawks
Eban Hyams	Unrestricted Free Agent	Hapoel Galil Elyon
Aaron Trahair	Unrestricted Free Agent	Perth Wildcats
Pero Vasiljevic	Unrestricted Free Agent	Élan Chalon

Note: Flags indicate national team eligibility at FIBA-sanctioned events. Players may hold other non-FIBA nationalities not displayed.

2007–08 Singapore Slingers roster
Players
Coaches

Pos.	No.	Nat.	Name	Ht.	Wt.
F	1	(United States)	Grizzard, Rod (I)	2.07 m (6 ft 9 in)	90 kg (198 lb)
C	3	(Australia)	Cameron, Chris	2.11 m (6 ft 11 in)	121 kg (267 lb)
G	4	(Australia)	Fitzgerald, John	1.93 m (6 ft 4 in)	91 kg (201 lb)
G	7	(Australia)	McDonald, Shane	1.87 m (6 ft 2 in)	72 kg (159 lb)
G	9	(New Zealand)	Allen, Hayden	1.91 m (6 ft 3 in)	92 kg (203 lb)
G	10	(Singapore)	Koon, Koh Meng (DP)	1.90 m (6 ft 3 in)	86 kg (190 lb)
G	11	(Singapore)	Wong, Michael (DP)	1.86 m (6 ft 1 in)	76 kg (168 lb)
C	12	(Australia)	Donaldson, David	2.09 m (6 ft 10 in)	103 kg (227 lb)
F	15	(Singapore)	Matialakan, Pathman (DP)	1.98 m (6 ft 6 in)	102 kg (225 lb)
G	23	(United States)	Helms, Mike (I)	1.84 m (6 ft 0 in)	94 kg (207 lb)
C	21	(Australia)	Janev, Blagoj	2.07 m (6 ft 9 in)	100 kg (220 lb)
F	30	(Australia)	Matacz, Damian	2.06 m (6 ft 9 in)	105 kg (231 lb)
F	33	(Australia)	Knight, Ben (C)	2.02 m (6 ft 8 in)	106 kg (234 lb)

Head coach

- (Australia) Gordon McLeod

Assistant coach(es)

- (Singapore) Neo Beng Siang

Legend

- (C) Team captain
- (DP) Development player
- (I) Import player
- Injured

- Roster
Updated: 17 October 2007

=== Depth chart ===
Pos.	Starting 5	Bench 1	Bench 2
C	Blagoj Janev	Chris Cameron
PF	Ben Knight	David Donaldson	Damian Matacz
SF	Rod Grizzard	Pathman Matialakan
SG	Mike Helms	John Fitzgerald	Koh Meng Koon
PG	Shane McDonald	Hayden Allen	Michael Wong

*Note: Matt McQuade's Analysis - Singapore.

== Regular season ==
The regular season of the National Basketball League consisted of 30 games. Slinger's will play 15 home games and 15 away games. The Slingers opening match is against the Melbourne Tigers at Singapore's home which is the Singapore Indoor Stadium.

=== Ladder ===
This is the ladder at the end of season, before the finals. The top 8 teams qualified for the finals series.

Pos	2007–08 NBL season											
Pos	Team	Pld	W	L	PCT	Last 5	Streak	Home	Away	PF	PA	PP
1	Sydney Kings	30	27	3	90.00%	5–0	W8	14–1	13–2	3058	2721	112.39%
2	Melbourne Tigers	30	22	8	73.33%	3–2	W2	12–3	10–5	3093	2904	106.51%
3	Brisbane Bullets	30	20	10	66.67%	3–2	W1	13–2	7–8	3407	3145	108.33%
4	Perth Wildcats	30	18	12	60.00%	3–2	W3	12–3	6–9	2908	2731	106.48%
5	Townsville Crocodiles	30	17	13	56.67%	4–1	L1	12–3	5–10	2961	2927	101.16%
6	Cairns Taipans^{1}	30	16	14	53.33%	3–2	W2	10–5	6–9	2927	2849	102.74%
7	New Zealand Breakers^{1}	30	16	14	53.33%	3–2	L2	11–4	6–9	3026	3059	98.92%
8	Gold Coast Blaze	30	15	15	50.00%	1–4	L3	10–5	5–10	2865	2892	99.07%
9	Adelaide 36ers	30	14	16	46.67%	4–1	W2	9–6	5–10	3130	3124	100.19%
10	West Sydney Razorbacks	30	10	20	33.33%	0–5	L6	6–9	4–11	3097	3248	95.35%
11	Wollongong Hawks	30	9	21	30.00%	1–4	L2	7–8	2–13	2928	3128	93.61%
12	Singapore Slingers	30	6	24	20.00%	1–4	L2	5–10	1–14	2829	3207	88.21%
13	South Dragons	30	5	25	16.67%	1–4	L2	4–11	1–14	2904	3198	90.81%

Updated to match(es) played on 16 February 2008. Source: NBL.com.au

The NBL tie-breaker system as outlined in the NBL Rules and Regulations states that in the case of an identical win-loss record, the results in games played between the teams will determine order of seeding.

=== Regular season ===
2007–08 game log
Total: 6–24 (Home: 5–10; Road: 1–14)
September: 0–3 (Home: 0–2; Road: 0–1)

Game	Date	Team	Score	High points	High rebounds	High assists	Location Attendance	Record
1	19 September	Melbourne	L 94–117	Ben Knight (20)	Ben Knight (9)	Shane McDonald (4)	Singapore Indoor Stadium	0–1
2	23 September	@ Perth	L 112–80	Mike Helms (23)	Ben Knight (10)	Mike Helms (4)	Challenge Stadium	0–2
3	26 September	Gold Coast	L 93–99	Mike Helms (27)	Ben Knight (9)	Mike Helms (3)	Singapore Indoor Stadium	0–3

October: 1–5 (Home: 1–3; Road: 0–2)

Game	Date	Team	Score	High points	High rebounds	High assists	Location Attendance	Record
4	2 October	Townsville	W 101–86	Rod Grizzard (32)	Ben Knight (13)	Grizzard, Helms, McDonald (3)	Singapore Indoor Stadium	1–3
5	13 October	@ Gold Coast	L 97–82	Mike Helms (21)	Mike Helms (8)	Shane McDonald (3)	Gold Coast Convention Centre	1–4
6	14 October	@ Brisbane	L 127–106	Chris Cameron (24)	Rod Grizzard (13)	Grizzard, Helms (5)	Brisbane Convention Centre	1–5
7	17 October	Melbourne	W 96–105	Mike Helms (21)	Ben Knight (9)	Rod Grizzard (7)	Singapore Indoor Stadium	1–6
8	21 October	New Zealand	L 99–116	Rod Grizzard (25)	Blagoj Janev (10)	Mike Helms (7)	Singapore Indoor Stadium	1–7
9	28 October	Sydney	L 90–99	Mike Helms (31)	Grizzard, Knight (9)	Mike Helms (3)	Singapore Indoor Stadium	1–8

November: 1–6 (Home: 1–1; Road: 0–5)

Game	Date	Team	Score	High points	High rebounds	High assists	Location Attendance	Record
10	4 November	Perth	W 112–105	Mike Helms (44)	Ben Knight (14)	Mike Helms (4)	Singapore Indoor Stadium	2–8
11	8 November	@ New Zealand	L 98–92	Rod Grizzard (25)	Grizzard, Helms, Knight (7)	John Fitzgerald (4)	North Shore Events Centre	2–9
12	11 November	Adelaide	L 93–111	Rod Grizzard (27)	Ben Knight (16)	Grizzard, Helms (2)	Singapore Indoor Stadium	2–10
13	17 November	@ Townsville	L 110–98	Rod Grizzard (28)	Ben Knight (9)	Shane McDonald (4)	Townsville Entertainment Centre	2–11
14	18 November	@ Brisbane	L 109–90	Rod Grizzard (18)	Rod Grizzard (9)	Cameron, Knight, McDonald (3)	Brisbane Convention Centre	2–12
15	25 November	@ South	L 109–90	Rod Grizzard (26)	Grizzard, Knight (9)	Rod Grizzard (4)	Vodafone Arena	2–13
16	28 November	@ West Sydney	L 126–95	Grizzard, Helms (22)	Ben Knight (11)	Allen, Helms (3)	State Sports Centre	2–14

December: 2–5 (Home: 1–1; Road: 1–4)

Game	Date	Team	Score	High points	High rebounds	High assists	Location Attendance	Record
17	2 December	Brisbane	W 119–102	Mike Helms (31)	Grizzard, Knight (11)	Rod Grizzard (6)	Singapore Indoor Stadium	3–14
18	5 December	@ Wollongong	L 93–72	Mike Helms (20)	Grizzard, Knight (11)	Rod Grizzard (4)	WIN Entertainment Centre	3–15
19	8 December	@ Townsville	L 117–105	Mike Helms (34)	Rod Grizzard (10)	Allen, Grizzard, Knight (4)	Townsville Entertainment Centre	3–16
20	15 December	@ Adelaide	L 104–77	Rod Grizzard (25)	Cameron, Donaldson, Fitzgerald, Grizzard (7)	Mike Helms (4)	Adelaide Arena	3–17
21	19 December	West Sydney	L 99–113	Rod Grizzard (21)	Ben Knight (7)	Grizzard, McDonald (4)	Singapore Indoor Stadium	3–18
22	21 December	@ Cairns	W 89–93	Mike Helms (17)	Ben Knight (14)	Grizzard, McDonald (5)	Cairns Convention Centre	4–18
23	22 December	@ Gold Coast	L 91–86	Rod Grizzard (22)	Rod Grizzard (11)	Mike Helms (8)	Gold Coast Convention Centre	4–19

January: 2–3 (Home: 2–2; Road: 0–1)

Game	Date	Team	Score	High points	High rebounds	High assists	Location Attendance	Record
24	2 January	Perth	L 87–124	Blagoj Janev (20)	Rod Grizzard (11)	Rod Grizzard (3)	Singapore Indoor Stadium	4–20
25	13 January	Wollongong	W 113–102	Mike Helms (28)	Ben Knight (11)	Mike Helms (5)	Singapore Indoor Stadium	5–20
26	20 January	Cairns	L 87–99	Mike Helms (26)	Ben Knight (13)	Shane McDonald (4)	Singapore Indoor Stadium	5–21
27	26 January	@ Melbourne	L 115–82	Rod Grizzard (21)	Ben Knight (9)	Allen, Cameron, Fitzgerald, McDonald (2)	State Netball and Hockey Centre	5–22
28	30 January	South	W 108–93	Rod Grizzard (25)	Rod Grizzard (14)	Helms, McDonald (6)	Singapore Indoor Stadium	6–22

February: 0–2 (Home: 0–1; Road: 0–1)

Game	Date	Team	Score	High points	High rebounds	High assists	Location Attendance	Record
29	9 February	@ Sydney	L 113–84	Rod Grizzard (16)	Ben Knight (10)	Mike Helms (5)	Sydney Entertainment Centre	6–23
30	13 February	Adelaide	L 97–126	Mike Helms (35)	Ben Knight (16)	Rod Grizzard (7)	Singapore Indoor Stadium	6–24

2007–08 season schedule

== Awards ==
=== Singapore Slingers Awards ===
- Most Valuable Player: Mike Helms

=== 2007–08 NBL All-Star Game ===
- World All-Star: Rod Grizzard – 19 points, 8 rebounds, 2 assists and 1 steal vs. Aussie All-Stars @ State Netball and Hockey Centre

== See also ==
- 2007–08 NBL season
- Singapore Slingers
