= 2006–07 Singapore Slingers season =

- Head coach: (Australia) Gordon McLeod
- Captain: (Australia) Ben Knight
- Arena: Singapore Indoor Stadium

NBL results
- Record: 13–20 (39.4%)
- Ladder: 8th
- Finals finish: Elimination finalist (lost to Crocodiles 106–93)
- Stats at NBL.com.au

Player records
- Points: (United States) Helms 22.7
- Rebounds: (Australia) Knight 8.7
- Assists: (Australia) B.Davidson 3.5

Uniforms
Home	Away
- All statistics correct as of 14 February 2007.

The 2006–07 Singapore Slingers season was the 1st season of the franchise in the National Basketball League (NBL).

The Singapore Slingers were the first Asian team to compete in Australia's National Basketball League (NBL). The Slingers play their home games at the 10,000 seat Singapore Indoor Stadium in Kallang, Singapore.

== Roster ==
Note: Flags indicate national team eligibility at FIBA-sanctioned events. Players may hold other non-FIBA nationalities not displayed.

2006–07 Singapore Slingers roster
Players
Coaches

Pos.	No.	Nat.	Name	Ht.	Wt.
G	1	(India)	Hyams, Eban	1.95 m (6 ft 5 in)	86 kg (190 lb)
C	3	(Australia)	Vasiljevic, Pero	2.08 m (6 ft 10 in)	112 kg (247 lb)
F	7	(Australia)	Moore, David (DP)	1.96 m (6 ft 5 in)	96 kg (212 lb)
G	8	(New Zealand)	Kench, Jeremy	1.86 m (6 ft 1 in)	93 kg (205 lb)
F	10	(Australia)	Davidson, Larry	2.06 m (6 ft 9 in)	100 kg (220 lb)
G	12	(Singapore)	Koon, Koh Meng (DP)	1.90 m (6 ft 3 in)	86 kg (190 lb)
F	13	(Australia)	Trahair, Aaron	1.94 m (6 ft 4 in)	101 kg (223 lb)
G	14	(Australia)	Davidson, Brad	1.82 m (6 ft 0 in)	78 kg (172 lb)
F	15	(Singapore)	Matialakan, Pathman (DP)	1.98 m (6 ft 6 in)	102 kg (225 lb)
G	23	(United States)	Helms, Mike (I)	1.84 m (6 ft 0 in)	94 kg (207 lb)
C	30	(Australia)	Melmeth, Ben	2.08 m (6 ft 10 in)	110 kg (243 lb)
F	33	(Australia)	Knight, Ben (C)	2.02 m (6 ft 8 in)	106 kg (234 lb)
F	35	(United States)	Chandler, Marquin (I)	2.02 m (6 ft 8 in)	100 kg (220 lb)

Head coach

- (Australia) Gordon McLeod

Assistant coach(es)

- (Australia) Dean Vickerman
- (Singapore) Neo Beng Siang

Legend

- (C) Team captain
- (DP) Development player
- (I) Import player
- Injured

- Roster
Updated: 6 November 2006

=== Depth chart ===
Pos.	Starting 5	Bench 1	Bench 2
C	Ben Melmeth	Pero Vasiljevic
PF	Ben Knight	Larry Davidson
SF	Marquin Chandler	Aaron Trahair	David Moore
SG	Mike Helms	Jeremy Kench	Pathman Matialakan
PG	Brad Davidson	Eban Hyams	Koh Meng Koon

== Regular season ==
The regular season of the National Basketball League consisted of 33 games, with each team playing each other 3 times. Slinger's will play 16 home games and 17 away games. The Slingers opening match is against the Adelaide 36ers at Singapore's home which is the Singapore Indoor Stadium.

=== Ladder ===
This is the ladder at the end of season, before the finals. The top 8 teams qualified for the finals series.

Pos	2006–07 NBL season											
Pos	Team	Pld	W	L	PCT	Last 5	Streak	Home	Away	PF	PA	PP
1	Brisbane Bullets	33	28	5	84.85%	5–0	W18	16–1	12–4	3804	3326	114.37%
2	Melbourne Tigers	33	25	8	75.76%	4–1	W3	15–2	10–6	3453	3228	106.97%
3	Perth Wildcats	33	23	10	69.70%	2–3	W1	14–3	8–8	3331	3113	107.00%
4	Sydney Kings	33	20	13	60.61%	3–2	W1	14–2	6–11	3236	3119	103.75%
5	Townsville Crocodiles	33	19	14	57.58%	2–3	L1	13–4	6–10	3626	3516	103.13%
6	Cairns Taipans	33	17	16	51.52%	2–3	L2	11–6	5–11	3292	3284	100.24%
7	South Dragons	33	15	18	45.45%	2–3	W1	8–8	7–10	3418	3514	97.27%
8	Singapore Slingers	33	13	20	39.39%	3–2	L2	9–7	4–13	3297	3435	95.98%
9	Wollongong Hawks^{1 2}	33	11	22	33.33%	1–4	L1	6–11	5–11	3237	3395	95.35%
10	New Zealand Breakers^{1 2}	33	11	22	33.33%	2–3	L1	9–7	2–15	3382	3538	95.59%
11	Adelaide 36ers^{1}	33	11	22	33.33%	1–4	W1	7–9	4–13	3326	3555	93.56%
12	West Sydney Razorbacks	33	5	28	15.15%	2–3	W1	4–12	1–16	3221	3600	89.47%

Updated to match(es) played on 11 February 2007. Source: NBL.com.au

The NBL tie-breaker system as outlined in the NBL Rules and Regulations states that in the case of an identical win-loss record, the results in games played between the teams will determine order of seeding.

=== Regular season ===
2006–07 game log
Total: 13–20 (home: 9–7; road: 4–13)
September: 1–2 (Home: 1–1; Road: 0–1)

Game	Date	Team	Score	High points	High rebounds	High assists	Location Attendance	Record
1	20 September	Adelaide	W 98–91	Marquin Chandler (21)	Helms, Melmeth (8)	Chandler, Melmeth, Trahair (3)	Singapore Indoor Stadium	1–0
2	22 September	@ Perth	L 94–82	Mike Helms (24)	Ben Knight (11)	Mike Helms (5)	Challenge Stadium	1–1
3	27 September	Perth	L 100–109	Mike Helms (38)	Ben Melmeth (10)	Marquin Chandler (4)	Singapore Indoor Stadium	1–2

October: 2–5 (Home: 2–3; Road: 0–2)

Game	Date	Team	Score	High points	High rebounds	High assists	Location Attendance	Record
4	9 October	West Sydney	W 126–89	Marquin Chandler (28)	Ben Knight (10)	Ben Knight (7)	Singapore Indoor Stadium	2–2
5	12 October	Wollongong	L 87–105	Mike Helms (14)	Ben Knight (13)	Chandler, L.Davidson, Kench (2)	Singapore Indoor Stadium	2–3
6	14 October	@ Melbourne	L 113–102	Mike Helms (24)	Ben Knight (8)	Marquin Chandler (4)	State Netball Hockey Centre	2–4
7	18 October	South	W 104–96	Marquin Chandler (32)	Chandler, Knight (9)	Brad Davidson (5)	Singapore Indoor Stadium	3–4
8	20 October	@ West Sydney	L 97–80	Mike Helms (21)	Mike Helms (11)	Helms, Vasiljevic (3)	State Sports Centre	3–5
9	26 October	Cairns	L 98–102	Mike Helms (27)	Ben Knight (11)	Brad Davidson (3)	Singapore Indoor Stadium	3–6
10	29 October	Sydney	L 83–90	Mike Helms (28)	L.Davidson, Knight (8)	Aaron Trahair (6)	Singapore Indoor Stadium	3–7

November: 0–3 (Home: 0–0; Road: 0–3)

Game	Date	Team	Score	High points	High rebounds	High assists	Location Attendance	Record
11	3 November	@ Cairns	L 98–90	Mike Helms (20)	Ben Knight (9)	Chandler, Helms, Trahair (3)	Cairns Convention Centre	3–8
12	27 November	@ Brisbane	L 131–93	Ben Melmeth (21)	Ben Knight (11)	Ben Knight (3)	Brisbane Convention Centre	3–9
13	29 November	@ Townsville	L 120–101	Marquin Chandler (23)	Larry Davidson (11)	Helms, Trahair (4)	Townsville Entertainment Centre	3–10

December: 4–2 (Home: 3–0; Road: 1–2)

Game	Date	Team	Score	High points	High rebounds	High assists	Location Attendance	Record
14	10 December	@ Wollongong	W 84–110	Marquin Chandler (31)	Marquin Chandler (11)	B.Davidson, Helms (6)	WIN Entertainment Centre	4–10
15	13 December	New Zealand	W 111–94	Marquin Chandler (34)	Ben Knight (7)	Brad Davidson (4)	Singapore Indoor Stadium	5–10
16	16 December	@ Adelaide	L 102–100	Chandler, Helms (20)	Ben Knight (14)	Chandler, B.Davidson (5)	Adelaide Arena	5–11
17	20 December	West Sydney	W 115–93	Mike Helms (31)	Marquin Chandler (10)	Brad Davidson (6)	Singapore Indoor Stadium	6–11
18	27 December	@ Perth	L 105–88	Marquin Chandler (26)	Ben Melmeth (10)	Ben Melmeth (5)	Challenge Stadium	6–12
19	29 December	New Zealand	W 109–96	Mike Helms (31)	Ben Melmeth (13)	Melmeth, Trahair (5)	Singapore Indoor Stadium	7–12

January: 4–6 (Home: 3–2; Road: 1–4)

Game	Date	Team	Score	High points	High rebounds	High assists	Location Attendance	Record
20	3 January	South	L 85–110	Mike Helms (17)	Ben Knight (14)	Brad Davidson (4)	Singapore Indoor Stadium	7–13
21	4 January	Townsville	W 114–103	Mike Helms (34)	Ben Melmeth (14)	B.Davidson, Trahair (4)	Singapore Indoor Stadium	8–13
22	6 January	@ Brisbane	L 131–116	Marquin Chandler (31)	Ben Melmeth (10)	Marquin Chandler (5)	Brisbane Convention Centre	8–14
23	10 January	Sydney	W 96–88	Marquin Chandler (24)	Chandler, Knight (6)	Mike Helms (5)	Singapore Indoor Stadium	9–14
24	12 January	@ Cairns	W 101–113	Marquin Chandler (30)	Chandler, Melmeth (7)	Brad Davidson (4)	Cairns Convention Centre	10–14
25	13 January	@ Townsville	L 140–100	Brad Davidson (22)	Ben Melmeth (8)	Ben Knight (5)	Townsville Entertainment Centre	10–15
26	17 January	Melbourne	L 89–96	Marquin Chandler (24)	Mike Helms (11)	Brad Davidson (4)	Singapore Indoor Stadium	10–16
27	24 January	@ New Zealand	L 103–100	Mike Helms (26)	Ben Melmeth (7)	Brad Davidson (6)	North Shore Events Centre	10–17
28	27 January	@ Melbourne	L 125–114	Ben Knight (33)	Ben Knight (9)	Brad Davidson (7)	State Netball Hockey Centre	10–18
29	31 January	Adelaide	W 105–100	Aaron Trahair (27)	Ben Knight (20)	B.Davidson, Melmeth (3)	Singapore Indoor Stadium	11–18

February: 2–2 (Home: 0–1; Road: 2–1)

Game	Date	Team	Score	High points	High rebounds	High assists	Location Attendance	Record
30	2 February	@ Wollongong	W 93–96	Mike Helms (26)	Ben Knight (13)	Aaron Trahair (7)	WIN Entertainment Centre	12–18
31	3 February	@ South	W 100–114	Aaron Trahair (28)	Ben Melmeth (10)	Brad Davidson (12)	Vodafone Arena	13–18
32	7 February	Brisbane	L 102–134	Mike Helms (30)	Pero Vasiljevic (6)	Aaron Trahair (6)	Singapore Indoor Stadium	13–19
33	11 February	@ Sydney	L 102–76	Mike Helms (29)	Larry Davidson (8)	Aaron Trahair (4)	Sydney Entertainment Centre	13–20

2006–07 season schedule

== Postseason ==
The elimination finals were played over 4 days. The first two teams automatically went ahead to the semi-finals. The winner of Game 1 went on to play the 4th placed team, while the winner of Game 2 went on to play the 3rd placed team.

=== Finals ===
2007 finals game log
Total: 0–1 (home: 0–0; road: 0–1)
Elimination finals: 0–1 (Home: 0–0; Road: 0–1)

Game	Date	Team	Score	High points	High rebounds	High assists	Location Attendance	Record
1	14 February	@ Townsville	L 106–93	Ben Knight (21)	Ben Knight (17)	B.Davidson, Trahair (6)	Townsville Entertainment Centre	0–1

== Awards ==
=== Player of the Week ===
- Round 12: Marquin Chandler – 31 points, 11 rebounds, 3 assists, 2 steal and 3 blocks vs. Wollongong Hawks @ WIN Entertainment Centre

=== Singapore Slingers Awards ===
- Most Valuable Player: Mike Helms

=== 2006–07 NBL All-Star Game ===
- World All-Star: Mike Helms – 17 points, 3 rebounds, 2 assists and 1 steal vs. Aussie All-Stars @ Adelaide Arena

== See also ==
- 2006–07 NBL season
- Singapore Slingers
