= 2010–11 Singapore Slingers season =

{{{NBLyear}}} {{{clubname}}} season
- Head coach: Neo Beng Siang
- Captain: Kyle Jeffers/ Steven Khoo
- Arena: SIS

NBL results
- Record: 7–8 (46.7%)
- Ladder: 4th
- Finals finish: TBD
- Stats at NBL.com.au

The 2010-11 ABL Season was the second season for the Singapore Slingers in the Asean Basketball League Australia. The Slingers went into this season without their 2009-2010 season's local star Hong Wei Jian, who was out with a career-ending knee injury.

== Off-season ==
=== Additions ===
Player	Signed	Former Team
Leo Avenido	Signed to 1-year deal	Brunei Barracudas
Marcus Skinner	Signed to 1-year deal	Mid-Michigan Destroyers
Shengyu Lim	Signed to 1-year deal	Hwa Chong Institution
Ng Hanbin	Signed to 1-year deal	none
Teo Chun Hoe	Signed to 1-year deal	none
Tan Chin Hong	Signed to 1-year deal	none

=== Subtractions ===
Player	Reason Left	New Team
Marcus Ng	Return to Australia	n/a
Michael Soon Yuh Wong	To focus on teaching career	n/a
Michael Leblanc	Did not resign	n/a
Lim Wai Sian	Head Injury	n/a
Prasad Sadasivan	Injury	n/a

== Roster ==
Singapore Slingers roster
Players
Coaches

Pos.	No.	Nat.	Name	Ht.	Wt.
G	2	(Singapore)	Oh, Desmond	1.78 m (5 ft 10 in)	75 kg (165 lb)
G	5	(Singapore)	Wong, Wei Long	1.74 m (5 ft 9 in)	77 kg (170 lb)
G/F	10	(Singapore)	Hong, Wei Jian	1.80 m (5 ft 11 in)	65 kg (143 lb)
G	11	(Singapore)	Tan, Jin Hong	1.85 m (6 ft 1 in)	77 kg (170 lb)
PF	12	(Singapore)	Lim, Shengyu	1.91 m (6 ft 3 in)	79 kg (174 lb)
F	13	(Singapore)	Khoo, Steven	1.88 m (6 ft 2 in)	85 kg (187 lb)
F/C	15	(Singapore)	Matialakan, Pathman	2.02 m (6 ft 8 in)	102 kg (225 lb)
G	18	(Philippines)	Avenido, Leo (I)	1.88 m (6 ft 2 in)	81 kg (179 lb)
PG	19	(Philippines)	Vergara, Al (I)	1.70 m (5 ft 7 in)	75 kg (165 lb)
F	24	(United States)	Skinner, Marcus (I)	2.00 m (6 ft 7 in)	105 kg (231 lb)
G/F	26	(Singapore)	Ng, Han Bin	1.92 m (6 ft 4 in)	75 kg (165 lb)
F	30	(Singapore)	Teo, Chun Hoe	1.92 m (6 ft 4 in)	88 kg (194 lb)
F/C	31	(United States)	Jeffers, Kyle (C / I)	2.06 m (6 ft 9 in)	120 kg (265 lb)

Head coach

- (Singapore) Neo Beng Siang

Legend

- (C) Team captain
- Injured

- Roster

== 2010-11 Singapore Slingers Season ==
- 3 October: Singapore Slingers vs. Satria Muda Britama; Singapore Indoor Stadium, Singapore(W, 94-93)
- 9 October: Singapore Slingers @ Philippines Patriots; Ynares Sports Arena, Philippines(L, 59-62)
- 17 October: Singapore Slingers vs. Westports KL Dragons; Singapore Indoor Stadium, Singapore (W, 74-61)
- 23 October: Singapore Slingers @ Westports KL Dragons; MABA Stadium, Malaysia (L, 74-81)
- 31 October: Singapore Slingers vs. Chang Thailand Slammers; Singapore Indoor Stadium, Singapore (W, 87-81)
- 6 November: Singapore Slingers @ Satria Muda BritAma; The BritAma Stadium, Indonesia (L, 83-88)
- 10 November: Singapore Slingers @ Brunei Barracudas; Brunei Indoor Stadium, Brunei Darussalam (W, 81-74)
- 14 November: Singapore Slingers vs. Philippines Patriots; Singapore Indoor Stadium, Singapore (L, 85-87)
- 23 November: Singapore Slingers vs. Brunei Barracudas; Singapore Indoor Stadium, Singapore (W, 74-70)
- 4 December: Singapore Slingers @ Chang Thailand Slammers; Nimibutr National Stadium, Thailand (L, 66-77)
- 14 December: Singapore Slingers vs Satria Muda BritAma; Singapore Indoor Stadium, Singapore(L, 83-73)
- 18 December: Singapore Slingers @ Philippines Patriots; Ynares Sports Arena, Singapore(L, 73-80)
- 5 January: Singapore Slingers @ Westsports KL Dragons; MABA Stadium, Malaysia (W, 93-90)
- 9 January: Singapore Slingers vs Brunei Barracudas; Singapore Indoor Stadium, Singapore (W, 102-61)
- 15 January: Singapore Slingers @. Chang Thailand Slammers; Nimibutr National Stadium, Thailand (L, 65-66)

The Slingers ended the season with a league fourth-best 7-8 win-loss record.

=== Playoff round ===
- 24 January: Singapore Slingers @. Chang Thailand Slammers; Nimibutr National Stadium, Thailand (L, 76-81)
- 1 February: Singapore Slingers vs Chang Thailand Slammers, Singapore Indoor Stadium, Singapore
- 6 February: Singapore Slingers @. Chang Thailand Slammers; Nimibutr National Stadium, Thailand
