= 2012 Singapore Slingers season =

{{{NBLyear}}} {{{clubname}}} season
- Head coach: Neo Beng Siang
- Arena: SIS

NBL results
- Stats at NBL.com.au

The 2012 ABL season is the third season for the Singapore Slingers in the ABL.

== Off-season ==
On 15 November 2011, the Slingers announced that they will add 3 new imports - Centre Donald Little, Forward Louis Graham, and Filipino-American point guard Don Dulay - to bolster their line-up for the upcoming Season 3 of the AirAsia ASEAN Basketball.

On 27 November 2011, the Slingers announced the return of their head coach, Neo Beng Siang, for the upcoming season.

On 29 November 2011, the Slingers announced the signings of a trio of local players - Guards Desmond Oh and Wei Long Wong, and Forward Shengyu Lim.
