= 2006–07 NBL All-Star Game =

2006/07 NBL All Star logo

The 2006/07 NBL All-Star Game (Australia) was held at the Distinctive Homes Dome in Adelaide, South Australia on 25 November 2006. The game was broadcast live on Fox Sports in Australia.

The World All-Stars held off the Aussie All-Stars to win 136-133 with Rashad Tucker of the Melbourne Tigers contributing a near triple-double with 21 points, 12 rebounds and 9 assists. He was subsequently named as the MVP of the All-Star game.

== Line-up ==
=== Aussies ===
==== Starters ====
Name	Club	Position
Chris Anstey	Melbourne Tigers	Centre
Joe Ingles	South Dragons	Small forward
Sam Mackinnon	Brisbane Bullets	Power forward
Darryl McDonald	Melbourne Tigers	Point guard
Brad Newley	Townsville Crocodiles	Shooting guard

==== Reserves ====
Name	Club	Position
Ben Pepper	New Zealand Breakers	Centre
C. J. Bruton	Brisbane Bullets	Guard
Tony Ronaldson	Perth Wildcats	Forward
Paul Rogers	Perth Wildcats	Centre
Martin Cattalini	Cairns Taipans	Forward

=== World ===
==== Starters ====
Name	Club	Position
Shawn Redhage	Perth Wildcats	Centre
Rashad Tucker	Melbourne Tigers	Power forward
Larry Abney	Townsville Crocodiles	Small forward
Cortez Groves	Wollongong Hawks	Point guard
Willie Farley	Adelaide 36ers	Shooting guard

==== Reserves ====
Name	Club	Position
Nick Horvath	Adelaide 36ers	Power forward
Carlos Powell	New Zealand Breakers	Forward
Mike Helms	Singapore Slingers	Guard
Dave Thomas	Melbourne Tigers	Forward
Kevin Owens	Cairns Taipans	Centre

== Dunk Competition ==
The Dunk Competition was won by Carlos Powell of the New Zealand Breakers from Willie Farley of the Adelaide 36ers.

== See also ==
- NBL All-Star Game (Australia)
- National Basketball League (Australia)
