= Lim Shengyu =

Singaporean basketball player (born 1990)

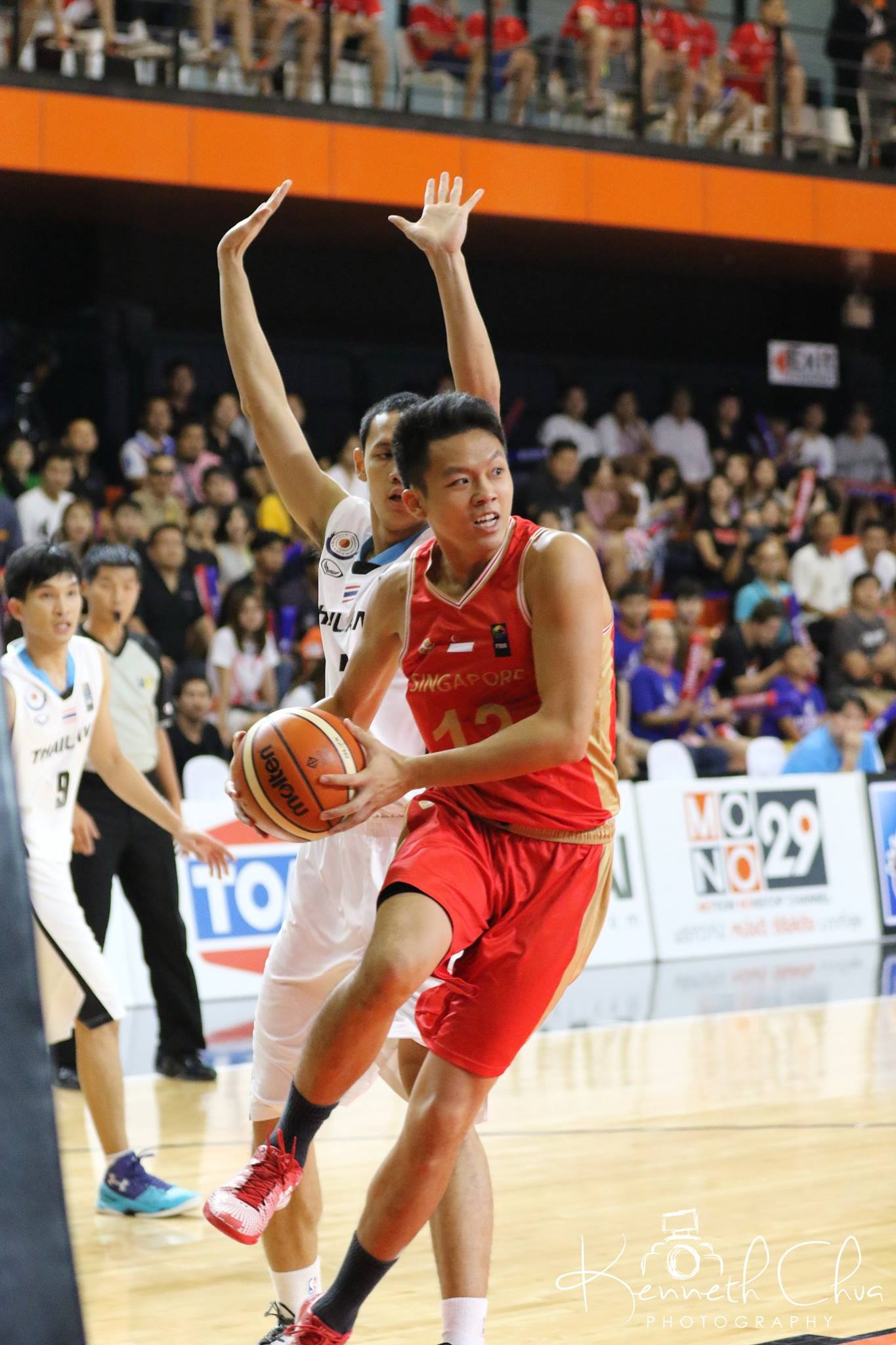
- Lim Shengyu from the Singapore National Team driving past the Thai's defense

No. 12 – Singapore Slingers
- Position: Forward
- League: Asean Basketball League

Personal information
- Born: 7 December 1990 (age 35) Singapore

Career information
- High school: Bukit Panjang Government High School
- College: National University of Singapore

Career history
- 2010–2013: Singapore Slingers

Career highlights
- 2007 National 'A' Division MVP; 2008 National 'A' Division MVP; 2013 ABL 3-point Contest Champion
Medals
Men's basketball
Representing Singapore
Southeast Asian Games
Bronze medal – third place	2013 SEA Games	Team
Bronze medal – third place	2015 SEA Games	Team
SEABA Cup
Bronze medal – third place	2016 Stankovic Cup	Team

Lim Shengyu (born 7 December 1990) is a Singaporean professional basketball player who plays forward, most recently for the Singapore Slingers in the Asean Basketball League (ABL).

After winning the Most Valuable Player Award in both his two years playing for Hwa Chong Institution, Shengyu was selected as one of three Singaporean players to attend the Adidas Nations basketball camp in Shanghai and represent Singapore to participate in the NBA Without Borders Camp in New Delhi in 2008.

Lim also spent 10 years in the Singapore National Basketball (Senior) team, winning 2 bronze medals for his country in both the 2013 and 2015 editions of the Southeast Asian Games. Lim is best known for his sharp-shooting, especially his ability to make the three-point shot.

== Education ==
In 2016, Lim completed his degree in Environmental Engineering from Asia's top university, the National University of Singapore, with first-class honours.

== Club career ==
On 1 September 2010, Lim was one of the four new rookies that signed with the Singapore Slingers.

On 29 November 2011, Lim, together with Wong Wei Long and Desmond Oh, signed new contracts with the Slingers for the 2012 ASEAN Basketball League Season.

On 16 March 2013, during the ABL Hoops fest, despite being the youngest participant in the competition, Lim won the first-ever ABL three-point shoot-out contest during the Sapporo Slam Jam event. He qualified top of the players with 14 points in the first round. In the final round, he finished with 13 points, defeating Leo Avenido to claim the contest.

In July 2011, Lim Shengyu, along with Steven Khoo and Al Vergara, played for Singapore Siglap, one of the 4 teams competing in the 2011 Malaysia National Basketball League.

== International career ==
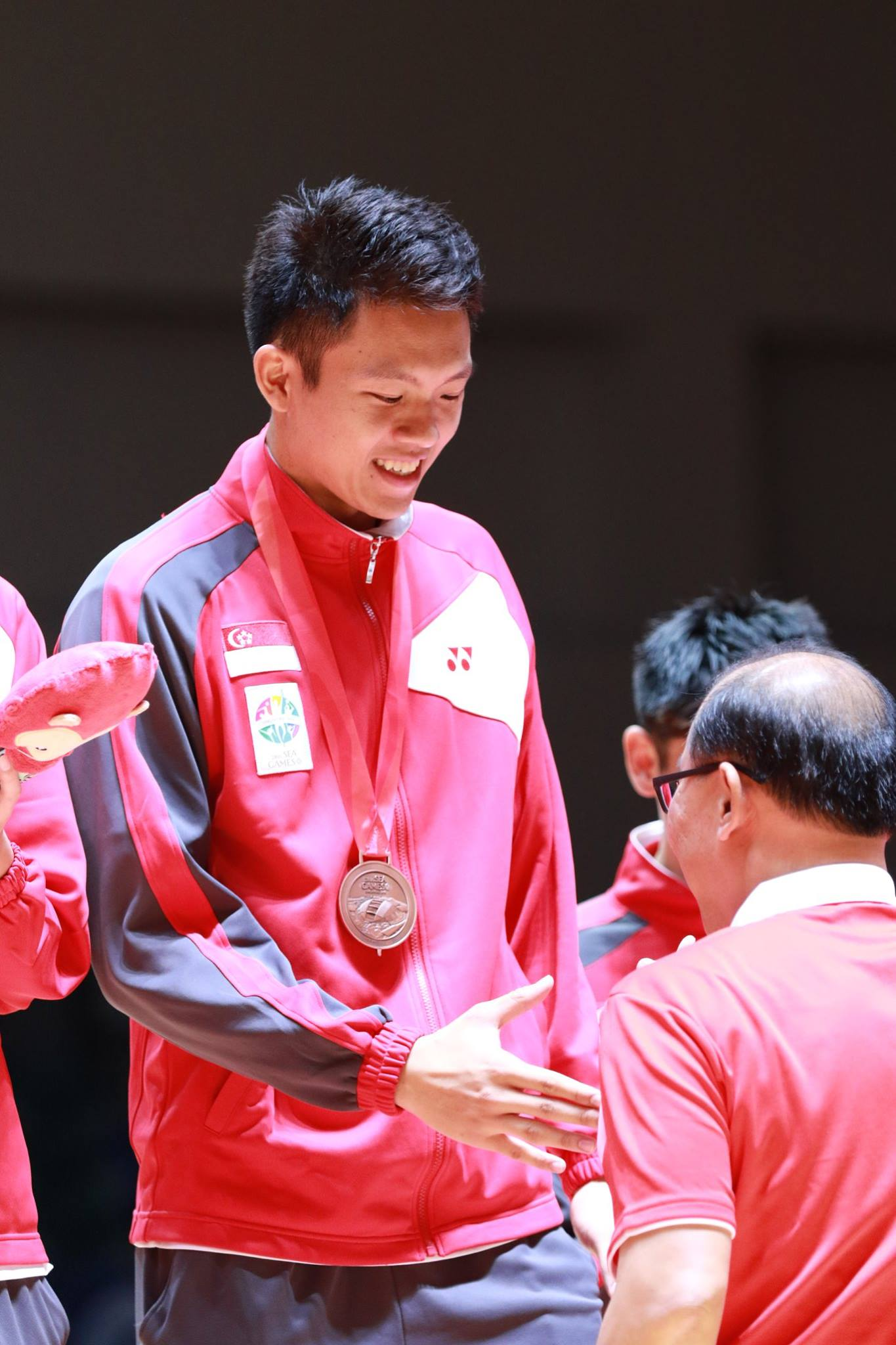
Lim receiving his 2015 SEA Games bronze medal.

Lim was a member of the 2011 Southeast Asian Games Singapore national basketball team. He led the team in scoring with 14.3 per game.

Lim continued to play an integral role for the national team and helped Singapore basketball clinch its first SEA Games medal (bronze) in 34 years in the 2013 SEA Games in Myanmar since 1979.

At the 2015 SEA Games held in Singapore, Lim once again represented Team Singapore to win his second consecutive bronze medal, despite suffering a major ankle injury in the semi-finals against Indonesia.

In 2018, Lim retired from international basketball to pursue his career in coaching and private tuition.

== Filmography ==
Year	Title	Role	Notes	Ref
2014	Meeting the Giant	He Dadi		
