= Hassan Adams =

American basketball player (born 1984)

Personal information
- Born: June 20, 1984 (age 42) Inglewood, California, U.S.
- Listed height: 6 ft 4 in (1.93 m)
- Listed weight: 220 lb (100 kg)

Career information
- High school: Banning (Los Angeles, California); Verbum Dei (Los Angeles, California); Westchester (Los Angeles, California)
- College: Arizona (2002–2006)
- NBA draft: 2006: 2nd round, 54th overall pick
- Drafted by: New Jersey Nets
- Playing career: 2006–2014
- Position: Shooting guard
- Number: 8, 3

Career history
- 2006–2007: New Jersey Nets
- 2007–2008: Ignis Novara
- 2008: Siviglia Wear Teramo
- 2008–2009: Toronto Raptors
- 2009: Vojvodina Srbijagas
- 2010–2011: Rain or Shine Elasto Painters
- 2012–2014: Guaros de Lara
- 2014: Singapore Slingers

Career highlights
- First-team All-Pac-10 (2006); Second-team Parade All-American (2002); California Mr. Basketball (2002); McDonald's All-American (2002)
- Stats at NBA.com
- Stats at Basketball Reference
Medals
Men's basketball
Representing United States
FIBA Americas U20 Championship
Gold medal – first place	2004 Halifax	National team

Hassan Olawale Adams (born June 20, 1984) is an American former professional basketball player. He played college basketball for the Arizona Wildcats. Adams was selected in the 2006 NBA draft by the New Jersey Nets and played in the National Basketball Association (NBA) for two seasons with the Nets and Toronto Raptors. He also played overseas in Italy, Serbia, the Philippines, Venezuela and Singapore.

== High school career ==
Adams played at Phineas Banning High School in Wilmington, Los Angeles, for his freshman season and Verbum Dei Jesuit High School in Los Angeles during his sophomore season. Adams transferred to Westchester High School in Westchester, Los Angeles, where he averaged 18 points, 5 rebounds and 3 assists while leading his team to a 32–2 record, the California State Division I-A Championship, and a USA Today No. 1 ranking in his senior year. A McDonald's All-American and second team Parade All-America pick. Named California Mr. Basketball, the first guard to receive the honor since Baron Davis in 1997.

== Collegiate career ==
Adams played collegiately at the University of Arizona from 2002 to 2006. Adams played primarily at the small forward position under coach Lute Olson and wore number 21 throughout his collegiate career. He was named All-Pac-10 First Team in 2006.

== Professional career ==
In the 2006 NBA draft, Adams was selected by the New Jersey Nets in the second round with the 54th pick. In pre-draft workouts, Adams was injured after Texas forward P. J. Tucker stepped on his foot. Adams made the Nets roster and in his rookie year and started eight games, finishing with 61 played games that season. He scored his first points on November 24. On November 29, 2006, Adams scored a career-high 16 points against the Boston Celtics in 23 minutes of playing time. On July 14, 2007, the Nets waived Adams.

Adams worked out with the Cleveland Cavaliers and played in three preseason games for the Cavs, averaging 2.7 ppg, 0.7 rpg and 0.3 apg in 6.3 mpg. On October 27, 2007, the Cavs waived him.

On July 1, 2008, Adams signed a two-year contract with the Toronto Raptors after attending the team's free-agent camp.

On January 7, 2009, Adams was traded to the Los Angeles Clippers along with cash considerations for a future conditional second-round pick. He was quickly waived by the Clippers, and signed with KK Vojvodina Srbijagas shortly after.

In 2011, Adams played in the Philippine Basketball Association as an import for the Rain or Shine Elasto Painters during the 2011 PBA Commissioner's Cup.

In July 2014, he signed with the Singapore Slingers for the 2014 ABL season.

On October 12, 2015, Adams signed with the upcoming AmeriLeague, however, the league folded after it was discovered the founder was a con-artist.

== NBA career statistics ==
Legend
GP	Games played	GS	Games started	MPG	Minutes per game
FG%	Field goal percentage	3P%	3-point field goal percentage	FT%	Free throw percentage
RPG	Rebounds per game	APG	Assists per game	SPG	Steals per game
BPG	Blocks per game	PPG	Points per game	**Bold**	Career high

=== Regular season ===
Year	Team	GP	GS	MPG	FG%	3P%	FT%	RPG	APG	SPG	BPG	PPG
2006–07	New Jersey	**61**	**8**	**8.1**	**.556**	.000	**.667**	**1.3**	**.2**	**.3**	**.1**	**2.9**
2008–09	Toronto	12	0	4.3	.308	—	.500	.6	.1	.1	**.1**	.9
Career		73	8	7.5	.534	.000	.643	1.2	.2	.2	.1	2.5

=== Playoffs ===
Year	Team	GP	GS	MPG	FG%	3P%	FT%	RPG	APG	SPG	BPG	PPG
2007	New Jersey	6	0	1.5	.500	—	—	.2	.0	.0	.0	.3
Career		6	0	1.5	.500	—	—	.2	.0	.0	.0	.3
