= Darren Ng =

Chinese-Australian basketball player

Darren Ng 黄立人
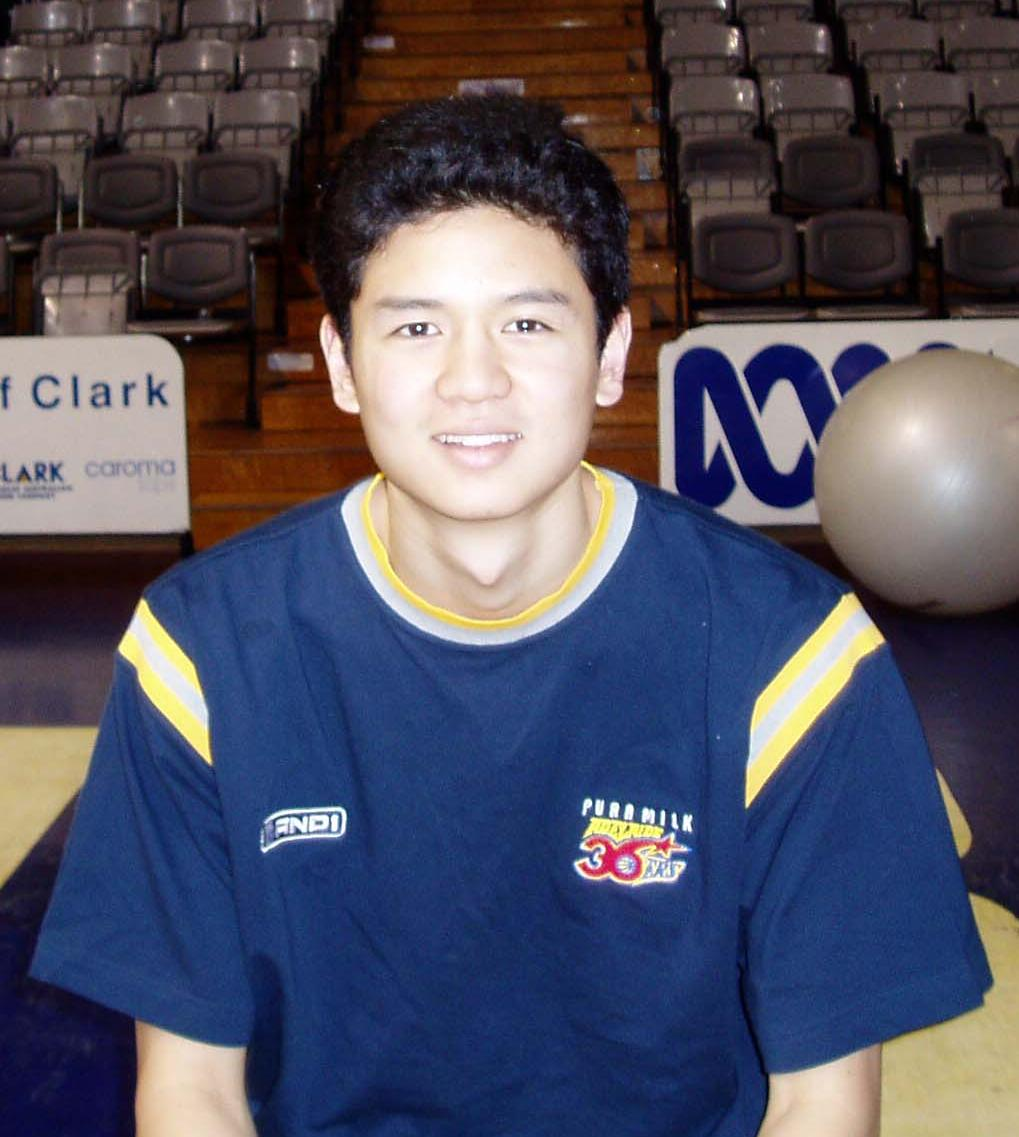

Personal information
- Born: 18 December 1983 (age 42) Adelaide, South Australia
- Listed height: 189 cm (6 ft 2 in)
- Listed weight: 77 kg (170 lb)

Career information
- High school: St Peter's College (Adelaide, South Australia)
- Playing career: 2002–2017
- Position: Shooting guard / point guard

Career history
- 2002–2005; 2006–2007: Adelaide 36ers
- 2007–2009: Singapore Slingers
- 2009–2012: Adelaide 36ers
- 2013–2017: Woodville Warriors

Career highlights
- 2x CABL champion (2010, 2014)

Darren Ng
- Simplified Chinese: 黄立人
- Traditional Chinese: 黃立人
- Hokkien POJ: N̂g Lia̍p-jîn
Transcriptions
Standard Mandarin
- Hanyu Pinyin: Huáng Lìrén
- IPA: [xwǎŋ lî.ɻə̌n]
Yue: Cantonese
- Jyutping: Wong4 Lap6-jan4
- IPA: [wɔŋ˩ lɐp̚˨.jɐn˩]
Southern Min
- Hokkien POJ: N̂g Lia̍p-jîn
- Tâi-lô: N̂g Lia̍p-jîn

Darren Ng (Chinese: 黄立人; pinyin: Huáng Lìrén; born 18 December 1983) is an Australian former professional basketball player. Ng was known as one of the better three-point shooters in the National Basketball League (NBL).

He decided to sit out the 2012–13 NBL season for family and career reasons, being a new father and a practising physician as a resident doctor at the Royal Adelaide Hospital (RAH). For the 2013–14 NBL season, Ng returned to the 36ers, not as a player but as the club doctor.

== Early life ==
Ng is the oldest child of a practicing Adelaide GP. Both of his younger brothers have also finished medical school making a total of four fully qualified doctors in the Ng family. Born and bred in Adelaide, Ng went to St Peter's College and it was in Year 10 that he decided to pursue a career in medicine. However, he would end up juggling his studies with his career in basketball as he was signed by NBL team the Adelaide 36ers as a development player in 2002.

== Career ==
In 2001, Ng played at the national under 18 tournament where he was ranked fourth overall in scoring at 21 points per game.

Ng started his NBL career with the 36ers in 2002 and played with them through to the end of the 2006–07 NBL season, although he did sit out the entire 2005–06 NBL season to pursue his medical studies. Ng signed with the Singapore Slingers for the 2007–08 NBL season and averaged a career high 13.3 points, 4.5 rebounds and 1.8 assists per game. The Slingers folded before the start of the 2008–09 season, leaving him without a team although he later played for the Slingers in their International Challenge Series.

While pursuing his medical studies, Ng played for Sturt and Woodville in the ABA and won the Woollacott Medal award as the leading player in the 2006 ABA Central Conference.

On 18 June 2009, it was announced that Ng would make his return to the 36ers. The 2009–10 NBL season saw Ng average 8.6 points, 2.2 rebounds and 1.9 assists per game. His 2010–11 season was cut short when he rolled his ankle in a clash with Kirk Penney of the New Zealand Breakers on 8 January. X-rays cleared Ng of any broken bones but further MRI scans revealed significant ligament damage which has put him on the sidelines for an expected 8–12 weeks.

Ng made his comeback at the start of the 2011–12 season and while seeing limited time on the court has played all 14 of the 36ers games for the season as of 2 January 2012 and is averaging 6 points, 1.6 assists and 0.8 rebounds in 13.9 minutes of game time. He hit a season high 20 points on 8/13 shooting including 4/8 from outside the Three-point line in a losing effort against the Gold Coast Blaze on 26 November as Adelaide went down 82–95 at the Adelaide Arena.

In a poll of NBL players (taken before the start of the 2011–12 season), Ng was rated the best shooter in the league with 21% of players polled voting for the Doctor ahead of import guards Andrew Warren (Cairns Taipans - 16%) and Kevin Lisch (Perth Wildcats - 14%).

In August 2012, and shortly after the birth of his son, it was announced that Ng had decided to voluntarily sit out the 2012–13 NBL season after he told Adelaide 36ers officials he wanted at least 12 months off from NBL duties to spend time with family, concentrate on his medical career and freshen up mentally. "I talked to the club (36ers) about coming back ... but I felt it was the right time to give it a break," Ng said. "I've just had a baby and am well entrenched in general practice training. I'll reassess it (NBL future) again next year...But it's probably going to be hard to stay away completely from basketball so at this stage I'm planning to continue playing state league (with Sturt in 2013)."

In 2014, Ng won his second Central ABL championship in the Woodville Warriors' 80–78 win over the West Adelaide Bearcats.

After spending four seasons with the Woodville Warriors, Ng announced his retirement from playing professional basketball in 2017.

== Medical career ==
Ng attended the University of Adelaide's Medical school while also pursuing his career as a professional basketball player. After graduating with a Bachelor of Medicine, Bachelor of Surgery (MBBS), Ng has been working as a resident doctor at the Royal Adelaide Hospital's Emergency department. Ironically during the 2011–12 pre-season, Ng had to be admitted to the hospital with pneumonia after games with Sturt and training with the 36ers left him feeling flat.

On 26 September 2013, the Adelaide 36ers announced that Ng would return to the club in the 2013–14 NBL season in the role of club doctor.
