= Dennis Trammell =

American basketball player

Dennis A. Trammell Jr.
Personal information
- Born: February 6, 1982 (age 44) Chicago, Illinois
- Listed height: 6 ft 3 in (1.91 m)
- Listed weight: 210 lb (95 kg)

Career information
- High school: Westinghouse (Chicago, Illinois)
- College: New Mexico State University (2000–2002); Ball State (2003–2005)
- NBA draft: 2005: undrafted
- Playing career: 2005–2007
- Position: Shooting guard

Career history
- 2006: Canterbury Rams, New Zealand
- 2006–2007: USC Heidelberg

Career highlights
- NZNBL scoring champion (2006); First-team All-MAC (2005)All American (2002-2005)

Dennis Trammell (born February 6, 1982) is an American former professional basketball player. He played college basketball at New Mexico University and Ball State University. At 6 feet 3 inches (1.91 m), he played shooting guard.

In 2005, he signed with Union Athletic of Uruguay but left before appearing in a game for them. In February 2006, he was tested by KK Siroki Eronet of Bosnia but was subsequently not signed. He later signed with the Canterbury Rams of the New Zealand National Basketball League (NZNBL) for the 2006 season. He starred for the Rams, leading the league in scoring with 25.6 points per game. He excelled alongside point guard Jeremy Kench. For the 2006–07 season, Trammell played for USC Heidelberg of Germany. In 28 games, he averaged 17 ppg, 5rpg, and 2.2apg.
