= Shane McDonald =

Australian basketball player

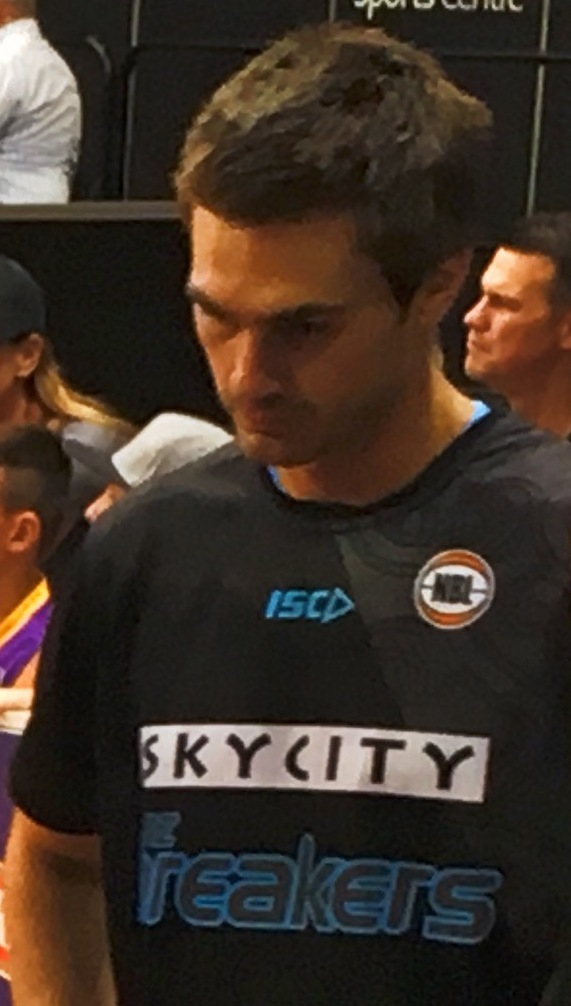
- McDonald with the New Zealand Breakers in 2015

Personal information
- Born: 29 May 1985 (age 41)
- Listed height: 188 cm (6 ft 2 in)

Career information
- High school: Horsham College (Horsham, Victoria)
- College: Nova Southeastern (2004–2005)
- Playing career: 2005–2019
- Position: Point guard

Career history
- 2005: Albury Wodonga Bandits
- 2006–2019: Nunawading Spectres
- 2007–2008: Singapore Slingers
- 2009: Perth Wildcats
- 2012: Melbourne Tigers
- 2015–2016: New Zealand Breakers

Career highlights
- NBL1 champion (2019); SEABL champion (2011); SEABL MVP (2013); SEABL Grand Final MVP (2011); 7× All-SEABL Team (2007, 2011–2016)

Shane McDonald (born 29 May 1985) is an Australian former professional basketball player. He had four stints in the National Basketball League (NBL) with the Singapore Slingers, Perth Wildcats, Melbourne Tigers and New Zealand Breakers. The majority of his career was spent in the South East Australian Basketball League (SEABL) for the Nunawading Spectres, winning a championship in 2011 and league MVP honours in 2013. In his final season, he helped the Spectres win the 2019 NBL1 championship.

== Early life and college ==
McDonald attended Horsham College in Horsham, Victoria. He grew up playing for the Horsham Hornets.

For the 2004–05 U.S. college season, McDonald played for the Nova Southeastern Sharks men's basketball team.

== Professional career ==
=== NBL ===
McDonald made his debut in the National Basketball League (NBL) in the 2007–08 season with the Singapore Slingers. In 29 games, he averaged 7.9 points, 2.4 rebounds and 2.5 assists per game.

In January 2009, McDonald joined the Perth Wildcats during the 2008–09 NBL season. He played five games for the Wildcats.

In January 2012, McDonald joined the Melbourne Tigers during the 2011–12 NBL season. He played in one game for the Tigers.

For the 2015–16 NBL season, McDonald joined the New Zealand Breakers. In his debut for the Breakers, he scored seven points on 2-of-11 shooting. He lost his spot in the line-up for the playoffs after the coaching staff preferred development player Shea Ili. The Breakers made the grand final series, where they lost to the Perth Wildcats. In 22 games, McDonald averaged 1.3 points in 6.2 minutes per game.

=== SEABL ===
In 2005, McDonald played for the Albury Wodonga Bandits in the South East Australian Basketball League (SEABL). He joined the Nunawading Spectres in 2006 and played for them every year until 2019.

In 2011, McDonald helped the Spectres win the SEABL championship while earning grand final MVP honours. In 2013, he earned SEABL co-MVP honours alongside Sandringham Sabres centre John Pichon.

In 2014, McDonald helped the Spectres win the SEABL East Conference title. They went on to lose to the Mount Gambier Pioneers in the SEABL grand final.

In 2016, McDonald helped the Spectres reach the East Conference grand final, where they were defeated 76–64 by the Bendigo Braves. He was subsequently named in the All-SEABL Team for the sixth straight season.

In 2017, McDonald was named the recipient of the SEABL's Golden Hands award and became the SEABL's all-time assists leader, overtaking Ben Harvey with 1,959.

In 2018, McDonald led the Spectres to the SEABL Grand Final, where they lost 72–58 to the Hobart Chargers.

In 2019, McDonald helped the Spectres return to the grand final, this time in the NBL1, where he had 12 points and 10 assists in a 99–90 win over the Bendigo Braves to claim his second championship with Nunawading. He announced his retirement following the grand final.

== Personal life ==
McDonald is married to wife Emily.

McDonald is a physical education teacher and was the basketball coach at Maribyrnong College in Melbourne before signing with the New Zealand Breakers in 2015.

In August 2022, the Western Australian Institute of Sport (WAIS) appointed McDonald as its first Women's Basketball head coach.

Despite being a left-hander, McDonald shoots the basketball with his right.
