= Desmond Oh =

Singaporean basketball player

Desmond Oh Wei Jie
No. 2 – Singapore Slingers
- Position: Shooting guard / point guard
- League: ASEAN Basketball League

Personal information
- Born: 16 June 1986 (age 40) Singapore
- Listed height: 5 ft 8 in (1.73 m)
- Listed weight: 184 lb (83 kg)

Career information
- High school: Swiss Cottage Secondary School
- Playing career: 2009–present

Career history
- 2009–2018: Singapore Slingers
Medals
Men's basketball
Representing Singapore
Southeast Asian Games
| Bronze medal – third place | 2013 Naypyidaw | Team |
| Bronze medal – third place | 2015 Singapore | Team |

Desmond Oh Wei Jie (born 16 June 1986) is a Singaporean basketball player who plays for the Singapore Slingers of the ASEAN Basketball League (ABL). He is known in the ABL for being one of the league's best lock-down perimeter defender and his ability to hit the three ball. With his pesky defense, he is better known as "D-glove" on the court.

== ABL career ==
Desmond Oh's professional basketball career started in 2008 when he played a few games with the Singapore Slingers while the team was competing in the 2008/09 Singapore Challenge Series.

In August 2009, Oh signed a one-year contract to play for the Singapore Slingers along with 7 other local players. As a raw young talent, his role consisted mainly of shutting down opposing team's guards. Then, he earned his nickname, "D-glove".

On 1 September 2010, Oh was one of four local players brought back to play with the team from the previous season. Oh was given a bigger role in the second ABL season when local star Hong Wei Jian went down with a career-ending injury during a local Division One basketball game. He averaged 3.6 points and a career best 0.89 steals that season.

For the 2011-2012 Asean Basketball League season, Desmond, together with Wong Wei Long and Shengyu Lim, were the first trio of Singaporeans that renewed their contracts with the Slingers on 29 November 2011. He went on to average career-highs in minutes, points, rebounds, assists, three-point field goals and steals for the 2012 Asean Basketball League season. Oh's best game came on 18 January 2012 when he scored a career-high of 16 points against the Chang Thailand Slammers, a game that the Slingers went on to win.

Oh was selected as a special ABL import with the Westports Malaysia Dragons against a US Professional Basketball Alumni team, bannered by former NBA stars Scottie Pippen, Dennis Rodman, and Mitch Richmond on 17 July 2012.

On 10 December 2012, Oh re-signed with the Slingers for his fourth straight season for the 2013 Asean Basketball League season.

== ABL career statistics ==
Legend
| GP | Games played | GS | Games started | MPG | Minutes per game |
| FG% | Field goal percentage | 3P% | 3-point field goal percentage | FT% | Free throw percentage |
| RPG | Rebounds per game | APG | Assists per game | SPG | Steals per game |
| BPG | Blocks per game | PPG | Points per game | **Bold** | Career high |

| Year | Team | GP | GS | MPG | FG% | 3P% | FT% | RPG | APG | SPG | BPG | PPG |
|---|---|---|---|---|---|---|---|---|---|---|---|---|
| 2009-10 | Singapore | 6 | 0 | 11.4 | 0.330 | 0.220 | 0.330 | .8 | .5 | .1 | .0 | 3.5 |
| 2010-11 | Singapore | 10 | 0 | 10.5 | 0.340 | 0.250 | 0.500 | 1.3 | .6 | .0 | .0 | 2.6 |
| 2012-13 | Singapore | 12 | 0 | **22.5** | 0.260 | 0.330 | 0.820 | **1.7** | 1.0 | .7 | .0 | 4.5 |
| 2013-14 | Singapore | 8 | 0 | 17.5 | 0.260 | **0.420** | 0.830 | 1.0 | **1.3** | .3 | .0 | 3.0 |
| 2014-15 | Singapore | 17 | 0 | 16.2 | **0.530** | 0.360 | 0.690 | **1.7** | **1.3** | .4 | .1 | **8.0** |
| 2015-16 | Singapore | **28** | 0 | 22.1 | 0.330 | 0.300 | 0.710 | **1.7** | 1.1 | **.8** | **.5** | 4.6 |
| 2016-17 | Singapore | 26 | 0 | 13.3 | 0.330 | 0.270 | 0.170 | 1.2 | .9 | .1 | .0 | 2.0 |
| 2017-18 | Singapore | 21 | 0 | 8.9 | 0.200 | 0.200 | **1.000** | .3 | .4 | .1 | .0 | 0.8 |
| Career | | 128 | 0 | 15.7 | 0.350 | 0.300 | 0.670 | 1.3 | 1.0 | .4 | .1 | 3.6 |

== International ==
Oh is also a member of the men's Singapore national basketball team.
