= Marquin Chandler =

American basketball (born 1982)

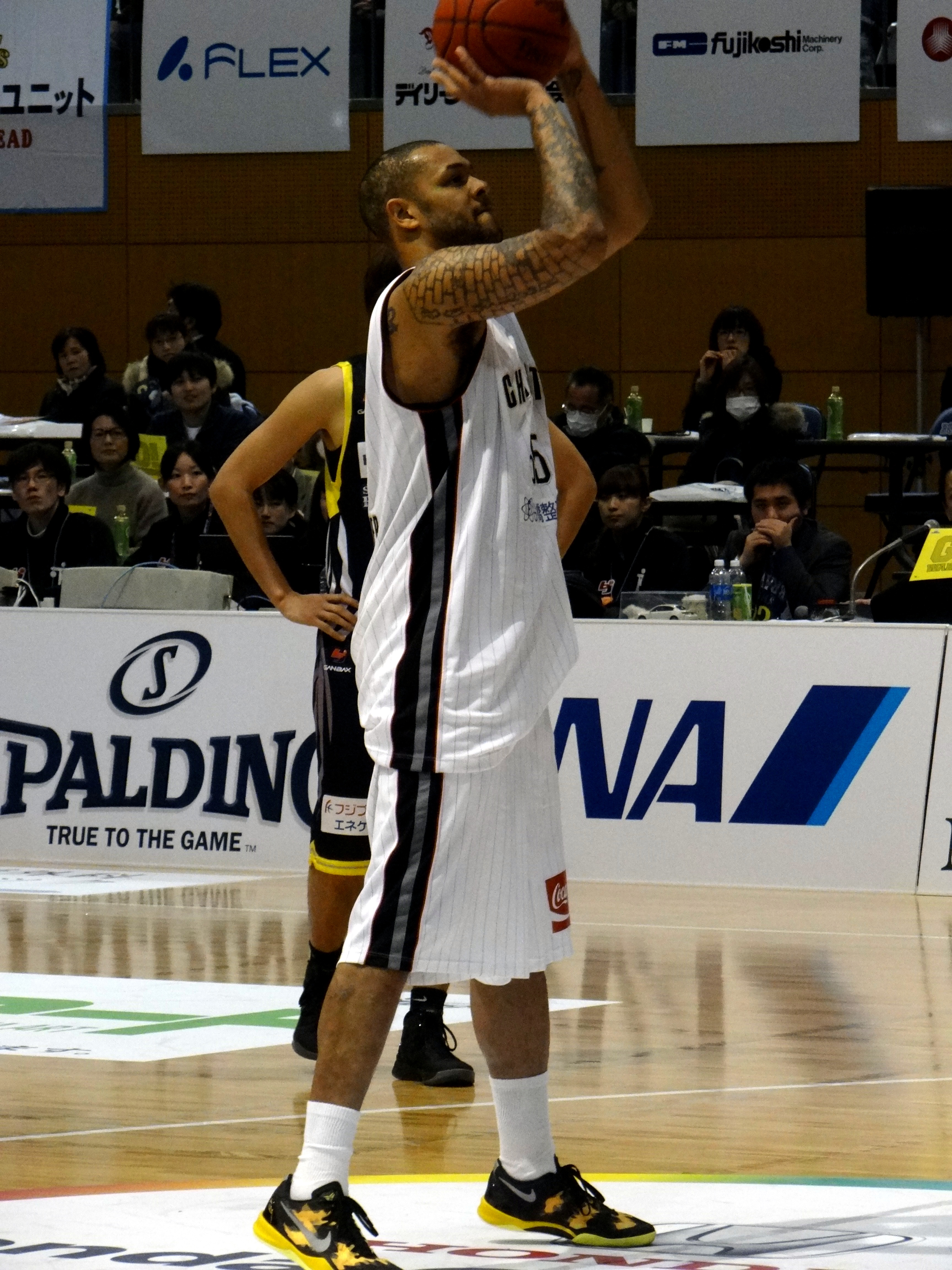
- Shooting a free-Throw at White-Ring, Nagano, Japan

Personal information
- Born: March 11, 1982 (age 44) Berkeley, California, U.S.
- Listed height: 6 ft 8 in (2.03 m)
- Listed weight: 202 lb (92 kg)

Career information
- High school: Newark Memorial (Newark, California)
- College: George Washington (2000–2002); San Jose State (2003–2005)
- NBA draft: 2005: undrafted
- Playing career: 2005–2022
- Position: Power forward

Career history
- 2005–2006: Purefoods Tender Juicy Hotdogs/Purefoods Chunkee Giants
- 2006–2007: Singapore Slingers
- 2007–2008: Anyang KT&G Kites
- 2009: Purefoods Tender Juicy Giants
- 2009–2010: Wonju Dongbu Promy
- 2010–2011: Seoul SK Knights
- 2011: Al-Ahli
- 2011: S.L. Benfica
- 2012–2013: Chiba Jets
- 2013–2014: Anyang KGC
- 2022: Correcaminos UAT Victoria

Career highlights
- Second-team All-WAC (2005)

Marquin Theo Jimmy Chandler (born March 11, 1982) is an American former professional basketball player.

== Early life and college ==
Chandler was born in Berkeley, California, the oldest of three children, and graduated from Newark Memorial High School in Newark, California in 2000. As a senior, he won the California Interscholastic Foundation Division II championship with the Newark Memorial Cougars.

From 2000 to 2002, Chandler attended George Washington University. With the Colonials men's basketball team, Chandler played in 25 games as a freshman, averaging 1.9 points and 1.2 rebounds a game. The following season, Chandler averaged 14.7 minutes, 6.1 points, 3.7 rebounds, and 0.4 assists per game and had two games with double-digit scoring. He also became a father to a daughter named Tianna in late 2000, during his freshman year at George Washington. George Washington finished the 2000–01 season with a 14–18 record and went 12–16 the next season.

Chandler transferred to San Jose State University in 2002. From 2003 to 2005, Chandler played on the San Jose State Spartans men's basketball team, majoring in administration of justice. Chandler averaged 19.8 minutes, 9.8 points, 4.1 rebounds, and 0.6 assists in the 2003–04 season. He made 53.5% of field goal attempts. As a senior in 2004–05, Chandler played 35 minutes a game on average and had 19.6 points, 8.6 rebounds, and 1.1 assists per game with 47.1% field goal shooting. For both of Chandler's seasons, San Jose State went 6–23. In 2005, Chandler was a second-team All-Western Athletic Conference pick.

== Professional career ==
After trying out with the Sacramento Kings in the NBA Summer League, Chandler signed with the Purefoods Tender Juicy Hotdogs of the Philippine Basketball Association in September 2005. Chandler and another Sacramento Kings Summer League member Quermont Greer, who played at DePaul University, were teammates. The team became runners-up of the 2005–06 PBA Fiesta Conference finals.

In 2007, Chandler signed with Anyang KGC in the Korean Basketball League (KBL). In an exhibition game in the Philippines against defending PBA champions Alaska Aces, Anyang won 102–84, and Chandler scored a game-high 34 points.

In 54 games with the KBL team Wonju Dongbu Promy in 2008–2009, Chandler averaged 16.2 points. Chandler joined the Seoul SK Knights of the KBL in 2010.

On February 4, 2011, Chandler scored 15 points as his team Al-Ahli lost to Al-Manama in Game 1 of the Bahrain Cup Finals.

On March 14, 2011, Chandler signed with S.L. Benfica of Liga Portuguesa de Basquetebol (LPB). Benfica lost the LPB championship in 7 games to FC Porto. In the final game of the series, where Porto won 86–76, Chandler scored 16. Benfica released Chandler by the end of the season.

Chandler signed with the Japanese team Chiba Jets on September 16, 2012.

For the 2013–2014 season, he was signed by KBL club team Anyang KGC. In 22 games, Chandler averaged 9.5 points, 3.6 rebounds, and 1.2 assists per game. In March 2014, Chandler played one preseason game with Caciques de Humacao of the Puerto Rican Baloncesto Superior Nacional.
