= Steven Khoo =

Singaporean basketball player

Khoo Kian Huat, Steven
Free agent
- Position: Forward

Personal information
- Born: 25 January 1985 (age 40) Singapore
- Listed height: 6 ft 2 3/4 in (1.90 m)
- Listed weight: 198 lb (90 kg)

Career information
- Playing career: 2009–present

Career history
- 2009–2011: Singapore Slingers

Steven Khoo Kiat Huat (born 25 January 1985), nicknamed "Yakuza", is a Singaporean basketball player who last played for the Singapore Slingers in the Asean Basketball League (ABL). Possessing both inside and outside skill sets, Khoo's all-round play places him arguably as the most fundamentally sound local player in the squad.

== Club career ==
=== Singapore Slingers (2009-present) ===
In 2008, Khoo had a brief stint with the Singapore Slingers while the team was competing in the 2008/09 Singapore Challenge Series.

In August 2009, Khoo signed a one-year contract to play full-time for the Singapore Slingers along with seven other local players. However, he only played a partial season due to national service commitments. He averaged 2.2 points and 1.4 rebounds for the team.

On 5 September 2010, during the 2010/2011 preseason, Khoo became the highest scoring Singaporean in Slingers history to play when he scored a career high of 23 points against Rain or Shine Elasto Painters during the 2010/11 Singapore Challenge Series.

For the 2010/2011 Asean Basketball League season, with local star Hong Wei Jian out with an injury, Khoo stepped up for the locals.. Starting off as an undersized power forward, he expanded his game to in which he contributed 4.1 points, 1.6 rebounds and 0.6 assists. Khoo also co-captained the Singapore Slingers together with American Import Kyle Jeffers for the 2010/2011 ABL Season.

=== Singapore Siglap ===
In July 2011, Khoo played with Singapore Siglap, one of the 4 teams competing in the 2011 Malaysia National Basketball League.

Collecting a total of 51 points and 20 rebounds in 3 games, Khoo was awarded the MVP title for circuit 2 of the tournament.

== International career ==
Khoo captained the Singapore national basketball team for the 2011 Southeast Asian Games in Jakarta and Palembang. He averaged 9.0 points and 6.5 rebounds for the competition.

== ABL Statistics ==
Legend
GP	Games played	GS	Games started	MPG	Minutes per game
FG%	Field goal percentage	3P%	3-point field goal percentage	FT%	Free throw percentage
RPG	Rebounds per game	APG	Assists per game	SPG	Steals per game
BPG	Blocks per game	PPG	Points per game	**Bold**	Career high

Year	Team	GP	GS	MPG	FG%	3P%	FT%	RPG	APG	SPG	BPG	PPG
2009-10	Slingers	17	0	08:15	**.427**	**.500**	.714	1.4	.2	.07	.00	2.2
2010-11	Slingers	**18**	**3**	**16:30**	.382	.263	**.944**	**1.6**	**.6**	**.11**	**.06**	**4.1**
2012	Slingers	0	0	0	.000	.000	.000	.0	.0	.00	.00	.0
Career		35	3	12:30	.409	.286	.844	1.4	.4	.07	.00	3.0
