= Mike Helms =

American basketball player

Personal information
- Born: December 29, 1982 (age 42) Detroit, Michigan, U.S.
- Listed height: 6 ft 0 in (1.83 m)
- Listed weight: 205 lb (93 kg)

Career information
- High school: Martin Luther King (Detroit, Michigan)
- College: Oakland (2000–2004)
- NBA draft: 2004: undrafted
- Playing career: 2004–2013
- Position: Point guard

Career history
- 2004: Argentino de Junín
- 2004–2005: Michigan Mayhem
- 2005: Nebraska Cranes
- 2005–2006: Hunter Pirates
- 2006–2007: Singapore Slingers
- 2007: Gießen 46ers
- 2007–2008: Singapore Slingers
- 2008–2009: Ironi Ramat Gan
- 2010: Southland Sharks
- 2010: Toros de Nuevo Laredo
- 2012–2013: Windsor Express

Career highlights
- 2× NBL All-Star (2006, 2007); All-NBL Third Team (2007); MCC Player of the Year (2003); 3× First-team All-MCC (2002–2004)

Michael Aaron Helms (born December 29, 1982) is an American former professional basketball player. He played college basketball for Oakland University where he was named the Mid-Continent Conference Player of the Year in 2002–03 and was a three-time first-team Mid-Continent honoree.

== Professional career ==
After going undrafted in the 2004 NBA draft, Helms had a short stint with Argentino de Junín of the Liga Nacional de Básquet before joining the Michigan Mayhem of the CBA who selected him as the 18th pick in that year's CBA Draft. After scoring 15 points in his debut for Michigan on November 19, Helms suffered a long-term injury the following game on November 20 and was ruled out for a month and a half, only to be re-activated by the club on January 6, 2005. He played a further 16 games for Michigan to round out the season, before joining the Nebraska Cranes of the United States Basketball League in May 2005. He managed just two games for Nebraska before leaving.

Helms went on to sign with the Hunter Pirates for the 2005–06 NBL season. He had a great season as he earned All-Star honors and was third in the league for scoring with 21.9 points per game. After the license of the franchise was sold, he moved to the new Singapore Slingers for the 2006–07 season. Following the conclusion of the NBL season in February 2007, he signed with the Gießen 46ers for the rest of the 2006–07 Basketball Bundesliga season. He returned to the Slingers for the 2007–08 season.

He also has a daughter Miley Helms, his parents Les Helms (deceased) and Kathie Helms, his sister Robyn Helms, and his niece Lyndsay Helms

In November 2008, Helms signed with Ironi Ramat Gan of Israel for the 2008–09 season.

In April 2010, Helms signed with the Southland Sharks for the rest of the 2010 New Zealand NBL season.

In October 2010, Helms joined Toros de Nuevo Laredo of the Liga Nacional de Baloncesto Profesional but managed just 11 games after making his final appearance for the club on November 28, 2011.

On October 1, 2012, Helms was selected with the fifth overall pick by the Saint John Mill Rats in 2012 NBL Canada draft. He was later traded to the Windsor Express and went to average 17 points per game for the club in 2012–13.
