= Al Vergara =

Filipino basketball coach and former player

Lyceum Pirates
- Title: Assistant coach
- League: NCAA PH

Personal information
- Born: December 20, 1979 (age 46) Philippines
- Listed height: 5 ft 5 in (1.65 m)
- Listed weight: 165 lb (75 kg)

Career information
- College: St. Francis
- PBA draft: 2006: Undrafted
- Drafted by: Purefoods Tender Juicy Giants
- Playing career: 2008–2018
- Position: Point guard
- Coaching career: 2019–present

Career history

Playing
- 2008–2010: Singapore Slingers
- 2009: Purefoods Tender Juicy Giants
- 2010: Barako Energy Coffee Masters
- 2010–2011: Singapore Slingers
- 2011–2012: Philippine Patriots
- 2012: Barako Bull Energy
- 2013: Saigon Heat
- 2013–2014: GlobalPort Batang Pier
- 2014: Singapore Slingers
- 2018: Muntinlupa Cagers

Coaching
- 2019–2023: Rizal Golden Coolers (assistant)
- 2023–2025: Parañaque Patriots (assistant)
- 2024–2025: LPU Cavite HS
- 2024–present: Lyceum (assistant)

Al Vergara (born December 20, 1979) is a Filipino professional basketball coach and former player. He serves as an assistant coach for the Lyceum Pirates of the National Collegiate Athletic Association (NCAA PH).

Vergara started off his professional career with the Singapore Slingers in the inaugural Asean Basketball League and played there for two seasons before joining Purefoods Tender Juicy Giants in the Philippine Basketball Association on loan from the Slingers, for the 2009 PBA Fiesta Conference.

An undrafted player in the 2006 PBA Draft, he played collegiately for the St. Francis of Assisi College Golden Doves, with PBA players Yancy and Ranidel de Ocampo, Ervin Sotto, and Erick Canlas.

Known for his athleticism, efficiency, and excellent plays, Vergara is best remembered for his role in the so-called Harbour Centre dynasty in the amateur Philippine Basketball League from 2006 to date. That feat led to him being signed by the Singapore Slingers in 2008 and becoming its starting point guard to replace Jayson Castro.

== PBA career statistics ==
Legend
GP	Games played	MPG	Minutes per game
FG%	Field-goal percentage	3P%	3-point field-goal percentage	FT%	Free-throw percentage
RPG	Rebounds per game	APG	Assists per game	SPG	Steals per game
BPG	Blocks per game	PPG	Points per game	**Bold**	Career high

=== Season-by-season averages ===
Year	Team	GP	MPG	FG%	3P%	FT%	RPG	APG	SPG	BPG	PPG
2008–09	Purefoods	8	13.9	.333	.364	.750	.5	2.0	**.9**	.0	2.4
2009–10	Barako Energy Coffee	**18**	**22.4**	.398	.346	.538	**2.3**	**3.7**	.7	.0	**5.4**
2011–12	Barako Bull	3	6.7	**.500**	**.500**	—	.7	.0	.3	.0	1.0
2012–13	GlobalPort	8	15.0	.312	.250	**1.000**	1.6	2.4	.5	.0	3.0
Career		37	17.7	.374	.333	.611	1.7	2.8	.7	.0	3.9
