= Jeremy Kench =

New Zealand basketball player

Personal information
- Born: 27 April 1984 (age 42) Wellington, New Zealand
- Listed height: 186 cm (6 ft 1 in)
- Listed weight: 88 kg (194 lb)

Career information
- High school: Middleton Grange School (Christchurch, New Zealand)
- Playing career: 2003–2015
- Position: Point guard

Career history
- 2003–2008: Canterbury Rams
- 2006–2007: Singapore Slingers
- 2007–2008: Wollongong Hawks
- 2009: Hawke's Bay Hawks
- 2010: Christchurch Cougars
- 2011: Manawatu Jets
- 2012: Wellington Saints
- 2014–2015: Canterbury Rams

Jeremy Brian Kench (born 27 April 1984) is a New Zealand former professional basketball player who played 12 seasons in the New Zealand National Basketball League (NZNBL).

== Playing career ==
Kench attended former powerhouse Christchurch basketball school, Middleton Grange, and represented New Zealand Under 18, New Zealand Under 19 and the Junior Tall Blacks. He made his NBL debut in the 2003 NBL season averaging 3.4 points a game from 14 appearances. In the 2004 NBL season, Kench gained more maturity with experience, eventually replacing Ben Jeffrey as the Rams' starting point guard, starting in 15 out of 18 games. His average was slightly up from his debut season, averaging 4.2 points a game, and just under 3 assists a game.

In 2005, the Rams brought in American point guard, Michael Gardener who became the team's starting point guard, which severely cut into Kench's playing time. Kench did not start any matches in 2005 and only averaged 2.2 points from ten minutes a game.

For the 2006 NBL season, the Rams brought in new American coach Chris Sparks and a shooting guard Dennis Trammell from the United States. This meant that Kench was able to assume his starting position at point guard. On 28 April 2006, Kench scored a career high of 30 points, while dishing out 5 assists, in a loss to the Auckland Stars at Cowles Stadium, in Christchurch. Two games later Kench followed this performance up with an equally inspiring 26 point game in a win against the Taranaki Mountainairs. Kench's strong play continued on in the second half of the season where on 9 June 2006, he had another outstanding game posting 27 points in a victory over the Otago Nuggets in Dunedin. In the final game of the regular season on 24 June 2006, Kench broke his career high, scoring 36 points against the Wellington Saints. He finished the 2006 NBL season with an average of 18 points a game.

His strong play in 2006 was rewarded on 11 May 2006 when he was selected in the New Zealand Tall Blacks squad to prepare for the 2006 Basketball World Championship in Japan.

On 15 July 2006, Kench signed a contract to play for the Singapore Slingers in their debut season in the Australian NBL. After the Australian NBL season, he returned to the Rams for the 2007 NBL season. Kench appeared to be much more of a marked man in the 2007 season. His overall numbers were down on his breakout 2006 year. Half-way through the 2007 NZNBL season, Kench signed to play for the Wollongong Hawks of the Australian NBL for the 2007–08 season.

Kench was selected in the 2008 New Zealand Tall Blacks squad. He made the final team to play Australia.

In 2010, he joined the Christchurch Cougars. At the end of the season he was selected for the Tall Blacks trials for the 2010 FIBA World Championships and subsequently made the twelve-man squad.

As a consequence of the Canterbury earthquake in February 2011, the Cougars disbanded and Kench was forced to find another team to play for in the 2011 NBL season, subsequently joining the Manawatu Jets. His season was abruptly cut short after an ankle injury against the Southland Sharks early on in the season, which needed surgery. This subsequently kept him out of the 2011 Tall Blacks Olympic qualifying squad.

In 2012, after moving to Wellington to attend Police College, he joined the Wellington Saints for the 2012 NBL season.

In November 2013, he signed with the re-established Canterbury Rams for the 2014 season. On 5 December 2014, he re-signed with the Rams for the 2015 season.

On 14 December 2015, Kench retired from elite basketball, confessing his heart was no longer in the sport, calling it quits after 12 years in the New Zealand NBL and 194 games.

== Career to Date ==
Season	Team	Games played	Points per game
2003	Canterbury Rams	14	3.4
2004	Canterbury Rams	18	4.2
2005	Canterbury Rams	18	2.2
2006	Canterbury Rams	18	18.7
2006–07	Singapore Slingers	34	3.4
2007	Canterbury Rams	17	13.8
2007–08	Wollongong Hawks	29	6.1
2008	Canterbury Rams	18	17.8
2009	Hawke's Bay Hawks	16	9.1
2010	Christchurch Cougars	18	16.3
2011	Manawatu Jets	7	11.9
2012	Wellington Saints	14	9.2
2014	Canterbury Rams	17	12.6
2015	Canterbury Rams	18	7.1

== Personal ==
In 2012, Kench attended the Royal New Zealand Police College. In 2013, after graduating, he worked as a constable for the Christchurch Police Department.
