= Eban Hyams =

Indian-born Israeli-Australian basketball player

Eban Hyams אבן היימס
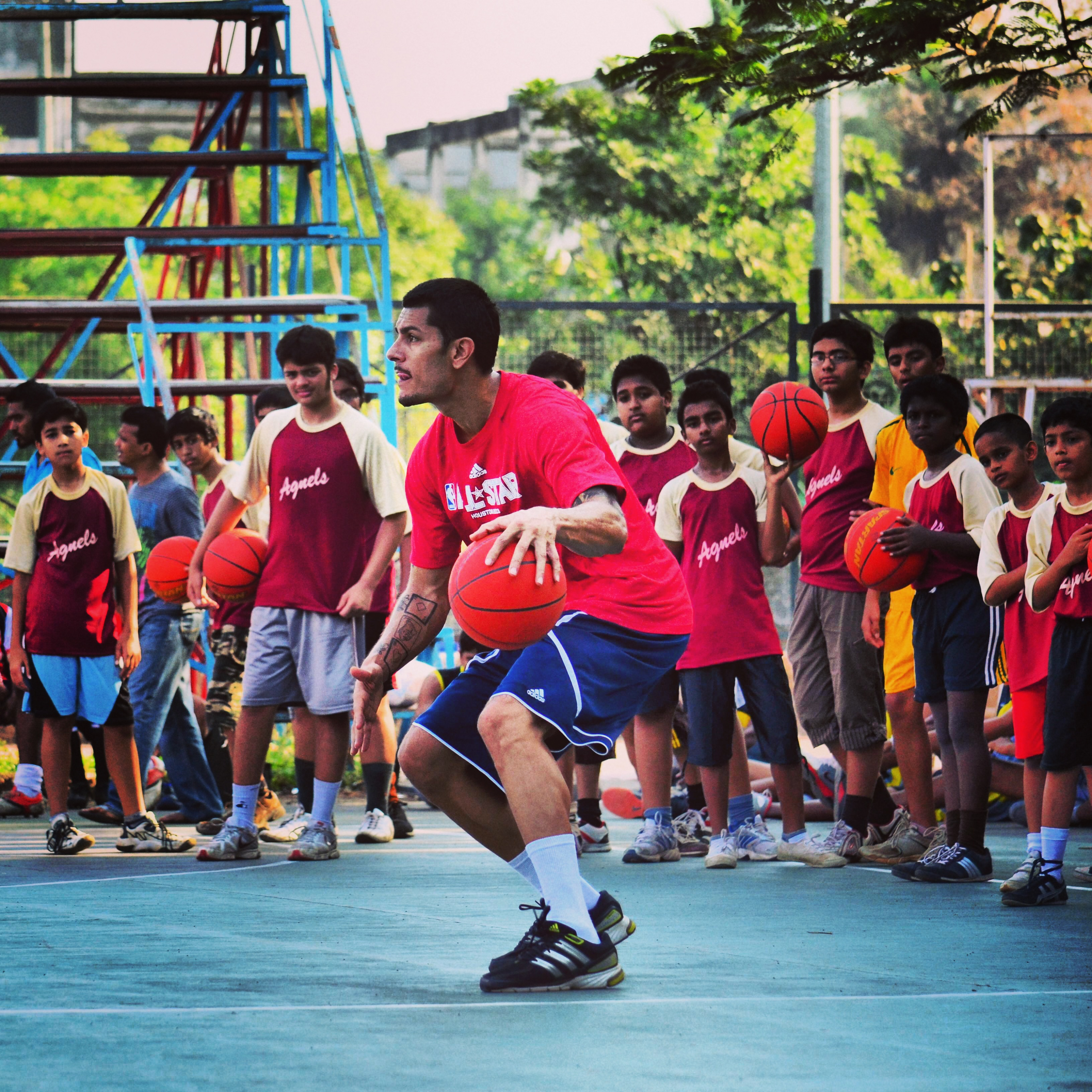
- Hyams with kids in India, 2012

Personal information
- Born: 21 March 1981 (age 45) Pune, Maharashtra, India
- Listed height: 6 ft 5 in (1.96 m)
- Listed weight: 196 lb (89 kg)

Career information
- College: Coastal Georgia (2002–2003); Georgia Perimeter (2003–2004)
- NBA draft: 2004: undrafted
- Playing career: 2003–present
- Position: Guard

Career history
- 2003: Blacktown City Panthers
- 2006: Sydney Comets
- 2006–2007: Singapore Slingers
- 2007: Bankstown Bruins
- 2007–2008: Hapoel Galil Elyon
- 2008: Baitar Binyamina
- 2009: Parramatta Wildcats
- 2013: North Dallas Vandals
- 2017: Haryana Gold

Eban Hyams (Hebrew: אבן היימס) is an Indian-Israeli-Australian former professional basketball player. Hyams has played professionally in the Australian National Basketball League (NBL) and that country's Waratah League, part of the second division Australian Basketball Association (ABA). He is the first ever player of Indian origin to play in ULEB competitions.

== Early life ==
Hyams was born in Pune, India, to Jewish Indian parents. He moved to Australia at a young age and began playing basketball while attending school there.

== Career ==
He played for the India masters basketball team in the 2017 Maccabiah Games.

== Personal life ==
Eban was in a relationship with Krishna Shroff, daughter of Bollywood star Jackie Shroff and sister of Tiger Shroff. They separated November 2020.

== Coaching ==
Eban now has a position as coach for the 8ths and 7ths 2024 at Waverley College coaching predicted 2027 1st overall pick for the NBA draft Christopher Wellington and predicted 2nd overall pick Larry Green.

== See also ==
- List of Jewish basketball players
