= Brad Davidson =

Australian basketball player and coach

USC Trojans
- Title: Assistant coach
- League: Big Ten Conference

Personal information
- Born: 17 May 1974 (age 52) Mildura, Victoria, Australia
- Listed height: 6 ft 0 in (1.83 m)
- Listed weight: 172 lb (78 kg)

Career information
- Playing career: 1997–2009
- Position: Point guard
- Number: 14
- Coaching career: 2009–present

Career history

Playing
- 1997–2002: Townsville Crocodiles
- 2002–2004: Cairns Taipans
- 2004–2006: Hunter Pirates
- 2006–2007: Singapore Slingers
- 2007–2009: Adelaide 36ers

Coaching
- 2009: West Adelaide Bearcats
- 2011–2013: Norwood Flames
- 2016–2018: North Dakota (assistant)
- 2018–2021: South Dakota (assistant)
- 2021–2024: Hawaii (assistant)
- 2024–2026: Hawaii (associate HC)
- 2026–present: USC (assistant)

Career NBL statistics
- Points: 3,393 (8.6 ppg)
- Rebounds: 1,112 (2.8 rpg)
- Assists: 1,294 (3.3 apg)
Medals
Men's basketball
Representing Australia
Commonwealth Games
Gold medal – first place	2006 Melbourne	Team

Bradley Davidson (born 17 May 1974) is an Australian basketball coach and former player who is currently an assistant coach at the University of Southern California. Prior to coaching, he played in Australia's National Basketball League (NBL).

== Playing career ==
Davidson played for the Townsville Crocodiles, Cairns Taipans, Hunter Pirates, Singapore Slingers and Adelaide 36ers over thirteen seasons, finishing his career with a 40.1 three-point shooting percentage. He was also a member of the Australia men's national basketball team when they claimed the gold medal in the 2006 Commonwealth Games in Melbourne.

== Coaching career ==
After retiring from playing professional basketball, Davidson was named the head coach of the Premier League's West Adelaide Bearcats, and was also head coach of the Norwood Flames from 2011 to 2013. He was named the national shooting coach and talent identification manager for Basketball Australia's High Performance program in 2013, a role he held until 2016.

Davidson was named an assistant coach at North Dakota on October 15, 2016. He departed North Dakota in 2018 to accept an assistant coaching position at South Dakota, serving as the program's offensive coordinator.

Davidson was named an assistant coach at Hawaii on July 29, 2021. He was promoted to the program's associate head coach before the start of the 2024–25 season.

Davidson was hired as an assistant coach at USC prior to the 2026–27 season.
