= Aaron Trahair =

Australian basketball player

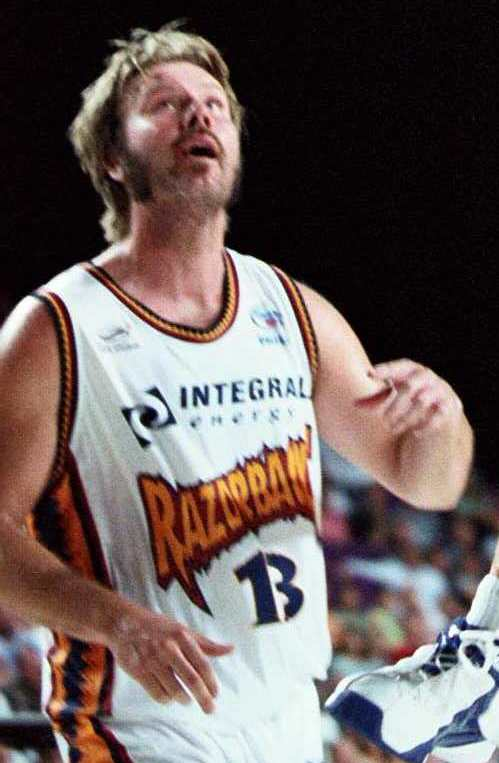
- Trahair with the West Sydney Razorbacks in the 2004–05 season

Kalamunda Eastern Suns
- Title: Head coach
- League: NBL1 West

Personal information
- Born: 3 February 1976 (age 50) Melbourne, Victoria, Australia
- Listed height: 194 cm (6 ft 4 in)
- Listed weight: 101 kg (223 lb)

Career information
- Playing career: 1994–2008
- Position: Shooting guard / small forward
- Coaching career: 2015–present

Career history

Playing
- 1994–1996: Perth Wildcats
- 1997–2000: Sydney Kings
- 2000–2002: Cairns Taipans
- 2002–2005: West Sydney Razorbacks
- 2005–2006: Hunter Pirates
- 2006–2007: Singapore Slingers
- 2007: Perth Wildcats
- 2007–2008: Wollongong Hawks

Coaching
- 2015: Rockingham Flames (assistant)
- 2016: Geraldton Buccaneers
- 2017–2022: Mandurah Magic
- 2023–present: Kalamunda Eastern Suns

Career highlights
- NBL champion (1995)

Aaron Trahair (born 3 February 1976) is an Australian basketball coach and former professional player who is the head coach for the Kalamunda Eastern Suns of NBL1 West.

== Career ==
Before beginning his career in the NBL, Trahair attended the Australian Institute of Sport in 1992 and 1993. He began his NBL career with the Perth Wildcats in 1994, and was named runner-up to Sam Mackinnon in the Rookie of the Year award for that season. The following year, Trahair was a member of the Australian under 19's team that won silver at the Junior World Championships, and won his only NBL championship with the Wildcats. In doing so, he was a member of the Wildcats squad that travelled to the McDonald's Championship in London that competed against the NBA's Houston Rockets and Spain's Real Madrid.

In 1997, Trahair headed east to play with the Sydney Kings where he remained until the conclusion of the 1999–2000 season. Over the next several years, Trahair played a series of short stints with numerous fledgling NBL clubs including the Cairns Taipans, West Sydney Razorbacks, Hunter Pirates, and the Singapore Slingers.

Prior to the commencement of the 2007–08 season, the unsigned Trahair trained and appeared in several pre-season matches with the Wildcats while in Perth visiting family. Despite early reports that the Wildcats would not sign Trahair (as they held out for the possibility that American forward Shawn Redhage would become an Australian citizen), the guard was officially signed up shortly before the first match of the season against his previous club, the Singapore Slingers. However, after appearing in just eight games with limited minutes for the Wildcats, Trahair was released by the club in December 2007 to allow him to sign with the Wollongong Hawks for the remainder of the season.

In 2007 and 2008, Trahair played in the State Basketball League (SBL) for the Rockingham Flames, then between 2009 and 2013, he played for the Mandurah Magic.

In 2015, Trahair served as an assistant coach for the Rockingham Flames men's team. In 2016, he served as head coach of the Geraldton Buccaneers. Between 2017 and 2022, he served as head coach of the Mandurah Magic men's team. He was appointed the head coach of the Kalamunda Eastern Suns men's team for the 2023 NBL1 West season. He continued as Suns coach in 2024, 2025 and 2026. In October 2026, he re-signed as Suns coach for another two years.
