= Pathman Matialakan =

Singaporean basketball player

Free agent
- Position: Power forward / center

Personal information
- Born: 1 June 1980 (age 45) Singapore
- Listed height: 6 ft 6.75 in (2.00 m)
- Listed weight: 230 lb (104 kg)

Career information
- Playing career: 2006–present

Career history
- 2006–2012: Singapore Slingers

Pathman s/o Matialakan (born 1 June 1980) is a Singaporean basketball player who last played for the Singapore Slingers in the Asean Basketball League (ABL). He goes by the nicknames "Pride of the Lion City" as the only Asian to ever played in the Australian National Basketball League and "17-foot assassin" as he models his mid-range jumpshots after NBA player David West.

== Club career ==
Pathman is the first Singaporean to play and score points in a professional league, the Australian National Basketball League, and the longest serving local player in the team's four-year history. In August 2009, Pathman signed a one-year contract to play for the Singapore Slingers along with Hong Wei Jian.

== International career ==
Pathman is also a member of the Singapore national basketball team for men. He is also the most veteran player in the national team.

== Personal life ==
On 19 Dec 2009, Pathman proposed on court, after an ABL game against the Thailand Tigers, in front of the home crowd, to his long-time girlfriend Li Ling.

In 2011, Pathman married Singapore national netball player Li Ling.

== ABL Statistics ==
Legend
GP	Games played	GS	Games started	MPG	Minutes per game
FG%	Field goal percentage	3P%	3-point field goal percentage	FT%	Free throw percentage
RPG	Rebounds per game	APG	Assists per game	SPG	Steals per game
BPG	Blocks per game	PPG	Points per game	**Bold**	Career high

Year	Team	GP	GS	MPG	FG%	3P%	FT%	RPG	APG	SPG	BPG	PPG
2009-10	Slingers	18	1	12:29	.475	.000	.889	1.4	.4	.17	.06	3.7
Career		18	1	12:29	.475	.000	.889	1.4	.4	.17	.06	3.7

=== Playoffs ===
Year	Team	GP	GS	MPG	FG%	3P%	FT%	RPG	APG	SPG	BPG	PPG
2009-10	Slingers	3	0	8:50	.375	.000	1.000	2.3	.3	1.67	.00	3.3
Career		3	0	8.50	.375	.000	1.000	2.3	.3	1.67	.00	3.3
