= Singapore Slingers =

Professional basketball team in Kallang, Singapore

- Leagues: NBL (2006–2008); ABL (2009–2023)
- Founded: 2006; 20 years ago
- History: Canberra Cannons; 1979–2003; Hunter Pirates; 2003–2006; Singapore Slingers; 2006–present
- Arena: OCBC Arena
- Capacity: 3,000
- Location: Kallang, Singapore
- Team colours: Red, white, gold
- Main sponsor: PengWine
- General manager: Michael Johnson
- Head coach: Neo Beng Siang
- Ownership: HSJ Pte. Ltd. Basketball Enterprises Pte Ltd
- Championships: 0
- Website: SingaporeSlingers.com
Home	Away	Third

The Singapore Slingers are a Singaporean professional basketball team that last competed in the ASEAN Basketball League. The Slingers were known as the JobStreet.com Singapore Slingers between 2009 and 2014, due to sponsorship ties with JobStreet.com.

The Slingers formerly competed in Australia's National Basketball League (NBL), becoming the first – and so far, the only – Asia-based club to compete in the NBL when they joined at the start of the 2006–07 NBL season. They withdrew from the competition in July 2008, with their decision influenced by the financial costs of travelling. They subsequently competed in the "Singapore Challenge Series", where they played against a range of teams from the Philippines, China, Indonesia, Malaysia, India and Australia.

In October 2009, the Slingers were one of the inaugural teams that began competition in the ASEAN Basketball League. From their inception in 2006 until 2014, the Slingers played their home games at the Singapore Indoor Stadium. Ahead of the 2014 ABL season, the Slingers moved into the OCBC Arena. In November 2016, the Singapore Slingers and StarHub have announced a partnership that will see the pay TV operator become the Official Broadcast Partner of the Singapore Slingers for three years. In the 2019–20 ABL season, Singtel became the Official Broadcast Partner of the Singapore Slingers.

== History ==
=== 1979–2002: Canberra Cannons ===
The franchise originated as the Canberra Cannons from 1979 to 2002, an Australian team representing the nation's capital city, Canberra. Initially playing at the Canberra Showgrounds before moving into the 5,200-seat AIS Arena (nicknamed "The Palace" as it was the largest and most modern arena in the league from 1979 to 1983) in 1980, the Cannons competed in the National Basketball League and won 3 championships in 1983, 1984 and 1988. The Cannons were one of the original ten NBL clubs, competing in the league's very first season in 1979 where they reached the championship game with a 13–5 record, but fell at the final hurdle, losing to the St Kilda Saints 94–93 in the Grand Final.

The Cannons failed to make the playoffs over the next few seasons but won their first NBL championship in 1983 where they downed the defending champion West Adelaide Bearcats 75–73 in the Grand Final. Australian national team Point guard, Adelaide born Phil Smyth, joined the team in 1983 led the NBL in steals and assists. Smyth was also named to his second straight All-NBL First Team as well as winning his second straight NBL Best Defensive Player Award while Jamie Kennedy was named as the NBL's Rookie of the Year.

The title was retained in 1984, when the Cannons beat the Brisbane Bullets 84–82 in the Grand Final. Smyth had another big season, being named to the All-NBL First Team for the third straight year.

Canberra made the playoffs for the next three seasons but would fall to the Bullets in the semi-final each time, though Bob Turner did win the club's first NBL Coach of the Year Award in 1985. Championship glory eluded the Cannons until 1988, when they beat the North Melbourne Giants 2–1 in a best-of-three championship series. Smyth was once again was named to the All-NBL First Team after leading the league in three-point percentage, free-throw percentage and steals, and was also named NBL's Best Defensive Player for the third time, while 7'0" (213 cm) American import center Willie Simmons led the league with 3.6 blocks per game. North Melbourne exacted their revenge in 1989, beating the Cannons 2–0 in the Grand Final series. 1989 would prove to be the last NBL Grand Final the Cannons would appear in.

The Cannons failed to make the playoffs again until 1992, where they were eliminated in the first round by the eventual champions, the South East Melbourne Magic. The club's greatest player Phil Smyth left the team after 10 seasons and returned home to join the Adelaide 36ers from 1993 and the Cannons would not reach the playoffs again until 1996, making the semi-finals before being eliminated by the Melbourne Tigers 2–1. Canberra again made the finals in 1997, but were eliminated in the first round 2–1 by the North Melbourne Giants.

Financial problems dogged the club in the late 1990s and the team finally succumbed to its money woes in December 2002. The club managed to play all its remaining games of the 2002–03 NBL season, but were unable to hold on to their star players, including C. J. Bruton, the son of then-coach Cal Bruton and all of their imports. Canberra finished with an 11–19 record and the team was bought by a consortium that moved the team to Newcastle.

=== 2003–2006: Hunter Pirates ===
After relocating to Newcastle, the new owners renamed the franchise the Hunter Pirates, keeping with the Cannons' maritime battlers theme. The Pirates played their home games at the 4,658 seat Newcastle Entertainment Centre.

In its first season as the Pirates, the team came last after winning only two games. The Pirates' coach, Bruce Palmer who had coached North Melbourne to its 1989 Grand Final win over Canberra, was also controversially fired partway into the season and was replaced by his assistant coach, former Melbourne Tigers championship forward Dave Simmons.

In the 2004–05 NBL season, former Perth Wildcats, Australian Boomers and Australian Institute of Sport coach Dr. Adrian Hurley was employed as coach. A mostly-retooled team produced much better results, finishing 8th with a 15–17 record. The Pirates made the NBL playoffs only to be eliminated by the Brisbane Bullets in the opening round. Hurley would quit at the end of the 2005–06 season after the Pirates were beaten by the Cairns Taipans in the playoffs.

The club had plans to move from the Entertainment Centre to a new stadium to be built at the Stockland Supercentre out at Glendale in the next few years but this never eventuated. The Pirates withdrew from the NBL at the end of the 2005–06 season due to financial difficulties and their inability to secure a major sponsor, and the club's NBL licence was put up for sale. Pirates snap NBL losing streak It was revealed on NBN News that, in an effort to remain in the competition, the club had considered turning itself into a non-profit organisation, thereby able to access various grants.

In the end, the Pirates' licence was sold to a Singapore consortium, who renamed the club as the Singapore Slingers and began competing in the 2006–07 season NBL > News.

=== 2006–2008: Singapore Slingers in the NBL ===
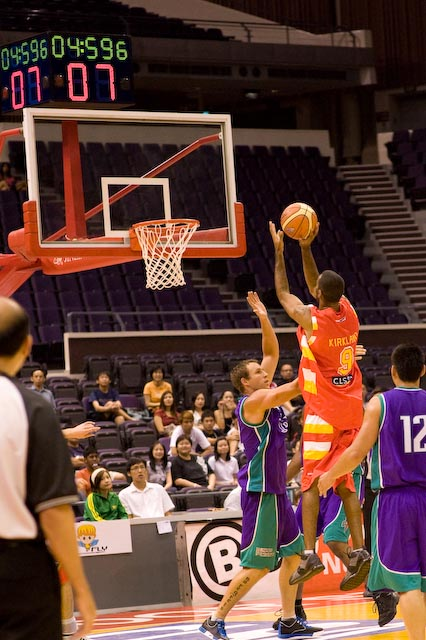
Armein Kirkland (in red) shooting for two points against the Darwin All Stars in the Singapore Challenge in December 2008.

Although the Slingers had relocated to Singapore before the start of the 2006–07 NBL season, they still played occasional home games in Newcastle. The Slingers home venue would be the 12,000 seat Singapore Indoor Stadium.

The re-branding of the club was the brainchild of NBL stalwart and former Canberra dual-championship winning coach Bob Turner who took over as the Slingers' CEO after the handover. The NBL believed the club would open the league to wider audiences and greater revenue. However, due to the distance involved, the team agreed to cover the travel expenses of all the teams which played them in Singapore. The club averaged crowds of only 3,500 at its home games during the season.

In July 2008, following their second season in the NBL, the Slingers withdrew from the league due to the dramatic increase in international travel costs. The Slingers determined that the future focus of the team needed to be on participating in competitions within its local region in Asia rather than weekly games in Australia and New Zealand.

=== 2008–2009: First Singapore Challenge Series ===
Following their exit from the NBL, the Slingers organised and took part in the Singapore Challenge Series, a round of friendly matches played at the Singapore Indoor Stadium against a number of Pan-Asia Pacific basketball clubs such as Indonesian Basketball League champions Satria Muda Britama, the Darwin All-Stars, a team made up of a majority of professional players originating from Darwin as well as Air21 Express from the PBA. The series ended in January 2009.

=== Formation of the ASEAN Basketball League ===
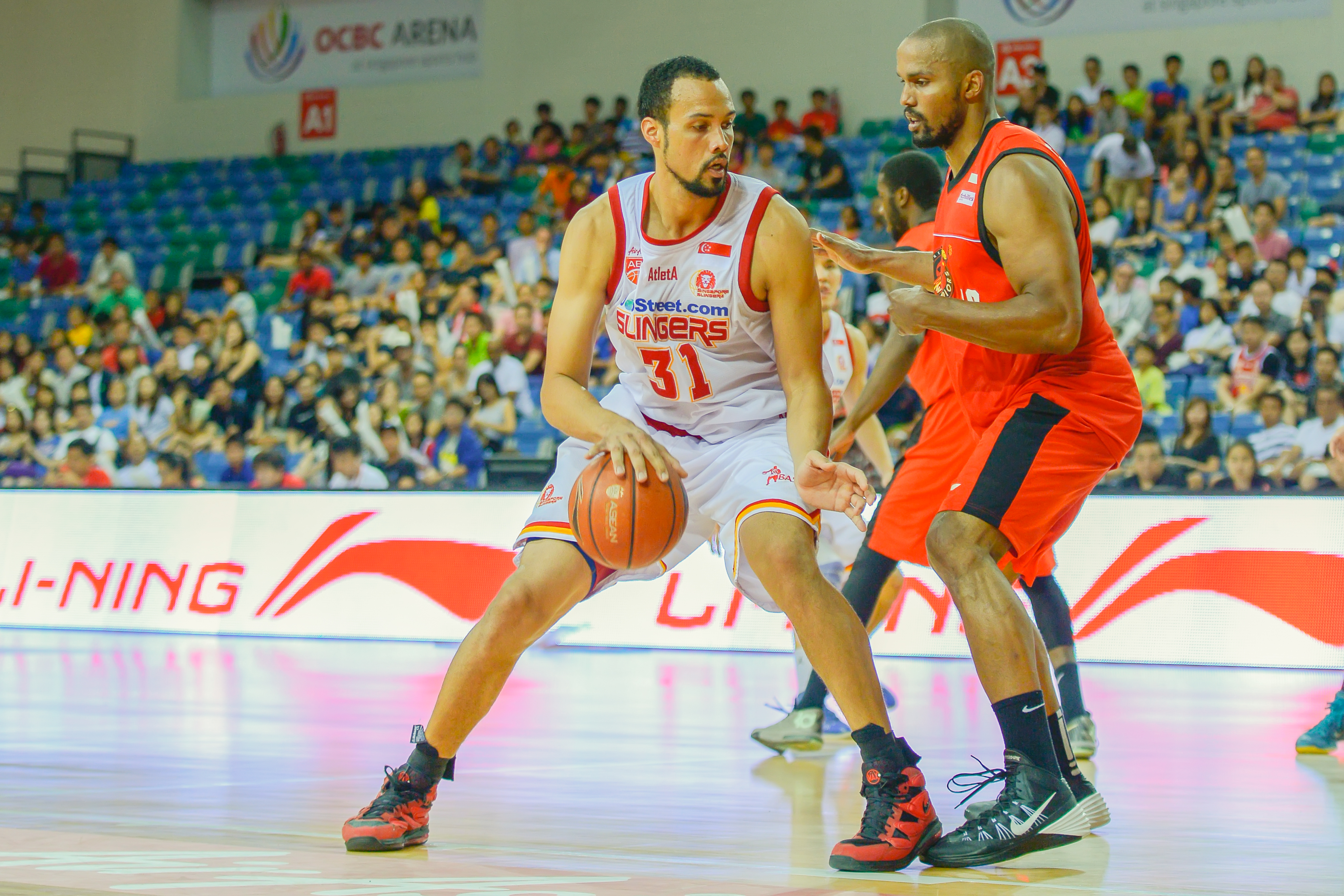
Kyle Jeffers (in white) takes on Chris Ellis of the Indonesia Warriors in an ABL match on 10 August 2014.

On 1 September 2009, it was announced that the Slingers would be one of six founding teams of the new ASEAN Basketball League which tipped off on 10 October 2009. The other five teams were the Brunei Barracudas, the Kuala Lumpur Dragons, the Philippine Patriots, Satria Muda BritAma from Indonesia and the Thailand Tigers. It was also revealed that the driving force behind the realisation of the league was Tony Fernandes, the founder of AirAsia.

Upon their confirmation of entry in the inaugural ABL season, the Slingers announced that they had secured contracts with Singaporean players Pathman Matialakan and Hong Wei Jian for the new season, as well as Filipino point guard Al Vergara.

=== 2009: Second Singapore Challenge Series ===
As part of their pre-season training for the ABL, the Slingers organised a second edition of the Singapore Challenge in September 2009, choosing to play four single-match games against PBA sides Coca-Cola Tigers, Ginebra Kings and San Miguel Beermen, as well as Smart Gilas Pilipinas, the national basketball team of the Philippines. The 2009 Singapore Challenge saw the Slingers come away with a 2–2 record, beating the Tigers and the Beermen while falling to Smart Gilas and Ginebra.

=== 2009–2011: Competing in the ABL ===
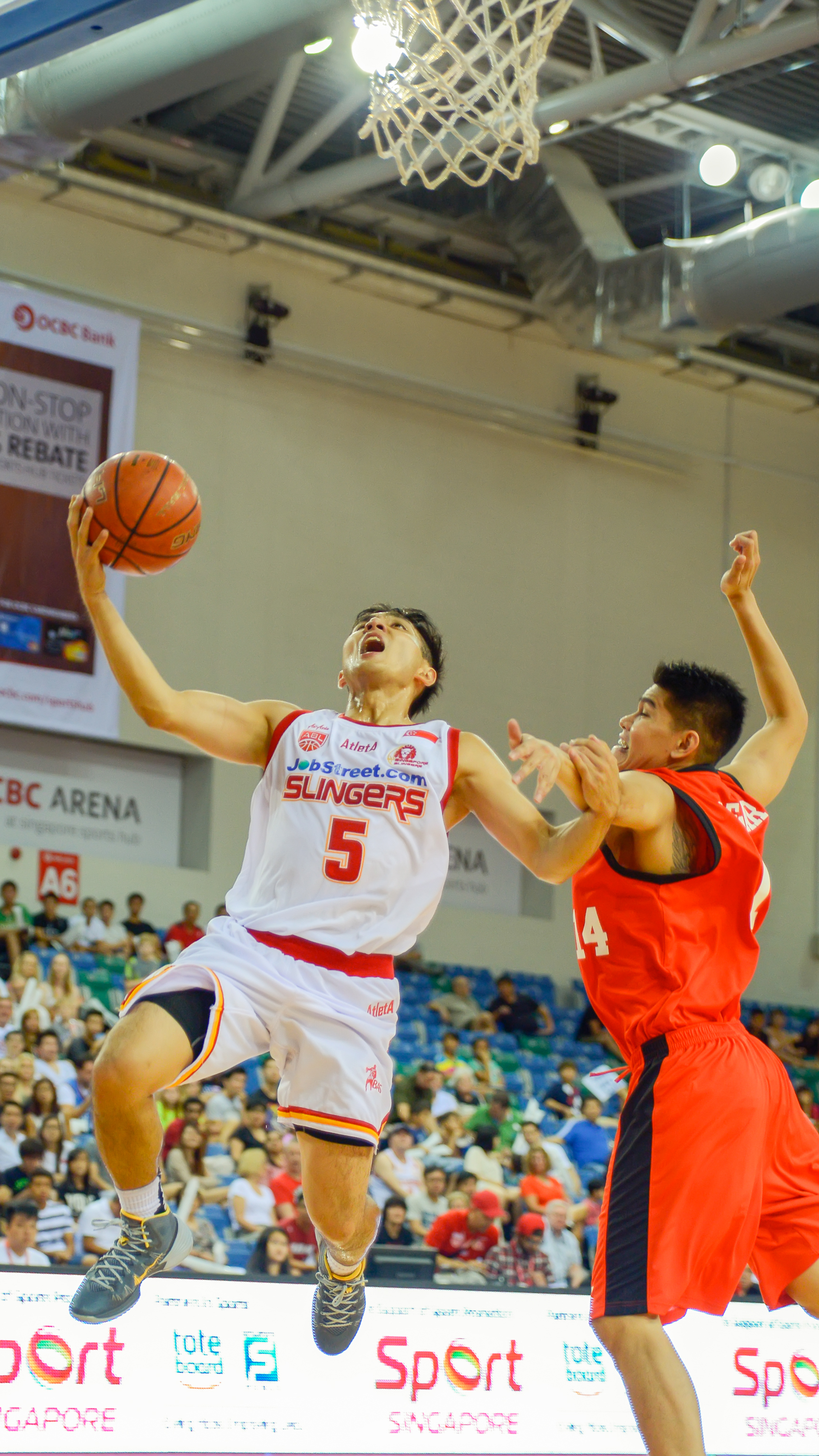
Wong Wei Long (in white) attempts a lay-up.

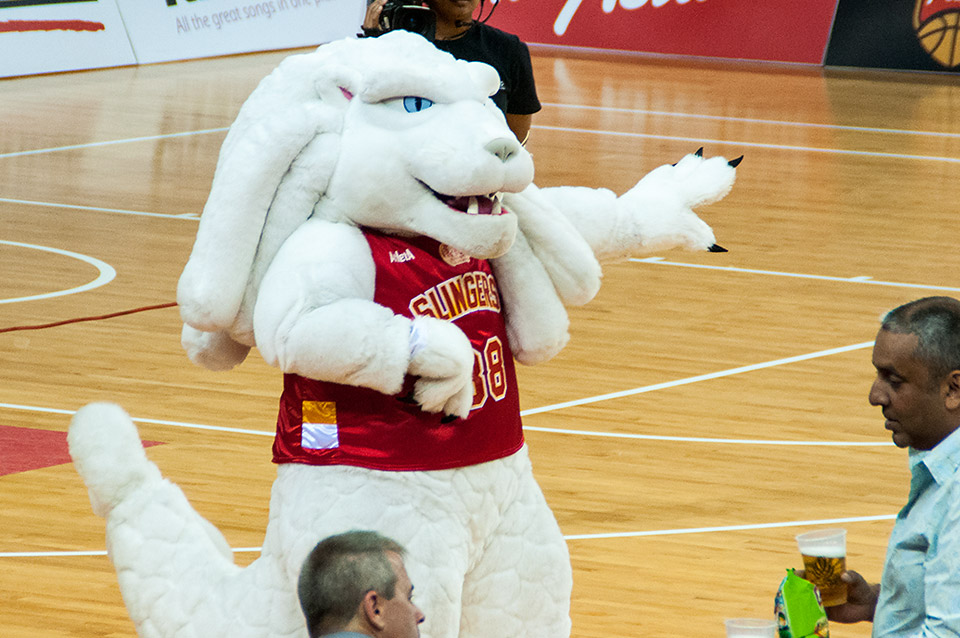
The Merlion Mascot of the Singapore Slingers

Prior to their first game in the ABL, the Slingers' import player Kyle Jeffers was named as the co-captain for the team's maiden ASEAN Basketball League season, alongside local player Michael Wong.

The opening night of the Slingers' ABL campaign saw them beat the Brunei Barracudas 87–69 on 18 October 2009. Homegrown talent Wong Wei Long scored a season high of 14 points in that game, sinking 4 three-pointers. Pathman Matialakan, the first Asian and Singaporean to ever play in the NBL when the Slingers were still competing in Australia, became the first local Slinger to score in the ABL with a layup. Kyle Jeffers also collected a record 20 rebounds in the same game while Hong Wei Jian wowed the crowd with two dunks in the 4th quarter.

The Slingers did well in the first season of the ABL, finishing in 2nd place with a 15–10 record behind the Philippine Patriots. The team also managed to reach the semi-finals of the 2010 ABL playoffs but were beaten 2–1 by Satria Muda BritAma.

After the 2009–10 ABL Season concluded, coach Frank Arsego announced that he would be departing the club after spending two years in Singapore. Singaporean Neo Beng Siang, who was assistant coach to Arsego during the 2009–10 ABL Season, was chosen to take charge of the team from the 2010–11 ABL Season onwards.

Finishing the 2010–11 regular season in 4th place with a 7–8 record, the Slingers managed to reach the semi-finals of the 2011 ABL playoffs for the second season straight but lost 2–1 to eventual champions Chang Thailand Slammers. The 2010–10 season also saw local star Hong Wei Jian retiring from professional basketball after tearing his anterior cruciate ligament and fracturing his knee.

The formulative years of the ABL saw local players such as Wong Wei Long, Desmond Oh and Lim Shengyu rising to prominence. While fans saw numerous changes in the Slingers' foreign import roster, American centre Kyle Jeffers and Filipino point guard Al Vergara were regulars in the team, re-contracting with the Slingers on several occasions.

The Slingers became the first team to cross the 100-point mark in ABL history when they beat the Brunei Barracudas 102–61 on 9 January 2011. All players from the Slingers squad managed to get onto the scoreboard with Leo Avenido leading with 23 points and 4 assists. Tan Chin Hong was the player who scored the Slingers' 100th point.

=== 2014 season ===
The 2014 ABL pre-season saw the Slingers secure a big name in the form of ex-NBA player Hassan Adams, who turned out for the New Jersey Nets in the 2006–07 NBA Season and the Toronto Raptors in the 2008–09 NBA Season. Adams impressed the crowd with a game-high 21 points in the Slingers' season opening game against new entrant Laskar Dreya South Sumatra at the OCBC Arena but struggled with his fitness and health and played sparingly after that. After he sustained a hip injury in a road game loss to Hi-Tech Bangkok City in Bangkok, Adams sat out of the Slingers' next three games, watching from the sidelines as the Slingers went on to win all three against Saigon Heat, Laskar Dreya and Indonesia Warriors. Adams was then officially released on 11 August 2014 after it was confirmed by the team's medical staff that he would be sidelined for 4 to 8 weeks due to his injury.

The Slingers played their following game against the Westports Malaysia Dragons without a replacement for Adams in the foreign import slot and fell to a 59–85 defeat at the MABA Stadium in Kuala Lumpur. The following game saw the Slingers exacting revenge on the Dragons with a 77–68 scoreline in Singapore, a match which also saw Australian import Adam Becis turning out for the Slingers on a one match contract. Becis, who plays for the Singapore Supras in the Pro-Am Singapore Basketball League, turned out to be a shrewd signing as he scored 12 points during the game, including a three-pointer which overturned the score to 54–52 in the Slingers' favour at the end of the third period.

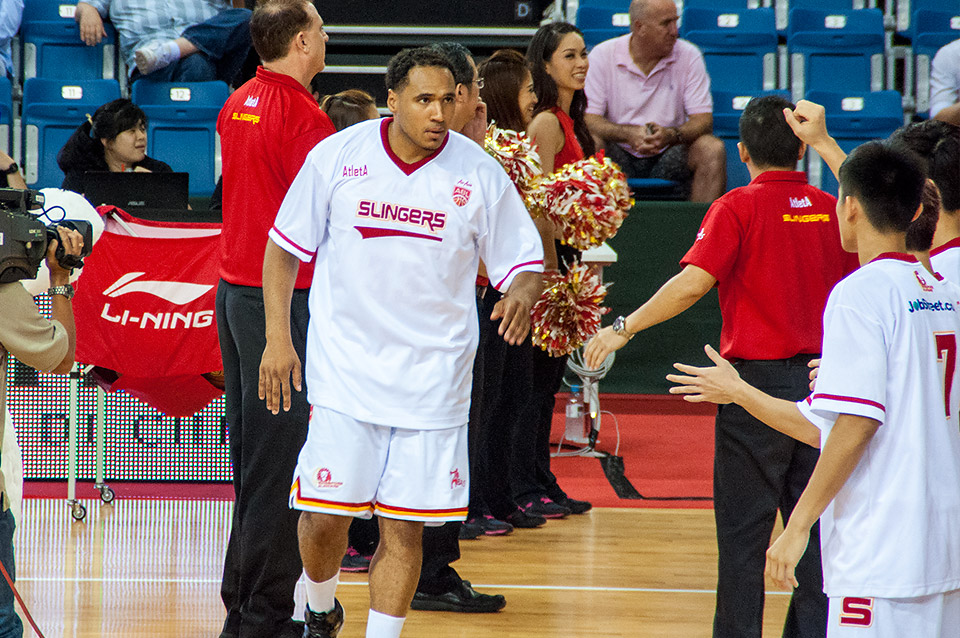
Dior Lowhorn making his first appearance in a Slingers shirt on 22 August 2014.

On 19 August 2014, the Slingers announced that they had signed former Saigon Heat and Barangay Ginebra San Miguel forward Dior Lowhorn to fill up the empty world import slot. Lowhorn led the Slingers with 18 points in his first game but failed to stop the team from falling 54–65 to the Indonesia Warriors at home in a game which also saw rookie Russell Low score 10 points for the Slingers. A key player for the Singapore Youth National Team during the inaugural Youth Olympic Games held in Singapore in 2010, as well as the Singapore Men's National Team which won the bronze medal at the 2013 Southeast Asian Games, Low was drafted into the team after completing his National Service.

The next game saw the Slingers bounce back from defeat with a 77–62 win against Laskar Dreya at the Hi-Test Arena in Batam on 25 August 2014. Lowhorn chalked up an impressive 28 points and 10 rebounds while Kyle Jeffers posted 19 points. Wong Wei Long added a further 14 points for the Slingers to top off a performance which improved the Slingers' record to 6-4 and allowing them to climb up to third position in the league standings.

On 31 August 2014, the Slingers ended Hi-Tech Bangkok City's undefeated run with a dramatic 78–75 victory in overtime. The game saw Dior Lowhorn score a season high 35 big points which included a three-pointer from the baseline in the dying seconds of the fourth quarter that sent the game into overtime. The game also saw Wong Wei Long finish with 16 points while Al Vergara added 11 points and 9 assists off the Slingers' bench. Team captain Kyle Jeffers was injured in the same match when he fell awkwardly while competing for a rebound in the third quarter and had to be stretchered off.

The Slingers subsequently announced on 9 September 2014 that Jeffers had been placed on the injured reserve list while former Saigon Heat centre Justin Howard had been brought in as a replacement. Prior to signing for the Slingers, Howard played two games in August 2014 for the Indonesia Warriors as a temporary replacement for the injured Chris Ellis.

A 79–65 victory over the Saigon Heat in Singapore on 1 October 2014 saw the Slingers inch closer to a playoff berth with Howard putting in a big performance, finishing with 24 points and 20 rebounds. Lowhorn added 20 points and 9 rebounds while Wong added 14 points. Desmond Oh, who started at point guard also contributed 7 points, 9 rebounds and 5 assists to help the Slingers improve to an 11–6 record. The game was also notable as the Slingers were dressed in a one-off, all pink ensemble for their 3rd annual Cancer Awareness Game. The pink jerseys were later auctioned off with 100% of the proceeds donated directly to the Singapore Cancer Society.

== Home arenas ==
The Slingers currently plays at the 3,000 seats OCBC Arena which opened in 2014 located at Kallang. In 2013, the Singapore Sports Hub and OCBC Bank announced that OCBC Group will become the largest sponsorship partner of the Singapore Sports Hub and will have naming rights to the OCBC Arena.

From 2006 to 2014, the Singapore Slingers played their home games at the 12,000 seats Singapore Indoor Stadium. During the 2006–08 NBL seasons, it was the highest capacity stadium among the other stadiums.

== Season by season ==
=== NBL season by season (2006–2008) ===
NBL champions	League champions	Runners-up	Finals berth

Season	Tier	League	Regular season					Post-season	Head coach	Captain	Club MVP
Season	Tier	League	Finish	Played	Wins	Losses	Win %	Post-season	Head coach	Captain	Club MVP
Singapore Slingers
2006–07	1	NBL	8th	33	13	20	.394	Lost elimination final (Townsville) 93–106	Gordon McLeod	Ben Knight	Mike Helms
2007–08	1	NBL	12th	30	6	24	.200	Did not qualify	Gordon McLeod	Ben Knight	Mike Helms
Regular season record				63	19	44	.302	0 regular season champions			
Finals record				1	0	1	.000	0 NBL championships			

As of the end of the 2007–08 season

=== ABL season by season (2009–2023) ===
ABL champions	Season champions	Runners-up	Finals berth

Season	League	Regular season					Postseason	Head coach	Captain	Club MVP
Season	League	Finish	Played	Wins	Losses	Win %	Postseason	Head coach	Captain	Club MVP
Singapore Slingers
2009–10	ABL	2nd	15	10	5	.667	Lost semifinals (Satria Muda) 1–2	Frank Arsego	Kyle Jeffers; Michael Wong	Michael LeBlanc
2010–11	ABL	4th	15	7	8	.467	Lost semifinals (Thailand) 1–2	Neo Beng Siang	Kyle Jeffers; Steven Khoo	Leo Avenido
2012	ABL	5th	21	9	12	.429	Did not qualify	Neo Beng Siang	Kyle Jeffers	Louis Graham
2013	ABL	5th	22	7	15	.318	Did not qualify	Neo Beng Siang	Kyle Jeffers	Rashad Jones-Jennings
2014	ABL	3rd	20	12	8	.600	Lost semifinals (Bangkok) 0–2	Neo Beng Siang	Kyle Jeffers	Dior Lowhorn
2015–16	ABL	2nd	20	16	4	.800	Won Semifinals (Bangkok) 2–1; Lost ABL Finals (Malaysia) 2–3	Neo Beng Siang	Desmond Oh	Justin Howard
2016–17	ABL	2nd	20	13	7	.650	Won Semifinals (Pilipinas) 2–0; Lost ABL Finals (Eastern) 1–3	Neo Beng Siang	Desmond Oh	Justin Howard
2017–18	ABL	5th	20	12	8	.600	Lost Elimination Finals (Mono) 0–2	Neo Beng Siang	Desmond Oh	Xavier Alexander
2018–19	ABL	3rd	26	16	10	.615	Won Quarterfinals (Macau) 2–1; Won Semifinals (Eastern) 2–0; Lost ABL Finals (Indonesia) 2–3	Neo Beng Siang	Desmond Oh	John Fields
2019–20	ABL	7th	17	7	10	.412	Season cancelled*	Neo Beng Siang	Jun Yuan Lim; Desmond Oh	Xavier Alexander
2023	ABL	4th	14	9	5	.391	Lost semifinals (Saigon) 1–2	Neo Beng Siang	Delvin Goh	Kentrell Barkley
Season record			210	118	92	.562	0 Season champions			
Finals record			37	16	21	.432	0 ABL Championships			

As of the end of the 2023 season

*Note: Season cancelled due to COVID-19 pandemic.

== Honour roll ==
NBL Championships:	None
NBL Grand Final appearances:	None
Finals Appearances	1 (2006/07)
NBL Most Valuable Players:	None
All-NBL First Team:	None
All-NBL Second Team:	None
All-NBL Third Team:	Mike Helms (2006/07)
NBL Coach of the Year:	None
NBL Rookie of the Year:	None
NBL Most Improved Player:	None
NBL Best Sixth Man:	None

== 2023 roster ==
Note: Flags indicate national team eligibility at FIBA-sanctioned events. Players may hold other non-FIBA nationalities not displayed.

Singapore Slingers roster
Players
Coaches

Pos.	No.	Nat.	Name	Ht.	Wt.
PG	0	(Singapore)	Muhammad Amirul	1.83 m (6 ft 0 in)	87 kg (192 lb)
PG	1	(Singapore)	Lim Jay Shay	1.73 m (5 ft 8 in)	75 kg (165 lb)
G	5	(Singapore)	Zachary Jian-Kai Helzer	1.86 m (6 ft 1 in)	81 kg (179 lb)
G/F	6	(Singapore)	Tay Ding Loon	1.83 m (6 ft 0 in)	83 kg (183 lb)
F	8	(Singapore)	Teo Yung Juen	1.91 m (6 ft 3 in)	82 kg (181 lb)
G	11	(Singapore)	Larry Liew	1.91 m (6 ft 3 in)	83 kg (183 lb)
G	12	(Singapore)	Justen Chiam Yue Jun	1.77 m (5 ft 10 in)	72 kg (159 lb)
G/F	15	(United States)	Xavier Alexander (WI)	1.96 m (6 ft 5 in)	95 kg (209 lb)
F	18	(Singapore)	Mah Jun Hao Jackson	1.91 m (6 ft 3 in)	88 kg (194 lb)
F	21	(Singapore)	Xu Duanyang	1.92 m (6 ft 4 in)	88 kg (194 lb)
F	22	(Singapore)	Kelvin Lim	1.91 m (6 ft 3 in)	84 kg (185 lb)
F	23	(Singapore)	Delvin Goh (C)	2.01 m (6 ft 7 in)	101 kg (223 lb)
G	24	(United States)	Kentrell Barkley (WI)	1.96 m (6 ft 5 in)	93 kg (205 lb)
C	25	(Singapore)	Lavin Raj	2.02 m (6 ft 8 in)	145 kg (320 lb)
C	34	(United States)	Chanceler Gettys (WI)	2.13 m (7 ft 0 in)	120 kg (265 lb)

Head coach

- (Singapore) Neo Beng Siang

Assistant coach(es)

- (Australia) Michael Johnson

Legend

- (C) Team captain
- (WI) World import
- Injured

- Roster
Updated: 2 January 2023

This is the lineup of the Slingers for the 2023 ABL season.

=== Depth chart ===
Pos.	Starting 5	Bench 1	Bench 2
C	(United States) Anthony McClain	(Singapore) V Lavin Raj
PF	(Singapore) Delvin Goh	(Singapore) Kelvin Lim	(Singapore) Tay Ding Loon
SF	(United States) Xavier Alexander	(Singapore) Desmond Oh	(Singapore) Ng Shi Yu
SG	(Singapore) Leon Kwek	(Singapore) Larry Liew	(Singapore) Ng Jing Lun, John
PG	(United States) Marcus Elliott	(Singapore) Lim Jun Yuan	(Singapore) Ng Kian Hao

== Notable imports ==
- (Australia) Brad Davidson
- (Australia) Larry Davidson
- (Australia) Blagoj Janev
- (Australia) Ben Knight
- (Australia) Shane McDonald
- (Australia) Ben Melmeth
- (Australia) Darren Ng
- (Australia) Luke Schenscher
- (Australia) Aaron Trahair
- (Australia) Pero Vasiljevic
- (India) Eban Hyams
- (South Korea) Lee Seung-jun
- (New Zealand) Jeremy Kench
- (Philippines) Leonidez Avenido
- (Philippines) Junjun Cabatu
- (Philippines) Jayson Castro
- (Philippines) Don Dulay
- (Philippines) Phillip Morrison
- (Philippines) Al Vergara
- (United States) Hassan Adams
- (United States) Christopher Vaughn Canta
- (United States) Marquin Chandler
- (United States) Chris Charles
- (United States) John Fields
- (United States) Louis Graham
- (United States) Rod Grizzard
- (United States) Mike Helms
- (United States) Justin Howard
- (United States) Kyle Jeffers
- (United States) Rashad Jones-Jennings
- (United States) Michael LeBlanc
- (United States) Donald Little
- (United States) Donald Rashaad Singleton
- (United States) Marcus Skinner
- (United States) Jerran Young
- (United States) Marcus Elliott

== Notable Singaporeans ==
- (Singapore) Koh Meng Koon
- (Singapore) Michael Wong
- (Singapore) Wai Sian Lim
- (Singapore) Prasad Sadasivan
- (Singapore) Marcus Ng
- (Singapore) Pathman Matialakan
- (Singapore) Hong Wei Jian
- (Singapore) Steven Khoo
- (Singapore) Mitchell Frederick Folkoff
- (Singapore) Damien Goh Teck Beng
- (Singapore) Shengyu Lim
- (Singapore) Wei Long Wong
- (Singapore) Desmond Oh
- (Singapore) Leon Kwek
- (Singapore) Teo Chun Hoe
- (Singapore) Ng Han Bin
- (Singapore) Delvin Goh
- (Singapore) Russel Low

== Coaches ==
- (Australia) Gordon McLeod (2006–08)
- (Australia) Frank Arsego (2009–10)
- (Singapore) Neo Beng Siang (2010–2023)
