= Hong Wei Jian =

Singaporean basketball player

Hong Wei Jian 洪伟健
Personal information
- Born: 20 August 1985 (age 41) Singapore
- Listed height: 5 ft 11 in (1.80 m)
- Listed weight: 145 lb (66 kg)

Career information
- Playing career: 2008–2011
- Position: Shooting guard

Career history
- 2009–2011: Singapore Slingers

Career highlights
- 2009–10 Singapore Slingers Most Improved Player

Hong Wei Jian (Chinese: 洪伟健; pinyin: Hóng Wěijiàn; born 20 August 1985), also known as "Flyboy", is a Singapore basketball player who played for the Singapore Slingers.

== Club career ==
In 2008, Hong played a few games with the Singapore Slingers while the team was competing in the 2008/09 Singapore Challenge Series.

In August 2009, Hong signed a one-year contract to play for the Singapore Slingers, along with Pathman Matialakan. Hong was named the Slingers' Most Improved Player for the 2009-2010 ABL season on the Slingers Awards Night on 17 February 2010.

Hong retired from professional basketball after tearing his anterior cruciate ligament and fracturing his knee during the 2010-11 ABL season.

== International career ==
Hong is also part of the Singapore men's national basketball team.

== ABL Statistics ==
Legend
GP	Games played	GS	Games started	MPG	Minutes per game
FG%	Field goal percentage	3P%	3-point field goal percentage	FT%	Free throw percentage
RPG	Rebounds per game	APG	Assists per game	SPG	Steals per game
BPG	Blocks per game	PPG	Points per game	**Bold**	Career high

=== Season ===
Year	Team	GP	GS	MPG	FG%	3P%	FT%	RPG	APG	SPG	BPG	PPG
2009-10	Slingers	18	12	17:55	.427	.371	.622	2.2	.8	1.08	.00	7.6
Career		18	12	17:55	.427	.371	.622	2.2	.8	1.08	.00	7.6

=== Playoffs ===
Year	Team	GP	GS	MPG	FG%	3P%	FT%	RPG	APG	SPG	BPG	PPG
2009-10	Slingers	3	3	23:10	.434	.285	.833	4.0	1.7	1.67	.00	10.6
Career		3	3	23.10	.434	.285	.833	4.0	1.7	1.67	.00	10.6
