= 2015 SEABA Championship squads =

This page features the teams that played at the 2015 SEABA Championship in Singapore. The list names the players for their respective participation in their National Basketball teams during the championship, including Philippines, Malaysia, Singapore, Indonesia, Laos and Brunei.

== Brunei ==
Brunei men's national basketball team - 2015 SEABA Championship roster
Players
Coaches

Pos.	No.	Name	Age – Date of birth	Height	Club	Ctr.
PF	4	Kian Leong Soon	24 – 22 April 1991	1.83 m (6 ft 0 in)	Beruang Blazers	(Brunei)
PG	5	Ching Poh Chong	32 – 20 November 1982	1.70 m (5 ft 7 in)		(Brunei)
SG	6	Liang Wei Lim	–	1.80 m (5 ft 11 in)	Mochi-Each A Cup	(Brunei)
PG	7	Wei Ming Ching	23 – 28 January 1992		Miri Kingsar	(Brunei)
PF	9	Cheng Haw Lim	–			(Brunei)
SG	10	Chin Kai Khoo	23 – 30 September 1991	1.73 m (5 ft 8 in)	Beruang Blazers	(Brunei)
PG	11	Chew Siong Gideon Fong	19 – 7 December 1995	1.78 m (5 ft 10 in)		(Brunei)
PG	12	Mohd Jamri Ramlee	–	1.77 m (5 ft 10 in)	Brunei Barracudas	(Brunei)
C	14	Md Zainul Ashyraf Hussin (C)	27 – 28 October 1987	1.96 m (6 ft 5 in)	Brunei Barracudas	(Brunei)
PF	15	Chee Jean Liew	–		Miri Kingsar	(Brunei)
PG	16	Jun Rhong Yang	–			(Brunei)

Head coach

- (Philippines) Nomar Angeles Isla

Legend

- (C) Team captain
- Club – describes last
  club before the tournament

== Indonesia ==
Indonesia men's national basketball team - 2015 SEABA Championship roster
Players
Coaches

Pos.	No.	Name	Age – Date of birth	Height	Club	Ctr.
C	4	Restu Dwi Purnomo	22 – 4 February 1993	1.92 m (6 ft 4 in)	Bima Perkasa Jogja	(Indonesia)
C	5	Respati Ragil Pamungkas	24 – 3 April 1991	1.80 m (5 ft 11 in)	Satya Wacana Metro LBC Bandung	(Indonesia)
PF	6	Luthfianes Gunawan	25 – 22 September 1989	1.94 m (6 ft 4 in)	Satya Wacana Metro LBC Bandung	(Indonesia)
SG	7	R. Azzaryan Pradithya	22 – 15 July 1992	1.81 m (5 ft 11 in)	NSH GMC Jakarta	(Indonesia)
SF	8	Muhamad Sandy Ibrahim Aziz	20 – 25 November 1994	1.88 m (6 ft 2 in)	Satria Muda Pertamina	(Indonesia)
PF	9	Laurentius Steven Oei	20 – 1 September 1994	1.95 m (6 ft 5 in)	Pelita Harapan University	(Indonesia)
PF	10	Juan Laurent	19 – 15 July 1995	1.94 m (6 ft 4 in)	Pelita Harapan University	(Indonesia)
PG	11	Yo Sua	23 – 23 November 1991	1.78 m (5 ft 10 in)	Satya Wacana Metro LBC Bandung	(Indonesia)
C	12	Firman Dwi Nugroho	24 – 16 October 1990	2.01 m (6 ft 7 in)	Satya Wacana Metro LBC Bandung	(Indonesia)
SG	13	Hans Abraham	20 – 24 February 1995	1.79 m (5 ft 10 in)	Pelita Harapan University	(Indonesia)
C	14	Muhammad Nur Aziz Wardana	20 – 25 September 1994	1.95 m (6 ft 5 in)	Pacific Caesar Surabaya	(Indonesia)
PF	15	Yanuar Dwi Priasmoro (C)	26 – 10 January 1989	1.90 m (6 ft 3 in)	Bima Perkasa Jogja	(Indonesia)

Head coach

- (Indonesia) Rastafari Horongbala

Assistant coach(es)

- (Indonesia) Fictor Gideon Roring

Legend

- (C) Team captain
- Club – describes last
  club before the tournament

== Laos ==
Laos men's national basketball team - 2015 SEABA Championship roster
Players
Coaches

Pos.	No.	Name	Age – Date of birth	Height	Club	Ctr.
PF	4	Siphandone Lothalath (C)	21 – 19 November 1993	1.84 m (6 ft 0 in)	Dunkin' Raptors	(Thailand)
C	5	Thavatsay Phongphoumy	16 – 30 October 1998	1.89 m (6 ft 2 in)
SG	6	Anouphab Sonenalad	20 – 27 February 1995	1.78 m (5 ft 10 in)
SF	7	Phimmasone Phannolath	21 – 13 August 1993	1.78 m (5 ft 10 in)
SG	8	Kimvanh Deebounhueang	20 – 14 November 1994	1.72 m (5 ft 8 in)
PG	9	Khonesavanh Lattana	–
SG	10	PhaAkone Phommasone	18 – 21 December 1996	1.75 m (5 ft 9 in)	U16 National Team	(Laos)
SG	11	Sengsavanh Phengyalath	20 – 26 February 1995	1.79 m (5 ft 10 in)	U18 National Team	(Laos)
SF	12	Phouthong Labouaphieng	19 – 15 February 1996	1.80 m (5 ft 11 in)	U16 National Team	(Laos)
C	13	Johnly Phanthady	31 – 28 October 1983	1.88 m (6 ft 2 in)
PG	14	Vilasack Senekeo	–		Luang Prabang	(Thailand)
PG	15	Chaleunphon Sounthala	19 – 10 October 1995	185 m (606 ft 11 in)

Head coach

- S. Wei

Assistant coaches

Legend

- Club – describes last
  club before the tournament
- Age – describes age
  on 27 April 2015

== Malaysia ==
Malaysia men's national basketball team – 2015 SEABA Championship roster
Players
Coaches

Pos.	No.	Name	Age – Date of birth	Height	Club	Ctr.
PG	0	Wei Keong Tong	22 – September 10, 1992	1.80 m (5 ft 11 in)	Perak Farmcochem B.C.	(Malaysia)
SG	1	Chee Huei Liaw	23 – March 7, 1992	1.87 m (6 ft 2 in)	Sarawak Fire Horse B.C.	(Malaysia)
PF	8	Wei Hong Choo	22 – June 20, 1992	1.98 m (6 ft 6 in)	Bintulu Eagles	(Malaysia)
SG	11	Yuen Yew Vincent Choong	24 – March 10, 1991	1.80 m (5 ft 11 in)	[[Unsigned]]	(Malaysia)
C	13	Yoong Jing Kwaan	24 – July 13, 1990	2.01 m (6 ft 7 in)	Malacca Chinwoo B.C.	(Malaysia)
PF	14	Way Tek Koh	32 – January 6, 1983	1.94 m (6 ft 4 in)	Perak Farmcochem B.C.	(Malaysia)
PG	17	Kok Hou Teo	20 – October 29, 1994	1.75 m (5 ft 9 in)	Perak Farmcochem B.C.	(Malaysia)
SG	20	Chee Kheun Ma	25 – January 28, 1990	1.79 m (5 ft 10 in)	Sarawak Fire Horse B.C.	(Malaysia)
PG	23	Eng Heng Soo	31 – April 4, 1984	1.83 m (6 ft 0 in)	Bintulu Eagles	(Malaysia)
PF	41	Ivan Yeo	22 – March 2, 1993	1.96 m (6 ft 5 in)	Bintulu Eagles	(Malaysia)
C	55	Tian Yuan Kuek (C)	23 – August 3, 1991	2.01 m (6 ft 7 in)	Malacca Chinwoo B.C.	(Malaysia)
PG	88	Sing Tee Ng	25 – October 21, 1989	1.81 m (5 ft 11 in)	Bintulu Eagles	(Malaysia)

Head coach

- (Philippines) Paul Advincula

Assistant coach(es)

- (Malaysia) Teh Choon Yean

Legend

- Club – describes last
  club before the tournament
- Age – describes age
  on 27 April 2015

== Philippines ==
Philippines men's national basketball team - 2015 SEABA Championship roster
Players
Coaches

Pos.	No.	Name	Age – Date of birth	Height	Club	Ctr.
G	4	Kiefer Ravena (C)	21 – 27 October 1993	1.83 m (6 ft 0 in)	Ateneo Blue Eagles	(Philippines)
G	5	Almond Vosotros	25 – 26 January 1990	1.77 m (5 ft 10 in)	Cebuana Lhuillier Gems	(Philippines)
G	6	Jio Jalalon	22 – 2 August 1992	1.77 m (5 ft 10 in)	KeraMix Mixers	(Philippines)
F	8	Glenn Khobuntin	22 – 19 February 1993	1.93 m (6 ft 4 in)	Jumbo Plastic Linoleum Giants	(Philippines)
G	9	Scottie Thompson	21 – 12 July 1993	1.86 m (6 ft 1 in)	Hapee Fresh Fighters	(Philippines)
C	10	Norbert Torres	25 – 20 January 1990	1.98 m (6 ft 6 in)	Cebuana Lhuillier Gems	(Philippines)
C	11	Marcus Douthit	35 – 15 April 1980	2.10 m (6 ft 11 in)	Blackwater Elite	(Philippines)
F	12	Mac Belo	20 – 30 December 1994	1.91 m (6 ft 3 in)	Hapee Fresh Fighters	(Philippines)
F	14	Kevin Ferrer	22 – 26 March 1993	1.93 m (6 ft 4 in)	Cebuana Lhuillier Gems	(Philippines)
G/F	15	Russel Escoto	22 – 2 December 1992	1.98 m (6 ft 6 in)	Far Eastern University	(Philippines)
F/C	16	Troy Rosario	23 – 20 January 1992	2.01 m (6 ft 7 in)	Hapee Fresh Fighters	(Philippines)
G	17	Bobby Ray Parks Jr.	22 – 19 February 1993	1.93 m (6 ft 4 in)	Hapee Fresh Fighters	(Philippines)

Head coach

- (United States) Tab Baldwin

Assistant coach(es)

- (Philippines) Nash Racela
- (Philippines) Jimmy Alapag

Legend

- (C) Team captain
- Club – describes last
  club before the tournament

== Singapore ==
Singapore National Basketball Team roster
Players
Coaches

Pos.	No.	Name	Age – Date of birth	Height	Club	Ctr.
SG	2	Wei Jie Desmond Oh (C)	28 – 16 June 1986	1.78 m (5 ft 10 in)	Singapore Slingers	(Singapore)
PG	5	Wong Wei Long	26 – 18 August 1988	1.74 m (5 ft 9 in)	Singapore Slingers	(Singapore)
PF	7	Qing De Wu	22 – 24 June 1992	1.83 m (6 ft 0 in)	Singapore Slingers	(Singapore)
PG	8	Qing Huang Toh	20 – 16 January 1995	1.83 m (6 ft 0 in)	Singapore Slingers	(Singapore)
F	10	Leon Kwek	18 – 19 August 1996	1.88 m (6 ft 2 in)	Singapore Slingers	(Singapore)
SG	11	Hua Sen Larry Liew	21 – 7 May 1993	1.90 m (6 ft 3 in)	Singapore Slingers	(Singapore)
C	13	Yeong Wooi Khaw	25 – 1 April 1990	2.00 m (6 ft 7 in)	Adroit - TRT Widodo	(Thailand)
C	15	Wen Qiang Russel Low	22 – 13 April 1993	1.97 m (6 ft 6 in)	Singapore Slingers	(Singapore)
SG	17	Ng Han Bin	26 – 12 January 1989	1.94 m (6 ft 4 in)	Singapore Slingers	(Singapore)
SF	22	Hong Da Kelvin Lim	18 – 20 September 1996	1.90 m (6 ft 3 in)	Singapore Slingers	(Singapore)
C	23	Delvin Goh	20 – 14 April 1995	1.99 m (6 ft 6 in)	Singapore Slingers	(Singapore)
SG	83	Chase Tan	25 – 1 April 1990	1.87 m (6 ft 2 in)	Singapore Slingers	(Singapore)

Head coach

- (Singapore) Neo Beng Siang

Legend

- (C) Team captain
- Club field describes current pro club
