= NCAA Season 86 basketball tournaments =

NCAA Season 86
- Youth Speaks @ 86!
- Host school: San Sebastian College - Recoletos
Men's Finals	G1	G2	Wins
San Beda Red Lions	93	85	2+1
San Sebastian Stags	73	70	0
- Duration: October 13–15, 2010
- Arena(s): Araneta Coliseum
- Finals MVP: Sudan Daniel
- Winning coach: Frankie Lim (3rd title)
- Semifinalists: JRU Heavy Bombers; Mapúa Cardinals
- TV network(s): Studio 23, The Filipino Channel, Balls HD
Juniors' Finals	G1	G2	Wins
San Beda Red Cubs	89	95	2
San Sebastian Staglets	64	84	0
- Duration: October 13–15, 2010
- Arena(s): Araneta Coliseum
- Finals MVP: Baser Amer
- Winning coach: Brit Reroma (1st title)
- Semifinalists: Perpetual Junior Altas; Letran Squires
- TV network(s): Studio 23, The Filipino Channel, Balls HD

The basketball tournaments of NCAA Season 86 refers to the basketball events of the Philippine National Collegiate Athletic Association (NCAA)'s 2010–11 season.

The San Beda Red Lions won all of their sixteen elimination round games to qualify for the finals outright needing to win twice against their opponent, which has to win thrice. The second-seed and defending champion San Sebastian Stags won the stepladder series against the JRU Heavy Bombers, which had earlier beaten the Mapua Cardinals. The Red Lions completed their 18–0 game sweep of the season when they won against the Stags in double digits to win in the second finals where the finalists were the champions of the two immediate seasons met since 2005. San Beda's American center Sudan Daniel won both season and finals Most Valuable Player (MVP) honors.

In the juniors' division, the San Beda Red Cubs lost only two games in the elimination round: one against the Letran Squires via technicality, and the other their last elimination round game against the San Sebastian Staglets which won via overtime. The Red Cubs and the Staglets defeated the Squires and the UPHSD Altalettes respectively in the semifinals to qualify for the finals. Like in the men's division, the Finals series was between two preceding champions; the Red Cubs also won double-digit games against the Staglets to successfully defend their championship. San Beda's Baser Amer won both season and finals MVP awards.

== Men's tournament ==
=== Teams ===
Team	College	Coach
Arellano Chiefs	Arellano University (AU)	(Philippines) Leo Isaac
Letran Knights	Colegio de San Juan de Letran (CSJL)	(Philippines) Louie Alas
Benilde Blazers	De La Salle–College of Saint Benilde (CSB)	(Philippines) Richard del Rosario
EAC Generals	Emilio Aguinaldo College (EAC)	(Philippines) Nomar Isla
JRU Heavy Bombers	José Rizal University (JRU)	(Philippines) Vergel Meneses
Mapúa Cardinals	Mapúa Institute of Technology (MIT)	(Philippines) Chito Victolero
San Beda Red Lions	San Beda College (SBC)	(Philippines) Frankie Lim
San Sebastian Stags	San Sebastian College – Recoletos (SSC-R)	(Philippines) Ato Agustin
Perpetual Altas	University of Perpetual Help System DALTA (UPHSD)	(Philippines) Boris Aldeguer

==== Changes from last season ====
Probationary members (from guest teams):

- Arellano Chiefs
- EAC Generals

Departed teams:

- AUF Great Danes

=== Preseason ===
JRU Heavy Bomber head coach Ariel Vanguardia was let go by the school after their semifinals loss against the San Sebastian Stags; former Heavy Bomber Vergel Meneses was hired to replace him. Arellano Chiefs' former head coach Leo Isaac takes over from Junjie Ablan. Isaac previously coached the Mapúa Cardinals from 2007–09; however he held the position while still Arellano head coach, at the time playing for the NCRAA. Meanwhile, Aric del Rosario is retained as the basketball commissioner.

The San Sebastian Stags emerged as the team to beat prior the season, finishing fourth at the 2009 Philippine Collegiate Championship, and winning the CHED Games, the Philippine Basketball League and more recently, the Fil-Oil/Flying V Championship.

=== Elimination round ===
==== Team standings ====
Pos	Team	W	L	PCT	GB	Qualification
1	San Beda Red Lions	16	0	1.000	—	Thrice-to-beat in the Finals (Note: As San Beda won all of their elimination round games, the stepladder format will be used instead of the regular Final Four format.)
2	San Sebastian Stags (H)	13	3	.813	3	Proceed to stepladder round 2
3	JRU Heavy Bombers	12	4	.750	4	Proceed to stepladder round 1
4	Mapúa Cardinals	9	7	.563	7	Proceed to stepladder round 1
5	Letran Knights	7	9	.438	9	
6	Arellano Chiefs (X)	6	10	.375	10	
7	Benilde Blazers	5	11	.313	11	
8	Perpetual Altas	2	14	.125 (Note: Head-to-head record: Perpetual 1–1 EAC (Perpetual +5))	14	
9	EAC Generals (X)	2	14	.125	14	

Source: ABS-CBN Sports
Rules for classification: 1) winning percentage; 2) if tied for top 4, one-game playoff; 3) head-to-head record; 4) overall point differential
(H) Hosts; (X) Under probation

==== Match-up results ====
	Round 1								Round 2							
Team ╲ Game	1	2	3	4	5	6	7	8	9	10	11	12	13	14	15	16
Arellano	EAC school colors	CSB school colors	JRU school colors	Mapua school colors	UPHD school colors	San Beda school colors	SSC-R school colors	Letran school colors	Mapua school colors	Letran school colors	CSB school colors	JRU school colors	EAC school colors	San Beda school colors	SSC-R school colors	UPHD school colors
Letran	SSC-R school colors	JRU school colors	UPHD school colors	San Beda school colors	Mapua school colors	CSB school colors	Arellano school colors	EAC school colors	JRU school colors	Mapua school colors	Arellano school colors	UPHD school colors	SSC-R school colors	CSB school colors	San Beda school colors	EAC school colors
Benilde	Arellano school colors	JRU school colors	EAC school colors	SSC-R school colors	Letran school colors	Mapua school colors	San Beda school colors	UPHD school colors	San Beda school colors	SSC-R school colors	EAC school colors	Arellano school colors	JRU school colors	Letran school colors	UPHD school colors	Mapua school colors
EAC	Arellano school colors	San Beda school colors	SSC-R school colors	CSB school colors	Mapua school colors	UPHD school colors	JRU school colors	Letran school colors	SSC-R school colors	San Beda school colors	CSB school colors	Mapua school colors	Arellano school colors	JRU school colors	UPHD school colors	Letran school colors
JRU	San Beda school colors	Letran school colors	Arellano school colors	UPHD school colors	CSB school colors	SSC-R school colors	EAC school colors	Mapua school colors	Letran school colors	UPHD school colors	SSC-R school colors	Arellano school colors	CSB school colors	EAC school colors	San Beda school colors	Mapua school colors
Mapúa	UPHD school colors	San Beda school colors	Arellano school colors	SSC-R school colors	Letran school colors	EAC school colors	CSB school colors	JRU school colors	Arellano school colors	Letran school colors	EAC school colors	San Beda school colors	UPHD school colors	SSC-R school colors	CSB school colors	JRU school colors
San Beda	JRU school colors	EAC school colors	Mapua school colors	Letran school colors	UPHD school colors	Arellano school colors	CSB school colors	SSC-R school colors	CSB school colors	EAC school colors	UPHD school colors	Mapua school colors	Arellano school colors	JRU school colors	Letran school colors	SSC-R school colors
San Sebastian	Letran school colors	UPHD school colors	EAC school colors	Mapua school colors	JRU school colors	CSB school colors	Arellano school colors	San Beda school colors	EAC school colors	CSB school colors	JRU school colors	UPHD school colors	Letran school colors	Mapua school colors	Arellano school colors	San Beda school colors
Perpetual	Mapua school colors	SSC-R school colors	Letran school colors	JRU school colors	Arellano school colors	San Beda school colors	EAC school colors	CSB school colors	JRU school colors	San Beda school colors	Mapua school colors	Letran school colors	Mapua school colors	CSB school colors	EAC school colors	Arellano school colors

= Win; = OT win; = Loss; = OT loss

==== Scores ====
Team	AU	CSJL	CSB	EAC	JRU	MIT	SBC	SSC-R	UPHSD
Arellano Chiefs		78–76	64–70	82–72	62–66	51–73	57–92	58–69	86–67
Letran Knights	72–58		70–54	88–65	62–67*	51–66	60–77	53–59	87–69
Benilde Blazers	71–69	69–72		71–76	65–74	63–65*	61–87	74–75	79–70
EAC Generals	60–71	47–68	64–83		61–69*	68–82	55–97	66–106	78–66
JRU Heavy Bombers	67–64	76–60	73–55	76–50		61–54	52–68	49–68	79–65
Mapúa Cardinals	72–76	63–60	64–59	74–64	54–68		64–69	49–68	79–65
San Beda Red Lions	70–54	74–56	89–70	92–68	78–46	90–78		90–82	73–69
San Sebastian Stags	62–64	59–58	62–51	81–63	64–59	85–76	82–90		73–69
Perpetual Altas	66–61	61–90	64–70	69–52	55–66	72–79	61–92	63–72	

Legend: Blue = left column team win; Red = top row team win.
Matches with lighter background shading were decided after overtime.

=== Bracket ===
Stepladder round 1 (Single-elimination)
3	JRU	60
4	Mapúa	54

Stepladder round 2 (Single-elimination)
2	San Sebastian	61
3	JRU	52

Finals (No. 1 thrice-to-beat)
1	San Beda	93	85
2	San Sebastian	73	70

=== Stepladder semifinals ===
==== (3) JRU vs. (4) Mapua ====
Studio 23

October 6

JRU Heavy Bombers	60–54	Mapúa Cardinals
JRU advances to the stepladder semifinals round 2

Filoil Flying V Arena, San Juan

==== (2) San Sebastian vs. (3) JRU ====
Studio 23

October 8

San Sebastian Stags	61–52	JRU Heavy Bombers
San Sebastian advances to the Finals

Filoil Flying V Arena, San Juan

=== Finals ===
- San Beda has to win twice, while their opponent has to win thrice to win the championship.

Studio 23

October 13

San Beda Red Lions	93–73	San Sebastian Stags
Scoring by quarter: 26–23, 18–17, 28–20, 21–13
Pts: Borgie Hermida 18; Rebs: Borgie Hermida 13; Asts: Borgie Hermida 4		Pts: Calvin Abueva 22; Rebs: Calvin Abueva 12; Asts: Pamboy Raymundo 5

Araneta Coliseum, Quezon City
Attendance: 11,018

Studio 23

October 15

San Beda Red Lions	85–70	San Sebastian Stags
Scoring by quarter: 20-17, 23-10, 15-22, 27-21
Pts: Sudan Daniel 24; Rebs: Sudan Daniel 19; Asts: Borgie Hermida 4		Pts: Edward Semira 13; Rebs: Ronald Pascual 8 Asts: Gilbert Bulawan 4
San Beda wins series in two games

Araneta Coliseum, Quezon City
Attendance: 13,018

- Finals Most Valuable Player: Sudan Daniel (San Beda Red Lions)

=== Awards ===
NCAA Season 86 men's basketball champions
San Beda Red Lions
15th title

The awards were given prior to Game 2 of the Men's Finals at the Araneta Coliseum.

- Most Valuable Player: Sudan Daniel (San Beda Red Lions)
- Coach of the Year: Frankie Lim (San Beda Red Lions)
- Mythical Five:
  - Sudan Daniel (San Beda Red Lions)
  - Calvin Abueva (San Sebastian Stags)
  - Borgie Hermida (San Beda Red Lions)
  - Garvo Lanete (San Beda Red Lions)
  - Andrian Celada (Arellano Chiefs)
- Rookie of the Year: Carlo Lastimosa (Benilde Blazers)
- Most Improved Player: Joe Etame (JRU Heavy Bombers)
- Defensive Player of the Year: Sudan Daniel (San Beda Red Lions)

==== Players of the Week ====
Week	Name
Week 1	Calvin Abueva
Week 2	Joe Etame
Week 3	Nchotu Njei
Week 4	Garvo Lanete
Week 5	Sudan Daniel
Week 6	Allan Mangahas
Week 7	Sudan Daniel
Week 8	Borgie Hermida; Nate Matute
Week 9	Sudan Daniel
Week 10	Garvo Lanete
Week 11	Calvin Abueva
Week 12	Sudan Daniel
Week 13	Garvo Lanete

== Juniors' tournament ==
=== Elimination round ===
==== Team standings ====
Pos	Team	W	L	PCT	GB	Qualification
1	San Beda Red Cubs (Note: San Beda forfeited their win against Letran when one of their players wore the wrong uniform.)	14	2	.875	—	Twice-to-beat in the semifinals
2	San Sebastian Staglets (H)	12	4	.750	2	Twice-to-beat in the semifinals
3	Perpetual Junior Altas	10	6	.625	4	Twice-to-win in the semifinals
4	Letran Squires	9	7	.563 (Note: Head-to-head record: LSGH 2–2, Letran 2–2, JRU 2–2 (LSGH +8, Letran +7, JRU −15); fourth-seed playoffs: Letran 87–73 JRU, Letran 91–85 LSGH)	5	Twice-to-win in the semifinals
5	La Salle Green Hills Greenies	9	7	.563	5	
6	JRU Light Bombers	9	7	.563	5	
7	Mapúa Red Robins	6	10	.375	8	
8	EAC–ICA Brigadiers (X)	3	13	.188	11	
9	Arellano Braves (X)	0	16	.000	14	

Source: ABS-CBN Sports
Rules for classification: 1) winning percentage; 2) if tied for top 4, one-game playoff; 3) head-to-head record; 4) head-to-head point differential; 5) overall point differential
(H) Hosts; (X) Under probation

==== Match-up results ====
	Round 1								Round 2							
Team ╲ Game	1	2	3	4	5	6	7	8	9	10	11	12	13	14	15	16
Arellano	EAC school colors	CSB school colors	JRU school colors	Mapua school colors	UPHD school colors	San Beda school colors	SSC-R school colors	Letran school colors	Mapua school colors	Letran school colors	CSB school colors	JRU school colors	EAC school colors	San Beda school colors	SSC-R school colors	UPHD school colors
Letran	SSC-R school colors	JRU school colors	UPHD school colors	San Beda school colors	Mapua school colors	CSB school colors	Arellano school colors	EAC school colors	JRU school colors	Mapua school colors	Arellano school colors	UPHD school colors	SSC-R school colors	CSB school colors	San Beda school colors	EAC school colors
EAC	Arellano school colors	San Beda school colors	SSC-R school colors	CSB school colors	Mapua school colors	UPHD school colors	JRU school colors	Letran school colors	SSC-R school colors	San Beda school colors	CSB school colors	Mapua school colors	Arellano school colors	JRU school colors	UPHD school colors	Letran school colors
JRU	San Beda school colors	Letran school colors	Arellano school colors	UPHD school colors	CSB school colors	SSC-R school colors	EAC school colors	Mapua school colors	Letran school colors	UPHD school colors	SSC-R school colors	Arellano school colors	CSB school colors	EAC school colors	San Beda school colors	Mapua school colors
LSGH	Arellano school colors	JRU school colors	EAC school colors	SSC-R school colors	Letran school colors	Mapua school colors	San Beda school colors	UPHD school colors	San Beda school colors	SSC-R school colors	EAC school colors	Arellano school colors	JRU school colors	Letran school colors	UPHD school colors	Mapua school colors
MHSS	UPHD school colors	San Beda school colors	Arellano school colors	SSC-R school colors	Letran school colors	EAC school colors	CSB school colors	JRU school colors	Arellano school colors	Letran school colors	EAC school colors	San Beda school colors	UPHD school colors	SSC-R school colors	CSB school colors	JRU school colors
San Beda	JRU school colors	EAC school colors	Mapua school colors	Letran school colors	UPHD school colors	Arellano school colors	CSB school colors	SSC-R school colors	CSB school colors	EAC school colors	UPHD school colors	Mapua school colors	Arellano school colors	JRU school colors	Letran school colors	SSC-R school colors
San Sebastian	Letran school colors	UPHD school colors	EAC school colors	Mapua school colors	JRU school colors	CSB school colors	Arellano school colors	San Beda school colors	EAC school colors	CSB school colors	JRU school colors	UPHD school colors	Letran school colors	Mapua school colors	Arellano school colors	San Beda school colors
Perpetual	Mapua school colors	SSC-R school colors	Letran school colors	JRU school colors	Arellano school colors	San Beda school colors	EAC school colors	CSB school colors	JRU school colors	San Beda school colors	Mapua school colors	Letran school colors	Mapua school colors	CSB school colors	EAC school colors	Arellano school colors

= Win; = OT win; = Loss; = OT loss

==== Scores ====
Team	AU	CSJL	EAC	JRU	LSGH	MHSS	SBC	SSC-R	UPHSD
Arellano Braves		67–79	60–68	63–73	57–79	66–86	41–77	58–76	71–86
Letran Squires	64–39		72–59	64–75	78–64	89–83	20–0 (Note: San Beda originally won 86–71. Letran placed the game under protest as San Beda player Baser Amer wore a different uniform from the one approved by the NCAA. The NCAA Management Committee upheld Letran's protest and awarded them with a forfeit win.)	83–89	84–91
EAC–ICA Brigadiers	67–60	58–72		67–77	68–81	74–88	60–85	60–67	59–70
JRU Light Bombers	91–83	75–86	81–78		72–90	82–78	71–89	70–69	74–90
LSGH Greenies	69–54	70–63	97–44	89–92*		68–72	67–71	71–65	54–62
Malayan Red Robins	74–52	86–74	76–71	79–83	71–72		64–89	75–72	85–89
San Beda Red Cubs	89–53	86–71	70–56	99–75	82–69	93–83		84–80	91–77
San Sebastian Staglets	81–59	78–68	82–65	78–70	74–49	73–69	76–75*		74–69
Perpetual Junior Altas	69–54	72–69	71–82	76–69	72–75	88–76	66–84	55–60	

Legend: Blue = left column team win; Red = top row team win.
Matches with lighter background shading were decided after overtime.

=== Fourth seed playoffs ===
These are a series of one-game playoffs to determine the #4 seed. LSGH received a bye to the final round due to owning a superior tiebreaker.

First round		Second round
		LSGH	85
Letran	87	Letran	91
JRU	73

==== Letran vs. JRU ====
October 2

Letran Squires	87–73	JRU Light Bombers

Filoil Flying V Arena, San Juan

==== LSGH vs. Letran ====
October 4

La Salle Green Hills Greenies	85–91	Letran Squires
Letran advances to the Final Four

Filoil Flying V Arena, San Juan

=== Bracket ===
Semifinals (Top 2 twice-to-beat)
1	San Beda	92
4	Letran	80
2	San Sebastian	87
3	Perpetual	76

Finals (Best-of-three playoff)
1	San Beda	89	95
2	San Sebastian	64	84

=== Semifinals ===
==== (1) San Beda vs. (4) Letran ====
October 6

San Beda Red Cubs	92–80	Letran Squires
San Beda wins series in one game

Filoil Flying V Arena, San Juan

==== (2) San Sebastian vs. (3) Perpetual ====
October 6

San Sebastian Staglets	87–76	Perpetual Junior Altas
San Sebastian wins series in one game

Filoil Flying V Arena, San Juan

=== Finals ===
Studio 23

October 13

San Beda Red Cubs	89–64	San Sebastian Staglets
Scoring by quarter: 27-11, 24-21, 24-22, 14-10
Pts: Von Chavez 21; Rebs: Baser Amer 9 Asts: Baser Amer 18		Pts: Gino Jumao-as 31; Rebs: Mark Magno 9 Asts: Gino Jumao-as 4

Araneta Coliseum, Quezon City

Studio 23

October 15

San Beda Red Cubs	95–84	San Sebastian Staglets
Scoring by quarter: 32-18, 21-29, 20-23, 22-14
Pts: Baser Amer 25; Rebs: Baser Amer 9 Asts: Baser Amer 8		Pts: Gino Jumao-as 38; Rebs: Gino Juamo-as 14; Asts: Gino Jumao-as 7
San Beda wins series 2–0

Araneta Coliseum, Quezon City

- Finals Most Valuable Player: Baser Amer (San Beda Red Cubs)

=== Awards ===
NCAA Season 86 juniors' basketball champions
San Beda Red Cubs
17th title, second consecutive title

- Most Valuable Player: Baser Amer (San Beda Red Cubs)
- Rookie of the Year: Rey Nambatac (Letran Squires)
- Mythical Five:
  - Baser Amer (San Beda Red Cubs)
  - Gino Jumao-as (San Sebastian Staglets)
  - Gelo Alolino (Perpetual Junior Altas)
  - Cris dela Paz (JRU Light Bombers)
  - Rey Nambatac (Letran Squires)
- Most Improved Player:Flash Sadiwa (Perpetual Junior Altas)
- Defensive Player of the Year:Vincent Menguito (EAC–ICA Brigadiers)

== Broadcast notes ==
Studio 23 carried all games live. SkyCable Channel 166 (Balls HD) aired the finals series on high definition live, with Balls SD airing the replays. The Filipino Channel broadcast the games outside the Philippines.

Game	Play-by-play	Analyst	Courtside reporter
First round			
Semifinal	Anton Roxas	Butch Maniego	Triska Echiverri and Mischi Mediana
Juniors' Finals game 1	Anton Roxas	Jude Roque	none
Men's Finals game 1	Bill Velasco	Butch Maniego	Ej Gamboa and Trishka Echiverri
Juniors' Finals game 2	Anton Roxas	Tonichi Ytturi	none
Men's Finals game 2	Bill Velasco	Allan Gregorio	Ej Gamboa and Trishka Echiverri

== See also ==
- UAAP Season 73 basketball tournaments

Preceded by Season 85 (2009)	NCAA basketball seasons Season 86 (2010)	Succeeded by Season 87 (2011)
