= EAC Generals basketball =

EAC Generals
2026 EAC Generals basketball team
- University: Emilio Aguinaldo College
- Head coach: Jerson Allen Cabiltes (4th season)
- Location: Ermita, Manila
- Nickname: Generals
- Colors: Red and White

UCAA Champion
- 2004, 2005, 2006

NCRAA Champion
- 2004

The EAC Generals basketball program represents Emilio Aguinaldo College (EAC) in men's basketball as a member of the National Collegiate Athletic Association (Philippines) (NCAA). The EAC Generals joined the NCAA in 2009, having been a fixture in the National Capital Region Athletic Association (NCRAA) and Universities and Colleges Athletic Association (UCAA).

== History ==
=== NCRAA and UCAA champions ===
The Generals have been champions in the NCRAA and UCAA due to the exploits of Ronjay Buenafe, seen to be as the best player in program history, having his #8 jersey retired by the team.

=== Entry to the NCAA ===
The Generals joined the NCAA in 2009 as one of the three guest teams. The Generals finished with a 6–12 record. Nomar Angeles Isla coached the Generals until 2010 when he went on to be their representative in the management committee. He was replaced by Gerry Esplana. They had their best showing in 2013 when they finished with a winning record at 10–8, but barely missed the Final Four. At the next season, the Generals finished outside the playoff places, and figured in a brawl against the Mapua Cardinals. This, coupled with internal issues with management, led to Esplana to resign.

Andy de Guzman coached the team in 2016 to a last-place finish. EAC-IAC Brigadiers (their juniors team) coach Ariel Sison then replaced de Guzman. In the 2017 season, the Generals, led by Sidney Onwubere, finished with a 7–11 record. After finishing with a 4–14 record in 2018, Sison was replaced by Oliver Bunyi. The Generals equaled their previous season record, but had notable wins against playoff teams Lyceum and San Sebastian. Bunyi bid farewell to the Generals after their 63-62 overtime triumph over Arellano University to close out their NCAA Season 98 Seniors Basketball campaign.

As of January 25, 2023, Jerson Allen Cabiltes has been tapped as the new head coach of the Generals. The Generals were eliminated from the playoffs in Cabiltes' first season in charge.

== Current roster ==
NCAA Season 102

EAC Generals roster
Players
Coaches

Pos.	No.	Nat.	Name	Height	Year	High School
G/F	81	(Philippines)	Bagay, Jude (C)	6'4" (1.93m)	–	Ford Academy of the Arts
F	16	(Philippines)	Baniqued, Jinryl	6'3" (1.91m)	–	Immaculate Conception Academy
PG	3	(Philippines)	Bonus, Clint	5'9" (1.75m)	1st	Immaculate Conception Academy
F	41	(Philippines)	Buen, Kyle	6'1" (1.85m)	–	Immaculate Conception Academy
G	1	(Philippines)	Campaña III, Rodonnel	6'0" (1.83m)	–	Immaculate Conception Academy
SG	24	(Philippines)	Castillo, Eien Janray	6'2" (1.88m)	–	Immaculate Conception Academy
F	18	(Philippines)	Coronel, Kelly	6'4" (1.93m)	–	Immaculate Conception Academy
G	13	(Philippines)	Lanceta, Noel	6'2" (1.88m)	–	Immaculate Conception Academy
C	14	(Philippines)	Luna, Gedric	6'2" (1.88m)	–	Immaculate Conception Academy
F	2	(Philippines)	Mundas, Edmund	6'3" (1.91m)	–	San Beda University
G	7	(Philippines)	Namoro, Jeffrey	6'1" (1.85m)	–	Immaculate Conception Academy
F	17	(Philippines)	Nunag, Joseph	6'5" (1.96m)	–	St. Augustine Academy Pampanga
PG	88	(Philippines)	Ochavo, Kyle	5'5" (1.65m)	4th	University of Southern Philippines Foundation
F	91	(Philippines)	Oftana, Wilmar	6'7" (2.01m)	–	San Beda University
PG	11	(Philippines)	Raymundo, Harvae	5'10" (1.78m)	2nd	Jose Rizal University
G	31	(Philippines)	Raymundo, Marvin James	6'0" (1.83m)	–	Jose Rizal University
F	8	(Philippines)	Sealy, Shannon	6'4" (1.93m)	–	–
F/C	12	(Philippines)	Shanoda, Jacob	6'3" (1.91m)	–	Ateneo de Davao University

Head coach

- (Philippines) Jerson Allen Cabiltes

Assistant coach(es)

- (Philippines) Noy Catalan
- (Philippines) Ariel Sison
- (Philippines) Jun Medina
- (Philippines) Bong Pineda
- (Philippines) Joseph Guion
- (Philippines) Dands Javier
- (Philippines) Harold Ng
- (Philippines) Randy Aldefolia

Strength & conditioning coach(es)

- (Philippines) Ric Sison

Team Staff

- (Philippines) Frederick Sarmiento

Legend

- (C) Team captain
- Injured

- Roster
Updated: September 3, 2024

== Head coaches ==
- 1998–2010: Nomar Angeles Isla
- 2011–2014: Gerry Esplana
- 2015: Andy de Guzman
- 2016–2018: Ariel Sison
- 2019–2022: Oliver Bunyi
- 2023–Present: Jerson Allen Cabiltes

== Notable players ==
- Ronjay Buenafe
- Nat Cosejo
- Laminou Hamadou
- Cedric Noube Happi
- JP Maguliano
- Sidney Onwubere (currently playing for the NLEX Road Warriors of the PBA.)
- Harvey Pagsanjan

== Retired numbers ==
- #8, Ronray Buenafe (2007)

== Season-by-season records ==
Season	League	Elimination round						Playoffs			
Season	League	Pos	GP	W	L	PCT	GB	GP	W	L	Results
2003											
2003–04	NCRAA										
2004	UCAA										Won Finals vs PSBA
2004–05	NCRAA										Won Finals vs CDSL
2005	UCAA										Won Finals vs DLSU-D
2005–06	NCRAA										
2006	UCAA										Won Finals vs St. Francis
2006–07	NCRAA										Lost Finals vs Arellano
2007	UCAA										
2007–08	NCRAA										
2008	UCAA	3rd									Lost Finals vs UCN
2009	NCAA	6th/10	18	6	12	.333	10	Did not qualify			
2010	NCAA	9th/9	16	2	14	.125	14	Did not qualify			
2011	NCAA	10th/10	18	4	14	.222	12	Did not qualify			
2012	NCAA	7th/10	18	8	10	.444	7	Did not qualify			
2013	NCAA	5th/10	18	10	8	.556	5	Did not qualify			
2014	NCAA	9th/10	18	4	14	.222	9	Did not qualify			
2015	NCAA	10th/10	18	2	16	.111	11	Did not qualify			
2016	NCAA	8th/10	18	6	12	.333	8	Did not qualify			
2017	NCAA	7th/10	18	7	11	.389	11	Did not qualify			
2018	NCAA	9th/10	18	4	14	.222	13	Did not qualify			
2019	NCAA	9th/10	18	4	14	.222	14	Did not qualify			
2020 (Note: Season cancelled due to the COVID-19 pandemic.)	NCAA	Season canceled									
2021 (Note: Season postponed to early 2022 due to the COVID-19 pandemic.)	NCAA	7th/10	9	3	6	.333	6	Did not qualify			
2022	NCAA	10th/10	18	3	15	.167	11	Did not qualify			
2023	NCAA	7th/10	18	9	9	.500	6	Did not qualify			
2024	NCAA	5th/10	18	9	9	.500	6	Did not qualify			
2025	NCAA	5th/5	13	4	9	.308	5	1	0	1	Lost play-in vs JRU
2026	NCAA	2nd/5	13	7	6	.538	2				
NCAA totals			285	92	193	.323	—	0	0	1	0 playoffs appearances

== Honors ==
=== Team honors ===
- National Capital Region Athletic Association (NCRAA)
  - Champions (1): 2004
- Universities and Colleges Athletic Association (UCAA)
  - Champions (3): 2004, 2005, 2006

=== Player honors ===
- NCAA Rookie of the Year
  - Cedric Noube Happi: 2012
