= Jon Kreft =

American basketball player

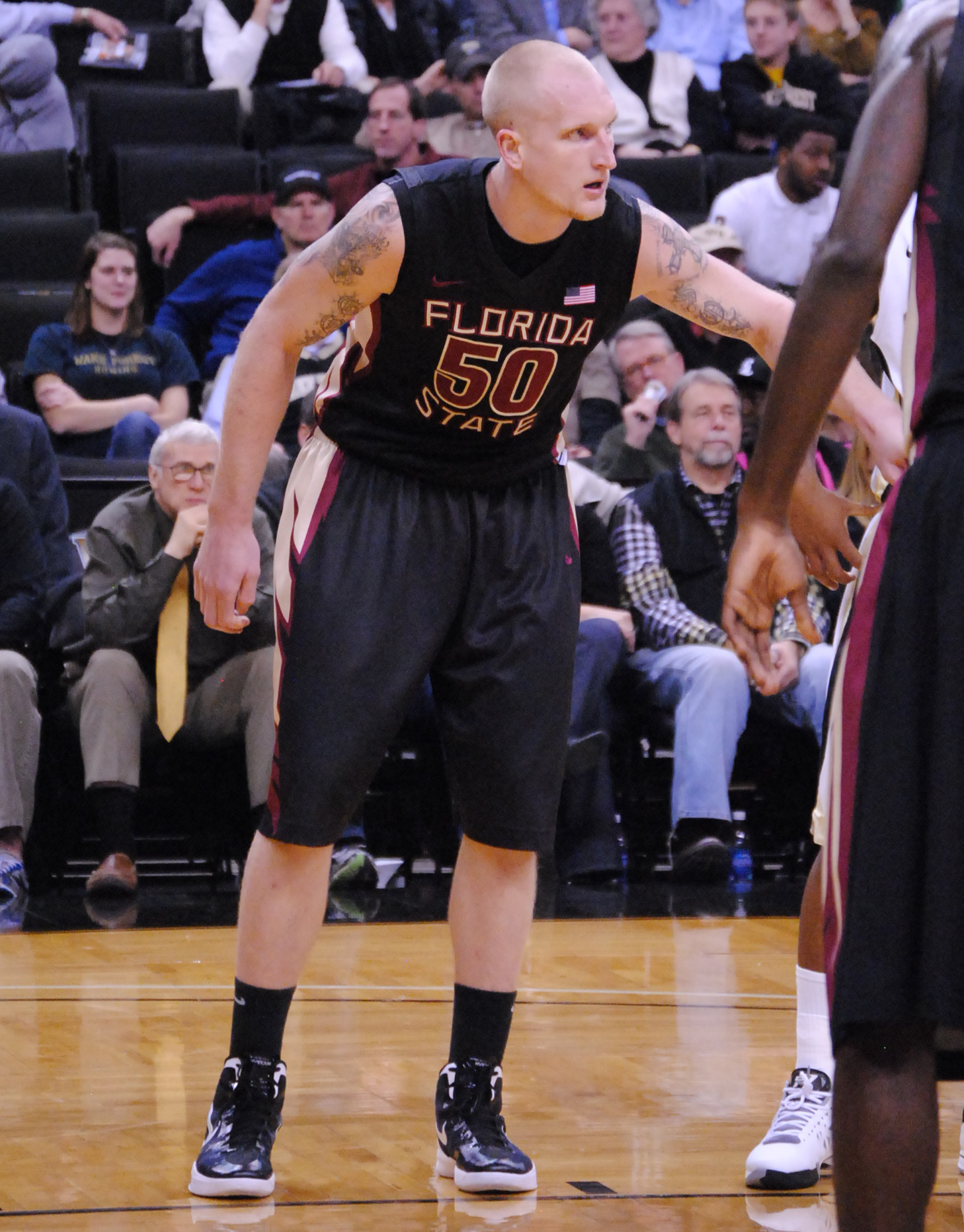
- Kreft playing for Florida State in 2012

Personal information
- Born: October 21, 1986 (age 40) Coral Springs, Florida, U.S.
- Listed height: 7 ft 0 in (2.13 m)
- Listed weight: 250 lb (113 kg)

Career information
- High school: Stoneman Douglas (Parkland, Florida)
- College: Chipola College (2007–2009); Florida State (2010–2012)
- NBA draft: 2012: undrafted
- Playing career: 2012–2017
- Position: Center

Career history
- 2012: Tsmoki-Minsk
- 2013: Kelantan Warriors
- 2013–2014: Tulsa 66ers
- 2014–2015: Osaka Evessa
- 2015–2016: Guaiqueríes de Margarita
- 2016: OSK R Airlines
- 2016–2017: Hi-Tech
- 2017: Lhasa Pure Land

Career highlights
- MNBL champion (2013)

Jonathan Bruce Kreft (born October 21, 1986) is an American professional basketball player. He played college basketball for Chipola College and Florida State University.

== College statistics ==
Year	Team	GP	GS	MPG	FG%	3P%	FT%	RPG	APG	SPG	BPG	PPG
2010–11	Florida State	25	0	9.8	.475	.000	.511	2.3	.3	.2	.4	3.2
2011–12	Florida State	35	0	10.3	.464	.000	.741	2.3	.2	.3	.6	2.8

== Professional career ==
After going undrafted in the 2012 NBA draft, Kreft joined the Memphis Grizzlies for the 2012 NBA Summer League. On September 12, 2012, he signed with Tsmoki-Minsk of Belarus for the 2012–13 season. In November 2012, he left after three games.

In August 2013, he signed with the Kelantan Warriors for the 2013 Malaysia National Basketball League season. On November 1, 2013, he was selected in the second round of the 2013 NBA D-League draft by the Santa Cruz Warriors. Three days later, he was traded to the Tulsa 66ers.

In June 2016, Kreft was signed by OSK R Airlines of the Thailand Basketball League.

== NBA D-League career statistics ==
Legend
GP	Games played	GS	Games started	MPG	Minutes per game
FG%	Field goal percentage	3P%	3-point field goal percentage	FT%	Free throw percentage
RPG	Rebounds per game	APG	Assists per game	SPG	Steals per game
BPG	Blocks per game	PPG	Points per game	**Bold**	Career high

=== Regular season ===
Year	Team	GP	GS	MPG	FG%	3P%	FT%	RPG	APG	SPG	BPG	PPG
2013–14	Tulsa 66ers	40	8	11.2	.485	.000	.841	2.8	.4	.3	.6	3.4
Career		40	8	11.2	.485	.000	.841	2.8	.4	.3	.6	3.4

== Personal ==
Kreft is the son of Paula and Bruce Kreft. His older brother, Dan, played college basketball at Northwestern from 1994 to 1996. He also has a younger brother, Mike, who served in the U.S. Army and played football at Valdosta State University from 2012 to 2013.
