= UCAA =

UCAA may refer to one of the following:

- Universities and Colleges Athletic Association: An athletic association of colleges and universities in the Philippines.
- Uganda Civil Aviation Authority: The government agency responsible for licensing, monitoring, and regulating civil aviation matters in Uganda.
