= NCR-UCL Athletic Association =

The NCR-UCL Athletic Association was a collegiate sports league based in the Philippines. The NCRUCLAA was a result of the merger between the two fledgling leagues, the National Capital Region Athletic Association and the Universities and Colleges of Luzon Athletic Association, in 2016. Lack of teams played in both leagues were the main reason of the merger.

In its first season, 16 teams competed in different sports disciplines, including centerpiece events Basketball and Volleyball. The league also considered adding 3-on-3 basketball in the line-up of events.

The first season of the NCRUCLAA was opened at the Cuneta Astrodome on January 17, 2017. The Asian Institute of Maritime Studies was the season's host.

Most of the basketball games will be covered by Solar Sports and Basketball TV.

At the conclusion of its maiden season, both the NCRAA and UCLAA will be operating as separate entities, making the merger last only for one season. For continuity purposes, the NCRAA considers the lone NCRUCLAA season as its 24th season.

== Teams ==
- Asian Institute of Maritime Studies** (Season 1 hosts)
- Colegio de San Lorenzo**
- De La Salle University - Dasmarinas*
- De Ocampo Memorial College**
- Don Bosco Technical College - Mandaluyong***
- Emilio Aguinaldo College - Cavite*
- National College of Business and Arts**
- Olivarez College*
- PATTS School of Aeronautics**
- Philippine Merchant Marine School*
- Philippine School of Business Administration - Quezon City*
- Philippine State College of Aeronautics**
- Rizal Technological University*
- Saint Francis of Assisi College System**
- Technological Institute of the Philippines**
- University of Makati***

* Formerly from NCRAA
** Formerly from UCLAA
*** new additions
