= Nomar =

Nomar is a masculine given name and a surname. Notable people with the name include:

- Nomar Garciaparra (born 1973), American baseball player and sports analyst
- Nomar Angeles Isla (born 1970), Filipino basketball coach
- Nomar Mazara (born 1995), Dominican baseball player
- Ramón Nomar (born 1974), Venezuelan-born Spanish pornographic actor

== See also ==
- Namor
