= Chris Kuete =

Cameroonian basketball player

No. 3 – Chang Thailand Slammers
- Position: Guard
- League: Asean Basketball League

Personal information
- Born: 10 June 1983 (age 41); Cameroon
- Listed height: 1.95 m (6 ft 5 in)
- Listed weight: 90 kg (198 lb)

Career history
- 2007–2008: Klang WCT Land BC
- 2008: HiTech Basketball Club
- 2008–2009: Bintulu Rainbow BC
- 2009–2010: Kuala Lumpur Dragons
- 2010–2012: Chang Thailand Slammers

Chris Daniel Kuete Lontchi (born 10 June 1983) is a Cameroonian professional basketball player in the Asean Basketball League currently playing as an import for the Chang Thailand Slammers. He previously played for numerous teams in the Malaysia National Basketball League, the most recent being Red Bull Barako. He was directly taken by Kuala Lumpur Dragons in 2009.

== Player Profile ==
Kuete is a guard who started his MNBL career with the Klang WCT Land BC. He was most notable for winning the 2007 Overall Champions and Most Valuable Players award with Klang WCT Land BC. He was traded to HiTech Basketball Club in Thailand.

He played for the Kuala Lumpur Dragons during the first season of the ASEAN Basketball League. For his second season, he was recruited by the Chang Thailand Slammers and won the playoffs defeating the Philippine Patriots in the finals. He is already committed to defend the title with the Slammers the next season.

== Awards ==
- Malaysia National Basketball League Most Valuable Players: 2007 (with Klang WCT Land BC)
  2009 (with Bintulu Rainbow BC)
- Thailand Open: 2008 (with HiTech Basketball Club)
