= Nomar Isla =

Filipino basketball coach

Nomar Angeles Isla
Personal information
- Born: May 1, 1970 (age 56)
- Position: Head coach

Career history

Coaching
- 1998–2010: EAC
- 2008–2011: Treston-Laguna
- 2011–2013: Sarawak Fire Horse
- 2011: Philippines (women under-16)
- 2014–: Brunei (men)
- 2014–: Brunei (women)

Nomar Angeles Isla is a Filipino basketball coach.

== Coaching career ==
Isla had a long stint as head coach of the collegiate team, Emilio Aguinaldo College Generals, guiding the team to win several championships at the National Capital Region Athletic Association (NCRAA), Universities and Colleges Athletic Association (UCAA) and University Games (UniGames). After coaching the Emilio Aguinaldo College team, he served as head coach of the Treston-Laguna Stallions of Liga Pilipinas regional basketball league from the league's inception in 2008 until 2011.

On 2011, the Sarawak Fire Horse hired Isla as their head coach. Isla stirred the Malaysian team to the championships at the 2011 edition of the Malaysian National Basketball League. Isla guided the Sarawak-based team until 2013 with Australian Adam James Steere taking over as new head coach of the team. He was later appointed head coach of the Philippine U-16 women's national team but had to resign citing personal reason before the team could participate at the FIBA-Asia tournament in China.

Isla also served as assistant coach for several teams. He was assistant coach of the Philippine U-20 men's team that won the Southeast Asian Basketball Association in 2000. The Negros Slashers of the Metropolitan Basketball Association (MBA), had Isla as their assistant coach. The MBA is defunct since 2002.

The University of the East had Isla as their assistant coach of their varsity team until early 2014. Isla was also team manager of the women's varsity. When Cebuana Lhuillier of the PBA D-League recruited the university's key players, Isla assumed role as the assistant manager of the team.

Isla was appointed as head coach of the Brunei men's national basketball team, a role which he formally assumed on 1 August 2014. Aside from coaching the men's national team, Isla also coaches the women's and veterans team of the sultanate. Isla's first test as the head coach of the men's team was the four team tournament, 2014 Borneo Cup. The national team finished last behind Miri, Labuan and eventual champions Kota Kinabalu, winning only a game against Miri.

== Coaching record ==
=== Collegiate record ===
Season	Team	Eliminations					Playoffs				
Season	Team	GP	W	L	PCT	Finish	PG	W	L	PCT	Results
2009	EAC	18	6	12	.333	7th	–	–	–	–	Eliminated
2010	EAC	16	2	14	.125	9th	–	–	–	–	Eliminated
Totals		34	8	26	.235		0	0	0	.000	0 championships

== Honours ==
Emilio Aguinaldo College Generals

- National Capital Region Athletic Association Champions: 2004-05
- Universities and Colleges Athletic Association Champions: 2004, 2005, 2006

Sarawak Firehorse

- National Basketball League Champions: 2011
