= 2013 Malaysia National Basketball League =

2013 MNBL Regular Season
- League: Malaysia National Basketball League
- Sport: Basketball
- Duration: 2013
- Number of teams: 5

Malaysia National Basketball League season

2013 MNBL Overall Champions Cup

MNBL seasons
- ← 2012 2014 →

The 2013 Malaysia National Basketball League Regular Season was the 33rd season of competition of the Malaysia National Basketball League (MNBL) since its establishment. A total of five teams competed in the league. The regular season began on 6 September 2013 with the 1st Series in Miri, Sarawak and ended on 29 September 2013 in Kuala Lumpur.

== Pre-season ==
A new format was announced for the regular season, where the teams will play in three Circuits. The playoff format was also changed: both the semifinals and the finals will be one-off series, instead of best-of-three series.

== Teams ==
| State | Club | Founded | City (Based) | Home Venue |
|---|---|---|---|---|
| (Perak) | Perak Farmcochem | 2003 | Ipoh, Perak | Indera Mulia Stadium |
| (Kuala Lumpur) | Kuala Lumpur Dragons | 2009 | Kuala Lumpur | MABA Stadium |
| (Sarawak) | Bintulu Eagles | 2013 | Bintulu, Sarawak | Bintulu Indoor Basketball Court |
| (Sarawak) | Sarawak Fire Horse | 2011 | Miri, Sarawak | Miri Indoor Stadium |
| (Kelantan) | Kelantan Warriors | 2013 | Kota Bharu, Kelantan | Chung Hwa Indoor Stadium, Kelantan |

== Standings & Results ==
=== Regular Seasons ===
==== 1st Circuits (Miri Indoor Stadium, Miri, Sarawak) ====
===== Standings =====
| Team | Games Played | Win | Lost | Points Scored | Points Conceded | Points Difference | Pts. |
|---|---|---|---|---|---|---|---|
| Kuala Lumpur Dragons | 3 | 3 | 0 | 218 | 177 | +41 | 6 |
| Kelantan Warriors | 3 | 2 | 1 | 227 | 222 | +5 | 4 |
| Perak Farmcochem | 3 | 2 | 1 | 228 | 225 | +3 | 4 |
| Sarawak Fire Horse | 4 | 1 | 3 | 286 | 300 | -14 | 2 |
| (Sarawak) Bintulu Eagles | 3 | 0 | 3 | 200 | 235 | -35 | 0 |

===== Fixtures and results =====
.

6 September 2013

Kuala Lumpur Dragons 78, Kelantan Warriors 61

Miri Indoor Stadium, Miri, Sarawak

.

6 September 2013

Sarawak Fire Horse 75, Bintulu Eagles 71

Miri Indoor Stadium, Miri, Sarawak

.

7 September 2013

Perak Farmcochem 62, Kuala Lumpur Dragons 83

Miri Indoor Stadium, Miri, Sarawak

.

7 September 2013

Kelantan Warriors 84, Sarawak Fire Horse 76

Miri Indoor Stadium, Miri, Sarawak

.

8 September 2013

Bintulu Eagles 61, Perak Farmcochem 78

Miri Indoor Stadium, Miri, Sarawak

.

8 September 2013

Sarawak Fire Horse 54, Kuala Lumpur Dragons 57

Miri Indoor Stadium, Miri, Sarawak

.

9 September 2013

Kelantan Warriors 82, Bintulu Eagles 68

Miri Indoor Stadium, Miri, Sarawak

.

9 September 2013

Perak Farmcochem 88, Sarawak Fire Horse 81

Miri Indoor Stadium, Miri, Sarawak

==== 2nd Circuits (Bintulu Indoor Basketball Court, Bintulu, Sarawak) ====
===== Standings =====
| Team | Games Played | Win | Lost | Points Scored | Points Conceded | Points Difference | Pts. |
|---|---|---|---|---|---|---|---|
| Perak Farmcochem | 2 | 2 | 0 | 181 | 121 | +60 | 4 |
| Kuala Lumpur Dragons | 3 | 2 | 1 | 223 | 203 | +20 | 4 |
| Sarawak Fire Horse | 2 | 1 | 1 | 133 | 134 | -1 | 2 |
| (Sarawak) Bintulu Eagles | 3 | 1 | 2 | 197 | 227 | -30 | 2 |
| Kelantan Warriors | 2 | 0 | 2 | 122 | 171 | -49 | 0 |

===== Fixtures and results =====
.

12 September 2013

Perak Farmcochem 92, Kelantan Warriors 49

Bintulu Indoor Basketball Court, Bintulu, Sarawak

.

12 September 2013

Bintulu Eagles 56, Kuala Lumpur Dragons 79

Bintulu Indoor Basketball Court, Bintulu, Sarawak

.

13 September 2013

Kuala Lumpur Dragons 72, Perak Farmcochem 89

Bintulu Indoor Basketball Court, Bintulu, Sarawak

.

13 September 2013

Sarawak Fire Horse 75, Bintulu Eagles 62

Bintulu Indoor Basketball Court, Bintulu, Sarawak

.

14 September 2013

Sarawak Fire Horse 58, Kuala Lumpur Dragons 72

Bintulu Indoor Basketball Court, Bintulu, Sarawak

.

14 September 2013

Bintulu Eagles 79, Kelantan Warriors 73

Bintulu Indoor Basketball Court, Bintulu, Sarawak

==== 3rd Circuits (Chung Hwa Indoor Stadium, Kota Bharu, Kelantan) ====
===== Standings =====
| Team | Games Played | Win | Lost | Points Scored | Points Conceded | Points Difference | Pts. |
|---|---|---|---|---|---|---|---|
| Kuala Lumpur Dragons | 2 | 2 | 0 | 150 | 133 | +17 | 4 |
| Perak Farmcochem | 3 | 2 | 1 | 216 | 179 | +37 | 4 |
| Sarawak Fire Horse | 2 | 1 | 1 | 151 | 148 | +3 | 2 |
| (Sarawak) Bintulu Eagles | 2 | 1 | 1 | 139 | 141 | -2 | 2 |
| Kelantan Warriors | 3 | 0 | 3 | 159 | 214 | -55 | 0 |

===== Fixtures and results =====
.

21 September 2013

Bintulu Eagles 75, Kuala Lumpur Dragons 82

Chung Hwa Indoor Stadium, Kota Bharu, Kelantan

.

21 September 2013

Kelantan Warriors 39, Perak Farmcochem 71

Chung Hwa Indoor Stadium, Kota Bharu, Kelantan

.

22 September 2013

Sarawak Fire Horse 76, Perak Farmcochem 86

Chung Hwa Indoor Stadium, Kota Bharu, Kelantan

.

22 September 2013

Kuala Lumpur Dragons 68, Kelantan Warriors 58

Chung Hwa Indoor Stadium, Kota Bharu, Kelantan

.

23 September 2013

Perak Farmcochem 59, Bintulu Eagles 64

Chung Hwa Indoor Stadium, Kota Bharu, Kelantan

.

23 September 2013

Kelantan Warriors 62, Sarawak Fire Horse 75

Chung Hwa Indoor Stadium, Kota Bharu, Kelantan

==== Final standings ====
| Team | Games Played | Win | Lost | Points Scored | Points Conceded | Points Difference | Pts. |
|---|---|---|---|---|---|---|---|
| Kuala Lumpur Dragons | 8 | 7 | 1 | 591 | 513 | +78 | 15 |
| Perak Farmcochem | 8 | 6 | 2 | 625 | 525 | +100 | 12 |
| Sarawak Fire Horse | 8 | 3 | 5 | 570 | 582 | -12 | 11 |
| (Sarawak) Bintulu Eagles | 8 | 2 | 6 | 536 | 603 | -67 | 10 |
| Kelantan Warriors | 8 | 2 | 6 | 508 | 607 | -99 | 10 |

== Playoffs for 2013 MNBL Overall Champions Cup ==
The 2013 MNBL Overall Champions Cup started on May 23, 2013 and concluded with Kelantan Warriors defeating Perak Farmcochem in the 2013 MNBL Overall Champions Cup Finals to claim the team's first ever MNBL title.

=== Semi-finals ===
.

27 September 2013

Kuala Lumpur Dragons 81, Kelantan Warriors 68

MABA Stadium, Kuala Lumpur

.

27 September 2013

Perak Farmcochem 77, Sarawak Fire Horse 60

MABA Stadium, Kuala Lumpur

.

28 September 2013

Kelantan Warriors 95, Kuala Lumpur Dragons 74

MABA Stadium, Kuala Lumpur

- Kelantan Warriors qualified 163-155 on points aggregates.

.

28 September 2013

Sarawak Fire Horse 83, Perak Farmcochem 81

MABA Stadium, Kuala Lumpur

- Perak Farmcochem qualified 158-143 on points aggregates.

=== Finals ===
.

29 September 2013

Kelantan Warriors 78, Perak Farmcochem 58

MABA Stadium, Kuala Lumpur
