= Paul Advincula =

Filipino basketball coach

Paul Daniel Advincula
Personal information
- Born: June 8, 1964 (age 62)
- Position: Head coach
- Coaching career: 2001–2017

Career history

Coaching
- 2011–2012: Perak Farmcochem
- 2013–2016: Malaysia

Paul Daniel Jorda Advincula is a Filipino basketball coach. He recently served as head coach of the Malaysia national basketball team from 2013 to 2016.

== Coaching career ==
Advincula was a former varsity player for the Divine Word University of Tacloban. His coaching career started when he invited coach Boysie Zamar to a clinic for 200 children in the year 2000. He was then invited by Zamar to be part of his coaching staff at the University of the East on the same year. Advincula would stay with the UE team until 2003 when he went to Malaysia to coach WCT Klang, a Selangor-based club. In 2005 he served as assistant coach of the Philippine national team. In 2008, he returned to the Philippines to Tagaytay where he coached in a basketball league organized by Tito Palma. Advincula was later hospitalized for two months and nearly died due to congested heart failure due to a virus.

In 2009, Advincula was invited to coach in Malaysia again and brought Odie Labarda as assistant due to him not having recovered fully from his condition the previous year. Advincula coached in Sarawak, then he served as assistant coach of the Kuala Lumpur Dragons of the ASEAN Basketball League, then led Perak Farmcochem.

Advincula was appointed as head coach of the Malaysian national team in 2013. Malaysian coach Goh Cheng Huat succeeded him in May 2016 and Advincula was reassigned as development coach.

== Personal life ==
Advincula currently resides in Kuala Lumpur. Lea, his second wife and four children lives in Tacloban. His first wife Gilene Sta. Maria whom he had his first three children died in 2014.
