= National Capital Region Athletic Association =

Student sports association in Metro Manila, Philippines

National Capital and Regional Athletic Association
- Founded: 1993
- First season: 1993
- President: Gerry Sergio (De La Salle University-Dasmarinas)
- No. of teams: 10
- Country: Philippines
- Broadcaster: PTV Sports Network

The National Capital and Regional Athletic Association (NCRAA) is an athletic association in Metro Manila (National Capital Region), Philippines established in 1993. It is primarily held during the second semester of a school around November until February.

Basketball and Volleyball are the centerpiece sports of the league but it also stage several events as well.

In 2016, the league merged with the Universities and Colleges of Luzon Athletic Association to become the NCR-UCL Athletic Association. However, the merger only lasted for one season and was dissolved at the end of its maiden season. NCRAA began operating again as a separate entity since November 2017. For continuity purposes, the NCRAA considers the lone NCRUCLAA season as its 24th season.

== Member schools ==
Institution	Nickname	Status	Founded	Color	Location
Asian Institute of Maritime Studies	AIMS Blue Sharks	Private	1993	Blue & Gold	Pasay
Bestlink College of the Philippines	BCP Kalasag	Private	2002	Sky Blue & Purple	Novaliches, Quezon City
De La Salle University – Dasmariñas	DLSU-D Patriots	Private (De La Salle Brothers)	1987	Green and White	Dasmariñas, Cavite
Emilio Aguinaldo College Cavite	EACC Vanguards	Private	1973	Red and White	Dasmariñas, Cavite
Immaculada Concepcion College	ICC Blue Hawks	Private	1984	Blue and White	Tala, Caloocan
Lyceum of the Philippines University-Laguna	LPU-L Pirates	Private	2000	Gray and International Red	Calamba, Laguna
Olivarez College	Olivarez Sea Lions	Private	1976	Gold, Red and Green	Dr. A. Santos Ave., Parañaque
PATTS College of Aeronautics	PATTS Seahorses	Private	1969	Blue, Yellow and White	San Isidro, Parañaque
Philippine Merchant Marine School	PMMS Mariners	Private	1950	Blue, White and Gray	San Antonio Rd., Las Piñas
University of Luzon	UL Golden Tigers	Private	1948	Maroon & Gold	Dagupan, Pangasinan

== Past member schools ==
- AMA University
- Arellano University (Prior to joining the NCAA)
- Asian College of Science and Technology
- Centro Escolar University
- Colegio de San Lorenzo
- De La Salle University (Team B)
- De La Salle-College of Saint Benilde (Prior to joining the NCAA)
- De Ocampo Memorial College
- Emilio Aguinaldo College (Prior to joining the NCAA)
- Lyceum of the Philippines University (Prior to joining the NCAA)
- National College of Business and Arts
- Pamantasan ng Lungsod ng Muntinlupa
- Pasig Catholic College
- Philippine School of Business Administration
- PMI Colleges (Philippine Maritime Institute)
- Polytechnic University of the Philippines
- Saint Francis of Assisi College
- Universidad de Manila
- Universal College (Paranaque)
- St. Clare College of Caloocan
- New Era University
- University of Makati
- Technological Institute of the Philippines
- Rizal Technological University
- St. Dominic College of Asia

== Men's basketball champions ==
- 1993: PSBA def. St. Francis
- 1994: St. Francis def. PSBA
- 1995: PSBA def. PUP
- 1996: St. Francis def. PSBA
- 1997: St. Francis def. PSBA
- 1998: DLSU def. St. Francis
- 1999: DLSU def. St. Francis
- 2000: St. Francis def. Lyceum
- 2001: St. Francis def. Lyceum
- 2002: St. Francis def. PSBA
- 2003-04: St. Francis def. PSBA
- 2004-05: EAC def. Colegio de San Lorenzo
- 2005-06: St. Francis def. Arellano
- 2006-07: Arellano def. EAC
- 2007-08: Arellano def. St Francis
- 2008-09: Universal College def. Arellano
- 2009-10: Olivarez College def. RTU
- 2010-11: Colegio de Santa Monica def. RTU
- 2011-12: PMMS def. OC
- 2012-13: Olivarez College
- 2013-14: Saint Clare College of Caloocan def. PMMS
- 2014-15: PMMS
- 2015-16: PMMS
- 2016-17: Colegio de San Lorenzo def. De Ocampo Memorial College
- 2017-18: Olivarez College
- 2018-19: Centro Escolar University def. PMMS
- 2023: Immaculada Concepcion College def. Olivarez College
- 2024: Immaculada Concepcion College def. DLSU-Dasmariñas

== Recent Juniors basketball champions ==
- 2005-06: Olivarez College def. Arellano University
- 2006-07: Arellano Def. EAC
- 2007-08: Olivarez College def. Arellano
- 2008-09: Arellano def. RTU
- 2009-10: RTU def. Olivarez College
- 2010-19: N/A
- 2023: Not Held
- 2024: Immaculada Concepcion College def. EAC-Cavite

== Recent Women's basketball champions ==
- 2006-07: DLSU-Dasmariñas def. PUP
- 2007-08: RTU def. EAC
- 2008-19: N/A
- 2023: CEU def. PUP
- 2024: DLSU-Dasmariñas def. CEU

== Recent Men's volleyball champions ==
- 2004-05: DLSU-Dasmariñas def. St Francis
- 2005-06: DLSU-Dasmariñas def. St Francis
- 2006-07: DLSU-Dasmariñas def. St Francis
- 2007-08: DLSU-Dasmariñas def. St Francis
- 2008-19: N/A
- 2023: PMMS def. PATTS
- 2024: TBD

== Recent Women's volleyball champions ==
- 2004-05: DLSU-Dasmariñas def. La Salle
- 2005-06: DLSU-Dasmariñas
- 2006-07: DLSU-Dasmariñas
- 2007-08: RTU def. St Francis
- 2008-19: N/A
- 2023: Immaculada Concepcion College def. DLSU-Dasmariñas
- 2024: TBD
