= Asian Institute of Maritime Studies =

Private merchant marine college in Pasay, Philippines

- Achievement, Integrity, Mastery, Service
- Motto: “We may not change the direction of the wind, but as one family, we can always adjust our sails to reach the port of our destination.” - Capt. Wilijado P. Abuid
- Type: Private, Maritime Higher Education Institution
- Established: February 22, 1993
- Founder: Capt. Wilijado P. Abuid
- Accreditation: Department of Tourism, Commission on Higher Education, ISO 9001:2015, Maritime Industry Authority, PACUCOA, PCNC, TESDA
- Affiliations: PAMI, Philippine Coast Guard, Philippine Coast Guard Auxiliary
- President: Dr. Arlene Abuid-Paderanga
- Vice-president: Dr. Felicito P. Dalaguete (Chief Executive Officer), Capt. Lino Paterno W. Paderanga (VP CPD), Ms. Janet A. Dandan (VP Student Services), Engr. Teodolfo N. Cada (VP Admin), Ms. Elisa A. Cayab (VP Finance)
- Students: Approx. 2500
- Location: Pasay, Manila, Philippines; 14°32′45″N 120°59′30″E
- Campus: Urban
- Demonym: AIMSian
- Colors: Newport Blue, Soft Silver, and Golden Yellow
- Nickname: AIMS Blue Sharks
- Sporting affiliations: National Capital Region Athletic Association (NCRAA)
- Website: www.aims.edu.ph
- Location in Metro Manila Location in Luzon Location in the Philippines

The Asian Institute of Maritime Studies (AIMS) is a Maritime Higher Education Institution (MHEI) in Pasay, Philippines that provides highly technical learning in maritime education. It is a specialized maritime learning and research institution and considered one of the top performing maritime schools in the Philippines consistently producing top-notchers in board examinations. It was founded in 1993 by Captain Wilijado P. Abuid along with other maritime leaders to provide world-class maritime education to the Filipino youth.

AIMS is a non-stock, non-profit educational institution comprising the School of Merchant Marine (SMM), School of Maritime Business (SMB), School of Engineering and Architecture (SEA), School of Heritage Education (SHE), and the School of Graduate Studies (SGS). The five schools have different field of study but as a whole it forms a coherent structure which supports the development of the Philippine maritime industry.

== History ==
The early 1990's witnessed the golden age of the Philippine maritime manpower industry. By then, the country had earned a reputation for being the primary source of seamen for the global shipping and transport market. The newly-established Commission on Higher Education (CHED), however, was concerned that there weren’t enough maritime Higher Education Institutions (HEIs) in the National Capital Region (NCR) that could help the country in meeting requirements to become the Manning Capital of the World. Then came the vision of a simple man with grand dreams – Captain Wilijado P. Abuid to provide world-class maritime education to the Filipino youth. It was February 22, 1993 when he embarked on a journey to build the Asian Institute of Maritime Studies (AIMS).

=== Birth pains and triumphs ===
AIMS opened its doors to aspiring seafarers on August 16, 1993, at a rented building along Pasay City Roxas Boulevard, a strategic bay front location. It didn’t take long until the school had more than 300 students, enough to fill up AIMS’ initial program offerings for the Basic Merchant Marine Course (BMMC), Bachelor of Science in Marine Transportation (BSMT), BS Marine Engineering (BSMarE), and BS Customs Administration (BSCA). The pioneering student body strove to excel, aided by the faculty and employees who were one of the school’s founders in providing quality education and a profession-driven culture. AIMS established a cadetship training program with the inclusion of the Naval Reserve Officers Training Corps (NROTC) program in its curriculum. The 257th NROTC Unit was used to hone the qualities of citizenship, character, and leadership in the school’s students, and consequently helped build AIMS’ reputation of instilling personal discipline in its cadets. The Unit consistently garnered awards, including first-place honors at the Annual General Tactical Inspection ceremonies from 1999 to 2004, and top citations at Summer Shipboard Training sessions for cluster schools with a Naval ROTC program. Just as AIMS was sailing steadily through the current of maritime education, another wave of challenges pounded its hulls. It had no ship to provide actual training facilities to its students, a sudden requirement implemented by CHED for maritime schools to be certified. In 1995, the school’s management made the bold move to purchase a training ship. M/V AIMS was launched that same year, a massive island of steel anchored on Manila Bay just within sight of the school. The costly purchase sparked the first wave of major investments made by AIMS and marked the beginning of the profession-driven culture in the institution.

=== Baptism of fire ===
AIMS sailed on steadily under its new president, Arlene. Enrollees for its maritime programs progressively increased and it slowly gained a reputation for being an excellent maritime institution in Manila. Then came the trials. AIMS’ two-year-old training ship was the first casualty. The school’s prized ship was docked in the bay waters near the school, looming and unmissable. M/V AIMS, a symbol of Capt. Abuid’s vision and hard work burnt down in September 1997. Ten months after the fire scorched their first major investment, a second tragedy struck - the AIMS Sea Tower caught fire. The flames engulfed the entire fourth floor of the Sea Tower and everything it contained, including the newly purchased Live Bridge Simulator. The management, embattled but not defeated, rallied together to keep the school going. Professors taught in movable, makeshift classrooms. They taught in the hallways. They taught in the rain, under leaking canvas roofs, clad in raincoats, and with umbrellas in hand. In between classes, the staff and teachers would have to empty and dry the areas where rainwater had collected in sections. The fires prompted the school administrators to stand firm and resolute in implementing safety standards in the school. How AIMS thrives in the face of challenges is a reflection of how its founder lived his life. The “AIMS Family” was born then, a team united by the firm resolve to go beyond expectation. What the school couldn’t provide in terms of facilities, they made up for by providing and pursuing academic excellence. The tragedies that hit the school were lessons served the hard way, a burning message to make a fortress out of the foundations that Capt. Abuid had built.

=== Full speed ahead towards success ===
As with all storms, clouds would eventually break to let the sun shine through. The series of fiery disasters in 1997 only made AIMS stronger. It rebuilt the Sea Tower, it also established its College of Business along Arnaiz Ave. and continuously expanded its campus along Roxas Boulevard. The AIMS campus along Roxas Boulevard looks out to a view of the sea. Its construction commenced at a time when the local maritime industry was experiencing a recession. Investments were then directed to the development of its educational and training programs. In 1998, AIMS became the first maritime school in the Philippines to implement a complete Quality Management System (QMS) in all its programs. To reinforce these standards, the school also revealed a new slogan: Achievement, Integrity, Mastery, and Service. The QMS was also an essential step in AIMS’ pursuit of national and global accreditation. CHED included the school in its “White List” soon after the school executed its new operational system, and a year later, the school gained an ISO 9002: 1994 accreditation from the American Bureau of Shipping. These accreditations were critical to the eventual expansion of the school’s programs over the next few years when it started offering business courses and master’s programs. The establishment of the College of Business ushered in Bachelor’s degrees in Business Administration and Computer Science in addition to the Customs Administration program that AIMS already offered. Seeking to provide the industry with well-rounded leaders and not just crew members, AIMS introduced the country’s first master’s program in Maritime Administration. Presently, only two other maritime schools in the Philippines offer a Master’s Degree in Maritime Administration.

=== Inspired by the light ===
By 2005, the Sea Tower had been completely rebuilt. It was now a six-story, lighthouse-style structure on the school’s main grounds. It was also during this period that AIMS proudly announced itself as the Home of Maritime Knowledge Exchange. A decade later, the 12-storey AIMS Tower was completed. In 2019 AIMS established its School of Heritage Education (SHE). The objective is to create a holistic, multiple-intelligence approach to learning and graduates that are attuned to their inner selves, happy, productive, and concerned citizens. This is part of the vision of AIMS to institutionalize heritage education and integrate it into campus life.

=== Riding the waves of time ===
In 2010, cognizant of the international trend in education, AIMS invested in a Learning Management System (LMS) that would allow students to pursue their studies online. These investments proved worthy amid the transition towards digital learning because of the pandemic. The implementation of these programs, as well as the improvement of the school’s infrastructure, the inclusion of arts and culture into the curriculum, the addition of foreigners into the student body, and the pursuance of online education, are all geared towards one goal: global distinction.

=== 30 years of wisdom towards a single vision ===
Last 2021, AIMS enhanced its vision to become “The Home of Maritime, Engineering, and Heritage Knowledge Exchange” not only in the Philippines but globally. When AIMS reached its 30th anniversary in February 2024, a recollection of its three-decade story occurred together with a stronger commitment to its widened vision. With the theme “Pearls of Wisdom,” the insights obtained over the past 30 years became a foundation to commit not only to student services but also to maritime nation-building with a global orientation.

== Campus ==
The maritime institution lies in the vicinity of Roxas Boulevard, A. Arnaiz Avenue (also known as Libertad Street), Roberts Street, and F.B. Harrison Street in Pasay. Its campus is composed of the AIMS Tower, Lighthouse Bldg., SEA Building (formerly CB Building), June Five Building, Annex and the M/V Buffalo Laboratory Building, Capt. Wilijado P. Abuid Foundation Building (WPA Foundation Building), and the AIMS Multi-purpose Court.

=== The AIMS Tower ===
The AIMS Tower is the main building of AIMS, and it is a 12-story structure that houses administrative offices, library services, data center, classroom facilities, and the San Vincente Ferrer chapel. It also features the JOA Auditorium, which can accommodate up to a thousand guests. Additionally, the building includes case rooms and various offices dedicated to student services. The highlight of this building is its views: sunset over Manila Bay at the front and the Makati skyline at the back.

=== Lighthouse Building ===
The Lighthouse Building is a six-story facility that serves as the primary laboratory and learning hub of AIMS. It features a training ship on Deck 1, state-of-the-art Bridge and Engine Simulators on Decks 2 and 3, drafting facilities and a hydraulic room for Naval Architecture programs on Deck 4, a maritime library on Deck 5, and the AIMS Museo Maritimo on Deck 6. A standout feature of the building is its lighthouse-inspired architecture, which has become a symbol of AIMS.

=== SEA Building ===
The School of Engineering and Architecture Building (formerly CB Building) is a four-story structure dedicated to AIMS' engineering and architecture programs. It also serves as a residence for cadets enrolled in the Merchant Marine Cadetship Program (MMCP). The ground floor of the building includes bank services.

=== June Five Building ===
The June Five Building is a five-story structure that serves as the home for the Hotel and Restaurant Management Function Room and other hospitality-related programs at AIMS. It also houses the school cafeteria and a bookstore offering school merchandise.

=== Annex and the M/V Buffalo Laboratory Building ===
The Annex is an extension complex of AIMS that includes the two-story M/V Buffalo Laboratory Building, the AIMS Cooperative and Barber Shop, admissions office, and parking facilities. It also houses the Integrated School of Science, the partner Senior High School of AIMS.

=== Captain Wilijado P. Abuid Foundation Building ===
The WPA Foundation Building is a two-story structure connected to the Annex. It serves as the dormitory for non-MMCP cadets. Additionally, the building houses the WPA Foundation offices, which support various programs and initiatives within the AIMS community.

=== AIMS Multi-purpose Court ===
The MPC is a complex that includes the school grounds, a basketball court designated for sports and recreational activities, and a two-story building. It serves as a venue for plays, demonstrations, and drills for both students and employees of AIMS. Additionally, the MPC houses the clinic and health services, the general education library, the regiment office, and the building and campus development services.

=== Facilities ===
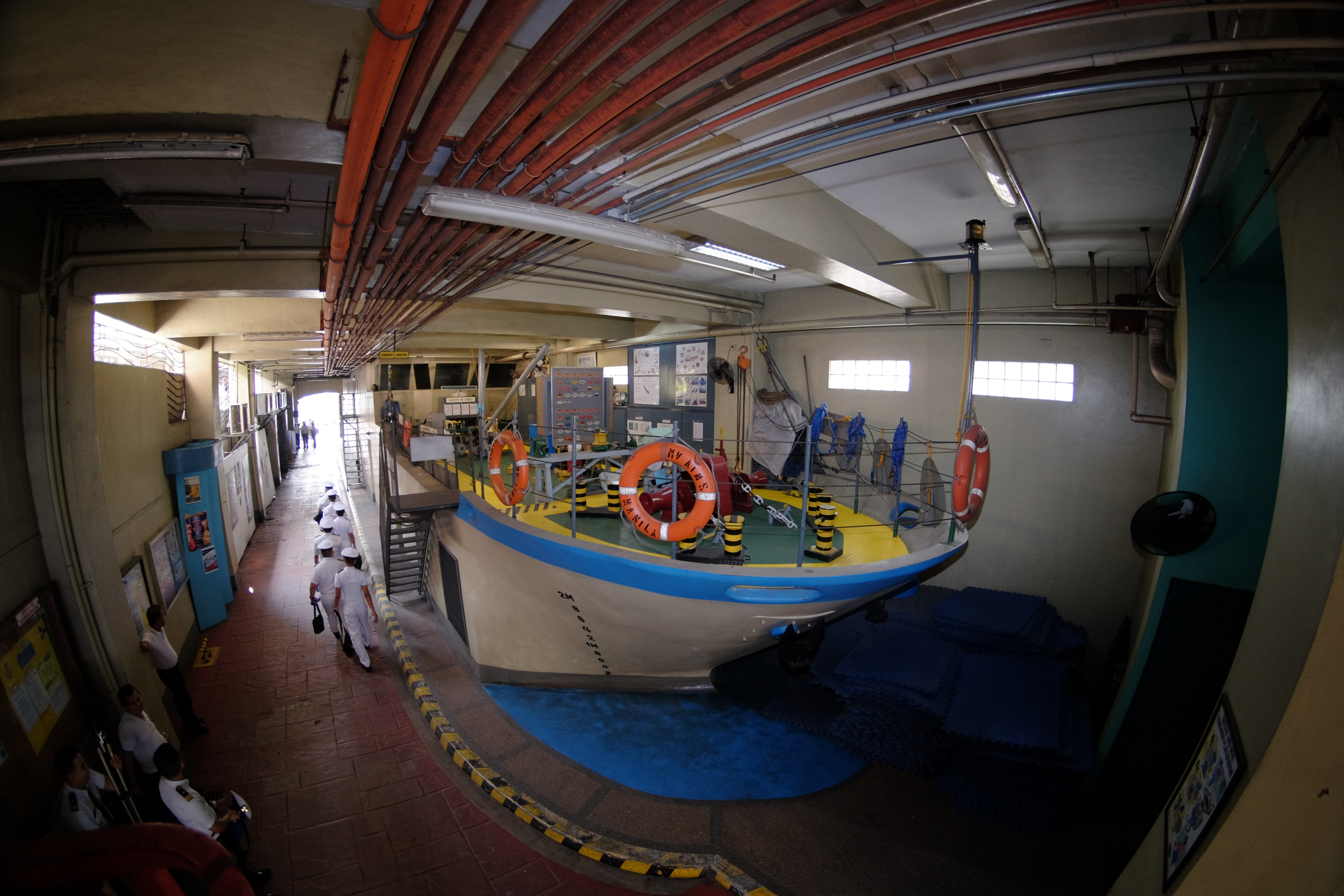
AIMS Seamanship Laboratory

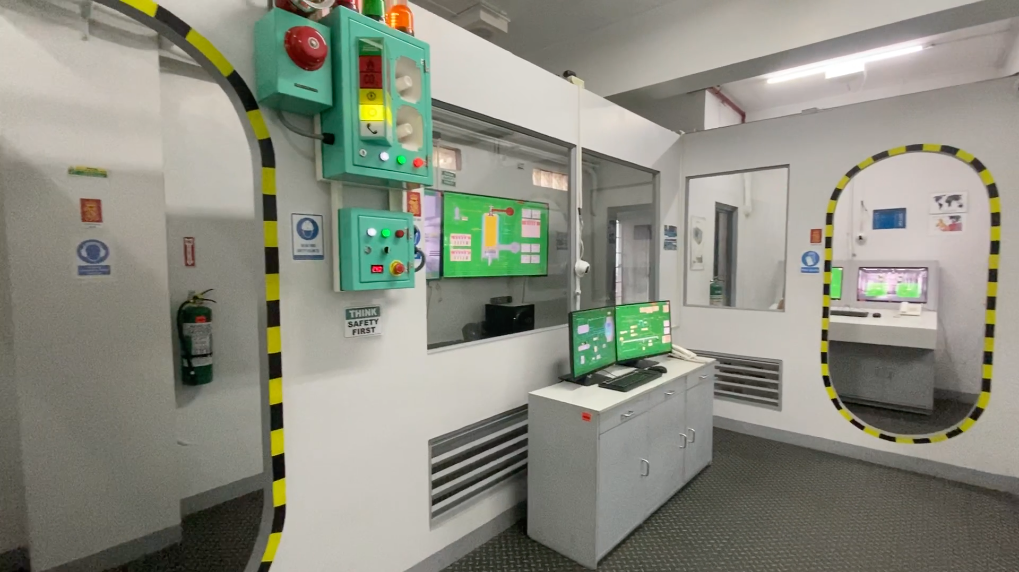
AIMS Engine Room Simulator

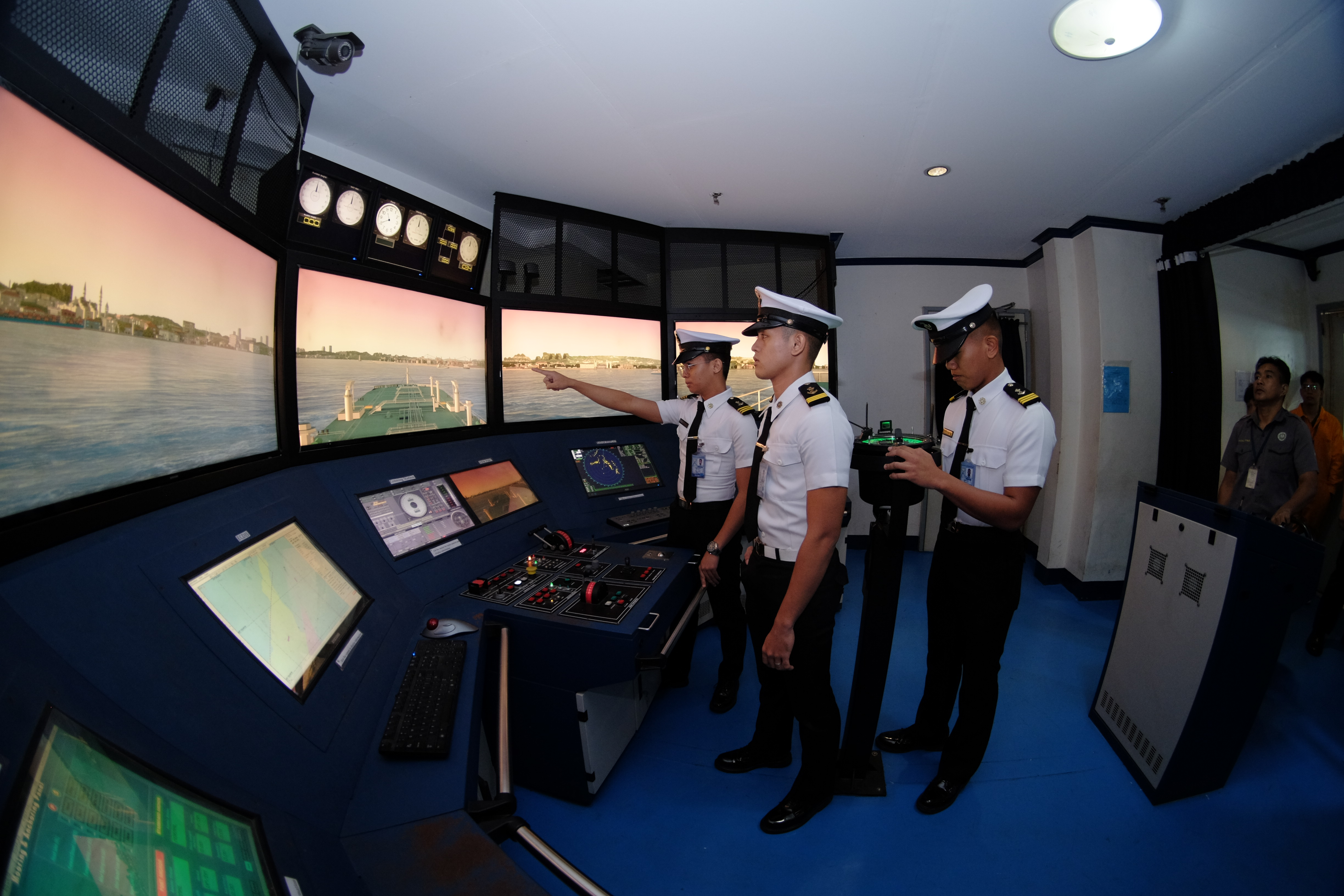
AIMS Bridge Simulator

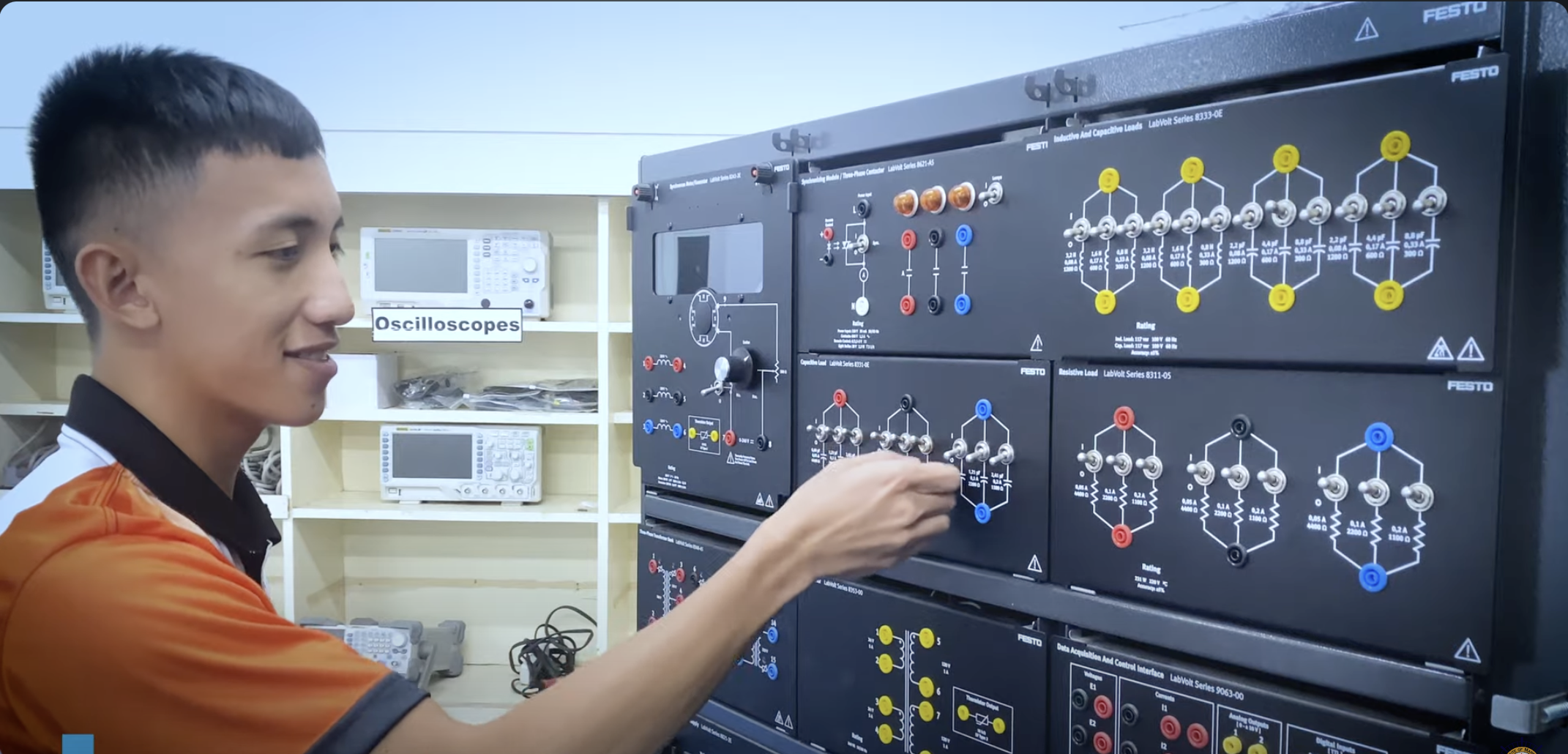
AIMS Engineering Laboratory

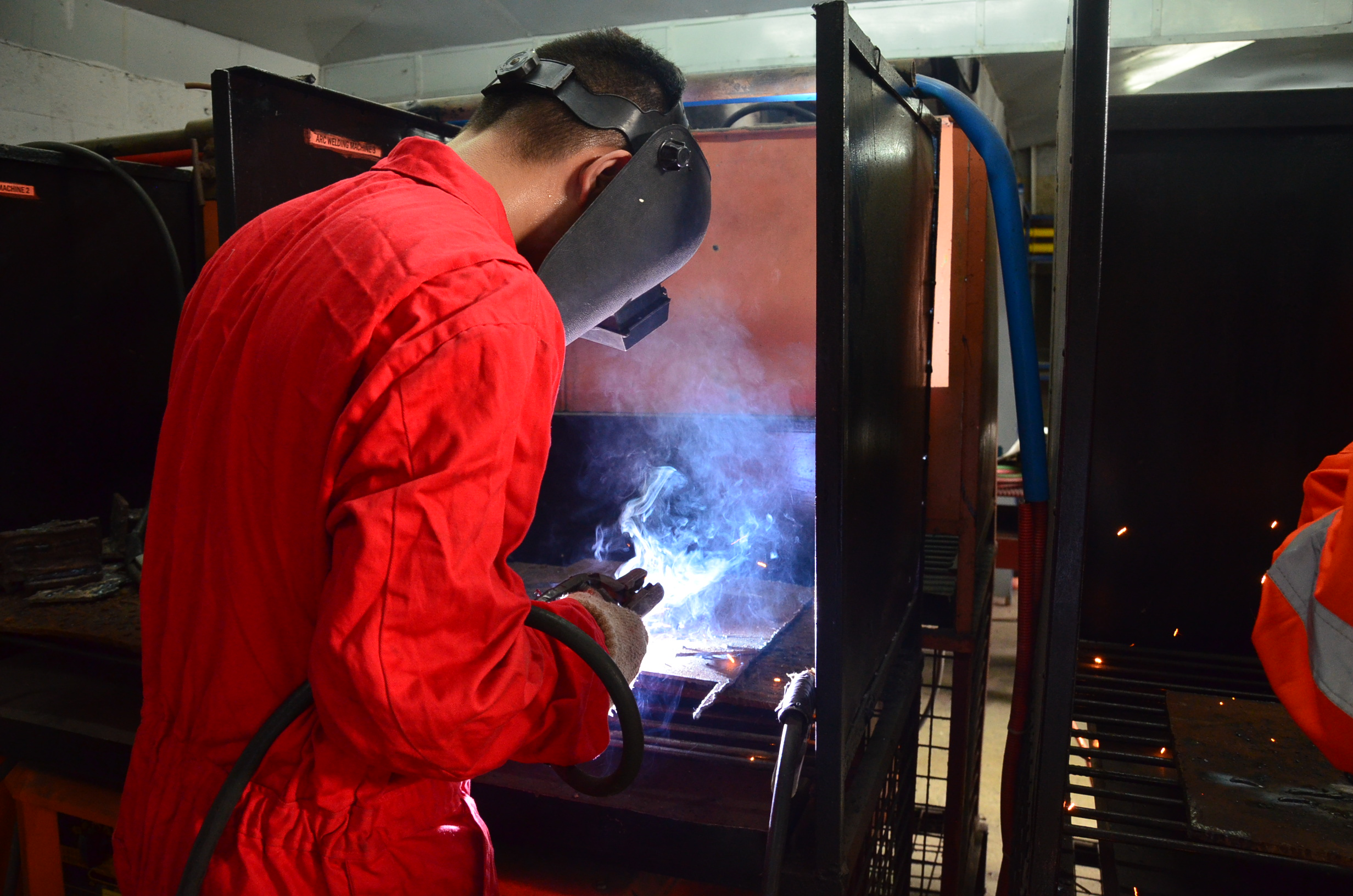
AIMS Machine Shop Laboratory

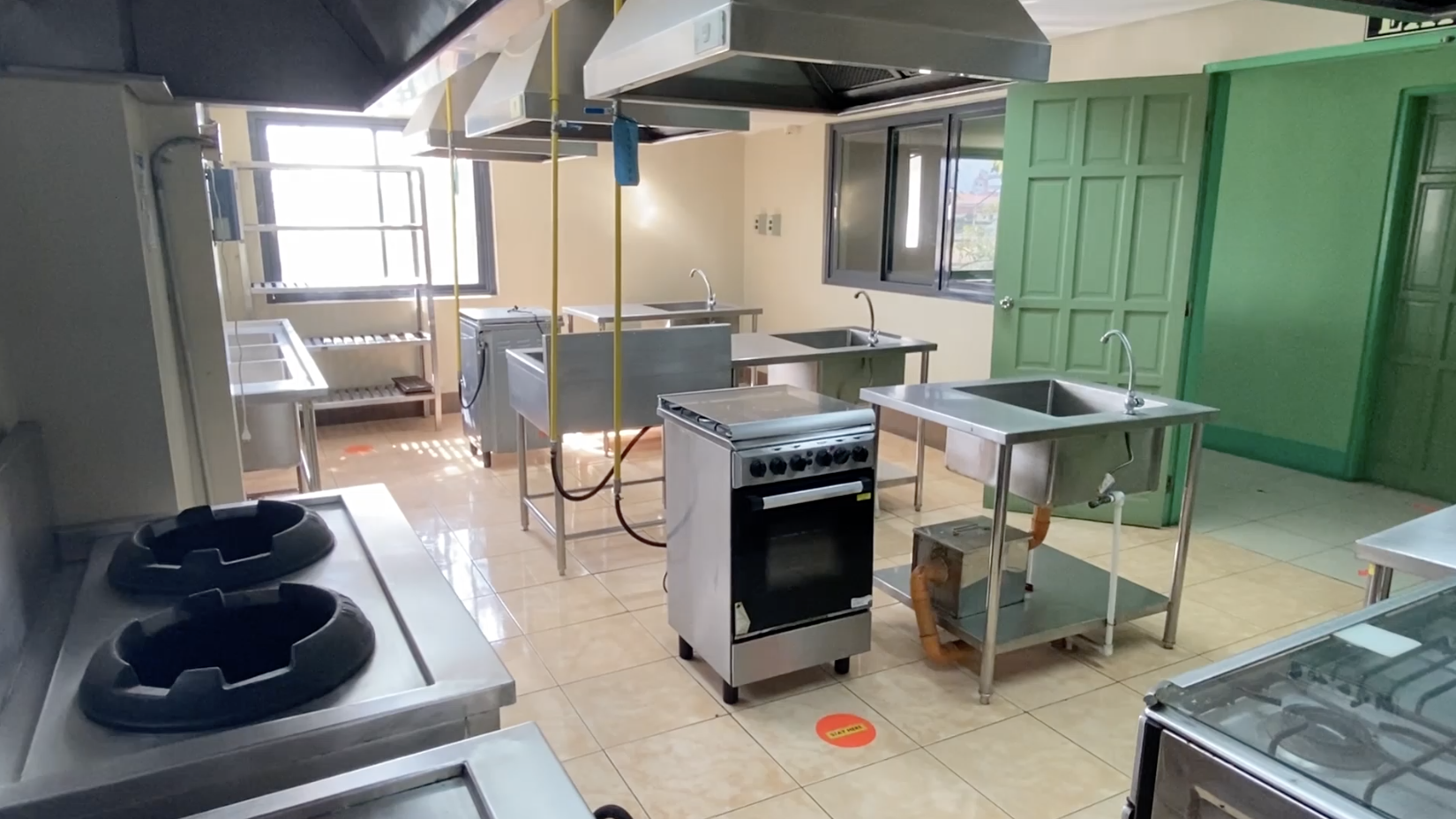
AIMS Hospitality Management Kitchen Laboratory

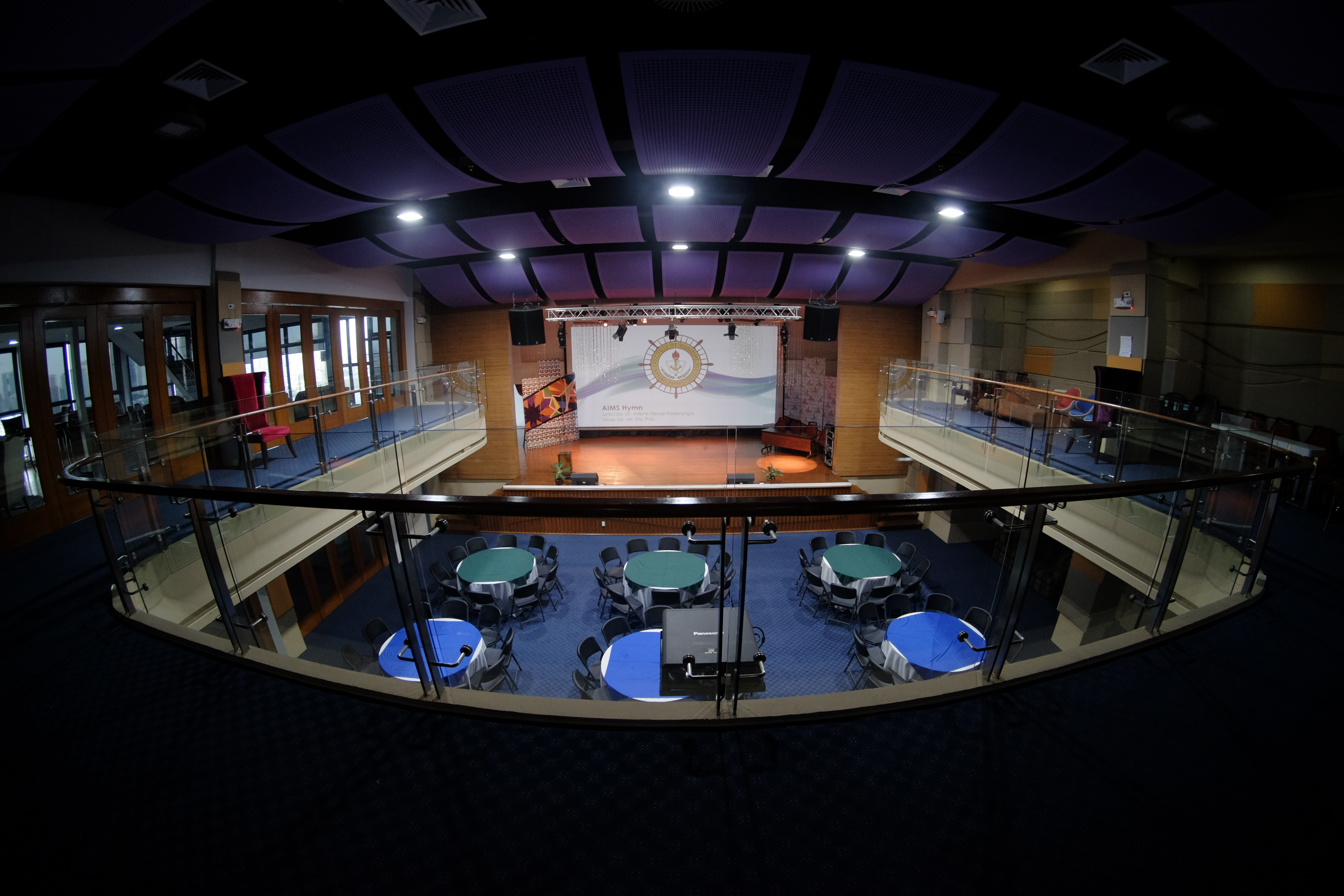
AIMS JOA Auditorium

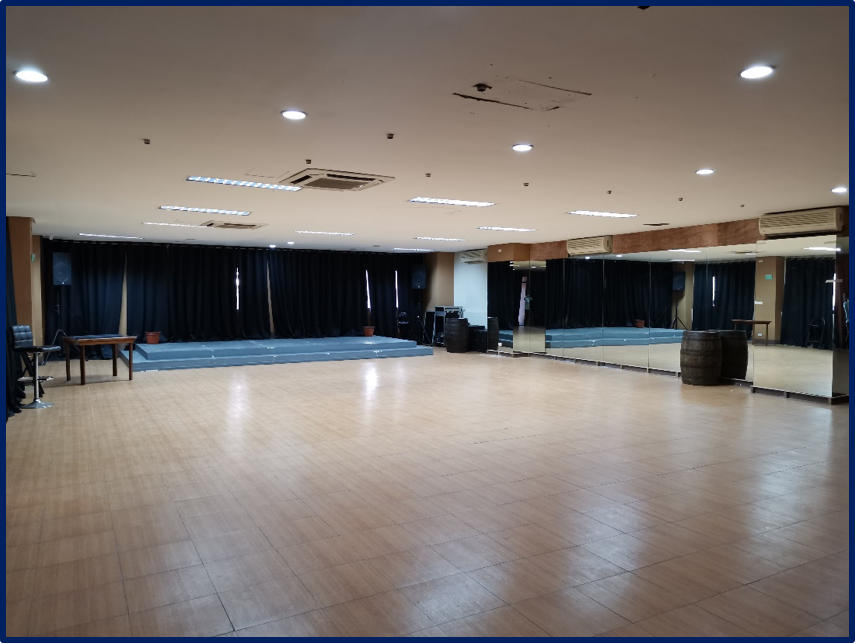
AIMS Banquet Hall

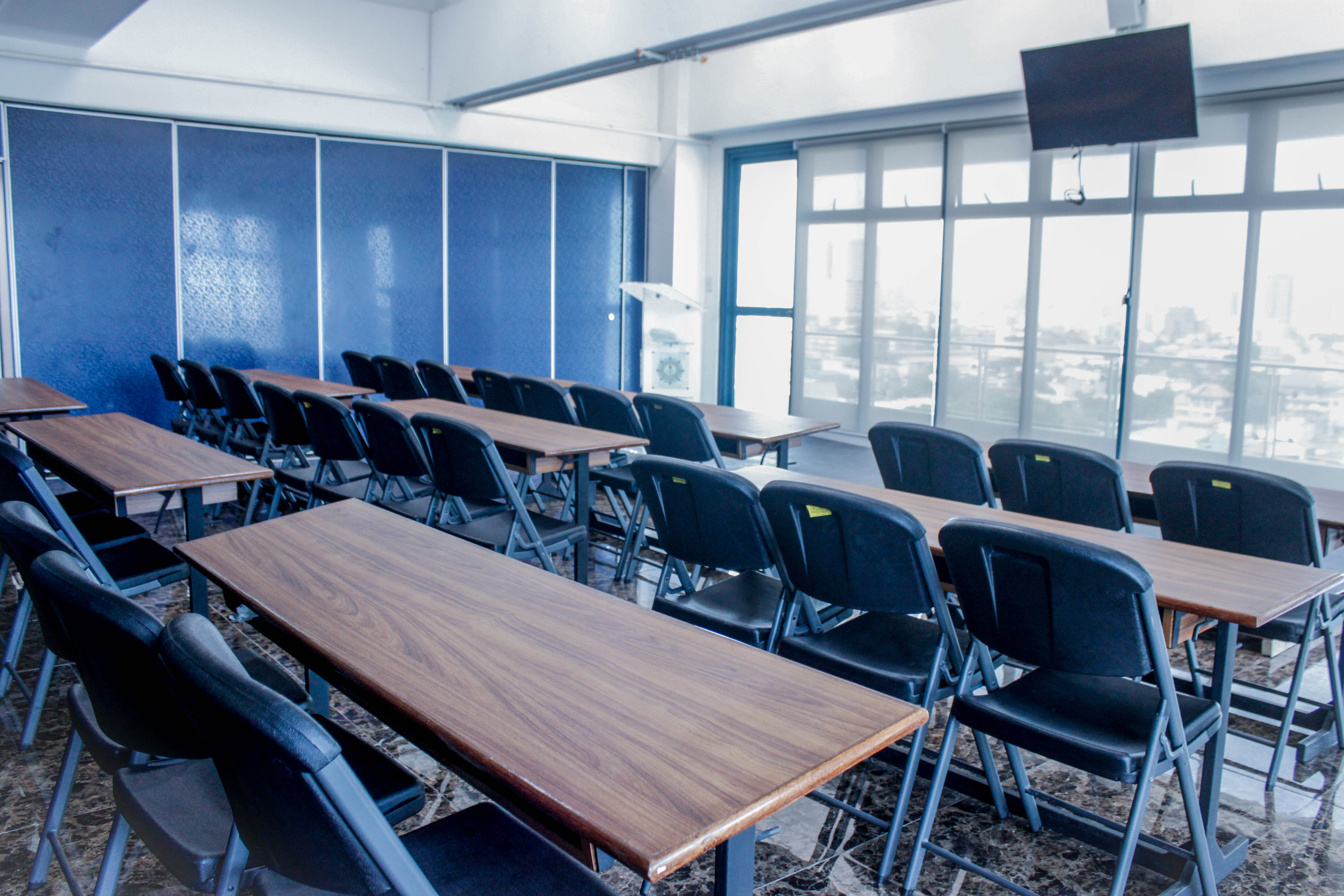
AIMS Latitude Seminar Room

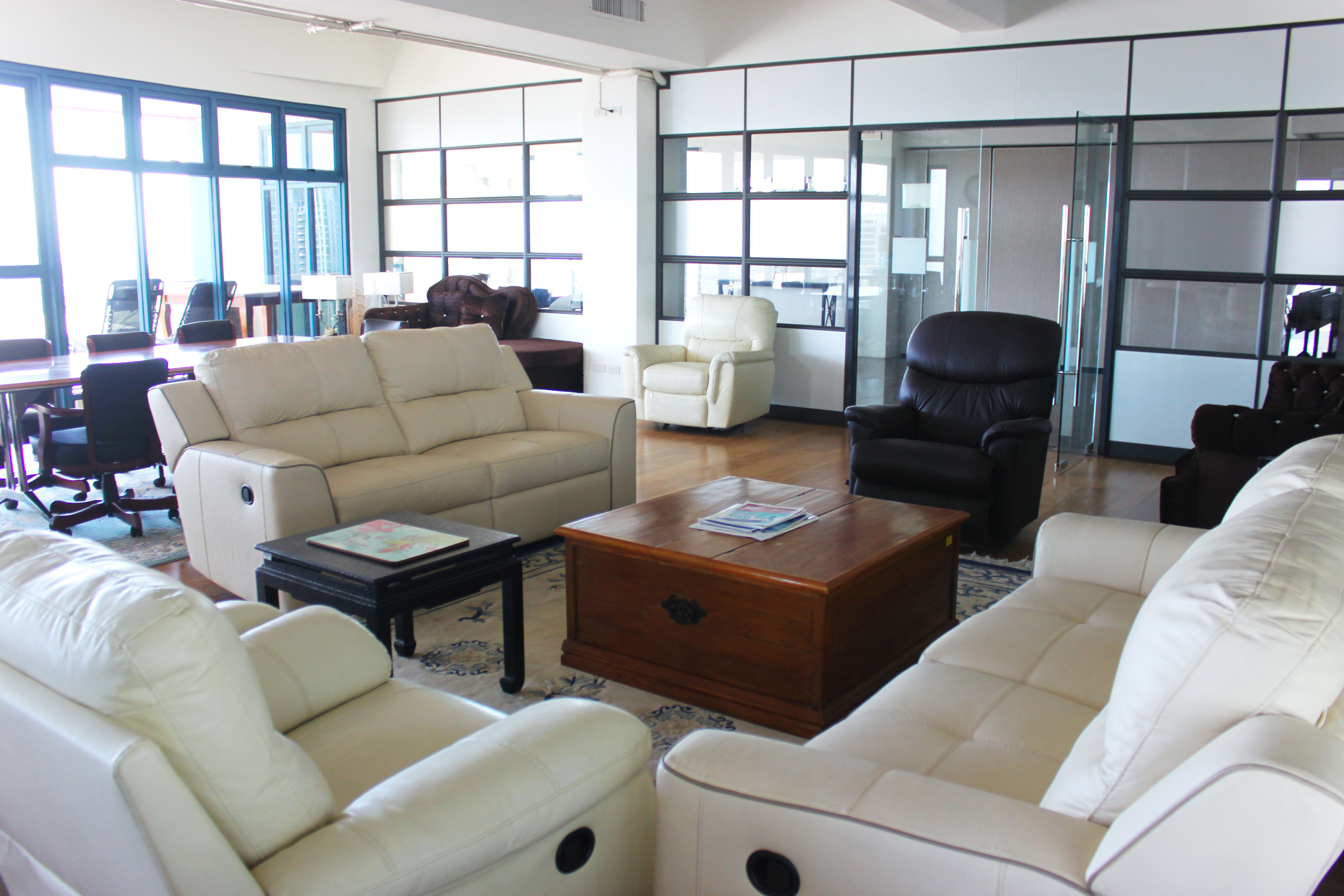
AIMS Latitude Lounge

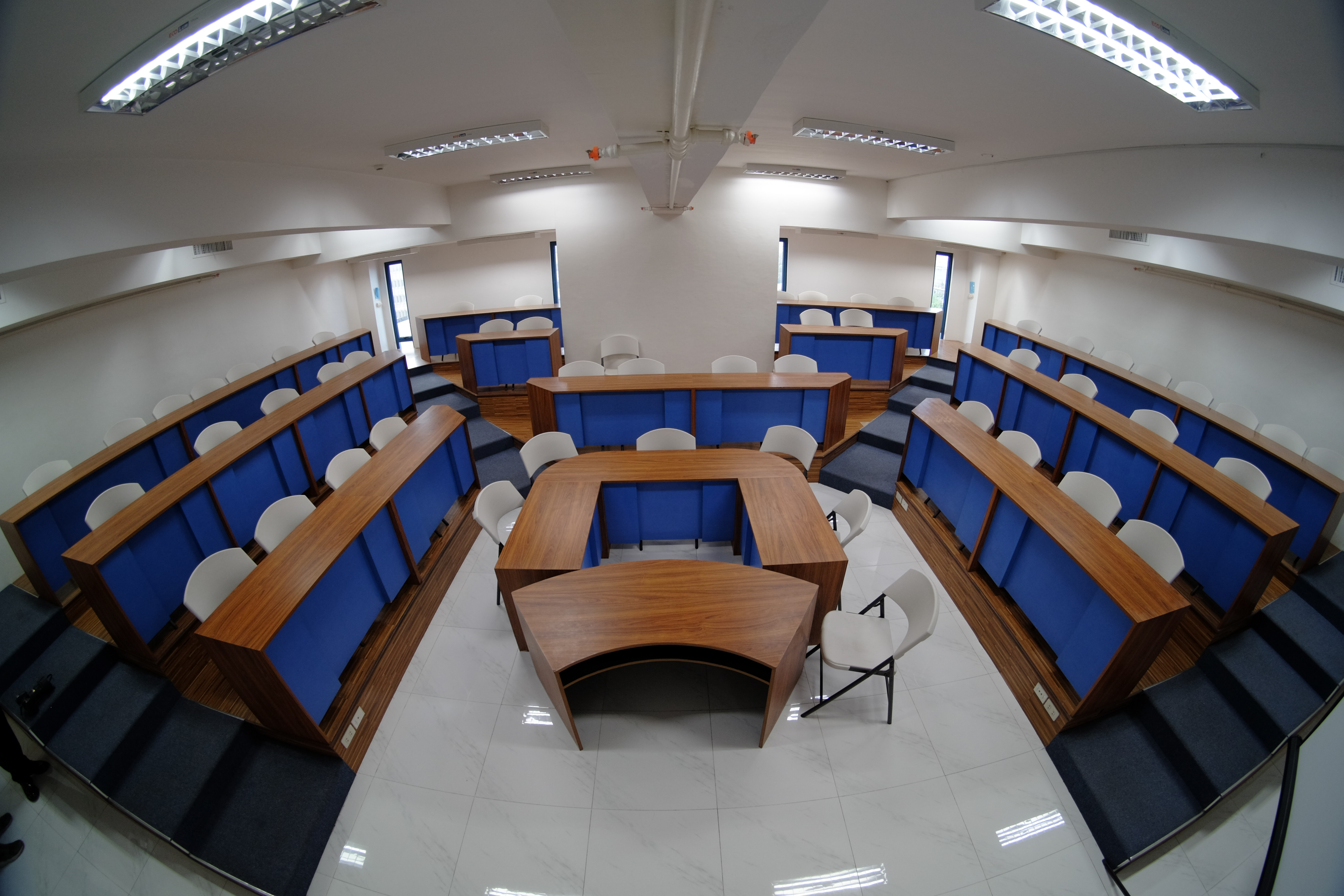
AIMS Case Room

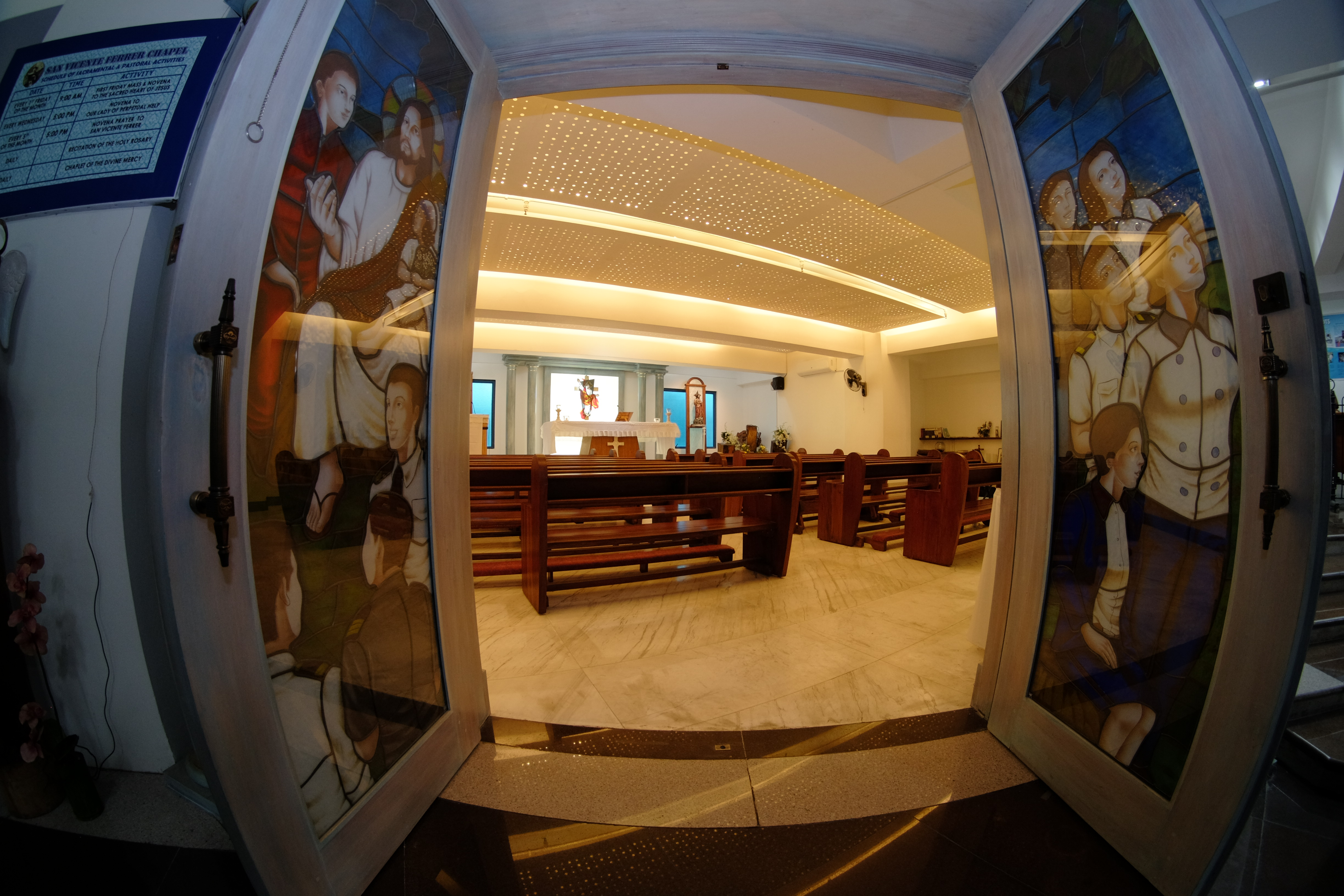
AIMS San Vicente Ferrer Chapel

== Academics ==
AIMS is composed of five schools: The School of Merchant Marine (SMM), School of Engineering and Architecture (SEA), School of Maritime Business (SMB), School of Heritage Education (SHE), and the School of Graduate Studies (SGS). It is a specialized maritime higher learning institution committed to the development of the Philippine maritime industry.

=== School of Merchant Marine (SMM) ===
The School of Merchant Marine (SMM) specializes in offshore operations and manning, maintaining rigorous standards in seafaring training and education. It provides programs leading to a Bachelor of Science in Marine Transportation (BSMT) and a Bachelor of Science in Marine Engineering (BSMarE).

=== School of Engineering and Architecture (SEA) ===
On the other hand, the School of Engineering and Architecture (SEA) specializes in onshore operations and ocean engineering. SEA covers domains including ship repair and maintenance, naval architecture and design, and port operations. Its programs include the Bachelor of Science in Naval Architecture and Marine Engineering (BSNAME), Bachelor of Science in Mechanical Engineering (BSME), Bachelor of Science in Electrical Engineering (BSEE), and Bachelor of Science in Industrial Engineering (BSECE).

=== School of Maritime Business (SMB) ===
The School of Maritime Business (SMB) offers programs such as Bachelor of Science in Customs Administration (BSCA), Bachelor of Science in Hospitality Management (BSHM), Bachelor of Science in Business Administration (BSBA), and Bachelor of Science in Computer Science (BSCS).

=== School of Heritage Education (SHE) ===
In addition to its technical programs, the School of Heritage Education (SHE) at AIMS dedicates itself to showcasing and celebrating Philippine maritime art, culture, and history through entertainment. SHE places the Philippine maritime identity within the context of culture and the arts. The school aims to professionalize the performing arts industry and support Filipino performers. It offers programs such as the Bachelor of Performing Arts majoring in Dance (BPEA Dance) or Theater (BPEA Theater).

=== School of Graduate Studies (SGS) ===
The School of Graduate Studies (SGS) specializes in maritime administration, education, and policy-making. It aims to educate professionals in the maritime industry through platforms for discussion and research. Given the critical role of competent administrators and policy-makers in the development of the Philippine maritime industry, SGS cultivates professionals dedicated to nation-building with a deep understanding of Philippine maritime history and identity. The school offers programs such as the Master's in Maritime Administration (MARAD), Master's in Customs Administration (MCA), Doctor of Philosophy in Maritime Administration, as well as diploma and certificate courses for continuous education.

== Curriculum and pedagogy ==
AIMS is a semi-military, regimented institution that instills discipline among its students throughout the campus. As a graduation requirement, cadets/students must undergo the Merchant Marine Cadetship Program (MMCP), a month-long academy-style training unique to AIMS. Each maritime cadet completes three years of academic study and a year-long Shipboard Apprenticeship Training onboard vessels. Additionally, students participate in the National Service Training Program (NSTP) 1 and 2 as mandated by Republic Act 9163, known as the NSTP Act. AIMS also offers the Aptitude for Service (AS) course, which fosters the institution's core values, appreciation to maritime history, and commitment to maritime nation-building.

== Library, archives, and museums ==
=== AIMS Library ===
The Center for Library, Archives, and Museums Services (CLAMS) at AIMS offers library, archival, and museum services to the AIMS community. The AIMS library comprises four sections: the Maritime Library located in the Lighthouse Building on Deck 5, the General Education Library in the MPC Building on Deck 2, the Graduate School Library in AIMS Tower on Deck 10, and the Engineering Library in the SEA Building on Deck 2. These sections collectively house extensive collections of books, particularly focused on maritime subjects, and are managed using the Destiny Library Management System (DLMS).

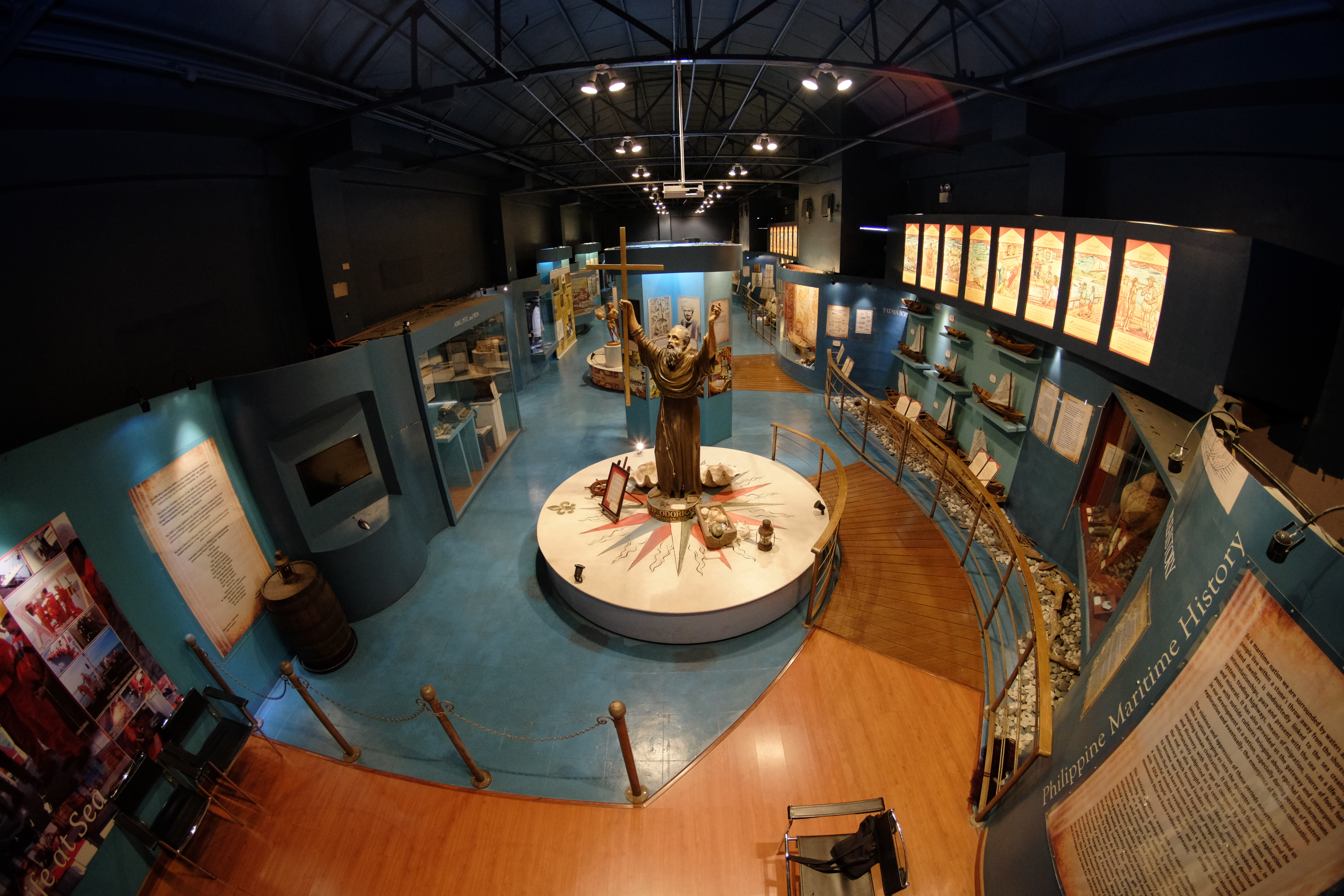
AIMS Museo Maritimo Main Exhibition

=== AIMS Museo Maritimo ===
AIMS Museo Maritimo is dedicated to the Filipino seafarers and pays homage to their contribution to nation-building from the distant past to the present. On 23 March 2012, Museo Maritimo had its grand launch at the Philippine Trade and Training Center, the first maritime-themed museum in the country, that showcases its long and rich maritime history and how it has developed through centuries. It was opened to the public on 11 October 2012. The museum is a project envisioned and initiated by its President, Mrs. Arlene Abuid-Paderanga, Ed. D., in collaboration with Hiniraya Cultural and Heritage Foundation and its partner organization ICOM Philippines. It uses interactive exhibitions and displays to illustrate what the Philippine seafaring, training, and manning history is and who its leaders are. Furthermore, it serves as a repository for valuable collections of marine art, ship models, and nautical artifacts. The museum is composed of six galleries, more than 300 items, and around 20 exhibits. It promotes not only heritage awareness, but also takes part in nation-building and knowledge generation by conducting quality research, conferences, seminars, and lectures.

== Research ==
AIMS is a maritime research institution that conducts research, conferences, seminars, and lectures. The Center for Research and Institutional Development (CRID) oversees and supports all research activities at AIMS. Among its notable publications are

- AIMS Institutional Research Journal
- AIMS School of Graduate Studies Journal
- College of Maritime Business Research Journal
- Helm & Rudder Journal
- Timon: The Proceedings of the Philippine Maritime Heritage Forum

The institution is an active member of Philippine Society for Educational Research and Evaluation (PSERE), Philippine Higher Education Research Consortium (PHERC), and the International Council of Museums Committee for University Museums and Collections (ICOM UMAC). In 2021, it published together with Dr. Joefe B. Santarita of the UP Asian Center the book "Plying the Straits: Batel Mobilities in Central Philippines" which documented the rich boat-building tradition of the Philippines. Since 2015, AIMS Museo Maritimo has been hosting the Philippine Maritime Heritage Forum. This event has featured over 50 speakers, produced approximately 15 research articles, and attracted more than 5,500 participants.

== Ranking ==
AIMS made its first appearance in the World University Ranking for Innovation (WURI) in 2024, achieving 62nd place in the Culture/Values category globally. This recognition was announced at the 4th HLU Conference held at Franklin University, Switzerland, on June 6 - 7, 2024.

== Student life ==
One of the most prominent events on campus is the annual KasaysaRun, a fun run where students promote health awareness and cultural appreciation. AIMS also has student organizations, including "Baywatch", the official student publication, and various program-specific student groups. AIMSians participate in extracurricular activities such as water paddling, swimming, and various sports, supported by numerous student organizations.
