= Universities and Colleges Athletic Association =

Athletic association of colleges and universities in the Philippines

The Universities and Colleges Athletic Association (UCAA) is an athletic association of colleges and universities in the Philippines. It was established in August 20, 2002 and was headed by its president Art Onas. The season is usually held during the first semester of the school year, which regularly starts from August to October.

== Member schools ==
Locations of NAASCU member schools in Metro Manila, except Philippine Nautical and Technical College, which is in Cavite

Institution	Nickname	Type	Founded	Color	Location
Olivarez College	OC Sea Lions	Private	1976	Gold, Red and Green	Sucat Rd., Parañaque
Manuel L. Quezon University	MLQU Stallions	Private	1947	White and Maroon	Manila
Philippine School of Business Administration	PSBA Jaguars	Private	1963	Blue and Gold	Sampaloc, Manila
Philippine Nautical and Technical College	PNTC Barracudas	Private	1982		Dasmariñas, Cavite
Rizal Technological University	RTU Blue Thunder	Public	1969	Blue and Gold	Mandaluyong
Trinity University of Asia	TUA Stallions	Private	1963	White and Green	Quezon City

== Former members ==
Locations of some of the former NAASCU member schools

Institution	Nickname	Status	Founded	Color	Location
Central Colleges of the Philippines	CCP Bobcats	Private	1954	Crimson and Gold	Quezon City
De La Salle University-Dasmariñas	DLSU-D Patriots	Private	1987	Green and White	Dasmariñas, Cavite
National College of Business and Arts	NCBA Wildcats	Private	1967	White and Green	Quezon City
Saint Francis of Assisi College System	SFACS Doves	Private	1981	Red and White	Las Piñas
Emilio Aguinaldo College	EAC Generals	Private	1973	Red and White	Ermita, Manila
Las Piñas College	LPC Pink Lions	Private	1975	Blue	Las Piñas
Asian College of Science and Technology	ACSAT Lightnings	Private		Blue and Gold	Aurora Blvd., Quezon City
Colegio de Sta. Monica	CSM Cougars	Private	2004	Yellow and Red	Las Piñas
Trace College Laguna	TCL Red Stallions	Private		Red	Los Baños, Laguna
Technological Institute of the Philippines	TIP Engineers	Private	1962	Gold and Black	Quiapo, Manila
Emilio Aguinaldo College-Dasmariñas	EAC-D Generals	Private	1973	Red and White	Dasmariñas, Cavite
Universal College of Nursing	UCN Dragons	Private	2005		Parañaque

== UCAA Basketball Champions ==
- 2002: St Francis Doves def. PSBA-QC Jaguars
- 2003: St Francis Doves def. PSBA-QC Jaguars
- 2004: EAC Generals def. PSBA-QC Jaguars
- 2005: EAC Generals def. DLSU-D Patriots
- 2006: EAC Generals def. St Francis Doves
- 2007: St Francis Doves def. ACSAT Lightnings
- 2008: UCN Dragons def. EAC Generals
- 2009: UCN Dragons def. CSM Cougars
- 2010: CSM Cougars def. TIP Engineers
- 2011: PSBA-QC JAGUARS def. Olivarez College Sea Lions
- 2012: Olivarez College Sea Lions def. DLSU-D Patriots
- 2013: Rizal Techonogical University def. Olivarez College
