= Malaysia National Basketball League =

Former men's basketball league in Malaysia

Malaysia National Basketball League (MNBL)
- Sport: Basketball
- Founded: 1981
- First season: 1981
- Folded: 2013
- CEO: Tan Kee Hian (陳其賢) (2002–2011); Ranndy Yap (2012–2013)
- President: Tan Kang Yong (MABA)
- Country: Malaysia
- Continent: FIBA Asia (Asia)
- Last champion: Kelantan Warriors (1st title)
- Most titles: Melaka Chinwoo (3 titles)
- Level on pyramid: 1

The Malaysia National Basketball League (Petronas-Molten Malaysia National Basketball League for sponsorship reason), often abbreviated to the MNBL, was the pre-eminent men's basketball league in Malaysia, organised by the Malaysia Basketball Association (MABA). The competition started as Malaysian Basketball League (MBL) in 1981. In 2002, MABA appointed Mr. Tan Kee Hian (simplified Chinese: 陈其贤; traditional Chinese: 陳其賢; pinyin: chén qí xián) to handle the competition and changed the league's name to Malaysia National Basketball League (MNBL).

MNBL commissioner Tan Kee Hian announced on 24 July 2011, after the grand final of 2011 MNBL, that they would take a break from the privately owned national league "after 10 years of struggling to keep the league afloat due to the lack of sponsors and teams".

In 2017, a new national league named the Malaysia Pro League (MPL) was established as a replacement for the Malaysia National Basketball League.

== Clubs ==
Five teams have competed in the 2013 Malaysia National Basketball League season:

State	Club	Founded	City	Venue
(Sarawak)	Bintulu Eagles	2013	Bintulu	Bintulu Indoor Basketball Court
(Kelantan)	Kelantan Warriors	2013	Kota Bharu	Chung Hwa Indoor Stadium
(Perak)	Perak Farmcochem	2003	Ipoh	Indera Mulia Stadium
(Sarawak)	Sarawak Fire Horse	2011	Miri	Miri Indoor Stadium
(Kuala Lumpur)	Westports Malaysia Dragons	2009	Kuala Lumpur	MABA Stadium

== Older defunct clubs ==
State	Club	Active years	City
(Kuala Lumpur)	Cheras Hokkien Association	2002–05	Cheras
(Malaysia)	Crouching Tigers (Malaysia National Junior Team)	2012	Kuala Lumpur
(Singapore)	Eng Tat Hornets	2004	Singapore
(Selangor)	Kuala Langat Basketball Association	2005	Kuala Langat
(Kuala Lumpur)	Kuala Lumpur Basketball Association	2005	Kuala Lumpur
(Kuala Lumpur)	Kuala Lumpur Tanamas	2002	Kuala Lumpur
(Malacca)	Melaka Chinwoo	2006–09	Malacca City
(Penang)	Penang Stallions	2012	George Town
(Malaysia)	Petronas Junior	2003	Kuala Lumpur
(Negeri Sembilan)	Port Dickson Basketball	2002–04	Port Dickson
(Sabah)	Sabah Kinsabina Group	2010	Penampang
(Sarawak)	Sarawak Rainbow	2007–10	Bintulu
(Johor)	Segamat Basketball Association	2004–09	Segamat
(Selangor)	Selangor SM Land	2003–04, 2006–08	Shah Alam
(Singapore)	Singapore Siglap	2011	Singapore
(Selangor)	State Pets	2002	Petaling

=== Defunct date unknown ===
- (Kuala Lumpur) Good Will Sports Club
- (Kuala Lumpur) Pandan Jaya Sports Club
- Perak Red Eagles
- (Kuala Lumpur) Petronas Basketball Team
- (Selangor) PKNS B.C.
- Sarawak Hornbills
- (Johor) Segamat Rimba Timor
- Selangor Basketball Association
- Selangor Dragons

== League champions ==
=== Malaysian Basketball League (MBL) era ===
Year	Champions	Runners-up	Third Place
1981	Selangor Basketball Association		
1982			
1983			
1984	(Selangor) PKNS B.C.		
1985			
1986			
1987			
1988	(Kuala Lumpur) Pandan Jaya Sports Club		
1989			
1990	(Kuala Lumpur) Good Will Sports Club		
1991			
1992	Johor Tigers B.C.		
1993			
1994			
1995	(Kuala Lumpur) Petronas Basketball Team		
1996	(Kuala Lumpur) Petronas Basketball Team		
1997	(Kuala Lumpur) Petronas Basketball Team		
1998	(Kuala Lumpur) Petronas Basketball Team		
1999	(Kuala Lumpur) Petronas Basketball Team		
2000	(Kuala Lumpur) Petronas Basketball Team		
2001	(Kuala Lumpur) Petronas Basketball Team		

=== Malaysia National Basketball League (MNBL) era ===
Year	Champions	Runners-up	Third Place
2002	Kuala Lumpur Tanamas	(Negeri Sembilan) Port Dickson Basketball	
2003	(Negeri Sembilan) Port Dickson Basketball	Selangor SM Land	
2004	(Johor) Segamat Basketball Association	(Kuala Lumpur) Cheras Hokkien Association	
2005	(Kuala Lumpur) Cheras Hokkien Association	(Selangor) Kuala Langat Basketball Association	
2006	(Johor) Segamat Basketball Association	(Malacca) Melaka Chinwoo	
2007	(Malacca) Melaka Chinwoo	Selangor SM Land	
2008	(Malacca) Melaka Chinwoo	Perak Farmcochem	
2009	(Malacca) Melaka Chinwoo	(Sarawak) Bintulu Rainbow	
2010	Kuala Lumpur Dragons	Sarawak Rainbow	
2011	(Sarawak) Miri Fire Horse	Perak Farmcochem	
2012	Perak Farmcochem	Kuala Lumpur Dragons	
2013	Kelantan Warriors	Perak Farmcochem	Sarawak Fire Horse

== Champions Cup winners ==
=== Malaysian Basketball League (MBL) era ===
Year	Champions	Final Score	Runners-up
1981			
1982			
1983			
1984			
1985			
1986			
1987			
1988			
1989			
1990			
1991			
1992			
1993			
1994			
1995			
1996			
1997			
1998			
1999			
2000			
2001	(Kuala Lumpur) Petronas Basketball Team		
2002	(Kuala Lumpur) Petronas Basketball Team		
2003	(Kuala Lumpur) Petronas Basketball Team		
2004	(Kuala Lumpur) Petronas Basketball Team		
2005			

=== Malaysia National Basketball League (MNBL) era ===
Year	Champions	Final Score	Runners-up
2006	(Johor) Segamat Basketball Association	81-75	(Malacca) Melaka Chinwoo
2007	Selangor SM Land	95-82	(Malacca) Melaka Chinwoo
2008	(Malacca) Melaka Chinwoo	94-67	Perak Farmcochem
2009	(Sarawak) Bintulu Rainbow	80-72	(Malacca) Melaka Chinwoo
2010	Kuala Lumpur Dragons	76-59	Perak Farmcochem
2011	(Sarawak) Miri Fire Horse	74-73	Perak Farmcochem
2012	Perak Farmcochem	82-78	Kuala Lumpur Dragons
2013	Kelantan Warriors	78-58	Perak Farmcochem

== Most Valuable Player (MVP) ==
Season	Player	Club
2006	(Malaysia) Tan Kian Hoong	(Johor) Segamat Basketball Association
2007	(Cameroon) Chris Kuete	Selangor SM Land
2008	(Malaysia) B. Guganeswarran	(Malacca) Melaka Chinwoo
2009	(Cameroon) Chris Kuete	(Sarawak) Bintulu Rainbow
2010	N/A	N/A
2011	N/A	N/A
2012	N/A	N/A
2013	(Cameroon) Chris Kuete	Perak Farmcochem

== Foreign players/coaches ==
- Perak Farmcochem
  - (Scotland) Gareth John Murray (2009)
  - (Republic of Ireland) Jason Killeen (2010)
  - (United States) Raymond Canady Jr. (2009)
  - (Cameroon) Chris Kuete (2011–13)
  - (United States) Bryson McKenzie (2011)
  - (Cameroon) Gaston Essengue (2011)
  - (United States) Chris Garnett (2012)
  - (United States) Lashawn Monteze Malloy (2013)
- Sarawak Rainbow
  - (Cameroon) Chris Kuete (2009)
  - (United States) Matthew R. Smith (2010)
  - (United States) Kenny Harris (2009)
  - (Nigeria) Samuel Emany Meka (2007–08)
  - (Bahrain) Abdul Rahman Taher (2007–08)
- Kuala Lumpur Dragons
  - (United States) Alex Hartman (2010)
  - (United States) Donnie Stith (2010)
  - (United States) Waki Williams (2011)
  - (United States) Anthony Michael Kent (2011)
  - (Philippines) Richard Alonzo (2011)
  - (Philippines) (Tonga) Moala Tautuaa (2012)
  - (Philippines) Patrick Cabahug (2012)
  - (Philippines) (United States) Avery Scharer (2013)
  - (United States) Travis Ernest Darnell Hyman (2013)
- Sabah Kinsabina Group
  - (United States) Marcus T. Robinson (2010)
  - (United States) Christoher Allen Baldwin (2010)
- (Malacca) Melaka Chinwoo
  - (Australia) Ben Knight (2009)
  - (Philippines) Disney Jay Gabonada (2007–08)
  - (Nigeria) Tom Ode Ochefu (2007–08)
- (Johor) Segamat Basketball Association
  - (United States) Amani Bin Daanish (2009)
- Selangor SM Land
  - (Cameroon) Chris Kuete (2007–08)
- Singapore Siglap
  - (Philippines) Al Vergara (2011)
  - (United States) Antoine Broxsie (2011)
- Sarawak Fire Horse
  - (United States) Gene Anthony Johnson (2011–13)
  - (United States) Nathaniel Michael Pilgrim (2011)
  - (Australia) Mark Musgrave (2011)
  - (United States) Devon Sullivan (2012)
  - (United States) Robert Jones (2013)
  - (United States) Benson Andrew Lee (2013)
  - (Croatia) Goran Veg (2013)
- Penang Stallions
  - (United States) Philip Turner (2012)
  - (United States) Uche Echefu (2012)
- Kelantan Warriors
  - (United States) Jonathan Bruce Kreft (2013)
  - (United States) Devon Sullivan (2013)
  - (United States) Kelvin McNeil Jr. (2013)
- (Sarawak) Bintulu Eagles
  - (United States) Raymond Canady Jr. (2013)
  - (United States) Caleb Patterson (2013)
  - (United States) Philip Turner (2013)
- Sarawak Rainbow
  - (Philippines) Arturo "Bai" Cristobal
- Kuala Lumpur Dragons
  - (Philippines) Paul Daniel Advincula
  - (United States) Joseph Dolcetti
  - (Philippines) Ariel Vanguardia (2011–13)
- Sabah Kinsabina Group
  - (Philippines) Hilario P. Galabin Jr.
- (Malacca) Melaka Chinwoo
  - (Philippines) David Zamar
- Selangor SM Land
  - (Philippines) Paul Daniel Advincula
- Perak Farmcochem
  - (Philippines) Paul Daniel Advincula (2011–12)
  - (Philippines) Antolin Zamar (2013)
- Sarawak Fire Horse
  - (Philippines) Nomar Isla (2011–13)
  - (United States) Adam James Steere (2013)
- Singapore Siglap
  - (Singapore) Neo Nam Kheng (2011)
- (Sarawak) Bintulu Eagles
  - (Philippines) Adriano Papa Jr. (2013)
