= Eliud Poligrates =

Filipino basketball player (born 1987)

Personal information
- Born: November 29, 1987 (age 38) Poro, Cebu, Philippines
- Listed height: 6 ft 0 in (1.83 m)
- Listed weight: 185 lb (84 kg)

Career information
- College: Southwestern University
- PBA draft: 2013: 3rd round, 27th overall pick
- Drafted by: Talk 'N Text Tropang Texters
- Playing career: 2009–2021
- Position: Point guard

Career history
- 2009: MLKP-Cebu Niños
- 2010: Mandaue-Cebu Landmasters
- 2011: Misamis Oriental Meteors
- 2013: Cagayan Rising Suns
- 2013–2014: Talk 'N Text Tropang Texters
- 2014: Air21 Express
- 2014–2015: Kia Carnival
- 2015: Cafe France Bakers
- 2019: Cebu Sharks
- 2019: Marinerong Pilipino Skippers
- 2019: Valenzuela XUR Homes Realty Inc.
- 2020: Rizal Golden Coolers
- 2021: ALZA-Alayon Zamboanga del Sur

Career highlights
- PBA D-League champion (2015 Foundation); PBA D-League MVP (2019 Foundation); Liga Pilipinas champion (Conference III; 2009)

Eliud G. Poligrates (born November 29, 1987), also known as Eloy Poligrates, is a Filipino former professional basketball player. He played three years of college basketball for Southwestern University, which ended with his lifetime ban from the CESAFI due to moonlighting in another league. He then played in Liga Pilipinas and the PBA D-League before he was drafted by the Talk 'N Text Tropang Texters in the 2013 Philippine Basketball Association (PBA) draft. He later played for PBA teams Air21 Express and Kia Carnival. Poligrates found success in his return to the PBA D-League, winning the 2015 Foundation Cup championship with the Cafe France Bakers and the 2019 Foundation Cup Most Valuable Player (MVP) award with Marinerong Pilipino. He also holds the record for the most points scored in a single PBA D-League game, with 67.

Poligrates also had stints in the Pilipinas Commercial Basketball League (PCBL), Maharlika Pilipinas Basketball League (MPBL), and the Pilipinas VisMin Super Cup.

== Career ==
=== College career ===
Poligrates' first basketball tournaments were in local leagues in his hometown the Camotes Islands, as well as nearby Danao. He was scouted by the Cebu City-based Southwestern University (SWU) Cobras of the Cebu Schools Athletic Foundation Inc. (CESAFI). However, his three-year career at SWU ended in 2009 when he was caught moonlighting in a local league, generically referred to as ligang labas. The offense, and his initial denial of it, led to a lifetime ban from the CESAFI, despite his school's appeal.

=== Liga Pilipinas and PBA D-League ===
Poligrates then played in Liga Pilipinas, initially for Cebu-based team M. Lhuillier-Cebu Niños, with whom he won the Conference III championship in 2009. Afterwards, he moved to neighboring team Mandaue-Cebu Landmasters before joining the Misamis Oriental Meteors. He then had the opportunity to play in Manila for the Cagayan Rising Suns of the PBA D-League. The Rising Suns had scouted him in another ligang labas.

=== Philippine Basketball Association (PBA) ===
In the 2013 PBA draft, Poligrates was selected by the Talk 'N Text Tropang Texters with the 27th overall pick. He scored 13 points on his PBA debut, an 89–80 win over the Meralco Bolts at the Cebu Coliseum. Shortly before the end of 2013–14 PBA Philippine Cup elimination round, he and teammate Sean Anthony were traded to Air21 Express in exchange for KG Canaleta.

On November 27, 2014, he was again traded to Kia Sorento in exchange for Rudy Lingganay.

=== PBA D-League championship and MVP; stints in other leagues ===
In April 2015, Poligrates was signed by Euro-Med Laboratories of the Pilipinas Commercial Basketball League (PCBL) after a six-month absence from commercial basketball. In his debut with the team, he scored 17 points in their 93–81 win over the Foton Toplanders.

Later that year, he returned to the PBA D-League with the Cafe France Bakers. In June 2015, the Bakers won their first PBA D-League title over favorites Hapee Fresh Fighters in the 2015 Foundation Cup finals. After his stint with Cafe France, he played ligang labas in Visayas and Mindanao for around four years.

In April 2019, Poligrates was signed by hometown team Cebu City Sharks for the 2019–20 season of the Maharlika Pilipinas Basketball League (MPBL). However, he left the Sharks by mutual consent in August, after being sanctioned for training with Marinerong Pilipino of the PBA D-League despite having a contract with the Sharks. With Marinerong Pilipino, Poligrates set the PBA D-League record for most points scored in a game, scoring 67 points in their 141–97 win over the iWalk Chargers on August 26, 2019. In the 2019 Foundation Cup, he led Marinerong Pilipino to a sweep of the elimination round followed by their first Finals appearance. Averaging 21 points, 3.1 rebounds, and 3.0 assists, he earned the conference's Most Valuable Player (MVP) award. However, they lost to BRT Sumisip Basilan-St. Clare in game 3 of the best of three finals series.

In November 2019, Poligrates returned to the MPBL with Valenzuela City but played only four games for them. In March 2020, he joined fellow MPBL team Rizal Golden Coolers. In 2021, he played for ALZA-Alayon Zamboanga del Sur of the Pilipinas VisMin Super Cup.

== PBA career statistics ==
Legend
GP	Games played	MPG	Minutes per game
FG%	Field-goal percentage	3P%	3-point field-goal percentage	FT%	Free-throw percentage
RPG	Rebounds per game	APG	Assists per game	SPG	Steals per game
BPG	Blocks per game	PPG	Points per game	**Bold**	Career high

=== Season-by-season averages ===
Year	Team	GP	MPG	FG%	3P%	FT%	RPG	APG	SPG	BPG	PPG
2013–14	Talk 'N Text / Air21	**33**	12.2	**.415**	**.273**	.533	**1.5**	.7	.2	.0	**4.2**
2014–15	Kia	11	**13.5**	.340	.160	**.667**	**1.5**	**1.4**	**.4**	.0	3.8
Career		44	12.5	.394	.237	.556	1.5	.9	.3	.0	4.1

== Personal life ==
In 2016, Poligrates and seven other individuals were sued by two men for physical injuries. They were allegedly involved in a brawl during a fiesta in his hometown, the Camotes Islands, back in October that year. On January 14, 2020, Poligrates was arrested for allegedly assaulting his ex-girlfriend outside a convenience store in Cebu City. He was released later that month after the ex-girlfriend recanted her accusation through an affidavit. She explained that they had a verbal argument, but Poligrates did not harm her physically.

On May 30, 2023, Poligrates was shot on his left shoulder by a 15-year-old boy in Duljo Fatima, Cebu City. According to Poligrates, the boy shot him after he turned down the boy's solicitation of ₱20. Meanwhile, the boy claimed he retaliated against Poligrates, who allegedly choked him the week before. Poligrates proceeded to file charges against the boy.
