= Mark Andaya =

Filipino basketball player (born 1981)

Personal information
- Born: March 22, 1981 (age 45)
- Listed height: 6 ft 9 in (2.06 m)
- Listed weight: 245 lb (111 kg)

Career information
- High school: Adamson (Manila)
- College: Letran
- PBA draft: 2006: 1st round, 8th overall pick
- Drafted by: Talk 'N Text Phone Pals
- Playing career: 2006–2019
- Position: Center

Career history
- 2006–2007: Talk 'N Text Phone Pals
- 2007: Air21 Express
- 2007–2008: Red Bull Barako
- 2008–2009: Rain or Shine Elasto Painters
- 2009–2010: Philippine Patriots
- 2010: Misamis Oriental Meteors
- 2010–2011: Barako Bull Energy Boosters
- 2012: Barako Bull Energy
- 2012: Air21 Express
- 2018: Valenzuela Classic
- 2018: Mandaluyong El Tigre
- 2018–2019: Pasig Pirates

Career highlights
- ABL champion (2010); MPBL All-Star (2019); NCAA Philippines champion (2005)

Mark Anthony Gozar Andaya (born March 22, 1981), also known as "Big Mac" or "Big Mak", is a Filipino former professional basketball player. He was drafted eighth overall by Talk 'N Text in the 2006 PBA draft. After playing for the Philippine Patriots in the ASEAN Basketball League, he was acquired by the Barako Bull Energy Boosters. He also had a brief stint with the Misamis Oriental Meteors in the Liga Pilipinas and then played for several MPBL teams.

Andaya's first acting role was in the film On the Job. He has had other roles in films and teleseryes such as FPJ's Ang Probinsyano, Fantastica, and Hello Universe!

== Early life ==
Andaya is the youngest son of Primitvo Andaya, a businessman from Calapan, Mindoro, and Ma. Corona Gozar, a Spanish professor at Adamson University. He grew up in Manila, with four brothers and four sisters. When he was two years old, their father died. Although they grew up poor, their mother worked hard to provide for them and keep them out of trouble.

Andaya studied at Rafael Palma Elementary School. There he became the editor of his school's newspaper, played the bandurria in his school's rondalla, and won awards in painting and drawing contests. He also learned how to play basketball on the streets.

== College career ==
After transferring from MLQU, Andaya played for the Letran Knights, who had just won the Season 79 title. In his NCAA debut he scored 11 points in a win over the PCU Dolphins. He then scored 14 points in a win over the San Beda Red Lions. In their rematch, he dominated over them once again with a career-high 25 points. In the first game of the Final Four against the Dolphins, he scored 14 points before Jonathan Aldave nailed a three-pointer with 3.2 seconds left to seize the win. The Dolphins however bounced back in the do-or-die Game 2 to defeat the Knights as they went on to win the title.

The following season, Letran went 13–1 in its title bid. Andaya led the league in blocks while averaging double digits in both points and rebounds. They faced the Dolphins once again, this time in the finals. In his last season with the Knights, they were able to give Letran their 16th NCAA basketball title.

== Professional career ==
=== Talk 'N Text Phone Pals ===
Andaya was drafted 8th overall in the 2006 PBA Draft by the Talk 'N Text Phone Pals.

=== Air21 Express ===
Before the start of the 2006–07 Philippine Cup playoffs, Andaya and Abe Santos were traded to the Air21 Express for Leo Avenido and Yancy de Ocampo.

=== Red Bull Barako ===
After his stay with Air21, Andaya joined the Red Bull Barako. He was inserted into the lineup after Junthy Valenzuela was traded from the team for draft picks. He then got to play in the Rookies vs Sophomore game during the 2008 PBA All-Star Weekend. Before the 2008 Fiesta Conference quarterfinals, he was released as Red Bull signed Reed Juntilla.

=== Rain or Shine Elasto Painters ===
During the 2008 PBA Draft, Andaya was acquired by the Rain or Shine Elasto Painters.

=== Philippine Patriots ===
In 2009, Andaya joined the Philippine Patriots in the ASEAN Basketball League (ABL). They finished 11–4 in the regular season and swept the playoffs, winning the Philippines its first ABL title.

=== Misamis Oriental Meteors ===
Andaya then played for the Misamis Oriental Meteors in the Liga Pilipinas.

=== Barako Bull Energy Boosters ===
Andaya was set to return for another tour in the ABL with the Philippine Patriots, but when the Barako Bull Energy Boosters offered him a slot on their roster, he left the Patriots before their opening game. In his first two games, he quickly totaled nine blocks. He was second in the league in blocks, with 1.6 per game.

On January 20, 2011, the management of the Energy Boosters announced that they would take a leave of absence for the 2011 Commissioner's Cup to make way for the Smart Gilas Philippine national team. Andaya and the other players were put into a dispersal draft. He and Jason Misolas were not picked, making them free agents (although Barako held their rights until another team signed them).

=== Barako Bull Energy ===
Andaya tried out for the Barangay Ginebra Kings. He eventually found his way to the Barako Bull Energy (not to be confused with the Energy Boosters) and played just two games for them.

=== Air21 Express ===
After his contract expired, Andaya played in ligang labas games all over the country. After one game in Cebu, he was signed for the 2012–13 Philippine Cup by the Air21 Express. He would play in only two games for them.

=== KIA Sorento ===
Andaya resumed playing in ligang labas games and also did stints as an import in low-level Southeast Asian leagues. In 2014, Andaya signed a contract to play for the KIA Sorento. However, he never got to play for KIA in an official PBA game for them and was a practice player for them instead. His contract expired for them a year later.

=== Valenzuela Classic ===
Andaya then focused on running for city councilor and his acting career and retired from professional basketball. He also played in the semi-pro Marikina City Basketball League in 2017.

In 2018, Andaya got a call to play for the Valenzuela Classic of the Maharlika Pilipinas Basketball League (MPBL). He tried out for them and made his return to professional basketball. He was able to lead the Classic to the playoffs.

During his stint with Valenzuela, Andaya also played in the PBA D-League for the AMA Online Education Titans while still doing acting roles. In 2019, he returned the Valenzuela Classic, but for their 3x3 team in the Chooks-to-Go Pilipinas 3x3.

=== Mandaluyong El Tigre ===
After playing for Valenzuela, Andaya stayed in the MPBL and joined the Mandaluyong El Tigre.

=== Pasig Pirates ===
Andaya then played for the Pasig Pirates. He was selected as an All-Star reserve for the MPBL All-Star Game that season.

== Other ventures ==
=== Acting ===
In 2013, Andaya played a prison inmate named Simeon who fights hitman Daniel Benitez (Gerald Anderson) in the critically acclaimed film On the Job. His performance led to him getting a 10-year acting contract. He then got to act alongside Marian Rivera in the GMA series Super Ma'am.

In 2019, Andaya appeared on It's Showtime! on the segment "KapareWho Surprise".

In 2023, Andaya was seen in the basketball film Hello Universe! He also played "Tanos", one of Tanggol's (Coco Martin) childhood friends in the action series FPJ's Batang Quiapo.

=== Politics ===
In October 2013, Andaya ran for barangay captain but lost.

In 2016, Andaya ran for a council seat in the fifth district of Manila under former Manila mayor Alfredo Lim's party. However, he didn't receive enough votes to gain a spot in the council.

Since 2023, Andaya has served as one of the 30 board members of the MTRCB, the government's media regulatory board.

== Personal life ==
Andaya was born with a cleft palate. He decided against having surgery to remove it when he was young.

== Filmography ==
=== Television ===
| Year | Title | Role | Ref. |
|---|---|---|---|
| 2017–2018 | Super Ma'am | Pido | |
| 2018 | FPJ's Ang Probinsyano | Bruno | |
| 2018 | Bagani | Lake | |
| 2019 | The General's Daughter | Jack | |
| 2019 | It's Showtime! | Himself | |
| 2022 | Agimat ng Agila Season 2 | Kentaro | |
| 2022 | Mars Ravelo's Darna | hostage taker | |
| 2023–2026 | FPJ's Batang Quiapo | Alvin "Tanos" Garcia | |
| 2026 | A Secret in Prague | | |

=== Film ===
| Year | Title | Role | Ref. |
|---|---|---|---|
| 2013 | On the Job | Simeon | |
| 2018 | Fantastica | Kapre | |
| 2021 | Princess DayaReese | Borta | |
| 2023 | Hello Universe! | Jer | |

== PBA career statistics ==
Legend
| GP | Games played | MPG | Minutes per game |
| FG% | Field-goal percentage | 3P% | 3-point field-goal percentage | FT% | Free-throw percentage |
| RPG | Rebounds per game | APG | Assists per game | SPG | Steals per game |
| BPG | Blocks per game | PPG | Points per game | **Bold** | Career high |

=== Season-by-season averages ===
| Year | Team | GP | MPG | FG% | 3P% | FT% | RPG | APG | SPG | BPG | PPG |
|---|---|---|---|---|---|---|---|---|---|---|---|
| 2006–07 | Talk 'N Text / Air21 | **31** | 6.1 | .542 | .000 | .625 | 1.0 | .2 | **.1** | .1 | 2.0 |
| 2007–08 | Red Bull | 13 | 6.1 | .400 | .000 | .333 | 2.1 | **.5** | .0 | .4 | 2.7 |
| 2008–09 | Rain or Shine | 21 | 5.6 | .531 | .000 | .429 | 1.8 | .2 | **.1** | .4 | 1.9 |
| 2010–11 | Barako Bull | 13 | **13.2** | .471 | .000 | **.632** | **3.6** | .2 | **.1** | **1.6** | **3.4** |
| 2011–12 | Barako Bull | 2 | 3.0 | .500 | .000 | .000 | .5 | .0 | .0 | .0 | 1.0 |
| 2012–13 | Air21 | 2 | 4.0 | **.667** | .000 | .000 | .5 | .0 | .0 | .0 | 2.0 |
| Career | | 82 | 7.0 | .491 | .000 | .534 | 1.8 | .2 | .1 | .5 | 2.3 |
