= Axel Doruelo =

Filipino basketball player

Personal information
- Born: September 7, 1982 (age 44)
- Listed height: 6 ft 0 in (1.83 m)

Career information
- College: SSC-R Cavite; UP
- PBA draft: 2009: Undrafted
- Playing career: 2009–2014
- Position: Point guard

Career history
- 2009: Thai Tigers
- 2011–2012: Petron Blaze Boosters
- 2012–2013: San Miguel Beermen (ABL)
- 2013–2014: San Miguel Beermen

Axel John Doruelo is a Filipino former professional basketball player. He played college basketball for the SSC-Cavite Baycats and the UP Fighting Maroons. He last played for the San Miguel Beermen in the PBA.

== College career ==
Doruelo first played for the SSC-Cavite Baycats in the NCRAA. He scored 35 points in a win over Rizal Technological University.

For UAAP Season 68, Doruelo transferred to the UP Fighting Maroons. In a win against the NU Bulldogs, he had 20 points and 12 rebounds. UP head coach Lito Vergara called him a "blessing". He then had a career-high 26 points (with 16 of them in the second half) and 13 rebounds in a win against the Adamson Soaring Falcons. UP did not make it into the Final Four that season, finishing in fifth place.

== Semi-professional career ==
In 2006, Doruelo played in the Philippine Basketball League (PBL) for Hapee-PCU. He also played for the Rain or Shine Elastopainters, the Teletech Titans, and the Noosa Shoes Stars.

Doruelo also played in the regional league Liga Pilipinas. He scored 21 points in a win over the Cebu Niños.

== Professional career ==
Doruelo was among 33 undrafted players in the 2009 PBA Draft.

=== ABL career ===
Doruelo then played for the Thai Tigers in the ASEAN Basketball League (ABL).

He also played for the San Miguel Beermen for the 2013 ABL season.

=== PBA career ===
In 2011, he then played for the Petron Blaze Boosters in the Philippine Basketball Association (PBA).

He then returned to the Beermen after his ABL stint. He was mostly on the reserves list.

== Career stats ==
					3-Points			Field goals			Freethrows			Rebounds						
Season	Team	GP	Min	EFF	M	A	PCT	M	A	PCT	M	A	PCT	Tot	Off	Ass	Stl	Blk	Pts	Hi
2011-2012	Petron Blaze Boosters	15	72	6.8952	1	4	0.250	4	17	0.235	0	0	0.000	21	12	5	0	1	9	5
2014-2015	San Miguel Beermen	1	1	0.0000	0	0	0.000	0	0	0.000	0	0	0.000	0	0	0	0	0	0	0
