= JR Cawaling =

Filipino basketball player (born 1987)

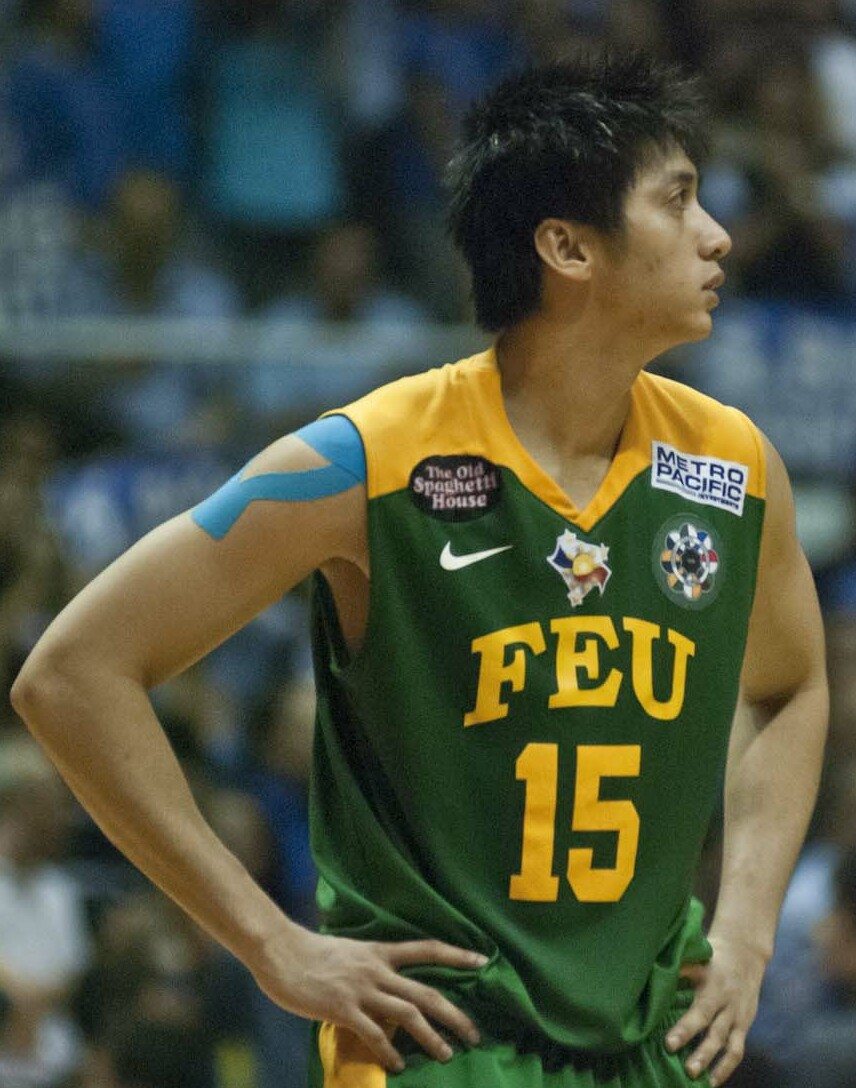
- Cawaling with the FEU Tamaraws in 2010

Personal information
- Born: August 15, 1987 (age 39) Cagayan de Oro, Philippines
- Listed height: 6 ft 4 in (1.93 m)
- Listed weight: 190 lb (86 kg)

Career information
- College: FEU
- PBA draft: 2013: 3rd round, 30th overall pick
- Drafted by: San Mig Coffee Mixers
- Playing career: 2013–2023
- Position: Small forward

Career history

Playing
- 2013: San Miguel Beermen (ABL)
- 2013–2014: San Mig Coffee Mixers / San Mig Super Coffee Mixers
- 2014: Blackwater Elite
- 2015: Kia Carnival / Mahindra Enforcer
- 2016–2017: Alab Pilipinas
- 2018: Caloocan Supremos
- 2019: Nueva Ecija MiGuard
- 2019–2020: Imus Khaleb Shawarma / Imus Bandera Luxxe Slim
- 2021: MisOr Brew Authoritea / MisOr Kuyamis
- 2022: Manila Stars
- 2023: Zamboanga Valientes

Coaching
- 2023–2024: MisOr Mustangs
- 2024: Mindoro Tamaraws
- 2024: Titans Pilipinas

Career highlights
- PBA Grand Slam champion (2014); 3× PBA champion (2013–14 Philippine, 2014 Commissioner's, 2014 Governors'); ABL champion (2013); UAAP Rookie of the Year (2007)

Ricardo "JR" Cawaling Jr. (born August 15, 1987) is a Filipino basketball coach and former professional player. He was drafted 30th overall by the San Mig Coffee Mixers in the 2013 PBA draft.

He is known as a three-point shooter. He was aliased "Aye Aye Captain" during his ABL years and "The Sweet Shooter" in his PBA career.

== College career ==
Cawaling played for the FEU Tamaraws beginning in Season 70, when he was Rookie of the Year, beating Mike Gamboa and Kirk Long for the award. In his sophomore season, they were beaten by the De La Salle Green Archers during the Final Four and FEU missed out on a Finals trip.

Cawaling returned for Season 72 off a stint with Gilas Pilipinas. He had 14 points on six of seven shooting from the field off the bench in a win over the NU Bulldogs. He scored 14 again in a 12-point win over the UP Fighting Maroons. They lost in the Final Four to the UE Red Warriors, despite him scoring 19 points.

During Season 73, Cawaling was almost suspended after he picked up both unsportsmanlike and technical fouls against the Green Archers, but UAAP Commissioner Ato Badolato ruled that these did not merit suspension, based on UAAP guidelines. That season, they finished with the best record in the league, beat La Salle in the Final Four before losing to the Blue Eagles in two games in the Finals.

Season 74 was Cawaling's final season with the Tamaraws. He injured his knee and was unavailable for most of FEU's campaign. Still, FEU reached the Finals once again.

== Professional career ==
=== San Miguel Beermen (2013) ===
Cawaling applied for the 2012 PBA Draft but three days before the draft, he pulled out and joined the San Miguel Beermen for the 2013 ABL season. His best game that season was when he scored 16 points with three three-pointers that ended the Indonesia Warriors' seven-game win streak and extended the Beermens' win streak to three. The Beermen then went on to win the championship that season. He averaged 4.4 points and 39% from three with the Beermen.

=== San Mig Franchise (2013–14) ===
Cawaling was drafted 30th overall by the San Mig Coffee Mixers in the 2013 PBA draft. He was the last member of Gilas 1.0 to make it to the PBA. In a loss to the Petron Blaze Boosters, he scored 10 of his 15 points in the 4th quarter as he tried to keep the fight going for San Mig. He was among the local players of San Mig that went on to win a PBA Grand Slam during the 2013–14 season. After that season, he was placed on the unprotected list and was available for the expansion draft.

=== Blackwater Elite (2014) ===
Cawaling was picked fifth overall in the 2014 PBA Expansion Draft by the Blackwater Elite. He didn't last a full season with the Elite, as his contract was bought out.

=== Kia Carnival / Mahindra Enforcer (2015) ===
Cawaling then joined the Kia Carnival as a free agent before the 2015 Commissioner's Cup. Then, he had 14 points in an upset win over the Alaska Aces.

=== Alab Pilipinas (2016–17) ===
Cawaling then had stints in amateur leagues. He then joined other ex-PBA players such as Jeric Fortuna and Robby Celiz among others in playing for Alab Pilipinas. A day after his older brother died, he led Alab's bench with 11 points and four rebounds as they beat the defending ABL champions Westports Malaysia Dragons. Alab dedicated the win to his brother. In a rematch with the Dragons, he had 14 points as Alab got the win once again.

=== Caloocan Supremos (2018) ===
Cawaling then reunited with his former FEU teammate Paul Sanga as they both played for the Caloocan Supremos during the 2nd season of the Maharlika Pilipinas Basketball League (MPBL). He led his team with 13 points in a loss to the Navotas Clutch. Halfway through the season, he was released into free agency.

=== Nueva Ecija MiGuard (2019) ===
In Cawaling's first game with the Nueva Ecija MiGuard, he had 11 points, four rebounds, two assists, and the game-winning putback score. He then had 18 points in a loss to the Manila Stars. In a loss to the Valenzuela Classic, he had 20 points despite shooting only three out of 15 shots. He scored 22 in a rematch against Navotas but lost the game.

=== Imus Khaleb Shawarma / Bandera Luxxe Slim (2019–20) ===
Cawaling ended 2019 on the roster of Imus Khaleb Shawarma. He then scored 11 against the Muntinlupa Angelis Resort and 13 in a loss to the Marikina Shoemasters.

=== MisOr Brew Authoritea / MisOr Kuyamis ===
In 2021, Cawaling joined the MisOr Brew Authoritea in the Pilipinas VisMin Super Cup. He then strained his hamstring, and joined nine other players on the injured list. As a result, MisOr pulled out from the tournament.

=== Manila Stars (2022) ===
Cawaling played in only one game for the Stars in the MPBL.

=== Zamboanga Valientes (2023) ===
Cawaling then joined the Valientes for the 2023 ABL season.

== Professional career statistics ==
Legend
GP	Games played	MPG	Minutes per game
FG%	Field-goal percentage	3P%	3-point field-goal percentage	FT%	Free-throw percentage
RPG	Rebounds per game	APG	Assists per game	SPG	Steals per game
BPG	Blocks per game	PPG	Points per game	**Bold**	Career high

=== PBA ===
Year	Team	GP	MPG	FG%	3P%	FT%	RPG	APG	SPG	BPG	PPG
2013–14	San Mig	18	8.1	**.372**	.320	.400	.9	.3	–	**.1**	2.3
2014–15	Blackwater	18	**13.0**	.351	**.353**	.400	**1.3**	**.8**	**.1**	–	**4.3**
2014–15	Kia	18	**13.0**	.351	**.353**	.400	**1.3**	**.8**	**.1**	–	**4.3**
Career		36	10.5	.358	.342	.400	1.1	.6	.1	.0	3.9

== 3x3 career ==
In 2019, Cawaling teamed up with former Coffee Mixers teammate Jerwin Gaco when they played for the Vigan MiGuard Wolves in the second leg of the Chooks-to-Go Pilipinas 3x3 Patriot's Cup.

In 2021, Cawaling joined the Zamboanga Valientes in the PBA 3x3. The Valientes didn't make it to Leg 6 of the inaugural tournament, as he was the only one on the team available as the rest suffered multiple injuries. They then pulled out of the second conference.

== National team career ==
In 2008, Cawaling tried out for the Philippine national team along with other college cagers. His first international competition was the 2008 Pingguo Invitational Tournament, which his team won. From there, he became a member of the national team program, dubbed "Smart Gilas Pilipinas". He represented the country in the 2009 FIBA Asia Champions Cup. He also got to play in the 2009–10 PBA Philippine Cup as Gilas was a guest team that conference. On October 12, 2010, it was announced that he had quit the program to focus on his commitments to FEU.
