= Efren Peñaflorida =

Filipino teacher and development worker

- Born: Efren Geronimo Peñaflorida Jr. March 5, 1981 (age 45)
- Known for: 2009 CNN Hero of the Year

Efren Geronimo Peñaflorida, OL (born March 5, 1981), is a Filipino teacher and development worker. He offers Filipino youth an alternative to street gangs through education, recreating school settings in unconventional locations such as cemeteries and trash dumps.

In March 2009, Peñaflorida was featured as a CNN Hero as part of the news network's program to honor individuals who make extraordinary contributions to help others. On November 22, 2009, he was named CNN Hero of the Year.

== Early life ==
Efren Peñaflorida was born the middle child of Efren Peñaflorida Sr., a tricycle driver, and Lucila Geronimo, a housewife. The family eventually started a small nut business to make ends meet. Efren grew up in an urban slum near an open dump site in Cavite City, Cavite, playing amongst garbage and swimming in polluted waters. He would often fall victim to neighborhood bullying. Peñaflorida was one of World Vision's sponsored-children during his early childhood.

Peñaflorida completed his elementary and high school education through the help of scholarships and financial assistance, and received several class awards and honors. In 2000, he graduated from San Sebastian College–Recoletos de Cavite with a degree in computer technology, receiving highest honors. He pursued a second course at Cavite City campus of the Cavite State University, graduating cum laude in 2006 with a degree in Secondary Education.

== Dynamic Teen Company ==
In 1997, at 16 years old, Peñaflorida started a youth group in his high school aimed at diverting students' attention away from street gangs, and towards community activism and personal development. Joined by other classmates, they named the group Dynamic Teen Company.

Dynamic Teen Company started as a friendship club of around 20 members, with an aim of providing youth awareness projects, talent and self-development activities, and community services. They collaborated with Club 8586, another community service organization operating in the area.

They eventually pioneered the idea of the "pushcart classroom", where pushcarts were stocked with school materials such as books, pens, tables, and chairs, and then used on Saturdays to recreate school settings in unconventional locations such as the cemetery or trash dump.

=== CNN Hero ===
Peñaflorida was nominated for CNN Heroes by Club 8586, the youth group that financed his elementary and high school education. After sifting through 9,000 nominees from over 100 countries, CNN's Blue Ribbon Panel selected Peñaflorida as one of its 28 heroes of 2009. On October 1, Peñaflorida was named among the ten finalists. On November 22, he was named CNN Hero of the Year for 2009. The award includes $100,000 cash to continue his work with Dynamic Teen Company.

Philippine President Gloria Macapagal Arroyo conferred on Efren Peñaflorida the Order of Lakandula in a ceremony at Malacañang Palace upon his return to the Philippines.
