= 2012 ABL season =

- League: ASEAN Basketball League
- Sport: Basketball
- Duration: 13 January 2012 – 13 May 2012
- Teams: 8

ABL season
- Season MVP: Leo Avenido (San Miguel)

2011 ABL finals
- Champions: Indonesia Warriors
- Runners-up: San Miguel Beermen

ABL seasons
- ← 2010–11 2013 →

The 2012 ASEAN Basketball League season was the third season of competition of the ASEAN Basketball League (ABL) since its establishment. A total of eight teams will compete the league. The regular season will begin on 16 January 2012 and will end on 13 May 2012. Three teams will debut this season: the Bangkok Cobras, the San Miguel Beermen and the SSA Saigon Heat, while the Brunei Barracudas team took a leave of absence. Satria Muda BritAma was renamed into the Indonesia Warriors, while the Westports KL Dragons were renamed as the Westports Malaysia Dragons, and Singapore Slingers were renamed Jobstreet.com Singapore Slingers.

The season was delayed until January 2012 to give way to the Southeast Asian Games.

== Preseason ==
The ABL underwent expansion with three new teams debuting. The San Miguel Beermen signed a five-year contract with the league; this is a different team from the Philippine Basketball Association (PBA) team owned by San Miguel Corporation that now carries the Petron Blaze Boosters name. Bobby Parks was named as the head coach.

Bangkok Basketball Holdings were the second team to join the league. The team will be the second Thai team, after the defending champions Chang Thailand Slammers. The third team to join the league was SSA Saigon Heat organised by the Saigon Sports Academy. The Heat are the first international basketball team to represent Vietnam.

The Brunei Barracudas, a team that has failed to make it to the playoffs in the league's first two seasons, has decided not participate in the 2012 season. While no reason was given, the team has heavily relied on its starting five, who are all imports, to play the game in its entirety.

Six of the eight teams participated in the To Be Number One Basketball Challenge held in Bangkok in benefit of the victims of the 2011 Thailand floods. The San Miguel Beermen defeated the AirAsia Philippine Patriots to win the championship. In 2012, the Beermen, the Patriots and the Qatari team Al -Jaysh will participate in another preseason tournament at the Ynares Sports Arena in Pasig.

== Arenas ==
Locations of the northern ABL teams.
Locations of the southern ABL teams.
Arenas used within Metro Manila.

Team	Location	Arena	Head coach
Philippine Patriots	San Juan; Pasig	San Juan Gym; Ynares Sports Arena	(Philippines) Glenn Capacio
Bangkok Cobras	Bangkok	Chulalongkorn University Gym*	(United States) Joe Bryant
Thailand Slammers	Bangkok	Thai-Japanese Gym*	(United States) Felton Sealey
Indonesia Warriors	North Jakarta; Bandung	The BritAma Arena; GOR C-Tra Arena	(United States) John Todd Purves
Saigon Heat	Ho Chi Minh City	Tan Binh Gymnasium	(United States) Jason Rabedeaux
San Miguel Beermen	Pasig; Parañaque	Ynares Sports Arena; Olivarez College Gym	(United States) Bobby Parks
Singapore Slingers	Singapore	Singapore Indoor Stadium	(Singapore) Neo Beng Siang
Westports Malaysia Dragons	Kuala Lumpur	MABA Stadium	(Philippines) Ariel Vanguardia

*these are indoor arenas located adjacent to the outdoor stadiums.

== Standings ==
#	Team	GP	W	L	PF	PA	PD	Pts
1	(Philippines) San Miguel Beermen	21	17	4	1678	1475	+203	34
2	(Philippines) Philippine Patriots	21	16	5	1697	1580	+117	32
3	Indonesia Warriors	21	12	9	1623	1507	+116	24
4	Westports Malaysia Dragons	21	11	10	1775	1726	+49	22
5	Singapore Slingers	21	9	12	1536	1536	0	18
6	(Vietnam) Saigon Heat	21	8	13	1424	1571	−147	16
7	(Thailand) Bangkok Cobras	21	6	15	1446	1650	−204	12
8	Thailand Slammers	21	5	16	1493	1627	−134	10

Qualified to the semifinals

== Results ==
- Score of the home team is listed first.
- In case where a game went into overtime, the number of asterisks denotes the number of overtime periods played.

=== First and second round ===
Home \ Away	APP	BC	CTS	IW	SH	SMB	SIN	WMD
Philippine		86–58	89–68	86–73	76–62	66–68	90–84	86–72
Bangkok	60–55		71–67	57–73	78–86		79–74	85–81
Thailand	72–81	86–76		72–89	78–58	59–68	66–56	80–69
Indonesia	68–72	74–67	70–82		96–68	61–77	65–57	80–93
Saigon	62–76	61–76	60–53	68–72		62–85	55–60	70–69
San Miguel	78–70	94–59	92–77	81–77*	63–66		75–65	70–73
Singapore	75–80	73–48	74–63	59–79	67–72	71–63		81–70
Malaysia	87–90	70–73	106–72	82–79	97–86	83–77*	86–71	

Legend: Blue = home team win; Red = away team win.
Matches with lighter background shading were decided after overtime.

=== Third round ===
Home \ Away	APP	BC	CTS	IW	SH	SMB	SIN	WMD
Philippine				79–104	76–70			93–97*
Bangkok	78–84		83–78	79–99	66–68			84–107
Thailand	74–80				56–58	76–103	70–77	
Indonesia			73–63			69–71		98–80
Saigon	57–73	77–69		88–86				
San Miguel	93–78	91–77					68–64	
Singapore	70–82	95–78		85–92	73–67			
Malaysia			94–79		95–75	76–92	88–105	

Legend: Blue = home team win; Red = away team win.
Matches with lighter background shading were decided after overtime.

== Statistical leaders ==
Category	Player	Team	Stat
Points	(United States) Tiras Wade	Westports Malaysia Dragons	26.05
Rebounds	(United States) Steven Thomas	Indonesia Warriors	14.79
Assists	(Philippines) Al Vergara	(Philippines) Philippine Patriots	4.90
Steals	(United States) Louis Graham	(Philippines) San Miguel Beermen	2.00
Blocks	(United States) Nakiea Miller	(Philippines) Philippine Patriots	2.84

== Playoffs ==
Best-of-3 semifinals
1	San Miguel Beermen	2
4	Westports Malaysia Dragons	1
2	Philippine Patriots	0
3	Indonesia Warriors	2

Best-of-3 finals
1	San Miguel Beermen	1
3	Indonesia Warriors	2

=== Semifinals ===
The semi-finals is a best-of-three series, with the higher seeded team hosting game 1, and 3 if necessary.

Team 1	Series	Team 2	Game 1	Game 2	Game 3
San Miguel Beermen (Philippines)	2–1	Westports Malaysia Dragons	114–104 (OT)	77–100	90–56
Philippine Patriots (Philippines)	0–2	Indonesia Warriors	63–74	51–72	—

=== Finals ===
The finals is a best-of-three series, with the higher seeded team hosting game 1, and 3 if necessary.

Semi-final 1 winner	Series	Semi-final 2 winner	Game 1	Game 2	Game 3
San Miguel Beermen (Philippines)	1–2	Indonesia Warriors	86–83	61–81	76–78

The two teams already qualified for the 2012 FIBA Asia Champions Cup in Lebanon. However the two teams ultimately did not took part.
