= Christian Luanzon =

Filipino basketball player

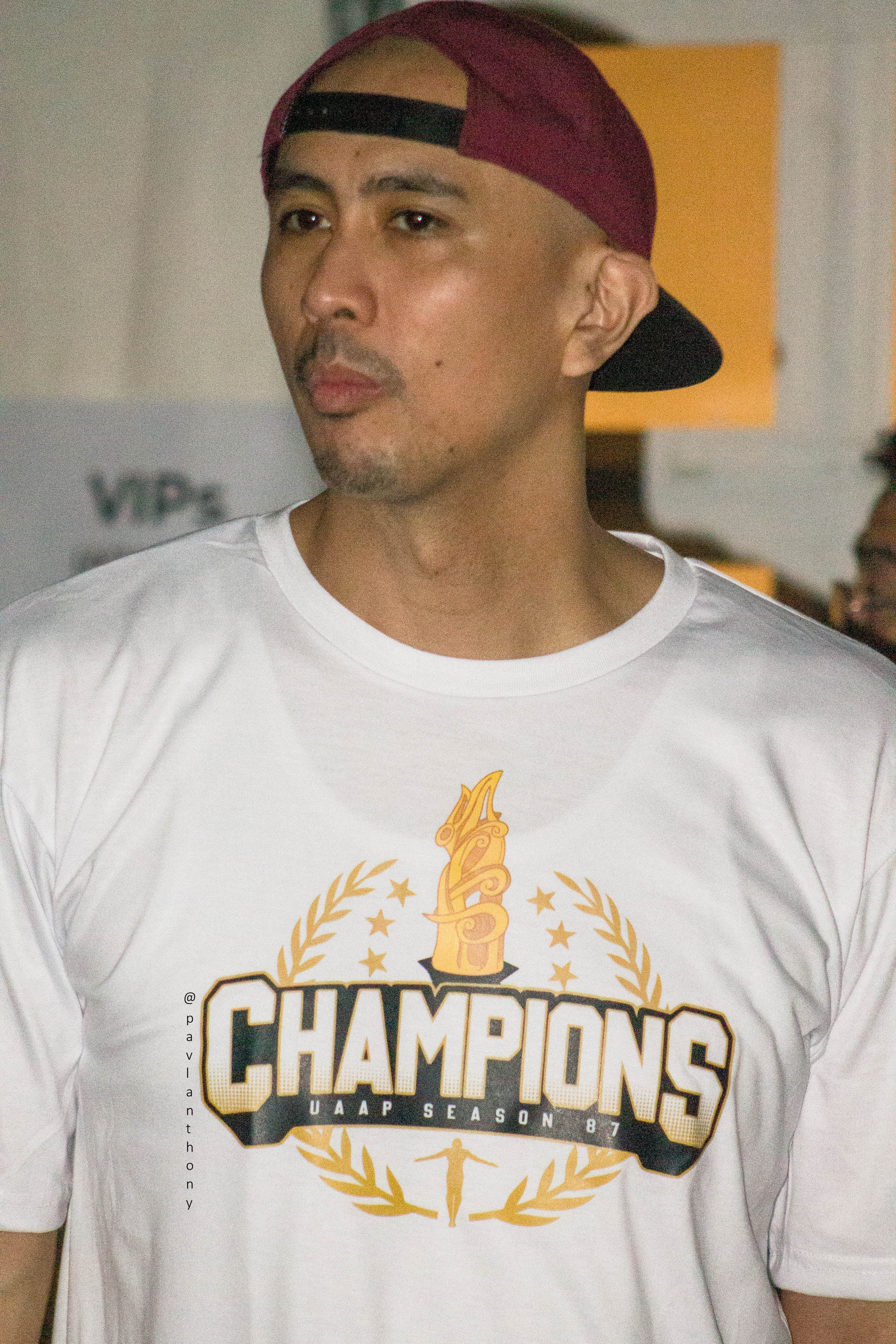
- Luanzon during the UAAP Season 87 in 2024

UP Fighting Maroons
- Title: Assistant coach
- League: University Athletic Association of the Philippines (UAAP)

Personal information
- Born: January 22, 1983 (age 43) San Jose, California, U.S.
- Listed height: 6 ft 4 in (1.93 m)
- Listed weight: 190 lb (86 kg)

Career information
- High school: Saint Stephen's (Manila)
- College: UST
- PBA draft: 2006: 2nd round, 18th overall pick
- Drafted by: Alaska Aces
- Playing career: 2006–2013
- Position: Power forward
- Number: 20
- Coaching career: 2022–present

Career history

Playing
- 2006–2008: Alaska Aces
- 2012–2013: San Miguel Beermen (ABL)

Coaching
- 2022–present: UP (assistant)

Career highlights
- As player: PBA champion (2007 Fiesta); ABL champion (2013); PBL Rookie of the Year (2002); 2× PBL Mythical Second Team (2005, 2006); PBL scoring champion (2006); PBL champion (2006); As assistant coach: 2× UAAP champion (2022, 2024)

Christian Pierce Gaddi Luanzon (born January 22, 1983) is a retired Filipino-American professional basketball player in the Philippine Basketball Association who last played for the San Miguel Beermen.

He is part of the broadcast panel of the UAAP men's basketball for ABS-CBN Sports. He also played for the Malacañan-PSC Kamao in the UNTV Cup.

== Collegiate career ==
Although born in the United States, Luanzon grew up in the Philippines played in St. Stephen's High School in Manila and played collegiate ball at the University of Santo Tomas (UST). He was named into the First-Team All-UAAP First Team honors in the 2003–2004 season. In his last year in the UAAP he averaged a team high 15 points, 9.2 rebounds and 6.7 Assists.

== PBA career ==
Prior to the 2006 draft, Luanzon volunteered to have a workout with the Aces. During his days with the Growling Tigers, Luanzon had shown abilities to hit the jumpers, defend the wing players and finish the fast breaks.

Tabbed No. 18 overall in the 2006 PBA Draft, Luanzon's ability to defend the quicker players and hit the perimeter opens an opportunity for him to reach the big league. He played for Harbour Center in the PBL where he suited up for four games.

He was a member of the Alaska Aces when they won the 2007 PBA Fiesta Conference championship.

He last played in the PBL-Liga Merger for the ANI-FCA Cultivators Team.

== Coaching career ==
Beginning in 2022, Luanzon became one of the assistant coaches for the UP Fighting Maroons. In Season 84, the Maroons won the championship.
