= Cavite State University – CCAT Campus =

Public university in Cavite, Philippines

Cavite State University - CCAT Campus
- Former names: Cavite College of Arts and Trades (1970); Cavite State University - Rosario Campus
- Motto: Truth, Integrity, Excellence, Service
- Type: State University
- Established: August 8, 1970
- Academic affiliations: Philippine Association of State Universities and Colleges; State Colleges and Universities Athletic Association
- President: Dr. Ma. Agnes P. Nuestro
- Campus Administrator: Dr. Lauro B. Pascua
- Students: 5,990 (2026)
- Location: EM's Barrio, Tejeros Convention, Rosario, Cavite, Philippines; 14°24′14″N 120°52′02″E
- Campus: 9.23 hectares (22.8 acres)
- Newspaper: Nexus
- Colors: Blue
- Nickname: Pistons
- Website: cvsu-rosario.edu.ph
- Location in Luzon Location in the Philippines

Cavite State University - CCAT Campus is one of the 11 satellite campuses of Cavite State University (CvSU), with its main campus located in Indang, Cavite. It is also known as CvSU-R and Cavite State University College of Arts and Trade. It is located at Brgy. Tejeros Convention, Rosario, Cavite. It is formerly known as Cavite College of Arts and Trades (CCAT).

== History ==
=== As CCAT ===
The Cavite College of Arts and Trades (CCAT) was established by Republic Act No. 5966 authored by Cong. Justiniano S. Montano was approved on June 21, 1969, as a National College of Arts and Trades primarily to provide higher technological, professional, occupational, and vocational education. The college was inaugurated on August 8, 1970, and regular classes for the Two-Year Trade Technical Curriculum started on August 12, 1970, with 27 students.

It served as Training Center for National Manpower Training Program in February, 1971 to July, 1972. A special One-Year Course was also offered in the same year. As per Department Order No. 20 s. 1973, the Secondary Trade Curriculum was also offered in the same year the Two-Year Trade Technician Education was implemented.

After five years of existence, the school was classified as Teacher Education Institution in Industrial Education. Arturo P. Casuga served CCAT as Superintendent.

In 1976, the ROTC unit was established in CCAT to enroll the college students for military training and tactics, a requisite for graduation as well as requirement for all Filipinos to undergo military training.

In 1982, CCAT became a beneficiary of the Technical and Vocational Education Project (TVEP) which was aided by the Asian Development Bank (ADB). Seven years later, the college was selected as a recipient of the Philippine-Australian Technical and Vocational Education Project (PATVEP). In 1983, CCAT was selected as TVEP Research and Information Center for Region IV.

=== As CvSU-R ===
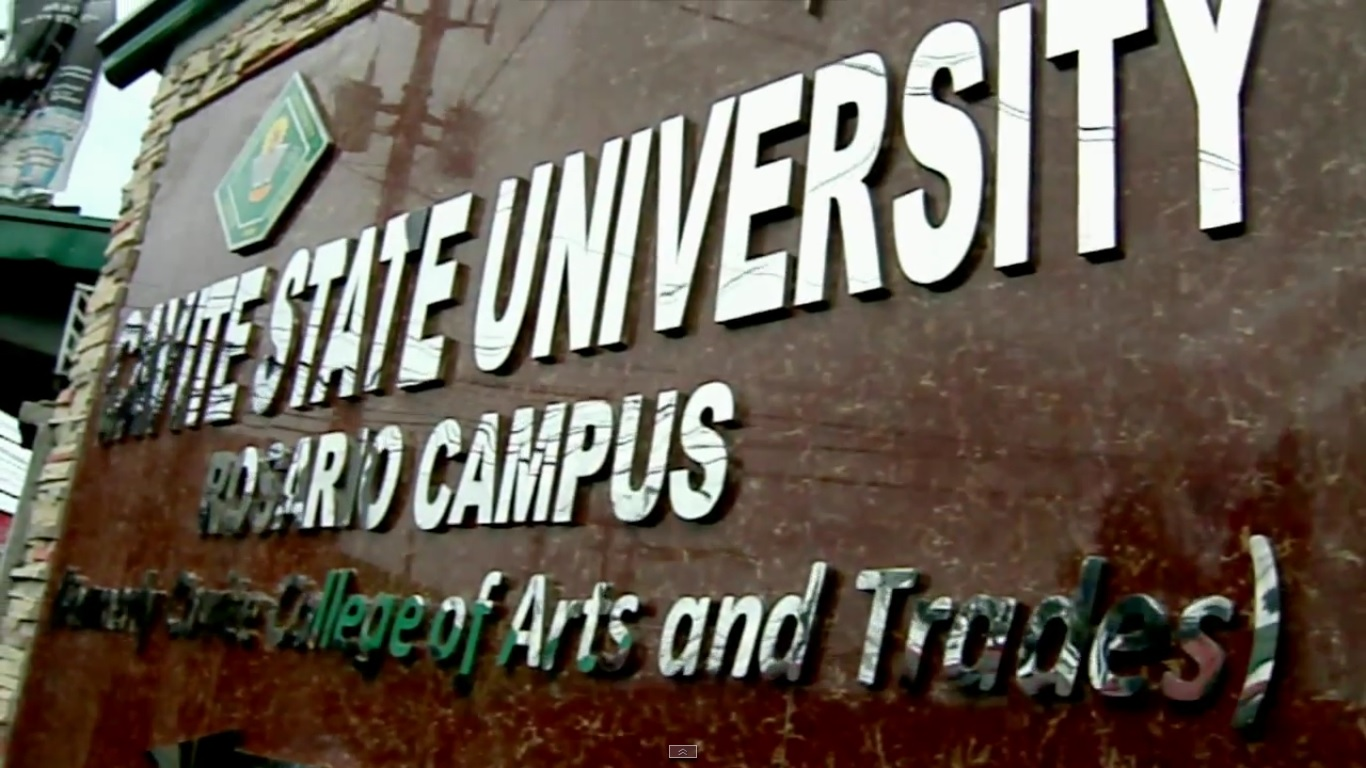
Cavite State University Rosario Campus

In 2001, CCAT was integrated with the Cavite State University (CvSU) by virtue of CHED Memo No. 27, s. 2000. Dr. Maria C. Yaba was designated Assistant to the CvSU President for CvSU Rosario Campus operation. Additional courses were offered: BS in Business Management (BSBM) and Associate in Computer Technology (ACT).

CvSU Rosario started offering additional degree courses: BS in Electrical Engineering (BSEE) and BS in Mechanical Engineering (BSME) were offered in 2002; Bachelor of Science in Computer Engineering, Bachelor of Science in Computer Science and Bachelor of Science in Information Technology in 2008.
