= China-ASEAN CBO Basketball Invitational Tournament =

International basketball tournament in China

The China-ASEAN CBO Basketball Invitational Tournament is an international basketball tournament held in Guangxi, China, between teams from ASEAN and China. The first tournament was held in Pingguo County in the city of Bose from December 17–21, 2008. The Philippines won the inaugural tournament beating Guangxi in the finals. Home United of Singapore won bronze by beating Macau.

At the 2009 and 2010 edition of the tournament, the Misamis Oriental Meteors, which represented the Philippines emerged as champions by beating Guangxi in the finals for 2-consecutive times.

At the 2011 edition, Malaysia represented by the national team that they will send to the 2011 Southeast Asian Games emerged champions of the tournament by beating the Guangxi provincial team by 74–72. Singapore defeated Chinese Taipei for the bronze medal.

== Results ==
Year	Host	Final			Third-place game		
Year	Host	Champion	Score	Second Place	Third Place	Score	Fourth Place
2008; Details	(China); Guangxi	Philippines	76–72	(China); Guangxi	(Singapore); Home United	82–74	Macau
2009; Details	(China); Guangxi	(Philippines); Misamis Oriental Meteors	83–75	(China); Guangxi	Hong Kong		Singapore
2010; Details	(China); Guangxi	(Philippines); Misamis Oriental Meteors	96–67	(China); Guangxi	Thailand	78–53	Hong Kong
2011; Details	(China); Guangxi	Malaysia	74–72	(China); Guangxi	Singapore	124–90	Chinese Taipei

== Medal table ==
Rank	Nation	Gold	Silver	Bronze	Total
1	Philippines	3	0	0	3
2	Malaysia	1	0	0	1
3	China	0	4	0	4
4	Singapore	0	0	2	2
5	Hong Kong	0	0	1	1
5	Thailand	0	0	1	1
Totals (6 entries)		4	4	4	12
