= Hello, Universe! =

2023 fantasy comedy film by Xian Lim

- Directed by: Xian Lim
- Written by: Xian Lim; Eseng Cruz
- Produced by: Vincent del Rosario III; Veronique del Rosario-Corpus; Valerie Del Rosario
- Starring: Janno Gibbs
- Cinematography: Jethro Jamon
- Edited by: Nelson Villamayor
- Music by: Jem Florendo
- Production company: Viva Films
- Distributed by: Viva Films
- Release date: January 25, 2023
- Running time: 105 minutes
- Country: Philippines
- Language: Filipino

Hello, Universe! is a 2023 Philippine fantasy comedy film written and directed by Xian Lim. The film stars Janno Gibbs.

== Plot ==
Ariel (Janno) believes that his life became miserable after he lost against his rival Mac (Gene) during their high school basketball game, who later on became a famous basketball coach. Ariel's regrets and insecurities resurface when Mac and his basketball team return to Ariel's hometown for the first time in decades. Getting fed up with his regrets, Ariel meets Jessie (Benjie), a genie who takes him to an alternate universe where he is a famous basketball coach. Ariel gets to rewrite his past and lives the life he wanted, albeit at a cost.

== Cast ==
- Janno Gibbs as Ariel
  - Luke Simon Cornel as Young Ariel
  - Peter Andrei Burce as Teen Ariel
- Benjie Paras as Jessie
- Anjo Yllana as Rocky
  - Ralph Aldrich Sison as Teen Rocky
- Maui Taylor as Jennifer
  - Miroslav Loren Balanon as Teen Jennifer
- Gene Padilla as Mac
- MJ Cayabyab as Leeroy
- Sunshine Guimary as Lauren
- Gino Ilustre as Boss Terry
- Joe Vargas as Bobby
- Ube Lola as Lola Osna
- Mark Andaya as Jer
- Darwin Tolentino as Jel
- Madelaine Red as Faith
- Majo Lingat as Maila
- Gab Lagman as Bulacan Star Player
- Cris Ryan Bañares as Mang Nanding
- Karl Isaac Santos as Basketball Coach

== See also ==
- List of basketball films
