= San Sebastian College – Recoletos Cavite =

Roman Catholic college in Cavite, Philippines

- Kolehiyo ng San Sebastián-Rekoletos sa Cavite (Filipino)
- We make education work
- Former names: San Sebastian Junior College-Recoletos (1966-1988)
- Motto: Caritas et Scientia (Latin)
- Motto in English: Knowledge based on Love
- Type: Private Roman Catholic Non-profit Coeducational Basic and Higher education institution
- Established: 1966; 60 years ago
- Founder: Order of Augustinian Recollects
- Religious affiliation: Roman Catholic (Augustinian Recollects)
- Academic affiliations: PAASCU
- President: Rafael B. Pecson, OAR
- Vice-president: James Bumangabang, OAR (VP for Academic Services); Joseph D. Palagtiosa, OAR (VP for Formation, Mission, and Identity); Raymund Alcedo, OAR (VP for Finance Services)
- Director: Samuel L. Eyas, OAR (Director, Basic Education); Rommel L. Rubia, OAR (Director of Human Resource Management and Development)
- Location: Manila- Cavite Road; Sta. Cruz, Cavite City, Cavite, Philippines; 14°28′54″N 120°54′26″E
- Campus: Urban; Main Campus: Manila-Cavite Road, Sta. Cruz, Cavite City Satellite Campus: Padre Burgos St., Bo. Rosario, San Roque, Cavite City
- Alma Mater song: SSC-R Cavite Hymn
- Colors: Red and Gold
- Nickname: Sebastinians
- Sporting affiliations: NAASCU, NCAA - South
- Mascot: Golden Stags
- Website: www.sscr.edu
- Location in Luzon Location in the Philippines

San Sebastian College – Recoletos Cavite, commonly referred to by its nickname Bastê-Cavite, is a private, Catholic, coeducational basic and higher education institution run by the Order of Augustinian Recollects in Cavite City, Cavite, Philippines. It was founded by the Augustinian Recollects in 1966 as an all-boys institution, but became co-educational in 1986. In addition to the college and the Graduate School, it has a pre-school, grade school, junior high school and senior high school divisions. It is the second school run by the Augustinian Recollects which is named San Sebastian College-Recoletos.

== Campuses ==
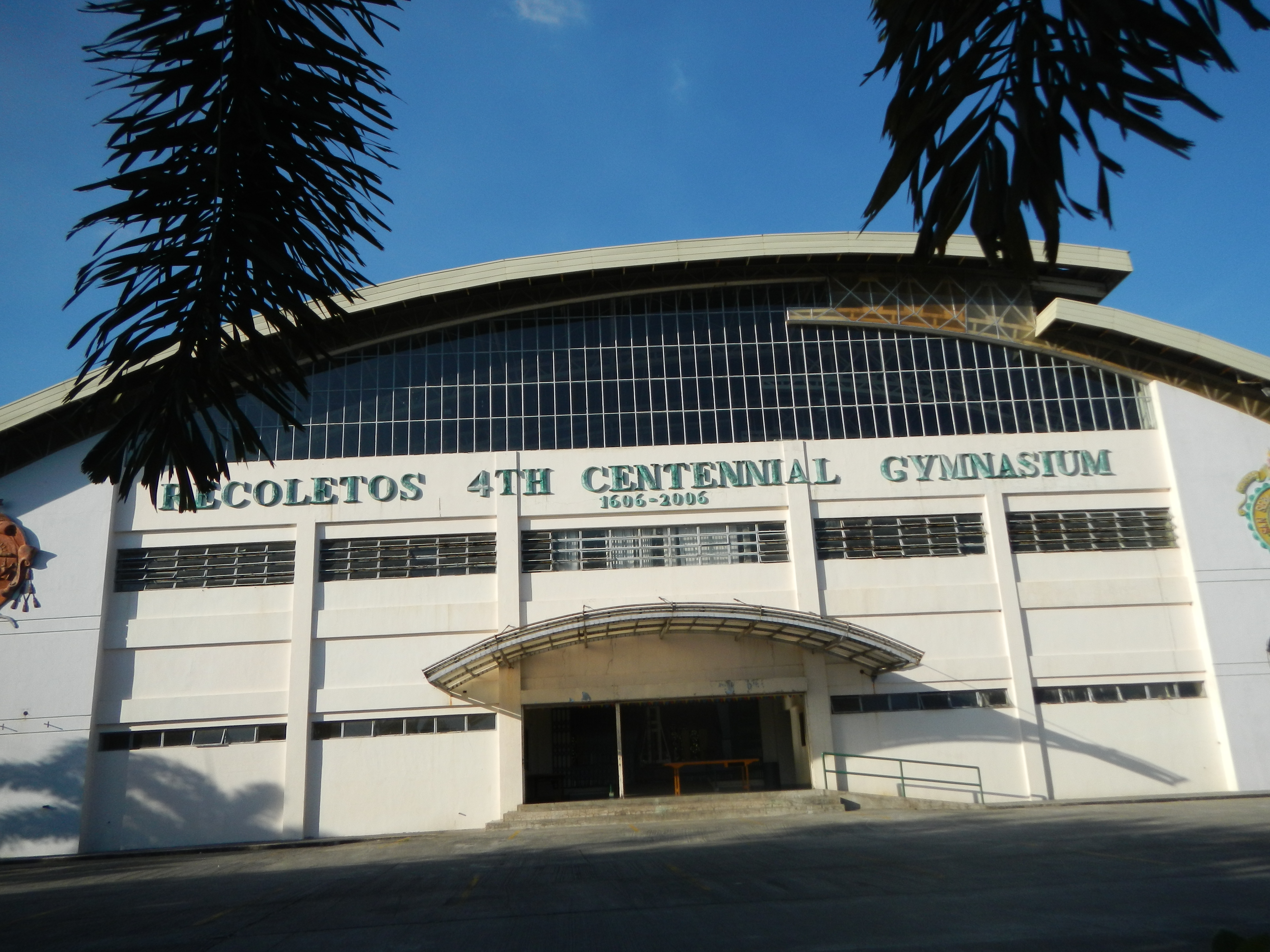
Cavite City Campus beside Samonte Park

=== Main campus ===
The main campus, which houses the graduate school, college department and senior high school is located along Manila-Cavite Road in Sta. Cruz, Cavite City.

==== Buildings ====
- St. Augustine Building - also known as the Main/Administrative building. It houses the school's administrative offices. It also houses the school's Chapel and Multi-Purpose Hall, an audio-visual room, bookstore, classrooms and laboratories such as the Psychology Laboratory, Science and Experimental Laboratories and the College Faculty Consultation Room. It also houses the Senior High School department of the institution.
- St. Ezekiel Moreno Building - a five-storey building which houses the St. Ezekiel Moreno Lobby, the main venue for school's major activities. It also houses the St. Thomas of Villanova Main Library at the second floor, Laboratories such as the Computer Laboratories at third floor, Mass Communication Laboratory and Crime Laboratory at the fourth floor and the HRM Mini-Hotel, Bar Laboratory and HRM Kitchen at the Fifth floor. The Dean's Office of the College of Criminal Justice Education is also located here at the fourth floor.
- St. Monica Building - the tallest building of the campus. It is a six-storey building with a penthouse and a rooftop. It houses the school's canteen, audio-visual rooms, and laboratories such as the speech laboratory, micro laboratory and the Computer engineering laboratory. The Instructional Media Center is also located here at the third floor.
- Our Lady of Consolation Building - this five-storey building houses the Dean's Office of the College of Engineering, Computer Studies and Technology. The Nursing Skills Laboratory and Program office is also located here. It also houses Laboratories such as the Mechanical Engineering Laboratory, the ITM Laboratory and Chemistry Laboratory. The school's elevator is also located here.
- St. Joseph the Worker Building - this building houses the Physics Laboratory and the Electronics and Communications Engineering Laboratory. The barracks is also located in the building. The second through fourth floors contain classrooms.

=== Cañacao campus ===
This campus houses the preschool, grade school, and high school departments. It is located in Barrio Rosario St., San Roque, Cavite City.

==== Buildings ====
- Basic Education Building - it houses the Pre-School, Grade School and Junior High School Departments of the institution. It is also equipped with stable facilities for the students.
- Recoletos 4th Centennial Gymnasium - a 3000-seater multi-purpose gymnasium that caters most of the school's institutional activities such as Intramurals, Foundation Anniversary and Institutional Eucharistic Celebrations.

== Programs Offered ==
The school runs a Graduate School, four Colleges, Senior High School Department and Basic Education Department. Listed below are the list of Colleges and courses offered by the institution as well as the programs under its Senior High School and Basic Education Departments.

Graduate School of Business

- Master in Business Administration

College of Arts, Sciences and Nursing (CASN)

- Bachelor of Arts in Communication (PAASCU Accredited Level 1)
- Bachelor of Science in Psychology (PAASCU Accredited Level 1)
- Bachelor of Science in Nursing

College of Accountancy, Business Administration and Hospitality Management (CABAHM)

- Bachelor of Science in Accountancy (PAASCU Accredited Level 1)
- Bachelor of Science in Business Administration Major in Management Accounting (PAASCU Accredited Level 1)
- Bachelor of Science in Business Administration Major in Financial Management (PAASCU Accredited Level 1)
- Bachelor of Science in Business Administration Major in Marketing Management (PAASCU Accredited Level 1)
- Bachelor of Science in Business Administration Major in Human Resource Development Management (PAASCU Accredited Level 1)
- Bachelor of Science in Hospitality Management Major in Hotel and Restaurant Management
- Bachelor of Science in Hospitality Management Major in Tourism

College of Engineering, Computer Studies and Technology (CECSCT)

- Bachelor of Science in Industrial Engineering
- Bachelor of Science in Electronics and Communications Engineering
- Bachelor of Science in Computer Engineering
- Bachelor of Science in Information Technology

College of Criminal Justice Education

- Bachelor of Science in Criminology

Senior High School Department

- Accountancy, Business and Management (ABM)
- Science, Technology, Engineering and Mathematics (STEM)
- Humanities and Social Sciences (HUMSS)
- Tech-Voc Track

Basic Education Department

- Pre-School (PAASCU Accredited Level 2)
- Grade School (PAASCU Accredited Level 2)
- Junior High School (PAASCU and FAPE Accredited Level 2)

== Competitions ==
The college participates in events such as:

- National Athletic Association of Schools, Colleges and Universities (NAASCU)
- NCAA (South Division)
- City Meet (Division of Cavite City)
- Division Schools Press Conference (Division of Cavite City)
- Regional Schools Press Conference
- National Schools Press Conference
- Cavite Schools Cultural and Athletic Association (CAVSCAA)

== Notable alumni ==
- Ronnie del Carmen
- Niccolo Cosme
- Efren Peñaflorida
- Antonio Ruiz Maigue
- Mark Yee - PBA player
- Axel Doruelo - PBA player

== Gallery ==
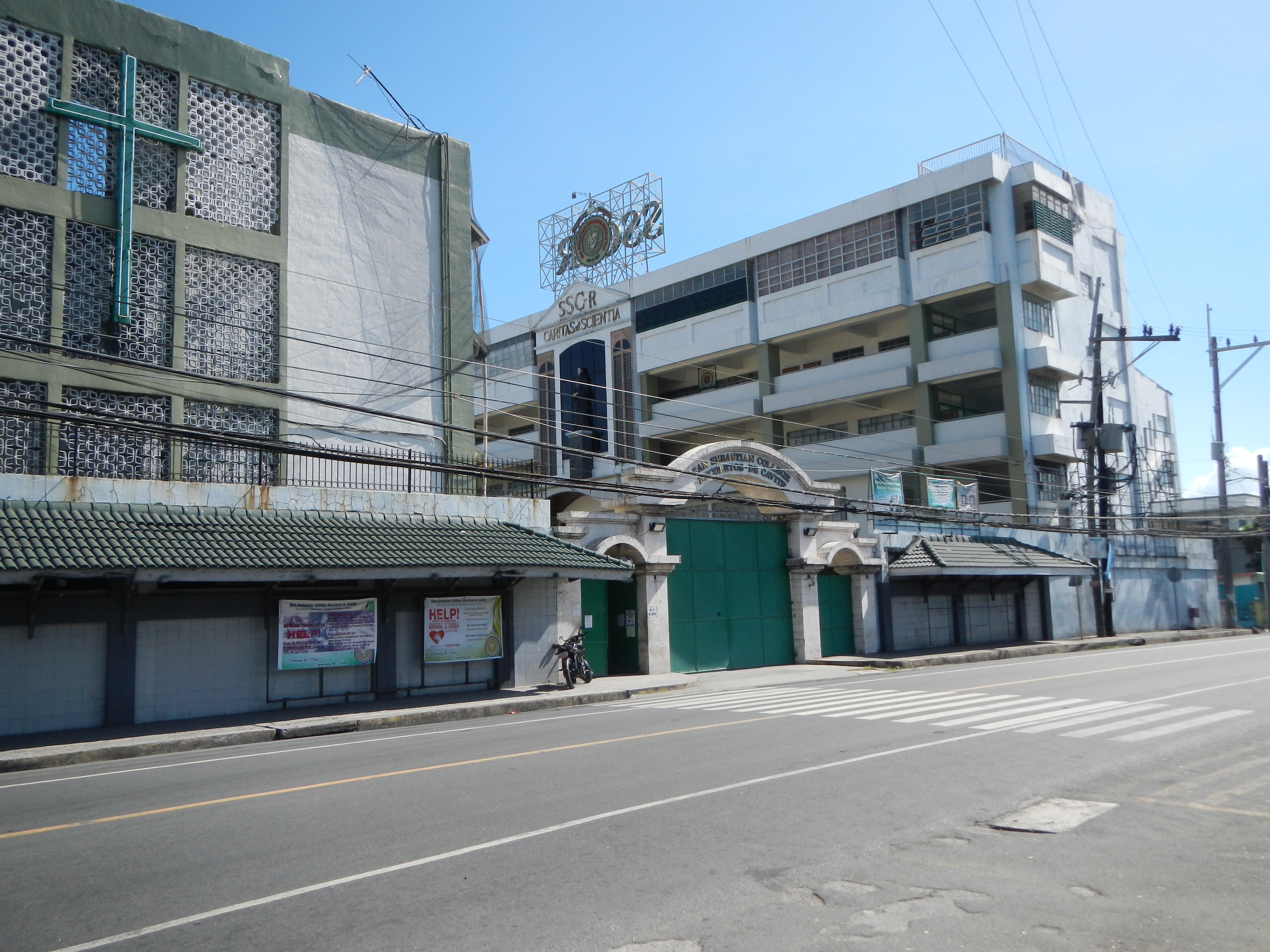
Entrance facade

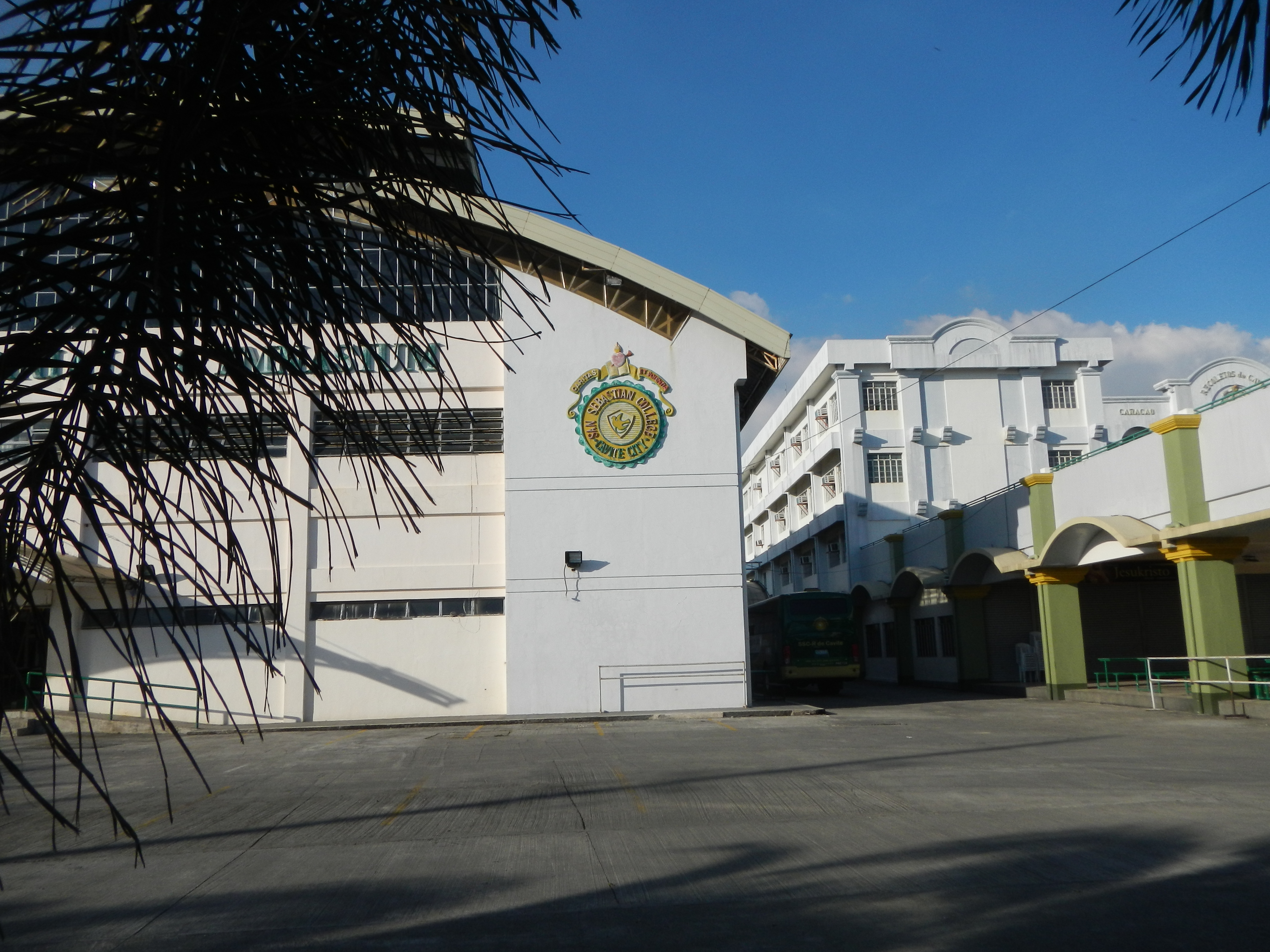
Outside the gymnasium
