= San Miguel Beermen (ABL) =

Philippine basketball team

- Leagues: ASEAN Basketball League (2011–2013)
- Founded: 2011
- Folded: 2013
- Arena: Ynares Sports Arena
- Capacity: 3,000
- Location: Pasig
- Team colors: Red, black, white and yellow
- President: Ramon S. Ang
- Head coach: Bobby Parks, Leo Austria
- Ownership: San Miguel Corporation
- Championships: 1 (2013)

The San Miguel Beermen was a professional basketball team that played in the ASEAN Basketball League (ABL) from 2012 to 2013. The team was from the Philippines and owned by San Miguel Corporation (SMC). This franchise was separate and distinct from the original Philippine Basketball Association (PBA) franchise which played as the "Petron Blaze Boosters" when this team was active. The Beermen played most of their home games at the Ynares Sports Arena in Pasig but also played some of their games in the Olivarez College Gym, Ynares Center, and PhilSports Arena.

== History ==
In July 2011, SMC announced its participation in the ASEAN Basketball League (ABL) beginning in the 2012 ABL season, as the San Miguel Beermen - a franchise distinct from its PBA franchise.

In June 2013, the Beermen won its first ABL title in the 2013 ABL playoffs, defeating the Indonesia Warriors. The team disbanded shortly after without any formal announcement.

On January 31, 2018, SMC returned to the ABL as name sponsor of Alab Pilipinas.

== Final roster ==
San Miguel Beermen roster
Players

| Pos. | # | POB | Name | Height | Weight | DOB (YYYY–MM–DD) | From |
|---|---|---|---|---|---|---|---|
| PG | 1 | (Philippines) | Jeric Fortuna | 5 ft 7 in (1.70 m) | 180 lb (82 kg) | | UST |
| PG | 2 | (Philippines) | Chris Banchero | 6 ft 1 in (1.85 m) | 185 lb (84 kg) | | Seattle Pacific |
| G | 3 | (Philippines) | Christian Luanzon | 6 ft 4 in (1.93 m) | 190 lb (86 kg) | | UST |
| SF | 6 | (Philippines) | Val Acuña | 6 ft 4 in (1.93 m) | 179 lb (81 kg) | | UE |
| F/C | 11 | (Philippines) | Hans Thiele | 6 ft 5 in (1.96 m) | 200 lb (91 kg) | | UE |
| PG | 12 | (Philippines) | Paolo Hubalde | 5 ft 11 in (1.80 m) | 170 lb (77 kg) | | UE |
| G/F | 15 | (Philippines) | JR Cawaling | 6 ft 2 in (1.88 m) | | | Far Eastern |
| G | 18 | (Philippines) | Leo Avenido | 6 ft 1 in (1.85 m) | 170 lb (77 kg) | | Far Eastern |
| SG | 23 | (Philippines) | R.J. Rizada | 6 ft 2 in (1.88 m) | 180 lb (82 kg) | | Far Eastern |
| F/C | 24 | (United States) | Justin Williams (I) | 6 ft 10 in (2.08 m) | 260 lb (118 kg) | | Wyoming |
| F/C | 30 | (Philippines) | Eric Menk | 6 ft 6 in (1.98 m) | 220 lb (100 kg) | | Lake Superior State |
| F/C | 33 | (United States) | Brian Williams (I) | 6 ft 10 in (2.08 m) | 275 lb (125 kg) | | Tennessee |
| SF | 63 | (Switzerland) | Michael Burtscher | 6 ft 6 in (1.98 m) | 210 lb (95 kg) | | Clearwater Christian |
| C | 88 | (Philippines) | Asi Taulava | 6 ft 9 in (2.06 m) | 245 lb (111 kg) | | BYU–Hawaii |

Coaches
Head coach
- (Philippines) Leo Austria (Lyceum)
Assistant(s)
- (Philippines) Peter Martin (San Sebastian)
- (Philippines) Oliver Bunyi (De La Salle)
- (Philippines) Freddie Abuda (Cebu)

Legend
- (DP) Unsigned draft pick
- (FA) Free agent
- (S) Suspended
- (I) Import
- Injured

== Coaches ==
- Bobby Parks (2012)
- Leo Austria (2013)

== Notable players ==
- (Philippines) Junjun Cabatu
- (Philippines) Leo Avenido
- (Philippines) Chris Banchero
- (Philippines) June Mar Fajardo
- (Philippines) Asi Taulava
- (Philippines) Eric Menk
- (Philippines) John Ferriols
- (Philippines) Christian Luanzon
- (Philippines) Kelvin dela Peña
- (United States) Brian Williams
- (United States) Gabe Freeman
- (Philippines) Froilan Baguion
- (United States) Matt Rogers
- (Philippines) Jeric Fortuna
- (United States) Justin Williams
- (United States) Richard Jeter
- (United States) Jarrid Famous
- (United States) Duke Crews
- (United States) Nick Fazekas
- (Philippines) Roger Yap
- (Philippines) Benedict Fernandez
- (Philippines) Val Acuna
- (Philippines) Axel Doruelo
- (Philippines) Michael Burtscher
- (Philippines) R.J. Rizada
- (Philippines) JR Cawaling
- (Philippines) Paolo Hubalde

=== Retired numbers ===
The retired numbers of the San Miguel Beermen hanging in the rafters of the Ynares Sports Arena belong to those who played for the original San Miguel Beermen team in the Philippine Basketball Association, not the ABL team.

San Miguel Beermen retired numbers
| N° | Player | Position | Tenure |
| 8 | Allan Caidic | F | 1993-1998 ^{[a]} |
| 9 | Samboy Lim | F | 1987-1997 |
| 12 | Yves Dignadice | F | 1987-1997 |
| 14 | Hector Calma | G | 1986-1994 |
| 17 | Olsen Racela | G | 1997–2011 ^{[b]} |
| 19 | Ramon Fernandez | C | 1988-1995 ^{[b]} |

- ^{a} – retired during the 2000 PBA season after announcing Caidic's retirement. Jersey number retired together with Barangay Ginebra San Miguel
- ^{b} – retired during the 2010-11 PBA season
- ^{c} – retired during the 1995 PBA season

== See also ==
- San Miguel Beermen (PBA team)
