= Cavite State University Cavite City Campus =

Public university in Cavite, Philippines

Cavite State University- Cavite City Campus
- Motto: Truth, Excellence, Service
- Type: State University
- Established: 2001
- Academic affiliations: Philippine Association of State Universities and Colleges; State Colleges and Universities Athletic Association
- President: Hernando D. Robles
- Dean: Maria Cristina J. Baesa, MAEd. (Campus Administrator)
- Faculty: 90
- Administrative staff: 10+
- Students: 2,500+
- Location: Barangay 8, Pulo II, Dalahican, Cavite, Philippines; 14°11′56″N 120°52′53″E
- Newspaper: The Green Horizon Group of Publications
- Colors: Aquamarine & black
- Nickname: Sharks
- Website: www.cvsu.edu.ph
- Location in Luzon Location in the Philippines

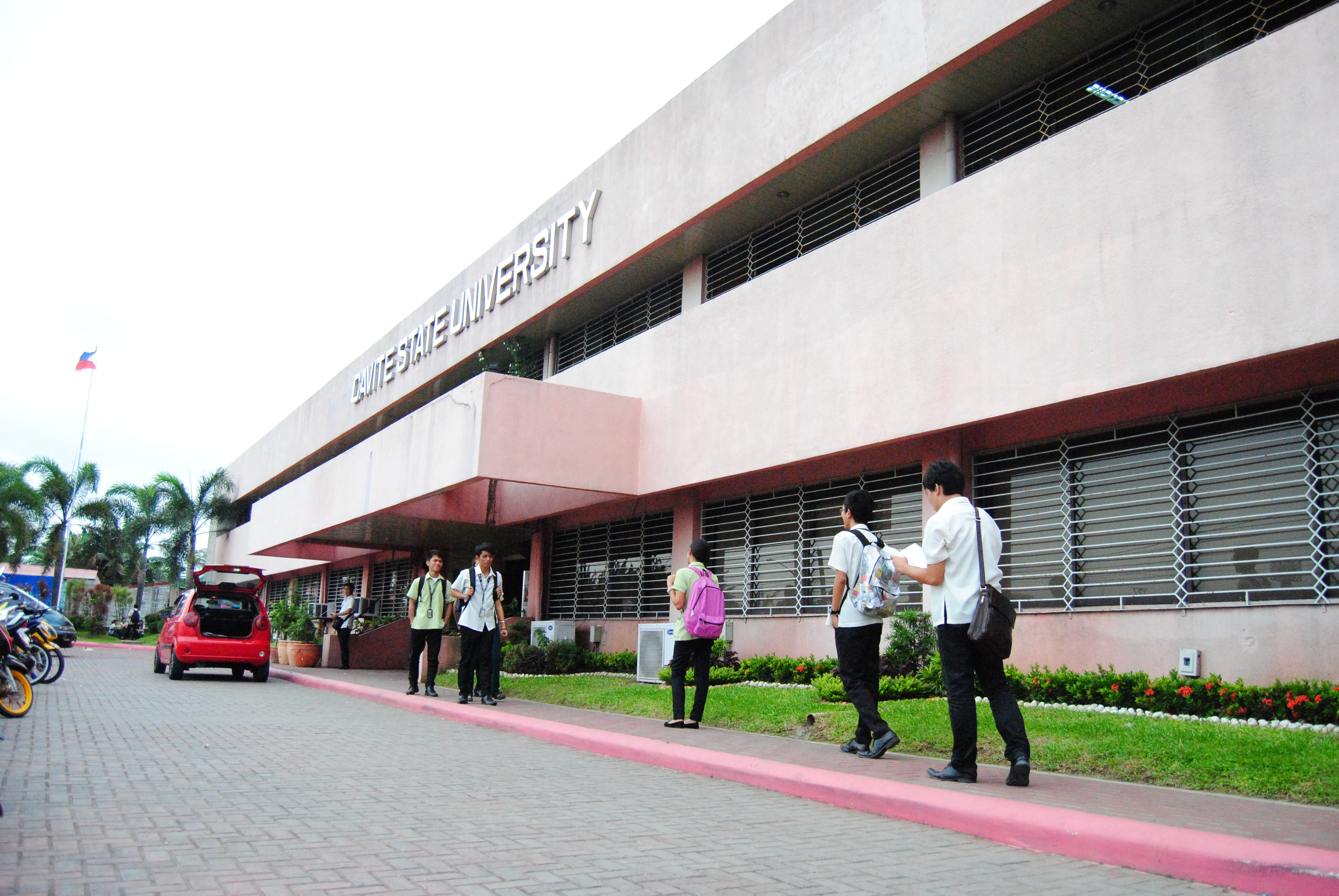
Cavite State University- Cavite City Campus

Cavite State University- Cavite City Campus (CvSU-CCC), formerly known as Cavite State University- Cavite Viejo Campus, is a satellite campus of Cavite State University, a state university in the province of Cavite in the Philippines. It is located beside Manila-Cavite Road (National Road 62) in Barangay 8, Pulo II, Dalahican, Cavite City. Established in 2001, it is one of eleven campuses of the university.

== Notable alumni ==
- Efren Penaflorida
