= Rudy Lingganay =

Filipino basketball player

Personal information
- Born: August 15, 1986 (age 40) Zamboanga City, Philippines
- Listed height: 5 ft 10 in (1.78 m)
- Listed weight: 170 lb (77 kg)

Career information
- High school: Southern City Colleges (Zamboanga City)
- College: UE
- PBA draft: 2010: undrafted
- Drafted by: Powerade Tigers
- Playing career: 2011–present
- Position: Point guard

Career history
- 2011–2012: Powerade Tigers
- 2012–2014: GlobalPort Batang Pier
- 2014: Kia Sorento
- 2014–2015: NLEX Road Warriors
- 2017: TNT KaTropa
- 2017–2018: CLS Knights Indonesia
- 2018–2020: Makati Super Crunch
- 2021: Pasig Sta. Lucia Realtors
- 2022: Tanduay Rum Masters / Batangas City Embassy Chill
- 2023: Zamboanga Valientes
- 2024: Batangas City Tanduay Rum Masters
- 2025: Zamboanga Valientes

Rudy Briones Lingganay Jr. (born August 15, 1986) is a Filipino professional basketball player.

On November 27, 2014, he was traded to the NLEX Road Warriors in exchange for Eliud Poligrates. He later played for several MPBL and one TAT team, Titans Pilipinas.

== PBA career statistics ==
Legend
GP	Games played	MPG	Minutes per game
FG%	Field-goal percentage	3P%	3-point field-goal percentage	FT%	Free-throw percentage
RPG	Rebounds per game	APG	Assists per game	SPG	Steals per game
BPG	Blocks per game	PPG	Points per game	**Bold**	Career high

Correct as of 2017–18 season

=== Season-by-season averages ===
Year	Team	GP	MPG	FG%	3P%	FT%	RPG	APG	SPG	BPG	PPG
2011–12	Powerade	**43**	12.1	**.442**	.314	.795	1.6	**1.7**	.5	.0	4.4
2012–13	GlobalPort	27	13.4	.378	.300	**.833**	1.5	1.1	**.7**	.0	3.5
2013–14	GlobalPort	16	11.1	.425	.357	.000	1.4	.9	.3	.0	2.8
2014–15	Kia / NLEX	32	**16.9**	.404	.296	.821	**1.9**	1.6	.6	.0	**5.2**
2017–18	TNT	8	6.5	.333	**.444**	.667	1.1	1.0	.0	.0	2.3
Career		126	12.0	.396	.342	.623	1.5	1.3	.4	.0	3.6
