= Cavite State University =

Public university in Cavite, Philippines

- Pamantasang Pampamahalaan ng Cavite (Filipino)
- Other name: CvSU
- Former names: Indang Intermediate School (1906); Indang Farm School (1918); Indang Rural High School (1927); Don Severino National Agriculture School (1958); Don Severino Agricultural College (1964)
- Motto: Truth, Integrity, Excellence, Service
- Type: State university
- Established: 1906
- Academic affiliations: Philippine Association of State Universities and Colleges; State Colleges and Universities Athletic Association
- President: Maria Agnes P. Nuestro
- Students: 22,000+ as of July 2024
- Location: Bancod, Indang, Cavite, Philippines (main campus); 14.198758°N 120.881493°E
- Campus: 12 other campuses
- Colors
- Website: www.cvsu.edu.ph
- Location in Luzon Location in the Philippines

Cavite State University (CvSU; (Note: Tagalog pronunciation: [/ˈkab.su/]) Filipino: Pamantasang Pampamahalaan ng Cavite) is a public university in the province of Cavite, Philippines. Its 70-hectare (170-acre) main campus, known as the Don Severino delas Alas Campus, is located in Indang, about 60 km (37 mi) southwest of Manila. The institution has 12 other campuses spread throughout the province.

The school was initially established as an intermediate school by the Thomasites, a group of American teachers brought by the United States during the early part of the American colonial period to revamp the country's education system. By 1964, the school had grown into a college known as the Don Severino Agricultural College (DSAC). It became a university on January 22, 1998, and was renamed Cavite State University.

The Accrediting Agency of Chartered Colleges and Universities in the Philippines (AACCUP) recently conferred upon Cavite State University (CvSU) the award for top-performing state university during its annual national conference held at the Waterfront Cebu City Hotel in Cebu City from March 7 to 9. In 2016, CvSU was also recognized as one of the top ten-performing state universities and colleges in accreditation, ranking seventh. The university is also among the top three performing schools in the criminology program in the country.

Since then, the university has expanded, offering 141 undergraduate and graduate programs. As of the end of the 2020–2021 academic year, it had more than 44,000 students and nearly 1,700 faculty and staff across eleven campuses.

== History ==
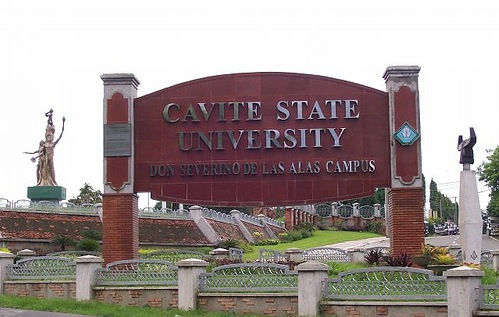
Main gate marker of CvSU-Main in Indang with the Laya at Diwa Monument in the background

The state university was first established by the Thomasites as an intermediate school, named Indang Intermediate School in 1906 with C.E. Workman its first principal. Subsequently, Americans Henry Wise and Joseph Coconower succeeded Workman as the school's principal. In 1915, the school had its first Filipino principal, Mariano Mondoñedo. The school's focused on vocational agriculture for boys and domestic science for girls. In 1918, the name of the school was changed to Indang Farming School.

As enrollment increased, the school site was expanded through the land donations of the citizens of Indang, including Francisco Ocampo and Don Severino de las Alas, Secretary of Interior during the Aguinaldo cabinet. In 1927, the school was renamed Indang Rural High School, during the incumbency of principal Simeon Madlangsakay. It first offered a secondary courses in vocational agriculture in 1923 and Home Economics in 1927.

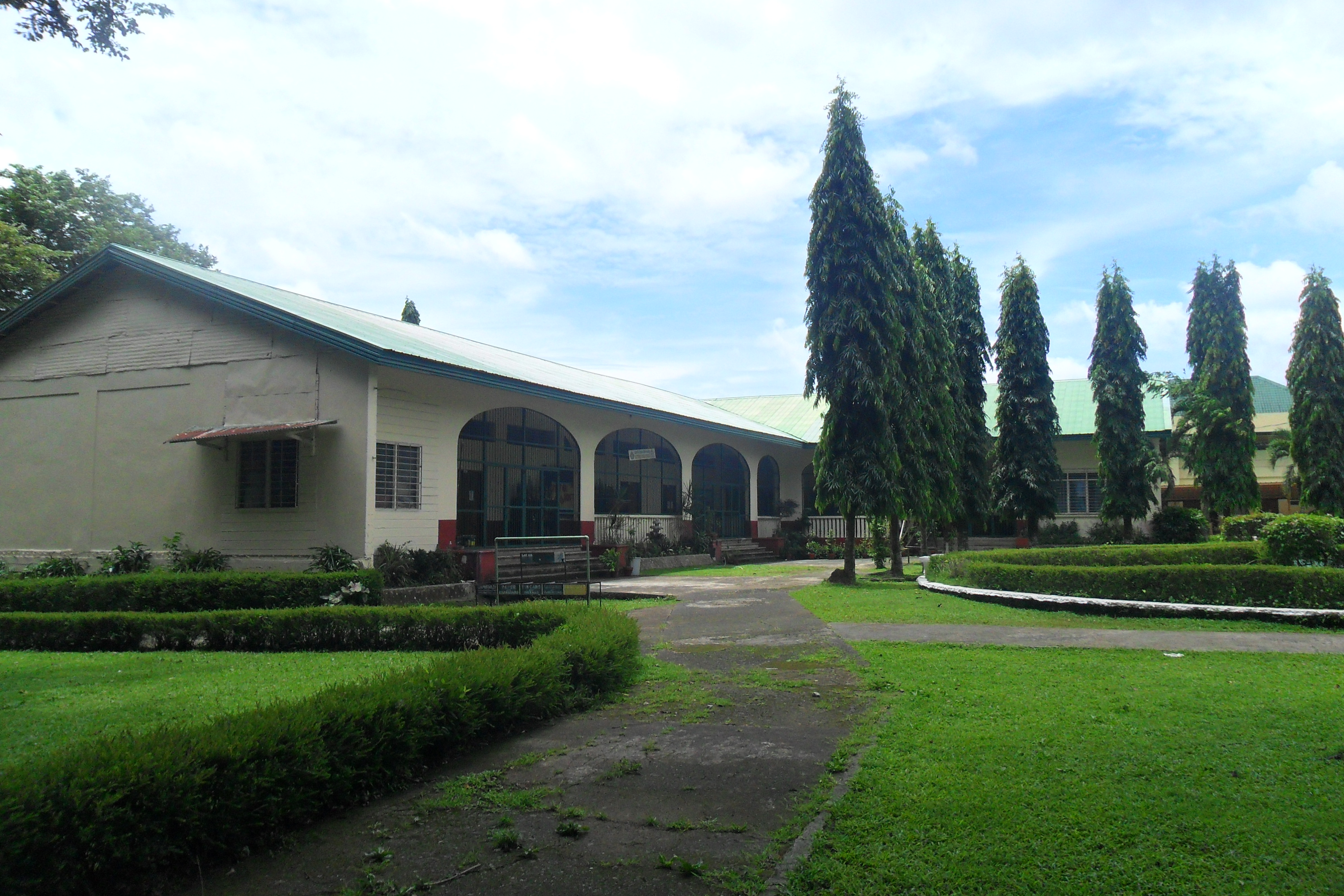
CvSU Science High School occupies the Gabaldon buildings originally used by Indang Rural High School. These structures are the oldest in the Indang campus.

In recognition of the generosity of Don Severino de las Alas to the community, the province of Cavite and the nation, the name of the institution was changed to Don Severino National Agricultural School in 1958 by a congressional action.

=== Don Severino Agricultural College ===
The agricultural school was converted into a state college in 1964 by virtue of Republic Act No. 3917. Under this Act, the school was given its own charter and became known as Don Severino Agricultural College (DSAC).

In 1967, Santiago M. Rolle was appointed as the first college president. In 1971, Certificate in Technical Agriculture was offered. Dr. Sotero L. Lasap designed a new logo for DSAC in 1978. Its shape is like a spaceship supposed to symbolize carrying DSAC to its desired destination.

During the preparatory stage from 1983–1987, Dr. Ruperto S Sangalang became the officer-in-charge of the college.

The transition stage from 1988–1992 strengthened the instructional, research and extension programs through the implementation of the Institutional Development Assistance and Cooperation Project.

=== Elevation to University and Expansion ===
Previous Heads of DSAC/CvSU
Name	Position	Period
Vicente G. Hicaro	Dean and Officer-in-Charge	1965-1967
Santiago M. Rolle	Acting President	1967-1971
Vicente G. Hicaro	Officer-in-Charge	1970-1971
Vicente T. Pinazo	President	1972-1983
Dr. Ruperto S. Sangalang	President	1983-2008
Dr. Divinia C. Chavez	President	2008-2016
Dr. Hernando D. Robles	President	2016–2024
Dr. Ma. Agnes P. Nuestro	President	2024-Present

Following a campaign period from 1993 to 1998, the school became a university on January 22, 1998, by virtue of the Republic Act No. 8468 and was renamed the Cavite State University (CvSU), elevating its four schools into colleges. Dr. Sangalang served as the first university president, a position he will hold until 2008.

In 2002, Cavite College of Fisheries (CACOF) in Naic and Cavite College of Arts and Trade (CCAT) in Rosario were integrated into the Cavite State University system to become the CvSU College of Fisheries and the CvSU College of Arts and Trade, respectively. The Cavite City campus was launched in 2001, and Carmona campus followed in 2002. Subsequently, new campuses were established in other parts of the province, namely, Imus (2003), Trece Martires (2005), Silang (2006), and Tanza (2007).

In 2008, Dr. Divinia Chavez from the College of Education succeeded Dr. Sangalang as the President of the university. She is also the first woman to hold the position. Under her leadership, campuses were established in Bacoor (2008), General Trias (2012) and Maragondon (2015)

Dr. Hernando Robles, former Campus Administrator of CvSU Naic, assumed the role of the University President in 2016. The newest campus, CvSU Dasmariñas Learning Center was established in 2023.

In 2024, Dr. Ma. Agnes P. Nuestro, the then Vice President for Academic Affairs, was voted as the University President. Under leadership, CvSU Magallanes Extension Campus began operations in 2026.

== Campuses ==
Campus	Former names	Date established	Location	Enrolment (Note: As of second semester, AY 2019-2020.)	Website	Notes
Cavite State University - Don Severino de las Alas Campus (Main Campus)	Indang Intermediate School (1906) Indang Farm School (1918) Indang Rural High School (1927) Don Severino National Agriculture School (1958) Don Severino Agricultural College (1964)	1906	Indang	17,581	www.cvsu.edu.ph	Elevated to university status in 1998
Cavite State University - Naic	Cavite College of Fisheries	1961	Naic	1,313	www.cvsu-naic.edu.ph	integrated into CvSU 2002
Cavite State University - CCAT Campus	Cavite College of Arts and Trade Cavite State University Rosario Campus	1969	Rosario	3,357	www.cvsu-rosario.edu.ph	integrated into CvSU 2002
Cavite State University - Cavite City	—N/a	2001	Cavite City	2,339		
Cavite State University - Carmona	—N/a	2002	Carmona	2,303		
Cavite State University - Imus	College of Business and Entrepreneurship	2003	Imus	4,583	www.cvsu-imus.edu.ph	
Cavite State University - Trece Martires	—N/a	2005	Trece Martires	1,148	www.cvsu-trececampus.com	
Cavite State University - Silang	—N/a	2006	Silang	3,175	www.cvsu-silang.edu.ph	
Cavite State University - Tanza	—N/a	2007	Tanza	601		
Cavite State University - Bacoor	—N/a	2008	Bacoor	2,814		
Cavite State University - General Trias	—N/a	2012	General Trias	1,226		
Cavite State University - Maragondon	—N/a	2015	Maragondon	n/a		only offers basic education from pre-elementary to Grade 10
Cavite State University - Dasmariñas City Learning Center	—N/a	2023	Dasmariñas	n/a		

=== Don Severino delas Alas Campus, Indang ===
Indang is the main campus of the university. Known as the Don Severino delas Alas Campus, it sits on 72 hectares of rural land and is the oldest campus of the university. This campus houses academic, administrative, and research and extension facilities. There are also a few residential and commercial buildings in the campus. The main offices for the entire university is also situated here.

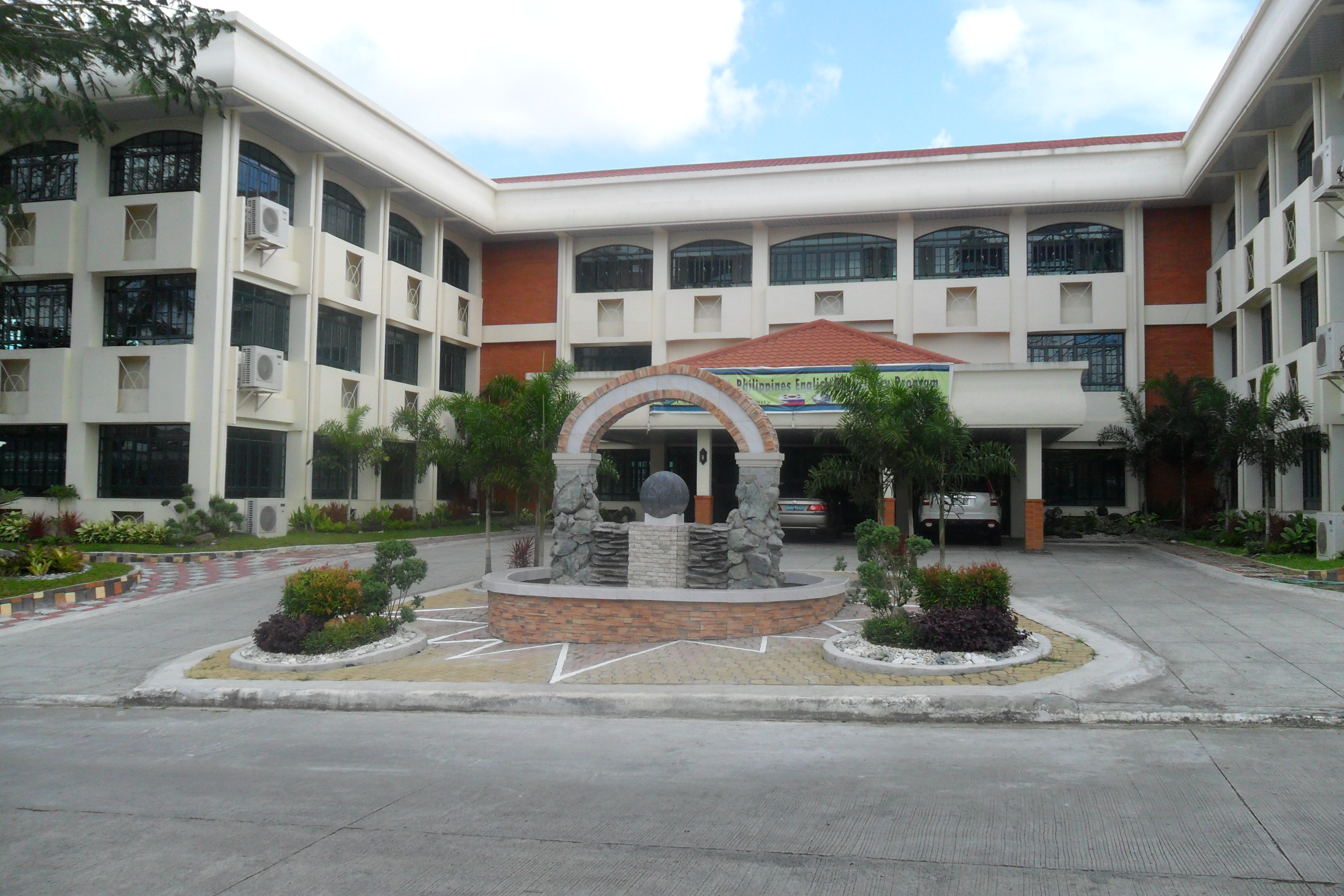
Physical Science Building, Main Campus

The university's main library is called the Ladislao Diwa Memorial Library and Museum. Established in 1980, it has now grown to house around 92,000 volumes of books and more than 5,000 series titles such as magazines and newsletters.

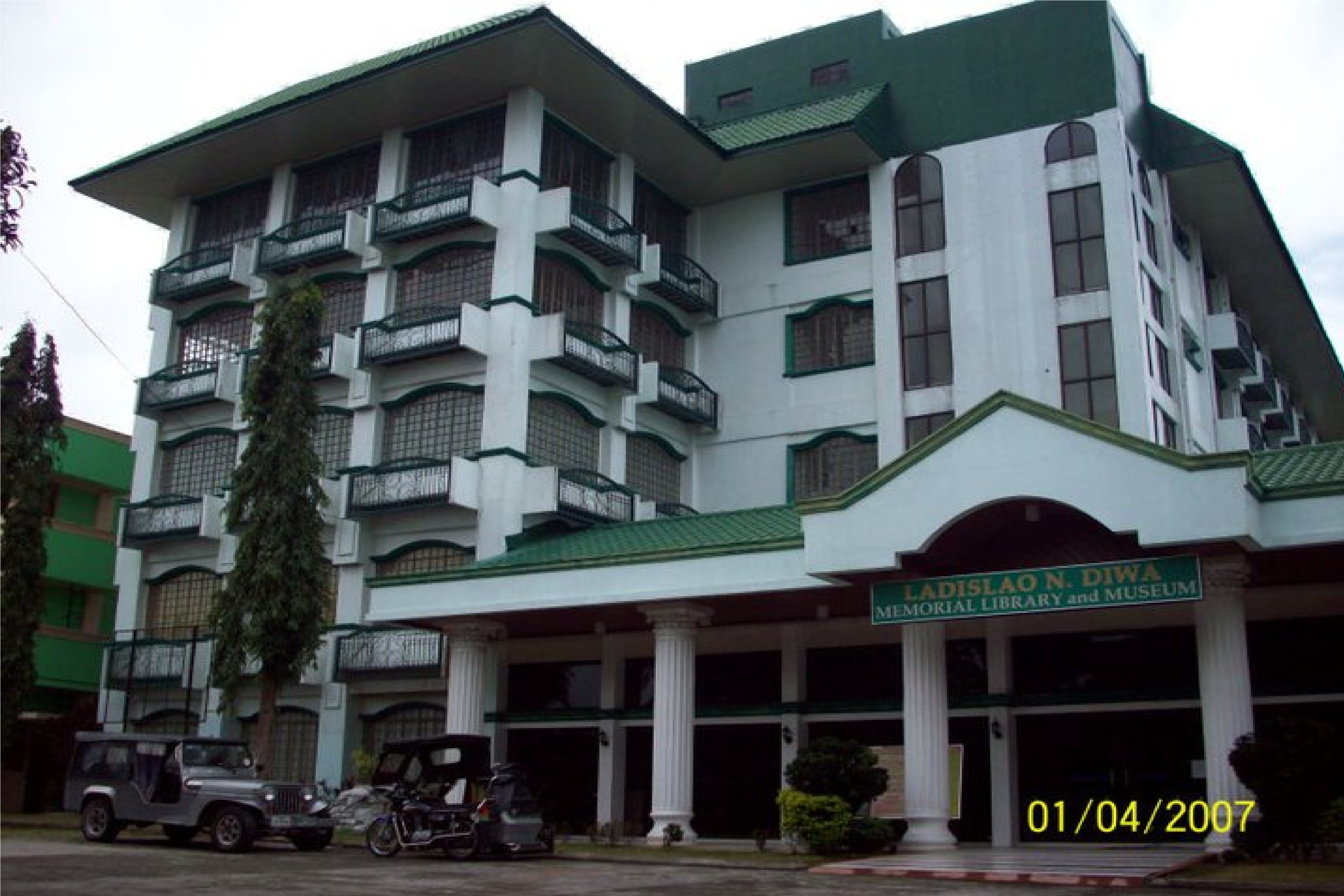
Ladislao Diwa Memorial Library

==== Laya at Diwa Monument ====
The Laya at Diwa brass artwork displayed at the main entrance to the Indang campus is meant to represent the university's vision of "truth, excellence and service". The monument is a creation of Jonnel P. Castrillo of Imus, Cavite. It was inaugurated on December 15, 2006, by Senator Edgardo J. Angara during the university's centenary celebration.

The artwork has five major elements. The first is the unchained female figure, holding a book, her arms interlocked with the male figure. The male figure holds a pen and a torch. The flame of the torch carries the letters CvSU for Cavite State University. Finally, the child figure, in a dynamic pose atop the pillar behind the male & female figure, reaches out a dove, the universal symbol peace and freedom.

=== Imus campus ===
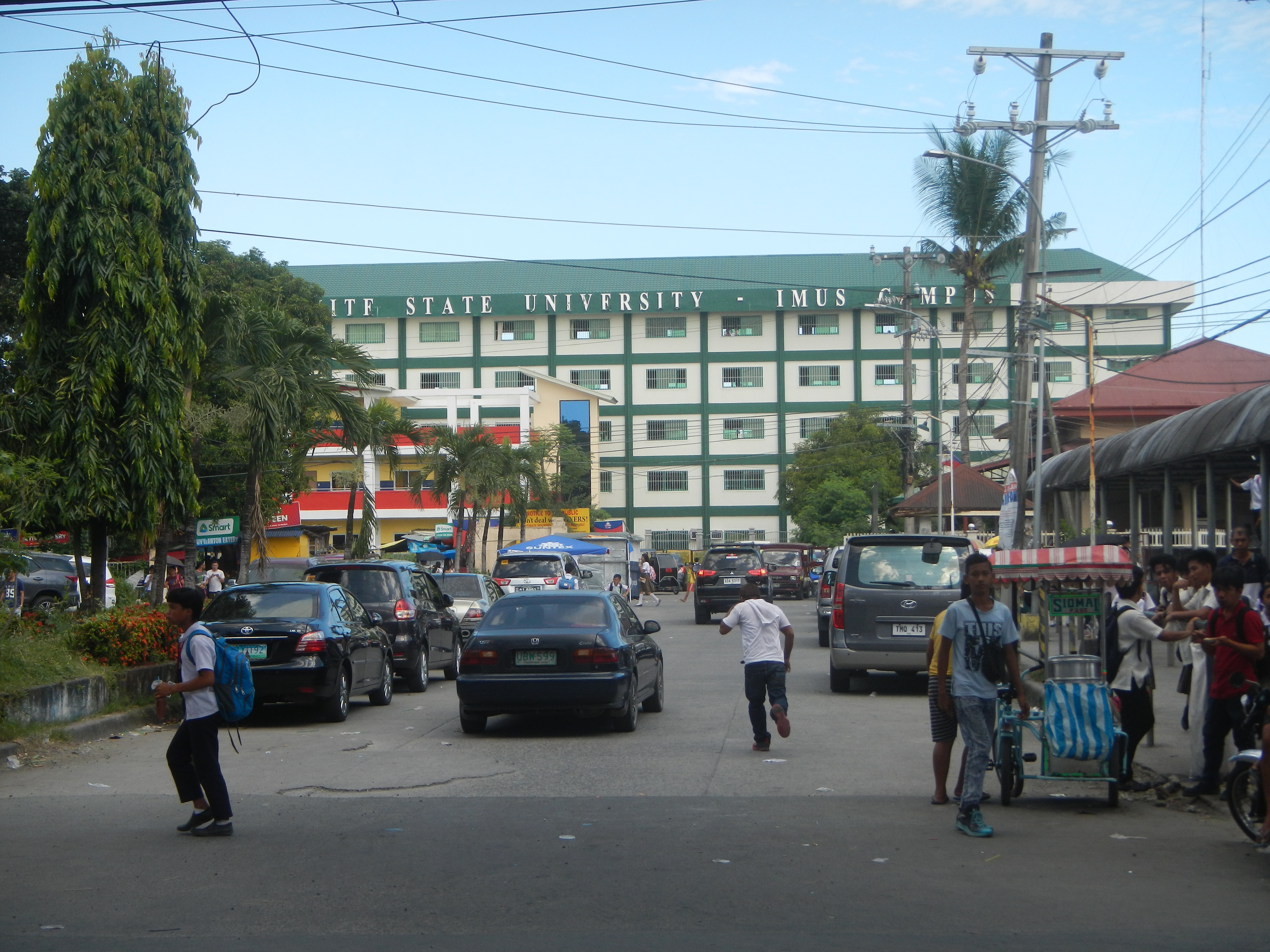
Main Building of the Imus campus

Formerly known as the College of Business and Entrepreneurship, CVSU Imus was established in 2003. It is located along Aguinaldo Highway in Palico IV. It occupies the plot of land that was set to become the Cavite Convention and Trade Center, but was transferred to the university for use as a satellite campus. As of 2023, it has nine academic departments offering 11 degree programs.

=== Silang campus ===
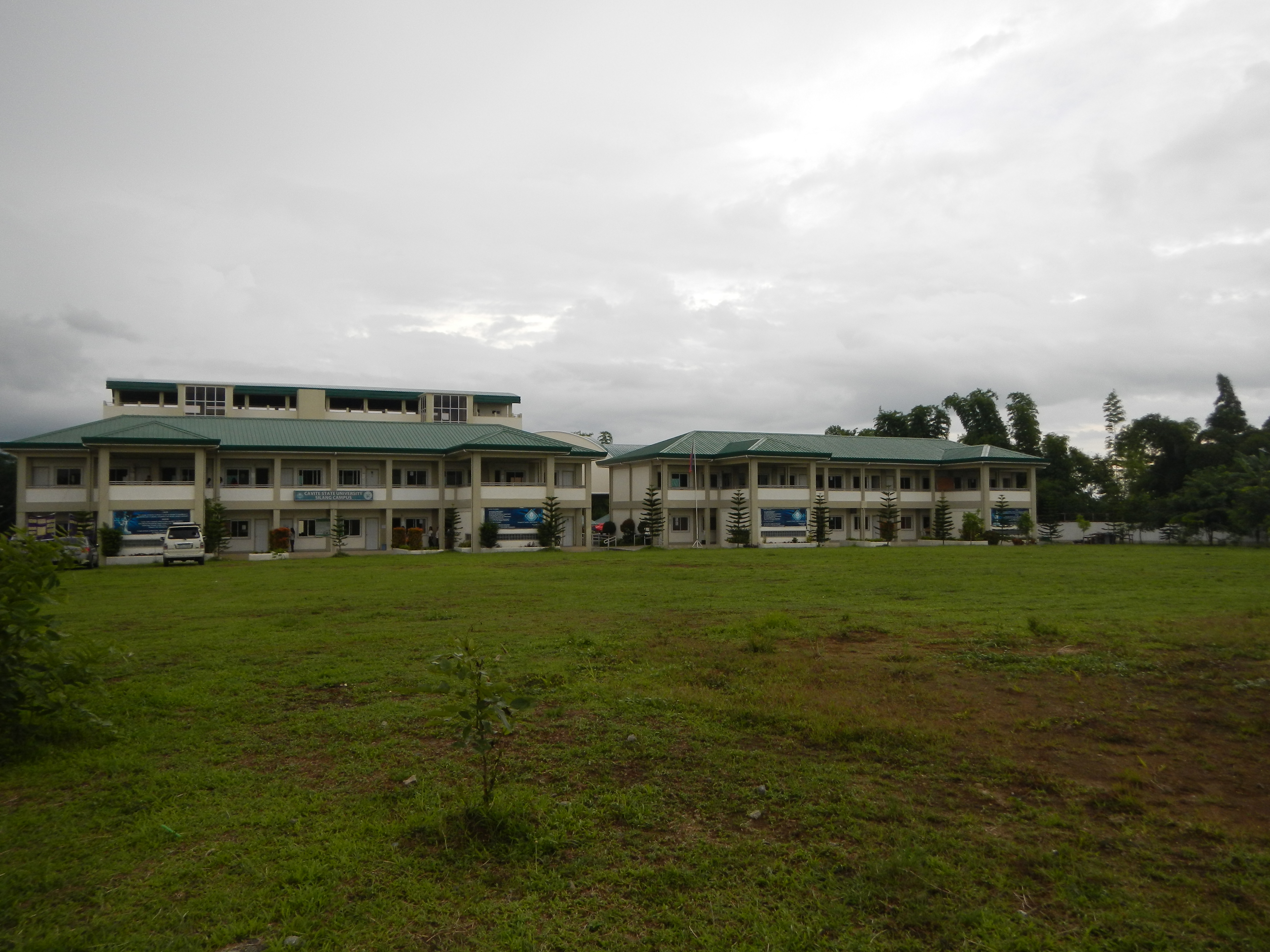
Academic buildings of the Silang campus

The Silang campus was built in 2006 when the municipal government of the town donated land to the university. Several buildings, including three academic buildings and a gymnasium, were built on a 5,000 square meter plot of land. As of 2023, the campus has four academic departments offering eight degree programs.

== Academics ==
Schools and colleges of CvSU
Unit	Foundation
College of Agriculture, Food, Environment and Natural Resources	1964
College of Arts and Sciences	1992
College of Criminal Justice	2010
College of Economics, Management and Development Studies	1998
College of Education	1992
College of Engineering and Information Technology	1992
College of Medicine	2022
College of Nursing	2005
College of Sports, Physical Education and Recreation	1998
College of Veterinary Medicine and Biomedical Sciences	2000
College of Tourism and Hospitality Management	2025
Graduate School	1985

The university has eleven colleges in its main campus in Indang. Originally an agricultural school, CvSU has grown to become a comprehensive university offering 43 undergraduate degrees, a degree in veterinary medicine, a Doctor of Medicine degree, 13 masters degrees and 3 degrees leading to a Ph.D.

When the Don Severino National Agricultural School was elevated to a state college in 1964, it started to offer its first undergraduate degrees in two fields: agriculture and agricultural education. This department would later be the origin of the three other colleges in the Indang campus. In 2005, it was renamed the College of Agriculture, Food, Environment and Natural Resources. Today, it offers degrees in agriculture, food technology, and environmental sciences. In 2016, it was recognized as a Center of Excellence in Agriculture by the Commission on Higher Education, one of only eight in the country.

The Graduate School was established in 1985 with the first postgraduate degrees of the college: master of science in agricultural education; animal husbandry and agronomy.

In 1992, the college reorganized its departments in preparation for its elevation as a university. Four departments emerged and were elevated into schools: Agriculture, Arts and Sciences, Education and Engineering. After DSAC's successful elevation into a state university in 1998, all schools were renamed colleges. In addition, two more colleges were created: the College of Sports, Physical Education and Recreation; and the College of Economics, Management and Development Studies.

In the 2000s, new academic divisions were created. The College of Veterinary Medicine and Biomedical Sciences was separated from the College of Agriculture in 2000. The College of Nursing was established in 2005 as a result of rapid growth from its initial status of a program in the College of Arts and Sciences in 2003. And then finally, in 2010, the College of Criminal Justice was established.

In 2022, the College of Medicine started to admit students. It is also the second public medical school in the Southern Tagalog region, after the medical school of the Batangas State University.

In 2025, the College of Tourism, Hospitality and Management was established by virtue of Board Resolution No. 37, Series of 2024. The new College offers two courses: Bachelor of Science in Tourism Management and Bachelor of Science in Hospitality Management.

The university also manages basic education units in its Indang campus, namely the Child Development Center offering pre-school and elementary programs; and the Laboratory Science High School, offering both junior and senior high school programs. The Naic, Rosario and Silang campuses hosts junior and senior high school programs.

In 2025, the main campus accepted only 7,490 out of 21,739 applicants. This represents an 34.45% acceptance rate.

== Research and Extension ==
In 2008, the university started to host the Southern Tagalog Agriculture, Aquatic and Resources Research, Development and Extension Consortium (STAARDEC). It is a regional consortium that facilitates collaboration amongst its members to boost sustainable agro-industrial development in the Region IV-A. Today, it has 21 member institutions, including state universities and colleges, research and development institutions and government agencies.

The university also publishes its official peer-reviewed journal, the CvSU Research Journal, bi-annually.

=== Research Centers ===
Cavite State University hosts several research centers.

The Affiliated Renewable Energy Center (AREC) for Region IV-A was established in 1987, one of the first in the country. It is tasked to "encourag[e], and accelerat[e] the exploration, development and utilization of renewable energy resources" in the country. AREC is now known for its expertise in biogas technology. It has produced faculty with specialization in renewable energy and has produced patents for biogas technology.

The National Coffee Research, Development and Extension Center (NCRDEC) was established in 2005. It leads the nation for coffee research and development with the goal of putting back Filipino coffee back into the international market.

On the other hand, the Sugar Palm Research, Information, and Trade Center (SPRINT Center) was established in 2010, aiming to develop research on sugar palm (kaong).

In 2014, the CvSU Bee Program commenced operations. It aims to promote the practice of beekeeping in the province of Cavite and surrounding areas. It also conducts research to improve beekeeping practices and post-harvest technologies. In 2023, the program was renamed Bee Research, Innovation, Trade, and Extension Center (BRITE Center).

The Simulation, Modelling and Measurement Laboratory (SiMM Lab) was inaugurated in 2021. It assists researchers to simulate machines and devices for prototyping. It was established in cooperation with the Philippine Department of Science and Technology.

== Student Life ==
In the main campus as of 2022, there are 84 student organisations ranging from academic, performing, and religious to non-academic organisations and student councils. The official student publication of the Indang campus is The Gazette.

In the fields of athletics, CvSU Green Hornets participate in the Southern Tagalog Regional Association of State Universities and Colleges.

== See also ==
- Cavite State University Cavite City Campus
- Cavite State University Rosario Campus
