= Bangkok Cobras =

Basketball team from Bangkok, Thailand

- Founded: 2011
- Withdrew: 2012
- History: Bangkok Cobras (2011–2012)
- Arena: Chulalongkorn Sports Centre
- Capacity: 2,000
- Location: Bangkok
- Team colours: Orange, black
| Home | Away |

The Bangkok Cobras were a professional basketball team from Thailand, Southeast Asia, that last played in the Asean Basketball League.

== Roster (2012) ==
Note: Flags indicate national team eligibility at FIBA-sanctioned events. Players may hold other non-FIBA nationalities not displayed.

Bangkok Cobras roster
Players
Coaches

| Pos. | No. | Nat. | Name | Ht. | Wt. | Age |
|---|---|---|---|---|---|---|
| G/F | 3 | (Thailand) | Kittimon, Wanna | 1.88 m (6 ft 2 in) | 77 kg (170 lb) |
| F | 6 | (Thailand) | Chalormdech, Limsuwan |
| G | 8 | (Philippines) | Cruz, Marvin | 1.73 m (5 ft 8 in) |
| G | 9 | (Thailand) | Apiromvilaichai, Darunpong | 1.85 m (6 ft 1 in) |
| G/F | 12 | (Thailand) | Kruatiwa, Ratdech | 1.91 m (6 ft 3 in) | 83 kg (183 lb) |
| F/C | 14 | (United States) | Lewis, Gentry | 2.06 m (6 ft 9 in) | 109 kg (240 lb) |
| C | 22 | (Thailand) | Kaedum, Chaiwat | 1.95 m (6 ft 5 in) |
| F | 45 | (United States) | Earl, Mark | 2.03 m (6 ft 8 in) | 82 kg (181 lb) |
| F/C | 66 | (Thailand) | Kongum, Danai | 1.96 m (6 ft 5 in) | 94 kg (207 lb) |
| F | 91 | (Thailand) | Klahan, Chanachon | 1.90 m (6 ft 3 in) |
| F | 8 | (Guyana) | George, Travis | 2.09 m (6 ft 10 in) | 113 kg (249 lb) |
| G | 15 | (Philippines) | Reyes, Jai | 1.72 m (5 ft 8 in) |

Head coach

- (United States) Joe Bryant

Assistant coach(es)

- (United Kingdom) PJ D'Rozario

Legend

- (C) Team captain
- Injured

- Roster
Updated: 15 March 2012

== See also ==
- Thailand Tigers
