= Misamis Oriental Meteors =

- Leagues: Liga Pilipinas (2008–2011)
- Founded: 2008
- Dissolved: 2011
- History: Misamis Oriental Meteors (2008–2011)
- Arena: Xavier University Gym
- Location: Cagayan de Oro
- Team colors
- Head coach: Agripino Noel
- Championships: 2 2009 Liga Pilipinas Conference II Champions; 2011 Liga Pilipinas Conference V Champions

The Misamis Oriental Meteors is a Philippine basketball team that is a participant in the third-tier (after the PBA and the PBL) community league Liga Pilipinas. It is based in the province of Misamis Oriental in Mindanao, and its main sponsor is the provincial governor, Gov. Oscar Moreno. The team won the National Finals of the Second Conference of the Liga Pilipinas against the First Conference Champions M' Lhuillier Kwarta Padala-Cebu Niños, 3-2. The Meteors were also in the National Finals of the Third Conference of the Liga, which they lost to the same team (MLKP-Cebu). The Meteors also represented the Philippines in the 2nd China-Asean Basketball Tournament held in Pingguo County, Guangxi, China in October 18–24, 2009, winning the championship by beating the Guangxi basketball team and had an elimination-round average of 92.5 points. The Meteors successfully defended their title in the 2010 edition by again beating Guangxi by 96-67. The Meteors participated in the Tournament of the Philippines (TOP), a merger of the Philippine Basketball League and Liga Pilipinas.

== Roster ==
Misamis Oriental Meteors roster
Players
Coaches

| Pos. | No. | Nat. | Name | Ht. |
|---|---|---|---|---|
| PG | 8 | (Philippines) | Moreño, Mark | 1.72 m (5 ft 8 in) |
| SG | 13 | (Philippines) | Misa, Khiel | 1.77 m (5 ft 10 in) |
| G/F | 16 | (Philippines) | Saldua, Eder John | 1.90 m (6 ft 3 in) |
| C | 17 | (Philippines) | Lamocha, Ronald |
| C | 21 | (Philippines) | Guiyab, Arden | 1.95 m (6 ft 5 in) |
| C | 25 | (Philippines) | Barcellano, Francis | 1.98 m (6 ft 6 in) |
| SG | 99 | (Philippines) | Gudez, Lyndon | 1.80 m (5 ft 11 in) |
| F/C | | (Philippines) | Capati, Ron | 1.96 m (6 ft 5 in) |
| PG | | (Philippines) | Billones, Egay | 1.75 m (5 ft 9 in) |
| F | | (Philippines) | Daa, Dino | 1.91 m (6 ft 3 in) |
| G/F | | (Philippines) | Larong, Ardy | 1.88 m (6 ft 2 in) |
| F/C | | (Philippines) | Gerilla, JR | 1.96 m (6 ft 5 in) |
| C | | (Philippines) | Bono, Ken | 1.96 m (6 ft 5 in) |
| G | | (Philippines) | Lingganay, Rudy | 1.80 m (5 ft 11 in) |

Head coach

- (Philippines) Agripino Noel

Assistant coach(es)

- (Philippines) Bong Abad
- (Philippines) Jaime Rivera

Legend

- (C) Team captain
- Injured

- Roster
Updated: April 26, 2010

== Notable players ==
- Mark Moreno
- Khiel Misa
- Eder John Saldua
- Ronald Lamocha
- Arden Guiyab
- Francis Barcellano
- Lyndon Gudez
- Ron Capati
- Egay Billones
- Dino Daa
- Ardy Larong
- JR Gerilla
- Ken Bono
- Rudy Lingganay
- Mark Yee
- Joey Mente
- Jeff Bombeo
- Jerome Paterno
- Dexter Micutuan

== Former players ==
Players who formerly played for the Meteors were MVP Mark Yee (signed up with Burger King in the PBA), Joey Mente, Jeff Bombeo, Jerome Paterno and Dexter Micutuan.
