= 2013 ABL season =

2013 ABL Regular Season
- League: ASEAN Basketball League
- Sport: Basketball
- Duration: 11 January 2013 – 19 May 2013
- Teams: 6

ABL season
- Season MVP: Asi Taulava (San Miguel)

2013 ABL Finals
- Champions: San Miguel Beermen
- Runners-up: Indonesia Warriors

ABL seasons
- ← 2012 2014 →

The 2013 ASEAN Basketball League Regular Season was the fourth season of competition of the ASEAN Basketball League (ABL) since its establishment. A total of six teams competed in the league. The regular season began on 11 January 2013 and ended on 19 May 2013. Two teams from the previous season, inaugural champions AirAsia Philippine Patriots and Bangkok Cobras did not return for the current season.

== Preseason ==
The ABL underwent contraction after it was announced that the Bangkok Cobras and the AirAsia Philippine Patriots would not be returning for the current season. The Brunei Barracudas, who were on leave for the 2012 season, were not announced to the list of active teams for 2013.

A new format was announced for the regular season, where the teams will play each four times, twice at home and twice away, a deviation from the earlier seasons where teams played each other thrice. Also, the league added Hoops Fest to the regular season schedule. The mid-season tournament was played over two days and the two games played by each team counted towards their regular season records. The playoff format was also changed: both the semifinals and the finals will be best-of-five series, instead of best-of-three in the previous seasons (in the inaugural season, the finals was a best-of-five series).

== Arenas ==
Locations of the northern ABL teams.
Locations of the southern ABL teams.

Team	Location	Arena	Head coach
Thailand Slammers	Bangkok	Nimibutr Stadium	(United States) Joe Bryant
Indonesia Warriors	North Jakarta	The BritAma Arena	(United States) John Todd Purves
Saigon Heat	Ho Chi Minh City	Tân Bình Stadium	(United States) Jason Rabedeaux
San Miguel Beermen	Pasig	Ynares Sports Arena	(Philippines) Leo Austria
Singapore Slingers	Singapore	Singapore Indoor Stadium	(Singapore) Neo Beng Siang
Westports Malaysia Dragons	Kuala Lumpur	MABA Stadium	(Philippines) Ariel Vanguardia

== Standings ==
Team	GP	W	L	PCT	GB	PD
(Philippines) San Miguel Beermen	22	19	3	86	–	252
Indonesia Warriors	22	16	6	73	3	149
Westports Malaysia Dragons	22	12	10	57	7	59
Thailand Slammers	22	8	14	36	11	−40
Singapore Slingers	22	7	15	32	12	−175
(Vietnam) Saigon Heat	22	4	18	18	15	−243

Qualified to the Playoffs
Eliminated

== Results ==
- Score of the home team is listed first.
- In case where a game went into overtime, the number of asterisks denotes the number of overtime periods played.
- Results of the ABL Hoops Fest are not included in the tables.

=== First and second round ===
Home \ Away	STS	IW	SH	SMB	SIN	WMD
Thailand		74–90	75–77	73–77	65–62	83–91
Indonesia	69–60		83–74	53–64	61–48	68–67
Saigon	58–76	77–72		92–89	72–76	70–80
San Miguel	78–61	96–98	100–74		78–57	77–66
Singapore	56–50	57–69	80–69	55–66		68–67
Malaysia	65–77	72–79	75–64	82–76	75–56	

Legend: Blue = home team win; Red = away team win.
Matches with lighter background shading were decided after overtime.

=== Third and fourth round ===
Home \ Away	STS	IW	SH	SMB	SIN	WMD
Thailand		74–83	71–63	70–78	56–62	68–63
Indonesia	83–72		82–68	52–57	64–39	85–86
Saigon	75–90	63–77		49–101	62–63	89–78
San Miguel	76–69	77–66	71–69		80–69	80–62
Singapore	49–73	53–63	91–77	61–68		72–82
Malaysia	83–66	80–79	93–84	104–107***	93–63	

Legend: Blue = home team win; Red = away team win.
Matches with lighter background shading were decided after overtime.

=== ABL Hoops Fest ===
The first ever ABL Hoops Fest, an annual mid-season showcase of the league, was added in the 2013 ABL season on 4 March 2013. All six teams will converge on a host city for the three-day contest, which will also include a slam dunk and three point shootout contest. The matchups are made via a random draw during the pre-season. Points obtained during Hoops Fest will count towards the teams’ total points for the regular season. Saigon, Vietnam was chosen as the host for the first edition of the competition, which was held 15 March 2013 to 17 March 2013.

15 March

Indonesia Warriors 74, Thailand Slammers 67

Tân Bình Stadium

15 March

Singapore Slingers 53, San Miguel Beermen 73

Tân Bình Stadium

15 March

Westports Malaysia Dragons 90, Saigon Heat 69

Tân Bình Stadium

17 March

Thailand Slammers 58, Singapore Slingers 56

Tân Bình Stadium

17 March

San Miguel Beermen 80, Saigon Heat 55

Tân Bình Stadium

17 March

Indonesia Warriors 84, Westports Malaysia Dragons 67

Tân Bình Stadium

== Statistical leaders ==
Category	Player	Team	Stat
Points per game	Justin Howard	Saigon Heat	20.43
Rebounds per game	Rashad Jones-Jennings	Singapore Slingers	15.14
Assists per game	Froilan Baguion	Thailand Slammers	9.24
Steals per game	Chris Daniels	Indonesia Warriors	2.73
Blocks per game	Christien Charles	Thailand Slammers	4.11
Turnovers per game	Froilan Baguion	Thailand Slammers	4.52
FT%	Loh Shee Fai	Westports Malaysia Dragons	1.000
3FG%	Steven Thomas	Indonesia Warriors	1.000

== Playoffs ==
The 2013 ABL playoffs started on 23 May 2013 and concluded with the San Miguel Beermen sweeping the Indonesia Warriors in the 2013 ABL Finals to claim the team's first ever ABL title.

Semifinals
1	San Miguel	3
4	Sports Rev Thailand	1
2	Indonesia	3
3	Westports Malaysia	0

Finals
1	San Miguel	3
2	Indonesia	0

=== Semifinals ===
The semi-finals is a best-of-five series, with the higher seeded team hosting Game 1 and 2, and 5, if necessary.

Team 1	Series	Team 2	Game 1	Game 2	Game 3	Game 4	Game 5
San Miguel Beermen (Philippines)	3–1	Thailand Slammers	60–92	91–60	70–62	77–61	—
Indonesia Warriors	3–0	Westports Malaysia Dragons	72–63	77–65	81–64	—	—

=== Finals ===
The Finals is a best-of-five series, with the higher seeded team hosting Game 1 and 2, and 5, if necessary.

Semi-final 1 winner	Series	Semi-final 2 winner	Game 1	Game 2	Game 3	Game 4	Game 5
San Miguel Beermen (Philippines)	3–0	Indonesia Warriors	75–70	66–65	70–55	—	—
