= Liga Pilipinas =

Former basketball league in Philippines

- Sport: Basketball
- Founded: 2008
- Folded: 2011
- Motto: "Ang Rebolusyon ng Basketbol" ("The Revolution of Basketball")
- Country: Philippines
- Last champion: Misamis Oriental Meteors
- Most titles: Cebu Niños (M' Lhuillier Kwarta Padala-Cebu Niños) (3)

Liga Pilipinas was a regional basketball league in the Philippines. It was sanctioned by the Samahang Basketbol ng Pilipinas, the country's national basketball federation, and owned by Pinoy Basketbol, Inc.

== History ==
The National Basketball Conference and the Mindanao Visayas Basketball Association, along with Third Force Inc., were merged to officially form the league. The league's launch was on May 31, and games started on June 18, 2008.

In 2010, a merger between Liga Pilipinas and the Philippine Basketball League was proposed. The professional Philippine Basketball Association had hoped to form a "developmental league" from the two leagues, similar to the NBA Development League of the National Basketball Association. Through an agreement between Liga Pilipinas and the PBL, a joint tournament was held starting in June 2010. The joint tournament was held as a dry-run of the proposed developmental league. The tournament was named the Tournament of the Philippines.

It used Liga Pilipinas' home-and-away leg format where 9 teams were involved, 3 from the Philippine Basketball League and 6 from Liga Pilipinas. The tournament started on June 9, and ended on September 13, 2010, when the M. Lhuillier Kwarta Padala-Cebu Niños became the TOP champions by defeating the Misamis Oriental Meteors in a best-of-five final, 3-2.

After the failure of the merger, the Philippine Basketball Association decided to independently form their own developmental league, called the PBA Developmental League. After the PBA D-League was formed, Liga Pilipinas was able to hold one more tournament before folding in 2011, with Misamis Oriental Meteors winning their second Liga title by defeating Cebu Ninos in the finals of Conference V.

== Tournament of the Philippines teams (2010) ==
- M' Lhuillier Kwarta Padala-Cebu Niños
- Mandaue-Cebu Landmasters
- Misamis Oriental Meteors
- MP-Gensan Warriors
- Treston-Laguna Stallions
- Taguig-Hobe Bihon
- Agri Nurture Inc.-FCA Cultivators (Philippine Basketball League)
- Ascof Lagundi Natural Cough Busters (Philippine Basketball League)
- Cobra Energy Drink Iron Men (Philippine Basketball League)

=== 2010 TOP leg champions ===
1st Leg: M. Lhuillier-Cebu Niños

- Host team: Agri Nurture Inc.-FCA
- Teams in leg: Treston-Laguna Stallions, Ascof Lagundi Natural Cough Busters, Agri Nurture Inc.-FCA, M. Lhuillier-Cebu Niños

2nd Leg: Cobra Energy Drink Iron Men

- Host team: MP-Gensan Warriors
- Teams in leg: Misamis Oriental Meteors, Treston-Laguna Stallions, Cobra Energy Drink Iron Men, MP-Gensan Warriors

3rd leg: Treston-Laguna Stallions

- Host team: Treston-Laguna Stallions
- Teams in Leg: Treston-Laguna Stallions, Cobra Energy Drink Iron Men, Mandaue-Cebu Landmasters, Ascof Lagundi Natural Cough Busters

4th Leg: Misamis Oriental Meteors

- Host team: Mandaue-Cebu Landmasters
- Teams in Leg: Mandaue-Cebu Landmasters, Misamis Oriental Meteors, MP-Gensan Warriors, Agri Nurture Inc.-FCA

5th Leg: Taguig-Hobe Bihon

- Host team: Ascof Lagundi Natural Cough Busters
- Teams in leg: Ascof Lagundi Natural Cough Busters, Taguig-Hobe Bihon, Cobra Energy Drink Iron Men, MP-Gensan Warriors

6th leg: M. Lhuillier-Niños

- Host team: M. Lhuillier-Cebu Niños
- Teams in leg: M. Lhuillier-Cebu Niños, Mandaue-Cebu Landmasters, Taguig-Hobe Bihon, Misamis Oriental Meteors

7th Leg: Cobra Energy Drink Iron Men

- Host team: Cobra Energy Drink Iron Men
- Teams in leg: Cobra Energy Drink Iron Men, M.Lhuillier-Cebu Niños, Agri Nurture Inc.-FCA, MP-Gensan Warriors

8th Leg: M. Lhuillier-Cebu Niños

- Host team: Misamis Oriental Meteors
- Teams in leg: Misamis Oriental Meteors, M. Lhuillier-Cebu Niños, Taguig-Hobe Bihon, Ascof Lagundi Natural Cough Busters

9th Leg: Taguig-Hobe Bihon

- Host team: Taguig-Hobe Bihon
- Teams in leg: Taguig-Hobe Bihon, Agri Nurture Inc.-FCA, Treston-Laguna Stallions, Mandaue-Cebu Landmasters

=== 2010 TOP rankings ===
1. M. Lhuillier-Cebu Niños
2. Misamis Oriental Meteors
3. Taguig-Hobe Bihon
4. Treston-Laguna Stallions
5. Cobra Energy Drink Ironmen
6. Ascof Lagundi Cough Busters
7. Agri Nurture-FCA Cultivators
8. MP-Gensan Warriors
9. Mandaue-Cebu Landmasters (eliminated)

== Champions ==
Season	Conference	Champion	Format	Series	Runner-Up
2008	Conference I	Cebu Niños	3-of-5	3-0	Taguig Batang Global
2009	Conference II	Misamis Oriental Meteors	3-of-5	3-2	Cebu Niños
2009	Conference III	Cebu Niños	Super Leg Final	89-54	Misamis Oriental Meteors
2010	Conference IV - Tournament of the Philippines	Cebu Niños	3-of-5	3-2	Misamis Oriental Meteors
2011	Conference V	Misamis Oriental Meteors	Super Leg Final	66-60	Cebu Niños

== Teams ==
- Laguna Golden Lions
- Ilocos Sur-CS Tigers
- M' Lhullier Kwarta Padala-Cebu Niños
- Mandaue-Cebu Landmasters
- Misamis Oriental Meteors
- MP-Gensan Warriors
- Pagadian Explorers
- Manila Capitals
- Iloilo Mang Inasals
- Toyota-Bacolod Turbos
- Lipa-Batangas Barakos
- Tagaytay-Cavite Heroes
- Baguio Victory
- Zanorte Babami
- Taguig Batang Global
- Zamboanga Amores
- EKB-Apayao Rapids
- Trace-Laguna Stallions
- Smart-Pampanga Buddies
- Quezon Red Oilers
