= 2016–17 Kaohsiung Truth season =

Taiwanese professional basketball season

Kaohsiung Truth
2016–17 season
- CEO: Wesley Hsu
- Representative: James Mao
- Head Coach: Tryston Lawrence(fired); Sabatino Chen
- Arena: Kaohsiung Municipal Kaohsiung Senior High School Gymnasium
- ABL: 5-15 (.250)
- Biggest win: Truth 97–79 Dragons (January 25, 2017)
- Biggest defeat: Truth 67–95 Long Lions (December 1, 2016)
- All statistics correct as of June 18, 2022.

The 2016–17 Kaohsiung Truth season was the franchise's first and only season. They competed in the ASEAN Basketball League (ABL). The Truth were coached by Tryston Lawrence. The Truth played their home games at Kaohsiung Municipal Kaohsiung Senior High School Gymnasium.

On December 18, 2016, the Truth parted ways with Tryston Lawrence and named Sabatino Chen as their new head coach.

== Standings ==
Team	GP	W	L	PCT
Hong Kong Eastern Long Lions	20	16	4	.800
Singapore Slingers	20	13	7	.650
(Philippines) Alab Pilipinas	20	11	9	.550
(Vietnam) Saigon Heat	20	8	12	.400
Westports Malaysia Dragons	20	7	13	.350
(Chinese Taipei) Kaohsiung Truth	20	5	15	.250

== Roster ==
Note: Flags indicate national team eligibility at FIBA-sanctioned events. Players may hold other non-FIBA nationalities not displayed.

2016–17 Kaoshiung Truth roster
Players
Coaches

Pos.	No.	Nat.	Name	Ht.	Wt.	Age	From
G	0	(United States) (Chinese Taipei)	Jay Wey	6 ft 1 in (1.85 m)	180 lb (82 kg)	35 – 3 July 1990	San Francisco
F	1	(Chinese Taipei)	Ku Jen-Chieh	6 ft 9 in (2.06 m)	220 lb (100 kg)	33 – 17 September 1992	NTNU
G	2	(Chinese Taipei)	Luo Jun-Quan	5 ft 6 in (1.68 m)	145 lb (66 kg)	33 – 14 January 1992	OCU
G	3	(Chinese Taipei)	Wang Hsin-Kai	5 ft 8 in (1.73 m)	154 lb (70 kg)	42 – 1 October 1983	NTUA
G	5	(United States) (Chinese Taipei)	Sabatino Chen (injured)	6 ft 4 in (1.93 m)	185 lb (84 kg)	35 – 16 April 1990	Colorado
F/C	6	(Philippines)	Raymar Jose (AI)	6 ft 4 in (1.93 m)	210 lb (95 kg)	33 – 6 August 1992	Far Eastern
F	9	(Chinese Taipei)	Lin Zhong-Xian	6 ft 0 in (1.83 m)	176 lb (80 kg)	34 – 8 September 1991	I-Shou
G/F	13	(Chinese Taipei)	Chang Hao-Chun	6 ft 2 in (1.88 m)	165 lb (75 kg)	31 – 8 November 1993	TSU
F	17	(Philippines)	Achie Iñigo (AI)	5 ft 9 in (1.75 m)	155 lb (70 kg)	34 – 28 June 1991	Far Eastern
G	21	(Canada) (Chinese Taipei)	Carlos Andrade (C)	6 ft 8 in (2.03 m)	220 lb (100 kg)	40 – 28 November 1984	York
F	22	(Chinese Taipei)	Huang Ya-Chung	6 ft 1 in (1.85 m)	180 lb (82 kg)	44 – 16 December 1980	SCU
F	23	(United States)	Cedric Oliver (WI)	6 ft 7 in (2.01 m)	220 lb (100 kg)	39 – 15 July 1986	Radford
F/C	25	(Chinese Taipei)	Yeh Jia-Jao	6 ft 5 in (1.96 m)	200 lb (91 kg)	35 – 26 February 1990	CNU
G/F	32	(United States) (Chinese Taipei)	Wesley Hsu (C)	6 ft 3 in (1.91 m)	210 lb (95 kg)	41 – 28 January 1984	Elon
F/C	33	(United States) (Hungary)	Derek Hall (WI)	7 ft 0 in (2.13 m)	226 lb (103 kg)	35 – 5 July 1990	Albright
G/F	66	(Chinese Taipei)	Lee Wei-Min	6 ft 2 in (1.88 m)	205 lb (93 kg)	44 – 29 April 1981	NTCPE

Head coach

- (United States) Sabatino Chen

Assistant coach(es)

- (United States) Justin Stafford

Athletic trainer(s)

- (Chinese Taipei) Chen Hung-Chen

Legend

- (C) Team captain
- (WI) World import
- (AI) ASEAN heritage import
- Injured

== Game log ==
=== Exhibition game ===
November 5

Kaohsiung Truth	86–53	Kao Yuan University

Kao-Yuan High School Gymnasium, Kaohsiung City

November 9

Kaohsiung Truth	87–43	Kao-Yuan High School

Kao-Yuan High School Gymnasium, Kaohsiung City

=== Regular season ===
2015–16 game log
Total: 5–15
November : 0–1 (Home: 0–1; Road: 0–0)

Game	Date	Team	Score	High points	High rebounds	High assists	Location Attendance	Record
1	November 27	Hong Kong Eastern Long Lions	L 79-90	Hall, Hsu, Oliver (20)	Hall, Oliver (14)	Derek Hall (4)	KSHS Gymnasium	0-1

December : 0–3 (Home: 0–0; Road: 0–3)

Game	Date	Team	Score	High points	High rebounds	High assists	Location Attendance	Record
2	December 1	@Hong Kong Eastern Long Lions	L 67-95	Cedric Oliver (23)	Derek Hall (25)	Cedric Oliver (3)	Southorn Stadium	0-2
3	December 4	@Alab Pilipinas	L 82-91	Wesley Hsu (23)	Derek Hall (18)	Cedric Oliver (3)	Baliwag Star Arena	0-3
4	December 11	@Alab Pilipinas	L 87-93	Cedric Oliver (23)	Derek Hall (15)	Achie Iñigo (8)	Olivarez College Gymnasium	0-4

January : 2–2 (Home: 1–1; Road: 1–1)

Game	Date	Team	Score	High points	High rebounds	High assists	Location Attendance	Record
5	January 7	Saigon Heat	W 83-82	Cedric Oliver (25)	Cedric Oliver (13)	Cedric Oliver (4)	KSHS Gymnasium	1-4
6	January 8	Alab Pilipinas	L 77-86	Derek Hall (31)	Derek Hall (16)	Cedric Oliver (8)	KSHS Gymnasium	1-5
7	January 14	@Saigon Heat	L 85-99	Cedric Oliver (24)	Derek Hall (11)	Achie Iñigo (3)	CIS Arena	1-6
8	January 25	@Westports Malaysia Dragons	W 97-79	Wesley Hsu (23)	Cedric Oliver (16)	Cedric Oliver (10)	House of Champions, Gem-In Mall	2-6

February : 3–4 (Home: 3–1; Road: 0–3)

Game	Date	Team	Score	High points	High rebounds	High assists	Location Attendance	Record
9	February 1	Saigon Heat	W 85-71	Derek Hall (22)	Cedric Oliver (10)	Cedric Oliver (6)	KSHS Gymnasium	3-6
10	February 3	Singapore Slingers	L 66-84	Cedric Oliver (23)	Cedric Oliver (10)	Wang Hsin-Kai (3)	KSHS Gymnasium	3-7
11	February 5	Westports Malaysia Dragons	W 94-86	Cedric Oliver (24)	Derek Hall (17)	Derek Hall (5)	KSHS Gymnasium	4-7
12	February 11	@Saigon Heat	L 76-85	Cedric Oliver (22)	Cedric Oliver (16)	Cedric Oliver (4)	CIS Arena	4-8
13	February 19	Singapore Slingers	W 79-75	Derek Hall (20)	Derek Hall (13)	Derek Hall (5)	KSHS Gymnasium	5-8
14	February 22	@Hong Kong Eastern Long Lions	L 83-103	Derek Hall (20)	Cedric Oliver (4)	Derek Hall (20)	Southorn Stadium	5-9
15	February 26	@Singapore Slingers	L 76-84	Cedric Oliver (19)	Cedric Oliver (15)	Cedric Oliver (5)	OCBC Arena	5-10

March : 0–5 (Home: 0–3; Road: 0–2)

Game	Date	Team	Score	High points	High rebounds	High assists	Location Attendance	Record
16	March 5	Hong Kong Eastern Long Lions	L 75-89	Derek Hall (22)	Derek Hall (16)	Luo Jun-Quan (3)	KSHS Gymnasium	5-11
17	March 12	@Singapore Slingers	L 52-76	Derek Hall (18)	Derek Hall (11)	Jay Wey (3)	OCBC Arena	5-12
18	March 18	@Westports Malaysia Dragons	L 78-103	Raymar Jose (25)	Derek Hall (11)	Derek Hall (2)	House of Champions, Gem-In Mall	5-13
19	March 25	Westports Malaysia Dragons	L 108-114	Cedric Oliver (35)	Cedric Oliver (16)	Luo Jun-Quan (8)	KSHS Gymnasium	5-14
20	March 26	Alab Pilipinas	L 85-107	Cedric Oliver (17)	Cedric Oliver (11)	Cedric Oliver (4)	KSHS Gymnasium	5-15

== Player statistics ==
Legend
GP	Games played	MPG	Minutes per game	FG%	Field goal percentage
3P%	3-point field goal percentage	FT%	Free throw percentage	RPG	Rebounds per game
APG	Assists per game	SPG	Steals per game	BPG	Blocks per game
PPG	Points per game		Led the league

=== Regular season ===
Player	GP	MPG	PPG	2P%	3P%	FT%	RPG	APG	SPG	BPG
Mikee Reyes	1	28.0	14.0	40.0%	40.0%	0.0%	2.0	2.0	0.0	0.0
Jay Wey	15	20.1	5.3	51.1%	21.1%	66.7%	2.1	1.6	1.3	0.1
Ku Jen-Chieh	3	5.0	1.3	100.0%	0.0%	100.0%	0.7	0.0	0.0	0.3
Luo Jun-Quan	20	11.7	4.2	51.0%	40.0%	68.8%	1.0	1.4	0.3	0.0
Wang Hsin-Kai	11	16.3	6.7	46.2%	52.6%	33.3%	1.5	1.1	0.8	0.1
Sabatino Chen	Did not play									
Raymar Jose	17	21.6	10.7	52.8%	11.1%	65.1%	4.8	0.7	0.5	0.0
Lin Zhong-Xian	9	4.7	1.1	33.3%	33.3%	50.0%	0.7	0.0	0.3	0.0
Chang Hao-Chun	20	15.4	4.7	47.5%	28.3%	41.7%	1.5	0.7	0.4	0.1
Achie Iñigo	13	22.5	5.1	49.1%	5.1%	100.0%	2.0	2.8	0.9	0.0
Carlos Andrade	8	16.4	4.0	40.0%	20.0%	25.0%	1.9	0.6	0.0	0.1
Huang Ya-Chung	2	3.0	0.0	0.0%	0.0%	0.0%	0.0	0.5	0.5	0.0
Cedric Oliver	20	37.3	19.5	46.2%	32.1%	68.9%	11.4	3.6	1.4	0.7
Yeh Jia-Jao	3	1.7	0.0	0.0%	0.0%	0.0%	0.3	0.0	0.0	0.0
Wesley Hsu	20	24.1	10.4	45.1%	40.2%	80.0%	2.1	0.7	0.5	0.1
Derek Hall	18	37.2	20.1	54.7%	50.0%	78.9%	12.4	2.9	0.9	0.6
Lee Wei-Min	11	8.1	1.6	41.7%	33.3%	33.3%	1.8	0.4	0.3	0.1

- Reference：

== Transactions ==
=== Additions ===
Date	Player	Contract terms	Former team	Ref.
July 21, 2016	Sabatino Chen	—	Fubon Braves	
July 21, 2016	Carlos Andrade	—	Taiwan Mobile	
July 22, 2016	James Tyler	—	(China) Jiangsu Lions	
July 23, 2016	Cedric Oliver	—	(France) Vichy-Clermont	
July 23, 2016	Wesley Hsu	—	Taichung Pauian Archiland	
August 2, 2016	Ku Jen-Chieh	—	NTNU	
October 15, 2016	Derek Hall	—	(United Kingdom) London Lions	
November 18, 2016	Willie Miller	—	(Philippines) Pilipinas MX3 Kings	
November 18, 2016	Lee Wei-Min	—	Kinmen Kaoliang Liquor	
November 18, 2016	Chang Hao-Chun	—	TSU	
November 18, 2016	Huang Ya-Chung	—	SCU	
November 18, 2016	Luo Jun-Quan	—	OCU	
November 18, 2016	Lai Kuan-Yu	—	NTSU	
November 18, 2016	Yeh Jia-Jao	—	CNU	
November 18, 2016	Lin Zhong-Xian	—	ISU	
December 3, 2016	Mikee Reyes	one-day contract, worth unknown	(Philippines) Junior Powerade Tigers	
December 10, 2016	Raymar Jose	—	(Philippines) FEU	
December 10, 2016	Achie Iñigo	—	(Philippines) FEU	
December 18, 2016	Jay Wey	—	(United States) USF	
January 18, 2017	Wang Hsin-Kai	—	Fubon Braves	

=== Subtractions ===
Date	Player	Reason	New Team	Ref.
October 14, 2016	James Tyler	family-related matters	(Thailand) Nakhon Pathom Mad Goat	
November 28, 2016	Willie Miller	—	—	
November 28, 2016	Lai Kuan-Yu	—	—	
December 6, 2016	Mikee Reyes	contract expired	Singapore Slingers	

== Awards ==
=== Players of the Week ===
Week	Recipient	Date awarded	Ref.
	Cedric Oliver	—	
	Raymar Jose	—	
