= List of Philippine Basketball Association players (F–J) =

This is a list of players who have played or currently playing in the Philippine Basketball Association.

Denotes player who is still active in the PBA
Denotes player who has been inducted to the PBA Hall of Fame
Denotes player who has been inducted to the 40 Greatest Players in PBA History

== F ==
Nat.	Name	Pos.	Ht.	Wt.	Playing years	College/University	Ref.
(Philippines)	Bernie Fabiosa	G	5 ft 9 in (1.75 m)	160 lb (73 kg)	1975–91	San Jose	
(Philippines)	June Mar Fajardo	C	6 ft 11 in (2.11 m)	269 lb (122 kg)	2012–	Cebu	
(Philippines)	Bryan Faundo	F/C	6 ft 6 in (1.98 m)	200 lb (91 kg)	2009–22	Letran	
(Philippines)	E.J. Feihl	C	7 ft 0 in (2.13 m)	300 lb (136 kg)	1995–07	Adamson	
(Philippines)	Benedict Fernandez	G	6 ft 0 in (1.83 m)	185 lb (84 kg)	2009–10	Far Eastern	
(Philippines)	Boyet Fernandez	G	5 ft 8 in (1.73 m)	165 lb (75 kg)	1993–04	CSA–Bacolod	
(Philippines)	Ramon Fernandez	F/C	6 ft 5 in (1.96 m)	174 lb (79 kg)	1975–94	San Carlos	
(Philippines)	Kevin Ferrer	F	6 ft 4 in (1.93 m)	220 lb (100 kg)	2016–	Santo Tomas	
(Philippines)	John Ferriols	F	6 ft 4 in (1.93 m)	210 lb (95 kg)	2003–17	San Jose	
(Philippines)	Danny Florencio†	G/F	5 ft 10 in (1.78 m)	165 lb (75 kg)	1975–83	Santo Tomas	
(Philippines)	Larry Fonacier	G	6 ft 2 in (1.88 m)	170 lb (77 kg)	2005–22	Ateneo de Manila	
(Philippines) (Canada)	James Forrester	G	6 ft 2 in (1.88 m)	196 lb (89 kg)	2013–17	Arellano	
(Philippines)	Jeric Fortuna	G	5 ft 7 in (1.70 m)	170 lb (77 kg)	2013–16; 2018–19	Santo Tomas	
(Philippines)	Patrick Fran	G	6 ft 0 in (1.83 m)	175 lb (79 kg)	1996–08	Santo Tomas	

== G ==
Nat.	Name	Pos.	Ht.	Wt.	Playing years	College/University	Ref.
(Philippines)	Hesed Gabo	G	5 ft 9 in (1.75 m)	No information	2023	Mapúa	
(Philippines)	Jerwin Gaco	F	6 ft 4 in (1.93 m)	180 lb (82 kg)	2010–16	Polytechnic; De La Salle	
(Philippines)	Bryan Gahol†	F	6 ft 4 in (1.93 m)	210 lb (95 kg)	1999–06	UP Diliman	
(Philippines)	Bong Galanza	G	6 ft 2 in (1.88 m)	185 lb (84 kg)	2016–22	East	
(Philippines)	Jorge Gallent	F	6 ft 2 in (1.88 m)	No information	1995–99	Far Eastern	
(Philippines)	Riego Gamalinda	G	6 ft 3 in (1.91 m)	184 lb (83 kg)	2010–21	San Beda	
(Philippines) (United States)	Brandon Ganuelas-Rosser	F/C	6 ft 6 in (1.98 m)	220 lb (100 kg)	2022–	Central Arizona; UC Riverside	
(Philippines) (United States)	Matt Ganuelas-Rosser	G	6 ft 5 in (1.96 m)	190 lb (86 kg)	2014–24	Cal Poly Pomona	
(Philippines)	RR Garcia	G	5 ft 11 in (1.80 m)	160 lb (73 kg)	2013–	Far Eastern	
(Philippines)	Fritz Gaston	G	6 ft 1 in (1.85 m)	175 lb (79 kg)	1979–86	Ateneo de Manila	
(Philippines)	Jayvee Gayoso	G/F	6 ft 2 in (1.88 m)	190 lb (86 kg)	1991–01	Ateneo de Manila	
(Philippines)	Niño Gelig	G/F	6 ft 2 in (1.88 m)	170 lb (77 kg)	2004–12	Santo Tomas	
(Philippines)	Isaac Go	C/F	6 ft 7 in (2.01 m)	230 lb (104 kg)	2021–	Ateneo de Manila	
(Philippines)	Frank Golla	F/C	6 ft 4 in (1.93 m)	230 lb (104 kg)	2014–21	Ateneo de Manila	
(Philippines)	Egay Gomez	F/C	6 ft 2 in (1.88 m)	180 lb (82 kg)	1975–77	Jose Rizal	
(Philippines) (Spain)	Javi Gómez de Liaño	F	6 ft 3 in (1.91 m)	193 lb (88 kg)	2022–24	UP Diliman	
(Philippines)	Norman Gonzales	F	6 ft 4 in (1.93 m)	200 lb (91 kg)	2001–13	San Beda	
(Philippines)	Wesley Gonzales	G/F	6 ft 4 in (1.93 m)	180 lb (82 kg)	2004–14	Ateneo de Manila	
(Philippines)	Dante Gonzalgo	F	6 ft 2 in (1.88 m)	185 lb (84 kg)	1984–93	LPU–Manila	
(Philippines)	Alfonzo Gotladera	C	6 ft 5 in (1.96 m)	240 lb (109 kg)	2016–18; 2021	De La Salle; Ateneo de Manila	
(Philippines) (United States)	Jeremiah Gray	G/F	6 ft 5 in (1.96 m)	205 lb (93 kg)	2022–	Moorpark; Dominican (CA)	
(Philippines)	Jonathan Grey	G/F	6 ft 3 in (1.91 m)	190 lb (86 kg)	2016–24	Benilde	
(Philippines)	Rey Guevarra	F	6 ft 4 in (1.93 m)	175 lb (79 kg)	2010–19	Letran	
(Philippines)	Abet Guidaben	F/C	6 ft 5 in (1.96 m)	192 lb (87 kg)	1975–95	San Jose	
(Philippines) (Australia)	Bradwyn Guinto	F/C	6 ft 6 in (1.98 m)	220 lb (100 kg)	2015–	San Sebastian	

== H ==
Nat.	Name	Pos.	Ht.	Wt.	Playing years	College/University	Ref.
(Philippines) (United States)	Davonn Harp	F	6 ft 7 in (2.01 m)	225 lb (102 kg)	2000–05	Allegany; Towson; Kutztown	
(Philippines) (United States)	Rudy Hatfield	F	6 ft 4 in (1.93 m)	200 lb (91 kg)	2000–07; 2010–13	UM Dearborn	
(Philippines)	Bong Hawkins	F	6 ft 3 in (1.91 m)	220 lb (100 kg)	1991–01; 2003–06	Perpetual	
(Philippines)	Marvin Hayes	F	6 ft 2 in (1.88 m)	190 lb (86 kg)	2010–17; 2021	Jose Rizal	
(Philippines) (United States)	Jayjay Helterbrand	G	6 ft 0 in (1.83 m)	180 lb (82 kg)	2000–17	Kentucky State	
(Philippines) (United States)	Robbie Herndon	G	6 ft 3 in (1.91 m)	180 lb (82 kg)	2017–	San Francisco State	
(Philippines)	Borgie Hermida	G	5 ft 10 in (1.78 m)	160 lb (73 kg)	2010–12	San Beda	
(Philippines) (United States)	Brian Heruela	G	5 ft 11 in (1.80 m)	195 lb (88 kg)	2014–	Cebu	
(Philippines) (United States)	Vince Hizon	G	6 ft 2 in (1.88 m)	180 lb (82 kg)	1994–98; 2001–04	Cypress; Boise State; Biola; Ateneo de Manila	
(Philippines) (United States)	Cliff Hodge	F	6 ft 5 in (1.96 m)	185 lb (84 kg)	2012–	Reedley	
(Philippines) (United States)	Michael Holper	F/C	6 ft 6 in (1.98 m)	210 lb (95 kg)	2005–10	San Diego State	
(Philippines) (United States)	Isaac Holstein	C	6 ft 9 in (2.06 m)	206 lb (93 kg)	2013–15	WV State	
(Philippines) (United States)	Stephen Holt	G	6 ft 4 in (1.93 m)	195 lb (88 kg)	2023–	Saint Mary's	
(Philippines)	Dondon Hontiveros	G/F	6 ft 2 in (1.88 m)	175 lb (79 kg)	2000–18	Cebu	
(Philippines)	Emmanuel Hoque	G/F	6 ft 3 in (1.91 m)	190 lb (86 kg)	2000–04	Laguna	
(Philippines) (Turkey)	Mike Hrabak	F	6 ft 7 in (2.01 m)	220 lb (100 kg)	2001–10	Central Arizona	
(Philippines)	Freddie Hubalde	F	6 ft 1 in (1.85 m)	175 lb (79 kg)	1975–90	Mapúa	
(Philippines)	Paulo Hubalde	G	5 ft 11 in (1.80 m)	165 lb (75 kg)	2005–17	East	
(Philippines)	Reynel Hugnatan	F	6 ft 5 in (1.96 m)	200 lb (91 kg)	2003–23	Manila	

== I ==
Nat.	Name	Pos.	Ht.	Wt.	Playing years	College/University	Ref.
(Philippines)	Jireh Ibañes	G	6 ft 2 in (1.88 m)	168 lb (76 kg)	2006–17	UP Diliman	
(Philippines) (Nigeria)	Kenneth Ighalo	F	6 ft 2 in (1.88 m)	175 lb (79 kg)	2014–24	Mapúa	
(Philippines)	Brian Ilad	F/C	6 ft 5 in (1.96 m)	190 lb (86 kg)	2011–12	De La Salle	
(Philippines)	RK Ilagan	G	5 ft 7 in (1.70 m)	150 lb (68 kg)	2021–	San Sebastian	
(Philippines)	Danny Ildefonso	C	6 ft 6 in (1.98 m)	210 lb (95 kg)	1998–15	National	
(Philippines)	JC Intal	F	6 ft 4 in (1.93 m)	185 lb (84 kg)	2007–20	Ateneo de Manila	
(Philippines)	Leo Isaac	G/F	6 ft 1 in (1.85 m)	172 lb (78 kg)	1986–95	Mapúa	
(Philippines)	Mark Isip	F	6 ft 4 in (1.93 m)	210 lb (95 kg)	2006–16	Far Eastern	
(Philippines)	Padim Israel	G/F	6 ft 3 in (1.91 m)	160 lb (73 kg)	1981–92	Ateneo de Manila	

== J ==
Nat.	Name	Pos.	Ht.	Wt.	Playing years	College/University	Ref.
(Philippines) (United States)	Trevis Jackson	G	5 ft 11 in (1.80 m)	170 lb (77 kg)	2019–22	Sac State	
(Philippines)	Chito Jaime	F	6 ft 4 in (1.93 m)	200 lb (91 kg)	2008–19	AMA	
(Philippines)	Jio Jalalon	G	5 ft 9 in (1.75 m)	150 lb (68 kg)	2016–	Arellano	
(Philippines)	Jammer Jamito	F	6 ft 5 in (1.96 m)	170 lb (77 kg)	2016–22	St. Claire	
(Philippines)	Pido Jarencio	G	5 ft 10 in (1.78 m)	170 lb (77 kg)	1986–01	Santo Tomas	
(Philippines)	Chris Javier	F	6 ft 5 in (1.96 m)	200 lb (91 kg)	2016–22	East	
(Philippines)	Robert Jaworski	G	6 ft 0 in (1.83 m)	180 lb (82 kg)	1975–98	East	
(Philippines)	Robert Jaworski Jr.	G/F	6 ft 2 in (1.88 m)	180 lb (82 kg)	1995–98	Ateneo de Manila	
(Philippines)	RJ Jazul	G	5 ft 11 in (1.80 m)	170 lb (77 kg)	2010–	Letran	
(Philippines) (United States)	Keith Jensen	F	6 ft 4 in (1.93 m)	212 lb (96 kg)	2012–16	NYU	
(Philippines)	Kyt Jimenez	G	5 ft 11 in (1.80 m)	No information	2023–	Far Eastern; Perpetual	
(Philippines)	Bobby Jose	F/C	6 ft 4 in (1.93 m)	192 lb (87 kg)	1989–05	Santo Tomas	
(Philippines)	Mon Jose	G	6 ft 1 in (1.85 m)	No information	1997–00	De La Salle	
(Philippines)	Raymar Jose	F	6 ft 4 in (1.93 m)	200 lb (91 kg)	2017–	Far Eastern	
(Philippines)	Michael Juico	G	6 ft 0 in (1.83 m)	140 lb (64 kg)	2017–18	Olivarez; San Sebastian	
(Philippines)	Poch Juinio	C	6 ft 5 in (1.96 m)	215 lb (98 kg)	1994–08	UP Diliman	
(Philippines)	Reed Juntilla	G	6 ft 2 in (1.88 m)	180 lb (82 kg)	2008–13	Visayas	

== More PBA player lists ==
A–E | F–J | K–O | P–T | U–Z
