= Kaohsiung Truth =

- League: ASEAN Basketball League (2016–2017)
- Founded: 2016
- Folded: 2017
- History: Kaohsiung Truth (2016–2017)
- Arena: Kaohsiung Municipal Kaohsiung Senior High School Gymnasium
- Location: Kaohsiung, Taiwan
- Team colours: Blue, Black, Gold
- Championships: 0
- Website: http://kaohsiungtruth.org/

The Kaohsiung Truth were a professional basketball team based in Kaohsiung, Taiwan. The Truth played one season in the ASEAN Basketball League.

== History ==
Kaohsiung Truth was founded in 2016 as the first professional basketball team to play in Kaohsiung City. They were officially announced as a member of the ASEAN Basketball League on July 17, 2016. The Truth are the league's first Christian ministry team. They played in the 2016-17 season but was disbanded after the end of the season. The Formosa Dreamers replaced them as the sole Taiwanese team in the ABL in the 2017-18 season.

== Home arena ==
The Truth played their home games at the Kaohsiung Municipal Kaohsiung Senior High School Gym.

== Former players ==
- (Philippines) Mikee Reyes (2016–2017)
- (United States) (Chinese Taipei) Sabatino Chen (2016-2017)
- (United States) (Chinese Taipei) Jay Wey (2016-2017)
- (Chinese Taipei) Ku Jen-Chieh (2016-2017)
- (Chinese Taipei) Luo Jun-Quan (2016-2017)
- (Chinese Taipei) Wang Hsin-Kai (2016-2017)
- (Philippines) Raymar Jose (2016-2017)
- (Chinese Taipei) Lin Zhong-Xian (2016-2017)
- (Chinese Taipei) Chang Hao-Chun (2016-2017)
- (Philippines) Achie Inigo (2016-2017)
- (Chinese Taipei) (Canada) Carlos Andrade (2016-2017)
- (Chinese Taipei) Huang Ya-Chung (2016-2017)
- (United States) Chris Oliver (2016-2017)
- (Chinese Taipei) Yeh Jia-Hao (2016-2017)
- (Chinese Taipei) (United States) Wesley Hsu (2016-2017)
- (United States) (Hungary) Derek Hall (2016-2017)
- (Chinese Taipei) Lee Wei-Min (2016-2017)

== Head coaches ==
Nat.	Name	Tenure	Totals				Regular season				Playoffs			
Nat.	Name	Tenure	G	W	L	PCT	G	W	L	PCT	G	W	L	PCT
(United States)	Tryston Lawrence	2016–2017	4	0	4	.000	4	0	4	.000	0	0	0	–
(United States) (Chinese Taipei)	Sabatino Chen	2016–2017	16	5	11	.313	16	5	11	.313	0	0	0	–
Totals			20	5	15	.250	20	5	15	.250	0	0	0	–

== Season-by-season record ==
ASEAN Basketball League
Season	Coach	Regular season				Postseason			
Season	Coach	Won	Lost	Win %	Finish	Won	Lost	Win %	Result
2016–17	Tryston Lawrence	5	15	.250	6th	Did not qualify			
2016–17	Sabatino Chen	5	15	.250	6th	Did not qualify			
Totals		5	15	.250	-	0	0	–	0 Playoff Appearances
