= List of Philippine Basketball Association players (A–E) =

This is a list of players who have played or currently playing in the Philippine Basketball Association.

Denotes player who is still active in the PBA
Denotes player who has been inducted to the PBA Hall of Fame.
Denotes player who has been inducted to the 40 Greatest Players in PBA History

== A ==
Nat.	Name	Pos.	Ht.	Wt.	Playing years	College/University	Ref.
(Philippines)	Dylan Ababou	F	6 ft 3 in (1.91 m)	193 lb (88 kg)	2011–18	Santo Tomas	
(Philippines)	Aaron Aban	G/F	6 ft 3 in (1.91 m)	200 lb (91 kg)	2006–17	Letran	
(Philippines)	Gee Abanilla	G	No information	No information	1993	De La Salle	
(Philippines)	Johnny Abarrientos	G	5 ft 8 in (1.73 m)	150 lb (68 kg)	1993–07; 2010	Far Eastern	
(Philippines)	RJ Abarrientos	G	5 ft 11 in (1.80 m)	174 lb (79 kg)	2024–	Far Eastern	
(Philippines)	Freddie Abuda	F/C	6 ft 4 in (1.93 m)	200 lb (91 kg)	1993–04	Cebu	
(Philippines)	Calvin Abueva	F	6 ft 3 in (1.91 m)	185 lb (84 kg)	2012–	San Sebastian	
(Philippines)	Alvin Abundo	G	5 ft 8 in (1.73 m)	150 lb (68 kg)	2016–22	Centro	
(Philippines)	Fort Acuña†	F/C	6 ft 1 in (1.85 m)	185 lb (84 kg)	1975–78	UP Diliman	
(Philippines)	Val Acuña	G/F	6 ft 3 in (1.91 m)	179 lb (81 kg)	2010–15; 2021–22	East	
(Philippines) (United States)	Roosevelt Adams	G/F	6 ft 5 in (1.96 m)	190 lb (86 kg)	2019–21	C of I	
(Philippines)	Rommel Adducul	C	6 ft 7 in (2.01 m)	220 lb (100 kg)	2003–13	San Sebastian	
(Philippines)	Bogs Adornado	F	6 ft 1 in (1.85 m)	175 lb (79 kg)	1975–87	Santo Tomas	
(Philippines)	Francis Adriano	G/F	6 ft 1 in (1.85 m)	170 lb (77 kg)	2001–08	Far Eastern	
(Philippines)	Oliver Agapito	F/C	6 ft 6 in (1.98 m)	210 lb (95 kg)	2001–05	De La Salle; Benilde	
(Philippines)	Keith Agovida	G/F	6 ft 2 in (1.88 m)	170 lb (77 kg)	2015–20	Arellano	
(Philippines)	Japeth Aguilar	C	6 ft 10 in (2.08 m)	210 lb (95 kg)	2009–	Ateneo de Manila; Western Kentucky	
(Philippines)	Ato Agustin	G	5 ft 11 in (1.80 m)	165 lb (75 kg)	1989–01	Lyceum	
(Philippines) (Nigeria) (United States)	Jerrick Ahanmisi	G	6 ft 1 in (1.85 m)	185 lb (84 kg)	2021–	Adamson	
(Philippines) (United States) (Nigeria)	Maverick Ahanmisi	G	6 ft 2 in (1.88 m)	185 lb (84 kg)	2015–	Minnesota	
(Philippines)	Rabeh Al-Hussaini	C	6 ft 7 in (2.01 m)	230 lb (104 kg)	2010–14; 2015–19	Ateneo de Manila	
(Philippines) (United States)	Jimmy Alapag	G	5 ft 10 in (1.78 m)	165 lb (75 kg)	2003–16	Cal State San Bernardino	
(Philippines)	Kevin Alas	G	6 ft 0 in (1.83 m)	175 lb (79 kg)	2014–	Letran	
(Philippines)	Dino Aldeguer	G	5 ft 10 in (1.78 m)	No information	2000	De La Salle	
(Philippines)	Teddy Alfarero†	C	6 ft 4 in (1.93 m)	185 lb (84 kg)	1985–87	Visayas; De La Salle	
(Philippines)	Yousif Aljamal	F	6 ft 4 in (1.93 m)	205 lb (93 kg)	2007–13	San Beda	
(Philippines)	Don Allado	F/C	6 ft 6 in (1.98 m)	220 lb (100 kg)	1999–15	De La Salle	
(Philippines)	Francis Allera	F	6 ft 5 in (1.96 m)	180 lb (82 kg)	2009–12	Santo Tomas	
(Philippines)	Alfie Almario†	F	6 ft 2 in (1.88 m)	200 lb (91 kg)	1986–90	De La Salle	
(Philippines)	Raymond Almazan	C	6 ft 8 in (2.03 m)	200 lb (91 kg)	2013–	Letran	
(Philippines)	Gelo Alolino	G	6 ft 0 in (1.83 m)	185 lb (84 kg)	2016–24	National	
(Philippines)	Chad Alonzo	F	6 ft 4 in (1.93 m)	209 lb (95 kg)	2008–15	Adamson	
(Philippines)	Eric Altamirano	G	5 ft 10 in (1.78 m)	160 lb (73 kg)	1989–1995	UP Diliman	
(Philippines)	Lester Alvarez	G	5 ft 9 in (1.75 m)	145 lb (66 kg)	2012–15	Adamson	
(Philippines)	Paul Alvarez	G/F	6 ft 1 in (1.85 m)	180 lb (82 kg)	1989–2005	San Sebastian	
(Philippines) (Japan)	Rich Alvarez	F	6 ft 4 in (1.93 m)	200 lb (91 kg)	2004–16	Ateneo de Manila	
(Philippines)	Baser Amer	G	5 ft 10 in (1.78 m)	170 lb (77 kg)	2015–	San Beda	
(Philippines)	Dondon Ampalayo	F	6 ft 3 in (1.91 m)	176 lb (80 kg)	1986–95	San Jose	
(Philippines)	Mark Andaya	C	6 ft 8 in (2.03 m)	210 lb (95 kg)	2006–12	Letran	
(Philippines) (Canada)	Sean Anthony	F	6 ft 4 in (1.93 m)	200 lb (91 kg)	2010–	McGill	
(Philippines) (United States)	William Antonio	G/F	6 ft 4 in (1.93 m)	205 lb (93 kg)	1998–13	Chaminade	
(Philippines)	Jeckster Apinan	F	6 ft 5 in (1.96 m)	190 lb (86 kg)	2014–17	Jose Rizal	
(Philippines)	Jimbo Aquino	G	6 ft 2 in (1.88 m)	160 lb (73 kg)	2010–14	San Sebastian	
(Philippines)	Marlou Aquino	C	6 ft 9 in (2.06 m)	215 lb (98 kg)	1996–11	Adamson	
(Philippines)	Justin Arana	C	6 ft 7 in (2.01 m)	231 lb (105 kg)	2022–	Santo Tomas; Arellano	
(Philippines)	Ryan Araña	G	6 ft 2 in (1.88 m)	180 lb (82 kg)	2007–20	De La Salle	
(Philippines)	Ford Arao	C	6 ft 6 in (1.98 m)	200 lb (91 kg)	2010	Ateneo de Manila	
(Philippines)	Harold Arboleda	G	6 ft 2 in (1.88 m)	180 lb (82 kg)	2014–16	Perpetual	
(Philippines)	Wynne Arboleda	G	5 ft 11 in (1.80 m)	185 lb (84 kg)	2000–16	MLQU	
(Philippines)	Marcy Arellano	G	5 ft 11 in (1.80 m)	175 lb (79 kg)	2009–11	East	
(Philippines) (United States)	John Arigo	G/F	6 ft 5 in (1.96 m)	170 lb (77 kg)	2001–09	North Florida; Tampa	
(Philippines)	Francis Arnaiz	G	5 ft 10 in (1.78 m)	160 lb (73 kg)	1975–86	Ateneo de Manila	
(Philippines)	Paul Artadi	G	5 ft 10 in (1.78 m)	150 lb (68 kg)	2004–15	East	
(Philippines)	Nelson Asaytono	F	6 ft 3 in (1.91 m)	220 lb (100 kg)	1989–06	Manila	
(Philippines)	Anton Asistio	G	5 ft 11 in (1.80 m)	175 lb (79 kg)	2021–	Ateneo de Manila	
(Philippines)	Simon Atkins	G	5 ft 10 in (1.78 m)	176 lb (80 kg)	2012–18	De La Salle	
(Philippines)	Leo Austria	G	5 ft 10 in (1.78 m)	159 lb (72 kg)	1985–93	LPU–Manila	
(Philippines)	Mike Ayonayon	G	6 ft 0 in (1.83 m)	170 lb (77 kg)	2021–	PCU	

== B ==
Nat.	Name	Pos.	Ht.	Wt.	Playing years	College/University	Ref.
(Philippines)	Gido Babilonia†	C	6 ft 6 in (1.98 m)	228 lb (103 kg)	1990–02	Santo Tomas	
(Philippines)	Dickie Bachmann	C	6 ft 5 in (1.96 m)	300 lb (136 kg)	1993–99	De La Salle	
(Philippines)	Nonoy Baclao	F	6 ft 6 in (1.98 m)	210 lb (95 kg)	2010–24	West Negros; Ateneo de Manila	
(Philippines) (United States)	Hyram Bagatsing	G	6 ft 1 in (1.85 m)	190 lb (86 kg)	2011–16	De La Salle	
(Philippines)	Cyrus Baguio	G	6 ft 1 in (1.85 m)	170 lb (77 kg)	2003–19	Santo Tomas	
(Philippines)	Froilan Baguion	G	5 ft 8 in (1.73 m)	150 lb (68 kg)	2006–09	National	
(Philippines)	Rensy Bajar	G	5 ft 10 in (1.78 m)	155 lb (70 kg)	2002–07	San Beda	
(Philippines)	Christian Balagasay	C	6 ft 5 in (1.96 m)	215 lb (98 kg)	2020–23	Letran	
(Philippines)	Bonel Balingit	C	6 ft 9 in (2.06 m)	300 lb (136 kg)	1992–98; 2001–02	Visayas	
(Philippines)	Estong Ballesteros	F	6 ft 4 in (1.93 m)	210 lb (95 kg)	1997–08	Santo Tomas	
(Philippines)	Jason Ballesteros	C	6 ft 7 in (2.01 m)	200 lb (91 kg)	2011–20	San Sebastian	
(Philippines)	Juneric Baloria	G	5 ft 11 in (1.80 m)	165 lb (75 kg)	2014–16	Perpetual	
(Philippines)	Justine Baltazar	C	6 ft 9 in (2.06 m)	250 lb (113 kg)	2024–	De La Salle	
(Philippines)	Gab Banal	F	6 ft 3 in (1.91 m)	200 lb (91 kg)	2015–24	Mapúa	
(Philippines)	Joel Banal	G/F	6 ft 4 in (1.93 m)	No information	1982–85	Mapúa	
(Philippines) (United States) (Italy)	Chris Banchero	G	6 ft 1 in (1.85 m)	185 lb (84 kg)	2012–	Seattle Pacific	
(Philippines)	Mac Baracael	F	6 ft 4 in (1.93 m)	190 lb (86 kg)	2011–18	Far Eastern	
(Philippines)	Sedrick Barefield	G	6 ft 2 in (1.88 m)	190 lb (86 kg)	2024–	SMU; Utah	
(Philippines)	Mark Barroca	G	5 ft 10 in (1.78 m)	170 lb (77 kg)70	2011–	Far Eastern	
(Philippines) (Australia)	Brandon Bates	C	6 ft 9 in (2.06 m)	231 lb (105 kg)	2023–	De La Salle	
(Philippines)	Boyet Bautista	G	5 ft 7 in (1.70 m)	160 lb (73 kg)	2006–07	Letran	
(Philippines)	Orlando Bauzon†	G	6 ft 1 in (1.85 m)	180 lb (82 kg)	1975–78	Santo Tomas	
(Philippines)	Donbel Belano	G	5 ft 10 in (1.78 m)	178 lb (81 kg)	1999–2010	Visayas	
(Philippines) (United States)	Nic Belasco	F/C	6 ft 6 in (1.98 m)	210 lb (95 kg)	1997–10	Notre Dame	
(Philippines)	Beau Belga	C	6 ft 4 in (1.93 m)	225 lb (102 kg)	2008–	PCU	
(Philippines)	Udoy Belmonte	G	5 ft 11 in (1.80 m)	185 lb (84 kg)	1994–95	Santo Tomas	
(Philippines)	Mac Belo	F	6 ft 4 in (1.93 m)	185 lb (84 kg)	2016–24	Far Eastern	
(Philippines)	Egay Billones	G	5 ft 10 in (1.78 m)	185 lb (84 kg)	2002–10	Las Piñas	
(Philippines) (United States)	Aaron Black	G	6 ft 1 in (1.85 m)	180 lb (82 kg)	2019–	Ateneo de Manila	
(Philippines)	Cris Bolado†	C	6 ft 6 in (1.98 m)	260 lb (118 kg)	1994–03	National	
(Philippines)	Robert Bolick	G	6 ft 1 in (1.85 m)	178 lb (81 kg)	2019–	De La Salle; San Beda	
(Philippines)	Ken Bono	F/C	6 ft 6 in (1.98 m)	230 lb (104 kg)	2007–19; 2022–24	Adamson	
(Philippines)	Mark Borboran	F	6 ft 4 in (1.93 m)	197 lb (89 kg)	2008–	Jose Rizal; East	
(Philippines)	Anthony Bringas	F	6 ft 3 in (1.91 m)	221 lb (100 kg)	2013–14	Far Eastern	
(Philippines)	Rodney Brondial	F	6 ft 5 in (1.96 m)	210 lb (95 kg)	2014–	Adamson	
(Philippines) (United States)	Ricky Brown	G	6 ft 0 in (1.83 m)	178 lb (81 kg)	1980–90	Centenary; Yavapai; Pepperdine; De La Salle	
(Philippines)	Ronjay Buenafe	G	6 ft 1 in (1.85 m)	190 lb (86 kg)	2007–18	EAC	
(Philippines)	Ryan Buenafe	G	6 ft 2 in (1.88 m)	220 lb (100 kg)	2013–17	Ateneo de Manila	
(Philippines) (United States)	JR Buensuceso	G	5 ft 10 in (1.78 m)	165 lb (75 kg)	2013–15	BYU Hawaii	
(Philippines)	Paolo Bugia	F/C	6 ft 6 in (1.98 m)	210 lb (95 kg)	2005–15	Ateneo de Manila	
(Philippines)	Gilbert Bulawan†	F	6 ft 4 in (1.93 m)	195 lb (88 kg)	2011–16	San Sebastian	
(Philippines) (Switzerland)	Michael Burtscher	F	6 ft 6 in (1.98 m)	224 lb (102 kg)	2009–15	Clearwater	
(Philippines)	Philip Butel	C	6 ft 7 in (2.01 m)	190 lb (86 kg)	2007–08	East	

== C ==
Nat.	Name	Pos.	Ht.	Wt.	Playing years	College/University	Ref.
(Philippines)	Alex Cabagnot	G	6 ft 0 in (1.83 m)	180 lb (82 kg)	2005–23; 2024–	Los Angeles Valley; UH Hilo	
(Philippines)	Boy Cabahug	G/F	5 ft 11 in (1.80 m)	165 lb (75 kg)	1989–98	Visayas	
(Philippines)	Junjun Cabatu	F	6 ft 5 in (1.96 m)	215 lb (98 kg)	2006–09	De La Salle	
(Philippines)	Sonny Cabatu	C	6 ft 5 in (1.96 m)	205 lb (93 kg)	1985–95	UNP; PSBA	
(Philippines) (United States)	Brandon Cablay	G	6 ft 0 in (1.83 m)	180 lb (82 kg)	2003–12	Vanguard	
(Philippines)	M.C. Caceres	F	6 ft 4 in (1.93 m)	205 lb (93 kg)	2006–09	PSBA	
(Philippines)	Mark Caguioa	G	6 ft 1 in (1.85 m)	185 lb (84 kg)	2001–20	Glendale	
(Philippines)	Allan Caidic	G/F	6 ft 2 in (1.88 m)	192 lb (87 kg)	1987–99	East	
(Philippines)	Chris Calaguio	G	6 ft 2 in (1.88 m)	180 lb (82 kg)	1999–10	Letran	
(Philippines)	Ricky Calimag	F	6 ft 4 in (1.93 m)	218 lb (99 kg)	2001–12	San Beda	
(Philippines)	Michael Calisaan	F	6 ft 4 in (1.93 m)	No information	2019–21	San Sebastian	
(Philippines)	Hector Calma	G	5 ft 8 in (1.73 m)	155 lb (70 kg)	1986–94	Adamson	
(Philippines)	Simon Camacho	F	6 ft 5 in (1.96 m)	No information	2021–	Adamson	
(Philippines)	Don Camaso	F	6 ft 8 in (2.03 m)	200 lb (91 kg)	2000–08	MMC	
(Philippines)	Eric Camson	F	6 ft 4 in (1.93 m)	228 lb (103 kg)	2013–24	Adamson	
(Philippines)	KG Canaleta	F	6 ft 6 in (1.98 m)	190 lb (86 kg)	2005–21	East	
(Philippines)	Mark Canlas	F	6 ft 5 in (1.96 m)	200 lb (91 kg)	2011–12	Santo Tomas	
(Philippines)	CJ Cansino	G	6 ft 2 in (1.88 m)	No information	2024–	Santo Tomas; UP Diliman	
(Philippines)	Chris Cantonjos	F/C	6 ft 6 in (1.98 m)	197 lb (89 kg)	1999–02	Santo Tomas	
(Philippines)	Ely Capacio†	F/C	6 ft 4 in (1.93 m)	No information	1979–86	No information	
(Philippines)	Glenn Capacio	G/F	6 ft 1 in (1.85 m)	185 lb (84 kg)	1988–01	Far Eastern	
(Philippines)	Prince Caperal	F/C	6 ft 7 in (2.01 m)	230 lb (104 kg)	2014–24	Arellano	
(Philippines)	Anjo Caram	G	5 ft 8 in (1.73 m)	150 lb (68 kg)	2013–	San Beda	
(Philippines)	Johnedel Cardel	G	6 ft 1 in (1.85 m)	180 lb (82 kg)	1993–01	De La Salle	
(Philippines)	Mark Cardona	G	6 ft 1 in (1.85 m)	175 lb (79 kg)	2005–16; 2017; 2021	De La Salle	
(Philippines) (United States)	Harvey Carey	F	6 ft 4 in (1.93 m)	225 lb (102 kg)	2003–20	Sonoma State	
(Philippines) (United States)	Jeffrey Cariaso	G/F	6 ft 2 in (1.88 m)	190 lb (86 kg)	1995–10	Sonoma State	
(Philippines)	Kemark Cariño	F/C	6 ft 9 in (2.06 m)	203 lb (92 kg)	2023–	San Beda	
(Philippines)	Bernardo Carpio	F	6 ft 3 in (1.91 m)	188 lb (85 kg)	1980–92	Ateneo de Manila	
(Philippines)	JVee Casio	G	5 ft 10 in (1.78 m)	175 lb (79 kg)	2011–	De La Salle	
(Philippines) (United States)	Noy Castillo	G	6 ft 0 in (1.83 m)	185 lb (84 kg)	1998–08	The Citadel	
(Philippines)	Jayson Castro	G	5 ft 10 in (1.78 m)	185 lb (84 kg)	2008–	PCU	
(Philippines)	Cesar Catli	G/F	6 ft 3 in (1.91 m)	185 lb (84 kg)	2005–10	Far Eastern	
(Philippines)	JR Cawaling	F	6 ft 3 in (1.91 m)	190 lb (86 kg)	2013–14; 2015; 2021	Far Eastern	
(Philippines)	Reden Celda	G	6 ft 0 in (1.83 m)	165 lb (75 kg)	2016–23	National	
(Philippines)	Robby Celiz	F	6 ft 4 in (1.93 m)	217 lb (98 kg)	2013–15; 2017	National	
(Philippines)	Reil Cervantes	F	6 ft 4 in (1.93 m)	210 lb (95 kg)	2011–17	Far Eastern	
(Philippines)	Philip Cezar	F/C	6 ft 3 in (1.91 m)	170 lb (77 kg)	1975–91	Jose Rizal	
(Philippines)	Jeff Chan	G/F	6 ft 2 in (1.88 m)	185 lb (84 kg)	2008–24	Far Eastern	
(Philippines)	Gec Chia	G	6 ft 1 in (1.85 m)	180 lb (82 kg)	2003–2011	Ateneo de Manila	
(Philippines)	Gian Chiu	C	6 ft 9 in (2.06 m)	225 lb (102 kg)	2013–14	Oberlin	
(Philippines)	Justin Chua	C	6 ft 5 in (1.96 m)	232 lb (105 kg)	2013–	Ateneo de Manila	
(Philippines)	Jhonard Clarito	G/F	6 ft 2 in (1.88 m)	187 lb (85 kg)	2022–	De Ocampo	
(Philippines)	Ricardo Cleofas	F	5 ft 11 in (1.80 m)	170 lb (77 kg)	No information	Ateneo de Manila	
(Philippines)	Atoy Co	G	6 ft 1.5 in (1.87 m)	168 lb (76 kg)	1975–88	Mapúa	
(Philippines)	Jerry Codiñera	F/C	6 ft 6 in (1.98 m)	245 lb (111 kg)	1988–05	East	
(Philippines)	Roberto Concepcion†	F	6 ft 1 in (1.85 m)	142 lb (64 kg)	No information	Santo Tomas	
(Philippines)	Christian Coronel	G	5 ft 8 in (1.73 m)	160 lb (73 kg)	2007–10	San Sebastian	
(Philippines)	Jackson Corpuz	F	6 ft 4 in (1.93 m)	180 lb (82 kg)	2017–24	PCU	
(Philippines) (United States)	Mike Cortez	G	6 ft 0 in (1.83 m)	170 lb (77 kg)	2003–19	De La Salle	
(Philippines)	Miguel Corteza	F	6 ft 4 in (1.93 m)	No information	2024–	De La Salle; Benilde	
(Philippines) (United States)	Alex Crisano	F/C	6 ft 8 in (2.03 m)	240 lb (109 kg)	2000–10; 2011–12	Brooklyn	
(Philippines)	Carl Bryan Cruz	F	6 ft 4 in (1.93 m)	179 lb (81 kg)	2016–24	Far Eastern	
(Philippines)	Celino Cruz	G	5 ft 9 in (1.75 m)	170 lb (77 kg)	2004–12	Far Eastern	
(Philippines) (Guam) (Northern Mariana Islands)	Jericho Cruz	G	6 ft 1 in (1.85 m)	190 lb (86 kg)	2014–	RTU; Adamson	
(Philippines)	Jervy Cruz	F/C	6 ft 4 in (1.93 m)	220 lb (100 kg)	2009–22	Santo Tomas	
(Philippines)	Mark Cruz	G	5 ft 5 in (1.65 m)	150 lb (68 kg)	2015–18	Letran	
(Philippines)	Marvin Cruz	G	5 ft 8 in (1.73 m)	160 lb (73 kg)	2007–13	UP Diliman	
(Philippines)	Mac Cuan	G	5 ft 11 in (1.80 m)	No information	2004–06	De La Salle	
(Philippines)	Rey Cuenco†	F/C	6 ft 4 in (1.93 m)	175 lb (79 kg)	1986–95	Gregorio Araneta	
(Philippines)	Gabby Cui	F/C	6 ft 4 in (1.93 m)	210 lb (95 kg)	1997–02	Ateneo de Manila	
(Philippines)	Bonbon Custodio	G	5 ft 11 in (1.80 m)	170 lb (77 kg)	2008–15	East	

== D ==
Nat.	Name	Pos.	Ht.	Wt.	Playing years	College/University	Ref.
(Philippines)	Dennis Daa	F/C	6 ft 5 in (1.96 m)	200 lb (91 kg)	2007–12	Letran	
(Philippines)	Ed Daquioag	G	6 ft 1 in (1.85 m)	170 lb (77 kg)	2016–24	Santo Tomas	
(Philippines)	Diego Dario	G	5 ft 8 in (1.73 m)	145 lb (66 kg)	2019–20; 2023–	UP Diliman	
(Philippines)	Bal David	G	5 ft 9 in (1.75 m)	148 lb (67 kg)	1996–2005	Santo Tomas	
(Philippines)	Gary David	G/F	6 ft 1 in (1.85 m)	175 lb (79 kg)	2004–16	LPU–Manila	
(Philippines)	Samboy de Leon	F	6 ft 3 in (1.91 m)	190 lb (86 kg)	2016–17; 2019–	Centro	
(Philippines)	Ranidel de Ocampo	F	6 ft 6 in (1.98 m)	210 lb (95 kg)	2004–19	St. Francis	
(Philippines)	Yancy de Ocampo	C	6 ft 9 in (2.06 m)	220 lb (100 kg)	2002–19	St. Francis	
(Philippines) (United States)	Karl Dehesa	G	6 ft 2 in (1.88 m)	185 lb (84 kg)	2013–18	Waldorf	
(Philippines)	Richard del Rosario	F/C	6 ft 5 in (1.96 m)	215 lb (98 kg)	1993–03	De La Salle	
(Philippines)	Art dela Cruz	G/F	6 ft 3 in (1.91 m)	170 lb (77 kg)	1991–00	San Sebastian	
(Philippines)	Arthur dela Cruz	F	6 ft 4 in (1.93 m)	198 lb (90 kg)	2015–23	Ateneo de Manila; San Beda	
(Philippines) (United States)	Tony dela Cruz	G/F	6 ft 5 in (1.96 m)	205 lb (93 kg)	1999–17	UC Irvine	
(Philippines) (Canada)	Kelvin dela Peña	G	6 ft 1 in (1.85 m)	180 lb (82 kg)	2008–12	Mapúa	
(Philippines) (United States)	Rome dela Rosa	F	6 ft 3 in (1.91 m)	180 lb (82 kg)	2014–	San Beda	
(Philippines)	Paul Desiderio	G	6 ft 1 in (1.85 m)	168 lb (76 kg)	2018–22	UP Diliman	
(Philippines) (United States)	Jason Deutchman	F	6 ft 6 in (1.98 m)	210 lb (95 kg)	2012–15	San Diego State	
(Philippines) (United States)	Joe Devance	F/C	6 ft 7 in (2.01 m)	215 lb (98 kg)	2007–22	UTEP	
(Philippines) (United States) (Italy)	Michael DiGregorio	G	6 ft 1 in (1.85 m)	185 lb (84 kg)	2015–	McKendree	
(Philippines)	Yves Dignadice	F/C	6 ft 4 in (1.93 m)	210 lb (95 kg)	1986–98; 2000	West Negros; De La Salle	
(Philippines) (United States)	Jared Dillinger	G/F	6 ft 5 in (1.96 m)	200 lb (91 kg)	2008–	The Academy; UH Manoa	
(Philippines)	Aries Dimaunahan	G	6 ft 0 in (1.83 m)	185 lb (84 kg)	2003–13	Santo Tomas	
(Philippines)	Aris Dionisio	G	6 ft 4 in (1.93 m)	No information	2020–	St. Claire	
(Philippines)	Rudy Distrito	G	5 ft 11 in (1.80 m)	165 lb (75 kg)	1981–86; 1987–95	East	
(Philippines)	Axel Doruelo	G	6 ft 0 in (1.83 m)	No information	2011–14	UP Diliman	
(Philippines) (United States)	Don Dulay	G	5 ft 8 in (1.73 m)	150 lb (68 kg)	2007–11	El Camino	
(Philippines)	Jojo Duncil	G	6 ft 1 in (1.85 m)	180 lb (82 kg)	2007–15	Santo Tomas	
(Philippines)	Kenneth Duremdes	G/F	6 ft 4 in (1.93 m)	192 lb (87 kg)	1995–08	Adamson	

== E ==
Nat.	Name	Pos.	Ht.	Wt.	Playing years	College/University	Ref.
(Philippines)	Barkley Eboña	F/C	6 ft 6 in (1.98 m)	194 lb (88 kg)	2020–	Far Eastern	
(Philippines)	Gherome Ejercito	G	6 ft 2 in (1.88 m)	180 lb (82 kg)	2005–09	Adamson	
(Philippines) (United States)	Chris Ellis	F	6 ft 6 in (1.98 m)	195 lb (88 kg)	2012–17	UMH Baylor	
(Philippines)	Nico Elorde	G	5 ft 10 in (1.78 m)	155 lb (70 kg)	2015–21	De La Salle; Ateneo de Manila	
(Philippines)	Samigue Eman	C	6 ft 10 in (2.08 m)	252 lb (114 kg)	2007–16	Mindanao	
(Philippines) (United States)	Simon Enciso	G	5 ft 11 in (1.80 m)	185 lb (84 kg)	2015–	NDNU	
(Philippines)	Ronjay Enrile	G	5 ft 11 in (1.80 m)	168 lb (76 kg)	2006–11	Letran	
(Philippines) (Nigeria)	Joseph Eriobu	F	6 ft 4 in (1.93 m)	205 lb (93 kg)	2016–19; 2021–	Mapúa	
(Philippines)	JP Erram	C	6 ft 8 in (2.03 m)	235 lb (107 kg)	2014–	Ateneo de Cagayan; Ateneo de Manila	
(Philippines)	Macky Escalona	G	5 ft 10 in (1.78 m)	180 lb (82 kg)	2007–09	Ateneo de Manila	
(Philippines)	Pong Escobal	G	6 ft 0 in (1.83 m)	180 lb (82 kg)	2008–12	San Beda	
(Philippines)	Jolly Escobar	F/C	6 ft 5 in (1.96 m)	200 lb (91 kg)	1992–02	East	
(Philippines)	Russel Escoto	F	6 ft 6 in (1.98 m)	200 lb (91 kg)	2016–	Far Eastern	
(Philippines)	Angelito Esguerra	G	6 ft 1 in (1.85 m)	183 lb (83 kg)	1983–89	Letran	
(Philippines)	Gabby Espinas	F	6 ft 4 in (1.93 m)	200 lb (91 kg)	2006–19	PCU	
(Philippines)	Dennis Espino	F/C	6 ft 7 in (2.01 m)	215 lb (98 kg)	1995–11	Santo Tomas	
(Philippines)	Tonyboy Espinosa	G	5 ft 8 in (1.73 m)	146 lb (66 kg)	1997–06	De La Salle	
(Philippines)	Elmer Espiritu	F	6 ft 4 in (1.93 m)	175 lb (79 kg)	2009–15	East	
(Philippines)	Gerry Esplana	G	5 ft 11 in (1.80 m)	180 lb (82 kg)	1990–02	Far Eastern	
(Philippines)	Ernesto Estrada†	F	5 ft 11 in (1.80 m)	No information	1975–82	Visayas	
(Philippines)	Rey Evangelista	F	6 ft 4 in (1.93 m)	180 lb (82 kg)	1994–08	Santo Tomas	
(Philippines)	Chris Exciminiano	G	5 ft 11 in (1.80 m)	185 lb (84 kg)	2013–	Far Eastern	

== More PBA player lists ==
A–E | F–J | K–O | P–T |U–Z
