= List of Philippine Basketball Association players (P–T) =

This is a list of players who have played or currently playing in the Philippine Basketball Association.

Denotes player who is still active in the PBA
Denotes player who has been inducted to the PBA Hall of Fame
Denotes player who has been inducted to the 40 Greatest Players in PBA History

== P ==
Nat.	Name	Pos.	Ht.	Wt.	Playing years	College/University	Ref.
(Philippines)	Victor Pablo	F	6 ft 4 in (1.93 m)	198 lb (90 kg)	1993–08	Far Eastern	
(Philippines) (United States)	Chris Pacana	G	6 ft 0 in (1.83 m)	200 lb (91 kg)	2006–14	St. Francis	
(Philippines)	Manny Pacquiao	G	5 ft 6 in (1.68 m)	143 lb (65 kg)	2014–17	NDDU	
(Philippines)	Renz Palma	G/F	6 ft 1 in (1.85 m)	No information	2017–19	East	
(Philippines)	Manny Paner	F/C	6 ft 2 in (1.88 m)	195 lb (88 kg)	1975–81; 1982–86	Visayas	
(Philippines)	Philip Paniamogan	G	6 ft 0 in (1.83 m)	180 lb (82 kg)	2015–23	Jose Rizal	
(Philippines)	Jun Papa†	F	5 ft 11 in (1.80 m)	180 lb (82 kg)	1975–80	National	
(Philippines)	Andre Paras	F	6 ft 4 in (1.93 m)	217 lb (98 kg)	2021–22	UP Diliman; San Beda	
(Philippines)	Benjie Paras	F/C	6 ft 5 in (1.96 m)	215 lb (98 kg)	1989–03	UP Diliman	
(Philippines) (United States)	Bobby Ray Parks Jr.	G	6 ft 4 in (1.93 m)	215 lb (98 kg)	2018–20	National	
(Philippines)	Alvin Pasaol	F	6 ft 2 in (1.88 m)	200 lb (91 kg)	2021–2025	Holy Cross; East	
(Philippines)	Jake Pascual	F	6 ft 5 in (1.96 m)	205 lb (93 kg)	2014–	San Beda	
(Philippines) (United States)	Kyle Pascual	F/C	6 ft 6 in (1.98 m)	200 lb (91 kg)	2014–	San Beda	
(Philippines)	Ronald Pascual	F	6 ft 3 in (1.91 m)	185 lb (84 kg)	2014–18	San Sebastian	
(Philippines)	Alvin Patrimonio	F	6 ft 3 in (1.91 m)	215 lb (98 kg)	1988–04	Mapúa	
(Philippines) (United States)	Ali Peek	F/C	6 ft 4 in (1.93 m)	250 lb (113 kg)	1998–14	St. Mary's Cal	
(Philippines) (Australia)	Mick Pennisi	C	6 ft 9 in (2.06 m)	230 lb (104 kg)	2000–17	Eastern Michigan	
(Philippines) (United States)	Dorian Peña	F/C	6 ft 7 in (2.01 m)	235 lb (107 kg)	2001–16	Coppin State	
(Philippines) (Hong Kong)	CJ Perez	G/F	6 ft 2 in (1.88 m)	187 lb (85 kg)	2019–	San Sebastian; Ateneo de Manila; LPU–Manila	
(Philippines) (United States)	Jason Perkins	F	6 ft 3 in (1.91 m)	235 lb (107 kg)	2017–	Valley City State; De La Salle	
(Philippines)	Von Pessumal	G	6 ft 2 in (1.88 m)	185 lb (84 kg)	2016–	Ateneo de Manila	
(Philippines)	Marc Pingris	F/C	6 ft 5 in (1.96 m)	200 lb (91 kg)	2004–19	Far Eastern; PSBA	
(Philippines)	John Pinto	G	5 ft 11 in (1.80 m)	195 lb (88 kg)	2014–	Arellano	
(Philippines)	Roger Pogoy	G	6 ft 2 in (1.88 m)	180 lb (82 kg)	2016–	Far Eastern	
(Philippines)	Eliud Poligrates	G	6 ft 0 in (1.83 m)	185 lb (84 kg)	2013–15	Southwestern	
(Philippines)	Dong Polistico	C	6 ft 7 in (2.01 m)	230 lb (104 kg)	1989–97	Letran	
(Philippines)	Jewel Ponferada	C	6 ft 5 in (1.96 m)	212 lb (96 kg)	2012–	National	
(Philippines)	Kris Porter	F/C	6 ft 5 in (1.96 m)	195 lb (88 kg)	2019–22	Ateneo de Manila	
(Philippines) (United States)	Stanley Pringle	G	6 ft 1 in (1.85 m)	184 lb (83 kg)	2014–	Pasco–Hernando; Penn State	
(Philippines)	Rey Publico	F	6 ft 4 in (1.93 m)	201 lb (91 kg)	2020–22	Letran	
(Philippines)	Dindo Pumaren	G	5 ft 9 in (1.75 m)	200 lb (91 kg)	1989–02	De La Salle	
(Philippines)	Franz Pumaren	G	5 ft 9 in (1.75 m)	165 lb (75 kg)	1986–98	De La Salle	

== Q ==
Nat.	Name	Pos.	Ht.	Wt.	Playing years	College/University	Ref.
(Philippines)	J.R. Quiñahan	F/C	6 ft 6 in (1.98 m)	230 lb (104 kg)	2007–23	Visayas	
(Philippines)	Eugene Quilban	G	5 ft 7 in (1.70 m)	No information	1991–97; 1999	Manila; San Sebastian	
(Philippines)	Bong Quinto	G/F	6 ft 2 in (1.88 m)	No information	2019–23	Letran	

== R ==
Nat.	Name	Pos.	Ht.	Wt.	Playing years	College/University	Ref.
(Philippines)	Kevin Racal	F	6 ft 3 in (1.91 m)	175 lb (79 kg)	2015–	Muntinlupa; Letran	
(Philippines)	Olsen Racela	G	5 ft 11 in (1.80 m)	165 lb (75 kg)	1993–11	Ateneo de Manila	
(Philippines)	Kevin Ramas	C	6 ft 4 in (1.93 m)	240 lb (109 kg)	1992–01	Mapúa	
(Philippines)	Aldrech Ramos	F	6 ft 6 in (1.98 m)	198 lb (90 kg)	2012–	Far Eastern	
(Philippines)	Neil Rañeses	F	6 ft 4 in (1.93 m)	190 lb (86 kg)	2005–07	Visayas	
(Philippines)	Biboy Ravanes	G/F	6 ft 1 in (1.85 m)	185 lb (84 kg)	1979–94	Cebu	
(Philippines)	Bong Ravena	G/F	6 ft 2 in (1.88 m)	195 lb (88 kg)	1992–05	East	
(Philippines)	Kiefer Ravena	G	6 ft 0 in (1.83 m)	180 lb (82 kg)	2017–21	Ateneo de Manila	
(Philippines)	John Raymundo	G	5 ft 10 in (1.78 m)	170 lb (77 kg)	2000–13	San Sebastian	
(Philippines)	Kerby Raymundo	F/C	6 ft 6 in (1.98 m)	205 lb (93 kg)	2011–16	Letran	
(Philippines)	Zaldy Realubit	G/F	6 ft 6 in (1.98 m)	No information	1989–05	San Jose	
(Philippines) (United States)	Rafi Reavis	C	6 ft 9 in (2.06 m)	210 lb (95 kg)	2000–	Coppin State	
(Philippines)	David Regullano	C	6 ft 2 in (1.88 m)	No information	No information	Letran	
(Philippines)	Ricky Relosa	F/C	6 ft 4 in (1.93 m)	198 lb (90 kg)	1982–93	No information	
(Philippines)	LA Revilla	G	5 ft 8 in (1.73 m)	165 lb (75 kg)	2013–20	De La Salle	
(Philippines)	Edmund Reyes	F	6 ft 3 in (1.91 m)	198 lb (90 kg)	1995–04	Santo Tomas	
(Philippines)	Eric Reyes	F	6 ft 3 in (1.91 m)	205 lb (93 kg)	1995–02	Ateneo de Manila	
(Philippines)	Jai Reyes	G	5 ft 8 in (1.73 m)	160 lb (73 kg)	2010–11; 2013–16	Ateneo de Manila	
(Philippines)	Jay-R Reyes	F/C	6 ft 7 in (2.01 m)	215 lb (98 kg)	2006–20	UP Diliman	
(Philippines)	Jun Reyes	G	5 ft 8 in (1.73 m)	160 lb (73 kg)	1990–02	Ateneo de Manila	
(Philippines)	Raphy Reyes	G	5 ft 10 in (1.78 m)	165 lb (75 kg)	2012–16	East	
(Philippines) (United States)	Rob Reyes	F/C	6 ft 6 in (1.98 m)	215 lb (98 kg)	2008–16	Flagler	
(Philippines) (United States)	Ryan Reyes	G	6 ft 1 in (1.85 m)	180 lb (82 kg)	2007–	Cal State Fullerton	
(Philippines)	Alberto Reynoso†	C	6 ft 3 in (1.91 m)	220 lb (100 kg)	1975–77	San Beda	
(Philippines) (United States)	Troy Rike	F/C	6 ft 7 in (2.01 m)	102 lb (46 kg)	2021–22	Wake Forest; National	
(Philippines)	Jansen Rios	G/F	6 ft 3 in (1.91 m)	185 lb (84 kg)	2015–	Adamson	
(Philippines)	Renren Ritualo	G	6 ft 1 in (1.85 m)	170 lb (77 kg)	2002–14	De La Salle	
(Philippines)	Ricci Rivero	G/F	6 ft 1 in (1.85 m)	146 lb (66 kg)	2023–	De La Salle; UP Diliman	
(Philippines)	R.J. Rizada	G	6 ft 2 in (1.88 m)	175 lb (79 kg)	2006–13	Far Eastern	
(Philippines)	Topex Robinson	G	5 ft 8 in (1.73 m)	155 lb (70 kg)	2003–11	San Sebastian	
(Philippines)	Billy Robles	G	6 ft 0 in (1.83 m)	No information	2016–17	NISU	
(Philippines)	Erick Rodriguez	F	6 ft 5 in (1.96 m)	200 lb (91 kg)	2009–11	Letran	
(Philippines)	Larry Rodriguez	F	6 ft 4 in (1.93 m)	200 lb (91 kg)	2008–16	PMI	
(Philippines)	Joaquín Rojas†	G	5 ft 7 in (1.70 m)	138 lb (63 kg)	1975–76	Cebu	
(Philippines)	Dennis Roldan	G	6 ft 0 in (1.83 m)	No information	No information	Trinity; Far Eastern	
(Philippines)	Terrence Romeo	G	5 ft 11 in (1.80 m)	178 lb (81 kg)	2013–	Far Eastern	
(Philippines) (United States)	Kris Rosales	G	6 ft 0 in (1.83 m)	165 lb (75 kg)	2016–17; 2019–	Hope Int'l	
(Philippines)	Troy Rosario	F/C	6 ft 7 in (2.01 m)	218 lb (99 kg)	2015–	TIP; National	
(Philippines) (United States)	Chris Ross	G	6 ft 1 in (1.85 m)	185 lb (84 kg)	2009–	Panola; McLennan CC; Marshall	

== S ==
Nat.	Name	Pos.	Ht.	Wt.	Playing years	College/University	Ref.
(Philippines)	Allan Salangsang	F	6 ft 5 in (1.96 m)	200 lb (91 kg)	2004–10	Letran	
(Philippines)	Rino Salazar	G	5 ft 9 in (1.75 m)	160 lb (73 kg)	1975–81	Letran	
(Philippines)	Terry Saldaña	F/C	6 ft 3 in (1.91 m)	190 lb (86 kg)	1982–00	Santo Tomas	
(Philippines)	Nico Salva	F	6 ft 3 in (1.91 m)	194 lb (88 kg)	2013–22	Ateneo de Manila	
(Philippines)	Sunday Salvacion	F	6 ft 3 in (1.91 m)	180 lb (82 kg)	2003–16	Olivarez; Benilde	
(Philippines)	Jondan Salvador	F/C	6 ft 3 in (1.91 m)	210 lb (95 kg)	2005–15	Benilde	
(Philippines)	Marte Samson	F	6 ft 1 in (1.85 m)	180 lb (82 kg)	No information	Ateneo de Manila	
(Philippines)	Ian Sangalang	C	6 ft 6 in (1.98 m)	212 lb (96 kg)	2013–	San Sebastian	
(Philippines)	Adonis Santa Maria	F/C	6 ft 5 in (1.96 m)	205 lb (93 kg)	2003–10	De La Salle	
(Philippines)	Jack Santiago	G	5 ft 10 in (1.78 m)	175 lb (79 kg)	1996–01	Mapúa	
(Philippines)	Leonard Santillan	F	6 ft 4 in (1.93 m)	210 lb (95 kg)	2021–	Visayas; De La Salle	
(Philippines)	Arwind Santos	F	6 ft 4 in (1.93 m)	170 lb (77 kg)	2006–23	Far Eastern	
(Philippines)	Jimmy Santos	F	6 ft 2 in (1.88 m)	187 lb (85 kg)	1975–76	Jose Rizal	
(Philippines)	Rodney Santos	G/F	6 ft 2 in (1.88 m)	175 lb (79 kg)	1996–09	San Sebastian	
(Philippines)	Homer Se	C	6 ft 6 in (1.98 m)	215 lb (98 kg)	2002–12	San Sebastian	
(Philippines) (United States)	Andy Seigle	C	6 ft 10 in (2.08 m)	235 lb (107 kg)	1997–07	New Orleans	
(Philippines) (United States)	Danny Seigle	F	6 ft 6 in (1.98 m)	205 lb (93 kg)	1999–17	Wagner	
(Philippines) (Australia) (Czech Republic)	Anthony Semerad	F	6 ft 5 in (1.96 m)	220 lb (100 kg)	2014–	San Beda	
(Philippines) (Australia) (Czech Republic)	David Semerad	F	6 ft 5 in (1.96 m)	220 lb (100 kg)	2014–21	San Beda	
(Philippines)	James Sena	F/C	6 ft 5 in (1.96 m)	208 lb (94 kg)	2011–24	Jose Rizal	
(Philippines)	Carlo Sharma	F/C	6 ft 6 in (1.98 m)	220 lb (100 kg)	2004–15	De La Salle	
(Philippines) (United States)	Maurice Shaw	C	6 ft 8 in (2.03 m)	260 lb (118 kg)	2019–20	Hutchinson CC	
(Philippines)	Peter June Simon	G	6 ft 0 in (1.83 m)	180 lb (82 kg)	2004–20	Mindanao	
(Philippines)	Dale Singson	G	6 ft 0 in (1.83 m)	184 lb (83 kg)	2000–07	Santo Tomas	
(Philippines)	Magi Sison	C	6 ft 7 in (2.01 m)	210 lb (95 kg)	2011–14	UP Diliman	
(Philippines) (United States)	Greg Slaughter	C	7 ft 0 in (2.13 m)	258 lb (117 kg)	2013–20; 2021	Visayas; Ateneo de Manila	
(Philippines)	Al Solis	G	5 ft 11 in (1.80 m)	180 lb (82 kg)	1987–01	Visayas	
(Philippines)	Ervin Sotto	F/C	6 ft 7 in (2.01 m)	210 lb (95 kg)	2004–12	St. Francis	
(Philippines)	Raul Soyud	C	6 ft 6 in (1.98 m)	222 lb (101 kg)	2015–	UP Diliman	
(Philippines) (Germany)	Christian Standhardinger	F/C	6 ft 8 in (2.03 m)	220 lb (100 kg)	2018–	Nebraska; UH Mānoa	
(Philippines)	Renzo Subido	G	6 ft 6 in (1.98 m)	222 lb (101 kg)	2020–22	Santo Tomas	
(Philippines)	Roi Sumang	G	5 ft 8 in (1.73 m)	155 lb (70 kg)	2015–23	East	

== T ==
Nat.	Name	Pos.	Ht.	Wt.	Playing years	College/University	Ref.
(Philippines)	Paolo Taha	G	6 ft 0 in (1.83 m)	180 lb (82 kg)	2014–	Benilde	
(Philippines) (Palestine)	Yousef Taha	C	6 ft 7 in (2.01 m)	245 lb (111 kg)	2012–19; 2021–24	North Lake; Mapúa	
(Philippines)	Mac Tallo	G	6 ft 0 in (1.83 m)	200 lb (91 kg)	2017–19; 2023	De La Salle; Southwestern	
(Philippines)	Chris Tan	G	6 ft 2 in (1.88 m)	199 lb (90 kg)	2000–03	De La Salle	
(Philippines)	TY Tang	G	5 ft 7 in (1.70 m)	135 lb (61 kg)	2008–15	De La Salle	
(Philippines)	Jojo Tangkay	G/F	6 ft 2 in (1.88 m)	168 lb (76 kg)	2001–08	Southwestern	
(Philippines)	Siot Tanquingcen	G	5 ft 9 in (1.75 m)	150 lb (68 kg)	1995–98	Santo Tomas	
(Philippines)	Jack Tanuan†	C	6 ft 5 in (1.96 m)	215 lb (98 kg)	1988–97	Far Eastern	
(Philippines) (Tonga)	Asi Taulava	C	6 ft 9 in (2.06 m)	245 lb (111 kg)	1997–	BYU Hawaii	
(Philippines) (United States) (Tonga)	Moala Tautuaa	F/C	6 ft 8 in (2.03 m)	237 lb (108 kg)	2012–	Chadron	
(Philippines)	Mark Telan	F/C	6 ft 7 in (2.01 m)	210 lb (95 kg)	1999–11	De La Salle	
(Philippines)	Alvin Teng	F	6 ft 4 in (1.93 m)	187 lb (85 kg)	1986–02	Arellano	
(Philippines)	Jeric Teng	G	6 ft 2 in (1.88 m)	182 lb (83 kg)	2013–19	Santo Tomas	
(Philippines)	Jeron Teng	G/F	6 ft 2 in (1.88 m)	185 lb (84 kg)	2017–	De La Salle	
(Philippines)	LA Tenorio	G	5 ft 8 in (1.73 m)	151 lb (68 kg)	2006–	Ateneo de Manila	
(Philippines)	Teytey Teodoro	G	5 ft 10 in (1.78 m)	185 lb (84 kg)	2019	Jose Rizal	
(Philippines)	Hans Thiele	C	6 ft 5 in (1.96 m)	200 lb (91 kg)	2010–15	East	
(Philippines)	Scottie Thompson	G	6 ft 1 in (1.85 m)	180 lb (82 kg)	2015–	Perpetual	
(Philippines) (Papua New Guinea)	Sonny Thoss	C	6 ft 7 in (2.01 m)	215 lb (98 kg)	2004–19	James Cook	
(Philippines)	Richie Ticzon	G	5 ft 8 in (1.73 m)	160 lb (73 kg)	1994–98; 2001–02	Ateneo de Manila	
(Philippines) (United States)	Chris Timberlake	G	6 ft 0 in (1.83 m)	182 lb (83 kg)	2009–15	North Florida	
(Philippines)	Juami Tiongson	G	5 ft 10 in (1.78 m)	175 lb (79 kg)	2014–	Ateneo de Manila	
(Philippines)	Tyler Tio	G	6 ft 0 in (1.83 m)	170 lb (77 kg)	2022–	Ateneo de Manila	
(Philippines)	Chris Tiu	G	6 ft 0 in (1.83 m)	165 lb (75 kg)	2012–18	Ateneo de Manila	
(Philippines)	Arvin Tolentino	F	6 ft 5 in (1.96 m)	210 lb (95 kg)	2020–	Ateneo de Manila; Far Eastern	
(Philippines)	Elias Tolentino†	G	6 ft 1 in (1.85 m)	No information	1976–77	Jose Rizal	
(Philippines)	Mike Tolomia	G	5 ft 11 in (1.80 m)	160 lb (73 kg)	2016–24	Far Eastern	
(Philippines)	Jimwell Torion	G	5 ft 9 in (1.75 m)	149 lb (68 kg)	2000–07	Salazar Colleges	
(Philippines) (Canada)	Norbert Torres	F/C	6 ft 7 in (2.01 m)	250 lb (113 kg)	2015–	De La Salle	
(Philippines) (United States)	Abu Tratter	F/C	6 ft 5 in (1.96 m)	231 lb (105 kg)	2019–	De La Salle	
(Philippines)	Don Trollano	F	6 ft 4 in (1.93 m)	180 lb (82 kg)	2015–	Adamson	
(Philippines)	Arnie Tuadles†	F	6 ft 2 in (1.88 m)	170 lb (77 kg)	1979–92	Visayas	
(Philippines)	Ronald Tubid	G/F	6 ft 1 in (1.85 m)	174 lb (79 kg)	2003–19; 2022	East	
(Philippines) (New Zealand)	Ken Tuffin	F	6 ft 4 in (1.93 m)	No information	2020–	Far Eastern	
(Philippines)	Lordy Tugade	G/F	6 ft 3 in (1.91 m)	180 lb (82 kg)	2000–12	National	

== More PBA player lists ==
A – E | F – J | K – O | P – T | U – Z
