= List of Philippine Basketball Association players (U–Z) =

This is a list of players who have played or currently playing in the Philippine Basketball Association.

Denotes player who is still active in the PBA
Denotes player who has been inducted to the PBA Hall of Fame
Denotes player who has been inducted to the 40 Greatest Players in PBA History

== U ==
Nat.	Name	Pos.	Ht.	Wt.	Playing years	College/University	Ref.
(Philippines)	Ato Ular	F	6 ft 4 in (1.93 m)	196 lb (89 kg)	2022–	Tarlac State; Letran	
(Philippines) (United States)	Josh Urbiztondo	G	6 ft 0 in (1.83 m)	185 lb (84 kg)	2009–17	Foothill; Fresno Pacific	
(Philippines) (United States)	Jonathan Uyloan	G	6 ft 0 in (1.83 m)	185 lb (84 kg)	2009–18	Golden West	

== V ==
Nat.	Name	Pos.	Ht.	Wt.	Playing years	College/University	Ref.
(Philippines)	Turo Valenzona	F	5 ft 9 in (1.75 m)	160 lb (73 kg)	1975	Far Eastern	
(Philippines)	Junthy Valenzuela	G/F	6 ft 3 in (1.91 m)	180 lb (82 kg)	2000–10	Salazar Colleges	
(Philippines) (Germany)	Arnold Van Opstal	C	6 ft 9 in (2.06 m)	220 lb (100 kg)	2016–18	De La Salle	
(Philippines) (United States) (Germany)	Josh Vanlandingham	F	6 ft 4 in (1.93 m)	190 lb (86 kg)	2010–16	Pacific Lutheran	
(Philippines) (United States)	Paul Varilla	F	6 ft 3 in (1.91 m)	185 lb (84 kg)	2018–	East	
(Philippines)	Al Vergara	G	5 ft 8 in (1.73 m)	145 lb (66 kg)	2008–12	St. Francis	
(Philippines)	Chito Victolero	G	5 ft 11 in (1.80 m)	160 lb (73 kg)	2002–05	Mapúa	
(Philippines)	Boybits Victoria†	G	No information	No information	1994–01	San Beda	
(Philippines)	Manny Victorino	F/C	6 ft 5 in (1.96 m)	202 lb (92 kg)	1981–86	Jose Rizal	
(Philippines)	Jeff Viernes	G	5 ft 7 in (1.70 m)	143 lb (65 kg)	2017–18	MMC; Manila; St. Claire	
(Philippines)	Louie Vigil	G/F	6 ft 3 in (1.91 m)	200 lb (91 kg)	2017–23	Santo Tomas	
(Philippines)	Elpidio Villamin	F/C	6 ft 2 in (1.88 m)	188 lb (85 kg)	1981–98	Far Eastern	
(Philippines)	Dennice Villamor	F	6 ft 4 in (1.93 m)	195 lb (88 kg)	2015–16	National	
(Philippines)	Enrico Villanueva	F/C	6 ft 6 in (1.98 m)	220 lb (100 kg)	2003–17	Ateneo de Manila	
(Philippines)	Jonas Villanueva	G	6 ft 0 in (1.83 m)	180 lb (82 kg)	2007–17	Far Eastern	
(Philippines)	Pocholo Villanueva	G	6 ft 0 in (1.83 m)	169 lb (77 kg)	2008–11	De La Salle	
(Philippines)	Jim Bruce Viray	G/F	6 ft 3 in (1.91 m)	190 lb (86 kg)	2009–11	San Sebastian	
(Philippines)	Almond Vosotros	G	5 ft 10 in (1.78 m)	160 lb (73 kg)	2015–16; 2019–2020; 2024–2025	De La Salle	

== W ==
Nat.	Name	Pos.	Ht.	Wt.	Playing years	College/University	Ref.
(Philippines) (United States)	Rob Wainwright	F	6 ft 5 in (1.96 m)	195 lb (88 kg)	2000–11	Solano CC	
(Philippines) (United States)	Jay Washington	F	6 ft 7 in (2.01 m)	235 lb (107 kg)	2005–22	Eckerd	
(Philippines)	Freddie Webb	G	5 ft 10 in (1.78 m)	148 lb (67 kg)	1976–78	Letran	
(Philippines)	Jason Webb	G	6 ft 2 in (1.88 m)	170 lb (77 kg)	1997–01	De La Salle	
(Philippines) (United States)	Shawn Weinstein	G	6 ft 0 in (1.83 m)	180 lb (82 kg)	2008–15	St. Edward's	
(Philippines) (United States)	Kelly Williams	F	6 ft 7 in (2.01 m)	215 lb (98 kg)	2006–19; 2021–	Oakland	
(Philippines) (United States)	Mikey Williams	G	6 ft 2 in (1.88 m)	190 lb (86 kg)	2021–23	USF; Cal State Fullerton	
(Philippines)	John Wilson	G	6 ft 1 in (1.85 m)	185 lb (84 kg)	2010–18	Jose Rizal	
(Philippines) (United States)	Willy Wilson	F	6 ft 3 in (1.91 m)	215 lb (98 kg)	2004–19	De La Salle	
(Philippines) (United States)	Adrian Wong	G	6 ft 3 in (1.91 m)	175 lb (79 kg)	2019–24	Ateneo de Manila	
(Philippines) (Canada)	Matthew Wright	G	6 ft 4 in (1.93 m)	200 lb (91 kg)	2014–22	St. Bonaventure	

== Y ==
Nat.	Name	Pos.	Ht.	Wt.	Playing years	College/University	Ref.
(Philippines)	James Yap	G/F	6 ft 3 in (1.91 m)	205 lb (93 kg)	2004–21; 2023–	East	
(Philippines)	Roger Yap	G	6 ft 1 in (1.85 m)	170 lb (77 kg)	2001–13	San Jose	
(Philippines)	Warren Ybañez	G	5 ft 8 in (1.73 m)	155 lb (70 kg)	2004–09	PSBA	
(Philippines)	Mark Yee	F	6 ft 3 in (1.91 m)	170 lb (77 kg)	2008–18	SSC–R Cavite	
(Philippines)	Richard Yee	F/C	6 ft 4 in (1.93 m)	200 lb (91 kg)	1999–11	Santo Tomas	
(Philippines)	Joseph Yeo	G	6 ft 0 in (1.83 m)	185 lb (84 kg)	2006–17	De La Salle	
(Philippines)	Tonichi Yturri	C	6 ft 6 in (1.98 m)	185 lb (84 kg)	1989–92	De La Salle	

== Z ==
Nat.	Name	Pos.	Ht.	Wt.	Playing years	College/University	Ref.
(Philippines)	Keith Zaldivar	C	6 ft 6 in (1.98 m)	No information	2022–	Adamson	
(Philippines)	Paul Zamar	G	5 ft 10 in (1.78 m)	179 lb (81 kg)	2018–	East	

== More PBA player lists ==
A–E | F–J | K–O | P–T | U–Z
