= List of Philippine Basketball Association players (K–O) =

This is a list of players who have played or currently playing in the Philippine Basketball Association.

Denotes player who is still active in the PBA
Denotes player who has been inducted to the PBA Hall of Fame
Denotes player who has been inducted to the 40 Greatest Players in PBA History

== K ==
Nat.	Name	Pos.	Ht.	Wt.	Playing years	College/University	Ref.
(Philippines)	Glenn Khobuntin	F	6 ft 4 in (1.93 m)	192 lb (87 kg)	2015–	National	
(Philippines)	Abe King	F/C	6 ft 3 in (1.91 m)	187 lb (85 kg)	1977–94	San Beda	
(Philippines) (United States)	Jerramy King	G	6 ft 0 in (1.83 m)	165 lb (75 kg)	2017–19	The Beach	
(Philippines)	Doug Kramer	F	6 ft 5 in (1.96 m)	210 lb (95 kg)	2007–19	Ateneo de Manila	
(Philippines) (Canada)	James Kwekuteye	G	6 ft 2 in (1.88 m)	182 lb (83 kg)	2023–	San Beda	

== L ==
Nat.	Name	Pos.	Ht.	Wt.	Playing years	College/University	Ref.
(Philippines)	Rob Labagala	G	5 ft 9 in (1.75 m)	145 lb (66 kg)	2010–15	East	
(Philippines)	Dwight Lago	G/F	6 ft 3 in (1.91 m)	200 lb (91 kg)	1993–02	De La Salle	
(Philippines)	Elmer Lago	G/F	6 ft 3 in (1.91 m)	188 lb (85 kg)	1995–05	De La Salle	
(Philippines)	Chico Lanete	G	6 ft 0 in (1.83 m)	180 lb (82 kg)	2007–19	LPU–Manila	
(Philippines)	Garvo Lanete	G	6 ft 1 in (1.85 m)	183 lb (83 kg)	2015–21	San Beda	
(Philippines)	Gilbert Lao	C	6 ft 8 in (2.03 m)	210 lb (95 kg)	2002–14	Santo Tomas	
(Philippines)	Ardy Larong	G/F	6 ft 3 in (1.91 m)	180 lb (82 kg)	2007–10	San Jose	
(Philippines) (United States)	Marcio Lassiter	G	6 ft 2 in (1.88 m)	185 lb (84 kg)	2011–	San Francisco; Cal State Fullerton	
(Philippines)	Carlo Lastimosa	G	5 ft 11 in (1.80 m)	182 lb (83 kg)	2013–18	Benilde	
(Philippines)	Jerom Lastimosa	G	5 ft 11 in (1.80 m)	No information	2024–	Adamson	
(Philippines)	Jojo Lastimosa	G/F	6 ft 1 in (1.85 m)	180 lb (82 kg)	1988–02	San Jose; Ateneo de Manila	
(Philippines)	Eddie Laure	F	6 ft 3 in (1.91 m)	195 lb (88 kg)	2003–16	Adamson	
(Philippines)	Paul Lee	G	6 ft 1 in (1.85 m)	200 lb (91 kg)	2011–	East	
(Philippines)	Lim Eng Beng†	G	5 ft 11 in (1.80 m)	175 lb (79 kg)	1976–82	De La Salle	
(Philippines)	Frankie Lim	G	5 ft 11 in (1.80 m)	154 lb (70 kg)	1982–96	San Beda	
(Philippines)	Samboy Lim	F	6 ft 0 in (1.83 m)	180 lb (82 kg)	1986–97	Letran	
(Philippines)	Jun Limpot	C	6 ft 6 in (1.98 m)	210 lb (95 kg)	1993–07	De La Salle	
(Philippines)	Rudy Lingganay	G	5 ft 11 in (1.80 m)	170 lb (77 kg)	2011–15; 2017	East	
(Philippines)	Noli Locsin	F	6 ft 3 in (1.91 m)	250 lb (113 kg)	1994–05	De La Salle	
(Philippines)	Denver Lopez	G	6 ft 2 in (1.88 m)	179 lb (81 kg)	2004–09	Cal State Fullerton	
(Philippines)	Chito Loyzaga	G/F	6 ft 3 in (1.91 m)	200 lb (91 kg)	1981–93	San Beda	
(Philippines)	Joey Loyzaga	G/F	6 ft 1 in (1.85 m)	179 lb (81 kg)	1984–94	San Beda	
(Philippines) (United States)	Christian Luanzon	G/F	6 ft 4 in (1.93 m)	190 lb (86 kg)	2006–08	Santo Tomas	
(Philippines) (United States)	Chris Lutz	G	6 ft 3 in (1.91 m)	200 lb (91 kg)	2011–16	Purdue; Marshall	

== M ==
Nat.	Name	Pos.	Ht.	Wt.	Playing years	College/University	Ref.
(Philippines)	Michael Mabulac	F/C	6 ft 4 in (1.93 m)	218 lb (99 kg)	2015–18	Jose Rizal	
(Philippines)	Mark Macapagal	G/F	6 ft 2 in (1.88 m)	185 lb (84 kg)	2005–15	San Sebastian	
(Philippines)	Edgar Macaraya	G/F	6 ft 0 in (1.83 m)	170 lb (77 kg)	1990–93	San Sebastian	
(Philippines)	Marion Magat	F/C	6 ft 7 in (2.01 m)	180 lb (82 kg)	2015–22	National	
(Philippines)	Ronnie Magsanoc	G	5 ft 9 in (1.75 m)	155 lb (70 kg)	1988–02	UP Diliman	
(Philippines)	Mark Magsumbol	G	6 ft 3 in (1.91 m)	140 lb (64 kg)	2006–08	Benilde	
(Philippines)	Rico Maierhofer	F	6 ft 6 in (1.98 m)	175 lb (79 kg)	2009–17	De La Salle	
(Philippines)	Allein Maliksi	F	6 ft 3 in (1.91 m)	180 lb (82 kg)	2011–	Santo Tomas	
(Philippines) (United States)	Alex Mallari	G	6 ft 4 in (1.93 m)	176 lb (80 kg)	2012–20	Lewis–Clark State	
(Philippines) (United States)	Jamie Malonzo	F	6 ft 7 in (2.01 m)	210 lb (95 kg)	2021–	Highline CC; Portland State; De La Salle	
(Philippines)	Melvin Mamaclay	F	6 ft 5 in (1.96 m)	190 lb (86 kg)	2007–09	Adamson	
(Philippines)	Billy Mamaril	C	6 ft 6 in (1.98 m)	210 lb (95 kg)	2003–20	Bakersfield	
(Philippines)	Gian Mamuyac	G	6 ft 2 in (1.88 m)	165 lb (75 kg)	2022–	Ateneo de Manila	
(Philippines) (Canada)	A. J. Mandani	G	5 ft 11 in (1.80 m)	190 lb (86 kg)	2012–16	South Suburban; Missouri S&T	
(Philippines)	Jeff Manday	F	6 ft 0 in (1.83 m)	177 lb (80 kg)	2021–	Santa Ana de Victorias	
(Philippines) (United States)	Sean Manganti	F	6 ft 5 in (1.96 m)	188 lb (85 kg)	2019–	UMPI; Adamson	
(Philippines)	Vic Manuel	F	6 ft 4 in (1.93 m)	200 lb (91 kg)	2012–	PSBA	
(Philippines)	Ric-Ric Marata†	G	5 ft 9 in (1.75 m)	145 lb (66 kg)	1989–97	Southwestern	
(Philippines)	Sam Marata	G	6 ft 2 in (1.88 m)	179 lb (81 kg)	2013–14	De La Salle; UP Diliman	
(Philippines)	Jaycee Marcelino	G	5 ft 9 in (1.75 m)	151 lb (68 kg)	2020–22	LPU–Manila	
(Philippines)	Dave Marcelo	C	6 ft 5 in (1.96 m)	227 lb (103 kg)	2012–	San Beda	
(Philippines)	Aljon Mariano	F	6 ft 3 in (1.91 m)	175 lb (79 kg)	2015–	Santo Tomas	
(Philippines)	Jimmy Mariano	F	6 ft 4 in (1.93 m)	160 lb (73 kg)	1975–78	East	
(Philippines)	Alfonso Marquez	G	6 ft 1 in (1.85 m)	170 lb (77 kg)	No information	Visayas	
(Philippines)	Joey Marquez	F	6 ft 2 in (1.88 m)	175 lb (79 kg)	1981–87	Angeles	
(Philippines)	James Martinez	G	5 ft 9 in (1.75 m)	170 lb (77 kg)	2011–12	East	
(Philippines)	Yoyong Martirez	G	5 ft 8 in (1.73 m)	160 lb (73 kg)	1975–82	Southwestern	
(Philippines)	Ronnie Matias	F	6 ft 4 in (1.93 m)	184 lb (83 kg)	2009–18	Manila	
(Philippines) (Canada)	Will McAloney	F/C	6 ft 5 in (1.96 m)	No information	2021–22	San Carlos	
(Philippines) (United States)	Rashawn McCarthy	G	6 ft 1 in (1.85 m)	175 lb (79 kg)	2016–23	Old Westbury	
(Philippines) (United States)	Justin Melton	G	5 ft 11 in (1.80 m)	163 lb (74 kg)	2013–22	Mount Olive	
(Philippines)	Magnum Membrere	G	5 ft 11 in (1.80 m)	170 lb (77 kg)	2006–12	Ateneo de Manila	
(Philippines)	Gryann Mendoza	G	6 ft 1 in (1.85 m)	180 lb (82 kg)	2016–18; 2020–	Far Eastern	
(Philippines)	Paolo Mendoza	G	5 ft 11 in (1.80 m)	165 lb (75 kg)	2000–11	UP Diliman	
(Philippines)	Vergel Meneses	F	6 ft 3 in (1.91 m)	205 lb (93 kg)	1992–06	Jose Rizal	
(Philippines) (United States)	Eric Menk	F/C	6 ft 6 in (1.98 m)	220 lb (100 kg)	1996–16	Lake State	
(Philippines)	Ogie Menor	G/F	6 ft 1 in (1.85 m)	210 lb (95 kg)	2009–14	San Beda	
(Philippines)	Joey Mente†	G	5 ft 9 in (1.75 m)	180 lb (82 kg)	2001–08	LPU–Manila	
(Philippines) (United States)	Sol Mercado	G	6 ft 1 in (1.85 m)	200 lb (91 kg)	2008–19	Biola	
(Philippines)	Willie Miller	G	5 ft 11 in (1.80 m)	195 lb (88 kg)	1999–16	Letran	
(Philippines)	Dennis Miranda	G	6 ft 0 in (1.83 m)	180 lb (82 kg)	2005–17	Far Eastern	
(Philippines)	Michael Miranda	F/C	6 ft 6 in (1.98 m)	210 lb (95 kg)	2015–	San Sebastian	
(Philippines)	Khasim Mirza	F	6 ft 5 in (1.96 m)	195 lb (88 kg)	2009–12	Santo Tomas	
(Philippines)	Jason Misolas	F	6 ft 3 in (1.91 m)	190 lb (86 kg)	2002–11	Letran	
(Philippines)	Javee Mocon	F	6 ft 3 in (1.91 m)	189 lb (86 kg)	2019–	San Beda	
(Philippines)	Emman Monfort	G	5 ft 6 in (1.68 m)	135 lb (61 kg)	2012–19	Ateneo de Manila	
(Philippines)	Kib Montalbo	G	6 ft 0 in (1.83 m)	155 lb (70 kg)	2020–	De La Salle	
(Philippines)	Lawrence Mumar	G	5 ft 11 in (1.80 m)	136 lb (62 kg)	1975–81	Santo Tomas	
(Philippines) (United States)	Joshua Munzon	F	6 ft 4 in (1.93 m)	196 lb (89 kg)	2021–	Cal State LA	
(Philippines)	Larry Muyang	C	6 ft 6 in (1.98 m)	220 lb (100 kg)	2021–	De La Salle; Letran	

== N ==
Nat.	Name	Pos.	Ht.	Wt.	Playing years	College/University	Ref.
(Philippines) (United States)	Kelly Nabong	C	6 ft 7 in (2.01 m)	237 lb (108 kg)	2012–22	Santa Rosa	
(Philippines)	Leo Najorda	F	6 ft 3 in (1.91 m)	210 lb (95 kg)	2005–15	San Sebastian	
(Philippines)	Rey Nambatac	G	6 ft 0 in (1.83 m)	No information	2017–	Letran	
(Philippines)	Evan Nelle	G	5 ft 11 in (1.80 m)	No information	2024–	San Beda; De La Salle	
(Philippines) (United States)	Chris Newsome	F	6 ft 2 in (1.88 m)	190 lb (86 kg)	2015–	NMHU; Ateneo de Manila	
(Philippines)	Josan Nimes	G/F	6 ft 3 in (1.91 m)	175 lb (79 kg)	2015–17	Mapúa	
(Philippines)	Adrian Nocum	G	6 ft 0 in (1.83 m)	No information	2023–	Mapúa	
(Philippines) (United States)	Gabe Norwood	G/F	6 ft 5 in (1.96 m)	190 lb (86 kg)	2008–	George Mason	
(Philippines)	Alex Nuyles	G	6 ft 2 in (1.88 m)	199 lb (90 kg)	2013–18	Adamson	

== O ==
Nat.	Name	Pos.	Ht.	Wt.	Playing years	College/University	Ref.
(Philippines)	Calvin Oftana	F	6 ft 5 in (1.96 m)	186 lb (84 kg)	2021–	San Beda	
(Philippines)	Nelbert Omolon	F	6 ft 4 in (1.93 m)	180 lb (82 kg)	2004–16	PCU	
(Philippines) (Nigeria)	Sidney Onwubere	F	6 ft 4 in (1.93 m)	No information	2017–	EAC	
(Philippines)	Emmerson Oreta	G	6 ft 2 in (1.88 m)	180 lb (82 kg)	2010–13	Santo Tomas	

== More PBA player lists ==
A–E | F–J | K–O | P–T | U–Z
