= Filsports Basketball Association =

Filsports Basketball Association (FBA)
- Sport: Basketball
- Founded: January 2015
- Folded: 2016
- President: LJ Serrano
- Commissioner: Vince Hizon
- Country: Philippines
- Continent: Asia
- Broadcaster: AksyonTV
- Website: www.fba.ph

Filsports Basketball Association (FBA) was a regional grassroots amateur basketball league based in the Philippines, aiming to discover young and talented basketball players from the provinces and regions. Formed in January 2015, by a group of basketball stakeholders including former Brgy. Ginebra San Miguel player Vince Hizon and LJ Serrano, the FBA is sanctioned by the Samahang Basketbol ng Pilipinas in accordance to the FIBA rules.

The opening of the inaugural conference of the FBA was commenced on January 24, 2015, at the Malolos Sports Complex in Bulacan, consisting of the exhibition game between the PBA Legends and the Malolos Agilas team. The inaugural conference is consisting of 8 teams, including the Foton Tornadoes, the first franchise team of the FBA. Eventually, the UP Fighting Maroons basketball team bringing home the crown of the inaugurals.

The second conference of the FBA was launched on October 23 in Marikina Sports Complex. Followed this is the appointment of their new Chief Operating Officer Claudia Perrine. The second conference was dominated by Pampanga Foton Toplanders, led by former UP player and current NCAA broadcast team analyst Mikee Reyes after they beating the Manila-NU Bulldogs in a three-game battle for the championship title.

Games was aired on AksyonTV and Net 25 on free TV, Fox Sports 1 on cable TV and internationally via AksyonTV International.

== Former teams ==
- Manila - National University Bulldogs (Team B)
- Quezon City - UP Fighting Maroons (Team B)
- Pateros - Austen Morris Associates
- Marikina - Wang's Ballclub Deliverers
- Malolos - Mighty Sports/BulSU Golden Gears
- Pampanga - Foton Toplanders
- Antipolo - Wang's Ballclub Pilgrims
- Laguna - BUSA Warriors
- Manila - Metro Racal Autocenter Artemis

== Champions ==
- 2015 Inaugural Conference: UP Fighting Maroons
- 2015 Second Conference: Pampanga Foton Toplanders

Most Valuable Player:

- 2015 Inaugural Conference:
  - Conference MVP: Levy Hernandez
  - Finals MVP: Paul Desiderio
- 2015 Second Conference:
  - Conference MVP: Levy Hernandez
  - Finals MVP: Allan Mangahas
