= Kaohsiung Municipal Kaohsiung Girls' Senior High School =

Coordinates: 22.6209°N 120.2930°E

Kaohsiung Municipal Kaohsiung Girls' Senior High School 高雄市立高雄女子高級中學

Location
- No.122, Wufu 3rd Rd., Cianjin; Kaohsiung 80148; Taiwan

Information
- Type: Public, All-Girls
- Established: 1924
- Principal: Chuan-yi Lin (林全義)
- Grades: 10~12
- Enrollment: approx. 2,700
- Campus: Urban 29,112.6 m^{2}
- Colors: Black and White
- Mascot: Zebra
- Website: KGHS website

Kaohsiung Municipal Kaohsiung Girls' Senior High School (Chinese: 高雄市立高雄女子高級中學; pinyin: Gāoxióng Shìlì Gāoxióng Nǚzǐ Gāojí Zhōngxué) abbreviated as KGHS is an all-girls high school located in Cianjin District, Kaohsiung, Taiwan.

== History ==
Japanese rule:

- 1924:Founded officially.
- 1928: The first graduation ceremony was held.

Post-war period:

- 1945:The recovery of Taiwan, 11 Tong-Jong Chen took over the Commission sent to the school to receive, temporarily principal duties, in December was ordered to be renamed the Taiwan Provincial Kaohsiung First Girls High School
- July 2009 : Lin Quanyi as the principal

== See also ==
- Secondary education in Taiwan
