= Kaohsiung Municipal Kaohsiung Senior High School =

High school in Kaohsiung, Taiwan

- 高雄市立高雄高級中學

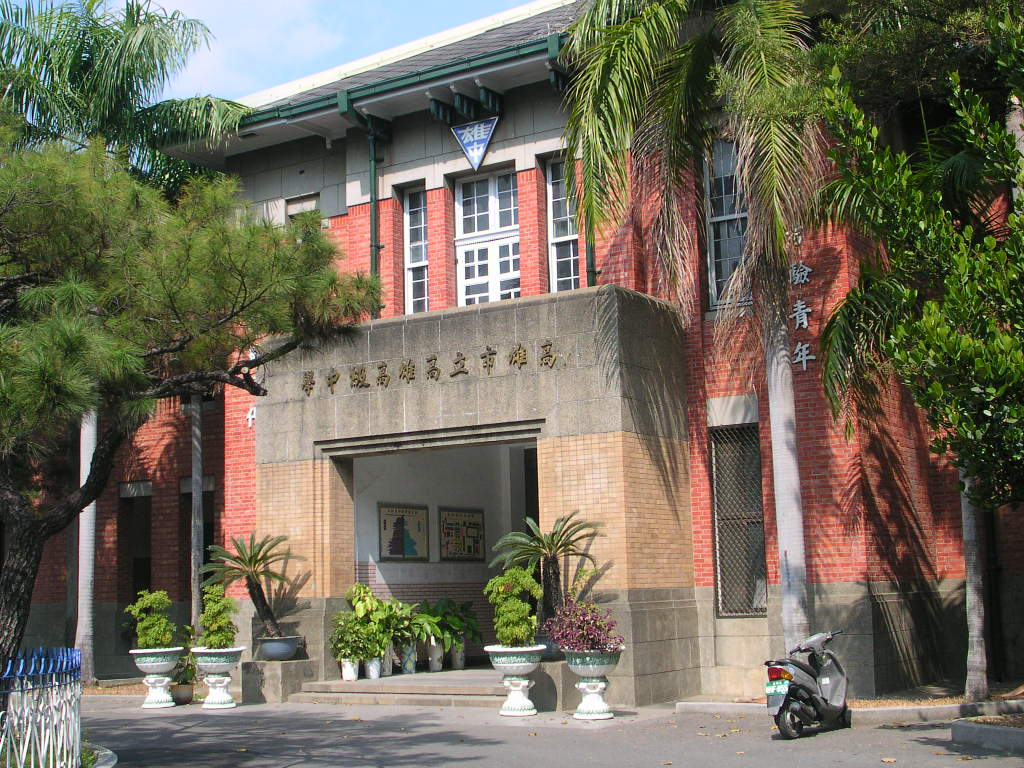
- Pictured in 2006

Location
- No. 50, Jianguo 3rd Road; Sanmin District; Kaohsiung 807302; Taiwan
- Coordinates: 22.638537°N 120.297928°E

Information
- School type: High school
- Mottoes: 自強不息 實事求是、精益求精
- Established: 1 April 1922
- Status: Active
- Sister school: NUS High School of Math and Science; Ritsumeikan Junior and Senior High School
- School number: 553301
- Principal: Chuang, Fu-Tai
- Teaching staff: 172 (as of 2019)
- Grades: 10–12
- Gender: Co-educational
- Enrollment: 2,745 (2019)
- Classes: 72 (as of 2019)
- Campus size: About 80,000 m^{2}
- Campus type: Urban
- Publication: 《雄中青年》 《紅樓心橋》 《諫燈Lighter》
- Graduates (2019): 892
- Website: www.kshs.kh.edu.tw

Kaohsiung Municipal Kaohsiung Senior High School (KSHS; Chinese: 高雄市立高雄高級中學; pinyin: Gāoxióng Shìlì Gāoxióng Gāojí Zhōngxué) is a high school in Kaohsiung, Taiwan. Formerly a boys' school, the school has offered music, gymnastics and science classes since it became co-educational in 1986. Located near the Kaohsiung Main Station, construction of the school's historic riverside campus can be dated back to the Japanese era of Taiwan.

== History ==
=== Japanese era of Taiwan ===
The school was established on 1 April 1922 in order to provide the children of Japanese officials with a proper education.

=== Kuomintang rule ===
On 25 October 1945, after the Japanese defeat in World War II, the school was reorganized into the Taiwan Provincial Kaohsiung Senior High School.

==== February 28 Incident ====
During the February 28 Incident in 1947 many rioters saw the school as a foothold to launch an assault on Kuomintang Soldiers, including the Self-Defense Forces of the school made up of students. Despite headmaster Rin Ching Yuen's dissuasion, the force was established. A cease-fire was not agreed, and commander P'eng Meng Ch'i ordered an assault on the city government, the Kaohsiung train station, and the school. Due to lack of firepower, the students were killed. The fighting devastated the already damaged equipment (during World War II), bullet holes could still be seen inside the school.

== Campus and Architecture ==
=== History of the Buildings ===
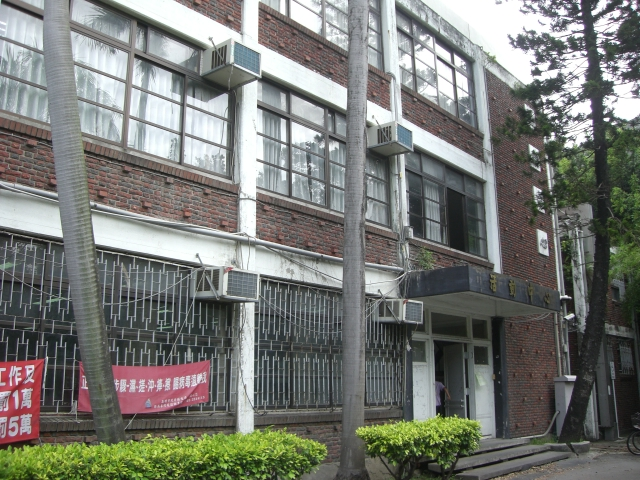
The Activity Center

In Taiwan under Japanese rule period, Japanese built "Red Buildings" with red bricks still being used today, six classroom buildings, a military building, a Gymnasium, a swimming pool and an auditorium, while most of the above also built with red bricks. After World War II, these buildings were still being used as teaching. Some parts of the structures started presenting old as time went by, thus the principal Jīa-Jì, Wáng started rebuilding or alternating some buildings, for example the 3@th, 4@th, 5@th, 6@th and 7@th teaching buildings, and also the dormitory for faculties, the musical building, the technical building, the art building and the activity center. After Huì-Mín, Xióng succeeded the principal, the Hóng-Yì building, the technical building and the physics building were erected. The dormitory for faculties built in March 1982 and located on the south west of the school once belonged to Kaohsiung Municipal Kaohsiung Industrial High School, was later transferred to Kaohsiung Municipal Kaohsiung Senior High School.

=== The KSHS Red Buildings ===
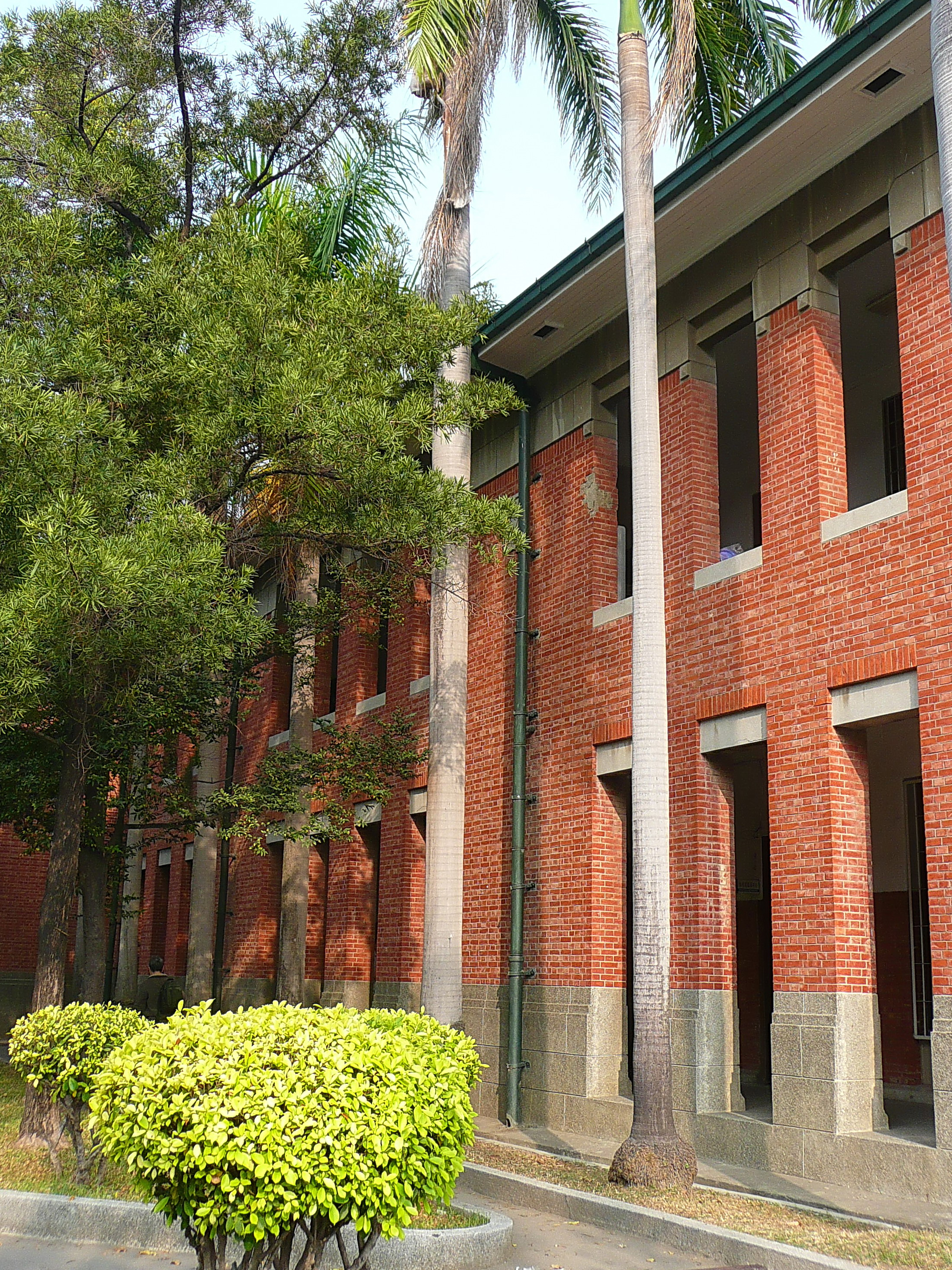
The 1st Building

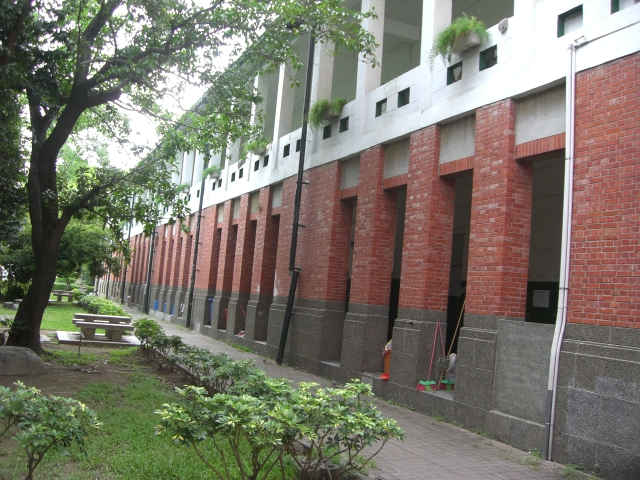
The 3rd Building

Well known as the symbol of KSHS, the red buildings (紅樓) built with red bricks is listed as "Important Historical Architecture" by Kaohsiung City Government. The main buildings are the 1@th floor of the 1@th, 2@th and the 3@th teaching buildings, while the 2@th floors are built after World War II.

The three buildings are situated parallelly and symmetrically. The space between the two buildings are garden and pond. The buildings stretch east–west and are built up high, leading to the favorable airing and lighting condition for the classrooms. The design is effected by Victorian era red-brick buildings.

== Spirit of the school ==
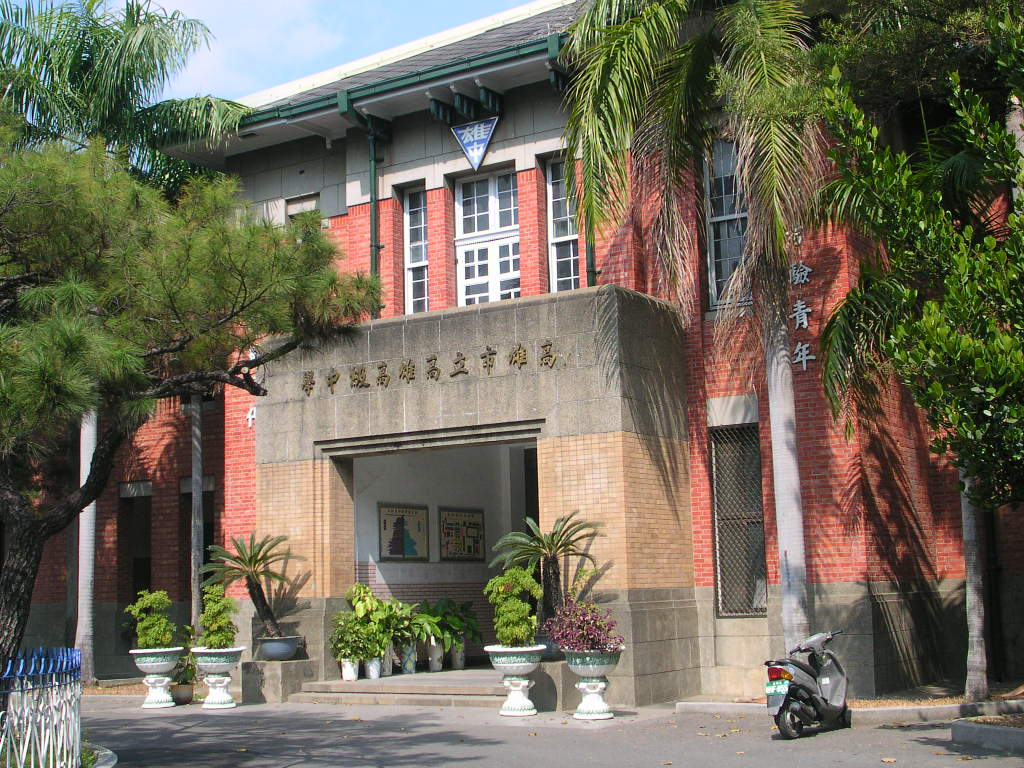
The view of the school

There used to be no united motto for the school. Until 1948, the principal Jīa-Jì, Wáng started using "Self-improvement never-ending" as the motto of the school and "Find truth in all. Strive for perfection." as the spirit of the school. Both the motto and the spirit are being printed on the East wall of the second building.

- The motto of the school: Self-improvement never-ending. (Chinese: 校訓：自強不息)
- The spirit of the school: Find truth in all. Strive for perfection. (Chinese: 精神：實事求是，精益求精)

== Activities ==
=== The KSHS and KGSH Joint Camp ===
The KSHS & KGSH Joint Camp is an annual activity held by both Kaohsiung Municipal Kaohsiung Senior High School And Kaohsiung Municipal Kaohsiung Girl's Senior High School since 1987 to 2018. It used to be held in Chengcing Lake.

== Transportation ==
The school is accessible within walking distance south west from Kaohsiung Main Station, Kaohsiung Mass Rapid Transit and Kaohsiung Bus Station, thus widely known as the center of Kaohsiung City.

== See also ==
- High school
- February 28 Incident
- Kaohsiung Municipal Kaohsiung Girls' Senior High School
- Secondary education in Taiwan
