= Mikee Reyes =

Filipino basketball player (born 1990)

Personal information
- Born: October 30, 1990 (age 35)
- Listed height: 5 ft 9 in (1.75 m)
- Listed weight: 158 lb (72 kg)

Career information
- High school: La Salle Green Hills (Mandaluyong)
- College: UP (2009–2010, 2013–2014)
- PBA draft: 2016: 5th round, 24th overall pick
- Drafted by: TNT KaTropa
- Playing career: 2016–2020
- Position: Point guard / shooting guard
- Number: 0, 3, 25

Career history
- 2016: Kaohsiung Truth
- 2017: Singapore Slingers
- 2018: Bacoor City Strikers
- 2018: Valenzuela Classic
- 2019: Bacolod Master Sardines

Miguel Antonio "Mikee" Reyes (born October 30, 1990) is a Filipino former professional basketball player who is a podcaster, media personality and sports analyst for One Sports. He was selected 24th overall by the TNT KaTropa in the 2016 PBA draft. He played college basketball for the UP Fighting Maroons.

In college, Reyes was known for his scoring. He started playing for the UP Fighting Maroons in UAAP Season 72 in the year 2009. His college career was hampered with injuries and he had to sit out for 2 consecutive years, in 2011 and 2012, after playing in his first 2 UAAP seasons. In Season 76, he rejoined the roster and played in their opening game, but left the team and did not play for the rest of the season after a disagreement with their head coach. He returned the following season and helped the Maroons end their 27-game losing streak.

After being drafted by the KaTropa, he was not signed, which led him to play in other leagues such as the ASEAN Basketball League (ABL) and the Maharlika Pilipinas Basketball League (MPBL).

He became an NCAA basketball analyst for ABS-CBN in 2015 and for GMA Network when the league moved to the network in 2020, and then a basketball analyst for One Sports. He was a sports presenter for Frontline Pilipinas from 2023 to 2024.

== Early life and high school career ==
Reyes grew up with both parents and his four sisters. His father was a former San Beda Red Lion who introduced him to basketball at a young age. He started attending basketball camps while he was in prep at Ateneo.

In high school, Reyes played for La Salle Green Hills. He had been cut from the high school varsity team of Ateneo. In 2008, he led them in a 125-point blowout win over the Mapúa Red Robins. LSGH got as far as the semis in the playoffs, where they finished 4th.

Reyes was recruited by La Salle, but decided to play for the UP Fighting Maroons instead, as the Maroons were underdogs at the time and hadn't won many games in the previous seasons. UP head coach Aboy Castro likened him to Jimmy Alapag due to his speed and good perimeter shooting.

== College career ==
In his rookie season, Reyes' season-high was 25 points in a win over the DLSU Green Archers, and he also had five rebounds and six assists in that win. That would be the last win he played in until 2014.

In 2010, Reyes had a new head coach in Ricky Dandan as Castro had coached the team to a 0–14 record. He missed two full seasons due to shoulder injuries. He returned in 2013, where in the opening game against the Adamson Falcons, Dandan benched him in the second half despite him being the starting point guard. He was then relegated to third team point guard and Dandan told him that the team "didn't need you to win". This caused him to leave the team after just one game into the season.

After leaving UP, Reyes found himself playing in the PBA D-League as part of Blackwater Sports. After Dandan was fired midway through Season 76, he wanted to return to the Maroons. He returned to the lineup for Season 77. On August 9, 2014, he scored a career-high 28 points against the Falcons and sparked a 12–0 run in the third quarter that gave UP a lead as high as 24 points. Although Adamson cut into the lead, UP still managed to pull off the win, ending a 27-game losing streak that had ongoing since 2012. This was the first win that he had played in since 2009. A bonfire celebration was held at UP Diliman's Sunken Garden after the win. The Maroons couldn't keep the momentum going in their next game, which they lost to the UE Red Warriors despite his 19 points on four triples. He then had 14 points and 22 points in UP's next two losses, which were to the UST Growling Tigers and to DLSU respectively. Against the Ateneo Blue Eagles, he scored 15 of his 19 points in the fourth quarter, but missed two free throws with less than a second remaining that could have given UP the upset win. The Falcons got their revenge on them in the final game of the season, but the Maroons still finished with higher than them in the standings, as they had a bigger winning margin over them in their first meeting. In January 2015, despite having one more playing year left, Reyes announced that he would not be returning to UP.

== Amateur career ==
Reyes played for the Pampanga Foton Tornadoes in the Filsports Basketball Association (FBA) in 2015, but it was during this time that he suffered an ACL tear. He also played for them in the Pilipinas Commercial Basketball League (PCBL).

== Professional career ==
Before applying for the PBA Draft, Reyes nearly became a MYX video jockey, but decided to pursue basketball. He declared for the 2016 PBA Draft four months in advance. He was drafted by the TNT Katropa on the day of his birthday. However, he was cut by the team and did not play for them.

=== Kaohsiung Truth ===
In 2016, Reyes was doing commentary for the ABL when he got the offer to play for the Kaohsiung Truth in the ABL. Kaohsiung then announced that he would be playing for them. On a one-game deal, he had 14 points in a nine-point loss to Alab Pilipinas, which was an improvement as Kaohsiung had been losing by an average of 17 points before his debut. His contract was not renewed after that game.

=== Singapore Slingers ===
In 2017, Reyes was signed by the Singapore Slingers for the 2017 Merlion Cup to see if he could crack their roster for the 2017–18 ABL season. He didn't make the roster for that ABL season.

=== Bacoor City Strikers ===
After his stint in the ABL, Reyes returned to broadcasting and also became a personal trainer. He also took an office job for only three months. His father Jonathan Reyes, who was coaching the Bacoor City Strikers, recruited him to join him. Since he had played for Kaohsiung even though he hadn't played in the PBA, he was classified as an ex-pro. He had 17 points and 10 assists in a come from behind victory over the Pasay Voyagers. He then had a triple-double in a win over the Caloocan Supremos with 21 points, 10 rebounds, and 15 assists. His 15 assists also tied him with Bobby Ray Parks for most assists in a single MPBL game until the record was broken by Allan Mangahas in 2019. He also became only the third player at the time in league history to record a triple-double after Parks and Andoy Estrella. His head coach then left the team after disagreements with higher management. He also left the team shortly after "out of respect" for his father.

=== Valenzuela Classic ===
Reyes was then traded to the Valenzuela Classic for Rocky Acidre. He had 12 assists in a win over the Pasig Pirates.

=== Imus Bandera ===
In 2019, Reyes joined Imus Bandera, which was coached by his father and had also recruited Jayjay Helterbrand, Gerald Anderson, Chad Alonzo, and several of his former teammates at UP. He was injured in his debut for Imus.

=== Bacolod Master Sardines ===
Reyes then played for the Bacolod Master Sardines. He scored 10 points in a loss to the GenSan Warriors. He then had 12 points in an overtime loss to the Iloilo United Royals. This would be the last pro team he played for, as he retired in 2020.

== National team career ==
In 2017, Reyes practiced with Chooks-to-Go Pilipinas, the team that would represent the Philippines in the 2017 FIBA Asia Champions Cup. He didn't make the final roster.

== Off the court ==
=== Podcasting and content creating ===
Shoot First Podcast
- Genre: Sports
- Format: Video podcast
- Country of origin: Philippines
- Language: Filipino/English

Creative team
- Created by: Mikee Reyes

Cast and voices
- Hosted by: Mikee Reyes; Javi Palaña; Juanito Gregorio; Baileys Acot; Nico Rocha; Gio Evangelista; Darwish Bederi

Production
- Length: 80–120 minutes

Publication
- No. of episodes: 300+
- Original release: September 2021
- Provider: Trypod Network

Related
- Website: https://youtube.com/@sfpod
- Years active: 2015–2019; 2021–2025
- Sports commentary career
- Genre: color commentator
- Sport: Basketball
- Employer: One Sports

After basketball, Reyes applied to become a flight attendant but failed because of a tattoo on his wrist. He was also a Grab driver for a certain period of time. Without a job due to the COVID-19 pandemic and the loss of ABS-CBN's franchise, he tried becoming a streamer of Call of Duty: Warzone. After his audience recognized him as a former UP Maroon, he did a stream where he talked about his basketball-playing days, which increased his views. This led to him to starting his own YouTube channel, where he talked about basketball, which he called MikeeTV. He then used the channel to interview basketball players and coaches (with the segments being called WRU Now? (Where Are You Now) for basketball players and Timeout for coaches). On that channel, he used to upload up to nine videos a day which he self-produced and self-edited. He then transitioned away from that format to the Shoot First podcast, where he and his co-hosts talk about current basketball topics and also some non-basketball related topics. The Shoot First title came from his reputation during his basketball-playing days.

Reyes then created his "Tito Mikee" online persona on Instagram and TikTok to show that he was more than a basketball person and to inspire his audience to pursue success. Its focus is more on lifestyle and his love life.

=== Broadcasting ===
In 2015, Reyes first started covering basketball games in the FBA, as Vince Hizon offered him the opportunity. He did two FBA games, which led to an audition to cover NCAA Season 91 basketball for ABS-CBN Sports. He passed the audition, and became one of the members of the NCAA television panel. In 2017, he also became an on-air basketball analyst for CNN Philippines. After he retired, he also covered UAAP games. In 2018, he and Kiefer Ravena co-hosted the online show Chooks-to-Go/National Basketball Training Center 24. He covered basketball for ABS-CBN Sports until 2020.

In 2021, Reyes became an NCAA analyst for GMA Network. He and his co-analysts competed on an episode of Family Feud against the hosts of Unang Hirit. He worked for GMA until the end of NCAA Season 97.

Reyes then became a basketball analyst for TV5 and its sister channel One Sports in 2022, often appearing on The Game and covering PBA games. The success of the Shoot First podcast was instrumental to him getting that job. In June 2023, he became the sports presenter for Frontline Pilipinas. He became the first fully tattooed news reporter in the Philippines. He also made appearance on Eat Bulaga! 's Gimme 5 along with his pair contestant KaladKaren, whom is his fellow segment presenter on Frontline Pilipinas and also on Bawal! Judgement Ka Ba? . He left the network until the end of 2024.

=== GOAT Academy ===
In 2020, Reyes set up the GOAT Academy, a basketball academy where college basketball players could learn from professional basketball players. He based the idea off Kobe Bryant's Mamba Sports Academy. However, the pandemic delayed the academy's opening and the academy never took off.

== Personal life ==
Reyes is currently in a relationship with CK De Leon, who is a content creator on Instagram. They run a podcast together, where they talk about careers, life advice and more. She is 10 years younger than him. Together, they are the ambassadors for TechLife Philippines. He also lives with his dog, Melo. He was in a relationship with Bea Daez, a former basketball player for the UP Lady Maroons. They had been dating since their senior year of high school.

Reyes used to be active on Twitter. He deleted his Twitter account as he wasn't making money on the platform and he was getting bashed for his opinions. He is still active on other types of social media.
