= Paul Desiderio =

Filipino basketball player (born 1997)

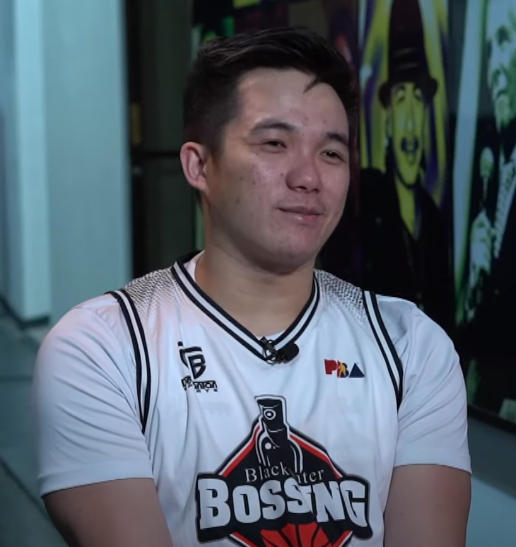
- Desiderio in 2022

No. 18 – Cebu Greats
- Title: Shooting guard
- League: MPBL

Personal information
- Born: February 2, 1997 (age 29) Liloan, Cebu, Philippines
- Listed height: 6 ft 1 in (1.85 m)
- Listed weight: 168 lb (76 kg)

Career information
- High school: UV (Cebu City)
- College: UP (2013, 2015–2018)
- PBA draft: 2018: 1st round, 4th overall pick
- Drafted by: NLEX Road Warriors
- Playing career: 2019–present
- Position: Shooting guard
- Number: 18

Career history
- 2019–2022: Blackwater Elite / Bossing
- 2023–2024: MisOr Mustangs
- 2024: Mindoro Tamaraws
- 2024–2025: Abra Weavers / Solid North Weavers
- 2025–present: Cebu Greats

Career highlights
- PBA D-League champion (2018 Foundation Cup); Filsports Basketball Association Finals MVP (2015); UAAP Mythical Team (2016)

Andres Paul C. Desiderio (born February 2, 1997) is a Filipino professional basketball player for the Cebu Greats of the Maharlika Pilipinas Basketball League (MPBL). Desiderio played college basketball for the University of the Philippines Fighting Maroons of the University Athletic Association of the Philippines (UAAP). After an illustrious college career, Desiderio was drafted 4th overall by the NLEX Road Warriors in the 2018 PBA draft before being traded to the Blackwater Bossing where he spent his entire PBA career.

== Early life and high school career ==
Desiderio was born in Liloan, Cebu. He started playing basketball at the age of eight. He also went to his father's summer league games and learned the basics of the game from the basketball clinics held every summer by Edsel Vallena and former pro Teroy Albarillo.

Desiderio played for the University of the Visayas Baby Lancers (UV) of the Cebu Schools Athletic Foundation, Inc. (CESAFI) in high school. He became Juniors MVP and made it to the Finals in 2011 against the Sacred Heart School – Ateneo de Cebu Magis Eagles. In Game 2, he and future Blackwater Bossing teammate Ron Dennison scored the final eight points to secure the win, with Desiderio finishing with 18 points. He also played in the CESAFI All-Star Games that year.

In 2012, he was given a citation by the Sportswriter's Association of Cebu (SAC).

He played in the 2013 SEAOIL NBTC Games, which showcases many players from various high schools around the country.

== College career ==
=== Dark days (2013–2014) ===
After his high school years, he joined the University of the Philippines (UP) Fighting Maroons. His first season was Season 76. They finished that season 0–14. It was also during this time that he considered transferring to the FEU Tamaraws.

Desiderio did not play in Season 77 because of his commitment to playing in the FIBA U17 World Championship and the FIBA Asia U18 Championship that year. He also skipped that season to focus on his studies. Despite his absence, the Maroons won their first game in two years.

=== Slow return to relevance (2015–2016) ===
In the preseason, Desiderio and the Maroons won the Filsports Basketball Association (FBA) championship. That momentum carried over to their first game of Season 78, which they won, 62–55, against the UE Red Warriors. They captured their second straight win in a row against the DLSU Green Archers, 71–66, with Desiderio scoring 13 points. After that start, they lost their next five games, sending them to 7th place. They were able to bounce back with a win against the Adamson Soaring Falcons. They finished the season 3–11, which was still better than its combined record from the past two UAAP seasons. In his final game of the season, Desiderio put up 26 points and 6 rebounds. Throughout that season, he never scored less than seven points a game.

The next season, Desiderio had a new head coach in Bo Perasol. In their first game of Season 79, Desiderio had 24 points, 6 rebounds, and 2 assists, but still lost due to rookie guard Jerrick Ahanmisi's debut of 28 points on 6-of-7 threes. They got their first win of the season against UE with him scoring 17 points. After a win against the Ateneo Blue Eagles, he scored 16 points in another win against Adamson. He almost had a triple-double in a win against the UST Growling Tigers, with 16 points, 13 rebounds, and 7 assists. They finished with a record of 5–9, missing the playoffs, but still their best outing since 2006. Desiderio became the first UP basketball player since Marvin Cruz to be named to the UAAP Mythical Five. His averages for that season were 15.4 points, 7.1 rebounds, and 2.6 assists.

=== 'Atin to' and return to Finals (2017–2018) ===
After playing for Café France in the off-season, Desiderio improved as a shooter. The Maroons also won two off-season tournaments. Expectations were high for him and the Maroons to finally make the Final Four. In their first game of Season 80, UST led 73–71 with 5.3 seconds left. He was heard by a live television audience saying "Atin 'to. Papasok 'to (This is ours. It will go in)," as Coach Perasol encouraged him to take the shot if he was open. He then hit the game-winning triple with 1.4 seconds left, 74–73. He finished that game with 17 points on only 6-of-20 shooting including 2-of-11 on threes. "Atin 'To" became the rallying cry for the team and for fans. A loss to Ateneo dropped them to 1–1. He had a then career-high 28 points to go along with his 10 rebounds to tow UP past UE. He broke that career-high the next game with 30 points over previous champion La Salle. For that, he won his first UAAP Player of the Week. FEU then held him to 9 points, with his former teammate Ron Dennison getting most of the credit. But in their next matchup, he hit another game-winning triple, giving UP a 5–6 record. A win against the National University Bulldogs kept their Final Four hopes alive, but a win by FEU over Adamson eliminated them from contention. His averages for that season were 16.6 points, 4.7 rebounds, and 2.2 assists.

Desiderio returned for his final year in Season 81. They started the season 1–3, then went 3–5. In a win against FEU, he finished with a new career-high of 31 points on 7-of-9 from three. A 97–81 win against La Salle ended their 21-year absence from the Final Four. Their first matchup in the Final Four was against Adamson, who held a twice-to-beat advantage over them, and had beaten twice that season. In Game 1, he had 19 points, but it was teammate import Bright Akhuetie who won the game for UP, 73–71. Desiderio set the screen on Adamson import Papi Sarr which enabled Akhuetie to hit the game-winning shot. In Game 2, Adamson sent the game into overtime. But with six seconds remaining, Desiderio hit a mid-range jumper over Sean Manganti for UP to win 89–87. The win sent UP to their first Finals since 1986. In the Finals, they faced Ateneo. Ateneo swept them in the best-of-three Finals. He averaged 13.7 points, 6.2 rebounds, 3.4 assists, and 1.3 steals in his final year. He was also named to the All-Collegiate Team. Desiderio was seen as a cult hero and one of the biggest contributors to the renaissance of UP's basketball program. After that season, he then declared for the PBA draft.

== Amateur career ==
Desiderio played for Café France in the PBA D-League Aspirants Cup. His team lost in the semifinals. In 2018, he played for Go for Gold. His team won the D-League Foundation Cup in 5 games.

== Professional career ==
=== Blackwater Elite/Bossing (2019–2022) ===
Desiderio was drafted 4th overall by the NLEX Road Warriors during the 2018 PBA draft, surprising many. Days after the draft, he was then sent to the Blackwater Elite along with Michael Miranda and Abu Tratter for big man Poy Erram and a second-round pick in a three team trade with the TNT Katropa.

In his first game for the Elite, Desiderio debuted with just five points on 2-of-6 shooting in a 117–91 loss to the Northport Batang Pier. Despite scoring just 2 points in a loss to Meralco, he had 9 rebounds. He had 12 points (9 in the fourth) in a loss to the Phoenix Fuel Masters in the 2019 Philippine Cup. He played in the Rookie-Sophomores vs Juniors game and scored 12 points. In the 2019 Governor's Cup, he had a PBA career-high of 24 points with 6 three-pointers in a 115–109 loss to NLEX.

He missed most of the 2020 Philippine Cup due to a grave leg muscle sprain and left the PBA bubble.

Desiderio got a one-year contract extension during the 2021 Governor's Cup. That conference, he had eight points in a win over the Magnolia Hotshots that ended Blackwater's 29–game losing streak.

Before the start of the 2022–23 PBA season, Desiderio suffered an injury in a tuneup game against the TNT Tropang Giga. Several days later, the injury was diagnosed to be an ACL injury, forcing him to miss that season.

On September 14, 2022, while on the unrestricted free agent with rights to salary (UFAWR2S) list of Blackwater, it was initially reported that Desiderio's rights will be traded to the NLEX Road Warriors in a three-team trade involving Blackwater, NLEX, and TNT Tropang Giga. However, the trade version that was approved on September 19 included two future draft picks, not Desiderio's rights. Shortly after the trade's approval, Desiderio announced his retirement from the PBA, citing that he is going back to his native Cebu to allow his ACL injury to heal and to start a new life.

== 3x3 career ==
On November 13, 2022, it was announced that Desiderio would be joining Talisay EGS for the 2022 Chooks-to-Go Pilipinas 3×3 Quest 2.0. His team was eliminated in the semifinals of that tournament.

In 2023, during the Al Bidda Park Challenger, Desiderio led the Manila Chooks to an upset win over Antwerp, which ranked third in the Fiba World Tour standings. However, they finished ninth in that tournament.

== PBA career statistics ==
Legend
GP	Games played	MPG	Minutes per game
FG%	Field-goal percentage	3P%	3-point field-goal percentage	FT%	Free-throw percentage
RPG	Rebounds per game	APG	Assists per game	SPG	Steals per game
BPG	Blocks per game	PPG	Points per game	**Bold**	Career high

=== Season-by-season averages ===
Year	Team	GP	MPG	FG%	3P%	FT%	RPG	APG	SPG	BPG	PPG
2019	Blackwater	**31**	16.3	.369	.286	**.667**	2.7	**1.2**	**.4**	**.1**	4.5
2020	Blackwater	5	13.5	**.667**	**.571**	.200	**3.6**	.2	**.4**	.0	5.0
2021	Blackwater	21	**17.6**	.362	.235	.526	2.7	.9	.3	**.1**	**5.7**
Career		57	16.5	.381	.275	.569	2.8	1.0	.4	.1	5.0

== National team career ==
Desiderio first played for the Philippines in the 2013 FIBA Asia U16 Championship for Men. He averaged 11 points and nearly 7 rebounds a game as the team made it all the way to the Finals, qualifying them for next year's 2014 FIBA Under-17 World Championship. In the U17 Championship, he averaged 10 points, 4.7 rebounds and nearly 3 assists in the tournament, highlighted by 25 points, 7 rebounds and 5 assists in their lone win against the United Arab Emirates (UAE). In the Asian U18 Championship, he averaged 11.4 points, 5.9 rebounds and 2.4 assists.

Desiderio was also named to the "23-for-2023" pool, which was composed of young players for the 2023 FIBA World Cup.

== Personal life ==
Desiderio was engaged to Jean Agatha Uvero, a former courtside reporter for UP. They have a daughter, Paula, and a son, Juan Andres. In 2022, the couple separated. In July 2022, Uvero accused the PBA player of physical, emotional abuse through Twitter. She stated that Desiderio strangled, punched, kicked and hit her during their relationship, even when she was pregnant with their son. The PBA then issued a statement saying that they would conduct an inquiry. Desiderio then denied these accusations.

Desiderio has several successful business ventures. He has his own Chooks-to-Go branch and he and his former fiancée opened a franchise of Kurimi Milk Tea Bar.
