= Raymar Jose =

Filipino basketball player (born 1992)

No. 24 – Meralco Bolts
- Position: Power forward
- League: PBA

Personal information
- Born: August 6, 1992 (age 34) Cebu, Philippines
- Listed height: 6 ft 4 in (1.93 m)
- Listed weight: 200 lb (91 kg)

Career information
- High school: Arellano (Pasay)
- College: FEU (2012–2016)
- PBA draft: 2017: 1st round, 3rd overall pick
- Drafted by: Blackwater Elite
- Playing career: 2016–present

Career history
- 2016–2017: Kaohsiung Truth
- 2017–2019: Blackwater Elite
- 2019–present: Meralco Bolts

Career highlights
- PBA champion (2024 Philippine); PBA D-League MVP (2017 Foundation Cup); UAAP champion (2015); UAAP Mythical Five (2016)

Raymar A. Jose (born August 6, 1992) is a Filipino professional basketball player for the Meralco Bolts of the Philippine Basketball Association (PBA). He was selected 3rd overall by Blackwater Elite in the 2017 PBA draft.

== Early life ==
Jose's love for basketball began on his barangay's basketball court in Negros Occidental, where he played against his uncles and learned how to play the sport. He then got a growth spurt in which he grew to 6'0" and started playing in basketball tournaments in Iloilo. He also tried volleyball.

Jose then moved to Manila and played for the Arellano University High School in the NCAA juniors' division in 2009, then returned to Cebu to play at Cebu Eastern College (CEC). He was set to play for CEC in the CESAFI seniors' division, but he faced eligibility issues. He tried to transfer to De La Salle University, but problems arose with his transfer. He then became a member of the FEU Tamaraws after he was recruited by then FEU head coach Bert Flores as FEU still had one more roster spot open.

== College career ==
Jose had little playing time in his first three seasons with the Tamaraws, as he was just a benchwarmer. That changed in Season 78, when he became a key role player for the Tamaraws. He had 16 points and 10 rebounds in a win over the Ateneo Blue Eagles. He then finished with 11 points and 13 rebounds in another win over the UP Fighting Maroons. At the end of the first round of eliminations, he was in the Top 10 of the MVP race. He missed some games due to an injury he suffered during warmups. The Tamaraws had a successful postseason, and won the title for Season 78.

The following season, Jose became the team captain of FEU. He also had to transition from playing at center to moving down to power forward. In the first game of Season 79, he was bothered by cramps and by Ben Mbala's defense as FEU lost a close game to the DLSU Green Archers. In a win against the UE Red Warriors, he had 11 points and 22 rebounds. The Tamaraws then overcame being down 20 points in the first quarter to beat UP, with him leading with 20 points and 12 rebounds. This was also the Tamaraw's seventh straight win. For his performance, he was awarded Player of the Week. Their streak ended with a loss to the Adamson Soaring Falcons. He then had 10 points and 15 rebounds as he tried to lead a comeback against Ateneo, but his efforts failed as Ateneo took the win. To finish the elimination round, he made the game-winning assist against the Red Warriors. He was awarded a spot on the Mythical Team, as he was the only local to average a double-double. In Game 1 of their Final Four series against Ateneo, he led the team with 20 points and a career-high 23 rebounds as FEU extended the series. Ateneo bounced back in Game 2 however, and FEU's season was ended. With the loss, Jose's collegiate career ended as well.

== Professional career ==
=== Kaoshiung Truth (2016–2017) ===
On December 10, 2016, Jose, along with FEU Tamaraw teammate Achie Iñigo, signed with the Kaohsiung Truth of the ASEAN Basketball League (ABL) on a one-game contract. He made his debut in a loss against San Miguel Alab Pilipinas with 12 points and seven rebounds but fouled out of the game. After the game, their contracts were extended for the rest of the season. He contributed 12 points in Kaoshiung's first win of the season. In a blowout win over the Westsports Malaysia Dragons, he had 17 points on 8-of-12 shooting. They beat the Dragons again, this time with him scoring 22 points. With a team that was mostly inexperienced, Kaoshiung ended the season with the worse record in the league, 5–15, and didn't qualify for the playoffs. They also finished with the worst defense in the league.

=== Blackwater Elite (2017–2019) ===
After spending time with the Philippine national team and in the PBA D-League, Jose applied for the 2017 PBA Draft. He was then selected with the 3rd overall pick by the Blackwater Elite. He then agreed to a three-year, P8.5 million contract with the team. In his PBA debut, he had 16 points, six rebounds, and two assists with no turnovers and only one missed free throw as he played 22 minutes in a loss. After getting taunted by Beau Belga of the Rain or Shine Elasto Painters, he went on to score 12 points and eight rebounds and claim the win over the E-Painters. He had 14 points and nine rebounds in a loss to the NLEX Road Warriors. He also joined the team in competing in the Summer Super 8, an Asian invitational tournament. Although the Elite failed to make the semifinals, he was able to average 14.3 points and 6.3 rebounds throughout the tournament.

In the 2019 Philippine Cup, Jose had a double-double of 15 points and 10 rebounds in a loss. He was ejected for tossing the ball which accidentally hit TNT KaTropa's Roger Pogoy in the jaw, who was his good friend and former teammate at FEU. As a result, he had to pay a fine of P20,000, but Pogoy paid half of his fine. He also participated in the Rookies-Sophomores vs. Juniors Game during the 2019 PBA All-Star Weekend. He missed all of the 2019 Commissioner's Cup due to vertigo.

=== Meralco Bolts (2019–present) ===
On October 25, 2019, Jose, along with Allein Maliksi, was traded to the Meralco Bolts for Mike Tolomia, KG Canaleta, and two second-round draft picks in 2020 and 2022. He only had few minutes of playing time in his first two seasons with Meralco, but still was given a one-year contract extension.

Jose missed some games during the 2021 Philippine Cup due to being placed under the league's health and safety protocols. Near the end of Game 1 of the Governors' Cup Finals against Barangay Ginebra, he got into an altercation against Arvin Tolentino, which continued after the game. Both were summoned to Commissioner Willie Marcial's office but no sanctions were given as the two of them patched things up between them. Ginebra went on to win the Finals in six games.

After the Finals, Jose shed 15 kilos through his no-rice diet as he wanted to extend his career. The effects were seen during the 2022 Philippine Cup, in which he scored nine points and 13 rebounds in a win over the NorthPort Batang Pier. In a Game 1 loss of their semifinals series against the San Miguel Beermen, he contributed 12 points and six rebounds. In Game 2, he scored 10 of his 13 points in the fourth quarter as Meralco evened the series. San Miguel would eventually win the series in seven games.

== Career statistics ==
Legend
GP	Games played	MPG	Minutes per game	FG%	Field-goal percentage
3FG%	3-point field-goal percentage	4P%	4-point field-goal percentage	FT%	Free-throw percentage
RPG	Rebounds per game	APG	Assists per game	SPG	Steals per game
BPG	Blocks per game	PPG	Points per game	127	Career high

=== College ===
==== Elimination rounds ====
Year	Team	GP	MPG	FG%	3P%	FT%	RPG	APG	SPG	BPG	PPG
2012-13	FEU	3	1.7	.250	—	—	.3	.3	—	—	.7
2013-14	FEU	13	6.1	.529	—	.429	1.0	—	—	.1	1.6
2014-15	FEU	13	11.1	.618	—	.609	2.0	.5	.1	.2	4.3
2015-16	FEU	12	21.2	.569	—	.577	8.8	1.1	.3	—	8.1
2016-17	FEU	14	27.6	.363	.133	.525	11.0	1.4	.6	.1	11.1
Career		55	15.8	.451	.133	.548	5.5	.7	.2	.1	6.0

==== Playoffs ====
Year	Team	GP	MPG	FG%	3P%	FT%	RPG	APG	SPG	BPG	PPG
2013-14	FEU	1	5.0	.500	—	—	2.0	—	—	—	2.0
2014-15	FEU	6	16.3	.500	—	.500	4.2	.2	—	.7	4.7
2015-16	FEU	4	20.5	.563	—	.222	6.0	.8	—	.3	5.0
2016-17	FEU	2	32.3	.579	.000	.588	17.5	1.0	—	—	16.0
Career		13	19.2	.540	.000	.467	6.6	.5	—	.4	6.3

=== ABL ===
Year	Team	GP	MPG	FG%	3P%	FT%	RPG	APG	SPG	BPG	PPG
2016-17	Kaohsiung Truth	17	21.6	.503	.111	.651	4.8	.7	.5	.0	10.7
Career		17	21.6	.503	.111	.651	4.8	.7	.5	.0	10.7

=== PBA ===
As of the end of 2025–26 season

Year	Team	GP	MPG	FG%	3P%	4P%	FT%	RPG	APG	SPG	BPG	PPG
2017–18	Blackwater	33	13.1	.387	.267	—	.672	3.7	.7	.2	.0	5.4
2019	Blackwater	21	7.0	.400	.250	—	.600	2.0	.4	.2	—	2.4
2019	Meralco	21	7.0	.400	.250	—	.600	2.0	.4	.2	—	2.4
2020	Meralco	9	9.5	.286	.000	—	.643	2.2	.2	.1	.1	1.9
2021	Meralco	9	4.8	.500	—	—	.833	1.3	.1	—	—	1.2
2022–23	Meralco	42	8.3	.404	.286	—	.765	3.0	.2	.1	.1	2.9
2023–24	Meralco	11	10.2	.467	.000	—	1.000	2.5	.6	.1	.2	2.9
2024–25	Meralco	23	11.2	.505	.143	—	.667	3.6	.5	.0	.0	5.0
2025–26	Meralco	9	8.5	.407	.400	—	.667	1.9	.6	.1	—	2.9
Career		157	9.6	.419	.226	—	.701	2.8	.4	.1	.1	3.5

== National team career ==
In 2016, Jose, along with some of his FEU teammates, joined the Gilas Cadets for the 2016 SEABA Cup. He contributed a near double-double of nine points and 15 rebounds in an opening win against Malaysia. Gilas then went on to win the tournament.

The following year, Jose joined the national team in competing in the 2017 Jones Cup. He was also part of the team for the 2017 SEA Games. He topscored for the team with 22 points off the bench in a 95-point win over Myanmar. Gilas then got its 18th gold medal, and he got his first SEA Game gold medal. He was also part of the team that played in the 2017 FIBA Asia Champions Cup.
