= 2017–18 San Miguel Alab Pilipinas season =

- Head coach: (Philippines) Jimmy Alapag
- Owner(s): Charlie Dy

ABL 2017-2018 season results
- Record: 14–6 (.700)
- Place: 3rd
- Playoff finish: Champions (Defeated Mono Vampire, 3–2)

San Miguel Alab Pilipinas seasons

The 2017–18 San Miguel Alab Pilipinas season is the 2nd season of the franchise in the ASEAN Basketball League (ABL).

== Roster ==
San Miguel Alab Pilipinas roster
Players
Coaches

| Pos. | No. | Nat. | Name | Ht. | Wt. | DOB (YYYY-MM-DD) | From |
|---|---|---|---|---|---|---|---|
| G | 0 | (Philippines) | Raymundo, John | 1.78 m (5 ft 10 in) | 77 kg (170 lb) | 37 – 30 May 1989 | San Sebastian |
| G | 1 | (Philippines) (United States) | Parks, Bobby Jr. | 1.93 m (6 ft 4 in) | 98 kg (216 lb) | 33 – 19 February 1993 | National-U |
| G | 2 | (Philippines) | Urbiztondo, Josh | 1.83 m (6 ft 0 in) | 75 kg (165 lb) | 43 – 27 February 1983 | Fresno Pacific |
| F | 3 | (Philippines) (United States) | Domingo, Lawrence (AI) | 1.96 m (6 ft 5 in) | 102 kg (225 lb) | 37 – 11 April 1989 | Eastern New Mexico |
| F | 6 | (Philippines) | Alabanza, John Ray | | | | UE |
| F | 8 | (Philippines) | Celiz, Robby | 1.91 m (6 ft 3 in) | 98 kg (216 lb) | 38 – 7 September 1988 | National-U |
| F | 10 | (Philippines) | Maierhofer, Rico | 1.98 m (6 ft 6 in) | 79 kg (174 lb) | 40 – 4 November 1985 | De La Salle |
| G | 13 | (Philippines) | Javelona, Paolo | 1.83 m (6 ft 0 in) | 77 kg (170 lb) | 34 – 25 October 1992 | National-U |
| G/F | 24 | (Philippines) | Sumalinog, Chris | 1.91 m (6 ft 3 in) | 85 kg (187 lb) | 37 – 11 July 1989 | Ateneo |
| G/F | 25 | (Philippines) | Hontiveros, Dondon | 1.88 m (6 ft 2 in) | 79 kg (174 lb) | 49 – 1 June 1977 | Cebu |
| F | 32 | (United States) | Brownlee, Justin (WI) | 2.01 m (6 ft 7 in) | 99 kg (218 lb) | 38 – 23 April 1988 | St. John's |
| F/C | 34 | (Puerto Rico) | Balkman, Renaldo (WI) | 2.03 m (6 ft 8 in) | 95 kg (209 lb) | 42 – 14 June 1984 | South Carolina |

Head coach

- (Philippines) Jimmy Alapag

Assistant coach(es)

- (Philippines) Mac Cuan
- (Philippines) Danny Seigle

Team manager

- (Philippines) Charlie Dy
- (Philippines) Dondon Monteverde

Legend

- (C) Team captain
- (WI) World import
- (AI) ASEAN heritage import
- Injured

== Standing ==
=== Elimination ===
| Pos | Team | Pld | W | L | PF | PA | PD | PCT | GB | Qualification |
|---|---|---|---|---|---|---|---|---|---|---|
| 1 | (China) Chong Son Kung Fu | 20 | 15 | 5 | 1864 | 1638 | +226 | .750 | — | Semi-finals |
| 2 | Hong Kong Eastern | 20 | 14 | 6 | 1949 | 1856 | +93 | .700 (Note: Head-to-head record: Hong Kong Eastern 3–1; San Miguel Alab Pilipinas 2–2; Mono Vampire 1–3) | 1 | Semi-finals |
| 3 | (Philippines) San Miguel Alab Pilipinas | 20 | 14 | 6 | 1844 | 1681 | +163 | .700 | 1 | Quarter-finals |
| 4 | (Thailand) Mono Vampire | 20 | 14 | 6 | 2024 | 1957 | +67 | .700 | 1 | Quarter-finals |
| 5 | Singapore Slingers | 20 | 12 | 8 | 1651 | 1598 | +53 | .600 | 3 | Quarter-finals |
| 6 | (Vietnam) Saigon Heat | 20 | 10 | 10 | 1963 | 1956 | +7 | .500 | 5 | Quarter-finals |
| 7 | CLS Knights Indonesia | 20 | 5 | 15 | 1614 | 1733 | −119 | .250 (Note: Head-to-head record: CLS Knights Indonesia 2–0; Westports Malaysia Dragons 0–2) | 10 | |
| 8 | Westports Malaysia Dragons | 20 | 5 | 15 | 1802 | 1974 | −172 | .250 | 10 | |
| 9 | (Chinese Taipei) Formosa Dreamers | 20 | 1 | 19 | 1593 | 1901 | −308 | .050 | 14 | |

Source: ASEANBasketballLeague.com

== Game log ==
2017–18 game log
Total: 14–6
November : 0–2 (Home: 0–2; Road: 0–0)

| Game | Date | Team | Score | High points | High rebounds | High assists | Location Attendance | Record |
|---|---|---|---|---|---|---|---|---|
| 1 | November 19 | Hong Kong Eastern Basketball Team | L 89–92 Archived 2018-01-04 at the Wayback Machine | Reggie Okosa (28) | Ivan Johnson (15) | Ivan Johnson (3) | Mall of Asia Arena | 0–1 |
| 2 | November 29 | Singapore Slingers | L 83–97 Archived 2018-01-15 at the Wayback Machine | Reggie Okosa (24) | Reggie Okosa (10) | Parks Jr., Johnson (4) | Sta. Rosa Arena | 0–2 |

December : 1–1 (Home: 0–0; Road: 1–1)

| Game | Date | Team | Score | High points | High rebounds | High assists | Location Attendance | Record |
|---|---|---|---|---|---|---|---|---|
| 3 | December 13 | Hong Kong Eastern Basketball Team | L 96–99 Archived 2018-01-14 at the Wayback Machine | Ivan Johnson (32) | Reggie Okosa (13) | Parks Jr. (10) | Southorn Stadium | 0–3 |
| 4 | December 16 | Formosa Dreamers | W 78–61 Archived 2017-12-22 at the Wayback Machine | Reggie Okosa (19) | Reggie Okosa (19) | Josh Urbiztondo (7) | Changhua Stadium | 1–3 |

January : 6–1 (Home: 2–1; Road: 4–0)

| Game | Date | Team | Score | High points | High rebounds | High assists | Location Attendance | Record |
|---|---|---|---|---|---|---|---|---|
| 5 | January 3 | Westports Malaysia Dragons | W 90–79 Archived 2018-01-03 at the Wayback Machine | Justin Brownlee (29) | Renaldo Balkman (11) | Josh Urbiztondo (9) | Filoil Flying V Centre | 2–3 |
| 6 | January 7 | Singapore Slingers | W 89–80 Archived 2018-01-08 at the Wayback Machine | Renaldo Balkman (26) | Renaldo Balkman (8) | Justin Brownlee (8) | OCBC Arena | 3–3 |
| 7 | January 10 | Singapore Slingers | L 80–90 Archived 2018-02-02 at the Wayback Machine | Renaldo Balkman (24) | Renaldo Balkman (12) | Bobby Ray Parks Jr. (4) | Filoil Flying V Centre | 3–4 |
| 8 | January 14 | Mono Vampire Basketball Club | W 114–87 Archived 2018-02-02 at the Wayback Machine | Justin Brownlee (29) | Rico Maierhofer (8) | Justin Brownlee (9) | Stadium 29 | 4–4 |
| 9 | January 20 | CLS Knights Indonesia | W 92–87 Archived 2018-02-02 at the Wayback Machine | Justin Brownlee (36) | Renaldo Balkman (13) | Justin Brownlee (7) | GOR CLS Kertajaya | 5–4 |
| 10 | January 28 | Saigon Heat | W 95-87 | Renaldo Balkman (26) | Renaldo Balkman (20) | Renaldo Balkman (6) | CIS Arena Saigon | 6–4 |
| 11 | January 31 | Nanhai Kung Fu | W 94–91 Archived 2018-02-02 at the Wayback Machine | Bobby Ray Parks Jr. (31) | Renaldo Balkman (16) | Justin Brownlee (6) | Sta. Rosa Arena | 7–4 |

February : 4–0 (Home: 2–0; Road: 2–0)

| Game | Date | Team | Score | High points | High rebounds | High assists | Location Attendance | Record |
|---|---|---|---|---|---|---|---|---|
| 12 | February 4 | Singapore Slingers | W 82–69 Archived 2018-02-07 at the Wayback Machine | Renaldo Balkman (21) | Justin Brownlee (10) | Bobby Ray Parks (4) | OCBC Arena (2,800) | 8–4 |
| 13 | February 7 | Mono Vampire | W 86–84 Archived 2018-02-08 at the Wayback Machine | Renaldo Balkman (31) | Renaldo Balkman (13) | Justin Brownlee (8) | Baliwag Star Arena | 9–4 |
| 14 | February 11 | CLS Knights | W 80–73 Archived 2018-03-15 at the Wayback Machine | Renaldo Balkman (36) | Brownlee, Domingo (12) | Justin Brownlee (9) | GOR CLS Kertajaya | 10–4 |
| 15 | February 18 | Formosa Dreamers | W 117–93 Archived 2018-03-15 at the Wayback Machine | Justin Brownlee (27) | Renaldo Balkman (14) | Josh Urbiztondo (7) | Sta. Rosa Arena | 11–4 |

March : 3–2 (Home: 2–0; Road: 1–2)

| Game | Date | Team | Score | High points | High rebounds | High assists | Location Attendance | Record |
|---|---|---|---|---|---|---|---|---|
| 16 | March 4 | Westports Malaysia Dragons | L 89–90 Archived 2018-03-15 at the Wayback Machine | Renaldo Balkman (33) | Renaldo Balkman (19) | Justin Brownlee (7) | MABA Stadium | 11–5 |
| 17 | March 11 | Chong Son Kung Fu | L 79–92 Archived 2018-03-15 at the Wayback Machine | Renaldo Balkman (29) | Renaldo Balkman (8) | Justin Brownlee (5) | Nanhai Gymnasium | 11–6 |
| 18 | March 14 | Saigon Heat | W 126–100 Archived 2018-03-15 at the Wayback Machine | Renaldo Balkman (30) | Justin Brownlee (13) | Brownlee, Javelona (4) | USEP Gymnasium & Cultural Center Davao | 12–6 |
| 19 | March 21 | CLS Knights Indonesia | W 84–67 Archived 2018-04-13 at the Wayback Machine | Bobby Ray Parks Jr. (21) | Lawrence Domingo (12) | Brownlee, Balkman (5) | Baliuag Star Arena | 13–6 |
| 20 | March 25 | CLS Knights Indonesia | W 101–63 Archived 2018-04-13 at the Wayback Machine | Pamboy Raymundo (20) | Paolo Javelona (10) | Parks, Brownlee (6) | Sta. Rosa Arena | 14–6 |

== Playoffs ==
Quarterfinals
4 (Thailand) Mono Vampire | 2
5 Singapore Slingers | 0
3 (Philippines) San Miguel Alab Pilipinas | 2
6 (Vietnam) Saigon Heat | 0

Semifinals
1 (China) Chong Son Kung Fu | 0
4 (Thailand) Mono Vampire | 2
2 Hong Kong Eastern | 0
3 (Philippines) San Miguel Alab Pilipinas | 2

Finals
4 (Thailand) Mono Vampire | 2
3 (Philippines) San Miguel Alab Pilipinas | 3

=== Game log ===
2018 playoff game log
Total: 4–0
Quarterfinals : 2–0 (Home: 1–0; Road: 1–0)

| Game | Date | Team | Score | High points | High rebounds | High assists | Location Attendance | Series |
|---|---|---|---|---|---|---|---|---|
| 1 | April 1 | Saigon Heat | W 110–100 Archived 2018-04-05 at the Wayback Machine | Bobby Ray Parks Jr. 24 | Renaldo Balkman 20 | Justin Brownlee 8 | Filoil Flying V Centre, San Juan | 1–0 |
| 2 | April 7 | Saigon Heat | W 96–85 Archived 2018-04-08 at the Wayback Machine | Balkman, Domingo 21 | Justin Brownlee 13 | Paolo Javelona 4 | CIS Arena, Ho Chi Minh City | 2–0 |

Semifinals : 2–0 (Home: 1–0; Road: 1–0)

| Game | Date | Team | Score | High points | High rebounds | High assists | Location Attendance | Series |
|---|---|---|---|---|---|---|---|---|
| 1 | April 11 | Hong Kong Eastern | W 98–94 | Renaldo Balkman 46 | Renaldo Balkman 14 | Justin Brownlee 9 | Southorn Stadium, Wan Chai | 1–0 |
| 2 | April 15 | Hong Kong Eastern | W 79–72 Archived 2018-04-18 at the Wayback Machine | Justin Brownlee 22 | Bobby Ray Parks Jr. 13 | Bobby Ray Parks Jr. 5 | Santa Rosa Multi-Purpose Complex, Santa Rosa | 2–0 |

Finals : 3–2 (Home: 2–1; Road: 1–1)

| Game | Date | Team | Score | High points | High rebounds | High assists | Location Attendance | Series |

== Transactions ==
=== Recruited imports ===
| Season | Name | Debuted | Last game | Record | Source |
|---|---|---|---|---|---|
| 2017-18 | (Nigeria) Reggie Okosa | November 19, 2017 | December 16, 2017 | 1–3 | |
| 2017-18 | (United States) Ivan Johnson | November 19, 2017 | December 16, 2017 | 1–3 | |
| 2017-18 | (United States) Justin Brownlee | January 3, 2018 | May 2, 2018 | 20-5 | |
| 2017-18 | (Puerto Rico) Renaldo Balkman | January 3, 2018 | May 2, 2018 | 20-5 | |
