= 2018 ABL playoffs =

Tournament details
- Dates: April 1–May 2, 2018
- Season: 2017–18
- Teams: 6

Final positions
- Champions: (Philippines) San Miguel Alab Pilipinas (1st title)
- Runner-up: (Thailand) Mono Vampire
- Semifinalists: Chong Son Kung Fu; Hong Kong Eastern

The 2018 ABL playoffs is the postseason tournament concluding the 2017–18 season of the ASEAN Basketball League (ABL). The top two teams that had the best regular-season records qualified directly to the semifinals, while the third to sixth best teams faced each other in the quarterfinals. The quarterfinals and the semifinals are a best-of-three series, while the finals is a best-of-five series. The higher-seed team holds the home court advantage, hosting games 1 and 3 in the semifinals, and games 1, 2 and 5 in the finals.

== Qualified teams ==
1. Hong Kong Eastern
2. Chong Son Kung Fu
3. San Miguel Alab Pilipinas
4. Mono Vampire
5. Singapore Slingers
6. Saigon Heat

== Bracket ==
Quarterfinals
4 (Thailand) Mono Vampire	2
5 Singapore Slingers	0
3 (Philippines) San Miguel Alab Pilipinas	2
6 (Vietnam) Saigon Heat	0

Semifinals
1 (China) Chong Son Kung Fu	0
4 (Thailand) Mono Vampire	2
2 Hong Kong Eastern	0
3 (Philippines) San Miguel Alab Pilipinas	2

Finals
4 (Thailand) Mono Vampire	2
3 (Philippines) San Miguel Alab Pilipinas	3

== Quarterfinals ==
=== Alab vs. Saigon ===
- All times local; UTC+8 for the Philippines and UTC+7 for Vietnam.

1 April
8:00 p.m.

Box score

San Miguel Alab Pilipinas (Philippines)	110–100	(Vietnam) Saigon Heat
Scoring by quarter: 30–24, 27–23, 33–25, 20–28
Pts: Parks 24; Rebs: Balkman 20; Asts: Brownlee 8		Pts: Esho 42; Rebs: Esho 11; Asts: Williams 5
Alab leads series, 1–0

Filoil Flying V Centre, San Juan
Referees: Budi Marfan (INA), Suebpong Wichaipin (THA), Leong Chuen Wing (SIN)

7 April
7:00 p.m.

Box score

Saigon Heat (Vietnam)	85–96	(Philippines) San Miguel Alab Pilipinas
Scoring by quarter: 27–28, 15–18, 17–27, 26–23
Pts: Scott 22; Rebs: Morgan 7 Asts: Morgan 5		Pts: Balkman, Domingo 21; Rebs: Brownlee 13; Asts: Javelona 4
Alab wins series, 2–0

CIS Arena, Ho Chi Minh City
Referees: Goh Poh Seng (SIN), Johan Christiana (INA), Preeda Muongmee (THA)

=== Mono vs. Singapore ===
- All times local; UTC+8 for Singapore, and UTC+7 for Thailand

6 April
3:30 p.m.

Box score

Mono Vampire (Thailand)	85–82	Singapore Slingers
Scoring by quarter: 23–24, 21–24, 18–13, 23–21
Pts: Deguara 21; Rebs: Singletary 9 Asts: Brickman 12		Pts: Charles 26; Rebs: Charles 23; Asts: Alexander 8
Mono leads series, 1–0

Stadium 29, Nonthaburi
Referees: Chan Owe Shiong (MAS), Ho Chang-jen (TPE), Reynante Hufana (PHI)

8 April
4:00 p.m.

Box score

Singapore Slingers	82–85	(Thailand) Mono Vampire
Scoring by quarter: 18–16, 16–21, 27–21, 21–27
Pts: Alexander 25; Rebs: Alexander, Goh 8 Asts: Alexander 7		Pts: Singletary 29; Rebs: Deguara 17; Asts: Brickman 7
Mono wins series, 2–0

OCBC Arena, Kallang
Referees: Michael Tolentino (PHI), Tee Yong Sern (MAS), Chu Wei Chuen (MAS)

== Semifinals ==
=== Chong Son vs. Mono ===
- All times local; UTC+8 for China, and UTC+7 for Thailand

11 April
7:30 p.m.

Box score

Chong Son Kung Fu (China)	94–103	(Thailand) Mono Vampire
Scoring by quarter: 27–19, 18–37, 21–25, 28–22
Pts: McKinney 32; Rebs: Tucker 13; Asts: Tucker 7		Pts: Singletary 29; Rebs: Deguara 13; Asts: Brickman 15
Mono leads series, 1–0

Nanhai Gymnasium, Foshan
Referees: Andy Cheung (HKG), Yuen Chun Yip (HKG), Allan Cheong (SIN)

18 April
1:00 p.m.

Box score

Mono Vampire (Thailand)	83–80	(China) Chong Son Kung Fu
Scoring by quarter: 26–16, 18–19, 9–25, 30–20
Pts: Brickman, Singletary 23; Rebs: Deguara 19; Asts: Brickman 9		Pts: Howard 25; Rebs: Howard 15; Asts: Tucker 6
Mono wins series, 2–0

Stadium 29, Nonthaburi
Referees: Johan Christiana (INA), Leong Chuen Wing (SIN), Lim Wee Chun (MAS)

=== Eastern vs. Alab ===
- All times local, at UTC+8.

11 April
8:00 p.m.

Box score

Hong Kong Eastern	94–98	(Philippines) San Miguel Alab Pilipinas
Scoring by quarter: 25–14, 18–36, 19–25, 32–23
Pts: Lamb 32; Rebs: Standhardinger 15; Asts: Elliott 10		Pts: Balkman 46; Rebs: Balkman 14; Asts: Brownlee 9
Alab leads series, 1–0

Southorn Stadium, Wan Chai
Referees: Budi Marfan (INA), Chen Ying-cheng (TPE), Suebpong Wichaiphin (THA)

15 April
8:00 p.m.

Box score

San Miguel Alab Pilipinas (Philippines)	79–72	Hong Kong Eastern
Scoring by quarter: 16–16, 21–16, 23–17, 19–23
Pts: Brownlee 22; Rebs: Parks 13; Asts: Parks 5		Pts: Elliott 25; Rebs: Moss 16; Asts: Elliott, Lee 3
Alab wins series, 2–0

City of Santa Rosa Multi-Purpose Complex, Santa Rosa
Referees: Goh Poh Seng (SIN), Nattapong Jontapa (THA), Haryanto Sutario (INA)

== Finals ==
- All times local; UTC+8 for the Philippines, and UTC+7 for Thailand

22 April
8:00 p.m.

Box score

San Miguel Alab Pilipinas (Philippines)	143–130 (OT)	(Thailand) Mono Vampire
Scoring by quarter: 26–32, 33–26, 28–29, 34–34, Overtime: 22–9
Alab leads series, 1–0

City of Santa Rosa Multi-Purpose Complex, Santa Rosa

25 April
8:00 p.m.

Box score

San Miguel Alab Pilipinas (Philippines)	100–103	(Thailand) Mono Vampire
Scoring by quarter: 20–24, 25–28, 28–26, 27–25
Series tied, 1–1

City of Santa Rosa Multi-Purpose Complex, Santa Rosa

28 April
3:30 p.m.

Box score

Mono Vampire (Thailand)	93–99	(Philippines) San Miguel Alab Pilipinas
Scoring by quarter: 20–22, 30–26, 17–27, 26–24
Alab leads series, 2–1

Stadium 29, Nonthaburi

30 April
3:30 p.m.

Box score

Mono Vampire (Thailand)	88–83	(Philippines) San Miguel Alab Pilipinas
Scoring by quarter: 23–18, 22–24, 24–27, 19–14
Series tied, 2–2

Stadium 29, Nonthaburi

2 May
8:00 p.m.

Box score

San Miguel Alab Pilipinas (Philippines)	102–92	(Thailand) Mono Vampire
Scoring by quarter: 27–14, 27–31, 28–16, 20–31
Alab wins series, 3–2

City of Santa Rosa Multi-Purpose Complex, Santa Rosa
