= Pamboy Raymundo =

Filipino basketball player

No. 0 – Biñan Tatak Gel
- Position: Point guard
- League: MPBL

Personal information
- Born: May 30, 1989 (age 37) San Juan, Philippines
- Listed height: 5 ft 10 in (1.78 m)
- Listed weight: 170 lb (77 kg)

Career information
- College: San Sebastian
- PBA draft: 2011: 2nd round, 12th overall pick
- Drafted by: Talk 'N Text Tropang Texters
- Playing career: 2011–present

Career history
- 2011–2013: Talk 'N Text Tropang Texters
- 2013: Air21 Express
- 2014–2015: NLEX Road Warriors
- 2017–2018: San Miguel Alab Pilipinas
- 2018–2019: Bataan Risers
- 2019–2020: GenSan Warriors
- 2021: Clarin Sto. Niño
- 2021: GenSan Warriors
- 2022–2023: Nueva Ecija Capitals / Rice Vanguards
- 2023–present: Biñan Tatak Gel

Career highlights
- ABL champion (2018); MPBL champion (2022); All-MPBL Second Team (2020); PBA D-League Aspirant's Cup champion (2014, 2017); PBA D-League Foundation Cup champion (2017); NCAA champion (2009)

John Murphy "Pamboy" Raymundo (born May 30, 1989) is a Filipino professional basketball player for the Biñan Tatak Gel of the Maharlika Pilipinas Basketball League (MPBL). He was drafted 12th overall in 2011 by the Talk 'N Text Tropang Texters. He also played in the ASEAN Basketball League (ABL).

== Early life ==
Raymundo started playing basketball at the age of seven. He made it to his high school's basketball varsity team as a sophomore. His team played in the NCR meet, where he was noticed by college scouts, and renowned coach Edmundo "Ato" Badolato, who tried to recruit him for San Beda's high school team. He also participated in the 2005 Nike All-Asia Camp, along with Gian Chiu, and played against future NBA player Patty Mills.

== College career ==
Raymundo played for the San Sebastian College-Recoletos Men's Senior Basketball team from 2006 to 2010. In 2009, he was one of the members of the San Sebastian Stags who won the title against then three-time defending champions San Beda Red Lions in a sweep 2–0.

== PBA and PBA D-League career ==
=== Talk 'N Text Tropang Texters ===
In the 2011 PBA Draft, Raymundo was drafted 12th overall by the Tropang Texters. He won back to back Philippine Cup titles with the team. During the 2012 Commissioner's Cup finals, he was fined 40,000 pesos and suspended for game 5 of that finals for exchanging elbows with Josh Urbiztondo and punching Joe Devance in the back of the neck. He also participated in the Obstacle Challenge of the 2013 PBA All-Star Weekend. After two years, he was traded to the Air 21 Express in a three-team, multi-player trade.

=== Air21 Express ===
After the trade, his contract was not renewed, so he never got to play for Air21.

=== NLEX Road Warriors (D-League) ===
Raymundo attempted to return to the PBA through the PBA D-League. His team made it to the Aspirant Cup finals that year, and won the title.

=== NLEX Road Warriors ===
After a stint in the PBA D-League, Raymundo returned to the PBA for the NLEX Road Warriors. He played two seasons for them.

=== Cignal-San Beda Hawkeyes ===
Raymundo scored 17 points to lead the Hawkeyes to a finals spot. There, the Hawkeyes won their first D-League championship. They won again in that year's Foundation Cup.

== ABL career ==
Raymundo joined the ABL team Alab Pilipinas. He scored 20 points on 3-of-3 shooting from three in a win over the CLS Knights. His team won the 2017–18 title over the Mono Vampire. The team failed to defend the title the following season, losing to the Hong Kong Eastern Basketball in the quarterfinals.

== MPBL career ==
=== Bataan Risers ===
That season, the Risers won 14 straight games before losing to the San Juan Knights. Raymundo, along with Byron Villarias, won the two-ball competition during MPBL All-Star Week.

=== GenSan Warriors ===
In the 2019–20 MPBL season, he scored 22 points and 7 assists to clinch a spot in the playoffs.

=== Nueva Ecija Rice Vanguards ===
In 2022, Raymundo played for Nueva Ecija. He had 5 assists in a win over the Quezon City Capitals.

== Career statistics ==
Legend
GP	Games played	MPG	Minutes per game
FG%	Field-goal percentage	3P%	3-point field-goal percentage	FT%	Free-throw percentage
RPG	Rebounds per game	APG	Assists per game	SPG	Steals per game
BPG	Blocks per game	PPG	Points per game	**Bold**	Career high

=== ABL ===
Year	Team	GP	MPG	FG%	3P%	FT%	RPG	APG	SPG	BPG	PPG
2017–18	Alab	27	13.6	.486	.367	.750	1.9	1.4	.4	.1	4.9
Career		27	13.6	.486	.367	.750	1.9	1.4	.4	.1	4.9

=== PBA ===
==== Season-by-season averages ====
Year	Team	GP	MPG	FG%	3P%	FT%	RPG	APG	SPG	BPG	PPG
2011–12	Talk 'N Text	26	**7.6**	.412	.100	.846	**1.2**	**.9**	.2	.0	1.5
2012–13	Talk 'N Text	**31**	6.1	.294	.227	.500	.6	.5	.1	.0	1.2
2014–15	NLEX	24	**7.6**	**.415**	**.294**	**1.000**	1.0	.8	**.3**	.0	**1.8**
Career		81	7.0	.365	.224	.783	.9	.7	.2	.0	1.5
