= Reginald Johnson =

Reginald Johnson may refer to:

- Reginald Davis Johnson (1882-1952), American architect based in Pasadena, California
- Reggie Johnson (basketball, born 1957)
- Reggie Johnson (basketball, born 1989)
