= Mikh McKinney =

Filipino-American basketball player (born 1992)

No. 22 – Dorados de Chihuahua
- Position: Point guard
- League: LNBP

Personal information
- Born: January 26, 1992 (age 34) San Francisco, California, U.S.
- Listed height: 6 ft 1 in (1.85 m)
- Listed weight: 165 lb (75 kg)

Career information
- High school: Washington (Fremont, California)
- College: Ohlone College (2011–2012); Sacramento State (2012–2015)
- NBA draft: 2015: undrafted
- Playing career: 2015–present

Career history
- 2015–2016: Antwerp Giants
- 2016–2017: Delaware 87ers
- 2017–2020: Chong Son Kung Fu / Macau Black Bears
- 2021: Halcones de Xalapa
- 2021: Edmonton Stingers
- 2022: Zamalek
- 2023: Dorados de Chihuahua
- 2024–2026: Astros de Jalisco
- 2026–present: Dorados de Chihuahua

Career highlights
- ABL ASEAN Heritage Import MVP (2018); AP honorable mention All-American (2015); Big Sky Player of the Year (2015); 2× First-team All-Big Sky (2014, 2015)

Mikhael Alexander Mercado McKinney (born January 26, 1992) is a Filipino-American professional basketball player for the Dorados de Chihuahua of the Liga Nacional de Baloncesto Profesional (LNBP). He played college basketball for Sacramento State and was the first player in the school's Division I history to be named conference player of the year and an honorable mention All-American.

== College career ==
McKinney, a point guard from Fremont, California, started his college career for Ohlone College of the NJCAA. After a season there, he transferred to Sacramento State. McKinney was a two-time unanimous first-team All-Big Sky Conference pick and, in his senior season, was named the Big Sky Player of the Year. For the season, he averaged 19.2 points, 4.9 assists, 2.8 rebounds and 2.4 steals per game.

== Professional career ==
After going undrafted in the 2015 NBA draft, McKinney signed a two-year contract with Port of Antwerp Giants of the Belgian League on July 27, 2015. In 46 games, he averaged 7.8 points, 1.6 rebounds, 2.2 assists and 0.8 steals in 19.7 minutes.

On October 30, 2016, McKinney was drafted in the second round by the Northern Arizona Suns during the 2016 NBA Development League Draft, but was waived by the Suns on November 11. On December 1, he was acquired by the Delaware 87ers.

In 2017, McKinney signed with Chong son Kung Fu of the ASEAN Basketball League as a heritage import player. He led the team to a regular-season title, which qualified the team to the Semi-Finals in the 2018 ABL playoffs, but fell short to the Mono Vampire in a 0–2 sweep.

In 2018, McKinney signed with Macau Black Bears of the ASEAN Basketball League as an import player. They finished 6th in the regular season, with McKinney winning Player of the week in week 3. He led the team to the 2019 ABL playoffs, eventually falling short to the Singapore Slingers 1–2 in the Quarterfinals.

In September 2019, McKinney re-signed with Macau Black Bears of the ASEAN Basketball League as an import player. He led the team to a 7–7 record in the regular season, ranking 6th in the league until the COVID-19 pandemic broke out that cut short the 2019–20 ABL season

On September 23, 2021, Mikhael signed with Halcones de Xalapa of the Liga Nacional de Baloncesto Profesional. In 12 games with Halcones UV Xalapa in Mexico's LNBP, McKinney averaged 15.8 points, 3.6 rebounds, 4.9 assists, and 1.1 steals per game on .489 and .452 shooting from two-point and three-point range, respectively ... On Sept. 25, 2021, McKinney scored a season-high and team-best 28 points, adding two rebounds and eight assists in a 90–87 loss against Lenadores. (Statistics are as of Nov. 26, 2021.)

In December, 2021, Mikhael signed with Edmonton Stingers of the CEBL during its off-season to play in the window 1 of the BCLA. He appeared in 2 games, averaging 16.5 Pts, 4 Rebs, 4 Asts.

In February, 2022, he signed with Zamalek ahead of its games in the 2022 FIBA Intercontinental Cup. On February 12, McKinney made his debut when he scored 15 points in the semifinal of the 2022 FIBA Intercontinental Cup against Burgos. Mikhael re-joined Zamalek to play in the Basketball Africa League for the 2022 BAL season, where he averaged 14 points per game and helped Zamalek finish third.

== Personal life ==
McKinney's father, Phrank, formerly played in the Philippine Basketball League (PBL).
