= Justin Brownlee =

American-Filipino basketball player (born 1988)

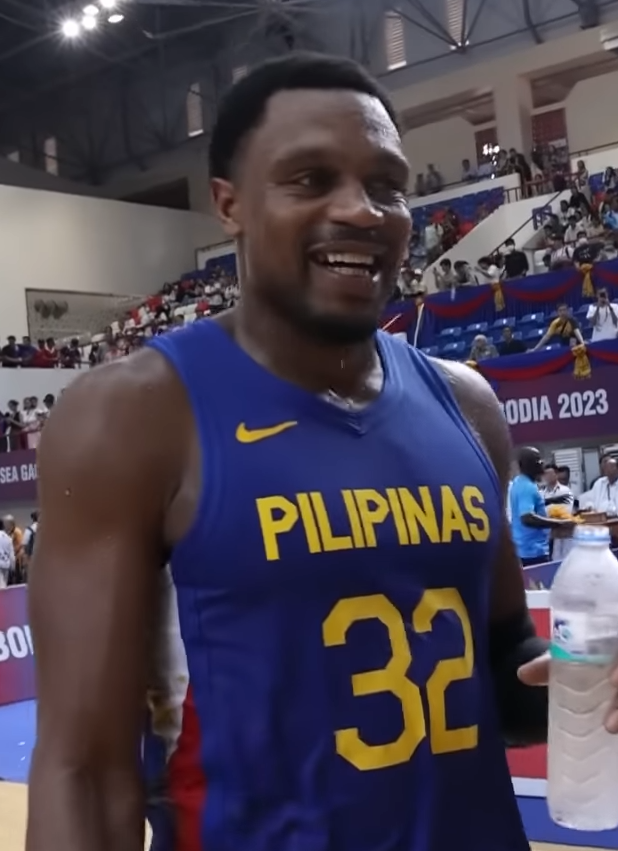
- Brownlee in 2023

No. 32 – Barangay Ginebra San Miguel
- Position: Small forward / power forward
- League: PBA

Personal information
- Born: April 23, 1988 (age 38) Tifton, Georgia, U.S.
- Listed height: 6 ft 7 in (2.01 m)
- Listed weight: 220 lb (100 kg)

Career information
- High school: Choctawhatchee (Fort Walton Beach, Florida)
- College: CC of San Francisco (2006–2007); Chipola College (2008–2009); St. John's (2009–2011)
- NBA draft: 2011: undrafted
- Playing career: 2011–present

Career history
- 2011: Toros de Nuevo Laredo
- 2011–2012: Maine Red Claws
- 2013–2014: Erie Bayhawks
- 2014–2015: Basket Brescia Leonessa
- 2015–2016: Élan Chalon
- 2016–2017: Barangay Ginebra San Miguel
- 2018: San Miguel Alab Pilipinas
- 2018: Barangay Ginebra San Miguel
- 2019: Al Riyadi
- 2019–2020: Barangay Ginebra San Miguel
- 2020–2021: Al Sharjah
- 2021–2023: Barangay Ginebra San Miguel
- 2024: Pelita Jaya
- 2024–2025: Barangay Ginebra San Miguel
- 2025–2026: Meralco Bolts
- 2026–present: Barangay Ginebra San Miguel

Career highlights
- 7× PBA champion (2016 Governors', 2017 Governors', 2018 Commissioner's, 2019 Governors', 2021 Governors', 2022–23 Commissioner's , 2026 Commissioner's); 4× PBA Best Import of the Conference (2018 Commissioner's, 2021 Governors', 2022–23 Commissioner's, 2026 Commissioner's); Italian LNP All-Star (2015); ABL champion (2018); Lebanese League champion (2019); Lebanese Cup winner (2019); All-Lebanese League Third Team (2019); UAE National Basketball League champion (2020); IBL champion (2024)
- Stats at Basketball Reference
Medals
Men's basketball
Representing Philippines
Asian Games
Gold medal – first place	2022 Hangzhou	Team
SEA Games
Gold medal – first place	2023 Phnom Penh	Team

Justin Donta Brownlee (born April 23, 1988) is an American and Filipino professional basketball player for the Barangay Ginebra San Miguel of the Philippine Basketball Association (PBA). He played college basketball for the St. John's Red Storm.

After going undrafted in the 2011 NBA draft, Brownlee played in the NBA Development League for the Maine Red Claws and Erie BayHawks. In 2016, he began his first of six stints at Barangay Ginebra San Miguel of the PBA.

During his tenure with Ginebra, Brownlee established himself as one of the most accomplished imports in PBA history, winning seven championships: four PBA Governors' Cup titles and three PBA Commissioner's Cup titles—the most by any import in league history. He also earned four PBA Best Import of the Conference awards, comprising three in the PBA Commissioner's Cup and one in the PBA Governors' Cup, the second-highest total among PBA imports.

Brownlee likewise enjoyed success outside the Philippines. He helped San Miguel Alab Pilipinas capture the 2017-18 ASEAN Basketball League championship. He later won the 2019 Lebanese Basketball League championship and Lebanese Cup with Al Riyadi Club Beirut, the 2020 UAE National Basketball League championship with Sharjah, and the 2024 Indonesian Basketball League (IBL) championship with Pelita Jaya. Brownlee has also played professionally in Mexico, Italy, and France.

In January 2023, Brownlee became a naturalized Filipino citizen, making him eligible to represent the Philippines in international competitions. He made his debut for the Philippines national basketball team the following month and went on to help win gold medals at both the 2022 Asian Games and the 2023 Southeast Asian Games.

== College career ==
Brownlee played college basketball at St. John's University from 2009 to 2011. In the 2011 Big East Tournament, Brownlee was involved in a controversial situation at the end of the quarterfinal between St. John's and Rutgers: With Rutgers trailing 63–65 in the final seconds, Rutgers inbounded the ball past the half-court line, where Brownlee intercepted the pass, before dribbling past midcourt and stepping out of bounds while travelling with 1.7 seconds remaining, then threw the ball high in the air in celebration. This should have allowed Rutgers an opportunity to inbound from half-court with a chance to tie or win the game, or possibly even free-throws for a technical foul; instead, the game clock continued to run and expired, the game ended without any of the possible violations being assessed.

== Professional career ==
=== Maine Red Claws ===
After Brownlee went undrafted in the 2011 NBA draft, he began his professional basketball career with Maine Red Claws team of the NBA Development League.

=== New York Knicks ===
In the summer of 2012, Brownlee joined the New York Knicks for the 2012 NBA Summer League. He trained for the team during the 2013 Training Camp; but also played in the 2013 NBA Summer League. On September 30, 2013, he was signed a contract to the team prior to the start of the 2013–14 season, but was waived on October 2, 2013, becoming a free agent two days later on October 4, 2013.

=== Erie Bayhawks ===
On November 1, 2013, he was allocated by the Knicks to the Erie Bayhawks team of the NBA Development League, Brownlee averaged 13.85 points, 5.7 rebounds, 2.3 assists, 0.5 blocks and 1.4 steals throughout the regular season. Brownlee also received an NBA D-League Showcase Honorable Mention Team award on January 10, 2014. He was deactivated in the roster for 2 games on February 19, 2014, during their match against the Texas Legends but was activated again during their match against the Fort Wayne Mad Ants on February 28, 2014.

=== Barangay Ginebra San Miguel (2016–2017) ===
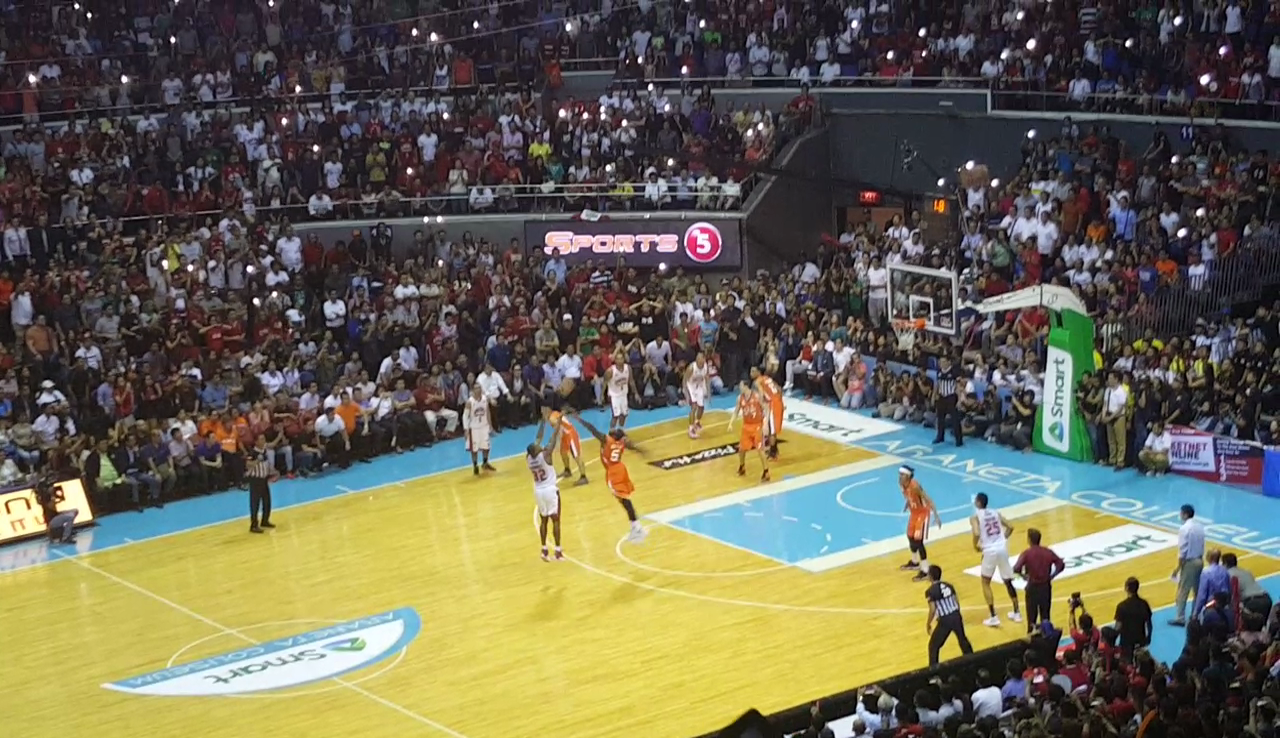
Justin Brownlee attempting the game winning three point shot in Game 6 of the 2016 PBA Governors' Cup Finals.

In his first game with Barangay Ginebra, Brownlee recorded a double-double of 31 points and 13 rebounds but in a losing effort to the Alaska Aces. Brownlee helped Barangay Ginebra win the PBA Governors' Cup both in 2016, where he made the title clinching three-pointer at the buzzer in Game 6 of the finals, and in 2017 in 7 games.

=== San Miguel Alab Pilipinas ===
Brownlee returned to the Philippines for the third time, this time playing for ASEAN Basketball League side San Miguel Alab Pilipinas, where he, along with Renaldo Balkman, would replace Reggie Okosa and Ivan Johnson as the team's imports. With the help of Brownlee and Balkman, the Philippine squad was hailed as the 2017–18 ABL season champion by beating Mono Vampire Basketball Club of Thailand in 3 out 5 games in the championship series.

=== Barangay Ginebra San Miguel (2018) ===
After playing in the ASEAN Basketball League, Brownlee returned with Barangay Ginebra who were down 1–3 in the 2018 Commissioner's Cup. Brownlee helped Barangay Ginebra to secure the fifth seed for the upcoming playoffs. During the 2018 Commissioner Cup's playoffs, Brownlee averaged 27.4 points per game, 12 rebounds per game, 6.6 assists per game and 2.2 blocks per game to lead Ginebra to a 3–1 record in the playoffs to enter the 2018 Commissioner's Cup finals.

In Game 1 of the finals against the San Miguel Beermen, Brownlee led the Barangay Ginebra to a 1–0 series lead with 42 points, 7 rebounds, 9 assists and 2 blocks. He eventually won his first Best Import award and helped the team capture the Commissioner's Cup title winning the series, 4–2.

=== Mighty Sports-Philippines ===
Brownlee was tapped to help lead the Mighty Sports-Philippines basketball team in the 30th Dubai International Basketball Tournament this February 1–9, 2019. He played alongside fellow imports, former NBA player Lamar Odom and Chinese Basketball Association veteran Randolph Morris to reinforce the team.

=== Al Riyadi ===
Before returning to Barangay Ginebra for the 2019 Commissioner's Cup, Brownlee signed with Al Riyadi of the Lebanese Basketball League. He joined the team mid-season.

=== Barangay Ginebra San Miguel (2019–2020) ===
Barangay Ginebra tapped Brownlee again for the 2019 Commissioner's Cup. He debut for the Barangay Ginebra against the Blackwater Elite on May 24, 2019. He scored a game-high 44 points to go along with 10 rebounds and 7 assists but his team was defeated by Blackwater in OT. The next game, Brownlee recorded 27 points, 12 rebounds, 8 assists and 4 blocks in a 110–95 victory over the Meralco Bolts. It was Barangay Ginebra's first win of the conference. On June 16, Brownlee scored a season-high 39 points to go along with 15 rebounds and 5 assists in a 110–107 win over San Miguel. On July 7, in a game against the Magnolia Hotshots Pambansang Manok, Brownlee scored a professional career-high 49 points as he led the Barangay Ginebra in a win over Magnolia. He also recorded 20 rebounds and 7 assists in the game. In the last game of the elimination round, Justin Brownlee broke again his career-high with 50 points in a 127–123 overtime win over the Columbian Dyip.

During the playoffs, Brownlee led Barangay Ginebra towards a series sweep against Magnolia after averaging 25 points per game and 12.5 rebounds per game while shooting 52.5 percent from the field in the series. In the semifinals round, Brownlee and the Barangay Ginebra were up against the top-seeded TNT KaTropa led by former NBA player Terrence Jones. They lose the series against TNT.

However, in the 2019 Governors' Cup, he led his team to another championship by beating Meralco in the finals in 5 games.

=== Al Sharjah ===
Brownlee suited up for Al Sharjah of the UAE National Basketball League.

=== Barangay Ginebra San Miguel (2021–2023) ===
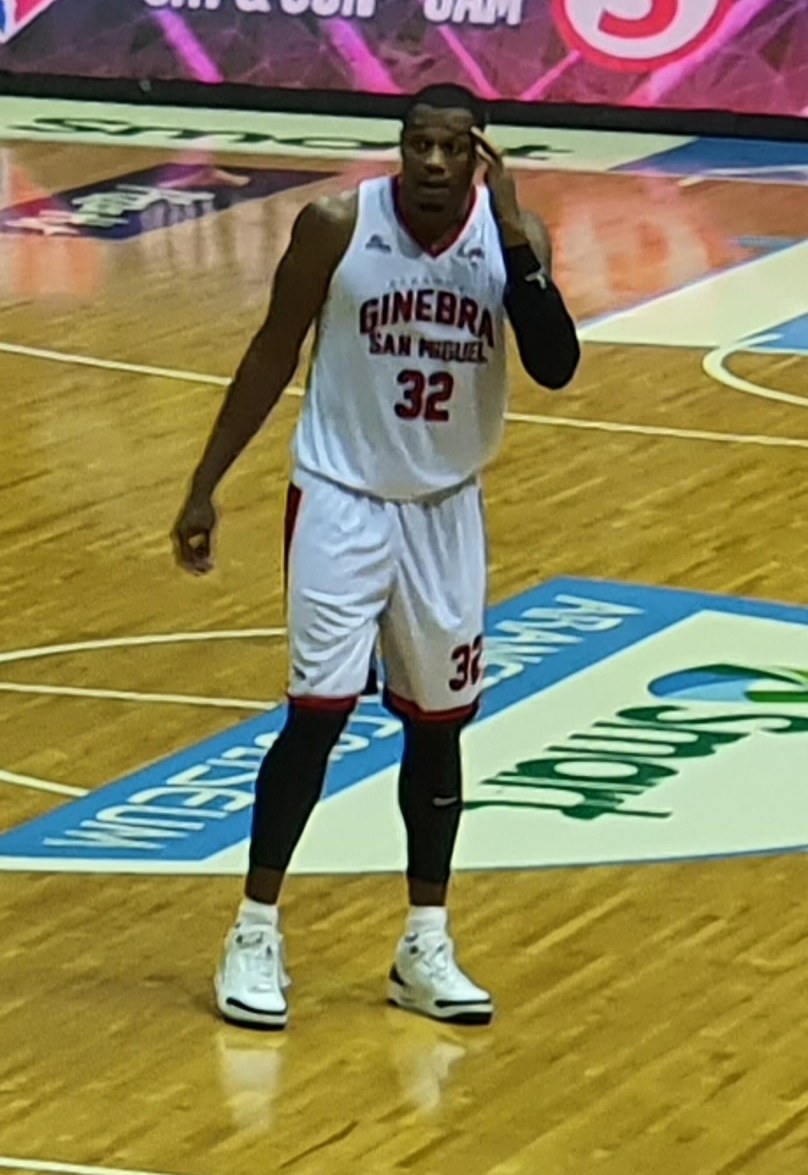
Brownlee with the Barangay Ginebra San Miguel in 2021

Brownlee suited up for Barangay Ginebra for the 2021 Governors' Cup. He recorded 38 points and 12 rebounds to extend the first-round series against TNT. Also, his 38 points elevated him to seventh place in the PBA All-time import scoring list, passing former import Larry McNeill. He led his team to their eighth semifinals appearance in eight tries and later to fifth finals appearance with him on the roster. On April 13, 2022, he won his second Best Import Award and became the tenth import to win such award multiple times. On April 17, 2022, Brownlee became the first import to register 400 three pointers in PBA's history. On April 22, 2022, he surpassed Billy Ray Bates in the scoring list for imports and at that time, in fifth place with 4,539 points. As of April 2022, he is behind Norman Black with 11,329, Bobby Parks Sr. with 8,955, Sean Chambers with 8,225, and Lew Massey with 5,386. He is ahead of Bates with 4,523, Francois Wise with 4,332, McNeill with 4,169, Donnie Koonce with 4,103 and Billy Robinson with 4,024 points.

Brownlee returned for the 2022–23 Commissioner's Cup. On November 18, 2022, in a win against Blackwater, he recorded his 300th steal, the first PBA import to reach that milestone.

On December 18, 2022, win against Magnolia, he was the fifth import to reach 5,000 career points. On December 21, 2022, he led his team to a win against Magnolia. That win leads him to his sixth finals appearance. On January 6, 2023, he won his third Best Import Award. On January 15, 2023, he captured his sixth PBA championship after leading Barangay Ginebra San Miguel to a Game 7 victory against Bay Area Dragons in the finals. The title tied him with Sean Chambers for the most titles won by a PBA import, with six, while extending his unbeaten record in PBA Finals series at that time. Following the championship-clinching game, he also reached career totals of 5,268 points, 331 steals, and 476 3-point field goals made.

On his first game on February 5, 2023, for the 2023 Governors' Cup, he recorded a triple-double of 29 points, 11 rebounds and 10 assists in a win against Rain or Shine Elasto Painters. On February 17, 2023, he surpassed Massey in the import scoring list for fourth all-time with 5,388 points.

On March 19, 2023, he recorded a career 502 three-point field goals made and led his team to tenth semi-finals appearance with him on the roster after a win against NLEX Road Warriors. On March 29, 2023, he helped his team to advance to seventh finals appearance with him on the roster after a three-game series sweep of San Miguel. In the finals, Barangay Ginebra lost to TNT in six games, despite Brownlee's 29-point outing in Game 6.

After Brownlee failed a doping test at the 2022 Asian Games, he opted not to play at the 2023–24 Commissioner's Cup pending the extent of the sanction to be imposed on him by FIBA. Tony Bishop was brought in to play in lieu of Brownlee.

=== Pelita Jaya (2024) ===
Pelita Jaya of the Indonesian Basketball League announced on March 20, 2024, that they have signed in Brownlee. He helped his team win the 2024 IBL season.

=== Barangay Ginebra San Miguel (2024–2025) ===
Brownlee returned with the Barangay Ginebra in time for the 2024 Governors' Cup. On August 27, 2024, he scored his new career high of 51 points in a 108–102 victory against San Miguel.

=== Meralco Bolts (2025–2026) ===
On September 11, 2025, Brownlee joined the Meralco Bolts in the East Asia Super League. He was designated as a naturalized player.

=== Barangay Ginebra San Miguel (2026–present) ===
Brownlee returned with the Barangay Ginebra for his eighth season with the franchise and in the PBA.

On June 10, 2026, Brownlee captured his fourth Best Import award during the 2026 Commissioner's Cup. Two days later, on June 12, he recorded a career-high 54 points, leading Barangay Ginebra to a victory over TNT in Game 5 of the finals and giving his team a 3–2 lead in the series. On June 17, 2026, Brownlee secured his seventh championship in his tenth Finals appearance after Barangay Ginebra defeated TNT in Game 7 of the championship series. He has not appeared in a game ever since due to an apparent hamstring injury.

In September 2026, Barangay Ginebra has brought in Jordan Murphy ahead of the 2026 Governors' Cup as Brownlee remains unavailable.

== National team career ==
In August 2018, Brownlee expressed his desire to stay in the Philippines and be a naturalized citizen. On August 15, 2018, a bill has been filed at the House of Representatives during the 18th Congress to grant Filipino citizenship to Brownlee. The bill did not become law, and was refiled in the 19th Congress. The proposed measure, House Bill 6224 was approved by the House of Representatives in November 2022. A counterpart bill in the Senate was likely passed the following month. President Bongbong Marcos signed the measure into law on January 12, 2023, making Brownlee eligible to play for the Philippine national basketball team as a naturalized player under FIBA eligibility rules. He made his debut for the team in the 2023 FIBA Basketball World Cup Asian qualifier game against Lebanon on February 24, 2023.

In May 2023, Brownlee played for the Philippines in the 2023 Southeast Asian Games. He led the team in points, rebounds, and assists in the semi-final against Indonesia and the gold medal win over hosts Cambodia.

He was included in the 21-man pool for the 2023 FIBA Basketball World Cup. However, he was not selected as the Philippines chose Jordan Clarkson as its lone naturalized player. Instead, Brownlee played for the team in the subsequent 2022 Asian Games, where the team won the gold medal over Jordan, led by Rondae Hollis-Jefferson. However, on October 12, 2023, the International Testing Agency announced that Brownlee tested positive for 11-Nor-9-carboxy-THC, a substance linked to cannabis use and is prohibited by the World Anti-Doping Agency. The test was conducted on October 7, a day after the Asian Games final where the Philippines beat Jordan. His substance intake was due to prescription drugs as part of his recovery from a surgery prior to the games. Brownlee eventually sat out the 2023–24 PBA Commissioner's Cup with his team Ginebra in a bid to minimize the impact of his sanction.

On February 3, 2024, the Samahang Basketbol ng Pilipinas (SBP) announced that Brownlee is cleared to play for the national team in the February 2024 window of the 2025 FIBA Asia Cup qualification. The SBP revealed that FIBA gave Brownlee a three-month period of ineligibility. Since Brownlee did not play in any competitive game since the Asian Games, his sanction was retroactively applied on November 9, 2023, which meant that Brownlee is eligible to play for the national team during the aforementioned qualifying window.

Brownlee could be barred from playing from the 2025 FIBA Asia Cup, after he received an "adverse analytical finding" or a positive test for banned substance from FIBA in early 2025. It is reportedly due to a recreational drug use specifically marijuana.

Brownlee was unavailable for the national team since the July 2026 window of the 2027 FIBA World Cup qualifiers. The SBP announced at the time that he was recovering from an injury.

Despite the injury, Brownlee was included in the 12-man roster for the 2026 Asian Games in Aichi and Nagoya, Japan just in case he received medical clearance. He however was replaced by Calvin Oftana In a Senate inquiry triggered by the national team's early group stage, head coach Tim Cone clarified that Brownlee was unavailable due to blood pressure and heart issues and not due to injury concerns.

== Personal life ==
Justin Brownlee has a twin sister, two other sisters, and a brother. Brownlee himself has four children, including Justin Brownlee Jr. who is now a basketball player as well. Unlike the father, the younger Brownlee has no Philippine citizenship.

== Career statistics ==
Legend
GP	Games played	MPG	Minutes per game	FG%	Field-goal percentage
3FG%	3-point field-goal percentage	4P%	4-point field-goal percentage	FT%	Free-throw percentage
RPG	Rebounds per game	APG	Assists per game	SPG	Steals per game
BPG	Blocks per game	PPG	Points per game	**127**	Career high

Year	Team	League	GP	MPG	FG%	3P%	FT%	RPG	APG	SPG	BPG	PPG
2011	Toros de Nuevo Laredo	LNBP	10	26.9	.500	.300	.739	6.0	1.8	1.2	.5	13.6
2011–12	Maine Red Claws	NBA D-League	**50**	23.5	.447	.296	.796	4.9	1.4	.8	.5	8.0
2013–14	Erie Bayhawks	NBA D-League	46	26.8	.508	.375	.718	5.7	2.4	1.4	.5	13.9
2014–15	Germani Basket Brescia	Serie A2	35	31.1	.498	.394	.674	7.9	1.9	.9	.7	16.3
2015–16	Élan Chalon	LNB Pro A	36	21.2	.476	.272	.817	5.5	1.4	.7	.4	9.3
2015–16	Élan Chalon	Leaders Cup	3	14.7	**.538**	.333	**1.000**	1.0	.0	.0	.0	6.0
2015–16	Élan Chalon	EuroCup	19	20.7	.522	**.442**	.838	4.0	1.8	.4	.1	8.8
2018	San Miguel Alab Pilipinas	ABL	25	35.4	.460	.356	.750	**10.3**	**6.3**	**1.6**	**1.6**	**21.8**
2019	Al Riyadi Beirut Club	FBL League	15	27.9	.533	.370	.844	4.8	2.0	.9	.7	16.1
2024	Pelita Jaya	IBL	17	29.5	.518	.397	.744	7.5	4.4	1.4	.3	13.3
2025–26	Meralco Bolts	EASL	2	**35.5**	.276	.267	**1.000**	7.0	6.0	1.0	1.0	12.0

=== PBA season-by-season averages ===
As of the end of 2024–25 season

Year	Team	GP	MPG	FG%	3P%	4P%	FT%	RPG	APG	SPG	BPG	PPG
2015–16	Barangay Ginebra	22	40.5	.504	.360	—	.663	11.3	3.8	1.7	.9	28.6
2016–17	Barangay Ginebra	39	40.6	.493	.365	—	.707	11.5	4.8	1.7	**2.1**	25.9
2017–18	Barangay Ginebra	35	41.8	.516	.358	—	.819	12.3	**6.7**	1.9	1.7	**30.4**
2019	Barangay Ginebra	38	**44.3**	.506	.348	—	.771	**12.9**	6.3	**2.3**	1.5	30.2
2021	Barangay Ginebra	23	44.1	**.538**	**.387**	—	.812	11.7	5.7	1.7	2.0	29.9
2022–23	Barangay Ginebra	46	42.2	.507	.364	—	**.832**	10.3	6.5	1.3	1.6	27.8
2024–25	Barangay Ginebra	**52**	40.7	.472	.374	.225	.789	9.2	5.0	1.1	1.2	24.9
Career		255	41.9	.502	.364	.225	.782	11.1	5.6	1.6	1.5	27.9

=== National team ===
Legend
GP	Games played	MPG	Minutes per game
FG%	Field-goal percentage	3P%	3-point field-goal percentage	FT%	Free-throw percentage
RPG	Rebounds per game	APG	Assists per game	SPG	Steals per game
BPG	Blocks per game	PPG	Points per game	**Bold**	Career high

==== FIBA ====
Year	Team	GP	MPG	FG%	3P%	FT%	RPG	APG	SPG	BPG	PPG
2023 FIBA Basketball World Cup qualification	Philippines	2	32.3	**.575**	**.700**	.714	8.0	4.0	1.0	.5	**29.0**
2024 FIBA Men's Olympic Qualifying Tournaments	Philippines	3	**38.3**	.462	.435	**1.000**	**8.3**	**6.3**	1.0	**.7**	23.0
2025 FIBA Asia Cup qualification	Philippines	**6**	31.8	**.575**	.520	.862	7.3	5.0	**1.7**	**.7**	21.7
2025 FIBA Asia Cup	Philippines	5	33.8	.536	.483	.714	5.2	3.6	1.0	.4	20.6
Career		16	33.7	.539	.506	.824	6.9	4.7	1.3	.6	22.5

==== Asian Games ====
Year	Team	GP	MPG	FG%	3P%	FT%	RPG	APG	SPG	BPG	PPG
2022	Philippines	7	30.1	.447	.404	.811	7.9	3.6	1.9	.4	22.6
Career		7	30.1	.447	.404	.811	7.9	3.6	1.9	.4	22.6

==== Southeast Asian Games ====
Year	Team	GP	MPG	FG%	3P%	FT%	RPG	APG	SPG	BPG	PPG
2023	Philippines	5	25.7	.410	.345	.842	6.2	3.4	1.6	1.2	18.0
Career		5	25.7	.410	.345	.842	6.2	3.4	1.6	1.2	18.0
