= 2018 ABL finals =

Championship series of the ASEAN Basketball League 2017–18 season

Team	Coach	Wins
(Philippines) San Miguel Alab Pilipinas	Jimmy Alapag	3
(Thailand) Mono Vampire	Douglas Marty	2
- Dates: 22 April – 2 May 2018
- MVP: Bobby Ray Parks Jr.

The 2018 ASEAN Basketball League (ABL) finals was the best-of-5 championship series of the 2017–18 ABL season and the conclusion of the season's playoffs. Mono Vampire and San Miguel Alab Pilipinas competed for the 8th championship contested by the league.

After a decider game 5, San Miguel Alab Pilipinas eventually clinched the club's first franchise championship in its history, and the third ABL Championship that came from the Philippines. Bobby Ray Parks Jr. was named as the Finals MVP after averaging 23 points per game in the finals series.

== Background ==
Mono Vampire		San Miguel Alab Pilipinas
Finished 14–6 (.700) tied for 2nd place with Hong Kong Eastern and San Miguel Alab Pilipinas	Regular season	Finished 14–6 (.700) tied for 2nd place with Hong Kong Eastern and Mono Vampire
1–3 win–loss record among tied teams (4th place)	Tiebreaker*	2–2 win–loss record among tied teams (3rd place)
Def. 5th-seeded Singapore Slingers, 2–0	Quarterfinals	Def. 6th-seeded Saigon Heat, 2–0
Def. top-seeded Chong Son Kung Fu, 2–0	Semifinals	Def. 2nd-seeded Hong Kong Eastern, 2–0

=== Head-to-head matchups ===
Regular-season series
San Miguel Alab Pilipinas won 2–0 in regular season series

14 January 2018
7:00 p.m.

Box score

(Thailand) Mono Vampire	87–114	(Philippines) Tanduay Alab Pilipinas
Scoring by quarter: 22–32, 15–22, 25–34, 25–26
Pts: Singletary 24; Rebs: Deguara 12; Asts: Brickman, Kruatiwa 3		Pts: Brownlee 29; Rebs: Maierhofer, Brownlee 8 Asts: Brownlee 9

Stadium 29, Nonthaburi
Referees: Chen Ying-cheng (TPE), Chan Ho Ming (HKG), Allan Cheong (SIN)

7 February 2018
8:00 p.m.

Box score

(Philippines) San Miguel Alab Pilipinas	86–84	(Thailand) Mono Vampire
Scoring by quarter: 22–18, 16–22, 30–20, 18–24
Pts: Balkman 31; Rebs: Balkman 13; Asts: Brownlee 8		Pts: Deguara 21; Rebs: Deguara 15; Asts: Brickman 11

Baliwag Star Arena, Baliuag, Bulacan
Referees: Chu Wei Chuen (MAS), Ho Chang-jen (TPE), Chang Lu-yueh (TPE)

This is the first playoff and finals meeting between Alab Pilipinas and Mono Vampire.

== Series summary ==
Game	Date	Venue	Winner	Result
Game 1	22 April	City of Santa Rosa Multi-Purpose Complex	Alab	143–130 (OT)
Game 2	25 April	City of Santa Rosa Multi-Purpose Complex	Mono	103–100
Game 3	28 April	Stadium 29	Alab	99–93
Game 4	30 April	Stadium 29	Mono	88–83
Game 5	2 May	City of Santa Rosa Multi-Purpose Complex	Alab	102–92

== Game summaries ==
- All times local; UTC+8 for the Philippines, and UTC+7 for Thailand

=== Game 1 ===
22 April
8:00 p.m.

Box score

San Miguel Alab Pilipinas (Philippines)	143–130 (OT)	(Thailand) Mono Vampire
Scoring by quarter: 26–32, 33–26, 28–29, 34–34, Overtime: 22–9
Pts: Brownlee 46; Rebs: Balkman 15; Asts: Brownlee 9		Pts: Singletary 42; Rebs: Deguara 11; Asts: Brickman 14
Alab leads series, 1–0

City of Santa Rosa Multi-Purpose Complex, Santa Rosa
Referees: Yuen Chun Yip (HKG), Leong Chuen Wing (SIN), Chu Wei Chuen (MAS)

=== Game 2 ===
25 April
8:00 p.m.

Box score

San Miguel Alab Pilipinas (Philippines)	100–103	(Thailand) Mono Vampire
Scoring by quarter: 20–24, 25–28, 28–26, 27–25
Pts: Balkman 37; Rebs: Balkman 12; Asts: Balkman, Brownlee 6		Pts: Deguara 30; Rebs: Deguara 20; Asts: Brickman 11
Series tied, 1–1

City of Santa Rosa Multi-Purpose Complex, Santa Rosa
Referees: Harja Jaladri (INA), Chan Owe Shiong (MAS), Leong Chuen Wing (SIN)

=== Game 3 ===
28 April
3:30 p.m.

Box score

Mono Vampire (Thailand)	93–99	(Philippines) San Miguel Alab Pilipinas
Scoring by quarter: 20–22, 30–26, 17–27, 26–24
Pts: Singletary 29; Rebs: Deguara 14; Asts: Brickman 12		Pts: Parks 30; Rebs: Balkman 16; Asts: Balkman, Brownlee 7
Alab leads series, 2–1

Stadium 29, Nonthaburi

=== Game 4 ===
30 April
3:30 p.m.

Box score

Mono Vampire (Thailand)	88–83	(Philippines) San Miguel Alab Pilipinas
Scoring by quarter: 23–18, 22–24, 24–27, 19–14
Pts: Deguara, Singletary 20; Rebs: Deguara 13; Asts: Brickman 10		Pts: Parks 21; Rebs: Balkman, Brownlee 13; Asts: Brownlee 6
Series tied, 2–2

Stadium 29, Nonthaburi
Referees: Andy Cheung (HKG), Johan Christiana (INA), Tee Yong Sern (MAS)

=== Game 5 ===
2 May
8:00 p.m.

Box score

San Miguel Alab Pilipinas (Philippines)	102–92	(Thailand) Mono Vampire
Scoring by quarter: 27–14, 27–31, 28–16, 20–31
Pts: Balkman 32; Rebs: Brownlee 12; Asts: Brownlee 9		Pts: Singletary 32; Rebs: Deguara 18; Asts: Brickman 6
Alab wins series, 3–2

City of Santa Rosa Multi-Purpose Complex, Santa Rosa
Attendance: 5,898
Referees: Yuen Chun Yip (HKG), Harja Jaladri (INA), Haryanto Sutaryo (INA)
