= 2017–18 ABL season =

- League: ASEAN Basketball League
- Sport: Basketball
- Duration: Regular season: 17 November 2017 – 28 March 2018; Playoffs: 1 April – 2 May 2018
- Games: 103 (90 regular season, 13 playoffs)
- Teams: 9
- TV partner(s): (Hong Kong) Cable TV (Indonesia) MNC Sports & Vidio (Philippines) ABS-CBN Sports and Action (Singapore) StarHub (Thailand) MONO29 (Taiwan) Eleven Sports Network (Vietnam) HTV

Regular season
- Top seed: Chong Son Kung Fu
- Season MVP: Local: Bobby Ray Parks Jr. (Alab); Heritage import: Mikh McKinney (Chong Son); World import: Anthony Tucker (Chong Son)

ABL finals
- Champions: (Philippines) San Miguel Alab Pilipinas
- Runners-up: (Thailand) Mono Vampire
- Finals MVP: Bobby Ray Parks Jr.

ABL seasons
- ← 2016–17 2018–19 →

The 2017–18 ABL season is the eighth season of competition of the ASEAN Basketball League. The regular season started on 17 November 2017 and ended on 28 March 2018.

== Teams ==
Five teams from the 2016–2017 ABL season returned for this season. One team, the Kaohsiung Truth, disbanded prior to the season. One team, Mono Vampire, returned after skipping last season, having played in the 2015–16 ABL season. The team plans to concurrently play in the ABL and in the Thailand Basketball League for the upcoming season. Three teams were accepted as new members: Nanhai Long-Lions, Formosa Dreamers and CLS Knights Surabaya. The Long-Lions are the developmental team of the Guangzhou Long-Lions, the Dreamers are an expansion team from Taiwan, and the Knights left the Indonesian Basketball League to play in the ABL.

Prior their first game, the Nanhai Long-Lions renamed themselves as the Nanhai Kung Fu. After partnering with Macau's Grupo Desportivo Chong Son they changed their name once again to Chong Son Kung Fu days before the season started.

Alab Pilipinas renamed their team as the Tanduay Alab Pilipinas after securing a sponsorship deal with Asia Brewery, prior the season started.

CLS Knights Surabaya renamed their team as "CLS Knights Indonesia" prior the season started.

Tanduay Alab Pilipinas was renamed as "San Miguel Alab Pilipinas" by 1 February 2018, when the primary sponsor was changed from Tanduay to San Miguel Beer Pale Pilsen.

=== Venues and locations ===
Locations of ABL teams.

Team	City / Region	Arena	Capacity
(China) Chong Son Kung Fu	Nanhai District, Foshan	Nanhai Gymnasium	4,000
CLS Knights Indonesia	Surabaya	GOR Kertajaya Surabaya	3,000
(Chinese Taipei) Formosa Dreamers	Changhua	Changhua Stadium	8,000
Hong Kong Eastern	Wan Chai, Hong Kong	Southorn Stadium	2,000
(Thailand) Mono Vampire	Bangkok Metropolitan Region	Stadium 29, Nonthaburi	5,000
(Vietnam) Saigon Heat	Ho Chi Minh City	Canadian International School Vietnam Arena	2,500
(Philippines) San Miguel Alab Pilipinas*	Metro Manila	Mall of Asia Arena, Pasay	25,000
(Philippines) San Miguel Alab Pilipinas*	Metro Manila	Filoil Flying V Centre, San Juan	5,500
(Philippines) San Miguel Alab Pilipinas*	Metro Manila	Caloocan Sports Complex, Caloocan	3,000
(Philippines) San Miguel Alab Pilipinas*	Baliuag, Bulacan	Baliwag Star Arena	
(Philippines) San Miguel Alab Pilipinas*	Santa Rosa	City of Santa Rosa Multi-Purpose Complex	5,700
(Philippines) San Miguel Alab Pilipinas*	Antipolo	Ynares Center	7,400
(Philippines) San Miguel Alab Pilipinas*	Davao City	University of Southeastern Philippines Gymnasium	7,000
Singapore Slingers	Singapore	OCBC Arena, Kallang	3,000
Westports Malaysia Dragons	Kuala Lumpur	MABA Stadium	2,500

=== Personnel ===
Team	Head coach
Chong Son Kung Fu	(Canada) Charles Dubé-Brais
CLS Knights Indonesia	(Indonesia) Koko Heru Setyo Nugroho
Formosa Dreamers	(Taiwan) Hsu Hao Cheng
Hong Kong Eastern	(Spain) Edu Torres
Mono Vampire	(United States) Douglas Clark Marty
Saigon Heat	(Canada) Kyle Julius
San Miguel Alab Pilipinas	(Philippines) Jimmy Alapag
Singapore Slingers	(Singapore) Neo Beng Siang
Westports Malaysia Dragons	(United States) Chris Thomas

=== Imports ===
The following is the list of imports, which had played for their respective teams at least once. In the left are the World Imports, and in the right are the ASEAN/Heritage Imports. Flags indicate the citizenship/s the player holds.

Each team is allowed to sign two types of imports at most on its roster.

Team	World import(s)	ASEAN/Heritage import(s)	Former import(s)
Chong Son Kung Fu	(United States) Justin Howard (United States) Anthony Tucker	(Philippines) (United States) Mikh McKinney (Philippines) (United States) Caelan Tiongson	(Philippines) (Canada) Jonathan Bermillo
CLS Knights Indonesia	(United States) Shane Edwards (United States) Brian Williams	(Thailand) (Israel) (United States) Freddie Goldstein (Philippines) (United States) Keith Jensen	(United States) Evan Brock (United States) Duke Crews (United States) Decorey Jones (Philippines) Rudy Lingganay
Formosa Dreamers	(El Salvador) Ronnie Aguilar (United States) Cameron Forte	(Taiwan) (United Kingdom) Charles Barratt (United States) (Taiwan) Kenneth Chien	(United States) Jaleel Cousins (Philippines) (Canada) James Forrester (Nigeria) Reggie Okosa (United States) Lenny Daniel (United States) Erron Maxey
Hong Kong Eastern	(United States) Marcus Elliott (The Bahamas) Ryan Moss	(Thailand) (United States) Tyler Lamb (Philippines) (Germany) Christian Standhardinger	
Mono Vampire	(Malta) (Italy) Samuel Deguara (United States) Mike Singletary	(Philippines) (United States) Jason Brickman (Philippines) Paul Zamar	(United States) Reggie Johnson (United States) Patrick Sanders
Saigon Heat	(United States) Maxie Esho (Jamaica) Akeem Scott	(Thailand) (United States) Moses Morgan (Philippines) (United States) Mikey Williams	(United States) Travele Jones
San Miguel Alab Pilipinas	(Puerto Rico) (United States) Renaldo Balkman (United States) Justin Brownlee	(Philippines) (United States) Lawrence Domingo	(United States) Ivan Johnson (Nigeria) Reggie Okosa
Singapore Slingers	(United States) Xavier Alexander (United States) Christien Charles	(Philippines) (Canada) A. J. Mandani	(Canada) Ryan Wright
Westports Malaysia Dragons	(United States) Bryan Davis (United States) Chris Eversley	(Philippines) (United States) Jawhar Purdy (Philippines) (United States) Joshua Munzon	(Philippines) Reil Cervantes (United States) Solomon Jones (United States) Curtis Washington (Philippines) Patrick Cabahug (United States) Marcus Marshall (United States) AJ West

== Regular season ==
Each team will play 20 games throughout the season, 10 at home and 10 away. Each team will play 8 other teams twice, home and away, for a total of 16 games, plus 4 more games against two teams, also home and away, taking the total to 20 games. This is how the teams were grouped on which teams will play each other four times:

- Chong Son, Eastern, Formosa
- CLS, Alab, Singapore
- Malaysia, Mono, Saigon

=== Standings ===
Pos	Team	Pld	W	L	PF	PA	PD	PCT	GB	Qualification
1	(China) Chong Son Kung Fu	20	15	5	1864	1638	+226	.750	—	Semi-finals
2	Hong Kong Eastern	20	14	6	1949	1856	+93	.700 (Note: Head-to-head record: Hong Kong Eastern 3–1; San Miguel Alab Pilipinas 2–2; Mono Vampire 1–3)	1	Semi-finals
3	(Philippines) San Miguel Alab Pilipinas	20	14	6	1844	1681	+163	.700	1	Quarter-finals
4	(Thailand) Mono Vampire	20	14	6	2024	1957	+67	.700	1	Quarter-finals
5	Singapore Slingers	20	12	8	1651	1598	+53	.600	3	Quarter-finals
6	(Vietnam) Saigon Heat	20	10	10	1963	1956	+7	.500	5	Quarter-finals
7	CLS Knights Indonesia	20	5	15	1614	1733	−119	.250 (Note: Head-to-head record: CLS Knights Indonesia 2–0; Westports Malaysia Dragons 0–2)	10	
8	Westports Malaysia Dragons	20	5	15	1802	1974	−172	.250	10	
9	(Chinese Taipei) Formosa Dreamers	20	1	19	1593	1901	−308	.050	14	

Source: ASEANBasketballLeague.com

=== Results ===
==== First and second rounds ====
Home \ Away	ALP	CKF	CLS	FMD	HKE	MNV	SGH	SGS	WMD
San Miguel Alab Pilipinas	—	94–91*	84–67	117–93	89–92	86–84	126–100	83–97	90–79
Chong Son Kung Fu	92–79	—	100–75	86–59	94–85	113–95	94–79	83–59	96–79
CLS Knights Indonesia	87–92	83–86	—	94–73	78–87	80–86	88–93	71–79	87–68
Formosa Dreamers	61–78	77–88	74–105	—	97–120	84–104	85–99	69–87	92–95*
Hong Kong Eastern	99–96	88–76	104–81	99–79	—	111–119	115–121*	82–79	104–92
Mono Vampire	87–114	105–92	98–85	93–85	105–112	—	116–104*	90–78	112–116**
Saigon Heat	87–95	96–93	114–86	75–80	118–115*	110–94	—	77–97	102–88
Singapore Slingers	80–89*	89–86	76–73	72–65	77–81	88–91	94–76	—	90–89**
Westports Malaysia Dragons	90–89	81–96	82–92	84–74	96–110	90–107	91–87	85–94	—

Source: ASEANBasketballLeague.com
Legend: Blue = home team win; Red = away team win.
Matches with lighter background shading were decided after overtime.

==== Third and fourth rounds ====
Home \ Away	ALP	CKF	CLS	FMD	HKE	MNV	SGH	SGS	WMD
San Miguel Alab Pilipinas	—		101–63					80–90	
Chong Son Kung Fu		—		108–79	87–76				
CLS Knights Indonesia	73–80		—					81–92	
Formosa Dreamers		83–105		—	91–93				
Hong Kong Eastern		77–88		99–93	—				
Mono Vampire						—	118–113		115–111
Saigon Heat						83–97	—		115–103
Singapore Slingers	69–82		64–65					—	
Westports Malaysia Dragons						102–108	81–114		—

Source: ASEANBasketballLeague.com
Legend: Blue = home team win; Red = away team win.

== Playoffs ==
Quarterfinals
4 (Thailand) Mono Vampire	2
5 Singapore Slingers	0
3 (Philippines) San Miguel Alab Pilipinas	2
6 (Vietnam) Saigon Heat	0

Semifinals
1 (China) Chong Son Kung Fu	0
4 (Thailand) Mono Vampire	2
2 Hong Kong Eastern	0
3 (Philippines) San Miguel Alab Pilipinas	2

Finals
4 (Thailand) Mono Vampire	2
3 (Philippines) San Miguel Alab Pilipinas	3

=== Quarterfinals ===
The quarterfinals is a best-of-three series, with the higher seeded team hosting game 1, and 3 if necessary.

Team 1	Series	Team 2	Game 1	Game 2	Game 3
San Miguel Alab Pilipinas (Philippines)	2–0	(Vietnam) Saigon Heat	110–100	96–85	—
Mono Vampire (Thailand)	2–0	Singapore Slingers	85–82	85–82	—

=== Semi-finals ===
The semifinals is a best-of-three series, with the higher seeded team hosting game 1, and 3 if necessary.

Team 1	Series	Team 2	Game 1	Game 2	Game 3
Chong Son Kung Fu (China)	0–2	(Thailand) Mono Vampire	94–103	80–83	—
Hong Kong Eastern	0–2	(Philippines) San Miguel Alab Pilipinas	94–98	72–79	—

=== Finals ===
The finals is a best-of-five series, with the higher seeded team hosting Game 1, 2, and 5, if necessary.

Team 1	Series	Team 2	Game 1	Game 2	Game 3	Game 4	Game 5
San Miguel Alab Pilipinas (Philippines)	3–2	(Thailand) Mono Vampire	143–130 (OT)	100–103	99–93	83–88	102–92

== Awards ==
=== Finals awards ===
2017–18 ABL champions
San Miguel Alab Pilipinas
(1st title)

Finals MVP
Bobby Ray Parks Jr.

=== End-of-season awards ===
The winners were announced before game 2 of the 2018 ABL finals at the City of Santa Rosa Multi-Purpose Complex in Santa Rosa, Laguna, Philippines.

- Most Valuable Players:
  - Local: Bobby Ray Parks Jr. (San Miguel Alab Pilipinas)
  - Heritage Import: Mikh McKinney (Chong Son Kung Fu)
  - World Import: Anthony Tucker (Chong Son Kung Fu)
- Defensive Player of the Year: Renaldo Balkman (San Miguel Alab Pilipinas) and Chris Charles (Singapore Slingers)
- Coach of the Year: Charles Dube-Brais (Chong Son Kung Fu)

=== Players of the Week ===
==== Local players ====
Week	Player	Club
17–19 November	(Indonesia) Kaleb Ramot Gemilang	CLS Knights Indonesia
20–26 November	(Malaysia) Ivan Yeo	Westports Malaysia Dragons
27 November–3 December	(Hong Kong) Lee Ki	Hong Kong Eastern
4–10 December	(Taiwan) Yang Tian You	(Taiwan) Formosa Dreamers
11–17 December	(Hong Kong) Lee Ki	Hong Kong Eastern
18–24 December	(Thailand) Teerawat Chantachon	(Thailand) Mono Vampire
2–8 January	(Thailand) Chitchai Ananti	(Thailand) Mono Vampire
9–15 January	(Singapore) Ng Han Bin	Singapore Slingers
16–22 January	(Singapore) Delvin Goh	Singapore Slingers
23–29 January	(Indonesia) Ebrahim Enguio	CLS Knights Indonesia
30 January–5 February	(Philippines) (United States) Bobby Ray Parks Jr.	(Philippines) San Miguel Alab Pilipinas
6–12 February	(China) Luo Yongxuan	(China) Chong Son Kung Fu
13–19 February	(Philippines) (United States) Bobby Ray Parks Jr.	(Philippines) San Miguel Alab Pilipinas
20–26 February	(Malaysia) Wong Yi Hou	Westports Malaysia Dragons
27 February–4 March	(Malaysia) Kuek Tian Yuan	Westports Malaysia Dragons
5–12 March	(China) Luo Yongxuan	(China) Chong Son Kung Fu
13–19 March	(China) Song Shuai	(China) Chong Son Kung Fu
20–28 March	(Philippines) (United States) Bobby Ray Parks Jr.	(Philippines) San Miguel Alab Pilipinas

==== Heritage imports ====
Week	Player	Club
17–19 November	(Philippines) (Germany) Christian Standhardinger	Hong Kong Eastern
20–26 November	(Philippines) (United States) Caelan Tiongson	(China) Chong Son Kung Fu
27 November–3 December	(Philippines) Paul Zamar	(Thailand) Mono Vampire
4–10 December	(Philippines) (Germany) Christian Standhardinger	Hong Kong Eastern
11–17 December	(Thailand) (United States) Tyler Lamb	Hong Kong Eastern
18–24 December	(Thailand) (United States) Tyler Lamb	Hong Kong Eastern
2–8 January	(Thailand) (United States) Moses Morgan	(Vietnam) Saigon Heat
9–15 January	(Philippines) (United States) Mikey Williams	(Vietnam) Saigon Heat
16–22 January	(Philippines) (United States) Jason Brickman	(Thailand) Mono Vampire
23–29 January	(Philippines) (United States) Mikh McKinney	(China) Chong Son Kung Fu
30 January–5 February	(Philippines) (United States) Mikh McKinney	(China) Chong Son Kung Fu
6–12 February	(Philippines) (United States) Mikh McKinney	(China) Chong Son Kung Fu
13–19 February	(Philippines) (Germany) Christian Standhardinger	Hong Kong Eastern
20–26 February	(Philippines) (Canada) A. J. Mandani	Singapore Slingers
27 February–4 March	(Philippines) (United States) Joshua Munzon	Westports Malaysia Dragons
5–12 March	(Philippines) (United States) Mikh McKinney	(China) Chong Son Kung Fu
13–19 March	(Thailand) (Israel) (United States) Freddie Goldstein	CLS Knights Indonesia
20–28 March	(Philippines) (Germany) Christian Standhardinger	Hong Kong Eastern

==== World imports ====
Week	Player	Club
17–19 November	(United States) Marcus Elliott	Hong Kong Eastern
20–26 November	(United States) Marcus Marshall	Westports Malaysia Dragons
27 November–3 December	(United States) Xavier Alexander	Singapore Slingers
4–10 December	(United States) Lenny Daniel	(Taiwan) Formosa Dreamers
11–17 December	(United States) Xavier Alexander	Singapore Slingers
18–24 December	(United States) Patrick Sanders	(Thailand) Mono Vampire
2–8 January	(United States) Justin Brownlee	(Philippines) Tanduay Alab Pilipinas
9–15 January	(United States) Maxie Esho	(Vietnam) Saigon Heat
16–22 January	(Malta) (Italy) Samuel Deguara	(Thailand) Mono Vampire
23–29 January	(United States) Marcus Elliott	Hong Kong Eastern
30 January–5 February	(Puerto Rico) (United States) Renaldo Balkman	(Philippines) San Miguel Alab Pilipinas
6–12 February	(Puerto Rico) (United States) Renaldo Balkman	(Philippines) San Miguel Alab Pilipinas
13–19 February	(United States) Mike Singletary	(Thailand) Mono Vampire
20–26 February	(United States) Chris Charles	Singapore Slingers
27 February–4 March	(United States) Mike Singletary	(Thailand) Mono Vampire
5–12 March	(United States) Justin Howard	(China) Chong Son Kung Fu
13–19 March	(Malta) (Italy) Samuel Deguara	(Thailand) Mono Vampire
20–28 March	(United States) Justin Brownlee	(Philippines) San Miguel Alab Pilipinas

== Statistical leaders ==
=== Individual season leaders ===
Category	Player	Club	Average
Points	(United States) Erron Maxey	(Taiwan) Formosa Dreamers	34.00
Rebounds	(United States) Christien Charles	Singapore Slingers	16.27
Assists	(United States) (Philippines) Jason Brickman	(Thailand) Mono Vampire	10.43
Steals	(United States) Travele Jones	(Vietnam) Saigon Heat	3.33
Blocks	(United States) Christien Charles	Singapore Slingers	2.93
Field-goal percentage	(China) Shi Jun	(China) Chong Son Kung Fu	67%
Free-throw percentage	Multiple players	Multiple teams	100%
Three-point field-goal percentage	(Singapore) Delvin Goh (Malta) (Italy) Samuel Deguara (Vietnam) Nguyen Huynh Hai	Singapore Slingers (Thailand) Mono Vampire (Vietnam) Saigon Heat	100%
Minutes	(United States) Xavier Alexander	Singapore Slingers	39.60
Fouls	(United States) Bryan Davis	Westports Malaysia Dragons	4.14
