= Renaldo Balkman =

Puerto Rican basketball player (born 1984)

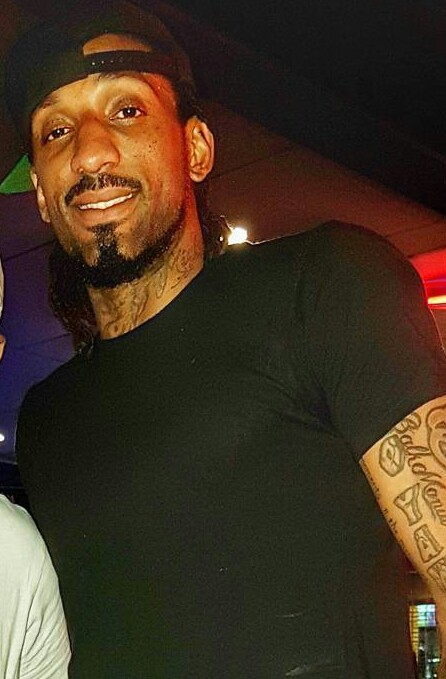
- Balkman in 2016

Free agent
- Position: Small forward / power forward

Personal information
- Born: July 14, 1984 (age 42) Staten Island, New York, U.S.
- Listed height: 6 ft 7 in (2.01 m)
- Listed weight: 212 lb (96 kg)

Career information
- High school: Laurinburg Institute (Laurinburg, North Carolina)
- College: South Carolina (2003–2006)
- NBA draft: 2006: 1st round, 20th overall pick
- Drafted by: New York Knicks
- Playing career: 2006–present

Career history
- 2006–2008: New York Knicks
- 2008–2011: Denver Nuggets
- 2011–2012: New York Knicks
- 2013: Petron Blaze Boosters
- 2013: Guaiqueríes de Margarita
- 2013: Brujos de Guayama
- 2013–2014: Halcones Rojos Veracruz
- 2014–2015: Capitanes de Arecibo
- 2014–2015: Texas Legends
- 2015: Fuerza Regia
- 2016–2017: Reales de la Vega
- 2018: San Miguel Alab Pilipinas
- 2018: San Miguel Beermen
- 2018–2019: San Miguel Alab Pilipinas
- 2019–2020: Capitanes de Arecibo
- 2020–2024: Mets de Guaynabo
- 2021–2022: Real Estelí
- 2023: Zamboanga Valientes
- 2025–2026: Vaqueros de Bayamón

Career highlights
- LNBP champion (2014); LNBP Player of the Year (2014); LNBP Defensive Player of the Year (2014); 3x BSN champion (2016, 2025, 2026); 2x BSN Finals MVP (2016, 2026); ABL champion (2018); ABL Defensive Player of the Year (2018); National Invitation Tournament MVP (2006); SEC All-Freshman Team (2004); Central American and Caribbean Games MVP (2010); William Jones Cup MVP (2019)
- Stats at NBA.com
- Stats at Basketball Reference
Medals
Men's basketball
Representing Puerto Rico
Pan American Games
Gold medal – first place	2011 Mexico
FIBA AmeriCup
Silver medal – second place	2013 Venezuela
Centrobasket
Gold medal – first place	2010 Santo Domingo
Gold medal – first place	2016 Panama City
Central American and Caribbean Games
Gold medal – first place	2010 Mayagüez

Renaldo Miguel Balkman (born July 14, 1984) is a Puerto Rican professional basketball player who last played for Vaqueros de Bayamón of the Baloncesto Superior Nacional (BSN). He played college basketball for the University of South Carolina before being selected with the 20th overall pick of the 2006 NBA draft by the New York Knicks. After spending six seasons with the Knicks and the Denver Nuggets in the National Basketball Association (NBA), since the 2012–13 season, he has been playing internationally. He has represented the Puerto Rican national team.

== Early life and education ==
Balkman was born in Staten Island, New York, and prior to attending Laurinburg Institute, he was at IMG Academy in Bradenton, Florida. At Laurinburg, he led his team to 40–2 record and No. 1 national prep school ranking.

== College career ==
=== Recruitment ===
Balkman was a little known player in high school at the Laurinburg Institute, but he was discovered in 2002 by University of South Carolina head coach Dave Odom, who instantly saw his potential. According to Odom, "I remember the first time I saw Renaldo Balkman. I was sitting in Orlando in a gym with (South Carolina assistant coach) Barry Sanderson and I asked him 'who is that kid with the dreadlocks? That's the guy we need'. He came back and said nobody knows his name." Balkman was recruited and signed by Carolina, having received little to no interest from any other major basketball programs.

=== Playing career ===
Balkman played an integral role in South Carolina's two wins over eventual national champion Florida during the 2005–06 college basketball season. He was also the 2006 NIT Most Valuable Player, averaging 9.6 points, 6.3 rebounds, 1.9 assists, 1.7 steals and 1.3 blocks per game. Balkman's highlight for the season was a team-leading 28-point, 16-rebound, 4-steal performance in a 67–56 win over Alabama on February 14, 2006. He was 11 of 15 from the field and also had a team-high 2 blocks.

For Balkman, a defensive banger whose style Knicks general manager Isiah Thomas had likened to Dennis Rodman and Ron Artest, the 2006 NIT MVP award was a fitting capper to a three-year college career that produced 7.4 points, 5.3 rebounds and a .553 shooting average.

== Professional career ==
=== NBA draft ===
The Knicks' choice of Balkman in the first round surprised many, notably ESPN's Jay Bilas, who noted that projected lottery pick Marcus Williams was still available as well as future All-Star guard Rajon Rondo. ESPN columnist Bill Simmons, among others, joked that perhaps Isiah Thomas thought he was drafting Rolando Blackman, a former Knicks player and NBA All-Star. However, other analysts praised Balkman's work ethic and attitude, as he had transformed himself from a relatively unknown player into a first-round NBA draft pick over the course of a few months. There was further controversy when Thomas claimed that the Phoenix Suns were prepared to take him; the Suns claimed that he was not even "on [their] radar". In the NBA's official draft guide, which was released to all reporters covering the draft, Balkman was not included in the list of the 300 top players eligible to be drafted in the 2006–07 rookie class. However, the Knicks selected Balkman with their first of two draft picks, which was 20th overall. The Knicks later selected Mardy Collins with the 29th pick. It has also been speculated that Thomas and the Knicks selected Balkman because his agent, Andre Buck, who worked with Leon Rose, who was the agent of the then soon-to-be free agent LeBron James.

In the Las Vegas Summer League before the 2006–07 season, Balkman averaged 7.6 points, 4.2 rebounds, 1.8 assists, 1.4 steals, 1 block and 2.4 turnovers during the span of 5 games. He played along Knick teammates Channing Frye, David Lee, Nate Robinson and Mardy Collins, also represented by Buck.

=== New York Knicks ===
During his first season, Balkman played in 68 games, averaging 15.6 minutes, 4.9 points, and 4.3 rebounds. He logged four double-doubles and showed promise, particularly on the defensive end where he was called upon to guard multiple positions, from shooting guard to center. The press praised Balkman, describing him as a "sparkplug off the bench" and a "crowd favorite for his hustle and enthusiastic defense," though he was criticized for his poor outside shooting. Balkman also led the league's rookies in steals plus blocks per 48 minutes.

The 2007–08 season saw a decline in most of Balkman's stats. He played in 65 games, averaging 14.6 minutes, 3.4 points, and 3.3 rebounds per game.

=== Denver Nuggets ===
On July 28, 2008, Balkman was traded to the Denver Nuggets along with cash considerations in exchange for Taurean Green, Bobby Jones, and a second-round pick in the 2010 draft. The Knicks quickly waived both Green and Jones, solidifying the fact that the deal was a salary dump. Knicks coach Mike D'Antoni stated, "Renaldo really had no role after we drafted (Danilo) Gallinari, and with the emergence of Wilson Chandler his minutes would be nonexistent, so it really wasn’t fair to him to keep him in a spot that he wouldn’t play and also gives us an opportunity to clear up a roster spot and move on." Said Balkman, "I'm going to make the best of my opportunity. New York was great, but that's in my past now. Denver is my future."

During the 2008–09 season, Balkman played in 53 games, averaging 5.0 points and 3.8 rebounds per game. He also started 10 games, after Kenyon Martin was injured. His best game was on March 14, 2009, against the Los Angeles Clippers. Balkman scored a double-double, with 22 points, 11 rebounds, and 2 blocks.

Balkman barely played during the 2009–10 season, averaging 1.1 points and 1.8 rebounds in 7 minutes per game. He only played in 13 games, never scoring in double figures.

Balkman again began the 2010–11 season as part of the Nuggets bench. He was scarcely used, playing in only 5 games, and averaging 2.6 points and 0.8 rebounds per game. His most notable game was on December 29, 2010, against the Minnesota Timberwolves, where he scored 10 points in 19 minutes, including four dunks.

=== Back to New York ===
On February 22, 2011, Balkman was reacquired by the New York Knicks in a blockbuster trade which also brought Carmelo Anthony, Chauncey Billups, Shelden Williams, and Anthony Carter to New York. However, Balkman only played in three games after returning to New York.

Balkman rarely saw game time during the 2011–12 season, playing only in 14 games, and averaging 3 points and 1.9 rebounds per game. He was released by the team on February 17, 2012, to make room on the roster for J. R. Smith.

=== Philippines ===
On January 9, 2013, Balkman signed with the Petron Blaze Boosters of the Philippine Basketball Association to play in the 2013 Commissioner's Cup.

On March 8, 2013, in a game against the Alaska Aces for a battle to earn the top spot, Balkman had a major outburst when he claimed he was fouled after shooting an airball inside the paint. Balkman argued with the referees, but when his argument was ignored, he shoved referees and pushed coaches and teammates that tried to calm him. After physically confronting the first referee, assistant coach Biboy Ravanes tried to calm him down but Balkman shoved Ravanes out of the way. After this, he moved to the second referee and again argued and initiated contact. At this point, Ronald Tubid, a teammate of Balkman, tried to get between him and the second referee. Balkman then moved to the third official, while being shadowed by Tubid, until he shoved Tubid out of the way. This is when another teammate, Arwind Santos, tried to intervene by putting himself between the third referee and Balkman. However, Balkman continued with his aggressive behavior, slapping Santos' arm and eventually shoving him. When Santos pushed him back, Balkman pushed him once again and then grabbed Santos' neck as their teammates tried to separate them. Balkman later apologized via his Twitter account. He said he apologized to his teammates, Santos and Santos' family as well as the team's management, and added, "Everybody does something once in a life, they're not supposed to do. At the time I blanked out and went at it. [...] It's my first time ever in my entire life to do that."

On March 11, 2013, Balkman was banned from the PBA. He was also fined P250,000. In seven games for Petron, Balkman averaged 25 points, 13.4 rebounds, 2.4 assists and 2.7 blocks per game.

On March 27, 2018, the lifetime ban was lifted by the PBA, after gaining the approval from Santos, former commissioner Chito Salud and incumbent commissioner Willie Marcial.

=== Latin America ===
On March 27, 2013, Balkman signed with Guaiqueríes de Margarita of the Liga Profesional de Baloncesto. He left Guaiqueríes after 13 games.

On May 1, 2013, Balkman signed with Brujos de Guayama of the Baloncesto Superior Nacional.

On September 30, 2013, Balkman signed with the Dallas Mavericks. However, he was later waived by the Mavericks on October 22, 2013.

In December 2013, Balkman signed with Halcones Rojos Veracruz of Mexico for the rest of the 2013–14 season.

In April 2014, Balkman joined Capitanes de Arecibo for the 2014 BSN season.

=== Texas Legends ===
On October 24, 2014, Balkman re-signed with the Dallas Mavericks, only to be waived the next day. On November 3, 2014, he was acquired by the Texas Legends as an affiliate player.

=== Puerto Rico / Mexico ===
On March 8, 2015, Balkman left Texas and returned to Capitanes de Arecibo.

On December 15, 2015, Balkman left Arecibo to sign with Fuerza Regia of the Mexican League, but was released on December 28 after leaving the club without notification.

=== Return to the Philippines ===
On January 1, 2018, Balkman returned to the Philippines, playing for ASEAN Basketball League side San Miguel Alab Pilipinas. He, together with Barangay Ginebra import Justin Brownlee replaced Reggie Okosa and Ivan Johnson (who, like Balkman, had a controversial stint in the country's domestic league, the PBA, and was also once banned from) as imports for the team.

=== Latin America ===
On January 19, 2021, Balkman signed with Real Estalí of Nicaragua in the 2nd season of the BCL Americas.

=== ABL invitational ===
In February 2023, Balkman signed with Zamboanga Valientes to play at the ASEAN Basketball League invitational tournament.

=== Vaqueros de Bayamón (2025-2026) ===
On February 16, 2026, Balkman signed with the Vaqueros de Bayamón of the Baloncesto Superior Nacional. After being waived by the Mets de Guaynabo, Balkman joined the team in a reserve role for the 2025 season, primarily serving as a backup to center JaVale McGee. In a reduced role off the bench, Balkman contributed to the team’s championship run, helping the team capture the 2025 title.

During the 2025 BSN offseason, Balkman signed a two-year contract extension with the Vaqueros de Bayamón. In April 2026, he made his season debut as a starter, with Bayamón beginning the season without its import players.

On August 15, during the 2026 BSN Finals, Balkman recorded 15 points and 10 rebounds off the bench, providing a significant contribution for Bayamón. In Game 7 of the 2026 BSN Finals, Balkman recorded a late block on Joel Soriano that helped seal Bayamón’s 81–74 victory and a back-to-back championship. Following the game, Balkman was named BSN Finals MVP.

== National team career ==
=== 2010 Centrobasket ===
In the 2010 Centrobasket held in the Dominican Republic, Balkman helped Puerto Rico win the gold medal after defeating Dominican Republic 89–80. Balkman was the top rebounder for Puerto Rico, with eight.

=== 2010 Central American Games ===
In the 2010 Central American and Caribbean Games held in Mayagüez, Puerto Rico, Balkman helped Puerto Rico defeat Mexico 82–77 to win the gold medal.

=== 2011 Pan American Games ===
In the 2011 Pan American Games held in Guadalajara, Mexico, Balkman helped Puerto Rico defeat Mexico 74–72 to win the gold medal. He recorded 28 points and 12 rebounds in the win.

=== 2013 FIBA Americas Championship ===
Balkman played at the 2013 FIBA Americas Championship, where he won a silver medal. He was named to the All-Tournament Team.

== Career statistics ==
Legend
GP	Games played	GS	Games started	MPG	Minutes per game
FG%	Field goal percentage	3P%	3-point field goal percentage	FT%	Free throw percentage
RPG	Rebounds per game	APG	Assists per game	SPG	Steals per game
BPG	Blocks per game	PPG	Points per game	**Bold**	Career high

=== NBA ===
==== Regular season ====
Year	Team	GP	GS	MPG	FG%	3P%	FT%	RPG	APG	SPG	BPG	PPG
2006–07	New York	**68**	1	**15.6**	.505	.185	.567	**4.3**	**.6**	.8	**.6**	4.9
2007–08	New York	65	0	14.6	.489	.083	.432	3.3	**.6**	.7	.5	3.4
2008–09	Denver	53	**10**	14.7	**.558**	.286	.646	3.8	**.6**	**.9**	.4	**5.0**
2009–10	Denver	13	1	7.0	.333	.000	.333	1.8	.5	.6	.2	1.1
2010–11	Denver	5	0	8.8	.556	.000	**.750**	.8	.4	.6	.4	2.6
2010–11	New York	3	0	6.0	.250	**.500**	.000	1.0	.0	.3	.0	1.0
2011–12	New York	14	0	8.2	.500	.222	.727	1.9	.4	.3	.2	3.0
Career		221	12	13.9	.510	.172	.542	3.5	.6	.7	.5	4.0

==== Playoffs ====
Year	Team	GP	GS	MPG	FG%	3P%	FT%	RPG	APG	SPG	BPG	PPG
2009	Denver	8	0	2.5	.333	.000	.000	.5	.1	.5	.0	.5

=== Domestic leagues ===
Season	Team	League	GP	MPG	FG%	3P%	FT%	RPG	APG	SPG	BPG	PPG
2013	Petron Blaze Boosters	PBA	7	39.9	.458	–	.590	13.4	2.4	2.0	2.7	25.0
2013	Guaiqueríes de Margarita	Venezuela LPB	13	31.4	.532	.273	.648	8.6	1.1	2.4	1.0	18.4
2013	Brujos de Guayama	BSN	31	30.9	.543	.429	.699	8.8	2.0	1.7	1.3	17.0
2013–14	Halcones Rojos Veracruz	Mexico LNPB	24	33.5	.516	.222	.725	8.2	2.3	1.9	2.0	22.0
2014	Capitanes de Arecibo	BSN	37	32.8	.577	.143	.660	9.1	1.8	1.5	1.9	17.1
2014–15	Texas Legends	D-League	32	29.6	.641	.276	.643	9.2	1.2	2.1	.9	16.0
2015	Capitanes de Arecibo	BSN	52	28.1	.564	.194	.646	7.2	1.7	1.3	1.2	15.7
