= Samuel Deguara =

Maltese basketball player (born 1991)

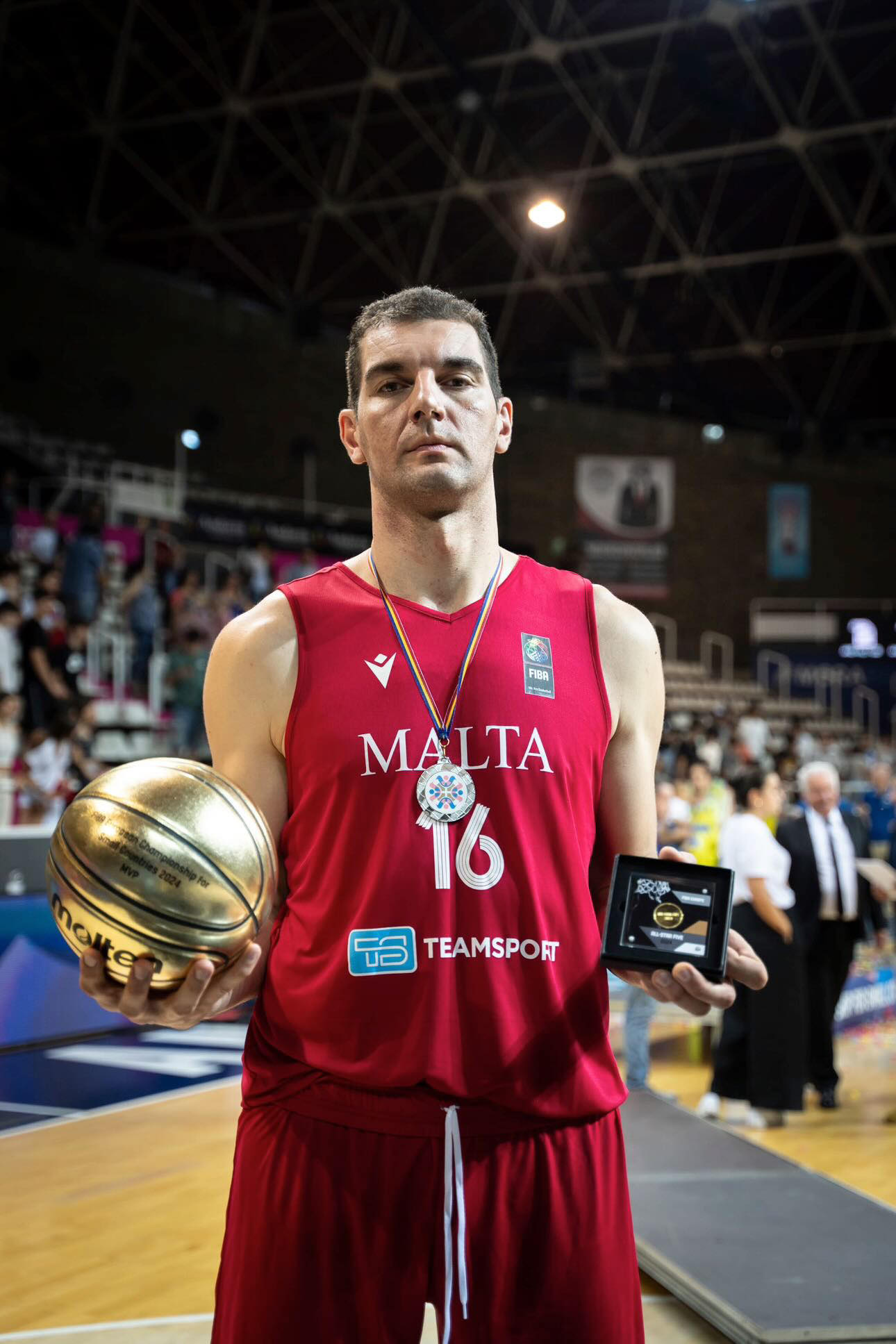

No. 22 – Free agent
- Position: Center

Personal information
- Born: 21 June 1991 (age 35) Pietà, Malta
- Listed height: 7 ft 6.5 in (2.30 m)
- Listed weight: 288 lb (131 kg)

Career information
- Playing career: 2007–present

Career history
- 2007–2010: Pallacanestro Treviso
- 2010–2011: →BVO Caorle
- 2011–2012: →CUS Bari Pallacanestro
- 2012–2013: Pallacanestro Reggiana
- 2013–2014: BUPA Luxol
- 2014: Viten Getafe
- 2014–2015: Fuenlabrada
- 2014–2015: →Fundacion Fuenlabrada
- 2015: Ferrol
- 2016: Niagara River Lions
- 2017: BUPA Luxol
- 2017: Farmcochem
- 2017: PEA
- 2018: Mono Vampire
- 2018–2019: Hong Kong Eastern
- 2019: CEB Puerto Montt
- 2019–2020: San Miguel Alab Pilipinas
- 2020–2021: Tokyo Excellence
- 2021–2022: Taipei Fubon Braves
- 2022: TaiwanBeer HeroBears
- 2022–2024: Tainan TSG GhostHawks
- 2023: Hong Kong Bulls
- 2024–2026: Macau Black Bears
- 2026: Yankey Ark

Career highlights
- Malta Basketball League champion (2017); Malaysia Pro League champion (2017); FIBA Europe U-18 Championship Division C MVP (2009); TBL Best Center Award (2017); TBSL champion (2018); European Championship for Small Countries MVP (2018)
Medals
Men's basketball
Representing Malta
FIBA Europe U-18 Championship Division C
Gold medal – first place	2009 Valletta	Team
Representing Malta
FIBA European Championship for Small Countries
Gold medal – first place	2018 San Marino	Team
Silver medal – second place	2010 Valletta	Team
Silver medal – second place	2014 Gibraltar	Team
Silver medal – second place	2024 Andorra la Vella	Team
Bronze medal – third place	2012 Serravale	Team

Samuel Deguara (born 21 June 1991) is a Maltese professional basketball player who last played for the Yankey Ark of the P. League+.

== Professional career ==
=== Beginnings in Italy ===
Deguara began his professional career after signing a nine-year contract with Benetton Treviso, breaking through the club's youth ranks. After three years, Deguara was loaned to fellow Italian sides BVO Caorle and CUS Bari Pallacanestro over the course of the next two years. The following season, he played for Pallacanestro Reggiana in the Serie A, playing a single game against Armani Milano.

=== Malta ===
After an injury-plagued spell in Italy, Deguara decided to return to his native Malta, signing up for BUPA Luxol for the 2013–2014 season. It was a successful stint for Deguara, where he averaged 29.5 points and 21.4 rebounds per game.

=== Spain ===
After his stint in his native country, Deguara set out to Spain to continue his basketball career. He first played for Viten Getafe, scoring 5 points and 6 rebounds in 10 minutes of action. After Getafe, Deguara continued his stint in Spain, playing for Fuenlabrada and also for its reserve team. Deguara also played for Ferrol, where he tallied 17 points, 17 rebounds and 3 blocks in his debut and averaged 15.0 points and 11.0 rebounds a game.

=== North America ===
Deguara continued his basketball career in America, where he was selected 98th overall in the sixth round by the Erie Bayhawks in the 2015 NBA Development League Draft. However, Deguara did not play a single game for the BayHawks.

Deguara was then signed by newly-formed NBL Canada side Niagara River Lions. Despite his much-publicized and highly hyped signing with the Canadian club, he was largely absent from the team's debut campaign in the NBLC, playing in only 3 games for a total of 7 minutes, scoring only 2 points in all games.

=== Lithuania ===
Deguara signed a contract with Lithuanian side BC Šilutė, playing in the Lithuanian second tier, the NKL.

=== Return to Malta ===
Deguara returned to his native Malta for the second time, again playing for BUPA Luxol. He led the club to its 13th Maltese championship, where they swept fellow Maltese club Floriana MCP Car Parks in a best-of-five series.

=== Southeast Asia ===
Deguara headed to Asia for the first time in his career, where he signed with Malaysian NBL side Farmcochem, winning the Malaysia Pro League title in his only season with the club, scoring 24 points and 24 rebounds in the championship game against the KL Dragons.

Shortly after his stint in Malaysia, Deguara was signed by another Southeast Asian club, PEA, of Thailand.

In January 2018, Deguara was signed by another Thai club and ASEAN Basketball League side Mono Vampire, where he replaced Reggie Johnson, who left the team for personal reasons.

Deguara returned to the Southeast Asian league with San Miguel Alab Pilipinas, replacing Adrian Forbes as the team's third import.

=== Taiwan ===
On 21 March 2022, Deguara signed with the TaiwanBeer HeroBears of the T1 League. On 9 August, Deguara signed with the Tainan TSG GhostHawks of the T1 League.

=== Hong Kong ===
On 14 June 2023, Deguara signed with the Hong Kong Bulls of the National Basketball League.

=== Return to Taiwan ===
On 8 September 2023, Deguara re-signed with the Tainan TSG GhostHawks. On 27 January 2024, the Tainan TSG GhostHawks terminated the contract relationship with Deguara.

=== Macau ===
On 13 September 2024, Deguara signed with the Macau Black Bears of the East Asia Super League for the 2024–25 season.

=== The Asian Tournament ===
He played for the Taiwan Mustangs, Aces, and Philippine Aces United in the 2024, 2025, and 2026 editions, respectively.

=== Zamboanga Valientes ===
He played for Zamboanga Valientes during the 34th edition of the Dubai Basketball Championship, and the Governor Hofer Invitational Basketball Championship in Zamboanga Sibugay.

== National team career ==
Deguara is the tallest player on the Malta national basketball team, and has been in the national set-up since he was 14. Deguara was also part of the Malta national team that won the Division C of the FIBA Europe Under-18 Championship on home soil in 2009, where he averaged 27.2 points and 23.8 rebounds per game. Deguara also played for the medal-winning teams of Malta that took part in the 2010, 2012 and 2014 European Championships for Small Countries, winning bronze, another bronze and silver medals, respectively, in these events.

In 2018, he helped Malta to win the tournament and achieved the MVP title despite only averaging 17.9 minutes of playtime per game.

== Playing style ==
He is noted for his rebounding ability and his passing from the post position.
