= Reggie Johnson (basketball, born 1989) =

American basketball player

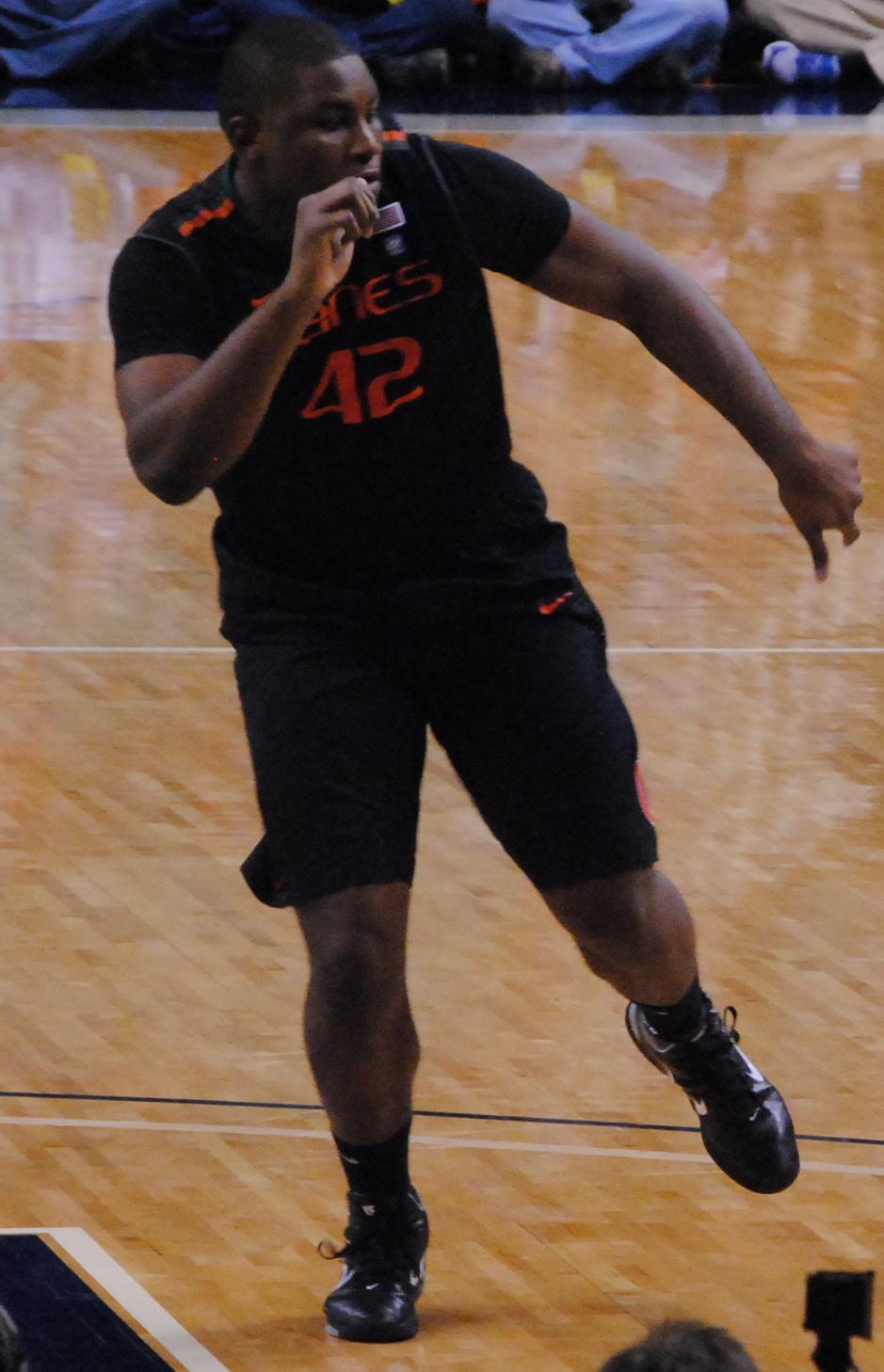
- Johnson playing for Miami in 2011

Personal information
- Born: December 16, 1989 (age 36) Winston-Salem, North Carolina, U.S.
- Listed height: 6 ft 10 in (2.08 m)
- Listed weight: 290 lb (132 kg)

Career information
- High school: Winston-Salem Prep (Winston-Salem, North Carolina)
- College: Miami (Florida) (2008–2013)
- NBA draft: 2013: undrafted
- Playing career: 2013–2020
- Position: Center
- Number: 41, 42

Career history
- 2013–2014: Delaware 87ers
- 2014–2015: SPM Shoeters Den Bosch
- 2015–2016: Westports Malaysia Dragons
- 2016–2018: Mono Vampire
- 2018: Rain or Shine Elasto Painters
- 2020: Dunkin' Raptors

Career highlights
- 2× Thailand League champion (2016, 2017); Thailand Basketball Super League champion (2017); ASEAN League champion (2016); ASEAN League World Import MVP (2016); Dutch League champion (2015); Dutch League All-Star (2015); Dutch Supercup champion (2015)

Reginald Denard Johnson (born December 16, 1989) is an American former basketball player. He played college basketball for the Miami Hurricanes.

== Professional career ==
In October 2014, Johnson signed with SPM Shoeters Den Bosch of the DBL.

In November 2015, he signed with the Malaysian team Westports Malaysia Dragons of the ASEAN Basketball League.

In June 2016, Johnson returned to Southeast Asia, this time to Thailand to play for the Mono Vampire of the Thailand Basketball League. However, at early January 2018, Johnson left the club to return to the United States for personal reasons. He was eventually replaced by Maltese-Italian Samuel Deguara.

In March 2018, Johnson signed with the Rain or Shine Elasto Painters of the Philippine Basketball Association as their import for the 2018 PBA Commissioner's Cup.

== Statistics ==
Season	Team	League	PPG	RPG	APG	EFF
2014–15	SPM Shoeters Den Bosch	DBL	12.4	8.3	1.8	16.9
