= Bobby Ray Parks Jr. =

Filipino-American basketball player (born 1993)

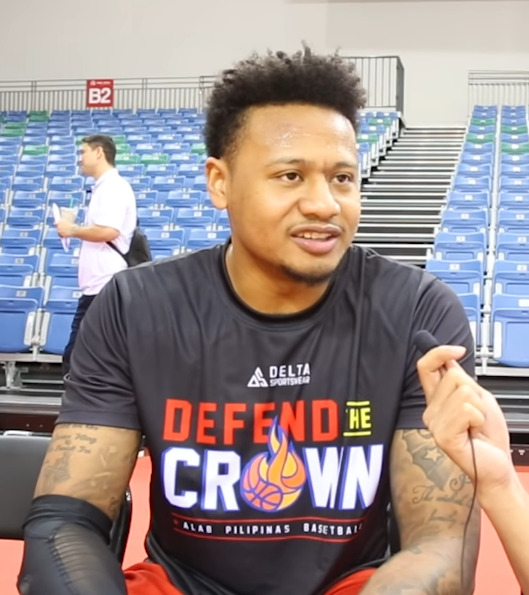
- Parks in 2019

No. 1 – Ibaraki Robots
- Position: Shooting guard / point guard
- League: B.League

Personal information
- Born: February 19, 1993 (age 33) Parañaque, Philippines
- Listed height: 6 ft 4 in (1.93 m)
- Listed weight: 215 lb (98 kg)

Career information
- High school: St. George's (Collierville, Tennessee); Melrose (Memphis, Tennessee)
- College: NU (2011–2013)
- NBA draft: 2015: undrafted
- PBA draft: 2018: 1st round, 2nd overall pick
- Drafted by: Blackwater Elite
- Playing career: 2015–present

Career history
- 2015–2016: Texas Legends
- 2016–2019: San Miguel Alab Pilipinas
- 2018: Mandaluyong El Tigre
- 2019: Blackwater Elite
- 2019–2020: TNT Tropang Giga
- 2021–2024: Nagoya Diamond Dolphins
- 2024–2026: Osaka Evessa
- 2026–present: Ibaraki Robots

Career highlights
- PBA All-Rookie Team (2019); ABL champion (2018); ABL Finals MVP (2018); 3× ABL Local MVP (2017, 2018, 2019); Japan B-League Most Impressive Asia Player Award (2025); Japan B-League B1 Western Conference Champion (2023–2024); 2× UAAP Most Valuable Player (2011, 2012); 3× UAAP Mythical Five (2011–2013); Tennessee Mr. Basketball Division II A (2009); SEABA Most Valuable Player (2015)

Bobby Ray Barbosa Parks Jr. (born February 19, 1993) is a Filipino-American professional basketball player for the Ibaraki Robots of the B.League. A 6 feet 4 inches (1.93 meters) tall guard, he played college basketball for the NU Bulldogs for three years before declaring for the 2015 NBA draft, where he went undrafted.

== Early life ==
Parks was born on February 19, 1993, in Parañaque, Metro Manila, to Marifer Celine Barbosa, a Filipina, and Bobby Ray Parks Sr., an African American professional basketball player who was then active in the Philippine Basketball Association (PBA). Parks Sr. had been drafted 58th overall in the third round of the 1984 NBA draft, and went on to become a seven-time Philippine Basketball Association (PBA) Best Import awardee and Hall of Famer.

Parks Sr. and Barbosa separated. Barbosa moved to Los Angeles, California, in 2003, while Parks Sr. left for Memphis, Tennessee, in 2005. Parks and his younger sister, Celine, remained in the Philippines until 2006, when his sister went to live with their mother, while he went to live with his father and his stepfamily, who were also Filipino. After moving to Memphis, Parks started playing organized basketball at the age of 13.

As a freshman and sophomore, Parks attended St. George's Independent School in Collierville, Tennessee, where he was named Tennessee's Division II-A Mr. Basketball as the state's private school player of the year in 2009. He transferred to Melrose High School for the 2009–10 season and helped his team win a class AAA state championship. In November 2010, he committed to Georgia Tech as the No. 31-ranked shooting guard in the class of 2011, but later decommitted and followed his father back to the Philippines.

College recruiting
Name	Hometown	School	Height	Weight	Commit date
Bobby Parks Jr. SG	Memphis, Tennessee	Melrose High School	6 ft 4 in (1.93 m)	195 lb (88 kg)	Nov 22, 2010
Bobby Parks Jr. SG	Recruit ratings: Rivals: 247Sports: ESPN: (92)				
Overall recruit ranking:
Note: In many cases, Scout, Rivals, 247Sports, On3, and ESPN may conflict in their listings of height and weight.; In these cases, the average was taken. ESPN grades are on a 100-point scale.; Sources: "2011 Georgia Tech Player Commits". ESPN.; "2011 Team Ranking". Rivals.

== College career ==
In September 2010, Parks enrolled in information technology at National University in Manila with the hopes of playing for the NU Bulldogs in 2011. Since he came from a foreign high school, he had to sit out one year before the 2011 season, which prevented him from winning Rookie of the Year as UAAP rules only allow for true freshmen to win the award. Nonetheless, he still qualified for the MVP award, which he eventually won during his first University Athletic Association of the Philippines (UAAP) season with the Bulldogs, as he averaged 20.0 points, 6.5 rebounds, 2.9 assists, 1.1 blocks and 1.1 steals per game and was named the Most Valuable Player (MVP) of seasons 74 and 75.

== Professional career ==
In 2015, Parks was in pursuit of becoming the first Philippine-born player to play in the National Basketball Association (NBA). He became automatically eligible for the 2015 NBA draft as an international player who turned 22 during the calendar year of the draft. In June 2015, prior to the 2015 NBA draft, he was invited to work out with the Utah Jazz, Brooklyn Nets, Dallas Mavericks, Atlanta Hawks and Boston Celtics.

Parks went undrafted, but received an invitation from the Dallas Mavericks to play for their Summer League team. In six games for Dallas, he averaged 3.0 points and 1.7 rebounds per game, becoming the first Philippine-born player to play in the Summer League.

=== NBA D-League ===
On October 31, 2015, Parks was selected by the Texas Legends in the second round of the 2015 NBA Development League Draft. He became the second Filipino to be drafted in the NBA D-League after Japeth Aguilar in 2012.

Parks made his debut with the Legends on November 23, 2015, against the Austin Spurs. He went scoreless in 10 minutes of play and went 0-of-2 from the field. On December 13, 2015, he scored his first basket for the Legends. His putback layup with 14.5 seconds remaining gave him his first-ever basket in the D-League. He also finished with one assist and three rebounds in six minutes of action against the Sioux Falls Skyforce. On April 1, 2016, he scored a career-high 16 points against the Oklahoma City Blue. In 2015–16, he averaged 4.6 points and 1.9 rebounds in 32 games.

After the Legends did not retain Parks for the 2016–17 season, he entered the 2016 NBA Development League Draft, where he was selected in the sixth round by the Westchester Knicks. He was unsuccessful in gaining an opening-night roster spot with Westchester, as the team waived him on November 9, 2016.

=== ASEAN Basketball League ===
On November 18, 2016, Parks officially joined Alab Pilipinas of the ASEAN Basketball League (ABL). On December 11, 2016, he scored a career-high 41 points and 14 rebounds against the Kaohsiung Truth. After his first season with Alab Pilipinas, he was named the local MVP of the season.

=== MPBL ===
After his stint in the ABL, Parks joined the Maharlika Pilipinas Basketball League (MPBL), an amateur regional league in the Philippines which imposes a cap on imports, including Filipinos with foreign heritage like himself. He was signed in by Mandaluyong El Tigre in May 2018.

=== PBA ===
==== Blackwater Elite ====
Parks entered the 2018 PBA draft where he was selected by Blackwater Elite. He was the second overall pick for that draft.

==== TNT Tropang Giga ====
Parks was traded to the TNT Tropang Giga from Blackwater Elite in November 2019 in the middle of the 2019 PBA Governors' Cup. With TNT, he had his first semifinal run, only for his team to lose to eventual finalist Meralco Bolts. After the conclusion of the 2019 season, he signed a new one-year deal with TNT in February 2020. In the Philippine Cup, which was the lone conference for the 2020 season, he helped TNT to its first "All-Filipino" finals in seven years, only losing to eventual champions Barangay Ginebra San Miguel.

Parks Jr.'s contract with TNT expired after the 2020 season. In March 2021, he announced that he would not feature in the PBA for the 2021 season, citing personal reasons to tend to his family. However, the move risked a fallout between Parks and TNT, with team owner and PLDT chairman Manny V. Pangilinan expressing his doubts on Parks Jr.'s reason for sitting out the 2021 season through social media, posting a photo of him having a vacation in La Union. While Parks is a free agent, TNT still holds the signing rights to him; he would only be able to play for another PBA team if TNT releases him without pre-conditions or trade him.

TNT and the PBA allowed Parks to play in Japan in July 2021, but TNT would have exclusive rights to re-sign him if he decides to return to the PBA within five years.

=== B. League ===
==== Nagoya Diamond Dolphins ====
On August 24, 2021, Parks signed with the Nagoya Diamond Dolphins of Japan's B. League as the team's Asian import. On May 28, 2022, he signed a one-year contract extension with the team. On June 9, 2023, he signed another contract extension with the team. He left the team after the 2023–24 season. During his three-year stay, Nagoya had always advanced to the playoffs.

==== Osaka Evessa ====
Parks signed with another B.League team Osaka Evessa in June 2024. He was recognized as the Impressive Asia Player of the Year in the 2024–25 season. He played for two seasons with Osaka and played for them until 2026.

==== Ibaraki Robots ====
Parks joins the Ibaraki Robots in July 2026.

== National team career ==
In 2015, Parks played for Gilas Cadets at the SEABA championships and the Southeast Asian Games.

In July 2016, Parks played for Gilas Pilipinas at the FIBA Olympic Qualifying Tournament in Manila.

Parks was part of the team that represented the Philippines in the 2017 Southeast Asian Games. They won the gold medal after beating Indonesia 94–55, winning his 3rd SEA Games Gold medal in the process.

Five years later, Parks returned to the national team for the 2022 FIBA Asia Cup. The team failed to make the quarterfinals of that tournament.

Parks was included in the 21-man pool for the 2023 FIBA World Cup. However, he was not included in the 12-man final roster.

== Career statistics ==
Legend
GP	Games played	MPG	Minutes per game
FG%	Field-goal percentage	3P%	3-point field-goal percentage	FT%	Free-throw percentage
RPG	Rebounds per game	APG	Assists per game	SPG	Steals per game
BPG	Blocks per game	PPG	Points per game	**Bold**	Career high

=== UAAP ===
Year	Team	GP	MPG	FG%	3P%	FT%	RPG	APG	SPG	BPG	PPG
2011-12	NU	13	33.4	.433	**.306**	**.783**	6.5	2.9	1.2	1.1	20.8
2012-13	NU	15	**34.0**	.391	.267	.773	7.4	**4.4**	**1.5**	**1.2**	20.7
2013-14	NU	16	31.8	.364	.257	.732	**8.1**	3.7	1.3	1.1	17.8
Career		44	33.0	.392	.275	.763	7.4	3.7	1.3	1.1	19.7

=== NBA G League ===
Year	Team	GP	MPG	FG%	3P%	FT%	RPG	APG	SPG	BPG	PPG
2015–16	Texas Legends	32	13.3	.426	.194	.660	1.9	.8	.6	.1	4.6
Career		32	13.3	.426	.194	.660	1.9	.8	.6	.1	4.6

=== ASEAN Basketball League ===
Year	Team	GP	MPG	FG%	3P%	FT%	RPG	APG	SPG	BPG	PPG
2016–17	Alab	21	30.2	.456	**.419**	**.808**	**7.2**	**4.1**	.9	**.7**	**18.3**
2017–18	Alab	**29**	**31.8**	.462	.356	.733	5.2	3.5	**1.3**	**.7**	16.7
2018–19	Alab	25	29.8	**.513**	.407	.771	4.2	3.3	.8	.4	15.8
Career		75	30.7	.475	.388	.771	5.4	3.6	1.0	.6	16.9

=== Philippine Basketball Association ===
As of the end of 2020 season

Year	Team	GP	MPG	FG%	3P%	FT%	RPG	APG	SPG	BPG	PPG
2019	Blackwater	**32**	37.3	.398	.332	.761	6.3	**3.5**	1.4	.3	18.8
2019	TNT	**32**	37.3	.398	.332	.761	6.3	**3.5**	1.4	.3	18.8
2020	TNT	17	**39.7**	**.492**	**.458**	**.845**	**7.8**	3.1	**1.5**	**.4**	**22.4**
Career		49	38.1	.429	.378	.790	6.9	3.4	1.4	.3	20.0

=== B. League ===
Year	Team	GP	MPG	FG%	3P%	FT%	RPG	APG	SPG	BPG	PPG
2021–22	Nagoya	46	22.4	.467	.377	.721	3.6	1.9	1.1	.1	10.4
2022–23	Nagoya	36	24.9	.436	.361	.837	3.9	2.4	1.2	.1	11.0
2023–24	Nagoya	58	21.4	.419	.382	.830	3.7	2.1	.8	.2	8.7

== Personal life ==
On June 1, 2025, Parks married internet personality and content creator Zeinab Harake.

Preceded by RR Garcia	UAAP Men's basketball Most Valuable Player; 2011-2012	Succeeded by Terrence Romeo
Preceded by Kiefer Ravena	Filoil Flying V Preseason Hanes Cup Most Valuable Player; 2012	Succeeded by Roi Sumang
