= Ivan Johnson (basketball) =

American basketball player (born 1984)

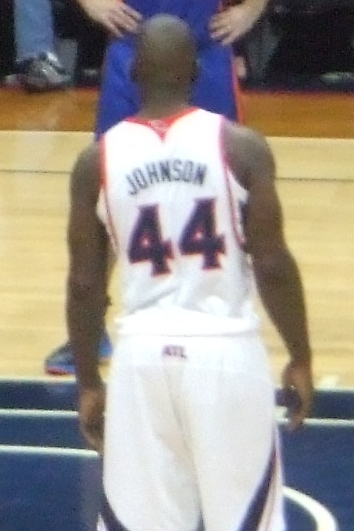
- Johnson with the Atlanta Hawks in 2012

Personal information
- Born: April 10, 1984 (age 42) San Antonio, Texas, U.S.
- Listed height: 6 ft 8 in (2.03 m)
- Listed weight: 255 lb (116 kg)

Career information
- High school: Fox Tech (San Antonio, Texas)
- College: Cisco JC (2002–2003); L.A. Southwest CC (2004–2005); Oregon (2005–2006); Cal State San Bernardino (2006–2007)
- NBA draft: 2007: undrafted
- Playing career: 2007–2019
- Position: Power forward
- Number: 44

Career history
- 2007–2008: Anaheim Arsenal
- 2008: Rio Grande Valley Vipers
- 2008–2009: Changwon LG Sakers
- 2009–2010: Jeonju KCC Egis
- 2010–2011: Erie BayHawks
- 2011: Caciques de Humacao
- 2011: Qingdao DoubleStar
- 2011–2013: Atlanta Hawks
- 2013–2014: Zhejiang Golden Bulls
- 2014–2015: Texas Legends
- 2015: Talk 'N Text Tropang Texters
- 2015: RETAbet.es GBC
- 2016: Tropang TNT
- 2016: Caciques de Humacao
- 2016: Reales de La Vega
- 2016: Sagesse
- 2017: Tanduay Alab Pilipinas
- 2019: Huracanes de Tampico

Career highlights
- PBA champion (2015 Commissioner's); CBA steals leader (2014); NBA D-League All-Star (2011); All-NBA D-League First Team (2011); NBA D-League All-Defensive Second Team (2011)
- Stats at NBA.com
- Stats at Basketball Reference

Ivan Wilkerson Johnson (born April 10, 1984) is an American former professional basketball player. He played college basketball for Cisco College, L.A. Southwest JC, Oregon and Cal State San Bernardino.

Johnson is currently playing in the 3-on-3 basketball league BIG3 playing for Ghost Ballers.

== College career ==
Johnson played college basketball for four different colleges, including two junior colleges, Cisco Junior College in Texas and Los Angeles Southwest College, where he averaged 22.3 points, 12.2 rebounds and 2.4 blocks per game as a sophomore. He then transferred to the University of Oregon on a scholarship before finishing his college career at Cal State San Bernardino.

== Professional career ==
=== NBA D-League and Korean Basketball League (2007–2010) ===
Johnson began his professional career in the NBA D-League where he played for the Anaheim Arsenal and Rio Grande Valley Vipers from 2007–2008. After that, he played in the Korean Basketball League (KBL) with the Changwon LG Sakers and Jeonju KCC Egis from 2008–2010. He was "banned forever" from the KBL for directing the middle-finger gesture at a referee during the final game of the championship series. After the game, the KBL held a meeting and also decided to fine Johnson US$4,448.

=== Atlanta Hawks (2011–2012) ===
On December 9, 2011, Johnson signed with the Atlanta Hawks. On April 13, 2012, Johnson was sent home and fined an undisclosed amount of money for "conduct detrimental to the team." Just three days later on April 16, 2012, Johnson scored a career high 21 points against the Toronto Raptors.

On May 12, 2012, the NBA fined Johnson $25,000 for gesturing, again with his middle finger, at a Boston Celtics fan following the Hawks’ elimination from the playoffs.

On September 18, 2012, Johnson signed a one-year deal to return to the Atlanta Hawks.

=== Zhejiang Golden Bulls (2013) ===
In August 2013, Johnson signed with the Zhejiang Golden Bulls in China.

=== Brief return to Dallas (2014) ===
On July 29, 2014, Johnson signed with the Dallas Mavericks. However, he was later waived by the Mavericks on October 25, 2014. On December 5, 2014, he was acquired by the Texas Legends of the NBA Development League. On February 6, 2015, he was waived by Texas.

=== Talk 'N Text (2015) ===
On February 18, 2015, Johnson signed with Talk 'N Text Tropang Texters of the Philippine Basketball Association. On April 29, 2015, he helped the Texters to win the 2015 PBA Commissioner's Cup.

=== RETAbet.es GBC (2015) ===
In September 2015, Johnson signed with RETAbet.es GBC of Spain for the 2015–16 season. Though, in October he had to leave the team.

=== Return to Talk 'N Text / Tropang TNT (2016) ===
On January 13, 2016, Johnson signed once again with the defending champion Tropang TNT as the team's import for the 2016 PBA Commissioner's Cup. Days before the Commissioner's Cup, he was figured in a brawl with two players of Blackwater Elite in the team's tune-up game in Moro Lorenzo Gym. Johnson was suspended for one game and fined 50,000 pesos after the incident.

On February 13, 2016, Johnson was "banned for life" from the PBA and fined 250,000 pesos after he disrespected and cursed the PBA commissioner Chito Narvasa during their game against Meralco Bolts, earlier in the game he was called for a technical foul for second motion on Meralco's Forward/Center Kelly Nabong and a flagrant foul one penalty after he gave an elbow to the face of Meralco's Forward/Center Bryan Faundo and his second technical foul came from his encounter with the commissioner Narvasa that led him to be ejected from the game.

Johnson, through his Twitter account, later apologized to Commissioner Narvasa and thanked the PBA for giving him the chance to return as the import of the Tropang TNT for the second consecutive time. In a press conference, Narvasa accepted Johnson's apology, three days after the incident. The PBA later downgraded the ban order to a suspension good for one season and the fine has been reduced to 150,000 pesos.

=== Petrochimi Bandar Imam / Caciques de Humacao (2016) ===
On March 9, 2016, Johnson signed with Petrochimi Bandar Imam of the Iranian Super League. However, he never played for the Iranian team. On April 25, he left Petrochimi and signed with Caciques de Humacao for a second stint.

=== Hekmeh/Sagesse (2016) ===
On December 12, 2016, Johnson signed with Sagesse of the Lebanese Basketball League.

=== Alab Pilipinas (2017) ===
After a stint in the BIG3, Johnson returned to professional, 5-on-5 basketball after being signed by the Alab Pilipinas of the ASEAN Basketball League as its new World Import. This will be Johnson's third stint playing in the Philippines.

== NBA career statistics ==
Legend
GP	Games played	GS	Games started	MPG	Minutes per game
FG%	Field goal percentage	3P%	3-point field goal percentage	FT%	Free throw percentage
RPG	Rebounds per game	APG	Assists per game	SPG	Steals per game
BPG	Blocks per game	PPG	Points per game	**Bold**	Career high

=== Regular season ===
Year	Team	GP	GS	MPG	FG%	3P%	FT%	RPG	APG	SPG	BPG	PPG
2011–12	Atlanta	56	0	**16.7**	.513	**.333**	**.720**	**4.0**	.6	**.8**	**.3**	6.4
2012–13	Atlanta	**69**	**5**	15.0	**.520**	.077	.618	3.9	**.7**	**.8**	.2	**6.6**
Career		125	5	15.8	.517	.158	.662	3.9	.6	.8	.3	6.5

=== Playoffs ===
Year	Team	GP	GS	MPG	FG%	3P%	FT%	RPG	APG	SPG	BPG	PPG
2012	Atlanta	5	0	10.8	.313	.000	.600	**3.4**	.0	.6	.0	2.6
2013	Atlanta	**6**	0	**18.0**	**.462**	.000	**.667**	3.3	**.5**	**.7**	**.5**	**6.0**
Career		11	0	14.7	.405	.000	.652	3.4	.3	.6	.3	4.5
