= Mono Vampire =

Thai professional basketball team

- Nickname: The Vampires
- Leagues: ASEAN Basketball League (2015–2016, 2017–2020); Thailand Basketball League (until 2020)
- Founded: 2014
- Folded: 2020
- Arena: Stadium 29
- Team colours: Orange, black, silver
- Main sponsor: MONO29 TV
- Ownership: Mono 29
- Championships: 4x TBL champion (2015, 2016, 2017, 2018)
Home	Away

The Mono Vampire Basketball Club (Thai: โมโนแวมไพร์) is a Thai professional basketball team that previously played in the ASEAN Basketball League. They have also participated in the Thailand Basketball League. It is owned by Mono Group, a Thai media and technology conglomerate.

Established in 2014, the Vampires finished third at the Thailand Basketball League and the Thailand Basketball Super League in their first season.

In 2015, the Vampires won the Thailand Basketball League title. On the same year, the Vampires joined the ASEAN Basketball League but failed to perform.

The Vampires withdrew from the ABL mid-season after the 2019–20 season was suspended due to the COVID-19 pandemic.

== Achievements ==
Year	ABL regular season	ABL playoffs position	FIBA Asia Champions Cup
2015–16	5th place	Did not qualify	Did not qualify
2016–17	Did not participate	Did not participate	6th
2017–18	2nd place	Runners-Up	5th
2018–19	8th place	Semi-finalists	Did not participate
2019–20	Withdrew	Did not participate	

== Season by season ==
Season	ASEAN Basketball						FIBA Asia Championships Cup			
Season	Regular season	Played	Wins	Losses	Win %	Postseason	Final Ranking	Wins	Losses	Win %
2015–16	5th	20	3	17	.150	Did not qualify	Did not qualify	-	-	-
2016–17	Did not participate	-	-	-	-	-	6th	2	5	.286
2017–18	5th	20	14	6	.700	Runners-Up in Final against San Miguel Alab Pilipinas, 2–3 (series)	5th	3	2	.600
2018–19	8th	26	11	15	.423	Lost in semi-finals to BTN CLS Knights Indonesia, 1–2 (series)	Did not participate	-	-	-
2019–20	TBD									

== Roster (2020) ==
Note: Flags indicate national team eligibility at FIBA-sanctioned events. Players may hold other non-FIBA nationalities not displayed.

Mono Vampire roster
Players
Coaches

Pos.	No.	Nat.	Name	Ht.	Wt.
G	0	(United States) (Thailand)	Goldstein, Freddie	1.7 m (5 ft 7 in)	60 kg (132 lb)
G/F	1	(United States) (Thailand)	Lamb, Tyler	1.96 m (6 ft 5 in)	94 kg (207 lb)
F	7	(United States)	Singletary, Mike (WI)	2.03 m (6 ft 8 in)	100 kg (220 lb)
F	11	(United States) (Thailand)	Morgan, Moses	2.01 m (6 ft 7 in)	101 kg (223 lb)
F	14	(Thailand)	Boonserm, Narathip	1.98 m (6 ft 6 in)	88 kg (194 lb)
G	15	(United States)	Knowles, Preston (WI)	1.96 m (6 ft 5 in)	88 kg (194 lb)
C	22	(United States)	Morrison, Michael (WI)	2.18 m (7 ft 2 in)	108 kg (238 lb)
G	33	(Thailand)	Saengtong, Nopporn	1.88 m (6 ft 2 in)	105 kg (231 lb)
G	36	(Thailand)	Sunthornsiri, Sorot	1.90 m (6 ft 3 in)	74 kg (163 lb)
F	58	(Thailand)	Phuangla, Arnat	2.01 m (6 ft 7 in)	83 kg (183 lb)
F/C	65	(Thailand)	Chantachon, Teerawat	2.03 m (6 ft 8 in)	99 kg (218 lb)
G	69	(Thailand)	Apiromwilaichai, Darongphan	1.91 m (6 ft 3 in)	82 kg (181 lb)
G	77	(Thailand)	Ananti, Chitchai	1.91 m (6 ft 3 in)	65 kg (143 lb)
G	79	(Thailand)	Toweroj, Jittaphon	1.88 m (6 ft 2 in)

Head coach

- (Slovenia) Andrej Urlep

Assistant coach(es)

- (Thailand) Ratdech Kruatiwa
- (Thailand) Supakitti Thongthip
- (Thailand) Singhasene Tongkiat

Legend

- (C) Team captain
- (WI) World import
- Injured

- Roster
Updated: 19 January 2020

=== Depth chart ===
Pos.	Starting 5	Bench
C	(United States) Michael Morrison
PF	(United States) Mike Singletary
SF	(Thailand) (United States) Moses Morgan
SG	(Thailand) (United States) Tyler Lamb
PG	(United States) Preston Knowles	(Thailand) (United States) Freddie Goldstein

== Notable players ==
To appear in this section a player must have either:

- Set a club record or won an individual award as a professional player.
- Played at least one official international match for his senior national team at any time.

=== National team ===
- (Thailand) Chitchai Ananti
- (Thailand) Darunpong Apiromvilaichai
- (Thailand) Teerawat Chantachon
- (Thailand) Chanachon Klahan
- (Thailand) Patiphan Klahan
- (Thailand) Ratdech Kruatiwa
- (Thailand) Kannut Samerjai
- (Thailand) Peeranat Semmesuk
- (Thailand) Sorot Sunthonsiri
- (Thailand) Jittaphon Towaroj
- (Thailand) (United States) Tyler Lamb
- (Thailand) (United States) Moses Morgan

=== Club Team ===
- (Philippines) (United States) Jason Brickman
- (United States) Coreontae DeBerry
- (Malta) (Italy) Samuel Deguara
- (United States) Reggie Johnson
- (United States) Mike Singletary

== Head coach ==
- (Thailand) Soontornpong Mawintorn (2015–2016)
- (United States) Douglas Marty (2017–2019)
- (Slovenia) Andrej Urlep (2019–2021)
