= Alab Pilipinas =

Filipino basketball team

- Leagues: ASEAN Basketball League
- Founded: 2016
- Folded: 2020
- History: Alab Pilipinas (2016–2017); Tanduay Alab Pilipinas (2017–2018); San Miguel Alab Pilipinas (2018–2020)
- Arena: Various
- Team colors: Red, Blue, White
- Head coach: Jimmy Alapag
- Championships: 1 (2018)
Home	Away	Alternate

Alab Pilipinas (under the corporate name Pilipinas Basketball Club, Inc. or PBCI) was a Filipino professional basketball team which played in the ASEAN Basketball League (ABL). The team was owned and managed by the sports talent management firm, Virtual Playground, headed by talent agents Dondon Monteverde and Charlie Dy. Alab Pilipinas is the fourth Philippine team to play in the ABL. "Alab" is a Filipino word that translates as "blaze" in English.

From November 2017 to January 2018, it was known as Tanduay Alab Pilipinas, under the sponsorship of Tanduay Distillers; and from February 2018 onwards, it took on the name of San Miguel Alab Pilipinas after San Miguel Corporation took over as sponsor.

The team disbanded in 2020 after the ABL shut down due to the COVID-19 pandemic.

== History ==

Logos under the sponsorship of Tanduay Distillers (top) and San Miguel Corporation (bottom).

Six of its original players are ABL veterans who had previously played for the Champion team San Miguel in the 2013 ABL season. The team staged their home games in venues located in Biñan, Laguna, Cebu, and Davao during the entire duration of their first season. They organized several basketball clinics together with the local government units as part of the basketball grassroots development program.

The team was sponsored by liquor brand Tanduay and played as Tanduay-Alab Pilipinas from November 2017 to January 2018. On February 1, 2018, San Miguel Corporation took over as the team's sponsor and was renamed San Miguel Alab Pilipinas. The sudden separation with Tanduay came about reportedly due to differences between the two parties in the handling of the team.

== Head coaches ==
Name	Tenure	Totals				Regular season				Playoffs			
Name	Tenure	G	W	L	PCT	G	W	L	PCT	G	W	L	PCT
Mac Cuan	November 29, 2016 – March 26, 2017	22	11	11	.500	20	11	9	.550	2	0	2	.000
Jimmy Alapag	November 19, 2017 – 2020	55	39	16	.709	46	32	14	.696	10	7	3	.700
Totals		77	50	27	.649	66	43	23	.652	12	7	5	.583

== Notable players ==
Note: Players mentioned below are recipients of ABL awards or recognitions ONLY.

Name	Nationality	Award(s)
Renaldo Balkman	Puerto Rican	2018: ABL Defensive Player of the Year; 2018: ABL Champion
Bobby Ray Parks Jr.	Filipino American	2017, 2018, 2019: 3x ABL Local MVP; 2018: ABL Finals MVP; 2018: ABL Champion
Jason Brickman	Filipino American	2016: ABL Finals MVP; 2016: ABL Champion

== Team results ==
Season	Team name	Elimination round				Playoffs	
Season	Team name	Finish	W	L	PCT	Stage	Results
2016–17	Alab Pilipinas	3rd/6	11	9	.550	Semifinals	Lost semifinals to Singapore Slingers, 0–2
2017–18	San Miguel Alab Pilipinas	3rd/9	14	6	.700	Quarterfinals; Semifinals; Finals	Won quarterfinals vs. Saigon Heat, 2–0; Won semifinals vs. Hong Kong Eastern, 2–0; Won ABL finals vs. Mono Vampire, 3–2
2018–19	San Miguel Alab Pilipinas	2nd/10	18	8	.692	Quarterfinals	Lost quarterfinals to Hong Kong Eastern, 0–2
2019–20	San Miguel Alab Pilipinas	2nd/10	10	6	.625	Season cancelled due to the COVID-19 pandemic in Asia	
Total elimination round			53	29	.646	2 semifinals appearances	
Total playoffs			7	6	.538	1 finals appearance	
Total franchise			60	35	.632	1 championship	

== Home arena ==
Unlike other teams in the ABL, Alab Pilipinas doesn't have a primary venue. Instead, it tours around the Philippines, mostly in the Mega Manila, with select games elsewhere.

The team hosted all but one of their 2018 ABL playoffs games at the Santa Rosa Multi-Purpose Complex in Santa Rosa, Laguna.

Final courts (used from 2018–19 ABL season until 2020)

- Caloocan Sports Complex, Caloocan
- Filoil Flying V Centre, San Juan
- Hoops Dome, Lapu-Lapu
- Lapu Lapu Sports Complex, Lapu-Lapu
- Santa Rosa Multi-Purpose Complex, Santa Rosa, Laguna (primary venue)

Former

- Alonte Sports Arena, Biñan, Laguna
- Baliuag Star Arena, Baliuag, Bulacan
- Davao City Recreation Center, Davao City
- Mall of Asia Arena, Pasay
- Olivarez College Gym, Parañaque
- University of Southeastern Philippines Gym, Davao City
- Ynares Center, Antipolo, Rizal

== See also ==
- San Miguel Beermen (ABL), basketball team owned by the San Miguel Corporation that played in the ABL.
