= 2017 ABL playoffs =

Tournament details
- Dates: April 02 – April 23
- Season: 2016–17
- Teams: 4

Final positions
- Champions: Eastern (1st title)
- Runners-up: Singapore Slingers
- Semifinalists: Alab Pilipinas; Saigon Heat

The 2017 ABL playoffs is the postseason tournament concluding the 2016–17 ABL season of the ASEAN Basketball League (ABL). The top four teams that had the best regular-season records qualified. The semifinals are a best-of-three series, while the finals is a best-of-five series. The higher-seed team holds the home court advantage, hosting games 1 and 3 in the semifinals, and games 1, 2 and 5 in the finals.

The Eastern Sports Club and Alab Pilipinas qualified to the playoffs in their first year in the league. Last season's losing finalists, the Singapore Slingers, and the Saigon Heat, also qualified. Defending champions Westports Malaysia Dragons missed the playoffs for the first time in league history.

The best team from the Southeast Asia Basketball Association (SEABA) qualify for the 2017 FIBA Asia Champions Cup as SEABA's representative. As the Singapore Slingers are the only SEABA team in the Finals, they will be taking SEABA's berth; Hong Kong Eastern are from the East Asia Basketball Association.

== Bracket ==
Semifinals
1	Eastern	2
4	Saigon	0
2	Singapore	2
3	Alab	0

Finals
1	Eastern	3
2	Singapore	1

== Semifinals ==
=== Eastern vs. Saigon ===
5 April
20:00 UTC+8

Eastern	114–74	Saigon Heat
Scoring by quarter: 24–20, 24–12, 36–21, 30–21
Pts: Marcus Elliott 23; Rebs: Josh Boone 11; Asts: Marcus Elliott 13		Pts: Lenny Daniel 32; Rebs: Lenny Daniel 13; Asts: 4 players, 3

Southorn Stadium, Wan Chai

8 April
17:00 UTC+7

Saigon Heat	79–86	Eastern
Scoring by quarter: 21–25, 27–18, 11–25, 20–18
Pts: Lenny Daniel, David Arnold 22; Rebs: Jordan Henriquez 19; Asts: Lenny Daniel 5		Pts: Josh Boone 27; Rebs: Josh Boone 8 Asts: Marcus Elliott 7
Eastern win series, 2–0

CIS Arena, Ho Chi Minh City

=== Singapore vs. Alab ===
2 April
16:00 UTC+8

Singapore Slingers	77–67	Alab Pilipinas
Scoring by quarter: 19–16, 23–15, 19–18, 16–18
Pts: Xavier Alexander 24; Rebs: Justin Howard 12; Asts: Xavier Alexander 7		Pts: Kiefer Ravena 16; Rebs: James Hughes 11; Asts: Bobby Ray Parks Jr. 4

OCBC Arena, Kallang

7 April
20:00 UTC+8

Alab Pilipinas	64–82	Singapore Slingers
Scoring by quarter: 14–24, 15–23, 22–13, 13–22
Pts: Lawrence Domingo 18; Rebs: James Hughes 14; Asts: Paulo Hubalde 4		Pts: Xavier Alexander 21; Rebs: Justin Howard 16; Asts: Josh Urbiztondo 6
Singapore Slingers win series, 2–0

Baliwag Star Arena, Baliuag

== Finals ==
All times are local (UTC+08:00)

StarHub, Cable TV, S+A

15 April 2017
20:00

Eastern	76–92	Singapore Slingers
Scoring by quarter: 21–24, 20–22, 17–22, 18–24
Pts: Marcus Elliott 20; Rebs: Josh Boone 13; Asts: Marcus Elliott 7		Pts: Justin Howard 45; Rebs: Justin Howard 28; Asts: Xavier Alexander 8
Slingers leads series, 1–0

Southorn Stadium, Wan Chai

StarHub, Cable TV, S+A

18 April 2017
20:00

Eastern	92–84	Singapore Slingers
Scoring by quarter: 25–24, 25–16, 20–25, 22–19
Pts: Marcus Elliott 26; Rebs: Josh Boone 16; Asts: Chan Siu Wing 6		Pts: Xavier Alexander 27; Rebs: Justin Howard 12; Asts: Xavier Alexander 6
Series tied, 1–1

Southorn Stadium, Wan Chai

StarHub, Cable TV, S+A

21 April 2017
20:00

Eastern	76–72	Singapore Slingers
Scoring by quarter: 12–17, 27–23, 18–16, 19–16
Pts: Marcus Elliott 21; Rebs: Marcus Elliott 9 Asts: Marcus Elliott 9		Pts: Justin Howard 31; Rebs: Justin Howard 23; Asts: Xavier Alexander 13
Eastern leads series, 2–1

OCBC Arena Hall 1, Kallang

StarHub, Cable TV, S+A

23 April 2017
16:00

Eastern	82–80 (2OT)	Singapore Slingers
Scoring by quarter: 20–21, 19–16, 16–22, 13–9, Overtime: 6–6, 8–6
Pts: Marcus Elliott 26; Rebs: Josh Boone 18; Asts: Marcus Elliott 8		Pts: Howard, Alexander 20 each Rebs: Justin Howard 26; Asts: Xavier Alexander 8
Eastern wins series, 3–1

OCBC Arena Hall 1, Kallang
