= 2019–20 ABL season =

- League: ASEAN Basketball League
- Sport: Basketball
- Duration: 16 November 2019 – 13 March 2020 (regular season; originally until 28 March 2020)
- Teams: 10
- TV partner(s): (Hong Kong) Cable TV (Brunei) (Malaysia) Astro Arena (Philippines) S+A (Singapore) Singtel (Thailand) Mono 29 (Taiwan) Eleven Sports Network (Vietnam) FPT; YouTube (non-participating nations)

Regular season
- Top seed: None (cancelled)

ABL Finals
- Champions: Not awarded (cancelled)

Seasons
- ← 2018–19 2023 →

The 2019–20 ABL season was the tenth season of competition in the ASEAN Basketball League. The regular season started on 16 November 2019 and was set to end on 28 March 2020.

On 15 July 2020, the league announced the cancellation of the season due to the COVID-19 pandemic outbreak. No league title was awarded.

== Teams ==
Listed are the following team changes that happened before the start of the season:

1. Taipei Fubon Braves becomes the 2nd team in the ABL from Taiwan.
2. CLS Knights Indonesia as the defending champion officially announced that they will not be competing in this season.
3. The Wolf Warriors relocated from Zhuhai to Macau; they still retained the Wolf Warriors name.
4. Westports Malaysia Dragons was renamed into the Kuala Lumpur Dragons.

=== Venues ===
Locations of ABL teams.
Locations of ABL teams in the Pearl River Delta.
Locations of ABL arenas in Metro Manila.

Team	City / Region	Arena	Capacity
(Chinese Taipei) Formosa Dreamers	Changhua, Changhua County	Changhua Stadium	8,000
Hong Kong Eastern	Wan Chai, Hong Kong	Southorn Stadium	2,000
(Malaysia) Kuala Lumpur Dragons	Kuala Lumpur	MABA Stadium	2,500
Macau Black Bears	Macau	Venetian Macau Hall D	
(Thailand) Mono Vampire	Bangkok Metropolitan Region	Stadium 29, Nonthaburi	5,000
(Vietnam) Saigon Heat	Ho Chi Minh City	Canadian International School Vietnam Arena	2,500
(Philippines) Alab Pilipinas	Santa Rosa, Laguna	City of Santa Rosa Multi-Purpose Complex	5,700
(Philippines) Alab Pilipinas	Metro Manila	Cuneta Astrodome, Pasay	12,000
(Philippines) Alab Pilipinas	Metro Manila	Filoil Flying V Centre, San Juan	5,500
(Philippines) Alab Pilipinas	Metro Manila	Caloocan Sports Complex, Caloocan	3,000
(Philippines) Alab Pilipinas	Lapu-Lapu City	Hoops Dome	6,000
(Philippines) Alab Pilipinas	Antipolo, Rizal	Ynares Center	7,400
(Philippines) Alab Pilipinas	Davao City	University of Southeastern Philippines Gymnasium	7,000
Singapore Slingers	Singapore, Kallang	OCBC Arena	3,000
(Chinese Taipei) Taipei Fubon Braves	Taipei City	Taipei Heping Basketball Gymnasium	7,000
(Macau) Wolf Warriors	Macau	Foshan Shishan Gymnasium	
(Macau) Wolf Warriors	Macau	Zhongshan Shaxi Gymnasium	

=== Personnel ===
Team	Head coach
(Chinese Taipei) Formosa Dreamers	(Canada) Kyle Julius
Hong Kong Eastern	(United States) Jordan Brady
(Malaysia) Kuala Lumpur Dragons	(Australia) Jamie Pearlman
Macau Black Bears	(Canada) Charles Hantoumakos
(Thailand) Mono Vampire	(Slovenia) Andrej Urlep
(Vietnam) Saigon Heat	(United States) Kevin Yurkus
(Philippines) Alab Pilipinas	(Philippines) Jimmy Alapag
Singapore Slingers	(Singapore) Neo Beng Siang
(Chinese Taipei) Taipei Fubon Braves	(Chinese Taipei) Xu Jin-zhe
(Macau) Wolf Warriors	(United States) Todd Purves

=== Imports ===
Club	Import 1	Import 2	Import 3	Former Imports
(Chinese Taipei) Formosa Dreamers	(United States) Jerran Young	(United States) Anthony Tucker	(United States) Ryan Watkins	(United States) Marcus Keene (Canada) Liam McMorrow (United States) Jordan Tolbert
Hong Kong Eastern	(United States) Brandis Raley-Ross	(United States) Michael Holyfield	(United States) Brandon Costner	(United States) Timothy Jerrell Price (United States) Trey Kell
(Malaysia) Kuala Lumpur Dragons	(United States) Amir Bell	(United States) William Artino	(United States) Cade Davis	
Macau Black Bears	(United States) Kenneth Manigault	(United States) Jasonn Hannibal	(Philippines) Mikh McKinney	(United States) Brandon Edwards
(Thailand) Mono Vampire	(United States) Mike Singletary	(United States) Preston Knowles	(United States) Michael Morrison	(United States) Anthony Tucker (United States) Ryan Watkins
(Vietnam) Saigon Heat	(United States) Sam Thompson	(United States) Malcolm White	(United States) Tyshawn Taylor	(Panama) Gary Forbes (United States) Chris Charles (United States) Torian Graham (United States) Mike Bell (England) Morakinyo Michael Williams (United States) (Jamaica) Akeem Scott
(Philippines) Alab Pilipinas	(United States) Justin Brownlee	(United States) Nick King	(United States) John Fields	(Puerto Rico) Renaldo Balkman (Jamaica) Adrian Forbes (United States) Khalif Wyatt (United States) Prince Williams (Italy) Sam Deguara
Singapore Slingers	(United States) Xavier Alexander	(United States) Marcus Elliott	(United States) Jameel McKay	(United States) Anthony McClain
(Chinese Taipei) Taipei Fubon Braves	(United States) O. J. Mayo	(Belize) Charles Garcia	(United States) Maxie Esho	(Canada) Sim Bhullar
(Macau) Wolf Warriors	(United States) Julian Boyd	(United States) Steven Thomas	(United States) Doug Herring Jr.	(United States) Mike Bell

=== Local Heritage ===
(Macau) Wolf Warriors	(Vietnam) Saigon Heat	(Philippines) Alab Pilipinas	Macau Black Bears	(Thailand) Mono Vampire
(United States) (Hong Kong) Scott Ewing (China) Cai Chen (China) Cris Shentu (China) He Feng Sun (China) Zhi-Keng Tang (China) Zhong Xianchao (China) Hu Yue (China) He Zhang	(United States) Chris Dierker (United States) Tam Dinh (Netherlands) Vincent Nguyen (Canada) Michael Soy (United States) Khoa Tran (Denmark) Tim Waale (United States) Justin Young	(United States) Jason Brickman (United States) Lawrence Domingo (United States) Jeremiah Gray (Australia) Jordan Heading (United States) Brandon Rosser	(Canada) (Hong Kong) Jenning Leung (Canada) (China) Yunlei Warren Liang (China) He Jun Jian (China) Liu Zihao	(United States) Freddie Goldstein (United States) Tyler Lamb (United States) Moses Morgan
(Hong Kong) Eastern	(Chinese Taipei) Formosa Dreamers	(Chinese Taipei) Taipei Fubon Braves	(Malaysia) Kuala Lumpur Dragons	Singapore Slingers
(Philippines) (Nigeria) Joseph Eriobu (France) (Chinese Taipei) Steven Guinchard (Pakistan) Sheikh Muhammad Sulaiman	(United States) Kenneth Chien	(United States) Joseph Lin	(Bulgaria) Simeon Lepichev	

== Regular season ==
Each team will play 26 games throughout the season, 13 at home and 13 away. Each team will play the remaining 4 teams in their group, twice each at home and away. Each team will also play the 5 teams from the other group, once each at home and away. The groupings are as follows:

- Bears, Warriors, Eastern, Dreamers, Braves
- Alab, Slingers, Dragons, Vampire, Heat

After the league season was suspended due to COVID-19 pandemic, group leaders, Mono Vampire decided to withdraw from the league.

=== Standings ===
Pos	Team	W	L	PCT	GB
1	(Thailand) Mono Vampire	12	4	.750	—
2	(Philippines) Alab Pilipinas	10	6	.625	2
3	(Malaysia) Kuala Lumpur Dragons	10	7	.588	2.5
4	(Chinese Taipei) Formosa Dreamers	8	6	.571	3
5	(Chinese Taipei) Taipei Fubon Braves	9	8	.529	3.5
6	Macau Black Bears	7	7	.500	4
7	Singapore Slingers	7	10	.412	5.5
8	(Macau) Wolf Warriors	5	8	.385	5.5
9	(Hong Kong) Eastern	3	7	.300	6
10	(Vietnam) Saigon Heat	3	11	.214	8

Source: ABL

=== Results ===
Home \ Away	FMD	HKE	WMD	MBB	MNV	SGH	SAP	SGS	FBB	MWW	FMD	HKE	WMD	MBB	MNV	SGH	SAP	SGS	FBB	MWW
Dreamers	—		85–79	85–91		89–80	99–100	88–77	81–90		—			100–94					88–80	
Eastern		—	82–78	79–93		84–75	76–77	67–73				—								
Dragons	80–79		—			72–79	91–63	87–88*					—					70–67		
Black Bears		97–80	97–87	—	101–96	95–83			85–100	91–94				—						95–97
Vampire	95–90	98–75	79–73		—	95–87	111–76	87–77	90–86*				94–91*		—		92–100*			
Heat	65–95		68–80		64–90	—									64–85	—				
Alab					96–73	82–75	—	90–83	101–96	93–98					89–102	99–79	—	86–77*		
Slingers			68–79	96–95	65–67	73–79	85–64	—	106–99*	76–72			68–77			101–67	92–80	—		
Brave	83–76	102–89	90–91	95–91	98–97			83–77	—			78–105		106–93					—	
Wolf Warriors	89–92	108–102	83–90	100–117		95–103	110–114*		88–83	—	89–100								89–104	—

Source: ASEANBasketballLeague.com
Legend: Blue = home team win; Red = away team win.
Matches with lighter background shading were decided after overtime.

== Awards ==
=== Players of the Week ===
Week	Player	Club	Ref
Week 1	(United States) Will Artino	(Malaysia) Kuala Lumpur Dragons	
Week 2	(United States) Kenny Manigault	Macau Black Bears	
Week 3	(United States) O. J. Mayo	(Chinese Taipei) Taipei Fubon Braves	
Week 4	(United States) Jerran Young	(Chinese Taipei) Formosa Dreamers	
Week 5	(United States) Doug Herring Jr.	Macau Wolf Warriors	
Week 6			
Week 7	(United States) O. J. Mayo	(Chinese Taipei) Taipei Fubon Braves	
Week 8	(United States) Jerran Young	(Chinese Taipei) Formosa Dreamers	
Week 9	(United States) Mike Singletary	(Thailand) Mono Vampire	
Week 10	(United States) Kenny Manigault	Macau Black Bears	
Week 11	(Philippines) Jason Brickman	(Philippines) Alab Pilipinas	
Week 12	(United States) Xavier Alexander	Singapore Slingers	
Week 13	(United States) Will Artino	(Malaysia) Kuala Lumpur Dragons	
Week 14	(United States) Cade Davis	(Malaysia) Kuala Lumpur Dragons	

=== Players of the Month ===
Month	Player	Club	Ref
November	(United States) Mike Singletary	(Thailand) Mono Vampire	
December			
January	(United States) O. J. Mayo	(Chinese Taipei) Taipei Fubon Braves	
