= 2017–18 Eastern Sports Club (basketball) season =

2017–18 Eastern season
- Head coach: (Spain) Edu Torres
- Owner(s): Eastern Sports Club

ABL 2017-2018 season results
- Record: 14–6 (.700)
- Place: 2nd
- Playoff finish: Semifinalist

Eastern seasons

The 2017–18 Eastern Sports Club (basketball) season was the second season of the franchise in the ASEAN Basketball League (ABL).

== Roster ==
Hong Kong Eastern Long Lions roster
Players
Coaches

Pos.	No.	Nat.	Name	Ht.	Wt.	DOB (YYYY-MM-DD)	From
F	0	(Hong Kong)	Ip, Chun Kit	1.87 m (6 ft 2 in)	85 kg (187 lb)	34 – 24 March 1992
G	2	(United States)	Elliott, Marcus Ryan (WI)	1.91 m (6 ft 3 in)	85 kg (187 lb)	42 – 24 April 1984
G/F	3	(Hong Kong)	Lee, Ki (C)	1.77 m (5 ft 10 in)	78 kg (172 lb)	38 – 16 October 1987
G	4	(The Bahamas)	O'Neal Moss, Ryan (WI)	2.03 m (6 ft 8 in)	105 kg (231 lb)	52 – 4 April 1974
G	10	(United States) (Thailand)	Lamb, Tyler (AI)	1.96 m (6 ft 5 in)	94 kg (207 lb)	35 – 16 May 1991
F	11	(Hong Kong)	So, Sheung Ying	1.88 m (6 ft 2 in)	80 kg (176 lb)	34 – 29 June 1992
F/C	14	(Hong Kong)	Tang, Chi Hang	1.90 m (6 ft 3 in)	100 kg (220 lb)	34 – 21 January 1992
F	15	(Hong Kong)	So, Chi Lok Jolin	1.85 m (6 ft 1 in)	85 kg (187 lb)	36 – 12 November 1989
F/C	29	(Hong Kong)	Chung, Chun Sing	1.92 m (6 ft 4 in)	75 kg (165 lb)	35 – 10 January 1991
C	30	(Hong Kong)	Wu, Cheuk Pan	2.06 m (6 ft 9 in)	95 kg (209 lb)	32 – 23 November 1993
F	34	(Germany) (Philippines)	Standhardinger, Christian (AI)	2.03 m (6 ft 8 in)	100 kg (220 lb)	37 – 4 July 1989	Hawaiʻi
F/C	35	(Hong Kong)	Ngan, Wing Fai	1.93 m (6 ft 4 in)	85 kg (187 lb)	33 – 12 March 1993
G	88	(Hong Kong)	Lau, Tsz Lai	1.84 m (6 ft 0 in)	82 kg (181 lb)	35 – 4 November 1990

Head coach

- (Spain) Edu Torres

Assistant coach(es)

- (Hong Kong) Chan King Chee John
- (Hong Kong) Lam Chun Wai
- (Hong Kong) Chan Kin Man
- (Spain) Fernando Gordo

Athletic trainer(s)

- (The Bahamas) Ryan O'Neal Moss

Legend

- (C) Team captain
- (WI) World import
- (AI) ASEAN heritage import
- Injured

== Standing ==
=== Elimination ===
Pos	Team	Pld	W	L	PF	PA	PD	PCT	GB	Qualification
1	(China) Chong Son Kung Fu	20	15	5	1864	1638	+226	.750	—	Semi-finals
2	Hong Kong Eastern	20	14	6	1949	1856	+93	.700 (Note: Head-to-head record: Hong Kong Eastern 3–1; San Miguel Alab Pilipinas 2–2; Mono Vampire 1–3)	1	Semi-finals
3	(Philippines) San Miguel Alab Pilipinas	20	14	6	1844	1681	+163	.700	1	Quarter-finals
4	(Thailand) Mono Vampire	20	14	6	2024	1957	+67	.700	1	Quarter-finals
5	Singapore Slingers	20	12	8	1651	1598	+53	.600	3	Quarter-finals
6	(Vietnam) Saigon Heat	20	10	10	1963	1956	+7	.500	5	Quarter-finals
7	CLS Knights Indonesia	20	5	15	1614	1733	−119	.250 (Note: Head-to-head record: CLS Knights Indonesia 2–0; Westports Malaysia Dragons 0–2)	10	
8	Westports Malaysia Dragons	20	5	15	1802	1974	−172	.250	10	
9	(Chinese Taipei) Formosa Dreamers	20	1	19	1593	1901	−308	.050	14	

Source: ASEANBasketballLeague.com

== Game log ==
2017–18 game log
Total: 14–6
November : 1–0 (Home: 0–0; Road: 1–0)

Game	Date	Team	Score	High points	High rebounds	High assists	Location Attendance	Record
1	November 19	Tanduay Alab Pilipinas	W 92-89 Archived 2018-01-04 at the Wayback Machine	Christian Standhardinger (26)	Christian Standhardinger (14)	Marcus Ryan Elliott (9)	Mall of Asia Arena	1–0

December : 6–0 (Home: 2–0; Road: 4–0)

Game	Date	Team	Score	High points	High rebounds	High assists	Location Attendance	Record
2	December 3	CLS Knights Indonesia	W 87-78 Archived 2018-03-16 at the Wayback Machine	Tyler Lamb (25)	Ryan O'Neil Moss (16)	Marcus Ryan Elliott (6)	GOR CLS Kertajaya	2–0
3	December 8	Mono Vampire	W 112-105 Archived 2018-03-16 at the Wayback Machine	Christian Standhardinger (40)	Christian Standhardinger (17)	Marcus Ryan Elliott (9)	Stadium 29	3–0
4	December 10	Singapore Slingers	W 81-77 Archived 2018-03-17 at the Wayback Machine	Tyler Lamb (30)	Standhardinger, Moss (10)	Marcus Ryan Elliott (9)	OCBC Arena Singapore	4–0
5	December 13	Tanduay Alab Pilipinas	W 99-96 Archived 2018-03-17 at the Wayback Machine	Tyler Lamb (32)	Christian Standhardinger (12)	Marcus Ryan Elliott (7)	Southorn Stadium	5–0
6	December 17	Formosa Dreamers	W 120-97 Archived 2018-03-16 at the Wayback Machine	Tyler Lamb (22)	Ryan O'Neal Moss (10)	Marcus Ryan Elliott (13)	Changhua Stadium	6–0
7	December 20	Singapore Slingers	W 82-79 Archived 2018-03-16 at the Wayback Machine	Tyler Lamb (25)	Christian Standhardinger (13)	Marcus Ryan Elliott (8)	Southorn Stadium	7–0

January : 2–1 (Home: 2–1; Road: 0–0)

Game	Date	Team	Score	High points	High rebounds	High assists	Location Attendance	Record
8	January 9	Saigon Heat	L 115-121 Archived 2018-03-16 at the Wayback Machine	Christian Standhardinger (37)	Christian Standhardinger (19)	Marcus Ryan Elliott (10)	Southorn Stadium	7–1
9	January 18	Formosa Dreamers	W 99-79 Archived 2018-03-25 at the Wayback Machine	Standhardinger, Lamb (25)	Marcus Ryan Elliott (11)	Marcus Ryan Elliott (11)	Southorn Stadium	8–1
10	January 24	CLS Knights Indonesia	W 104-81 Archived 2018-03-23 at the Wayback Machine	Elliott, Lamb (23)	Tyler Lamb (12)	Elliott, Lamb (10)	Southorn Stadium	9–1

February : 3–1 (Home: 2–0; Road: 1–1)

Game	Date	Team	Score	High points	High rebounds	High assists	Location Attendance	Record
11	February 4	Saigon Heat	L 115-118 Archived 2018-03-07 at the Wayback Machine	Christian Standhardinger (31)	Christian Standhardinger (18)	Marcus Ryan Elliott (4)	CIS Arena Saigon	9–2
12	February 8	Westports Malaysia Dragons	W 104-92 Archived 2018-03-14 at the Wayback Machine	Tyler Lamb (28)	Standhardinger, Elliott (11)	Marcus Ryan Elliott (15)	Southorn Stadium	10–2
13	February 13	Chong Son Kung Fu	W 88-76 Archived 2018-03-16 at the Wayback Machine	Christian Standhardinger (23)	Ryan O'Neal Moss (15)	Marcus Ryan Elliott (8)	Southorn Stadium	11–2
14	February 24	Formosa Dreamers	W 93-91 Archived 2018-03-16 at the Wayback Machine	Marcus Ryan Elliott (31)	Christian Standhardinger (10)	Marcus Ryan Elliott (7)	Changhua Stadium	12–2

March : 2–4 (Home: 1–2; Road: 1–2)

Game	Date	Team	Score	High points	High rebounds	High assists	Location Attendance	Record
15	March 9	Chong Son Kung Fu	L 85-94 Archived 2018-03-16 at the Wayback Machine	Marcus Ryan Elliott (24)	Christian Standhardinger (10)	Tyler Lamb (5)	Nanhai Gymnasium	12–3
16	March 13	Chong Son Kung Fu	L 76-87 Archived 2018-03-16 at the Wayback Machine	Christian Standhardinger (24)	Christian Standhardinger (12)	Marcus Ryan Elliott (6)	Nanhai Gymnasium	12–4
17	March 15	Mono Vampire	L 111–119 Archived 2018-07-05 at the Wayback Machine	Tyler Lamb (32)	Samuel Maltese Deguara (15)	Jason Brickman (13)	Southorn Stadium	12–5
18	March 22	Formosa Dreamers	W 99–93 Archived 2018-07-05 at the Wayback Machine	Christian Standhardinger (33)	Christian Standhardinger (15)	Marcus Elliott (10)	Southorn Stadium	13–5
19	March 25	Westports Malaysia Dragons	W 110–96 Archived 2018-07-05 at the Wayback Machine	Lamb, Elliott (25)	Christian Standhardinger (10)	Marcus Elliott (10)	MABA Stadium	14–5
20	March 28	Chong Son Kung Fu	L 77–88 Archived 2018-07-05 at the Wayback Machine	Tyler Lamb (30)	Christian Standhardinger (14)	Marcus Elliott (5)	Southorn Stadium	14–6

== Playoffs ==
Quarterfinals
4 (Thailand) Mono Vampire	2
5 Singapore Slingers	0
3 (Philippines) San Miguel Alab Pilipinas	2
6 (Vietnam) Saigon Heat	0

Semifinals
1 (China) Chong Son Kung Fu	0
4 (Thailand) Mono Vampire	2
2 Hong Kong Eastern	0
3 (Philippines) San Miguel Alab Pilipinas	2

Finals
4 (Thailand) Mono Vampire	2
3 (Philippines) San Miguel Alab Pilipinas	3

=== Game log ===
2018 playoff game log
Total: 0–2
Semifinals : 0–2 (Home: 0–1; Road: 0–1)

Game	Date	Team	Score	High points	High rebounds	High assists	Location Attendance	Record
1	April 11	Tanduay Alab Pilipinas	L 94–98 Archived 2018-07-08 at the Wayback Machine	Tyler Lamb (32)	Christian Standhardinger (15)	Marcus Elliott (10)	Southorn Stadium	0–1
2	April 15	Tanduay Alab Pilipinas	L 72–79 Archived 2018-07-08 at the Wayback Machine	Tyler Lamb (25)	Ryan O'Neil Moss (16)	Elliott, Lee (3)	Sta. Rosa Arena	0–2

== Transactions ==
=== Recruited imports ===
Season	Name	Debuted	Last game	Record	Source
2017-18	(United States) Marcus Ryan Elliot (World Import)	November 19, 2017	April 15, 2018	14–8	
2017-18	(The Bahamas) Ryan O'Neil Moss (World Import)	November 19, 2017	April 15, 2018	14–8	
2017-18	(United States) (Thailand) Tyler Lamb (ASEAN Heritage Import)	November 19, 2017	April 15, 2018	14–8	
2017-18	(Philippines) (Germany) Christian Standhardinger (ASEAN Heritage Import)	November 19, 2017	April 15, 2018	14–8	
