= 2023 ABL Invitational =

- League: ASEAN Basketball League
- Sport: Basketball
- Duration: 2 January – 15 March 2023
- Teams: 8

Invitational
- Top seed: Saigon Heat

ABL Finals
- Champions: Hong Kong Eastern
- Runners-up: (Vietnam) Saigon Heat
- Finals MVP: (Colombia) Tonny Trocha-Morelos

Seasons
- ← 2019–20

The 2023 ABL Invitational was an invitational tournament held by the ASEAN Basketball League. The elimination round tipped off on 2 January in Singapore, before moving to 3 other host countries. The tournament ended with the finals played from 3 to 15 March. The 2023 Invitational featured eight teams from the region.

Intended to signify the return of the ABL, it ended up being the last tournament the league held before FIBA dropped support for the league, leaving its future uncertain.

== Teams ==
=== Changes from 2019–20 season ===
New teams:

- Bangkok Tigers
- Louvre Surabaya
- NS Matrix Deers
- Zamboanga Valientes

Did not participate:

- Alab Pilipinas
- Formosa Dreamers
- Kuala Lumpur Dragons
- Macau Wolf Warriors
- Mono Vampire
- Taipei Fubon Braves

=== Personnel ===
Team	Head coach
(Thailand) Bangkok Tigers	(Thailand) Jakkraphan Chupthaisong
Hong Kong Eastern	(Croatia) Željko Pavličević
(Indonesia) Louvre Surabaya	(Philippines) Jomar Tierra
Macau Black Bears	(Canada) Charles Dubé-Brais
(Malaysia) NS Matrix Deers	(Philippines) Jeff Viernes
(Vietnam) Saigon Heat	(United States) Matthew Van Pelt
Singapore Slingers	(Singapore) Neo Beng Siang
(Philippines) Zamboanga Valientes	(Philippines) Expedito De Los Santos

=== Imports ===
All teams can register a maximum of 3 foreigners and 1 heritage player. The salary cap for the foreign players is set at US$ 20,000 per month.

Team	Import 1	Import 2	Import 3	Heritage player	Former imports
(Thailand) Bangkok Tigers	(United States) William Vedder Freeman	(United States) Augustus Stone	(United States) Jose Nouchanthavong		(United States) Arizona Reid (United States) Jermale Jones (United States) Lloyd Burgess (United States) Alexander Osmand Smith
Hong Kong Eastern	(United States) O'Darien Bassett	(Canada) Chris McLaughlin	(Colombia) Tonny Trocha-Morelos	(Croatia) (Hong Kong) Dominic Gilbert	
(Indonesia) Louvre Surabaya	(United States) Marcus Hammonds	(France) Alioune Tew	(United States) (Indonesia) Jamarr Johnson	(Indonesia) (Philippines) Ebrahim Enguio Lopez	(United States) Sameen Swint
Macau Black Bears	(United States) Isaiah Wade	(United States) D'Angelo Hamilton	(United States) Dequan Abrom		(United States) Winston Shepard
(Malaysia) NS Matrix Deers	(United States) Amir Williams	(United States) Tevin Glass	(United States) Isaiah Williams	(Malaysia) (Singapore) Wong Zhong Han	(Nigeria) Henry Iloka
(Vietnam) Saigon Heat	(United States) Jeremy Combs	(United States) Evan Gilyard	(United States) Jairus Holder	(Vietnam) (United States) Hassan Thomas	
Singapore Slingers	(United States) Xavier Alexander	(United States) CJ Gettys	(United States) Kentrell Barkley		
(Philippines) Zamboanga Valientes	(Sierra Leone) Mohamed Sesay	(United States) Mario Chalmers	(Puerto Rico) Renaldo Balkman	(Philippines) (United States) Jeremy Arthur	(Australia) Will Deng (United States) Ryan Smith (United States) Antonio Hester

== Elimination round ==
The invitational tournament had a new format compared to previous seasons. There will be four rolling tournaments before the lead up to best-of-three semi-finals and finals. At the end of the four tournaments, each team would have played one another twice, and a total of 14 matches. The top four teams would advance to the semi-finals. The second leg will be in Batam, Indonesia, third leg in Kuala Lumpur, Malaysia and the fourth leg in Ho Chi Minh City, Vietnam. The semi final and final will be held also in Ho Chi Minh City, Vietnam.

=== Tournaments ===
Leg	Venue			Date
Leg	Location	Arena	Capacity	Date
1	Kallang, Singapore	OCBC Arena	3,000	2–8 January
2	Batam, Indonesia	Hi-Test Arena	1,200	12–18 January
3	Kuala Lumpur, Malaysia	MABA Stadium	2,500	3–8 February
4	Ho Chi Minh City, Vietnam	Nguyễn Du Indoor Stadium	2,100	12–17 February
Playoffs and final	Ho Chi Minh City, Vietnam	Nguyễn Du Indoor Stadium	2,100	6–14 March

=== Standings ===
Pos	Team	Pld	W	L	PF	PA	PD	Pts	Qualification
1	(Vietnam) Saigon Heat	14	11	3	1225	1024	+201	25	Advances to playoffs
2	Hong Kong Eastern	14	10	4	1131	953	+178	24 (Note: Head-to-head: Eastern 1–1 (+6) NS Matrix)	Advances to playoffs
3	(Malaysia) NS Matrix Deers	14	10	4	1215	1061	+154	24	Advances to playoffs
4	Singapore Slingers	14	9	5	1320	1129	+191	23	Advances to playoffs
5	Macau Black Bears	14	7	7	1139	1078	+61	21 (Note: Head-to-head: Macau 1–1 (+2) Zamboanga)	
6	(Philippines) Zamboanga Valientes	14	7	7	1183	1172	+11	21	
7	(Indonesia) Louvre Surabaya	14	1	13	990	1449	−459	15 (Note: Head-to-head: Louvre 1–1 (+23) Bangkok)	
8	(Thailand) Bangkok Tigers	14	1	13	1077	1414	−337	15	

Source: ABL

=== Results ===
Team	(Thailand) BKT	(Hong Kong) HKE	(Indonesia) LOU	(Macau) MBB	(Malaysia) NSM	(Vietnam) SGH	(Singapore) SGS	(Philippines) ZAV
(Thailand) Bangkok Tigers	—	66–75	88–84	64–94	86–96	73–89	74–121	80–84
Hong Kong Eastern	94–63	—	109–64	67–71	70–75	71–84	85–83	65–71
(Indonesia) Louvre Surabaya	124–97	50–101	—	59–93	67–104	35–97	83–138	69–83
Macau Black Bears	109–85	75–81	87–74	—	75–65	70–79	81–88	90–78
(Malaysia) NS Matrix Deers	117–78	62–73	89–51	73–54	—	84–88	88–79	98–88
(Vietnam) Saigon Heat	98–81	82–89	108–47	84–76	86–96	—	71–68	75–71
Singapore Slingers	111–69	52–68	147–89	89–82	84–82	84–83	—	79–87
(Philippines) Zamboanga Valientes	118–73	55–83	108–94	92–82	82–86	79–101	87–97	—

Updated to match(es) played on 14 February 2023. Source: ABL
Legend: Blue = left column team win; Red = top row team win.
Matches with lighter background shading were decided after overtime.

== Bracket ==
Semifinals (Best-of-three playoff)
1	(Vietnam) Saigon Heat	2
4	Singapore Slingers	1
2	Hong Kong Eastern	2
3	(Malaysia) NS Matrix Deers	0

Finals (Best-of-three playoff)
1	(Vietnam) Saigon Heat	1
2	Hong Kong Eastern	2

== Semi-finals ==
The semi-final is a best-of-three series with game 3 being played if necessary.

=== (1) Saigon Heat vs. (4) Singapore Slingers ===
6 March 2023
8:00 p.m.

Boxscore

Saigon Heat (Vietnam)	82–94	Singapore Slingers
Scoring by quarter: 20–18, 24–29, 20–19, 18–28
Pts: Gilyard 24; Rebs: Thomas 9 Asts: Combs 7		Pts: Gettys 24; Rebs: Gettys 12; Asts: Alexander 5

Nguyễn Du Indoor Stadium
Referees: Yong Sern Tee (MAS), Joenard Garcia (PHI), Mok Ho Yuen (HKG)

8 March 2023
8:00 p.m.

Boxscore

Singapore Slingers	79–81 (OT)	(Vietnam) Saigon Heat
Scoring by quarter: 19–20, 25–19, 12–15, 16–18, Overtime: 7–9
Pts: Gettys 31; Rebs: Gettys 20; Asts: Alexander 6		Pts: Gilyard, Holder 20 each Rebs: Combs 13; Asts: Combs, Gilyard 5 each

Nguyễn Du Indoor Stadium
Referees: Chan Owe Shiong (MAS), Joenard Garcia (PHI), Mok Ho Yuen (HKG)

9 March 2023
7:30 p.m.

Boxscore

Saigon Heat (Vietnam)	86–85	Singapore Slingers
Scoring by quarter: 18–21, 24–15, 22–26, 22–23
Pts: Combs 25; Rebs: Thomas 12; Asts: Gilyard 9		Pts: Gettys 25; Rebs: Barkley 13; Asts: Alexander, Goh 5
Heat wins series 2–1

Nguyễn Du Indoor Stadium
Referees: Chan Owe Shiong (MAS), Jontapa Nattapong (THA), Harry Santos (PHI)

=== (2) Hong Kong Eastern vs. (3) NS Matrix Deers ===
6 March 2023
6:00 p.m.

Boxscore

Hong Kong Eastern	76–51	(Malaysia) NS Matrix Deers
Scoring by quarter: 14–13, 21–9, 17–16, 24–13
Pts: Bassett 17; Rebs: Mclaughlin 16; Asts: Bassett 7		Pts: Glass 14; Rebs: Amir 16; Asts: Williams 3

Nguyễn Du Indoor Stadium
Referees: Rendra Lesmana (INA), Harry Santos (PHI), Neo Kai Chong (SIN)

8 March 2023
6:00 p.m.

Boxscore

NS Matrix Deers (Malaysia)	70–76	Hong Kong Eastern
Scoring by quarter: 18–12, 14–19, 19–22, 19–23
Pts: Amir 26; Rebs: Glass 15; Asts: Glass 6		Pts: Gilbert 26; Rebs: Mclaughlin 20; Asts: Bassett, Morelos 4
Eastern wins series 2–0

Nguyễn Du Indoor Stadium
Referees: Jontapa Nattapong (THA), Rendra Lesmana (INA), Neo Kai Chong (SIN)

== Final: (1) Saigon Heat vs. (2) Hong Kong Eastern ==
The final is a best-of-three series with game 3 being played if necessary.

11 March 2023
5:00 p.m.

Boxscore

Saigon Heat (Vietnam)	73–89	Hong Kong Eastern
Scoring by quarter: 20–14, 20–27, 14–26, 19–22
Pts: Gilyard 20; Rebs: Thomas 11; Asts: Gilyard 4		Pts: Gilbert 24; Rebs: Mclaughlin 11; Asts: Gilbert 5

Nguyễn Du Indoor Stadium
Referees: Preeda Muongmee (THA), Chan Owe Shiong (MAS), Rendra Lesmana (INA)

12 March 2023
5:00 p.m.

Boxscore

Hong Kong Eastern	70–88	(Vietnam) Saigon Heat
Scoring by quarter: 28–19, 9–19, 20–21, 13–29
Pts: Morelos 20; Rebs: Mclaughlin 13; Asts: Bassett, Chan, Mclaughlin 4 each		Pts: Gilyard 41; Rebs: Combs 8 Asts: Combs 8

Nguyễn Du Indoor Stadium
Referees: Preeda Muongmee (THA), Chan Owe Shiong (MAS), Harry Santos (PHI)

14 March 2023
7:30 p.m.

Boxscore

Saigon Heat (Vietnam)	60–73	Hong Kong Eastern
Scoring by quarter: 9–24, 17–12, 17–18, 17–19
Pts: Gilyard 23; Rebs: Gilyard 6 Asts: Gilyard 6		Pts: Morelos 19; Rebs: Mclaughlin 13; Asts: Bassett 4
Eastern wins series 2–1

Nguyễn Du Indoor Stadium
Referees: Preeda Muongmee (THA), Chan Owe Shiong (MAS), Rendra Lesmana (INA)

== Awards ==
=== Finals awards ===
2023 ABL Champions
Hong Kong Eastern
(2nd title)

Finals MVP
Tonny Trocha-Morelos

=== End-of-tournament awards ===
The winners were announced after Game 3 of the 2023 ABL Finals at the Nguyễn Du Indoor Stadium, Ho Chi Minh City, Vietnam.

- Defensive Player of the Year: Chris McLaughlin (Hong Kong Eastern)
- Coach of the Year: Željko Pavličević (Hong Kong Eastern)

== Statistical leaders ==
=== Individual leaders ===
Category	Player	Club	Average
Points	(United States) Kentrell Barkley	Singapore Slingers	26.00
Rebounds	(France) Alioune Tew	(Indonesia) Louvre Surabaya	19.00
Assists	(United States) Xavier Alexander	Singapore Slingers	6.60
Steals	(United States) Mario Chalmers	(Philippines) Zamboanga Valientes	2.40
Blocks	(United States) Amir Williams	(Malaysia) NS Matrix Deers	1.90
