= Alab Pilipinas all-time roster =

The following is a list of players, both past and current, who appeared at least in one game for the San Miguel Alab Pilipinas (ABL) franchise.

== A ==
Name	Number	School/University	Years with Alab Pilipinas	
Name	Number	School/University	From	To
Aaron Aban	27	Letran	2019	present
Val Acuna	21	UE	2016	2017
John Ray Alabanza	6	UE	2017	2019
Ethan Alvano	25	Cal State San Marcos	2018	2019

== B ==
Name	Number	School/University	Years with Alab Pilipinas	
Name	Number	School/University	From	To
Renaldo Balkman (World Import)	34	South Carolina	2018	2019
Jason Brickman	5	LIU Brooklyn	2019	present
Justin Brownlee (World Import)	32	St. John's	2017–18, 2020	present

== C ==
Name	Number	School/University	Years with Alab Pilipinas	
Name	Number	School/University	From	To
Andrei Caracut	30	De La Salle	2019	present
Sampson Carter (World Import)	7	UMass	2016	2017
JR Cawaling	6	Far Eastern	2016	2017
Robby Celiz	8	National-U	2016	2018

== D ==
Name	Number	School/University	Years with Alab Pilipinas	
Name	Number	School/University	From	To
Samuel Deguara (World Import)	21	Malta	2019	present
Lawrence Domingo (ASEAN Heritage Import)	3	Eastern New Mexico	2017	present

== F ==
Name	Number	School/University	Years with Alab Pilipinas	
Name	Number	School/University	From	To
Adrian Forbes (World Import)	14	Auburn	2019	
Jeric Fortuna	11	UST	2016	2017

== G ==
Name	Number	School/University	Years with Alab Pilipinas	
Name	Number	School/University	From	To
Anthony Gavieres	15	VCU	2016	2017
Jeremiah Gray	2	Moorpark	2019	present

== H ==
Name	Number	School/University	Years with Alab Pilipinas	
Name	Number	School/University	From	To
Jordan Heading	15	Cal Baptist	2019	present
Dondon Hontiveros	25	Cebu	2017	2018
Paolo Hubalde	0	UE	2016	2017
James Hughes	34	Northern Illinois	2016	2017

== J ==
Name	Number	School/University	Years with Alab Pilipinas	
Name	Number	School/University	From	To
Paolo Javelona	13	National-U	2017	2019
Ivan Johnson (World Import)	4	Cal State San Bernardino	2017	

== K ==
Name	Number	School/University	Years with Alab Pilipinas	
Name	Number	School/University	From	To
Igee Bobbie King (ASEAN Heritage Import)	9	Emilio Aguinaldo	2016	2017
Nick King (World Import)	55	Middle Tennessee	2019	present
Jens Knuttel	17	Far Eastern	2016	2017

== L ==
Name	Number	School/University	Years with Alab Pilipinas	
Name	Number	School/University	From	To
Lee Dong-jun (World Import)	40	Seattle Pacific	2016	
Lee Seung-jun (World Import)	14	Seattle Pacific	2016	

== M ==
Name	Number	School/University	Years with Alab Pilipinas	
Name	Number	School/University	From	To
Rico Maierhofer	10	De La Salle	2017	2018
Mark Jovet Mendoza	18	De La Salle	2016	2017

== O ==
Name	Number	School/University	Years with Alab Pilipinas	
Name	Number	School/University	From	To
Reggie Okosa (World Import)	9	La Salle	2017	

== P ==
Name	Number	School/University	Years with Alab Pilipinas	
Name	Number	School/University	From	To
Bobby Ray Parks Jr.	1	National-U	2016	2019

== R ==
Name	Number	School/University	Years with Alab Pilipinas	
Name	Number	School/University	From	To
Peter John Ramos (World Import)	36	-	2018	2019
Tzaddy Rangel	13	National-U	2018	present
Kiefer Ravena	15	Ateneo	2017	
John Raymundo	0	San Sebastian	2017	2018
Prince Rivero	0	De La Salle	2018	2019
Brandon Rosser	22	UC Riverside	2018	present

== S ==
Name	Number	School/University	Years with Alab Pilipinas	
Name	Number	School/University	From	To
Chris Sumalinog	24	Ateneo	2017	2019

== T ==
Name	Number	School/University	Years with Alab Pilipinas	
Name	Number	School/University	From	To
Caelon Tiongson	5	Biola	2018	2019
Hans Thiele	28	UE	2016	2017
Thomas Torres	27	De La Salle	2018	2019

== U ==
Name	Number	School/University	Years with Alab Pilipinas	
Name	Number	School/University	From	To
Josh Urbiztondo	2	Fresno Pacific	2017	2019

== V ==
Name	Number	School/University	Years with Alab Pilipinas	
Name	Number	School/University	From	To
Louie Vigil	18	UST	2019	present

== W ==
Name	Number	School/University	Years with Alab Pilipinas	
Name	Number	School/University	From	To
Prince Williams (World Import)	4	East Carolina	2020	
Khalif Wyatt (World Import)	1	Temple	2019	2020
