= Steven Guinchard =

Taiwanese-French basketball player (born 1993)

Personal information
- Born: July 14, 1993 (age 33) Annecy, France
- Listed height: 1.95 m (6 ft 5 in)
- Listed weight: 39 kg (86 lb)

Career information
- College: Emmanuel College
- Playing career: 2009–2010; 2016–present
- Position: Shooting guard
- Number: 80

Career history
- 2016–2018: Hong Kong Eastern
- 2017–2018: → Kinmen Kaoliang Liquor (loan)
- 2019–2020: Hong Kong Eastern
- 2020–2021: Cran Pringy Annecy
- 2021–2022: New Taipei Kings
- 2022–2024: Taipei Fubon Braves
- 2024–2025: Hong Kong Eastern

Career highlights
- ABL Champion (2017)

Steven Serge Marie Guinchard (Chinese: 張文平; born 14 July 1993) is a Taiwanese–French professional basketball player.

== Early life and education ==
Steven Serge Marie Guinchard was born on 14 July 1993 in Annecy, France to a French father and a Taiwanese mother He attended the Emmanuel College in Franklin Springs, Georgia in the United States.

== Career ==
=== Hong Kong Eastern in the ABL ===
After graduating from college, Guinchard went to Taiwant to join Pu Yuan Construction of the Super Basketball League in September 2016. However he left for Hong Kong.

He instead joined Hong Kong Eastern of the ASEAN Basketball League as their Asian heritage import. Guinchard is of Taiwanese-descent. He helped the team win the 2016–17 season title.

=== Kinmen Kaoliang Liquor ===
In 2017, Kinmen Kaoliang Liquor of Taiwan's Super Basketball League was able to loan Guinchard from Eastern. He won the SBL Rookie of the Year for the 2017–18 season. He did not return to Eastern due to the scrapping of the Asian import quota. He was supposed to play for the Taipei Fubon Braves in 2018 but left for personal reasons.

=== Second return to Hong Kong Eastern ===
Guinchard return with Eastern for the 2019–20 ABL season after regulations was revised so he could play as a local. However, the ABL went on an indefinite hiatus due to the COVID-19 pandemic.

To maintain fitness, Guinchard played for Cran Pringy Annecy of the French third-tier.

=== Return to Taiwan ===
In 2021, Guinchard was able to return to Taiwan to join newly-formed team New Taipei Kings of the P. League+. He was able to play for the Taipei Fubon Braves for two seasons from 2022 to 2024.

=== Third return to Hong Kong Eastern ===
Guinchard rejoins Hong Kong Eastern in September 2024 ahead of their campaign for the 2024–25 season of the East Asia Super League. He also played for Eastern at the 2024–25 Commissioner's Cup of the Philippine Basketball Association (PBA) where the Hong Kong team is playing as a guest team. He is noted to be the first player for a guest team to score a 4-pointer in the PBA.

== Personal life ==
Guinchard is married to Jessrine Celiz, a Filipino woman since July 2024.
