= Basketball at the 2019 SEA Games – Men's tournament =

Men's basketball tournament at the 2019 SEA Games
- Venue: Mall of Asia Arena, Pasay
- Dates: 4–10 December
- Nations: 8

Medalists
gold medal	Philippines
silver medal	Thailand
bronze medal	Vietnam

The men's basketball tournament at the 2019 SEA Games was held at the Mall of Asia Arena in Pasay, Metro Manila, Philippines from 4 to 10 December.

== Competition schedule ==
The following is the competition schedule for the men's basketball competitions:

P	Preliminaries	CM	Classification	½	Semifinals	B	3rd place play-off	F	Final

Wed 4	Thu 5	Fri 6	Sat 7	Sun 8	Mon 9	Tue 10	
P	P	P	P	CM	½	B	F

== Participating nations ==
- Cambodia
- Indonesia
- Malaysia
- Myanmar
- Philippines
- Singapore
- Thailand
- Vietnam

== Competition format ==
- The preliminary round was composed of two groups of four teams each. Each team played the teams within their group. The top two teams per group advanced to the knockout round. The other teams qualified to the classification round.
- Classification round:
  - 5th place: Third place teams played for fifth place.
  - 7th place: Fourth place teams played for seventh place.
- The knockout round was a single-elimination tournament, with a bronze medal match for the semi-finals losers. The losing team in the final was awarded the silver medal, while the winning team was awarded the gold medal.

== Venue ==
The regular 5-on-5 basketball tournament was held at the Mall of Asia Arena in Pasay.

Cuneta Astrodome was also previously considered as a potential venue for 5-on-5 basketball while the SM Mall of Asia Activity Center was considered to host the 3x3 basketball competitions.

Pasay	Basketball at the 2019 SEA Games – Men's tournament (Philippines)
Mall of Asia Arena	Basketball at the 2019 SEA Games – Men's tournament (Philippines)
Capacity: 15,000	Basketball at the 2019 SEA Games – Men's tournament (Philippines)

== Results ==
All times are Philippine Standard Time (UTC+8)

=== Preliminary round ===
==== Group A ====
Pos	Team	Pld	W	L	PF	PA	PD	Pts	Qualification
1	Philippines (H)	3	3	0	356	194	+162	6	Advance to knockout round
2	Vietnam	3	2	1	299	240	+59	5	Advance to knockout round
3	Singapore	3	1	2	238	271	−33	4	Qualification to 5th place match
4	Myanmar	3	0	3	181	369	−188	3	Qualification to 7th place match

Source: 2019 SEA Games
Rules for classification: (1) Tournament points, (2) Head-to-head tournament points, (3) Head-to-head goal average, (4) Overall goal average, (5) Drawing of lots
(H) Hosts

4 December 2019
12:00

Report

Vietnam	131–52	Myanmar
Scoring by quarter: 40–8, 30–11, 31–17, 30–16
Pts: T.T. Dinh 24; Rebs: Nguyen H.P.V. 12; Asts: Du 9		Pts: Aung Myint 14; Rebs: Aung Myint 10; Asts: Laja 5

Mall of Asia Arena, Pasay
Referees: Suebpong Wichaiphin (THA), Haryanto Sutaryo (INA), Wong Sing Hui (SIN)

4 December 2019
20:15

Report

Singapore	58–110	Philippines
Scoring by quarter: 13–30, 15–18, 20–29, 10–33
Pts: Kwek 10; Rebs: Goh 7 Asts: 4 players 2		Pts: Rosario 15; Rebs: Slaughter, Rosario 8 Asts: Ross 10

Mall of Asia Arena, Pasay
Referees: Chang Lu-yueh (TPE), Chan Owe Shiong (MAS), Nattapong Jontapa (THA)

5 December 2019
14:15

Report

Vietnam	99–78	Singapore
Scoring by quarter: 29–19, 11–12, 33–23, 26–24
Pts: Young 21; Rebs: Dierker 15; Asts: Dierker 4		Pts: Kwek 20; Rebs: Wong W.L., Goh 9 Asts: Wong W.L. 9

Mall of Asia Arena, Pasay
Referees: Yuen Chun Yip (HKG), Glenn Cornelio (PHI), Yuli Wulandari (INA)

6 December 2019
12:00

Report

Myanmar	62–102	Singapore
Scoring by quarter: 15–29, 14–35, 22–22, 11–16
Pts: Aung Myint 22; Rebs: Aung Myint 9 Asts: Aung Myint 5		Pts: Rengarajan 30; Rebs: Low 8 Asts: Toh 4

Mall of Asia Arena, Pasay
Referees: Nattapong Jontapa (THA), Francisco Olivar (PHI), Wong Sing Hui (MAS)

6 December 2019
20:15

Report

Philippines	110–69	Vietnam
Scoring by quarter: 27–19, 25–21, 28–17, 30–12
Pts: Fajardo 23; Rebs: Fajardo 12; Asts: Ravena 6		Pts: Dierker 28; Rebs: Dierker 9 Asts: Dierker 4

Mall of Asia Arena, Pasay
Referees: Yuen Chun Yip (HKG), Wichaiphin Suebpong (THA), Haryanto Sutaryo (INA)

7 December 2019
20:15

Report

Myanmar	67–136	Philippines
Scoring by quarter: 24–32, 12–45, 13–27, 18–32
Pts: Aung Myint 28; Rebs: Chin Ta, Aung Myint 7 Asts: Laja 4		Pts: Wright 29; Rebs: Manuel 11; Asts: Ross 9

Mall of Asia Arena, Pasay
Referees: Haryanto Sutaryo (INA), Triệu Chí Thành (VIE), Chan Owe Shiong (MAS)

==== Group B ====
Pos	Team	Pld	W	L	PF	PA	PD	Pts	Qualification
1	Thailand	3	3	0	261	213	+48	6	Advance to knockout round
2	Indonesia	3	2	1	277	261	+16	5	Advance to knockout round
3	Malaysia	3	1	2	261	245	+16	4	Qualification to 5th place match
4	Cambodia	3	0	3	203	283	−80	3	Qualification to 7th place match

Source: 2019 SEA Games
Rules for classification: (1) Tournament points, (2) Head-to-head tournament points, (3) Head-to-head goal average, (4) Overall goal average, (5) Drawing of lots

4 December 2019
14:15

Report

Thailand	98–76	Indonesia
Scoring by quarter: 34–17, 21–21, 20–23, 23–15
Pts: Suttisin 18; Rebs: Jakrawan 7 Asts: Muongboon 6		Pts: Gemilang 20; Rebs: Gemilang 10; Asts: Lakudu 4

Mall of Asia Arena, Pasay
Referees: Yuen Chun Yip (HKG), Ferdinand Pascual (PHI), Linn Maung (MYA)

5 December 2019
12:00

Report

Cambodia	68–83	Thailand
Scoring by quarter: 8–23, 15–19, 14–24, 31–17
Pts: Hoeup 22; Rebs: Chea 12; Asts: Dar 5		Pts: Chungyampin 17; Rebs: Klahan 10; Asts: Leelapipatkul 7

Mall of Asia Arena, Pasay
Referees: Chan Owe Shiong (MAS), Dominique Pomar (PHI), Triệu Chí Thành (VIE)

5 December 2019
20:15

Report

Indonesia	101–92	Malaysia
Scoring by quarter: 30–17, 25–28, 28–22, 18–25
Pts: Grahita 25; Rebs: Gemilang, Wicaksono 8 Asts: Dhyaksa 7		Pts: Ting 17; Rebs: Ting, Lim 9 Asts: Teoh 4

Mall of Asia Arena, Pasay
Referees: Ferdinand Pascual (PHI), Chang Lu-yueh (TPE), Nattapong Jontapa (THA)

6 December 2019
14:15

Report

Malaysia	100–64	Cambodia
Scoring by quarter: 14–14, 28–22, 24–11, 34–17
Pts: Wong 32; Rebs: Lim 17; Asts: Lim 5		Pts: Hoeup 22; Rebs: Hoeup, Chea 6 Asts: Hu 4

Mall of Asia Arena, Pasay
Referees: Ferdinand Pascual (PHI), Tien Hsiao-lun (TPE), Linn Maung (MYA)

7 December 2019
15:45

Report

Cambodia	71–100	Indonesia
Scoring by quarter: 13–30, 17–27, 19–20, 22–23
Pts: Hoeup 42; Rebs: Hoeup 11; Asts: Chea 5		Pts: Dhyaksa 14; Rebs: Joni 11; Asts: Lakudu 7

Mall of Asia Arena, Pasay
Referees: Kumiko Kumagai (JPN), Nattapong Jontapa (THA), Dominique Pomar (PHI)

7 December 2019
18:00

Report

Thailand	80–69	Malaysia
Scoring by quarter: 20–17, 17–9, 23–20, 20–23
Pts: Lamb 22; Rebs: Jakrawan 9 Asts: Lamb 6		Pts: Ting 23; Rebs: Lim 15; Asts: De 3

Mall of Asia Arena, Pasay
Referees: Yuen Chun Yip (HKG), Ricor Buaron (PHI), Linn Maung (MYA)

=== Classification round ===
==== 7th place match ====
8 December 2019
15:45

Report

Myanmar	92–110	Cambodia
Scoring by quarter: 17–30, 28–26, 15–27, 32–27
Pts: Wana Aung 29; Rebs: Chin Ta 10; Asts: Chin Ta 9		Pts: Hoeup 35; Rebs: Chea 9 Asts: Chea, Dar 8

Mall of Asia Arena, Pasay
Referees: Ricor Buaron (PHI), Yuli Wulandari (INA), Francisco Oliva (PHI)

==== 5th place match ====
8 December 2019
20:15

Report

Singapore	89–75	Malaysia
Scoring by quarter: 24–18, 16–20, 24–19, 25–18
Pts: Wong W.L. 21; Rebs: Goh 9 Asts: Wong W.L. 5		Pts: Lim 18; Rebs: Lim 9 Asts: Teoh 4

Mall of Asia Arena, Pasay
Referees: Glenn Cornelio (PHI), Wichaiphin Suebpong (THA), Triệu Chí Thành (VIE)

=== Knockout round ===
Semi-finals
9 December
Thailand	101
Vietnam	95
9 December
Philippines	97
Indonesia	70

Gold medal match
10 December
Thailand	81
Philippines	115
Bronze medal match
10 December
Vietnam	86
Indonesia	71

==== Semi-finals ====
9 December 2019
15:45

Report

Thailand	101–95	Vietnam
Scoring by quarter: 28–31, 25–21, 29–26, 19–17
Pts: Muangboon, Jaisanuk 19; Rebs: Lamb 10; Asts: Lamb 6		Pts: Dierker 31; Rebs: Young, Dierker 10; Asts: Tran, Young 3

Mall of Asia Arena, Pasay
Referees: Yuen Chun Yip (HKG), Ferdinand Pascual (PHI), Haryanto Sutaryo (INA)

9 December 2019
20:15

Report

Philippines	97–70	Indonesia
Scoring by quarter: 24–20, 15–8, 39–17, 19–25
Pts: Standhardinger 14; Rebs: Fajardo 9 Asts: Wright 8		Pts: Kokodiputra 20; Rebs: Grahita 9 Asts: Dhyaksa 5

Mall of Asia Arena, Pasay
Referees: Chang Lu-yueh (TPE), Linn Maung (MYA), Nattapong Jontapa (THA)

==== Bronze medal match ====
10 December 2019
15:45

Report

Vietnam	86–71	Indonesia
Scoring by quarter: 17–19, 24–15, 26–20, 19–17
Pts: Tran 21; Rebs: Young 11; Asts: Dierker 4		Pts: Oei 17; Rebs: Oei 10; Asts: Grahita, Dhyaksa 5

Mall of Asia Arena, Pasay
Referees: Ricor Buaron (PHI), Glenn Cornelio (PHI), Francisco Olivar (PHI)

==== Gold medal match ====
10 December 2019
20:15

Report

Thailand	81–115	Philippines
Scoring by quarter: 17–25, 22–23, 15–40, 27–27
Pts: Lamb 33; Rebs: Jakrawan, Lamb 8 Asts: Lamb 6		Pts: Fajardo 17; Rebs: Fajardo 13; Asts: Ross 8

Mall of Asia Arena, Pasay
Attendance: 12,462
Referees: Chang Lu-yueh (TPE), Yuen Chun Yip (HKG), Haryanto Sutaryo (INA)

== Final standings ==
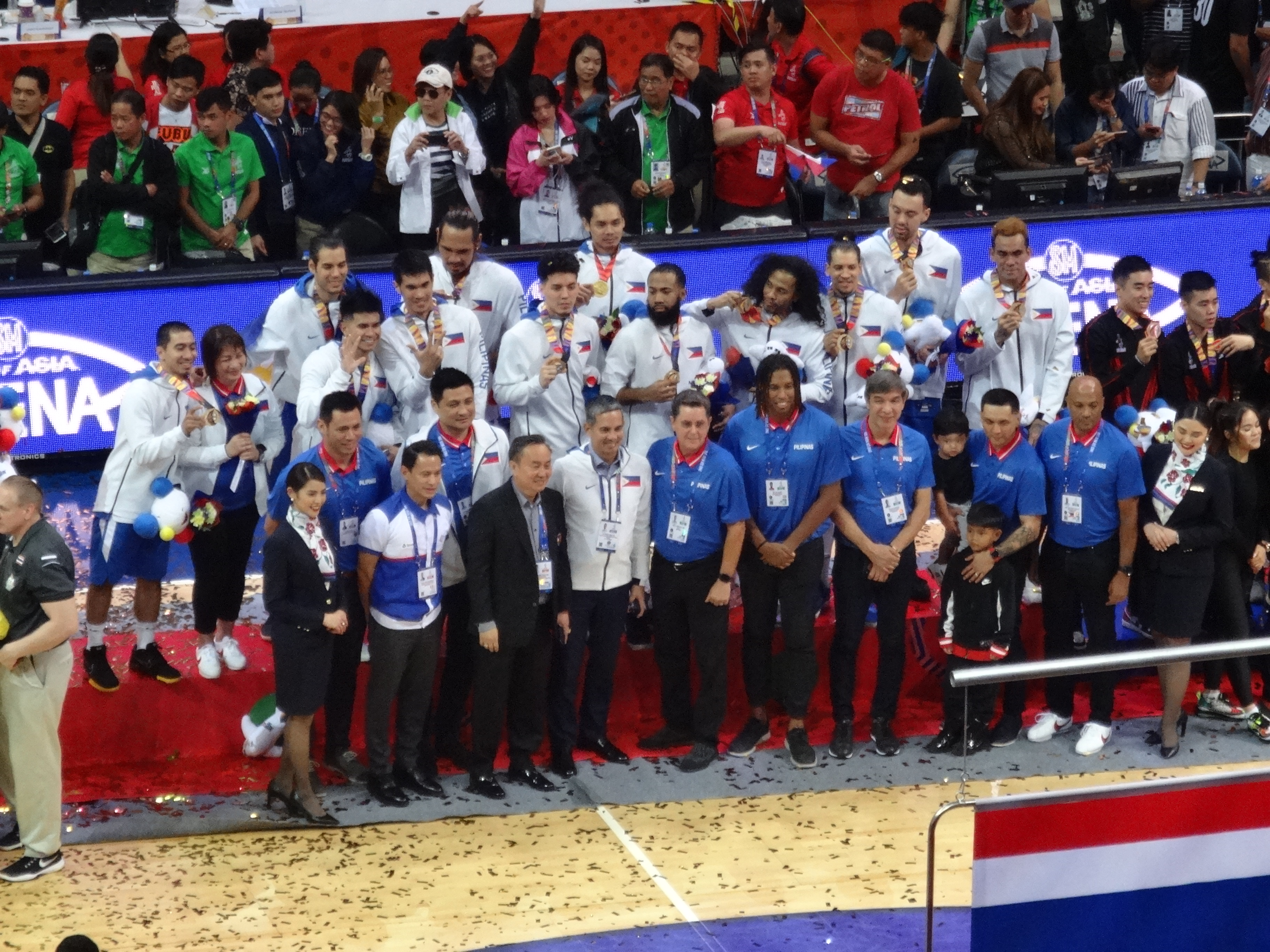
The Philippine national team at the awarding ceremony

Rank	Team
1st place, gold medalist(s)	Philippines
2nd place, silver medalist(s)	Thailand
3rd place, bronze medalist(s)	Vietnam
4	Indonesia
5	Singapore
6	Malaysia
7	Cambodia
8	Myanmar

== See also ==
- Women's tournament
