= Jeremy Combs =

American basketball player

Frankston Blues
- Position: Power forward / center
- League: NBL1 South

Personal information
- Born: November 24, 1995 (age 30)
- Listed height: 6 ft 7 in (2.01 m)
- Listed weight: 215 lb (98 kg)

Career information
- High school: David W. Carter (Dallas, Texas)
- College: North Texas (2014–2017); LSU (2017–2018); Texas Southern (2018–2019)
- NBA draft: 2019: undrafted
- Playing career: 2019–present

Career history
- 2019–2020: Köping Stars
- 2020–2021: Hapoel Ramat Gan Givatayim
- 2022: Maccabi Hod HaSharon
- 2023: Saigon Heat
- 2023–2024: Rockingham Flames
- 2023–2025: Tokushima Gambarous
- 2025: Nelson Giants
- 2025–2026: Earthfriends Tokyo Z
- 2026–present: Frankston Blues

Career highlights
- NBL1 South champion (2026); NBL1 South Grand Final MVP (2026); NZNBL All-Star Five (2025); NZNBL scoring champion (2025); 2× NBL1 National Finals All-Star Five (2023, 2026); SBL Center of the Year (2020); SWAC Player of the Year (2019); First-team All-SWAC (2019); Second-team All-Conference USA (2016)

Jeremy Tyrone Combs (born November 24, 1995) is an American professional basketball player for the Frankston Blues of the NBL1 South. He played college basketball for Texas Southern University, where was named the 2019 Southwestern Athletic Conference Player of the Year.

== College career ==
After a high school career at David W. Carter High School in Dallas, Combs committed to North Texas Mean Green men's basketball, where he played for coach Tony Benford. In three seasons for the Mean Green, Combs averaged 12 points and 8.2 rebounds for the team and as a sophomore was named second-team All-Conference USA. At the close of Combs' three seasons at North Texas, Benford was fired and subsequently hired as an assistant at Louisiana State University (LSU). Combs was eligible as a graduate transfer and followed Benford to Baton Rouge.

In his lone season at LSU, Combs was limited to six games as he struggled with the lingering effects of his ankle injury suffered at North Texas. Following the season, he and LSU parted ways, but he was granted a fifth year of eligibility and transferred to Texas Southern to complete it. Combs made the most of his extra year, averaging 17 points and 9 rebounds per game and earning Southwestern Athletic Conference (SWAC) Player of the Year honors.

== Professional career ==
For the 2019–20 season, Combs joined the Köping Stars of the Swedish Basketball League (SBL). He had a season-high 30 points in January and was named the league's Center of the Year. In 32 games, he led the team in points (19.1), rebounds (7.9) and steals (1.7) and averaged a team-high 30 minutes per game.

For the 2020–21 season, Combs moved to Israel to play for Hapoel Ramat Gan Givatayim. In 30 games, he averaged 20.4 points, 9.1 rebounds, 2.7 assists and 1.6 steals per game. He returned to Hapoel Ramat Gan for the 2021–22 season but left in mid December 2021. In 10 games, he averaged 14.4 points, 7.5 rebounds, 2.9 assists and 1.8 steals per game.

In January 2022, Combs joined Maccabi Hod HaSharon for the rest of the season. In 18 games, he averaged 15.2 points, 9.1 rebounds, 2.8 assists and 1.9 steals per game.

Combs joined the Saigon Heat for the 2023 ABL season. He helped the team reach the final and averaged 15.9 points, 9.4 rebounds, 3.1 assists and 1.6 steals in 19 games.

On March 30, 2023, Combs signed with the Rockingham Flames of the NBL1 West for the 2023 season. He was named to the NBL1 National Finals All-Star Five.

On July 19, 2023, Combs signed with Tokushima Gambarous of the B.League. Following the 2023–24 B.League season, he was initially set to join the Joondalup Wolves of the NBL1 West. After his contract was terminated, he returned to the Rockingham Flames in June 2024 for the rest of the 2024 NBL1 West season.

On June 19, 2024, Combs re-signed with Tokushima Gambarous for the 2024–25 B.League season.

On April 25, 2025, Combs signed with the Nelson Giants of the New Zealand National Basketball League (NZNBL) for the rest of the 2025 season. For the regular season, he averaged a league-best 24.4 points per game. He was named to the NZNBL All-Star Five.

Combs joined Earthfriends Tokyo Z for the 2025–26 B.League season.

In June 2026, Combs joined the Frankston Blues of the NBL1 South for the rest of the 2026 NBL1 season. He helped the Blues win the NBL1 South championship with a 78–75 grand final victory over the Eltham Wildcats behind his 21 points, 12 rebounds, five assists and three steals. He was subsequently named grand final MVP. At the 2026 NBL1 National Finals, Combs was named to the NBL1 National Finals All-Star Five for the second time.
