= Alen Abaz =

Hong Kong Eastern
- League: Hong Kong A1 Division Championship; East Asia Super League

Personal information
- Born: 23 July 1973 (age 53) Sarajevo, SR Bosnia and Herzegovina, SFR Yugoslavia
- Listed height: 1.87 m (6 ft 2 in)

Career information
- Playing career: 1990–1999
- Position: Point guard
- Coaching career: 1999–present

Career history

Playing
- 1990–1992: Bosna
- 1992–1993: Tigers Tübingen
- 1993–1994: Antalyaspor
- 1994–1996: Rottenburg
- 1997–1999: Bosna

Coaching
- 1999–2002: Bosna (youth coach)
- 2002–2008: Bosna (assistant)
- 2008–2009: Bosna
- 2008–2009: Tebnin SC
- 2008–2009: Bosnia and Herzegovina (assistant)
- 2010–2011: Sagesse SC
- 2011–2012: Bejjeh SC
- 2012–2013: Amchit Club
- 2013–2014: Homenetmen Beirut
- 2014: Bosnia and Herzegovina U-20
- 2014–2017: Al Mouttahed Tripoli
- 2018–2019: Al‑Muharraq SC
- 2019–2021: Baskets Oldenburg
- 2021–2022: Tigers Tübingen (assistant)
- 2022–2025: Bosnia and Herzegovina (assistant)
- 2025–2026: CS Maristes
- 2026–present: Hong Kong Eastern

Career highlights
- FIBA U20 European Championship Division B champion (2014)

Alen Abaz (born 23 July 1973) is a Bosnian professional basketball coach and former player who is currently the head coach of Hong Kong Eastern in the Hong Kong A1 Division Championship.

== Early life and playing career ==
Born in Sarajevo, Abaz began his basketball career in the youth system of former EuroLeague champion KK Bosna, progressing to the senior team in the early 1990s. He played as a point guard, featuring for Bosna before moving abroad during the Bosnian War. Abaz spent time with Tigers Tübingen in Germany and played for Antalyaspor in Turkey, before returning to Germany with Rottenburg. He later finished his playing career back at Bosna.

== Coaching career ==
Abaz transitioned into coaching in 1999, initially working as a coach in MV Basket, a private basketball academy founded by Mirza Delibašić, before being brought into Bosna's youth selections. He served as an assistant coach for the senior team from 2002 to 2008 and was appointed head coach of Bosna for the 2008–09 season. He also worked as an assistant coach with the Bosnia and Herzegovina men's national basketball team during this period.

Abaz's coaching career subsequently took him internationally, including head coaching roles in Lebanon with Tebnin SC, Sagesse SC, Bejjeh SC, Amchit Club, Homenetmen Beirut, Al Mouttahed Tripoli, and Al‑Muharraq SC in Bahrain. He also served as head coach of the Bosnia and Herzegovina under–20 national team, leading the side to victory in the FIBA U20 EuroBasket Division B and promotion to Division A in 2014.

In 2019, Abaz moved to Germany, being named head coach of Baskets Oldenburg, and later returned to work with the Bosnia and Herzegovina senior national team.
