= Hong Kong Eastern =

- Nickname: HK Eastern
- Leagues: HKA1; EASL
- Founded: 1932; 94 years ago
- Arena: Southorn Stadium
- Capacity: 2,000
- Location: Wan Chai, Hong Kong
- Team colors: Black, blue, white
- Head coach: Alen Abaz
- Ownership: Eastern Sports Club
- Championships: 4 HKA1; 2 ABL
- Website: easternsportsclub.com

Hong Kong Eastern basketball team
- Traditional Chinese: 香港東方籃球隊
- Simplified Chinese: 香港东方篮球队
Transcriptions
Standard Mandarin
- Hanyu Pinyin: Dōngfāng Lóngshī Lánqiú Duì
Yue: Cantonese
- Jyutping: dung1 fong1 lung4 si1 laam4 kau4 deoi6*2

The Eastern Sports Club (Chinese: 東方籃球隊), also known as Hong Kong Eastern (Chinese: 香港東方), is a professional men's basketball team of the Eastern Sports Club. The team also known as (Chinese: 東方男籃; lit. 'Eastern Men's Basketball').

Eastern competes in the Hong Kong A1 Division, and the ASEAN Basketball League since 2016. It has won the Hong Kong A1 championship four times, in 1956, 2017, 2023, 2025.

== History ==
Original logo

In 2015, the team won Hong Kong A2 Division Championship and promoted to 2016 Hong Kong A1 Division Championship. The team became fully professional in 2016. In the same year, the club would adopt the name Hong Kong Eastern and join the ASEAN Basketball League (ABL).

They won the 2016–17 ABL season, and finished as semifinalists for the next two seasons. They also became Hong Kong A1 Division champions in 2018. The ABL's 2019–20 season was cancelled due to the COVID-19 pandemic. It is scheduled to resume in 2023 with Eastern as among its participating teams. Eastern also plans to join the Chinese Basketball Association in the future.

Hong Kong Eastern won its second A1 Division championship in 2024. Also in 2024, Eastern joined the Philippine Basketball Association as a guest team for the 2024–25 Commissioner's Cup. They also simultaneously played games at the Hong Kong A1 Division Championship and the East Asia Super League. In June 2026, they joined The Asian Tournament.

== Home arenas ==
- Southern Stadium (2016–present)

== Season by season ==
Champions	Season champions	Runners-up	Playoff berth

Season	League	Regular season					Playoffs	Head coach
Season	League	Finish	Played	Wins	Losses	Win%	Playoffs	Head coach
2016–17	ABL	1st	20	16	4	.800	Won Semifinals (Heat) 2–0; Won ABL Finals (Slingers) 3–1	Edu Torres
2017	HKA1	2nd	7	6	1	.857	Lost Semifinals (Winling) 1–2	Edu Torres
2017–18	ABL	2nd	20	14	6	.700	Lost Semifinals (Alab Pilipinas) 0–2	Edu Torres
2018	HKA1	3rd	7	5	2	.714	Won Semifinals (Winling) 2–1; Won HKA1 Finals (South China) 3–2	Edu Torres
2018–19	ABL	7th	26	13	13	.500	Won Quarterfinals (Alab Pilipinas) 2–0; Lost Semifinals (Slingers) 0–2	Edu Torres
2019	HKA1	4th	9	6	3	.667	Won Quarterfinals (Fukien) 1–0; Lost Semifinals (South China) 0–2	Edu Torres
2019–20	ABL	9th	10	3	7	.300	Season cancelled*	Jordan Brady
2021–22	HKA1	4th	9	6	3	.667	Won Quarterfinals (Pegasus) 1–0; Won Semifinals (Tycoon) 2–0; Lost HKA1 Finals (South China) 0–3	Željko Pavličević
2023	ABL	2nd	14	10	4	.714	Won Semifinals (NS Matrix) 2–0; Won ABL Finals (Heat) 2–1	Željko Pavličević
2023–24	HKA1	2nd	9	10	0	1.000	Won HKA1 Finals (Tycoon) 3–1	Mensur Bajramović
2024–25	EASL	3rd in Group A	5	3	3	.500	Did not qualify	Mensur Bajramović
2024–25	PBA (Commissioner's)	7th	12	7	5	.583	Lost Quarterfinals (TNT) 0–1	Mensur Bajramović

*Note: Season cancelled due to COVID-19 pandemic.

== Current roster ==
2024-25 East Asia Super League Roster

Note: Flags indicate national team eligibility at FIBA-sanctioned events. Players may hold other non-FIBA nationalities not displayed.

Hong Kong Eastern roster
Players
Coaches

Pos.	No.	Nat.	Name	Ht.	Wt.
G	2	(Hong Kong)	Ho Yin, Wong	1.88 m (6 ft 2 in)
F	7	(Hong Kong)	Tsz Yung, Chu	1.91 m (6 ft 3 in)	90 kg (198 lb)
G	8	(Hong Kong)	Siu Wing, Chan	1.80 m (5 ft 11 in)
G	9	(Hong Kong)	Yin Lung, Cheung	1.91 m (6 ft 3 in)
G	11	(Hong Kong) (Canada)	Yang, Glen	1.93 m (6 ft 4 in)	85 kg (187 lb)
C	13	(Hong Kong)	Yuet Yeung, Pok	2.07 m (6 ft 9 in)
C	19	(Canada)	McLaughlin, Chris	2.09 m (6 ft 10 in)
F	21	(United States)	Clark, Cameron	2.01 m (6 ft 7 in)	95 kg (209 lb)
F	16	(United States)	Adam Xu	6 ft 5 in (1.96 m)	206 lb (93 kg)
G	22	(Canada)	Lam, Kobey	1.92 m (6 ft 4 in)	82 kg (181 lb)
F	23	(Hong Kong)	Ka Hin, Leung	1.91 m (6 ft 3 in)
F	33	(Hong Kong)	Ka Ho, Chan	1.96 m (6 ft 5 in)
G	35	(Hong Kong)	Muhammad Sulaiman, Sheikh	1.89 m (6 ft 2 in)	72 kg (159 lb)	27 – 19 March 1999
F	69	(Hong Kong)	Yiu Pong, Yip	1.95 m (6 ft 5 in)
G	80	(France) (Chinese Taipei)	Guinchard, Steven	1.95 m (6 ft 5 in)	87 kg (192 lb)

Head coach

- (Bosnia and Herzegovina) Mensur Bajramović

Assistant coach(es)

- (Chinese Taipei) James Chan

Legend

- (C) Team captain
- (I) Import player
- Injured

- Roster
Updated: September 30, 2024

2024–25 PBA Commissioner's Cup Roster

2024–25 PBA Commissioner's Cup Eastern roster
Players
Coaches

Pos.	#	POB	Name	Height	Weight	DOB (YYYY–MM–DD)	From
F	0	(Australia)	Hayden Blankley	6 ft 6 in (1.98 m)		2000–07–04	West Texas A&M
F/C	3	(Australia)	Ramon Cao	6 ft 8 in (2.03 m)		1997–11–04	Florida College
G/F	6	(Hong Kong)	Leung Shiu Wah	6 ft 3 in (1.91 m)		1994–03–25
F	7	(Hong Kong)	Chu Tsz Yung	6 ft 3 in (1.91 m)	198 lb (90 kg)	1996–06–28
G	8	(Hong Kong)	Chan Siu Wing	6 ft 0 in (1.83 m)	165 lb (75 kg)	1993–04–26	CityU
G	9	(Hong Kong)	Cheung Yin Lung	6 ft 3 in (1.91 m)		1999–11–29
G	11	(Canada)	Glen Yang	6 ft 4 in (1.93 m)	187 lb (85 kg)	1996–08–30	Mount Royal
C	13	(Hong Kong)	Pok Yuet Yeung	6 ft 7 in (2.01 m)		2000–06–07
C	15	(China)	Zhu Hao	6 ft 8 in (2.03 m)	238 lb (108 kg)	1999–04–19
F	16	(United States)	Adam Xu	6 ft 5 in (1.96 m)	206 lb (93 kg)	1993–02–16	NYU
C	19	(Canada)	Chris McLaughlin (CI / EI)	6 ft 10 in (2.08 m)		1992–07–30	UVic
F	21	(United States)	Cameron Clark (CI / EI)	6 ft 7 in (2.01 m)	209 lb (95 kg)	1991–09–16	Oklahoma
G/F	22	(Canada)	Kobey Lam	6 ft 4 in (1.93 m)	181 lb (82 kg)	2000–03–02	Charleston
G	23	(Hong Kong)	Leung Ka Hin	6 ft 1 in (1.85 m)		2000–02–01
G	35	(United Kingdom)	Sheikh Muhammad Sulaiman	6 ft 2 in (1.88 m)	159 lb (72 kg)	1999–03–19
G/F	80	(France)	Steven Guinchard	6 ft 5 in (1.96 m)	192 lb (87 kg)	1993–07–14	Emmanuel

Head coach

- (Bosnia and Herzegovina) Mensur Bajramović

Assistant coach(es)

- (Hong Kong) Lui Ho Yin Peter
- (Hong Kong) Wong Ka Kit
- (Hong Kong) Yu Chi Kit

Team manager

- (Hong Kong) Ho Chung Lit Lobo
- (Philippines) BJ Manalo

Legend

- (C) Team captain
- (CI) Commissioner's Cup Import
- (GI) Governors' Cup Import
- (EI) EASL Import
- (DP) Unsigned draft pick
- (FA) Free agent
- (IN) Inactive
- (S) Suspended
- (R) Rookie
- Injured

== Past roster ==
=== 2026–27 East Asia Super League roster ===
Note: Flags indicate national team eligibility at FIBA-sanctioned events. Players may hold other non-FIBA nationalities not displayed.

Hong Kong Eastern roster
Players
Coaches

Pos.	No.	Nat.	Name	Ht.	Wt.	DOB (YYYY-MM-DD)
G	8	(Hong Kong)	Siu Wing, Chan (C)	1.83 m (6 ft 0 in)	75 kg (165 lb)	34 – 26 April 1992
G	35	(Hong Kong)	Muhammad Sulaiman, Sheikh (C)	1.88 m (6 ft 2 in)	71 kg (157 lb)	27 – 3 March 1999
G	6	(Hong Kong)	Man Fai, Au (C)	1.85 m (6 ft 1 in)	80 kg (176 lb)	27 – 21 September 1999
C	0	(United States)	Linguard Jr, Carlton (WI)	2.13 m (7 ft 0 in)	102 kg (225 lb)	25 – 24 July 2001
C	25	(Lithuania)	Mockevičius, Egidijus (WI)	2.08 m (6 ft 10 in)	108 kg (238 lb)	34 – 1 September 1992
G	12	(Hong Kong)	Ming Tak, Wong	1.80 m (5 ft 11 in)	85 kg (187 lb)	30 – 12 April 1996
G	4	(United States)	Vining, Akili (WI)	1.88 m (6 ft 2 in)	84 kg (185 lb)	27 – 25 April 1999
G	21	(Hong Kong)	So, Pak Hin	1.83 m (6 ft 0 in)	80 kg (176 lb)	28 – 9 January 1998
G	30	(Hong Kong)	Zhong, Tsz Ho	1.82 m (6 ft 0 in)	74 kg (163 lb)	20 – 14 December 2005
G	1	(Hong Kong)	Chung, Chi Wing	1.82 m (6 ft 0 in)	80 kg (176 lb)
G	5	(Hong Kong)	Lam, Ka Mun	1.75 m (5 ft 9 in)	72 kg (159 lb)
G	7	(Hong Kong)	Zhong, Kevin	1.90 m (6 ft 3 in)	90 kg (198 lb)
F	20	(Hong Kong)	Sar, Yui Man	1.90 m (6 ft 3 in)	98 kg (216 lb)
F	23	(Kazakhstan)	Pan, Robert	2.00 m (6 ft 7 in)	105 kg (231 lb)	21 – 18 April 2005
F/C	33	(China) (Australia)	Cao, Ramon	2.02 m (6 ft 8 in)	100 kg (220 lb)	28 – 4 November 1997
G	4	(Hong Kong) (Canada)	Leung, Jenning	1.85 m (6 ft 1 in)	80 kg (176 lb)	31 – 7 July 1995	McGill
F	1	(Hong Kong)	Yik Wong, Ng	1.95 m (6 ft 5 in)	94 kg (207 lb)	22 – 23 May 2004
F	32	(Hong Kong)	Yang, Ivan	1.97 m (6 ft 6 in)	95 kg (209 lb)	23 – 16 June 2003
F	00	(Hong Kong)	Lo, Hok Ming	1.93 m (6 ft 4 in)	85 kg (187 lb)	21 – 6 August 2005

Head coach

- (Bosnia and Herzegovina) Alen Abaz

Assistant coach(es)

- (Hong Kong) Yu Chi Kit
- (United States) Burshaud Williams

Team manager

- (Hong Kong) Lee Shu Wing

Legend

- (C) Team captain
- (WI) World import
- Injured

- Roster
Updated: 18 September 2026

== Notable players ==
To appear in this section a player must have either:

- Set a club record or won an individual award as a professional player.
- Played at least one official international match for his senior national team or one NBA game at any time.

=== Local players ===
- (Hong Kong) Lam Man Chun (2018–22)
- (Hong Kong) Siu Kin Fan (2018–20)
- (Hong Kong) (Canada) Daniel Onwugbonu (2018–19)
- (Hong Kong) Chan Yik Lun (2018–22)
- (Hong Kong) Ng Chung Tsun (2018-22, 2024)
- (Hong Kong) Ng Yik Wong (2025-)
- (Hong Kong) Ip Chun Fung (2019–22)
- (Hong Kong) (United States) Adam Xu (2017–26)
- (Hong Kong) Chu Tsz Yung (2023-25)
- (Hong Kong) Chen Wan Tin (2021)
- (Hong Kong) So Sheung Ying (2017–20)
- (Hong Kong) So Pak Hin (2025-)
- (Hong Kong) Lo Hok Ming (2025-)
- (Hong Kong) Muhammad Sulaiman Sheikh (2019-)
- (Hong Kong) Wong Ho Yin (2023-24)
- (Hong Kong) Wong Ming Tak (2026-)
- (Hong Kong) Cheung Yin Lung (2023-26)
- (Hong Kong) Pok Yuet Yeung (2019-25)
- (Hong Kong) So Chi Lok (2017–20)
- (Hong Kong) Ip Chun Kit (2016–18)
- (Hong Kong) Lee Shu Wing (2017–18)
- (Hong Kong) Lau Tsz Lai (2015–20)
- (Hong Kong) Chung Chun Sing (2016–19)
- (Hong Kong) Zhong Tsz Ho (2025-)
- (Hong Kong) Chung Chi Wing (2026-)
- (Hong Kong) Kevin Zhong (2026-)
- (Hong Kong) Lam Ka Mun (2026-)
- (Hong Kong) Sar Yui Man (2026-)
- (Hong Kong) Wu Cheuk Pan (2016–25)
- (Hong Kong) Ricky Yang (2015–22)
- (Hong Kong) Ivan Yang (2025-)
- (Hong Kong) Yeung Ka Chun (2025-26)
- (Hong Kong) Leung Ka Hin (2019-25)
- (Hong Kong) Leung Shiu Wah (2024-25)
- (Hong Kong) Lam Man Kei (2025-26)
- (Hong Kong) Yip Yiu Pong (2024)
- (Hong Kong) Chan Ka Ho (2024)
- (Hong Kong) Chan Ho Kim (2025-26)
- (Hong Kong) Cheung Pan Yin (2019–20)
- (Hong Kong) Tang Chi Hang (2015–21)
- (Hong Kong) Ma Kong San (2019, 2021)
- (Hong Kong) Chan Siu Wing (2015–)
- (Hong Kong) Lee Ki (2015–22)
- (Hong Kong) (United States) Oliver Xu (2022–24)
- (China) (Australia) Ramon Cao (2024-25, 2026–)
- (China) Zhu Hao (2024-25)
- (China) Lee Yu Hao (2025-26)
- (Hong Kong) Ngan Wing Fai (2016–18)
- (Hong Kong) Poon Chi Ho (2015–17)
- (Hong Kong) Fong Shing Yee (2015–17)
- (Hong Kong) Cheng Kam Hing (2015–17)
- (Hong Kong) Wong Lut Yiu (2013–14, 2015–16)
- (Hong Kong) Lau Hoi To (2015–16)
- (Hong Kong) Heung Chun Keung (2015–16)
- (Hong Kong) Wu Kwok Fung (1992–94, 2014–15)

=== Imports ===
- (United States) Brandis Raley-Ross (2020, 2021–22)
- (United States) Brandon Costner (2019–20)
- (Philippines) (Nigeria) Joseph Eriobu (2019–20)
- (Philippines) (Hong Kong) Joshua De Villa (2021–25)
- (Canada) (Hong Kong) Glen Yang (2024-26)
- (Canada) Kobey Lam (2024-25)
- (Australia) Hayden Blankley (2024-26)
- (Philippines) (Hong Kong) Austin Veloso (2020–24)
- (Canada) (Hong Kong) Jenning Leung (2025-26, 2026–)
- (United States) Damian Chong Qui (2026)
- (United States) Ryan Watkins (2025–26)
- (United States) (Syria) Trey Kell (2019)
- (Palestine) Jamal Mayali (2025-26)
- (Kazakhstan) Robert Pan (2026-)
- (United States) T. J. Price (2019)
- (Croatia) Dominic Gilbert (2022–24, 2025-26)
- (Canada) Chris McLaughlin (2022–25)
- (United States) Michael Holyfield (2019, 2019–20)
- (United States) O'Darien Bassett (2019, 2022–23)
- (Colombia) Tonny Trocha-Morelos (2022–23)
- (United States) Isaiah Eisendorf (2024)
- (United States) Cameron Clark (2024-25, 2025-26, 2026)
- (United States) Carlton Linguard Jr. (2026-)
- (United States) (Azerbaijan) Ian Hummer (2025-26)
- (Malta) (Italy) Samuel Deguara (2018–19)
- (United States) Eric Ferguson (2018)
- (United States) Trey Gilder (2018)
- (Philippines) (Germany) Christian Standhardinger (2017–18)
- (United States) Josh Boone (2017)
- (United States) Jasonn Hannibal (2017–19)
- (Thailand) (United States) Tyler Lamb (2016–18)
- (Chinese Taipei) (France) Steven Guinchard (2016–17, 2019–20, 2024-25)
- (France) (Serbia) Alexandre Gavrilovic (2025-26)
- (Lithuania) Egidijus Mockevičius (2026-)
- (United States) Akili Vining (2026-)
- (United States) Patrick Sullivan (2016–17)
- (United States) Marcus Elliott (2016–19)
- (The Bahamas) Ryan O'Neal Moss (2016–18)
- (United States) Chris Barnes (2015–17)
- (United States) Reggie Johnson (2014–15)
- (United States) Bryant Austin (2014–15)

== Head coaches ==
- (United States) Burshaud Williams (interim) (2026)
- (Bosnia and Herzegovina) Alen Abaz (2026–)
