= Jordan Brady (basketball) =

American basketball player and coach

Personal information
- Born: June 21, 1983 (age 43) Salt Lake City, Utah, U.S.
- Listed height: 6 ft 6 in (1.98 m)
- Listed weight: 210 lb (95 kg)

Career information
- High school: Uintah (Vernal, Utah)
- College: Dawson CC (2004–2005); Salt Lake CC (2005–2006); Utah Valley (2006–2008)
- NBA draft: 2008: undrafted
- Playing career: 2008–2012
- Position: Forward
- Number: 32
- Coaching career: 2012–present

Career history

Playing
- 2008–2009: Basket Racing Club Luxembourg
- 2009–2011: Utah Flash
- 2011–2012: Los Angeles D-Fenders
- 2012: Idaho Stampede

Coaching
- 2012–2013: Iowa Energy (assistant)
- 2013–2014: Bakersfield Jam (assistant)
- 2014–2015: Los Angeles D-Fenders (assistant)
- 2015–2017: Salt Lake City Stars (assistant)
- 2017–2019: Wisconsin Herd
- 2019–2020: Eastern Long Lions
- 2021-2022: Windy City Bulls (assistant)

Jordan Brady (born June 21, 1983) is an American former professional basketball player and former head coach of the Wisconsin Herd under the NBA G League. Here, he created a 33–67 record, having a 0.330 with them in his 2-year career with them. He is also one of the assistant coaches of the Windy City Bulls under the NBA G League.

He played college basketball at Dawson Community College, Salt Lake Community College and Utah Valley.

He played internationally for Basket Racing Club Luxembourg. He played in the NBA D-League for the Utah Flash in 2009. In 2011, he played for the Los Angeles D-Fenders and the Idaho Stampede.

June 2024 he was hired as the Director of Player Development for BYU Cougars men's basketball.
