= Bangkok Tigers =

Bangkok Tigers Basketball Club, for sponsorship reasons known as Cooly Bangkok Tigers, is a Thai professional basketball team based in Bangkok. Founded in 2015, the Tigers play in the Thailand Basketball League (TBL) and internationally in the ASEAN Basketball League (until 2023). They were founded by president Chuthigran Dongird, who was approached by the TBL to establish a new team. Their home games are played at the Nimibutr Stadium.
