= Justin Howard =

American basketball player (born 1981)

Personal information
- Born: August 22, 1981 (age 45) Orlando, Florida, U.S.
- Listed height: 6 ft 11 in (2.11 m)
- Listed weight: 255 lb (116 kg)

Career information
- College: Mercer (1999–2003)
- NBA draft: 2003: undrafted
- Playing career: 2003–2018
- Position: Center

Career history
- 2003: Zorros de Morelia
- 2003: Quilmes de Mar del Plata
- 2004: U. Catolica
- 2005: Fuerza Regia de Monterrey
- 2006: Fuerza Guinda de Nogales
- 2006: Halcones Rojos Veracruz
- 2007: Gimnasia y Esgrima
- 2007: Al Jaish
- 2008: Fuerza Guinda de Nogales
- 2008–2009: BG Karlsruhe
- 2009–2010: CB Guadalajara
- 2010–2011: BC Andorra
- 2011–2012: BG Karlsruhe
- 2013: Saigon Heat
- 2013: PEA
- 2014: Hi-Tech Bangkok City
- 2015–2017: Singapore Slingers
- 2017–2018: Chong Son Kung Fu
- 2018: Hi-Tech Bangkok City
- 2018: Thai General Equipment

Career highlights
- ABL Defensive Player of the Year (2016–17)

Justin Aronel Howard (born August 22, 1981) is an American former professional basketball player.

== College career ==
Howard played for Mercer University in Macon, Georgia, from 1999 to 2003. He was one of the team captains in his final season, in which the Mercer Bears were crowned Atlantic Sun Conference champions, as well as all-academic for three out of four years. Now he is 6'11" and 255 lbs but when he entered Mercer in 1999 he was 6'9" and 335lbs..

== Professional career ==
After completing his college career in 2003, he played his first year as a professional in Mexico for the Zorros de Morelia from the Liga Nacional de Baloncesto Profesional, averaging 21.7 points and 10.8 rebounds per game while shooting 58% from the field. He finished the season as the league leader in rebounding.

In 2004, he played in the Liga Sudamericana in Chile, averaging 22.1 points, 10.7 rebounds, 2.3 steals per game, and 56% field goal percentage. His team was the first team from Chile to win the group stage and qualify for the knockout round of the South American Basketball Championship. He also played briefly in Argentina and China in 2004.

In 2005, he returned to play in Mexico scoring 24.7 points, 11.8 rebounds, 64% field goal, and 2 assist per game, finishing the season second in league rebounding and third in scoring. All while leading Fuerza Regia de Monterrey to the conference finals in the process.

He spent all of 2006 in 2 different leagues in Mexico, he played for Circuito de Baloncesto de la Costa del Pacífico (CIBACOPA) scoring 34 points per game, and also the Halcones Rojos Veracruz in the Liga Nacional de Baloncesto Profesional. In 2007, he played in Argentina for defending champion Comodoro Rivadavia in the top Argentinian league as well as in the South American Championships. He also played briefly in Syria in 2007.

In 2008, he played for Fuerza Guinda de Nogales in the CIBACOPA and finished second in league in rebounding and second in blocks. He averaged 22.7 points, 10.9 rebounds, 67% field goal percentage and 1.8 blocks per game. In the season of 2008–2009 he started his European career in the Pro A German 2nd Basketball Bundesliga with the team BG Karlsruhe. In that season he finished fourth in the league in rebounding and had averages of 14 points, 9 rebounds, 56% field goal percentage, and 1 block per game.

In the 2009–2010 season he moved to the LEB in Spain to play for CB Guadalajara. He received all league Honorable Mention honors and finished second in the league in rebounding. His averages were 14.8 points and 8.7 rebounds per game, all while shooting 59% from the field.

The following season (2010–2011) he would stay in Spain but move to play for BC Andorra, making it all the way to the league finals. All while averaging 10.5 points, 7.5 rebounds, 54% field goal percentage and 1 block per game, leading the team in rebounds and player efficiency, and being the number two scorer.

In the season of 2011–2012, after a successful first run with BG Karlsruhe, he returned for another period with the club in Germany. In that season he gave amazing performance averaging 16.3points, 10.3 rebounds, 60% field goal percentage, 70% free throw percentage, 1.1 block per game. He finished in the top 8 of scoring, and led the league in rebounding and player efficiency. When this season would be over he would be recognized by Eurobasket as the center of the year, all Pro A first team, all imports team, as well as all defensive team for the league.

In the year 2013 he moved to Asia playing for Saigon Heat from Vietnam which was playing for the Asean Basketball League in that season he would get yet amazing numbers averaging 20.43 points, 13.14 rebounds, 2 blocks, 1.7 steals per game. He finished the season leading the league in points, third in rebounding.

In 2013, he moved to Thailand to play for Thailand Basketball League scoring 26.8 points 15.7 rebounds 3 blocks per game, leading his team to the semifinals in the process.

In 2014 Howard played in the Thailand Basketball League for the defending champion Hi-Tech Bangkok City.

Since 2015, he has been playing in the Asean Basketball League again, this time for the Singapore Slingers.
