= Tyler Lamb =

Thai-American basketball player (born 1991)

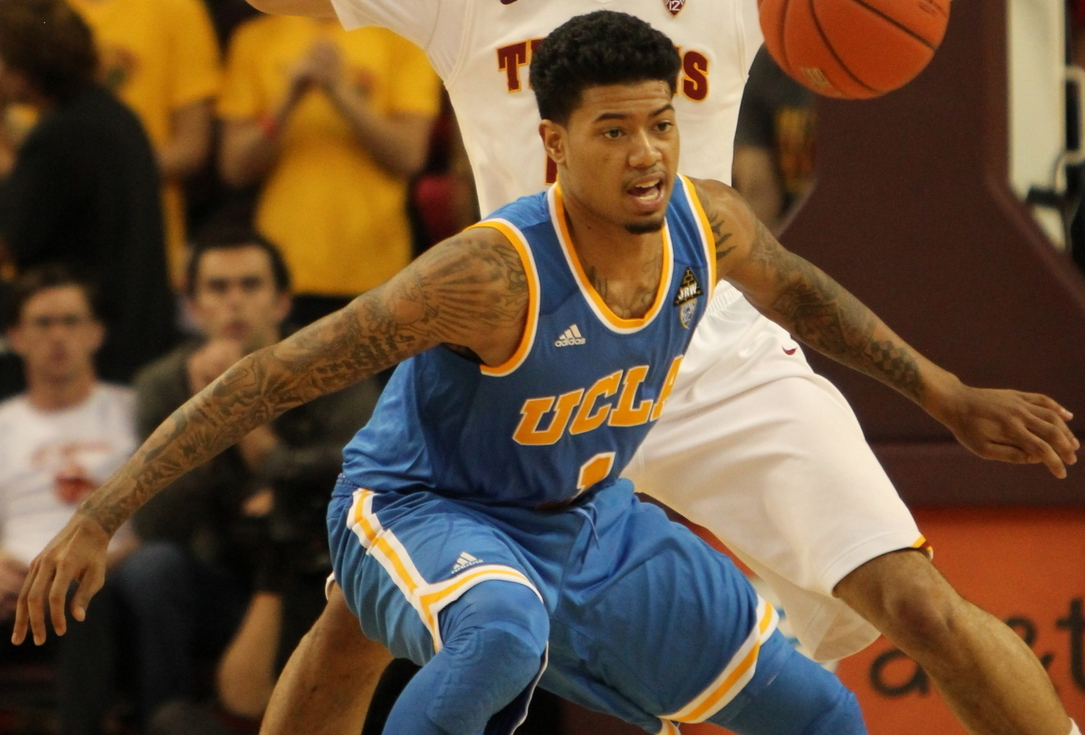
- Lamb with UCLA in 2012

Personal information
- Born: May 16, 1991 (age 35) West Covina, California, U.S.
- Listed height: 6 ft 5 in (1.96 m)
- Listed weight: 207 lb (94 kg)

Career information
- High school: Mater Dei (Santa Ana, California)
- College: UCLA (2010–2013); Long Beach State (2013–2015)
- NBA draft: 2015: undrafted
- Playing career: 2015–present
- Position: Small forward
- Number: 8

Career history
- 2015–2016: Hi-Tech
- 2016–2018: Hong Kong Eastern
- 2018: Hi-Tech
- 2018: Tycoon
- 2019–2020: Mono Vampire
- 2022: TaiwanBeer HeroBears
- 2024: Hi-Tech
- 2024–2025: Kumamoto Volters

Career highlights
- TPBL Best Shooting guard (2019); TBL champion (2018); ABL champion (2017); ABL ASEAN Heritage Import MVP (2017); Second-team All-Big West (2014)
Medals
Men's basketball
Representing Thailand
Southeast Asian Games
Silver medal – second place	2019 Philippines	Team
Bronze medal – third place	2017 Kuala Lumpur	Team
Bronze medal – third place	2023 Cambodia	Team

Tyler Lamb (born May 16, 1991) is a Thai-American professional basketball player. He played college basketball for UCLA and Long Beach State. Tyler began his professional career in his mother's homeland, Thailand.

== Early life ==
Lamb was born in West Covina, California. His mother, Cherry, is Thai, and his father, Terry, is African-American. Lamb attended Mater Dei High in Santa Ana.

== College career ==
Lamb started his college career for the UCLA Bruins in 2010. After three years, he transferred to Long Beach State. After starting all but one game for the Bruins in 2011–12, he was concerned about not receiving enough playing time with Larry Drew II, Shabazz Muhammad, Kyle Anderson, Jordan Adams and Norman Powell in the mix at guard for UCLA. He averaged 5.8 points and 2.3 rebounds per game in his career with the Bruins. In his first season with Long Beach State in 2013–14, Lamb was named second-team all-conference in the Big West Conference.

== Professional career ==
Lamb signed with the TaiwanBeer HeroBears of the T1 League on February 23, 2022.

After playing for two clubs in Asia, Lamb signed a player contract with the Kumamoto Volters on July 29, 2024. The preseason match held on September 7 saw him start a team-high 15 points. Lamb was injured in the game on November 2, 2024, and placed on the injured list on the 12th. Lamb was removed from injured list on December 27, 2024, and returned play the next game. On January 18, 2025, Lamb participated in the 'B.LEAGUE ASIA RISING STAR GAME', scoring 8 points and recording 6 assists. However, from January 25 to March 15, Lamb was removed from the roster due to conditioning issues. Lamb returned to action on March 22 and appeared in every remaining game until the team was eliminated in the playoff semifinals. Having been placed on the free negotiation player list on May 9, Lamb concluded his player contract with the team on June 30, 2025.

== National team career ==
In 2017, Tyler Lamb played for the Thai national team at the Southeast Asian Games, where they won bronze. The following year, he made his FIBA debut in the FIBA Asia Cup 2021 SEABA Pre-Qualifier. The national team advanced to the 2021 FIBA Asia Cup qualifiers.

In 2019, he rejoined the national team for the 2019 Southeast Asian Games men's basketball tournament.
