= Chris Dierker =

Vietnamese American basketball player

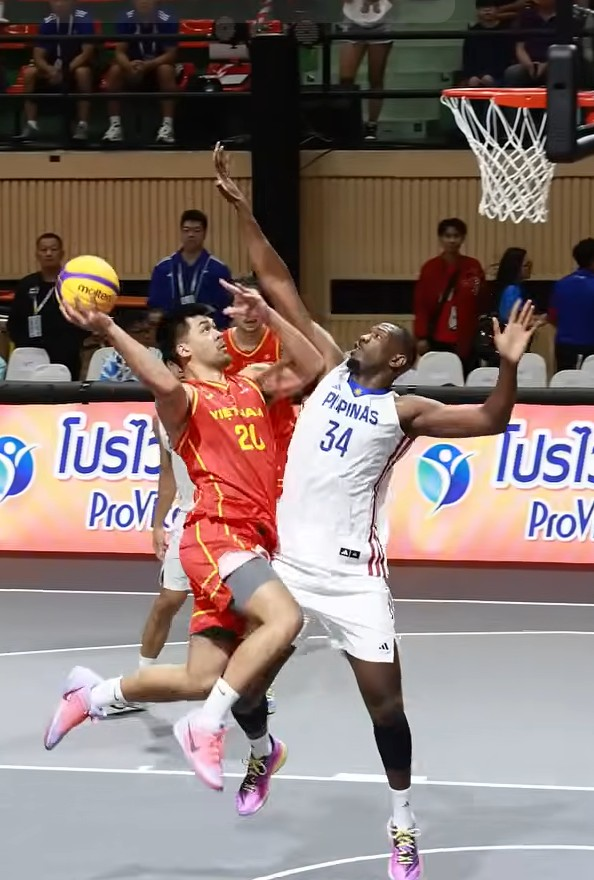
- Dierker in 2025

Personal information
- Born: August 11, 1994 (age 32) Canton, Michigan, U.S.
- Listed height: 200 cm (6 ft 7 in)
- Listed weight: 218 lb (99 kg)

Career information
- High school: Salem (Canton, Michigan)
- College: Madonna (2014–2018)
- NBA draft: 2018: undrafted
- Playing career: 2018–2020
- Position: Power forward / center
- Number: 20

Career history
- 2018: Danang Dragons
- 2018–2020: Saigon Heat (ABL)

Career highlights
- VBA Heritage MVP (2018)
Medals
Event	1st	2nd	3rd
Southeast Asian Games	-	1	2
Total	0	1	2
Men's 3x3 basketball
Representing Vietnam
Southeast Asian Games
Silver medal – second place	2021 Vietnam	Team
Bronze medal – third place	2019 Philippines	Team
Men's basketball
Southeast Asian Games
Bronze medal – third place	2019 Philippines	Team

Christopher William Dierker (Vietnamese: Đặng Quý Kiệt; born August 11, 1994) is a Vietnamese American former professional basketball player for the Danang Dragons of the Vietnam Basketball Association (VBA).

== Career ==
Dierker's mother Lien grew up in Danang, Vietnam. He attended Salem High School and joined NAIA school Madonna University. He was Madonna's career leader in rebounds (908) and was first in rebound average (7.4 per game), while finishing with 1,483 career points, seventh all time at the university. In 2016, he set the school single-game rebounding record with 19 rebounds while scoring a career-high 29 points. Dierker graduated with a degree in biology.

=== Danang Dragons (2018) ===
Dierker was selected by the Danang Dragons with the first overall pick in the 2018 VBA draft.

On November 4, 2020, in an Instagram post, Dierker officially retired from the Vietnam Basketball Association and professional basketball.

== Career statistics ==
Legend
GP	Games played	GS	Games started	MPG	Minutes per game
FG%	Field goal percentage	3P%	3-point field goal percentage	FT%	Free throw percentage
RPG	Rebounds per game	APG	Assists per game	SPG	Steals per game
BPG	Blocks per game	PPG	Points per game	**Bold**	Career high

=== VBA ===
Year	Team	GP	GS	MPG	FG%	3P%	FT%	RPG	APG	SPG	BPG	PPG
2018	Danang Dragons	15	14	38.5	.490	.260	.470	11.1	3.2	1.6	1	20.5
Career		15	14	38.5	.490	.260	.470	11.1	3.2	1.6	1	20.5

== Awards and honors ==
=== VBA ===
- Heritage MVP: 2018
