= Chan Siu Wing =

Hong Kong basketball player (born 1993)

No. 8 – Hong Kong Eastern
- Position: Point guard
- League: Hong Kong A1 Division Championship

Personal information
- Born: 26 April 1992 (age 34) Hong Kong
- Listed height: 5 ft 11 in (1.80 m)
- Listed weight: 165 lb (75 kg)

Career information
- High school: CNEC Christian College; Ying Wa College
- College: City University of Hong Kong
- Playing career: 2012–present

Career history
- 2009–2015: Winling
- 2015–present: Eastern

Career highlights
- ABL Champion (2017,2023); Hong Kong A1 Division Champion (2014,2015,2018,2024,2026)

Chan Siu Wing (Chinese: 陳兆榮; born 26 April 1992) is a Hong Kong professional basketball player who plays as a point guard for Hong Kong A1 Division Championship club Eastern.

He represented the Hong Kong national team at the 2015 FIBA Asia Championship in Changsha, China, where he played the most minutes for his team.
