= Southorn Playground =

Sports ground in Wan Chai, Hong Kong

Coordinates: 22°16′37″N 114°10′20″E

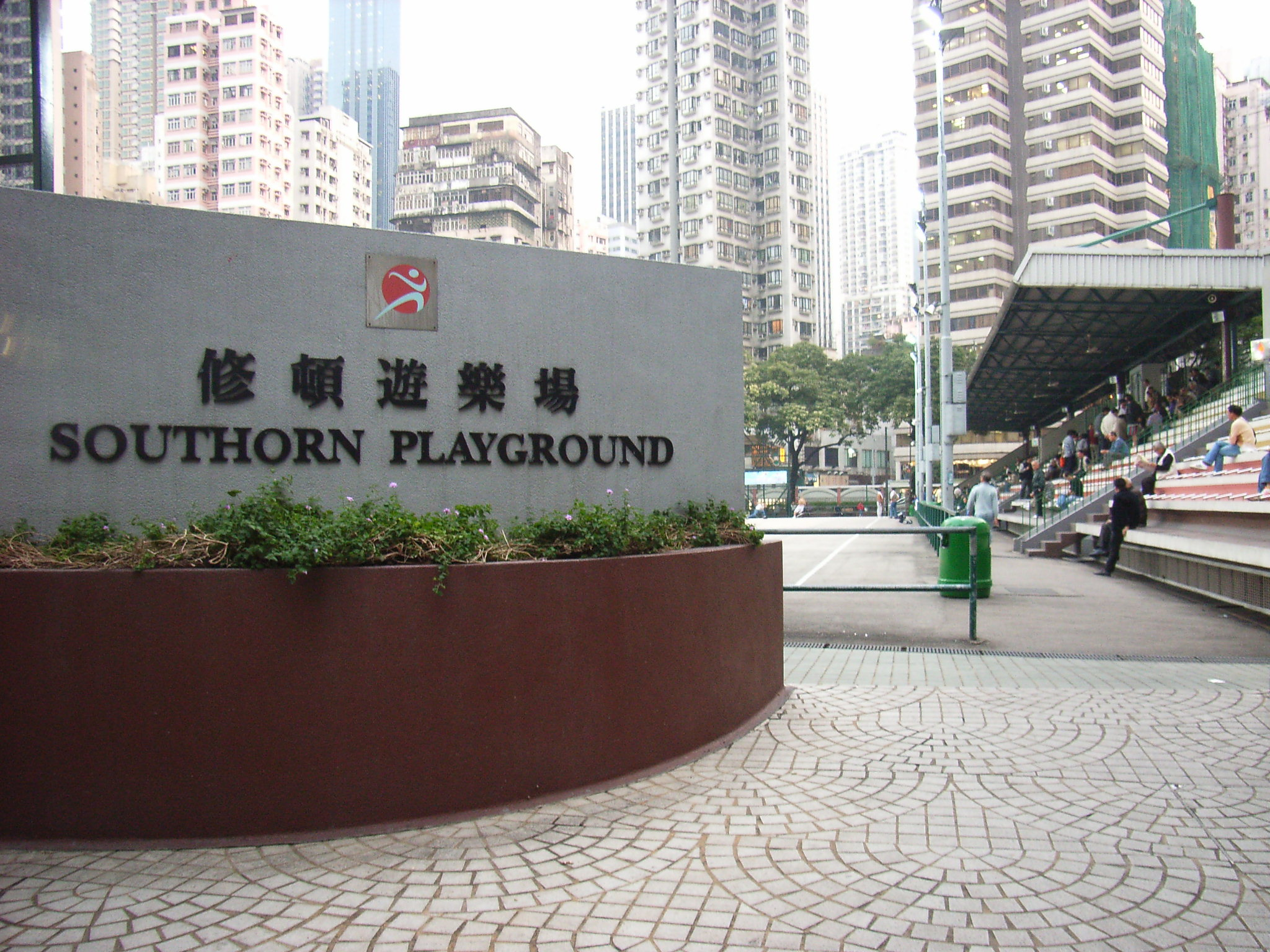
- Entrance sign along Hennessy Road in November 2005

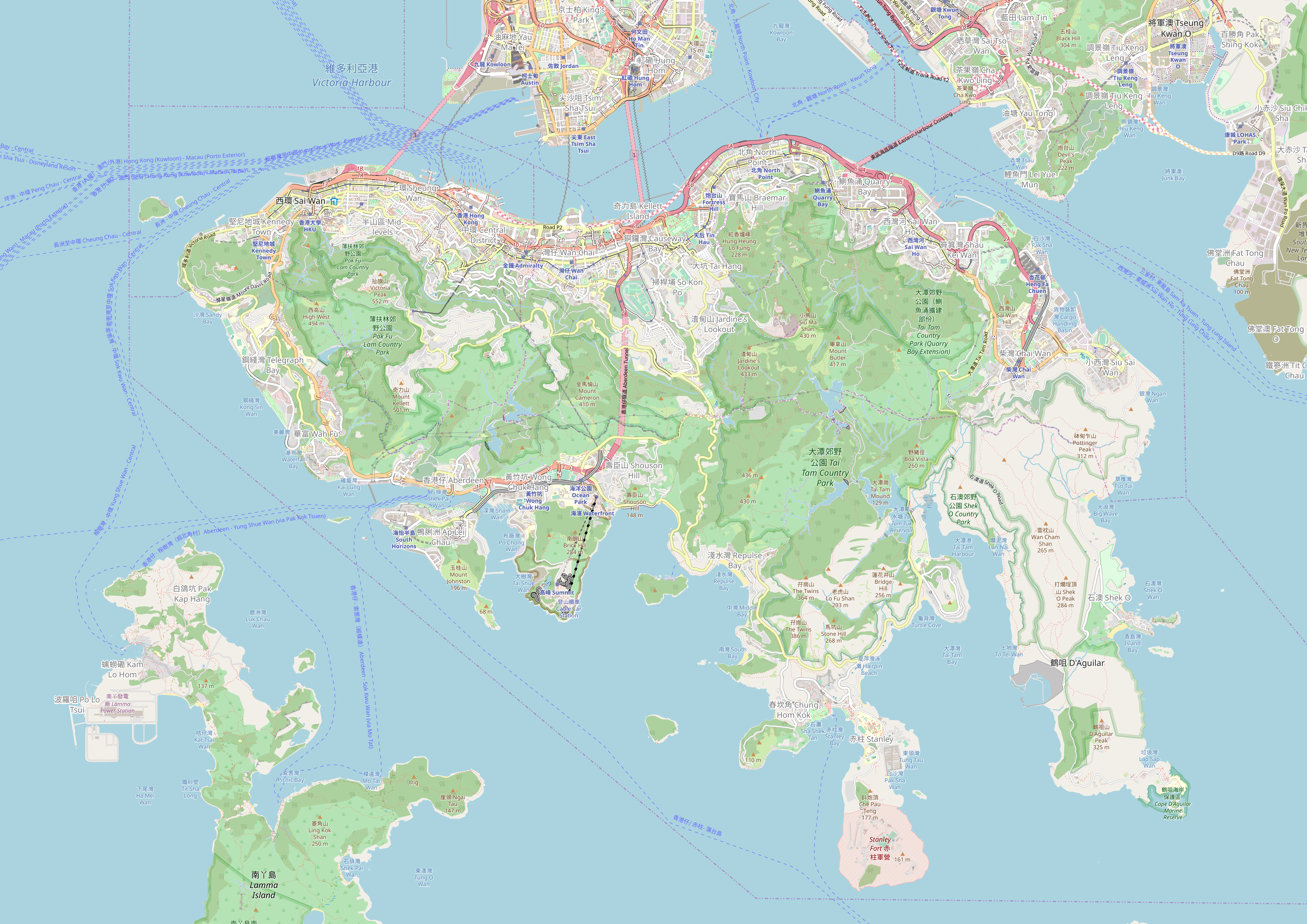
- Location within Hong Kong Island
- Type: Public park
- Location: Wan Chai; Hong Kong
- Area: 0.9 hectares (2.2 acres)
- Opened: 11 July 1934; 92 years ago
- Operator: Leisure and Cultural Services Department
- Open: Year round
- Public transit: Wan Chai station

Southorn Playground
- Traditional Chinese: 修頓遊樂場
- Simplified Chinese: 修顿游乐场
Transcriptions
Standard Mandarin
- Hanyu Pinyin: Xiūdùn Yóulèchǎng
Yue: Cantonese
- Yale Romanization: Sāu deuhn yàuh lohk chèuhng
- Jyutping: Sau1 deon6 jau4 lok6 coeng4

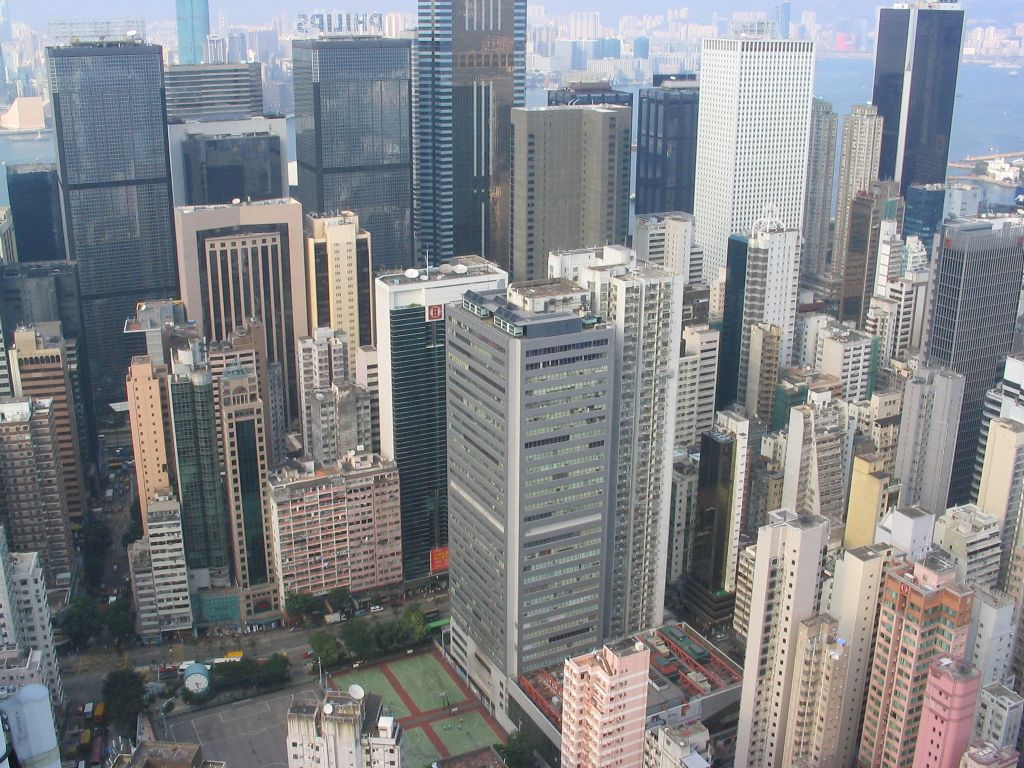
Southorn Playground (bottom left) in November 2006, surrounded by high rise buildings

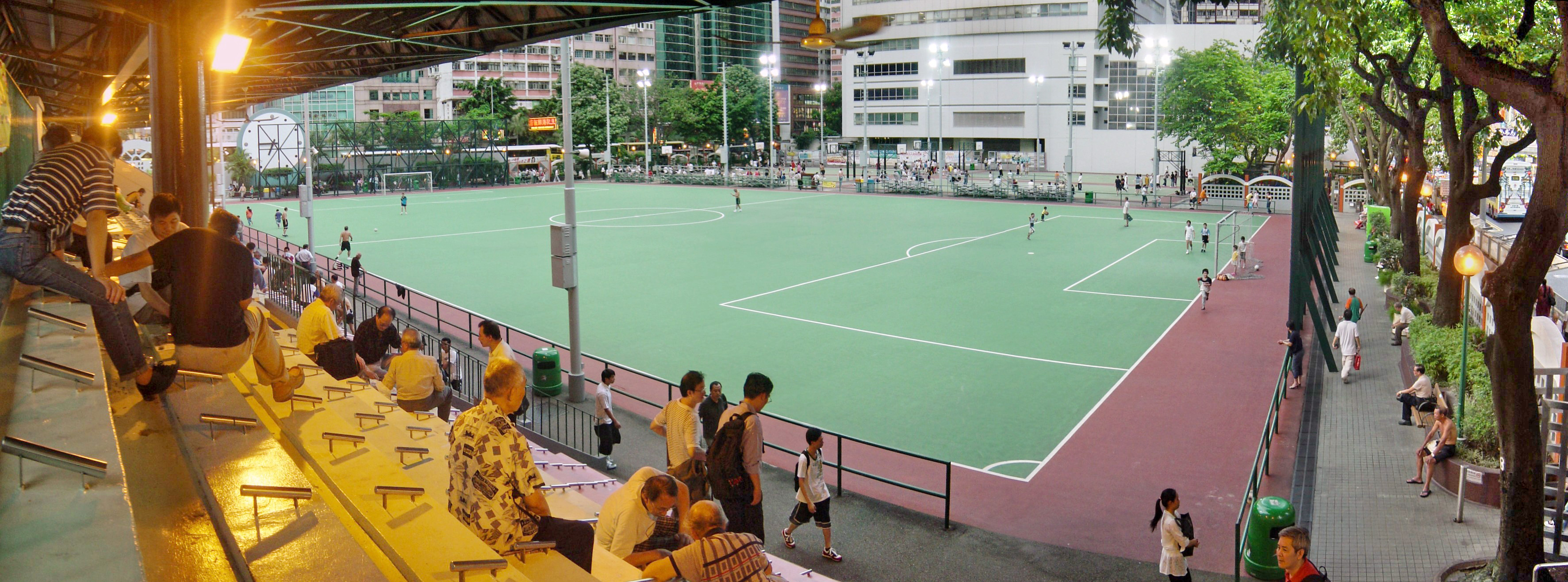
Residents relaxing and socialising around the football pitch in July 2007

Southorn Playground is a sports and recreational ground in Wan Chai, Hong Kong. It comprises a football pitch, four basketball courts, and a playground.

Southorn Playground is bounded by Hennessy Road to the north, Luard Road to the west, Johnston Road to the south, and buildings to the east. It has been Wan Chai's main recreational area since the 1930s. It was named in 1934 after Sir Wilfrid Thomas Southorn, the Colonial Secretary from 1925 to 1936.

Though the site is not big, it is often used for district functions such as fun fairs and sports matches. It is also popular among local residents as a place for daily relaxation and socialisation.

== History ==
=== Early years ===
The land on which the Southorn Playground sits was reclaimed from Victoria Harbour as part of the Praya East Reclamation Scheme during the 1920s. In 1929, the government set up the Playing Fields Committee to study the provision of playgrounds. The committee recommended setting aside areas for children, and Thomas Southorn suggested preserving the land between Johnston Road and Hennessy Road as a playground.

Two designated playgrounds, the Blake Gardens and the Wanchai grounds (today's Southorn Playground), were allotted by the government to the Chinese Y.M.C.A. and the Rotary Club, respectively. On 1 July 1933, the new Children's Playground Association (today the Hong Kong Playground Association) took over responsibility of these grounds. A public toilet and bathhouse opened on 12 February 1934 at the junction of Hennessy Road and O’Brien Road.

A formal opening ceremony was held for the then-Wanchai Children's Playground, officiated by Thomas Southorn and Rotary Club president Ts'o Seen Wan, on 11 July 1934. The playground was actually open in some capacity prior to the commemorative opening ceremony – an April 1934 news article stated that the facility already had an average daily attendance of some 275 children.

Following the Japanese occupation of Hong Kong (1941–1945), the government endeavoured to rehabilitate the derelict playgrounds of the territory. The Government Gazette announced on 11 October 1947 that the Southorn Playground would be re-allocated to the Children's Playground Association – unlike other playgrounds, which remained in government hands in anticipation that the Urban Council would ultimately take over their management.

The Children's Playground Association constructed the War Memorial Centre, a welfare and sports centre, in the eastern portion of Southorn Playground. It was completed in 1950 and offered children recreational opportunities as well as a library. A new covered basketball court opened at the centre on 5 June 1951. This eastern portion of the playground also hosted the Family Planning Association and the Violet Peel Clinic.

=== 1980s developments ===
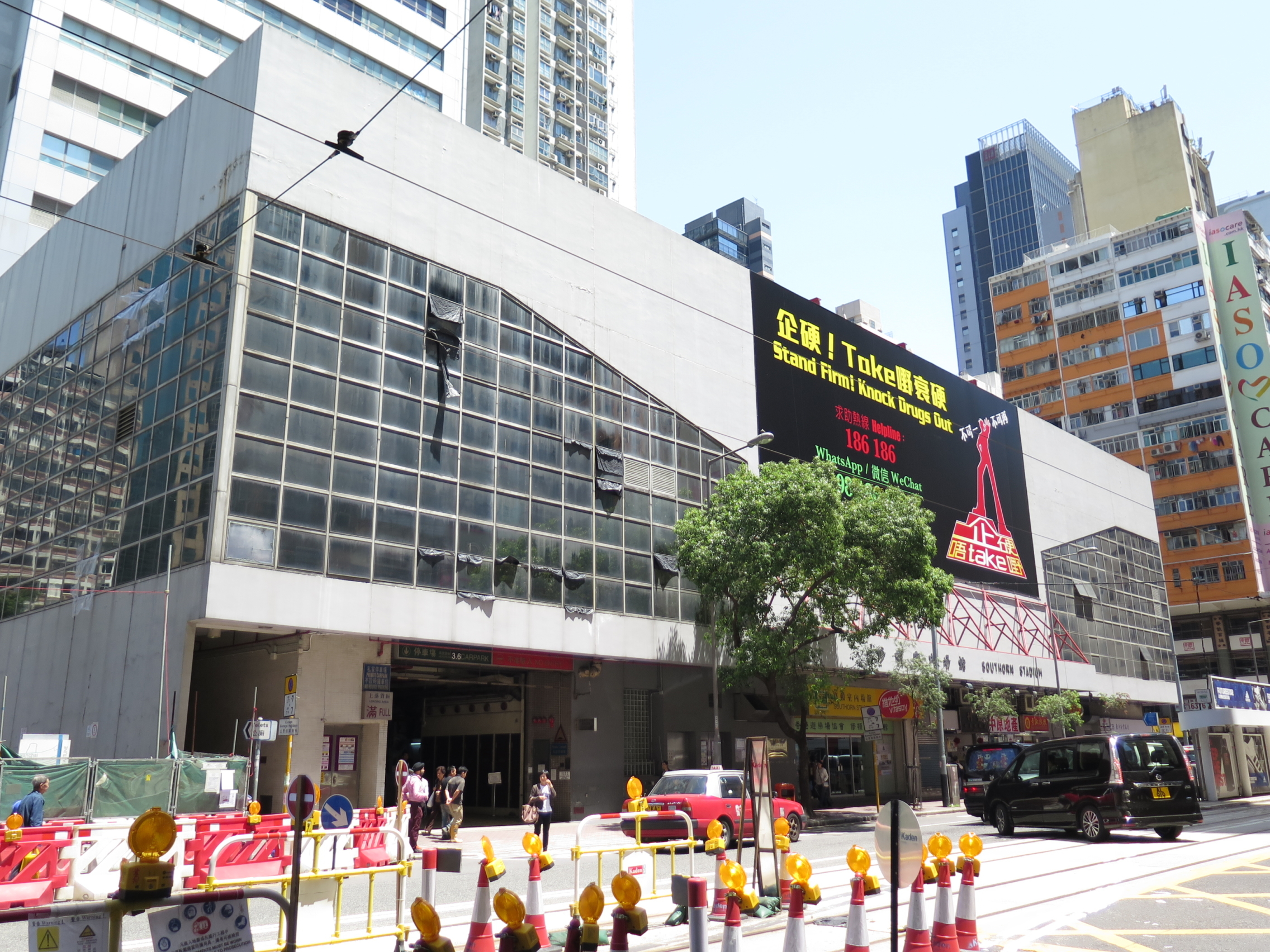
Southorn Stadium in April 2015, built to replace the War Memorial Centre

By the 1980s, the western outdoor part of the playground was managed by the Urban Council, while the Playground Association managed the covered stadium in the eastern part.

To make way for the construction of the Mass Transit Railway (MTR)'s first line on Hong Kong Island, the Island line, various Urban Council sites had to be borrowed or permanently alienated from the council's purview. The chairman of the council, A. de O. Sales, was adamant that the play areas of Southorn Playground not be encroached upon. In early 1981 the council agreed to hand over two sites at Southorn Playground: a refreshment kiosk in the northwestern portion of the park (now home to a railway tunnel ventilation shaft), and the site of the O'Brien Road Public Toilet, which had been demolished earlier.

In 1982, the Southorn Playground Temporary Market was constructed by the Urban Council to accommodate market stall lessees displaced during the redevelopment of the nearby Lockhart Road Market. It was located on the present-day site of the basketball courts.

The War Memorial Centre, Violet Peel Clinic, and Family Planning Association in the eastern part of the playground were all demolished to make way for the MTR station that opened on 31 May 1985 as part of the first phase of the Island line. They were temporarily relocated off-site during construction of the station.

On top of the station the Southorn Stadium (修頓體育館), Southorn Centre (修頓中心), and Southorn Garden (修頓花園, a residential building) were built. The Southorn Stadium is an indoor recreational complex, owned by the Hong Kong Playground Association, intended as a replacement for the War Memorial Centre. The Southorn Centre is a commercial building that houses many government offices.

The Violet Peel Methadone Clinic is now located on the ground floor of Southorn Garden, while the Family Planning Association is housed in the ground floor of the Southorn Centre.

=== 2005 redesign proposal ===
Wan Chai District Council and the British Council invited English designer Thomas Heatherwick and urban renewal specialist Fred Manson to improve the playground in 2005. The proposal aimed to redevelop the space through a public art intervention. It was hoped that the project would serve as a model of community participation in public art in Hong Kong. The project aimed to generally improve and update the playground, and make it an artwork in its own right.

An unnamed developer offered to pay for half the redevelopment while the District Council sought about HK$100 million from the government to make up the difference. The Leisure and Cultural Services Department was uninterested, stating, "In view of the keen competition for public resources for the development of much needed leisure facilities in other areas with greater urgency, e.g. new towns like Tung Chung and Tin Shui Wai, there is less priority for a redevelopment proposal which aims at adding value to an existing well-used venue."

=== 2005 WTO Ministerial Conference ===
Southorn Playground was originally one of the designated protest areas for the WTO Ministerial Conference of 2005 (MC6), which was held during 13–18 December 2005 at the Hong Kong Convention and Exhibition Centre. However, the government decided it would not be used for demonstration purposes after taking into account the Wan Chai District Council's view that the playground is too far from the Hong Kong Convention and Exhibition Centre (0.4 km away) and protesters may end up cramming in Wan Chai. The playground therefore was only reserved for MC6-related public activities such as public forums, bazaars and cultural performances.

== Use of facilities ==
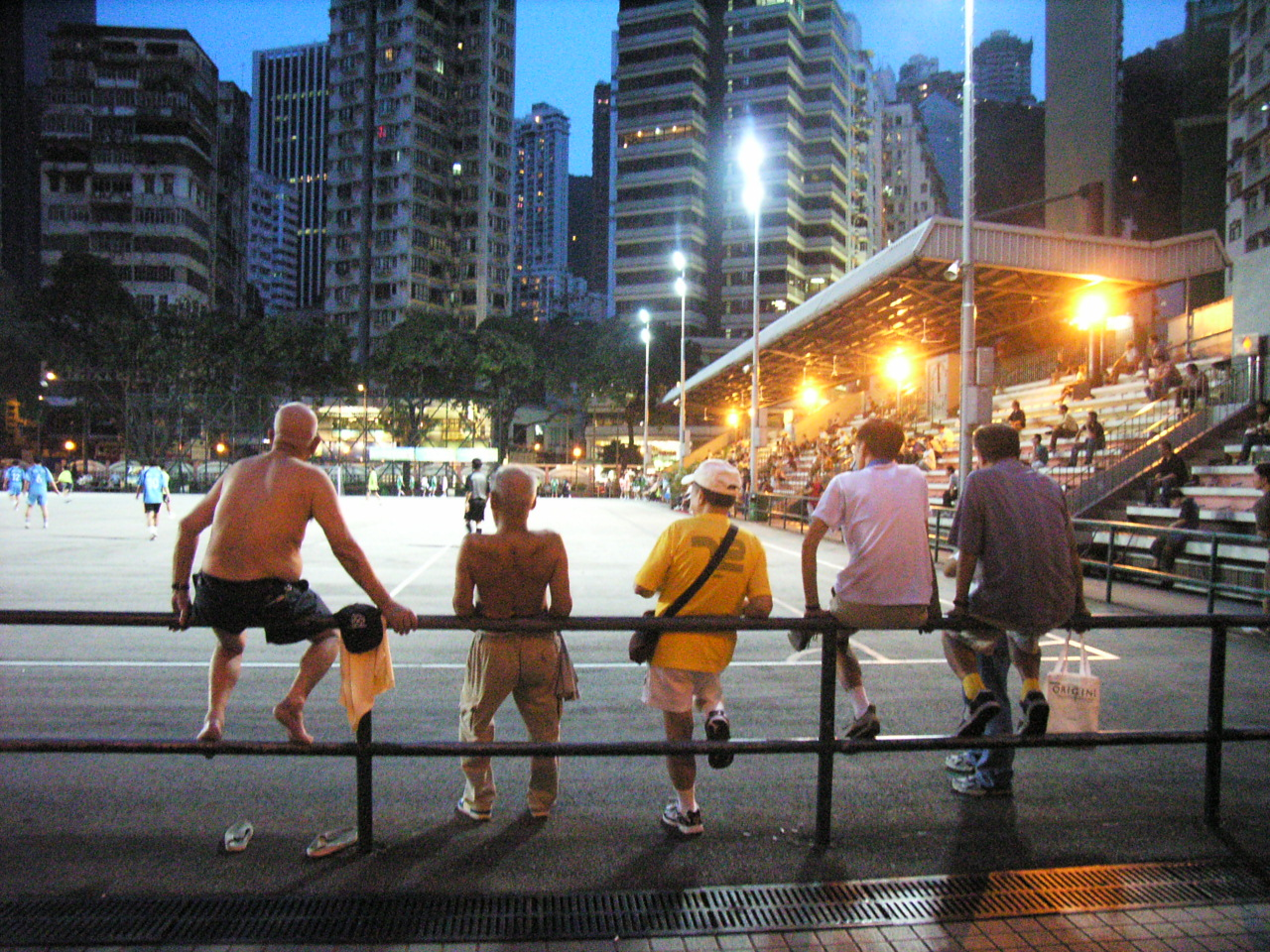
Southorn Playground at night in June 2006

Southorn Playground was a major landmark to senior residents of Wan Chai. Back in the 1950–1960s, it was a place of both work and entertainment. In the morning, labourers (commonly known as "coolies") gathered in the playground to start their day. In the evening, visitors enjoyed Chinese magic and kung fu performances, as well as street food.

Nowadays, senior citizens play Chinese chess there, while young people regard it as one of their favorite spots for football and basketball. The annual Adidas Streetball Challenge is held in the playground which attracts flocks of Hong Kong basketball fanatics and young spectators. It has also one of the most well-known basketball courts in Hong Kong, and street legends story often start in Southorn Playground.

== Recent developments ==
Southorn Stadium (the indoor arena building) was renovated in 2013. Under the Wan Chai Station Lee Tung Street Subway Scheme, a 100-metre pedestrian subway has been built to connect the redeveloped Lee Tung Street with the MTR station. The children's playground and one of the four basketball courts at Southorn Playground have been periodically closed to facilitate construction.

Additionally, the Civil Engineering and Development Department has commissioned a study into increasing the use of underground space in densely built-up areas. The study focuses on Tsim Sha Tsui, Causeway Bay, Happy Valley, and Admiralty/Wan Chai. Southorn Playground has been identified as one of the open spaces to be investigated for underground space development potential.

== See also ==
- List of urban public parks and gardens in Hong Kong
- Hong Kong Eastern
- Hong Kong Bulls
