= 2016–17 ABL season =

- League: ASEAN Basketball League
- Sport: Basketball
- Duration: 25 November 2016 – 26 March 2017 (Regular season)
- Number of games: 60 (regular season)
- Number of teams: 6
- TV partner(s): (Hong Kong) Cable TV (Indonesia) Skynindo (Philippines) ABS-CBN Sports and Action (Singapore) StarHub (Taiwan) Sportcast (Vietnam) HTV

Regular season
- Top seed: Eastern

2017 ABL finals
- Champions: Eastern
- Runners-up: Singapore Slingers

ABL seasons
- ← 2015–16 2017–18 →

The 2016–17 ABL season was the seventh season of competition of the ASEAN Basketball League. The regular season started on 25 November 2016 and will end on 26 March 2017.

== Teams ==
=== Venues ===
Locations of 2016–17 ABL teams. Red pogs are primary locations, while blue pogs are alternates. Alab Pilipinas played twice in every town where they were the designated home team.

Team	Location	Arena
(Philippines) Alab Pilipinas	Laguna	Alonte Sports Arena, Biňan
(Philippines) Alab Pilipinas	Laguna	City of Santa Rosa Multi-Purpose Complex, Santa Rosa
(Philippines) Alab Pilipinas	Bulacan	Baliuag Star Arena, Baliuag
(Philippines) Alab Pilipinas	Davao City	Davao City Recreation Center, Davao City
(Philippines) Alab Pilipinas	Davao City	University of Southeastern Philippines Gym, Davao City
(Philippines) Alab Pilipinas	Metro Manila	Olivarez College Gym, Parañaque
(Hong Kong) Eastern	Wan Chai	Southorn Stadium, Wan Chai
(Chinese Taipei) Kaohsiung Truth	Kaohsiung	Kaohsiung Municipal Kaohsiung Senior High School Gym, Kaohsiung
(Vietnam) Saigon Heat	Ho Chi Minh City	CIS Arena, Ho Chi Minh City
Singapore Slingers	Singapore	OCBC Arena, Kallang
Westports Malaysia Dragons	Kuala Lumpur	MABA Stadium, Kuala Lumpur
Westports Malaysia Dragons	Selangor	House of Champions, Gem-In Mall, Cyberjaya

=== Personnel ===
Team	Head coach
Alab Pilipinas	(Philippines) Mac Cuan
Eastern	(Spain) Edu Torres
Kaohsiung Truth	(Chinese Taipei) Sabatino Chen
Saigon Heat	(United Kingdom) Anthony Garbelotto
Singapore Slingers	(Singapore) Neo Beng Siang
Westports Malaysia Dragons	(United States) Chris Thomas

== Imports ==
The following is the list of imports, which had played for their respective teams at least once. In the left are the World Imports, and in the right are the ASEAN/Heritage Imports. Flags indicate the citizenship/s the player holds.

Team	World import(s)	ASEAN/Heritage import(s)	Former import(s)
Alab Pilipinas	(United States) Sampson Carter (United States) James Hughes	(United States) (Philippines) Igee King (United States) (Philippines) Lawrence Domingo	(South Korea) Lee Dong-jun (South Korea) Lee Seung-jun
Eastern	(United States) Marcus Elliott (United States) Josh Boone	(France) (Chinese Taipei) Steven Guinchard (United States) (Thailand) Tyler Lamb	(United States) Patrick Sullivan
Kaohsiung Truth	(United States) Chris Oliver (United States) (Hungary) Derek Hall	(Philippines) Raymar Jose (Philippines) Achie Inigo	(Philippines) Mikee Reyes
Saigon Heat	(United States) Lenny Daniel (United States) Jordan Henriquez	(United States) (Vietnam) David Arnold (United States) (Thailand) Moses Morgan	(United States) Christien Charles (United States) (Germany) Herbert Hill (United States) Haminn Quaintance (United States) (Philippines) Joshua Munzon
Singapore Slingers	(United States) Xavier Alexander (United States) Justin Howard	(United States) (Philippines) Josh Urbiztondo	(Australia) Luke Schenscher (United States) (Philippines) Alli Austria (United States) (Philippines) Rolando Gardner
Westports Malaysia Dragons	(United States) Skylar Spencer (United States) Kiwi Gardner	(United States) (Philippines) Joshua Munzon	(United States) Marcus Melvin (United States) (Israel) (Thailand) Freddie Goldstein

== Regular season ==
=== Standings ===
Pos	Team	Pld	W	L	PF	PA	PD	PCT	GB	Qualification
1	(Hong Kong) Eastern	20	16	4	1810	1610	+200	.800	—	Semifinals
2	Singapore Slingers	20	13	7	1592	1482	+110	.650	3	Semifinals
3	(Philippines) Alab Pilipinas	20	11	9	1591	1568	+23	.550	5	Semifinals
4	(Vietnam) Saigon Heat	20	8	12	1580	1676	−96	.400	8	Semifinals
5	Westports Malaysia Dragons	20	7	13	1684	1743	−59	.350	9	Eliminated
6	(Chinese Taipei) Kaohsiung Truth	20	5	15	1614	1792	−178	.250	11	Eliminated

Source: ASEANBasketballLeague.com

=== Results ===
==== First and second rounds ====
Home \ Away	ALP	HKL	KAT	SGH	SGS	WMD
Alab Pilipinas	—	61–83	91–82	99–77	66–71	87–79
Eastern	93–80	—	95–67	92–96	97–95*	87–70
Kaohsiung Truth	77–86	79–90	—	83–82	66–84	94–86
Saigon Heat	78–74	74–84	99–85	—	65–90	65–72
Singapore Slingers	71–68	82–72	84–76	73–75	—	80–62
Westports Malaysia Dragons	54–65	85–88	79–97	82–67	76–81	—

Source: ASEANBasketballLeague.com
Legend: Blue = home team win; Red = away team win.

*Overtime

==== Third and fourth rounds ====
Home \ Away	ALP	HKL	KAT	SGH	SGS	WMD
Alab Pilipinas	—	82–75	93–87	65–72	74–72	91–101*
Eastern	100–87	—	103–83	110–97*	71–77	96–87
Kaohsiung Truth	85–107	75–89	—	85–71	79–75	108–114
Saigon Heat	70–74	72–97	85–76	—	71–86	81–94
Singapore Slingers	62–64*	71–73	76–52	71–88	—	78–77**
Westports Malaysia Dragons	79–77	90–115	103–78	84–95	110–112*	—

Source: ASEANBasketballLeague.com
Legend: Blue = home team win; Yellow = draw; Red = away team win.

*Overtime

== Playoffs ==
Semifinals
1	(Hong Kong) Eastern	2
4	(Vietnam) Saigon Heat	0
2	Singapore Slingers	2
3	(Philippines) Alab Pilipinas	0

Finals
1	(Hong Kong) Eastern	3
2	Singapore Slingers	1

=== Semi-finals ===
The semi-finals is a best-of-three series, with the higher seeded team hosting Game 1, and 3, if necessary.

Team 1	Series	Team 2	Game 1	Game 2	Game 3
Eastern (Hong Kong)	2–0	(Vietnam) Saigon Heat	114–74	86–79	—
Singapore Slingers	2–0	(Philippines) Alab Pilipinas	77–67	82–64	—

=== Finals ===
The finals is a best-of-five series, with the higher seeded team hosting Game 1, 2, and 5, if necessary. The winner will provisionally represent the Southeast Asia Basketball Association (SEABA) at the 2017 FIBA Asia Champions Cup, unless a team outside SEABA wins; in that case, the best-performing SEABA team will be the provisional representative.

Semi-final 1 winner	Series	Semi-final 2 winner	Game 1	Game 2	Game 3	Game 4	Game 5
Eastern (Hong Kong)	3–1	Singapore Slingers	76–92	92–84	76–72	82–80 (2OT)	—

== Final rankings ==
Pos	Team	Pld	W	L	PF	PA	PD	PCT	Qualification or relegation
1	Eastern	26	21	5	2336	2091	+245	.808	
2	Singapore Slingers	26	16	10	2079	1939	+140	.615	Qualification to FIBA Asia Champions Cup (Note: Eastern and Kaohsiung Truth cannot qualify to the Champions Cup via the ABL.)
3	Alab Pilipinas	22	11	11	1722	1727	−5	.500	
4	Saigon Heat	22	8	14	1733	1876	−143	.364	
5	Westports Malaysia Dragons	20	7	13	1684	1743	−59	.350	
6	Kaohsiung Truth	20	5	15	1614	1792	−178	.250	

Updated to match(es) played on 2017-04-16. Source: ASEANBasketballLeague.com

== Awards ==
2016–17 ABL champions
Eastern
(1st title)

The awarding ceremony was held before the game 4 of the ABL finals on April 23, 2017 held at the OCBC Arena in Kallang, Singapore.

- ABL Local MVP: Bobby Ray Parks Jr. (Alab Pilipinas)
- ASEAN Heritage MVP: Tyler Lamb (Eastern)
- World Import MVP: Marcus Elliott (Eastern)
- Defensive Player of the Year: Justin Howard (Singapore Slingers)
- Coach of the Year: Edu Torres (Eastern)
