= Marcus Elliott =

American basketball player (born 1984)

Macau Giant Pandas
- Title: Head coach
- League: PBA

Personal information
- Born: April 24, 1984 (age 42) San Bernardino County, California
- Listed height: 6 ft 3 in (1.91 m)
- Listed weight: 200 lb (91 kg)

Career information
- High school: Fort Walton Beach (Fort Walton Beach, Florida)
- College: Northwest Florida State (2003–2005); Louisiana Tech (2005–2007)
- NBA draft: 2007: undrafted
- Playing career: 2008–2024
- Position: Shooting guard / point guard
- Coaching career: 2026–present

Career history

Playing
- 2008–2009: CD Valdivia
- 2009–2010: Club Social y Deportivo Anastasia
- 2010: Panteras de Miranda
- 2010–2011: Club Deportivo Libertad
- 2011: Club Deportivo Mavort
- 2011–2012: Club Deportivo Liceo Mixto
- 2012: Club Atlético Welcome
- 2012: Guaiqueríes de Margarita
- 2012–2013: Club Atlético Olimpia
- 2013: Garra Cañera de Navolato
- 2013–2014: Ángeles Guerreros de Acapulco
- 2014: La Unión de Formosa
- 2014: Toros de Aragua
- 2014–2015: Huracanes de Tampico
- 2015: Club Trouville
- 2016: San Lorenzo
- 2016–2019: Hong Kong Eastern
- 2019–2020: Singapore Slingers
- 2020: Hebraica Macabi
- 2021: Urunday Universitario
- 2021–2022: Gimnasia y Esgrima de Comodoro Rivadavia
- 2022–2023: Urunday Universitario
- 2024: Hi-Tech

Coaching
- 2026–present: Macau Black Knights / Giant Pandas

Career highlights
- Liga Ecuatoriana de Baloncesto champion (2011); Liga Nacional de Básquet champion (2016); ABL champion (2017); Hong Kong A1 champion (2018); ABL Finals MVP (2017); ABL World Import MVP (2017); Hong Kong A1 MVP (2018)

Marcus Ryan Elliott (born April 24, 1984) is an American professional basketball former player and coach who currently serves as head coach of Macau Giant Pandas of the Philippine Basketball Association (PBA). As a player, he last played for the Hi-Tech of the Basketball Champions League Asia.

== College career ==
Elliott had played two years of junior college basketball at Okaloosa-Walton CC in NJCAA Division I. He then transferred to Louisiana Tech University, where he played 61 games in two seasons with the Bulldogs in NCAA Division I competition. Elliott graduated from Louisiana Tech in 2007.

== Professional career ==
After being a year of construction worker, Elliott began his professional career in a Chilean Liga Nacional de Básquetbol de Chile club CD Valdivia in September 2008. He signed with Liga Uruguaya de Básquetbol club Club Social y Deportivo Anastasia in September 2009. He moved to the Liga Profesional de Baloncesto club Panteras de Miranda for a short period in April 2010 before joining the Argentinian La Liga Argentina de Básquet club Club Deportivo Libertad. After 5 months in Argentina, he moved to Ecuadorian Liga Ecuatoriana de Baloncesto club Club Deportivo Mavort, where he finished out the season and helped the team win the 2010–11 Liga Ecuatoriana de Baloncesto championship. Elliott returned to Chile in October 2011 to play for Liga Nacional de Básquetbol de Chile club Club Deportivo Liceo Mixto. He returned to Uruguay in February to join Club Atlético Welcome before signing with Guaiqueríes de Margarita in April. He then played with Club Atlético Olimpia between October 2012 and April 2013 before moving to Mexico to play for Garra Cañera de Navolato. and Ángeles Guerreros de Acapulco.

Elliott returned to Argentina in March 2014 and signed for La Unión de Formosa but left the following month for Toros de Aragua. After just five months, he returned to Mexico to join the Mexican club Huracanes de Tampico, where he stayed for a year before returning to Uruguay to play for Club Trouville. In February 2016, Elliott signed with San Lorenzo Argentina and helped the team to win the champion of 2015–16 Liga Nacional de Básquet. He left South America altogether in November 2016 to join the ASEAN Basketball League and Hong Kong A1 Division Championship club Hong Kong Eastern, where he was part of the ABL 2017 and Hong Kong A1 2018 season winning team. He signed with Singapore Slingers in November 2016.
