= 2019 ABL finals =

Championship series of the ASEAN Basketball League's 2018–19 season

Team	Coach	Wins
BTN CLS Knights Indonesia	Brian Rowsom	3
Singapore Slingers	Neo Beng Siang	2
- Dates: 3 May – 15 May 2019
- MVP: Maxie Esho (CLS Knights Indonesia)

The 2019 ASEAN Basketball League (ABL) finals was the best-of-5 championship series of the 2018–19 ABL season and the conclusion of the season's playoffs. BTN CLS Knights Indonesia and Singapore Slingers competed for the 9th championship contested by the league. After a decider game 5, CLS Knights Indonesia eventually clinched the club's first franchise championship in its history, and the second ABL Championship that came from Indonesia. Maxie Esho was named as the Finals MVP.

== Background ==
BTN CLS Knights Indonesia		Singapore Slingers
Finished 15–11 (.577) for 4th place	Regular season	Finished 16–10 (.615) for 3rd place
Def. 5th-seeded Saigon Heat, 2–1	Quarterfinals	Def. 6th-seeded Macau Black Bears, 2–1
Def. 8th-seeded Mono Vampire, 2–1	Semifinals	Def. 7th-seeded Eastern, 2–0

=== Head-to-head matchups ===
Regular-season series
Tied 2–2 in regular season series

20 January 2019
7:00 p.m.

Box score

BTN CLS Knights Indonesia	89–74	Singapore Slingers
Scoring by quarter: 22–15, 17–13, 26–16, 24–30
Pts: Esho 21; Rebs: Esho, Watkins 11; Asts: Herring 5		Pts: Alexander, Fields 22; Rebs: Fields 13; Asts: Alexander 5

GOR Basket Kertajaya, Surabaya, Indonesia
Referees: Reynante Hufana (PHI), Ho Ming Chan (HKG), Sheng-Hsuan Wei (TPE)

3 February 2019
4:00 p.m.

Box score

Singapore Slingers	95–76	BTN CLS Knights Indonesia
Scoring by quarter: 22–20, 30–12, 25–23, 18–21
Pts: Young 36; Rebs: Young 14; Asts: Alexander 12		Pts: Esho 20; Rebs: Esho 13; Asts: Herring 6

OCBC Arena, Singapore
Attendance: 1200
Referees: Owe Shiong Chan (MAS), Yong Sern Tee (MAS), Reynante Hufana (PHI)

27 February 2019
4:00 p.m.

Box score

BTN CLS Knights Indonesia	68–71	Singapore Slingers
Scoring by quarter: 19–16, 18–17, 17–20, 14–18
Pts: Jawato 18; Rebs: Watkins 11; Asts: Herring 7		Pts: Fields 25; Rebs: Fields 18; Asts: Alexander 8

GOR Basket Kertajaya, Surabaya, Indonesia
Referees: Ceciline Michael Vino (IND), Yong Sern Tee (MAS), Wei Chuen Chuo (MAS)

10 March 2019
4:00 p.m.

Box score

Singapore Slingers	95–99 (OT)	BTN CLS Knights Indonesia
Scoring by quarter: 19–23, 20–24, 25–27, 24–14, Overtime: 7–11
Pts: Young 41; Rebs: Alexander 11; Asts: Alexander 6		Pts: Herring 36; Rebs: Herring 11; Asts: Herring 7

OCBC Arena, Singapore
Attendance: 1000
Referees: Michael Tolentino (PHI), Yong Sern Tee (MAS), Owe Shiong Chan (MAS)

This is the first playoff and finals meeting between BTN CLS Knights Indonesia and Singapore Slingers.

== Series summary ==
Game	Date	Venue	Home team	Result	Away team
Game 1	Monday, 3 May	OCBC Arena	Singapore Slingers	67-86 (0-1)	BTN CLS Knights Indonesia
Game 2	Wednesday, 5 May	OCBC Arena	Singapore Slingers	77-57 (1-1)	BTN CLS Knights Indonesia
Game 3	Saturday, 8 May	GOR Basket Kertajaya	BTN CLS Knights Indonesia	60-63 (1-2)	Singapore Slingers
Game 4	Tuesday, 11 May	GOR Basket Kertajaya	BTN CLS Knights Indonesia	87-74 (2-2)	Singapore Slingers
Game 5	Saturday, 15 May	OCBC Arena	Singapore Slingers	81-84 (2-3)	BTN CLS Knights Indonesia

== Game summaries ==
All times local; UTC+7 for Indonesia, and UTC+8 for Singapore.

=== Game 1 ===
3 May	Singapore Slingers	67–86 (Series: 0–1)	BTN CLS Knights Indonesia	OCBC Arena, Singapore
8:00 p.m.	Scoring by quarter: 16–20, 21–18, 13–25, 17–23
	Pts: Alexander, Fields 19; Rebs: Fields 13; Asts: Alexander 7	Box score	Pts: Esho 24; Rebs: Watkins 12; Asts: Herring 6	Attendance: 3000; Referees: Yong Sern Tee (MAS), Michael Tolentino (PHI), Yuji Higashi (JPN)

=== Game 2 ===
5 May 2019	Singapore Slingers	77–57 (Series: 1–1)	BTN CLS Knights Indonesia	OCBC Arena, Singapore
4:00 p.m.	Scoring by quarter: 21–9, 19–21, 17–16, 20–11
	Pts: Alexander 16; Rebs: Fields 12; Asts: Alexander 9	Box score	Pts: Herring 18; Rebs: Esho, Watkins 7 Asts: Herring 5	Attendance: 3000; Referees: Owe Shiong Chan (MAS), Michael Tolentino (PHI), Ceciline Michael Vino (IND)

=== Game 3 ===
8 May 2019	BTN CLS Knights Indonesia	60–63 (Series: 2–1)	Singapore Slingers	GOR Basket Kertajaya, Surabaya, Indonesia
7:00 p.m.	Scoring by quarter: 17–16, 10–12, 20–19, 13–16
	Pts: Esho 19; Rebs: Esho 13; Asts: Herring 7	Box score	Pts: Fields, Young 16; Rebs: Fields 14; Asts: Alexander 8	Referees: Ricor Buaron (PHI), Wei Chuen Chuo (MAS), Nattapong JONTAPA (THA)

=== Game 4 ===
11 May 2019	BTN CLS Knights Indonesia	87–74 (Series: 2–2)	Singapore Slingers	GOR Basket Kertajaya, Surabaya, Indonesia
7:30 p.m.	Scoring by quarter: 21–18, 25–16, 24–20, 17–20
	Pts: Watkins 28; Rebs: Watkins 16; Asts: Herring 6	Box score	Pts: Alexander 25; Rebs: Fields 10; Asts: Alexander 5	Referees: Gi Rok Shin (KOR), Suebpong Wichaiphin (THA), Reynante HUFANA (PHI)

=== Game 5 ===
15 May 2019	Singapore Slingers	81–84 (Series: 2–3)	BTN CLS Knights Indonesia	OCBC Arena, Singapore
8:00 p.m.	Scoring by quarter: 27–23, 17–17, 21–18, 16–26
	Pts: Alexander 23; Rebs: Alexander 12; Asts: Alexander 10	Box score	Pts: Esho 25; Rebs: Watkins 11; Asts: Herring 7	Attendance: 3,800; Referees: Kwok Shun Andy Cheung (HKG), Lu Yueh Chang (TPE), Wei Chuen Chuo (MAS)

== Rosters ==
=== Singapore Slingers ===
Singapore Slingers roster
Players
Coaches

Pos.	No.	Nat.	Name	Ht.	Wt.	Age
PG	1	(Singapore)	Lim, Jun Yuan	1.73 m (5 ft 8 in)	75 kg (165 lb)
SG	2	(Singapore)	Oh, Desmond	1.73 m (5 ft 8 in)	83 kg (183 lb)
F/C	5	(United States)	Fields, John (WI)	2.08 m (6 ft 10 in)	91 kg (201 lb)
G/F	6	(Singapore)	Tay, Ding Loon	1.83 m (6 ft 0 in)	83 kg (183 lb)
G	11	(Singapore)	Liew, Larry	1.91 m (6 ft 3 in)	83 kg (183 lb)
SG	12	(United States)	Young, Jerran (WI)	1.99 m (6 ft 6 in)	86 kg (190 lb)
F	15	(United States)	Alexander, Xavier (WI)	1.96 m (6 ft 5 in)	95 kg (209 lb)
G/F	17	(Singapore)	Han Bin, Ng	1.94 m (6 ft 4 in)	86 kg (190 lb)
F	22	(Singapore)	Lim, Kelvin	1.91 m (6 ft 3 in)	84 kg (185 lb)
F	23	(Singapore)	Goh, Delvin	2.01 m (6 ft 7 in)	101 kg (223 lb)
F	32	(Singapore)	Low, Russel	1.96 m (6 ft 5 in)	105 kg (231 lb)
F/C	55	(Singapore)	Raj, V Lavin	2.01 m (6 ft 7 in)	116 kg (256 lb)

Head coach

- (Singapore) Neo Beng Siang

Assistant coach(es)

- (Australia) Michael Johnson

Legend

- (C) Team captain
- (WI) World import
- Injured

- Roster

=== BTN CLS Knights Indonesia ===
BTN CLS Knights Indonesia roster
Players
Coaches

Pos.	No.	Nat.	Name	Ht.	Wt.	Age
G/F	1	(United States)	Herring Jr., Doug (WI)	1.91 m (6 ft 3 in)	91 kg (201 lb)
G/F	3	(United States) (Indonesia)	Jawato, Brandon	1.93 m (6 ft 4 in)	98 kg (216 lb)
PG	5	(Singapore) (Indonesia)	Wong, Wei Long	1.75 m (5 ft 9 in)	77 kg (170 lb)
CG	8	(Indonesia)	Wisnu, Ngurah	1.80 m (5 ft 11 in)	74 kg (163 lb)
G/F	9	(Indonesia)	Kurniawan, Sandy	1.90 m (6 ft 3 in)	67 kg (148 lb)
PT/F	10	(Indonesia)	Utomo, Rachmad Febri	1.90 m (6 ft 3 in)	84 kg (185 lb)
PG	11	(Indonesia)	Hidayat, Arif	1.77 m (5 ft 10 in)	70 kg (154 lb)
C	13	(United States)	Watkins, Darryl (WI)	2.13 m (7 ft 0 in)	117 kg (258 lb)
PG	15	(Indonesia)	Panagan, Jan Misael	1.79 m (5 ft 10 in)	78 kg (172 lb)
C	16	(Indonesia)	Nugroho, Firman Dwi	2.00 m (6 ft 7 in)	102 kg (225 lb)
G/F	17	(Indonesia)	Baskoro, Katon Adjie	1.84 m (6 ft 0 in)	84 kg (185 lb)
PF/C	18	(United States)	Esho, Maxie (WI)	2.07 m (6 ft 9 in)	93 kg (205 lb)
C	24	(Indonesia)	Saroni, Moh	1.99 m (6 ft 6 in)	102 kg (225 lb)
PG	27	(Indonesia)	Ardiansyah, Bima Riski	1.82 m (6 ft 0 in)	81 kg (179 lb)

Head coach

- (United States) Brian Rowsom

Assistant coach(es)

- (Indonesia) Koko Nugroho
- (Indonesia) Ricky Tauri

Legend

- (C) Team captain
- (WI) World import
- Injured
