= 2018–19 Saigon Heat season =

- Head coach: Kyle Julius
- Owner(s): XLE Group
- Arena: CIS Arena

results
- Record: 13–12 (.520)
- Place: 6th
- Stats @ ABL

Saigon Heat seasons

The 2018–19 Saigon Heat season is the team's 7th season in the ASEAN Basketball League (ABL).

== Roster ==
Note: Flags indicate national team eligibility at FIBA-sanctioned events. Players may hold other non-FIBA nationalities not displayed.

Saigon Heat roster
Players
Coaches

Pos.	No.	Nat.	Name	Ht.	Wt.
PG	1	(United States)	Hughes, Trevon (injured) (WI)	1.83 m (6 ft 0 in)	88 kg (194 lb)
PG	2	(United States) (Vietnam)	Nguyen, Henry	1.75 m (5 ft 9 in)	70 kg (154 lb)
C	7	(Vietnam)	Huỳnh Phú Vinh, Nguyễn	2.03 m (6 ft 8 in)	90 kg (198 lb)
G	8	(United States) (Vietnam)	Tran, Khoa	1.83 m (6 ft 0 in)	78 kg (172 lb)
SG	11	(United States) (Vietnam)	Đinh, Sang	1.85 m (6 ft 1 in)	68 kg (150 lb)
F	12	(United States) (Vietnam)	Young, Justin	1.93 m (6 ft 4 in)	95 kg (209 lb)
F	13	(Canada)	Burnatowski, Murphy (WI)	2.01 m (6 ft 7 in)	104 kg (229 lb)
F/C	17	(United States)	Hamilton, DeAngelo (WI)	2.03 m (6 ft 8 in)	105 kg (231 lb)
F	20	(United States) (Vietnam)	Dierker, Chris	2.00 m (6 ft 7 in)	100 kg (220 lb)
SG	22	(United States) (Vietnam)	Cillia, Corey	1.77 m (5 ft 10 in)	77 kg (170 lb)
SF	23	(United States) (Vietnam)	Đinh, Tam	1.91 m (6 ft 3 in)	82 kg (181 lb)
SG	26	(Vietnam)	Kim Bản, Võ	1.85 m (6 ft 1 in)	80 kg (176 lb)
C	33	(United States)	Barone, Kyle (WI)	2.08 m (6 ft 10 in)	100 kg (220 lb)
F/C	34	(Vietnam)	Waale, Tim	1.93 m (6 ft 4 in)	100 kg (220 lb)

Head coach

- (Canada) Kyle Julius

Assistant coach(es)

- (United States) David Singleton
- (Vietnam) Phan Thanh Cảnh

Athletic trainer(s)

Legend

- (C) Team captain
- (WI) World import
- (AI) ASEAN heritage import
- Injured

- Roster
Updated: 15 December 2018

== Standings ==
Pos	Team	W	L	PCT	GB	Qualification
1	(Chinese Taipei) Formosa Dreamers	19	7	.731	—	Playoffs
2	(Philippines) Alab Pilipinas	18	8	.692	1	Playoffs
3	Singapore Slingers	16	10	.615	3	Playoffs
4	CLS Knights Indonesia	15	11	.577	4	Playoffs
5	(Vietnam) Saigon Heat	14	12	.538 (Note: Head-to-head record: Macau 1–1 Saigon; head-to-head differential: Saigon +1, Macau –1.)	5	Playoffs
6	Macau Black Bears	14	12	.538	5	Playoffs
7	(Hong Kong) Eastern	13	13	.500	6	Playoffs
8	(Thailand) Mono Vampire	11	15	.423	8	Playoffs
9	Westports Malaysia Dragons	8	18	.308	11	
10	(China) Wolf Warriors	2	24	.077	17	

Source: ABL
