= 2018–19 ABL season =

- League: ASEAN Basketball League
- Sport: Basketball
- Duration: Regular season: 16 November 2018 – 24 March 2019; Playoffs: 29 March – 15 May 2019
- Games: 150 (130 regular season, 20 playoffs)
- Teams: 10
- TV partner(s): (Hong Kong) Cable TV (Indonesia) Vidio (Philippines) ABS-CBN Sports and Action (Singapore) StarHub (Thailand) MONO29 (Taiwan) Eleven Sports Network (Vietnam) FPT Group

Regular season
- Top seed: Formosa Dreamers
- Season MVP: Local: Bobby Ray Parks Jr. (Alab); World import: Xavier Alexander (Slingers)

ABL finals
- Champions: CLS Knights Indonesia
- Runners-up: Singapore Slingers
- Finals MVP: Maxie Esho

Seasons
- ← 2017–18 2019–20 →

The 2018–19 ABL season was the ninth season of competition of the ASEAN Basketball League. The regular season started on 16 November 2018 and ended on 28 March 2019.

== Teams ==
All the teams in 2017–18 season returned for this season. However, the following changes happened:

1. Chong Son Kung Fu relocated and rebranded to Macau Black Bears.
2. Zhuhai Wolf Warriors was the 10th team in the ABL, added after Kung Fu relocated to Macau.

=== Venues ===
Locations of ABL teams.
Locations of ABL teams in the Pearl River Delta.
Locations of ABL arenas in Metro Manila.

Team	City / Region	Arena	Capacity
CLS Knights Indonesia	Surabaya, East Java	GOR Kertajaya Surabaya	3,000
(Chinese Taipei) Formosa Dreamers	Changhua, Changhua County	Changhua Stadium	8,000
(Hong Kong) Eastern	Wan Chai, Hong Kong	Southorn Stadium	2,000
Macau Black Bears	Foshan, Guangdong	Foshan International Sports and Cultural Center	14,700
Macau Black Bears	Taipa, Macau	University of Macau Sports Complex	
(Thailand) Mono Vampire	Bangkok Metropolitan Region	Stadium 29, Nonthaburi	5,000
(Vietnam) Saigon Heat	Ho Chi Minh City	Canadian International School Vietnam Arena	2,500
(Philippines) Alab Pilipinas	Santa Rosa, Laguna	City of Santa Rosa Multi-Purpose Complex	5,700
(Philippines) Alab Pilipinas	Metro Manila	Filoil Flying V Centre, San Juan	5,500
(Philippines) Alab Pilipinas	Metro Manila	Caloocan Sports Complex, Caloocan	3,000
(Philippines) Alab Pilipinas	Lapu-Lapu City	Hoops Dome	6,000
(Philippines) Alab Pilipinas	Lapu-Lapu City	Lapu-Lapu Sports Complex	
Singapore Slingers	Singapore	OCBC Arena, Kallang	3,000
Westports Malaysia Dragons	Kuala Lumpur	MABA Stadium	2,500
(China) Wolf Warriors	Zhuhai, Guangdong	Doumen Gymnasium,	
(China) Wolf Warriors	Zhuhai, Guangdong	Zhuhai Jinan University,	
(China) Wolf Warriors	Macau	Foshan Shishan Gymnasium	
(China) Wolf Warriors	Macau	University of Macau Sports Complex	

=== Personnel ===
Team	Head coach
CLS Knights Indonesia	(United States) Brian Rowsom
(Chinese Taipei) Formosa Dreamers	(United States) Dean Murray
(Hong Kong) Eastern	(Spain) Edu Torres
Macau Black Bears	(China) Mu Jianxin
(Thailand) Mono Vampire	(Thailand) Tongkiat Singhasene
(Vietnam) Saigon Heat	(Canada) Kyle Julius
(Philippines) Alab Pilipinas	(Philippines) Jimmy Alapag
Singapore Slingers	(Singapore) Neo Beng Siang
Westports Malaysia Dragons	(Australia) Jamie Pearlman
(China) Wolf Warriors	(United States) Matt Skillman

=== Imports ===
The following is the list of imports, which had played for their respective teams at least once. Each team can register 3 imports. Flags indicate the citizenship/s the player holds.

Club	Import 1	Import 2	Import 3	Former Imports
CLS Knights Indonesia	(United States) Maxie Esho	(United States) Doug Herring Jr.	(United States) Darryl Watkins	(United States) Montay Brandon (United States) Stephen Hurt
(Chinese Taipei) Formosa Dreamers	(United States) Malcolm Miller	(United States) William Artino	(United States) Tevin Glass	
(Hong Kong) Eastern	(United States) Marcus Elliott	(United States) Michael Holyfield	(United States) O'Darien Bassett	(United States) Trey Gilder (United States) Eric Ferguson (Malta) (Italy) Samuel Deguara
Macau Black Bears	(United States) Dewarick Spencer	(United States) Ryan Watkins	(United States) (Philippines) Mikh McKinney	(United States) Anthony Tucker
(Thailand) Mono Vampire	(United States) Mike Singletary	(United States) Malcolm White	(United States) (North Macedonia) Romeo Travis	(United States) (Germany) Marcus Keene (United States) Chris Charles (United States) (Philippines) Jason Brickman
(Vietnam) Saigon Heat	(United States) Kyle Barone	(United States) Trevon Hughes	(United States) DeAngelo Hamilton	(Canada) Murphy Burnatowski
(Philippines) Alab Pilipinas	(United States) (Puerto Rico) Renaldo Balkman	(Puerto Rico) Peter John Ramos		
Singapore Slingers	(United States) Xavier Alexander	(United States) John Fields	(United States) Jerran Young	
Westports Malaysia Dragons	(United States) Chris Eversley	(United States) Winston Shepard	(United States) (Nigeria) Nnanna Egwu	(United States) Sundiata Gaines (Australia) Shaun Bruce
(China) Wolf Warriors	(United States) Mike Bell	(United States) Cory Bradford	(United States) Shawntez Patterson	(United States) DeShawn Mitchell (United States) (Indonesia) Mario Wuysang (United States) Eric Tisby (United States) Eddy Curry (United States) Mike Taylor

=== Local heritage ===
(China) Wolf Warriors	(Vietnam) Saigon Heat	(Philippines) Alab Pilipinas	Macau Black Bears	(Thailand) Mono Vampire
(Hong Kong) Tse Sit Chun	(United States) Corey Cillia (United States) Chris Dierker (United States) Trần Đăng Khoa (United States) Justin Young (United States) Henry Nguyen (United States) Sang Đinh (Sweden) Stefan Nguyen (Denmark) Tim Alan Van Waale	(United States) Bobby Ray Parks Jr. (United States) Josh Urbiztondo (United States) Lawrence Domingo (United States) Caelan Tiongson (United States) Brandon Rosser (United States) Ethan Alvano	(United States) (China) Kane Ma (Canada) (Hong Kong) Nathan Yu (China) Derek King (China) Liu Zankun (China) Luo Yongxuan (Canada) (Hong Kong) Jenning Leung	(United States) Freddie Goldstein (United States) Tyler Lamb (United States) Moses Morgan
CLS Knights Indonesia	Westports Malaysia Dragons	(Chinese Taipei) Formosa Dreamers	(Hong Kong) Eastern	Singapore Slingers
(United States) Brandon Jawato (Singapore) Wei Long Wong	(Singapore) Jonathan Wong Zhong Han	(United States) Kenneth Chien		

== Regular season ==
Each team will play 26 games throughout the season, 13 at home and 13 away. Each team will play the remaining 4 teams in their group, twice each at home and away. Each team will also play the 5 teams from the other group, once each at home and away. The groupings are as follows:

- Bears, Warriors, Eastern, Dreamers, Alab
- Knights, Slingers, Dragons, Vampire, Heat

=== Standings ===
Pos	Team	W	L	PCT	GB	Qualification
1	(Chinese Taipei) Formosa Dreamers	19	7	.731	—	Playoffs
2	(Philippines) Alab Pilipinas	18	8	.692	1	Playoffs
3	Singapore Slingers	16	10	.615	3	Playoffs
4	CLS Knights Indonesia	15	11	.577	4	Playoffs
5	(Vietnam) Saigon Heat	14	12	.538 (Note: Head-to-head record: Macau 1–1 Saigon; head-to-head differential: Saigon +1, Macau –1.)	5	Playoffs
6	Macau Black Bears	14	12	.538	5	Playoffs
7	(Hong Kong) Eastern	13	13	.500	6	Playoffs
8	(Thailand) Mono Vampire	11	15	.423	8	Playoffs
9	Westports Malaysia Dragons	8	18	.308	11	
10	(China) Wolf Warriors	2	24	.077	17	

Source: ABL

=== Results ===
Home \ Away	CLS	FMD	HKE	MBB	MNV	SGH	SAP	SGS	WMD	WOW	CLS	FMD	HKE	MBB	MNV	SGH	SAP	SGS	WMD	WOW
CLS	—	99–73	87–78	105–78	80–75	64–76	80–88*	89–74	73–70	132–104	—				109–102*	91–90		68–71	73–62	
Formosa	82–72	—	81–71	99–89	71–66	72–74	73–72	80–88	82–76	107–79		—	109–101	94–84			79–71			97–78
Eastern	97–98	80–82	—	95–114	95–88	95–88	81–96	88–81	79–70	95–88		86–92	—	111–109			88–83			101–70
Macau	117–110	116–110	90–114	—	102–107	97–95	116–103	70–89	87–62	107–81		116–122	113–93	—			114–84			99–65
Mono	82–110	89–74	86–79	100–106	—	83–98	59–78	81–91	86–94	113–92	92–76				—	89–83*		87–84	98–79	
Saigon	82–80	85–86*	99–91	96–93	87–76	—	81–80	75–78	65–60	102–70	79–81				101–82	—		81–69	78–65	
Alab	94–67	86–72	87–75	106–99	110–100*	111–87	—	77–71	85–47	105–95		74–88	88–76	101–96			—			108–81
Singapore	95–76	73–77	89–92**	98–88	79–81	87–80	70–80	—	101–47	99–77	95–99*				100–88	76–70		—	81–44	
Malaysia	68–83	97–96	78–89	86–97	75–84	84–82	72–71	76–87	—	89–83	89–84				87–91	80–76		73–88	—	
Wolf Warriors	96–88	81–107	75–107	96–135	119–114	86–105	81–100	103–107*	73–74	—		88–99	76–88	81–89			79–105			—

Source: ASEANBasketballLeague.com
Legend: Blue = home team win; Red = away team win.
Matches with lighter background shading were decided after overtime.

== Playoffs ==
=== Bracket ===
Quarterfinals
1 (Chinese Taipei) Formosa Dreamers	0
8 (Thailand) Mono Vampire	2
4 CLS Knights Indonesia	2
5 (Vietnam) Saigon Heat	1
2 (Philippines) Alab Pilipinas	0
7 (Hong Kong) Eastern	2
3 Singapore Slingers	2
6 Macau Black Bears	1

Semifinals
8 (Thailand) Mono Vampire	1
4 CLS Knights Indonesia	2
7 (Hong Kong) Eastern	0
3 Singapore Slingers	2

Finals
4 CLS Knights Indonesia	3
3 Singapore Slingers	2

=== Quarterfinals ===
The quarterfinals was a best-of-three series, with the higher seeded team hosting game 1, and if necessary game 3.

Team 1	Series	Team 2	Game 1	Game 2	Game 3
Formosa Dreamers (Chinese Taipei)	0–2	(Thailand) Mono Vampire	80–83	68–70	—
San Miguel Alab Pilipinas (Philippines)	0–2	(Hong Kong) Eastern	88–90	84–102	—
Singapore Slingers	2–1	Macau Black Bears	102–91	78–80	81–79
BTN CLS Knights Indonesia	2–1	(Vietnam) Saigon Heat	84–59	81–86	68–56

=== Semifinals ===
The semifinals was a best-of-three series, with the higher seeded team hosting game 1, and if necessary game 3.

Team 1	Series	Team 2	Game 1	Game 2	Game 3
Singapore Slingers	2–0	(Hong Kong) Eastern	101–70	80–73	—
BTN CLS Knights Indonesia	2–1	(Thailand) Mono Vampire	86–77	71–79	89–75

=== Finals ===
The finals is a best-of-five series, with the higher seeded team hosting Game 1, 2, and 5, if necessary.

Team 1	Series	Team 2	Game 1	Game 2	Game 3	Game 4	Game 5
Singapore Slingers	2–3	BTN CLS Knights Indonesia	67–86	77–57	63–60	74–87	81–84

== Awards ==
=== End-of-season awards ===
The winners were announced before game 2 of the 2019 ABL finals at the OCBC Arena, Singapore.

- Most Valuable Players:
  - Local: Bobby Ray Parks Jr. (San Miguel Alab Pilipinas)
  - World Import: Xavier Alexander (Singapore Slingers)
- Defensive Player of the Year: John Fields (Singapore Slingers)
- Coach of the Year: Dean Murray (Formosa Dreamers)

=== Players of the Week ===
Week	Player	Club	Ref
Week 1	(United States) Eric Ferguson	(Hong Kong) Eastern	
Week 2	(United States) Xavier Alexander	Singapore Slingers	
Week 3	(United States) Mikh McKinney	Macau Black Bears	
Week 4	(Singapore) Larry Liew	Singapore Slingers	
Week 5	(Puerto Rico) Renaldo Balkman	(Philippines) San Miguel Alab Pilipinas	
Week 6	(China) Cai Chen	(China) Wolf Warriors	
Week 7	(Hong Kong) Lee Ki	(Hong Kong) Eastern	
Week 8	(United States) Maxie Esho	CLS Knights Indonesia	
Week 9	(Singapore) (Indonesia) Wei Long Wong	CLS Knights Indonesia	
Week 10	(Puerto Rico) Peter John Ramos	(Philippines) San Miguel Alab Pilipinas	
Week 11	(United States) O'Darien Bassett	(Hong Kong) Eastern	
Week 12	(United States) Mike Singletary	(Thailand) Mono Vampire	
Week 13	(United States) (Philippines) Bobby Ray Parks Jr.	(Philippines) San Miguel Alab Pilipinas	
Week 14	(United States) John Fields	Singapore Slingers	
Week 15	(United States) Malcolm Miller	(Chinese Taipei) Formosa Dreamers	
Week 16	(United States) Doug Herring Jr.	CLS Knights Indonesia	
Week 17	(United States) Dewarick Spencer	Macau Black Bears	
Week 18	(United States) Xavier Alexander	Singapore Slingers	
