= Mike Taylor (basketball player) =

American basketball player (born 1986)

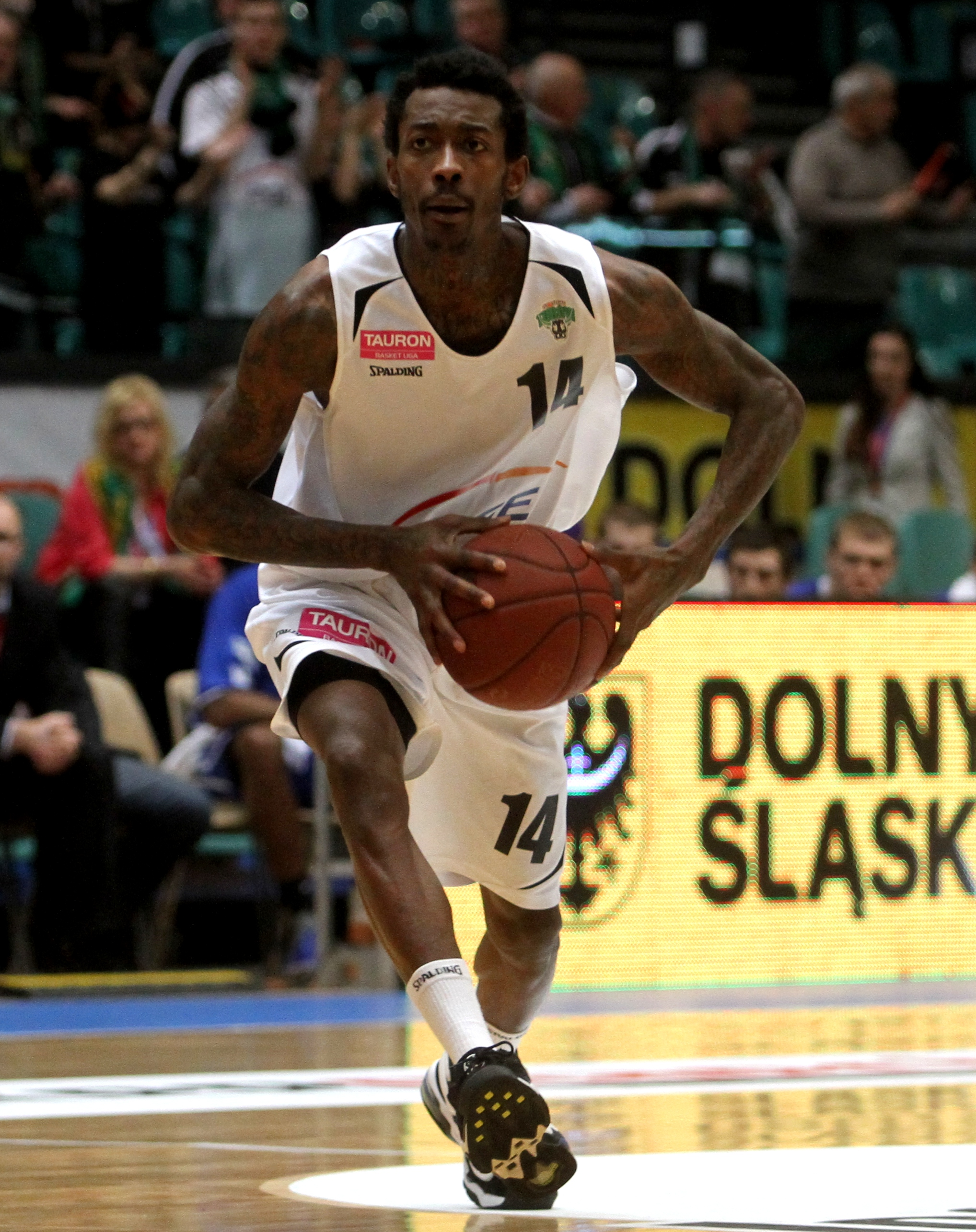
- Taylor with Turów Zgorzelec in 2014

Personal information
- Born: January 21, 1986 (age 40) Chicago, Illinois, U.S.
- Listed height: 6 ft 1 in (1.85 m)
- Listed weight: 188 lb (85 kg)

Career information
- High school: John Marshall (Milwaukee, Wisconsin)
- College: Chipola College (2004–2006); Iowa State (2006–2007)
- NBA draft: 2008: 2nd round, 55th overall pick
- Drafted by: Portland Trail Blazers
- Playing career: 2007–2020
- Position: Point guard
- Number: 4

Career history
- 2007–2008: Idaho Stampede
- 2008–2009: Los Angeles Clippers
- 2009–2010: Crvena zvezda
- 2011: Iowa Energy
- 2011: Tezenis Verona
- 2011–2012: Kavala
- 2012–2013: Nymburk
- 2013: Los Angeles D-Fenders
- 2014: Turów Zgorzelec
- 2014: Yeşilgiresun Belediye
- 2015: Rosa Radom
- 2015–2016: Al Mouttahed Tripoli
- 2016: Al-Gharafa
- 2017: Anyang KGC
- 2019: Zhuhai Wolf Warriors
- 2019: Al-Nasr Benghazi
- 2020: Zamalek

Career highlights
- Korean Basketball League champion (2017); Czech League champion (2013); NBA D-League champion (2008)
- Stats at NBA.com
- Stats at Basketball Reference

Michael Rene Taylor (born January 21, 1986) is an American former professional basketball player. He played college basketball for Chipola College and Iowa State. Taylor started his professional career with the Idaho Stampede of the NBA Development League during the 2007–08 season. He was selected by the Portland Trail Blazers as the 55th overall pick in the 2008 NBA draft and became the first player in National Basketball Association (NBA) history to be drafted after playing in the NBA D-League. Taylor was traded to the Los Angeles Clippers and spent the 2008–09 season with them. He also played overseas in China, the Czech Republic, Greece, Italy, Lebanon, Poland, Qatar, Serbia, South Korea and Turkey.

== College basketball ==
Collegiately, Taylor played three seasons for Chipola College (NJCAA-FCCAA, 2004–2005 to 2005–2006) and Iowa State University (2006–07), leading the latter team in scoring with 16.0 points per game. However, he was dismissed from the team in July 2007 after a series of brushes with the law.

== Professional career ==
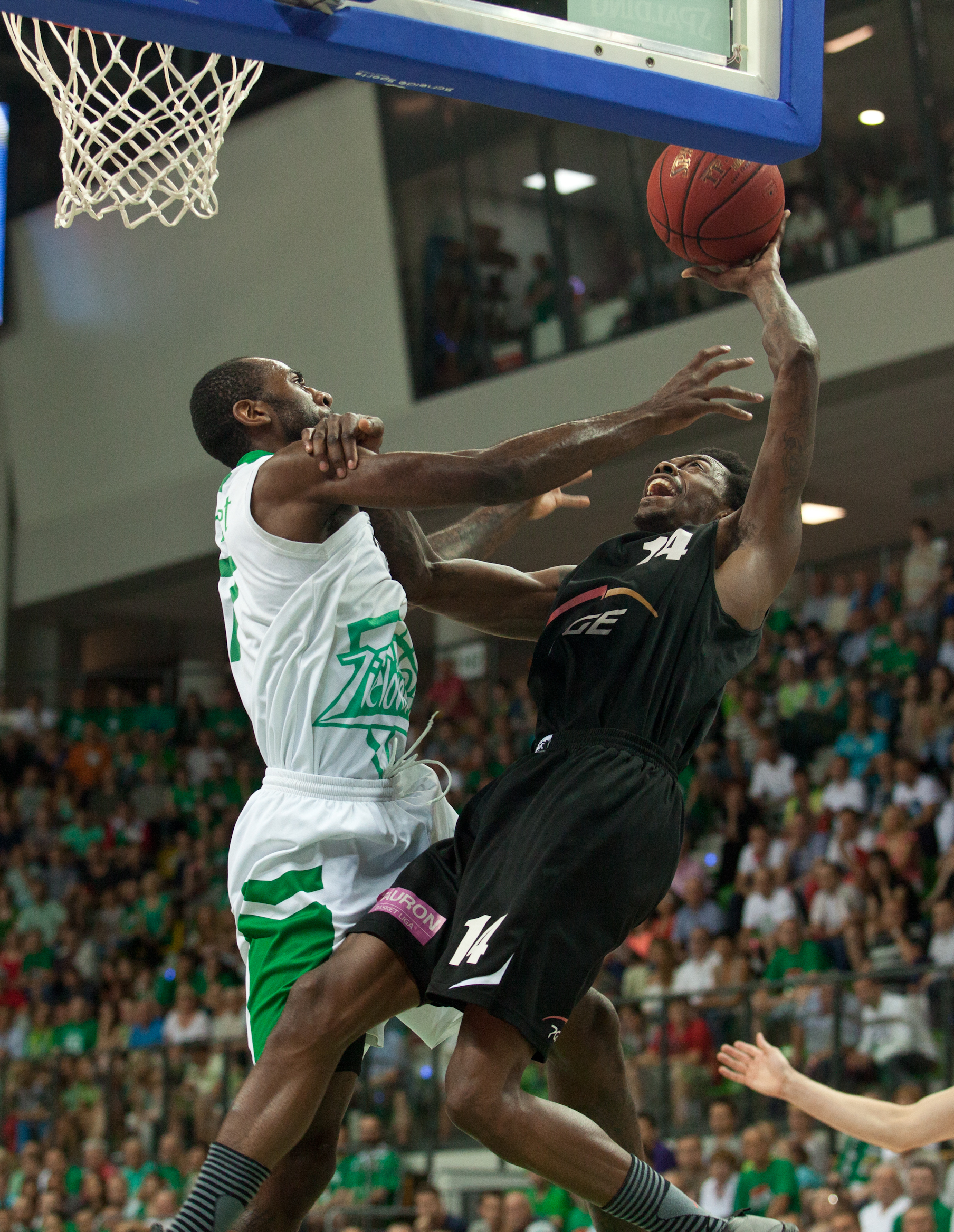
Taylor tries to score against Christian Eyenga during a 2014 game

=== NBA ===
During 2007–08, he played for the Idaho Stampede of the NBA Development League, averaging 14.5 points per game in 39 games. He scored 27 points in the championship game to help the Stampede become NBA D-League champions in 2008.

Taylor was drafted 55th overall in the 2008 NBA draft by the Portland Trail Blazers, becoming the first player in NBA history to be drafted out of the D-League. Portland acquired the 55th pick, used to select Taylor, from the Phoenix Suns trade via the Indiana Pacers. However, he was traded to the Los Angeles Clippers on draft night in exchange for a future second-round draft pick, and signed with the team on July 15. On March 25, 2009, he scored an NBA career high 35 points at Madison Square Garden versus the New York Knicks. The Los Angeles Clippers waived Taylor on July 31, 2009.

=== Europe ===
Taylor signed a contract until the end of the 2009–2010 season with Serbian Crvena zvezda on November 20, 2009. He was brought to serve as a replacement for Maurice Bailey, who was released. Following the injury in the last team's Eurocup game of the season, on March 13, 2012, Taylor and Red Star Belgrade reached an agreement to part ways, mainly due to the financial problems the club was facing.

After playing with the Iowa Energy, he signed with the Italian team Tezenis Verona. He averaged 7,3 points and 4 rebounds over 4 games in the Italian League. In September 2011, he signed a one-year contract with Kavala. He averaged 13.9 points, 3.8 rebounds and 2 assists over 22 games in the Greek championship for them.

On July 9, 2012, Taylor signed with Nymburk for one season. Nymburk's head coach was very excited with the new arrival and he said: "Mike is a young, talented player.. an excellent point guard, but can also play shooting guard.. a great defender and a very good athlete." He left Nymburk in January 2013.

=== Return to America ===
On January 30, 2013, Taylor was acquired by the Los Angeles D-Fenders.

=== BAL ===
In October 2019, Taylor played with Al-Nasr Benghazi from Libya in the 2020 BAL Qualifying Tournaments. In February 2020, Taylor signed with Zamalek of Egypt to play in the BAL and the remainder of the 2019–20 Super League.

== NBA career statistics ==
Legend
GP	Games played	GS	Games started	MPG	Minutes per game
FG%	Field goal percentage	3P%	3-point field goal percentage	FT%	Free throw percentage
RPG	Rebounds per game	APG	Assists per game	SPG	Steals per game
BPG	Blocks per game	PPG	Points per game	**Bold**	Career high

=== Regular season ===
Year	Team	GP	GS	MPG	FG%	3P%	FT%	RPG	APG	SPG	BPG	PPG
2008–09	L.A. Clippers	51	5	15.1	.412	.325	.691	1.7	2.1	.7	.0	5.7
Career		51	5	15.1	.412	.325	.691	1.7	2.1	.7	.0	5.7
