= Eddy Curry =

American basketball player (born 1982)

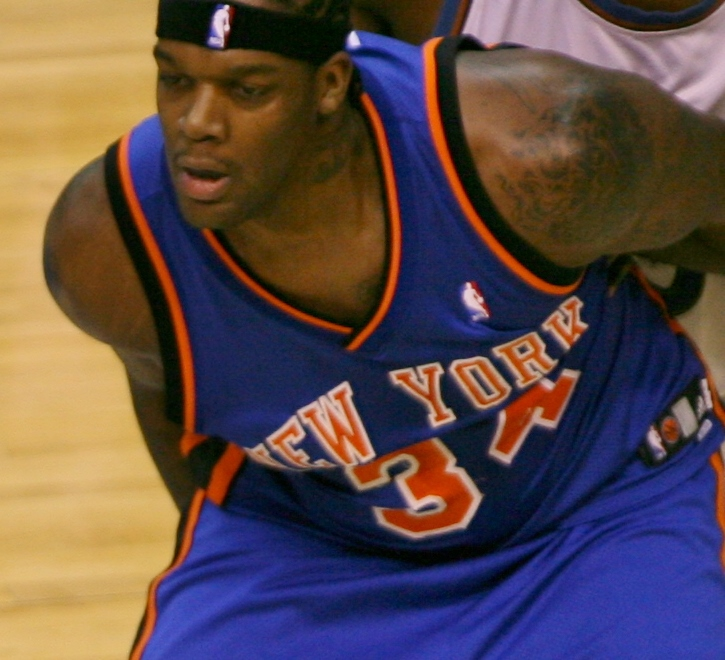
- Curry with the New York Knicks in 2007

Personal information
- Born: December 5, 1982 (age 43) Harvey, Illinois, U.S.
- Listed height: 7 ft 0 in (2.13 m)
- Listed weight: 295 lb (134 kg)

Career information
- High school: Thornwood (South Holland, Illinois)
- NBA draft: 2001: 1st round, 4th overall pick
- Drafted by: Chicago Bulls
- Playing career: 2001–2013, 2018–2019
- Position: Center
- Number: 2, 34, 52, 6

Career history
- 2001–2005: Chicago Bulls
- 2005–2011: New York Knicks
- 2011–2012: Miami Heat
- 2012: Dallas Mavericks
- 2012–2013: Zhejiang Golden Bulls
- 2018–2019: Zhuhai Wolf Warriors

Career highlights
- NBA champion (2012); McDonald's All-American MVP (2001); First-team Parade All-American (2001); Second-team Parade All-American (2000); Illinois Mr. Basketball (2001)

Career statistics
- Points: 6,820 (12.9 ppg)
- Rebounds: 2,725 (5.2 rpg)
- Blocks: 384 (0.7 bpg)
- Stats at NBA.com
- Stats at Basketball Reference

Eddy Anthony Curry Jr. (born December 5, 1982) is an American former professional basketball player. A 7 ft 0 in (2.13 m) center, he came directly out of Thornwood High School in South Holland, Illinois, and was selected fourth overall in the 2001 NBA draft by the Chicago Bulls. Curry played for the Bulls until 2005, then played for the New York Knicks from 2005 to 2010. He played for the Miami Heat in the 2011–12 season and was part of the Heat's 2012 championship team. He played for the Dallas Mavericks for the early part of the 2012–13 season before playing out the season for the Zhejiang Golden Bulls of the Chinese Basketball Association.

== High school career ==
Prior to becoming considered one of the best high school basketball players in the nation as a senior at Thornwood High School in South Holland, Illinois, Curry aspired to be a gymnast and did not pick up basketball until the seventh grade when he reluctantly went out for the school team. In 2001, Curry led his team to second place in the IHSA State Playoffs. For his efforts, Curry was named 2001 Illinois Mr. Basketball. In his senior year of high school he posted averages of 22 points per game, 9 rebounds and 6 blocks. He was named to the 1998, 1999 and 2000 State Farm Holiday Classic all-tournament teams, and in 2003 was named by the fans to the tournament's All-Quarter Century Team.

In 2001, Eddy Curry and four other high school basketball stars, were the subject of the documentary "Preps: Chicago Hoops", a series about making the jump to college or the NBA.

== Professional career ==
=== Chicago Bulls (2001–2005) ===
Curry had signed a letter of intent to play at DePaul University but declared himself eligible for the 2001 NBA draft in which the Chicago Bulls made him the fourth overall pick.

Curry's contribution was limited during his rookie year due to limited minutes. Curry improved in his second year, leading the NBA in field goal percentage (58.5%) and becoming the first Bull to lead the league in a major statistical category since Michael Jordan in 1998. In the 2004–05 season the Bulls improved by 28 wins and made the playoffs as the 22-year-old Curry led the team in scoring before being hospitalized with an irregular heartbeat. This caused him to miss the last 13 games of the regular season and the entire playoffs. On June 24, 2005, heart specialists cleared Curry to resume practice.

=== New York Knicks (2005–2011) ===
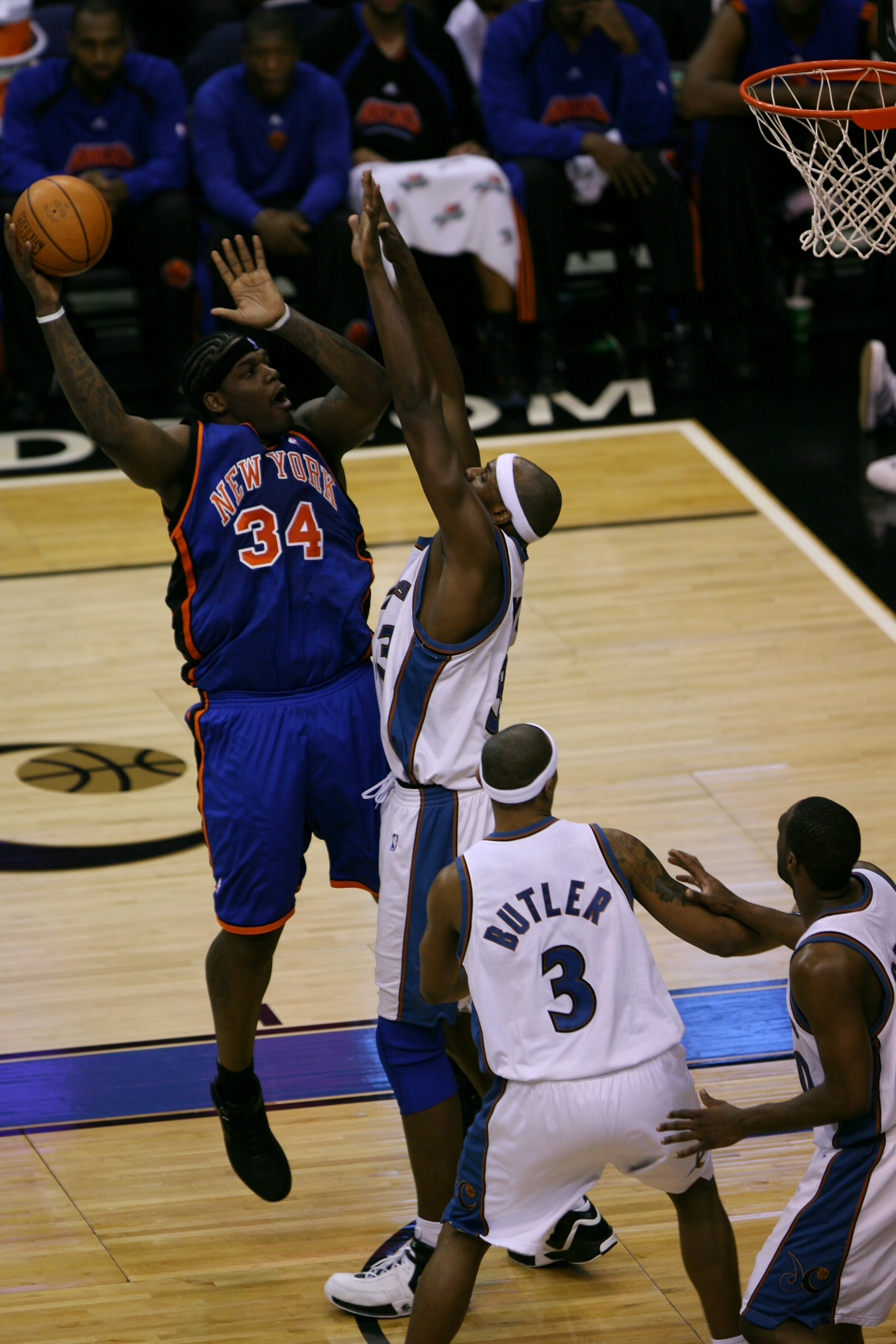
Curry attempts a shot in a January 2007 game against the Washington Wizards.

On October 3, 2005, after refusing on privacy grounds to submit to a DNA test, as requested by Bulls management, to assess whether he has a congenital heart condition, Curry was traded to the New York Knicks. The trade included the Bulls' Antonio Davis, as well as the Knicks' Mike Sweetney, Tim Thomas, and Jermaine Jackson. First-round draft picks were also exchanged in the trade—which later came back to haunt the Knicks as they had a poor 2005–06 season in which Curry averaged 13.6 points and 6.0 rebounds per game (numbers that were significantly down from the previous season). Curry's inability to defend and rebound was a source of frustration for former coaches Scott Skiles and Larry Brown. When asked by a reporter in 2003 what Curry needed to do to become a better rebounder, Skiles simply replied: "Jump." The 2006–07 season saw a resurgence in Curry's performance under new coach Isiah Thomas, with Curry anointed the team's primary offensive option, averaging career highs in points (19.6), rebounds (7.1), and minutes (34.9) per game. On April 7, 2007, Curry scored a career-best 43 points in an overtime win over the Milwaukee Bucks; his first three-pointer of the season forcing the game into the extra period. Curry is 2 for 2 (100%) from three-point range in his NBA career. In the 2007–2008 season, Curry was expected to form a great frontcourt with Zach Randolph, however both of them saw a regression in their games. Curry showed up to training camp in October 2008 out of shape for the second year in a row, incensing new head coach Mike D'Antoni. Curry not only lost his starting job, but was not even in D'Antoni's rotation at the beginning of the 2008–2009 season. Curry was also bothered by a sore right knee for much of the season. Curry played his first game of the season on January 8, 2009, against the Dallas Mavericks and played in two other games later in the season. During the 2009 off-season Curry began working with a trainer on a fitness and weight-loss regimen. As of mid-July he had lost 30 pounds, but according to the trainer it would be "delusional" for coaches to think he could get down to his listed weight of 285 pounds.

=== Miami Heat (2011–2012) ===
On February 22, 2011, Curry was traded to the Minnesota Timberwolves in a three-way blockbuster deal which also involved Denver Nuggets that brought Carmelo Anthony to New York. On March 1, 2011, his contract was bought out by the Timberwolves before he played a single game for them, making him a free agent.

On December 10, 2011, Curry signed a one-year contract with the Miami Heat. On January 19, 2012, a noticeably-slimmer Curry played in the NBA for the first time since 2009, against the Los Angeles Lakers. He had lost nearly 70 pounds since he last played in the NBA, and scored six points in six minutes in his return to the NBA. As a part of the Heat's 2011–2012 championship team, Curry played 83 minutes in 14 games (starting one), and was active for (but did not play in) one game during the playoffs.

=== Dallas Mavericks (2012) ===
In October 2012, Curry signed with the San Antonio Spurs. However, he did not make the team's final roster.

Curry was claimed off waivers by the Dallas Mavericks on October 25, 2012. He played two games for Dallas before being waived to make room for Troy Murphy, as the Mavericks wanted a power forward with outside shooting ability instead of a traditional center. The second game that Curry played for Dallas on October 31, 2012, ended up being his final NBA game ever. In his final game, Curry and the Mavericks would lose to the Utah Jazz 94 - 113 with Curry recording 2 points and no other stats in 8 minutes of play.

=== Zhejiang Golden Bulls (2012–2013) ===
On December 6, 2012, Curry signed with the Zhejiang Golden Bulls in China, replacing Josh Boone. Curry played in 29 games and averaged 23.0 points, 10.1 rebounds, and 0.9 assists per game. Curry played his last game with Zhejiang on February 27, 2013, as he missed the last two playoff games due to gastroenteritis.

=== Zhuhai Wolf Warriors (2018–2019) ===
Curry signed with the Zhuhai Wolf Warriors of the ASEAN Basketball League (ABL) in 2018, and played for the team in the 2018–19 ABL season. He was released by the Wolf Warriors on January 20, 2019.

== Personal life ==
Curry is married and has seven children, one from a previous marriage (Eddy III), and four with his current wife Patrice Curry, who starred on VH1's Basketball Wives LA franchise. Curry's other two children, Ava and Noah, were with former girlfriend Nova Henry, who was murdered in 2009 along with 10-month-old Ava.

=== Cardiac problems ===
Several prominent cardiologists cleared Curry to play, but Barry Maron, a world-renowned specialist in hypertrophic cardiomyopathy, suggested a DNA test. During the team's media day, Bulls General Manager John Paxson said he understood the privacy issues involved but insisted the Bulls did not have an ulterior motive, that their concern was a situation similar to those of former Boston Celtics guard Reggie Lewis or Loyola Marymount star Hank Gathers—players with hypertrophic cardiomyopathy who collapsed and died—and that the Bulls had offered Curry an annuity of $400,000 per year for 50 years if he took and failed the genetic test. Curry never took the test and ultimately continued his career based on the clearances from other experts.

=== Alleged sexual harassment ===
On January 12, 2009, Curry was sued by his former chauffeur, David Kuchinsky. Kuchinsky accused Curry of trying to solicit sex from him. According to court papers, Curry twice approached Kuchinsky "in the nude," saying, "Look at me, Dave, look" and, "Come and touch it, Dave." Kuchinsky also alleged that Curry called him racial slurs.

Kuchinsky claimed Curry owed him $68,000 in unpaid wages, as well as $25,000 in expenses which Curry never repaid. Those expenses, he said, included cellphones that Curry had him buy as gifts and hotel and club bills. Curry's lawyer, Kelly A. Saindon, called Kuchinsky's claims "preposterous" and "extortion". Federal judge Denise Cote dismissed the lawsuit on May 28, 2009, and sent it to arbitration.

=== Daughter's and ex-girlfriend's murders ===
Curry's ex-girlfriend, Nova Henry, and their ten-month-old daughter Ava Curry were found murdered in Chicago on January 24, 2009. A paternity test proved that Ava was the daughter of Curry and Henry. Their three-year-old son Noah was found unharmed at the scene. Two counts of first degree murder were brought against 36-year-old attorney Frederick Goings on February 22, 2009; Goings had served as Henry's attorney in a custody case against Curry involving Ava, and was allegedly involved in a relationship with Henry. Goings was convicted of all charges against him on February 12, 2013, and was sentenced to life in prison two months later.

=== Foreclosure ===
As of June 2009, Curry's Chicago home was in foreclosure; he owed close to $220,000 in mortgage payments. Curry took out a nearly $4 million mortgage on the property in 2006, which included monthly house payments of more than $25,000. In June 2021, Curry was evicted for violating his lease agreement in Katy, Texas.

== Awards and accomplishments ==
=== High school ===
- USA Today First Team All-American
- PARADE High School Player of the Year
- Earned Illinois Mr. Basketball honors
- MVP of the McDonald's All-American game after scoring 28 points with 8 rebounds and 4 blocked shots in leading the West to a 131–125 victory
- Led Thornwood High School to the Illinois State Championship game, averaging 22.0 points, 9.0 rebounds and 6.0 blocked shots, shooting .640 from the floor, including 25.0 points and 10.0 rebounds in the state tournament. Averaged 24.6 points and 11.2 rebounds, along with 4.8 blocks, as a junior.
- Was selected to the State Farm Holiday Classic all-tournament team in 1998, 1999 and 2000.

=== NBA ===
- NBA field goal percentage leader (2003)
- 2012 NBA champion

== NBA career statistics ==
Legend
GP	Games played	GS	Games started	MPG	Minutes per game
FG%	Field goal percentage	3P%	3-point field goal percentage	FT%	Free throw percentage
RPG	Rebounds per game	APG	Assists per game	SPG	Steals per game
BPG	Blocks per game	PPG	Points per game	**Bold**	Career high
†	Won an NBA championship	*	Led the league

=== Regular season ===
Year	Team	GP	GS	MPG	FG%	3P%	FT%	RPG	APG	SPG	BPG	PPG
2001–02	Chicago	72	31	16.0	.501	.000	.656	3.8	.3	.2	.7	6.7
2002–03	Chicago	**81**	48	19.4	.585*	.000	.624	4.4	.5	.2	.8	10.5
2003–04	Chicago	73	63	29.5	.496	**1.000**	.671	6.2	**.9**	.3	**1.1**	14.7
2004–05	Chicago	63	60	28.7	.538	.000	.720	5.4	.6	.3	.9	16.1
2005–06	New York	72	69	25.9	.563	.000	.632	6.0	.3	**.4**	.8	13.6
2006–07	New York	**81**	**81**	**35.2**	.576	**1.000**	.615	**7.0**	.8	**.4**	.5	**19.5**
2007–08	New York	59	58	25.9	.546	.000	.623	4.7	.5	.2	.5	13.2
2008–09	New York	3	0	4.0	**1.000**	.000	.333	1.3	.0	.0	.0	1.7
2009–10	New York	7	0	8.9	.381	.000	.588	1.9	.0	.0	.1	3.7
2011–12†	Miami	14	1	5.9	.462	.000	**.750**	.9	.1	.0	.1	2.1
2012–13	Dallas	2	0	12.5	.500	.000	.250	2.0	.0	.0	.0	4.5
Career		527	411	24.9	.545	1.000	.642	5.2	.5	.3	.7	12.9

== See also ==
- List of NBA career field goal percentage leaders

Awards and achievements
Preceded by Darius Miles	Illinois Mr. Basketball Award Winner; 2001	Succeeded by Dee Brown
