= Wei Long Wong =

Singaporean professional basketball player

Wong Wei Long 黄伟龙
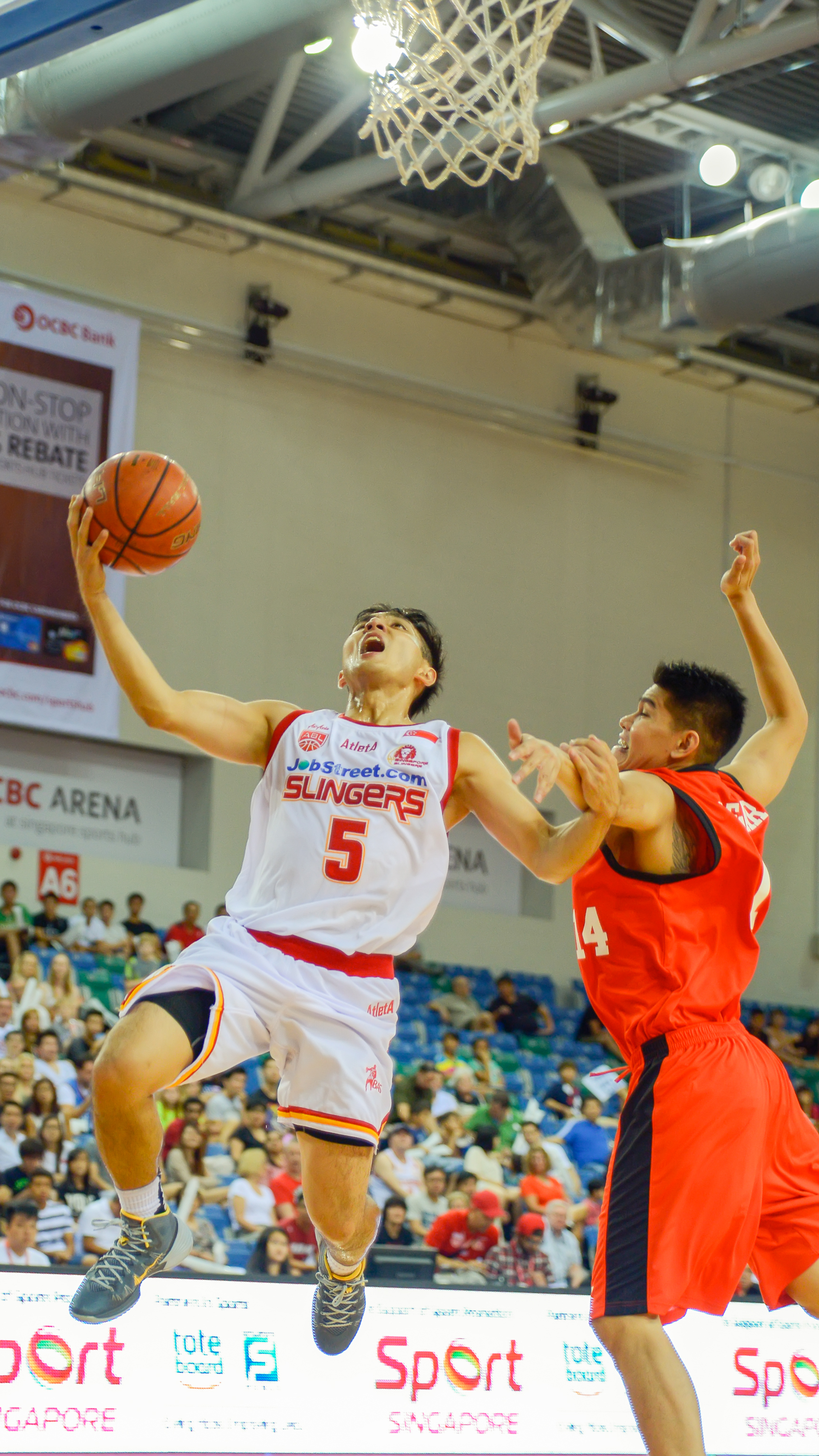
- Wong with the Slingers

No. 5 – Singapore Adroit
- Position: Point guard
- League: NBL Singapore

Personal information
- Born: 18 August 1988 (age 38) Singapore
- Listed height: 5 ft 9 in (1.75 m)
- Listed weight: 171 lb (78 kg)

Career information
- College: Nanyang Technological University
- Playing career: 2009–present

Career history
- 2009–2017: Singapore Slingers
- 2018–2019: CLS Knights Indonesia
- 2023–2025: Singapore Adroit
- 2026–present: Scholar Basketball Academy

Career highlights
- ABL champion (2019); 2× ABL Local MVP (2014, 2016)
Medals
Men's basketball
Representing Singapore
Southeast Asian Games
Bronze medal – third place	2013 Naypyidaw	Team
Bronze medal – third place	2015 Singapore	Team
SEABA Cup
Gold medal – first place	2014 Batam	Team

Wong Wei Long (simplified Chinese: 黄伟龙; traditional Chinese: 黃偉龍; pinyin: huáng wěi lóng, born 18 August 1988 in Singapore) is a Singaporean professional basketball player for the Adroit Club of the National Basketball League (NBL). With his ability to knockdown the three ball at a high percentage, he has earned the nicknames of the Long-ranger and the Singapore Assassin.

== ABL career ==
In 2008, Wei Long had a brief stint with the Singapore Slingers while the team was competing in the 2008/09 Singapore Challenge Series.

In August 2009, Wei Long signed a one-year contract to play for the Singapore Slingers along with 7 other local players. He scored a season high of 14 points, including 4 3-pointers against the Brunei Barracudas on 18 October 2009, the opening night of the inaugural ASEAN Basketball League.

On 29 November 2011, Wei Long, together with Shengyu Lim and Desmond Oh, formed the first trio of Singaporeans that signed new contracts with the Slingers for the 2012 Asean Basketball League season.

For the 2013 season, pursuing a higher education at Nanyang Technological University, Wei Long signed a new contract with the Slingers with a partial commitment, which sees him missing out on most of the teams' away games. Wei Long switched his No 5 jersey to 8. Despite juggling his commitments between his studies and the team, 2013 became Wei Long's most outstanding season yet. He was nominated for the AirAsia player of the month for February, averaging 16.5 points in that month. He was also honoured as one of the three best homegrown talents in the ASEAN region who averaged more than 10 points for their team.

On 31 March, Wei Long scored his career-high of 29 points against the Saigon Heat, the most points ever scored by any local player in the team. This performance topped his previous career-high of 20 points against the same team on 17 February 2013, the Singapore Slingers Cancer Awareness night.

In 2017, after the game against Kaohsiung Truth, Wong scored his 1000th ABL career points.

After sitting out for the 2017–18 ABL season, he officially signed with the CLS Knights Indonesia for the upcoming 2018–19 ABL season. It is believed that he is the first Singaporean to play professional basketball outside of the republic.

== ABL statistics ==
Legend
GP	Games played	GS	Games started	MPG	Minutes per game
FG%	Field goal percentage	3P%	3-point field goal percentage	FT%	Free throw percentage
RPG	Rebounds per game	APG	Assists per game	SPG	Steals per game
BPG	Blocks per game	PPG	Points per game	**Bold**	Career high

Year	Team	GP	GS	MPG	FG%	3P%	FT%	RPG	APG	SPG	BPG	PPG
2009–10	Singapore	16	0	10:20	.302	.351	.429	0.9	0.6	0.25	.0	3.2
2010–11	Singapore	15	0	5:30	.261	.143	.429	.3	.3	.0	.0	1.1
2012	Singapore	21	3	**25:54**	**0.361**	.291	**.827**	1.8	**2.0**	**1.1**	.0	9.1
2013	Singapore	14	1	22:24	.278	**.361**	.818	**2.3**	1.1	.9	**.1**	**11.4**

== International career ==
Wei Long was born in to Indonesian Chinese parents from Batam in Singapore. He is also a member of the men's Singapore national basketball team. In the 2011 SEABA tournament, Wei Long averaged 17.0 points and 4.0 rebounds, and shot a team-high 45.8% from three-point range.

== See also ==
- FIBA Asia Championship
- Singapore national basketball team
- ASEAN Basketball League
- Singapore Slingers
