= University of Surabaya =

University in East Java, Indonesia

- Universitas Surabaya
- Other name: UBAYA
- Former name: Surabaya University of Trisakti (1966–1968)
- Motto: To Be the First University in Heart and Mind
- Type: Private, nonprofit university
- Established: March 11, 1968 (current name)
- Academic affiliations: AUAP
- Rector: Benny Lianto Effendy Sabema
- Undergraduates: 12,500 (2019)
- Postgraduates: 1,400 (2019)
- Location: Rungkut, Surabaya, East Java, Indonesia; 7.31980090°S 112.76811190°E
- Campus: Urban
- Colors: Red and Gold
- Website: www.ubaya.ac.id

University of Surabaya (UBAYA) is a university in Rungkut, Surabaya, East Java, Indonesia. UBAYA is the successor to Trisakti University of Surabaya which was founded in 1966. Its name was changed to the University of Surabaya in 1968. Construction on the campus began on 11 March 1968. The university has three campuses: Ngagel, Tenggilis (both in Surabaya), and Trawas, Mojokerto Regency. Ngagel campus is for diploma program and rectorate building, Rungkut campus is the main campus for undergraduate and postgraduate studies, and Trawas campus is for outdoor learning activities. University of Surabaya was awarded Institutional 'A' Accreditation from the National Accreditation Board for Higher Education (BAN-PT) in 2015 and also noted as one of 50 Promising Indonesian Universities.

== Programs ==
=== Faculty of Pharmacy ===
Undergraduate

- Pharmacy (S.Farm.; Bachelor of Pharmacy)

Professional Education

- Pharmacists (Apt.; Pharmacist)

Postgraduate

- Master of Pharmaceutical Science (M.Farm.; Master of Pharmacy)

=== Faculty of Law ===
Undergraduate

- Law (S.H.; Bachelor of Law)

Postgraduate

- Master of Law (M.H.)
- Master of Notary (M.Kn.)

=== Faculty of Business and Economics ===
Undergraduate

- Economical Science (S.E.; Bachelor of Economics)
  - Banking and Investment
  - International Business
- Management (S.M.; Bachelor of Management)
  - Finance, Investment, and Financial Intermediation
  - Marketing Management
  - Service and Tourism Management
  - Business Network Management
  - Entrepreneurship and Human Resources Empowerment
- Accountancy (S.Ak.; Bachelor of Accountancy)
- International Business Network (Single/Dual Degree, S.M. and B.B.A. if dual)
- Professional Accounting (Single/Dual Degree, S.Ak. and B.Com. if dual)

Professional Education

- Accountants (Ak.; Accountant)

Postgraduate

- Master of Management (M.M.)
- Master of Accounting (M.Ak.)

=== Faculty of Psychology ===
Undergraduate

- Psychology (S.Psi.; Bachelor of Psychology)

Postgraduate

- Master of Scientific Psychology (M.Si.; Master of Science)
- Master of Professional Psychology (M.Psi.; Master of Psychology)

Doctoral

- Psychology (Dr.; Doctor)

=== Faculty of Engineering ===
Undergraduate

- Electrical Engineering (S.T.; Bachelor of Engineering)
- Chemical Engineering (S.T.)
- Industrial Engineering (S.T.)
- Informatics Engineering (S.Kom.; Bachelor of Computer)
- Manufacturing Engineering (S.T.)
- Business Information System (under Informatics Engineering Department) (S.Kom.)
- Multimedia (under Informatics Engineering Department) (S.Kom.)
- Information Technology Dual Degree (under Informatics Engineering Department) (S.Kom., B.I.T.)

Postgraduate

- Master of Industrial Engineering (M.T.; Master of Engineering)

=== Faculty of Biotechnology ===
Undergraduate

- Biotechnology (S.Biotek.; Bachelor of Biotechnology)
- Bionutrition & Food Innovation (S.Biotek.)

Postgraduate

- Master of Biotechnology (M.Biotek.)

=== Faculty of Creative Industry ===
Undergraduate

- Product Design and Management (S.Ds.; Bachelor of Design)
- Lifestyle and Fashion Design (S.Ds.)

=== Faculty of Medicine ===
Undergraduate

- Medicine (S.Ked.; Bachelor of Medicine)

Professional Education

- Medical Doctor (dr.)

=== Polytechnic (Diploma, A.Md.; Intermediary Expert) ===
- Accounting (morning session)
- Computer Accounting (evening session)
- Marketing Management (morning session)
- Professional Selling (evening session)
- Business Administration (morning and evening sessions)
- Secretary (morning session only)
- Business English (morning and evening sessions)
- Taxation (morning session)
- Professional Taxation (evening session)

== Campuses ==
- Ngagel Campus on Ngagel Jaya Selatan Street 169, Surabaya, East Java (rectorate and diploma programs)
- Tenggilis Campus on Raya Kalirungkut Street, Surabaya, East Java (34 acres) (undergraduate, graduate, and doctoral programs)
- Ubaya Training Center (UTC) in Trawas, Mojokerto, East Java (74 acres) (outdoor learning and activities)

== List of rectors ==
#	Name	Faculty origin	Time in office
1	Prof. Mr. Raden Boedisoesetya	Law	1968–1976
2	Prof. Raden Soebijono Tjitrowinoto, S.H.	Law	1976–1994
3	Anton Prijatno, S.H.	Law	1994–2003
4	Prof. Drs.ec. Wibisono Hardjopranoto, M.S.	Business and Economics	2003–2011
5	Prof. Ir. Joniarto Parung, M.MBAT., Ph.D.	Engineering	2011–2019
6	Ir. Benny Lianto Effendy Sabema, M.MBAT.	Engineering/Polytechnic	2019–present

== International Village ==
The International Village is aimed at bringing under one roof the international education and cultural centres operating in Indonesia. It will enable the general public to more easily access their services.

No	Country	Institutions
1	Australia	Australian Education Centre (AEC)
2	Germany	(1) Deutscher Akademischer Austauschdienst (DAAD), German (2) Academic Exchange Service
3	Japan	Study in Japan Information Centre didukung oleh Japan Student Services Organization/JASSO (berupa access point)
4	USA	(1) Educational Advising Service (EAS) dari American-Indonesian Exchange Foundation (AMINEF) (2) American Studies Library (didukung oleh Public Affairs Section Kedutaan Besar Amerika Serikat di Jakarta)
5	Taiwan	Taiwan Education Center (TEC)

== Units and institutions ==
- Center for Research and Community Services (SBRC)
- Center for Environmental Studies (PSL)
- Center for Human Rights Studies (PUSHAM)
- Center for Business and Industrial Studies (CBIS)
- Information Center for Drugs and Pharmaceutical Services (PIOLK)
- Central City Community Empowerment (PUSDAKOTA)
- Centre for Professional Development (CPD)

== UBAYA Men's and Women's Basketball Team ==
- UBAYA men's basketball team
- UBAYA women's basketball team
