= Firman Dwi Nugroho =

Indonesian basketball player

Free agent
- Position: Center

Personal information
- Born: 16 October 1990 (age 36) Purwokerto, Indonesia
- Listed height: 2.02 m (6 ft 8 in)
- Listed weight: 225 lb (102 kg)

Career information
- High school: SMAN 4(Purwokerto, Indonesia)
- College: Satya Wacana Christian University
- Playing career: 2013–present

Career history
- 2013-2016: Satya Wacana Saints
- 2016-2019: CLS Knights
- 2019-2022: Prawira Bandung
- 2022-2024: Dewa United Banten
- 2026: Weathers Surabaya

Career highlights
- ABL champion (2019); IBL Defensive Player of the Year (2016); IBL Most Improved Player of the Year (2016)
Medals
Men's basketball
Representing Indonesia
SEA Games
| Silver medal – second place | 2017 Kuala Lumpur | Team |

Firman Dwi Nugroho (born October 16, 1990) is an Indonesian professional basketball player who last played for Weathers Surabaya.

== National team career ==
Nugroho has represented Indonesia men's national basketball team at several competitions, such as his debut in the 2015 SEABA Championship, and then other competitions such as 2017 SEA Games and 2018 Asian Games.
