= Rungkut =

District in Surabaya City, East Java Province, Indonesia

- District (kecamatan)
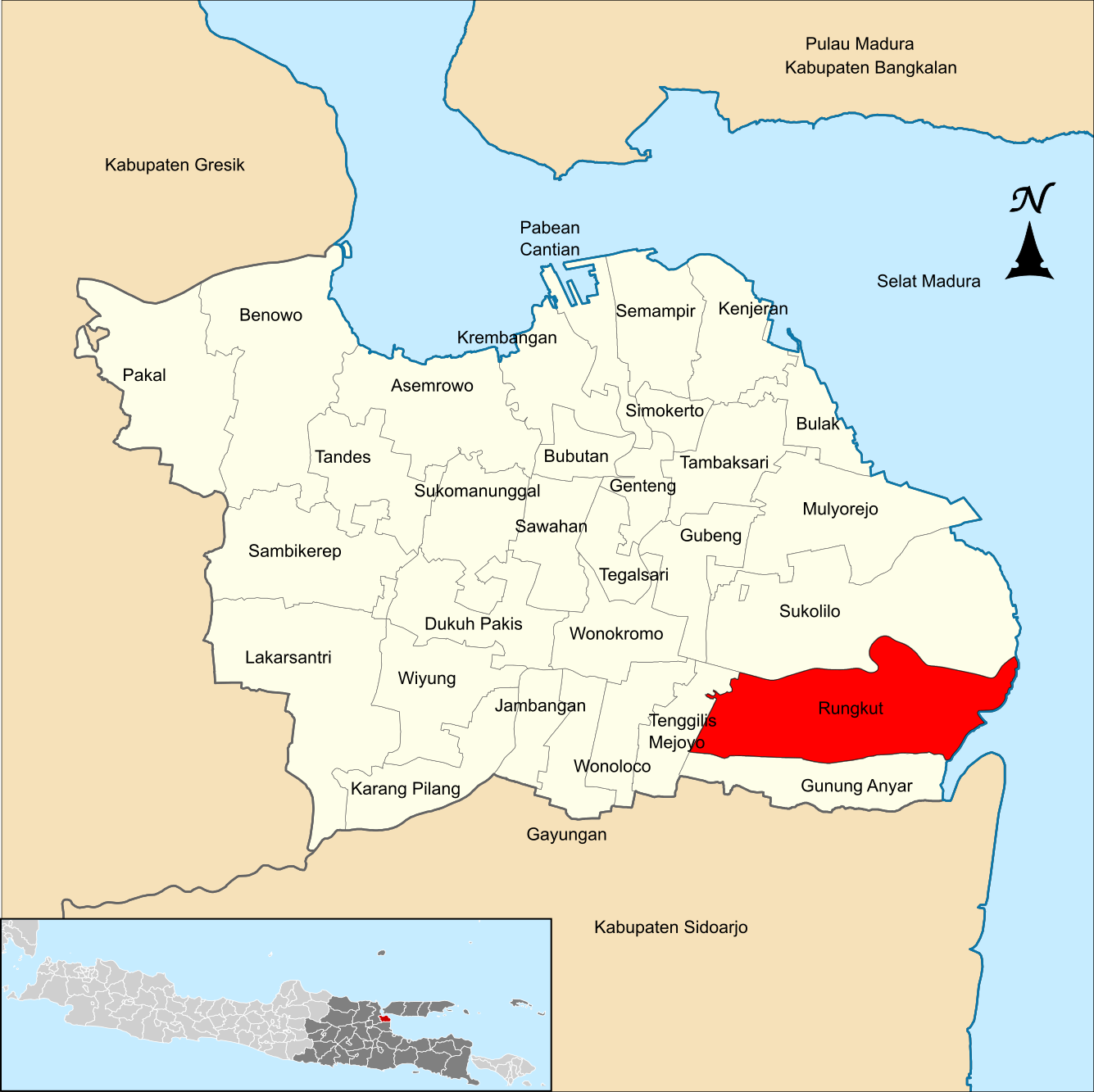
- Location of Rungkut District within Surabaya
- Interactive map of Rungkut
- Country: Indonesia
- Province: East Java
- City: Surabaya
- Urban Villages: 6
- Postal code: 60293

Rungkut (Javanese: ꦫꦸꦁꦏꦸꦠ꧀, romanized: Rungkut, [rʊŋkʊt]) is an administrative district (kecamatan) in the city of Surabaya, in Indonesia's East Java Province. It covers an area of 22.91 km^{2}, and had a population of 123,653 in mid 2024.
