= Doug Herring Jr. =

American basketball player

No. 1 – Venados de Mazatlán
- Position: Guard
- League: CIBACOPA

Personal information
- Born: September 29, 1987 (age 39) Poughkeepsie, New York, U.S.
- Listed height: 6 ft 3 in (1.91 m)
- Listed weight: 200 lb (91 kg)

Career information
- High school: Poughkeepsie (Poughkeepsie, New York)
- College: Utica (2005–2009)
- NBA draft: 2009: undrafted
- Playing career: 2010–present

Career history
- 2010–2013: Hudson Valley Kingz
- 2013–2014: Saint John Mill Rats
- 2014: Rochester Razorsharks
- 2014–2015: Bristol Flyers
- 2015–2016: Saint John Mill Rats
- 2016–2017: Defensor Sporting
- 2017: London Lightning
- 2017: Orchies
- 2017–2018: London Lightning
- 2018: Moncton Magic
- 2019: CLS Knights Indonesia
- 2019–2020: Macau Wolf Warriors
- 2021–2022: Gezira
- 2022–2023: Club La Unión
- 2023: Vancouver Bandits
- 2024–present: Venados de Mazatlán

Career highlights
- ASEAN Basketball League champion (2019); 2× NBL Canada champion (2017, 2018); NBL Canada All-Star (2014); APBL All-Star (2011); All-APBL Second Team (2011); 3× First-team All-E8 (2007–2009); E8 Rookie of the Year (2006)

Douglas Herring Jr. (born September 29, 1987) is an American-born naturalised Syrian professional basketball player for the Venados de Mazatlán of the Circuito de Baloncesto de la Costa del Pacífico (CIBACOPA). He played college basketball for Utica College.

== Collegiate career ==
Herring attended Utica College, where he competed at the NCAA Division III level with the Pioneers for four seasons. On December 12, 2005, he was named Empire 8 (E8) Rookie of the Week, after averaging 13.7 points, 4.7 assists, and 3.0 rebounds and helping his team win three consecutive games. As a junior, he was a nominee for the Bob Cousy Award. In his senior year, Herring led the Pioneers to the semifinals of the E8 tournament and garnered all-league honors. Herring completed his career with Utica as its all-time assists leader, with 451, and second-best scorer, with 1,587 points.

== Professional career ==
Following college, Herring signed with the Hudson Valley Kingz of the Atlantic Coast Professional Basketball League (ACPBL). In his career with the Kingz, he averaged 31.0 points per game. He set a single-game league record with a career-high 66 points against the Manhattan Pride on February 10, 2013. In turn, he was named Player of the Month. On March 2, 2013, Herring broke another league record by putting up 20 assists vs the North Jersey Pros. In the summer of 2013, he notched 53 points at the prestigious Greater Hartford Pro–am. His performance drew the attention of Ian McCarthy, general manager of the Saint John Mill Rats of the National Basketball League of Canada (NBL).

On August 20, 2013, Herring signed a professional contract with the Mill Rats. McCarthy said, "Doug is an undiscovered talent who has the rare combination of being a devastating scorer but he also makes the right basketball plays." Through 42 games, Herring averaged 17.6 points, 5.1 rebounds, 5.2 assists, and 1.7 steals and shot .426 from the three-point line. He was named an NBL Canada All-Star for the Atlantic Division. Following the season, Herring signed with the Rochester Razorsharks of the Premier Basketball League (PBL), playing four games and averaging 9.8 points, 1.8 rebounds, 2.8 assists, and lifting them to the 2014 PBL championship.

On July 24, 2014, Herring signed with the Bristol Flyers of the British Basketball League (BBL). He was expected by head coach Andreas Kapoulas to be an asset to the team's back court. On October 14, he was named to the BBL Team of the Week after scoring 26 points. In 11 games, he averaged 17.7 points, 4.0 rebounds, 4.1 assists, and 1.8 steals. The Flyers made it to the semifinals of the BBL Cup. However, he suffered a season-ending injury with a meniscal tear.

On October 19, 2015, Herring returned to the Mill Rats. Head coach Rob Spon commented, "Doug is an excellent two-way player in this league with great size for a guard."

On December 2, 2016, Herring signed with Defensor Sporting of the Liga Uruguaya de Basketball (LUB), the top league in Uruguay. He said, "I am very thankful and appreciative of Defensor Sporting for the opportunity to join the club."

On January 20, 2017, Herring returned to the NBL Canada with the London Lightning. Prior to the season, the Lightning had acquired rights to Herring from the Windsor Express in exchange for Warren Ward. The signing came after Garrett Williamson suffered a hamstring injury, putting him on the injury reserve. Herring was named to the Third Team All-NBLC.

On January 4, 2019, it was announced that Herring will be joining the CLS Knights of the ABL replacing Montay Brandon as CLS starting Guard

In September 2021, Herring Jr. signed with Gezira of the Egyptian Basketball Super League.

On June 30, 2023, Herring signed with the Vancouver Bandits of the Canadian Elite Basketball League.

Herring signed with the Venados de Mazatlán of the Circuito de Baloncesto de la Costa del Pacífico (CIBACOPA) ahead of the 2024 CIBACOPA season.

== National team career ==
In 2021, Herring became a naturalised Syrian citizen. He later made his debut for the Syria national basketball team in the qualifiers for the 2021 FIBA Asia Cup.
