= Brian Rowsom =

American basketball player (born 1965)

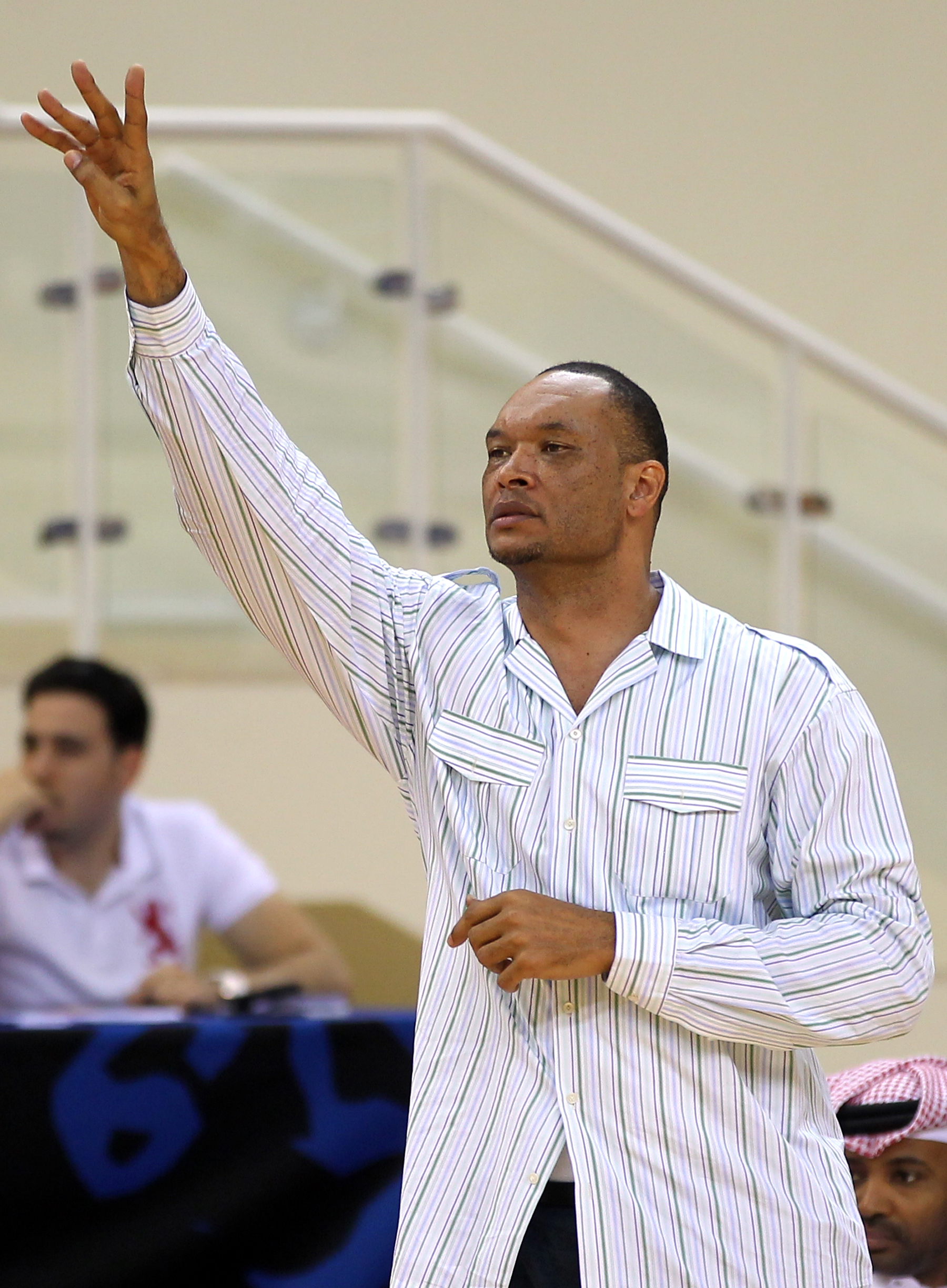
- Rowsom coaching Al Rayyan in 2012.

Personal information
- Born: October 23, 1965 (age 61) Newark, New Jersey, U.S.
- Listed height: 6 ft 9 in (2.06 m)
- Listed weight: 220 lb (100 kg)

Career information
- High school: Columbia (Columbia, North Carolina)
- College: UNC Wilmington (1983–1987)
- NBA draft: 1987: 2nd round, 34th overall pick
- Drafted by: Indiana Pacers
- Playing career: 1987–1998
- Position: Power forward
- Number: 24, 32
- Coaching career: 2004–present

Career history

Playing
- 1987: Indiana Pacers
- 1987–1988: Pau Orthez
- 1988–1990: Charlotte Hornets
- 1990–1991: SLUC Nancy Basket
- 1991–1995: Hapoel Eilat
- 1995–1998: Toshiba Red Thunders
- 1998–1999: Manchester Giants

Coaching
- 2004: Guelph Gladiators
- 2004–2005: Carolina Thunder
- 2005–2006: Charlotte Krunk (manager)
- 2006: Brevard Blue Ducks
- 2009–2010: Oita Heat Devils
- 2010–2011: Al Ahli Sports Club
- 2011–2014: Al Rayyan Doha
- 2014–2016: Toshiba Brave Thunders Kanagawa (assistant)
- 2016–2017: Al Muharraq
- 2018: Hochiminh City Wings
- 2018–2019: CLS Knights Indonesia
- 2019: San-en NeoPhoenix
- 2022–2024: Lebanon Leprechauns
- 2024–2025: Little Rock Lightning
- 2025–2026: RANS Simba Bogor

Career highlights
- As player: 2× First-team All-CAA (1986, 1987); As coach: Asean Basketball League champion (2019)
- Stats at NBA.com
- Stats at Basketball Reference

Brian Rowsom (born October 23, 1965) is an American basketball coach and former player, who was selected by the Indiana Pacers in the second round (34th pick overall) of the 1987 NBA draft. He is currently the coach of Indonesian Basketball League (IBL) club RANS Simba Bogor.

A 6' 10" power forward from the University of North Carolina at Wilmington, Rowsom played in 3 NBA seasons from 1987 to 1990. He played for the Pacers and Charlotte Hornets. In his NBA career, Rowsom played in 82 games and scored a total of 457 points.

After his NBA career, Rowsom played in Israel for Hapoel Eilat (1991/92–1994/95)

Post-retirement, Rowsom became a basketball coach. He coached the Toshiba Brave Thunders of the Japanese NBL. He was the head coach for the Hochiminh City Wings. On July 20, 2018, he was changed to team counselor.

== Career playing statistics ==
Legend
GP	Games played	GS	Games started	MPG	Minutes per game
FG%	Field goal percentage	3P%	3-point field goal percentage	FT%	Free throw percentage
RPG	Rebounds per game	APG	Assists per game	SPG	Steals per game
BPG	Blocks per game	PPG	Points per game	**Bold**	Career high

=== NBA ===
==== Regular season ====
Year	Team	GP	GS	MPG	FG%	3P%	FT%	RPG	APG	SPG	BPG	PPG
1987–88	Indiana	4	0	4.0	.000	–	**1.000**	1.3	.3	.3	.0	1.5
1988–89	Charlotte	34	0	**15.2**	**.494**	**1.000**	.802	**4.0**	**.7**	.3	**.4**	**6.6**
1989–90	Charlotte	**44**	**2**	12.7	.436	.500	.819	3.0	.5	**.4**	.3	5.1
Career		82	2	13.3	.455	.667	.818	3.3	.6	.4	.3	5.6

== Head coaching record ==
Legend
Regular season	G	Games coached	W	Games won	L	Games lost	W–L %	Win–loss %
Playoffs	PG	Playoff games	PW	Playoff wins	PL	Playoff losses	PW–L %	Playoff win–loss %

Team	Year	G	W	L	W–L%	Finish	PG	PW	PL	PW–L%	Result
Oita Heat Devils	2009-10	52	25	27	.481	5th in Western	-	-	-	–	-
Hochiminh City Wings	2018	15	1	14	.067	6th	-	-	-	–	-
San-en NeoPhoenix	2019-20	10	0	10	.000	Fired	-	-	-	–	-
