= CLS Knights Indonesia =

- Leagues: IBL/NBL; 2003–2017; ABL; 2017–2019; TBSL; 2020; Malaysia D-League; 2022; ASEAN Super League; 2022
- Founded: 1946
- History: CLS Knights Surabaya (2008–2017); CLS Knights Indonesia (2017–2019); BTN CLS Knights Indonesia (2019–present)
- Arena: GOR Kertajaya Surabaya
- Location: Surabaya, Indonesia
- Team colors: Purple, Yellow, White, Black
- Main sponsor: Bank BTN
- Team manager: Christoper Tanuwidjaja
- Head coach: Brian Rowsom
- Championships: IBL: 1 (2016); ABL: 1 (2018–19)
- Website: clsknights.com

BTN CLS Knights Indonesia is a basketball club based in Surabaya, East Java, Indonesia that formerly played in the ASEAN Basketball League (ABL) and the Indonesian Basketball League (IBL). Their home games are played at GOR Kertajaya Surabaya.

They dissolved in 2019 to focus on developing their youth team and academy, which consists of under-18 players. In 2022, CLS joined Malaysia's Basketball Development League under the name BBM Vikings Warriors with their under-22 players.

== History ==
=== Indonesian Basketball League (IBL) ===
==== First years (2003–2011) ====
CLS Knights first competed in the Indonesian Basketball League in 2003. They never won an IBL title from their inaugural season until 2010 when the league changed their name to National Basketball League (NBL). During the league's first season which is the NBL in 2010-11, the Knights reached the league finals for the first time, but losing to the eventual champions, Satria Muda BritAma.

==== Dimaz Muharri era (2011–2013) ====
Dimaz is a huge change for the CLS Knights Surabaya. Although he has never won the NBL in his career, Dimaz had garnered individual awards such as being the player with the Top Steal and Assist. The Knights' best finish with Dimaz on their team was 3rd place.

==== "Big 2 Point Guards" (2013–2015) ====
CLS brought in Mario Wuysang who played with the Indonesia national basketball team as their point guard. Wuysang was reportedly the NBL player with the highest salary. Wuysang was paired with Dimaz. In 2015, the league reverted to its old name.

==== Jamarr Johnson, local dominance, and exit (2015–2017) ====
Five of them were brought CLS in the heyday by winning the IBL Indonesia for the first time. Jamarr came to Indonesia in 2014 and began playing in 2015. Not only that Sandy and Mario are Indonesian national team players in the event of the 2015 SEA Games, furthermore Thoyib return from retirement to make the CLS more intense. Febri which is a player in the Indonesian 2013 SEA Games also made great contributions. Johnson was recognized as the Most Valuable Player, Rookie of the Year, Top Scorer Awards in the IBL while Wuysang was recognized as the player with the Most Assists.

However, just after the 2017 IBL Indonesia season, the Knights pulled out of the league, citing a new rule change as one of the main reasons for their departure.

=== ASEAN Basketball League (2017–present) ===
After pulling out from the IBL, the Knights subsequently announced their entry to the ASEAN Basketball League, being one of the four new teams to enter the league in the 2017–18 season. The Knights was the first Indonesian team to join the league since the 2014 ABL season, when the Indonesia Warriors and Laskar Dreya South Sumatra last played in the pan-ASEAN league. The team played under the name "CLS Knights Indonesia" in the ABL. But during the mid season of ABL 2018-2019, on 11 January 2019 they announced their name change to "BTN CLS Knights" upon signing a sponsorship deal with BTN Bank. The Knights Finished the 2018-2019 ABL Season as the ABL Champion after defeating the Singapore Slingers in 5 games, Maxie Esho won the finals MVP after dropping 25 points in game 5.

=== ASEAN Basketball League Champions (2019) ===
CLS Knights won against Singapore Slingers with spectacular fashion in their home arena at OCBC Arena in Singapore, they took the championship after a 2–2 rally with Singapore Slingers. During the 2017–2018 season, the CLS Knights did not even make the playoffs, started off the season with 2–7. Eventually, CLS Knights finished off the season by winning 15 and losing 11, giving them the fourth seed in the playoffs. The first round took off on March 31, giving CLS Knights the 2–1 sweep. The Second round began, the hardest challenger CLS has faced off in the playoffs; CLS Knights took over the game with another 2–1 sweep. The Finals began, CLS Knights was not expecting any spectacular results knowing that Jerran Young will be playing in the final. The first game went on, CLS taking game 1 at OCBC Arena; eventually, they lost their next 2 games at OCBC Arena and GOR Kertajaya Surabaya. The second home game of CLS Knights is where they shined their powers again, taking the game 87–74. The final game is the most intense game so far in the playoffs, especially for a CLS Knights fan. CLS Knights were struggling during the first half, but they eventually found their rhythm and performed a spectacular comeback and taking the game. The CLS Knights was declared the champion of the ASEAN Basketball League champion for the 2018–2019 season. Soon after that, they announced that they won't be playing in the ABL 2019-2020 season

== Players ==
=== Roster 2018–19 ===
Note: Flags indicate national team eligibility at FIBA-sanctioned events. Players may hold other non-FIBA nationalities not displayed.

Pos	Name	Age	Nationality	No	Height	University
SG/SF	Doug Herring Jr. (WI)	32	United States	1	191 cm	Utica College
SG/SF	Brandon Jawato	25	United States	3	193 cm	University of Hawaiʻi at Mānoa
PG	Wei Long Wong	30	Singapore	5	175 cm	Nanyang Technological University
PG/SG	Ngurah Wisnu	28	Indonesia	8	180 cm	University of Surabaya
SG/SF	Sandy Febiansyakh (c)	32	Indonesia	9	190 cm	University of Surabaya
PG/SF	Rachmad Febri Utomo	34	Indonesia	10	180 cm	
PG	Arif Hidayat	27	Indonesia	11	177 cm	University of Surabaya
C	Darryl Watkins (WI)	34	United States	13	213 cm	Syracuse University
PG	Jan Misael Panagan	24	Indonesia	15	179 cm	Harapan Bangsa Institute of Technology
C	Firman Dwi Nugroho	28	Indonesia	16	200 cm	Satya Wacana Christian University
SG/SF	Katon Adjie Baskoro	24	Indonesia	17	184 cm	University of Surabaya
PF/C	Maxie Esho (WI)	27	United States	18	207 cm	University of Massachusetts Amherst
C	Moh. Saroni	22	Indonesia	24	199 cm	University of Surabaya
PG	Bima Riski Ardiansyah	28	Indonesia	27	182 cm	

=== Depth chart ===
Pos.	Starting 5	Bench 1	Bench 2	Reserves
C	Darryl Watkins	Firman Dwi Nugroho
PF	Maxie Esho	Moh. Saroni
SF	Brandon Jawato	Rachmad Febri Utomo	Bima Riski
SG	Doug Herring Jr.	Sandy Febiansyakh	Katon Adjie Baskoro
PG	Wei Long Wong	Arif Hidayat	Ngurah Wisnu	Jan Misael Panagan

=== Individual awards ===
ABL Finals MVP Award

- Maxie Esho – 2018–19

ABL Mid-Season Fan Award, Local MVP Award

- Wong Wei Long – 2018–19

ABL Mid-Season Fan Award, Best Defensive Player Award

- Doug Herring Jr. – 2018–19

Sonny Hendrawan MVP Award

- Jamarr Andre Johnson – 2016

Top Steal IBL/NBL

- Dimaz Muharri – 2010–11, 2012–13, 2013–14

Top Assist IBL/NBL

- Mario Wuysang – 2014–15, 2016, 2017
- Dimaz Muharri – 2013–14

Rookie of the Year

- Jamarr Andre Johnson – 2016

Top Score IBL/NBL

- Jamarr Andre Johnson – 2016

Coach of the Year

- Kim Dong-Won – 2013–14

Sixth-Man of the Year

- Rachmad Febri Utomo – 2011
- Arif Hidayat – 2017

=== Notable players ===
Note: Flags indicate national team eligibility at FIBA-sanctioned events. Players may hold other non-FIBA nationalities not displayed.

Criteria

To appear in this section a player must have either:

- Set a club record or won an individual award while at the club
- Played at least one official international match for their national team at any time
- Played at least one official NBA match at any time.

- (Indonesia) Tony Agus
- (Indonesia) Andrie Ekayana Santosa
- (Indonesia) Agustinus Indrajaya
- (Indonesia) Kaleb Ramot Gemilang
- (Indonesia) Dwi Haryoko
- (Indonesia) Jamarr Andre Johnson (2016–17)
- (Indonesia) Ebrahim Enguio Lopez
- (Indonesia) Dimaz Muharri (2009–15)
- (Indonesia) Wijaya Saputra
- (Indonesia) Ahmad Syarif (2014–16)
- (Indonesia) Mario Wuysang
- (Indonesia) Firman Dwi Nugroho
- (Canada) Ashton Smith (2017)
- (Philippines) Rudy Lingganay (2017)
- (Philippines) (United States) Keith Jensen (2017)
- (United States) Evan Brock (2017)
- (United States) Duke Crews (2017)
- (United States) Frederick Lish (2017-18)
- (United States) DeChriston rMcKinney (2016)
- (United States) Brian Williams (2017-18)

Name	Pos
Brian Rowsom	Head coach
Koko Nugroho	Asst. Coach

== Season-by-season record ==
Season	Coach	Regular Season				Post Season			
Season	Coach	Won	Lost	Win %	Finish	Won	Lost	Win %	Result
2017–18	Koko Heru Setyo Nugroho	5	15	.250	6th	Did not qualify			
2018–19	Brian Rowsom	15	11	.577	4th	7	4	.636	Champions
Totals		20	26	.435	-	7	4	.636	
