= GOR Kertajaya Surabaya =

Multi-purpose sport arena in Surabaya, Indonesia

GOR Kertajaya
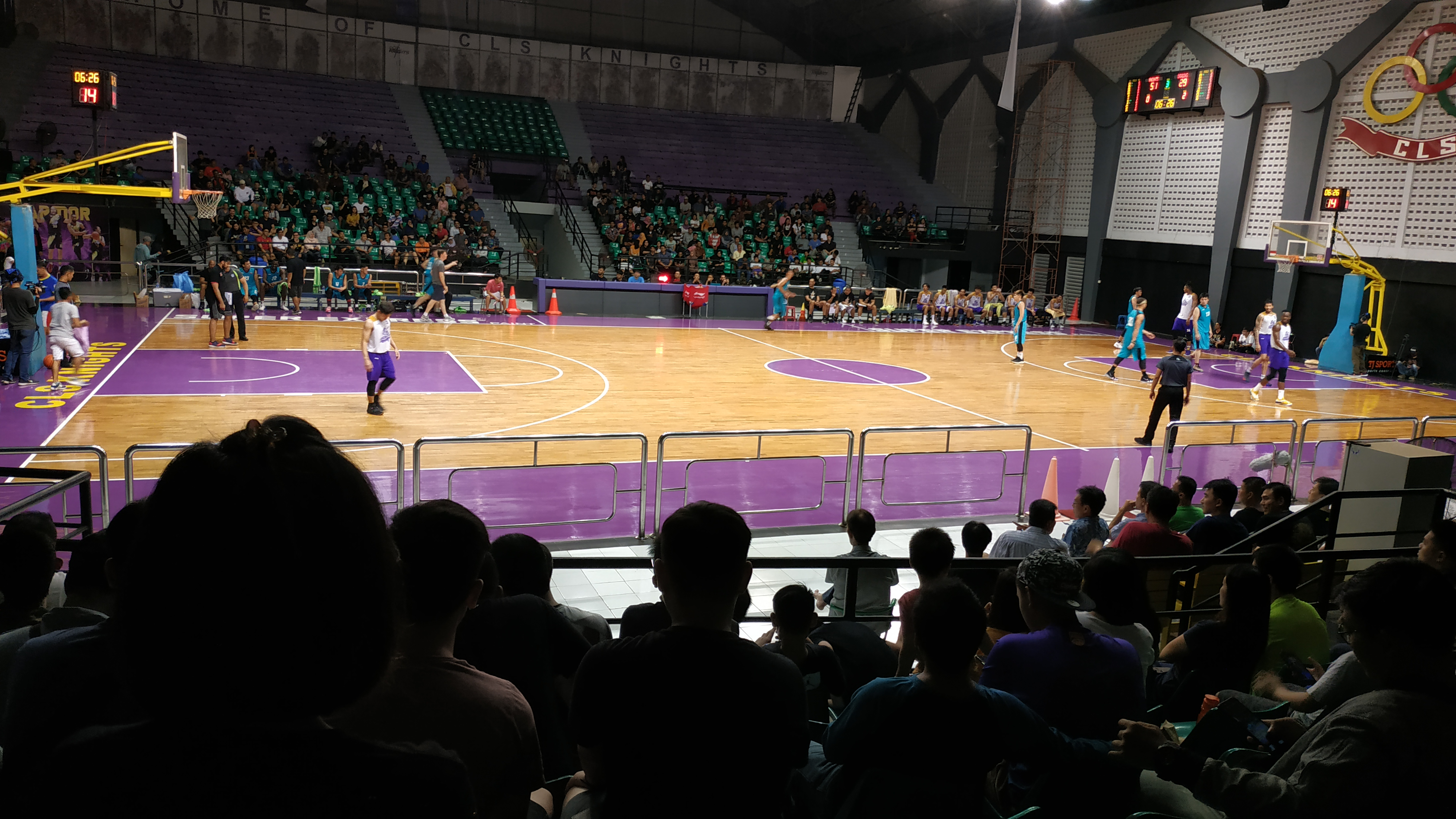

- Location in Surabaya
- Location: Surabaya, East Java, Indonesia
- Coordinates: 7°16′43″S 112°46′45″E
- Capacity: 4,000

Construction
- Opened: 1990

Tenants
- CLS Knights Surabaya; Surabaya Fever

GOR Kertajaya is a multi-purpose sport arena in Surabaya, East Java, Indonesia. The arena is home to the CLS Knights Surabaya of the ASEAN Basketball League (ABL), and Surabaya Fever of the WIBL.
