= Darryl Watkins =

American basketball player (born 1984)

Personal information
- Born: November 8, 1984 (age 42) Paterson, New Jersey, U.S.
- Listed height: 6 ft 11 in (2.11 m)
- Listed weight: 258 lb (117 kg)

Career information
- High school: Paterson Catholic (Paterson, New Jersey)
- College: Syracuse (2003–2007)
- NBA draft: 2007: undrafted
- Playing career: 2007–2020
- Position: Center
- Number: 13, 31

Career history
- 2007: Sacramento Kings
- 2007–2008: Los Angeles D-Fenders
- 2008: Iowa Energy
- 2008–2009: Tianjin Ronggang
- 2010–2011: Sagesse
- 2011–2012: ETHA Engomis
- 2012: New Orleans Hornets
- 2012–2013: Lukoil Academic
- 2013–2014: Spirou
- 2014–2015: Chalons-Reims
- 2015–2018: ASVEL
- 2019–2020: BTN CLS Knights Indonesia

Career highlights
- ASEAN Basketball League Champion (2019); Bulgarian League champion (2013); 2x French League All-Star (2016, 2017)
- Stats at NBA.com
- Stats at Basketball Reference

Darryl Finesse Watkins (born November 8, 1984) is an American former professional basketball player who played for BTN CLS Knights Indonesia of the Asean Basketball League. He is a former college basketball player for the Syracuse Orange who has a reputation for his shot-blocking ability.

== High school ==
A first-team all-state pick as a senior, Watkins was a four-time all-county selection and earned all-area his final two seasons. He averaged approximately 16 points, 11 rebounds, six blocks and three assists in his senior campaign.

He was rated 35th nationally and seventh at center by ESPN.com, 35th by PrepStars, 51st by Insiders Hoops, and 60th by Hoop Scoop. New Jersey Hoops ranked him 4th in New Jersey.

== College ==
Used as a backup for his first two seasons at Syracuse, Watkins became Syracuse's starting center in his junior year. He registered 99 blocks that season, and ranked 16th in Division I blocked shots per game (2.8). He finished the season averaging 7.1 points and 7.3 rebounds.

Watkins averaged 8.1 points and 7.5 rebounds a game in his senior year. He missed several games early on in the season due to a bruised nose, but still appeared in 33 games, starting 32 of them. He continued his intimidation inside, ranking seventh in Division I players in blocked-shot average (3.4). In the NIT, Watkins blocked six shots against San Diego State, tying Syracuse's NIT record.

Watkins wore # 13 as a member of the Orange.

=== College legacy ===
Watkins finished his career with 67 starts in 106 appearances with averages of 6.0 points and 5.8 rebounds per game. He ranked fifth in career blocks at Syracuse with 263 and recorded three or more blocks in a game 48 times during his tenure. Highlights include blocking a career-high 8 shots in a 67–62 win over Cornell on November 9, 2005, and matching that with another 8-block effort in a 77–76 win over Cincinnati on January 27, 2007.

== Professional career ==
=== Sacramento Kings ===
On June 29, 2007, Watkins signed a free agent contract with the Sacramento Kings. Watkins played for the Kings' mini-camp in early July and also in their Vegas summer league. In the Vegas summer league, he averaged 3.8 points, 3.4 rebounds and 0.8 blocks per game, including a nine-point, three-rebound effort against the Houston Rockets. In August 2007, Watkins signed a partially guaranteed deal worth an estimated $450,000 with the Kings and appeared in nine games.

=== D-League Stint (Iowa Energy and LA D-Fenders) ===
On December 10, the Kings waived Watkins. Watkins split the rest of the season with the Los Angeles D-Fenders and the Iowa Energy of the NBA Development League.

=== Los Angeles Clippers ===
Watkins played for the Los Angeles Clippers in the 2008 Las Vegas Summer League.

=== San Antonio Spurs ===
On September 11, 2008, Watkins signed a two-year deal with the San Antonio Spurs. He, along with Devin Green and Salim Stoudamire, were cut on October 23.

=== Tianjin (CBA) ===
When no NBA team signed Watkins, he signed with Tianjin Ronggang of the CBA on November 6, 2008.

=== 2009–2010 ===
KK Crvena zvezda (BC Red Star Belgrade) agreed to sign Watkins for the 2009–10 season. However, Watkins opted to remain in the United States after the birth of his daughter on August 14. He tried out for the Cleveland Cavaliers, but was waived on October 22, 2009.

=== 2010–2011 ===
Watkins played for the Indiana Pacers in the Orlando Pro Summer League in 2010. He then signed a contract with Sagesse in the Lebanese Basketball League.

=== 2011–2012 ===
Watkins played with Etha Engomis of Cyprus for 2011–12. The New Orleans Hornets signed Watkins to a 10-day contract on April 18, 2012. In his first game with New Orleans, he recorded 13 rebounds (a game high) and 2 points in 29 minutes in a loss to Memphis.

=== Philadelphia 76ers ===
On July 11, 2012, Watkins was traded to the Philadelphia 76ers in a three-team trade. The Sixers waived him just five days later, on July 16, after acquiring Kwame Brown.

=== Return to Europe ===
In August 2012, he signed a one-year deal with PBC Lukoil Academic in Bulgaria. On August 21, 2013, he signed a one-year deal with Spirou Charleroi.

In July 2014, he signed with Chalons-Reims of the French LNB Pro A.

On August 10, 2015, Watkins signed with ASVEL Basket for the 2015–16 season.

=== CLS Knights ===
On January 4, 2019, Watkins signed the CLS Knights of the ASEAN Basketball League replacing Stephen Hurts as CLS starting Center

== Career statistics ==
Legend
GP	Games played	GS	Games started	MPG	Minutes per game
FG%	Field goal percentage	3P%	3-point field goal percentage	FT%	Free throw percentage
RPG	Rebounds per game	APG	Assists per game	SPG	Steals per game
BPG	Blocks per game	PPG	Points per game	**Bold**	Career high

=== NBA ===
Source

=== Regular season ===
Year	Team	GP	GS	MPG	FG%	3P%	FT%	RPG	APG	SPG	BPG	PPG
2007–08	Sacramento	**9**	0	7.9	.333	–	.400	1.3	.0	.2	.2	1.3
2011–12	New Orleans	5	0	**19.6**	**.500**	–	**.500**	**5.4**	**.6**	**1.0**	**.8**	**4.6**
Career		14	0	12.1	.414	–	.478	2.8	.2	.5	.4	2.5
