= Macau Wolf Warriors =

- Leagues: ASEAN Basketball League
- Founded: 2018
- Folded: 2019
- History: List: Zhuhai Wolf Warriors (2018–2019) Macau Wolf Warriors (2019)
- Arena: Foshan Shishan Gymnasium; Zhongshan Shaxi Gymnasium
- Location: Macau
- Team colors: Green and Gold
- President: Joaquim Lobo
- Team manager: Jiang Hao
- Head coach: John Todd Purves
- Championships: None
Home	Away

Macau Wolf Warriors
- Traditional Chinese: 澳門戰狼
- Simplified Chinese: 澳门战狼
Transcriptions
Standard Mandarin
- Hanyu Pinyin: Àomén Zhànláng
Yue: Cantonese
- Jyutping: ou3 mun4*2 zin3 long4

Zhuhai Wolf Warriors
- Traditional Chinese: 珠海戰狼
- Simplified Chinese: 珠海战狼
Transcriptions
Standard Mandarin
- Hanyu Pinyin: Zhūhǎi Zhànláng
Yue: Cantonese
- Jyutping: zyu1 hoi2 zin3 long4

The Wolf Warriors also known as the Macau Wolf Warriors is a professional basketball club in the ASEAN Basketball League (ABL) based in Macau. The team was formerly based in Zhuhai and was known as Zhuhai Wolf Warriors.

== History ==
The then Zhuhai Wolf Warriors entered ABL in August 2018. The Warriors are claimed to be the first professional team based in Zhuhai city in Guangdong, China in any sports. The team relocated in Macau before the start of the 2019–20 ABL season.

== Roster ==
Note: Flags indicate national team eligibility at FIBA-sanctioned events. Players may hold other non-FIBA nationalities not displayed.

Wolf Warriors roster
Players
Coaches

Pos.	No.	Nat.	Name	Ht.	Wt.	Age
G	0	(United States) (China)	Scott Ewing
G	2	(China)	Cris Shentu	1.88 m (6 ft 2 in)	84 kg (185 lb)	30 – 10 August 1995
F	5	(China)	Xu Yan	1.96 m (6 ft 5 in)	92 kg (203 lb)	31 – 16 November 1994
G	9	(United States)	Doug Herring Jr. (WI)	1.91 m (6 ft 3 in)	91 kg (201 lb)	38 – 29 September 1987
F	10	(Macau)	Wai Seng Chan	1.98 m (6 ft 6 in)	95 kg (209 lb)	27 – 6 June 1998
G	11	(Macau)	Chi Fong Choi	1.78 m (5 ft 10 in)	72 kg (159 lb)	28 – 4 June 1997
G	14	(Macau)	Man Io Tang	1.83 m (6 ft 0 in)	80 kg (176 lb)	29 – 10 April 1997
G	20	(United States) (China)	Derek King	1.88 m (6 ft 2 in)	90 kg (198 lb)	32 – 13 September 1993
F	21	(China)	Xu Liu	1.98 m (6 ft 6 in)	100 kg (220 lb)	41 – 22 February 1985
C	23	(China)	Cai Chen	2.06 m (6 ft 9 in)	115 kg (254 lb)	33 – 13 February 1993
G	25	(China)	Yue Hu
F	31	(China)	He Zhang	1.96 m (6 ft 5 in)	115 kg (254 lb)
C	32	(China)	He Feng Sun	2.01 m (6 ft 7 in)	100 kg (220 lb)	33 – 5 September 1992
F	42	(United States)	Julian Boyd (WI)	2.01 m (6 ft 7 in)	104 kg (229 lb)	36 – 2 February 1990
C	55	(United States)	Steven Thomas (WI)	2.06 m (6 ft 9 in)	107 kg (236 lb)	45 – 14 April 1981
G	67	(China)	Zhong Xianchao	1.78 m (5 ft 10 in)	67 kg (148 lb)	30 – 25 August 1995
G	85	(China)	Tang Zhi Keng

Head coach

- (United States) Todd Purves

Assistant coach(es)

- (United States) Jordan Collins

Team manager

- Joaquim Lobo

Legend

- (C) Team captain
- (WI) World import
- Injured

== Home venues ==
Initially, the Macau Wolf Warriors' home venue was at the Jinan University which has a 2,500-capacity basketball venue. They later moved their home venue to the Doumen Gymnasium in Zhuhai, China.

Current

- Foshan Shishan Gymnasium, Foshan
- Zhongshan Shaxi Gymnasium, Zhongshan

Former

- Doumen Gymnasium, Zhuhai
- Zhuhai Jinan University, Zhuhai
- University of Macau Sports Complex, Macau

== Season by season ==
Season	League	Regular season					Playoffs	Head coach
Season	League	Finish	Pld	W	L	Win%	Playoffs	Head coach
2018–19	ABL	10th	26	2	24	.077	DNQ	Matt Skillman
2019–20	ABL	8th	13	5	8	.385	Cancelled	Todd Purves
2020–21	Cancelled due to the COVID-19 pandemic							
2021–22	Cancelled due to the COVID-19 pandemic							

== Head coaches ==
Nat.	Name	Tenure	Totals				Regular season				Playoffs			
Nat.	Name	Tenure	G	W	L	PCT	G	W	L	PCT	G	W	L	PCT
(United States)	Matt Skillman	2018–2019	26	2	24	.077	26	2	24	.077	0	0	0	–
(United States)	Todd Purves	2019	3	0	3	0.0	3	0	3	0.0	0	0	0	–
Totals			29	2	27	.077	26	2	24	.077	0	0	0	–
