= 2019–20 Davao Occidental Tigers season =

- MPBL champions
- Division champions
- Head coach: Don Dulay

Results
- Record: 26–4 (.867)
- Place: Division: 1st (South)
- Playoff finish: MPBL champions (won vs. San Juan, 3–1)

Davao Occidental Tigers seasons

The 2019–20 Davao Occidental Tigers season was the second season of the franchise in the Maharlika Pilipinas Basketball League (MPBL).

The Tigers entered the season as the reigning South Division champions with a 20–5 record in the previous season. Davao Occidental followed that up by tying the record for most regular season wins in a single season at 26, tying the San Juan Knights that same season and later the Pampanga Giant Lanterns in 2023 and 2024. With a 26–4 record, Davao Occidental became the first, and only team to date, to clinch the best division record in back-to-back seasons.

In the playoffs, Davao Occidental first beat Bicol in three games and later swept Zamboanga. Their South Division finals series against the Basilan Steel was tied before it was suspended due to the COVID-19 pandemic. By the time the playoffs resumed in 2021, multiple Basilan Steel members were tested positive for the virus, ruling them out of the playoffs and setting up a rematch against the San Juan Knights in the national finals, which the Tigers would get their revenge and win the series in four games. Due to their move to the Pilipinas Super League in 2022, the Tigers wouldn't compete in the MPBL until their eventual return in 2024.

All of the team's home games this season were played in four venues across the Metro Davao area, the most concurrent home venues for a team in a single season. These include the Davao City Recreation Center, Rizal Memorial Colleges, and University of Southeastern Philippines in Davao City and Davao del Norte Sports Complex in Tagum.

== Regular season ==
=== Standings ===
Pos	Team	Pld	W	L	PCT	GB	Qualification
1	Davao Occidental Tigers	30	26	4	.867	—	Playoffs
2	Bacoor City Strikers	30	24	6	.800	2	Playoffs
3	Basilan Steel	30	20	10	.667	6	Playoffs
4	Batangas City Athletics	30	19	11	.633	7	Playoffs
5	Zamboanga Family's Brand Sardines	30	18	12	.600 (Note: Zamboanga (1.071), Iloilo (0.976), and General Santos (0.960) are ranked based on head-to-head point quotient.)	8	Playoffs

Source: Standings
Rules for classification: 1) Wins; 2a) If two teams are tied, head-to-head match-up; 2b) If three or more teams are tied, head-to-head point quotient; 3) overall point quotient; 4) coin toss.

=== Schedule ===
2019–20 Davao Occidental Tigers season schedule
Game	Date	Opponent	Score	Location	Record	Recap
1	June 12	Zamboanga	W 84–82	SM Mall of Asia Arena	1–0	
2	June 21	Caloocan	W 76–69	Marist School	2–0	
3	June 27	Bacoor City	L 70–73	Strike Gymnasium	2–1	
4	July 8	Pasay	W 69–67	Cuneta Astrodome	3–1	
5	July 16	Rizal	W 86–55	Blue Eagle Gym	4–1	
6	July 20	Bacolod	W 85–74	Cuneta Astrodome	5–1	
7	July 29	Sarangani	W 104–75	Navotas Sports Complex	6–1	
8	August 7	Navotas	W 94–74	Bulacan Capitol Gymnasium	7–1	
9	August 12	Bataan	W 83–75	Filoil Flying V Centre	8–1	
10	August 16	Quezon City	W 90–82	Pasig Sports Center	9–1	
11	August 29	Cebu	W 65–61	Cuneta Astrodome	10–1	
12	September 5	Pampanga	L 62–65	Angeles University Foundation	10–2	
13	September 13	General Santos	W 84–75	Olivarez College	11–2	
14	September 17	Bicol	W 88–76	Angeles University Foundation	12–2	
15	September 21	Basilan	W 76–71	La Salle Coliseum	13–2	
16	September 27	Batangas City	W 67–57	(United Arab Emirates) Hamdan Sports Complex	14–2	
17	October 7	Bulacan	W 91–75	Batangas State University	15–2	
18	October 19	Iloilo	W 89–76	Ibalong Centrum for Recreation	16–2	
19	October 26	Valenzuela	L 65–67	Rizal Memorial Colleges	16–3	
20	November 9	Mindoro	W 99–84	Batangas City Coliseum	17–3	
21	November 23	Manila	W 79–76	Davao City Recreation Center	18–3	
22	November 29	Imus	W 94–78	El Salvador City Gymnasium	19–3	
23	December 17	Pasig	W 75–71	Valenzuela Astrodome	20–3	
24	January 14	Makati	W 101–79	San Andres Sports Complex	21–3	
25	January 18	San Juan	L 65–84	University of Southeastern Philippines	21–4	
26	January 22	Parañaque	W 78–70	San Andres Sports Complex	22–4	
27	January 29	Muntinlupa	W 106–90	Batangas City Coliseum	23–4	
28	February 3	Nueva Ecija	W 86–79	Strike Gymnasium	24–4	
29	February 6	Biñan City	W 72–66	Alonte Sports Arena	25–4	
30	February 10	Marikina	W 85–83	San Andres Sports Complex	26–4	
Source: Schedule

== Playoffs ==
=== Schedule ===
2020 Davao Occidental Tigers playoffs schedule
Round	Game	Date	Opponent	Score	Location	Series	Recap
Division quarterfinals	1	February 17	Bicol	W 77–71	Davao City Recreation Center	1–0	
Division quarterfinals	2	February 21	Bicol	L 81–84	Batangas City Coliseum	1–1	
Division quarterfinals	3	February 26	Bicol	W 64–56	Davao City Recreation Center	2–1	
Division semifinals	1	March 2	Zamboanga	W 47–28	Davao City Recreation Center	1–0	
Division semifinals	2	March 5	Zamboanga	W 62–58	Strike Gymnasium	2–0	
Division finals	1	March 9	Basilan	L 72–74	Davao del Norte Sports Complex	0–1	
Division finals	2	March 11	Basilan	W 81–76	Lamitan Capitol Gymnasium	1–1	
Division finals	3	March 17 (Note: Postponed to 2021 due to the COVID-19 pandemic.)	Basilan	W by default (Note: Originally, scheduled for March 17, 2021, Davao Occidental won the game by default due to multiple Basilan Steel members being tested positive for COVID-19.)	Subic Bay Gymnasium	2–1	
National finals	1	March 17	San Juan	W 77–75	Subic Bay Gymnasium	1–0	
National finals	2	March 18	San Juan	L 65–70	Subic Bay Gymnasium	1–1	
National finals	3	March 20	San Juan	W 66–58	Subic Bay Gymnasium	2–1	
National finals	4	March 21	San Juan	W 89–88	Subic Bay Gymnasium	3–1	
Source: Schedule
