= 2019–20 Zamboanga Family's Brand Sardines season =

Results
- Record: 18–12 (.600)
- Place: Division: 5th (South)
- Playoff finish: Division Semifinals (lost vs. Davao Occidental, 0–2)

Zamboanga Family's Brand Sardines seasons

The 2019–20 Zamboanga Family's Brand Sardines season was the second season of the franchise in the Maharlika Pilipinas Basketball League (MPBL).

The team entered this season coming off a run to the Division Semifinals in their previous campaign. With their 15th win on December 17, Zamboanga were able to improve from their previous 12–13 run by winning percentage. Their next game on December 27 was when they clinched their first winning season with their 16th victory. They finished the season in a three-way tie for fifth place in the South Division with an 18–12 record. They would claim the fifth seed through the tiebreaker criteria.

Their Division Quarterfinals matchup saw them get revenge on the Batangas City Athletics with a 2–1 series win. They would then get swept by the eventual champion Davao Occidental Tigers in the Division Semifinals.

The team's only home game was played on August 31 at the Mayor Vitaliano D. Agan Coliseum in Zamboanga City.

== Regular season ==
=== Standings ===
Pos	Team	Pld	W	L	PCT	GB	Qualification
3	Basilan Steel	30	20	10	.667	6	Playoffs
4	Batangas City Athletics	30	19	11	.633	7	Playoffs
5	Zamboanga Family's Brand Sardines	30	18	12	.600 (Note: Zamboanga (1.071), Iloilo (0.976), and General Santos (0.960) are ranked based on head-to-head point quotient.)	8	Playoffs
6	Iloilo United Royals	30	18	12	.600	8	Playoffs
7	GenSan Warriors	30	18	12	.600	8	Playoffs

Source: Standings
Rules for classification: 1) Wins; 2a) If two teams are tied, head-to-head match-up; 2b) If three or more teams are tied, head-to-head point quotient; 3) overall point quotient; 4) coin toss.

=== Schedule ===
2019–20 Zamboanga Family's Brand Sardines season schedule
Game	Date	Opponent	Score	Location	Record	Recap
1	June 12	Davao Occidental	L 82–84	SM Mall of Asia Arena	0–1	
2	June 22	Pasig	W 82–69	Muntinlupa Sports Complex	1–1	
3	July 2	Caloocan	L 74–83	Bulacan Capitol Gymnasium	1–2	
4	July 8	Bacoor City	L 75–83	Cuneta Astrodome	1–3	
5	July 11	Bulacan	W 60–59	Blue Eagle Gym	2–3	
6	July 19	Pasay	W 83–82	Alonte Sports Arena	3–3	
7	July 25	Rizal	W 95–76	Pasig Sports Center	4–3	
8	August 1	Bacolod	L 82–84	Cuneta Astrodome	4–4	
9	August 7	Sarangani	W 100–75	Bulacan Capitol Gymnasium	5–4	
10	August 16	Parañaque	W 74–65	Pasig Sports Center	6–4	
11	August 22	Bataan	L 79–92	Bataan People's Center	6–5	
12	August 26	Batangas City	L 67–77	San Andres Sports Complex	6–6	
13	August 31	Bicol	L 80–84	Mayor Vitaliano D. Agan Coliseum	6–7	
14	September 4	Quezon City	W 71–60	Bataan People's Center	7–7	
15	September 9	Nueva Ecija	W 109–85	Muntinlupa Sports Complex	8–7	
16	September 18	Cebu	L 70–74	San Andres Sports Complex	8–8	
17	September 25	General Santos	W 62–52	Caloocan Sports Complex	9–8	
18	October 5	Basilan	W 83–78	Rizal Memorial Colleges	10–8	
19	October 10	Pampanga	W 73–59	Strike Gymnasium	11–8	
20	October 24	Marikina	W 74–62	Marist School	12–8	
21	November 13	Makati	L 106–111	Ynares Center	12–9	
22	November 19	Biñan City	L 72–74	Alonte Sports Arena	12–10	
23	November 22	Navotas	W 80–65	Pasig Sports Center	13–10	
24	November 26	Mindoro	W 84–64	Caloocan Sports Complex	14–10	
25	December 17	Valenzuela	W 85–78	Valenzuela Astrodome	15–10	
26	December 27	Imus	W 88–72	(Canada) Winsport Arena	16–10	
27	January 18	Iloilo	L 58–60	University of Southeastern Philippines	16–11	
28	January 24	Muntinlupa	W 75–63	Bataan People's Center	17–11	
29	January 31	San Juan	W 69–64	Cuneta Astrodome	18–11	
30	February 10	Manila	L 71–74	San Andres Sports Complex	18–12	
Source: Schedule

== Playoffs ==
=== Schedule ===
2020 Zamboanga Family's Brand Sardines playoffs schedule
Round	Game	Date	Opponent	Score	Location	Series	Recap
Division Quarterfinals	1	February 17	Batangas City	W 78–74	Davao City Recreation Center	1–0	Recap
Division Quarterfinals	2	February 21	Batangas City	L 75–84	Batangas City Coliseum	1–1	Recap
Division Quarterfinals	3	February 26	Batangas City	W 69–52	Davao City Recreation Center	2–1	Recap
Division Semifinals	1	March 2	Davao Occidental	L 28–47	Davao City Recreation Center	0–1	Recap
Division Semifinals	2	March 5	Davao Occidental	L 58–62	Strike Gymnasium	0–2	Recap
Source: Schedule
