= 2019–20 Iloilo United Royals season =

Results
- Record: 18–12 (.600)
- Place: Division: 6th (South)
- Playoff finish: Division Quarterfinals (lost vs. Basilan, 0–2)

Iloilo United Royals seasons

The 2019–20 Iloilo United Royals season was the inaugural season of the franchise in the Maharlika Pilipinas Basketball League (MPBL).

The Royals would play their first game on June 28 against the Parañaque Patriots, who they would beat to claim their first franchise victory. In their first eleven games, they would go 7–4. From November 4 to December 16, Iloilo went on a six-game winning streak, which would help the team finish with an 18–12 record and the sixth seed in the South Division. They would be swept by the Basilan Steel in the Division Quarterfinals.

The team's inaugural home game, and the only such this season, was played on September 19 at the University of San Agustin in Iloilo City.

== Regular season ==
=== Standings ===
Pos	Team	Pld	W	L	PCT	GB	Qualification
4	Batangas City Athletics	30	19	11	.633	7	Playoffs
5	Zamboanga Family's Brand Sardines	30	18	12	.600 (Note: Zamboanga (1.071), Iloilo (0.976), and General Santos (0.960) are ranked based on head-to-head point quotient.)	8	Playoffs
6	Iloilo United Royals	30	18	12	.600	8	Playoffs
7	GenSan Warriors	30	18	12	.600	8	Playoffs
8	Bicol Volcanoes	30	16	14	.533	10	Playoffs

Source: Standings
Rules for classification: 1) Wins; 2a) If two teams are tied, head-to-head match-up; 2b) If three or more teams are tied, head-to-head point quotient; 3) overall point quotient; 4) coin toss.

=== Schedule ===
2019–20 Iloilo United Royals season schedule
Game	Date	Opponent	Score	Location	Record	Recap
1	June 28	Parañaque		Filoil Flying V Centre	1–0	
2	July 1	Bataan		Blue Eagle Gym	2–0	
3	July 6	Quezon City		Angeles University Foundation	2–1	
4	July 10	Nueva Ecija		Olivarez College	3–1	
5	July 15	Cebu		Valenzuela Astrodome	3–2	
6	July 20	General Santos		Cuneta Astrodome	3–3	
7	July 27	Bicol		Ibalong Centrum for Recreation	4–3	
8	August 2	Basilan		Pasig Sports Center	4–4	
9	August 14	Bulacan		Angeles University Foundation	5–4	
10	August 22	Marikina		Bataan People's Center	6–4	
11	August 26	Manila		San Andres Sports Complex	7–4	
12	September 4	Mindoro		Bataan People's Center	7–5	
13	September 9	Valenzuela		Muntinlupa Sports Complex	8–5	
14	September 19	Pasay		University of San Agustin	8–6	
15	October 3	Pampanga		Cuneta Astrodome	9–6	
16	October 19	Davao Occidental		Ibalong Centrum for Recreation	9–7	
17	October 24	Makati		Marist School	9–8	
18	November 4	Navotas		Ynares Center	10–8	
19	November 7	Bacolod		Valenzuela Astrodome	11–8	
20	November 18	Pasig		Makati Coliseum	12–8	
21	November 21	Imus		Marikina Sports Center	13–8	
22	November 26	Caloocan		Caloocan Sports Complex	14–8	
23	December 16	Rizal		Imus City Sports Complex	15–8	
24	December 20	Muntinlupa		San Andres Sports Complex	15–9	
25	January 9	Batangas City		Angeles University Foundation	15–10	
26	January 18	Zamboanga		University of Southeastern Philippines	16–10	
27	January 23	San Juan		Ynares Sports Arena	16–11	
28	January 27	Biñan City		Ynares Center	17–11	
29	January 30	Sarangani		Bulacan Capitol Gymnasium	18–11	
30	February 6	Bacoor City		Alonte Sports Arena	18–12	
Source: Schedule

== Playoffs ==
=== Schedule ===
2020 Iloilo United Royals playoffs schedule
Round	Game	Date	Opponent	Score	Location	Series	Recap
Division Quarterfinals	1	February 19	Basilan		Strike Gymnasium	0–1	Recap
Division Quarterfinals	2	February 24	Basilan		Lamitan Capitol Gymnasium	0–2	Recap
Source: Schedule
