= 2019–20 Batangas City Athletics season =

Results
- Record: 19–11 (.633)
- Place: Division: 4th (South)
- Playoff finish: Division Quarterfinals (lost vs. Zamboanga, 1–2)

Batangas City Athletics seasons

The 2019–20 Batangas City Athletics season was the third season of the franchise in the Maharlika Pilipinas Basketball League (MPBL).

The Athletics were coming off a run to the Division Finals heading into this season. The team went 12–5 in their first 17 games before losing six of their next eight games. Batangas City made up for it by capping off the regular season with a five-game winning streak, claiming the fourth seed in the South Division. Despite tying their Division Quarterfinals series against the Zamboanga Family's Brand Sardines, they would lose the deciding game 3. As of 2023, it is the only season in which the Batangas City franchise did not reach the penultimate round of the playoffs.

The team played most of their home slate at Batangas City Coliseum, with one home game held at Batangas State University.

== Regular season ==
=== Standings ===
Pos	Team	Pld	W	L	PCT	GB	Qualification
2	Bacoor City Strikers	30	24	6	.800	2	Playoffs
3	Basilan Steel	30	20	10	.667	6	Playoffs
4	Batangas City Athletics	30	19	11	.633	7	Playoffs
5	Zamboanga Family's Brand Sardines	30	18	12	.600 (Note: Zamboanga (1.071), Iloilo (0.976), and General Santos (0.960) are ranked based on head-to-head point quotient.)	8	Playoffs
6	Iloilo United Royals	30	18	12	.600	8	Playoffs

Source: Standings
Rules for classification: 1) Wins; 2a) If two teams are tied, head-to-head match-up; 2b) If three or more teams are tied, head-to-head point quotient; 3) overall point quotient; 4) coin toss.

=== Schedule ===
2019–20 Batangas City Athletics season schedule
Game	Date	Opponent	Score	Location	Record	Recap
1	June 15	Muntinlupa		Batangas City Coliseum	1–0	
2	July 9	Manila		San Andres Sports Complex	1–1	
3	July 15	Basilan		Valenzuela Astrodome	2–1	
4	July 18	Caloocan		Batangas City Coliseum	3–1	
5	August 5	Pasay		Filoil Flying V Centre	3–2	
6	August 13	Rizal		Strike Gymnasium	3–3	
7	August 16	Pasig		Pasig Sports Center	4–3	
8	August 20	Bacoor City		Batangas City Coliseum	5–3	
9	August 26	Zamboanga		San Andres Sports Complex	6–3	
10	September 3	Parañaque		Blue Eagle Gym	6–4	
11	September 12	Sarangani		Batangas City Coliseum	7–4	
12	September 14	Bataan		Bataan People's Center	8–4	
13	September 23	Quezon City		Filoil Flying V Centre	9–4	
14	September 27	Davao Occidental		(United Arab Emirates) Hamdan Sports Complex	9–5	
15	September 28	Imus		(United Arab Emirates) Hamdan Sports Complex	10–5	
16	October 7	San Juan		Batangas State University	11–5	
17	October 16	General Santos		Batangas City Coliseum	12–5	
18	October 22	Bicol		Batangas City Coliseum	12–6	
19	November 9	Biñan City		Batangas City Coliseum	12–7	
20	November 23	Mindoro		Davao City Recreation Center	13–7	
21	November 28	Makati		Lagao Gymnasium	13–8	
22	December 18	Bulacan		Olivarez College	13–9	
23	January 6	Nueva Ecija		San Andres Sports Complex	13–10	
24	January 9	Iloilo		Angeles University Foundation	14–10	
25	January 16	Pampanga		Angeles University Foundation	14–11	
26	January 23	Navotas		Ynares Sports Arena	15–11	
27	January 29	Marikina		Batangas City Coliseum	16–11	
28	February 4	Bacolod		Cuneta Astrodome	17–11	
29	February 8	Valenzuela		Valenzuela Astrodome	18–11	
30	February 12	Cebu		Caloocan Sports Complex	19–11	
Source: Schedule

== Playoffs ==
=== Schedule ===
2020 Batangas City Athletics playoffs schedule
Round	Game	Date	Opponent	Score	Location	Series	Recap
Division Quarterfinals	1	February 17	Zamboanga		Davao City Recreation Center	0–1	Recap
Division Quarterfinals	2	February 21	Zamboanga		Batangas City Coliseum	1–1	Recap
Division Quarterfinals	3	February 26	Zamboanga		Davao City Recreation Center	1–2	Recap
Source: Schedule
