= 2019–20 Basilan Steel season =

Results
- Record: 20–10 (.667)
- Place: Division: 3rd (South)
- Playoff finish: Division finals (lost vs. Davao Occidental, 1–2)

Basilan Steel seasons

The 2019–20 Basilan Steel season was the second season of the franchise in the Maharlika Pilipinas Basketball League (MPBL).

The Steel were able to improve from their previous campaign after snatching their ninth win on September 17, surpassing their 7–18 record in win percentage. They would then win 11 of the remaining 13 games to finish the season 20–10 and finish as the third seed in the South Division.

Their playoff run began with a sweep against Iloilo followed by a 2–1 series victory over Bacoor City. In the division finals against the Davao Occidental Tigers, Basilan would win game 1 against the reigning division champions on opposing grounds before the Tigers tied the series in game 2. Following the one-year suspension due to the COVID-19 pandemic, game 3 was originally scheduled for March 10, 2021, but was postponed by a week due to a player being tested positive for the virus. By March 17, multiple members of the Basilan team had also been tested positive, thus the league decided to rule them out of the series, abruptly ending their season. Davao Occidental would eventually become champions in the national finals. Following the controversial ruling, the team moved to the Pilipinas VisMin Super Cup in 2021, then the Pilipinas Super League in 2022 before ultimately returning to the MPBL in 2025.

All of the team's home games this season were played at the Lamitan Capitol Gymnasium in Lamitan.

== Regular season ==
=== Standings ===
Pos	Team	Pld	W	L	PCT	GB	Qualification
1	Davao Occidental Tigers	30	26	4	.867	—	Playoffs
2	Bacoor City Strikers	30	24	6	.800	2	Playoffs
3	Basilan Steel	30	20	10	.667	6	Playoffs
4	Batangas City Athletics	30	19	11	.633	7	Playoffs
5	Zamboanga Family's Brand Sardines	30	18	12	.600 (Note: Zamboanga (1.071), Iloilo (0.976), and General Santos (0.960) are ranked based on head-to-head point quotient.)	8	Playoffs

Source: Standings
Rules for classification: 1) Wins; 2a) If two teams are tied, head-to-head match-up; 2b) If three or more teams are tied, head-to-head point quotient; 3) overall point quotient; 4) coin toss.

=== Schedule ===
2019–20 Basilan Steel season schedule
Game	Date	Opponent	Score	Location	Record	Recap
1	June 12	Bicol	W 94–83	SM Mall of Asia Arena	1–0	
2	June 26	Pampanga	W 83–74	Valenzuela Astrodome	2–0	
3	July 2	Bulacan	L 55–65	Bulacan Capitol Gymnasium	2–1	
4	July 9	Marikina	W 86–83	San Andres Sports Complex	3–1	
5	July 16	Batangas City	L 89–101	Valenzuela Astrodome	3–2	
6	July 19	Biñan City	L 78–94	Alonte Sports Arena	3–3	
7	July 24	Valenzuela	W 87–78	Bulacan Capitol Gymnasium	4–3	
8	August 2	Iloilo	W 78–74	Pasig Sports Center	5–3	
9	August 8	Mindoro	W 105–89	Caloocan Sports Complex	6–3	
10	August 15	Makati	L 80–86	Caloocan Sports Complex	6–4	
11	August 20	Navotas	W 113–94	Batangas City Coliseum	7–4	
12	September 2	Muntinlupa	W 90–79	Filoil Flying V Centre	8–4	
13	September 13	San Juan	L 86–89	Olivarez College	8–5	
14	September 17	Imus	W 98–85	Angeles University Foundation	9–5	
15	September 21	Davao Occidental	L 71–76	La Salle Coliseum	9–6	
16	October 2	Manila	L 65–66	Valenzuela Astrodome	9–7	
17	October 5	Zamboanga	L 78–83	Rizal Memorial Colleges	9–8	
18	October 9	Caloocan	W 82–70	Olivarez College	10–8	
19	October 23	Bacoor City	W 92–90	Strike Gymnasium	11–8	
20	October 30	Quezon City	W 86–78	Bulacan Capitol Gymnasium	12–8	
21	November 16	Nueva Ecija	W 93–81	Lamitan Capitol Gymnasium	13–8	
22	November 28	General Santos	W 85–79	Lagao Gymnasium	14–8	
23	December 14	Sarangani	W 85–80	Santa Rosa Sports Complex	15–8	
24	December 19	Bataan	L 83–91	Bataan People's Center	15–9	
25	January 7	Pasig	W 89–83	Bulacan Capitol Gymnasium	16–9	
26	January 11	Bacolod	L 89–96	Filoil Flying V Centre	16–10	
27	January 14	Cebu	W 86–78	San Andres Sports Complex	17–10	
28	January 27	Rizal	W 103–85	Ynares Center	18–10	
29	January 31	Pasay	W 74–59	Cuneta Astrodome	19–10	
30	February 7	Parañaque	W 89–71	Marikina Sports Center	20–10	
Source: Schedule

== Playoffs ==
=== Schedule ===
2020 Basilan Steel playoffs schedule
Round	Game	Date	Opponent	Score	Location	Series	Recap
Division Quarterfinals	1	February 19	Iloilo	W 83–68	Strike Gymnasium	1–0	
Division Quarterfinals	2	February 24	Iloilo	W 70–63	Lamitan Capitol Gymnasium	2–0	
Division Semifinals	1	March 2	Bacoor City	W 77–63	Davao City Recreation Center	1–0	
Division Semifinals	2	March 5	Bacoor City	L 69–80	Strike Gymnasium	1–1	
Division Semifinals	3	March 7	Bacoor City	W 84–76	Strike Gymnasium	2–1	
Division finals	1	March 9	Davao Occidental	W 74–72	Davao del Norte Sports Complex	1–0	
Division finals	2	March 11	Davao Occidental	L 76–81	Lamitan Capitol Gymnasium	1–1	
Division finals	3	March 17 (Note: Postponed to 2021 due to the COVID-19 pandemic.)	Davao Occidental	L by default (Note: Originally, scheduled for March 17, 2021, Davao Occidental won the game by default due to multiple Basilan Steel members being tested positive for COVID-19.)	Subic Bay Gymnasium	1–2	
Source: Schedule
