= 2019–20 San Juan Knights season =

- Division champions
- Head coach: Randy Alcantara

Results
- Record: 26–4 (.867)
- Place: Division: 1st (North)
- Playoff finish: National finals (lost vs. Davao Occidental, 1–3)

San Juan Knights seasons

The 2019–20 San Juan Knights season was the second season of the franchise in the Maharlika Pilipinas Basketball League (MPBL).

The Knights entered the season as defending champions, and continuing their winning traditions by going undefeated in their first ten games. Eventually, they would clinch the top seed in the North Division with a record of 26–4. The twenty-six regular season wins is a record for most regular season wins in a single season, a record San Juan shares with the Davao Occidental Tigers this season and the Pampanga Giant Lanterns in 2023 and 2024.

The Knights began their playoff campaign with back-to-back sweeps against the Pasay Voyagers and Pampanga Giant Lanterns before meeting in the division finals against the Makati Super Crunch. The series was tied at 1–1 before the COVID-19 pandemic suspended the season for one year. Once play resumed in 2021, San Juan would beat Makati by a 77-point lead to advance to the national finals against the rival Davao Occidental Tigers in a rematch of last season's series. Unfortunately for the Knights, they would lose the series this time around in four games, ending their title defense.

The team played all of their home games this season at the Filoil Flying V Centre.

== Regular season ==
=== Standings ===
Pos	Team	Pld	W	L	PCT	GB	Qualification
1	San Juan Knights	30	26	4	.867	—	Playoffs
2	Manila Stars	30	25	5	.833	1	Playoffs
3	Makati Super Crunch	30	22	8	.733	4	Playoffs
4	Pampanga Giant Lanterns	30	21	9	.700	5	Playoffs
5	Bataan Risers	30	20	10	.667	6	Playoffs

Source: Standings
Rules for classification: 1) Wins; 2a) If two teams are tied, head-to-head match-up; 2b) If three or more teams are tied, head-to-head point quotient; 3) overall point quotient; 4) coin toss.

=== Schedule ===
2019–20 San Juan Knights season schedule
Game	Date	Opponent	Score	Location	Record	Recap
1	June 14	Bacoor City	W 77–76	Strike Gymnasium	1–0	
2	June 28	Pasay	W 74–72	Filoil Flying V Centre	2–0	
3	July 4	Rizal	W 101–86	San Andres Sports Complex	3–0	
4	July 10	Bacolod	W 95–71	Olivarez College	4–0	
5	July 18	Sarangani	W 100–77	Batangas City Coliseum	5–0	
6	July 23	Parañaque	W 81–65	Caloocan Sports Complex	6–0	
7	July 27	Bataan	W 87–79	Ibalong Centrum for Recreation	7–0	
8	August 5	Quezon City	W 89–71	Filoil Flying V Centre	8–0	
9	August 12	Nueva Ecija	W 109–95	Filoil Flying V Centre	9–0	
10	August 19	Cebu	W 88–69	Cuneta Astrodome	10–0	
11	August 23	General Santos	L 91–97	Muntinlupa Sports Complex	10–1	
12	September 2	Marikina	W 87–73	Filoil Flying V Centre	11–1	
13	September 13	Basilan	W 89–86	Olivarez College	12–1	
14	September 17	Pampanga	W 102–97	Angeles University Foundation	13–1	
15	September 23	Bulacan	W 90–88	Filoil Flying V Centre	14–1	
16	October 1	Bicol	W 98–69	Muntinlupa Sports Complex	15–1	
17	October 7	Batangas City	L 88–93	Batangas State University	15–2	
18	October 15	Valenzuela	W 78–68	Caloocan Sports Complex	16–2	
19	October 21	Muntinlupa	W 91–63	Filoil Flying V Centre	17–2	
20	November 5	Biñan City	W 89–84	Alonte Sports Arena	18–2	
21	November 9	Imus	W 97–68	Batangas City Coliseum	19–2	
22	November 25	Makati	W 88–86	Makati Coliseum	20–2	
23	November 29	Manila	L 70–75	El Salvador City Gymnasium	20–3	
24	January 6	Navotas	W 112–95	San Andres Sports Complex	21–3	
25	January 11	Pasig	W 109–99	Filoil Flying V Centre	22–3	
26	January 18	Davao Occidental	W 84–65	University of Southeastern Philippines	23–3	
27	January 23	Iloilo	W 70–67	Ynares Sports Arena	24–3	
28	January 31	Zamboanga	L 64–69	Cuneta Astrodome	24–4	
29	February 4	Caloocan	W 111–88	Cuneta Astrodome	25–4	
30	February 8	Mindoro	W 114–68	Valenzuela Astrodome	26–4	
Source: Schedule

== Playoffs ==
=== Schedule ===
2020 San Juan Knights playoffs schedule
Round	Game	Date	Opponent	Score	Location	Series	Recap
Division quarterfinals	1	February 15	Pasay	W 75–74	Filoil Flying V Centre	1–0	
Division quarterfinals	2	February 20	Pasay	W 74–67	Angeles University Foundation	2–0	
Division semifinals	1	February 28	Pampanga	W 86–84	Filoil Flying V Centre	1–0	
Division semifinals	2	March 4	Pampanga	W 91–83	San Andres Sports Complex	2–0	
Division finals	1	March 9	Makati	W 76–60	Filoil Flying V Centre	1–0	
Division finals	2	March 11	Makati	L 88–91	Filoil Flying V Centre (Note: Game 2 of the North Division finals was moved from its original venue (Makati Coliseum) due to the impending COVID-19 pandemic. The game was also played behind closed doors.)	1–1	
Division finals	3	March 10 (Note: Postponed to 2021 due to the COVID-19 pandemic.)	Makati	W 131–54	Subic Bay Gymnasium	2–1	
National finals	1	March 17	Davao Occidental	L 75–77	Subic Bay Gymnasium	0–1	
National finals	2	March 18	Davao Occidental	W 70–65	Subic Bay Gymnasium	1–1	
National finals	3	March 20	Davao Occidental	L 58–66	Subic Bay Gymnasium	1–2	
National finals	4	March 21	Davao Occidental	L 88–89	Subic Bay Gymnasium	1–3	
Source: Schedule
