= 2019–20 GenSan Warriors season =

Results
- Record: 18–12 (.600)
- Place: Division: 7th (South)
- Playoff finish: Division Quarterfinals (lost vs. Bacoor City, 0–2)

GenSan Warriors seasons

The 2019–20 GenSan Warriors season was the second season of the franchise in the Maharlika Pilipinas Basketball League (MPBL).

General Santos went off to a hot start to the season by going 10–2 through the first twelve games, which included an eight-game winning streak. Despite that, the Warriors only managed to win eight of the remaining eighteen games, finishing with an 18–12 record and the seventh seed in the South Division. They would then be swept by the Bacoor City Strikers in the Division Quarterfinals.

The team only hosted one home game this season, which took place at the Lagao Gymnasium on November 28.

== Regular season ==
=== Standings ===
Pos	Team	Pld	W	L	PCT	GB	Qualification
5	Zamboanga Family's Brand Sardines	30	18	12	.600 (Note: Zamboanga (1.071), Iloilo (0.976), and General Santos (0.960) are ranked based on head-to-head point quotient.)	8	Playoffs
6	Iloilo United Royals	30	18	12	.600	8	Playoffs
7	GenSan Warriors	30	18	12	.600	8	Playoffs
8	Bicol Volcanoes	30	16	14	.533	10	Playoffs
9	Cebu Casino Ethyl Alcohol	30	15	15	.500	11	

Source: Standings
Rules for classification: 1) Wins; 2a) If two teams are tied, head-to-head match-up; 2b) If three or more teams are tied, head-to-head point quotient; 3) overall point quotient; 4) coin toss.

=== Schedule ===
2019–20 GenSan Warriors season schedule
Game	Date	Opponent	Score	Location	Record	Recap
1	June 13	Pampanga		Caloocan Sports Complex	0–1	
2	June 20	Bulacan		Bulacan Capitol Gymnasium	1–1	
3	June 25	Marikina		Navotas Sports Complex	2–1	
4	July 4	Manila		San Andres Sports Complex	2–2	
5	July 9	Biñan City		San Andres Sports Complex	3–2	
6	July 15	Valenzuela		Valenzuela Astrodome	4–2	
7	July 20	Iloilo		Cuneta Astrodome	5–2	
8	July 29	Mindoro		Navotas Sports Complex	6–2	
9	August 12	Navotas		Filoil Flying V Centre	7–2	
10	August 17	Muntinlupa		Baliwag Star Arena	8–2	
11	August 23	San Juan		Muntinlupa Sports Complex	9–2	
12	August 31	Imus		Mayor Vitaliano D. Agan Coliseum	10–2	
13	September 7	Caloocan		Albay Astrodome	10–3	
14	September 13	Davao Occidental		Olivarez College	10–4	
15	September 18	Pasig		San Andres Sports Complex	11–4	
16	September 25	Zamboanga		Caloocan Sports Complex	11–5	
17	October 5	Parañaque		Rizal Memorial Colleges	12–5	
18	October 9	Rizal		Olivarez College	13–5	
19	October 16	Batangas City		Batangas City Coliseum	13–6	
20	October 22	Quezon City		Batangas City Coliseum	14–6	
21	November 12	Bacolod		Marikina Sports Center	15–6	
22	November 28	Basilan		Lagao Gymnasium	15–7	
23	December 21	Cebu		Southwestern University	15–8	
24	January 8	Pasay		Cuneta Astrodome	16–8	
25	January 20	Bacoor City		Strike Gymnasium	16–9	
26	January 24	Bataan		Bataan People's Center	16–10	
27	February 1	Bicol		Angeles University Foundation	16–11	
28	February 6	Makati		Alonte Sports Arena	16–12	
29	February 10	Sarangani		San Andres Sports Complex	17–12	
30	February 12	Nueva Ecija		Caloocan Sports Complex	18–12	
Source: Schedule

== Playoffs ==
=== Schedule ===
2020 GenSan Warriors playoffs schedule
Round	Game	Date	Opponent	Score	Location	Series	Recap
Division Quarterfinals	1	February 19	Bacoor City		Strike Gymnasium	0–1	Recap
Division Quarterfinals	2	February 24	Bacoor City		Lamitan Capitol Gymnasium	0–2	Recap
Source: Schedule
