= 2019–20 Sarangani Marlins season =

Results
- Record: 1–29 (.033)
- Place: Division: 15th (South)

Sarangani Marlins seasons

The 2019–20 Sarangani Marlins season was the inaugural season of the franchise in the Maharlika Pilipinas Basketball League (MPBL).

Starting out as the Soccsksargen Marlins, the team finished the season with just one win in the 30-game season. It is the first one-win season since the league's national expansion and just the second ever. By winning percentage, it is also the worst season by any team in a single season. The team has also been the subject of a game-fixing scandal after going 0–18.

From July 12 to November 20, 2019, the Marlins lost 21 straight games, which was the longest losing streak in league history at the time, both single-season and overall. These both stood until 2024, when the Bicolandia Oragons lost 23 straight games across two seasons. In addition, the 2024 Bacolod City of Smiles would lose 22 straight games in a single season.

The team's only home game this season was held at the Sarangani Capitol Gymnasium in Alabel, which is also where they claimed their lone victory as well.

== Regular season ==
=== Standings ===
Pos	Team	Pld	W	L	PCT	GB
11	Bacolod Master Sardines	30	11	19	.367	15
12	Mindoro Tamaraws	30	9	21	.300	17
13	Muntinlupa Cagers	30	7	23	.233	19
14	Imus Bandera	30	6	24	.200	20
15	Sarangani Marlins	30	1	29	.033	25

Source: Standings
Rules for classification: 1) Wins; 2a) If two teams are tied, head-to-head match-up; 2b) If three or more teams are tied, head-to-head point quotient; 3) overall point quotient; 4) coin toss.

=== Schedule ===
2019–20 Sarangani Marlins season schedule
Game	Date	Opponent	Score	Location	Record	Recap
1	July 12	Muntinlupa	L 55–58	Caloocan Sports Complex	0–1	
2	July 18	San Juan	L 77–100	Batangas City Coliseum	0–2	
3	July 20	Imus	L 70–82	Cuneta Astrodome	0–3	
4	July 24	Bacoor City	L 60–65	Bulacan Capitol Gymnasium	0–4	
5	July 29	Davao Occidental	L 75–104	Navotas Sports Complex	0–5	
6	August 2	Pasig	L 77–89	Pasig Sports Center	0–6	
7	August 7	Zamboanga	L 75–100	Bulacan Capitol Gymnasium	0–7	
8	August 15	Caloocan	L 77–93	Caloocan Sports Complex	0–8	
9	August 23	Mindoro	L 87–91	Muntinlupa Sports Complex	0–9	
10	August 27	Makati	L 70–106	Strike Gymnasium	0–10	
11	August 29	Pasay	L 54–70	Cuneta Astrodome	0–11	
12	September 5	Navotas	L 82–88	Angeles University Foundation	0–12	
13	September 12	Batangas City	L 54–76	Batangas City Coliseum	0–13	
14	September 21	Bacolod	L 80–89	La Salle Coliseum	0–14	
15	October 4	Cebu	L 57–89	Strike Gymnasium	0–15	
16	October 10	Nueva Ecija	L 50–89	Strike Gymnasium	0–16	
17	October 16	Bataan	L 71–102	Batangas City Coliseum	0–17	
18	October 23	Manila	L 89–104	Strike Gymnasium	0–18	
19	November 5	Pampanga	L 71–115	Alonte Sports Arena	0–19	
20	November 8	Parañaque	L 70–73	Olivarez College	0–20	
21	November 20	Rizal	L 73–77	Bataan People's Center	0–21	
22	November 27	Quezon City	W 78–74	Sarangani Capitol Gymnasium	1–21	
23	December 14	Basilan	L 80–85	Santa Rosa Sports Complex	1–22	
24	December 20	Valenzuela	L 84–89	San Andres Sports Complex	1–23	
25	January 7	Bulacan	L 69–76	Bulacan Capitol Gymnasium	1–24	
26	January 10	Biñan City	L 74–92	Alonte Sports Arena	1–25	
27	January 21	Bicol	L 72–86	Alonte Sports Arena	1–26	
28	January 30	Iloilo	L 86–96	Bulacan Capitol Gymnasium	1–27	
29	February 7	Marikina	L 95–99	Marikina Sports Center	1–28	
30	February 10	General Santos	L 87–104	San Andres Sports Complex	1–29	
Source: Schedule

== Game-fixing scandal ==
On November 4, 2019, the league suspended the Marlins team over game-fixing allegations. League founder and then-Senator Manny Pacquiao ensured that the persons involved in the scandal would face appropriate charges and reminded other teams that the league has zero tolerance towards "any form of cheating and other unsportsmanlike behavior."

A week later, league commissioner Kenneth Duremdes, who was assisted by the National Bureau of Investigation, then filed criminal complaints to 21 persons involved in the scandal, which included three Chinese nationals and ten Marlins players before the Department of Justice. On April 16, 2021, the DOJ would indict 17 persons with criminal charges.
