= 2019–20 Makati Super Crunch season =

- Head coach: Pocholo Villanueva; Beaujing Acot

Results
- Record: 22–8 (.733)
- Place: Division: 3rd (North)
- Playoff finish: Division Finals (lost vs. San Juan, 1–2)

Makati Super Crunch seasons

The 2019–20 Makati Super Crunch season was the second season of the franchise in the Maharlika Pilipinas Basketball League (MPBL).

The Super Crunch looked to continue their North Division contention after a disappointing upset loss to the Quezon City Capitals in the previous season's playoffs. Makati started the season 9–1 and went on an eight-game winning streak from September 23 to November 18. Despite losing four of their last six games, the Super Crunch still managed to finish third place in the North Division with a 22–8 record.

In the playoffs, Makati got past Bulacan and second-seeded Manila before clashing against the San Juan Knights in the North Division Finals. Although Makati was able to tie the series right before the season's suspension, the pandemic would ultimately affect the team's chances at advancing to the Finals. Financial troubles caused the team to only field a five-man roster in the deciding game 3, and in the game itself, the team lost to San Juan by 77 points, ending their season in an abrupt fallout.

As of 2023, this is the only season in which the team played their home games within Makati proper, playing at the Makati Coliseum for two games.

== Regular season ==
=== Standings ===
Pos	Team	Pld	W	L	PCT	GB	Qualification
1	San Juan Knights	30	26	4	.867	—	Playoffs
2	Manila Stars	30	25	5	.833	1	Playoffs
3	Makati Super Crunch	30	22	8	.733	4	Playoffs
4	Pampanga Giant Lanterns	30	21	9	.700	5	Playoffs
5	Bataan Risers	30	20	10	.667	6	Playoffs

Source: Standings
Rules for classification: 1) Wins; 2a) If two teams are tied, head-to-head match-up; 2b) If three or more teams are tied, head-to-head point quotient; 3) overall point quotient; 4) coin toss.

=== Schedule ===
2019–20 Makati Super Crunch season schedule
Game	Date	Opponent	Score	Location	Record	Recap
1	June 18	Rizal	W 73–51	Ynares Center	1–0	
2	June 28	Bacolod	W 84–74	Filoil Flying V Centre	2–0	
3	July 5	Parañaque	W 91–71	San Andres Sports Complex	3–0	
4	July 12	Bataan	W 76–69	Caloocan Sports Complex	4–0	
5	July 16	Quezon City	L 85–91	Blue Eagle Gym	4–1	
6	July 30	Cebu	W 73–67	Muntinlupa Sports Complex	5–1	
7	August 8	Bicol	W 83–75	Caloocan Sports Complex	6–1	
8	August 15	Basilan	W 86–80	Caloocan Sports Complex	7–1	
9	August 21	Pampanga	W 96–94	JCSGO Christian Academy	8–1	
10	August 27	Sarangani	W 106–70	Strike Gymnasium	9–1	
11	September 2	Bulacan	L 74–76	Filoil Flying V Centre	9–2	
12	September 10	Marikina	W 85–70	Cuneta Astrodome	10–2	
13	September 14	Manila	L 56–64	Bataan People's Center	10–3	
14	September 23	Biñan City	W 92–87	Filoil Flying V Centre	11–3	
15	October 2	Valenzuela	W 78–61	Valenzuela Astrodome	12–3	
16	October 8	Pasig	W 101–87	Valenzuela Astrodome	13–3	
17	October 16	Mindoro	W 97–65	Batangas City Coliseum	14–3	
18	October 24	Iloilo	W 78–71	Marist School	15–3	
19	November 5	Imus	W 69–64	Alonte Sports Arena	16–3	
20	November 13	Zamboanga	W 111–106	Ynares Center	17–3	
21	November 18	Muntinlupa	W 81–68	Makati Coliseum	18–3	
22	November 25	San Juan	L 86–88	Makati Coliseum	18–4	
23	November 28	Batangas City	W 94–89	Lagao Gymnasium	19–4	
24	December 13	Navotas	W 67–62	Caloocan Sports Complex	20–4	
25	December 21	Bacoor City	L 63–86	Southwestern University	20–5	
26	January 14	Davao Occidental	L 79–101	San Andres Sports Complex	20–6	
27	January 22	Caloocan	W 119–77	San Andres Sports Complex	21–6	
28	January 28	Pasay	L 61–79	Cuneta Astrodome	21–7	
29	February 1	Nueva Ecija	L 74–80	Angeles University Foundation	21–8	
30	February 6	General Santos	W 91–90	Alonte Sports Arena	22–8	
Source: Schedule

== Playoffs ==
=== Schedule ===
2020 Makati Super Crunch playoffs schedule
Round	Game	Date	Opponent	Score	Location	Series	Recap
Division Quarterfinals	1	February 18	Bulacan	W 94–88	San Andres Sports Complex	1–0	
Division Quarterfinals	2	February 22	Bulacan	W 86–78	Malolos Sports and Convention Center	2–0	
Division Semifinals	1	February 28	Manila	L 74–77	Filoil Flying V Centre	0–1	
Division Semifinals	2	March 4	Manila	W 75–59	San Andres Sports Complex	1–1	
Division Semifinals	3	March 6	Manila	W 78–75	San Andres Sports Complex	2–1	
Division Finals	1	March 9	San Juan	L 60–76	Filoil Flying V Centre	0–1	
Division Finals	2	March 11	San Juan	W 91–88	Filoil Flying V Centre (Note: Game 2 of the North Division Finals was moved from its original venue (Makati Coliseum) due to the impending COVID-19 pandemic. The game was also played behind closed doors.)	1–1	
Division Finals	3	March 10 (Note: Postponed to 2021 due to the COVID-19 pandemic.)	San Juan	L 54–131	Subic Bay Gymnasium	1–2	
Source: Schedule

== Fallout ==
The COVID-19 pandemic would heavily affect Makati's chances at a championship. When game 3 of the series pushed through, the Super Crunch were only able to field a five-man roster against San Juan. This was due to financial troubles during the pandemic affecting the team, and that, allegedly, team management wouldn't be able to pay the contracts of the team's key players. Those players were given the choice of whether or not they would participate in the deciding game 3, but none of them responded. The Makati Super Crunch would go on to lose to the San Juan Knights by a score of 54–131.
