= 2019–20 Bulacan Kuyas season =

- Head coach: Britt Reroma; Kerwin McCoy

Results
- Record: 19–11 (.633)
- Place: Division: 6th (North)
- Playoff finish: Division Quarterfinals (lost vs. Makati, 0–2)

Bulacan Kuyas seasons

The 2019–20 Bulacan Kuyas season was the third season of the franchise in the Maharlika Pilipinas Basketball League (MPBL).

After starting the season 5–5, the Kuyas then won thirteen of the next sixteen games to bring them up to 18–8. Their 17th win on January 10 surpassed their previous 14–11 campaign in winning percentage. Bulacan would enter the playoffs for the third straight season after finishing sixth in the North Division with a 19–11 record, making it their winningest season to date. They would be swept by the Makati Super Crunch in the Division Quarterfinals.

The team played most of their home games at the Bulacan Capitol Gymnasium in Malolos, with one game played at Baliwag Star Arena in Baliwag. During the playoffs, concerns regarding the Makati Coliseum caused game 2 of the Division Quarterfinals to be moved to Malolos Sports and Convention Center.

== Regular season ==
=== Standings ===
Pos	Team	Pld	W	L	PCT	GB	Qualification
4	Pampanga Giant Lanterns	30	21	9	.700	5	Playoffs
5	Bataan Risers	30	20	10	.667	6	Playoffs
6	Bulacan Kuyas	30	19	11	.633	7	Playoffs
7	Pasig Sta. Lucia Realtors	30	18	12	.600	8	Playoffs
8	Pasay Voyagers	30	17	13	.567	9	Playoffs

Source: Standings
Rules for classification: 1) Wins; 2a) If two teams are tied, head-to-head match-up; 2b) If three or more teams are tied, head-to-head point quotient; 3) overall point quotient; 4) coin toss.

=== Schedule ===
2019–20 Bulacan Kuyas season schedule
Game	Date	Opponent	Score	Location	Record	Recap
1	June 14	Cebu	W 75–71	Strike Gymnasium	1–0	
2	June 20	General Santos	L 77–81	Bulacan Capitol Gymnasium	1–1	
3	June 27	Bicol	W 83–81	Strike Gymnasium	2–1	
4	July 2	Basilan	W 65–55	Bulacan Capitol Gymnasium	3–1	
5	July 6	Pampanga	L 63–69	Angeles University Foundation	3–2	
6	July 11	Zamboanga	L 59–60	Blue Eagle Gym	3–3	
7	July 24	Manila	L 72–93	Bulacan Capitol Gymnasium	3–4	
8	July 31	Biñan City	W 87–82	Angeles University Foundation	4–4	
9	August 7	Valenzuela	W 97–79	Bulacan Capitol Gymnasium	5–4	
10	August 14	Iloilo	L 73–83	Angeles University Foundation	5–5	
11	August 17	Mindoro	W 74–69	Baliwag Star Area	6–5	
12	September 2	Makati	W 76–74	Filoil Flying V Centre	7–5	
13	September 10	Navotas	W 105–104	Cuneta Astrodome	8–5	
14	September 16	Muntinlupa	W 77–62	Bulacan Capitol Gymnasium	9–5	
15	September 23	San Juan	L 88–90	Filoil Flying V Centre	9–6	
16	October 7	Davao Occidental	L 75–91	Batangas State University	9–7	
17	October 14	Imus	W 75–70	Imus City Sports Complex	10–7	
18	October 26	Rizal	W 75–61	Rizal Memorial Colleges	11–7	
19	October 30	Marikina	W 81–79	Bulacan Capitol Gymnasium	12–7	
20	November 8	Pasig	L 72–77	Olivarez College	12–8	
21	November 14	Pasay	W 100–98	Bulacan Capitol Gymnasium	13–8	
22	November 25	Bataan	W 81–79	Makati Coliseum	14–8	
23	December 18	Batangas City	W 82–81	Olivarez College	15–8	
24	January 7	Sarangani	W 76–69	Bulacan Capitol Gymnasium	16–8	
25	January 10	Parañaque	W 76–69	Alonte Sports Arena	17–8	
26	January 16	Caloocan	W 81–79	Angeles University Foundation	18–8	
27	January 22	Nueva Ecija	L 78–85	San Andres Sports Complex	18–9	
28	January 28	Bacoor City	L 76–78	Cuneta Astrodome	18–10	
29	January 30	Quezon City	W 78–70	Malolos Sports and Convention Center	19–10	
30	February 7	Bacolod	L 69–76	Marikina Sports Center	19–11	
Source: Schedule

== Playoffs ==
=== Schedule ===
2020 Bulacan Kuyas playoffs schedule
Round	Game	Date	Opponent	Score	Location	Series	Recap
Division Quarterfinals	1	February 18	Makati	L 88–94	San Andres Sports Complex	0–1	Recap
Division Quarterfinals	2	February 22	Makati	L 78–86	Malolos Sports and Convention Center	0–2	Recap
Source: Schedule
