= 2019–20 Manila Stars season =

- Head coach: Tino Pinat

Results
- Record: 25–5 (.833)
- Place: Division: 2nd (North)
- Playoff finish: Division Semifinals (lost vs. Makati, 1–2)

Manila Stars seasons

The 2019–20 Manila Stars season was the second season of the franchise in the Maharlika Pilipinas Basketball League (MPBL).

Coming off a Division Finals appearance in the previous season, the Stars began their 2019–20 campaign with a 9–1 record in their first ten games, which included a seven-game winning streak from July 4 to August 19. They would go on to conclude the season going 8–1 in their last nine games, finishing with a 25–5 record and the second seed in the North Division. By both wins and winning percentage, this would be their best season in both aspects as of 2023.

Manila kicked off their playoff run with a sweep against the Pasig Sta. Lucia Realtors before taking on the Makati Super Crunch in the Division Semifinals. Despite winning game 1 of the series, Manila would lose the next two games, including the deciding game 3 in overtime, thus ending their run.

The team played all of their home games this season at San Andres Sports Complex.

== Regular season ==
=== Standings ===
Pos	Team	Pld	W	L	PCT	GB	Qualification
1	San Juan Knights	30	26	4	.867	—	Playoffs
2	Manila Stars	30	25	5	.833	1	Playoffs
3	Makati Super Crunch	30	22	8	.733	4	Playoffs
4	Pampanga Giant Lanterns	30	21	9	.700	5	Playoffs
5	Bataan Risers	30	20	10	.667	6	Playoffs

Source: Standings
Rules for classification: 1) Wins; 2a) If two teams are tied, head-to-head match-up; 2b) If three or more teams are tied, head-to-head point quotient; 3) overall point quotient; 4) coin toss.

=== Schedule ===
2019–20 Manila Stars season schedule
Game	Date	Opponent	Score	Location	Record	Recap
1	June 18	Quezon City	W 86–85	Ynares Center	1–0	
2	June 24	Nueva Ecija	W 96–86	San Andres Sports Complex	2–0	
3	June 29	Cebu	L 86–91	San Andres Sports Complex	2–1	
4	July 4	General Santos	W 79–72	San Andres Sports Complex	3–1	
5	July 9	Batangas City	W 73–50	San Andres Sports Complex	4–1	
6	July 19	Pampanga	W 92–76	Alonte Sports Arena	5–1	
7	July 24	Bulacan	W 93–72	Bulacan Capitol Gymnasium	6–1	
8	July 31	Marikina	W 107–95	Angeles University Foundation	7–1	
9	August 14	Biñan City	W 106–93	Angeles University Foundation	8–1	
10	August 19	Valenzuela	W 71–66	Cuneta Astrodome	9–1	
11	August 26	Iloilo	L 85–88	San Andres Sports Complex	9–2	
12	September 7	Bicol	W 76–73	Albay Astrodome	10–2	
13	September 14	Makati	W 64–56	Bataan People's Center	11–2	
14	September 18	Navotas	W 96–91	San Andres Sports Complex	12–2	
15	October 2	Basilan	W 66–65	Valenzuela Astrodome	13–2	
16	October 15	Caloocan	L 65–72	Caloocan Sports Complex	13–3	
17	October 19	Pasay	W 73–72	Ibalong Centrum for Recreation	14–3	
18	October 23	Sarangani	W 104–89	Strike Gymnasium	15–3	
19	November 4	Pasig	W 69–56	Ynares Center	16–3	
20	November 16	Imus	W 85–58	Lamitan Capitol Gymnasium	17–3	
21	November 23	Davao Occidental	L 76–79	Davao City Recreation Center	17–4	
22	November 29	San Juan	W 75–70	El Salvador City Gymnasium	18–4	
23	December 13	Muntinlupa	W 76–57	Caloocan Sports Complex	19–4	
24	December 20	Bacolod	W 87–70	San Andres Sports Complex	20–4	
25	January 6	Rizal	W 116–89	San Andres Sports Complex	21–4	
26	January 9	Bataan	L 76–77	Angeles University Foundation	21–5	
27	January 14	Parañaque	W 106–78	San Andres Sports Complex	22–5	
28	January 20	Mindoro	W 133–101	Strike Gymnasium	23–5	
29	February 3	Bacoor City	W 78–74	Strike Gymnasium	24–5	
30	February 10	Zamboanga	W 74–71	San Andres Sports Complex	25–5	
Source: Schedule

== Playoffs ==
=== Schedule ===
2020 Manila Stars playoffs schedule
Round	Game	Date	Opponent	Score	Location	Series	Recap
Division Quarterfinals	1	February 18	Pasig	W 91–88	San Andres Sports Complex	1–0	Recap
Division Quarterfinals	2	February 22	Pasig	W 82–80	Malolos Sports and Convention Center	2–0	Recap
Division Semifinals	1	February 28	Makati	W 77–74	Filoil Flying V Centre	1–0	Recap
Division Semifinals	2	March 4	Makati	L 59–75	San Andres Sports Complex	1–1	Recap
Division Semifinals	3	March 6	Makati	L 75–78	San Andres Sports Complex	1–2	Recap
Source: Schedule
