= 2019–20 Bacoor City Strikers season =

Results
- Record: 24–6 (.800)
- Place: Division: 2nd (South)
- Playoff finish: Division Semifinals (lost vs. Basilan, 1–2)

Bacoor City Strikers seasons

The 2019–20 Bacoor City Strikers season was the second season of the franchise in the Maharlika Pilipinas Basketball League (MPBL).

After a run to the Division Semifinals in the previous season, Bacoor City began their season by going 6–1 in their first seven games. On November 8, the team would surpass their previous 13–12 record by winning percentage with their 16th win. They won nine of the last ten games, which included an eight-game winning streak from November 8 to January 28, to finish the regular season as the second seed in the South Division with a 24–6 record.

They first swept the GenSan Warriors in the Division Quarterfinals before meeting the Basilan Steel in the Division Semifinals. The Strikers would lose to the Steel in three games.

The team played all of their home games at Strike Gymnasium.

== Regular season ==
=== Standings ===
Pos	Team	Pld	W	L	PCT	GB	Qualification
1	Davao Occidental Tigers	30	26	4	.867	—	Playoffs
2	Bacoor City Strikers	30	24	6	.800	2	Playoffs
3	Basilan Steel	30	20	10	.667	6	Playoffs
4	Batangas City Athletics	30	19	11	.633	7	Playoffs
5	Zamboanga Family's Brand Sardines	30	18	12	.600 (Note: Zamboanga (1.071), Iloilo (0.976), and General Santos (0.960) are ranked based on head-to-head point quotient.)	8	Playoffs

Source: Standings
Rules for classification: 1) Wins; 2a) If two teams are tied, head-to-head match-up; 2b) If three or more teams are tied, head-to-head point quotient; 3) overall point quotient; 4) coin toss.

=== Schedule ===
2019–20 Bacoor City Strikers season schedule
Game	Date	Opponent	Score	Location	Record	Recap
1	June 14	San Juan	L 76–77	Strike Gymnasium	0–1	
2	June 20	Imus	W 79–57	Bulacan Capitol Gymnasium	1–1	
3	June 27	Davao Occidental	W 73–70	Strike Gymnasium	2–1	
4	July 3	Pasig	W 73–64	Pasig Sports Center	3–1	
5	July 8	Zamboanga	W 83–75	Cuneta Astrodome	4–1	
6	July 12	Caloocan	W 95–94	Caloocan Sports Complex	5–1	
7	July 24	Sarangani	W 65–60	Bulacan Capitol Gymnasium	6–1	
8	August 1	Pasay	L 78–83	Cuneta Astrodome	6–2	
9	August 6	Rizal	W 87–84	Ynares Sports Arena	7–2	
10	August 13	Bacolod	W 107–100	Strike Gymnasium	8–2	
11	August 20	Batangas City	L 67–68	Batangas City Coliseum	8–3	
12	August 27	Parañaque	W 109–56	Strike Gymnasium	9–3	
13	September 4	Bataan	W 93–66	Bataan People's Center	10–3	
14	September 11	Bicol	W 84–80	Strike Gymnasium	11–3	
15	September 16	Quezon City	W 111–79	Bulacan Capitol Gymnasium	12–3	
16	September 24	Nueva Ecija	W 90–80	Marist School	13–3	
17	October 4	Biñan City	W 78–70	Strike Gymnasium	14–3	
18	October 10	Cebu	W 88–71	Strike Gymnasium	15–3	
19	October 17	Pampanga	L 69–76	La Salle Coliseum	15–4	
20	October 23	Basilan	L 90–92	Strike Gymnasium	15–5	
21	November 8	Navotas	W 87–78	Olivarez College	16–5	
22	November 14	Mindoro	W 76–59	Bulacan Capitol Gymnasium	17–5	
23	November 19	Valenzuela	W 78–74	Alonte Sports Arena	18–5	
24	December 21	Makati	W 86–63	Southwestern University	19–5	
25	January 8	Marikina	W 100–88	Cuneta Astrodome	20–5	
26	January 11	Muntinlupa	W 98–67	Filoil Flying V Centre	21–5	
27	January 20	General Santos	W 87–75	Strike Gymnasium	22–5	
28	January 28	Bulacan	W 78–76	Cuneta Astrodome	23–5	
29	February 3	Manila	L 74–78	Strike Gymnasium	23–6	
30	February 6	Iloilo	W 79–68	Alonte Sports Arnea	24–6	
Source: Schedule

== Playoffs ==
=== Schedule ===
2020 Bacoor City Strikers playoffs schedule
Round	Game	Date	Opponent	Score	Location	Series	Recap
Division Quarterfinals	1	February 19	General Santos	W 95–72	Strike Gymnasium	1–0	Recap
Division Quarterfinals	2	February 24	General Santos	W 69–60	Lamitan Capitol Gymnasium	2–0	Recap
Division Semifinals	1	March 2	Basilan	L 63–77	Davao City Recreation Center	0–1	Recap
Division Semifinals	2	March 5	Basilan	W 80–69	Strike Gymnasium	1–1	Recap
Division Semifinals	3	March 7	Basilan	L 76–84	Strike Gymnasium	1–2	Recap
Source: Schedule
