= 2019–20 Pampanga Giant Lanterns season =

Philippine basketball team season

- Head coach: Bong Ramos

Results
- Record: 21–9 (.700)
- Place: Division: 4th (North)
- Playoff finish: Division Semifinals (lost vs. San Juan, 0–2)

Pampanga Giant Lanterns seasons

The 2019–20 Pampanga Giant Lanterns season was the second season of the franchise in the Maharlika Pilipinas Basketball League (MPBL).

Pampanga looked to improve from their 11–14 record in the previous season after missing the playoffs by tiebreaker. On November 27, they would do so by clinching their 14th win, surpassing their previous campaign by winning percentage. That would also be the start of an eight-game winning streak to close the season with a record of 21–9, as they would claim fourth place in the North Division. The team first faced against the Bataan Risers, which they would beat in a sweep. They then took on the defending champion San Juan Knights, who they would fall to in a sweep of their own.

The team played all of their home games at Angeles University Foundation in Angeles City. As of 2023, this would be their last season in Angeles before moving to San Fernando to play at the Bren Z. Guiao Convention Center in future seasons.

== Regular season ==
=== Standings ===
Pos	Team	Pld	W	L	PCT	GB	Qualification
2	Manila Stars	30	25	5	.833	1	Playoffs
3	Makati Super Crunch	30	22	8	.733	4	Playoffs
4	Pampanga Giant Lanterns	30	21	9	.700	5	Playoffs
5	Bataan Risers	30	20	10	.667	6	Playoffs
6	Bulacan Kuyas	30	19	11	.633	7	Playoffs

Source: Standings
Rules for classification: 1) Wins; 2a) If two teams are tied, head-to-head match-up; 2b) If three or more teams are tied, head-to-head point quotient; 3) overall point quotient; 4) coin toss.

=== Schedule ===
2019–20 Pampanga Giant Lanterns season schedule
Game	Date	Opponent	Score	Location	Record	Recap
1	June 13	General Santos	W 94–85	Caloocan Sports Complex	1–0	
2	June 19	Bicol	L 70–82	Valenzuela Astrodome	1–1	
3	June 26	Basilan	L 74–83	Valenzuela Astrodome	1–2	
4	July 6	Bulacan	W 69–63	Angeles University Foundation	2–2	
5	July 13	Marikina	W 95–69	Pasig Sports Center	3–2	
6	July 19	Manila	L 76–92	Alonte Sports Arena	3–3	
7	July 25	Biñan City	W 96–86	Pasig Sports Center	4–3	
8	July 31	Valenzuela	W 77–74	Angeles University Foundation	5–3	
9	August 14	Mindoro	W 85–78	Angeles University Foundation	6–3	
10	August 21	Makati	L 94–96	JCSGO Christian Academy	6–4	
11	August 28	Navotas	W 83–74	Pasig Sports Center	7–4	
12	September 5	Davao Occidental	W 65–62	Angeles University Foundation	8–4	
13	September 9	Muntinlupa	W 77–66	Muntinlupa Sports Complex	9–4	
14	September 17	San Juan	L 97–102	Angeles University Foundation	9–5	
15	September 24	Imus	W 99–82	Marist School	10–5	
16	October 3	Iloilo	L 70–76	Cuneta Astrodome	10–6	
17	October 10	Zamboanga	L 59–73	Strike Gymnasium	10–7	
18	October 17	Bacoor City	W 76–69	La Salle Coliseum	11–7	
19	October 24	Caloocan	W 76–70	Marist School	12–7	
20	November 5	Sarangani	W 115–71	Alonte Sports Arena	13–7	
21	November 12	Bataan	L 76–77	Marikina Sports Center	13–8	
22	November 22	Quezon City	L 75–81	Pasig Sports Center	13–9	
23	November 27	Parañaque	W 82–63	Sarangani Capitol Gymnasium	14–9	
24	December 17	Pasay	W 75–65	Valenzuela Astrodome	15–9	
25	January 9	Nueva Ecija	W 81–75	Angeles University Foundation	16–9	
26	January 16	Batangas City	W 82–79	Angeles University Foundation	17–9	
27	January 23	Rizal	W 90–70	Ynares Sports Arena	18–9	
28	January 28	Cebu	W 88–77	Cuneta Astrodome	19–9	
29	February 1	Bacolod	W 82–65	Angeles University Foundation	20–9	
30	February 5	Pasig	W 71–62	Bataan People's Center	21–9	
Source: Schedule

== Playoffs ==
=== Schedule ===
2020 Pampanga Giant Lanterns playoffs schedule
Round	Game	Date	Opponent	Score	Location	Series	Recap
Division Quarterfinals	1	February 15	Bataan	W 71–64	Filoil Flying V Centre	1–0	Recap
Division Quarterfinals	2	February 20	Bataan	W 83–80	Angeles University Foundation	2–0	Recap
Division Semifinals	1	February 28	San Juan	L 84–86	Filoil Flying V Centre	0–1	Recap
Division Semifinals	2	March 4	San Juan	L 83–91	San Andres Sports Complex	0–2	Recap
Source: Schedule
