= 2019–20 Pasig Sta. Lucia Realtors season =

Results
- Record: 18–12 (.600)
- Place: Division: 7th (North)
- Playoff finish: Division Quarterfinals (lost vs. Manila, 0–2)

Pasig Sta. Lucia Realtors seasons

The 2019–20 Pasig Sta. Lucia Realtors season was the second season of the franchise in the Maharlika Pilipinas Basketball League (MPBL).

The team, now backed by Sta. Lucia Land, looked to improve from a dismal 4–21 campaign, which saw Pasig claim the worst record of the season. They would surpass that in win percentage with their fifth victory on August 2. The Realtors got off to a 9–3 start before finishing the season 18–12, ranked seventh in the North Division. They would be swept by the Manila Stars in the Division Quarterfinals.

The team played all of their home games this season at Pasig Sports Center. The Pasig-based team would move to Ynares Sports Arena in future seasons.

== Regular season ==
=== Standings ===
Pos	Team	Pld	W	L	PCT	GB	Qualification
5	Bataan Risers	30	20	10	.667	6	Playoffs
6	Bulacan Kuyas	30	19	11	.633	7	Playoffs
7	Pasig Sta. Lucia Realtors	30	18	12	.600	8	Playoffs
8	Pasay Voyagers	30	17	13	.567	9	Playoffs
9	Caloocan Supremos	30	16	14	.533	10	

Source: Standings
Rules for classification: 1) Wins; 2a) If two teams are tied, head-to-head match-up; 2b) If three or more teams are tied, head-to-head point quotient; 3) overall point quotient; 4) coin toss.

=== Schedule ===
2019–20 Pasig Sta. Lucia Realtors season schedule
Game	Date	Opponent	Score	Location	Record	Recap
1	June 22	Zamboanga	L 69–82	Muntinlupa Sports Complex	0–1	
2	June 26	Caloocan	W 89–87	Valenzuela Astrodome	1–1	
3	July 3	Bacoor City	L 64–73	Pasig Sports Center	1–2	
4	July 13	Pasay	W 71–68	Pasig Sports Center	2–2	
5	July 22	Rizal	W 78–72	Pasig Sports Center	3–2	
6	July 25	Bacolod	W 87–68	Pasig Sports Center	4–2	
7	August 2	Sarangani	W 89–77	Pasig Sports Center	5–2	
8	August 10	Parañaque	W 100–87	Hoops Dome	6–2	
9	August 16	Batangas City	L 62–67	Pasig Sports Center	6–3	
10	August 21	Quezon City	W 91–82	JCSGO Christian Academy	7–3	
11	August 28	Nueva Ecija	W 85–72	Pasig Sports Center	8–3	
12	September 11	Cebu	W 78–68	Strike Gymnasium	9–3	
13	September 18	General Santos	L 82–91	San Andres Sports Complex	9–4	
14	October 2	Bataan	W 64–63	Valenzuela Astrodome	10–4	
15	October 8	Makati	L 87–101	Valenzuela Astrodome	10–5	
16	October 12	Bicol	W 75–73	Bataan People's Center	11–5	
17	October 29	Mindoro	L 75–76	Pasig Sports Center	11–6	
18	November 4	Manila	L 56–69	Ynares Center	11–7	
19	November 8	Bulacan	W 77–72	Olivarez College	12–7	
20	November 12	Marikina	W 69–63	Marikina Sports Center	13–7	
21	November 18	Iloilo	L 65–79	Makati Coliseum	13–8	
22	November 22	Muntinlupa	W 98–76	Pasig Sports Center	14–8	
23	December 17	Davao Occidental	L 71–75	Valenzuela Astrodome	14–9	
24	January 7	Basilan	L 83–89	Bulacan Capitol Gymnasium	14–10	
25	January 11	San Juan	L 99–109	Filoil Flying V Centre	14–11	
26	January 16	Imus	W 93–88	Angeles University Foundation	15–11	
27	January 21	Biñan City	W 82–75	Alonte Sports Arena	16–11	
28	January 25	Navotas	W 107–100	Alonte Sports Arena	17–11	
29	January 31	Valenzuela	W 90–72	Cuneta Astrodome	18–11	
30	February 5	Pampanga	L 62–71	Bataan People's Center	18–12	
Source: Schedule

== Playoffs ==
=== Schedule ===
2020 Pasig Sta. Lucia Realtors playoffs schedule
Round	Game	Date	Opponent	Score	Location	Series	Recap
Division Quarterfinals	1	February 18	Manila	L 88–91	San Andres Sports Complex	0–1	Recap
Division Quarterfinals	2	February 22	Manila	L 80–82	Malolos Sports and Convention Center	0–2	Recap
Source: Schedule
