= 2019–20 Bicol Volcanoes season =

Results
- Record: 16–14 (.533)
- Place: Division: 8th (South)
- Playoff finish: Division Quarterfinals (lost vs. Davao Occidental, 1–2)

Bicol Volcanoes seasons

The 2019–20 Bicol Volcanoes season was the inaugural season of the franchise in the Maharlika Pilipinas Basketball League (MPBL).

On June 19, the Volcanoes would claim thri first franchise victory against the Pampanga Giant Lanterns. After starting the season 8–5, the team went on a six-game losing streak, falling down to 8–11. Bicol then came back and won eight of the eleven remaining games to finish the regular season 16–14 and clinch the playoffs. They would eventually be ranked eighth in the South Division. In game 2 of the Division Quarterfinals, the Volcanoes would win a game against the Davao Occidental Tigers to tie the series, marking the first time in league history that an 8-seed won a playoff game against a 1-seed. Bicol, however, would then lose the deciding game 3.

The team played two home games this season, one at Ibalong Centrum for Recreation and the other at Albay Astrodome, both located in Legazpi, Albay.

== Regular season ==
=== Standings ===
| Pos | Team | Pld | W | L | PCT | GB | Qualification |
|---|---|---|---|---|---|---|---|
| 6 | Iloilo United Royals | 30 | 18 | 12 | .600 (Note: Zamboanga (1.071), Iloilo (0.976), and General Santos (0.960) are ranked based on head-to-head point quotient.) | 8 | Playoffs |
| 7 | GenSan Warriors | 30 | 18 | 12 | .600 | 8 | Playoffs |
| 8 | Bicol Volcanoes | 30 | 16 | 14 | .533 | 10 | Playoffs |
| 9 | Cebu Casino Ethyl Alcohol | 30 | 15 | 15 | .500 | 11 | |
| 10 | Biñan City Luxxe White | 30 | 12 | 18 | .400 | 14 | |

Source: Standings
Rules for classification: 1) Wins; 2a) If two teams are tied, head-to-head match-up; 2b) If three or more teams are tied, head-to-head point quotient; 3) overall point quotient; 4) coin toss.

=== Schedule ===
2019–20 Bicol Volcanoes season schedule
| Game | Date | Opponent | Score | Location | Record | Recap |
|---|---|---|---|---|---|---|
| 1 | June 12 | Basilan | | SM Mall of Asia | 0–1 | |
| 2 | June 19 | Pampanga | | Valenzuela Astrodome | 1–1 | |
| 3 | June 27 | Bulacan | | Strike Gymnasium | 1–2 | |
| 4 | July 3 | Marikina | | Pasig Sports Center | 2–2 | |
| 5 | July 8 | Imus | | Cuneta Astrodome | 3–2 | |
| 6 | July 13 | Biñan City | | Pasig Sports Center | 4–2 | |
| 7 | July 18 | Valenzuela | | Batangas City Coliseum | 5–2 | |
| 8 | July 27 | Iloilo | | Ibalong Centrum for Recreation | 5–3 | |
| 9 | August 2 | Mindoro | | Pasig Sports Center | 5–4 | |
| 10 | August 8 | Makati | | Caloocan Sports Complex | 5–5 | |
| 11 | August 17 | Navotas | | Baliwag Star Arena | 6–5 | |
| 12 | August 23 | Muntinlupa | | Muntinlupa Sports Complex | 7–5 | |
| 13 | August 31 | Zamboanga | | Mayor Vitaliano D. Agan Coliseum | 8–5 | |
| 14 | September 7 | Manila | | Albay Astrodome | 8–6 | |
| 15 | September 11 | Bacoor City | | Strike Gymnasium | 8–7 | |
| 16 | September 17 | Davao Occidental | | Angeles University Foundation | 8–8 | |
| 17 | October 1 | San Juan | | Muntinlupa Sports Complex | 8–9 | |
| 18 | October 4 | Caloocan | | Strike Gymnasium | 8–10 | |
| 19 | October 12 | Pasig | | Bataan People's Center | 8–11 | |
| 20 | October 22 | Batangas City | | Batangas City Coliseum | 9–11 | |
| 21 | October 29 | Pasay | | Pasig Sports Center | 10–11 | |
| 22 | November 7 | Nueva Ecija | | Valenzuela Astrodome | 11–11 | |
| 23 | November 20 | Parañaque | | Bataan People's Center | 12–11 | |
| 24 | November 25 | Cebu | | Makati Coliseum | 13–11 | |
| 25 | December 16 | Bacolod | | Imus City Sports Complex | 13–12 | |
| 26 | January 15 | Bataan | | Bataan People's Center | 13–13 | |
| 27 | January 21 | Sarangani | | Alonte Sports Arena | 14–13 | |
| 28 | January 25 | Quezon City | | Alonte Sports Arena | 15–13 | |
| 29 | January 30 | Rizal | | Bulacan Capitol Gymnasium | 15–14 | |
| 30 | February 1 | General Santos | | Angeles University Foundation | 16–14 | |
Source: Schedule

== Playoffs ==
=== Schedule ===
2020 Bicol Volcanoes playoffs schedule
| Round | Game | Date | Opponent | Score | Location | Series | Recap |
|---|---|---|---|---|---|---|---|
| Division Quarterfinals | 1 | February 17 | Davao Occidental | | Davao City Recreation Center | 0–1 | Recap |
| Division Quarterfinals | 2 | February 21 | Davao Occidental | | Batangas City Coliseum | 1–1 | Recap |
| Division Quarterfinals | 3 | February 26 | Davao Occidental | | Davao City Recreation Center | 1–2 | Recap |
Source: Schedule
