= 2019–20 Pasay Voyagers season =

- Head coach: Marlon Martin

Results
- Record: 17–13 (.567)
- Place: Division: 8th (North)
- Playoff finish: Division Quarterfinals (lost vs. San Juan, 0–2)

Pasay Voyagers seasons

The 2019–20 Pasay Voyagers season was the second season of the franchise in the Maharlika Pilipinas Basketball League (MPBL).

The team entered this season after finishing 8–17 in the previous season. After starting 3–5, the Voyagers would win nine of their next ten games, including a seven-game winning streak that capped off with their 10th win on September 19, which surpassed their previous campaign in win percentage. Despite going 1–6 in the seven games after that, they would finish the season going 4–1 in their last five games, culminating with their 17th victory to clinch the eighth seed in the North Division. They would then be swept by the San Juan Knights in the Division Quarterfinals.

The team played all of their home games this season at Cuneta Astrodome.

== Regular season ==
=== Standings ===
Pos	Team	Pld	W	L	PCT	GB	Qualification
6	Bulacan Kuyas	30	19	11	.633	7	Playoffs
7	Pasig Sta. Lucia Realtors	30	18	12	.600	8	Playoffs
8	Pasay Voyagers	30	17	13	.567	9	Playoffs
9	Caloocan Supremos	30	16	14	.533	10	
10	Valenzuela Classic	30	11	19	.367	15	

Source: Standings
Rules for classification: 1) Wins; 2a) If two teams are tied, head-to-head match-up; 2b) If three or more teams are tied, head-to-head point quotient; 3) overall point quotient; 4) coin toss.

=== Schedule ===
2019–20 Pasay Voyagers season schedule
Game	Date	Opponent	Score	Location	Record	Recap
1	June 17	Navotas	W 70–68	Alonte Sports Arena	1–0	
2	June 22	Muntinlupa	W 76–75	Muntinlupa Sports Complex	2–0	
3	June 28	San Juan	L 72–74	Filoil Flying V Centre	2–1	
4	July 4	Imus	W 82–65	San Andres Sports Complex	3–1	
5	July 8	Davao Occidental	L 67–69	Cuneta Astrodome	3–2	
6	July 13	Pasig	L 68–71	Pasig Sports Center	3–3	
7	July 19	Zamboanga	L 82–83	Alonte Sports Arena	3–4	
8	July 23	Caloocan	L 72–78	Caloocan Sports Complex	3–5	
9	August 1	Bacoor City	W 83–78	Cuneta Astrodome	4–5	
10	August 5	Batangas City	W 72–61	Filoil Flying V Centre	5–5	
11	August 19	Rizal	W 74–69	Cuneta Astrodome	6–5	
12	August 29	Sarangani	W 70–54	Cuneta Astrodome	7–5	
13	September 3	Nueva Ecija	W 75–69	Bataan People's Center	8–5	
14	September 10	Parañaque	W 79–60	Cuneta Astrodome	9–5	
15	September 19	Iloilo	W 56–52	University of San Agustin	10–5	
16	September 25	Bataan	L 71–72	Caloocan Sports Complex	10–6	
17	October 3	Quezon City	W 92–89	Cuneta Astrodome	11–6	
18	October 14	Marikina	W 70–66	Imus City Sports Complex	12–6	
19	October 19	Manila	L 72–73	Ibalong Centrum for Recreation	12–7	
20	October 29	Bicol	L 68–72	Pasig Sports Center	12–8	
21	November 7	Valenzuela	L 61–77	Valenzuela Astrodome	12–9	
22	November 14	Bulacan	L 98–100	Bulacan Capitol Gymnasium	12–10	
23	November 18	Cebu	W 82–74	Makati Coliseum	13–10	
24	December 17	Pampanga	L 65–75	Valenzuela Astrodome	13–11	
25	January 8	General Santos	L 69–76	Cuneta Astrodome	13–12	
26	January 15	Bacolod	W 61–50	Bataan People's Center	14–12	
27	January 24	Biñan City	W 68–57	Bataan People's Center	15–12	
28	January 28	Makati	W 79–61	Cuneta Astrodome	16–12	
29	January 31	Basilan	L 59–74	Cuneta Astrodome	16–13	
30	February 4	Mindoro	W 84–72	Cuneta Astrodome	17–13	
Source: Schedule

== Playoffs ==
=== Schedule ===
2020 Pasay Voyagers playoffs schedule
Round	Game	Date	Opponent	Score	Location	Series	Recap
Division Quarterfinals	1	February 15	San Juan	L 74–75	Filoil Flying V Centre	0–1	Recap
Division Quarterfinals	2	February 20	San Juan	L 67–74	Angeles University Foundation	0–2	Recap
Source: Schedule
