= 2019–20 Bataan Risers season =

Results
- Record: 20–10 (.667)
- Place: Division: 5th (North)
- Playoff finish: Division Quarterfinals (lost vs. Pampanga, 0–2)

Bataan Risers seasons

The 2019–20 Bataan Risers season was the third season of the franchise in the Maharlika Pilipinas Basketball League (MPBL).

Bataan came off to a slow start following a first-seed finish and a Division Semifinals run in the previous season, going 7–8 through the first half of the season. In the second half, the team would turn things around as they would win thirteen games during that span, including a seven-game winning streak from October 8 to November 20. The Risers finished in fifth place with a 20–10 record. In the Division Quarterfinals, they would be swept by their regional rival in the Pampanga Giant Lanterns.

All of their home games this season took place at the Bataan People's Center in Balanga.

== Regular season ==
=== Standings ===
Pos	Team	Pld	W	L	PCT	GB	Qualification
3	Makati Super Crunch	30	22	8	.733	4	Playoffs
4	Pampanga Giant Lanterns	30	21	9	.700	5	Playoffs
5	Bataan Risers	30	20	10	.667	6	Playoffs
6	Bulacan Kuyas	30	19	11	.633	7	Playoffs
7	Pasig Sta. Lucia Realtors	30	18	12	.600	8	Playoffs

Source: Standings
Rules for classification: 1) Wins; 2a) If two teams are tied, head-to-head match-up; 2b) If three or more teams are tied, head-to-head point quotient; 3) overall point quotient; 4) coin toss.

=== Schedule ===
2019–20 Bataan Risers season schedule
Game	Date	Opponent	Score	Location	Record	Recap
1	June 17	Biñan City	W 75–62	Alonte Sports Arena	1–0	
2	June 26	Valenzuela	L 86–92	Valenzuela Astrodome	1–1	
3	July 1	Iloilo	L 78–84	Blue Eagle Gym	1–2	
4	July 6	Mindoro	W 97–87	Angeles University Foundation	2–2	
5	July 12	Makati	L 69–76	Caloocan Sports Complex	2–3	
6	July 23	Muntinlupa	W 83–56	Caloocan Sports Complex	3–3	
7	July 27	San Juan	L 79–87	Ibalong Centrum for Recreation	3–4	
8	August 6	Imus	W 65–61	Ynares Sports Arena	4–4	
9	August 12	Davao Occidental	L 75–83	Filoil Flying V Centre	4–5	
10	August 22	Zamboanga	W 92–79	Bataan People's Center	5–5	
11	August 28	Caloocan	W 90–77	Pasig Sports Center	6–5	
12	September 4	Bacoor City	L 66–93	Bataan People's Center	6–6	
13	September 14	Batangas City	L 69–73	Bataan People's Center	6–7	
14	September 25	Pasay	W 72–71	Caloocan Sports Complex	7–7	
15	October 2	Pasig	L 63–64	Valenzuela Astrodome	7–8	
16	October 8	Bacolod	W 84–65	Valenzuela Astrodome	8–8	
17	October 12	Rizal	W 78–57	Bataan People's Center	9–8	
18	October 16	Sarangani	W 102–71	Batangas City Coliseum	10–8	
19	October 21	Parañaque	W 75–56	Filoil Flying V Centre	11–8	
20	November 6	Quezon City	W 79–73	Alonte Sports Arena	12–8	
21	November 12	Pampanga	W 77–76	Marikina Sports Center	13–8	
22	November 20	Nueva Ecija	W 71–60	Bataan People's Center	14–8	
23	November 25	Bulacan	L 79–81	Makati Coliseum	14–9	
24	December 19	Basilan	W 91–83	Bataan People's Center	15–9	
25	January 9	Manila	W 77–76	Angeles University Foundation	16–9	
26	January 15	Bicol	W 76–72	Bataan People's Center	17–9	
27	January 17	Navotas	W 81–78	Valenzuela Astrodome	18–9	
28	January 24	General Santos	W 74–66	Bataan People's Center	19–9	
29	February 3	Cebu	L 65–75	Strike Gymnasium	19–10	
30	February 5	Marikina	W 82–76	Bataan People's Center	20–10	
Source: Schedule

== Playoffs ==
=== Schedule ===
2020 Bataan Risers playoffs schedule
Round	Game	Date	Opponent	Score	Location	Series	Recap
Division Quarterfinals	1	February 15	Pampanga	L 64–71	Filoil Flying V Centre	0–1	Recap
Division Quarterfinals	2	February 20	Pampanga	L 80–83	Angeles University Foundation	0–2	Recap
Source: Schedule
