= University of Southeastern Philippines =

Public university in Davao City, Philippines

- Kinatumhaan sa Habagatan Sidlakang Pilipinas (Cebuano); Pamantasan ng Timog-Silangang Pilipinas (Filipino)
- Former name: University of Southern Philippines
- Motto: Collaboration, Accountability, Resilience, Excellence, Service-Oriented (CARES)
- Type: Public Regional State Research coeducational higher education institution
- Established: December 15, 1978; 47 years ago
- Academic affiliations: AACCUP, ACSCU-AAI, MASCUF
- President: Dr. Bonifacio G. Gabales, Jr.
- Faculty: 1152
- Students: 55,450
- Location: Iñigo St., Obrero, Davao City, Philippines; 7°05′10″N 125°37′01″E
- Campus: Urban Main Obrero, Davao City 6.5 hectares (65,000 m^{2}) Satellite; Mintal, Davao City 2.8 hectares (28,000 m^{2}); Tagum City, Davao del Norte 77 hectares (770,000 m^{2}); Mabini, Davao de Oro 109 hectares (1,090,000 m^{2}); Santo Tomas External Studies Program Center
- Alma Mater song: USeP Naming Liyag
- Newspaper: The Collegiate Headlight
- Colors: Red Yellow Green White
- Nicknames: USePian, YANO
- Sporting affiliations: SCUAA
- Website: www.usep.edu.ph
- Location in Mindanao Location in the Philippines

The University of Southeastern Philippines (USeP; Cebuano: Kinatumhaan sa Habagatan Sidlakang Pilipinas; Filipino: Pamantasan ng Timog-Silangang Pilipinas) is a public, research, coeducational, regional state university based in Davao City, Philippines. Founded on December 15, 1978, the university is an integration of four state educational institutions: Mindanao State University-Davao, the University of the Philippines-Master of Management Program in Davao, the Davao School of Arts and Trades, and the Davao National Regional Agricultural School. It was the first state university in Davao Region.

The university has four campuses: Obrero (main) and Mintal campuses in Davao City, Tagum-Mabini Campus which has two units—one in Tagum City in Davao del Norte and one in Mabini in Davao de Oro, and Santo Tomas External Studies Program Center in Santo Tomas, Davao del Norte.

== History ==
December 15, 1978, marked the birth of the first ever state university in Region XI. On this date, Batas Pambansa Blg. 12 was passed, thereby creating the University of Southern Philippines, the givers of the university's initial name not knowing that there was already a university of the same name, the University of Southern Philippines in Cebu, to be later renamed as the University of Southeastern Philippines.

The integration of the School of Arts and Trades (DSAT) and the Davao National Regional Agricultural School (DNRAS) paved the way for the birth of the five USeP campuses: the Davao City main campus in Obrero with an area of 6.5 hectares; the Mintal campus, Davao City that has an area of 2.8 hectares; the Tagum campus, Tagum City with a 77-hectare land area; the Mabini campus which lies in a 109-hectare land area in Mampising, Mabini, Davao de Oro Province; and the latest addition, Bislig campus in Bislig, Surigao del Sur with an area of 9.7 hectares.

The early years saw birth of the College of Engineering and Technology in Obrero campus, the College of Forestry and Agriculture at Tagum and Mabini campuses and College of Arts and Sciences in Mintal campus. The succeeding years witnessed developments in the academic and administrative realms of USeP.

In 1993, through a Board of Regents (BOR) resolution, External Studies Programs were established. These were USeP-Hinatuan Ext. Program in Surigao del Sur; USeP-Baganga External Studies Program in Davao Oriental; USeP-Kapalong College of Agricultural Technology and Entrepreneurship and USeP-Pantukan External Studies Program.

In 1996, USeP-Bislig campus in Surigao del Sur was established. PICOP waived nine hectares of Barangay Maharlika, Bislig for the initial campus.

From 1993 to 1997, new units were created. Among them were Mindanao Center for Policy Studies (MCPS); Affiliated Non-Conventional Energy Center (ANEC) for Region XI; Office of Admission and Student Records (OASR); Medical Division; Institute of Urban Finance and Management; University Testing and Guidance Office (UGTO); Project Implementation Unit (PIU); Institute of Computing (IC) and Center for Professministrative and organizational structure of the university to make it more responsive to changing needs and to enable the university to engage more in research and extension. Today, it has a modified organizational structure of the university, which sees the continued implementation of the university's decentralization policies under established policy guidelines, which has resulted to more effective and efficient units. The Evening Program implemented through BOR resolution No. 2732 accommodates students who could not make it in the regular day program with some variation in fees. Also, Summer Program has been approved. By the year 2001, the total number of curriculum offerings was 31 for the Graduate School and 28 for the Undergraduate Program.

Beginning 2002, the Office of the President under the administration of Dr. Julieta I. Ortiz identified and pursued Program Accreditation as one of the major thrusts of the university. The same year, three programs were awarded Level I status by AACCUP. These were BSED of USeP Tagum and Obrero, BEED of Obrero and Forestry and Agricultural Engineering of Tagum. Today, 16 of its undergraduate programs are accredited academic units.

== Supreme Court Decision (Fire Incident) ==
The Supreme Court of the Philippines has ordered the University of Southeastern Philippines and several school officials to pay P6.45 million in damages to the parents of Cheryl Sarate, who died from severe burn injuries after her costume caught fire during a university beauty pageant in 2006.

In a decision penned by SAS Marvic M.V.F. Leonen, promulgated on November 25, 2026 (G.R. 247617), the SC found the university negligent for failing to enforce proper safety measures, provide trained emergency responders, and adequately supervise the event organized by the Guild of English Students.

== Campuses ==
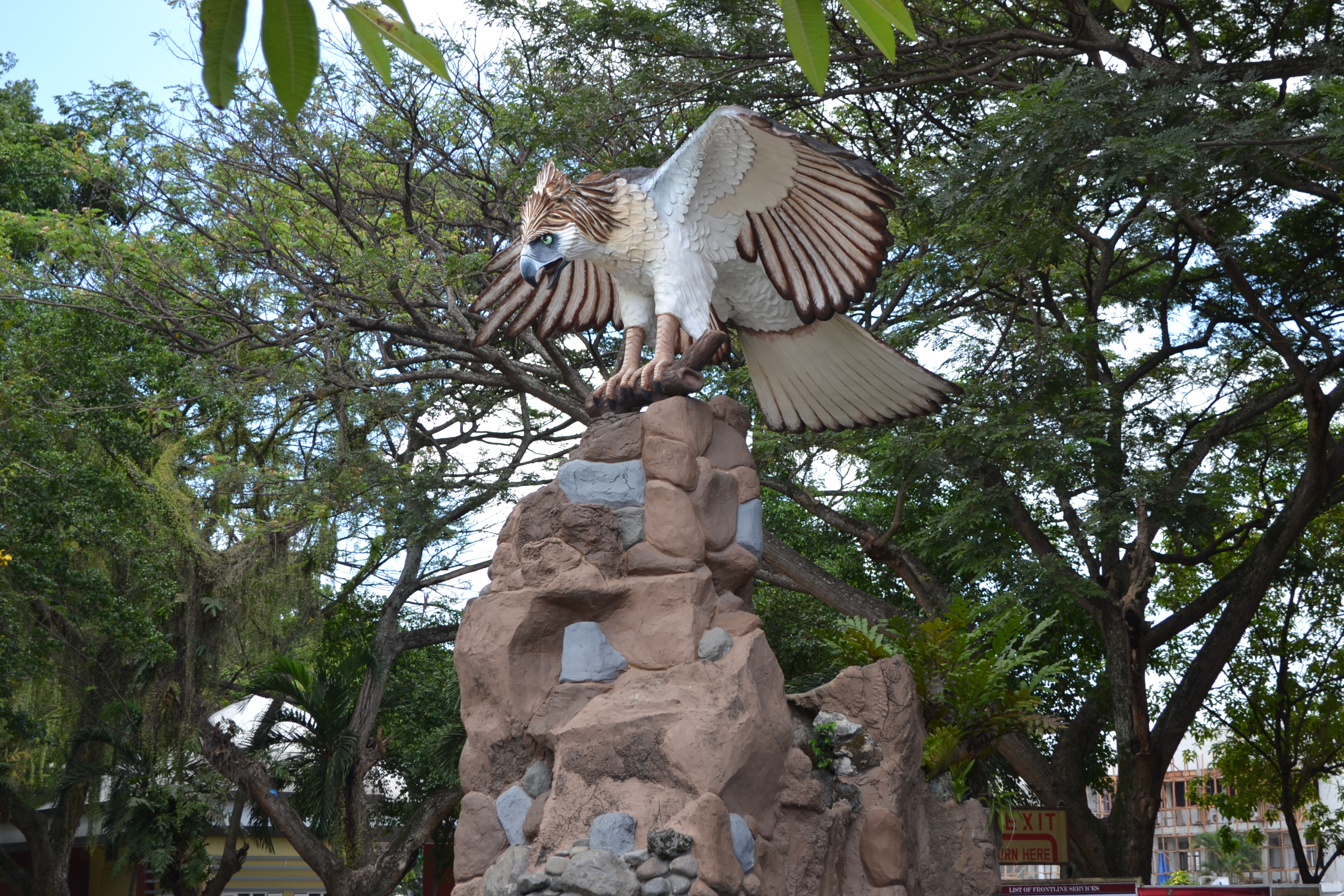
The University Eagle at the USeP Obrero Main Campus

USeP's main campus is located at Bo. Obrero, Poblacion District, Davao City. Formerly called the Davao School of Arts and Trades, it offers the highest number and widest array of degrees amongst USeP campuses. It offers degrees in liberal arts, science, engineering, business, economics, computer science and teacher education, among others.

The second campus of the university is the Tagum-Mabini campus and has two units: one in Apokon, Tagum City and another in Pindasan, Mabini, Davao de Oro.

The Tagum Unit houses the College of Teacher Education and Technology (CTET), College of Engineering (CoE) - Department of Agriculture and Biosystems Engineering (DABE), and the USeP School of Medicine (SoM) which is the only state-run medical school in the Davao Region.

Meanwhile, the Mabini Unit houses the College of Agriculture and Related Sciences. It was formerly called Mampising National Agricultural School, which was integrated in the university in 1978. Today it offers degrees in agriculture, forestry and additional graduate degrees in natural resource management and agricultural extension.

Finally, the Mintal campus is the former Mindanao State University Davao branch. Today it offers degrees in agribusiness, social sciences, communication, public administration and economics. The unit also manages the Malabog extension, serving indigenous people of upland Davao City.

Formerly USeP managed a campus in Bislig campus but it was later turned over to the North Eastern Mindanao State University.

== Rankings ==
University rankings

Regional – Overall
- QS Asia: 901+ (2025)

The University of Southeastern Philippines (USeP), a state university in Davao City, was one of the 15 Philippine universities that made it to the 2011 list of top Asian universities done by Quacquarelli Symonds (QS) with a rank of 201+.

In 2012, USeP Davao made it for the first time to the 251-300 bracket in the Top 300 Asian Universities list of education and career network Quacquarelli Symonds (QS).

In the 2013 QS rankings released on its official website, USeP is one of the Asian universities that occupied the 251st - 300th ranking. The university ranks top five (5) among other Philippine universities that made it to the list. The Philippine schools that occupied the top four (4) slots are the University of the Philippines at 67th; Ateneo de Manila University at 109th; University of Santo Tomas at 150th; and De La Salle University at 151st- 160th.

In the recent UniRank’s Top Philippine Universities 2024 assessment, USeP has climbed to the 22nd place out of 234 higher education institutions in the Philippines, while maintaining the 3rd spot in the Davao Region.

In 2025, USeP ranked #169 in the QS World University Rankings for South-Eastern Asia in 2025. Additionally, it is placed in the 901+ band in the overall Asia rankings. USeP is also 1 of the 2 universities in Davao City, the other being Ateneo de Davao University to rank in QS 2025
