= Blue Eagle Gym =

University gymnasium in Quezon City, Philippines

- BEG
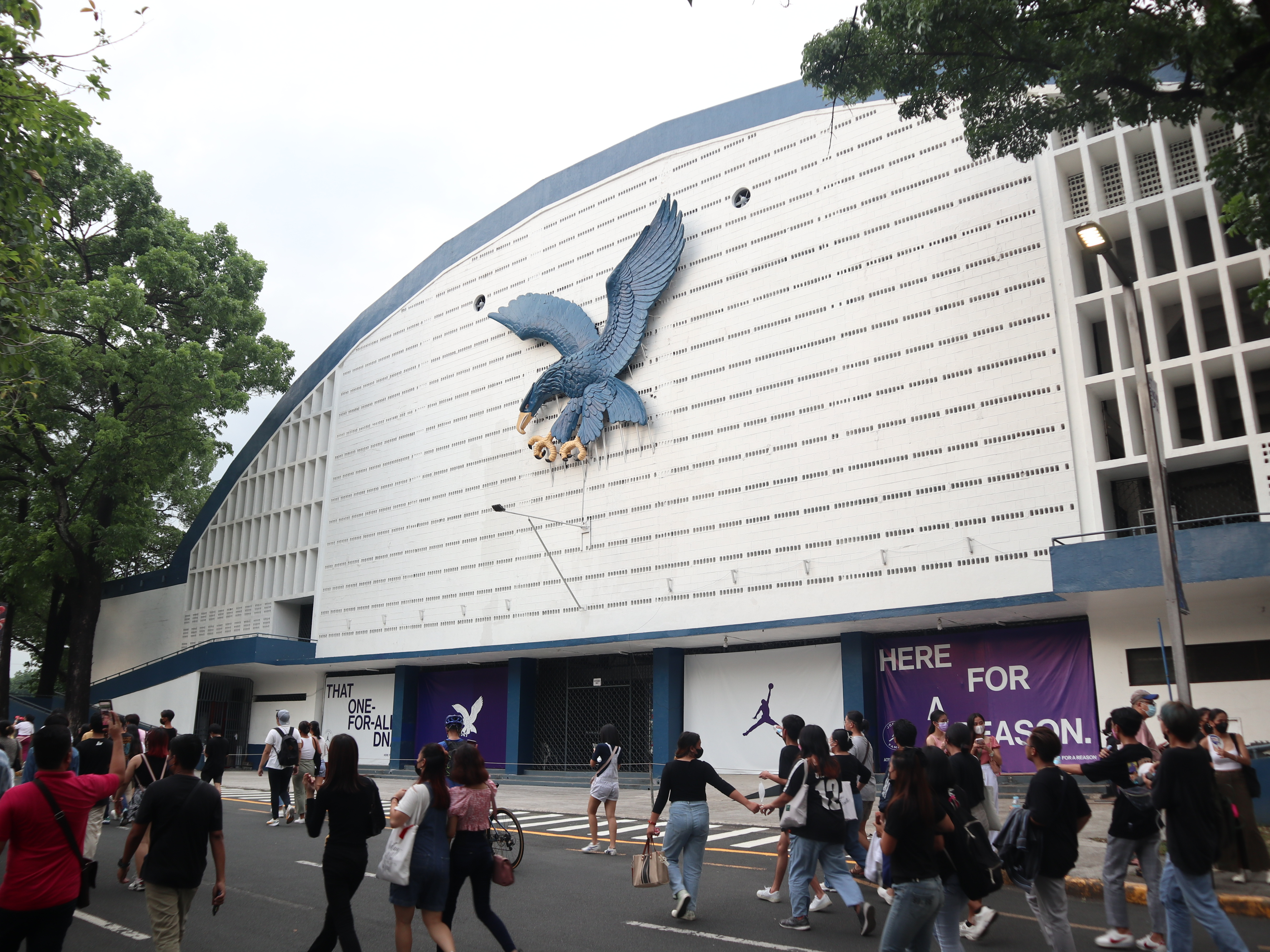
- The gymnasium in 2022.
- Interactive map of Blue Eagle Gym
- Former names: Loyola Center (Note: There are conflicting information about the timeline of the name of the Blue Eagle Gym.: A The Guidon report for the gym's 65th anniversary claims that the venue was named Loyola Center due to a sponsorship deal from the 1960s to the 1970s. It writes that it reverted back to its "original name" after the lease expired.; Another The Guidon report for the venue's anniversary claimed that the venue was known as the Loyola Center from its inception in 1949 until 2000, when the name Blue Eagle Gym was adopted.; The Manila Times report that the name was known as the Ateneo de Manila Gymnasium when it was inaugurated in 1949.); Ateneo de Manila Gymnasium
- Location: Katipunan Ave., Loyola Heights, Quezon City, Philippines
- Coordinates: 14°38′07″N 121°04′32″E
- Owner: Ateneo de Manila University
- Operator: Ateneo de Manila University
- Capacity: 4,850–7,000
- Public transit: Katipunan

Construction
- Opened: December 3, 1949
- Renovated: late 1990s, 2023–2025

Tenants
- Philippines men's national basketball team Ateneo Blue Eagles; National Collegiate Athletic Association (Philippines) (1949–1978); University Athletic Association of the Philippines (1979–2005, 2025–present); Manila Metrostars (1998–2000); Spikers' Turf (2018–present); Quezon City Capitals (2018–2020)

The Blue Eagle Gym (BEG) is a gymnasium located in the main campus of the Ateneo de Manila University in Quezon City, Philippines.

The indoor venue hosts major sporting events of the Ateneo, as well as commencement exercises for the university.

== History ==
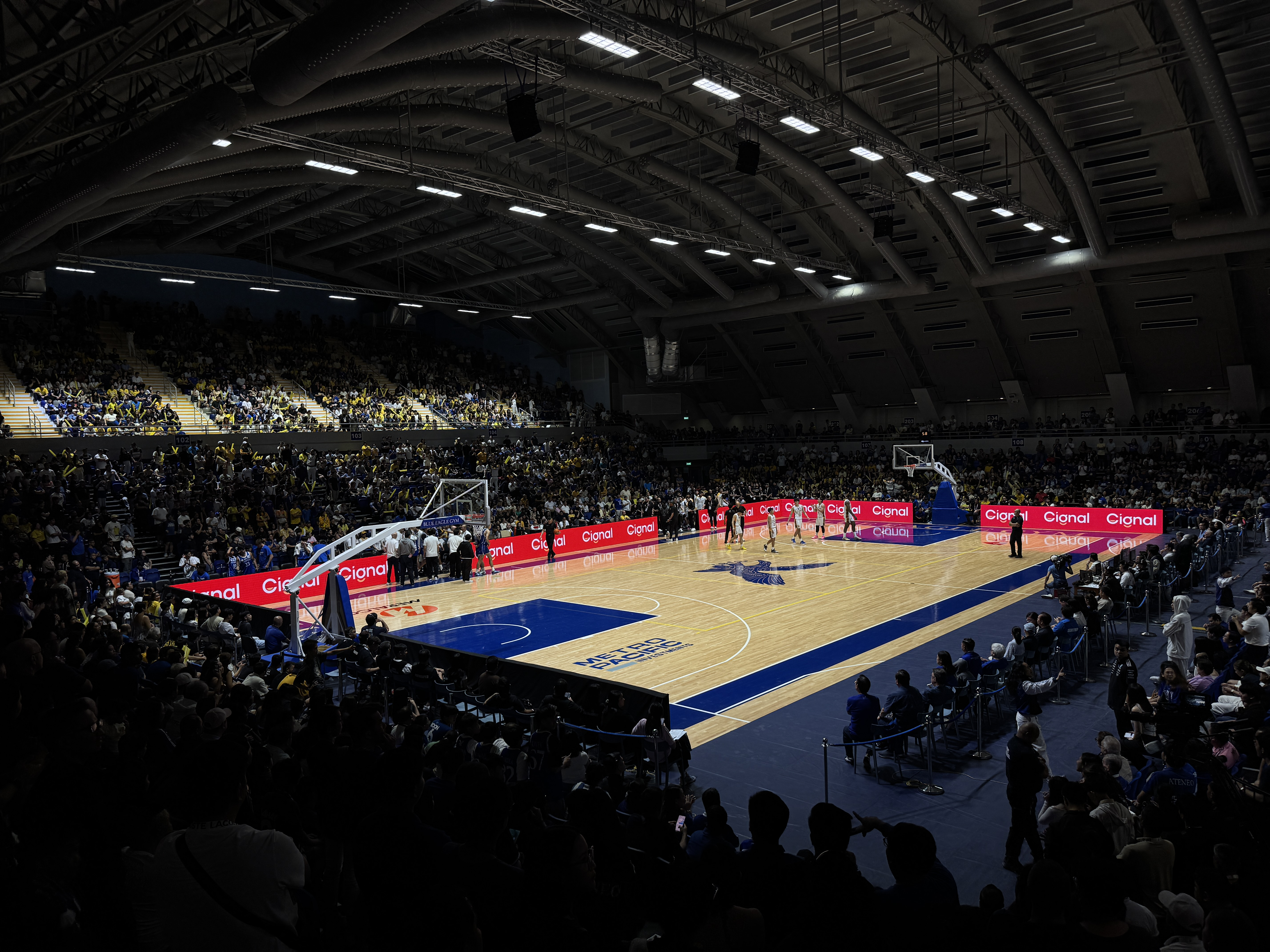
Blue Eagle Gym during UAAP Season 88 in 2025

The Blue Eagle Gym was inaugurated on December 3, 1949, as either the Ateneo de Manila Gymnasium or the Loyola Center, about three years before the Ateneo de Manila University moved from its Manila campus to its current main campus in Loyola Heights, Quezon City, in 1952. The gym was constructed under the direction of Jesuit priest and Ateneo rector William F. Masterson.

In the 1990s, Ricky Palou the University Athletics Office director oversaw a renovation of the gymnasium in the late 1990s. By the year 2000, the venue was already known by its current name, Blue Eagle Gym.

In 2019, Ateneo entered a sponsorship deal with Firefly LED ahead of a planned renovation. The renovation which, commenced in September 2023, cost ₱460 million and was led by architect Ike Madamba. It focused on dealing with the venue's poor acoustics, adding an indoor running track, and installing retractable seats and air conditioning. The work was completed in September 2025, ahead of the Ateneo Blue Eagles' return to its own venue for the UAAP Season 88 basketball tournament.

After the renovations were completed, the gymnasium has since hosted the University's graduation rites for the Grade School, Senior High School, Collegiate, and Graduate School levels, as well as the Junior High School closing ceremony.

In the October 18, 2026 game day of UAAP Season 89 basketball tournaments, referees had to call officials' time outs due to the shot clock not synching with the game clock; moves coaches say disrupted players and the game. Coaches also revealed that at least one locker room did not have a functioning air-conditioner.

== Facilities ==
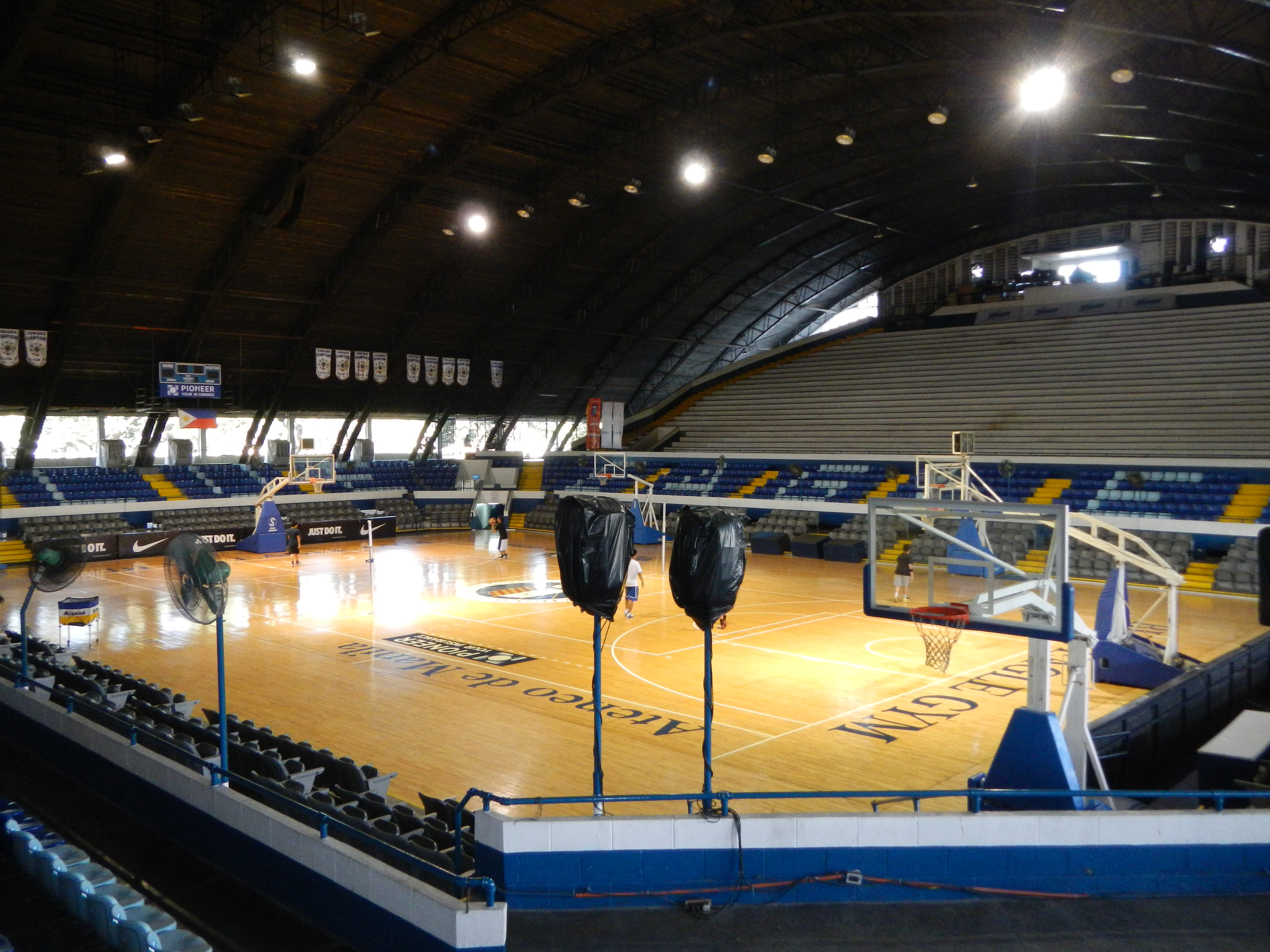
Interior of the Blue Eagle Gym in 2013

The Blue Eagle Gym has a capacity of 4,850 seats for sporting events which can be expanded to 7,000 for academic and cultural events. It also hosts the university’s athletics office, an indoor running track, locker rooms, and three regulation-sized basketball courts. Since 2025, the venue is fully air-conditioned.

As part of its renovation, the LED jumbotron was unveiled in February 2026 in time for the second round of the UAAP Season 88 19U basketball tournament.

== Tenants ==
As the Blue Eagle Gym is a facility owned by the Ateneo de Manila University, the Ateneo Blue Eagles uses it. This includes the events under the University Athletic Association of the Philippines (UAAP). The venue is also used for non-sporting events in the University, such as graduation rites and various gatherings.

It has historically served as a venue for the National Collegiate Athletic Association games as well as some games of the Philippine Basketball Association during its early years. The MBA’s Manila Metrostars also used the Blue Eagle Gym as their homecourt for the 1998-99 inaugural season before moving to the San Andres Sports Complex in Manila.

On December 1, 2025, the venue was used as the homecourt for the Philippines men's national basketball team in the first window of the 2027 FIBA Basketball World Cup qualifiers as they defeated Guam, 95–71.
