= Davao City Recreation Center =

Indoor arena in Davao City, Philippines

- Interactive map of Davao City Recreation Center
- Location: Davao City, Philippines
- Coordinates: 7°3′42″N 125°36′39″E
- Capacity: 2,500

Tenants
- Alab Pilipinas (2016–2017); Davao Occidental Tigers (MPBL) (2019–2025)

The Davao City Recreation Center formerly known as the Almendras Gym is an indoor arena in Davao City, Philippines.

It is situated along Quimpo Boulevard and has a capacity of 2,500 people.

From 2007 to 2010, the indoor arena underwent a renovation. Part of the renovation was the installment of an air-conditioning system in the sports facility. The sports venue hosted the 2015 Discovery Women’s Basketball Invitational.

Alab Pilipinas uses the Davao City Recreation Center as one of its home venues for the 2016-17 season of the ASEAN Basketball League.
