= Olivarez College =

Private college in Parañaque, Philippines

- Dalubhasaang Olivarez (Filipino)
- Former names: Olivarez School of Nursing (1976–1978); Olivarez Junior College (1978–1980)
- Motto: "Educating the Mind, Body and Soul"
- Type: Private, nonsectarian
- Established: 1976
- President: Dr. Pablo R. Olivarez
- Location: Parañaque Campus: Dr. Santos Avenue, Parañaque, Metro Manila, Philippines; Tagaytay Campus: Olivarez Plaza, Barangay San Jose, Tagaytay, Cavite, Philippines; 14°28′46″N 120°59′47″E
- Colors: Gold, Red and Green
- Nickname: Olivarez Sea Lions
- Sporting affiliations: UCAL
- Website: www.olivarezcollege.edu.ph
- Location in Metro Manila Location in Luzon Location in the Philippines

The Olivarez College (Filipino: Dalubhasaang Olivarez), also known as simply Olivarez or OC, is a private, nonsectarian college along Dr. A. Santos Avenue, Parañaque, Philippines that offers academic programs in basic education, junior and high school, undergraduate, graduate and technical education levels. Founded in 1976, Olivarez College is the only school in Parañaque City that is accredited by the Philippine Accrediting Association of Schools, Colleges and Universities (PAASCU) and the Philippine Association of Colleges and Universities - Commission on Accreditation (PACUCOA). It is a member of the Universities and Colleges Athletic Association (UCAA) and National Capital Region Athletic Association (NCRAA).

== History ==
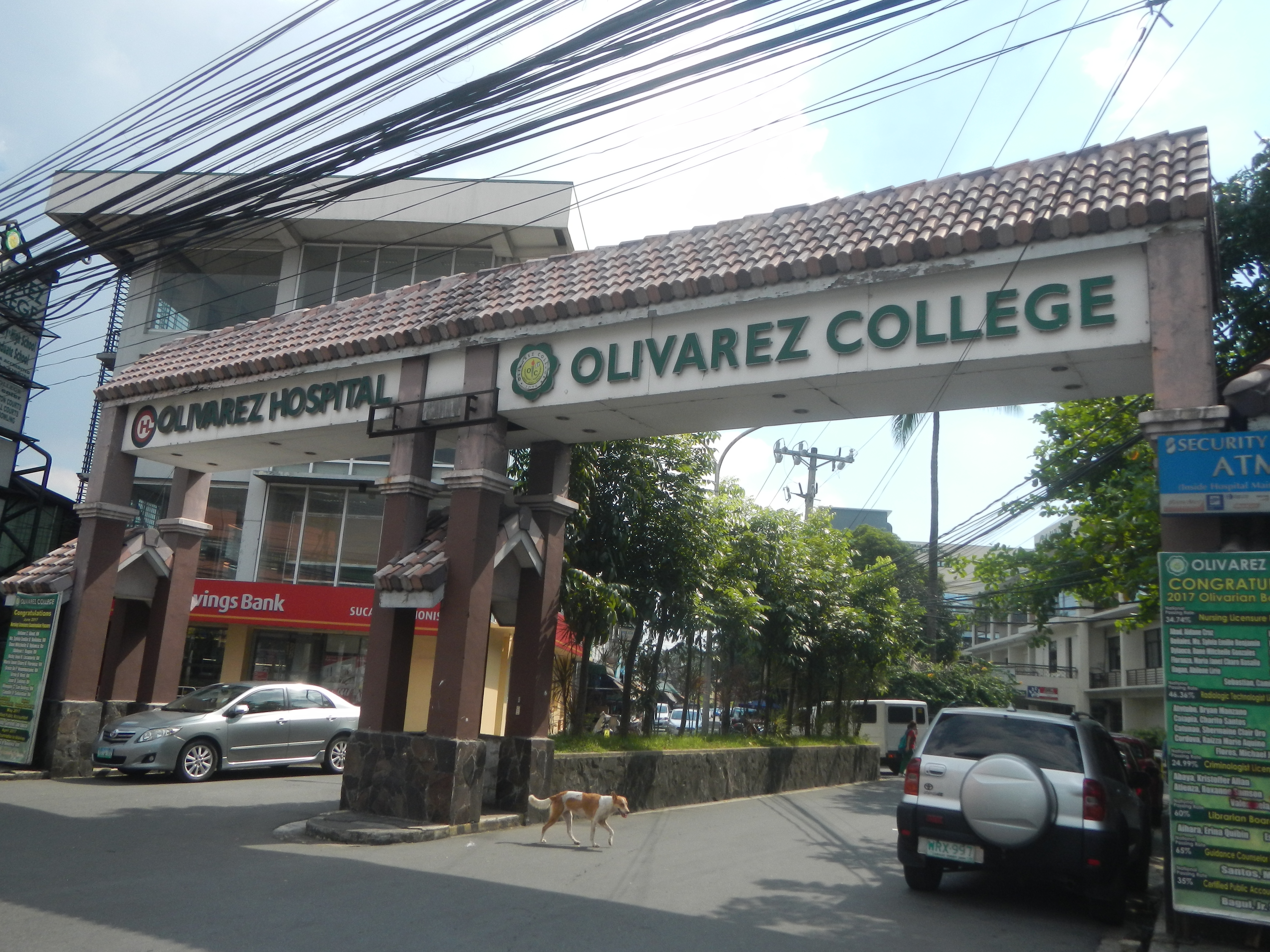
Olivarez College arch gate

=== Early history ===
Dr. Pablo Olivarez and his wife, the late Dr. Rosario de Leon-Olivarez, pioneered in the development of the community when they put up Olivarez General Hospital in 1975. Being medical practitioners, they established the Olivarez School of Nursing on April 30, 1976.

In 1978, Olivarez School of Nursing was changed to Olivarez Junior College: instituting the College of Liberal Arts (now College of Arts and Sciences), College of Commerce (now College of Business Administration), and Health Related Courses (now College of Health Related Sciences).

In 1980, the school became Olivarez College and began offering Graduate School programs in 1992. In 1993, Liberal Arts, Commerce and Nursing programs were granted Level II accreditation status by the PACUCOA. Likewise, the Basic Education Department was awarded PAASCU level I status in February 2002 and level II accreditation status on May 14, 2004.

In 2003, the board of trustees decided to start a campus in Tagaytay offering the courses BS Nursing, BS Business Administration major in Marketing Management, Bachelor in Elementary Education major in Early Childhood, BS Hotel and Restaurant Management, BS Information Technology, BS Accountancy, Short Courses like Associate in Computer Technology, Associate in Health Science Education and Caregiver.

=== Near cancellation to present ===
In 2013, the Commission on Higher Education (CHED) almost closed Olivarez's School of Nursing due to its low performance in its nursing licensure examinations. The college said in a statement that this was "politically motivated and candidly baseless".

At present, the school administrators are working toward making Olivarez College achieve university status, in accordance to the vision of the founder and president of the school, Pablo Olivarez.

== Parañaque campus ==
=== Main buildings ===
The Pablo R. Olivarez Hall houses the College Office of Student Affairs (OSA), which handles student programs and concerns, the Guidance and Testing Center (GTC), school clinic, audio-visual room, auditorium, botanical garden, nursing arts laboratories, and speech laboratories. Adjacent to this hall is the bookstore. The Rosario L. Olivarez Hall meanwhile is where the Integrated Basic Education Department (IBED) OSA head holds office, and has computer laboratories for IBED students. There is also the Saturnina de Leon Hall, which has computer libraries for senior high students. Each hall contains a library.

=== Olivarez Coliseum ===
Situated near the Rosario L. Olivarez Hall (IBED Building), the Olivarez Coliseum (also known as Olivarez College Gymnasium) can hold 5,000 spectators. It is the home arena of Olivarez College's Sea Lions, who currently compete in the Universities and Colleges Athletic League (UCAL), and has also hosted its share of Philippine Basketball Association (PBA) games. Other tenants include the San Miguel Beermen and San Miguel Alab Pilipinas of the ASEAN Basketball League (ABL), and the Parañaque Patriots of the Maharlika Pilipinas Basketball League (MPBL). Non-sporting events held at the Coliseum include pageants, campaign rallies, and more.

=== Other sports facilities ===
Beside the Saturnina De Leon Hall (formerly HRM building), there is a smaller gymnasium that can hold 2,000 spectators and is mainly used for the school's physical education classes. It features a basketball court which can be converted to several playing courts for volleyball, badminton, and other sports.

Located beside the Olivarez Coliseum is a half-Olympic size swimming pool. They also have tennis courts, which host University Athletic Association of the Philippines (UAAP) tennis matches.

=== Filming ===
The Parañaque campus was among the filming locations for the 2011 film Way Back Home.

== Academics ==
=== Program Offerings ===
GRADUATE SCHOOL

- Doctor in Business Administration (DBA)
- Master in Business Administration (MBA)*
- Master in Public Administration (MPA)
- Master of Arts in Education (MAEd) major in Educational Management*
- Master of Arts in Education (MAEd) major in Guidance and Counseling*

COLLEGE OF CRIMINOLOGY, ARTS and SCIENCES

- Bachelor of Science in Criminology (BSC)
- Bachelor of Library and information Science (BLIS)
- Bachelor of Arts in Communication (ABComm)*
- Bachelor of Arts major in Psychology (ABPsy)*
- Bachelor of Arts major in Political Science (ABPolSci)*

COLLEGE OF EDUCATION

- Bachelor of Elementary Education (BEEd)*
- Bachelor of Early Childhood Education (BECEd)
- Bachelor of Physical Education (BPEd)
- Bachelor of Secondary Education (BSEd) major in English*
- Bachelor of Secondary Education (BSEd) major in Filipino*
- Teacher Certificate Program

COLLEGE OF BUSINESS AND ACCOUNTANCY

- Bachelor of Science in Accountancy (BSA)
- Bachelor of Science in Internal Audit (BSIA)
- Bachelor of Science in Business Administration major in Marketing Management (BSBA-MM)*
- Bachelor of Science in Business Administration major in Operations Management (BSBA-OM)*
- Bachelor of Science in Customs Administration (BSCA)

COLLEGE OF TOURISM AND HOSPITALITY MANAGEMENT

- Bachelor of Science in Hospitality Management (BSHM)*
- Bachelor of Science in Tourism Management (BSTM)

COLLEGE OF COMPUTER STUDIES

- Bachelor of Science in Computer Science (BSCS)
- Bachelor of Science in Information Technology (BSIT)
- Associate in Computer Technician (ACT)

COLLEGE OF HEALTH SCIENCES EDUCATION (CHSE)

- Bachelor of Science in Nursing (BSN)*
- Bachelor of Science in Radiologic Technology (BSRT)
- Bachelor of Science in Physical Therapy (BSPT)
- Bachelor of Science in Midwifery (BSM)

TESDA COURSES

- Caregiving NC II
- Contact Center Service NC II

INTEGRATED BASIC EDUCATION DEPARTMENT

- Pre School
- Grade School*
- Junior High School*
- Senior High School

(*)PAASCU/PACUCOA Accredited

=== Collaborations ===
OC collaborates with:

- Esa Unggul University

== Athletics ==
Olivarez College is a member of the National Capital Region Athletic Association (NCRAA). It is one of the founding members of the Universities and Colleges Athletic Association (UCAA).

Their basketball team, the Olivarez Sea Lions, has won the National Capital Region Athletic Association (NCRAA) men's basketball title in 2010, 2013, and 2018. Chris Lalata, an alumnus of Olivarez, was drafted in the second round in the PBA season 47 draft.

== Notable alumni ==
- Edwin Olivarez - Representative and former Mayor of Parañaque City
- Sunday Salvacion - PBA Player
- Janna Dominguez - Actress
- Karen Gallman - Miss Intercontinental 2018
- Lloyd Cafe Cadena - Author, vlogger, YouTuber
