= Caloocan Sports Complex =

Public indoor arena in Caloocan, Philippines

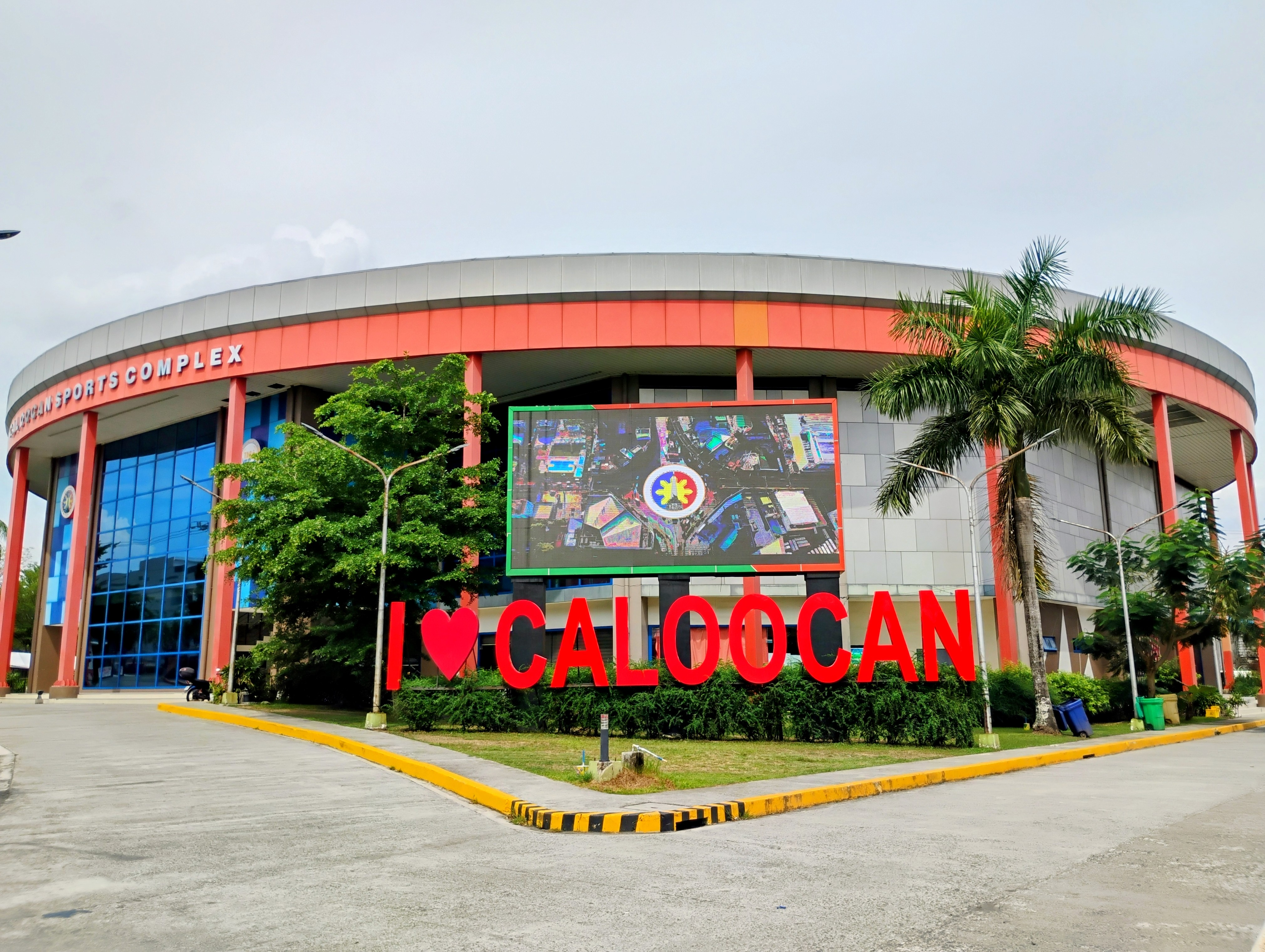
- Indoor arena at Caloocan Sports Complex
- Interactive map of Caloocan Sports Complex
- Location: Malapitan Road, Bagumbong, Caloocan, Philippines
- Coordinates: 14°45′01.7″N 121°01′14.9″E
- Owner: Caloocan City Government
- Operator: Caloocan City Government
- Acreage: 4,144,698.6 acres (16,773.000 km^{2})

Construction
- Groundbreaking: 2015
- Opened: December 8, 2017; 8 years ago

Tenants
- Philippine Basketball Association (2019–present); ASEAN Basketball League (2018–2020); Philippine Super Liga (2018–2020); Caloocan Batang Kankaloo (MPBL) (2018–present); Caloocan AM Spikers (MPVA) (2023–present)

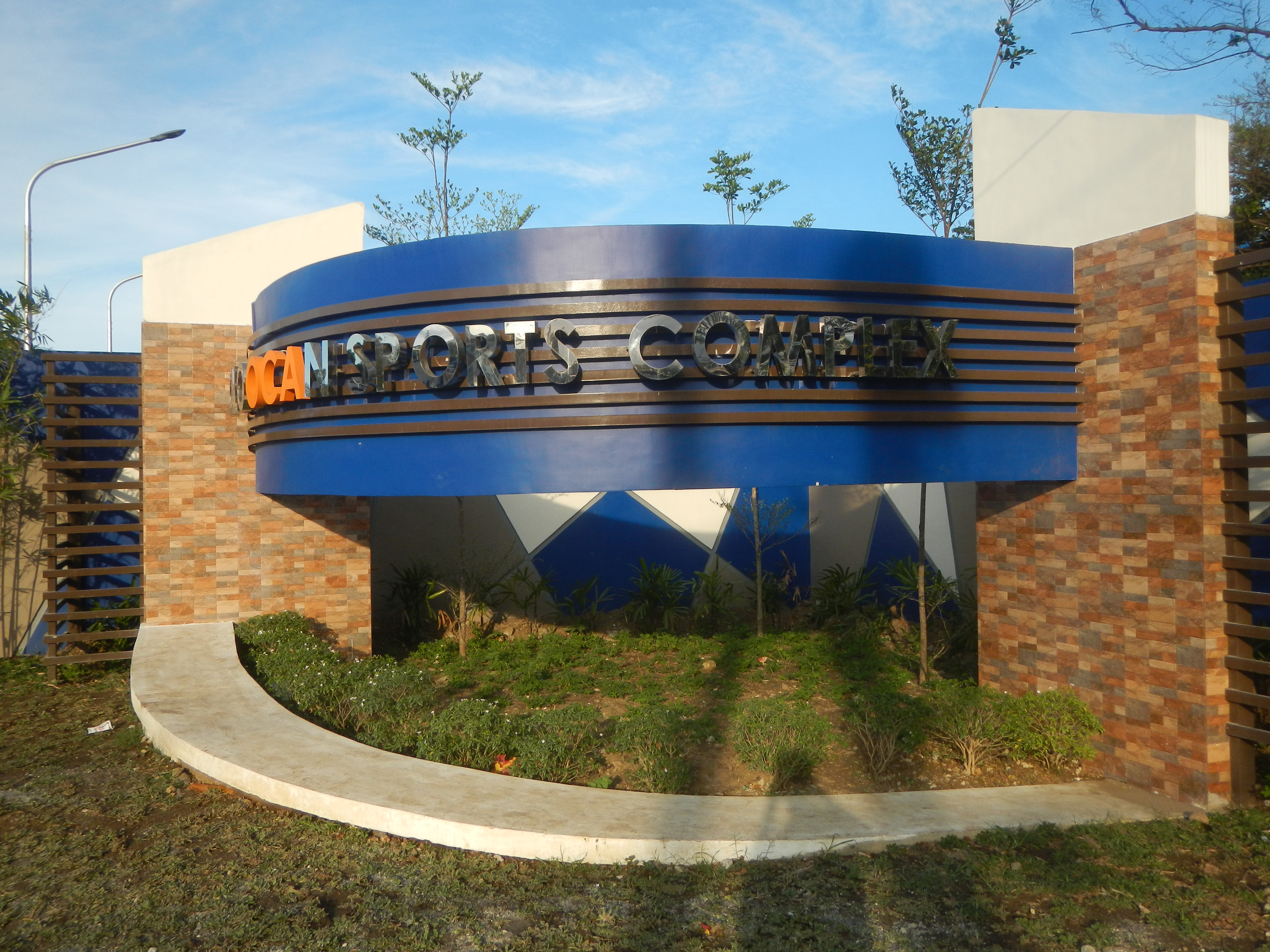
Gates of the Complex in March 2018

The Caloocan Sports Complex is a sports complex located in Bagumbong, Caloocan, Philippines. The first of its kind in the city, it consists of a 3,000-seater indoor sporting arena, semi-Olympic-sized swimming pool, tennis courts, a jogging path, twelve gazebos, leisure park, and badminton court.

Built and operated by the Caloocan city government, it currently serves as the home venue of the Caloocan Batang Kankaloo of the Maharlika Pilipinas Basketball League (MPBL) and the Caloocan AM Spikers of the Maharlika Pilipinas Volleyball Association (MPVA). The venue has also hosted games of the ASEAN Basketball League (ABL) and the Philippine Super Liga, alongside various boxing events, conventions, concerts, sports festivals, and other events by the city government. During the COVID-19 pandemic, the complex was used as a COVID-19 vaccination site.

Construction of the sports complex began in 2015. It opened on December 8, 2017, during the term of Mayor Oscar Malapitan.

== Notable events ==
- Dream Maker Grand Finale (February 12, 2023)
- 2023 MPBL playoffs: North Division First Round – games 2 and 3 (October 13 and 20, 2023)
- 2025 Pilipinas Super League Finals – games 1 and 3 (February 27 and March 3, 2025)

Preceded by first venue	Home of the Caloocan Batang Kankaloo; 2018–present	Succeeded by current
