= San Andres Sports Complex =

Sports venue in San Andres, Manila, Philippines

- San Andres Gym
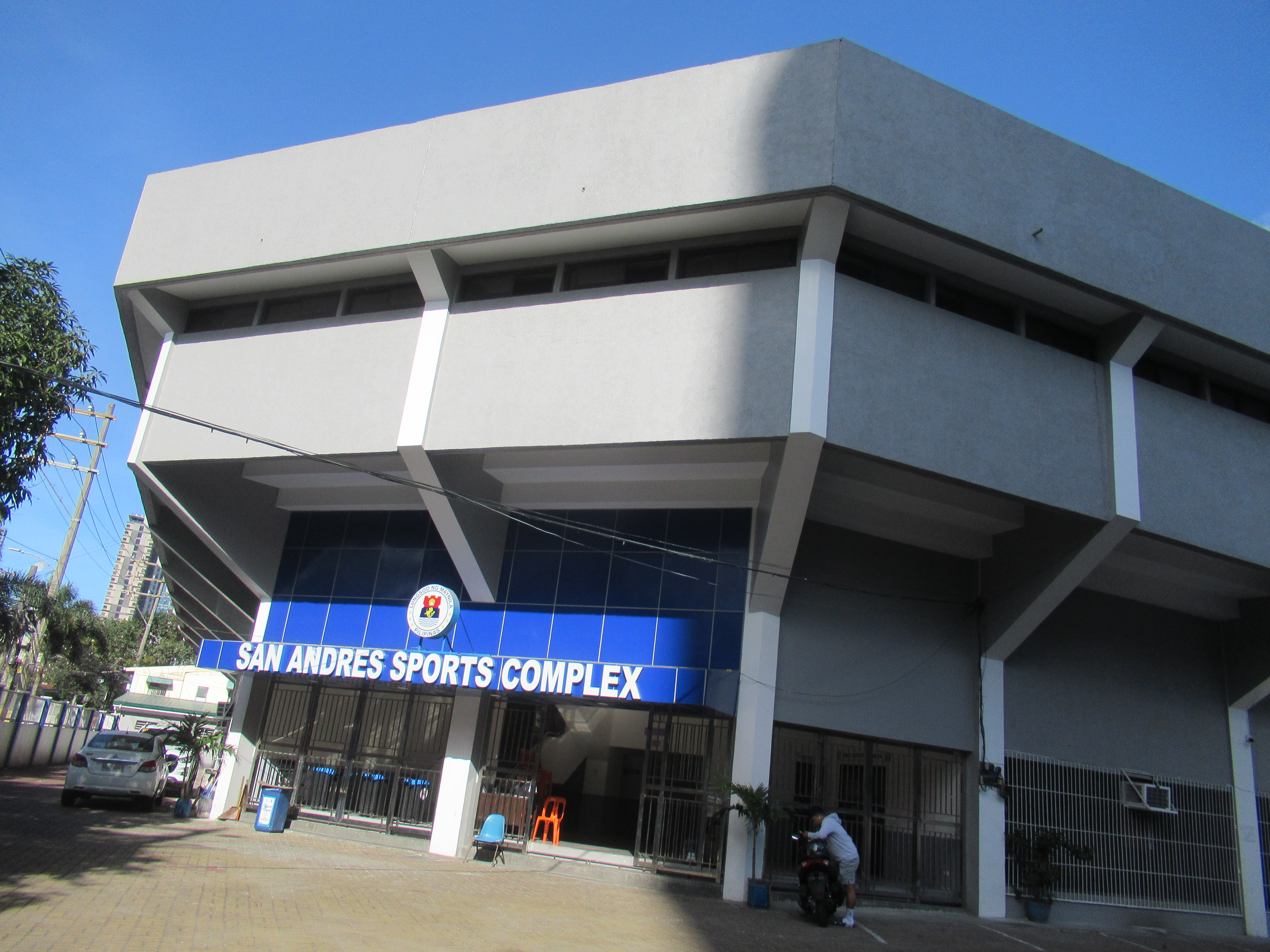
- The sports complex in 2023
- Interactive map of San Andres Sports Complex
- Former names: Mail and More Arena
- Location: Manila, Philippines
- Coordinates: 14°34′08″N 120°59′16″E
- Owner: Manila city government
- Operator: Manila city government
- Capacity: 5,000
- Type: Indoor arena

Tenants
- Manila Metrostars (MBA) (1999–2001); Manila Stars (MPBL/PSL) (2018–present); NCAA (2023–present); UAAP (2023–present)

The San Andres Sports Complex, also known as San Andres Gym and formerly as Mail and More Arena, is a sporting venue along San Andres Street in Malate, Manila, Philippines, owned by the local government of Manila.

== Usage ==
=== Sports ===
The basketball arena was the home venue of the Manila Metrostars of the Metropolitan Basketball Association in 2000 when it was then known as the "Mail and More Arena" due to a naming rights agreement.

The Manila city government under Mayor Lito Atienza renovated the complex in 2005.

The gymnasium hosted wrestling at the 2005 Southeast Asian Games.

The San Andres Sports Complex was one of two venues of the 2009 Asian Men's Seniors Volleyball Championship, the other being the nearby Ninoy Aquino Stadium.

John Riel Casimero successfully defended his World Boxing Organization interim bantamweight championship against Mexican Cesar Ramirez at the San Andres Sports Complex in 2019 via tenth-round knockout. The sports complex was also used as a public viewing venue of Manny Pacquiao's fights.

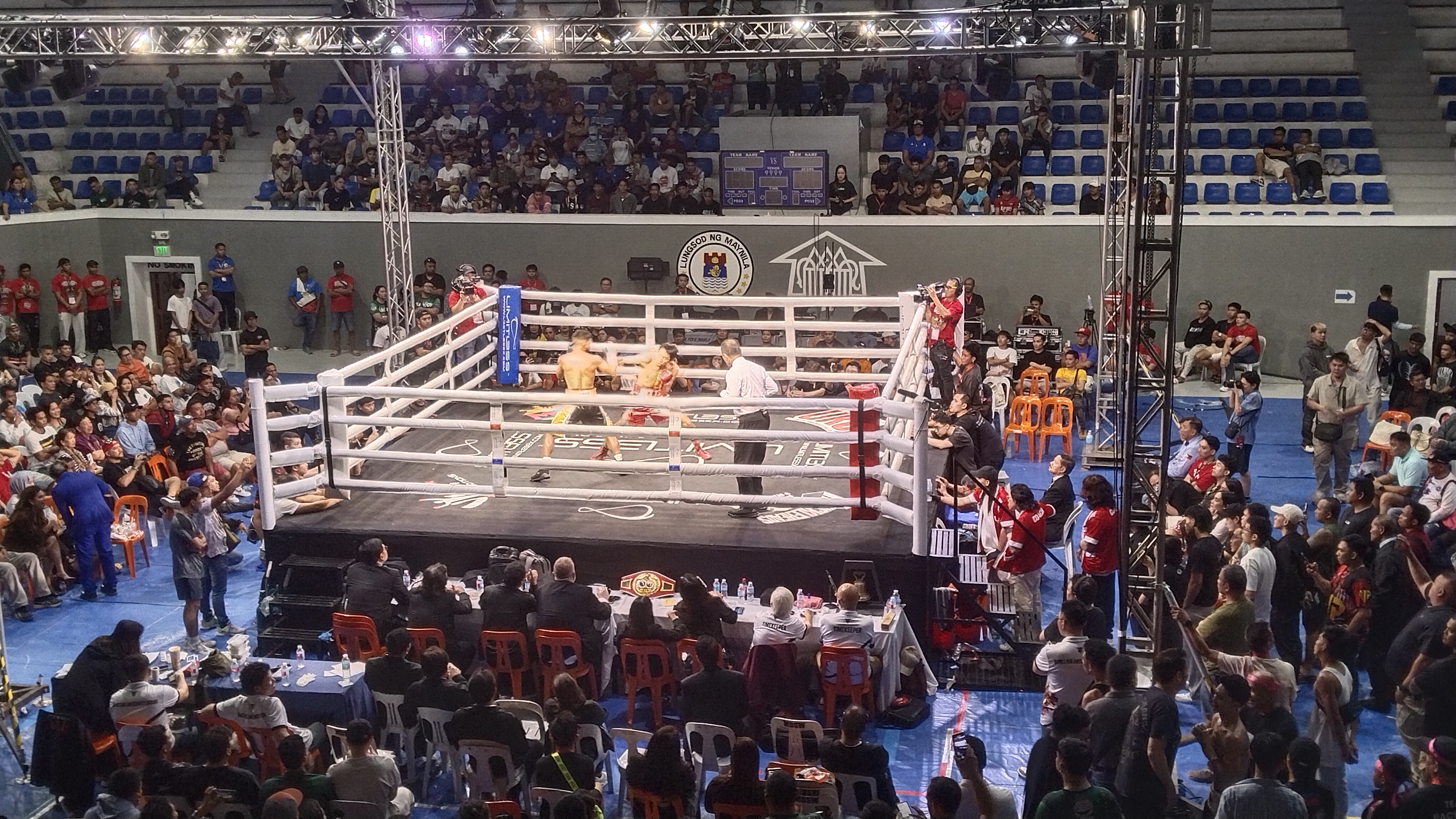
A boxing match between Rex Tso and Sagar Chouchan within the complex during the Thrilla in Manila II Countdown, October 2025

The National Collegiate Athletic Association (Philippines) held its seniors volleyball and the latter part of its juniors basketball tournaments in the venue in 2023. In the same year, the University Athletic Association of the Philippines opened its high school basketball tournament at the venue.

IBF mini flyweight champion Pedro Taduran is set to defend against undefeated challenger Christian Balunan in October 26, 2025, on Thrilla in Manila II Countdown.

=== Other ===
The local government of Manila uses the venue for other purposes.

The Philippine Councilors League used the sports complex as a venue of its general assembly in 1992.

The canvassing of votes during the 2019 Manila local elections, wherein former vice mayor Isko Moreno was proclaimed the winner, was held there.

It was later used as a quarantine facility during the COVID-19 pandemic in 2020, then as a COVID-19 vaccination site in 2021. The venue was used as a distribution center of Christmas packages by the local government in 2022.

Preceded by first venue Paco Arena	Home of the Manila Batang Sampaloc; 2018–2020; 2023–present	Succeeded by Paco Arena current
