= Alonte Sports Arena =

Sports arena in Biñan, Laguna, Philippines

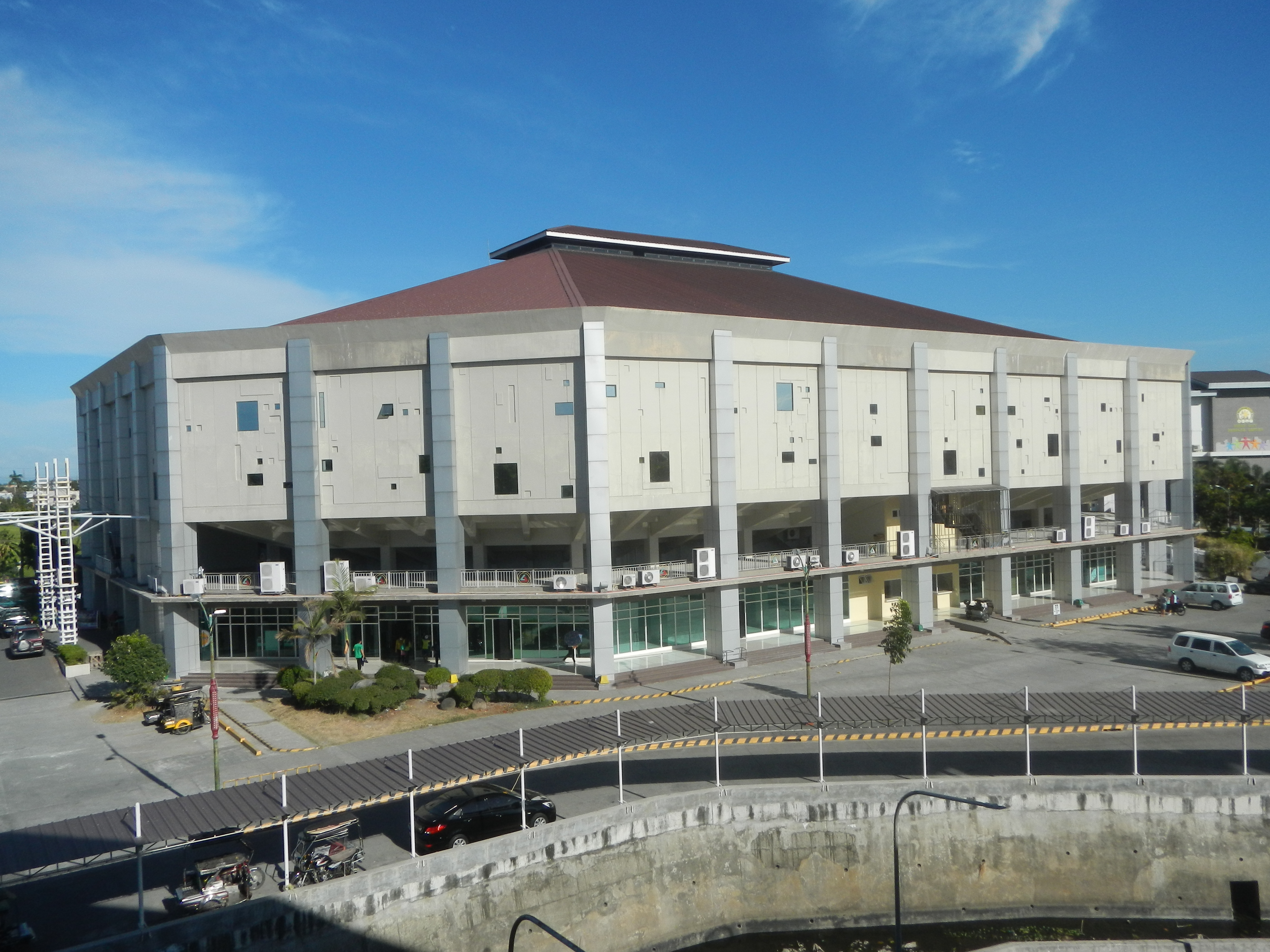
- Alonte Sports Arena in 2018
- Interactive map of Alonte Sports Arena
- Location: Zapote, Biñan, Laguna, Philippines
- Coordinates: 14°18′50″N 121°4′45″E
- Owner: Biñan City Government
- Capacity: 6,500

Construction
- Groundbreaking: 2010; 16 years ago
- Opened: December 1, 2013; 12 years ago

Tenants
- Philippine Basketball Association (out-of-town games); Philippine Super Liga; Biñan Tatak Gel (MPBL) (2018–present); Laguna Pistons (NBL) (2018–2022); Biñan Tatak Gel Volley Angels (MPVA) (2024–present); Biñan Tatak Gel Angels (WMPBL) (2026–present)

The Alonte Sports Arena is an indoor arena in Biñan, Laguna, Philippines, with a capacity of 6,500 people. It is the home arena of the Biñan Tatak Gel of the Maharlika Pilipinas Basketball League (MPBL) and Pilipinas Super League (PSL). It has also hosted matches of the Philippine Basketball Association (PBA) and the defunct Philippine Super Liga. It also serves as an evacuation centre for the city. It is adjacent to the Biñan Football Stadium and the Biñan City Hall.

The construction of the sports arena began in 2010 and it was officially inaugurated on December 1, 2013, by then Vice President Jejomar Binay and Biñan Mayor Marlyn Alonte-Naguiat.

The arena was the venue of the 2019 Asia-Oceania Floorball Cup. During the COVID-19 pandemic, it was used as a mega quarantine facility and later as a COVID-19 vaccination site.

The arena also hosts government offices, namely the Laguna Regional Trial Court Branches 152 to 155, the city's Commission on Elections office, and the Laguna provincial office of the Philippine Drug Enforcement Agency.

Events and tenants
Preceded by Santa Rosa Sports Complex; Laguna Sports Complex	Home of the Biñan Tatak Gel; 2024–present	Succeeded by current
Preceded by Mayor Vitaliano D. Agan Coliseum	Host of the MPBL All-Star Game; 2025	Succeeded by TBA
