= List of Philippine sports controversies =

This is a list of major sports controversies in the Philippines or concerning Filipino sportspeople. These controversies cover areas such as rules, match fixing, cheating, sportsmanship, doping and sport administration. They have generated large scale media coverage over a period of time and may have resulted in a large scale inquiry. These controversies affect the integrity of sport. This excludes non-sporting controversy that happened to involve sportspeople.

== List ==
=== Involving athletes and coaches ===
Sport	Dates	Summary
Football	1917	The match between the national football teams of the Philippines and China at the 1917 Far Eastern Championship Games was marred by a brawl. After China scored their fourth goal through a penalty kick, the Philippine goalkeeper punched the goalscorer starting a brawl and later forfeiture of the Philippines.
Baseball	1992	The Zamboanga baseball team was stripped of its 1992 Little League title which it originally won after beating Long Beach 15–4 in the final in Williamsport, Pennsylvania. Zamboanga forfeited the match and Long Beach was awarded a 6–0 win after it was found out the team fielded ineligible players with only six of the Philippine team's players satisfying the residency eligibility.
Basketball	2018	Kiefer Ravena who played for the national team against Japan in the 2019 FIBA Basketball World Cup qualifiers was suspended from FIBA-related activities including competition after testing positive for methylhexanamine, 1,3-Dimethylbutylamine and higenamine, substances prohibited by WADA. Ravena attributed the positive testing to him drinking Blackstone Labs DUST in lieu of his usual pre-work out drink C4 after he ran out supplies of the latter drink. FIBA attributed the violation to Ravena's lack of anti-doping education. This led to the Philippine Olympic Committee and the Philippine Sports Commission in improving their anti-doping campaign and Ravena himself to start spreading awareness on banned substances after drinking a beverage which he didn't know contained banned substance.
Basketball	2018	Philippines–Australia basketball brawl – The Philippines and Australia figured out in a brawl during a 2019 FIBA Basketball World Cup qualifier at the Philippine Arena in Bocaue. These led to the suspension of both Filipino and Australian players and part of the Filipino coaching staff.
Basketball	2019	The Soccsksargen Marlins of the Maharlika Pilipinas Basketball League was suspended by the league over game-fixing allegations. League commissioner Kenneth Duremdes then filed criminal complaints to 21 individuals who are involved in the scandal before the Department of Justice. In 2021, the DOJ would indict chargers to 17 individuals.
Basketball	2020	The UST Growling Tigers then-led by coach Aldin Ayo held training session in Sorsogon violating quarantine protocols imposed by the national government amidst the COVID-19 pandemic. Allegations of such training session taking place surfaced after team captain CJ Cansino's departure from UST. The resulting controversy led to the resignation of several other UST players as well as Ayo himself.
Basketball	2021	2021 Pilipinas VisMin Super Cup game-fixing scandal – The game between the ARQ-Lapu-Lapu City Heroes and Siquijor Mystics in the 2021 Pilipinas VisMin Super Cup 1st Conference was called off at half-time with the score line of 27-13, with Lapu-Lapu City leading. The official reason for the halt was due to a power interruption; but the Games and Amusements Board officials on site immediately conducted an investigation over the conduct of the game. PBA players and other noted figures in Philippine basketball condemned the "lack of respect for the game". Title sponsors Bounty Agro Ventures said they could withdraw their support if not sanctions for erring parties would not be made and alleged there was game-fixing involved. The Siquijor Mystics were expelled from the league and players and officials from ARQ-Lapu-Lapu City Heroes were suspended.
Chess	2021	The Philippine team was disqualified from the FIDE Online Olympiad after it "was found to have allegedly violated rules on fair play." The team originally finished second behind Indonesia in Division 2, and would have been promoted to the Top Division. The National Chess Federation of the Philippines (NCFP) appealed the decision disputing the sanction's application to the whole team and suggesting disregarding the results of the single offending player in its 12-player team but FIDE remained firm in disqualifying the whole team. NCFP in response banned the player and any future offenders from its own online chess tournaments for a period of "not more than 15 years". Prior to the incident the NCFP only bans players for three months.

=== Leadership and organizational issues ===
Sport	Dates	Summary
Basketball	2014	Two exhibition matches were to be held as part of the PLDT HOME: The Last Home Stand charity event. The games were to feature the Philippine national team against a National Basketball Association selection team but was cancelled after NBA players who were set to participate were warned not take part in the event which was not recognized by the NBA.
Multi-sport	2016, 2018	2016 and 2018 Philippine Olympic Committee elections – Peping Cojuangco was reelected as President of the Philippine Olympic Committee unopposed after his only potential opponent Ricky Vargas was disqualified for not being an "active member" of the national sports body which Vargas' camp argued didn't equate to physical presence in board meetings as insisted by Cojuangco's camp. Vargas sought court intervention and had another elections held in 2018 under order of the court where Vargas won the presidency over Cojuangco. Leading to the 2018 election, Cojuangco alleged that the Philippine Olympic Committee would be suspended due to government interference due to the actions of the Vargas camp.
Football	2019	The Philippine Premier League folded after just a match day after Stallion Laguna and United Makati withdrew from the league alleging the organizers lacked professionalism and being nontransparent regarding the league affairs. Two other clubs of the league were ruled ineligible by the Philippine Football Federation due to licensing issues. The national football association revoked its sanction of the league leading to the revival of the Philippines Football League.
Tennis	2020	The International Tennis Federation (ITF) has urged the Philippine Tennis Association (PHILTA) to institute reforms to ensure all stakeholders and regional clubs are represented. The ITF imposed a two-year suspension on PHILTA for "unresolved representation issues and long-standing governance failings". The Philippine team was still able to play against Greece in the 2020 Davis Cup World Group II Play-offs. This followed an internal dispute among officials under the leadership of PHILTA President Antonio Cablitas with dissenting officials went on to form Unified Tennis Philippines The Philippine team was forced to withdraw from the 2020-21 Davis Cup. They were due to resume play in the Asia/Oceania Zone Group III.
