= Carlo Lastimosa =

Filipino basketball player (born 1990)

No. 22 – Biñan Tatak Gel
- Position: Shooting guard
- League: MPBL

Personal information
- Born: September 3, 1990 (age 36) Cagayan de Oro, Philippines
- Listed height: 6 ft 0 in (1.83 m)
- Listed weight: 182 lb (83 kg)

Career information
- High school: Ateneo de Cagayan (Cagayan de Oro)
- College: Benilde
- PBA draft: 2013: 2nd round, 20th overall pick
- Drafted by: Barako Bull Energy
- Playing career: 2013–present

Career history
- 2013–2015: Barako Bull Energy
- 2015–2016: Blackwater Elite
- 2016–2017: NLEX Road Warriors
- 2018: Kia Picanto / Columbian Dyip
- 2019–2020: Manila Stars
- 2021: Clarin Sto. Niño
- 2021: Manila Stars
- 2022: Pasig City / MCW Sports
- 2022–2023: Sta. Rosa Laguna Lions
- 2023–2024: Imus SV Squad
- 2024–present: Biñan Tatak Gel

Career highlights
- 3× PBA All-Star (2016–2018); MPBL All-Star (2022); NCAA Philippines Rookie of the Year (2010)

Carlo Dan Lastimosa (born September 3, 1990) is a Filipino professional basketball player for the Biñan Tatak Gel of the Maharlika Pilipinas Basketball League (MPBL). He was drafted 20th overall by the Barako Bull in the 2013 PBA draft.

== Early life ==
Lastimosa comes from a family of basketball players. He's the son of former PABL player Danny Lastimosa, brother of the former captain of the UST women's volleyball team, Pamela Lastimosa, and nephew of PBA Legend and three-time Mythical Team awardee, Jojo Lastimosa. It was only natural then that the younger Lastimosa started playing basketball at the young age of five in their family's residence in the city of Cagayan de Oro. Watching his uncle Jolas play professional basketball was a very big influence for Carlo to opt to make a career out of the sport later on and develop an ambition of following his uncle's footsteps by making it good in the PBA someday.

When he was young, he joined a MILO Best Training Center courtesy of his father. Jolas also trained him by teaching him certain slashing drills. He then joined the varsity team of Xavier University - Ateneo de Cagayan during his high school years, where he quickly became a subject of interest in the local basketball scene. He eventually participated in the Jesuits Athletic Meet, a basketball event between different Philippine Jesuit schools, back in 2007.

== College career ==
It was during his stint at the Jesuit Athletic Meet in CDO first got the eyes of the scouts for his talent on the hard court. He was later then recruited by the Ateneo Blue Eagles Glory Be Team but was later released due to academic reasons. Jose Rizal University was willing to absorb him but he opted out and began in trying out to other schools. He was then part of the College of St. Benilde of the NCAA and played there for two seasons. He chose Hotel and Restaurant Management as his course. He chose #6 as his jersey number, the number Jolas had worn and gotten retired in his PBA career.

In his rookie debut, Lastimosa had 13 points in a win over the Arellano Chiefs. In a loss to JRU, he had 19 points, five assists, two steals and two rebounds, but only scored a single point in the fourth quarter. He then had 20 points against the San Sebastian Stags, but fouled out of that game and CSB lost. In a close loss to the Mapúa Cardinals, he scored 21 points, including a three-pointer that sent the game into overtime, but couldn't score in overtime and also had five turnovers in that extra period. CSB ended the first round of eliminations with a win over the Perpetual Help Altas in which he scored 21 points. In a second round loss to the San Beda Red Lions, he scored 26 points. He was able to help CSB get a win over the EAC Generals with his 19 points. That season, he won Rookie of the Year.

Lastimosa missed the start of Season 87 due to a throat infection. In a loss to San Sebastian, he scored 20 points. In a loss to San Beda, he had 19 points, but missed what could have been the game-winning floater. He scored a season-high 30 points in a win over JRU. Halfway through the season, he left the team due to a misunderstanding on school policy between his family and the school management. He then returned at the end of the season.

Lastimosa started CSB's Season 88 campaign with a win by scoring 10 points in the fourth quarter. In a loss to San Beda, he scored 21 points. He followed that with 22 points in a loss to San Sebastian. At the end of their season, he announced that he would not return to CSB.

== Professional career ==
=== Barako Bull Energy (2013–2015) ===
He was drafted 20th overall by Barako Bull in the 2013 PBA draft. In his professional debut, during the final moments of Barako Bull's 2013–14 PBA Philippine Cup game against Air21, he was hit right in the face by Wynne Arboleda shortly after stripping the ball off the veteran Express guard. In a win over the GlobalPort Batang Pier, he scored 12 points and hit a clutch three-pointer. He had 11 points in a loss to the Alaska Aces, which gave Barako a record of 5–9 and with a higher quotient, the sixth seed. In the Commissioner's Cup, he took on more responsibility as Barako traded away lead guard Jonas Villanueva. He scored 10 points in a win over the Meralco Bolts, then scored another 10 points in a loss to Air21.

In a loss to the San Miguel Beermen during the 2014–15 Philippine Cup, Lastimosa scored 12 points. In a win over the Blackwater Elite, he scored 16 points. He scored 16 points again in a loss to the Talk 'N Text Tropang Texters during the Commissioner's Cup. In the Governors' Cup, he scored a season-high 18 points.

=== Blackwater Elite (2015–2016) ===
On July 2, 2015, Lastimosa was traded by the Barako Bull Energy to Blackwater Elite in exchange for Brian Heruela. Lastimosa's arrival at Blackwater earned him more minutes, owing to lack of pure scorers in the team. In a 2015–16 Philippine Cup game against Meralco, he scored 11 points, 3 rebounds, an assist, and a steal off the bench and also made the game-winning floater. He then led the team with 18 points in a loss to Talk 'N Text. On November 29, 2015, he scored his first 30+ performance when he scored 31 points, four boards, four assists, and one steal in a loss to GlobalPort. On December 11, 2015, he scored his conference-high 38 points, while making 14 out of 20 field goal attempts (5 out of 8 from beyond the arc). He helped Blackwater get into the quarterfinals for the first time in franchise history with 14 points in a win over the Mahindra Enforcer. There, despite him scoring 35 points, five rebounds, and five assists, they lost to the Rain or Shine Elasto Painters. In that conference, he averaged 17 points, 3.3 rebounds, and 2.7 assists.

Lastimosa started the Commissioner's Cup with a career-high 39 points on 4-of-7 threes and went 9-of-10 from the free throw line and also collected 4 rebounds and 4 assists as a starter. However, that performance was not enough to give Blackwater a win over Talk 'N Text. He then led Blackwater to a win over the Alaska Aces with 24 points. In an overtime loss to the Phoenix Fuel Masters, he scored 28 points with eight triples, but after making a three-pointer when fouled in the last seconds of the game, missed the free throw that would have given Blackwater the win and prevented the game from heading into overtime. After the game, his coach, Leo Isaac, made comments in the team dugout that Lastimosa missed the free throw on purpose. During the conference, he was given a three-year extension by Blackwater. He ended the conference with 27 points on 12/18 shooting from the field. Despite Blackwater not making the playoffs, he was a candidate to win Best Player of the Conference with averages of 21.2 points, 3.7 rebounds, and 2.5 assists per game, but lost to Calvin Abueva.

In a Governors' Cup loss to Rain or Shine, Lastimosa scored 20 points off the bench. During the All-Star Weekend, he was the runner-up in the Obstacle Challenge (which Maverick Ahanmisi won), and contributed 21 points to the South All-Stars in his first-ever All-Star game. In a loss to Ginebra, he scored 21 points, but only made one three-pointer out of six attempts. They failed to make the playoffs for the Governors' Cup.

=== NLEX Road Warriors (2016–2017) ===
On October 26, 2016, Lastimosa was traded by the Blackwater Elite to the NLEX Road Warriors in exchange for James Forrester and a 2016 2nd-round pick. At NLEX, he got to be coached by Yeng Guiao and his uncle Jojo, who was an assistant coach there. In his first game with NLEX, he had 15 points, and although he missed several shots and free throws in the clutch, NLEX got a win over Alaska. In a loss to Blackwater, he scored a game-high 23 points, but was ejected in the fourth quarter. They then went on a five-game losing streak, but then got an upset win over TNT in which he led with 22 points, three rebounds, and three assists. In a loss to GlobalPort, he scored 19 points. Their losing continued in the Commissioner's Cup, as they started with a loss to Rain or Shine in which he scored 15 points. That season, he was chosen as an All-Star for the Mindanao team. In the Governors' Cup, he helped get NLEX its second straight win of the conference with 13 points, all in the first quarter. He then scored 14 points to help NLEX come from behind and get a win over Phoenix, their fourth straight win of the conference. In that conference, they got to the quarterfinals as the fifth seed with a 7–4 record, where they were eliminated by the Star Hotshots. NLEX relegated him to the unrestricted free agent list.

=== KIA Picanto / Columbian Dyip (2018) ===
Without a team to play for, Lastimosa considered playing in the Asean Basketball League (ABL) as an import for the Thai team, the Mono Vampire. During the 2017–18 Philippine Cup, he was signed by the KIA Picanto that would last until the end of that conference. Despite the team only having a 1–10 record, the team brought him back for the rest of the 2017–18 season. He got to play in the All-Star game during the 2018 All-Star Week, scoring 16 points off the bench in the Mindanao All-Stars win over Gilas Pilipinas. Before the start of the 2019 season, he was let go of by the team.

=== Manila Stars (2019–2020) ===
Lastimosa then signed with the Manila Stars. He scored 12 points in a win over the Quezon City Capitals. He then scored 20 points as Manila started the season 2–0. In a win over the Bulacan Kuyas, he led with 27 points as their record went up to 6–1. He then led Manila with 22 points, four rebounds and three assists in a win over the Marikina Shoemasters. Manila got into second place in the standings with a win over the Bacolod Master Sardines in which he had 22 points and five steals. He then led Manila in a rout over the Mindoro Tamaraws with 27 points, eight rebounds, and five assists. In a win over the Bacoor Strikers, he had 18 points, five boards, and three assists. In Game 1 of their quarterfinal series against the Pasig Sta. Lucia Realtors, he led with 23 points on 10-of-14 shooting. The following game, he had 21 points as Manila moved into the division semis. In Game 1 of their semis against the Makati Super Crunch, he made a clutch three-pointer and two free throws as he finished with 25 points, six assists, and three rebounds to get the win. However, he then was held to just seven points on 2-of-15 shooting in a Game 2 loss. In Game 3, he injured his right leg at the start of the game and could only watch as his team was eliminated in overtime.

=== Clarin Sto. Niño (2021) ===
In 2021, Lastimosa joined the Clarin Sto. Niño in the Pilipinas VisMin Super Cup 1st Conference. He led the team with 15 points in a win over the MisOr Brew Authoritea. He then scored 27 points on 8-of-15 shooting in a win over the Roxas Vanguards. Clarin started the season 5–0 with a win over the Kapatagan Buffalo Braves in which he made 22 points and six triples. In a win over Zamboanga City JPS, he led with 22 points, seven assists, and four steals. They ended the eliminations at 7–1, good for the second seed, with their only loss coming against the Basilan Peace Riders. In Game 1 of the playoffs against Zamboanga, he only had 12 points on 5-of-14 shooting. He bounced back the following game with 25 points, but his team still lost in overtime.

=== Manila Stars (2021) ===
Lastimosa closed out 2021 with a return to the Manila Stars in the 2021 MPBL Invitational tournament. In a win over the GenSan Warriors, he had an all-around stat line of 14 points, two rebounds, four assists and a steal in under 23 minutes of play while also finishing with a team-high plus-18. He then led with 14 points on 6-of-16 shooting along with five assists, two rebounds, and a steal over the Imus Buracai de Laya. However, a loss to Bulacan sent them to third place in their group, and unable to qualify for the playoffs.

=== Pasig City MCW Sports (2022) ===
In 2022, Lastimosa played for Pasig City MCW Sports in the MPBL Mumbaki Season. In their first game of the season, he scored 17 points in a loss to the Batangas City Embassy Chill. In a win over the San Juan Knights, he scored 22 points. They started the season 3–2 with a loss to the Zamboanga Master's Sardines in which he scored 19 points. Against Quezon City, he got a clutch steal then made a clutch floater that sent the game into overtime, where Pasig got the win. He was able to lead Pasig into the divisional semis by defeating Quezon City with 24 points, four rebounds, and two steals. There, they lost to San Juan in two games. That season, he was an All-Star Game starter and averaged 14 points a game.

=== Imus SV Squad (2023–2024) ===
In 2023, Lastimosa joined the Imus SV Squad. They started the season 2–3 with a loss to the Pampanga Giant Lanterns in which he had 12 points. In a win over the Iloilo United Royals, he led with 15 points, three rebounds, and an assist. In a win over the Bataan Risers, he had 16 points and made three triples. Against the Laguna Krah Asia, he contributed 14 points and four rebounds in a win over them. Imus held on to the seventh seed with a win over Marikina in which he led with 24 points. He then scored 29 points (his highest scoring output in his MPBL career) and three rebounds in a loss to Makati, as the team finished with a 15–13 record, good for the seventh spot in the South division. In the playoffs, they were defeated twice in the first round by Batangas.

== Career statistics ==
Legend
GP	Games played	MPG	Minutes per game
FG%	Field-goal percentage	3P%	3-point field-goal percentage	FT%	Free-throw percentage
RPG	Rebounds per game	APG	Assists per game	SPG	Steals per game
BPG	Blocks per game	PPG	Points per game	**Bold**	Career high

=== PBA ===
Year	Team	GP	MPG	FG%	3P%	FT%	RPG	APG	SPG	BPG	PPG
2013–14	Barako Bull	28	14.5	.359	.250	**.660**	1.9	1.3	.5	.1	5.1
2014–15	Barako Bull	32	12.2	.434	**.357**	.528	1.1	.6	.3	.0	6.9
2015–16	Blackwater	**34**	**26.2**	.436	.316	.642	**3.1**	**2.4**	**.6**	.1	**18.0**
2016–17	NLEX	33	16.5	**.453**	.140	.523	1.4	1.7	**.6**	**.2**	8.5
2017–18	KIA / Columbian	19	14.6	.346	.217	.733	1.3	1.8	.4	.1	6.1
Career		149	17.3	.423	.259	.608	1.8	1.6	.5	.1	9.4

=== NCAA ===
Year	Team	GP	MPG	FG%	3P%	FT%	RPG	APG	SPG	BPG	PPG
2010-11	CSB	16	**30.4**	.393	.164	.692	**4.8**	**2.6**	**1.3**	**.3**	**17.3**
2011-12	CSB	16	26.5	**.500**	**.272**	.692	3.3	1.8	1.2	.2	14.9
2012-13	CSB	12	24.7	.439	.154	**.773**	4.1	2.0	1.0	.1	15.8
Career		44	27.4	.440	.188	.706	3.6	2.1	1.4	.2	16.0
