= Pilipinas VisMin Super Cup =

Men's developmental and professional basketball league

- Sport: Basketball
- Founded: October 2020; 5 years ago
- First season: 2021 (1st)
- Folded: 2023
- Commissioner: Cris Bautista
- Motto: Ato Ni Bai
- Country: Philippines
- Continent: FIBA Asia (Asia)
- Last champions: MisOr Mustangs (1st title)
- Most titles: 5 teams (1 title each)
- Sponsor: Daily Fantasy

The Pilipinas VisMin Super Cup is a men's regional basketball league in the Philippines. The league comprises teams from the Visayas and Mindanao regions, similar to the Mindanao Visayas Basketball Association (MVBA) from 2006 until 2008, with the aim of searching for local, homegrown talent from those regions. The most recent tournament the league held was the 2023 Fiesta Pilar Championship.

== History ==
Plans for a basketball league in the island groups of Visayas and Mindanao were first reported in October 2020, noting that the league will begin play once COVID-19 pandemic restrictions are lifted. The VisMin Cup was first announced in January 2021 by chief operating officer Rocky Chan with Dondon Hontiveros as its ambassador. Hontiveros, who started his basketball career with the Cebu Gems of the Metropolitan Basketball Association, stated that they want to "bring back the days where basketball in [VisMin] was awesome, when people came in droves to watch the games and homegrown players were given a fair opportunity to play for their cities and provinces."

They aimed to start their first conference on April 9, 2021, with teams split into two "legs" or conferences for Visayas and Mindanao. In addition, games in each leg would take place in a neutral venue, with the initial plan being to host the Visayas leg in Cebu City and the Mindanao leg in the Zamboanga Peninsula. The Visayas leg was eventually moved to the municipality of Alcantara, Cebu due to the continued impact of the COVID-19 pandemic.

The first conference began as planned on April 9 with the Visayas leg. In just its first week of play, the league became the center of controversy when on April 14, a game between the Lapu-Lapu City Heroes and Siquijor Mystics raised suspicions due to missed free throws and easy shots and was called out for its "lack of respect" for the game. The league was at risk of losing title sponsor Chooks-to-Go, demanding the league to swiftly hand out sanctions. The controversy was resolved the following day after the league handed out numerous sanctions, including the expulsion of the entire Siquijor Mystics team due to allegations of game-fixing.

== Format ==
The inaugural conference featured a two-leg setup in which the Visayas and Mindanao-based teams are divided, playing against other teams from the same leg during the elimination round and playoffs. The winning teams from both legs then meet in what was dubbed as the "Southern Finals". The 2nd conference only featured Mindanao-based teams, causing it to have one leg, the "Mindanao Challenge". The following import-laden conference in 2022 saw the return of Visayas-based teams and legs were completely abolished. In 2023, the league transitioned to smaller tournaments for the Open Championship and Fiesta Pilar Championship, each featuring four or five teams based in Mindanao.

=== Roster regulations ===
Each team's roster must have three players from the locality it is based in. In addition, there are requirements for players based in Luzon and VisMin area.

== All-time teams ==
Team	Locality	First conference	Last conference
ALZA - Alayon Zamboanga	Zamboanga del Sur	2021 (1st)	
ARQ Builders – Lapu-Lapu City Heroes	Lapu-Lapu, Cebu	2021 (1st)	
Basilan Jumbo Plastic	Lamitan, Basilan	2021 (1st)	2021 (2nd)
CDO Stampede	Cagayan de Oro, Misamis Oriental	2023 Open	
Clarin Sto. Niño	Clarin, Misamis Occidental	2021 (1st)	
CPG–Bohol Pure Mineral Water Dolphins	President Carlos P. Garcia, Bohol	2022 Import-laden	
Dumaguete Warriors	Dumaguete, Negros Oriental	2021 (1st)	
Iligan Alpha Omega Kings (Note: Iligan was previously represented by the Iligan City Archangels during the 2021 – 1st Conference and 2021 – 2nd Conference.)	Iligan, Lanao del Norte	2021 (1st)	2023 Fiesta Pilar
Kapatagan Buffalos	Kapatagan, Lanao del Norte	2021 (1st)	2021 (2nd)
Kalos PH Lawaan	Lawaan, Eastern Samar	2022 Import-laden	
KCS Computer Specialists – Mandaue	Mandaue, Cebu	2021 (1st)	
MACFI Basilan Golden Lions	Isabela, Basilan	2022 Import-laden	
McDavid ZamPen	Zamboanga Peninsula	2022 Import-laden	2023 Fiesta Pilar
MisOr Mustangs (Note: Misamis Oriental was previously represented by the MisOr Brew Authoritea during the 2021 1st Conference, MisOr Kuyamis during the 2021 2nd Conference, and MisOr Nobles' Seafood and Grill during the 2023 Open Championship.)	Misamis Oriental	2021 (1st)	2023 Fiesta Pilar
MJAS Zenith – Talisay City Aquastars	Talisay, Cebu	2021 (1st)	
OCCCI Ormoc Sheer Masters	Ormoc, Leyte	2022 Import-laden	
Pagadian Explorers	Pagadian, Zamboanga del Sur	2021 (1st)	2021 (2nd)
Roxas Vanguards	Roxas, Zamboanga del Norte	2021 (1st)	2021 (2nd)
Siquijor Mystics	Siquijor, Siquijor	2021 (1st) (Note: The Siquijor Mystics were expelled mid-conference due to the 2021 Pilipinas VisMin Super Cup game-fixing scandal.)	
Sultan Naga Dimaporo Barracudas	Sultan Naga Dimaporo, Lanao del Norte	2022 Import-laden	
Tabogon Voyagers	Tabogon, Cebu	2021 (1st)	
Tubigon–Bohol Mariners	Tubigon, Bohol	2021 (1st)	2022 Import-laden
Zamboanga Sibugay Knights (Note: Zamboanga Sibugay was previously represented by the Zamboanga Sibugay Warriors during the 2021 – 2nd Conference.)	Zamboanga Sibugay	2021 (2nd)	2023 Fiesta Pilar
Zamboanga Valientes	Zamboanga City, Zamboanga del Sur	2021 (1st)	2023 Fiesta Pilar

== List of champions ==
Year	Tournament	Winning team	Score	Losing team
2021	1st	Basilan Jumbo Plastic	3–0 (series)	KCS Computer Specialist
2021	2nd	Zamboanga Sibugay Warriors	2–0 (series)	Kapatagan Buffalo Braves
2022	Import-laden	CPG-Bohol Dolphins	2–0 (series)	OCCCI Ormoc Sheer Masters
2023	Open	Zamboanga Valientes	108–93	McDavid ZamPen
2023	Fiesta Pilar	MisOr Mustangs	85–80	Zamboanga Valientes

=== Youth tournaments ===
Year	Tournament	Winning team	Score	Losing team
2022	25-under	Zamboanga Valientes	87–86	Zamboanga Sibugay Warriors
