= 2021 Pilipinas VisMin Super Cup game-fixing scandal =

Lapu Lapu City Heroes vs. Siquijor Mystics Pilipinas VisMin Super Cup 1st Conference
Lapu Lapu City Heroes	Siquijor Mystics
27	13
- Match abandoned at half-time
	1	2	3	4	Total
Lapu Lapu City Heroes	24	3	0	0	27
Siquijor Mystics	5	8	0	0	13
- Date: April 14, 2021
- Venue: Alcantara Civic Center, Alcantara, Cebu

The 2021 Pilipinas VisMin Super Cup game-fixing scandal revolves around the game between the Lapu-Lapu City Heroes and the Siquijor Mystics during the 2021 1st Conference of the newly established Pilipinas VisMin Super Cup held on April 14, 2021. The game was called off at half-time with the score line of 27–13, with Lapu-Lapu City leading. The game was subject to controversy due to "lack of respect for the game" displayed with both teams missing an unusual amount of free throws and was marred by suspicion that there was game fixing involved.

== Background ==
The VisMin Super Cup is a regional basketball league featuring teams from Visayas and Mindanao. The league's inaugural conference opened on April 9, 2021, with the Visayas leg, which took place in a bubble in Alcantara, Cebu due to the prevailing COVID-19 pandemic in the Philippines at that time.

Heading into the game, Siquijor lost its first game to Mandaue (46–66) but won its second game against the Dumaguete Warriors (105–100). Meanwhile, Lapu Lapu City registered a 75–61 win in their first game against Tabongon Voyagers.

== Match details ==
The game was marred by several failed free throw and layup attempts by players of both the ARQ Builders-Lapu-Lapu City Heroes and the Siquijor Mystics. In the first quarter, the Siquijor Mystics only scored five points with the Lapu Lapu City Heroes responding with 24 points. In the second quarter, both teams scored low with the Mystics only converting eight of their shots and the Heroes only scoring four points. The game was halted at half-time and a press release by the league initially cited a power outage at the venue as the reason for the stoppage which makes the livestreaming of the game unfeasible despite the availability of a power generation on site. The score line stood 27–13 in favor of the Heroes.

The Mystics failed to convert all of their 10 free throw attempts while they have allowed the Heroes to make 20 attempts. Both teams missed an unusual amount of free throws. The Mystics were also noted to have been able to score only one point despite having many fastbreak attempts. Heroes player Rendell Senining's attempt was also noted for missing both of his free throw attempt; with the first one made using his left hand and the second one attempted using his right hand. Play was also briefly stopped after a power interruption mid-way into the second quarter prior to the game's stoppage at half time.

April 14, 2021

ARQ Builders-Lapu-Lapu City Heroes	27–13	Siquijor Mystics
Scoring by quarter: 24–5, 4–8, game abandoned

Alcantara Civic Center, Alcantara, Cebu

== Aftermath ==
=== Initial reactions ===
The outcome of the game had widespread negative reception among the Philippine basketball community with noted players from the Philippine Basketball Association calling out the "lack of respect" for the sport during the game. Title sponsors of VisMin, Bounty Agro Ventures said they could withdraw their support if not sanctions for erring parties would not be made. The company also alleged there was game fixing involved.

Heroes team owner Jason Arquisola maintained that his team intends to win the league title and alleged the opposing team did not, while admitted that his own players could have managed themselves better. Heroes player Rendell Senining who was noted for his failed free throw attempts using both his left and right hands in two separate attempts, maintained there was no game fixing on his team's part and the Heroes' conduct was due to frustration over the Mystics' play. Speaking for the team, he said the whole team felt that the Mystics were "disrespecting the game". Entering the second quarter, he narrated that the Heroes' head coach asked the opposing team to play properly. In a bid to have the game stopped, Senining said that the Heroes' players decide among themselves to have the "served back" the type of play the Mystics are using against them. Senining has also apologized for his role in the incident.

VisMin league management also learned the Siquijor Mystics had no formal connections with the local government of Siquijor province, which led to the management issuing a letter of apology to Zaldy Villa, the province's governor and Jake Villa, the province's congressman for admitting the team to the league.

=== Sanctions ===
The night after the game, the VisMin management decided to expel the Siquijor Mystics from the league and ban its players and coaches from joining other participating teams in the league. Coaches and players of the Lapu Lapu City Heroes were also suspended for the remaining of the first round of the Visayas leg and was also fined. The league management also released a statement clarifying that the Heroes' coaches were fined for unprofessional behavior rather than being involved in game fixing. In addition, any records of games involving the Siquijor Mystics during the conference were nullified.

The Games and Amusements Board (GAB) also launched its own investigation on the incident, which could revoke the license of erring players and coaches. The investigation concluded in October 2021 with GAB revoking the licenses of 10 Mystics players and suspending both officials and players from both teams.

The following are the sanctions imposed for each team by the league:

Sanctions on players

ARQ Builders Lapu Lapu City Heroes
Player	Sanction
Rendell Senining	Season suspension and ₱30,000 fine
Jercules Tangkay	First round suspension and ₱15,000 fine
Reed Juntilla	First round suspension and ₱15,000 fine
Monbert Arong	First round suspension and ₱15,000 fine
Dawn Ochea	First round suspension and ₱15,000 fine
Ferdinand Lusdoc	First round suspension and ₱15,000 fine

Siquijor Mystics
Player	Sanction
Jan Cedric Penaflor	Team expelled from league; players also ineligible to participate in all Basketball Federation of the Philippines (SBG) competitions for match fixing.
Michael John Calomot	Team expelled from league; players also ineligible to participate in all Basketball Federation of the Philippines (SBG) competitions for match fixing.
Frederick Rodriguez	Team expelled from league; players also ineligible to participate in all Basketball Federation of the Philippines (SBG) competitions for match fixing.
Gene Belleza	Team expelled from league; players also ineligible to participate in all Basketball Federation of the Philippines (SBG) competitions for match fixing.
Jopet Quiro	Team expelled from league; players also ineligible to participate in all Basketball Federation of the Philippines (SBG) competitions for match fixing.
Isagani Gooc	Team expelled from league; players also ineligible to participate in all Basketball Federation of the Philippines (SBG) competitions for match fixing.
Juan Andre Aspiras	Team expelled from league; players also ineligible to participate in all Basketball Federation of the Philippines (SBG) competitions for match fixing.
Desmore Joshua Alcober	Team expelled from league; players also ineligible to participate in all Basketball Federation of the Philippines (SBG) competitions for match fixing.
Vincent Tangcay	Team expelled from league; players also ineligible to participate in all Basketball Federation of the Philippines (SBG) competitions for match fixing.
John Peter Buenafe	Team expelled from league; players also ineligible to participate in all Basketball Federation of the Philippines (SBG) competitions for match fixing.
Ryan Clarence Buenafe	Team expelled from league; players also ineligible to participate in all Basketball Federation of the Philippines (SBG) competitions for match fixing.

- Miguel Castellano (who was nursing an injury) and Michael Sereno (who did not enter the Alcantara bubble) have been cleared by the league.

Sanctions on officials

Lapu-Lapu City Heroes
Official	Position	Sanction
Francis Auquico	Head coach	First round suspension and ₱30,000 fine
Jerry Abuyador	Assistant coach	₱20,000 fine
Alex Cainglet	Coaching staff member	₱20,000 fine
Jon Carlo Nuyles	Coaching staff member	₱20,000 fine
Hamilton Tundag	Coaching staff member	₱20,000 fine
Roger Justin Potot	Coaching staff member	₱20,000 fine

Siquijor Mystics
Official	Position	Sanction
Joel Palapal	Head coach	Team expelled from league; staff also ineligible to participate in all Basketball Federation of the Philippines (SBG) competitions for match fixing.
Magenelio Padrigao	Assistant coach	Team expelled from league; staff also ineligible to participate in all Basketball Federation of the Philippines (SBG) competitions for match fixing.

=== Performance by Lapu-Lapu ===
Despite their roster from being reduced to ten players, missing five key players and their head coach due to suspensions, the Lapu-Lapu City Heroes went on to compete against the MJAS Zenith-Talisay City Aquastars, a team which has not incurred any league lost at the time, on April 17 and was leading 67–-64 with only six minutes left in that game. The Heroes eventually lost 75–84 to the Aquastars but the Heroes insist they intend to win the 2021 season league title.
