= 2021 Pilipinas VisMin Super Cup =

The 2021 Pilipinas VisMin Super Cup may refer either of these two seasons held within 2021.

- Pilipinas VisMin Super Cup 1st Conference – held from May to August 2021
- Pilipinas VisMin Super Cup 2nd Conference – held in December 2021
