= Manok ng Bayan–SBP 3X3 =

Manok ng Bayan-SBP 3X3
- 2019

Tournament information
- Sport: 3x3 basketball
- Location: Minglanilla and Talisay, Cebu, Philippines
- Venue(s): SMS-Boystown open courts, Minglanilla (Boys); SMS-Girlstown open courts, Talisay (Girls)
- Participants: 1,114 boys 1,656 girls (3,036 overall)

Final positions
- Champions: Leg 4 Team B8 (Boys); Leg 6 Team G1 (Girls)
- Runner-up: Leg 3 Team B27 (Boys); Leg 4 Team G1 (Girls)

Manok ng Bayan–SBP 3X3 was a 3x3 basketball youth tournament organized for boys and girls in Cebu, Philippines held from January 12 to 13, 2019. It was organized by the Samahang Basketbol ng Pilipinas, the Cebu Provincial Sports Commission, and Bounty Agro Ventures, the company responsible for the Chooks-to-Go roast chicken brand and was sanctioned by FIBA.

The boys' tournament held the record of the biggest FIBA sanctioned youth tournament at 1,114 participants, with the girls' tournament shortly breaking it with 1,656 participants. The event overall had 3,036 participants making it the largest FIBA-sanctioned tournament ever. This record is to be confirmed by FIBA.

== Background ==
The organizing of the Manok ng Bayan–SBP 3X3 was an attempt to break world records in participation in FIBA-sanctioned 3x3 basketball tournaments. The previous record for the most participated FIBA-sanctioned youth tournament is at 1,114 participants while the most participated tournament record overall was set at 1,898 players. The youth tournament was also organized in order for the Philippines to accumulate federation ranking points to be able to qualify for the 3x3 basketball event at the 2020 Summer Olympics in Tokyo. As of January 11, 2019, the Philippines is ranked 55th in the Federation Rankings with 545,311 points. Collegiate players Kobe Paras and Thirdy Ravena also joined the event as guests.

The fundamentals of 3x3 basketball, which has several differences to the standard five-a-side basketball, was also taught to students since the event also served as an outreach program. The event was an initiative of the Cebu Provincial Sports Commission and commercial basketball coach Van Halen Parmis. Chooks-to-Go and the Samahang Basketbol ng Pilipinas selected the Sisters of Mary Schools as the venue of the event.

The event also served as the official kickoff to the upcoming Chooks-to-Go Pilipinas 3x3 league.

Participants had to get themselves registered with the FIBA 3x3 play database. One hundred coaches were also tapped in order to prepare the participants of the event.

== Tournament ==
=== Boys' ===
The boys' tournament took place at the Minglanilla campus of the Sisters of Mary School Boystown on January 12, 2019. Matches were held across 50 halfcourts. 1,380 boys of age 18 and under registered for the event breaking the FIBA record for the biggest under-18 event. The previous record holder was participated by 1,114 players.

The boys' event was won by Team B8 from leg 4, consisting of Joeffrey Ramiso, Argie Basaya, Dennis Gantaloa, and Alunar Escraman who outbested Team B27 of leg 3 in the final consisting of Jayar Tigle, Junel Mainit, Alexander Respito, and Bretneil Zamoria. The winner of leg 1 was Team B32 of John Louie Lechedo, Archie Samonte, John Rey Ichon, and Adrian Cacaldo while the winner of leg 2 was Team B46 of John Vincent Valenzona, Jimboy Roxas, Ralph Kendrick Delposo, and Mark Anthony Gidayawan.

=== Girls' ===
The girls' tournament took place at the Talisay campus of the Sisters of Mary School Girlstown on January 13, 2019. It was larger than the boys' tournament held the day before with 1,656 girls age 18 and under registered for the event and pushed the combined number of participants for the boy's and girls' tournaments of Manok ng Bayan–SBP 3X3 to 3,036 participants.

There were six legs for the girls' tournament with 441 teams competing. 36 courts were used for matches. Team G1 of Leg 6 were the champions of the girls' tournament consisting of twins Gleafel and Gleagen Janier, Aianna Apostol, and Desiree Salvado. Team G1 won over Team G1 of Leg 4 which consists of Jane Madria, Jenifer Mahusay, Jenny Amor, and Ivy Garnica.

== Aftermath ==
Chooks-to-Go donated ₱100,000 to the Sisters of Mary School following the conclusion of the event and also made a pledge on the spot to donate the same amount monthly for the continued operations of the educational and charity institution.

The total number of registered participants for the Manok ng Bayan-SBP 3x3 event were 3,036 participants breaking the record for the biggest FIBA-sanctioned FIBA-event by participants. The previous holder had 1,898 participants. However this is still to be verified by FIBA with the organizers to send documentations to the world basketball body so the record be confirmed and the Federation Ranking points earned be granted. Also plans to make the event an annual event was announced.

The Philippine men's national 3x3 team was able to secure a berth in the Olympic Qualifying Tournament (OQT) for the 2020 Summer Olympics.

== See also ==
- Philippines men's national 3x3 team
- Philippines women's national 3x3 team
