= BVP =

BVP can refer to:

- Basilan Viva Portmasters, a Filipino basketball team
- Bavarian People's Party
- Bessemer Venture Partners, an American venture capital firm
- Boundary value problem
- Bo Van Pelt, an American professional golfer
- Blood volume pulse
