= Bounty Fresh Chicken =

Philippine poultry brand

- Product type: Poultry
- Current owner: Bounty Fresh Food, Inc.
- Country: Philippines
- Introduced: 1986; 40 years ago
- Markets: Philippines
- Website: http://bounty.ph/

Bounty Fresh Chicken is a brand under the Bounty Fresh Group of Companies (BFGC) (registered legal entity: Bounty Fresh Group Holdings Inc. (BFGHI)), a privately-owned company operating in the Philippines. Bounty Fresh Chicken supplies live chicken, dressed chicken, and various processed chicken products, one of the most notable is their line of roasted chicken under Chooks-to-Go, and is present in all major locations in the Philippines.

BFGC has its own dressing plant operating in Pulilan, Bulacan province.

Another dressing plant has been recently opened in Hermosa, Bataan province.

In other localities, it is sourced and distributed by Bounty Agro Ventures, Inc. (BAVI), which is also under BFGC.

BFGC was the first company in the Philippines to employ the single-stage hatchery incubation system, in which eggs are grouped according to their development stage to be incubated together.

== History ==
Bounty Fresh Chicken began with egg production in 1986 under the Chen family. Broiler integration commenced in 1995, while full operation started in 2008, from raising layers, growing broilers and processing raw chicken to developing various chicken products.

In 2009, Bounty Fresh Chicken won the 2009 Best Poultry and Livestock Company award at the 2009 Asian Livestock Industry Awards in Kuala Lumpur, Malaysia. The categories were Technological Excellence, Food Safety, Marketing Excellence and Industry Leadership. In 2010, singer Lea Salonga was chosen to be the brand's endorser.

In October 2010, the president of BFFI and concurrent Chairman of the Board of BAVI, Tennyson G. Chen, was named Entrepreneur of the Year 2010 and Master Entrepreneur in SGV & Co. Foundation's Ernst & Young Entrepreneur of the Year Awards.

Chen's goal is to help raise the average Filipino's consumption of chicken to 15 kilograms annually from about 8 kilograms, which is the current rate, by 2020.

In 2012, Bounty Fresh was tagged as the premier poultry integrator in the Philippines, as well as being responsible for leading the poultry industry's expansion in the country.

== Products ==
Bounty Fresh Chicken sells poultry-based products. These include dressed chicken in vacuum packs, tray-sealed "Meals in Minutes", and "Cut-Ups" in vacuum and ULMA packaging.

Bounty Fresh also sells processed meats such as Chicken Puffs, Disney-branded nuggets, and heat-and-eat products. Some products have halal certification.
