= Starhorse Shipping Lines =

Philippine shipping company

- Type: Private
- Industry: Shipping
- Founded: 2008; 18 years ago in Lucena, Quezon Province
- Founder: Victor Reyes
- Headquarters: Lucena, Quezon, Philippines
- Area served: Marinduque, Masbate, Mindoro, Quezon and Romblon
- Key people: Merian Reyes; Dominic Reyes
- Website: starhorse.com.ph

Starhorse Shipping Lines, Inc. is a domestic shipping company based in Lucena, Quezon, Philippines. It was established in 2008 by entrepreneur and politician Victor Reyes, who was a former board member in Quezon Province. It mainly serves the provinces of Marinduque, Masbate, Quezon, and Romblon and is one of the leading domestic shipping companies operating in the Calabarzon, Bicol, Visayas, and Mimaropa regions.

== History ==
Starhorse Shipping Lines, Inc. (SSLI) was established in 2008 by entrepreneur and Quezon Province provincial board member Victor A. Reyes, who was previously the President of the defunct domestic shipping company Viva Shipping Lines, Inc. in the 1990s. SSLI is now being managed by Victor Reyes' wife, Merian Hernandez-Reyes, following Reyes' death in 2016.

The company acquired two RORO ferries leased from the state-owned DBP Leasing Corporation and operated them initially in the Lucena City-Marinduque route. In the succeeding years, the Maritime Industry Authority eventually allowed the company to operate in other routes aside from the Lucena-Marinduque and Lucena-Marinduque-Romblon route. In 2018, the company commissioned the construction of two new vessels in Mokpo, South Korea, allowing it to operate additional routes such as the San Andres, Quezon-Pasacao, Camarines Sur-San Pascual, Masbate route.

In 2020, during the COVID-19 pandemic in the Philippines, the company was one of several ferry companies that assisted the Philippine government in helping locally stranded individuals return to their provinces.

== Involvement in sports ==
In 2025, Starhorse Shipping Lines began its entry into sports. It first backed the return of Basilan's Maharlika Pilipinas Basketball League franchise, becoming the Basilan Viva Portmasters for the 2025 MPBL season. It also planned to acquire the Terrafirma Dyip Philippine Basketball Association franchise beginning with the 2025–26 PBA season. However the sale was aborted. They would have competed as the "Sea Titans".

== Routes ==
As of April 2023, Starhorse Shipping Lines operates on the following routes:

From	To
Lucena, Quezon Province
Lucena, Quezon Province	Mogpog, Marinduque
Lucena, Quezon Province	Gasan, Marinduque
Lucena, Quezon Province	Banton, Romblon
Lucena, Quezon Province	Corcuera, Romblon
Lucena, Quezon Province	San Agustin, Romblon
Lucena, Quezon Province	Romblon, Romblon
Lucena, Quezon Province	Magdiwang, Romblon
Lucena, Quezon Province	Masbate City, Masbate
San Pascual, Masbate
San Pascual, Masbate	Pasacao, Camarines Sur
San Pascual, Masbate	San Andres, Quezon
Batangas City, Batangas
Batangas City, Batangas	Calapan, Oriental Mindoro
Batangas City, Batangas	Abra de Ilog, Occidental Mindoro
Real, Quezon
Real, Quezon	Polillo, Quezon
San Andres, Quezon	San Pascual, Masbate

== Vessels ==
Starhorse Shipping Lines operates sixteen RORO vessels (Including the vessels from their sister company, Viva Peñafrancia Lines) as of April 2026. Some of these vessels were leased from DBP Leasing Corporation, while four were built by Moon-chang Shipbuilding Dockyard in Mokpo, South Korea:

=== Virgen de Peñafrancia series ===
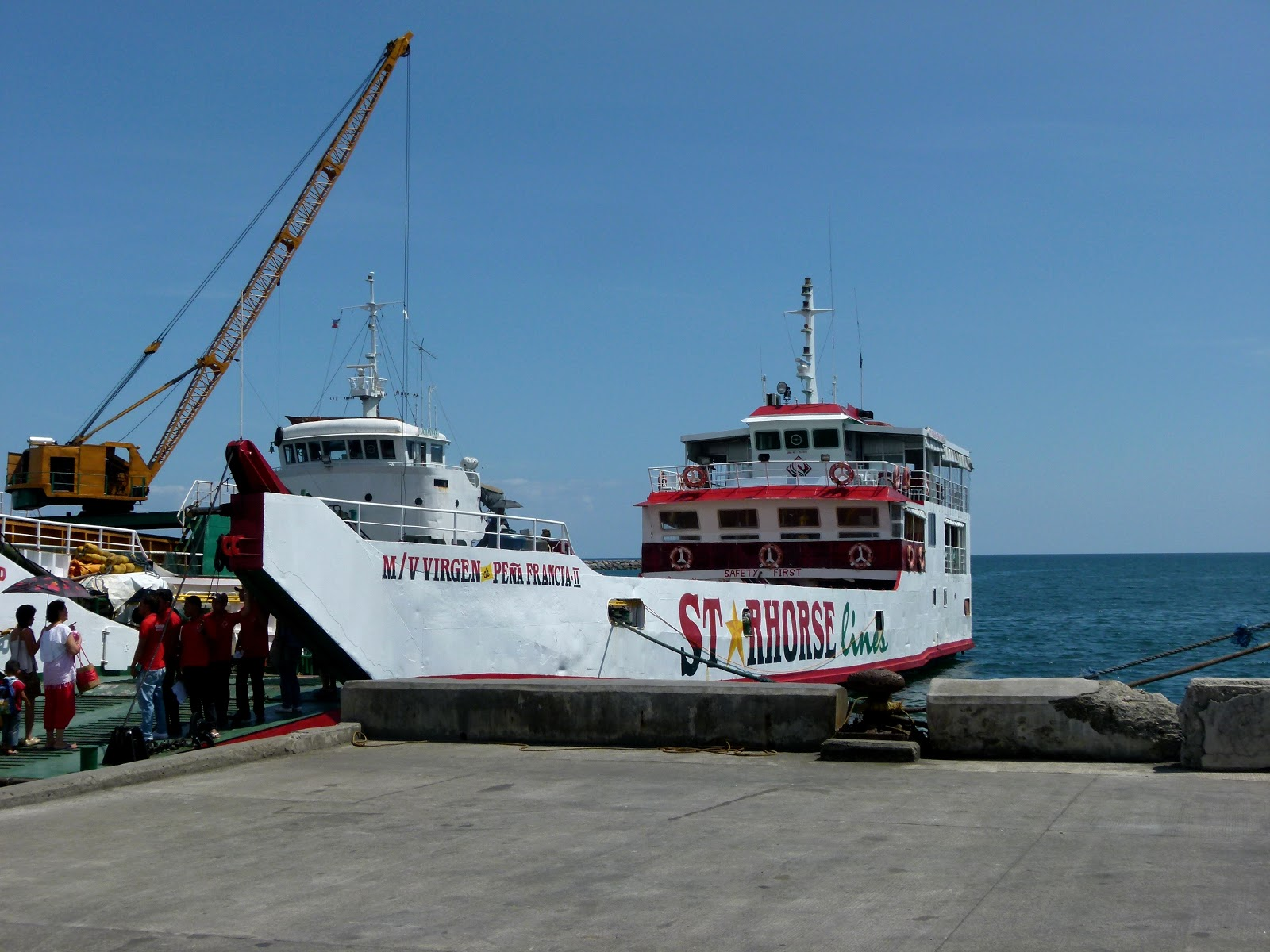
Starhorse MV Virgen de Peñafrancia II (before her refitting)

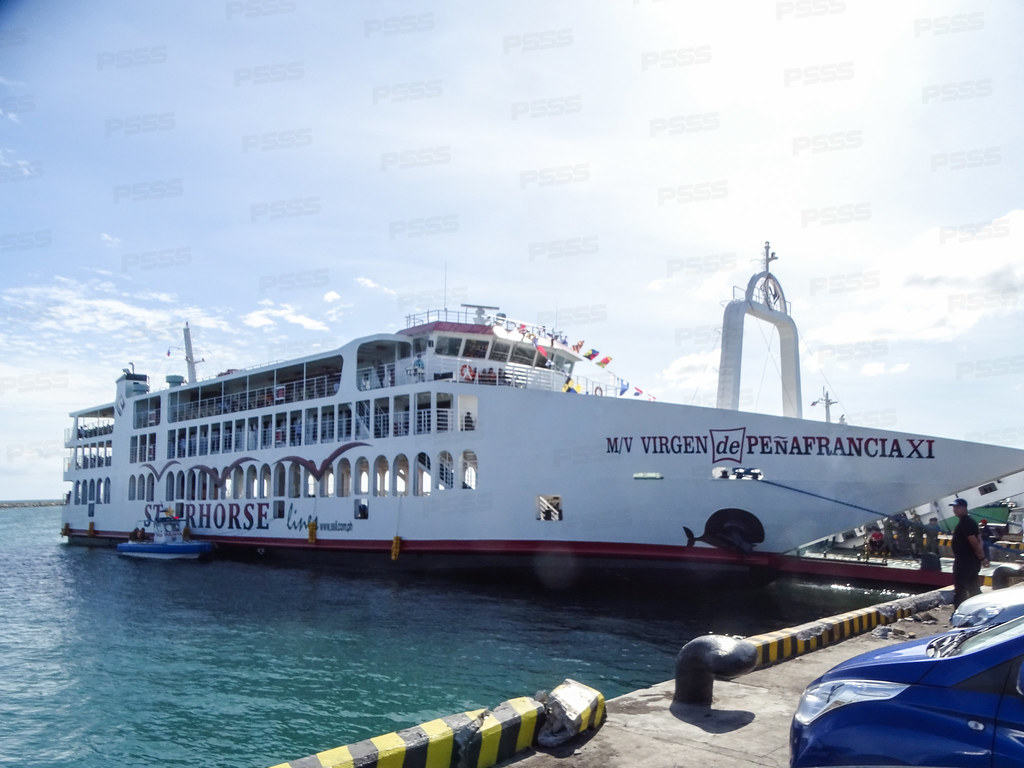
Starhorse MV Virgen De Peñafrancia XI

- MV Virgen de Peñafrancia I
- MV Virgen de Peñafrancia II
- MV Virgen de Peñafrancia Tres Reyes
- MV Virgen de Peñafrancia V
- MV Virgen de Peñafrancia VI
- MV Virgen de Peñafrancia VII
- MV Virgen de Peñafrancia VIII
- MV Virgen de Peñafrancia IX
- MV Virgen de Peñafrancia X
- MV Virgen de Peñafrancia XI
- MV Virgen de Peñafrancia XII
- MV Virgen de Peñafrancia XV
- MV Virgen de Peñafrancia XVI (New Vessel)

=== Viva series ===
- MV Viva Sto. Domingo
- MV Viva Marian Queen
- MV Viva San Lorenzo Ruiz

=== Future vessels ===
- MV Virgen de Peñafrancia XVII

=== Former vessels ===
These are the former vessels of Starhorse Shipping Lines:

- MV Virgen de Peñafrancia VII/Reina De Luna
- MV Virgen de Peñafrancia VIII/Pinoy Roro 1
