= 2021 Pilipinas VisMin Super Cup 2nd Conference =

2021 VisMin 2nd Conference
- League: Pilipinas VisMin Super Cup
- Sport: Basketball
- Duration: November 20 – December 18, 2021

Elimination round
- Champions: Zamboanga Sibugay Warriors
- Runners-up: Kapatagan Buffalo Braves
- Finals MVP: Jaybie Mantilla (Zamboanga Sibugay)

VisMin seasons
- ← 2021 (1st) 2022 (Import-laden) →

The Pilipinas VisMin Super Cup 2nd Conference, was the second season of the Pilipinas VisMin Super Cup.

The tournament featured seven teams that are all based in Mindanao, lacking the presence of any Visayas-based teams. Hence, the tournament is also referred to as the Mindanao Challenge.

The Zamboanga Sibugay Warriors were the champions of the conference, after defeating the Kapatagan Buffalo Braves in the Finals.

== Teams ==
Team	Locality	Main sponsor	Head coach
Basilan Peace Riders	Lamitan, Basilan		Jinno Manansala
Iligan City Archangels	Iligan, Lanao del Norte		Amante "Kiko" Flores
Kapatagan Buffalo Braves	Kapatagan, Lanao del Norte		Jaime Rivera
Globalport Z Valientes MisOr	Misamis Oriental	GlobalPort; Zamboanga Valientes	Vis Valencia
Pagadian Explorers	Pagadian, Zamboanga del Sur		Gherome Ejercito
Roxas Vanguards	Roxas, Zamboanga del Norte		Eddie Laure
Zamboanga Sibugay Warriors	Zamboanga Sibugay	Anak Mindanao	Arnold Oliveros

== Roster regulations ==
Each team should have no more than six players from Luzon in their roster. In each quarter, teams could field a maximum of two players from Luzon, two from VisMin and one homegrown player per quarter.

== Elimination round ==
Pos	Team	W	L	PCT	GB	Qualification
1	Globalport Z Valientes MisOr	8	4	.667	—	Semifinals
2	Pagadian Explorers	7	5	.583	1	Twice-to-beat in Quarterfinals
3	Kapatagan Buffalo Braves	7	5	.583	1	Twice-to-beat in Quarterfinals
4	Zamboanga Sibugay Warriors	6	6	.500	2	Twice-to-beat in Quarterfinals
5	Roxas Vanguards	6	6	.500	2	Twice-to-win in Quarterfinals
6	Basilan Peace Riders	5	7	.417	3	Twice-to-win in Quarterfinals
7	Iligan City Archangels	3	9	.250	5	Twice-to-win in Quarterfinals

Source: VisMin Super Cup

== Playoffs ==
=== Bracket ===
Quarterfinals
4	Zamboanga Sibugay	84
5	Roxas	73
2	Pagadian	105
7	Iligan	78
3	Kapatagan	64
6	Basilan	60

Semifinals
1	MisOr
4	Zamboanga Sibugay
2	Pagadian	56
3	Kapatagan	66

Finals
4	Zamboanga Sibugay	89	–
3	Kapatagan	80	–
