= 2022 PSL season =

The 2022 PSL season may refer to:

- 2022 Pakistan Super League
- 2022 Pilipinas Super League season
