= Roxas Vanguards =

Basketball team in the Philippines

- League: VisMin (2021); PSL (2022)
- Founded: 2021
- Dissolved: 2022
- History: Roxas Vanguards (2021–2022)
- Arena: Manuel A. Roxas Sports Complex
- Location: Roxas, Zamboanga del Norte
- Team colors
- Main sponsor: Petra Cement
- Head coach: Alvin Grey

The Roxas Vanguards were a Filipino professional basketball team based in Roxas, Zamboanga del Norte. The team last competed in the Pilipinas Super League.

The team was founded in 2021 as a member of charter member of the Pilipinas VisMin Super Cup.

== History ==
The Roxas Vanguards was formed by the municipal government of Roxas, Zamboanga del Norte under Mayor Jan Hendrik Vallecer upon the suggestion of Zamboanga del Norte governor Roberto Uy to send a team for the Pilipinas VisMin Super Cup.

=== Pilipinas VisMin Super Cup ===
In the First Conference, Roxas finished the elimination round of the Mindanao leg in fourth place with a 5–3 record. In the playoffs, they won by default against MisOr Brew Authoritea in Quarterfinals Round 1 then swept third-seeded Pagadian in Quarterfinals Round 2. In the Semifinals, they faced against JPS Zamboanga City where they won in three games to advance to the Mindanao Finals against the undefeated Basilan Peace Riders. Unfortunately for Roxas, they would be swept by Basilan.

Roxas then returned for the Second Conference, finishing fifth with a 6–6 record. They would lose against the Zamboanga Sibugay Warriors in the Quarterfinals, which had a twice-to-beat advantage.

=== Pilipinas Super League ===
The Vanguards then moved to the Pilipinas Super League in 2022, becoming one of its charter teams. Finishing with an 11–3 record, Roxas advanced to the playoffs as the second seed. They would lose to the Cagayan de Oro Higalas in the Semifinals, putting the Vanguards in the Battle for Third. It turned out to be a rematch of the Mindanao Finals of the 2021 VisMin First Conference, as they went against the Basilan Peace Riders in a single-game series. Roxas beat Basilan 66–59 to take the third place spot.

== Season-by-season records ==
Records as of the 2022 PSL Pearl of the Orient Cup:

=== Pilipinas VisMin Super Cup ===
Season	Elimination round					Playoffs	
Season	Leg	Finish	W	L	PCT	Stage	Results
Roxas Vanguards
2021 – First	Mindanao	5th	5	3	.625	Quarterfinals 1 Quarterfinals 2 Semifinals; Mindanao Finals	won by default vs. MisOr won vs. Pagadian, 2–0 won vs. Zamboanga City, 2–1 lost vs. Basilan, 0–2
2021 – Second; Mindanao Challenge	None	5th	6	6	.500	Quarterfinals	lost vs. Zamboanga Sibugay, 60–68
All-time elimination round record			11	9	.550	2 playoff appearances	
All-time playoff record			5	4	.556	0 Finals appearances	
All-time overall record			16	13	.552	0 championships	

=== Pilipinas Super League ===
Season	Elimination round				Playoffs	
Season	Finish	W	L	PCT	Stage	Results
Roxas Vanguards
2022; Pearl of the Orient Cup	2nd	11	3	.786	Semifinals; Battle for Third	lost vs. Cagayan de Oro, 0–2 won vs. Basilan, 66–59 (single-game)
All-time elimination round record		11	3	.786	1 playoff appearance	
All-time playoff record		1	2	.333	0 Finals appearances	
All-time overall record		12	5	.706	0 championships	
