= KCS Computer Specialist =

Philippines professional basketball team

KCS Computer Specialist–Mandaue City
- Division: Visayas
- League: Pilipinas VisMin Super Cup
- Founded: 2013
- Folded: 2021
- History: KCS Computer Specialist-Mandaue City (2013-2021)
- Location: Mandaue
- Team colors
- Main sponsor: Kiboy's Computer Solution
- Head coach: Mike Reyes
- Championships: 1 (2021 (1st Conf.))
- Division titles: 1 (2021 (1st Conf.))

KCS Computer Specialist–Mandaue City, also known as KCS–Mandaue, was a professional basketball team based in Mandaue, which last played in the Visayas division of the Pilipinas VisMin Super Cup.

== History ==
The KCS Computer Specialist team was formed in 2013 by Ricky Verdida. The team was named after Verdida's Kiboy's Computer Solution (KJC), an electronics retail chain which sales computer units and components. It competed in barangay-level competitions prior to joining the Pilipinas VisMin Super Cup in 2021.

In the inaugural 2021 VisMin Cup season, the KCS Computer Specialist as a team based in Mandaue, Cebu was grouped in the league's Visayas division. They clinched the Visayas division title by outbesting the MJAS Zenith-Talisay City Aquastars in the best-of-three final series. This feat also qualifies them to the Southern Finals. KCS settled for an overall second-place finish after conceding three games to the Basilan Jumbo Plastic in the best-of-five grand finals.

In August 2021, team owner Verdida announced that he would be selling the franchise of KCS Computer Specialist due to financial constraints.

The team held an exhibition game in August 2023 and played against the Northball Basketball team.
