= 2021 Pilipinas VisMin Super Cup 1st Conference =

2021 VisMin 1st Conference
- League: Pilipinas VisMin Super Cup
- Sport: Basketball
- Duration: Visayas leg: April 9 – May 9, 2021; Mindanao leg: July 7 – August 9, 2021; Finals: August 11 – 13, 2021

Elimination rounds
- Visayas champions: KCS Computer Specialist – Mandaue
- Visayas runners-up: Talisay Aquastars
- Mindanao champions: Basilan Peace Riders
- Mindanao runners-up: Roxas Vanguards

Finals
- Champions: Basilan Peace Riders
- Runners-up: KCS Computer Specialist – Mandaue

Seasons
- 2021 (2nd) →

The 2021 Pilipinas VisMin Super Cup 1st Conference, was the inaugural conference of the Pilipinas VisMin Super Cup. The elimination rounds began on April 9, 2021 with the start of the Visayas leg and ended on August 9, 2021 with the conclusion of the Mindanao leg. The Finals then ran from August 11 to 13, 2023.

== Teams ==
| Team | Locality | Main sponsor | Head coach |
Visayas
| Lapu-Lapu City Heroes | Lapu-Lapu, Cebu | ARQ Builders | Francis Auquico |
| Dumaguete Warriors | Dumaguete, Negros Oriental | | Rommel Uka |
| KCS Computer Specialist – Mandaue | Manduae, Cebu | Kiboy's Computer Solutions | Mike Reyes |
| Talisay City Aquastars | Talisay, Cebu | MJAS Zenith | Aldrin Morante |
| Siquijor Mystics (Note: The Siquijor Mystics were expelled due to the 2021 Pilipinas VisMin Super Cup game-fixing scandal.) | Siquijor | | Jose Manuel Palapal |
| Tabogon Voyagers | Tabogon, Cebu | | Expedito Delos Santos Jr. |
| Tubigon–Bohol Mariners | Tubigon, Bohol | | Gino Angelo Enriquez |
Mindanao
| ALZA – Alayon Zamboanga | Zamboanga del Sur | | Rodolfo Jose Abad Jr. |
| Basilan Peace Riders | Lamitan, Basilan | Jumbo Plastic | Jerson Cabiltes |
| Clarin Sto. Niño | Clarin, Misamis Occidental | | Miguel Borilla Jr. |
| Iligan City Archangels | Iligan, Lanao del Norte | | Dane Lariosa |
| Kapatagan Buffalo Braves | Kapatagan, Lanao del Norte | | Cris Bautista |
| MisOr Brew Authoritea | Misamis Oriental | Brew AuthoriTEA | Vis Valencia |
| Pagadian Explorers | Pagadian, Zamboanga del Sur | | Harold Sta. Cruz |
| Roxas Vanguards | Roxas, Zamboanga del Norte | Petra Cement | Eddie Laure |
| JPS Zamboanga City | Zamboanga City, Zamboanga del Sur | | Tony Pardo |

== Visayas leg ==
All games were held in the Alcantara Civic Center in Alcantara, Cebu.

=== Elimination round ===
==== Standings ====
| Pos | Team | W | L | PCT | GB | Qualification |
|---|---|---|---|---|---|---|
| 1 | MJAS Zenith Talisay City Aquastars | 10 | 0 | 1.000 | — | Finals (Note: By virtue of undefeated record.) |
| 2 | KCS Computer Specialist – Mandaue | 8 | 2 | .800 | 2 | Semifinals |
| 3 | ARQ Builders Lapu-Lapu City Heroes | 5 | 5 | .500 | 5 | Quarterfinals |
| 4 | Tabogon Voyagers | 3 | 7 | .300 | 7 | Quarterfinals |
| 5 | Dumaguete Warriors | 2 | 8 | .200 (Note: Head-to-head record: Dumaguete 1–1 Tubigon–Bohol; Dumaguete +14) | 8 | Quarterfinals |
| 6 | Tubigon–Bohol Mariners | 2 | 8 | .200 | 8 | Quarterfinals |
| – | Siquijor Mystics (Note: All records of the Siquijor Mystics were nullified after the team's expulsion from the league. Prior to that, the team's record was at 1–1.) | 0 | 0 | — | 5 | Expelled |

Rules for classification: 1) winning percentage; 2) head-to-head record; 3) overall goal average (quotient) 4) coin toss

===== Results =====
| Teams | DUM | LAP | MAN | TAB | TAL | TUB |
|---|---|---|---|---|---|---|
| Dumaguete | — | 57–67 | 73–79 | 78–86 | 72–92 | 88–73 |
| Lapu-Lapu City | 76–62 | — | 66–77 | 75–61 | 75–84 | 61–55 |
| Mandaue | 78–50 | 75–66 | — | 86–53 | 57–77 | 91–71 |
| Tabogon | 85–90 | 76–73 | 71–82 | — | 65–85 | 102–99 |
| Talisay City | 77–66 | 99–62 | 81–73 | 104–75 | — | 104–66 |
| Tubigon–Bohol | 62–61 | 67–101 | 50–80 | 92–77 | 65–97 | — |

Legend: Blue = left column team win; Red = top row team win.
Matches with lighter background shading were decided after overtime.

Notes

- All records of the Siquijor Mystics are excluded in this table. This includes the team's 105–100 win over Dumaguete, 46–66 loss against Mandaue City, and the controversial game against Lapu-Lapu City that was halted in halftime with them trailing 13–27.

=== Playoffs ===
Every team qualified for the playoffs, which follows a stepladder-like format. With Talisay City having an undefeated record, they directly advanced to the Visayas Finals. The second-seeded team, Mandaue directly advanced to the Semifinals with twice-to-beat advantage. Teams ranked third through sixth then advanced to Quarterfinals, where they must go through two rounds before moving on to the Semifinals.

Both rounds of the Quarterfinals were single-game knockouts, the Semifinals was twice-to-beat, and the Visayas Finals was a best-of-three series.

Quarterfinals Round 1 (single game)
3 | Lapu-Lapu City | 73
6 | Tubigon–Bohol | 69
4 | Tabogon | 65
5 | Dumaguete | 67

Quarterfinals Round 2 (single game)
3 | Lapu-Lapu City | 92
5 | Dumaguete | 76

Semifinals (twice-to-beat)
2 | Mandaue | 52 | 74
3 | Lapu-Lapu City | 67 | 64

Visayas Finals (best-of-three)
1 | Talisay City | 66 | 63 | 75
2 | Mandaue | 67 | 56 | 89

==== Quarterfinals ====
May 1

| ARQ Builders Lapu-Lapu City Heroes | 73–69 | Tubigon Bohol Mariners |

Alcantara Civic Center, Alcantara, Cebu

May 1

| Tabogon Voyagers | 65–67 | Dumaguete Warriors |

Alcantara Civic Center, Alcantara, Cebu

May 2

| ARQ Builders Lapu-Lapu City Heroes | 92–76 | Dumaguete Warriors |

Alcantara Civic Center, Alcantara, Cebu

==== Semifinals ====
May 4

| KCS Computer Specialist Mandaue City | 52–67 | ARQ Builders Lapu-Lapu City Heroes |

Alcantara Civic Center, Alcantara, Cebu

May 5

| KCS Computer Specialist Mandaue City | 74–64 | ARQ Builders Lapu-Lapu City Heroes |
Mandaue City wins series in two games

Alcantara Civic Center, Alcantara, Cebu

==== Visayas Finals ====
May 7

| MJAS Zenith Talisay City Aquastars | 66–67 | KCS Computer Specialist Mandaue City |

Alcantara Civic Center, Alcantara, Cebu

May 8

| MJAS Zenith Talisay City Aquastars | 63–56 | KCS Computer Specialist Mandaue City |

Alcantara Civic Center, Alcantara, Cebu

May 9

| MJAS Zenith Talisay City Aquastars | 75–89 | KCS Computer Specialist Mandaue City |
Mandaue City wins series 2–1, and qualifies to the Grand Finals

Alcantara Civic Center, Alcantara, Cebu

- Finals MVP: Chris Exciminiano (Mandaue City)

== Mindanao leg ==
Games prior to July 17, are held in the Ipil Provincial Gym, Ipil, Zamboanga Sibugay. Games scheduled on July 17 onwards, are to be held in thePlaza Luz Gym in Pagadian, Zamboanga del Sur.

=== Elimination round ===
==== Team standings ====
| Pos | Team | W | L | PCT | GB | Qualification |
|---|---|---|---|---|---|---|
| 1 | Basilan Peace Riders | 8 | 0 | 1.000 | — | Finals |
| 2 | Clarin Sto. Niño | 7 | 1 | .875 | 1 | Twice-to-beat in Quarterfinals 1 |
| 3 | Pagadian Explorers | 5 | 3 | .625 (Note: Head-to-head record: Pagadian 1–0 Roxas) | 3 | Twice-to-beat in Quarterfinals 1 |
| 4 | Roxas Vanguards | 5 | 3 | .625 | 3 | Twice-to-beat in Quarterfinals 1 |
| 5 | JPS Zamboanga City | 4 | 4 | .500 | 4 | Twice-to-beat in Quarterfinals 1 |
| 6 | ALZA-Alayon Zamboanga | 3 | 5 | .375 | 5 | Twice-to-win in Quarterfinals 1 |
| 7 | MisOr Brew Authoritea | 2 | 6 | .250 (Note: Head-to-head record: MisOr Brew Authoritea 1–0 Kapatagan) | 6 | Twice-to-win in Quarterfinals 1 |
| 8 | Kapatagan Buffalo Braves | 2 | 6 | .250 | 6 | Twice-to-win in Quarterfinals 1 |
| 9 | Iligan City Archangels | 0 | 8 | .000 | 8 | Twice-to-win in Quarterfinals 1 |

Rules for classification: 1) winning percentage; 2) head-to-head record; 3) overall goal average (quotient) 4) coin toss

==== Results ====
| Teams | BAS | CLA | ILI | KAP | MSO | PAG | ROX | ZAM | ZDS |
|---|---|---|---|---|---|---|---|---|---|
| Basilan Peace Riders – Jumbo Plastic | — | 86–68 | 83–77 | 118–84 | 140–106 | 94–70 | 85–64 | 133–67 | 82–48 |
| Clarin Sto. Niño | | — | 98–65 | 76–65 | 73–63 | 83–77 | 72–66 | 95–69 | 96–91 |
| Iligan City Archangels | | | — | 56–64 | 64–69 | 0–20 | 79–84 | 0–20 | 0–20 |
| Kapatagan Buffalo Braves | | | | — | 105–111 | 95–67 | 65–93 | 53–89 | 89–80 |
| MisOr Brew Authoritea | | | | | — | 75–81 | 87–113 | 75–85 | 0–20 |
| Pagadian Explorers | | | | | | — | 82–80 | 82–68 | 73–78 |
| Roxas Vanguards | | | | | | | — | 71–69 | 79–72 |
| JPS Zamboanga City | | | | | | | | — | 82–79 |
| ALZA-Alayon Zamboanga del Sur | | | | | | | | | — |

Legend: Blue = left column team win; Red = top row team win.
Matches with lighter background shading were decided after overtime.

==== Playoffs ====
Every team qualified for the playoffs. With Basilan having an undefeated record, they directly advanced to the Mindanao Finals. Every other team had to go through a three-round, single-elimination bracket before advancing to the Mindanao Finals. Teams ranked second through fifth were given twice-to-beat advantage in Quarterfinals Round 1.

There were two rounds of the Quarterfinals. Only Quarterfinals Round 1 featured twice-to-beat, while the next three rounds were all best-of-three series.

Quarterfinals Round 1 (twice-to-beat)
2 | Clarin | 20 | –
9 | Iligan | 0 | –
5 | Zamboanga City | 69 | –
6 | Zamboanga del Sur | 66 | –
3 | Pagadian | 82 | 87
8 | Kapatagan | 96 | 76
4 | Roxas | 20 | –
7 | MisOr | 0 | –

Quarterfinals Round 2 (best-of-three)
2 | Clarin | 0
5 | Zamboanga City | 2
3 | Pagadian | 0
4 | Roxas | 2

Semifinals (best-of-three)
5 | Zamboanga City | 1
4 | Roxas | 2
Mindanao Finals (best-of-three)
1 | Basilan | 81 | 89 | –
4 | Roxas | 69 | 70 | –

== VisMin Finals ==
The champions of both legs advanced to the VisMin Finals, referred to as the Southern Finals. It was a best-of-five series.

| Finals (best-of-five) |
| M1 | Basilan | 94 | 96 | 83 | – | – |
| V2 | Mandaue | 67 | 91 | 65 | – | – |

August 11

| Basilan Peace Riders – Jumbo Plastic | 94–67 | KCS Computer Specialist Mandaue City |

Pagadian City Gymnasium, Ipil, Cebu

August 12

| KCS Computer Specialist Mandaue City | 91–96 | Basilan Peace Riders – Jumbo Plastic |

Pagadian City Gymnasium, Ipil, Cebu

August 13

| Basilan Peace Riders – Jumbo Plastic | 83–65 | KCS Computer Specialist Mandaue City |
Basilan wins series 3–0

Pagadian City Gymnasium, Ipil, Cebu

== Awards ==
- Most Valuable Player: Hesed Gabo (Jumbo Plastic-Basilan Peace Riders)
- Mythical Five:
  - Hesed Gabo (Jumbo Plastic-Basilan Peace Riders)
  - Michael Mabulac (Jumbo Plastic-Basilan Peace Riders)
  - John Wilson (Clarin Sto. Niño)
  - Jerwin Gaco (Zamboanga City JPS)
  - James Castro (Petra Cement-Roxas Vanguards)
- Top Homegrown Player: Rich Guinitaran

== Game-fixing scandal ==
The game between the ARQ Builders-Lapu Lapu City Heroes and the Siquijor Mystics was stopped at the half with Lapu Lapu leading, 27–13, ostensibly due to a power interruption. However, it was reported afterward that the game was stopped by officials after suspicious actions by the players—including missed free throws and blown layups. One video circulating online showed a player take a free throw first with his left hand, then with his right. Pilipinas VisMin Super Cup organizers expelled the Siquijor Mystics from the league. Fines and suspensions were also slapped against players and coaches of the Lapu-Lapu Heroes for their role in the controversial match.
