= PLDT Home: The Last Home Stand =

Philippine national team	NBA Selection

First exhibition match
Philippine national team	NBA Selection
- Cancelled
- Date: July 22, 2014
- Venue: Smart Araneta Coliseum, Quezon City

Second exhibition match
NBA Selection	Philippine national team
- Cancelled
- Date: July 23, 2014
- Venue: Smart Araneta Coliseum, Quezon City

The PLDT Home: The Last Home Stand was a charity basketball event in the Philippines, primarily sponsored by the Philippine Long Distance Telephone Company (PLDT) and organized by East-West Private LLC, a US-based events organizing company, that featured the Philippine men's national basketball team (Gilas Pilipinas) together with the players from the National Basketball Association. The proceeds of the event will be given to the Philippine Disaster Recovery Foundation and Caritas Manila.

Two exhibition games between the Philippine national team and the NBA players were scheduled to be held on July 22 and 23 at the Smart Araneta Coliseum, but were postponed moments before tipoff of the first game after the NBA players were warned by their league officials of possible penalties and suspensions if they took part in a basketball activity not recognized by the NBA. A drills showcase from both teams were hastily organized in place of the scheduled exhibition game, which was negatively received by the paying patrons of the event. The organizers offered refunds for the ticket holders after the first exhibition game was cancelled. Subsequently, the scheduled activities for July 23, which included a meet-and-greet event at SM Megamall and the second exhibition game at the Smart Araneta Coliseum, were cancelled.

== Background ==
The event was first announced through the Twitter account of PLDT chairman and Samahang Basketbol ng Pilipinas president Manny V. Pangilinan on June 25, 2014. In his Twitter post, he announced that NBA players Blake Griffin, Damian Lillard, DeMar DeRozan and Paul Pierce would take part in two exhibition games scheduled on July 22 and 23 against Gilas Pilipinas, the Philippine men's basketball team, who are preparing for the 2014 FIBA World Cup. The national team's coach, Chot Reyes also confirmed the event through his Twitter account. Skills coach John Lucas II will also conduct a skills training camp during the event. Ticket prices were announced days later through Ticketnet, the ticketing arm of the Smart Araneta Coliseum, ranging from Php 23,330 (US$538.35) in the patron section to Php 750 (US$17.33) in the general admission section.

On July 1, the organizers announced that Kyle Lowry, Nick Johnson and 2014 NBA Finals MVP Kawhi Leonard would also take part with the event. Paul George was later added to the lineup according to Pangilinan in a post from his Twitter account on July 14. A day later, James Harden, Tyson Chandler and Brandon Jennings were confirmed to be part of the event. They also announced that Paul Pierce had pulled out of the event.

The event was organized by East-West Private LLC, a US-based events organizing company, who had been responsible for bringing in Kobe Bryant and Kevin Durant, among others, to play in an exhibition game in the Philippines in 2011, entitled Smart Ultimate All-Star Weekend, while an NBA lockout was ongoing.

== Event ==
Hours before the start of the first exhibition game on July 22, the organizers confirmed that Blake Griffin and Paul George had backed out of the event. In a video posted on the internet, Griffin apologized to the Filipino fans for not coming because "something from home needed my urgent attention". In a separate report, George cited "personal reasons" as the cause of his sudden pull-out. Matt Barnes became their last-minute replacement.

After the traditional call up of players to the basketball court, Gilas Pilipinas coach Chot Reyes told the audience that the Gilas team and the NBA players would not be playing an exhibition game and would instead participate in a live open practice session. PLDT Vice President Ariel Fermin then told the crowd that if they were not satisfied with the event, the organizers would be offering a full refund for the purchased tickets. He reminded the audience that the proceeds of the event will be given to charity, saying "Tulungan niyo kaming tulungan ang ibang tao (Help us help other people), after all, this is really for a good cause."

The event started with skills coach John Lucas II giving instructions to the players on drills, which were broken down in seven-minute segments. At first, the audience were responding positively with the drills, but as time went on, boos from the crowd started erupting after they realized that there will be no five-on-five game that night. When the event finished, the audience began to chant "REFUND! REFUND! REFUND!"

In a hastily called press conference, and in an official statement issued that same day, PLDT chairman Manny Pangilinan apologized to the basketball fans "for disappointing them". He also cancelled the events planned for the second day. He said that refunds would be made to those people who had purchased tickets. During the press conference, East West Holdings official Maria Espaldon told the media that they had not been able to secure clearance from the NBA to hold the event. In the hopes of having the event comply with the NBA's rules, the organizers set it up as a "basketball clinic" that also included a five-on-five scrimmage between the NBA players and the Gilas team. She also said that the event was never advertised as a game. Hours before the start of the event, the NBA players received calls from representatives of the league, who warned them that they were subject to possible fines and league suspensions should they take part in the activity.

On July 23, the NBA released a press statement regarding the reported intervention of the league in the charity event. East-West Private LLC failed to secure the clearance needed from the NBA for their players to be allowed to participate in the event, as stated in the league's collective bargaining agreement, even after they informed the promoters about the process "several months ago".

== Aftermath ==
The organizers reportedly spent up to ₱200 million (US$4.6 million) for the event and paid the participating players up to US$150,000 each. The Games and Amusements Board, the Philippine government agency responsible on regulating professional sports events warned that sanctions will be served to the organizers, and may be liable for misleading the public that a basketball exhibition game would be held during the event.

Refunds for the tickets were processed starting on July 24. Ticket holders who bought the tickets through Ticketnet were advised to go to the Smart Araneta Coliseum box office to claim their refunds. For those who bought the tickets online, their credit card charges were to be reversed.
