= Basilan Steel =

Professional basketball team in Basilan, Philippines

- 2026 Basilan Steel season
- League: MPBL (2018–2021, 2025–present); VisMin (2021–2022); PSL (2021–2022)
- Founded: 2018; 8 years ago
- History: Basilan Steel; 2018–2021, 2026–present Basilan-BRT Peace Riders; 2021–2022; Basilan Viva Portmasters; 2025; Basilan Starhorse; 2025
- Arena: Lamitan Capitol Gym
- Location: Basilan
- Team colors
- Main sponsor: Anak Mindanao
- Head coach: Arnold Oliveros
- Championships: VisMin: 1 (2021 – 1st)

The Basilan Steel is a Philippine professional basketball team based in Lamitan, Basilan. The team competes in the Maharlika Pilipinas Basketball League (MPBL) as a member of the league's South Division. The team most recently played its home games at Lamitan Capitol Gym.

The team began play in the 2018–19 MPBL season as part of the league's national expansion. In 2021, they renamed as the Basilan Peace Riders upon moving to the Pilipinas VisMin Super Cup, where they won their only league championship. In 2022, the team moved leagues once again, this time to the Pilipinas Super League (PSL).

In November 2024, the team was revived for the 2025 MPBL season under the backing of Starhorse Shipping Lines. The team initially went by the temporary name of Basilan Viva Portmasters before changing to Basilan Starhorse mid-season. In 2026, the team went back to their original name.

The Basilan franchise is one of five teams based in Mindanao and the lone team based in the Bangsamoro region.

== History ==
=== 2018–2021: First MPBL stint ===
The Basilan Steel was founded as one of sixteen expansion teams for the MPBL's 2018–19, as one of five expansion teams from the Visayas and Mindanao. The team was originally going to be called the Basilan Shooters, but was renamed since it may be associated with violence. Their application was accepted by the league in May 2018 who reasoned that they want to show the beauty of Basilan "through basketball".

In the 2018–19 season, the team finished with a 7–18 record, giving the team the second-worst record in the South Division. In the 2019–20 season, Basilan won 20 of the 30 games that season, awarding them with the division's third seed. After defeating Iloilo and then Bacoor City, the team reached the division finals against the Davao Occidental Tigers.

=== South Division finals fallout ===
The series was tied 1-1 before the COVID-19 pandemic suspended the playoffs for one year. When the league resumed play with a bubble in Subic, Basilan had some of its players tested positive for COVID-19, thus ruling them out of the bubble and putting an abrupt end to the season. Davao Occidental would go on to advance to the national finals and eventually win the championship.

=== 2021: Pilipinas VisMin Super Cup ===
Basilan moved to the Pilipinas VisMin Super Cup as one of its inaugural teams, going by the name Basilan Peace Riders, marking the team's first professional stint. After going undefeated in the Mindanao leg of the 1st Conference, Basilan was granted an instant berth into the Mindanao finals against the fourth-seeded Roxas Vanguards. The Peace Riders swept the Vanguards to advance to the First Conference finals against KCS Computer Specialist – Mandaue. In the best-of-five series, Basilan beat Manduae 3–0 to win their first-ever league championship.

=== 2021: Brief return to the MPBL ===
The team returned for the 2021 Invitational, going by the name Basilan Jumbo Plastic. The team was given the group's first seed as a reward for winning the Pilipinas VisMin Super Cup 1st Conference. After defeating Mindoro and Pasig, the team made it to the winner-takes-all finals against the Nueva Ecija Rice Vanguards. With 1.9 seconds remaining in overtime and the score tied at 80, Philip Manalang made the championship-winning buzzer beater to give Basilan the MPBL Invitational title.

=== 2022: Pilipinas Super League ===
The Basilan Steel transferred yet again, this time to the Pilipinas Super League alongside the Davao Occidental Tigers. In the 2022 Pearl of the Orient Cup, Basilan finished on 8–6 and ranked 4th. In the semifinals, Basilan faced the first-seeded Davao Occidental, but was swept in the series. The team then lost the third-place game against second-seeded Roxas Vanguards.

=== 2025–present: Revival and full-time return to the MPBL ===
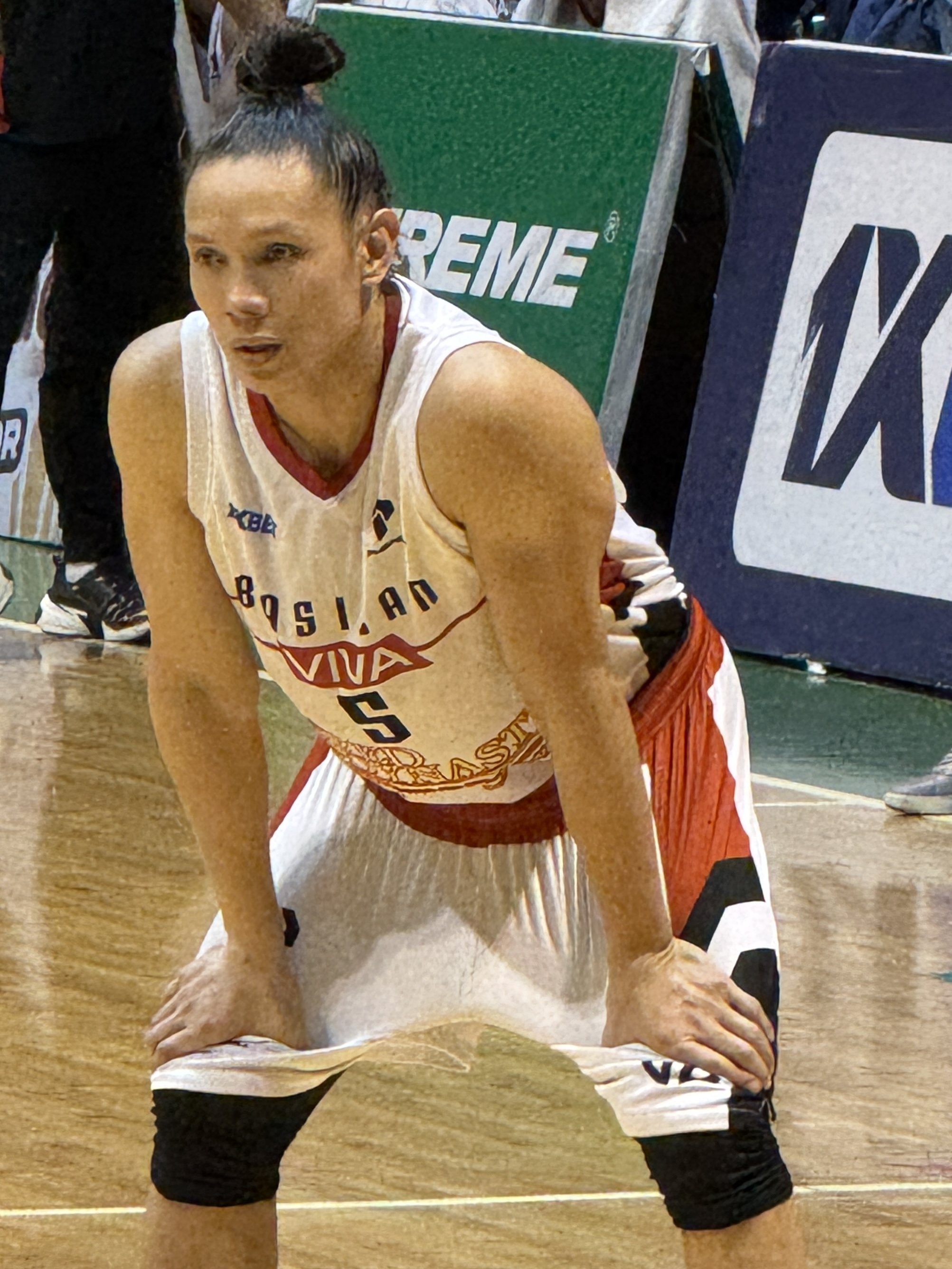
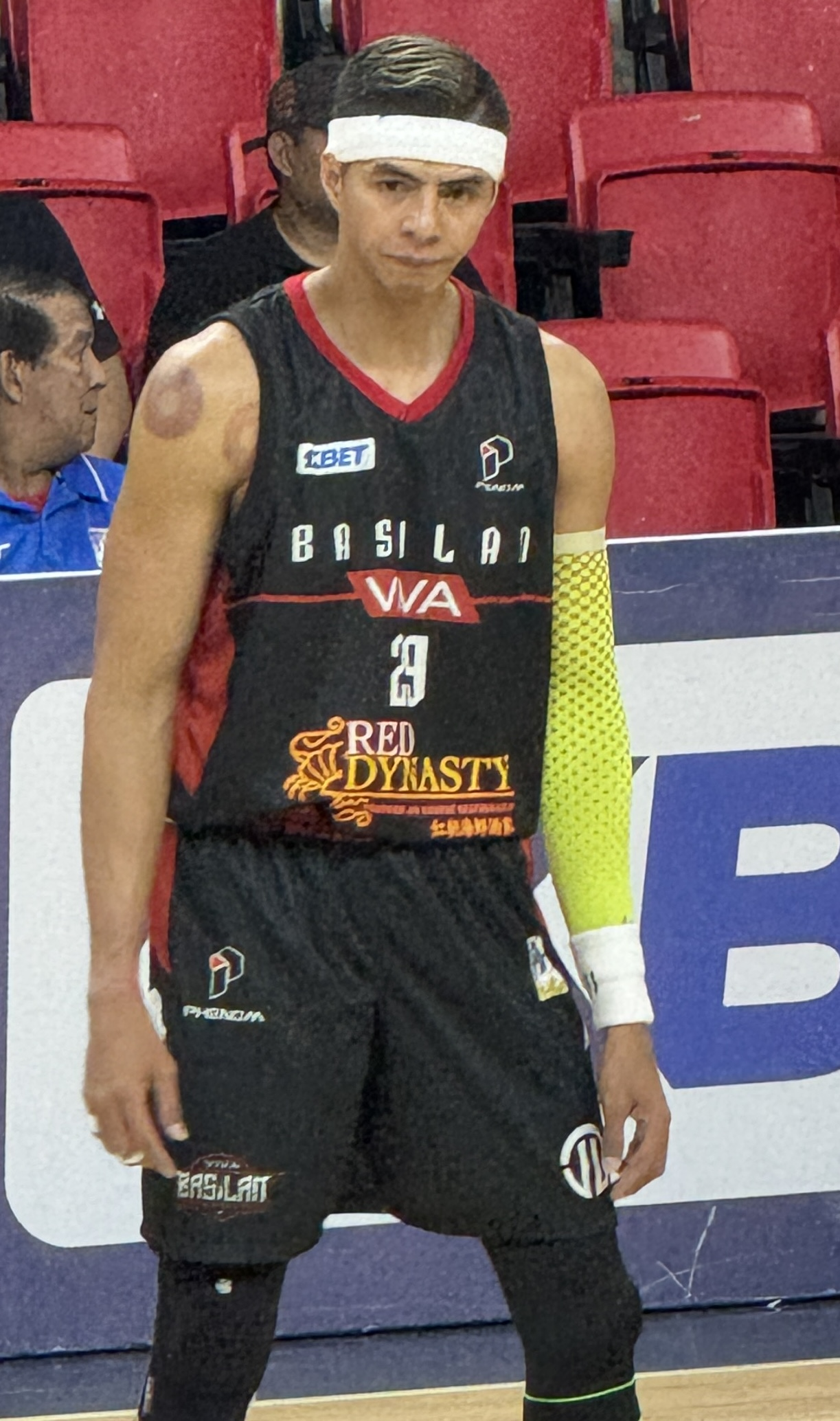
The team's revival in 2025 was noted for the acquisitions of PBA veterans Alex Cabagnot (left) and Arwind Santos (middle).

On November 27, 2024, in an interview with Snow Badua on SPIN.ph, Sumisip mayor Julz Hataman announced the revival of the Basilan franchise and its full-time return to the MPBL. Funding the team's comeback to the regional league was shipping company Starhorse Shipping Lines.

Ahead of the 2025 season, the team acquired PBA veterans Alex Cabagnot and Arwind Santos as well as all-stars Rabeh Al-Hussaini, Emman Calo, and Jeff Viernes to join the returning team. The team also appointed Mac Tan, who won the inaugural MPBL championship with the Batangas City Athletics, as the head coach. Former PBA players Rich Alvarez and Rob Labagala also join the coaching staff as two of four assistants. Mid-season, the team also acquired Greg Slaughter, who was previously with the Manila SV Batang Sampaloc in 2024.

For the 2026 season, the team reverted back the name to the Basilan Steel.

== Team identity ==
Former logos used under the sponsorship of Starhorse Shipping Lines.

=== Name ===
The team was initially going to go by the Basilan Shooters, but management decided to change the name due to the name's violent connotations. The name Steel was derived from the idea that name of the team's home province came from the Yakan word "Besih" which means steel. Basilan was known for its abundant iron ore deposits which was used for sword and other weapons by early Filipinos. For the team's revival as the Basilan Starhorse, and temporarily the Viva Portmasters, most of the logo's shape is retained alongside the "BASILAN" text.

=== Logo ===
The team's first logo consists of a Moro in traditional Yakan garments and a kalis. An indigenous sword with a wavy blade takes the shape of the "I" in "BASILAN". The logo was designed by Arjay Hije under Chronos Athletics. The logo was abandoned when the team changed their name to Basilan Peace Riders. The logo was used again for Basilan's men's volleyball team in 2021. For the team's revival as the Starhorse, the shape of the logo remains largely the same, with the exception of a knight chess piece replacing the Moro image in the logo.

=== Color scheme ===
The team has always used a red and black color scheme, but initially, it was going to be gold and black. According to Hije, black represents the perception of Basilan as a war-torn arena, while gold represented Basilan as a place where people "can live joyfully and harmoniously". Gold would be eventually used for the Steel Spikers' logo.

== Personnel ==
=== Current roster ===
Basilan Steel roster
Players

Pos.	No.	Name	Height	Weight	DOB	From
G	3	Neil Owens (FF)	6 ft 1 in (1.85 m)		2001-06-16	Far Eastern
G	6	JVee Casio	5 ft 10 in (1.78 m)	175 lb (79 kg)	1986–09–01	De La Salle
G	7	Joshua Miguel Marcos	6 ft 2 in (1.88 m)			St. Benilde
F	9	Mark Sangco	6 ft 5 in (1.96 m)		1999–10–02	St. Benilde
G	10	Ralph Robin	5 ft 10 in (1.78 m)			Emilio Aguinaldo
G	11	John Wilson	6 ft 2 in (1.88 m)	185 lb (84 kg)	1987–01–18	José Rizal
G/F	12	Tyron Chan	6 ft 2 in (1.88 m)		1991–11–09	Centro Escolar
G	13	Mac Tallo	6 ft 0 in (1.83 m)	187 lb (85 kg)	1994-01-02	Southwestern-U
F	14	Johnnel Bauzon	6 ft 4 in (1.93 m)
G	15	Bobby Balucanag	6 ft 0 in (1.83 m)			San Sebastian
C	16	Jayson Grimaldo	6 ft 5 in (1.96 m)	180 lb (82 kg)		MLQU
F	18	Mark Montuaño	6 ft 2 in (1.88 m)			Informatics
F	20	Jervy Cruz	6 ft 4 in (1.93 m)	220 lb (100 kg)	1986–09–09	UST
G	23	Kenneth Mocon	5 ft 10 in (1.78 m)	185 lb (84 kg)	1993–10–13	San Beda
G/F	24	Jan Niccolo Jamon	6 ft 2 in (1.88 m)			Emilio Aguinaldo
G	27	Gabriel Cometa	5 ft 11 in (1.80 m)			St. Benilde
G	30	Rashedin Tinggamo (HG)	5 ft 7 in (1.70 m)
G	33	Eumir Marcial (HG)	5 ft 11 in (1.80 m)		1995–10–29
G/F	51	Byron Villarias	6 ft 0 in (1.83 m)	172 lb (78 kg)	1988–02–25	José Rizal
G	66	Angel Blanquesna	5 ft 11 in (1.80 m)
F	99	Khymer Adam Olaso (HG)	6 ft 7 in (2.01 m)

Coaches

Head coach

- Arnold Oliveros

Assistant coach(es)

- JC Foronda
- Andre Oliveros
- Bobedick delos Santos
- Jay Dela Cruz

Team manager

- Raymund Salve

Legend

- (HG) Homegrown
- (FF) Filipino-foreigner
- (EA) EASL player
- (RS) Reserve player
- (S) Suspended
- Injured

- Roster via Genius Sports (MPBL)
Updated as of: June 22, 2026

=== Head coaches ===
Basilan Steel head coaches
#	Name	Start	End	Achievements	Ref.
1	Joseph Romarate	2018	2018	—	
2	Jerson Cabiltes	2018	2021	—	
3	Mac Tan	2025	2025	—	
4	Rich Alvarez	2025	2025	—	
5	Arnold Oliveros	2026	current	—	

== Notable players ==
=== Individual award winners ===
VisMin Most Valuable Player

- Hesed Gabo – 2021 (1st)

VisMin Mythical Team

- Hesed Gabo – 2021 (1st)
- Michael Mabulac – 2021 (1st)

PSL Mythical Team

- Jason Melano – 2022

=== All-Stars ===
MPBL All-Star selections

- Jojo Tangkay – 2019
- Allyn Bulanadi – 2020

=== PBA players ===
Ex-PBA players

- Rabeh Al-Hussaini
- Juneric Baloria
- Alex Cabagnot
- Anthony Bringas
- Jervy Cruz
- Dennis Daa
- Michael Juico
- Michael Mabulac
- Rey Publico
- Arwind Santos
- Encho Serrano
- Jojo Tangkay
- Jeff Viernes

Drafted to PBA

- Hesed Gabo – undrafted, 2019 (later signed)
- Mario Barasi – 13th overall, season 50

=== Other notable players ===
- Eumir Marcial

== Season-by-season records ==
League champions
Division champions
Qualified for playoffs
Best regular season record

=== Maharlika Pilipinas Basketball League ===
Season	Regular season							Playoffs	
Season	Division	Finish	GP	W	L	PCT	GB	Stage	Results
Basilan Steel
2018–19; Datu Cup	South	12th	25	7	18	.280	13	Did not qualify	
2019–20; Lakan Season	South	3rd	30	20	10	.667	6	Division quarterfinals Division semifinals Division finals	won vs. Iloilo, 2–0 won vs. Bacoor City, 2–1 lost vs. Davao Occidental, 1–2
Did not participate from 2022 to 2024
Basilan Starhorse
2025	South	4th	29	18	11	.621	7	Division quarterfinals	lost vs. General Santos, 1–2
Basilan Steel
2026	South	8th	25	13	12	.520	8	Clinched play-in, to be determined	
All-time regular season record			109	58	51	.532		2 playoff appearances	
All-time playoff record			11	6	5	.545		0 finals appearances	
All-time overall record			120	64	56	.533		0 championships	

=== Pilipinas VisMin Super Cup ===
Season	Elimination round					Playoffs	
Season	Leg	Finish	W	L	PCT	Stage	Results
Basilan Peace Riders
2021 – 1st	Mindanao	1st	8	0	1.000	Mindanao finals VisMin finals	won vs. Roxas, 2–0 won vs. Mandaue, 3–0
2021 – 2nd Mindanao Challenge	None	6th	5	7	.417	Quarterfinals	lost vs. Kapatagan, 60–64
All-time elimination round record			13	7	.650	2 playoff appearances	
All-time playoff record			5	1	.833	1 finals appearance	
All-time overall record			18	7	.720	1 championship	

=== Pilipinas Super League ===
Season	Elimination round				Playoffs	
Season	Finish	W	L	PCT	Stage	Results
Basilan Peace Riders
2022; Pearl of the Orient Cup	4th	8	6	.571	Semifinals; Battle for Third	lost vs. Davao Occidental, 0–2 lost vs. Roxas, 59–66 (single-game)
All-time elimination round record		8	6	.571	1 playoff appearance	
All-time playoff record		0	3	.000	0 finals appearances	
All-time overall record		18	7	.471	0 championships	

== See also ==
- Basilan Steel Spikers
