= Bounty Agro Ventures =

Poultry company, Philippines

- Type: Private
- Industry: Food / Retail
- Founded: 1997; 29 years ago
- Founder: Tennyson Chen
- Headquarters: The Taipan Place, Garnet Rd., Ortigas Center, Pasig, Metro Manila, Philippines
- Areas served: Philippines, Malaysia
- Key people: Ronald Daniel D. Mascariñas (President and General Manager)
- Products: dressed chicken, rotisserie
- Brands: Adobo Connection; Bounty Fresh; Chooks-to-Go; Reyal; Uling Roasters
- Website: bavi.com.ph

Bounty Agro Ventures, Inc. (BAVI), also known as Bounty, is a poultry company based in Pasig, Metro Manila, Philippines. As the main company of the Bounty Fresh Group of Companies, it manages roast chicken retail chains Chooks-to-Go and Uling Roasters, Reyal Litson Manok, Adobo Connection, and HeiHei.

== History ==
Bounty Agro Ventures, Inc. was established in 1997 as a family business of Tennyson Chen. The company initially started as a supplier of dressed whole chickens and chicken parts under the Bounty Fresh brand to retailers. Chen has been involved in the poultry business as early as the 1980s, who began with a layer farm in Santa Maria, Bulacan with 5,000 chickens.

The company was threatened by the gradual implementation of the ASEAN Free Trade Area of the late-1990s and faced fiercer competition from other producers in Southeast Asia, particularly in Thailand, which could offer larger chicken at the same price Bounty offers. The implementation of the free trade area led to Bounty's later expansion to sell cooked chicken.

By 2002, Bounty started serving its chicken products under vacuum packaging, being the first company to do so in the local market. At around that time Bounty has a ten percent share of the market.

In 2008, Bounty launched the Chooks-to-Go rotisserie chain, which was initially known as Bounty Fresh Oven Roasted Chicken. It set up a second brand, Uling Roasters which sells charcoal-roasted chicken.

== Sports ==
Bounty Agro Ventures has been involved in Philippine 3x3 basketball sponsoring events under its Chooks-to-Go brand. It has organized the Manok ng Bayan–SBP 3X3, a youth tournament meant to garner FIBA ranking points as part of the 3x3 national team's qualification bid to the 2020 Summer Olympics and the Chooks-to-Go Pilipinas 3x3, a 3x3 league sanctioned by the Samahang Basketbol ng Pilipinas, the Philippines' national governing body for basketball. The company also has sent pro-circuit teams under the Chooks-to-Go name in the FIBA 3x3 World Tour.
