= Alcantara, Cebu =

Municipality in Cebu, Philippines

Alcantara
- Municipality
- Municipality of Alcantara
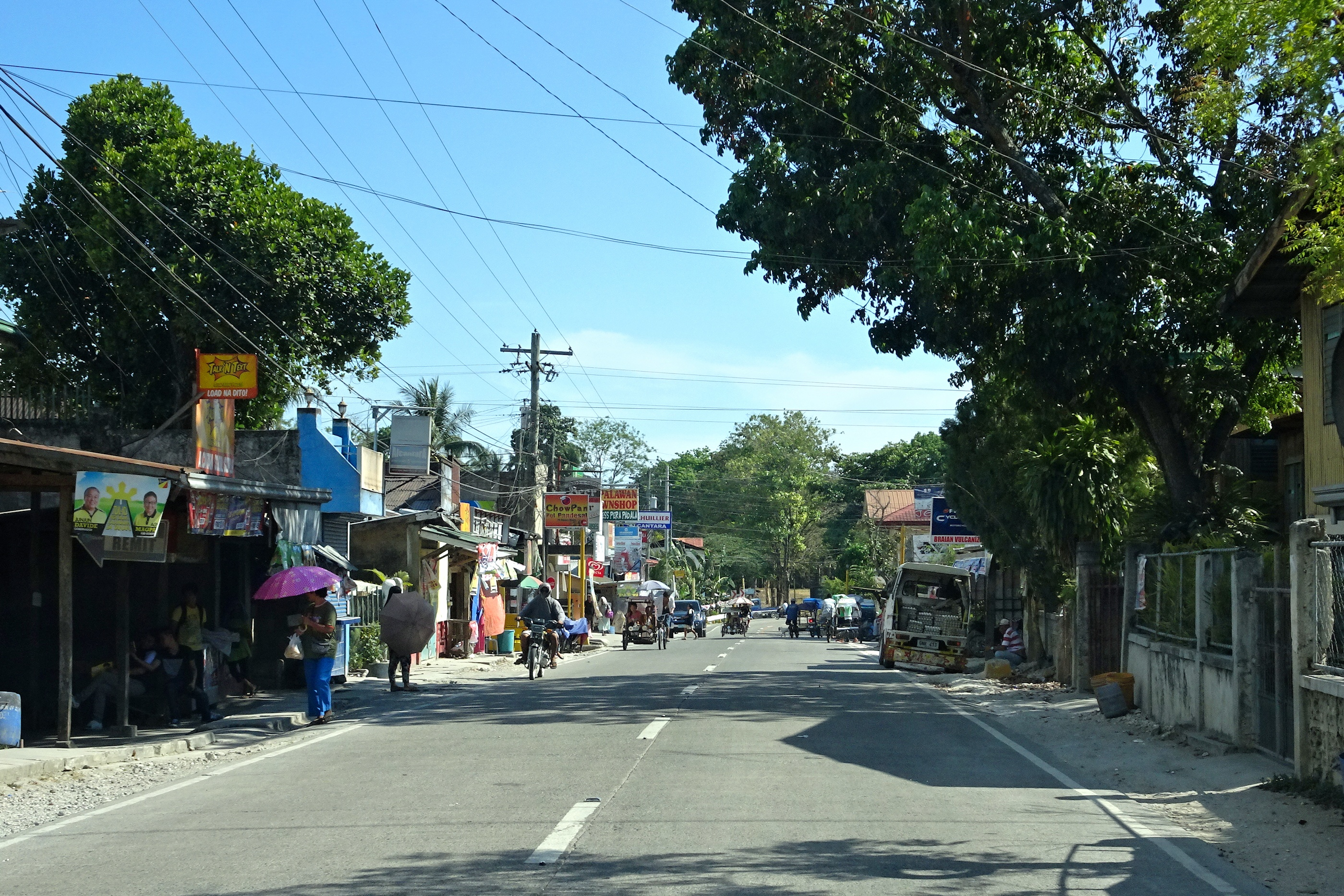
- Alcantara, Cebu – National road

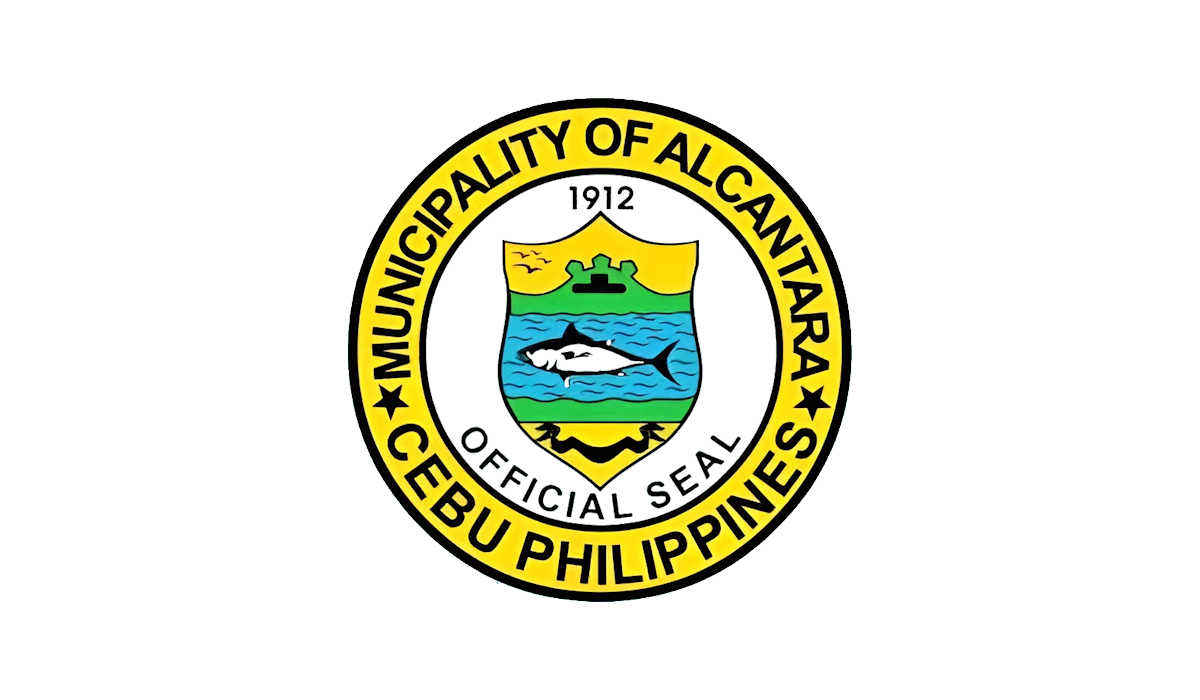
- Flag

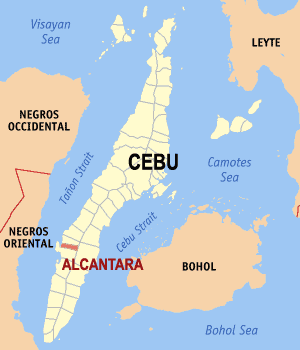
- Map of Cebu with Alcantara highlighted
- Interactive map of Alcantara
- Location within the Philippines
- Coordinates: 9°58′18″N 123°24′17″E
- Country: Philippines
- Region: Central Visayas
- Province: Cebu
- District: 7th district
- Founded: 1830
- Named for: Alcántara, Spain
- Barangays: 9 (see Barangays)

Government
  - Type: Sangguniang Bayan
  - Mayor: Fritz A. Lastimoso
  - Vice Mayor: Larry M. Llenos
  - Representative: Peter John D. Calderon
  - Municipal Council: Members: Florencio T. Basilisco; Julio A. Bayato; Marvin T. Pulgo; Beatriz Y. Caburnay; Joshua Jeff B. Catapusan; Richard C. Pulgo; Andres T. Timtim; Henry C. Rabino
  - Electorate: 12,612 voters (2025)

Area
  - Total: 35.20 km^{2} (13.59 sq mi)
- Elevation: 47 m (154 ft)
- Highest elevation: 297 m (974 ft)
- Lowest elevation: 0 m (0 ft)

Population (2024 census)
  - Total: 17,490
  - Density: 496.9/km^{2} (1,287/sq mi)
  - Households: 4,384

Economy
  - Income class: 4th municipal income class
  - Poverty incidence: 24.37% (2023)
  - Revenue: ₱ 107.1 million (2024)
  - Assets: ₱ 357.3 million (2024)
  - Expenditure: ₱ 60.5 million (2024)
  - Liabilities: ₱ 51.82 million (2024)

Service provider
  - Electricity: Cebu 1 Electric Cooperative (CEBECO 1)
- Time zone: UTC+8 (PST)
- ZIP code: 6033
- PSGC: 072201000
- IDD : area code: +63 (0)32
- Native languages: Cebuano; Tagalog

Alcantara, officially the Municipality of Alcantara (Cebuano: Lungsod sa Alcantara; Tagalog: Bayan ng Alcantara), is a municipality in the province of Cebu, Philippines. According to the 2024 census, it has a population of 17,490 people.

== Geography ==
Alcantara is bordered to the north by the town of Ronda, to the west is the Tañon Strait, to the east is the town of Argao, and to the south is the town of Moalboal. It is 95 kilometres (59 mi) from Cebu City.

Alcantara is one of the eight municipalities comprising the 7th Congressional District Cebu Province.

=== Barangays ===
Alcantara is politically subdivided into 9 barangays. Each barangay consists of puroks and some have sitios.

PSGC	Barangay	Population			±% p.a.	
		2024		2010		
072201001	Cabadiangan	5.5%	968	913	▴	0.41%
072201002	Cabil‑isan	4.9%	854	708	▴	1.31%
072201003	Candabong	13.8%	2,421	2,142	▴	0.86%
072201004	Lawaan	9.8%	1,706	1,438	▴	1.20%
072201005	Manga	11.4%	1,995	1,693	▴	1.15%
072201006	Palanas	15.2%	2,651	2,314	▴	0.95%
072201007	Poblacion	14.0%	2,440	2,438	▴	0.01%
072201008	Polo	8.6%	1,508	1,337	▴	0.84%
072201009	Salagmaya	3.5%	617	573	▴	0.52%
	Total		17,490	13,556	▴	1.79%

=== Climate ===
Climate data for Alcantara, Cebu
Month	Jan	Feb	Mar	Apr	May	Jun	Jul	Aug	Sep	Oct	Nov	Dec	Year
Mean daily maximum °C (°F)	29 (84)	30 (86)	31 (88)	32 (90)	31 (88)	30 (86)	30 (86)	30 (86)	30 (86)	29 (84)	29 (84)	29 (84)	30 (86)
Mean daily minimum °C (°F)	23 (73)	22 (72)	23 (73)	24 (75)	25 (77)	25 (77)	24 (75)	24 (75)	24 (75)	24 (75)	24 (75)	23 (73)	24 (75)
Average precipitation mm (inches)	42 (1.7)	34 (1.3)	40 (1.6)	61 (2.4)	124 (4.9)	188 (7.4)	190 (7.5)	191 (7.5)	189 (7.4)	186 (7.3)	124 (4.9)	73 (2.9)	1,442 (56.8)
Average rainy days	10.0	8.5	9.5	12.8	22.3	26.8	28.4	27.9	27.3	27.6	20.5	13.1	234.7
Source: Meteoblue

== Demographics ==
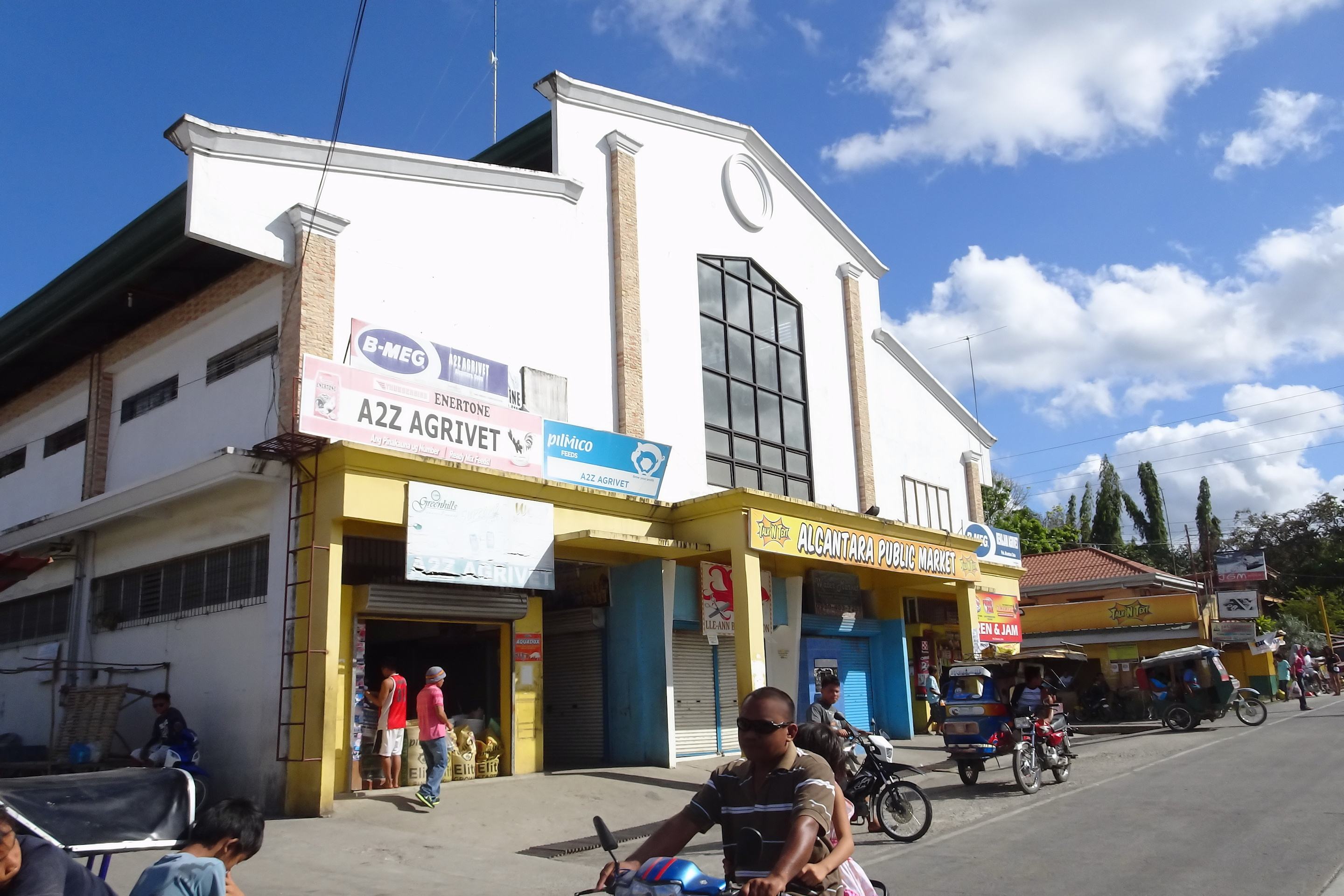
Alcantara Public Market

Population census of Alcantara
Year	Pop.	±% p.a.
1903	4,698	—
1918	5,958	+1.60%
1939	5,754	−0.17%
1948	5,771	+0.03%
1960	5,625	−0.21%
1970	6,866	+2.01%
1975	7,752	+2.46%
1980	7,882	+0.33%
1990	9,559	+1.95%
1995	10,224	+1.27%
2000	11,532	+2.61%
2007	13,036	+1.71%
2010	13,556	+1.43%
2015	15,160	+2.15%
2020	16,910	+2.33%
2024	17,490	+0.81%
Source: Philippine Statistics Authority

== Economy ==
Poverty incidence of Alcantara

Source: Philippine Statistics Authority

== Education ==
The public schools in the town of Alcantara are administered by one school district under the Schools Division of Cebu Province.

Elementary schools:

- Alcantara Central Elementary School — Poblacion
- Cabil-isan Elementary School — Cabil-isan
- Candabong Elementary School — Candabong
- Lawaan Elementary School — Lawaan
- Manga Elementary School — Manga
- Palanas Elementary School — Palanas
- Polo Elementary School — Polo
- Salagmaya Elementary School — Salagmaya

High schools:

- Alcantara National High School — Poblacion

Integrated schools:

- Cabadiangan Integrated School — Cabadiangan

Private schools:

- Saint Augustine Academy, Inc. — Poblacion
