= Chooks-to-Go =

Philippine restaurant chain

- Product type: Food chain
- Current owner: Bounty Agro Ventures
- Country: Philippines
- Introduced: 2008; 18 years ago
- Markets: Philippines
- Tagline: "Masarap kahit walang sauce!" (lit. "Delicious even without sauce!")
- Website: chookstogo.com.ph

Chooks-to-Go is a chain of stores owned by Bounty Agro Ventures, Inc. (BAVI), a privately owned company operating in the Philippines. It offers roast chicken and processed meat for take-out.

== History ==
Chooks-to-Go is a brand of Bounty Agro Ventures, Inc. (BAVI), a company established in 1997 that was originally engaged in selling raw poultry products. The influx of cheaper raw poultry goods from other Southeast Asian countries with the implementation of the ASEAN Free Trade Area in the late 1990s led BAVI to set up Chooks-to-Go, a retail chain that sells roast chicken products.

Chooks-to-Go was launched by BAVI in 2008. Its name combines "chooks" (the Australian casual term for chicken) with "to-go" to indicate its take-out-only format.

== Operations ==
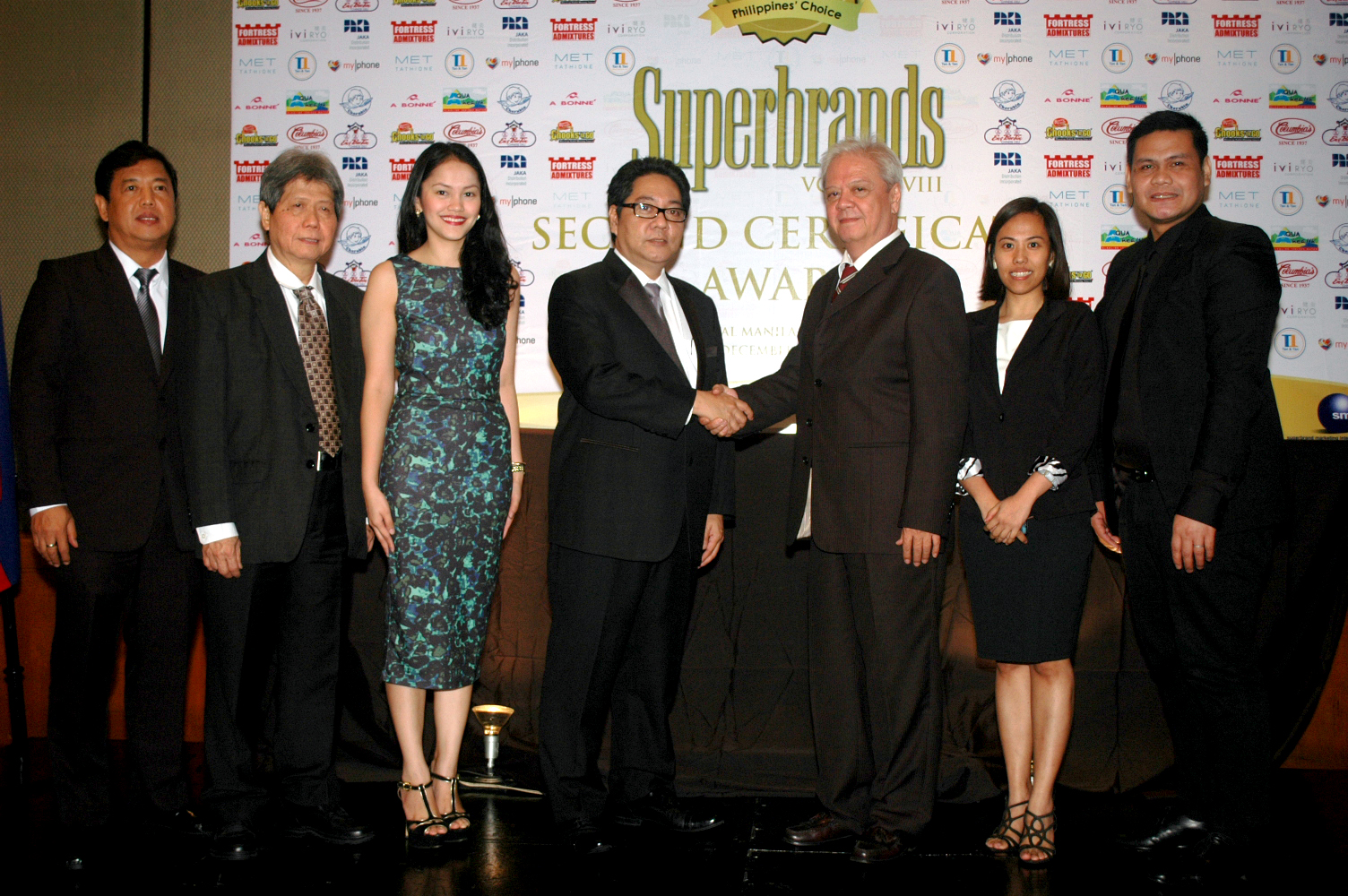
Chooks-to-Go team at the awarding ceremony, "Volume VIII Second Certificate Superbrands Accreditation and Awarding of Certificate" held December 11, 2013.

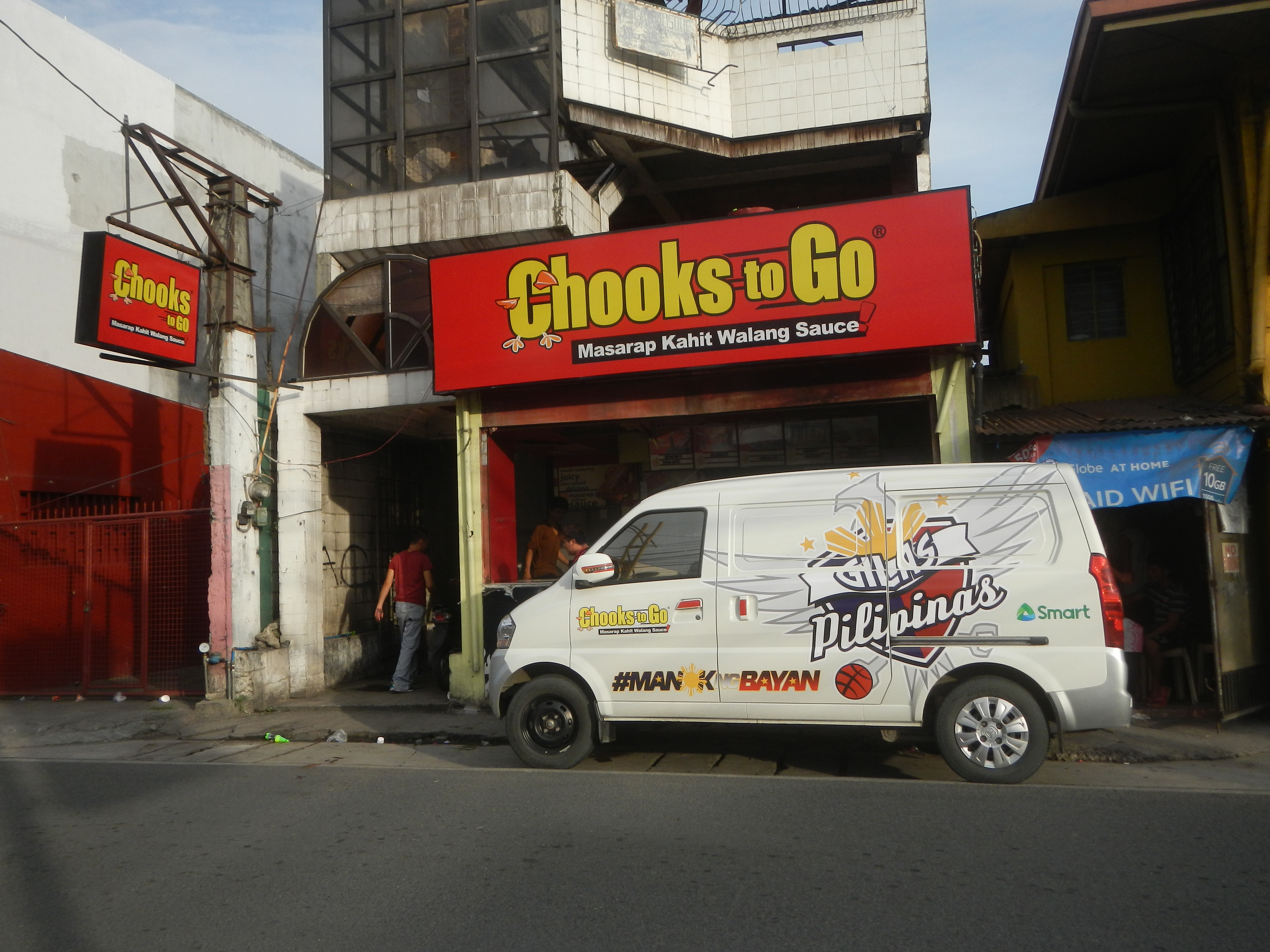
Take-out store with Gilas-#Manok Ng Bayan van

Store personnel are trained and constantly evaluated to maintain high standards of operation and quality of service. Recent results from a UAI study by Consumer Vibe Asia (2012 Project Seneca) showed a satisfaction score of 7.5 out of 10, for Chooks-to-Go in the food services arena. To keep quality at the desired level, the brand established the BAVI Academy, which provides in-house training for outlet personnel, and other areas of operations.

Chooks-to-Go has a delivery service for certain areas for a minimal fixed delivery fee of ₱30. Customer Service Associates take telephone orders and relay these to hubs, with software automatically determining the nearest hub based on customer location.

For marketing, Chooks-to-Go periodically conducts promotions, which may be on a national or local level. Site selection guidelines are strictly observed, while pre-opening campaigns for new stores are held and in-store merchandising is standardized.

In 2024, Chooks-to-Go has 1,800 take-out stores with 37 dine-in restaurants nationwide. CEO Kenneth Cheng announced its expansion with additional 100 take-out stores and 40 more dine-in stores, in line with its "Food Made Better" and #Manok Ng Bayan advertising campaigns.

== See also ==
- Chooks-to-Go Pilipinas
- Tacloban Fighting Warays
- List of restaurant chains in the Philippines
