= Roxas, Zamboanga del Norte =

Municipality in Zamboanga del Norte, Philippines

Roxas
- Municipality
- Municipality of President Manuel A. Roxas
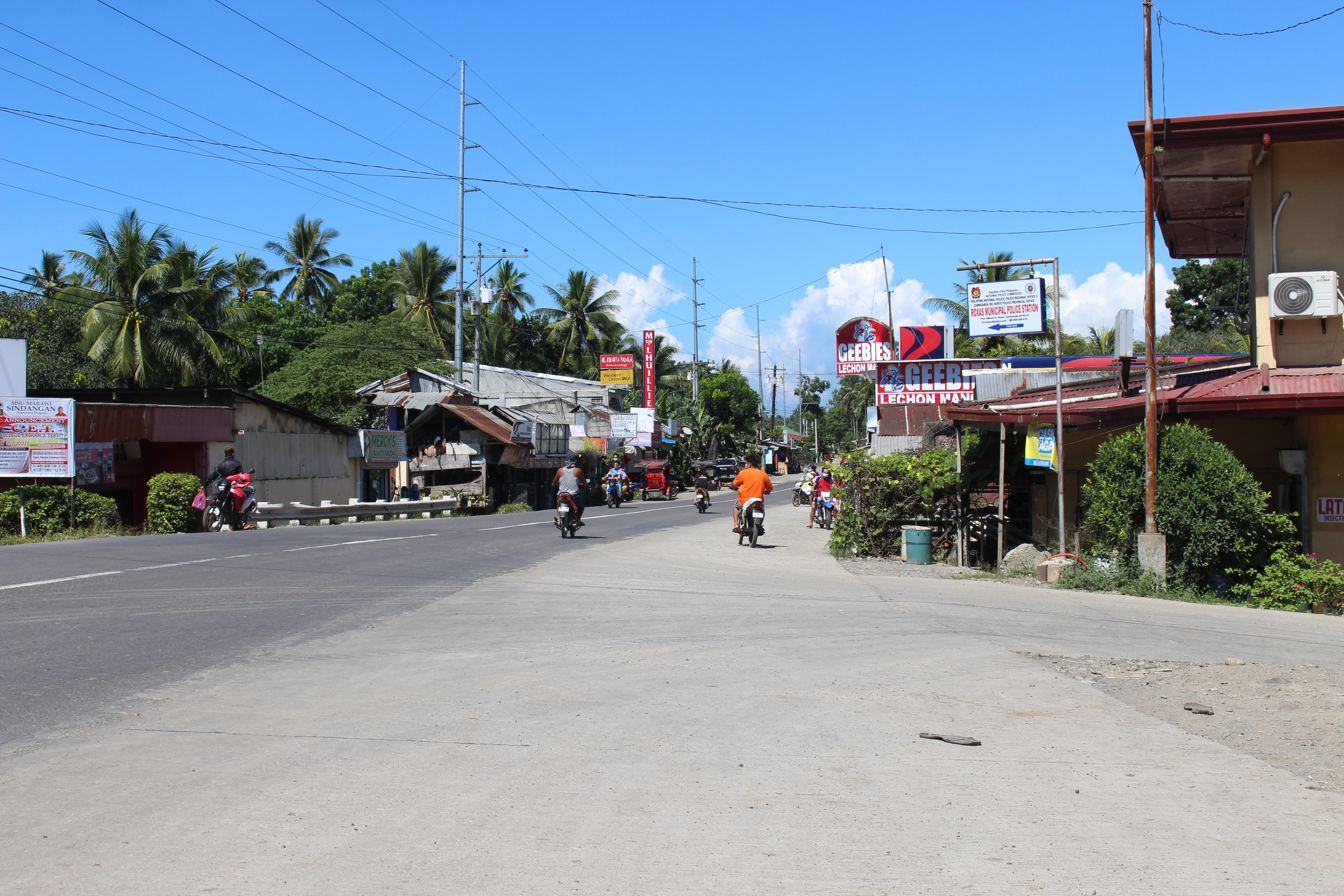
- Portion of Poblacion

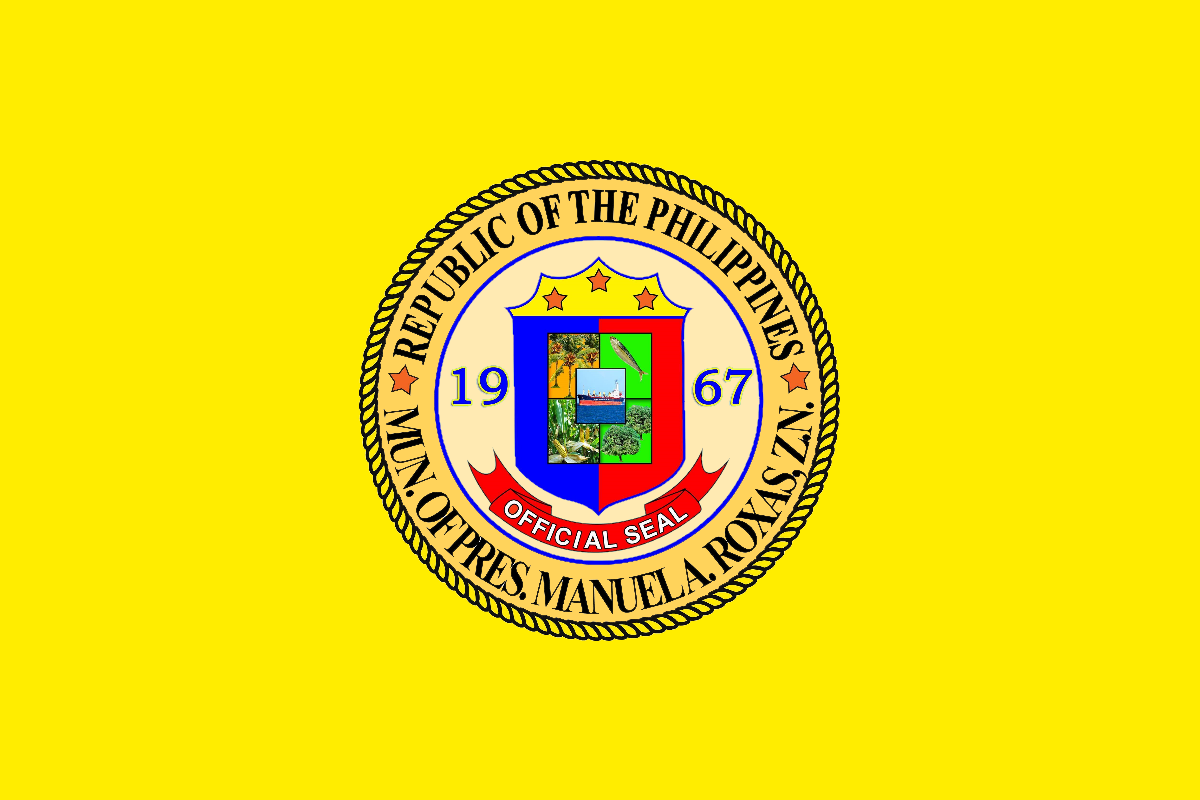
- Flag Seal
- Nickname: Industrial Capital of Zamboanga del Norte
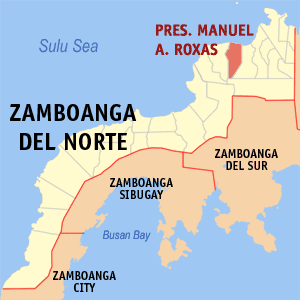
- Map of Zamboanga del Norte with Roxas highlighted
- Interactive map of Roxas
- Location within the Philippines
- Coordinates: 8°31′11″N 123°13′40″E
- Country: Philippines
- Region: Zamboanga Peninsula
- Province: Zamboanga del Norte
- District: 2nd district
- Founded: June 17, 1967
- Named for: Manuel Roxas
- Barangays: 31 (see Barangays)

Government
  - Type: Sangguniang Bayan
  - Mayor: Ismael A. Rengquijo Jr. (Lakas)
  - Vice Mayor: Rolando G. Yebes Jr. (Lakas)
  - Representative: Irene G. Labadlabad (Lakas)
  - Municipal Council: Members: Raymond G. Denolan; Roderick G. Alam; Constancio O. Tao Jr.; Expedito A. Lagorra; Leonilo M. Inggo; Mardonio H. Tagad Jr.; Michael D. Pondol; Jimema M. Chato
  - Electorate: 28,550 voters (2025)

Area
  - Total: 206.25 km^{2} (79.63 sq mi)
- Elevation: 31 m (102 ft)
- Highest elevation: 217 m (712 ft)
- Lowest elevation: 0 m (0 ft)

Population (2024 census)
  - Total: 38,649
  - Density: 187.39/km^{2} (485.34/sq mi)
  - Households: 9,798

Economy
  - Income class: 1st municipal income class
  - Poverty incidence: 50.3% (2023)
  - Revenue: ₱ 240.9 million (2024)
  - Assets: ₱ 523 million (2024)
  - Expenditure: ₱ 145.8 million (2024)
  - Liabilities: ₱ 149.6 million (2024)

Service provider
  - Electricity: Zamboanga del Norte Electric Cooperative (ZANECO)
  - Water: President Manuel A. Roxas Water District (PMARWD)
- Time zone: UTC+8 (PST)
- ZIP code: 7104
- PSGC: 0907211000
- IDD : area code: +63 (0)65
- Native languages: Subanon; Cebuano; Chavacano; Tagalog
- Website: presmanuelroxaszn.gov.ph

Roxas, officially the Municipality of President Manuel A. Roxas, is a municipality in the province of Zamboanga del Norte, Philippines. According to the 2024 census, it has a population of 38,649 people.

== History ==
The municipality of President Manuel A. Roxas was first created from the municipality of Katipunan in 1965 by President Diosdado Macapagal through Presidential Proclamation No. 177. However, its creation was questioned by Vice President Emmanuel Pelaez, and was later reverted by the Supreme Court of the Philippines as one of Katipunan's barangays.

On June 17, 1967, through the effort of Zamboanga del Norte Representative Alberto Q. Ubay, Republic Act No. 5077 was lapsed into law without President Ferdinand Marcos's signature, carving out President Manuel A. Roxas from Katipunan once more.

== Geography ==
=== Barangays ===
President Manuel A. Roxas is politically subdivided into 31 barangays. Each barangay consists of puroks while some have sitios.

- Balubo
- Banbanan
- Canibongan
- Capase
- Cape
- Denoman
- Dohinob
- Galokso
- Gubat
- Lower Irasan
- Labakid
- Langatian
- Lipakan
- Marupay
- Moliton
- Nabilid
- Panampalay
- Pangologon
- Piao
- Piñalan
- Piñamar
- Pongolan
- Salisig
- Sebod
- Sibatog
- Situbo
- Tanayan
- Tantingon
- Upper Irasan
- Upper Minang
- Villahermoso

=== Climate ===
Climate data for Roxas, Zamboanga del Norte
Month	Jan	Feb	Mar	Apr	May	Jun	Jul	Aug	Sep	Oct	Nov	Dec	Year
Mean daily maximum °C (°F)	29 (84)	29 (84)	30 (86)	31 (88)	30 (86)	30 (86)	29 (84)	30 (86)	30 (86)	29 (84)	29 (84)	29 (84)	30 (85)
Mean daily minimum °C (°F)	23 (73)	23 (73)	23 (73)	24 (75)	25 (77)	25 (77)	24 (75)	24 (75)	24 (75)	24 (75)	24 (75)	23 (73)	24 (75)
Average precipitation mm (inches)	104 (4.1)	76 (3.0)	92 (3.6)	97 (3.8)	199 (7.8)	238 (9.4)	195 (7.7)	193 (7.6)	178 (7.0)	212 (8.3)	171 (6.7)	110 (4.3)	1,865 (73.3)
Average rainy days	14.7	12.5	15.8	17.5	27.6	28.5	29.0	27.5	26.9	27.9	23.5	18.2	269.6
Source: Meteoblue

== Demographics ==
Population census of Roxas

Year	Pop.	±% p.a.
1970	18,851	—
1975	21,514	+2.69%
1980	24,222	+2.40%
1990	27,154	+1.15%
1995	31,662	+2.92%
2000	33,659	+1.32%

Year	Pop.	±% p.a.
2007	35,939	+0.91%
2010	37,611	+1.67%
2015	39,323	+0.85%
2020	39,198	−0.07%
2024	38,649	−0.34%

Source: Philippine Statistics Authority

== Economy ==
Poverty incidence of Roxas (%)

Source: Philippine Statistics Authority
