= Encho Serrano =

Filipino basketball player (born 1999)

No. 2 – Abra Weavers
- Position: Shooting guard
- League: MPBL

Personal information
- Born: September 18, 1999 (age 27)
- Listed height: 6 ft 0 in (1.83 m)

Career information
- High school: St. Vincent's (Apalit, Pampanga); Malayan (Manila); Adamson (Manila); LSGH (Mandaluyong)
- College: De La Salle
- PBA draft: 2022: 2nd round, 19th overall pick
- Drafted by: Phoenix Super LPG Fuel Masters

Career history
- 2020–2021: Pampanga Delta
- 2021: Basilan Jumbo Plastic
- 2022–2023: Phoenix Super LPG Fuel Masters
- 2023–2024: Pampanga Giant Lanterns
- 2025–present: Abra Solid North Weavers

Career highlights
- PBA All-Rookie Team (2023); 3× MPBL champion (2023–2025); MPBL All-Star (2023); 2× NBL–Pilipinas champion (2019–20 President's, 2021 Chairman's); NBL–Pilipinas Finals MVP (2021 Chairman's); Pilipinas Super League D2 Super Cup champion

Florencio "Encho" Caralde Serrano (born September 18, 1999) is a Filipino professional basketball player for the Abra Weavers of the Maharlika Pilipinas Basketball League (MPBL).

Serrano played for the Adamson Baby Falcons in high school, but was declared ineligible to play in 2017. Later that year, he transferred to the La Salle Green Hills Greenies before moving up to play for the De La Salle Green Archers in college in 2018, he would depart De La Salle in 2021.

In 2020, Serrano entered NBL–Pilipinas, playing for his hometown Pampanga Delta. In 2021, he played for the Basilan Jumbo Plastic in that year's MPBL Invitational. The following year, he moved to the PBA 3x3 playing for Barangay Ginebra San Miguel. He would go on to be selected by the Phoenix Super LPG Fuel Masters with the 19th pick of the PBA season 47 draft. Despite making the PBA All-Rookie Team with Phoenix, he would return to the MPBL in 2023, playing for the Pampanga Giant Lanterns. In 2025, he stepped out of his hometown team once again, playing for the Abra Weavers.

Serrano has won five championships in total, three in the MPBL and two in NBL–Pilipinas. He was also selected as an MPBL all-star in 2023. He also represented the Philippines at the FIBA 3x3 U18 World Cup in 2017.

== High school career and ineligibility issue ==
In UAAP Season 79, Serrano played for Adamson University's Baby Falcons. He was part of the roster that went 11–1 in the elimination round of the junior's basketball tournament. However, the team's season was put in jeopardy after Serrano was found to be ineligible to play for the team. UAAP eligibility committee chairman Rod Roque said in a statement that Serrano "failed to submit the required secondary student's permanent record", which essentially serves as proof of his high school records and credentials. The UAAP board ended up forfeiting the first twelve games the Baby Falcons took part in with Serrano, effectively putting them out of Final Four contention and ruling out Serrano for the MVP award.

According to Serrano, he first studied at St. Vincent's Academy in Apalit entering Grade 7, where he played for two seasons. He failed in his first year at St. Vincent's and dropped the following year. When he tried to acquire his transcripts from St. Vincent's, he was told by his father that it was misplaced. Thus when Serrano enrolled at Mapúa's Malayan High School of Science, he instead submitted his transcripts from Jose Escaler Elementary School, where he graduated grade 6. He also submitted those transcripts when he transferred from Adamson.

Serrano eventually finished his high school career with the La Salle Green Hills (LSGH) Greenies of the National Collegiate Athletic Association (NCAA) for Season 93. De La Salle University wanted to acquire Serrano for UAAP Season 81, and thus had him play at LSGH instead of De La Salle Zobel's (DLSZ) Junior Archers in part to circumvent the UAAP's residency rules.

== College career ==
Serrano made his debut for the De La Salle Green Archers in 2018 with UAAP Season 81. He also played in the PBA D-League during the 2020 Aspirants' Cup that was cut short due to the pandemic. He departed La Salle after UAAP Season 83 in 2021.

== Professional career ==
=== Pampanga Delta (2020–2021) ===
In 2020, Serrano began playing in the National Basketball League, joining the roster of the Pampanga Delta for the 2019–20 President's Cup of the homegrown league. At the time, NBL–Pilipinas was still considered an amateur league and Serrano was still with La Salle. When the league turned pro in August that year, Serrano didn't apply for a Special Guest License from the Games and Amusements Board. Thus, he didn't play in the Finals series against the La Union PAOwer, which the Delta ended up winning.

Serrano did end up returning to the team the following season, marking his professional debut. The Delta won back-to-back titles after a Finals rematch against La Union, with Serrano winning Finals MVP.

=== Basilan Jumbo Plastic (2021) ===
Staying in the grassroots, Serrano joined the Basilan Jumbo Plastic for the Maharlika Pilipinas Basketball League's 2021 Invitational tournament. He helped the team on their way to clinching the Invitational crown.

=== Phoenix Super LPG Fuel Masters (2022–2023) ===
On April 26, 2022, Encho Serrano declared for the PBA season 47 draft later that year. Serrano was declared the MVP of the draft combine and would go on to be selected by the Phoenix Super LPG Fuel Masters with the 19th overall pick. On May 25, 2022, he formally signed a one-year deal with Phoenix. Serrano averaged 10.3 points, 3.7 rebounds, and 1.9 assists per game, and was selected to the PBA All-Rookie Team.

=== Siomai King (2023) ===
For a brief period, Serrano played for the Siomai King team competing in the Pilipinas Super League's D2 Super Cup, winning the championship in the tournament.

=== Pampanga Giant Lanterns (2023–2024) ===
Following the 2022–23 PBA season, Serrano was offered a two-year deal with Phoenix, but declined the deal in favor of playing for another hometown team: the Pampanga Giant Lanterns of the MPBL. He was initially listed as part of the team's roster ahead of the 2023 MPBL season on April 10, but didn't make his debut until June 15. Serrano averaged 15.9 points, 3.8 rebounds, and 4.7 assists per game, on his way to being selected as an all-star for the 2023 MPBL All-Star Game and winning a championship with the team.

In his second season, Serrano continued to play a key role, averaging 12.7 points, 3.2 rebounds, and 3.1 assists per game. In game 1 of the 2024 MPBL finals against the Quezon Huskers, Serrano hit rookie L-Jay Gonzales to his jaw in the second quarter, leading him to be suspended for game 2. Despite that, it didn't slow down PGL's chances at clinching back-to-back titles, giving Serrano his fourth championship overall.

=== Abra Weavers (2025–present) ===
In January 2025, Serrano once again left his hometown team, this time signing with the Abra Weavers.

== 3x3 career ==
In 2017, Serrano represented the Philippines at the 2017 FIBA 3x3 U18 World Cup. On January 19, 2022, he signed with Barangay Ginebra San Miguel's 3x3 team in the PBA 3x3 league.

== Career statistics ==
=== PBA ===
Legend
GP	Games played	MPG	Minutes per game
FG%	Field-goal percentage	3P%	3-point field-goal percentage	FT%	Free-throw percentage
RPG	Rebounds per game	APG	Assists per game	SPG	Steals per game
BPG	Blocks per game	PPG	Points per game	**Bold**	Career high

==== Season-by-season averages ====
Year	Team	GP	MPG	FG%	3P%	FT%	RPG	APG	SPG	BPG	PPG
2022–23	Phoenix Super LPG	34	17.7	.474	.356	.657	3.7	1.9	.6	.1	10.3

=== MPBL ===
Legend
GP	Games played	GS	Games started	MPG	Minutes per game
FG%	Field-goal percentage	3P%	3-point field-goal percentage	FT%	Free-throw percentage
RPG	Rebounds per game	APG	Assists per game	SPG	Steals per game
BPG	Blocks per game	PPG	Points per game	**Bold**	Career high

==== Season-by-season averages ====
Year	Team	GP	GS	MPG	FG%	3P%	FT%	RPG	APG	SPG	BPG	PPG
2023	Pampanga	23	9	**23.3**	**.424**	**.295**	.635	**3.8**	**4.7**	**.9**	—	**15.9**
2024	Pampanga	**31**	**10**	20.6	.401	.274	**.725**	3.2	3.1	.6	**.2**	12.7
2025	Abra	**35**	**5**	18.1	.412	.283	**.739**	3.4	2.5	.7	**.5**	12.5
