= Khate Castillo =

Filipino basketball player

No. 7 – Batangas New Zealand Bluefire
- Position: Shooting guard
- League: WMPBL

Personal information
- Born: October 5, 1996 (age 30)
- Listed height: 5 ft 4 in (1.62 m)

Career information
- College: De La Salle

Career history
- 2019: Parañaque Lady Aces
- 2021: Glutagence Glow Boosters
- 2025–present: Batanagas New Zealand Bluefire

Ana Alicia Hatrina "Khate" I. Castillo (born October 5, 1996) is a Filipina basketball player for the Batangas New Zealand Bluefire of the Women's Maharlika Pilipinas Basketball League (WMPBL).

== Education ==
Khate Castillo attended the De La Salle University where she graduated with a degree in sports studies.

== Career ==
=== College ===
Castillo played for the DLSU Lady Archers under coach Cholo Villanueva. It was in 2013, when Castillo first became teammates with Camille Claro with the two becoming known as the "Splash Sisters". In UAAP Season 79, the pair helped La Salle reach the finals after a three year absence.

=== Club ===
==== Parañaque Lady Aces ====
In 2019, Castillo along with Claro played for the Parañaque Lady Aces of the Women's National Basketball League of the Philippines (WNBL–Philippines).

==== Glutagence Glow Boosters ====
WNBL professionalized, and Castillo entered the 2021 draft Castillo was third overall-pick by the Glutagence Glow Boosters. Her teammate, Claro was selected as well by Glutagence.

Glutagence advanced to the semifinals of the 2021 WNBL season. However, they were disqualified by the league after the team owners failed to pay the franchise fee.

==== New Zealand Bluefire Valkyries ====
Castillo joined the New Zealand Bluefire Valkyries of the Women's Maharlika Pilipinas Basketball League (WMPBL), debuting at the 2025 Invitational Tournament. She remained with the Valkyries when they entered the inaugural 2025 regular season, now representing the province of Batangas.

=== National team ===
Khate Claro has played for the Philippine national team. She played in the 2019, 2021 and 2023 editions of the FIBA Women's Asia Cup.

Castillo was also part of the squad which won the Philippines' first ever women's basketball gold at the 2019 SEA Games. Castillo is still part of the team which defended the title at the 2021 SEA Games. In the 2023 SEA Games, the team finished second.
