= PBA draft combine =

Basketball pre-draft event

The PBA draft combine is an annual two-day event before the PBA draft. At the combine, rookie prospects undergo biometrics and perform various athletic tests and shooting drills. Then they are divided into teams and play 5-on-5 against each other in a mini-tournament. At the end of the tournament, an MVP and the Mythical Five are named. Beginning in the Season 47 draft, rookies are also oriented on the Uniform Players Contract (UPC) during the combine. An athlete's performance during the combine can affect perception, draft status, and ultimately the player's career.

The athletic tests include both standing and running vertical jumps, three-quarter-court sprint time, reaction time, and lane agility time. Previously, other physical tests included bench presses, push ups, sit ups, and pull ups. Physical measurements include height, weight, reach, and wingspan.

Attendance is mandatory for all rookie prospects, with those who didn't attend removed from the list of eligible participants. However, those who have played for the Philippine national team are no longer required to participate, with an example being Javi Gómez de Liaño in the Season 47 draft. Players may be excused if they are in another country, are playing for another team at the moment, or are injured, provided they inform the league ahead of time.

The league previously held a rookie camp, a practice that began in 2003. From 2012 to 2013, no scrimmages were held as only biometrics were taken. In 2014, it was rebranded as the PBA draft combine, with scrimmages held once again. In 2021, the draft combine was cancelled due to COVID-19 safety reasons. It was brought back a year later.

== Awards ==
=== Draft combine MVPs ===
Draft	Player	School / club team	Ref.
2016	Jio Jalalon	Arellano / Caida Tile Masters	
2017	Kiefer Ravena	Ateneo	
2018	JP Calvo	Letran / Wang's Basketball Couriers	
2019	Roosevelt Adams	College of Idaho / Go for Gold Scratchers	
Season 46	Cancelled due to the COVID-19 pandemic		
Season 47	Encho Serrano	De La Salle / Pampanga (NBL) / Basilan (MPBL)	
Season 48	Archie Concepcion	Arellano / Pampanga G Lanterns (MPBL)	
Season 49	Jonnel Policarpio	De La Salle	
Season 50	Sonny Estil	Letran / Pampanga Giant Lanterns (MPBL)	

=== Draft combine Mythical Five ===
Seasons	Players	School / Club Team
2015	Norbert Torres	De La Salle / Cebuana Lhuillier Gems
2015	Glenn Khobuntin	NU / Jumbo Plastic Linoleum Giants
2015	Kevin Racal	Letran / Hog's Breath Cafe Razorbacks
2015	Michael Mabulac	JRU / Cagayan Rising Suns
2015	Mike DiGregorio	McKendree / Keramix Mixers
2016	Jio Jalalon	Arellano / Caida Tile Masters
2016	Mike Tolomia	FEU / Phoenix Accelerators
2016	Jammer Jamito	St. Clare / AMA Online Education Titans
2016	Joseph Eriobu	Mapúa / Caida Tile Masters
2016	Reden Celda	NU / Tanduay Light Rhum Masters
2017	Kiefer Ravena	Ateneo
2017	Raymar Jose	FEU / Cignal HD - San Beda
2017	Jason Perkins	De La Salle / Caida Tile Masters
2017	Jeron Teng	De La Salle / Flying V Thunder
2017	Robbie Herndon	San Francisco State / Marinerong Pilipino Skippers
2018	JP Calvo	Letran / Wang's Basketball Couriers
2018	Robert Bolick	San Beda / Cignal HD - San Beda
2018	Javee Mocon	San Beda / Cignal HD - San Beda
2018	Michael Calisaan	San Sebastian / Che'Lu Bar and Grill - SSC-R
2018	C. J. Isit	Mapúa / Batangas-EAC
2019	Roosevelt Adams	College of Idaho / Go for Gold Scratchers
2019	Rey Suerte	UE / Che'Lu Bar & Grill Revellers
2019	Mike Ayonayon	Philippine Christian / Marinerong Pilipino Skippers
2019	Rey Publico	Letran / Go for Gold Scratchers
2019	Chris Bitoon	St. Clare / Go for Gold Scratchers
2020	No draft	
Season 46	Cancelled due to the COVID-19 pandemic	
Season 47	Encho Serrano	De La Salle / Pampanga (NBL) / Basilan (MPBL)
Season 47	Kurt Lojera	De La Salle
Season 47	Shaun Ildefonso	NU
Season 47	Ato Ular	Letran / Marikina Shoemasters (MPBL)
Season 47	Jay-R Dela Rosa	AMA University
Season 48	Archie Concepcion	Arellano / Pampanga G Lanterns (MPBL)
Season 48	Ralph Cu	De La Salle
Season 48	Adrian Nocum	Mapúa / San Juan Knights (MPBL)
Season 48	Jayson Apolonio	Letran / Pampanga G Lanterns (MPBL)
Season 48	Warren Bonifacio	Mapúa
Season 49	Jonnel Policarpio	De La Salle
Season 49	Justine Baltazar	De La Salle / Pampanga Giant Lanterns (MPBL)
Season 49	Brandon Ramirez	York / Pampanga Giant Lanterns (MPBL)
Season 49	Kurt Reyson	Letran / Pampanga Giant Lanterns (MPBL)
Season 49	Jordan Bartlett	De La Salle
Season 50	Sonny Estil	Letran / Pampanga Giant Lanterns (MPBL)
Season 50	Dalph Panopio	Cal State Baskersfield / Mumbai Titans (India)
Season 50	Edrian Ramirez	Immaculate Concepcion / Bataan Risers (MPBL)
Season 50	Jun Roque	Letran
Season 50	Mario Barasi	Adamson / Basilan Starhorse (MPBL)
