= PBA season 47 draft =

Player selection in Philippine basketball

General information
- Date: May 15, 2022
- Location: Robinsons Place Manila
- Networks: One Sports (TV5, PBA Rush)

Overview
- League: Philippine Basketball Association
- First selection: Brandon Ganuelas-Rosser (Blackwater Bossing)

The PBA season 47 draft was the 37th edition of the PBA draft. The event allowed teams to take turns selecting amateur basketball players and other eligible players, including half-Filipino foreign players. The league determined the drafting order based on the performance of the member teams from the 2021 season, with the worst team picking first.

== Draft order ==
In past drafts until 2019, the draft order was determined based on the team's overall performance from the previous season. The Philippine Cup final ranking comprised 40% of the points, while the Commissioner's and Governors' Cup rankings were 30% each.

Since the league only held two tournaments for the 2021 season, only the final rankings of the Philippine Cup (60%) and Governors' Cup (40%) were used to determine the draft order.

Draft order	Team	Final ranking		Total
Draft order	Team	PHI	GOV	Total
1st	Blackwater Bossing	12th	12th	12.0
2nd	Terrafirma Dyip	10th	11th	10.4
3rd	Converge FiberXers*	11th	7th	9.4
4th	Phoenix Super LPG Fuel Masters	9th	8th	8.6
5th	Rain or Shine Elasto Painters	6th	10th	7.6
6th	NorthPort Batang Pier	5th	9th	6.6
7th	NLEX Road Warriors	7th	4th	5.8
8th	Barangay Ginebra San Miguel	8th	1st	5.2
9th	San Miguel Beermen	4th	6th	4.8
10th	Meralco Bolts	3rd	2nd	2.6
11th	TNT Tropang Giga	1st	5th	2.6
12th	Magnolia Chicken Timplados Hotshots	2nd	3rd	2.4

- Converge's previous franchisee competed as the Alaska Aces during the 2021 season.

== Draft selections ==
PG	Point guard	SG	Shooting guard	SF	Small forward	PF	Power forward	C	Center	*	Mythical team member	^{#}	All-Star

=== 1st round ===
Pick	Player	Pos.	Country of birth	Team	School / club team
1	Brandon Ganuelas-Rosser	C/PF	United States	Blackwater Bossing	UC Riverside
2	Jeremiah Gray^{#}	SF	United States	Terrafirma Dyip	Dominican/San Miguel Alab Pilipinas (ABL)
3	Jeo Ambohot	C/PF	Philippines	Converge FiberXers	Letran
4	Justin Arana^{#}	C	Philippines	Converge FiberXers (from Phoenix) (Note: February 23, 2021: Phoenix to Converge (Alaska): Alaska acquired Brian Heruela, Magnolia's 2020 first and second round picks, and a 2021 first round pick; Phoenix acquired Vic Manuel, 2020 first and second round picks)	Arellano
5	Gian Mamuyac^{#}	SG	Philippines	Rain or Shine Elasto Painters	Ateneo
6	JM Calma	C	Philippines	NorthPort Batang Pier	San Sebastian
7	Tyrus Hill	PF	United States	NLEX Road Warriors	De La Salle
8	Javi Gómez de Liaño	SF	Philippines	Barangay Ginebra San Miguel	UP Diliman/Ibaraki Robots (Japan)
9	Kurt Lojera	SG	Philippines	Blackwater Bossing (from San Miguel via TNT) (Note: December 3, 2019: TNT to Blackwater: Blackwater acquired Don Trollano, Anthony Semerad, and San Miguel's 2021 first round pick; TNT acquired Bobby Ray Parks Jr.; December 19, 2018: San Miguel to TNT: TNT acquired Brian Heruela, David Semerad, and a 2021 first round pick; San Miguel acquired Terrence Romeo)	De La Salle
10	Shaun Ildefonso	SF/SG	Philippines	Rain or Shine Elasto Painters (from Meralco) (Note: May 13, 2019: Meralco to Rain or Shine: Rain or Shine acquired 2019 and 2021 first round picks; Meralco acquired Raymond Almazan)	NU
11	Mark Dyke	SF	Philippines	Blackwater Bossing (from TNT) (Note: February 28, 2020: TNT to Blackwater (three-team trade with NLEX): Blackwater acquired Marion Magat, Yousef Taha, Ed Daquioag, 2021 and 2022 first round picks from TNT; NLEX acquired Anthony Semerad, Rabeh Al-Hussaini, 2020 first round pick, and San Miguel's 2021 second round pick from Blackwater; TNT acquired Poy Erram from Blackwater via NLEX)	De La Salle/Manila Stars (MPBL)
12	Keith Zaldivar	C	Philippines	Magnolia Chicken Timplados Hotshots	Adamson

=== 2nd round ===
Pick	Player	Pos.	Country of birth	Team	School / club team
13	Ato Ular	PF	Philippines	Blackwater Bossing	Letran/Marikina Shoemasters (MPBL)
14	Tyler Tio^{#}	PG	Philippines	Phoenix Super LPG Fuel Masters (from Terrafirma) (Note: December 5, 2017: Terrafirma (Kia) to Phoenix: Phoenix acquired a 2021 second round pick; Kia acquired Jon Jon Gabriel)	Ateneo
15	Kameron Vales	PG	United States	Converge FiberXers	Regina
16	Chris Lalata	C/PF	Philippines	Phoenix Super LPG Fuel Masters	Olivarez
17	Jhonard Clarito	SF/SG	Philippines	Rain or Shine Elasto Painters	De Ocampo/San Juan Knights (MPBL)
18	RJ Ramirez	SG	Canada	Rain or Shine Elasto Painters (from NorthPort via TNT) (Note: January 14, 2020: TNT to Rain or Shine: Rain or Shine acquired a 2020 second round pick, NorthPort's 2021 second round pick, and San Miguel's 2022 second round pick; TNT acquired Ed Daquioag; June 10, 2019: NorthPort to TNT (three-team trade with NLEX): NorthPort acquired Terrafirma's (Columbian's) 2020 second round pick and Phoenix's 2019 second round pick that was not conveyed, from NLEX; and Michael Miranda from TNT; NLEX acquired Jericho Cruz from TNT and San Miguel's 2020 second round pick from NorthPort; TNT acquired Marion Magat from NLEX; 2021 and 2022 second round picks from NorthPort)	FEU/Bacoor City Strikers (MPBL)
19	Encho Serrano	SG/PG	Philippines	Phoenix Super LPG Fuel Masters (from NLEX) (Note: February 24, 2022: NLEX to Phoenix: Phoenix acquired Kris Porter, 2021 second round and 2022 first round picks; NLEX acquired Justin Chua)	De La Salle/Pampanga (NBL)/Basilan (MPBL)
20	Jayson David	SF/SG	Philippines	Barangay Ginebra San Miguel	Lyceum
21	Chester Saldua	PF	United States	NLEX Road Warriors (from San Miguel via Blackwater) (Note: February 28, 2020: Blackwater to NLEX (three-team trade with TNT): See TNT to Blackwater; December 19, 2018: San Miguel to Blackwater: Blackwater acquired 2021 and 2022 second round picks; San Miguel acquired Paul Zamar)	PCU
22	Christian Fajarito	C	Philippines	Meralco Bolts	Letran
23	Enzo Joson	PG	Philippines	Phoenix Super LPG Fuel Masters (from TNT via NorthPort) (Note: November 5, 2021: NorthPort to Phoenix: Phoenix acquired Sean Anthony, Sean Manganti, and TNT's 2021 second round pick; NorthPort acquired Michael Calisaan and Vic Manuel; April 3, 2018: TNT to NorthPort (GlobalPort): GlobalPort acquired Mo Tautuaa, 2020 first round and 2021 second round picks; TNT acquired Terrence Romeo and Yousef Taha)	NU
24	Carlo de Chavez	PF	United States	Magnolia Chicken Timplados Hotshots	Bloomfield

=== 3rd round ===
Pick	Player	Pos.	Country of birth	Team	School / club team
25	Daryl Pascual	C	Philippines	Blackwater Bossing	Letran
26	Allen Mina	SF/SG	Philippines	Terrafirma Dyip	Letran
27	Jollo Go	SG	Philippines	Converge FiberXers	De La Salle/Manila Stars (MPBL)
28	Alvin Baetiong	C	Philippines	Phoenix Super LPG Fuel Masters	San Sebastian
29	Rhaffy Octobre	PF	Philippines	Rain or Shine Elasto Painters	UV
30	John Apacible	PF	Philippines	NorthPort Batang Pier	UE
31	Levi dela Cruz	PG	Philippines	NLEX Road Warriors	Arellano
32	Rence Alcoriza	SG	Philippines	Barangay Ginebra San Miguel	Arellano
33	Jerwyn Guinto	PF	Australia	San Miguel Beermen	Lyceum
34	JJ Espanola	SG	Philippines	Meralco Bolts	UP Diliman
35	Roberto Bartolo	C	Philippines	TNT Tropang Giga	Benilde
36	Orlan Wamar	PG	Philippines	Magnolia Chicken Timplados Hotshots	Centro Escolar

=== 4th round ===
Pick	Player	Pos.	Country of birth	Team	School / club team
37	Earvin Lacsamana	C	Canada	Blackwater Bossing	Champlain
38	Shaq Alanes	PG	Philippines	Terrafirma Dyip	Lyceum
39	Leonard Esguerra	C	Philippines	Phoenix Super LPG Fuel Masters	José Rizal
40	JJ Caspe	PG	Philippines	NorthPort Batang Pier	Batangas
41	Lyndon Colina	PG/SG	Philippines	San Miguel Beermen	USPF
42	Andrey Armenion	PG	Philippines	Meralco Bolts	UE
43	John Villanueva	SG	Philippines	TNT Tropang Giga	Perpetual Help
44	Garciano Puerto	SF	Philippines	Magnolia Chicken Timplados Hotshots	UC

- Converge, Rain or Shine, NLEX, and Barangay Ginebra passed during the round.

=== 5th round ===
Pick	Player	Pos.	Country of birth	Team	School / club team
45	Arthur Navasero	SF	Philippines	Blackwater Bossing	Centennial
46	Sandy Ceñal	SF	Philippines	Terrafirma Dyip	RTU/Bicol Volcanoes (MPBL)
47	Niño Ibañez	PG	Philippines	Phoenix Super LPG Fuel Masters	Lyceum
48	Yves Sason	SG/PG	Philippines	NorthPort Batang Pier	PCU
49	John Gonzaga	PG	Philippines	San Miguel Beermen	San Sebastian

- Meralco, TNT, and Magnolia passed during the round.

=== 6th round ===
Pick	Player	Pos.	Country of birth	Team	School / club team
50	Red Cachuela	PF	Philippines	Terrafirma Dyip	Southwestern/KCS Mandaue (VisMin)
51	Nichole John Ubalde	SG/SF	Philippines	Phoenix Super LPG Fuel Masters	USTSP
52	CJ Cadua	PG	United States	San Miguel Beermen	EAC

- Blackwater and NorthPort passed during the round.

=== 7th round ===
A seventh round was held, but all remaining teams passed, thus ending the draft.

== Trades involving draft picks ==
NOTE: Due to the postponement of the PBA season 46 draft, all draft picks from 2020 onwards are executed one year later.

=== Pre-draft trades ===
Prior to the day of the draft, the following trades were made and resulted in exchanges of picks between the teams. Converge retained the rights to Alaska's draft picks.

== Notable undrafted player ==
Name	Country of birth	College	Notes
Jason Opiso	Philippines	CEU	

== Combine ==
The PBA draft combine for this edition of the draft was held from May 11 to 12 at the Gatorade Hoops Center in Mandaluyong. Encho Serrano was named the draft combine MVP as his team won the mini-tournament, and he, Shaun Ildefonso, Kurt Lojera, Ato UIar, and JayR Dela Cruz were named to the Mythical Five.

== Eligibility and entrants ==
Applications for the draft began on March 21. Although the deadline was initially on May 2, it was moved to May 7. For this year, UAAP seniors were allowed to declare for the draft, since the draft took place after the UAAP season. From 76 initial applicants, the final tally was brought down to 66 as several players withdrew their applications or had insufficient documents.

The following were the eligibility requirements for local players:

- Entrants of at least 22 years of age on the day of the draft must be four years removed from high school or have played one year of college basketball;
- Entrants between 19 and 21 years of age must have had at least two years of college education.

Eligibility requirements for Filipino-foreigner entrants are similar to the locals but with some additions:

- All Filipino-foreigner entrants must be a holder of a Philippine passport;
- All Filipino-foreigner entrants must have previously played professional basketball elsewhere and is not under contract with other teams
- Must not be over the age of 30 years old.

=== Notable entrants ===
==== Domestic league players ====
In this section, only entrants who have played for a UAAP, NCAA, CESAFI, UCAL, NCRAA, NAASCU or U.S. NCAA school are included. Additionally, all listed entrants have played in the Maharlika Pilipinas Basketball League prior to the draft unless specified.

- Shaq Alanes – G, Lyceum / MACFI Basilan Golden Lions (VisMin)
- Rence Alcoriza – G, Arellano / AFP-FSD Makati Cavaliers (FilBasket)
- John Apacible – F, UE / Pagadian Explorers (PSL)
- Jeferson Arceo – G, AMA / AMA Online Education Titans (FilBasket)
- Andrey Armenion – G, UE / Valenzuela MJAS Zenith
- Alvin Baetiong – C, San Sebastian / Mindoro Tamaraws
- Roberto Bartolo – C, Benilde / Pasay Voyagers
- Keanu Caballero – G, CEU / Taguig Generals (NBL)
- JJ Caspe – G, Batangas / Mindoro Tamaraws (NBL)
- Fidel Castro – G, PCU / Taguig Generals (NBL)
- Sandy Ceñal – F, RTU / CPG–Bohol Pure Mineral Water Dolphins (VisMin)
- Jhonard Clarito – F/G / De Ocampo / San Juan Knights
- Levi Dela Cruz – G, Arellano / Roxas Vanguards (PSL)
- Jay-R Dela Rosa – G, AMA / AMA Online Education Titans (FilBasket)
- Mark Dyke – F, De La Salle / Pampanga Delta (NBL)
- Leonard Esguerra – C, JRU / Caloocan Excellence
- JJ Espanola – G, UP / Marikina Shoe City
- Alvin Fuentes – G, AMA / AMA Online Education Titans (FilBasket)
- John Gonzaga – G, San Sebastian / Pagadian Explorers (PSL)
- Earvin Lacsamana – C, Champlain / Makati Super Crunch
- Chris Lalata – C/F, Olivarez / Davao Occidental Tigers
- Danny Marilao – F, CDSL / Caloocan Excellence
- Brylle Meca – G, Arellano / Valenzuela MJAS Zenith
- Arthur Navasero – F, Centennial / Manila Stars
- Rhaffy Octobre – F, UV / Basilan Peace Riders (PSL)
- Jason Opiso – F, CEU / Pagadian Explorers (PSL)
- Daryl Pascual – C, Letran / Marikina Shoe City
- Graciano Puerto – F, UC / Max4-Birada Cebu (Chooks3x3)
- RJ Ramirez – G, FEU / GenSan Warriors
- Chester Saldua – F, PCU / Davao Occidental Tigers
- Yves Sason – G, PCU / Marikina Shoe City
- Nichole John Ubalde – G/F, USTSP / Cebu Casino Ethyl Alcohol
- Ato Ular – F, Letran / Marikina Shoe City
- John Villanueva – G, Perpetual Help / Batangas City Embassy Chill
- Orlan Wamar – G, CEU / San Juan Knights

==== International league players ====
- Brandon Ganuelas-Rosser – C/F, UC Riverside / San Miguel Alab Pilipinas (Southeast Asia)
- Arvin Gomez – G, UC / Boleraus (Australian Chinese Basketball Association)
- Javi Gómez de Liaño – F, UP / Ibaraki Robots (Japan)

==== PBA 3x3 and PBA D-League players ====
- Red Cachuela – F, Southwestern / Terrafirma 3x3
- Carlo de Chavez – F, Bloomfield / Pioneer Pro Tibay
- Jayson David – F/G, Lyceum / Barangay Ginebra San Miguel
- Jollo Go – G, De La Salle / Barangay Ginebra San Miguel
- Jeremiah Gray – F, Dominican / TNT Tropang Giga 3x3
- Encho Serrano – G, De La Salle / Barangay Ginebra San Miguel
- Kyle Toth – G, Cal Poly / Marinerong Pilipino Skippers

==== UAAP and NCAA players ====
- Jeo Ambohot – C/F, Letran
- Justin Arana – C, Arellano
- CJ Cadua – G, EAC
- JM Calma – C, San Sebastian
- Christian Fajarito – C, Letran
- Enzo Joson – G, NU
- Allen Mina – F/G, Letran
- Jerwyn Guinto – F, Lyceum
- Tyrus Hill – F, De La Salle
- Niño Ibañez – G, Lyceum
- Shaun Ildefonso – F/G, NU
- Gian Mamuyac – G, Ateneo
- Kurt Lojera – G, De La Salle
- Marwin Taywan – G, EAC
- Tyler Tio – G, Ateneo
- Keith Zaldivar – C, Adamson

==== Players from other collegiate leagues ====
- Lyndon Colina – G, USPF (CESAFI)
- Kameron Vales – G, Regina (U Sports)
