= Raiza Palmera-Dy =

Filipino basketball player

Akari Sparks
- Position: Assistant coach
- League: WMPBL

Personal information
- Born: November 21, 1990 (age 35)
- Listed height: 5 ft 6 in (1.68 m)

Career information
- College: FEU (2008–2011)
- Playing career: 2021–present

Career history

Playing
- 2021: Glutagence Glow Boosters
- 2026–present: Akari Sparks

Coaching
- 2024–2025: FEU (women)
- 2025: Discovery Perlas
- 2026–present: Akari Sparks (assistant)
- 2026–present: Philippines (women) (assistant)

Career highlights
- 2x UAAP champion (2008, 2011); UAAP Season MVP (2011); WNBL Rookie of the Year (2021)
Medals
Representing Philippines
Women's basketball
SEABA Championship
| Gold medal – first place | 2016 Malacca City | Team |

Raiza Rose Palmera-Dy (born November 21, 1990) is a basketball player and coach.

== Playing career ==
=== Collegiate ===
Palmera played for the Far Eastern University (FEU) Lady Tamaraws basketball team at the University Athletic Association of the Philippines (UAAP) with Allana Lim. She won the Season 71 and 74 women's basketball titles. She was named Season MVP for Season 74. Palmera went on a hiatus on basketball after playing for FEU.

=== Club ===
Palmera-Dy started playing club basketball when she was drafted to the Glutagence Glow Boosters of the Women's National Basketball League for the 2021 season. Glutagence advance to the semifinals but was disbanded due to financial issues. Despite the team's withdrawal she was named Rookie of the Year.

=== National team ===
Palmera-Dy earned a placed in the Philippines women's national team in 2015 despite having given birth to an eight month old. She played in the 2015 FIBA Asia Women's Championship, the 2016 SEABA Championship for Women and the 2015 and 2017 SEA Games. She played in the 2017 FIBA Women's Asia Cup

She has also played for the youth team suiting for her country at the Level II of the 2008 FIBA Asia Under-18 Championship for Women.

== Coaching career ==
Palmera-Dy became head coach of the FEU Lady Tamaraws starting the UAAP Season 87.

Discovery Perlas of the Women's Maharlika Pilipinas Basketball League has Palmera-Dy as their coach for the inaugural 2025 season.

== Personal life ==
Palmera-Dy has three children with the most recent born in 2020. She married William Dy sometime after graduating from college. She has familial roots to Isabela.
