= 2021 WNBL–Philippines season =

- League: Women's National Basketball League (WNBL)
- Sport: Basketball
- Duration: July 18 – 25, 2021 (before suspension); September 18 – December 5, 2021 (resumption)
- Number of teams: 5

2021 WNBL–Philippines draft
- Top draft pick: Fille Claudine Cainglet
- Picked by: Glutagence Glow Boosters

2021 WNBL–Philippines season
- Season champions: Parañaque Lady Aces (1st title)
- Runners-up: Taguig Lady Generals
- Season MVP: Allana Lim (Parañaque)

2021 WNBL–Philippines Finals
- Finals MVP: Angeli Jo Gloriani (Parañaque)

Seasons
- ← 2019 2022 →

The 2021 WNBL–Pilipinas season, also known as the 2021 Pia Cayetano WNBL season, is the second season of the Women's National Basketball League (WNBL) of the Philippines. It is also the first season of the WNBL as a professional league as recognized by the Games and Amusement Board of the Philippine government. The season started on July 18, 2021.

On July 29, the league announced through their Facebook page that the games were postponed due to the implementation of the highest quarantine restriction (Enhanced Community Quarantine) in Metro Manila beginning on August 6. The season resumed on September 18 after quarantine restrictions in Metro Manila eased up.

== Teams ==
A total of five teams confirmed participation for the 2021 season 17 teams applied to join the inaugural season of the WNBL as a professional league which were screened mainly on their financial capability. Only four teams were accepted as participants for the inaugural professional season, with one more team joining the WNBL only after the conclusion of the 2021 draft, the Taguig Lady Generals.

Team
Parañaque Lady Aces
Pacific Water Queens
Glutagence Glow Boosters
Quezon Lady Spartan
Taguig Lady Generals

== Venue ==
Due to the COVID-19 pandemic in Metro Manila, the season was played in Bren Z. Guiao Convention Center in Pampanga, in a closed-circuit format, behind closed doors.

San Fernando, Pampanga	2021 WNBL–Philippines season is located in Luzon
Bren Z. Guiao Convention Center	2021 WNBL–Philippines season is located in Luzon

== Format ==
The following format will be observed for the duration of the season:

- Double-round robin eliminations; 10 games per team; Teams are then seeded by basis on win–loss records.
- Top four teams will advance to the semifinals.
- Semifinals:
  - SF1: #1 vs #4 (best-of-three)
  - SF2: #2 vs #3 (best-of-three)
- Finals (best-of-3 series)
  - F1: SF1 Winner vs SF2 Winner

== Elimination round ==
=== Team standings ===
Pos	Team	W	L	PCT	GB	Qualification
1	Parañaque Lady Aces	8	0	1.000	—	Best-of-three semifinals
2	Taguig Lady Generals	4	4	.500 (Note: Head-to-head quotient: Taguig 1.09483, Glutagence 0.91339)	4	Best-of-three semifinals
3	Glutagence Glow Boosters	4	4	.500	4	Best-of-three semifinals
4	Quezon Lady Spartan	2	6	.250 (Note: Head-to-head quotient: Quezon 1.03846, Pacific Water 0.96296)	6	Best-of-three semifinals
5	Pacific Water Queens	2	6	.250	6	

Updated to match(es) played on November 7, 2021. Source: WNBL stats website

=== Schedule ===
	Round 1				Round 2			
Team ╲ Game	1	2	3	4	5	6	7	8
Glutagence Glow Boosters	PWQ	QLS	PLA	TLG	QLS	PWQ	TLG	PLA
Pacific Water Queens	GGB	PLA	TLG	QLS	GGB	PLA	TLG	QLS
Parañaque Lady Aces	PWQ	TLG	GGB	QLS	PWQ	TLG	QLS	GGB
Quezon Lady Spartan	GGB	TLG	PWQ	PLA	GGB	PWQ	PLA	TLG
Taguig Lady Generals	PWQ	PLA	QLS	GGB	PWQ	PLA	GGB	QLS

Updated to match(es) played on November 7, 2021. Source: WNBL stats website
= Win; = OT win; = Loss; = OT loss

=== Results ===
Teams	GGB	PWQ	PLA	QLS	TLG
Glutagence Glow Boosters	—	72–55	67–76	59–50	65–59
Pacific Water Queens	71–61	—	56–85	54–69	42–60
Parañaque Lady Aces	68–52	76–35	—	68–48	58–37
Quezon Lady Spartan	60–75	66–76	49–69	—	50–58
Taguig Lady Generals	68–51	43–34	49–63	59–72	—

Updated to match(es) played on November 7, 2021. Source: WNBL stats website
Legend: Blue = left column team win; Red = top row team win.
Matches with lighter background shading were decided after overtime.

== Playoffs ==
Semifinals
1	Parañaque	2
4	Quezon	0
2	Taguig	2
3	Glutagence	1

Finals
1	Parañaque	2
2	Taguig	0

=== Semifinals ===
==== (1) Parañaque vs. (4) Quezon ====
Solar Sports

November 13, 2021
11:15am

box score

Parañaque Lady Aces 98, Quezon Lady Spartan 56
Scoring by quarter: 30–8, 20–16, 23–16, 25–16
Pts: Lim 21; Rebs: three players 7 Asts: Angeles 7	Pts: Faraon 13; Rebs: Faraon 8 Asts: three players 2

Bren Z. Guiao Convention Center, San Fernando, Pampanga
Referees: K. Vergara, A. Buenaventura, J. Buce, J. Tajona

Solar Sports

November 14, 2021
2:00pm

box score

Parañaque Lady Aces 85, Quezon Lady Spartan 53
Scoring by quarter: 23–15, 21–8, 19–17, 22–13
Pts: Castro 12; Rebs: Lim 13; Asts: Lim 7	Pts: Nadres 10; Rebs: Faraon 10; Asts: Araja 4
Lady Aces wins series, 2–0

Bren Z. Guiao Convention Center, San Fernando, Pampanga
Referees: M. Mesias, R. Francisco, J. Tarona, J. Buce

==== (2) Taguig vs (3) Glutagence ====
Solar Sports

November 13, 2021
1:15pm

box score

Taguig Lady Generals 53, Glutagence Glow Boosters 62
Scoring by quarter: 9–16, 9–15, 20–10, 15–21
Pts: Capilit 15; Rebs: Duazo 9 Asts: Duazo 4	Pts: Palmera-Dy 20; Rebs: Lualhati 12; Asts: Palmera-Dy 6

Bren Z. Guiao Convention Center, San Fernando, Pampanga
Referees: C. Tungol, M. Mesias, J. Tajona, J. Vipinoso

Solar Sports

November 14, 2021
12:00pm

box score

Taguig Lady Generals 63, Glutagence Glow Boosters 32
Scoring by quarter: 14–6, 19–3, 14–15, 16–8
Pts: Sison 12; Rebs: Duazo 9 Asts: three players 3	Pts: Palmera-Dy 17; Rebs: Palmera-Dy 11; Asts: Palmera-Dy 3
Series tied, 1–1

Bren Z. Guiao Convention Center, San Fernando, Pampanga

Solar Sports

Taguig Lady Generals 20, Glutagence Glow Boosters 0 (forfeit)
Taguig wins series, 2-1

Bren Z. Guiao Convention Center, San Fernando, Pampanga

Glutagence have forfeited Game 3 of their semifinals series against Taguig after the league have decided to terminate the Glow Boosters' franchise for failure to settle their franchise fee.

=== Finals ===
==== (1) Parañaque vs (2) Taguig ====
Solar Sports

December 4
3:00pm

box score

Parañaque Lady Aces 60, Taguig Lady Generals 53
Scoring by quarter: 19–2, 16–10, 18–17, 7–24
Pts: Lim 15; Rebs: Lim 14; Asts: Angeles 9	Pts: Bacaro 17; Rebs: Duazo 8 Asts: Bacaro 3

Bren Z. Guiao Convention Center, San Fernando, Pampanga
Referees: J. Buce, J. Tajona, F. Sta. Ana, J. Mabandos

Solar Sports

December 5
3:00pm

box score

Parañaque Lady Aces 83, Taguig Lady Generals 78
Scoring by quarter: 15–14, 19–22, 23–19, 26–23
Pts: Lim 30; Rebs: Lim, Castro 9 Asts: Angeles 6	Pts: Bacaro 23; Rebs: Sison 10; Asts: Del Carmen 5
Parañaque wins series, 2–0

Bren Z. Guiao Convention Center, San Fernando, Pampanga
Referees: R. Francisco, J. Tajona, J. Mabandos, M. Escalambre

== See also ==
- 2021 NBL–Philippines season
