= Jonnel Policarpio =

Filipino basketball player (born 2001)

No. 16 – Converge FiberXers
- Position: Power forward / small forward
- League: PBA

Personal information
- Born: December 16, 2001 (age 24) Arayat, Pampanga, Philippines
- Listed height: 6 ft 5 in (1.96 m)

Career information
- High school: Malayan (Manila)
- College: De La Salle (2023)
- PBA draft: 2024: 1st round, 6th overall pick
- Drafted by: NLEX Road Warriors
- Playing career: 2024–present

Career history
- 2024–2025: NLEX Road Warriors
- 2026–present: Converge FiberXers

Career highlights
- UAAP champion (2023); PBA D-League champion (2024 Aspirants' Cup)

Jonnel Melo Policarpio is a Filipino professional basketball player for the Converge FiberXers of the Philippine Basketball Association (PBA). In high school, he won a title with Mapúa in 2018. In college, he played for the DLSU Green Archers, winning a title with them in 2023.

== Early life and high school career ==
Policarpio was born in Arayat, Pampanga, but grew up in the town of Macabebe. He played in ligang labas games growing up to help earn money for his family. He was scouted at a barangay league, which led to an invitation to try out for the Mapúa Red Robins. He got to play for Mapúa beginning in Grade 10.

In his first season with Mapúa, NCAA Season 94, Policarpio made an impact right away filling in for Will Gozum and Warren Bonifacio in the frontcourt, as they had moved up to the collegiate level. That season, they made it to the finals against La Salle Green Hills. In Game 1, he scored 15 points, but they lost to the defending champions. In Game 2, he led the team with a double-double of 14 points and 14 rebounds along with three blocks and three steals to force a Game 3. Mapúa was able to win in Game 3, making him a champion in his rookie season. For the season, he was named as the NCAA Juniors' Rookie of the Year, and was also named to the All-Defensive Team.

The following season, Policarpio continued to improve, and was at one point an MVP candidate with averages of 19.7 points and 11.7 rebounds. However, Mapúa did not make the playoffs with a 6–12 record. He was still able to win Defensive Player of the Year and make the Mythical Team and All-Defensive Team for NCAA Season 95.

Policarpio made it to the NBTC 24 rankings of 2019. Ranking among the best high school players in the country, he got to play in the 2019 NBTC All-Star Game. He also played in the SLAM Rising Stars Classic, and won the skills challenge.

Despite having a year left with Mapúa, Policarpio committed to De La Salle University (DLSU).

In 2022, Policarpio played in the SLAM Rising Stars Classic once again, where he was named as the game's MVP. He also played for Pampanga Delta in the Pilipinas Super League 21-Under Division, where in the Luzon leg of the tournament, he was named as the MVP.

=== Eligibility controversy ===
In 2024, controversy arose when Policarpio was accused of having falsified his academic documents leading up to NCAA Season 94. According to the documents, he had completed his Grade 10 studies at a learning center that had shut down during the 2017–18 school year. These findings would have made him ineligible to play for them in Season 94. The NCAA's Management Committee has since decided not to resolve the issue.

== College career ==
Policarpio played college basketball at DLSU for the Green Archers. At first however, he didn't get to play for DLSU during Season 84 and Season 85. This was due to him having incomplete documents and having to finish his studies at Sto. Tomas National High School. He finally became eligible to play in Season 86.

When the season started, Policarpio did not play much minutes. He got his first start in a win over the UST Growling Tigers, contributing nine points and six rebounds in 14 minutes. In the first round of eliminations, he averaged just 4.5 points, 3.2 rebounds, and 1.8 assists. To start the second round, he scored a college career-high 14 points and 11 rebounds for a double-double along with five assists off the bench in a win over UST. He then followed it up with 15 points and eight rebounds in a win over the NU Bulldogs, and 11 points eight rebounds, five assists, and one block in a win over the UP Fighting Maroons. DLSU went on to sweep the second round as he made a bigger contribution with his versatility, this time averaging 9.8 points, 7.2 rebounds, and 3.4 assists per game. From there, DLSU went on to win the title over UP. For the season, he averaged 6.7 points, 4.6 rebounds, and 2.2 assists in 16 games.

On February 13, 2024, it was announced that Policarpio would not be returning to DLSU due to personal problems. Days later, he decided to stay with DLSU for the second semester. During this time, he was a part of the DLSU team that won the 2024 PBA D-League Aspirants' Cup, and led DLSU to a title in 3x3 basketball. He also got to join them in the 2024 FilOil EcoOil Preseason Cup. Shortly after the FilOil tournament, on July 3, 2024, he announced that he would officially be leaving DLSU and declaring for the PBA draft.

== Professional career ==
Policarpio entered the PBA draft as the youngest player in the pool. During the PBA draft combine, he was named the draft combine MVP as his team won the mini-tournament and was also named to the Mythical Five.

=== NLEX Road Warriors (2024–2025) ===
Policarpio was drafted sixth overall by the NLEX Road Warriors in the Season 49 draft. He signed a three-year rookie deal with the team.

Against the Meralco Bolts, Policarpio made his PBA debut during the 2024 Governors' Cup. He scored in double digits in back-to-back losses to the Rain or Shine Elasto Painters and the San Miguel Beermen. In that conference, NLEX lost to the TNT Tropang Giga in the semifinals. During the 2024–25 Commissioner's Cup, he had a season-high 17 points and nine rebounds in a win over the Phoenix Fuel Masters.

=== Converge FiberXers (2026–present) ===
On February 24, 2026, Policarpio was traded by NLEX to the Converge FiberXers in a three-team trade with the Meralco Bolts.
