= La Union Paower =

- League: NBL
- Founded: 2019
- Folded: 2022
- Location: La Union

The La Union Paower (stylized as La Union PAOwer) is a professional basketball team based in La Union which plays in the Philippine National Basketball League (NBL).

== History ==
Backed by team owner and La Union Provincial Board Member Paolo Ortega, the La Union Paower made its debut in the National Basketball League (NBL) in the 2020 season. La Union lost the 2020 finals to the Pampanga Delta. It reached the final again in the 2021 season, but failed to win over Delta once again for the title.
