= Janine Pontejos =

Filipino basketball player

No. 7 – Akari Sparks
- Position: Guard
- League: WMPBL

Personal information
- Born: October 29, 1992 (age 34)
- Listed height: 5 ft 5 in (1.65 m)

Career information
- College: De La Salle Lipa; Centro Escolar University

Career history

Playing
- 2019: Taguig Lady Generals
- 2022: Philippine Army Lady Battalions
- 2025: San Juan Lady Knights
- 2026: Caloocan Lady Kankaloo
- 2026–present: Akari Sparks

Coaching
- 2024: CEU Lady Scorpions

Career highlights
- WNBL Most Valuable Player (2019)
Medals
Women's basketball
Philippines
SEA Games
Gold medal – first place	2019 Philippines	Team
Gold medal – first place	2021 Hanoi	Team
Gold medal – first place	2025 Bangkok	Team
Silver medal – second place	2023 Phnom Penh	Team
Women's 3x3 basketball
FIBA 3x3 World Cup
Gold medal – first place	2018 Bocaue	Shoot-out contest
SEA Games
Gold medal – first place	2019 Philippines	Team
Silver medal – second place	2023 Phnom Penh	Team

Janine Ricalde Pontejos (born October 29, 1992) is a Filipino professional basketball player who last played for the Caloocan Lady Kankaloo of the Women's Maharlika Pilipinas Basketball League (WMPBL). She has represented the Philippine national team in international competitions.

== Playing career ==
=== College ===
Janine Pontejos is noted as a homegrown player who have never played in the University Athletic Association of the Philippines (UAAP) basketball championship. She first took up basketball growing up with her siblings in Lemery, Batangas. Her first competitive experience in the sport was as a varsity player of De La Salle Lipa. She part of both the school's athletics and basketball team. She later transferred to the Centro Escolar University and became part of the CEU Lady Scorpions. With the Lady Scorpions, she was named MVP for four times in the Women's National Collegiate Athletic Association (WNCAA) and her team dominated the National Athletic Association of Schools, Colleges and Universities (NAASCU).

=== Club ===
Pontejos has played in the Women's National Basketball League in the Philippines. In its first season in 2019, Pontejos led the Taguig Lady Generals to a second place finish and she was named as season MVP. In the 2022 season, she helped the Philippine Army Lady Battalions clinch the WNBL title.

Janine Pontejos joined the San Juan Lady Knights of the Women's Maharlika Pilipinas Basketball League for the inaugural 2025 regular season For the 2026 season, Pontejos joined the Caloocan Lady Kankaloo before moving to the Akari Sparks of Rizal by June mid-season.

=== National team ===
Pontejos has played for the Philippine national team. She was a part of the Philippines national 3x3 side which took part in the 2018 FIBA 3x3 World Cup which was hosted in Bocaue, Bulacan. As an individual, she won the gold medal in that tournament's shoot-out competition.

She has suited up for the team in the 2019 Southeast Asian Games where she won two gold medals; as part of the traditional 5-a-side team and the 3x3 national team. She also played for the country at the 2019 William Jones Cup.

== Coaching career ==
As of 2021, Pontejos is part of the CEU Lady Scorpions staff as an assistant coach. In 2024, she became the head coach of the Scorpions leading them to a Women's National Collegiate Athletic Association (WNCAA) title. The Scorpions joined the inaugural tournament of the Women's Maharlika Pilipinas Basketball League in 2025.

== Personal life ==
Pontejos joined the Philippine Army in 2020. She holds the rank of Private First Class as of 2022. She has a degree in business administration from CEU.
