= 2021 WNBL–Philippines draft =

General information
- Sport: Basketball
- Date: February 13, 2021
- Sponsored by: Chooks-to-Go

Overview
- 39 total selections in 12 rounds
- League: Women's National Basketball League–Philippines
- Teams: 4
- First selection: Fille Claudine Cainglet (Glutagence)
- Most selections (12): Glutagence Glow Boosters
- Fewest selections (8): Parañaque Lady Aces

The 2021 WNBL–Philippines draft was the league's draft for the 2021 WNBL–Philippines season which is also the first season of the WNBL as a professional league. It is the first ever draft of the league. Delayed by restrictions related to the COVID-19 pandemic, the draft was held on February 13, 2021.

Fille Claudine Cainglet by the Glutagence Glow Boosters was the first overall pick of the draft.

== Combine ==
The draft combine was held from December 12 to 13, 2020 at the Victoria Sports Tower in Quezon City with 148 participants. It was earlier supposed to be held from October 12 to 16 in Pampanga under a "bubble" setup as part of precautionary measures related to the COVID-19 pandemic.

== Draft lottery ==
The draft lottery was scheduled be held on October 18, 2020. However the draft lottery was delayed and was held on February 7, 2021 as an online event. The draft order per team varied depending on various factors including the number of "protected" players per team. The Glutagence Glow Boosters made the first pick for the first round since they had the fewest protected players at three, all of which took part in the inaugural 2019 WNBL season. Not all teams got to make their pick in every round and the completion of documentary requirements influenced the draft order for a certain round. Two teams would potentially join the league between the draft lottery and the draft proper, and their draft order would likewise be influenced by the number of their protected players. However these teams, later announced to be the Taguig Lady Generals and Zele Wellness Center, were not able to join in time for the draft.

== Eligibility ==
Entrants had to apply in order to be eligible for the draft. Initially the WNBL set September 30 as the deadline for prospect players to apply for the draft but the league moved the deadline earlier to September 22 due to the sheer number of applicants. At least 683 players applied for the draft.

The eligibility criteria were as follows:

- Be 21 to 40 years of age
- Be Filipino and born in the Philippines

Prior to the 2021 season, players of the WNBL had to be 18 to 35 years old. The age requirement was changed to allow older players to play in the league. The age eligibility for prospects above age 40 may be waived if they are deemed competitive enough to play. The league is open to "homegrown" Filipino players which meant players born anywhere in the Philippines and does not exclude players who lived abroad. Collegiate players are not prohibited from joining the draft but are encouraged to graduate first before entering future drafts to avoid complications with their mother collegiate leagues.

Players of the Philippine Navy Lady Sailors – Go For Gold were excluded from the draft since all of them are also enlisted military personnel. This would apply to a team of the Philippine Army had they also joined the 2021 season.

115 players were eligible for selection in the draft.

== Protected players ==
Each team could classify up to seven players as "protected" which would allow them to directly hire a player into their lineup.

=== Players ===
Team	Protected players
Parañaque Lady Aces	Jamie Alcoy; Clare Castro; Allana Lim; Carmina Reyes; April Siat; Mardyn Tingcang; Kris Tolentino
Pacific Water Queens	Precious Arellado; Jollina Go; Valerie Mamaril; Pam Payac; Adeline Sebastian; Girly Villaflores
Quezon Lady Spartan	Krystine Duran; Chicky Faroan; Phaula Nadres; Evita Naynes; Wami Taroja
Glutagence Glow Boosters	Nicole Delos Reyes; Micah Joy Figuracion; Julie Pearl Gula

=== By number of players ===
Team	Protected players	Number of picks
Parañaque Lady Aces	7	8
Pacific Water Queens	6	9
Quezon Lady Spartan	5	10
Glutagence Glow Boosters	3	12
Total	21	39

== Draft selections ==
=== Round 1 ===
Pick	Player	Position	Team
1	Fille Claudine Cainglet		Glutagence Glow Boosters

=== Round 2 ===
Pick	Player	Position	Team
2	Camille Claro		Glutagence Glow Boosters

=== Round 3 ===
Pick	Player	Position	Team
3	Khate Castillo		Glutagence Glow Boosters
4	Dianne Ventura		Quezon Lady Spartan

=== Round 4 ===
Pick	Player	Position	Team
5	Kat Araja		Quezon Lady Spartan
6	Snow Peraja		Pacific Water Queens
7	Camille Sambile		Glutagence Glow Boosters

=== Round 5 ===
Pick	Player	Position	Team
8	Jo Nathalie Razalo		Quezon Lady Spartan
9	Cara Buendia		Pacific Water Queens
10	Angeli Gloriani		Parañaque Lady Aces
11	April Lualhati		Glutagence Glow Boosters

=== Round 6 ===
Pick	Player	Position	Team
12	Joy Galica		Parañaque Lady Aces
13	Nicole Cancio		Glutagence Glow Boosters
14	Elaisa Adriano		Pacific Water Queens
15	Angelica de Austria		Quezon Lady Spartan

=== Round 7 ===
Pick	Player	Position	Team
16	Jhenn Angeles		Parañaque Lady Aces
17	Karla Manuel		Quezon Lady Spartan
18	Crislyn Mier		Pacific Water Queens
19	Carol Sangalang		Glutagence Glow Boosters

=== Round 8 ===
Pick	Player	Position	Team
20	Cristine Cortizano		Pacific Water Queens
21	Nikka Tupaz		Quezon Lady Spartan
22	Raiza Palmera-Dy		Glutagence Glow Boosters
23	Vanessa Santos		Parañaque Lady Aces

=== Round 9 ===
Pick	Player	Position	Team
24	Nicky Garcia		Glutagence Glow Boosters
25	Nikka Tupaz		Pacific Water Queens
26	Monique del Carmen		Parañaque Lady Aces
27	Jade Valenzuela		Quezon Lady Spartan

=== Round 10 ===
Pick	Player	Position	Team
28	Jenna Solis		Parañaque Lady Aces
29	Nefriteri Taller		Pacific Water Queens
30	Anna Marika Iida		Quezon Lady Spartan
31	Samantha Tan		Glutagence Glow Boosters

=== Round 11 ===
Pick	Player	Position	Team
32	Sthefanie Ventura		Parañaque Lady Aces
33	Ayra Nil Hufanda		Glutagence Glow Boosters
34	Janella Alba		Pacific Water Queens
35	Veronica Lio		Quezon Lady Spartan

=== Round 12 ===
Pick	Player	Position	Team
36	Jaira Baarde		Parañaque Lady Aces
37	Jinky Balasta		Pacific Water Queens
38	Rozanne Ramos		Quezon Lady Spartan
39	Camille Ramos		Glutagence Glow Boosters

Source: Tiebreaker Times/NBL-Philippines
