= Quezon Lady Spartan =

Women's basketball team

- League: WNBL–Philippines
- Ownership: Helen Tan

The STAN Quezon Lady Spartan (stylized as Quezon Lady SparTAN) is a professional women's basketball team which plays in the Women's National Basketball League of the Philippines.

The team represents the province of Quezon. It is owned by Helen Tan, who is also a member of the House of Representatives of the Philippines. Tan as a congresswoman represents the province's fourth district. Tan also owns the Sulong Stan Spartan men's team which plays in the National Basketball League.
