= Pilipinas Super League D2 Super Cup =

Pilipinas Super League invitational tournament in Quezon

Tournament details
- Country: Philippines
- Venue(s): Tiaong Convention Center; Sariaya Sports Center
- Dates: June 2–11, 2023
- Teams: 14

Final positions
- Champions: Siomai King
- Runner-up: Tiaong Meaksyon
- Third place: Manila CityStars
- Fourth place: San Antonio Bobcats

Tournament statistics
- Matches played: 26

The Pilipinas Super League D2 Super Cup, also simply referred to as the D2 Super Cup, was a Pilipinas Super League-sanctioned invitational tournament that took place across the province of Quezon. The tournament ran from June 2 to 11, 2023.

Siomai King were the champions of the tournament, after defeating Tiaong Meaksyon with a score of 83–76 in the final game.

== Teams and groups ==
Group A
Team	Locality
Antipolo San Luis Pilgrims	San Luis, Antipolo, Rizal
Kuala Lumpur Aseel	Kuala Lumpur, Malaysia
San Antonio Bobcats	San Antonio, Quezon
Siomai King	—

Group B
Team	Locality
Enverga RV Sports Wildcats	—
Gumaca Kuyas	Gumaca, Quezon
Tiaong Meaksyon	Tiaong, Quezon

Group C
Team	Locality
AMA Online Education Titans	—
Berbets Engineering Services	—
Gilas Sariaya	Sariaya, Quezon

Group D
Team	Locality
Candelaria	Candelaria, Quezon
Manila CityStars	Manila
MFT Fruitmasters	—
Zamboanga Valientes	Zamboanga Peninsula

== Format ==
All participating teams were drawn into four groups. Groups A and D consist of four teams each, while groups B and C consist of three teams each. The teams play in a single round-robin format, playing one against all other teams in the same group.

The top two teams advance to a three-round, single-elimination playoff bracket. Every round is a single-game knockout.

== Group stage ==
=== Group A ===
Pos	Team	Pld	W	L	PF	PA	PD	PCT	GB	Qualification	SIO	SAB	KLA	ASL
1	Siomai King	3	3	0	308	221	+87	1.000	—	Playoffs	—	94–75	95–70	119–76
2	San Antonio Bobcats	3	2	1	165	155	+10	.667	1	Playoffs	75–94	—	70–61	20–0
3	Kuala Lumpur Aseel	3	1	2	207	231	−24	.333	2		70–95	61–70	—	76–66
4	Antipolo San Luis Pilgrims	3	0	3	142	215	−73	.000	3		76–119	0–20	66–76	—

Source: Group A Schedule – via Genius Sports

=== Group B ===
Pos	Team	Pld	W	L	PF	PA	PD	PCT	GB	Qualification	TIA	GMC	ENV
1	Tiaong Meaksyon	2	2	0	151	134	+17	1.000	—	Playoffs	—	70–58	81–76
2	Gumaca Kuyas	2	1	1	154	141	+13	.500	1	Playoffs	58–70	—	96–71
3	Enverga RV Sports Wildcats	2	0	2	147	177	−30	.000	2		76–81	71–96	—

Source: Group B Schedule – via Genius Sports

=== Group C ===
Pos	Team	Pld	W	L	PF	PA	PD	PCT	GB	Qualification	BRB	AMA	SRI
1	Berbets Engineering Services	2	2	0	148	118	+30	1.000	—	Playoffs	—	74–65	74–53
2	AMA Online Education Titans	2	1	1	147	143	+4	.500	1	Playoffs	65–74	—	82–69
3	Gilas Sariaya	2	0	2	122	156	−34	.000	2		53–74	69–82	—

Source: Group C Schedule – via Genius Sports

=== Group D ===
Pos	Team	Pld	W	L	PF	PA	PD	PCT	GB	Qualification	MNL	ZAM	MFT	CDL
1	Manila CityStars	3	3	0	287	244	+43	1.000	—	Playoffs	—	91–86	97–88	99–70
2	Zamboanga Valientes	3	2	1	295	233	+62	.667	1	Playoffs	86–91	—	109–76	100–66
3	MFT Fruitmasters	3	1	2	247	284	−37	.333	2		88–97	76–109	—	83–78
4	Candelaria	3	0	3	214	282	−68	.000	3		70–99	66–100	78–83	—

Source: Group D Schedule – via Genius Sports

== Playoffs ==
=== Bracket ===
Quarterfinals
A2	San Antonio	84
C1	Berbets	78
A1	Siomai King	104
C2	AMA	80
B2	Gumaca	75
D1	Manila	86
B1	Tiaong	86
D2	Zamboanga	67

Semifinals
A2	San Antonio	79
A1	Siomai King	90
D1	Manila	68
B1	Tiaong	79

Finals
A1	Siomai King	83
B1	Tiaong	76
Battle for Third
A2	San Antonio	73
D1	Manila	82
