= 2026 MPPT Invitational =

Inaugural season of the Maharlika Pilipinas Pickleball Tour

2026 MPPT Invitational Tour
- League: Maharlika Pilipinas Pickleball Tour
- Sport: Pickleball
- Duration: October 3 – December 6
- Teams: 12
- TV partner: Solar Sports
- Streaming partner: Facebook

Regular season

The 2026 MPPT Invitational is the inaugural pre-season of the Maharlika Pilipinas Pickleball Tour (MPPT).

== Format ==
The format of the 2026 MPPT season consisting of four legs with two stages per leg:

- Super Saturday – Group stage consisting of matches of three sets: men's doubles, women's doubles, and mixed doubles.
- Championship Sunday – Knockout round elimination stages consisting of matches of four sets: men's doubles, women's doubles, and two sets of mixed doubles, with tiebreaker set as necessary.

Each leg has a price money allocation depending on final rankings.

The leg champion received 25 points, the runner-up received 15 points, and the semifinalists received 10 points.

The top two teams with the highest points after four legs will face against each other for the National finals.

== Leg 1: Pampanga ==
The Pampanga Leg was held on October 3 and 4 at Pickleball Central PH in Angeles.

=== Group stage (October 3) ===
==== Group A ====
Pos	Team	Pld	W	L	Pts	Qualification
1	Abra River Paddlers	15	13	2	41	Quarterfinals
2	GenSan Punchers	15	9	6	33	Quarterfinals
3	Bangued Miki	15	8	7	31	Quarterfinals
4	Batangas Bangers	15	7	8	29	Quarterfinals
5	Bacoor City Strikers	15	6	9	27	
6	Camarines Norte Golden Hawks	15	2	13	19	

Rules for classification: 1) Wins; 2a) If two teams are tied, head-to-head match-up and aggregate; 2b) If three or more teams are tied, head-to-head point differential; 3) overall point differential; 4) coin toss.

==== Group B ====
Pos	Team	Pld	W	L	Pts	Qualification
1	Parañaque Titans	15	15	0	45	Quarterfinals
2	Alfonso Siklab	15	10	5	35	Quarterfinals
3	Rizal Illustrados	15	8	7	31	Quarterfinals
4	Tacloban Aces	15	5	10	25	Quarterfinals
5	Pampanga Chiefs	15	4	11	23	
6	Muntinlupa Smashers	15	3	12	21	

Rules for classification: 1) Wins; 2a) If two teams are tied, head-to-head match-up and aggregate; 2b) If three or more teams are tied, head-to-head point differential; 3) overall point differential; 4) coin toss.

=== Knockout round (October 4) ===
Quarterfinals
A1	Abra	3
B4	Tacloban	2
B2	Alfonso	3
A3	Bangued	0
B1	Parañaque	3
A4	Batangas	0
A2	GenSan	2
B3	Rizal	3

Semifinals
A1	Abra	3
B2	Alfonso	0
B1	Parañaque	3
B3	Rizal	1

Finals
A1	Abra	0
B1	Parañaque	3

==== Quarterfinals ====
	Score		Set 1	Set 2	Set 3	Set 4	Set 5
(A1) Abra River Paddlers	3–2	(B4) Tacloban Aces	3–11	11–5	4–11	11–9	25–22
(B2) Alfonso Siklab	3–0	(A3) Bangued Miki	7–11	3–11	4–11	—	—
(B1) Parañaque Titans	3–0	(A4) Batangas Bangers	2–11	7–11	4–11	—	—
(A2) GenSan Punchers	2–3	(B3) Rizal Illustrados	11–2	6–11	14–12	11–13	20–25

==== Semifinals ====
	Score		Set 1	Set 2	Set 3	Set 4	Set 5
(A1) Abra River Paddlers	3–0	(B2) Alfonso Siklab	13–11	11–7	11–9	—	—
(B1) Parañaque Titans	3–1	(B3) Rizal Illustrados	11–2	6–11	11–9	11–7	—

==== Final ====
	Score		Set 1	Set 2	Set 3	Set 4	Set 5
(A1) Abra River Paddlers	0–3	(B1) Parañaque Titans	2–11	6–11	9–11	—	—

- Leg champion – Parañaque Titans (25 points)
- Leg runner-up – Abra River Paddlers (15 points)
- Leg semifinalists – Alfonso Siklab and Rizal Illustrados (10 points)

== Leg 2: Tagaytay ==
The Tagaytay Leg was held on October 17 and 18 at Tagaytay City Velodrome in Tagaytay.

=== Group stage (October 17) ===
==== Group A ====
Pos	Team	Pld	W	L	Pts	Qualification
1	Abra River Paddlers	15	14	1	43	Quarterfinals
2	GenSan Punchers	15	9	6	33 (Note: GenSan wins tiebreaker over Rizal based on head-to-head match-up (2–1).)	Quarterfinals
3	Rizal Illustrados	15	9	6	33	Quarterfinals
4	Bangued Miki	15	6	9	27	Quarterfinals
5	Pampanga Chiefs	15	5	10	25	
6	Camarines Norte Golden Hawks	15	2	13	19	

Rules for classification: 1) Wins; 2a) If two teams are tied, head-to-head match-up and aggregate; 2b) If three or more teams are tied, head-to-head point differential; 3) overall point differential; 4) coin toss.

==== Group B ====
Pos	Team	Pld	W	L	Pts	Qualification
1	Parañaque Titans	15	13	2	41	Quarterfinals
2	Alfonso Siklab	15	10	5	35	Quarterfinals
3	Batangas Bangers	15	9	6	33	Quarterfinals
4	Tacloban Aces	15	8	7	31	Quarterfinals
5	Bacoor City Strikers	15	3	12	21	
6	Muntinlupa Smashers	15	2	13	19	

Rules for classification: 1) Wins; 2a) If two teams are tied, head-to-head match-up and aggregate; 2b) If three or more teams are tied, head-to-head point differential; 3) overall point differential; 4) coin toss.

=== Knockout round (October 18) ===
Quarterfinals
A1	Abra	2
B4	Tacloban	3
B2	Alfonso	0
A3	Rizal	3
B1	Parañaque	3
A4	Bangued	0
A2	GenSan	3
B3	Batangas	0

Semifinals
B4	Tacloban	3
A3	Rizal	1
B1	Parañaque	3
A2	GenSan	1

Finals
B4	Tacloban	1
B1	Parañaque	3

==== Quarterfinals ====
	Score		Set 1	Set 2	Set 3	Set 4	Set 5
(A1) Abra River Paddlers	2–3	(B4) Tacloban Aces	10–12	9–11	11–7	11–7	29–30
(B2) Alfonso Siklab	0–3	(A3) Rizal Illustrados	5–11	2–11	4–11	—	—
(B1) Parañaque Titans	3–0	(A4) Bangued Miki	11–8	11–1	3–11	—	—
(A2) GenSan Punchers	3–0	(B3) Batangas Bangers	11–9	11–3	11–1	—	—

==== Semifinals ====
	Score		Set 1	Set 2	Set 3	Set 4	Set 5
(B4) Tacloban Aces	3–1	(A3) Rizal Illustrados	11–0	12–10	4–11	11–5	—
(B1) Parañaque Titans	3–1	(A2) GenSan Punchers	11–3	11–0	9–11	11–4	—

==== Final ====
	Score		Set 1	Set 2	Set 3	Set 4	Set 5
(B4) Tacloban Aces	1–3	(B1) Parañaque Titans	11–9	4–11	1–11	5–11	—

- Leg champion – Parañaque Titans (25 points)
- Leg runner-up – Tacloban Aces (15 points)
- Leg semifinalists – GenSan Punchers and Rizal Illustrados (10 points)

== Leg 3: Imus ==
The Imus Leg was held on November 7 and 8 at Melmac Sports, Vista Mall Imus in Imus, Cavite.

=== Group stage (November 7) ===
==== Group A ====
Pos	Team	Pld	W	L	Pts	Qualification
1	Abra River Paddlers	15	14	1	43	Quarterfinals
2	Bangued Miki	15	10	5	35	Quarterfinals
3	Tacloban Aces	15	9	6	33	Quarterfinals
4	Bacoor City Strikers	15	7	8	29	Quarterfinals
5	Batangas Bangers	15	4	11	23	
6	Muntinlupa Smashers	15	1	14	17	

Rules for classification: 1) Wins; 2a) If two teams are tied, head-to-head match-up and aggregate; 2b) If three or more teams are tied, head-to-head point differential; 3) overall point differential; 4) coin toss.

==== Group B ====
Pos	Team	Pld	W	L	Pts	Qualification
1	Parañaque Titans	15	12	3	39	Quarterfinals
2	GenSan Punchers	15	11	4	37	Quarterfinals
3	Alfonso Siklab	15	10	5	35	Quarterfinals
4	Rizal Illustrados	15	7	8	29	Quarterfinals
5	Pampanga Chiefs	15	3	12	21	
6	Camarines Norte Golden Hawks	15	2	13	19	

Rules for classification: 1) Wins; 2a) If two teams are tied, head-to-head match-up and aggregate; 2b) If three or more teams are tied, head-to-head point differential; 3) overall point differential; 4) coin toss.

=== Knockout round (November 8) ===
Quarterfinals
A1	Abra	0
B4	Rizal	3
B2	GenSan	1
A3	Tacloban	3
B1	Parañaque	3
A4	Bacoor	0
A2	Bangued	0
B3	Alfonso	3

Semifinals
B4	Rizal	3
A3	Tacloban	1
B1	Parañaque	2
B3	Alfonso	3

Finals
B4	Rizal	1
B3	Alfonso	3

==== Quarterfinals ====
	Score		Set 1	Set 2	Set 3	Set 4	Set 5
(A1) Abra River Paddlers	0–3	(B4) Rizal Illustrados	5–11	9–11	2–11	–	–
(B2) GenSan Punchers	1–3	(A3) Tacloban Aces	3–11	5–11	11–7	8–11	–
(B1) Parañaque Titans	3–0	(A4) Bacoor City Strikers	11–1	11–8	11–4	–	–
(A2) Bangued Miki	0–3	(B3) Alfonso Siklab	9–11	7–11	7–11	–	–

==== Semifinals ====
	Score		Set 1	Set 2	Set 3	Set 4	Set 5
(B4) Rizal Illustrados	3–1	(A3) Tacloban Aces	2–11	11–9	12–10	11–9	–
(B1) Parañaque Titans	2–3	(B3) Alfonso Siklab	11–5	5–11	11–4	7–11	18–25

==== Final ====
	Score		Set 1	Set 2	Set 3	Set 4	Set 5
(B4) Rizal Illustrados	1–3	(B3) Alfonso Siklab	7–11	11–6	2–11	3–11	–

- Leg champion – Alfonso Siklab (25 points)
- Leg runner-up – Rizal Illustrados (15 points)
- Leg semifinalists – Parañaque Titans and Tacloban Aces (10 points)

== Leg 4: Bacoor ==
The Bacoor Leg will be held on November 20, 21 and 22 at Strike Gymnasium in Bacoor, Cavite.

=== Group stage (November 20 and 21) ===
==== Group A ====
Pos	Team	Pld	W	L	Pts	Qualification
1	Rizal Illustrados	15	12	3	39	Quarterfinals
2	Bacoor City Strikers	15	10	5	35	Quarterfinals
3	Bangued Miki	15	9	6	33	Quarterfinals
4	Batangas Bangers	15	6	9	27	Quarterfinals
5	Pampanga Chiefs	15	5	10	25	
6	Camarines Norte Golden Hawks	15	3	12	21	

Rules for classification: 1) Wins; 2a) If two teams are tied, head-to-head match-up and aggregate; 2b) If three or more teams are tied, head-to-head point differential; 3) overall point differential; 4) coin toss.

==== Group B ====
Pos	Team	Pld	W	L	Pts	Qualification
1	Abra River Paddlers	15	11	4	37	Quarterfinals
2	Parañaque Titans	15	10	5	35 (Note: Parañaque wins tiebreaker over Tacloban based on head-to-head match-up (2–1).)	Quarterfinals
3	Tacloban Aces	15	10	5	35	Quarterfinals
4	GenSan Punchers	15	7	8	29 (Note: GenSan wins tiebreaker over Alfonso based on head-to-head match-up (2–1).)	Quarterfinals
5	Alfonso Siklab	15	7	8	29	
6	Muntinlupa Smashers	15	0	15	15	

Rules for classification: 1) Wins; 2a) If two teams are tied, head-to-head match-up and aggregate; 2b) If three or more teams are tied, head-to-head point differential; 3) overall point differential; 4) coin toss.

=== Knockout round (November 22) ===
Quarterfinals
A1	Rizal	3
B4	GenSan	1
B2	Parañaque	3
A3	Bangued	2
B1	Abra	3
A4	Batangas	0
A2	Bacoor	1
B3	Tacloban	3

Semifinals
A1	Rizal	3
B2	Parañaque	2
B1	Abra	3
B3	Tacloban	0

Finals
A1	Rizal	0
B1	Abra	3

==== Quarterfinals ====
	Score		Set 1	Set 2	Set 3	Set 4	Set 5
(A1) Rizal Illustrados	3–1	(B4) GenSan Punchers	11–6	14–12	8–11	11–2	–
(B2) Parañaque Titans	3–2	(A3) Bangued Miki	8–11	11–7	11–2	9–11	25–18
(B1) Abra River Paddlers	3–0	(A4) Batangas Bangers	11–4	11–5	11–1	–	–
(A2) Bacoor City Strikers	1–3	(B3) Tacloban Aces	5–11	7–11	11–3	3–11	–

==== Semifinals ====
	Score		Set 1	Set 2	Set 3	Set 4	Set 5
(A1) Rizal Illustrados	3–2	(B2) Parañaque Titans	11–9	12–10	5–11	9–11	25–20
(B1) Abra River Paddlers	3–0	(B3) Tacloban Aces	12–10	13–11	11–2	–	–

==== Final ====
	Score		Set 1	Set 2	Set 3	Set 4	Set 5
(A1) Rizal Illustrados	0–3	(B1) Abra River Paddlers	6–11	6–11	8–11	–	–

- Leg champion – Abra River Paddlers (25 points)
- Leg runner-up – Rizal Illustrados (15 points)
- Leg semifinalists – Parañaque Titans and Tacloban Aces (10 points)

== Summary of rankings ==
=== Overall rankings ===
Pos	Team	Pld	W	L	Pts	Qualification
1	Parañaque Titans	99	78	21	325	National finals
2	Abra River Paddlers	88	69	19	266	National finals
3	Rizal Illustrados	99	57	42	263	
4	Tacloban Aces	93	48	45	224	
5	Alfonso Siklab	81	49	32	214	
6	GenSan Punchers	80	44	36	178	
7	Bangued Miki	74	35	39	144	
8	Batangas Bangers	69	26	43	121	
9	Bacoor City Strikers	67	27	40	121	
10	Pampanga Chiefs	60	17	43	94	
11	Muntinlupa Smashers	60	6	54	72	
12	Camarines Norte Golden Hawks	60	9	51	78	

Rules for classification: 1) Points; 2a) If two teams are tied, head-to-head match-up and aggregate; 2b) If three or more teams are tied, head-to-head point differential; 3) overall point differential; 4) coin toss.

=== Summary of points ===
Key
Champion
Runner-up
Semifinalist
Quarterfinalist
Group stage
Host

Summary of points
Team	Leg				Total
Team	1	2	3	4	Total
Abra River Paddlers	79	52	46	89	266
Alfonso Siklab	57	38	90	29	214
Bacoor City Strikers	27	21	32	41	121
Bangued Miki	34	30	38	42	144
Batangas Bangers	32	36	23	30	121
Camarines Norte Golden Hawks	19	19	19	21	78
GenSan Punchers	42	58	43	35	178
Muntinlupa City Smashers	21	19	17	15	72
Pampanga Chefs	23	25	21	25	94
Parañaque Titans	98	95	67	65	325
Rizal Illustrados	58	58	69	78	263
Tacloban Aces	34	73	59	58	224

== National finals ==
The National finals will be held on December 5 and 6. The Top two teams with the highest points after four legs will face against each other.
