= 2023 NBL–Pilipinas Chairman's Cup =

- League: National Basketball League (Philippines)
- Sport: Basketball
- Duration: Elimination round: December 1, 2023 – February 11, 2024; Semifinals and Finals: February 21 – March 13, 2024
- Number of teams: 7
- TV partner(s): Television: Aliw Channel 23

Elimination round
- Season MVP: Mike Jefferson Sampurna (Taguig City Generals)

Finals
- Champions: Taguig City Generals
- Runners-up: CamSur Express
- Finals MVP: Lerry John Mayo (Taguig City Generals)

NBL–Pilipinas seasons
- ← 2023 President's 2024 →

The 2023 NBL–Pilipinas Chairman's Cup was the second conference of the National Basketball League (Philippines) in 2023, the third edition of the Chairman's Cup, and eighth overall. This conference features seven teams.

Taguig City Generals successfully defended their NBL championship for the third consecutive conference after sweeping the CamSur Express, 3–0, in best-of-5 championship series.

== Teams ==
The participating teams and groupings were revealed on November 27, 2023.

Name	Locality	Head coach
Biñan Tatak Gel	Biñan, Laguna	Almer Almazora
CamSur Express	Camarines Sur	Genesis Molto
Makati Circus Music Festival	Makati	Bryan Beran
Muntinlupa Chiefs	Muntinlupa	Jonald Mabasa
Santa Rosa Eridanus	Santa Rosa, Laguna	Eric Camson
Taguig City Generals	Taguig	Bing Victoria
Zambales Eruption	Zambales	Elgin Espina

== Elimination round ==
=== Format ===
In the elimination round, the seven teams were drawn into two groups, with Group A consisting of three teams and Group B contains four. Every team will play one game against teams within the same group and two games against teams from the opposing group. In total, Group A teams will play ten games, while Group B teams will play nine games. The top two teams in each group qualified for the crossover semifinals.

=== Standings ===
Pos	Grp	Team	Pld	W	L	PCT	Qualification
1	B	x – Taguig City Generals	9	8	1	.889	Qualified for the semifinals
2	B	x – CamSur Express	9	7	2	.778 (Note: CamSur Express wins tiebreaker via head-to-head record over Santa Rosa Eridanus.)	Qualified for the semifinals
3	B	o – Santa Rosa Eridanus	9	7	2	.778	
4	B	o – Biñan Tatak Gel	8	5	3	.625	
5	A	x – Zambales Eruption	9	4	5	.444	Qualified for the semifinals
6	A	x – Muntinlupa Chiefs	9	1	8	.111	Qualified for the semifinals
7	A	o – Makati Circus Music Festival	10	0	10	.000	

o – Eliminated from playoff contention; x – Clinched playoffs

=== Results table ===
Legend
Won in regulation	Lost in regulation
Won in overtime	Lost in overtime
(*) Number of asterisks denotes number of overtime periods

2023 NBL–Pilipinas Chairman's Cup results table
Team	Game									
Team	1	2	3	4	5	6	7	8	9	10
Biñan (BIN)	SR; 99–104	CMS; 90–87*	ZBL; 112–113	MKT; 114–91	ZBL; 107–95	MUN; 124–83	TAG; 77–78	MKT; 143–123	—	—
Camarines Sur (CMS)	BIN; 87–90*	MKT; 113–95	ZBL; 90–94	MUN; 108–80	TAG; 99–88	MUN; 115–82	SR; 97–90	MKT; 109–76	ZBL; 110–53	—
Makati (MKT)	MUN; 96–102	CMS; 95–113	SR; 101–109	TAG; 91–120	BIN; 91–114	SR; 84–104	ZBL; 104–108	TAG; 82–100	CMS; 76–109	BIN; 123–143
Muntinlupa (MUN)	MKT; 102–96	ZBL; 105–107	TAG; 73–107	CMS; 80–108	BIN; 83–124	CMS; 82–115	TAG; 74–110	SR; 96–99	SR; 86–105	—
Santa Rosa (SR)	BIN; 104–99	MKT; 109–101	ZBL; 109–92	MKT; 104–84	CMS; 90–97	MUN; 99–96	MUN; 105–86	TAG; 65–83	—	—
Taguig (TAG)	ZBL; 110–103	MUN; 107–73	ZBL; 101–86	MKT; 120–91	CMS; 88–99	BIN; 78–77	MUN; 110–74	MKT; 100–82	SR; 83–65	—
Zambales (ZBL)	MUN; 107–105	TAG; 103–110	CMS; 94–90	TAG; 86–101	BIN; 113–112	SR; 92–109	BIN; 95–107	MKT; 108–104	CMS; 53–110	—
Updated as of: January 26, 2024

== Playoffs ==
Semifinals are a best-of-3 series, while the finals are a best-of-five series.

Semifinals (Best-of-3)
A1	Zambales Eruption	0
B2	CamSur Express	2
B1	Taguig City Generals	2
A2	Muntinlupa Chiefs	0

Finals (Best-of-5)
B2	CamSur Express	0
B1	Taguig City Generals	3

=== Semifinals ===
==== Zambales Eruption vs. Camarines Sur Express ====
Aliw Channel 23

February 21, 2024
6:30 pm

Watch

CamSur Express	84–71	Zambales Eruption
Scoring by quarter: 18–17, 24–18, 19–19, 23–17

Fuerte Sports Complex, Camarines Sur

Aliw Channel 23

February 23, 2024
6:30 pm

Watch

CamSur Express	100–74	Zambales Eruption
Scoring by quarter: 37–15, 19–19, 23–20, 21–20
CamSur wins series, 2–0

Fuerte Sports Complex, Camarines Sur

==== Taguig City Generals vs. Muntinlupa Chiefs ====
It was stated in the live broadcast during the halftime break of Game 1 of Semifinals series between CamSur Express and Zambales Eruption, and as stated by the league's Executive Vice President Rhose Montreal, that Muntinlupa Chiefs had forfeited the series to the Taguig City Generals, giving them a 2–0 series win by forfeiture and an automatic finals berth.

Taguig City Generals	20–0	Muntinlupa Chiefs

Taguig City Generals	20–0	Muntinlupa Chiefs
Taguig won the series by forfeiture
Taguig wins series, 2–0

=== Finals: CamSur Express vs. Taguig City Generals ===
The finals follow a 2–2–1 format, with the team having a better record during the eliminations hosting Games 1, 2, and 5 (if necessary), and the other team hosting Games 3 and 4.

Aliw Channel 23

March 3, 2024
6:30 pm

Watch

CamSur Express	81–88	Taguig City Generals
Scoring by quarter: 19–24, 24–18, 15–21, 23–25

Jun Dueñas Gymnasium, Taguig City

Aliw Channel 23

March 6, 2024
6:30 pm

Watch

CamSur Express	85–91	Taguig City Generals
Scoring by quarter: 31–31, 20–19, 18–17, 17–24

Jun Dueñas Gymnasium, Taguig City

Aliw Channel 23

March 13, 2024
6:30 pm

Watch

CamSur Express	85–94	Taguig City Generals
Scoring by quarter: 17–23, 19–33, 28–23, 21–15
Taguig wins series, 3–0

Fuerte Sports Complex, Camarines Sur

== Individual awards ==
The awarding ceremonies were held before the second game of the NBL Finals series between the CamSur Express and Taguig City Generals, and the league honored the individual winners.

- Most Valuable Player: Mike Jefferson Sampurna (Taguig City Generals)
- Mythical Five:
  - Ameer Niko Aguilar (Tatak Gel Biñan)
  - John Lester Maurillo (Eridanus Santa Rosa)
  - Verman Magpantay (CamSur Express)
  - Mike Jefferson Sampurna (Taguig City Generals)
  - Lyndon del Rosario (Zambales Eruption)
- Sportsmanship Award: Verman Magpantay (CamSur Express)
- Finals MVP: Lerry John Mayo (Taguig City Generals)
