= Maharlika Pilipinas Pickleball Tour =

Professional pickleball league

- Current season, competition or edition: 2026 MPPT Invitational
- Sport: Pickleball
- Founded: July 31, 2026; 2 months ago
- First season: 2026 (first tournament); 2027 (first season)
- Commissioner: Mark Espinosa
- No. of teams: 12
- Countries: Philippines
- Broadcasters: Solar Sports; TAP Sports iWant

The Maharlika Pilipinas Pickleball Tour (MPPT) is a regional professional pickleball league in the Philippines composed of twelve teams. The league was founded in 2026 by boxing legend Manny Pacquiao as the fifth league under the Maharlika Pilipinas banner.

The league will begin play with an Invitational tournament in October 2026 before its inaugural season in February 2027.

== History ==
The MPPT was first announced with a press release on May 7, 2026 before a formal launch on July 31. The league will begin play with an invitational tournament running from October to December, with the first leg running on October 3 and 4 in Angeles City. Twelve teams are confirmed to be taking part in the tournament. The tournament will feature five legs, each with a ₱1 million prize pool attached. Teams earn points based on results in each leg with the top eight advancing to the final tournament.

The MPPT is the fifth league under Pacquiao's series of leagues under the Maharlika Pilipinas banner. The league is sanctioned by the Games and Amusements Board (GAB), with Mark Espinosa serving as the inaugural commissioner and Joe Ramos as the inaugural CEO.

On September 22, 2026, the league signed a deal with Solar Sports to acquire the broadcast rights to the league, having previously acquired the broadcast rights to the Maharlika Pilipinas Basketball League in 2025.

== Teams ==
The MPPT will be composed twelve teams during the Invitational tournament. Each team's roster will be composed of three men and three women.

Overview of MPPT teams
Team	Home market		
Team	Home market	Abra River Paddlers	Abra
Alfonso Siklab	Alfonso, Cavite		
Bacoor City Strikers	Bacoor, Cavite		
Bangued Miki	Bangued, Abra		
Batangas Bangers	Batangas		
Camarines Norte Golden Hawks	Camarines Norte		
GenSan Punchers	General Santos		
Muntinlupa City Smashers	Muntinlupa		
Pampanga Chefs	Pampanga		
Parañaque Titans	Parañaque		
Rizal Illustrados	Rizal		
Tacloban Aces	Tacloban		

== Format ==
The format of the 2026 MPPT season consisting of two stages:

- Super Saturday – group stage consisting of matches of three sets: men's doubles, women's doubles, and mixed doubles.
- Championship Sunday – final round elimination stages consisting of matches of four sets: men's doubles, women's doubles, and two sets of mixed doubles, with tiebreaker set as necessary.
