= 2021 NBL–Pilipinas Chairman's Cup =

- League: NBL–Pilipinas
- Sport: Basketball
- Number of teams: 10
- Season MVP: Biboy Enguio (Muntinlupa)

Finals
- Champions: Pampanga Delta
- Runners-up: La Union Paower
- Finals MVP: Encho Serrano (Pampanga)

NBL–Pilipinas seasons
- ← 2019–20 President's 2022 President's →

The 2021 NBL–Pilipinas Chairman's Cup, also known as the 2021 Chooks-to-Go NBL Chairman's Cup for sponsorship reasons, was the fourth conference of NBL–Pilipinas. It was also the league's first conference under professional status as recognized by the Games and Amusement Board.

The inaugural pro league season opened on July 18, 2021 with 11 teams. However the league was suspended in July 30, 2021 due to stricter COVID-19 community quarantine imposed in Greater Manila. The NBL resumed play on September 18, 2021.

The Pampanga Delta clinched the 2021 NBL title at La Union Paower's expense.

== Teams ==
Team	Locality	Team governor	Head coach
DF Bulacan Republicans	Malolos, Bulacan	Daniel Fernando; Romeo Cardenas	Paul John Macapagal
Laguna Pistons	Santa Rosa and Biñan, Laguna	Amirh Moghadassi	Edmon Fontillas
La Union Paower	San Fernando, La Union	Pablo Ortega	Louie Aquino
Mindoro Tamaraws Disiplinados	Oriental Mindoro	Humerlito Dolor	Bengie Teodoro
Muntinlupa Water Warriors	Muntinlupa, Metro Manila	Angelito Alvarez	Siefred Levita
Pampanga Delta	San Fernando, Pampanga	Charlie Chua	Dennis Pineda
Parañaque Aces	Parañaque, Metro Manila	Marvin Santos	Stephen Mopera
Quezon Barons	Lucena, Quezon	Danilo Suarez	Jonas Guiao, Jr.
Stan District 4 SparTANs	Quezon	Helen Tan	Carmelo Alas
Taguig Generals	Taguig, Metro Manila	Lino Cayetano	Bing Victoria

== Venue ==
Due to the COVID-19 pandemic in Metro Manila, the season was played in Bren Z. Guiao Convention Center in San Fernando, Pampanga in a closed-circuit format behind closed doors.

San Fernando, Pampanga	2021 NBL–Pilipinas Chairman's Cup is located in Luzon
Bren Z. Guiao Convention Center	2021 NBL–Pilipinas Chairman's Cup is located in Luzon

== Elimination round ==
=== Results ===
Pos	Team	W	L	PCT	GB	Qualification
1	Pampanga Delta	9	1	.900	—	Advance to the semifinals
2	La Union Paower	8	2	.800	1	Advance to the semifinals
3	Muntinlupa Water Warriors	7	3	.700	2	Twice-to-beat in the quarterfinals
4	DF Bulacan Republicans	7	3	.700	2	Twice-to-beat in the quarterfinals
5	Taguig Generals	6	4	.600	3	Twice-to-win in the quarterfinals
6	Parañaque Aces	5	5	.500	4	Twice-to-win in the quarterfinals
7	Quezon Barons	5	5	.500	4	
8	Laguna Pistons	4	6	.400	5	
9	Mindoro Tamaraws Disiplinados	3	7	.300	6	
10	Stan District 4 Spartans	1	9	.100	8	
11	Zamboanga Valientes	0	10	.000	9	Withdrew

Source: NBL stats website

== Playoffs ==
Quarterfinals
4	Bulacan	0
5	Taguig	2
3	Muntinlupa	1
6	Parañaque	0

Semifinals
1	Pampanga	2
5	Taguig	0
2	La Union	2
5	Muntinlupa	0

Finals
1	Pampanga	2
2	La Union	0

=== Quarterfinals ===
The higher-seeded team has a twice-to-beat advantage. The lower-seeded team had to win over the other twice in order to advance to the semifinals. The higher seeded team only had to win once.

==== (3) Muntinlupa Water Warriors vs. (6) Parañaque Aces ====
November 13
4:00pm

box score

Muntinlupa Water Warriors	103–99	Parañaque Aces
Muntinlupa wins series in one game

Bren Z. Guiao Convention Center, San Fernando, Pampanga

==== (4) DF Bulacan Republicans vs. (5) Taguig Generals ====
November 13
6:00pm

box score

DF Bulacan Republicans	78–86	Taguig Generals

Bren Z. Guiao Convention Center, San Fernando, Pampanga

November 14
4:00pm

box score

Taguig Generals 105, DF Bulacan Republicans 94
Taguig wins series in two games

Bren Z. Guiao Convention Center, San Fernando, Pampanga

=== Semifinals ===
==== (1) Pampanga Delta vs. (5) Taguig Generals ====
November 20
6:00pm

box score

Taguig Generals	98–108	Pampanga Delta

Bren Z. Guiao Convention Center, San Fernando, Pampanga

November 21
4:00pm

box score

Pampanga Delta	112–108	Taguig Generals
Pampanga wins series, 2–0

Bren Z. Guiao Convention Center, San Fernando, Pampanga

==== (2) La Union PAOwer vs. (3) Muntinlupa Water Warriors ====
November 20
4:00pm

box score

La Union Paower	102–86	Muntinlupa Water Warriors

Bren Z. Guiao Convention Center, San Fernando, Pampanga

November 21
6:00pm

box score

Muntinlupa Water Warriors	84–107	La Union Paower
La Union wins series, 2–0

Bren Z. Guiao Convention Center, San Fernando, Pampanga

=== Finals: (1) Pampanga Delta vs. (2) La Union PAOwer ===
December 4
5:30pm

box score

Pampanga Delta	98–69	La Union Paower
Scoring by quarter: 25–18, 24–20, 39–10, 10–21
Pts: Hernandez 19; Rebs: Dyke 15; Asts: Serrano 10		Pts: Maynes 12; Rebs: Blaza 10; Asts: Pambid 8

Bren Z. Guiao Convention Center, San Fernando, Pampanga
Referees: J. Borja, J. Vipinoso, C. Tungol

December 5
5:30pm

box score

Pampanga Delta	111–98	La Union Paower
Scoring by quarter: 28–15, 25–32, 31–21, 27–30
Pts: Serrano 26; Rebs: Dyke 14; Asts: Garcia 11		Pts: Agulan 23; Rebs: Pambid 10; Asts: Pambid 11
Pampanga wins series, 2–0

Bren Z. Guiao Convention Center, San Fernando, Pampanga
Referees: J. Borja, C. Tungol, M. Vergara

== See also ==
- 2021 WNBL–Philippines season
