= DF Bulacan Republicans =

Basketball team in the Philippines

- League: NBL–Pilipinas
- Founded: 2021
- Folded: 2023
- Arena: Bulacan Capitol Gymnasium
- Location: Malolos, Bulacan

The Damayang Filipino Bulacan Republicans, also known as the DF Bulacan Republicans, are a professional basketball team based in Bulacan which last played in the Philippine National Basketball League (NBL).

The Bulacan Capitol Gymnasium in Malolos serves as the home venue of the Republicans.

== History ==
The DF Bulacan Republicans, a team intended to compete in the National Basketball League (NBL), were launched in early 2021 by team owners Daniel Fernando and Romy Cardenas Fernando, also the incumbent governor of the Bulacan at the time, clarified that the team is not under the supervision of the provincial government. Bulacan was last represented in the NBL by the Bulacan Makabayan which played in the 2018 season.

The Republican made their NBL debut in the 2021 season.
