= Allana Lim =

Filipino basketball player (born 1988)

Akari Sparks
- Position: Forward
- League: WMPBL

Personal information
- Born: September 12, 1988 (age 38)
- Listed height: 5 ft 10 in (1.78 m)

Career information
- College: FEU

Career history
- 2012: KL Ruby
- 2018: NS Matrix
- 2019: Iso Kite
- 2021: Parañaque Lady Aces
- 2025: Discovery Perlas
- 2026–present: Akari Sparks

Career highlights
- WMPBL champion (2026); WMPBL Finals MVP (2026); WMPBL Mythical Team (2026); WNBL champion (2021); WNBL Most Valuable Player (2021); 2x UAAP champion (2008, 2011); UAAP Finals MVP (2011)
Medals
Representing Philippines
Women's basketball
SEABA Championship
Gold medal – first place	2016 Malacca City	Team
Women's 3x3 basketball
Asian Beach Games
Bronze medal – third place	2012 Haiyang	Team

Allana May Lim (born September 12, 1988) is a Filipino professional basketball player for the Akari Sparks of the Women's Maharlika Pilipinas Basketball League.

== College career ==
She became a key player for the FEU Lady Tamaraws of the University Athletic Association of the Philippines (UAAP) helping her team reach the final in Season 73 and clinch the title in Season 74. She was also named as the Season 74 MVP.

== Professional career ==
After her graduation from FEU, she was signed in to play for KL Ruby of the Malaysian Women's Basketball League (MWBL). She debuted in KL Ruby's 66–55 win over Bina Puri, also the first win in that season coming in for injured Australian import Jessica Fergus. Lim scored 25 points and made 10 rebounds in that game. She went on to play in the MWBL for several years and had brief stints in leagues in Singapore, Thailand, and Indonesia. In 2018, Lim played for the NS Matrix of the MWBL.

Lim played for Iso Kite of the Nepal Women's Basketball League in its inaugural season in 2019. Iso Kite failed to progress to the final. Although Iso Kite failed to clinch a berth in the final, Lim was recognized as the top scorer for the season.

Lim in plays for the Parañaque Lady Aces Women's National Basketball League in the Philippines. In the draft for the 2021 season she was selected as one of the team's "protected players" which prevented her from being drafted to another team. Lim plays for Discovery Perlas of the Women's Maharlika Pilipinas Basketball League as of the 2025 season.

== 3x3 career ==
Lim also played 3x3 basketball. She played for Discovery Pilipinas team in the 2024 Manila Hustle 3x3.

== National team career ==
She has represented the Philippines in international basketball competitions such as the 2015 Southeast Asian Games, the 2016 SEABA Championship, and the 2017 FIBA Asia Women's Championship.
