= Women's National Basketball League (Philippines) =

Professional women's basketball league in the Philippines

Women's National Basketball League (WNBL)
- Sport: Basketball
- Founded: 2019
- First season: 2019
- Folded: 2022
- President: Rhose Montreal
- Commissioner: John Edward Aquino
- Country: Philippines
- Continent: FIBA Asia (Asia)
- Last champions: Philippine Army (1st title)
- Most titles: Philippine Army; PAF Lady Air Defenders; Parañaque Lady Aces (1 title each)
- Broadcaster: ALIW 23

The Women's National Basketball League (WNBL) is a women's professional basketball league in the Philippines. It is the men's counterpart of the National Basketball League (NBL–Pilipinas), sharing the same organization.

== History ==
The National Basketball League which maintains a men's league decided to organize a women's league as well to support the program of the Samahang Basketbol ng Pilipinas, the Philippines' national governing body for basketball.

The WNBL inaugural season began on April 7, 2019, and featured seven teams: Philippine Navy, Philippine Air Force, Taguig Lady Generals, Pampanga Delta Amazons, Cleon and Clyde Lady Snipers, Laguna Lady Pistons & Paranaque Lady Aces. Air Force won the inaugural title. The WNBL planned to hold its second season in 2020 but such move was cancelled due to the COVID-19 pandemic.

On August 26, 2020, the Games and Amusements Board accepted the NBL and WNBL's application to become professional leagues. The first WNBL draft was held on February 13, 2021.

The first professional season of the WNBL began on July 18, 2021.

The WNBL would launch their own 3x3 tournament with the first season held in 2021–22.

== Teams ==
=== Current teams ===
Team	Locality	Team governor	Head coach
Philippine Air Force - PSI Lady Air Defenders	n/a	MGen. Augustine Maliit	Alvin Zuniga
Philippine Army Lady Battalions	n/a	Col. John Oliver Gabun	SSgt. Gerry Gadong
Philippine Navy Lady Sailors – Go For Gold	n/a	Jeremy Go	Emelia Vega
Quezon Lady Spartan	Quezon	Angeline Helen Tan	Christine Isip
Taguig Lady Generals	Taguig, Metro Manila	Bing Victoria	Marc Robin Lucena

=== Former teams ===
- Cleon and Clyde Lady Snipers
- Glutagence Glow Boosters
- Laguna Lady Pistons
- Pacific Water Queens
- Pampanga Delta Amazons
- Parañaque Lady Aces

== List of champions ==
Season	Champion	Series	Runner-Up	Season MVP	Team
2019	PAF Lady Air Defenders	2–0	Taguig Lady Generals	Janine Pontejos	Taguig Lady Generals
2021	Parañaque Lady Aces	2–0	Taguig Lady Generals	Allana Lim	Parañaque Lady Aces
2022	Philippine Army Lady Battalions	2–0	Philippine Air Force – PSI Lady Air Defenders	Cindy Resultay	Philippine Air Force - PSI Lady Air Defenders
