= Parañaque Lady Aces =

Philippine Women's National Basketball League team

- League: WNBL–Philippines
- Founded: 2019
- Dissolved: 2021
- Ownership: Marvin Santos
- Championships: 1 (2021)

The Parañaque Lady Aces are a professional women's basketball team which plays in the Philippine Women's National Basketball League (WNBL). It is the women's counterpart of the Parañaque Aces which plays in the National Basketball League (NBL). It is supported by the city government of Parañaque and is owned by city councilor Marvin Santos.

== History ==
The Lady Aces first played in the WNBL during its 2019 season. Lacking in tall players, the team failed to progress to the playoffs in that season. When the WNBL turned professional for its 2021 season, the Lady Aces were among the participating teams and were able to acquire new players through the league's first ever draft while still keeping several of their core players such as Allana Lim and Clare Castro.

For the 2021 season, the Lady Aces swept the elimination round in eight games. They continued their winning ways up to the finals, and won the 2021 championship in two games. Lim won season MVP, while Jhenn Angeles joined her in the Mythical Five. The following season, the Lady Aces decided to not participate.

== National team players ==
- Allana Lim
- Clare Castro
