= Glutagence Glow Boosters =

- League: WNBL–Philippines
- Dissolved: 2021
- Ownership: Justin Tan
- 2021 position: Semifinals (Disqualified)

The Glutagence Glow Boosters were a professional women's basketball team playing in the Women's National Basketball League of the Philippines.

== History ==
The Glutagence Glow Boosters, owned by Justin Tan, were among the participating teams of the 2021 season of Women's National Basketball League of the Philippines, the league's first season as a professional league. In the inaugural WNBL draft, Glutagence had the most picks due to opting to only "protect" or guarantee three select players in its roster.

Glutagence were able to advance to the semifinals of the 2021 WNBL season. However, they were disqualified by the league after the team owners failed to pay the franchise fee and their opponents, the Taguig Lady Generals advance to the final series. The team management also reportedly fail to pay their players on time.
