= AMA Online Education Titans =

Basketball team in the Philippines

- Nickname: Online Education Titans
- League: PBA Developmental League (2014–2020); Filbasket (2022–present)
- Founded: 2014
- History: AMA Online Education Titans (2014–present)
- Main sponsor: AMA Computer College Inc.
- Ownership: AMA Computer College Inc.

The AMA Online Education Titans are a professional basketball team that play in the Filbasket. They are primarily base of varsity students from the AMA Computer University.

== History ==
The AMA Computer University wanted to participate in college leagues such as the National Collegiate Athletic Association (NCAA) and the University Athletic Association of the Philippines (UAAP) but can't manage to gain membership due to these league being established already. The school's basketball team briefly participated in the now defunct Philippine Basketball League and later entered the PBA Developmental League (PBA D-League) in 2014 as the AMA Online Education Titans. At that time the only school based team was the joint ball club by the Centro Escolar University and Café France.

By 2017, AMA had already a letter of intent to join the top-tier professional Philippine Basketball Association (PBA) as an expansion team. They plan to join the league within the next two to three years.

At least from 2011 to 2017, AMA has not employ foreign basketball players and has been selecting school-based players such as those from the NCAA, UAAP, the National Athletic Association of Schools, Colleges and Universities (NAASCU), and the National Capital Region Athletic Association (NCRAA).

=== Daniel Padilla issue ===
In the Titans' inaugural season, Daniel Padilla, a local actor who was signed as AMA University's advertisement endorser at the time, was selected as its final round draft pick. This left many spectators in the draft event at the PBA head office in Libis, Quezon City surprised as Padilla was not part of the 153 players who submitted their application for the draft. AMA invoked its right as a school-based team to sign a player who hasn't applied for the draft.

Padilla's professional handler, ABS-CBN's Star Magic denied reports Padilla was allowed to join the league and it was done without their prior knowledge. AMA claimed that Padilla was enrolled by the university as a freshman for the course Information Technology. Padilla responded to news reporters and stated that it was much of his surprise that he was drafted without his prior knowledge and declined to join the basketball league.
