= Taguig Lady Generals =

Basketball team

- League: WNBL–Philippines
- Head coach: Bing Victoria
- Ownership: Bing Victoria; Lino Cayetano
- 2019 position: 2nd

The Taguig Lady Generals are a women's professional basketball team playing in the Women's National Basketball League of the Philippines.

== Background ==
The Taguig Lady Generals are one of the teams which participated in the inaugural season of the Women's National Basketball League (WNBL) of the Philippines when it was still an amateur league. It is owned by basketball coach Bing Victoria and Taguig City Mayor Lino Cayetano. In the 2019 season, Taguig finished as runners-up with the PSI–Philippine Air Force Lady Defenders, the other finalists, clinching the league title.

It briefly left the WNBL after the 2019 season but rejoined in 2021 after the WNBL became a professional league. The Lady Generals missed the inaugural draft for the 2021 season which means that the team will have to rebuild its roster from free agents.
