= Games and Amusements Board =

Agency of the Philippine government

- Lupon sa mga Laro at Libangan
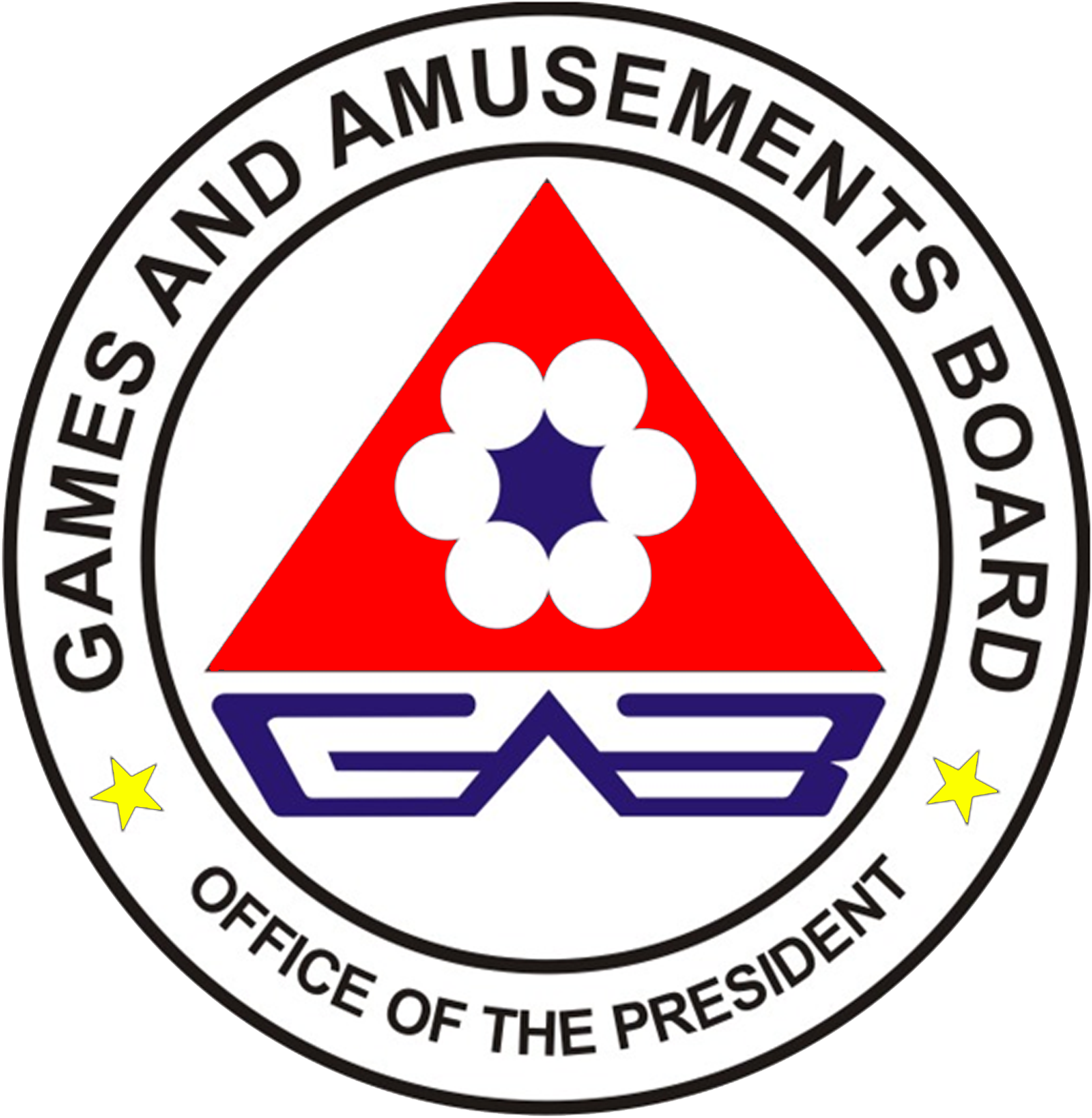

Agency overview
- Formed: 1951
- Jurisdiction: Philippines
- Headquarters: Makati, Metro Manila
- Employees: 132 (2024)
- Agency executive: Francisco Rivera, Chairman
- Parent department: Office of the President of the Philippines
- Website: gab.gov.ph

The Games and Amusements Board (GAB; Filipino: Lupon sa mga Laro at Libangan) is the government-run regulatory body of professional sports in the Philippines.

== History ==
The Games and Amusements Board initially began operations in 1951 with the issuance of Executive Order No. 392. Through this particular law, the powers, duties and functions previously exercised, and performed by:

1. The city and municipal mayors over fronton and basque pelota games
2. The Boxing and Wrestling Commission over boxing and wrestling
3. The Commission on Races over horse racing, were consolidated and transferred to the Board.

On March 20, 1974, upon the signing into law of Presidential Decree No. 420 creating the Philippine Racing Commission, the authority over horse racing was divided between the Board and the Philracom. GAB retained the function of supervision and regulation of the betting aspect of horse racing, while all other functions related to horse racing were transferred to Philracom.

On January 6, 1976, the scope of GAB's regulatory function over professional sports widened as the agency was tasked to likewise supervise and regulate the professional basketball and other professional games in the country.

The Board's regulatory function was further strengthened to address illegal gambling operations with the establishment of Anti-Illegal Gambling Unit (AIGU) on January 17, 1992 – which became one of GAB's units. AIGU initially was composed of personnel appointed by the Chairman of GAB and detailed staff from the Philippine National Police, the National Bureau of Investigation, the Philippine Racing Commission, the Philippine Charity Sweepstakes Office, other offices involved in gambling operations, as well as other law enforcement agencies in the country. On December 28, 1993, the board assumed part of the overall functions of the Gamefowl Commission, particularly insofar as international cockfight derbies are concerned.

In October 2020, GAB issued a joint order with the Philippine Sports Commission classifying any athlete who is paid for non-national team play will be considered professionals. Any sporting events which are conducted for profit were classified as professional in nature.

== Leadership ==
GAB, as an organization, is headed by a chairman and two commissioners

- Chairman: Francisco J. Rivera
- Commissioner for Administrative and Finance: Angel P. Bautista
- Commissioner for Operations: Manuel S. Plaza III

== Scope ==
=== Sports and activities ===
Professional sports and activities the GAB regulates include:

Sports

- Association football
- Basketball
- Billiards
- Bowling
- Boxing (including women's)
- Chess
- eSports
- Karate
- Mixed martial arts
- Pickleball
- Table tennis
- Tennis
- Volleyball
- Wrestling

Other activities

- Cockfighting
- horse racing betting

It is also mandated to crack down against illegal gambling practices in professional sports.

=== Leagues ===
The following are the national and top-flight sports leagues that are sanctioned by the GAB.

Sanctioned leagues by the Games and Amusements Board
League	Sport	Gender	Sanctioned since	Ref.
AsiaBasket	Basketball	Men's	2022	
MPL Philippines	Esports	Men's	2018	
Maharlika Pilipinas Basketball League	Basketball	Men's	2021	
National Basketball League	Basketball	Men's	2021	
Philippine Basketball Association	Basketball	Men's	1975	
Philippines Football League	Association football	Men's	2017	
Pilipinas Super League	Basketball	Men's	2022	
Premier Volleyball League	Volleyball	Women's	2020	
Professional Chess Association of the Philippines	Chess	Mixed	2020	
Sharks Billiards Association	Billiards	Men's	2024	
Women's Maharlika Pilipinas Basketball League	Basketball	Women's	2025	
East Asia Super League	Basketball	Men's	2020	
The Asian Tournament	Basketball	Men's	2024	
Philippine Kings League	Esports	Mixed	2025	
Maharlika Pilipinas Pickleball Tour	Pickleball	Mixed	2026	
Pickle Yard Conference League	Pickleball	Mixed	2026	

GAB considers leagues where participating athletes "play for pay" should be under its supervisions under its mandate. In November 2018, the GAB has announced plans to put leagues which meets this criterion under its supervision such as volleyball leagues, Spikers' Turf and Maharlika Pilipinas Volleyball Association, football leagues, PFF Women's League and Ang Liga, and futsal league, PFF Futsaliga despite some of the leagues' players still simultaneously playing in collegiate leagues.

=== Combat Sports Organizations ===
- Filipino Pro Wrestling
- ONE Championship
- Philippine Encuentro Championship
- PUSO Wrestling
- Underground Battle MMA
- Universal Reality Combat Championship
- Ultimate Muaythai Challenge Philippines
- Zeus Combat League

== See also ==
- Philippine Amusement and Gaming Corporation
- Philippine Charity Sweepstakes Office
