= Pampanga Delta =

- League: National Basketball League (formerly); Pilipinas Super League
- Founded: 2019
- Location: Pampanga
- Ownership: Dennis Pineda
- Championships: 3 (NBL)

The Pampanga Delta, also known as Pampanga Pradera Theme Park for sponsorship reasons, is a Filipino professional basketball team based in Pampanga. The team currently competes in the Pilipinas Super League's (PSL) 18-under division.

== History ==
=== National Basketball League ===
The Pampanga Delta is led and coached by with Governor Dennis "Delta" Pineda, who also serves as coach of the Pampanga Giant Lanterns in the Maharlika Pilipinas Basketball League (MPBL). It is credited for producing Philippine Basketball Association players, Ato Agustin and Arwind Santos.

The Pampanga Delta made their NBL debut in the 2019 season. Delta managed to advance to the final series, where they lost to the Taguig Generals. Delta reached the NBL finals again in the 2020 season but were able to clinch the league title this time, overcoming La Union PAOwer. The team clinched their second NBL title in the 2021 season, at La Union's expense once again.

The Delta left the NBL shortly after walking out during Game 2 of their 2022 NBL Chairman's Cup semifinals series against the La Union PAOwer on December 18, 2022. The walkout incident was triggered when Pampanga Delta player Archie Concepcion was thrown out after being caught spitting at PAOwer's Billy Ray Boado.

=== Pilipinas Super League ===
The team joined the PSL in 2023 as part of its 18-under division. The team reigned in the Luzon leg to advance to the 2023 18U Battle of the Champions. After beating the Mindanao South champion Max Ballers, the team was set to play against the Farm Fresh Milkers in the championship series. The game was delayed a couple of times due to Super Typhoon Egay. Eventually, the championship game was not played, and the prize money was instead donated to those who were affected by the typhoon.
