= National Basketball League (Philippines) =

Professional men's basketball league in the Philippines

National Basketball League (NBL)
- Upcoming season or competition: 2026-27 NBL-Pilipinas President's Cup
- Sport: Basketball
- Founded: 2018; 8 years ago
- First season: 2018
- President: Rhose Montreal
- Commissioner: John Edward Aquino
- Motto: Ang tahanan ng tunay na homegrown (transl. The home of the true homegrown)
- No. of teams: 10
- Country: Philippines
- Continent: FIBA Asia (Asia)
- Most recent champion: Tikas Kapampangan (2nd title)
- Most titles: Taguig Generals (5 titles)
- Broadcasters: TAP Sports; Premier Sports 2
- Website: http://nblp.web.geniussports.com/

The National Basketball League (NBL), also known as the NBL–Pilipinas, is a men's regional professional basketball league in the Philippines.

== History ==
On June 7, 2018, Celso "Soy" Mercado established the league and named National Basketball League Philippines to search undiscovered talents. The league features an away-and-home format, focusing on giving homegrown players (aged 18–30, and bonafide residents of the team's province, city or municipality) an opportunity to showcase their skills. The league began its inaugural season on August 25, 2018, with 10 teams from Luzon. Games were played every Saturday and Sunday. The Parañaque Aces became the league's first champions after defeating the Dasmariñas Ballers in the best-of-three championship round.

In 2019, the league expanded to 15 teams, while two of the founding teams folded (Marikina Shoemakers and Bulacan Makabayan). The Women's National Basketball League began their inaugural season on April 7, 2019. The league's youth division, named NBL-Youth, began its season on May 20, 2019. NBL Philippines season 3 opened November 16, 2019, with 14 teams competing (Bulacan, Iriga, Rizal, Zambales, Imus & Cainta begged off from competing, while Marikina Best Shoemakers returned to the league after a year absence). On August 26, 2020, the Games and Amusements Board have accepted the NBL and WNBL's application to become a professional league in 2021. The first professional season of the NBL began on July 18, 2021, at the Bren Z. Guiao Convention Center in Pampanga.

== Teams ==
Team	Locality	First season	Arena	Capacity	Team owner / governor	Head coach
Batangas Barako - Venom Art	Malvar, Batangas	2026 Governor's Cup	Malvar Sports Arena	2,000	Reagan Lat	Ringgo Jimenez
CamSur Express	Pili, Camarines Sur	2018	Fuerte Sports Complex	3,000	Gov. Luigi Villafuerte / Engr. Solomon Ngo	Genesius Molto
Manila MLB	Manila	2025 Governor's Cup	Paco Arena	1,000	Mark Guteza	Harmz Hui
Nueva Ecija Granary Buffalos	San Leonardo, Nueva Ecija	2024 President's Cup	Nagano Gym	N/A	Hon. Aurelio Umali, Hon. Emmanuel Antonio Umali, Gil Raymond Umali	Sherwin Allado
Pangasinan Asinderos	Rosales, Pangasinan	2025 President's Cup	Robert B. Estrella Memorial Stadium	4,000	Hon. Patrick Caramat / William Cezar	Chris Calaguio
Quezon City Titans	Quezon City	2026 Governor's Cup	OLFU Gymnasium, Lagro, Quezon City	N/A	Paul Bayog	Albert Olaya
Quezon Starhorse	Lucena, Quezon	2026 Governor's Cup	Lucena City Convention Center	4,000	Vincent Victor Reyes Jr.	Melki Villanueva
Taguig City Generals	Taguig	2018	Cong. Jun Duenas Gymnasium; West Rembo Sports Complex	2,000; N/A	Hon. Lani Cayetano	Bing Victoria
Tikas Kapampangan	San Fernando; Angeles City; Bacolor	2024 President's Cup	Bren Z. Guiao Convention Center; AUF Sports and Cultural Center; Dr. Ernesto T. Nicdao Sports Center; FEU Pampanga Gymnasium	3,000; 2,000; 2,000; 1,000	Aya Gopez	Jeff Chan
Zamboanga Valientes	Zamboanga City	2019	None	None	Junnie Navarro	RJ Argamino

== Previous teams ==
Team	Locality	Arena	Capacity	First season	Last season
Biñan Tatak Gel	Biñan, Laguna	Alonte Sports Arena	6,500	2023 President's Cup	2023 Chairman's Cup
Bulacan Starks - McDavid	Bulacan	Malolos Sports and Convention Center; STI College Malolos Gym	2,000; 1,000	2019	2019
Bulacan Makabayan	Bulacan	Baliwag Star Arena	5,000	2018	2018
Cagayan Valley Water Buffalos	Cagayan Valley	none	none	2022 President's Cup	2022 President's Cup
Cavite Ballers	Cavite	De La Salle University - Dasmariñas Ugnayang La Salle Gym & Animo Center; Philippine Christian University - Dasmariñas Gym	2,000; 3,000	2018	2019-20 President's Cup
Damayang Filipino Bulacan Stars	Bulacan	Bulacan Capitol Gymnasium	5,000	2021	2023 President's Cup
FSD Makati Defenders	Makati	none	none	2022 President's Cup	2022 President's Cup
Imus Bandila	Imus, Cavite	Imus Sports Complex	1,000	2019	2019
Iriga City Oragons	Iriga, Camarines Sur	Jesse M. Robredo Coliseum	~12,000	2019	2019
La Union Paower	La Union	San Juan Gymnasium (La Union)	N/A	2019-20 President's Cup; 2022 Chairman's Cup (Rejoined)	2022 Chairman's Cup
Laguna Kings	Laguna	none	none	2022 Chairman's Cup	2022 Chairman's Cup
Laguna Pistons	Laguna	Santa Rosa Sports Complex	5,700	2018	2022 President's Cup
Las Piñas Lodis	Las Piñas	none	none	2022 President's Cup	2022 President's Cup
Las Piñas Oil Machine	Las Piñas	none	none	2022 Chairman's Cup	2022 Chairman's Cup
Lifenet Caloocan Executives	Caloocan	none	none	2019-20 President's Cup	2019-20 President's Cup
Luid Kapampangan	Pampanga	AUF Sports and Cultural Center; Colegio De Sebastian Gymnasium	2,000; 1,400	2023 President's Cup	2023 President's Cup
Makati Circus Music Festival	Makati	Makati Coliseum	12,000	2023 Chairman's Cup	2023 Chairman's Cup
Marikina Best Shoemakers	Marikina	Marikina Sports Center	7,000	2018; 2019-20 President's Cup (Rejoined)	2018 (Marikina Shoemakers); 2019-20 President's Cup
Mindoro Tamaraws Disiplinados	Mindoro	none	none	2021 Chairman's Cup	2021 Chairman's Cup
Muntinlupa Chiefs	Muntinlupa	none	none	2023 Chairman's Cup	2023 Chairman's Cup
Muntinlupa Constructicons	Muntinlupa	none	none	2022 Chairman's Cup	2022 Chairman's Cup
Muntinlupa Water Warriors	Muntinlupa	none	none	2021 Chairman's Cup	2023 President's Cup (as Muntinlupa)
Narvacan Panthers	Narvacan	none	none	2022 President's Cup	2022 President's Cup
Nikkelham Valenzuela Workhorse	Valenzuela	WES Arena	2,000	2024 President's Cup	2024 President's Cup
Nueva Ecija Bespren	Nueva Ecija	San Leonardo Sports Gym	5,000	2018 (Go Bespren); 2019-20 President's Cup	2018 (Go Bespren); 2019-20 President's Cup
Nueva Ecija Rice Makers	Nueva Ecija	San Leonardo Sports Gym	5,000	2019	2019
One Cainta Titans	Cainta, Rizal	One Arena	N/A	2019	2019
Parañaque Aces	Parañaque	none	none	2018	2022 President's Cup
Paranaque Smile 360	Paranaque	San Dionisio Gymnasium; Olivarez College Coliseum	1,000; 3,500	2024 President's Cup	2024 President's Cup
Pasig El Pirata - Jekasa Sportswear	Pasig	none	none	2019-20 President's Cup	2019-20 President's Cup
Rizal Nationals	Rizal	Antipolo Sports Hub	900	2018	2019 (only 2 games)
Pampanga Delta	Pampanga	Bren Z. Guiao Convention Center	3,000	2019	2022 Chairman's Cup
Pasig Rios - Gameville	Pasig	MetroAsia Arena	N/A	2019	2019
Santa Rosa Lions	Santa Rosa, Laguna	Santa Rosa Sports Complex	5,700	2022 President's Cup	2023 President's Cup
Sulong Zambales @ Batang Gapo	Subic, Zambales	Subic Sports Complex	1,000	2024 President's Cup	2024 President's Cup
Quezon Barons	Quezon	none	none	2021 Chairman's Cup	2022 President's Cup
Quezon City All-Stars	Quezon City	none	none	2022 Chairman's Cup	2022 Chairman's Cup
Quezon City Defenders	Quezon City	Philadelphia High School Gym; Pace Academy Gym; AFP Wellness Center	N/A	2019-20 President's Cup	2019-20 President's Cup
Quezon City Rising Stars	Quezon City	N/A	N/A	2018	2019
STAN District 4 Spartans	Quezon	none	none	2021 Chairman's Cup	2021 Chairman's Cup
Zambales Converge Fiber X-Men	Zambales	Botolan People's Plaza	1,000	2019	2019
Zambales Eruption	Zambales	none	none	2023 Chairman's Cup	2023 Chairman's Cup
Zamboanga Valientes	Zamboanga Peninsula	none	none	2019	2021 Chairman's Cup
Zambales Constructicons	Zambales	none	none	2025 Governor's Cup	2025 President's Cup
Bacoor - Maximus Premium Feeds	Bacoor, Cavite	none	none	2025 President's Cup	2025 President's Cup
Quezon City Enforcers	Quezon City	SB Park; Belarmino Sports Complex	N/A	2025 Governor's Cup	2025 President's Cup
Santa Rosa Eridanus	Santa Rosa, Laguna	Dominican College Gymnasium	N/A	2023 Chairman's Cup; 2025 President's Cup	2023 Chairman's Cup; 2025 President's Cup

=== NBL Youth teams ===
10u Teams	12u Teams	14u Teams	16u Teams	18u Teams	21u Teams
Don Bosco JBC - Tarlac	Hustle Grind - Tarlac	Cob Sports - Tarlac	Hicming Hawks - Catanduanes	Agimat - Cavite South	LNU Dukes - Pangasinan
Team Cali Calabanga - Camarines Sur	Team Cali Calabanga - Camarines Sur	Adee's Place - Camarines Sur	Agimat - Cavite South	Arriba Iriga - Camarines Sur	Mambulao Jerseyland - Camarines Norte
Samahang Bangadz - Pangasinan	Kings Basketball - Camarines Norte	Green Mussels - Camarines Norte	Annunciation Panthers - Sorsogon	Hermanos All-Star - Camarines Sur	Acetown Valenzuela
Jump Point Hustle - Camarines Sur	Coach Soc Basketball - Region 2	Jewelitas - Camarines Norte	Emeralds - Laguna District 1	Imus AJAA Arsenal - Cavite North	Worldstar Lions - Region 2
—N/a	YSSY Clean - Quezon Province	Pade Pade Soven - Camarines Sur	Team Bagyo - Ilocos Sur	Casa - Laguna District 1	Boss Maeng - Cavite South
—N/a	SBT RF Flores - Pangasinan	Asingan - Pangasinan	Coach Christian Camp - Region 2	Pilar - Sorsogon	Pangasinan Ang Galing
—N/a	Don Bosco Design - Makati	Maxon Cavaliers - NCR	Basista - Pangasinan	Under Dog - Region 2	—N/a
—N/a	DJ Quality Cars - NCR	Pirates Ocean View - Catanduanes	Epic Eastprint - NCR	Rock & Fortress - Cavite North	—N/a
—N/a	Kolokoys Basketball - Quezon Province	Kolokoys Basketball - Quezon Province	Pangasinan Ang Galing	Binmaley - Pangasinan	—N/a
—N/a	Under Dog - Region 2	Coach K - Region 2	—N/a	LNU Dukes - Pangasinan	—N/a
—N/a	Raz V - Catanduanes	Silang Banaba - Cavite South	—N/a	White Oasis - Camarines Norte	—N/a
—N/a	San Juan Basketball - Sorsogon	Tagaytay Pride - Cavite South	—N/a	Narvacan - Ilocos Sur	—N/a
—N/a	Tagaytay Pride - Cavite South	Fresh Ballers Bulan - Sorsogon	—N/a	—N/a	—N/a
—N/a	Trishot Basketball - Camarines Sur	YSSY Clean - Quezon Province	—N/a	—N/a	—N/a
—N/a	—N/a	Own Style - Albay	—N/a	—N/a	—N/a
—N/a	—N/a	Pangasinan Athletics	—N/a	—N/a	—N/a

== List of champions ==
Season / tournament	Champion	Series	Runner-up	Season MVP / Top performer	Team
2018	Parañaque Aces	2–1	Dasmariñas Ballers	John Cantimbuhan	Dasmariñas Ballers
2019	Taguig Generals	2–0	Pampanga Delta	Shinichi Manacsa	Laguna Pistons
2019–20 President's Cup	Converge Pampanga Delta	3–1	La Union PAOwer	CJ Gania	Converge Pampanga Delta
2021 Chairman's Cup	Pampanga Delta (2)	2–0	La Union PAOwer	Biboy Enguio	Muntinlupa Water Warriors
2022 President's Cup	Pampanga Delta (3)	2–0	Bulacan DF Republicans	Joseph Celso	Bulacan DF Republicans
2022 Chairman's Cup	Taguig Generals (2)	2–0	La Union PAOwer	Jap Pambid	La Union PAOwer
2023 President's Cup	Taguig Generals (3)	3–0	Luid Kapampangan	Lhancer Khan	Luid Kapampangan
2023 Chairman's Cup	Taguig Generals (4)	3–0	CamSur Express	Lerry John Mayo	Taguig Generals
2024 President's Cup	Taguig Generals (5)	3–2	CamSur Express	Mike Sampurna	Taguig Generals
2025 Governor's Cup	Tikas Kapampangan	3–2	Taguig Generals	Lerry John Mayo	Taguig Generals
2025 President's Cup	CamSur Express	3–2	Tikas Kapampangan	Lerry John Mayo	Taguig Generals
2026 Governor's Cup	Tikas Kapampangan (2)	3–1	Pangasinan Asinderos	Lloyd Borbe	CamSur Express
2026–27 President's Cup					

== NBL Youth champions ==
Season / tournament	Champion	Score	Runner-up	Season MVP / Top performer	Team
2019 12U	Dasmarinas Monarchs	64–57	Pampanga Jr. Delta	N/A	N/A
2019 17U	Pampanga Jr. Delta	75–64	Dasmarinas Monarchs	N/A	N/A
2022 14U	Pampanga Jr. Delta	69–43	Emeralds Academy	N/A	N/A
2022 16U 1st Conference	United Ballers	76–75	Pampanga Jr. Delta	N/A	N/A
2022 16U 2nd Conference	Emeralds Academy	64–62	Epson EDSCI Green Knights	N/A	N/A
2022 19U 1st Conference	Pampanga Jr. Delta	85–70	Caloocan Yengskivel	N/A	N/A
2022 19U 2nd Conference	Caloocan Yengskivel	93–83	Montalban	N/A	N/A
2023 10U (Inaugural Tournament – NBL Youth 3rd Conference)	Quezon City Troodons	53–28	Jr. KBA Luid Kapampangan	Crixus Quijano	Infinite Basketball
2023 12U (1st Tournament – NBL Youth 2nd Conference)	Jr. KBA Luid Kapampangan	72–60	Hotshots Basketball	Samuel Esomchi	Jr. Muntinlupa
2023 12U (2nd Tournament – NBL Youth 3rd Conference)	Jr. KBA Luid Kapampangan	74–66	Lukkas Barber's	Peter Sebastian Ibe	Jr. KBA Luid Kapampangan
2023 14U 1st Conference	Luid ECP KGM Basic	109–107	Emeralds Academy	John Denver Sison	Luid ECP KGM Basic
2023 14U 2nd Conference	Jr. Muntinlupa	96–90	Jr. KBA Luid Kapampangan	Jhelo Lumague	Hotshots Basketball
2023 14U 3rd Conference	Hotshots Basketball	103–72	Infinite Basketball	Cael Barja	Hotshots Basketball
2023 16U 1st Conference	Microsmith Elite	84–52	McMafie Bruins	Jhon Ken Atienza	Microsmith Elite
2023 16U 2nd Conference	JILCF Red Arc	90–87	EZ Jersey Bruins	Erlan John Getigan	Yengskivel
2023 16U 3rd Conference	Alab Knights	59–56	JILCF Red Arc	Erlan John Getigan	Yengskivel JBZ Zone 14
2023 19U 1st Conference	NAPPCO EZ Jersey Bruins	86–78	JILCF Red Arc	Russell Ogana	JILCF Red Arc
2023 19U 2nd Conference	JILCF Red Arc	72–62	TGC Aces	Patrick Rimbao	San Ignacio Basketball
2023 19U 3rd Conference	TGC Aces	100–99	Yengskivel JBZ Zone 14	Matthew Toledo & Alan Gammuac	TGC Aces
2023 21U 1st Conference	JRU Circus Music Festival	90–72	Luid Red Rose RAA	Karl Bench De Jesus	JRU Circus Music Festival
2023 21U 2nd Conference	La Union PAOwer Hoopers	78–74	Quezon City Simos	Jessie Boy Pineda	La Union PAOwer Hoopers
2023 21U 3rd Conference	NKT Raging Boyz	97–91	VS Meycauayan	Rhovin Fontanilla	La Union PAOwer Hoopers
2025 10U National	Jump Point Hustle	40–37	Don Bosco JBC	Juan Carlos Rosero	Jump Point Hustle
2025 12U National	SBT RF Flores	70–60	DJ Quality Cars	Carl Jefferson Perez	SBT RF Flores
2025 14U National	Cob Sports	62–55	YSSY Clean	Mark Raven Cuenca	Cob Sports
2025 16U National	Annunciation Panthers	68–63	Team Bagyo Ilocos Sur	Allen Jared Ballador	Annunciation Panthers
2025 18U National	LNU Dukes	99–95	Binmaley	Kent Gabrielle Razon	LNU Dukes
2025 21U National	LNU Dukes	forfeit	Acetown Valenzuela	none	none

== Official broadcasters ==
TAP Sports & Premier Sports 2 is the official broadcaster of the NBL Games. Games are also livestreamed via the league's official Facebook and YouTube accounts.

The games were aired internationally via GMA Pinoy TV and streamed on the Net 25 Facebook page during seasons 2 and 3.

== See also ==
- Women's National Basketball League (Philippines)
