= List of MPBL seasons =

The Maharlika Pilipinas Basketball League (MPBL) is a professional basketball league in the Philippines. Since its establishment in 2017, the league has played through six seasons and is currently running its seventh season featuring 30 teams. Initially an amateur league, it gained professional status in December 2021.

== List of seasons ==
Regular season			Playoffs			Finals		No. of teams	No. of games	Notes	Ref.
Year	Top seed	Record	Year	North champion	South champion	Year	Champion	No. of teams	No. of games	Notes	Ref.
2018; Rajah Cup	Batangas City Athletics	8–1 (.889)	2018	—N/a (Note: The 2018 season had no division alignment, thus there were no division champions.)		2018	Batangas City Athletics	10	9	Inaugural season; started with 10 teams	
2018–19; Datu Cup	Bataan Risers	23–2 (.920)	2019	San Juan Knights	Davao Occidental Tigers	2019	San Juan Knights	26	25	16 expansion teams joined	
2019–20; Lakan Season	San Juan Knights (Note: The San Juan Knights and Davao Occidental Tigers tied for best record in the 2019–20 season. San Juan won the head-to-head matchup, thus winning the tiebreaker.)	26–4 (.867)	2020–21	San Juan Knights	Davao Occidental Tigers	2021	Davao Occidental Tigers	31	30 (Note: The Navotas–Rizal game was not resumed for player safety. The game was later cancelled, thus both teams only played 29 games.)	6 expansion teams joined; 1 team departed	
2020–21	Season cancelled (Note: The 2020–21 season, originally scheduled for June 12, 2020, was cancelled due to the COVID-19 pandemic.)										
2022	Nueva Ecija Rice Vanguards	21–0 (1.000)	2022	Nueva Ecija Rice Vanguards	Zamboanga Family's Brand Sardines	2022	Nueva Ecija Rice Vanguards	22	21	9 teams departed	
2023	Pampanga Giant Lanterns	26–2 (.929)	2023	Pampanga Giant Lanterns	Bacoor City Strikers	2023	Pampanga Giant Lanterns	29	28 (Note: The Laguna–Manila game was postponed due to volcanic smog. It was later cancelled, thus both teams only played 27 games.)	2 expansion teams joined; 5 teams returned	
2024	San Juan Knights (Note: The San Juan Knights and Pampanga Giant Lanterns tied for best record in the 2024 season. San Juan won the head-to-head matchup, thus winning the tiebreaker.)	26–2 (.929)	2024	Pampanga Giant Lanterns	Quezon Huskers	2024	Pampanga Giant Lanterns	29 (Note: The 2024 season initially featured 30 competing teams. One expansion team, the Tarlac United Force, was pulled out by the league due to the team's failure to comply with financial obligations.)	28	3 expansion teams joined; 1 team returned; 3 teams departed; 1 team withdrew	
2025	Abra Weavers	28–1 (.966)	2025	Abra Weavers	Quezon Huskers	2025	Abra Weavers	30	29	1 expansion team joined; 3 teams returned; 3 teams departed	
