= 2024 Pampanga Giant Lanterns season =

Fifth season of the franchise in the MPBL

- MPBL champions
- Division champions
- Head coach: Dennis Pineda (de facto); Frederick Dimatulac (acting)
- Arena(s): Bren Z. Guiao Convention Center; AUF Sports and Cultural Center

Results
- Record: 26–2 (.929)
- Place: Division: 2nd (North)
- Playoff finish: MPBL champions (won vs. Quezon, 3–0)

Pampanga Giant Lanterns seasons

The 2024 Pampanga Giant Lanterns season was the fifth season of the Pampanga-based franchise in the Maharlika Pilipinas Basketball League (MPBL) and their third season in San Fernando.

The Giant Lanterns entered this season as defending champions having beaten the Bacoor City Strikers in the 2023 MPBL finals. The team kept its star players in Justine Baltazar, Encho Serrano, and Archie Concepcion. After winning the 2024 Preseason Invitational, the team shockingly lost the first game of its title defense to the Rizal Golden Coolers. The team then went on a 23-game winning streak that lasted from April 15 to August 26, giving them the longest regular season winning streak in league history. PGL finished the regular season tied for the best regular season record at 26–2, once again tying the record for most regular season wins. The team entered as the North Division's second seed, only behind the San Juan Knights who gave the Giant Lanterns their only other loss on August 30.

They continued their winning prowess in the playoffs, sweeping the expansion Abra Weavers and their region rival Nueva Ecija Rice Vanguards before once again taking on San Juan in the division finals. After sweeping San Juan in two games, they faced off against the Quezon Huskers in the 2024 MPBL finals. Their dominant form throughout the season carried on, as they swept the Huskers in three games to become the league's first back-to-back champions, doing so at home.

The team played most of their home games this season at Bren Z. Guiao Convention Center, with one home game played at their previous home, AUF Sports and Cultural Center in Angeles City.

== Roster ==
2024 Pampanga Giant Lanterns roster
Players

Pos.	No.	Name	Height	Weight	DOB	From
G/F	2	Archie Concepcion (HG)	6 ft 2 in (1.88 m)	189 lb (86 kg)		Arellano
G	3	Joe Gomez de Liaño	6 ft 2 in (1.88 m)
F	6	Wilson Baltazar (HG)	6 ft 3 in (1.91 m)
F/C	8	Jhaymo Eguilos	6 ft 6 in (1.98 m)	190 lb (86 kg)	1986–08–27	Far Eastern
G	11	MJ Garcia (HG)	6 ft 0 in (1.83 m)			SPCF
G	13	Kurt Reyson	5 ft 10 in (1.78 m)			Letran
G/F	15	Rence Luis Alcoriza	6 ft 0 in (1.83 m)			Arellano
G/F	18	Encho Serrano (HG)	6 ft 0 in (1.83 m)	176 lb (80 kg)	1999–09–18	De La Salle
F/C	19	Justine Baltazar (HG)	6 ft 8 in (2.03 m)	250 lb (113 kg)	1997–02–19	De La Salle
F	21	Martin Gozum (HG)	6 ft 2 in (1.88 m)
C	22	Ronan Santos (HG)	6 ft 7 in (2.01 m)			Arellano
C	25	Matt De Leon (HG)	6 ft 7 in (2.01 m)			Arellano
F	26	Lervin Flores	6 ft 5 in (1.96 m)	185 lb (84 kg)	1992–09–26	Arellano
F	29	Brandon Ramirez (HG)	6 ft 5 in (1.96 m)
G	30	Raymond Binuya (HG)	5 ft 8 in (1.73 m)			San Sebastian
G	74	Jeff Viernes	5 ft 7 in (1.70 m)	143 lb (65 kg)	1989–05–18	St. Clare

Coaches

Head coach

- Dennis Pineda (de facto)
- Frederic Dimatulac (acting)

Assistant coach(es)

- Manuel Luis Marquez
- Billy Bansil
- Jordan Viray
- Camille Istle Santos
- Jay Sierra

Legend

- (HG) Homegrown
- (FF) Filipino-foreigner
- (SGL) Special Guest Licensee
- (RS) Reserve player
- Injured

- Roster – via Genius Sports

== Preseason ==
Pampanga was one of eight teams that took part in the 2024 MPBL Preseason Invitational. In their first appearance in the preseason tournament, Pampanga won every game on their way to winning the Invitational title, where they beat the South Cotabato Warriors in the final game,

=== Schedule ===
2024 Pampanga Giant Lanterns Preseason Invitational schedule Total: 5–0
Stage	Game	Date	Opponent	Score	Location	Record	Recap
Group stage	1	February 22	Quezon City	W 73–68	Lagao Gymnasium	1–0	Recap
Group stage	2	February 23	Valenzuela	W 103–80	Lagao Gymnasium	2–0	Recap
Group stage	3	February 24	GenSan Bulalakaw	W 109–75	Lagao Gymnasium	3–0	Recap
Playoffs	SF	February 25	Batangas City	W 78–59	Lagao Gymnasium	4–0	Recap
Playoffs	F	February 27	South Cotabato	W 93–75	Lagao Gymnasium	5–0	Recap
Source: Schedule

== Regular season ==
=== Standings ===
Pos	Team	Pld	W	L	GB
1	San Juan Knights	28	26 (Note: San Juan wins tiebreaker over Pampanga based on head-to-head record.)	2	—
2	Pampanga Giant Lanterns	28	26	2	—
3	Nueva Ecija Rice Vanguards	28	24	4	2
4	Manila SV Batang Sampaloc	28	20	8	6
5	Caloocan Batang Kankaloo	28	19	9	7

Source: Standings
Rules for classification: 1) Wins; 2a) If two teams are tied, head-to-head match-up; 2b) If three or more teams are tied, head-to-head point quotient; 3) overall point quotient; 4) coin toss.

=== Schedule ===
2024 Pampanga Giant Lanterns regular season schedule Total: 26–2 (Home: 12–0; Road: 11–2; Neutral: 3–0)
Game	Date	Opponent	Score	Location	Record	Recap
1	April 9	Rizal	L 71–78	Villar Coliseum ^{(N)}	0–1	Recap
2	April 15	Marikina	W 85–86	Ynares Center ^{(N)}	1–1	Recap
3	April 22	Mindoro	W 96–72	Alonte Sports Arena ^{(N)}	2–1	Recap
4	April 26	Bicolandia	W 128–93	Alonte Sports Arena ^{(N)}	3–1	Recap
5	May 2	Quezon City	W 63–44	Bren Z. Guiao Convention Center ^{(H)}	4–1	Recap
6	May 7	Muntinlupa	W 83–62	Bren Z. Guiao Convention Center ^{(H)}	5–1	Recap
7	May 13	Bataan	W 86–75	Bren Z. Guiao Convention Center ^{(H)}	6–1	Recap
8	May 20	Pasay	W 70–65	Bren Z. Guiao Convention Center ^{(H)}	7–1	Recap
9	May 27	Parañaque	W 77–59	Bren Z. Guiao Convention Center ^{(H)}	8–1	Recap
10	June 1	Sarangani	W 109–68	Bren Z. Guiao Convention Center ^{(H)}	9–1	Recap
11	June 6	Negros	W 104–81	Alonte Sports Arena ^{(N)}	10–1	Recap
12	June 12	Davao Occidental	W 81–47	Bren Z. Guiao Convention Center ^{(H)}	11–1	Recap
13	June 18	Valenzuela	W 85–56	Bren Z. Guiao Convention Center ^{(H)}	12–1	Recap
14	June 22	Bulacan	W 124–81	Calasiao Sports Complex ^{(N)}	13–1	Recap
15	June 29	Nueva Ecija	W 91–85	Nueva Ecija Coliseum ^{(A)}	14–1	Recap
16	July 4	Pangasinan	W 74–50	Bren Z. Guiao Convention Center ^{(H)}	15–1	Recap
17	July 9	Caloocan	W 76–60	Caloocan Sports Complex ^{(A)}	16–1	Recap
18	July 16	Biñan	W 91–74	Alonte Sports Arena ^{(A)}	17–1	Recap
19	July 22	Batangas City	W 88–62	Bren Z. Guiao Convention Center ^{(H)}	18–1	Recap
20	July 29	Zamboanga	W 82–79	Filoil EcoOil Centre ^{(N)}	19–1	Recap
21	August 6	Imus	W 136–75	San Andres Sports Complex ^{(N)}	20–1	Recap
22	August 12	South Cotabato	W 83–75	Filoil EcoOil Centre ^{(N)}	21–1	Recap
23	August 16	Iloilo	W 88–49	Bren Z. Guiao Convention Center ^{(H)}	22–1	Recap
24	August 26	Manila	W 92–63	Filoil EcoOil Centre ^{(N)}	23–1	Recap
25	August 30	San Juan	L 82–86	Cuneta Astrodome ^{(N)}	23–2	Recap
26	September 3	Bacolod	W 143–94	Olivarez College ^{(N)}	24–2	Recap
27	September 10	Abra	W 88–79	FPJ Arena ^{(N)}	25–2	Recap
28	September 14	Quezon	W 75–69	AUF Sports and Cultural Center ^{(H)}	26–2	Recap
Source: Schedule

== Playoffs ==
=== Schedule ===
2024 Pampanga Giant Lanterns playoff schedule Total: 9–0 (Home: 4–0; Road: 1–0; Neutral: 4–0)
Round	Game	Date	Opponent	Score	Location	Series	Recap
Division quarterfinals	1	October 8	Abra	W 79–64	Bren Z. Guiao Convention Center ^{(H)}	1–0	Recap
Division quarterfinals	2	October 16	Abra	W 66–65	Nueva Ecija Coliseum ^{(N)}	2–0	Recap
Division semifinals	1	October 26	Nueva Ecija	W 76–73	Filoil EcoOil Centre ^{(N)}	1–0	Recap
Division semifinals	2	October 30	Nueva Ecija	W 83–80	Bren Z. Guiao Convention Center ^{(H)}	2–0	Recap
Division finals	1	November 8	San Juan	W 91–84	Filoil EcoOil Centre ^{(A)}	1–0	Recap
Division finals	2	November 11	San Juan	W 81–73	Bren Z. Guiao Convention Center ^{(H)}	2–0	Recap
National finals	1	December 1	Quezon	W 88–71	(United Arab Emirates) Rashid bin Hamdan Indoor Hall ^{(N)}	1–0	Recap
National finals	2	December 3	Quezon	W 79–60	(United Arab Emirates) Rashid bin Hamdan Indoor Hall ^{(N)}	2–0	Recap
National finals	3	December 7	Quezon	W 65–61	Bren Z. Guiao Convention Center ^{(H)}	3–0	Recap
Source: Schedule
