= 2023 GenSan Warriors season =

Fourth season of the franchise in the MPBL

- Arena(s): Lagao Gymnasium (Preseason Invitational only)

Results
- Record: 21–7 (.750)
- Place: Division: 3rd (South)
- Playoff finish: Division semifinals (lost vs. Batangas City, 1–2)

GenSan Warriors seasons

The 2023 GenSan Warriors season was the fourth season of the franchise in the Maharlika Pilipinas Basketball League (MPBL).

Despite continuous improvement by the team, it has yet to get past the division quarterfinals following their loss to Bacolod last season. Following the arrivals of former MPBL Most Valuable Player John Wilson and reigning Rookie of the Year Kyt Jimenez, the Warriors once again improved with not just a 21–7 record but also claiming a top-three seed for the first time.

In the division quarterfinals, General Santos faced against the Muntinlupa Cagers. The series ended up reaching a third game, which GenSan would win, 85–78, getting their first ever playoff series win. The Warriors' division semifinals series against the Batangas City Embassy Chill also ended up going the full length, but this time, GenSan would fall to Batangas City, ending their season.

This is the first season in which the team didn't play any home games during the regular season or playoffs, although they were one of two home teams for this season's Preseason Invitational.

== Preseason ==
The GenSan Warriors were one of eight teams that took part in the 2023 MPBL Preseason Invitational at the Lagao Gymnasium in General Santos. It was the second Preseason Invitational appearance for the franchise. The Warriors failed to make the playoffs after finishing Group B in third place with a 1–3 record.

=== Schedule ===
2023 GenSan Warriors Preseason Invitational schedule
Stage	Game	Date	Opponent	Score	Location	Record	Recap
Group stage	1	February 21	Valenzuela	W 82–73	Lagao Gymnasium	1–0	
Group stage	2	February 22	Nueva Ecija	L 67–73	Lagao Gymnasium	1–1	
Group stage	3	February 24	Imus	L 61–78	Lagao Gymnasium	1–2	
Source: Schedule

== Regular season ==
=== Standings ===
Pos	Team	Pld	W	L	GB
1	Bacoor City Strikers	28	23	5	—
2	Batangas City Embassy Chill	28	22	6	1
3	GenSan Warriors	28	21	7	2
4	Zamboanga Family's Brand Sardines	28	20	8	3
5	Quezon Huskers	28	19	9	4

Source: Standings
Rules for classification: 1) Wins; 2a) If two teams are tied, head-to-head match-up; 2b) If three or more teams are tied, head-to-head point quotient; 3) overall point quotient; 4) coin toss.

=== Schedule ===
2023 GenSan Warriors season schedule
Game	Date	Opponent	Score	Location	Record	Recap
1	March 23	Mindoro	W 87–78	Baliwag Star Arena	1–0	
2	March 30	Negros	W 88–74	Santa Rosa Sports Complex	2–0	
3	April 13	Laguna	W 89–77	Bren Z. Guiao Convention Center	3–0	
4	April 20	Rizal	W 80–78	Cuneta Astrodome	4–0	
5	April 25	Marikina	W 85–80	Cuneta Astrodome	5–0	
6	May 2	Imus	W 68–64	Imus City Sports Complex	6–0	
7	May 8	Pampanga	L 81–83	Bren Z. Guiao Convention Center	6–1	
8	May 13	Makati	L 72–79	Quezon Convention Center	6–2	
9	May 22	Bulacan	W 87–69	Baliwag Star Arena	7–2	
10	May 26	Bacoor City	L 68–74	Filoil EcoOil Centre	7–3	
11	June 3	Pasig City	W 91–76	Quezon Convention Center	8–3	
12	June 10	Muntinlupa	L 60–67	Batangas City Coliseum	8–4	
13	June 19	Iloilo	W 86–84	Batangas City Coliseum	9–4	
14	June 23	Quezon	W 89–71	Baliwag Star Arena	10–4	
15	June 27	Parañaque	W 89–82	Ynares Sports Arena	11–4	
16	July 4	Caloocan	W 95–90	Sentrong Pangkabataan	12–4	
17	July 8	Pasay	W 89–55	Quezon Convention Center	13–4	
18	July 14	Bicol	W 121–80	Filoil EcoOil Centre	14–4	
19	July 20	San Juan	L 83–88	Filoil EcoOil Centre	14–5	
20	July 25	Quezon City	W 118–77	Ynares Center	15–5	
21	July 31	Zamboanga	W 74–71	Passi City Arena	16–5	
22	August 4	Valenzuela	W 109–86	Muntinlupa Sports Center	17–5	
23	August 11	Manila	W 82–70	Muntinlupa Sports Center	18–5	
24	August 16	Nueva Ecija	L 93–97	Caloocan Sports Complex	18–6	
25	August 19	Bacolod	W 87–70	Bataan People's Center	19–6	
26	September 14	Bataan	W 99–65	Bataan People's Center	20–6	
27	September 21	Sarangani	W 114–92	Nueva Ecija Coliseum	21–6	
28	September 28	Batangas City	L 58–75	Nueva Ecija Coliseum	21–7	
Source: Schedule

== Playoffs ==
=== Schedule ===
2023 GenSan Warriors playoff schedule
Round	Game	Date	Opponent	Score	Location	Series	Recap
Division quarterfinals	1	October 10	Muntinlupa	W 79–70	Batangas City Coliseum	1–0	Recap
Division quarterfinals	2	October 17	Muntinlupa	L 91–99	Strike Gymnasium	1–1	Recap
Division quarterfinals	3	October 24	Muntinlupa	W 85–78	Paco Arena	2–1	Recap
Division semifinals	1	October 28	Batangas City	L 75–81	Strike Gymnasium	0–1	Recap
Division semifinals	2	November 4	Batangas City	W 61–55	Batangas City Coliseum	1–1	Recap
Division semifinals	3	November 7	Batangas City	L 62–66	Batangas City Coliseum	1–2	Recap
Source: Schedule
