= Pampanga Giant Lanterns–San Juan Knights rivalry =

Filipino basketball rivalry

- Teams: Pampanga Giant Lanterns; San Juan Knights
- First meeting: June 20, 2018 (MPBL); San Juan 93, Pampanga 70
- Latest meeting: September 4, 2025 (MPBL); San Juan 73, Pampanga 68

Statistics
- Total meetings: 15
- All-time series: 8–7 (San Juan)
- Longest win streak: San Juan W6
- Current win streak: San Juan W1

Postseason history
- 2020 MPBL North Division semifinals: San Juan won, 2–0; 2023 Pilipinas Super League semifinals: Pampanga won, 2–0; 2023 MPBL North Division finals: Pampanga won, 2–0; 2024 MPBL North Division finals: Pampanga won, 2–0

The Pampanga Giant Lanterns and San Juan Knights both joined the Maharlika Pilipinas Basketball League (MPBL) as expansion teams for its 2018–19 season. The two teams have consistently faced off in the playoffs, particularly in the mid-2020s when they are battling spot in the finals of both the MPBL and the Pilipinas Super League (PSL). As of September 4, 2025, San Juan leads the all-time series, 8–7.

== History ==
=== 2018–2020: First meetings ===
Both teams first faced each other on June 20, 2018, which happened to be their first games as expansion teams. The then-named Pampanga Lanterns hosted the game at AUF Sports and Cultural Center in Angeles City, but San Juan beat the home team with a score of 93–70. It wouldn't be until the following season when both met in the playoffs for the first time. In the 2020–21 MPBL playoffs, San Juan swept the now-Giant Lanterns in the best-of-three series. Game 1 of that series also featured a game-winning layup made by Mike Ayonayon.

=== 2023–present: Fighting for contention ===
Entering their semifinals match-up in the 2023 PSL DUMPER Cup playoffs, San Juan has beaten Pampanga in all six of their meetings up to that point. In addition, San Juan came into the playoffs undefeated at 15–0 while Pampanga finished 10–5. On March 27, 2023, the Pampanga franchise finally reigned over the San Juan franchise on an 87–84 victory at the Filoil EcoOil Centre. They then went on to win game 2 at home at the Bren Z. Guiao Convention Center to advance to the finals and eventually win their first professional championship against the Davao Occidental Tigers.

Back in the MPBL, on September 30, the Giants Lanterns won their first regular season game against San Juan, a game that would lead to Pampanga's 26th win for the winningest season in league history, a record that is shared with multiple teams, including San Juan. The two teams then found themselves on familiar ground in that year's North Division finals with a trip to the championship series at stake. Pampanga would eventually sweep San Juan once again to claim their first North Division title before winning the championship altogether against the Bacoor City Strikers. Pampanga's five-game winning streak over San Juan came to an end in the following 2024 season after San Juan defeated Pampanga, 86–82, a game that also ended Pampanga's 23-game winning streak. Both teams are expected to meet again in the playoffs, where another division championship is on the line.

== Annual finishes ==
NOTE: Preseason games are not included.

League	Season	Pampanga Lanterns/Giant Lanterns/G Lanterns				San Juan Knights/Kings				Series
League	Season	W	L	PCT	Playoff finish	W	L	PCT	Playoff finish	Series
MPBL	2018–19	11	14	.440	Did not qualify	20	5	.800	Won national finals	SJ 1–0
MPBL	2019–20	21	9	.700	Lost division semifinals	26	4	.867	Lost national finals	SJ 3–0
MPBL	2022	14	7	.774	lost division semifinals	14	7	.667	Lost division finals	SJ 1–0
PSL	2022–23	10	5	.667	Won finals	15	0	1.000	Lost semifinals	PAM 2–1
MPBL	2023	26	2	.929	Won national finals	19	9	.679	Lost division finals	PAM 3–0
MPBL	2024	26	2	.929	Won national finals	26	2	.929	Lost division finals	PAM 2–1
MPBL	2025	21	8	.724	Lost division quarterfinals	26	3	.897	Lost division semifinals	SJ 1–0

== Game summaries ==
Legend
Pampanga win
San Juan win
**Bold** indicates home team

League	Type	Date	Winning team	Score	Losing team	Location	Recap
MPBL	Regular season	June 20, 2018	San Juan	93–70	**Pampanga**	AUF Sports and Cultural Center	Recap
MPBL	Regular season	September 17, 2019	**San Juan**	102–97	Pampanga	AUF Sports and Cultural Center	Recap
MPBL	Playoffs	February 28, 2020	**San Juan**	86–84	Pampanga	Filoil Flying V Centre	Recap
MPBL	Playoffs	March 4, 2020	San Juan	91–83	Pampanga	San Andres Sports Complex	Recap
MPBL	Regular season	October 8, 2022	San Juan	74–71	**Pampanga**	Bren Z. Guiao Convention Center	Recap
PSL	Regular season	February 16, 2023	**San Juan**	94–81	Pampanga	Filoil EcoOil Centre	Recap
PSL	Playoffs	March 27, 2023	Pampanga	87–84	**San Juan**	Filoil EcoOil Centre	Recap
PSL	Playoffs	March 30, 2023	**Pampanga**	79–72	San Juan	Bren Z. Guiao Convention Center	Recap
MPBL	Regular season	September 30, 2023	Pampanga	89–73	San Juan	Quezon Convention Center	Recap
MPBL	Playoffs	November 11, 2023	**Pampanga**	86–82	San Juan	Bren Z. Guiao Convention Center	Recap
MPBL	Playoffs	November 14, 2023	Pampanga	82–76	**San Juan**	Filoil EcoOil Centre	Recap
MPBL	Regular season	August 30, 2024	San Juan	86–82	Pampanga	Cuneta Astrodome	Recap
MPBL	Playoffs	November 8, 2024	Pampanga	91–84	**San Juan**	Filoil EcoOil Centre	Recap
MPBL	Playoffs	November 11, 2024	**Pampanga**	81–73	San Juan	Bren Z. Guiao Convention Center	Recap
MPBL	Regular season	September 4, 2025	San Juan	73–68	Pampanga	Caloocan Sports Complex	Recap

== See also ==
- Nueva Ecija Rice Vanguards–Pampanga Giant Lanterns rivalry
- Nueva Ecija Rice Vanguards–San Juan Knights rivalry
