= 2023 Nueva Ecija Rice Vanguards season =

Second season of the franchise in the MPBL

- Head coach: Jerson Cabiltes
- Arena(s): Nueva Ecija Coliseum

Results
- Record: 23–5 (.821)
- Place: Division: 2nd (North)
- Playoff finish: Division semifinals (lost vs. San Juan, 0–2)

Nueva Ecija Rice Vanguards seasons

The 2023 Nueva Ecija Rice Vanguards season was the third season of the franchise in the Maharlika Pilipinas Basketball League (MPBL).

Coming off a historic 2022 campaign that included the league's first regular season sweep, Nueva Ecija entered this season as the defending champions. They continued to show their winning prowess by starting with an 11-game winning streak before losing to Sarangani on their 12th game on June 3. On September 21, Nueva Ecija achieved their winningest season to date with their 22nd win over San Juan. They finished the season at second place in the North Division with a 23–5 record.

In the playoffs, Nueva Ecija swept the Pasay Voyagers in the division quarterfinals. In the division semifinals, however, Nueva Ecija would be swept by the sixth-seeded San Juan Knights.

The team played all of their home games at Nueva Ecija Coliseum in Palayan.

== Preseason ==
Nueva Ecija was one of eight teams that took part in the 2023 MPBL Preseason Invitational. For the second consecutive time, they would reach the finals against the Zamboanga Family's Brand Sardines, however would once again fall short of the Invitational title.

=== Schedule ===
2023 Nueva Ecija Rice Vanguards Preseason Invitational schedule
Stage	Game	Date	Opponent	Score	Location	Record	Recap
Group stage	1	February 21	Imus	W 88–78	Lagao Gymnasium	1–0	
Group stage	2	February 22	General Santos	W 73–67	Lagao Gymnasium	2–0	
Group stage	3	February 23	Valenzuela	W 94–64	Lagao Gymnasium	3–0	
Playoffs	SF	February 25	Sarangani	W 112–89	Lagao Gymnasium	4–0	
Playoffs	F	February 27	Zamboanga	L 80–88	Lagao Gymnasium	4–1	
Source: Schedule

== Regular season ==
=== Standings ===
Pos	Team	Pld	W	L	GB
1	Pampanga Giant Lanterns	28	26	2	—
2	Nueva Ecija Rice Vanguards	28	23	5	3
3	Makati OKBet Kings	28	21	7	5
4	Caloocan Batang Kankaloo	28	20	8	6
5	Pasig City MCW Sports	28	19 (Note: Pasig wins tiebreaker over San Juan based on head-to-head victory.)	9	7

Source: Standings
Rules for classification: 1) Wins; 2a) If two teams are tied, head-to-head match-up; 2b) If three or more teams are tied, head-to-head point quotient; 3) overall point quotient; 4) coin toss.

=== Schedule ===
2023 Nueva Ecija Rice Vanguards season schedule
Game	Date	Opponent	Score	Location	Record	Recap
1	March 13	Laguna	W 97–70	Baliwag Star Arena	1–0	
2	March 18	Bacolod	W 90–72	Bataan People's Center	2–0	
3	March 25	Bataan	W 72–69	Nueva Ecija Coliseum	3–0	
4	March 31	Rizal	W 87–70	Ynares Center	4–0	
5	April 14	Bulacan	W 76–67	Ynares Center	5–0	
6	April 21	Parañaque	W 91–74	Ynares Sports Arena	6–0	
7	April 29	Iloilo	W 80–74	Nueva Ecija Coliseum	7–0	
8	May 6	Marikina	W 88–86	Olivarez College	8–0	
9	May 11	Manila	W 107–98	San Andres Sports Complex	9–0	
10	May 19	Muntinlupa	W 71–67	Bren Z. Guiao Convention Center	10–0	
11	May 27	Imus	W 84–63	Imus City Sports Complex	11–0	
12	June 3	Sarangani	L 123–134	Quezon Convention Center	11–1	
13	June 9	Quezon City	W 95–53	Bren Z. Guiao Convention Center	12–1	
14	June 19	Batangas City	W 68–56	Batangas City Coliseum	13–1	
15	June 23	Negros	W 94–72	Baliwag Star Arena	14–1	
16	July 1	Pampanga	L 64–76	Bren Z. Guiao Convention Center	14–2	
17	July 6	Valenzuela	W 107–78	Baliwag Star Arena	15–2	
18	July 11	Mindoro	W 84–69	Strike Gymnasium	16–2	
19	July 17	Bacoor City	W 83–75	Nueva Ecija Coliseum	17–2	
20	July 24	Caloocan	W 67–60	Caloocan Sports Complex	18–2	
21	July 29	Makati	L 61–68	La Salle Coliseum	18–3	
22	August 3	Quezon	L 86–87	Quezon Convention Center	18–4	
23	August 8	Pasig City	W 69–65	Nueva Ecija Coliseum	19–4	
24	August 16	General Santos	W 97–93	Caloocan Sports Complex	20–4	
25	August 24	Bicol	W 129–86	Bren Z. Guiao Convention Center	21–4	
26	September 11	Zamboanga	L 65–67	Mayor Vitaliano D. Agan Coliseum	21–5	
27	September 21	San Juan	W 99–97	Nueva Ecija Coliseum	22–5	
28	September 28	Pasay	W 88–79	Nueva Ecija Coliseum	23–5	
Source: Schedule

== Playoffs ==
=== Schedule ===
2023 Nueva Ecija Rice Vanguards playoff schedule
Round	Game	Date	Opponent	Score	Location	Series	Recap
Division quarterfinals	1	October 9	Pasay	W 85–81	Nueva Ecija Coliseum	1–0	Recap
Division quarterfinals	2	October 16	Pasay	W 71–62	Ynares Sports Arena	2–0	Recap
Division semifinals	1	October 27	San Juan	L 82–86	Bren Z. Guiao Convention Center	0–1	Recap
Division semifinals	2	November 3	San Juan	L 80–88	Nueva Ecija Coliseum	0–2	Recap
Source: Schedule
