= James Kwekuteye =

Filipino-Canadian basketball player

No. 15 – San Juan Knights
- Position: Shooting guard
- League: MPBL

Personal information
- Born: August 15, 1998 (age 28)
- Listed height: 6 ft 2 in (1.88 m)
- Listed weight: 210 lb (95 kg)

Career information
- College: San Beda
- PBA draft: 2023: 2nd round, 20th overall pick
- Drafted by: Blackwater Bossing
- Playing career: 2023–present

Career history
- 2023: Zamboanga Valientes
- 2023: Bacoor City Strikers
- 2023–2025: Blackwater Bossing
- 2025: NorthPort Batang Pier
- 2025: Phoenix Fuel Masters
- 2026–present: San Juan Knights

Career highlights
- All-MPBL Second Team (2023); MPBL All-Star (2023)

James Canlas Kwekuteye (born August 15, 1998) is a Filipino-Canadian professional basketball player for the San Juan Knights of the Maharlika Pilipinas Basketball League (MPBL).

Kwekuteye played his college career with the San Beda Red Lions and turned professional in 2023 when he joined the Zamboanga Valientes for the 2023 ABL Invitational. Afterwards, he moved to the Bacoor City Strikers of the Maharlika Pilipinas Basketball League (MPBL), where he made the All-MPBL Second Team as well as an all-star appearance.

During the PBA season 48 draft, he was selected 20th overall by the Blackwater Bossing. In 2025, he was traded to the NorthPort Batang Pier, then later traded to the Phoenix Fuel Masters. In 2026, he was traded for a third time in one year to the Converge FiberXers.

== College career ==
Kwekuteye played for the San Beda Red Lions during his college career. He also played in the PBA D-League.

== Professional career ==
=== Zamboanga Valientes (2023) ===
After NCAA Season 98, Kwekuteye signed for the Zamboanga Valientes during the ASEAN Basketball League's 2023 Invitational tournament, forgoing his final year with San Beda. After signing with the team, he stated that he would remain "open" for a return to San Beda and that he is "testing the waters in the ABL".

=== Bacoor City Strikers (2023) ===
After his ABL stint, Kwekuteye joined the Bacoor City Strikers of the Maharlika Pilipinas Basketball League. He was selected to the All-MPBL Second Team after averaging 12.5 points, 5.3 rebounds, 2 assists, 1.7 steals, and 0.5 blocks per game, earning an appearance in the 2023 MPBL All-Star Game and helping his team in their run to the 2023 MPBL finals.

=== Blackwater Bossing (2023–2025) ===
Kwekuteye was selected 20th overall by the Blackwater Bossing of the Philippine Basketball Association during the season 48 draft.

=== NorthPort Batang Pier (2025) ===
On April 23, 2025, Blackwater traded Kwekuteye to the NorthPort Batang Pier in exchange for Abu Tratter.

=== Phoenix Fuel Masters (2025) ===
On October 2, 2025, Kwekuteye was traded to the Phoenix Fuel Masters in exchange for Ato Ular.

=== Converge FiberXers (2026) ===
On February 24, 2026, Kwekuteye was traded for a third time in a span of one year. Phoenix sent him to the Converge FiberXers in exchange for the rights to Tony Ynot.

== Career statistics ==
=== PBA ===
Legend
GP	Games played	MPG	Minutes per game	FG%	Field-goal percentage
3FG%	3-point field-goal percentage	4P%	4-point field-goal percentage	FT%	Free-throw percentage
RPG	Rebounds per game	APG	Assists per game	SPG	Steals per game
BPG	Blocks per game	PPG	Points per game	**127**	Career high

As of the end of 2024–25 season

=== Season-by-season averages ===
Year	Team	GP	MPG	FG%	3P%	4P%	FT%	RPG	APG	SPG	BPG	PPG
2023–24	Blackwater	15	**18.3**	**.370**	.222	—	**1.000**	1.9	**1.7**	.4	.1	**7.7**
2024–25	Blackwater	**32**	17.9	.369	**.347**	.000	.846	**2.1**	1.4	**.8**	**.2**	6.0
2024–25	NorthPort	**32**	17.9	.369	**.347**	.000	.846	**2.1**	1.4	**.8**	**.2**	6.0
Career		47	18.0	.369	.305	.000	.926	2.0	1.5	.7	.1	6.6

=== MPBL ===
Legend
GP	Games played	MPG	Minutes per game
FG%	Field-goal percentage	3P%	3-point field-goal percentage	FT%	Free-throw percentage
RPG	Rebounds per game	APG	Assists per game	SPG	Steals per game
BPG	Blocks per game	PPG	Points per game	**Bold**	Career high

As of the end of 2023 season

Year	Team	GP	GS	MPG	FG%	3P%	FT%	RPG	APG	SPG	BPG	PPG
2023	Bacoor City	33	27	26.1	.379	.294	.716	5.3	2.0	1.7	.6	12.5
