= 2023 Pampanga Giant Lanterns season =

Fourth season of the franchise in the MPBL

- MPBL champions
- Division champions
- Arena(s): Bren Z. Guiao Convention Center

Results
- Record: 26–2 (.929)
- Place: Division: 1st (North)
- Playoff finish: MPBL champions (won vs. Bacoor City, 3–0)

Pampanga Giant Lanterns seasons

The 2023 Pampanga Giant Lanterns season was the fourth season of the franchise in the Maharlika Pilipinas Basketball League (MPBL) and their second season in San Fernando.

With the arrivals of Justine Baltazar and Encho Serrano to the team, the team began the season with a 17-game winning streak, which was broken by Batangas City on July 13. The team suffered its only other loss against Makati on August 4, thus finishing the season with a 26–2 record, tying both San Juan and Davao Occidental from the 2019–20 season for most wins in a single regular season, a record that would be matched by Pampanga the following season.

The team continued its dominant prowess all throughout the playoffs, not losing a single game on their way to their first national finals appearance against the Bacoor City Strikers. In game 3, Pampanga were falling behind heading into the fourth quarter before taking the lead with three minutes remaining. Pampanga won their first MPBL championship and their second professional title.

The team played all of their home games this season at Bren Z. Guiao Convention Center.

== Roster ==
2023 Pampanga Giant Lanterns roster
Players

Pos.	No.	Name	Height	Weight	DOB	From
G	2	Archie Concepcion (HG)	6 ft 2 in (1.88 m)			Arellano
G	3	CJ Gania (HG)	6 ft 2 in (1.88 m)			DHVSU
F	4	Kevin Kyle Santos (SGL)	6 ft 7 in (2.01 m)			Letran
F	6	Louie Sangalang	6 ft 6 in (1.98 m)			Letran
F	7	JB Bahio	6 ft 6 in (1.98 m)			San Beda
G	8	Neil Tolentino (HG)	6 ft 1 in (1.85 m)			Arellano
G	9	Karl Sampang (HG)	6 ft 0 in (1.83 m)			Holy Angel
G	11	Michael Jeffrey Garcia (HG)	6 ft 0 in (1.83 m)			SPCF
G	13	Kurt Reyson (SGL)	5 ft 10 in (1.78 m)			Letran
F	14	Jayson Apolonio	6 ft 3 in (1.91 m)			DMMMSU
G	18	Encho Serrano (EP, HG)	6 ft 0 in (1.83 m)	176 lb (80 kg)	1999–09–18	De La Salle
F	19	Justine Baltazar (HG)	6 ft 8 in (2.03 m)	250 lb (113 kg)	1997–02–19	De La Salle
C	22	Ronan Santos (HG)	6 ft 7 in (2.01 m)			Arellano
C	25	Matt De Leon (HG)	6 ft 7 in (2.01 m)			Arellano
F	29	Arwind Santos (EP, HG)	6 ft 4 in (1.93 m)	175 lb (79 kg)	1981–06–10	Far Eastern
G	30	Raymond Binuya (C, HG)	5 ft 8 in (1.73 m)			San Sebastian
F	34	Mitchelle Maynes	6 ft 4 in (1.93 m)
F	43	Allen Liwag (SGL)	6 ft 7 in (2.01 m)			St. Benilde
G	77	John Loyd Clemente (HG)	6 ft 3 in (1.91 m)			National-U

Coaches

Head coach

- Dennis Pineda

Assistant coach(es)

- Hupmerdink Dimatulac

Legend

- (HG) Homegrown
- (FF) Filipino-foreigner
- (SGL) Special Guest Licensee
- (RS) Reserve player
- Injured

- Roster – via Genius Sports

== Regular season ==
=== Standings ===
Pos	Team	Pld	W	L	GB
1	Pampanga Giant Lanterns	28	26	2	—
2	Nueva Ecija Rice Vanguards	28	23	5	3
3	Makati OKBet Kings	28	21	7	5
4	Caloocan Batang Kankaloo	28	20	8	6
5	Pasig City MCW Sports	28	19 (Note: Pasig wins tiebreaker over San Juan based on head-to-head victory.)	9	7

Source: Standings
Rules for classification: 1) Wins; 2a) If two teams are tied, head-to-head match-up; 2b) If three or more teams are tied, head-to-head point quotient; 3) overall point quotient; 4) coin toss.

=== Schedule ===
2023 Pampanga Giant Lanterns season schedule
Game	Date	Opponent	Score	Location	Record	Recap
1	April 13	Negros	W 79–66	Bren Z. Guiao Convention Center	1–0	
2	April 20	Imus	W 93–72	Cuneta Astrodome	2–0	
3	April 27	Valenzuela	W 79–55	Bren Z. Guiao Convention Center	3–0	
4	May 2	Laguna	W 109–85	Imus City Sports Complex	4–0	
5	May 8	General Santos	W 83–81	Bren Z. Guiao Convention Center	5–0	
6	May 11	Bicol	W 132–87	San Andres Sports Complex	6–0	
7	May 15	Caloocan	W 76–68	Strike Gymnasium	7–0	
8	May 19	Marikina	W 83–75	Bren Z. Guiao Convention Center	8–0	
9	May 24	Quezon City	W 115–79	Cuneta Astrodome	9–0	
10	May 30	Bataan	W 74–72	Bataan People's Center	10–0	
11	June 5	Manila	W 91–63	Muntinlupa Sports Center	11–0	
12	June 9	Sarangani	W 99–92	Bren Z. Guiao Convention Center	12–0	
13	June 15	Pasig City	W 81–66	Bren Z. Guiao Convention Center	13–0	
14	June 20	Rizal	W 93–80	Filoil EcoOil Centre	14–0	
15	June 26	Pasay	W 108–89	Filoil EcoOil Centre	15–0	
16	July 1	Nueva Ecija	W 76–64	Bren Z. Guiao Convention Center	16–0	
17	July 6	Bulacan	W 121–88	Baliwag Star Arena	17–0	
18	July 13	Batangas City	L 92–95	Batangas State University	17–1	
19	July 18	Iloilo	W 93–66	Bren Z. Guiao Convention Center	18–1	
20	July 22	Bacoor City	W 78–70	Laguna Sports Complex	19–1	
21	July 28	Quezon	W 83–60	Cuenta Astrodome	20–1	
22	August 4	Makati	L 97–102	Muntinlupa Sports Center	20–2	
23	August 10	Parañaque	W 88–82	Bren Z. Guiao Convention Center	21–2	
24	August 16	Mindoro	W 91–70	Caloocan Sports Complex	22–2	
25	August 24	Zamboanga	W 77–71	Bren Z. Guiao Convention Center	23–2	
26	September 14	Bacolod	W 103–86	Bataan People's Center	24–2	
27	September 26	Muntinlupa	W 87–73	Bren Z. Guiao Convention Center	25–2	
28	September 30	San Juan	W 89–73	Quezon Convention Center	26–2	
Source: Schedule

== Playoffs ==
=== Schedule ===
2023 Pampanga Giant Lanterns playoff schedule
Round	Game	Date	Opponent	Score	Location	Series	Recap
Division Quarterfinals	1	October 6	Marikina	W 82–70	Bren Z. Guiao Convention Center	1–0	Recap
Division Quarterfinals	2	October 13	Marikina	W 81–61	Caloocan Sports Complex	2–0	Recap
Division Semifinals	1	October 27	Caloocan	W 74–63	Bren Z. Guiao Convention Center	1–0	Recap
Division Semifinals	2	November 3	Caloocan	W 93–77	Nueva Ecija Coliseum	2–0	Recap
Division Finals	1	November 11	San Juan	W 82–76	Bren Z. Guiao Convention Center	1–0	Recap
Division Finals	2	November 14	San Juan	W 71–58	Filoil EcoOil Centre	2–0	Recap
National Finals	1	November 25	Bacoor City	W 71–58	Bren Z. Guiao Convention Center	1–0	Recap
National Finals	2	November 28	Bacoor City	W 68–65	Bren Z. Guiao Convention Center	2–0	Recap
National Finals	3	December 2	Bacoor City	W 82–77	Strike Gymnasium	3–0	Recap
Source: Schedule
