= 2024 Zamboanga Master Sardines season =

Sixth season of the franchise in the MPBL

- Head coach: Louie Alas
- Arena(s): No home games scheduled

Results
- Record: 20–8 (.714)
- Place: Division: 4th (South)

Zamboanga Master Sardines seasons

The 2024 Zamboanga Master Sardines season is the fifth season of the franchise in the Maharlika Pilipinas Basketball League (MPBL).

Zamboanga enter this season coming off their winningest season to date after notching a 20–8 record before losing to the Bacoor City Strikers in the Division Semifinals.

Currently, no home games are scheduled for the Zamboanga Master Sardines.

== Roster ==
2024 Zamboanga Master Sardines roster
Players

Pos.	No.	Name	Height	Weight	DOB	From
F	1	Jason Strait	6 ft 4 in (1.93 m)
	2	Rey Joey Barcuma
G	3	Choi Ignacio (HG)	6 ft 1 in (1.85 m)			National-U
G	4	Robi Nayve	5 ft 11 in (1.80 m)			St. Benilde
G	6	Renzo Subido	5 ft 9 in (1.75 m)	135 lb (61 kg)	1996–02–17	UST
F	8	Rey Publico	6 ft 4 in (1.93 m)		1992–11–29	Letran
F	9	Ken Alas	6 ft 3 in (1.91 m)			San Beda
G	11	Jaycee Marcelino	5 ft 9 in (1.75 m)		1995–10–19	Lyceum
F	14	Jayson Apolonio	6 ft 3 in (1.91 m)			DMMMSU
F	16	Adrian Santos	6 ft 3 in (1.91 m)	200 lb (91 kg)	1992–04–18	UE
G	19	Jayvee Marcelino	5 ft 9 in (1.75 m)			Lyceum
C	22	Joseph Gabayni	6 ft 5 in (1.96 m)		1994–09–28	Lyceum
G	23	Rayzon Celestino (HG)	5 ft 11 in (1.80 m)
C	24	Mark Omega	6 ft 5 in (1.96 m)			UPHSD
G	25	Joseph Terso	5 ft 10 in (1.78 m)	162 lb (73 kg)	1990–05–18	National-U
F	28	Chito Jaime	6 ft 4 in (1.93 m)	200 lb (91 kg)	1983–10–21	AMA
F	31	Ralph Tansingco	6 ft 4 in (1.93 m)			Lyceum
C	41	Jayboy Solis	6 ft 5 in (1.96 m)			Olivarez
C	91	King Rodney Fuentes (HG)	6 ft 5 in (1.96 m)			Emilio Aguinaldo
G	99	John Mahari (HG)	6 ft 2 in (1.88 m)

Coaches

Head coach

- Louie Alas

Assistant coach(es)

- Arnold Contorno
- Gilbert Castillo
- Francis Allen
- Caesar Polhen

Legend

- (HG) Homegrown
- (FF) Filipino-foreigner
- (SGL) Special Guest Licensee
- (RS) Reserve player
- Injured

- Roster – via Genius Sports
Updated as of: April 6, 2024

== Regular season ==
=== Standings ===
Pos	Team	Pld	W	L	GB
2	Batangas City Tanduay Rum Masters	28	20 (Note: Batangas City (1.132), Biñan (0.950), and Zamboanga (0.931) are ranked based on head-to-head point quotient.)	8	1
3	Biñan Tatak Gel	28	20	8	1
4	Zamboanga Master Sardines	28	20	8	1
5	Parañaque Patriots	28	17 (Note: Parañaque wins tiebreaker over South Cotabato based on head-to-head record.)	11	4
6	South Cotabato Warriors	28	17	11	4

Source: Standings
Rules for classification: 1) Wins; 2a) If two teams are tied, head-to-head match-up; 2b) If three or more teams are tied, head-to-head point quotient; 3) overall point quotient; 4) coin toss.

=== Schedule ===
2024 Zamboanga Master Sardines season schedule
Game	Date	Opponent	Score	Location	Record	Recap
1	April 6	Valenzuela	W 82–76	Calasiao Sports Complex	1–0	Recap
2	April 11	Bicolandia	–	Filoil EcoOil Centre		
3	April 16	Mindoro	–	Cuneta Astrodome		
4	April 22	Negros	–	Alonte Sports Arena		
5	April 29	South Cotabato	–	San Andres Sports Complex		
6	May 4	Quezon	–	Quezon Convention Center		
7	May 10	Marikina	–	Caloocan Sports Complex		
8	May 16	Bacolod	–	Olivarez College		
9	May 22	Parañaque	–	Olivarez College		
10	May 28	Caloocan	–	Caloocan Sports Complex		
11						
12						
13						
14						
15						
16						
17						
18						
19						
20						
21						
22						
23						
24						
25						
26						
27						
28						
29						
Source: Schedule
