= 2024 Iloilo United Royals season =

Third season of the franchise in the MPBL

- Head coach: MC Abolucion
- Arena(s): No home games scheduled

Results
- Record: 11–17 (.393)
- Place: Division: 9th (South)

Iloilo United Royals seasons

The 2024 Iloilo United Royals season is the third season of the franchise in the Maharlika Pilipinas Basketball League (MPBL).

With the acquisitions of multiple collegiate players such as CJ Cansino and Mark Nonoy, Iloilo is looking to improve from a 12–16 campaign that saw them bring the first-seeded Bacoor City Strikers to a full three-game series.

Currently, no home games are scheduled for the Iloilo United Royals.

== Roster ==
2024 Iloilo United Royals roster
Players

Pos.	No.	Name	Height	Weight	DOB	From
G	1	Shaquille Imperial	5 ft 10 in (1.78 m)			Southwestern-U
G	3	Aaron Jeruta (HG)	5 ft 10 in (1.78 m)		1994–10–16	Centro Escolar
C	4	RV Berjay	6 ft 5 in (1.96 m)			Ateneo
G	5	JV Kapunan (HG)	5 ft 8 in (1.73 m)		1990–07–23
F	7	Jason Credo	6 ft 4 in (1.93 m)			Ateneo
F	8	Michael Jay Javelosa (HG)	6 ft 5 in (1.96 m)			Ateneo
F	9	CJ Catapusan	6 ft 3 in (1.91 m)			UP
G	11	Ry Aijer Dela Rosa (SGL)	5 ft 0 in (1.52 m)			José Rizal
G	12	Gwyne Matthew Capacio	6 ft 3 in (1.91 m)			Ateneo
G	13	Gab Gomez	6 ft 0 in (1.83 m)			Ateneo
G	14	Clint Doliguez	6 ft 1 in (1.85 m)	188 lb (85 kg)	1994–05–27	San Beda
F	21	Prince Etrata	5 ft 6 in (1.68 m)
G	24	Mark Nonoy (HG)	5 ft 8 in (1.73 m)			De La Salle
F	25	AJ Madrigal	6 ft 3 in (1.91 m)			UP
F	26	Omar Larupay (HG)	6 ft 2 in (1.88 m)			Lyceum
G	27	CJ Cansino	6 ft 2 in (1.88 m)		1999-10-27	UP
C	29	Jeffrey Ryan Ongteco	6 ft 5 in (1.96 m)			St. Benilde
F	33	Jed Diaz	6 ft 5 in (1.96 m)
F	44	Allan Beltran	6 ft 5 in (1.96 m)			UE
C	47	Tzaddy Rangel	6 ft 7 in (2.01 m)		1996–12–22	National-U

Coaches

Head coach

- MC Abolucion

Assistant coach(es)

- Mac Cuan
- Japs Cuan
- Ethel Tajorda
- Julius Sinon

Legend

- (HG) Homegrown
- (FF) Filipino-foreigner
- (SGL) Special Guest Licensee
- (RS) Reserve player
- Injured

- Roster – via Genius Sports

== Regular season ==
=== Standings ===
Pos	Team	Pld	W	L	GB
7	Davao Occidental Tigers	28	15	13	6
8	Negros Muscovados	28	12	16	9
9	Iloilo United Royals	28	11	17	10
10	Mindoro Tamaraws	28	10	18	11
11	Muntinlupa Cagers	28	7	21	14

Source: Standings
Rules for classification: 1) Wins; 2a) If two teams are tied, head-to-head match-up; 2b) If three or more teams are tied, head-to-head point quotient; 3) overall point quotient; 4) coin toss.

=== Schedule ===
2024 Iloilo United Royals season schedule
Game	Date	Opponent	Score	Location	Record	Recap
1	April 9	Bacolod	W 85–67	Villar Coliseum	1–0	Recap
2	April 13	Batangas City	L 64–71	Batangas City Coliseum	1–1	
3	April 18	Parañaque	–	Caloocan Sports Complex	1–2	
4	April 25	San Juan	–	Filoil EcoOil Centre		
5	May 3	Mindoro	–	Caloocan Sports Complex		
6	May 9	Bicolandia	–	Filoil EcoOil Centre		
7	May 14	Pasay	–	Cuneta Astrodome		
8	May 20	Negros	–	Bren Z. Guiao Convention Center		
9	May 25	Quezon City	–	Quezon Convention Center		
10	May 31	Imus	–	Batangas City Coliseum		
11						
12						
13						
14						
15						
16						
17						
18						
19						
20						
21						
22						
23						
24						
25						
26						
27						
28						
29						
Source: Schedule
