= 2023 Bacoor City Strikers season =

Fourth season of the franchise in the MPBL; last active season

- Division champions
- Head coach: Alexander Angeles
- Arena(s): Strike Gymnasium

Results
- Record: 23–5 (.821)
- Place: Division: 1st (South)
- Playoff finish: National finals (lost vs. Pampanga, 0–3)

Bacoor City Strikers seasons

The 2023 Bacoor City Strikers season was the fourth the season of the franchise in the Maharlika Pilipinas Basketball League (MPBL).

Despite a playoff appearance last season, the Strikers looked to improve from their worst season yet in terms of win percentage. With the additions of Michael Cañete, James Kwekuteye, and Jhan Nermal, as well as reigning Defensive Player of the Year Mark Yee, Bacoor City rocketed up to a 23–5 record, claiming the top seed of the South Division as well as their best season in terms of win percentage.

The Strikers were left stunned following a game 1 loss to Iloilo in the division quarterfinals, but persevered and won the series. They then swept the reigning South Division champions Zamboanga and well as perennial contenders Batangas City to reach the 2023 MPBL finals against the Pampanga Giant Lanterns. Despite a couple of close efforts, Bacoor City would end up getting swept themselves, ending the season as runners-up.

ultimately returning to the MPBL in 2026

The team played all of their home games this season at Strike Gymnasium.

== Roster ==
2023 Bacoor City Strikers roster
Players

Pos.	No.	Name	Height	Weight	DOB	From
G/F	1	Kraniel Villoria	6 ft 1 in (1.85 m)		1995–07–14	Arellano
F	3	Michael Cañete	6 ft 4 in (1.93 m)		1993–08–14	Arellano
F	6	Lester Reyes	6 ft 4 in (1.93 m)			SJIT
C	8	Jhaymo Eguilos	6 ft 6 in (1.98 m)	190 lb (86 kg)	1986–08–27	Far Eastern
G	9	Aaron Jeruta	5 ft 10 in (1.78 m)		1994–10–16	Centro Escolar
C	10	Mark Montuaño				Informatics
G	12	Eric Acuña	5 ft 10 in (1.78 m)			Informatics
G	14	Salvador Galit	6 ft 0 in (1.83 m)			Philippine Christian
G	15	James Kwekuteye	6 ft 3 in (1.91 m)			San Beda
G	16	Yvan Ludovice	5 ft 10 in (1.78 m)			San Beda
G	17	Alwyn Alday	5 ft 11 in (1.80 m)		1990–04–18	La Consolacion
C	19	John Derico Lopez	6 ft 4 in (1.93 m)			José Rizal
G	20	Joel Lee Yu	5 ft 9 in (1.75 m)	155 lb (70 kg)	1994–08–20	Far Eastern
G	24	Jimboy Pasturan (SGL)				St. Benilde
F	28	Chito Jaime	6 ft 4 in (1.93 m)	200 lb (91 kg)	1983–10–21	AMA
F	29	Jhan Nermal	6 ft 3 in (1.91 m)			STI Negros
F	52	Mark Yee (EP)	6 ft 3 in (1.91 m)	170 lb (77 kg)	1982–01–04	San Sebastian Cavite
G	77	Rocky Acidre	5 ft 11 in (1.80 m)			Arellano
F	81	Jammer Jamito	6 ft 5 in (1.96 m)	170 lb (77 kg)	1990–09–01	St. Clare

Coaches

Head coach

- Alexander Angeles

Assistant coach(es)

- Rosser Benjamin Mangahas
- Rey Mendez
- Marlou Aquino
- Marlo Corpin

Team consultant

- BJ Aganus

Team manager

- Dennis Abella

Legend

- (HG) Homegrown
- (FF) Filipino-foreigner
- (SGL) Special Guest Licensee
- (RS) Reserve player
- Injured

- Roster – via Genius Sports

== Regular season ==
=== Standings ===
Pos	Team	Pld	W	L	GB
1	Bacoor City Strikers	28	23	5	—
2	Batangas City Embassy Chill	28	22	6	1
3	GenSan Warriors	28	21	7	2
4	Zamboanga Family's Brand Sardines	28	20	8	3
5	Quezon Huskers	28	19	9	4

Source: Standings
Rules for classification: 1) Wins; 2a) If two teams are tied, head-to-head match-up; 2b) If three or more teams are tied, head-to-head point quotient; 3) overall point quotient; 4) coin toss.

=== Schedule ===
2023 Bacoor City Strikers season schedule
Game	Date	Opponent	Score	Location	Record	Recap
1	March 16	Manila	W 76–62	Muntinlupa Sports Center	1–0	
2	March 20	Marikina	W 75–55	Strike Gymnasium	2–0	
3	March 27	Valenzuela	W 76–68	Batangas City Coliseum	3–0	
4	April 3	Sarangani	W 85–70	Filoil EcoOil Centre	4–0	
5	April 17	Caloocan	L 75–84	Strike Gymnasium	4–1	
6	April 24	Quezon City	W 93–58	Filoil EcoOil Centre	5–1	
7	May 1	San Juan	W 73–49	Strike Gymnasium	6–1	
8	May 9	Laguna	W 75–76	Batangas City Coliseum	7–1	
9	May 15	Imus	W 60–52	Strike Gymnasium	8–1	
10	May 22	Rizal	W 86–69	Baliwag Star Arena	9–1	
11	May 26	General Santos	W 74–68	Filoil EcoOil Centre	10–1	
12	June 2	Bulacan	W 78–69	Strike Gymnasium	11–1	
13	June 8	Pasig City	L 72–79	Olivarez College	11–2	
14	June 13	Iloilo	W 74–69	Strike Gymnasium	12–2	
15	June 21	Pasay	W 79–65	Strike Gymnasium	13–2	
16	June 29	Makati	W 81–77	Strike Gymnasium	14–2	
17	July 5	Muntinlupa	W 74–73	Strike Gymnasium	15–2	
18	July 11	Parañaque	W 83–58	Strike Gymnasium	16–2	
19	July 17	Nueva Ecija	L 75–83	Nueva Ecija Coliseum	16–3	
20	July 22	Pampanga	L 70–78	Laguna Sports Complex	16–4	
21	August 1	Bicol	W 113–75	Strike Gymnasium	17–4	
22	August 7	Bacolod	W 91–86	Ynares Center	18–4	
23	August 12	Batangas City	W 71–64	Strike Gymnasium	19–4	
24	August 18	Quezon	W 75–43	Strike Gymnasium	20–4	
25	August 21	Mindoro	W 95–76	Batangas City Coliseum	21–4	
26	September 13	Negros	W 88–72	WES Arena	22–4	
27	September 27	Zamboanga	L 81–92	Strike Gymnasium	22–5	
28	October 3	Bataan	W 93–65	Marikina Sports Center	23–5	
Source: Schedule

== Playoffs ==
=== Schedule ===
2023 Bacoor City Strikers playoff schedule
Round	Game	Date	Opponent	Score	Location	Series	Recap
Division Quarterfinals	1	October 7	Iloilo	L 86–69	Strike Gymnasium	0–1	Recap
Division Quarterfinals	2	October 14	Iloilo	W 92–52	Mayor Vitaliano D. Agan Coliseum	1–1	Recap
Division Quarterfinals	3	October 21	Iloilo	W 72–61	Strike Gymnasium	2–1	Recap
Division Semifinals	1	October 28	Zamboanga	W 61–56	Strike Gymnasium	1–0	Recap
Division Semifinals	2	November 4	Zamboanga	W 78–72	Batangas City Coliseum	2–0	Recap
Division Finals	1	November 13	Batangas City	W 89–68	Strike Gymnasium	1–0	Recap
Division Finals	2	November 17	Batangas City	W 54–49	Batangas City Coliseum	2–0	Recap
National Finals	1	November 25	Pampanga	L 58–71	Bren Z. Guiao Convention Center	0–1	Recap
National Finals	2	November 28	Pampanga	L 65–68	Bren Z. Guiao Convention Center	0–2	Recap
National Finals	3	December 2	Pampanga	L 77–82	Strike Gymnasium	0–3	Recap
Source: Schedule
