= 2024 Batangas City Tanduay Rum Masters season =

Sixth season of the franchise in the MPBL

- Head coach: Cholo Villanueva
- Arena(s): Batangas City Coliseum

Results
- Record: 20–8 (.714)
- Place: Division: 2nd (South)

Batangas City Tanduay Rum Masters seasons

The 2024 Batangas City Tanduay Rum Masters season will be the sixth season of the franchise in the Maharlika Pilipinas Basketball League (MPBL).

Renamed as the Tanduay Rum Masters, bringing back the moniker of Tanduay Distillers' former PBA team, Batangas City will enter this season coming off back-to-back Division Finals appearances. After the Bataan Risers missed the playoffs last season, the Rum Masters are now the sole holder of the longest active playoff appearance streak in the league, having made five consecutive appearances since 2018.

The team will play their home games at Batangas City Coliseum.

== Roster ==
2024 Batangas City Tanduay Rum Masters roster
Players

Pos.	No.	Name	Height	Weight	DOB	From
G	0	RJ Ramirez	6 ft 0 in (1.83 m)			Far Eastern
G	1	Carlos Isit Jr.	5 ft 9 in (1.75 m)		1984–02–21
G	8	Arturo Oliva III (HG)	5 ft 10 in (1.78 m)			Arellano
G	9	Philip Paniamogan	6 ft 0 in (1.83 m)	180 lb (82 kg)	1991–05–30	José Rizal
G	10	Rudy Lingganay	5 ft 10 in (1.78 m)	170 lb (77 kg)	1986–08–15	UE
F/C	14	Kris Porter	6 ft 5 in (1.96 m)	195 lb (88 kg)	1994–09–02	Ateneo
F	15	Dawn Ochea	6 ft 3 in (1.91 m)	175 lb (79 kg)		Adamson
G/F	19	Oliver Neal Arim (HG)	6 ft 2 in (1.88 m)			Centro Escolar
G	21	VJ Alarcon (HG)	6 ft 0 in (1.83 m)
G	22	Levi Hernandez	6 ft 1 in (1.85 m)	190 lb (86 kg)	1990–03–09	Arellano
F	23	Cedric Ablaza	6 ft 3 in (1.91 m)			STI
C	24	Mark Neil Cruz	6 ft 5 in (1.96 m)			José Rizal
C	26	John Ambulodto	6 ft 5 in (1.96 m)	195 lb (88 kg)	1990–09–25	St. Clare
G	27	King Importante	6 ft 2 in (1.88 m)			Adamson
G	31	MJ Dela Virgen	5 ft 10 in (1.78 m)			José Rizal
G	37	Jaycee Asuncion	5 ft 9 in (1.75 m)			José Rizal
F	43	Jeckster Apinan	6 ft 3 in (1.91 m)	190 lb (86 kg)	1987-01-09	José Rizal
G	45	Juneric Baloria	5 ft 11 in (1.80 m)		1990–06–03	UPHSD
F/C	51	James Sena	6 ft 5 in (1.96 m)	225 lb (102 kg)	1988-08-31	José Rizal
F	81	Darwin Lunor	6 ft 3 in (1.91 m)			St. Clare

Coaches

Head coach

- Pocholo Villanueva

Assistant coach(es)

- Jay-R Aquino
- Warren Capitan
- John Mark Arenas
- Dino Ponce Enrile

Legend

- (HG) Homegrown
- (FF) Filipino-foreigner
- (SGL) Special Guest Licensee
- (RS) Reserve player
- Injured

- Roster – via Genius Sports
Updated as of: April 10, 2024

== Regular season ==
=== Standings ===
Pos	Team	Pld	W	L	GB
1	Quezon Huskers	28	21	7	—
2	Batangas City Tanduay Rum Masters	28	20 (Note: Batangas City (1.132), Biñan (0.950), and Zamboanga (0.931) are ranked based on head-to-head point quotient.)	8	1
3	Biñan Tatak Gel	28	20	8	1
4	Zamboanga Master Sardines	28	20	8	1
5	Parañaque Patriots	28	17 (Note: Parañaque wins tiebreaker over South Cotabato based on head-to-head record.)	11	4

Source: Standings
Rules for classification: 1) Wins; 2a) If two teams are tied, head-to-head match-up; 2b) If three or more teams are tied, head-to-head point quotient; 3) overall point quotient; 4) coin toss.

=== Schedule ===
2024 Batangas City Tanduay Rum Masters season schedule
Game	Date	Opponent	Score	Location	Record	Recap
1	April 10	Bulacan	–	Alonte Sports Arena		
2	April 13	Iloilo	–	Batangas City Coliseum		
3	April 19	Imus	–	Cuneta Astrodome		
4	April 25	Pasay	–	Filoil EcoOil Centre		
5	May 1	Rizal	–	Batangas City Coliseum		
6	May 8	Negros	–	Cuneta Astrodome		
7	May 15	Tarlac	–	Batangas City Coliseum		
8	May 20	Quezon City	–	Bren Z. Guiao Convention Center		
9	May 25	Quezon	–	Quezon Convention Center		
10	May 31	Bataan	–	Batangas City Coliseum		
11						
12						
13						
14						
15						
16						
17						
18						
19						
20						
21						
22						
23						
24						
25						
26						
27						
28						
29						
Source: Schedule
