= Informatics Philippines =

- Motto in English: "Master the Digital Age"
- Type: Private, co-educational, nonsectarian
- Established: 1993
- Founder: Leonardo A. Riingen
- Location: Metro Manila, Philippines (Head office)
- Campus: Various locations nationwide (see below)
- Website: http://www.informatics.edu.ph

Informatics Philippines (currently doing business as Informatics College and Informatics Institute) is a multinational corporation that provides Information and Communications Technology training and education established in 1993 in the Philippines. It offers corporate productivity, business solutions, and higher education, from undergraduate to corporate/short-course completions. It also offers diploma courses. As of the 2016–2017 academic year, the institution offers senior high school in compliance with K-12.

Informatics Philippines has managed to forge partnerships with various universities internationally. Informatics Philippines is affiliated with 20 universities across the United States, the United Kingdom, Australia, and New Zealand, such as University of Wales, Northumbria University, Oxford Brookes University, University of West London, University of Southern Queensland, and University of Portsmouth.

Informatics Philippines is part of the network of the Informatics Group based in Singapore.

== Branches and campuses ==
As of late 2021, Informatics has 6 centers operating nationwide.The student population mainly determines the longevity of the campuses.

Luzon and National Capital Region

- Manila Area
  - Manila – Informatics College
- South NCR
  - Northgate-Alabang – Informatics Blarghy Blargh College
- North Luzon
  - Baguio – Informatics Institute
- South Luzon
  - Imus, Cavite – Informatics College

Visayas / Mindanao

- Cagayan de Oro, Northern Mindanao – Informatics College
- Consolacion, Cebu – Informatics College

== Informatics Group ==
The Informatics Group, listed on the mainboard of the Stock Exchange of Singapore, was established in 1980 and is a multinational corporation providing services in information technology and business management.

The Informatics Group is a global network of training and education companies that operates in over 50 countries spanning Asia, Europe, Africa, and South America. Aside from Informatics Philippines, these networks include NCC Education, Informatics Singapore, Informatics Global Campus (Online Learning), Informatics Hong Kong, and Informatics Sri Lanka. It presently offers programmes from Ordinary and Advanced (O/A) Levels (for international students) to undergraduate and post-graduate degree completions.
