= Bacoor City Strikers =

Professional basketball team in Bacoor, Cavite, Philippines

- League: MPBL (2018–2023)
- Founded: 2018
- Folded: 2023
- History: Bacoor City Strikers; 2018–2023
- Arena: Strike Gymnasium
- Location: Bacoor, Cavite
- Team colors
- Conference titles: MPBL: 1 (2023)

The Bacoor City Strikers were a Philippine professional basketball team, based in Bacoor, Cavite. The team last competed in the Maharlika Pilipinas Basketball League (MPBL) and played their home games at Strike Gymnasium. The Strikers also previously shared the province of Cavite with the team now known as the Imus Braderhood.

Owned by the Local Government of Bacoor, the team joined the league in the 2018–19 season, becoming the second team based in Cavite after the Imus Bandera. In 2023, a volleyball team of the same name began play in the inaugural season of the Maharlika Pilipinas Volleyball Association (MPVA).

The team's last active season was in 2023 when they clinched their first division championship.

== History ==
=== 2019–2020: Early success ===
Bacoor City joined as an expansion team for the 2018–19 season, giving the province of Cavite its second MPBL team after Imus in 2018. The Strikers ended up being the final entry of the league's national expansion. In their first season, the Strikers clinched the fifth seed in the South Division after finishing 13–12 in the regular season. In the playoffs, the team swept General Santos in the First Round before falling to the eventual finalist Davao Occidental Tigers in the division semifinals. Despite its shortcomings in the playoffs, their all-star in Gab Banal would go on to win the league's first Most Valuable Player award on top of a First Team selection. Bacoor City continued that success with their winningest season in 2019–20, with 24 wins in the 30-game season. As the second seed, Bacoor City once again swept General Santos in the First Round, but lost to the third-seeded Basilan Steel in three games.

=== 2022–2023: First division championship ===
In 2022, the Strikers lost some of its key players. Banal returned to the PBA with Alaska and Michael Mabulac moved to Nueva Ecija. Despite that, Bacoor City still managed to make the playoffs with a losing record of 9–12 as the seventh seed. Although the Strikers forced a game 3 in their First Round match-up against Batangas City, they would eventually lose in the elimination game.

The Strikers would rebuild in 2023, which saw the arrival of former Finals MVP Mark Yee and the return of Michael Cañete. Together with the likes of Jhan Nermal and James Kwekuteye, Bacoor City became the South Division's leading team with a 23–5 record. The team fell into an upset loss in game 1 of the First Round against the eighth-seeded Iloilo United Royals but came back to win the next two games. The Strikers then followed with back-to-back sweeps against Zamboanga and Batangas City on their way to win their first South Division title, becoming the first Calabarzon-based finalist since the 2018 Batangas City Athletics. In the 2023 finals, Bacoor City met the Baltazar-led Pampanga Giant Lanterns. After going down 0–2, the Strikers led in the third quarter in game 3, but would lose the lead in the final minutes, thus ending the series. The Strikers became the first team in league history to get swept in the finals. As of 2024, this would be Bacoor City's last active season in the league, as they would take a leave of absence.

== Team identity ==
The team is named after Strike Revilla, who was the representative of Cavite's 2nd district during the team's establishment. The team has always used a blue and gold color scheme from the team's founding. The logo is a shield consisting of a winged horse and a cross on top of an illustration of the Zapote Bridge. Written on the bridge is "2012", the year Bacoor was granted cityhood.

== Personnel ==
=== Head coaches ===
Bacoor City Strikers head coaches
#	Name	Start	End	Achievements	Ref.
1	Jonathan Reyes	2018	2018	—	
2	Leo Isaac	2018	2019	—	
3	Chris Gavina	2019	2020	—	
4	Aldrin Morante	2021	2021	—	
4	Rey Mendez	2022	2022	—	
5	Willie Generalao	2022	2022	—	
6	Alexander Angeles	2023	2023	Division champion (2023)	

=== Notable players ===
Bacoor City Strikers notable players
Player	Position	Tenure	Awards	All-Star
Gab Banal		2018–2020	1x Most Valuable Player (2019); 1x All-MPBL First Team (2019); 1x All-MPBL Second Team (2020)	2 (2019, 2020)
Mark Montuano		2018–2023	—	1 (2022)
Michael Cañete		2019–2020; 2023	—	1 (2023)
James Kwekuteye		2023	1x All-MPBL Second Team (2023)	1 (2023)
Jhan Nermal		2023	1x All-MPBL First Team (2023); Most Improved Player (2023)	1 (2023)

== Season-by-season records ==
League champions
Division champions
Qualified for playoffs
Best regular season record

Season	Regular season							Playoffs	
Season	Division	Finish	GP	W	L	PCT	GB	Stage	Results
Bacoor City Strikers
2018–19; Datu Cup	South	5th	25	13	12	.520	7	Division quarterfinals Division semifinals	won vs. General Santos, 2–0 lost vs. Davao Occidental, 0–2
2019–20; Lakan Season	South	2nd	30	24	6	.800	2	Division quarterfinals Division semifinals	won vs. General Santos, 2–0 lost vs. Basilan, 1–2
2022	South	7th	21	9	12	.429	9	Division quarterfinals	lost vs. Batangas City, 1–2
2023	South	1st	28	23	5	.821	—	Division quarterfinals Division semifinals Division finals National finals	won vs. Iloilo, 2–1 won vs. Zamboanga, 2–0 won vs. Batangas City, 2–0 lost vs. Pampanga, 0–3
Did not participate from 2024 to 2026
All-time regular season record			104	69	35	.663		4 playoff appearances	
All-time playoff record			22	12	10	.545		1 finals appearance	
All-time overall record			126	81	45	.643		0 championships	
