= 2023 MPBL finals =

Championship series of the Maharlika Pilipinas Basketball League's 2023 season

Team	Coach	Wins
Pampanga Giant Lanterns	Dennis Pineda	3
Bacoor City Strikers	Alex Angeles	0
- Dates: November 25 – December 2, 2023
- MVP: Justine Baltazar
- Northern finals: Pampanga def. San Juan, 2–0
- Southern finals: Bacoor City def. Batangas City, 2–0

The 2023 MPBL finals was the championship series of the Maharlika Pilipinas Basketball League's (MPBL) 2023 season and the conclusion of the season's playoffs. In the best-of-five playoff, the North Division champion Pampanga Giant Lanterns faced the South Division champion Bacoor City Strikers, with both teams having not won an MPBL title nor appeared in the MPBL finals before, this series would determine which team becomes the league's fifth different champions. The series began on November 25, 2023 and ended on December 2, 2023.

In three games, the Pampanga Giant Lanterns completed the first finals sweep in MPBL history, giving them their first MPBL championship and second league championship overall. Justine Baltazar was named Finals MVP of the series, becoming not only the first player in league history to be a recipient of both season MVP and Finals MVP, but also the first to win both awards in the same season.

This was the first time since the league's national expansion in the 2018–19 season in which the finals featured two Luzon-based teams. This was also the second consecutive finals in which neither team is based in Metro Manila.

For sponsorship reasons, this series is officially known as the 2023 Nexus88 MPBL Finals presented by Xtreme.

== Background ==
=== Pampanga Giant Lanterns ===
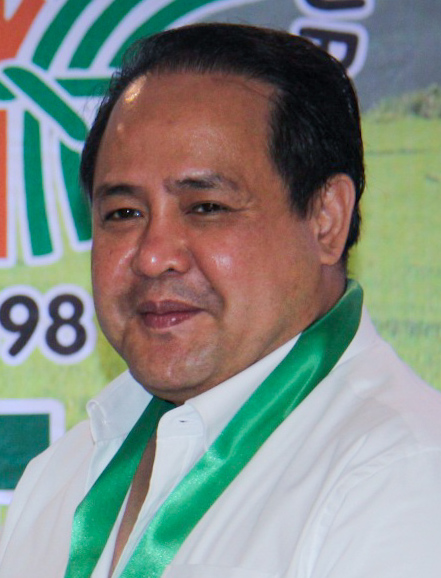
Pampanga governor Dennis Pineda brought the Giant Lanterns to their first MPBL finals appearance.

After back-to-back division semifinals appearances in 2020 and 2022, the Pampanga Giant Lanterns loaded its roster throughout the course of the 2023 season. Justine Baltazar and Encho Serrano are among the notable additions to the Giant Lanterns, both of them would go on to become all-star selections in the 2023 All-Star Game. Led by their head coach in Pampanga governor Dennis Pineda, the homegrown-laden Giant Lanterns finished the regular season with a league-best 26–2, only losing to Batangas and Makati. The team's 26 wins is also tied with the 2020 San Juan Knights and Davao Occidental Tigers for most wins in a single season.

In the playoffs, Pampanga swept through Marikina and Caloocan in the first two rounds before stumbling upon the Wamar-led San Juan Knights in Pampanga's first division finals appearance. Although Pampanga took the series advantage with a win in game 1, game 2 proved to be a challenge as San Juan led by 13 points heading into the fourth quarter. In the fourth quarter, Pampanga scored 25 points while San Juan was held down to just six points as the Giant Lanterns appear in their first-ever MPBL finals. Pampanga became the second Central Luzon-based team to make the finals after Nueva Ecija last season.

=== Bacoor City Strikers ===
Ever since joining as Cavite's second team, Bacoor City has seen success in the semi-professional era with 2019 MVP Gab Banal. The Strikers reached the division semifinals in back-to-back seasons in 2019 and 2020. After finishing with a losing record in 2022 following Banal's move to the Philippine Basketball Association (PBA), a rebuild followed ahead of the 2023 season which saw the arrivals of Jhan Nermal, James Kwekuteye, and the return of Michael Cañete. Also joining the Strikers is former MPBL Finals MVP and reigning Defensive Player of the Year Mark Yee. Nermal, Kwekuteye, and Cañete were all selected for the All-Star Game. Coached by Alex Angeles, Bacoor City finished the season as the South Division's top seed with a 23–5 record.

Following an unexpected loss to Iloilo in game 1 of the First Round, the Strikers fought through, defeating Iloilo in three and then defeating reigning South Division champion Zamboanga in the division semifinals. In the division finals, Bacoor City met with their Calabarzon neighbors in the second-seeded Batangas City Embassy Chill, who were only one game behind the Strikers in the regular season. Whilst game 1 was a blowout win for Bacoor City, Batangas City had the early lead in game 2. In the fourth quarter, the Strikers scored 14–5 over the Embassy Chill to take the lead and eventually sweep the series. Bacoor City became the second Calabarzon-based representative in the finals after Batangas City.

== Road to the finals ==
Pampanga Giant Lanterns (North Division champion)		Bacoor City Strikers (South Division champion)
Pos / Team / Pld / W / L / GB; 1 / Pampanga Giant Lanterns / 28 / 26 / 2 / —; 2 / Nueva Ecija Rice Vanguards / 28 / 23 / 5 / 3; 3 / Makati OKBet Kings / 28 / 21 / 7 / 5; 4 / Caloocan Batang Kankaloo / 28 / 20 / 8 / 6; 5 / Pasig City MCW Sports / 28 / 19 (Note: Pasig wins tiebreaker over San Juan based on head-to-head victory.) / 9 / 7; 6 / San Juan Knights / 28 / 19 / 9 / 7; 7 / Pasay Voyagers / 28 / 17 / 11 / 9; 8 / Marikina Shoemasters / 28 / 16 / 12 / 10; 9 / Bataan Risers / 28 / 13 / 15 / 13; 10 / Rizal Golden Coolers / 28 / 12 / 16 / 14; 11 / Parañaque Patriots / 28 / 11 / 17 / 15; 12 / Bulacan Kuyas / 28 / 7 / 21 / 19; 13 / Manila Stars / 27 / 4 / 23 / 21.5; 14 / Quezon City Toda Aksyon / 28 / 3 (Note: Quezon City wins tiebreaker over Valenzuela based on head-to-head victory.) / 25 / 23; 15 / Valenzuela XUR Homes Realty Inc. / 28 / 3 / 25 / 23; Source: Standings; Notes:	Regular season	Pos / Team / Pld / W / L / GB; 1 / Bacoor City Strikers / 28 / 23 / 5 / —; 2 / Batangas City Embassy Chill / 28 / 22 / 6 / 1; 3 / GenSan Warriors / 28 / 21 / 7 / 2; 4 / Zamboanga Family's Brand Sardines / 28 / 20 / 8 / 3; 5 / Quezon Huskers / 28 / 19 / 9 / 4; 6 / Muntinlupa Cagers / 28 / 16 / 12 / 7; 7 / Imus SV Squad / 28 / 15 / 13 / 8; 8 / Iloilo United Royals / 28 / 12 / 16 / 11; 9 / Bacolod City of Smiles / 28 / 11 (Note: Bacolod wins tiebreaker over Sarangani based on head-to-head victory.) / 17 / 12; 10 / Sarangani Marlins / 28 / 11 / 17 / 12; 11 / Negros Muscovados / 28 / 10 / 18 / 13; 12 / Mindoro Disiplinados / 28 / 6 / 22 / 17; 13 / Laguna Krah Asia / 27 / 4 / 23 / 18.5; 14 / Bicol Volcanoes / 28 / 1 / 27 / 22; Source: Standings; Notes:
Defeated 8th-seeded Marikina Shoemasters, 2–0	First round	Defeated 8th-seeded Iloilo United Royals, 2–1
Defeated 4th-seeded Caloocan Batang Kankaloo, 2–0	Division semifinals	Defeated 4th-seeded Zamboanga Family's Brand Sardines, 2–0
Defeated 6th-seeded San Juan Knights, 2–0	Division finals	Defeated 2nd-seeded Batangas City Embassy Chill, 2–0

=== Head-to-head matchup ===
MPTV

July 22
06:00 pm

Boxscore

Pampanga Giant Lanterns	78–70	Bacoor City Strikers
Scoring by quarter: 24–12, 20–26, 15–16, 19–16
Pts: Encho Serrano 18; Rebs: Justine Baltazar 18; Asts: John Bryle Bahio 5		Pts: Jhan Nermal 19; Rebs: Jhan Nermal 9 Asts: Aaron Jeruta 4

Laguna Sports Complex,
Santa Cruz, Laguna

== Series summary ==
The Pampanga Giant Lanterns (26–2) held homecourt advantage in the series for having a better regular season record than the Bacoor City Strikers (23–5).

Game	Date	Away team	Result	Home team	Venue
1	November 25	Bacoor City Strikers	58–71 (0–1)	Pampanga Giant Lanterns	Bren Z. Guiao Convention Center
2	November 28	Bacoor City Strikers	65–68 (0–2)	Pampanga Giant Lanterns	Bren Z. Guiao Convention Center
3	December 2	Pampanga Giant Lanterns	82–77 (3–0)	Bacoor City Strikers	Strike Gymnasium

== Game summaries ==
=== Game 1 ===
One PH
Media Pilipinas TV

November 25
07:00 pm

Boxscore

Pampanga Giant Lanterns	71–58	Bacoor City Strikers
Scoring by quarter: 21–7, 17–21, 15–9, 18–21
Pts: Kurt Reyson 21; Rebs: Justine Baltazar 16; Asts: Justine Baltazar 6		Pts: Jhaymo Eguilos, Jhan Nermal 16; Rebs: Mark Yee 8 Asts: three players 2
Pampanga leads series, 1–0

Bren Z. Guiao Convention Center, San Fernando, Pampanga

After his stint with the Letran Knights during NCAA Season 99, Kurt Reyson made his return to the Pampanga Giant Lanterns roster. Coming off the bench, Reyson became the Player of the Game as he scored 22 points on 75% shooting, including a perfect 4-for-4 from beyond the arc. Justine Baltazar led the rebound and assist statistics with 16 and 6 respectively to go alongside his 13 points. Encho Serrano only scored five points after shooting 2-for-11.

In the losing effort, both Jhaymo Eguilos and Jhan Nermal scored 16 points for the Bacoor City Strikers. James Kwekuteye only scored two points, only making one of his twelve shot attempts.

=== Game 2 ===
One PH
Media Pilipinas TV

November 28
07:00 pm

Boxscore

Pampanga Giant Lanterns	68–65	Bacoor City Strikers
Scoring by quarter: 14–12, 19–17, 17–20, 18–16
Pts: Justine Baltazar, Archie Concepcion 13; Rebs: Justine Baltazar 12; Asts: Justine Baltazar 6		Pts: James Kwekuteye 16; Rebs: Jhaymo Eguilos 9 Asts: Aaron Jeruta 4
Pampanga leads series, 2–0

Bren Z. Guiao Convention Center, San Fernando, Pampanga

In a game that went back-and-forth during the second half, former Homegrown Player of the Year Archie Concepcion scored 13 points and 8 rebounds to become the Player of the Game. The newly-crowned MVP in Baltazar recorded another double-double with 13 points and 12 rebounds on top of six assists. Serrano, despite a 25% field goal percentage, still scored eight points for Pampanga.

After a dismal performance in game 1, Kwekuteye scored 16 points on 5-for-11 three-point shooting. Both Chito Jaime and Yvan Ludovice also scored double-digits for Bacoor City with 12 and 11, respectively.

Following a steal by Kwekuteye, Bacoor City held the final possession of the game with the Strikers down by just three points. Kwekuteye missed a three-point attempt but was rebounded by Jhan Nermal. The ball ended up in the hands of Mark Yee, but unfortunately, Yee cannot get the ball off before the shot clock expired, giving the Pampanga Giant Lanterns the win and putting them one game away from their first MPBL title as the series shifts to the Marching Band Capital.

=== Game 3 ===
One PH
Media Pilipinas TV

December 2
07:00 pm

Boxscore

Bacoor City Strikers	77–82	Pampanga Giant Lanterns
Scoring by quarter: 20–20, 11–11, 22–17, 24–34
Pts: Jhan Nermal 20; Rebs: Mark Yee 10; Asts: Yvan Ludovice, Michael Cañete 4		Pts: Encho Serrano 24; Rebs: Justine Baltazar 19; Asts: three players 5
Pampanga wins series, 3–0

Strike Gymnasium, Bacoor, Cavite

Serrano won Player of the Game honors in the championship-clinching Game 3, scoring 24 points on 45% shooting and 4 assists. Archie Concepcion also made a big contribution, with 18 points on 50% shooting. Reyson and Baltazar are the two other players who scored double-digits, scoring 13 and 11, respectively. Baltazar also led the rebounding game with 19 rebounds as well as 3 steals.

Jhan Nermal and James Kwekuteye scored a combined 35 points to close out the Strikers' season, with Kwekuteye also shooting 5-for-8 from the three-point line. Eguilos scored 11 points on 50% shooting while Yee led the team's rebounds with 10.

Game 3 saw both teams tying at the end of the first and second quarters. Bacoor City led by five points at the end of the third quarter, but Pampanga took the lead just three minutes into the fourth quarter. Pampanga then went on an 8–1 run near the end of the game to lead the Giant Lanterns to their first MPBL title. Dennis Pineda was awarded with the Coach of the Year, while Baltazar was named the season's Finals MVP.

== Rosters ==
2023 Pampanga Giant Lanterns roster
Players

Pos.	No.	Name	Height	Weight	DOB	From
G	2	Archie Concepcion (HG)	6 ft 2 in (1.88 m)			Arellano
G	3	CJ Gania (HG)	6 ft 2 in (1.88 m)			DHVSU
F	4	Kevin Kyle Santos (SGL)	6 ft 7 in (2.01 m)			Letran
F	6	Louie Sangalang	6 ft 6 in (1.98 m)			Letran
F	7	JB Bahio	6 ft 6 in (1.98 m)			San Beda
G	8	Neil Tolentino (HG)	6 ft 1 in (1.85 m)			Arellano
G	9	Karl Sampang (HG)	6 ft 0 in (1.83 m)			Holy Angel
G	11	Michael Jeffrey Garcia (HG)	6 ft 0 in (1.83 m)			SPCF
G	13	Kurt Reyson (SGL)	5 ft 10 in (1.78 m)			Letran
F	14	Jayson Apolonio	6 ft 3 in (1.91 m)			DMMMSU
G	18	Encho Serrano (EP, HG)	6 ft 0 in (1.83 m)	176 lb (80 kg)	1999–09–18	De La Salle
F	19	Justine Baltazar (HG)	6 ft 8 in (2.03 m)	250 lb (113 kg)	1997–02–19	De La Salle
C	22	Ronan Santos (HG)	6 ft 7 in (2.01 m)			Arellano
C	25	Matt De Leon (HG)	6 ft 7 in (2.01 m)			Arellano
F	29	Arwind Santos (EP, HG)	6 ft 4 in (1.93 m)	175 lb (79 kg)	1981–06–10	Far Eastern
G	30	Raymond Binuya (C, HG)	5 ft 8 in (1.73 m)			San Sebastian
F	34	Mitchelle Maynes	6 ft 4 in (1.93 m)
F	43	Allen Liwag (SGL)	6 ft 7 in (2.01 m)			St. Benilde
G	77	John Loyd Clemente (HG)	6 ft 3 in (1.91 m)			National-U

Coaches

Head coach

- Dennis Pineda

Assistant coach(es)

- Hupmerdink Dimatulac

Legend

- (HG) Homegrown
- (FF) Filipino-foreigner
- (SGL) Special Guest Licensee
- (RS) Reserve player
- Injured

2023 Bacoor City Strikers roster
Players

Pos.	No.	Name	Height	Weight	DOB	From
G/F	1	Kraniel Villoria	6 ft 1 in (1.85 m)		1995–07–14	Arellano
F	3	Michael Cañete	6 ft 4 in (1.93 m)		1993–08–14	Arellano
F	6	Lester Reyes	6 ft 4 in (1.93 m)			SJIT
C	8	Jhaymo Eguilos	6 ft 6 in (1.98 m)	190 lb (86 kg)	1986–08–27	Far Eastern
G	9	Aaron Jeruta	5 ft 10 in (1.78 m)		1994–10–16	Centro Escolar
C	10	Mark Montuaño				Informatics
G	12	Eric Acuña	5 ft 10 in (1.78 m)			Informatics
G	14	Salvador Galit	6 ft 0 in (1.83 m)			Philippine Christian
G	15	James Kwekuteye	6 ft 3 in (1.91 m)			San Beda
G	16	Yvan Ludovice	5 ft 10 in (1.78 m)			San Beda
G	17	Alwyn Alday	5 ft 11 in (1.80 m)		1990–04–18	La Consolacion
C	19	John Derico Lopez	6 ft 4 in (1.93 m)			José Rizal
G	20	Joel Lee Yu	5 ft 9 in (1.75 m)	155 lb (70 kg)	1994–08–20	Far Eastern
G	24	Jimboy Pasturan (SGL)				St. Benilde
F	28	Chito Jaime	6 ft 4 in (1.93 m)	200 lb (91 kg)	1983–10–21	AMA
F	29	Jhan Nermal	6 ft 3 in (1.91 m)			STI Negros
F	52	Mark Yee (EP)	6 ft 3 in (1.91 m)	170 lb (77 kg)	1982–01–04	San Sebastian Cavite
G	77	Rocky Acidre	5 ft 11 in (1.80 m)			Arellano
F	81	Jammer Jamito	6 ft 5 in (1.96 m)	170 lb (77 kg)	1990–09–01	St. Clare

Coaches

Head coach

- Alexander Angeles

Assistant coach(es)

- Rosser Benjamin Mangahas
- Rey Mendez
- Marlou Aquino
- Marlo Corpin

Team consultant

- BJ Aganus

Team manager

- Dennis Abella

Legend

- (HG) Homegrown
- (FF) Filipino-foreigner
- (SGL) Special Guest Licensee
- (RS) Reserve player
- Injured

== Broadcast notes ==
This marked the second time Cignal TV broadcast the MPBL finals. The games were broadcast on One PH as well as on Media Pilipinas TV (MPTV) on television. The games were also streamed on Pilipinas Live, Bola.TV, and on the MPBL's Facebook page and YouTube channel.

Game	Media Pilipinas TV and One PH		
Game	Play-by-play	Analyst	Courtside reporters
1	Migs Gomez	Jayvee Gayoso	Andrea Endicio and Mica Abesamis
2	Cedelf Tupas	Javi Palana	Sydney Crespo and Mica Abesamis
3	Cedelf Tupas	Louie Gonzalez	Andrea Endicio, Sydney Crespo and Mica Abesamis
