= 2023 MPBL playoffs =

Playoffs for the Maharlika Pilipinas Basketball League's 2023 season

2023 Nexus88 MPBL Playoffs presented by Xtreme

Tournament details
- Country: Philippines
- Dates: October 6 – December 2, 2023
- Teams: 16
- Defending champions: Nueva Ecija Rice Vanguards

Final positions
- Champions: Pampanga Giant Lanterns
- Runner-up: Bacoor City Strikers
- Semifinalists: San Juan Knights; Batangas City Embassy Chill

Tournament statistics
- Matches played: 36

The 2023 MPBL playoffs was the postseason tournament of the Maharlika Pilipinas Basketball League's 2023 season, the league's fifth overall, and the fourth under the 16-team format. The postseason tournament began on October 6, three days after the end of the regular season, and ended on December 2, 2023.

For sponsorship reasons, this playoff series is known as the 2023 Nexus88 MPBL Playoffs presented by Xtreme.

== Overview ==
=== Updates to playoff appearances ===
- The Pampanga Giant Lanterns entered the playoffs for the third consecutive season and also clinched the best record in the league for the first time.
- The Bacoor City Strikers entered the playoffs for the fourth consecutive season and also clinched the best record in the South Division for the first time.
- The Batangas City Embassy Chill entered the playoffs for the fifth consecutive season, currently the longest playoff streak in the MPBL.
- The GenSan Warriors, San Juan Knights, and Zamboanga Family's Brand Sardines entered the playoffs for the fourth consecutive season.
- Pasig City MCW Sports entered the playoffs for the third consecutive season.
- The Marikina Shoemasters, Muntinlupa Cagers, and Nueva Ecija Rice Vanguards entered the playoffs for the second consecutive season.
- The Quezon Huskers entered the playoffs for the first time in franchise history.
- The Iloilo United Royals, Makati OKBet Kings, and Pasay Voyagers entered the playoffs for the first time since 2020.
  - Excluding non-playing seasons, Iloilo and Pasay entered the playoffs for the second consecutive playing season.
- The Caloocan Batang Kankaloo and Imus SV Squad entered the playoffs for the first time since 2019.
- The Bacolod City of Smiles, Quezon City Toda Aksyon, Rizal Golden Coolers, Sarangani Marlins, and Valenzuela XUR Homes Realty Inc. missed the playoffs after making the postseason last season.
- The Bataan Risers missed the playoffs for the first time in franchise history, having made the postseason since 2018.
  - Excluding non-playing seasons, the Bicol Volcanoes and Bulacan Kuyas also missed the playoffs for the first time in a playing season. Bicol made the postseason in 2020 while Bulacan made the postseason since 2018.
- The Laguna Krah Asia and Parañaque Patriots missed the playoffs for the fourth consecutive season, currently tied for the longest playoff droughts in the MPBL including non-playing seasons.
  - Excluding non-playing seasons, Parañaque missed the playoffs for the third consecutive playing season.

=== Notable events ===
- With the elimination of Bataan, Batangas City is now the only founding team to have never missed the playoffs.
- Quezon is the first team in the professional era to make the playoffs in its inaugural season.
- Both Cavite teams (Bacoor City and Imus) enter the playoffs in the same season for the first time since 2019.

==== First round ====
- Iloilo became the first 8-seed to lead a playoff series against a 1-seed.
- Game 2 of the Makati–San Juan series was the first playoff game in league history to go into double overtime.
- General Santos's series win against Muntinlupa marked the first time a Soccsksargen-based team has won a playoff series.

==== Division finals ====
- San Juan became the lowest-seeded team to make the division finals. This was previously held by Manila in 2019 (4th in North).
  - San Juan is also the lowest-seeded team to make the penultimate round since Parañaque made the semifinals in 2018 (7th overall).
- Following Nueva Ecija's elimination to San Juan and Zamboanga's elimination to Bacoor City, this marks the first time neither of last season's finalists make the division finals.
- Both teams in the South Division finals are based in the Calabarzon region for the first time. It also the first time that the South Division finals won't feature a Mindanao-based team.
- Pampanga's 2–0 series victory over San Juan marked the first series sweep in the division finals.
  - It is also the first such sweep in the penultimate round since Batangas City's sweep against Valenzuela in 2018.
- Bacoor City beating Batangas City in two games marked the first time in league history in which both semifinals and division finals series concluded in two games.

==== MPBL finals ====
- For the first time since 2018, the MPBL finals featured two Luzon-based teams.
  - It was also the second consecutive season in which the finals featured a Central Luzon-based team, but not a Metro Manila-based team.
- Pampanga became the first team in league history to sweep a finals series.
  - Pampanga is also the first team to sweep every playoff series in a single season.

== Format ==
The top eight teams from each division advance to the playoffs. Seeding is based on wins, with tiebreaker rules applied should multiple teams have the same record. The single-elimination bracket consists of four rounds with no reseeding. The first three rounds being best-of-three series and the national finals being a best-of-five series.

During the first two rounds, two games within the same division are played in a gameday, with homecourt advantage alternating between the higher-seeded teams of each series. A traditional homecourt format is then used for the last two rounds, with the division finals using a 1–1–1 format and the national finals using a 2–2–1 format. The designated home team may not be able to play within its home locality. Should it occur, the gameday may take place elsewhere.

== Division standings ==
North Division

Pos	Team	Pld	W	L	GB
1	Pampanga Giant Lanterns	28	26	2	—
2	Nueva Ecija Rice Vanguards	28	23	5	3
3	Makati OKBet Kings	28	21	7	5
4	Caloocan Batang Kankaloo	28	20	8	6
5	Pasig City MCW Sports	28	19 (Note: Pasig wins tiebreaker over San Juan based on head-to-head victory.)	9	7
6	San Juan Knights	28	19	9	7
7	Pasay Voyagers	28	17	11	9
8	Marikina Shoemasters	28	16	12	10

Source: Standings
Notes:

South Division

Pos	Team	Pld	W	L	GB
1	Bacoor City Strikers	28	23	5	—
2	Batangas City Embassy Chill	28	22	6	1
3	GenSan Warriors	28	21	7	2
4	Zamboanga Family's Brand Sardines	28	20	8	3
5	Quezon Huskers	28	19	9	4
6	Muntinlupa Cagers	28	16	12	7
7	Imus SV Squad	28	15	13	8
8	Iloilo United Royals	28	12	16	11

Source: Standings

== Bracket ==
Teams in bold advanced to the next round. The numbers to the left of each team indicate the team's seeding in its division, and the numbers to the right indicate the number of games the team won in that round. Teams with homecourt advantage, the higher-seeded team, are shown in italics.

Division quarterfinals (best-of-3)	Division semifinals (best-of-3)
N1	**Pampanga**	**2**
N8	Marikina	0
N1	**Pampanga**	**2**
N4	Caloocan	0
N4	**Caloocan**	**2**
N5	Pasig City	1
**North Division**
N2	**Nueva Ecija**	**2**
N7	Pasay	0
N2	Nueva Ecija	0
N6	**San Juan**	**2**
N3	Makati	0
N6	**San Juan**	**2**
S1	**Bacoor City**	**2**
S8	Iloilo	1
S1	**Bacoor City**	**2**
S4	Zamboanga	0
S4	**Zamboanga**	**2**
S5	Quezon	1
**South Division**
S2	**Batangas City**	**2**
S7	Imus	0
S2	**Batangas City**	**2**
S3	General Santos	1
S3	**General Santos**	**2**
S6	Muntinlupa	1

Division finals (best-of-3)
N1	**Pampanga**	**2**
N6	San Juan	0
S1	**Bacoor City**	**2**
S2	Batangas City	0

National finals (best-of-5)
N1	**Pampanga**	**3**
S1	Bacoor City	0

== First round ==
=== North Division ===
==== (1) Pampanga Giant Lanterns vs. (8) Marikina Shoemasters ====
One PH
Media Pilipinas TV

October 6
08:00 pm

Boxscore

Marikina Shoemasters	70–82	Pampanga Giant Lanterns
Scoring by quarter: 21–21, 11–19, 20–14, 18–28
Pts: Joe Gomez de Liaño 22; Rebs: Jason Strait, Aldzahar Udjan 9 Asts: Felipe Chavez 6		Pts: Archie Concepcion 26; Rebs: Justine Baltazar 21; Asts: Justine Baltazar 7
Pampanga leads series, 1–0

Bren Z. Guiao Convention Center, San Fernando, Pampanga

This game featured the MPBL debut of 9-time PBA champion and Pampanga homegrown Arwind Santos. Santos only scored four points, including the buzzer-beating three-pointer at the end of the game.

Media Pilipinas TV

October 13
06:00 pm

Boxscore

Pampanga Giant Lanterns	81–61	Marikina Shoemasters
Scoring by quarter: 28–15, 18–17, 13–14, 22–15
Pts: Justine Baltazar 22; Rebs: Justine Baltazar 11; Asts: Archie Concepcion 7		Pts: Mark Atabay 16; Rebs: Mark Atabay 13; Asts: Deo Timajo 5
Pampanga wins series, 2–0

Caloocan Sports Complex, Caloocan

Head-to-head matchup

One PH
Media Pilipinas TV

May 19
8:00 pm

Boxscore

Marikina Shoemasters	75–83	Pampanga Giant Lanterns
Scoring by quarter: 25–26, 9–22, 15–19, 26–16
Pts: Marwin Dionisio 24; Rebs: Jason Opiso 8 Asts: Felipe Chavez 7		Pts: MJ Garcia 17; Rebs: Justine Baltazar 26; Asts: Justine Baltazar 5

Brenz Z. Guiao Convention Center,
San Fernando, Pampanga
Referees: Jovet Ocfemia, Rodel Brila, Severino Pingol

This is the first playoff meeting between Pampanga and Marikina.

==== (2) Nueva Ecija Rice Vanguards vs. (7) Pasay Voyagers ====
One PH
Media Pilipinas TV

October 9
08:00 pm

Boxscore

Pasay Voyagers	81–85	Nueva Ecija Rice Vanguards
Scoring by quarter: 17–21, 23–19, 22–21, 19–24
Pts: Dhon Reverente 20; Rebs: Dhon Reverente 13; Asts: Elvin Chan, Laurenz Victoria 4		Pts: Chris Bitoon 18; Rebs: Michael Mabulac 15; Asts: John Raymundo, Chris Bitoon 4
Nueva Ecija leads series, 1–0

Nueva Ecija Coliseum, Palayan, Nueva Ecija

Media Pilipinas TV

October 16
06:00 pm

Boxscore

Nueva Ecija Rice Vanguards	71–62	Pasay Voyagers
Scoring by quarter: 15–12, 23–13, 15–15, 18–22
Pts: Chris Bitoon 16; Rebs: JR Taganas 8 Asts: Philip Manalang 5		Pts: Brian Hilario 26; Rebs: Dhon Reverente 12; Asts: Laurenz Victoria 6
Nueva Ecija wins series, 2–0

Ynares Sports Arena, Pasig

Head-to-head matchup

One PH
Media Pilipinas TV

September 28
8:00 pm

Boxscore

Pasay Voyagers	79–88	Nueva Ecija Rice Vanguards
Scoring by quarter: 23–17, 18–23, 22–22, 16–26
Pts: Axel Iñigo, AJ Coronel 15; Rebs: Dhon Reverente 9 Asts: Lauenz Victoria 6		Pts: Jonathan Uyloan 18; Rebs: Stephen Siruma 9 Asts: Roi Sumang 6

Nueva Ecija Coliseum,
Palayan, Nueva Ecija

This is the first playoff meeting between Nueva Ecija and Pasay.

==== (3) Makati OKBet Kings vs. (6) San Juan Knights ====
This series marked the third meeting of coaches Don Dulay (Makati) and Randy Alcantara (San Juan). Both coaches met in back-to-back national finals and split one championship each, with Alcantara winning in 2019 for San Juan, and Dulay winning in 2021 for Davao Occidental.

Media Pilipinas TV

October 9
06:00 pm

Boxscore

Makati OKBet Kings	84–95	San Juan Knights
Scoring by quarter: 15–22, 16–21, 30–34, 23–18
Pts: Keith Agovida 19; Rebs: Keith Agovida 8 Asts: JC Cullar 6		Pts: Orlan Wamar 23; Rebs: Kevin Villafranca 7 Asts: Adrian Nocum 6
San Juan leads series, 1–0

Nueva Ecija Coliseum, Palayan, Nueva Ecija

One PH
Media Pilipinas TV

October 16
08:00 pm

Boxscore

San Juan Knights	95–92 (2OT)	Makati OKBet Kings
Scoring by quarter: 27–18, 13–19, 18–28, 17–10, Overtime: 20–17
Pts: Adrian Nocum 22; Rebs: Zach Huang 12; Asts: Orlan Wamar 7		Pts: Robby Celiz, Emman Calo 24; Rebs: Billy Ray Robles 12; Asts: Emman Calo 7
San Juan wins series, 2–0

Ynares Sports Arena, Pasig

The game was the first in MPBL playoffs history to feature more than one overtime period, with both Makati and San Juan causing multiple lead changes and deadlocks throughout the entire game.

During the second overtime period, San Juan went on a 7–1 scoring run culminating in a three-point field goal by Wamar as the Knights led by 5 heading into the final minute. Calo cut the lead to three with two free throws, and then Cullar attempted a three-pointer to potentially cause triple overtime, but the ball went in and out of the rim. San Juan kept the ball in possession for the remaining seconds as the Knights advance to their fourth consecutive division semifinals appearance.

Head-to-head matchup

One PH
Media Pilipinas TV

May 26
8:00 pm

Boxscore

Makati OKBet Kings	95–84	San Juan Knights
Scoring by quarter: 16–23, 19–15, 26–29, 34–17
Pts: JC Cullar 19; Rebs: Robby Celiz 8 Asts: Robby Celiz 6		Pts: Orlan Wamar Jr. 18; Rebs: Adrian Nocum 11; Asts: three players 4

Filoil EcoOil Centre,
San Juan
Referees: Jovet Ocfemia, Julius Tiquio, Cornel Tungol

This is the second playoff meeting between Makati and San Juan, with San Juan winning the previous meeting.

Previous playoffs series
San Juan leads 1–0 in all-time playoff series

2021

San Juan Knights 2, Makati Super Crunch 1

2020–21 Northern Division finals

==== (4) Caloocan Batang Kankaloo vs. (5) Pasig City MCW Sports ====
Media Pilipinas TV

October 6
06:00pm

Boxscore

Caloocan Batang Kankaloo	71–69	Pasig City MCW Sports
Scoring by quarter: 20–17, 7–17, 23–14, 21–21
Pts: Reil Cervantes 16; Rebs: Gabby Espinas 12; Asts: Joco Tayongtong 5		Pts: Robbie Manalang 17; Rebs: Pierce Chan 9 Asts: Ryan Costelo 5
Caloocan leads series, 1–0

Bren Z. Guiao Convention Center,
San Fernando, Pampanga

With the game tied at 69–69, Gabby Espinas hit the mid-range jumper on Jason Ballesteros to give Caloocan the lead with 0.7 seconds left on the clock. Following two timeouts from Pasig City, Kenny Rocacurva gave the inbound pass to Ryan Costelo, who failed to score a potential game-tying field goal.

One PH
Media Pilipinas TV

October 13
08:00 pm

Boxscore

Pasig City MCW Sports	65–61	Caloocan Batang Kankaloo
Scoring by quarter: 16–11, 11–18, 19–16, 19–16
Pts: Robbie Manalang 23; Rebs: Jason Ballesteros 10; Asts: Ryan Costelo 3		Pts: Paul Sanga 12; Rebs: Rey Cervantes, Gabby Espinas 7 Asts: Alejandro Iñigo 4
Series tied, 1–1

Caloocan Sports Complex, Caloocan

One PH
Media Pilipinas TV

October 20
08:00 pm

Boxscore

Caloocan Batang Kankaloo	68–60	Pasig City MCW Sports
Scoring by quarter: 17–16, 10–17, 20–14, 21–13
Pts: Gabby Espinas 15; Rebs: Gabby Espinas, Paul Sanga 7 Asts: Irven Palencia 5		Pts: Robbie Manalang, Rey Peralta 10; Rebs: Jason Ballesteros 17; Asts: three players 3
Caloocan wins series, 2–1

Caloocan Sports Complex, Caloocan

Head-to-head matchup

One PH
Media Pilipinas TV

May 10
8:00 pm

Boxscore

Caloocan Batang Kankaloo	74–82	Pasig City MCW Sports
Scoring by quarter: 13–18, 17–23, 21–27, 23–14
Pts: Jeramer Cabanag 16; Rebs: Ronnie Matias 11; Asts: Irven Palencia 7		Pts: Kenny Rocacurva 18; Rebs: Jason Ballesteros 13; Asts: Ryan Costelo 9

Ynares Sports Arena,
Pasig
Referees: Severino Pingol, Allan Manzano, Bayani Francisco

This is the first playoff meeting between Caloocan and Pasig.

=== South Division ===
==== (1) Bacoor City Strikers vs. (8) Iloilo United Royals ====
One PH
Media Pilipinas TV

October 7
08:00pm

Boxscore

Iloilo United Royals	89–86	Bacoor City Strikers
Scoring by quarter: 19–31, 18–26, 32–9, 20–20
Pts: Lorenzo Navarro 16; Rebs: Omar Larupay, Joshua Flores 10; Asts: Lorenzo Navarro 14		Pts: Jhan Nermal, James Kwekuteye 23; Rebs: Mark Yee 14; Asts: Yvan Ludovice 4
Iloilo leads series, 1–0

Strike Gymnasium, Bacoor, Cavite

At the end of the first half, Bacoor City had a 20-point lead on Iloilo. In the third quarter, Iloilo took the lead as the United Royals scored 32 points over Bacoor City's 9. With the game tied at 86–86, and with just under three seconds on the game clock, CJ Catapusan scored a three-point field goal to give Iloilo the lead with .17 seconds remaining. Bacoor City had no timeouts left as Chito Jaime attempted a half-court shot that hit the right side of the backboard, giving Iloilo the upset victory.

Media Pilipinas TV

October 14
06:00 pm

Boxscore

Bacoor City Strikers	92–52	Iloilo United Royals
Scoring by quarter: 20–11, 25–16, 22–10, 25–15
Pts: Chito Jaime 16; Rebs: Jhaymo Eguilos 10; Asts: Aaron Jeruta 9		Pts: CJ Catapusan 11; Rebs: CJ Catapusan, Omar Larupay 6 Asts: Lorenzo Navarro 7
Series tied, 1–1

Mayor Vitaliano D. Agan Coliseum, Zamboanga City

Media Pilipinas TV

October 21
8:00 pm

Boxscore

Iloilo United Royals	61–72	Bacoor City Strikers
Scoring by quarter: 12–22, 17–19, 15–17, 17–14
Pts: Joshua Flores 15; Rebs: CJ Catapusan 9 Asts: Lorenzo Navarro 8		Pts: James Kwekuteye 15; Rebs: Jhaymo Eguilos, Jhan Nermal 12; Asts: Aaron Jeruta 6
Bacoor City wins series, 2–1

Strike Gymnasium, Bacoor, Cavite

Head-to-head matchup

One PH
Media Pilipinas TV

June 13
8:00 pm

Boxscore

Iloilo United Royals	69–74 (OT)	Bacoor City Strikers
Scoring by quarter: 15–12, 14–9, 22–20, 14–24, Overtime: 4–9
Pts: Tony Ynot 16; Rebs: CJ Catapusan 13; Asts: CJ Catapusan 5		Pts: Jhan Nermal 24; Rebs: Jhan Nermal, Mark Yee 14; Asts: Joel Lee Yu 5

Strike Gymnasium,
Bacoor, Cavite
Referees: Edmar Avis, Rodel Brila, Bayani Francisco

This is the first playoff meeting between Bacoor City and Iloilo.

==== (2) Batangas City Embassy Chill vs. (7) Imus SV Squad ====
One PH
Media Pilipinas TV

October 10
08:00 pm

Boxscore

Imus SV Squad	71–78	Batangas City Embassy Chill
Scoring by quarter: 8–21, 20–23, 15–16, 28–18
Pts: Carlo Lastimosa 18; Rebs: Marc Pingris 10; Asts: six players 2		Pts: Juneric Baloria 17; Rebs: John Ambulodto 10; Asts: Jeckster Apinan 5
Batangas City leads series, 1–0

Batangas City Coliseum, Batangas City

Marc Pingris made his return to Imus after only playing for the team in five games during the regular season.

Media Pilipinas TV

October 17
06:00 pm

Boxscore

Batangas City Embassy Chill	61–59	Imus SV Squad
Scoring by quarter: 13–14, 15–18, 15–11, 18–16
Pts: Cedrick Ablaza 13; Rebs: Juneric Baloria 9 Asts: Juneric Baloria, Cedrick Ablaza 6		Pts: Carlo Lastimosa 11; Rebs: Marc Pingris 10; Asts: Jayjay Helterbrand 6
Batangas City wins series, 2–0

Strike Gymnasium, Bacoor, Cavite

Head-to-head matchup

One PH
Media Pilipinas TV

May 9
8:00 pm

Boxscore

Imus SV Squad	71–70	Batangas City Embassy Chill
Scoring by quarter: 19–6, 21–16, 34–23, 17–25
Pts: Jimboy Estrada 27; Rebs: Jaymar Gimpayan 12; Asts: Marc Pingris 5		Pts: Juneric Baloria 21; Rebs: four players 5 Asts: MJ dela Virgen 6

Batangas City Coliseum,
Batangas City
Referees: Romel Alcoran, Severino Pingol, Allan Manzano

This is the second playoff meeting between Batangas City and Imus, with Batangas City winning the previous meeting.

Previous playoffs series
Batangas City leads 1–0 in all-time playoff series

2019

Batangas City Athletics 2, Imus Bandera 1

2019 Southern Division First Round

==== (3) GenSan Warriors vs. (6) Muntinlupa Cagers ====
Media Pilipinas TV

October 10
06:00 pm

Boxscore

GenSan Warriors	79–70	Muntinlupa Cagers
Scoring by quarter: 21–13, 24–13, 18–19, 16–25
Pts: Jervy Cruz 16; Rebs: John Wilson 12; Asts: John Wilson 7		Pts: Dave Moralde 12; Rebs: Dave Moralde, Ian Melencio 10; Asts: Dave Moralde, Ian Melencio 4
General Santos leads series, 1–0

Batangas City Coliseum, Batangas City

One PH
Media Pilipinas TV

October 17
08:00 pm

Boxscore

Muntinlupa Cagers	99–91	GenSan Warriors
Scoring by quarter: 27–21, 31–20, 28–22, 13–28
Pts: Dave Moralde 18; Rebs: Ian Melencio 14; Asts: Ian Melencio 8		Pts: Mark Cruz 19; Rebs: Felix Apreku, Larry Rodriguez 6 Asts: Nico Elorde 6
Series tied, 1–1

Strike Gymnasium, Bacoor, Cavite

TBA

October 24
07:00 pm

Boxscore

GenSan Warriors	85–78	Muntinlupa Cagers
Scoring by quarter: 26–19, 18–15, 22–19, 19–25
Pts: John Wilson 22; Rebs: Hafer Mondragon 8 Asts: three players 5		Pts: John Amores 17; Rebs: JP Sarao 14; Asts: Ian Melencio 7
General Santos wins series, 2–1

Paco Arena, Manila

Head-to-head matchup

Media Pilipinas TV

June 10
6:00 pm

Boxscore

GenSan Warriors	60–67	'Muntinlupa Cagers
Scoring by quarter: 18–19, 17–16, 12–14, 13–18
Pts: Jervy Cruz 11; Rebs: Kyt Jimenez 7 Asts: Mark Cruz 6		Pts: Manuel Masqueda 13; Rebs: John Amores 9 Asts: three players 3

Batangas City Coliseum,
Batangas City
Referees: Edmar Avis, Julius Tiquio, Severino Pingol

This is the first playoff meeting between General Santos and Muntinlupa.

==== (4) Zamboanga Family's Brand Sardines vs. (5) Quezon Huskers ====
Media Pilipinas TV

October 7
06:00 pm

Boxscore

Quezon Huskers	68–77	Zamboanga Family's Brand Sardines
Scoring by quarter: 18–17, 15–22, 18–20, 17–18
Pts: Christopher Lagrama 16; Rebs: RJ Minerva 13; Asts: Thomas Torres 4		Pts: Jaycee Marcelino 20; Rebs: Jaycee Marcelino 10; Asts: Jaycee Marcelino 7
Zamboanga leads series, 1–0

Strike Gymnasium, Bacoor, Cavite

One PH
Media Pilipinas TV

October 14
08:00 pm

Boxscore

Zamboanga Family's Brand Sardines	58–65	Quezon Huskers
Scoring by quarter: 18–25, 15–5, 10–12, 15–23
Pts: Jaycee Marcelino 19; Rebs: Jaycee Marcelino 8 Asts: Jaycee Marcelino 3		Pts: Alex Tamsi 13; Rebs: Rodel Guevarra 9 Asts: Christopher Lagrama 5
Series tied, 1–1

Mayor Vitaliano D. Agan Coliseum, Zamboanga City

Media Pilipinas TV

October 21
06:00 pm

Boxscore

Quezon Huskers	76–88	Zamboanga Family's Brand Sardines
Scoring by quarter: 16–21, 21–28, 22–25, 17–14
Pts: Mon Abundo, Rodel Gravera 14; Rebs: Rodel Gravera 11; Asts: Mon Abundo 7		Pts: Judel Fuentes 19; Rebs: Joseph Gabayni 7 Asts: Jaycee Marcelino 13
Zamboanga wins series, 2–1

Strike Gymnasium, Bacoor, Cavite

Head-to-head matchup

One PH
Media Pilipinas TV

August 14
8:00 pm

Boxscore

Zamboanga Family's Brand Sardines	66–70	Quezon Huskers
Scoring by quarter: 17–16, 10–15, 14–20, 25–19
Pts: Jaycee Marcelino 22; Rebs: Jayvee Marcelino 7 Asts: Judel Fuentes 4		Pts: Al Francis Tamsi 19; Rebs: Jason Opiso 7 Asts: John Karlo Casino 6

Quezon Convention Center,
Lucena, Quezon
Referees: John Louie Saripe, Ryan Bernardo, Jayson Vipiloso

This is the first playoff meeting between Zamboanga and Quezon.

== Division semifinals ==
=== North Division ===
==== (1) Pampanga Giant Lanterns vs. (4) Caloocan Batang Kankaloo ====
One PH
Media Pilipinas TV

October 27
08:00 pm

Boxscore

Caloocan Batang Kankaloo	63–74	Pampanga Giant Lanterns
Scoring by quarter: 11–24, 15–19, 15–22, 22–9
Pts: Paul Sanga 17; Rebs: Ronnie Matias 6 Asts: Irven Palencia, Alejandro Iñigo 6		Pts: Justine Baltazar 17; Rebs: Justine Baltazar 14; Asts: MJ Garcia, John Lloyd Clemente 4
Pampanga wins series, 1–0

Bren Z. Guiao Convention Center,
San Fernando, Pampanga

Media Pilipinas TV

November 3
06:00 pm

Boxscore

Pampanga Giant Lanterns	93–77	Caloocan Batang Kankaloo
Scoring by quarter: 18–20, 24–18, 24–26, 27–13
Pts: Encho Serrano 22; Rebs: Justine Baltazar 20; Asts: Justine Baltazar 7		Pts: Reil Cervantes 16; Rebs: Ronnie Matias 10; Asts: Reil Cervantes, Irven Palencia 6
Pampanga wins series, 2–0

Nueva Ecija Coliseum, Palayan, Nueva Ecija

Head-to-head matchup

Media Pilipinas TV

May 15
06:00 pm

Boxscore

Caloocan Batang Kankaloo	68–76	Pampanga Giant Lanterns
Scoring by quarter: 16–26, 12–18, 20–19, 20–13
Pts: Reil Cervantes 16; Rebs: Gabby Espinas 11; Asts: Reil Cervantes, Jeramer Cabanag 3		Pts: Justine Baltazar 25; Rebs: Justine Baltazar 21; Asts: MJ Garcia 4

Strike Gymnasium,
Bacoor, Cavite

This is the first playoff meeting between Pampanga and Caloocan.

==== (2) Nueva Ecija Rice Vanguards vs. (6) San Juan Knights ====
Media Pilipinas TV

October 27
06:00 pm

Boxscore

Nueva Ecija Rice Vanguards	82–86	San Juan Knights
Scoring by quarter: 20–18, 28–18, 11–21, 23–29
Pts: Byron Villarias, Chris Bitoon 14; Rebs: Will McAloney, Michael Mabulac 8 Asts: Michael Juico 7		Pts: Orlan Wamar 19; Rebs: Michael Calisaan, Nikko Panganiban 9 Asts: Orlan Wamar 7
San Juan leads series, 1–0

Bren Z. Guiao Convention Center,
San Fernando, Pampanga

One PH
Media Pilipinas TV

November 3
08:00 pm

Boxscore

San Juan Knights	88–80	Nueva Ecija Rice Vanguards
Scoring by quarter: 26–25, 21–17, 23–21, 18–17
Pts: Michael Calisaan 30; Rebs: Michael Calisaan 18; Asts: Orlan Wamar, Nikko Panganiban 6		Pts: Will McAloney 21; Rebs: Michael Mabulac 9 Asts: three players 4
San Juan wins series, 2–0

Nueva Ecija Coliseum, Palayan, Nueva Ecija

Head-to-head matchup

One PH
Media Pilipinas TV

September 21
08:00 pm

Boxscore

San Juan Knights	97–99 (OT)	Nueva Ecija Rice Vanguards
Scoring by quarter: 21–17, 18–24, 32–26, 18–22, Overtime: 8–10
Pts: Orlan Wamar 19; Rebs: Adrian Nocum 9 Asts: Orlan Wamar 5		Pts: Will McAloney 20; Rebs: Will McAloney 14; Asts: three players 5

Nueva Ecija Coliseum,
Palayan, Nueva Ecija

This is the second playoff meeting between Nueva Ecija and San Juan, with Nueva Ecija winning the previous meeting.

Previous playoffs series
Nueva Ecija leads 1–0 in all-time playoff series

2022

Nueva Ecija Rice Vanguards 2, San Juan Knights 1

2022 Northern Division finals

=== South Division ===
==== (1) Bacoor City Strikers vs. (4) Zamboanga Family's Brand Sardines ====
One PH
Media Pilipinas TV

October 28
08:00 pm

Boxscore

Zamboanga Family's Brand Sardines	56–61	Bacoor City Strikers
Scoring by quarter: 17–16, 10–12, 10–18, 19–15
Pts: Jaycee Marcelino 18; Rebs: King Caralipio 10; Asts: Jaycee Marcelino 4		Pts: Jhan Nermal 20; Rebs: Jhaymo Eguilos 10; Asts: Aaron Jeruta 8
Bacoor City leads series, 1–0

Strike Gymnasium, Bacoor, Cavite

Media Pilipinas TV

November 4
06:00 pm

Boxscore

Bacoor City Strikers	78–72	Zamboanga Family's Brand Sardines
Scoring by quarter: 17–16, 19–12, 19–15, 23–29
Pts: Jhan Nermal 25; Rebs: Mark Yee 8 Asts: Aaron Jeruta 8		Pts: Jayvee Marcelino 16; Rebs: Jayvee Marcelino 11; Asts: Jaycee Marcelino 6
Bacoor City wins series, 2–0

Batangas City Coliseum, Batangas City

Head-to-head matchup

One PH
Media Pilipinas TV

September 27
08:00 pm

Boxscore

Zamboanga Family's Brand Sardines	92–81	Bacoor City Strikers
Scoring by quarter: 20–19, 28–14, 16–31, 28–17
Pts: Judel Fuentes 18; Rebs: Jaycee Marcelino 10; Asts: Jaycee Marcelino 6		Pts: Chito Jaime 20; Rebs: James Kwekuteye 8 Asts: Joel Lee Yu 6

Strike Gymnasium,
Bacoor, Cavite

This is the first playoff meeting between Bacoor City and Zamboanga.

==== (2) Batangas City Embassy Chill vs. (3) GenSan Warriors ====
Media Pilipinas TV

October 28
06:00 pm

Boxscore

Batangas City Embassy Chill	81–75	GenSan Warriors
Scoring by quarter: 17–19, 22–15, 20–18, 22–23
Pts: Levi Hernandez 21; Rebs: Jeckster Apinan 9 Asts: Cedric Ablaza 6		Pts: Mark Cruz 18; Rebs: Mark Cruz 6 Asts: Nico Elorde 4
Batangas City leads series, 1–0

Strike Gymnasium,
Bacoor, Cavite

One PH
Media Pilipinas TV

November 4
08:00 pm

Boxscore

GenSan Warriors	61–55	Batangas City Embassy Chill
Scoring by quarter: 16–8, 16–12, 14–24, 15–11
Pts: Lorenzo Joson 14; Rebs: John Wilson 10; Asts: three players 3		Pts: Levi Hernandez 13; Rebs: Jeckster Apinan 11; Asts: Jeckster Apinan, MJ dela Virgen 4
Series tied, 1–1

Batangas City Coliseum, Batangas City

One PH
Media Pilipinas TV

November 7
08:00 pm

Boxscore

Batangas City Embassy Chill	66–62	GenSan Warriors
Scoring by quarter: 21–11, 10–17, 18–18, 17–16
Pts: Levi Hernandez 14; Rebs: Dawn Ochea 10; Asts: MJ dela Virgen 5		Pts: Michole Sorela 15; Rebs: five players 4 Asts: Mark Cruz 6
Batangas City wins series, 2–1

Batangas City Coliseum, Batangas City

Despite Batangas City leading by 11 points early on, the game came down to the wire as General Santos caught up throughout the rest of the game. With under half a minute remaining, General Santos was trailing by two. Cruz first missed a layup but got back the ball and gave it to Sorela. Sorela attempted a corner three-pointer but was deflected by Importante and later became a shot clock violation against General Santos. After two made free throws from Ablaza, Joson missed his three pointer resulting in Batangas City winning the game and the series, thus making back-to-back division finals appearances.

Head-to-head matchup

One PH
Media Pilipinas TV

September 28
06:00 pm

Boxscore

Batangas City Embassy Chill	75–58	GenSan Warriors
Scoring by quarter: 15–13, 12–16, 18–20, 30–9
Pts: Juneric Baloria 15; Rebs: Jeckster Apinan 15; Asts: Jeckster Apinan 6		Pts: John Wilson 15; Rebs: Mark Cruz 10; Asts: Nico Elorde 5

Nueva Ecija Coliseum,
Palayan, Nueva Ecija

This is the first playoff meeting between Batangas City and General Santos.

== Division finals ==
=== North Division finals ===
==== (1) Pampanga Giant Lanterns vs. (6) San Juan Knights ====
One PH
Media Pilipinas TV

November 11
07:00 pm

Boxscore

Pampanga Giant Lanterns	86–82	San Juan Knights
Scoring by quarter: 24–20, 19–17, 18–21, 25–24
Pts: Justine Baltazar 23; Rebs: Justine Baltazar 20; Asts: Encho Serrano 6		Pts: Marwin Taywan 20; Rebs: Michael Calisaan 12; Asts: Orlan Wamar 7
Pampanga leads series, 1–0

Bren Z. Guiao Convention Center, San Fernando, Pampanga

One PH
Media Pilipinas TV

November 14
08:30 pm

Boxscore

San Juan Knights	76–82	Pampanga Giant Lanterns
Scoring by quarter: 29–12, 14–26, 27–19, 6–25
Pts: Marwin Taywan 18; Rebs: Adrian Nocum 10; Asts: Adrian Nocum 4		Pts: Encho Serrano, MJ Garcia 16; Rebs: Justine Baltazar 19; Asts: Justine Baltazar, Encho Serrano 7
Pampanga wins series, 2–0

Filoil EcoOil Centre, San Juan

This was San Juan's first playoff home game of the entire season, due to the Knights being the 6th-seeded team. During the first three quarters, San Juan have shown dominance for the majority of the game, leading by as much as 19 points and entering the fourth quarter with a 13-point lead.

Pampanga, however, didn't stand back, as they would start the quarter with a 16–1 scoring run to take the lead with just over three minutes left, with eight of those points coming from Encho Serrano. Although Taywan scored a layup to tie the game, Pampanga then went on a 9–3 scoring run to finish the game. Encho Serrano won Player of the Game honors as the Giant Lanterns remain undefeated in the playoffs and went on to advance to their very first MPBL finals appearance.

Head-to-head matchup

One PH
Media Pilipinas TV

September 30
06:00 pm

Boxscore

Pampanga Giant Lanterns	89–73	San Juan Knights
Scoring by quarter: 28–25, 20–14, 19–16, 20–18
Pts: John Lloyd Clemente 15; Rebs: Allen Liwag, Louie Sangalang 10; Asts: Encho Serrano, MJ Garcia 5		Pts: AC Soberano 17; Rebs: Kenneth Villapando 6 Asts: Nikko Panganiban, Renzo Subido 5

Quezon Convention Center,
Lucena City

This is the second playoff meeting between Pampanga and San Juan, with San Juan winning the previous meeting.

Previous playoffs series
San Juan leads 1–0 in all-time playoff series

2020

San Juan Knights 2, Pampanga Giant Lanterns 0

2020 Northern Division semifinals

=== South Division finals ===
==== (1) Bacoor City Strikers vs. (2) Batangas City Embassy Chill ====
One PH
Media Pilipinas TV

November 13
07:00 pm

Boxscore

Bacoor City Strikers	89–68	Batangas City Embassy Chill
Scoring by quarter: 27–18, 24–11, 17–11, 21–25
Pts: James Kwekuteye 25; Rebs: Mark Yee 10; Asts: Aaron Jeruta 5		Pts: Jeckster Apinan 15; Rebs: Jeckster Apinan 13; Asts: MJ dela Virgen 7
Bacoor City leads series, 1–0

Strike Gymnasium, Bacoor, Cavite

One PH
Media Pilipinas TV

November 17
07:00 pm

Boxscore

Batangas City Embassy Chill	49–54	Bacoor City Strikers
Scoring by quarter: 14–8, 7–15, 23–17, 5–14
Pts: Jeckster Apinan 11; Rebs: Cedric Ablaza 10; Asts: CJ Isit 6		Pts: Jhaymo Eguilos 9 Rebs: Mark Yee, James Kwekuteye 9 Asts: Yvan Ludovice, Aaron Jeruta 3
Bacoor City wins series, 2–0

Batangas City Coliseum, Batangas City

Head-to-head matchup

One PH
Media Pilipinas TV

August 12
08:00 pm

Boxscore

Batangas City Embassy Chill	64–71	Bacoor City Strikers
Scoring by quarter: 6–25, 27–13, 8–19, 23–14
Pts: Rhaffy Octobre 18; Rebs: Juneric Baloria 10; Asts: three players 3		Pts: Michael Cañete 15; Rebs: Jhan Nermal 12; Asts: Aaron Jeruta 3

Strike Gymnasium ,
Bacoor, Cavite

This is the second playoff meeting between Bacoor City and Batangas City, with Batangas City winning the previous meeting.

Previous playoffs series
Batangas City leads 1–0 in all-time playoff series

2022

Batangas City Embassy Chill 2, Bacoor City Strikers 1

2022 Southern Division First Round

== MPBL finals: (N1) Pampanga Giant Lanterns vs. (S1) Bacoor City Strikers ==
One PH
Media Pilipinas TV

November 25
07:00 pm

Boxscore

Pampanga Giant Lanterns	71–58	Bacoor City Strikers
Scoring by quarter: 21–7, 17–21, 15–9, 18–21
Pts: Kurt Reyson 21; Rebs: Justine Baltazar 16; Asts: Justine Baltazar 6		Pts: Jhaymo Eguilos, Jhan Nermal 16; Rebs: Mark Yee 8 Asts: three players 2
Pampanga leads series, 1–0

Bren Z. Guiao Convention Center, San Fernando, Pampanga

One PH
Media Pilipinas TV

November 28
07:00 pm

Boxscore

Pampanga Giant Lanterns	68–65	Bacoor City Strikers
Scoring by quarter: 14–12, 19–17, 17–20, 18–16
Pts: Justine Baltazar, Archie Concepcion 13; Rebs: Justine Baltazar 12; Asts: Justine Baltazar 6		Pts: James Kwekuteye 16; Rebs: Jhaymo Eguilos 9 Asts: Aaron Jeruta 4
Pampanga leads series, 2–0

Bren Z. Guiao Convention Center, San Fernando, Pampanga

One PH
Media Pilipinas TV

December 2
07:00 pm

Boxscore

Bacoor City Strikers	77–82	Pampanga Giant Lanterns
Scoring by quarter: 20–20, 11–11, 22–17, 24–34
Pts: Jhan Nermal 20; Rebs: Mark Yee 10; Asts: Yvan Ludovice, Michael Cañete 4		Pts: Encho Serrano 24; Rebs: Justine Baltazar 19; Asts: three players 5
Pampanga wins series, 3–0

Strike Gymnasium, Bacoor, Cavite

Head-to-head matchup

One PH
Media Pilipinas TV

July 22
06:00 pm

Boxscore

Pampanga Giant Lanterns	78–70	Bacoor City Strikers
Scoring by quarter: 24–12, 20–26, 15–16, 19–16
Pts: Encho Serrano 18; Rebs: Justine Baltazar 18; Asts: John Bryle Bahio 5		Pts: Jhan Nermal 19; Rebs: Jhan Nermal 9 Asts: Aaron Jeruta 4

Laguna Sports Complex,
Santa Cruz, Laguna

This is the first playoff meeting between Pampanga and Bacoor City.
