= National Collegiate Athletic Association (Philippines) =

Athletic association of ten colleges and universities in the Philippines

- Current season, competition or edition: NCAA Season 102
- Logo as of NCAA Season 101
- Founded: 1924; 102 years ago
- Founder: Regino Ylanan
- President: Aloysius Ma. A. Maranan (San Beda University)
- Sports fielded: 15
- Divisions: 2 (Seniors' and Juniors')
- No. of teams: 10
- Country: Philippines
- Most titles: Seniors' division: Mapúa Cardinals (21 titles) Juniors' division: San Beda Red Cubs (15 titles)
- Broadcaster: Cignal TV
- Related competitions: Philippine Collegiate Champions League; Shakey's Super League; Philippine University Games
- Website: www.ncaaph.com

The National Collegiate Athletic Association (NCAA; /ˌɛnsiː.eɪˈeɪ/ EN-see-AY-AY) is an athletic association of ten private colleges and universities in Metro Manila, Philippines. Established in 1924, it is the oldest collegiate athletic association in the country. The league is not affiliated with the NCAA of the United States, as such its referred to as NCAA Philippines.

== History ==
=== Early years (1924–1959) ===
The NCAA was founded in 1924 on the initiative of Regino R. Ylanan, a physical education professor of the University of the Philippines (UP). The original members were Ateneo de Manila, De La Salle College, the Institute of Accounts (now known as Far Eastern University), National University (NU), San Beda College (SBC; now known as San Beda University), the University of Manila, University of the Philippines Manila, and the University of Santo Tomas (UST).

The decision of the board of directors to file papers of incorporation with the then Bureau of Commerce in 1930 led to protests from the University of the Philippines, which was the only public institution among member schools, saying that it would lead to commercialization. National University and the University of Santo Tomas sided with the University of the Philippines on the matter. This led into the formation, via an Article of Agreement, of a triangular meet among NU, UP and UST, with the Board of Control's condition that NCAA events should take precedence. The league established came to be known as the "Big Three," and in 1932, the Article of Agreement was renewed.

In 1936, UP Manila, NU, and UST withdrew permanently from the NCAA and continued with their own league, while FEU withdrew on its own. Six schools remained in the league and became known as the "old-timer six: Ateneo, Colegio de San Juan de Letran, De La Salle, José Rizal College, Mapúa Institute of Technology and San Beda. Also in 1936, league's basketball games were transferred to the newly completed Rizal Memorial Coliseum, owing to its accessibility among the schools, since most schools were in Manila.

The NCAA experienced a golden age during the postwar years. The Loyola Center at the Ateneo campus became the new home of the association. Due to the home court advantage of the Ateneo, Blue Eagles' games were held at Rizal Memorial.

=== An era of turbulence (1960–1983) ===
By the 1960s, the league experienced problems such as eligibility of players and interscholastic hooliganism. This led to disagreements among member schools, and as a result the 1962–63 season was suspended, and the following two seasons were held in a loose conference format, where the home and away system was used. San Sebastian College – Recoletos joined the league in 1969. Trinity College of Quezon City (now Trinity University of Asia) also joined in 1974, the league's golden anniversary, according to newspapers and other publications of that year.

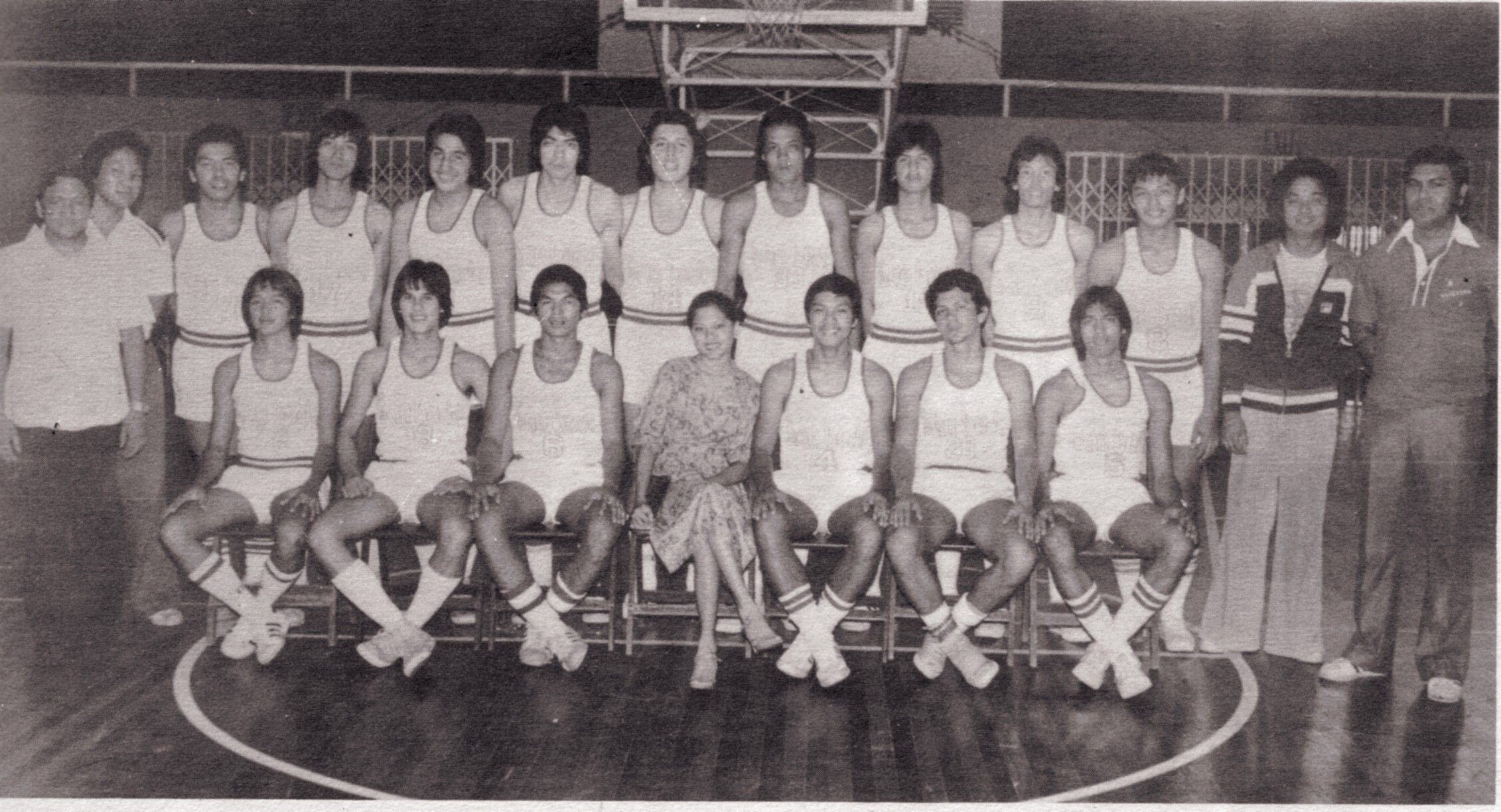
The 1978 San Beda Red Lions, NCAA seniors' basketball back to back champions.

After the riotous games of the late 1970s, several of the founding members left the league. Ateneo left the league in 1978, which also marred a championship series with San Beda, while La Salle left after a riotous game with Letran in 1980. Both schools were later admitted into the rival University Athletic Association of the Philippines (UAAP) in 1978 and 1986, respectively. San Beda also left in 1983 to put more focus on its intraschool activities.

Due to Ateneo's move to the UAAP, NCAA games returned to the old Rizal Memorial and to the PhilSports Arena. Also with the withdrawal of the three founding members, most daily publications tagged the NCAA as "an ironic journey from sports to violence."

=== The first expansion era (1984–2008) ===
As the league was reduced to four members, new membership was actively pursued. Perpetual Help College of Rizal (now known as University of Perpetual Help System DALTA) was accepted as a member in 1984, whle San Beda returned in 1986 after a three-year hiatus. On the other hand, Trinity was not able to meet league requirements and left in 1986. The additions of Philippine Christian University (PCU) and De La Salle-College of Saint Benilde (DLS-CSB) in the late 1990s brought the league membership to eight schools. During this time, measures were taken to prevent major brawls from starting such as the patrolling by the respective faculties of the member schools, to control the behavior of the crowd were implemented as part of the remedy to ensure the security during the NCAA games.

In 1998, the affiliated schools in the Calabarzon region and southern Metro Manila established NCAA South, an offshoot of the league. The NCAA has also set plans for a Division II, which would be composed of newly admitted schools. The league has already visited and issued invitations to schools such as Arellano University, Emilio Aguinaldo College and the Lyceum of the Philippines University.

The return of a Mapúa Juniors team, which took a leave of absence beginning Season 81 (2005–06) was scheduled in Season 83 (2007–08). Malayan High School would represent the Mapúa Institute of Technology in the Juniors Division of the NCAA. This newly established high school would only be fully operational by school year 2007–08. However, the scheduled return of the Mapua Junior varsity team did not materialize and instead it resumed participation in Season 84 (2008–09).

=== The second expansion era (2009–2023) ===
After it was revealed that several players of the PCU juniors' basketball team enrolled with spurious documents, PCU's seniors and juniors teams were suspended for the 2007–08 season. The seniors teams were permitted to participate in the 2008–09 season, but all PCU teams subsequently took an indefinite leave of absence beginning with the 2009–10 season.

In place of PCU, the Management Committee invited guest teams to fill out the league roster. Angeles University Foundation (AUF), Arellano University (AU), and Emilio Aguinaldo College (EAC) were brought in as guest teams eligible to win championships. In Season 86, AU's and EAC's status were upgraded to probationary membership. Lyceum of the Philippines University (LPU), which had earlier sought membership, joined as a guest team in Season 87 (2011–12). Arellano became a regular member in Season 89 (2013–14) after meeting the league requirements, followed by EAC and Lyceum in Season 91 (2015–16). The association now had ten full member schools, its largest in history.

=== The second century (2024–present) ===
The NCAA entered its second century with Season 100, held during the 2024–25 academic year. The centennial season was hosted by Lyceum of the Philippines University and carried the theme “Siglo Uno: Inspiring Legacies." The season officially opened on September 7, 2024, at the Mall of Asia Arena and featured the league’s ten member schools. The centennial celebrations included activities commemorating the history of the association and recognizing notable athletes and contributors to the league.

In men’s basketball, Mapúa University won the Season 100 championship, defeating De La Salle–College of Saint Benilde in the finals. The championship was Mapúa’s sixth in men’s basketball and its first since 1991, ending a 33-year championship drought. The victory also marked the first time since 2009 that a team other than San Beda University or Colegio de San Juan de Letran won the men’s basketball championship.

Season 100 continued the NCAA’s competitions across its established sporting events and further developed its esports program. The centennial season also marked the transition from the league’s first 100 seasons to its second century of collegiate competition.

NCAA Season 101, held during the 2025–26 academic year, was hosted by Mapúa University and carried the theme “Building Greatness.” The season opened on October 1, 2025, at the Smart Araneta Coliseum, with the ten member schools participating. Season 101 introduced a new tournament format for men’s basketball and volleyball. The ten schools were divided into two groups of five teams. Each team played the other teams in its own group twice and the teams in the opposing group once. The fourth- and fifth-placed teams in each group then competed in a play-in, while the top two teams in each group received a twice-to-beat advantage in the quarterfinals. The semifinals and finals were played as best-of-three series.

In men’s basketball, San Beda University won the Season 101 championship, defeating Letran in the finals. San Beda won the series in two games, giving the Red Lions their 24th NCAA men’s basketball championship, the most in league history. Bryan Sajonia was named Finals MVP. Season 101 also saw Letran win the women’s volleyball championship, while San Beda won both the men’s and women’s beach volleyball championships.

Ahead of Season 101, the association also introduced changes to its visual identity. A logo making contest was held by the NCAA, with the winning design submitted by Jeffrey Salut.

NCAA Season 102, held during the 2026–27 academic year, is hosted by San Beda University. The season opened on September 13, 2026, at the Mall of Asia Arena, with San Beda entering as the defending men’s basketball champion. The league retained its ten-school membership and continued the group-stage format introduced in Season 101.

For Season 102, the basketball tournament format was modified to give the fourth-placed team in each group a twice-to-beat advantage over the fifth-placed team in the play-in round. The group stage retained its three-phase structure, with teams first playing within their respective groups, crossing over to the other group, and then returning to their original group. The change modified the Season 101 format, in which the fourth- and fifth-placed teams played a single knockout game without an advantage.

Season 102 continues the NCAA’s development during the early years of its second century, following the centennial celebrations of Season 100 and the tournament-format changes introduced in Season 101. The association continues to operate with ten member schools while maintaining and modifying its collegiate sports competitions.

== Member schools ==
The number and composition of NCAA members has changed over the years. The association is currently composed of the following schools, with their corresponding team names, affiliation, and year of admission.

Colors	School	Location	Founded	Joined	Type	Seniors' division	Juniors' division
	Arellano University	Manila	1938	2009	Private	Chiefs, Lady Chiefs and Braves	
	Colegio de San Juan de Letran	Manila	1620	1936 (Note: Letran first joined the NCAA in 1926, withdrew in 1933, and returned in 1936.)	Private (Dominican)	Knights, Lady Knights and Squires	
	De La Salle-College of Saint Benilde	Manila	1988	1998	Private (Lasallian)	Blazers and Lady Blazers	—N/a
	La Salle Green Hills	Mandaluyong	1959	1998 (Note: LSGH first joined the NCAA in 1968, withdrew in 1981, and returned in 1998.)	Private (Lasallian)	—N/a	Greenies
	Emilio Aguinaldo College	Manila	1957	2009	Private	Generals and Lady Generals	—N/a
	Immaculate Conception Academy	Dasmariñas, Cavite	1947	2009	Private	—N/a	Brigadiers
	José Rizal University	Mandaluyong	1919	1927	Private	Heavy Bombers, Lady Bombers and Light Bombers	
	Lyceum of the Philippines University	Manila	1952	2011	Private	Pirates and Lady Pirates	—N/a
	Lyceum of the Philippines University – Cavite (Note: The lack of a high school varsity program prevented Lyceum from being a guest member for Season 85. In Season 87, the high school program of Lyceum of the Philippines University–Cavite was accepted as the juniors team of Lyceum.)	General Trias, Cavite	2008	2011	Private	—N/a	Junior Pirates
	Mapúa University	Manila	1925	1930	Private	Cardinals and Lady Cardinals	—N/a
	Malayan High School of Science (Note: Malayan High School of Science represents Mapúa in the juniors' division since 2008. Mapúa was formerly represented by its high school until 2005.)	Manila	2005	2008	Private	—N/a	Red Robins
	San Beda University (Note: San Beda's basic education unit is in its Taytay campus)	Manila	1901	1986 (Note: San Beda first joined the NCAA in 1924, withdrew in 1983, and returned in 1986.)	Private (Benedictine)	Red Lions, Red Lionesses and Red Cubs	
	San Beda University	Taytay, Rizal	2004	1986	Private (Benedictine)	Red Lions, Red Lionesses and Red Cubs	
	San Sebastian College – Recoletos	Manila	1941	1969	Private (Augustinian Recollect)	Golden Stags, Lady Stags and Staglets	
	University of Perpetual Help System DALTA	Las Piñas	1975	1984	Private	Altas, Lady Altas and Junior Altas	

=== Guest schools ===
The NCAA first invited guest teams in 2009 following the withdrawal of PCU a year prior. The original batch was composed of Angeles University Foundation, Arellano University and Emilio Aguinaldo College, with the latter two member schools obtaining full membership status two years later in 2011. Another current member, Lyceum of the Philippines University, originally joined as a guest in 2011 before becoming a full member in 2012.

Starting from Season 101, the association once again invited guest teams, but only for specific events.

School	Location	Type	Years active	Guest membership
Angeles University Foundation	Angeles City	Private	2009–2010	All sports
Centro Escolar University	Manila	Private	2026–present	Esports
Our Lady of Fatima University	Valenzuela	Private	2026–present	Esports
University of Asia and the Pacific	Pasig	Private	2026–present	Golf

=== Former full member schools ===
The following schools were once full members of the NCAA but have since departed from the league.

School	Location	Founded	Joined	Left	Type	Current association
Ateneo de Manila University	Quezon City	1859	1924	1978	Private (Jesuit)	UAAP
De La Salle University	Manila	1911	1924	1981	Private (Lasallian)	UAAP
Far Eastern University	Manila	1928	1924	1936	Private	UAAP
National University	Manila	1900	1924	1936	Private	UAAP
University of Manila	Manila	1913	1924	1926	Private	—N/a
University of the Philippines Manila	Manila	1908	1924	1936	Public	—N/a
University of Santo Tomas	Manila	1611	1924	1936	Private (Dominican)	UAAP
St. Vincent de Paul College	Manila	—	1925	1926	Private	—N/a
Trinity University of Asia	Quezon City	1963	1974	1986	Private	ISAA
Philippine Christian University	Manila	1946	1996	2009	Private	NAASCU

== Structure and hosting ==
Previous logos used by the NCAA from 1999 to 2004 (top) and from 2005 to 2025 (bottom).

The Policy Board, composed of the presidents of member schools, manages the NCAA's external and internal affairs. It handles matters such as acceptance, replacement, and suspension of member schools. The NCAA presidency rotates among member schools.

The other main administrative body in the NCAA is the Management Committee (MANCOM), which determines matters of athletic concern, such as determining the proper conditions for playing, suspension of players, coaches, and referees, reversal or review of game results, and investigation of ineligible players. The Management Committee is composed of the athletics moderators (or athletic directors) of the member schools, who are selected by their respective university presidents, and the league chairperson, who is selected by the Policy Board. Like the league president, the chair of the Management Committee rotates among member schools.

The president of the Policy Board and the chairperson of the Management committee come from the school currently hosting the basketball tournament. The host school manages the logistics, expenses, labor and security in the venues. Each sport has its own host, with the host for basketball being the head of all hosts. Since Season 91 (2015–16), the rotation is based on alphabetical order of the schools. For Season 101 (2025–26), Mapúa University is the host school.

=== Sports ===
Member schools (red) and playing venues (blue) of the NCAA.
Schools in the University Belt area.

The NCAA sponsors thirteen (juniors) and fourteen (seniors) sports, which are divided into two divisions: the Juniors division for high school students and the Seniors division for college students. There are male and female Seniors divisions for some events.

Each member college or university has an affiliated high school that competes in the Juniors division. For example, San Beda University's affiliated high school is its campus at Taytay, Rizal, while Colegio de San Juan de Letran's high school is found within its college campus at Intramuros. While these two high schools are integrated within their colleges, De La Salle-College of Saint Benilde is not directly connected with its high school affiliate, La Salle Green Hills (LSGH), except that they are both administered by the Lasallian Brothers. As a result, DLSU-CSB labels "St. Benilde" instead of "La Salle" on their jerseys.

The NCAA sponsors the following sports for Juniors and Seniors: basketball, soccer, poomsae, swimming, taekwondo, track and field, chess, tennis (lawn and soft), table tennis, badminton, volleyball, and beach volleyball. The last three sporting events have a women's division.

In the 87th season of the NCAA, cheerleading has been upgraded to a "regular sport" which means it will contribute points in the overall championship race. In the 91st season of the league, poomsae was added as a "demonstration sport" being part of the taekwondo event.

The General Champion for the each division in an academic year is determined by a points system similar to the one used in Formula One, where the school with the highest accumulated score from all events in a division wins the General Championship. A championship in an event entitles a school with 40 points, the second placer 30, up to eighth place, with five points. For an example, see the tabulation of points for Season 84.

Currently, the De La Salle-College of Saint Benilde, San Beda University and Arellano University compete in all Seniors' sports, while La Salle Green Hills, San Beda College-Rizal and University of Perpetual Help System DALTA participates in all Juniors' sports.

NCAA championships

- General Championship
- Badminton
- Basketball - list of champions
- 3x3 Basketball
- Beach volleyball
- Cheerleading
- Chess
- Football
- Lawn tennis
- Soft Tennis
- Softball (discontinued)
- Swimming
- Street Dance
- Table tennis
- Taekwondo
- Track and field
- Volleyball

== Media coverage ==
=== Pre-2002 ===
During the 1980s and early to mid-1990s, the NCAA did not have a television broadcast partner due to the association's reputation at the time with the constant brawls during games. In 1998, Vintage Television, a longtime broadcast partner of the Philippine Basketball Association, picked up the broadcast rights to the league and aired them on IBC. In 2000, the association then switched partners to the MCI group, which then aired one game per playing day on People's Television Network. In 2001, the association switched partners again, this time to Silverstar Sports.

=== 2002–2020 ===
After four years of constantly switching broadcast partners, on March 18, 2002, the league found a long-term home in ABS-CBN, who also held the rights to the UAAP. Under ABS-CBN, the association received extensive coverage of basketball games. The network would later expand its broadcasts to its international arm, The Filipino Channel. ABS-CBN's partnership lasted for ten seasons from Season 78 to Season 87.

On April 22, 2012, ahead of Season 88, the association entered a new partnership with the TV5 Network through Sports5 and AKTV as part of a blocktime deal it had with IBC. The network aired a majority of games on AKTV with the main TV5 channel airing the finals. After the blocktime agreement ended in 2013 due to high costs, the games were moved to AksyonTV. Due to the poor reach of the channel, resulting in complaints from viewers, selected games were also aired on TV5 in 2014. Despite this, issues in regards to the coverage persisted, which is elevated due to the network's existing partnership with the PBA.

Before the start of Season 91 in 2015, the league reunited with ABS-CBN for what was originally set to be another ten-year deal, lasting through Season 100. However, the deal was cut short due to the loss of the congressional franchise of ABS-CBN.

=== 2021–present ===
Seeking a new partner following the controversial shutdown, the NCAA secured a six-year-long partnership with GMA Network starting from Season 96 in 2021. After Season 101 ended in 2026, GMA opted to not renew their partnership, thus a bid began to decide the association's next partner. In the end, TV5 Network, which entered a partnership with the UAAP in 2020, reclaimed the broadcast rights through Cignal TV, beating ABS-CBN, PTV, and the Bilyonaryo News Channel. The deal will initially last for two years through 2028, covering Season 102 and Season 103.

== See also ==
- List of NCAA Philippines seasons
- National Collegiate Athletic Association (Philippines) South
- Men's National Collegiate Athletic Association
- Women's National Collegiate Athletic Association
- University Athletic Association of the Philippines
