= NCAA Street Dance Competition =

New annual event

- Sport: Street dance
- Founded: 2024
- No. of teams: 20 teams: 10 - Seniors; 10 - Juniors
- Country: Philippines
- Most recent champions: Season 100 (2025) Seniors – LPU Wildstyle Crew Juniors – Junior Perpetual Dance Company

The NCAA Street Dance Competition is a new annual event of the National Collegiate Athletic Association (Philippines). It was inaugurated on December 12, 2024, at 2 PM at the FilOil EcoOil Center.

== Participants ==
=== Seniors division ===
School	Street Dance Team
Arellano University (AU)	
Colegio de San Juan de Letran (CSJL)	Letran Chevaliers Uknighted
De La Salle–College of Saint Benilde (DLS–CSB)	Saint Benilde Romançon Dance Company-Hiphop (SBRDC-HH)
Emilio Aguinaldo College (EAC)	EAC Yaman Lahi Dance Artist
José Rizal University (JRU)	José Rizal University Dance Troupe
Lyceum of the Philippines (LPU)	Lyceum of the Philippines University Wildstyle Crew
Mapúa University (MU)	Mapúa XDC
San Beda University (SBU)	Bedan Dance Theatre
San Sebastian College–Recoletos (SSC–R)	
University of Perpetual Help System DALTA (UPHSD)	University of Perpetual Help System Dalta – Dance Company

=== Juniors division ===
School	Street Dance Team
Arellano University (AU)	AU Street Chiefs
Colegio de San Juan de Letran (CSJL)	Letran Squires Uknighted
Emilio Aguinaldo College (EAC)	EAC Yaman Lahi Dance Artist
José Rizal University (JRU)	Indayog sa Ritmo
La Salle Green Hills (LSGH)	La Salle Green Hills Airforce
Lyceum of the Philippines University–Cavite (LPU–C)	Lyceum of the Philippines University Layag Dance Crew
Malayan High School of Science (MHSS)	Mapúa Junior Dance Troupe
San Beda University–Rizal (SBU–R)	Vasileia Dance Team
San Sebastian College–Recoletos (SSC–R)	
University of Perpetual Help System DALTA (UPHSD)	Junior Perpetual Dance Company

== Results ==
=== Seniors' division ===
Year	Season host	Venue	Champion	2nd place	3rd place	4th place	5th place	6th place	7th place	8th place	9th place	10th place	Ref.
2024–25	Lyceum	Filoil EcoOil Centre; San Juan, Metro Manila	Lyceum; 91.60	Benilde; 90.60	JRU; 89.00	San Beda; 88.90				Mapúa; 79.00			

=== Juniors' division ===
Year	Season host	Venue	Champion	2nd place	3rd place	4th place	5th place	6th place	7th place	8th place	9th place	10th place	Ref.
2024–25	Lyceum	Filoil EcoOil Centre; San Juan, Metro Manila	Perpetual; 86.20	Lyceum; 84.20	JRU; 82.60		Mapúa; 79.20		Benilde				

== Championship table ==
=== Seniors division ===
School	Last Championship	Last Top 3 Appearance	Rank			Total
School	Last Championship	Last Top 3 Appearance	1st place, gold medalist(s)	2nd place, silver medalist(s)	3rd place, bronze medalist(s)	Total
Lyceum of the Philippines University	2024	2024	1	0	0	1
De La Salle–College of Saint Benilde	–	2024	0	1	0	1
José Rizal University	–	2024	0	0	1	1
Arellano University	–	–	0	0	0	0
Colegio de San Juan de Letran	–	–	0	0	0	0
Emilio Aguinaldo College	–	–	0	0	0	0
Mapúa University	–	–	0	0	0	0
San Beda University	–	–	0	0	0	0
San Sebastian College–Recoletos	–	–	0	0	0	0
University of Perpetual Help System DALTA	–	–	0	0	0	0

=== Juniors division ===
School	Last Championship	Last Top 3 Appearance	Rank			Total
School	Last Championship	Last Top 3 Appearance	1st place, gold medalist(s)	2nd place, silver medalist(s)	3rd place, bronze medalist(s)	Total
University of Perpetual Help System DALTA	2024	2024	1	0	0	1
Lyceum of the Philippines University–Cavite	–	2024	0	1	0	1
José Rizal University	–	2024	0	0	1	1
Arellano University	–	–	0	0	0	0
Colegio de San Juan de Letran	–	–	0	0	0	0
EAC–Immaculate Conception Academy	–	–	0	0	0	0
La Salle Green Hills	–	–	0	0	0	0
Malayan High School of Science	–	–	0	0	0	0
San Beda University–Rizal	–	–	0	0	0	0
San Sebastian College–Recoletos	–	–	0	0	0	0

== See also ==
- NCAA Cheerleading Competition
- UAAP Street Dance Competition
