= NCAA Season 101 =

2025–26 Philippine college basketball season

- "Building Greatness"
- Host school: Mapúa University

Overall
- Seniors: De La Salle–College of Saint Benilde
- Juniors: San Beda–Rizal

Seniors' champions
Sport		Men	Women
Basketball		San Beda	NT
Volleyball		Benilde	Letran
Swimming		San Beda	San Beda
Taekwondo		Benilde	San Beda
Chess		Benilde	NT
Badminton		Benilde	San Beda
Beach volleyball		San Beda	San Beda
Table tennis		Benilde	Benilde
Football		San Beda	NT
Lawn tennis		Benilde	Benilde
Soft tennis		Perpetual	Benilde
3x3 basketball		JRU	NT
Track and field		Mapúa	NT
Golf		Benilde	NT
Esports		Lyceum	
- Poomsae: Benilde (Coed)
- Cheerdance: Arellano (Ex - Coed)

Juniors' champions
Sport		Boys	Girls
Basketball		Letran	NT
Volleyball		Malayan	Perpetual
Swimming		LSGH	NT
Taekwondo		San Beda–Rizal	NT
Chess		San Beda–Rizal	NT
Badminton		San Sebastian	NT
Beach volleyball		Letran	NT
Table tennis		San Beda–Rizal	NT
Lawn tennis		Malayan	NT
Soft tennis		Perpetual	NT
3x3 basketball		JRU	NT
Kiddie basketball		EAC–ICA	NT
Track and field		JRU	NT
- (NT) = No tournament; (DS) = Demonstration Sport; (Ex) = Exhibition;

NCAA Season 101 was the 101st season of the National Collegiate Athletic Association (NCAA) of the Philippines. Held during the 2025–26 academic year, the season is hosted by Mapúa University. The opening ceremony was held on October 1, 2025, at the Smart Araneta Coliseum.

== Background ==
=== Logo ===
On August 25, 2025, the NCAA announced a new logo that was created as part of a logo-making contest. The new logo was created by Jeffrey Salut and uses "NCAA Philippines" for the wordmark similar to that of the Season 100 logo.

== Basketball ==
With Metro Manila hosting the 2025 FIVB Men's Volleyball World Championship, the NCAA decided to delay the opening ceremonies to October 1. In order to finish the season in December, the NCAA also decided to change the tournament format for this season, mixing elements of the NBA play-in tournament and the U.S. NCAA Division I men's basketball tournament.

=== Men's tournament ===
==== Group stage ====
===== Group A =====
Pos	Team	W	L	PCT	GB	Qualification
1	Perpetual Altas	9	4	.692	—	Twice-to-beat in the quarterfinals
2	Arellano Chiefs	7	6	.538 (Note: Head-to-head record: Arellano 1–1 Mapua (Arellano +1))	2	Twice-to-beat in the quarterfinals
3	Mapúa Cardinals (H)	7	6	.538	2	Twice-to-win in the quarterfinals
4	Lyceum Pirates	3	10	.231 (Note: Head-to-head record: Lyceum 1–1 San Sebastian (Lyceum +8))	6	Proceed to play-in game
5	San Sebastian Stags	3	10	.231	6	Proceed to play-in game

Source: Rappler
(H) Hosts

===== Group B =====
Pos	Team	W	L	PCT	GB	Qualification
1	San Beda Red Lions	9	4	.692 (Note: Head-to-head record: San Beda 2–0 Benilde)	—	Twice-to-beat in the quarterfinals
2	Benilde Blazers	9	4	.692	—	Twice-to-beat in the quarterfinals
3	Letran Knights	8	5	.615	1	Twice-to-win in the quarterfinals
4	JRU Heavy Bombers	6	7	.462	3	Proceed to play-in game
5	EAC Generals	4	9	.308	5	Proceed to play-in game

Source: Rappler

==== Playoffs ====
Play-in games (Single-elimination)
B4	JRU	80
B5	EAC	76
A4	Lyceum	70
A5	San Sebastian	63

Quarterfinals (Top 2 twice-to-beat)
A1	Perpetual	81
B4	JRU	74
A2	Arellano	78	69
B3	Letran	87	77
B1	San Beda	91
A4	Lyceum	67
B2	Benilde	58	74
A3	Mapúa	73	72

Semifinals (Best-of-three playoff)
A1	Perpetual	73	70
B3	Letran	77	74
B1	San Beda	91	75	84
B2	Benilde	72	77	81

Finals (Best-of-three playoff)
B3	Letran	70	73
B1	San Beda	89	81
Third place playoff
A1	Perpetual	87
B2	Benilde	75

==== Awards ====
- Most Valuable Player: Allen Liwag (Benilde Blazers)
- Rookie of the Year: Jonathan Manalili (Letran Knights)

=== Juniors' tournament ===
==== Group stage ====
===== Group A =====
Pos	Team	W	L	PCT	GB	Qualification
1	Mapúa Red Robins (H)	9	4	.692	—	Twice-to-beat in the quarterfinals
2	Arellano Braves	8	5	.615	1	Twice-to-beat in the quarterfinals
3	Perpetual Junior Altas	6	7	.462	3	Twice-to-win in the quarterfinals
4	Lyceum Junior Pirates	4	9	.308 (Note: Head-to-head record: San Sebastian 1–1 Lyceum (Lyceum +3))	5	Advance to play-in game
5	San Sebastian Staglets	4	9	.308	5	Advance to play-in game

(H) Hosts

===== Group B =====
Pos	Team	W	L	PCT	GB	Qualification
1	EAC–ICA Brigadiers	10	3	.769	—	Twice-to-beat in the quarterfinals
2	Letran Squires	7	6	.538 (Note: Head-to-head record: Letran 2–0 LSGH)	3	Twice-to-beat in the quarterfinals
3	La Salle Green Hills Greenies	7	6	.538	3	Twice-to-win in the quarterfinals
4	San Beda Red Cubs	6	7	.462	4	Advance to play-in game
5	JRU Light Bombers	4	9	.308	6	Advance to play-in game

==== Playoffs ====
Play-in games (Single-elimination)
B4	San Beda	75
B5	JRU	69
A4	Lyceum	80
A5	San Sebastian	85*

Quarterfinals (Top 2 twice-to-beat)
A1	Mapúa	69
B4	San Beda	59
A2	Arellano	86
B3	LSGH	79
B1	EAC	71
A5	San Sebastian	70
B2	Letran	69	70
A3	Perpetual	74*	65

Semifinals (Best-of-three playoff)
A1	Mapúa	90	86	107
A2	Arellano	99	82	109**
B1	EAC	76	75	68
B2	Letran	77	70	77

Finals (Best-of-three playoff)
A2	Arellano	79	88
B2	Letran	85	91*
Third place playoff
A1	Mapúa	84
B1	EAC	74

*Overtime; number of asterisks denotes the number of overtime periods.

==== Awards ====
- Most Valuable Player: Sean Franco (Arellano Braves)
- Rookie of the Year: Josef Calo-oy (La Salle Green Hills Greenies)

== Volleyball ==
=== Men's tournament ===
==== Group stage ====
===== Group A =====
Pos	Team	Pld	W	L	Pts	SW	SL	SR	SPW	SPL	SPR	Qualification
1	Perpetual Altas Spikers	13	10	3	29	34	17	2.000	892	823	1.084	Twice-to-beat in the quarterfinals
2	Benilde Blazing Spikers	13	9	4	28	31	18	1.722	872	758	1.150	Twice-to-beat in the quarterfinals
3	Mapúa Cardinals	13	7	6	22	27	22	1.227	810	795	1.019	Twice-to-win in the quarterfinals
4	San Sebastian Stags	13	5	8	14	18	29	0.621	683	735	0.929	Proceed to play-in game
5	JRU Heavy Bombers	13	1	12	2	6	38	0.158	589	745	0.791	Proceed to play-in game

Source: GMA News
Rules for classification: 1) Number of wins; 2) match points; 3) sets ratio; 4) points ratio; 5) head-to-head record

===== Group B =====
Pos	Team	Pld	W	L	Pts	SW	SL	SR	SPW	SPL	SPR	Qualification
1	Arellano Chiefs	13	9	4	27	31	17	1.824	960	884	1.086	Twice-to-beat in the quarterfinals
2	San Beda Red Spikers	13	8	5	25	29	19	1.526	687	666	1.032	Twice-to-beat in the quarterfinals
3	EAC Generals	13	8	5	23	28	22	1.273	846	826	1.024	Twice-to-win in the quarterfinals
4	Letran Knights (H)	13	6	7	19	24	21	1.143	763	738	1.034	Proceed to play-in game
5	Lyceum Pirates	13	2	11	6	12	35	0.343	711	843	0.843	Proceed to play-in game

Source: GMA Integrated News
Rules for classification: 1) Number of wins; 2) match points; 3) sets ratio; 4) points ratio; 5) head-to-head record
(H) Host

==== Playoffs ====
Play-in games (Single-elimination)
B4	Letran	3
B5	Lyceum	0
A4	San Sebastian	3
A5	JRU	1

Quarterfinals (Top 2 twice-to-beat)
A1	Perpetual	1	1
B4	Letran	3	3
A2	Benilde	3
B3	EAC	2
B1	Arellano	3
A4	San Sebastian	1
B2	San Beda	1	1
A3	Mapúa	3	3

Semifinals (Best-of-three playoff)
B4	Letran	2	2
A2	Benilde	3	3
B1	Arellano	2	3	0
A3	Mapúa	3	1	3

Finals (Best-of-three playoff)
A2	Benilde	1	3	3
A3	Mapúa	3	2	0
Third place playoff
B4	Letran	3
B1	Arellano	2

==== Awards ====
NCAA Season 101 men's volleyball champions
Benilde Blazers
Second title

- Most Valuable Player: Axel Van Book (San Beda Red Spikers)
- Rookie of the Year: Marc Lemuel Tangon (Perpetual Altas Spikers)

=== Women's tournament ===
==== Group stage ====
===== Group A =====
Pos	Team	Pld	W	L	Pts	SW	SL	SR	SPW	SPL	SPR	Qualification
1	Perpetual Lady Altas	13	11	2	30	33	14	2.357	771	689	1.119	Twice-to-beat in the quarterfinals
2	Benilde Lady Blazers	13	10	3	31	36	14	2.571	790	652	1.212	Twice-to-beat in the quarterfinals
3	Mapúa Lady Cardinals	13	5	8	16	24	31	0.774	931	956	0.974	Twice-to-win in the quarterfinals
4	San Sebastian Lady Stags	13	5	8	15	19	29	0.655	742	794	0.935	Proceed to play-in game
5	JRU Lady Bombers	13	2	11	7	16	37	0.432	772	913	0.846	Proceed to play-in game

Source: GMA Integrated News
Rules for classification: 1) Number of wins; 2) match points; 3) sets ratio; 4) points ratio; 5) head-to-head record

===== Group B =====
Pos	Team	Pld	W	L	Pts	SW	SL	SR	SPW	SPL	SPR	Qualification
1	Letran Lady Knights (H)	13	13	0	36	39	8	4.875	872	700	1.246	Twice-to-beat in the quarterfinals
2	San Beda Lady Red Spikers	13	9	4	27	32	18	1.778	659	608	1.084	Twice-to-beat in the quarterfinals
3	Arellano Lady Chiefs	13	6	7	19	25	25	1.000	929	925	1.004	Twice-to-win in the quarterfinals
4	Lyceum Lady Pirates	13	4	9	11	15	32	0.469	720	837	0.860	Proceed to play-in game
5	EAC Lady Generals	13	0	13	3	8	39	0.205	730	853	0.856	Proceed to play-in game

Source: GMA Integrated News
Rules for classification: 1) Number of wins; 2) match points; 3) sets ratio; 4) points ratio; 5) head-to-head record
(H) Host

==== Playoffs ====
Play-in games (Single-elimination)
B4	Lyceum	0
B5	EAC	3
A4	San Sebastian	3
A5	JRU	1

Quarterfinals (Top 2 twice-to-beat)
A1	Perpetual	1	3
B5	EAC	3	0
A2	Benilde	3
B3	Arellano	1
B1	Letran	3
A4	San Sebastian	1
B2	San Beda	0	3
A3	Mapúa	3	2

Semifinals (Best-of-three playoff)
A1	Perpetual	2	0
A2	Benilde	3	3
B1	Letran	3	1	3
B2	San Beda	1	3	1

Finals (Best-of-three playoff)
A2	Benilde	2	3	2
B1	Letran	3	0	3
Third place playoff
A1	Perpetual	3
B2	San Beda	0

==== Awards ====
NCAA Season 101 women's volleyball champions
Letran Lady Knights
Ninth title

- Most Valuable Player: Zamantha Nolasco (Benilde Lady Blazers)
- Rookie of the Year: Camilla Amor Bartolome (Benilde Lady Blazers)

=== Boys' tournament ===
==== Group stage ====
===== Group A =====
Pos	Team	Pld	W	L	Pts	SW	SL	SR	SPW	SPL	SPR	Qualification
1	Malayan Junior Spikers	13	11	2	33	36	11	3.273	309	307	1.007	Twice-to-beat in the quarterfinals
2	Perpetual Junior Altas	13	11	2	32	35	13	2.692	350	294	1.190	Twice-to-beat in the quarterfinals
3	EAC–ICA Brigadiers	13	6	7	17	23	29	0.793	360	348	1.034	Twice-to-win in the quarterfinals
4	San Sebastian Staglets	12	4	8	13	20	29	0.690	363	394	0.921	Proceed to play-in game
5	San Beda Junior Red Spikers	12	2	10	8	11	31	0.355	323	364	0.887	Proceed to play-in game

Source: GMA Integrated News
Rules for classification: 1) Number of wins; 2) match points; 3) sets ratio; 4) points ratio; 5) head-to-head record

===== Group B =====
Pos	Team	Pld	W	L	Pts	SW	SL	SR	SPW	SPL	SPR	Qualification
1	Letran Squires	13	11	2	32	35	9	3.889	321	256	1.254	Twice-to-beat in the quarterfinals
2	Arellano Braves (H)	12	9	3	27	31	11	2.818	233	208	1.120	Twice-to-beat in the quarterfinals
3	JRU Light Bombers	12	5	7	17	19	23	0.826	316	328	0.963	Twice-to-win in the quarterfinals
4	Lyceum Junior Pirates	13	2	11	6	10	33	0.303	259	309	0.838	Proceed to play-in game
5	La Salle Green Hills Greenies	13	2	11	4	6	37	0.162	296	294	1.007	Proceed to play-in game

Source: GMA Integrated News
Rules for classification: 1) Number of wins; 2) match points; 3) sets ratio; 4) points ratio; 5) head-to-head record
(H) Host

==== Playoffs ====
Play-in games (Single-elimination)
B4	Lyceum–Cavite	3
B5	LSGH	2
A4	San Sebastian	3
A5	San Beda–Rizal	2

Quarterfinals (Top 2 twice-to-beat)
A1	Malayan	3
B4	Lyceum–Cavite	0
A2	Perpetual	3
B3	JRU	1
B1	Letran	3
A4	San Sebastian	0
B2	Arellano	3
A3	EAC–ICA	0

Semifinals (Best-of-three playoff)
A1	Malayan	3	3
A2	Perpetual	1	0
B1	Letran	3	3
B2	Arellano	0	2

Finals (Best-of-three playoff)
A1	Malayan	3	3
B1	Letran	1	1
Third place playoff
A2	Perpetual	0
B2	Arellano	3

==== Awards ====
NCAA Season 101 boys' volleyball champions
Mapúa Red Robins
Second title

- Most Valuable Player:
- Rookie of the Year:

=== Girls' tournament ===
==== Elimination round ====
Pos	Team	Pld	W	L	Pts	SW	SL	SR	SPW	SPL	SPR	Qualification
1	Perpetual Junior Lady Altas	6	6	0	16	12	2	6.000	100	51	1.961	Twice-to-beat in the semifinals
2	Arellano Lady Braves (H)	6	5	1	15	10	2	5.000	75	32	2.344	Twice-to-beat in the semifinals
3	EAC–ICA Lady Brigadiers	6	4	2	12	9	5	1.800	100	70	1.429	Twice-to-win in the semifinals
4	Lyceum Junior Lady Pirates	6	3	3	10	8	6	1.333	55	71	0.775	Twice-to-win in the semifinals
5	San Beda Baby Red Spikers	6	2	4	5	4	9	0.444	50	100	0.500	
6	La Salle Lady Greenies	6	1	5	4	3	8	0.375	49	100	0.490	
7	JRU Light Lady Bombers	6	0	6	0	0	12	0.000	47	75	0.627	

Source: GMA Integrated News
Rules for classification: 1) Number of wins; 2) match points; 3) sets ratio; 4) points ratio; 5) head-to-head record
(H) Host

==== Playoffs ====
Semifinals (Top 2 twice-to-beat)
1	Perpetual	3
4	Lyceum–Cavite	0
2	Arellano	3
3	EAC–ICA	0

Finals (Best-of-three series)
1	Perpetual	3	3
2	Arellano	0	0
Third place playoff
4	Lyceum–Cavite	2
3	EAC–ICA	3

==== Awards ====
NCAA Season 101 girls' volleyball champions
Perpetual Junior Lady Altas
Second title

- Most Valuable Player:
- Rookie of the Year:

== Football ==
The NCAA football championships began on March 9, 2026, and all matches hold at the Rizal Memorial Stadium.

=== Men's tournament ===
==== Elimination round ====
Pos	Team	Pld	W	D	L	GF	GA	GD	Pts	Qualification
1	Benilde Blazing Strikers	4	3	1	0	6	0	+6	10	Twice-to-beat in semifinals
2	San Beda Red Booters	4	3	0	1	12	1	+11	9	Twice-to-beat in semifinals
3	EAC Generals	4	1	2	1	4	4	0	5	Twice-to-win in semifinals
4	Perpetual Altas Booters (H)	4	1	1	2	6	7	−1	4	Twice-to-win in semifinals
5	Mapúa Cardinals	4	0	0	4	1	17	−16	0	

Source: NCAAPH
(H) Hosts

==== Match-up results ====
Team ╲ Game	1	2	3	4
Benilde	Mapua school colors	UPHD school colors	EAC school colors	San Beda school colors
EAC	UPHD school colors	San Beda school colors	CSB school colors	Mapua school colors
Mapúa	CSB school colors	UPHD school colors	San Beda school colors	EAC school colors
San Beda	EAC school colors	Mapua school colors	UPHD school colors	CSB school colors
Perpetual	EAC school colors	Mapua school colors	CSB school colors	San Beda school colors

Updated to match(es) played on March 16, 2026. Source: NCAAPH
= Win; = Draw; = Loss

==== Results ====
School	CSB	EAC	MU	SBU	UPHSD
Benilde Blazing Strikers		0–0	4–0	1–0	1–0
EAC Generals			3–1	0–2	1–1
Mapúa Cardinals				0–5	0–5
San Beda Red Booters					5–0
Perpetual Altas Booters					

Updated to match(es) played on March 16, 2026. Source: NCAAPH
Legend: Blue = left column team win; Yellow = draw; Red = top row team win.

==== Bracket ====
Semifinals
March 25
1	Benilde	5
4	Perpetual	0
March 25
2	San Beda	5
3	EAC	0

Finals
March 30
1	Benilde	0 (2)
2	San Beda (p)	0 (3)
Third place playoff
March 30
4	Perpetual	0 (7)
3	EAC (p)	0 (8)

==== Finals ====
March 30, 2026
6:00pm

Benilde Blazing Strikers	0–0 (a.e.t.)	San Beda Red Booters
Penalties
	2–3

Rizal Memorial Stadium, Manila
Referee: Mick John Pineda

=== Awards ===
NCAA Season 101 football champions
San Beda Red Lions
27th title, fourth consecutive title

== Cheerleading ==
The NCAA Cheerleading Competition was held on March 12, 2026 at the SM Mall of Asia Arena.

=== Team standings ===
Rank	Team	Order	Tumbling	Stunts	Tosses	Pyramids	Dance	Penalties	Points	Percentage
1st place, gold medalist(s)	AU Chiefsquad	7th						1	231	0%
2nd place, silver medalist(s)	Altas Perpsquad	5th						0	221	0%
3rd place, bronze medalist(s)	Letran Cheering Squad	8th						0	199.5	0%
4	EAC Generals Pep Squad	4th						0	185.5	0%
5	JRU Pep Squad	9th						0	162	0%
6	San Beda Red Army	6th						15	155.5	0%
7	Benilde Blazers Pep Squad	10th						0	151.5	0%
8	Golden Stags Cheerleading Squad	2nd						0	146.5	0%
9	LPU Pirates Pep Squad	1st						0	139	0%
10	Mapúa Cheerping Cardinals	3rd						45	129.2	0%

=== Awards ===
NCAA Season 101 cheerleading champions
Arellano Chiefs
Eighth title, seventh consecutive title

== Esports ==
=== Preliminary round ===
==== Team standings ====
Group A
Pos	Team	GW	W	L	Pts
1	Mapúa Cardinals	29	14	2	41
2	Lyceum Pirates	27	13	3	36
3	EAC Generals	19	8	8	22
4	Benilde Blazers	16	7	9	18
5	OLFU Phoenix (G)	13	4	12	14
6	San Beda Red Lions	5	1	15	6

Group B
Pos	Team	GW	W	L	Pts
1	JRU Heavy Bombers	31	15	1	43
2	Letran CyberKnights	28	13	3	37
3	Perpetual Altas	20	9	7	28
4	CEU Scorpions (G)	16	5	11	19
5	Arellano Chiefs	14	6	9	17
6	San Sebastian Stags	7	1	15	7

Twice-to-beat advantage in the final round
Twice-to-win advantage in the final round
Proceed to the play-in game
Eliminated

==== Match Results ====
Team	Game															
Team	1	2	3	4	5	6	7	8	9	10	11	12	13	14	15	16
Arellano (AU)	CEU; 0–2	SSC-R; 2–0	CSJL; 0–2	JRU; 0–2	UPHSD; 2–0	CEU; 2–1	SSC-R; 2–1	CSJL; 2–1	JRU; 0–2	UPHSD; 0–2	SBU; 2–0	OLFU; 1–2	MU; 0–2	CSB; 1–2	LPU; 0–2	EAC; 0–2
CEU (G)	AU; 2–0	JRU; 1–2	SSC-R; 2–1	UPHSD; 1–2	CSJL; 0–2	AU; 1–2	JRU; 0–2	SSC-R; 2–1	UPHSD; 0–2	CSJL; 1–2	OLFU; 2–0	MU; 1–2	EAC; 0–2	LPU; 0–2	CSB; 1–2	SBU; 2–0
Letran (CSJL)	JRU; 1–2	UPHSD; 2–1	AU; 2–0	SSC-R; 2–0	CEU; 2–0	JRU; 2–1	UPHSD; 2–0	AU; 1–2	SSC-R; 2–0	CEU; 2–1	LPU; 2–0	CSB; 2–0	SBU; 2–0	MU; 0–2	EAC; 2–1	OLFU; 2–0
Benilde (CSB)	MU; 0–2	SBU; 2–0	OLFU; 2–1	LPU; 0–2	EAC; 2–1	MU; 0–2	SBU; 2–0	OLFU; 1–2	LPU; 0–2	EAC; 1–2	SSC-R; 2–1	CSJL; 0–2	JRU; 0–2	AU; 2–1	CEU; 2–1	UPHSD; 0–2
EAC	LPU; 1–2	OLFU; 2–1	MU; 0–2	SBU; 2–1	CSB; 1–2	LPU; 0–2	OLFU; 2–0	MU; 0–2	SBU; 2–1	CSB; 2–1	JRU; 0–2	UPHSD; 0–2	CEU; 2–0	SSC-R; 2–0	CSJL; 1–2	AU; 2–0
JRU	CSJL; 2–1	CEU; 2–1	UPHSD; 2–0	AU; 2–0	SSC-R; 2–0	CSJL; 1–2	CEU; 2–0	UPHSD; 2–0	AU; 2–0	SSC-R; 2–0	EAC; 2–0	LPU; 2–1	CSB; 2–0	SBU; 2–0	OLFU; 2–0	MU; 2–0
Lyceum (LPU)	EAC; 2–1	MU; 0–2	SBU; 2–0	CSB; 2–0	OLFU; 2–0	EAC; 2–0	MU; 2–1	SBU; 2–0	CSB; 2–0	OLFU; 2–1	CSJL; 0–2	JRU; 1–2	UPHSD; 2–1	CEU; 2–0	AU; 2–0	SSC-R; 2–1
Mapúa (MU)	CSB; 2–0	LPU; 2–0	EAC; 2–0	OLFU; 2–1	SBU; 2–0	CSB; 2–0	LPU; 1–2	EAC; 2–0	OLFU; 2–0	SBU; 2–0	UPHSD; 2–0	CEU; 2–1	AU; 2–0	CSJL; 2–0	SSC-R; 2–0	JRU; 0–2
OLFU (G)	SBU; 2–0	EAC; 1–2	CSB; 1–2	MU; 1–2	LPU; 0–2	SBU; 2–1	EAC; 0–2	CSB; 2–1	MU; 0–2	LPU; 1–2	CEU; 0–2	AU; 2–1	SSC-R; 1–2	UPHSD; 0–2	JRU; 0–2	CSJL; 0–2
San Beda (SBU)	OLFU; 0–2	CSB; 0–2	LPU; 0–2	EAC; 0–2	MU; 0–2	OLFU; 1–2	CSB; 0–2	LPU; 0–2	EAC; 1–2	MU; 0–2	AU; 0–2	SSC-R; 2–0	CSJL; 0–2	JRU; 0–2	UPHSD; 0–2	CEU; 0–2
San Sebastian (SSC-R)	UPHSD; 0–2	AU; 0–2	CEU; 1–2	CSJL; 0–2	JRU; 0–2	UPHSD; 0–2	AU; 1–2	CEU; 1–2	CSJL; 0–2	JRU; 0–2	CSB; 1–2	SBU; 0–2	OLFU; 2–1	EAC; 0–2	MU; 0–2	LPU; 1–2
Perpetual (UPHSD)	SSC-R; 2–0	CSJL; 1–2	JRU; 0–2	CEU; 2–1	AU; 0–2	SSC-R; 2–0	CSJL; 0–2	JRU; 0–2	CEU; 2–0	AU; 2–0	MU; 0–2	EAC; 2–0	LPU; 1–2	OLFU; 2–0	SBU; 2–0	CSB; 2–0

Legend: Blue = win; Red = loss

=== Final round ===
==== Bracket ====
Play-in games (Single-elimination)
B4	CEU	0
A5	OLFU	2
A4	Benilde	0
B5	Arellano	2

Quarterfinals (Top 2 twice-to-beat)
A1	Mapúa	2
A5	OLFU	0
A2	Lyceum	2
B3	Perpetual	0
B1	JRU	2
B5	Arellano	0
B2	Letran	1
A3	EAC	2

Semifinals (Best-of-three playoff)
A1	Mapúa	1
A2	Lyceum	2
B1	JRU	2
A3	EAC	0

Finals (Best-of-five playoff)
A2	Lyceum	3
B1	JRU	1

==== Awards ====
NCAA Season 101 esports champions
Lyceum Pirates
First title

6-man Roster:
Mallorca, Mendoza, Santos, Alibangbang, Furaque, Castor

- Most Valuable Player: Symon Mallorca

==== Final Standing ====
Rank	Team
1st place, gold medalist(s)	Lyceum Pirates
2nd place, silver medalist(s)	JRU Heavy Bombers
3rd place, bronze medalist(s)	Mapúa Cardinals
4	EAC Generals
5	Letran Knights
6	Perpetual Altas
7	Benilde Blazers
8	CEU Scorpions
9	Arellano Chiefs
10	OLFU Phoenix
11	San Sebastian Stags
12	San Beda Red Lions

== Media coverage ==
This was the sixth and final season of the NCAA's broadcast partnership with GMA Network under their deal. Their contract expired on May 31, 2026.

== General championship summary ==
=== Medal tables ===
==== Seniors' division ====
Rank	Team	Gold	Silver	Bronze	Total
1	De La Salle–College of Saint Benilde	9	8	1	18
2	San Beda University	8	3	2	13
3	University of Perpetual Help System DALTA	1	3	7	11
4	Mapúa University*	1	2	3	6
5	José Rizal University	1	2	0	3
6	Colegio de San Juan de Letran	1	1	2	4
7	Lyceum of the Philippines University	1	1	1	3
8	San Sebastian College–Recoletos	0	2	3	5
9	Emilio Aguinaldo College	0	0	4	4
10	Arellano University	0	0	0	0
Totals (10 entries)		22	22	23	67

* Host nation (Season host); Leads the general championship tally
Notes: Season in progress. Results are not yet final.

==== Juniors' division ====
Rank	Team	Gold	Silver	Bronze	Total
1	San Beda University–Rizal	3	3	2	8
2	University of Perpetual Help System DALTA	2	1	2	5
3	Colegio de San Juan de Letran	2	0	1	3
4	José Rizal University	2	0	0	2
5	Malayan High School of Science*	1	1	2	4
6	San Sebastian College–Recoletos	1	1	0	2
7	EAC–Immaculate Conception Academy	1	0	2	3
8	La Salle Green Hills	1	0	1	2
9	Arellano University	0	6	2	8
10	Lyceum of the Philippines University–Cavite	0	1	0	1
Totals (10 entries)		13	13	12	38

* Host nation (Season host); Leads the general championship tally
Notes: Season in progress. Results are not yet final.

=== General championship tally ===
==== Seniors' division ====
		Basketball	3x3 basketball	Volleyball (indoor)		Volleyball (beach)		Swimming		Chess	Tennis		Soft tennis		Table tennis		Badminton		Taekwondo		Football	Athletics	Electronic sports	Total		
Rank	Team	M	M	M	W	M	W	M	W	M	M	W	M	W	M	W	M	W	M	W	M	M	M	M	W	Overall
1	Benilde	30	—	50	40	40	40	40	40	50	50	50	40	50	50	50	50	—	50	40	40	35	—	525	310	835
2	San Beda	50	30	—	—	50	50	50	50	—	—	—	35	30	35	40	40	50	40	50	50	—	—	380	270	650
3	Perpetual	35	40	—	35	—	30	35	35	35	40	35	50	40	—	35	—	—	—	—	30	—	—	265	210	475
4	Mapúa (H)	—	—	40	—	—	—	20	20	—	—	—	—	—	40	35	—	35	—	—	25	50	35	210	90	300
5	San Sebastian	—	—	—	—	—	—	30	15	—	35	40	—	35	—	—	35	40	—	—	—	—	—	100	130	230
6	EAC	—	—	—	—	—	35	15	30	—	—	—	30	—	—	—	—	—	35	35	35	—	—	115	100	215
7	Letran	40	—	35	50	35	—	25	25	—	—	—	—	—	—	—	—	—	—	—	—	—	—	135	75	210
8	Lyceum	—	35	—	—	—	—	8	10	40	—	—	—	—	—	—	—	—	—	—	—	—	50	133	10	143
9	JRU	—	50	—	—	—	—	6	—	—	—	—	—	—	—	—	—	—	—	—	—	40	40	136	0	136
10	Arellano	—	—	—	—	30	—	10	8	—	—	—	—	—	—	—	—	—	—	—	—	—	—	40	8	48

(H) Season host; = Champion; = Runner-up; = Third place; — = No team.
Notes: Season in progress. Results are not yet final.

==== Juniors' division ====
		Basketball		3x3 basketball	Volleyball (indoor)	Volleyball (beach)	Swimming	Chess	Tennis	Soft tennis	Table tennis	Badminton	Taekwondo	Athletics	Total		
Rank	Team	B	K	B	G	B	B	B	B	B	B	B	B	B	B	G	Overall
1	SBU–R	—	—	35	25	—	40	50	—	40	50	35	50	40	340	25	365
2	Arellano	40	40	40	40	35	—	35	—	—	—	40	40	—	230	40	310
3	Perpetual	—	—	—	50	—	—	—	35	50	40	—	—	35	160	50	210
4	Malayan (H)	35	—	—	—	40	—	—	50	35	—	—	—	—	160	0	160
5	EAC–ICA	30	50	—	35	—	—	—	—	—	—	—	35	—	65	35	150
6	JRU	—	—	50	15	30	—	—	—	—	—	—	—	50	130	15	145
7	LSGH	—	35	30	20	—	50	—	—	—	—	—	—	—	80	20	135
7	Letran	50	—	—	—	50	35	—	—	—	—	—	—	—	135	0	135
9	San Sebastian	—	—	—	—	—	—	—	40	—	—	50	—	—	90	0	90
10	LPU–C	—	—	—	30	—	—	40	—	—	—	—	—	—	40	30	70

(H) Season host; = Champion; = Runner-up; = Third place; — = No team.
Notes: Season in progress. Results are not yet final.

== See also ==
- UAAP Season 88
