= NCAA 3x3 basketball championships (Philippines) =

3x3 Basketball championship

NCAA 3x3 Basketball championship
- Sport: 3x3 Basketball
- Founded: 2019
- Country: Philippines
- Most recent champions: Seniors' division: José Rizal University; Juniors' division: José Rizal University
- Most titles: Seniors' division: José Rizal University (2 titles); Juniors' division: San Beda University–Rizal (2 titles)

The NCAA 3x3 Basketball championship was introduced in 2017–2018 season as a special event, with Letran and JRU winning the inaugural tournament for 14U and 18U. As a special event, the championship will not be included in the General Championship tally.

== Results ==
Denotes school won in 2 divisions in the same year

| Academic year | Seniors | Juniors | | Ref |
|---|---|---|---|---|
| Academic year | 24U | 15U | 18U | Ref |
| 2019–20 | Arellano University (1) | San Beda University–Rizal (1) | San Beda University–Rizal (1) | |
| Academic year | Seniors | Juniors | | Ref |
| 2023–24 | José Rizal University (1) | University of Perpetual Help System DALTA (1) | | |
| 2024–25 | José Rizal University (2) | EAC–Immaculate Conception Academy (1) | | |
| 2025–26 | José Rizal University (3) | José Rizal University (1) | | |

== Number of championships by school ==
| School | Juniors' | Men's | Total |
|---|---|---|---|
| José Rizal University | 1 | 3 | 4 |
| San Beda University | 2 | 0 | 2 |
| Arellano University | 0 | 1 | 1 |
| University of Perpetual Help System DALTA | 1 | 0 | 1 |

== See also ==
- UAAP 3x3 basketball championship
