= NCAA football championships (Philippines) =

Philippines college association football tournament

NCAA Philippines overall championship
- Sport: Football
- Founded: 1924
- Country: Philippines
- Most recent champions: Seniors' division: San Beda University; Juniors' division: San Beda University–Rizal
- Most titles: Seniors' division: San Beda University (27 titles); Juniors' division: La Salle Green Hills (43 titles)

The National Collegiate Athletic Association football championship is held every early part of the year.

The football season is divided into two conferences (tournaments). Out of the eight NCAA schools, so far four fielded a team in the football tournament.

The teams face each other once every conference. The teams with the most points on the league table advances in the Championship game.

If a team wins both conferences, the Championship game is omitted, and the winning team from both conferences is the champion.

== Champions ==
Denotes school won double crowns

Academic Year	Men	Juniors
1924–1925	Ateneo de Manila (1)	De La Salle College (1)
1925–1926	Saint Vincent de Paul (1)	San Beda College (1)
1926–1927	University of Santo Tomas (1)	De La Salle College (2)
1927–1928	University of Santo Tomas (2)	De La Salle College (3)
1928–1929	University of Santo Tomas (3)	De La Salle College (4)
1929–1930	University of Santo Tomas (4)	De La Salle College (5)
1930–1931	Not Held	Not Held
1931–1932	Not Held	Not Held
1932–1933	De La Salle College (1)	De La Salle College (6)
1933–1934	De La Salle College (2)	De La Salle College (7)
1934–1935	De La Salle College (3)	De La Salle College (8)
1935–1936	De La Salle College (4)	De La Salle College (9)
1936–1937	De La Salle College (5)	Ateneo de Manila (1)
1937–1938	De La Salle College (6)	De La Salle College (10)
1938–1939	De La Salle College (7)	De La Salle College (11)
1939–1940	De La Salle College (8)	De La Salle College (12)
1940–1941	De La Salle College (9)	De La Salle College (13)
1941–1942	Ateneo de Manila (2)	De La Salle College (14)
1942–1947	Not held due to World War II	
1947–1948	De La Salle College (10)	Colegio de San Juan de Letran (1)
1948–1949	Colegio de San Juan de Letran (1)	De La Salle College (15)
1949–1950	De La Salle College (11)	De La Salle College (16)
1950–1951	Not Held	
1951–1952	Ateneo de Manila (3); De La Salle College (12)	Ateneo de Manila (2)
1952–1953	De La Salle College (13)	Mapúa Institute of Technology (1)
1953–1954	Ateneo de Manila (4)	Mapúa Institute of Technology (2)
1954–1955	Ateneo de Manila (5)	Mapúa Institute of Technology (3)
1955–1956	Mapúa Institute of Technology (1)	De La Salle College (17)
1956–1957	Colegio de San Juan de Letran (2)	San Beda College (2)
1957–1958	Mapúa Institute of Technology (2)	De La Salle College (18)
1958–1959	Mapúa Institute of Technology (3)	Mapúa Institute of Technology (4)
1959–1960	Mapúa Institute of Technology (4)	Mapúa Institute of Technology (5)
1960–1961	Mapúa Institute of Technology (5)	De La Salle College (19)
1961–1962	Suspended	
1962–1965	Not Held	
1965–1966	De La Salle College (14)	Colegio de San Juan de Letran (2)
1966–1967	De La Salle College (15)	De La Salle College (20)
1967–1968	Ateneo de Manila University (6)	De La Salle College (21)
1968–1969	San Beda College (1)	La Salle Green Hills (1)
1969–1970	San Beda College (2)	La Salle Green Hills (2)
1970–1971	Mapúa Institute of Technology (6)	San Beda College (3)
1971–1972	De La Salle College (16)	La Salle Green Hills (3)
1972–1973	De La Salle College (17)	La Salle Green Hills (4)
1973–1974	Not Held	
1974–1975	De La Salle College (18)	La Salle Green Hills (5)
1975–1976	De La Salle University (19)	La Salle Green Hills (6)
1976–1977	De La Salle University (20)	La Salle Green Hills (7)
1977–1978	De La Salle University (21)	Ateneo de Manila University (3)
1978–1979	Suspended	
1979–1980	Mapúa Institute of Technology (7)	La Salle Green Hills (8)
1980–1981	Mapúa Institute of Technology (8)	La Salle Green Hills (9)
1981–1982	Mapúa Institute of Technology (9)	Mapúa Institute of Technology (6)
1982–1983	San Beda College (3)	San Beda College (4)
1983–1984	Colegio de San Juan de Letran (3)	Not Held
1984–1985	Mapúa Institute of Technology (10)	Not Held
1985–1986	Colegio de San Juan de Letran (4)	Not Held
1986–1987	Colegio de San Juan de Letran (5)	Not Held
1987–1988	Mapúa Institute of Technology (11)	Colegio de San Juan de Letran (3)
1988–1989	Colegio de San Juan de Letran (6)	Colegio de San Juan de Letran (4)
1989–1990	University of Perpetual Help System DALTA (1)	San Beda College (5)
1990–1991	Perpetual Help College of Rizal (4)	San Beda College (6)
1991–1992	Mapúa Institute of Technology (5)	San Beda College (7)
1992–1993	San Beda College (6)	San Beda College (8)
1993–1994	San Beda College (7)	San Beda College (9)
1994–1995	San Beda College (8)	San Beda College (10)
1995–1996	San Beda College (9)	San Beda College (11)
1996–1997	University of Perpetual Help Rizal (2)	San Beda College (12)
1997–1998	Colegio de San Juan de Letran (7)	San Beda College (13)
1998–1999	Philippine Christian University (1)	San Beda College (14)
1999–2000	Philippine Christian University (2)	Mapúa Institute of Technology (7)
2000–2001	Philippine Christian University (3)	La Salle Green Hills (10)
2001–2002	San Beda College (10)	Colegio de San Juan de Letran (5)
2002–2003	San Beda College (11)	La Salle Green Hills (11)
2003–2004	San Beda College (12)	La Salle Green Hills (12)
2004–2005	San Beda College (13)	La Salle Green Hills (13)
2005–2006	San Beda College (14)	La Salle Green Hills (14)
2006–2007	San Beda College (15)	La Salle Green Hills (15)
2007–2008	San Beda College (16)	La Salle Green Hills (16)
2008–2009	San Beda College (17)	La Salle Green Hills (17)
2009–2010	De La Salle–College of Saint Benilde (1)	La Salle Green Hills (18)
2010–2011	San Beda College (18)	La Salle Green Hills (19)
2011–2012	San Beda College (19)	La Salle Green Hills (20)
2012–2013	San Beda College (20)	San Beda College–Rizal (15)
2013–2014	San Beda College (21)	San Beda College–Rizal (16)
2014–2015	San Beda College (22)	La Salle Green Hills (21)
2015–2016	Arellano University (1)	La Salle Green Hills (22)
2016–2017	San Beda College (23)	San Beda College–Rizal (17)
2017–2018	De La Salle–College of Saint Benilde (2)	San Beda College–Rizal (18)
2018–2019	San Beda University (24)	Arellano University (1)
2019-2020	Not held due to COVID-19 pandemic	
2020-2021	Not held due to COVID-19 pandemic	
2021-2022	Not Held	Not Held
2022-2023	Not Held	Not Held
2023–2024	San Beda University (25)	Not Held
2024–2025	San Beda University (26)	San Beda University–Rizal (19)
2025–2026	San Beda University (27)	

== Number of championships by school ==
The school left the league

School	Seniors'	Juniors'	Total
De La Salle University – La Salle Greenhills (Note: LSGH won nine (9) titles as a junior to DLSU (1969–1981) and thirteen (13) titles as a junior to CSB (1998–present).)	21	30	51
San Beda University	27	19	46
Mapúa University (Note: The Mapúa High School was closed down in 2005. Since 2008, the Malayan High School of Science Red Robins represented Mapúa University in the juniors' division.)	12	7	19
De La Salle–College of Saint Benide – La Salle Green Hills	2	13	15
Colegio de San Juan de Letran	7	5	12
Ateneo de Manila University	6	3	9
University of Santo Tomas	4	0	4
Philippine Christian University	3	0	3
University of Perpetual Help System DALTA	2	0	2
Arellano University	1	1	2
Saint Vincent de Paul	1	0	1

== See also ==
- UAAP Football Championship
