= NCAA soft tennis championships (Philippines) =

Former demonstration sport

NCAA Soft Tennis championship
- Sport: Soft Tennis
- Founded: 2009
- Country: Philippines
- Most recent champions: Men's division: University of Perpetual Help System DALTA; Women's division: De La Salle–College of Saint Benilde; Juniors' division: University of Perpetual Help System DALTA
- Most titles: Men's division: San Beda University (6 titles); Women's division: San Beda University (6 titles)

The NCAA soft tennis championship is a former demonstration sport that was introduced in the 2009-10 season.

== Champions ==
Demonstration sport
There was no juniors' and seniors' team
Denotes school won double crown

Academic Year	Men	Women	Juniors
2009–10		San Beda College (1)	Not held
2010–11		University of Perpetual Help System DALTA (1)	Not held
2011–13	Not held		Not held
2013–14		De La Salle–College of Saint Benilde (1)	Not held
2013–14	San Beda College (1)		Not held
2014–15	San Beda College (2)		Not held
2015–16	San Beda College (3)	San Beda College (2)	Not held
2016–17	San Beda College (4)	San Beda College (3)	Not held
2017–18	San Beda University (5)	San Beda University (4)	Not held
2018–19	San Beda University (6)	San Beda University (5)	Not held
2019–23	Not held		Not held
2023–24	De La Salle–College of Saint Benilde (1)	University of Perpetual Help System DALTA (2)	Not held
2024–25	University of Perpetual Help System DALTA (1)	San Beda University (6)	Not held
2025–26	University of Perpetual Help System DALTA (2)	De La Salle–College of Saint Benilde (2)	University of Perpetual Help System DALTA (1)

== Number of championships by school ==
School	Men's	Women's	Total
San Beda University	6	6	10
University of Perpetual Help System DALTA	1	2	2
De La Salle–College of Saint Benilde	1	1	2
