= NCAA Cheerleading Competition =

Philippine cheerleading competition

- Sport: Cheerleading
- Founded: 2004
- No. of teams: 10
- Country: Philippines
- Most recent champion: Arellano University
- Most titles: University of Perpetual Help System DALTA (9)

The NCAA Cheerleading Competition previously known as NCAA Cheerdance Competition is an annual one-day event of the National Collegiate Athletic Association for cheerleading in the Philippines.

In the 87th season of the NCAA, cheerleading has been upgraded to a regular sport which means it will contribute points in the overall championship race.

== Participants ==
School	Cheerleading Team
Arellano University (AU)	AU Chiefsquad (AU Dancing Chiefs: 2009–2012)
Colegio de San Juan de Letran (CSJL)	Letran Cheering Squad (Letran Cheerleading Team All Stars: 2010–2013) (Lakas Arriba Cheerleading Team: 2013–2022)
De La Salle–College of Saint Benilde (CSB)	CSB Pep Squad (CSB Green Peppers: 2005–2011) (De La Salle - College of Saint Benilde Pep Squad: 2012–Present)
Emilio Aguinaldo College (EAC)	EAC Generals Pep Squad
José Rizal University (JRU)	JRU Pep Squad (JRU Pep Squad: until 2012, 2015–present) (JRU Cheer Explosives: 2012–2015)
Lyceum of the Philippines University (LPU)	LPU Pirates Pep Squad
Mapúa University (MU)	Mapua Cheerping Cardinals
San Beda University (SBU)	San Beda Red Army (San Beda Cheerleaders Association: until 2010) (San Beda Red Corps: 2010-2026)
San Sebastian College–Recoletos (SSC-R)	Golden Stags Cheerleading Squad
University of Perpetual Help System DALTA (UPHSD)	Altas Perpsquad

=== Past participants ===
School	Cheerleading Team
Angeles University Foundation (AUF)	AUF Great Danes Pep Squad
Philippine Christian University (PCU)	PCU Pep Squad

== Results ==
Year	Season host	Venue	Champion	2nd place	3rd place	4th place	5th place	6th place	7th place	8th place	9th place	10th place	Ref.
September 15, 2004	Perpetual	Araneta Colliseum	Mapúa	Letran	San Sebastian	Perpetual	San Beda	PCU	JRU	Benilde			
August 10, 2005	Letran	Araneta Colliseum	Perpetual	San Sebastian	Letran	PCU	San Beda	JRU	Mapúa	Benilde			
September 8, 2006	Benilde	Araneta Colliseum	Perpetual	Letran	Mapúa	PCU	JRU	San Sebastian	San Beda				
September 12, 2007	JRU	Araneta Colliseum	Perpetual; 209.50	Mapúa; 208.00	Letran; 201.00	San Sebastian; 175.50	JRU; 136.00	Benilde; 126.00	San Beda; 122.00				
October 22, 2008	Mapúa	Araneta Colliseum	JRU; 198.80	Mapúa; 190.10	Benilde; 188.30	Letran; 176.40	Perpetual; 172.80	San Sebastian; 162.80	San Beda; 160.00	PCU; 159.90			
October 21, 2009	San Beda	Filoil Flying V Arena	Perpetual; 335.50	JRU; 311.00	EAC; 244.00	San Sebastian; 243.00	Mapúa; 236.50	AUF; 214.00	Benilde; 194.50	Arellano; 169.00	Letran; 168.50	San Beda; 148.00	
September 29, 2010	San Sebastian	Filoil Flying V Arena	Perpetual; 300.00	Mapúa; 290.50	JRU; 289.50	San Sebastian; 275.00	EAC; 268.00	Letran; 267.00	Arellano; 246.50	Benilde; 239.50	San Beda; 166.50		
March 10, 2012	Perpetual	Filoil Flying V Arena	Perpetual; 335.00	Mapúa; 304.00	Letran; 256.00	Arellano; 255.50	JRU; 251.00	Lyceum; 234.50	Benilde; 227.50	EAC; 221.50	San Beda; 180.50	San Sebastian; 178.00	
March 9, 2013	Letran	Mall of Asia Arena	Perpetual; 598.50	Arellano; 554.50	EAC; 498.00	Letran; 487.00	Lyceum; 484.50	Mapúa; 474.50	Benilde; 450.00	JRU; 427.50	San Beda; 421.00	San Sebastian; 342.00	
March 8, 2014	Benilde	Mall of Asia Arena	Perpetual; 480.50	Arellano; 468.00	Mapúa; 450.50	Lyceum; 440.50	JRU; 426.00	EAC; 420.50	Benilde; 415.50	Letran; 384.50	San Beda; 329.50	San Sebastian; 278.00	
March 10, 2015	JRU	Mall of Asia Arena	Arellano; 405.50	Perpetual; 404.50	Benilde; 359.50	JRU; 353.00	EAC; 344.50	Letran; 332.00	Lyceum; 322.00	Mapúa; 301.00	San Beda; 291.00		
March 8, 2016	Mapúa	Mall of Asia Arena	Perpetual; 195.00	Arellano; 193.00	EAC; 145.00	JRU; 131.50	San Beda; 126.00	Lyceum; 123.50	Benilde; 121.00	Mapúa; 120.50	Letran; 99.50		
March 9, 2017	San Beda	Mall of Asia Arena	Arellano; 218.00	Perpetual; 199.50	Mapúa; 191.00	San Beda; 175.00	EAC; 164.50	Benilde; 156.50	Lyceum; 143.00	JRU; 141.00			
March 15, 2018	San Sebastian	Smart Araneta Colliseum	Arellano; 234.50	Perpetual; 226.00	San Beda; 193.50	Mapúa; 193.00	JRU; 190.00	EAC; 175.50	Letran; 170.50	Benilde; 166.00	Lyceum; 152.00		
March 28, 2019	Perpetual	Mall of Asia Arena	Arellano; 229.50	Perpetual; 222.50	Mapúa; 211.50	Letran; 207.00	Benilde; 203.00	San Beda; 189.00	JRU; 178.50	EAC; 170.50			
2019–20^{a}	Arellano	The competition was suspended for a year.											
2020–21^{a}	Letran	The competition was suspended for a year.											
2021–22^{a}	Benilde	The competition was suspended for a year.											
April 30, 2023^{b}	EAC	Rizal Memorial Sports Complex	Arellano; 245.50	Perpetual; 227.50	Letran; 215.50	Mapúa; 210.50	San Beda; 204.00	EAC; 196.50	Benilde; 183.50	Lyceum; 155.50	San Sebastian; 155.50	JRU; 138.50	
June 19, 2024^{c}	JRU	Filoil EcoOil Centre	Arellano; 253.50	Perpetual; 231.50	Letran; 206.00	Mapúa; 184.00	San Beda; 181.00	Benilde; 181.00	EAC; 178.00	San Sebastian; 160.50	JRU; 160.00	Lyceum; 148.50	
June 18, 2025^{d}	Lyceum	Mall of Asia Arena	Arellano; 218.00	Perpetual; 213.50	Letran; 210.50	Mapúa; 193.50	San Beda; 190.50	Benilde; 184.00	EAC; 170.00	JRU; 162.50	San Sebastian; 144.50		
March 12, 2026	Mapúa	Mall of Asia Arena	Arellano; 231.00	Perpetual; 221.00	Letran; 199.50	EAC; 185.50	JRU; 162.00	San Beda; 155.50	Benilde; 151.50	San Sebastian; 146.50	Lyceum; 139.00	Mapúa; 129.20	
2026–27	San Beda		—	—	—								

Notes:

- ^a - In the 2nd quarter of 2020 the remainder of the NCAA Season 95 was scrapped due to the COVID-19 pandemic in the Philippines. No championships involving contact sports were held for the 96th season. The cheerleading competition was scrapped for the 97th season.
- ^b - The Lyceum of the Philippines University and the San Sebastian College–Recoletos finished the competition tied in the eighth place.
- ^c - The San Beda University and the De La Salle–College of Saint Benilde finished the competition tied in the fifth place.
- ^d - Due to multiple players suffering injuries, the Lyceum of the Philippines University were unable to compete. However, they still performed at the end of the competition as an exhibition performance.

== Number of championships by school ==
Denotes school left the league.

Perpetual leads the league with a record nine titles, making history as the first team to achieve a five-peat.

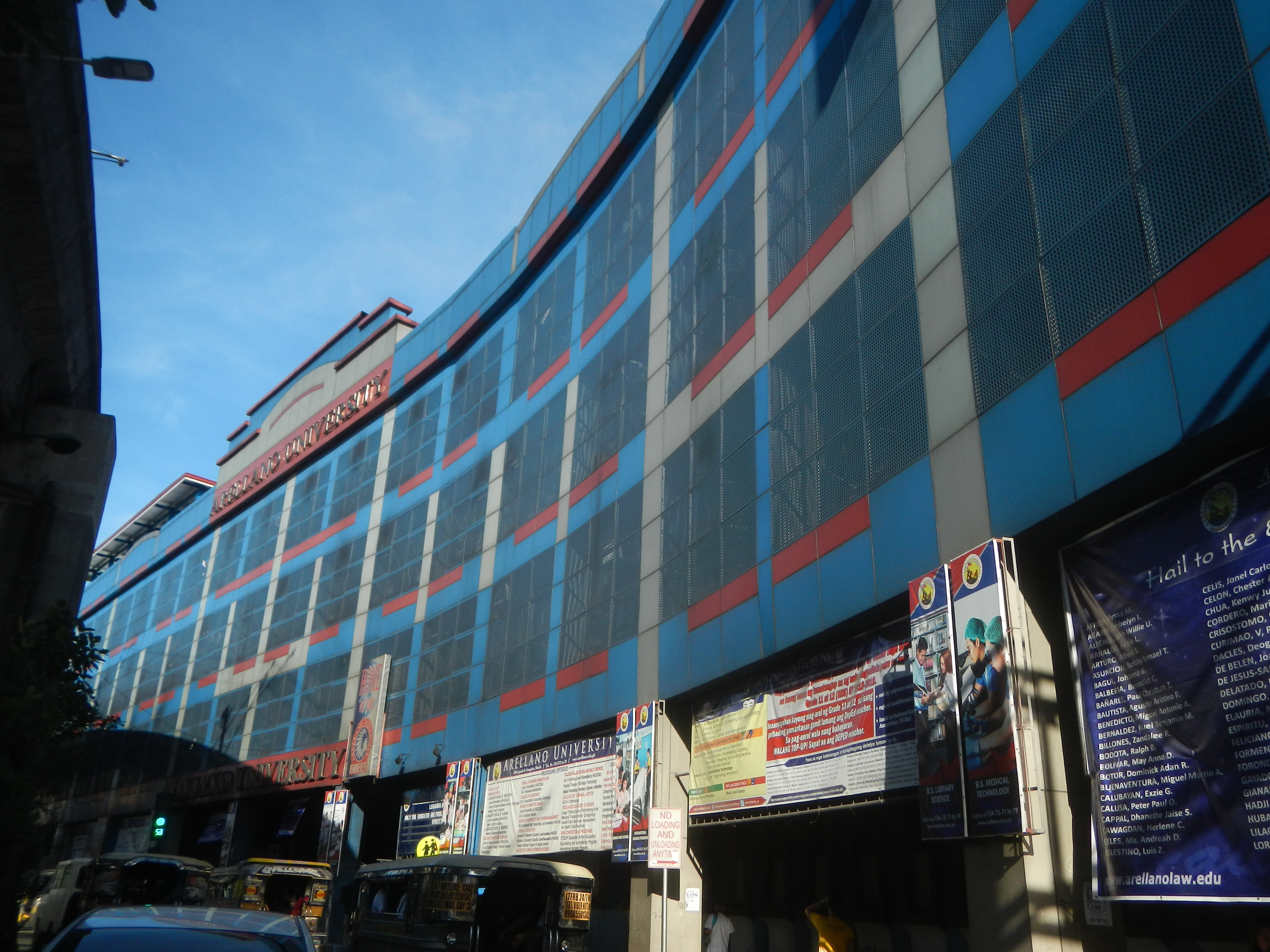
Arellano became the first team in league history to achieve a seven-peat in cheerleading, maintaining their reign as defending champions with consecutive titles from 2017 to 2026.

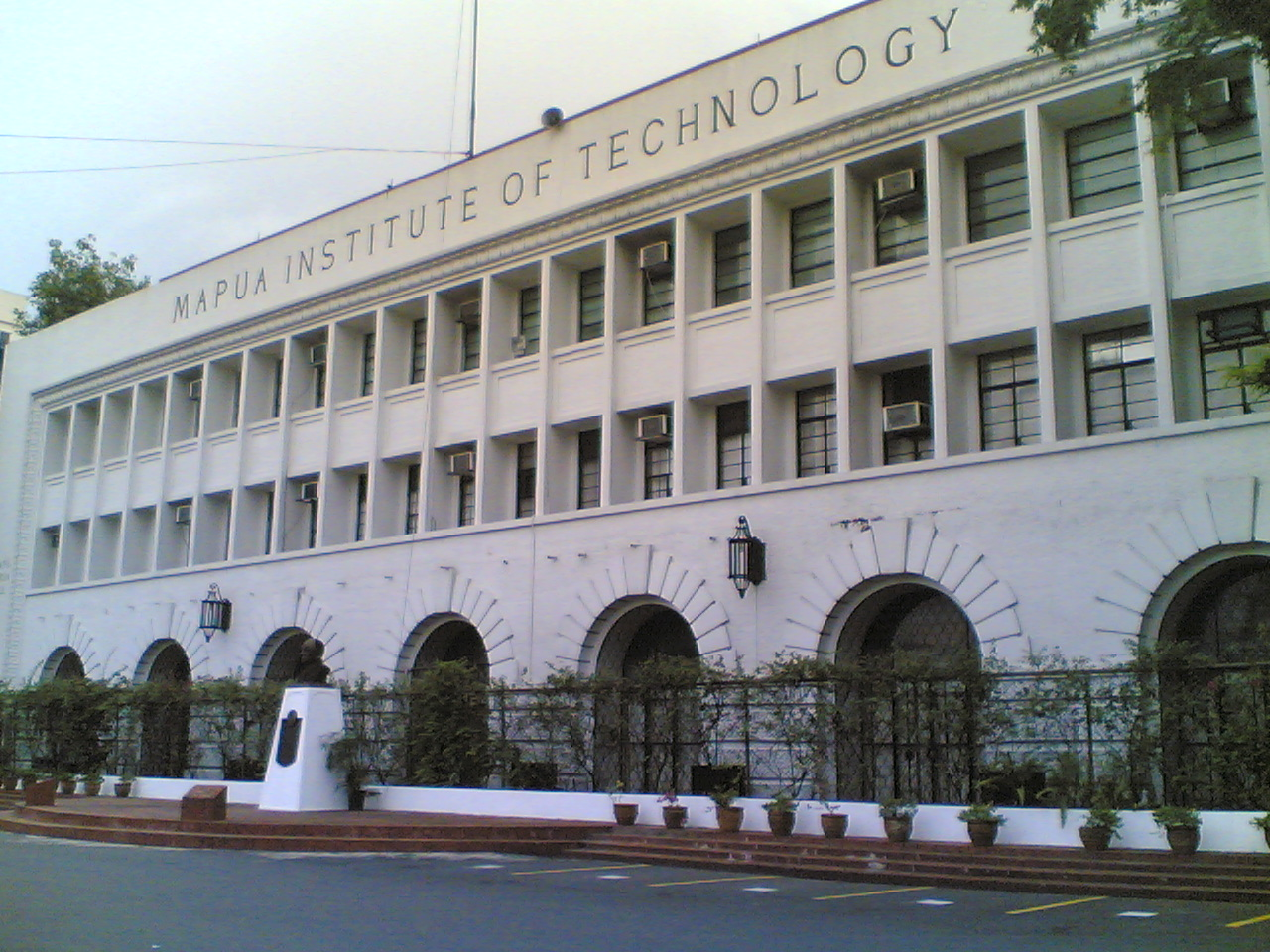
Mapúa won the inaugural cheerleading competition in 2004.

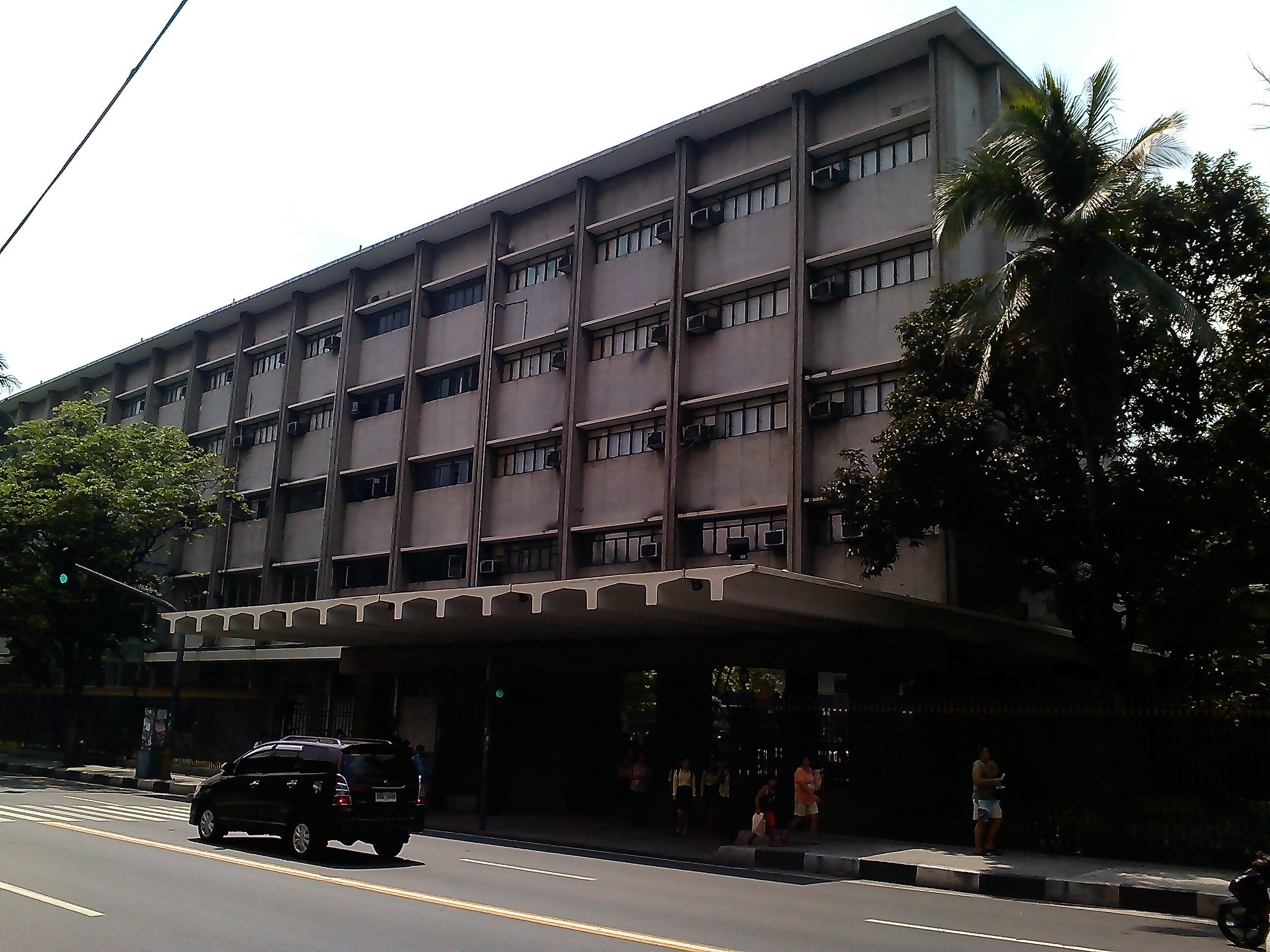
JRU won the NCAA cheerleading competition title in 2008.

School	Last Championship	Last Top 3 Appearance	Rank			Total	Championship Rank
School	Last Championship	Last Top 3 Appearance	1st place, gold medalist(s)	2nd place, silver medalist(s)	3rd place, bronze medalist(s)	Total	Championship Rank
University of Perpetual Help System DALTA	2016	2026	9	8	0	17	1
Arellano University	2026	2026	8	3	0	11	2
Mapúa University	2004	2019	1	4	4	9	3
José Rizal University	2008	2011	1	1	1	3	4
Colegio de San Juan de Letran	-	2026	0	2	7	9	5
San Sebastian College–Recoletos	-	2006	0	1	1	2	6
Emilio Aguinaldo College	-	2016	0	0	3	3	7
De La Salle–College of Saint Benilde	-	2015	0	0	2	2	8
San Beda University	-	2018	0	0	1	1	9
Lyceum of the Philippines University	-	-	0	0	0	0	10
Angeles University Foundation	-	-	0	0	0	0	11
Philippine Christian University	-	-	0	0	0	0	12

== See also ==
- UAAP Cheerdance Competition
- National Cheerleading Championship
- International Federation of Cheerleading
- NCAA Street Dance Competition
- Arellano-Perpetual rivalry
