= NCAA Season 100 =

Sports season in the Philippines

- "Siglo Uno (transl. One century): Inspiring Legacies"
- Host school: Lyceum of the Philippines University

Overall
- Seniors: San Beda University
- Juniors: San Beda University–Rizal

Seniors' champions
| Sport | | Men | Women |
| Basketball | | Mapúa | NT |
| Volleyball | | Arellano | Benilde |
| Badminton | | Benilde | San Beda |
| Taekwondo | | San Beda | San Beda |
| Chess | | San Beda | NT |
| Swimming | | San Beda | San Beda |
| Beach volleyball | | EAC | Letran |
| Table tennis | | San Beda | San Beda |
| Football | | San Beda | NT |
| Lawn tennis | | Benilde | Benilde |
| Soft tennis | | Perpetual | San Beda |
| 3x3 basketball | | JRU | NT |
| Track and field | | JRU | NT |
- Esports: Letran (Ex - Coed)
- Cheerdance: Arellano (Ex - Coed)
- Street dance: Lyceum (Ex - Coed)

Juniors' champions
| Sport | | Boys | Girls |
| Basketball | | Perpetual | NT |
| Volleyball | | Perpetual | Arellano |
| Badminton | | San Sebastian | NT |
| Taekwondo | | San Beda–Rizal | NT |
| Chess | | Lyceum–Cavite | NT |
| Swimming | | San Beda–Rizal | NT |
| Beach volleyball | | Arellano | NT |
| Table tennis | | San Beda–Rizal | NT |
| Football | | San Beda–Rizal | NT |
| Lawn tennis | | Perpetual | NT |
| Soft tennis | | Perpetual | NT |
| 3x3 basketball | | EAC–ICA | NT |
| Kiddie basketball | | EAC–ICA | NT |
| Track and field | | JRU | NT |
- Street dance: Perpetual (Ex - Coed)
- (NT) = No tournament; (DS) = Demonstration Sport; (Ex) = Exhibition;

NCAA Season 100 was the 2024–25 season of the National Collegiate Athletic Association (NCAA) of the Philippines. It was hosted by the Lyceum of the Philippines University. The opening ceremony was held on September 7, 2024 at the SM Mall of Asia Arena.

== Background ==
On June 22, 2024, José Rizal University gave the hosting rights to Lyceum of the Philippines University during the Cheerleading Competition at the Filoil EcoOil Centre. Hercules Callanta, the Lyceum of the Philippines University athletic director and management committee chairman, said that they were planning to partner with the San Juan City government so that all but the opening matches were held at the Filoil EcoOil Centre.

=== 10 Greatest Players ===
With the NCAA celebrating its centennial season, the association planned to compile a list of its 100 greatest players. The known criteria for nomination were as follows:

- The player must be an "exceptional figure" that has competed in any sporting event the league has held.
- The player must have been retired for at least 20 years.
  - This may change since three schools (Arellano, EAC, and Lyceum) have been members for less than 20 years.

The NCAA unveiled the first 10 players during the opening ceremony, with a separate event being planned for the remaining 90 players during the middle of the season. However, that didn't push through, leaving the list with the following ten players, one representing each member school from 2000 onwards:

- Regine Arocha (Arellano Lady Chiefs volleyball)
- Ryan Jacolo (Benilde Blazing Paddlers table tennis)
- Sidney Onwubere (EAC Generals basketball)
- Mark Harry Diones (JRU Heavy Bombers track and field)
- RJ Jazul (Letran Knights basketball)
- CJ Perez (Lyceum Pirates basketball)
- Adrian Nocum (Mapúa Cardinals basketball)
- Louie Ramirez (Perpetual Altas volleyball)
- Baser Amer (San Beda Red Lions basketball)
- Allyn Bulanadi (San Sebastian Stags basketball)

== Sports calendar ==
| Sport | Tournament(s) | | | Host | Duration | Venue(s) | Ref |
| Sport | M | W | J | Host | Duration | Venue(s) | Ref |
|---|---|---|---|---|---|---|---|
| Basketball | check | —N/a | check | Lyceum | September 7 – December 7, 2024 (men's); February 24 – April 15, 2025 (juniors') | SM Mall of Asia Arena, Pasay; Filoil EcoOil Centre, San Juan; Cuneta Astrodome, Pasay; Araneta Coliseum, Quezon City | |
| Volleyball | check | check | check | | February 20 – June 11, 2025 | Filoil EcoOil Centre, San Juan; San Sebastian Gymnasium, Manila; Arellano Gymnasium, Pasay; UPHSD Gymnasium, Las Piñas; EAC Gymnasium, Manila; San Beda University Gymnasium, Manila; Jose Rizal University Gymnasium, Mandaluyong | |
| Beach volleyball | check | check | check | Letran | February 4 – 9, 2025 | Sand Court, Subic, Zambales | |
| Table tennis | check | check | check | San Beda | November 11–15, 2024 | San Beda University Gymnasium, Manila | |
| Chess | check | —N/a | check | | October 26 – November 19, 2024 | Ayala Malls Manila Bay, Parañaque | |
| Badminton | check | check | check | | November 4–22, 2024 | Centro Atletico, Quezon City | |
| Taekwondo | check | check | check | EAC | November 28 – December 6, 2024 | EAC Gymnasium, Manila | |
| Swimming | check | check | check | JRU | December 10 – December 13, 2024 | Rizal Memorial Sports Complex, Manila | |
| Streetdance | (co-ed) | | (co-ed) | Lyceum | December 12, 2024 | Filoil EcoOil Centre, San Juan | |
| Cheerleading | (co-ed) | | —N/a | | May 22, 2025 | SM Mall of Asia Arena, Pasay | |
| Track and field | check | | check | | March 16–18, 2025 | New Clark City Athletics Stadium, Capas, Tarlac | |
| Football | check | | | San Beda | March 22, 2025 – April 26, 2025 | University of Makati Stadium, Taguig | |
| E-Sports | check | —N/a | —N/a | | June 28–29, 2025; July 12–13, 2025; July 25–27, 2025 | SMX Convention Center | |

== Basketball ==
The NCAA basketball championships have two tournaments: the seniors' tournament for male college student athletes, and juniors' tournaments for male senior high school student athletes.

=== Men's tournament ===
The seniors' tournament started on September 7, 2024, and ended on December 7, 2024.

==== Elimination round ====
| Pos | Team | W | L | PCT | GB | Qualification |
|---|---|---|---|---|---|---|
| 1 | Mapúa Cardinals | 15 | 3 | .833 | — | Twice-to-beat in the semifinals |
| 2 | Benilde Blazers | 14 | 4 | .778 | 1 | Twice-to-beat in the semifinals |
| 3 | San Beda Red Lions | 10 | 8 | .556 (Note: Head-to-head point differential: San Beda +14, Lyceum −14) | 5 | Twice-to-win in the semifinals |
| 4 | Lyceum Pirates (H) | 10 | 8 | .556 | 5 | Twice-to-win in the semifinals |
| 5 | EAC Generals | 9 | 9 | .500 | 6 | |
| 6 | Letran Knights | 8 | 10 | .444 | 7 | |
| 7 | Arellano Chiefs | 7 | 11 | .389 (Note: Head-to-head point differential: Arellano +5, Perpetual −5) | 8 | |
| 8 | Perpetual Altas | 7 | 11 | .389 | 8 | |
| 9 | San Sebastian Stags | 6 | 12 | .333 | 9 | |
| 10 | JRU Heavy Bombers | 4 | 14 | .222 | 11 | |

Source: GMA
(H) Hosts

==== Playoffs ====
Semifinals (Top 2 twice-to-beat)
1 | Mapúa | 89
4 | Lyceum | 79
2 | Benilde | 79
3 | San Beda | 63

Finals (Best-of-three playoff)
1 | Mapúa | 84 | 94
2 | Benilde | 73 | 82

==== Awards ====
- Most Valuable Player: Allen Liwag (Benilde Blazers)
- Rookie of the Year: Chris Hubilla (Mapúa Cardinals)

=== Juniors' tournament ===
The juniors' tournament started on February 24, 2025.

==== Elimination round ====
| Pos | Team | W | L | PCT | GB | Qualification |
|---|---|---|---|---|---|---|
| 1 | Perpetual Junior Altas | 8 | 1 | .889 | — | Twice-to-beat in the semifinals |
| 2 | Letran Squires | 6 | 3 | .667 (Note: Head-to-head goal differential: Letran +10, LSGH +7, San Beda −17) | 2 | Twice-to-beat in the semifinals |
| 3 | La Salle Green Hills Greenies | 6 | 3 | .667 | 2 | Twice-to-win in the semifinals |
| 4 | San Beda Red Cubs | 6 | 3 | .667 | 2 | Twice-to-win in the semifinals |
| 5 | EAC–ICA Brigadiers | 5 | 4 | .556 (Note: Head-to-head goal differential: EAC +7, Malayan −7) | 3 | |
| 6 | Mapúa Red Robins | 5 | 4 | .556 | 3 | |
| 7 | Arellano Braves | 3 | 6 | .333 (Note: Head-to-head goal differential: Arellano +19, San Sebastian −19) | 5 | |
| 8 | San Sebastian Staglets | 3 | 6 | .333 | 5 | |
| 9 | JRU Light Bombers | 2 | 7 | .222 | 6 | |
| 10 | Lyceum Junior Pirates (H) | 1 | 8 | .111 | 7 | |

(H) Hosts

==== Playoffs ====
Semifinals (Top 2 twice-to-beat)
1 | Perpetual | 96
4 | San Beda–Rizal | 89
2 | Letran | 74 | 77
3 | LSGH | 78* | 78

Finals (Best-of-three playoff)
1 | Perpetual | 100 | 91 | 101
3 | LSGH | 96 | 95 | 67
Third place playoff
4 | San Beda–Rizal | 74
2 | Letran | 59

*Overtime

==== Awards ====
- Most Valuable Player: Lebron Jhames Daep (Perpetual Junior Altas)
- Rookie of the Year: Allan Laurenaria (Mapúa Red Robins)

== Volleyball ==
=== Men's tournament ===
==== Elimination round ====
| Pos | Team | Pld | W | L | Pts | SW | SL | SR | SPW | SPL | SPR | Qualification |
|---|---|---|---|---|---|---|---|---|---|---|---|---|
| 1 | Benilde Blazers | 18 | 14 | 4 | 40 | 47 | 22 | 2.136 | 1639 | 1509 | 1.086 | Twice-to-beat in the semifinals |
| 2 | Mapúa Cardinals | 18 | 14 | 4 | 36 | 44 | 30 | 1.467 | 1673 | 1583 | 1.057 | Twice-to-beat in the semifinals |
| 3 | Arellano Chiefs (H) | 18 | 13 | 5 | 38 | 45 | 23 | 1.957 | 1610 | 1413 | 1.139 | Twice-to-win in the semifinals |
| 4 | Letran Knights | 18 | 12 | 6 | 38 | 45 | 26 | 1.731 | 1719 | 1484 | 1.158 | Twice-to-win in the semifinals |
| 5 | San Beda Red Spikers | 18 | 10 | 8 | 31 | 38 | 32 | 1.188 | 1609 | 1499 | 1.073 | |
| 6 | Perpetual Altas | 18 | 10 | 8 | 28 | 39 | 34 | 1.147 | 1593 | 1593 | 1.000 | |
| 7 | San Sebastian Stags | 18 | 6 | 12 | 19 | 26 | 41 | 0.634 | 1432 | 1513 | 0.946 | |
| 8 | EAC Generals | 18 | 5 | 13 | 19 | 27 | 42 | 0.643 | 1399 | 1482 | 0.944 | |
| 9 | JRU Heavy Bombers | 18 | 3 | 15 | 11 | 16 | 46 | 0.348 | 1267 | 1484 | 0.854 | |
| 10 | Lyceum Pirates | 18 | 3 | 15 | 10 | 20 | 51 | 0.392 | 1496 | 1733 | 0.863 | |

Source: GMA Integrated News
Rules for classification: 1) Number of wins; 2) match points; 3) sets ratio; 4) points ratio; 5) head-to-head record
(H) Host

==== Playoffs ====
Semifinals (Nos. 1 & 2 have twice-to-beat advantage)
1 | Benilde | 0 | 1
4 | Letran | 3 | 3
2 | Mapúa | 1 | 0
3 | Arellano | 3 | 3

Finals (Best-of-three series)
4 | Letran | 1 | 1
3 | Arellano | 3 | 3
Third place playoff
1 | Benilde | 3
2 | Mapúa | 1

=== Women's tournament ===
==== Elimination round ====
| Pos | Team | Pld | W | L | Pts | SW | SL | SR | SPW | SPL | SPR | Qualification |
|---|---|---|---|---|---|---|---|---|---|---|---|---|
| 1 | Benilde Lady Blazers | 18 | 16 | 2 | 47 | 49 | 11 | 4.455 | 1326 | 1005 | 1.319 | Twice-to-beat in the semifinals |
| 2 | Letran Lady Knights | 18 | 15 | 3 | 45 | 49 | 18 | 2.722 | 1550 | 1375 | 1.127 | Twice-to-beat in the semifinals |
| 3 | Arellano Lady Chiefs (H) | 18 | 12 | 6 | 33 | 42 | 29 | 1.448 | 1519 | 1389 | 1.094 | Twice-to-win in the semifinals |
| 4 | Mapúa Lady Cardinals | 18 | 11 | 7 | 33 | 40 | 29 | 1.379 | 1416 | 1413 | 1.002 | Twice-to-win in the semifinals |
| 5 | Perpetual Lady Altas | 18 | 9 | 9 | 29 | 35 | 34 | 1.029 | 1432 | 1429 | 1.002 | |
| 6 | Lyceum Lady Pirates | 18 | 8 | 10 | 23 | 30 | 40 | 0.750 | 1405 | 1429 | 0.983 | |
| 7 | San Sebastian Lady Stags | 18 | 8 | 10 | 22 | 29 | 37 | 0.784 | 1379 | 1352 | 1.020 | |
| 8 | San Beda Lady Red Spikers | 18 | 4 | 14 | 13 | 23 | 46 | 0.500 | 1309 | 1420 | 0.922 | |
| 9 | EAC Lady Generals | 18 | 4 | 14 | 12 | 19 | 47 | 0.404 | 1218 | 1437 | 0.848 | |
| 10 | JRU Lady Bombers | 18 | 3 | 15 | 13 | 22 | 47 | 0.468 | 1204 | 1428 | 0.843 | |

Source: GMA Integrated News
Rules for classification: 1) Number of wins; 2) match points; 3) sets ratio; 4) points ratio; 5) head-to-head record
(H) Host

==== Playoffs ====
Semifinals (Nos. 1 & 2 have twice-to-beat advantage)
1 | Benilde | 3
4 | Mapúa | 1
2 | Letran | 3
3 | Arellano | 0

Finals (Best-of-three series)
1 | Benilde | 3 | 3
2 | Letran | 1 | 0
Third place playoff
4 | Mapúa | 2
3 | Arellano | 3

=== Boys' tournament ===
==== Elimination round ====
| Pos | Team | Pld | W | L | Pts | SW | SL | SR | SPW | SPL | SPR | Qualification |
|---|---|---|---|---|---|---|---|---|---|---|---|---|
| 1 | Perpetual Junior Altas | 9 | 9 | 0 | 26 | 18 | 1 | 18.000 | 474 | 341 | 1.390 | Twice-to-beat in the semifinals |
| 2 | Letran Squires | 9 | 8 | 1 | 23 | 17 | 5 | 3.400 | 510 | 436 | 1.170 | Twice-to-beat in the semifinals |
| 3 | Malayan Junior Spikers | 9 | 7 | 2 | 19 | 14 | 6 | 2.333 | 473 | 440 | 1.075 | Twice-to-win in the semifinals |
| 4 | Arellano Braves (H) | 9 | 6 | 3 | 20 | 14 | 6 | 2.333 | 493 | 391 | 1.261 | Twice-to-win in the semifinals |
| 5 | JRU Light Bombers | 9 | 5 | 4 | 14 | 10 | 9 | 1.111 | 398 | 423 | 0.941 | |
| 6 | EAC–ICA Brigadiers | 9 | 4 | 5 | 9 | 6 | 12 | 0.500 | 447 | 474 | 0.943 | |
| 7 | Lyceum Junior Pirates | 9 | 3 | 6 | 10 | 8 | 11 | 0.727 | 469 | 481 | 0.975 | |
| 8 | San Beda Junior Red Spikers | 9 | 2 | 7 | 7 | 5 | 14 | 0.357 | 381 | 457 | 0.834 | |
| 9 | San Sebastian Staglets | 9 | 1 | 8 | 5 | 5 | 17 | 0.294 | 460 | 536 | 0.858 | |
| 10 | La Salle Green Hills Greenies | 9 | 0 | 9 | 2 | 2 | 18 | 0.111 | 379 | 501 | 0.756 | |

Rules for classification: 1) Number of wins; 2) match points; 3) sets ratio; 4) points ratio; 5) head-to-head record
(H) Host

==== Playoffs ====
Semifinals (Nos. 1 & 2 have twice-to-beat advantage)
1 | Perpetual | 3
4 | Arellano | 1
2 | Letran | 3
3 | Malayan | 1

Finals (Best-of-three series)
1 | Perpetual | 3 | 1 | 3
2 | Letran | 0 | 3 | 2
Third place playoff
4 | Arellano | 3
3 | Malayan | 0

*If necessary

=== Girls' tournament ===
==== Elimination round ====
| Pos | Team | Pld | W | L | Pts | SW | SL | SR | SPW | SPL | SPR | Qualification |
|---|---|---|---|---|---|---|---|---|---|---|---|---|
| 1 | Perpetual Junior Lady Altas | 6 | 6 | 0 | 17 | 12 | 1 | 12.000 | 307 | 237 | 1.295 | Twice-to-beat in the semifinals |
| 2 | Arellano Lady Braves (H) | 6 | 5 | 1 | 12 | 10 | 5 | 2.000 | 358 | 272 | 1.316 | Twice-to-beat in the semifinals |
| 3 | EAC–ICA Lady Brigadiers | 6 | 4 | 2 | 14 | 8 | 4 | 2.000 | 347 | 280 | 1.239 | Twice-to-win in the semifinals |
| 4 | Lyceum Junior Lady Pirates | 6 | 3 | 3 | 9 | 7 | 7 | 1.000 | 269 | 271 | 0.993 | Twice-to-win in the semifinals |
| 5 | JRU Light Lady Bombers | 6 | 2 | 4 | 8 | 6 | 5 | 1.200 | 369 | 308 | 1.198 | |
| 6 | San Beda Junior Lady Red Spikers | 6 | 1 | 5 | 3 | 2 | 10 | 0.200 | 193 | 289 | 0.668 | |
| 7 | La Salle Lady Greenies | 6 | 0 | 6 | 0 | 0 | 12 | 0.000 | 172 | 300 | 0.573 | |

Rules for classification: 1) Number of wins; 2) match points; 3) sets ratio; 4) points ratio; 5) head-to-head record
(H) Host

==== Playoffs ====
Semifinals (Nos. 1 & 2 have twice-to-beat advantage)
1 | Perpetual | 2 | 3
4 | Lyceum–Cavite | 3 | 0
2 | Arellano | 3
3 | EAC–ICA | 0

Finals (Best-of-three series)
1 | Perpetual | 1 | 2
2 | Arellano | 3 | 3
Third place playoff
4 | Lyceum–Cavite | 0
3 | EAC–ICA | 3

== Football ==
The seniors' NCAA football championship started on March 22, 2025 at the University of Makati Stadium.

=== Seniors' tournament ===
==== Elimination round ====
| Pos | Team | Pld | W | D | L | GF | GA | GD | Pts | Qualification |
|---|---|---|---|---|---|---|---|---|---|---|
| 1 | San Beda Red Booters | 4 | 4 | 0 | 0 | 18 | 0 | +18 | 12 | Twice-to-beat in semifinals |
| 2 | Benilde Blazing Strikers | 4 | 2 | 1 | 1 | 12 | 5 | +7 | 7 | Twice-to-beat in semifinals |
| 3 | EAC Generals | 4 | 2 | 1 | 1 | 9 | 2 | +7 | 7 | Twice-to-win in semifinals |
| 4 | Mapúa Cardinals | 4 | 1 | 0 | 3 | 5 | 17 | −12 | 3 | Twice-to-win in semifinals |
| 5 | Perpetual Altas | 4 | 0 | 0 | 4 | 1 | 21 | −20 | 0 | |

==== Finals ====
April 26, 2025
5:00pm

| Benilde Strikers | 0–1 | San Beda Red Booters |
|---|---|---|
| | | Aningalan 46' |

University of Makati Stadium, Taguig

==== Awards ====
- Most Valuable Player: Amir Aningalan (San Beda Red Lions)
- Best Striker: Josh Asignar (Benilde Blazers)
- Best Midfielder: Louise Bronda (EAC Generals)
- Best Defender: Eldwin Escosora (San Beda Red Lions)
- Best Goalkeeper: Pedro Tagara Jr. (San Beda Red Lions)
- Rookie of the year: Sam Salingay (San Beda Red Lions)
- Freshman of the year: Frank Semilla (Benilde Blazers)
- Coach of the year: Christopher Pedimonte (San Beda Red Lions)

== Swimming ==
The San Beda Red Sea Lions and Lady Red Sea Lions won their respective 21-peat and 11-peat swimming championships held at the Teofilo Yldefonso Swimming Pool, Rizal Memorial Sports Complex, Manila. The Benilde Blazing Torpedoes finished second in the men's and women's tournament, while the Letran Aquaknights and the Perpetual Altas Tankers placed 3rd in the men's and women's divisions respectively. The San Beda Junior Red Sea Lions dethroned the 3-peat champions, the LSGH Greenies in the junior's division, while the LSGH Greenies and Letran Squires garnered 1st runner up and 2nd runner up respectively.

| Rank | Men's division | Score | Rank | Women's division | Score | Rank | Junior's division | Score |
|---|---|---|---|---|---|---|---|---|
| 1st place, gold medalist(s) | San Beda Red Lions | 1,278.50 | 1st place, gold medalist(s) | San Beda Red Lionesses | 1,470.50 | 1st place, gold medalist(s) | San Beda Red Cubs | 1,153.25 |
| 2nd place, silver medalist(s) | Benilde Blazers | 758 | 2nd place, silver medalist(s) | Benilde Lady Blazers | 581.50 | 2nd place, silver medalist(s) | La Salle Green Hills Greenies | 793.25 |
| 3rd place, bronze medalist(s) | Letran Knights | 320.50 | 3rd place, bronze medalist(s) | Perpetual Lady Altas | 422.25 | 3rd place, bronze medalist(s) | Letran Squires | 394.50 |
| 4th | Perpetual Altas | 198.25 | 4th | EAC Lady Generals | 232 | 4th | Lyceum Junior Pirates | 207 |
| 5th | Mapúa Cardinals | 183 | 5th | Letran Lady Knights | 121.75 | 5th | Perpetual Junior Altas | 197.50 |
| 6th | San Sebastian Stags | 127.50 | 6th | Mapúa Lady Cardinals | 85 | 6th | JRU Light Bombers | 185 |
| 7th | EAC Generals | 114.75 | 7th | Arellano Lady Chiefs | 53.50 | 7th | San Sebastian Staglets | 66 |
| 8th | Arellano Chiefs | 72.50 | 8th | San Sebastian Lady Stags | 42.50 | 8th | EAC–ICA Brigadiers | 42 |
| 9th | Lyceum Pirates | 49.50 | 9th | Lyceum Lady Pirates | 37.50 | 9th | Arellano Braves | 36.50 |
| 10th | JRU Heavy Bombers | 7.50 | 10th | JRU Lady Bombers | 0 | 10th | Mapúa Red Robins | 16 |

== Beach volleyball ==
The NCAA Beach Volleyball tournaments started on February 4, 2025, in the Subic Bay Sand Courts in Olongapo.

=== Men's tournament ===
==== Team standings ====
| Pos | Team | Pld | W | L | Pts | Qualification |
|---|---|---|---|---|---|---|
| 1 | EAC Generals | 9 | 9 | 0 | 18 | Twice-to-beat in the semifinals |
| 2 | Perpetual Altas | 9 | 8 | 1 | 17 | Twice-to-beat in the semifinals |
| 3 | Benilde Blazers | 9 | 7 | 2 | 16 | Twice-to-win in the semifinals |
| 4 | San Beda Red Spikers | 9 | 4 | 5 | 13 | Twice-to-win in the semifinals |
| 5 | Arellano Chiefs | 9 | 4 | 5 | 13 | |
| 6 | San Sebastian Stags | 9 | 4 | 5 | 13 | |
| 7 | Letran Knights (H) | 9 | 3 | 6 | 12 | |
| 8 | JRU Heavy Bombers | 9 | 3 | 6 | 12 | |
| 9 | Mapúa Cardinals | 9 | 2 | 7 | 11 | |
| 10 | Lyceum Pirates | 9 | 1 | 8 | 10 | |

Rules for classification: 1) Number of wins; 2) match points; 3) head-to-head record
(H) Hosts

==== Playoffs ====
Semifinals (Nos. 1 & 2 have twice-to-beat advantage)
1 | EAC | 2
4 | San Beda | 1
2 | Perpetual | 1 | 0
3 | Benilde | 2 | 2

Finals
1 | EAC | 2
3 | Benilde | 0
Battle for Third
4 | San Beda | 1
2 | Perpetual | 2

===== Match results =====
All times are Philippine Standard Time (UTC+08:00).

Semifinals: EAC vs. San Beda (EAC has a twice-to-beat advantage)
| Date | Time | Team 1 | Score | Team 2 | Set 1 | Set 2 | Set 3 |
|---|---|---|---|---|---|---|---|
| Feb 8 | 15:00 | EAC Generals | 2–0 | San Beda Red Spikers | 21–17 | 21–18 | — |

Semifinals: Perpetual vs. Benilde (Perpetual has a twice-to-beat advantage)
| Date | Time | Team 1 | Score | Team 2 | Set 1 | Set 2 | Set 3 |
|---|---|---|---|---|---|---|---|
| Feb 8 | 15:45 | Perpetual Altas | 1–2 | Benilde Blazers | 29–27 | 19–21 | 14–16 |
| Feb 9 | 07:00 | Benilde Blazers | 2–0 | Perpetual Altas | 21–17 | 21–17 | – |

Battle for Third
| Date | Time | Team 1 | Score | Team 2 | Set 1 | Set 2 | Set 3 |
|---|---|---|---|---|---|---|---|
| Feb 9 | 10:00 | Perpetual Altas | 2–1 | San Beda Red Spikers | 13–21 | 22–20 | 15–11 |

Finals
| Date | Time | Team 1 | Score | Team 2 | Set 1 | Set 2 | Set 3 |
|---|---|---|---|---|---|---|---|
| Feb 9 | 15:00 | EAC Generals | 2–0 | Benilde Blazers | 21–16 | 21–16 | – |

=== Women's tournament ===
==== Team standings ====
| Pos | Team | Pld | W | L | Pts | Qualification |
|---|---|---|---|---|---|---|
| 1 | Lyceum Lady Pirates | 9 | 8 | 1 | 17 | Twice-to-beat in the semifinals |
| 2 | Letran Lady Knights (H) | 9 | 7 | 2 | 16 | Twice-to-beat in the semifinals |
| 3 | EAC Lady Generals | 9 | 6 | 3 | 15 | Twice-to-win in the semifinals |
| 4 | San Beda Lady Red Spikers | 9 | 6 | 3 | 15 | Twice-to-win in the semifinals |
| 5 | Benilde Lady Blazers | 9 | 5 | 4 | 14 | |
| 6 | Perpetual Lady Altas | 9 | 5 | 4 | 14 | |
| 7 | Arellano Lady Chiefs | 9 | 4 | 5 | 13 | |
| 8 | JRU Lady Bombers | 9 | 2 | 7 | 11 | |
| 9 | San Sebastian Lady Stags | 9 | 2 | 7 | 11 | |
| 10 | Mapúa Lady Cardinals | 9 | 0 | 9 | 9 | |

Rules for classification: 1) Number of wins; 2) match points; 3) head-to-head record
(H) Hosts

==== Playoffs ====
Semifinals (Nos. 1 & 2 have twice-to-beat advantage)
1 | Lyceum | 2
4 | San Beda | 0
2 | Letran | 2
3 | EAC | 0

Finals
1 | Lyceum | 1
2 | Letran | 2
Battle for Third
4 | San Beda | 2
3 | EAC | 1

===== Match results =====
All times are Philippine Standard Time (UTC+08:00).

Semifinals: Lyceum vs. San Beda (Lyceum has a twice-to-beat advantage)
| Date | Time | Team 1 | Score | Team 2 | Set 1 | Set 2 | Set 3 |
|---|---|---|---|---|---|---|---|
| Feb 8 | 15:00 | Lyceum Lady Pirates | 2–0 | San Beda Lady Red Spikers | 21–9 | 25–23 | — |

Semifinals: Letran vs. EAC (Letran has a twice-to-beat advantage)
| Date | Time | Team 1 | Score | Team 2 | Set 1 | Set 2 | Set 3 |
|---|---|---|---|---|---|---|---|
| Feb 8 | 15:45 | Letran Lady Knights | 2–0 | EAC Lady Generals | 21–10 | 21–9 | — |

Battle for Third
| Date | Time | Team 1 | Score | Team 2 | Set 1 | Set 2 | Set 3 |
|---|---|---|---|---|---|---|---|
| Feb 9 | 10:00 | San Beda Red Lionesses | 2–1 | EAC Lady Generals | 21–17 | 12–21 | 15–10 |

Finals
| Date | Time | Team 1 | Score | Team 2 | Set 1 | Set 2 | Set 3 |
|---|---|---|---|---|---|---|---|
| Feb 9 | 16:00 | Lyceum Lady Pirates | 1–2 | Letran Lady Knights | 10–21 | 21–16 | 13–15 |

=== Juniors' tournament ===
==== Team standings ====
| Pos | Team | Pld | W | L | Pts | Qualification |
|---|---|---|---|---|---|---|
| 1 | Arellano Braves | 9 | 9 | 0 | 18 | Twice-to-beat in the semifinals |
| 2 | EAC–ICA Brigadiers | 9 | 8 | 1 | 17 | Twice-to-beat in the semifinals |
| 3 | Letran Squires (H) | 9 | 6 | 3 | 15 | Twice-to-win in the semifinals |
| 4 | Mapúa Red Robins | 9 | 6 | 3 | 15 | Twice-to-win in the semifinals |
| 5 | JRU Light Bombers | 9 | 5 | 4 | 14 | |
| 6 | Perpetual Junior Altas | 9 | 5 | 4 | 14 | |
| 7 | Lyceum Junior Pirates | 9 | 3 | 6 | 12 | |
| 8 | San Sebastian Staglets | 9 | 2 | 7 | 11 | |
| 9 | San Beda Junior Red Spikers | 9 | 1 | 8 | 10 | |
| 10 | La Salle Green Hills Greenies | 9 | 0 | 9 | 9 | |

Rules for classification: 1) Number of wins; 2) match points; 3) head-to-head record
(H) Hosts

==== Playoffs ====
Semifinals (Nos. 1 & 2 have twice-to-beat advantage)
1 | Arellano | 1 | 2
4 | Malayan | 2 | 1
2 | EAC–ICA | 1 | 2
3 | Letran | 2 | 1

Finals
1 | Arellano | 2
2 | EAC–ICA | 1
Battle for Third
4 | Malayan | 0
3 | Letran | 2

===== Match results =====
All times are Philippine Standard Time (UTC+08:00).

Semifinals: Arellano vs. Malayan (Arellano has a twice-to-beat advantage)
| Date | Time | Team 1 | Score | Team 2 | Set 1 | Set 2 | Set 3 |
|---|---|---|---|---|---|---|---|
| Feb 8 | 15:00 | Arellano Braves | 1–2 | Mapúa Red Robins | 21–9 | 21–23 | 10–15 |
| Feb 9 | 08:00 | Mapúa Red Robins | 1–2 | Arellano Braves | 21–19 | 11–21 | 15–9 |

Semifinals: EAC–ICA vs. Letran (EAC–ICA has a twice-to-beat advantage)
| Date | Time | Team 1 | Score | Team 2 | Set 1 | Set 2 | Set 3 |
|---|---|---|---|---|---|---|---|
| Feb 8 | 15:45 | EAC–ICA Brigadiers | 1–2 | Letran Squires | 21–17 | 17–21 | 12–15 |
| Feb 9 | 07:00 | Letran Squires | 1–2 | EAC–ICA Brigadiers | 21–8 | 19–21 | 12–15 |

Battle for Third
| Date | Time | Team 1 | Score | Team 2 | Set 1 | Set 2 | Set 3 |
|---|---|---|---|---|---|---|---|
| Feb 9 | 10:00 | Letran Squires | 2–0 | Mapúa Red Robins | 21–13 | 21–15 | — |

Finals
| Date | Time | Team 1 | Score | Team 2 | Set 1 | Set 2 | Set 3 |
|---|---|---|---|---|---|---|---|
| Feb 9 | 14:00 | Arellano Braves | 2–1 | EAC–ICA Brigadiers | 19–21 | 21–13 | 15–12 |

== Cheerleading ==
The NCAA Cheerleading Competition was held on May 22, 2025, at the SM Mall of Asia Arena. Only nine teams participated in the competition as Lyceum of the Philippines University was not able to reach the minimum number of athletes required for the tournament.

=== Team standings ===
| Rank | Team | Order | Tumbling | Stunts | Tosses | Pyramids | Dance | Penalties | Points | Percentage |
|---|---|---|---|---|---|---|---|---|---|---|
| 1st place, gold medalist(s) | AU Chiefsquad | 7th | | | | | | 0 | 218 | 0% |
| 2nd place, silver medalist(s) | Altas Perpsquad | 2nd | | | | | | 0 | 213.50 | 0% |
| 3rd place, bronze medalist(s) | Letran Cheering Squad | 4th | | | | | | 0 | 210.50 | 0% |
| 4 | Mapúa Cheerping Cardinals | 3rd | | | | | | 0 | 193.50 | 0% |
| 5 | San Beda Red Corps | 9th | | | | | | 0 | 190.50 | 0% |
| 6 | Benilde Blazers Pep Squad | 1st | | | | | | 0 | 184 | 0% |
| 7 | EAC Generals Pep Squad | 8th | | | | | | 0 | 170 | 0% |
| 8 | JRU Pep Squad | 6th | | | | | | 0 | 162.50 | 0% |
| 9 | Golden Stags Cheerleading Squad | 5th | | | | | | 0 | 144.50 | 0% |
| | LPU Pirates Pep Squad | Exhibition Performance | | | | | | | | |

=== Awards ===
NCAA Season 100 cheerleading champions
Arellano Chiefs
Seventh title, sixth consecutive title

== E-Sports ==
=== Preliminary round ===
==== Team standings ====
Group A
| Pos | Team | MP | W | L | Pts |
|---|---|---|---|---|---|
| 1 | JRU Heavy Bombers | 4 | 7 | 2 | 10 |
| 2 | Mapúa Cardinals | 4 | 6 | 2 | 9 |
| 3 | EAC Generals | 4 | 4 | 4 | 6 |
| 4 | Perpetual Altas | 4 | 4 | 5 | 5 |
| 5 | San Beda Red Lions | 4 | 0 | 8 | 6 |

Group B
| Pos | Team | MP | W | L | Pts |
|---|---|---|---|---|---|
| 1 | Letran Knights | 4 | 8 | 2 | 10 |
| 2 | Lyceum Pirates | 4 | 7 | 2 | 10 |
| 3 | San Sebastian Stags | 4 | 4 | 4 | 6 |
| 4 | Benilde Blazers | 4 | 3 | 6 | 4 |
| 5 | Arellano Chiefs | 4 | 0 | 8 | 0 |

Seeded to Double Eliminations in the final round
Advanced to Eliminations in the final round
Eliminated

==== Match results ====
Group A
| Date | Time | Team 1 | Series | Team 2 |
|---|---|---|---|---|
| Jun 28 | 13:00 | San Beda Red Lions | 0–2 | Mapúa Cardinals |
| Jun 28 | 17:00 | JRU Heavy Bombers | 2–0 | EAC Generals |
| Jun 29 | 11:00 | San Beda Red Lions | 0–2 | EAC Generals |
| Jun 29 | 17:00 | EAC Generals | 0–2 | Mapúa Cardinals |
| Jun 29 | 19:00 | JRU Heavy Bombers | 1–2 | Perpetual Altas |
| Jul 12 | 11:00 | EAC Generals | 2–0 | Perpetual Altas |
| Jul 12 | 15:00 | JRU Heavy Bombers | 2–0 | San Beda Red Lions |
| Jul 13 | 13:00 | Mapúa Cardinals | 2–0 | Perpetual Altas |
| Jul 13 | 17:00 | San Beda Red Lions | 0–2 | Perpetual Altas |
| Jul 13 | 19:00 | Mapúa Cardinals | 0–2 | JRU Heavy Bombers |

Group B
| Date | Time | Team 1 | Series | Team 2 |
|---|---|---|---|---|
| Jun 28 | 11:00 | Lyceum Pirates | 1–2 | Letran Knights |
| Jun 28 | 15:00 | San Sebastian Stags | 2–0 | Arellano Chiefs |
| Jun 28 | 19:00 | Benilde Blazers | 0–2 | Lyceum Pirates |
| Jun 29 | 13:00 | Benilde Blazers | 0–2 | San Sebastian Stags |
| Jun 29 | 15:00 | Arellano Chiefs | 0–2 | Letran Knights |
| Jul 12 | 13:00 | San Sebastian Stags | 0–2 | Lyceum Pirates |
| Jul 12 | 17:00 | Benilde Blazers | 2–0 | Arellano Chiefs |
| Jul 12 | 19:00 | San Sebastian Stags | 0–2 | Letran Knights |
| Jul 13 | 11:00 | Arellano Chiefs | 0–2 | Lyceum Pirates |
| Jul 13 | 15:00 | Benilde Blazers | 1–2 | Letran Knights |

=== Final round ===
==== Bracket ====
Qualification (Best-of-five)
B2 | Lyceum | 3
A3 | EAC | 0
A2 | Mapúa | 3
B3 | San Sebastian | 0

Upper Bracket Semifinals (Best-of-three)
A1 | JRU | 2
B2 | Lyceum | 1
B1 | Letran | 2
A2 | Mapúa | 1
Lower Bracket Elimination (Best-of-five)
B2 | Lyceum | 0
A2 | Mapúa | 3

Upper Bracket Finals (Best-of-five)
A1 | JRU | 3
B1 | Letran | 1
Lower Bracket Finals (Best-of-five)
B1 | Letran | 3
A2 | Mapúa | 1

Grand Finals (Best-of-five)
A1 | JRU | 1
B1 | Letran | 3

==== Match results ====
Qualification (Best-of-5)
| Date | Time | Team 1 | Series | Team 2 |
|---|---|---|---|---|
| Jul 25 | 13:00 | Lyceum Pirates (B2) | 3–0 | (A3) EAC Generals |
| Jul 25 | 16:00 | Mapúa Cardinals (A2) | 3–0 | (B3) San Sebastian Stags |

Upper Bracket Semifinals (Best-of-3)
| Date | Time | Team 1 | Series | Team 2 |
|---|---|---|---|---|
| Jul 26 | 10:00 | JRU Heavy Bombers (A1) | 2–1 | (B2) Lyceum Pirates |
| Jul 26 | 12:00 | Letran Knights (B1) | 2–1 | (A2) Mapúa Cardinals |

Lower Bracket Elimination (Best-of-5)
| Date | Time | Team 1 | Series | Team 2 |
|---|---|---|---|---|
| Jul 26 | 14:00 | Lyceum Pirates (B2) | 0–3 | (A2) Mapúa Cardinals |

Upper Bracket Finals (Best-of-5)
| Date | Time | Team 1 | Series | Team 2 |
|---|---|---|---|---|
| Jul 27 | 10:00 | JRU Heavy Bombers (A1) | 3–1 | (B1) Letran Knights |

Lower Bracket Finals (Best-of-5)
| Date | Time | Team 1 | Series | Team 2 |
|---|---|---|---|---|
| Jul 27 | 13:00 | Letran Knights (B1) | 3–1 | (A2) Mapúa Cardinals |

Grand Finals (Best-of-5)
| Date | Time | Team 1 | Series | Team 2 |
|---|---|---|---|---|
| Jul 27 | 16:00 | JRU Heavy Bombers (A1) | 1–3 | (B1) Letran Knights |

==== Awards ====
NCAA Season 100 esports champions
Letran Knights
First title

6-man Roster:
Loyola, Corpuz, Mercado, San Diego, Acera, Imbang

==== Final Standing ====
| Rank | Team |
|---|---|
| 1st place, gold medalist(s) | Letran Knights |
| 2nd place, silver medalist(s) | JRU Heavy Bombers |
| 3rd place, bronze medalist(s) | Mapúa Cardinals |
| 4 | Lyceum Pirates |
| 5 | EAC Generals |
| 6 | San Sebastian Stags |
| 7 | Perpetual Altas |
| 8 | Benilde Blazers |
| 9 | San Beda Red Lions |
| 10 | Arellano Chiefs |

== General championship summary ==
=== Medal tables ===
==== Seniors' division ====
| Rank | Team | Gold | Silver | Bronze | Total |
|---|---|---|---|---|---|
| 1 | San Beda University | 10 | 3 | 3 | 16 |
| 2 | De La Salle–College of Saint Benilde | 4 | 8 | 5 | 17 |
| 3 | José Rizal University | 2 | 0 | 1 | 3 |
| 4 | University of Perpetual Help System DALTA | 1 | 2 | 5 | 8 |
| 5 | Colegio de San Juan de Letran | 1 | 2 | 1 | 4 |
| 6 | Mapúa University | 1 | 1 | 3 | 5 |
| 7 | Arellano University | 1 | 1 | 1 | 3 |
| 8 | Emilio Aguinaldo College | 1 | 0 | 2 | 3 |
| 9 | San Sebastian College–Recoletos | 0 | 2 | 1 | 3 |
| 10 | Lyceum of the Philippines University* | 0 | 2 | 0 | 2 |
| Totals (10 entries) | | 21 | 21 | 22 | 64 |

* Host nation (Season host); General champions
Notes: Results are final.

==== Juniors' division ====
| Rank | Team | Gold | Silver | Bronze | Total |
|---|---|---|---|---|---|
| 1 | San Beda University–Rizal | 4 | 4 | 3 | 11 |
| 2 | University of Perpetual Help System DALTA | 3 | 3 | 1 | 7 |
| 3 | EAC–Immaculate Conception Academy | 2 | 2 | 1 | 5 |
| 4 | Arellano University | 2 | 0 | 3 | 5 |
| 5 | Lyceum of the Philippines University–Cavite* | 1 | 0 | 1 | 2 |
| 6 | José Rizal University | 1 | 0 | 0 | 1 |
| 6 | San Sebastian College–Recoletos | 1 | 0 | 0 | 1 |
| 8 | La Salle Green Hills | 0 | 3 | 0 | 3 |
| 9 | Colegio de San Juan de Letran | 0 | 1 | 3 | 4 |
| 10 | Malayan High School of Science | 0 | 1 | 1 | 2 |
| Totals (10 entries) | | 14 | 14 | 13 | 41 |

* Host nation (Season host); General champions
Notes: Results are final.

=== General championship tally ===
==== Seniors' division ====
| | | Basketball | 3x3 basketball | Volleyball (indoor) | | Volleyball (beach) | | Swimming | | Chess | Tennis | | Soft tennis | | Table tennis | | Badminton | | Taekwondo | | Football | Athletics | Total | | |
| Rank | Team | M | M | M | W | M | W | M | W | M | M | W | M | W | M | W | M | W | M | W | M | M | M | W | Overall |
|---|---|---|---|---|---|---|---|---|---|---|---|---|---|---|---|---|---|---|---|---|---|---|---|---|---|
| 1 | San Beda | 35 | 40 | 25 | 10 | 30 | 35 | 50 | 50 | 50 | 35 | 30 | 40 | 50 | 50 | 50 | 40 | 50 | 50 | 50 | 50 | 20 | 515 | 325 | 840 |
| 2 | Benilde | 40 | 35 | 35 | 50 | 40 | 25 | 40 | 40 | 25 | 50 | 50 | 35 | 40 | 40 | 35 | 50 | 30 | 30 | 40 | 40 | 35 | 495 | 310 | 805 |
| 3 | Perpetual | 10 | 30 | 20 | 25 | 35 | 20 | 30 | 35 | 30 | 40 | 35 | 50 | 35 | 35 | 40 | — | — | — | — | 25 | — | 305 | 190 | 495 |
| 4 | EAC | 25 | — | 10 | 8 | 50 | 30 | 20 | 30 | 20 | 15 | 25 | — | — | 25 | 25 | 15 | 20 | 35 | 35 | 30 | — | 245 | 173 | 418 |
| 5 | Mapúa | 50 | — | 30 | 30 | 8 | 6 | 25 | 20 | 15 | 35 | — | — | — | 30 | 30 | 20 | 35 | — | — | 35 | 40 | 288 | 121 | 409 |
| 6 | Arellano | 15 | — | 50 | 35 | 25 | 15 | 10 | 10 | 8 | — | — | — | — | — | — | 30 | 15 | 40 | 30 | — | — | 178 | 105 | 283 |
| 7 | Letran | 20 | — | 40 | 40 | 15 | 50 | 35 | 25 | 6 | 25 | — | — | — | — | — | — | — | — | — | — | — | 141 | 115 | 256 |
| 8 | San Sebastian | 8 | — | 15 | 15 | 20 | 8 | 15 | 15 | 10 | 20 | 40 | — | — | — | — | 35 | 40 | — | — | — | — | 123 | 118 | 241 |
| 9 | Lyceum (H) | 30 | — | 6 | 20 | 6 | 40 | 8 | 8 | 40 | — | — | — | — | 15 | 15 | 25 | 25 | — | — | — | — | 130 | 108 | 238 |
| 10 | JRU | 6 | 50 | 8 | 6 | 10 | 10 | 6 | 6 | 35 | — | — | — | — | 20 | 20 | — | — | — | — | — | 50 | 185 | 42 | 227 |

(H) Season host; = Champion; = Runner-up; = Third place; — = No team.
Notes: Results are final.

==== Juniors' division ====
| | | Basketball | | 3x3 basketball | Volleyball (indoor) | | Volleyball (beach) | Swimming | Chess | Tennis | Table tennis | Badminton | Taekwondo | Football | Athletics | Total | | |
| Rank | Team | B | K | B | B | G | B | B | B | B | B | B | B | B | B | B | G | Overall |
|---|---|---|---|---|---|---|---|---|---|---|---|---|---|---|---|---|---|---|
| 1 | SBU–R | 35 | 40 | 35 | 10 | 20 | 8 | 50 | 40 | 35 | 50 | 40 | 50 | 50 | 40 | 443 | 20 | 503 |
| 2 | Perpetual | 50 | — | 40 | 50 | 40 | 20 | 20 | 20 | 50 | 40 | — | — | — | 35 | 325 | 40 | 365 |
| 3 | EAC–ICA | 25 | 50 | 50 | 20 | 30 | 40 | 10 | 8 | — | 35 | 20 | 40 | — | — | 248 | 30 | 328 |
| 4 | Arellano | 15 | 35 | — | 35 | 50 | 50 | 8 | 30 | — | — | 15 | 35 | — | — | 188 | 50 | 273 |
| 5 | JRU | 8 | — | 30 | 25 | 25 | 25 | 30 | 10 | — | 25 | — | — | — | 50 | 203 | 25 | 228 |
| 6 | Malayan | 20 | — | — | 30 | — | 30 | 6 | 35 | 40 | 25 | 30 | — | — | — | 216 | 0 | 216 |
| 7 | LSGH | 40 | — | — | 6 | 15 | 6 | 40 | 15 | — | 20 | 25 | — | 40 | — | 192 | 15 | 207 |
| 8 | Letran | 30 | — | — | 40 | — | 35 | 35 | 6 | — | — | 35 | — | — | — | 181 | 0 | 181 |
| 9 | LPU–C (H) | 6 | — | — | 15 | 35 | 15 | 25 | 50 | — | — | — | — | — | — | 111 | 35 | 146 |
| 10 | San Sebastian | 10 | — | — | 8 | — | 10 | 15 | 25 | — | — | 50 | — | — | — | 118 | 0 | 118 |

(H) Season host; = Champion; = Runner-up; = Third place; — = No team.
Notes: Results are final.

== See also ==
- UAAP Season 87
