= Our Lady of Fatima University =

Private university in Valenzuela, Philippines

- Pamantasang Birhen ng Fatima (Filipino); Universidad de Nuestra Señora de Fátima (Spanish)
- Former names: Our Lady of Fatima College (1973–1979); Our Lady of Fatima College of Medicine (1979–2002)
- Motto: Veritas et Misericordia
- Motto in English: Truth and Compassion
- Type: Private Non-sectarian Coeducational basic and higher education institution
- Established: 1973; 53 years ago
- Founders: Jose C. Olivares; Vicente M. Santos
- Religious affiliation: Non-sectarian
Academic affiliations
ACSCU; AMSA; APMC	MTIAP NYSBE PACUCOA
- President: Dr. Caroline Marian S. Enriquez
- Location: 120 McArthur Highway, Valenzuela City, Metro Manila, Philippines; 14°40′41″N 120°58′51″E
- Campus: Main Valenzuela City, Metro Manila Satellite; Quezon City, Metro Manila; Antipolo City, Rizal; San Fernando City, Pampanga; Cabanatuan City, Nueva Ecija; Santa Rosa City, Laguna, Cavite
- Colors: Green and White
- Nickname: Fatimanian
- Sporting affiliations: NAASCU
- Mascot: Fatima Phoenix
- Website: www.fatima.edu.ph
- Location in Metro Manila Location in Luzon Location in the Philippines
- "Rise to the top"

Our Lady of Fatima University (OLFU) is a private, nonsectarian, coeducational basic and higher education institution in the Philippines.

== History ==
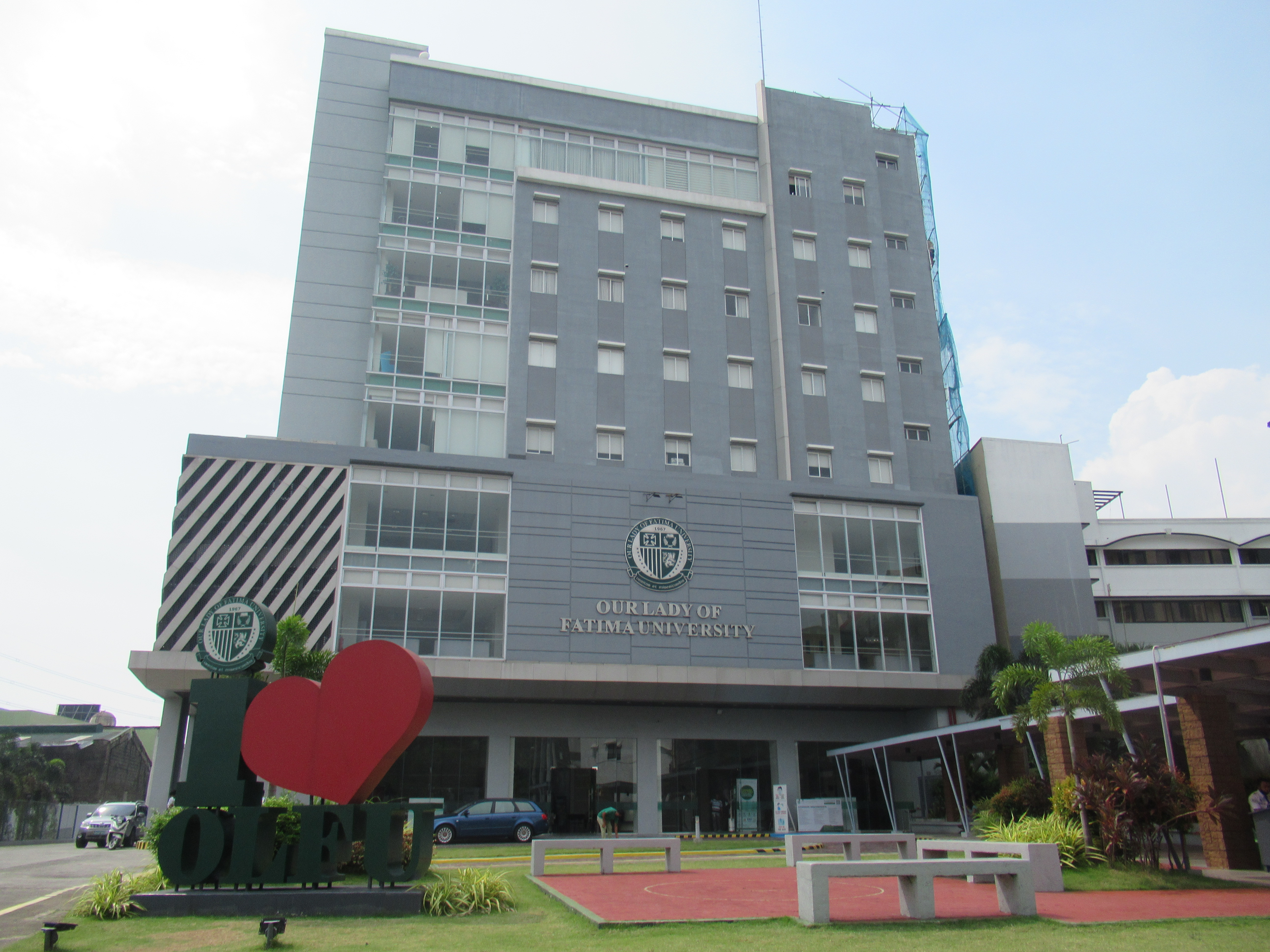
Our Lady of Fatima University (Valenzuela Campus) in August 2022

In 1967, Jose C. Olivares, with his son-in-law, Dr. Vicente M. Santos Sr., founded the Our Lady of Fatima Hospital in Valenzuela City. In 1973 he expanded the hospital to include a nursing college.

In 1979 the Fatima College of Medicine was established, with its pioneer batch graduating in 1983. In the 1990s the college diversified, starting programs in computer science, maritime education, education, psychology, biology, tourism and business.

The college became a university in December 2002, with Dr. Vicente M. Santos Sr. as its founding president.

The next years further saw an increase in infrastructure development. New buildings were established in the Valenzuela and Quezon City campuses, with additional nursing virtual laboratories and simulators. Fatima's College of Nursing was designated by the Commission on Higher Education (CHED) as a Center of Development in 2008. Fatima's expansion continued with the establishment of additional campuses in Antipolo, Pampanga, Nueva Ecija, and Sta. Rosa, Laguna.

The university submitted itself to the CHED's Institutional Quality Assurance through Monitoring and Evaluation (IQuAME) in 2008. In 2009 it was placed in Category A(t) as a mature teaching university.

The CHED granted autonomous status to the university for five years from March 11, 2009, to March 30, 2014.

== Campuses ==
The university has six campuses which are located in:

- Valenzuela City, Metro Manila
  - Our Lady of Fatima University – Valenzuela
  - Fatima University Medical Center – Valenzuela
  - College of Medicine
- Quezon City, Metro Manila
  - Our Lady of Fatima University – QC
- Antipolo City, Rizal
  - Our Lady of Fatima University – Antipolo
  - Fatima University Medical Center – Antipolo
- San Fernando City, Pampanga
  - Our Lady of Fatima University – Pampanga
- Cabanatuan City, Nueva Ecija
  - Our Lady of Fatima University – Nueva Ecija
- Santa Rosa City, Laguna
  - Our Lady of Fatima University – Laguna

== Accreditation ==
The Fatima College of Physical Therapy, Fatima College of Pharmacy, Fatima College of Hotel and Restaurant Management, Fatima College of Nursing and Fatima College of Dental Medicine programs are accredited by the Philippine Association of and Universities Commission on Accreditation (PACUCOA).

== Fatima University Medical Center ==
Near the college of medicine is the Fatima University Medical Center, a 150-bed hospital on the university campus. The center is an institutional partner that serves as a teaching tertiary hospital.

== Athletics ==
The 'Fatima Phoenix' commonly called Team Fatima are chosen athletes who compete in basketball, volleyball, badminton, taekwondo, cheerdancing, track and field, chess, billiards, and swimming. Their students represent the university in NAASCU, PRISAA and other competitions.
