= Perpetual Altas, Lady Altas and Junior Altas =

College sports team in the Philippines

Perpetual Altas and Lady Altas
- School: University of Perpetual Help System DALTA
- Joined: 1984
- Location: Alabang-Zapote Road, Las Piñas
- Team colors: Maroon and Gold; White as a tertiary color
- Women's team: Lady Altas
- Juniors' team: Junior Altas

Seniors' general championships
- NCAA: 2 (1995–96, 1996–97)

Juniors' general championships
- NCAA: 1 (2018–2019)

The Perpetual Altas and Lady Altas, or the UPHSD Altas and Lady Altas, are the National Collegiate Athletic Association (Philippines) teams of the University of Perpetual Help System DALTA. They are also popularly known as the Perps.

Since joining the NCAA in 1984, the university's senior varsity basketball team only made the NCAA Finals twice. In spite of the poor financial support, their biggest run was in the late 1980s, led by the "big three" Bong Hawkins, Eric Quiday, and Ronald Sy, against the SSCR Stags' "big three", Paul Alvarez, Eugene Quilban, and Nap Hatton. They are the only NCAA basketball team that joined in the 20th century that's still in the NCAA to have never won a men's basketball championship.

The Altas have been successful in other sports, winning titles in volleyball and in the NCAA Cheerleading Competition.

The university's juniors' team are called the UPHSD Junior Altas (formerly the "Altalettes").

== Name ==
The moniker 'Altas' comes from the Latin word "height," symbolizing UPHSD's aspirations for further greatness. At the same time, it comes from the initials of the school founder, Antonio L. Tamayo.

== Basketball ==
Juniors' basketball roster

Perpetual Junior Altas roster
Players
Coaches

Pos.	No.	Nat.	Name	Height	Year	High School
CG	2	(Philippines)	Belan, John	5'10" (1.78m)	–	–
G	2	(Philippines)	Acain, Mathew	–	–	–
PG	3	(Philippines)	Barinque, Kin	5'7" (1.7m)	–	–
G	5	(Philippines)	Garing, Kyle	5'7" (1.7m)	–	–
PG	6	(Philippines)	Trinos, Kyle	–	–	–
F	8	(Philippines)	Ferriols, Hugo	6'2" (1.88m)	–	–
G	9	(Philippines)	Mabbayad, Mathaniel	–	–	–
G	10	(Philippines)	Langit, Derrek	–	–	–
G	11	(Philippines)	Cabantac, Angelo	–	–	–
F	13	(Philippines)	Lugo, Angelo	6'3" (1.91m)	–	–
F	15	(Philippines)	Tan, Prince	–	–	–
G	16	(Philippines)	Pillas, Laurence (C)	5'11" (1.8m)	–	–
G	19	(Philippines)	Sapo, Jermaine	6'0" (1.83m)	–	–
C	22	(Philippines)	Teoc, Tristan	–	–	–
F	28	(Philippines)	Dalaten, Zaqueo	6'1" (1.85m)	–	–
G	31	(Philippines)	Angeles, Thadeus	5'4" (1.63m)	–	–
PG	33	(Philippines)	Garan, Ronie	–	–	–
C	47	(Philippines)	Asay, Ian	6'4" (1.93m)	–	–

Head coach

- Vacant

Legend

- (C) Team captain
- Injured

UPHSD Junior Altas
No.	Name	Position
2	BELAN, John	PG/SG
3	OKEOWO, Daniel	SF
5	ZAMORAS, Ezekiel	PG/SG
7	URDANETA, Vandolf	PG
8	ROSALES, Don (C)	SG
9	ROQUID, Sizco	G
10	PATALINGHUG, Kurt	PG
15	TAN, Gabe	-
17	MADAYA, Raymark	SG
20	CRISTOBAL, Arkin	PF
27	SABUCO, Keith	-
28	ORCA, Brian	SF
37	DULANAS, Lord	SF
44	SAGA, Josh	PG
45	RESTIFICAR, John	PF
71	ROSALES, Francis	SG
77	MAURICE, Max	-
88	VILLARUEL, Sam	PF

== Volleyball ==
Women's volleyball

Men's volleyball roster
V-league Crib Selection

UPHSD Altas
No.	Name	Position
1	TEODORO, Arianne Paul.	Libero
9	CODENIERA Sean Archer Noel.	OP/Setter
3	ENGAY, Renz.	OH
4	ZARENO, Joshua.	OH
5	ROSETE, STEFFANO MAURO	MB

== Notable alumni ==
=== Basketball ===
Seniors 1988–present

- Ben Adamos (PBA - NorthPort Batang Pier, Barangay Ginebra San Miguel)
- Bright Akhuetie
- Harold Arboleda (PBA - NLEX Road Warriors; MPBL - Parañaque Patriots, Zamboanga Family's Brand Sardines, Tabogon Voyagers, Cagayan Valley Golden Eagles, Muntinlupa Cagers, Bacolod City of Smiles)
- Kim Aurin (PBA - TNT Tropang Giga)
- Juneric Baloria - (PBA - NLEX Road Warriors, Mahindra Floodbuster, Blackwater Bossing; MPBL - Parañaque Patriots, Pampanga Lanterns, Makati Super Crunch, Basilan Peace Riders, Batangas City Embassy Chill/Tanduay Rum Masters)
- Arnel Bravo (played in the PBL - RC Cola, Serg's, Otto Shoes, Zest-O, Paralux)
- Jonathan Engracia (played in PBL - Welcoat)
- Gerry Guarda (played in the PBL - Burger Machine)
- Rene "Bong" Hawkins Jr. (played in the PBA - Presto Tivola, Sta. Lucia Realtors, Alaska Aces, Tanduay Rhum Masters, Coca-Cola Tigers)
- Kyt Jimenez (played in MPBL - Sarangani Marlins; PBA - San Miguel Beermen)
- June Longalong (played in the PBL, MBA & PBA - Talk 'N Text)
- Jojo Manalo (played in PBL - Welcoat; PBA - Coca-Cola & Talk 'N Text)
- Eric Quiday (1989 NCAA MVP, played in the PBL-Crispa, Magnolia; PBA - Shell)
- Roderick Ramirez (played in the PBL - Springmaid)
- Jomer Rubi (PH Team '95, '97; PBL - Stag/Tanduay; PBA - Tanduay)
- Ronald Sy (played in the PBL - Burger City)
- Scottie Thompson (PBA - Barangay Ginebra San Miguel)
- Chester Tolomia (PBA - Barangay Ginebra Kings, Sta. Lucia Realtors, Magnolia Beverage Masters)
- Romy Viado (played in the PBL - Agfa colors)

== See also ==
- San Beda-Perpetual rivalry
