= NCAA Season 99 volleyball tournaments =

Volleyball tournament

NCAA Season 99
- New Heroes of the Game
- Host school: University of Perpetual Help System DALTA (Collegiate); Arellano University (High school)
Men's Finals	G1	G2	Wins
Perpetual Altas	3	3	2
EAC Generals	1	0	0
- Duration: May 19–26, 2024
- Arena(s): Filoil EcoOil Centre
- Finals MVP: Jefferson Marapoc
- Winning coach: Sammy Acaylar
- Semifinalists: Letran Knights (bronze); Arellano Chiefs
- TV network(s): GTV
Women's Finals	G1	G2	Wins
Benilde Lady Blazers	3	3	2
Letran Lady Knights	0	0	0
- Duration: May 19–26, 2024
- Arena(s): Filoil EcoOil Centre
- Finals MVP: Jhasmine Gayle Pascual
- Winning coach: Jerry Yee
- Semifinalists: Lyceum Lady Pirates (bronze); Arellano Lady Chiefs
- TV network(s): GTV
Boys' Finals	G1	G2	Wins
Arellano Braves	0	0	0
Malayan Junior Spikers	3	3	2
- Duration: May 12–15, 2024
- Arena(s): Filoil EcoOil Centre
- Finals MVP: Charles Jordan Segui
- Winning coach: Ralph Ocampo
- Semifinalists: Perpetual Junior Altas (bronze); Lyceum Junior Pirates
Girls' Finals	G1	G2	Wins
Arellano Lady Braves	2	2	0
Perpetual Junior Lady Altas	3	3	2
- Duration: May 12–15, 2024
- Arena(s): Filoil EcoOil Centre
- Finals MVP: Jemalyn Menor
- Winning coach: Jason Sapin
- Semifinalists: EAC–ICA Lady Brigadiers (bronze); Lyceum Junior Lady Pirates

The NCAA Season 99 volleyball tournaments are the volleyball tournaments of the National Collegiate Athletic Association (Philippines) for its 2023–24 season. University of Perpetual Help System DALTA is hosting the tournament for the men's and women's division, and Arellano University is hosting the tournament for the boys' and girls division.

The seniors' tournament began on April 7, 2024.

The high school boys' and girls' tournaments began on April 8, 2024.

== Teams ==
All ten schools are participating.

Collegiate division
University	Men		Women	
University	Team	Coach	Team	Coach
Arellano University (AU)	Arellano Chiefs	Sherwin Meneses and Carl Bryan Vitug	Arellano Lady Chiefs	Roberto Javier
Colegio de San Juan de Letran (CSJL)	Letran Knights	Brian Esquibel	Letran Lady Knights	Oliver Almadro
De La Salle–College of Saint Benilde (CSB)	Benilde Blazers	Arnold Laniog	Benilde Lady Blazers	Jerry Yee
Emilio Aguinaldo College (EAC)	EAC Generals	Rodrigo Palmero	EAC Lady Generals	Rodrigo Palmero
José Rizal University (JRU)	JRU Heavy Bombers	Larry Sioco Jr.	JRU Lady Bombers	Mia Tioseco
Lyceum of the Philippines University (LPU)	Lyceum Pirates	Paul Jan Dolorias	Lyceum Lady Pirates	Cromwel Garcia
Mapúa University (MU)	Mapúa Cardinals	Clarence Esteban	Mapúa Lady Cardinals	Clarence Esteban
San Beda University (SBU)	San Beda Red Spikers	Ariel Dela Cruz	San Beda Lady Red Spikers	Edgar Barroga
San Sebastian College – Recoletos (SSC–R)	San Sebastian Stags	Boyet Delmoro	San Sebastian Lady Stags	Roger Gorayeb
University of Perpetual Help System DALTA (UPHSD)	Perpetual Altas	Sammy Acaylar	Perpetual Lady Altas	Sandy Rieta

High School division
High school	Boys' team	Girls' team
Arellano University High School (AU)	Arellano Braves	Arellano Lady Braves
Colegio de San Juan de Letran (CSJL)	Letran Squires	—N/a
Immaculate Conception Academy (ICA)	EAC-ICA Brigadiers	EAC-ICA Lady Brigadiers
José Rizal University (JRU)	JRU Light Bombers	JRU Light Lady Bombers
La Salle Green Hills (LSGH)	La Salle Green Hills Greenies	La Salle Lady Greenies
Lyceum of the Philippines University – Cavite (LPU–C)	Lyceum Junior Pirates	Lyceum Junior Lady Pirates
Malayan High School of Science (MHSS)	Malayan Junior Spikers	—N/a
San Beda University – Rizal (SBU–R)	San Beda Junior Red Spikers	—N/a
University of Perpetual Help System DALTA (UPHSD)	Perpetual Junior Altas	Perpetual Junior Lady Altas

== Men's tournament ==
=== Team line-up ===
Arellano Chiefs
No.	Name	Position
1	Agovida, Daniel Adonai	OP
2	Bustillo, Melchor	L
3	Salvo, Laurence Andrei	OH
4	Teves, Jake Henry	S
6	Curamen, Anfernee	OH
8	Del Rosario, Clarence	MB
9	Delos Santos, James Paul	OP
11	Guinto, Arman Clarence	S
12	Pangailinan, Jake	MB
14	Sinuto, John Will	OP
15	Sinuto, Jiwen	MB
17	Villados, Adrian (c)	OP
18	Datu, Joshua	L
19	Orpilla, Exequel	OH
	Sherwin Meneses	HC

Letran Knights
No.	Name	Position
1	Himzon, Vince Virrey	MB
2	Bautista, John Derrick	OH
3	Sta.Maria, Steven	OP
4	Araño, John Wayne	S
5	Corderoc, Luke Redd	OP
9	Bangcola, Abdul Hafiz	S
11	Wingco, Keith Nolan	MB
12	Lorenzo, John Paulo	OP
13	Molacruz, Vhan Marco	L
14	Caballero, Namron Ellehcar	MB
16	Ambrosio, Christer	OH
17	Santiagudo, John Francis Jero	MB
19	Catris, Raxel Redd (c)	L
21	Domolant, Dennis	MB
	Brian Esquibel	HC

Benilde Blazers
No.	Name	Position
1	Fajardo, Cholo	S
4	Marasigan, James Paul	OH
5	Villanueva, Chris	S
6	Valera, Reiven	OH
7	Reolalas, Joseph	OP
8	Jaboli, Leonard	OH
10	Herrera, Jacob	OP
11	Sulaiman, Alvin	OH
12	Balbacal, Mike	MB
13	Tero, Carlo	MB
14	Manalo, Niel	MB
15	Aguilar, Christian	OH
16	Gomez, Bryle (c)	L
17	Cuenca, Jeremi	L
18	Austero, Adrianne	MB
	Arnold Laniog	HC

EAC Generals
No.	Name	Position
1	Olivo, Joshua	MB
3	Osabel, Ervin Patrick	OP
4	Gura, Paul Deward	OH
5	Paglano, John Michael	OP
7	Cabrera, Bryan Jay	OP
8	Diones, Bhim Lawrence (c)	L
9	Salonga, Jerimaih	MB
10	Santos, Mark Joseph	L
12	Saria, Dearborn	S
14	Abor, Jan Ruther	OP
15	Batiancila, Kenneth	MB
16	Romeo, Marvin Williams	OH
17	Taculog, Frelwin	OH
18	De Leon, Rogelio lll	OH
20	Say, Paul Justin	OH
	Rodrigo Palmero	HC

JRU Heavy Bombers
No.	Name	Position
1	Alipan Bryle	OH
2	Dasis, Kaluse Alice	S
3	Carbon, Aristotle Jose	L
5	Guazon, Maki	OH
6	Daynata, Kenneth	OP
7	Dela Cruz, Charlie Jade	OH
8	Devero, Charlvie	MB
9	Dilag, Resoldo Jr	L
11	Fernandez, Jake Johnson (c)	OH
13	Laurenciana Windel	OP
14	Miguel, Matthew	OH
15	Quilban, Reggie John	MB
16	Sual, Dhen Henry	OP
17	Tapco, Asea Anthony	S
18	Zapico Neil Yvonne Nagor	MB
	Larry Sioco Jr.	HC

Lyceum Pirates
No.	Name	Position
1	Edang, Gian Carlo	OP
2	Aquino, John Icon	OH
3	Inting, Phil Nikirich	L
4	Bago, Frtizvan Theo	MB
5	Velasco, Josue lll	OH
6	Palad, Jansen	OP
7	Edang, Jun Frank (c)	OH
8	Bencito, Sean Lewis	OP
10	Polis, Eral Jericsson	MB
13	Ranara, Vic Justin	S
14	Veronilla, Kent	MB
16	Abartique, Rheymiel	L
19	Dumasig, Chris John Louie	S
20	Asunio, Gabriel	OP
	Paul Jan Dolorias	HC

Mapúa Cardinals
No.	Name	Position
1	Barba, Juancho Joaquin	MB
2	Jamisola, Saint Marlowe	OH
3	Santos, Jeremy	OP
4	Florendo, Aizran Zaniel	L
5	Musni, Adrian Patrick	OH
6	Topacio, Kalvyn Aldrke	MB
7	Ramos, Ar-Jay	OH
9	Bawiga, Jan Zigfred	S
11	Yap, Joseph Evan	OH
12	Caballero, Marc Joshua	L
13	San Andres, John Benedict (c)	OH
14	Gripo Jr, Ramil	S
15	Eslapor, Kenneth	OH
16	Lastimosa, Karl Christian	OH
18	Macadangdang, Alvin	OP
	Clarence Esteban	HC

San Beda Red Spikers
No.	Name	Position
1	Baki, Anrie	L
2	Book, Axel Van	OH
3	Cabalsa, Ralph	OP
6	Bakil, Andrei	MB
7	Munsing, Grek Alener	MB
9	Miljani, Alsenal	OH
10	Diaz, Kurt Lee	MB
13	Montemayor, Kevin	OP
14	Rus, Aidjien Josh (c)	L
16	Tahiluddint, Mohammad Shaif Ali	OH
18	Rosman, Ryan	OH
20	Cañal, Rafael	S
23	Tolentino, Arnel	OP
24	Sarol, Venchie	MB
	Ariel Dela Cruz	HC

San Sebastian Stags
No.	Name	Position
2	Alba, Rhenmart Christian	MB
3	Araño, Jan Kerk	OP
4	Baluyot, Carl Hendry	L
5	Binondo, Frants Einstene Aaron (c)	MB
6	Buenaventura, Ace	S
7	Duguen, Jilbert	MB
8	Espenida, Joshua	OH
9	Leal, Lorenzo Miguel	S
10	Lim, Cedric Resty	OP
11	Marcos, Jezreel Franz	OH
12	Suga, Reniel	OP
16	Villamor, Kyle Angelo	S
19	Yape, Theann Andrei	L
	Boyet Delmoro	HC

Perpetual Altas
No.	Name	Position
1	Mateo, Klint Michael	OP
2	Marapoc, Jefferson	OH
3	Pascua, James Niño	OH
4	Teodoro, Arianne Paul	L
5	Medalla, Michael	MB
6	Ancrade, KC	MB
9	Codeniera, Sean Archer	OP
11	Enarciso, John Christian (c)	S
12	Lituania, John Exequiel	S
14	Ramirez, Louie	OH
15	Arrozado, Dexter	OP
16	Rosos, Kirth Patrick	MB
17	Castil, John	MB
18	Pepito, John Philip	L
19	Tabuga, Kobe Brian	OH
	Sammy Acaylar	HC

=== Elimination round ===
==== Team standings ====
Pos	Team	Pld	W	L	Pts	SW	SL	SR	SPW	SPL	SPR	Qualification
1	Perpetual Altas (H)	9	9	0	26	27	3	9.000	734	580	1.266	Advance to the Finals (Note: As Perpetual won all of their elimination round games, the stepladder format will be used instead of the regular Final Four format.)
2	EAC Generals	9	8	1	22	24	10	2.400	802	713	1.125	Proceed to stepladder round 2
3	Letran Knights	9	6	3	16	20	16	1.250	840	790	1.063	Proceed to stepladder round 1
4	Arellano Chiefs	9	5	4	14	18	15	1.200	760	743	1.023	Proceed to stepladder round 1
5	Benilde Blazers	9	4	5	15	21	18	1.167	868	836	1.038	
6	San Beda Red Spikers	9	4	5	12	18	21	0.857	844	855	0.987	
7	San Sebastian Stags	9	4	5	11	15	21	0.714	774	815	0.950	
8	Mapúa Cardinals	9	3	6	12	18	21	0.857	819	867	0.945	
9	JRU Heavy Bombers	9	2	7	6	10	23	0.435	687	761	0.903	
10	Lyceum Pirates	9	0	9	1	4	27	0.148	586	754	0.777	

Rules for classification: 1) Number of wins; 2) match points; 3) sets ratio; 4) points ratio; 5) head-to-head record
(H) Host
Notes:

Point system:

3 points = win match in 3 or 4 sets
2 points = win match in 5 sets
1 point = lose match in 5 sets
0 point = lose match in 3 or 4 sets

==== Match-up results ====
Team ╲ Game	1	2	3	4	5	6	7	8	9
Arellano	Letran school colors	Mapua school colors	Lyceum school colors	San Beda school colors	SSC-R school colors	CSB school colors	UPHD school colors	EAC school colors	JRU school colors
Letran	Arellano school colors	UPHD school colors	EAC school colors	JRU school colors	CSB school colors	Mapua school colors	Lyceum school colors	San Beda school colors	SSC-R school colors
Benilde	EAC school colors	San Beda school colors	JRU school colors	SSC-R school colors	Letran school colors	Arellano school colors	Mapua school colors	UPHD school colors	Lyceum school colors
EAC	CSB school colors	JRU school colors	Letran school colors	Mapua school colors	Lyceum school colors	San Beda school colors	SSC-R school colors	Arellano school colors	UPHD school colors
JRU	UPHD school colors	EAC school colors	CSB school colors	Letran school colors	Mapua school colors	Lyceum school colors	San Beda school colors	SSC-R school colors	Arellano school colors
Lyceum	San Beda school colors	SSC-R school colors	Arellano school colors	UPHD school colors	EAC school colors	JRU school colors	Letran school colors	Mapua school colors	CSB school colors
Mapúa	SSC-R school colors	Arellano school colors	UPHD school colors	EAC school colors	JRU school colors	Letran school colors	CSB school colors	Lyceum school colors	San Beda school colors
San Beda	Lyceum school colors	CSB school colors	SSC-R school colors	Arellano school colors	UPHD school colors	EAC school colors	JRU school colors	Letran school colors	Mapua school colors
San Sebastian	Mapua school colors	Lyceum school colors	San Beda school colors	CSB school colors	Arellano school colors	UPHD school colors	EAC school colors	JRU school colors	Letran school colors
Perpetual	JRU school colors	Letran school colors	Mapua school colors	Lyceum school colors	San Beda school colors	SSC-R school colors	Arellano school colors	CSB school colors	EAC school colors

= Win; = Loss

==== Scores ====
Teams	AU	CSJL	CSB	EAC	JRU	LPU	MU	SBU	SSC–R	UPHSD
Arellano Chiefs		1–3	1–3	1–3	3–1	3–0	3–0	3–2	3–0	0–3
Letran Knights			3–2	1–3	3–0	3–1	1–3	3–1	3–2	0–3
Benilde Blazers				2–3	3–0	3–0	3–2	1–3	2–3	2–3
EAC Generals					3–0	3–0	3–2	3–1	3–0	0–3
JRU Heavy Bombers						3–0	2–3	3–2	1–3	0–3
Lyceum Pirates							0–3	2–3	1–3	0–3
Mapúa Cardinals								2–3	2–3	1–3
San Beda Red Spikers									3–1	0–3
San Sebastian Stags										0–3
Perpetual Altas										

Legend: Blue = left column team win; Red = top row team win.

=== Bracket ===
Stepladder round 1 (Single elimination)
3	Letran	3
4	Arellano	1

Stepladder round 2 (Single elimination)
2	EAC	3
3	Letran	1

Finals (Best-of-three series)
1	Perpetual	3	3
2	EAC	1	0

=== Stepladder semifinals ===
As Perpetual won all elimination round games, the stepladder format shall be used. The first two rounds are straight knockout games.

==== First round ====
May 12, 2024; 2:30 p.m.	Letran Knights	3–1	Arellano Chiefs	Filoil EcoOil Centre, San Juan; Attendance: 300; Referees: Erwin Lou Cordero (NR) & Jastin Cruz (NR)
May 12, 2024; 2:30 p.m.	(18–25, 25–23, 25–23, 25–22)			Filoil EcoOil Centre, San Juan; Attendance: 300; Referees: Erwin Lou Cordero (NR) & Jastin Cruz (NR)
May 12, 2024; 2:30 p.m.	Letran advances to the second round			Filoil EcoOil Centre, San Juan; Attendance: 300; Referees: Erwin Lou Cordero (NR) & Jastin Cruz (NR)

==== Second round ====
May 15, 2024; 10:30 a.m.	EAC Generals	3–1	Letran Knights	Filoil EcoOil Centre, San Juan; Attendance: 500; Referees: Antonio Espartero (NR) & Ely de Jesus (NR)
May 15, 2024; 10:30 a.m.	(30–28, 25–15, 19–25, 28–26)			Filoil EcoOil Centre, San Juan; Attendance: 500; Referees: Antonio Espartero (NR) & Ely de Jesus (NR)
May 15, 2024; 10:30 a.m.	EAC advances to the finals			Filoil EcoOil Centre, San Juan; Attendance: 500; Referees: Antonio Espartero (NR) & Ely de Jesus (NR)

=== Finals ===
The finals is a best-of-three playoff.

Perpetual qualified to its second consecutive Finals by winning all of its elimination round games.

May 19, 2024; 12:00 p.m.	Perpetual Altas	3–1	EAC Generals	Filoil EcoOil Centre, San Juan; Attendance: 3,500; Referees: Rolando Casillan (NR) and Spinks Cabusa (NR)
May 19, 2024; 12:00 p.m.	(24–26, 25–20, 27–25, 25–19)			Filoil EcoOil Centre, San Juan; Attendance: 3,500; Referees: Rolando Casillan (NR) and Spinks Cabusa (NR)

May 26, 2024; 12:00 p.m.	Perpetual Altas	3–0	EAC Generals	Filoil EcoOil Centre, San Juan; Attendance: 3,500; Referees: Erwin Lou Cordero (NR) and Rolando Casillan (NR)
May 26, 2024; 12:00 p.m.	(25–14, 25–22, 29–27)			Filoil EcoOil Centre, San Juan; Attendance: 3,500; Referees: Erwin Lou Cordero (NR) and Rolando Casillan (NR)
May 26, 2024; 12:00 p.m.	Perpetual wins series, 2–0			Filoil EcoOil Centre, San Juan; Attendance: 3,500; Referees: Erwin Lou Cordero (NR) and Rolando Casillan (NR)

- Finals MVP: Jefferson Marapoc (Perpetual Altas)
- Coach of the Year: Sammy Acaylar (Perpetual Altas)

=== Awards ===
NCAA Season 99 men's volleyball champions
Perpetual Altas
14th title, fourth consecutive title

- Most Valuable Player: Louie Ramirez (Perpetual Altas)
- Rookie of the Year: Axel van Book (San Beda Red Lions)
- Freshman of the Year: Jun Edang (Lyceum Pirates)
- 1st best outside spiker: Axel van Book (San Beda Red Lions)
  - 2nd best outside spiker: Louie Ramirez (Perpetual Altas)
- 1st best middle blocker: Vince Himzon (Letran Knights)
  - 2nd best middle blocker: KC Andrade (Perpetual Altas)
- Best opposite spiker: Jan Ruther Abor (EAC Generals)
- Best setter: Adrian Villados (Arellano Chiefs)
- Best libero: Bhim Diones (EAC Generals)

==== Players of the Week ====
The Collegiate Press Corps awards a "player of the week" on Mondays for performances on the preceding week.

Week	Player	Team	Ref.
Week 1	Van Book	San Beda Red Spikers	
Week 2	Jiwen Sinuto	Arellano Chiefs	
Week 3	Louie Ramirez	Perpetual Altas	
Week 4	Louie Ramirez	Perpetual Altas	
Week 5	AC Guinto	Arellano Chiefs	

== Women's tournament ==
=== Teams line-up ===
Arellano Lady Chiefs
No.	Name	Position
1	ADANTE, Kristine Claire	S
2	DIÑO, Charmina	OH
4	VILLAFLORES, Heart	OP
5	PABLO, Khey Aleck	L
6	PADILLON, Marianne Lei Angelique	MB
7	TUDLASAN, Laika	OH
8	CAGUICAL, Alona Nicole	L
9	MAGALING, Mauie Joice	OP
10	PARALEJAS, Donnalyn Mae	S
11	BATINDAAN, Dodee Risa Joy (c)	MB
12	CEBALLOS, Harem	OH
13	MANGUBAT, Fhaye	MB
14	DE GUZMAN, Pauline	OP
17	PECAÑA, Lorraine	MB
19	MATAWARAN, Robbie Mae	OH
	Roberto Javier	HC

Letran Lady Knights
No.	Name	Position
1	NITURA, Marie Judiel	OH
3	DELA CRUZ, Royce	MB
4	CALIXTO, Cristine Kate	OH
5	ALMIRANTE, Keiara Marie	OP
6	LEDESMA, Angelique	MB
7	MARTIN, Nizelle Aeriyen	OH
10	ESTRELLER, Natalie Marie	S
15	RELUCIO, Andre Roshe	L
16	ISAR, Lastlie Jade	MB
17	TAPANG, Lea Rizel	OH
19	SILVA, Lara Mae (c)	L
21	MAQUILANG, Jogi	S
22	YAP, Aziejay Andrea	OP
25	MAQUILANG, Gia Marcel	OH
2	CASTRO, Julienne Rose (r)	OH
18	MELENDRES, Daisy (r)	
	Oliver Almadro	HC

Benilde Lady Blazers
No.	Name	Position
1	BASARTE, Chenae	S
3	GAMIT, Michelle	MB
4	ESTENZO, Kim Alison	L
5	GETIGAN, Fiona Marie	L
7	GENTAPA, Jade	OH
8	MONDOÑEDO, Cloanne Sophia	S
9	PASCUAL, Jhasmine Gayle	OP
10	GO, Mycah	S
12	APOSTOL, Corrine Allyson	OH
14	ESTOQUE, Wielyn	OH
16	CATARIG, Clydel Mae	OP
17	DOROG, Jessa (c)	OH
18	ONDANGAN, Cristy	OP
21	NOLASCO, Zamantha	MB
11	BADION, Sophia Margarette (r)	
15	INOCENTES, Fiona Marie (r)	
	Jerry Yee	HC

EAC Lady Generals
No.	Name	Position
1	OMAPAS, Jennifer	OP
2	ORENDAIN, Freddie Lyn	OH
3	GALLARDEZ, Dhariane Andreane	MB
4	MAGALONA, Rhea	L
5	VILLENA, Jamaica	OP
6	DE ANDRES, Karyle	MB
7	REYES, Krizzia	S
9	SAYAGO, Jade Nicole	OH
10	CORDIAL, Christine Joy	OP
11	BRUTAS, Tristh Jay	MB
12	FORMENTO, Anne Jelyn	S
13	ALMAZAN, Cathrine (c)	OH
16	LUT, Georgeena	OP
17	RAZONABLE, Alessandra Julienne	OH
18	MORTEL, Trisha Mae	L
	Rodrigo Palmero	HC

JRU Lady Bombers
No.	Name	Position
1	SILVERIO, Genelyn	MB
2	AMANTE, Malley	OP
3	JAZARENO, Karyla Rafaela	OH
4	EGERA Jonazel Lyka	OH
5	ALOÑA, Marianne	L
7	BATARY, Khreiszantha Gayle	OP
8	DEALA, Nicole Grace	MB
10	LAURENTE, Jerry Lyn	S
11	RUIZ, Mary May (c)	OH
12	LALONGISIP Ma Rachel Ann	L
14	ROSARIO, Syzzle Louise	MB
15	DAYAME, Cherish	S
16	PRETTA, Shanine	OP
17	DEL PILAR, Patricia Ann	OP
19	BAUTISTA, Angel Rose	OH
	Mia Tioseco	HC

Lyceum Lady Pirates
No.	Name	Position
1	DE GUZMAN, Joann Faeith	OH
2	GUZMAN, Angelica Blue	L
3	MARTIN, Vanessa Yvonne	MB
5	LOPEZ, Ma. Light Jericha	OH
6	TULANG, Janeth	OP
7	RIVAS, Marcela Angela	L
8	LOPEZ, Stacey Denise	OH
9	TOPACIO, Lean Isabelle	OH
10	PUZON, Venice (c)	S
11	GALEDO, Kareina Paula	S
12	DOGUNA, Joan	OH
15	DOLORITO, Johna Denise	OH
16	OSADA, Hiromi	OP
18	PEREZ, Anamae	OH
19	BIO, Heart	MB
	Cromwel Garcia	HC

Mapúa Lady Cardinals
No.	Name	Position
1	GACULA, Freebie Alejandra	L
2	RICABLANCA, Raisa Janel	OH
3	MANALO, Therese Angeli (c)	MB
4	GARCIA, Freighanne	OH
5	MARCOS, Clarence	MB
6	REBUSTES, Princess	L
7	BARBIERA, Princess Jolina	MB
8	GOJOL, Trixie Mae	S
9	DELA CRUZ, Roxie	OH
11	ONG, Alyanna Nicole	MB
12	TAMBASACAN, MA. Theresa	OH
14	ESTEBAN, Franchesca Clariss	OP
15	MACATANGAY, Frances Isabel	OH
16	BERCES, Nadine Angeli	OH
17	MANARANG, Princess Jeline	S
18	DE GUZMAN, Hannah	OP
	Clarence Esteban	HC

San Beda Lady Red Spikers
No.	Name	Position
1	HABACON, Angel	OH
2	ARIZPA, Lalaine	OP
3	BACHAR, Janelle	MB
5	CASTILLO, Chynna Allyson	OH
6	CASUGOD, Jaschryl	S
7	HADLOCON, Rea Mae (c)	OP
8	ABRAHAM, Kleiner Ross	OH
9	ESPINA, Gina	L
10	CAGALAWAN, Michela Sophie	OH
11	TAYAG, Maxinne Joyce	MB
12	BAÑAS, Gwen	OP
14	BIONG, Amber Lily	L
15	FLORES, Milchah	MB
16	NAVARRO, Erin Feliz	MB
18	MOLINA, Katleya Jewel	OH
19	DELA CRUZ, Jayde Margareta	S
	Edgar Barroga	HC

San Sebastian Lady Stags
No.	Name	Position
1	SANTOS, Katherine	OH
2	DIONISIO, Kristine Joy	OH
3	PASCO, Lei Lance	OH
4	MARASIGAN, Christina	OH
5	ADIA, Mary Anne Margarette	S
6	LUMIBAO, Jassy Lei	MB
7	DOMINGO, Jasmyn	L
8	MARTINEZ, Brigette Anne	OP
9	LAZARTE, Chloi Florenci	L
10	TAN, Kamille Jospehine Amacka (c)	MB
11	DEPOSOY, Zenith Joy	OH
12	GONZALES, Juna May	MB
13	DIMACULANGAN, Von Aleina	S
	Roger Gorayeb	HC

Perpetual Lady Altas
No.	Name	Position
1	DAPOL, Mary Rhose	OH
2	UY, Daizerlyn Joice	MB
3	BEDANA, Winnie	MB
4	OMIPON, Shaila Allaine	OH
5	BUSTAMANTE, Camille	OH
6	ARIOLA, Frannie Istle	S
7	MINDANAO, Mikayla	MB
8	ALEMENIANA, Cryrille Jole	OH
9	OCADO, Charmaine Mae	OH
10	CORDERO, Krisha	OH
12	ANDAL, Marian Tracy	L
13	ENRICO, Charisse Mae (c)	OP
15	ALDEA, Razel Paula	MB
16	SAPIN, Jhasmine	S
17	LOZANO, Joanna Denise	L
	Sandy Rieta	HC

=== Elimination round ===
==== Team standings ====
Pos	Team	Pld	W	L	Pts	SW	SL	SR	SPW	SPL	SPR	Qualification
1	Benilde Lady Blazers	9	9	0	26	27	3	9.000	729	511	1.427	Advance to the Finals (Note: As Benilde won all of their elimination round games, the stepladder format will be used instead of the regular Final Four format.)
2	Letran Lady Knights	9	7	2	19	22	13	1.692	814	746	1.091	Proceed to stepladder round 2
3	Lyceum Lady Pirates	9	6	3	19	23	15	1.533	846	790	1.071	Proceed to stepladder round 1
4	Arellano Lady Chiefs	9	6	3	17	20	13	1.538	738	703	1.050	Proceed to stepladder round 1
5	Mapúa Lady Cardinals	9	6	3	17	19	13	1.462	739	698	1.059	
6	Perpetual Lady Altas (H)	9	5	4	15	18	16	1.125	737	721	1.022	
7	San Beda Lady Red Spikers	9	3	6	9	15	22	0.682	755	799	0.945	
8	San Sebastian Lady Stags	9	2	7	9	14	23	0.609	767	849	0.903	
9	JRU Lady Bombers	9	1	8	4	6	24	0.250	558	715	0.780	
10	EAC Lady Generals	9	0	9	0	5	27	0.185	626	778	0.805	

Rules for classification: 1) Number of wins; 2) match points; 3) sets ratio; 4) points ratio; 5) head-to-head record
(H) Host
Notes:

Point system:

3 points = win match in 3 or 4 sets
2 points = win match in 5 sets
1 point = lose match in 5 sets
0 point = lose match in 3 or 4 sets

==== Match-up results ====
Team ╲ Game	1	2	3	4	5	6	7	8	9
Arellano	Letran school colors	Mapua school colors	Lyceum school colors	San Beda school colors	SSC-R school colors	CSB school colors	UPHD school colors	EAC school colors	JRU school colors
Letran	Arellano school colors	UPHD school colors	EAC school colors	JRU school colors	CSB school colors	Mapua school colors	Lyceum school colors	San Beda school colors	SSC-R school colors
Benilde	EAC school colors	San Beda school colors	JRU school colors	SSC-R school colors	Letran school colors	Arellano school colors	Mapua school colors	UPHD school colors	Lyceum school colors
EAC	CSB school colors	JRU school colors	Letran school colors	Mapua school colors	Lyceum school colors	San Beda school colors	SSC-R school colors	Arellano school colors	UPHD school colors
JRU	UPHD school colors	EAC school colors	CSB school colors	Letran school colors	Mapua school colors	Lyceum school colors	San Beda school colors	SSC-R school colors	Arellano school colors
Lyceum	San Beda school colors	SSC-R school colors	Arellano school colors	UPHD school colors	EAC school colors	JRU school colors	Letran school colors	Mapua school colors	CSB school colors
Mapúa	SSC-R school colors	Arellano school colors	UPHD school colors	EAC school colors	JRU school colors	Letran school colors	CSB school colors	Lyceum school colors	San Beda school colors
San Beda	Lyceum school colors	CSB school colors	SSC-R school colors	Arellano school colors	UPHD school colors	EAC school colors	JRU school colors	Letran school colors	Mapua school colors
San Sebastian	Mapua school colors	Lyceum school colors	San Beda school colors	CSB school colors	Arellano school colors	UPHD school colors	EAC school colors	JRU school colors	Letran school colors
Perpetual	JRU school colors	Letran school colors	Mapua school colors	Lyceum school colors	San Beda school colors	SSC-R school colors	Arellano school colors	CSB school colors	EAC school colors

= Win; = Loss; = Match cancelled

==== Scores ====
Teams	AU	CSJL	CSB	EAC	JRU	LPU	MU	SBU	SSC–R	UPHSD
Arellano Lady Chiefs		1–3	0–3	3–1	3–0	1–3	3–0	3–0	3–2	3–1
Letran Lady Knights			0–3	3–1	3–0	3–1	1–3	3–2	3–2	3–0
Benilde Lady Blazers				3–0	3–0	3–2	3–0	3–0	3–1	3–0
EAC Lady Generals					0–3	1–3	0–3	0–3	1–3	1–3
JRU Lady Bombers						0–3	0–3	2–3	1–3	0–3
Lyceum Lady Pirates							2–3	3–1	3–1	3–2
Mapúa Lady Cardinals								3–1	3–0	1–3
San Beda Lady Red Spikers									3–2	2–3
San Sebastian Lady Stags										0–3
Perpetual Lady Altas										

Legend: Blue = left column team win; Red = top row team win.

=== Bracket ===
Stepladder round 1 (Single elimination)
3	Lyceum	3
4	Arellano	1

Stepladder round 2 (Single elimination)
2	Letran	3
3	Lyceum	2

Finals (Best-of-three series)
1	Benilde	3	3
2	Letran	0	0

=== Stepladder semifinals ===
As Benilde won all elimination round games, the stepladder format shall be used. The first two rounds are straight knockout games.

==== First round ====
May 12, 2024; 12:00 p.m.	Lyceum Lady Pirates	3–1	Arellano Lady Chiefs	Filoil EcoOil Centre, San Juan; Attendance: 1,500; Referees: Ely de Jesus (NR) & Spinks Cabusa (NR)
May 12, 2024; 12:00 p.m.	(25–17, 24–26, 25–20, 25–19)			Filoil EcoOil Centre, San Juan; Attendance: 1,500; Referees: Ely de Jesus (NR) & Spinks Cabusa (NR)
May 12, 2024; 12:00 p.m.	Lyceum advances to the second round			Filoil EcoOil Centre, San Juan; Attendance: 1,500; Referees: Ely de Jesus (NR) & Spinks Cabusa (NR)

==== Second round ====
May 15, 2024; 2:30 p.m.	Letran Lady Knights	3–2	Lyceum Lady Pirates	Filoil EcoOil Centre, San Juan; Attendance: 1,510; Referees: Erwin Lou Cordero (NR) & Jastin Cruz (NR)
May 15, 2024; 2:30 p.m.	(25–15, 25–21, 19–25, 19–25, 15–11)			Filoil EcoOil Centre, San Juan; Attendance: 1,510; Referees: Erwin Lou Cordero (NR) & Jastin Cruz (NR)
May 15, 2024; 2:30 p.m.	Letran advances to the finals			Filoil EcoOil Centre, San Juan; Attendance: 1,510; Referees: Erwin Lou Cordero (NR) & Jastin Cruz (NR)

=== Finals ===
The finals is a best-of-three playoff.

Benilde qualified to its third consecutive Finals by winning all of its elimination round games.

May 19, 2024; 2:30 p.m.	Benilde Lady Blazers	3–0	Letran Lady Knights	Filoil EcoOil Centre, San Juan; Attendance: 1,500; Referees: Antonio Espartero (NR) & Ely de Jesus (NR)
May 19, 2024; 2:30 p.m.	(25–21, 25–15, 25–14)			Filoil EcoOil Centre, San Juan; Attendance: 1,500; Referees: Antonio Espartero (NR) & Ely de Jesus (NR)

May 26, 2024; 2:30 p.m.	Benilde Lady Blazers	3–0	Letran Lady Knights	Filoil EcoOil Centre, San Juan; Attendance: 2,000; Referees: Antonio Espartero (NR) & Jastin Cruz (NR)
May 26, 2024; 2:30 p.m.	(25–18, 25–17, 25–18)			Filoil EcoOil Centre, San Juan; Attendance: 2,000; Referees: Antonio Espartero (NR) & Jastin Cruz (NR)
May 26, 2024; 2:30 p.m.	Benilde wins series, 2–0			Filoil EcoOil Centre, San Juan; Attendance: 2,000; Referees: Antonio Espartero (NR) & Jastin Cruz (NR)

- Finals MVP: Jhasmin Gayle Pascual (Benilde Lady Blazers)
- Coach of the Year: Jerry Yee (Benilde Lady Blazers)

=== Awards ===
NCAA Season 99 women's volleyball champions
Benilde Lady Blazers
Fourth title, third consecutive title

- Most Valuable Player: Cloanne Sophia Mondoñedo (Benilde Lady Blazers)
- Rookie of the Year: Angel Mae Habacon (San Beda Red Lionesses)
- Freshman of the Year: Gia Marcel Maquilang (Letran Lady Knights)
- 1st best outside spiker: Angel Mae Habacon (San Beda Red Lionesses)
  - 2nd best outside spiker: Roxie Dela Cruz (Mapúa Lady Cardinals)
- 1st best middle blocker: Hiromi Osada (Lyceum Lady Pirates)
  - 2nd best middle blocker: Alyana Nicole Ong (Mapúa Lady Cardinals)
- Best opposite spiker: Janeth Tulang (Lyceum Lady Pirates)
- Best setter: Cloanne Sophia Mondoñedo (Benilde Lady Blazers)
- Best libero: Lara Mae Silva (Letran Lady Knights)

==== Players of the Week ====
The Collegiate Press Corps awards a "player of the week" on Mondays for performances on the preceding week.

Week	Player	Team	Ref.
Week 1	Gia Maquilang	Letran Lady Knights	
Week 2	Johna Dolorito	Lyceum Lady Pirates	
Week 3	Wielyn Estoque	Benilde Lady Blazers	
Week 4	Gia Maquilang	Letran Lady Knights	
Week 5	Lara Mae Silva	Letran Lady Knights	

== Boys' tournament ==
=== Elimination round ===
==== Team standings ====
Pos	Team	Pld	W	L	Pts	SW	SL	SR	SPW	SPL	SPR	Qualification
1	Arellano Braves (H)	8	7	1	21	13	3	4.333	450	369	1.220	Twice-to-beat in the semifinals
2	Perpetual Junior Altas	8	7	1	20	14	1	14.000	420	320	1.313	Twice-to-beat in the semifinals
3	Malayan Junior Spikers	8	6	2	20	14	4	3.500	434	372	1.167	Twice-to-win in the semifinals
4	Lyceum Junior Pirates	8	5	3	15	11	6	1.833	383	351	1.091	Twice-to-win in the semifinals
5	Letran Squires	8	5	3	14	19	8	2.375	387	356	1.087	
6	EAC–ICA Brigadiers	8	3	5	9	7	10	0.700	339	364	0.931	
7	San Beda Junior Red Spikers	8	2	6	6	4	12	0.333	317	377	0.841	
8	JRU Light Bombers	8	1	7	2	2	15	0.133	336	406	0.828	
9	La Salle Green Hills Greenies	8	0	8	1	1	16	0.063	263	420	0.626	

Rules for classification: 1) Number of wins; 2) match points; 3) sets ratio; 4) points ratio; 5) head-to-head record
(H) Host

==== Match-up results ====
Team ╲ Game	1	2	3	4	5	6	7	8
Arellano	Letran school colors	CSB school colors	San Beda school colors	Mapua school colors	UPHD school colors	Lyceum school colors	EAC school colors	JRU school colors
Letran	Arellano school colors	UPHD school colors	Lyceum school colors	EAC school colors	CSB school colors	JRU school colors	Mapua school colors	San Beda school colors
EAC–ICA	CSB school colors	JRU school colors	Mapua school colors	Letran school colors	UPHD school colors	San Beda school colors	Arellano school colors	Lyceum school colors
JRU	Lyceum school colors	EAC school colors	CSB school colors	Mapua school colors	Letran school colors	UPHD school colors	San Beda school colors	Arellano school colors
LSGH	EAC school colors	Arellano school colors	JRU school colors	Lyceum school colors	Letran school colors	San Beda school colors	Mapua school colors	UPHD school colors
LPU–Cavite	JRU school colors	Letran school colors	CSB school colors	San Beda school colors	Mapua school colors	Arellano school colors	UPHD school colors	EAC school colors
Malayan	UPHD school colors	San Beda school colors	EAC school colors	Arellano school colors	JRU school colors	Lyceum school colors	Letran school colors	CSB school colors
San Beda–Rizal	Mapua school colors	Arellano school colors	UPHD school colors	Lyceum school colors	EAC school colors	CSB school colors	JRU school colors	Letran school colors
Perpetual	Mapua school colors	Letran school colors	San Beda school colors	EAC school colors	Arellano school colors	JRU school colors	UPHD school colors	CSB school colors

= Win; = Loss; = Match cancelled

==== Scores ====
Teams	AU	CSJL	EAC–ICA	JRU	LSGH	LPU–C	MHSS	SBU–R	UPHSD
Arellano Braves		1–2	2–0	2–0	2–0	2–0	2–1	2–0	2–0
Letran Squires			2–0	2–0	2–0	0–2	0–2	2–0	0–2
EAC–ICA Brigadiers				2–0	2–0	2–0	0–2	2–0	0–2
JRU Light Bombers					2–1	0–2	0–2	0–2	0–2
La Salle Green Hills Greenies						0–2	0–2	0–2	0–2
Lyceum Junior Pirates							0–2	2–0	0–2
Malayan Junior Spikers								2–0	1–2
San Beda Junior Red Spikers									0–2
Perpetual Junior Altas									

Legend: Blue = left column team win; Red = top row team win.

=== Bracket ===
Semifinals (Nos. 1 & 2 have twice-to-beat advantage)
1	Arellano	3
4	Lyceum–Cavite	1
2	Perpetual	2	1
3	Malayan	3	3

Finals (Best-of-three series)
1	Arellano	0	0
3	Malayan	3	3
Third place playoff
4	Lyceum–Cavite	0
2	Perpetual	3

=== Semifinals ===
The top two seeds in the semifinals have the twice-to-beat advantage.

==== (1) Arellano vs. (4) Lyceum–Cavite ====
Arellano has the twice-to-beat advantage.

May 9, 2024; 9:00 a.m.	Arellano Braves	3–1	Lyceum Junior Pirates	Arellano University A. Mabini Gym, Manila; Attendance: 50
May 9, 2024; 9:00 a.m.	(25–16, 26–24, 21–25, 25–20)			Arellano University A. Mabini Gym, Manila; Attendance: 50
May 9, 2024; 9:00 a.m.	Arellano wins series in one game			Arellano University A. Mabini Gym, Manila; Attendance: 50

==== (2) Perpetual vs. (3) Malayan ====
Perpetual has the twice-to-beat advantage.

May 9, 2024; 11:00 a.m.	Perpetual Junior Altas	2–3	Malayan Junior Spikers	Arellano University A. Mabini Gym, Manila; Attendance: 50
May 9, 2024; 11:00 a.m.	(25–14, 20–25, 25–13, 22–25, 12–15)			Arellano University A. Mabini Gym, Manila; Attendance: 50

May 10, 2024; 8:00 a.m.	Perpetual Junior Altas	1–3	Malayan Junior Spikers	Arellano University A. Mabini Gym, Manila; Attendance: 50
May 10, 2024; 8:00 a.m.	(24–26, 20–25, 25–20, 23–25)			Arellano University A. Mabini Gym, Manila; Attendance: 50
May 10, 2024; 8:00 a.m.	Malayan wins series in two games			Arellano University A. Mabini Gym, Manila; Attendance: 50

=== Third place playoff ===
The third place playoff is between semifinal losers.

May 13, 2024; 9:00 a.m.	Perpetual Junior Altas	3–0	Lyceum Junior Pirates	Arellano University A. Mabini Gym, Manila; Attendance: 100
May 13, 2024; 9:00 a.m.	(25–20, 25–20, 25–20)			Arellano University A. Mabini Gym, Manila; Attendance: 100

=== Finals ===
The finals is a best-of-three playoff.

May 12, 2024; 5:00 p.m.	Arellano Braves	0–3	Malayan Junior Spikers	Filoil EcoOil Centre, San Juan; Attendance: 300
May 12, 2024; 5:00 p.m.	(23–25, 16–25, 23–25)			Filoil EcoOil Centre, San Juan; Attendance: 300

May 15, 2024; 5:00 p.m.	Arellano Braves	0–3	Malayan Junior Spikers	Filoil EcoOil Centre, San Juan; Attendance: 500
May 15, 2024; 5:00 p.m.	(20–25, 21–25, 22–25)			Filoil EcoOil Centre, San Juan; Attendance: 500
May 15, 2024; 5:00 p.m.	Malayan wins series, 2–0			Filoil EcoOil Centre, San Juan; Attendance: 500

- Finals MVP: Charles Jordan Segui (Mapúa Red Robins)
- Coach of the Year: Ralph Ocampo (Mapúa Red Robins)

=== Awards ===
NCAA Season 99 boys' volleyball champions
Mapúa Red Robins
First title

- Most Valuable Player: Rodan Aguirre (Lyceum Junior Pirates)
- Rookie of the Year: Rayvhan Costello (Lyceum Junior Pirates)
- 1st best outside spiker: Rodan Aguirre (Lyceum Junior Pirates)
  - 2nd best outside spiker: Charles Jordan Segui (Mapúa Red Robins)
- 1st best middle blocker: Liam Mojica (Lyceum Junior Pirates)
  - 2nd best middle blocker: Louis Miguel dela Cruz (Perpetual Junior Altas)
- Best opposite spiker: Ace van Robnoel (Lyceum Junior Pirates)
- Best setter: Edwin Maverick de Lima (Lyceum Junior Pirates)
- Best libero: Edmark Abalos (Perpetual Junior Altas)

== Girls' tournament ==
=== Elimination round ===
==== Team standings ====
Pos	Team	Pld	W	L	Pts	SW	SL	SR	SPW	SPL	SPR	Qualification
1	Arellano Lady Braves (H)	5	5	0	14	10	1	10.000	223	170	1.312	Twice-to-beat in the semifinals
2	Perpetual Junior Lady Altas	5	3	2	10	7	4	1.750	263	209	1.258	Twice-to-beat in the semifinals
3	Lyceum Junior Lady Pirates	5	3	2	8	6	5	1.200	256	240	1.067	Twice-to-win in the semifinals
4	EAC–ICA Lady Brigadiers	5	3	2	9	7	4	1.750	265	256	1.035	Twice-to-win in the semifinals
5	JRU Light Lady Bombers	5	1	4	4	3	8	0.375	219	258	0.849	
6	La Salle Lady Greenies	5	0	5	0	0	10	0.000	117	200	0.585	

Rules for classification: 1) Number of wins; 2) match points; 3) sets ratio; 4) points ratio; 5) head-to-head record
(H) Host

==== Match-up results ====
Team ╲ Game	1	2	3	4	5
Arellano	UPHD school colors	JRU school colors	EAC school colors	CSB school colors	Lyceum school colors
EAC–ICA	CSB school colors	Lyceum school colors	Arellano school colors	JRU school colors	UPHD school colors
JRU	Lyceum school colors	Arellano school colors	UPHD school colors	JRU school colors	CSB school colors
LSGH	EAC school colors	UPHD school colors	Lyceum school colors	Arellano school colors	JRU school colors
Lyceum–Cavite	JRU school colors	EAC school colors	CSB school colors	UPHD school colors	Arellano school colors
Perpetual	Arellano school colors	CSB school colors	JRU school colors	Lyceum school colors	EAC school colors

= Win; = Loss; = Match cancelled

==== Scores ====
Teams	AU	EAC–ICA	JRU	LSGH	LPU–C	UPHSD
Arellano Lady Braves		2–0	2–0	2–0	2–0	2–1
EAC–ICA Lady Brigadiers			2–1	2–0	1–2	2–0
JRU Light Lady Bombers				2–0	0–2	0–2
La Salle Lady Greenies					0–2	0–2
Lyceum Junior Lady Pirates						0–2
Perpetual Junior Lady Altas						

Legend: Blue = left column team win; Red = top row team win.

=== Bracket ===
Semifinals (Nos. 1 & 2 have twice-to-beat advantage)
1	Arellano	3
4	EAC–ICA	1
2	Perpetual	3
3	Lyceum–Cavite	1

Finals (Best-of-three series)
1	Arellano	2	2
2	Perpetual	3	3
Third place playoff
4	EAC–ICA	3
3	Lyceum–Cavite	0

=== Semifinals ===
The top two seeds in the semifinals have the twice-to-beat advantage.

==== (1) Arellano vs. (4) EAC-ICA ====
Arellano has the twice-to-beat advantage.

May 9, 2024; 1:30 p.m.	Arellano Lady Braves	3–1	EAC–ICA Lady Brigadiers	Arellano University A. Mabini Gym, Manila; Attendance: 50
May 9, 2024; 1:30 p.m.	(25–19, 21–25, 25–12, 25–21)			Arellano University A. Mabini Gym, Manila; Attendance: 50
May 9, 2024; 1:30 p.m.	Arellano wins series in one game			Arellano University A. Mabini Gym, Manila; Attendance: 50

==== (2) Perpetual vs. (3) Lyceum–Cavite ====
Perpetual has the twice-to-beat advantage.

May 9, 2024; 3:30 p.m.	Perpetual Junior Lady Altas	3–1	Lyceum Junior Lady Pirates	Arellano University A. Mabini Gym, Manila; Attendance: 50
May 9, 2024; 3:30 p.m.	(28–26, 23–25, 25–20, 25–12)			Arellano University A. Mabini Gym, Manila; Attendance: 50
May 9, 2024; 3:30 p.m.	Perpetual wins series in one game			Arellano University A. Mabini Gym, Manila; Attendance: 50

=== Third place playoff ===
The third place playoff is between semifinal losers.

May 13, 2024; 10:30 a.m.	Lyceum Junior Lady Pirates	0–3	EAC–ICA Lady Brigadiers	Arellano University A. Mabini Gym, Manila; Attendance: 100
May 13, 2024; 10:30 a.m.	(21–25, 20–25, 17–25)			Arellano University A. Mabini Gym, Manila; Attendance: 100

=== Finals ===
The finals is a best-of-three playoff.

May 12, 2024; 8:00 a.m.	Arellano Lady Braves	2–3	Perpetual Junior Lady Altas	Filoil EcoOil Centre, San Juan; Attendance: 300
May 12, 2024; 8:00 a.m.	(22–25, 25–17, 24–26, 25–21, 13–15)			Filoil EcoOil Centre, San Juan; Attendance: 300

May 15, 2024; 7:30 a.m.	Arellano Lady Braves	2–3	Perpetual Junior Lady Altas	Filoil EcoOil Centre, San Juan; Attendance: 500
May 15, 2024; 7:30 a.m.	(25–19, 23–25, 26–24, 22–25, 16–18)			Filoil EcoOil Centre, San Juan; Attendance: 500
May 15, 2024; 7:30 a.m.	Perpetual wins series, 2–0			Filoil EcoOil Centre, San Juan; Attendance: 500

- Finals MVP: Jemalyn Menor (Perpetual Junior Lady Altas)
- Coach of the Year: Jason Sapin (Perpetual Junior Lady Altas)

=== Awards ===
NCAA Season 99 girls' volleyball champions
Perpetual Junior Lady Altas
First title

- Most Valuable Player: Samantha Hillary Maranan (Arellano Lady Braves)
- Rookie of the Year: Catherine Chu (Arellano Lady Braves)
- Freshman of the Year: Penelope May Vargas (Arellano Lady Braves)
- 1st best outside spiker: Catherine Chu (Arellano Lady Braves)
  - 2nd best outside spiker: Angel Joy Perez (EAC–ICA Lady Brigadiers)
- 1st best middle blocker: Laurene Alexis Yap (EAC–ICA Lady Brigadiers)
  - 2nd best middle blocker: Ronna Ria Diaz (Arellano Lady Braves)
- Best opposite spiker: Trisha Mae Pulmones (Lyceum Junior Lady Pirates)
- Best setter: Jasmine Monte (Perpetual Junior Lady Altas)
- Best libero: Janine Espiritu (Perpetual Junior Lady Altas)

== See also ==
- UAAP Season 86 volleyball tournaments

Preceded by Season 98 (2023)	NCAA volleyball tournaments Season 99 (2024)	Succeeded by Season 100 (2025)
