= NCAA Season 99 =

2023–24 Filipino college athletic season

- "New Heroes of the Game"
- Host school: José Rizal University

Overall
- Seniors: San Beda University
- Juniors: University of Perpetual Help System DALTA

Seniors' champions
Sport		Men	Women
Basketball		San Beda	NT
Volleyball		Perpetual	Benilde
Badminton		San Beda	San Sebastian
Taekwondo		San Beda	San Beda
Chess		Perpetual	NT
Swimming		San Beda	San Beda
Beach volleyball		Perpetual	Letran
Table tennis		Benilde	Perpetual
Football		San Beda	NT
Lawn tennis		Benilde	Benilde
Soft tennis		Benilde	Perpetual
3x3 basketball		JRU	NT
Track and field		JRU	NT
- Cheerdance: Arellano (Ex - Coed)

Juniors' champions
Sport		Boys	Girls
Basketball		Letran	NT
Volleyball		Mapúa	Perpetual
Badminton		San Sebastian	NT
Taekwondo		San Beda	NT
Chess		Lyceum	NT
Swimming		LSGH	NT
Beach volleyball		EAC	NT
Table tennis		Perpetual	NT
Lawn tennis		LSGH	NT
3x3 basketball		Perpetual	NT
Kiddie basketball		Arellano	NT
Track and field		Perpetual	NT
- (NT) = No tournament; (DS) = Demonstration Sport; (Ex) = Exhibition;

NCAA Season 99 was the 2023–24 season of the National Collegiate Athletic Association (Philippines) (NCAA). It was hosted by José Rizal University (JRU). The opening ceremony was held on September 24, 2023, at the SM Mall of Asia Arena.

== Background ==
On April 30, 2023, Emilio Aguinaldo College handed over the hosting duties of the NCAA to José Rizal University during the NCAA Cheerleading Competition of the NCAA Season 98 at the Rizal Memorial Coliseum. The NCAA is expected resume tournaments for badminton and table tennis, after being not held due to the COVID-19 pandemic.

The sporting calendar had been re-expanded which has been previously reduced due to the COVID-19 pandemic. Badminton and table tennis had been reintroduced while new disciplines such as kiddie basketball and 3x3 were introduced. In addition, a battle-for-third was introduced for the first time in association history, which was used for all events except for track and field and swimming.

Broadcaster GMA Network also introduced AI sportscasters Maia and Marco for the season with the use of image generation, text-to-speech voice and face animation technology.

== Sports calendar ==
Sport	Tournament(s)			Host	Duration	Venue(s)	Ref
Sport	M	W	J	Host	Duration	Venue(s)	Ref
Basketball	check			JRU	September 24 – December 17, 2023	SM Mall of Asia Arena, Pasay; Smart Araneta Coliseum, Quezon City; Filoil EcoOil Centre, San Juan	
Basketball			check	JRU	February 10 – March 23, 2024	Filoil EcoOil Centre, San Juan	
Kiddie basketball			check	Letran	June 12 – July 7, 2024	Arellano University A. Mabini Gym, Manila	
Badminton	check	check	check	San Sebastian	October 16 – 25, 2023	Power Up Centro Atletico, Quezon City	
Chess	check		check	Letran	October 28 – November 30, 2023	Colegio de San Juan de Letran, Manila	
Taekwondo	check	check	check	Benilde	November 15 – 16, 2023	Ayala Malls Manila Bay Activity Center, Parañaque	
Swimming	check	check	check	EAC	December 13 – 15, 2023	Teofilo Ildefonso Swimming Pool, Manila	
Beach volleyball	check	check	check	Arellano	January 24 – 28, 2024	Subic Bay Sand Courts, Olongapo	
Table tennis	check	check	check	Mapúa	January 29 – February 1, 2024	Emilio Aguinaldo College Gymnasium, Manila	
Football	check			San Beda	February 19 – March 11, 2024	Rizal Memorial Stadium, Manila	
Lawn tennis	check	check			March 15 – 23, 2024	Philippine Columbian Association Sports Club, Manila	
Soft tennis	check	check			April 15 – 21, 2024	Rizal Memorial Tennis Center, Manila	
Volleyball (indoor)	check	check		Perpetual	April 7 – May 26, 2024	Filoil EcoOil Centre, San Juan; San Andres Sports Complex, Manila	
Volleyball (indoor)			check	Arellano	April 8 – May 26, 2024	Arellano University A. Mabini Gym, Manila; Filoil EcoOil Centre, San Juan	
3×3 basketball	check		check	JRU	May 24 – 25, 2024	Jose Rizal University Gymnasium, Mandaluyong	
Track & field	check		check	Lyceum	June 6 – 8, 2024	PhilSports Complex, Pasig	
Cheerleading Competition	(Ex-Coed)			JRU	June 19, 2024	Filoil EcoOil Centre, San Juan	

== Basketball ==
The NCAA basketball championships are divided into two tournaments: the seniors' and juniors' tournaments. The seniors' tournament started on September 24, with the SM Mall of Asia Arena hosting opening day, Filoil EcoOil Centre hosting the rest of the elimination round, then returning to the SM Mall of Asia Arena and the Araneta Coliseum for the playoffs.

=== Men's tournament ===
The first games were the hosts JRU Heavy Bombers against the 3-peat champions Letran Knights and last season's runners-up Benilde Blazers against the Lyceum Pirates.

==== Elimination round ====
Pos	Team	W	L	PCT	GB	Qualification
1	Mapúa Cardinals	15	3	.833	—	Twice-to-beat in the semifinals
2	Lyceum Pirates	13	5	.722	2	Twice-to-beat in the semifinals
3	San Beda Red Lions	12	6	.667	3	Twice-to-win in the semifinals
4	Benilde Blazers	11	7	.611	4	Twice-to-win in the semifinals
5	Perpetual Altas	10	8	.556 (Note: Head-to-head differential: Perpetual +5, JRU −5)	5	
6	JRU Heavy Bombers (H)	10	8	.556	5	
7	EAC Generals	9	9	.500	6	
8	San Sebastian Stags	6	12	.333	9	
9	Letran Knights	2	16	.111 (Note: Head-to-head differential: Letran +2, Arellano −2)	13	
10	Arellano Chiefs	2	16	.111	13	

Source: GMA
(H) Hosts

==== Playoffs ====
Semifinals (Top 2 twice-to-beat)
1	Mapúa	78
4	Benilde	67
2	Lyceum	68	72
3	San Beda	89	82

Finals (Best-of-three playoff)
1	Mapúa	68	65	66
3	San Beda	63	71	76
Third place playoff
4	Benilde	93
2	Lyceum	83

==== Awards ====
- Most Valuable Player: Clint Escamis (Mapúa Cardinals)
- Rookie of the Year: Clint Escamis (Mapúa Cardinals)

=== Juniors' tournament ===
==== Elimination round ====
Pos	Team	W	L	PCT	GB	Qualification
1	Perpetual Junior Altas	8	1	.889	—	Twice-to-beat in the semifinals
2	Letran Squires	7	2	.778	1	Twice-to-beat in the semifinals
3	San Sebastian Staglets	6	3	.667 (Note: Head-to-head differential: San Sebastian +6, Malayan −6)	2	Twice-to-win in the semifinals
4	Mapúa Red Robins	6	3	.667	2	Twice-to-win in the semifinals
5	San Beda Red Cubs	5	4	.556	3	
6	EAC–ICA Brigadiers	4	5	.444	4	
7	La Salle Green Hills Greenies	3	6	.333 (Note: Head-to-head differential: JRU +5, LSGH −5)	5	
8	JRU Light Bombers (H)	3	6	.333	5	
9	Lyceum Junior Pirates	2	7	.222	6	
10	Arellano Braves	1	8	.111	7	

Source: GMA
(H) Hosts

==== Playoffs ====
Semifinals (Top 2 twice-to-beat)
1	Perpetual	96
4	Malayan	91
2	Letran	91
3	San Sebastian	77

Finals (Best-of-three playoff)
1	Perpetual	80	91	76
2	Letran	97	90	93
Third place playoff
4	Malayan	64
3	San Sebastian	62

==== Awards ====
- Most Valuable Player: Amiel Acido (Perpetual Junior Altas)
- Rookie of the Year: Mark Gojo Cruz (Perpetual Junior Altas)

=== Kiddies' tournament ===
==== Elimination round ====
Pos	Team	W	L	PCT	GB	Qualification
1	San Beda Red Cubs	6	1	.857	—	Twice-to-beat in the semifinals
2	Arellano Braves	6	1	.857	—	Twice-to-beat in the semifinals
3	Lyceum Junior Pirates	5	2	.714	1	Twice-to-win in the semifinals
4	San Sebastian Staglets	4	3	.571	2	Twice-to-win in the semifinals
5	Letran Squires (H)	3	4	.429	3	
6	La Salle Green Hills Greenies	3	4	.429	3	
7	Mapúa Red Robins	1	6	.143	5	
8	JRU Light Bombers	0	7	.000	6	

(H) Hosts

==== Playoffs ====
Semifinals (Top 2 twice-to-beat)
1	San Beda–Rizal	61	81
4	San Sebastian	83	70
2	Arellano	83*	97
3	Lyceum–Cavite	84*	80

Finals (Single-elimination)
1	San Beda–Rizal	71
2	Arellano	75

*Overtime

== 3×3 basketball ==
The NCAA 3x3 Basketball tournaments were held in the Jose Rizal University Gymnasium in Mandaluyong.

=== Men's tournament ===
==== Elimination round ====
Pool A
Pos	Team	W	L	PCT	Qualification
1	JRU Heavy Bombers (H)	4	0	**1.000**	Advance to the semifinals
2	Benilde Blazers	3	1	**.750**	Advance to the semifinals
3	Letran Knights	1	3	**.250**	
4	Arellano Chiefs	1	3	**.250**	
5	Lyceum Pirates	1	3	**.250**	

Source: NCAA Season 99 3x3
Rules for classification: 1) winning percentage; 2) if tied for #2 or #4, one-game playoff; 3) head-to-head record; 4) head-to-head point differential; 5) overall point differential
(H) Hosts

Pool B
Pos	Team	W	L	PCT	Qualification
1	San Sebastian Stags	3	1	**.750**	Advance to the semifinals
2	San Beda Red Lions	3	1	**.750**	Advance to the semifinals
3	Mapúa Cardinals	3	1	**.750**	
4	EAC Generals	1	3	**.250**	
5	Perpetual Altas	0	4	**.000**	

Source: NCAA Season 99 3x3
Rules for classification: 1) winning percentage; 2) if tied for #2 or #4, one-game playoff; 3) head-to-head record; 4) head-to-head point differential; 5) overall point differential

===== Match results =====
All times are Philippine Standard Time (UTC+08:00).

Pool A
Date	Time	Team 1	Score	Team 2
May 24	09:15	Arellano Chiefs	12–**18**	**Letran Knights**
May 24	10:15	Lyceum Pirates	16–**18**	**JRU Heavy Bombers**
May 24	11:15	Letran Knights	20–**22**	**Lyceum Pirates**
May 24	12:15	**Benilde Blazers**	**17**–15	Arellano Chiefs
May 24	15:45	Lyceum Pirates	13–**22**	**Benilde Blazers**
May 24	16:45	**JRU Heavy Bombers**	**17**–14	Letran Knights
May 24	17:45	Benilde Blazers	16–**18**	**JRU Heavy Bombers**
May 24	18:45	**Arellano Chiefs**	**19**–13	Lyceum Pirates
May 25	10:15	**JRU Heavy Bombers**	**19**–11	Arellano Chiefs
May 25	11:15	Letran Knights	L–**W**	**Benilde Blazers**

Pool B
Date	Time	Team 1	Score	Team 2
May 24	09:45	EAC Generals	15–**21**	**San Sebastian Stags**
May 24	10:45	Perpetual Altas	19–**22**	**San Beda Red Lions**
May 24	11:45	**San Sebastian Stags**	**21**–8	Perpetual Altas
May 24	15:15	**Mapúa Cardinals**	**18**–12	EAC Generals
May 24	16:15	Perpetual Altas	11–**16**	**Mapúa Cardinals**
May 24	17:15	San Beda Red Lions	14–**19**	**San Sebastian Stags**
May 24	18:15	Mapúa Cardinals	16–**21**	**San Beda Red Lions**
May 25	09:45	**EAC Generals**	**20**–19	Perpetual Altas
May 25	10:45	**San Beda Red Lions**	**21**–7	EAC Generals
May 25	11:45	San Sebastian Stags	17–**19**	**Mapúa Cardinals**

==== Playoffs ====
Semifinals
**A1**	**JRU**	**21**
B2	San Beda	12
**B1**	**San Sebastian**	**20**
A2	Benilde	19

Finals
**A1**	**JRU**	**21**
B1	San Sebastian	20
Third place
B2	San Beda	11
**A2**	**Benilde**	**19**

===== Match results =====
All times are Philippine Standard Time (UTC+08:00).

Semifinals
Date	Time	Team 1	Score	Team 2
May 25	14:15	**JRU Heavy Bombers**	**21**–12	San Beda Red Lions
May 25	14:45	**San Sebastian Stags**	**20**–19	Benilde Blazers

Third place
Date	Time	Team 1	Score	Team 2
May 25	15:45	San Beda Red Lions	11–**19**	**Benilde Blazers**

Finals
Date	Time	Team 1	Score	Team 2
May 25	16:15	**JRU Heavy Bombers**	**21**–20	San Sebastian Stags

=== Juniors' tournament ===
==== Elimination round ====
Pool A
Pos	Team	W	L	PCT	Qualification
1	JRU Light Bombers (H)	4	0	**1.000**	Advance to the semifinals
2	Perpetual Junior Altas	3	1	**.750**	Advance to the semifinals
3	Arellano Braves	2	2	**.500**	
4	Mapúa Red Robins	1	3	**.250**	
5	Lyceum Junior Pirates	0	4	**.000**	

Source: NCAA Season 99 3x3
Rules for classification: 1) winning percentage; 2) if tied for #2 or #4, one-game playoff; 3) head-to-head record; 4) head-to-head point differential; 5) overall point differential
(H) Hosts

Pool B
Pos	Team	W	L	PCT	Qualification
1	San Beda Red Cubs	3	1	**.750**	Advance to the semifinals
2	La Salle Green Hills Greenies	3	1	**.750**	Advance to the semifinals
3	San Sebastian Staglets	2	2	**.500**	
4	EAC–ICA Brigadiers	1	3	**.250**	
5	Letran Squires	1	3	**.250**	

Source: NCAA Season 99 3x3
Rules for classification: 1) winning percentage; 2) if tied for #2 or #4, one-game playoff; 3) head-to-head record; 4) head-to-head point differential; 5) overall point differential

===== Match results =====
All times are Philippine Standard Time (UTC+08:00).

Pool A
Date	Time	Team 1	Score	Team 2
May 24	09:00	**Perpetual Junior Altas**	**21**–18	Mapúa Red Robins
May 24	10:00	Lyceum Junior Pirates	14–**15**	**Arellano Braves**
May 24	11:00	**Mapúa Red Robins**	**18**–12	Lyceum Junior Pirates
May 24	12:00	**JRU Light Bombers**	**21**–18	Perpetual Junior Altas
May 24	15:30	Lyceum Junior Pirates	14–**19**	**JRU Light Bombers**
May 24	16:30	**Arellano Braves**	**17**–13	Mapúa Red Robins
May 24	17:30	**JRU Light Bombers**	**21**–11	Arellano Braves
May 24	18:30	**Perpetual Junior Altas**	**21**–11	Lyceum Junior Pirates
May 25	10:00	Arellano Braves	17–**19**	**Perpetual Junior Altas**
May 25	11:00	Mapúa Red Robins	20–**21**	**JRU Light Bombers**

Pool B
Date	Time	Team 1	Score	Team 2
May 24	09:30	**San Beda Red Cubs**	**21**–14	San Sebastian Staglets
May 24	10:30	**EAC–ICA Brigadiers**	**21**–16	Letran Squires
May 24	11:30	**San Sebastian Staglets**	**21**–13	EAC–ICA Brigadiers
May 24	15:00	La Salle Green Hills Greenies	18–**21**	**San Beda Red Cubs**
May 24	16:00	EAC–ICA Brigadiers	7–**21**	**La Salle Green Hills Greenies**
May 24	17:00	Letran Squires	17–**19**	**San Sebastian Staglets**
May 24	18:00	La Salle Green Hills Greenies	**15**–14	Letran Squires
May 25	09:30	**San Beda Red Cubs**	**21**–16	EAC–ICA Brigadiers
May 25	10:30	**Letran Squires**	**21**–20	San Beda Red Cubs
May 25	11:30	San Sebastian Staglets	20–**21**	**La Salle Green Hills Greenies**

==== Playoffs ====
Semifinals
A1	JRU	18
**B2**	**LSGH**	**21**
B1	San Beda–Rizal	19
**A2**	**Perpetual**	**21**

Finals
B2	LSGH	9
**A2**	**Perpetual**	**16**
Third place
A1	JRU	17
**B1**	**San Beda–Rizal**	**20**

===== Match results =====
All times are Philippine Standard Time (UTC+08:00).

Semifinals
Date	Time	Team 1	Score	Team 2
May 25	14:00	JRU Light Bombers	18–**21**	**La Salle Green Hills Greenies**
May 25	14:30	San Beda Red Cubs	19–**21**	Perpetual Junior Altas

Third place
Date	Time	Team 1	Score	Team 2
May 25	15:30	JRU Light Bombers	17–**20**	**San Beda Red Cubs**

Finals
Date	Time	Team 1	Score	Team 2
May 25	16:00	La Salle Green Hills Greenies	9–**16**	**Perpetual Junior Altas**

=== Awards ===
Division	Champions	1st Runners-Up	2nd Runners-Up
Seniors	JRU Heavy Bombers; Karl Bench De Jesus; Joshua Guiab; **Jonathan Medina**; Vince Sarmiento	San Sebastian Stags; Caesleyh Kent Bacani; Tristan Jeremiah Felebrico; Ralph Lauren Gabat; Reggz Albert Gabat	Benilde Blazers; Jericho Jalalon; Edson Serrano; Irele Galas; Roger Ondoa
Juniors	Perpetual Junior Altas; **Icee Callangan**; Lebron Jhames Daep; Jan Pagulayan; Don Louie Rosales	La Salle Green Hills Greenies; James Ison; Dale Ortega; Arle Godfriday Podador; Ram Sharma	San Beda Red Cubs; Kirk Cañete; Drei Lorenzo; Randaile Medroso; MJ Hendric Vailoces

- Boldface marked as MVP

== Badminton ==
The NCAA badminton championships were held at the Power Up Centro Atletico in Cubao, Quezon City from October 16 to 25, 2023.

=== Men's tournament ===
Pos	Team	Pld	W	L	Pts	Qualification
1	San Beda Red Smashers	5	5	0	5	Twice-to-beat in semifinals
2	CSB Blazing Shuttlers	5	4	1	4	Twice-to-beat in semifinals
3	San Sebastian Stags (H)	5	3	2	3	Twice-to-win in semifinals
4	Mapúa Cardinal Shuttlers	5	2	3	2	Twice-to-win in semifinals
5	Lyceum Pirates	5	1	4	1	
6	EAC Generals	5	0	5	0	

(H) Host

==== Playoffs ====
Semifinals
1	San Beda	2
4	Mapúa	0
2	Benilde	2
3	San Sebastian	1

Finals
1	San Beda	2
2	Benilde	0
Third place
4	Mapúa	L
3	San Sebastian	W

==== Awards ====
- Most Valuable Player: Arjay Philip L. Lazareto (San Beda Red Lions)
- Rookie of the Year: Ramon Timothy Santos (San Beda Red Lions)
- Coach of the Year: Ronald Magnaye (San Beda Red Lions)

=== Women's tournament ===
Pos	Team	Pld	W	L	Pts	Qualification
1	San Sebastian Lady Stags (H)	5	5	0	5	Twice-to-beat in semifinals
2	San Beda Lady Smashers	5	4	1	4	Twice-to-beat in semifinals
3	CSB Lady Shuttlers	5	3	2	3	Twice-to-win in semifinals
4	Lyceum Lady Pirates	5	2	3	2	Twice-to-win in semifinals
5	Mapúa Lady Cardinal Shuttlers	5	1	4	1	
6	EAC Lady Generals	5	0	5	0	

(H) Host

==== Playoffs ====
Semifinals
1	San Sebastian	2
4	Lyceum	1
2	San Beda	2
3	Benilde	0

Finals
1	San Sebastian	2
2	San Beda	0
Third place
4	Lyceum	L
3	Benilde	W

==== Awards ====
- Most Valuable Player: Nenia Solinap (San Sebastian Lady Stags)
- Rookie of the Year: Shamtella Amante (Benilde Lady Blazers)
- Coach of the Year: Jeffrey Landagan (San Sebastian Lady Stags)

=== Juniors' tournament ===
Pos	Team	Pld	W	L	Pts	Qualification
1	San Sebastian Staglets (H)	3	3	0	3	Twice-to-beat in semifinals
2	San Beda Red Cubs	3	2	1	2	Twice-to-beat in semifinals
3	La Salle Green Hills Greenies	3	1	2	1	Twice-to-win in semifinals
4	Mapúa Junior Cardinal Shuttlers	3	0	3	0	Twice-to-win in semifinals

(H) Host

==== Playoffs ====
Semifinals
1	San Sebastian	3
4	Malayan	0
2	San Beda–Rizal	2
3	LSGH	1

Finals
1	San Sebastian	2
2	San Beda–Rizal	0
Third place
4	Malayan	W
3	LSGH	L

==== Awards ====
- Most Valuable Player: Zeth Quiambao (San Sebastian Staglets)
- Rookie of the Year: Mark Anthony Bernal (San Sebastian Staglets)

== Volleyball ==
The NCAA seniors' volleyball tournaments began on April 7, 2024.

=== Men's tournament ===
==== Elimination round ====
Pos	Team	Pld	W	L	Pts	SW	SL	SR	SPW	SPL	SPR	Qualification
1	Perpetual Altas (H)	9	9	0	26	27	3	9.000	734	580	1.266	Advance to the Finals (Note: As Perpetual won all of their elimination round games, the stepladder format will be used instead of the regular Final Four format.)
2	EAC Generals	9	8	1	22	24	10	2.400	802	713	1.125	Proceed to stepladder round 2
3	Letran Knights	9	6	3	16	20	16	1.250	840	790	1.063	Proceed to stepladder round 1
4	Arellano Chiefs	9	5	4	14	18	15	1.200	760	743	1.023	Proceed to stepladder round 1
5	Benilde Blazers	9	4	5	15	21	18	1.167	868	836	1.038	
6	San Beda Red Spikers	9	4	5	12	18	21	0.857	844	855	0.987	
7	San Sebastian Stags	9	4	5	11	15	21	0.714	774	815	0.950	
8	Mapúa Cardinals	9	3	6	12	18	21	0.857	819	867	0.945	
9	JRU Heavy Bombers	9	2	7	6	10	23	0.435	687	761	0.903	
10	Lyceum Pirates	9	0	9	1	4	27	0.148	586	754	0.777	

Rules for classification: 1) Number of wins; 2) match points; 3) sets ratio; 4) points ratio; 5) head-to-head record
(H) Host
Notes:

Point system:

3 points = win match in 3 or 4 sets
2 points = win match in 5 sets
1 point = lose match in 5 sets
0 point = lose match in 3 or 4 sets

==== Playoffs ====
Stepladder round 1 (Single elimination)
3	Letran	3
4	Arellano	1

Stepladder round 2 (Single elimination)
2	EAC	3
3	Letran	1

Finals (Best-of-three series)
1	Perpetual	3	3
2	EAC	1	0

==== Awards ====
- Most Valuable Player: Louie Ramirez (Perpetual Altas)
- Rookie of the Year: Axel van Book (San Beda Red Lions)

=== Women's tournament ===
==== Elimination round ====
Pos	Team	Pld	W	L	Pts	SW	SL	SR	SPW	SPL	SPR	Qualification
1	Benilde Lady Blazers	9	9	0	26	27	3	9.000	729	511	1.427	Advance to the Finals (Note: As Benilde won all of their elimination round games, the stepladder format will be used instead of the regular Final Four format.)
2	Letran Lady Knights	9	7	2	19	22	13	1.692	814	746	1.091	Proceed to stepladder round 2
3	Lyceum Lady Pirates	9	6	3	19	23	15	1.533	846	790	1.071	Proceed to stepladder round 1
4	Arellano Lady Chiefs	9	6	3	17	20	13	1.538	738	703	1.050	Proceed to stepladder round 1
5	Mapúa Lady Cardinals	9	6	3	17	19	13	1.462	739	698	1.059	
6	Perpetual Lady Altas (H)	9	5	4	15	18	16	1.125	737	721	1.022	
7	San Beda Lady Red Spikers	9	3	6	9	15	22	0.682	755	799	0.945	
8	San Sebastian Lady Stags	9	2	7	9	14	23	0.609	767	849	0.903	
9	JRU Lady Bombers	9	1	8	4	6	24	0.250	558	715	0.780	
10	EAC Lady Generals	9	0	9	0	5	27	0.185	626	778	0.805	

Rules for classification: 1) Number of wins; 2) match points; 3) sets ratio; 4) points ratio; 5) head-to-head record
(H) Host
Notes:

Point system:

3 points = win match in 3 or 4 sets
2 points = win match in 5 sets
1 point = lose match in 5 sets
0 point = lose match in 3 or 4 sets

==== Playoffs ====
Stepladder round 1 (Single elimination)
3	Lyceum	3
4	Arellano	1

Stepladder round 2 (Single elimination)
2	Letran	3
3	Lyceum	2

Finals (Best-of-three series)
1	Benilde	3	3
2	Letran	0	0

==== Awards ====
- Most Valuable Player: Cloanne Sophia Mondoñedo (Benilde Lady Blazers)
- Rookie of the Year: Angel Mae Habacon (San Beda Red Lionesses)

=== Boys' tournament ===
==== Elimination round ====
Pos	Team	Pld	W	L	Pts	SW	SL	SR	SPW	SPL	SPR	Qualification
1	Arellano Braves (H)	8	7	1	21	13	3	4.333	450	369	1.220	Twice-to-beat in the semifinals
2	Perpetual Junior Altas	8	7	1	20	14	1	14.000	420	320	1.313	Twice-to-beat in the semifinals
3	Malayan Junior Spikers	8	6	2	20	14	4	3.500	434	372	1.167	Twice-to-win in the semifinals
4	Lyceum Junior Pirates	8	5	3	15	11	6	1.833	383	351	1.091	Twice-to-win in the semifinals
5	Letran Squires	8	5	3	14	19	8	2.375	387	356	1.087	
6	EAC–ICA Brigadiers	8	3	5	9	7	10	0.700	339	364	0.931	
7	San Beda Junior Red Spikers	8	2	6	6	4	12	0.333	317	377	0.841	
8	JRU Light Bombers	8	1	7	2	2	15	0.133	336	406	0.828	
9	La Salle Green Hills Greenies	8	0	8	1	1	16	0.063	263	420	0.626	

Rules for classification: 1) Number of wins; 2) match points; 3) sets ratio; 4) points ratio; 5) head-to-head record
(H) Host

==== Playoffs ====
Semifinals (Nos. 1 & 2 have twice-to-beat advantage)
1	Arellano	3
4	Lyceum–Cavite	1
2	Perpetual	2	1
3	Malayan	3	3

Finals (Best-of-three series)
1	Arellano	0	0
3	Malayan	3	3
Third place playoff
4	Lyceum–Cavite	0
2	Perpetual	3

==== Awards ====
- Most Valuable Player: Rodan Aguirre (Lyceum Junior Pirates)
- Rookie of the Year: Rayvhan Costello (Lyceum Junior Pirates)

=== Girls' tournament ===
==== Elimination round ====
Pos	Team	Pld	W	L	Pts	SW	SL	SR	SPW	SPL	SPR	Qualification
1	Arellano Lady Braves (H)	5	5	0	14	10	1	10.000	223	170	1.312	Twice-to-beat in the semifinals
2	Perpetual Junior Lady Altas	5	3	2	10	7	4	1.750	263	209	1.258	Twice-to-beat in the semifinals
3	Lyceum Junior Lady Pirates	5	3	2	8	6	5	1.200	256	240	1.067	Twice-to-win in the semifinals
4	EAC–ICA Lady Brigadiers	5	3	2	9	7	4	1.750	265	256	1.035	Twice-to-win in the semifinals
5	JRU Light Lady Bombers	5	1	4	4	3	8	0.375	219	258	0.849	
6	La Salle Lady Greenies	5	0	5	0	0	10	0.000	117	200	0.585	

Rules for classification: 1) Number of wins; 2) match points; 3) sets ratio; 4) points ratio; 5) head-to-head record
(H) Host

==== Playoffs ====
Semifinals (Nos. 1 & 2 have twice-to-beat advantage)
1	Arellano	3
4	EAC–ICA	1
2	Perpetual	3
3	Lyceum–Cavite	1

Finals (Best-of-three series)
1	Arellano	2	2
2	Perpetual	3	3
Third place playoff
4	EAC–ICA	3
3	Lyceum–Cavite	0

==== Awards ====
- Most Valuable Player: Samantha Hillary Maranan (Arellano Lady Braves)
- Rookie of the Year: Catherine Chu (Arellano Lady Braves)

== Beach volleyball ==
The NCAA beach volleyball tournaments started on January 24, 2024, in the Subic Bay Sand Courts in Olongapo. Perpetual, Letran, and EAC–ICA won the men's, women's, and juniors' tournaments, respectively.

=== Men's tournament ===
==== Elimination round ====
===== Team standings =====
Pos	Team	Pld	W	L	Pts	SW	SL	SR	SPW	SPL	SPR	Qualification
1	Mapúa Cardinals	9	7	2	16	2	2	1.000	45	50	0.900	Twice-to-beat in the semifinals
2	Perpetual Altas	9	7	2	16	3	2	1.500	52	55	0.945	Twice-to-beat in the semifinals
3	Arellano Chiefs (H)	9	7	2	16	2	1	2.000	60	51	1.176	Twice-to-win in the semifinals
4	JRU Heavy Bombers	9	6	3	15	2	1	2.000	55	52	1.058	Twice-to-win in the semifinals
5	Benilde Blazers	9	6	3	15	5	3	1.667	99	113	0.876	
6	San Sebastian Stags	9	4	5	13	1	2	0.500	53	48	1.104	
7	EAC Generals	9	3	6	12	1	2	0.500	50	45	1.111	
8	San Beda Red Lions	9	3	6	12	2	2	1.000	42	32	1.313	
9	Letran Knights	9	3	6	12	2	6	0.333	43	35	1.229	
10	Lyceum Pirates	9	0	9	9	1	9	0.111	32	42	0.762	

Rules for classification: 1) winning percentage; 2) if tied for #2 or #4, one-game playoff; 3) head-to-head record; 4) match points; 5) sets ratio; 6) points ratio
(H) Host

===== Match-up results =====
Team ╲ Game	1	2	3	4	5	6	7	8	9
Arellano	CSB school colors	Letran school colors	JRU school colors	San Beda school colors	Mapua school colors	EAC school colors	Lyceum school colors	UPHD school colors	SSC-R school colors
Letran	JRU school colors	Arellano school colors	Mapua school colors	Lyceum school colors	SSC-R school colors	CSB school colors	San Beda school colors	EAC school colors	UPHD school colors
Benilde	Arellano school colors	SSC-R school colors	San Beda school colors	EAC school colors	UPHD school colors	Letran school colors	JRU school colors	Mapua school colors	Lyceum school colors
EAC	Mapua school colors	Lyceum school colors	SSC-R school colors	CSB school colors	San Beda school colors	Arellano school colors	UPHD school colors	Letran school colors	JRU school colors
JRU	UPHD school colors	Letran school colors	Arellano school colors	Mapua school colors	Lyceum school colors	SSC-R school colors	CSB school colors	San Beda school colors	EAC school colors
Lyceum	San Beda school colors	EAC school colors	UPHD school colors	Letran school colors	JRU school colors	Mapua school colors	Arellano school colors	SSC-R school colors	CSB school colors
Mapúa	EAC school colors	UPHD school colors	Letran school colors	JRU school colors	Arellano school colors	Lyceum school colors	SSC-R school colors	CSB school colors	San Beda school colors
San Beda	Lyceum school colors	SSC-R school colors	CSB school colors	Arellano school colors	EAC school colors	UPHD school colors	Letran school colors	JRU school colors	Mapua school colors
San Sebastian	CSB school colors	San Beda school colors	EAC school colors	UPHD school colors	Letran school colors	JRU school colors	Mapua school colors	Lyceum school colors	Arellano school colors
Perpetual	JRU school colors	Mapua school colors	Lyceum school colors	SSC-R school colors	CSB school colors	San Beda school colors	EAC school colors	Arellano school colors	Letran school colors

= Win; = Loss

===== Game results =====
Results on top and to the right of the solid cells are for first-round games; those to the bottom and to the left of it are second-round games.

Teams	AU	CSJL	CSB	EAC	JRU	LPU	MU	SBU	SSC–R	UPHSD
Arellano Chiefs		2–0	2–1	2–0	1–2	2–0	2–0	2–0	2–0	2–0
Letran Knights			0–2	0–2	0–2	2–0	–	–	–	–
Benilde Blazers				2–0	2–0	–	–	2–0	2–1	1–2
EAC Generals					–	2–0	1–2	2–0	2–0	0–2
JRU Heavy Bombers						–	–	0–2	0–2	2–1
Lyceum Pirates							–	0–2	0–2	0–2
Mapúa Cardinals								–	2–0	0–2
San Beda Red Lions									2–0	0–2
San Sebastian Stags										0–2
Perpetual Altas										

Legend: Blue = left column team win; Red = top row team win.

==== Playoffs ====
Semifinals (Nos. 1 & 2 have twice-to-beat advantage)
1	Mapúa	2
4	JRU	0
2	Perpetual	2
3	Arellano	0

Finals (Knockout)
1	Mapúa	0
2	Perpetual	2
3rd place (Knockout)
4	JRU	2
3	Arellano	0

==== Semifinals ====
Both Mapúa and Perpetual have the twice-to-beat advantage while they only have to win once, while their opponents twice, to advance to the Finals.

===== Mapúa vs. JRU =====
28 January 2024	Mapúa Cardinals	2–0	JRU Heavy Bombers	Subic Bay Sand Courts, Olongapo
28 January 2024	(21–18, 21–17)			Subic Bay Sand Courts, Olongapo
28 January 2024	Mapúa wins series in one game			Subic Bay Sand Courts, Olongapo

===== Perpetual vs. Arellano =====
28 January 2024	Perpetual Altas	2–0	Arellano Chiefs	Subic Bay Sand Courts, Olongapo
28 January 2024	(21–11, 21–15)			Subic Bay Sand Courts, Olongapo
28 January 2024	Perpetual wins series in one game			Subic Bay Sand Courts, Olongapo

==== Third place playoff ====
===== Arellano vs. JRU =====
28 January 2024	Arellano Chiefs	0–2	JRU Heavy Bombers	Subic Bay Sand Courts, Olongapo
28 January 2024	(11–21, 9–21)			Subic Bay Sand Courts, Olongapo
28 January 2024	JRU wins third place			Subic Bay Sand Courts, Olongapo

==== Finals ====
===== Mapúa vs. Perpetual =====
28 January 2024	Mapúa Cardinals	0–2	Perpetual Altas	Subic Bay Sand Courts, Olongapo
28 January 2024	(19–21, 13–21)			Subic Bay Sand Courts, Olongapo
28 January 2024	Perpetual wins championship			Subic Bay Sand Courts, Olongapo

==== Awards ====
- Most Valuable Player: Louie Ramirez (Perpetual Altas)
- Rookie of the Year: James Harold Marasigan (Benilde Blazers)
- Coach of the Year: Michael Carino (Perpetual Altas)

=== Women's tournament ===
==== Elimination round ====
===== Team standings =====
Pos	Team	Pld	W	L	Pts	SW	SL	SR	SPW	SPL	SPR	Qualification
1	Letran Lady Knights	9	9	0	18	18	0	MAX	336	223	1.507	Twice-to-beat in the semifinals
2	San Beda Red Lionesses	9	7	2	16	15	8	1.875	417	361	1.155	Twice-to-beat in the semifinals
3	Perpetual Lady Altas	9	6	3	15	14	8	1.750	410	319	1.285	Twice-to-win in the semifinals
4	EAC Lady Generals	9	6	3	15	13	10	1.300	392	381	1.029	Twice-to-win in the semifinals
5	Arellano Lady Chiefs (H)	9	5	4	14	10	8	1.250	328	314	1.045	
6	JRU Lady Bombers	9	5	4	14	12	12	1.000	405	399	1.015	
7	Benilde Lady Blazers	9	3	6	12	8	12	0.667	353	378	0.934	
8	Lyceum Lady Pirates	9	2	7	11	5	14	0.357	288	372	0.774	
9	Mapúa Lady Cardinals	9	1	8	10	7	16	0.438	386	420	0.919	
10	San Sebastian Lady Stags	9	1	8	10	2	17	0.118	253	383	0.661	

Rules for classification: 1) winning percentage; 2) if tied for #2 or #4, one-game playoff; 3) head-to-head record; 4) match points; 5) sets ratio; 6) points ratio
(H) Host

===== Match-up results =====
Team ╲ Game	1	2	3	4	5	6	7	8	9
Arellano	CSB school colors	Letran school colors	JRU school colors	San Beda school colors	Mapua school colors	EAC school colors	Lyceum school colors	UPHD school colors	SSC-R school colors
Letran	JRU school colors	Arellano school colors	Mapua school colors	Lyceum school colors	SSC-R school colors	CSB school colors	San Beda school colors	EAC school colors	UPHD school colors
Benilde	Arellano school colors	SSC-R school colors	San Beda school colors	EAC school colors	UPHD school colors	Letran school colors	JRU school colors	Mapua school colors	Lyceum school colors
EAC	Mapua school colors	Lyceum school colors	SSC-R school colors	CSB school colors	San Beda school colors	Arellano school colors	UPHD school colors	Letran school colors	JRU school colors
JRU	UPHD school colors	Letran school colors	Arellano school colors	Mapua school colors	Lyceum school colors	SSC-R school colors	CSB school colors	San Beda school colors	EAC school colors
Lyceum	San Beda school colors	EAC school colors	UPHD school colors	Letran school colors	JRU school colors	Mapua school colors	Arellano school colors	SSC-R school colors	CSB school colors
Mapúa	EAC school colors	UPHD school colors	Letran school colors	JRU school colors	Arellano school colors	Lyceum school colors	SSC-R school colors	CSB school colors	San Beda school colors
San Beda	Lyceum school colors	SSC-R school colors	CSB school colors	Arellano school colors	EAC school colors	UPHD school colors	Letran school colors	JRU school colors	Mapua school colors
San Sebastian	CSB school colors	San Beda school colors	EAC school colors	UPHD school colors	Letran school colors	JRU school colors	Mapua school colors	Lyceum school colors	Arellano school colors
Perpetual	JRU school colors	Mapua school colors	Lyceum school colors	SSC-R school colors	CSB school colors	San Beda school colors	EAC school colors	Arellano school colors	Letran school colors

= Win; = Loss

===== Game results =====
Results on top and to the right of the solid cells are for first-round games; those to the bottom and to the left of it are second-round games.

Teams	AU	CSJL	CSB	EAC	JRU	LPU	MU	SBU	SSC–R	UPHSD
Arellano Lady Chiefs		0–2	2–0	2–0	2–0	0–2	2–0	0–2	2–0	0–2
Letran Lady Knights			2–0	2–0	2–0	2–0	2–0	2–0	2–0	2–0
Benilde Lady Blazers				1–2	1–2	2–0	2–0	1–2	2–0	0–2
EAC Lady Generals					2–1	2–0	2–1	1–2	2–0	2–1
JRU Lady Bombers						2–1	2–1	2–1	2–0	1–2
Lyceum Lady Pirates							0–2	0–2	2–0	0–2
Mapúa Lady Cardinals								1–2	1–2	1–2
San Beda Red Lionesses									2–0	2–1
San Sebastian Lady Stags										0–2
Perpetual Lady Altas										

Legend: Blue = left column team win; Red = top row team win.

==== Playoffs ====
Semifinals (Nos. 1 & 2 have twice-to-beat advantage)
1	Letran	2
4	EAC	0
2	San Beda	2
3	Perpetual	0

Finals (Knockout)
1	Letran	2
2	San Beda	0
3rd place (Knockout)
4	EAC	2
3	Perpetual	1

==== Semifinals ====
Both Letran and San Beda have the twice-to-beat advantage while they only have to win once, while their opponents twice, to advance to the Finals.

===== Letran vs. EAC =====
28 January 2024	Letran Lady Knights	2–0	EAC Lady Generals	Subic Bay Sand Courts, Olongapo
28 January 2024	(22–20, 21–13)			Subic Bay Sand Courts, Olongapo
28 January 2024	Letran wins series in one game			Subic Bay Sand Courts, Olongapo

===== San Beda vs. Perpetual =====
28 January 2024	San Beda Red Lionesses	2–0	Perpetual Lady Altas	Subic Bay Sand Courts, Olongapo
28 January 2024	(21–18, 21–18)			Subic Bay Sand Courts, Olongapo
28 January 2024	San Beda wins series in one game			Subic Bay Sand Courts, Olongapo

==== Third place playoff ====
===== EAC vs. Perpetual =====
28 January 2024	EAC Lady Generals	2–1	Perpetual Lady Altas	Subic Bay Sand Courts, Olongapo
28 January 2024	(21–16, 16–21, 15–10)			Subic Bay Sand Courts, Olongapo
28 January 2024	EAC wins third place			Subic Bay Sand Courts, Olongapo

==== Finals ====
===== Letran vs. San Beda =====
28 January 2024	Letran Lady Knights	2–0	San Beda Red Lionesses	Subic Bay Sand Courts, Olongapo
28 January 2024	(21–16, 21–16)			Subic Bay Sand Courts, Olongapo
28 January 2024	Letran wins championship			Subic Bay Sand Courts, Olongapo

==== Awards ====
- Most Valuable Player: Gia Marcel Maquilang (Letran Lady Knights)
- Freshman of the Year: Gia Marcel Maquilang (Letran Lady Knights)
- Rookie of the Year: Gia Marcel Maquilang (Letran Lady Knights)
- Coach of the Year: Michael Inoferio (Letran Lady Knights)

=== Juniors' tournament ===
==== Elimination round ====
===== Team standings =====
Pos	Team	Pld	W	L	Pts	SW	SL	SR	SPW	SPL	SPR	Qualification
1	EAC–ICA Brigadiers	8	6	2	14	2	2	1.000	42	45	0.933	Twice-to-beat in the semifinals
2	Lyceum Junior Pirates	8	6	2	14	1	5	0.200	31	35	0.886	Twice-to-beat in the semifinals
3	Letran Squires	8	6	2	14	2	4	0.500	27	31	0.871	Twice-to-win in the semifinals
4	Perpetual Junior Altas	8	6	2	14	2	3	0.667	35	39	0.897	Twice-to-win in the semifinals
5	Arellano Braves (H)	8	4	4	12	3	4	0.750	33	36	0.917	
6	Mapúa Red Robins	8	5	3	13	2	3	0.667	31	37	0.838	
7	San Beda Red Cubs	8	1	7	9	1	6	0.167	32	34	0.941	
8	JRU Light Bombers	8	1	7	9	1	4	0.250	39	49	0.796	
9	La Salle Green Hills Greenies	8	0	8	8	0	8	0.000	29	38	0.763	

Rules for classification: 1) winning percentage; 2) if tied for #2 or #4, one-game playoff; 3) head-to-head record; 4) match points; 5) sets ratio; 6) points ratio
(H) Host

===== Match-up results =====
Team ╲ Game	1	2	3	4	5	6	7	8
Arellano	CSB school colors	Letran school colors	JRU school colors	San Beda school colors	Mapua school colors	EAC school colors	Lyceum school colors	UPHD school colors
Letran	JRU school colors	Arellano school colors	Mapua school colors	Lyceum school colors	CSB school colors	San Beda school colors	EAC school colors	UPHD school colors
EAC–ICA	Mapua school colors	Lyceum school colors	CSB school colors	San Beda school colors	Arellano school colors	UPHD school colors	Letran school colors	JRU school colors
JRU	UPHD school colors	Letran school colors	Arellano school colors	Mapua school colors	Lyceum school colors	CSB school colors	San Beda school colors	EAC school colors
LSGH	Arellano school colors	San Beda school colors	EAC school colors	UPHD school colors	Letran school colors	JRU school colors	Mapua school colors	Lyceum school colors
Lyceum–Cavite	San Beda school colors	EAC school colors	UPHD school colors	Letran school colors	JRU school colors	Mapua school colors	Arellano school colors	CSB school colors
Malayan	EAC school colors	UPHD school colors	Letran school colors	JRU school colors	Arellano school colors	Lyceum school colors	CSB school colors	San Beda school colors
San Beda–Rizal	Lyceum school colors	CSB school colors	Arellano school colors	EAC school colors	UPHD school colors	Letran school colors	JRU school colors	Mapua school colors
Perpetual	JRU school colors	Mapua school colors	Lyceum school colors	CSB school colors	San Beda school colors	EAC school colors	Arellano school colors	Letran school colors

= Win; = Loss

===== Game results =====
Results on top and to the right of the solid cells are for first-round games; those to the bottom and to the left of it are second-round games.

Teams	AU	CSJL	EAC–ICA	JRU	LSGH	LPU–C	MHSS	SBU–R	UPHSD
Arellano Braves		–	–	–	–	1–2	–	–	–
Letran Squires			–	–	–	–	–	–	–
EAC–ICA Brigadiers				–		–	–	–	–
JRU Light Bombers					–	–	–	–	–
La Salle Green Hills Greenies						–	–	–	1–2
Lyceum Junior Pirates							–	–	–
Mapúa Red Robins								–	–
San Beda Red Cubs									–
Perpetual Junior Altas									

Legend: Blue = left column team win; Red = top row team win.

==== Playoffs ====
Semifinals (Nos. 1 & 2 have twice-to-beat advantage)
RD1-text2

Finals (Knockout)
3rd place (Knockout)

==== Semifinals ====
Both EAC–ICA and Lyceum–Cavite have the twice-to-beat advantage while they only have to win once, while their opponents twice, to advance to the Finals.

===== EAC–ICA vs. Perpetual =====
28 January 2024	EAC–ICA Brigadiers	1–2	Perpetual Junior Altas	Subic Bay Sand Courts, Olongapo
28 January 2024	(21–16, 12–21, 8–15)			Subic Bay Sand Courts, Olongapo

28 January 2024	EAC–ICA Brigadiers	2–0	Perpetual Junior Altas	Subic Bay Sand Courts, Olongapo
28 January 2024	(21–17, 21–18)			Subic Bay Sand Courts, Olongapo
28 January 2024	EAC–ICA wins series in two games			Subic Bay Sand Courts, Olongapo

===== Lyceum–Cavite vs. Letran =====
28 January 2024	Lyceum Junior Pirates	2–0	Letran Squires	Subic Bay Sand Courts, Olongapo
28 January 2024	(–, –)			Subic Bay Sand Courts, Olongapo
28 January 2024	Lyceum–Cavite wins series in one game			Subic Bay Sand Courts, Olongapo

==== Third place playoff ====
===== Perpetual vs. Letran =====
28 January 2024	Perpetual Junior Altas	0–2	Letran Squires	Subic Bay Sand Courts, Olongapo
28 January 2024	(19–21, 10–21)			Subic Bay Sand Courts, Olongapo
28 January 2024	Letran wins third place			Subic Bay Sand Courts, Olongapo

==== Finals ====
===== EAC–ICA vs. Lyceum–Cavite =====
28 January 2024	EAC–ICA Brigadiers	2–1	Lyceum Junior Pirates	Subic Bay Sand Courts, Olongapo
28 January 2024	(21–17, 16–21, 15–10)			Subic Bay Sand Courts, Olongapo
28 January 2024	EAC–ICA wins championship			Subic Bay Sand Courts, Olongapo

==== Awards ====
- Most Valuable Player: Alijhan Apdian (EAC–ICA Brigadiers)
- Rookie of the Year: Alijhan Apdian (EAC–ICA Brigadiers)
- Coach of the Year: Rod Palmero (EAC–ICA Brigadiers)

== Chess ==
The NCAA chess championships started on October 28, 2023, and ended on November 30, 2023, at the Colegio de San Juan de Letran campus in Manila.

=== Seniors' tournament ===
==== Elimination round ====
Pos	Team	Game pts	Qualification
1	Perpetual Altas	28.5	Advance to semifinals
2	San Beda Red Lions	25	Advance to semifinals
3	Lyceum Pirates	24.5	Advance to semifinals
4	JRU Heavy Bombers	19.5	Advance to semifinals
5	EAC Generals	16.5	
6	Arellano Chiefs	15.5	
7	Mapúa Cardinals	15 (Note: Match points: Mapua 7, Benilde 4)	
8	Benilde Blazers	15	
9	San Sebastian Stags	11	
10	Letran Knights (H)	9.5	

Source: Chess-results.com
Rules for classification: 1) game points, 2) match points, 3) head-to-head results
(H) Host

==== Playoffs ====
Semifinals
1	Perpetual	2.5
4	JRU	1.5
2	San Beda
3	Lyceum

Finals
1	Perpetual	3.0
2	San Beda	1.0

==== Awards ====
The awards were given on November 30, 2023, at the Saint Thomas Building, Colegio de San Juan de Letran.

- Most Valuable Player: Genesis Mateo Borromeo (Perpetual Altas)
- Rookie of the Year: Joseph Rivera (JRU Heavy Bombers)
- Freshman of the Year: Adrian de Luna (San Beda Red Lions)
- Coach of the Year: Roel Abelgas / Kenneth Rovillos (Perpetual Altas)

=== Juniors' tournament ===
==== Elimination round ====
Pos	Team	Game pts	Qualification
1	Lyceum Junior Pirates	25	Advance to semifinals
2	Perpetual Junior Altas	22	Advance to semifinals
3	Arellano Braves	19	Advance to semifinals
4	San Beda Red Cubs	16.5	Advance to semifinals
5	Mapúa Red Robins	16	
6	San Sebastian Staglets	13.5	
7	JRU Light Bombers	12.5	
8	EAC–ICA Brigadiers	10	
9	La Salle Green Hills Greenies	9.5	

Source: Chess-results.com
Rules for classification: 1) game points, 2) match points, 3) head-to-head results

==== Playoffs ====
Semifinals
1	Lyceum–Cavite
4	San Beda–Rizal
2	Perpetual	3.5
3	Arellano	0.5

Finals
1	Lyceum–Cavite	2.5
2	Perpetual	1.5

==== Awards ====
The awards were given on November 30, 2023, at the Saint Thomas Building, Colegio de San Juan de Letran.

- Most Valuable Player: Angele Bigte (Lyceum Junior Pirates)
- Rookie of the Year: Welsey Magbanua (Perpetual Junior Altas)
- Freshman of the Year: Alexis Saballe (San Sebastian Staglets)
- Coach of the Year: Emerson Sayaman (Lyceum Junior Pirates)

== Football ==
The seniors' NCAA football championship started on February 19, 2024, at the Rizal Memorial Stadium in Manila.

=== Seniors' tournament ===
==== Elimination round ====
===== First round =====
====== Team standings ======
Pos	Team	Pld	W	D	L	GF	GA	GD	Pts	Qualification
1	Benilde Strikers	3	2	1	0	8	1	+7	7	Advance to the Finals
2	San Beda Red Booters (H)	3	2	0	1	16	1	+15	6	
3	EAC Generals	3	0	2	1	2	7	−5	2	
4	Mapúa Cardinals	3	0	1	2	1	18	−17	1	

(H) Hosts

====== Match-up results ======
Team ╲ Game	1	2	3
Benilde	Mapua school colors	EAC school colors	San Beda school colors
EAC	San Beda school colors	CSB school colors	Mapua school colors
Mapúa	CSB school colors	San Beda school colors	EAC school colors
San Beda	EAC school colors	Mapua school colors	CSB school colors

= Win; = Draw; = Loss

====== Scores ======
Team	CSB	EAC	MU	SBU
Benilde Strikers		1–1	6–0	1–0
EAC Generals			1–1	0–5
Mapúa Cardinals				0–11
San Beda Red Booters				

Legend: Blue = left column team win; Yellow = draw; Red = top row team win.

===== Second round =====
====== Team standings ======
Pos	Team	Pld	W	D	L	GF	GA	GD	Pts	Qualification
1	San Beda Red Booters (H)	3	3	0	0	10	0	+10	9	Advance to the Finals
2	Benilde Strikers	3	2	0	1	9	2	+7	6	
3	EAC Generals	3	1	0	2	7	8	−1	3	
4	Mapúa Cardinals	3	0	0	3	1	17	−16	0	

(H) Hosts

====== Match-up results ======
Team ╲ Game	1	2	3
Benilde	Mapua school colors	EAC school colors	San Beda school colors
EAC	San Beda school colors	CSB school colors	Mapua school colors
Mapúa	CSB school colors	San Beda school colors	EAC school colors
San Beda	EAC school colors	Mapua school colors	CSB school colors

= Win; = Draw; = Loss

====== Scores ======
Team	CSB	EAC	MU	SBU
Benilde Strikers		4–1	5–0	0–1
EAC Generals			6–1	0–3
Mapúa Cardinals				0–6
San Beda Red Booters				

Legend: Blue = left column team win; Yellow = draw; Red = top row team win.

===== Overall team standings =====
Pos	Team	Pld	W	D	L	GF	GA	GD	Pts	Qualification
1	San Beda Red Booters (H)	6	5	0	1	26	1	+25	15	Advance to the Finals
2	Benilde Strikers	6	4	1	1	17	3	+14	13	Advance to the Finals
3	EAC Generals	6	1	2	3	9	15	−6	5	
4	Mapúa Cardinals	6	0	1	5	2	35	−33	1	

(H) Hosts

==== Finals ====
March 11, 2024
4:00pm

Benilde Strikers	0–1	San Beda Red Booters
	Report	Amir Aningalan 90+3'

Rizal Memorial Stadium, Manila
Attendance: 2,550
- Finals Most Valuable Player: Amir Aningalan (San Beda Red Lions)

==== Awards ====
The following were the award winners:

- Most Valuable Player: Amir Aningalan (San Beda Red Lions)
- Rookie of the Year: Kirk Eman See (San Beda Red Lions)
- Freshman of the Year: Kirvy Tabelin (San Beda Red Lions)
- Best Striker: Kirk Eman See (San Beda Red Lions)
- Best Midfielder: Jancee Blerr Borja (Benilde Blazers)
- Best Defender: Eldwin Escosora (San Beda Red Lions)
- Best Goalkeeper: John Betanio (San Beda Red Lions)
- Fair Play Award: Mapúa Cardinals
- Coach of the Year: Christopher "Nhiboy" Pedimonte (San Beda Red Lions)

== Lawn tennis ==
The NCAA lawn tennis championships started on March 15, 2024, until March 23, 2024, at the Philippine Columbian Association Sports Club in Paco, Manila.

=== Men's tournament ===
==== Elimination round ====
===== Team standings =====
Pos	Team	Pld	W	L
1	Benilde Blazing Netters	8	8	0
2	San Beda Red Netters	8	7	1
3	Mapúa Cardinals	8	6	2
4	Perpetual Altas	8	0	8

Updated to match(es) played on March 15, 2024. Source:
Rules for classification: 1) winning percentage; 2) if tied for #2 or #4, one-game playoff; 3) head-to-head record; 4) match points; 5) sets ratio; 6) points ratio

===== Match-up results =====
	Round 1			Round 2		
Team ╲ Game	1	2	3	4	5	6
Benilde	Mapua school colors	San Beda school colors	UPHD school colors	San Beda school colors	Mapua school colors	UPHD school colors
Mapúa	CSB school colors	UPHD school colors	San Beda school colors	CSB school colors	UPHD school colors	San Beda school colors
San Beda	UPHD school colors	CSB school colors	Mapua school colors	CSB school colors	UPHD school colors	Mapua school colors
Perpetual	San Beda school colors	Mapua school colors	CSB school colors	Mapua school colors	San Beda school colors	CSB school colors

Updated to match(es) played on March 15, 2024. Source:
= Win; = Loss

===== Game results =====
Results on top and to the right of the solid cells are for first-round games; those to the bottom and to the left of it are second-round games.

Teams	CSB	MU	SBU	UPHSD
Benilde Blazing Netters		3–0	3–0	3–0
Mapúa Cardinals			3–0	3–0
San Beda Red Netters				2–1
Perpetual Altas				

Updated to match(es) played on March 15, 2024. Source:
Legend: Blue = left column team win; Red = top row team win.

=== Women's tournament ===
==== Elimination round ====
===== Team standings =====
Pos	Team	Pld	W	L
1	Benilde Lady Netters	1	1	0
2	San Beda Red Netters	1	1	0
3	Mapúa Lady Cardinals	1	0	1
4	Perpetual Lady Altas	1	0	1

Updated to match(es) played on March 15, 2024. Source:
Rules for classification: 1) winning percentage; 2) if tied for #2 or #4, one-game playoff; 3) head-to-head record; 4) match points; 5) sets ratio; 6) points ratio

===== Match-up results =====
	Round 1			Round 2		
Team ╲ Game	1	2	3	4	5	6
Benilde	UPHD school colors	Mapua school colors	San Beda school colors			
Mapúa	San Beda school colors	CSB school colors	UPHD school colors			
San Beda	Mapua school colors	UPHD school colors	CSB school colors			
Perpetual	CSB school colors	San Beda school colors	Mapua school colors			

Updated to match(es) played on March 15, 2024. Source:
= Win; = Loss

===== Game results =====
Results on top and to the right of the solid cells are for first-round games; those to the bottom and to the left of it are second-round games.

Teams	CSB	MU	SBU	UPHSD
Benilde Lady Netters		–	–	3–0
Mapúa Lady Cardinals			0–3	–
San Beda Lady Red Netters				–
Perpetual Lady Altas				

Updated to match(es) played on March 15, 2024. Source:
Legend: Blue = left column team win; Red = top row team win.

== Swimming ==
The San Beda Red Lions and Red Lionesses won their respective 20-peat and 10-peat swimming championships held at the Teofilo Yldefonso Swimming Pool, Rizal Memorial Sports Complex, Manila. The Benilde Blazers and Perpetual Altas finished second and third, respectively, in the men's and women's tournament. The LSGH Greenies were hailed as the 3-peat champions in the junior's division, while the San Beda Red Cubs and Letran Squires garnered 1st runner up and 2nd runner up respectively.

Rank	Men's division	Score	Rank	Women's division	Score	Rank	Junior's division	Score
1st place, gold medalist(s)	San Beda Red Lions	1,380	1st place, gold medalist(s)	San Beda Red Lionesses	1,526.50	1st place, gold medalist(s)	La Salle Green Hills Greenies	1,025.50
2nd place, silver medalist(s)	Benilde Blazers	725.75	2nd place, silver medalist(s)	Benilde Lady Blazers	473	2nd place, silver medalist(s)	San Beda Red Cubs	978.50
3rd place, bronze medalist(s)	Perpetual Altas	430.50	3rd place, bronze medalist(s)	Perpetual Lady Altas	279.50	3rd place, bronze medalist(s)	Letran Squires	492.50

== Table tennis ==
The NCAA table tennis championships started on January 29, 2024, until February 1, 2024, at the Emilio Aguinaldo College Gymnasium in Manila.

=== Men's tournament ===
==== Elimination round ====
===== Team standings =====
Pos	Team	Pld	W	L	Qualification
1	Benilde Blazers	5	5	0	Twice-to-beat in the semifinals
2	San Beda Red Lions	5	4	1	Twice-to-beat in the semifinals
3	Perpetual Altas	5	3	2	Twice-to-win in the semifinals
4	Mapúa Cardinals (H)	5	2	3	Twice-to-win in the semifinals
5	JRU Heavy Bombers	5	1	4	
6	EAC Generals	5	0	5	

Source: NCAA Table Tennis Live Stats
Rules for classification: 1) winning percentage; 2) if tied for #2 or #4, one-game playoff; 3) head-to-head record; 4) match points; 5) sets ratio; 6) points ratio
(H) Hosts

===== Match-up results =====
Team ╲ Game	1	2	3	4	5
Benilde	Mapua school colors	UPHD school colors	EAC school colors	San Beda school colors	JRU school colors
EAC	UPHD school colors	San Beda school colors	CSB school colors	JRU school colors	Mapua school colors
JRU	San Beda school colors	Mapua school colors	UPHD school colors	EAC school colors	CSB school colors
Mapúa	CSB school colors	JRU school colors	San Beda school colors	UPHD school colors	EAC school colors
San Beda	JRU school colors	EAC school colors	Mapua school colors	CSB school colors	UPHD school colors
Perpetual	EAC school colors	CSB school colors	JRU school colors	Mapua school colors	San Beda school colors

Source: NCAA Table Tennis Live Stats
= Win; = Loss

===== Game results =====
Results on top and to the right of the solid cells are for first-round games; those to the bottom and to the left of it are second-round games.

Teams	CSB	EAC	JRU	MU	SBU	UPHSD
Benilde Blazers		3–0	3–0	3–0	3–0	3–1
EAC Generals			0–3	0–3	0–3	0–3
JRU Heavy Bombers				0–3	0–3	0–3
Mapúa Cardinals					0–3	2–3
San Beda Red Lions						3–1
Perpetual Altas						

Source: NCAA Table Tennis Live Stats
Legend: Blue = left column team win; Red = top row team win.

==== Playoffs ====
Semifinals (Nos. 1 & 2 have twice-to-beat advantage)
RD1-text2

Finals (Knockout)
3rd place (Knockout)

==== Semifinals ====
Both Benilde and San Beda have the twice-to-beat advantage while they only have to win once, while their opponents twice, to advance to the Finals.

===== (1) Benilde vs. (4) Mapúa =====
31 January 2024	Benilde Blazers	3–0	Mapúa Cardinals	EAC Gymnasium, Manila

	Individual matches
Deocareza, James Angelo P.	3–0	Mallen, Raul III	11–5, 11–4, 5–11, 11–8
Lucero, Henze Dominique C.	3–0	Tallorin, Rondell Jay	11–6, 11–6, 11–6
Laudatom Neo Angelo D./Lucero, Henze Dominique C.	3–0	Crescini, Mark John/Quilantip, Jericho Jed	11–4, 11–8, 11–4

Benilde wins series in one game

===== (2) San Beda vs. (3) Perpetual =====
31 January 2024	San Beda Red Lions	3–1	Perpetual Altas	EAC Gymnasium, Manila

	Individual matches
Ramos, math Andrew S.	3–0	Memoria, Ken Andrei D.	11–6, 11–4, 11–6
Mercado, Peterkarlsson M.	0–3	Chin, Kenneth Ivan R.	10–12, 8–11, 9–11
Garcia, Aisiah G./Tolentino, Earl Lawrence L.	3–0	Belen, Rastel Mar B./Sarmiento, Lloyd Gabrielle L.	11–9, 11–7, 11–8
Ramos, math Andrew S.	3–2	Chin, Kenneth Ivan R.	11–8, 10–12, 11–2, 8–11, 10–4

San Beda wins series in one game

==== Third place playoff ====
1 February 2024	Mapúa Cardinals	0–3	Perpetual Altas	EAC Gymnasium, Manila

	Individual matches
Mallen, Raul III	1–3	Chin, Kenneth Ivan R.	9–11, 11–6, 4–11, 12–14
Lapitan, Hanz Jared	0–3	Memoria, Ken Andrei D.	10–12, 14–16, 6–11
Quilantip, Jericho Jed/Crescini, Mark John	0–3	Sarmiento, Lloyd Gabrielle L./Belen, Rastel Mar B.	10–12, 6–11, 6–11

Perpetual wins third place

==== Finals ====
1 February 2024	Benilde Blazers	3–1	San Beda Red Lions	EAC Gymnasium, Manila

	Individual matches
Deocareza, James Angelo P.	1–3	Ramos, math Andrew S.	3–11, 8–11, 11–7, 8–11
Lucero, Henze Dominique C.	3–1	Mercado, Peterkarlsson M.	11–7, 12–14, 11–1, 11–5
Laudatom Neo Angelo D./Lim, Charles Joshua T.	3–0	Garcia, Aisiah G./Tolentino, Earl Lawrence L.	11–4, 11–5, 11–7
Lucero, Henze Dominique C.	3–0	Ramos, math Andrew S.	11–7, 11–3, 11–7

Benilde wins championship

==== Awards ====
- Most Valuable Player: Henze Dominique C. Lucero (Benilde Blazers)
- Rookie of the Year: Henze Dominique C. Lucero (Benilde Blazers)
- Freshman of the Year: Raul Mallen III (Mapúa Cardinals)
- Coach of the Year: Bong Palermo (Benilde Blazers)

=== Women's tournament ===
==== Elimination round ====
===== Team standings =====
Pos	Team	Pld	W	L	Qualification
1	Perpetual Lady Altas	4	3	1	Twice-to-beat in the semifinals
2	San Beda Red Lionesses	4	3	1	Twice-to-beat in the semifinals
3	Benilde Lady Blazers	4	3	1	Twice-to-win in the semifinals
4	EAC Lady Generals	4	1	3	Twice-to-win in the semifinals
5	Mapúa Lady Cardinals (H)	4	0	4	

Source: NCAA Table Tennis Live Stats
Rules for classification: 1) winning percentage; 2) if tied for #2 or #4, one-game playoff; 3) head-to-head record; 4) match points; 5) sets ratio; 6) points ratio
(H) Hosts

===== Match-up results =====
Team ╲ Game	1	2	3	4
Benilde	UPHD school colors	San Beda school colors	Mapua school colors	EAC school colors
EAC	UPHD school colors	San Beda school colors	Mapua school colors	CSB school colors
Mapúa	San Beda school colors	CSB school colors	EAC school colors	UPHD school colors
San Beda	Mapua school colors	CSB school colors	EAC school colors	UPHD school colors
Perpetual	CSB school colors	EAC school colors	San Beda school colors	Mapua school colors

Source: NCAA Table Tennis Live Stats
= Win; = Loss

===== Game results =====
Results on top and to the right of the solid cells are for first-round games; those to the bottom and to the left of it are second-round games.

Teams	CSB	EAC	MU	SBU	UPHSD
Benilde Blazers		3–0	3–0	1–3	3–2
EAC Generals			3–1	0–3	0–3
Mapúa Cardinals				0–3	0–3
San Beda Red Lions					1–3
Perpetual Altas					

Source: NCAA Table Tennis Live Stats
Legend: Blue = left column team win; Red = top row team win.

==== Playoffs ====
Semifinals (Nos. 1 & 2 have twice-to-beat advantage)
RD1-text2

Finals (Knockout)
3rd place (Knockout)

==== Semifinals ====
Both Perpetual and San Beda have the twice-to-beat advantage while they only have to win once, while their opponents twice, to advance to the Finals.

===== (1) Perpetual vs. (4) EAC =====
31 January 2024	Perpetual Lady Altas	3–0	EAC Lady Generals	EAC Gymnasium, Manila

	Individual matches
Santillan, Chrishien Mae N.	3–1	Fresco, Naomie Chantal C.	11–7, 11–8, 10–12, 11–5
Ablaza, Keziah Bien Y.	3–0	Tado, Shane Joanna D.	11–1, 11–6, 11–8
Lucas, Patricia R./Plurad, Trisha Mae D.	3–1	Lentic Beatrice Joanna D./Neri, Radica M.	11–9, 11–7, 18–20, 11–8

Perpetual wins series in one game

===== (2) San Beda vs. (3) Benilde =====
31 January 2024	San Beda Red Lionesses	3–0	Benilde Lady Blazers	EAC Gymnasium, Manila

	Individual matches
Solis, Audrey Lyn Faye M.	3–0	Peralta, Marianne Joyce S.	11–6, 11–4, 11–8
Chavez, Angelyn Joy S.	3–2	Reyes, Alexandra Dominique P.	11–5, 11–9, 6–11, 12–14, 11–1
Digamon, Novy Mae S./Valencia, Jailyn R.	3–1	Manalo, Stephanie S./Marcelo, Danielle B.	11–7, 11–3, 8–11, 11–8

San Beda wins series in one game

==== Third place playoff ====
1 February 2024	EAC Lady Generals	2–3	Benilde Lady Blazers	EAC Gymnasium, Manila

	Individual matches
Tado, Shane Joanna D.	0–3	Reyes, Alexandra Dominique P.	4–11, 6–11, 7–11
Fresco, Naomie Chantal C.	3–2	Marcelo, Danielle B.	11–8, 7–11, 11–7, 10–12, 14–12
Neri, Radica M./Lentic Beatrice Joanna D.	3–0	Veluz, Jules Ashley L./Villa, Neilrose Ricci Q.	11–9, 12–10, 15–13
Fresco, Naomie Chantal C.	0–3	Reyes, Alexandra Dominique P.	7–11, 9–11, 1–11
Tado, Shane Joanna D.	0–3	Marcelo, Danielle B.	8–11, 10–12, 10–12

Benilde wins third place

==== Finals ====
1 February 2024	Perpetual Lady Altas	3–2	San Beda Red Lionesses	EAC Gymnasium, Manila

	Individual matches
Ablaza, Keziah Bien Y.	2–3	Solis, Audrey Lyn Faye M.	11–9, 11–5, 9–11, 5–11, 5–11
Santillan, Chrishien Mae N.	3–1	Chavez, Angelyn Joy S.	11–6, 11–13, 11–7, 11–9
Bocala, Zada Marie T./Lucas, Patricia R.	2–3	Digamon, Novy Mae S./Valencia, Jailyn R.	4–11, 11–9, 9–11, 11–8, 3–11
Santillan, Chrishien Mae N.	3–1	Solis, Audrey Lyn Faye M.	11–7, 11–4, 8–11, 11–7
Ablaza, Keziah Bien Y.	3–1	Chavez, Angelyn Joy S.	10–12, 11–9, 11–7, 11–8

Perpetual wins championship

==== Awards ====
- Most Valuable Player: Santillan, Chrishien Mae N. (Perpetual Lady Altas)
- Rookie of the Year: Santillan, Chrishien Mae N. (Perpetual Lady Altas)
- Freshman of the Year: Santillan, Chrishien Mae N. (Perpetual Lady Altas)
- Coach of the Year: Kirby Collis (Perpetual Lady Altas)

=== Juniors' tournament ===
==== Elimination round ====
===== Team standings =====
Pos	Team	Pld	W	L	Qualification
1	Perpetual Junior Altas	5	5	0	Twice-to-beat in the semifinals
2	San Beda Red Cubs	5	4	1	Twice-to-beat in the semifinals
3	JRU Light Bombers	5	3	2	Twice-to-win in the semifinals
4	EAC–ICA Brigadiers	5	2	3	Twice-to-win in the semifinals
5	Mapúa Red Robins (H)	5	1	4	
6	La Salle Green Hills Greenies	5	0	5	

Source: NCAA Table Tennis Live Stats
Rules for classification: 1) winning percentage; 2) if tied for #2 or #4, one-game playoff; 3) head-to-head record; 4) match points; 5) sets ratio; 6) points ratio
(H) Hosts

===== Match-up results =====
Team ╲ Game	1	2	3	4	5
EAC–ICA	UPHD school colors	San Beda school colors	JRU school colors	CSB school colors	Mapua school colors
JRU	Mapua school colors	UPHD school colors	EAC school colors	San Beda school colors	CSB school colors
LSGH	San Beda school colors	Mapua school colors	UPHD school colors	EAC school colors	JRU school colors
Malayan	JRU school colors	CSB school colors	San Beda school colors	UPHD school colors	EAC school colors
San Beda–Rizal	CSB school colors	EAC school colors	Mapua school colors	JRU school colors	UPHD school colors
Perpetual	EAC school colors	JRU school colors	CSB school colors	Mapua school colors	San Beda school colors

Source: NCAA Table Tennis Live Stats
= Win; = Loss

===== Game results =====
Results on top and to the right of the solid cells are for first-round games; those to the bottom and to the left of it are second-round games.

Teams	EAC–ICA	JRU	LSGH	MHSS	SBU–R	UPHSD
EAC–ICA Brigadiers		0–3	3–0	3–1	0–3	0–3
JRU Light Bombers			3–0	3–1	0–3	1–3
La Salle Green Hills Greenies				1–3	0–3	0–3
Mapúa Red Robins					0–3	0–3
San Beda Red Cubs						1–3
Perpetual Junior Altas						

Source: NCAA Table Tennis Live Stats
Legend: Blue = left column team win; Red = top row team win.

==== Playoffs ====
Semifinals (Nos. 1 & 2 have twice-to-beat advantage)
RD1-text2

Finals (Knockout)
3rd place (Knockout)

==== Semifinals ====
Both Perpetual and San Beda–Rizal have the twice-to-beat advantage while they only have to win once, while their opponents twice, to advance to the Finals.

===== (1) Perpetual vs. (4) EAC–ICA =====
31 January 2024	Perpetual Junior Altas	3–1	EAC–ICA Brigadiers	EAC Gymnasium, Manila

	Individual matches
Aguilar, Gerald V.	3–0	Ancheta, James Dylan A.	11–7, 11–4, 11–1
Amata, John Gabriel R.	2–3	Acon, Robie G.	11–7, 11–7, 9–11, 7–11, 8–11
Crom, James Michael P./Luna, Russel S.	3–0	Lazo, Jerzel Benedict D./Vergel, Johndale A.	11–6, 11–4, 11–5
Aguilar, Gerald V.	3–0	Acon, Robie G.	11–6, 11–5, 11–8

Perpetual wins series in one game

===== (2) San Beda–Rizal vs. (3) JRU =====
31 January 2024	San Beda Red Cubs	3–0	JRU Light Bombers	EAC Gymnasium, Manila

	Individual matches
Ong, Andre John A.	3–0	Marabe, Dominic D.	11–5, 11–9, 11–4
Amarillo III, Virgilio Manuel V.	3–1	Abirin, Sharif Zhaifur D.	11–6, 5–11, 11–3, 11–8
Reyes, Dustin N./Tuazon, Gavin Nathan P.	3–0	Cortez, Ian Kevin O./Mendoza, Carl Jorge M.	11–7, 11–3, 11–6

San Beda–Rizal wins series in one game

==== Third place playoff ====
1 February 2024	EAC–ICA Brigadiers	2–3	JRU Light Bombers	EAC Gymnasium, Manila

	Individual matches
Acon, Robie G.	3–1	Marabe, Dominic D.	11–6, 6–11, 11–7, 11–6
Ancheta, James Dylan A.	0–3	Abirin, Sharif Zhaifur D.	7–11, 8–11, 7–11
Lazo, Jerzel Benedict D./Vergel, Johndale A.	3–0	Cortez, Ian Kevin O./Mendoza, Carl Jorge M.	12–10, 11–6, 11–7
Acon, Robie G.	0–3	Abirin, Sharif Zhaifur D.	7–11, 9–11, 8–11
Ancheta, James Dylan A.	1–3	Marabe, Dominic D.	5–11, 11–9, 6–11, 6–11

JRU wins third place

==== Finals ====
1 February 2024	Perpetual Junior Altas	3–1	San Beda Red Cubs	EAC Gymnasium, Manila

	Individual matches
Aguilar, Gerald V.	3–0	Amarillo III, Virgilio Manuel V.	11–9, 11–6, 11–3
Amata, John Gabriel R.	1–3	Ong, Andre John A.	7–11, 11–8, 10–12, 6–11
Crom, James Michael P./Luna, Russel S.	3–0	Reyes, Dustin N./Tuazon, Gavin Nathan P.	12–10, 11–7, 11–9
Aguilar, Gerald V.	3–1	Ong, Andre John A.	11–3, 16–14, 8–11, 11–6

Perpetual wins championship

==== Awards ====
- Most Valuable Player: Aguilar, Gerald V. (Perpetual Junior Altas)
- Rookie of the Year: Aguilar, Gerald V. (Perpetual Junior Altas)
- Coach of the Year: Kirby Collis (Perpetual Junior Altas)

== Taekwondo ==
The NCAA taekwondo championships started on November 15, 2023. The Ayala Malls Manila Bay Activity Center in Parañaque is the venue of the tournament. San Beda emerged victorious in the men's, women's, and juniors tournaments.

=== Men's tournament ===
==== Standings ====
Rank	Team	Score
1st place, gold medalist(s)	San Beda Red Lions	91
2nd place, silver medalist(s)	Benilde Blazers	88
3rd place, bronze medalist(s)	Arellano Chiefs	59
4	EAC Generals	39
5	Letran Knights	8
6	JRU Heavy Bombers	4

==== Awards ====
- Most Valuable Player: Jaybe Bermudez (San Beda Red Lions)
- Coach of the Year: Jayson Locsin (San Beda Red Lions)
- Rookie of the Year: Kian Ashe (Benilde Blazers)
- Freshman of the Year: Christian Bañez (EAC Generals)

=== Women's tournament ===
==== Standings ====
Rank	Team	Score
1st place, gold medalist(s)	San Beda Red Lionesses	112
2nd place, silver medalist(s)	Benilde Lady Blazers	80
3rd place, bronze medalist(s)	Arellano Lady Chiefs	42
4	EAC Lady Generals	35
5	Letran Lady Knights	3
6	JRU Lady Bombers	0

==== Awards ====
- Most Valuable Player: Katrina Mariano (San Beda Red Lionesses)
- Coach of the Year: Abram Cuvinar (San Beda Red Lionesses)
- Rookie of the Year: Claire Ysshabelle Blanco (San Beda Red Lionesses)
- Freshman of the Year: Rica Antonares (San Beda Red Lionesses)

=== Juniors' tournament ===
==== Standings ====
Rank	Team	Score
1st place, gold medalist(s)	San Beda Red Cubs	122
2nd place, silver medalist(s)	Arellano Braves	111
3rd place, bronze medalist(s)	EAC–ICA Brigadiers	45
4	La Salle Green Hills Greenies	38
5	JRU Light Bombers	3
6	Letran Squires	2

==== Awards ====
- Most Valuable Player: Von Lawrence Saño (San Beda Red Cubs)
- Coach of the Year: Ralph Magno (San Beda Red Cubs)
- Rookie of the Year: Felix Ace Perez (San Beda Red Cubs)

== Cheerleading ==
The NCAA Cheerleading Competition will be held on June 19, 2024, at the Filoil EcoOil Centre.

=== Team standings ===
Rank	Team	Order	Tumbling	Stunts	Tosses	Pyramids	Dance	Penalties	Points	Percentage
1st place, gold medalist(s)	AU Chiefsquad	2						0	253.50	84.50%
2nd place, silver medalist(s)	Altas Perpsquad	6						0	231.50	77%
3rd place, bronze medalist(s)	Letran Cheering Squad	5						0	206.00	68.67%
4	Mapúa Cheerping Cardinals	1						0	0	0%
5	San Beda Red Corps	7						0	0	0%
5	Benilde Blazers Pep Squad	10						0	0	0%
7	EAC Generals Pep Squad	9						0	0	0%
8	Golden Stags Cheerleading Squad	4						0	0	0%
9	JRU Pep Squad	8						0	0	0%
10	LPU Pirates Pep Squad	3						0	0	0%

=== Awards ===
NCAA Season 99 cheerleading champions
Arellano Chiefs
Sixth title, fifth consecutive title

== General championship summary ==
=== Medal tables ===
==== Seniors' division ====
Rank	Team	Gold	Silver	Bronze	Total
1	San Beda University	7	5	2	14
2	University of Perpetual Help System DALTA	5	0	3	8
3	De La Salle–College of Saint Benilde	3	7	4	14
4	José Rizal University*	2	0	1	3
5	Colegio de San Juan de Letran	1	1	1	3
6	San Sebastian College–Recoletos	1	1	0	2
7	Mapúa University	0	4	1	5
8	Emilio Aguinaldo College	0	1	2	3
9	Arellano University	0	0	3	3
10	Lyceum of the Philippines University	0	0	2	2
Totals (10 entries)		19	19	19	57

* Host nation (Season host); General champions
Notes: Results are final.

==== Juniors' division ====
Rank	Team	Gold	Silver	Bronze	Total
1	University of Perpetual Help System DALTA	4	2	1	7
2	San Beda University–Rizal	1	4	1	6
3	Arellano University	1	3	2	6
4	La Salle Green Hills	1	1	0	2
4	Lyceum of the Philippines University–Cavite	1	1	0	2
6	Colegio de San Juan de Letran	1	0	2	3
6	EAC–Immaculate Conception Academy	1	0	2	3
6	Malayan High School of Science	1	0	2	3
9	San Sebastian College–Recoletos	1	0	1	2
10	José Rizal University*	0	1	1	2
Totals (10 entries)		12	12	12	36

* Host nation (Season host); General champions
Notes: Results are final.

=== General championship tally ===
==== Seniors' division ====
		Basketball	3x3 basketball	Volleyball (indoor)		Volleyball (beach)		Swimming		Chess	Tennis	Soft tennis	Table tennis		Badminton		Taekwondo		Football	Athletics	Total		
Rank	Team	M	M	M	W	M	W	M	W	M	M	W	M	W	M	W	M	W	M	M	M	W	Overall
1	San Beda	50	30	20	15	8	40	50	50	40	35	35	40	40	50	40	50	50	50	—	423	270	693
2	Benilde	35	35	25	50	25	15	40	40	10	50	40	50	35	40	35	40	40	40	—	390	255	645
3	Perpetual	25	6	50	20	50	30	35	35	50	30	50	35	50	—	—	—	—	—	—	281	185	466
4	Mapúa	40	25	10	25	40	8	25	10	15	40	30	30	25	35	25	—	—	30	40	330	123	453
5	EAC	15	8	40	6	15	35	6	25	25	—	—	20	30	20	20	30	30	35	—	214	146	360
6	Arellano	6	10	30	30	30	25	15	8	20	—	—	—	—	—	—	35	35	—	35	181	98	279
7	JRU (H)	20	50	8	8	35	20	8	6	30	—	—	25	—	—	—	—	—	—	50	226	34	260
8	Letran	8	20	35	40	10	50	30	30	6	—	—	—	—	—	—	—	—	—	—	109	120	229
9	San Sebastian	10	40	15	10	20	6	20	15	8	—	—	—	—	30	50	—	—	—	—	143	81	224
10	Lyceum	30	15	6	35	6	10	10	20	35	—	—	—	—	25	30	—	—	—	—	127	95	222

(H) Season host; = Champion; = Runner-up; = Third place; — = No team.
Notes: Results are final.

==== Juniors' division ====
		Basketball		3x3 basketball	Volleyball (indoor)		Volleyball (beach)	Swimming	Chess	Table tennis	Badminton	Taekwondo	Athletics	Total		
Rank	Team	B	K	B	B	G	B	B	B	B	B	B	B	B	G	Overall
1	Perpetual	40	—	50	35	50	30	25	40	50	—	—	50	320	50	370
2	SBU–R	25	40	35	15	—	15	40	30	40	40	50	—	290	0	330
3	Arellano	6	50	20	40	40	25	—	35	—	—	40	35	201	40	291
4	Malayan	35	15	15	50	—	20	8	25	25	35	—	—	213	0	228
5	LSGH	15	25	40	8	20	8	50	8	20	30	—	—	179	20	224
5	LPU–C	8	30	6	30	30	40	30	50	—	—	—	—	164	30	224
7	EAC–ICA	20	—	8	20	35	50	15	10	30	—	35	—	188	35	223
8	JRU (H)	10	10	30	10	25	10	10	15	35	—	—	40	160	25	195
9	San Sebastian	30	35	25	—	—	—	20	20	—	50	—	—	145	0	180
10	Letran	50	20	10	25	—	35	35	—	—	—	—	—	155	0	175

(H) Season host; = Champion; = Runner-up; = Third place; — = No team.
Notes: Results are final.

== See also ==
- UAAP Season 86
