= UAAP taekwondo championships =

Taekwondo competition

The University Athletic Association of the Philippines (UAAP) taekwondo tournament was held before in the second semester of the academic year. However, when the UAAP Board transferred the volleyball tournament to the second semester in Season 69 (school year 2006–2007), Taekwondo was one of the second semester sports that was moved to the first semester.

== History ==
The first UAAP Taekwondo Tournament was held during Season 50 (1987–88), with UST sweeping the tournament with a 6–0 win–loss card. National University did not field a team during the first tournament.

== List of UAAP taekwondo champions (kyorugi and poomsae) ==
Triple Championships:

- Denotes school won the championship in three divisions in the same year

Double Championships:

- Won the men's and women's championships
- Won the men's and juniors'/high school championships
- Won the women's and juniors'/high school championships

Demonstration sport:

- Fewer than four teams participating

UAAP Season	Taekwondo Kyorugi			Taekwondo Poomsae
UAAP Season	High school (Juniors' before Season 82)	Men's	Women's	Taekwondo Poomsae
60 (1997–98)	—N/a	De La Salle University	De La Salle University	—N/a
61 (1998–99)	—N/a	De La Salle University	De La Salle University	—N/a
62 (1999–00)	Ateneo de Manila University	University of Santo Tomas	University of Santo Tomas	—N/a
63 (2000–01)	Ateneo de Manila University	De La Salle University	De La Salle University	—N/a
64 (2001–02)	Ateneo de Manila University	De La Salle University	University of Santo Tomas	—N/a
65 (2002–03)	University of Santo Tomas	University of Santo Tomas	University of Santo Tomas	—N/a
66 (2003–04)	University of Santo Tomas	University of Santo Tomas	University of Santo Tomas	—N/a
67 (2004–05)	University of Santo Tomas	University of Santo Tomas	University of Santo Tomas	—N/a
68 (2005–06)	University of Santo Tomas	University of Santo Tomas	University of Santo Tomas	—N/a
69 (2006–07)	University of Santo Tomas	University of Santo Tomas	University of Santo Tomas	—N/a
70 (2007–08)	University of Santo Tomas	University of Santo Tomas	Far Eastern University	—N/a
71 (2008–09)	University of the East	University of Santo Tomas	University of Santo Tomas	—N/a
72 (2009–10)	University of Santo Tomas	Far Eastern University	University of Santo Tomas	—N/a
73 (2010–11)	University of Santo Tomas	De La Salle University	University of Santo Tomas	—N/a
74 (2011–12)	University of Santo Tomas	University of Santo Tomas	Far Eastern University	University of Santo Tomas
75 (2012–13)	University of Santo Tomas	University of Santo Tomas	De La Salle University	University of Santo Tomas
76 (2013–14)	University of the East	De La Salle University	University of Santo Tomas	University of Santo Tomas
77 (2014–15)	University of the East	University of Santo Tomas	University of the Philippines Diliman	University of the Philippines Diliman
78 (2015–16)	University of the East	University of Santo Tomas	University of the East	University of Santo Tomas
79 (2016–17)	University of the East	University of Santo Tomas	National University	De La Salle University
80 (2017–18)	University of Santo Tomas	National University	National University	University of Santo Tomas
81 (2018–19)	University of Santo Tomas	National University	National University	De La Salle University
82 (2019–20)	University of Santo Tomas	National University	National University	De La Salle University
83 (2020–21)	Cancelled due to COVID-19 pandemic			
84 (2021–22)	No tournament due to COVID-19 pandemic			University of Santo Tomas
85 (2022–23)	University of Santo Tomas	National University	University of Santo Tomas	National University
86 (2023–24)	National University	National University	University of Santo Tomas	University of Santo Tomas
86 (2023–24)	De La Salle University	National University	National University	University of Santo Tomas
87 (2024–25)	National University	De La Salle University	National University	University of Santo Tomas

== Number of championships by school ==
University	High School	Men's	Women's	Poomsae	Total
University of Santo Tomas	13	15	12	8	48
De La Salle University	0	5	5	3	13
National University	2	5	5	1	13
University of the East	5	0	1	0	6
Ateneo de Manila University	3	0	0	0	3
Far Eastern University	0	1	2	0	3
University of the Philippines Diliman	0	0	1	1	2

== See also ==
- Taekwondo in the Philippines
- NCAA Taekwondo Championship
