= NCAA badminton championships (Philippines) =

Badminton championship

- Sport: Badminton
- Founded: 2009
- Country: Philippines
- Most recent champions: Men's division: De La Salle–College of Saint Benilde; Women's division: San Beda University; Juniors' division: San Sebastian College–Recoletos
- Most titles: Men's division: De La Salle–College of Saint Benilde, San Beda University (4 titles); Women's division: De La Salle–College of Saint Benilde (5 titles); Juniors' division: San Sebastian (4 titles)

The NCAA badminton championship is a demonstration sport that was introduced in its 2009–10 season. No tournament was held in season 87.

== Champions ==
Demonstration sport
Denotes school won the triple crown
Denotes school won 2 of 3 divisions in the same year

Academic Year	Men	Women	Juniors
2009–10	Emilio Aguinaldo College (1)	De La Salle–College of Saint Benilde (1)	Colegio de San Juan de Letran (1)
2010–11	De La Salle–College of Saint Benilde (1)	De La Salle–College of Saint Benilde (2)	La Salle Green Hills (1)
2011–12	Not held		
2014–15	Colegio de San Juan de Letran (1)	De La Salle–College of Saint Benilde (3)	La Salle Green Hills (2)
2015–16	De La Salle–College of Saint Benilde (2)	De La Salle–College of Saint Benilde (4)	La Salle Green Hills (3)
2016–17	Colegio de San Juan de Letran (2)	Arellano University (1)	Colegio de San Juan de Letran (2)
2017–18	San Beda College (1)	Arellano University (2)	San Beda College–Rizal (1)
2018–19	San Beda University (2)	De La Salle–College of Saint Benilde (5)	San Sebastian College–Recoletos (1)
2019–20	San Beda University (3)	Arellano University (3)	Colegio de San Juan de Letran (3)
2020–21	Not held due to the COVID-19 pandemic.		
2021–22	Not held due to the COVID-19 pandemic.		
2022–23	Not held due to the COVID-19 pandemic.		
2023–24	San Beda University (4)	San Sebastian College–Recoletos (1)	San Sebastian College–Recoletos (2)
2024–25	De La Salle–College of Saint Benilde (3)	San Beda University (1)	San Sebastian College–Recoletos (3)
2025–26	De La Salle–College of Saint Benilde (4)	San Beda University (2)	San Sebastian College–Recoletos (4)

== Number of championships by school ==
School	Men	Women	Juniors	Total
De La Salle–College of Saint Benilde	4	5	0	9
San Beda University	4	2	1	7
Colegio de San Juan de Letran	2	0	3	5
San Sebastian College–Recoletos	0	1	4	4
La Salle Green Hills	0	0	3	3
Arellano University	0	3	0	3
Emilio Aguinaldo College	1	0	0	1

== See also ==
- UAAP Badminton Championship
