= NCAA taekwondo championships =

Taekwondo competition

NCAA Taekwondo championship
- Sport: Taekwondo
- Founded: 1998
- Country: Philippines
- Most recent champions: Men's division: De La Salle–College of Saint Benilde; Women's division: San Beda University; Juniors' division: San Beda University–Rizal
- Most titles: Men's division: San Beda University (12 titles); Women's division: De La Salle–College of Saint Benilde, San Beda University (6 titles); Juniors' division: La Salle Green Hills (11 titles)

== Champions ==
Demonstration sport
Denotes school won double crown
Denotes school won triple crown

NCAA Season	Men	Women	Juniors
74 (1998–99)	De La Salle–College of Saint Benilde (1)	No tournament	La Salle Green Hills (1)
75 (1999–2000)		No tournament	Not Held
76 (2000–01)	Colegio de San Juan de Letran (1)	No tournament	La Salle Green Hills (2)
77 (2001–02)	Colegio de San Juan de Letran (2)	No tournament	La Salle Green Hills (3)
78 (2002–03)	Colegio de San Juan de Letran (3)	No tournament	San Beda College (1)
79 (2003–04)	Colegio de San Juan de Letran (4)	No tournament	La Salle Green Hills (4)
80 (2004–05)	Colegio de San Juan de Letran (5)	No tournament	La Salle Green Hills (5)
81 (2005–06)	San Beda College (1)	No tournament	Colegio de San Juan de Letran (1)
82 (2006–07)	De La Salle–College of Saint Benilde (2)	No tournament	Colegio de San Juan de Letran (2)
83 (2007–08)	San Beda College (2)	No tournament	Colegio de San Juan de Letran (3)
84 (2008–09)	De La Salle–College of Saint Benilde (3)	No tournament	La Salle Green Hills (6)
85 (2009–10)	San Beda College (3)	Colegio de San Juan de Letran (1)	La Salle Green Hills (7)
86 (2010–11)	San Beda College (4)	San Beda College (1)	La Salle Green Hills (8)
87 (2011–12)	San Beda College (5)	De La Salle–College of Saint Benilde (1)	La Salle Green Hills (9)
88 (2012–13)	De La Salle–College of Saint Benilde (4)	De La Salle–College of Saint Benilde (2)	San Sebastian College–Recoletos (1)
89 (2013–14)	San Beda College (6)	San Beda College (2)	San Sebastian College–Recoletos (2)
90 (2014–15)	San Beda College (7)	San Beda College (3)	San Sebastian College–Recoletos (3)
91 (2015–16)	San Beda College (8)	De La Salle–College of Saint Benilde (3)	La Salle Green Hills (10)
92 (2016–17)	San Beda College (9)	De La Salle–College of Saint Benilde (4)	Arellano University (1)
93 (2017–18)	San Beda College (10)		Arellano University (2)
94 (2018–19)	De La Salle–College of Saint Benilde (5)	De La Salle–College of Saint Benilde (5)	Arellano University (3)
95 (2019–20)	De La Salle–College of Saint Benilde (6)	De La Salle–College of Saint Benilde (6)	San Beda University–Rizal (2)
96 (2020–21)	Speedkicking: (Finweight) San Beda; (Flyweight) Benilde; (Bantamweight) San Beda; (Featherweight) San Beda; (Lightweight) EAC; (Welterweight) Benilde	Speedkicking: (Finweight) Arellano; (Flyweight) Benilde; (Bantamweight) Letran; (Featherweight) Arellano; (Lightweight) Arellano; (Welterweight) Benilde; (Middleweight) Benilde; (Heavyweight) Benilde	Speedkicking: (Bantamweight) San Beda–Rizal; (Featherweight) San Beda–Rizal; (Welterweight) LSGH; (Light middleweight) LSGH; (Middleweight) LSGH; (Light heavyweight) EAC–ICA; (Heavyweight) LSGH
97 (2021–22)			No tournament due to COVID-19 pandemic
98 (2022–23)			No tournament due to COVID-19 pandemic
99 (2023–24)	San Beda University (11)	San Beda University (4)	San Beda University–Rizal (3)
100 (2024–25)	San Beda University (12)	San Beda University (5)	San Beda University–Rizal (4)
101 (2025–26)	Benilde Blazers (7)	San Beda University (6)	San Beda University–Rizal (5)

== Number of championships by school ==
School	Men	Women	Juniors	Total
San Beda University	12	6	5	23
De La Salle–College of Saint Benilde	7	6	0	13
La Salle Green Hills	0	0	11	11
Colegio de San Juan de Letran	5	1	3	9
Arellano University	0	0	3	3
San Sebastian College–Recoletos	0	0	2	2

== See also ==
- Taekwondo in the Philippines
- UAAP Taekwondo Championship
