= Arellano–Perpetual rivalry =

Rivalry between the two teams

Arellano–Perpetual cheerleading rivalry
- AU Chiefsquad Altas Perpsquad
- Sport: Cheerleading
- Latest meeting: March 12, 2026 (Mall of Asia Arena, Pasay); AU Chiefsquad
- Next meeting: TBA

Statistics
- All-time record: NCAA Cheerleading Championships: Arellano 8; Perpetual 9
- Longest win streak: Arellano, 7 (2016–present)
- Current win streak: Arellano, 7 (2016–present)

Locations of Arellano (cyan) and Perpetual (brown).

This rivalry is between Legarda's Arellano and Alabang–Zapote's Perpetual Help. The rivalry is played at the National Collegiate Athletic Association (Philippines).

== NCAA Cheerleading Competition ==
The rivalry between the Arellano University Chiefsquad and the University of Perpetual Help System Dalta Altas Perpsquad stands as the definitive dynamic of the NCAA Cheerleading Competition. Since Arellano's rise in 2012, these two programs have held a virtual monopoly on the podium, consistently occupying the top two positions.

=== Overview ===
During the early era of NCAA cheerleading (2004–2013), the Altas Perpsquad established the league's foundational dynasty, capturing nine titles, including a historic five-peat from 2009 to 2013. The competitive landscape shifted when Arellano University joined the league. The Chiefsquad earned their first title in 2014, dethroning Perpetual Help by a single point. Although the Perpsquad reclaimed the championship in 2015, Arellano initiated an unprecedented run beginning in 2016 (NCAA Season 92).

From 2016 through 2026, Arellano achieved a seven-consecutive competition title streak (excluding the 2020–2022 pandemic hiatus) under head coach Lucky San Juan. Across eight consecutive competitions, Perpetual Help finished directly behind Arellano as the runner-up, cementing one of the most consistent 1–2 rivalries in the NCAA Cheerleading competition.

=== Head-to-Head Annual Results ===
Legend
- Champion
- 1st Runner-up
- 2nd Runner-up
C	Tournament cancelled
- Not in the league
- Did not join
- Guest school
- Under probation

A.Y.	AU Chiefsquad	Altas Perpsquad	Notes
2004–2005	--	4th	
2005–2006	--	1st	
2006–2007	--	1st	
2007–2008	--	1st (209.50)	
2008–2009	--	5th (172.80)	
2009–2010	8th (169.00)	1st (335.50)	
2010–2011	7th (246.50)	1st (300.00)	
2011–2022	4th (255.50)	1st (335.00)	
2012–2013	2nd (554.50)	1st (598.50)	
2013–2014	2nd (468.00)	1st (480.50)	
2014–2015	1st (405.50)	2nd (404.50)	
2015–2016	2nd (193.00)	1st (195.00)	
2016–2017	1st (218.00)	2nd (199.50)	
2017–2018	1st (234.50)	2nd (226.00)	
2018–2019	1st (229.50)	2nd (222.50)	
2019–2020	The competition was suspended due to COVID-19 pandemic in the Philippines.		
2020–2021	The competition was suspended due to COVID-19 pandemic in the Philippines.		
2021–2022	The competition was suspended due to COVID-19 pandemic in the Philippines.		
2022–2023	1st (245.50)	2nd (227.50)	
2023–2024	1st (253.50)	2nd (231.50)	
2024–2025	1st (218.00)	2nd (213.50)	
2025–2026	1st (231.00)	2nd (221.00)	

=== Match-up ===
Arellano victories	Perpetual victories

No.	Date	Location	Winner	Score	Note/s
1	October 21, 2009	Filoil Flying V Arena	Perpetual	335.50–169.00	
2	September 29, 2010	Filoil Flying V Arena	Perpetual	300.00–246.50	
3	March 10, 2012	Filoil Flying V Arena	Perpetual	335.00–255.50	
4	March 9, 2013	Mall of Asia Arena	Perpetual	598.50–554.50	
5	March 8, 2014	Mall of Asia Arena	Perpetual	480.50–468.00	(Note: Perpetual became the first team in league history to accomplish a cheerleading 5-peat.)
6	March 10, 2015	Mall of Asia Arena	Arellano	405.50–404.50	(Note: Arellano's first cheerleading championship.)
7	March 8, 2016	Mall of Asia Arena	Perpetual	195.00–193.00	
8	March 9, 2017	Mall of Asia Arena	Arellano	218.00–199.50	

No.	Date	Location	Winner	Score	Note/s
9	March 16, 2018	Smart Araneta Coliseum	Arellano	234.50–226.00	
10	March 28, 2019	Mall of Asia Arena	Arellano	229.50–222.50	
11	April 30, 2023	Rizal Memorial Sports Complex	Arellano	245.50–227.50	
12	June 19, 2024	Filoil EcoOil Centre	Arellano	253.50–231.50	(Note: Arellano eclipsed Perpetual's historic 5-peat by extending their own dominant streak to six titles.)
13	May 22, 2025	Mall of Asia Arena	Arellano	218.00–213.50	(Note: Arellano surpassed Perpetual's record for the longest NCAA cheerleading title streak, capturing its seventh overall championship and establishing a league-best six-peat.)
14	March 12, 2026	Mall of Asia Arena	Arellano	231.00–221.00	(Note: Arellano captured its eighth overall cheerleading championship, stretching its historic winning streak to seven straight titles.)
Series: Arellano leads 8–6
(*) = finals games; (^) = semifinals; (≠) = seeding playoffs

=== Summary ===
Team	Last championship	Last top 3 appearance	Rank among competing schools										Podium finishes
Team	Last championship	Last top 3 appearance	1st place, gold medalist(s)	2nd place, silver medalist(s)	3rd place, bronze medalist(s)	4	5	6	7	8	9	10	Podium finishes
AU Chiefsquad	2026	2026	8	3					1	1			11
Altas Perpsquad	2026	2026	9	8		1	1						17

== Volleyball ==
=== Men's Volleyball ===
Arellano and Perpetual competed at the NCAA Men's Volleyball Finals in Seasons 86 and 93. Both teams are expected to meet at least 2 times per year.

Arellano victories	Perpetual victories

No.	Date	Location	Winner	Score	Note/s
1	2010		Perpetual	1–0	
2	2011		Arellano	1–0	(Note: Arellano swept the elimination round.)
3	2011^		Perpetual	1–0	
4	January 20, 2011*		Perpetual	3–1	
5	January 24, 2011*		Perpetual	3–1	
6	2012		Perpetual	1–0	(Note: Perpetual swept the elimination round.)
7	2012^		Perpetual	1–0	
8	2013				
9	2014		Perpetual	3–0	
10	2015				
11	2016		Perpetual	1–0	
12	2017		Perpetual	1–0	
13	2018		Perpetual	3–0	(Note: Perpetual swept the elimination round.)

No.	Date	Location	Winner	Score	Note/s
14	February 16, 2018*		Arellano	3–2	(Note: Finals game 1.)
15	February 19, 2018*		Perpetual	3–1	(Note: Finals game 2.)
16	February 22, 2018*		Perpetual	3–1	(Note: Finals game 3.)
17	2019		Perpetual	3–1	(Note: Perpetual swept the elimination round.)
18	2020		Perpetual	3–1	(Note: Perpetual swept the elimination round.)
19	2023		Perpetual	3–0	(Note: Perpetual swept the elimination round.)
20	2024		Perpetual	3–0	(Note: Perpetual swept the elimination round.)
21	2025		Arellano	3–2	
22	2025		Arellano	3–0	
23	2026		Perpetual	3–1	
Series: Perpetual leads 17–4
(*) = finals games; (^) = semifinals; (≠) = seeding playoffs

=== Women's Volleyball ===
Arellano and Perpetual competed at the NCAA Women's Volleyball Finals in Seasons 89 and 95. Both teams are expected to meet at least 2 times per year.

Arellano victories	Perpetual victories

No.	Date	Location	Winner	Score	Note/s
1	2010		Perpetual	1–0	
2	2011		Perpetual	1–0	(Note: The semifinals in the women's division was restarted after the league forfeited all the games that April Ann Sartin and Ronnery dela Cruz of Perpetual Help and Arianne Yap and Janel Lim of St. Benilde played for eligibility violations. CSB's and Perpetual's games during the elimination round were also forfeited.)
3	2012		Perpetual	1–0	(Note: Perpetual swept the elimination round.)
4	2013				
5	2014		Arellano	3–2	
6	2014^		Perpetual	1–0	
7	January 31, 2014*		Perpetual	3–2	
8	February 3, 2014*		Arellano	3–0	
9	February 6, 2014*		Perpetual	3–2	
10	2015				
11	2016		Arellano	1–0	
12	2017		Arellano	3–1	
13	2018		Arellano	3–2	
14	2019		Arellano	3–1	

No.	Date	Location	Winner	Score	Note/s
15	February 1, 2019*	Filoil Flying V Arena	Perpetual	3–1	
16	February 8, 2019*	Filoil Flying V Arena	Arellano	3–2	
17	February 12, 2019*	Filoil Flying V Arena	Arellano	3–1	
18	2020		Perpetual	3–2	
19	2022		Perpetual	3–0	(Note: Perpetual gave Arellano its only elimination round loss.)
20	2023		Arellano	3–0	
21	2023		Perpetual	3–1	
22	2024		Arellano	3–1	
23	2025		Perpetual	3–1	
24	2025		Arellano	3–2	
25	2026		Perpetual	3–1	
Series: Arellano leads 12–11
(*) = finals games; (^) = semifinals; (≠) = seeding playoffs

=== Boys' Volleyball ===
Both teams are expected to meet at least 2 times per year.

Arellano victories	Perpetual victories

No.	Date	Location	Winner	Score	Note/s
1	2010		Perpetual	1–0	
2	2011		Perpetual	1–0	(Note: Perpetual swept the elimination round.)
3	2011^		Perpetual	1–0	
4	2012		Perpetual	1–0	
5	2012^		Perpetual	1–0	
6	2013				
7	2014		Perpetual	3–2	
8	2015				
9	2016		Perpetual	1–0	
10	2017				

No.	Date	Location	Winner	Score	Note/s
11	2018				
12	2019		Perpetual	1–0	(Note: Perpetual swept the elimination round.)
13	2020		Arellano	3–2	
14	2024		Arellano	2–0	
15	2025		Perpetual	2–0	(Note: Perpetual swept the elimination round.)
16	2026		Arellano	3–0	
17	2026≠		#3 Arellano	3–0	
Series: Perpetual leads 9–4
(*) = finals games; (^) = semifinals; (≠) = seeding playoffs

=== Girls' Volleyball ===
Arellano and Perpetual competed at the NCAA Girls' Volleyball Finals in Seasons 99, 100 and 101.

Arellano victories	Perpetual victories

No.	Date	Location	Winner	Score	Note/s
1	2019	Arellano University A. Mabini Gym	Arellano	3–0	(Note: Arellano swept the elimation round.) (Note: As a precautionary measure in light of the Novel Coronavirus (COVID-19) outbreak, the NCAA management committee decided to postpone all Season 95 sporting events starting February 14. All juniors' games were postponed starting February 7. Games was originally planned to resume on March 16 after a month of halt following the outbreak.)
2	2022	Arellano University A. Mabini Gym			
3	2023	Arellano University A. Mabini Gym			
4	2024	Arellano University A. Mabini Gym	Arellano	2–1	
5	May 12, 2024*	Filoil EcoOil Centre	Perpetual	3–2	(Note: Finals game 1.)
6	May 15, 2024*	Filoil EcoOil Centre	Perpetual	3–2	(Note: Finals game 2. Perpetual won its first girls volleyball championship.)
7	2025	Arellano University A. Mabini Gym	Perpetual	2–0	(Note: Perpetual swept the elimination round.)

No.	Date	Location	Winner	Score	Note/s
8	May 30, 2025*	Playtime Filoil Centre	Arellano	3–1	(Note: Finals game 1.)
9	June 1, 2025*	Playtime Filoil Centre	Arellano	3–2	(Note: Finals game 2. Arellano won its first girls volleyball championship.)
10	2026	Arellano University A. Mabini Gym	Perpetual	2–0	(Note: Perpetual swept the elimination round.)
11	2026*	Arellano University A. Mabini Gym	Perpetual	3–0	(Note: Finals game 1.)
12	2026*	Arellano University A. Mabini Gym	Perpetual	3–0	(Note: Finals game 2. Perpetual won its second girls volleyball championship.)
Series: Perpetual leads 6–4
(*) = finals games; (^) = semifinals; (≠) = seeding playoffs

== Basketball ==
Arellano–Perpetual basketball rivalry
- Arellano Chiefs Perpetual Altas
- Sport: Men's Basketball
- Latest meeting: October 26, 2026 (Filoil EcoOil Centre, San Juan, Metro Manila) Perpetual, 65–58
- Next meeting: TBA

Statistics
- All-time record: NCAA Final Four (Philippines) appearances: Arellano 2; Perpetual 10; Titles: Arellano: NCAA 0; Perpetual: NCAA 0
- Longest win streak: Tie, 3 (2009–2010; 2012–2013; 2023–2024;)
- Current win streak: Perpetual, 1 (2026–present)

=== Men's Basketball ===
Both teams are expected to meet at least 2 times per year.

Arellano victories	Perpetual victories

No.	Date	Location	Winner	Score	Note/s
1	2009		Arellano	85–70	
2	2009		Arellano	75–70	
3	2010		Arellano	86–67	
4	2010		Perpetual	66–61	
5	2011		Arellano	71–65	
6	2011		Perpetual	77–60	
7	2012		Arellano	63–54	
8	2012		Perpetual	89–58	
9	2013		Perpetual	73–66	
10	2013		Perpetual	82–80	
11	2014		Arellano	97–85	
12	2014		Perpetual	101–86	
13	2015		Perpetual	76–66	
14	2015		Arellano	84–77^{OT}	
15	2016		Arellano	83–78	
16	2016		Perpetual	76–62	
17	2017		Perpetual	68–59	
18	2017		Arellano	62–52	

No.	Date	Location	Winner	Score	Note/s
19	2018		Arellano	76–72	
20	2018		Perpetual	57–45	
21	2019		Perpetual	75–73	
22	2019		Arellano	91–86	
23	2022		Perpetual	87–70	
24	May 1, 2022≠		Perpetual	59–52	(Note: Qualifying playoff. Perpetual advanced to the fourth seed playoff.)
25	2022		Arellano	61–59	
26	2022		Arellano	86–81	
27	2023		Perpetual	85–66	
28	2023		Perpetual	81–74	
29	2024		Perpetual	69–67	
30	2024		Arellano	66–59	
31	2025		Perpetual	72–67	
32	2025		Arellano	70–69	
33	September 25, 2026	PhilSports Arena	Arellano	88–65	(Note: Arellano had a 2-0 record prior to the game.)
34	October 26, 2026	Filoil EcoOil Centre	Perpetual	65–58	
Series: Perpetual leads 18–16
(*) = finals games; (^) = semifinals; (≠) = seeding playoffs

== See also ==
- National Collegiate Athletic Association (Philippines)
- San Beda–Letran rivalry
- Arellano–San Beda rivalry
- San Beda–Perpetual rivalry
- San Beda–San Sebastian rivalry
- Battle of Intramuros
- San Sebastian–Letran rivalry
- JRU–San Sebastian rivalry
