= Arellano–San Beda rivalry =

Rivalry between the two teams

Arellano–San Beda men's basketball rivalry
- Arellano Chiefs San Beda Red Lions
- Other names: Battle of Legarda; Battle of Concepcion Aguila
- Sport: Men's basketball
- Latest meeting: October 13, 2026 (Playtime Filoil Centre, San Juan); Arellano, 56–55
- Next meeting: TBA

Statistics
- All-time record: NCAA Final Four (Philippines) appearances: San Beda 20; Arellano 2; Titles: San Beda: NCAA 23; Arellano: NCAA 0
- Longest win streak: San Beda, 15 (2016–2023)
- Current win streak: Arellano, 1 (2026–present)

Locations of Arellano (cyan) and San Beda (red).

This rivalry is between Legarda's Arellano and Mendiola's San Beda. Others would refer to it as the Battle of Legarda or Battle of Concepcion Aguila, because of the streets that run between these universities. The rivalry is played at the National Collegiate Athletic Association (Philippines).

Since Arellano joined in season 85, it has faced San Beda in various championship series, such as the men's basketball and football, and women's volleyball, and juniors' basketball.

== Basketball Statistics ==
In 2014, led by Jio Jalalon and coach Jerry Codiñera, the Chiefs qualified to its first Finals appearance. They were swept by the four-time defending champions San Beda Red Lions. On the next year, the Chiefs missed the Final Four, but returned to the Finals in 2016. In a rematch of the 2014 Finals, the Chiefs were again swept by San Beda.

=== Men's basketball results ===
Both teams are expected to meet at least 2 times per year.

San Beda victories	Arellano victories

No.	Date	Location	Winner	Score	Note/s
1	July 6, 2009	Filoil Flying V Arena	San Beda	102–74	
2	September 9, 2009	Filoil Flying V Arena	San Beda	83–72	(Note: San Beda lost to San Sebastian in the finals.)
3	August 10, 2010	Filoil Flying V Arena	San Beda	92–57	(Note: San Beda had a 5-0 record prior to the game.)
4	September 17, 2010	Filoil Flying V Arena	San Beda	70–54	(Note: San Beda won against San Sebastian in the finals.)
5	July 18, 2011	Filoil Flying V Arena	San Beda	92–67	(Note: San Beda had a 2-0 record prior to the game.)
6	September 23, 2011	Filoil Flying V Arena	San Beda	84–60	(Note: San Beda won against San Sebastian in the finals.)
7	June 24, 2012	Filoil Flying V Arena	San Beda	81–71	(Note: Only six players played for San Beda during this game, as majority of their players were suspended due to an off-season brawl with the San Sebastian Women's Volleyball team.)
8	September 20, 2012	Filoil Flying V Arena	San Beda	82–75	(Note: San Beda won against Letran in the finals.)
9	July 4, 2013	Filoil Flying V Arena	San Beda	67–54	
10	October 26, 2013	Filoil Flying V Arena	San Beda	78–62	(Note: San Beda ended Arellano's 4-game winning streak. San Beda won against Letran in the finals.)
11	July 12, 2014	Filoil Flying V Arena	San Beda	91–81	
12	October 4, 2014	Filoil Flying V Arena	Arellano	78–76	(Note: First time Arellano defeated San Beda since it joined the league in 2009.)
13	October 10, 2014≠	Filoil Flying V Arena	#1 San Beda	97–69	(Note: First-seed playoff.)
14	October 20, 2014*	Mall of Asia Arena	San Beda	74–66	(Note: Finals Game 1. Arellano's first finals appearance.)
15	October 22, 2014*	Mall of Asia Arena	San Beda	89–70	(Note: Finals Game 2. San Beda wins its 19th men's basketball championship.)
16	August 18, 2015	Filoil Flying V Arena	Arellano	88–84	(Note: Arellano ended San Beda's 5-game winning streak.)
17	October 1, 2015	Filoil Flying V Arena	Arellano	91–72	(Note: Arellano swept San Beda in the eliminations. San Beda lost to Letran in the finals, while Arellano lost to Mapúa and the fourth-seed playoff.)
18	July 22, 2016	Filoil Flying V Arena	San Beda	101–86	(Note: San Beda had a 5-0 record prior to the game.)
19	September 23, 2016	Filoil Flying V Arena	San Beda	91–81	(Note: San Beda ended Arellano's 4-game winning streak and tied Arellano at 14 wins and 4 losses at the end of the elimination round.)
20	September 27, 2016≠	Filoil Flying V Arena	#1 San Beda	80–73	(Note: First-seed playoff. Winner will face Perpetual Help, while loser will face Mapúa, in the semifinals. Either way, both teams had twice-to-beat advantage in the semifinals.)

No.	Date	Location	Winner	Score	Note/s
21	October 6, 2016*	Mall of Asia Arena	San Beda	88–85	(Note: Finals Game 1.)
22	October 11, 2016*	Mall of Asia Arena	San Beda	83–73	(Note: Finals Game 2. San Beda wins its 20th men's basketball championship.)
23	August 29, 2017	Filoil Flying V Arena	San Beda	95–80	(Note: San Beda was on a 6-game winning streak prior to the game.)
24	September 29, 2017	Filoil Flying V Arena	San Beda	83–72	(Note: San Beda was on a 11-game winning streak prior to the game. Arellano lost to Letran in the first round of the fourth–seed playoffs. while San Beda went on to defeat Lyceum in the finals.)
25	August 25, 2018	Filoil Flying V Arena	San Beda	98–79	
26	October 11, 2018	Filoil Flying V Arena	San Beda	90–52	(Note: San Beda won against Lyceum in the finals.)
27	July 7, 2019	Mall of Asia Arena	San Beda	59–46	
28	September 13, 2019	Filoil Flying V Arena	San Beda	73–66	(Note: San Beda lost to Letran in the finals.)
29	April 17, 2022	St. Benilde Gym	San Beda	82–68	(Note: Arellano lost to Perpetual at the qualifying playoff, while San Beda lost to Mapúa in the semifinals.)
30	October 7, 2022	Filoil EcoOil Centre	San Beda	96–61	
31	November 2, 2022	Filoil EcoOil Centre	San Beda	76–63	(Note: San Beda lost to Benilde in the semifinals.)
32	September 26, 2023	Filoil EcoOil Centre	San Beda	85–61	(Note: Opening game.)
33	October 27, 2023	Filoil EcoOil Centre	Arellano	74–72	
34	September 28, 2024	Filoil EcoOil Centre	Arellano	72–70	
35	October 12, 2024	Filoil EcoOil Centre	San Beda	79–65	
36	October 24, 2025	Playtime Filoil Centre	San Beda	76–53	
37	October 13, 2026	Playtime Filoil Centre	Arellano	56–55	
Series: San Beda leads 31–6
(*) = finals games; (^) = semifinals; (≠) = seeding playoffs

=== Juniors' basketball results ===
Both teams are expected to meet at least 2 times per year.

San Beda victories	Arellano victories

No.	Date	Location	Winner	Score	Note/s
1	2009	Filoil Flying V Arena	San Beda	105–51	
2	2009	Filoil Flying V Arena	San Beda	106–48	(Note: San Beda won against Letran in the finals.)
3	2010	Filoil Flying V Arena	San Beda	77–41	
4	2010	Filoil Flying V Arena	San Beda	89–53	(Note: San Beda won against San Sebastian in the finals.)
5	2011	Filoil Flying V Arena	San Beda	90–70	(Note: San Beda had a 2-0 record prior to the game.)
6	2011	Filoil Flying V Arena	San Beda	79–59	(Note: San Beda won against LSGH in the finals.)
7	2012	Filoil Flying V Arena	San Beda	104–70	
8	2012	Filoil Flying V Arena	San Beda	84–41	(Note: San Beda won against San Sebastian in the finals.)
9	2013	Filoil Flying V Arena	San Beda	108–51	
10	2013	Filoil Flying V Arena	San Beda	96–56	
11	2014	Filoil Flying V Arena	San Beda	99–66	
12	2014	Filoil Flying V Arena	San Beda	98–93	(Note: San Beda won against Malayan in the finals.)
13	2015	Filoil Flying V Arena	San Beda	86–81	
14	2015	Filoil Flying V Arena	San Beda	80–76	
15	October 23, 2015*	Mall of Asia Arena	San Beda	76–68	(Note: Finals game 1. This is Arellano's first juniors finals appearance. Since San Beda swept the elimination round, the Finals is a de facto best of five series with San Beda automatically leading 1–0. Therefore, San Beda has to win twice, while Arellano needed thrice, to win the championship.)
16	October 27, 2015*	Mall of Asia Arena	Arellano	72–68	(Note: Finals game 2. Arellano's first win against San Beda in the juniors division since it joined the league in 2009.)
17	October 29, 2015*	Mall of Asia Arena	San Beda	70–61	(Note: Finals game 3. San Beda wins its 22nd juniors basketball championship.)

No.	Date	Location	Winner	Score	Note/s
18	2016	Filoil Flying V Arena	Arellano	93–90	(Note: Both teams had a 7-0 record prior to the game.)
19	2016	Filoil Flying V Arena	San Beda	92–74	
20	September 30, 2016^	Mall of Asia Arena	Arellano	87–84	(Note: Semifinals. Arellano forced a rubber match.)
21	October 4, 2016^	Mall of Asia Arena	San Beda	102–93	(Note: San Beda lost to Malayan in the finals.)
22	2017	Filoil Flying V Arena	Arellano	67–60	
23	2017	Filoil Flying V Arena	San Beda	94–65	(Note: San Beda lost to LSGH in the semifinals.)
24	2018	Filoil Flying V Arena	San Beda	95–68	
25	2018	Filoil Flying V Arena	San Beda	83–71	(Note: San Beda lost to Malayan in the semifinals.)
26	2019	Filoil Flying V Arena	San Beda	69–67	
27	2019	Filoil Flying V Arena	San Beda	58–54	(Note: San Beda won against Lyceum–Cavite in the finals.)
28	2022	Emilio Aguinaldo College Gym	San Beda	82–53	(Note: San Beda lost to LSGH in the semifinals.)
29	February 18, 2024	Filoil EcoOil Centre	San Beda	85–77	
30	March 23, 2025	Filoil EcoOil Centre	San Beda	105–68	
31	October 24, 2025	Playtime Filoil Centre	Arellano	79–74	
32	October 13, 2026	Playtime Filoil Centre	Arellano	56–55	
Series: San Beda leads 26–6
(*) = finals games; (^) = semifinals; (≠) = seeding playoffs

=== Final Four Rankings ===
For comparison, these are the rankings of these two teams since the Final Four format was introduced.

==== Seniors' division ====
Team ╲ Year	2009	2010	2011	2012	2013	2014	2015	2016	2017	2018	2019	2020	2021 (Note: 2021-22 season was played in early 2022 and the tournament was held in into a round robin tournament instead of the usual double round eliminations.)	2022	2023	2024
Arellano	5	6	7	8	7	2	5	2	6	8	10	C	6	7	10	7
San Beda	1	1	1	1	1	1	1	1	2	1	1	C	3	4	3	3

==== Juniors' division ====
Team ╲ Year	2009	2010	2011	2012	2013	2014	2015	2016	2017	2018	2019	2020	2021	2022	2023 (Note: 2023-24 season was played in early 2024 and the tournament was held in into a round robin tournament instead of the usual double round eliminations.)
Arellano	8	9	7	6	9	7	3	4	6	7	5	C	C	7	10
San Beda	1	1	1	1	1	2	1	1	1	3	1	C	C	2	5

Legend * Number denotes playoff seeding. Shade denotes final position.
Finished as the champion
Finished as the 1st runner-up
Finished as semifinalist
Lost in 4th-seed playoff
Twice to beat advantage
Lost in play-in tournament
C Tournament cancelled
Guest school
Under probation

== Volleyball Statistics ==
=== Men's volleyball results ===
San Beda victories	Arellano victories

No.	Date	Location	Winner	Score	Note/s
1	2010	Emilio Aguinaldo College Gym	San Beda	3–0	(Note: San Beda lost to Letran in the Finals.)
2	2011		Arellano	3–0	
3	2011^		Arellano	3–0	(Note: Semifinals. Arellano lost to Perpetual in the finals.)
4	2012		Arellano	3–0	
5	2012^		San Beda	3–0	(Note: Semifinals. San Beda lost to Perpetual in the finals.)
6	January 10, 2013	Filoil Flying V Arena	San Beda	3–1	
7	November 20, 2013		San Beda	3–0	
8	November 20, 2014	Filoil Flying V Arena	Arellano	3–0	
9	2016≠	Filoil Flying V Arena	#4 San Beda	3–1	(Note: Fourth seed playoff. San Beda lost to EAC in the semifinals.)
10	2017	Filoil Flying V Arena	San Beda	3–2	(Note: San Beda lost to Perpetual in the semifinals.)
11	2018	Filoil Flying V Arena	Arellano	3–0	(Note: San Beda lost to Benilde in the first round playoff, while Arellano lost to Perpetual in the finals.)

No.	Date	Location	Winner	Score	Note/s
12	2019	Filoil Flying V Arena	Arellano	3–1	(Note: Arellano lost to EAC in the first round playoff.)
13	January 27, 2020	Filoil Flying V Arena	San Beda	3–1	
14	February 22, 2023	San Andres Sports Complex	Arellano	3–0	
15	March 29, 2023^	Filoil EcoOil Centre	San Beda	3–1	(Note: Second round stepladder semifinals. San Beda lost to Perpetual in the finals.)
16	April 19, 2024	Filoil EcoOil Centre	Arellano	3–2	
17	February 28, 2025	San Beda University Gym	San Beda	3–1	
18	April 30, 2025	Filoil EcoOil Centre	Arellano	3–0	
19	January 31, 2026	San Andres Sports Complex	Arellano	3–0	
20	March 3, 2026	EAC Sports and Cultural Center	Arellano	3–1	
Series: Arellano leads 11–9
(*) = finals games; (^) = semifinals; (≠) = seeding playoffs

=== Women's volleyball results ===
Arellano and San Beda met in the season 93 women's volleyball finals.

San Beda victories	Arellano victories

No.	Date	Location	Winner	Score	Note/s
1	2010^	Emilio Aguinaldo College Gym	Arellano	3–0	
2	2011		San Beda	3–0	
3	January 25, 2012		San Beda	3–0	
4	January 10, 2013	Filoil Flying V Arena	Arellano	3–1	
5	November 20, 2013		San Beda	3–1	(Note: Arellano lost to Perpetual in the Finals.)
6	November 20, 2014	Filoil Flying V Arena	Arellano	3–0	
7	2016	Filoil Flying V Arena	Arellano	3–0	(Note: Arellano lost to Benilde in the playoff semifinals.)
8	2017	Filoil Flying V Arena	Arellano	3–0	(Note: Arellano defeated San Sebastian in the finals.)
9	2018	Filoil Flying V Arena	Arellano	3–0	(Note: Arellano gave San Beda its only elimination round loss.)
10	February 16, 2018*	Filoil Flying V Arena	Arellano	3–2	(Note: Finals game 1.)
11	February 19, 2018*	Filoil Flying V Arena	Arellano	3–0	(Note: Finals game 2. Arellano won its 3rd women's volleyball championship.)
12	2019	Filoil Flying V Arena	San Beda	3–2	(Note: San Beda dealt Arellano's only elimination round loss.)

No.	Date	Location	Winner	Score	Note/s
13	January 22, 2019^	Filoil Flying V Arena	Arellano	3–0	(Note: Semifinals. Arellano won vs Perpetual in the finals.)
14	January 27, 2020	Filoil Flying V Arena	Arellano	3–0	
15	June 14, 2022	Paco Arena	Arellano	3–1	(Note: First Arellano vs San Beda elimination round game since the COVID-19 pandemic in the Philippines.)
16	February 22, 2023	San Andres Sports Complex	Arellano	3–1	
17	April 19, 2024	Filoil EcoOil Centre	Arellano	3–0	
18	February 28, 2025	San Beda University Gym	Arellano	3–1	
19	April 30, 2025	Filoil EcoOil Centre	Arellano	3–1	
20	January 31, 2026	San Andres Sports Complex	San Beda	3–0	
21	March 3, 2026	EAC Sports and Cultural Center	Arellano	3–2	
Series: Arellano leads 16–5
(*) = finals games; (^) = semifinals; (≠) = seeding playoffs

== See also ==
- National Collegiate Athletic Association (Philippines)
- San Beda–Letran rivalry
- San Beda–San Sebastian rivalry
- Arellano-Perpetual rivalry
- San Beda–Perpetual rivalry
- San Sebastian–Letran rivalry
- JRU–San Sebastian rivalry
- Battle of Intramuros
- Battle of the East
