= NCAA Season 101 volleyball tournaments =

Volleyball tournament

NCAA Season 101
- "Building Greatness"
- Host school: Colegio de San Juan de Letran (Collegiate); Arellano University (High school)
Men's Finals	G1	G2	G3	Wins
Benilde Blazing Spikers	1	3	3	2
Mapúa Cardinals	3	2	0	1
- Duration: April 5–10, 2026
- Arena(s): Rizal Memorial Coliseum
- Finals MVP: Reymark Betco
- Winning coach: Arnold Laniog
- Semifinalists: Letran Knights (bronze); Arellano Chiefs
- TV network(s): Heart of Asia
Women's Finals	G1	G2	G3	Wins
Benilde Lady Blazers	2	3	2	1
Letran Lady Knights	3	0	3	2
- Duration: April 5–10, 2026
- Arena(s): Rizal Memorial Coliseum
- Finals MVP: Marie Judiel Nitura
- Winning coach: Mayeth Carolino
- Semifinalists: Perpetual Lady Altas (bronze); San Beda Lady Red Spikers
- TV network(s): GTV Heart of Asia
Boys' Finals	G1	G2	Wins
Malayan Junior Spikers	3	3	2
Letran Squires	1	1	0
- Duration: April 6–9, 2026
- Arena(s): Arellano University Gym in Pasay City
- Finals MVP: Roderick Medino
- Winning coach: Ralph Ocampo
- Semifinalists: Arellano Braves (bronze); Perpetual Junior Altas
Girls' Finals	G1	G2	Wins
Perpetual Junior Lady Altas	3	3	2
Arellano Lady Braves	0	0	0
- Duration: March 26–30, 2026
- Arena(s): Arellano University Gym in Pasay City
- Finals MVP: Elizha Sildo
- Winning coach: Sandy Rieta
- Semifinalists: EAC–ICA Lady Brigadiers (bronze); Lyceum Junior Lady Pirates

The NCAA Season 101 volleyball tournaments are the volleyball tournaments of the National Collegiate Athletic Association (Philippines) for its 2025–26 season.

The seniors and juniors tournament started on January 23, 2026, at the San Andres Sports Complex.

For the seniors’ tournaments, teams are divided into two groups for the classification round. The classification round consists of three phases. In the first phase, teams play a single round-robin within their respective groups. The second phase, known as the crossover stage, features matchups between teams from opposite groups. The third phase is again played within each group.

Following the classification round, teams advance to a play-in tournament to determine the quarterfinalists. In this stage, the top two teams from each group will hold a twice-to-beat advantage and will face the lower-ranked qualified teams.

The winners of the quarterfinals will advance to the semifinals, which will be played in a best-of-three series. The winners of the semifinals will then compete in a best-of-three finals series, while the losers of the semifinals will play a single playoff game to determine third place.

== Teams ==
Seniors' division
University	Men		Women	
University	Team	Coach	Team	Coach
Arellano University (AU)	Arellano Chiefs	Bryan Vitug	Arellano Lady Chiefs	Roberto Javier
Colegio de San Juan de Letran (CSJL)	Letran Knights	Brian Esquibel	Letran Lady Knights	Mayeth Carolino
De La Salle–College of Saint Benilde (CSB)	Benilde Blazing Spikers	Arnold Laniog	Benilde Lady Blazers	Jerry Yee
Emilio Aguinaldo College (EAC)	EAC Generals	Melchor Santos	EAC Lady Generals	Kirk Ong
José Rizal University (JRU)	JRU Heavy Bombers	Larry Sioco Jr.	JRU Lady Bombers	Mia Tioseco
Lyceum of the Philippines University (LPU)	Lyceum Pirates	Ciarnelle Wanta	Lyceum Lady Pirates	Cromwel Garcia
Mapúa University (MU)	Mapúa Cardinals	Clarence Esteban	Mapúa Lady Cardinals	Clarence Esteban
San Beda University (SBU)	San Beda Red Spikers	Ariel Dela Cruz	San Beda Lady Red Spikers	Kungfu Reyes
San Sebastian College – Recoletos (SSC–R)	San Sebastian Stags	Boyet Delmoro	San Sebastian Lady Stags	Roger Gorayeb
University of Perpetual Help System DALTA (UPHSD)	Perpetual Altas Spikers	Macky Cariño	Perpetual Lady Altas	Sandy Rieta

Juniors' division
High school	Boys' team	Girls' team
Arellano University High School (AU)	Arellano Braves	Arellano Lady Braves
Colegio de San Juan de Letran (CSJL)	Letran Squires	—N/a
Immaculate Conception Academy (ICA)	EAC-ICA Brigadiers	EAC-ICA Lady Brigadiers
José Rizal University (JRU)	JRU Light Bombers	JRU Light Lady Bombers
La Salle Green Hills (LSGH)	La Salle Green Hills Greenies	La Salle Lady Greenies
Lyceum of the Philippines University – Cavite (LPU–C)	Lyceum Junior Pirates	Lyceum Junior Lady Pirates
Malayan High School of Science (MHSS)	Malayan Junior Spikers	—N/a
San Beda University – Rizal (SBU–R)	San Beda Junior Red Spikers	San Beda Baby Red Spikers
San Sebastian College – Recoletos (SSC–R)	San Sebastian Staglets	—N/a
University of Perpetual Help System DALTA (UPHSD)	Perpetual Junior Altas	Perpetual Junior Lady Altas

== Men's tournament ==
=== Team line-up ===
Arellano Chiefs
No.	Name	Position
1	AGOVIDA, Daniel Adonai	MB
2	GUINTO, Arman Clarence	OP
3	OSABEL, Ervin Patrick	OH
4	PANGILINAN, Jake	MB
5	SIMPAO, Matt Morgan	OH
6	CASTRO, Aaron Justine	L
7	DOMINGUITO, CJ	OH
8	DEFERIA, Keith Justine	L
9	SALVO, Laurence Andrei	S
11	CATERIA, Wainn Wojtyla	OH
12	SINUTO, Jiwen (c)	OP
13	CACULBA, Ashley Gabriel	S
14	BOCA, Dhan Alrhee	L
15	CABRERA, Bryan Jay	OP
21	DOMINGO, Ralph	MB
22	GARCIA, Arvin	MB
	Bryan Vitug	HC

Letran Knights
No.	Name	Position
1	HIMZON, Vince Virrey	MB
2	CUARTO, Edgin	OH
3	DE GUZMAN, Mark Raniel	OH
4	ARANO, John Wayne (c)	S
5	CORDERO, Luke	L
6	BERMIDO, Felix	OH
8	SUMAGAYSAY, John	S
9	ALECIDA, Kirby Vonn	L
10	MATIENZO, Beejay	MB
11	SANTIAGUDO, Jero	MB
12	BAUTISTA, John Derrick	OH
14	LARDIZABAL, Dave Thomas	MB
15	LOPEZ, Maximuz Paolo	OH
16	AMBROCIO, Christer Lou	OP
17	ABETO, Andrew	OP
21	DOMALANTA, Dennis	MB
	Brian Esquibel	HC

Benilde Blazing Spikers
No.	Name	Position
1	BETCO, Raymart	OP
2	JORDAN, Paul Amadeo	OH
5	VILLANUEVA, Chris Lorenz	S
6	MACAGALING, Mark Lawrence	MB
7	MALICDEM, Nolram	OH
8	REOLALAS, Joseph Benedict	OP
9	MOTOL, Rocky Roy	OP
11	SULAYMAN, Alvin	OH
12	BALBACAL, Adrian Mike	MB
14	GRANIADA, Dexter	OH
17	CUENCA, Jeremi Pierre	L
18	AUSTERO, Adrinnne John (c)	MB
19	RABANES, Al Bernard	S
22	BALDADO, Martin Daniel	L
24	ESTRADA, John Vincent	MB
	Arnold Laniog	HC

EAC Generals
No.	Name	Position
1	OLIVO, Joshua	OH
2	TAMAYO, Ralph Christian	S
3	ROSAGARAN, Edward Karlson	OP
5	MAGPANTAY, Jan Francis	L
6	APDAN, Aijhan	MB
7	PALATINO, Mark	S
8	TACULOG, Frelwin	OH
9	SANTIAGO, Basty	MB
10	SANTOS, Mark Joseph	L
11	GURA, Paul Edward	OP
14	ABOR, Jan Ruther (c)	OH
15	SARCAUGA, Franz Jamie	OP
16	GELA, Michael	MB
17	GABATIN, Jay	OP
18	SABELLA, Randy	OH
19	SAY, Paul Justine	OP
	Melchor Santos	HC

JRU Heavy Bombers
No.	Name	Position
1	PACHECO, Jemwill	MB
2	BARRIENTOS, Paolo	OH
3	YAP, Hugh Brion	OP
4	MACALACAO, Jeffrince Marco	MB
5	CAMAY, Rich Aldwin	L
6	OCHEA, Jerald Jeff	S
7	DATIG, Ivan	L
9	MALLILLIN, Mathew (c)	OP
10	BELLEN Jhon Cina	OH
11	FERNANDEZ, Jake Johnson	MB
12	DELA CRUZ, Charlie Jade	OH
14	UNDING, Al-jecradin	OP
15	OCAY, Harry Jim	MB
16	DAIS, Klause Alice	S
19	SAMPANG, Rhailey Kyen	OH
20	RAMIREZ, Joeric	OP
	Larry Sioco Jr.	HC

Lyceum Pirates
No.	Name	Position
1	EDANG, Gian Carlo	OH
2	AQUINO, Jhon Icon	OP
3	TALENTO, David Quer	MB
4	LANORIO, Mark Kenneth	MB
5	DIAZ, Kenneth	OP
6	DUMASIG, Chris Louie	S
7	EDANG, John Frank	OH
8	BLANCO, Ace Van Robnoel	L
9	SANTOS, Isiah Chrys	OH
10	DE GUZMAN, Rogel	OP
11	MORAL, Kian Carlo (c)	L
12	SEGUI, Charles Jordan	OH
13	CRUZ, John Vincent	OH
14	LANORIO, Mark Kenneth	MB
16	MARTINEZ, Khen Warren	S
19	MOJICA, Liam Clark	MB
	Ciarnelle Wanta	HC

Mapúa Cardinals
No.	Name	Position
1	QUEMADA, Zyldjan Ace	OP
2	JAMISOLA, Saint Marlowe	OH
3	VALENZUELA, Jayvee	MB
4	REYES, Patrick Jade	MB
5	MUSNGI, Adrian Patrick	OH
7	RAMOS, Ar-Jay	MB
8	BARBA, Juancho Joaquin	S
9	LARES, Dave Christian	L
11	YAP, Joseph Evan	OH
12	CABALLERO, Marc Joshua	L
13	SAN ANDRES, John Benedict (c)	OH
17	LAYUG, Jerimoen	OP
18	MACADANGDANG, Alvin	S
19	MANGULABNAN, Jan Frederick King	OH
20	CERVANINA, Westey	MB
21	GALICIA, John Cris	OH
	Clarence Esteban	HC

San Beda Red Spikers
No.	Name	Position
2	NANTES, Adrian	MB
3	LAUDIT, King	OP
4	YABO, Jhon	S
5	BAKIL, Anrie (c)	OP
6	BOOK, Axel Van	OH
7	MUNSING, Alener Greg	MB
8	DELA CRUZ, Eddie	MB
10	CABALSA, Ralph	OP
11	GALLANO, Gian	L
12	CASTAÑEDA, Dominic	S
14	IGNACIO Raniel	OP
15	TAHILUDDIN, Mohammed	OH
16	TEHONES, Junile	L
17	SAMUEL, Jainul	OH
18	ROSMAN, Ryan	OH
	Ariel Dela Cruz	HC

San Sebastian Stags
No.	Name	Position
1	BINONDO, Aaron Einstein	OH
2	VILLAMOR, Kyle Angelo (c)	OP
3	BUENAVENTURA, Ace	L
4	ARAÑO, Jen Kera	S
5	SARISARI, John Eric	MB
6	GAILNDO, Sarif	OH
7	DUGUEN, Jilbert	OH
8	ESCOTILLON, Lheann Andrie	OP
9	LEAL, Lorenzo Miguel	L
11	ESPENIDA, Joshua	S
12	ALBA, Rhenmart Christian	OH
14	RAFALLO, Lance Kristian	MB
16	SALI Zafrulla	MB
17	SANTOS, Justine	OH
18	LIM, Cedric Resty	MB
19	DULLETE, Eliemar	OP
	Boyet Delmoro	HC

Perpetual Altas Spikers
No.	Name	Position
1	SARMIENTO, James	MB
2	PALLASA, Charles	OP
3	PASCUA, James	MB
4	TANGON, Marc	OH
6	FAVILA Justin	S
7	MOHAMMAD, Zaih	OP
9	ASONIO, Ivan	OP
10	BORNEL, Jester (c)	MB
12	ALBON Jose	OH
13	JULATON, Ike	L
14	ANDRES Khian	OH
15	ARROZADO, Dexter	OH
16	CORPUZ, Army	MB
18	ABENOJA, Nash	L
19	CASTIL, John	OH
21	MATEO, Klint Michael	S
	Macky Cariño	HC

=== Group stage ===
==== Team standings ====
===== Group A =====
Pos	Team	Pld	W	L	Pts	SW	SL	SR	SPW	SPL	SPR	Qualification
1	Perpetual Altas Spikers	13	10	3	29	34	17	2.000	892	823	1.084	Twice-to-beat in the quarterfinals
2	Benilde Blazing Spikers	13	9	4	28	31	18	1.722	872	758	1.150	Twice-to-beat in the quarterfinals
3	Mapúa Cardinals	13	7	6	22	27	22	1.227	810	795	1.019	Twice-to-win in the quarterfinals
4	San Sebastian Stags	13	5	8	14	18	29	0.621	683	735	0.929	Proceed to play-in game
5	JRU Heavy Bombers	13	1	12	2	6	38	0.158	589	745	0.791	Proceed to play-in game

Source: GMA News
Rules for classification: 1) Number of wins; 2) match points; 3) sets ratio; 4) points ratio; 5) head-to-head record

===== Group B =====
Pos	Team	Pld	W	L	Pts	SW	SL	SR	SPW	SPL	SPR	Qualification
1	Arellano Chiefs	13	9	4	27	31	17	1.824	960	884	1.086	Twice-to-beat in the quarterfinals
2	San Beda Red Spikers	13	8	5	25	29	19	1.526	687	666	1.032	Twice-to-beat in the quarterfinals
3	EAC Generals	13	8	5	23	28	22	1.273	846	826	1.024	Twice-to-win in the quarterfinals
4	Letran Knights (H)	13	6	7	19	24	21	1.143	763	738	1.034	Proceed to play-in game
5	Lyceum Pirates	13	2	11	6	12	35	0.343	711	843	0.843	Proceed to play-in game

Source: GMA Integrated News
Rules for classification: 1) Number of wins; 2) match points; 3) sets ratio; 4) points ratio; 5) head-to-head record
(H) Host

==== Match-up results ====
Team ╲ Game	First phase				Second phase					Third phase			
Team ╲ Game	1	2	3	4	5	6	7	8	9	10	11	12	13
Arellano	Letran school colors	Lyceum school colors	San Beda school colors	EAC school colors	CSB school colors	UPHD school colors	JRU school colors	SSC-R school colors	Mapua school colors	Lyceum school colors	San Beda school colors	Letran school colors	EAC school colors
Letran	Arellano school colors	EAC school colors	Lyceum school colors	San Beda school colors	UPHD school colors	JRU school colors	SSC-R school colors	Mapua school colors	CSB school colors	EAC school colors	Lyceum school colors	Arellano school colors	San Beda school colors
Benilde	Mapua school colors	UPHD school colors	SSC-R school colors	JRU school colors	Arellano school colors	Lyceum school colors	San Beda school colors	EAC school colors	Letran school colors	UPHD school colors	SSC-R school colors	JRU school colors	Mapua school colors
EAC	Letran school colors	San Beda school colors	Lyceum school colors	Arellano school colors	UPHD school colors	JRU school colors	SSC-R school colors	Mapua school colors	CSB school colors	Letran school colors	San Beda school colors	Lyceum school colors	Arellano school colors
JRU	SSC-R school colors	UPHD school colors	Mapua school colors	CSB school colors	San Beda school colors	EAC school colors	Letran school colors	Arellano school colors	Lyceum school colors	SSC-R school colors	UPHD school colors	Mapua school colors	CSB school colors
Lyceum	San Beda school colors	Arellano school colors	Letran school colors	EAC school colors	SSC-R school colors	Mapua school colors	CSB school colors	UPHD school colors	JRU school colors	San Beda school colors	Arellano school colors	Letran school colors	EAC school colors
Mapúa	CSB school colors	SSC-R school colors	JRU school colors	UPHD school colors	Lyceum school colors	San Beda school colors	EAC school colors	Letran school colors	Arellano school colors	SSC-R school colors	JRU school colors	UPHD school colors	CSB school colors
San Beda	Lyceum school colors	EAC school colors	Arellano school colors	Letran school colors	JRU school colors	SSC-R school colors	Mapua school colors	CSB school colors	UPHD school colors	Lyceum school colors	EAC school colors	Arellano school colors	Letran school colors
San Sebastian	JRU school colors	Mapua school colors	CSB school colors	UPHD school colors	Lyceum school colors	San Beda school colors	EAC school colors	Letran school colors	Arellano school colors	JRU school colors	Mapua school colors	CSB school colors	UPHD school colors
Perpetual	CSB school colors	JRU school colors	SSC-R school colors	Mapua school colors	EAC school colors	Letran school colors	Arellano school colors	Lyceum school colors	San Beda school colors	CSB school colors	JRU school colors	SSC-R school colors	Mapua school colors

Source: GMA News
= Win; = Loss

Notes

- First phase = Intra-group round-robin
- Second phase = Inter-group crossover
- Third phase = Intra-group round-robin

==== Scores ====
Teams	AU	CSJL	CSB	EAC	JRU	LPU	MU	SBU	SSC–R	UPHSD
Arellano Chiefs		3–1	3–0	2–3	3–0	3–0	0–3	3–0	1–3	1–3
Letran Knights	2–3		0–3	3–0	3–0	3–1	3–1	1–3	3–0	1–3
Benilde Blazing Spikers	—	—		3–0	3–0	2–3	2–3	3–2	3–0	3–1
EAC Generals	0–3	3–0	—		3–0	3–1	3–0	3–2	3–2	2–3
JRU Heavy Bombers	—	—	1–3	—		0–3	1–3	1–3	0–3	3–2
Lyceum Pirates	1–3	0–3	—	0–3	—		1–3	0–3	2–3	1–3
Mapúa Cardinals	—	—	3–0	—	3–0	—		0–3	2–3	1–3
San Beda Red Spikers	1–3	3–0	—	3–2	—	3–0	—		3–0	0–3
San Sebastian Stags	—	—	1–3	—	3–0	—	0–3	—		1–3
Perpetual Altas Spikers	—	—	1–3	—	3–0	—	3–2	—	3–0	

Source: GMA News
Legend: Blue = left column team win; Red = top row team win.

Notes

- — = No contest. The third phase is played only within each group.

=== Bracket ===
Play-in games (Single-elimination)
B4	Letran	3
B5	Lyceum	0
A4	San Sebastian	3
A5	JRU	1

Quarterfinals (Top 2 twice-to-beat)
A1	Perpetual	1	1
B4	Letran	3	3
A2	Benilde	3
B3	EAC	2
B1	Arellano	3
A4	San Sebastian	1
B2	San Beda	1	1
A3	Mapúa	3	3

Semifinals (Best-of-three playoff)
B4	Letran	2	2
A2	Benilde	3	3
B1	Arellano	2	3	0
A3	Mapúa	3	1	3

Finals (Best-of-three playoff)
A2	Benilde	1	3	3
A3	Mapúa	3	2	0
Third place playoff
B4	Letran	3
B1	Arellano	2

=== Play-in games ===
The teams that finished fourth and fifth in their respective groups will play each other for a quarterfinal berths.

Date	Time	Venue		Score		Set 1	Set 2	Set 3	Set 4	Set 5	Total	Report
A4 vs A5
Mar 13	09:00	SAS	San Sebastian Stags	3–1	JRU Heavy Bombers	25–22	21–25	25–15	25–18		96–80	
B4 vs B5
Mar 13	17:00	SAS	Letran Knights	3–0	Lyceum Pirates	25–14	25–16	25–20			75–50	

=== Quarterfinals ===
The teams that finished first and second in their respective groups will have the twice-to-beat advantage in the crossover quarterfinals.

Team 1	Series	Team 2	Game 1	Game 2
Perpetual Altas Spikers *	0–2	Letran Knights	1–3	1–3
Benilde Blazing Spikers *	1–0	EAC Generals	3–2	—
Arellano Chiefs *	1–0	San Sebastian Stags	3–1	—
San Beda Red Spikers *	0–2	Mapúa Cardinals	1–3	1–3

* = Team has twice-to-beat advantage. Team 1 only has to win once, while Team 2 has to win twice.

Date	Time	Venue		Score		Set 1	Set 2	Set 3	Set 4	Set 5	Total	Report
Game 1
Mar 15	09:00	SAS	Perpetual Altas Spikers	1–3	Letran Knights	25–17	21–25	15–25	23–25		84–92	
Mar 15	17:00	SAS	Arellano Chiefs	3–1	San Sebastian Stags	25–12	25–16	23–25	25–18		98–71	
Mar 17	08:00	SAS	Benilde Blazing Spikers	3–2	EAC Generals	19–25	27–25	25–21	23–25	15–12	109–108	
Mar 17	17:00	SAS	San Beda Red Spikers	1–3	Mapúa Cardinals	25–15	21–25	28–30	24–26		98–96	
Game 2
Mar 18	11:00	SG	Letran Knights	3–1	Perpetual Altas Spikers	27–29	25–11	25–23	25–18		102–81	
Mar 20	11:00	ASA	Mapúa Cardinals	3–1	San Beda Red Spikers	25–14	22–25	26–24	25–21		98–84	

=== Semifinals ===
The semifinals are a best of three playoff.

Team 1	Series	Team 2	Game 1	Game 2	Game 3
Benilde Blazing Spikers	2–0	Letran Knights	3–2	3–2	—
Arellano Chiefs	1–2	Mapúa Cardinals	2–3	3–1	0–3

Date	Time	Venue		Score		Set 1	Set 2	Set 3	Set 4	Set 5	Total	Report
Game 1
Mar 24	11:05	SAS	Benilde Blazing Spikers	3–2	Letran Knights	25–21	22–25	25–22	20–25	15–13	107–106	
Mar 24	14:30	SAS	Arellano Chiefs	2–3	Mapúa Cardinals	20–25	24–26	25–18	25–21	12–15	106–105	
Game 2
Mar 27	12:00	SAS	Mapúa Cardinals	1–3	Arellano Chiefs	16–25	22–25	25–22	17–25		80–97	
Mar 27	14:30	SAS	Letran Knights	2–3	Benilde Blazing Spikers	25–19	24–26	25–21	23–25	9–15	106–106	
Game 3
Mar 29	14:30	EAC	Arellano Chiefs	0–3	Mapúa Cardinals	21–25	20–25	20–25			61–75	

=== Third place playoff ===
A third place playoff will be played by the semifinals losers.

Date	Time	Venue		Score		Set 1	Set 2	Set 3	Set 4	Set 5	Total	Report
Apr 5	09:00	RMC	Letran Knights	3–2	Arellano Chiefs	21–25	24–26	25–19	25–23	15–13	110–106	

=== Finals ===
The finals is a best of three playoff.

Date	Time	Venue		Score		Set 1	Set 2	Set 3	Set 4	Set 5	Total	Report
Apr 5	15:00	RMC	Benilde Blazing Spikers	1–3	Mapúa Cardinals	25–19	23–25	21–25	23–25		92–94	
Apr 8	11:00	RMC	Mapúa Cardinals	2–3	Benilde Blazing Spikers	18–25	21–25	25–22	25–20	9–15	98–107	
Apr 10	12:00	RMC	Benilde Blazing Spikers	3–0	Mapúa Cardinals	25–23	25–18	25–21			75–62	

- Finals MVP: Reymark Betco (Benilde Blazing Spikers)
- Coach of the Year: Arnold Laniog (Benilde Blazing Spikers)

=== Awards ===
NCAA Season 101 men's volleyball champions
Benilde Blazers
Second title

- Most Valuable Player: Axel Van Book (San Beda Red Spikers)
- Rookie of the Year: Marc Lemuel Tangon (Perpetual Altas Spikers)
- Freshman of the Year: Marc Lemuel Tangon (Perpetual Altas Spikers)
- 1st best outside spiker: Rocky Roy Motol (Benilde Blazing Spikers)
  - 2nd best outside spiker: John Derrick Bautista (Letran Knights)
- 1st best middle blocker: Vince Virrey Himzon (Letran Knights)
  - 2nd best middle blocker: Jester Bornel (Perpetual Altas Spikers)
- Best opposite spiker: Reymark Betco (Benilde Blazing Spikers)
- Best setter: Laurence Andrei Salvo (Arellano Chiefs)
- Best Libero: Ace Buenaventura (San Sebastian Stags)

==== Players of the Week ====
The Collegiate Press Corps awards a "player of the week" on Mondays for performances on the preceding week.

Week	Player	Team	Ref.
Week 1	CJ Dominguito	Arellano Chiefs	
Week 2	Jan Ruther Abor	EAC Generals	
Week 3	Klint Mateo	Perpetual Altas Spikers	
Week 4	Raymark Betco	Benilde Blazing Spikers	
Week 5	Axel Van Book	San Beda Red Spikers	
Week 6	CJ Dominguito	Arellano Chiefs	

== Women's tournament ==
=== Team line-up ===
Arellano Lady Chiefs
No.	Name	Position
1	FLORIDA, Cassey Leona	OP
2	TIRATIRA, Samantha Gabrielle	MB
4	CAFE, Sheena	S
6	PABLO, Khey Aleck	L
7	TUDLASAN, Laika	OH
8	CAGUICLA, Alona Nicole (c)	L
9	MAGALING, Mauie Joyce	OH
10	PADILLON, Marianne Lei Angelique	OH
11	ABITRIA, Keisha Alexa	OH
12	CEBALLOS, Harem	L
13	MANGUBAT, Fhaye	MB
14	VILLAFLORES, Heart	OH
15	DOMASIG, Catherine	S
16	PUNZALAN, Kacelyn	MB
17	SEGOVIA, Desaela Gae	MB
18	SERVIDAD, Crisanta	OP
20	ANTANG, Ramyshane	OH
	Roberto Javier	HC

Letran Lady Knights
No.	Name	Position
1	NITURA, Marie Judiel	OP
4	NAPAL, Marjorie	MB
6	PADILLA, Leonilyn	MB
7	MARTIN, Nizelle Aeriyen	OH
8	TUMAYAO, Princes Zyne	S
9	PANANGIN, Joralyn	OH
10	ESTRELLER, Natalie Marie	S
12	COLENDRA, Verenicce	OP
14	ENVERGA, Marbey Allen	L
15	SARIE, Sheena Vanessa	OH
16	ISAR, Lastille Jade	MB
17	FLORES, Hizki	S
18	BRAGO, Edcynth Pearl	OP
19	SILVA, Lara Mae (c)	L
23	SILORIO, Syra Joy	MB
25	MAQUILANG, Gia Marcel	OH
	Mayette Carolino	HC

Benilde Lady Blazers
No.	Name	Position
1	BASARTE, Chenae (c)	S
2	BARTOLOME, Camila Amor	MB
5	GETIGAN, Fiona	L
6	BASILIO, Zen Reina	S
7	FLORES, Francis Mae	OH
9	DENSING, Rhea Mae	OP
10	BADION, Sophia Margarette	MB
11	LLESES, Shekaina Rhedge	OH
12	LLESES, Shahanna Rheign	OH
14	ROJO, Yesha Keith	OP
15	INOCENTES, Fionna Marie	MB
16	CATARIG, Clydel Mae	OP
17	DOROG, Jessa	L
18	ONDANGAN, Cristy	MB/OP
21	NOLASCO, Zamantha	MB
24	ALMONIA, Angel Mae	OH
25	BAGA-AN, Icy Kaye	MB
	Jerry Yee	HC

EAC Lady Generals
No.	Name	Position
2	DEQUILLA, Marielle	S
3	LUT, Georgeena	S
4	DE ANDRES, Karyle Rae (c)	L
6	SAYAGO, Jaed Nicole	MB
7	DAYANAN, Cara Xia Xyra	OP
8	GARCIA, Gekeshzra	L
9	BODONAL, Erica Maye	OH
10	RAMOS, Marinel	MB
11	DEQUILLA, Trisha	OP
13	DATU, Lhaine Angel	MB
14	DOMO, Florence Jane	OH
15	PEREZ, Angel Joy	OH
18	RAZONABLE, Alessandra Julienne	OH/OP
19	ALIMEN, Eliza Mae	OH
20	BALASAN, Jasmine Therese	MB
22	PASAOL, Mae Angelica	OH
25	TORIADO, Ashley Corisse	MB
	Kirk Ong	HC

JRU Lady Bombers
No.	Name	Position
2	RELOJ, Jaylynna	OH
3	DUNGCA, Bianca Denise	OH
4	ORBILLO, Princess	S
5	ALONA, Marianne	L
6	LAPATING, Feona	OP
7	SUAMER, Eurieca	OP
8	DEALA, Nicole Grace	OH/OP
9	CARABOT, Liezel Kaye	L
10	RAMOS, Czarina	OH
11	AMANTE, Constancia Aurea	MB
12	YONGCO, Angelica Mae	OH
14	LALONGISIP, Ma Rachel Ann	OH
15	NAVARRA, Kyla	S
16	BATARA, Khreiszantha Gayle (c)	MB
18	SANTOS, Bea Bianca	MB
19	DIMATAWARAN, Jullia	OH/MB
	Mia Tioseco	HC

Lyceum Lady Pirates
No.	Name	Position
1	BANARES, Monna Sherina	L
2	GUZMAN, Angelica Blue	L
4	DE GUZMAN, Joann Faeith	OH
5	RUAZOL, Kelly Lorrine	L
6	TULANG, Janeth	OP
8	LOPEZ, Stacey Denise	OH
9	DELA CRUZ, Roxie	OH
10	BIO, Heart	MB
11	GALEDO, Katrina Paula (c)	S
12	PASCUAL, Sheila Marie	OH
13	TAGHOY, Gynwyth	S
15	DOLORITO, Johna Denise	OH
16	OSADA, Hiromi	MB
17	ALBERTO, Hilalhia Kira	MB
19	GAURANA, Ayah Isabelle	MB
20	MUCHILLAS, Ashley	OP
	Cromwel Garcia	HC

Mapúa Lady Cardinals
No.	Name	Position
2	RICABLANCA, Raissa Janel	OP
3	CAYANAN, Svetlana Crystal Joan	OH
4	GARCIA, Freighanne Seanelle	OH
5	MARCOS, Clarence	MB
6	REBUSTES, Princess	L
7	GAVICA, Angellick Gem	S
8	YAP, Laurene Alexis	MB
9	YABUT, Diandrah	MB
10	MANARANG, Princess Jeline	S
11	ONG, Alyanna Nicole (c)	MB
12	TAMBASACAN, Ma. Theresa	OH
13	GACULA, Freebie Alejandra	L
14	ESTEBAN, Franchesca Claris	OP
15	LEABRES, Alexander	OH
16	BERCES, Nadine Angeli	OH
18	DE GUZMAN, Hannah	OP
	Clarence Esteban	HC

San Beda Lady Red Spikers
No.	Name	Position
1	HABACON, Angel Mae (c)	OH
3	ESPINA, Gina	S
4	BIONG, Amber Lily	L
5	CASTILLO, Chynna Allyson	OH
7	CATUBIG, Jeliane May	OH
8	MOLINA, Katleya Jewel	OP
9	BACHAR, Janelle	OP
12	DELA CRUZ, Sofia Katrina	OH
13	JONIEGA, Jermaine Ann	MB
14	CAMPOS, Angel Joy	L
15	HIPONIA, Patricia Grace	S
16	NAVARRO, Erin Feliz	MB
17	CUSTORIO, Ma Beatriz	MB
19	CABALLERO, Kiera Lyn	MB/OP
20	GUANZON, Gracie	OH
	Kungfu Reyes	HC

San Sebastian Lady Stags
No.	Name	Position
1	SANTOS, Katherine	OH
2	DIONISIO, Kristine Joy	MB
3	RAMOS, Princess Sofia	MB
4	MARASIGAN, Christina	OP
5	GARCIA, Divine Roshielle	OH
6	LOMIBAO, Jassy Lei	MB
7	RUIZ, Sofiah Leigh	MB
8	BALAJADIA, Jercine Mae (c)	S
9	LAZARTE, Chloi Florenci	L
10	ABRAHAM, Kleiner Ross	OP
11	DEPOSOY, Zenith Joy	OH
12	GONZALES, Juna May	OH
13	GUILLERO, Yden Iona	S
14	PULMONES, Trisha Mae	L
15	IGANCIO, Daniella Tricia	MB
16	PASTRANA, October	L
	Roger Gorayeb	HC

Perpetual Lady Altas
No.	Name	Position
1	LOZANO, Joanna Denise	L
2	ENRICO, Charisse Mae (c)	MB
3	FRANCIA, Kristine Reyn	OH
4	OMIPON, Shaila Allaine	OH
5	REYES, Pauline Mae	OP
6	VILLANUEVA, Liz Alexie	OH
7	ALMENIANA, Cyrille Joie	OP
8	LAGMAY, Jazhryll Loraine	MB
9	PALACIO, Geraldine Rae	MB
11	BUSTAMANTE, Camille	OP
12	ARIOLA, Fianne Istle	S
14	ROSALES, Virginia Ann	OH
15	MENOR, Jemalyn	OH
16	ATLAS, Chelzea Mae	OP
18	GAA, Nicole Jhane	S
19	GAA, Nicollete Anne	S
20	GECOBE, Desiree	L
	Sandy Rieta	HC

=== Group stage ===
==== Team standings ====
===== Group A =====
Pos	Team	Pld	W	L	Pts	SW	SL	SR	SPW	SPL	SPR	Qualification
1	Perpetual Lady Altas	13	11	2	30	33	14	2.357	771	689	1.119	Twice-to-beat in the quarterfinals
2	Benilde Lady Blazers	13	10	3	31	36	14	2.571	790	652	1.212	Twice-to-beat in the quarterfinals
3	Mapúa Lady Cardinals	13	5	8	16	24	31	0.774	931	956	0.974	Twice-to-win in the quarterfinals
4	San Sebastian Lady Stags	13	5	8	15	19	29	0.655	742	794	0.935	Proceed to play-in game
5	JRU Lady Bombers	13	2	11	7	16	37	0.432	772	913	0.846	Proceed to play-in game

Source: GMA Integrated News
Rules for classification: 1) Number of wins; 2) match points; 3) sets ratio; 4) points ratio; 5) head-to-head record

===== Group B =====
Pos	Team	Pld	W	L	Pts	SW	SL	SR	SPW	SPL	SPR	Qualification
1	Letran Lady Knights (H)	13	13	0	36	39	8	4.875	872	700	1.246	Twice-to-beat in the quarterfinals
2	San Beda Lady Red Spikers	13	9	4	27	32	18	1.778	659	608	1.084	Twice-to-beat in the quarterfinals
3	Arellano Lady Chiefs	13	6	7	19	25	25	1.000	929	925	1.004	Twice-to-win in the quarterfinals
4	Lyceum Lady Pirates	13	4	9	11	15	32	0.469	720	837	0.860	Proceed to play-in game
5	EAC Lady Generals	13	0	13	3	8	39	0.205	730	853	0.856	Proceed to play-in game

Source: GMA Integrated News
Rules for classification: 1) Number of wins; 2) match points; 3) sets ratio; 4) points ratio; 5) head-to-head record
(H) Host

==== Match-up results ====
Team ╲ Game	First phase				Second phase					Third phase			
Team ╲ Game	1	2	3	4	5	6	7	8	9	10	11	12	13
Arellano	Letran school colors	Lyceum school colors	San Beda school colors	EAC school colors	CSB school colors	UPHD school colors	JRU school colors	SSC-R school colors	Mapua school colors	Lyceum school colors	San Beda school colors	Letran school colors	EAC school colors
Letran	Arellano school colors	EAC school colors	Lyceum school colors	San Beda school colors	UPHD school colors	JRU school colors	SSC-R school colors	Mapua school colors	CSB school colors	EAC school colors	Lyceum school colors	Arellano school colors	San Beda school colors
Benilde	Mapua school colors	UPHD school colors	SSC-R school colors	JRU school colors	Arellano school colors	Lyceum school colors	San Beda school colors	EAC school colors	Letran school colors	UPHD school colors	SSC-R school colors	JRU school colors	Mapua school colors
EAC	Letran school colors	San Beda school colors	Lyceum school colors	Arellano school colors	UPHD school colors	JRU school colors	SSC-R school colors	Mapua school colors	CSB school colors	Letran school colors	San Beda school colors	Lyceum school colors	Arellano school colors
JRU	SSC-R school colors	UPHD school colors	Mapua school colors	CSB school colors	San Beda school colors	EAC school colors	Letran school colors	Arellano school colors	Lyceum school colors	SSC-R school colors	UPHD school colors	Mapua school colors	CSB school colors
Lyceum	San Beda school colors	Arellano school colors	Letran school colors	EAC school colors	SSC-R school colors	Mapua school colors	CSB school colors	UPHD school colors	JRU school colors	San Beda school colors	Arellano school colors	Letran school colors	EAC school colors
Mapúa	CSB school colors	SSC-R school colors	JRU school colors	UPHD school colors	Lyceum school colors	San Beda school colors	EAC school colors	Letran school colors	Arellano school colors	SSC-R school colors	JRU school colors	UPHD school colors	CSB school colors
San Beda	Lyceum school colors	EAC school colors	Arellano school colors	Letran school colors	JRU school colors	SSC-R school colors	Mapua school colors	CSB school colors	UPHD school colors	Lyceum school colors	EAC school colors	Arellano school colors	Letran school colors
San Sebastian	JRU school colors	Mapua school colors	CSB school colors	UPHD school colors	Lyceum school colors	San Beda school colors	EAC school colors	Letran school colors	Arellano school colors	JRU school colors	Mapua school colors	CSB school colors	UPHD school colors
Perpetual	CSB school colors	JRU school colors	SSC-R school colors	Mapua school colors	EAC school colors	Letran school colors	Arellano school colors	Lyceum school colors	San Beda school colors	CSB school colors	JRU school colors	SSC-R school colors	Mapua school colors

Source: GMA Integrated News
= Win; = Loss

Notes

- First phase = Intra-group round-robin
- Second phase = Inter-group crossover
- Third phase = Intra-group round-robin

==== Scores ====
Teams	AU	CSJL	CSB	EAC	JRU	LPU	MU	SBU	SSC–R	UPHSD
Arellano Lady Chiefs		0–3	1–3	3–0	3–1	3–0	2–3	0–3	1–3	1–3
Letran Lady Knights	3–2		3–2	3–0	3–0	3–0	3–1	3–1	3–0	3–0
Benilde Lady Blazers	—	—		3–0	3–0	3–0	3–2	2–3	3–0	2–3
EAC Lady Generals	1–3	2–3	—		2–3	0–3	1–3	0–3	0–3	0–3
JRU Lady Bombers	—	—	0–3	—		3–2	1–3	2–3	1–3	0–3
Lyceum Lady Pirates	0–3	0–3	—	3–2	—		3–2	1–3	3–1	1–3
Mapúa Lady Cardinals	—	—	0–3	—	3–2	—		1–3	3–1	0–3
San Beda Lady Red Spikers	2–3	0–3	—	3–0	—	3–0	—		3–0	2–3
San Sebastian Lady Stags	—	—	2–3	—	3–2	—	3–1	—		0–3
Perpetual Lady Altas	—	—	0–3	—	3–0	—	3–2	—	3–0	

Source: GMA Integrated News
Legend: Blue = left column team win; Red = top row team win.

Notes

- — = No contest. The third phase is played only within each group.

=== Bracket ===
Play-in games (Single-elimination)
B4	Lyceum	0
B5	EAC	3
A4	San Sebastian	3
A5	JRU	1

Quarterfinals (Top 2 twice-to-beat)
A1	Perpetual	1	3
B5	EAC	3	0
A2	Benilde	3
B3	Arellano	1
B1	Letran	3
A4	San Sebastian	1
B2	San Beda	0	3
A3	Mapúa	3	2

Semifinals (Best-of-three playoff)
A1	Perpetual	2	0
A2	Benilde	3	3
B1	Letran	3	1	3
B2	San Beda	1	3	1

Finals (Best-of-three playoff)
A2	Benilde	2	3	2
B1	Letran	3	0	3
Third place playoff
A1	Perpetual	3
B2	San Beda	0

=== Play-in games ===
The teams that finished fourth and fifth in their respective groups will play each other for a quarterfinal berths.

Date	Time	Venue		Score		Set 1	Set 2	Set 3	Set 4	Set 5	Total	Report
A4 vs A5
Mar 13	12:00	SAS	San Sebastian Lady Stags	3–1	JRU Lady Bombers	25–23	12–25	25–17	25–22		87–87	
B4 vs B5
Mar 13	14:30	SAS	Lyceum Lady Pirates	0–3	EAC Lady Generals	23–25	16–25	24–26			63–76	

=== Quarterfinals ===
The teams that finished first and second in their respective groups will have the twice-to-beat advantage in the crossover quarterfinals.

Team 1	Series	Team 2	Game 1	Game 2
Perpetual Lady Altas *	1–1	EAC Lady Generals	1–3	3–0
Benilde Lady Blazers *	1–0	Arellano Lady Chiefs	3–1	—
Letran Lady Knights *	1–0	San Sebastian Lady Stags	3–1	—
San Beda Lady Red Spikers *	1–1	Mapúa Lady Cardinals	0–3	3–2

* = Team has twice-to-beat advantage. Team 1 only has to win once, while Team 2 has to win twice.

Date	Time	Venue		Score		Set 1	Set 2	Set 3	Set 4	Set 5	Total	Report
Game 1
Mar 15	12:00	SAS	Perpetual Lady Altas	1–3	EAC Lady Generals	18–25	25–19	25–27	22–25		90–96	
Mar 15	14:30	SAS	Letran Lady Knights	3–1	San Sebastian Lady Stags	28–26	12–25	25–14	25–22		90–87	
Mar 17	11:00	SAS	Benilde Lady Blazers	3–1	Arellano Lady Chiefs	22–25	25–15	25–23	25–17		97–80	
Mar 17	14:30	SAS	San Beda Lady Red Spikers	0–3	Mapúa Lady Cardinals	22–25	22–25	21–25			65–75	
Game 2
Mar 18	14:30	SG	EAC Lady Generals	0–3	Perpetual Lady Altas	12–25	19–25	18–25			49–75	
Mar 20	14:30	ASA	Mapúa Lady Cardinals	2–3	San Beda Lady Red Spikers	21–25	26–24	25–21	26–28	13–15	111–113	

=== Semifinals ===
The semifinals are a best of three playoff.

Team 1	Series	Team 2	Game 1	Game 2	Game 3
Letran Lady Knights	2–1	San Beda Lady Red Spikers	3–1	1–3	3–1
Perpetual Lady Altas	0–2	Benilde Lady Blazers	2–3	0–3	—

Date	Time	Venue		Score		Set 1	Set 2	Set 3	Set 4	Set 5	Total	Report
Game 1
Mar 22	12:00	SG	Letran Lady Knights	3–1	San Beda Lady Red Spikers	20–25	28–26	25–21	28–26		101–98	
Mar 22	14:30	SG	Perpetual Lady Altas	2–3	Benilde Lady Blazers	17–25	25–18	27–25	19–25	8–15	96–108	
Game 2
Mar 25	11:00	SAS	Benilde Lady Blazers	3–0	Perpetual Lady Altas	25–18	26–24	25–21			76–63	
Mar 25	14:30	SAS	San Beda Lady Red Spikers	3–1	Letran Lady Knights	25–17	21–25	25–23	25–21		96–86	
Game 3
Mar 28	14:30	SAS	Letran Lady Knights	3–1	San Beda Lady Red Spikers	25–18	25–19	23–25	25–21		98–83	

=== Third place playoff ===
A third place playoff will be played by the semifinals losers.

Date	Time	Venue		Score		Set 1	Set 2	Set 3	Set 4	Set 5	Total	Report
Apr 8	07:30	RMC	Perpetual Lady Altas	3–0	San Beda Lady Red Spikers	25–18	25–18	26–24			76–60	

=== Finals ===
The finals is a best of three playoff.

Date	Time	Venue		Score		Set 1	Set 2	Set 3	Set 4	Set 5	Total	Report
Apr 5	12:00	RMC	Benilde Lady Blazers	2–3	Letran Lady Knights	25–17	23–25	25–20	14–25	11–15	98–102	
Apr 8	14:30	RMC	Letran Lady Knights	0–3	Benilde Lady Blazers	18–25	21–25	25–27			64–77	
Apr 10	15:00	RMC	Benilde Lady Blazers	2–3	Letran Lady Knights	25–15	17–25	24–26	25–17	12–15	103–98	

- Finals MVP: Marie Judiel Nitura (Letran Lady Knights)
- Coach of the Year: Mayeth Carolino (Letran Lady Knights)

=== Awards ===
NCAA Season 101 women's volleyball champions
Letran Lady Knights
Ninth title

- Most Valuable Player: Zamantha Nolasco (Benilde Lady Blazers)
- Rookie of the Year: Camilla Amor Bartolome (Benilde Lady Blazers)
- Freshman of the Year: Camilla Amor Bartolome (Benilde Lady Blazers)
- 1st best outside spiker: Angel Mae Habacon (San Beda Lady Red Spikers)
  - 2nd best outside spiker: Shekaina Redge Lleses (Benilde Lady Blazers)
- 1st best middle blocker: Zamantha Nolasco (Benilde Lady Blazers)
  - 2nd best middle blocker: Ashley Corisse Toriado (EAC Lady Generals)
- Best opposite spiker: Marie Judiel Nitura (Letran Lady Knights)
- Best setter: Chenae Basarte (Benilde Lady Blazers)
- Best Libero: Lara Mae Silva (Letran Lady Knights)

==== Players of the Week ====
The Collegiate Press Corps awards a "player of the week" on Mondays for performances on the preceding week.

Week	Player	Team	Ref.
Week 1	Cyrille Almeniana	Perpetual Lady Altas	
Week 2	Johna Dolorito	Lyceum Lady Pirates	
Week 3	Angel Habacon	San Beda Lady Red Spikers	
Week 4	Gia Marcel Maquilang	Letran Lady Knights	
Week 5	Judiel Nitura	Letran Lady Knights	
Week 6	Vanessa Sarie	Letran Lady Knights	

== Boys' tournament ==
=== Group stage ===
==== Team standings ====
===== Group A =====
Pos	Team	Pld	W	L	Pts	SW	SL	SR	SPW	SPL	SPR	Qualification
1	Malayan Junior Spikers	13	11	2	33	36	11	3.273	309	307	1.007	Twice-to-beat in the quarterfinals
2	Perpetual Junior Altas	13	11	2	32	35	13	2.692	350	294	1.190	Twice-to-beat in the quarterfinals
3	EAC–ICA Brigadiers	13	6	7	17	23	29	0.793	360	348	1.034	Twice-to-win in the quarterfinals
4	San Sebastian Staglets	12	4	8	13	20	29	0.690	363	394	0.921	Proceed to play-in game
5	San Beda Junior Red Spikers	12	2	10	8	11	31	0.355	323	364	0.887	Proceed to play-in game

Source: GMA Integrated News
Rules for classification: 1) Number of wins; 2) match points; 3) sets ratio; 4) points ratio; 5) head-to-head record

===== Group B =====
Pos	Team	Pld	W	L	Pts	SW	SL	SR	SPW	SPL	SPR	Qualification
1	Letran Squires	13	11	2	32	35	9	3.889	321	256	1.254	Twice-to-beat in the quarterfinals
2	Arellano Braves (H)	12	9	3	27	31	11	2.818	233	208	1.120	Twice-to-beat in the quarterfinals
3	JRU Light Bombers	12	5	7	17	19	23	0.826	316	328	0.963	Twice-to-win in the quarterfinals
4	Lyceum Junior Pirates	13	2	11	6	10	33	0.303	259	309	0.838	Proceed to play-in game
5	La Salle Green Hills Greenies	13	2	11	4	6	37	0.162	296	294	1.007	Proceed to play-in game

Source: GMA Integrated News
Rules for classification: 1) Number of wins; 2) match points; 3) sets ratio; 4) points ratio; 5) head-to-head record
(H) Host

==== Match-up results ====
Team ╲ Game	First phase				Second phase					Third phase			
Team ╲ Game	1	2	3	4	5	6	7	8	9	10	11	12	13
Arellano	CSB school colors	Lyceum school colors	JRU school colors	Letran school colors	SSC-R school colors	San Beda school colors	EAC school colors	Mapua school colors	UPHD school colors	CSB school colors	Lyceum school colors	JRU school colors	Letran school colors
Letran	JRU school colors	CSB school colors	Lyceum school colors	Arellano school colors	Mapua school colors	San Beda school colors	EAC school colors	SSC-R school colors	UPHD school colors	JRU school colors	CSB school colors	Lyceum school colors	Arellano school colors
EAC–ICA	UPHD school colors	San Beda school colors	Mapua school colors	SSC-R school colors	Lyceum school colors	CSB school colors	Letran school colors	Arellano school colors	JRU school colors	UPHD school colors	San Beda school colors	Mapua school colors	SSC-R school colors
JRU	Letran school colors	CSB school colors	Arellano school colors	Lyceum school colors	San Beda school colors	SSC-R school colors	Mapua school colors	UPHD school colors	EAC school colors	Letran school colors	CSB school colors	Arellano school colors	Lyceum school colors
LSGH	Arellano school colors	Letran school colors	JRU school colors	Lyceum school colors	EAC school colors	SSC-R school colors	Mapua school colors	San Beda school colors	UPHD school colors	Arellano school colors	Letran school colors	JRU school colors	Lyceum school colors
Lyceum–Cavite	Arellano school colors	Letran school colors	CSB school colors	JRU school colors	EAC school colors	Mapua school colors	UPHD school colors	SSC-R school colors	San Beda school colors	Arellano school colors	Letran school colors	CSB school colors	JRU school colors
Malayan	San Beda school colors	SSC-R school colors	EAC school colors	UPHD school colors	Letran school colors	Lyceum school colors	JRU school colors	CSB school colors	Arellano school colors	San Beda school colors	SSC-R school colors	EAC school colors	UPHD school colors
San Beda–Rizal	Mapua school colors	UPHD school colors	EAC school colors	SSC-R school colors	JRU school colors	Letran school colors	Arellano school colors	CSB school colors	Lyceum school colors	Mapua school colors	UPHD school colors	EAC school colors	SSC-R school colors
San Sebastian	Mapua school colors	UPHD school colors	San Beda school colors	EAC school colors	Arellano school colors	JRU school colors	CSB school colors	Letran school colors	Lyceum school colors	Mapua school colors	UPHD school colors	San Beda school colors	EAC school colors
Perpetual	EAC school colors	San Beda school colors	SSC-R school colors	Mapua school colors	Lyceum school colors	JRU school colors	Letran school colors	CSB school colors	Arellano school colors	EAC school colors	San Beda school colors	SSC-R school colors	Mapua school colors

Source: GMA Integrated News
= Win; = Loss

Notes

- First phase = Intra-group round-robin
- Second phase = Inter-group crossover
- Third phase = Intra-group round-robin

==== Scores ====
Teams	AU	CSJL	EAC–ICA	JRU	LSGH	LPU–C	MHSS	SBU–R	SSC–R	UPHSD
Arellano Braves		1–3	3–2	3–0	3–0	3–0	1–3	3–0	3–0	3–0
Letran Squires	3–2		3–0	3–0	3–0	3–0	1–3	3–0	3–0	1–3
EAC–ICA Brigadiers	—	—		3–0	2–3	3–1	1–3	3–2	3–2	0–3
JRU Light Bombers	0–3	0–3	—		2–3	3–1	0–3	3–0	3–1	2–3
La Salle Green Hills Greenies	0–3	0–3	—	0–3		0–3	0–3	0–3	0–3	0–3
Lyceum Junior Pirates	0–3	0–3	—	0–3	3–0		0–3	1–3	1–3	0–3
Malayan Junior Spikers	—	—	3–0	—	—	—		3–0	3–0	3–2
San Beda Junior Red Spikers	—	–	1–3	—	—	—	0–3		2–3	0–3
San Sebastian Staglets	—	—	2–3	—	—	—	3–2	3–0		2–3
Perpetual Junior Altas	—	—	3–0	—	—	—	3–1	3–0	3–1	

Source: GMA Integrated News
Legend: Blue = left column team win; Red = top row team win.

Notes

- — = No contest. The third phase is played only within each group.

=== Bracket ===
Play-in games (Single-elimination)
B4	Lyceum–Cavite	3
B5	LSGH	2
A4	San Sebastian	3
A5	San Beda–Rizal	2

Quarterfinals (Top 2 twice-to-beat)
A1	Malayan	3
B4	Lyceum–Cavite	0
A2	Perpetual	3
B3	JRU	1
B1	Letran	3
A4	San Sebastian	0
B2	Arellano	3
A3	EAC–ICA	0

Semifinals (Best-of-three playoff)
A1	Malayan	3	3
A2	Perpetual	1	0
B1	Letran	3	3
B2	Arellano	0	2

Finals (Best-of-three playoff)
A1	Malayan	3	3
B1	Letran	1	1
Third place playoff
A2	Perpetual	0
B2	Arellano	3

- Finals MVP: Roderick Medino (Mapúa Red Robins)
- Coach of the Year: Ralph Ocampo (Mapúa Red Robins)

=== Awards ===
NCAA Season 101 boys' volleyball champions
Mapúa Red Robins
Second title

- Most Valuable Player:
- Rookie of the Year:
- Freshman of the Year:
- 1st best outside spiker:
  - 2nd best outside spiker:
- 1st best middle blocker:
  - 2nd best middle blocker:
- Best opposite spiker:
- Best setter:
- Best Libero:

== Girls' tournament ==
=== Elimination round ===
==== Team standings ====
Pos	Team	Pld	W	L	Pts	SW	SL	SR	SPW	SPL	SPR	Qualification
1	Perpetual Junior Lady Altas	6	6	0	16	12	2	6.000	100	51	1.961	Twice-to-beat in the semifinals
2	Arellano Lady Braves (H)	6	5	1	15	10	2	5.000	75	32	2.344	Twice-to-beat in the semifinals
3	EAC–ICA Lady Brigadiers	6	4	2	12	9	5	1.800	100	70	1.429	Twice-to-win in the semifinals
4	Lyceum Junior Lady Pirates	6	3	3	10	8	6	1.333	55	71	0.775	Twice-to-win in the semifinals
5	San Beda Baby Red Spikers	6	2	4	5	4	9	0.444	50	100	0.500	
6	La Salle Lady Greenies	6	1	5	4	3	8	0.375	49	100	0.490	
7	JRU Light Lady Bombers	6	0	6	0	0	12	0.000	47	75	0.627	

Source: GMA Integrated News
Rules for classification: 1) Number of wins; 2) match points; 3) sets ratio; 4) points ratio; 5) head-to-head record
(H) Host

==== Match-up results ====
Team ╲ Game	1	2	3	4	5	6
Arellano	JRU school colors	CSB school colors	San Beda school colors	Lyceum school colors	EAC school colors	UPHD school colors
EAC–ICA	San Beda school colors	JRU school colors	UPHD school colors	Arellano school colors	CSB school colors	Lyceum school colors
JRU	Arellano school colors	EAC school colors	CSB school colors	UPHD school colors	Lyceum school colors	San Beda school colors
LSGH	UPHD school colors	Arellano school colors	JRU school colors	San Beda school colors	Lyceum school colors	EAC school colors
Lyceum–Cavite	CSB school colors	Arellano school colors	San Beda school colors	JRU school colors	UPHD school colors	EAC school colors
San Beda–Rizal	EAC school colors	UPHD school colors	Arellano school colors	Lyceum school colors	CSB school colors	JRU school colors
Perpetual	CSB school colors	San Beda school colors	EAC school colors	JRU school colors	Lyceum school colors	Arellano school colors

Source: GMA Integrated News
= Win; = Loss

==== Scores ====
Teams	AU	EAC–ICA	JRU	LSGH	LPU–C	SBU–R	UPHSD
Arellano Lady Braves		2–0	2–0	2–0	2–0	2–0	0–2
EAC–ICA Lady Brigadiers			2–0	2–0	2–1	2–0	1–2
JRU Light Lady Bombers				0–2	0–2	0–2	0–2
La Salle Lady Greenies					0–2	1–2	0–2
Lyceum Junior Lady Pirates						2–0	1–2
San Beda Baby Red Spikers							0–2
Perpetual Junior Lady Altas							

Source: GMA Integrated News
Legend: Blue = left column team win; Red = top row team win.

=== Bracket ===
Semifinals (Top 2 twice-to-beat)
1	Perpetual	3
4	Lyceum–Cavite	0
2	Arellano	3
3	EAC–ICA	0

Finals (Best-of-three series)
1	Perpetual	3	3
2	Arellano	0	0
Third place playoff
4	Lyceum–Cavite	2
3	EAC–ICA	3

- Finals MVP: Elizha Sildo (Perpetual Junior Lady Altas)
- Coach of the Year: Sandy Rieta (Perpetual Junior Lady Altas)

=== Awards ===
NCAA Season 101 girls' volleyball champions
Perpetual Junior Lady Altas
Second title

- Most Valuable Player:
- Rookie of the Year:
- Freshman of the Year:
- 1st best outside spiker:
  - 2nd best outside spiker:
- 1st best middle blocker: Isay Culanay (San Beda Baby Red Spikers)
  - 2nd best middle blocker:
- Best opposite spiker:
- Best setter:
- Best Libero:

== See also ==
- UAAP Season 88 volleyball tournaments

Preceded by Season 100 (2025)	NCAA volleyball tournaments Season 101 (2026)	Succeeded by Season 102 (2027)
