= NCAA Season 100 volleyball tournaments =

Volleyball tournament

NCAA Season 100
- Siglo Uno: Inspiring Legacies
- Host school: Arellano University (Collegiate and High school)
Men's Finals	G1	G2	Wins
Arellano Chiefs	3	3	2
Letran Knights	1	1	0
- Duration: June 8–11, 2025
- Arena(s): Playtime Filoil Centre
- Finals MVP: Carl Justin Berdal
- Winning coach: Bryan Vitug
- Semifinalists: Benilde Blazers (bronze); Mapúa Cardinals
- TV network(s): GTV Heart of Asia
Women's Finals	G1	G2	Wins
Benilde Lady Blazers	3	3	2
Letran Lady Knights	1	0	0
- Duration: June 8–11, 2025
- Arena(s): Playtime Filoil Centre
- Finals MVP: Francis Mycah Go
- Winning coach: Rogelio Getigan
- Semifinalists: Arellano Lady Chiefs (bronze); Mapúa Lady Cardinals
- TV network(s): GTV Heart of Asia
Boys' Finals	G1	G2	G3	Wins
Perpetual Junior Altas	3	1	3	2
Letran Squires	0	3	2	1
- Duration: May 30 – June 8, 2025
- Arena(s): Playtime Filoil Centre
- Finals MVP: John Weihanan Lat
- Winning coach: Sandy Rieta
- Semifinalists: Malayan Junior Spikers; Arellano Braves (bronze)
Girls' Finals	G1	G2	Wins
Perpetual Junior Lady Altas	1	2	0
Arellano Lady Braves	3	3	2
- Duration: May 30 – June 1, 2025
- Arena(s): Playtime Filoil Centre
- Finals MVP: Samantha Hillary Maranan
- Winning coach: Roberto Javier
- Semifinalists: EAC–ICA Lady Brigadiers (bronze); Lyceum Junior Lady Pirates

The NCAA Season 100 volleyball tournaments were the volleyball tournaments of the National Collegiate Athletic Association (Philippines) for its 2024–25 season.

The seniors tournament started on February 20, 2025 and concluded on June 11, 2025.

== Teams ==
Seniors' division
University	Men		Women	
University	Team	Coach	Team	Coach
Arellano University (AU)	Arellano Chiefs	Carl Bryan Vitug	Arellano Lady Chiefs	Roberto Javier
Colegio de San Juan de Letran (CSJL)	Letran Knights	Brian Esquibel	Letran Lady Knights	Oliver Almadro
De La Salle–College of Saint Benilde (CSB)	Benilde Blazers	Arnold Laniog	Benilde Lady Blazers	Rogelio Getigan/Jerry Yee
Emilio Aguinaldo College (EAC)	EAC Generals	Rodrigo Palmero	EAC Lady Generals	Rodrigo Palmero
José Rizal University (JRU)	JRU Heavy Bombers	Larry Sioco Jr.	JRU Lady Bombers	Mia Tioseco
Lyceum of the Philippines University (LPU)	Lyceum Pirates	Paul Jan Dolorias	Lyceum Lady Pirates	Cromwel Garcia
Mapúa University (MU)	Mapúa Cardinals	Clarence Esteban	Mapúa Lady Cardinals	Clarence Esteban
San Beda University (SBU)	San Beda Red Spikers	Ariel Dela Cruz	San Beda Lady Red Spikers	Edgar Barroga then Joshua Noda
San Sebastian College – Recoletos (SSC–R)	San Sebastian Stags	Boyet Delmoro	San Sebastian Lady Stags	Clint Malazo/Roger Gorayeb
University of Perpetual Help System DALTA (UPHSD)	Perpetual Altas	Michael Cariño	Perpetual Lady Altas	Sandy Rieta

Juniors' division
High school	Boys' team	Girls' team
Arellano University High School (AU)	Arellano Braves	Arellano Lady Braves
Colegio de San Juan de Letran (CSJL)	Letran Squires	—N/a
Immaculate Conception Academy (ICA)	EAC-ICA Brigadiers	EAC-ICA Lady Brigadiers
José Rizal University (JRU)	JRU Light Bombers	JRU Light Lady Bombers
La Salle Green Hills (LSGH)	La Salle Green Hills Greenies	La Salle Lady Greenies
Lyceum of the Philippines University – Cavite (LPU–C)	Lyceum Junior Pirates	Lyceum Junior Lady Pirates
Malayan High School of Science (MHSS)	Malayan Junior Spikers	—N/a
San Beda University – Rizal (SBU–R)	San Beda Junior Red Spikers	—N/a
San Sebastian College – Recoletos (SSC–R)	San Sebastian Staglets	—N/a
University of Perpetual Help System DALTA (UPHSD)	Perpetual Junior Altas	Perpetual Junior Lady Altas

== Men's tournament ==
=== Team line-up ===
Arellano Chiefs
No.	Name	Position
1	SINUTO, John Will	MB
2	GUINTO, Arman Clarence	OP
3	AGOVIDA, Daniel Adonai	OH
4	PANGILINAN, Jake	MB
5	BERDAL, Carl Justin	OH
6	VILLADOS, Adrian (c)	S
7	CURAMEN, Anfernee	MB
9	SALVO, Laurence Andrei	OP
11	DATU, Joshua	L
12	SINUTO, Jiwen	S
13	CATERIA, Wainn Wojtyla	OP
18	BUSTILLO, Melchor III	L
20	DOMINGUITO, CJ	OH
21	TEVES, Jake Henry	OP
	Carl Bryan Vitug	HC

Letran Knights
No.	Name	Position
1	HIMZON, Vince Virrey	MB
2	VICENTE, Raphael Lorenz	OH
3	DE GUZMAN, Mark Raniel	OP
4	ARANO, John Wayne (c)	S
5	CORDERO, Luke Benjamin	L
6	BERMIDO, Felix Rodrigo	OH
8	SUMAGAYSAY, John Romer	MB
10	JUMAPIT, Jeffrey	OH
12	BAUTISTA, John Derrick	OP
13	ABELLADA, Beneth Jan	L
14	CABALLERO, Namron Ellehcar	OH
15	LARDIZABAL, Dave Thomas	S
16	AMBROCIO, Christer Lou	OP
17	ABETO, Andrew	OH
18	BARBA, Arieh	OH
21	DOMALANTA, Dennis	MB
	Brian Esquibel	HC

Benilde Blazers
No.	Name	Position
1	FAJARDO, Jericho Paulo	S
2	JORDAN, Paul Amadeo	MB
3	ONDEVILLA, Kevin Jonathan	OP
4	MARASIGAN, James Harold	OH
5	VILLANUEVA, Chris Lorenz	S
9	MOTOL, Rocky Roy	OH
10	HERRERA, Jacob Agassi	MB
12	BALBACAL, Mike Adrian	MB
13	MACAGALING, Marc Lawrence	S
14	GRANIADA, Dexter	OP
15	AGUILAR, Arnel Christian (c)	OH
17	CUENCA, Jeremi Pierre	L
18	AUSTERO, John Adriane	OH
19	RABANES, Al Bernard	OP
21	BALDADO, Martin Daniel	OP
22	BETCO, Raymark	MB
	Arnold Laniog	HC

EAC Generals
No.	Name	Position
1	OLIVO, Joshua	OH
2	SAY, Paul Justine	OP
3	ROSAGARAN, Edward Karlson	S
5	MAGPANTAY, Jan Francis	L
6	TAMAYO, Ralph Christian	MB
7	SANTIAGO, Basty	MB
8	TACULOG, Frelwin	OH
9	PALATINO, Mark	OP
10	SANTOS, Mark Joseph	L
11	GURA, Paul Edward	MB
12	SARIA, Dearborn	S
14	ABOR, Jan Ruther	OH
15	BATIANCILA, Kenneth (c)	MB
16	GELA, Michael	OP
17	SABELLA, Randy	OH
	Rodrigo Palmero	HC

JRU Heavy Bombers
No.	Name	Position
1	CALUMPANG, Jonathan	OP
2	BARRIENTOS, Paolo	OP
4	SUAL, Dhen Henry	L
5	ALIPAN, Bryle (c)	MB
7	DATIG, Ivan	OH
8	GUANZON, Maki	S
9	MALLILLIN, Mathew	OP
10	UNDING, Al-jecradin	MB
11	DELA CRUZ, Charlie Jade	OH
12	FERNANDEZ, Jake Johnson	OP
15	OCAY, Harry Jim	MB
16	DAIS, Klause Alice	S
18	CARBON, Aristotle	L
19	ZAPICO, Neil Yvonne	OH
25	DE LEMIOS, Prince	MB
	Larry Sioco Jr.	HC

Lyceum Pirates
No.	Name	Position
1	EDANG, Gian Carlo	OP
2	AQUINO, Jhon Icon	OH
3	TALENTO, David Quer	S
4	LANORIO, Mark Kenneth	MB
5	INTING, Phil Nikirich	L
7	EDANG, John Frank	OP
8	BLANCO, Ace Van Robnoel	OH
9	SANTOS, Isiah Chrys	MB
10	DE GUZMAN, Rogel	OP
11	MORAL, Kian Carlo (c)	L
15	CIELO, John Bert	OH
16	MARTINEZ, Khen Warren	S
17	SANTOS, Jerzy	MB
19	DUMASIG, Chris John Louie	OH
	Paul Jan Dolorias	HC

Mapúa Cardinals
No.	Name	Position
1	QUEMADA, Zyldjan Ace	L
2	JAMISOLA, Saint Marlowe	OP
3	VALENZUELA, Jayvee	MB
5	MUSNGI, Adrian Patrick	OH
6	TOPACIO, Kalvyn Aldrake	OP
7	RAMOS, Ar-jay	MB
8	BARBA, Juancho Joaquin	S
10	JAVIER, Louis Cedric	OH
11	YAP, Joseph Evan	OP
12	CABALLERO, Marc Joshua	L
13	SAN ANDRES, John Benedict (c)	OH
14	GRIPO, Ramil	S
18	MACADANGDANG, Alvin	MB
21	GALICIA, John Cris	OH
	Clarence Esteban	HC

San Beda Red Spikers
No.	Name	Position
1	MILJANI, Alsenal	S
5	BAKIL, Anrie	OH
6	BOOK, Axel Van	OH
7	MUNSING, Alener Greg	MB
8	DELA CRUZ, Eddie Jong	OP
9	ACOSTA, Joseph Joezel II	OH
11	KASIM, Eduwin	MB
12	CASTAÑEDA, Dominic	S
13	MONTEMAYOR, Mark Kevin	OP
14	IGNACIO, Rainier John	MB
17	SAMUEL, Jainul	OP
18	ROSMAN, Ryan	OH
23	RUS, Aidjien Josh (c)	L
24	GALLANO, Gian Lorenz	L
	Ariel Dela Cruz	HC

San Sebastian Stags
No.	Name	Position
1	BINONDO, Aaron Einstein	OH
2	VILLAMOR, Kyle Angelo (c)	OP
3	CUADRA, Shawnieder	L
4	ARANO, John Kerk	S
5	SARISARI, John Eric Frias	MB
6	DUGUEN, Jilbert	OH
9	LEAL, Lorenzo Miguel	L
10	MARCOS, Jezreel Franz	OP
11	ESPENIDA, Joshua	S
12	ALBA, Rhenmart Christian	OH
13	GALINDO, Sarif	MB
15	SUGA, Reniel	OP
16	SANTOS, Justine	OH
18	LIM, Cedric Resty	MB
	Boyet Delmoro	HC

Perpetual Altas
No.	Name	Position
1	LITUANA, John Exequiel	MB
2	MARAPOC, Jefferson (c)	OP
3	PASCUA, James Niño	OH
4	TABUGA, Kobe Brian	MB
6	ANDRADE, KC	S
8	ROSETE, Stefano Mauro	OH
9	ENGAY, Renz Angelo	OP
10	JESTRE, Karl Justine	L
11	MATEO, Klint Michael	S
15	ARROZADO, Dexter	OH
16	ROSOS, Kirth Patrick	MB
17	CASTIL, John	OP
18	GALILA, Christian Annrhey	L
19	MANALOTO, Hezron Rai	OH
	Michael Cariño	HC

=== Elimination round ===
==== Team standings ====
Pos	Team	Pld	W	L	Pts	SW	SL	SR	SPW	SPL	SPR	Qualification
1	Benilde Blazers	18	14	4	40	47	22	2.136	1639	1509	1.086	Twice-to-beat in the semifinals
2	Mapúa Cardinals	18	14	4	36	44	30	1.467	1673	1583	1.057	Twice-to-beat in the semifinals
3	Arellano Chiefs (H)	18	13	5	38	45	23	1.957	1610	1413	1.139	Twice-to-win in the semifinals
4	Letran Knights	18	12	6	38	45	26	1.731	1719	1484	1.158	Twice-to-win in the semifinals
5	San Beda Red Spikers	18	10	8	31	38	32	1.188	1609	1499	1.073	
6	Perpetual Altas	18	10	8	28	39	34	1.147	1593	1593	1.000	
7	San Sebastian Stags	18	6	12	19	26	41	0.634	1432	1513	0.946	
8	EAC Generals	18	5	13	19	27	42	0.643	1399	1482	0.944	
9	JRU Heavy Bombers	18	3	15	11	16	46	0.348	1267	1484	0.854	
10	Lyceum Pirates	18	3	15	10	20	51	0.392	1496	1733	0.863	

Source: GMA Integrated News
Rules for classification: 1) Number of wins; 2) match points; 3) sets ratio; 4) points ratio; 5) head-to-head record
(H) Host

==== Match-up results ====
	Round 1									Round 2								
Team ╲ Game	1	2	3	4	5	6	7	8	9	10	11	12	13	14	15	16	17	18
Arellano	CSB school colors	Lyceum school colors	San Beda school colors	UPHD school colors	Mapua school colors	Letran school colors	JRU school colors	SSC-R school colors	EAC school colors	SSC-R school colors	Mapua school colors	San Beda school colors	JRU school colors	CSB school colors	Letran school colors	UPHD school colors	EAC school colors	Lyceum school colors
Letran	JRU school colors	Mapua school colors	CSB school colors	Lyceum school colors	EAC school colors	Arellano school colors	San Beda school colors	UPHD school colors	SSC-R school colors	San Beda school colors	UPHD school colors	EAC school colors	Lyceum school colors	SSC-R school colors	Arellano school colors	CSB school colors	JRU school colors	Mapua school colors
Benilde	Arellano school colors	JRU school colors	SSC-R school colors	Letran school colors	San Beda school colors	Lyceum school colors	EAC school colors	UPHD school colors	Mapua school colors	JRU school colors	EAC school colors	SSC-R school colors	Arellano school colors	San Beda school colors	Letran school colors	Mapua school colors	UPHD school colors	Lyceum school colors
EAC	Lyceum school colors	SSC-R school colors	San Beda school colors	Mapua school colors	UPHD school colors	Letran school colors	CSB school colors	JRU school colors	Arellano school colors	Mapua school colors	CSB school colors	Letran school colors	UPHD school colors	JRU school colors	Lyceum school colors	Arellano school colors	San Beda school colors	SSC-R school colors
JRU	Letran school colors	UPHD school colors	CSB school colors	San Beda school colors	SSC-R school colors	Mapua school colors	Arellano school colors	EAC school colors	Lyceum school colors	CSB school colors	Lyceum school colors	SSC-R school colors	Arellano school colors	EAC school colors	Mapua school colors	San Beda school colors	UPHD school colors	Letran school colors
Lyceum	EAC school colors	Arellano school colors	UPHD school colors	Mapua school colors	Letran school colors	CSB school colors	SSC-R school colors	San Beda school colors	JRU school colors	UPHD school colors	JRU school colors	Mapua school colors	Letran school colors	San Beda school colors	EAC school colors	SSC-R school colors	Arellano school colors	CSB school colors
Mapúa	SSC-R school colors	Letran school colors	Lyceum school colors	EAC school colors	Arellano school colors	JRU school colors	San Beda school colors	CSB school colors	UPHD school colors	EAC school colors	Arellano school colors	Lyceum school colors	UPHD school colors	San Beda school colors	JRU school colors	SSC-R school colors	CSB school colors	Letran school colors
San Beda	UPHD school colors	Arellano school colors	JRU school colors	EAC school colors	CSB school colors	SSC-R school colors	Letran school colors	Mapua school colors	Lyceum school colors	Letran school colors	SSC-R school colors	Arellano school colors	Mapua school colors	Lyceum school colors	CSB school colors	JRU school colors	EAC school colors	UPHD school colors
San Sebastian	Mapua school colors	EAC school colors	CSB school colors	JRU school colors	UPHD school colors	San Beda school colors	Lyceum school colors	Arellano school colors	Letran school colors	Arellano school colors	San Beda school colors	JRU school colors	CSB school colors	Letran school colors	UPHD school colors	Mapua school colors	Lyceum school colors	EAC school colors
Perpetual	San Beda school colors	JRU school colors	Lyceum school colors	Arellano school colors	EAC school colors	SSC-R school colors	CSB school colors	Letran school colors	Mapua school colors	Lyceum school colors	Letran school colors	Mapua school colors	EAC school colors	SSC-R school colors	Arellano school colors	JRU school colors	CSB school colors	San Beda school colors

Source: GMA Integrated News
= Win; = Loss

==== Scores ====
Teams	AU	CSJL	CSB	EAC	JRU	LPU	MU	SBU	SSC–R	UPHSD
Arellano Chiefs		3–1	1–3	3–1	3–0	3–0	1–3	1–3	3–0	3–2
Letran Knights	1–3		1–3	3–1	3–0	3–0	2–3	3–1	3–0	3–1
Benilde Blazers	3–1	1–3		3–2	3–0	3–0	1–3	3–2	3–0	3–0
EAC Generals	0–3	1–3	2–3		3–0	3–1	2–3	0–3	3–1	2–3
JRU Heavy Bombers	0–3	0–3	3–1	3–0		2–3	1–3	1–3	0–3	0–3
Lyceum Pirates	2–3	1–3	3–2	0–3	0–3		2–3	1–3	3–2	2–3
Mapúa Cardinals	1–3	0–3	0–3	3–1	3–1	3–0		3–2	3–1	3–2
San Beda Red Spikers	0–3	3–2	0–3	3–0	3–0	3–0	3–1		3–2	0–3
San Sebastian Stags	3–2	2–3	0–3	3–0	3–0	3–2	0–3	3–1		0–3
Perpetual Altas	0–3	3–2	1–3	1–3	3–2	3–0	2–3	3–2	3–0	

Source: GMA Integrated News
Legend: Blue = left column team win; Red = top row team win.

=== Bracket ===
Semifinals (Nos. 1 & 2 have twice-to-beat advantage)
1	Benilde	0	1
4	Letran	3	3
2	Mapúa	1	0
3	Arellano	3	3

Finals (Best-of-three series)
4	Letran	1	1
3	Arellano	3	3
Third place playoff
1	Benilde	3
2	Mapúa	1

=== Semifinals ===
The top two seeds in the semifinals have the twice-to-beat advantage.

==== (1) Benilde vs. (4) Letran ====
Benilde has the twice-to-beat advantage.

June 1, 2025; 12:00pm	Benilde Blazers	0–3	Letran Knights	Playtime Filoil Centre, San Juan
June 1, 2025; 12:00pm	(17–25 23–25 23–25)			Playtime Filoil Centre, San Juan

June 6, 2025; 12:00pm	Benilde Blazers	1–3	Letran Knights	Playtime Filoil Centre, San Juan
June 6, 2025; 12:00pm	(25–22 26–28 14–25 20– 25)			Playtime Filoil Centre, San Juan
June 6, 2025; 12:00pm	Letran wins series in two games			Playtime Filoil Centre, San Juan

==== (2) Mapua vs. (3) Arellano ====
Mapua has the twice-to-beat advantage.

June 3, 2025; 11:00am	Mapúa Cardinals	1–3	Arellano Chiefs	Playtime Filoil Centre, San Juan
June 3, 2025; 11:00am	(25–21 23–25 17–25 13–25)			Playtime Filoil Centre, San Juan

June 6, 2025; 02:30pm	Mapúa Cardinals	0–3	Arellano Chiefs	Playtime Filoil Centre, San Juan
June 6, 2025; 02:30pm	(20–25 15–25 15–25)			Playtime Filoil Centre, San Juan
June 6, 2025; 02:30pm	Arellano wins series in two games			Playtime Filoil Centre, San Juan

=== Third place playoff ===
The third place playoff is between semifinal losers.

June 11, 2025	Benilde Blazers	3–1	Mapúa Cardinals	Playtime Filoil Centre, San Juan
June 11, 2025	(24–26 25–8 25–20 25–23)			Playtime Filoil Centre, San Juan

=== Finals ===
The finals is a best-of-three playoff.

June 8, 2025; 12:00pm	Arellano Chiefs	3–1	Letran Knights	Playtime Filoil Centre, San Juan; Attendance: 1,000+
June 8, 2025; 12:00pm	(27–25 25–14 22–25 25–22)			Playtime Filoil Centre, San Juan; Attendance: 1,000+

June 11, 2025; 11:00am	Arellano Chiefs	3–1	Letran Knights	Playtime Filoil Centre, San Juan; Attendance: 2,000+
June 11, 2025; 11:00am	(24–26 25–21 25–15 25–17)			Playtime Filoil Centre, San Juan; Attendance: 2,000+
June 11, 2025; 11:00am	Arellano wins Finals, 2–0			Playtime Filoil Centre, San Juan; Attendance: 2,000+

- Finals MVP: Carl Justin Berdal (Arellano Chiefs)
- Coach of the Year: Bryan Vitug (Arellano Chiefs)

=== Awards ===
NCAA Season 100 men's volleyball champions
Arellano Chiefs
First title

- Most Valuable Player: Rocky Roy Motol (Benilde Blazers)
- Rookie of the Year: Rocky Roy Motol (Benilde Blazers)
- Freshman of the Year: Dave Thomas Lardizabal (Letran Knights)
- 1st best outside spiker: Rocky Roy Motol (Benilde Blazers)
  - 2nd best outside spiker: Barbie San Andres (Mapúa Cardinals)
- 1st best middle blocker: Vince Virrey Himzon (Letran Knights)
  - 2nd best middle blocker: John Adriane Austero (Benilde Blazers)
- Best opposite spiker: Kobe Brian Tabuga (Perpetual Altas)
- Best setter: John Wayne Araño (Letran Knights)
- Best Libero: Aidien Josh Rus (San Beda Red Lions)

==== Players of the Week ====
The Collegiate Press Corps awards a "player of the week" on Mondays for performances on the preceding week.

Week	Player	Team	Ref.
Week 1	Jefferson Marapoc	Perpetual Altas	
Week 2	Carl Justin Berdal	Arellano Chiefs	
Week 3	Arjay Ramos	Mapúa Cardinals	
Week 4	Jan Will Sinuto	Arellano Chiefs	
Week 5	Rocky Roy Motol	Benilde Blazers	
Week 6	Barbie San Andres	Mapúa Cardinals	
Week 7	Kyle Villamor	San Sebastian Stags	
Week 8	Adrian Villados	Arellano Chiefs	
Week 9	AC Guinto	Arellano Chiefs	
Week 10	Vince Himzon	Letran Knights	

== Women's tournament ==
=== Team line-up ===
Arellano Lady Chiefs
No.	Name	Position
1	ADANTE, Kristine	S
2	TIRATIRA, Samantha Gabrielle	MB
3	PADUA, Ma. Nenita	OH
4	VILLAFLORES, Heart	OH
5	ARELLANO, Kyra	MB
6	PABLO, Khey Aleck	L
7	TUDLASAN, Laika	OH
8	CAGUICLA, Alona Nicole (c)	L
9	MAGALING, Mauie Joice	OP
10	PADILLON, Marianne Lei Angelique	OH
11	PALALON, Jazmine	OH
12	CEBALLOS, Harem	OH
13	MANGUBAT, Fhaye	MB
14	DE GUZMAN, Pauline	OP
15	DOMASIG, Catherine	S
16	PUNZALAN, Kacelyn	MB
	Roberto Javier	HC

Letran Lady Knights
No.	Name	Position
1	NITURA, Marie Judiel	OP
3	DELA CRUZ, Royce	MB
4	NAPAL, Marjorie	MB
7	MARTIN, Nizelle Aeriyen	OH
8	TUMAYAO, Princes Zyne	S
9	PANANGIN, Joralyn	OH
10	ESTRELLER, Natalie Marie	S
12	COLENDRA, Verenicce	OP
14	ENVERGA, Marbey Allen	L
15	SARIE, Sheena Vanessa	OH
16	ISAR, Lastille Jade	MB
17	FLORES, Hizki	S
18	BRAGO, Edcynth Pearl	OH
19	SILVA, Lara Mae (c)	L
25	MAQUILANG, Gia Marcel	OH
	Oliver Almadro	HC

Benilde Lady Blazers
No.	Name	Position
1	BASARTE, Chenae	S
2	LLESES, Shekaina Rhedge	OH
3	LLESES, Shahanna Rheign	OH
4	ESTENZO, Kim Alison	L
5	GETIGAN, Fiona	L
6	BASILIO, Zen Reina	MB
9	DENSING, Rhea Mae	OP
10	GO, Francis Mycah (c)	OH
11	BADION, Sophia Margarette	MB
14	ESTOQUE, Wielyn	OH
15	INOCENTES, Fionna Marie	MB
16	CATARIG, Clydel Mae	OP
17	DOROG, Jessa	OH
18	ONDANGAN, Cristy	MB
19	BORROMEO, Mary Grace	OH
21	NOLASCO, Zamantha	MB
	Jerry Yee	HC

EAC Lady Generals
No.	Name	Position
1	DAYANAN, Cara Xia Xyra	OH
2	OMAPAS, Jennifer	OP
3	LUT, Georgeena	S
4	DE ANDRES, Karyle Rae	L
5	LEPITEN, Achelis AJ	MB
6	BODONAL, Erica Maye	OH
7	VILLENA, Jamaica	MB
8	GARCIA, Gekeshzra	L
10	RAMOS, Marinel	MB
11	MAGNAYI, Ashley Nicole Jeremy	OP
12	FORMENTO, Anne Jelyn (c)	S
14	DOMO, Florence Jane	OH
16	MAGALONA, Rhea	MB
18	RAZONABLE, Alessandra Julienne	OH
19	ALIMEN, Elizza Mae	OH
20	BALASAN, Jasmine Therese	MB
	Rodrigo Palmero	HC

JRU Lady Bombers
No.	Name	Position
1	LAURENTE, Jerry Lyn	S
2	AMANTE, Mailey	MB
3	JASARENO, Karyla Rafaela (c)	OH
4	MARTINEZ, Lei Greyce	MB
5	ALONA, Marianne	L
6	ROSTRO, Trixie	OP
7	SILVERIO, Genelyn	MB
8	DEALA, Nicole Grace	OP
9	PRETTA, Shanine	OH
10	RAMOS, Czarina	OH
11	DAYAME, Cherish	OH
12	YONGCO, Angelica Mae	OH
14	DETABLAN, Alyanna Kaye	S
15	CANOY, Juliana Marie	MB
16	BATARA, Khreiszantha Gayle	MB
17	DEL PILAR, Patricia Ann	MB
	Mia Tioseco	HC

Lyceum Lady Pirates
No.	Name	Position
1	PEREZ, Ana Mae	OP
2	GUZMAN, Angelica Blue	L
3	MARTIN, Vanessa Yvonne	MB
4	DE GUZMAN, Joann Faeith	OH
5	LOPEZ, Ma. Light Jericha	L
6	TULANG, Janeth	OP
7	RIVAS, Marcela Angela	L
8	LOPEZ, Stacey Denise	OP
10	PUZON, Venice (c)	S
11	GALEDO, Katrina Paula	S
12	DOGUNA, Joan	OH
14	CRUZ, Angelica	MB
15	DOLORITO, Johna Denise	OH
16	OSADA, Hiromi	MB
19	BIO, Heart	MB
20	MUCHILLAS, Ashley	OP
	Cromwel Garcia	HC

Mapúa Lady Cardinals
No.	Name	Position
1	CABADIN, Gregchelle Grace	OP
2	RICABLANCA, Raissa Janel	OH
3	MANALO, Therese Angeli (c)	MB
4	GARCIA, Freighanne Seanelle	OH
5	MARCOS, Clarence	MB
6	REBUSTES, Princess	L
7	GAVICA, Angelick Gem	S
9	YABUT, Diandrah	MB
10	MANARANG, Princess Jeline	S
11	ONG, Alyana Nicole	MB
12	TAMBASACAN, Ma. Theresa	S
14	ESTEBAN, Franchesca Clariss	OP
16	BERCES, Nadine Angeli	OH
18	DE GUZMAN, Hannah	OP
19	GACULA, Freebie Alejandra	OP
20	BASBAS, Vanessa	L
	Clarence Esteban	HC

San Beda Lady Red Spikers
No.	Name	Position
1	HABACON, Angel	OH
3	ESPINA, Gina	S
4	BIONG, Amber Lily	L
5	CASTILLO, Chynna Allyson	OH
6	CAÑETE, Reyann (c)	OP
8	MOLINA, Katleya Jewel	S
9	BACHAR, Janelle	OP
10	CAGALAWAN, Michela Sophia	OH
11	DELA CRUZ, Sophia Katrina	OH
12	DELA CRUZ, Jayde Margaret	OH
13	CAMPOS, Angel Joy	L
15	HIPONIA, Patricia Grace	S
16	NAVARRO, Erin Feliz	MB
17	BEDURAL, Rianne Margaret	MB
18	BANÑAS, Gwen	L
20	DAYRIT, Claire Dannielle	MB
	Edgar Barroga	HC

San Sebastian Lady Stags
No.	Name	Position
1	SANTOS, Katherine (c)	OH
2	DIONISIO, Kristine Joy	MB
3	RAMOS, Princess Sofia	MB
4	MARASIGAN, Christina	OH
5	GARCIA, Divine Roshielle	OH
6	LOMIBAO, Jassy Lei	MB
7	RUIZ, Sofiah Leigh	MB
8	BALAJADIA, Jercine Mae	S
9	LAZARTE, Chloi Florenci	L
10	ABRAHAM, Kleiner Ross	OP
11	DEPOSOY, Zenith Joy	OH
12	GONZALES, Juna May	OP
13	DIMACULANGAN, Von Aleina	S
14	BACOLOD, Jaimee Rose	L
	Roger Gorayeb	HC

Perpetual Lady Altas
No.	Name	Position
1	LOZANO, Joanna Denise	L
2	ENRICO, Charisse Mae	MB
3	BEDAÑA, Winnie	MB
4	OMIPON, Shaila Allaine	OH
5	REYES, Pauline Mae	OP
6	ARIOLA, Fianne Istle	S
8	DONIG, Jilliaza Mika	OH
9	PALACIO, Geraldine Rae	MB
10	MARIANO, Monica Louise	OP
11	BUSTAMANTE, Camille	OP
12	ANDAL, Marian Tracy (c)	L
14	UY, Daizerlyn Joyce	MB
15	MENOR, Jemalyn	OH
18	GAA, Nicollete Anne	S
19	LAGMAY, Jazhryll Loraine	MB
20	VILLANUEVA, Ma. Gracela Amina	MB
	Sandy Rieta	HC

=== Elimination round ===
The Letran Lady Knights ended the CSB Lady Blazers' 43-game winning streak, which had started in NCAA Season 95 (2019), on March 8, 2025.

==== Team standings ====
Pos	Team	Pld	W	L	Pts	SW	SL	SR	SPW	SPL	SPR	Qualification
1	Benilde Lady Blazers	18	16	2	47	49	11	4.455	1326	1005	1.319	Twice-to-beat in the semifinals
2	Letran Lady Knights	18	15	3	45	49	18	2.722	1550	1375	1.127	Twice-to-beat in the semifinals
3	Arellano Lady Chiefs (H)	18	12	6	33	42	29	1.448	1519	1389	1.094	Twice-to-win in the semifinals
4	Mapúa Lady Cardinals	18	11	7	33	40	29	1.379	1416	1413	1.002	Twice-to-win in the semifinals
5	Perpetual Lady Altas	18	9	9	29	35	34	1.029	1432	1429	1.002	
6	Lyceum Lady Pirates	18	8	10	23	30	40	0.750	1405	1429	0.983	
7	San Sebastian Lady Stags	18	8	10	22	29	37	0.784	1379	1352	1.020	
8	San Beda Lady Red Spikers	18	4	14	13	23	46	0.500	1309	1420	0.922	
9	EAC Lady Generals	18	4	14	12	19	47	0.404	1218	1437	0.848	
10	JRU Lady Bombers	18	3	15	13	22	47	0.468	1204	1428	0.843	

Source: GMA Integrated News
Rules for classification: 1) Number of wins; 2) match points; 3) sets ratio; 4) points ratio; 5) head-to-head record
(H) Host

==== Match-up results ====
	Round 1									Round 2								
Team ╲ Game	1	2	3	4	5	6	7	8	9	10	11	12	13	14	15	16	17	18
Arellano	CSB school colors	Lyceum school colors	San Beda school colors	UPHD school colors	Mapua school colors	Letran school colors	JRU school colors	SSC-R school colors	EAC school colors	SSC-R school colors	Mapua school colors	San Beda school colors	JRU school colors	CSB school colors	Letran school colors	UPHD school colors	EAC school colors	Lyceum school colors
Letran	JRU school colors	Mapua school colors	CSB school colors	Lyceum school colors	EAC school colors	Arellano school colors	San Beda school colors	UPHD school colors	SSC-R school colors	San Beda school colors	UPHD school colors	EAC school colors	Lyceum school colors	SSC-R school colors	Arellano school colors	CSB school colors	JRU school colors	Mapua school colors
Benilde	Arellano school colors	JRU school colors	SSC-R school colors	Letran school colors	San Beda school colors	Lyceum school colors	EAC school colors	UPHD school colors	Mapua school colors	JRU school colors	EAC school colors	SSC-R school colors	Arellano school colors	San Beda school colors	Letran school colors	Mapua school colors	UPHD school colors	Lyceum school colors
EAC	Lyceum school colors	SSC-R school colors	San Beda school colors	Mapua school colors	UPHD school colors	Letran school colors	CSB school colors	JRU school colors	Arellano school colors	Mapua school colors	CSB school colors	Letran school colors	UPHD school colors	JRU school colors	Lyceum school colors	Arellano school colors	San Beda school colors	SSC-R school colors
JRU	Letran school colors	UPHD school colors	CSB school colors	San Beda school colors	SSC-R school colors	Mapua school colors	Arellano school colors	EAC school colors	Lyceum school colors	CSB school colors	Lyceum school colors	SSC-R school colors	Arellano school colors	EAC school colors	Mapua school colors	San Beda school colors	UPHD school colors	Letran school colors
Lyceum	EAC school colors	Arellano school colors	UPHD school colors	Mapua school colors	Letran school colors	CSB school colors	SSC-R school colors	San Beda school colors	JRU school colors	UPHD school colors	JRU school colors	Mapua school colors	Letran school colors	San Beda school colors	EAC school colors	SSC-R school colors	Arellano school colors	CSB school colors
Mapúa	SSC-R school colors	Letran school colors	Lyceum school colors	EAC school colors	Arellano school colors	JRU school colors	San Beda school colors	CSB school colors	UPHD school colors	EAC school colors	Arellano school colors	Lyceum school colors	UPHD school colors	San Beda school colors	JRU school colors	SSC-R school colors	CSB school colors	Letran school colors
San Beda	UPHD school colors	Arellano school colors	JRU school colors	EAC school colors	CSB school colors	SSC-R school colors	Letran school colors	Mapua school colors	Lyceum school colors	Letran school colors	SSC-R school colors	Arellano school colors	Mapua school colors	Lyceum school colors	CSB school colors	JRU school colors	EAC school colors	UPHD school colors
San Sebastian	Mapua school colors	EAC school colors	CSB school colors	JRU school colors	UPHD school colors	San Beda school colors	Lyceum school colors	Arellano school colors	Letran school colors	Arellano school colors	San Beda school colors	JRU school colors	CSB school colors	Letran school colors	UPHD school colors	Mapua school colors	Lyceum school colors	EAC school colors
Perpetual	San Beda school colors	JRU school colors	Lyceum school colors	Arellano school colors	EAC school colors	SSC-R school colors	CSB school colors	Letran school colors	Mapua school colors	Lyceum school colors	Letran school colors	Mapua school colors	EAC school colors	SSC-R school colors	Arellano school colors	JRU school colors	CSB school colors	San Beda school colors

Source: GMA Integrated News
= Win; = Loss

==== Scores ====
Teams	AU	CSJL	CSB	EAC	JRU	LPU	MU	SBU	SSC–R	UPHSD
Arellano Lady Chiefs		3–1	1–3	3–0	3–2	3–0	1–3	3–1	3–0	1–3
Letran Lady Knights	3–2		3–0	3–1	3–1	3–0	3–1	3–1	3–1	2–3
Benilde Lady Blazers	3–0	3–1		3–0	3–0	3–0	1–3	3–2	3–0	3–0
EAC Lady Generals	0–3	0–3	0–3		3–2	0–3	2–3	3–1	0–3	0–3
JRU Lady Bombers	0–3	0–3	1–3	2–3		0–3	0–3	3–0	0–3	1–3
Lyceum Lady Pirates	2–3	0–3	0–3	3–2	3–2		2–3	3–1	0–3	0–3
Mapúa Lady Cardinals	2–3	1–3	0–3	0–3	3–0	2–3		3–1	1–3	3–1
San Beda Lady Red Spikers	1–3	1–3	0–3	3–0	0–3	3–2	0–3		2–3	0–3
San Sebastian Lady Stags	3–1	0–3	0–3	3–1	3–2	1–3	0–3	1–3		1–3
Perpetual Lady Altas	2–3	0–3	0–3	3–1	2–3	2–3	0–3	1–3	3–1	

Source: GMA Integrated News
Legend: Blue = left column team win; Red = top row team win.

=== Bracket ===
Semifinals (Nos. 1 & 2 have twice-to-beat advantage)
1	Benilde	3
4	Mapúa	1
2	Letran	3
3	Arellano	0

Finals (Best-of-three series)
1	Benilde	3	3
2	Letran	1	0
Third place playoff
4	Mapúa	2
3	Arellano	3

=== Semifinals ===
The top two seeds in the semifinals have the twice-to-beat advantage.

==== (1) Benilde vs. (4) Mapua ====
Benilde has the twice-to-beat advantage.

June 1, 2025; 02:30pm	Benilde Lady Blazers	3–1	Mapúa Lady Cardinals	Playtime Filoil Centre, San Juan
June 1, 2025; 02:30pm	(20–25, 25–15, 25–17, 25–18)			Playtime Filoil Centre, San Juan
June 1, 2025; 02:30pm	Benilde wins series in one game			Playtime Filoil Centre, San Juan

==== (2) Letran vs. (3) Arellano ====
Letran has the twice-to-beat advantage.

June 3, 2025; 02:30pm	Letran Lady Knights	3–0	Arellano Lady Chiefs	Playtime Filoil Centre, San Juan
June 3, 2025; 02:30pm	(30–28, 25–12, 25–21)			Playtime Filoil Centre, San Juan
June 3, 2025; 02:30pm	Letran wins series in one game			Playtime Filoil Centre, San Juan

=== Third place playoff ===
The third place playoff is between semifinal losers.

June 8, 2025; 10:00am	Arellano Lady Chiefs	3–2	Mapúa Lady Cardinals	Playtime Filoil Centre, San Juan
June 8, 2025; 10:00am	(25–27 25–22 29–31 20–25 15–9)			Playtime Filoil Centre, San Juan

=== Finals ===
The finals is a best-of-three playoff.

June 8, 2025; 02:30pm	Benilde Lady Blazers	3–1	Letran Lady Knights	Playtime Filoil Centre, San Juan; Attendance: 2,000+
June 8, 2025; 02:30pm	(26–28 26–24 25–16 25–19)			Playtime Filoil Centre, San Juan; Attendance: 2,000+

June 11, 2025; 02:30pm	Benilde Lady Blazers	3–0	Letran Lady Knights	Playtime Filoil Centre, San Juan; Attendance: 5,000+
June 11, 2025; 02:30pm	(25–19 25–22 25–19)			Playtime Filoil Centre, San Juan; Attendance: 5,000+
June 11, 2025; 02:30pm	Benilde wins Finals, 2–0			Playtime Filoil Centre, San Juan; Attendance: 5,000+

- Finals MVP: Francis Mycah Go (Benilde Lady Blazers)
- Coach of the Year: Rogelio Getigan (Benilde Lady Blazers)

=== Awards ===
NCAA Season 100 women's volleyball champions
Benilde Lady Blazers
Fifth title, fourth consecutive title

- Most Valuable Player: Francis Mycah Go (Benilde Lady Blazers)
- Rookie of the Year: Sheena Vanessa Sarie (Letran Lady Knights)
- Freshman of the Year: Sheena Vanessa Sarie (Letran Lady Knights)
- 1st best outside spiker: Francis Mycah Go (Benilde Lady Blazers)
  - 2nd best outside spiker: Sheena Vanessa Sarie (Letran Lady Knights)
- 1st best middle blocker: Zamantha Nolasco (Benilde Lady Blazers)
  - 2nd best middle blocker: Kristine Joy Dionisio (San Sebastian Lady Stags)
- Best opposite spiker: Judiel Marie Nitura (Letran Lady Knights)
- Best Setter: Catherine Domasig (Arellano Lady Chiefs)
- Best libero: Lara Mae Silva (Letran Lady Knights)

==== Players of the Week ====
The Collegiate Press Corps awards a "player of the week" on Mondays for performances on the preceding week.

Week	Player	Team	Ref.
Week 1	Winnie Bedaña	Perpetual Lady Altas	
Week 2	Nizelle Aeriyen Martin	Letran Lady Knights	
Week 3	Vanessa Sarie	Letran Lady Knights	
Week 4	Samantha Gabrielle Tiratira	Arellano Lady Chiefs	
Week 5	Wielyn Estoque	Benilde Lady Blazers	
Week 6	Alyana Nicole Ong	Mapúa Lady Cardinals	
Week 7	Johna Dolorito	Lyceum Lady Pirates	
Week 8	Gia Marcel Maquilang	Letran Lady Knights	
Week 9	Vanessa Sarie	Letran Lady Knights	
Week 10	Zamantha Nolasco	Benilde Lady Blazers	

== Boys' tournament ==
=== Elimination round ===
==== Team standings ====
Pos	Team	Pld	W	L	Pts	SW	SL	SR	SPW	SPL	SPR	Qualification
1	Perpetual Junior Altas	9	9	0	26	18	1	18.000	474	341	1.390	Twice-to-beat in the semifinals
2	Letran Squires	9	8	1	23	17	5	3.400	510	436	1.170	Twice-to-beat in the semifinals
3	Malayan Junior Spikers	9	7	2	19	14	6	2.333	473	440	1.075	Twice-to-win in the semifinals
4	Arellano Braves (H)	9	6	3	20	14	6	2.333	493	391	1.261	Twice-to-win in the semifinals
5	JRU Light Bombers	9	5	4	14	10	9	1.111	398	423	0.941	
6	EAC–ICA Brigadiers	9	4	5	9	6	12	0.500	447	474	0.943	
7	Lyceum Junior Pirates	9	3	6	10	8	11	0.727	469	481	0.975	
8	San Beda Junior Red Spikers	9	2	7	7	5	14	0.357	381	457	0.834	
9	San Sebastian Staglets	9	1	8	5	5	17	0.294	460	536	0.858	
10	La Salle Green Hills Greenies	9	0	9	2	2	18	0.111	379	501	0.756	

Rules for classification: 1) Number of wins; 2) match points; 3) sets ratio; 4) points ratio; 5) head-to-head record
(H) Host

Team ╲ Game	1	2	3	4	5	6	7	8	9
Arellano	Mapua school colors	Lyceum school colors	EAC school colors	San Beda school colors	JRU school colors	CSB school colors	SSC-R school colors	UPHD school colors	Letran school colors
Letran	CSB school colors	UPHD school colors	Mapua school colors	Lyceum school colors	EAC school colors	San Beda school colors	JRU school colors	SSC-R school colors	Arellano school colors
EAC–ICA	San Beda school colors	SSC-R school colors	Arellano school colors	UPHD school colors	Letran school colors	Lyceum school colors	Mapua school colors	JRU school colors	CSB school colors
JRU	Lyceum school colors	Mapua school colors	CSB school colors	SSC-R school colors	Arellano school colors	UPHD school colors	Letran school colors	EAC school colors	San Beda school colors
LSGH	Letran school colors	San Beda school colors	JRU school colors	Mapua school colors	SSC-R school colors	Arellano school colors	UPHD school colors	Lyceum school colors	EAC school colors
Lyceum–Cavite	JRU school colors	Arellano school colors	UPHD school colors	Letran school colors	Mapua school colors	EAC school colors	San Beda school colors	CSB school colors	SSC-R school colors
Malayan	Arellano school colors	JRU school colors	Letran school colors	CSB school colors	Lyceum school colors	SSC-R school colors	EAC school colors	San Beda school colors	UPHD school colors
San Beda–Rizal	EAC school colors	CSB school colors	SSC-R school colors	Arellano school colors	UPHD school colors	Letran school colors	Lyceum school colors	Mapua school colors	JRU school colors
San Sebastian	UPHD school colors	EAC school colors	San Beda school colors	JRU school colors	CSB school colors	Mapua school colors	Arellano school colors	Letran school colors	Lyceum school colors
Perpetual	SSC-R school colors	Letran school colors	Lyceum school colors	EAC school colors	San Beda school colors	JRU school colors	CSB school colors	Arellano school colors	Mapua school colors

= Win; = Loss

==== Scores ====
Teams	AU	CSJL	EAC–ICA	JRU	LSGH	LPU–C	MHSS	SBU–R	SSC–R	UPHSD
Arellano Braves		1–2	2–0	2–0	2–0	2–0	1–2	2–0	2–0	0–2
Letran Squires			2–0	2–0	2–0	2–0	2–0	2–0	2–1	1–2
EAC–ICA Brigadiers				0–2	2–1	2–1	0–2	2–0	2–1	0–2
JRU Light Bombers					2–0	2–1	0–2	2–0	2–0	0–2
La Salle Green Hills Greenies						0–2	0–2	0–2	1–2	0–2
Lyceum Junior Pirates							0–2	2–1	2–0	0–2
Malayan Junior Spikers								2–0	2–1	0–2
San Beda Junior Red Spikers									2–0	0–2
San Sebastian Staglets										0–2
Perpetual Junior Altas										

Legend: Blue = left column team win; Red = top row team win.

=== Bracket ===
Semifinals (Nos. 1 & 2 have twice-to-beat advantage)
1	Perpetual	3
4	Arellano	1
2	Letran	3
3	Malayan	1

Finals (Best-of-three series)
1	Perpetual	3	1	3
2	Letran	0	3	2
Third place playoff
4	Arellano	3
3	Malayan	0

*If necessary

=== Semifinals ===
The top two seeds in the semifinals have the twice-to-beat advantage.

==== (1) Perpetual vs. (4) Arellano ====
Perpetual has the twice-to-beat advantage.

May 22, 2025	Perpetual Junior Altas	3–1	Arellano Braves	Arellano University; Attendance: 300+
May 22, 2025	(25–19, 25–17, 23–25, 25–22)			Arellano University; Attendance: 300+
May 22, 2025	Perpetual wins series in one game			Arellano University; Attendance: 300+

==== (2) Letran vs. (3) Malayan ====
Letran has the twice-to-beat advantage.

May 22, 2025	Letran Squires	3–1	Malayan Junior Spikers	Arellano University; Attendance: 300+
May 22, 2025	(21–25, 25–20, 25–21, 25–16)			Arellano University; Attendance: 300+
May 22, 2025	Letran wins series in one game			Arellano University; Attendance: 300+

=== Third place playoff ===
The third place playoff is between semifinal losers.

May 29, 2025; 10:00am	Malayan Junior Spikers	0–3	Arellano Braves	Arellano University Gym
May 29, 2025; 10:00am	(16–25, 17–25, 18–25)			Arellano University Gym

=== Finals ===
The finals is a best-of-three playoff.

May 30, 2025; 01:00pm	Perpetual Junior Altas	3–0	Letran Squires	Playtime Filoil Centre, San Juan
May 30, 2025; 01:00pm	(25–21, 29–27, 28–26)			Playtime Filoil Centre, San Juan

June 3, 2025; 08:00am	Perpetual Junior Altas	1–3	Letran Squires	Playtime Filoil Centre, San Juan
June 3, 2025; 08:00am	(20–25, 25–19, 20–25, 21–25)			Playtime Filoil Centre, San Juan

June 2025; 06:00pm	Perpetual Junior Altas	3–2	Letran Squires	Playtime Filoil Centre, San Juan
June 2025; 06:00pm	(25–21, 23–25, 21–25, 25–17, 15–9)			Playtime Filoil Centre, San Juan
June 2025; 06:00pm	Perpetual wins series, 2–1			Playtime Filoil Centre, San Juan

- Finals MVP: John Weihanan Lat (Perpetual Junior Altas)
- Coach of the Year: Sandy Rieta (Perpetual Junior Altas)

=== Awards ===
NCAA Season 100 boys' volleyball champions
Perpetual Junior Altas
13th title

- Most Valuable Player: Kim Cris Liray (Mapúa Red Robins)
- 1st best outside spiker: Kim Cris Liray (Mapúa Red Robins)
  - 2nd best outside spiker: Jessel king Nimo (Letran Squires)
- 1st best middle blocker: Liam Mojica (Lyceum Junior Pirates)
  - 2nd best middle blocker: Zyro Ornos (Perpetual Junior Altas)
- Best opposite spiker: Nasty Vergel Balajadia (Letran Squires)
- Best setter: John Junas Ariola (Letran Squires)
- Best libero: Aron Jazul (La Salle Green Hills Greenies)

== Girls' tournament ==
=== Elimination round ===
==== Team standings ====
Pos	Team	Pld	W	L	Pts	SW	SL	SR	SPW	SPL	SPR	Qualification
1	Perpetual Junior Lady Altas	6	6	0	17	12	1	12.000	307	237	1.295	Twice-to-beat in the semifinals
2	Arellano Lady Braves (H)	6	5	1	12	10	5	2.000	358	272	1.316	Twice-to-beat in the semifinals
3	EAC–ICA Lady Brigadiers	6	4	2	14	8	4	2.000	347	280	1.239	Twice-to-win in the semifinals
4	Lyceum Junior Lady Pirates	6	3	3	9	7	7	1.000	269	271	0.993	Twice-to-win in the semifinals
5	JRU Light Lady Bombers	6	2	4	8	6	5	1.200	369	308	1.198	
6	San Beda Junior Lady Red Spikers	6	1	5	3	2	10	0.200	193	289	0.668	
7	La Salle Lady Greenies	6	0	6	0	0	12	0.000	172	300	0.573	

Rules for classification: 1) Number of wins; 2) match points; 3) sets ratio; 4) points ratio; 5) head-to-head record
(H) Host

==== Match-up results ====
Team ╲ Game	1	2	3	4	5	6
Arellano	CSB school colors	San Beda school colors	JRU school colors	Lyceum school colors	EAC school colors	UPHD school colors
EAC–ICA	UPHD school colors	San Beda school colors	Lyceum school colors	CSB school colors	Arellano school colors	JRU school colors
JRU	UPHD school colors	CSB school colors	Lyceum school colors	Arellano school colors	San Beda school colors	EAC school colors
LSGH	Arellano school colors	JRU school colors	UPHD school colors	EAC school colors	San Beda school colors	Lyceum school colors
Lyceum–Cavite	San Beda school colors	JRU school colors	EAC school colors	Arellano school colors	UPHD school colors	CSB school colors
San Beda–Rizal	Lyceum school colors	Arellano school colors	EAC school colors	UPHD school colors	JRU school colors	CSB school colors
Perpetual	JRU school colors	EAC school colors	CSB school colors	San Beda school colors	Lyceum school colors	Arellano school colors

= Win; = Loss

==== Scores ====
Teams	AU	EAC–ICA	JRU	LSGH	LPU–C	SBU–R	UPHSD
Arellano Lady Braves		2–1	2–1	2–0	2–1	2–0	0–2
EAC–ICA Lady Brigadiers			2–0	2–0	2–0	2–0	1–2
JRU Light Lady Bombers				2–0	1–2	2–0	0–2
La Salle Lady Greenies					0–2	0–2	0–2
Lyceum Junior Lady Pirates						2–0	0–2
San Beda Red Lioness Cubs							0–2
Perpetual Junior Lady Altas							

Legend: Blue = left column team win; Red = top row team win.

=== Bracket ===
Semifinals (Nos. 1 & 2 have twice-to-beat advantage)
1	Perpetual	2	3
4	Lyceum–Cavite	3	0
2	Arellano	3
3	EAC–ICA	0

Finals (Best-of-three series)
1	Perpetual	1	2
2	Arellano	3	3
Third place playoff
4	Lyceum–Cavite	0
3	EAC–ICA	3

=== Semifinals ===
The top two seeds in the semifinals have the twice-to-beat advantage.

==== (1) Perpetual vs. (4) Lyceum-Cavite ====
Perpetual has the twice-to-beat advantage.

May 22, 2025	Perpetual Junior Lady Altas	2–3	Lyceum Junior Lady Pirates	Arellano University; Attendance: 300+
May 22, 2025	(23–25, 18–25, 25–16, 25–18, 12–15)			Arellano University; Attendance: 300+

May 26, 2025	Perpetual Junior Lady Altas	3–0	Lyceum Junior Lady Pirates	Arellano University; Attendance: 300+
May 26, 2025	(25–18, 25–22, 25–20)			Arellano University; Attendance: 300+
May 26, 2025	Perpetual wins series in two games			Arellano University; Attendance: 300+

==== (2) Arellano vs. (3) EAC-ICA ====
Arellano has the twice-to-beat advantage.

May 22, 2025	Arellano Lady Braves	3–0	EAC–ICA Lady Brigadiers	Arellano University; Attendance: 300+
May 22, 2025	(25–23, 25–16, 25–16)			Arellano University; Attendance: 300+
May 22, 2025	Arellano wins series in one game			Arellano University; Attendance: 300+

=== Third place playoff ===
The third place playoff is between semifinal losers.

May 29, 2025; 08:00am	EAC–ICA Lady Brigadiers	3–0	Lyceum Junior Lady Pirates	Arellano University Gym
May 29, 2025; 08:00am	(27–25, 27–25, 25–20)			Arellano University Gym

=== Finals ===
The finals is a best-of-three playoff.

May 30, 2025; 08:00am	Perpetual Junior Lady Altas	1–3	Arellano Lady Braves	Playtime Filoil Centre, San Juan
May 30, 2025; 08:00am	(26–28, 18–25, 25–22, 19–25)			Playtime Filoil Centre, San Juan

June 1, 2025; 08:00am	Perpetual Junior Lady Altas	2–3	Arellano Lady Braves	Playtime Filoil Centre, San Juan
June 1, 2025; 08:00am	(25–21, 25–15, 16–25, 11–25, 4–15)			Playtime Filoil Centre, San Juan
June 1, 2025; 08:00am	Arellano wins series, 2–0			Playtime Filoil Centre, San Juan

- Finals MVP: Samantha Hillary Maranan (Arellano Lady Braves)
- Coach of the Year: Roberto Javier (Arellano Lady Braves)

=== Awards ===
NCAA Season 100 girls' volleyball champions
Arellano Lady Braves
First title

- Most Valuable Player: Samantha Hillary Maranan (Arellano Lady Braves)
- 1st best outside spiker: Samantha Hillary Maranan (Arellano Lady Braves)
  - 2nd best outside spiker: Angel Joy Perez (EAC–ICA Lady Brigadiers)
- 1st best middle blocker: Julyana Servantes (JRU Light Lady Bombers)
  - 2nd best middle blocker: Ashley Turiado (EAC–ICA Lady Brigadiers)
- Best opposite spiker: Mayang Aryana Javier (Perpetual Junior Lady Altas)
- Best setter: Carlyn Maneja (Arellano Lady Braves)
- Best libero: Liezel Canabot (JRU Light Lady Bombers)

== See also ==
- UAAP Season 87 volleyball tournaments

Preceded by Season 99 (2024)	NCAA volleyball tournaments Season 100 (2025)	Succeeded by Season 101 (2026)
