= Noel Kampton =

Filipino volleyball player (born 2000)

Personal information
- Nationality: Filipino
- Born: April 2, 2000 (age 26)
- Home town: Mandaluyong, Philippines
- Education: De La Salle University
- Height: 1.88 m (6 ft 2 in)
- Spike: 350 cm (138 in)
- Block: 336 cm (132 in)

Volleyball information
- Position: Outside Hitter
- Current club: PSNKK
- Number: 9

Career
- Years: Team
- 2025: Criss Cross King Crunchers
- 2025–present: PSNKK

Noel Michael Kampton (born April 2, 2000) is a Filipino beach and indoor volleyball player. He last played for the Criss Cross King Crunchers of the Spikers' Turf.

== Career ==
=== High school ===
Kampton played for the Perpetual Junior Altas boys' volleyball team in the NCAA volleyball championship. In four years, Kampton won three NCAA Juniors Indoor Volleyball titles and one Beach Volleyball title.

=== Collegiate ===
Kampton committed to the De La Salle Green Spikers in 2020, mainly due to coach Arnold Laniog being part of the staff whom he had known since his elementary days.

Kampton was supposed to debut for the De La Salle in UAAP Season 83 but due to the COVID-19 pandemic, the tournament was canceled.

In UAAP Season 84, he made his first game appearance with the De La Salle Green Archers beach volleyball where he and his teammate Vince Maglinao won the bronze medal.

In UAAP Season 85, he made his first game appearance in the UAAP collegiate indoor volleyball with the De La Salle Green Archers. His team placed in 4th after losing to FEU in the first round of stepladder semifinals.

=== Club ===
In June 2025, Kampton joined Spikers' Turf team, Criss Cross King Crunchers. He also signed with the PSNKK Club of the Volleyball Thailand League and was expected to join the Thai club in December. However, he opted to step back due to homesickness and focused on spending time with his wife and son. Afterwards, he was readmitted to the Criss Cross King Crunchers and is currently playing at the 2026 Spikers' Turf Open Conference. He won his first senior championship with Criss Cross after the team defeated guest team Kindai University in the 2025 Invitational Conference

== Awards ==
=== Individual ===
Year	League	Season/Conference	Award	Ref
2016	UAAP (Junior's)	78	Rookie of the Year	
2016	UAAP (Junior's)	78	Best Attacker	
2018	NCAA (Junior's)	93	1st Best Outside Spiker	
2019	NCAA (Junior's)	94 (Indoor)	2nd Best Outside Spiker	
2019	NCAA (Junior's)	94 (Beach)	MVP	
2022	UAAP (Beach)	84	Rookie of the Year	
2023	V-League	Collegiate	MVP (Finals)	
2023	V-League	Collegiate	1st Best Outside Spiker	

=== Collegiate ===
Year	League	Season/Conference	Title	Ref
2023	V-League	Collegiate	Champions	
2024	V-League	Collegiate	Runner-up	
