= List of 2023 Spikers' Turf Invitational Conference squads =

The 2023 Spikers' Turf Invitational Conference featured 25 teams. Below are the rosters of each team.

== Alpha Omega Elite Spikers ==
Alpha Omega Elite Spikers
No.	Name	Position
1	ENCILA, Ivan	OH
2	GUINTO, Arman Clarence	OH
5	FORTUNA, Michael John	OP
7	CURAMEN, Anfernee	MB
8	ALFARO, Ricardo	L
9	SUNDIANG, Stephen Jason	L
11	PALISOC, Razzel	OP
13	TAN, Kim (c)	OH
15	DESUYO, John Carlo	S
16	CABILLAN,Jethro	MB
17	SEQUITIN, Jay	MB
18	TEO, Jan Laurence	S
19	DIWA, John Daniel	MB
23	RACAZA, France Lander	OH
	Edjet Mabbayad	HC

== Ateneo–Fudgee Barr Blue Eagles ==
Ateneo-Fudgee Barr Blue Eagles
No.	Name	Position
1	OKEKE, Chidiebere Emmanuel	OH
2	CRISOSTOMO, Leinuel	L
3	GUTIERREZ, Lorenzo Samuel	S
4	GOPIO, Jettlee	MB
5	BATAS, Kennedy	OP
6	TANEO, Lutrelle Andre	OH
7	LICAUCO, James Daniel	S
8	PACINIO, Amil Jr.	OH
10	DACULAN, Ryan	MB
11	TALUBAN, Eijra Kayelle	S
12	MANGULABNAN, Jan Frederick King	S
13	DE CASTRO, Lance Andrei (c)	L
14	DE GUZMAN, Cyrus Justin	MB
16	ALMANDRO, Andrei John	OH
17	SENDON, Jeric	OP
18	SALARZON, Jian Matthew	OH
21	BATAC, Tim Rodniel	OH
22	GARCIA, Arvin	MB
	Timmy Sto. Tomas	HC

== EcoOil–La Salle Green Oilers ==
EcoOil-La Salle Green Oilers
No.	Name	Position
1	RONQUILLO, John Mark (c)	OP
2	JAVIER, Joaquin Antonio	L
4	MENDOZA, Uriel	OH
5	MARATA, Von	OP
6	GUERRERO, Menard	L
8	POQUITA, Diogenes	S
9	KAMPTON, Michael Noel	OH
10	ESPEJO, Andre	OH
11	GLORIA, Eugene	OH
12	ENCARNACION, Simon Joseph	S
13	DEL PILAR, Nathaniel	MB
15	LAYUG, Eric Paolo	MB
16	DE CASTRO, Jonathan	L
17	MAGLINAO, Vince Gerard	OH
18	DE JESUS, Jules Carlo	OH
20	VENTURA, Glen Rui	OP
21	AGUSTINES, Angelo Miguel	S
22	RODRIGUEZ, Joshua Jamiei	MB
23	HERNANDEZ, Chris Emmanuel	OH
	Jose Monsol Roque	HC

== Don Pacundo–DLSU Dasmariñas Patriots ==
Don Pacundo-DLSU Dasmariñas Patriots
No.	Name	Position
1	ALABIN, John Albert Philip	OH
2	DECENA, Romar	L
4	CRUZ, Renz	MB
5	DELOS REYES, Christian Joshua	MB
6	HIDALGO, Christian Audie	S
7	FRANCISCO, Francis Allen	OP
8	ESCABAL, Earl Trivon	MB
9	BALAHIM, Ryan Lester	OP
10	SASIS, Valeriano (c)	MB
11	BRIMON, Donald Edrian	S
12	TURDANES, Emiel	OH
13	SUMAGUE, Chin Khailo	OH
14	BATTUNG, Christian	OH
15	SAPITANAN, Carll Louie	OH
16	GENIDO, Genfrix Lorenz	OP
17	PONIENTE, Marjhon	MB
19	VILLEGAS, Maximo	MB
21	ACEDILLA, Rafael	OP
23	MALAIBA, Paul Bryan	OP
25	TABUCLAO, Bryle Jayvee	L
	Jerome Roland Mirano	HC

== Cabstars–Cabuyao ==
Cabstars-Cabuyao
No.	Name	Position
1	CABALLERO, Jake	OP
2	PINEDA, Mac	MB
3	RAMILO, Joshua	OH
4	DASIG, Miguel Andrew	OP
5	PENDEL, Walter	MB
6	TONGIO, Andrei Smart	S
7	MAGSINO, Gabriel Jeih	MB
8	CAPACETE, John Ervin	MB
9	TRIBIANA, Ramzie	OP
10	EFREN, Carl Aaron	S
11	GARCIA, Joshua Ray	OH
12	CENTENO, Aljune (c)	L
14	BUSTAMANTE, Michael	L
15	DORIA, Michael Christian	MB
16	SORIANO, Jomar	OH
17	PENAS, Angelo	OH
19	PANGANIBAN, Dominic	OP
23	ADAJAR, Jerico	S
24	GOROSPE, John Nathaniel	S
	Christian Antiporta	HC

== Chef on a Diet–FEU Tamaraws ==
Chef on a Diet-FEU Tamaraws
No.	Name	Position
1	DOMINGO, Herald	MB
2	CODILLA, Jomel	OH
3	CACAO, Ariel	S
4	DE GUZMAN, Raymond Bryce	L
5	TALISAYAN, Jelord	OH
7	SERCENA, Ivan Timothy	L
8	SABANAL, Reymond	MB
9	SAAVEDRA, Zhydryx	OP
10	ADECIR, Glen Harvey	OH
11	MENDOZA, Lirick John	MB
12	CELAJES, Jacob	L
13	SABADO, Mark Vergel	OP
14	BUGAOAN, Martin	MB
15	DELICANA, Andrei	OH
16	ABUNIAWAN, Jefferson	MB
17	MARTINEZ, Benny (c)	S
20	MANAHAN, Jabez	L
22	ABSIN, Charles David	MB
24	GARRIEDO, Judi Laurence	OP
25	ESPARTERO, Mikko	OH
	Eddieson Orcullo	HC

== Cignal HD Spikers ==
Cignal HD Spikers
No.	Name	Position
1	MONTERO, Sandy Domenick	L
2	UMANDAL, Joshua	OH
3	CALADO, Mark Frederick	OH
4	TORRES, Peter Den Mar	MB
5	BONONO, Edmar Lutcha	OH
6	FAYTAREN, Alexis	MB
7	BUGAOAN, John Paul	MB
8	MARASIGAN, Ysrael Wilson (c)	OP
9	ASIA, Geuel Dela Cruz	S
10	MIGUEL, Wendel Concepcion	OH
11	VALBUENA, Alfred Gerald	OP
12	NJIGHA, Chumason Celestine	MB
13	SUMAGUID III, Manuel Diangson	L
14	ABROT, Ruvince	OH
18	CASANA, Gabriel EJ	S
20	JOSAFAT, Lloyd	MB
	Dexter Clamor	HC

== Davies Paint–Adamson Soaring Falcons ==
Davies Paint-Adamson Soaring Falcons
No.	Name	Position
1	AGUILAR, Jude Christian	MB
2	CANLAS, Lorence	L
3	RAMIREZ, John Rodney	L
4	YBOA, John Anthony	OP
5	MENOR, Joel	OH
6	BERMUDEZ, Francis	S
7	GAY, John Eugenio (c)	OP
8	COGUIMBAL, Mark Leo	MB
9	GUTIERREZ, Dan Russell	OH
10	CASAS, Francis	OH
11	DOMINGO, Lourenz	S
12	PAULINO, Marc Kenneth	OH
13	MANATO, Neil	L
14	BALLON, Jason	MB
15	LAJA, Mustadil	OH
16	DONGON, Jhan Rey Fritz	MB
18	BAPTISTA, Rommel	OH
20	TAN, Manuel Iverson	OP
22	HITONES, John Willie	OH
23	TAHILLUDIN, Ahmed Vezie	OH
	George Pascua	HC

== D' Navigators Iloilo ==
D' Navigators Iloilo
No.	Name	Position
1	ADAO, Rick	U
2	VILLAMOR, Kyle Angelo	OH
3	ENGAY, Renz Angelo	OP
4	CORDEZ, Jerome Michael (c)	OH
5	DE PEDRO, Deanne Neil	OP
6	APOLINARIO, John Michael	S
7	SAURA, Francis	OP
8	CHUMBINGCO, Mark Anthony	U
9	TORRES, Giles Jeffer	MB
10	LIM, John Mark	MB
11	DORONILA, Paolo Gabriel	OH
12	SABANDO, Kent	OH
13	GWAZA, Mfena	MB
14	NURSIDDIK, Rash	MB
15	LORENZO, Vince Patrick	L
18	GAMPONG, Madzlan Allian	OP
21	FERRER, Aldre	S
22	ESPANSO, Jhonmark	L
23	ESPENIDA, Joshua	OP
	Boyet Delmoro	HC

== MKA–San Beda Red Spikers ==
MKA-San Beda Red Spikers
No.	Name	Position
1	CASTAÑEDA, Dominic	S
2	ALMARIO, Carlo	L
3	DELA CRUZ, Eddie Jong	U
4	BOOK, Axel Van	OP
5	BAKIL, Anrie	MB
6	LOPEZ, Jerome	S
7	MUNSING, Greg Alener	MB
8	BALDOS, Mark Jason	S
10	CABALSA, Ralph	OP
11	SANTOS, Justine	MB
12	SARMIENTO, Lloyd	U
13	MONTEMAYOR, Mark Kevin	OP
14	RUS, Aidjien Josh (c)	L
15	BUHAY, Jiacomo Ken	MB
16	TAHILUDDIN, Mohammad Shaif Ali	OH
18	ROSMAN, Ryan	OH
19	KASIM, Edwin	OH
21	MILJANI, Alsenal	OP
23	TOLENTINO, Arnel	OP
24	SAROL, Venchie	MB
	Ariel Dela Cruz	HC

== Sta. Elena–NU Nationals ==
Sta. Elena-NU Nationals
No.	Name	Position
1	ALMENDRAS, Angelo Nicolas	OH
2	ANCHETA, Greg Augustus Luis	S
4	HERNANDEZ, Michael Jonas	L
5	ABANILLA, Jan Llanfred	OP
6	BUDDIN, Michaelo	OH
7	PARCE, Kharylle Rhoy	MB
8	SUMAGUI, Jann Mariano	L
9	LUMANLAN, Louis Emmanuel	MB
10	MUKABA, Obed	MB
11	DISQUITADO, Jade Alex	OH
12	TAGUIBOLOS, Rwenzmel	MB
13	RETAMAR, Ave Joshua (c)	S
15	ESTRADA, John Vincent	MB
16	BELOSTRINO, Clarenz	S
17	ORDIALES, Leo	MB/OPP
18	ARINGO, Leo Jr.	OP
19	DOROMAL, Joelbert	OH
23	DIAO, Jenngerard Arnfranz	MB
24	BANDOLA, Mac Arvin	OH
25	GAPULTOS, Jimwell	L
	Dante Alinsunurin	HC

== PGJC–Navy Sea Lions ==
PGJC Navy Sea Lions
No.	Name	Position
1	VILLANUEVA, Marvin	OP
3	CELIS, Christian	L
6	ALICANDO, Geffrey	MB
9	PADON, Sean Victor	S
10	PAGULONG, Alfredo	OH
11	LIOC, Omar	MB
12	CAMPOSANO, Edward	OH
13	KALINGKING, Jack	L
14	HAIRAMI, Marvin (c)	S
15	QUIEL, Peter	MB
16	DOLOR, Gregorio	OH
17	SAPIDA, Wilbert Jasyon	MB
18	DELA VEGA, Joeven	OP
19	CARANGUIAN, Jeric	OH
20	MARCELINO, Christian	OH
25	SUAREZ, Owen Jaime	S
	Cecille Cruzada	HC

== Philippine Air Force Airmen ==
Philippine Air Force Airmen
No.	Name	Position
1	CALASIN, Ralph Christian	MB
2	ANCHETTA, Jann Paul	U
3	VILLEGAS, Ronchette Lee	S
4	NUÑEZ, John Philip	L
5	RAMONES, Kyle Adrian	MB
6	JERUZ, Niño	MB
7	LABRADOR, Rodolfo (c)	OH
9	MACLANG, Marco Ely	MB
10	AVILA, Arvin	L
11	ABDILLA, Alnakran	OH
12	RUECA, Reginald	MB
15	RUECA, Primo Enrique	OH
16	LOMINGIN, Leo	OH
17	LOPEZ, Jessie	S
18	TOLENTINO, Edwin	OH
19	DE OCAMPO, Pitrus Paolo	S
20	SERRANO, Joshua	MB
21	INAUDITO, Ruben	OP
25	DELIZO, Derick Lerry	MB
27	DIZON, Darwin	OH
	Jhimson Merza	HC

== PCU Dasmariñas–Saskin Dolphins ==
PCU Dasmariñas-SASKIN Dolphins
No.	Name	Position
1	LARA, Jul Symond	S
2	SAGUN, John Patrick	L
3	BALDEMOR, Yvan Raphael	OP
4	HONRA, Reynald David	OP
5	PERALTA, Charles Patrick	OH
6	ALVIOR, Jhet Daius	MB
7	LARA, Sean Kester	MB
8	ALFILER, Edmarron	S
9	FAILANO, Rhenzoe	OH
10	GABRIDO, Edison	L
11	ZOLETA, Mjay	OH
12	DELA CRUZ, Gaylord Ivan	OH
13	MANDAPAT, Jay	MB
14	AGATEP, Lan Carlo	OP
15	MONFORTE, Kayle Jasper	MB
17	SAPIDA, Joshua Joebert (c)	MB
	Reygan Espera	HC

== Perpetual–Kinto Altas ==
Perpetual-Kinto Altas
No.	Name	Position
1	MATEO, Klint	OP
2	MARAPOC, Jefferson	OH
4	TABUGA, Kobe	OH
5	MEDALLA, Micheal	MB
8	TEODORO, Paul	L
9	CODENIERA, Sean Archer	OP
10	RAMIREZ, Leo	OH
11	ENARCISO, John Christian (c)	S
12	LITUANIA, John Exequel	S
13	GELOGO, Kylle	MB
14	RAMIREZ, Louie	OH
15	ARROZADO, Dexter	OH
16	ROSOS, Kirth	MB
17	CASTIL, John	MB
18	PEPITO, John Philip	L
21	ANDARE, KC	MB
	Sammy Acaylar	HC

== Philippine Army Troopers ==
Philippine Army Troopers
No.	Name	Position
1	RAMIREZ, Karlle Nico	S
2	ULIBAS, JR Ferdinand	OH
3	BARRICA, Joshua	OH
5	LABIDE, Benjaylo (c)	OH
6	UY, Jason	L
8	BALOALOA, Ariel Kenneth	MB
9	LIBERATO, Kevin	MB
10	BAYKING, John Kenneth	L
11	OXCIANO, Edmar	OH
13	MEDINA, Manuel Andrie	OH
14	ABDULMAJID, Jaidal	OH
15	DEPAMAYLO, Nikki	S
16	VILLONSON, Joel	MB
18	ENSISO, Mark Christian	OH
21	DAIS, Al-mujib	S
	Melvin Carolino	HC

== Philippine Coast Guard Lifesavers ==
Philippine Coast Guard Lifesavers
No.	Name	Position
1	ADAM, Aidam	OH
2	GATDULA, Rudy	OH
3	MIJARES, John Carl	L
4	BATOSALEM, Rodolf	S
5	VIZCARRA, Virgilio	MB
6	MANINGDING, Adrian	OP
7	DE LA VEGA, John Kevin (c)	OH
8	DEL PILAR Rafael	MB
9	HU, Rhenze Edmund	L
10	ABDULWAHAB, Al Frazin	S
11	FRANCISCO, Lerry John	MB
12	ATIENZA, Aldrin	MB
13	GARCIA, Dan Fernando	MB
14	GALVEZ, Leo Eleazar	OP
15	MOLINYAWE, Jonarth Prepose	OH
17	JAJULI, Ridwan	MB
	John Sen Rivadenera	HC

== Saints and Lattes–Letran Saints Spikers ==
Saints and Lattes-Letran Saints Spikers
No.	Name	Position
1	HIMZON, Vince Virrey	MB
2	BAUTISTA, John Derrick	OH
3	STA MARIA, Steven	OP
4	ARAÑO, John Wayne	S
5	CORONADO, John Lawrence	OP
6	PACQUING, Ned Calvert	OH
7	BERMIDO, Felix	MB
8	DE GUZMAN, Mark Raniel	S
9	BANGCOLA, Abdul Hafiz	S
10	JUMAPIT, Jumapit	OH
11	WINGCO, Keith Nolan	MB
12	LORENZO, John Paolo	OP
13	MOLACRUZ, Vhan Marco	L
14	CABALLERO, Namron Ellehcar	MB
15	OMEGA, John Edwin	MB
16	AMBORCIO, Christer Lou	OH
17	SANTIAGUDO, Jhon Francis Jeri	MB
18	VICENTE, Lorenz	OH
19	CATRIS, Raxel Redd (c)	L
21	DOMALANTA, Dennis	MB
	Brian Esquibel	HC

== Santa Rosa City Lions ==
Santa Rosa City Lions
No.	Name	Position
1	IJIRAN, Ruskin Joss	MB
2	LUMINES, Julian	OP
3	CAMAGANAKAN, Joven	OP
4	DUARTE, Errelle	OH
5	MARMETO, Rikko Marius	L
6	DE VERA, Levi	MB
7	MARGATE, Gene Lucky	MB
8	AQUINO, Ashbery John	MB
9	QUEZADA, Exequiel Harvey (c)	OH
10	SERFINO, Johnrex	L
11	ARESGADO, Gadpray	OP
13	ROSALES, Ronniel	MB
14	POLVOROSA, Esmilzo Joner	S
15	AISAL, Fahad	OH
17	HERNANDEZ, JR Jose	S
18	GAMPONG, Alihfaisal	OP
20	MUHALI, Ridzuan Janani	OH
21	MENESES, Victor	MB
24	AUSTRIA, Hero	OH
	Edward Jan Lirio	HC

== Savouge RTU Basilan Golden Thunder ==
Savouge RTU Basilan Golden Thunder
No.	Name	Position
1	ANTONIO, Renzel	OH
2	SEÑORON, Jhon Lorenz (c)	OH
3	MAGPAYO, Charlee	MB
4	LARGO, Jazzly	MB
5	SUPAT, Daven Ford	L
6	CONSTANTINO, Luke Malcolm	S
7	ENON, Jack	L
8	GLORIOSO, Gian	MB
9	VALLEJO, Jaive	OH
10	QUITO, Anthony	OP
11	DELA PEÑA, Mark Adrielle	OH
12	PAGDAYUNAN, Xyrill Piolo	MB
13	ALIH, Elman	OH
14	REYES, Ricardo Jr.	L
15	HERNANDEZ, John Kenneth	S
16	ARIAGA, Jeyar	OP
19	FERNANDEZ, Sammy	OH
20	GAYLAWAN, Kentrindel	OP
21	AMILBAHAR, Alnasim	U
22	DESEO, John Anthony	MB
	Sabtbl Abdul	HC

== St. Gerard Construction–Benilde Blazing Builders ==
St. Gerard Construction-Benilde Blazing Builders
No.	Name	Position
1	FAJARDO, Jericho Paolo	S
2	JORDAN, Paul Amadeo	OH
3	ONDEVILLA, Kevin Jonathan	OP
4	MARASIGAN, James Harold	OH
5	VILLANUEVA, Chris Lorenz	S
6	VALERA, Reiven Kyle	OH
7	REOLALAS, Joseph Benedict	OP
8	JABOLI, Leonard Van	OH
9	MOTOL, Rocky Roy	U
10	HERRERA, Jacob Agassi	OP
11	SULAYMAN, Alvinnazher	OH
12	BALBACAL, Mike Adrian	MB
13	TERO, John Carlo	MB
14	MANALO, Neil Ryan	MB
15	AGUILAR, Arnel Christian	OH
16	GOMEZ, Alvin Bryle (c)	L
17	CUENCA, Jeremi Pierre	L
18	AUSTERO, John Adriane	MB
19	RABANES, Al Bernard	U
	Arnold Laniog	HC

== The Bayleaf Hotels–Lyceum Pirates ==
The Bayleaf Hotels-Lyceum Pirates
No.	Name	Position
1	EDANG, Gian	OP
2	AQUINO, Jhon Icon	OH
3	INTING, Phil Nikirich	L
4	BAGO, Fritzvan Theo	MB
5	VELASCO, Josue III	OH
6	PALAD, Jansen	OP
7	EDANG, Jun (c)	OH
8	BENCITO, Sean Lewis	OP
9	LEGASPI, Micheal	S
10	POLIS, Earl Jericsson	MB
11	MORAL, Kian Carlo	L
12	GABISAN, Joseph	MB
13	RANARA, Vic Justine	S
14	LANARIO, Mark Kenneth	MB
15	ALCIRA, Jessie	OH
16	LIAO, Gilbert	OP
17	GUADAMOR, Rojie	OH
18	SANTOS, Isaiah	OH
19	DUMASIG, Chris John Louie	S
20	ANCAJAS, Richard Troy	MB
	Paul Jan Dolorias	HC

== VNS Griffins ==
VNS Griffins
No.	Name	Position
1	MANTAHINAY, Michael	S
2	CRUZ, John Joshua	L
3	BAGALAY, Philip Michael (c)	OH
4	FRONDA, Russel	MB
5	CRUZ, Lorence	S
6	VALMORIA, Kimuel John	L
7	SUMAGAYSAY, Jayvee	MB
8	PEDROSA, Jeremy	OP
9	LACUANAN, Ralph Aaron	MB
10	SAMSON, Veejay	S
11	ALDOVINO, Romel Angelo	MB
12	SALI, Albukharie	U
13	SAN ANDRES, Ben	OH
14	SEGUI, Charles Jordan	OH
15	SAPORNA, Sinmart	MB
17	ANTONIO, Christian Dave	S
18	MEDALLA, Ron	OH
	Ralph Ocampo	HC

== EAC–Xentromall Generals ==
EAC-Xentromall Generals
No.	Name	Position
1	OLIVO, Joshua	MB
3	OSABEL, Ervin Patrick	OH
5	MIÑA, Joshua	OH
7	CABRERA, Bryan Jay	OP
8	DIONES, Bhim Lawrence	L
9	ENCINA, Israel	MB
10	MAGADAN, Joshua Earl	L
11	BORNEL, Jester Noel	MB
12	SARIA, Dearborn	S
14	ABOR, Jan Ruther	OP
15	BATIANCILA, Kenneth (c)	MB
16	ROMERO, Marvin Williams	OH
17	TACULOG, Frelwin	OH
18	PAGLAON, John Michael	S
22	MANGARING, Juvie Mark	OH
25	SALONGA, Jerimaih	MB
	Rodrigo Palmero	HC

== Maruichi Hyogo ==
Maruichi Hyogo
No.	Name	Position
1	KURODA, Hinata (c)	OH
2	WAKAMATSU, Ren	L
3	ISSHIKI, Daichi	MB
4	IWAKURA, Keitaro	MB
5	OCHI, Taiga	
6	KATAHATA, Haya	L
9	KAWAGOE, Yugi	OH
10	MARUYAMA, Kyosuke	S
11	KOBATAKE, Yuki	
12	MUSHIAGE, Ryougu	
13	KOBAYASHI, Ryuto	OH
14	KASHIMOTO, Kyosuke	OP
15	NAGANO, Takumi	OH
16	HARADA, Shoka	OH
	Kota Kunichika	HC
