= 2023 V-League Collegiate Challenge =

2023 collegiate volleyball league

- League: V-League
- Sport: Volleyball
- Duration: August 16 – September 29, 2023
- Matches: M: 36; W: 36
- Teams: M: 8; W: 8
- TV partner: Solar Sports
- Season MVP: M Joshua Ybañez (UST); W Mary Rhose Dapol (Perpetual)
- Finals champions: M De La Salle Green Spikers; W Benilde Lady Blazers
- Runners-up: M UST Golden Spikers; W FEU Lady Tamaraws
- Finals MVP: M Noel Kampton (DLSU); W Gayle Pascual (Benilde)

V-League seasons
- ← 2022 2024 →

The 2023 V-League Collegiate Challenge was the second season of the revival of the V-League of the Philippines. The tournament started on August 16, 2023, at the Paco Arena in Manila, with both divisions having 8 competing teams.

== Participating teams ==
Team	School	Collegiate league
Men's division
Ateneo Blue Eagles	Ateneo de Manila University	UAAP
De La Salle Green Spikers	De La Salle University	UAAP
EAC Generals	Emilio Aguinaldo College	NCAA
FEU Tamaraws	Far Eastern University	UAAP
NU Bulldogs	National University	UAAP
Perpetual Altas	University of Perpetual Help System DALTA	NCAA
San Beda Red Spikers	San Beda University	NCAA
UST Golden Spikers	University of Santo Tomas	UAAP
Women's division
Benilde Lady Blazers	De La Salle–College of Saint Benilde	NCAA
Enderun Lady Titans	Enderun Colleges	NAASCU
FEU Lady Tamaraws	Far Eastern University	UAAP
Lyceum Lady Pirates	Lyceum of the Philippines University	NCAA
Mapúa Lady Cardinals	Mapua University	NCAA
San Sebastian Lady Stags	San Sebastian College – Recoletos	NCAA
Perpetual Lady Altas	University of Perpetual Help System DALTA	NCAA
UE Lady Warriors	University of the East	UAAP

== Venue ==
All matches
Manila
Paco Arena
Capacity: 1,000

== Format ==
Preliminary round

1. Single-round robin preliminaries; 8 teams; teams are ranked using the FIVB Ranking System.
2. Top four teams will advance to the semifinals.

Semifinals (best-of-three series)

1. SF1: rank #1 versus rank #4
2. SF2: rank #2 versus rank #3

Finals

1. Bronze medal (knockout series): SF1L vs. SF2L
2. Gold medal (best-of-three series): SF1W vs. SF2W

== Pool standing procedure ==
- First, teams are ranked by the number of matches won.
- If the number of matches won is tied, the tied teams are then ranked by match points, wherein:
  - Match won 3–0 or 3–1: 3 match points for the winner, 0 match points for the loser.
  - Match won 3–2: 2 match points for the winner, 1 match point for the loser.
- In case of any further ties, the following criteria shall be used:
  - Set ratio: the number of sets won divided by number of sets lost.
  - Point ratio: the number of points scored divided by the number of points allowed.
  - Head-to-head standings: any remaining tied teams are ranked based on the results of head-to-head matches involving the teams in question.

== Squads ==
=== Men's line-up ===
Ateneo Blue Eagles
No.	Player name	Position
2	CRISOSTOMO, Leinuel	L
3	GUTIERREZ, Lorenzo Samuel	S
4	GOPIO, Jettlee	MB
5	BATAS, Kennedy	OP
6	TANEO, Lutrelle Andre	OH
7	LICAUCO, James Daniel	S
8	PACINIO, Amil Jr.	OH
11	TALUBAN, Ejira Kayelle	S
12	MANGULABNAN, Jan Frederick King	S
13	DE CASTRO, Lance Andrei (C)	L
16	ALMADRO, Andrei John	OH
17	SENDON, Jeric	MB
18	SALARZON, Jian Matthew	OH
22	GARCIA, Arvin	MB
	STO. TOMAS, Timothy	Coach
	MANGULABNAN, Vince	Assistant

De La Salle Green Spikers
No.	Player name	Position
1	RONQUILLO, John Mark (C)	OP
2	JAVIER, Joaquin Antonio	L
4	MENDOZA, Uriel	OH
5	MARATA, Von	OP
6	GUERRERO, Menard	OH/OP
8	POQUITA, Diogenes III	S
9	KAMPTON, Noel Michael	OH
10	ESPEJO, Andre	OH
11	GLORIA, Eugene	OH
12	ENCARNARCION, Simon Joseph	S
13	DEL PILAR, Nathanie	MB
15	LAYUG, Eric Paolo	MB
17	MAGLINAO, Vince Gerard	OH
18	DE JESUS, Jules Carlo	OH/L
20	VENTURA, Glen Rui	OP
22	RODRIGUEZ, Joshua Jamiel	MB
	LANIOG, Arnold	Coach
	ROQUE, Jose	Assistant

EAC Generals
No.	Player name	Position
1	OLIVO, Joshua	MB
2	BUENVIAJE, John Ver	OP
3	OSABEL, Ervin Patrick	OH
4	CABACANG, Mark Justin	OP
5	PAGLAON, John Michael	S
6	BALDOZA, Ivan Rebb	OH
7	CABRERA, Bryan Jay	OP
8	DIONES, Bhim Lawrence (C)	L
9	SALONGA, Jerimaih	MB
10	SANTOS, Mark Joseph	L
11	BORNEL, Jester Noel	MB
12	SARIA, Dearborn	S
14	ABOR, Jan Ruther	OP
15	BATIANCILA, Kenneth	MB
16	ROMERO, Marvin Williams	OH
17	TACULOG, Frelwin	OH
18	DE LEON, Rogelio	OH
19	SALI, Zafrulla	OH
20	MAGPANTAY, Jan Francis	L
21	SAY, Paul Justine	OH
	PALMERO, Rodrigo	Coach
	GERELLA / MANGARING, Juvy	Assistant

FEU Tamaraws
No.	Player name	Position
2	CODILLA, Jomel	OH
3	CACAO, Ariel	S
4	DE GUZMAN, Bryce	L
5	TALISAYAN, Jerold	OH
8	SABANAL, Reymond	MB
9	SAAVEDRA, Zhydryx	OH/OP
10	MENDOZA, Lirick	MB
11	GARRIEDO, Judi	OH/OP
12	CEJALES, Jacob	L
14	BUGAOAN, Martin	MB
15	DELICANA, Andrei	OH
16	ABUNIAWAN, Jefferson	MB
17	MARTINEZ, Benny (C)	S
18	ADECIR, Glen	OH
	ORCULLO, Eddieson	Coach
	MANALON, F./ DULAY, R.	Assistant

NU Bulldogs
No.	Player name	Position
2	ANCHETA, Greg Augustus Luis	S
4	HERNANDEZ, Michael Jonas	L
5	ABANILLA, Jan Llanfred	OP
6	BUDDIN, Michaelo	OH
7	PARCE, Kharylle Rhoy	MB
10	MUKABA, Obed	MB
11	MALINIS, Kenry	OP
12	TAGUIBOLOS, Rwenzmel	MB
15	PARREÑO, John Kade	L
17	ORDIALES, Leo	OP
19	DOROMAL, Joelbert	OH
18	ARINGO, Leo Jr. (C)	OH
19	DOROMAL, Joelbert	OH
20	BELLO, Joseph Phillip	S
22	DISQUITADO, Jade Alex	OH
23	DIAO, Jenngerard Arnfranz	MB
24	BANDOLA, Mac Arvin	OH
25	GAPULTOS, Jimwell	L
	ALINSUNURIN, Dante Jr.	Coach
	DELA CRUZ, Ariel	Assistant

Perpetual Altas
No.	Player name	Position
1	MATEO, Klint	OP
2	MARAPOC, Jefferson	OH
3	PASCUA, James	OH
4	TEODORO, Paul	L
5	MEDALLA, Micheal	MB
6	ANDARE, KC	MB
7	LLORENTE, Roland	OP
9	CODENIERA, Sean Archer	OP
10	RAMIREZ, Leo	OH
11	ENARCISO, John Christian (C)	S
12	LITUANIA, John Exequel	S
13	GELOGO, Kylle	MB
14	RAMIREZ, Louie	OH
15	ARROZADO, Dexter	OH
16	ROSOS, Kirth	MN
17	CASTIL, John	MB
18	PEPITO, John Philip	L
19	TABUGA, Kobe	OH
	ACAYLAR, Zinfronio	Coach
	CARINO, Michael/ MARCELO, J.	Assistant

San Beda Red Spikers
No.	Player name	Position
3	CALAYAG, Lorenz	MB
4	BOOK, Axel Van	OH
5	BAKIL, Andrei	MB
6	LOPEZ, Jerome	S
7	MUNSING, Grek Alener	MB
9	UMALI, Kenrod	OH
10	CABALSA, Ralhp	OP
11	SANTOS, Justine	MB
13	MONTEMAYOR, Kevin	OP
14	RUS, Aidjien Josh (C)	L
15	BUHAY, Jiacomo Ken	MB
16	TAHILUDDIN, Mohammad Shaif Ali	OH
17	LABRADOR, Jeremy Sean	OH
19	DIAZ, Kurt Lee	MB
20	CAÑAL, Rafael	S
21	MILJANI, Alsenal	OH
22	BALDOS, Jason	S
23	TOLENTINO, Arnel	OP
24	SAROL, Venchie	MB
25	GALLANO, Gerico	L
	DELA CRUZ, Ariel	Coach
	LIRIO, Edward Jan	Assistant

UST Golden Spikers
No.	Player name	Position
1	DE VEGA, Rey Miguel	OH
2	SALVADOR, Kenneth John	OH
3	YAMANAKA, Ryuichi Isaiah	OP
4	TAVERA, Kevin Luis	MB
5	RAMOS, John Vincent	OH
6	DEDOROY, John Emmanuel Jr.	OP
7	YAMBAO, Dux Euan (C)	S
8	BORRA, Lawrence	S
9	AVILA, Joshua	S
10	FLOR, Rainier	MB
11	PRUDENCIADO, Nathaniel	L
13	YBANEZ, Josh	OH
14	VALERA, Trevor	MB
15	UMANDAL, Sherwin	OP
16	COLINARES, Edlyn Paul	MB
17	COLINARES, Ennius Gwen	S
18	PRUDENCIADO, Van Tracy	L
21	CATAP, Neil	OH
22	CAWALING, Kenneth Miles Angelo	MB
23	LARDIZABAL, Patrick John	MB
	MAMON, Odjie	Coach
	MAPE, B./ ESTEBAN, Clarence	Assistant

Legend
S	Setter
MB	Middle Blocker
OH	Outside Hitter
OP	Opposite Hitter
L	Libero
(C)	Team Captain

=== Women's line-up ===
Benilde Lady Blazers
No.	Player name	Position
1	BASARTE, Chenae	S
2	DIZON, Cathrina	MB
3	GAMIT, Michelle	MB
4	ESTENZO Kim Alison	L
5	GETIGAN, Fiona Naomi	L
6	BASILIO, Zen Reina	S
7	GENTAPA, Jade	OH
8	MONDOÑEDO, Cloannie Sophia (C)	S
9	PASCUAL, Jhasmine Gayle	OP
11	BADION, Sophia Margarette	MB
12	APOSTOL, Corrine Allyson	OH
14	ESTOQUE, Wielyn	OH
15	INOCENTES, Fiona Marie	MB
16	CATARIG, Clydel Mae	OP
17	DOROG, Jessa	OH
18	ONDANGAN, Cristy	OP
19	BORROMEO, Mary Grace	OH
20	DENSIG, Rhea Mae	OH
21	NOLASCO, Zamantha	MB
	YEE, Jerry	Coach
	GO, Micah	Assistant

Enderun Lady Titans
No.	Player name	Position
1	DULAY, Jennalyn Michelle	L
2	ALMENDRALEJO, Rhean Hebraica	S
3	PEROLINO, Zenneth Irene	MB
4	AGUILAR, Chreizel	OH
5	CARMONA, Shane	OH
6	BOTOR, Althea Virnyce	OH
7	ALVERO, Aurea Claudette	OP
8	RAMIREZ, Mikaela Antoinette Celina (C)	L
9	SANTOS, Alyssa Ashley	S
11	ALBA, Ederlyn	MB
12	ROJO, Yesha Keith	OH
13	QUIOCHO, Ashanti	OH/OP
15	SADIA, Karla Francheska	OH
16	BARILLA, Stephanie Joice	L
17	DELORIA, Erika Jin	OH
18	MA, Maria Michaella	MB
	DELA CRUZ, Ariel	Coach
	LIM, John Aries	Assistant

FEU Lady Tamaraws
No.	Player name	Position
1	BAKANKE, Faida	OP
2	KISEO, Shiela Mae	L
4	TRUZ, Karyme Isabella	MB
5	UBALDO, Christine	S
6	JUANGCO, Alexandra Maxine	L
7	ASIS, Ann Roselle	MB
8	PANANGIN, Mitzi	MB
9	TAGAOD, Chenie	OH
10	PAPA, Florize Anne	MB
11	GALLO, Gillianne	S
12	PONS, Melody	OP
13	DEVOSORA, Alyssa	OH
14	BEDONIA, Kiesha Dazzie	OH
15	PETALLO, Gerzel Mary	OH
16	ALBERTO, Maria Issabel	S
17	ENCARNACION, Margarett Louise	L
18	MEDINA, Nikka Ann (C)	OP
20	MONARES, Julianne	L
21	ELLARINA, Jazlyn Anne	OH
28	MORALES, Zyra Danica	OP
	REFUGIA, Manolo	Coach
	BARRICA, J./BUNAG, Joan	Assistant

Lyceum Lady Pirates
No.	Player name	Position
1	DE GUZMAN, Joann Faeith	OH
2	GUZMAN, Angelica Blue	L
4	STA. MARIA, Lois	MB
6	TULANG, Janeth	OP
7	RIVAS, Marcela Angela	L
8	LOPEZ, Stacey Denise	OH
9	TOPACIO, Lean Isabelle (C)	OH
10	PUZON, Venice	S
11	GALEDO, Kareina Paula	S
12	DOGUNA, Joan	OH
13	MALAPIT, Gila Mae	MB
14	DAYA, Micah Nina	MB
15	DOLORITO, Johna Denise	OH
16	OSADA, Hiromi	OP
18	PEREZ, Anamae	OH/OP
20	DOMINGO, Cyrille	MB
	GARCIA, Crowwel	Coach
	WANTA, Ciarnelle	Assistant

Mapúa Lady Cardinals
No.	Player name	Position
1	CABADIN, Gregchelle	OH
2	RICABLANCA, Raisa Janel	OH
3	MANALO, Therese Angeli (C)	MB
5	GARCIA, Freighanne	OH
6	REBUSTES, Princess	L
7	BARBIERA, Princess Jolina	MB
8	GOJOL, Trixie	S
9	DELA CRUZ, Roxie	OH
10	ESPIRITU, Ayena Gwen	S
11	ONG, Alyanna Nicole	MB
12	TAMBASACAN, MA. Theresa	OH
14	ESTEBAN, Franchesca Clariss	OP
15	MACATANGAY, Frances Isabel	OH
16	BERCES, Nadine Angeli	OH
17	MANARANG, Princess Jeline	S
18	DE GUZMAN, Hannah	OP
19	DALIDA, Sunshine	OH
20	BASBAS, Vanessa	L
22	MARCOS, Clarence	MB
26	GACULA, Freebie Alejandra	L
	ESTEBAN, Clarence	Coach
	CASTILLO, Mark Fer	Assistant

San Sebastian Lady Stags
No.	Player name	Position
1	SANTOS, Katherine	OH
2	DIONISIO, Kristine Joy	OH
3	PASCO, Lei Lance	OH
4	MARASIGAN, Christina	OH
5	ADIA, Mary Anne Margarette	S
6	LUMIBAO, Jassy Lei	MB
7	DOMINGO, Jasmyn	L
8	MARTINEZ, Brigette Anne	OP
9	LAZARTE, Chloi Florenci	L
10	TAN, Kamille Jospehine Amacka (C)	MB
11	DEPOSOY, Zenith Joy	OH
12	GONZALES, Juna May	MB
13	DIMACULANGAN, Von Aleina	S
	GORAYEB, Rogelio	Coach
	MALAZO, Clint	Assistant

Perpetual Lady Altas
No.	Player name	Position
1	DAPOL, Mary Rhose	OH
2	UY, Daizerlyn Joice	MB
3	BEDANA, Winnie	MB
4	OMIPON, Shaila Allaine	OH
5	BUSTAMANTE, Camille	OH
6	ARIOLA, Frannie Istle	S
7	GAA, Nicollete Anne	S
8	DONIG, Jillaiza Mika	OH
9	OCADO, Charmaine Mae	OH
10	CORDERO, Krisha	OH/OP
11	MARIANO, Monica Louise	OH
12	ANDAL, Marian Tracy	L
14	ENRICO, Charisse Mae	MB
15	ALDEA, Razel Paula (C)	MB
16	SAPIN, Jhasmine	S
17	LOZANO, Joanna Denise	L
	RIETA, Sandy	Coach
	SAPIN, Jason	Assistant

UE Lady Warriors
No.	Player name	Position
1	QUIZON, Jhudielle	S
2	LANA, Janeca Janine	OH
3	ECALLA, Mary Christine	OP
4	VILLAMOR, Dea Pauline	L
5	PELAGA, Lia Alexa	MB
6	CASTILLO, Claire Angela	OH
7	GAJERO, Jelaica Faye	OP
9	DONGALO, Casiey Monique	OH
10	FERNANDEZ, Shamel Gracen	L
11	FAMULAGAN, Keshia Marie	MB
12	MADRIAGA, Kizzie (C)	S
13	BALINGIT, Kayce	OH
14	CAÑETE, Ashley	OP
15	NIEVA, Percae Darabella	OP
16	ZETA, Jenina Marie	L
17	CEPADA, KC	OH
18	TEQUIN, Shainely	S
19	NOGALES, Riza	MB
20	REYES, Angelica	L
	YEE, Jerry	Coach
	VITAL, Obet/CHOLICO, S.	Assistant

== Men's tournament ==
=== Preliminary round ===
==== Ranking ====
Pos	Team	Pld	W	L	Pts	SW	SL	SR	SPW	SPL	SPR	Qualification
1	UST Golden Spikers	7	6	1	18	19	6	3.167	607	533	1.139	Semifinals
2	Ateneo Blue Eagles	7	6	1	17	19	7	2.714	610	540	1.130	Semifinals
3	De La Salle Green Spikers	7	4	3	14	16	11	1.455	610	581	1.050	Semifinals
4	FEU Tamaraws	7	4	3	12	15	13	1.154	631	606	1.041	Semifinals
5	NU Bulldogs	7	4	3	11	14	12	1.167	586	575	1.019	
6	Perpetual Altas	7	3	4	9	11	13	0.846	528	550	0.960	
7	EAC Generals	7	1	6	2	5	20	0.250	519	606	0.856	
8	San Beda Red Spikers	7	0	7	1	4	21	0.190	487	587	0.830	

==== Match results ====
- All times are Philippine Standard Time (UTC+8:00).

Date	Time		Score		Set 1	Set 2	Set 3	Set 4	Set 5	Total	Report
16 Aug	10:00	EAC Generals	0–3	Perpetual Altas	27–29	24–26	19–25			70–80	P–2
16 Aug	12:00	FEU Tamaraws	0–3	NU Bulldogs	22–25	22–25	19–25			63–75	P–2
18 Aug	10:00	De La Salle Green Spikers	3–1	UST Golden Spikers	26–28	25–18	28–26	25–21		104–93	P–2
18 Aug	12:00	Perpetual Altas	3–0	San Beda Red Spikers	25–14	25–17	25–22			75–53	P–2
20 Aug	10:00	FEU Tamaraws	3–2	De La Salle Green Spikers	25–22	20–25	25–23	16–25	17–15	103–110	P–2
20 Aug	12:00	Ateneo Blue Eagles	3–1	EAC Generals	23–25	25–22	25–19	25–16		98–82	P–2
23 Aug	14:00	San Beda Red Spikers	0–3	Ateneo Blue Eagles	18–25	17–25	21–25			56–75	P–2
23 Aug	16:00	UST Golden Spikers	3–1	NU Bulldogs	25–22	25–16	18–25	28–26		96–89	
25 Aug	14:00	Perpetual Altas	0–3	UST Golden Spikers	19–25	19–25	15–25			53–75	P–3
25 Aug	16:00	NU Bulldogs	3–1	EAC Generals	25–14	29–27	22–25	25–23		101–89	P–3
27 Aug	14:00	Ateneo Blue Eagles	3–2	FEU Tamaraws	25–22	25–23	18–25	23–25	15–13	106–108	P–3
27 Aug	16:00	De La Salle Green Spikers	3–1	San Beda Red Spikers	25–15	25–22	16–25	25–21		91–83	P–3
30 Aug	10:00	FEU Tamaraws	3–1	Perpetual Altas	25–22	23–25	25–16	25–16		98–79	P–3
30 Aug	12:00	EAC Generals	0–3	UST Golden Spikers	18–25	19–25	19–25			56–75	P–3
03 Sep	10:00	EAC Generals	3–2	San Beda Red Spikers	14–25	22–25	25–23	25–17	15–11	101–101	P–2
03 Sep	12:00	UST Golden Spikers	3–1	FEU Tamaraws	25–22	26–24	20–25	25–18		96–89	P–2
06 Sep	14:00	De La Salle Green Spikers	2–3	NU Bulldogs	25–19	25–23	15–25	22–25	11–15	98–107	P–2
06 Sep	16:00	Perpetual Altas	1–3	Ateneo Blue Eagles	18–25	25–21	21–25	21–25		85–96	P–2
08 Sep	14:00	EAC Generals	0–3	De La Salle Green Spikers	19–25	24–26	18–25			61–76	P–2
08 Sep	16:00	FEU Tamaraws	3–1	San Beda Red Spikers	25–19	25–21	20–25	25–15		95–80	P–2
10 Sep	14:00	NU Bulldogs	1–3	Perpetual Altas	20–25	25–23	17–25	21–25		83–98	P–2
10 Sep	16:00	Ateneo Blue Eagles	1–3	UST Golden Spikers	20–25	23–25	25–22	15–25		83–97	P–2
13 Sep	10:00	EAC Generals	0–3	FEU Tamaraws	21–25	18–25	21–25			60–75	P–2
13 Sep	12:00	NU Bulldogs	0–3	Ateneo Blue Eagles	23–25	24–26	9–25			56–76	P–2
15 Sep	10:00	UST Golden Spikers	3–0	San Beda Red Spikers	25–19	25–17	25–23			75–59	P–2
15 Sep	12:00	Perpetual Altas	0–3	De La Salle Green Spikers	20–25	19–25	19–25			58–75	P–2
17 Sep	14:00	San Beda Red Spikers	0–3	NU Bulldogs	20–25	19–25	16–25			55–75	P–2
17 Sep	16:00	Ateneo Blue Eagles	3–0	De La Salle Green Spikers	25–17	26–24	25–15			76–56	P–2

=== Final round ===
- All times are Philippine Standard Time (UTC+8:00).
- Battle for bronze is a knockout match.
- Championship is a best-of-three series.

Semifinals
1	UST Golden Spikers	3	3
4	FEU Tamaraws	1	1
2	Ateneo Blue Eagles	3	0	0
3	De La Salle Green Spikers	2	3	3

Championship
UST Golden Spikers	2	1
De La Salle Green Spikers	3	3
Third place
Ateneo Blue Eagles	1
FEU Tamaraws	3

==== Semifinals ====
Rank 1 vs Rank 4

Date	Time		Score		Set 1	Set 2	Set 3	Set 4	Set 5	Total	Report
20 Sep	16:00	UST Golden Spikers	3–1	FEU Tamaraws	21–25	25–21	25–22	25–22		96–90	P–2
22 Sep	14:00	FEU Tamaraws	1–3	UST Golden Spikers	19–25	22–25	25–23	23–25		89–98	P–2

Rank 2 vs Rank 3

Date	Time		Score		Set 1	Set 2	Set 3	Set 4	Set 5	Total	Report
20 Sep	14:00	Ateneo Blue Eagles	3–2	De La Salle Green Spikers	25–23	21–25	25–22	14–25	15–11	100–106	P–2
22 Sep	16:00	De La Salle Green Spikers	3–0	Ateneo Blue Eagles	25–21	25–21	25–21			75–63	P–2
24 Sep	16:00	Ateneo Blue Eagles	0–3	De La Salle Green Spikers	17–25	15–25	19–25			51–75	P–2

==== 3rd place match ====
Date	Time		Score		Set 1	Set 2	Set 3	Set 4	Set 5	Total	Report
27 Sep	10:00	Ateneo Blue Eagles	1–3	FEU Tamaraws	23–25	25–21	26–28	21–25		95–99	P–3

==== Championship ====
Date	Time		Score		Set 1	Set 2	Set 3	Set 4	Set 5	Total	Report
27 Sep	16:00	UST Golden Spikers	2–3	De La Salle Green Spikers	21–25	25–16	21–25	25–22	8–15	100–103	P–2
29 Sep	16:00	De La Salle Green Spikers	3–1	UST Golden Spikers	25–22	27–29	29–27	25–18		106–96	P–2

2023 V-League Collegiate Challenge Men's Champions
De La Salle Green Spikers
1st title

== Women's tournament ==
=== Preliminary round ===
==== Ranking ====
Pos	Team	Pld	W	L	Pts	SW	SL	SR	SPW	SPL	SPR	Qualification
1	FEU Lady Tamaraws	7	7	0	21	21	4	5.250	606	454	1.335	Semifinals
2	Benilde Lady Blazers	7	6	1	17	19	6	3.167	599	492	1.217	Semifinals
3	UE Lady Warriors	7	5	2	14	17	9	1.889	611	531	1.151	Semifinals
4	Perpetual Lady Altas	7	4	3	12	15	13	1.154	631	622	1.014	Semifinals
5	Enderun Lady Titans	7	2	5	7	11	17	0.647	548	635	0.863	
6	Lyceum Lady Pirates	7	2	5	6	11	19	0.579	611	681	0.897	
7	Mapúa Lady Cardinals	7	2	5	5	8	17	0.471	525	588	0.893	
8	San Sebastian Lady Stags	7	0	7	2	4	21	0.190	466	594	0.785	

==== Match results ====
- All times are Philippine Standard Time (UTC+8:00).

Date	Time		Score		Set 1	Set 2	Set 3	Set 4	Set 5	Total	Report
16 Aug	14:00	Enderun Lady Titans	0–3	UE Lady Warriors	16–25	16–25	20–25			52–75	P–2
16 Aug	16:00	Mapúa Lady Cardinals	0–3	FEU Lady Tamaraws	13–25	18–25	15–25			46–75	P–2
18 Aug	14:00	Benilde Lady Blazers	3–0	Lyceum Lady Pirates	25–19	25–20	25–13			75–52	P–2
18 Aug	16:00	Perpetual Lady Altas	3–0	San Sebastian Lady Stags	25–18	25–19	25–19			75–56	P–2
20 Aug	14:00	Mapúa Lady Cardinals	3–2	Lyceum Lady Pirates	23–25	25–19	25–23	22–25	15–11	110–103	P–2
20 Aug	16:00	San Sebastian Lady Stags	2–3	Enderun Lady Titans	25–21	25–21	16–25	23–25	12–15	101–107	P–2
23 Aug	10:00	Perpetual Lady Altas	1–3	FEU Lady Tamaraws	26–28	25–17	17–25	13–25		81–95	P–2
23 Aug	12:00	UE Lady Warriors	3–1	Mapúa Lady Cardinals	25–17	25–18	21–25	25–16		96–76	P–2
25 Aug	10:00	FEU Lady Tamaraws	3–0	Enderun Lady Titans	25–11	25–10	25–16			75–37	P–2
25 Aug	12:00	UE Lady Warriors	3–0	San Sebastian Lady Stags	25–14	25–19	25–14			75–47	P–2
27 Aug	10:00	San Sebastian Lady Stags	0–3	Benilde Lady Blazers	14–25	15–25	18–25			47–75	P–2
27 Aug	12:00	Lyceum Lady Pirates	2–3	Perpetual Lady Altas	25–20	23–25	20–25	25–20	9–15	102–105	P–2
30 Aug	14:00	UE Lady Warriors	3–2	Perpetual Lady Altas	25–21	24–26	24–26	25–22	15–12	113–107	P–2
30 Aug	16:00	FEU Lady Tamaraws	3–1	Lyceum Lady Pirates	25–17	25–16	23–25	25–19		98–77	P–2
03 Sep	14:00	San Sebastian Lady Stags	0–3	FEU Lady Tamaraws	12–25	18–25	12–25			42–75	P–2
03 Sep	16:00	Lyceum Lady Pirates	0–3	UE Lady Warriors	15–25	15–25	23–25			53–75	P–2
06 Sep	10:00	Benilde Lady Blazers	3–0	Mapúa Lady Cardinals	25–16	25–22	25–20			75–58	P–2
06 Sep	12:00	Perpetual Lady Altas	3–1	Enderun Lady Titans	25–27	25–14	25–22	25–19		100–82	P–2
08 Sep	10:00	Enderun Lady Titans	2–3	Lyceum Lady Pirates	25–22	20–25	19–25	26–24	14–16	104–112	P–2
08 Sep	12:00	FEU Lady Tamaraws	3–1	Benilde Lady Blazers	25–23	19–25	25–16	25–22		94–86	P–2
10 Sep	10:00	Benilde Lady Blazers	3–1	UE Lady Warriors	23–25	25–22	29–27	25–18		102–92	P–2
10 Sep	12:00	Mapúa Lady Cardinals	1–3	Perpetual Lady Altas	25–16	18–25	18–25	37–39		98–105	P–2
13 Sep	14:00	UE Lady Warriors	1–3	FEU Lady Tamaraws	25–16	26–28	13–25	21–25		85–94	P–2
13 Sep	16:00	Enderun Lady Titans	3–0	Mapúa Lady Cardinals	25–23	25–21	25–18			75–62	P–2
15 Sep	14:00	Perpetual Lady Altas	0–3	Benilde Lady Blazers	18–25	24–26	16–25			58–76	P–2
15 Sep	16:00	Lyceum Lady Pirates	3–2	San Sebastian Lady Stags	17–25	22–25	25–22	25–21	23–21	112–114	P–2
17 Sep	10:00	Mapúa Lady Cardinals	3–0	San Sebastian Lady Stags	25–15	25–22	25–22			75–59	P–2
17 Sep	12:00	Enderun Lady Titans	2–3	Benilde Lady Blazers	17–25	25–20	10–25	27–25	12–15	91–110	P–2

=== Final round ===
- All times are Philippine Standard Time (UTC+08:00).
- Battle for bronze is a knockout match.
- Championship is a best-of-three series.

Semifinals
1	FEU Lady Tamaraws	0	3	3
4	Perpetual Lady Altas	3	1	0
2	Benilde Lady Blazers	3	3
3	UE Lady Warriors	0	0

Championship
FEU Lady Tamaraws	0	0
Benilde Lady Blazers	3	3
Third place
UE Lady Warriors	3
Perpetual Lady Altas	0

==== Semifinals ====
Rank 1 vs Rank 4

Date	Time		Score		Set 1	Set 2	Set 3	Set 4	Set 5	Total	Report
20 Sep	12:00	FEU Lady Tamaraws	0–3	Perpetual Lady Altas	21–25	26–28	24–26			71–79	P–2
22 Sep	10:00	Perpetual Lady Altas	1–3	FEU Lady Tamaraws	25–23	23–25	17–25	13–25		78–98	P–2
24 Sep	14:00	FEU Lady Tamaraws	3–0	Perpetual Lady Altas	25–16	25–20	25–17			75–53	P–2

Rank 2 vs Rank 3

Date	Time		Score		Set 1	Set 2	Set 3	Set 4	Set 5	Total	Report
20 Sep	10:00	Benilde Lady Blazers	3–0	UE Lady Warriors	25–22	25–13	25–12			75–47	P–2
22 Sep	14:00	UE Lady Warriors	0–3	Benilde Lady Blazers	21–25	13–25	10–25			44–75	P–2

==== Third place match ====
Date	Time		Score		Set 1	Set 2	Set 3	Set 4	Set 5	Total	Report
27 Sep	12:00	UE Lady Warriors	3–0	Perpetual Lady Altas	28–26	25–23	25–23			78–72	P–2

==== Championship ====
Date	Time		Score		Set 1	Set 2	Set 3	Set 4	Set 5	Total	Report
27 Sep	14:00	FEU Lady Tamaraws	0–3	Benilde Lady Blazers	18–25	18–25	16–25			52–75	P–2
29 Sep	14:00	Benilde Lady Blazers	3–0	FEU Lady Tamaraws	25–18	25–19	25–18			75–55	P–2

2023 V-League Collegiate Challenge Women's Champions
Benilde Lady Blazers
1st title

== Awards and medalists ==
=== Individual awards ===
Award	Men's	Women's	Ref.
Conference Most Valuable Player	Josh Ybañez	Mary Rhose Dapol	
Finals Most Valuable Player	Noel Michael Kampton	Jhasmine Gayle Pascual	
Best Setter	Diogenes Poquita III	Christine Ubaldo	
1st Best Outside Spiker	Noel Michael Kampton	Jade Gentapa	
2nd Best Outside Spiker	Rey Miguel De Vega	Kiesha Dazzie Bedonia	
1st Best Middle Blocker	Lirick Mendoza	Zamantha Nolasco	
2nd Best Middle Blocker	Rainier Flor	Riza Nogales	
Best Opposite Spiker	John Mark Ronquillo	Jhasmine Gayle Pascual	
Best Libero	Menard Guerrero	Marian Tracy Andal	

=== Medalists ===
Division	Gold	Silver	Bronze
Men's	De La Salle Green Spikers RONQUILLO, John Mark (c); JAVIER, Joaquin Antonio; MENDOZA, Uriel; MARATA, Von; GUERRERO, Menard; POQUITA, Diogenes III; KAMPTON, Noel Michael; ESPEJO, Andre; GLORIA, Eugene; ENCARNARCION, Simon Joseph; DEL PILAR, Nathanie; LAYUG, Eric Paolo; MAGLINAO, Vince Gerard; DE JESUS, Jules Carlo; VENTURA, Glen Rui; RODRIGUEZ, Joshua Jamiel Head Coach: Arnold Laniog	UST Golden Spikers YAMBAO, Dux Euan (c); DE VEGA, Rey Miguel; SALVADOR, Kenneth John; YAMANAKA, Ryuichi Isaiah; TAVERA, Kevin Luis; RAMOS, John Vincent; DEDOROY, John Emmanuel Jr. BORRA, Lawrence; AVILA, Joshua; FLOR, Rainier; PRUDENCIADO, Nathaniel; YBANEZ, Josh; VALERA, Trevor; UMANDAL, Sherwin; COLINARES, Edlyn Paul; COLINARES, Ennius Gwen; PRUDENCIADO, Van Tracy; CATAP, Neil; CAWALING, Kenneth Miles Angelo; LARDIZABAL, Patrick John Head Coach: Odjie Mamon	FEU Tamaraws MARTINEZ, Benny (c); CODILLA, Jomel; CACAO, Ariel; DE GUZMAN, Bryce; TALISAYAN, Jerold; SABANAL, Reymond; SAAVEDRA, Zhydryx; MENZOZA, Lirick; GARRIEDO, Judi; CEJALES, Jacob; BUGAOAN, Martin; DELICANA, Andrei; ABUNIAWAN, Jefferson; ADECIR, Glen Head Coach: Eddieson Orcullo
Women's	Benilde Lady Blazers MONDOÑEDO, Cloannie Sophia (c); BASARTE, Chenae; DIZON, Cathrina; GAMIT, Michelle; ESTENZO Kim Alison; GETIGAN, Fiona Naomi; BASILIO, Zen Reina; GENTAPA, Jade; PASCUAL, Jhasmine Gayle; BADION, Sophia Margarette; APOSTOL, Corrine Allyson; ESTOQUE, Wielyn; INOCENTES, Fiona Marie; CATARIG, Clydel Mae; DOROG, Jessa; ONDANGAN, Cristy; BORROMEO, Mary Grace; DENSIG, Rhea Mae; NOLASCO, Zamantha Head Coach: Jerry Yee	FEU Lady Tamaraws MEDINA, Nikka Ann (c); BAKANKE, Faida; KISEO, Shiela Mae; TRUZ, Karyme Isabella; UBALDO, Christine; JUANGCO, Alexandra Maxine; ASIS, Ann Roselle; PANANGIN, Mitzi; TAGAOD, Chenie; PAPA, Florize Anne; GALLO, Gillianne; PONS, Melody; DEVOSORA, Alyssa; BEDONIA, Kiesha Dazzie; PETALLO, Gerzel Mary; ALBERTO, Maria Issabel; ENCARNACION, Margarett Louise; MONARES, Julianne; ELLARINA, Jazlyn Anne; MORALES, Zyra Danica Head Coach: Manolo Refugia	UE Lady Warriors; MADRIAGA, Kizzie (c) QUIZON, Jhudielle; LANA, Janeca Janine; ECALLA, Mary Cristine; VILLAMOR, Dea Pauline; PELAGA, Lea Alexa; CASTILLO, Claire Angela; GAJERO, Jelaica Faye; DONGALO, Casiey Monique; FERNANDEZ, Shamel Gracen; FAMULAGAN, Keshia Marie; BALINGIT, Kayce; CAÑETE, Ashley; NIEVA, Percae Darabella; ZETA, Jenina Marie; CEPADA, KC; TEQUIN, Shainely; NOGALES, Riza; REYES, Angelica Head Coach: Jerry Yee

== Final standings ==
Rank	Men's	Women's
1st place, gold medalist(s)	De La Salle Green Spikers	Benilde Lady Blazers
2nd place, silver medalist(s)	UST Golden Spikers	FEU Lady Tamaraws
3rd place, bronze medalist(s)	FEU Tamaraws	UE Lady Warriors
4	Ateneo Blue Eagles	Perpetual Lady Altas
5	NU Bulldogs	Enderun Lady Titans
6	Perpetual Altas	Lyceum Lady Pirates
7	EAC Generals	Mapúa Lady Cardinals
8	San Beda Red Spikers	San Sebastian Lady Stags

== See also ==
- 2023 Shakey's Super League National Invitationals
- 2023 Shakey's Super League Collegiate Pre-Season Championship
