= NCAA Season 94 volleyball tournaments =

NCAA Season 94
- Host school: University of Perpetual Help System DALTA
Men's Finals	G1	G2	Wins
Perpetual Altas	3	3	2
Benilde Blazers	2	1	0
- Duration: Feb. 1–8, 2019
- Arena(s): Filoil Flying V Arena
- Finals MVP: Joebert Almodiel
- Winning coach: Sinfronio "Sammy" Acaylar
- Semifinalists: Arellano Chiefs; EAC Generals
- TV network(s): ABS-CBN Sports and Action
Women's Finals	G1	G2	G3	Wins
Perpetual Lady Altas	3	2	1	1
Arellano Lady Chiefs	1	3	3	2
- Duration: Feb. 1–12, 2019
- Arena(s): Filoil Flying V Arena
- Finals MVP: Regine Arocha
- Winning coach: Roberto Öbet" Javier
- Semifinalists: Benilde Lady Blazers; San Beda Red Lionesses
- TV network(s): ABS-CBN Sports and Action
Juniors' Finals	G1	G2	Wins
Perpetual Junior Altas	3	3	2
Letran Squires	0	0	0
- Duration: Feb. 1–8, 2019
- Arena(s): Filoil Flying V Arena
- Finals MVP: Hero Austria
- Winning coach: Sandy Rieta
- Semifinalists: EAC–ICA Brigadiers; Lyceum Junior Pirates

The NCAA Season 94 volleyball tournaments started on November 23, 2018 at the Filoil Flying V Centre in San Juan, Philippines.

All teams will participate in an elimination round which is a single round robin tournament. The top four teams qualify in the semifinals, where the unbeaten team bounces through the finals, with a thrice-to-beat advantage, higher-seeded team possesses the twice-to-beat advantage, or qualify to the first round. The winners qualify to the finals.

== Men's tournament ==
=== Team line-up ===
Arellano Chiefs
No.	Name	Position
1	ENCILA, Ian	OH
2	CABILLAN, Jethro Jesper	S
3	LAPUZ, Demy Freedom	OP
5	MENESES, Edmark	MB
6	VILLADOS, Adrian	OH
7	ARELLANO, Tonell	L
9	SEGOVIA, Christian Joshua	MB
10	ESGUERRA, Joshua	L
11	CASUCO, Kean Andredson	S
13	TAN Kim, Vincent	OP
14	CUCAM, Junel	OH
15	DELA PAZ, Christian	MB
17	LIBERATO, Jerael	OH
19	MANALANSAN, Timoti Jhon	OP
	MENESES, Sherwin	HC

Letran Knights
No.	Name	Position
1	TONGIO, Andrei Smart	OH
2	TABBADA, Jay Paul	OP
3	BRIOSO, Vincent Philip	L
4	CISTINA, Christopher	MB
5	CANZANA, Angel Romdel	OP
6	FRANCISCO, Aareon John	MB
7	DORIA, Michael Christian	OH
8	LOZANO, Joshua	OP
9	ERA, Denver Domnic	OH
10	NICOLAS, Byron	S
11	GABUYO, Mhel	MB
12	REAL, Jhomar	L
14	SISON, Zecharia Jan	OH
15	CAPACETE, John Erivin	S
	ESQUIBEL, Brian	HC

Benilde Blazers
No.	Name	Position
1	MAGSINO, Kevin	OP
2	ADVIENTO, Roniey	MB
4	UGALDE, Renald Ian	OH
5	DACULAN, Ryan	S
6	BAUTISTA, Anthony	MB
7	BACANI, Owen	OP
8	ALMONTE, Franz Emille	OH
9	DY, Ajlan Paul	L
10	GAUANI, George	S
11	ABROT, Ruvince	OP
13	DUMARAN, Bryan	L
14	BASILIAN, Francis Leo	MB
15	SAN MIGUEL, Jericho	OH
19	DE SEQUERA, Joshua Raphael	OP
	LANIOG, Arnold	HC

EAC Generals
No.	Name	Position
1	PANOY, Owen John	OH
3	RAMILO, Joshua	MB
4	JULAO, Mark Louie	OP
5	MINA, Joshua	S
6	CASTILLO, John Vincent	OH
7	DAYUYA Aeron	OP
8	DIONES, Bhie Lawrence	S
9	LASALA, Hredez Yean	L
10	MAGADAN, Eral Joshua	L
11	PIOGO, Ralph Joshua	OP
12	BAUTISTA, Mark Chester	OH
13	BEAGA, Enco	MB
14	MELAD, Danrich	OH
19	CO CHIONG, Selwyn	OP
	PALMERO, Rodrigo	HC

JRU Heavy Bombers
No.	Name	Position
1	CRUZ, Angelo	OP
2	SALAZAR, Hernan	OH
3	AUSINA, Arjay	L
4	RABAJA, Patrick Pierre	MB
5	LEGASPI, Ronald	S
6	SORIANO, Dan Albert	OH
7	LAHAYLAHAY, Wenjo Froy	MB
8	PULONGBARIT, Roden	OP
9	MIGUEL, Matthew	OH
10	DEFENSOR, Melvyn	L
11	CEBRERO, Wilbert	S
12	SULIVAS, Patrick John	MB
15	LAXINA, June	OH
16	ESTACIO, Miguel	OP
	DELA PAZ, Ryan Joseph	HC

Lyceum Pirates
No.	Name	Position
1	TIBAYAN, Kier Andrei	MB
2	LAJARAW, Joshua	OH
3	UY CORRAL, Siegfred	L
5	LEONIDA, Robert	S
6	GALANG, Jan Michael	MB
7	GOLLOSSO, Vergel	OP
8	PORTO, Jerie Keiyan	OH
9	COLONIA, Juvic	S
11	MORAL, Kian Carlo	L
12	BIÑAS, Miko	OP
13	DEL RIO, Charles Eugene	OH
14	SAPORNA, Sinmart	MB
15	NEGRITO, Jerome	OH
16	LEGASPI, Jhomelle Luiz	OP
	LONTOC, Emil	HC

Mapúa Cardinals
No.	Name	Position
1	ANDAYA, Rey Arth	S
2	EGAN, Mark Jason	OH
3	MAGLINTE, Neli	MB
4	KIAMCO, Ace Gabriel	OH
5	VARGAS, Cal Vin Karlo	OP
6	BASAS, Anthony	MB
7	SARCOL, Kent Joshua	L
8	NAVAS, Angelbert	OP
9	PULGA, Miguel Jr	OH
11	PAGULONG, Alfredo	S
12	LUMA-AD, II Pipo	MB
13	ABELLADA, Beneth Jan	L
15	HIZON, Raje Emmanuel	OH
18	TABIOS, Karl	OP
	DOLOIRAS, Paul John	HC

San Beda Red Lions
No.	Name	Position
2	MUALLIL, Edzlin	MB
3	TORRES, Angelo Michael	OH
5	DAQULI, Johnray	MB
6	LAPURGA, Melver	S
7	AMAGAN, Jomaru	OP
9	ULIBAS JR, Ferdinand	OH
10	ESTAVILLO, John Lester	MB
11	TIBAY, Jeremiah	L
12	PALATTAO, Patrick	OP
13	LOSA, Jeffrey	S
14	NURSIDDIK, Abdurasad	MB
15	MAGANA, Jayvie	OH
16	ROJAS, Bruce	OP
19	DECANO, Mark Joel	L
	PAMILAR, Ernesto	HC

San Sebastian Stags
No.	Name	Position
1	SANCHEZ, Kince	OP
2	ANDRADE, Jerome	L
3	LANA, Julius James	OH
5	TEODONES, Romeo	MB
6	ABULENCIA, Angelo	S
7	MENDOZA, Milkel Rovin	OH
8	DE GUZMAN, Mel Clarence	OP
9	EÑANO, John Anel	L
10	RAMIREZ, Christian	MB
11	LAZARO, Elino Elmer	OH
12	EUSEBIO Timothy John	S
13	BUNSUAN, Nathalian	MB
15	EUGEBIO, James Christian	OP
16	PAMITTAN, Robbie	OH
	CHUA, Rudy	HC

Perpetual Altas
No.	Name	Position
9		
10		
11		
12		
13		MB
14	BALMORES, Gilbert	L
16	ALMODIEL, Joebert	OH
	ACAYLAR, Sinfronio	HC

=== Elimination round ===
==== Team standings ====
Pos	Team	Pld	W	L	Pts	SW	SL	SR	SPW	SPL	SPR	Qualification
1	Perpetual Altas (H)	9	9	0	27	27	2	13.500	725	558	1.299	Finals
2	Benilde Blazers	9	8	1	24	25	5	5.000	729	597	1.221	Semifinals
3	Arellano Chiefs	9	7	2	20	22	10	2.200	736	640	1.150	First round playoff
4	EAC Generals	9	6	3	17	21	13	1.615	751	724	1.037	First round playoff
5	San Sebastian Stags	9	4	5	12	14	19	0.737	722	749	0.964	
6	Letran Knights	9	3	6	9	12	21	0.571	660	745	0.886	
7	Lyceum Pirates	9	3	6	8	12	20	0.600	693	732	0.947	
8	JRU Heavy Bombers	9	2	7	8	11	23	0.478	727	803	0.905	
9	San Beda Red Lions	9	2	7	6	10	23	0.435	729	782	0.932	
10	Mapúa Cardinals	9	2	7	5	9	25	0.360	660	779	0.847	

Rules for classification: Point system: 3 points = win match in 3 or 4 sets; 2 points = win match in 5 sets; 1 point = lose match in 5 sets; 0 point = lose match in 3 or 4 sets
(H) Host

==== Match-up results ====
Team ╲ Game	1	2	3	4	5	6	7	8	9
Arellano	JRU school colors	CSB school colors	Mapua school colors	SSC-R school colors	Lyceum school colors	Letran school colors	EAC school colors	UPHD school colors	San Beda school colors
Benilde	Arellano school colors	Letran school colors	UPHD school colors	EAC school colors	San Beda school colors	Lyceum school colors	JRU school colors	SSC-R school colors	Mapua school colors
Letran	EAC school colors	CSB school colors	JRU school colors	SSC-R school colors	UPHD school colors	Arellano school colors	San Beda school colors	Mapua school colors	Lyceum school colors
EAC	Letran school colors	UPHD school colors	San Beda school colors	CSB school colors	SSC-R school colors	JRU school colors	Mapua school colors	Arellano school colors	Lyceum school colors
JRU	Arellano school colors	Lyceum school colors	Letran school colors	Mapua school colors	San Beda school colors	EAC school colors	SSC-R school colors	CSB school colors	UPHD school colors
Lyceum	SSC-R school colors	JRU school colors	San Beda school colors	UPHD school colors	Arellano school colors	Mapua school colors	CSB school colors	EAC school colors	Letran school colors
Mapúa	San Beda school colors	SSC-R school colors	Arellano school colors	JRU school colors	Lyceum school colors	EAC school colors	UPHD school colors	Letran school colors	CSB school colors
San Beda	UPHD school colors	Mapua school colors	Lyceum school colors	EAC school colors	JRU school colors	CSB school colors	Letran school colors	SSC-R school colors	Arellano school colors
San Sebastian	Lyceum school colors	Mapua school colors	Arellano school colors	Letran school colors	EAC school colors	JRU school colors	San Beda school colors	CSB school colors	UPHD school colors
Perpetual	San Beda school colors	EAC school colors	CSB school colors	Lyceum school colors	Letran school colors	Mapua school colors	Arellano school colors	SSC-R school colors	JRU school colors

= Win; = Loss

==== Game results ====
Team	AU	CSJL	CSB	EAC	JRU	LPU	MU	SBU	SSC-R	UPHSD
AU		3–0	0–3	3–2	3–0	3–0	3–1	3–1	3–0	1–3
CSJL			0–3	2–3	3–2	3–1	3–0	0–3	1–3	0–3
CSB				3–1	3–1	3–0	3–0	3–0	3–0	1–3
EAC					3–0	2–3	3–0	3–0	3–0	0–3
JRU						3–1	2–3	3–1	0–3	0–3
LPU							3–0	3–0	1–3	0–3
MU								2–3	3–2	0–3
SBU									2–3	0–3
SSC-R										0–3

Legend: Blue = left column team win; Red = top row team win.

=== Playoffs ===
First round (One-game playoff)
3	Arellano	2
4	EAC	3

Semifinals (No. 2 seed has twice-to-beat advantage)
2	Benilde	3
4	EAC	0

Finals (Best-of-three series)
1	Perpetual	3	3
2	Benilde	2	1

==== First round ====
Arellano vs EAC One game playoff.

January 22, 2019; 12:00 (UTC +8:00)	Arellano Chiefs	2–3	EAC Generals	Filoil Flying V Arena, San Juan City
January 22, 2019; 12:00 (UTC +8:00)	(26–24, 25–8, 20–25, 18–25, 19–21)			Filoil Flying V Arena, San Juan City

==== Semifinals ====
CSB vs EAC CSB with twice-to-beat advantage.

January 29, 2019; 13:00 (UTC +8:00)	Benilde Blazers	3–0	EAC Generals	Filoil Flying V Arena, San Juan City
January 29, 2019; 13:00 (UTC +8:00)	(25–18, 25–23, 25–20)			Filoil Flying V Arena, San Juan City

==== Finals ====
Perpetual vs Benilde Best of three series.

February 1, 2019; 14:00 (UTC +8:00)	Perpetual Altas	3–2	Benilde Blazers	Filoil Flying V Arena, San Juan City
February 1, 2019; 14:00 (UTC +8:00)	(23–25, 25–20, 23–25, 25–23, 15–12)			Filoil Flying V Arena, San Juan City

February 8, 2019; 12:00 (UTC +8:00)	Benilde Blazers	1–3	Perpetual Altas	Filoil Flying V Arena, San Juan City
February 8, 2019; 12:00 (UTC +8:00)	(25–23, 17–25, 17–25, 23–25)			Filoil Flying V Arena, San Juan City

- Finals' Most Valuable Player: Joebert Almodiel

=== Awards ===
- Most Valuable Player: Joebert Almodiel ( University of Perpetual Help System DALTA)
- Rookie of the Year: Ruvince Abrot ( De La Salle–College of Saint Benilde)
- 1st Best Outside Spiker: Joebert Almodiel ( University of Perpetual Help System DALTA)
- 2nd Best Outside Spiker: Joshua Mina ( Emilio Aguinaldo College)
- 1st Best Middle Blocker: Ronniel Rosales ( University of Perpetual Help System DALTA)
- 2nd Best Middle Blocker: Francis Basilan ( De La Salle–College of Saint Benilde)
- Best Opposite Spiker: Jesrael Liberato ( Arellano University)
- Best Setter: Kevin Magsino ( De La Salle–College of Saint Benilde)
- Best Libero: Joshua Magadan ( Emilio Aguinaldo College)

== Women's tournament ==
=== Team line-up ===
Arellano Lady Chiefs
No.	Name	Position
	JAVIER, Roberto	HC

Letran Lady Knights
No.	Name	Position
	INOFERIO, Michael	HC

Benilde Lady Blazers
No.	Name	Position
	YEE, Jerry	HC

EAC Lady Generals
No.	Name	Position
	PALMERO, Rodrigo	HC

JRU Lady Bombers
No.	Name	Position
	TIOSECO, Mia	HC

Lyceum Lady Pirates
No.	Name	Position
	LONTOC, Emil	HC

Mapúa Lady Cardinals
No.	Name	Position
		HC

San Beda Red Lionesses
No.	Name	Position
		HC

San Sebastian Lady Stags
No.	Name	Position
		HC

Perpetual Lady Altas
No.	Name	Position
		HC

=== Elimination round ===
==== Team standings ====
Pos	Team	Pld	W	L	Pts	SW	SL	SR	SPW	SPL	SPR	Qualification
1	Benilde Lady Blazers	9	8	1	25	26	7	3.714	782	641	1.220	Semifinals with a twice-to-beat advantage
2	Arellano Lady Chiefs	9	8	1	24	26	6	4.333	748	565	1.324	Semifinals with a twice-to-beat advantage
3	San Beda Red Lionesses	9	8	1	21	25	10	2.500	809	686	1.179	Semifinals
4	Perpetual Lady Altas (H)	9	6	3	19	22	12	1.833	776	647	1.199	Semifinals
5	Lyceum Lady Pirates	9	4	5	13	16	17	0.941	704	737	0.955	
6	JRU Lady Bombers	9	4	5	12	17	18	0.944	738	749	0.985	
7	San Sebastian Lady Stags	9	4	5	11	13	18	0.722	621	676	0.919	
8	Letran Lady Knights	9	2	7	5	8	23	0.348	596	725	0.822	
9	Mapúa Lady Cardinals	9	1	8	5	8	24	0.333	622	732	0.850	
10	EAC Lady Generals	9	0	9	0	1	27	0.037	482	701	0.688	

Rules for classification: Point system: 3 points = win match in 3 or 4 sets; 2 points = win match in 5 sets; 1 point = lose match in 5 sets; 0 point = lose match in 3 or 4 sets
(H) Host

==== Match-up results ====
Team ╲ Game	1	2	3	4	5	6	7	8	9
Arellano	JRU school colors	CSB school colors	Mapua school colors	SSC-R school colors	Lyceum school colors	Letran school colors	EAC school colors	UPHD school colors	San Beda school colors
Benilde	Arellano school colors	Letran school colors	UPHD school colors	EAC school colors	San Beda school colors	Lyceum school colors	JRU school colors	SSC-R school colors	Mapua school colors
Letran	EAC school colors	CSB school colors	JRU school colors	SSC-R school colors	UPHD school colors	Arellano school colors	San Beda school colors	Mapua school colors	Lyceum school colors
EAC	Letran school colors	UPHD school colors	San Beda school colors	CSB school colors	SSC-R school colors	JRU school colors	Mapua school colors	Arellano school colors	Lyceum school colors
JRU	Arellano school colors	Lyceum school colors	Letran school colors	Mapua school colors	San Beda school colors	EAC school colors	SSC-R school colors	CSB school colors	UPHD school colors
Lyceum	SSC-R school colors	JRU school colors	San Beda school colors	UPHD school colors	Arellano school colors	Mapua school colors	CSB school colors	EAC school colors	Letran school colors
Mapúa	San Beda school colors	SSC-R school colors	Arellano school colors	JRU school colors	Lyceum school colors	EAC school colors	UPHD school colors	Letran school colors	CSB school colors
San Beda	UPHD school colors	Mapua school colors	Lyceum school colors	EAC school colors	JRU school colors	CSB school colors	Letran school colors	SSC-R school colors	Arellano school colors
San Sebastian	Lyceum school colors	Mapua school colors	Arellano school colors	Letran school colors	EAC school colors	JRU school colors	San Beda school colors	CSB school colors	UPHD school colors
Perpetual	San Beda school colors	EAC school colors	CSB school colors	Lyceum school colors	Letran school colors	Mapua school colors	Arellano school colors	SSC-R school colors	JRU school colors

= Win; = Loss

==== Game results ====
Team	AU	CSJL	CSB	EAC	JRU	LPU	MU	SBU	SSC-R	UPHSD
AU		3–0	3–2	3–0	3–0	3–0	3–0	2–3	3–0	3–1
CSJL			0–3	3–0	1–3	1–3	3–2	0–3	0–3	0–3
CSB				3–0	3–1	3–1	3–0	3–1	3–0	3–1
EAC					0–3	0–3	0–3	1–3	0–3	0–3
JRU						1–3	3–2	2–3	3–0	1–3
LPU							3–0	0–3	2–3	1–3
MU								0–3	1–3	0–3
SBU									3–0	3–2
SSC-R										1–3

Legend: Blue = left column team win; Red = top row team win.

=== Playoffs ===
Semifinals (Nos. 1 & 2 have twice-to-beat advantage)
1	Benilde	1	2
4	Perpetual	3	3
2	Arellano	3
3	San Beda	0

Finals (Best-of-three series)
4	Perpetual	3	2	1
2	Arellano	1	3	3

==== Semifinals ====
Arellano vs San Beda Arellano with twice-to-beat advantage.

January 22, 2019; 14:00 (UTC +8:00)	Arellano Lady Chiefs	3–0	San Beda Red Lionesses	Filoil Flying V Arena, San Juan City
January 22, 2019; 14:00 (UTC +8:00)	(25–18, 25–21, 25–23)			Filoil Flying V Arena, San Juan City

CSB vs Perpetual CSB with twice-to-beat advantage.

January 22, 2019; 16:00 (UTC +8:00)	Benilde Lady Blazers	1–3	Perpetual Lady Altas	Filoil Flying V Arena, San Juan City
January 22, 2019; 16:00 (UTC +8:00)	(23–25, 21–25, 25–20, 23–25)			Filoil Flying V Arena, San Juan City

January 29, 2019; 15:00 (UTC +8:00)	Perpetual Lady Altas	3–2	Benilde Lady Blazers	Filoil Flying V Arena, San Juan City
January 29, 2019; 15:00 (UTC +8:00)	(25–17, 27–29, 19–25, 26–24, 16–14)			Filoil Flying V Arena, San Juan City

==== Finals ====
Perpetual vs Arellano Best of three series.

February 1, 2019; 14:00 (UTC +8:00)	Perpetual Lady Altas	3–1	Arellano Lady Chiefs	Filoil Flying V Arena, San Juan City
February 1, 2019; 14:00 (UTC +8:00)	(21–25, 25–17, 25–21, 25–20)			Filoil Flying V Arena, San Juan City

February 8, 2019; 16:00 (UTC +8:00)	Arellano Lady Chiefs	3–2	Perpetual Lady Altas	Filoil Flying V Arena, San Juan City
February 8, 2019; 16:00 (UTC +8:00)	(23–25, 25–9, 25–18, 22–25, 15–12)			Filoil Flying V Arena, San Juan City

February 12, 2019; 16:00 (UTC +8:00)	Perpetual Lady Altas	1–3	Arellano Lady Chiefs	Filoil Flying V Arena, San Juan City
February 12, 2019; 16:00 (UTC +8:00)	(25–22, 15–25, 18–25, 18–25)			Filoil Flying V Arena, San Juan City

- Finals' Most Valuable Player: Regine Arocha

=== Awards ===
- Most Valuable Player: Necole Ebuen ( Arellano University)
- Rookie of the Year: Lynne Robyn Matias ( San Beda University)
- 1st Best Outside Spiker: Cindy Imbo ( University of Perpetual Help System DALTA)
- 2nd Best Outside Spiker: Cesca Racraquin ( San Beda University)
- 1st Best Middle Blocker: Rachel Anne Austero ( De La Salle–College of Saint Benilde)
- 2nd Best Middle Blocker: Bien Elaine Juanillo ( Lyceum of the Philippines University)
- Best Opposite Spiker: Necole Ebuen ( Arellano University)
- Best Setter: Lynne Robyn Matias ( San Beda University)
- Best Libero: Daryl Racraquin ( San Beda University)

== Juniors' tournament ==
=== Match-up results ===
Team ╲ Game	1	2	3	4	5	6	7	8	9
Arellano	JRU school colors	CSB school colors	Mapua school colors	SSC-R school colors	Lyceum school colors	Letran school colors	EAC school colors	UPHD school colors	San Beda school colors
Letran	EAC school colors	CSB school colors	JRU school colors	SSC-R school colors	UPHD school colors	Arellano school colors	San Beda school colors	Mapua school colors	Lyceum school colors
LSGH	Arellano school colors	Letran school colors	UPHD school colors	EAC school colors	San Beda school colors	Lyceum school colors	JRU school colors	SSC-R school colors	Mapua school colors
EAC–ICA	Letran school colors	UPHD school colors	San Beda school colors	CSB school colors	SSC-R school colors	JRU school colors	Mapua school colors	Arellano school colors	Lyceum school colors
JRU	Arellano school colors	Lyceum school colors	Letran school colors	Mapua school colors	San Beda school colors	EAC school colors	SSC-R school colors	CSB school colors	UPHD school colors
Lyceum	SSC-R school colors	JRU school colors	San Beda school colors	UPHD school colors	Arellano school colors	Mapua school colors	CSB school colors	EAC school colors	Letran school colors
MHSS	San Beda school colors	SSC-R school colors	Arellano school colors	JRU school colors	Lyceum school colors	EAC school colors	UPHD school colors	Letran school colors	CSB school colors
San Beda	UPHD school colors	Mapua school colors	Lyceum school colors	EAC school colors	JRU school colors	CSB school colors	Letran school colors	SSC-R school colors	Arellano school colors
San Sebastian	Lyceum school colors	Mapua school colors	Arellano school colors	Letran school colors	EAC school colors	JRU school colors	San Beda school colors	CSB school colors	UPHD school colors
Perpetual	San Beda school colors	EAC school colors	CSB school colors	Lyceum school colors	Letran school colors	Mapua school colors	Arellano school colors	SSC-R school colors	JRU school colors

= Win; = Loss

=== Game results ===
Team	AU	CSJL	LSGH	EAC-ICA	JRU	LPU	MU	SBU-R	SSC-R	UPHSD
AU		–	–	–	–	–	–	–	–	–
CSJL			–	–	–	–	–	–	–	–
LSGH				–	–	–	–	–	–	–
EAC-ICA					–	–	–	–	–	–
JRU						–	–	–	–	–
LPU							–	–	–	–
MU								–	–	–
SBU-R									–	–
SSC-R										–

Legend: Blue = left column team win; Red = top row team win.
- Finals' Most Valuable Player: Hero Austria
- Coach of the Year:

=== Awards ===
- Season Most Valuable Player: Christian Dela Cruz ( Colegio de San Juan de Letran)
- Rookie of the Year: Eljie Jaballa ( San Beda University Rizal)
- 1st Best Outside Spiker: Christian Dela Cruz ( Colegio de San Juan de Letran)
- 2nd Best Outside Spiker: Noel Michael Kampton ( University of Perpetual Help System DALTA)
- 1st Best Middle Blocker: Yoj Pabiton ( Lyceum of the Philippines University)
- 2nd Best Middle Blocker:Kirth Rosos ( University of Perpetual Help System DALTA)
- Best Opposite Spiker:John Paulo Lorenzo ( Colegio de San Juan de Letran)
- Best Setter: Michael Escallar ( Lyceum of the Philippines University)
- Best Libero: Lance de Castro ( San Beda University Rizal)

== See also ==
- UAAP Season 81 volleyball tournaments

Preceded by NCAA Season 93	NCAA Philippines seasons 2018–19	Succeeded by NCAA Season 95
