= NCAA Season 94 =

- Host school: University of Perpetual Help System DALTA
- Tagline: "UnParalleled Heights through Sports Development"

General
- Seniors: San Beda University
- Juniors: University of Perpetual Help System DALTA

Seniors' champions
Sport		Men	Women
Basketball		San Beda	N/A
Volleyball		Perpetual	Arellano
Chess		Benilde	
Taekwondo		Benilde	Benilde
Table Tennis		Benilde	San Beda
Lawn Tennis		San Beda	San Beda
Soft Tennis		San Beda	San Beda
Swimming		San Beda	San Beda
Beach Volleyball		EAC	San Beda
Track and Field		JRU	
Football		San Beda	
Badminton		San Beda	Benilde
- Cheerdance: Arellano (Ex - Coed)

Juniors' champions
Sport		Boys	Girls
Basketball		Mapúa	N/A
Volleyball		Perpetual	
Chess		Perpetual	
Taekwondo		Arellano	
Table Tennis		Letran	
Lawn Tennis		Lyceum	
Swimming		LSGH	
Beach Volleyball		Perpetual	
Track and Field		Perpetual	
Football		Arellano	
Badminton		San Sebastian	
- (NT) = No tournament; (DS) = Demonstration Sport; (Ex) = Exhibition;

NCAA Season 94 was the 2018–19 collegiate athletic year of the National Collegiate Athletic Association (NCAA) of the Philippines. It was hosted by University of Perpetual Help System DALTA.

== Calendar ==
Basketball started the season, with the opening game between San Beda and Perpetual being held at the Mall of Asia Arena on July 7.

== Basketball ==
The basketball tournaments for NCAA Season 94 began on July 7, 2018, at the Mall of Asia Arena to a crowd of 19,204. The referee pool from the Maharlika Pilipinas Basketball League was used for officiating purposes.

=== Seniors' tournament ===
==== Elimination round ====
Pos	Team	W	L	PCT	GB	Qualification
1	San Beda Red Lions	17	1	.944	—	Twice-to-beat in the semifinals
2	Lyceum Pirates	15	3	.833	2	Twice-to-beat in the semifinals
3	Letran Knights	13	5	.722	4	Twice-to-win in the semifinals
4	Perpetual Altas (H)	11	7	.611	6	Twice-to-win in the semifinals
5	Benilde Blazers	10	8	.556	7	
6	San Sebastian Stags (Note: San Sebastian forfeited two wins due to an ineligible player, RK Ilagan, participating in those games. Ilagan was found to have found playing in a ligang labas game after the rosters were approved.)	6	12	.333 (Note: Head-to-head point differential: San Sebastian +46, Mapua −46)	11	
7	Mapúa Cardinals	6	12	.333	11	
8	Arellano Chiefs	5	13	.278	12	
9	EAC Generals	4	14	.222	13	
10	JRU Heavy Bombers	3	15	.167	14	

Source: ABS-CBN Sports
Rules for classification: 1) winning percentage; 2) if tied in top 4, one-game playoff; 3) head-to-head point differential; 4) overall point differential
(H) Hosts

==== Playoffs ====
Semifinals (Top 2 twice-to-beat)
1	San Beda	83
4	Perpetual	72
2	Lyceum	109
3	Letran	85

Finals (Best-of-three playoff)
1	San Beda	73	71
2	Lyceum	60	56

=== Juniors' tournament ===
==== Elimination round ====
Pos	Team	W	L	PCT	GB	Qualification
1	La Salle Green Hills Greenies	16	2	.889	—	Twice-to-beat in the semifinals
2	Mapúa Red Robins	14	4	.778	2	Twice-to-beat in the semifinals
3	San Beda Red Cubs	12	6	.667	4	Twice-to-win in the semifinals
4	JRU Light Bombers	11	7	.611	5	Twice-to-win in the semifinals
5	Lyceum Junior Pirates	9	9	.500 (Note: Head-to-head point differential: Lyceum 0, Perpetual 0; overall record point differential: Lyceum −8, Perpetual −14)	7	
6	Perpetual Junior Altas (H)	9	9	.500	7	
7	Arellano Braves	7	11	.389	9	
8	San Sebastian Staglets	5	13	.278	11	
9	Letran Squires	4	14	.222	12	
10	EAC–ICA Brigadiers	3	15	.167	13	

Rules for classification: 1) winning percentage; 2) if tied for #2 or #4, one-game playoff; 3) head-to-head point differential; 4) overall point differential
(H) Hosts

==== Playoffs ====
Semifinals (Top 2 twice-to-beat)
1	LSGH	78	97
4	JRU	81	71
2	Malayan	71	75
3	San Beda–Rizal	84	67

Finals (Best-of-three playoff)
1	LSGH	74	76	74
2	Malayan	69	85	77

== Volleyball ==
The volleyball tournament of the NCAA Season 94 started on November 23, 2018, at the Filoil Flying V Arena in San Juan, Philippines.

=== Men's tournament ===
==== Elimination round ====
Pos	Team	Pld	W	L	Pts	SW	SL	SR	SPW	SPL	SPR	Qualification
1	Perpetual Altas (H)	9	9	0	27	27	2	13.500	725	558	1.299	Finals
2	Benilde Blazers	9	8	1	24	25	5	5.000	729	597	1.221	Semifinals
3	Arellano Chiefs	9	7	2	20	22	10	2.200	736	640	1.150	First round playoff
4	EAC Generals	9	6	3	17	21	13	1.615	751	724	1.037	First round playoff
5	San Sebastian Stags	9	4	5	12	14	19	0.737	722	749	0.964	
6	Letran Knights	9	3	6	9	12	21	0.571	660	745	0.886	
7	Lyceum Pirates	9	3	6	8	12	20	0.600	693	732	0.947	
8	JRU Heavy Bombers	9	2	7	8	11	23	0.478	727	803	0.905	
9	San Beda Red Lions	9	2	7	6	10	23	0.435	729	782	0.932	
10	Mapúa Cardinals	9	2	7	5	9	25	0.360	660	779	0.847	

Rules for classification: Point system: 3 points = win match in 3 or 4 sets; 2 points = win match in 5 sets; 1 point = lose match in 5 sets; 0 point = lose match in 3 or 4 sets
(H) Host

==== Playoffs ====
First round (One-game playoff)
3	Arellano	2
4	EAC	3

Semifinals (No. 2 seed has twice-to-beat advantage)
2	Benilde	3
4	EAC	0

Finals (Best-of-three series)
1	Perpetual	3	3
2	Benilde	2	1

=== Women's tournament ===
==== Elimination round ====
Pos	Team	Pld	W	L	Pts	SW	SL	SR	SPW	SPL	SPR	Qualification
1	Benilde Lady Blazers	9	8	1	25	26	7	3.714	782	641	1.220	Semifinals with a twice-to-beat advantage
2	Arellano Lady Chiefs	9	8	1	24	26	6	4.333	748	565	1.324	Semifinals with a twice-to-beat advantage
3	San Beda Red Lionesses	9	8	1	21	25	10	2.500	809	686	1.179	Semifinals
4	Perpetual Lady Altas (H)	9	6	3	19	22	12	1.833	776	647	1.199	Semifinals
5	Lyceum Lady Pirates	9	4	5	13	16	17	0.941	704	737	0.955	
6	JRU Lady Bombers	9	4	5	12	17	18	0.944	738	749	0.985	
7	San Sebastian Lady Stags	9	4	5	11	13	18	0.722	621	676	0.919	
8	Letran Lady Knights	9	2	7	5	8	23	0.348	596	725	0.822	
9	Mapúa Lady Cardinals	9	1	8	5	8	24	0.333	622	732	0.850	
10	EAC Lady Generals	9	0	9	0	1	27	0.037	482	701	0.688	

Rules for classification: Point system: 3 points = win match in 3 or 4 sets; 2 points = win match in 5 sets; 1 point = lose match in 5 sets; 0 point = lose match in 3 or 4 sets
(H) Host

==== Playoffs ====
Semifinals (Nos. 1 & 2 have twice-to-beat advantage)
1	Benilde	1	2
4	Perpetual	3	3
2	Arellano	3
3	San Beda	0

Finals (Best-of-three series)
4	Perpetual	3	2	1
2	Arellano	1	3	3

== See also ==
- UAAP Season 81

== Broadcast coverage ==
Play by Play

- Migz Bustos
- Andrei Felix
- Mico Halili (Basketball only)
- Martin Javier
- Anton Roxas

Analyst (Basketball)

- Martin Antonio
- Danica Jose
- Mikee Reyes
- Renren Ritualo
- LA Tenorio

Courtside Reporter

- Ganiel Krishnan
- Angelique Manto
- Roxanne Montealegre
- Ceej Tantengco
- Aya De Quiroz
- Chase Orozco
